= List of FNN and FNS affiliates =

Japanese commercial television networks

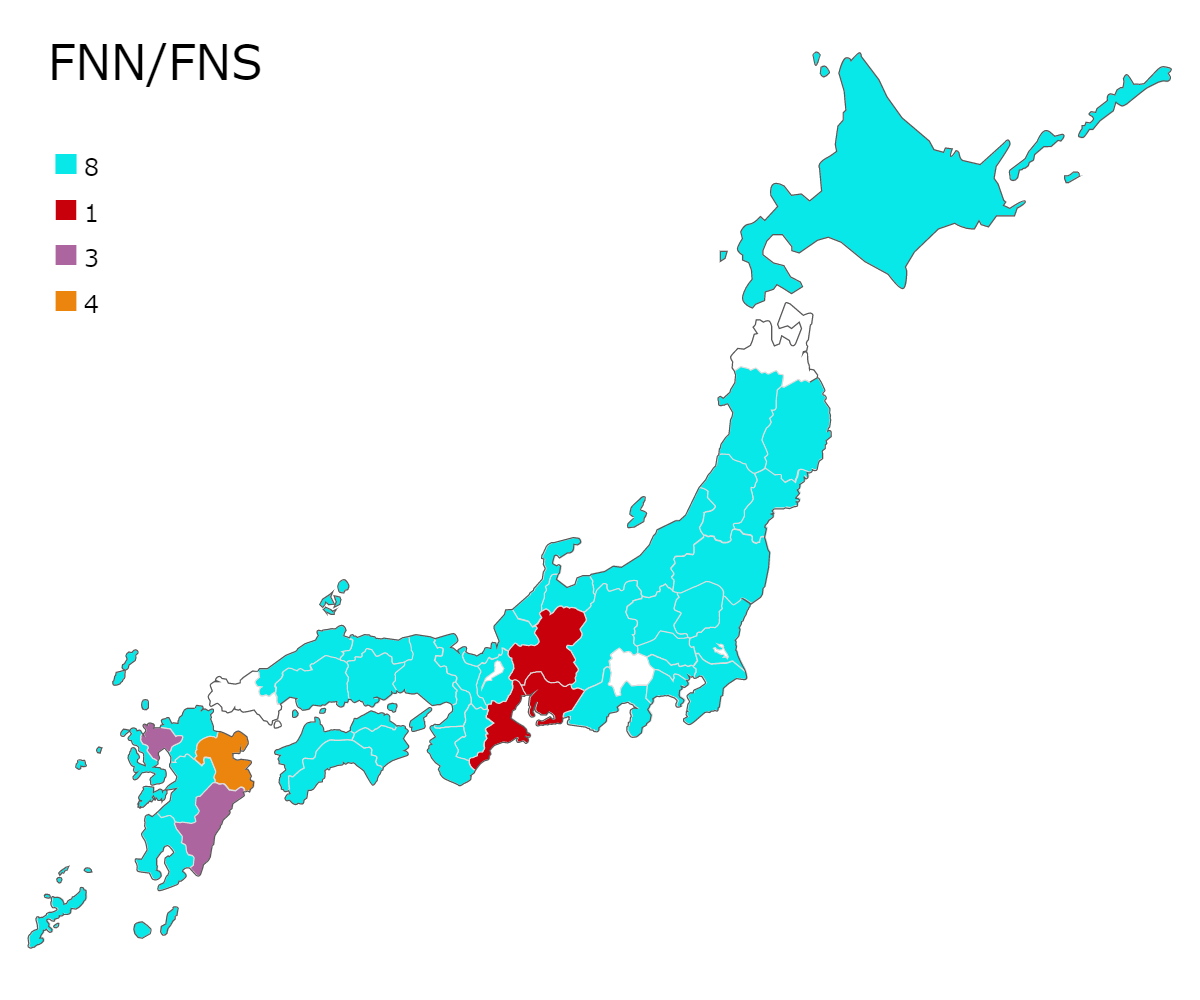
LCN assignments of FNN and FNS affiliates

The Fuji News Network (FNN) and Fuji Network System (FNS) are Japanese commercial television networks organised by Fuji Television (Fuji TV) in Tokyo, which is owned by Fuji Media Holdings and a group company of the Fujisankei Communications Group. FNN provides national news and current affairs programming to its regional affiliates, while FNS feeds entertainment and other non-news programmes. FNN and FNS are made up of 28 affiliates, including two stations that are double- or triple-affiliated with rival networks.

FNN was founded on 3 October 1966, while FNS was founded on 1 October 1969.

Stations are listed mostly in Japanese order of prefectures which is mirrored in ISO 3166-2:JP, with exceptions for the Kantō region, Aichi-Gifu-Mie, Kansai region (except Mie), Tottori-Shimane and Okayama-Kagawa, which form single wide broadcasting markets respectively.

== Affiliate stations ==
Broadcasting area(s)		Station			LCN	Start date of broadcast	Date of affiliation		Note(s)
Prefecture	Region	On air branding	Abbr.	Call sign	LCN	Start date of broadcast	FNN	FNS	Note(s)
Hokkaidō		Hokkaido Cultural Broadcasting	uhb	JOBM-DTV	8	1 April 1972	1 April 1972	1 April 1972	Core station
Iwate	Tōhoku	Iwate Menkoi TV	mit	JOYH-DTV	8	1 April 1991	1 April 1991	1 April 1991	
Miyagi	Tōhoku	Sendai Broadcasting	OX	JOOX-DTV	8	1 October 1962	3 October 1966	1 October 1969	Core station
Akita	Tōhoku	Akita TV	AKT	JOBI-DTV	8	1 October 1969	1 October 1969	1 October 1969	
Yamagata	Tōhoku	Sakuranbo TV	SAY	JOCY-DTV	8	1 April 1997	1 April 1997	1 April 1997	
Fukushima	Tōhoku	Fukushima TV	FTV	JOPX-DTV	8	1 April 1963	1 April 1983	1 October 1971	
Kantō region		Fuji TV	CX	JOCX-DTV	8	1 March 1959	3 October 1966	1 October 1969	Eastern flagship station; core station
Niigata	Chūbu	NST Niigata Sogo TV	NST	JONH-DTV	8	16 December 1968	16 December 1968	1 October 1969	
Toyama	Chūbu	Toyama TV	BBT (Note: Until December 31, 1993, abbreviated as T34.)	JOTH-DTV	8	1 April 1969	1 April 1969	1 October 1969	
Ishikawa	Chūbu	Ishikawa TV	ITC	JOIH-DTV	8	1 April 1969	1 April 1969	1 October 1969	
Fukui	Chūbu	Fukui TV	FTB	JOFI-DTV	8	1 October 1969	1 October 1969	1 October 1969	
Nagano	Chūbu	Nagano Broadcasting	NBS	JOLH-DTV	8	1 April 1969	1 April 1969	1 October 1969	
Shizuoka	Chūbu	TV Shizuoka	SUT	JOQH-DTV	8	1 November 1968	1 November 1968	1 October 1969	Core station
Aichi and Gifu	Chūbu	Tokai TV	THK	JOFX-DTV	1	25 December 1958	3 October 1966	1 October 1969	Core station
Mie	Kansai	Tokai TV	THK	JOFX-DTV	1	25 December 1958	3 October 1966	1 October 1969	Core station
Kansai region (except Mie)		Kansai TV	KTV	JODX-DTV	8	22 November 1958	3 October 1966	1 October 1969	Western flagship station; core station
Tottori and Shimane	Chūgoku	San-in Chūō TV	TSK	JOMI-DTV	8	1 April 1970	1 April 1970	1 April 1970	
Hiroshima	Chūgoku	TV Shinhiroshima	TSS	JORM-DTV	8	1 October 1975	1 October 1975	1 October 1975	Core station
Okayama	Chūgoku	Okayama Broadcasting	OHK	JOOH-DTV	8	1 April 1969	1 April 1969	1 October 1969	
Kagawa	Shikoku	Okayama Broadcasting	OHK	JOOH-DTV	8	1 April 1969	1 April 1969	1 October 1969	
Ehime	Shikoku	TV Ehime	EBC	JOEI-DTV	8	10 December 1969	10 December 1969	10 December 1969	
Kōchi	Shikoku	Kochi Sun Sun TV	KSS	JOQX-DTV	8	1 April 1997	1 April 1997	1 April 1997	
Fukuoka	Kyūshū	TV Nishinippon	TNC	JOJY-DTV	8	28 August 1958	3 October 1966	1 October 1969	Core station
Saga	Kyūshū	Saga TV	sts	JOSH-DTV	3	1 April 1969	1 April 1969	1 October 1969	
Nagasaki	Kyūshū	TV Nagasaki	KTN	JOWH-DTV	8	1 April 1969	1 April 1969	1 October 1969	
Kumamoto	Kyūshū	TV Kumamoto	TKU	JOZH-DTV	8	1 April 1969	1 April 1969	1 October 1969	
Ōita	Kyūshū	TV Oita	TOS	JOOI-DTV	4	1 April 1970	1 April 1970	1 April 1970	Also affiliated with NNN/NNS
Miyazaki	Kyūshū	TV Miyazaki	UMK	JODI-DTV	3	1 April 1970	26 January 1973	1 April 1972	Primary affiliate; also affiliated with NNN and ANN
Kagoshima	Kyūshū	Kagoshima TV	KTS	JOKH-DTV	8	1 April 1969	1 April 1969	1 October 1969	
Okinawa	Kyūshū	Okinawa TV	OTV	JOOF-DTV	8	1 November 1959	15 May 1972	15 May 1972	

== Areas without an FNN/FNS station ==
Prefecture	Region	Station(s) from neighbouring prefecture	News gathering
Aomori	Tōhoku	mit (Iwate), AKT (Akita) and uhb (Hokkaidō)	Fuji TV Aomori Bureau and mit Hachinohe Bureau
Yamanashi	Chūbu	Fuji TV (Kantō region)	Fuji TV Kōfu Bureau
Yamaguchi	Chūgoku	TNC (Fukuoka) and TSS (Hiroshima)	TNC (most of Yamaguchi), TSS (Iwakuni and Waki) and TSK (Hagi and nearby area, in certain cases)
Tokushima	Shikoku	KTV (Kansai region) and OHK (Okayama and Kagawa)	KTV Tokushima Bureau

== Former affiliate stations ==
Single asterisk (*) indicates former primary affiliate

Broadcasting area(s)		Station			Ch.	Years of affiliation	Current affiliation	Current FNN/FNS affiliate	Note(s)
Prefecture	Region	On air branding	Abbr.	Call sign	Ch.	Years of affiliation	Current affiliation	Current FNN/FNS affiliate	Note(s)
Hokkaidō		Sapporo TV	STV	JOKX-TV	5	1966–1972 (secondary)	NNN/NNS	uhb	(Note: Secondary affiliate from 3 October 1966 to 31 March 1972. Fuji TV/FNN programs moved to UHB on 1 April 1972. Now affiliated with NNN/NNS.)
Yamagata	Tōhoku	Yamagata TV*	YTS	JOYI-TV	38	1970–1993	ANN	SAY	(Note: Was affiliated to FNN from 1 April 1970 (when it launched) to 31 March 1993. Now affiliated to ANN. Fuji TV programming moved to SAY, which started broadcasting on 1 April 1997.)
Fukushima	Tōhoku	Fukushima Central TV*	FCT	JOVI-TV	33	1970–1971	NNN/NNS	FTV	(Note: FNN's shortest-lived affiliate, from its founding on 1 April 1970, until 30 September 1971. FCT had close ties with the Yomiuri Shimbun, owner of various TV stations affiliated to NNN/NNS, including Yomiuri Television. FNN programming is currently on Fukushima TV.)
Tottori and Shimane	Chūgoku	Nihonkai TV	NKT	JOJX-TV	1	1966–1972 (secondary)	NNN/NNS	TSK	(Note: Secondary affiliate from 3 October 1966 to 21 September 1972. FNN programs moved to TSK as it started to expand its broadcasting area to Tottori prefecture after being exclusive to Shimane prefecture.)
Hiroshima	Chūgoku	Hiroshima TV	HTV	JONX-TV	12	1962–1975	NNN/NNS	TSS	(Note: When it started broadcasting on 1 September 1962, it was a dual affiliate of Nippon TV and Fuji TV. Fuji TV programming moved to TSS on 1 October 1975.)

== Affiliates that initially wanted to join but later withdrew ==
Broadcasting area(s)		Station			Ch.	Current affiliation	Current FNN/FNS affiliate	Note(s)
Prefecture	Region	On air branding	Abbr.	Call sign	Ch.	Current affiliation	Current FNN/FNS affiliate	Note(s)
Hokkaidō		HTB	HTB	JOHH-TV	35	ANN	uhb	Fuji TV's affiliation (FNN/FNS) was considered to be a strong candidate, but at that time NNN/FNS dual affiliate Sapporo Television Broadcasting (STV) rebelled, and NET TV (currently TV Asahi) was a strong backup, and because the allocation of the 4th station in Hokkaido was also confirmed, the TV Asahi (ANN) network was finally selected.
Aomori	Tōhoku	ATV	ATV	JOAI-TV	38	JNN	N/A	During the preparation period for the opening of the station, ATV signed an agreement with Fuji Television Network, Inc., but immediately before the opening of the station, it changed to a TV Asahi (ANN)/TBS (JNN) affiliate.
Yamanashi	Chūbu	UTY	UTY	JOGI-TV	38	JNN	N/A	During the preparation period for the opening of the station, UTY signed an agreement with Fuji TV, but immediately before the opening of the station, it changed to a TBS (JNN) affiliate.
Yamaguchi	Chūgoku	TYS	TYS	JOLI-TV	38	JNN	N/A	Because it conflicts with the JNN agreement (it was a member of FNS).
Kochi	Shikoku	TV Kochi	KUTV	JORI-TV	8	JNN	KSS	During the preparation period for the opening of the station, KUTV signed an agreement with Fuji TV, but immediately before the opening of the station, it changed to a TBS (JNN) affiliate.
