= The Sankei Shimbun =

Japanese daily newspaper

- Frontpage of the Sankei Shimbun on April 25, 2026
- Type: Daily newspaper
- Format: Blanket (54.6 cm x 40.65 cm)
- Owner(s): Sankei Shimbun Co., Ltd. (mostly owned by Fuji Media Holdings)
- Publisher: Takamitsu Kumasaka
- Founded: March 1, 1882 (as Jiji News); June 20, 1933 (as Nihon Kogyo Shimbun)
- Political alignment: Conservatism; Nationalism; Right-wing to far-right
- Language: Japanese
- Headquarters: Tokyo; Osaka
- Circulation: Morning edition: 844,000; Evening edition: (Note: The paper's evening edition is published only for the Kansai region.) 212,000; (ABC Japan, In August 2024)
- Website: www.sankei.com

The Sankei Shimbun (Japanese: 産経新聞, Hepburn: Sankei Shinbun), name short for Sangyō Keizai Shinbun (産業経済新聞, lit. 'Industrial and Economic News'), is a daily national newspaper in Japan published by the Sankei Shimbun Co., Ltd, ranking amongst the top five most circulated newspapers in Japan. Together with its English-language paper Japan Forward, the Sankei Shimbun has been described as having a conservative, nationalist, far-right political stance. It has repeatedly published materials downplaying, whitewashing, or outright denying Japanese war crimes.

== Corporate profile ==
The Sankei Shimbun is part of the Fujisankei Communications Group and is 40% owned by Fuji Media Holdings. The company is also the owner of Osaka Broadcasting Corporation (OBC, Radio Osaka).

== History ==
The Sankei Shimbun was created by the merger of two older newspapers: Jiji News and Nihon Kogyō Shimbun. Jiji News was founded in 1882 by author, translator, and journalist Fukuzawa Yukichi, who also founded Keio University. Nihon Kogyō Shimbun, founded in 1933 by Hisakichi Maeda, specialized in business and was published by the Minami-Osaka Shimbun (the South Osaka Evening newspaper). In 1941, the Osaka Shimbun (renamed from Minami-Osaka Shimbun) merged with Osaka Jiji Shimpō (Jiji-Shimpō Osaka edition). The following year, Nihon Kogyō Shimbun merged with other business newspapers in Western Japan, and changed its name to the Sangyō Keizai Shimbun (or the Sankei). In 1955, the Sankei merged with Jiji Shimpō. In 1959, the Sankei and Jiji Shimpō were placed under the Sankei Shimbun masthead.

In 1958, the Sankei was acquired by Shigeo Mizuno and Nobutaka Shikanai. After financial difficulties, it changed direction from being liberal to being conservative (Tenkō). Both Mizuno and Shikanai would go on to found Fuji Television a year later.

The Sankei Shimbun started two online newspapers in 1996: Sankei Web, in website style, and E-NEWS, in personal digital assistant style. In 2001, the Sankei Shimbun started a new electronic newspaper delivery edition, NEWSVUE. In 2002, the Sankei Shimbun merged with Osaka Shimbun. Both editions were placed under the Sankei Shimbun masthead. In 2005, the Sankei Shimbun added video to its digital edition, suitable for smartphone, and renamed it as Sankei NetView. In 2007, the Sankei Shimbun started a new online newspaper, MSN Sankei News, in collaboration with Microsoft. In 2014 the Sankei Shimbun rebranded its online news as Sankei News.

In August 2014, South Korea filed suit against the Sankei for insults against president Park Geun-hye, published in one of the newspaper's articles, and demanded Tatsuya Kato, head of the Seoul Bureau, present himself for questioning. The article in question covered several rumors about Park during the sinking of MV Sewol, referring to Korean news reports in the conservative newspaper The Chosun Ilbo; however, only the Sankei was charged with defamation, considered an anti-Korean newspaper in Korea. The Japanese media assumed the suit was a warning to the Sankei. Kato, who was eventually acquitted of defamation charges in December 2015, was under prosecution without detention for a year and two months. The South Korean court said press freedoms were taken into consideration in arriving at Kato's acquittal.

In December 2014, the newspaper apologized after running an advert for antisemitic books by conspiracy theorist Richard Koshimizu.

On February 11, 2015, regular columnist Ayako Sono wrote an opinion piece opining that though she considered it necessary for Japan to accept more immigrants to bolster its decreasing workforce, it would also be necessary for Japan to take steps to ensure the separation of immigrants in regards to living conditions, citing South African apartheid as an example of how to achieve this goal.

In 2017, Sankei Shimbun launched the English language online website Japan Forward.

== Ownership ==
- Sankei Shimbun (産経新聞, Sankei Shimbun), a national newspaper.
- FujiSankei Business i (フジサンケイビジネスアイ, FujiSankei Business i), an industry, business and economy newspaper that renamed Nihon Kogyo Shimbun (Japan Industry Newspaper) in March 2004, which ended publication in July 2021.
- Sankei Sports (サンケイスポーツ, Sankei Sports), a Japanese daily sports newspaper since 1955.
- Yukan Fuji (夕刊フジ, Fuji Evening Edition), a Japanese daily evening tabloid newspaper since 1969. suspended publication on 2025.
- Keiba Eight (競馬エイト, Horse Racing Eight), a horse racing newspaper since 1971.
- Osaka Shimbun (大阪新聞), a Kansai regional evening newspaper that suspended publication in 2002.
- Sankei Express (サンケイエクスプレス（産経エクスプレス）), a targeted at young people newspaper founded in 2006.

== Political stances ==
The Sankei Shimbun is a nationalist and conservative newspaper. Some book and media outlets have called the Sankei Shimbun a far-right newspaper; The Sankei Shimbun has previously published revisionist perspectives on Imperial Japan's wartime history, particularly regarding the Nanjing Massacre and the "comfort women" system. These include casting doubt, minimizing, and outright denying the atrocities committed by the Imperial Japanese Army in World War II.

In July 2015, Sankei Shimbun published the history book History Wars: Japan – False Indictment of the Century, which questioned the veracity of claims of Japanese war crimes during World War II.

In September 2015, several hundred academics and journalists were sent copies of History Wars and Getting Over it! Why Korea Needs to Stop Bashing Japan. The book mailings were part of a project by right-wing groups such as the Nippon Kaigi to improve international perceptions of Japan. A covering letter from politician Inoguchi Kuniko read in part: "In East Asia, the regional history of the 20th century has been incorrectly distorted [sic] by some individuals due to their current domestic political ambitions, I believe it is important for you, as a highly esteemed member of the academic and policy circles [sic], to look into the books which I am enclosing with this letter."

In April 2025, Philip Brasor and Masako Tsubuku of the Foreign Correspondents' Club of Japan alleged that Sankei Shimbun was a significant presence in spreading anti-Kurdish sentiment in Japan. They alleged that Sankei had published misleading stories that leaned negative about Kurds on a number of occasions.

== Sankei Award, Sankei Prize ==
- Praemium Imperiale (高松宮殿下記念世界文化賞, Takamatsu no miya denka kinen sekai bunka-shō; lit. 'World Culture Prize in Memory of His Imperial Highness Prince Takamatsu') – An international art prize founded in 1989 awarded by the Imperial family of Japan on behalf of the Japan Art Association in the fields of painting, sculpture, architecture, music, theatre and film.
- Tokyo Police Officers Prize (都民の警察官, Tomin no Keisatsukan) – An award founded in 1952.
- Peoples' Self-Defense Officials Prize (国民の自衛官, Kokumin no Jieikan) – An award recognizing self-defense officials founded in 2002.
- Sankei Children's Book Award (産経児童出版文化賞, Sankei jidou shuppan bunka Shō) – The oldest children's literature award in Japan.
- Naniwa Art Festival (なにわ藝術祭, Naniwa Geijutsu Sai) (Note: 'Naniwa' refers to the place that became the modern Japanese city of Osaka.) – Major traditional culture award for the arts of rakugo (comedic Japanese verbal entertainment), buyō (Japanese dance), modern dance, classical music and jazz, awarded since 1964.
- Sankei International Calligraphic Art Exhibition (産経国際書展, Sankei Kokusai Sho-Ten) – A major kanji (Japanese calligraphy) award founded in 1984.

== Philanthropy ==
- Akemi Chan Fund (明美ちゃん基金, Akemi Chan Kikin) – a medical fund set up in Japan for impoverished children with heart defects.
- Sankei Social Welfare Association (産経新聞厚生文化事業団, Sankei Kousei bunka jigyōdan) – a nonprofit organization for societal welfare.

== Offices ==
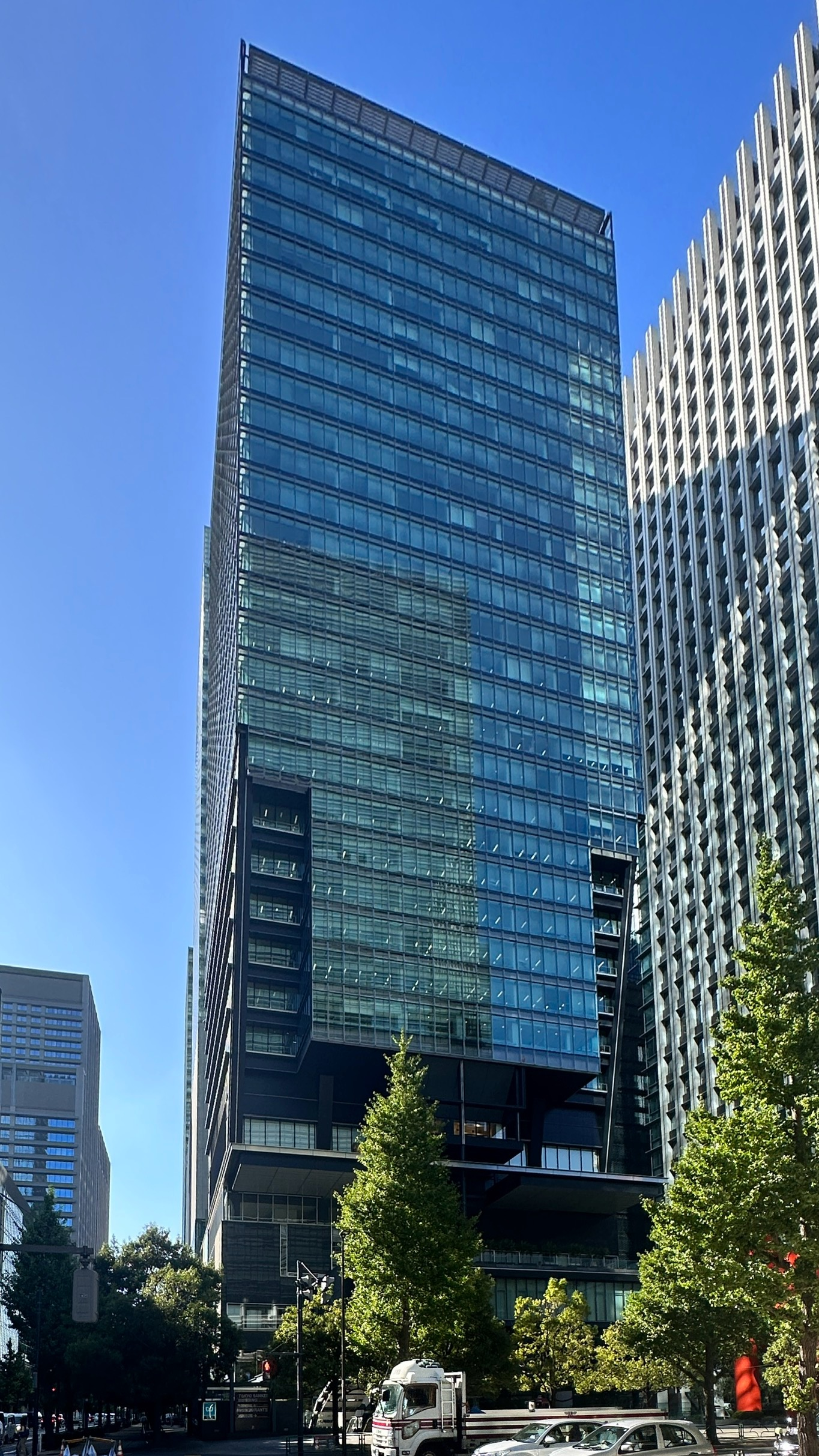
Sankei Shimbun Co., Ltd's headquarters in Ōtemachi, Chiyoda, Tokyo

- Tokyo Head Office (registered headquarters): Tokyo Sankei Building, 1-7-2, Otemachi, Chiyoda, Tokyo
- Osaka Head Office: Namba Sankei Building, 2-1-57, Minatomachi, Naniwa-ku, Osaka
  - Umeda Office: Breeze Tower, 2-4-9, Umeda, Kita-ku, Osaka
- Western Office (Fukuoka): Sunlight Building, 5-23-8, Watanabe-dori, Chuo-ku, Fukuoka

== Sankei Group affiliate companies ==
- Fujisankei Communications Group
- Fuji Television – Fuji Television Network, Inc. (株式会社フジテレビジョン, Kabushiki Gaisha Fuji Terebijon) is a major Japanese television station, also known as Fuji TV (フジテレビ, Fuji Terebi) or CX. It is the flagship station of the Fuji News Network (FNN) and the Fuji Network System.
- Kansai Telecasting Corporation
- Osaka Broadcasting Corporation – Osaka Broadcasting Corporation (大阪放送株式会社, Osaka Hoso Kabushiki-gaisha; OBC) is an AM radio station of National Radio Network (NRN) in Osaka, Japan, also known as Radio Osaka (ラジオ大阪, Rajio Osaka).
- FM 802 – FM802 (エフエムはちまるに, Efu Emu Hachi Maru Ni) is an FM radio station in Kansai, Japan.
- FM COCOLO – FM Cocolo (エフエムココロ, Efu Emu Kokoro) is a multilingual FM radio station owned and operated by FM 802 Co., Ltd
- Iwate Menkoi Television – Iwate area
- Sendai Television – Miyagi area
- Fukushima Television Broadcasting – Fukushima area
- Niigata Sogo Television – Niigata area
- Nagano Broadcasting Systems – Nagano area television station
- TV Shizuoka – Shizuoka area television station
- Okayama Broadcasting – Okayama area television station
- Ehime Broadcasting – Ehime area television station
- Shinhiroshima Telecasting – Hiroshima area television station
- Kochi Sun Sun Broadcasting – Kochi area television station
- Tokyo Tower – Hisakichi Maeda (前田 久吉) was the tower's founder and owner.
- FM Osaka – The owner is Hisakichi Maeda's family.
- Japan Airlines – Descendants of Sankei Shimbun Aviation Department Sankei Shimbun koukubu (産経新聞航空部)

== Notable corporate alumni ==
- Yoshirō Mori, the president of Tokyo Organising Committee of the Olympic and Paralympic Games, the 85th and 86th Prime Minister of Japan
- Fukushiro Nukaga, former Minister of Finance
- Eriko Yamatani, politician, former chairman of the National Public Safety Commission, former Minister for the Abduction Issue
- Tsuneo Kitamura, politician serving in the House of Councillors
- Kenta Matsunami, politician serving in the House of Representatives
- Hiroshi Nakatsuka, Japanese politician, former mayor of Hirakara
- Shoko Yamaguchi, Legion of Honour in 2013
- Ryōtarō Shiba, author
- Sakunosuke Oda, author
- Ikko Tanaka, graphic designer worked at 1964 Summer Olympics, Expo '70, Expo '85, and Expo '90
- Masami Abe, first reported the abduction of Japanese nationals by the North Korean regime in 1979, for which he was awarded the Japan Newspaper Publishers and Editors Association Award
- Tsutomu Saitō, chief operating officer at Sankei, who scooped the dissolution of the Soviet Union in 1990
- Katsuhiro Kuroda, columnist at Sankei, in Seoul Branch (South Korea)
- Yoshihisa Komori, columnist at Sankei, in Washington, D.C. Branch (United States)
- Tatsuya Kato, columnist at Sankei, former chief of Seoul branch
- Ayari Aoyama, writer at Sankei, who was a butterfly swimmer at the 1996 Summer Olympics
- Monta Mino, radio and television announcer
- Masato Kimura, freelance journalist, former chief of London Branch (United Kingdom)

== See also ==
- Mass media in Japan
