= Nippon Sangoku =

Japanese manga series

- Nippon Sangoku: The Three Nations of the Crimson Sun
- First tankōbon volume cover

日本三國 (Nihōn Sangoku)
- Genre: Post-apocalyptic
- Manga
- Written by: Ikka Matsuki
- Published by: Shogakukan
- Imprint: Ura Sunday Comics
- Magazine: MangaONE; Ura Sunday
- Original run: November 24, 2021 – present
- Volumes: 7
- Anime television series
- Directed by: Kazuaki Terasawa
- Written by: Teruko Utsumi
- Music by: Kevin Penkin
- Studio: Studio Kafka
- Licensed by: Amazon Prime Video
- Original network: Tokyo MX, BS NTV, TV Aichi, ytv, Sendai TV, ITC, BBT, EBC, tys, SBS, ABS, BSN, Fukui TV, TKU, TOS, HBC, RSK, NBS, SAY, KFB, KTS, mit, NCC, GYT, AT-X, Animax
- Original run: April 7, 2026 (Note: Episodes were released on Amazon Prime Video two days prior to their televised airings.) – June 23, 2026
- Episodes: 12
- icon

Nippon Sangoku: The Three Nations of the Crimson Sun (Japanese: 日本三國, Hepburn: Nihōn Sangoku) is a Japanese manga series written and illustrated by Ikka Matsuki. It began serialization on Shogakukan's Ura Sunday website and MangaONE app in November 2021. An anime television series adaptation produced by Studio Kafka aired from April to June 2026. A sequel has been announced.

== Plot ==
At the end of the Reiwa era, Japan was hit by the effects of nuclear war around the world, resulting in an influx of refugees followed by a deadly virus and a devastating earthquake. During this time, the country was mismanaged, with those in power levying heavy taxes, causing famine. Eventually, the people began a revolt that overthrew the national government, but the population was reduced to a tenth of its pre-war size, with the technology reduced to that of the Meiji era, and the country divided into three kingdoms: Yamato, Buo, and Seii. One hundred years later, a man named Aoteru Misumi leads a movement to reunify the country.

== Characters ==
=== Main characters ===
Aoteru Misumi (三角 青輝, Misumi Aoteru)
Voiced by: Kenshō Ono (Japanese); Alejandro Ruiz (English)
Aoteru is a cautious, attentive and by-the-book Yamato citizen from the country, who aims to change his country for the better.
Yoshitsune Asama (阿佐馬 芳経, Asama Yoshitsune)
Voiced by: Jun Fukuyama (Japanese); Kieran Regan (English)
Yoshitsune is an egocentric and clever swordsman of the prestigious Asama clan, who aims for a high position to lead the government.

=== Yamato ===
Denki Taira (平 殿器, Taira Denki)
Voiced by: Takashi Nagasako (Japanese); Steve Mize (English)
Denki is Yamato's megalomaniac Prime Minister of Home Affairs with a penchant for swift executions.
Mitsuhide Ryumon (龍門 光英, Ryūmon Mitsuhide)
Voiced by: Kazuhiro Yamaji (Japanese); Ron Banks (English)
Ryumon is the diligent and dependable General of the Borderland Army.
Yasuaki Kaku (賀来 泰明, Kaku Yasuaki)
Voiced by: Yuichi Nakamura (Japanese); Tom Choi (English)
Kaku is Mitsuhide's genius right-hand man and tactician.
Fuji III (藤3世, Fuji 3-sei)
Voiced by: Taihi Kimura (Japanese); Michael Sinterniklaas (English)
The cowardly figurehead ruler of Yamato and Denki's son-in-law.
Go Sugo (菅生 強, Sugō Gō)
Voiced by: Ryōta Takeuchi (Japanese); Brent Mukai (English)
Sugo is the Borderland General's Right Vice-General, a patient man of few words.
Shiryo Nagamine (長嶺 士遼, Nagamine Shiryō)
Voiced by: Shunsuke Takeuchi (Japanese); Andrew Kishino (English)
Nagamine is the Borderland General's Left Vice-General, a cutthroat man of action.
Tonotsugu Taira (平 殿継, Taira Tonotsugu)
Voiced by: Ayumu Murase (Japanese); Michael Johnston (English)
Denki's precocious and petulant youngest son, who is given command of the Fukui forces.
Junichi Tamaki (玉置 准一, Tamaki Junichi)
Voiced by: Kazuyuki Okitsu (Japanese); Darius Johnson (English)
Tamaki is the Assistant Librarian of Yamato and Tonotsugu's tutor.
Yoshinaga Sato (佐藤 義長, Satō Yoshinaga)
Voiced by: Yōji Ueda (Japanese); Paul St. Peter (English)
Sato is the dependable commander of Kuzuryu Castle.
Hina Hiraizumi (平泉 緋那, Hiraizumi Hina)
Voiced by: Chinatsu Akasaki (Japanese); Kristen McGuire (English)
Hiraizumi is the fiercely loyal assistant to the commander of Kuzuryu Castle.
Kinta Moriyama (守山 金汰, Moriyama Kinta)
Voiced by: Nobuaki Kanemitsu (Japanese); Brook Chalmers (English)
Moriyama is the Archivist Director of the Borderland Forces who is charmed by Ohga.
Saki Higashimachi (東町 小紀, Higashimachi Saki)
Voiced by: Asami Seto (Japanese); Ratana (English)
Aoteru's righteous and no-nonsense wife.
Shiori Taira (平 汐莉, Taira Shiori)
Denki's cheerful daughter and later Yoshitsune's wife.

=== Seii ===
Ohga Wajima (輪島 桜虎, Wajima Ōga)
Voiced by: Minami Tsuda (Japanese); Jennifer Sun Bell (English)
Ohga is the new Supreme Commander of Seii, who took power through a coup, to avenge her father Byakko, a previous Seii Supreme Commander that was killed in conflict with Yamato.
Yayakichi Hei (閉伊 弥々吉, Hei Yayakichi)
Voiced by: Kenyu Horiuchi (Japanese); June Yoon (English)
Yayakichi is the senior strategist of Seii, who raised Ohga alongside his children and supports her in the war with Yamato.
Aterui Kura (九羅 亜輝威, Kura Aterui)
Voiced by: Shunsuke Sakuya (Japanese); Michael Sorich (English)
Kura is a battle-hungry soldier and Seii's Military Affairs Supervisor.
Muuton Nagao (長尾武兎惇, Nagao Mūton)
Voiced by: Shūichirō Umeda (Japanese); John Patneaude (English)
Muuton is a young soldier seeking for Ohga's affection and Seii's Negotiation Supervisor.
Yasuke Hei (閉伊 弥輔, Hei Yasuke)
Voiced by: Atsushi Tamaru (Japanese); Clifford Chapin (English)
Yasuke is Yayakichi's younger son who follows in his footsteps as shrewd strategist.
Daisuke Hei (閉伊 大吉, Hei Daisuke)
Voiced by: Tsuguo Mogami (Japanese); Jamison Boaz (English)
Daisuke is Yayakichi's older passionate, but dim son and 2nd Division Commander.
Jien Hibi (日比 慈延, Hibi Jien)
Voiced by: Seiichiro Yamashita (Japanese); David McKahan (English)
Jien is the 1st Division Commander of the Seii army.
Haruichi Azami (芥生 葉瑠壱, Azami Haruichi)
Voiced by: Shinpachi Tsuji (Japanese); Paul St. Peter (English)
Azami is the 8th president of Seii, who took power after the loss of Byakko Wajima.

=== Buo ===
Momokuni Hojo (北条 桃国, Hojo Momokuni)
Voiced by: Hōchū Ōtsuka (Japanese); William Salyers (English)
Hojo is the elderly, but jovial and exploitative leader of Buo, who speaks with early Reiwa-era phrases.
Juro Musashikami (武神 十郎, Musashikami Juro)
Voiced by: Chō (Japanese); Michael Johnston (English)
Musashikami is the elderly, but still capable strategist of Buo, who mostly whispers or mumbles and an interpreter speaks for him.
Himehito Okimi (大君 姫人, Okimi Himehito)
Voiced by: Takeo Ōtsuka (Japanese); Brent Mukai (English)
Okimi is a clever young descendant of the pre-Sangoku era royalty and distant relative of Fuji III, who fled to Buo.

== Media ==
=== Manga ===
Written and illustrated by Ikka Matsuki, Nippon Sangoku began serialization on Shogakukan's Ura Sunday website and MangaONE app on November 24, 2021. Its chapters have been compiled into seven tankōbon volumes as of April 2026.

On June 1, 2026, Matsuki announced the manga was going on hiatus due to him recovering from steroid withdrawal syndrome.

No.	Release date	ISBN
1	March 10, 2022	978-4-09-851030-6
1. Taihei no Chikai (泰平の誓い); 2. Aoteru Jōhan (青輝上阪); 3. Tōryūmon (登龍門); Bonus: Nenpyō Jinbutsu Shōkai (年表・人物紹介)
2	July 19, 2022	978-4-09-851206-5
4. Chōgi (朝議); 5. Misumi Kanji (三角監事); 6. Seii Seihen (聖夷政変); 7. Ketsui Hyōmei (決意表明); 8. Kuniku no Kei (苦肉の計); 9. Kaku no Rongi (賀来の論議); 10. Henkyō Shōgun-tai, Shutsujin (辺境将軍隊、出陣); Bonus: Jinbutsu Shōkai 2 Soshikizu (人物紹介②・組織図)
3	December 12, 2022	978-4-09-851448-9
11. Muuton no Wana (武兎惇の罠); 12. Kaisen Zen'ya (開戦前夜); 13. Seii Seisei (聖夷西征); 14. Kanazawa Yashū (金沢夜襲); 15. Ryūko Kessen (龍虎決戦); Bonus: Kōzoku Shizoku Jinbutsu Shōkai 3 (皇族氏族・人物紹介③)
4	June 12, 2023	978-4-09-852016-9
16. Naite Yayakichi o Kiru (泣いて弥々吉を斬る); 17. Kyūteki Saikai (仇敵再会); 18. Aoteru no Dai Ronjin (青輝の大論陣); 19. Maki ni Fushite Ten o Satosu (薪に臥して天を諭す); 20. Kaku no Nokiguchi (賀来の退き口); 21. Seii Metsubō (聖夷滅亡); Bonus: Seii Soshikizu Jinbutsu Shōkai 4 (聖夷組織図・人物紹介④)
5	July 11, 2024	978-4-09-853298-8
22. Taira Kōgō Hōgyo (平皇后崩御); 23. Aoteru Taisha (青輝大赦); 24. Tenma-ō Taira Denki (天満王・平 殿器); 25. Sumihito-ō no Kyohei (澄仁王の挙兵); 26. Kasagiyama no Tatakai (笠置山の戦い); 27. Renkan no Kei (連環の計); 28. Yoshitsune Shutsujin (芳経出陣); 29. Kasagi no Kuma (笠置の熊); 30. Kasagi Kanraku (笠置陥落); 31. Bakaku Ketsugi (馬角結義); Bonus: Nenpyō Jinbutsu Shōkai 5 (年表・人物紹介⑤)
6	November 12, 2024	978-4-09-853709-9
32. Tenma-ō Tōsei (天満王東征); 33. Okuwa Shutsugun (奥和出軍); 34. Sendai no Tatakai (仙台の戦い); 35. Sekiganrō (隻眼狼); 36. Ō Yukigassen (大雪合戦); 37. Kanō no Sentaku (狩野の選択); 38. Onihito Kanō Chiyo (鬼人・狩野千代); 39. Ōkami Oni Kessen (狼鬼決戦); 40. Sendai no Meiun (仙台の命運); 41. Hakua no Yabō (珀亜の野望); 42. Seiki, Dan-no-ura e (青輝、壇ノ浦へ); 43. Mōri-ke (毛利家); 44. Katsumoku Sōdai (刮目相待); Bonus: Sōkanzu Jinbutsu Shōkai 6 (相関図・人物紹介⑥)
7	April 10, 2026	978-4-09-854207-9
45. Yamaguchi Shisatsu (山口視察); 46. Kōmon no Kai (閘門之会); 47. Dan-no-ura Jihen (壇ノ浦事変); 48. Gisho no Kei (贋書の計); 49. Hyakuman Isshin (百万一心); Bonus: Gunsō Kubunzu Jinbutsu Shōkai 7 (軍装・区分図・人物紹介⑦)

=== Anime ===
An anime television series adaptation was announced on January 27, 2026. The series was produced by Studio Kafka, co-produced with Amazon MGM Studios, and directed by Kazuaki Terasawa, with Teruko Utsumi handling series composition, Takahiko Abiru designing the characters and serving as chief animation director, and Kevin Penkin composing the music. Megumi Han provided the narration. It aired from April 7 to June 23, 2026, on Tokyo MX and BS NTV. (Note: Tokyo MX listed the series premiere at 24:00 on April 6, 2026, which is effectively April 7 at midnight JST.) The opening theme song is "Hidane" (火種; 'Flashpoint'), performed by Tatsuya Kitani, and the ending theme song is "Chikai" (誓い; 'Oath'), performed by Leina. Amazon Prime Video began streaming the series worldwide on April 5, two days before the scheduled broadcast on Japanese linear television.

A sequel was announced on September 3, 2026.

==== Episodes ====
No.	Title	Directed by (Note: Production staff information is taken from the ending credits of each episode.)	Written by	Storyboarded by	Original release date
1	"An Oath for Peace"; Transliteration: "Taihei no Chikai" (Japanese: 泰平の誓い)	Kazuaki Terasawa	Teruko Utsumi	Kazuaki Terasawa	April 7, 2026
Towards the end of the Reiwa era, Japan experiences a major economic crisis. Following a nuclear war, Japan experiences a refugee influx, which leads to social collapse and technological regression. During the Sankoku period, three nations fight for control of the country. In the nation of Yamato, Aoteru Misumi, a scholarly agricultural officer, marries the headstrong Saki Higashimachi. Their village in the Ehime Prefecture is visited by Denki Taira, the corrupt Lord of Home Affairs, who orders a tax inspection. While Aoteru is timid, Saki encourages her husband to stand up for what is right. She stops an unscrupulous tax collector from terrorizing a fellow villager and beats him with his own stick. Later, Saki is beheaded by the Taira clan for stopping the tax collector and insulting Denki. Aoteru seeks an audience with Denki and defends Saki's honor. Impressed by his courage and understanding the tax collector is the one who directly did the insult, Denki orders the execution of the tax collector. Before leaving to mourn Saki's death, Aoteru quotes a passage from Sun Tzu about the use of deception in warfare.
2	"Toryumon"; Transliteration: "Tōryūmon" (Japanese: 登龍門)	Himari Tamagawa	Teruko Utsumi	Kazuaki Terasawa	April 14, 2026
The eastern nation of Buo invades Aichi in Yamato territory. Despite their superior numbers, the invaders surrender after Mitsuhide Ryumon, the Yamato borderland general, leads a successful decapitation strike against the Buo commanders and convinces the remaining officers and troops to surrender in return for land. After burying Saki, Aoteru moves to the Yamato capital Osaka to participate in the Toryumon, an entrance exam for the elite Borderland General Corps. While staying at a hotel, Aoteru meets Yoshitsune Asama, an ambitious noble who is a skilled swordsman. Yoshitsune uses his combat skills to drive off several thugs. Aoteru also has a philosophical discussion with Yoshitsune, whose combative nature clashes with Aoteru's introspective nature. The two participate in the Toryumon exam, which involves attempting to force Ryumon to bend his knee. Several applicants try the test but fail. Yoshitsune proceeds to advance on Ryumon with his sword.
3	"Imperial Council"; Transliteration: "Chōgi" (Japanese: 朝議)	Yoji Sato	Teruko Utsumi	Hiromitsu Kanazawa	April 21, 2026
While Ryumon blocks Yoshitsune's first attack, he is forced to bend his knee after Yoshitsune hits him with a follow-up attack. Having passed the test, Ryumon inducts him into the Borderland Corps. Taking a different approach, Aoteru briefs Ryumon about his proposed agricultural policy to boost agricultural production in the Borderlands by using soldiers as farmers. Impressed, Ryumon willingly kneels before Aoteru, inducting him to the Borderland Corps. Three years pass and Aoteru's agricultural policy is successfully implemented, boosting Yamato's agricultural production while ensuring a strong military presence in the Borderlands. With Yamato's northern neighbor Seii facing famine and social collapse, Ryumon advises Fuji III, the emperor, to negotiate a truce with Seii with the goal of commencing modest trade relations. However, Denki counsels Fuji III to instead invade Seii, having already sent a letter demanding their unconditional surrender without the latter's approval. When several court officials oppose Denki's plan, Denki has his troops execute the dissenters. As such, a cowardly Fuji III accedes to Denki's plan. Sensing trouble ahead, Aoteru and Yoshitsune resolve to support Ryumon. Denki's missive later arrives in Seii.
4	"The Seii Coup"; Transliteration: "Seii Seihen" (Japanese: 聖夷政変)	Arou Morita	Akimine Takahashi	Arou Morita	April 28, 2026
Aoteru rises to the position of auditor general in the Borderland Corps and develops a reputation for his zero tolerance of corruption, ordering the hanging of a corrupt deputy auditor who murdered three citizens and sexually assaulted their daughter. While Yoshitsune balks at his friend's zeal and refusal to grant favors to colleagues, Aoteru counters that corruption undermines public trust in the Yamato government. Meanwhile, Seii's corrupt government is about to surrender to Yamato's demands when a militant faction led by Commander Ohga Wajima stages a coup d’état and executes the President Haruichi Azami. While preparing for war with Yamato, Ohga embarks on a campaign to win the hearts and minds of her impoverished subjects by distributing rice porridge from the state's stores.
5	"The Borderland General Corps Marches Out"; Transliteration: "Henkyō Shōgun-tai, Shutsujin" (Japanese: 辺境将軍隊、出陣)	Miho Nagisa	Teruko Utsumi	Miho Nagisa	May 5, 2026
Ryumon learns from a spy that Seii may be preparing to attack and offers to travel to Fukui near the border to investigate. When Fuji III expresses his support for the plan, they are interrupted by Denki. Just then, grand archivist Tonotsugu Taira, Denki's son, brings news that Muuton Nagao, Seii's chief negotiator and governor of Kaga Province, has offered to defect to Yamato with his soldiers and territory after he was supposedly sent to Kaga as punishment. Tonotsugu recommends that troops and supplies be sent immediately to Kaga, but Ryumon suspects that it is a trap by Ohga. However, Denki insists that Fuji III sends 30,000 troops from Fukui to Kaga and that Ryumon lead 5,000 soldiers to support Tonotsugu. Ryumon meets his strategist, Yasuaki Kaku, who also suspects a trap, and they develop their own plan, leaving a skeleton force that includes Aoteru and Yoshitsune to hold the fort. Ryumon also imprisons one of his officers Moriyami, who is sympathetic to Ohga and advocates defecting to her side.
6	"Eve of War"; Transliteration: "Kaisen Zen'ya" (Japanese: 開戦前夜)	Shūjirō Ami	Teruko Utsumi	Shūjirō Ami	May 12, 2026
Tonotsugu sets out for Kanazawa, protected by Ryumon and is accompanied by Right Lieutenant General Goh Sugoh of the Borderland General Corps. Leading a force of 1,000 soldiers, Left Lieutenant General Shiryo Nagamine is posted in Daishoji, while Ryumon and Kaku, leading a rear force of 3,000, reach Fukui Reihoku Castle. At Kanazawa Castle, Kaga, Ohga receives news that Tonotsugu has reached Kaga. Ohga interrogates Nagao by beating him publicly, although Nagao is secretly supporting Ohga, and has his messenger report back that Yamato should attack Kaga. At the Tedori River outside Kaga, Tonotsugu receives news that Kanazawa is poorly defended and decides to cross the bridge. When Sugoh urges caution, Tonotsugu has him arrested. Once Ryumon hears this news, he decides not to proceed to Kanazawa. Meanwhile, Seii forces led by Aterui Kura break through the Tani Tunnel, invade Okuetsu, and attack Kuzuryu Castle. Second-in-command Hina Hiraizumi suggests that Castellan Yoshinaga Sato request reinforcements from Osaka, but Kura breaches the castle walls. He offers freedom to the inhabitants if he receives the head of the castellan. Instead of surrendering, the Yamato forces ride out to defend the castle.
7	"The Kanazawa Night Raid"; Transliteration: "Kanazawa Yashū" (Japanese: 金沢夜襲)	Himari Tamagawa	Akimine Takahashi	Tetsuo Hirakawa	May 19, 2026
Following the battle of Kuzuryu Castle, Kura's forces capture 12 castles and the surrounding countryside in Yamato. At Kanazawa Castle, Nagao puts into action his plan to eliminate Tonotsugu and Sugoh's forces in support of Ohga's war effort. The 12,000-strong Yamato garrison at Kanazawa is dispersed across several camps while the officers are housed in inns along a narrow street. Under Nagao's orders, his forces eliminate several officers and staff, including Tonotsugu's dark-skinned servant Tama. Surviving the assassination attempt, Tonotsugu apologizes to Sugoh for humiliating him and allows the general to assume command of the Yamato forces in Kanazawa. Nagao attempts to kill the duo but is killed by Nagamine, who helps Sugoh lead a retreat of the Yamato forces out of enemy territory. Back in Osaka, Aoteru and Yoshitsune deal with an increasingly jingoistic Yamato population, seeking retribution against the Seii invaders. Aoteru believes that the war is being manipulated by war profiteers with ulterior motives.
8	"Dragon vs. Tiger"; Transliteration: "Ryūko Kessen" (Japanese: 龍虎決戦)	Kenji Takahashi	Akimine Takahashi	Kenji Takahashi	May 26, 2026
Following the failed Seii night raid on Kanazawa, Ohga hunts and kills a white snake at waterfall near Daishizan Seidai-ji Temple. Later, she rallies the Seii army by relating to their struggles as soldiers. While the Seii army pillages the Yamato countryside, Ryumon and his forces remained camped by the Kuzuryu River, which serves as a barrier between the Seii and Yamato armies. He has been joined by Sugoh and Tonotsugu's forces, who have escaped Nagao's trap at Kanazawa. While his officers express frustration at Ryumon's perceived inaction, the General uses the Empty Fort Strategy to slow down Ohga's advancing army. He sets up a tea ceremony on the bridge of the river. Ohga confronts him and seriously wounds him. Believing that the Yamato forces are waiting in ambush, Ohga orders a retreat. Besides slowing down the Seii invasion, the incident undermines her army's morale and trust in their leader. Seeing potential in Aoteru, Ryumon had sent him a letter prior to the confrontation with Ohga. In Osaka, Aoteru and Yoshitsune receive Ryumon's letter.
9	"Tears for Yayakichi"; Transliteration: "Naite Yayakichi o Kiru" (Japanese: 泣いて弥々吉を斬る)	Miho Nagisa	Teruko Utsumi	Tetsuya Endō	June 2, 2026
In Osaka, Sugoh and Kaku supervise the evacuation of civilians. Sugoh advises Kaku to close the city gates but the latter is unwilling to deny safety to refugees. Shortly after, the seriously wounded Ryumon arrives on a stretcher. Kaku soon collapses from exhaustion. Following the Seii army's retreat from Kuzuryu River, the Seii army's trust in Ohga plunges. To restore faith in her leadership, Yayakichi Hei, Ohga's strategist, takes the blame for her failures and stages a coup attempt against Ohga. As planned, the coup is defeated and Yayakichi is tried for mutiny. While several officers urge clemency for the respected strategist, one of Yayakichi's two sons, Yasuke, convinces Ohga to execute his father for treason. Prior to the coup, Yayakichi had briefed Yasuke and his brother Painache about his plan to sacrifice himself in order to restore trust and morale in Ohga's leadership, whom he regards as the savior of the Seii nation. Yayakichi also confesses to killing Ohga's older brothers and allowing the killing of Yamato civilians. Ohga sentences Yayakichi to death by crucifixion and vows to lead the reinvigorated Seii army to victory over Yamato. In Yamato, Aoteru receives urgent news.
10	"Reunion of Mortal Enemies"; Transliteration: "Kyūteki Saikai" (Japanese: 仇敵再会)	Yoji Sato	Akimine Takahashi	Hiromitsu Kanazawa	June 9, 2026
Following Yayakichi's execution, Ohga restores morale and discipline in the Seii army. She and her commanders come up with a plan to lure the Yamato army into a trap in the frozen heartlands of Seii. Back in Osaka, a recovering Ryumon visits the ill Kaku, who had been using a concoction of drugs to stave off an unspecified illness. Seeking to put Kaku's strategy into action, Aoteru seeks an audience with Fuji III but is obstructed by a highborn palace guard. Denki arrives and uses his authority to compel the palace guards to grant Aoteru an audience with Fuji III. He also orders the execution of the corrupt guard. Inside the throne room, Denki and his court allies attempt to convince Fuji III to strip Ryumon of his post based on unsubstantiated lies. They also attempt to smear Aoteru's reputation. Denki then urges Fuji III to give him command of the Borderland forces that would invade Seii. Aoteru refutes Denki's lies and defends Ryumon. He also urges Fuji III and his advisers to retain Ryumon in his post and withdraw Yamato's forces. Meanwhile, Yoshitsune is jealous that Aoteru has secured an audience with Fuji III but keeps his promise to continue on an unspecified mission.
11	"Lie on Firewood and Council the Heavens"; Transliteration: "Maki ni Fushite Ten o Satosu" (Japanese: 薪に臥して天を諭す)	Himari Tamagawa	Teruko Utsumi	Yoshimitsu Ōhashi	June 16, 2026
At Fuji III's court, Aoteru advises Fuji III to order Ryumon and the Borderland Corps to launch a feigned retreat with the goal of luring the Seii army into a trap in Ota. To avoid tensions with Buo and creating a three-front war, he also counsels Fuji III not to deploy Yamato forces to Fukui. Despite Denki's objections, Fuji III accepts Aoteru's plan and sends Yoshitsune to deliver the withdrawal order to Ryumon. In private, Denki meets with one of his advisors to discuss the threat posed by Aoteru to the Taira clan's ambitions and interests. Denki also admits to assassinating the previous Emperor. Meanwhile, Ohga appoints a new commander named Ateri to replace the late Yayakichi. Her army advances farther south into Yamato territory, threatening the forces of Ryumon and Tonotsugu. At Fukui Reikohu Castle, a pleased Ryumon receives Fuji III's withdrawal orders from Yoshitsune.
12	"The Fall of Seii"; Transliteration: "Seii Metsubō" (Japanese: 聖夷滅亡)	Kazuaki Terasawa & Arou Morita	Teruko Utsumi	Kazuaki Terasawa	June 23, 2026
Under Fuji III's orders, Ryumon withdraws his army away from Fukui Reikohu Castle. Meanwhile, Ohga's forces pursue Ryumon's forces to Ota where they are lured by Yoshitsune into a trap that involves dumping cars on the advancing Seii army. With her forces decimated, Ohga surrenders to the Borderland Corps. Due to the defeat of Ohga's army, Buo's government cancels plans to attack Osaka. A young Buo official named Himehito Ohkimi observes the developments with interest. The ill Kaku dies while traveling back to Osaka. Yamato and Seii proceed to sign a peace treaty and begin the process of reunification, with a demilitarized zone established in Shiga. However, Denki sabotages this by assassinating Ohga and framing Ryumon, Aoteru, and the leadership of the Borderland Corps as the perpetrators. He also reduces Fuji III to a figurehead monarch for listening to Aoteru. Based on false pretexts, Denki invades and annexes Seii. Elsewhere, an imprisoned Aoteru resolves to reunite Japan.

== Reception ==
The series was nominated for the eighth Next Manga Awards in 2022 in the web category and was ranked 17th out of 50 nominees. It was also nominated for the ninth edition in 2023. The series was ranked 12th, alongside Fool Night and Kujima: Why Sing, When You Can Warble?, in the 2023 edition of Takarajimasha's Kono Manga ga Sugoi! guidebook for the best manga for male readers. The series was nominated for the 16th Manga Taishō and was ranked fifth alongside A Witch's Life in Mongol. The series ranked third in the Nationwide Publishers Recommended Comics of 2023 list. The series was ranked 22nd in Da Vinci's "Book of the Year" list in 2023.
