= Turn A Gundam =

1999 Japanese mecha anime series

- ∀ガンダム
- Genre: Mecha; Military science fiction
- Created by: Hajime Yatate; Yoshiyuki Tomino
- Directed by: Yoshiyuki Tomino (chief)
- Character designers: Akira Yasuda (original); Yoshihito Hishi
- Music by: Yoko Kanno
- No. of episodes: 50 (list of episodes)

Production
- Producers: Hideyuki Tomioka (Fuji TV); Yoshihiro Suzuki (Sunrise)
- Production companies: Fuji Television; Sunrise

Original release
- Networks: Fuji TV, KTV, THK, uhb, TNC, mit, SAY, KSS, FTV, BBT
- Release: April 9, 1999 – April 14, 2000

Related
Further information
Manga
Written by	Kōichi Tokita
Published by	Kodansha
Magazine	Comic BomBom
Original run	April 15, 1999 – March 15, 2000
Volumes	2
Manga
Written by	Yoshiyuki Tomino
Illustrated by	Atsushi Soga
Published by	Kodansha
Magazine	Magazine Z
Original run	June 26, 1999 – March 2002
Volumes	5
Anime film
Turn A Gundam I: Earth Light
Directed by	Yoshiyuki Tomino
Studio	Sunrise
Licensed by	NA: Sunrise
Released	February 9, 2002
Runtime	129 minutes
Anime film
Turn A Gundam II: Moonlight Butterfly
Directed by	Yoshiyuki Tomino
Studio	Sunrise
Licensed by	NA: Sunrise
Released	February 10, 2002
Runtime	127 minutes
Manga
Turn A Gundam: Tsuki no Kaze
Written by	Akira Yasuda
Published by	Kadokawa Shoten
Magazine	Gundam Ace
Original run	2004 – 2005
Volumes	1

Turn A Gundam (Japanese: ∀(ターンエー)ガンダム, Hepburn: Tān Ē Gandamu), also stylized as Ɐ Gundam, is a 1999 Japanese mecha anime series produced by Sunrise, and aired between 1999 and 2000 on Fuji Television and other channels. It was created for the Gundam Big Bang 20th Anniversary celebration, and is the eighth installment in the Gundam franchise. It was later compiled in 2002 into two feature-length films entitled Turn A Gundam I: Earth Light and Turn A Gundam II: Moonlight Butterfly.

Turn A Gundam was directed by Yoshiyuki Tomino, who is the main creator of the Gundam franchise, and who had written and directed many previous Gundam works. Tomino created the series as a means of "affirmatively accepting all of the Gundam series", which is reflected in the series title's use of the turned A, a mathematical symbol representing universal quantification.

== Overview ==
Turn A Gundam takes place in the year Correct Century 2345 (正暦2345年, Seireki Nisen Sanbyaku Yonjū Go Nen; CC 2345), in a different calendar era than the previous Gundam projects. The Japanese term for Correct Century, Seireki, is a wordplay on the Japanese term for the Common Era (CE) Western calendar system (西暦; pronounced Seireki). The population of the Earth is, at the beginning of the series, limited to simple, steam-driven and gasoline-powered technology after past cataclysms; the Moon is populated by the Moonrace, humans who left Earth after a great war long ago to reside in technologically advanced lunar colonies until such time as they deemed the Earth suitable to return to.

== Plot ==
Turn A Gundam follows the character Loran Cehack, a young member of the Moonrace. Selected as part of a reconnaissance mission to determine whether the Earth was fit for resettlement, Loran lands on the continent of North America, spends two years living on Earth as the chauffeur to the Heim family, and grows attached to its people. With the expectation of a peaceful resettlement operation from his people, he and a pair of his close friends sent down with him confirm that the Earth is now fit for the Moonrace to make their return. He's taken by surprise when the Moonrace intends to return to Earth via an offensive with mobile suits, and their first attack sparks a violent conflict between Earth and moon.

The night of the first attack, Loran is at the White Doll, an enormous humanoid statue, for a coming-of-age ceremony. When the Moonrace attacks and the battle in town can be seen from a distance the children panic. In the midst of this panic, the White Doll shatters, revealing a metallic figure within, and the shrine collapses around it. During the panic, Loran recognizes the White Doll as a mobile suit, and succeeds in applying his knowledge of the Moonrace's mobile suits to pilot it. The death of the Heim patriarch in the attack pulls the family and Loran into the budding war; Loran becomes the designated pilot of the White Doll, and its discovery prompts the excavation of further mobile suits in the various "mountain cycles" covering the Earth. As the Moonrace's invasion rapidly turns into a full-fledged war against the increasingly armed Earthrace, it becomes clear that this state of affairs is divisive among both groups; while the Moonrace's queen Dianna Soreil attempts to negotiate with the local leaders for a peaceful solution by which the Moonrace can come to reside on the Earth, the militaristic among both populations interfere with the negotiations again and again, forcing the war to continue as opposed to accepting a compromise.

== Media ==
=== Anime ===
The series aired 50 episodes in Japan from April 9, 1999, to April 14, 2000, on Fuji TV, being the only Gundam anime to air on said channel. It was directed by Yoshiyuki Tomino and produced by Hideyuki Tomioka, Takayuki Yoshii, and Yoshihiro Suzuki. Character designs was by Akira Yasuda and Yoshihito Hishinuma while mecha designs were done by Atsushi Shigeta, Kunio Okawara, Syd Mead, Takumi Sakura. Shigemi Ikeda directed the art and Yota Tsuruoka directed the sound. Toshiaki Ohta and Yoko Kanno composed the music.

The eponymous Turn A Gundam is notable because it is the first Gundam mecha designed entirely by a foreigner, the famous American visual futurist and conceptual artist Syd Mead. The first design of the new Gundam created by Mead was rejected at first by Yoshiyuki due to its extremely exotic appearance, since Tomino decided that he wanted a figure closer to previous Gundam designs. Because of its quality and impressive appearance, the old design was not discarded at all by Tomino, instead renamed and used by him as the antagonist mobile suit design Sumo.

Mead designed the Turn A Gundam using real world industrial design aspects, which were aimed to make it look simple and realistic. The shield was one of the components designed by Syd Mead with little constraint from the production team. It needed to be big enough so that the suit could hide behind it, making it easier for the anime production staff to draw. Syd Mead imagined it to be like a clam shell and finally settled with a design that looked like the old MS-14 Gelgoog's shield from the first series.

Turn A Gundam is the last entry of the Gundam franchise (not counting the compilations and future video game cut scenes) to be mostly hand painted on cels. Mobile Suit Gundam SEED, released in 2002, was the first series to switch entirely to digital ink and paint.

The series had two films releases, Turn A Gundam I: Earth Light released February 9, 2002, and Turn A Gundam II: Moonlight Butterfly released February 10, 2002. The films were a condensed retelling of the 50 episodes between the two.

=== Manga ===
The series had two manga adaptations. One by Kōichi Tokita published by Kodansha Ltd. running from April 15, 1999, to March 15, 2000, through Comic BomBom Magazine. Another written by Yoshiyuki Tomino running from June 26, 1999, to March, 2002 that was published by Kodansha Ltd. In their magazine, Monthly Magazine Z.

There would be a manga release that would serve as a prequel for the main series titled, Turn A Gundam: Tsuki no Kaze written by Akira Yasuda that would be published by Kadokawa Shoten in their magazine, Gundam Ace running from March 2004 to March 2005. The manga would follow a younger Loran prior to the events of the main show or manga. Here it is shown the process that Loran and the other characters training to for the upcoming reconnaissance mission on earth. As well as introduce how Loran would eventually be selected for the mission, and send off to earth.

== Relationship with other Gundam series ==
Turn A Gundam has been cited by Director Tomino and other sources as a show that would unify the stories from the various Gundam series into one. Throughout the show, mobile suits resembling those from the eras depicted in previous Gundam shows and indicated to be preserved by nano machines for thousands of years, including as those of the Universal Century, are excavated by the show's various factions. In Episode 42, this plotline comes to a culmination as the history of the Correct Century timeline is shown in a collection of clips known as the Dark History (黒歴史, Kuro Rekishi), which is revealed to be events that took place in different Gundam series prior to Turn A Gundam, thus implying that those events may also be part of the Correct Century timeline's history.

The book 2001 Correct Century, A Bibliographical Study of "Dark History", printed in black pages in front of the Universal Century Gundam Officials Encyclopedia, is supposedly uncovered by a fictional Lecturer in Black History named Yokk Wakk Onimott during Correct Century 1993. Onimott spends two years to fix the broken pages, five years to interpret the language, and a year to find a publisher. He states that the book was first printed around 3,000 years ago by the Rhea branch of the Earth Federation Government University. Included in the book is a picture drawn by Kunio Okawara showing a mobile suit supposed to be MS-04 as a S.U.I.T. project of the Zeon forces in UC0072~0075. It supposedly was found in 1993 Correct Century in the mountain cycle Library A-a. The white page introduction by another fictional writer, Minaka Junkers, an economy assistant professor of the Rhea branch of the Earth Federation Government University, states the book was published in UC0100 to celebrate the Centennial anniversary of the Universal Century. Thus it is officially claimed that the Universal Century is a time before Correct Century, possibly around 3,000 years before the story of Turn A begins.

Later sources would greatly increase the time frame between the two. The official English Gundam.info Archives website, created by Sunrise, describes Correct Century as, "similar to early 20th Century America, but is actually set tens of thousands of years in the distant future and incorporates every Universal Century and Another Gundam timeline that ever existed." The manual for the Master Grade Turn X gunpla, released in June 2014, would further attempt to expand what is covered by the Dark History as the original Mobile Suit Gundam marking the beginning of humanity's space age, and Turn A as the final result, with all other Gundam series, including those that were produced prior to Turn A: G Gundam, Gundam Wing, and Gundam X, and those produced after: Gundam SEED, Gundam 00, and Gundam AGE, taking place in the tens of thousands of years in between the two shows.

This is the literal interpretation of it, but in reality, it has never been made particularly clear how these different Gundam histories are supposed to connect.

In fact, trying to connect them all creates serious problems: the civilization collapse (the resetting of the world) said to have occurred during the period leading up to Turn A would have to happen as many times as there are alternative universes just to make the timeline work. And even if that were the case, there would still be considerable inconsistencies.

Furthermore, the current official Gundam website as well as official series promotional billboards, anniversary projects, spin-off games and notably the recent mobile game Mobile Suit Gundam U.C. ENGAGE, which is a work setting out to include everything exclusively related to the Universal Century universe, lists Turn A as a work belonging to the Universal Century (UC), while making no mention of the other series. There is also the existence of officially approved works such as Gundam EXA, which treats all of the Gundam universes, including Turn A, as existing in its past as part of its setting which further complicates the issue.

Furthermore, Yoshiyuki Tomino specified in an interview that Gundam: Reconguista in G takes place hundreds to thousands of years after the event of Turn A and thus after the Correct Century timeline. This is seen with the Moonlight Butterfly, which is used in that show as a past technology. To further complicate this, the game SD Gundam Battle Alliance has the protagonist of Reconguista, Bellri Zenam, being aware of the Dark History and recognizing the Turn X. This contradicted official Sunrise-published marketing materials, which up to that point had depicted it as occurring approximately 1000 years after the end of the Universal Century and thousand of years before Correct Century.

Yoshiyuki Tomino himself has stated at the "Nighttime G-Reco Study Group – Yoshiyuki Tomino Edition" event held on August 27, 2015, that he would like fans of the Gundam series to "create their own version of the complete history of Gundam".

The exhibition The World of Yoshiyuki Tomino, held from June 22, 2019, to January 23, 2022, was supervised, supported, and promoted by Sunrise. Following Tomino's own stance, it states that Reconguista in G is set far in the future, long after Turn A, demonstrating that while there is disagreement between the company and the creator, both interpretations are approved and considered valid by Sunrise.

Both Turn A and Reconguista in G used to be treated as either Alternative universes (or AUs for short, which refers to series that are set outside of the UC timeline) or both UC and AU but have, since 2021, consistently been treated as belonging exclusively to the UC. The recent book, Mobile Suit Gundam Alternative Series: A Complete Dissection, released in 2025, further corroborates this by specifically saying that they are not AUs.

== Music ==
Openings:

- "Turn A Turn" (ターンAターン, Tān Ē Tān) by Hideki Saijo (Ep. 2-38)
- "Century Color" by RAY-GUNS (Ep. 39 – 50)

Endings:

- "Aura" by Shinji Tanimura (Ep. 1 – 40)
- "Tsuki no Mayu" (月の繭; Moon's Cocoon) by Yoko Kanno (sung by Aki Okui) (Ep. 41–49)
- "Kagirinaki Tabiji" (限りなき旅路; The Endless Journey) by Aki Okui (Ep. 50)
- "After All" by Donna Burke (First compilation film ending)
- "Tsuki no Mayu" (Moon's Cocoon) by Yoko Kanno (sung by Aki Okui) (Second compilation film ending ~ In its full version right before the ending credits which are instrumental only)

Inserts:

- "Moon" by Gabriela Robin (a.k.a. Yoko Kanno)
- "Overnight Festival" (宵越しの祭り, Yoigoshi no Matsuri) by White Doll no Matsuri no Kaiichidou
- "Queen of the Night" (月下美人, Gekka Bijin) by Hideki Saijo
- "The Spirit of the Moon" (月の魂, Tsuki no Tama) by RRET Team
- "Black History" by Kaoru Nishino

== North American release ==
On July 22, 2010, Bandai Entertainment announced that they had acquired the license to release Turn A Gundam in the United States and that they were planning to release the series on Region 1 DVD in 2011. The release was cancelled in January 2012 when Bandai Entertainment announced it would no longer offer any new products in the North American territory.

On October 11, 2014, at their 2014 New York Comic Con panel, Sunrise announced they will be releasing all of the Gundam franchise, including Turn A Gundam in North America though distribution from Right Stuf Inc., beginning in Spring 2015.

On March 11, 2015, Right Stuf Inc. announced that the first 25 episodes will be released on June 30, 2015. Sunrise and Right Stuf will also release the Turn A Gundam films in addition to the TV series.

On April 3, 2015, Right Stuf Inc. announced the remaining 25 episodes of the show would be released on August 4, 2015, via Blu-ray release.

== Reception ==
Mobile Suit Gundam 00 designer Yun Kōga cited Turn A when asked about her favorite series within the franchise.

The Turn A Gundam was chosen to be the 100th Master Grade model of Gunpla (abbreviation of Gundam Plastic Model) and at an earlier time, the first release of the Turn A Gundam DVD box set was announced. Two of the three Model Magazine in Japan, Hobby Japan and Dengeki Hobby was informed to build their own Turn A model using the old 1/100 kit for a display in the official announcement of the MS100 Turn A. Hobby Japan modeller Seira Masuo drastically redesigned the unit while Dengeki Hobby modeller went for the original approach of diorama. Both of the models was placed next to the MG100 draft design at the Bandai display forum at the announcement of MG100. Tomino addressed his little disappointment in the design of Turn A Gundam not having good reception, but he commented that it was happy to see that it was not pointless work as Turn A was selected as the 100th Master Grade model.

Turn A Gundam is also available on High Grade 1/144 scale and on Robot Spirit line. Turn X was released in Master Grade format in June 2014.

Preceded by Gundam Wing: Endless Waltz	Gundam metaseries (production order); 1999–2000	Succeeded by G-Saviour
