= Yamagata Television System =

JOYI-DTV
- Logo used since 2024

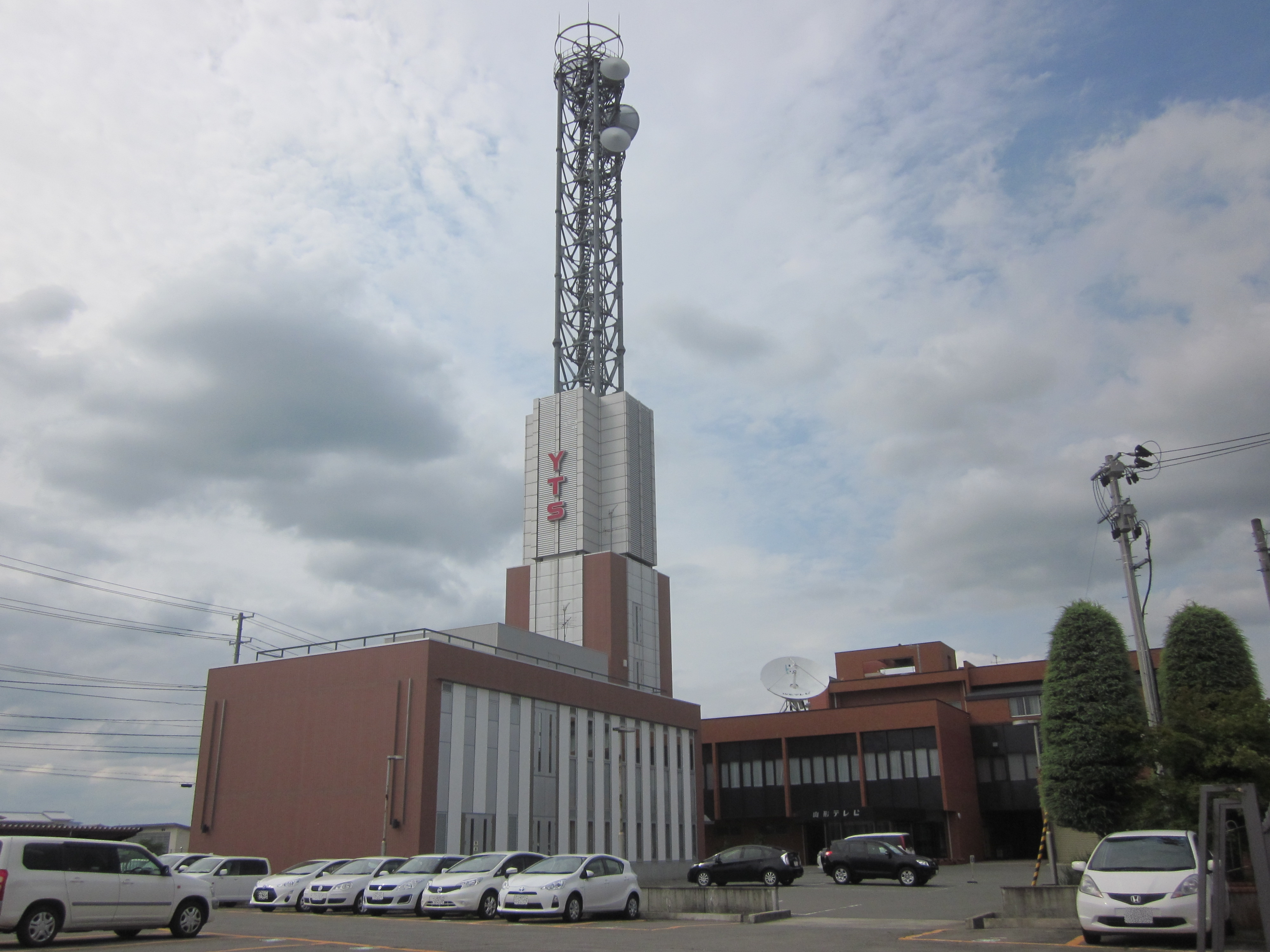
- Headquarters in Shironishima-chi, Yamagata
- Yamagata Prefecture; Japan
- City: Yamagata
- Channels: Digital: 18 (UHF); Virtual: 5
- Branding: YTS; Yamagata Television

Programming
- Language: Japanese
- Affiliations: All-Nippon News Network (since April 1, 1993)

Ownership
- Owner: Yamagata Television System, Inc.

History
- First air date: April 1, 1970
- Former call signs: JOYI-TV (1970–2011)
- Former channel numbers: Analog: 38 (UHF, 1970–2011)
- Former affiliations: FNN/FNS (April 1, 1970 – March 31, 1993)
- Call sign meaning: Yamagata TelevIsion

Technical information
- Licensing authority: MIC

Links
- Website: www.yts.co.jp

Corporate information
- Native name: 株式会社山形テレビ
- Romanized name: Kabushikigaisha Yamagataterebi
- Type: Kabushiki gaisha
- Industry: Television broadcasting
- Founded: December 27, 1968; 57 years ago
- Headquarters: 5-4-1 Shironishima-chi, Yamagata, Yamagata Prefecture, Japan
- Owner: TV Asahi Holdings Corporation (23.5%); The Asahi Shimbun (18.6%)
- Footnotes; Data from its Corporate Profile

Yamagata Television System, Inc. (株式会社山形テレビ, Kabushiki-gaisha Yamagata Terebi), also known as YTS, is a Japanese broadcast network affiliated with the All-Nippon News Network. Their headquarters are located in Yamagata Prefecture.

== History ==
Logo used from 1970 to 2024.

JOYI-TV (also known as YTS) signed on as the primary Fuji News Network and Fuji Network System affiliate for Yamagata Prefecture on 1 April 1970, and remained with that network for its first 23 years in operation. It carried several TBS programs in the program sales format with Yamagata Broadcasting (YBC) until October 1989, when TV-U Yamagata (TUY) began broadcasting as the prefecture's JNN affiliate.

In September 1992, YTS announced that it would affiliate with the All-Nippon News Network (ANN) and carry programming from TV Asahi once its affiliation contract with Fuji Television expired on March 31st of the following year. Prior to the affiliation switch (which occurred on 1 April 1993), YBC, YTS, and TUY all carried several programs from TV Asahi under the program sales method. Conversely, this left Yamagata Prefecture without a full FNN/FNS affiliate for four years until Sakuranbo Television signed on as the new FNN/FNS affiliate on 1 April 1997. In the interim, Sendai Television (from Sendai, which served eastern portions of Yamagata) served as the network's default over-the-air affiliate and that station, Akita Television from (Akita), and Fukushima Television (from Fukushima) were carried by regional cable television providers.

YTS began broadcasting in digital on 1 June 2006. The station's broadcasting area was affected by the 11 March 2011 earthquake, but received minimal damage compared to the devastation seen in the eastern areas of Tōhoku. Due to these circumstances, YTS officially terminated its analog television service as originally scheduled on 24 July 2011.
