= Hiroshima Telecasting =

Hiroshima Television Corporation

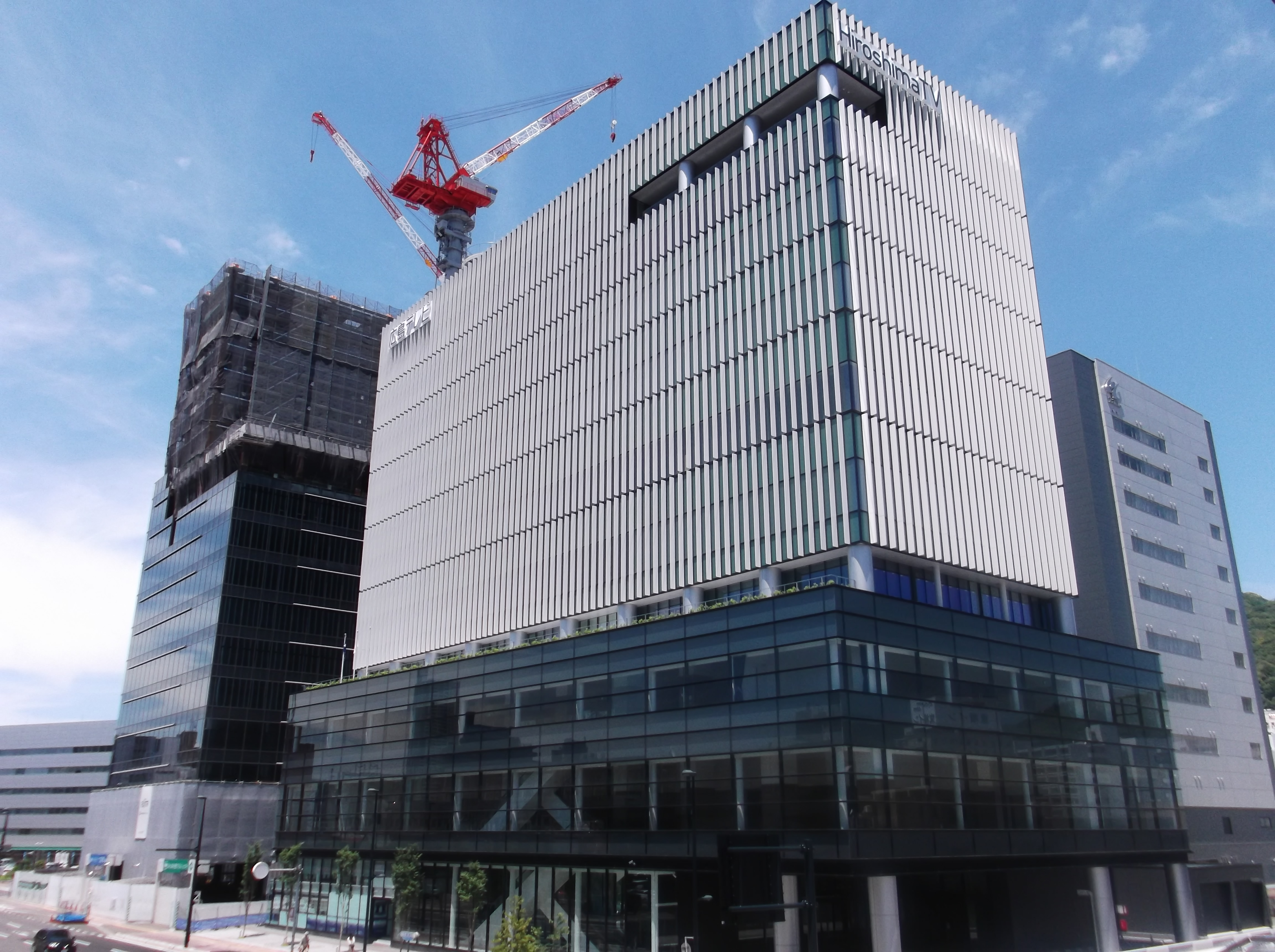
- Trade name: HTV; Hiroshima TV; Hirotele
- Native name: 広島テレビ放送株式会社
- Romanized name: Hiroshimaterebihōsō kabushikigaisha
- Formerly: Hiroshima Telecasting Co., Ltd. (1962-2015)
- Company type: Private KK
- Industry: Television broadcasting
- Founded: September 1, 1962; 63 years ago
- Website: www.htv.jp

JONX-DTV
- Logo used since 2005
- Hiroshima Prefecture; Japan
- City: Hiroshima
- Channels: Digital: 19 (UHF); Virtual: 4
- Branding: Hiroshima TV; HTV; Hirotele

Programming
- Language: Japanese
- Affiliations: Nippon News Network and Nippon Television Network System

Ownership
- Owner: Hiroshima Television Corporation

History
- First air date: September 1, 1962
- Former call signs: JONX-TV (1962–2011)
- Former channel numbers: 12 (analog VHF, 1962–2011)
- Former affiliations: Fuji TV/FNN/FNS (joint primary; 1962–1975); NET (secondary; 1962–1970)

Technical information
- Licensing authority: MIC

Links
- Website: HTV

JONX-DTV (channel 4) is a Japanese television station that serves as the affiliate of the dual Nippon News Network and Nippon Television Network System for the Hiroshima Prefecture. The station is owned-and-operated by the Hiroshima Television Corporation (Note: 広島テレビ放送株式会社) and its studios are based in the Higashi-ku ward of Hiroshima.

== Capital composition ==
Information as of March 31, 2021:：

Capital	Total number of shares issued	Number of shareholders
200,000,000 yen	400,000 stocks	29

Shareholders	Number of shares held	Proportion
Nippon Television Holdings	96,000 shares	24.00%
Yomiuri Shimbun	75,800 shares	18.95%
Nippon Television Kobato Cultural Corporation	20,000 shares	5.00%
Hiroaki Kobayashi	13,400 shares	3.35%
Tomoko Hayashi	13,300 shares	3.33%

== History ==
Hiroshima Telecasting was the second commercial television station in Hiroshima Prefecture. The founding shareholders' meeting was held on January 16, 1962. Construction of the headquarters building began on May 25 of the same year and was completed on August 26. When it was first established, Hiroshima Television was an affiliate of Nippon Television and Fuji Television. On August 29, Hiroshima TV launched a test signal.

At 11 a.m. on September 1, 1962, Hiroshima Television officially started broadcasting. In its first fiscal year, Hiroshima TV had a turnover of 435.22 million yen and a profit of 46.2 million yen. In 1963, Hiroshima Television established a labor union. In 1965, Hiroshima Television achieved its first production abroad and produced a documentary documenting immigrants from Hiroshima Prefecture who were active in foreign countries. In the same year, due to insufficient space caused by increased business volume, Hiroshima TV expanded its headquarters. On April 1, 1969, Hiroshima Television launched a new logo. On December 10 of the same year, the new Hiroshima Television Headquarters was completed. In this fiscal year, Hiroshima TV's turnover exceeded 1 billion yen for the first time, reaching 1.17739 billion yen; profit also reached 272.38 million yen. In fiscal year 1974, Hiroshima Television's turnover exceeded 2 billion yen, reaching 2.20318 billion yen; but its profit decreased slightly to 263.48 million yen.

Hiroshima Television began construction of the second-generation headquarters building on December 9, 1974, and completed it on November 12, 1976. With the launch of TV Shinhiroshima on October 1, 1975, Hiroshima Television withdrew from the Fuji Television Network and became a fully affiliated station of the Nippon Television Network. Hiroshima Television's turnover in fiscal year 1976 reached 4.36221 billion yen, nearly doubling within two years; however, due to intensified competition due to the launch of the new station, profits further decreased to 112.78 million yen. On December 1, 1979, Hiroshima Television began broadcasting stereo programs. On January 1, 1982, in the year of the 20th anniversary of its launch, Hiroshima TV launched a new logo.

The new Hiroshima Television Station "Hirotele Plaza" (広テレプラザ) was completed and opened in 1992. From 1994 to 1998, Hiroshima TV won the triple crown in ratings for five consecutive years. Hiroshima Television began broadcasting digital television signals on October 1, 2006 and stopped broadcasting analog television signals on July 24, 2011. Hiroshima Television began construction of a new headquarters on the north side of Hiroshima Station in 2016 and moved into the new headquarters in 2018. The new headquarters building has 11 floors, of which the first to third floors are spaces open to the public. As of 2020, Hiroshima TV has won the triple crown in ratings for 8 consecutive years. In 2021, Hiroshima TV also won the quadruple crown in ratings.
