= Ishikawa TV =

JOIH-DTV
- Logo used since 2012

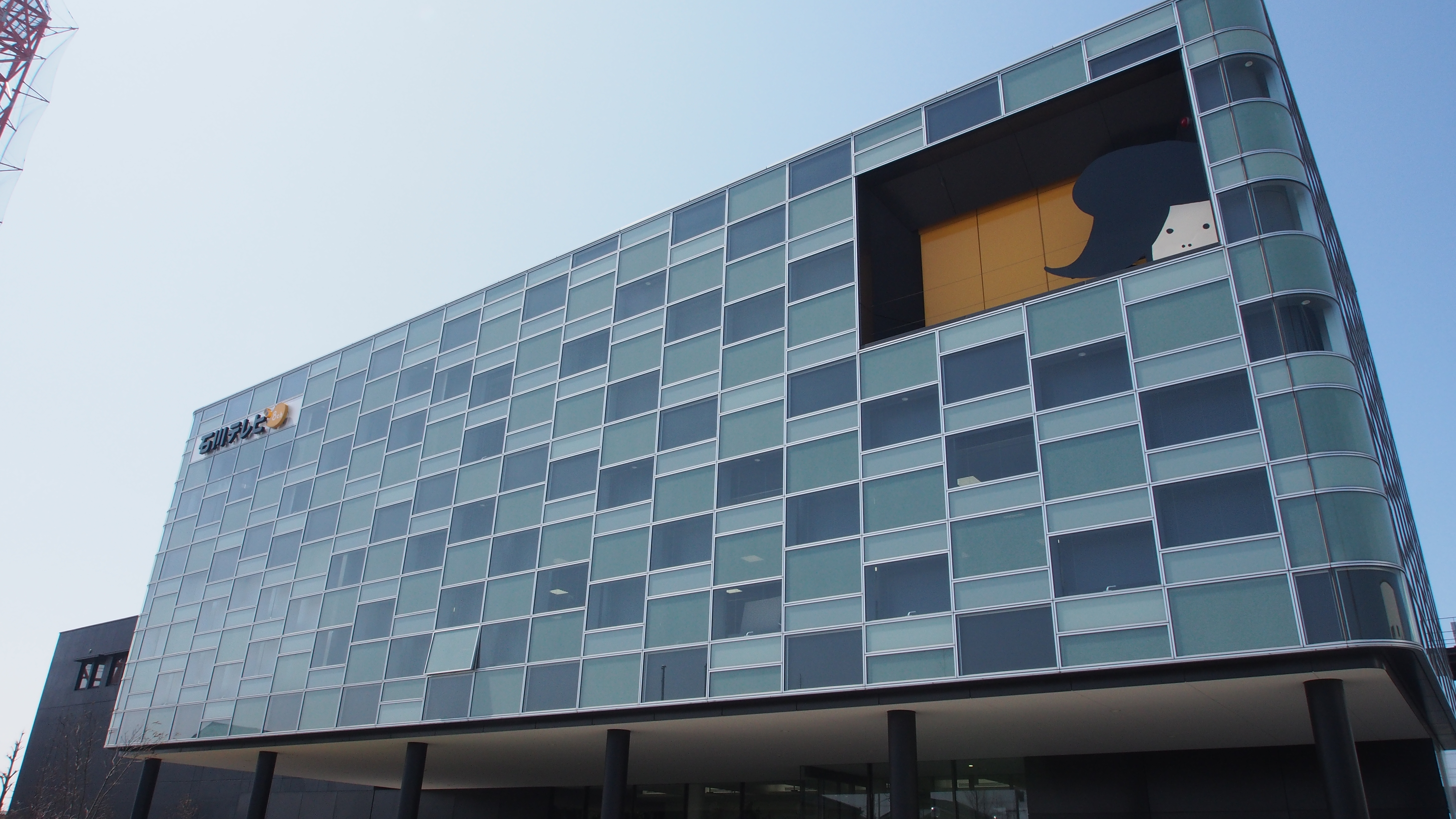
- Headquarters in Kannondomachi, Kanazawa
- Ishikawa Prefecture; Japan
- City: Kanazawa
- Channels: Digital: 16 (UHF); Virtual: 8
- Branding: Ishikawa TV 石テレ

Programming
- Language: Japanese
- Affiliations: Fuji News Network and Fuji Network System

Ownership
- Owner: Ishikawa Television Broadcasting Co, Ltd.

History
- Founded: March 7, 1968
- First air date: April 1, 1969
- Former call signs: JOIH-TV (1969–2011)
- Former channel numbers: Analog: 37 (UHF, 1969–2011)
- Call sign meaning: Ishikawa Terebi Housou

Technical information
- Licensing authority: MIC

Links
- Website: www.ishikawa-tv.com

Ishikawa Television Broadcasting Co., Ltd. (石川テレビ放送株式会社, Ishikawa Terebi Hōsō Kabushiki Gaisha), also known as ITC, is a Japanese broadcast network affiliated with the Fuji News Network and Fuji Network System. Their headquarters are located in Ishikawa Prefecture.

== History ==
- 1969 April: It was set up as Ishikawa Prefecture's second broadcasting station.
- 2006 July: its Digital terrestrial television broadcasts were started from its Kanazawa main station.
