= Okayama Broadcasting =

Television station in Okayama and Kagawa prefectures, Japan

Coordinates: 34°40′53″N 133°55′26″E

JOOH-DTV
- Logo used since 2014

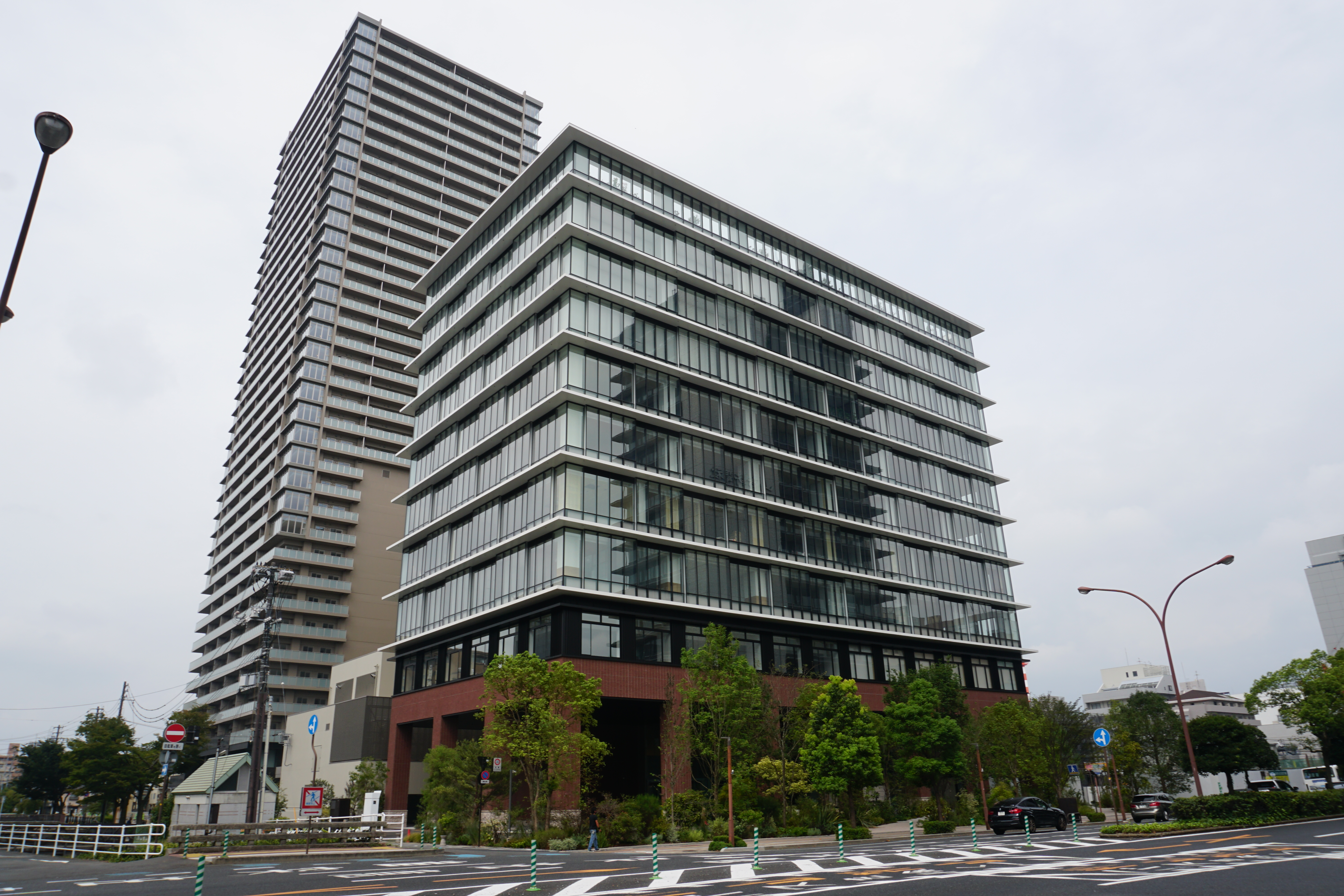
- Headquarters in Kita-ku, Okayama
- Okayama and Kagawa; Japan
- City: Okayama
- Channels: Digital: 27 (UHF); Virtual: 8
- Branding: Okayama Broadcasting; OHK

Programming
- Affiliations: Fuji News Network and Fuji Network System

Ownership
- Owner: Okayama Broadcasting Co., Ltd.

History
- First air date: April 1, 1969
- Former call signs: JOOH-TV (1969–2011)
- Former channel numbers: 35 (analog UHF, 1969–2011)
- Former affiliations: NET/ANN (secondary, 1969–1979)
- Call sign meaning: Okayama Housou (name of broadcaster)

Technical information
- Licensing authority: MIC

Links
- Website: www.ohk.co.jp

Okayama Broadcasting Co., Ltd. (岡山放送株式会社, Okayama Hōsō Kabushiki-gaisha; OHK) is a TV station broadcast in Okayama and Kagawa Prefectures. The abbreviation, OHK stands for Okayama Hoso K. K., the corporate name in romaji. It is a network affiliate of Fuji News Network (FNN) and Fuji Network System (FNS). The callsign is JOOH-TV.

== History ==
On November 1, 1967, OHK was founded to exploit a UHF frequency in Okayama, when the first tranche of UHF licenses was being granted across Japan. The company was founded on March 26, 1968.

Its broadcasts started on April 1, 1969 (as TV Okayama) as a primary FNN/FNS and secondary NET/ANN affiliate for the city of Okayama. KSB also began broadcasting on that same date as a primary NET/ANN affiliate for northern Kagawa Prefecture. On April 1, 1979, the Okayama and Kagawa television markets were merged with each other; OHK dropped its secondary affiliation with ANN as it was now able to serve both prefectures, because the two markets combined now had four commercial stations. To mark the occasion, as well as its tenth anniversary, a special program aired that day broadcast from four locations (Takamatsu Mitsukoshi, Takamatsu Port Pier, Uno Port Pier and the OHK studios).

The station began broadcasting in digital on December 1, 2006, and terminated its analog transmissions on July 24, 2011.
