= Niigata Sogo Television =

NST Niigata Sogo Television Co., Ltd.
- Logo used since 2002

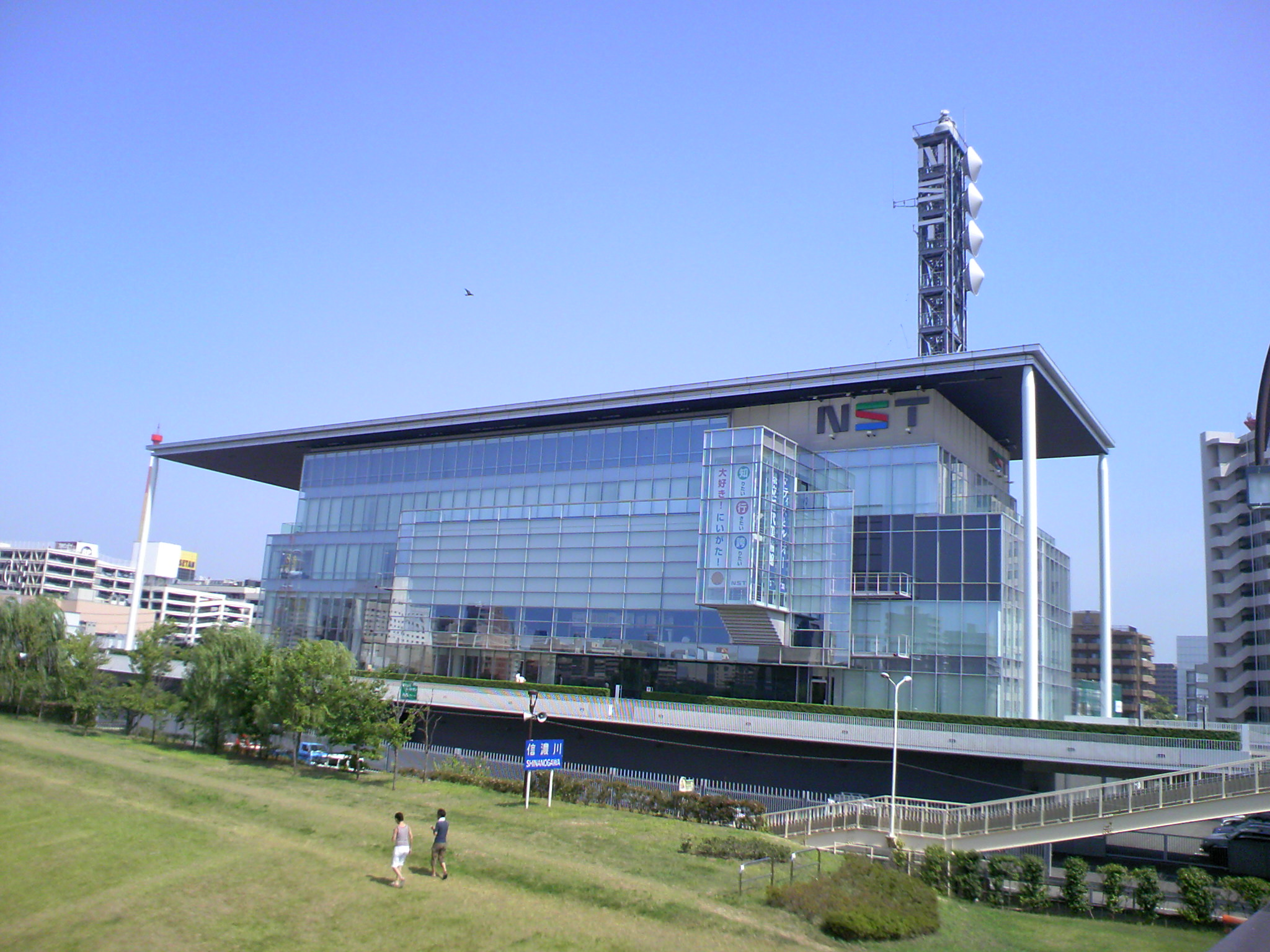
- Headquarters in Chūō-ku, Niigata
- Native name: 株式会社NST新潟総合テレビ
- Romanized name: Kabushikigaisha NST Niigata Sogo Television
- Formerly: Niigata Sogo Television Co., Ltd. (1968-2019)
- Type: Kabushiki kaisha
- Industry: Television network
- Founded: 2 March 1968; 58 years ago
- Headquarters: Yachiyo, Chūō-ku, Niigata, Japan
- Owner: Fuji Media Holdings (33.7%)
- Website: nsttv.com

JONH-DTV
- Niigata Prefecture; Japan
- City: Niigata
- Channels: Digital: 19 (UHF); Virtual: 8
- Branding: NST Niigata Sogo Television

Programming
- Language: Japanese
- Affiliations: Fuji News Network and Fuji Network System

Ownership
- Owner: NST Niigata Sogo Television Co., Ltd.

History
- First air date: 16 December 1968
- Former call signs: JONH-TV (1968–2011)
- Former channel numbers: 35 (analog UHF, 1968–2011)
- Former affiliations: NTV/NNN/NNS (secondary, 1968-1981); NET/ANN (secondary, 1968-1983)
- Call sign meaning: Niigata Hosou

Technical information
- Licensing authority: MIC

NST Niigata Sogo Television Inc. (株式会社NST新潟総合テレビ, Kabushikigaisha NST Niigata Sogo Television; NST) is a TV station affiliated with Fuji News Network (FNN) and Fuji Network System (FNS) in Niigata, Niigata. It is broadcast in Niigata Prefecture. It was established on March 2, 1968, and began broadcasting from December 16, 1968.

== History ==
Previous logo, used from 1968 until 2002

Niigata Sogo Television obtained its license on November 1, 1967, on the basis of the first UHF frequency plan, established on March 2, 1968 and started broadcasting on December 16 the same year. The station was the first to have three affiliations, with Fuji TV, NTV and NET, from which the term "Sogo" (General) was picked for the station. Up until the appearance of TeNY, the station wasn't referred in common jargon by its channel number (35) but as U, due to the fact that it was the only UHF station available at the time, the station also had frequent breaks in transmission in its early years.

In 1981, the station lost its affiliation with NNN/NNS when Television Niigata Network signed on. On 1 July, the station started multiplex audio broadcasting with the live broadcast of the Hanshin-Tigers baseball match from the Koshien Stadium produced by Asahi Broadcasting. After Niigata Television Network 21 signed on in October 1983, the station became a full-time FNN/FNS affiliate.

Its longtime president (who held the role since 1973), Tokichi Komagata, died on February 7, 1999, having retired from his position nearly two weeks earlier.

In April 2002, NST unveiled its current logo, replacing the wordmark used since its launch. The new wordmark is formed out of eight sticks, conveying the idea that "a stick is the most simple expression of humanity", while also conveying the short distance between the company and the viewer. Each of the three lines of the S have a meaning: Symbiosis (green) for nature and the environment; Passion (red) for love; Wisdom (blue) for water.

The station obtained its official digital terrestrial television license from the Ministry of Internal Affairs and Communications on March 30, 2006, starting digital broadcasts two days later.

The legal name of the company in Japanese was changed to include the NST initials in 2019.
