= Ehime Broadcasting =

Coordinates: 33°49′56.5″N 132°45′34.5″E

Ehime Broadcasting Co., Ltd.

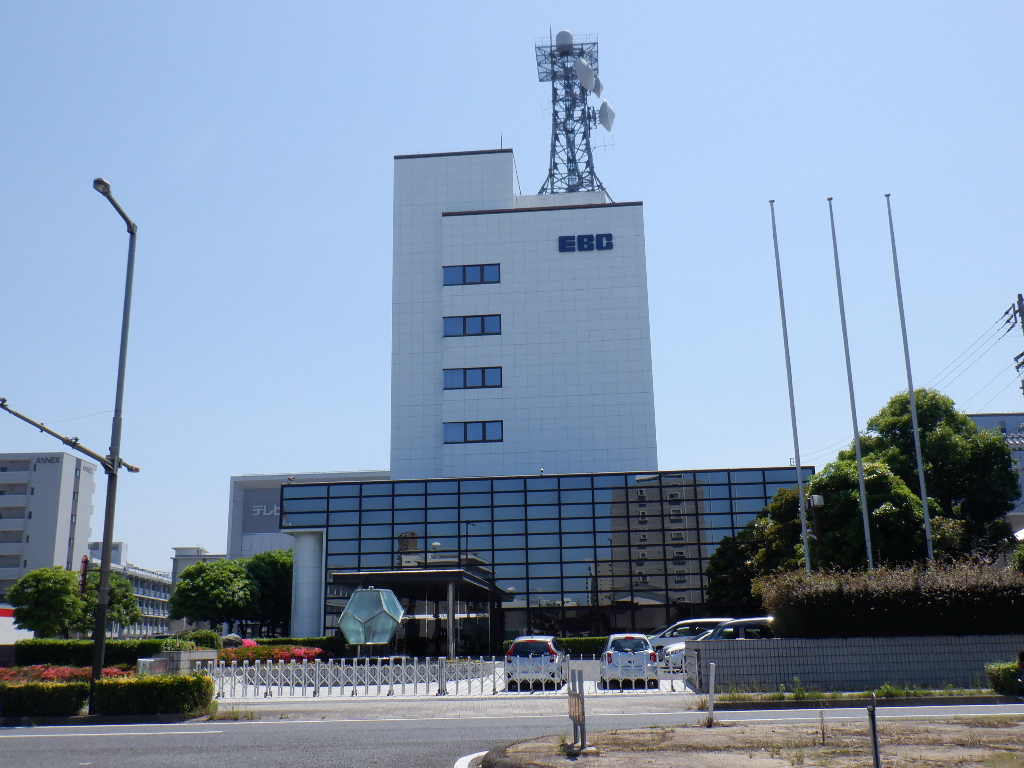
- Trade name: EBC
- Native name: 株式会社テレビ愛媛
- Romanized name: Kabushikigaisha terebiehime
- Company type: Kabushiki gaisha
- Founded: January 20, 1969; 57 years ago
- Headquarters: 110 Masago-cho, Matsuyama City, Ehime Prefecture, Japan
- Key people: Makio Otani (President and Representative Director)
- Number of employees: 72 (2023)
- Website: www.ebc.co.jp
- Footnotes / references Corporate information from its Corporate Profile

JOEI-DTV
- Ehime Prefecture; Japan
- City: Matsuyama
- Channels: Digital: 27 (UHF); Virtual: 8
- Branding: TV Ehime; EBC

Programming
- Language: Japanese
- Affiliations: Fuji News Network and Fuji Network System

Ownership
- Owner: Ehime Broadcasting Co., Ltd.

History
- First air date: December 10, 1969
- Former call signs: JOEI-TV (1969–2011)
- Former channel numbers: Analog: 37 (UHF, 1969–2011)
- Former affiliations: NET/ANN (secondary, 1969–1995)
- Call sign meaning: EhIme

Technical information
- Licensing authority: MIC

Ehime Broadcasting Co., Ltd. (株式会社テレビ愛媛, Kabushiki-gaisha Television Ehime), also known as EBC, is a Japanese broadcast network affiliated with the Fuji News Network and the Fuji Network System. Their headquarters are located in Matsuyama, Ehime Prefecture.

== History ==
In 1964, 14 companies applied for a broadcast license for the second commercial broadcaster in Ehime Prefecture. Among the applicants were Matsuyama Mainichi Broadcasting, Ehime Asahi Broadcasting (no relation with Ehime Asahi Television), Kitashikoku TV, Iyo TV, Matsuyama Sankei TV, Matsuyama TV, Ehime Utsumi TV and Matsuyama Yomiuri TV.In July 1968, these applications were later merged by the Prefectural Government which was later approved in October of the same year.On October 26, 1969, TV Ehime started trial broadcasts and followed by its first official broadcast on December 10 of the same year.

TV Ehime won its first Triple Crown Ratings in October 1976 with an average rating of 16% for all day and 29.9% for primetime.
