= Toyama Television =

JOTH-DTV
- Logo used since 1993

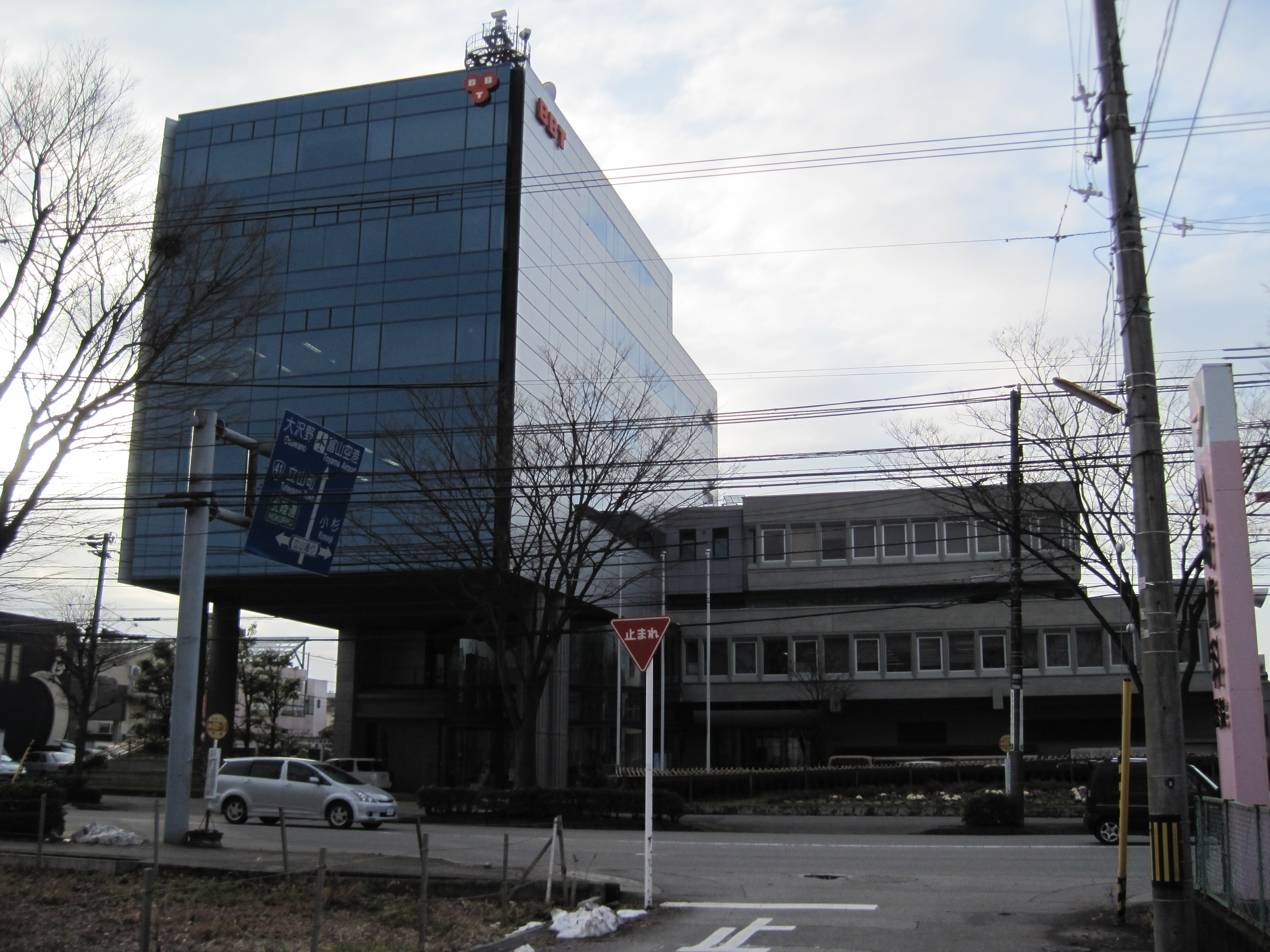
- Headquarters in Shinnezukamachi, Toyama
- Toyama Prefecture; Japan
- City: Toyama
- Channels: Digital: 18 (UHF); Virtual: 8
- Branding: BBT; Toyama Television

Programming
- Language: Japanese
- Affiliations: Fuji News Network and Fuji Network System

Ownership
- Owner: Toyama Television Broadcasting Co., Ltd.

History
- First air date: April 1, 1969
- Former call signs: JOTH-TV (1969–2011)
- Former channel numbers: Analog: 34 (UHF, 1969–2011)
- Call sign meaning: Toyama Terebi Hoso (legal name)

Technical information
- Licensing authority: MIC

Links
- Website: www.bbt.co.jp
- Company
- Native name: 富山テレビ放送株式会社
- Romanized name: Toyama Terebi Hōsō Kabushikigaisha
- Type: Business corporation
- Industry: Television network
- Founded: March 12, 1968
- Headquarters: 1-8-14 Shinnezukamachi, Toyama City, Toyama Prefecture, Japan
- Key people: Osamu Nakanishi (President and Representative Director)
- Number of employees: 94 (2020)
- Footnotes; Data from its Company Profile

JOTH-DTV (channel 8), branding as Toyama Television Broadcasting Co., Ltd. (富山テレビ放送株式会社, Toyama Terebi Hōsō Kabushikigaisha; BBT), is a TV station affiliated with Fuji News Network (FNN) and Fuji Network System (FNS) in Toyama, Toyama. It is broadcast in Toyama Prefecture. Established in 1969, the station was branded as T34 until December 31, 1993. On July 24, 2011, Toyama Television permanently ceased analog broadcast operations in favor of digital television.
