= Iwate Menkoi Television =

JOYH-DTV

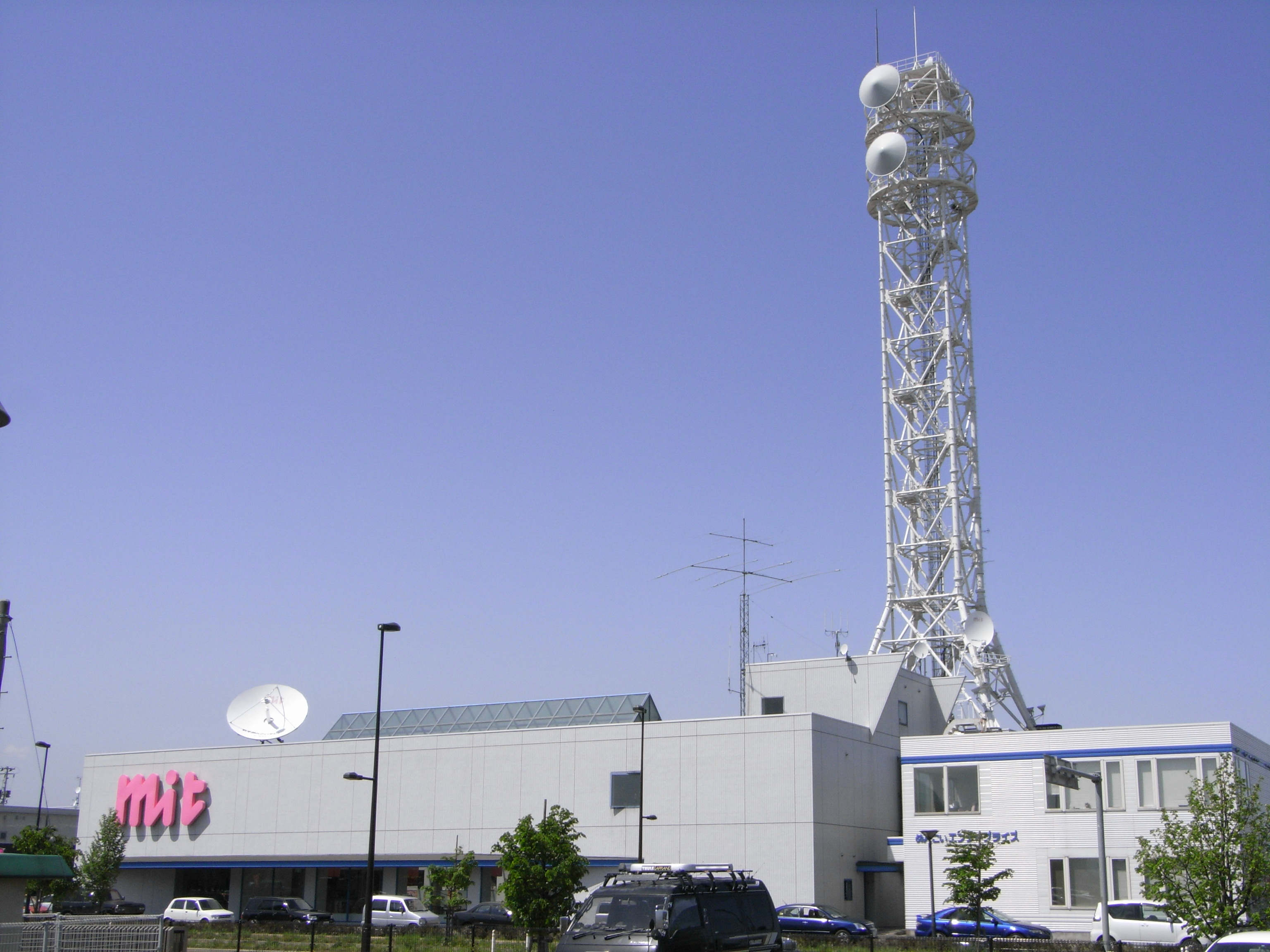
- Headquarters in Motomiya, Morioka
- Iwate Prefecture; Japan
- City: Morioka
- Channels: Digital: 20 (UHF); Virtual: 8
- Branding: Iwate Menkoi Television; Menkoi TV mit

Programming
- Language: Japanese
- Affiliations: Fuji News Network and Fuji Network System

Ownership
- Owner: Iwate Menkoi Television Co., Ltd.

History
- First air date: April 1, 1991
- Former call signs: JOYH-TV (1991–2012)
- Former channel numbers: Analog: 33 (UHF, 1991–2012)

Technical information
- Licensing authority: MIC

Links
- Website: menkoi-tv.co.jp
- Native name: 岩手めんこいテレビ株式会社
- Romanized name: Iwate Menkoi Terebi Kabushikigaisha
- Type: Private KK
- Industry: Television network
- Founded: 10 April 1990; 36 years ago
- Headquarters: Motomiya, Morioka, Iwate, Japan
- Owner: Fuji Media Holdings (32.7%)
- Subsidiaries: Menkoi Enterprise; Menkoi Media Brain; Olympia Planning

Iwate Menkoi Television Co., Ltd. (Japanese: 岩手めんこいテレビ株式会社, Hepburn: Iwate Menkoi Terebi Kabushikigaisha; mit) is a TV station affiliated with Fuji News Network (FNN) and Fuji Network System (FNS) in Morioka, Iwate.

The station functions as a default FNN affiliate for neighboring Aomori Prefecture, which does not have a Fuji Television-affiliated station of its own.

== History ==
JOYH-DTV began broadcasting on 1 April 1991 as JOYH-TV (channel 33), becoming the first dedicated affiliate of FNN (Fuji Television) in the northeastern portion of Tōhoku (the license had been awarded back in December 1989, but the station's construction began in the spring of 1990). Prior to the station's sign-on, some cable providers in Iwate Prefecture carried Sendai Television, which was receivable over the air in the prefecture's extreme southern reaches.

Digital broadcasting began on 1 July 2006, and was expected to continue until July 2011. The 11 March 2011 earthquake resulted in the postponement of the shutdown date for all analog television signals in Iwate, Miyagi, and Fukushima prefectures. The station finally shut down its analog television service on 31 March 2012.
