= Television Shin-Hiroshima =

JORM-DTV

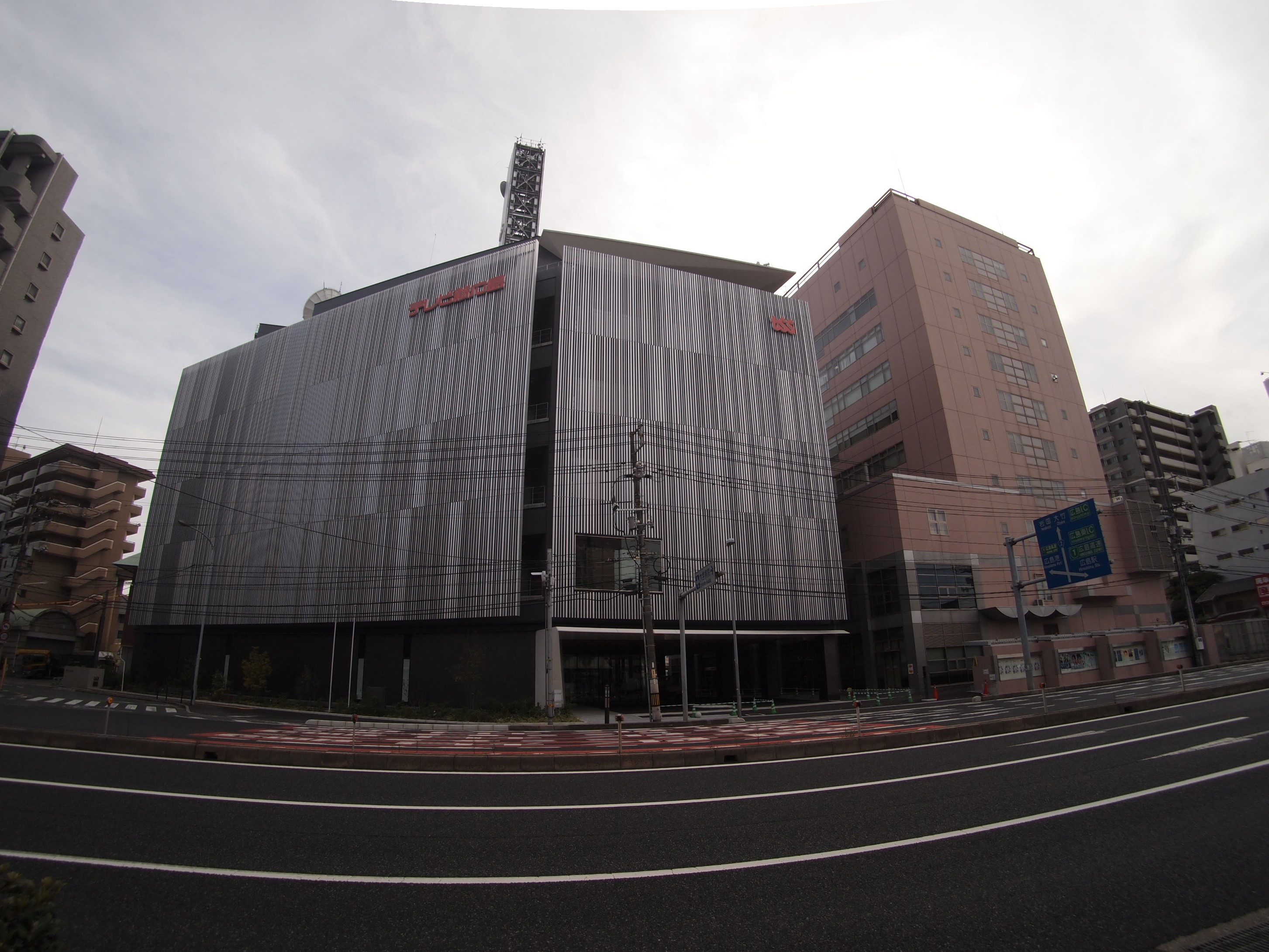
- Headquarters in Minami-ku, Hiroshima
- Hiroshima Prefecture; Japan
- City: Hiroshima
- Channels: Digital: 23 (UHF); Virtual: 8
- Branding: Television Shin-Hiroshima; TSS

Programming
- Language: Japanese
- Affiliations: Fuji News Network and Fuji Network System

Ownership
- Owner: TSS-TV Co., Ltd.

History
- Founded: August 8, 1974
- First air date: October 1, 1975
- Former call signs: JORM-TV (1975–2011)
- Former channel numbers: 31 (UHF analog, 1975–2011)
- Call sign meaning: Hiroshima

Technical information
- Licensing authority: MIC

Links
- Website: www.tss-tv.co.jp

Alternate logo used since 2025.

Television Shin-Hiroshima (テレビ新広島, Terebi shinhiroshima; TSS) is a Japanese television station, callsign JORM-DTV and transmitting on Japanese channel 8, that serves as an affiliate of the dual Fuji News Network (FNN) and Fuji Network System (FNS) in Hiroshima Prefecture, owned and operated by TSS-TV Co., Ltd. (Note: 株式会社テレビ新広島, Kabushiki-gaisha Terebi shinhiroshima; Previously known as Shinhiroshima Telecasting Co., Ltd. from 1974-2008) Based in Hiroshima, the station has its headquarters and studios in Deshio in the Minami-ku ward of Hiroshima.

TSS is also available through the Americable system at Marine Corps Air Station Iwakuni in eastern Yamaguchi Prefecture, near the border with Hiroshima Prefecture, as part of its free tier. Yamaguchi Prefecture does not have its own FNN/FNS station.

== History ==
Former alternative logo, used from 2000 to 2015.

TSS was founded on August 8, 1974, and began broadcasting on October 1, 1975. In addition to its main station in Hiroshima, its initial relay network included stations in Fukuyama, Onomichi, Fuchu, Kure, Ogaki, Takehara, Miyoshi, Sato, Mihara, Innoshima, Chiyoda, and Saijo.

On June 23, 2006, TSS began broadcasting a digital signal, and the analog-digital simulcast period continued until July 24, 2011. The station moved to its new headquarters in Deshio, Minami-ku, Hiroshima City, on February 22, 2021.
