= Kochi Sun Sun Broadcasting =

JOQX-DTV

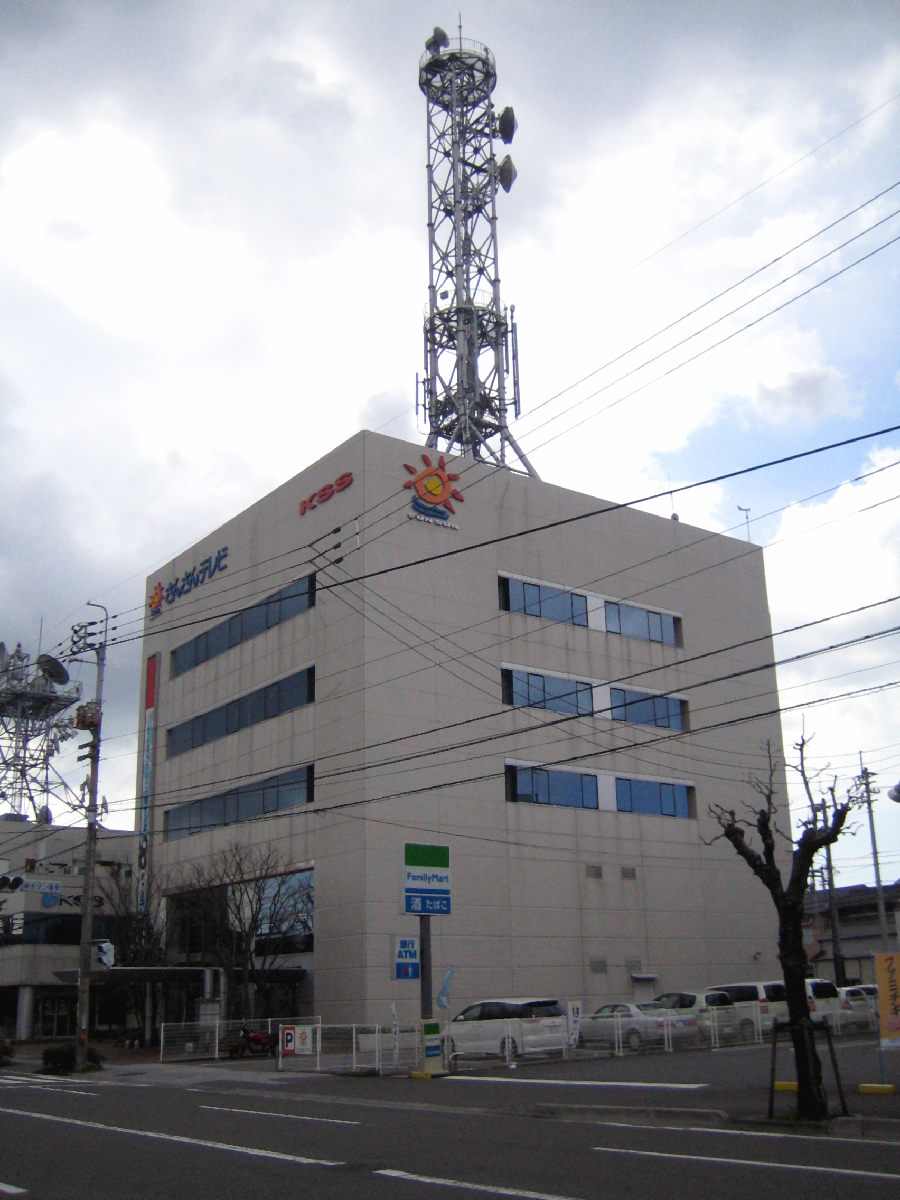
- Headquarters in Wakamatsucho, Kōchi

Kōchi Prefecture; Japan
- City: Kōchi
- Channels: Digital: 21 (UHF); Virtual: 8
- Branding: Kochi Sun Sun TV; KSS

Programming
- Language: Japanese
- Affiliations: Fuji News Network and Fuji Network System

Ownership
- Owner: Kochi Sun Sun Broadcasting, Inc.

History
- Founded: June 3, 1996
- First air date: April 1, 1997
- Former call signs: Analog: 40 (UHF, 1997-2011)
- Former channel number: JOQX-TV (1997-2011)

Technical information
- Licensing authority: MIC

Links
- Website: www.sunsuntv.co.jp

Kochi Sun Sun Broadcasting (高知さんさんテレビ, Kōchi Sansan Terebi), also known as KSS, is a television network headquartered in Kōchi City, Kōchi Prefecture, Japan. It is affiliated with FNN and FNS. Kochi Sun Sun Broadcasting is the third commercial television station in Kōchi. Former Kochi governor Daijiro Hashimoto played an important role for the establishment of Kochi Sun Sun Broadcasting. It was started broadcast in 1997. In 2006, KSS started digital television broadcasting.
