= Sakuranbo Television =

JOCY-DTV

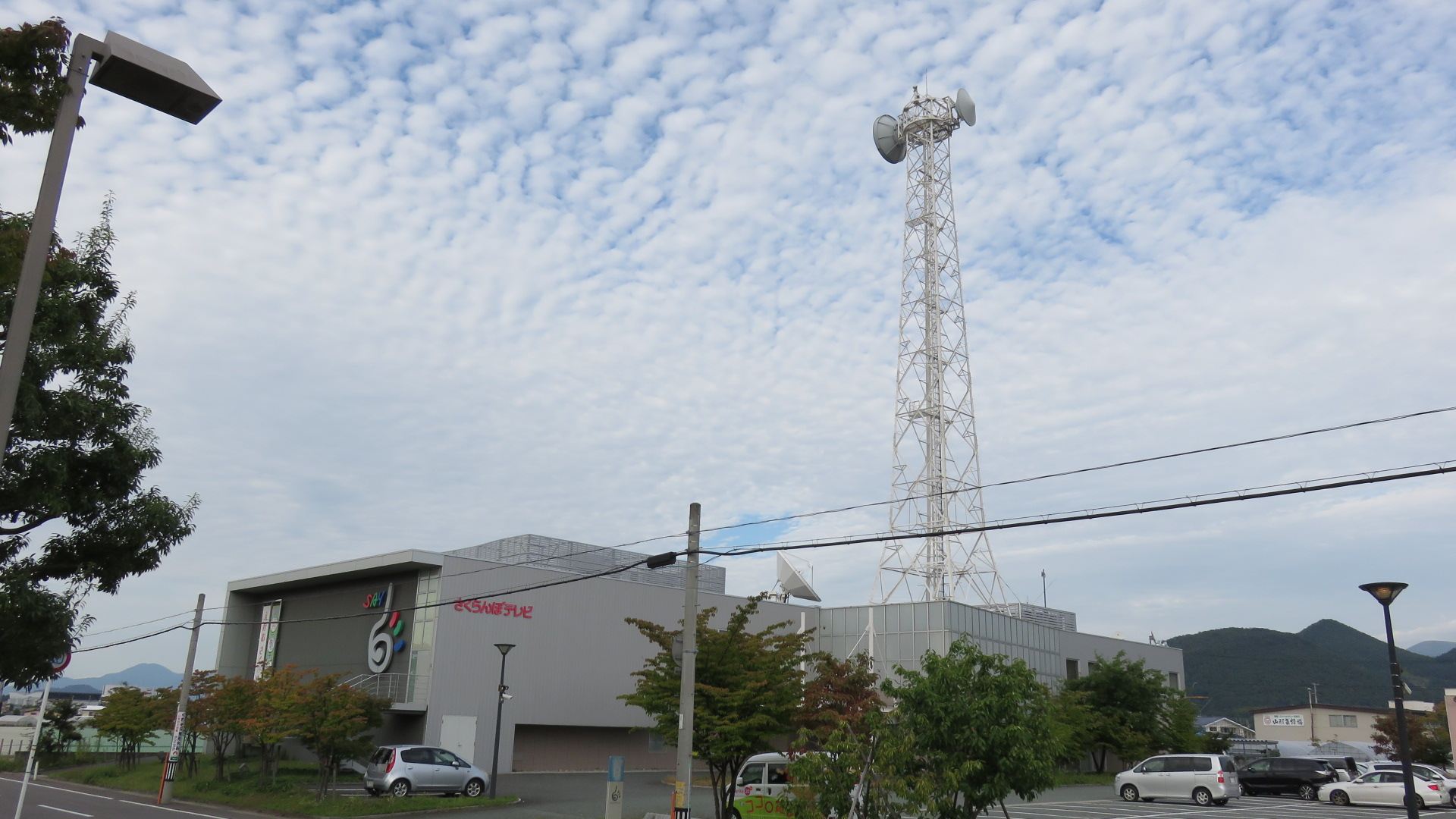
- Headquarters in Ochiaimachi, Yamagata
- Yamagata Prefecture; Japan
- City: Yamagata
- Channels: Digital: 22 (UHF); Virtual: 8
- Branding: Sakuranbo Television; SAY

Programming
- Language: Japanese
- Affiliations: Fuji News Network and Fuji Network System

Ownership
- Owner: Sakuranbo Television Broadcasting Corporation

History
- First air date: April 1, 1997
- Former call signs: JOCY-TV (1997-2011)
- Former channel numbers: Analog: 30 (UHF, 1997-2011)

Technical information
- Licensing authority: MIC

Links
- Website: https://www.sakuranbo.co.jp/

Sakuranbo Television Broadcasting Corporation (株式会社さくらんぼテレビジョン, Kabushiki-gaisha Sakuranbo Terebijon), also known as SAY, is a television network headquartered in Yamagata Prefecture, Japan. SAY is the fourth commercial television broadcaster in Yamagata Prefecture, it was started broadcasting in 1997.

Sakuranbo Television is affiliated with FNN and FNS. Yamagata Television System (YTS) was the affiliated station of FNN/FNS in Yamagata prefecture. In 1993, YTS shifted to All-Nippon News Network (ANN). As a relief measure, Fuji TV established Sakuranbo Television to broadcast its program in Yamagata prefecture.

In June 2006, Sakuranbo Television started broadcasting digital terrestrial television.
