= Sendai Television =

JOOX-DTV
- Logo used since 1992

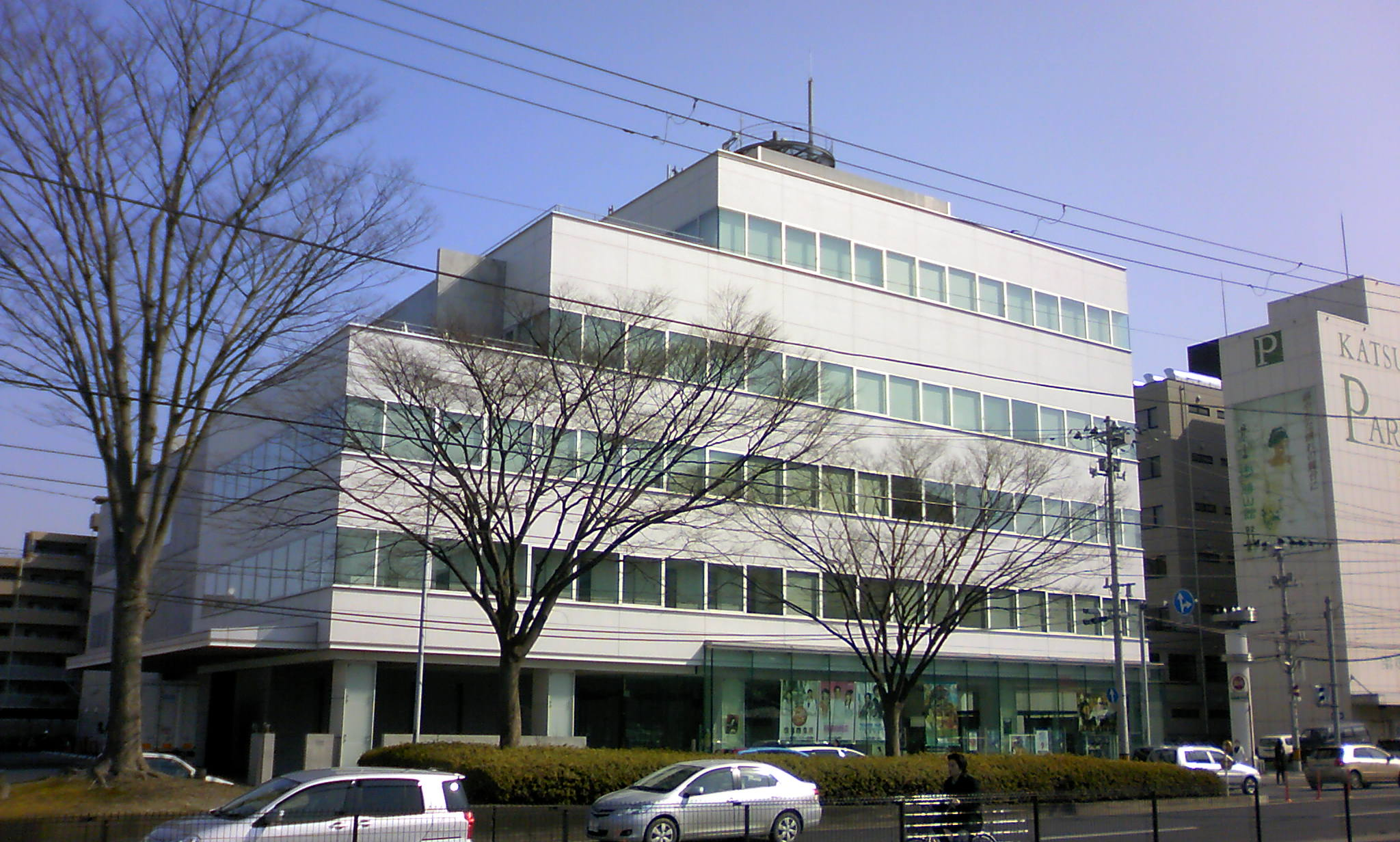
- Headquarters in Aoba-ku, Sendai
- Miyagi Prefecture; Japan
- City: Sendai
- Channels: Digital: 21 (UHF); Virtual: 8
- Branding: Sendai Television

Programming
- Language: Japanese
- Affiliations: Fuji News Network and Fuji Network System

Ownership
- Owner: Sendai Television Incorporated

History
- First air date: October 1, 1962
- Former call signs: JOOX-TV (1962–2012)
- Former channel numbers: Analog: 12 (VHF, 1962–2012)
- Former affiliations: All secondary: NTV/NNN (1962–1970); NET/ANN (1962–1975)

Technical information
- Licensing authority: MIC

Links
- Website: www.ox-tv.co.jp

Corporate information
- Company
- Native name: 株式会社仙台放送
- Romanized name: Kabushikigaisha sendaihōsō
- Type: Kabushiki gaisha
- Founded: October 1, 1961; 65 years ago
- Headquarters: 5-8-33 Uesugi, Aoba-ku, Sendai City, Miyagi Prefecture, Japan
- Owner: Fuji Media Holdings (72.4%)
- Footnotes; Data from its Corporate Profile

Sendai Television Inc. (株式会社仙台放送, Kabushiki-gaisha Sendai Hōsō; OX), callsign JOOX-DTV (channel 8) is a Japanese television station based in Sendai that serves as the affiliate of the Fuji News Network (FNN) and Fuji Network System (FNS) for the Miyagi Prefecture. It was established on October 1, 1962.

== Capital composition ==
Information as of March 31, 2021:：

Capital	Value per share	Total number of shares issued	Number of shareholders
200,000,000 yen	500 yen	400,000 stocks	7

Shareholders	Number of shares held	Proportion
Fuji Media Holdings	289,400 shares	72.35%

== History ==
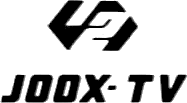
Former logo of Sendai Television, used from 1962 to 1992

In April 1962, 136,178 households in Miyagi Prefecture had TV sets, with a penetration rate of 39.6%. Against this background, Miyagi Prefecture residents are increasingly calling for the establishment of a second commercial TV station in the prefecture. On June 30, 1961, the Ministry of Posts and Telecommunications revised the first television channel plan, allowing the establishment of additional television stations in key local cities such as Sendai and Hiroshima. Sendai was therefore assigned channel 12. At this time, two operators, "Sendai TV" owned by Nippon Television and "Tohoku TV" owned by Fuji Television had applied to obtain the broadcasting license of Miyagi Prefecture's second commercial TV station.

In order to integrate resources, the Postal Ministry and local governments will be responsible for integrating competing players, which is the same as other regions in Japan. On July 12, 1961, Sendai TV and Tohoku TV formally agreed to merge their applications, and Tohoku TV was formed with 49% investment from Tohoku TV, 46% investment from Sendai TV, and 5% investment from the Miyagi Prefectural Government. On August 4, 1961, Tohoku TV was granted a preliminary license; on August 28 of the same year, Tohoku TV was renamed Sendai Broadcasting, and a founding general meeting was held on September 21, with the tentative headquarters being Shin-Sendai Building. Sendai Broadcasting purchased land on Danianji Mountain on November 1, 1961 to build a signal transmitting station. The signal transmission tower was completed in August of the following year, with a height of 147.3 meters. Before the launch of Sendai Television, it was decided that the new logo would be based on the channel number "12" and was designed by Yusaku Kamekura.

On September 13, 1962, Sendai Television launched a test signal and began trial broadcasting on the 24th of the same month. At 10:50 in the morning on October 1 of the same year, Sendai Television officially launched, becoming the second commercial TV station in Miyagi Prefecture. In the month of its launch, Sendai Broadcasting achieved sales of more than 60 million yen.

In the early days of broadcasting, Sendai Television was an affiliate of NTV and Fuji TV. In terms of time proportion, 63% of Sendai Television's initial broadcast time were Fuji TV programs, 23% were NTV programs, and only 14% of the time aired programs produced by other TV stations; the total weekly broadcast time reached 3,700 minutes. In 1963, Sendai Broadcasting expanded its headquarters to cope with the rising demand for program production. The following year, the Sendai Broadcasting Company's housing was completed, which greatly improved the residential environment for employees.

In 1965, Sendai Television signed a news gathering agreement with the Sankei Shimbun and the Yomiuri Shimbun, and opened an Ishinomaki branch the following year, significantly strengthening the news gathering system.

In October 1966, Sendai Television achieved monthly sales of more than 100 million yen.

On October 18, 1968, Sendai Television signed a sister station agreement with WGN-TV, an independent station in Chicago, and became its first overseas sister station.

On December 24, 1965, Sendai Television began broadcasting color television programs. With the launch of Miyagi Television, the third commercial television station in Miyagi Prefecture, on October 1, 1970, Sendai Broadcasting became a full-time FNN/FNS affiliate and no longer broadcast programs from NTV.

In order to expand revenue from businesses other than television, Sendai Television entered the residential exhibition field in 1972, the 10th anniversary of its launch. In the same year, the Tohoku Classic, a famous golf event in the Tohoku region, was also held.

From October 1975 to March 1976, Sendai Television won the prime-time ratings championship among all channels in Miyagi Prefecture for six consecutive months, and won the triple crown in ratings in January. In November 1977, Sendai Broadcasting set a record of ratings of 10.9% for the whole day, 22.3% for prime time, and 20.4% for evening time.

On October 15, 1977, the new headquarters of Sendai Television was completed. In the same year, Sendai Television introduced the electronic news gathering (ENG) system, which greatly improved the efficiency of news editing. During the 1978 Miyagi earthquake, Sendai Television was also severely affected. The transmission tower was bent due to the earthquake and had to be repaired; however, Sendai Television's report on the earthquake won the FNN Monthly Excellence Award.

Sendai Television moved to its current headquarters in 2004. From 2005 to 2009, Sendai Television won the triple crown in ratings for five consecutive years.

Sendai Television began broadcasting digital television on December 1, 2005. Affected by the 2011 Tohoku earthquake and tsunami, Sendai Television stopped broadcasting analog television on March 31, 2012, more than half a year behind other parts of Japan except the affected prefectures (Miyagi, Iwate, and Fukushima). Starting in December 2016, Sendai Broadcasting became a group subsidiary of Fuji Media Holdings.
