= Fuji News Network =

Japanese television network

- Above: FNN logo in use since 1966; Below: Alternative FNN logo used since 2018
- Type: Broadcast television network
- Country: Japan
- Founded: 3 October 1966
- Owner: Fuji Television Network, Inc.
- Official website: fnn.jp
- Language: Japanese

Fuji News Network (FNN) is a Japanese commercial television network run by Fuji Television Network, Inc. (Fuji TV), a subsidiary of Fuji Media Holdings and part of the Fujisankei Communications Group. The network's responsibility includes the syndication of national television news bulletins to its regional affiliates, and news exchange between the stations.

FNN also manages the free online service FNN Prime, visited by an average of 100 million views by month.

Distribution of non-news television programmes is handled by Fuji Network System (FNS), another network set up by Fuji TV.

== History ==
The network was formed on 3 October 1966 which comprised 7 television stations: Fuji TV (the flagship station), Sendai Television, Tōkai TV, Kansai TV, Hiroshima Telecasting (now affiliated with NNN and NNS), Nihonkai Telecasting, and Television Nishinippon Corporation.

Since 1 April 1997, the network has 26 full members, and two members that are affiliates of more than one network (Television Oita System and TV Miyazaki). In terms of the number of participating stations, it is the third largest in Japan, following NNN (NTN group) and JNN (TBS-group). FNS does not currently have any affiliates in four prefectures: Aomori, Yamanashi, Yamaguchi, and Tokushima.
