= Fuji Network System =

Japanese television network

- Type: Terrestrial television
- Country: Japan
- Affiliates: see List of FNN and FNS affiliates

Programming
- Language: Japanese
- Picture format: HDTV 1080i

Ownership
- Owner: Fuji Television
- Sister channels: Fuji News Network

History
- Launched: October 1, 1969; 56 years ago

Links
- Website: https://www.fuji-network.com

Fuji Network System (フジネットワーク, Fuji Nettowāku; FNS) is a Japanese television network operated by Fuji Television Network, Inc. (Fuji TV), a subsidiary of Fuji Media Holdings and part of the Fujisankei Communications Group. FNS distributes entertainment and other non-news television programmes to its 28 regional television stations.

Distribution of national television news bulletins is handled by Fuji News Network, another network set up by Fuji TV.

== History ==
Fuji Television, which opened in March 1959, signed an agreement on program exchange between four companies, Kansai Television Broadcasting, Tokai Television Broadcasting, and Kyushu Asahi Broadcasting in June of the same year (at the beginning of the agreement, Tokai TV and Kyushu Asahi Broadcasting were cross-net stations). In April 1962, Nagoya Television Broadcasting was opened, and Tokai TV moved to Fuji TV's full-net station. This has set the pace for network expansion. On October 10 of the same year, Fuji Television, Sapporo Television Broadcasting, Sendai Broadcasting, Tokai Television Broadcasting, Kansai Television Broadcasting, Hiroshima Television Broadcasting, Kyushu Asahi Broadcasting, Okinawa Television Broadcasting.[Note 1] A trunk line network connecting 8 companies (Sapporo TV, Sendai Broadcasting, Hiroshima TV, Kyushu Asahi Broadcasting is a cross-net station, and Okinawa TV is an open net station including NHK). The efficient trunk line network has a great effect in terms of performance, and Fuji TV is a latecomer, but it surpassed the preceding Japan TV, and was close to Radio Tokyo TV (currently: TBS TV).

In October 1964, Fuji TV became the president Nobutaka Shikauchi (later the first chairman of the Fuji Sankei Group) took advantage of the release of UHF to strongly promote the construction of a national network of Fuji TV affiliates. In April 1969, the FNS Secretariat was established within Fuji Television. In January 1970, the FNS rules were enacted, and in June, "Quarterly FNS" was launched. New UHF stations opened one after another throughout the country, and in 1971, the number of affiliated stations increased rapidly to 27, making it the largest network system for commercial broadcasting. In May of the same year, Fuji TV established a new "network station" within the company, and the first director was from the Ministry of Posts and PostsTakashi Yokota (later served as the chairman of TV Kumamoto). In April 1997, Sakuranbo Television and Kochi Sun Sun Broadcasting were opened, and the current system of 28 companies was completed.

=== Current Status ===
FNS has 28 companies (26 full net stations, 2 cross net stations. The core station consists of Fuji TV, Hokkaido Bunka Broadcasting, Sendai Broadcasting, TV Shizuoka, Tokai TV, Kansai TV, TV Shin Hiroshima, and TV West Japan. Each key station company broadcasts a national network special program produced in-house at least once a year in the special program frame at 16 o'clock on Sundays (excluding Fuji TV for variety).

All 28 affiliated stations, including the two cross-net stations mentioned above, are one of the regular member companies of AC Japan (formerly the Public Advertising Organization), and a total of more than 1,000 private companies and organizations, including 28 companies, use a little of the resources they have, and a scandal occurs at the key station Fuji TV, and natural disasters and severe disasters occur As an advertisement mainly in the event of a occurrence, the public advertisement of the organization is broadcast and developed through TV commercial messages.

The number of affiliated stations is NNN (Japan TV series), JNN (TBS series) is the third after it, and all affiliated stations are TV single stations. Many of the FNS affiliated stations are consolidated subsidiaries or affiliates of Fuji Media Holdings, From the time of openingFuji Sankei Group, Hankyu Hanshin Toho Group, Chunichi Shimbun, Hokkaido Shimbun, West Japan Shimbun has a close relationship with each company in terms of both human resources and capital.

Some programs that do not have net sponsors (especially local sales frames) may be non-net depending on the station. In addition, some programs (produced by local FNS member stations) that are not broadcast due to the convenience of each wide-area broadcasting station (especially Fuji TV-Kansai TV-Tokai TV) may be broadcast by a terrestrial independent television station in the area where the wide-area broadcasting station is located.
