= Super Hero Time =

Japanese television programming block

- Launched: September 28, 2003
- Country of origin: Japan
- Owner: TV Asahi; Toei Company
- Running time: Sunday mornings 7:30 to 8:30 JST (2003–2017); 9:00 to 10:00 JST (2017–present)

Super Hero Time (スーパーヒーロータイム, Sūpā Hīrō Taimu) is a programming block on the Japanese television network TV Asahi featuring new episodes of tokusatsu television series from Toei Company. From 2003 to 2026, the block aired episodes from Super Sentai and Kamen Rider by Shotaro Ishinomori. Both were produced by Toei; however, they did not air together until 2000 with Kyuukyuu Sentai GoGoFive (which was quickly replaced by Mirai Sentai Timeranger two weeks later), though at the time they were not acknowledged together.

In November 2025, it was announced that the Super Sentai series would go on hiatus and lend its initial timeslot in the block to another new IP from Toei called Project R.E.D., incorporating elements from Super Sentai and the Metal Hero series, among other shows from Toei.

Super Hero Time airs every Sunday morning, from 9:00 to 10:00 JST. The block is shown all over Japan via the All-Nippon News Network. Though, in other prefectures, one or both shows can be seen on other stations which are not affiliated with ANN.

== History ==
Starting in the late 1960s, the hour was originally meant for educational children's programs. Over the years, the hour began including henshin (transforming) hero programs after the success of Kamen Rider, NET (now TV Asahi) had decided that this time slot must including some henshin hero programs to attract more audiences, even some non-Toei produced products had received green lights, such as Toho's Warrior of Love, Rainbowman (愛の戦士レインボーマン, Ai no Senshi Reinbōman), which was aired on Friday evening at 19:30 to 20:00 JST. "TV Asahi will broadcast cool hero things on weekend" later became a common sense tradition for Japanese audiences in future decades.

On October 4, 1987, Toei's Choujinki Metalder was moved from a Monday evening 19:00 JST time slot to a Sunday morning 9:30 JST time slot, followed by a move of Kidou Keiji Jiban to 8:00 JST Sunday morning on April 2, 1989. Similarly, on April 6, 1997, Denji Sentai Megaranger was moved from a Friday evening 17:30 JST time slot to the Sunday morning 7:30 JST time slot, pairing it up with B-Robo Kabutack. Super Sentai would continue to air at 7:30 JST after the Metal Hero series ended and Moero!! Robocon aired in its slot on January 31, 1999, and was followed by the premiere of Kamen Rider Kuuga and on January 30, 2000, joining Kyuukyuu Sentai GoGoFive and later, Mirai Sentai Timeranger.

Although the Super Sentai and Kamen Rider shows aired side-by-side since 2000, the Super Hero Time branding did not begin until the Autumn 2003 broadcast season (known as SUPER Hero Time (SUPERヒーロータイム) until the 2005 broadcast season). As part of the block, actors from the programs often interact with each other to promote each other's shows, films, and perform skits. Satoru Akashi (Mitsuomi Takahashi) and Souji Tendou (Hiro Mizushima) talked about each other's universes, and Master Xia Fu (voiced by Ichirō Nagai) often showed up on the Den-Liner to talk with the Imagin and Ryotaro Nogami (Takeru Satoh) in cartoonish caricatures. The 2008 broadcast introduced new changes to the block, including scenes from the show's episode.

For the 2009 television season, Kamen Rider Decade only aired for 31 episodes, allowing for the broadcast of Kamen Rider W for a full 49-episode run. This introduced an offset of five months between the series premieres of the yearly Super Sentai Series (which typically premiered in mid-February) and Kamen Rider Series (which premiered in early September since then), instead of an approximate month-long offset that had existed before (Kamen Rider Series premiered in mid-January). This offset was shortened to four months after the finale of the 53 episode-long Kamen Rider Wizard, delaying the premiere of subsequent Kamen Rider Series to early October until the debut of Kamen Rider Build in early September, resulting in the increase of the offset to seven months. In 2019, this offset was reduced to six months with the premiere of Kishiryu Sentai Ryusoulger in March after its time slot was occupied by the four-week-long miniseries Super Sentai Strongest Battle.

The Super Hero Time block is part of the larger Nichi Asa Kids Time (ニチアサキッズタイム, Nichi Asa Kizzu Taimu; "Sunday Morning Kids Time") block. From October 2017 until June 2026, the block began at 8:30 JST with the airing of an ABC Television-produced shōjo anime animated by Toei Animation (currently the Pretty Cure series) and ended at 10:00 JST after the airing of the Super Sentai series; prior to April 2016, the block was two hours long, with a shōnen anime being aired before Super Sentai. All of the shows are properties of Bandai, who also sponsors the block. While Super Hero Time began airing with such anime in its inception, the "Nichi Asa Kids Time" branding did not begin until March 4, 2007.

On October 1, 2017, the block was moved to 9:00 JST, with the Kamen Rider series airing before the Super Sentai series. In 2020, production of new episodes for both Kamen Rider Zero-One and Mashin Sentai Kiramager was temporarily halted due to the impact of COVID-19 pandemic in Japan, including one of the Kiramager cast members being infected, with special episodes containing old, unreleased footage being aired in the block until June, when production resumed, following a series of health and safety compliances. The block's scheduling would be maintained until the finale of No.1 Sentai Gozyuger, bringing the Super Sentai franchise to a hiatus, after which Project R.E.D., a new tokusatsu series that features elements from the Metal Hero and Super Sentai franchises, would take over the 9:30 JST timeslot.

== Line-ups ==
=== Japan ===
==== 2003–2017 ====
Premiere date		7:30 JST Super Sentai	8:00 JST Kamen Rider
Year	Month	7:30 JST Super Sentai	8:00 JST Kamen Rider
2003	September	Bakuryū Sentai Abaranger	Kamen Rider 555
2004	January	Bakuryū Sentai Abaranger	Kamen Rider Blade
2004	February	Tokusou Sentai Dekaranger	Kamen Rider Blade
2005	January	Tokusou Sentai Dekaranger	Kamen Rider Hibiki
2005	February	Mahō Sentai Magiranger	Kamen Rider Hibiki
2006	January	Mahō Sentai Magiranger	Kamen Rider Kabuto
2006	February	GoGo Sentai Boukenger	Kamen Rider Kabuto
2007	January	GoGo Sentai Boukenger	Kamen Rider Den-O
2007	February	Juken Sentai Gekiranger	Kamen Rider Den-O
2008	January	Juken Sentai Gekiranger	Kamen Rider Kiva
2008	February	Engine Sentai Go-onger	Kamen Rider Kiva
2009	January	Engine Sentai Go-onger	Kamen Rider Decade
2009	February	Samurai Sentai Shinkenger	Kamen Rider Decade
2009	September	Samurai Sentai Shinkenger	Kamen Rider W
2010	February	Tensou Sentai Goseiger	Kamen Rider W
2010	September	Tensou Sentai Goseiger	Kamen Rider OOO
2011	February	Kaizoku Sentai Gokaiger	Kamen Rider OOO
2011	September	Kaizoku Sentai Gokaiger	Kamen Rider Fourze
2012	February	Tokumei Sentai Go-Busters	Kamen Rider Fourze
2012	September	Tokumei Sentai Go-Busters	Kamen Rider Wizard
2013	February	Zyuden Sentai Kyoryuger	Kamen Rider Wizard
2013	October	Zyuden Sentai Kyoryuger	Kamen Rider Gaim
2014	February	Ressha Sentai ToQger	Kamen Rider Gaim
2014	October	Ressha Sentai ToQger	Kamen Rider Drive
2015	February	Shuriken Sentai Ninninger	Kamen Rider Drive
2015	October	Shuriken Sentai Ninninger	Kamen Rider Ghost
2016	February	Doubutsu Sentai Zyuohger	Kamen Rider Ghost
2016	October	Doubutsu Sentai Zyuohger	Kamen Rider Ex-Aid
2017	February	Uchu Sentai Kyuranger	Kamen Rider Ex-Aid

==== 2017–2025 ====
Premiere date		9:00 JST Kamen Rider	9:30 JST Super Sentai
Year	Month	9:00 JST Kamen Rider	9:30 JST Super Sentai
2017	October	Kamen Rider Build	Uchu Sentai Kyuranger
2018	February	Kamen Rider Build	Kaitou Sentai Lupinranger VS; Keisatsu Sentai Patranger
2018	September	Kamen Rider Zi-O	Kaitou Sentai Lupinranger VS; Keisatsu Sentai Patranger
2019	February	Kamen Rider Zi-O	Super Sentai Strongest Battle
2019	March	Kamen Rider Zi-O	Kishiryu Sentai Ryusoulger
2019	September	Kamen Rider Zero-One	Kishiryu Sentai Ryusoulger
2020	March	Kamen Rider Zero-One	Mashin Sentai Kiramager
2020	September	Kamen Rider Saber	Mashin Sentai Kiramager
2021	March	Kamen Rider Saber	Kikai Sentai Zenkaiger
2021	September	Kamen Rider Revice	Kikai Sentai Zenkaiger
2022	March	Kamen Rider Revice	Avataro Sentai Donbrothers
2022	September	Kamen Rider Geats	Avataro Sentai Donbrothers
2023	March	Kamen Rider Geats	Ohsama Sentai King-Ohger
2023	September	Kamen Rider Gotchard	Ohsama Sentai King-Ohger
2024	March	Kamen Rider Gotchard	Bakuage Sentai Boonboomger
2024	September	Kamen Rider Gavv	Bakuage Sentai Boonboomger
2025	February	Kamen Rider Gavv	No.1 Sentai Gozyuger
2025	September	Kamen Rider ZEZTZ	No.1 Sentai Gozyuger

==== 2026–present ====
Premiere date		9:00 JST Kamen Rider	9:30 JST Project R.E.D.
Year	Month	9:00 JST Kamen Rider	9:30 JST Project R.E.D.
2026	February	Kamen Rider ZEZTZ	Super Space Sheriff Gavan Infinity
2026	July	Kamen Rider ZEZTZ	Kakusei Hunter Omegahorn
2026	September	Kamen Rider MY-TH	Kakusei Hunter Omegahorn

== Coverage area ==
This block has been shown on TV Asahi (Tokyo), Mētele (Nagoya), ABC (Osaka) and all other stations of the All-Nippon News Network (Nationwide) via satellite. In other parts of the country, some stations not affiliated with ANN are showing either one or both shows.

Yamanashi

- Yamanashi Broadcasting System (YBS) (affiliated with the Nippon News Network, owned by Nippon TV) - Super Sentai / Project R.E.D.
- UHF Television Yamanashi (UTY) (affiliated with the Japan News Network, owned by TBS) - Kamen Rider

Toyama

- Kitanihon Broadcasting (KNB) (affiliated with the Nippon News Network, owned by Nippon TV) - Super Sentai / Project R.E.D. & Kamen Rider (formerly)
- Tulip Television (TUT) (affiliated with the Japan News Network, owned by TBS) - Kamen Rider (until Blade)

Fukui

- Fukui Broadcasting Corporation (FBC) (affiliated with both NNN and ANN) - Kamen Rider
- Fukui Television Broadcasting (FTB) (affiliated with the Fuji News Network, owned by Fuji Television) - Super Sentai / Project R.E.D.

Shimane / Tottori

- Broadcasting System of San-in (BSS) (affiliated with the Japan News Network, owned by TBS) - Kamen Rider
- San-in Chūō Television Broadcasting (TSK) (affiliated with the Fuji News Network, owned by Fuji Television) - Super Sentai / Project R.E.D.

Tokushima

- Shikoku Broadcasting (JRT) (affiliated with the Nippon News Network, owned by Nippon TV) - Super Sentai / Project R.E.D. & Kamen Rider

Kōchi

- TV Kochi (KUTV) (affiliated with the Japan News Network, owned by TBS) - Super Sentai / Project R.E.D. & Kamen Rider (formerly)

Miyazaki

- Miyazaki Broadcasting (MRT) (affiliated with the Japan News Network, owned by TBS) - Super Sentai / Project R.E.D. & Kamen Rider
