= The Shiunji Family Children =

Japanese manga series

- First tankōbon volume cover, featuring Seiha, Kotono, Banri, Shion (back), Arata, Ouka, and Minami Shiunji (front)

紫雲寺家の子供たち (Shiunji-ke no Kodomo-tachi)
- Genre: Romantic comedy
- Manga
- Written by: Reiji Miyajima
- Published by: Hakusensha
- English publisher: NA: Yen Press
- Imprint: Young Animal Comics
- Magazine: Young Animal
- Original run: February 25, 2022 – present
- Volumes: 11
- Anime television series
- Directed by: Ryouki Kamitsubo
- Produced by: Iku Nemoto; Eri Takeda; Aya Iizuka; Hideya Inoue; Shingo Saitou; Ryuutarou Shirakura; Takuji Wada
- Written by: Noboru Kimura
- Music by: Akki; Ginnojo Hoshi; Shota Horie
- Studio: Doga Kobo
- Licensed by: Crunchyroll; SEA: Medialink
- Original network: AT-X, Tokyo MX, BS11, KTV, NBS, UTY, itv, TV Shizuoka, TSS, HTB, Miyatere, NIB, IBC, Mētele, NKT, RKB, RBC, Tulip-TV, FTB, TUY, KKB
- Original run: April 8, 2025 – June 24, 2025
- Episodes: 12
- icon

The Shiunji Family Children (Japanese: 紫雲寺家の子供たち, Hepburn: Shiunji-ke no Kodomo-tachi) is a Japanese manga series written and illustrated by Reiji Miyajima. It has been serialized in Hakusensha's seinen manga magazine Young Animal since February 2022. Set in Tokyo's Seijō neighborhood, located in Setagaya Ward, the series follows a young boy who has never had a girlfriend. He lives with five sisters and a younger brother until his father reveals that he and his siblings are not biologically related.

An anime television series adaptation produced by Doga Kobo aired from April to June 2025.

== Plot ==
Arata Shiunji is a young man who lives with his five sisters and a younger brother. Due to him never having a girlfriend, it appears he will still remain single for the foreseeable future. One day, however, his father reveals a shocking secret to the family: he and his siblings are not blood relatives. Arata now finds himself dealing with an unexpected situation thanks to this revelation.

== Characters ==
Arata Shiunji (紫雲寺 新, Shiunji Arata)
Voiced by: Yūichirō Umehara, Minami Hinata^{Ep. 3 credits} (young) (Japanese); Abi Kumar (English)
The eldest son of the Shiunji family. He is the same age as Ouka and is her twin. He aims to maintain the sibling dynamic in the family, even after the revelation that they are not related to each other.
Banri Shiunji (紫雲寺 万里, Shiunji Banri)
Voiced by: Chika Anzai (Japanese); Taylor Murphy (English)
The eldest daughter of the Shiunji family and a university student. She is aiming to become a nurse and is well-liked due to her kind personality. She has a fear of ghosts and the supernatural.
Seiha Shiunji (紫雲寺 清葉, Shiunji Seiha)
Voiced by: Marika Kōno (Japanese); Amber May (English)
The second eldest sibling of the Shiunji family. Gifted with intelligence, she is the top-ranked student at school and is the valedictorian of her class.
Ouka Shiunji (紫雲寺 謳華, Shiunji Ōka)
Voiced by: Rie Takahashi (Japanese); Rebecca Danae (English)
The third oldest sibling of the Shiunji family and Arata's "twin" who is outgoing and popular, though this is later revealed to be a facade that hides her more fragile true self, and inner struggles.
Minami Shiunji (紫雲寺 南, Shiunji Minami)
Voiced by: Hana Hishikawa (Japanese); Morgan Berry (English)
Shion's biological twin sister who is very athletic and is a tennis champion, even being tipped to be a future Olympian. She has a fan club at school that consists mostly of girls.
Kotono Shiunji (紫雲寺 ことの, Shiunji Kotono)
Voiced by: Kana Ichinose (Japanese); Terri Doty (English)
The youngest sibling of the Shiunji family and a middle schooler. She has feelings for Arata despite having been rejected in the past, which have only grown since the revelation that they are not related by blood.
Shion Shiunji (紫雲寺 志苑, Shiunji Shion)
Voiced by: Chiaki Kobayashi (Japanese); Dallas Reid (English)
The only other son of the Shiunji family and Minami's biological twin. He regularly wears a beanie and often gives advice to Arata.
Kaname Shiunji (紫雲寺 要, Shiunji Kaname)
Voiced by: Masaki Terasoma (Japanese); Cris George (English)
The adoptive father of the Shiunji siblings who suddenly reveals to them that they are all not blood-related on Kotono's 15th birthday. Despite this, he is shown to love and care for his children very much.

== Media ==
=== Manga ===
Written and illustrated by Reiji Miyajima, The Shiunji Family Children started in Hakusensha's seinen manga magazine Young Animal on February 25, 2022. Hakusensha has collected its chapters into individual tankōbon volumes. The first volume was released on July 15, 2022. As of November 17, 2026, eleven volumes have been released.

The manga has been licensed for English release in North America by Yen Press.

==== Volumes ====
| No. | Original release date | Original ISBN | English release date | English ISBN |
|---|---|---|---|---|
| 1 | July 15, 2022 | 978-4-592-16701-3 | November 21, 2023 | 978-1-9753-7141-8 |
1. "The Shiunji Family Secret" (紫雲寺家の秘密, Shiunji-ka no Himitsu); 2. "Changes Among Siblings" (兄弟(きょう)姉(だい)妹の変化, Keiteishimai no Henka); 3. "The Fifth Daughter's Feelings" (五女の想い, Go On'na no Omoi); 4. "The Second Daughter's Expectations" (次女の思惑, Jijo no Omowaku); 5. "The Fourth Daughter's Troubles" (四女の苦悩, Shi On'na no Kunō); 6. "The First Daughter's Plea" (長女の願い, Chōjo no Negai); 7. "The Third Daughter's Confession" (三女の告白, Sanjo no Kokuhaku)
| 2 | July 14, 2023 | 978-4-592-16702-0; 978-4-592-16803-4 (SE) | September 17, 2024 | 978-1-9753-9138-6 |
8. "Like Family" (紫人として, Hitotoshite); 9. "Training Minami" (トレーニング南, Torēningu Minami); 10. "Smartphone Banri" (スマホ万里, Sumaho Banri); 11. "Twister Seiha" (ツイスター清葉, Tsuisutā Seiha); 12. "Splat-Ouka" (すぷら謳華, Supura Ōka); 13. "Special Someone" (いいひと, Ii Hito)
| 3 | February 16, 2024 | 978-4-592-16703-7 | February 18, 2025 | 979-8-8554-0884-3 |
14. "Trainer Arata" (新トレーナー, Arata Torēnā); 15. "One Win for Her" (私の一勝, Watashi no Ichikatsu); 16. "Score: Minami-Love" (南-0(ラブ), Minami-Rabu); 17. "Minami, the Fourth Daughter" (四女·南, Shi On'na Minami); 18. "Mother's Day" (母の日, Haha no Hi); 19. "I Want to Be Stronger" (強くなりたい, Tsuyoku Naritai); 20. "August 4th" (8月4日, Hachigatsu Yokka)
| 4 | July 17, 2024 | 978-4-592-16704-4 | May 27, 2025 | 979-8-8554-1513-1 |
21. "I Don't Love Him" (好きじゃない, Suki Janai); 22. "The Memento" (形見, Katami); 23. "What I Want to See" (見たいもの, Mitai Mono); 24. "Real Siblings" (本当の兄妹, Hontō no Kyōdai); 25. "Why I Came to See You" (会いにくるわけ, Ai ni Kuru Wake); 26. "I Can't Tell Everyone" (皆に言えない, Mina ni Ienai); 27. "The One I Love" (好きな人, Sukinahito)
| 5 | October 17, 2024 | 978-4-592-16705-1 | February 24, 2026 | 979-8-8554-2219-1 |
28. "Not Even One Time Outta Ten" (10も無い, Jū mo Nai); 29. "For a Long Time" (ずっと前から, Zutto mae Kara); 30. "Your Ideal Bride" (理想のお嫁さん, Risō no o Yomesan); 31. "Seen Them a Million Times" (何度も見てきた, Nando mo Mitekita); 32. "If I Said 'I Love You'" ("好き"って言ったら, "Suki" tte Ittara); 33. "If He Wasn't My Brother" (兄じゃなければ, Ani ja Nakereba); 34. "True Siblings" (本当の"きょうだい", Hontō no "Kyōdai")
| 6 | March 14, 2025 | 978-4-592-16706-8 | July 28, 2026 | 979-8-8554-2750-9 |
35. "That Kind of Relationship" (そんな仲, Sonna Naka); 36. "Different from Usual" (いつもと違う, Itsumo to Chigau); 37. "A Bit of Foul Play" (ズルくても, Zuru Kutemo); 38. "I Was First" (一番なのに, Ichiban Nanoni); 39. "Even with All That..." (それでも私は, Soredemo Watashi wa); 40. "Pajama War" (パジャマ戦争, Pajama Sensō); 41. "As Girls" (女性として, Josei to Shite)
| 7 | May 29, 2025 | 978-4-592-16707-5 | November 24, 2026 | 979-8-8554-3960-1 |
42. Tamatama Desu yo (たまたまですよ); 43. "Tsura-sa" to "Koi" ("つらさ"と"恋"); 44. Hakuba no Kishi (白馬の騎士); 45. Ima Kono Shunkan (今この瞬間); 46. Shisutāzu o Warau no wa (妹達を笑うのは); 47. Yoku Wakannē Kedo (よく分かんねぇけど); 48. Anata no Koto ga (貴方のことが)
| 8 | November 17, 2025 | 978-4-592-16708-2 | — | — |
49. Koi o Suru tte (恋をするって); 50. Kareshi? (彼氏?); 51. Mada Hayai (まだ早い); 52. Darenidemo Arudesho (誰にでもあるでしょ); 53. Mō muri Kamo (もう無理かも); 54. Yoi Kanojo (良い彼女); 55. Jūden Kanryō (充電完了)
| 9 | February 27, 2026 | 978-4-592-16709-9 | — | — |
56. Dō Omou? (どう思う?); 57. Rabu Kome Mitai (ラブコメみたい); 58. Seiha no Himitsu (清葉の秘密); 59. Honki na no? (本気なの?); 60. Umarete Hajimete (生まれて初めて); 61. Watashi no Koto wa (私の事は); 62. Kimenakya Ikenai (決めなきゃいけない)
| 10 | June 17, 2026 | 978-4-592-16710-5 | — | — |
63. Watashi no Sei (私のせい); 64. Hontō no Oya (本当の親); 65. Futari no Soba ni (二人のそばに); 66. Okāsan (お母さん); 67. Tsunagatte Inakutemo (繋がっていなくても); 68. Ureshikatta (嬉しかった); 69. Uso Janai (嘘じゃない)
| 11 | November 17, 2026 | 978-4-592-16720-4 | — | — |
70. Kyō mo Ashita mo Asatte mo (今日も明日も明後日も); 71. Hamaranai (嵌まらない); 72. Wakatteru Desho? (分かってるでしょ?); 73. "Chi" no Omosa (”血”の重さ); 74. Futari no Hahaoya (2人の母親); 75. Hitotsu Dake no Onegai (ひとつだけのお願い); 76. Anata no Dai Kōbutsu (あなたの大好物)

=== Anime ===
In February 2024, it was announced that the series would receive an anime television series adaptation. It was produced by Doga Kobo and directed by Ryouki Kamitsubo, with series composition by Noboru Kimura, and character designs and chief animation direction by Miki Muto. The music was composed by Akki, Ginnojo Hoshi, and Shota Horie. While the first two episodes had an advanced screening at the United Cinemas Toyosu in Tokyo on March 16, 2025, the series aired from April 8 to June 24, 2025, on AT-X and other networks. The opening theme song is "Honey Lemon" (ハニーレモン), performed by Nacherry, and the ending theme song is "Like You o (>< = ><)o Love You?", performed by the "Shiunji Family Children" group (composed of Chika Anzai, Marika Kōno, Rie Takahashi, Hana Hishikawa and Kana Ichinose as their respective characters).

Crunchyroll is streaming the series. Medialink licensed the series in Southeast Asia and Oceania (except Australia and New Zealand) for streaming on Ani-One Asia's YouTube channel.

==== Episodes ====
| No. | Title | Directed by | Written by | Storyboarded by | Original release date |
|---|---|---|---|---|---|
| 1 | "What If...?" | Ryouki Kamitsubo | Noboru Kimura | Ryouki Kamitsubo | April 8, 2025 |
| 2 | "Now What" | Ryouki Kamitsubo | Noboru Kimura | Ryouki Kamitsubo | April 15, 2025 |
| 3 | "For Now" | Hiroshi Haraguchi | Michihiro Tsuchiya | Hiroshi Haraguchi | April 22, 2025 |
| 4 | "Respectively" | Seong-Min Kim | Noboru Kimura | Seong-Min Kim | April 29, 2025 |
| 5 | "Perhaps" | Kazue Komatsu | Michihiro Tsuchiya | Yūko Tanaka | May 6, 2025 |
| 6 | "Now's the Time" | Kunio Fujii | Noboru Kimura | Hajime Kawamura | May 13, 2025 |
| 7 | "Surely" | Mitsuhiro Oosako | Michihiro Tsuchiya | Mitsuhiro Oosako | May 20, 2025 |
| 8 | "Since Then" | Shuichi Sasaki | Noboru Kimura | Hiroaki Yoshikawa | May 27, 2025 |
| 9 | "Not Yet" | Kōki Uchinomiya | Michihiro Tsuchiya | Hiroaki Yoshikawa | June 3, 2025 |
| 10 | "Finally" | Daisuke Nishimura | Noboru Kimura | Daisuke Nishimura | June 10, 2025 |
| 11 | "So Then" | Sho Kitamura | Michihiro Tsuchiya | Sho Kitamura | June 17, 2025 |
| 12 | "Still" | Ryouki Kamitsubo | Noboru Kimura | Ryota Itō | June 24, 2025 |
