= Iwate Broadcasting Company =

Radio and television broadcaster in Iwate Prefecture, Japan

Iwate Broadcasting Co., Ltd
- Logo used since 1984

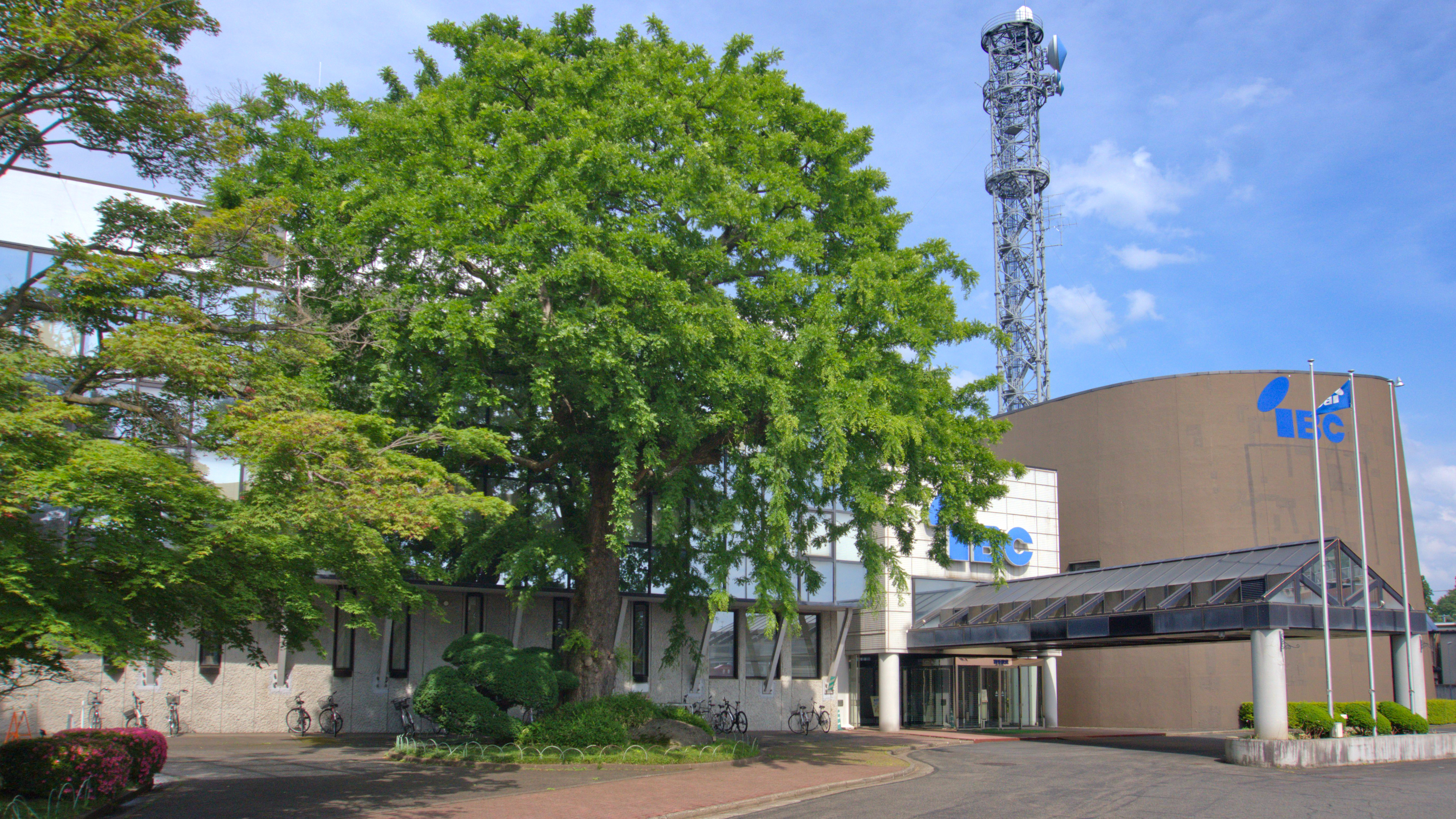
- Headquarters in Morioka, Iwate
- Trade name: IBC Iwate Broadcasting; IBC Radio & Television
- Native name: 株式会社アイビーシー岩手放送
- Romanized name: Kabushiki-gaisha IBC Iwate Hōsō
- Type: Private
- Industry: Media
- Founded: December 7, 1953; 72 years ago
- Headquarters: Shikecho, Morioka, Iwate Prefecture, Japan
- Key people: Takuya Mashita (president and CEO)
- Services: Radio and television network
- Subsidiaries: IBC Development Center
- Website: www.ibc.co.jp

JODF
- Morioka; Japan
- Broadcast area: Iwate Prefecture
- Frequencies: 684 kHz (AM); 9.06 MHz (FM)
- Branding: IBC Radio

Programming
- Language: Japanese
- Format: Talk, Sports
- Affiliations: JRN/NRN

Ownership
- Owner: Iwate Broadcasting Co., Ltd.

History
- First air date: December 25, 1953

Technical information
- Licensing authority: MIC
- Power: 5 kW (AM); 1 kW (FM)

Links
- Website: ibc.co.jp/radio/

JODF-DTV
- Iwate Prefecture; Japan
- City: Morioka
- Channels: Digital: 16 (UHF); Virtual: 6
- Branding: IBC Television

Programming
- Language: Japanese
- Affiliations: Japan News Network

Ownership
- Owner: Iwate Broadcasting Co., Ltd.

History
- First air date: September 1, 1959
- Former call signs: JODF-TV (1959–2012)
- Former channel numbers: Analog: 6 (VHF, 1959–2012)
- Former affiliations: All secondary: NET/ANN (1959–1996); Fuji TV/FNN/FNS (1959–1991); NTV/NNN/NNS (1959–1970)

Technical information
- Licensing authority: MIC

Links
- Website: www.ibc.co.jp/tv/

Iwate Broadcasting Co., Ltd (株式会社IBC岩手放送, Kabushiki-gaisha IBC Iwate Hōsō), also known as IBC, is a Japanese television and radio station affiliated with the Japan News Network (JNN). Their headquarters are located in Morioka, Iwate Prefecture.

Since April 2010, the station is available on Cable Networks Akita replacing TV-U Yamagata.
