= TBS News =

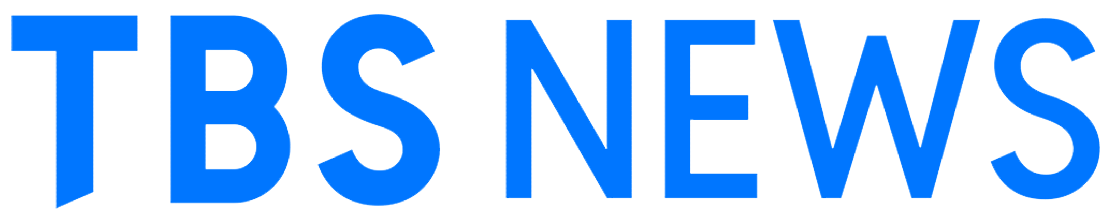
- Type: Cable television network
- Country: Japan
- Headquarters: Akasaka, Minato, Tokyo

Programming
- Language: Japanese
- Picture format: HDTV 1080i

Ownership
- Owner: Tokyo Broadcasting System Television, Inc.

History
- Launched: 1 April 1998; 28 years ago

Links
- Website: www.tbs.co.jp/cstbsnews/

TBS News (stylized in all-caps as TBS NEWS) is a Japanese cable and satellite news channel owned by Tokyo Broadcasting System Television. Using JNN's infrastructure in Japan and abroad, it broadcasts a continuous news service, with emphasis on breaking news.

== History ==
Satellite operator PerfecTV announced in February 1998 that it would launch TBS's JNN News Bird on April 1, as part of its basic package. In 2006, the channel was renamed TBS News Bird.

On March 1, 2010, the channel was made available on Hikari TV. With the agreement, its availability surpassed six million households. On April 1, 2012, it launched on NOTTV. On December 9, 2013, it announced that all of its Yokohama DeNA BayStars baseball telecasts would move to TBS Channel 2 starting in the 2014 season. In March 2015, it started carrying Chiba Lotte Marines games (until 2017).

On September 26, 2019, the channel was renamed TBS News. From April 18, 2022, with the launch of TBS News Dig, a stream was added to the site.
