= Kochi Broadcasting =

Radio and television station in Kochi Prefecture, Japan

Kochi Broadcasting Co., Ltd.
- Logo used since 1975

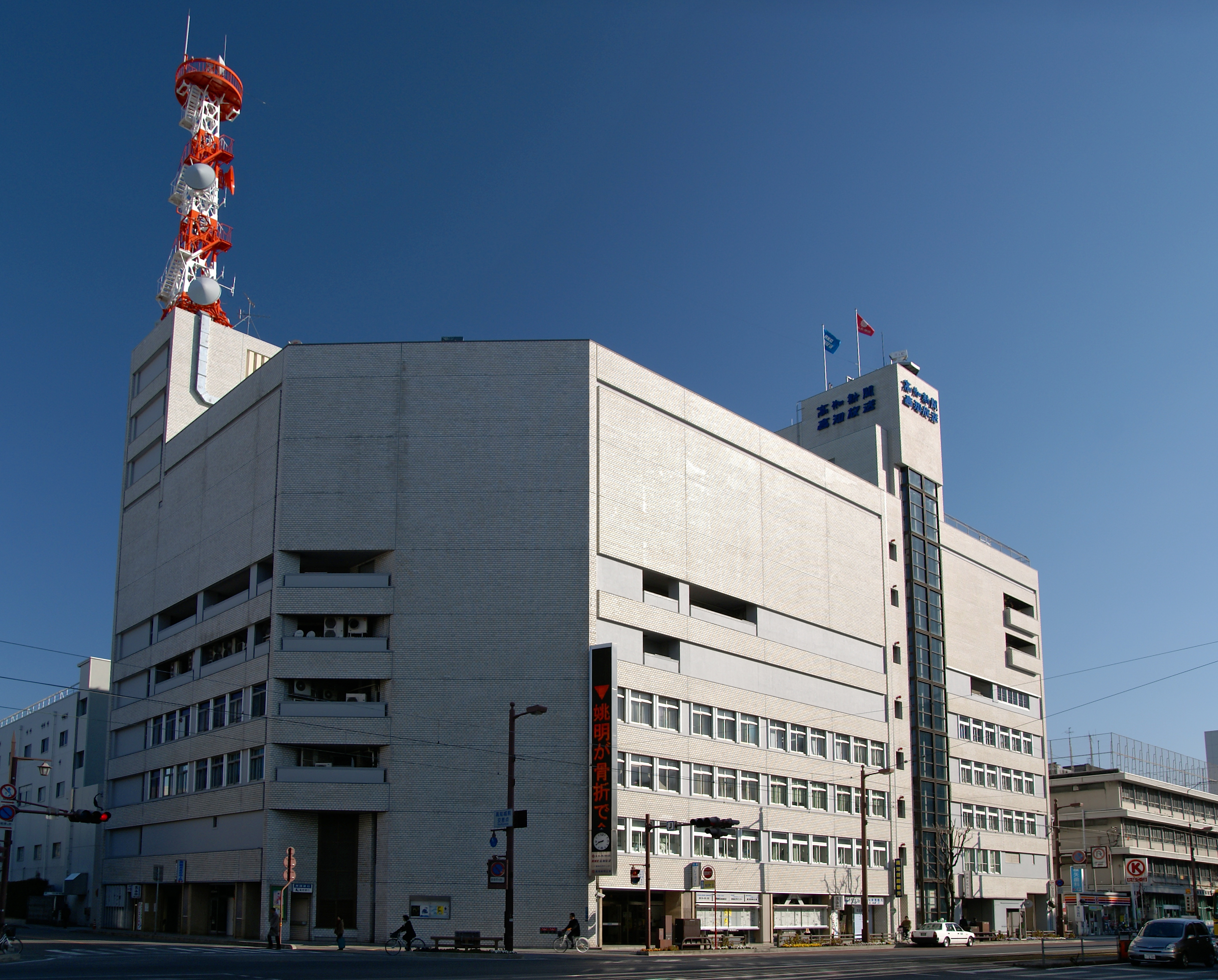
- Headquarters in Honmachi, Kochi
- Trade name: RKC
- Native name: 株式会社 高知放送
- Romanized name: Kabushikigaisha kōchihōsō
- Company type: Kabushiki gaisha
- Founded: February 18, 1953; 73 years ago
- Headquarters: 3-2-8 Honmachi, Kochi City, Kochi Prefecture, Japan
- Number of employees: 132
- Website: www.rkc-kochi.co.jp
- Footnotes / references Data from its Corporate Profile

JOZR
- Kōchi; Japan
- Broadcast area: Kōchi Prefecture
- Frequencies: 900 kHz (AM); 90.8 MHz (FM)
- Branding: RKC Radio

Programming
- Language: Japanese
- Format: Talk, Sports
- Affiliations: JRN, NRN

Ownership
- Owner: Kochi Broadcasting Co., Ltd.

History
- First air date: September 1, 1953

Technical information
- Licensing authority: MIC
- Power: 5 kW

Links
- Website: www.rkc-kochi.co.jp/radio/

JOZR-DTV
- Kōchi Prefecture; Japan
- City: Kōchi
- Channels: Digital: 17 (UHF); Virtual: 4
- Branding: RKC Television

Programming
- Affiliations: Nippon News Network and Nippon Television Network System

Ownership
- Owner: Kochi Broadcasting Co., Ltd.

History
- First air date: April 1, 1959
- Former call signs: JOZR-TV (1959–2011)
- Former channel numbers: 8 (analog VHF, 1959–2011)

Technical information
- Licensing authority: MIC

Links
- Website: www.rkc-kochi.co.jp/tv/

Kochi Broadcasting (高知放送, Kōchi Hōsō), also known as RKC (Radio Kochi Company), is a Japanese radio and television broadcaster. It was founded in 1953 and is headquartered in Kōchi, Japan. Kōchi Broadcasting is affiliated with NNN and NNS (TV), JRN, NRN (radio). It is a part of the Kochi Shimbun group.

Kochi Broadcasting began radio broadcasting in 1953, and launched television broadcasting in 1959.

== History ==
Following the implementation of the Three Radio Laws in 1950, bids for radio stations were being set up across Japan, including in Kochi Prefecture. On October 30, 1952, the Kochi Shimbun took the lead in organizing the initiator meeting of Kochi Radio, and the newspaper contributed more than 30% of the stock. The original headquarters of the station were located in a two-story building in the open space at the northwest corner of the Kochi Shimbun headquarters.

On August 1 of the following year, Radio Kochi received a preliminary license. On August 29, Radio Kochi began a trial broadcast. At 5:30 am on September 1, 1953, Radio Kochi officially started broadcasting, becoming the 20th commercial broadcasting company in Japan. In its first year of broadcasting, Radio Kochi had an income of 46.6 million yen, an expenditure of 62.17 million yen, and a loss of 15.57 million yen. On August 3, 1954, the Radio Kochi Union was established. As the demand for a salary increase was not met, Radio Kochi's labor union launched a 24-hour strike on July 2 of the following year, resulting in the suspension of a large number of programs. This was the first strike in the Japanese commercial broadcasting industry. In the end, the strike ended with management partly accepting the demands of the trade union. Afterwards, on November 30, 1961, the Radio Kochi union also went on strike. In 1956, Radio Kochi realized stock dividends for the first time.

In the television channel allocation plan issued by the Ministry of Posts and Telecommunications in 1957, Kochi Prefecture was allocated two channels. At that time, two companies in Kochi Prefecture – Radio Kochi and Kochi Television (not the current TV Kochi) applied for them. Under the government's adjustment, Kochi Television agreed to withdraw its application in October of the same year and joined the Radio Kochi camp; Radio Kochi received a preliminary license on October 22. In order to meet the hardware conditions required for television broadcasts, Radio Kochi expanded its headquarters in 1958 from two floors to six floors. On March 2, 1959, Radio Kochi made its first TV test broadcast. On March 19, Radio Kochi obtained the official TV broadcasting license. A week later, on March 26, Radio Kochi began broadcasting a trial TV program. Kochi Radio officially started broadcasting TV programs at 9:30 am on April 1, 1959. Since other commercial TV stations in Shikoku were all members of the Nippon Television Network at that time, and the commercial TV microwave network could only accommodate one network, the TV division of Radio Kochi joined NTV after it started broadcasting.

With the popularization of TV sets and the development of the Japanese economy, Radio Kochi's TV income increased rapidly, while the broadcasting sector stagnated. Radio Kochi's broadcasting department's advertising revenue first declined in 1959. On January 1, 1962, Radio Kochi changed its company name to Kochi Broadcasting, marking its entry into an era dominated by television. In November 1963, following the 10th anniversary of the launch, Kochi Broadcasting hosted the Kochi Performance of the Vienna Boys' Choir. On October 1 of the same year, the groundbreaking ceremony for Kochi Broadcasting's new headquarters (Kochi Shimbun Broadcasting Hall) was held. The building has eight floors above ground and three floors underground. The first phase of the project was completed in 1966, and the second phase was completed in 1972. At the end of the year, the number of television sets in Kochi Prefecture exceeded 100,000 households, with a penetration rate of 47.6%. Kochi Broadcasting established a subsidiary RKC Production (RKCプロダクション) in 1964 to further expand the television production business. In May 1965, the radio division of Kochi Broadcasting joined JRN and NRN. On the other hand, the relationship between labor and capital in Kochi Broadcasting has been tense for a long time. Beginning on May 20, 1966, the Kochi Broadcasting Union launched an 85-day strike campaign. Afterwards, Kochi Broadcasting's labor and management sides fell into serious confrontation for a long time, and it was not until March 1981 that reconciliation was achieved.

When the TV division of Radio Kochi started broadcasting, grassroots employees hoped to affiliate with Tokyo Broadcasting System, which also had a radio station, but due to physical constraints, they instead joined the Nippon Television Network. In 1966, Kochi Broadcasting officially joined NNN. In 1969, on the eve of the launch of TV Kochi, the second commercial TV station in Kochi Prefecture, Kochi Broadcasting decided to broadcast TBS news bulletins in the morning to strengthen its relationship with TBS because it was expected that the new station would join the Fuji TV network. In January 1970, Kochi Broadcasting asked TBS to join the Japan News Network, but was rejected by TBS. After this move became known to Nippon TV, the relationship between Kochi Broadcasting and Nippon TV deteriorated seriously.

In April 1970, TV Kochi started broadcasting, which led to intensified competition in the TV industry in the prefecture, and the revenue of Kochi Broadcasting's TV division decreased for the first time. However, due to the booming Japanese economy at that time, Kochi Broadcasting's advertising revenue quickly returned to rapid growth. In 1977, Kochi Broadcasting began to use computers in its business, which greatly improved its efficiency. Kochi Broadcasting also actively participated in local contributions. Since 1972, Kochi Broadcasting has held the "Hometown Festival" (ふるさとまつり) event every year, becoming one of the representative large-scale events in Kochi Prefecture.

Kochi Broadcasting began to broadcast digital TV signals on October 1, 2006, and stopped broadcasting analog TV on July 24, 2011. Kochi Broadcasting started construction of its new headquarters in April 2020, and it was completed in September 2021. On March 28, 2022, RKC began broadcasting from the new headquarters.
