= Japan News Network =

Japanese TV news network

- Type: Broadcast television network
- Country: Japan
- Founded: 1 August 1959
- Owner: TBS Television
- Official website: Official website

The Japan News Network (JNN; Japanese: ジャパン・ニュース・ネットワーク, romanized: Japan Nyūsu Nettowāku) is a Japanese commercial television network run by TBS Television, owned by TBS Holdings (which is a part of the Mitsui Group keiretsu and highly cooperating with the Mainichi Shimbun despite the lack of the latter's shareholding in TBS Holdings). The network's responsibility includes the syndication of national television news bulletins to its regional affiliates, and news exchange between the stations. Its affiliate stations also broadcast non-news programs originating from TBS Television. Founded on 1 August 1959, JNN is made up of 28 full-time affiliates.

It also operates the 24-hour satellite and cable news channel TBS News and the FAST channel TBS NEWS DIG.

== History ==
=== Initial news exchange agreement ===
In 1956, when there were only four commercial television stations in Japan (Nippon Television, Tokyo Radio and Television (hereinafter referred to as KRT), Osaka Television Broadcasting, and Chubu Nippon Broadcasting), the television network was quite loose. Nippon Television and KRT in Tokyo had to sell their programs to the two commercial stations (Osaka TV Broadcasting and Chubu Nippon Broadcasting) outside of Tokyo as much as possible in order to recoup their production costs and meet the needs of advertisers. This puts the two stations in an advantageous position by allowing them to freely choose the programs they want to syndicate.On 15 November 1956, four commercial television stations signed the Memorandum of Understanding on Television Broadcasting Program Exchange among Four Companies, which specifically stipulated matters related to the syndication of programs.Later, Hokkaido Broadcasting and RKB Mainichi Broadcasting joined the agreement, and the four-company agreement was expanded to a six-company agreement. There were no major changes in the contents of the agreement at that time.

The agreement later expanded into 10 member stations as Sanyo Broadcasting, Nishinippon Broadcasting, Yomiuri TV, and Television Nishinippon joined into the agreement. With that, the contents of the agreement were drastically changed, centering on special contributions.In October 1957, the Ministry of Posts and Telecommunications issued licenses for 34 commercial TV broadcasters as it became the period of rapid expansion of commercial broadcasters in Japan. The opening of commercial television outside the metropolitan area meant that the importance of interconnection was increasing.During this period, only a limited number of frequencies available were allocated to few broadcasters, resulting in limited affiliation options for the succeeding broadcasters.

In October 1958, Osaka Television Broadcasting, RKB Mainichi Broadcasting, and Sanyo Broadcasting were explicitly part of the same syndication as KRT, while the Nippon Television syndication consisted of Yomiuri TV, Television Nishinippon, and Nishinippon Broadcasting, and the other three were cross-networked with a slight advantage for KRT.

At that time, Nippon Television, which had its own highlight programs such as baseball broadcasts, was trying to expand its network through the broadcasting rights of sports events. In response to the increasing competition with the broadcaster at that time, it then aired drama and news programming.The lack of nationwide coverage for commercial broadcasting in Japan makes it even more crucial for local operators to work together while gathering news.In June 1958, KRT, Chubu-Nippon Broadcasting System, Osaka Television Broadcasting, RKB Mainichi Broadcasting, and Hokkaido Broadcasting began to exchange news materials through a network agreement.

=== Establishment of Japan News Network ===
The broadcast of the wedding of Crown Prince Akihito (later the 125th Emperor, now Emperor Emeritus) and Crown Princess Michiko (now Empress Emerita) on 1 April 1959, played an important role in bringing about the final signing of the news agreement. On 1 August 1959, with the signing of the new news agreement, the first true national commercial TV network in the country - Japan News Network - was formally established.

The charter members of the network were: KRT (now known as TBS Television), the network flagship station, Hokkaido Broadcasting, Tohoku Broadcasting, Shizuoka Broadcasting, Shin-etsu Broadcasting, Broadcasting System of Niigata, Hokuriku Broadcasting, Chubu-Nippon Broadcasting, Osaka Television Broadcasting (which later merged with Asahi Broadcasting Corporation), Nihonkai Telecasting, Sanyo Broadcasting, RCC Broadcasting, RKB Mainichi Broadcasting, Nagasaki Broadcasting, Kumamoto Broadcasting, and Minaminihon Broadcasting.Upon the establishment, it already had 16 stations or covered about 80% of Japan's population at that time.Prior to its establishment, there were proposed names for the network which includes Sakura News Network and All-Japan News Network (not to be confused with All-Nippon News Network, which was established in 1970), but it then adopted the current name at the end. As stipulated in the network agreement:

- TBS and the member affiliates of the JNN network agreed, upon the creation of JNN, to share news information between the networks while providing both national content for JNN programming produced by TBS and regional news items for their respective programs within their broadcast markets
- TBS' non-news programming are to be aired on the JNN network as well
- TBS prohibited the regional members from airing programming, including news, from its competitor stations

In the early days, each station was free to replace the title of the news program, but on 31 March 1975, after the affiliation change in Kansai from Asahi Broadcasting TV to Mainichi Broadcasting, all network member stations' news branding was unified on the JNN system, with TBS-produced newscasts airing on the regional stations while regional broadcasters provided local content and reporters and news crews for the national programs.

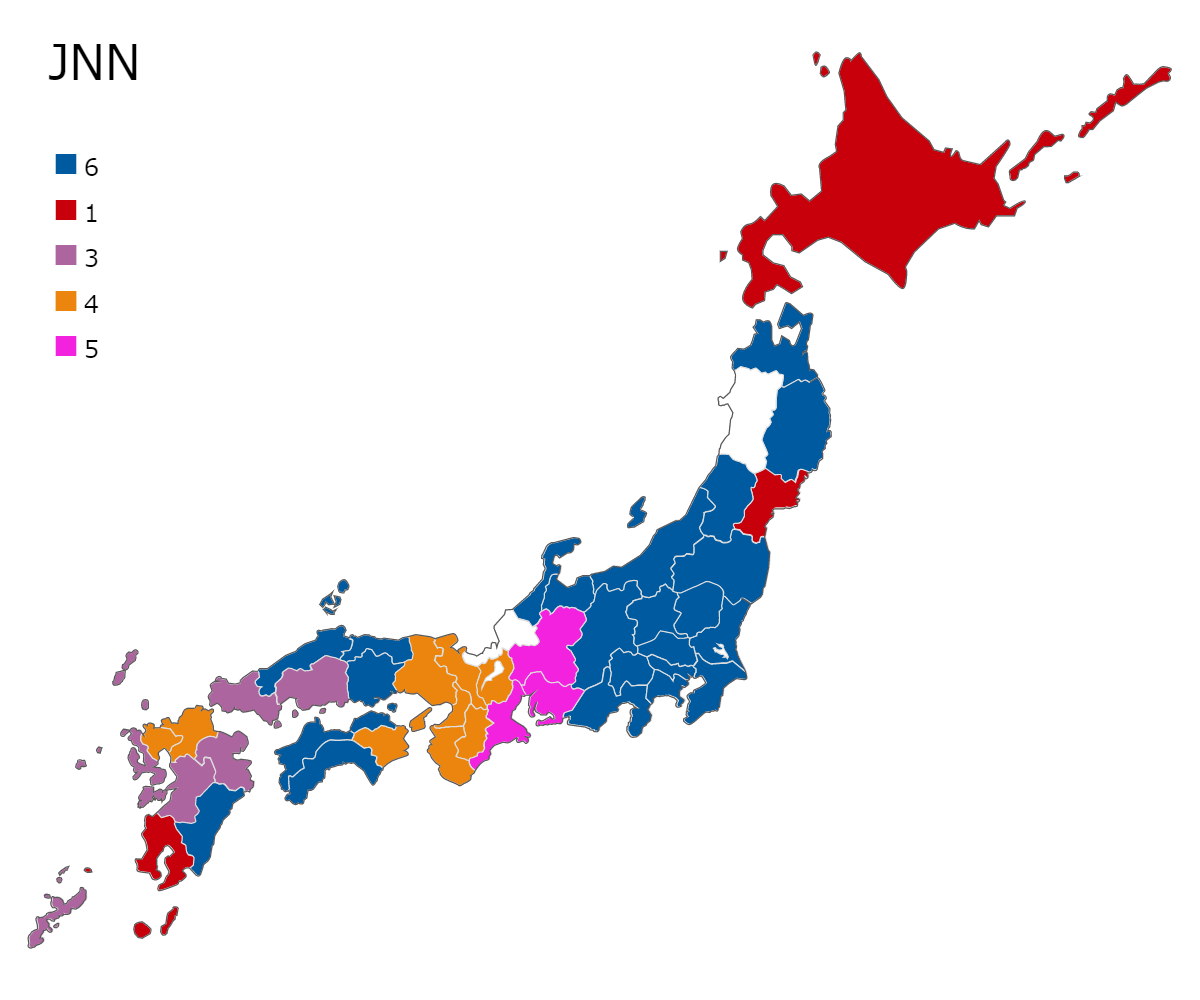
LCN assignments of JNN affiliates

Until 1992 (when i-Television in Ehime became the last broadcaster to be affiliated with JNN), multiple broadcasters either dropped their affiliation with JNN (such as Nihonkai Telecasting when Broadcasting System of San-in started broadcasting) or have joined JNN upon their establishment (such as Iwate Broadcasting Company, Ryukyu Broadcasting, and Aomori Television). At present, it consists of 28 full-time stations. There are no JNN member stations in Akita, Fukui, Tokushima, and Saga prefectures.

On April 21, 2025, the JNN Park at Akasaka Park Tower opened, centralizing the operations of the Tokyo branch offices of 11 JNN affiliates into one floor. The area includes shared spaces such as conference rooms, phone booths and concentration booths.

== List of affiliates ==
Stations are listed mostly in Japanese order of prefectures which is mirrored in ISO 3166-2:JP, with exceptions for the Kantō region, Aichi-Gifu-Mie, Kansai region (except Mie), Tottori-Shimane and Okayama-Kagawa, which form single wide broadcasting markets respectively. Some broadcasters listed here also have radio operations (either under a single company or as a subsidiary of its holding company).

Broadcasting area(s)		Station			LCN	Start date of broadcast	Date of affiliation	Note(s)
Prefecture	Region	On air branding	Abbr.	Call sign	LCN	Start date of broadcast	Date of affiliation	Note(s)
Hokkaidō		Hokkaido Broadcasting	HBC	JOHR-DTV	1	1 April 1957	1 August 1959	Core station
Aomori	Tōhoku	Aomori TV	ATV	JOAI-DTV	6	1 December 1969	31 March 1975	
Iwate	Tōhoku	IBC Iwate Broadcasting	IBC	JODF-DTV	6	1 September 1959	1 September 1959	
Miyagi	Tōhoku	Tohoku Broadcasting	tbc	JOIR-DTV	1	1 April 1959	1 August 1959	Semi-core station outside the Five-Company Alliance
Yamagata	Tōhoku	TV-U Yamagata	TUY	JOWI-DTV	6	1 October 1989	1 October 1989	
Fukushima	Tōhoku	TV-U Fukushima	TUF	JOKI-DTV	6	4 December 1983	1 October 1983	
Kantō region		TBS TV	TBS	JORX-DTV	6	1 April 1955	1 August 1959	Eastern flagship station; core station
Niigata	Chūbu	Niigata Broadcasting	BSN	JODR-DTV	6	24 December 1958	1 August 1959	
Toyama	Chūbu	Tulip TV (Note: Until September 30, 1992, using the name TV-U Toyama.)	TUT	JOJH-DTV	6	1 October 1990	1 October 1990	
Ishikawa	Chūbu	Hokuriku Broadcasting	MRO	JOMR-DTV	6	1 December 1958	1 August 1959	
Yamanashi	Chūbu	TV Yamanashi	UTY	JOGI-DTV	6	1 April 1970	1 April 1970	
Nagano	Chūbu	Shin-etsu Broadcasting	SBC	JOSR-DTV	6	25 October 1958	1 August 1959	
Shizuoka	Chūbu	Shizuoka Broadcasting	SBS	JOVR-DTV	6	1 November 1958	1 August 1959	Semi-core station outside the Five-Company Alliance
Aichi and Gifu	Chūbu	CBC TV	CBC	JOGX-DTV	5	1 December 1956	1 August 1959	Core station
Mie	Kansai	CBC TV	CBC	JOGX-DTV	5	1 December 1956	1 August 1959	Core station
Kansai region (except Mie)		MBS TV	MBS	JOOY-DTV	4	1 March 1959	31 March 1975	Western flagship station; core station
Tottori and Shimane	Chūgoku	San-in Broadcasting	BSS	JOHF-DTV	6	15 December 1959	15 December 1959	
Hiroshima	Chūgoku	RCC Broadcasting	RCC	JOER-DTV	3	1 April 1959	1 August 1959	Semi-core station outside the Five-Company Alliance
Yamaguchi	Chūgoku	TV Yamaguchi	tys	JOLI-DTV	3	1 April 1970	1 April 1970	
Okayama	Chūgoku	RSK Sanyo Broadcasting	RSK	JOYR-DTV	6	1 June 1958	1 August 1959	Semi-core station outside the Five-Company Alliance
Kagawa	Shikoku	RSK Sanyo Broadcasting	RSK	JOYR-DTV	6	1 June 1958	1 August 1959	Semi-core station outside the Five-Company Alliance
Ehime	Shikoku	i-TV (Note: Until September 30, 2002, using the name Iyo TV.)	ITV	JOEH-DTV	6	1 October 1992	1 October 1992	
Kōchi	Shikoku	TV Kochi	KUTV	JORI-DTV	6	1 April 1970	1 April 1970	
Fukuoka	Kyūshū	RKB Mainichi Broadcasting	rkb	JOFR-DTV	4	1 March 1958	1 August 1959	Core station
Nagasaki	Kyūshū	Nagasaki Broadcasting	NBC	JOUR-DTV	3	1 January 1959	1 August 1959	
Kumamoto	Kyūshū	Kumamoto Broadcasting	RKK	JOBF-DTV	3	1 April 1959	1 August 1959	
Ōita	Kyūshū	Oita Broadcasting	OBS	JOGF-DTV	3	1 October 1959	1 October 1959	
Miyazaki	Kyūshū	Miyazaki Broadcasting	MRT	JONF-DTV	6	1 October 1960	1 October 1960	
Kagoshima	Kyūshū	Minaminihon Broadcasting	MBC	JOCF-DTV	1	1 April 1959	1 August 1959	
Okinawa	Kyūshū	Ryūkyū Broadcasting	RBC	JORR-DTV	3	1 June 1960	15 May 1972	

=== Areas without a JNN station ===
Prefecture	Region	Station(s) from neighbouring prefecture	News gathering
Akita	Tōhoku	IBC (Iwate)	ATV (Ōdate), TUY (from Nikaho to Oga), IBC (rest of Akita) and tbc (certain big events)
Fukui	Chūbu	MRO (Ishikawa) and MBS (Kansai region)	MRO (Reihoku region and Tsuruga City; also handled by CBC in certain cases) and MBS (Reinan region except Tsuruga City)
Tokushima	Shikoku	MBS (Kansai region) and RSK (Okayama and Kagawa)	MBS Tokushima Bureau
Saga	Kyūshū	RKB (Fukuoka)	RKB

=== Former affiliate stations ===
Single asterisk (*) indicates former primary affiliate

Broadcasting area(s)		Station			Ch.	Years of affiliation	Current affiliation	Current JNN affiliate	Note(s)
Prefecture	Region	On air branding	Abbr.	Call sign	Ch.	Years of affiliation	Current affiliation	Current JNN affiliate	Note(s)
Fukushima	Tōhoku	Fukushima TV*	FTV	JOPX-TV	11	1971–1983	FNN/FNS	TUF	(Note: Affiliated with JNN from 1 June 1971 to 31 March 1983. Owing to network decisions, it changed networks to FNN/FNS. JNN programming returned to Fukushima in December of that year when TUF launched.)
Kansai region (except Mie)		Asahi Broadcasting*	ABC	JONR-TV	6	1959–1975	ANN	MBS	(Note: Affiliated with JNN from 1 August 1959 to 30 March 1975. Swapped networks with MBS, which at the time was with ANN, owing to shareholder issues with the network.)
Tottori and Shimane	Chūgoku	Nihonkai TV*	NKT	JOJX-TV	1	1959	NNN/NNS	BSS	(Note: Affiliated with JNN from 1 August 1959 to 14 December 1959. Changed networks to NTV when BSS started broadcasting and took TBS's programming.)

== Affiliates that wanted to join but gave up ==
Broadcasting area(s)		Station			Ch.	Current affiliation	Current NNN/NNS affiliate	Note(s)
Prefecture	Region	On air branding	Abbr.	Call sign	Ch.	Current affiliation	Current NNN/NNS affiliate	Note(s)
Aomori	Tōhoku	RAB	RAB	JOGR-TV	1	NNN/NNS	ATV	Due to business reasons.
Akita	Tōhoku	ABS	ABS	JOTR-TV	11	NNN/NNS	N/A	This is attributed to the technical reasons of the microwave circuit.
Toyama	Chūbu	Kitanihon Broadcasting	KNB	JOLR-TV	1	NNN/NNS	TUT	Initially, it was assumed that KNB would become an affiliate with Radio Tokyo Television (now TBS Television) due to its network agreement with the neighboring JNN stations. However, KNB ultimately decided to prioritize affiliating with Nippon TV, driven by factors such as the station's strong sales performance during broadcasts and its existing contracts to air professional baseball games.
Fukui	Chūbu	Fukui Broadcasting Corporation	FBC	JOPR-TV	11	NNN/NNS/ANN	N/A	To avoid conflicts with Hokuriku Broadcasting.
Ehime	Shikoku	Nankai Broadcasting	RNB	JOAF-TV	10	NNN/NNS	ITV	For technical reasons over the microwave circuit and avoiding competition with Chugoku Broadcasting and Oita Broadcasting.
Kochi	Shikoku	Kochi Broadcasting	RKC	JOZR-TV	8	NNN/NNS	KUTV	Initially, the decision was made to affiliate with Nippon Television due to its higher popularity at the time of the station's opening and technical-related issues. In 1970, after resolving the issues, the second commercial broadcasting station was supposed to be affiliated with Fuji TV (TV Kochi). However, the relationship between the company and Fuji TV deteriorated, prompting consideration of a switch to TBS, which would have involved leaving the NNN network and joining JNN. Fortunately, TV Kochi, the second station, joined JNN just before the new station launched, rendering the affiliation change unnecessary.
Saga	Kyūshū	Saga Television Station	sts	JOSH-TV	36	FNN/FNS	N/A	It started as a Fuji TV affiliated station, but in the early 1970s, an affiliation change to the TBS system was planned with the help of Nagasaki Broadcasting. As a result, it did not materialize, and the Kaneko family, the proponent who is said to have planned the affiliate change, was forced out of business by Fuji Television and TV Nishinippon.
