= Miyazaki Broadcasting =

Radio and TV station in Miyazaki Prefecture, Japan

Miyazaki Broadcasting Co., Ltd.
- Logo used since 2026

- Headquarters in Miyazaki
- Trade name: MRT
- Native name: 株式会社宮崎放送
- Romanized name: Kabushikigaisha Miyazakihōsō
- Formerly: Radio Miyazaki K.K. (1954–1961)
- Type: Kabushiki gaisha
- Founded: March 24, 1954
- Headquarters: 4-6-7 Tachibana-dori Nishi, Miyazaki City, Miyazaki Prefecture, Japan
- Key people: Keizo Tsukuma (President and CEO)
- Number of employees: 229 (2022)
- Website: mrt.jp
- Footnotes; Data from its Corporate Profile

JONF
- Miyazaki; Japan
- Broadcast area: Miyazaki Prefecture
- Frequencies: 936 kHz (AM); 90.4 MHz (FM)
- Branding: MRT Radio 936 (MRT ラジオ 936, MRT rajio 936; "Miyazaki Broadcasting Radio 936 kHz")

Programming
- Language: Japanese
- Format: Talk, Sports
- Affiliations: JRN, NRN

Ownership
- Owner: Miyazaki Broadcasting Co., Ltd.

History
- First air date: March 15, 1954

Technical information
- Licensing authority: MIC
- Power: 5 kW

Links
- Website: mrt.jp/radio

JONF-DTV
- Miyazaki Prefecture; Japan
- City: Miyazaki
- Channels: Digital: 15 (UHF); Virtual: 6
- Branding: MRT Television

Programming
- Language: Japanese
- Affiliations: Japan News Network

Ownership
- Owner: Miyazaki Broadcasting Co., Ltd.

History
- First air date: October 1, 1960
- Former call signs: JONF-TV (1960-2011)
- Former channel numbers: 10 (analog VHF, 1960-2011)

Technical information
- Licensing authority: MIC

Links
- Website: mrt.jp/television

Miyazaki Broadcasting Co., Ltd. (株式会社宮崎放送, Miyazaki Hōsō kabushiki gaisha) is a broadcasting station in Miyazaki Prefecture, Japan, and it is affiliated with JRN, NRN (radio) and JNN (TV). It is owned by the government of the prefecture, Mainichi Shimbun, the Bank of Miyazaki and various investors with fewer stocks.

The name MRT comes from Miyazaki Radio and Television; the name was adopted in 1961 upon changing from RMK (Radio Miyazaki K.K.). MRT commences radio broadcasting in 1954, and started television broadcasting in 1960. In December 2006, MRT started digital terrestrial television broadcasting.

== Capital composition ==
Information as of March 31, 2015:

Capital	Total number of shares issued	Number of shareholders
162,000,000 yen	324,000 shares	136

Shareholder	Number of shares held	Proportion
Miyazaki Broadcasting Stock Ownership Meeting	32,400 shares	10.00%
Mainichi Shimbun Publishing	32,000 shares	9.87%
Miyazaki Prefectural Government	31,500 shares	9.72%
Miyazaki Bank	16,200 shares	5.00%
Nippon Life Insurance	14,000 shares	4.32%
Asahi Kasei	12,000 shares	3.70%
Toshiba	10,000 shares	3.08%
Asahi Life Insurance	10,000 shares	3.08%
Dai-ichi Life	10,000股	3.08%

== History ==
On May 30, 1953, the Ministry of Posts and Telecommunications announced the frequency allocation plan for broadcasting in Miyazaki Prefecture. However, at that time, no industry in Miyazaki Prefecture was interested in applying to establish a private radio station Minaminihon Radio (now Minaminihon Broadcasting) from neighboring Kagoshima Prefecture intended to build a relay station in Miyazaki and starting its broadcasts in the prefecture. There was a strong reaction against Yamaguchi Toma, the then president of Hyuga Nichi Shimbun (now Miyazaki Nichi Shimbun), and he joined forces with politicians and financial figures in Miyazaki Prefecture to apply for the establishment of a private radio station. On December 17 of the same year, Radio Miyazaki (ラジオ宮崎) applied for a broadcasting license, held a founding conference on March 17 of the following year, and registered the company on the 24th. At 5:20 in the morning on July 1, 1954, Radio Miyazaki officially started broadcasting. Initially it broadcast on 1490 kc, but the station faced interference from Radio Yamanashi and the AFN Far East Network station in Gunsan, who both used the same frequency. To avoid direct interference, the station moved to 1480 kc (the only such occupier of said frequency in Japan at the time) on October 1, 1956. The Nobeoka relay station opened in November 1956 and the Miyakonojo relay station in May 1958. Thanks to the frequency change and the opening of the relay stations, the service area increased.

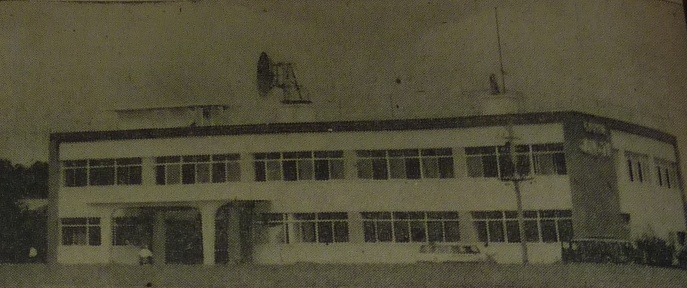
Headquarters building at the time of the start of analog television broadcasts (1960)

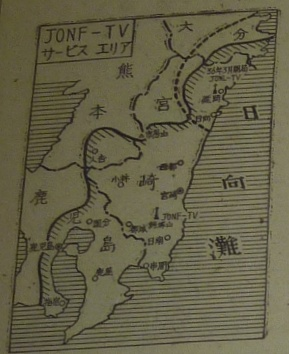
Television coverage area in 1960 (Hyuga Hishin Shimbun, page 12, October 1, 1960)

Radio Miyazaki applied for a television broadcast license on June 25, 1956. In order to expand the coverage of radio waves, Miyazaki TV chose to build a signal transmitting station on the top of Mt. Crozuka with an altitude of 1,119 meters. It was also a rare attempt in Japan to build a signal transmitting station on the top of the mountain at that time. At the same time, Radio Miyazaki also increased the number of employees and built a television broadcast hall to meet the hardware and manpower requirements for broadcasting television. On October 1, 1960, Radio Miyazaki officially began broadcasting its television station and joined the JNN network. The following year, in order to reflect the actual situation of concurrent broadcasting and television operations, Radio Miyazaki changed its company name to Miyazaki Broadcasting, the abbreviation changed from the old RMK to the current MRT. In 1962, Miyazaki Broadcasting achieved a 10% stock dividend. In 1964, the 10th anniversary of its founding, Miyazaki Broadcasting renovated the Broadcasting Center and broadcast many commemorative special programs. On December 10, 1966, Miyazaki Broadcasting started broadcasting in color.

In 1977, Miyazaki Broadcasting began to introduce the electronic news gathering (ENG) system. In the same year, Miyazaki Broadcasting decided to build a new building in the center of Miyazaki, and construction started in 1982. To commemorate the 30th anniversary of the broadcast and as part of corporate identity, Miyazaki Broadcasting launched a new logo in 1984. At the end of August of the same year, the new Miyazaki Broadcasting Center was completed. The building has one floor underground and seven floors above ground, with a total floor area of 12,700 square meters and a cost of 3.3 billion yen. The first to third floors of the building are the commercial and cultural facilities MRT micc; the fourth to seventh floors are the office spaces of Miyazaki Broadcasting, of which the fourth floor is a broadcast recording studio and the fifth floor is a television studio. Starting from September 1 of the same year, Miyazaki Broadcasting began to broadcast programs from the new headquarters.

Former logo used from 2014 to 2026

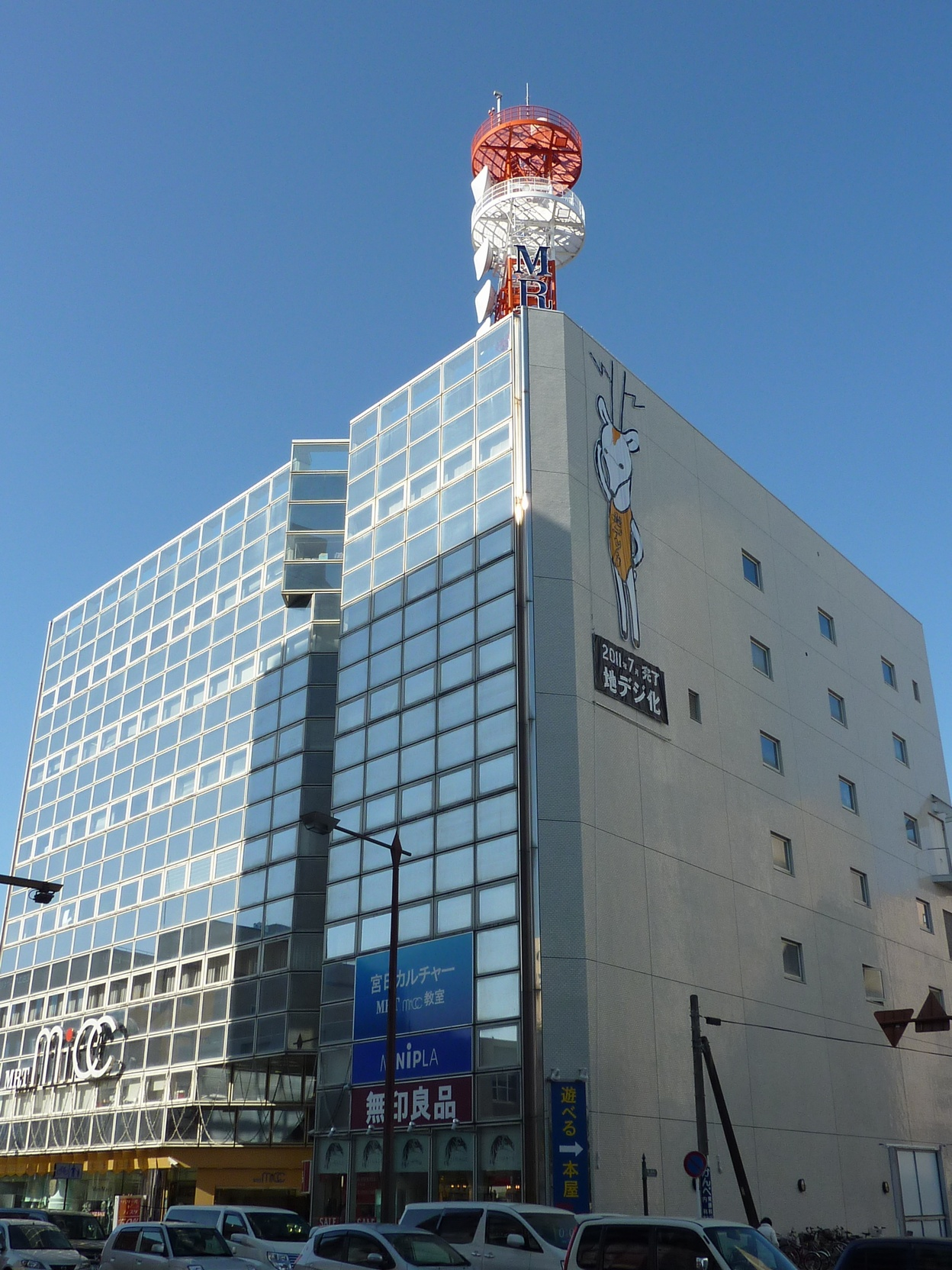
Former headquarters in Tachibadanorinishi

Miyazaki Broadcasting began broadcasting digital TV signals on December 1, 2006, and ended broadcasting analog TV signals on July 24, 2011. In 2014, Miyazaki Broadcasting launched a new logo on the occasion of its 60th anniversary. In 2026, Miyazaki Broadcasting moved to a new headquarters and launched a new logo.
