= Broadcasting System of Niigata =

Radio and television broadcaster in Japan

BSN Media Holdings Inc.

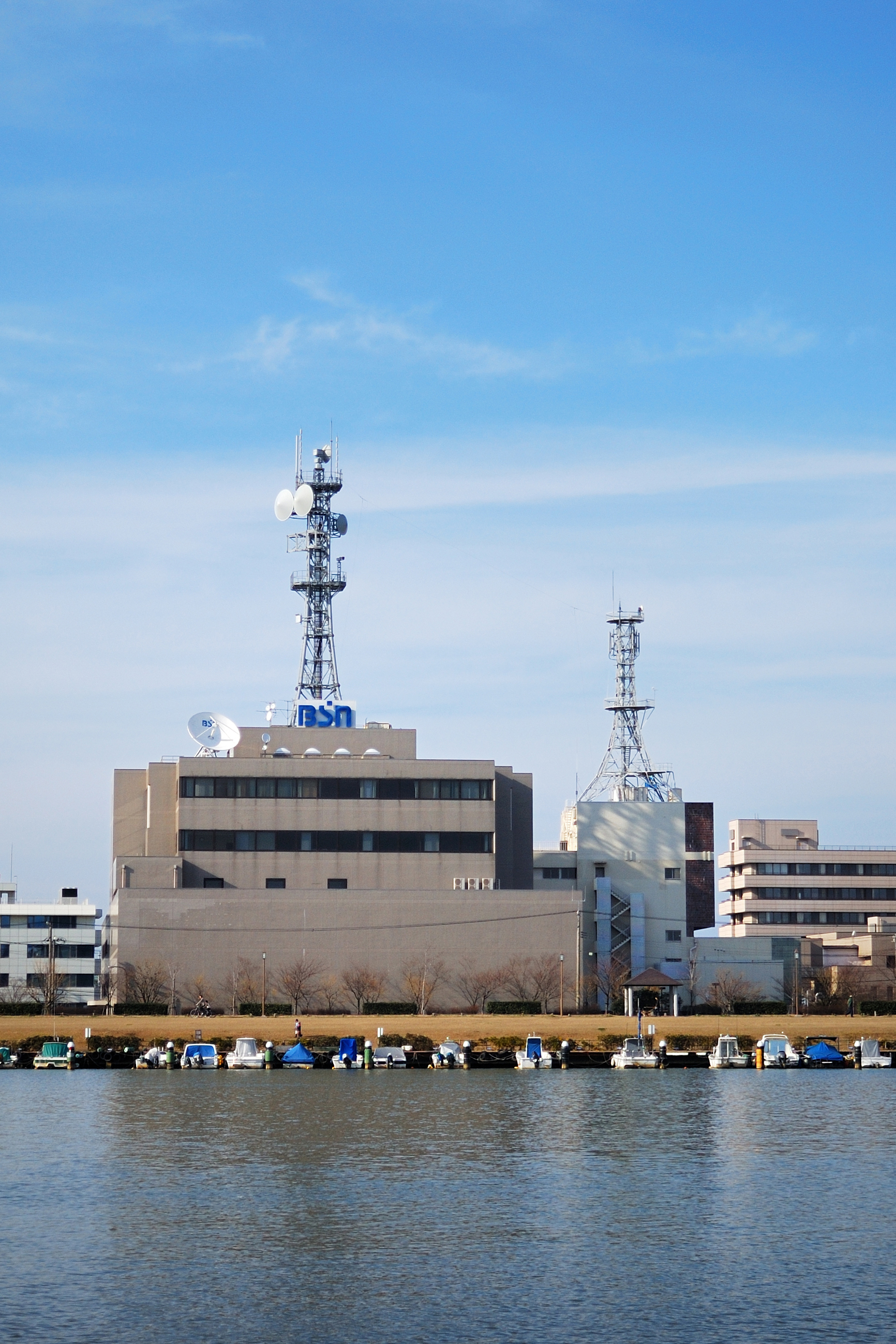
- Headquarters in Chūō-ku, Niigata
- Native name: 株式会社BSNメディアホールディングス
- Romanized name: Kabushiki-gaisha BSN Media hōrudingusu
- Formerly: Radio Niigata KK (1952–1958); Broadcasting System of Niigata Inc. (1958–2023)
- Type: Public
- Traded as: TYO: 9408
- Industry: Radio, television
- Founded: 14 October 1952; 74 years ago
- Headquarters: Kawashicho, Chūō-ku, Niigata, Niigata Prefecture, Japan
- Subsidiaries: Broadcasting System of Niigata; BSN Wave; BSN I-NET; B&ITec
- Website: ohbsn.com/holdings

JODR
- Niigata; Japan
- Broadcast area: Niigata Prefecture
- Frequencies: 1116 kHz (AM); 92.7 MHz (FM)
- Branding: BSN Radio

Programming
- Language: Japanese
- Format: Talk, Sports
- Affiliations: JRN/NRN

History
- First air date: December 24, 1952

Technical information
- Licensing authority: MIC
- Power: 20,000 watts

Links
- Website: https://www.ohbsn.com/radio

JODR-DTV
- Niigata Prefecture; Japan
- City: Niigata
- Channels: Digital: 17; Virtual: 6
- Branding: BSN Television

Programming
- Language: Japanese
- Affiliations: Japan News Network

Ownership
- Owner: Broadcasting System of Niigata Inc.

History
- First air date: December 24, 1958
- Former call signs: JODR-TV (1958-2011)
- Former channel numbers: Analog: 5 (VHF, 1958-2011)

Technical information
- Licensing authority: MIC

Links
- Website: ohbsn.com/tv

Corporate information
- Native name: 株式会社新潟放送
- Romanized name: Kabushiki-gaisha Niigata Hōsō
- Type: Subsidiary
- Industry: Radio and television network
- Founded: September 5, 2022
- Headquarters: Kawashicho, Chūō-ku, Niigata, Niigata Prefecture, Japan
- Owner: BSN Media Holdings

Broadcasting System of Niigata Inc. (株式会社新潟放送, Kabushikigaisha Niigata Hōsō; BSN) is a broadcasting station affiliated with the Japan News Network (JNN), the Japan Radio Network (JRN) and the National Radio Network (NRN) in Niigata, Niigata. It broadcasts in Niigata Prefecture, Japan, and was established on October 14, 1952. As of 2023, the company is a subsidiary of BSN Media Holdings.

== History ==
BSN was established as Radio Niigata Co. Ltd. on October 14, 1952. The first test broadcasts were conducted on December 5 and started regular broadcasts on December 24.

The RNK building was affected by the Niigata fire of October 1, 1955.

On December 21, 1958, in the anticipation for the start of television broadcasts four days later, RNK broadcast I Want to Be a Shellfish, a fictionalization of the suicide memoirs of Tetsutaro Kato in 1944. The play was broadcast on October 31 the same year in Kanto.

On December 25, 1958, RNK TV signed on (JODR-TV, VHF channel 5). In 2006, BSN started digital broadcasting; it ceased analog broadcasting operations on July 24, 2011.
