= Aomori Television =

JOAI-DTV

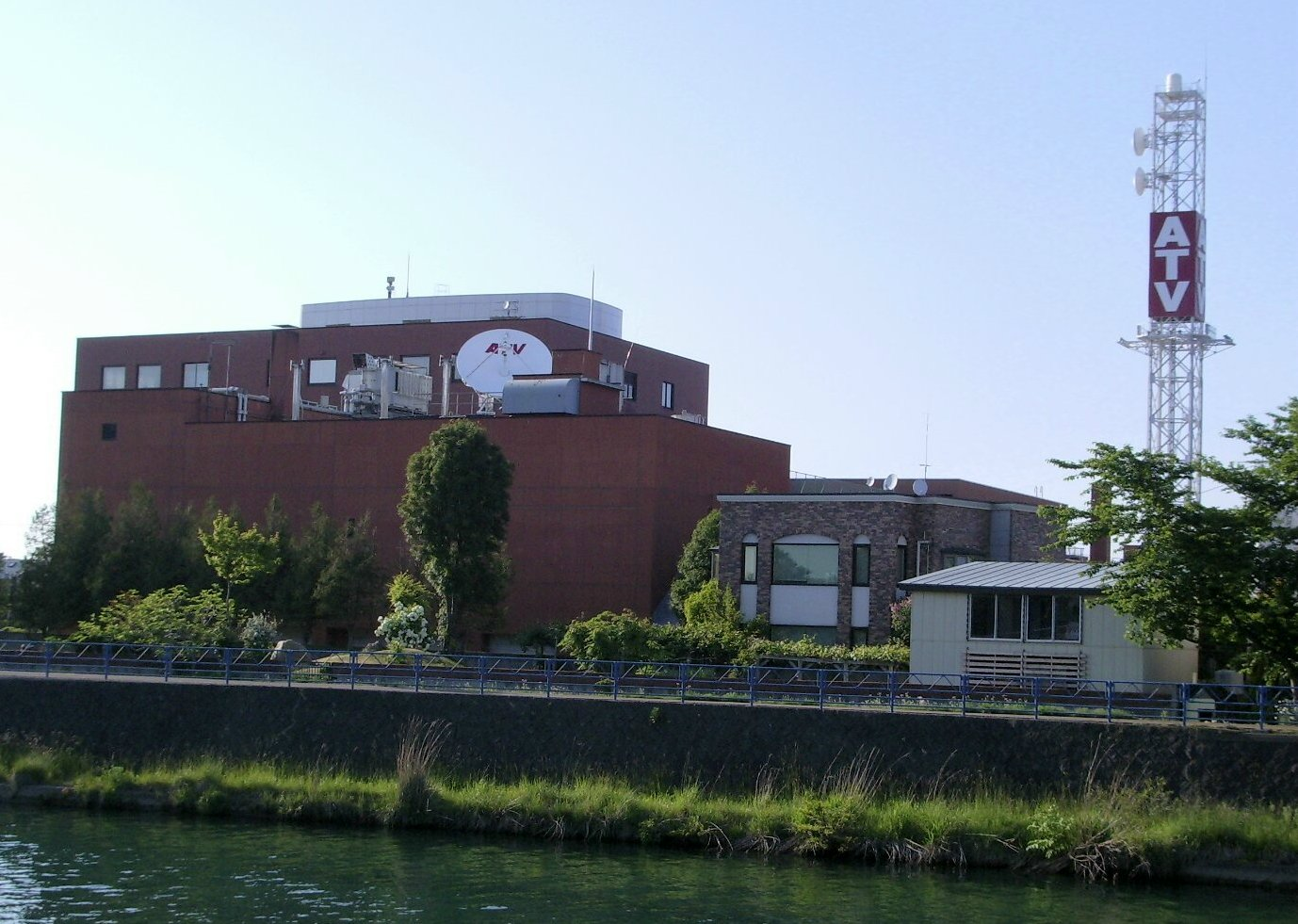
- Headquarters in Matsumori, Aomori
- Aomori Prefecture; Japan
- City: Aomori
- Channels: Digital: 30 (UHF); Virtual: 6
- Branding: Aomori Television; ATV

Programming
- Language: Japanese
- Affiliations: Japan News Network

Ownership
- Owner: Aomori Television Broadcasting Co., Ltd.

History
- Founded: December 23, 1968
- First air date: December 1, 1969
- Former call signs: JOAI-TV (1969–2011)
- Former channel numbers: 38 (analog UHF, 1969–2011)
- Former affiliations: NET/ANN (1969-1975)
- Call sign meaning: "Aomori"

Technical information
- Licensing authority: MIC

Links
- Website: www.atv.jp

Aomori Television Broadcasting Co., Ltd. (株式会社青森テレビ, Kabushiki-gaisha Aomori Terebi), also known as ATV, is a Japanese broadcast network affiliated with the Japan News Network. Their headquarters are located in Aomori Prefecture.

The broadcaster (alongside RAB) also air certain programs from Fuji TV as the prefecture doesn't have a FNN/FNS affiliate.

== History ==
The Ministry of Posts and Telecommunications announced a new plan for VHF and UHF stations in 1967, and Aomori Prefecture received an allocation. Seven companies bid for the license (including Aomori Sankei Television, Aomori Mainichi Television and Kitamon Television). Finally, in 1968, those seven companies merged into a single bid, Aomori Television, being established on December 23, 1968. Construction work began in August 1969 and the first test broadcasts started on November 1 that year.

On December 1, 1969, at 6:45am, ATV started broadcasting. At the time, existing television sets could only pick up VHF signals (NHK G, NHK E and RAB). Since TBS was the most popular commercial television station in Japan at the time, it helped increase the usage of UHF antennas to receive its signal, causing the station to establish a foothold. It reached a profit in its first year alone. In 1971, it updated its equipment to color television and finished its 50-meter antenna in its headquarters. In 1972, it concluded its first television studio with an area of 330 square meters, at the time, the largest in Tohoku. Its finances surpassed one billion yen in fiscal 1972. The station signed an international cooperation agreement with American television station KNDO, from Yakima, in 1975. That year, it had also reclaimed its position as the most watched television station in the prefecture.

According to a 1978 ratings survey, ATV had an average daily share of 20.1%, ascending to 40.4% during primetime. On April 4, 1978, its new building was completed. Between 1975 and 1979, the station was the most viewed in the prefecture for five consecutive years. On August 30, 1984, on the occasion of its fifteenth anniversary, it announced that it would move to new headquarters, the move was official on December 1. In fiscal 1990, the station's profits exceeded the 5 billion mark for the first time (5.055 billion yen). However, due to the price asset bubble and the opening of Asahi Broadcasting Aomori in 1991, the profits fell to under 5 billion. In October 1997, a three-floor building in Hachinohe was completed, which is equipped with a studio, created to increase its sales in the prefecture. That fiscal year saw ATV record 5.455 billion yen in profits. On April 30, 1998, it launched its official website and updated its master control room on June 8.。

Digital broadcasts began on 1 July 2006, while analog broadcasts ended on July 24, 2011.
