= I-Television =

Coordinates: 33°50′1.6″N 132°45′20.3″E

JOEH-DTV

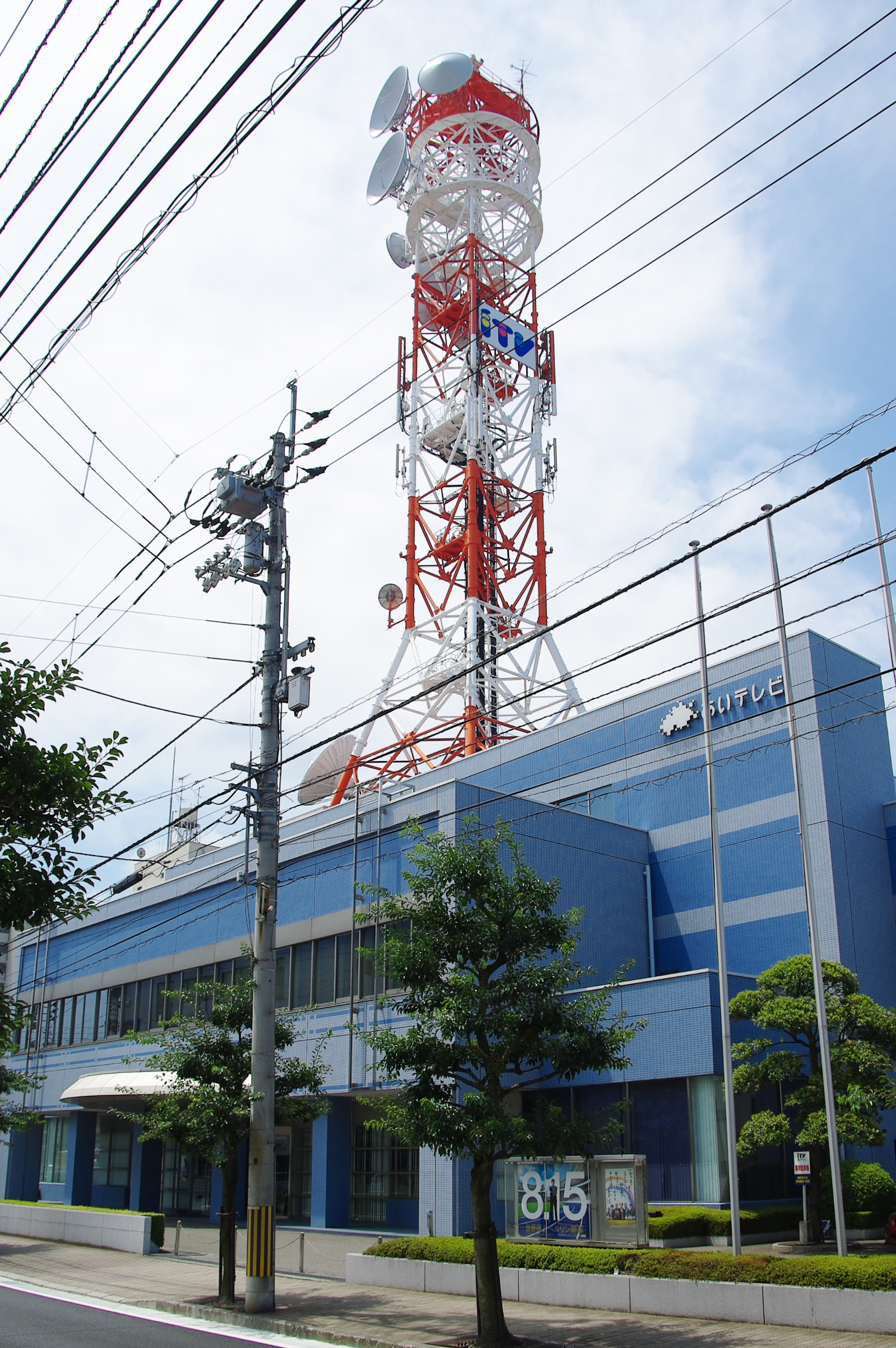
- Ehime Prefecture; Japan
- City: Matsuyama
- Channels: Digital: 21 (UHF); Virtual: 6
- Branding: i-Television i-tv

Programming
- Language: Japanese
- Affiliations: Japan News Network

Ownership
- Owner: i-Television Inc.

History
- Founded: July 3, 1991
- First air date: October 1, 1992
- Former call signs: JOEH-TV (1992–2011)
- Former channel numbers: Analog: 29 (UHF; 1992–2011)
- Call sign meaning: EH for Ehime

Technical information
- Licensing authority: MIC
- Translator(s): Niihama 49; Kawanoe 49; Uwajima 21; Iyo-Nakayama 21; Uwa-Ishiro 23; Shin-Yawatahama 47

Links
- Website: Official site

i-Television Inc. (株式会社あいテレビ, Kabushiki-gaisha i-TV), also known as itv, is a Japanese broadcast network affiliated with the JNN. Their headquarters are located in Matsuyama, Ehime Prefecture. The president is Kazuyoshi Sano.

== History ==
- 26 April 1991: License awarded
- 1 October 1992: It was set up as the third broadcasting station of Ehime Prefecture.
- 1 April 1993: Sunday Morning moves to i-TV from RNB.
- 1 October 2002: Upon celebrating its tenth anniversary, the legal name changes from Iyo TV Corporation to i-TV Corporation.
- 1 October 2006: Digital terrestrial television broadcasts commenced (Matsuyama Main Station).
- 24 July 2011: Analog transmissions end.
