= Broadcasting System of San-in =

Broadcasting System of San-in, Inc.
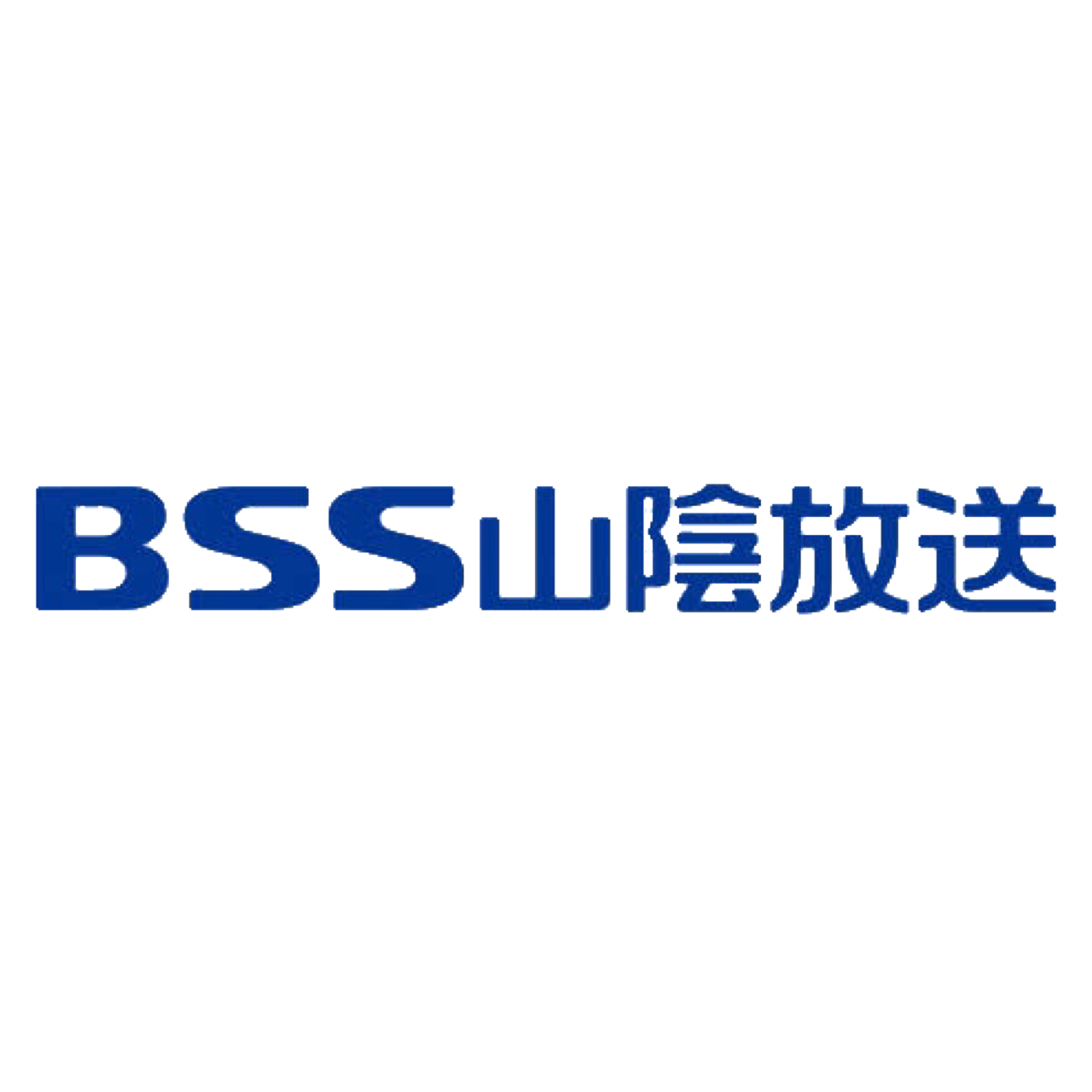
- Logo used since 1990

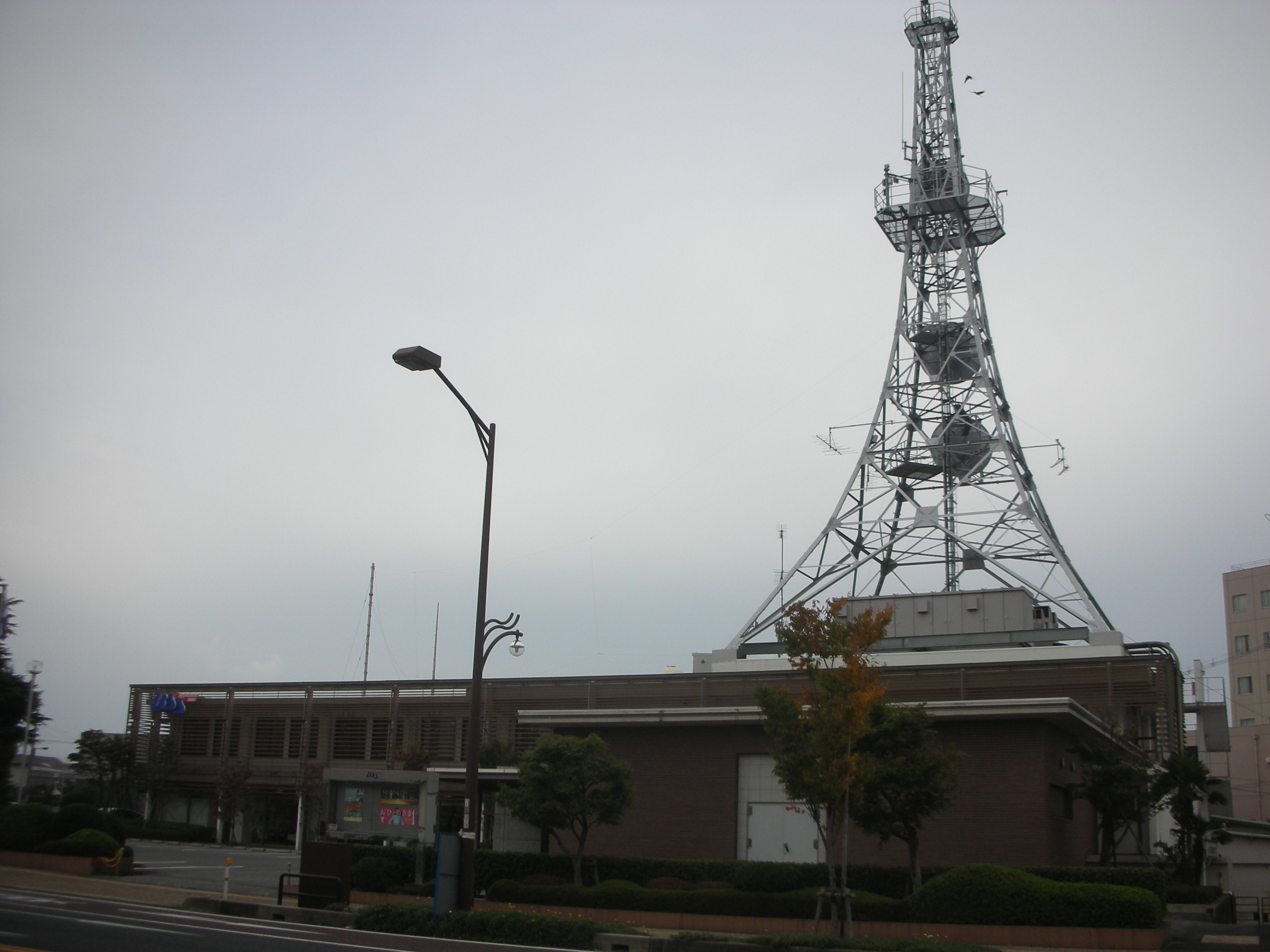
- Headquarters in Yonago, Tottori
- Native name: 株式会社山陰放送
- Romanized name: Kabushiki-gaisha San-in Hōsō
- Formerly: Radio San-in Broadcasting Co., Ltd. (1953-1961)
- Type: Private KK
- Industry: Media
- Founded: December 24, 1953; 72 years ago
- Headquarters: Nishifukubara, Yonago, Tottori, Japan
- Key people: Kibbei Sakaguchi (president and CEO)
- Services: Radio and television network
- Owner: TBS Holdings (8.46%); The Asahi Shimbun (8.46%)
- Subsidiaries: BSS Planning
- Website: www.bss.jp

JOHF
- Tottori; Japan
- Broadcast area: Tottori and Shimane
- Frequencies: 900 kHz (AM); 92.2 MHz (FM)
- Branding: BSS Radio

Programming
- Language: Japanese
- Format: Talk, Sports
- Affiliations: JRN/NRN

Ownership
- Owner: Broadcasting System of San-in, Inc.

History
- First air date: March 1, 1954; 72 years ago
- Call sign meaning: High Frequency (alludes to VHF/UHF)

Technical information
- Licensing authority: MIC
- Power: 5 kW (AM); 500W (FM)

Links
- Website: www.bss.jp/radio/

JOHF-DTV
- Tottori and Shimane; Japan
- City: Tottori
- Channels: Digital: 45 (UHF); Virtual: 6
- Branding: BSS Television; BSSテレビ

Programming
- Affiliations: Japan News Network

Ownership
- Owner: Broadcasting System of San-in, Inc.

History
- First air date: December 15, 1959; 66 years ago
- Former call signs: JOHF-TV (1959–2011)
- Former channel numbers: 10 (VHF analog, 1959–2011)

Technical information
- Licensing authority: MIC

Links
- Website: www.bss.jp/tv/

Broadcasting System of San-in, Inc. (Note: 株式会社山陰放送, Kabushiki-gaisha San-in Hōsō; BSS) is a Japanese duo of radio and television stations broadcasting in Tottori and Shimane Prefectures.

The station is affiliated with Japan Radio Network (JRN), National Radio Network (NRN) and Japan News Network (JNN).

== History ==
The predecessor company, Radio San-in Broadcasting Co., Ltd. (RSB: Radio San-in Broadcasting Co., Ltd.), was founded by Ichiro Nosaka, who majored in radio before the war and was the head of the Sakai Coast Guard communications station after the war. In response to the amendments to the Broadcasting Law and Radio Law in April 1950, his younger brother Shinzo (father of the former Yonago Mayor Yasuo Saka), a radio engineer, made full-fledged plans to open a radio station, which had been under consideration until then. Yasuhisa Nosaka, the father of both of the brothers and a prominent local figure who served as a member of the Yonago City Council even before the war, agreed with their idea, and the three of them drew up an application for establishment, and the local business community With the cooperation of Yonago Shinkin Bank chairman Kisaburo Aoto (at the time), who was a good understanding of Yasuhisa, he supported Heibei Sakaguchi (2nd), Choemon Ta (23rd), and Yonehara. Shozo and others participated as promoters, and Hideyuki Miyoshi became the representative and submitted the application in December 1952. The following year, in September 1953, it was granted a preliminary license.

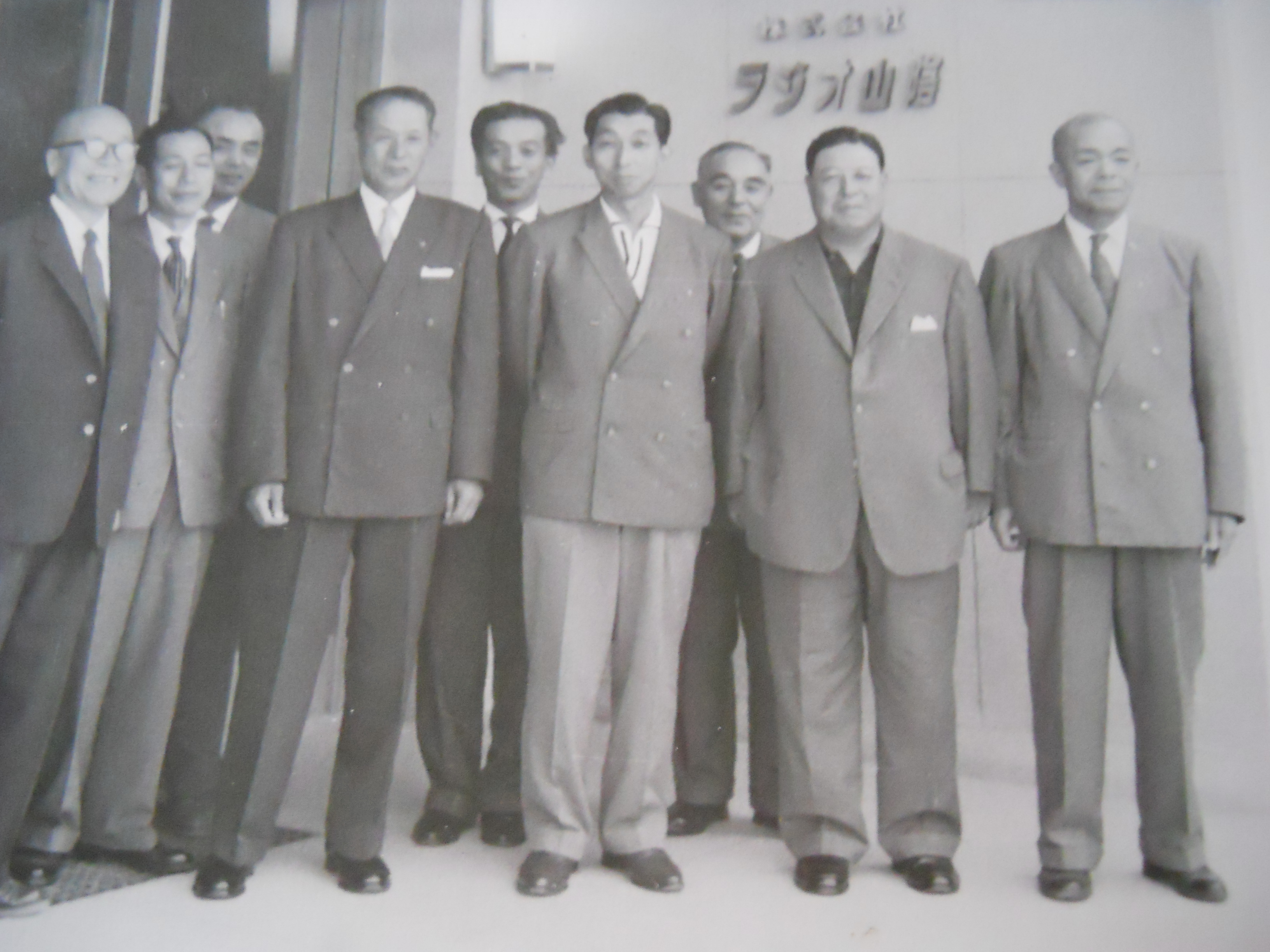
From the right: Yasuhisa Nosaka, Heibei Sakaguchi (2nd generation), Kisaburo Aoto, Prince Takamatsunomiya Norihito, Noboru Aoto, Oda Osamu, Ichiro Nosaka, Sadayoshi Isaka, Kanji Nosaka (1954, launch of Radio San-in)

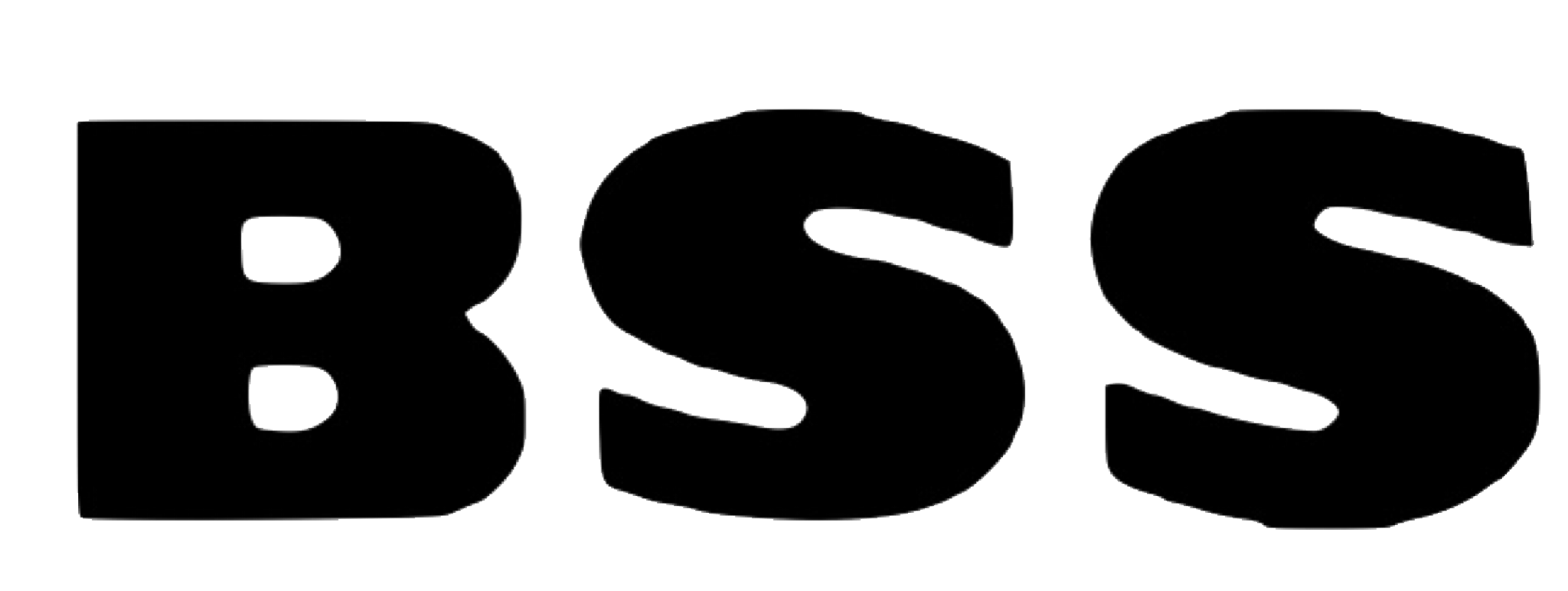
First logo of the BSS (1961–1990)

As stated in Yasuo's reminiscences, the office building at the time of its opening was located on the second floor of the Oyasu Building in Yonago City. There was a pachinko parlor on the first floor. The entrance was also shared with a pachinko parlor, and employees and performers had to pass through the pachinko machines that were open. The studio reportedly struggled with soundproofing to prevent the noise from the pachinko machines. For this reason, at the time of its opening, it was nicknames Pachinko Broadcasting Station. In addition, the transmitting station was rented out at the facilities of NTT.

After that, its television broadcasts started on December 15, 1959, and changed the company name to San-in Broadcasting Co., Ltd. (abbreviation BSS: Broadcasting System of San-in Inc.) on June 1, 1961.
