= TV Kochi =

JORI-DTV
- Logo used since 1995

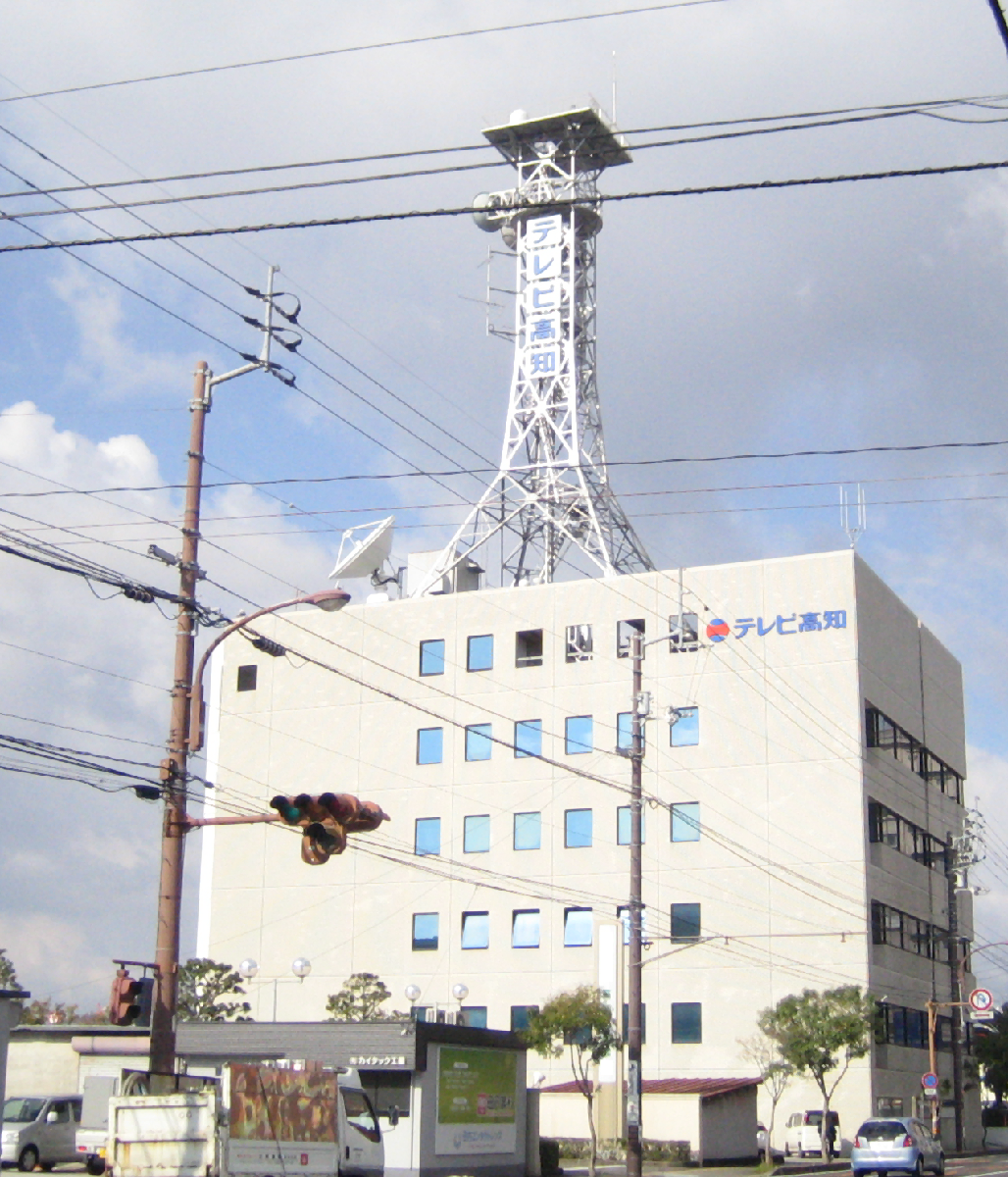
- Headquarters in Kitahonmachi, Kochi

Kōchi Prefecture; Japan
- City: Kōchi
- Channels: Digital: 19 (UHF); Virtual: 6
- Branding: TV Kochi; KUTV

Programming
- Language: Japanese
- Affiliations: Japan News Network

Ownership
- Owner: TV Kochi Broadcasting Co., Ltd.

History
- Founded: April 8, 1969
- First air date: April 1, 1970
- Former call signs: JORI-TV (1970-2011)
- Former channel numbers: Analog: 38 (UHF, 1970-2011)

Technical information
- Licensing authority: MIC

Links
- Website: https://www.kutv.co.jp/

TV Kochi Broadcasting (テレビ高知, Terebi Kōchi), also known as KUTV (Kochi UHF TeleVision), is a television network headquartered in Kōchi Prefecture, Japan. It is affiliated with the Japan News Network. TV Kochi founded in 1969, and started broadcasting in 1970.

== History ==
KUTV was established in 1969 and initially planned to join the Japan News Network as a charter affiliate. NTV affiliate Kochi Broadcasting started JNN's news bulletins in the morning ahead of the station's launch. This led to a period of indecision where the station almost became a charter affiliate of the Fuji News Network and Fuji Network System, with RKC likely joining JNN. A proposal was made in January 1970, but TBS rejected it under the grounds that it was planning an affiliation with the new station instead.

KUTV started digital terrestrial television broadcasting in 2006, and ended analog television broadcasting in 2011. In 2015, KUTV re-built its headquarter building.
