= Minaminihon Broadcasting =

Japanese radio and television station

Minaminihon Broadcasting Co., Ltd.
- Logo used since 1983

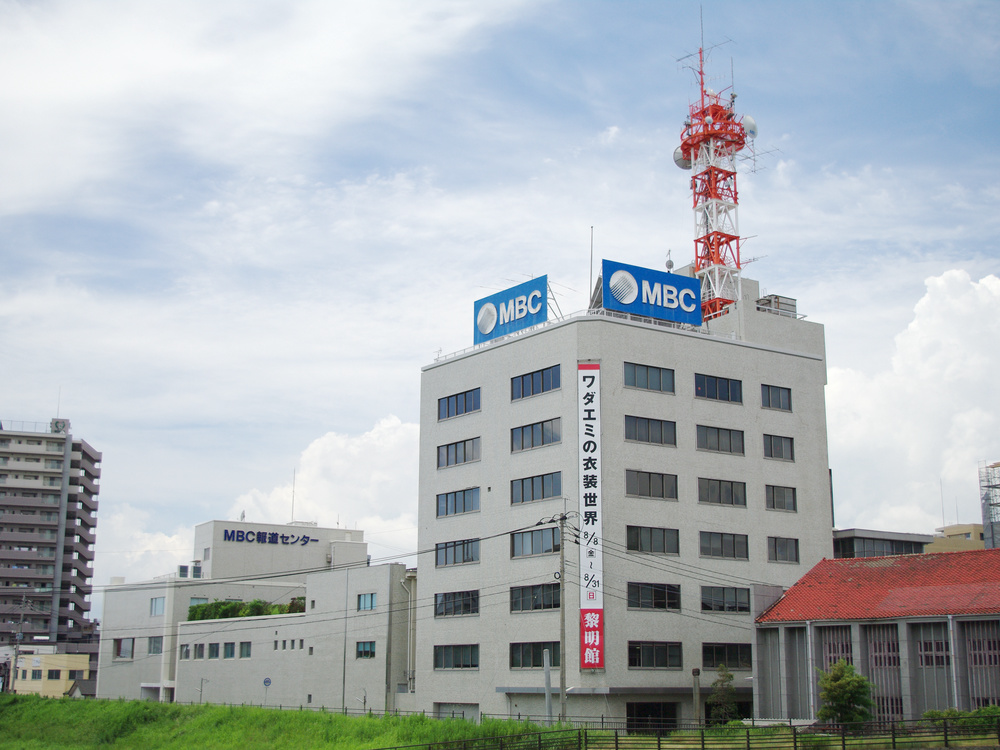
- Headuarters in Korai-cho, Kagoshima
- Native name: 株式会社 南日本放送
- Romanized name: Kabushikigaisha Minaminihonhōsō
- Type: Kabushiki gaisha
- Founded: June 23, 1953; 73 years ago
- Headquarters: 5–25 Korai-cho, Kagoshima City, Kagoshima Prefecture, Japan
- Website: www.mbc.co.jp
- Footnotes; Data from its Corporate Profile

JOCF
- Kagoshima; Japan
- Broadcast area: Kagoshima Prefecture
- Frequencies: 1107 kHz (AM); 92.8 MHz (FM)
- Branding: MBC Radio

Programming
- Language: Japanese
- Affiliations: JRN, NRN

History
- First air date: October 10, 1953

Technical information
- Licensing authority: MIC
- Power: 20 kW

Links
- Website: https://www.mbc.co.jp/radio/

JOCF-DTV
- Kagoshima Prefecture; Japan
- City: Kagoshima
- Channels: Digital: 40 (UHF); Virtual: 1
- Branding: MBC Television

Programming
- Language: Japanese
- Affiliations: Japan News Network

Ownership
- Owner: Minaminihon Broadcasting Co., Ltd.

History
- First air date: April 1, 1959
- Former call signs: JOCF-TV (1959–2011)
- Former channel numbers: 1 (analog VHF, 1959–2011)

Technical information
- Licensing authority: MIC

Links
- Website: https://www.mbc.co.jp/tv/

Minaminihon Broadcasting Co., Ltd. (Japanese: 株式会社南日本放送), also known as MBC, is a Japanese radio and television station. It founded in 1953 and headquartered in Kagoshima, Japan. Minaminihon Broadcasting commences radio broadcasting in 1953. In 1959, Minaminihon Broadcasting started television broadcasting.

Minaminihon Broadcasting is affiliated with the JNN (TV), JRN, NRN (Radio). It is the only commercial broadcasting that provides both TV and radio services in Kagoshima prefecture. In 2006, MBC started digital terrestrial television broadcasting. MBC Television is one of 3 JNN affiliates broadcasting on virtual channel "1", with the other 2 being Tohoku Broadcasting, and core JNN station Hokkaido Broadcasting.

== History ==
On December 12, 1952, the then president of Minaminihon Shimbun, Yoshitaka Hatakata, proposed the idea of setting up a private broadcast in Kagoshima Prefecture. The original plan for its station was to have a transmission power of 3,000 watts, with which it could cover the whole of mainland Kagoshima Prefecture, the southern part of Kumamoto and Miyazaki Prefectures, and the south-western Kagoshima Islands.As plans for the new broadcaster were known to the public, there were initial opposition from the then governor of Kagoshima Prefecture, Shigenari Tadasu, and local investors, as they believed there's no need to establish a private broadcaster in the prefecture. After Hatakata convinced the prefectural government and local investors to establish a private broadcaster, that decision was reversed.On January 31, 1953, Radio Minaminihon held its first general meeting, in which local investors from the prefecture participated.To allow the Amami Islands (which were under US rule at the time) to receive broadcast signals from mainland Japan, Radio Minaminihon was permitted to transmit at 3,000 watts, the only broadcaster at that time in Japan to transmit at that rate.

In order to get more commercial revenue, Radio Minaminihon moved up the launch date from the originally scheduled November 1, 1953. At 5:30 in the morning of October 10, Radio Minaminihon officially began to broadcast programs, becoming the first private radio station in Kagoshima Prefecture. The station held a public collection of social songs when it started broadcasting, which increased the company's popularity. On November 1, Radio Minaminihon moved into its headquarters in Yiju Town. On the same day, Radio Minaminihon also opened branches in Tokyo, Osaka, and Fukuoka to strengthen advertising sales activities. In December of the same year, Radio Minaminihon broadcast live the ceremony where the United States returned the sovereignty of the Amami Islands to Japan. In 1958, Radio Minaminihon's operating income exceeded 200 million yen.

In February 1956, Radio Minaminihon submitted an application for a television broadcast license to the Ministry of Posts, and obtained a television broadcast license on October 22, 1957. On November 1, 1958, Radio Minaminihon started construction in Koryo Town, Kagoshima City and it was completed on January 29 of the following year. At 8:45 in the morning on April 1, 1959, Radio Minaminihon officially began to broadcast TV programs. After the launch, the TV division joined the JNN network. A year later, Minaminihon Radio TV began to broadcast TV programs during the day. At the same time, the number of television sets in Kagoshima Prefecture also increased from 5,520 at the beginning of broadcasting to 16,000 in 1960. Radio Minaminihon's TV division also quickly captured most of Kagoshima's high-rated programs, and its advertising revenue surpassed that of the broadcast division in just one year. In October 1961, Radio Minaminihon changed its company name to Minaminihon Broadcasting, but continued to use the English abbreviation "MBC", and launched a new logo while changing the company name. In 1962, MBC's TV department revenue increased by 40.6% compared to the previous year. In 1964, MBC broadcast 17 hours of TV programs every day. At that time, 53.57% of the programs broadcast were from the network, 39.29% were videotaped programs, and 7.14% were self-made programs.

On December 1, 1957, the Radio Minaminihon Union was established. On March 21, 1962, because the management failed to meet the union's demand for a salary increase, the Minaminihon Broadcasting Union went on strike for 5 hours on March 21, suspending all programs. However, because there was no compromise between the two after the strike, the trade union launched a three-day strike on March 25, and finally the strike ended with a partial compromise from the management.

On July 7, 1966, MBC broadcast a color TV program for the first time. At that time, Minaminihon Broadcasting only broadcast 2.5 hours of color programs every week. In 1969, with the launch of Kagoshima TV, some of the TV programs broadcast by MBC moved to Kagoshima TV. At the same time, the advertising revenue was also affected by the emergence of competitors. In 1972, MBC fully rebroadcast that year's National Sports Festival held in Kagoshima Prefecture, and assisted in organizing the 20th Japan Private Broadcasting Conference. The sense of presence in the Japanese broadcasting industry was also greatly enhanced by these two activities. According to the ratings survey conducted jointly by South Nippon Broadcasting and Kagoshima TV in 1971, Minaminihon Broadcasting accounted for 56.5% of the average daily ratings in Kagoshima Prefecture at that time (25% for NHK and 19.8% for Kagoshima TV), with an overwhelming advantage.

In 1973, for its 20th anniversary, Minaminihon Broadcasting was stimulated by the large-scale expositions that were popular all over Japan at that time, and planned to hold the "Sun Expo" event at a cost of 5 billion yen. But due to the impact of the first oil crisis, the plan was shelved. But four years later, in 1977, to commemorate the 100th anniversary of Saigo Takamori's death, Minaminihon Broadcasting held the "Onishigo Expo", which attracted more than 400,000 people to visit. On January 28 of the same year, Minaminihon Broadcasting set up a relay station in Naze, Amami Oshima, so that Amami Oshima could also watch programs from private TV stations. In 1975, Minaminihon Broadcasting launched a new logo.

In 1982, Kagoshima Broadcasting, the third private TV station in Kagoshima Prefecture, started broadcasting. MBC directly participated in the preparations for its launch. Although the two are competitors, they also have a relationship of brother stations. In the same year, MBC began broadcasting stereo programs. In 1983, on the occasion of the 30th anniversary of its launch, Minaminihon Broadcasting launched the current logo designed by Kazumasa Nagai, the logo designer of the 1972 Sapporo Winter Olympics and the Okinawa International Ocean Exposition. In 1990, Minaminihon Broadcasting signed a sister station contract with South Korea's Jeonju MBC and America's WXIA-TV to strengthen international cooperation. During the "August 6 Flood" in 1993, Minaminihon Broadcasting interrupted programming sent from TBS due to flood occurring at its headquarters and broadcast a special news program to report the latest developments in the flood, which was affirmed by the JNN Award.

In 1996, MBC opened its official website. In 2001, MBC held two large-scale exhibitions, the Super Ancient Civilization Exhibition and the Mayan Civilization Exhibition, which attracted nearly 100,000 people to visit and successfully developed income other than advertising. On the occasion of the 50th anniversary of the launch in 2003, MBC once again held the Mayan Civilization Exhibition, and produced a series of special programs on both radio and television. On December 1, 2006, Minaminihon Broadcasting began broadcasting digital TV signals, and stopped broadcasting analog TV signals on July 24, 2011. From 2016 to 2018, Minaminihon Broadcasting won the triple crown in ratings for three consecutive years, and it is the only TV station on the JNN network that has won the triple crown for three consecutive years. In 2022, Minaminihon Broadcasting introduced a virtual talent named Minami, who's responsible in the narration of the programs aired on MBC Television. In 2023, Minaminihon Broadcasting celebrated its 70th anniversary of its establishment as a radio and television company.

As part of its plans to transition to a full-fledged FM station by 2028, Minaminihon Broadcasting shuts down its AM relay operations in Akune, Oguchi, and Kawauchi (all at 1107 kHz) on February 1st, 2024. Currently, the affected areas are being served by the MBC Akune Wide FM Relay at 93.7 MHz, as well as the Makurazaki (94.8 MHz), and the Kanoya (94.2 MHz) Wide FM Relays. Currently, The main Kagoshima AM station (Hayato Transmitter Station, JOCF, 1107 kHz), and the Naze AM relay (1449 kHz) were the only ones left that are active, with MBC planning to shut down all AM operations within or before 2028.
