= UHF Television Yamanashi =

JOGI-DTV
- Logo used since 2019

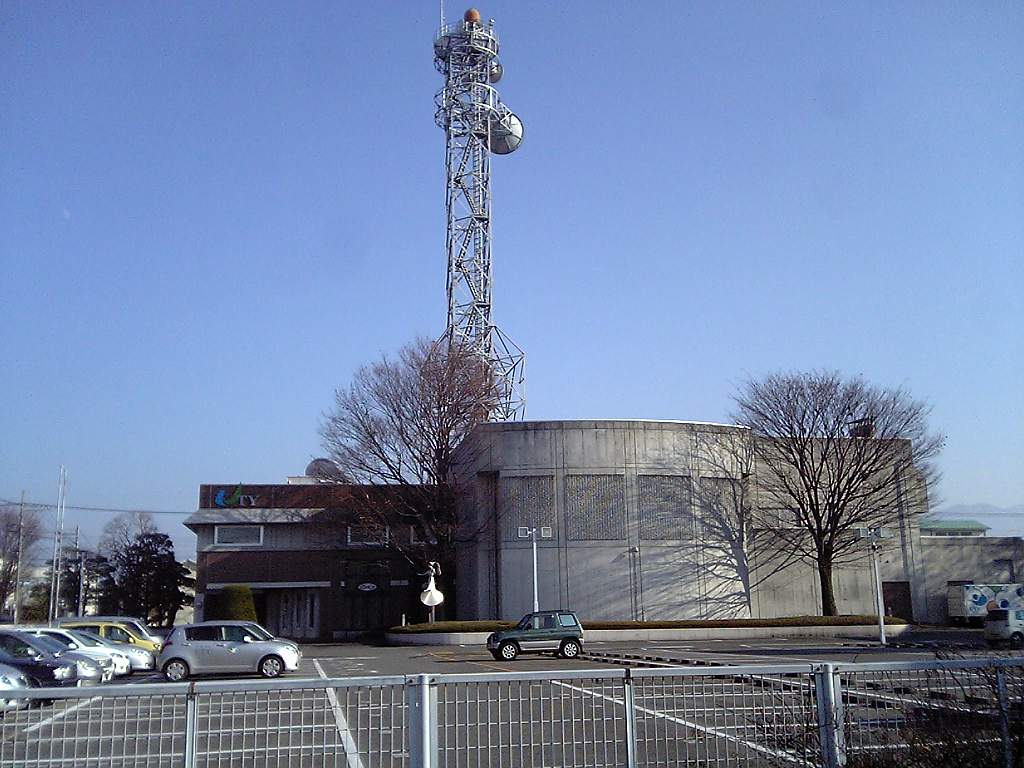
- Headquarters in Yuda, Kōfu
- Yamanashi Prefecture; Japan
- City: Kōfu
- Channels: Digital: 27 (UHF); Virtual: 6
- Branding: Television Yamanashi; UTY

Programming
- Language: Japanese
- Affiliations: Japan News Network

Ownership
- Owner: Television Yamanashi Co., Ltd.

History
- Founded: February 8, 1969
- First air date: April 1, 1970
- Former call signs: JOGI-TV (1970–2011)
- Former channel numbers: 37 (analog UHF, 1970–2011)

Technical information
- Licensing authority: MIC

Links
- Website: www.uty.co.jp

Television Yamanashi Co., Ltd. (株式会社テレビ山梨, Kabushiki-gaisha TV Yamanashi), also known as UTY, is a Japanese broadcast network affiliated with the JNN. Its headquarters are located in Kōfu, Yamanashi.

== History ==
Television Yamanashi was established on 1 April 1970 as the second broadcasting station located in Yamanashi Prefecture. A new studio and head office was completed on 1 August 1984. Digital terrestrial television broadcasts started in July 2006. All analog broadcasting were discontinued on 24 July 2011.
