= Nihonkai Telecasting =

Television station in Tottori Prefecture, Japan

JOJX-DTV
- Logo used since 2018

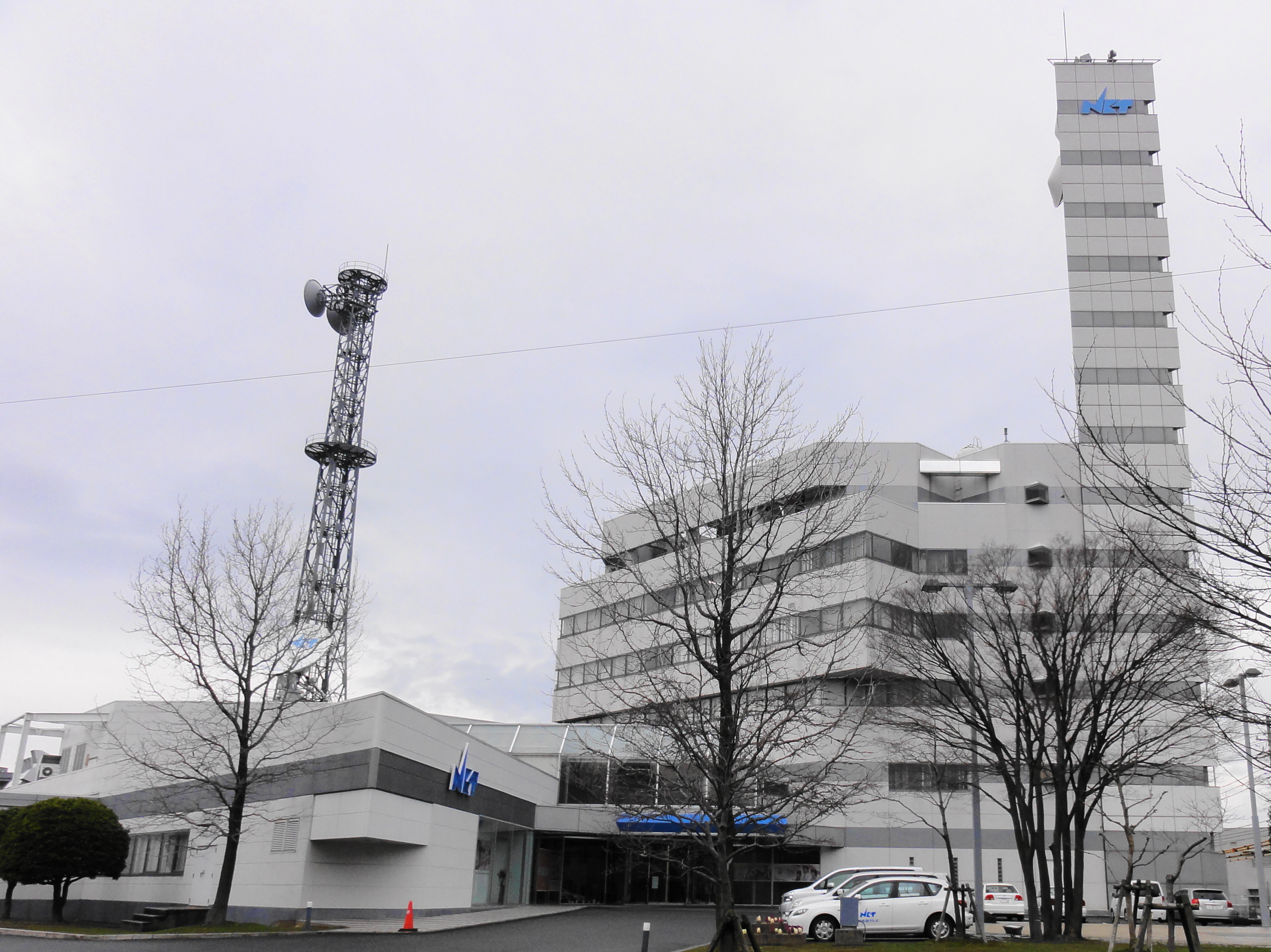
- Headquarters in Denencho, Tottori
- Tottori and Shimane; Japan
- City: Tottori
- Channels: Digital: 38 (UHF); Virtual: 1
- Branding: NKT; Nihonkai Telecasting

Programming
- Language: Japanese
- Affiliations: Nippon News Network and Nippon Television Network System

Ownership
- Owner: Nihonkai Telecasting Co., Ltd.

History
- First air date: May 3, 1959
- Former call signs: JOJX-TV (1959–2011)
- Former channel numbers: Analog: 1 (VHF, 1959–2011)

Technical information
- Licensing authority: MIC

Links
- Website: www.nkt-tv.co.jp

Corporate information
- Company
- Native name: 日本海テレビジョン放送株式会社
- Romanized name: Nihonkai Terebijon Hōsō kabushiki gaisha
- Type: Kabushiki gaisha
- Industry: Television broadcasting
- Founded: March 3, 1958
- Headquarters: 4-360 Denencho, Tottori City, Tottori Prefecture, Japan
- Key people: Akiya Taguchi (President and CEO)
- Owner: The Yomiuri Shimbun Holdings (8.20%); Nippon Television Holdings (8.00%)
- Footnotes; Data from its Company Profile

Nihonkai Telecasting Co., Ltd. (日本海テレビジョン放送株式会社, Nihonkai Terebijon Hōsō kabushiki gaisha; NKT) is a Japanese TV station broadcast in Tottori Prefecture and Shimane Prefecture. NKT is a TV station of Nippon News Network (NNN) and Nippon Television Network System (NNS).

== History ==
In 1957, the Sankei Shimbun intended to apply for the establishment of a private TV station in Tottori Prefecture, and obtained the support of the local financial circles. On February 9 of the same year, Tottori Television held the first sponsor meeting. At the fifth sponsor meeting on November 18 of the same year, Tottori TV was renamed Nihonkai TV. On March 3 of the following year, Nihonkai TV held a founding meeting and formally established the company. When the broadcast started, the headquarters of Nihonkai TV was located on the 4th and 5th floors of the Tottori Chamber of Commerce and Industry. In 1958, during the preparatory period, Nihonkai TV built staff residences.

At 16:30 on March 3, 1959, Nihonkai TV officially started broadcasting, becoming the second private TV station in Chugoku after Sanyo Broadcasting, and also the first private TV station in Sanin. At the beginning of the broadcast, Nihonkai TV mainly broadcast programs from Radio Tokyo TV, but with the launch of Sanin Broadcasting at the end of the year, Nihonkai TV switched its source to Nippon TV and Fuji TV. After that, the proportion of NTV stations gradually increased. In 1961, the Nihonkai TV Union was established. In 1963, Nihonkai TV set up the Yonago relay station, enabling the western part of Tottori Prefecture to receive the station.

On March 20, 1966, Nihonkai TV Station began to broadcast color TV programs, becoming the first TV station in San'in to broadcast color TV. Four years later, in 1970, Nihonkai TV's self-made local news was first broadcast in color. In 1972, Nihonkai TV launched a new logo designed by designer Yasuhisa Iguchi through public solicitation. In the same year, Nihonkai TV set up a branch in Shimane Prefecture, in connection with the decision taken to merge the TV broadcasting markets of Tottori and Shimane as one. According to the audience rating survey conducted by Video Research in April 1973, Nihonkai TV ranked first in both Tottori City and Matsue City. In 1978, the Nihonkai TV Matsue Building was completed. The building is 8 stories high, and part of the space is leased to other companies. In 1987, Nihonkai TV further upgraded the Matsue branch to the Matsue head office, establishing a dual head office system. Most of the TV Asahi programs moved to BSS in 1989.

In 1991, NKT began to implement the two-day weekend system. In May of the same year, Nihonkai TV built a new headquarter building. The new headquarters was completed in September of the following year. In December of the same year, Nihonkai TV moved into the new headquarters to broadcast its signals. In 1996, Nihonkai TV won the triple crown of ratings for the first time. In August 2000, Nihonkai TV opened its official website.

In order to meet the hardware requirements required for digital TV, Nihonkai TV built a new iron tower in 2003 to transmit digital TV signals. On October 1, 2006, Nihonkai TV began broadcasting digital TV signals, initially covering 53% of Tottori and Shimane prefectures. In 2007, this figure increased to 78%. On July 24, 2011, NKT stopped broadcasting analog TV signals. On September 1, 2018, Nihonkai TV launched a new logo.
