= TV-U Yamagata =

JOWI-DTV

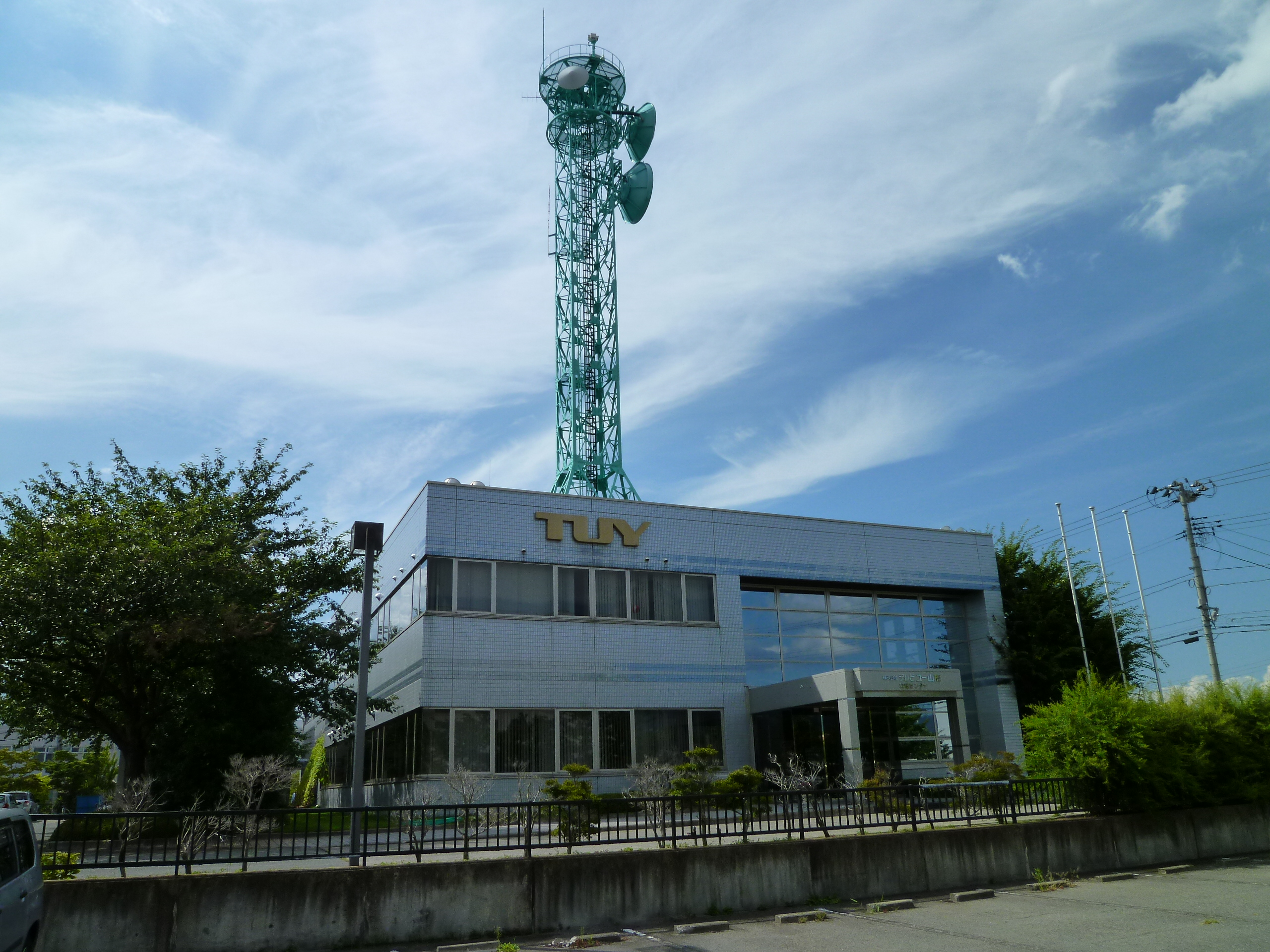
- Yamagata Prefecture; Japan
- City: Sakata
- Channels: Digital: 20 (UHF); Virtual: 6
- Branding: TUY; TV-U Yamagata

Programming
- Language: Japanese
- Affiliations: Japan News Network

Ownership
- Owner: TV-U Yamagata Inc.

History
- First air date: October 1, 1989
- Former call signs: JOWI-TV (1989-2011)
- Former channel numbers: Analog: 36 (UHF, 1989-2011)

Technical information
- Licensing authority: MIC

Links
- Website: www.tuy.co.jp

TV-U Yamagata (Japanese: テレビユー山形, Hepburn: Terebi Yu Yamagata), also known as TUY, is a television network headquartered in Yamagata Prefecture, Japan. TUY is the third commercial television broadcaster in Yamagata Prefecture; it started broadcasting in 1989. TUY is affiliated with JNN. TBS Holdings is the biggest shareholder of TUY, holding 18% of TUY's stock share.

In December 2005, TUY started broadcasting digital terrestrial television.
