= Tulip Television =

Tulip-TV, Inc.

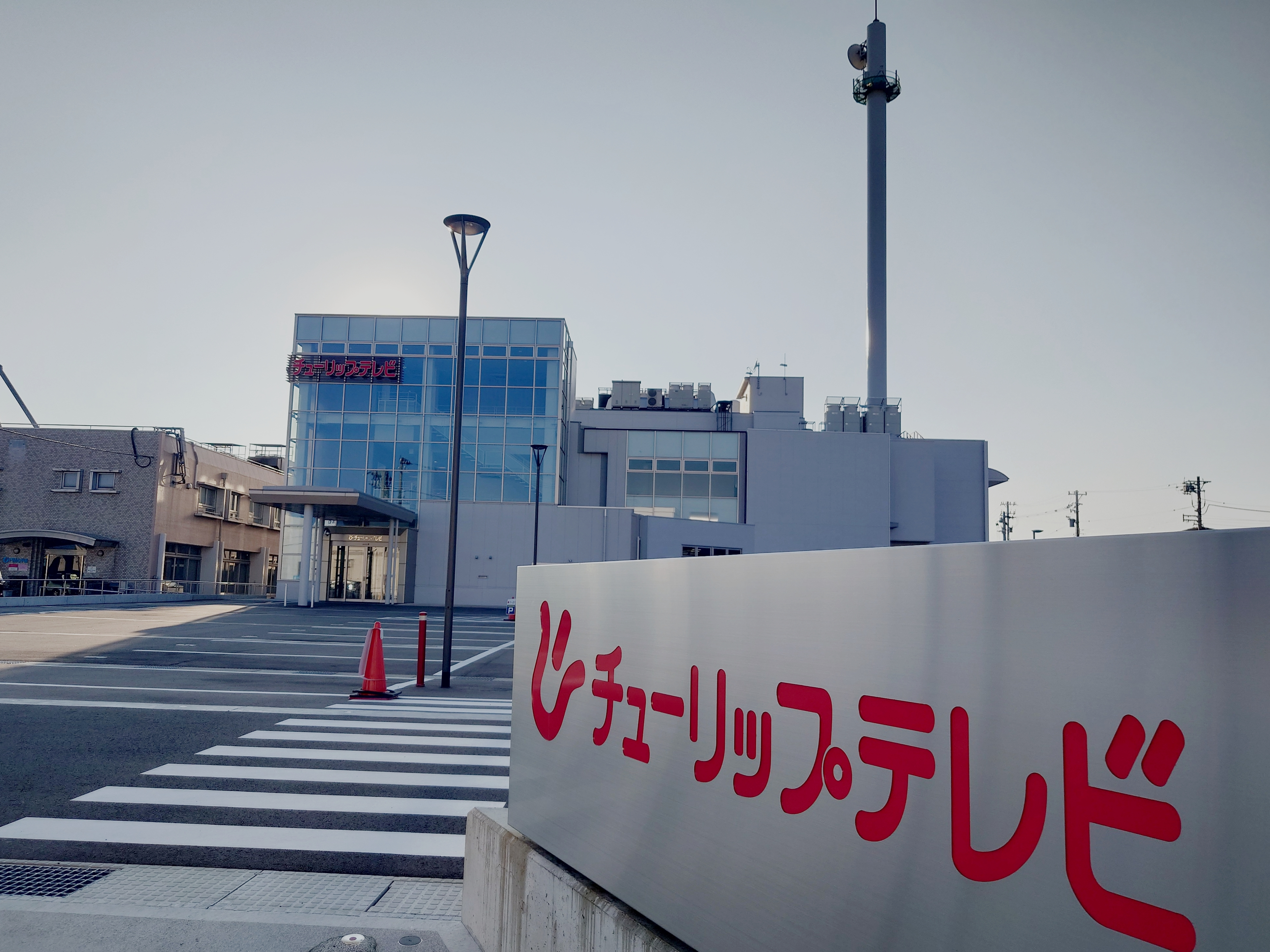
- Headquarters in Honmachi, Toyama City
- Native name: 株式会社チューリップテレビ
- Romanized name: Kabushikigaisha Chūrippu Terebi
- Type: Business corporation
- Industry: Television network
- Founded: 21 November 1989; 36 years ago
- Headquarters: 8-24 Okuda Honmachi, Toyama City, Toyama Prefecture, Japan,
- Key people: Masamichi Yamano (President and CEO)
- Owner: Sankyo Tateyama (12.5%); Intec (12.25%); TBS Holdings (11%)

JOJH-DTV
- Toyama Prefecture; Japan
- City: Toyama
- Channels: Digital: 22 (UHF); Virtual: 6
- Branding: TulipTelevision

Programming
- Language: Japanese
- Affiliations: Japan News Network

Ownership
- Owner: Tulip-TV, Inc.

History
- First air date: 1 October 1990
- Former call signs: JOJH-TV (1990-2011)
- Former channel numbers: Analog: 32 (UHF, 1990–2011)

Technical information
- Licensing authority: MIC
- Transmitter coordinates: 36°42′0.18″N 137°10′2.93″E
- Repeaters: 47 Takaoka; 22 Himi; 21 Nanto; 51 Kurobe

Links
- Website: www.tulip-tv.co.jp

JOJH-DTV (channel 6) is a Japanese television station serving as an affiliate of the Japan News Network (JNN) for Toyama Prefecture. Based in Toyama, the station is owned-and-operated by Tulip-TV, Inc. (Note: 株式会社チューリップテレビ, Kabushikigaisha Chūrippu Terebi; TUT). When the station signed on in 1990, it was originally located in Takaoka until 2022, when it moved to its current location.
