= Takuya Mizoguchi =

Japanese actor (born 1995)

- 溝口 琢矢
- Born: 9 May 1995 (age 31); Tokyo, Japan
- Occupation: Actor
- Years active: 2007–present
- Notable work: Ki: Kill; Kamen Rider × Kamen Rider × Kamen Rider The Movie: Cho-Den-O Trilogy
- Television: Tenchijin; Kamen Rider Ghost
- Height: 172 cm (5 ft 8 in)
- Website: Amuse profile

Takuya Mizoguchi (溝口 琢矢, Mizoguchi Takuya; born 9 May 1995, in Tokyo) is a Japanese actor. Mizoguchi is also a member of the 5-dimensional idol group DearDream from DreamFes!

== Biography ==
- Mizoguchi made his acting debut in 2007. His appearance in the film Kamen Rider Den-O: I'm Born! published in the same year he played the rider Mini Den-O and the young Kotaro, and it became a topic when he was twelve years old.
- In the Cho Den-O series that was deployed in 2009 and 2010 as the successor series of Den-O, rather than Takeru Satoh, Mizoguchi played the role of Ryotaro Nogami.

== Filmography ==
=== TV dramas ===
| Year | Title | Role | Network | Ref. |
|---|---|---|---|---|
| 2007 | Minatochō Ninjō Nurse | Yuki Misawa | TV Tokyo | |
| 2007 | First Kiss | | Fuji TV | |
| 2008 | Miraikōshi meguru | Masaya Yamauchi | TV Asahi | |
| 2008 | Inochi no iro enpitsu | Shinji Kawagoe | TV Asahi | |
| 2008 | Gakkō ja Oshierarenai! | Ryota Wakagi | NTV | |
| 2009 | Tenchijin | Nagao Kihei (Uesugi Kagekatsu's early childhood) | NHK | |
| 2009 | Kamen Rider Decade | Ryotaro Nogami | TV Asahi | |
| 2011 | AIBOU: Tokyo Detective Duo: Season 9 | Yuta Fujiyoshi | TV Asahi | |
| 2012 | Jiken | Shun Nakai | TV Asahi | |
| 2015 | Gin no Spoon | Yu Wakatsuki | THK | |
| 2015 | Kamen Rider Ghost | Shibuya Hachioji, Tetsuya Hachioji | TV Asahi | |
| 2018 | Kamen Rider Zi-O | Shibuya Hachioji | TV Asahi | |

=== Variety ===
| Year | Title | Network |
|---|---|---|
| 2014 | Omokuri Kantoku: O-Creator's TV show | Fuji TV |

=== Mobile drama ===
| Year | Title | Role | Network | Ref. |
|---|---|---|---|---|
| 2015 | Sanshokudonburi, meshiagare | Bunta Setonuchi | NotTV | |

=== Films ===
| Year | Title | Role | Ref |
|---|---|---|---|
| 2007 | Kamen Rider Den-O: I'm Born! | Kotaro (Ryotaro Nogami at the age of ten) | |
| 2007 | Sukiyaki Western Django | | |
| 2008 | Kill: Kodomo Samurai | Ryutaro | |
| 2009 | Cho Kamen Rider Den-O & Decade Neo Generations: The Onigashima Warship | Ryotaro Nogami / Kamen Rider Den-O | |
| 2010 | Kamen Rider × Kamen Rider × Kamen Rider The Movie: Cho-Den-O Trilogy | Ryotaro Nogami / Kamen Rider Den-O | |
| 2011 | Ninja Kids!!! | Takamaru Saito | |
| 2012 | Joker Game | Keiichi Asano | |
| 2015 | Kamen Rider × Kamen Rider Ghost & Drive: Super Movie War Genesis | Shibuya Hachoji | |
| 2016 | Kamen Rider 1 | Shibuya Hachoji | |
| 2016 | Kamen Rider Ghost: The 100 Eyecons and Ghost's Fated Moment | Shibuya Hachoji | |
| 2016 | Kamen Rider Heisei Generations: Dr. Pac-Man vs. Ex-Aid & Ghost with Legend Rider | Shibuya Hachoji | |
| 2022 | Dreaming of the Meridian Arc | | |

=== Stage ===
| Year | Title | Role | Ref. |
|---|---|---|---|
| 2013 | Frogs | Teru | |
| 2013 | Frogs Special Kōen | Gobun | |
| 2014 | Miagereba ano Ni to Onaji Sora | Shoten Watanabe | |
| 2014 | History Boys | | |
| 2015 | Here Comes the Bride, My Mom! | Hachi | |
| 2015 | Ore to Sekai wa Onaji Basho ni aru | Pon | |
| 2017 | Here Comes the Bride, My Mom! | Hachi | |
| 2017 | Overling Gift | | |
| 2025 | World Trigger B-Rank Wars Final Match | Osamu Mikumo | |

=== Events ===
| Year | Title | Ref. |
|---|---|---|
| 2013 | Amuse Presents Super Handsome Live 2013 | |
| 2014 | Drama Sanshokudonburi, meshiagare Dai 1-wa Senkō Shisha-kai –Cast to Issho ni Drama no Sekai e– | |
| 2014 | Amuse Presents Super Handsome Live 2014 | |
| 2015 | Ikebukuro Jūdan! Card Rally Event "Miracle Greeting 01" | |
| 2015 | Fukushū DVD Hatsubai Kinen Senkō Jōei-kai | |
| 2016 | Chō Eiyū-sai Kamen Rider × Super Sentai Live & Show 2016 | |
| 2016 | Anime Japan 2016 | |
| 2016 | DearDream Debut Single "New Star Evolution" Hatsubai Kinen Event | |
| 2016 | Kamen Rider Ghost Special Event "Daitenku Temple Night" | |
| 2016 | DreFes! Fan Meeting 01 –Ōen de Kanaeru 1st Stage!– | |
| 2016 | TV Asahi Robbongi Hills Natsu Matsuri Summer Station "Natsu Eiga Special Event Talk Show & Shudaika Live" | |
| 2016 | Anime DreFes! –Ōen o Todokeru Jōei-kai– | |
| 2016 | Anime DreFes! OP/ED "Pleasure Flag / Shin Ainaru Yume e!" Release Event "Miracle Greeting! 02" | |
| 2016 | AGF 2016 | |
| 2016 | Animax Musix 2016 Yokohama | |
| 2016 | DreFes! Blu-ray & DVD Hatsubai Kinen Event –Maki no heya– | |
| 2016 | LisOeuf Party! 2016 -Winter- | |
| 2016 | Amuse Presents Handsome Festival 2016 | |
| 2017 | DreFes! Fan Meeting 02 –Kansha o todokeru 2nd Stage!!– | |
| 2017 | DearDream 1st Full Album Real Dream Hatsubai Kinen Event "DearDream ga yuku Zenkoku Angya no Tabi" | |
| 2017 | DearDream 1st Live "Real Dream" | |
| 2017 | Original Entertainment Paradise -Ore Para- 10th Anniversary –Ore!! Summer– | |

=== Advertisements ===
Title
Nissan Serena
Nissen Holdings '06 Akigō

=== Radio ===
| Year | Title | Network | Ref. |
|---|---|---|---|
| 2015 | DearDream no DreFes! Radio | Animate Times | |
| 2016 | 60 Try-bu | Radio Nippon | |
| 2017 | Seishun Radi Mania | Radio Kansai | |
| 2017 | –True no omotenashi Radio– Tsuru Matsuya e yōkoso | NCB | |

=== Internet ===
| Year | Title | Channel | Ref. |
|---|---|---|---|
| 2014 | Super Handsome Live presents "Handsome Hōsōkyoku" | Stolabo Tokyo Ustream Channel | |
| 2016 | DearDream no Goshiki Donburi | Stolabo Tokyo Ustream Channel | |
| 2016 | Denpa Lab Story | Niconico Namahōsō | |
| 2016 | DreFes! Kenkyūshitsu | Animate Channel | |
| 2016 | "DreFes" Special Psycho―Koe teru! Miracle Stage | Animate Channel | |
| 2017 | "DreFes! Kenkyūshitsu" 2nd Season | Animate Channel | |
| 2017 | Special no Yorujuu | Space Shower TV | |

=== Anime television ===
| Year | Title | Role | Ref. |
|---|---|---|---|
| 2016 | DreFes! | Shin Oikawa | |
| 2017 | DreFes! 2nd Season | Shin Oikawa | |

=== Video games ===
| Year | Title | Role |
|---|---|---|
| 2016 | Live rhythm application DreFes! | Shin Oikawa |
| 2016 | Data Carddass DreFes! | Shin Oikawa |

=== Others ===
| Year | Title | Role |
|---|---|---|
| 2015 | 2.5-D idol support project DreFes! | Shin Oikawa |

== Works ==
=== CD ===
| Year | Title | Ref. |
|---|---|---|
| 2012 | The Handsome Show | |
| 2013 | Laugh & Peace | |
| 2014 | Ever Lasting Story | |
| 2016 | "New Star Evolution" | |
| 2016 | "Pleasure Flag" | |
| 2016 | Welcome To D-Four Production | |
| 2016 | Handsome Festival 2016 Yoshū Sound Track | |
| 2017 | DreFes! original soundtrack | |
| 2017 | Real Dream | |
| 2017 | Catch Your Yell!! | |

=== Image software ===
| Year | Title |
|---|---|
| 2009 | The Game –Boy's Film Show– |
| 2013 | Frogs |
| 2014 | Ore to Sekai wa Onaji Basho ni aru |
| 2015 | Boys, Be Handsome!!! |
| 2017 | Amuse Presents Handsome Festival 2016 |

==== DreFes! image software ====
| Year | Title | Ref. |
|---|---|---|
| 2016 | DreFes! 1 | |
| 2017 | DreFes! 2 | |
| 2017 | DreFes! 3 | |
| 2017 | DreFes! 4 | |
| 2017 | DreFes! 5 | |
| 2017 | DreFes! 6 | |
| 2017 | DreFes! Music Clip Blu-ray Documentary of DF Project | |

=== Books ===
| Year | Title | Ref. |
|---|---|---|
| 2016 | DreFes! Official Supporter Book | |
