= Nippon Television Holdings =

Japanese media holding company

Nippon Television Holdings, Inc.

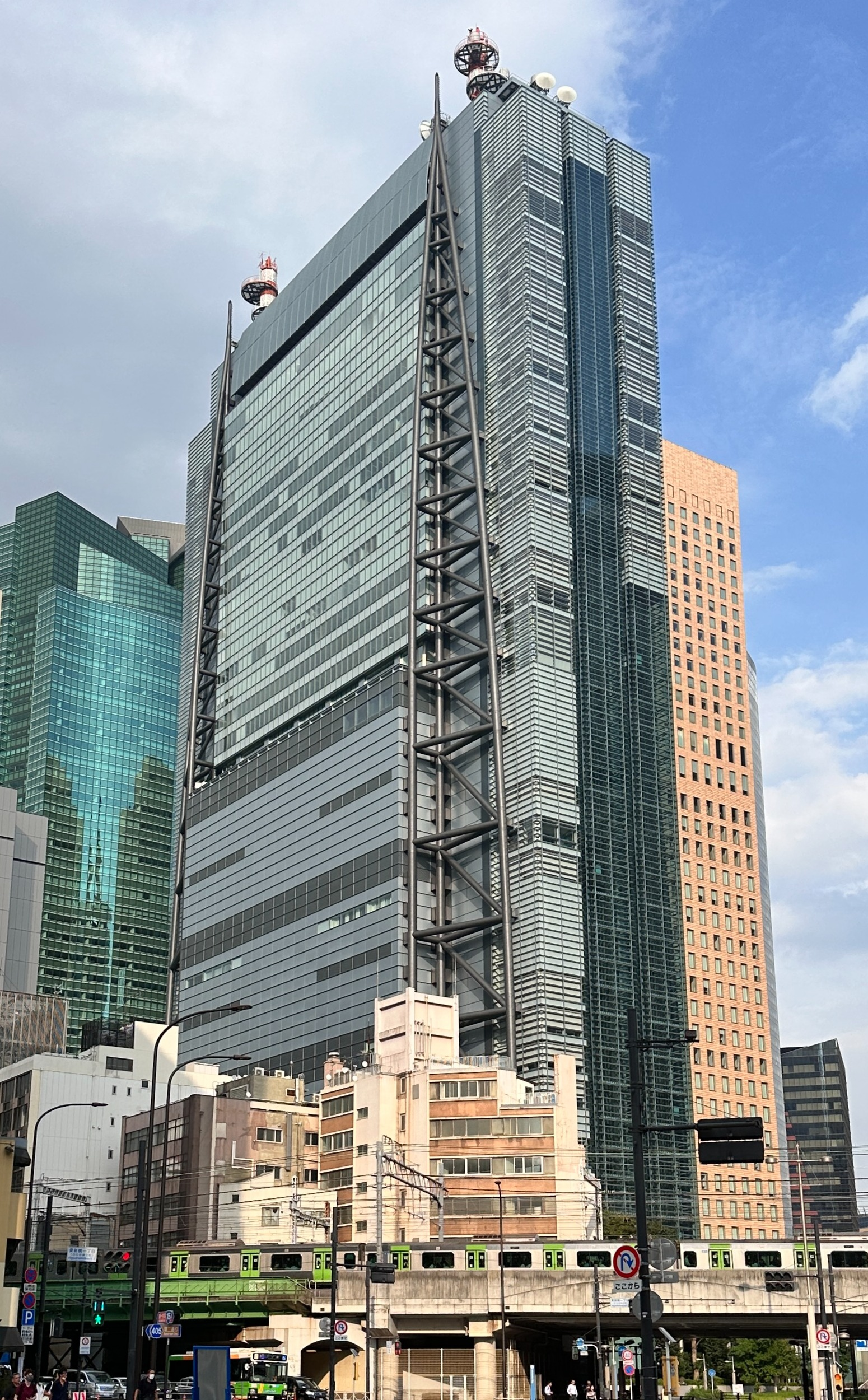
- Headquarters in Shiodome, Minato, Tokyo
- Native name: 日本テレビホールディングス株式会社
- Romanized name: Nihon Terebi Hōrudingusu Kabushiki-gaisha
- Formerly: Nippon Television Network Corporation (1952–2012)
- Type: Public KK
- Traded as: TYO: 9404
- ISIN: JP3732200005
- Industry: Media
- Founded: October 28, 1952; 73 years ago
- Founder: Matsutaro Shoriki
- Headquarters: Shiodome, Minato, Tokyo, Japan
- Area served: Worldwide
- Key people: Yoshikuni Sugiyama (Chairman and CEO); Hiroyuki Fukuda (President and COO)
- Services: Broadcast television and radio
- Revenue: ▲¥326,423 million (FY2012); ¥305,460 million (FY2011)
- Operating income: ▲¥35,429 million (FY2012); ¥32,249 million (FY2011)
- Net income: ▲¥25,284 million (FY2012); ¥22,729 million (FY2011)
- Total assets: ▲¥598,075 million (FY2012); ¥543,228 million (FY2011)
- Total equity: ▲¥488,120 million (FY2012); ¥446,038 million (FY2011)
- Owner: The Yomiuri Shimbun Holdings (14.45%); Yomiuri Shimbun Tokyo (6.11%); Other shareholders: Teikyo University (3.66%); NTT Docomo (2.98%); Recruit Holdings (2.47%); Yomiuriland (2.00%); Investment accounts (4.3% total)
- Number of employees: 3,259 (as of March 31, 2013, consolidated)
- Subsidiaries: Nippon Television Network Corporation; BS Nippon Corporation; CS Nippon Corporation; Nippon Television-News 24 Corporation; AX-ON Inc.; VAP; NTV Events; Nippon Television Music Corporation; Nippon Television Art; NTV Technical Resources; RF Radio Nippon Co. Ltd.; Tipness; NiTRO; ClaN Entertainment; Tatsunoko Production (55.2%); Yomiuri Chukyo FS Broadcasting Holdings (20%)
- Website: ntvhd.co.jp

Nippon Television Holdings, Inc. (Note: 日本テレビホールディングス株式会社, Nihon Terebi Hōrudingusu kabushiki gaisha) is a Japanese media and licensed broadcasting holding company headquartered in Minato, Tokyo. The company consists of Nippon Television, Japan's first commercial broadcaster and one of the country's main five television broadcasters as well as record label VAP, radio station RF Radio Nippon, HJ Holdings among others. NTV also runs the dual Nippon News Network and Nippon Television Network System, which consists of NTV themselves alongside a total of 30 television stations (both regional and prefectural) across Japan. The company also has shares in animation studios Tatsunoko Production, Madhouse & Studio Ghibli and film studio Nikkatsu. The company is partially controlled by The Yomiuri Shimbun Holdings, Japan's largest media conglomerate and second largest behind Sony, owning 14.45% of the company's shares. Kansai region flagship Yomiuri Telecasting Corporation also holds a 6.57% share in NTVHD and both broadcasters make up the television branch of the Yomiuri Shimbun Group of companies.

The company was formed on October 28, 1952, as the Nippon Television Network Corporation (Note: 日本テレビ放送網株式会社, Nihon Terebi Hōsōmō kabushiki gaisha) after applying for what would become Japan's first commercial television license three months prior. NTV signed on a year later on August 28, becoming Japan's second television station and the first commercial broadcaster in Asia. Following the restructurings of other Kanto region broadcasters, such as Fuji Television into Fuji Media Holdings in 2008 and Tokyo Broadcasting System into Tokyo Broadcasting System Holdings in 2009 as well as the formation of TV Tokyo Holdings in 2010, NTV alongside BS-NTV and CS-NTV began a restructuring plan in 2012, which caused NTV to restructure into a certified holding company and rebranded into NTVHD, spinning off the broadcasting division under a wholly-owned subsidiary with the NTV name. Prior to this, NTV had shares in the latter two.

== History ==
Prior to 2012, NTV was reluctant about restructuring into a holding company in the wake of Fuji TV's restructuring that year and TBS' restructuring announcement. Shintaro Kubo, NTV's then-president said during the company's shareholder meeting on March 24, 2008, that it wasn't necessary at that time.

On May 12, 2012, Nippon Television, alongside BS Nippon Corporation and CS Nippon Corporation announced that they were planning to merge their businesses through the creation of a certified holding company. Under this structure, the Nippon Television Network Preparatory Corporation would be created to take over NTV's broadcasting business as a wholly-owned subsidiary (which was formed on April 1) with the previous incarnation changing its name to Nippon Television Holdings. The restructuring was given shareholder approval on June 28. On September 16th of that year, NTV gave approval from the Ministry of Internal Affairs and Communications to restructure into a holding company. The restructuring was completed a month later on October 1, with NTVHD retaining NTV's listing on the Tokyo Stock Exchange.

On January 29, 2014, the company purchased 54.3% of the outstanding shares in animation studio Tatsunoko Production from Takara Tomy. Tomy would continue to retain 20% of the studio's shares.

On February of that same month, NTVHD purchased Hulu's Japanese division, which marked NTV's first entry into the streaming market. In March of that year, NTV purchased all remaining shares of Madhouse from Index Corporation, which was liquidated and bought out by Sega Sammy Holdings (which owns TMS Entertainment) the year prior. On November 29, NTVHD purchased fitness company Tipness from Suntory Holdings. This marked NTV's entry into the fitness center business.

On February 3, 2022, NTVHD announced a major restructuring which would see the merger of several subsidiaries, as well as the spin-off of NTV's VTuber business into a separate company. On June 29 of that same year, Akira Ishizawa was appointed as president and CEO of NTV.

On September 21, 2023, Nippon Television announced that it would buy a controlling share in Studio Ghibli and make it a subsidiary. The takeover was completed on October 6.

On November 29, 2024, NTVHD announced that four NNN/NNS affiliates, Yomiuri TV, Chukyo TV, The Sapporo Television Broadcasting and Fukuoka Broadcasting System would merge and integrate its operations to form a holding company known as Yomiuri Chukyo FS Broadcasting Holdings Corp. Unlike a full restructuring of either YTV, CTV, STV or FBS, all four companies will become wholly-owned subsidiaries of the new entity, based at NTVHD's headquarters in Minato with its operations, including its corporate functions, remaining intact. The merger, classified as a joint-stock transfer is set to be completed by April 1, 2025, pending approval from the MIC. NTVHD would own 20% in the company's shares. In preparation for the company's establishment, Akira Ishizawa will be appointed as president of FYCS as he plans to step down from NTV after a 45-year run by the beginning of 2025. Hiroyuki Fukuda would later be appointed as president and CEO of both NTV and NTVHD beginning January 1 of that year.
