= Shirō Fukai =

Japanese composer (1907–1959)

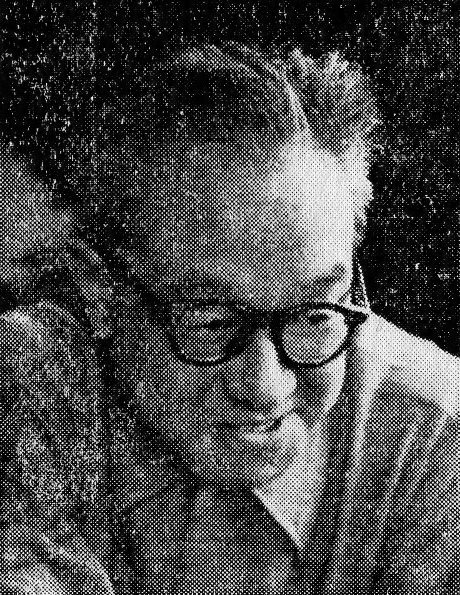
- Born: April 4, 1907; Akita, Japan
- Died: July 2, 1959 (aged 52); Kyoto, Japan
- Other name: 深井 史郎
- Occupation: composer

Shirō Fukai (深井 史郎, Fukai Shirō; 4 April 1907 - 2 July 1959) was a Japanese composer.

== Works, editions and recordings ==
- Quatre mouvements parodiques (1933/36)
- Metropolis, ballet (1934)
- Création, ballet (1940)
- The 47 Ronin, film (1941)
- Symphonic suite "Song of Manchuria" (1941)
- Chantes de Java (1942)
- Voice of Autumn, ballet (1950)
- Cantata "Prayer for Peace" (1950)
- Divertissement pour 13 exécutants (1955)
- Trois mouvements pour un ballet imaginaire (1956)
- Symphonic Picture Scroll "Tokyo" (1957)
- Four Japanese Folk Songs (1957)
- I. Ina, II. Sailing Out, III. Yanshichi of Yabe. (日本の笛 "Japan's flute") Yoshikazu Mera. BIS
- Hato no kyojitsu (鳩の休日) (A dove's day off). Used on Nippon Television's station identification. Was later recorded in 1978 by Yomiuri Nippon Symphony Orchestra for Nippon TV’s 25th anniversary.
