= Captured Hospital =

Japanese television series

Captured Hospital (Japanese: 大病院占拠, Hepburn: Dai byōin senkyo), is an original Nippon TV suspense drama in which a detective on leave confronts a mysterious demon-mask-wearing armed group holding hostages at a large hospital. It aired from January 14, 2023, to March 18, 2023. The drama's protagonist is Arashi's Sho Sakurai.

A sequel centered on a hostage situation in an airport started airing in January 2024.

On May 17, 2025, a new installment of the "Captured" series was announced, with Sakurai returning as detective Musashi, and hinting at the possible return of Fuma Kikuchi as his character Koichi Yamato ("Blue Oni"), as the announcement poster shows Musashi holding the blue oni mask. This new installment, centered on a hostage situation at a broadcasting station, started airing in July 2025.

A new series, ''Undercover siblings: Special fraud investigators'', started on October 5, 2024, unites in a crossover teams from Voice: 110 Emergency Control Room and Captured Hospital/Captured New Airport, with Gunpi reprising his role as Renji Shima in the first episode. In an interview, Gunpi hinted that "That person could also appear", referring to Sakurai's character.

Spinoffs of the "Captured" series, "The night before", "Run, Mouse, Run!" and "After the Broadcasting Station Occupation SEQUEL" aired on Hulu.

A third sequel was hinted at, when the official SNS of the series posted on November 10, 2026, a "blank" image with two very small emojis, one showflake and one skier, writing on the post "Next...". On November 14, details were revealed about the new installment. It is scheduled to air as a 2–hour special during the New Year's celebrations, date still pending.

== Plot ==
Yūko Musashi, a heart surgeon at Kaiseido Hospital, a general hospital in Kanagawa, is one of the hostages of the "Hyakki Yagyo" armed group who protect their identities wearing oni masks. She is currently separated from her husband, police detective Saburo Musashi. Detective Musashi was involved in a fatal case the year before, and is receiving psychological treatment for it. Other hostages include Kanagawa Governor, Michie Nagato, and Yui Inaba, a former reporter, currently a video streamer. who reveals the identity of a pair of the masked team on a live feed. Saburo, just released from his session, hears a faint tick tock behind a closed door. He gets caught in an explosion that throws him clear over to the other side of the hall. As he reports the incident to police superintendent Izumi, members of the crime group attack him with gun-wielding drones. He escapes, when he notices his wife among the taken. The occupant's leader starts streaming in their newly opened YouTube-like channel to increasing viewers.

Saburo goes to the police's Headquarters, where he starts a discussion with Blue Oni, the occupant's leader. To release the hostages, Saburo has to decipher riddles and clues given by Blue Oni. As he investigates to solve the riddles, Saburo uncovers truths about medical doctor Daisuke Tosa and other hostages. Saburo continues retrieving the information, but is late in relaying his findings to Blue Oni, which makes him angry. Blue Oni urges Saburo to find out Governor Nagato's "sins". Saburo and Yūko's daughter, Emiri, has left the hotel where she was under police protection, and goes missing. Her whereabouts have also links to the case.

As the story develops, so do the stories of the masked team, including Kiyoshi Hitachi (Gray Oni), a psychiatrist, and his daughter, Arisa (Peach Oni), and Minoru Sado, the hospital's Head of Surgery, who gets shot by the police's SIS sniper team, as he takes the place of Blue Oni at the entrance of the hospital, where Saburo has gone to negotiate.

== Cast ==
Cast information

=== Musashi Family ===
==== Saburo Musashi ====
Played by Sho Sakurai

Lieutenant in the Kanagawa Prefectural Police Department, detective First Investigative Division. His catch phrase is "You're lying." He is on leave from work due to the trauma during an event the year before, when he fired a gun at the criminal at a gas station, resulting in an explosion that claimed the criminal's life. Because of this, he becomes estranged from his wife Yūko and daughter Emiri. He is receiving psychological treatment at Kaiseido Hospital, when he encounters an armed group occupying the hospital and confronts them.

==== Yūko Musashi ====
Played by Manami Higa

Saburo's estranged wife. She is a heart surgeon at Kaiseido Hospital. During a heart surgery operation, becomes hostage in the occupation incident, but she negotiates with the armed group's leader, Blue Oni, to have her patient released.

==== Emiri Musashi ====
Played by Honoka Yoshida

Daughter of Saburo and Yūko. She is isolated in a hotel to ensure her safety during the hostage incident, but is revealed in social media as Musashi's daughter. Escaping from the hotel, she is abducted, but later rescued, due to Musashi's frantic pursuit and KSBC's audio analysis.

=== Kanagawa Prefectural Police ===
Cast information

==== Sakura Izumi ====
Played by Sonim

Superintendent of the Kanagawa Prefectural Police, administrator of the Special Investigation Division (SIS) and commander of the Emergency Investigation Command Headquarters. Musashi's colleague from the police academy. Lost her husband three years before, protecting Governor Nagato, who was advised to proceed with research on infectious diseases in Japan, after a death at a ship anchored in Shin Yokohama due to a stealth virus.

==== Saki Suruga ====
Played by Mayu Miyamoto

Lieutenant in the Kanagawa Prefectural Police. Information analyst at the Investigation Support Analysis Center (KSBC). Involved in saving Musashi, by creating a loop of the surveillance images at the Yokohama Kita Police Station, where Musashi is being monitored in an interrogation room where a bomb has been planted. Considered a double agent, when the drama ends with a scene in which she deletes an e-mail that says Thank you Blue in a dimly lit room, takes off her glasses, and smiles. Returns in sequel as Beast "Snake".

==== Renji Shima ====
Played by Gunpi (from the comedy duo Haru to Hikoki)

Lieutenant in the Kanagawa Prefectural Police. Information analyst at KSBC. He receives a secret message from Musashi, who is wanted by Bizen for the murder of Director Harima, and provides him with information about Director Harima and a route back to the hospital.

==== Kazuki Tamba ====
Played by Hiroyuki Hirayama

Superintendent in the Kanagawa Prefectural Police. Administrator of the Security Department SAT (Special Forces). Suspected to be one of the informants between the police and the masked group. Appears in sequel as Beast "Tiger" (3rd episode).

==== Takeshi Bizen ====
Played by Atsuro Watabe

Chief of Kanagawa Prefectural Police Headquarters. Superintendent of Police. In order to hide his misdoings with Director Harima, he moves to the Yokohama Kita Police Station, where the bombing incident occurred, under the pretext of taking command, killing Harima with Musashi's gun. The whole story was made public on Hyakki Yagyo Channel, thanks to the wiretapping device planted by Blue Oni. He admitted that he shot and killed him, and was taken to Kanagawa Prefectural Police. At the request of Nagato, a colleague from his university days, he concealed the "P2 Plan" and the deaths of three people infected with the virus, Daiki Kaga, Sosuke Hinata, and Kotone Yamashiro, who died as a result of being involved in the plan, by disguising it as a traffic accident.

=== Kaiseido Hospital personnel ===
Cast information

==== Sadaharu Harima ====
Played by Kanji Tsuda

Director. Faked an alibi posting a photo at a hotel rooftop restaurant on social media the day of Masami Kai's death. Musashi discovers that he had the same photo, but it was from a different day, since the Landmark Tower in the background was lit only during Golden Week. He admits that he did it to cover up the fact that Iwami killed Kai on his behalf. Ao Oni mentions that he will not be released because there are other hidden sins that need to be exposed. He is killed in the interrogation room of Yokohama Kita Police Station by Bizen, who uses Musashi's gun after knocking him unconscious.

==== Noboru Wakasa ====
Played by Yu Inaba

Surgeon. Yuko's colleague, assistant and partner. He is somewhat insecure and unreliable at times. He considers Yuko a role model, especially when it comes to confronting the armed group.

==== Minoru Sado ====
Played by Masanobu Sakata

Head of surgery. He tried to outwit the armed group and escape from the hospital alone, but he failed. He is made to take the place of Blue Oni, who predicted the attack by SAT at the time the hostages were released. After being shot in the shoulder, he went into hemorrhagic shock and became unconscious. He later undergoes emergency surgery by Yuko and survives.

==== Daisuke Tosa ====
Played by Hideyuki Kasahara

Pulmonologist. A popular celebrity doctor who has appeared on many TV shows. Falsified Akari's death certificate to cover up his crime involving a drug exchange party, in which Akari died of an overdose. He was exposed on Hyakki Yagyo Channel.

==== Kana Iwami ====
Played by Eriko Nakamura

Director's secretary. Had an affair with Harima. On behalf of Harima, she injected Masami with a muscle relaxant in an underground parking lot in Shin-Yokohama, killing her.

==== Ōsumi Shirō ====
Played by Kazunari Uryuu

Chief office manager. He is prepared to die when the armed group takes over the hospital, leaving a farewell letter to his son, who lives with his ex-wife. He is one of the few people who knows about the existence of the fourth basement floor.

==== Aki Shiori ====
Played by Kumi Kureshiro

Nurse. She suffers from ketoacidosis due to pancreatic disease and has been using insulin injections for the past six months. Masami helps her with her treatment. Investigating the cause of Masami's suspicious death, she becomes an informant for the armed group, steals Osumi's notebook, and takes the elevator to the fourth basement floor of the hospital, using the 11-digit password "Triceratops".

=== Kanagawa Prefecture ===
==== Michie Nagato ====
Played by Mariko Tsutsui

Prefectural governor. She finds herself in the hostage incident while inspecting the general ward of Kaiseido Hospital. Three years before, in the Premium Panakeia, docked at Shin-Yokohama Port, a virus contagion incident prompted the need to establish a research facility to deal with cases, but encountered strong opposition from residents, forcing the establishment of a secret research facility on the fourth basement floor of Kaiseido Hospital. In it, the "P2 Project" was used to study infectious diseases. Daiki Kaga, a researcher at the facility, was infected with the Hydra virus, the equivalent to a level 4 virus that killed 400,000 people in West Asia. Sosuke Hinata and Kotone Yamashiro were infected with the virus after coming into contact with him at Hotel Oshima. She sought help from Bizen, a classmate from his university days, making the deaths look as a traffic accident. When the full details of the "P2 Plan" are revealed by Musashi, she is injected by Blue Oni and released. Believing she had been injected with the Hydra virus, it was revealed that she had been injected with saline in order to encourage people to vote on social media.

=== Reporters ===
==== Yui Inaba ====
Played by Rio Asumi

A former newspaper reporter, currently video streamer with over 2.5 million subscribers. She received an email saying, "I want you to find out the truth about the hospital." As she enters the hospital; she witnesses the armed group infiltrate it, and reports from inside. She collaborates with Hyakki Yagyo Channel, resulting in being accused of not reporting justice but only thinking of how to gain more viewers.

==== Nanako Noto ====
Played by Erina Masuda

Staff of "Inabaur Channel", the streaming channel ot Yui Inaba.

=== Armed group ===
An armed group masked with Oni masks, called Hyakki Yagyō, takes Kaiseido Hospital hostage.

==== Kōichi Yamato (Blue Oni) ====
Played by Fuma Kikuchi (Sexy Zone) and Atsuki Yamada (as a child)

He is a leader of the armed group. His true identity is the CEO of the app development company "IZUMO Vision." An older brother to Kotone Yamashiro, who grew up in the same foster family. He wants to right the wrongs in the world, seeking revenge. Just as he wants for Musashi to pay for the killing at the gas station, he also seeks compensation from all those who he deems indebted. He injected Governor Nagato and himself with physiological saline disguised as the Hydra virus, and called for an online vote to decide which is right: to protect Japan's 120 million people, or to protect one loved one. Appears in sequel, after being in jail 1 year.

==== Takashi Mimasaka (Red Oni) ====
Played by Shugo Oshinari

In charge of hacking. His true identity is of co-owner of IZUMO Vision. An older brother to Kotone Yamashiro, who grew up in the same foster family.

==== Misaki Iyo (Black Oni) ====
Played by Becky

A mood maker for Hyakki Yagyō. Creator of the demon mask. Her true identity is the co-owner of IZUMO Vision. An older sister to Kotone Yamashiro, who grew up in the same foster family

==== Yuriko Hyuga (White Oni) ====
Played by Sei Matobu

She cares about her friends and is a mother figure to Hyakki Yagyō. She is Sōsuke's mother. She is a nursery teacher living in Osaka. She divorced in 2018. Stands up to the SIS team with determination to destroy them, but she is hit by a bullet and taken into custody

==== Kimiaki Settsu (Yellow Oni) ====
Played by Shuji Kashiwabara

He is skilled with firearms and boasts high physical ability. His true identity is Sōsuke's father. A bomb expert who belonged to the Japan Ground Self-Defense Force's unexploded ordnance disposal team. He currently runs a security company. He sends a message expressing his gratitude for Sōsuke's birth and stands up to the SIS team with determination to destroy him, but he is hit by a bullet and is taken into custody

==== Kiyoshi Hitachi (Grey Oni) ====
Played by Kenji Mizuhashi

He hides a strong will behind his calm tone. He is Musashi's attending physician, a psychosomatic physician at Kaiseido Hospital, who was supposed to have been shot to death by Blue Oni as a demonstration. He joined the armed group to investigate the truth behind the death of Masami Kai, his common-law wife and stepmother of his daughter Arisa. He sends a message that he loves Masami and stands up to the SIS team with determination to destroy it, but on the way he locks Arisa in a hospital room to avoid a gunfight, gets hit by a bullet, and has her taken into custody.

==== Arisa Hitachi (Peach Oni) ====
Played by Nana Asakawa

A strong-willed and free-spirited personality. Her true identity is a college student, daughter of Kiyoshi Hitachi. In order to find out the truth behind the death of her stepmother, Masami Kai, she joins the armed group. She sends a message thanking her for being born as the child of her stepmother, Masami, and stands up to the SIS squad with determination to destroy it, but her father, Kiyoshi, locks her in a hospital room and isolates her from the gunfight.

==== Ryusei Kaga (Orange Oni) ====
Played by Kanro Morita

His true identity is the second of the three Kaga brothers, older brother of Daiki Kaga. He runs a bar with his older brother Yugo and works as a bartender. He joins the armed group to reveal the truth about his brother's death to the world. He has a violent temper, gets angry easily, and has a rough tone.

==== Yugo Kaga (Brown Oni) ====
Played by Yozuke Omizu (comic duo Rubber Girl)

Nervous and sensitive to changes in the surroundings. Speak in a feminine tone. His true identity is the eldest of the three Kaga brothers and the older brother of Kaga Daiki. Manager of a bar with his younger brother Ryusei. He joins an armed group to reveal the truth about his brother's death to the world. He protects Arisa from being fired upon by an SIS member, and is hit in the chest. He receives emergency resuscitation from Yuko, but dies.

==== Makoto Suo (Green Oni) ====
Played by Jun Murakami

The oldest of the team, and its spiritual pillar. His true identity is the owner of the electronics store "Suoh Denki." A single father who raised his only daughter, Akari, in place of his widowed wife. In order to take revenge on Tosa for causing Akari's death with illegal drugs, he joins an armed group and exposes Tosa's crimes on the Hyakki Yagyo Channel. He used Akari's medical card to infiltrate Kaiseido Hospital, and was able to find out his true identity after Musashi saw him dragging his right leg, which was disabled due to a traffic accident. He sends out a message apologizing for not being able to save Akari and stands up to the SIS squad, determined to destroy them, but he is hit by a bullet and taken into custody.

==== Shunsuke Sagami (Purple Oni) ====
Played by Jin Shirasu

A whistleblower within the police force who leaks police information to the armed group. His true identity is an SIS investigator who serves as an assistant negotiator in a hospital barricade case.

=== Other ===
==== Katsumi Tsushima ====
Played by Haruka Uchimura

Assistant Manager of Hotel Oshima, who was Emiri's kidnapper, posing as Purple Oni, after covering Harima's crime by receiving a large sum of money and deleting surveillance video during Harima's stay.

==== Daiki Kaga ====
Played by Satoshi Hashimoto

Researcher at the Center for Infectious Disease Research. Ryusei (Orange Oni) and Yugo Kaga's (Brown Oni) younger sibling. He was reported as the perpetrator of a car accident in which 2 other people had died to cover up the 3 deaths occurred at the Hotel Oshima due to the Hydra virus, of which he also died, as one of Harima's victims.

==== Sōsuke Hyuga ====
Played by Morishima Ritsuto

Only son of Yuriko Hyuga (White Oni) and Kimiaki Settsu (Yellow Oni), who died at Hotel Oshima due to the Hidra virus. His death was reported as a victim of the Kaga car accident.

==== Kotone Yamashiro ====
Played by Seira Jonishi, Renwa Satō (as a child)

One of the reported victims of the Kaga car accident, she was Yamato, Mimasaka and Iyo's foster sister, and Sagami's fiancée. She was pregnant with Sagami's child at the time of her death. Her body was sealed in the fourth basement of Kaseido Hospital at the order of Governor Nagato as part of the "P2 Plan".

==== Masami Kai ====
Played by Aki Nishihara

Infectious disease specialist killed for her intention to reveal "P2 Plan" to the world. Her death was reported as by a heart attack. She was Kiyoshi Hitachi's (Grey Oni) Common-law wife and Arisa Hitachi's (Peach Oni) stepmother.

== Captured New Airport ==
Captured New Airport (新空港占拠, Shin kūkō senkyo), with the motto "The beast dreams of flying in the sky", is Captured Hospital series second installment. It started on 13 January 2024. Snow Man's "W" continues from the original series as theme song.

Detective Saburo Musashi (played by Sakurai) gets caught in a new occupation situation carried out by a beast mask-wearing group called "Kemono", this time in Kanagawa's first international airport. Musashi has only 1 day to solve the clues.

The new series' cast was revealed starting in December 2023. Reprising their roles from the original, besides Sakurai, are Manami Higa (who plays Saburo's wife, Yūko Musashi, one of the hostages in the first series), Sonim (Sakura Izumi, Superintendent of the Kanagawa Police), and Gunpi (Renji Shima, Kanagawa Police Lieutenant and Information Analyst at KSBC). Honoka Yoshida reprises as Emiri Musashi, as mentioned in the cast page and the correlation chart. The new cast members were revealed just a few days later.

=== New series' cast ===
Police

- Mio Iwatsuki (played by Sei Shiraishi), a new member of the command headquarters (see "kemono")
- An Honjo (played by Kumi Takiuchi), an assistant inspector of the local police
- Kazuo Kawagoe (played by Jin Katagiri), chief of the local police

Government

- Masao Mibu (played by Tōru Tezuka), a mysterious man, who is in reality Shigeru Kitami, a member of the House of Representatives accused of crimes related to the hospital occupation incident the year before. (see "Other kemono")
- Futaba Musashi (played by Kaoru Okunuki), a member of the Kanagawa Prefectural Assembly. She is Saburo's older sister

Airport

- Mika Tendo (played by Asuka Kurosawa), airport president
- Kensuke Uwajima (played by Takayuki Hamatsu), airport president Tendo's loyal secretary
- Hideo Yonezawa (played by Seiya Osada), airport corporate lawyer
- Masaru Kurume (played by Kazuhito Tomikawa), an airport employee
- Iwao Shirakawa (played by Tōta Tawaragi), chairman of the Shirakawa group, who oversaw the construction of the airport
- Momoka Niimi (played by Anzu Kusunoki), Shirakawa's secretary, and Sena Shigehara's friend

Other

- Koichi Yamato (played by Fuma Kikuchi, who reprises his role from the original series)
- Police officer Saku Ayabe (played by Kengo Yoshida), who goes looking for the mysterious man at the Musashi's home and traps Yuko and Emiri
- Haruma Hikone (played by Tetsuro Tsuchioka of Haru to Hikoki, Data Center Security Guard.
- Hyakushu Shrine Priest (played by Kazuaki Hankai)

Kemono
As with the previous series, the masked group members are sequentially revealed, with both the character and the actor's identities remaining a secret to be uncovered. The first image posted of the armed team's members was that of "Dragon", the group's leader, while the first "Beast" to be revealed was "Snake".

- Dragon (leader) Yuzuki Suruga (played by Maryjun Takahashi), Saki Suruga's sister, Kenichi Musashi's daughter, Futaba and Saburo's niece (role revealed in episode 5, true identity revealed later)
- Snake / Saki Suruga (played by Mayu Miyamoto, reprising her role from the original series), Yuzuki Suruga's sister, Kenichi Musashi's daughter, Futaba and Saburo's niece (role revealed in episode 1, true identity revealed later)
- Horse / Kaito Horie (played by Kaminari's Takeuchi Manabu) (revealed in episode 4)
- Ox / Rumi Kakegawa (played by Lalando's Saya) (revealed in episode 4)
- Tiger / former Special Forces SAT Administrator Kazuki Tamba (Hiroyuki Hirayama reprising his role from the original series) (revealed in episode 3)
- Monkey / Naoki Tamba (played by Yoji Iwase) (revealed in episode 3)
- Dog / Mio Iwatsuki, Ai Tamba's sister (see "police"). She infiltrated the police as Saki Suruga's replacement to pass on information gathered by the police to the masked group. (mask shown in eps. 4 and 5)

Kemono breakoff group
Formed by Taiga Niimi, after disagreeing with Yuzuki Suruga over the soft treatment of the hostages.

- Rat / Taiga Niimi (played by Jesse (SixTones), Momoka Niimi's brother
- Rabbit / Kanade Hamamatsu (played by Seira Anzai), Uta Hamamatsu's sister, daughter of Hamamatsu, the victim at the Hyakushu incident (revealed in episode 5)
- Rooster / Sena Shigehara (played by Kasumi Yamaya), former Shirakawa Group President's assistant (revealed in episode 2)
- Sheep / Uta Hamamatsu (played by Chihiro Yamamoto), Kanade Hamamatsu's sister, daughter of Hamamatsu, the victim at the Hyakushu incident (revealed in episode 5)
- Boar / Hitoshi Matsunaga, (played by Takenori Goto), Kaito Horie's childhood friend and dating Rumi Kakegawa (revealed in episode 4)

Other Kemono

- Wildcat ("Yamaneko")
  - (1st) Tetsuo Mutsu, founder of Mutsu Construction. He was involved in the airport construction.
  - (False 2nd) Shigeru Kitami, involved in the killing of Tamba's wife, and in other incidents regarding the hospital situation the year before. Held hostage in the airport incident. (see "government")
  - (2nd) Futaba Musashi, Saburo Musashi's sister. A government worker linked to a secret project (see "government")

=== Story ===
A woman flees from an attacker. A paper with a zodiac seal. She pricks Musashi with a needle and renders him unconscious, after he rescues her from the attacker. Some airline attendants place suitcases at an airport's entrances, while a "cleaning crew" shoots tranquilizing darts at security police. Musashi and his sister talk about how they got caught. She tells him that it was related to the disappearance of their older brother Kenichi 30 years before. One of beast-masked people's tablet reads "60 minutes until airport occupation". 45 minutes later, it starts, with the airport's system hacked, as the opening ceremony begins. The beasts remind Saburo of the past occupation. The Kanagawa New Airport is now overtaken. The Musashis try to get out as one of the suitcases explodes.

Sakura Izumi, on leave since the last occupation, is requested by Musashi. Izumi heads the investigation, and a new member takes Suruga's place. As Musashi's information reaches the team, Shima and Iwatsuki notice the masks are animals of the zodiac, with two missing: mouse and dog. The police chase the suspects that held the Musashi siblings, who are attacked and taken with the other hostages. A live feed of the suspects, as they are killed by a suitcase bomb in a cargo container, is projected unto the airport's main hall. Izumi tried to stop the team at the scene, but is overrun by Chief Kawagoe.

The Beasts (YouTube-like) channel show the hostages. Suruga surprises Musashi revealing she is one of the Beasts. After the hostages lives are threatened, Musashi negotiates between the Beasts and the police. Futaba leads an escape plan. The police close in as Musashi comes out a trash chute with a bomb on him. One hour to decipher Iwao Shirakawa's crime's clue posted on the virus-hacked KSBC computers. A year before, Shirakawa sued Momoka Niimi for embezzlement after she complained about cases of power harassment. She died by suicide after suffering from off and online harassment. Niimi's PC, hacked by Yonezawa Law office, the airport's lawyer's firm, was used to change her testimony. Her friend Sena pledged to avenge her becoming a Beast, the Rooster. The Beast Channel showed Shirakawa abusing his employees.

Sena's information now takes Musashi and Honjo to a trap-filled abandoned factory. Honjo fights for her life over a roller crusher, while Musashi is trapped in a cell. The escaped hostages get caught. The next "victim", Yonezawa, has to reveal his ties without saying who it is. The police have 50 minutes. The KSBC relays to Musashi. Masao Mibu is in reality Shigeru Kitami, a House of Representatives member on the run from multiple crimes related to the prior occupation. Futaba goes to the Beast's control room, expecting to be next, but Dragon, who called her about Kenichi, thanks her for the information. She and the re-captured hostages return to the closed room. The Beasts free Yonezawa and bring Mibu in. "Tiger" and "Monkey" are revealed, surprising the police. It was former Special Forces SAT Administrator Kazuki Tamba and his son, Naoki. Both left the force 6 months before. Tamba's wife, Ai, a freelance journalist, died by suicide after being slandered by allegations of fabrication in an article involving Kitami, with no proof. Shima goes to a data center to find the content on one of Ai Tamba's files that Iwatsuki finds. Musashi has to discover Mibu's (Kitami's) lies, learning things from an unexpected source: Koichi Yamato (Blue Oni, hospital incident leader), who Musashi visits in jail. Musashi thinks Yamato and Suruga are linked in the current incident, but he says they only worked together in the past. As Musashi leaves frustrated, Yamato tells him: "Who were the animals not included in the zodiac?" Shima, who discovers surveillance cameras videos in the file, is trapped in the data center, and is found unconscious by Musashi and the center's security guard.

Emiri calls Yuko, who is on her way home from the hospital, when she is held at gun point by a hurt man who she tried to help, then forced to go to her own house to cure him. Something catches his eye from the photos there. While he sleeps, Yuko frees herself and Emiri, and gets out, as policeman Ayabe arrives. Ayabe lets them in the car, as he searches for the mysterious man, who is awake and hiding. In Ayabe's incoming messages, one tells him to get rid of Yuko and Emiri. They try to escape, but are locked in. Yuko calls the police. Musashi is made aware.

Tendo, away from the group, reads a note from the Beasts. She could poison one of the hostages to be let free. Police learn that Ai Tamba was killed by Kawagoe under Kitami's orders, but before he confesses, Kawagoe dies poisoned, supposedly, by Izumi. Musashi is in shock, but believes in her innocence, and tries to prove it. The Tendo poison plot is shared by the Beasts to the hostages. The rest of the Beasts reveal their faces and identities. "Sheep and "Rabbit" demand Tendo as next to be "judged". At home, the mysterious man protects Yuko from being killed by Ayabe.

Musashi goes to Hyakushu Shrine, where the priest attacks him. Izumi, suspected of murder and removed from her post, returns thanks to Musashi, Honjo and Shima teaming up to find evidence proving her innocence. Musashi learns that Tendo ordered Kawagoe to kill Hamamatsu, an oppositor of the construction of the airport. She had also ordered payment to a witness to keep quiet. Musashi's new task: find the "Wildcat", the mastermind behind Tendo. Yuko and Emiri end up as the mystery man's hostages in the beasts' hideout, where he reveals his identity as the "Rat", one of them. He tells Yuko that someone he loved died because of her. Yamato tells Honjo that he was to gather information on the Wildcat for Saki from Kitami's secretary, who was in the same detention center as him. A first "Wildcat" is named: Tetsuo Mutsu, founder of Mutsu Construction, involved in the airport construction. A new "Wildcat" took his place after his death 10 years before. The hostages, headed by Kitami, capture Rumi Kakegawa (Ox), and demand Yuzuki to let them go. Niimi and his followers clash with Yuzuki. Izumi orders a team to go after Musashi, who has taken Tendo. Kitami, suspected to be the Wildcat, confirms it. However, Niimi finds information on a chip that counters it. Niimi blocks the Beast's channel with his own signal and demands Musashi to reveal what Yuko has done, threatening to kill her. Musashi learns that Yuko didn't attend Momoko Niimi, due to the hospital giving preference to someone else. As Musashi says this, Iwatsuki reveals herself as a beast. A small bomb goes off in police HQ. Musashi is now the next hostage: the headphone Musashi is wearing has a bomb. Police have to find the reason behind the disappearance of Kenichi Musashi. Something strange in the beasts' PC makes Yuzuki and Saki think there is a traitor within.

Kenichi Musashi's mental health was thought as his reason to stop working at City Hall. However investigation results were false. He was searching for evidence of Kitami's fraud, and was killed in front of Futaba, who was Kitami's secretary at the time. Futaba, who hid this from Saburo, also kept Junko Suruga, Kenichi's lover and the twin's pregnant mother, away from the family, supposedly to prevent her from getting involved. Junko, forced to raise the girls by herself, got involved in bad dealings, and left the girls alone. Yuzuki and the others tried to escape from the airport during the pre-recorded stream, while Niimi was on his way there. Sena betrays Niimi by going to Naoki Tamba, enraging Niimi. Five beasts are captured by the police. Saki is held by Niimi, who is pursued by Yuzuki.

Sena tells Musashi, Niimi's plans. Niimi went to the Yokohama Bayside Hotel, where the airport's Promotion Council general meeting was being held, planning to blow up himself, the other renegade beasts and the hostages, taking everyone with them. Shima, helped by Iwatsuki, blocks Niimi's broadcast. Yuzuki shoots Niimi. Musashi stops Futaba, who says she is the Wildcat, from killing herself. At the end of the episode, a free Yamato appears on a rooftop.

== Captured Broadcasting Station ==
Captured Broadcasting Station (放送局占拠, Hōsōkyoku senkyo) is the series' third installment, scheduled for July 2025. Events this time take place one year after the airport incident. Musashi gets transferred to the Metropolitan Police Department's Criminal Affairs Division BCCT. A new occupancy case surfaces, and Musashi begins an investigation with his new colleagues.
Manami Higa, Sonin, Kumi Takiuchi, and Gunpi were confirmed for the new installment on May 30, 2025, reprising their roles from the past series. Additional cast was added later on. Other confirmed returns are Honoka Yoshida as Yuko and Saburo's daughter Emiri, and Fuma Kikuchi as Koichi Yamato, the Oni armed group leader in the hospital incident.

=== Plot ===
Saburo Musashi finds himself in the middle of a hostage situation, again. This time, an Ayakashi Yōkai-masked armed group takes over a television broadcaster. 500 people find themselves hostage of this group. Someone familiar to Musashi also appears: Koichi Yamato, Blue Oni, leader in the Hospital incident. What is his role here?

=== Cast ===
Main cast Add. cast 1 Add. cast 2 Armed group image Armed group image DBS3 chart

Musashi Family

- Saburo Musashi (played by Sho Sakurai), detective of the Metropolitan Police Department's BCCT Criminal Division
- Yuko Musashi (played by Manami Higa), a heart surgeon; Saburo Musashi's wife
- Emiri Musashi (played by Honoka Yoshida), Yuko and Saburo's daughter

Police

- Sakura Izumi (played by Sonin), supervisor of the Metropolitan Police Department's BCCT Criminal Division; Saburo's boss
- An Honjo (played by Kumi Takiuchi), investigator of the Metropolitan Police Department's BCCT Criminal Division
- Shima Renji (played by Gunpi), an information analyst in the Metropolitan Police Department BCCT Criminal Investigation Division
- Keigo Yashiro (played by Katsunori Takahashi), head of the Metropolitan Police Department's Security Division
- Yuji Ibuki (played by Seishiro Kato), Saburo's wife Yuko's younger brother; investigator in the Metropolitan Police Department's BCCT Criminal Affairs Division
- Amakusa Itsuki (played by Ryōsuke Sota), an investigator in the Metropolitan Police Department's Security Division, Yashiro's subordinate
- Suzu Miyake (played by Mebuki Yoshida), an information analyst in the Criminal Affairs Division

TV Station

- Daichi Amami (played by Totsugi Shigeyuki), a TV station producer; Saburo's high school senior; one of the hostages
- Kanji Nadami (played by Akira Fukuzawa), a popular news anchor; one of the hostages
- Hisui Kutsuna (played by Nagisa Saitō), an assistant director; one of the hostages
- Tetsuma Hinode (played by Yoshiaki Kameda), a talented director of a news program; one of the hostages

Others

- Koichi Yamato (played by Fuma Kikuchi), the Oni armed group leader in the hospital incident
- Seira Okino (played by Reiko Kataoka), a head nurse at a university hospital who is running for governor; one of the hostages
- Junpei Shikine (played by Daichi Yamaguchi), the son of the Chief Cabinet Secretary; a popular national actor; one of the hostages
- Sanshirō Ōshiba (played by Shōji Mayama), the current governor of Tokyo; one of the hostages
- Ryutaro Mikawa (played by Takashi Kitadai), the head coach of a prestigious soccer school; candidate for Tokyo governor; one of the hostages
- Nonoka Manabe (played by Nozomi Miyabe), talent and influencer; one of the hostages
- Reo Tsukumi (played by Shounoshin Maeda, ep. 2, 3), Mikawa's abused student who died.
- Saneatsu Masaki / Saneatsu Jinai (played by Shoichiro Tanigawa, eps. 2–4), the owner of Masaki Cleaners, kidnapped by Yamato (real name revealed in ep.6).
- Ayame Masaki / Ayame Ohnohara (played by Yui Kitamura, eps. 2–4), Masaki Cleaner's owner's daughter, kidnapped by Yamato (real name revealed in ep.6).
- Nene Ogasawara (played by Reina Doi, ep.4), Oshiba's secretary, who was investigating his collusion with a construction company, indirectly killed by him (a heavy figurine fell on her head after he had pushed her away). She was Gonta Ogasawara's ("Kasa-obake") pregnant wife. The day of her death was their wedding anniversary.
- Kunimitsu Takatsu (played by Masataka Matsubara, ep. 5), father of the Takatsu siblings (Bakeneko and Tengu).

Ayakashi Yokai (masked group)

- "Hannya" (leader) Yuji Ibuki, Musashi's brother in law (see "Police")
- "Amabie" (studio camera) (played by Rie Tomosaka. Revealed in ep. 3), Sayuki Tsukumi, mother of Mikawa's abused student.
- "Kasa-obake" (production control room) (played by Taro Suruga. Revealed in ep. 4), Gonta Ogasawara, husband of Oshiba's secretary, Nene Ogasawara, who Oshiba had killed.
- "Bakeneko" {on-site manager) (played by Anna Iriyama, reprising her role from Undercover siblings: Special fraud investigators). Revealed in ep. 5) Minami Takatsu. She became a "Yokai" to avenge her father, who died by suicide after being framed by Hinode for peeping and secretly taking photos, unable to bear the escalating slander.
- "Kappa" (mood maker) (played by Hiru Kashiwagi. Revealed in ep. 5) Haruto Takatsu. Bakeneko's Minami Takatsu's younger brother.
- "Tengu" (martial artist) (played by Daisuke Shiba (Mog Rider. Revealed in ep. 2). Kakeru Amuro. Brother of "Gashadokuro". Helped Yamato when he escaped.
- "Gashadokuro" (hacker) (played by Himari Hitomi. Revealed in ep. 2). Ruka Amuro. Sister of "Tengu". Helped Yamato when he escaped.
- "Zashiki-warashi"
- "Wanyūdō"

=== Story ===
Saburo Musashi transferred to the Police's BCCT section. A hostage incident in a passenger bus. Though Musashi successfully saves the hostages, a bomb carried by the hijacker explodes, and he barely escapes. On another day, Musashi, Sakura Izumi, An Honjo and Yuji Ibuki, his brother-in-law, are at a TV station, where coverage of the elections take place. The candidates have received death threats. One wears an Ayakashi mask. Musashi goes searching for Ibuki, who is nowhere to be found, when a bomb goes off, trapping Musashi in the explosion. The masked team sends out jamming signals and overrides the system, effectively trapping everyone in the station, including Yuko Musashi, Saburo Musashi's wife, who supervises a medical drama, and their daughter Emiri, who finds and is protected by Musashi. Yuko, chased by members of the masked team, finds Izumi and remains by her side. Musashi and Izumi eventually meet and try to get Yuko and Emiri out through the air vent. Ibuki was taken to an abandoned building. In front of him, Koichi Yamato, with his oni mask, appears. Yamato asks Ibuki to kidnap someone, and Ibuki accepts. A police team arrives where Ibuki was held, but he is no longer there. However, there are two burned corpses. Musashi and the others are caught in the middle of a fight with the Ayakashi. Izumi steps between him and his attacker and gets hit by a bullet. Musashi holds a bleeding Izumi in his arms.

Musashi leaves Izumi with Yuko, and takes Emiri to an air duct, giving her a phone for the police. He returns to where Yuko is, but Tengu and Gashadokuro, who had followed him, are there. The Ayakashi take them and Izumi to the main studio with all the hostages, of whom they pick 13, letting the others go. Musashi, wearing the station's mascot suit, is let go, but with a "bomb" on his back. The bomb was a "joke", as a message coming out of it said. Yuko operates on Izumi, while the police find on one of the corpses a QR code that links them to the studio. Members of the News Fact team are forced to prepare to broadcast. Honjo, in charge at HQ, finds how to infiltrate the studio, unbeknownst that the premises were under CCTV surveillance. The first of the Ayakashi's victims, Ryutaro Mikawa, a soccer coach, candidate for governor, is held over a hot water bath, its temperature rising every minute. Musashi, in HQ, is to find his "darkness". Somewhere else, Ibuki drives Yamato to a dry cleaners. The person he is to kidnap is there, but Ibuki betrays Yamato by telling the man he is in danger. Yamato stuns the man, and warns Ibuki not to try that again. The police identify Fukue, the one who kidnapped Ibuki, and Musashi goes after him. Tengu and Gashadokuro take their masks off, after the first reads information on Yamato. They were who helped Yamato when he escaped. After demanding to know Ibuki's whereabouts, Musashi picks up a fox-stamped paper used for Kokkuri dropped by Fukue, then looks up as a rebar starts falling on them.

Fukue was a staff member of the coaching team of which Mikawa was the head coach. Mikawa had physically abused Reo Tsukumi, a student under him. "Amabie", reveals to be his mother, a pharmacy attendant resentful because Mikawa was the cause of her son's death. When Shima investigates who she is, what he gathers includes a security camera's footage that shows a blurred image. Shima then adjusts the image, that shows Yamato. One of the "Ayakashi", Gashadokuro, has been stabbed, and others who were with her went to look for Yuko to save her. Somewhere else, Yamato kidnaps the cleaners' owner and his daughter. Musashi, having to solve the Ayakashi's clue, hidden in a box, is stung and poisoned by the mechanical insect inside it.

Musashi, life count at 90 minutes due to the poison, and in a room with a bomb on the door, continues investigating, while Honjo commands the team in HQ. Governor Oshiba is put under a tub with 70 kilos of content that he has to hold with a rope, or else it will fall and crush him. Yuko operates on Gashadokuro. Ibuki is targeted by Masaki and his daughter. Masaki tells him that Yamato is the "Noppera-bō" of the underworld. During the Ayakashi's broadcast, Kasa-obake uncovers himself. Oshiba had killed his wife, who tried to accuse him of collusion with a construction company. It was also learned that director Hinode was trying to hide Oshiba's crimes through manipulation of news information. The people in 2 related cases whose images were blurred were actually the same person, someone who Hinode knew from college. The Ayakashi who were seeking revenge this time were "Bakeneko" and "Kappa". Oshiba is in a room. Musashi, having been given the antidote, goes there and demands information. Oshiba tells him he doesn't know who is responsible, but that there is a puppeteer (kugutsushi) controlling everything. Oshiba is on a chair that shocks him, and that has a bomb underneath.

Musashi has to investigate Hinode. Honjo orders Shima to investigate anyone who could have infiltrated the police when Yashiro says there is no suspect of Oshiba's electrocution. Meanwhile, the hostages talk among themselves about how Hannya has special considerations for Yuko. Kappa and Bakeneko are in charge of the next "case": Hinode is put in front of a "pie–throwing bazooka" that throws cream and nails. 312 cases of false information generated by Hinode in his 10 years on News Fact, one of them was the death of Kunimitsu Takatsu, a Teito Daily social affairs reporter, who died by jumping into a moving fire truck and being dragged by a spike tire. One week before his death, News Fact aired the news of a peeping Tom in a university's woman's dormitory that hadn't been caught. The suspect's image was Takatsu, and comments started flooding SNS. Musashi's investigation takes him to Sakate, an actor hired by Hinode. Hinode was revealed as the voyeur. Kappa and Bakeneko uncover themselves. They are Takatsu's children. Hinode also had a hidden video of Izumi, planning to use it if she had died. All the hostages, except Yuko, are taken to a sealed room. Somewhere else, Yamato and Ibuki are being held captive by the Noppera-bo (Ayame Masaki declares herself as it). They are rescued by someone wearing a Wanyudo mask. Yamato and Ibuki talk about the chip implanted in Ibuki, that it is not a bomb but a GPS, that is how they were found. Wanyudo finds some files in the Noppera-bo's computers. One of them is marked Kamaitachi. Yamato offered Ibuki the answers he needed, if he joined Yamato and the others. This was 3 months before the capture of the station. Hannya reveals, surprising Yuko and Musashi, as it was Yuko's brother.

Musashi has 2 hours to find the reason why Ibuki became Hannya. The 6 hostages only have 5 masks against the gas that could be liberated in the room. Musashi thinks about what could be the reason, and concentrates on the Kamaitachi incident, occurred 5 years before. In a flashback, more of the relationship between Yamato, the Ayakashi and Ibuki is revealed. Not one trusted Ibuki, who was tested by Tengu with Russian roulette. Yamato told the group to use guns as a way to obtain results, without killing anyone. The day of the occupation, Ibuki faked being kidnapped to deceive the police. Musashi and Amakusa go to the Noppera-bo HQ and find the information on the Kamaitachi incident. Amakusa pulls a gun on Musashi after seeing an email sent by the Noppera-bo to the police. Almost missing the broadcast, Musashi links with Ibuki/Hannya to answer. Musashi tells the truth about Ibuki's girlfriend and Yashiro's involvement. Ibuki's girlfriend, Fuuka Kozu, was accused of killing news reporter Mitsuru Amuro. Yashiro asked Noppera-bo to cover up the case, and make Fuuka the culprit. Musashi's fault was having arrested Fuuka without any proof. Yashiro had also instructed Amakusa to arrest Musashi, since he was the culprit in the Kamaitachi case. Ibuki lets the gas fill the room to prove the falsehood of Shikine, who, after "sacrificing" himself for the others, fights for a mask. A new broadcast starts. Yamato is chained inside a freezer. Musashi is reminded of Emiri being chained inside a freezer truck.
