= Hato no kyūjitsu =

Station identification video for Nippon Television

Hato no kyūjitsu (鳩の休日; lit. Dove's Day Off) was a one-minute-long station identification video that aired on Nippon Television in Japan when the station signed on in the morning and signed off at night.

== History ==
The program began broadcasting on August 28, 1953 in black and white and then when colour television was introduced to Japan on July 1, 1972, it added little colorful doves forming a circle. The video was discontinued on 1 October 2001, but a new version of the video was aired regularly from April 1, 2008 as part of the station's 55th anniversary celebrations.

== Synopsis ==
The video is accompanied by a custom-made orchestra piece (composed by Shirō Fukai), and features three doves, each representing the three televisions networks in Japan at the time (NHK, Nippon Television and TBS). The doves begin to fly off one by one, and eventually, only one dove remains: the one representing Nippon Television.

Although more national television networks began broadcasting, no new doves were added to represent these new networks. Instead, in the 2008 version made for NTV's 55th anniversary, all of the six national TV networks (including TV Asahi, TV Tokyo and Tokyo MX) were represented by the six dots (which form a circle) that were formed in place of the doves.

The video is then followed by standard station identification. This part has changed a few times over the years.

The music to the video was rearranged twice, in 1972 and 1978, the latter of the two was performed by The Yomiuri Nippon Symphony Orchestra.

== Cancellation and reairing ==
Due to reasons unknown, the program was pulled from the air on 2000, and was replaced by a simple station identification program announcing the handover to NNN News 24's overnight simulcast, and also by a static image of NTV's control room. However, the voice for the resumption of this program was strong. Between 2003 and 2008, the analog feed aired a simple animation of the Nippon Television logo forming up. In 2008, as a part of the station's 55th Anniversary celebrations, the clip got a new, shortened version.

Just before midnight on July 24, 2011, the date of Japanese analog television switchoff in most regions, the original (colour) version was broadcast on NTV's analog signal in Tokyo, with the addition of "58年間ありがとうございました" (Thank you for 58 years) to the NTV logo screen. This was not broadcast on other stations affiliated with NNN/NNS, which aired their own station identifications after broadcasting their analog television termination notices.

== Re-cancellation ==
After the celebration of Nippon Television's 60th anniversary, the network rebranded on January 5, 2014, and started airing another simple animation featuring the channel's logo with the slogan "Mitai, Ga sekai o kaete iku (見たい、が世界を変えていく, lit. "Watching will change the world")
