= Seishiro Kato =

Japanese actor (born 2001)

Seishirō Katō
- Born: August 4, 2001 (age 24); Kanagawa Prefecture, Japan
- Years active: 2002–present
- Known for: Higuchi Yoroku (childhood name of Naoe Kanetsugu in Tenchijin
- Relatives: Kenshiro Kato (brother)
- Website: http://www.emimusic.jp/artist/seishiro/

Seishiro Kato (加藤 清史郎, Katō Seishirō; born August 4, 2001 in Kanagawa Prefecture) is a Japanese actor.

In 2002, he debuted when he was 13 months old. He became recognized after his breakthrough role as Higuchi Yoroku (childhood name of Naoe Kanetsugu, as well as Kanetsugu's first son, Takematsu) in Tenchijin the 2009 edition of NHK Taiga Drama. Currently, he is actively appearing in many TV dramas, films, and TV commercials. He will also release a music CD titled Katsuobushi dayo Jinsei wa (かつおぶしだよ人生は; lit. "Life is Like a Dried Bonito") on September 2, 2009.

== Filmography ==
=== Films ===
- The Boy Who Became a Star (星になった少年, Hoshi ni Natta Shōnen) (2005)
- I Won't Cry (なくもんか, Nakumon ka) (2009)
- Zatoichi (2010)
- You are Umasou (film) (2010)
- Ninja Kids!!! (2011) (Rantarō)
- Assassination Classroom: Graduation (2016) as Itona Horibe
- Hakubo (2019) as Yūsuke (voice)
- #HandballStrive (2020)
- The Sun Stands Still (2021) as Yūji Yanagi
- We're Millennials. Got a Problem?: The Movie (2023) as Hirata
- Cells at Work! (2024) as Shin Takeda

=== Japanese dubbing of non-Japanese films ===
- Happy Feet - as Mumble (childhood)
- The Legend - as Ajik
- Where the Wild Things Are - as Max

=== TV dramas ===
- Awaiting Kirin (2020), Prince Sanehito
- Captured Broadcasting Station (2025), Yuji Ibuki
- Water Margin (2026), Ruan Xiaowu

=== Theatre ===
- Les Misérables - Gavroche (2011-2013)
- Elisabeth - Young Rudolf (2012)
- Madama Butterfly - Dolore (2014)
- Love Never Dies - Gustave (2014)
- Kid Victory - Luke (2019)
- Newsies - Davey Jacobs (2020-2024)
- Be More Chill - Michael Mell (2022)
- Death Note: The Musical - Light Yagami (2025)
