= Voice: 110 Emergency Control Room =

2019 Japanese TV series

Japanese name
- Kanji: ボイス 110緊急指令室
Transcriptions
- Revised Hepburn: Boisu hyakutō kinkyū shireishitsu
- Based on: Voice (TV series)
- Starring: Toshiaki Karasawa; Yōko Maki
- Ending theme: "Bad Paradox" by BLUE ENCOUNT
- Original language: Japanese
- No. of episodes: 10

Original release
- Network: Nippon TV
- Release: 13 July – 21 September 2019

Voice 110 Emergency Control Room (Japanese: ボイス 110緊急指令室, romanized: Boisu hyakutō kinkyū shireishitsu) is a 2019 Japanese TV drama series that aired on Nippon TV from 13 July 2019 to 21 September 2019. It is based on the Korean drama series Voice. The series stars Toshiaki Karasawa and Yōko Maki as protagonists Shōgo Higuchi and Hikari Tachibana respectively. A sequel, titled Voice II 110 Emergency Control Room, was later greenlit and aired from 10 July 2021 to 21 September 2021.

A new series, ''Undercover siblings: Special fraud investigators'', which starts on October 5, 2024, unites in a crossover teams from this series and from Captured Hospital/Captured New Airport.

== Premise ==
Three years after his wife's murder, inspector "Mad Dog" Shōgo Higuchi partners with voice profiler Hikari Tachibana to form the Emergency Call Unit (ECU). Tachibana is gifted with exceptional hearing and uses minute audial clues to resolve crises while searching for Higuchi's wife's murderer.

=== Episode list ===
No.	Title	Original release date
1	"Save Lives Within the Time Limit! A Time-Limited Suspense Story Begins..."; Transliteration: "Seigen Jikan Uchi ni Inochi o Sukue! Kesshi no Taimu Rimitto Suspensu ga Maku o Akeru…。" (Japanese: 制限時間内に命を救え! 決死のタイムリミットサスペンスが 幕を開ける…。)	July 13, 2019
2	"What is Hikari's True Purpose in calling Higuchi to the ECU? The ECU is Finally Up and Running!"; Transliteration: "Higuchi o ECU ni Yobiyoseta; Hikari no Shin no Mokuteki to wa Tsuini ECU ga Shidō Saru!" (Japanese: 樋口をECUに呼び寄せた ひかりの真の目的とは!? ついにECUが始動する!)	July 20, 2019
3	"An Ingenious Trap has been Set up in the Case, and it Awaits Higuchi and Hikari as they Get Closer to the Truth!"; Transliteration: "Jiken ni Shikuma reta Kōmyōna Wana ga, Shinsō ni Higuchi to Hikari o Machiukeru!" (Japanese: 事件に仕組まれた巧妙な罠が、 真相に迫る樋口とひかりを待ち受ける!)	July 27, 2019
4	"An Even Greater Evil Awaits Higuchi and Hikari....."; Transliteration: "Higuchi to Hikari no Yukute ni, Saranaru Kyoaku ga Machiukete da……!!" (Japanese: 樋口とひかりの行く手に、 さらなる巨悪が待ち受けていた……!!)	August 3, 2019
5	"The Crisis-time Battle that will Determine the Victim's Life or Death Begins!"; Transliteration: "Higaisha no Seishi o Wakeru; Kuraishisu Taimu no Tatakai ga Hajimaru……!!" (Japanese: 被害者の生死を分ける クライシスタイムの戦いが始まる……!!)	August 10, 2019
6	"Higuchi and Hikari Pursue the Evil that has Taken Root within the Organization, but what Shocking Separation Awaits Them?"; Transliteration: "Soshiki ni Sukuu Aku o Ou Higuchi to Hikari, Sono Sakini Matsu Shōgeki no Wakare to wa……!!" (Japanese: 組織に巣食う悪を追う樋口とひかり、 その先に待つ衝撃の別れとは……!!)	August 17, 2019
7	"The Investigation Network is Disrupted by a Crazed Murderer! Higuchi is Cornered by a "Secret" his Late Wife Harbors..."; Transliteration: "Kyōki no Satsujinki ni Kakuran sa Reru Sōsa-mō! Naki Tsuna ga Kakaeta "Aru Himitsu" ga Higuchi o Oitsumeu……!!" (Japanese: 狂気の殺人鬼に攪乱される捜査網! 亡き妻が抱えた"ある秘密"が 樋口を追い詰める……!!)	August 31, 2019
8	"Higuchi and Hikari Investigate the Mystery of a Mass Disappearance... But, with the Precense of an Unexpected Insider, The ECU is in Danger of Being Disbanded!"; Transliteration: "Shūdan Yukue Fumei no Nazo ou Higuchi to Hikari…… Shikashi, Sōtei-Gai no Naitsū-sha de ECU wa Kaisan no Kiki ni!" (Japanese: 集団行方不明の謎を追う樋口とひかり…… しかし、想定外の内通者の存在で; ECUは解散の危機に!)	September 7, 2019
9	"While Higuchi and Hikari Search for Evidence to Corner Shizuku, Ishikawa's Past is Revealed..."; Transliteration: "Shizuku o Oitsumeru Shōko o Sagasu Higuchi to Hikari no In de Ishikawa no Kako ga Akiraka ni……!!" (Japanese: 雫を追い詰める証拠を探す樋口とひかりの陰で 石川の過去が明らかに……!?)	September 14, 2019
10	"The Time for the Final Battle has Finally Come! The Nightmarish Crisis Time Caused by the Murderer Shizuku Begins..."; Transliteration: "Tsuini Saishū Kessen no Toki! Satsujinki・Shizuku ni Yoru Akumu no Kuraishisu Taimu ga Hajimaru..." (Japanese: ついに最終決戦の時! 殺人鬼・雫による悪夢の クライシスタイムが始まる…)	September 21, 2019

== Cast ==
=== Featured ===
- Toshiaki Karasawa as Shōgo Higuchi
- Yōko Maki as Hikari Tachibana
- Takahisa Masuda as Tōru Ishikawa
- Yūsuke Iseya as Shizuku Hongo

=== Supporting ===
- Kentarō Tamura as Takumi Ogata
- Natsumi Ishibashi as Shiori Morishita
- Yūichi Kimura as Takashi Okihara
- Honoka Yahagi as Aoi Morishita
- Momoko Kikuchi as Miki Higuchi
- Tōru Tezuka as Wataru Uesugi

== Reception ==
The first episode of season one had a viewership of 12.6%, which Korean entertainment company CJ ENM noted was significantly higher than previously aired dramas, while its last episode had a viewership of 12.9%.
