= Ninja Kids!!! =

- Japanese film poster for Ninja Kids!!!
- Directed by: Takashi Miike
- Written by: Yoshio Urasawa
- Based on: Nintama Rantarō by Amako Sobei
- Produced by: Atsushi Terada; Hiroshi Hattori
- Starring: Seishiro Kato
- Cinematography: Nobuyasu Kita
- Edited by: Kenji Yamashita
- Music by: Yoshihiro Ike
- Production company: Sedic International
- Distributed by: Warner Bros. Pictures Japan
- Release dates: July 3, 2011 (New York Asian Film Festival); July 23, 2011 (Japan)
- Running time: 99 minutes
- Country: Japan
- Language: Japanese
- Box office: $3,436,468

Ninja Kids!!! (忍たま乱太郎, Nintama Rantarô) is a 2011 Japanese family-oriented comedy film directed by Takashi Miike. The film is live-action adaptation of the Japanese anime series Nintama Rantarō. The film stars Seishiro Kato as Rantaro who is sent to a ninja training school by his parents. During the summer, they are challenged by a group of rival ninjas which culminates in a race to ring a bell on top of a mountain.

Ninja Kids!!! had its world premiere at the New York Asian Film Festival on July 3, 2011, and was released theatrically in Japan on July 23 where it was the fourth-highest-grossing film in its opening week.

== Plot ==
Set in the Muromachi period in early 16th-century Japan, the young ninja Rantaro (Seishiro Kato) is born into a family of low-ranking ninjas. Rantaro is sent by his father and mother (Shido Nakamura and Rei Dan) to attend the six-year course at a Ninja Academy run by Denzo Yamada (Susumu Terajima). Rantaro's homeroom teacher is Hansuke Doi (Takahiro Miura) and head of the Ninja Girl classes at the school is Shina Yamamoto who appears as either a beautiful young woman (Anne Watanabe) or an older woman (Tamao Nakamura). After going home to his parents' farm for the summer holidays, Rantaro is joined by his schoolmate Shinbei (Futa Kimura) but they later decide to stay with Kirimaru (Roi Hayashi) and teacher Doi. One day, some Usutake ninjas arrive at the house of flamboyant hairdresser Yukitaka Saito (Takeshi Kaga) and his son Takamaru (Takuya Mizoguchi) in order to kill both of them. Yukitaka and Takamaru used to belong to the Uuetake clan, but Rantaro and his friends aim to save them by joining a contest that ends with a race to ring a bell on top of a mountain.

== Cast ==
- Seishiro Kato as Rantaro
- Roi Hayashi as Setsuno Kirimaru
- Futa Kimura as Shinbei Fukutomi
- Mikijirō Hira as Okawa
- Susumu Terajima as Denzo Yamada, academy head
- Takahiro Miura as Hansuke Doi
- Koji Yamamoto as Tobe Shinzaemon
- Furuta Arata as canteen lady
- Anne Watanabe as Shina Yamamoto, as a beautiful young woman
- Tamao Nakamura as Shina Yamamoto, as an old crone
- Takuya Mizoguchi as Takamaru Saito
- Akira Emoto as Usetake ninja Choro
- Renji Ishibashi as Usetake ninja OB
- Yusuke Yamamoto as Suzutakano Yoshiro
- Yuma Ishigaki as Do Sukarasu

== Release ==
Released in 2011, Ninja Kids!!! had its world premiere at the New York Asian Film Festival on July 3, and premiered in Canada at the Fantasia Festival on July 16. After the premiere, negotiations were reported to be underway with a major production company for an American remake of the film. It had its theatrical premiere in Japan on July 23. It was the fourth-highest-grossing film on its opening week in Japan grossing $1,060,634 and has grossed a total of $3,436,468.

== Reception ==
Ninja Kids!!! has received generally positive reviews. Screen Daily gave a positive review, praising the film's energy while noting that "the film may enchant or completely turn off a viewer with its bizarre attempt to give the characters the exact same looks as their animated counterparts". Tradepaper Variety gave the film a favorable review stating that it had "joyous energy that propels its pint-size protagonists through a rapid-fire succession of slapstick gags, each more outrageous than the last". Film Business Asia gave the film a seven out of ten rating, noting that "in the second half, the film loses its initial playfulness and becomes more like rote silly comedy".

Andrew Chan of the Film Critics Circle of Australia wrote that "Ninja Kids!!! is a massive disappointing effort from such a capable director. Sure some fun can be had and the class of kids are fun to watch, but it is only a manner of time before the same antics you once fall for, becomes quite frankly annoying and eventually regrettably bored".

== Sequel ==
A sequel, called Ninja Kids!!! Summer Mission Impossible! (忍たま乱太郎 夏休み宿題大作戦! の段, Nintama Rantarô Natsuyasumi Shukudai Daisakusen! no Dan), was released on July 6, 2013.
