= Hulu Japan =

Japanese video streaming service

Hulu
- Website type: OTT platform
- Available in: Japanese
- Headquarters: Higashi-Shinbashi, Minato, Tokyo, Japan
- Area served: Japan
- Owner: Nippon Television Network Corporation (70%)
- Key people: Tadahisa Dosaka (president)
- Parent: HJ Holdings, Inc. (Nippon Television)
- Website: www.hulu.jp
- Advertising: Yes
- Registration: Required
- Users: ▲2.8 million (as of 5 October 2021)
- Launched: September 1, 2011; 15 years ago
- Current status: Active

Hulu (Note: Japanese: フールー, Hepburn: Fūrū) is a Japanese subscription streaming service operated by HJ Holdings, Inc., a subsidiary of Nippon Television Network Corporation. It originally launched on September 1, 2011, as a localized version of Hulu, the American video-on-demand joint venture between The Walt Disney Company, News Corporation, and NBCUniversal. On February 27, 2014, Hulu's Japanese operations were acquired by Nippon TV and spun off into a distinct, independent entity.

The platform offers an extensive library of over 100,000 titles, including television programming from Nippon TV and other major domestic broadcasters, alongside original productions, international films, foreign series (including a dedicated HBO Max content hub launched in October 2026), and live sports broadcasts. Beyond subscription video streaming, Hulu Japan operates a transactional store (Hulu Store) for digital rentals, stage productions, and pay-per-view live events, as well as an integrated e-comic service launched in October 2025 that allows users to purchase and read digital manga directly within its application and website.

The service has experienced consistent growth since its inception. By March 2015, memberships had reached one million. As of October 5, 2021, Hulu Japan reported a total of 2.8 million subscribers. Furthermore, as of 2022, it ranked as the sixth highest-grossing subscription video-on-demand platform in the Japanese market.

== History ==
=== Founding and establishment ===
On September 1, 2011, Hulu, a video distribution service operating in the United States, launched its first overseas expansion in Japan. Operations in Japan were managed by Hulu Japan GK, a wholly owned subsidiary of Hulu. The company signed content distribution agreements with CBS, NBC, 20th Century Fox, Warner Bros., and The Walt Disney Company. Users were charged a monthly fee of ¥1,480, and unlike in the U.S., no free ad-supported tier was offered.

In January 2012, Hulu Japan began streaming films distributed by Toho-Towa, a Toho subsidiary primarily responsible for releasing Universal Pictures films in Japan. The following month, Hulu Japan signed licensing agreements with six domestic film distributors: Asmik Ace Entertainment, Kadokawa Shoten, Shochiku, Toei, Nikkatsu, and AMG Entertainment.

In April 2012, the monthly subscription fee was reduced to ¥980. As of March 2012, seven months after its launch, the platform's monthly unique visitors exceeded 1.85 million. In November 2013, Hulu Japan announced a partnership with TBS Television to distribute over 3,000 episodes of TBS programming, expanding the platform's catalog to approximately 14,000 episodes.

=== Acquisition by Nippon TV ===
On February 27, 2014, Nippon Television Network Corporation acquired Hulu's Japanese business from Hulu, LLC for an undisclosed amount; through a corporate spin-off, Hulu, LLC established a new company, HJ Holdings GK, which subsequently became a subsidiary of Nippon TV. Under a separate licensing agreement, the service retained the "Hulu" brand and technology in Japan. Following the acquisition, Hulu Japan's Vice Chairman Masafumi Funakoshi stated that he aimed for the service to reach ¥150 billion in revenue by 2020. Even after becoming a Nippon TV subsidiary, Hulu Japan continued to distribute programming from rival broadcasters NHK, TBS Television, and TV Tokyo.

On May 29, 2015, Hulu Japan and Fuji Television entered into a reciprocal content-sharing agreement. Through this partnership, Hulu Japan acquired streaming rights to 20 anime series originally broadcast on Fuji TV's Noitamina block, including Psycho-Pass, Anohana: The Flower We Saw That Day, Library War, and Nodame Cantabile. In exchange, Hulu provided Fuji TV's streaming service, Fuji TV On Demand, with a selection of its foreign television series. Having progressively integrated domestic television programming into its catalog since April 2012, the addition of Fuji TV's content allowed the platform to aggregate programming from NHK and all five major Tokyo-based commercial broadcasting networks.

In June 2015, Hulu Japan released its first original drama series, The Last Cop, a remake of the German television series Der letzte Bulle. In October 2016, a sequel series co-produced with Nippon TV was broadcast on the network. A theatrical continuation, Last Cop: The Movie, was released on May 3, 2017, grossing ¥400 million at the box office.

On February 16, 2016, Hulu Japan signed an exclusive domestic SVOD licensing agreement with the American cable network HBO.

On May 8, 2017, Nippon TV announced a system overhaul of the Hulu Japan streaming service. The update was necessary because, despite the 2014 acquisition, Hulu Japan still shared its backend distribution infrastructure with the U.S. service, preventing Japan-specific modifications. Additionally, the service's web domain was temporarily changed from "hulu.jp" to "happyon.jp" to mitigate technical risks during the system migration and ensure uninterrupted service, before reverting to "hulu.jp" in 2019. However, the sudden URL change caused user confusion regarding a potential rebranding or alteration of the service.

The system migration took place on May 17, 2017, resulting in service disruptions lasting several days. Furthermore, unannounced changes to copyright protection protocols prevented some users with external displays from streaming content. In response, Hulu offered affected users a choice between a one-month free pass, a ¥1,000 Amazon gift certificate, or a ¥1,000 iTunes code. The incident led to the platform's first decline in subscribers since its acquisition by Nippon TV.

In July 2017, HJ Holdings reorganized from a Gōdō gaisha (GK) into a Kabushiki gaisha (Inc.) and conducted a third-party allotment of shares to Hulu, LLC, Yahoo! Japan, Toho, Yomiuri TV, and Chukyo TV. The capital tie-up was executed to strengthen the company's management foundation, enhance content production and procurement, and expand promotional capabilities.

=== Service diversification and partnerships ===
On June 10, 2020, Hulu Japan launched its transactional video-on-demand (TVOD) storefront, Hulu Store, allowing users to rent or purchase recent theatrical releases, latest seasons of foreign dramas, and pay-per-view live concerts. In June 2022, Hulu Japan introduced an in-app "Points" system, enabling users to rent or purchase Hulu Store titles directly within the Android and iOS applications.

On July 12, 2023, Nippon TV and The Walt Disney Company launched a bundled subscription tier combining Hulu Japan and Disney+, titled the "Hulu | Disney+ Set Plan". Priced at ¥1,490 per month at launch, the bundle offered a savings of approximately 26% compared to subscribing to both services individually (¥1,026 for Hulu and ¥990 for Disney+).

On October 15, 2025, Hulu Japan launched an integrated e-comic service within its streaming app and website, allowing users to purchase and read digital manga using their existing Hulu accounts. HJ Holdings introduced the storefront to complement the platform's video catalog, providing users with direct access to the original source material for anime and live-action adaptations streaming on Hulu, such as My Hero Academia, Case Closed (Detective Conan), and Chihayafuru. E-comic transactions are processed through the platform's existing point-based payment system.

On May 27, 2026, Hulu Japan and Walt Disney Japan expanded their partnership by launching a six-month cross-licensing initiative, allowing both platforms to mutually stream select exclusive originals—specifically Hulu's Love You as the World Ends (Season 1) and Pandora's Fruit (Season 1), alongside Disney+'s House of the Owl and the anime series Bullet/Bullet. On June 22, 2026, Hulu Japan entered into a comprehensive partnership with Toho's theatrical division to exclusively live-stream select Toho stage productions on a pay-per-view basis and offer advance ticket lottery windows for SVOD subscribers.

On September 1, 2026, Hulu Japan and Nippon TV entered into a partnership with Warner Bros. Discovery (now Skydance). Starting October 1, 2026, Hulu Japan, along with Prime Video, succeeded U-Next as a distributor of HBO Max in Japan. On Hulu, HBO Max is featured as a dedicated content hub available to subscribers at no additional charge. Additionally, Nippon TV and Hulu Japan are exploring the international distribution of their local content via HBO Max. Furthermore, on September 25, 2026, Hulu Japan and sports streaming platform DAZN announced the "Hulu | DAZN Set Plan", which launched in October 2026 at ¥4,680 per month, offering a discount of over 15% compared to separate subscriptions (¥5,520 combined).

== Content ==
=== Programming ===
Hulu Japan licenses domestic television programming from major Japanese broadcasters, including NHK, TBS Television, Fuji Television, TV Asahi, and TV Tokyo, as well as regional stations such as Yomiuri TV and Chukyo TV.

The platform also produces and distributes exclusive original drama series, variety shows, and spin-off episodes of terrestrial broadcasts in collaboration with its parent company, Nippon Television. For international content, following its October 2026 partnership with Warner Bros. Discovery, the platform hosts an integrated HBO Max hub featuring franchises such as Game of Thrones, The White Lotus, and the upcoming Harry Potter television series. Through its June 2026 partnership with Toho, the platform also streams live theatrical stage productions via Hulu Store.

=== Sports ===
Hulu Japan streams live and on-demand sports, including Japan Rugby League One, B.League basketball, and all home games of the Yomiuri Giants professional baseball team (owned by Yomiuri Shimbun Holdings, the parent company of Nippon Television). Live streaming of all 72 Yomiuri Giants home games began in the 2016 season via feeds provided by "Giants LIVE Stream". In March 2019, alongside 71 Giants home games, Hulu Japan streamed the Major League Baseball (MLB) Opening Series in Tokyo, featuring dedicated player-tracking camera feeds for Ichiro Suzuki and Yusei Kikuchi. In October 2019, the platform provided multi-angle real-time streaming for the 2019 Rugby World Cup, including the pool match between Japan and Scotland. It also streams archival footage of All Japan Pro Wrestling (AJPW) from 1972 to 1999, utilizing broadcast rights held by Nippon Television.

In August 2022, Hulu Japan signed a multi-year domestic streaming agreement with the Dutch football league Eredivisie to broadcast matches from the 2022–23 season onwards, primarily focusing on fixtures featuring AFC Ajax and AZ Alkmaar.

== Features ==
In January 2021, Hulu Japan introduced a "Watch Party" feature (in beta) for web browsers, expanding it to mobile apps on March 18, 2021—marking the first mobile watch party implementation among domestic Japanese streaming services. The feature enables up to eight subscribers to stream SVOD titles simultaneously while communicating via real-time chat. Separately, the platform offers a live chat function for select live sports, concerts, and stage broadcasts on Hulu and Hulu Store. The March 2021 update also introduced picture-in-picture support for iOS devices, double-tap 10-second fast-forward and rewind controls, an intro and ending skip function, and biometric authentication via Face ID and Touch ID.

On September 23, 2026, Hulu Japan upgraded the technical specifications for its pay-per-view live broadcasts on compatible television devices (initially Android TV, Amazon Fire TV, and LG TV, with plans to expand to SVOD live streams). The update increased the maximum stereo audio bitrate from 256 kbps to 448 kbps—matching the highest standard among domestic broadcasting and transactional live-streaming platforms—alongside delivering the highest-bitrate Full HD (1920×1080) video streams in the service's history without raising ticket prices.
