= Kemono =

Kemono (Japanese: ケモノ or 獣, transl. beast) may refer to:

- Bakemono, a class of yōkai, preternatural creatures in Japanese folklore
- Kemonā, a Japanese subcultural term used to describe people who are fond of anthropomorphic animal characters
- Kemonomimi, the concept of depicting human and human-like characters with animal ears, and by extension, other features such as tails and paws

== See also ==
- Furry fandom, a subculture interested in anthropomorphic animal characters
