= Nippon Television =

Japanese television network

JOAX-DTV
- Logo used since 2013

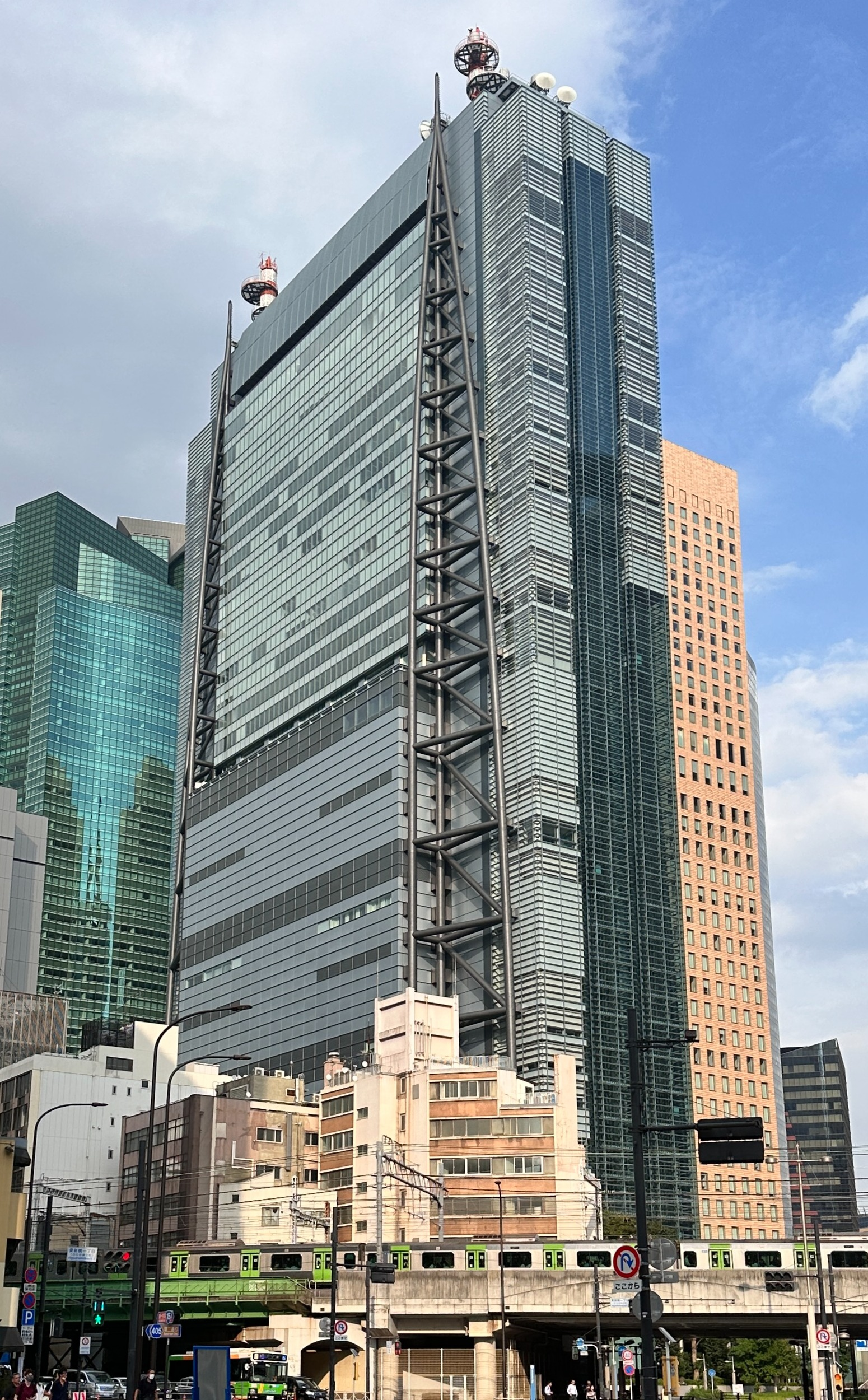
- Headquarters in Shiodome, Minato, Tokyo
- Kantō region; Japan
- City: Tokyo
- Channels: Digital: 25 (UHF); Virtual: 4
- Branding: Nippon TV; NTV

Programming
- Language: Japanese
- Affiliations: Nippon News Network and Nippon Television Network System

Ownership
- Owner: Nippon Television Network Corporation

History
- First air date: August 28, 1953; 73 years ago
- Former call signs: JOAX-TV (1953–2011)
- Former channel numbers: Analog: 4 (VHF; 1953–2011)

Technical information
- Licensing authority: MIC
- ERP: 10 kW (68 kW ERP)
- Transmitter coordinates: 35°39′31″N 139°44′44″E

Links
- Website: ntv.co.jp

Corporate information
- Native name: 日本テレビ放送網株式会社
- Romanized name: Nihon Terebi Hōsōmō Kabushiki-gaisha
- Type: Subsidiary KK
- Industry: Media
- Founded: April 26, 2012; 14 years ago (as Nippon Television Network Preparatory Corporation)
- Headquarters: Shiodome, Minato, Tokyo, Japan
- Area served: Japan, United States, Western Europe, East Asia
- Key people: Yoshikuni Sugiyama (president and COO); Hiroyuki Fukuda (chairman and CEO)
- Owner: Nippon Television Holdings
- Subsidiaries: NTV Group Planning; Nippon Television International Corporation; Nippon Television Network Europe B.V.; Forecast Communications; HJ Holdings; Madhouse (95%, with Sony Pictures Japan); Studio Ghibli (42.3%)
- Website: www.ntv.co.jp/info; www.ntv.co.jp/english/

JOAX-DTV (channel 4), branded as Nippon Television (Note: Japanese: 日本テレビ, Hepburn: Nihon Terebi; commonly abbreviated as Nittere (日テレ)) (NTV) or Nippon TV, is a Japanese television station serving the Kantō region as the flagship station of the Nippon News Network and the Nippon Television Network System. It is owned and operated by the Nippon Television Network Corporation (Note: Japanese: 日本テレビ放送網株式会社, Hepburn: Nihon Terebi Hōsōmō kabushiki gaisha), a wholly owned subsidiary of the certified broadcasting holding company Nippon Television Holdings.

Nippon Television's studios are in the Shiodome area of Minato, Tokyo, Japan, and its transmitters are in the Tokyo Skytree. Broadcasting on channel four since its inception, it was the first commercial broadcaster in Asia, and broadcasts terrestrially across Japan. Nippon Television is the home of the syndication networks NNN (for news programs) and NNS (for non-news programs). Except for Okinawa Prefecture, (Note: Currently, OTV & RBC are airing certain programs from Nippon Television) these two networks cover the whole of Japan. Nippon Television is one of the "five private broadcasters based in Tokyo".

With 14.45% of the company's shares, Nippon Television Holdings is partially owned by The Yomiuri Shimbun Holdings – Japan's largest media conglomerate by revenue domestically, and second largest worldwide behind Sony. (Note: The Yomiuri Shimbun Holdings is the largest media conglomerate by revenue in Japan, while Sony is Japan's largest media conglomerate by worldwide media/entertainment revenue.) It forms part of Yomiuri's main television broadcasting arm alongside Kansai region flagship Yomiuri Telecasting Corporation, which owns a 6.57% share in the company. (Note: Both The Yomiuri Shimbun Holdings and Nippon Television Holdings own shares in nearly all affiliate stations of NNN/NNS.) It owns Hulu Japan, formerly part of the US-based Hulu streaming service, and has shares in animation studios Madhouse, Tatsunoko Production and Studio Ghibli, and in the film studio Nikkatsu.

== History ==
=== Early stages ===
In 1951, US Senator Karl Mundt (known as the key proponent of Voice of America) announced that commercial television would be set up in Japan, then under United States-led Allied Occupation of Japan. According to Japanese-Canadian writer Benjamin Fulford, Mundt recommended Matsutarō Shōriki to the CIA, which later hired Shōriki as an agent under the codenames "PODAM" and "POJACKPOT-1". With executives of The Asahi Shimbun and Mainichi Shimbun, Shōriki persuaded Prime Minister Shigeru Yoshida to form a commercial television network in Japan.

On July 31, 1952, Nippon Television was granted the first commercial TV broadcasting license in Japan. The Nippon Television Network Corporation was established in October of that year. After obtaining the broadcasting license, Nippon Television purchased land for the construction of its headquarters building (now the Kojimachi branch office) in Nibanchō, Chiyoda, Tokyo, and began preparations for the broadcast of TV programs. Due to equipment delivery delays, broadcasting trials were significantly delayed, resulting in NHK being first to broadcast TV programs. On August 24, 1953, Nippon Television started broadcast trials, and four days later, began to air programs as Asia's first commercial broadcaster. It used an animated dove spreading its wings in the logo on its first sign-on. The first TV commercial (for Seikosha clocks) was aired at that time; reports say it aired upside-down by mistake.

Due to high prices, television sets were not widely available at the launch of NTV and NHK. In an effort to broaden advertisement impact, NTV installed 55 street TVs in the Kanto area. This program was a huge success, attracting 8,000 to 10,000 people to watch sports broadcasts such as professional baseball and sumo wrestling.

Plans for expansion to the whole of Japan were halted, as NTV's license was restricted to the Kanto area. As a result, the Yomiuri Shimbun Group filed for a separate license in Osaka under the name Yomiuri TV.

In 1955, Shōriki stepped down as president of NTV after being elected to the House of Representatives. The election was the first to be covered by commercial TV in Japan.

=== Nippon News Network and launch of color broadcasts ===
With the Ministry of Posts and Telecommunications issuing a large number of new TV licenses in the late 1950s, Yomiuri Shimbun and Nippon Television began to establish stations outside the Kanto area. On August 28, 1958, Yomiuri TV started broadcasting, marking the start of expansion into the Kansai area. Due to the close partnership between Nippon TV and the Yomiuri Shimbun, the network's expansion was opposed by local newspapers, and slower than that of the Japan News Network affiliates, which were less newspaper-oriented. Before 1958, NTV's programming was seen on CBC and OTV, whose television broadcasts began on December 1, 1956. The four commercial television stations that existed at the time broadcast a special program called The Coming Year, which ran until the end of the Shōwa era. Until the last edition, production rotated between the main Kanto stations.

On the fifth anniversary of NTV's launch, Yomiuri TV and Television Nishinippon started broadcasting; Nishinippon Broadcasting, which started earlier, created a precursor of the Nippon News Network. In December, when Tokai Television started broadcasting in the Tōkai region, NTV programs moved to the new station.

Following TBS Television's establishment of the Japan News Network in 1959, Nippon Television founded the second Japanese television network, Nippon News Network, on April 1, 1966, with a 19 affiliated stations as founding members. (Note: Founding members include The Sapporo Television Broadcasting, Aomori Broadcasting Corporation, Akita Broadcasting System, Yamagata Broadcasting, Sendai Television (currently part of FNN/FNS), Fukushima Television (currently part of FNN/FNS), NTV, Yamanashi Broadcasting System, Kitanihon Broadcasting, Fukui Broadcasting, Nagoya TV (currently part of ANN), Yomiuri TV, Nihonkai Telecasting, Hiroshima TV, Yamaguchi Broadcasting, Shikoku Broadcasting, Nishinippon Broadcasting, Nankai Broadcasting, and Kochi Broadcasting) Nippon Television founded the Nippon Television Network System in 1972 to improve collaboration among network stations in non-news programming. On September 15, 1959, Nippon Television's stock was listed on the Tokyo Stock Exchange, becoming the first media company in Japan to list its stock.

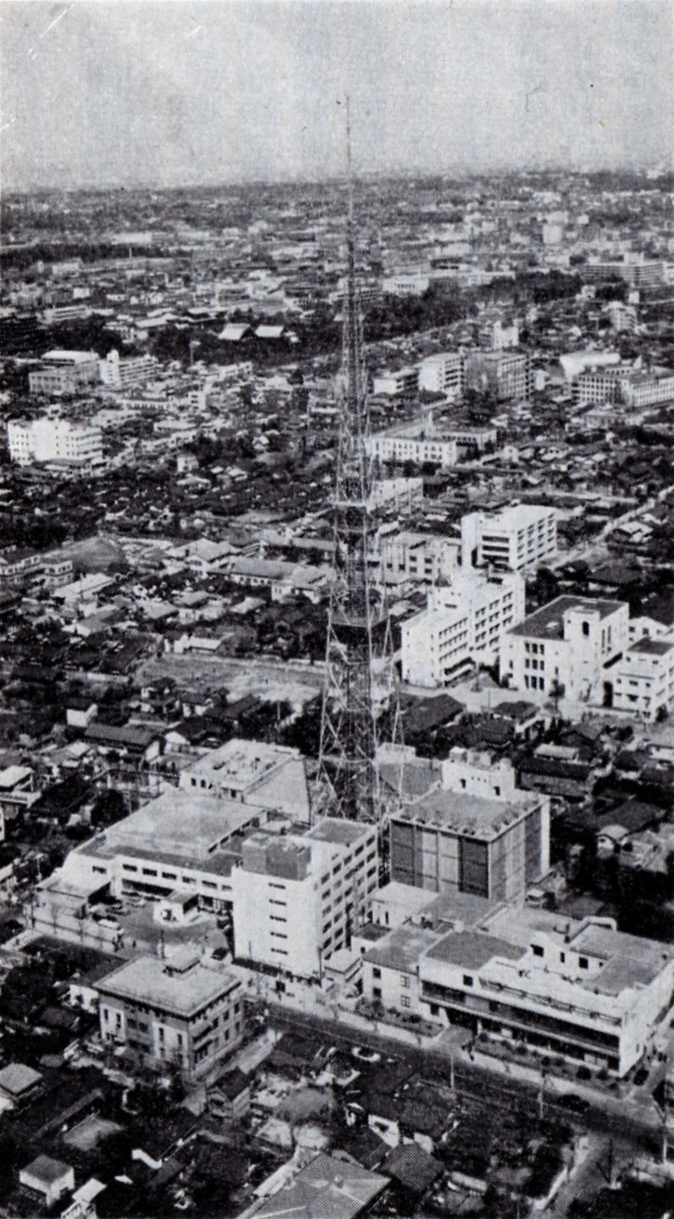
Nippon TV's headquarters in 1961

Nippon Television applied to the Ministry of Posts and Telecommunications in April 1957 for a color television broadcast license, which it received in December of that year. Matsutarō Shōriki returned to Nippon TV as president after resigning as the minister of state in 1958. He increased investment in color television. In December 1958, NTV introduced videotape recording in a one-off drama series using American RCA 2-inch quad tape.

The first color live coverage broadcast in Japan was the wedding of the crown prince (now Emperor Emeritus Akihito) on April 10, 1959, together with the first TV program with commercials broadcast in color. In December, NTV aired Japan's first color VTR broadcast, Perry Como's Kraft Music Hall from NBC (United States). NTV later obtained a license for broadcasting programs in color on September 10, 1960. In one year, NTV aired a total of 938 hours of color programming. Programs produced in black and white steadily decreased.

In October 1963, Nippon Television successfully trialed overnight broadcasts. On November 22, 1963, using a communication satellite relay, NTV conducted the first black-and-white TV transmission experiment between Japan and the United States during coverage of the Assassination of John F. Kennedy. On July 1, 1966, The Beatles' concert at the Nippon Budokan, part of their Japanese tour, was shown in color on NTV (prerecorded on tape); the viewing rate reached 56 percent.

After the death of Matsutaro Shoriki on October 9, 1969, NTV and NHK agreed to integrate signal transmission facilities in the Tokyo Tower.

=== 1970s–1980s ===
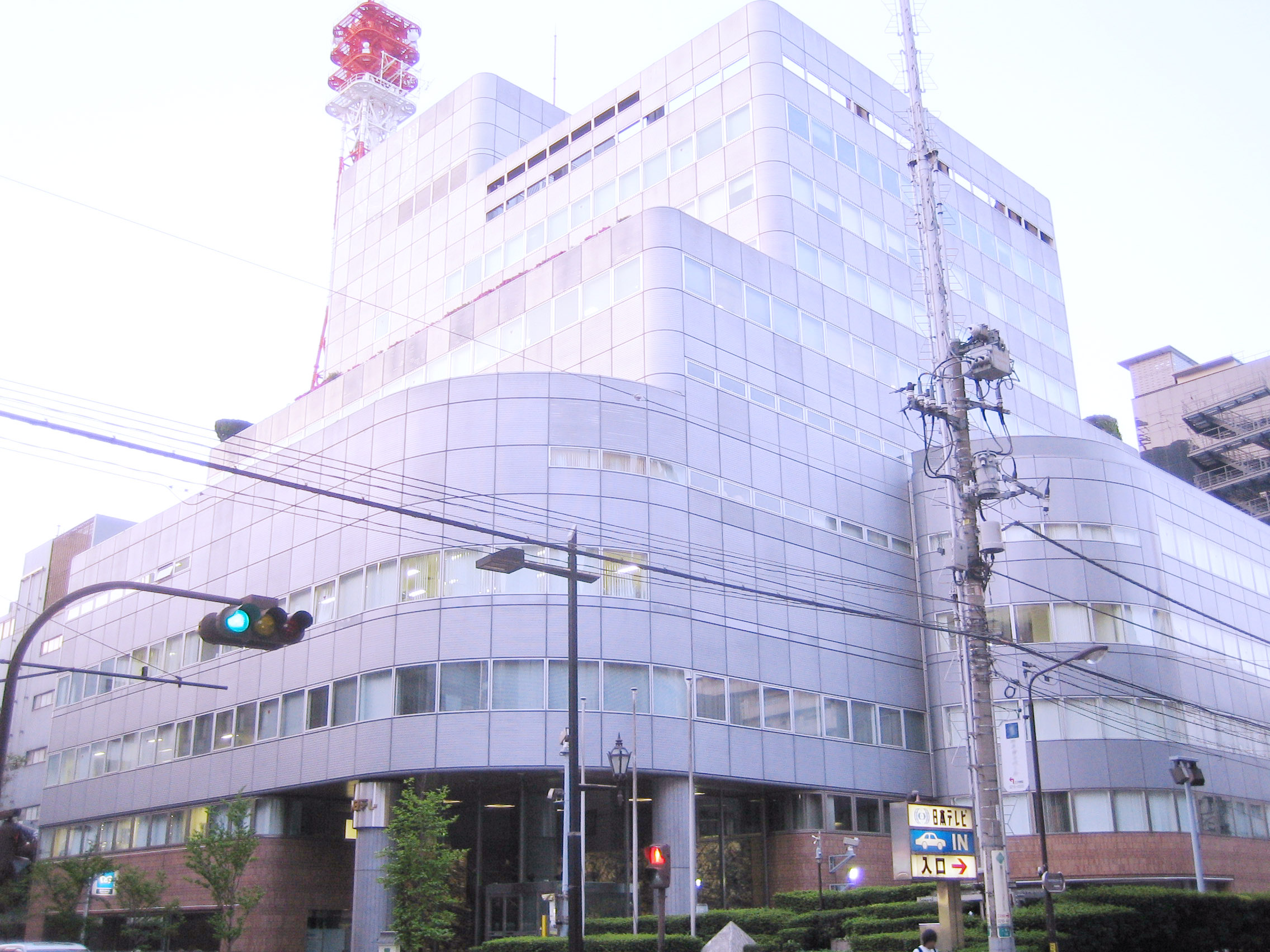
The former headquarters of Nippon TV in Kojimachi, Chiyoda, Tokyo from 1978 to 2004

When Kobayashi Shōriki (son-in-law of Matsutarō Shōriki) took over Nippon TV in 1969, he continued progress in color broadcasting. In April 1970, color programs accounted for 76.4% of total broadcast time, ahead of NHK which was second with 73%. In October 1971, all Nippon TV programs were in color.

During this period, due to economic depression and the discovery of the falsification of financial reports by the Ministry of Finance, Nippon TV was in recession. Ratings of other Japanese commercial TV stations also declined during that period, from competing with Fuji TV for second place in the core bureau for most of the 1960s to competing with Fuji Television and NET TV (currently TV Asahi), and then being pulled away from TBS. This led Kobayashi Shōriki to launch business reforms to promote the outsourcing of program productions and to build a new headquarters, enabling the company to turn a profit in 1972.

The non-news counterpart of Nippon News Network, Nippon Television Network System, was formed on June 14, 1972. NTV had also been successful in exporting its programs around the world; programs such as The Water Margin and Monkey aired on the BBC in the UK. On January 14, 1973, NTV aired the live satellite relay in Japan for Elvis Presley's concert in Hawaii. Shown in two parts on October 8 and 15, 1975, the classic film Gone with the Wind made its world television premiere on NTV, 13 months before NBC aired it in North America.

Nippon TV started diversifying its operations, opening subsidiaries such as Nippon TV Music, Union Movies, and Nippon Television Services in the early 70s.In the following years, Nippon TV participated in cultural events, such as the restoration of the Sistine Chapel ceiling in 1984,which took 13 years and cost to ¥2.4 billion; it also held two special exhibitions at the Vatican Museums. On March 9, 1984, Dan Goodwin used suction cups to climb the 10-floor Nippon Television Kojimachi Annex in Chiyoda in a paid publicity event.

On the 25th anniversary of Nippon Television's first broadcast in 1978, the broadcaster launched 24 Hour Television: Love Saves The Earth. It was the only telethon on Japanese TV, and achieved high ratings; it continues to be aired today. In the 1980s, ratings continued to decline as Fuji TV and TBS promoted their primetime programming. This prompted NTV to increase the airtime of news programs and baseball events. Multichannel television sound broadcasting began in December 1982, using the EIAJ MTS standard. In 1987, NTV launched NTV Cable News (now known as Nippon TV NEWS 24), the first news channel in Japan.

At the end of 1989, it teamed up with TVNZ's Dunedin unit to provide assistance for the coverage of the first sunrise of the 1990s, at Manukau Point in the Chatham Islands of New Zealand. An estimated ten million viewers were expected to watch the live broadcast on the network.

=== 1990s ===
Hayao Miyazaki of Studio Ghibli, Inc. designed Nippon Television's mascot character Nandarō (なんだろう; lit. What Is It?) to commemorate the channel's 40th anniversary in 1993.

Although ratings of Nippon TV affiliates increased, advertising revenue decreased in 1992 due to the collapse of the Japanese asset price bubble. After Seiichiro Ujiie, a former journalist at the Yomiuri Shimbun, became president of Nippon TV, the broadcaster carried out major changes in its programming to boost ratings, such as airing late night news programs earlier than competitors and ending certain primetime variety shows. These changes helped NTV become number one in ratings from 1993 to 1994, overtaking Fuji TV. It previously had attempted to replace its afternoon 'wide shows' with comedy programs to compete with rival networks. The number of affiliates increased to 30 after Kagoshima Yomiuri Television started broadcasting in 1994.

In 1996, Nippon TV launched its first cable-exclusive channel, CS Nippon TV.

=== 2000s–present ===
At the start of the 2000s, Nippon TV and its 29 affiliates won the triple crown ratings. (Note: Triple Crown Ratings are ratings for All Day (6 am to 12 am the following day), Primetime (7 pm to 11 pm), and Golden Hours (7 pm to 10 pm).) In December 2000, Nippon TV launched the satellite-exclusive channel BS NTV. On April 30, 2003, to celebrate its 50th anniversary, Nippon TV held a completion ceremony at its headquarters in Shiodome, Tokyo, which had taken seven years to build. In October 2000, employees of the network bribed surveyed households to increase their ratings, especially impacting ratings for baseball games. Fuji TV took advantage of the incident when, becoming number one in ratings. Nippon TV started digital broadcasting on December 1, 2003. It moved to Shiodome in February 2004, and also started high-definition production. With the rising trend for internet services, Nippon TV launched Dai2 Nippon TV, the first video-on-demand service from a commercial broadcaster in Japan.

Analog broadcasting ended on July 24, 2011, and NTV fully entered the digital TV era. Also in 2011, Nippon TV regained the triple crown ratings after eight years, due to high ratings of the drama I'm Mita, Your Housekeeper. In 2012 and 2013, the triple crown was taken by TV Asahi because of its primetime programming. Nippon TV later regained the triple crown ratings in 2014. As of 2022, Nippon TV has held the triple crown rating for 12 years.

On April 26, 2012, the Nippon Television Network Preparatory Corporation was founded as part of a major reorganization. On October 1, the Nippon Television Network Corporation became a certified broadcasting holding company, Nippon Television Holdings, Inc.; the Nippon Television Network Preparatory Corporation took over the Nippon Television Network Corporation name.

On February 1–2, 2013, Nippon TV collaborated with NHK to air a special program on the first TV broadcasts 60 years before. On February 27, 2014, Nippon TV acquired the Japanese division of Hulu, Hulu Japan. The network started airing more programs exclusively on Hulu following its acquisition, which was criticized by viewers.

In 2015, Nippon TV and the other four commercial broadcasters in Japan launched TVer, a free on-demand service. In the fourth quarter of 2020, live online streaming of NTV started to be trialed on TVer. In September 2020, Nippon TV and PricewaterhouseCoopers collaborated to create a system using artificial intelligence to predict audience ratings; it was first trialed on its movie block Friday Roadshow. In the fourth quarter of 2021, the broadcaster officially started live online streaming of its channel. Despite inclusion in trials the year before, the late-night news program News Zero and its succeeding program were excluded from streaming.

On October 6, 2023, Nippon Television purchased a majority stake in Studio Ghibli; NTV began to handle management, while the studio continued to focus on creative efforts.

== Branding ==
When Nippon Television started in 1953, its English acronym "NTV" was used as its first corporate logo; a colored version was used starting in 1972 after the launch of color broadcasting. The logo was designed by Shōjirō Takada, an assistant professor at Tokyo University of the Arts. In 2003, Nippon TV launched a new corporate logo with the introduction of the broadcaster's mascot Nandarō. The orange dot in the 2003 logo represented the sun, and the character "日" in gold represented tradition. It was designed by Jun'ichi Fumura, an employee of the broadcaster. On January 1, 2013, Nippon TV changed its logo as part of its 60th anniversary, with the "日" kanji changed to the number "0" with a diagonal line inside, to represent starting from zero and starting anew. The change was inspired by the on-screen clock, usually located in the upper left corner of the screen.

Wordmark used from 1953 to 2003

First logo used from 1953 to 1978

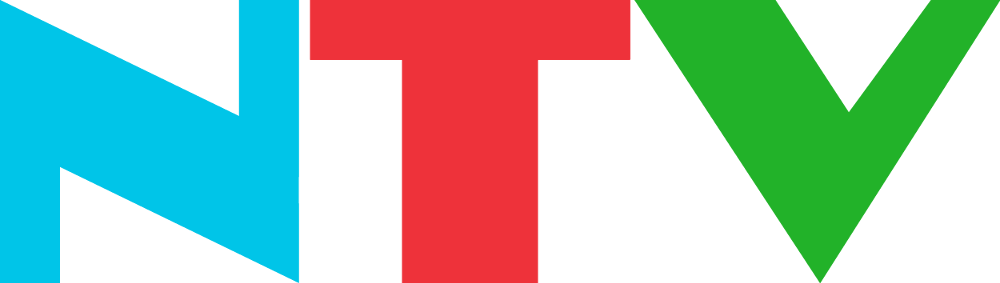
Colored version used from 1972 to 1978, though also used in color promos in the 60s. This logo was used again once on the analog shutdown in 2011.

Second logo used between 2003 and 2013. The logo shown here is the version without Nandarou.

Current logo since 2013

60th Anniversary logo in 2013

=== Mon logo ===
In 1978, as part of its 25th anniversary, Nippon Television introduced a mon in addition to the corporate trademark. The logo was designed with the NTV's "sun" and the earth represented by the Mercator projection, symbolizing NTV's leading position in the television industry.The logo is colored blue, representing clear skies. It was designed by Masahiro Touzawa, an employee of the broadcaster.

Monsho from 1978 to 2001

=== Mascots ===
On August 28, 1992, as part of its 40th anniversary, Nippon Television invited Hayao Miyazaki to design its first mascot. The mascot was shaped like a mouse with the tail of a pig, symbolizing creativity, curiosity, and hard work. A campaign was held for the audience to nominate names for the mascot, and 51,026 names were voted on. The winning name was "Nandarō", literally translating to "What is it?" The mascot was supposed to be used for one year only, but was used until 2013 due to audience popularity. It was replaced by Da Bear, introduced in 2009.

== Affiliates ==
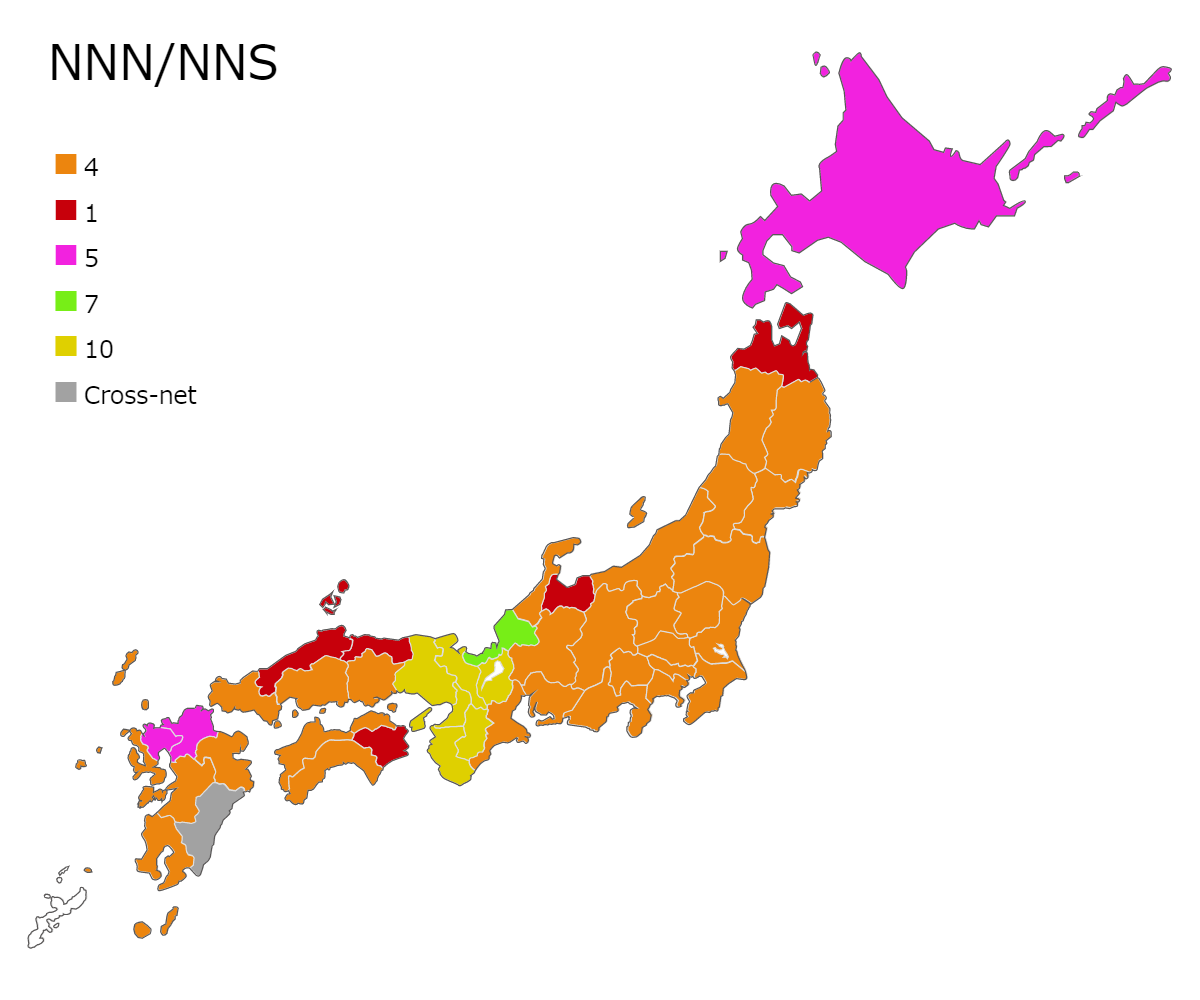
LCN assignments of NNN/NNS affiliates

After the launch of Japan News Network in April 1960, a new group of networks was supposed to be formed between Sendai Television, Nagoya TV, NTV, and Hiroshima Telecasting in 1962. In 1963, Nishinippon Shimbun, a key shareholder of Television Nishinippon, disagreed with Yomiuri Shimbun's plans to expand in Fukuoka Prefecture. This resulted in Television Nisihinippon withdrawing from Nippon TV and losing Nippon TV's local news base in Kyushu. On April 1, 1966, Nippon News Network was formally launched with 19 founding members. (Note: Initial members include Sapporo TV, Aomori Broadcasting, Akita Broadcasting System, Yamagata Broadcasting, Sendai Television (currently part of FNN/FNS), Fukushima TV (currently part of FNN/FNS), Nippon TV, Yamanashi Broadcasting, Kitanihon Broadcasting, Fukui Broadcasting, Nagoya TV (currently part of ANN), Yomiuri TV, Nihonkai Telecasting, Hiroshima TV, Yamaguchi Broadcasting, Shikoku Broadcasting, Nishinippon Broadcasting, Nankai Broadcasting, and Kochi Broadcasting)

The non-news counterpart of Nippon News Network, Nippon Television Network System, was formed on June 14, 1972.

== TV programs ==
=== News ===
- Zip! (morning news directed by Ami K)
- News Every (evening news)
- News Zero (late-night news)
- NNN News 24 (24-hour news channel)

=== Former Japanese dramas ===
==== 2000s ====
- Ruri no Shima (瑠璃の島, 2005)
- Kikujirou to Saki 2 (菊次郎とさき 2, 2005)
- Joou no Kyoushitsu (女王の教室, 2005)
- Gokusen (ごくせん, 2002/2005/2008)
- Ai no Uta (あいのうた, 2005)
- Nobuta wo Produce (野ブタ。をプロデュース, 2005)
- Hana Yori Dango (花より男子, 2005)
- Kami wa Saikoro wo Furanai (神はサイコロを振らない, 2006)
- Kui-tan (喰いタン, 2006)
- Gyarusaa (ギャルサー, 2006)
- Primadem (プリマダム, 2006)
- CA to Oyobbi! (CAとお呼びっ!, 2006)
- My Boss My Hero (マイ☆ボス マイ☆ヒーロー, 2006)
- 14-year-old Mother (14才の母, 2006)
- Tatta Hitotsu no Koi (たったひとつの恋, 2006)
- Enka no Joou (演歌の女王, 2007)
- Haken no Hinkaku (ハケンの品格, 2007)
- Kuitan 2 (喰いタン, 2007)
- Bambino! (バンビ～ノ!, 2007)
- Sexy Voice and Robo (セクシーボイスアンドロボ, 2007)
- Juken no Kamisama (受験の神様, 2007)
- Hotaru no Hikari (ホタルノヒカリ, 2007)
- Tantei Gakuen Q (探偵学園Q, 2007)
- Yukan Club (有閑倶楽部, 2007)
- Hataraki Man (働きマン, 2007)
- Dream Again (ドリーム☆アゲイン, 2007)
- Binbou Danshi (貧乏男子 ボンビーメン, 2007)
- Saitou-san (斉藤さん, 2008)
- One-pound Gospel (1ポンドの福音, 2008)
- Osen (おせん, 2008)
- Hokaben (ホカベン, 2008)
- Gakkō ja Oshierarenai! (学校じゃ教えられない！, 2008)
- Seigi no Mikata (正義の味方, 2008)
- Yasuko to Kenji (ヤスコとケンジ, 2008)
- Oh! My Girl (オー！マイ・ガール！！, 2008)
- OL Nippon (OLにっぽん, 2008)
- Scrap Teacher (スクラップ･ティーチャー, 2008)
- Kami no Shizuku (神の雫, 2009)
- RESET (リセット, 2009)
- Zeni Geba (銭ゲバ, 2009)
- Moso Shimai (妄想姉妹, 2009)
- Kiina (キイナ, 2009)
- Aishiteiru (アイシテル, 2009)
- The Quiz Show (ザ・クイズショウ, 2009)
- Samurai High School (サムライ・ハイスクール, 2009)

==== 2010s ====
- Mother (2010)
- Kinoshita Bucho to Boku ((木下部長とボク), 2010)
- Magerarenai Onna (曲げられない女, 2010)
- Misaki NO.1!! (美咲ナンバーワン!!, 2011)
- Deka Wanko (デカワンコ, 2011)
- Sayonara Bokutachi no Youchien (さよならぼくたちのようちえん, 2011)
- Kono Sekai no Katasumi ni (この世界の片隅に, 2011)
- Kaseifu no Mita (家政婦のミタ, 2011)
- Himitsu Chouhouin Erika (秘密諜報員_エリカ, 2011)
- Deka Kurokawa Suzuki (デカ_黒川鈴木, 2012)
- Dirty Mama! (ダーティ・ママ!, 2012)
- Konna no Idol Janain!? (こんなのアイドルじゃナイン!?, 2012)
- Perfect Son (理想の息子, 2012)
- Sūgaku Joshi Gakuen (数学女子学園, 2012)
- Teen Court: 10-dai Saiban (ティーンコート, 2012)
- Cleopatra na Onnatachi (クレオパトラな女たち, 2012)
- Shiritsu Bakaleya Koukou (私立バカレア高校, 2012)
- Taburakashi (たぶらかし, 2012)
- Ghost Mama Sousasen (ゴーストママ捜査線, 2012)
- Sprout (スプラウト, 2012)
- Totkan Tokubetsu Kokuzei Choshukan (トッカン_特別国税徴収官, 2012)
- Vision: Koroshi Ga Mieru Onna (VISION_殺しが見える女, 2012)
- Akumu-chan (悪夢ちゃん, 2012)
- Sugarless (シュガーレス, 2012)
- Tokyo Zenryoku Shoujo (東京全力少女, 2012)
- Muse no Kagami (2012)
- Share House no Koibito (シェアハウスの恋人, 2013)
- 35-sai no Koukousei (35歳の高校生, 2013)
- Hakuba no Ōji-sama (ハクバノ王子サマ, 2013)
- Gakkō no Kaidan (学校のカイダン, 2015)
- Marumaru Tsuma (○○妻), 2015)
- Majisuka Gakuen4 (マジすか学園4, 2015)
- Jimi ni Sugoi! Kōetsu Girl: Kouno Etsuko (2016)
- Kyabasuka Gakuen (2016)
- Your Home Is My Business! (家売るオンナ, 2016)
- Your Home Is My Business! Returns (帰ってきた家売るオンナ, 2017)
- You Don't Know Gunma Yet (2017)
- Voice: 110 Emergency Control Room (2019)
- Your Home Is My Business!: 2nd Attack (家売るオンナの逆襲, 2019)
- Innocence, Fight Against False Charges (2019)
- Nurse in Action!! (2019)

==== 2020s ====
- Captured Hospital (2023)
- Captured New Airport (2024)

=== Variety and music ===
- Question for one hundred million people!? Waratte Koraete! (1億人の大質問!?笑ってコラえて!)
- Guruguru Ninety Nine (Gurunai, ぐるぐるナインティナイン, ぐるナイ)
- Sekaiichi Uketai Jugyo (世界一受けたい授業) (until March 2024)
- Enta no Kamisama ~the god of Entertainment~ (エンタの神様 ~the god of Entertainment~)
- Sekai Marumie! TV Tokusoubu (世界まる見え!テレビ特捜部)
- The! Tetsuwan! DASH!! (ザ!鉄腕!DASH!!)
- Gyoretsu no dekiru Horitsu Sodanjo (行列の出来る法律相談所)
- Shōten (笑点, continuously broadcast since May 1966).
- Gaki no tsukai (DownTown's Gaki no Tsukai ya Arahende!!, ガキの使いやあらへんで!!)
- Cartoon KAT-TUN (カートゥンKAT-TUN, Kātūn Katūn?)
- AKBingo!
- Gyosen x Maetake's Geba Geba 90 minutes (巨泉×前武ゲバゲバ90分！)
- Curriculumachine (カリキュラマシーン)
- Music Lovers
- God of Music (音楽の神様)
- 1 Oku 3000 mannin no Shō Channeru (until March 2024)
- With Music

==== Former ====
- Family Wisdom of the Itos (伊東家の食卓)
- Nazo o toke! Masaka no Mistery (謎を解け!まさかのミステリー)
- Magical Zunou Power!! (マジカル頭脳パワー!!) (1990s)
- Tokujo! Tensei Shingo (特上!天声慎吾)
- Dotch Cooking Show (どっちの料理ショー, Yomiuri Telecastiong Corp.)
- Arashi no Shukudai-kun (嵐の宿題くん)
- Arashi ni Shiyagare (嵐にしやがれ)

=== Animation ===
The company has close connections with Studio Ghibli, led by Hayao Miyazaki. Nippon TV has funded all of the company's productions since Kiki's Delivery Service (excluding Earwig and the Witch, which was fully funded by rival NHK) and holds the exclusive Japanese rights to broadcast their motion pictures. It has also produced and broadcast popular anime series like My Hero Academia, Claymore, Death Note, Hajime no Ippo, Creamy Mami and Kimagure Orange Road; as well as Detective Conan and Inuyasha (which are produced through its Osaka affiliate, Yomiuri TV). NTV produced the first, unsuccessful Doraemon anime in 1973; the second, more successful Doraemon series premiered in 1979 on TV Asahi, which remains the franchise's broadcaster to this day. NTV also produced a second anime adaptation of Hunter × Hunter. NTV has also been broadcasting the yearly Lupin III TV specials since 1989, which they co-produce with TMS Entertainment. Nippon Television announced on February 8, 2011, that it would make the anime studio Madhouse its subsidiary after becoming the primary stockholder at about 85%, via a third-party allocation of shares for about 1 billion yen (about US$12 million).

On January 29, 2014, Nippon Television announced that it would purchase a 54.3% stake in Tatsunoko Production and adopt the studio as a subsidiary.

=== Special TV programs ===
- Kin-chan and Shingo Katori's All Japan Costume Grand Prix (欽ちゃん&香取慎吾の全日本仮装大賞)
- 24 Hour Television: Love Saves The Earth (24時間テレビ「愛は地球を救う」, annual telethon on the TV stations of NNS). For 2024's edition, the theme of the program changed to "Will Love Save the Earth?" (24時間テレビ47 「愛は地球を救うのか？」), and 24 hosts were chosen instead of a main personality.
- Trans America Ultra Quiz (アメリカ横断ウルトラクイズ)
- All Japan High School Quiz Championship (全国高等学校クイズ選手権)
- Nippon Television Music Festival (日本テレビ音楽祭)

== Notable person ==
- Matsutarō Shōriki (founder)

== List of most-watched films ==
The following is a list of the most-watched films of all time on NTV, as of June 2007.

Rank	Film	Rating	Airing date
1	Spirited Away	46.9%	2003-01-24
2	Princess Mononoke	35.1%	1999-01-22
3	Howl's Moving Castle	32.9%	2006-07-21
4	Harry Potter and the Philosopher's Stone	30.8%	2004-06-25
5	Tsuribaka Nisshi 4	28.4%	1994-02-04
6	Tsuribaka Nisshi 6	28.3%	1994-12-23
7	Tsuribaka Nisshi 2	27.7%	1995-01-13
8	Tora-san's Forbidden Love	27.6%	1996-08-09
9	Shall We Dance?	27.4%	1997-03-28
10	Tsuribaka Nisshi 5	27.1%	1994-09-16
11	Indiana Jones and the Temple of Doom	26.9%	1987-10-16
12	Menkyo ga Nai!	26.9%	1995-03-03
13	Tsuribaka Nisshi 8	26.1%	1997-10-24
14	Titanic	26.1%	2003-06-28
15	Abunai Deka Forever	25.7%	1998-08-28
16	First Blood	25.3%	1985-10-25
17	The Matrix	25.1%	2003-06-06
18	Lupin III: Dragon of Doom	24.9%	1994-07-29
19	Death Note	24.5%	2006-10-27
20	Kiki's Delivery Service	24.4%	1990-10-05

== See also ==
- Television in Japan
- Japanese media
- Hato no kyūjitsu (Dove's Day Off), NTV's station identification
