= BS NTV =

Japanese satellite television channel

- Logo used since 2014
- Type: Satellite television network
- Country: Japan
- Headquarters: Shiodome, Minato, Tokyo

Programming
- Language: Japanese
- Picture format: HDTV 1080i

Ownership
- Owner: BS Nippon Corporation

History
- Launched: 1 December 2000; 25 years ago

Links
- Website: www.bs4.co.jp (in Japanese)

BS NTV (BS日テレ, BS Nittere), also known as BS4, is a Japanese satellite television channel owned by BS Nippon Corporation (株式会社BS日本, Kabushiki-gaisha Bīesu Nihon), a subsidiary of Nippon Television Holdings. It is one of the satellite counterparts of the commercial television networks.

== History ==
The channel, like its commercial competitors, started coinciding with the launch of digital satellite broadcasts in Japan. In 2009, BS NTV carried limited highlights of the Pacific League in English on Monday nights.

On January 1, 2014, coinciding with a move in its facilities for fiscal 2014, BS NTV introduced a new logo, aligning itself with the parent terrestrial outlet. 4K broadcasts started on September 1, 2019, ahead of the 2019 Rugby World Cup, held in Japan.

== Controversies ==
In October 2023, it was announced that a total of 165 people were not drawn or shipped in a giveaway project held on five programs including "Golf Survival". The station apologized, saying that "it was a human error caused by the person in charge's forgetfulness", and would strengthen its internal reviewing system to prevent further problems. The channel also stated that it would promptly draw and ship the tickets.
