= Radio Nippon =

Radio station in Yokohama, Japan

JORF
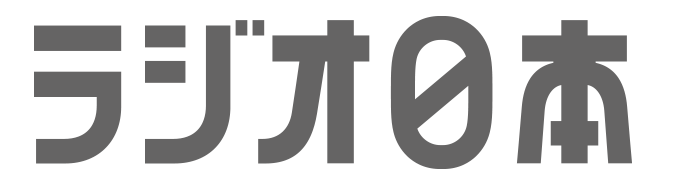
- Logo used since 2019

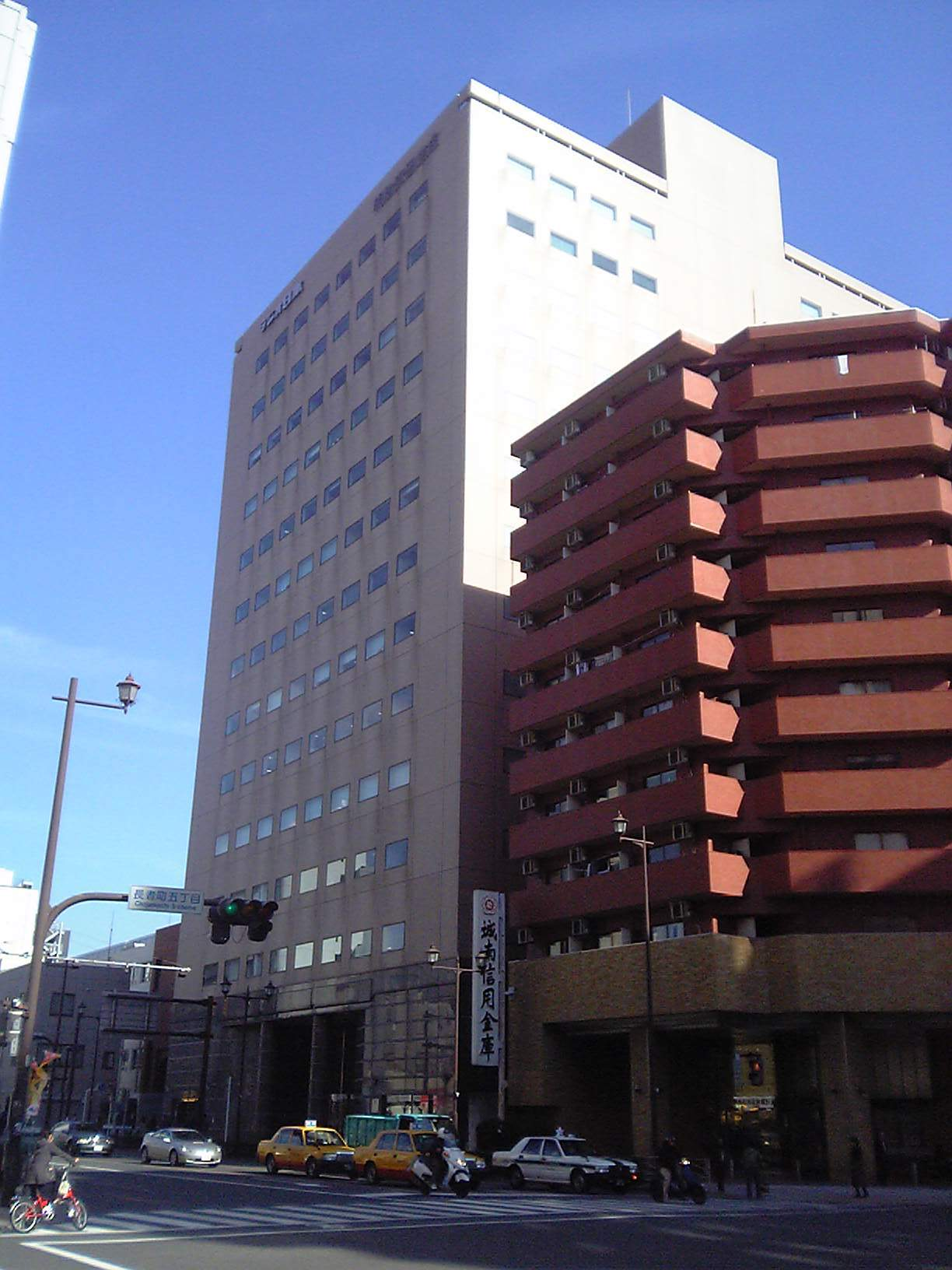
- Headquarters in Naka-ku, Yokohama
- Yokohama; Japan
- Broadcast area: Kantō region
- Frequencies: 1422 kHz (AM); 92.4 MHz (FM)
- Branding: Radio Nippon

Programming
- Language: Japanese
- Affiliations: Independent

Ownership
- Owner: RF Radio Nippon Co., Ltd.

History
- First air date: December 24, 1958; 67 years ago
- Former names: Radio Kanto (1958-1982)

Technical information
- Licensing authority: MIC
- Power: 50,000 watts 5,000 watts
- ERP: 41,000 watts

Links
- Website: www.jorf.co.jp

RF Radio Nippon Co., Ltd. (株式会社アール・エフ・ラジオ日本, Kabushiki-gaisha Āru Efu Rajio Nippon), formerly Radio Kanto Co, Ltd. is a local AM radio station in Yokohama, Kanagawa Prefecture, Japan.

== Offices ==
- The Headquarters: 5-85, Chōjamachi, Naka-ku, Yokohama, Kanagawa Prefecture, Japan
- Tokyo Office: 2-2-1, Azabudai, Minato, Tokyo, Japan

== Broadcasting ==
- Station: Yokohama
  - Call sign: JORF
  - Frequency: AM 1,422 kHz
  - Output: 50 kW
  - Frequency: FM 92.4 MHz
  - Output: 5 kW
  - ERP: 41 kW
  - Transmitter: Harris DX-50
- Station: Odawara
  - Call sign: JORL
  - Frequency: AM 1,485 kHz
  - Output: 1 kW
