= Yasunori Yamada =

Japanese anime screenwriter

Yasunori Yamada (山田 靖智, Yamada Yasunori) is a Japanese anime screenwriter.

== Works ==
- series head writer denoted in bold

=== Television ===
- Flower Witch Mary Bell (1992)
- The Brave Express Might Gaine (1993)
- Calimero (1993)
- Brave Police J-Decker (1994)
- Slayers (1995)
- The Brave of Gold Goldran (1995)
- El-Hazard: The Wanderers (1995-1996)
- Those Who Hunt Elves (1996)
- Brave Command Dagwon (1996)
- Slayers NEXT (1996)
- Slayers TRY (1997)
- Those Who Hunt Elves 2 (1997)
- Maze (1997)
- Vampire Princess Miyu (1997-1998)
- **Lost Universe** (1998)
- Record of Lodoss War: Chronicles of the Heroic Knight (1998)
- Mamotte Shugogetten (1998)
- Sorcerous Stabber Orphen (1998-1999)
- Sorcerous Stabber Orphen 2: Revenge (1999-2000)
- Boys Be... (2000)
- Baki the Grappler (2001)
- **A Little Snow Fairy Sugar** (2001-2002)
- Ai Yori Aoshi (2002)
- Petite Princess Yucie (2002-2003)
- Divergence Eve (2003)
- The Galaxy Railways (2003-2004)
- Misaki Chronicles (2004)
- Daphne in the Brilliant Blue (2004)
- Basilisk (2005)
- Mahoraba ~Heartful Days~ (2005)
- **Comic Party Revolution** (2005): eps 5-13
- **Karin** (2005-2006)
- Angel Heart (2005-2006)
- Love Get Chu: Miracle Seiyū Hakusho (2006)
- Animal Yokocho (2006)
- **Tsuyokiss Cool x Sweet** (2006)
- BakéGyamon (2006-2007)
- **The Galaxy Railways II: Crossroads to Eternity** (2006-2007)
- Strain: Strategic Armored Infantry (2006-2007)
- **Venus Versus Virus** (2007)
- Idolmaster: Xenoglossia (2007)
- Sky Girls (2007)
- Bakugan Battle Brawlers (2007-2008)
- Slayers REVOLUTION (2008)
- Yozakura Quartet (2008)
- **Net Ghost PiPoPa** (2008-2009)
- Slayers EVOLUTION-R (2009)
- **Juden Chan** (2009)
- Ladies versus Butlers! (2010)
- **Motto To Love Ru** (2010)
- Fortune Arterial (2010)
- Bakugan Battle Brawlers: New Vestroia (2010-2011)
- Bakugan: Gundalian Invaders (2011)
- R-15 (2011)
- Maken-ki! (2011)
- Manyū Hiken-chō (2011)
- Problem Children Are Coming from Another World, Aren't They? (2013)
- A Certain Scientific Railgun S (2013)
- Haiyore! Nyaruko-san W (2013)
- Maken-ki! Two (2014)
- Absolute Duo (2015)
- The Testament of Sister New Devil BURST (2015)
- Turning Mecard (2015-2016)
- Battle Spirits: Burning Soul (2015-2016)
- **Hybrid x Heart Magias Academy Ataraxia** (2016)
- Battle Spirits: Double Drive (2016-2017)
- Twin Star Exorcists (2016-2017)
- **Elegant Yokai Apartment Life** (2017)
- My Girlfriend is Shobitch (2017)
- Ongaku Shōjo (2018)
- Didn't I Say to Make My Abilities Average in the Next Life? (2019)
- Gundam Build Divers Re:Rise (2019-2020)
- Uzaki-chan Wants to Hang Out! (2020)
- WIXOSS Diva (A)Live (2021)
- Onipan! (2022)
- Alice Gear Aegis Expansion (2023)
- **Cultural Exchange with a Game Centre Girl** (2025)
- **Kujima: Why Sing, When You Can Warble?** (2026)
- **Dara-san of Reiwa** (2026)

=== OVAs ===
- Deadman Wonderland: Wielder of the Red Knife (2011)
- The Testament of Sister New Devil DEPARTURES (2018)
