= Kiyomitsu Mizuuchi =

Japanese voice actor

- 水内 清光
- Born: Osaka Prefecture, Japan
- Occupation: Voice actor
- Years active: 1993-present
- Agent: Ken Production

Kiyomitsu Mizuuchi (水内 清光, Mizuuchi Kiyomitsu) is a Japanese voice actor.

== Filmography ==
=== Television animation ===
- Cowboy Bebop (1998) as Gang B; Police 2; Security
- Mobile Suit Gundam SEED (2002) as Modine (ep 37); Representative Homura
- Yakitate!! Japan (2004) as Doctor
- Naruto (2005) as Hokushin
- Onihei (2017) as Chūsuke Sajima
- Legend of the Galactic Heroes: Die Neue These (2018) as Staden
- The Fable (2024) as Matsu
- Narenare: Cheer for You! (2024) as YJ
- City the Animation (2025) as Ii Hito

Unknown date

- Berserk as Aide (Ep. 4); Follower (Ep. 5); General B (Ep. 11)
- Boogiepop Phantom as Teacher (eps 2, 3)
- Chrono Crusade as Police Inspector (ep 1,2)
- Dirty Pair Flash as SCC Computer
- Dominion as Golfer
- Ergo Proxy as Iggy
- Getbackers as insurance company man (ep 10)
- Gravion as Angle
- Gundam Evolve as Mazaku/Hadou Musha Mazaku
- Knight Hunters Eternity (ep 7)
- Lupin III: Stolen Lupin as Hakuryuu
- Magical Shopping Arcade Abenobashi as Banker Kashiwagi
- Mobile Suit Gundam SEED Destiny as Representative Homura (ep 20)
- No-Rin as Kiichi Nakazawa
- R.O.D the TV as Language Teacher (ep. 6)
- Shrine of the Morning Mist as Client (ep 18)
- Stratos 4 (TV) as Mania #3; Mikaze's father
- Sukeban Deka

=== OVA ===
- Stratos 4 (????) (Otaku D)

=== ONA ===
- Pluto (2023) (Schelling)
- Fool Night (2026) (Jin Hiragishi)

=== Video games ===
- Batman: Arkham Knight (2015, Japanese dub) (James Gordon)
- Resident Evil 7: Biohazard (2017, Japanese dub) (Alan Douglas)

=== Tokusatsu ===
- Uchu Sentai Kyuranger (2017) as Dogyun (ep 32)

=== Dubbing ===
- Frank Grillo
  - Captain America: The Winter Soldier (Brock Rumlow)
  - Captain America: Civil War (Brock Rumlow)
  - Avengers: Endgame (Brock Rumlow)
  - Copshop (Teddy Murretto)
- The Art of Self-Defense (Henry (David Zellner))
- C.B. Strike (Jerry Waldegrave (Dominic Mafham))
- Das Experiment (Schütte (Oliver Stokowski))
- Donnie Darko (Jim Cunningham (Patrick Swayze))
- Fires (Duncan Simpson (Richard Roxburgh))
- Fortitude (Professor Charlie Stoddart (Christopher Eccleston))
- Indiana Jones and the Temple of Doom (2009 Wowow edition) (Mola Ram (Amrish Puri))
- Interstellar (Principal (David Oyelowo))
- Logan (Zander Rice (Richard E. Grant))
- Mindscape (Robert (Richard Dillane))
- Mission: Impossible – Ghost Protocol (Anatoly Sidorov (Vladimir Mashkov))
- Night at the Museum: Secret of the Tomb (Archibald Stanley (Matt Frewer))
- Out for a Kill (Ed Grey (Corey Johnson))
- Resident Evil: Extinction (Dr. Alexander Isaacs (Iain Glen))
- Resident Evil: The Final Chapter (Dr. Alexander Isaacs (Iain Glen))
- Santa's Slay (Grandpa (Robert Culp))
- Thirteen Days (Robert McNamara (Dylan Baker))
- Transformers: Age of Extinction (Drift)
- Vincenzo (Han Seung-hyuk (Jo Han-chul))
