= Kujima: Why Sing, When You Can Warble? =

Japanese manga series

- First tankōbon volume cover

クジマ歌えば家ほろろ (Kujima Utaeba Ie Hororo)
- Genre: Comedy
- Manga
- Written by: Akira Konno
- Published by: Shogakukan
- Imprint: Monthly Shōnen Sunday Comics
- Magazine: Monthly Shōnen Sunday
- Original run: September 10, 2021 – April 12, 2024
- Volumes: 5
- Anime television series
- Directed by: Noriyuki Nomata; Shinichiro Kimura (series director)
- Written by: Yasunori Yamada
- Music by: Manami Kakudō
- Studio: Studio Hibari
- Licensed by: Crunchyroll; Medialink
- Original network: AT-X, Tokyo MX, MBS, BS-TBS
- Original run: April 9, 2026 – June 25, 2026
- Episodes: 12
- icon

Kujima: Why Sing, When You Can Warble? (Japanese: クジマ歌えば家ほろろ, Hepburn: Kujima Utaeba Ie Hororo; lit. 'If Kujima Sings, the House Gurgles') is a Japanese manga series written and illustrated by Akira Konno. It was serialized in Shogakukan's shōnen manga magazine Monthly Shōnen Sunday from September 2021 to April 2024, with its chapters collected in five tankōbon volumes. A 12-episode anime television series adaptation produced by Studio Hibari aired from April to June 2026.

== Plot ==
In his first year of middle school, Arata Kōda encounters a strange creature named Kujima. The Kōda household is on edge due to the stress of their eldest son preparing for entrance exams, so when Kujima enters, it brings fresh air and begins to calm the tension.

== Characters ==
Kujima (クジマ)
Voiced by: Yuria Kōzuki
Arata Kōda (鴻田 新, Kōda Arata)
Voiced by: Ayumu Murase
Suguru Kōda (鴻田 英, Kōda Suguru)
Voiced by: Yōhei Azakami
Miyoshi Kōda (鴻田 みよし, Kōda Miyoshi)
Voiced by: Ryoko Shiraishi
Masaomi Kōda (鴻田 正臣, Kōda Masaomi)
Voiced by: Hirofumi Nojima
Makoto Mitsuki (三ツ木 真琴, Mitsuki Makoto)
Voiced by: Nene Hieda

== Media ==
=== Manga ===
Written and illustrated by Akira Konno, Kujima: Why Sing, When You Can Warble? was serialized in Shogakukan's shōnen manga magazine Monthly Shōnen Sunday from September 10, 2021, to April 12, 2024. Shogakukan collected its chapters in five tankōbon volumes, released from April 12, 2022, to May 10, 2024.

==== Volumes ====
No.	Japanese release date	Japanese ISBN
1	April 12, 2022	978-4-09-851092-4
2	October 12, 2022	978-4-09-851328-4
3	May 12, 2023	978-4-09-852051-0
4	November 10, 2023	978-4-09-853027-4
5	May 10, 2024	978-4-09-853316-9

=== Anime ===
In May 2024, an anime adaptation was announced. It was later revealed to be a television series produced by Studio Hibari and directed by Noriyuki Nomata, with Shinichiro Kimura serving as the series director, Yasunori Yamada writing the scripts, Sakurako Mitsuhashi designing the characters, and Manami Kakudō composing the music. It was broadcast for 12 episodes from April 9 to June 25, 2026, on AT-X and other networks. The opening theme song is "Komorebizaka" (木漏れ日坂; lit. 'Sunlight Through the Trees'), performed by Galileo Galilei, while the ending theme song is "Hororo Shōyō" (ほろろ逍遥; lit. 'Warble Ramble'), performed by Manami Kakudo. Crunchyroll is streaming the series. Medialink licensed the series.

==== Episodes ====
No.	Title	Directed by	Written by	Storyboarded by	Original release date
1	Transliteration: "Hajimete no Burin wa Katamari ni Naru" (Japanese: 初めてのブリンは塊になる)	Atsuko Tonomizu	Yasunori Yamada	Shinichiro Kimura	April 9, 2026
2	Transliteration: "U no Mane o Suru Karasu" (Japanese: 鵜の真似をする烏)	Akira Mano	Yasunori Yamada	Shinichiro Kimura	April 16, 2026
3	Transliteration: "Onaji Hane no Tori wa Umarenai" (Japanese: 同じ羽根の鳥は生まれない)	Yusuke Kamuta	Yasunori Yamada	Shinichiro Kimura	April 23, 2026
4	Transliteration: "Etchou Hokushi ni Sukū" (Japanese: 越鳥北枝に巣くう)	Hazuki Mizumoto	Yasunori Yamada	Shinichiro Kimura	April 30, 2026
5	Transliteration: "Uso Kara Deta Makoto" (Japanese: 嘘から出た実)	Atsuko Tonomizu	Yasunori Yamada	Shinichiro Kimura	May 7, 2026
6	Transliteration: "Ichi-Fuji, Ni-Kujima, San-Nasubi" (Japanese: 一富士 二クジマ 三茄子)	Akira Mano	Yasunori Yamada	Shinichiro Kimura	May 14, 2026
7	Transliteration: "Shu ni Majiwareba Akakunar" (Japanese: 朱に交われば赤くなる)	Hiromi Takenouchi & Takaari Satō	Yasunori Yamada	Shinichiro Kimura	May 21, 2026
8	Transliteration: "Oboreru Mono wa Wara o mo Tsukamu" (Japanese: 溺れる者は藁をも掴む)	Masaki Kitamura & Akira Mano	Yasunori Yamada	Shinichiro Kimura	May 28, 2026
9	Transliteration: "Kanashimi wa Umi de wa Nai Kara Sukkari Nomihozeru" (Japanese: 悲しみは海ではないからすっかり飲み干せる)	Masaki Kitamura & Shinichiro Kimura	Yasunori Yamada	Shinichiro Kimura	June 4, 2026
10	Transliteration: "Waga yo no Haru" (Japanese: 我が世の春)	Akira Mano	Yasunori Yamada	Shinichiro Kimura	June 11, 2026
11	Transliteration: "Kujima Utaeba Ie Hororo" (Japanese: クジマ歌えば家ほろろ)	Atsuko Tonomizu & Kōsei Satō	Yasunori Yamada	Shinichiro Kimura	June 18, 2026
12	Transliteration: "Me Kara Tōku Naru to Kokoro ni Chikaku Naru" (Japanese: 目から遠くなると心に近くなる)	Hazuki Mizumoto & Shinichiro Kimura	Yasunori Yamada	Shinichiro Kimura	June 25, 2026

== Reception ==
The series was nominated for the 2022 Next Manga Award in the print manga category and placed 18th out of 50 nominees. Alongside Fool Night and Nippon Sangoku, Kujima: Why Sing, When You Can Warble? ranked twelfth in the 2023 edition of Takarajimasha's Kono Manga ga Sugoi! list of best manga for male readers. The manga ranked ninth in the "Nationwide Bookstore Employees' Recommended Comics of 2023" survey answered by bookstore clerks in Japan; it was ranked twelfth in the 2024 survey. It received the Bookstore Staff Award of the eBookJapan Manga Award 2023. It ranked sixth for the second Crea Nighttime Manga Award in 2023.
