= Elegant Yokai Apartment Life =

Japanese light novel series and its adaptations

- The first volume of the light novel

妖怪アパートの幽雅な日常 (Yōkai Apāto no Yūga na Nichijō)
- Genre: Supernatural
- Light novel
- Written by: Hinowa Kōzuki
- Published by: Kodansha
- Imprint: YA!ENTERTAINMENT
- Original run: October 2003 – August 2013
- Volumes: 11
- Manga
- Written by: Hinowa Kōzuki
- Illustrated by: Waka Miyama
- Published by: Kodansha
- English publisher: NA: Kodansha USA (digital)
- Magazine: Monthly Shōnen Sirius
- Original run: November 9, 2011 – August 26, 2021
- Volumes: 24
- Anime television series
- Directed by: Mitsuo Hashimoto
- Written by: Yasunori Yamada
- Music by: Shigeo Komori
- Studio: Shin-Ei Animation
- Licensed by: Crunchyroll
- Original network: Tokyo MX, ytv, BS11
- English network: SEA: Animax Asia
- Original run: July 3, 2017 – December 25, 2017
- Episodes: 26
- Manga

Elegant Yokai Apartment Life: Peru Arc
- Written by: Hinowa Kōzuki
- Illustrated by: Waka Miyama
- Published by: Kodansha
- Magazine: Monthly Shōnen Sirius
- Original run: December 24, 2021 – October 24, 2025
- Volumes: 9

Elegant Yokai Apartment Life (妖怪アパートの幽雅な日常, Yōkai Apāto no Yūga na Nichijō) is a Japanese light novel series by Hinowa Kōzuki. Kōzuki first released the light novel in 2003, and concluded it in 2009 within 10 volumes (and a later side-story collection in 2013). An anime television series adaptation by Shin-Ei Animation aired from July to December 2017.

== Plot ==
High school freshman Yūshi Inaba is forced to look for new place to live after his high school's dormitory burnt down. Having no parents and wanting to live independently from his uncle, he eventually finds a cheap apartment for 25,000 yen called Kotobuki-sō, only to find out that the place has human and supernatural creatures such as ghosts, yōkai, and mononoke living together. There, Yūshi's new daily life begins.

== Characters ==
Yūshi Inaba (稲葉 夕士, Inaba Yūshi)
Voiced by: Atsushi Abe
Yūshi is a high school freshman who lost his parents in a car accident three years prior to the story, and has been living with his uncle and his family who don't seem to want him. Having determination to live independently, Yūshi chooses JTB, a school with a dormitory. But the school's dormitory burned down and forced him to search for a temporary place to live for 6 months, where he found Kotobuki-sō. After living there, Yūshi gains the ability to heal others by absorbing their injuries. He seems to look like a family together with Hase and Kuri. This sometimes gives off some homoromantic vibes.
Mizuki Hase (長谷泉貴, Hase Mizuki)
Voiced by: Yuichi Nakamura
Yushi's childhood best friend and classmate. Hase comes from a rich family and is quite smart and cunning, his deviousness is often used for comic relief. He is well liked by the residents of the apartment as he often brings them many gifts, he likewise respects the many adults found there as proper examples of maturity rather than people who suck up to him because of his status. He is very fond of Kuri to the point he is referred to as his "Daddy" by the residents which in turn causes them to call Yushi the "Mommy" much to his dismay.
Akine Kuga (久賀 秋音, Kuga Akine) / Mayuko Suzuki (鈴木 まゆこ, Suzuki Mayuko)
Voiced by: Miyuki Sawashiro
Akine is an easy-going resident in room 204, she goes to Takinodai High School and works as an exorcist at night in a hospital. "Akine Kuga" is the name she uses as a psychic.
Reimei Isshiki (一色 黎明, Isshiki Reimei)
Voiced by: Akira Ishida
A resident at room 102, Reimei is a famous poet and fairytale writer. Nobody knows his real name and despite being a male, he refers to himself as "Atashi", a more feminine form of "Watashi".
Akira Fukase (深瀬 明, Fukase Akira)
Voiced by: Kazuya Nakai
A resident in room 103. Akira is a painter who owns a dog named Cigar.
Ryū (龍)
Voiced by: Toshiyuki Morikawa
A resident in room 203, although it seems he has another home, Ryū is a psychic with considerable power. He is respected both by the spiritual creatures in the apartment and human alike.
Fool (フール, Fool)
Voiced by: Takehito Koyasu
Secondhand Bookshop Employee (古本屋, Furuhon'ya)
Voiced by: Tomokazu Sugita
Antiquary (骨董屋, Kottō-ya)
Voiced by: Shō Hayami
Sato (佐藤さん, Satou san)
Voiced by: Koji Yusa
Mariko (まり子, Mariko)
Voiced by: Kotono Mitsuishi
Takako Tashiro (田代隆子, Tashiro Takako)
Voiced by: Kaede Okutani
Yushi's first friend in high school and member of the same club he is in.
Naomi Chiaki (千晶直美, Chiaki Naomi)
Voiced by: Toshihiko Seki
A new teacher in Yushi's school who is on his 30s. He is usually laid back, carefree and easygoing. While it looks like he is being irresponsible, in truth he trusts the students and often lets small matters go unpunished or allow late students to come in, which results him in being quite popular especially amongst troublemakers. He will, however get angry and scold the alumni when needed and will go as far as putting on a front of strict behavior in order to coerce students to behave better, well aware that he may be misunderstood. He is well liked by Yushi's class, especially him and Tashiro, the latter having a crush on him.
Haruka Aoki (青木春香, Aoki Haruka)
Voiced by: Fumiko Orikasa
A new teacher in Yushi's school. A woman of elegance and refined mannerisms, it is said by The Fool that she has an imperturbable aura, very much like Ryu has although she does not seem to be a psychic. Although she has good intentions at heart her overprotective, one-sided view of things leads her to assume things above the students based on sheer prejudice like believing Yushi was suffering and in need of affection due to his family situation, despite the fact he is moving onwards with his life with the residents of the apartment, or believing Yamamoto was bullied by the English Club for leaving crying for a fight she started. This in turn leads many students very angry without her knowledge, but decide to simply go with the flow as they know trying to convince her will be pointless. Yushi notes that when compared to Ryu's strict but present kindness, Aoki's is uncalled and irresponsible.
Konatsu Yamamoto (山本小夏, Yamamoto Konatsu)
Voiced by: Rie Kugimiya
A student at Yushi's school who recently joined the English Club. She is quite short, bespectacled and has very long black hair. Konatsu has deep emotional problems and a severe inferiority complex with her older sister, given Konatsu was often sick this had led her to believe she was overprotected and given a different treatment in comparison to her academically and socially excelling sister. This in turn has made her to thrive to excel by any means possible in order to show her independence, showing off her intelligence whenever she can and trying to look smarter than she actually is. This has made her socially ostracized, very difficult to interact with and emotionally unstable as she will often try to belittle others while burst in tears when called out for her behavior.
Kuri (クリ) and Shiro (シロ)
Voiced by: Rie Kugimiya (Kuri) & Mutsumi Tamura (Shiro)
Kuri and Shiro are a pair of a child and dog ghosts who always seen together. Kuri is a young toddler who was killed by his own mother when she was driven crazy by the fact that her boyfriend had left her (due to her pregnancy), and Shiro is a stray dog who wanted to take care of Kuri. A running gag is that Hase is referred to as his "Daddy" while Yushi is by proxy his "Mommy" by the residents.

== Media ==
=== Light novel ===
Hinowa Kōzuki first published the series in 2003 through Kodansha's YA!ENTERTAINMENT. It concluded in 2013 with a total of 10 volumes and 1 side stories compilation volume. Kadokawa Bunko later republished the series in 2008 until 2014 with renewed art.

=== Manga ===
A manga adaptation by Waka Miyama was serialized in Kodansha's shōnen manga magazine Monthly Shōnen Sirius from May 26, 2011, to August 26, 2021. Kodansha collected its chapters in twenty-four tankōbon volumes, released from November 9, 2011, to January 7, 2022.

Kodansha USA are publishing the manga in English in a digital format.

A spin-off manga, titled Elegant Yokai Apartment Life: Peru Arc (妖怪アパートの幽雅な日常 ペルー編, Yōkai Apāto no Yūgana Nichijō perū-hen), was serialized in the same magazine from December 24, 2021, to October 24, 2025. The first volume was published on July 7, 2022. It is titled number 25 as a sequel series.

==== Volume list ====
No.	Original release date	Original ISBN	North America release date	North America ISBN
1	November 9, 2011	978-4-06-376310-2	August 29, 2017	978-1-68-233862-9
2	May 9, 2012	978-4-06-376343-0	September 26, 2017	978-1-68-233920-6
3	November 9, 2012	978-4-06-376370-6	November 21, 2017	978-1-68-233972-5
4	April 9, 2013	978-4-06-376394-2	December 19, 2017	978-1-64-212053-0
5	November 8, 2013	978-4-06-376429-1	January 16, 2018	978-1-64-212054-7
6	April 9, 2014	978-4-06-376457-4	April 17, 2018	978-1-64-212184-1
7	November 7, 2014	978-4-06-376508-3	May 22, 2018	978-1-64-212244-2
8	March 9, 2015	978-4-06-376527-4	November 20, 2018	978-1-64-212541-2
9	July 9, 2015	978-4-06-376554-0	December 18, 2018	978-1-64-212601-3
10	November 9, 2015	978-4-06-376581-6	January 29, 2019	978-1-64-212639-6
11	April 8, 2016	978-4-06-390616-5	March 26, 2019	978-1-64-212702-7
12	November 9, 2016	978-4-06-390661-5	April 23, 2019	978-1-64-212791-1
13	April 7, 2017	978-4-06-390698-1	May 28, 2019	978-1-64-212792-8
14	July 7, 2017	978-4-06-390719-3	June 25, 2019	978-1-64-212830-7
15	November 9, 2017	978-4-06-510339-5	July 23, 2019	978-1-64-212884-0
16	April 9, 2018	978-4-06-511173-4	August 27, 2019	978-1-64-212918-2
17	November 9, 2018	978-4-06-513437-5	September 24, 2019	978-1-64-212954-0
18	April 9, 2019	978-4-06-515051-1	October 22, 2019	978-1-64-659083-4
19	November 8, 2019	978-4-06-517476-0	March 24, 2020	978-1-64-659271-5
20	April 9, 2020	978-4-06-519075-3	September 22, 2020	978-1-64-659711-6
21	November 9, 2020	978-4-06-517476-0	March 30, 2021	978-1-63-699019-4
22	April 8, 2021	978-4-06-522771-8	December 28, 2021	978-1-63-699539-7
23	July 8, 2021	978-4-06-523802-8	March 29, 2022	978-1-63-699670-7
24	January 7, 2022	978-4-06-525738-8	October 18, 2022	978-1-68-491495-1

==== Elegant Yokai Apartment Life: Peru Arc ====
No.	Original release date	Original ISBN	North America release date	North America ISBN
25-1	July 7, 2022	978-4-06-528313-4	February 28, 2023	978-1-68-491717-4
26-2	March 9, 2023	978-4-06-530934-6	July 25, 2023	979-8-88-933051-6
27-3	September 8, 2023	978-4-06-533098-2	February 27, 2024	979-8-88-933382-1
28-4	January 9, 2024	978-4-06-534213-8	August 27, 2024	979-8-88-933698-3
29-5	July 9, 2024	978-4-06-534213-8	January 28, 2025	979-8-89-478321-5
30-6	November 8, 2024	978-4-06-537406-1	June 24, 2025	979-8-89-478557-8
31-7	June 9, 2025	978-4-06-539696-4	—	—
32-8	October 9, 2025	978-4-06-541058-5	—	—
33-9	January 8, 2026	978-4-06-542079-9	—	—

=== Anime ===
The anime adaptation was first announced via the May issue of Kodansha's Monthly Shōnen Sirius on March 18, 2017. Mitsuo Hashimoto directed the anime at Shin-Ei Animation with series composition by Yasunori Yamada. Tomomi Shimazaki designed the characters for animation. The anime aired from July 3 to December 25, 2017, on Tokyo MX, Yomiuri TV, and BS11's Anime no Me programming block. It ran for two cours. Lozareena performed the first opening theme song titled "Good Night Mare" while Atsushi Abe and Yūichi Nakamura performed the ending theme song "Nichijōshiki Broken Down" (日常識Broken down). The second opening theme is performed by Wi-Fi-5, while Lozareena performed the second ending theme, "Neiro". Crunchyroll holds the right for the stream.

No.	Title (Note: All English titles are taken from Crunchyroll.)	Original release date
1	"Yushi and Kotobuki-so"; Transliteration: "Yūshi to Kotobuki-sō" (Japanese: 夕士と寿荘)	July 3, 2017
After losing both parents in a car crash Yushi Inaba has been living with his uncle's family, who almost all seem to resent his presence. After being accepted into the high school of his choice Yushi was finally ready to move out to live in the student dormitory, only for the dormitory to suddenly burn down. With the rebuilding taking 6 months Yushi looks for somewhere else to live during those months and is offered cheap rent at the Kotobuki-sō apartment building. At first all seems normal but as time passes it becomes clear that the building is home to humans and ghosts who all live together. Yushi meets several of his new neighbors, such as Akine Kuga, an exorcist; Reimei Isshiki, Yushi's favourite author; Kuri and Shiro, a ghost boy and dog who are always together; and the apartment chef, Ruriko, a pair of disembodied ghost hands who does all the cooking. After watching Akine exorcise an evil spirit, Yushi must decide if he wants to continue living with ghosts or move back to his uncle's house.
2	"The Residents of the Yokai Apartments"; Transliteration: "Yōkai apāto no jūnin-tachi" (Japanese: 妖怪アパートの住人たち)	July 10, 2017
Yushi decides to stay at Kotobuki-sō and the residents throw him a welcome party. Yushi meets Akira Fukase, a human artist who owns a dog named Cigar, a man named Antiquary, a dealer of magical items, a drunken ghost lady named Mariko who states she has "reasons" for not going to heaven yet, and Ryu, a powerful psychic whom all the ghosts respect. The next day after school Yushi attends club activities with his classmate, Tashiro, and while walking home he appears to experience a psychic flash of Tashiro being injured. Tashiro is immediately hit by a motorbike. When Yushi holds Tashiro's hand all her pain flows into him as a form of spiritual corruption, which is hurriedly exorcised by Akine. Akine explains Yushi has the ability to perform psychic healing by taking a person's suffering into himself and healing their injuries, though the suffering must then be removed from him by an exorcist. The apartment chef, Ruriko, starts making Yushi boxed lunches for school every day.
3	"Kuri and Shiro"; Transliteration: "Kuri to Shiro" (Japanese: クリとシロ)	July 17, 2017
Yushi takes an interest in Kuri and Shiro and meets their adoptive mother, Akane, a spirit beast who guards the nearby Shinto Shrine. She explains that Kuri's real mother was abandoned by her boyfriend when she became pregnant with Kuri and eventually came to hate him. The only love Kuri ever received was from Shiro, a stray dog. Kuri's mother eventually murdered Kuri so Shiro mauled her to death before himself being beaten to death as a mad dog. His mother's madness left a mark on Kuri that prevents him from going to heaven, and her soul keeps trying to attack him, but is kept at bay by the apartment's barrier. That night the mother, whose soul has completely deteriorated into insanity, attempts to penetrate the barrier but is repelled by Akane and disappears. Yushi, who cannot understand why a mother would hate her own son, is overcome by wanting to see his own mother again and breaks down in tears in Akine's room. The next day everything is back to normal but Yushi is embarrassed to learn he cried himself to sleep in Akine's lap and was carried back to his room like a baby by Akira.
4	"This Side"; Transliteration: "Kocchi-gawa" (Japanese: こっち側)	July 24, 2017
A boy from Yushi's class, Takenaka, turns up at Kotobuki-sō, with several delinquents who force their way inside to see the girls living in the apartment, and threaten to burn the place down. Yushi fights with all 6 of them until several other residents come to his defence, including several terrifying Oni. The delinquents are thoroughly beaten up by Akira for making a mess of the garden. At the farewell party to mark the end of Yushi's stay he is given a necklace by Antiquary containing some of Ryu's magical hair, which Akine says a prayer over. After moving into the student dorm with 2 other roommates Yushi finds no one seems willing to make friends with each other and misses his friends from Kotobuki-sō, deciding the student dorm feels too much like living at his uncle's house. He later sees Takenaka and the delinquents being arrested for drug dealing and worries that if he had not turned down Takenaka's offer of friendship earlier in the year, he might not have gotten involved with the delinquents to begin with. He rushes back to Kotobuki-sō but feels so guilty he cannot bring himself to go inside.
5	"A Place to Call Home"; Transliteration: "Tadaima to Ieru Basho" (Japanese: ただいまと言える場所)	July 31, 2017
After several weeks away from Kotobuki-sō, Yushi is finding it harder to believe his ghost friends ever actually existed and throws himself into his schoolwork and a part time job to distract himself, but finds himself still wishing to see them. He bumps into Sato, a Yokai from Kotobuki-sō and is relieved that he didn't just imagine living there. Sato encourages him to keep moving forward, no matter how bad life gets. Yushi gets in touch with his best friend, Hase, who he has not spoken to in months and they reminisce about the past and their plans for the future. Yushi then gets a surprise visit from his cousin, Eri, who was worried he hadn't visited since he moved out of his uncle's house. It turns out Eri had never hated him, she was just uncomfortable living with him due to how he seemed to hate living with them, but the thought of never seeing him again made her sad. The two reconcile with each other and Yushi is motivated to move out of the student dormitory and back into Kotobuki-sō, where everybody welcomes him back, having known he would return when he was ready.
6	"Petit Hirozoikon"; Transliteration: "Puchi Hirozoikon" (Japanese: プチ・ヒエロゾイコン)	August 7, 2017
Yushi meets Furuhonya for the first time, who has spent a year away from Kotobuki-sō collecting rare and valuable spell books. Akine notices one of the books, which contains paintings of Tarot cards, has had a power sealed away inside it and confiscates it from Furuhonya until she decides it is safe. Furuhonya explains that words in spell books can be dangerous due to the different imaginations of the people changing the words meaning as they read them. That night Yushi is visited by the spirit of the book, which calls itself Fool and insists Yushi is his master and can summon all 22 Tarot spirits from the paintings to do his bidding. Yushi summons several spirits but they prove to be so weak they are practically useless. The next day Yushi is at a diner with Hase and they are accosted by delinquents. Hase takes out the leader with one move causing the delinquents to chase them to a building site where they end up trapped inside with the delinquents breaking down the door. Yushi is contacted by Fool who offers help but is accidentally seen by Hase.
7	"I'm in Training!"; Transliteration: "Shugyō-Chūdesu!" (Japanese: 修行中です！)	August 14, 2017
Hase demands to know what Fool is but decides to wait until after the fight. Yushi summons a water spirit and a lightning spirit and manages to electrocute several delinquents while Hase beats up the others. The fight is won when a hippogriff Yushi summoned causes all the delinquents to faint from shock. Hase is surprisingly mature about Yushi being master to an actual magic book and suggests he learn how to use it more effectively. When Akine learns Yushi is now the books master she becomes convinced he has some supernatural potential that has grown since he first came to Kotobuki-sō. She warns him that summoning spirits costs spiritual energy and decides to begin training him to increase his energy so he won't die accidentally, which mostly consists of chanting sutras that put him in magical trances for hours at a time, consuming vast quantities of food, and sleeping. After a week of training Yushi decides it is time to tell Hase the truth. Hase then telephones him and tells him he will visit Kotobuki-sō the next day.
8	"Bookmaster"; Transliteration: "Bukku Masutā" (Japanese: ブックマスター)	August 21, 2017
Despite Yushi's fears, Hase accepts the ghosts and spirits quite easily and even brought most of them thoughtful gifts. Hase is invited to stay the night and Kuri becomes quite attached to him. Severed spirit heads escape from Furuhonya's suitcase but are easily subdued by Furuhonya using a magic book similar to Yushi's. He reveals he is a type of mage known as a Bookmaster, who draws magical power from the spirits of magical books he has made a contract with, which Yushi also has the potential to do. Later, when they are alone, Hase admits he has been terrified all day by the things he has seen but admits it is a good place to live. As they fall asleep Yushi accidentally wakes up Kuri who starts crying. Fool suggests he summon Sirene, a fairy who sings magical songs. With Kuri put to sleep by Sirene's lullaby Fool says he and the other book spirits are proud of how much Yushi has improved in such a short time. Hase departs the next morning promising to visit again.
9	"New Term"; Transliteration: "Shin Gakki" (Japanese: 新学期)	August 28, 2017
Yushi continues training but insists he has no intention of becoming a mage. After returning to school Yushi notices the new English teacher, Miura Katsumasa, seemingly observing a girls PE lesson and feels a surge of inexplicable anger towards him. He decides to stay away from Miura but Fool becomes suspicious of Miura as well. Hase begins spending all his free time at Kotobuki-sō, acting as Kuri's father figure. Ryu returns and decides it is a good thing Yushi's book is a weaker copy of the much more powerful original. Yushi notices a sword scar on Ryu's shoulder and learns most of the adults have scars from their adventures, including bullet wounds, and that even Reimei was once attacked by a fan with a knife. Yushi and Hase decide the adults at Kotobuki-sō are worth looking up to. A giant Cyclops named Matajuro visits Kotobuki-sō from his village hidden in the mountains. Yushi learns such people are often driven away by humans who are afraid of them and thinks the world would be better if humans were more accepting. Fool decides he has something important to tell Yushi. Meanwhile, a dark aura appears around Yushi's school.
10	"School Ghost Stories"; Transliteration: "Gakkō no Kaidan" (Japanese: 学校の怪談)	September 4, 2017
Yushi becomes even more suspicious of Miura when he thinks girls are flirting with Yushi and reacts angrily. Fool, having heard about the schools haunted storage closet suggests Yushi investigate. Yushi summons fortune-telling Norns to learn about the closet but they turn out to be useless. While observing Miura Yushi is attacked by boys from his class who are jealous of Yushi's popularity with the girls so Yushi uses magical thunder to knock them unconscious. Yushi is berated by Fool for using the books magic on meaningless nonsense like dealing with bullies since he had hoped that he would have higher aspirations. While investigating the closet Yushi meets Tashiro, a girl from his class, who is also investigating Miura. Inside the closet they find disturbing graffiti proving that years ago somebody with a powerful hatred of women used the closet to spy on girls during gym class and the negative spiritual energy left inside the closet led to the rumours it was haunted. Yashiro is suddenly grabbed by Miura, who appears to have been possessed by the spiritual energy of the graffiti, causing him to hate all women. He picks up Tashiro and violently throws her across the room.
11	"The Worst Possible Meeting"; Transliteration: "Saiaku no Deai" (Japanese: 最悪の出会い)	September 11, 2017
Yushi catches Tashiro and stops her being injured while Miura runs away. Tashiro decides to learn more about Miura and leaves. Yushi learns from his book spirits that the energy inside the closet is the remnants of powerful emotions left behind by the author of the graffiti that have now manifested as an Id Monster, strong negative emotions that have possessed Miura and increased his already present fear of women. While talking to a female student, Miura has flashbacks to a traumatic event in his past, suffers a panic attack and is taken to hospital. Yushi considers whether an exorcism would help but after listening to the advice of Kotobuki-sō's other residents decides performing an exorcism is too difficult. Yushi receives a call from Tashiro who had learned that Miura's first teaching job was at a prestigious all girls' high school but after an unspecified incident with the girls of the drama club his whole personality changed, his loss of pride and self-confidence making him a perfect vessel for the Id Monster. Yushi and Tashiro go to the hospital to visit Miura, but Miura, once again being controlled by the monster, attacks Tashiro with a knife.
12	"I'm Going to the Future"; Transliteration: "Ore wa mirai ni e iku" (Japanese: 俺は未来にへ行く)	September 18, 2017
Yushi knocks Miura unconscious with a magical explosion then hides Miura to disguise the actions of the Id Monster. Fool congratulates Yushi on his progress since he and the other book spirits are now able to react instinctively to his desires. At Kotobuki-sō Akine suggests the Id Monster has fixated on Tashiro because her outgoing personality is the exact opposite of Miura's misery and it became jealous. Yushi goes to the hospital and witnesses Miura attack Tashiro again, only as the Id monster awakens it is absorbed by a paper doll that had been pretending to be Tashiro and is sealed away by Akine. Despite being cured Miura continues to rant about how much he hates women. Realising that Miura will always be a misogynist Akine and Yushi walk away. The next day Yushi is lured away by Miura who attempts to murder him, forcing Yushi to use his explosion spell again, injuring himself and damaging the school. Yushi is unhappy with how the situation ended but is cheered up by the residents of Kotobuki-sō and Hase, who insists he train harder. A month later life has returned to normal with Yushi fleeing from delinquents and looking forward to summer.
13	"Metamorphosis"; Transliteration: "Metamorufōze" (Japanese: メタモルフォーゼ)	September 25, 2017
Akine starts Yushi on more difficult training that leaves him unable to walk, requiring Akira to carry him to the bath to recover. This continues for a week until he gets used to the training, only to find he has lost weight and has to resist the violent urges he once felt while living at his uncle's house. Akine insists he get some rest while Reimei assures him the changes to his body and mind are part of his training. Yushi feels better when he learns everyone at Kotobuki-sō acted the same while learning magic. Yushi rededicates himself to training and succeeds in astral projecting his spirit to experience Divine Inspiration, the act of overcoming mental limitations and improving one step further. Akine explains his weight loss and mental instability was the result of the training preparing him to handle higher level magic. As a reward for completing the training Ryu activates Yushi's third eye, which will allow him to access supernatural intuition in times of need. Fool reveals that the increase in Yushi's power has also increased the power of Fool and the other book spirits, though Yushi finds Fool's account of their improvement to be rather over exaggerated.
14	"Late Night at the Yokai Apartments"; Transliteration: "Yōkai Apāto no yoru wa fuke te" (Japanese: 妖怪アパートの夜はふけて)	October 2, 2017
Summer vacation: Yushi considers putting off paying his rent, but the landlord's lecture convinces him otherwise. Hase returns from a luxury trip to Australia, as usual with gifts for everyone. Antiquary also arrives, and negotiates the sale of a unicorn horn to Hase. Akine decides that she needs a waterfall for Yushi to train under, instead of a hose; and it turns out that the landlord can create that, next to the baths in the basement. Yushi visits his parents' graves, and finds out that they'll have a new teacher when term begins again.
15	"A New Teacher Arrives"; Transliteration: "Shinnin kyōshi tōjō" (Japanese: 新任教師登場)	October 9, 2017
The two new teachers -- a man named Chiaki and a woman named Aoki -- are both young and attractive. Chiaki in particular is 'hip', acting casual and friendly with students. There's also a transfer student in the English Club, a overly serious girl named Yamamoto who is into foreign films and literature. Yamamoto is disdainful and insulting to the others. Yushi discusses her with his neighbors; but after an argument in club, Yamamoto stops attending.
16	"Look at the Full moon and Jump"; Transliteration: "Jūgoya o tsuki sama mi te haneru" (Japanese: 十五夜お月様見て跳ねる)	October 16, 2017
When training and astral projecting, Yushi begins to see new visions. Reimei and Akine chat with Yushi about the meanings of the full moon, as the apartment dwellers prepare for a moon-viewing party. (As in so many episodes, there's a lot of detail about and praise for Japanese dishes!) Akine talks about the hospital where she works; yokai patients from the hospital at join the apartment neighbors for the moon viewing, and several of the ghosts pass on from the party.
17	"The Road to Hell Is Paved With Good Intentions"; Transliteration: "Jigoku e no michi wa zeni de hosō sare te iru" (Japanese: 地獄への道は善意で舗装されている)	October 23, 2017
Aoki is rather uptight: reading a bible verse in class, correcting Chiaki for being too familiar with students, and patronizing Yushi in several ways because he is "suffering" the loss of his parents. The English Conversation club president scolds Yamamoto for not helping the group plan for the Foreigners' Club social, and when she runs out crying, Aoki scolds the club members for "bullying". Chiaki reassures Aoki -- and Yushi -- that there's plenty of evidence Yushi is doing fine.
18	"Words From the Bottom of your Body"; Transliteration: "Shintai no soko kara deru kotoba" (Japanese: 身体の底から出る言葉)	October 30, 2017
Yushi spends a three-day weekend at his job with Kenzaki Movers, where he is put in charge of two new part-timers: college men named Sasaki and Kawashima. (Fool wants Yushi to rely on the Petits for his work, but Yushi realizes that would be a disaster.) The new guys are quiet and standoffish, and Yushi has to figure out how to direct and communicate with them. The new guys handle one package incorrectly and Yushi and his boss have to take responsibility; but in the end both the college guys and Yushi have learned from the job.
19	"Let's Communication"; Transliteration: "Rettsu komyunikēshon" (Japanese: レッツ・コミュニケーション)	November 6, 2017
Yushi senses something, similar to his premonition about Tashiro's accident, and sees a girl who is about to jump off a roof. She talks about why she wants to die, but before she jumps, Fool appears before her. In her surprise and fright, she jumps back to Yushi. She's a sixth grader named Yumi Asada; she tracks down Yushi to thank him, talking more about the problems she has been having. Over the next few days, Yumi intercepts Yushi several times around town, until he finally agrees to let her come along with him to the Foreigners' Club social. (But first he tells her to ditch her makeup and too-adult clothing style.) At the party, Yushi gets drafted to help 'dub' an anime for the English speakers. On the way home, they meet the delinquents that Yumi had been hanging out with. Yumi tells them off, and when they threaten her, Yushi uses the Petit power to stun them. Yumi straightens herself out, deciding because of meeting the people at the party that she'd like to learn English.
20	"Under the Gilt"; Transliteration: "Metsuki no Nakami" (Japanese: メツキの中身)	November 13, 2017
As the culture festival approaches, Toshiro gives Yushi a lot of background on Yamamoto; she was a good student at her previous school but grew more and more angry and contentious as she tried to match her older sister's achievements. We see Yamamoto around town, grumbling and growling at everyone for not appreciating her. Yushi tries to talk with Yamamoto in the library, but she sarcastically sends him away. Meanwhile, Yushi realizes that Chiaki's relaxed attitude is a way of showing students that he trusts them; discipline has improved because Chiaki has befriended so many students.
21	"It Isn't a Manga!"; Transliteration: "Manga ja nai!" (Japanese: 漫画じゃない！)	November 20, 2017
Yushi is studying hard for midterms. Antiquary shows the group an "omnidimensional 3D projector", and they find themselves flying over a strange landscape with huge creatures. They're attacked by a man who calls Antiquary "a Heretic of the Far Reaches". He and Antiquary battle magically; Antiquary tells Yushi "farewell" and removes his eyepatch, at which point everyone finds themselves back at the apartments, with Antiquary and the projector missing. Furuhonya tells them the attacker was a "miracle hunter" from the "Secret Church", an agency that tries to hide the existence of magic. Later, Furuhonya drags Yushi away from his studies to show the group a bottle of "the elixir of immortality" that he brought back from a trek. Dr. Fujiyuki from the yokai hospital analyzes the bottle and says the elixir is real, but the bottle is empty. When it's opened, the bottle is found to have one drop left; several of the group touch it and lick their fingers, and Fujiyuki says they have probably extended their lifespan by about seven months.
22	"Burning Student Assembly!"; Transliteration: "Moeru seito sōkai!" (Japanese: 燃える生徒総会！)	November 27, 2017
Yushi and others are stressing through midterms. (It turns out that Hase has perfect recall, so tests are no stress for him.) Chiaki catches a student cheating with his cell-phone and gets really angry. Chiaki calls all the students to an assembly and announces that the old ban on phones will now be enforced; he stomps on the offenders phone and says the same will be done with any phone found on school grounds. (The apartment neighbors are watching the assembly by means of an odd kind of TV-spirit.) Aoki steps up and says he has gone too far, and most of the students shout and chant against Chiaki. Yushi uses Fool to knock over the microphone, so that everyone is interrupted. This gives the student president the chance to call for order. She negotiates with Chiaki to allow students to have phones, but if misused they'll be confiscated instead of destroyed. Both Hase and Fool speculate that Chiaki overreacted in order to get the students to support the lesser punishment.
23	"Do You Like Other Faces? Or Not?"; Transliteration: "Betsu no Kao, Suki? Kirai?" (Japanese: 別の顔、好き？嫌い？)	December 4, 2017
The apartment dwellers are excited about the culture fair; will they attend?? Students are still grumbling the cell phone rules and about Chiaki, who has been missing classes. For the fair, Yushi's class is running an oni-hunting game; English Conversation Club is writing a play; Yamamoto's class is holding a cafe. In both club and class, Yamamoto doesn't participate, glowering and grumbling. Antiquary returns, but won't explain what happened to him; he has seifu and other school uniforms for all the yokai. Yushi chats with Chiaki, and notices a black aura on his chest; he tries to remove the damage as he did with Tashiro. Chiaki tells him he has anemia, but he does feel slightly better. On the way home, Yushi passes out because he unknowingly took the damage onto himself. Akine makes sure he's OK.
24	"The Storm Before the Storm"; Transliteration: "Arashi no Mae no Arashi" (Japanese: 嵐の前の嵐)	December 11, 2017
Ruriko is making much festival food like takoyaki, cotton candy, and caramel apples. Meanwhile Yamamoto's family are encouraging her sister but telling Yamamoto not to over exert herself. In the club, Yamamoto insults everyone, calling their play preschool-ish. She drops her resignation letter at the president's feet and goes into an angry rant. Yushi sees her extremely negative aura. Aoki steps in to apologize to Yamamoto on behalf of "everyone"; the other students refuse, and Aoki leads Yamamoto out. Yamamoto joins the flock of girls who look up to and hang around Aoki. The yokai are in festival mode; they even have goldfish scooping in the dining hall. At the school the night before the festival, Yushi senses evil intent similar to the suicide; he finds Chiaki has been slashed. He stops the girl who did it, who admits it was because she was offended that Chiaki doesn't go along with Aoki. Chiaki is unconscious, and Yushi sends the petit Jin to retrieve the elixir bottle from his room. The last drop heals Chiaki's wound and revives him.
25	"A Great Storm Blows"; Transliteration: "Ōarashi fukiarete" (Japanese: 大嵐吹き荒れて)	December 18, 2017
The culture fair is going well. The president and Tashiro have a secret plan for the festival finale. The apartment dwellers have come; Yushi introduces some human neighbors to his friends. But the ghosts are here too: the landlord gets his picture taken because people think it's a costume; Ruriko sneaks into a food booth to help; other yokai enjoy snacks while hiding in the bushes. Akira, Reimei, and Mariko all make a splash, and Akine wins the eating contest. Some tough-guy students sabotage the power to interrupt the final assembly, but Yushi organizes the yokai and the petits to get light and sound going again. Chiaki thrills the crowd by singing rock songs.
26	"Elegant Yokai Apartment Life"; Transliteration: "Yōkai Apāto no Yūga na Nichijō" (Japanese: 妖怪アパートの幽雅な日常)	December 25, 2017
Christmas is a busy time for Yushi's workplace. While delivering, he meets Yumi and George, dressed as Santas and on their way to a party; his delinquent former friend Takenaka, working; and his cousin Eri. Of course the apartment residents party on New Year's Eve. Next to the waterfall, the landlord opens a portal to a snowy field filled with huts, where Yushi and Hase can visit various scenes from various pasts and futures. One hut sucks them into a dimensional rift; Yushi saves them by using the petits.
