= Fool Night =

Japanese manga series

- First tankōbon volume cover

フールナイト (Fūru Naito)
- Genre: Dystopian; Post-apocalyptic; Science fiction thriller
- Manga
- Written by: Kasumi Yasuda
- Published by: Shogakukan
- English publisher: NA: Viz Media; SEA: Shogakukan Asia
- Imprint: Big Superior Comics
- Magazine: Big Comic Superior
- Original run: November 13, 2020 – present
- Volumes: 13
- Original net animation
- Directed by: Atsushi Yukawa; Ryou Shimura (Note: Assistant Director (副監督). See the Shaft director credits legend.)
- Written by: Jin Tanaka
- Music by: Tatsuya Kato
- Studio: Sunrise; Shaft
- Licensed by: Netflix
- Released: November 26, 2026 (scheduled)
- icon

Fool Night (Japanese: フールナイト, Hepburn: Fūru Naito) is a Japanese manga series written and illustrated by Kasumi Yasuda. It has been serialized in Shogakukan's seinen manga magazine Big Comic Superior since November 2020. An original net animation (ONA) adaptation produced by Sunrise and Shaft is set to premiere worldwide on Netflix in November 2026.

== Plot ==
For 100 years, a thick layer of clouds have enveloped the planet and no sunlight reaches Earth's surface. As a result, plants have withered and there is a rapidly-decreasing amount of oxygen in the atmosphere. To breathe, humanity has developed a technology of transfloration, which allows humans to be transformed into plants. Initially, only terminally ill people were selected, but the promised high reward has also attracted other volunteers. They receive all the necessary funds for the two years the transformation lasts. Thus, everyone is faced with the choice of continuing to live as a human in the desolate world or beginning a new life as a plant.

The young Toshiro Kamiya is among those who see no future in his human life. He had wanted to become a musician, but his grades in school are not good enough, and he has to pay for his sick mother's medication. He works hard and tries to save up for his education, but when his mother tries to take his savings, he loses all hope. He asks his friend Yomiko Horai to turn him into a plant so he can live happily for at least two years. During this process, he unexpectedly gains the ability to understand the language of plants. Since his mother has once again taken all his money, he uses this ability to find a new job: searching for plants on behalf of their relatives and communicating with them.

== Characters ==
Toshiro Kamiya (神谷 十四郎, Kamiya Tōshirō)
Voiced by: Koki Uchiyama
A young man living in poverty. He decides to apply for a transfloration. Since his operation, he has been able to understand the language of plants.
Yomiko Horai (蓬莱 ヨミコ, Hōrai Yomiko)
Voiced by: Minako Kotobuki
An employee of the Transflora Medical Facility and a childhood friend of Toshiro's. She loves eating more than anything.
Akira Yatsuka (八束 アキラ, Yatsuka Akira)
Voiced by: Junya Enoki
Deputy Director of Human Resources at Transflora Medical Facility No. 4. He despises Toshiro.
Saeko Kanaeno (叶野 沙絵子, Kanaeno Saeko)
Voiced by: Aya Endō
A former soldier who was responsible for border surveillance. She now works as Akira's personal bodyguard.
Jin Hiragishi (平岸 ジン, Hiragishi Jin)
Voiced by: Kiyomitsu Mizuuchi
Chief of the Special Assistance Division otherwise known as the Unsection at Transflora Medical Facility No. 4. He is the superior of Yomiko.
Ivy (アイヴィー, Aivii)
Voiced by: Yumiko Kobayashi
A spiriflor that remains mobile despite its transfloration. It is responsible for about twenty murders.
Yo Kunibe (国部 楊, Kunibe Yō)
Director of communications for Transflora Medical's Spiriflora Research Group. He is responsible for liaising with the police.
Mine Yatsuka (八束 ミネ, Yatsuka Mine)
A police inspector involved in the investigation on Ivy. She is also Akira Yatsuka's aunt.
Shinichi Tasaki (田崎 慎一, Tasaki Shinichi)
A police lieutenant. He is also involved in the investigation on Ivy.
Ken Hikasa (日笠 健, Hikasa Ken)
Voiced by: Hiroshi Tsuchida
Head of the Glory Days party who demands an end to transfloration. He is a cold-hearted man who will do anything to advance his agenda.
Nishi (西)
Voiced by: Nobuhiko Okamoto
A member of the Glory Days party. He harbors a deep hatred for the transfloration system. He seems to have some past connection to Akira.
Ōtarō Kūdai (九大 旺太郎, Kūdai Ōtarō)
A brilliant scientist who created the transfloraison technique. He stops at nothing to satisfy his curiosity.
Ai Yukima (雪間 アイ, Yukima Ai)
A member of Human Resources at Transflora Medical Facility No. 4. Akira's subordinate. She is an ambitious woman who is very focused on her career.
Hisaomi Kaburagi (鏑木 久臣, Kaburagi Hisaomi)
Director of Human Resources at Transflora Medical Facility No. 4. Akira's superior. He is good at detecting lies.
Sumi Matsuno (松野スミ, Matsuno Sumi)
Voiced by: Shion Wakayama
Meg Okumura (メグ オクムラ, Megu Okamura)
Voiced by: Sayaka Senbongi

== Media ==
=== Manga ===
Written and illustrated by Kasumi Yasuda, Fool Night started in Shogakukan's seinen manga magazine Big Comic Superior on November 13, 2020. Shogakukan has collected its chapters into individual tankōbon volumes. The first volume was released on March 30, 2021. As of June 30, 2026, thirteen volumes have been released.

In North America, the manga has been licensed for English release by Viz Media. It has been licensed in Southeast Asia by Shogakukan Asia.

==== Volumes ====
No.	Original release date	Original ISBN	English release date	English ISBN
1	March 30, 2021	978-4-09-860866-9	June 18, 2024	978-1-9747-4693-4
2	August 30, 2021	978-4-09-861132-4	September 17, 2024	978-1-9747-4877-8
3	January 28, 2022	978-4-09-861239-0	December 17, 2024	978-1-9747-4944-7
4	June 30, 2022	978-4-09-861319-9	March 18, 2025	978-1-9747-5212-6
5	November 30, 2022	978-4-09-861473-8	June 17, 2025	978-1-9747-5505-9
6	April 28, 2023	978-4-09-861696-1	September 16, 2025	978-1-9747-5796-1
7	September 28, 2023	978-4-09-862527-7	December 16, 2025	978-1-9747-5797-8
8	March 29, 2024	978-4-09-862693-9	March 17, 2026	978-1-9747-6235-4
9	September 30, 2024	978-4-09-863036-3	June 16, 2026	978-1-9747-6365-8
10	February 28, 2025	978-4-09-863205-3	September 15, 2026	978-1-9747-6530-0
11	July 30, 2025	978-4-09-863521-4	December 15, 2026	978-1-9747-6591-1
12	January 30, 2026	978-4-09-863763-8	—	—
13	June 30, 2026	978-4-09-864015-7	—	—

=== Anime ===
In June 2026, during Netflix's Anime Studio Focus panel at the 2026 Annecy International Animation Film Festival event, it was announced that the manga would receive an original net animation (ONA) adaptation. The series will be produced by Sunrise and Shaft and directed by Atsushi Yukawa, with series composition by Jin Tanaka, character designs by Robert Sato, and music composed by Tatsuya Kato. It is set to premiere worldwide on Netflix on November 26, 2026. The opening theme song is "Shake! Spit Out", performed by Tempalay, and the ending theme song is "Iki" (粋; lit. 'Breath'), performed by Nowlu.

== Reception ==
By November 2026, the manga had over one million copies in circulation. The series was nominated for the 2022 Next Manga Award in the print manga category. Alongside Kujima: Why Sing, When You Can Warble? and Nippon Sangoku, Fool Night ranked twelfth in the 2023 edition of Takarajimasha's Kono Manga ga Sugoi! list of best manga for male readers. It was picked as a nominee for "Best Comic" at the 50th Angoulême International Comics Festival held in 2023.
