= List of Slayers episodes =

The following is an episode list of the animated television series Slayers, adapted from the light novel series of the same title by Hajime Kanzaka and Rui Araizumi. As of 2024, there have been five seasons with a total of 104 episodes originally aired on TV Tokyo between 1995 and 2009. The article's English air dates follow the Sunday broadcast due to sporadic schedule changes from the International Channel.

== Episodes ==
=== Season 1 (1995) ===
- Opening theme: Get Along by Megumi Hayashibara and Masami Okui.
- Ending theme: Kujikenaikara ! (Because I'll Never Give Up!) by Megumi Hayashibara and Masami Okui.

No. overall	No. in season	Title	Directed by	Written by	Original release date	English air date
1	1	"ANGRY? Lina's Furious Dragon Slave!"; Transliteration: "Angry? Rina Ikari no Doragu Sureibu" (Japanese: Angry? リナ怒りのドラグスレイブ)	Takashi Watanabe	Takao Koyama	April 7, 1995	February 17, 2002
A 15-year-old sorceress named Lina Inverse raids a group of bandits. On her way to Atlas City, she is surrounded by more bandits. Just as Lina prepares to attack, a mercenary swordsman, Gourry Gabriev, appears and defeats the bandits. Lina and Gourry befriend each other. Soon after, Lina and Gourry are asked to exterminate the dragon threatening a small village. Having no reason to refuse, Lina takes on the job despite Gourry's dissuasion. Being intimidated by the dragon, Lina is outraged. Lina uses the Dragu Slave technique on the dragon, killing it and destroying most of the village. Lina and Gourry eventually run away from the villagers after the village's destruction.
2	2	"BAD! Mummy Men Aren't My Type!"; Transliteration: "Bad! Miira Otoko wa Shumi ja nai!" (Japanese: Bad! ミイラ男は趣味じゃない!)	Makoto Sokuza	Takao Koyama	April 14, 1995	February 24, 2002
Lina and Gourry go to a magic shop in town to sell the treasures that Lina snatched from the bandits. However an item from the booty, a knife, is cursed and it turns the shopkeeper violent and a hullabaloo starts. Lina and Gourry fight a hard battle but the chaos is brought to a sudden stop by a single bark of the shopkeeper's wife. While they are relieved, a mummy called Zolf, attacks our heroes with the evil trolls. He is looking for one of the items Lina possesses. Lina and Gourry are fighting their way out. However, on the same evening, Zolf shows up to their room again with a mysterious person.
3	3	"CRASH! Red and White and Suspicious All Over!"; Transliteration: "Crash! Gekitotsu! Akai no Shiroi no Ayashii no!" (Japanese: Crash! 激突!赤いの白いの怪しいの!)	Kazu Yokota	Katsuhiko Chiba	April 21, 1995	March 3, 2002
The mysterious person says that his name is Zelgadis Greywords. He is a mixture of human, golem and demon; a creation of utter evil. He offers to buy Lina's booty, but Lina asks for an outrageous price which drives him away. Not giving up, Zelgadis comes back to take Lina's booty by force. Lina is hurt and thrown into a pinch. Luckily she is saved by the legendary great sage, Rezo the Red Priest. Rezo warns Lina that Zelgadis wants to resurrect the mazoku Shabranigdo, the demon king, then Rezo mysteriously disappears after performing some unknown spell...
4	4	"DASH! Run for it! My Magic Doesn't Work?"; Transliteration: "Dash! Nigero! Mahō ga Tsukaenai?" (Japanese: Dash! 逃げろ!魔法が使えない?)	Masato Sato	Jiro Takayama	April 28, 1995	March 10, 2002
Lina and Gourry start investigating a way to stop Shabranigdo's resurrection, however they are plagued with a question. Why is Zelgadis trying to revive the Demon Lord? On the other hand, Rezo cannot easily be trusted. The situation becomes more complicated when Zelgadis and Zolf realize that they are no longer able to scry for the as yet unknown item that is in Lina's possession. While our heroes are traveling through a forest, Lina informs Gourry that she will not be able use her sorcery effectively for a few days. This makes her vulnerable to any villains that may challenge her. As fate would have it, Zelgadis and his men come to attack. During the exchange, one of Zelgadis's men, Dilgear the Werewolf/Troll, lets slip that it is, in fact, the Orihalcon statue that has them chasing Lina across the countryside. Lina narrowly escapes the initial attack and is separated from Gourry. However, she is quickly ambushed, knocked unconscious with a spell, and captured by Zelgadis.
5	5	"ESCAPE! Noonsa, the Flaming Fish Man!"; Transliteration: "Escape! Honō no Hangyojin Nunsa!" (Japanese: Escape! 炎の半魚人ヌンサ!)	Johei Matsuura	Katsumi Hasegawa	May 5, 1995	March 17, 2002
Lina awakens to find that she is held captive in Zelgadis' hideout. After Lina is questioned about the Orihalcon statue, she lies about why Zolf is unable to locate it magically. She is then asked why she didn't fight back harder in the previous skirmish. Zelgadis determines that she should be kept alive until they retrieve the statue in any case and she is then subjected to threats of torture by Zolf and repercussions for her previous treatment of him, much of it ineffective, to his dismay. She is then introduced to Noonsa, a monster half-fish and half-human, who threatens Lina with a big, fishy kiss. Zolf then gags her and proceeds to insult her incessantly. Meanwhile, back at the village, Gourry is searching for Lina, unsuccessfully. He retreats to a tavern where, after some thorough reasoning, he comes to the conclusion that she must have been captured during their fight earlier with Zelgadis and co. Later, while Zelgadis is asleep, he dreams of himself as a human and being magically assaulted by Rezo, changing him into his present form. He awakens suddenly, out of breath and cursing Rezo's name. Down in the dungeon, everyone is asleep as well, including our captive and hanging Lina. She is awakened suddenly, with her bonds now severed. To her surprise, the one who helped her escape is Zelgadis himself. He runs away with Lina from his men but never reveals his reason for doing so. Then, Noonsa appears and drags Lina into a lake. Lina still hasn't regained her magical power and fights a tough battle with Noonsa in the water. Finally, Zelgadis finds Lina behind a rock in the lake, turns Noonsa into a grilled fish with a 'Fire Ball' spell, and gets Lina out of danger. Lina, being a carefree soul, begins to form somewhat of a bond with Zelgadis, accepting him as her 'pro-se' bodyguard until this situation is resolved. Just then, Rezo appears...
6	6	"FOCUS! Rezo's the Real Enemy?!"; Transliteration: "Focus! Hontō no Teki wa Rezo?" (Japanese: Focus! 本当の敵はレゾ?)	Susumu Ishizaki	Yasunori Yamada	May 12, 1995	March 24, 2002
Rezo suddenly appears during Lina's escape of and calls Zelgadis a traitor. Lina is surprised to discover the relationship between the two. Zelgadis' grudge against Rezo makes him revolt against him. Lina and Zelgadis barely make it out virtually unharmed, with Zelgadis using Lina as a distraction against Rezo, with quite a bit of protest from Lina. Rezo's men discover the escape, as well as the cooked Noonsa, and subsequently eat him, all while swearing vengeance for his death. Soon after escaping Rezo, Lina and Zelgadis take a break to rest and Lina, being quite confused after find out about Rezo and Zelgadis's relationship, asks Zelgadis to explain to her just what, exactly, is going on. He explains that Rezo is, truly, the famous "Rezo the Red Priest" and that he wasn't always the man that he is now. He goes on to say that he knows nothing about trying to resurrect the "Dark Lord Shabranigdo" and that what Rezo is actually looking for is "The Philosopher's Stone", a legendary stone that amplifies magic, and that it is hidden inside the Orihalcon statue. He also explains that Rezo was born blind and has been searching for a cure using magic of any sort. He wants the stone for this purpose and that this long, fruitless quest is what has turned his heart dark. Zelgadis wants the stone for himself in order to kill Rezo for turning him into the chimera that he is. He explains that Rezo is also his ancestor and that he imagines that Rezo is at least 3 generations previous to him. Elsewhere, Gourry is still searching in the forest for Lina. He then looks down at his hand in which he is holding the statue. Later, he is seen fishing and still wondering of her whereabouts. Regretting having asked for an explanation, Lina settles down for some sleep. Just then, a disturbance in the forest alerts the pair to the presence of Dilgear and Rezo's other troll henchmen having tracked them down and surrounded them. Zelgadis defeats most of the trolls with a single spell and has a sword fight with Dilgear, easily winning due to the revelation that his one-third golem aspect prevents him being injured by any sword other than the 'Sword of Light'. Dilgear retreats, vowing to report him to Rezo. Having no other place to go, Zelgadis is invited to join Lina on her journey to Atlas City as the two set off for the road.
7	7	"GIVE UP! But, Just Before We Do, the Sure Kill Sword Appears!"; Transliteration: "Give Up Sunzen? Deta Hissatsu no Ken!!" (Japanese: Give Up寸前? 出た必殺の剣っ!!)	Yoshiaki Iwasaki	Jukki Hanada	May 19, 1995	March 31, 2002
Under the villains' ceaseless attack, Lina and Zelgadis have no time to rest. Meanwhile, Rezo begins to summon the demons in order to capture them. Outnumbered by the enemies, Lina and Zelgadis get into a pinch. Suddenly a shining knight pops up. It's Gourry who has been looking for Lina. He draws his ancestral sword, the Sword of Light, and slashes the fiends. Zolf and Rodimus, two loyal followers of Zelgadis, come to help them, our heroes shake off Rezo and his band.
8	8	"HELP! Shabranigdo is Reborn!"; Transliteration: "Help! Shaburanigudu Fukkatsu!!" (Japanese: Help! シャブラニグドゥ復活!!)	Kazu Yokota	Jiro Takayama	May 26, 1995	April 7, 2002
While taking a rest in a village, Gourry and Zelgadis start fighting over the Philosopher's Stone. Lina calms them down but they become more hostile with each other. Then, they receive a message from Rezo, stating that unless they give the Philosopher's Stone to him, he will turn all the villagers into stones. Having no choice, Lina and the others go to meet Rezo. Lina has no intention of giving the Stone to Rezo because she knows that the Red Priest is scheming to resurrect Shabranigdo. Rezo manages to hypnotize Zelgadis and makes him steal the Stone. With the Stone in his possession Rezo revives the Dark Lord Shabranigdo.
9	9	"IMPACT! The Eve of the Great Life or Death Struggle!"; Transliteration: "Impact! Kyōi no Kessen Zen'ya!" (Japanese: Impact! 脅威の決戦前夜!)	Eiichi Sato	Seiko Watanabe	June 2, 1995	April 14, 2002
Rezo succeeds in resurrecting the Dark Lord, Shabranigdo. However, Rezo's body is taken over by the Dark Lord which was not part of his plan. Zolf and Rodimas recklessly challenge Shabranigdo, but are no match to the power of the Dark Lord. All Lina and others can do is to run from the ferocious demon. Shabranigdo's evil power spreads out to the surrounding areas. The weather turns abnormal and monsters become wild. Seeing the monsters attack the village, Lina and others decide to fight back.
10	10	"JACKPOT! The Great Life or Death Gamble!"; Transliteration: "Jackpot! Noru ka Soru ka no Ō-Bakuchi!" (Japanese: Jackpot! のるかそるかの大バクチ!)	Makoto Sokuza	Jiro Takayama	June 9, 1995	April 21, 2002
Lina and the others challenge the Dark Lord, Shabranigdo. Unfortunately, he is too powerful and no magic works against him. Gourry is knocked down and Zelgadis is struck hard. Then, Lina is given the Sword of Light and it increases the power of her sorcery. Lina challenges Shabranigdo with the most powerful incantation, Giga Slave, which is superior to the Dragu Slave. She realizes that Rezo is still inside Shabranigdo. In the final moment, Rezo gets away from the body of Shabranigdo and finally Lina's Giga Slave smashes the Dark Lord. Upon arriving in Atlas City, Zelgadis decides to part ways with Lina and Gourry.
11	11	"KNOCK OUT! The Saillune Family Feud!"; Transliteration: "Knock Out! Seirūn Oie Sōdō!" (Japanese: Knock out! セイルーンお家騒動!)	Johei Matsuura	Katsuhiko Chiba	June 16, 1995	April 28, 2002
After destroying Shabranigdo, Lina and Gourry continue their journey. They hear a rumor about the first successor to the throne, the prince of Seyruun Kingdom. Lina dreams of marrying a wealthy young man, but the prince turns out to be a forty-something scruffy-looking man. Phil, the prince, offers a bodyguard job to a disappointed Lina. Lina reluctantly accepts the offer. Then Randy, who is the third successor to the throne, appears with his loyal subordinate, Brassdamon. Randy has a plot to kill Prince Philionel. Lina meets Amelia, Phil's daughter, who is a self-proclaimed Lady of Justice. Amelia punishes Randy for treason by slashing Randy with the help of her father. Lina can't help but to wonder why they hired Lina as a bodyguard in the first place.
12	12	"LOVELY! Amelia's Magic Training!"; Transliteration: "Lovely! Ameria no Mahō Shugyō" (Japanese: Lovely! アメリアの魔法修行)	Takashi Kobayashi	Katsumi Hasegawa	June 23, 1995	May 5, 2002
Lina's Dragu Slave spell works tremendously well on bandits. Impressed, Amelia insists on learning Lina's sorcery. However, Lina is concerned by Amelia's reckless ways and orders hard training for Amelia, instead. However, the training has little to do with actual sorcery. Impressed by Amelia's enthusiasm, Phil asks Lina to show his daughter the Dragu Slave. Lina's incantation breaks the seal of ghosts and throws the Kingdom into a chaos. Lina is not well versed in white magic and fights a tough battle with the ghosts. Just when they think the Kingdom is going to be destroyed, Amelia saves it with her white magic. Amelia finally understands that she doesn't have to practice a powerful incantation.
13	13	"MONEY! Crush Those Bounty Hunters!"; Transliteration: "Money! Shōkin Kasegi o Buchinomese!!" (Japanese: Money! 賞金稼ぎをブチのめせっ!!)	Masato Sato	Jiro Takayama	June 30, 1995	May 12, 2002
Lina, Gourry and Amelia finally arrive in Seyruun and see the wanted poster. To their surprise Lina and Gourry find themselves on the wanted poster. Amelia, the Lady of Justice captures them, stating that she just carries out her holy mission. Lina and Gourry are handed over to two bounty hunters, Zangulus and Vrumugun. After sealing Lina's magic and taking away Gourry's swords they are both placed in jail. But Lina and Gourry somehow manage to escape. Outraged Lina and Gourry challenge the bounty hunters. They are cornered by strong counter-attack of Zangulus and Vrumagun. Amelia, dismayed in judging who is good and who is not, manipulates a strong incantation, saying "whoever stays alive is good!" and blows up the entire area. Lina and Gourry barely survive it, and continue their journey to Sairaag where they are told the person responsible for the wanted poster can be found.
14	14	"NAVIGATION! An Invitation To Sairaag!"; Transliteration: "Navigation! Sairāgu e no Shōtaijō!" (Japanese: Navigation! サイラーグへの招待状!)	Yoshiaki Iwasaki	Katsumi Hasegawa	July 7, 1995	May 19, 2002
Lina and her friends are still pursued by the bounty hunters. They try to lose them in the mountains to no avail. Our heroes have no time for a meal and their empty stomachs is taking a toll on them. They follow their noses into a cave where the smell of delicious food emanates. But it is a trap setup by Zangulus and Vrumugan... They narrowly escape from the cave and escape on a raft in a rapid stream. Zangulus and Vrumugan try to catch on, but finally Lina's magic knocks them out and the pursuers are thrown into the water.
15	15	"OH NO! Lina's Wedding Rhapsody?"; Transliteration: "Oh no! Rina no Kekkon Kyōsōkyoku?" (Japanese: Oh no! リナの結婚狂想曲?)	Johei Matsuura	Jukki Hanada	July 14, 1995	May 26, 2002
On their way to Sairaag, Lina and her friends meet a young boy named Harris. He asks Lina to be his bride in a fake marriage because he's been forced by a witch, named Callie, to marry her daughter. Lina reluctantly accepts his request and attends a fake wedding ceremony with Harris, but then Zangulus and Vrumugan jump in. The ceremony is in a chaos and Lina has to fight in her wedding dress. While Callie and Vrumugan fight against each other, Lina recites an incantation and wins the battle. By accident Lina blows up Harris' house in the battle and as a result doesn't receive her fee from Harris.
16	16	"PASSION! Shall We Give Our Lives for the Stage?"; Transliteration: "Passion! Butai ni Kakeru Seishun?" (Japanese: Passion! 舞台にかける青春?)	Makoto Sokuza	Yasunori Yamada	July 21, 1995	June 2, 2002
In exchange for food and transportation, Lina's team joins a traveling theater company managed by an eccentric director and is heading near Sairaag for a competition. Ironically, the play they perform is "The Death of the Abominable Fiend Lina Inverse" and revolves the hero defeating a fictional, evil Lina Inverse. Amelia is cast as the protagonist and falls in love with the role's frequent proclamations of justice. During the competition, Zangulus and Vrumugun launch an attack on the play, which the audience mistakenly believes is part of the show. After Lina and friends defeat the enemy, the audience and judges award the team 1st place, praising the unpredictable plot, marvelous special effects, realistic combat.
17	17	"QUESTION? He's Proposing to THAT Girl?"; Transliteration: "Question? Ano Ko? ni Puropōzu!" (Japanese: Question? あの娘?にプロポーズ!)	Kazu Yokota	Seiko Watanabe	July 28, 1995	June 9, 2002
Lina, Gourry, and Amelia are getting closer to Sairaag. In order to outrun the tenacious pursuers they try to board a ship, however the ship is also watched by the bounty hunters. Gourry dresses up in women's clothing and our heroes boards the ship as sisters. On the ship, Volun, a self-professed "Braveheart", proposes to Gourry. Gourry freaks out while Lina and Amelia laugh hysterically. All of a sudden a dragon roaming the area attacks the ship which is then forced to return to the harbor. Lina fights a fierce battle with the dragon and finally defeats it, leaving the legend of "the Celestial Maiden who saves folks" behind. The next day when Lina and her friends board the ship, Volun shows up yet again. Gourry is no longer in disguise, however Volun does not care and persistently comes on to him...!
18	18	"RETURN! The Red Priest Is Back!"; Transliteration: "Return! Aka Hōshi Futatabi!" (Japanese: Return! 赤法師ふたたび!)	Harumi Tamano	Jiro Takayama	August 4, 1995	June 16, 2002
Our heroes finally reach Sairaag. They sneak into the town under the darkness of the night and rest in the house of Sylphiel, who is one of Gourry's friends. While at the house they find out about the person who may be responsible for placing Gourry and Lina on the wanted posters. They break into the hideout of the culprit only to be ambushed by Zangulus and Vrumugun as well as one more villain, Eris, their boss. Lina slashes Vrumugun, but then she faces a man who is identical to Vrumugun. Vrumugun's true self turns out to be a clone created by Eris. When Lina is cornered by another Vrumugun, Zelgadis gallantly saves her. Is the tide turning in favor of our heroes? No, not yet. A man appears in front of them. It is Rezo. How could this be?!
19	19	"SHOCK! Sairaag Falls!"; Transliteration: "Shock! Sairāgu Hōkai!" (Japanese: Shock! サイラーグ崩壊!)	Toshihiko Tadano	Katsuhiko Chiba	August 11, 1995	June 23, 2002
Lina and her friends are shocked to see Rezo alive, standing right in front of them. At the same time, they suspect that Rezo may be a clone just like Vrumugun. They visit the Sorcery Church in order to find out more information about the clones, but discover nothing. Rezo appears again and attacks them with as much power as he used to have in their previous encounter. The Red Priest tries to take the Sword of Light from Gourry and while our heroes struggle to escape, the entire town is engulfed in fire by Rezo's powerful incantation!
20	20	"TROUBLE! Rahanimu, the Furious Fish Man!"; Transliteration: "Trouble! Arashi no Hangyojin Rahanimu" (Japanese: Trouble! 嵐の半魚人ラハニム)	Yoshiaki Iwasaki	Katsumi Hasegawa	August 18, 1995	June 30, 2002
Reciting numerous incantations for self-defense, Lina and her friends manage to defend Rezo's fierce attack. Rezo's powerful black magic destroys half of the town, yet our heroes manage to escape. They must find a way to destroy Rezo. They head for the institute where Rezo used to experiment with his magic. Rezo is still not fully recovered and needs rest. He sends Rahanimu, a monster that is half-human and half-fish, to stop our heroes. Lina and her friends battle with Rahanim who is accompanied by Zangulus. Zelgadis uses his smarts to defeat Rahanimu and our heroes get out of a pinch. They finally reach Rezo's institute.
21	21	"UPSET! Gourry vs. Zangulus"; Transliteration: "Upset! Gaurii VS Zangurusu" (Japanese: Upset! ガウリイVSザングルス)	Johei Matsuura	Yasunori Yamada	August 25, 1995	July 7, 2002
Lina, Gourry, Amelia and Sylphiel get to Rezo's museum. They break the seal by the Sword of Light and look for Rezo's secret in the underground chamber. They are caught in a trap set by Eris and become separated. While Lina searches for Gourry and Amelia, Sylphiel asks her about her relationship with Gourry. She tries not to show any feelings for Gourry other than a mere friendship. In the meantime, Gourry is in the middle of man-to-man battle with Zangulus. He is cornered by the strong opponent but Gourry uses the full force of his Sword of Light and defeats Zangulus.
22	22	"VICE! The One Who Was Left Behind"; Transliteration: "Vice! Nokosareshi Monotachi" (Japanese: Vice! 残されしものたち)	Masato Sato	Jiro Takayama	September 1, 1995	July 14, 2002
Lina and her friends rush to the lowest level of Rezo's institute. Tiva, the demon who has been guarding the institute gets in their way. Tiva is easily beaten by Lina as his magic was sealed by Rezo. Tiva guides our heroes to the lowest level and they break the last seal to enter the laboratory. The laboratory is filled with junk and as they look for Rezo's secret they have no clue what's what. Tiva pulls out a mask which allows him to unseal his magic power. Tiva then regains his power and attacks Lina and her friends. Tiva's evil magic is too powerful to destroy but our heroes manage to find a copy of the Claire Bible. All of Rezo's secrets are written in this book and they manage to crush Tiva.
23	23	"WARNING! Eris' Wrath!"; Transliteration: "Warning! Erisu no Shūnen!" (Japanese: Warning! エリスの執念!)	Takashi Kobayashi	Katsumi Hasegawa	September 8, 1995	July 21, 2002
Rezo's secret is revealed in the book found in his institute. However it is too early to celebrate as Rezo and Eris storm into the institute. Rezo has great power and Lina discovers that this Rezo is a clone controlled by a device on his forehead. Eris is also very tough. Two fiends take the book of secrets back and in a split second attach the control device on Gourry. While Lina and Amelia are busy holding down Gourry, Rezo and Eris break Rezo's seal and create Zanaffer, a demonic beast. Eris is excited to find Rezo's inheritance. Then, the clone Rezo attacks Eris. When the clone is out of Eris's control, it is awakened to his self-conscious and resists the master.
24	24	"X-DAY! The Demon Beast Is Reborn!"; Transliteration: "X-DAY Yomigaeru Majū!" (Japanese: X-DAY よみがえる魔獣!)	Harumi Tamano	Yasunori Yamada	September 15, 1995	July 28, 2002
Relieved from Eris's control, the clone Rezo assaults Lina and her friends with his own will. The clone gets the power of Zanaffer, the demonic beast, and wants to prove his new strength. He challenges Lina's Giga Slave. Lina is almost provoked into using this powerful magic until Sylphiel stops her. It may destroy the world if it gets out of control. The clone attacks Sylphiel and Lina shields her taking the clone's tremendous blow.
25	25	"YES! A Final Hope: The Blessed Blade"; Transliteration: "Yes! Saigo no Kibō Buresu Burēdo" (Japanese: Yes!最後の希望 祝福の剣(ブレス·ブレード))	Kazu Yokota	Jiro Takayama	September 22, 1995	August 4, 2002
Having been struck by the clone Rezo Lina is injured. Her friends try to help Lina escape, but even the power of Sword of Light doesn't work against the clone. Prince Philionel, Amelia's father, jumps in to help them out but he is no match for the clone Rezo. Our heroes escape into the basement of the Sacred Tree, where Lina has already entered before them. Lina is completely healed thanks to Sylphiel's cure incantation and the power of the Blessed Blade that is found there. She once again faces the clone Rezo with the Blessed Blade in her hand.
26	26	"ZAP! Victory is Always Mine!"; Transliteration: "Zap! Shōri wa Atashi no Tame ni Aru" (Japanese: Zap! 勝利はあたしのためにある)	Takashi Watanabe	Jiro Takayama	September 29, 1995	August 11, 2002
In order to have Lina and her friends come out of hiding, the clone Rezo attacks Sairaag. Gourry fights back with his Sword of Light and the others use magic incantations. Even though they fight a close battle they don't have the means to defeat him. In the nick of time, Lina appears with the Blessed Blade in her hand. They are encouraged by seeing a recuperated Lina and together our heroes fight with a renewed tenacity. The Blessed Blade absorbs the evil spirit out of the clone Rezo and he dies shortly after.

=== Season 2: Next (1996) ===
- Opening theme: Give a Reason by Megumi Hayashibara.
- Ending theme: Jama wa Sasenai (Don't Interfere) by Masami Okui.

No. overall	No. in season	Title	Original release date	English air date
27	1	"The Sudden Pinch! The Terror of the Monstrous Zoamelgustar!"; Transliteration: "Ikinari Pinchi! Majin Zoamerugusutā no Kyōfu!" (Japanese: いきなりピンチ! 魔人ゾアメルグスターの恐怖!)	April 5, 1996	August 18, 2002
Lina and Gourry hear about the famous Xoanna's Evil Book and go to the kingdom of Xoana. The kingdom's in the middle of a festival and there they cause a trouble. To their surprise, their former companion, the princess Amelia from Seyruun kingdom, appears. She came as a diplomat to stop Xoana's plan to invade other countries. She goes in to face the king of Xoana all by herself. However, her old friend, Zelgadis appears and arrests her. He was working for the king in order to get Xoana's Evil Book for himself. The king and his daughter, Martina, plan to invade Seyruun kingdom with Amelia as their hostage. However, Lina and Gourry save her when they happen to sneak in to steal the book... Being cornered, the king and Martina try to attack them with the Golems which they revived with the power of the book. Of course, they can't be a threat to Lina. With her Dragu Slave, she blows away the Golems and Xoana's castle together and destroys the king and Martina's vicious plan.
28	2	"The Roguish Priest! His Name is Xellos!"; Transliteration: "Fuzaketa Purīsuto! Sono Na wa Zerosu!" (Japanese: ふざけた神官[プリースト]! その名はゼロス!)	April 12, 1996	August 25, 2002
Lina and others continue their journey to help Zelgadis find a copy of Claire Bible. They meet a priest who calls himself Xellos. He asks them to help him get his Bible back. Being suspicious of his story, they head to the hideout of the bandits who he says stole the Bible. Lina and Gourry slip into the hideout, disguised as bounty hunters. However, the bandits had already known their identities because Xellos had informed them. The bandits surround them, but they're no match for them. Lina and Gourry beat the bandits. They go after the bandit's boss to find Xellos there. He trapped them to find out where the Bible was. Now he's got the Bible and disappears with a mysterious word to them.
29	3	"A Wonderful Business! Being a Bodyguard isn't Easy!"; Transliteration: "Suteki na Shōbai! Yōjinbō mo Raku ja nai!" (Japanese: 素敵な商売! 用心棒も楽じゃない!)	April 19, 1996	September 1, 2002
Lina's party arrives at Atlas City. They get into an argument for a trifle and separate into Lina and Gourry, Amelia and Zelgadis groups. Talim and Damia, who are in important positions at the Sorcerer Association, approach each party and ask them to be their bodyguards. They are blinded by the large amount of money they offer and take the job. Soon they start harassing each other. However, neither sides can come up with the decisive blow and they decide to settle by one-on-one duel by the bodyguards. Lina and others show up at the duel to realize what was going on and get stunned. Then, all of sudden, beasts come out of Talim and Damia's house and put the whole city in a panic. Lina and others settle the panic for the time being, but Talim and Damia are put into jail because they caused the panic. As a result, Lina and others do not get paid and get stunned...
30	4	"An Ancient Pledge! One Who Seeks Immortality!"; Transliteration: "Inishie no Keiyaku! Fushi o Motomeru Mono!" (Japanese: いにしえの契約! 不死を求める者!)	April 26, 1996	September 8, 2002
After Tarim and Demia get put into Jail, Lina and the others decide to pay them a visit to enquire about the simultaneous summoning of the beasts from both houses. They're told that the only person they know who could perform such a spell would be Halciform, who was once working on research into immortality. So they continue to Halciform's house (the only one untouched by the beasts), where they find out that Halciform has allied himself with a Mazoku called Seigram and that Halciform has been somewhat successful in his efforts to become immortal by making a pledge with Seigram. Lina reluctantly decides to put a stop to it and a showdown ensues resulting in Halciform being sealed in ice. Xellos appears and confirms what Lina says about destroying the Pledge stone being one of the few ways to defeat him...
31	5	"Staying Behind For the Sake of Love!"; Transliteration: "Nokosareshi Ai Yue ni!" (Japanese: 残されし愛ゆえに!)	May 3, 1996	September 15th, 2002
Lina and the others frantically search for the pledge stone in Halciform's house but to no avail. Soon they are confronted with the recently thawed Halciform and to avoid a futile battle they escape into the sewers. As Lina and Gourry are teleported away, Amelia and Zelgadis are left to defeat the slugs (of which Lina has an acute fear) that live in the sewers. Lina and Gourry were summoned to a room where Seigram was sitting. He claimed that he has been looking for powerful people to join him and proposes that Lina does the same and will be freed from her "ridiculous fate" and granted immortality. Lina refuses and finds out that Amelia and Zelgadis have been captured and their life energy will be drained so that Halciform can bring back his girlfriend, Rubia, from the dead. Lina discovers that the pledge stone is Seigram's mask and challenges Halciform to one last battle. The pledge stone is destroyed and Halciform becomes weak. Rubia becomes animated by the life energy. She softly whispers to Halciform "Kill me...". Halciform casts Burst Flare; killing Rubia and himself.
32	6	"You Can't Escape! The Return of the Obsessive Martina!"; Transliteration: "Nigasanai! Shūnen no Maruchina Futatabi!" (Japanese: 逃がさない! 執念のマルチナふたたび!)	May 10, 1996	September 22, 2002
Martina returns in this episode, starving for vengeance against Lina Inverse. She has created a curse to put on Lina, but needs one of Lina's possessions to complete it. While they are staying at an Inn, Martina dresses up as a maid and sneaks in to steal something of Lina's, but runs into Gourry and promptly falls in love with him. Martina is able to steal Lina's headband and puts the curse on her, a spell that causes whatever damage Lina does to someone else to be reflected back onto her. Lina, Gourry, Zel, and Amelia all fight Martina to try to break the curse, but Martina refuses to fight Gourry because she has decided that they are engaged. Martina sees how clueless Gourry is when he doesn't even know what the word fiance means and so her brief period of being in love with Gourry ends as quickly as it began. In the mess of the fight Martina accidentally puts the curse on herself, and after a dogfight between Lina and Martina the curse is lifted from both of them.
33	7	"Sudden Cooking! Follow the Phantom Dragon!"; Transliteration: "Bikkuri Kukkingu! Maboroshi no Doragon o Oe!" (Japanese: びっくり料理(クッキング)! 幻のドラゴンを追え!)	May 17, 1996	September 29, 2002
Lina and the gang stop at a restaurant that is serving Dragon Cuisine, supposedly the most delicious food in existence. They are furious though when they realize they've been tricked, until the head chef comes back and scolds his underlings for trying to trick them. He promises them that with their help, they will go out and slay a dragon, and he will make them a full course dragon cuisine meal. They are sorely unprepared though and the dragon kicks their butts. Finally they are able to kill the dragon, but they find out the preparations for the meal will take 6 months, and so, forcibly dragging Lina with them, the group departs.
34	8	"Be Eternal! The Day Prince Phil Died?"; Transliteration: "Eien Nare! Firu-san ga Shinda Hi?" (Japanese: 永遠なれ! フィルさんが死んだ日?)	May 24, 1996	October 6, 2002
The group finally makes it to Seyruun only to be greeted by ominously deserted streets. They get to the palace and find out Prince Phil, Amelia's father, was assassinated. Amelia tearfully swears to bring the criminals to justice and drags everyone along to the crime scene to look for evidence. There they are attacked by monsters and saved by a masked figure who turns out to be Crown Prince Phil! When Phil was attacked he pretended to be dead so he could find out who was behind the plot to seize the throne.
35	9	"Hidden Ambitions! The Shocking Confession?"; Transliteration: "Himerareshi Yabō! Shōgeki no Kokuhaku?" (Japanese: 秘められし野望! 衝撃の告白?)	May 31, 1996	October 13, 2002
Lina's party finds out that the evils are after Seyruun kingdom, and go into the castle with Phil. What waited them there were, the second successor of the kingship, Christopher, and Kanzel and Magenta who hang out in the castle. Kanzel and Magenta are apparently suspicious, but since there's no proof, Lina can't do anything about them. Then she receives a letter from Christopher's son, Alfred. Lina and Amelia go to Alfred's house as the letter requested. Alfred confesses to them that Christopher's behind the whole incident. And he asks them to give him the time to persuade Christopher to turn himself in. Then the demons, which found out about the Christopher's betrayal, come to attack. Lina's party manage to chase them away by widening the barrier around the kingdom. However, as a result, Lina loses her magical power.
36	10	"On a Journey With a Pack of Scoundrels?! Take Back That Magic Power!"; Transliteration: "Kuse Mono Zoroi no Chindōchū?! Maryoku o Torimodose!" (Japanese: クセ者ぞろいの珍道中?! 魔力を取り戻せ!)	June 7, 1996	October 20, 2002
Lina decides to visit a magic doctor who resides deep in the mountains in order to regain her magical power. However, on the way, Xellos and Martina, who now is in love with him, forcefully join her. Although Xellos' told Martina not to seek revenge on Lina, she hasn't forgotten about it and starts harassing her. To make the matter worse, the evils appear to attack her. Xellos chases them away with his strong spell, which the power was increased by his Talisman. Lina sort of "snatches" it away from him and makes it her own.
37	11	"Voices from the Darkness! Slash 'em to Bits, Ragna Blade!"; Transliteration: "Semari Kuru Yami no Koe! Kirisake Raguna Burēdo!" (Japanese: 迫り来る闇の声! 切り裂けラグナ·ブレード!)	June 14, 1996	October 27, 2002
Lina can't regain her magical power and gets depressed. Then she notices a signal fire going up in Seyruun kingdom. That's a sign for when something should happen there. In Seyruun, the demon, Kanzel, and others are in the castle to kidnap Phil. Gourry and others try to fight back, but Kanzel's spell pulls them into another dimension and forces them a hard battle. Lina struggles to get to Seyruun. Gourry and others cannot help her from another dimension. Lina tries out the Talisman, which she bought from Xellos, and increases her magical power just for a moment. She uses the spell, which she's never used before, Ragna Blade, and cuts open the door to another dimension. She helps Gourry and others out of another dimension, but loses Phil to the evils.
38	12	"The Unexpected End? The Shocking Truth!"; Transliteration: "Dondengaeshi? Igai Naru Shinjitsu!" (Japanese: ドンデン返し? 意外なる真実!)	June 21, 1996	November 3, 2002
Lina's party is depressed from Phil being captured by the demons. In the meantime, Christopher, who they thought would be the next king because of what Alfred told them, declares that he won't be the king. Then what was with Alfred's word which told them that Christopher was behind the whole incident? Lina and others go to Alfred's house in the suburb to find out the truth. Having lain in wait for them, Alfred tells them that he was the one who was behind the incident. He did it because he was going to let his father be the king first and then afterwards himself. However, then, the demons, Magenta, releases an arrow, and it goes through Alfred's body. The evils finally show their true intentions that they were gonna betray Alfred and rule Seyruun.
39	13	"Impending Fall! The Moment of Ambition's Defeat!"; Transliteration: "Tsuiraku Sunzen! Yabō no Tsuieru Toki!" (Japanese: 墜落寸前! 野望のついえる時!)	June 28, 1996	November 10, 2002
Lina's party beats Magenta, and are psyched up for beating Kanzel. However, Kanzel's power was incomparable to Magenta's and strong. They struggle, but get thrown out of the air garden. However, Lina's regained her magical power by beating Magenta. She pretends that she still doesn't have the power, and gets Kanzel off guard. However, since Kanzel's spell was gone, the air garden above Seyruun starts descending. There was no time to let the people escape. Lina takes a chance on blowing away the air garden with talisman-empowered Dragu Slave.
40	14	"The Forbidden Dance? Where is the Strongest Spell?"; Transliteration: "Kindan no Dansu? Saikyō Jumon wa Doko da!" (Japanese: 禁断のダンス? 最強呪文はどこだ!)	July 5, 1996	November 17, 2002
Lina's party learns about the presence of a high level demon, called evil Dragon Lord, Garv, behind the series of recent evil activity. They hit the road to get a copy of Claire Bible to fight him. The first clue they get is a map they bought from a man, named Dio. The map shows the location of a copy which includes the most powerful spell. They go out to get it, and end up fighting with twin sisters who got the book first. Finally, they get the book, only to find out it was not the Bible. Lina and Amelia try out the spell which requires a party of two to chant, and find out it is just a dance instruction. Outraged Lina uses Dragu Slave on Dio, who sold the map to her, and the dance instruction becomes the sisters' possession.
41	15	"A Big Crash? The Battle at Artemay Tower!"; Transliteration: "Dai Gekitotsu? Tatakai no Arteme Tō!" (Japanese: 大激突? 戦いのアルテメ塔!)	July 12, 1996	November 24, 2002
Lina's party continues their journey to find the Claire Bible. They get the information from Xellos that one of the copies of the Bible is in the tower, called Arteme, which turns its intruders into a doll. They get to the tower to see dolls just as they were told. Lina's party disguises themselves in costumes (with Lina, Gourry, Amelia, Zelgadis, Martina, and Xellos dressed as a horse, a jellyfish, a star, a bunny, a lobster, and a fish, respectively) and go in. They encounter a demon who calls himself Joe. They survive the battle with the dolls which Joe controls, and face Joe at the highest floor. However, no matter what they use on him, he is undamaged. They struggle, find out the doll beside him is Joe himself, and win the battle. But again, it turns out, they wasted time without finding the Bible.
42	16	"Bitter Curve Balls! Gutsy Fast Balls!"; Transliteration: "Urami no Makyū! Konjō no Gōsokkyū!" (Japanese: 恨みの魔球! 根性の豪速球!)	July 19, 1996	December 1, 2002
Lina's party gets to a town and gets the information that a copy of the Bible is on the trophy which is given to the winner of a magic tennis competition. However, Martina, who also joined the competition, beats Lina to a pulp with her magical service. Outraged Lina starts a hard practice with a coach, named Rude. Lina and Martina reenter the competition and make wins by fast balls and magical services. They face each other at the finals. Martina presses Lina with split magical balls. However, with her guts and sly means to blind Martina with a light, Lina wins. However, the copy of the Bible is fake as was easily anticipated, and again, they wasted their time.
43	17	"They're Talking About a Girl Named Zelgadis?"; Transliteration: "Uwasa no Kanojo wa Zerugadisu?" (Japanese: うわさの彼女はゼルガディス?)	August 2, 1996	December 8, 2002
Lina's party gets the information that a copy of the Bible is in the country where only women live. Of course, the guys are not allowed to go in, so they get into drags. Zelgadis absolutely hates it. Lina's party meets the daughter of the king, Mivan. She escaped from the country because she was forced to be a princess. Zelgadis relates to her, who's having problem with her status as the daughter of the king, and grows sympathetic feelings for her. Then monsters appear and take her hostage. Lina's party fights a hard battle with the monsters that are made of water. Zelgadis lights up himself and hurls himself at the monsters and beats them. But because of this, his identity as a man is revealed. Lina and her friends are immediately captured and are ordered to be executed by the queen. Mivan is encouraged by what he did and reveals her own identity. Mivan tells Zelgadis and the others that "she" is a boy who's been forced to dress as a girl (by his mother, the queen) to live in the country.
44	18	"The Temple of the Sand! The Secret of the Giga Slave!"; Transliteration: "Suna no Shinden! Giga Sureibu no Himitsu!" (Japanese: 砂の神殿! ギガスレイブの秘密!)	August 9, 1996	December 15, 2002
While Lina's party continues to look for a copy of the Bible, Xellos brings them the information that a perfect copy is at a castle nearby. They get there to be stunned by the volume of the copies. They go through the pile to get the information they want, and they meet the librarian who calls herself Auntie Aqua. She tells them that she'll lead them to the information they are looking for, and they go deep into the castle. The same night, when Lina wakes up unexpectedly, Aqua shows her one of the copies of the Bible. It is about what happens if the sealed spell, Giga Slave gets out of control. Lina is stunned to learn that the spell has perished the world to end. Then the evil dragon lord, Gaav appears..
45	19	"Disclosure at Last? Xellos's True Form!"; Transliteration: "Tsui ni Hakkaku? Zerosu no Shōtai!" (Japanese: ついに発覚っ? ゼロスの正体!)	August 11, 1996	December 22, 2002
The evil Dragon Lord, Gaav, presses Lina's party. He came to kill Lina so he can stop the evil's plan to perish the world. He requests Xellos who has been behind the plan to confess it. Xellos, who has been one of Lina's travel companions, turns out to be a demon. However, since Xellos does not give up, Gaav attacks them relentlessly and puts Lina's party into a pinch. Aqua stops Gaav's attack and have Lina's party warped to outside of the castle. Aqua turns out to be a presence which was created by the remained will by the aqua lord who was perished by Gaav. Lina's party barely escapes and, following Aqua's word, leaves to Katarth mountain range where the real Claire Bible is.
46	20	"No Other Choice! Set Course for Dragon Valley!"; Transliteration: "Ikukkya nai! Doragon no Tani o Mezase!" (Japanese: いくっきゃないっ! ドラゴンの谷を目指せ!)	August 16, 1996	December 29, 2002
After barely escaping from Gaav, Lina's party heads to Dragon Valley in Katarth mountain range to find a copy of Claire Bible. They meet a boy who offers to lead them to the valley. They get to the valley with him to meet the old head of the Dragon tribe, Milgasia. Xellos asks him to take them to the Bible, so he does, but Gaav's demons attack them again.
47	21	"The Thousand Year Old Truth! The Traitorous Demon Dragon King!"; Transliteration: "Sen Nen no Shinjitsu! Uragiri no Maryūō!" (Japanese: 千年の真実! 裏切りの魔竜王!)	August 23, 1996	January 5, 2003
Lina's party gets away from the demons and go into the cave where the Bible is supposed to be. Deep inside the cave, Lina enters the gate to the other side where the Bible is sealed. Martina rushes in to enter with her. Lina reaches the Bible to hear the truth about the Lord of Nightmare, which is the power source of Giga Slave and Ragna Blade. On the other hand, Gourry and others fight the demons outside of the gate. Gaav appears, injures Xellos, puts Lina in a pinch when she comes out of the gate.
48	22	"The Stolen Sword of Light! The End of the Demon Dragon King!"; Transliteration: "Ubawareta Hikari no Ken! Maryūō Saigo no Toki!" (Japanese: 奪われた光の剣! 魔竜王最後の時!)	August 30, 1996	January 12, 2003
Gaav puts Lina's party in a pinch. Then appears the most powerful evil Lord, Phibrizzo, who came after the traitor Garv. With his power, he beats Gaav easily. He tells Lina's party to come to Sairaag for another plan. He leaves, taking Gourry hostage for it.
49	23	"The Menacing Swordsman! A Journey of Reunion!"; Transliteration: "Kyōi no Makenshi! Saikai no Tabiji!" (Japanese: 脅威の魔剣士! 再会の旅路!)	September 6, 1996	January 19, 2003
Lina's party gets depressed for having lost Gourry. Sylphiel, who fought with them in Sairaag, appears, learns of Gourry, and decides to fight with them. On their way to Sairaag, they get attacked by a sorcerer with the Sword of Light. His incredible skill puts them in a pinch, but Zangulus, who once was their enemy, appears and helps them. With his help, Lina gives the sorcerer a blow. Under his mask appears brain-washed Gourry's face.
50	24	"Sinister Trap! The Mysterious City of Ghosts!"; Transliteration: "Jaaku naru Wana! Maboroshi no Shiryō Toshi!" (Japanese: 邪悪なる罠! 幻の死霊都市!)	September 13, 1996	January 26, 2003
Lina's party gets to Sairaag to rescue Gourry. Sairaag was destroyed by the battle with clone Rezo, but now it's revived as the town of the dead by Phibrizzo's magic. Sylphiel and others get angry to find out about it. Lina decides to go into Phibrizzo's castle by herself because Phibrizzo is powerful and she didn't want to get the others involved. Sylphiel notices it and forcefully joins her, and also Zangulus.
51	25	"The Souls of the Dead! Lina's Final Decision!"; Transliteration: "Shiseru Mono no Tamashii! Rina Saigo no Ketsudan!" (Japanese: 死せる者の魂! リナ最後の決断!)	September 20, 1996	February 2, 2003
Lina's party faces Phibrizzo, but none of their magic works on him. Phibrizzo intends to have Lina use Giga Slave and let it out of control, so he tries to make her exhausted and press her. Zangulus and Sylphiel are beaten, Zelgadis and others are confined into crystals. Phibrizzo pushes Lina, who's left alone, to use Giga Slave, saying Gourry will die otherwise. The moment the crystal, which Gourry's in, starts cracking, Lina finally uses Giga Slave.
52	26	"Go to NEXT! And Then Again..."; Transliteration: "Go to NEXT! Soshite Mata..." (Japanese: Go to NEXT! そしてまた...)	September 27, 1996	February 9, 2003
Giga Slave gets out of control, and the golden space beyond Lord, the Lord of Nightmares puts Lina unconscious. Phibrizzo attacks her without knowing it, and gets destroyed easily. Gourry and others are freed from Fiblizo's magic now, but Lina's about to be swallowed into chaos. Gourry rushes out to rescue Lina and when he did, the Lord of Nightmares lets Lina go proving that she isn't evil at all. Lina and Gourry hug as they and Zelgadis and Amelia went to Martina and Zangulas' wedding.

=== Season 3: Try (1997) ===
- Opening theme: Breeze by Megumi Hayashibara.
- Ending theme: Don't be Discouraged by Megumi Hayashibara.
- Ending theme 2: Somewhere by Houko Kuwashima in episode 26.

No. overall	No. in season	Title	Original release date	English air date
53	1	"Majestic? Hoist Sails for the Journey!"; Transliteration: "Ifū Dōdō? Tabidachi no Ho o Agero!" (Japanese: 威風堂々?旅立ちの帆をあげろ!)	April 4, 1997	July 3, 2004
After killing Phibrizzo, a barrier that was holding them in for a thousand of years (or so), has been removed, arranged by Phil (Amelia's father). Lina gets a letter from someone named Filia, who wants to meet her and offers her money (something Lina can't refuse). While looking for her, they meet up with Zelgadis, who doesn't mind on coming along. His true intention was to go to the other lands and try to find a cure for himself. Filia shows up and wants to talk in private, so they go into a more secluded place. When Filia starts to talk, Gourry does something that is far unexpected. After seeing a tail, he looks under her skirt. Freaking her out, she grabs a mallet of some sort, hits Gourry and runs away. Things get settled, and they meet with her again, just when the boats are leaving. She tells them about wanting to test their strength and disappears. Suddenly a gold dragon appears, attacking the boats. Amelia joins the fight on this golden dragon attack. A few spells go off, and Lina decides to end it with a Dragu Slave. It then causes a tsunami, heading for the port sinking every ship (except theirs). They all decide to set off on that new adventure, when they really running away, hoping they won't get busted
54	2	"Doubtful? A Letter from Home!"; Transliteration: "Hanshin Hangi? Kokyō kara no Tegami ni!" (Japanese: 半信半疑?故郷からの手紙に!)	April 11, 1997	July 10, 2004
On the verge on dying, since they have no food on the ship, seagulls are trying to eat Gourry. Zelgadis figures out that there must be land nearby, and Lina starts to go a lot of wind spells pushing them closer to land. Once on land, they notice several creatures attacking the townsfolk. Lina and the group save the townspeople and they reward them by giving them all you can eat food. After their meal, they are shocked to see that the golden dragon they thought they killed is still alive. They rush to the landing site, only to be semi-shocked/surprised that the golden dragon turns back into Filia. Filia then reveals the usual, the world is going to end which Lina is hesitant to do. Filia then gives her something in case something like this would happen. It's a letter from Lina's older sister, Luna, saying "Just do it." Filia then reveals they need to go to the temple of the Fire Dragon King, so off they go!
55	3	"Where'd That Arrogant Guy Go?"; Transliteration: "Bōjaku Bujin na Aitsu wa Doko e?" (Japanese: 傍若無人なアイツはどこへ?)	April 18, 1997	July 11, 2004
Lina and the gang starts to put off on going to the Fire Dragon King temple, and decide to check out the current city they are in. Needless to say, Lina and Gourry are checking out the food; Zelgadis is wandering around looking at old temples for a possible cure, causing some ruckus with locals; and Amelia loves the view, so she decides to go up to the highest point of the city, drawing a crowd below her. After casting a few spells, Zelgadis is labelled as a demon (his looks and spells) and Amelia is labelled as an angel, when curing someone. Filia is upset at this, and tells them that this part of the word could only do simple spells. Suddenly Filia senses evil, and Lina swears she has seen Xellos. Yes. It was him. Lina thinks this whole prophecy thing might be connected with the demon race. When finally heading out of the city, Lina and the gang are attacked by someone named Valgaav, someone who served under Gaav. He starts to pick a fight with them.
56	4	"On the Move! He's Out for Revenge?"; Transliteration: "Tōhon Seisō! Yatsu no Nerai wa Katakiuchi?" (Japanese: 東奔西走!ヤツの狙いはカタキ討ち?)	April 25, 1997	July 17, 2004
Lina and her friends meet Valgaav, Demon King Gaav's last but most loyal minion who comes to kill Lina claiming that she killed his master under the rumors of the Hellmaster Phibrizo.
57	5	"A Wild Rumor! You Can't Have Smoke Without Fire?"; Transliteration: "Ryūgen Higo? Honō o Hakanakya Kemuri wa Tatanu?" (Japanese: 流言飛語?炎を吐かなきゃ煙は立たぬ?)	May 2, 1997	July 18, 2004
Filia encounters trouble in a town where her kind is not allowed. When Lina's gang rushes to help her, Xellos's insults unleash Filia's anger, and the whole town pays the price!
58	6	"Wandering Around? The Runaway Shrine Takes a Trip!"; Transliteration: "Rurō Ruten? Bōsō Shinden no Tabi o!" (Japanese: 流浪流転?暴走神殿の旅を!)	May 9, 1997	July 24, 2004
Lina and the gang reach an ancient temple which turns out to be an ancient train heading towards the temple of the Fire Dragon Temple. It is powered by magic, so Lina and the rest can't use anything. They are heading nearer and nearer, and they figure to get their magic back, they'd need to find the source that is collecting their magic. Lina decides to cast Dragu Slave against the train, but it didn't work, and they end up only breaking part of the temple.
59	7	"A Peace Conference? This is the Dragu Shrine?"; Transliteration: "Wahei Kaidan? Kore ga Doragon no Shinden ka?" (Japanese: 和平会談?これがドラゴンの神殿か?)	May 16, 1997	July 25, 2004
Lina and the gang are tricked to rebuild the temple they broke. When they are done, they demand answers about the prophecy only to have Almayce show up.
60	8	"Be Careful! The Plan has Begun!"; Transliteration: "Yōi Shūtō! Keikaku wa Ugokidashita!" (Japanese: 用意周到!計画は動き出した!)	May 23, 1997	July 31, 2004
The Elder are sketchy with Lina, trying to save the world, but she gives them and everyone else and sample on what she could do. She uses the Ragna Blade spell, cutting (but not killing) Almayce. Valgaav is upset that Almayce told him to stay back, and decides to go to the temple, wanting his revenge on Lina. He then proceeds to partially transform into an ancient Dragon, who is far more powerful than other dragons. In the war a thousand years ago, the golden dragons attempted to wipe them out, afraid that they might try to rule the world. After being horribly wounded by the transformed and enraged Valgaav, Almayce somehow gets away amidst the confusion.
61	9	"Continuous Fire! The Wind-Swept Shore of Battle!"; Transliteration: "Renzoku Hassha! Tatakai no Araiso!" (Japanese: 連続発射!戦いの荒磯!)	May 30, 1997	August 1, 2004
Lina and the gang split in two different groups, Xellos, Amelia and Zelgadis in one, while Lina, Gourry and Filia in another. They need to explore two different cities at the same time that seems to be holding magical vessels. The two countries, Alto, and Bantone hate each other, and Lina and the group experiences their daily cannonball fight against each other. We find out that the King's daughter of Alto, Sera, had befriended and fallen in love with the Queen's son of Bantone, Marco. Both sides, approach each group and they have a plan on stealing the magical vessels. As they do that in the middle of the night, both sides is alerted somehow. They all head for a tiny island that seems to be in the middle of the sea that is blocking them, and each city heads there too. Wait there is even more... creatures show up wanting to take the magical vessels what will Lina and the gang do next?
62	10	"Ready for Exile! Isn't Two People's Love Eternal?"; Transliteration: "Tsuihō Kakugo! Futari no Ai wa Eien yo ne?" (Japanese: 追放覚悟!二人の愛は永遠よね?)	June 6, 1997	August 7, 2004
One of the creatures named Gravos, has the double-headed Sword of Light looking weapon. He uses it against Lina and the gang, breaking the island in several pieces, separating Sera and Marco from them. Filia, Zelgadis and Amelia go after the kids, while Lina and Gourry fight Gravos. Filia, Zelgadis and Amelia catch up with the kids, and Marco starts hating Sera. They refuse to help each other, so Amelia and Zelgadis step up to use the magical vessels, which we find out it was weapons from the ancient times, representing Holy and Dark powers. Gravos starts to lose control of the weapon, and Lina decides to do a Dragu Slave to stop it. Then suddenly, it went away, thanks to Zelgadis and Amelia, but it's too late for Lina, and she casts her Dragu Slave. In the end a bridge shows up connecting the two kingdoms, and Sera and Marco truly hate each other. Lina is surprised to see that the magical vessels are broken, thanks to Zelgadis and Amelia when hitting together too hard.
63	11	"The Hurdle's Cleared? Jiras' Hidden Power!"; Transliteration: "Nankan Toppa? Otoko Jirasu no Sokojikara!" (Japanese: 難関突破?男ジラスの底力!)	June 13, 1997	August 8, 2004
Lina and the gang get tricked by Jillas who tells them that a great power is on top of this funny looking mountain. They get paired by couples: Lina/Zelgadis, Gourry/Amelia, and Filia/Xellos, which Filia ultimately refuses. This pairing also upsets Amelia. After some minor fights and tricks by Jillas, Gourry's recklessness causes the mountain to tip over, and he loses his Sword of Light to Jillas!
64	12	"Selfless and Senseless! Pursuit Through the Labyrinth!"; Transliteration: "Muga Muchū! Meikyū no Tsuiseki-kō!" (Japanese: 無我夢中!迷宮の追跡行!)	June 20, 1997	August 14, 2004
Jillas runs into a cave as the team gives chase. Once again, they are split it groups, Lina/Gourry, Amelia/Zelgadis, and Filia/Xellos. Amelia/Zelgadis runs into Jillas, and takes the Sword of Light back. Lina/Gourry find Almayce sleeping and wake him up accidentally. We find out his true plans, is not summoning Dark Star, Dark Lord of the Overworld, but wanting to destroy him. Meanwhile with Filia/Xellos, they decide to split ways when hitting a fork in the Labyrinth. Xellos isn't fooled by Filia's way to trick him also, so they both head in the same direction (even though Filia doesn't know it). Filia hears voices, and is not surprised (yet shocked) to see Xellos trying to cut a deal with Valgaav, who tells him his objective was to bring him to the demon side. What will Valgaav do?
65	13	"An Explosive Situation! The One Who Holds the Key!"; Transliteration: "Isshoku Sokuhatsu! Kagi o Nigiru Mono!" (Japanese: 一触即発!鍵を握る者!)	June 27, 1997	August 15, 2004
As Valgaav refuses Xellos's offer, Lina and the gang show up, along with Almayce. They get into a little fight with Valgaav, and Gourry again loses his sword, but to Valgaav this time. Valgaav attempts to open the gateway, but without the rest of the weapons, it is a risky maneuver.
66	14	"Striding and Swaggering! Lamentation Without End!"; Transliteration: "Ōkō Kappo! Owari Naki Dōkoku!" (Japanese: 横行闊歩!終わりなき慟哭!)	July 4, 1997	August 21, 2004
As Valgaav open the gateway, Lina decides to use the Giga Slave to stop him, but two figures show up with the other two Sword of Light items, and close the gateway. As this happens, there is a big explosion, following Lina floating on a debris in the ocean somewhere.
67	15	"Disaster and Danger? This Place is a Wonder Island!"; Transliteration: "Yakunan Kinan? Koko wa Fushigi no Shima!" (Japanese: 厄難危難?ここは不思議の島!)	July 11, 1997	August 22, 2004
After being washed ashore from the events of the previous episode and inexplicably put in a dress, Lina wanders around in several worlds guided by a pig. She finds Zelgadis in costume, and decide to break out of this utter nonsense. She uses a Dragu Slave, breaking a wall, and they both find out they are in a theme park where you could travel the world, as Filia, who was busy having a good time, reunites with them.
68	16	"Pandemonium! Terror of the Cursed Jar!"; Transliteration: "Kenken Gōgō! Norowareta Tsubo no Kyōfu!" (Japanese: 喧々囂々!呪われた壺の恐怖!)	July 18, 1997	August 28, 2004
Lina, Filia and Zelgadis escape the island but their boat has a hole and they end up getting picked up by a ship which turns out to be haunted. The gang attempt to solve the mystery so the ghost can move on to the next world.
69	17	"Immediate Results? Love is in the Tiny Differences!"; Transliteration: "Kōka Tekimen? Koi no Yukue wa Kamihitoe!" (Japanese: 効果覿面?恋の行方は紙一重!)	July 25, 1997	August 29, 2004
The episode started with Amelia on an island, saved by fish people. She finds out that one of the fish-girl, Lila, is in love with a human, Kerel, when she saved him from a shipwreck. The father of the girl, Honar, objects at first, but their love is stronger. There is an ancient spell that could change her into human. The only thing is, they need a beautiful young woman to get the stone off a sea creature from. Amelia finds a starving Gourry, dresses him up in drag, and they manage to get the jewel of the sea creatures head. When they try to do the spell, it doesn't work. The father feared this might of happen, and reveals they would have to kiss each other to prove their love. This would then transform them oppose each other (she becomes human, he becomes a fish) to prove they actually love each other. Of course, they kiss and each other turns shape.
70	18	"The Right Person in the Right Place! Amelia in the Village of Justice!"; Transliteration: "Tekizai Tekisho! Seigi no Sato no Ameria!" (Japanese: 適材適所!正義の里のアメリア!)	August 1, 1997	September 4, 2004
Gourry and Amelia visit a land with a demon problem, and are tasked with confronting the creatures. Before the battle ends, they find that the "demons" are rather familiar...
71	19	"Three People, Three Ways! Where the Light Leads!"; Transliteration: "Sansha San'yō! Hikari no Shimesu Saki!" (Japanese: 三者三様!光の示す先!)	August 8, 1997	September 5, 2004
Almayce sends out several creatures looking for the last weapon. As the monsters ravage all the towns in their way, Lina and the gang try to stop them, but end up having to deal with Erulogos and then Jillas, who has a new weapon, a bomb that is as powerful as a Dragu Slave.
72	20	"A Hero's Advent? To Whom does the Young Girl Pray?"; Transliteration: "Yūsha Kōrin? Shōjo no Inori wa Dare no Tame?" (Japanese: 勇者降臨?少女の祈りは誰のため?)	August 15, 1997	September 6, 2004
Lina and the gang goes to an old town that was once populated with a lot of people due to its water and gold source, thinking that the last weapon might be there. Once all the gold (and the water) was gone, people left. Erulogs, one of Almayce's men, shows up and fights them. He end up destroying most of the town, which was sort of a good thing. Underneath the town, water was there hidden there that they were longing for, for many years now.
73	21	"Savage and Unexplored! History Sealed Away!"; Transliteration: "Mikai Mitō! Fūjirareta Rekishi!" (Japanese: 未開未踏!封じられた歴史!)	August 22, 1997	September 11, 2004
Lina and the gang reach a temple, which turns out to be an ancient temple for the graves of the Ancient Dragons, that was slaughter by the Golden Dragons. It is sealed off by several magical barriers that Filia could easily break through. Except for one that was sealed by the Ancient Dragons themselves, holding the final weapon. We learn the back story on why the Golden Dragons killed the Ancient Dragons, they feared their power and that's why all (except Valgaav, who escaped) was killed. While this is happening, Xellos has a plan on his own, he decided to befriend Sirus, in an attempt to bring back Dark Star. Almayce tries to talk to Xellos about this, while Lina and the gang fight of Erulogs, except for Filia who is trying to get the final weapon. To Lina's shock all of the Golden Dragons appear.
74	22	"Eternal Death, Final Farewells! A Cry to the Fallen!"; Transliteration: "Eisei Eiketsu! Taoreshi Mono e no Sakebi!" (Japanese: 永逝永訣!倒れし者への叫び!)	August 29, 1997	September 12, 2004
Erulogs and Sirus goes on a killing spree, killing on what it looks like to be hundred of Golden Dragons. Lina manages to get away to Filia, seeing if she could get the last item. Filia can't so Lina decides to use the Ragna Blade spell to try to break the barrier. It works, and Lina takes a hold of the crossbow, she fires a shot, displaying its power. Almayce demands the weapon, but Lina refuses to give it to him. He declares an all out war on them, but is killed by Erulogs as they come back to the room. Xellos manages to get away and steals the weapon (by appearing in the back of Lina giving her a "karate chop" on her neck) and runs off with Erulogs and Sirius... what will happen next?
75	23	"No Time for Arguing! Head for the Showdown!"; Transliteration: "Mondō Muyō! Kessen no Chi o Mezase!" (Japanese: 問答無用!決戦の地を目指せ!)	September 5, 1997	September 18, 2004
Filia tells the Elder that she is renouncing her role as a temple priestess. Lina and the gang head to the center gateway known as the Ray of Light, with hopes to stop Xellos, Sirius, and Erulogos. There, they bump into Jillias. Filia manages to save him from detonating one of his bombs, so Jillias allies with Lina's group. Xellos reveals his true plan, which is to destroy the Dark Star. Will Lina and the gang make it
76	24	"No way to Guess! The Forbidden Gateway is Opened!"; Transliteration: "Suisoku Funō! Hirakareshi Kindan no Mon!" (Japanese: 推測不能!開かれし禁断の門!)	September 12, 1997	September 19, 2004
Sirius and Erulogos decide to join with Lina and the gang to destroy Dark Star, who manages to emerge from the gateway. They manage to close the gate, which means Dark Star's power is about half of its full potential. They fight, but then Dark Star takes off and heads to the Fire Dragon's temple. A voice calls for the Golden Dragons, and the gang realize who it is... it's Valgaav.
77	25	"He Who Emerges from the Dark Star!"; Transliteration: "Yami no Hoshi yori Izuru Mono!" (Japanese: 闇の星より出ずる者!)	September 19, 1997	September 25, 2004
Valgaav reveals both the Dark Lord, Dark Star, and the God, Vophied, wanted to purify the world. In doing so, they would recreate everything, meaning killing everyone and starting over. Lina and the gang tries to fight him, but a Dragu Slave would not work. Valgaav tries to talk to them, but moves onto another location
78	26	"TRY Again! When All Returns to White!"; Transliteration: "TRY again! Shiroku Kaerishi Toki!" (Japanese: TRY again!白く還りし刻!)	September 26, 1997	September 26, 2004
Filia figures out where Valgaav is going, and transport her last huge power to the Ancient Dragon temple. Erulogs get killed by Valgaav, so Lina decides to do something by combining all of the five weapons (that Dark Star created) and using Filia's Holy Power, and Xellos' Dark power (as well as she casting a spell). They manage to kill him and save the world again (for the third time) where they all decide to start a new beginning. Gourry decides to give his Sword of Light to Sirius who will take the rest of the weapons back to his world. Filia spots something floating, which turns out to be what is left of Valgaav (a baby Ancient Dragon) and cares for it. In the end, they all part ways, Amelia goes back to Seyruun, Zelgadis goes on his own way, Filia opens a shop with Jillas and cares for the baby, while Lina and Gourry set off to whatever they could become.

=== Season 4: Revolution (2008) ===
- Opening theme: Plenty of Grit by Megumi Hayashibara.
- Ending theme: Revolution by Megumi Hayashibara.

No. overall	No. in season	Title	Original release date	English air date
79	1	"AMAZING - The Astonishing Dragon Slave!?"; Transliteration: "AMAZING Kyōgaku no Doragu Sureibu!?" (Japanese: AMAZING 驚愕のドラグスレイブ!?)	July 2, 2008	September 6, 2010
Lina is arrested by Wizer Frayon for the supposed crime of being herself. In fighting back against a special magic tank, Lina and the gang discover a small stuffed animal who can use the Dragu Slave.
80	2	"BECAUSE - You're Lina Inverse, That's Why!"; Transliteration: "BECAUSE Sore wa Rina Inbāsu dakara!" (Japanese: BECAUSE それはリナ=インバースだから!)	July 9, 2008	TBA
In order to clear her name, Lina promises Wizer that she'll capture the stuffed animal. She and Gourry track him down to discover that his name is Pokota, the magic tanks belong to him, and he has a replica of the Sword of Light.
81	3	"CHASE - The Endless Pursuit!"; Transliteration: "CHASE Owari Naki Tsuisō" (Japanese: CHASE 終わりなき追走)	July 16, 2008	TBA
Rich ladies' pets are going missing, and Wizer is blaming Lina again. Lina then vows to find the true petnapper in order to clear her name.
82	4	"DRIFTER - Who's Chasing Whom?!"; Transliteration: "DRIFTER Ou ka Owareru ka" (Japanese: DRIFTER 追うか追われるか)	July 23, 2008	TBA
While Lina and Gourry go off to think of a plan to catch Pokota, Amelia and Zelgadis find him and aid in his plans to destroy magic tanks. They end up destroying a fake tank made by Lina and Gourry, and Pokota leaves.
83	5	"ETERNAL - The Forever-Sleeping Forest!"; Transliteration: "ETERNAL Yūkyū ni Nemureshi Mori" (Japanese: ETERNAL 悠久に眠れし森)	July 30, 2008	TBA
Lina and the gang chase Pokota to Taforashia, a kingdom that had been struck down by a plague. In learning that Pokota is Taforashia's prince, they meet his friend Duclis, a Ruvinagald Marquess Gioconda, and Xellos, who is working for her.
84	6	"FALL ON - Strange Festival! Bizarre Festival? Push That Ball Up!"; Transliteration: "FALL ON Kisai! Chinsai? Ano Tama o Oshiagero!" (Japanese: FALL ON 奇祭! 珍祭? あの玉を押しあげろ!)	August 6, 2008	TBA
The crew gets to Rolly-Rolly Village, who is holding a festival to roll a ball up to a mountain. In order to defeat Pokota, Lina creates a golem to combat him.
85	7	"GORGEOUS - The Targeted Luxury Liner?"; Transliteration: "GORGEOUS Nerawareta Gōka Kyakusen!?" (Japanese: GORGEOUS 狙われた豪華客船!?)	August 13, 2008	TBA
Lina and the gang board a cruise ship to Ruvinagald Kingdom to confront Gioconda. After several homicide attempts made at them, the gang confronts Zuuma, an assassin who Gioconda hired to kill Lina and take Pokota's Sword of Light.
86	8	"HURRY UP! Run Through! No, Don't?"; Transliteration: "HURRY UP Tsukkome! Iya, Tsukkomu na?" (Japanese: HURRY UP つっこめっ! いや, つっこむな?)	August 20, 2008	TBA
Hoping to go to Ruvinagald, Lina and company confront Wizer and Xellos in a coliseum-like building in which several traps are laid. Eventually, Xellos forces Lina to come with them, but not before Lina sneaks Pokota out.
87	9	"INSIDER! The One Who Knows The Truth!"; Transliteration: "INSIDER shinjitsu o shiru mono!" (Japanese: INSIDER 真実を知るもの!)	August 27, 2008	TBA
Finally at Ruvinagald, Lina and the gang are met by Ozzel, a maid in service to Red Priest Rezo, who asks them to find the jar containing his soul. They encounter Zuuma again and fight him, Ozzel, and Gioconda. Meanwhile, Pokota faces Duclis.
88	10	"JUDGEMENT - The Silver One Rises Again!"; Transliteration: "JUDGEMENT Yomigaeru shirogane!" (Japanese: JUDGMENT 蘇る白銀!)	September 3, 2008	TBA
Thanks to Wizer, Pokota and Duclis learn that Gioconda interfered with relief aid meant for their kingdom, Taforashia. Defeating Zuuma, Lina and co. trap Gioconda, but she is struck down by Duclis and transformed by her Zanaffar Armor.
89	11	"KEEP OUT - The Demon Beast Looms!"; Transliteration: "KEEP OUT shinobiyoru majū!" (Japanese: KEEP OUT しのびよる魔獣!)	September 10, 2008	TBA
Duclis has created a new Zanaffar, who he asks to destroy kingdoms who didn't help Taforashia. Pokota tries to go off on his own to fight Zanaffar, but Lina convinces him otherwise. They then learn that Zanaffar's next target is Seyruun.
90	12	"LEGACY - Decisive Battle In Seyruun!"; Transliteration: "LEGACY Kessen Seirūn!" (Japanese: LEGACY 決戦セイルーン!)	September 17, 2008	TBA
Returning to Seyruun, Lina and the gang meet Sylphiel and wage an all-out assault on Zanaffar, who only can be hurt by the Sword of Light.
91	13	"MISTY - The Blades Are Brought Down!"; Transliteration: "MISTY furiorosareru yaiba!" (Japanese: MISTY 振り下ろされる刃!)	September 24, 2008	TBA
Lina confronts the real Zanafarr in the final showdown.

=== Season 5: Evolution-R (2009) ===
- Opening theme: Front Breaking by Megumi Hayashibara.
- Ending theme: Sunadokei by Megumi Hayashibara.
- Ending theme 2: Just Begun by Megumi Hayashibara.

No. overall	No. in season	Title	Original release date	English air date
92	1	"NEW COMER? A new adventure begins!" Transliteration: "NEW COMER? Aratanaru Tabidachi!" (Japanese: NEW COMER?新たなる旅立ち!)	January 12, 2009	September 6, 2010
Lina and her friends search for the Hellmaster's jar to bring Rezo back so he can help revive the people from the plague. Meanwhile they run into a woman whose soul was forged into armor.
93	2	"OH MY HEAD! Where did it go?" Transliteration: "OH MY HEAD! Atama wa Doko da?" (Japanese: OH MY HEAD!頭はどこだ?)	January 19, 2009	TBA
Nama leads the crew to a village that has been being harassed by a headless knight named Hans. When they capture him, he offers one of his jars in exchange for them helping him find his missing head.
94	3	"PARTNER! They're sharing a body?" Transliteration: "PARTNER! Futari wa Isshin Dōtai?" (Japanese: PARTNER! 二人は一心同体?)	January 26, 2009	TBA
Amelia and Nama get separated from the crew and Amelia ends up stuck inside of Nama. The two then hear about a dragon from a nearby village and decide to take it on.
95	4	"QUALITY TIME? A loving life?" Transliteration: "QUALITY TIME? Ai aru seikatsu" (Japanese: QUALITY TIME?愛ある生活?)	February 2, 2009	TBA
Kuppi, the fishwoman captured by the pirates, comes to Gourry under the pretext that he is the father of her two children. Madness ensues as Lina fights to get Gourry back.
96	5	"RAIDER! A voice from the darkness!" Transliteration: "RAIDER! Yami kara no koe!" (Japanese: RAIDER! 闇からの声!)	February 9, 2009	TBA
Nama finally leads the gang to ruins where the jar that sealed her soul into the armor lies. Unfortunately, as Xellos notes, this is not the right Hellmaster's Jar, and the Hellmaster's Jar lies in Zuuma's possession.
97	6	"SEEK! Who is the target?" Transliteration: "SEEK! Nerawareru no wa dare da!" (Japanese: SEEK! 狙われるのは誰だ!)	February 16, 2009	TBA
Upon Zuuma's demand, Lina and company go to Vezendi and find out that a merchant named Radock has the Hellmaster's Jar. As a target of Zuuma, he hires them to be his bodyguards, but they are attacked by two monsters, Gduza and Dugld.
98	7	"TOWN SCAPE because it's manmade!" Transliteration: "TOWN SCAPE Hito ni tsukurareta mono yue ni" (Japanese: TOWN SCAPE 人に作られたモノゆえに)	February 23, 2009	TBA
In order to find out more information on the Hellmaster's Jar, Lina, Gourry and Pokota follow Ozzel, encountering Zuuma along the way. Meanwhile, Amelia and Zelgadis are attacked by Gduza and Dugld while guarding Radock.
99	8	"UNCOVER, the darkness unveiled!" Transliteration: "UNCOVER Abakareru yami!" (Japanese: UNCOVER 暴かれる闇!)	March 2, 2009	TBA
In order to lure Zuuma out, Radock, Abel, and Lina's crew go on a business trip. While they stop, Zuuma, Gduza, Duguld, and an army of monsters attack. Lina and company learn that Radock was Zuuma all along, but he is killed by Xellos.
100	9	"VOICE, what's inside the jar?" Transliteration: "VOICE Tsubo no nakami wa nan desu ka?" (Japanese: VOICE 壺の中身は何ですか?)	March 9, 2009	TBA
Having obtained the Hellmaster's Jar, Lina and the party hear Rezo's voice inside. Following random instructions, they go through several tasks before finding Ozzel and the jar stolen by some bandits.
101	10	"WISDOM, Wishing for times lost forever!" Transliteration: "WISDOM Kaeranu toki o motomete!" (Japanese: Wisdom 帰らぬ時を求めて!)	March 16, 2009	TBA
Zelgadis steals the Hellmaster's Jar and reveals the true nature of Rezo. Rezo confirms this for Pokota and tells him that in order to save Taforashia, he must inhabit Pokota's body. Meanwhile, Zelgadis learns the truth about chimeras.
102	11	"XENO, the master of resurrection!" Transliteration: "XENO Fukkatsu no daishō" (Japanese: Xeno 復活の代償)	March 23, 2009	TBA
Accepting the fact that Rezo must have his body, Pokota steals the Hellmaster's Jar and goes with Ozzel to Taforashia with Lina and the gang in pursuit. Xellos attempts to stop the ceremony, while Ozzel struggles with her own feelings.
103	12	"YESTERDAYS MEMORY: The regained days" Transliteration: "YESTERDAYS MEMORY Torimodoshita hibi" (Japanese: YESTERDAYS MEMORY 取り戻した日々)	March 30, 2009	TBA
Having finally been revived, Rezo the Red Priest awakens the people of Taforashia and cures the disease. However, Lina, Gourry and Xellos question Rezo and find out that his soul is still host to a fragment of Shabranigdo, the Dark Lord.
104	13	"ZERO HOUR! Those heading to destruction!" Transliteration: "ZERO HOUR Horobiyuku mono!" (Japanese: ZERO HOUR 滅びゆくもの!)	April 6, 2009	TBA
Shabranigdo has been revived, and Lina and the gang struggle to hold out against him. Pokota holds him off while Lina readies the Giga Slave, the spell she used to defeat him before.
