= List of NNN and NNS affiliates =

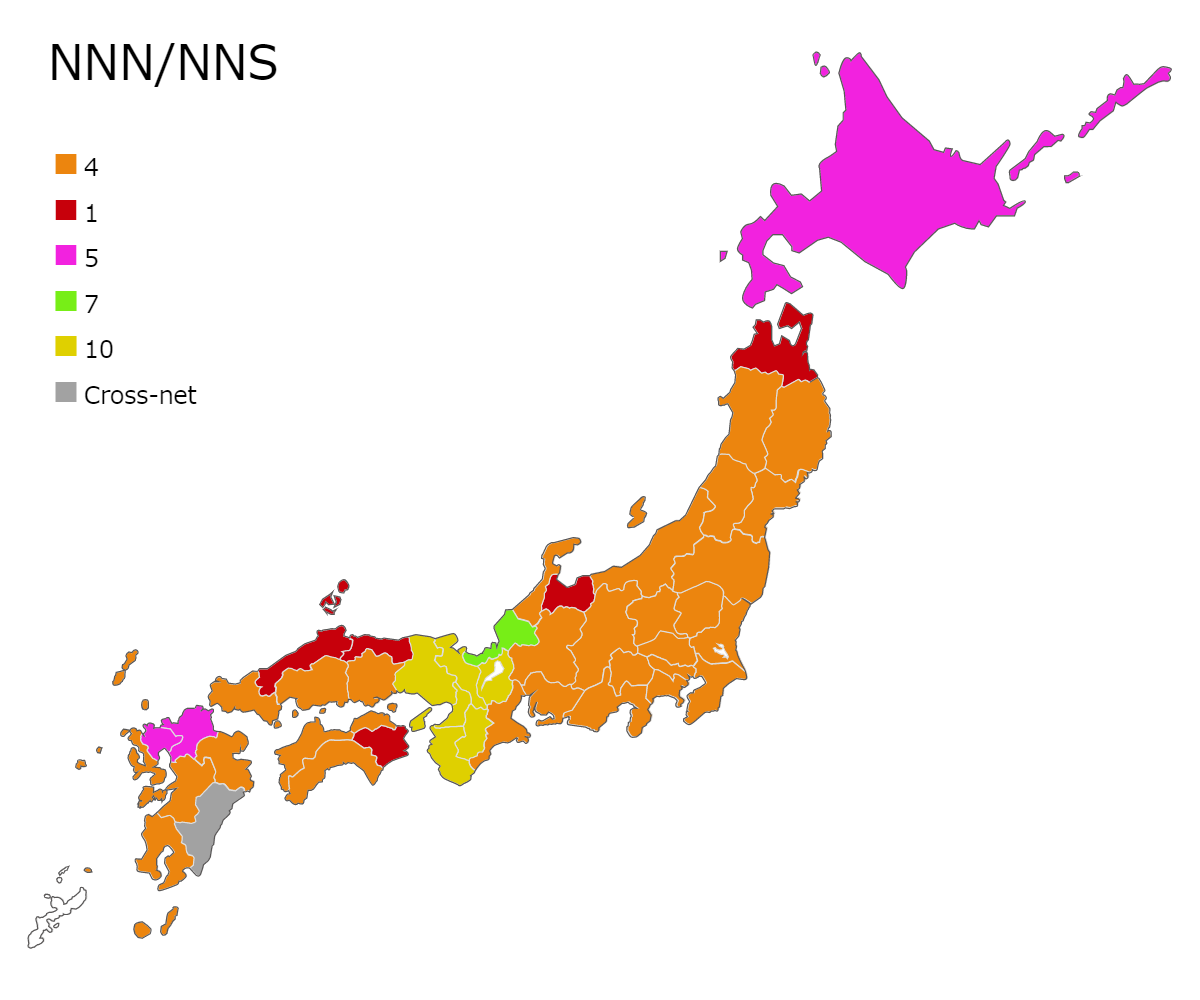
LCN assignments of NNN and NNS affiliates

The Nippon News Network (NNN) and Nippon Television Network System (NNS) are Japanese commercial television networks organised by Nippon Television (NTV) in Tokyo, which is owned by The Yomiuri Shimbun Holdings. NNN provides national news and current affairs programming to its regional affiliates, while NNS feeds entertainment and other non-news programmes. NNN and NNS are made up of 30 affiliates, including three stations that are double- or triple-affiliated with rival networks.

NNN was founded on 1 April 1966, while NNS was founded on 14 June 1972.

Stations are listed mostly in Japanese order of prefectures which is mirrored in ISO 3166-2:JP, with exceptions for the Kantō region, Aichi-Gifu-Mie, Kansai region (except Mie), Tottori-Shimane and Okayama-Kagawa, which form single wide broadcasting markets respectively.

== Affiliate stations ==
Broadcasting area(s)		Station			LCN	Start date of broadcast	Date of affiliation		Note(s)
Prefecture	Region	On air branding	Abbr.	Call sign	LCN	Start date of broadcast	NNN	NNS	Note(s)
Hokkaidō		Sapporo TV	STV	JOKX-DTV	5	1 April 1959	1 April 1966	14 June 1972	Core station
Aomori	Tōhoku	Aomori Broadcasting	RAB	JOGR-DTV	1	1 October 1959	1 April 1966	14 June 1972	
Iwate	Tōhoku	TV Iwate	TVI	JOII-DTV	4	1 December 1969	1 December 1969	10 September 1974	
Miyagi	Tōhoku	Miyagi TV	MMT (Note: Until August 31, 1975, abbreviated as MTB and September 1, 1975 to September 30, 1985, abbreviated as MM34.)	JOMM-DTV	4	1 October 1970	1 October 1970	10 September 1974	Core station
Akita	Tōhoku	Akita Broadcasting	ABS	JOTR-DTV	4	1 April 1960	1 April 1966	14 June 1972	
Yamagata	Tōhoku	Yamagata Broadcasting	YBC	JOEF-DTV	4	1 April 1960	1 April 1966	14 June 1972	
Fukushima	Tōhoku	Fukushima Central TV	FCT	JOVI-DTV	4	1 April 1970	1 October 1971	10 September 1974	
Kantō region		Nippon TV	NTV	JOAX-DTV	4	28 August 1953	1 April 1966	14 June 1972	Eastern flagship station; core station
Niigata	Chūbu	TV Niigata	TeNY (Note: Until December 31, 1997, abbreviated as TNN)	JOPI-DTV	4	1 April 1981	1 April 1981	1 April 1981	
Toyama	Chūbu	Kitanihon Broadcasting	KNB	JOLR-DTV	1	1 April 1959	1 April 1966	14 June 1972	
Ishikawa	Chūbu	TV Kanazawa	KTK	JOWX-DTV	4	1 April 1990	1 April 1990	1 April 1990	
Fukui	Chūbu	Fukui Broadcasting	FBC	JOPR-DTV	7	1 June 1960	1 April 1966	14 June 1972	Primary affiliate; also affiliated with ANN since 1989
Yamanashi	Chūbu	Yamanashi Broadcasting	YBS	JOJF-DTV	4	20 December 1959	1 April 1966	14 June 1972	
Nagano	Chūbu	TV Shinshu	TSB	JONI-DTV	4	1 October 1980	1 October 1980	1 April 1981	
Shizuoka	Chūbu	Shizuoka Daiichi TV	SDT	JOSX-DTV	4	1 July 1979	1 July 1979	1 July 1979	
Aichi and Gifu	Chūbu	Chukyo TV	CTV	JOCH-DTV	4	1 April 1969	1 April 1973	1 April 1973	Core station
Mie	Kansai	Chukyo TV	CTV	JOCH-DTV	4	1 April 1969	1 April 1973	1 April 1973	Core station
Kansai region (except Mie)		Yomiuri TV	ytv	JOIX-DTV	10	28 August 1958	1 April 1966	14 June 1972	Western flagship station; core station
Tottori and Shimane	Chūgoku	Nihonkai TV	NKT	JOJX-DTV	1	3 March 1959	1 April 1966	14 June 1972	
Hiroshima	Chūgoku	Hiroshima TV	HTV	JONX-DTV	4	1 September 1962	1 April 1966	14 June 1972	Core station
Yamaguchi	Chūgoku	Yamaguchi Broadcasting	KRY	JOPF-DTV	4	1 October 1959	1 April 1966	14 June 1972	
Okayama	Chūgoku	Nishinippon Broadcasting	RNC	JOKF-DTV	4	1 July 1958	1 April 1966	14 June 1972	
Kagawa	Shikoku	Nishinippon Broadcasting	RNC	JOKF-DTV	4	1 July 1958	1 April 1966	14 June 1972	
Tokushima	Shikoku	Shikoku Broadcasting	JRT	JOJR-DTV	1	1 April 1959	1 April 1966	14 June 1972	
Ehime	Shikoku	Nankai Broadcasting	RNB	JOAF-DTV	4	1 December 1958	1 April 1966	14 June 1972	
Kōchi	Shikoku	Kochi Broadcasting	RKC	JOZR-DTV	4	1 April 1959	1 April 1966	14 June 1972	
Fukuoka	Kyūshū	Fukuoka Broadcasting	FBS	JOFH-DTV	5	1 April 1969	1 April 1969	14 June 1972	Core station
Nagasaki	Kyūshū	Nagasaki International TV	NIB	JOXH-DTV	4	1 April 1991	1 April 1991	1 April 1991	
Kumamoto	Kyūshū	Kumamoto Kenmin TV	KKT	JOQI-DTV	4	1 April 1982	1 April 1982	1 April 1982	
Ōita	Kyūshū	TV Oita	TOS	JOOI-DTV	4	1 April 1970	1 April 1970	14 June 1972	Also affiliated with FNN/FNS
Miyazaki	Kyūshū	TV Miyazaki	UMK	JODI-DTV	3	1 April 1970	1 April 1979	(none)	Tertiary affiliate of NNN; not affiliated for non-news programming (NNS); also affiliated with FNN/FNS and ANN
Kagoshima	Kyūshū	Kagoshima Yomiuri TV	KYT	JOUI-DTV	4	1 April 1994	1 April 1994	1 April 1994	

== Areas without an NNN/NNS station ==
Prefecture	Region	Station(s) from neighbouring prefecture	News gathering
Saga	Kyushu	FBS (Fukuoka)	FBS (Fukuoka)
Miyazaki	Kyushu	For NNS programming on cable providers: KKT (Kumamoto), KYT (Kagoshima) For NNN programming: UMK (Miyazaki), KKT (Kumamoto), KYT (Kagoshima)	UMK (Miyazaki)
Okinawa	Ryukyu	N/A (Note: For Okinawa, cable operators Okinawa Cable Network (for mainland Okinawa since August 2019) and Miyako Television (for the city of Miyakojima in Miyako Island since October 2022) currently relay live programming from KYT in Kagoshima, while Okinawa Television and Ryukyu Broadcasting are airing select non-news programming from NTV.)	Nippon TV Naha Bureau

== Former affiliate stations ==
Single asterisk (*) indicates former primary affiliate

Broadcasting area(s)		Station			Ch.	Years of affiliation	Current affiliation	Current NNN/NNS affiliate	Note(s)
Prefecture	Region	On air branding	Abbr.	Call sign	Ch.	Years of affiliation	Current affiliation	Current NNN/NNS affiliate	Note(s)
Miyagi	Tōhoku	Sendai Television	OX	JOOX-TV	12	1966–1970	FNN/FNS	MMT	(Note: Established as an affiliate of Nippon Television, Nihon Educational Television and Fuji TV, joining their respective general and news networks later on. On 1 October 1970, Miyagi Television took NNN's programming from OX, causing it to become a primary affiliate of Fuji TV. TV Asahi programming moved to KHB when it launched in 1975.)
Fukushima	Tōhoku	Fukushima TV*	FTV	JOPX-TV	11	1966–1971	FNN/FNS	FCT	(Note: Initially not affiliated with the 4 main networks between 1 April 1963, to 31 March 1966, FTV then joined NNN as one of its founding members on its founding. Nippon TV programming moved to Fukushima Central Television when it opened on 1 April 1970.)
Niigata	Chūbu	Niigata Sogo Television	NST	JONH-TV	35	1968–1981	FNN/FNS	TeNY	(Note: Initially a triple affiliate of NET (TV Asahi), Fuji TV and Nippon Television. It was affiliated to the network until 31 March 1981, when TNN (now TeNY) started broadcasting, taking over NTV's schedule from NST, causing it to become a primary affiliate of Fuji TV. TV Asahi programming remained on the station until 30 September 1983, when NT21 (now branded as UX) launched.)
Shizuoka	Chūbu	Shizuoka Prefectural TV	SKT	JOSI-TV	33	1978–1979 (secondary)	ANN	SDT	(Note: Shizuoka Prefectural Television (静岡けんみんテレビ, SKT) was a secondary affiliate of NNN/NNS from 1 July 1978, to 30 June 1979. The following day, Shizuoka Daiichi Television took over NNN's programming, allowing SKT to become a full-time ANN affiliate. Since 1993, the latter station is branded as Shizuoka Asahi Television.)
Aichi and Gifu	Chūbu	Nagoya TV*	NBN	JOLX-TV	11	1966–1973	ANN	CTV	(Note: Was affiliated to NTV prior to NNN's creation. Switched to ANN full-time on 1 April 1973, owing to a conflict with Chukyo Television Broadcasting.)
Mie	Kansai	Nagoya TV*	NBN	JOLX-TV	11	1966–1973	ANN	CTV	(Note: Was affiliated to NTV prior to NNN's creation. Switched to ANN full-time on 1 April 1973, owing to a conflict with Chukyo Television Broadcasting.)
Nagasaki	Kyūshū	TV Nagasaki	KTN	JOWH-TV	37	1969–1990 (secondary)	FNN/FNS	NIB	(Note: Primary FNN/FNS affiliate, secondarily affiliated with NNN from 1 April 1969, to 30 September 1990. NNN/NNS programming moved to NIB when it started broadcasting.)
Kumamoto	Kyūshū	TV Kumamoto	TKU	JOZH-TV	34	1969–1982 (secondary)	FNN/FNS	KKT	(Note: Primary FNN/FNS affiliate, secondarily affiliated to NNN from 1 April 1969, to 31 March 1982. NNN programming moved to the newly created KKT.)
Kagoshima	Kyūshū	Kagoshima TV	KTS	JOKH-TV	38	1969–1994 (secondary)	FNN/FNS	KYT	(Note: Primary FNN/FNS affiliate, secondarily affiliated to NNN from 1 April 1969, to 31 March 1994. NNN programming moved to the newly created KYT.)

== Affiliates that initially planned to join but later withdrew ==
Broadcasting area(s)		Station			Ch.	Current affiliation	Current NNN/NNS affiliate	Note(s)
Prefecture	Region	On air branding	Abbr.	Call sign	Ch.	Current affiliation	Current NNN/NNS affiliate	Note(s)
Tottori and Shimane	Chūgoku	TSK	TSK	JOMI-TV	38	FNN/FNS	NKT	Since the San'in Chuo Shimpo (Shimane Shimbun at the time of its opening) was deeply involved in the opening of TSK, it had a close relationship with the Yomiuri Shimbun, at first the newspaper hoped to open a station as a Nippon Television affiliate, but it was already Nihonkai Television (at that time (1970 to 1973) exclusively in Tottori prefecture) that was carrying Nippon TV programs, so it was opened as a Fuji TV affiliated full net in consideration of mutual entry with Tottori prefecture in the future (in 1973).
Kumamoto	Kyūshū	TV Kumamoto	TKU	JOZH-TV	34	FNN/FNS	KKT	Observer affiliate. However, in response to some news programs, materials were also sent out and paid for the net share.
Kagoshima	Kyūshū	Kagoshima Broadcasting	KKB	JOTI-TV	32	ANN	KYT	As a result of the unification adjustment and discussion by three flagship stations in Tokyo (Nippon Television, Fuji Television, and TV Asahi), it was decided that the third commercial broadcasting station in Kumamoto Prefecture would be an affiliate of Nippon Television (Kumamoto Kenmin Television), whilst the third station in Kagoshima Prefecture would be an affiliate of TV Asahi.
Okinawa	Ryukyu	Okinawa Television	OTV	JOOF-TV	8	FNN/FNS	N/A	Since Okinawa was under the rule of the United States at the time of the preparatory stage for the opening of the station, NTV presented a condition that it would allow the purchase of the program but not cooperate with capital participation (before the launch of NNN). Even after the establishment of NNN/NNS, the official membership as a dual FNN/NNN affiliate was not achieved.
