= Kagoshima Television Station =

JOKH-DTV
- Logo used since 2016

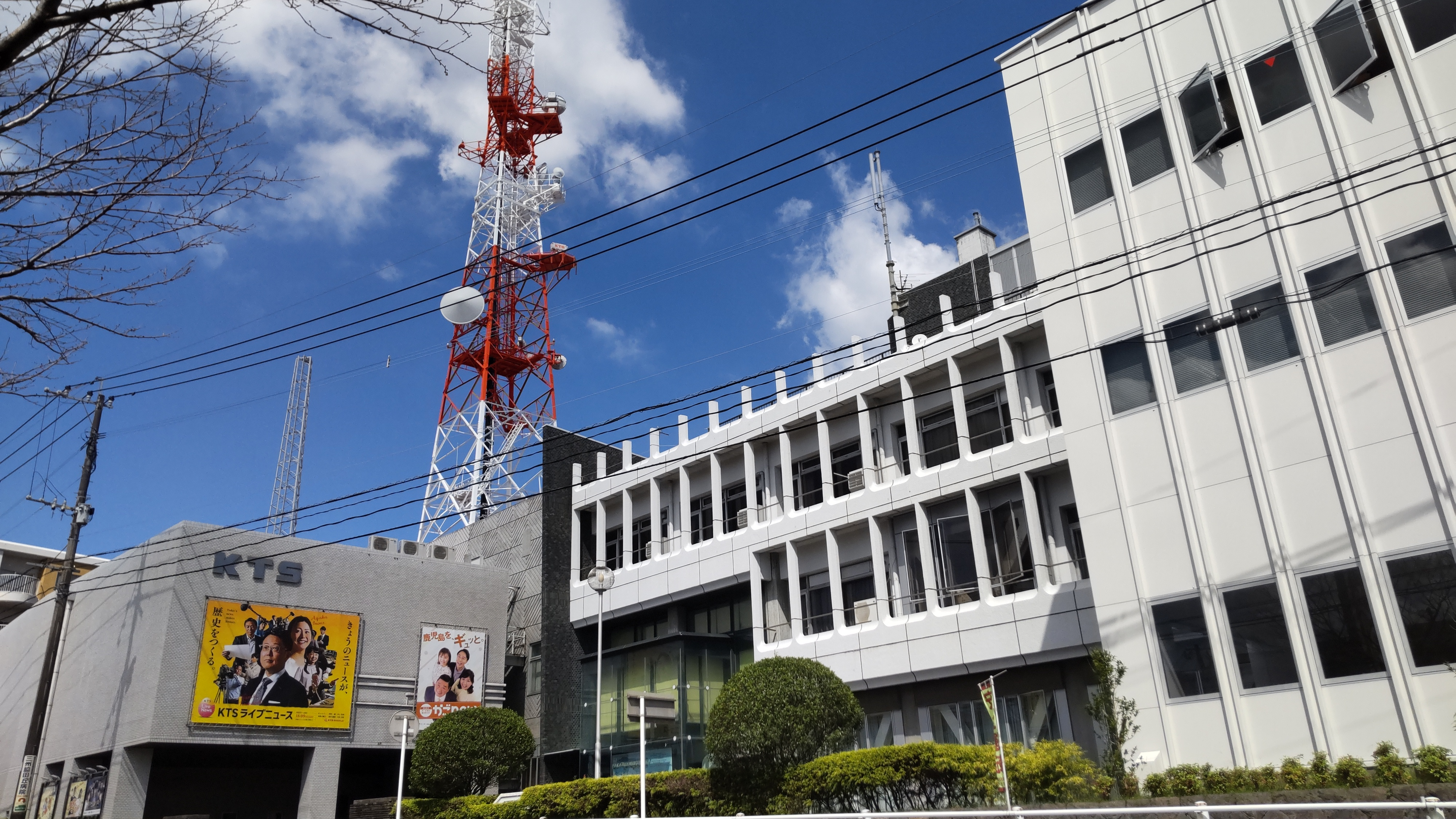
- Headquarters in Murasakibaru, Kagoshima
- Kagoshima Prefecture; Japan
- City: Kagoshima
- Channels: Digital: 42 (UHF); Virtual: 8
- Branding: Kagoshima Television; KTS

Programming
- Language: Japanese
- Affiliations: Fuji News Network and Fuji Network System

Ownership
- Owner: Kagoshima Television Station Co., Ltd.

History
- First air date: 1 April 1969
- Former call signs: JOKH-TV (1969–2011)
- Former channel number: Analog: 38 (UHF, 1969–2011)
- Former affiliations: NET/ANN (secondary; 1969–1991); NTV/NNN/NNS (secondary; 1969–1994)
- Call sign meaning: Kagoshima

Technical information
- Licensing authority: MIC

Links
- Website: www.kts-tv.co.jp

Corporate information
- Native name: 鹿児島テレビ放送株式会社
- Romanized name: Kagoshima Terebi Hōsō Kabushiki-gaisha
- Type: Private
- Industry: Television broadcasting
- Founded: 12 March 1968; 58 years ago
- Key people: Toshiro Maeda (president and CEO)
- Subsidiaries: KCR; KTS Pro Staff; Kagoshima City FM Co., Ltd. (28.87%)

Kagoshima Television Station Co., Ltd. (鹿児島テレビ放送, Kagoshima Terebi Hōsō), also known as KTS, is a television broadcaster headquartered in Kagoshima, Kagoshima Prefecture, Japan. It is affiliated with Fuji News Network (FNN) and Fuji Network System (FNS).

Kagoshima Television is the second commercial television station in Kagoshima Prefecture, and started broadcasting in 1969. KTS was a triple affiliate of FNN, NNN and ANN when it began broadcasting. On 1 December 2006, KTS began digital terrestrial television broadcasting.

== History ==
In March 1963, the Ministry of Posts and Telecommunications released its second television frequency allocation plan, opening the UHF band for television broadcasting, making viable the installation of a second television station in mid-sized prefectures, including Kagoshima. At the time, seven bids requested the license to operate the station. With the support of the prefectural government, these bids were merged into one, forming the Kagoshima Television Station in October 1967, and, alongside other stations of the first tranche of UHF licenses, received its broadcasting license on November 1. On March 11, 1968, KTS held its founding general assembly and was registered the following day. On August 28, the opening ceremony of its headquarters was held. Supported by Mitsubishi Estate, the building had four floors (three above ground and one below) and had a total area of 3,427 square meters. In February 1969, construction work for the headquarters was completed, and on February 22, test broadcasts began.

At 8:30am on April 1, 1969, the station started broadcasting, alongside other FNN stations in Kyushu (TKU, KTN and STS) and NNN affiliate FBS in Fukuoka. At launch time, it joined Fuji TV, NTV and NET TV, joining its three networks. Proportionally, each network contributed with one third of the networked programming. Per a Video Research study in December 1969, the Wednesday night ratings were comparable to MBC, and led with its evening programs, compared to other stations. In 1970 and 1971, KTS installed ten relay stations, including Makurazaki and Osumi, in order to enable coverage to 98% of the prefecture (excluding remote islands). In 1974, it set up a relay station at Tanegashima, beginning its expansion plan to remote island areas. On January 28, 1977, it installed a relay station at Nase, Amami Ōshima, becoming the first private TV station to do so. A special program from Nase was broadcast the following day. On March 7, 1980, with the installation of the Yoron transmitter, KTS finally covered the whole prefecture.

In 1971, KTS gradually started producing its own programs in color, and in January 1973, did it full-time. On September 1, 1979, it changed the color of its logo (it was orange, but became red), and, in the same month, opened a new, 267 square-meter studio. In November 1981, it converted Studio 2 into a news studio in order to produce long news programs.

On October 1, 1982, with the opening of Kagoshima Broadcasting (KKB), the station withdrew from ANN, simply becoming a dual Fuji TV-NTV affiliate. In 1983, ahead of its fifteenth anniversary, it achieved the Triple Crown in ratings for the first time in its history. In 1989, for its twentieth anniversary, it produced The Life of Yaeko Enatsu, a drama series achieving 43.4% share locally, and airing nationwide on NTV. By then, it had achieved the Triple Crown for six years in a row. In 1991, it signed a sister station agreement with WSVN from Miami, a sister city of Kagoshima. Further agreements were signed in 1993 with Shanghai Television and Hong Kong's TVB.

With the launch of Kagoshima Yomiuri Television on April 1, 1994, the station left NNN and NNS and became a full-time Fuji TV affiliate. On July 6, 1995, it announced a three-floor expansion of its building, with a total area of 600 square meters, and was finished on December 12. The rest of the building was refurbished in 2000. In 2003, the station won the Triple Crown for the first time since the launch of KYT.。

Digital terrestrial broadcasts started on December 1, 2006, in 2008, a transmitter was installed at Amami Ōshima. The analog signal was switched off on July 24, 2011. In 2016, the KTS Annex in its headquarters was built, used as an office space for its subsidiary.

== Programming ==
Local news production only started on October 1, 1969, broadcasting a five-minute bulletin at 6:55pm. On May 9, 1970, a full local news service, Zoom In Kagoshima (ズームインかごしま) started. On May 7, 1972, it added Sunday Eleven (サンデーイレブン) on Sunday mornings. It was replaced by KTS Anata no Kagoshima (KTSあなたのかごしま) in October 1975. In April 1980, it moved to weekday mornings, airing for 45 minutes. In 1987, it aired its 2000th edition.

On April 1, 1982, the station started airing KTS TV Evening News (KTSテレビ夕刊), becoming its main evening bulletin This was replaced in 1985 by KTS Super Time NEWS&SPORTS, which was aligned with the network's Super Time brand. During the local floodings on August 6, 1993, the station produced news specials throughout the day.

KTS produced The Five Great Stone Bridges of Kotsu River in 1974, about the building of five stone bridges during the Edo period over the Kotsu river in Kagoshima City: Tamagawa Bridge, Shin-Kami Bridge, Nishida Bridge, Koryo Bridge and Takeno Bridge. Of those bridges, only Shin-Kami and Takano were destroyed in the 1986 floods. By 1993, the documentary had become valuable audiovisual material. In 1986, it produced Report of Kodakarajima's 22 Islets, which won the Kyushu-Okinawa Award of the Japanese Association of Commercial Broadcasters (JBA). KTS decided to serialize it based on constant changes to one of its islets. Warning of Sakurajima, produced in 1987, won the Best Program from the Report Division Award from JBA, and a sequel was produced in 1989.

The station also assisted the national Fuji TV network in providing local infrastructure for its national programs when they visited the prefecture. During the joint affiliation period with NNN, three editions of the NTV variety show 11PM were broadcast from Kagoshima on April 25, 1974, September 18, 1975 and April 20, 1978. On March 21, 1978, the Fuji TV news program Hiroide Ogawa was broadcast locally. The network's morning show Mezamashi TV was broadcast from several points of the prefecture at least three times in its history: in Yoron on August 12, 1994, Amami Ōshima on April 18, 2003 and Yakushima on April 24, 2006.
