= Dennō Senshi Porygon =

- Pokémon episode
- One of the scenes known to trigger epileptic seizures
- Episode no.: Season 1 Episode 38
- Directed by: Kiyotaka Itani
- Written by: Junki Takegami
- Production code: 138
- Original air date: December 16, 1997

Episode chronology
← Previous "Ditto's Mysterious Mansion"	Next → "Pikachu's Goodbye"

"Dennō Senshi Porygon" (Japanese: でんのうせんしポリゴン, Hepburn: Dennō Senshi Porigon, "Computer Warrior Porygon") is the 38th episode of the Pokémon anime's first season. During its sole broadcast in Japan on December 16, 1997, multiple scenes with flashing lights induced photosensitive epileptic seizures in children across the country. Over 600 people, mostly children, were taken to hospitals; many others experienced milder symptoms that did not necessitate hospitalization. Furthermore, it is estimated that the total number of children who were affected in some way, even if they were not taken to the hospital, reached several thousand. The incident is referred to in Japan as the "Pokémon Shock" (ポケモンショック, Pokemon Shokku).

The episode was written by Junki Takegami and directed by Kiyotaka Itani, and was broadcast on TV Tokyo. In the episode, Ash and his friends find that there is something wrong with the Poké Ball transmitting device at the local Pokémon Center. To find out what is wrong, they must go inside the machine. Towards the end of the episode, Pikachu stops a wave of missiles with an attack, resulting in an explosion that is depicted by rapid flashing lights that fill the screen.

After the incident, the Pokémon anime went into a four-month hiatus. The episode was pulled from rotation and was never aired in any other country. The incident complicated plans for an American localization of the series, and resulted in new broadcasting standards in Japan to ensure that future incidents would be avoided.

== Plot ==
Ash, Misty and Brock make their way to the nearest Pokémon Center to heal Pikachu's exhaustion, where they discover that the Poké Ball transmitting device is malfunctioning. On Nurse Joy's request, they go to Professor Akihabara, a scientist who created the Poké Ball transfer system. He tells them that Team Rocket stole his prototype Porygon, a digital Pokémon that can exist in cyberspace, and is using it to steal trainers' Pokémon from inside the computer system.

Akihabara sends Ash, Misty, Brock, Pikachu and his second Porygon into the cyberspace system using his Dimension Transporter. They realize that Team Rocket has set up a blockade that stops Poké Balls from completing their journey through the network. In an ensuing battle, Porygon is able to defeat Team Rocket's Porygon; unfortunately, Nurse Joy, monitoring the situation and unaware that Ash and the others are inside, approves the use of an antivirus program to resolve the problem.

The program manifests as cyber missiles and momentarily incapacitates Team Rocket before they are rescued by Porygon. As Porygon flees with everyone hanging on to its back, more missiles are fired at the group. Pikachu uses a Thunderbolt attack on the missiles, causing a large explosion. Two of the missiles enter the portal, completely destroying Akihabara's house and the Dimension Transporter, though everyone escapes safely.

Team Rocket thanks Ash and his friends for rescuing them before fleeing, after which Ash returns to Nurse Joy to finally request for Pikachu to be healed.

== Broadcast ==
"Dennō Senshi Porygon" had its sole broadcast in Japan on Tuesday, December 16, 1997, at 6:30 p.m. Japan Standard Time (09:30 UTC). It held the highest ratings for its time slot, and was watched by approximately 4.6 million households.

== Incident ==
A slowed-down version of the effect that caused seizures among the viewers of the episode

Twenty minutes into the episode, Pikachu stops missiles with his Thunderbolt attack, resulting in an explosion that rapidly flashes red and blue lights. The exact scene that triggered the seizures aired at 6:51:34 p.m., towards the end of the episode. It was broadcast on 37 TV stations that Tuesday night.

Although there were similar parts in the episode with red and blue flashes, two anime techniques, called paka-paka (Note: In anime, this technique uses different-colored lights flashing alternatively to cause a sense of tension.) and "flash", (Note: This technique emits a strong beam of light.) made the scene particularly intense. There were multiple sequences of bright strobe lights, alternating between red and blue, or red and white-blue. The episode's film was played at 24 frames per second, alternating colors every frame in these sequences, meaning that each color flickered at 12 Hz. These sequences ranged from 0.5 to 4 seconds in duration, with the problematic sequence running for 4 seconds.

After viewing the problematic sequence, some viewers experienced blurred vision, headaches, dizziness and nausea. Some suffered seizures, blindness, convulsions and unconsciousness. The Japanese press referred to this incident as "Pokémon Shock" (ポケモンショック, Pokemon Shokku). The Pokémon anime's General Director Kunihiko Yuyama said "We used red and blue flashing for all the explosions inside our cyber space, because we wanted to give the explosions an electrical feel, that set them apart from the explosions seen elsewhere in the show. And so that's why we used those colors so much in this episode."

=== Affected people ===
According to a survey by Japan's Fire and Disaster Management Agency, 685 viewers—310 male and 375 female—were taken to hospitals by ambulances, although many recovered from their symptoms on their way. Of these patients, 208 were admitted to hospitals, including three who were admitted while unconscious. Two patients remained in hospital for over two weeks.

There was a higher incidence in the 11- to 15-year-old demographic, with over 90% of the affected being from middle and high school age ranges; the oldest victim was a 58-year-old from Kanagawa Prefecture. TV Tokyo had a limited terrestrial coverage area, but there were some victims from outside of the network's range who received one of its stations either by terrestrial or cable overspill who were affected. Although approximately 1 in 5000 people are susceptible to these types of seizures, the number of people affected by the Pokémon episode was unprecedented.

According to a follow-up survey conducted in Saitama Prefecture, approximately 1 in 20 children had symptoms, such as headaches and dizziness. According to a report published by the Japanese Ministry of Health and Welfare, 10.4% of viewers experienced some kind of symptoms. Twelve thousand children who were not sent to hospitals reported mild symptoms of illness; however, their symptoms more closely resembled mass hysteria than a seizure. A study following 103 patients over three years after the event found that only 22% were reported to have had seizures after the incident. 15 of these patients were determined to have had visually induced seizures, while 56% of the patients who did have more seizures following the incident also had epilepsy. The three-year study of 103 surveyed patients also found that only 25 (24%) of them were determined to have had seizures before the incident took place.

==== By prefecture ====
The following is a breakdown of the number of people taken to hospital in each prefecture, totaling to 685.

Prefecture	Number of hospitalized cases
Hokkaido	38
Aomori	1
Iwate	0
Miyagi	0
Akita	0
Yamagata	0
Fukushima	2
Ibaraki	26
Tochigi	18
Gunma	18
Saitama	70
Chiba	45
Tokyo	74
Kanagawa	76
Niigata	0
Nagano	7
Yamanashi	6
Toyama	0
Ishikawa	0
Fukui	0
Shizuoka	12
Aichi	60
Gifu	10
Mie	7
Osaka	76
Shiga	0
Kyoto	29
Hyogo	5
Nara	2
Wakayama	0
Tottori	0
Shimane	1
Hiroshima	0
Yamaguchi	11
Okayama	18
Kagawa	10
Tokushima	1
Ehime	1
Kochi	0
Fukuoka	45
Saga	10
Nagasaki	5
Kumamoto	0
Oita	1
Miyazaki	0
Kagoshima	0
Okinawa	0
Total	685

== Aftermath ==
=== Immediate response ===
More than three hours after the controversial scene was broadcast, NHK General TV became the first channel to report on the seizures at 9:59pm that evening during a news bulletin, followed by FNN's News JAPAN later that evening. The topic was heavily discussed on the next day's news programs, but with the footage frozen in order to prevent further damage.

To prevent any similar incidents from occurring, the episode was pulled from rotation, and it has not aired since in any country.

The following day, the television station that had originated the lone broadcast of that episode, TV Tokyo, issued an apology to the Japanese public, suspended the program, and said it would investigate the cause of the seizures. Numerous video retailers across Japan removed the Pokémon anime from their rental shelves in response to the incidents.

Officers from Atago police stations were ordered by Japan's National Police Agency to question the anime's producers about the show's contents and production process.

On the Tokyo Stock Exchange, shares in Nintendo (the company that publishes the games that the anime is based on) fell by 400 yen the following morning to 12,200 yen (almost 3.2%). The president of Nintendo, Hiroshi Yamauchi, said at a press conference the day after the episode had aired that the video game company was not responsible since the original Pokémon game for its Game Boy product was presented in black and white.

=== Effect on the Pokémon anime ===
After the airing of "Dennō Senshi Porygon", the Pokémon anime went into a nearly four-month hiatus.

The episode "Holiday Hi-Jynx", which would have aired the following week, December 23, 1997, was pulled following the incident, and would not air until October 5, 1998. Airing out of order caused confusion to viewers because Ash still had a Charmander instead of Charizard, and Misty did not have Togepi yet, but Starmie and Horsea.

All 37 episodes of Pokémon: Indigo League were rerun on Kids Station in Tokyo leading up to the show's return on April 16, 1998, with airing of "Pikachu's Goodbye" and "The Battling Eevee Brothers". After the hiatus, the time slot changed from Tuesday to Thursday.

Before broadcasting resumed, the special program "Problem Inspection Report on the Pocket Monsters Anime" (アニメ ポケットモンスター問題検証報告, Anime Poketto Monsutā Mondai Kenshō Hōkoku) was shown. Broadcast in Japan on April 16, 1998, host Miyuki Yadama went over the circumstances of the program format and the on-screen advisories at the beginning of animated programs, as well as showing letters and fan drawings sent in by viewers, most of whom were concerned that the incident would lead to the anime being cancelled.

"Dennō Senshi Porygon" itself has never been aired again, in any country. The Pokémon anime has not featured Porygon or its evolutions, Porygon2 and Porygon-Z, in any subsequent episodes despite Pikachu being the one to cause the seizure-inducing strobe effect in one of these scenes. In spite of being absent from the anime, The Pokémon Company continues to feature Porygon in all other aspects of its branding. Porygon remains obtainable in the video game series, is featured in manga adaptations, included in merchandising, and referenced in advertising thereof.

==== By station ====
The series was and still is syndicated to stations outside of the direct coverage area of the six stations of the TX Network. The following table lists the final episode of the Pokémon anime that aired on the station before the hiatus and the title of the program that initially replaced its timeslot.

Region	Station	Network	Last episode aired before suspension	Temporary replacement
Aomori	Aomori Asahi Broadcasting	ANN	37	Class King Yamazaki
Iwate	Iwate Menkoi Television	FNN/FNS	37	unknown
Miyagi	Higashinippon Broadcasting	ANN	36 or 37	Class King Yamazaki
Akita	Akita Television	FNN/FNS	36	Class King Yamazaki
Yamagata	TV-U Yamagata	JNN	36	Manga Nippon Mukashi Banashi
Fukushima	Fukushima Television	FNN	33	Kiteretsu Daihyakka
Niigata	Television Niigata Network	NNN/NNS	34	Bakusō Kyōdai Let's & Go!! and Class King Yamazaki
Nagano	Nagano Broadcasting Systems	FNN/FNS	37	unknown
Yamanashi	UHF Television Yamanashi	JNN	at least 10	Manga Nippon Mukashi Banashi
Toyama	Tulip Television	JNN	36	Class King Yamazaki
Ishikawa	Hokuriku Asahi Broadcasting	ANN	34	Class King Yamazaki
Fukui	Fukui Television Broadcasting	FNN/FNS	at least 10	Class King Yamazaki
Shizuoka	Shizuoka Broadcasting System	JNN	23	Manga Nippon Mukashi Banashi
Gifu	Gifu Broadcasting System	JAITS	37	Class King Yamazaki
Mie	Mie Television	JAITS	34	Class King Yamazaki
Shiga	Biwako Broadcasting	JAITS	36	unknown
Kyoto	Kyoto Broadcasting System	JAITS	33	Class King Yamazaki
Nara	Nara Television	JAITS	37	Class King Yamazaki
Wakayama	Wakayama Telecasting Corporation	JAITS	36	Class King Yamazaki
San'in	Broadcasting System of San-in	JNN	36	Class King Yamazaki
Hiroshima	RCC Broadcasting	JNN	34	Class King Yamazaki
Yamaguchi	Television Yamaguchi Broadcasting Systems	JNN	2	Shōnen Ashibe
Tokushima	Shikoku Broadcasting	NNN/NNS	1	Chibi Maruko-chan
Ehime	Nankai Broadcasting	NNN/NNS	36	Detective Conan and Class King Yamazaki
Kochi	Kochi Broadcasting	JNN	34 or 35	Class King Yamazaki
Saga	Saga Television Station	FNN/FNS	unknown	unknown
Nagasaki	Nagasaki International Television	NNN/NNS	35	Anpanman and Detective Conan
Kumamoto	TV Kumamoto	FNN/FNS	37	Class King Yamazaki
Oita	Television Oita System	NNN/NNS/FNN/FNS	32	Class King Yamazaki
Miyazaki	TV Miyazaki	FNN/FNS/ANN/NNN	12	World Fairy Tale Series
Kagoshima	Kagoshima Broadcasting	ANN	34 or 35	Crayon Shin-chan
Okinawa	Ryukyu Asahi Broadcasting	ANN	20	Class King Yamazaki

==== Effect on localization ====
When the episode aired, Pokémon was only distributed in Japan. Shortly after the incident, speaking to USA Today, Mike Lazzo, vice president of programming for Cartoon Network, reassured parents that American children were unlikely to suffer seizures provoked by cartoons as U.S. networks at the time rarely aired anime, which he argued was substantially different to animation aired on Cartoon Network.

According to former president of Nintendo of America, Minoru Arakawa, he had first raised the possibility of bringing Pokémon to the US market three weeks before this episode aired. The incident occurred while Nintendo of America was in negotiations with ShoPro to localize Pokémon for an American audience. However, Arakawa believed that the coverage of the incident in the US was fairly calm compared to Japan, as the US had previously reported on cases of epilepsy being induced by video games so the concept was already well-known—instead, he argued that it only increased the series' name recognition.

In his book Pokémon Story, Masakazu Kubo of ShoPro notes that initially the incident increased the reluctance to bring the series to the US market, but due to concerns that the entire Pokémon TV show could end up being banned from Japanese TV, instead it was decided that pursuing an American release was essential to repairing the series' reputation in Japan. Kubo argues that once it became accepted in Japan that the incident was due to technical problems with how the show was broadcast rather than the show itself, there was no longer a need for a US release to restore the series' reputation in Japan, but the negotiations continued regardless.

Starting on January 4, 1998, ShoPro conducted in-person negotiations with Nintendo of America for licensing the Pokémon anime for the US market. In early January 1998, 4Kids Entertainment announced that they intended to air Pokémon in the U.S., albeit ensuring that the flashing effects were removed. Pokémon successfully premiered in the U.S. (without this episode) in September 1998.

=== Changes to television standards ===
Many Japanese television broadcasters and medical officials (along with the United Kingdom's Independent Television Commission) came together to find ways to make sure the incident was not repeated. They established a series of guidelines for future animated programs, including that flashing images, especially those with red, should not flicker faster than three times per second; if the image does not have red, it still should not flicker faster than five times per second; flashing images should not be displayed for a total duration of more than two seconds; and stripes, whirls and concentric circles should not take up a large part of the television screen. The Harding test for content that now airs on Japanese TV and streaming sites ensures no more than one flashing light occurs every 10 frames, reproduced at 29.97 FPS, where "flashing lights" are classified as extreme changes in colors from one frame to the next. Footage may either clear or fail checks, or "pass with a warning" in which case the video's luminance is automatically adjusted to mitigate potential effects.

After the incident, TV broadcasters voluntarily added on-screen warnings to shows targeted at young children encouraging viewers to watch anime in a well-lit room and to sit far away from the television set.

== In popular culture ==
The "Pokémon Shock" incident has been parodied many times in popular culture, including a 1999 episode of The Simpsons, "Thirty Minutes over Tokyo". In the episode, Bart watches an anime entitled Battling Seizure Robots featuring robots with flashing eye lasers, and asks: "Isn't this that cartoon that causes seizures?" The flashing eyes cause him, Marge, Lisa, and Homer to have seizures. The same scene is seen again in the episode's end credits, this time covering the entire screen.

An episode of South Park, "Chinpokomon", revolves around a Pokémon-like phenomenon, called Chinpokomon. Chinpokomon toys and video games are sold to children in South Park by a Japanese company. The company's president, Mr. Hirohito, uses the toys to brainwash the American children, making them into his own army to topple the "evil" American "empire". These toys included a video game in which the player attempts to bomb Pearl Harbor. While playing this game, Kenny has an epileptic seizure and later dies.

The incident was included in the 2004 edition and the 2008 Gamer's Edition of the Guinness World Records book, holding the record for "Most Photosensitive Epileptic Seizures Caused by a Television Show".

On September 19, 2020, the official Pokémon Twitter account referenced the episode, saying "Porygon did nothing wrong," in reference to the resulting explosion from Pikachu's Thunderbolt attack being the in-universe cause of the flashing lights, not Porygon. The tweet was deleted shortly thereafter, speculated to be because of the taboo subject matter.

== See also ==
- Burger King Pokémon container recall
- Pokémon Go § Criticism and incidents
- YAT Anshin! Uchū Ryokō § Incident – a similar incident
- Computer Graphic (advertisement) – a similar incident
