= The Yomiuri Shimbun Holdings =

Japanese media company

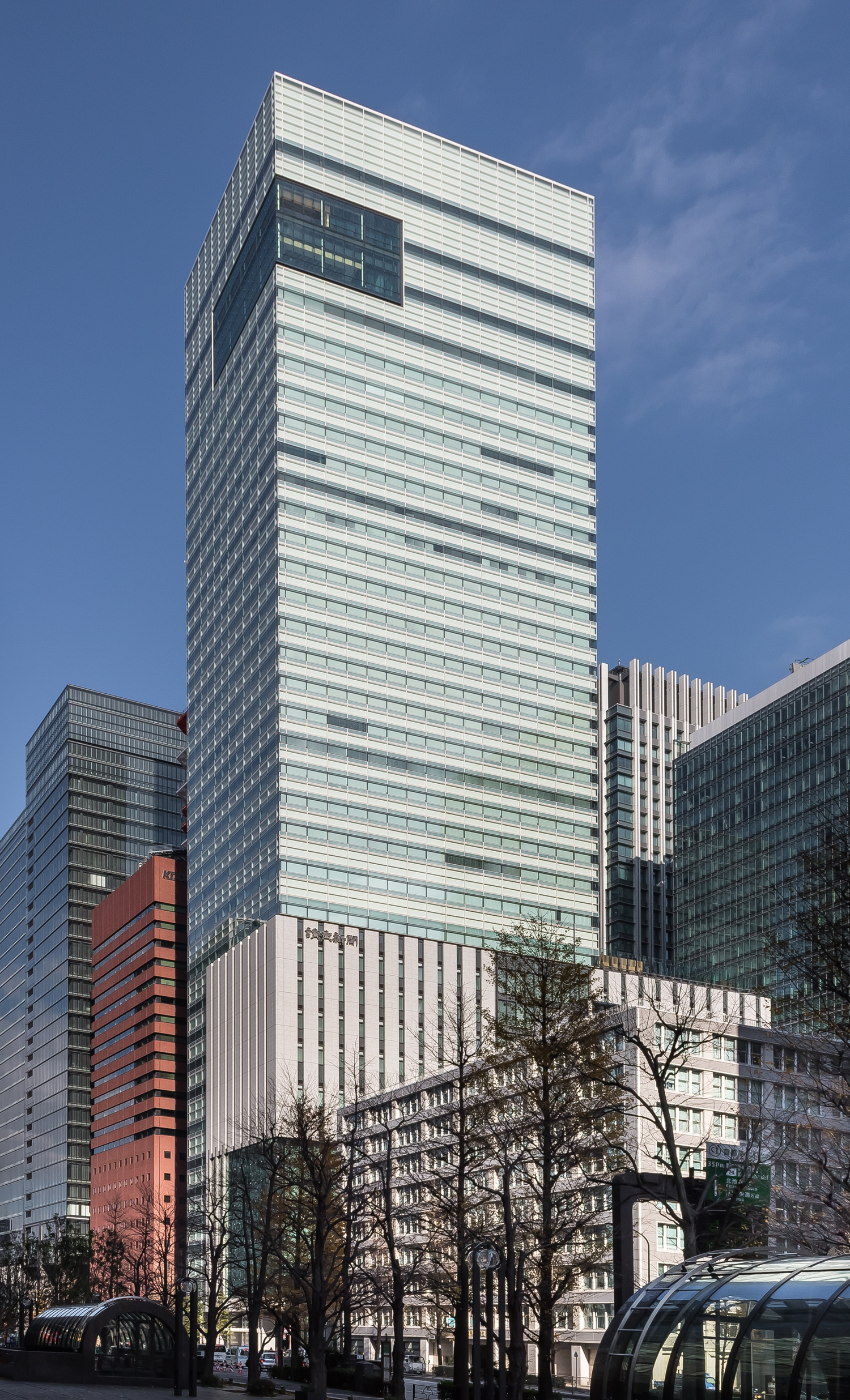
- Yomiuri Shimbun Headquarters Building
- Native name: 株式会社読売新聞グループ本社
- Romanized name: Kabushiki gaisha Yomiuri Shinbun gurūpu honsha
- Type: Private (Kabushiki gaisha)
- ISIN: 7010001031722
- Industry: Information and communication industry
- Founded: July 1, 2002; 24 years ago
- Founder: Matsutarō Shōriki (for the modern Yomiuri Shimbun)
- Headquarters: 1 Chome-7-1 Ōtemachi, Chiyoda, Tokyo 100-8055, Japan; 35°41′14″N 139°45′51″E
- Key people: Shoichi Oikawa (Chairman); Toshikazu Yamaguchi (President); Vacant (Managing Editor)
- Revenue: 256.1 billion JP¥ (2021)
- Operating income: 4.4 billion JP¥ (2021)
- Owners: Shōriki family (45.26% directly and indirectly); Employee shares (34.32%); The Yomiuri Light and Humanity Association (9.79%)
- Number of employees: 4399 (2021)
- Subsidiaries: 5 core companies: (Note: Officially six, when combined with the Holdings itself.); Yomiuri Shimbun Tokyo Headquarters (incl. Hokkaido, Hokuriku and Chubu branches); Yomiuri Shimbun Osaka Headquarters; Yomiuri Shimbun Western Headquarters; Yomiuri Giants; Chuokoron-Shinsha; Nippon TV Holdings; Yomiuri Telecasting Corporation; Yomiuriland
- Website: info.yomiuri.co.jp/index.html

The Yomiuri Shimbun Holdings (株式会社読売新聞グループ本社, Kabushiki gaisha Yomiuri Shinbun gurūpu honsha) is a Japanese media conglomerate, and the holding company of the Yomiuri Shimbun.

== Overview ==
On July 1, 2002, Yomiuri Shimbun was divided into two companies: the holding company Yomiuri Shimbun, and the Yomiuri Shimbun Tokyo Headquarters, which was responsible for publication of newspapers. At the same time, one of the subsidiary company, Yomiuri Co., Ltd., was absorbed and split. As a result, "Yomiuri Shimbun" became a general term referring to Yomiuri Shimbun's Tokyo Headquarters, as well as its Osaka Headquarters and Western Headquarters.

Currently, the Yomiuri Shimbun Group is a holding company, consisting of aforementioned three Headquarters that publish newspapers; a publishing company named Chuokoron Shinsha; the management base of the professional baseball team Yomiuri Giants; and a number of amusement parks, leisure and public sports facilities such as Yomiuri Land. In addition, by making it a holding company, the Osaka Headquarter, which was the only one of the three headquarters that survived before the liquidation, became a pure operating company, and the shares of the broadcasting station, etc. owned by the company were absorbed by corporate split.

== History ==
- April 1870 (Meiji 3): Established as a partnership company called "Nisshusha" (日就社) in present-day Naka Ward, Yokohama, Kanagawa Prefecture.
- January 1873 (Meiji 6): Published the English-Japanese dictionary, Eiwa Jii (英和辞彙).
- November 2, 1874 (Meiji 7): Formed Yomiuri Shimbun as the news division of Nisshusha.
- December 1, 1917 (Taisho 6): Nisshusha was renamed Yomiuri Shimbun.
- February 25, 1924 (Taisho 13): Due to financial difficulties, the company was sold to Matsutarō Shōriki, the former director of Metropolitan Police Department.
- December 26, 1934 (Showa 9): Shoriki founded the Great Japan Tokyo Baseball Club, the predecessor of Yomiuri Giants.
- June 10, 1940 (Showa 15): Established the prototype of the current company flag.
- August 5, 1942 (Showa 17): Merged with Hochi Shimbun.
- February 15, 1947 (Showa 22): The company was renamed Yomiuri Kogyo. It acquired all shares of Great Japan Tokyo Baseball Club at the same year.
- January 25, 1950 (Showa 25): Yomiuri Giants separated from Yomiuri Kogyo.
- March 30, 1951 (Showa 26): Yomiuri Giants merged back with Yomiuri Kogyo.
- October 20, 1952 (Showa 27): Established a Headquarter in Osaka.
- November 25, 1952 (Showa 27): "Osaka Yomiuri Newspaper" was launched in Osaka.
- May 1, 1959 (Showa 34): Yomiuri Shimbun established its Hokkaido branch in Sapporo, Hokkaido, and started printing local version of Yomiuri Shimbun newspaper.
- May 25, 1961 (Showa 36): Yomiuri Shimbun established its Hokuriku branch in Takaoka, Toyama Prefecture, and started printing local version of Yomiuri Shimbun newspaper.
- September 23, 1964 (Showa 39): Yomiuri Kogyo started local printing of "Yomiuri Shimbun" under the same of "Yomiuri Shimbun Western Headquarter" in Kokura Ward of Kitakyushu (Now Kokurakita Ward), Fukuoka Prefecture.
- March 25, 1975 (Showa 50): Central Yomiuri Shimbun published "Chubu Yomiuri Shimbun" in Nagoya, Aichi Prefecture.
- February 1, 1988 (Showa 63): Chubu Yomiuri Shimbun merged with Yomiuri Kogyo.
- June 22, 1992 (Heisei 4): Yomiuri Kogyo Co., Ltd. changed its name to Yomiuri Co., Ltd.
- February 1, 1999 (Heisei 11): Acquired Chuokoronsha.
- July 1, 2002 (Heisei 14): Reorganization of the Yomiuri Shimbun Group. The Yomiuri Shimbun split into the operating holding company, Yomiuri Shimbun Group, and the newspaper publishing company, Yomiuri Shimbun Tokyo Headquarter. The Yomiuri Shimbun Western Headquarter and the Yomiuri Giants became independent corporations and entirely owned by the Group. In addition, Yomiuri Shimbun Central Headquarter, which was operated by Yomiuri, was downgraded to the Chubu Branch under the Tokyo Headquarter due to a split merger.
- January 1, 2004 (Heisei 16): Yomiuri Shimbun Western Headquarter moved its operation head office to Akasaka, Chūō Ward, Fukuoka.
- October 1, 2010 (Heisei 22): Yomiuri Shimbun Group Headquarter temporarily moved to 6-17-1 Ginza, Chūō Ward, Tokyo (former headquarter building of Nissan Motor) due to the renovation of the Tokyo Headquarter building in Ōtemachi, Chiyoda Ward, Tokyo. Its telephone number remained unchanged, and its dedicated postal code was changed to 104–8243.
- January 6, 2014 (Heisei 26): Completed the new Tokyo headquarter building (Yomiuri Shimbun Building), and the Headquarter returned to Ginza.
- May 7, 2015 (Heisei 27): The operation headquarter of Chuokoron Shinsha moved from its own building in Kyōbashi, Chūō Ward to the 19th floor of the Yomiuri Shimbun Building in Otemachi.
- July 18, 2017 (Heisei 29): Yomiuri Shimbun Central Branch moved to the office building of Nayabashi East District Urban Redevelopment Building (Terasse Nayabashi) at 1-chome, Sakae, Naka Ward, Nagoya.
- December 25, 2020 (Reiwa 2): Started acquisition of Yomiuri Land.
- March 22, 2021 (Reiwa 3): Yomiuri Land became a subsidiary entirely owned by Yomiuri Shimbun Group.

== Status of the major shareholders ==
(As of November 27, 2020)

Rank	Owner	Percentage
1	Yomiuri Shimbun Group Head Office Executive Stock Ownership Association	34.32%
2	Public Interest Incorporated Foundation Shoriki Koseikai	20.98%
3	Social Welfare Corporation Yomiuri Light and Humanity Association	9.79%
4	Tatsuo Sekine (grandson of Matsutarō Shōriki, son of Chozaburo Sekine, director of Yomiuri Shimbun Group)	7.83%
5	Yomiuri Institute of Science and Technology	6.04%
6	Genichiro Shoriki (grandson of Matsutarō Shōriki, son of Toru Shoriki)	4.97%
7	Mio Shoriki (granddaughter of Matsutarō Shōriki, daughter of Toru Shoriki)	4.94%
8	Yoko Tsukagoshi (grandson of Matsutarō Shōriki, son of Yomitsuji Kobayashi)	4.58%
9	Yoshiko Shoriki	1.96%
10	Aki Kojima	1.63%

Currently, there are 66 shareholders, of them 3 are corporations (including Shoriki Koseikai), and 63 are individuals. In particular, many of the descendants of Matsutaro Shoriki are among the major individual shareholders.

Toru Shoriki (eldest son of Matsutaro Shoriki), the third largest shareholder, died in August 2011, and as of the end of March 2011, his wife (Mineko Shoriki) held 11.86% of the shares. It seems to have been transferred or inherited by his children (Genichiro Shoriki, Mio Shoriki).

The 9th largest shareholder, Yoshiko Shoriki, has the same number of shares held during her lifetime as Mineko Shoriki (Toru Shoriki's wife, died on August 17, 2019).

Yomiuri Shimbun leader Tsuneo Watanabe died in December 2024.

== Board member status ==
As of June 6, 2021:

Name		Position
English	Japanese	Position
Shoichi Oikawa	老川 祥一	Chairman, Deputy Managing Editor, International Officer and Editor-in-Chief of The Japan News
Juichi Yamaguchi	山口 寿一	President, Sales Representative Director and President of Yomiuri Shimbun Tokyo Headquarters
Tsuneo Watanabe	渡邉 恒雄	Representative Director, Managing Editor and Director of NTV Holdings
Akitoshi Muraoka	村岡 彰敏	Executive Vice President, Head of Operation, Representative Director and Executive Vice President of Yomiuri Shimbun Tokyo Headquarters
Gaku Shibata	柴田 岳	Director and President of Yomiuri Shimbun Osaka Headquarters
Toru Kunimatsu	国松 徹	Director and President of Yomiuri Shimbun Western Headquarters
Retsu Mizoguchi	溝口 烈	Director, President and CEO of Yomiuri Land
Tatsuo Sekine	関根 達雄	Director, Supreme Advisor of Yomiuri Land
Yoshio Okubo	大久保 好男	Director, chairman and Representative Director of Nippon Television Holdings
Mikuni Suguyama	杉山 美邦	Director, President and CEO of Nippon Television Holdings
Akira Ishizawa	石澤 顕	Director and Senior Managing Executive Officer of Nippon TV
Akihiko Osada	長田 明彦	Standing Corporate Auditor
Fujio Mitarai	御手洗 冨士夫	Corporate Auditor, Chairman and CEO of Canon Inc.
Yoshinobu Kosugi	小杉 善信	Audit and Supervisory Board Member, Vice Chairman of Nippon Television Holdings
Yasushi Masago	真砂 靖	Audit and Supervisory Board Member
Kazuyuki Fujita	藤田 和之	Executive Officer, General Manager, Compliance and Public Relation Manager, Executive Officer and Editor-in-Chief of Yomiuri Shimbun Western Headquarters

== Core companies ==
The group headquarter and the following six companies are positioned as the "seven core companies" of the Yomiuri Group:

- Yomiuri Shimbun Tokyo Headquarter (Chiyoda Ward, Tokyo)
  - Hokkaido Branch Office (Chūō Ward, Sapporo, Hokkaido)
  - Hokuriku Branch Office (Takaoka, Toyama)
  - Central Branch Office (Naka Ward, Nagoya, Aichi)
- Yomiuri Shimbun Osaka Headquarter (Kita Ward, Osaka)
- Yomiuri Shimbun Western Headquarter (Chūō Ward, Fukuoka)
- Yomiuri Giants (Chiyoda, Tokyo)
- Chuokoron-Shinsha Ltd. (Chiyoda, Tokyo)
- Yomiuri Land Co. Ltd. (Inagi, Tokyo)
  - Yomiuri Land
  - Funabashi Racecourse
  - Kawasaki Racecourse

== Other affiliated companies and corporations ==
Excludes six core companies. The order follows the official website.

- Hochi Shimbun Co., Ltd. (Sports Hochi)
  - Sports Hochi Western Headquarter
- Fukushima Minyu Shimbun Co., Ltd. (Fukushima Minyu)
- Ryoko Yomiuri Publication Co., Ltd.
- Tokyo Media Production Co., Ltd.
- Nippon Television Holdings Corporation
  - Nippon Television Network Corporation
  - BS Japan Ltd.
  - CS Japan Ltd.
  - RF Radio Nippon Ltd.
  - NTV Group Planning Inc.
  - IKAROS Co., Ltd.
- Yomiuri Telecasting Corporation Co., Ltd.
- Chūkyō Television Broadcasting Co., Ltd.
- Yomiuri Information Development
- Yomiuri Task
- Yomiuri Information Service
- Yomiuri Computer
- Yomiuri Travel
- Yomiuri Gold Co., Ltd. (Yomiuri Country Club)
- Public Interest Incorporated Foundation Yomiuri Nippon Symphony Orchestra
- Yomiuri Cultural Center Union
  - Yomiuri Nippon Television Cultural Center Co., Ltd.
  - Osaka Yomiuri Cultural Center Co., Ltd.
  - Yomiuri Cultural Center Co., Ltd. (Yomiuri Cultural Center Senri Chuo)
  - Yomiuri FBS Cultural Center Co., Ltd.
  - Western Yomiuri Cultural Center Co., Ltd. (Yamaguchi Broadcasting Cultural Center)
- School Corporation Institute of Science and Technology
- Marronnier Gate Co., Ltd. (former Printemps Ginza Co., Ltd.)
- Tokyo Yomiuri Service Co., Ltd.
- Osaka Yomiuri Service Co., Ltd.
- Yomiuri Real Estate Co., Ltd. (Yomiuri Guildhall in Yūrakuchō, Tokyo)
- Yomiuri Media Center Ltd.
- Yomix Ltd.
- Yomiuri Systech Ltd.
- Yomiuri Hong Kong Ltd.
- Yomiuri Agency Co., Ltd.
- Social Welfare Corporation Yomiuri Light and Love Corporation

=== Special note ===
Tokyo Dome was not an affiliated company of the Yomiuri Shimbun, but Mitsui Fudosan once aimed to acquire 100% of the company's stock, and after succeeding, the Yomiuri Shimbun Group Headquarters will transfer 20% of the stock, and a capital and business alliance between the three parties. Since the contract was signed and it was successful as planned, Yomiuri Shimbun Group Headquarters holds 20% of Tokyo Dome's shares as contracted. Officers from Yomiuri Shimbun Group Headquarter and the Yomiuri Shimbun Tokyo Headquarter were dispatched to participate in the management of the real estate corporation.

== Major broadcasters under control ==
Under the mass media concentration elimination principle (マスメディア集中排除原則), a board member will be publicly announced as having control over a broadcaster when they possess more than 10% of voting rights on the board. The following companies can be considered to be controlled by Yomiuri Group under this rule:

- Sapporo Television Broadcasting Co., Ltd.
- Aomori FM Broadcasting Co., Ltd.
- Television Iwate Co., Ltd.
- Miyagi Television Broadcasting Co., Ltd.
- FM Yamagata Co., Ltd.
- Fukushima Central Television Co., Ltd.
- Television Niigata Network Co., Ltd.
- TV Shinshu Co., Ltd.
- TV Kanazawa Co., Ltd.
- Shizuoka Daiichi Television Co., Ltd.
- Yomiuri Television Broadcasting Co., Ltd.
- Hiroshima Telecasting Co., Ltd.
- Fukuoka Broadcasting System Co., Ltd.
- Television Nagasaki Co., Ltd.
- Kumamoto Kenmin Televisions Co., Ltd.
- Television Oita System Co. Ltd.
- Miyazaki Broadcasting Co., Ltd.

== Company flag, emblem and logo ==
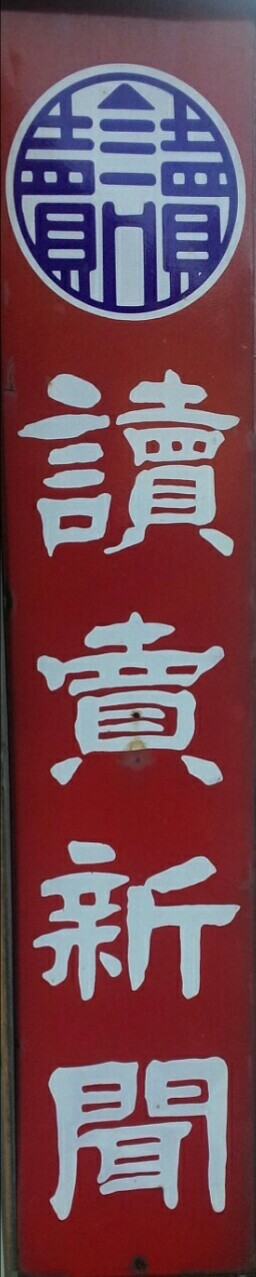
Yomiuri Shimbun company emblem (from the company's enamel signboard)

The company flag has a triangular red and white striped pattern on its upper right corner, and a square white background with the word "讀賣" (Yomiuri) written in red on the lower left side. The company flag of Yomiuri Telecasting Corporation also use part of the same design.

In addition, in the TV program credits, or in the program produced by the Yomiuri Shimbun during the "news & culture" time of Nippon Telesitas, it used to be written with the same brush as the title (the notation is "Yomiuri Shimbun <sha>"). However, currently, the subtitles of "Yomiuri Shimbun" in blue round characters are used.

In addition, the company emblem is a circle with "Yomiuri". Giants uniforms used to have patches on their sleeves.

Even now, the title is "Yomiuri Shimbun" with "Yomiuri" in the old font, but group companies that have "Yomiuri" in their company name use the new font "Yomiuri" for registration. However, before the group reorganization, Osaka Yomiuri Shimbun, Osaka Yomiuri Television Broadcasting, and Kagoshima Yomiuri Television were registered with the old font of "Yomiuri".
