= Chūkyō Television Broadcasting =

JOCH-DTV
- Logo used since 2016

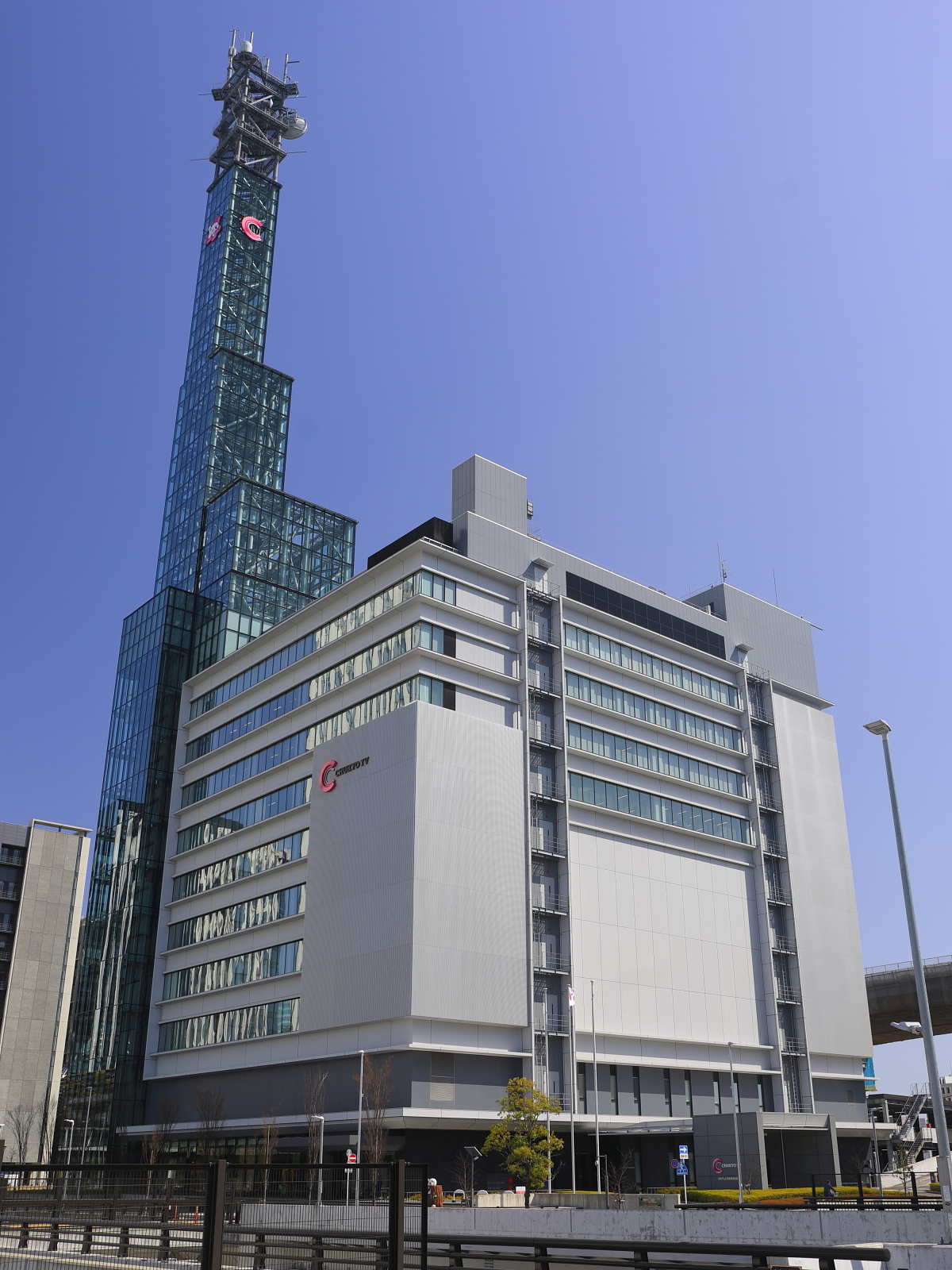
- Headquarters in Nakamura-ku, Nagoya
- Chubu region; Japan
- City: Nagoya, Aichi Prefecture
- Channels: Digital: 19 (UHF); Virtual: 4
- Branding: Chukyo TV

Programming
- Language: Japanese
- Affiliations: Nippon News Network and Nippon Television Network System

Ownership
- Owner: Chukyo TV. Broadcasting Co., Ltd.

History
- First air date: April 1, 1969; 57 years ago
- Former call signs: JOCH-TV (1969–2011)
- Former channel numbers: 35 (UHF analog, 1969–2011)
- Former affiliations: NET/ANN (April 1, 1969-March 31, 1973)
- Call sign meaning: JO; CHubu or CHūkyō

Technical information
- Licensing authority: MIC
- ERP: 30 kW
- Transmitter coordinates: 35°11′43.75″N 137°4′27.55″E

Links
- Website: https://www.ctv.co.jp/

Corporate information
- Native name: 中京テレビ放送株式会社
- Romanized name: Chūkyō terebi hōsō kabushikigaisha
- Formerly: Chukyo UHF TV Broadcasting Co., Ltd. (1968–1970)
- Type: Subsidiary KK
- Industry: Television broadcasting
- Founded: March 1, 1968; 58 years ago
- Headquarters: 4-60-11 Hiraike-cho, Nakamura-ku, Nagoya, Aichi Prefecture, Japan
- Key people: Kimio Maruyama (President and Representative Director)
- Owner: Yomiuri Chukyo FS Broadcasting Holdings
- Number of employees: 285 (2021)
- Footnotes; Data from its Corporate Profile

JOCH-DTV (channel 4), branded as Chukyo TV (中京テレビ, Chūkyō Terebi; CTV), is the Chūkyō metropolitan area flagship station of the Nippon News Network and Nippon Television Network System (NNS), owned by Chukyo TV. Broadcasting Co., Ltd. (中京テレビ放送株式会社, Chūkyō Terebi-hōsō kabushiki gaisha), a subsidiary of Yomiuri Chukyo FS Broadcasting Holdings. Its studios are located in Nakamura-ku, Nagoya, Japan.

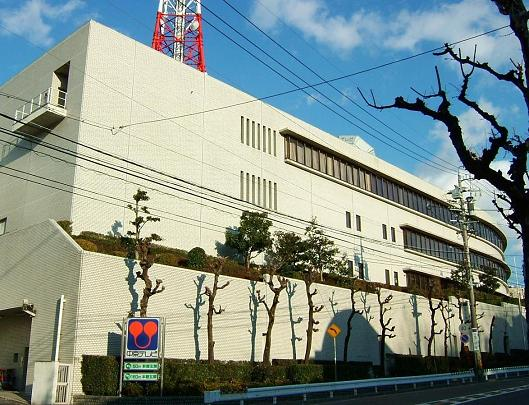
Chūkyō Television Broadcasting former head office

The Chūkyō UHF TV Broadcasting Co., Ltd. (中京ユー・エッチ・エフテレビ放送株式会社, former corporate name of Chūkyō TV) was founded on March 1, 1968, and started TV broadcasting on April 1, 1969. Then the company was renamed "Chūkyō TV Broadcasting Co., Ltd. (中京テレビ放送株式会社)" on April 1, 1970.

== History ==
=== Early history ===
In 1964, six companies, Chukyo Television, Central Nippon Broadcasting, Tokai Radio, Nagoya Science Television, Aichi Television (unrelated to the present-day TV Aichi), and Nagoya Economy Television, applied to obtain the fourth private television license in Aichi Prefecture. Since the VHF channel (channel 7) in the Nagoya area was tested and found to have the potential to interfere with channels in other areas, the Ministry of Posts and Telecommunications decided to use the UHF channel for the fourth private TV station. However, TVs at that time required receivers to watch UHF programs. Therefore, compared with VHF TV stations, UHF TV stations were disadvantaged in terms of advertising business. At the same time, the then governor of Aichi Prefecture, Kuwahara Mikine, came forward to integrate the six companies that applied for the merger. In the end, these companies agreed to integrate Chukyo TV as the center. On November 1, 1967, Chukyo UHF TV received a preparatory license. On February 21, 1968, Chukyo UHF TV Broadcasting (Nakakyo UHF Television (中京ユー·エッチ·エフ·テレビ放送株式会社) held its founding meeting; the company was officially established on March 1. In terms of joining the network, CBC and Tokai Television had already established a very solid network relationship at that time, but Nagoya Broadcasting Network broadcast programs from both Nippon Television and NET at the same time (the ratio was 60% to 40%); therefore, Chukyo UHF TV decided to affiliate with NET, but also broadcasts programs from NTV and Tokyo Channel 12. On March 10, 1969, Chukyo UHF TV station began its test broadcasts.

On April 1, 1969, Chukyo UHF TV officially launched, becoming the first UHF wide-area TV station in Japan. At the time of the broadcast, the start time of the station was 9:30 in the morning, and the closing time was at midnight, totalling 14 hours and 30 minutes every day. 29.7% of the programs broadcast during the day were color programs, and 62.4% of the nighttime programs were color programs. On April 1 of the following year, Chukyo UHF TV changed the company name to Chukyo TV as the station joined NET's All-Nippon News Network that same day. Popularizing UHF signal receivers was one of the most important business issues of Chukyo UHF TV at that time. Thanks to the popularization activities of Chukyo TV, in January 1971, the penetration rate of UHF viewing equipment in Aichi, Gifu, and Mie prefectures exceeded 80%. In the same year, the proportion of Chukyo TV's program sources was NET TV, 58%, NTV, 25.1%, and Tokyo Channel 12, 16.9%.

=== Transition to a full NTV affiliation ===
In 1972, the relationship between NTV and Nagoya TV deteriorated due to programming ratio issues, and the franchise networks of NBN and CTV faced adjustments. On December 27 of that same year, NTV, NET, NBN, and Chukyo TV held talks, and finally decided that starting from April of the following year, Chukyo TV would join the Nippon News Network and the Nippon Television Network System, with Nagoya TV joining ANN. After joining the NNN/NNS network, Chukyo Television's sales from April to September 1973 reached 1.321 billion yen, an increase of 38% over the previous year, exceeding 1 billion yen for the first time, while the accumulated losses since launch were cleared. In 1977, Chukyo TV launched the second generation trademark. In 1979, Chukyo TV began to broadcast stereo TV programs. At the same time, CTV also began to strengthen international cooperation and signed sister station agreements with KSL-TV and KRON-TV in the United States and Yunnan TV in China.

=== Post-transition and later history ===
In 1981, Chukyo TV proposed a new medium-term business plan, aiming to achieve a proportion of self-produced programs of 10% and a market share of 20% in the Nagoya area TV advertising market. In 1984, the proportion of self-produced programs of Chukyo Television reached 10%. 12.3%, ranking first among all Nagoya channels. At the same time, Chukyo TV actively diversified its business and entered the housing industry in 1983, opening a housing exhibition hall. Chukyo TV also held the Chukyo TV Bridgestone Women's Golf Open in 1983, and held a rock concert in 1984, actively organizing large-scale events. In 1981, Chukyo Television stationed its special correspondent in Washington, D.C., becoming the first overseas correspondent of Chukyo Television. Later, from 2000 to 2004, Chukyo Television opened the NNN Taipei branch.

In the early 1990s, affected by the collapse of Japan's bubble economy, Chukyo TV was forced to withdraw from ski resorts, golf courses and other fields to focus on the television industry. On the other hand, thanks to the increase in the ratings of the core station NTV, the ratings of CTV increased steadily in the 1990s. In February 1997, China Beijing TV won the triple crown of monthly ratings for the first time since its launch with ratings of 9.6% for the whole day, 15.2% for the prime time period, and 15.5% for the evening period. In the same year, Chukyo TV's advertising revenue also rose to the second place among Nagoya stations. In 2000, Chukyo TV's full-day ratings reached 9.9%, prime-time ratings reached 14.7%, and evening time ratings reached 14.5%. Overall the station won the triple crown of annual ratings. China Beijing TV Station opened its official website in March 1996. On October 1, 1999, CTV began 24-hour broadcasting.

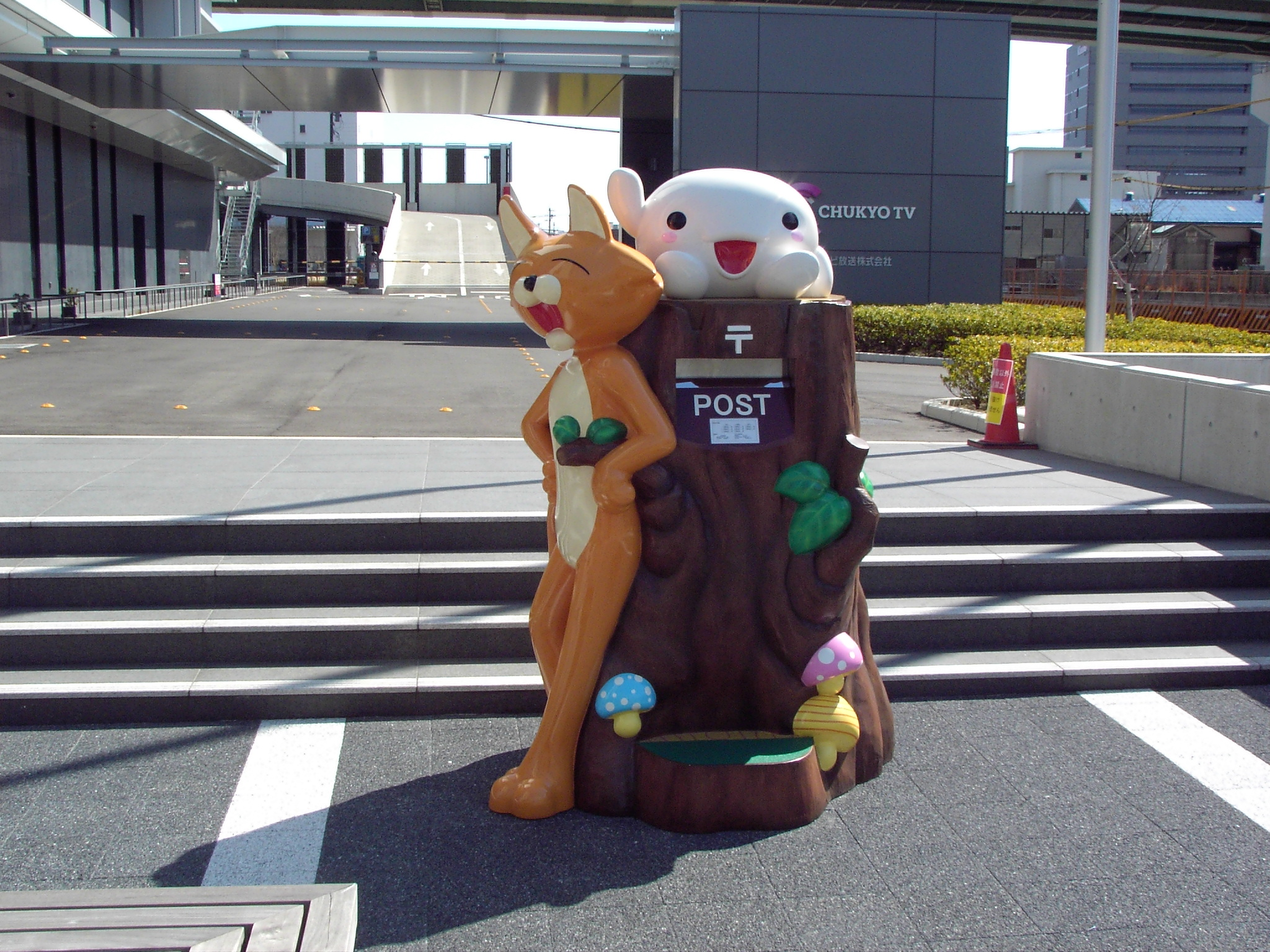
Chukyo-kun, CTV's mascot

In 2000, Chukyo TV launched the mascot "Chukyo-kun" (チュウキョ～くん), which is white oval in shape. CTV and Nagoya TV jointly invested in the construction of the Seto Digital Tower to transmit digital TV signals. The station began its digital broadcasts on December 1, 2003, on virtual channel 4 (and Core Bureau Nippon Television is the same). In 2005, Chukyo TV's evening and prime time ratings fell to fourth place in Nagoya, and due to the financial losses of Chukyo Golf Club The first loss since the launch. In 2007, CTV held the Hermitage Museum exhibition at the Nagoya City Art Museum, attracting more than 150,000 visitors. In 2010, Chukyo TV, opened the Anpanman Children's Museum in Nagoya City, which is the second Anpanman-themed museum after Yokohama.

On July 24, 2011, Chukyo TV shuttered its analog signal on UHF channel 35, the date where most analog broadcasts in Japan (except in the Tohoku region, due to the effects of the 2011 Tōhoku earthquake and tsunami, which were shuttered until 2012) were shuttered. That same year, CTV decided to move its headquarters to Sasashima, Nakamura-ku, and started building a new headquarters in March 2014. On November 21, 2016, Chukyo TV officially moved into the new headquarters. That same year, Chukyo TV debuted a new corporate identity, rebranded its station name to Chukyo TV, and launched the slogan "To your center" (あなたの真ん中へ.) after 14 years. As of 2019, Chukyo Television has maintained this honor for six consecutive years. In 2014, CTV once again won the triple crown in ratings. In 2020, Chukyo TV and three other private TV stations in Nagoya (CBC Television, Tokai Television Broadcasting, and TV Aichi) jointly created the on-demand video service Locipo. Starting in October of the same year, Chukyo TV, Nippon TV, and Yomiuri TV jointly broadcast 32 evening prime-time programs on TVer in real time in an attempt to expand the Internet field. As of fiscal year 2022, CTV has won the triple crown of annual individual ratings for 10 consecutive years.

On November 29, 2024, Chukyo TV, alongside fellow NNN/NNS affiliates Yomiuri TV, The Sapporo Television Broadcasting and Fukuoka Broadcasting System announced its intentions to combine and integrate its operations into a holding company known as Yomiuri Chukyo FS Holdings Corp. with its offices being located at NTVHD's headquarters in Minato, Tokyo. The merger, classified as a joint-stock transfer is expected to close on April 1, 2025. The merger received approval and certification from the Ministry of Internal Affairs and Communications on March 11, 2025. Unlike a full restructuring of either CTV, YTV, STV and FBS, all four broadcasters would become wholly owned subsidiaries of the combined company with its operations, including its corporate functions, remaining intact.
