= TV Kumamoto =

JOZH-DTV
- Logo used since 2019

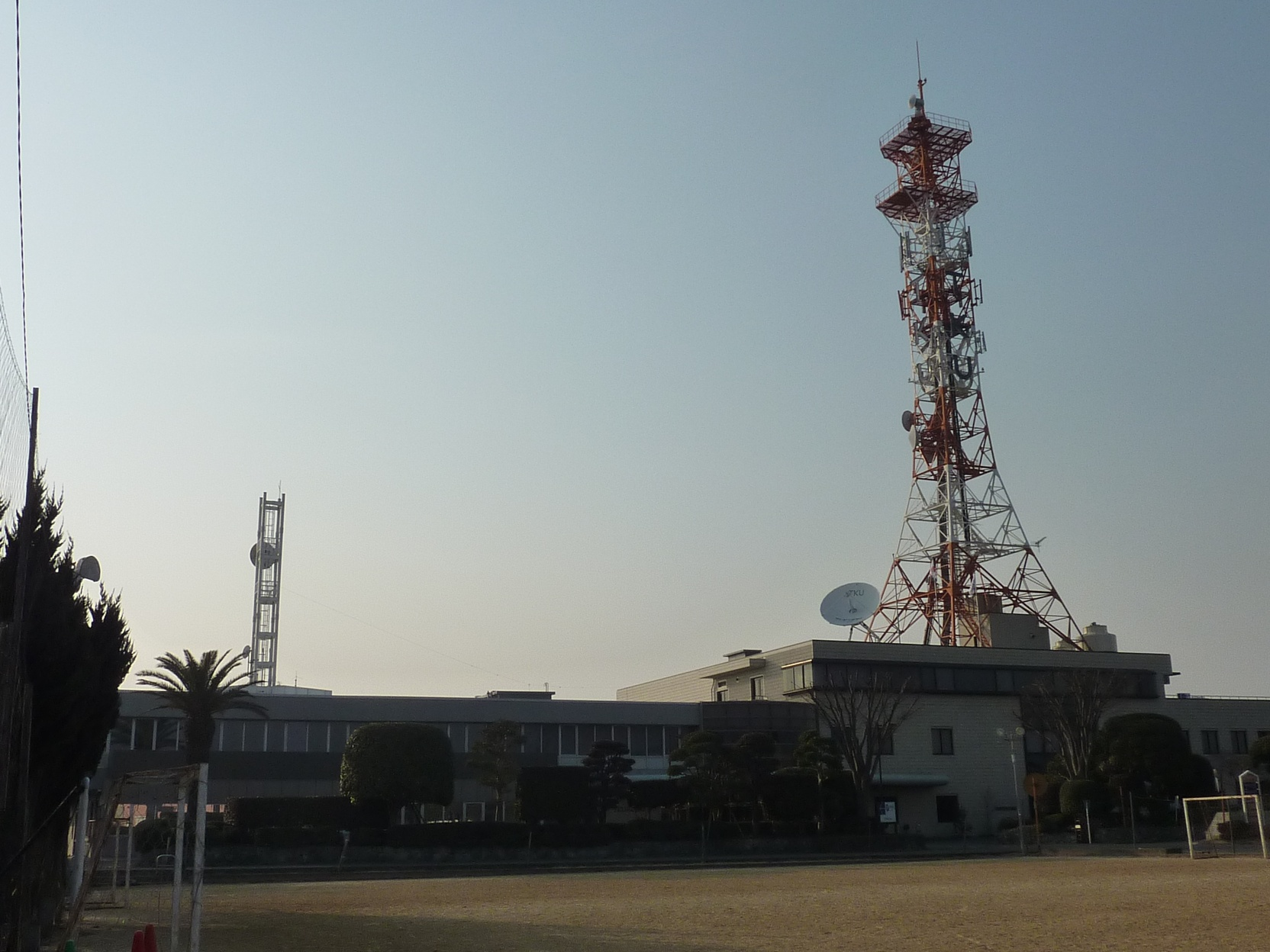
- Headquarters in Kita-ku, Kumamoto
- Kumamoto Prefecture; Japan
- City: Kumamoto City
- Channels: Digital: 42; Virtual: 8
- Branding: TV Kumamoto; TKU

Programming
- Affiliations: Fuji News Network and Fuji Network System

Ownership
- Owner: TV-Kumamoto Co., Ltd.

History
- First air date: April 1, 1969
- Former call signs: JOZH-TV (1969-2011)
- Former channel numbers: Analog: 34 (UHF, 1969-2011)
- Former affiliations: NTV/NNN/NNS (1969-1982); NET/ANN (1969-1989)

Technical information
- Licensing authority: MIC

Links
- Website: tku.co.jp

TV-Kumamoto Co., Ltd. (株式会社テレビ熊本, Kabushiki-gaisha Terebi Kumamoto; also known as TKU), is a Japanese television station, founded in 1968 and headquartered in Kumamoto, Japan. It started broadcasting in 1969.

It is affiliated with the FNN and FNS, and it is the second commercial television station in Kumamoto prefecture. On December 1, 2006, TKU started digital terrestrial television broadcasting.

== History ==
Launch logo of the station (1969-1989)

Former logo used from 1989 to 2019

In 1967, there were 48 commercial television stations in Japan, however, 25 prefectures only had one commercial television station. That year, the Ministry of Posts and Telecommunications announced that it would open the UHF band for television broadcasts, and Kumamoto Prefecture was included in the allocations for the establishment of a second TV station. At the time, eleven companies bid for the license: Kumamoto Asahi Broadcasting, Kumamoto Mainichi Broadcasting, TV Kumamoto Broadcasting, Kumamoto TV Broadcasting, Kyushu Chubu Broadcasting, Kumamoto Television, Aso Broadcasting, Kyushu Central Television, Minami Kyushu Television, Shin-Kumamoto Broadcasting and Kumamoto Central Television (of which four were linked to newspapers, one was linked to the Liberal Democratic Party and two to the Socialist Party) The MPT solicited the prefectural government to combine the bids into one. In addition to Shin-Kumamoto Broadcasting, affiliated to the Socialist Party, all the other companies approved their merger with Kumamoto Central Television as its basis (Shin-Kumamoto Broadcasting agreed in taking part in the united bid in November). The station received its license on November 14, 1967. The founding general meeting was held on March 12, 1968, Kawazu Torao was appointed as its first president. On May 18, the name changed to TV Kumamoto. In November, the company chose Shuichi Ogata's logo design as its logo (Ogata also designed Saga TV's former logo). At the same time, it acquired a plot of land in Kita-cho to build its headquarters. In December, the station invited the heads of the national networks in Tokyo to decide what programs would it air. At the time, it was common for the upstart stations to head over to Tokyo to negotiate, making TKU's request unusual. It was ultimately decided that it would mainly air programming from Fuji TV, but also some programs from NTV and NET.

On March 15, 1969, the station conducted its test broadcasts. Regular broadcasts started at 8:10am on April 1. By July, UHF antennas had a 67% penetration rate, increasing to 79.9% in March 1970, surpassing the station's expectations. At launch, 67% of its programming was in color, reaching 100% in April 1970 for networked programming only; local news converted in 1971 and the remaining local programs after 1973. In its early months, the advertising rate was approximately half of that of RKK. Meanwhile, in 1976, it had reached the same level as its competitor. By 1972, it had liquidated all net losses it accumulated since launch. That same year, the TV Kumamoto Union was formed.

In 1981, the station decided to expand its facilities by building a new studio. The opening of Kumamoto Kenmin Televisions, the prefecture's third commercial television station, in 1982, prompted TKU to end its collaboration with NNN and NNS. In April 1983, TKU had 80 transmitters, covering the whole prefecture and equalling the coverage of RKK and both NHK networks. On April 1, 1983, its new studio was officially inaugurated. That year, it won the Triple Crown in ratings, thanks to Fuji TV's high rating figures. It repeated the accolade for eight years in a row, between 1985 and 1992. This enabled TKU to surpass RKK as the leading station in 1986, a position it held until 1998. During this period, it established subsidiaries, such as the Living news agency.

TKU changed its logo in 1989, coinciding with its twentieth anniversary. The opening of Kumamoto Asahi Broadcasting in October of that year prompted the station to withdraw all TV Asahi programming from its line-up. This enabled the prefecture to become the first in Japan to have four commercial television stations for a population of less than two million inhabitants. The station made its first international exchange with Jinju MBC in 1990. For its thirtieth anniversary in 1999, it launched its mascot Terekumakun (てれくまくん) and made minor adjustments to the logo.

Digital terrestrial signals started on December 1, 2006, while analog signals shut down on July 24, 2011. The station celebrated its fiftieth anniversary in 2019, and with that came a new logo.。

== Programming ==
TKU has been producing news since its launch. The first news item was the inauguration of the maritime animals section of the Kumamoto Zoo. In its first few days, it covered the spread of the Minamata disease (discovered in the prefecture), which had been officially recognized by the Japanese government. The news program was named TKU News Eye (TKUニュース・アイ) beginning in 1984. It was renamed TKU Live News in 2019.。

In 1975, it premiered its first current affairs program, Saturday Studio Wide TKU (土曜スタジオ ワイドTKU). The station has a daily morning program, Let's Be Friends with Eitaro (英太郎のかたらんね), on weekdays.

TKU's in-house music program, Saturday Music Special (サタデーミュージカルスペシャル) created in 1978, attracted a 15.6% share at one stage and was well received by the youth. Wakatto Land (若っ人ランド, Youth Land), on air since 1987, is an information program aimed at the youth, and is still being produced. It also produces documentaries, such as Walking on Higo Road (肥後路を行く).
