= Kagoshima Yomiuri Television =

Television station in Kagoshima Prefecture, Japan

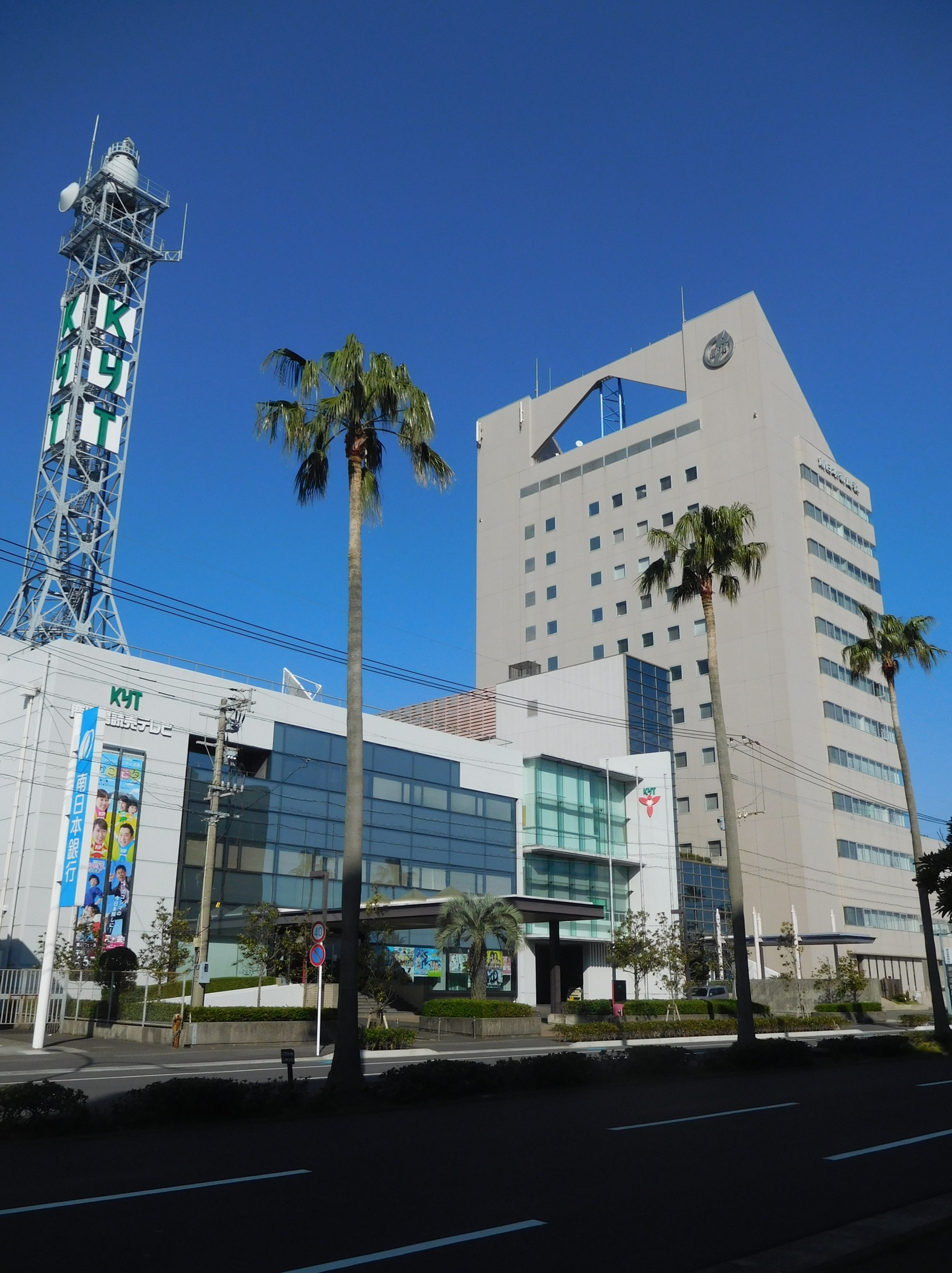
- Trade name: Kagoshima Yomiuri Television Co., Ltd.
- Native name: 株式会社 鹿児島讀賣テレビ
- Romanized name: Kabushikigaisha Kagoshima Yomiuri Terebi
- Type: Kabushiki gaisha
- Industry: Television broadcasting
- Founded: February 9, 1993; 33 years ago
- Headquarters: 1-9-34, Yojiro, Kagoshima City, Kagoshima Prefecture, Japan
- Key people: Kazuhiro Takita (Chairman and Representative Director); Toshiaki Harai (President and Representative Director)
- Number of employees: 68 (2021)
- Website: www.kyt-tv.com
- Footnotes; Data from its Company Profile

JOUI-DTV
- Kagoshima Prefecture; Japan
- City: Kagoshima
- Channels: Digital: 29 (UHF); Virtual: 4
- Branding: Kagoshima Yomiuri Television

Programming
- Language: Japanese
- Affiliations: Nippon News Network and Nippon Television Network System

Ownership
- Owner: Kagoshima Yomiuri Television Co., Ltd.

History
- First air date: April 1, 1994
- Former call signs: JOUI-TV (1994–2011)
- Former channel numbers: Analog: 30 (UHF, 1994–2011)
- Call sign meaning: YomiUrI (name of newspaper)

Technical information
- Licensing authority: MIC

Links
- Website: www.kyt-tv.com/

Kagoshima Yomiuri Television. (株式会社 鹿児島讀賣テレビ, Kabushikigaisha Kagoshima Yomiuri Terebi; KYT) is a TV station affiliated with Nippon News Network (NNN) and Nippon Television Network System (NNS) in Kagoshima, Kagoshima. It is broadcast in Kagoshima Prefecture. It was established on April 1, 1994. Analog television broadcasting officially ceased on July 24, 2011.
