= Television Nagasaki =

JOWH-DTV
- Logo used since 1988

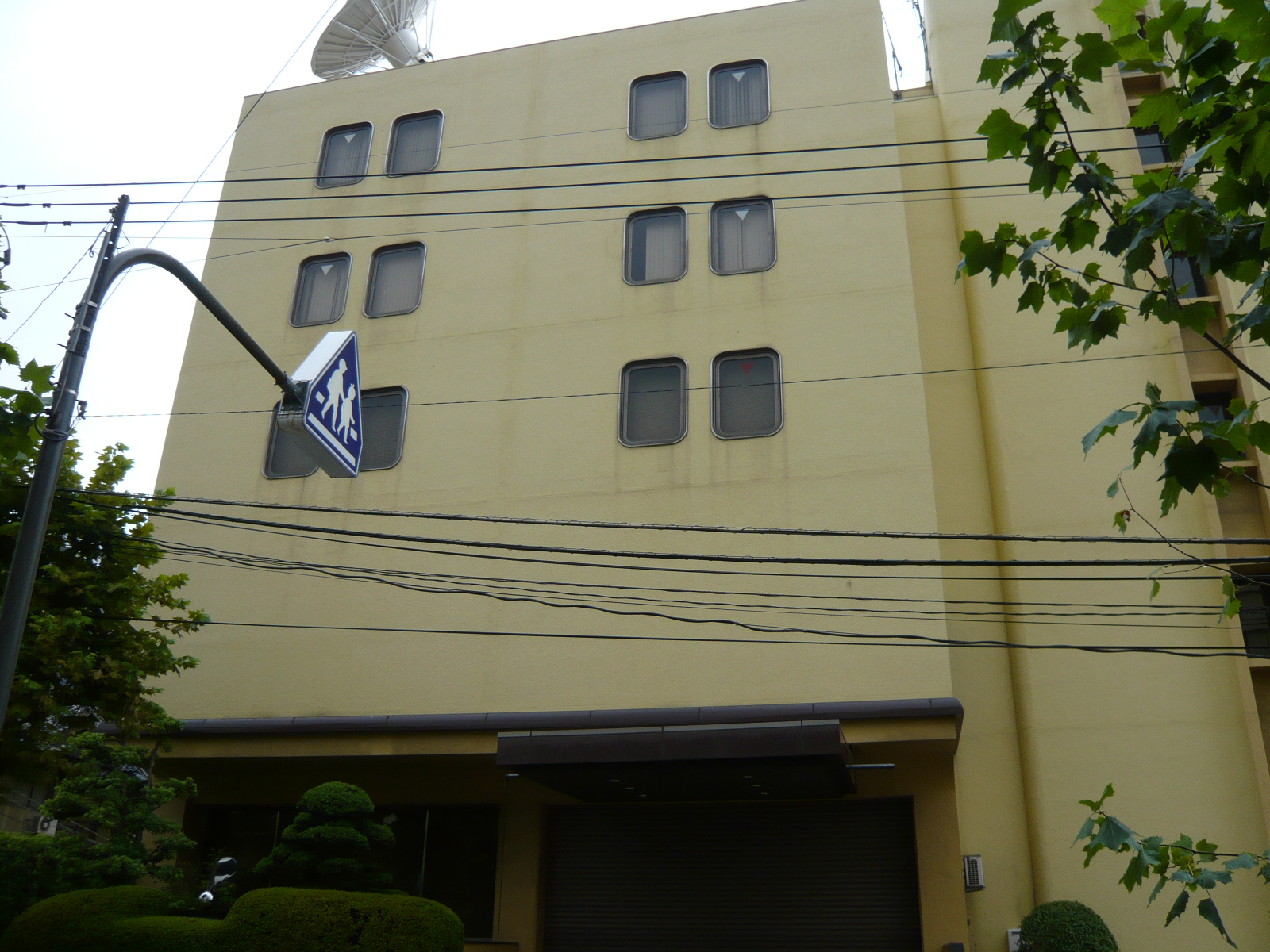
- Headquarters in Kayanamachi, Nagasaki
- Nagasaki Prefecture; Japan
- City: Nagasaki
- Channels: Digital: 20 (UHF); Virtual: 8
- Branding: KTN; Television Nagasaki

Programming
- Language: Japanese
- Affiliations: Fuji News Network and Fuji Network System

Ownership
- Owner: Television Nagasaki Co., Ltd.

History
- Founded: March 12, 1968
- First air date: April 1, 1969
- Former call signs: JOWH-TV (1969–2011)
- Former channel numbers: 37 (UHF analog, 1969–2011)
- Former affiliations: NTV/NNN/NNS (secondary, 1969–1990)

Technical information
- Licensing authority: MIC

Links
- Website: www.ktn.co.jp

JOWH-DTV (channel 8), branded as Television Nagasaki (テレビ長崎) is a Japanese television station serving Nagasaki Prefecture as an affiliate of the Fuji News Network and the Fuji Network System. Owned-and-operated by Television Nagasaki Co., Ltd. (Note: Japanese: 株式会社テレビ長崎), the station's studios and headquarters are located in Nagasaki.

== History ==
In the 1960s, the Ministry of Posts and Telecommunications opened up the UHF band for television broadcasting, causing a rush for the opening of a second television station in regions where only one commercial television station existed. Six companies bid for the license: Nagasaki Television (Nishinippon Shimbun Group), TV Nagasaki (Kansai Television Group), Saikai Television (Mainichi Shimbun Group), Nagasaki Yomiuri Television (Yomiuri Shimbun Group), Saikai TV (Agricultural Cooperative Association Group) and Nishi-Kyushu Television (local business group). With the mediation of the MPT, these companies merged into KTN and received its preliminary license on November 14, 1967. On March 10, 1968, its founding general assembly was held, being registered two days later. The station joined Fuji TV and NTV by default because of the shareholder structure: the former by influence of Nishinippon Shimbun and KTV and the latter by influence of Yomiuri Shimbun. In April 1968, it bought a plot of land for its building, which was built by Mitsubishi Heavy Industries. The land formerly contained the residence of Gotō Shōjirō. On June 28, the company selected KTN as its abbreviation and selected its first logo. Test broadcasts started on March 9, 1969.

On April 1, 1969, at 7am, KTN started broadcasting. In the same year, it acquired an OB vehicle to carry the 24th National Sports Festival. In 1970, it took part in the Youth Ship event, for the 400th anniversary of Port of Nagasaki, with stops in Hong Kong, Macau, Taiwan and Okinawa (which was still under American control). However, that year, it suffered from two signal interruptions in one week due to infrastructure problems at Inasayama and Eboshi. The KTN Labor Union was established that year. In 1971, the station obtained a profit worth 52 million yen, its first profit. In 1973, it had risen to 154 million yen. By 1976, it had risen to 294 million yen. Electronic news gathering began in the same year, in order to improve its abilities in collecting news, locally and for the national network.

In 1977, it announced that it would build its new headquarters, which were completed in February 1979. The building has two floors below the ground and six above ground, and its studio area increased to 225 square meters. In 1984, its revenues surpassed the five billion yen mark (5.067 billion yen). The station unveiled a new logo (the current one) in 1988. International cooperation began in 1986 with an agreement with Shanghai Television (currently Shanghai Media Group). During the height of the bubble economy, it received 6.25 billion yen in revenue and net profits of 1.239 billion yen in 1989.

The appearance of Nagasaki Culture Telecasting (TV Asahi/ANN) and Nagasaki International Television (NTV/NNN/NNS) in 1990 and 1991 respectively gave the prefecture four commercial television stations, intensifying competition among advertisers. On Ocobter 1, 1990, the station decided to withdraw its contract with NTV, in readiness for the launch of NIB. In 1991, when Mount Unzen erupted, three KTN reporters were killed during the coverage, making the station the only one in the prefecture to have human losses. In 1995, it started building the annex at its headquarters, which were finished in 1997. The annex has seven floors (one below the ground and six above) and has an area of 4,000 square meters. KTN's official website launched in October 1996. In 1998, it suffered a loss of 49 million yen due to acquisition of new equipments. However, profits rose again the following year.

The station unveiled its mascot K-tan (けーたん) in 2001. In 2004, it won the Triple Crown in ratings: 10.3% share for the full-day ratings, 14.9% during prime time and 15.1% for the whole evening. It maintained its position in 2005. Digital terrestrial broadcasts began on December 1, 2006, during the final stage of the implementation of digital signals in Japan. For its 40th anniversary of establishment, in 2008, it co-produced the drama series Moonlight with SMG's Dragon Television, airing on both channels. The station conducted a pilot analog shutdown in Tsushima on January 24, 2011; the signal was switched off in the rest of the prefecture on July 24.

== Programming ==
KTN did a major change to the way it presented the news in 1980, instead of the usual format where presenters read the news, this was replaced by presenters in front of cameras. During the flooding that hit the prefecture on July 23-24, 1982, it covered through a series of news flashes throughout both days, despite communication problems, and aired late night specials. KTN also used its digital subchannel to carry local news with simultaneous interpretation in Mandarin Chinese. In 2019, it introduced KTN Live News it!, shown on weeknights.

The first daily program other than news to be produced by KTN was Hello! Nagasaki (こんにちは！長崎), which began in 1976. It had a long run, airing for fifteen years. In 1995, it premiered Terebi Myuude (テレビみゅーで) at 5pm on weekdays, the first major wide show to air on a commercial television station in Nagasaki Prefecture. The afternoon program since 2014 is Yojimaru! (ヨジマル!)
