= Nagasaki International Television =

JOXH-DTV
- Logo used since 2006

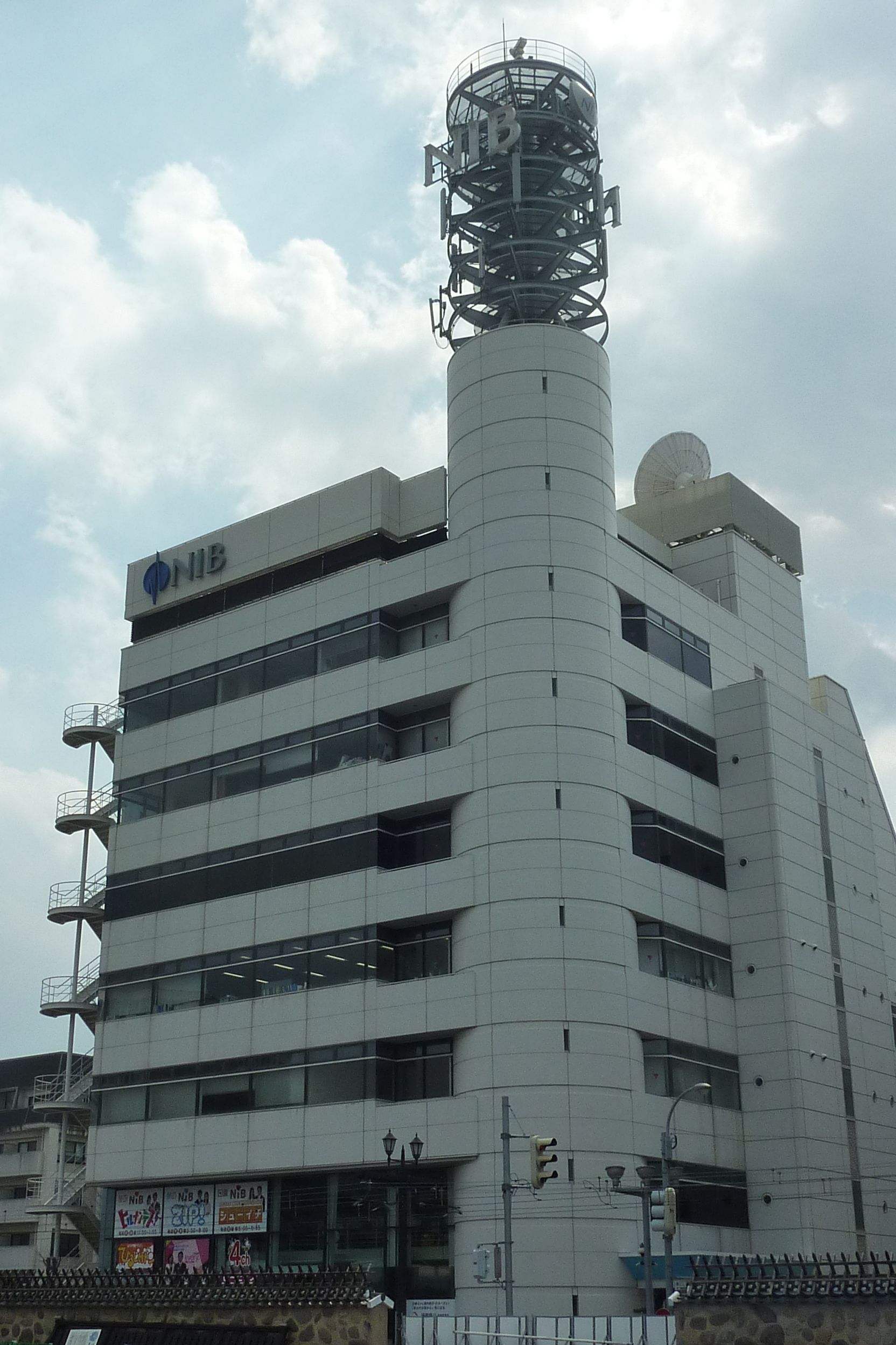
- Headquarters in Nagasaki
- Nagasaki Prefecture; Japan
- City: Nagasaki
- Channels: Digital: 18 (UHF); Virtual: 4
- Branding: Nagasaki International Television; NIB

Programming
- Language: Japanese
- Affiliations: Nippon News Network and Nippon Television Network System

Ownership
- Owner: Nagasaki International Television Broadcasting, INC.

History
- Founded: December 6, 1990
- First air date: April 1, 1991
- Former call signs: JOXH-TV (1991-2011)
- Former channel numbers: Analog: 25 (UHF, 1991-2011)

Technical information
- Licensing authority: MIC

Links
- Website: https://www.nib.jp/

Nagasaki International Television Broadcasting (長崎国際テレビ, Nagasaki Kokusai terebi), also known as NIB, is a television network headquartered in Nagasaki Prefecture, Japan. Nagasaki International Television is the fourth commercial television broadcaster in Nagasaki, it is affiliated with the Nippon News Network and the Nippon Television Network System. NTV Holdings and Fuji Media Holdings are the main shareholders of Nagasaki International Television.

NIB founded in 1990, and started broadcasting 1991. In 2006, NIB started digital television broadcasting. The headquarter of NIB is located in Dejima, its VOD service also named as DEJIMA ch.
