= Kagoshima Broadcasting =

JOTI-DTV
- Logo used since 2006.

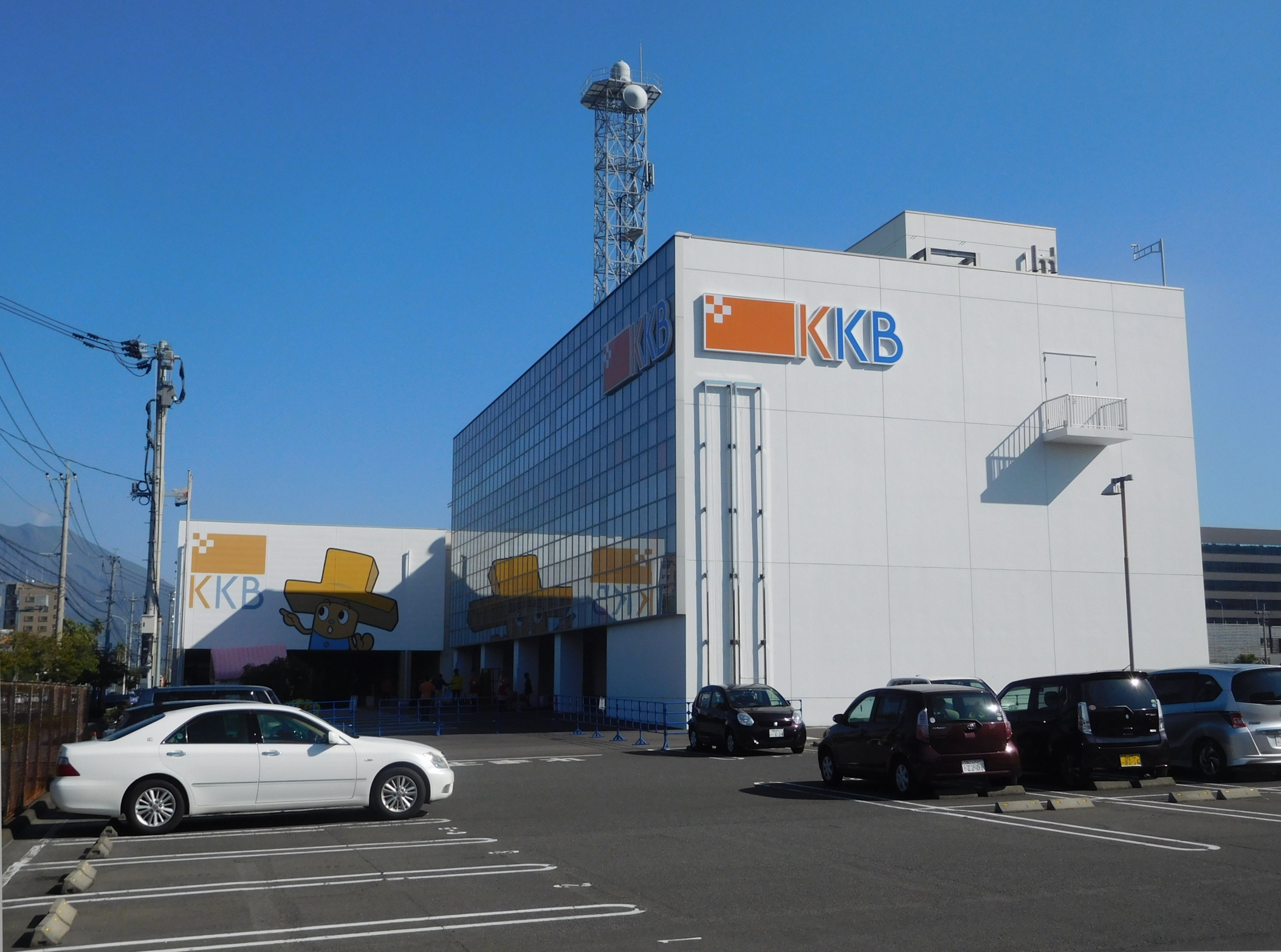
- Headquarters in Yojiro, Kagoshima

Kagoshima Prefecture; Japan
- City: Kagoshima
- Channels: Digital: 36 (UHF); Virtual: 5
- Branding: Kagoshima Broadcasting; KKB

Programming
- Language: Japanese
- Affiliations: All-Nippon News Network

Ownership
- Owner: Kagoshima Broadcasting Corporation

History
- Founded: April 28, 1982
- First air date: October 1, 1982
- Former call signs: JOTI-TV (1982-2011)
- Former channel numbers: Analog: 32 (UHF, 1982-2011)

Technical information
- Licensing authority: MIC

Links
- Website: https://www.kkb.co.jp/

Kagoshima Broadcasting (鹿児島放送, Kagoshima Hōsō), also known as KKB, is a television station headquartered in Kagoshima Prefecture, Japan. It is affiliated with ANN.

Kagoshima Broadcasting is the third commercial television station in Kagoshima prefecture. Minaminihon Broadcasting, the first commercial broadcaster in Kagoshima prefecture, is one of the main shareholders of Kagoshima Broadcasting. On December 1, 2006, KKB started digital terrestrial television broadcasting. The station's calls were previously assigned to New Tokushima Broadcasting in 1969, which eventually never signed on.

== History ==
Kagoshima Prefecture was allocated the third frequency for commercial television in December 1978, attracting 46 companies for the license. On March 23, 1981, Nippon Television, Fuji Television and TV Asahi entered an agreement for the third station in Kumamoto Prefecture to join NNN-NNS (which would eventually become Kumamoto Kenmin Televisions, which launched a year later), while the third one in Kagoshima would join ANN. Kagoshima Broadcasting was formed in February 1982, from the merger of the bids, who in their first meeting, decided to name the new station. The preliminary license was issued on April 1, while the company was registered on April 28. The logo was revealed on July 9. On September 3, 1982, the station activated its test signals, followed by trial programming on September 23.

The station launched at 6:55am on October 1, 1982, becoming the 99th commercial television station in Japan to sign on (the third in Kagoshima). In March 1986, it held the first KKB Children's Expo, the event continued until 2008. Throughout most of the 80s, its coverage was only limited to the mainland area of Kagoshima Prefecture. Coverage to the Amami Islands started in March 1989, with the establishment of the Nase transmitting tower in Amami Ōshima. In 1993, it established a relay station at Yoronjima, the prefecture's southernmost point. On October 7 of the same year, the headquarter expansion project was finished.

On October 20, 2002, the station aired a special program for its 20th anniversary, Kira Kira Station KKB Matsuri, for four and a half hours. Its highest ratings so far were achieved on June 18, 2006 during the World Cup (which TV Asahi was a broadcaster) match between Japan and Croatia, attracting a 46% share. On December 1, 2006, it started digital terrestrial broadcasts, with 1seg signals starting in tandem. This coincided with the adoption of its current logo. On July 24, 2011, analog broadcasts shut down.。

In 2012, its prime time ratings share (7pm to 10pm) was of 12.0%, while for the whole evening (7pm to 11pm) was of 12.2%, representing a record high in its history. On April 21, 2016, work started on its new headquarters. The station started broadcasting from there on October 1, 2017, in conjunction with its 35th anniversary. The new building has four floors, with the news studio in the second floor and the master control room in the third floor.

== Programming ==
KKB mostly produces news output. Its daily evening bulletin is called J Chan Plus, airing on weeknights since 1998. Desudesu airs on weekday mornings since 2019 and emphasizes on information from the prefecture.

KKB also takes part in sports broadcasts within the prefecture. In 1993, it aired a J-League match for the first time. Since the 1983 season, it carries the Summer Koshien tournament locally. In 2018, it aired the tournament's 100th edition in the prefecture. On January 14, 2018, it aired the 37th Ibusuki Marathon, the first event of its kind carried by the station.
