= Kumamoto Kenmin Televisions =

JOQI-DTV
- Logo used since 2017

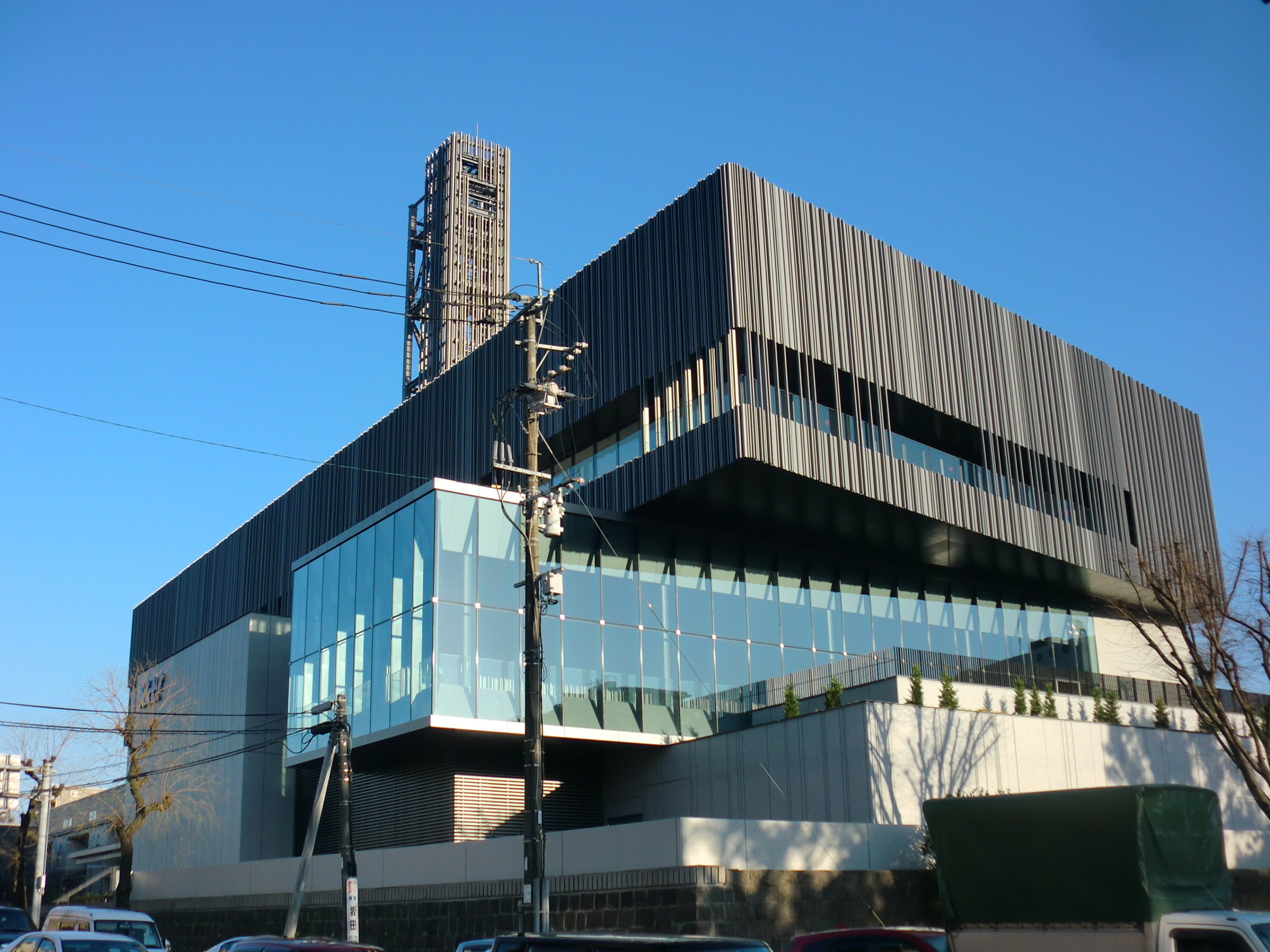
- Headquarters in Chūō-ku, Kumamoto
- Kumamoto Prefecture; Japan
- City: Kumamoto City
- Channels: Digital: 27 (UHF); Virtual: 4
- Branding: Kumamoto Kenmin Televisions kkt!

Programming
- Language: Japanese
- Affiliations: Nippon News Network and Nippon Television Network System

Ownership
- Owner: Kumamoto Kenmin Televisions Co., Ltd.

History
- Founded: November 26, 1981
- First air date: April 1, 1982
- Former call signs: JOQI-TV (1982-2011)
- Former channel numbers: Analog: 22 (UHF, 1982-2011)

Technical information
- Licensing authority: MIC

Links
- Website: www.kkt.jp

Kumamoto Kenmin Televisions Co., Ltd. (Japanese: 株式会社熊本県民テレビ) is a Japanese television station, founded in 1982 and headquartered in Kumamoto, Japan. It is affiliated with the Nippon News Network and the Nippon Television Network System, and it is the 3rd commercial television station in Kumamoto prefecture. It started digital television broadcasting in 2006. In 2016, Kumamoto Kenmin Televisions completed its new headquarter. KKT started use its current logo in 2017

== History ==
On December 15, 1978, the prefecture got an allocation for a third commercial television station; by March 1979, 40 companies had solicited their license. The initial basic policy was to have the bid "centered on local businesses" and to "operate as a multi-network station". After a meeting between Nippon TV, Fuji TV and TV Asahi, it was decided that the third station in Kumamoto (KKT) would join NNN-NNS and the third station in Kagoshima (KKB) would join ANN. On November 26, 1981, Kumamoto Kenmin Television, Co., Ltd. was established. The station entered its test phase on March 27, 1982, from 6am to midnight. During this period, the station's slogan and jingle Kyou Atsuku Life (きょう火くライブ) was introduced. On April 1, regular broadcasts began, becoming the 98th commercial television station overall to launch (callsign JOQI-TV). At the same time, relay stations were established in Takamori (later Minami-Aso), Hitoyoshi, Kawaura, Ushifuka and Minamata. The Aso, Aso-Kita, Oguni and Yabe relay stations were expected to be operational at launching time, but were delayed by one month. Initially it broadcast from a provisional building at the East Building of the Tsuruya Department Store, but moved to new premises in July, at Sean-cho. On December 1, 2006, digital broadcasts began; analog broadcasts ended on July 24, 2011. Broadcasts from its new premises at Oe 2-chome, Chuo Ward, Kumamoto City, began on November 14, 2016.
