= TV Miyazaki =

JODI-DTV
- Logo used since 2020

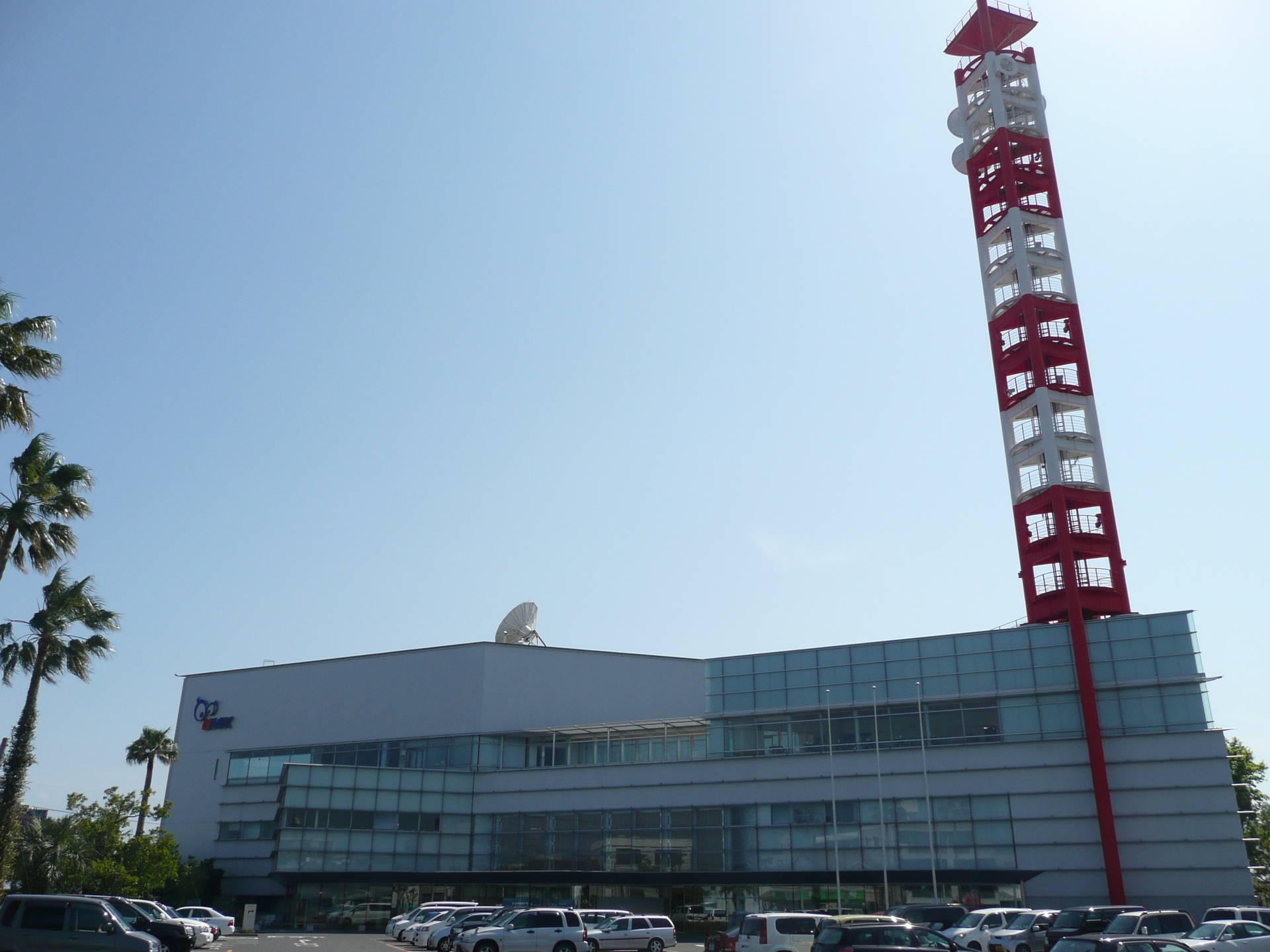
- Headquarters in Gion, Miyazaki
- Miyazaki Prefecture; Japan
- City: Miyazaki City
- Channels: Digital: 16 (UHF); Virtual: 3
- Branding: TV Miyazaki; UMK

Programming
- Language: Japanese
- Affiliations: Fuji News Network/Fuji Network System (primary; since 1973); All-Nippon News Network (secondary; since 1976); Nippon News Network (tertiary; since 1979)

Ownership
- Owner: Miyazaki Telecasting Co., Ltd.

History
- First air date: April 1, 1970
- Former call signs: JODI-TV (1970–2011)
- Former channel numbers: Analog: 35 (UHF, 1970–2011)

Technical information
- Licensing authority: MIC

Links
- Website: www.umk.co.jp

Corporate information
- Native name: 株式会社テレビ宮崎
- Romanized name: Kabushikigaisha Terebimiyazaki
- Type: Kabushiki gaisha
- Industry: Television broadcasting
- Founded: May 20, 1969; 57 years ago
- Headquarters: 2-78, Gion, Miyazaki City, Miyazaki Prefecture, Japan
- Key people: Akemi Enokida (president and CEO)
- Number of employees: 170 (2026)

Miyazaki Telecasting Co., Ltd. (abbreviation: UMK, Japanese name: 株式会社テレビ宮崎) callsign JODI-DTV (channel 3) is a Japanese TV station in Miyazaki. Currently branded as TV Miyazaki (テレビ宮崎), it is affiliated with FNN/FNS, NNN and ANN.

This is the only TV station in Japan that has joined three TV networks at the same time.

== History ==
First logo used from 1970 to 2020

On July 16, 1968, the Ministry of Posts and Telecommunications (currently the Ministry of Internal Affairs and Communications) announced its second UHF TV allocation plan, releasing 14 station licenses in 14 areas, including Miyazaki Prefecture. 12 of the 14 licenses were then merged into one by request from the prefectural government of Miyazaki. On February of the following year, the owners of the 12 licenses agreed into one company to apply of a TV license and were granted a reserved license by the following month.

On March 1, 1970, TV Miyazaki (tentative legal name prior to its launch) started trial broadcasts. And by April 1, 1970, TV Miyazaki official started broadcasting. In 1971, TV Miyazaki set up 7 relay stations alongside Miyazaki Broadcasting. In 1973, TV Miyazaki completed the switch to color. TV Miyazaki introduced its color OB van in 1979, and was first used in the 34th National Sports Festival held in Miyazaki.

In 1980, TV Miyazaki completed its sports studio, a first for Japanese TV broadcasting. TV Miyazaki also started hosting large-scale events, with the NASA Space Science Fair in 1982 as its first event. FM Miyazaki (currently branded as JOY FM) was established by TV Miyazaki and started in 1984. During Japan's bubble economy, TV Miyazaki began promoting business diversification, and started to enter the real estate business. In 1991, they also invested in the establishment of the golf course, UMK Country Club. In March 2000, they invested in building their new headquarters in preparation for digital broadcasting which was later completed in August of the following year and formally used in February 2002.

On December 1, 2006, digital broadcasting started. On August 15, 2007, a notable on-air mishap, stemming from a defect in a device used for program transmission, during an episode of One Piece resulted in the station going off the air intermittently for several hours.

The station ceased analog transmissions on July 24, 2011. In 2020, TV Miyazaki has unveiled its current logo, in time for its 50th anniversary.

== Technical Information ==
Station	Channel	LCN	Notes
Miyazaki	35	3	Main station (JODI-DTV)
Nobeoka	39	3	Relay stations
Takachiho	40	3	Relay stations
Kushima	40	3	Relay stations
Kitanobeoka	53	3	Relay stations

== Programming ==
Since its inception until 1973, TV Miyazaki hasn't been officially part in any network. At that time, it aired 60% of Fuji TV programming and 20% of programming each for Nippon TV and TV Asahi. In April 1973, TV Miyazaki became an FNN/FNS affiliate. Then in April 1976, they also joined ANN as its secondary affiliate (but not ANN's general programming). And by April 1979, they finally joined NNN as its tertiary affiliate (like ANN, TV Miyazaki is not part of NNS, despite participating in the 24 Hour TV charity and airing select variety programs from Nippon TV).

Currently, the news provider (on all days) every morning and primetime (alongside their local news program UMK Super News) comes from FNN, the lunch news bulletin comes from ANN, and the late night news comes from NNN.

Their primetime schedule is also a mix of programs mostly from Nippon TV and Fuji TV, which also leaves no simulcast slots for TV Asahi programming.

Current TV Miyazaki primetime programming layout (since January 2021)
	Monday	Tuesday	Wednesday	Thursday	Friday	Saturday	Sunday
19:00	Fuji TV programming	Local programming	Fuji TV programming		Nippon TV programming	Fuji TV programming	Nippon TV programming
20:00	Fuji TV programming	Nippon TV programming	Fuji TV programming		Nippon TV programming	Fuji TV programming	Nippon TV programming
21:00	TV Asahi programming (Thursday Mystery drama)	Fuji TV / Kansai TV programming	Fuji TV programming		Nippon TV programming	Fuji TV programming	Nippon TV programming
22:00	TV Asahi programming (Thursday Drama)	TV Asahi programming (Wednesday Detective Drama)	Fuji TV programming		Nippon TV programming	Fuji TV programming	Nippon TV programming

Because some programs (mainly TV Asahi programming on all days and certain Nippon TV & Fuji TV programming on specific days) are not simulcasted by the broadcaster, there are currently two ways to watch them:

- Selected programs from Nippon TV (such as Matsuko In The Room) and TV Asahi (such as Welcome Newlyweds) are then aired on its rival broadcaster Miyazaki Broadcasting, or
- Cable operators in Miyazaki Prefecture provide channels from Kagoshima or Kumamoto Prefectures.

== Subsidiaries ==
- FM Miyazaki (JOMU-FM, JFN affiliate)
