= Fukuoka Broadcasting Corporation =

Fukuoka Broadcasting System Corporation
- Logo used since 2000

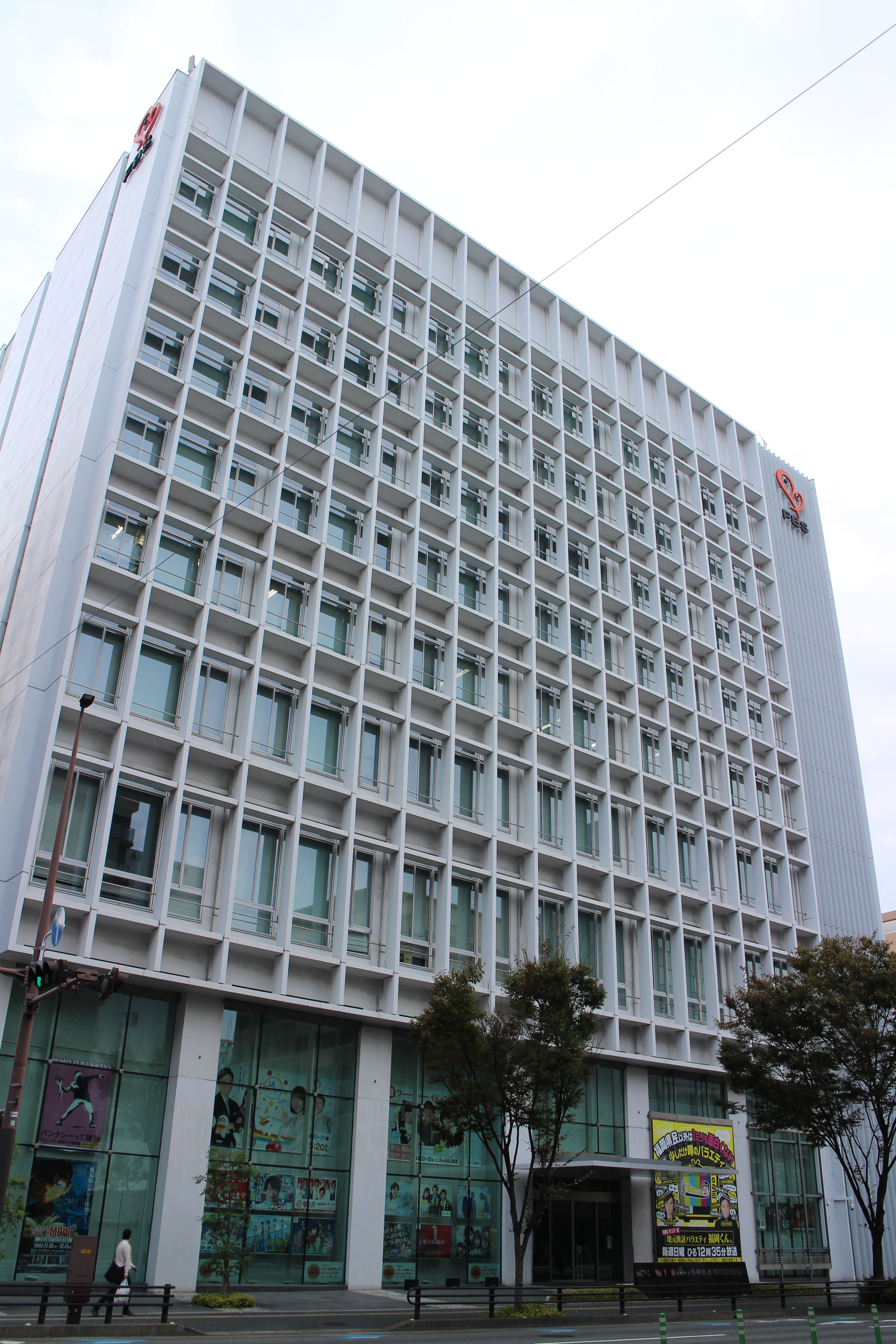
- Headquarters in Chūō-ku, Fukuoka
- Native name: 株式会社福岡放送
- Romanized name: Kabushiki Gaisha Fukuoka Hōsō
- Type: Subsidiary KK
- Industry: Television network
- Founded: May 27, 1968; 58 years ago
- Headquarters: Kiyokawa, Chūō-ku, Fukoka City, Fukuoka Prefecture, Japan
- Owner: Yomiuri Chukyo FS Broadcasting Holdings
- Subsidiaries: FBS Enterprises, Inc.
- Website: fbs.co.jp

JOFH-DTV
- Fukuoka Prefecture; Japan
- City: Fukuoka
- Channels: Digital: 32 (UHF); Virtual: 5
- Branding: Fukuoka Broadcasting; FBS

Programming
- Affiliations: Nippon News Network and Nippon Television Network System

Ownership
- Owner: Fukuoka Broadcasting System Corporation

History
- First air date: April 1, 1969
- Former call signs: JOFH-TV (1969–2011)
- Former channel numbers: 37 (analog UHF, 1969–2011)
- Call sign meaning: Fukuoka Hoso

Technical information
- Licensing authority: MIC

JOFH-DTV (channel 5), branded as Fukuoka Broadcasting (福岡放送, Fukuoka Hōsō; FBS) is a Japanese television station that serves as the affiliate of the Nippon News Network (NNN) and the Nippon Television Network System (NNS) for Fukuoka Prefecture. Based in Fukuoka, the station is owned and operated by Fukuoka Broadcasting System Corporation (株式会社福岡放送, Kabushiki Gaisha Fukuoka Hōsō; FBS), a wholly owned subsidiary of Yomiuri Chukyo FS Broadcasting Holdings. The station also broadcasts in most of the Saga Prefecture.

== History ==
The prefecture's first Nippon Television affiliate was TV Nishinippon, which started broadcasting on August 28, 1958. However, due to the entrance of Yomiuri Shimbun, NTV's main shareholder, into Fukuoka Prefecture in 1964, the station was dissatisfied and opted to leave the network, concentrating on Fuji TV instead. The move devastated NTV, as it considered Fukuoka to be a core city, especially for the Japanese economy, and it urged to open a new affiliate there. In 1966, the Ministry of Posts and Telecommunications opened the UHF band for use in television broadcasting. At the time, eight companies, including Fukuoka Broadcasting System and Kyushu Yomiuri Television (九州読売テレビ) applied for a license. Subsequently, seven companies funded by the local business community of Fukuoka Prefecture were incorporated into Fukuoka Broadcasting. The MPT attempted to integrate Fukuoka Broadcasting and the Kyushu Yomiuri television station, financed by the Yomiuri Shimbun Group, but negotiations between the two parties were stalled for a time. Finally, the Yomiuri Shimbun Group relented and agreed that local Fukuoka companies would have majority ownership and that "Fukuoka Broadcasting" would be used as the company's new name. On April 19, 1968, FBS obtained its preliminary license and was officially established as a company on May 27. The station actively promoted the sale of UHF antennas in order to receive its programming in the year before its launch. Test transmissions started on March 1, 1969, becoming regular on April 1. In September, with the opening of the Yukibashi relay station, the coverage area now included both key cities in the prefecture (Fukuoka and Kitakyushu). In its first year of operation, FBS registered 910 million yen in revenue and only 34 million in losses. In its second year, the revenue was valued at 1.27 billion yen, and the losses at just 16 million.

In April 1971, FBS started producing its local programs in color. Revenue reached 1.433 billion yen with 103 million in profits, without recording losses for the first time. In 1973, FBS held its first dividend payment. The FBS Labor Union was established in the following year. The station's annual income surpassed five billion yen for the first time in 1978. In 1976, it became responsible for the newly launched NNN bureau in Bangkok. Revenue surpassed 6.1 billion yen in 1980 and its viewership share had increased to over 20% for the first time. It was the first TV station in Fukuoka to use teletext services in 1987. During fiscal 1988, revenue surpassed ten billion yen. A satellite news gathering unit was introduced in 1989, improving its news coverage.

On April 23, 1994, FBS aired an 8 1/2-hour broadcast to celebrate its 25th anniversary, achieving 10.7% in ratings. In 1997, FBS aired fewer commercials than in the contract it had signed with advertisers. According to an internal investigation, it aired 2,433 commercials less in the 1989-1996 period. This problem led the station being suspended from NNS and the Japan Private Broadcasting Association. FBS's total compensation to advertisers surpassed 930 million yen, causing a deficit in its financial operations that year. As a result, FBS president Yoshinosuke Sada renounced. The incident led to a loss in revenue worth 12,77 billion yen in 1997, a fall of 15,9% compared to the previous year. However, it did recoup some of its losses because of the high ratings of NTV's networked programs, winning the Triple Crown for the first time that year. The year was also marked with a showing of fresco paintings of Pompeii at the Fukuoka City Arts Museum, attracting more than 195,000 visitors. On April 24, 1999, its thirtieth anniversary special, lasting eight hours and 35 minutes, was shown, attracting a share of 10.8% Between 1997 and 2000, the station achieved the Triple Crown for four years in a row. From 1996 to 2001, it was in charge of NNN's Manila bureau. When it closed, it became in charge of the one in Seoul.。

Its current logo was unveiled in 2000, designed by singer Fumiya Fujii. Ad revenue reached 15,14 billion yen that year alone, the first station in Fukuoka to do so. On July 1, 2006, digital terrestrial broadcasts started alongside RKB, TNC and TVQ. Its initial digital transmitter network covered Fukuoka, Kasuka, Ono and other areas, representing a total of 45%. The NNN LCN is usually fixed at 4, but RKB (whose analog station was channel 4) used it. FBS wanted to use channel 2, but NHK (whose second TV network uses channel 2 nationwide) refused, prompting it to use channel 5 (normally used by ANN, but the KBC station, for reasons similar to RKB, is on channel 1, making NHK G on channel 3) instead. Its profitability was 15,2% in 2011, putting it in first place among all of Japan's commercial TV stations. Its analog signal shut down on July 24, 2011. In 2012, it became the most watched channel in ratings outside of primetime. Later, in 2013 and 2014, it led all-day ratings and outside prime time for two years in a row. In 2017, it obtained the Double Crown for prime time (7-10pm) and golden time (7-11pm) programming.
