= Nippon News Network =

Japanese commercial television network

- Type: Broadcast television network
- Country: Japan
- Availability: Japan (terrestrial, cable and satellite); Worldwide (as a 24-hour YouTube streaming service)
- Founded: April 1, 1966 by Matsutaro Shoriki
- Owner: Nippon Television
- Official website: NNN group networks Nippon TV NEWS 24
- Language: Japanese

Nippon News Network (NNN) is a Japanese commercial television network owned by Nippon Television (NTV), which itself is controlled by The Yomiuri Shimbun Holdings. The network's responsibility includes the syndication of national television news bulletins to its regional affiliates, and news exchange between the stations.

NNN also operates NTV News24, a 24-hour news channel available on subscription television platforms and also aired on select NNN affiliates during overnights.

Distribution of non-news television programmes is handled by Nippon Television Network System (NNS), another network set up by NTV.

== Overview ==
In the early days of the development of commercial terrestrial broadcasting in Japan, the allocation of broadcast frequencies had a major impact on the selection of core bureaus by broadcasters outside the Kanto Region. Therefore, all commercial broadcasters in the Shikoku Region chose to be part of the Nippon TV network while those in Kyushu Region chose to be part of the Japan News Network. After the launch of Nippon TV in 1953, the broadcaster then aired its first proper news bulletins which includes NNN Today's Events (first aired in 1954), NNN News Flash (first aired in 1956), and Nippon Telenews (first aired 1958).

On April 1, 1960, Japan News Network (where Tokyo Broadcasting System is part of) was established, being the first proper commercial group of networks in the country.

NNN was formed on April 1, 1966, centering on Nippon Television (NTV) and Yomiuri Television (ytv).

Osaka Television Broadcasting (OTV, current Asahi Broadcasting Television(ABC)/ANN member), an early network station of NTV, Chubu Nippon Broadcasting (CBC, current CBC Television), Hokkaido Broadcasting (HBC), Radio Kyushu (RKB, current RKB) Mainichi Broadcasting Corporation) received 'Tokyo Telenews' from Radio Tokyo (→ Tokyo Broadcasting, now TBS Television) networked, so there was no network news at NTV until the opening of West Japan Broadcasting (RNC).

When NNN was launched, there were no affiliated stations throughout Kyushu, including Fukuoka Prefecture (At the time NNN was launched, Nippon Television set up a Kyushu branch office in Fukuoka). Also, in the Chukyo area, secondary affiliations continued for a long time (Nagoya TV → Chukyo TV), and it took more time to create a system than JNN and FNN (The first stations in the Sea of Japan area of Tohoku, Toyama, Fukui, Yamanashi, 4 prefectures of Shikoku, Tottori and Yamaguchi are all NNN affiliates).

Kagoshima Yomiuri Television joined in 1994, completing the current system. It consists of 27 full stations and 3 cross-net stations (Fukui Broadcasting as a primary NNN affiliate, NNN secondary, TV Oita as an FNN/NNN station, TV Miyazaki as a triple FNN/NNN/ANN station) for a total of 30 stations, making it the largest in Japan. There are no NNN (NNS) affiliated stations in Saga Prefecture and Okinawa Prefecture. In addition, there are 11 stations operating radio and television simultaneously.

The core stations are Nippon Television, Sapporo Television, Miyagi Television, Chukyo Television, Yomiuri Television, Hiroshima Television, and Fukuoka Broadcasting.

Of the NNN (NNS) affiliated stations, Sapporo Television, Shizuoka Daiichi Television, Chukyo Television, Yomiuri Television, Hiroshima Television, Fukuoka Broadcasting, Nagasaki International Television, and Kumamoto Kenmin Television are affiliated with NTV's broadcasting holding company "Nippon Television Holdings”.

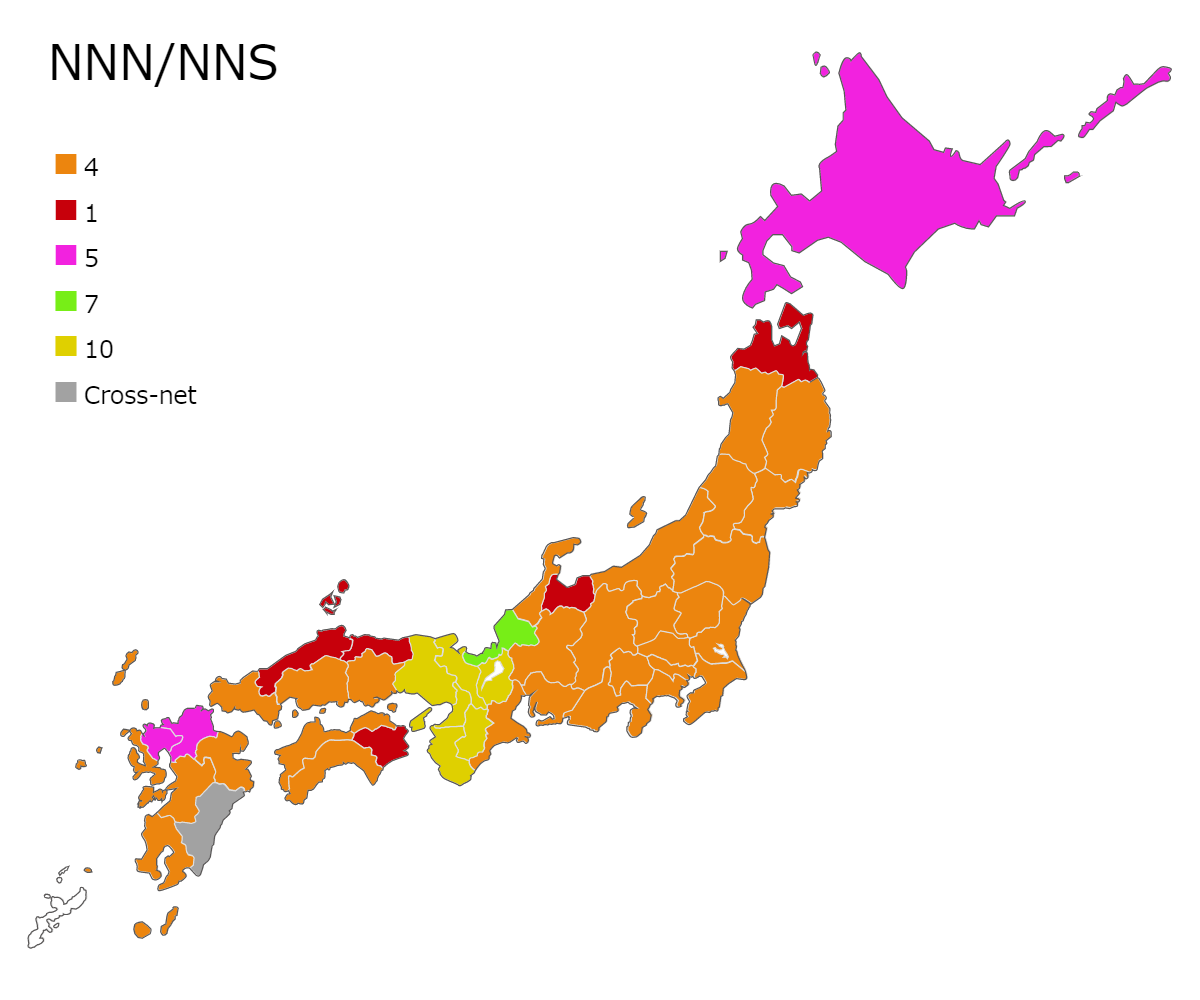
LCN assignments of NNN and NNS affiliates

The common digital terrestrial LCN for select affiliates is often "4" including Nippon Television, with the exception of the following:

- Aomori Broadcasting (RAB), Kitanihon Broadcasting (KNB), Shikoku Broadcasting (JRT), Nihonkai Television (NKT) use "1"
- STV/FBS use "5"
- Fukui Broadcasting (FBC) is "7" (as a dual affiliate of NNN and ANN)
- ytv is "10"

Of the broadcasting stations that do not use "4" for the remote control key ID, except for FBS (analog master station UHF channel 37) and FBC (analog master station VHF channel 11), the transmission channel number of the analog master station was inherited.
