= Kaginado =

2021 Japanese anime television series

- Promotional artwork

かぎなど
- Created by: Key
- Anime television series
- Directed by: Kazuya Sakamoto
- Written by: Takashi Aoshima (chief); Kai; Tohya Okano
- Studio: Liden Films Kyoto Studio
- Licensed by: NA: Crunchyroll; SA/SEA: Muse Communication
- Original network: Tokyo MX, KBS Kyoto, Sun TV, ux, HAB, abn, HTB, BS Nittele, AT-X
- Original run: October 13, 2021 – June 29, 2022
- Episodes: 24

Kaginado (かぎなど; lit. 'Key, etc.') is a Japanese anime television series produced by Liden Films Kyoto Studio. The series aired from October to December 2021. A second season aired from April to June 2022.

== Synopsis ==
Kaginado is a crossover series featuring chibi forms of characters from franchises by Key. These include Kanon, Air, Clannad, Little Busters!, Rewrite, and others.

== Characters ==
| Character | Japanese voice actor |
Kanon
| Yūichi Aizawa | Tomokazu Sugita |
| Ayu Tsukimiya | Yui Horie |
| Nayuki Minase | Mariko Kouda |
| Makoto Sawatari | Mayumi Iizuka |
| Shiori Misaka | Akemi Satō |
| Mai Kawasumi | Yukari Tamura |
| Kaori Misaka | Ayako Kawasumi |
| Sayuri Kurata | Asami Sanada |
| Mishio Amano | Maaya Sakamoto |
| Jun Kitagawa | Tomokazu Seki |
| Akiko Minase | Yūko Minaguchi |
Air
| Yukito Kunisaki | Daisuke Ono |
| Misuzu Kamio | Asami Sanada |
| Kano Kirishima | Sara Takeda |
| Minagi Tōno | Ryoka Yuzuki |
| Haruko Kamio | Aya Hisakawa |
| Michiru | Yukari Tamura |
| Kanna | Chinami Nishimura |
| Ryūya | Nobutoshi Canna |
| Uraha | Kikuko Inoue |
Clannad
| Tomoya Okazaki | Yūichi Nakamura |
| Nagisa Furukawa | Mai Nakahara |
| Ushio Okazaki | Satomi Kōrogi |
| Kyō Fujibayashi | Ryō Hirohashi |
| Ryō Fujibayashi | Akemi Kanda |
| Tomoyo Sakagami | Houko Kuwashima |
| Fūko Ibuki | Ai Nonaka |
| Kotomi Ichinose | Mamiko Noto |
| Yukine Miyazawa | Atsuko Enomoto |
| Yōhei Sunohara | Daisuke Sakaguchi |
| Akio Furukawa | Ryotaro Okiayu |
| Sanae Furukawa | Kikuko Inoue |
| Kouko Ibuki | Yūko Minaguchi |
| Naoyuki Okazaki | Hiroshi Naka |
| Mei Sunohara | Yukari Tamura |
| Yuusuke Yoshino | Hikaru Midorikawa |
| Kappei Hiiragi | Ryoko Shiraishi |
| Misae Sagara | Satsuki Yukino |
Planetarian: The Reverie of a Little Planet
| Yumemi Hoshino | Keiko Suzuki |
| The Junker | Daisuke Ono |
Tomoyo After: It's a Wonderful Life
| Takafumi Sakagami | Keiko Suzuki |
| Kanako | Keiko Suzuki |
Little Busters!
| Riki Naoe | Yui Horie |
| Rin Natsume | Tomoe Tamiyasu |
| Kyōsuke Natsume | Hikaru Midorikawa |
| Masato Inohara | Nobutoshi Canna |
| Kengo Miyazawa | Yūsei Oda |
| Komari Kamikita | Natsumi Yanase |
| Haruka Saigusa | Keiko Suzuki |
| Kudryavka Nōmi | Naomi Wakabayashi |
| Yuiko Kurugaya | Ryōko Tanaka |
| Mio Nishizono | Shiho Kawaragi |
| Kanata Futaki | Keiko Suzuki |
| Sasami Sasasegawa | Sora Tokui |
| Saya Tokido | Harumi Sakurai |
Angel Beats!
| Yuzuru Otonashi | Hiroshi Kamiya |
| Yuri Nakamura | Harumi Sakurai |
| Kanade Tachibana | Kana Hanazawa |
| Hideki Hinata | Ryōhei Kimura |
| Ayato Naoi | Megumi Ogata |
| Yui | Eri Kitamura |
| Takamatsu | Takahiro Mizushima |
| Noda | Shun Takagi |
| Eri Shiina | Fūko Saitō |
| Yusa | Yui Makino |
| Fujimaki | Yūki Masuda |
| TK | Michael Rivas |
| Matsushita | Eiichirō Tokumoto |
| Ooyama | Yumiko Kobayashi |
| Takeyama | Mitsuhiro Ichiki |
| Masami Iwasawa | Miyuki Sawashiro |
| Hisako | Chie Matsuura |
| Miyuki Irie | Kana Asumi |
| Shiori Sekine | Emiri Kato |
Rewrite
| Kotarō Tennōji | Masakazu Morita |
| Kotori Kanbe | Chiwa Saito |
| Chihaya Ōtori | Saya Shinomiya |
| Touka Nishikujou | |
| Sakuya Ōtori | |
| Akane Senri | Eri Kitamura |
| Shizuru Nakatsu | Keiko Suzuki |
| Lucia Konohana | Risa Asaki |
| Kagari | Kana Hanazawa |
| Haruhiko Yoshino | Jun'ichi Yanagida |

== Production and release ==
On November 26, 2019, Key teased on Twitter that it had eight projects in the works for its 21st anniversary. On April 19, 2021, Key held an online event announcing that Kaginado, a crossover anime based on characters from various Key franchises, was in production for an October 2021 release. On September 24, 2021, the official website for Kaginado revealed the staff and cast for the anime. The announcement also revealed that Kazuya Sakamoto would be directing the series at Liden Films Kyoto Studio, with Takashi Aoshima being the chief writer alongside Kai and Tohya Okano as writers. Additionally, the voice actors from prior Key anime reprise their roles, with Asami Sanada voicing Misuzu Kamio due to the death of the original voice actor Tomoko Kawakami in 2011. In Japan, the series aired from October 13 to December 29, 2021, on Tokyo MX, KBS Kyoto, Sun TV, ux, HAB, abn, HTB, BS4, and AT-X. A second season aired from April 13 to June 29, 2022. The series is streaming internationally on Crunchyroll, Funimation, Hidive, Wakanim, Aniplus, bilibili, and Muse Asia. The ending theme song is "Chiisana Kiseki" (ちいさなキセキ; Small Miracle) by Lia.

=== Episode list ===
| No. | Title (Note: Each episode titles contain the word "Etc.", or "Nado" (など, nado) in Japanese.) | Directed by (Note: Information is taken from the ending credits of each episode.) | Written by | Storyboarded by | Original release date |
|---|---|---|---|---|---|
Season 1
| 1 | "The Climax, Etc."; Transliteration: "Kuraimakkusu nado" (Japanese: クライマックスなど) | Kazuya Sakamoto | Takashi Aoshima | Kazuya Sakamoto | October 13, 2021 |
Ushio Okazaki is greeted by Yumemi Hoshino to view a planetarium show. At Private Kaginado Academy, Kotarō Tennōji takes Kotori Kanbe, Chihaya Ōtori, Akane Senri, Shizuru Nakatsu and Lucia Konohana into space within a glowing orb. Kyōsuke Natsume hits a home run and says goodbye with Masato Inohara and Kengo Miyazawa to Riki Naoe, but Rin Natsume gets mad at them for taking so long to disappear, resulting in them fighting over Riki. Nagisa Furukawa receives encouragement from her parents and Tomoya Okazaki, allowing her to sing on stage in the school auditorium. Misuzu Kamio reaches her aunt Haruko Kamio in front of the school's gate, but Misuzu runs into campus when she realizes she is late for school. Ayu Tsukimiya asks Yūichi Aizawa to forget her after she gets arrested for not paying for taiyaki. On the Moon, Kagari waves at Kotarō and the girls as they shoot past the Moon, with the girls shouting at Kotarō for not knowing where they are going.
| 2 | "The Title, Etc."; Transliteration: "Taitoru nado" (Japanese: タイトルなど) | Haruka Saiga | Takashi Aoshima | Kazuya Sakamoto | October 20, 2021 |
Ryō Fujibayashi laments over being bland compared to Mai Kawasumi, Saya Tokido and Kano Kirishima, referring to her fortune-telling ability as akin to being a harbinger of doom. Yōhei Sunohara comes into the classroom on a throne, welcoming the girls into his harem, and threatening to shave the dog Potato bald if they do not comply. Sunohara believes that the title of the series, Kaginado, gives him and others from Clannad precedence. (Note: When written in katakana, Clannad is transliterated as Kuranado (クラナド).) Yuiko Kurugaya bursts through the window and slashes Sunohara with her sword, and explains that the title Kaginado actually translates as Key, etc. in reference to Key.
| 3 | "Club Activities, Etc."; Transliteration: "Bukatsu nado" (Japanese: 部活など) | Kazunari Araki | Kai | Rika Ōta | October 27, 2021 |
Kotarō, Mai, Yuiko and Lucia form the Neo Kendo Club and confront Sunohara about using the soccer field. Sunohara suggests competing with a soccer game to determine who gets to use the field, with Sunohara teaming up with Masato, Kengo and an extremely overweight cat named Dorj. Mai effortlessly steals the soccer ball from Sunohara, passing it to Lucia who shoots for a goal that is blocked by Masato, but his clothes explode because of Lucia's ability to create extreme vibrations in objects she touches. The ball has the same effect on Kengo and Kotarō, with the latter using his Rewrite ability to be able to withstand the ball's vibrations, shooting for another goal that is again blocked by Masato, Kengo and Sunohara whose clothes also explode. Kanata Futaki and Shizuru halt the game and suspend the Soccer Club for indecent exposure. In the Literature Club, Mio Nishizono gets a nosebleed from witnessing the soccer game.
| 4 | "Swimwear, Etc."; Transliteration: "Mizugi nado" (Japanese: 水着など) | Kazunari Araki | Kai | Rika Ōta | November 3, 2021 |
The students gather at the pool for gym class, with the boys mainly admiring the girls in their school swimsuits. Sasami Sasasegawa and Kudryavka Nōmi openly wonder why they are depicted differently than other girls, with Yūichi pointing out that it is because of Sasami's and Kudryavka's small breasts. Riki is accidentally splashed with water, also giving him a non-chibi appearance, prompting other girls to strike provocative poses. Sasami and Kudryavka do likewise, but to no avail, and they lament that even Riki can appear more tantalizing than they do.
| 5 | "Holiday, Etc."; Transliteration: "Kyūjitsu nado" (Japanese: 休日など) | Haruka Saiga | Kai | Keisuke Maeda; Kazuya Sakamoto | November 10, 2021 |
At a flea market, Yukito Kunisaki tries to perform a magical puppet show for money, but no one pays him any attention. Yukito walks around the market, observing that others are profiting by selling bread, doing fortune-telling, and even selling earplugs to shut out Kotomi Ichinose's terrible violin performance. Yukito challenges Kotori in an attempt to take over her spot and audience. When Yukito uses his puppet to attack, it is quickly shot at and ripped apart with a chainsaw by Kotori's parents, now controlled by her as familiars. Ayu runs through with a bag of taiyaki and stomps on the puppet, sending it flying. Kotori earns a lot of money and cheers for her win as Yukito muses about becoming a crow.
| 6 | "Little Sisters, Etc."; Transliteration: "Imōto nado" (Japanese: 妹など) | Kazunari Araki | Kai | Shinsuke Nakano | November 17, 2021 |
Kouko Ibuki invites older brothers and sisters to discuss their younger sisters, which includes: Kyōsuke, Sakuya Ohtori, Shizuru, Kaori Misaka, Mio, Tomoyo Sakagami, Sunohara, Kyou and Kanata. Kyou and Kanata talk about how cute their twin sisters are, with Mio pointing out their inherent narcissism. When Haruka Saigusa and Ryou are interviewed, they reveal how their sisters Kanata and Kyou had once masqueraded as them in an attempt to kiss a boy. Shiori Misaka reveals in an interview that Kaori had previously refused to acknowledge her sister's existence, delivering a deathblow to Kaori. Sunohara says it is normal to get angry at someone who makes their sister cry, shocking the others because of his reasoning, with Kyōsuke and Sakuya wanting their sisters to desperately be closer to them. Kaori, Kyou, Tomoyo and Kanata cannot agree who loves their sister more or whose sister is the best, and Kyousuke correctly guesses that the only way to determine how strong their emotions are towards their sisters will be in a baseball game.
| 7 | "Charades, Etc."; Transliteration: "Chaban nado" (Japanese: 茶番など) | Haruka Saiga | Kai | Haruka Saiga | November 24, 2021 |
Each younger sister pitches a baseball to their sibling to show how strong their bond for each other is with a home run. Ryou, Haruka and Shiori all throw fastballs into their sisters' midsections for past grudges. Rin throws a fastball into Kyōsuke's crotch, and the same happens to Sakuya, although he jumps into it himself as an apology to Chihaya. Mei gets disgusted with Sunohara and does not pitch. Lastly, Tomoyo's brother Takufumi Sakagami stands in for her sister Tomo Mishima by dressing in Tomo's clothes. Tomoyo kicks the baseball he lobs back at him, sending him flying. Afterward, Kouko claims victory in the competition because she delayed her marriage for her sister Fūko Ibuki.
| 8 | "Soulmates, Etc."; Transliteration: "Sōrumeito nado" (Japanese: ソウルメイトなど) | Ryūhei Aoyagi | Tōya Okano | Ryūhei Aoyagi | December 1, 2021 |
Kanako finds a crystal ball in the trash and sets up a fortune-telling stall outside the school entrance. Kanata and Shizuru go to investigate, telling Shizuru that she will grow to be a beautiful woman, and that Kanata will find her soulmate. Haruka overhears this, saying she is no longer mad at Kanata and that they are soulmates. Kanako points out how similar their voices sound, referring to all of them being voiced by Keiko Suzuki. Kanako manages to run away and she muses to Takafumi about all the money she earned today. Kanata appears suddenly, taking the crystal ball and asking it who is her soulmate. The crystal ball shows her several people–Yumemi, Kanako, Shizuru, and Takafumi–causing Kanata to throw it away in frustration before it settles on Haruka, and she runs after it in desperation. Back in the planetarium, Yumemi hopes that these soul sisters will live happily ever after.
| 9 | "Protagonists, Etc."; Transliteration: "Shujinkō nado" (Japanese: 主人公など) | Daiki Handa | Kai | Daiki Handa | December 8, 2021 |
Yūichi, Yukito, Tomoya, Riki and Kotarō gather at school to discuss what it means to be a protagonist. Riki starts the discussion about their thoughts on girls with weird speech habits, followed by the others berating Yukito for getting intimate with younger girls, except for Kotarō who now does not want to admit that he himself is almost 30. Next, Kotarō asks how much experience they have each had with girls, with Yūichi, Yukito and Kotarō jealous that Riki personally knows so many girls. Tomoya wonders openly about how their romances often have such cruel endings, with Riki even adding Kyōsuke's parting words to him. Yūichi adjourns the meeting for now, and he takes one last look back before closing the door.
| 10 | "Carnival Preparations, Etc."; Transliteration: "Gakuensai no Junbi nado" (Japanese: 学園祭の準備など) | Kazunari Araki | Takashi Aoshima | Shinsuke Nakano | December 15, 2021 |
Toshio Koumura and Sougen Esaka watch over the students as they prepare for the school festival, with Akiko Minase annoyed that she has been grouped with them. To placate her, Toshio gives Akiko a school uniform to wear, and her daughter Nayuki runs after her, mortified. In the art room, Ayu, Fūko and Shizuru carve aquatic animals from wood, but they cannot agree on which one is best. In an abandoned classroom, Kyōsuke, Sunohara and Yuiko discuss the upcoming beauty contest, with Kyōsuke offering Shimako, Mei, Kudryavka and Michiru as contestants. While Sunohara yells at him about this, Yuiko secretly takes Shimako's picture, and Mio replaces Sunohara's written proposal with one of her own. As the sun is setting, Yūichi tries to cheer Nayuki up, but she gets depressed again when she sees her mother still in the school uniform.
| 11 | "Day of the Carnival, Etc."; Transliteration: "Gakuensai Honban nado" (Japanese: 学園祭本番など) | Haruka Saiga | Takashi Aoshima | Kazuya Sakamoto | December 22, 2021 |
Kanna, Ryūya and Uraha go around exploring the school festival. In one classroom, Ayu, Fūko and Shizuru reconcile their differences about their favorite aquatic animals. In another classroom, a cafe is set up where spectators can watch Sayuri Kurata, Minagi Tōno, Michiru, Yukine Miyazawa and Komari Kamikita drink coffee, eat cake and chat. Ryūya witnesses Saya being led away for using live ammo in a shooting gallery. Midow tries to take over the festival, but his earth dragon somehow got mixed up with Misuzu in a dinosaur costume. Tomoyo, dressed in a full body bear suit, easily defeats him. Afterward, Kanna and Misuzu become fast friends as Ryūya and Uraha tearfully watch over them.
| 12 | "The School Carnival Ends, and Then... Etc."; Transliteration: "Gakuensai Shūryō, Soshite――nado" (Japanese: 学園祭終了、そして――など) | Kōji Aritomi | Takashi Aoshima | Kazuya Sakamoto | December 29, 2021 |
On the final day of the school festival, a beauty contest is held using the proposal Mio had switched with Sunohara's, resulting in Jun, Ryūya, Sunohara, Kyōsuke and Haruhiko Yoshino as the contestants dressed in their schools' respective female school uniforms. Unlike the dismay from the others, Kyōsuke is enthusiastic about it and aims to win. Masato and Kengo also cross-dress, angered that they were not chosen as being the representative of the "protagonist's best friend" instead of Kyōsuke. Mio explains that if it had been conducted with the protagonists instead, Riki would obviously have won, prompting Yūichi and Tomoya to try to show Riki up, resulting in all three also cross-dressing. In the end, the winner is announced to be Hideki Hinata. The MC of the contest removes her disguise, revealing herself to be Yuri Nakamura, and she declares that they are going to destroy the world.
Season 2
| 13 | "Before the Second Half Begins, Etc."; Transliteration: "Kōhan Sen Sutāto no Mae ni nado" (Japanese: 後半戦スタートーーの前になど) | Kazuya Sakamoto | Takashi Aoshima | Kazuya Sakamoto | April 13, 2022 |
The episode recaps back on Afterlife Battlefront (SSS) forces crashing the school festival on the last episode before suddenly pans to a certain space, where Kashima Sakura and Kirishima Hijiri presides over presence of Kotarou, Mio, Sunohara, Yukito and Yuiichi to complain on them appearing too much in the last season. They also brought up issues where some characters barely got any lines on the last season, although also mentions those willing to stay as narrations and give exception to Shizuku, the most appearing character for the last season for her because they can accept her cuteness. While both trying to impose appearance restraints to those characters, Kappei Hiiragi, a character from Clannad that never appeared in the anime series makes his introduction and laments about all the complaints about his appearance and routes all this time. All characters knowing this apologized to him, and he later states that next episode will be the real beginning of Kaginado's second season but reluctant to say if he will make further appearance or not.
| 14 | "Academy in the Afterlife, Etc."; Transliteration: "Shigo no Gakuen nado" (Japanese: 死後の学園など) | Kazunari Araki | Takashi Aoshima | Shinsuke Nakano | April 20, 2022 |
The protagonists on the stage question the SSS motive of crashing the school festival. Yuri introduces her and SSS, before this disguised as Darkness Executive observing the academy and decided that this world is too convenient and concludes that it is an afterlife created by God. Fuko and Ayu opposes the statement as they are not actually dead but raises possibility of those if the MC don't help them. Then many characters started to bring up their death or near-death moments in their original series. While Riki complains on those fact, Kyousuke states all characters in their series survived so that is not an afterlife for them. Kotarou brought up Kagari's purpose of world destructions as well. As the debate about being in an afterlife heated, Noda appears panicked to tell Yuri the SSS forces are enjoying the school festival instead of sabotaging them. Yuri ordered them to withdraw. Yuri briefed SSS the next day in the base on their objective to destroy this world and God as well.
| 15 | "Mascots, Etc."; Transliteration: "Masukotto nado" (Japanese: マスコットなど) | Kazuya Sakamoto | Kai | Taketomo Ishikawa | April 27, 2022 |
On briefing the SSS, Yuri brought up suggestion to catch each series mascots or pets to bait God appearance, with Potato in her hand. Each of them later moves to catch the mascot. Hinata and Otonashi chases Chibimoth before Yuri caught it, Noda and Matsushita fights angry Rin to catch Dorj, Fujimaki and Ooyama had to deal with Fujibayashi twins fierce attacks before they can catch Botan, while Takamatsu with Piro in his hand met Masato and had a muscle showdown. Upon reassembling, the mascots are gathered, but Matsushita appears with Kudrayavka as his "pet" instead of Dorj, raising the squad eyebrows. While Yuri thinking if it really can bring out God or not, Angel crashes into their base while eating mapo tofu and bombs them away with Mapo Skill.
| 16 | "Trauma, Etc."; Transliteration: "Torauma nado" (Japanese: トラウマなど) | Haruka Saiga | Kai | Hayato Sakoda | May 4, 2022 |
Kaginado academy students are going to the beach for the summer trip. Yukine tries to help Fuko's motion sickness by teaching her spells, and Kotomi seems struggling with that also. In the next bus Ayu and Nayuki are singing, and Kotarou then brought up his idol group proposal to Lucia and Chihaya. Akio is driving one of the buses before remembered that he once got stabbed while driving bus before, so Sanae tried to calm him, but the bus ends up moving unstably causing panic upon Little Busters members as they had an experience with bus accident. SSS which also follows the trip tried to hijack the bus, but Otonashi team was halted by his trauma of being in a tunnel, and Yuri team, trying to threaten another bus with firearms was stopped by Rewrite casts which had weapons and superpowers.
| 17 | "The Beach, Etc."; Transliteration: "Umi nado" (Japanese: うみなど) | Haruka Saiga | Kai | Haruka Saiga | May 11, 2022 |
The casts are having fun at the beach, with exception of some SSS members which was buried in the sand as a punishment of them creating ruckus. Some are playing volleyball, some are eating, and some just want to relax. Sunohara and Kitagawa who are serving the girls tried the water splash tricks on Kaoru and Akane to reveal their "womanly" form and some characters had their "true form" shown as well. Kud and Sasami, failed to do this in the pool before were inspired to try showing them but failed, thinking it might be caused by their flat chests. They are demotivated further after seeing Kanade, whose chests is also flat, gains her form as well. On the way back, Imamiya checks his camera for best shot of the girls in the trip, before got caught by Nishikujou.
| 18 | "Music Festival, Etc."; Transliteration: "Utagassen nado" (Japanese: 歌合戦など) | Kazunari Araki | Tōya Okano | Shinsuke Nakano | May 18, 2022 |
Yuri organized a music festival in the academy, believing it would certainly bait God to appear. Kotarou and Yoshino win against Sunohara and Tomoya in a hip-hop duel, Luchihaya idol duo beats Kud in the idol show off, and Girls Dead Monster win against Little Busters in the battle of the bands although Iwasawa deciding to sing My Song nearly obliterates her. When the battle of the legends started, Yoshino Yuusuke starting was disrupted by appearance of another legend, which was actually Dorj (voiced by Lia) singing "Tori no Uta", and the performance ended up touches the heart a lot of audience in the hall.
| 19 | "The Strongest, Etc."; Transliteration: "Saikyō nado" (Japanese: 最強など) | Daiki Handa | Kai | Hayato Sakoda | May 25, 2022 |
Key1 Grand Prix is held in the academy to determine who is the strongest character with Kashima Sakura and Ooyama presenting the event and Kagari and Angel become the commentator. First round saw Mai beats Sakuya badly with her sword, which made Chihaya lose her fight. Second round is Kannabi no Mikoto against Kengo but ended abruptly after Kanna strips herself on the arena before flying around, arousing Kengo and other spectators and made her got disqualified. In another round Kotomi uses her violin skills to beat down Matsushima but ended up causing damage to the entire arena including the plate of mapo tofu Angel was eating, causing Angel's wrath and triggers her Harmonics skill. Angel ended up declared as the winner of the tournament due to the casualties caused by her, but she feels hollow because she can't enjoy her mapo tofu anymore.
| 20 | "Heroines, Etc."; Transliteration: "Hiroin nado" (Japanese: ヒロインなど) | Kōji Aritomi | Kai | Kazuya Sakamoto | June 1, 2022 |
Two pajama parties was happening in the girl's dormitory, one being the main heroine including Riki, talking happily about their encounter with the protagonist, the experience of them living together and their final fate and another being the "second-place heroines", complaining about how they were falsely advertised or appearing like the main one and how they should be the chosen one. Riki later realized he is not a heroine but got mistaken as one and tried to leave, but Kagari insisted he should stay for research purpose on why he has the most intimacy record in the whole Key franchises with other being curious. Later in the Protagonist Convention, Riki told the other protagonist they should forget about "the secret garden" aka the incident in the pajamas party.
| 21 | "The Student Council President Is a God, Etc."; Transliteration: "Seito Kaichō wa Kami nado" (Japanese: 生徒会長は神など) | Takana Shirai | Takashi Aoshima | Takana Shirai | June 8, 2022 |
The Student Council President election commences, and Yuri is interested of being one so she can claim the "godly powers" of it. However, the campaign already started with Kitagawa campaigning for the bland character's fate alongside Ooyama, Matsushita campaigning for Tohno in exchange for foods, Takamatsu supporting Tomoyo with eyeglasses believing a school council president should wear one and Sasami and Kud campaigning together to fight for equality of flat-chested girls that causes Midou abandoning his candidature but got ditched by Yui instead. Yuri seeing many SSS comrades having fun with others causing jealousy to her, but decided to step up her fight
| 22 | "Confusion in the Student Council Presidential Election, Etc."; Transliteration: "Konmei no Seito Kaichō Senkyo nado" (Japanese: 混迷の生徒会長選挙など) | Haruka Saiga | Takashi Aoshima | Takana Shirai | June 15, 2022 |
The list of student council president candidate grows larger with others joining the race, like Kaori which want to defeat Kitagawa, Kano whose candidature put by Hijiri, Fuko that has no idea what it is and others like Akane, Midori and Mei. Asked on Yuri's current progress however, apparently, she is detained after her dirty plan was sabotaged by the other comrades and detained in the self-examination room with Ayu who is caught stealing taiyaki again. After Yuri was released, she found herself lonely, but not for long as the "second-place heroines" came to her support. In the other hand, Ayato Naoi who was the mastermind of the sabotage got beaten by Angel who wants to keep Otonashi away from him.
| 23 | "Cast My Vote for You, Etc."; Transliteration: "Kiyoki Ippyō o Kimi ni......nado" (Japanese: 清き一票を君に……など) | Kazunari Araki | Takashi Aoshima | Kazuya Sakamoto | June 22, 2022 |
Yuri, with the "loser heroines" discussed about their plans and somehow ended up reflecting all her moment together with others and caught by surprise with SSS comrades coming back as they are just away hunting backstabbers of their gang. Being back to her usual spirit, she campaigns actively until the voting moment with others, although the candidate list goes even bigger later on that nobody can even track on it. During the result announcement, the fact that the election ends up on a draw between all candidates makes the students confused, but not for long as they found Ayu, who was just released from detention and had not cast her vote yet. They chase her as far as Torishirojima just to get her to vote.
| 24 | "The Shape of a Miracle... Etc."; Transliteration: "Kiseki no Katachi......nado" (Japanese: 奇跡のカタチ……など) | Kazuya Sakamoto | Takashi Aoshima | Kazuya Sakamoto | June 29, 2022 |
Election season is over and the school finally gets a student council president. The protagonists reflected on how the world they are living makes them understand each other and enjoy together, and later meet with other characters which was already in the school, especially the main heroines that is waiting for them. Later Yukito who thought that he would reach his popular times got distraught by the question by Yuiichi of following them to school despite already an adult and coughed blood, and Kotarou, realizing his true identity is in danger, had a panic attack. The scene switched to the planetarium hall, where Ushio is watching the story of them from the beginning and Hoshino Yumemi is presenting it. Ushio is not happy the show ends, but Yumemi convinces her that the show is not over as someone continues to love that world. Later Ushio leaves the hall as her parents Tomoya and Nagisa pick her up and she waves goodbye to Yumemi. The Junker later appears and compliments Yumemi on her performance and gets her and Miss Jena ready for another presentation of the world.

== See also ==
- Isekai Quartet, a similar crossover anime featuring characters from series published by Kadokawa
