= Iwate Asahi Television =

JOIY-DTV

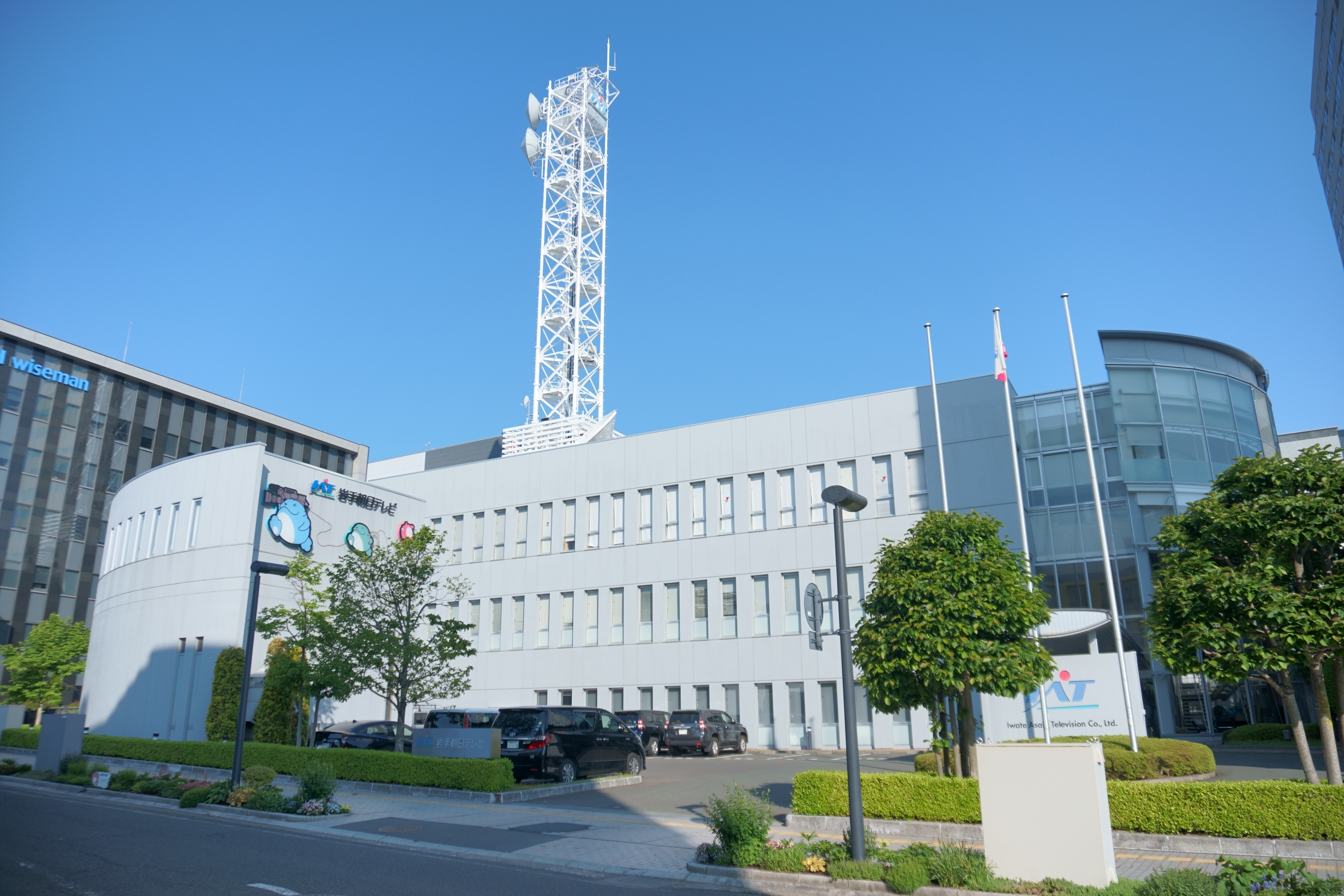
- Iwate Asahi Television HQ
- Iwate Prefecture; Japan
- City: Morioka
- Channels: Digital: 22 (UHF); Virtual: 5
- Branding: IAT

Programming
- Language: Japanese
- Affiliations: All-Nippon News Network

Ownership
- Owner: Iwate Asahi Television Co., Ltd.

History
- Founded: June 21, 1995
- First air date: October 1, 1996
- Former call signs: JOIY-TV (1996-2012)
- Former channel numbers: Analog: 31 (UHF, 1996–2012)
- Call sign meaning: Disambiguation of JOII-DTV (which IAT replaced at sign-on) or Iwate Asahi(Y)

Technical information
- Licensing authority: MIC

Links
- Website: www.iat.co.jp

Iwate Asahi Television Co., Ltd. (株式会社岩手朝日テレビ, Kabushiki-gaisha Iwate Asahi Terebi), also known as IAT callsigns JOIY-DTV (channel 5), is a Japanese broadcast network affiliated with the All-Nippon News Network. Their headquarters are located in Morioka, Iwate Prefecture.

== History ==
A license to operate a fourth television station in Iwate Prefecture was established on 19 June 1995. The company that was awarded that license, known as Iwate Asahi Television (founded 21 June 1995), began construction on the station a month later. JOIY-TV began operations on 1 October 1996, seven days after conducting its first transmission tests. Before the station began operations, Iwate Prefecture was the only area of northeastern Japan that lacked a full affiliate of the All-Nippon News Network (ANN, which in general is an affiliation with TV Asahi). JODF-TV and JOII-TV functioned as secondary affiliates of ANN (formerly NET) between the early 1970s and the fall of 1996. The Asahi network's full schedule was available on some local cable television providers via JOEM-TV (from Sendai), which was receivable over the air in portions of the prefecture's southern areas.

Digital terrestrial television broadcasts commenced on 1 October 2006, and analog broadcasts were expected to continue until 24 July 2011. The 11 March 2011 earthquake resulted in an indefinite postponement of the shutdown of all analog broadcasts across Iwate, Miyagi, and Fukushima prefectures. JOIY-TV finally shut down its analog signal on 31 March 2012 shortly before 0:00 JST, with regular programming having ended twelve hours earlier.
