= Oita Broadcasting System =

Oita Broadcasting System, Inc.
- Logo used since 2010

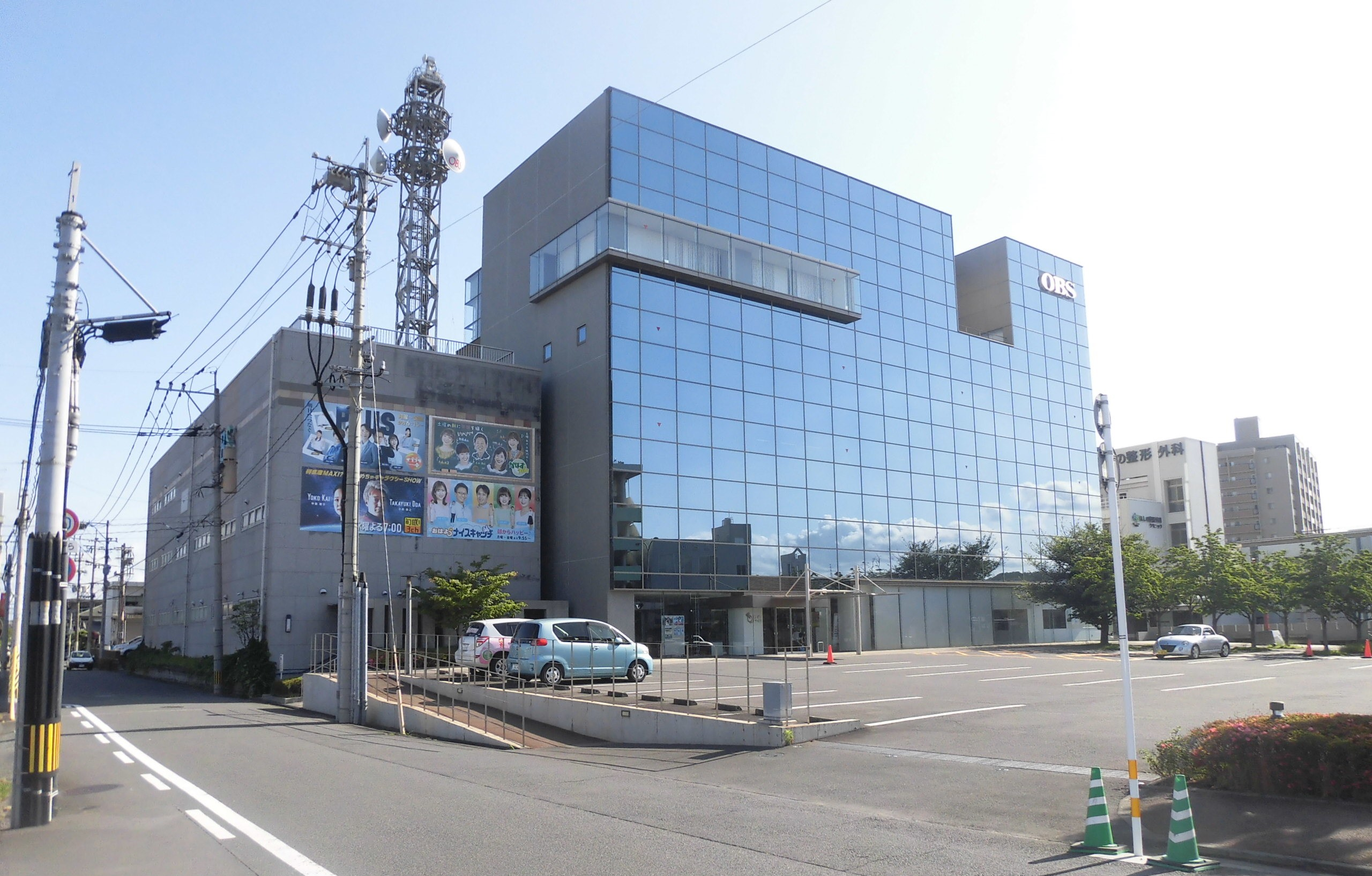
- Headquarters in Imazuru, Oita
- Trade name: OBS
- Native name: 株式会社大分放送
- Romanized name: Kabushikigaisha ōitahōsō
- Type: Kabushiki kaisha
- Industry: Television network
- Founded: October 1, 1953; 73 years ago
- Headquarters: 3-1-1 Imazuru, Oita City, Oita Prefecture, Japan
- Website: obs-oita.co.jp
- Footnotes; Data from its Company Profile

JOGF
- Oita; Japan
- Broadcast area: Oita Prefecture
- Frequencies: 1098 kHz (AM); 93.3 MHz (FM)
- Branding: OBS Radio

Programming
- Language: Japanese
- Format: Talk, Sports
- Affiliations: JRN/NRN

Ownership
- Owner: Oita Broadcasting System, Inc.

History
- First air date: October 1, 1953

Technical information
- Licensing authority: MIC

Links
- Website: obs-oita.co.jp/radio/

JOGF-DTV
- Oita Prefecture; Japan
- City: Oita
- Channels: Digital: 22 (VHF); Virtual: 3
- Branding: OBS Television

Programming
- Affiliations: Japan News Network

Ownership
- Owner: Oita Broadcasting System, Inc.

History
- First air date: October 1, 1959
- Former call signs: JOGF-TV (1959–2011)
- Former channel numbers: 5 (analog VHF, 1959–2011)

Technical information
- Licensing authority: MIC

Links
- Website: www.obs-oita.co.jp/tv/

Oita Broadcasting System, Inc. (株式会社大分放送, Kabushiki-Gaisha Ōita Hōsō) or OBS is a television company based in Ōita Prefecture, Japan. It is affiliated with the Japan News Network for television, and a dual JRN/NRN affiliate for radio. Oita Broadcasting is one of the few JNN affiliates who are airing programs on virtual channel "3", which also include the likes of RKK Kumamoto Broadcasting, and Ryukyu Broadcasting.

== History ==
After the "Three Radio Laws" ("Radio Law", "Broadcasting Law", "Radio Wave Supervision Commission Establishment Law") were passed in 1950, the Radio Supervision Commission adhered to the principle of "one prefecture, one station" and issued licenses for 16 radio stations in 14 regions of Japan. There is also a movement to establish private broadcasting in Oita Prefecture, centered on the Oita Contract News Agency. In February 1953, Oita Prefectural government and financial circles, led by Oita Contract News Agency, held a "Preparatory Meeting for the Establishment of Radio Oita" and submitted an application for a broadcasting license to the Ministry of Posts and Communications. On July 15 of the same year, Radio Oita (ラジオ大分, Rajio Ōita) held a founding general meeting, and the registration was completed on July 20. At the same time, Oita Radio purchased land in Takamatsu, Oita City and built its headquarters building. After obtaining a preliminary license on August 14, Oita Radio began trial broadcasting on September 20.

On July 20, Radio Oita was officially established and began broadcasting radio programs at 5:30 a.m. on October 1 of the same year, becoming the 23rd private radio station in Japan and the third private radio station in Kyushu. In the first half year of broadcasting, Oita Radio achieved profitability. In 1956, Oita Radio Nakatsu City established a broadcasting bureau, so that northern Oita Prefecture could also begin to listen to Oita Radio's programs.

In February 1956, Radio Oita applied for a television broadcasting license. In order to meet the hardware conditions required for broadcasting television, Oita Radio purchased land in Imazu, Oita City, to build a new headquarters. The building is two stories high with a total floor area of 2,310 square meters. On October 22 of the same year, Oita Radio received a television broadcast license. On September 17, 1959, Radio Oita Television began trial broadcasting. At 11:54 on October 1, Radio Oita officially started regular TV broadcasts. At the same time as the broadcast, Oita Radio and Television decided to join the JNN network to reduce program and news deployment costs and strengthen competitiveness. In the early days of broadcasting, Oita Radio broadcast 5 hours of TV programs every day. In addition to programs from Radio Tokyo, it also broadcast a small number of programs from Nihon Educational Television and Nippon Television. As television sales quickly exceeded those of radio, Radio Oita changed its company name to Oita Broadcasting in 1961. Oita Broadcasting built five employee residences from the late 1950s to the mid-1960s to improve employee welfare levels.

In the early 1960s, Oita Broadcasting opened broadcast stations in Saeki, Tsukumi, Takeda and other places, and extended the daily TV broadcast time. According to Oita Prefecture's first ratings survey in 1960, Oita Broadcasting achieved a 70% share in prime time, gaining an overwhelming ratings advantage over NHK. However, while TV advertising revenue increased rapidly, Oita Broadcasting's broadcasting revenue declined. In 1966, Oita Broadcasting fully broadcast the 21st National Sports Festival. Starting from the next year, Oita Broadcasting and other JNN franchise stations in Kyushu jointly produced the documentary program "Kyushu Rediscovered". This tradition of jointly producing documentaries by JNN franchise stations in the Kyushu region continues to this day. In 1965, Oita Broadcasting built an employee union hall in the headquarters. Two years later, the headquarters was expanded and improved. working environment.

In October 1966, Oita Broadcasting began broadcasting color TV programs. In 1969, Oita Broadcasting's new building was completed, equipped with Studio A with an area of 270 square meters, which greatly improved Oita Broadcasting's TV program production environment. The next year, Oita Broadcasting Television achieved uninterrupted broadcasting of TV programs throughout the day, and 100% of prime time programs were in color. In 1970, with the launch of Television Oita System (TOS), Oita Broadcasting entered the era of competition. In response, Oita Broadcasting began to enter the housing and other industries to develop income other than advertising. In 1972, Oita Broadcasting went to Brazil to shoot a documentary, which was Oita Broadcasting's first overseas filming. Oita Broadcasting began to implement the two-day weekend system in 1976, and was the first broadcasting company in Oita Prefecture to implement the system. In 1977, Oita Broadcasting introduced the Electronic News Gathering (ENG) system, which made news gathering editors The efficiency is greatly improved.

In 1989, Oita Broadcasting introduced satellite news broadcasting (SNG system), and began broadcasting stereo TV programs in July of the same year. Oita Broadcasting built a reporting center building from 1990 to 1991, and built a new news studio with an area of about 100 square meters. Oita Broadcasting continued to strengthen its internationalization in the 1990s and signed a sister station agreement with the American TV station KHOU in 1992. However, in the early 1990s, due to the impact of the launch of Oita Asahi Broadcasting (OAB), the third private TV station in Oita Prefecture, Oita Broadcasting's ratings dropped significantly. In 1996, Oita Broadcasting opened its official website.

In order to adapt to the equipment needs of the digital TV era, Oita Broadcasting decided to build a new headquarters building on the current site of the headquarters in 2000, and construction started in 2003 In March 2008, Oita Broadcasting's new headquarters was completed. The total floor area is 3,212.4 square meters. On December 1, 2006, Oita Broadcasting began broadcasting digital TV signals, and stopped broadcasting analog TV on July 24, 2011.
