= Miyagi Television Broadcasting =

JOMM-DTV
- Logo used since 2010

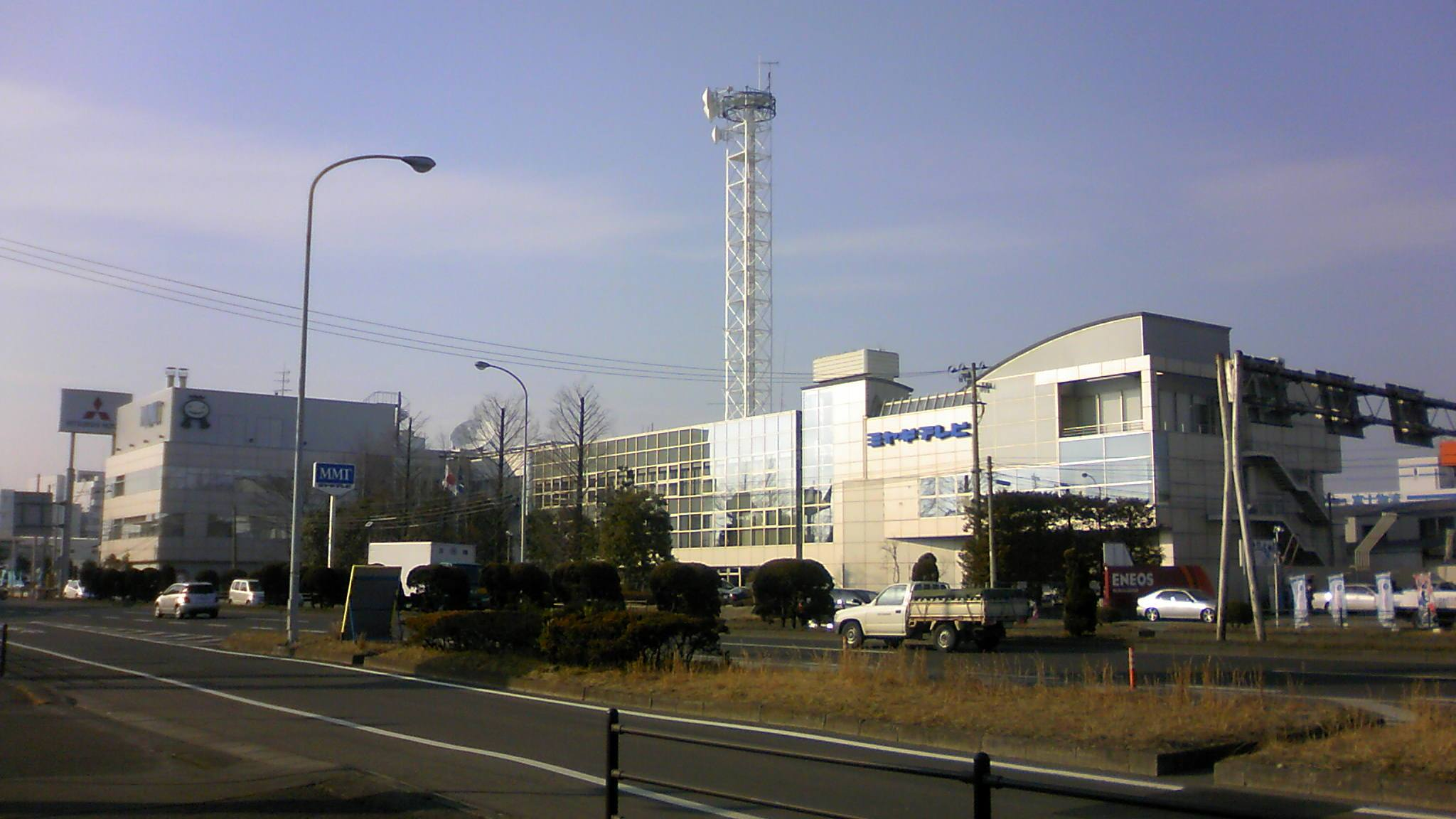
- Headquarters in Miyagino-ku, Sendai
- Miyagi Prefecture; Japan
- City: Sendai
- Channels: Digital: 24 (UHF); Virtual: 4
- Branding: Miyagi TV; Miyatele

Programming
- Language: Japanese
- Affiliations: Nippon News Network and Nippon Television Network System

Ownership
- Owner: Miyagi Television Broadcasting Co., Ltd.

History
- First air date: October 1, 1970
- Former call signs: JOMM-TV (1970–2012)
- Former channel numbers: 34 (analog UHF, 1970–2012)
- Former affiliations: ANN (secondary, 1970–1975)
- Call sign meaning: MM34 (former branding)

Technical information
- Licensing authority: MIC

Links
- Website: www.mmt-tv.co.jp

Corporate information
- Native name: 株式会社宮城テレビ放送
- Romanized name: Kabushikigaisha Miyagiterebihōsō
- Type: Kabushiki gaisha
- Industry: Television broadcasting
- Founded: January 17, 1970; 56 years ago
- Headquarters: 1-5-33 Hinodecho, Miyagino Ward, Sendai City, Miyagi Prefecture, Japan
- Key people: Katsuya Yamada (president)
- Owner: Kamei (20%); Nippon Television Holdings (10.7%)
- Number of employees: 103 (2025)
- Footnotes; Data from its company profile

Miyagi Television Broadcasting (宮城テレビ放送, Miyagiterebihōsō) is the Nippon TV station (NNN and NNS) for Sendai. The channel is branded as Miyatele (ミヤテレ, Miyatere). It opened in 1970 as the third commercial station in Miyagi Prefecture. It was a combination of Nippon Television and NET (now TV Asahi). In 1975, after the opening of TV Asahi affiliate commercial station in the Miyagi Prefecture, it became the dominant station of Nippon Television in the Tohoku region.

In 2015, it celebrated its 20 year anniversary of OH! Bandes. Miyagi is known for producing in-house programs such as Miya TV Stadium, and other programs broadcast nationwide, securing its position as a TV station with strong local roots.

== Capital composition ==
As of March 31, 2016:

Capital	Total number of shares
300 million yen	600,000 shares

Capital	Number of shares	Percentage
Kamei Corporation	135,000 shares	22.50%
Yomiuri Shimbun Publishing Company	120,000 shares	20.00%
Nippon Television Kobato Cultural Foundation	108,000 shares	18.00%
Nippon Television	64,000 shares	10.66%
Miyagi Prefectural Government	60,000 shares	10.00%
Fumiyuki Kamei (Kamei Corporation CEO)	48,000 shares	8.00%

== History ==
In 1967, the Ministry of Posts and Telecommunications issued eighteen UHF television licenses, which motivated the government of Miyagi Prefecture to establish a plan for a third commercial television station, attracting 59 companies. Under the coordination of then-governor of Miyagi, Soichiro Yamamoto, these bids were merged into one, forming Miyagi Television Broadcasting. It obtained its license on November 21, 1969 and held its founding general meeting on January 13, 1970. In March 1970, it acquired a plot of land in the Kutake area of Sendai to build its headquarters, construction for which finished on September 29. At the time, most people only had a VHF-only television set; much like other UHF upstarts of the time, it initiated a campaign to promote UHF sets and antennas. The station was initially known as MTB, though the name changed in 1975 to mm34 (based on the station's callsign: JOMM-TV, and the UHF frequency, channel 34).

The station launched at 6:40am on October 1, 1970, the first program being an ANN News bulletin, and its inaugural program, The Birth of Miyagi Television, aired at 9:30am. It initially was a joint affiliate of both NTV/NNN and NET/ANN. Per a 1972 Video Research study, its ratings surpassed the VHF stations (Tohoku Broadcasting and Sendai Television). Its ratings were at its highest in 1975, in both all-day and prime time periods. On October 1, 1975, Higashinippon Broadcasting opened as an ANN station, enabling the station to become a full-time NTV affiliate. Miyagi TV held its first cultural event in 1973, the Miyagi TV Cup Women's Gold Open, in 1973, the first female golf tournament in Tohoku. In 1990, it set up a record high number of visitors for the Miyagi Prefecture Arts Museum, for a [[[Auguste Rodin|Rodin]] exhibit. Stereo broadcasting (JOMM-TAM) began in 1980. In 1985, to adapt to its new businesses, it opened the West Building in 1985, upgraded its control room and set up a new Studio 1 with 320 square meters.

Until the 1990s, the station was often rated third. This changed when NTV's ratings grew. In 1995, it won the Triple Crown (6am-12am full day, 7pm-10pm prime time, 7pm-11pm evening) in ratings for the first time. Advertising revenue grew from 23.1% in 1990 to 25 7% in 1993 and later 29.1% in 1999. In 1994, it signed a co-operation agreement with Zhejiang Television. 1995 saw the refurbishing of its facilities, with a new headquarter complex featuring three buildings: the main building, the east building and the west building. A new news unit was established. Its official website launched in June 1996.

On October 1, 2001, the station unveiled its first mascot, MiTe (ミテ), designed by Makoto Matsunaga. Digital terrestrial broadcasts began on December 1, 2005 using LCN 4. The 2011 Tōhoku earthquake and tsunami caused the station to delay its analog shutdown to March 31, 2012. It also set up a disaster recovery plan.

In July 2012, it unveiled a new mascot, Dayon (だよん). It won the Triple Crown between 2010 and 2018.

== Programming ==
On October 4, 1970, it started airing Sunday Salon (日曜サロン), produced by the prefectural government. 1972 saw the introduction of MTB Housewives' Plaza (MTB奥様プラザ), a daily program for women and the first such successful local program. In July 1977, it started airing a female-oriented talk show, Today with Mitsukiko (満美子とともに今日もほがらか), seen on stations in Tohoku and Niigata. It was later renamed New Housewives' Age (奥様新時代) after five years and was still a success in the target demographic. Since then, it produced programs that were successful in the Tohoku region, such as Ito Shiro's OH! First Guest (伊東四朗のOH!先客万来), featuring interviews to regional celebrities. It produced a national variety show, Motto! Motto! TV (モット!モット!TV), from 1991 to 1995, which enjoyed a great success.

When the station launched, its news operation was limited to ten minutes a day from 6:30pm, while other stations still had their local news at 6:55pm. In 1995, it lanuched OH! Bandesu (OH!バンデス). Presented by Muneyuki Sato, it is the station's signature program. As of 2020, it was on air for 25 years. Since 2010, its evening news program is Miyagi news every. (ミヤギnews every.), the local edition of the national NNN program. From 1998 to 2004, it had its morning program, Ah! Sunny Day TV (あッ!晴れテレビ), which in 2000 recorded a 7.4% share.

The station also produces documentaries. The first such documentary to air nationwide was Three Generations of Kokeshi (こけし三代), which first aired on June 3, 1972, at a time when artisans were falling in numbers in Japan. In 1981, it aired 25 Days in the Election of the Governor of Miyagi Prefecture (社会党は燃えず―宮城県知事選の25日), which earned the station an NNN award. After the 2011 earthquake and tsunami, it also made documentaries on the effects caused by the quake in the region.
