= KHB =

KHB or khb may refer to:

- Higashinippon Broadcasting, a Japanese broadcast network affiliated with the ANN
- KHB, the station code for Khushab Junction railway station, Pakistan
- khb, the ISO 639-3 code for Tai Lue language
