= Television Yamaguchi Broadcasting Systems =

Television Yamaguchi Broadcasting Systems Co., Ltd.
- Logo used since March 28, 2005

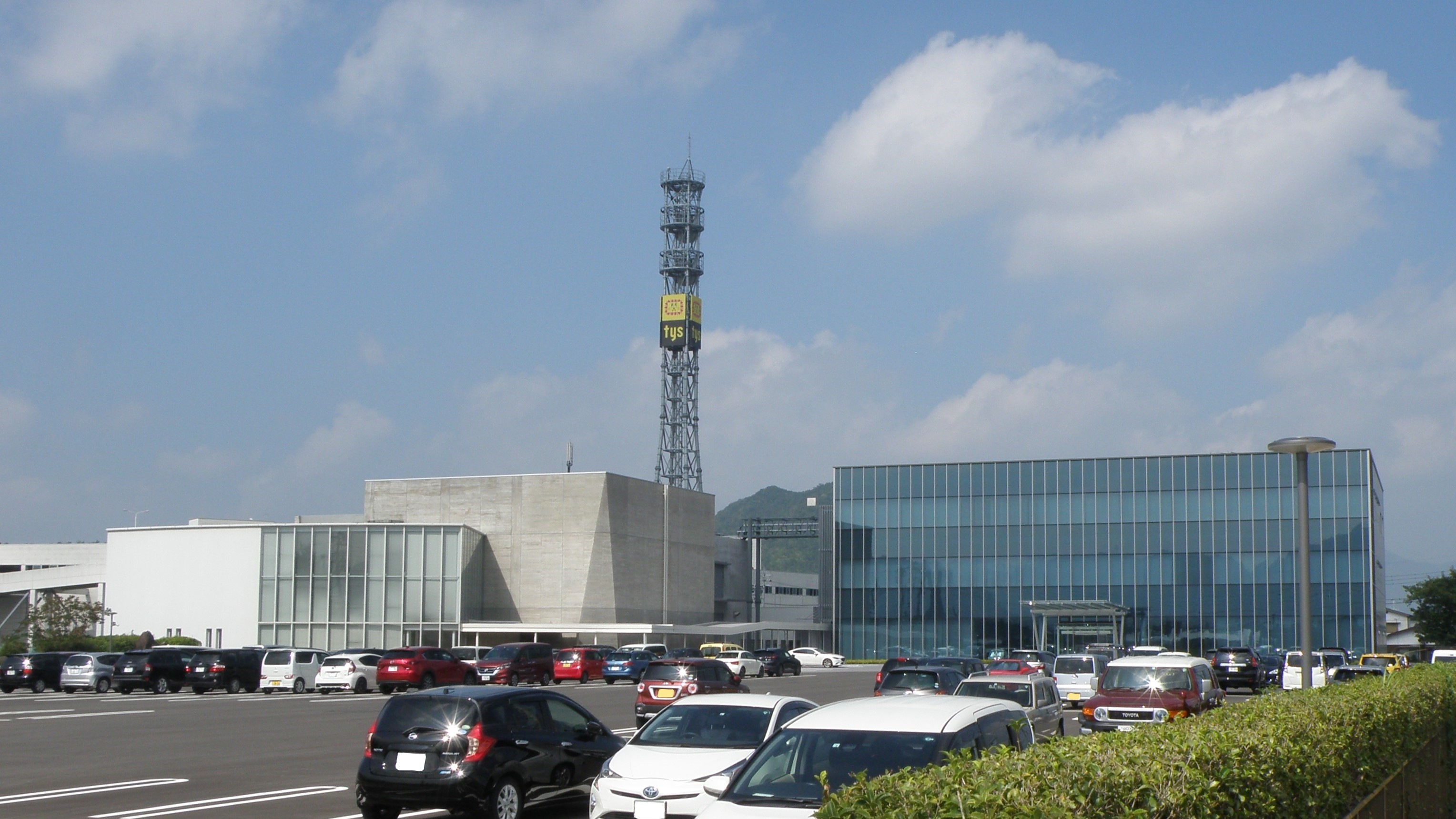
- Headquarters in Ouchicho, Yamaguchi
- Trade name: Television Yamaguchi
- Native name: テレビ山口株式会社
- Romanized name: Terebi Yamaguchi kabushikigaisha
- Company type: kabushiki gaisha
- Industry: Media
- Founded: April 1, 1969
- Headquarters: Ouchisenbo, Yamaguchi City, Yamaguchi Prefecture, Japan
- Services: Broadcast television
- Website: tys.co.jp

JOLI-DTV
- Yamaguchi Prefecture; Japan
- City: Yamaguchi
- Channels: Digital: 18 (UHF); Virtual: 3
- Branding: Television Yamaguchi tys

Programming
- Language: Japanese
- Affiliations: Japan News Network

Ownership
- Owner: Television Yamaguchi Broadcasting Systems Co., Ltd.

History
- First air date: April 1, 1970
- Former call signs: JOLI-TV (1970-2011)
- Former channel numbers: Analog: 38 (UHF, 1970-2011)
- Former affiliations: ANN (secondary, 1970-1978)

Technical information
- Licensing authority: MIC

JOLI-DTV (channel 3), branded as Television Yamaguchi (テレビ山口; TYS, stylized as tys) is a Japanese television station serving as the affiliate of the Japan News Network for Yamaguchi Prefecture. Owned and operated by Television Yamaguchi Broadcasting Systems, Inc. (Note: テレビ山口株式会社, Terebi Yamaguchi kabushikigaisha), its headquarters and studios are located in Yamaguchi.

== History ==
There has been a boom in applications for UHF TV stations throughout Japan since the Ministry of Posts and Telecommunications opened up UHF frequencies for terrestrial TV broadcasting. In Yamaguchi Prefecture, nine companies (including TV Yamaguchi, Yamaguchi Asahi Broadcasting, unrelated to the present-day YAB, and Yamaguchi Mainichi Broadcasting) have applied for TV broadcasting licenses. Since the policies of the time required that each prefecture would only receive one UHF allocation, the prefectural government decided to merge the requests. The prime minister of the time, Eisaku Sato, who was born in Yamaguchi Prefecture, was also part of the merging process. On November 19, 1968, the nine companies agreed to maintain the bid for Yamaguchi Central Television (山口中央テレビ), while the eight remaining companies continued to invest in it. On November 29, Yamaguchi Central Television obtained a preliminary license, becoming a part of the second tranche of licenses. The company was registered on January 20, 1969 and made a founders' meeting that day. In September, the name changed to TV Yamaguchi and adopted the abbreviation TYS. It initially planned to set up its headquarters in Hofu, but it was later decided to move to Yamaguchi, the prefectural capital, which was more convenient for news gathering. On the eves of its launch, it solicited bids for its logo, receiving 3704 applicants. The company's purple flag was adopted and a corporate theme was composed by Asei Kobayashi.

The greatest challenge was finding an affiliation. KRY was a charter affiliate of NNN/NNS since the beginning, meaning that the stage was open for three possible affiliations: JNN, FNN/FNS and ANN. At the time, FNN flagship Fuji TV was active in its network expansion, while TBS was passive regarding its possible integration, as its neighboring prefectures had long-established VHF affiliates (RKB Mainichi Broadcasting in Fukuoka and RCC Broadcasting in Hiroshima). JNN was leading Japanese television journalism at the time, but its programming, except for news, was obtained from both FNN and ANN. Test broadcasts began on December 25, 1969.

On April 1, 1970, at 6:30am, TYS started broadcasting. Proportionally, at launch time, 35% came from TBS, 22% from Fuji TV, 10% from NET and 33% was of its own production. Initially, the coverage was concentrated on the cities of Shimonoseki and Yamaguchi, but in its launch year, it began an expansion project, beginning in Yanai and later spreading to other key cities. In 1973, the station's capital increased, with its capital reaching 500 million yen.

In July 1978, due to a news exchange agreement with KRY, TV Asahi announced that it would cease supplying programs to TYS, causing the station to become a dual affiliate (JNN and FNS). In 1980, its tenth anniversary was marked by a series of art exhibits, including one with Picasso paintings. It also went to Spain and Australia to collect footage for special programs.

In March 1987, Fuji TV demanded TYS to relay at least one of its national news programs, or demanded the station to leave FNS. TBS planned to introduce a 10pm bulletin on Mondays and Tuesdays. Fuji TV used it as a chance to either join FNN full-time or leave the network completely. Ultimately, in October, TYS left the network and became a full-time JNN affiliate.

In the 1980s, it established sister station agreements with Shandong Television, Australia's NBN and Busan MBC. The TYS labor union was established in November 1988. At the time, the station set up its satellite news gathering unit. For its twentieth anniversary in 1990, it held an impressionist and post-impressionist art exhibit at the Yamaguchi Prefecture Art Museum.

On October 1, 2006, TYS began digital broadcasts, shutting down the analog signal on July 24, 2011. On March 28, 2020, its new headquarteres were completed. On November 15, 2023, due to an impasse between the labor union and the administration over winter bonuses, station staff went on strike for 48 hours.

== Programming ==
The station started airing the TYS Evening News Show (TYS夕やけニュースショー) in 1975, which aired on weeknights at 6pm. This was the first large-scale program occupying a five-day timestrip in the 6-7pm slot. It was replaced in 1985 by TYSニュース6. Currently, the news program is called mix (TV Yamaguchi) mix (mix (テレビ山口) mix). It introduced Weekend Chigumaya Family (週末ちぐまや家族) in 2005, on Saturday mornings, emphasizing on local information.
