= Nanoka =

Japanese model

- 菜乃花
- Born: 7 July 1989 (age 36); Hiroshima Prefecture, Japan
- Occupations: Gravure idol; tarento
- Years active: 2011 - date
- Agent: Fit One
- Height: 160 cm (5 ft 3 in)
- Spouse: Unknown (m. 2024)
- Children: 1

Nanoka (菜乃花; born 7 July 1989, in Fukuyama, Hiroshima) is a Japanese gravure idol. Her real name has not been published. She is represented by Fit One.

== Biography ==
The origin of Nanoka's stage name is from Tanabata's birthday, 7 July from "Nanaka".

She debuted at the Gravure Japan 2011.

In March 2013, Nanoka joined the Girls Unit FaDeLess.

In September 2014, her 4th DVD Nanoka Koi, Nanoka. was first in the Oricon · Idol Image DVD weekly rankings.

In 2015, Nanoka was elected as Nittelegenic 2015.

== Personal life ==
Nanoka is a Hiroshima Toyo Carp fan (Carp Girl).

On December 31, 2024, she announced her marriage and the birth of her first child.

== Works ==
=== DVD ===
Year	Title
2011	Mogi-tate Nanoka
2012	Second Love
2013	d-Bomb "Nanokappuru"
2014	Koi, Nanoka.
2014	Fuwafuwa Kiss
2015	Fuwafuwa Kiss 2
2015	Nanananana Nanoka
2015	Kanojo ga Gradol
2016	Jishu Tore......Nanoka!?
2016	Kimi to Isshoni
2016	Ai, Nanoka.
2017	Nano Omoi
2017	Trust
2018	Kimi no Tonari de
2019	Nanairo Nanoka?
2019	Last Message

=== Photo albums ===
Year	Title	Code
2015	nanoka	ISBN 978-4847048005
2017	Maji Nano (Akita DX Series)	ISBN 978-4253110839
2017	Genshun-dai Oppai Zukan	ISBN 978-4758015677
2018	Ichizu (Akita DX Series)	ISBN 978-4253110860
2018	wrap the BOOBs 2: Chakui Kyonyū Photo Collection	ISBN 978-4758015981
2020	Chantilly	
2021	Seishun no e Chie chi Photo Collection	ISBN 978-4768315026
2024	Shizuku	ISBN 978-4065369999

== Filmography ==
=== TV programmes ===
Year	Title	Network
2011	Tsubokko	TBS
2012	Toranaide Kudasai!! Gravure Idol Ura Monogatari	TV Tokyo
2012	Megami Kōrin	Mondo TV
2012	Pigu 1	Pigoo
2012	Aggressive desukedo, Nanika?	Local MC Konpa, Home
	Mono Pachi JPN!!	tvk
	Premium Gravure	Pigoo
2014	Pool de Blog	TV Asahi
2014	Kiriuri$Idol	Tokyo MX
2015	Yoroi Bijo	Fuji TV One
2015	Hoero! Pachisuro League	Mondo TV
2016	Kanmuri: Zekkei Onsen Hitorijime no Tabi	RCC
2017	Terebi wa x Susume! Sports Genki Maru presents: League Seiha e! Carp Kogane Jidai ga Yattekita SP	HTV
2017	Carp-dō	Home
2018	Shinshun Kōrei! Carp Senshu-kai Golf	HTV
2018	Yasei no bakusō ōkoku	Fuji TV One
2020	Tsuri no Kibun #2: Isaki na Kibun	Fishing Vision

=== Radio programmes ===
Year	Title	Network
2016	Ore-tachi Gocha maze!〜 Atsumare Yan Yan	MBS Radio

=== Advertisements ===
Year	Title
2012	Lotte Zacrich
2013	Jinro Try! Makkori Series TVCM "An Makkori"
2013	Kabushiki Gaisha Pokelabo Social Game Unmei no Clan Battle TVCM "Deban"

=== Internet ===
Title	Link
Nanoka Shōbu	Nanoka Shōbu

=== Films ===
Year	Title	Role	Ref.
2016	Tsugaru///Dogu	Mysterious lady	
2017	Cougar no Shiro: Joshi Keimusho	Nanami Hayashi	

=== Direct-to-video ===
Year	Title	Role
2017	Cougar no Shiro: Joshi Keimusho 2	Nanami Hayashi

=== Others ===
Year	Title	Ref.
2016	Kawaguchi Auto Race Image Curl	
