= Hiroshima Home Television =

Television station in Hiroshima, Japan

JOGM-DTV

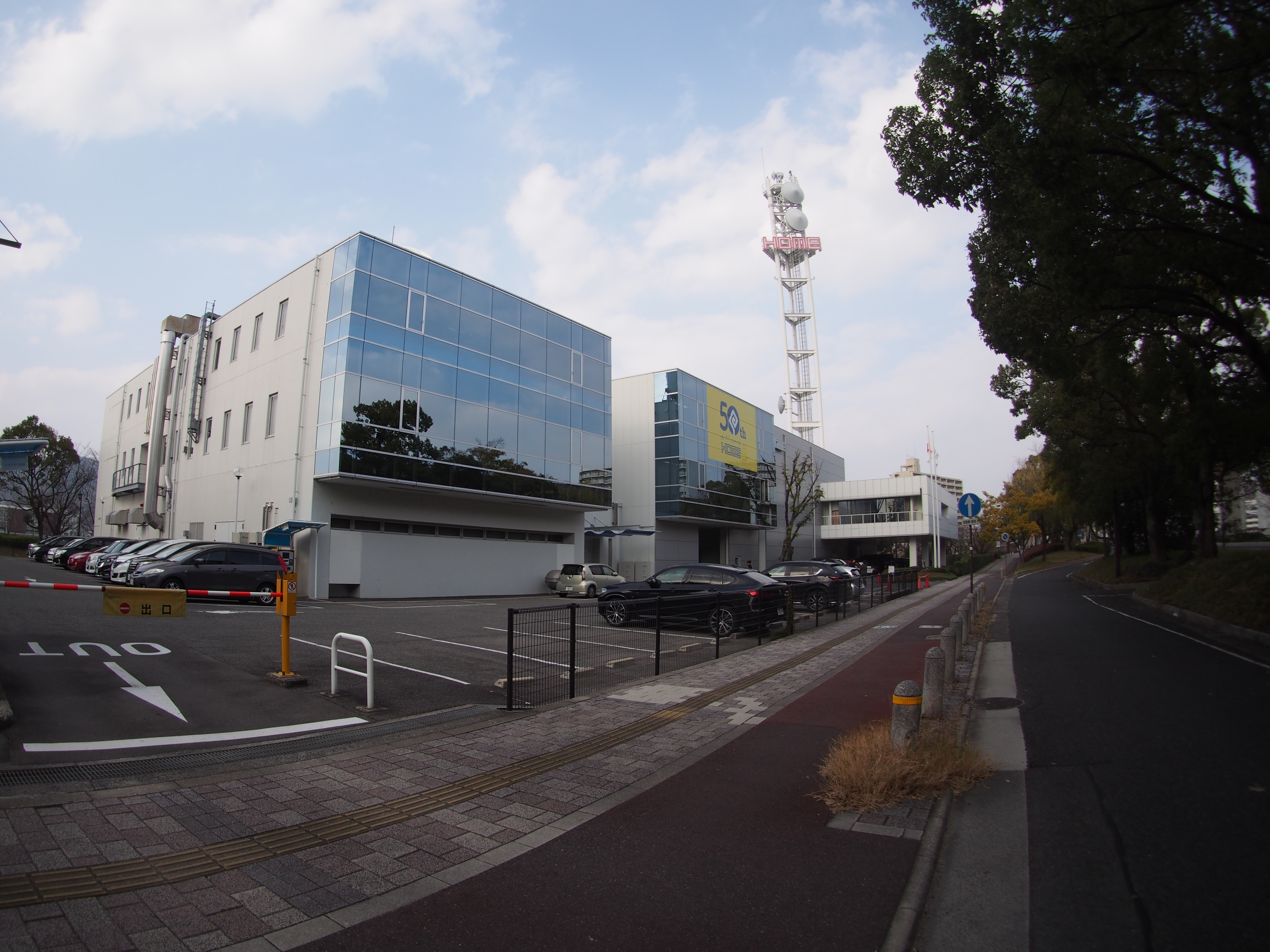
- Headquarters in Naka, Hiroshima
- Hiroshima Prefecture; Japan
- City: Hiroshima
- Channels: Digital: 22 (UHF); Virtual: 5
- Branding: HOME

Programming
- Language: Japanese
- Affiliations: All-Nippon News Network

Ownership
- Owner: Hiroshima Home Television Co., Ltd.

History
- First air date: December 1, 1970
- Former call signs: JOGM-TV (1970–2011)
- Former channel numbers: Analog: 35 (UHF, 1970–2011)
- Former affiliations: Fuji News Network/Fuji Network System (December 1, 1970 – September 30, 1975)

Technical information
- Licensing authority: MIC

Links
- Website: www.home-tv.co.jp

Corporate information
- Company
- Native name: 株式会社広島ホームテレビ
- Romanized name: Kabushikigaisha Hiroshima hōmuterebi
- Company type: Kabushiki gaisha
- Founded: December 25, 1969; 56 years ago
- Headquarters: 19-2 Shirashima Kitamachi, Naka Ward, Hiroshima City, Hiroshima Prefecture, Japan
- Owner: The Asahi Shimbun (18.05%); TV Asahi Holdings Corporation (6.20%)
- Website: www.home-tv.co.jp/company
- Footnotes / references Data from its Company Profile

JOGM-DTV (channel 5), also known as HOME (Note: ホーム, Hōmu) is a Japanese television station that serves as the affiliate of the All-Nippon News Network for Hiroshima Prefecture. The station is owned-and-operated by Hiroshima Home Television Co., Ltd. (Note: 株式会社広島ホームテレビ, Kabushiki Gaisha Hiroshima Hōmu Terebi) and its studios and headquarters are located in the Naka ward of Hiroshima.

== History ==
On September 18, 1964, the station makes a license request as Setonaikai Broadcasting (unrelated to the current TV station of the same name). At the time, at least 42 companies wanted to apply for the third commercial television station in the prefecture, and the Ministry of Posts and Telecommunications appointed Nagano Isuo to coordinate these applications. The company gained a preliminary license on November 18, 1969, on the founders' meeting on December 25, the name Hiroshima HOME Television was selected (Setonaikai Broadcasting in Kagawa started in April that year.)

In 1970, the station bought land to build its facilities, in Shiroshima Kita-cho, Hiroshima City; building took place between March and September 23. Test broadcasts were conducted from October 1; on December 1, at 6:50am, the station signed on its regular service for the first time, the first program being a morning bulletin from ANN News. At the time, the network carried programming from Nippon Educational Television (NET TV, current TV Asahi); the original abbreviation was UHT (UHF Hiroshima-Home Television).

In a ratings survey conducted by Video Research in January 1971, UHT achieved high ratings of 6.3% during the day and 12.3% during primetime hours. At the same time, the number of UHF-ready television sets in the prefecture increased to more than 544,000 units; that same year, the station's fortunes were worth 1.345 billion yen. In a survey in January 1973, its median all-day ratings were 8.4% and during primetime, 19.2%, becoming one of the most-viewed UHF stations of the time. Profits that year exceeded 2 billion yen.

Affected by the 1973 oil crisis which caused a slowing of the Japanese economy, as well as the intensification of competition with the start of a fourth commercial station, growth in revenue slowed in the middle of the decade. However, in 1978, revenue was worth 3.248 billion yen, an 11.7% increase, surpassing 3 billion yen. News gathering information abroad started in 1979 with dispatching of teams to Hawaii and Sichuan Province.

Equipment was upgraded on October 27, 1983 and sound multiplex broadcasts start on November 14, 1985, the first full ANN affiliate to do so. The station introduced its new corporate identity on April 1, 1986. Along with it, the main abbreviation changed to HOME.

The station's mascot, Pol Pol (ぽるぽる), was created upon the station's 30th anniversary celebrations in 2000; tie-in merchandise was also released. Digital terrestrial broadcasts commenced on October 1, 2006; analog terrestrial broadcasts concluded on 24 July 2011.
