= Ehime Asahi Television =

Coordinates: 33°49′27.6″N 132°45′31.2″E

JOEY-DTV
- Logo used since 2015

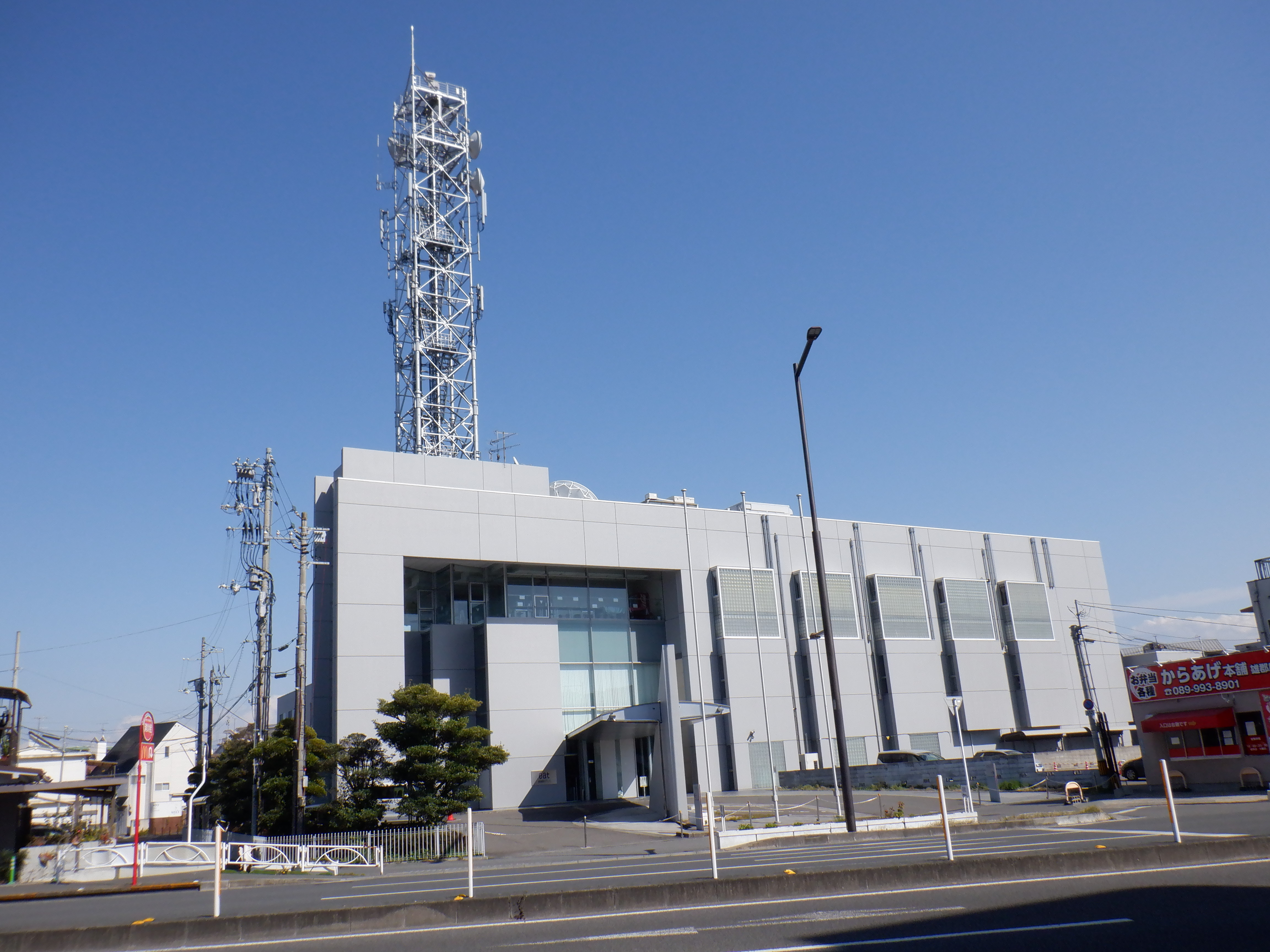
- Headquarters in Matsuyama, Ehime

Ehime Prefecture; Japan
- City: Matsuyama
- Channels: Digital: 17 (UHF); Virtual: 5
- Branding: Ehime Asahi Television eat

Programming
- Language: Japanese
- Affiliations: All-Nippon News Network

Ownership
- Owner: Ehime Asahi Television Co., Ltd.

History
- Founded: April 8, 1994
- First air date: April 1, 1995
- Former call signs: JOEY-TV (1995-2011)
- Former channel numbers: 25 (analog UHF, 1995-2011)
- Call sign meaning: Disambiguation of JOEI-TV

Technical information
- Licensing authority: MIC

Links
- Website: https://www.eat.co.jp

Ehime Asahi Television Co., Ltd. (株式会社愛媛朝日テレビ, Kabushiki-gaisha Ehime Asahi Terebi), also known as eat, is a Japanese broadcast network affiliated with the ANN. Their headquarters are located in Matsuyama, Ehime Prefecture.

== History ==
On October 16, 1992, following the launch of i-Television, the JNN affiliate, the MPT announced that there would be a fourth station in Ehime Prefecture, at the same time the decision was taken to open a third station in Kochi and a third station in Fukui (this last one never made it past the planning stages). On December 18, the frequency was allotted (channel 25).

The station started operations as the fourth TV station in Ehime Prefecture on the morning of April 1, 1995 (at 6:24am). The first program seen was the networked ANN News Fresh.

- 2006 October 1- Digital terrestrial television begins operations at the Matsuyama Main Station.
- 2011 July 24- Analog television ceases operations in 44 prefectures.

The station became the most watched during golden time (7-11pm) in 2019, for the first time since launch, and held that position until fiscal 2021.
