= All-Nippon News Network =

Japanese television network

- Type: Broadcast television network
- Country: Japan
- Owner: TV Asahi Corporation
- Key people: Masao Kimiwada
- Launch date: 1 January 1970
- Webcast: Official YouTube ch JapaNews24
- Official website: tv-asahi.co.jp/ann

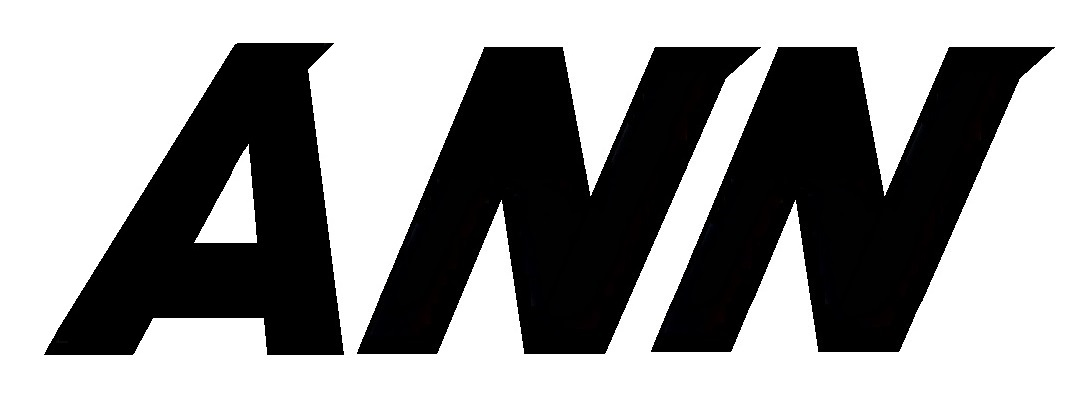
Old ANN logo (until September 2003)

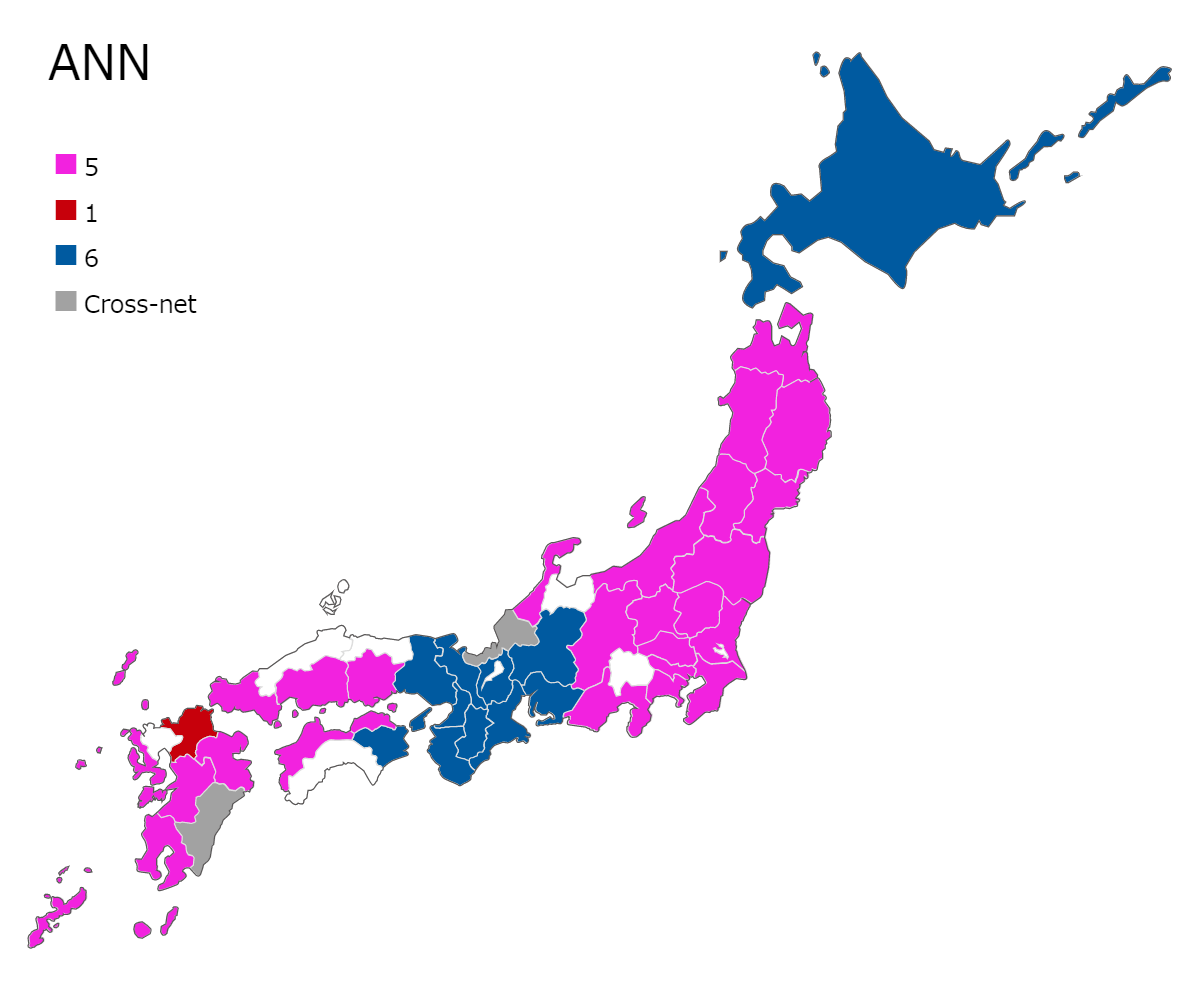
LCN assignments of ANN affiliates

All-Nippon News Network (ANN; Japanese: オールニッポンニュース・ネットワーク, romanized: Ōrunippon Nyūsu Nettowāku) is a Japanese commercial television network run by TV Asahi Corporation (TV Asahi) in Tokyo, a subsidiary of the TV Asahi Holdings Corporation, which is controlled by The Asahi Shimbun Company. The network's responsibilities include the syndication of national television news bulletins to its regional affiliates, and the news exchange between the stations. Its affiliate stations also broadcast non-news programs originating from TV Asahi. Founded on 1 January 1970, and formalised on 1 April 1974, ANN is made up of 26 affiliates, including two stations that are double- or triple-affiliated with rival networks.

Between 1989 and 2013, it also operated the 24-hour satellite and cable news channel Asahi Newstar.

== List of affiliates ==
Stations are listed mostly in the Japanese order of prefectures, which is mirrored in ISO 3166-2:JP, with exceptions for the Kantō region, the Aichi-Gifu-Mie area, the Kansai region (except Mie) and the Okayama-Kagawa area, which each form single wide broadcasting markets respectively.

Broadcasting area(s)		Station			LCN	Start date of broadcast	Date of affiliation	Note(s)
Prefecture	Region	On air branding	Abbr.	Call sign	LCN	Start date of broadcast	Date of affiliation	Note(s)
Hokkaidō		Hokkaidō TV	HTB	JOHH-DTV	6	3 November 1968	1 January 1970	Core station
Aomori	Tōhoku	Aomori Asahi Broadcasting	ABA	JOAH-DTV	5	1 October 1991	1 October 1991	
Iwate	Tōhoku	Iwate Asahi TV	IAT	JOIY-DTV	5	1 October 1996	1 October 1996	
Miyagi	Tōhoku	Higashinippon Broadcasting	khb	JOEM-DTV	5	1 October 1975	1 October 1975	Core station
Akita	Tōhoku	Akita Asahi Broadcasting	AAB	JOXX-DTV	5	1 October 1992	1 October 1992	
Yamagata	Tōhoku	Yamagata TV	YTS	JOYI-DTV	5	1 April 1970	1 April 1993	Was an ANN affiliate from 1 April 1975 until 1 July 1979 in dual affiliation; affiliated with FNN/FNS from 1 April 1975 until 1 April 1993
Fukushima	Tōhoku	Fukushima Broadcasting	KFB	JOJI-DTV	5	1 October 1981	1 October 1981	De facto core station
Kantō region		TV Asahi	EX (Note: Until 30 September 2003, abbreviated as ANB.)	JOEX-DTV	5	1 February 1959	1 January 1970	Eastern flagship station; core station
Niigata	Chūbu	Niigata TV 21	UX (Note: Until 31 July 2006, abbreviated as NT21.)	JOUX-DTV	5	1 October 1983	1 October 1983	De facto core station
Ishikawa	Chūbu	Hokuriku Asahi Broadcasting	HAB	JOWY-DTV	5	1 October 1991	1 October 1991	
Fukui	Chūbu	Fukui Broadcasting	FBC	JOPR-DTV	7	1 June 1960	1 April 1989	Secondary affiliate; also affiliated with NNN/NNS
Nagano	Chūbu	Nagano Asahi Broadcasting	abn	JOGH-DTV	5	1 April 1991	1 April 1991	
Shizuoka	Chūbu	Shizuoka Asahi TV (Note: Until 30 September 1993, using the name Shizuoka Kenmin TV.)	SATV (Note: Until 30 September 1993, abbreviated as SKT.)	JOSI-DTV	5	1 July 1978	1 July 1978	De facto core station
Aichi and Gifu	Chūbu	Nagoya TV / Mētele	NBN	JOLX-DTV	6	1 April 1962	1 January 1970	Core station
Mie	Kansai	Nagoya TV / Mētele	NBN	JOLX-DTV	6	1 April 1962	1 January 1970	Core station
Kansai region (except Mie)		ABC TV	ABC	JOAY-DTV	6	1 December 1956	31 March 1975	Western flagship station; core station
Hiroshima	Chūgoku	Hiroshima Home TV	HOME (Note: Until 31 March 1986, abbreviated as UHT.)	JOGM-DTV	5	1 December 1970	1 December 1970	De facto core station
Yamaguchi	Chūgoku	Yamaguchi Asahi Broadcasting	yab	JOYX-DTV	5	1 October 1993	1 October 1993	
Okayama	Chūgoku	Setonaikai Broadcasting	KSB	JOVH-DTV	5	1 April 1969	1 January 1970	De facto core station
Kagawa	Shikoku	Setonaikai Broadcasting	KSB	JOVH-DTV	5	1 April 1969	1 January 1970	De facto core station
Ehime	Shikoku	Ehime Asahi TV	eat	JOEY-DTV	5	1 April 1995	1 April 1995	
Fukuoka	Kyūshū	Kyushu Asahi Broadcasting	KBC	JOIF-DTV	1	1 March 1959	1 January 1970	Core station
Nagasaki	Kyūshū	Nagasaki Culture Telecasting	NCC	JOXI-DTV	5	1 April 1990	1 April 1990	
Kumamoto	Kyūshū	Kumamoto Asahi Broadcasting	KAB	JOZI-DTV	5	1 October 1989	1 October 1989	
Ōita	Kyūshū	Oita Asahi Broadcasting	OAB	JOBX-DTV	5	1 October 1993	1 October 1993	
Miyazaki	Kyūshū	TV Miyazaki	UMK	JODI-DTV	3	1 April 1970	1 April 1976	Secondary affiliate; also affiliated with FNN/FNS and NNN
Kagoshima	Kyūshū	Kagoshima Broadcasting	KKB	JOTI-DTV	5	1 October 1982	1 October 1982	De facto core station
Okinawa	Kyūshū	Ryukyu Asahi Broadcasting	QAB	JORY-DTV	5	1 October 1995	1 October 1995	

=== Areas without an ANN station ===
Prefecture	Region	Station(s) from neighbouring prefecture	News gathering
Toyama	Chūbu	HAB (Ishikawa)	TV Asahi Toyama Bureau and HAB Toyama Bureau
Yamanashi	Chūbu	TV Asahi (Kantō region)	TV Asahi Kōfu Bureau
Tottori	Chūgoku	KSB (Okayama and Kagawa)	TV Asahi Tottori Bureau (Eastern Tottori) and Yonago Bureau (Western Tottori)
Shimane	Chūgoku	yab (Yamaguchi) and HOME (Hiroshima)	TV Asahi Matsue Bureau (Eastern Shimane and Oki Islands), HOME (Western Shimane except Masuda and Kanoashi) and yab (Masuda and Kanoashi)
Tokushima	Shikoku	ABC TV (Kansai region)	ABC TV Tokushima Bureau
Kōchi	Shikoku	eat (Ehime) and KSB (Okayama and Kagawa)	ABC TV Kōchi Bureau and eat
Saga	Kyūshū	KBC (Fukuoka)	KBC Saga Bureau

=== Former affiliate stations ===
Single asterisk (*) indicates former primary affiliate

Broadcasting area(s)		Station			Ch.	Years of affiliation	Current affiliation	Current ANN affiliate	Note(s)
Prefecture	Region	On air branding	Abbr.	Call sign	Ch.	Years of affiliation	Current affiliation	Current ANN affiliate	Note(s)
Aomori	Tōhoku	Aomori TV	ATV	JOAI-TV	38	1970–1975 (secondary)	JNN	ABA	(Note: Currently an affiliate of JNN; dropped the secondary affiliation due to a violation of their affiliation agreement on 31 March 1975. ANN programming would end up airing on RAB from 1 April 1975 until 30 September 1991.)
Aomori	Tōhoku	Aomori Broadcasting	RAB	JOGR-TV	1	1975–1991	NNN/NNS	ABA	(Note: Now fully affiliated to NNN/NNS due to ATV's withdrawal of ANN. Dropped with launch of ABA on 1 October 1991.)
Iwate	Tōhoku	TV Iwate	TVI	JOII-TV	35	1970–1996 (secondary)	NNN/NNS	IAT	(Note: TVI is now a full affiliate of NNN/NNS; ANN programming moved to IAT when it opened on 1 October 1996. IBC, which is a full affiliate of JNN, aired select programs from ANN that were not cleared by TVI.)
Iwate	Tōhoku	IBC Iwate Broadcasting	IBC	JODF-TV	6	1970–1996 (secondary)	JNN	IAT	(Note: TVI is now a full affiliate of NNN/NNS; ANN programming moved to IAT when it opened on 1 October 1996. IBC, which is a full affiliate of JNN, aired select programs from ANN that were not cleared by TVI.)
Miyagi	Tōhoku	Miyagi TV	mm34	JOMM-TV	34	1970–1975	NNN/NNS	KHB	(Note: Became a full-time affiliate of NNN/NNS when KHB began broadcasting on 1 October 1975.)
Akita	Tōhoku	Akita TV	AKT	JOBI-TV	37	1981–1987 (secondary)	FNN/FNS	AAB	(Note: Secondary affiliation. Akita TV partially dropped its ANN affiliation (ANN news programs no longer aired) on 1 April 1987, to focus on airing more Fuji TV programmes. Between 1 April 1987 and 30 September 1992, AKT and ABS shared on airing select TV Asahi programmes. AKT and ABS completely dropped its ANN affiliation when AAB started broadcasting on 1 October 1992.)
Niigata	Chūbu	Niigata Sogo TV	NST	JONH-TV	35	1970–1983	FNN/FNS	UX	(Note: Secondary affiliation. NST was a triple affiliate of FNN/FNS, NNN/NNS and ANN. NNN/NNS programming moved to TNN (now TeNY) on 1 April 1981, and ANN programming moved to NT21 (now UX) on 1 October 1983.)
Nagano	Chūbu	TV Shinshu	TSB	JONI-TV	30	1981–1991 (secondary)	NNN/NNS	abn	(Note: Secondary affiliation from 1 October 1981 to 31 March 1991. Became a full NNN/NNS affiliate when abn started broadcasting on 1 April 1991, taking over the TV Asahi schedule from TSB.)
Aichi and Gifu	Chūbu	Chūkyō TV*	CTV	JOCH-TV	35	1970–1973	NNN/NNS	NBN	(Note: Switched networks with NBN on 1 April 1973, owing to a conflict between the two networks, the decision was taken on 28 December 1972, and CTV then joined NNN/NNS.)
Mie	Kansai	Chūkyō TV*	CTV	JOCH-TV	35	1970–1973	NNN/NNS	NBN	(Note: Switched networks with NBN on 1 April 1973, owing to a conflict between the two networks, the decision was taken on 28 December 1972, and CTV then joined NNN/NNS.)
Kansai region (except Mie)		Mainichi Broadcasting*	MBS	JOOR-TV	4	1970–1975	JNN	ABC	(Note: Primary affiliation between 1 January 1970 and 30 March 1975. Swapped networks with ABC on 1 April 1975, because of ownership issues: all stations owned by (and linked to) The Asahi Shimbun were now required to become affiliates of TV Asahi. As a result, MBS was now a JNN affiliate, and is still a significant producer for the network.)
Tottori and Shimane	Chūgoku	Nihonkai TV	NKT	JOJX-TV	1	1959–1989 (secondary)	NNN/NNS	N/A	(Note: Secondary affiliation from the founding of the network (3 March 1959) until 30 September 1989. NKT, BSS, and TSK now carry some TV Asahi shows on their schedules. There is currently no primary ANN affiliate based in the San'in region (comprising Tottori and Shimane).)
Okayama	Chūgoku	Okayama Broadcasting	OHK	JOOH-TV	35	1 January–1 April 1970; 1 October 1970 – 31 March 1979	FNN/FNS	KSB	(Note: Became a full-time FNN/FNS affiliate in 1979. ANN programming moved to KSB. The reason this was made was because the station, unlike KSB, did not broadcast to nearby Kagawa until 1979.)
Yamaguchi	Chūgoku	TV Yamaguchi	tys	JOLI-TV	38	1970–1978 (secondary)	JNN	yab	(Note: Secondary affiliation from 1 April 1970 to 30 September 1978, only used to provide programming. Changed networks to a dual network affiliate of JNN and FNN/FNS between 1 April 1970 and 31 August 1978. ANN programming moved to KRY on 1 October 1978.)
Yamaguchi	Chūgoku	Yamaguchi Broadcasting	KRY	JOPF-TV	11	1978–1993	NNN/NNS	yab	(Note: Dropped ANN programming in favor of a full-time NNN/NNS affiliation on 30 September 1993. TV Asahi programming moved to yab the following day.)
Kumamoto	Kyūshū	TV Kumamoto	TKU	JOZH-TV	34	1970–1989 (secondary)	FNN/FNS	KAB	(Note: Secondary affiliation from 1 January 1970 to 30 September 1989. ANN programming moved to KAB when it opened on 1 October 1989.)
Ōita	Kyūshū	TV Oita	TOS	JOOI-TV	36	1970–1993 (secondary)	NNN/NNS and FNN/FNS	OAB	(Note: Secondary affiliation; ANN programming moved to OAB in 1993. Currently, TV Oita is an affiliate of NNN/NNS, holding a secondary affiliation with FNN/FNS.)
Kagoshima	Kyūshū	Kagoshima TV	KTS	JOKH-TV	38	1970–1982 (secondary)	FNN/FNS	KKB	(Note: Secondary affiliation from 1 January 1970 to 30 September 1982. ANN programming moved to KKB on 1 October 1982. The station is now affiliated to FNN/FNS.)

== Affiliates that initially wanted to join but later withdrew ==
	Broadcasting area(s)	Station			Ch.	Current affiliation	Current ANN affiliate	Note(s)
Region	Prefecture	On air branding	Abbr.	Call sign	Ch.	Current affiliation	Current ANN affiliate	Note(s)
Tōhoku	Iwate	mit	mit	JOYH-TV	33	FNN/FNS	IAT	It was due to the intention of Ichiro Ozawa, a politician based in Iwate, and because Iwate Asahi Television was scheduled to open.
Chūbu	Toyama	TUT	TUT	JOJH-TV	32	JNN	N/A	At the time of the frequency allocation of the 3rd station in Toyama Prefecture in 1986, the prospect of joining the TV Asahi network was considered promising, but in the end it was decided to open as a TBS affiliate.
Chūbu	Fukui	FTB	FTB	JOFI-TV	39	FNN/FNS	FBC	During the preparation period for the opening of the station, an agreement was signed with NET TV, but in July 1969, just before the opening of the station, it became a Fuji TV (FNN/FNS) affiliate.
Chūbu	Gifu	GBS	GBS	JOZF-TV	37	JAITS	(NBN)	Due to opposition from Nagoya Television and Chukyo Television. Eventually, Nagoya TV became the ANN affiliate station in the Chūkyō metropolitan area in 1973.
	Kansai region (except Mie)	KTV	KTV	JODX-TV	8	FNN/FNS	ABC	The Sankei Shimbun Tokyo head office was also involved in NET TV, which was in the preparation stage for the opening of the station, and had dispatched officers from the standpoint of a shareholder. Also, NET TV initially invested in Kyodo Television, but withdrew the capital before the opening of the station. (At that time, before the launch of ANN)
Shikoku	Ehime	ITV	itv	JOEH-TV	29	JNN	eat	Because it conflicted with the JNN agreement and the opening of Ehime Asahi TV was decided at that time.
Kyūshū	Kumamoto	KKT	KKT	JOQI-TV	22	NNN/NNS	KAB	As a result of the unification adjustment and discussion by three flagship stations in Tokyo (Nippon Television, Fuji Television, and TV Asahi), instead of making Kumamoto Prefecture's third commercial station a TV Asahi affiliate because Kagoshima Broadcasting claimed the affiliation, the station became a Nippon Television affiliate.

== JapaNews24 ==
Since at least 2018, ANN operates JapaNews24 (Japanese: 日本のニュースを24時間配信, romanized: Nihon no nyūsu o 24-jikan haishin), an around-the-clock online feed aimed mainly at Japanese people at home and abroad, available on ANN's official YouTube channel. JapaNews24 continuously airs news stories from ANN newscasts and programmes such as Hōdō Station, as well as content from the sister service AbemaNews, on tape delay and without a fixed schedule.
