= Television Iwate =

JOII-DTV
- Logo used since 2018

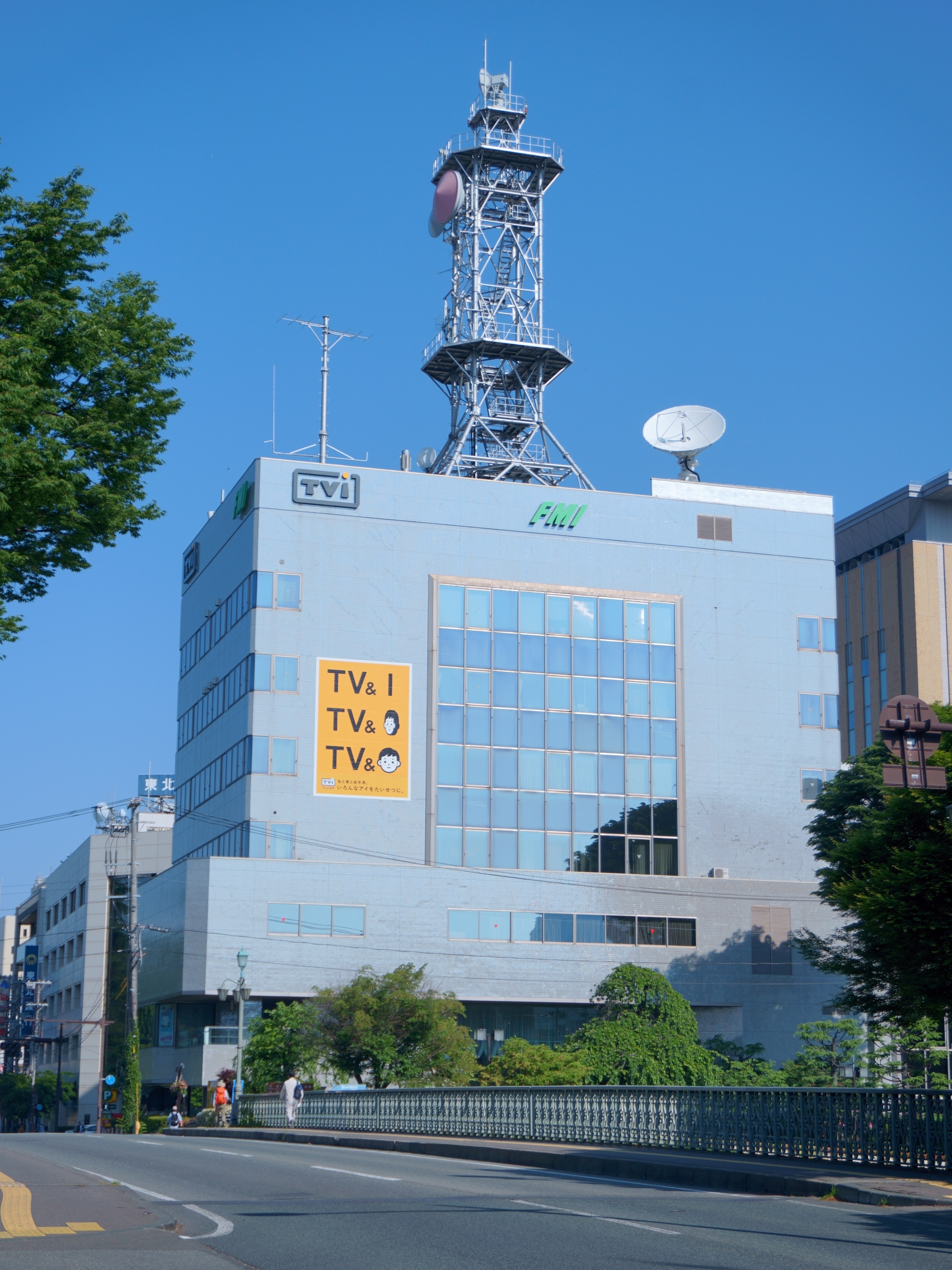
- Television Iwate / FM-Iwate HQ in Morioka
- Iwate Prefecture; Japan
- City: Morioka
- Channels: Digital: 18 (UHF); Virtual: 4
- Branding: Television Iwate; TVI

Programming
- Affiliations: Nippon News Network and Nippon Television Network System

Ownership
- Owner: Television Iwate Co., Ltd.

History
- Founded: January 23, 1969
- First air date: December 1, 1969
- Former call signs: JOII-TV (1969–2012)
- Former channel numbers: Analog: 35 (UHF, 1969–2012)
- Former affiliations: ANN (secondary, 1970–1996)
- Call sign meaning: TerebIIwate (Japanese name of broadcaster)

Technical information
- Licensing authority: MIC

Links
- Website: www.tvi.jp

Television Iwate Co., Ltd (株式会社テレビ岩手, Kabushiki-gaisha TV Iwate), also known as TVI, is a Japanese broadcast network affiliated with the Nippon News Network and Nippon Television Network System. Their headquarters are located in Morioka, Iwate Prefecture.

== History ==
- December 1, 1969: It was set up to become Iwate Prefecture's second broadcasting station.
- October 1, 2006: their Morioka Station started their first Digital terrestrial television broadcasts.
