= Setonaikai Broadcasting =

Setonaikai Broadcasting Corporation
- Logo used since 2020

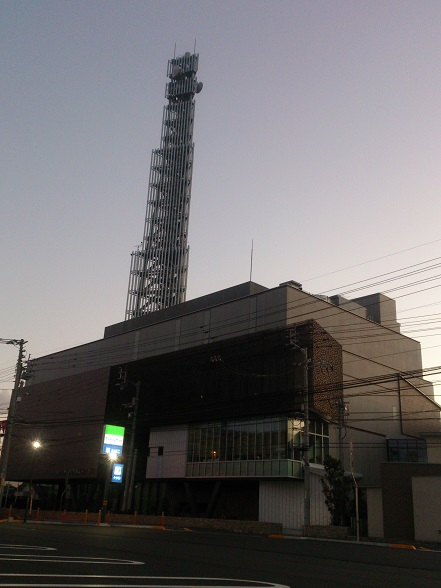
- Headquarters in Takamatsu, Kagawa
- Native name: 株式会社瀨戸内海放送
- Romanized name: Kabushiki-gaisha Setonaikai Hōsō
- Type: Private KK
- Industry: Television network
- Founded: November 22, 1967; 58 years ago
- Headquarters: Kaminomachi, Takamatsu, Kagawa Prefecture, Japan
- Website: www.ksb.co.jp

JOVH-DTV
- Kagawa and Okayama; Japan
- Channels: Digital: 30 (UHF); Virtual: 5
- Branding: KSB Setonaikai Broadcasting

Programming
- Language: Japanese
- Affiliations: All-Nippon News Network

Ownership
- Owner: Setonaikai Broadcasting Corporation

History
- First air date: April 1, 1969
- Former call signs: JOVH-TV (1969–2011)
- Former channel numbers: Analog: 25 (UHF, 1969–2011)

Technical information
- Licensing authority: MIC
- ERP: 2kW
- Transmitter coordinates: 34°33′33″N 133°57′47.2″E

Setonaikai Broadcasting Co., Ltd. (株式会社瀬戸内海放送, Kabushiki-gaisha Setonaikai Hōsō; KSB) is a TV station broadcasting in Kagawa and Okayama Prefectures. It is a member station of the All-Nippon News Network (ANN).

== History ==
A preliminary license was granted on November 1, 1967; on November 22, 1967, it was established as Shin-nihon Broadcasting. The current name was adopted on February 19, 1968.

- April 1, 1969: Analog TV Broadcasting started
- December 1, 2006: Digital TV Broadcasting started
- July 24, 2011: Analog TV Broadcasting ended
- January 18, 2021: Moved to its new headquarters in Kaminocho, Takamatsu City, Kagawa Prefecture from its former headquarters in Saihōchō Itchōme, Takamatsu, Kagawa Prefecture.
