= Television Oita System =

JOOI-DTV

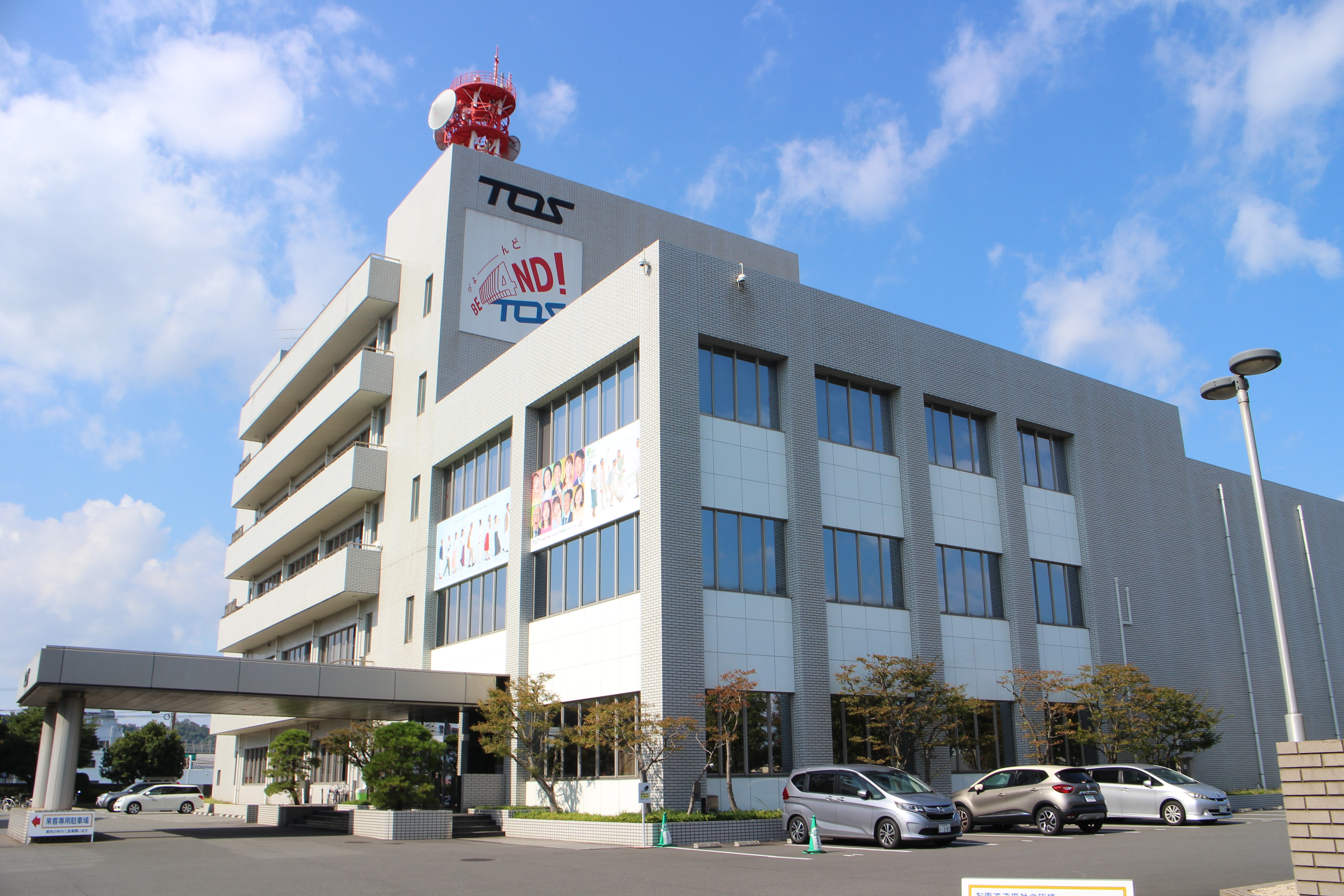
- Headquarters in Oaza, Ōita
- Ōita Prefecture; Japan
- City: Ōita
- Channels: Digital: 34 (UHF); Virtual: 4
- Branding: Television Oita; TOS

Programming
- Language: Japanese
- Affiliations: Nippon News Network/Nippon Television Network System; Fuji News Network/Fuji Network System

Ownership
- Owner: Television Oita System Co., Ltd.

History
- First air date: April 1, 1970
- Former call signs: JOOI-TV (1970–2011)
- Former channel numbers: Analog: 36 (UHF, 1970–2011)
- Former affiliations: All-Nippon News Network (secondary, 1970–1993)
- Call sign meaning: Oita

Technical information
- Licensing authority: MIC

Links
- Website: www.tostv.jp

Corporate information
- Company
- Native name: 株式会社テレビ大分
- Romanized name: Kabushiki-gaisha Terebi Oita
- Type: Business corporation
- Industry: Television broadcasting
- Founded: February 25, 1969; 57 years ago
- Headquarters: Seike, Oaza, Ōita City, Oita Prefecture, Japan
- Owner: The Yomiuri Shimbun Holdings (19.90%); Kansai Television (19.90%); Nikaido Shuzo (6.80%); The Nishinippon Shimbun (5.96%); Sankei Shimbun Co., Ltd. (5.00%); Oita Godo Shimbun (5.00%); The Howa Bank (5.00%)
- Footnotes; Data from its Corporate Profile

Television Oita System Co., Ltd. (株式会社テレビ大分, Kabushiki-gaisha Terebi Oita; TOS) is a regional television broadcaster headquartered in Ōita, Ōita Prefecture, Japan, that serves Ōita Prefecture as an affiliate of the Nippon News Network/Nippon Television Network System and Fuji News Network/Fuji Network System.

== History ==
TOS is the second commercial television station in Ōita Prefecture. It was founded in 1969, and started on air on April 1, 1970. When it was founded, TOS was affiliated with NNN/NNS, FNN/FNS and ANN. But due to the launch of Oita Asahi Broadcasting in 1993, the station became a dual NNN/NNS and FNN/FNS affiliate. Kansai Television and Yomiuri Shimbun are the main shareholders of TOS.

TOS started broadcasting digital terrestrial television on December 1, 2006. Since 2014, TOS started to produce and broadcast its local news program Yuwaku wide&News (ゆ〜わくワイド&News). On April 1, 2017, TOS signed a partnership agreement with Oita Cable Telecom (the biggest cable TV provider in Oita prefecture.
