= Hokuriku Asahi Broadcasting =

Television station in Ishikawa Prefecture, Japan

Hokuriku Asahi Broadcasting Co., Ltd.
- Logo used since 2021

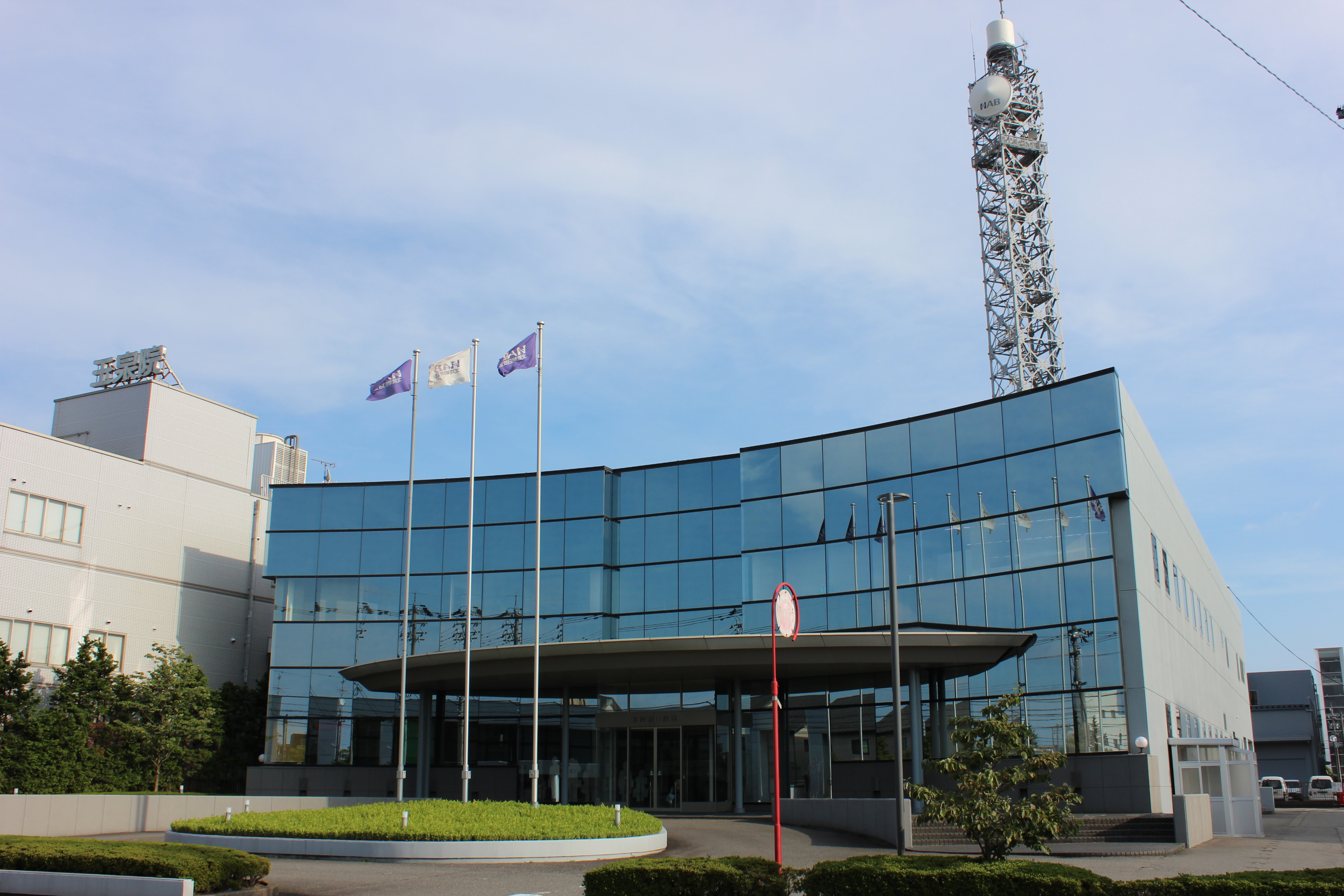
- Native name: 北陸朝日放送株式会社
- Romanized name: Hokurikuasahihōsō kabushikigaisha
- Type: Kabushiki gaisha
- Founded: November 14, 1990; 36 years ago
- Headquarters: 1-32-2 Matsushima, Kanazawa City, Ishikawa Prefecture, Japan
- Website: www.hab.co.jp
- Footnotes; Data from its Corporate Profile

JOWY-DTV
- Ishikawa Prefecture; Japan
- City: Kanazawa
- Channels: Digital: 23 (UHF); Virtual: 5
- Branding: HAB; Hokuriku Asahi Broadcasting

Programming
- Language: Japanese
- Affiliations: All-Nippon News Network

Ownership
- Owner: Hokuriku Asahi Broadcasting Co., Ltd.

History
- First air date: October 1, 1991
- Former call signs: JOWY-TV (1991–2011)
- Former channel numbers: Analog: 25 (UHF, 1991–2011)
- Call sign meaning: Sequential assignment after JOWX-TV

Technical information
- Licensing authority: MIC

Hokuriku Asahi Broadcasting Co., Ltd. (北陸朝日放送株式会社, Hokuriku Asahi Hōsō Kabushiki Gaisha), also known as HAB, is a Japanese broadcast network affiliated with ANN. Their headquarters are located in Ishikawa Prefecture.

== History ==
HAB launched on October 1, 1991, as Ishikawa Prefecture's fourth broadcasting station. On its fifteenth anniversary, October 1, 2006, the station began Digital terrestrial television broadcasts from its primary transmitter at Kanazawa and its Nanao relay.

== Transmitters ==
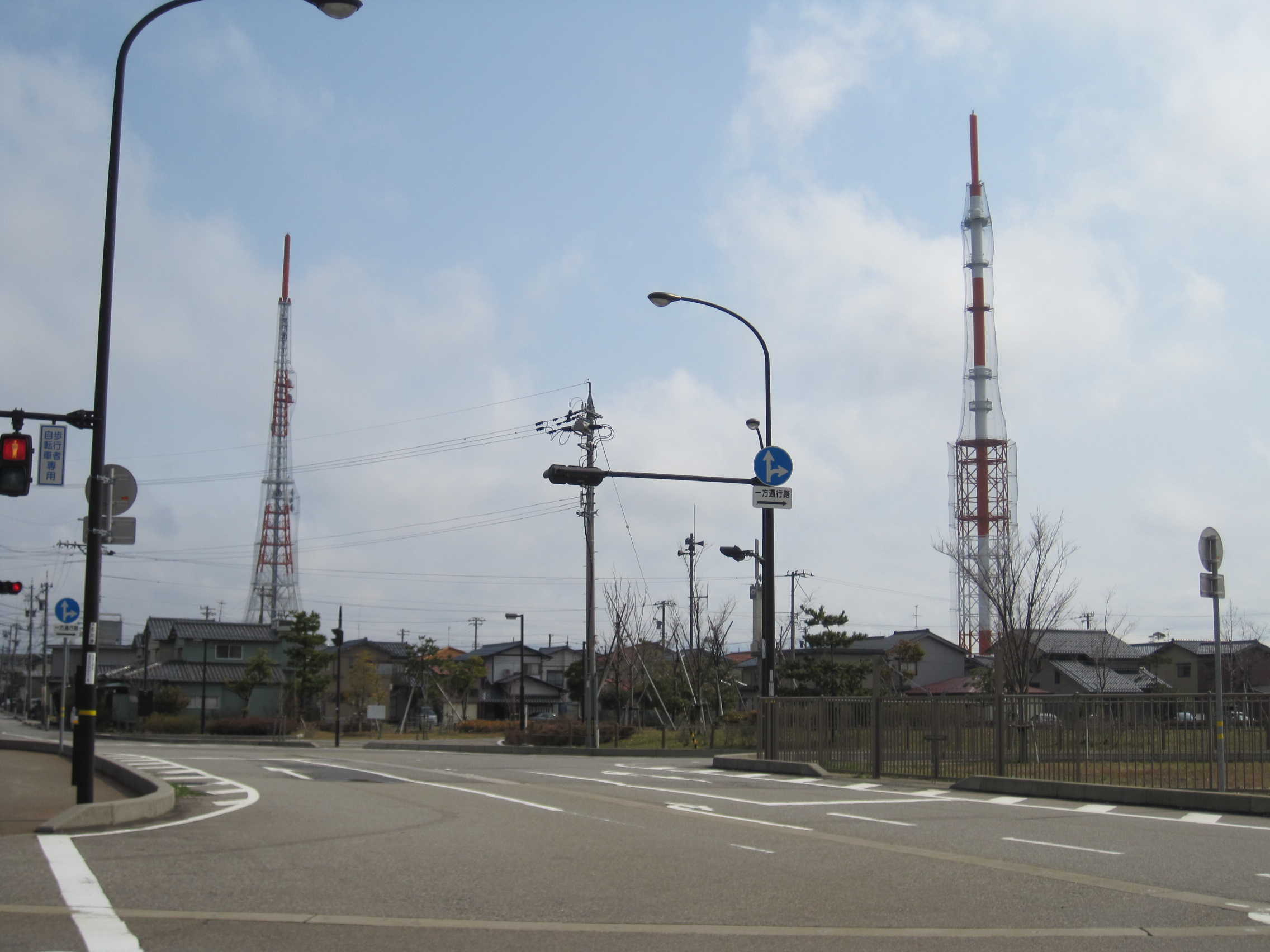
The Kannondo television transmitter site; HAB, TV Kanazawa and the NHK use the mast on the left

Transmitters of JOWY-DTV
| Location | Channel |
|---|---|
| Kanazawa | 23 |
| Kaga | 26 |
| Hakusan (Oguchi) | 22 |
| Hakusan (Torigoe) | 22 |
| Nanao | 42 |
| Nakanoto (Kashima) | 22 |
| Hakui | 26 |
| Shika (Togi) | 22 |
| Wajima | 26 |
| Wajima | 41 |
| Wajima (Monzen) | 29 |
| Suzu | 25 |
