= Yamaguchi Asahi Broadcasting =

JOYX-DTV
- Logo used since 2006

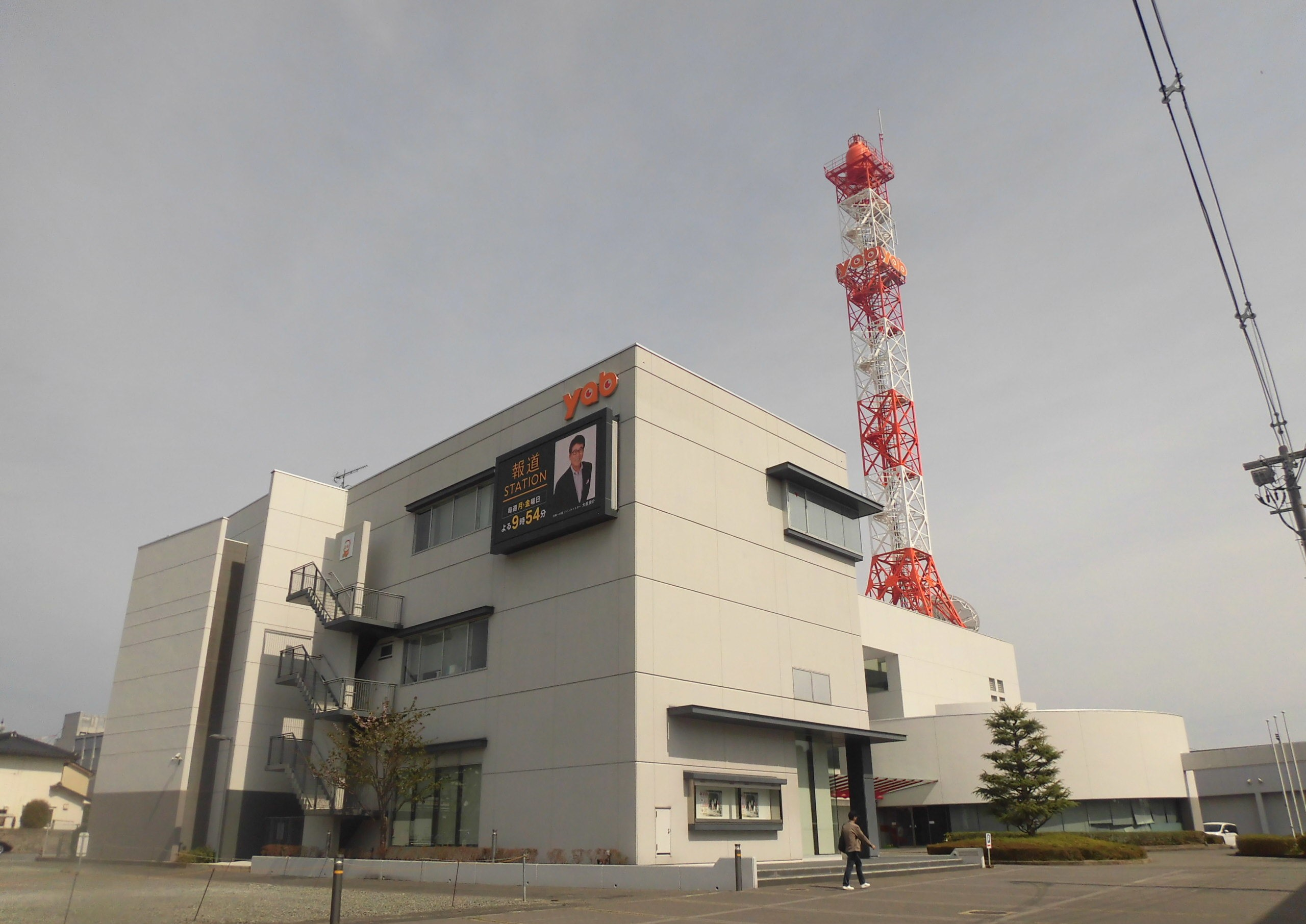
- Headquarters in Chuo, Yamaguchi
- Yamaguchi Prefecture; Japan
- City: Yamaguchi
- Channels: Digital: 28 (UHF); Virtual: 5
- Branding: yab Yamaguchi Asahi Broadcasting

Programming
- Affiliations: All-Nippon News Network

Ownership
- Owner: Yamaguchi Asahi Broadcasting Co., Ltd.

History
- Founded: November 20, 1992
- First air date: October 1, 1993
- Former call signs: JOYX-TV (1993-2011)
- Former channel numbers: Analog: 28 (UHF, 1993-2011)

Technical information
- Licensing authority: MIC

Links
- Website: www.yab.co.jp

Yamaguchi Asahi Broadcasting Co., Ltd. (山口朝日放送, Yamaguchi Asahi Hōsō), also known as yab, callsigns JOYX-DTV (channel 5) is a Japanese television network headquartered in Yamaguchi City, Yamaguchi Prefecture that is affiliated with the All-Nippon News Network.

Yamaguchi Asahi Broadcasting is the third commercial television broadcaster in Yamaguchi Prefecture. it was founded in 1992, and started broadcasting in 1993. On October 1, 2006, yab started broadcasting digital terrestrial television. TV Asahi and Asahi Shimbun are the top shareholders of yab. Tokuyama Corporation is the third largest shareholder of yab. In 2023, yab unveiled a special brand for its 30th anniversary.
