= Oita Asahi Broadcasting =

Oita Asahi Broadcasting Co., Ltd.

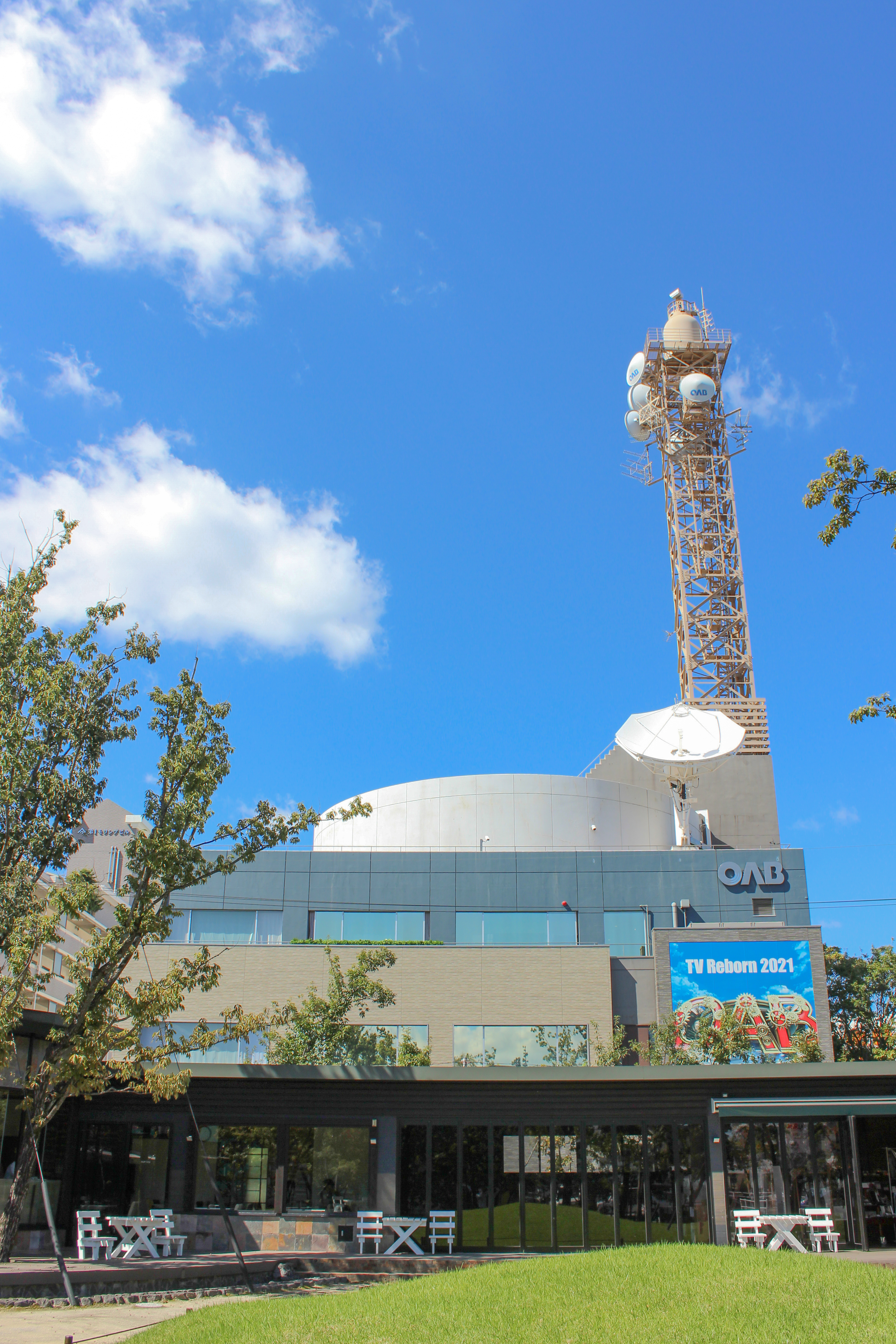
- Trade name: OAB
- Native name: 大分朝日放送株式会社
- Romanized name: Ōita Asahi Hōsō Kabushiki Gaisha
- Type: Kabushiki gaisha
- Industry: Television broadcasting
- Founded: May 25, 1992
- Headquarters: 12 Shinkawanishi, Oita City, Oita Prefecture, Japan
- Key people: Jin Hashimoto (President and CEO)
- Owner: TV Asahi Holdings Corporation (19.98%); The Asahi Shimbun (18.70%); Kyushu Asahi Broadcasting (10.28%)
- Website: www.oab.co.jp
- Footnotes; Data from its Corporate Profile

JOBX-DTV
- Oita Prefecture; Japan
- City: Oita City
- Channels: Digital: 32 (UHF); Virtual: 5
- Branding: Oita Asahi Broadcasting; OAB

Programming
- Affiliations: All-Nippon News Network

Ownership
- Owner: Oita Asahi Broadcasting Co., Ltd.

History
- First air date: October 1, 1993
- Former call signs: JOBX-TV (1993–2011)
- Former channel numbers: Analog: 24 (UHF; 1993–2011)
- Call sign meaning: Oita

Technical information
- Licensing authority: MIC

Links
- Website: www.oab.co.jp

Oita Asahi Broadcasting Co., Ltd. (大分朝日放送株式会社, Ōita Asahi Hōsō Kabushiki Gaisha), also known as OAB, is a Japanese broadcast network affiliated with the ANN. Their headquarters are located in Oita Prefecture.

== History ==
OAB is the third commercial television station in Ōita Prefecture. It was founded in 1993, after ANN left TOS to make their own broadcasting.

OAB started broadcasting digital terrestrial television on December 1, 2006.
