= Asahi Broadcasting Nagano =

JOGH-DTV
- Logo used since 2006

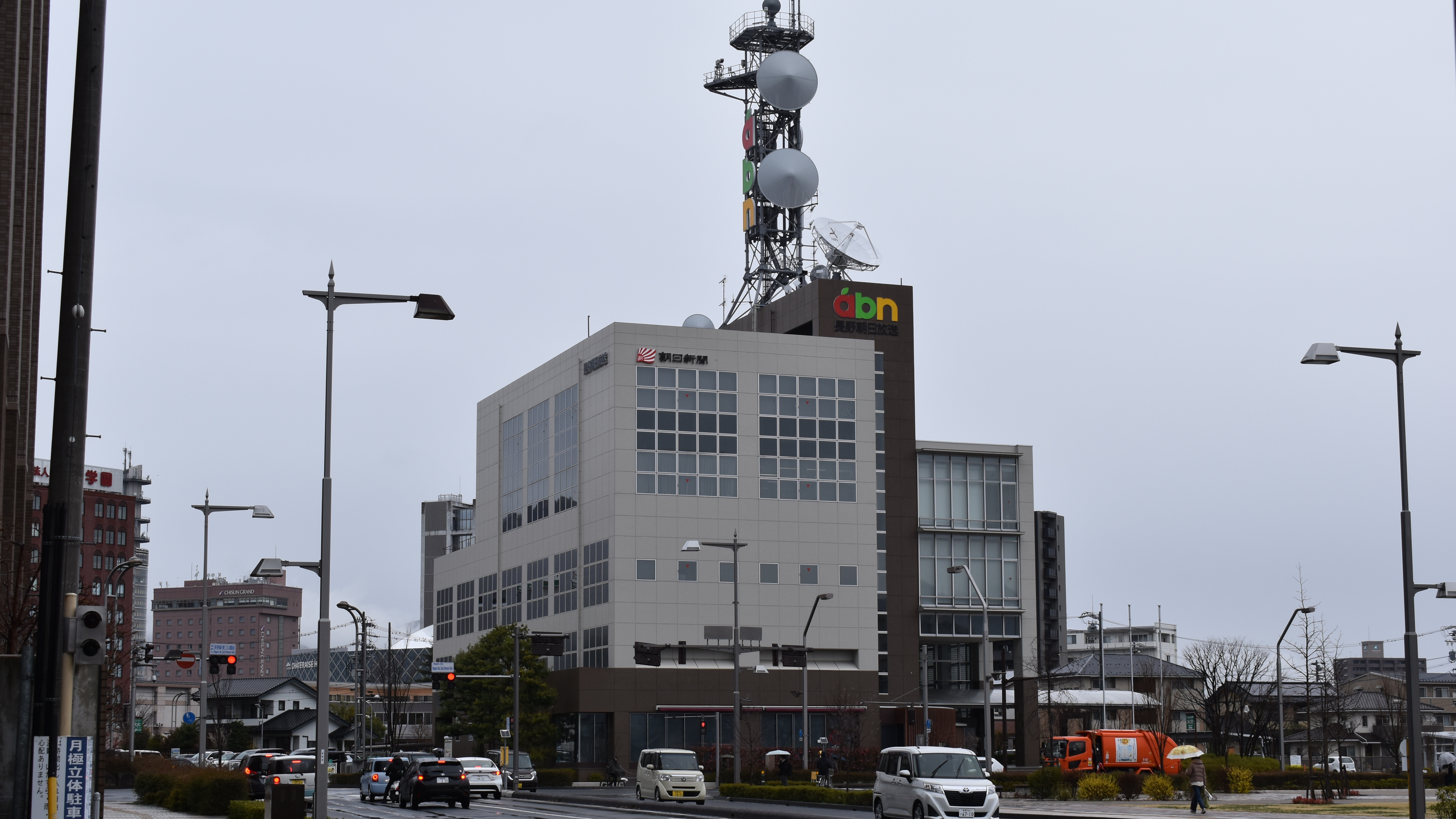
- Nagano Prefecture; Japan
- City: Nagano
- Channels: Digital: 18 (UHF); Virtual: 5
- Branding: Asahi Broadcasting Nagano, ABN

Programming
- Language: Japanese
- Affiliations: All-Nippon News Network

Ownership
- Owner: Asahi Broadcasting Nagano Co., Ltd.

History
- First air date: April 1, 1991
- Former call signs: JOGH-TV (1991–2011)
- Former channel numbers: Analog: 20 (UHF, 1991–2011)

Technical information
- Licensing authority: MIC

Links
- Website: www.abn-tv.co.jp

Asahi Broadcasting Nagano Co., Ltd. (長野朝日放送株式会社, Nagano Asahi Hōsō Kabushiki-gaisha), also known as abn, is a Japanese broadcast network affiliated with the ANN. Their headquarters are located in Nagano Prefecture.

== History ==
- 1991-04-01 It was set up as Nagano Prefecture's fourth broadcasting station.
- 2006-10-01 Its Digital terrestrial television broadcasts began (Utsukushigahara (Main), Zenkoji-daira, Matsumoto, Okaya-Suwa, Ina, and Iida Stations).
- 2011-07-24 Analog broadcasts were discontinued.

== Stations ==
=== Digital (ID:5) ===
- Utsukushigahara (Main Station) JOGH-DTV 18ch
- Zenkoji-daira 24ch
- Matsumoto 24ch
- Okaya-Suwa 41ch
- Ina 24ch
- Iida 33ch
- Sanada 46ch
- Yamanouchi 18ch
- Saku 21ch
