= Higashinippon Broadcasting =

JOEM-DTV
- Logo used since 2021

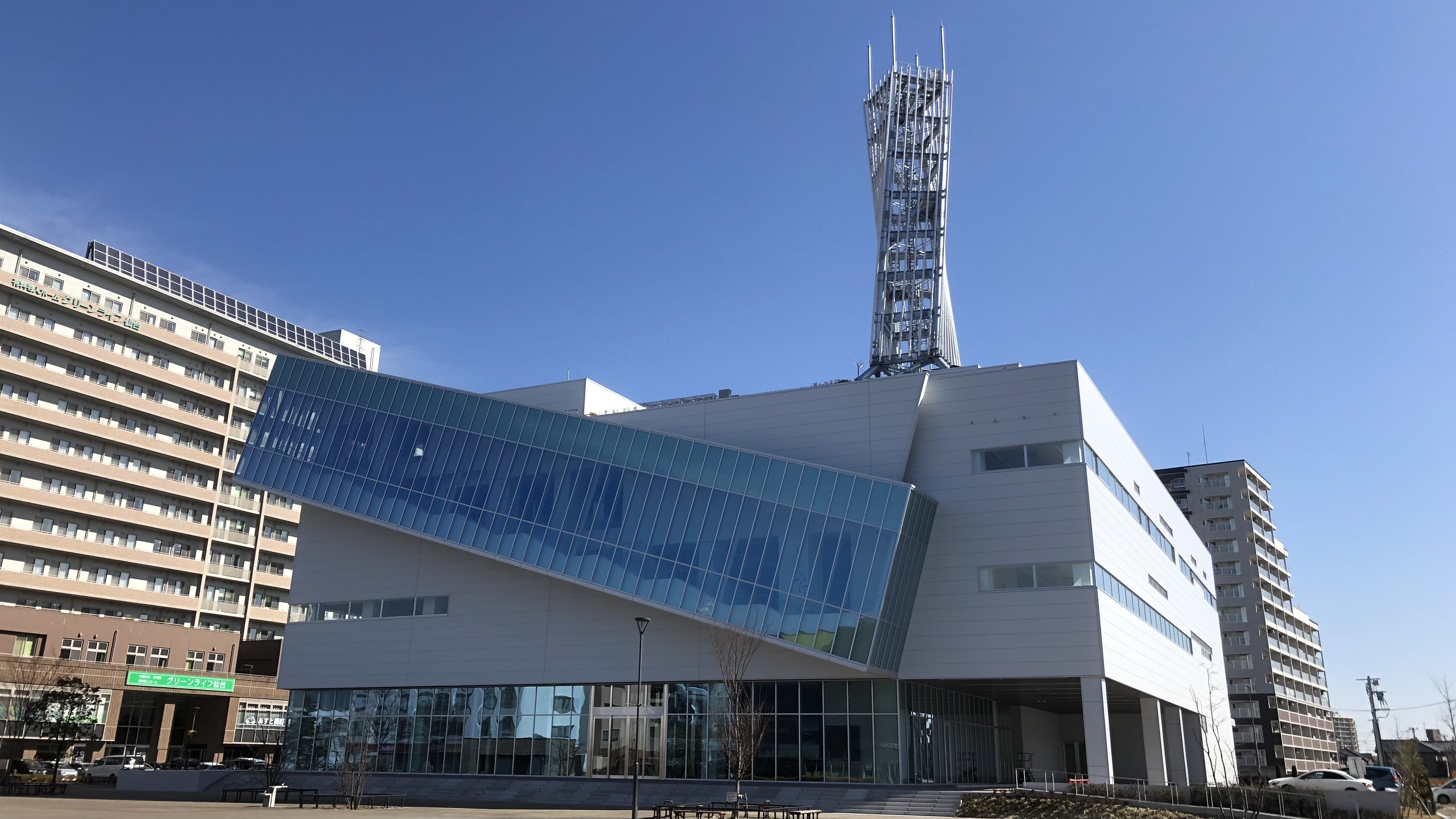
- Headquarters in Taihaku-ku, Sendai
- Miyagi Prefecture; Japan
- City: Sendai
- Channels: Digital: 28 (UHF); Virtual: 5
- Branding: Higashinippon Broadcasting; KHB

Programming
- Language: Japanese
- Affiliations: All-Nippon News Network

Ownership
- Owner: Higashinippon Broadcasting Co., Ltd.

History
- Founded: October 30, 1974
- First air date: October 1, 1975
- Former call signs: JOEM-TV (1975-2012)
- Former channel numbers: Analog: 32 (UHF, 1975–2012)
- Call sign meaning: East Japan/Miyagi (region/prefecture)

Technical information
- Licensing authority: MIC

Links
- Website: www.khb-tv.co.jp

Higashinippon Broadcasting Co., Ltd. (株式会社東日本放送, Kabushiki-gaisha Higashinippon Hōsō), also known as KHB, is a Japanese broadcast network affiliated with the ANN. Their headquarters are located in Miyagi Prefecture.

== History ==
- October 1, 1975: It was set up as Miyagi Prefecture's fourth broadcasting station.
- June 18, 2006: Their Sendai main station started their Digital terrestrial television service.
- March 11, 2011: During the 2011 Tohoku earthquake and tsunami, KHB news personnel reported NHK's unfavorable attitude in news reporting.
- March 31, 2012: All-analog TV stations were abolished.
- September 20, 2021: KHB moved to its newly built headquarters in Asuto-Nagamachi, Taihaku-ku, Sendai City from its former headquarters in Futabagaoka, Aoba-ku, Sendai City.
- September 30, 2021: After moving to its new headquarters 10 days earlier, a new company logo officially replaced the former logo that was in use since it was founded.

== Stations ==
=== Analog Stations ===
- Sendai(Main Station) JOEM-TV 32ch

=== Digital Stations(ID:5) ===
- Sendai(Main Station) JOEM-DTV 28ch
