= Kōriyama (disambiguation) =

Kōriyama is a city in Fukushima Prefecture, Japan. It can also refer to:

== Education and sports facilities ==
- Kōriyama Hirose Kaiseizan Athletic Stadium, an athletic stadium in Kōriyama, Fukushima, Japan
- Koriyama West Soccer Stadium, a soccer stadium in Kōriyama, Fukushima, Japan
- Koriyama Women's University, a private college in Kōriyama, Fukushima Prefecture, Japan
- Bandai-Atami Sports Park Koriyama Skating Rink, an open-air ice rink in Kōriyama, Fukushima Prefecture, Japan
- Horaiya Koriyama General Gymnasium, an arena in Kōriyama, Fukushima, Japan

== Historical locations ==
- Kōriyama Domain (1615-1871), a domain within Yamato Province in Japan
- Kōriyama-shuku Honjin, an Edo Period honjin complex in Ibaraki, Osaka Prefecture, Japan
- Sendai Kōriyama Kanga ruins, an archaeological site in Sendai, Miyagi Prefecture, Japan

== Municipalities ==
- Kōriyama, Kagoshima, a former town located in Hioki District, Kagoshima Prefecture, Japan
- Yamatokōriyama, a city in Nara Prefecture, Japan

== Other uses ==
- Kōriyama City Museum of Art, a museum in Kōriyama, Fukushima Prefecture, Japan
- Kōriyama explosion, a 2020 gas explosion at a shabu-shabu restaurant in Kōriyama, Fukushima Prefecture, Japan
- Naoshi Koriyama (b.1926), a Japanese poet and author

== See also ==
- Kōriyama Castle (disambiguation)
- Kōriyama Station (disambiguation) (for railway stations with this name)
