= TV-U Fukushima =

JOKI-DTV

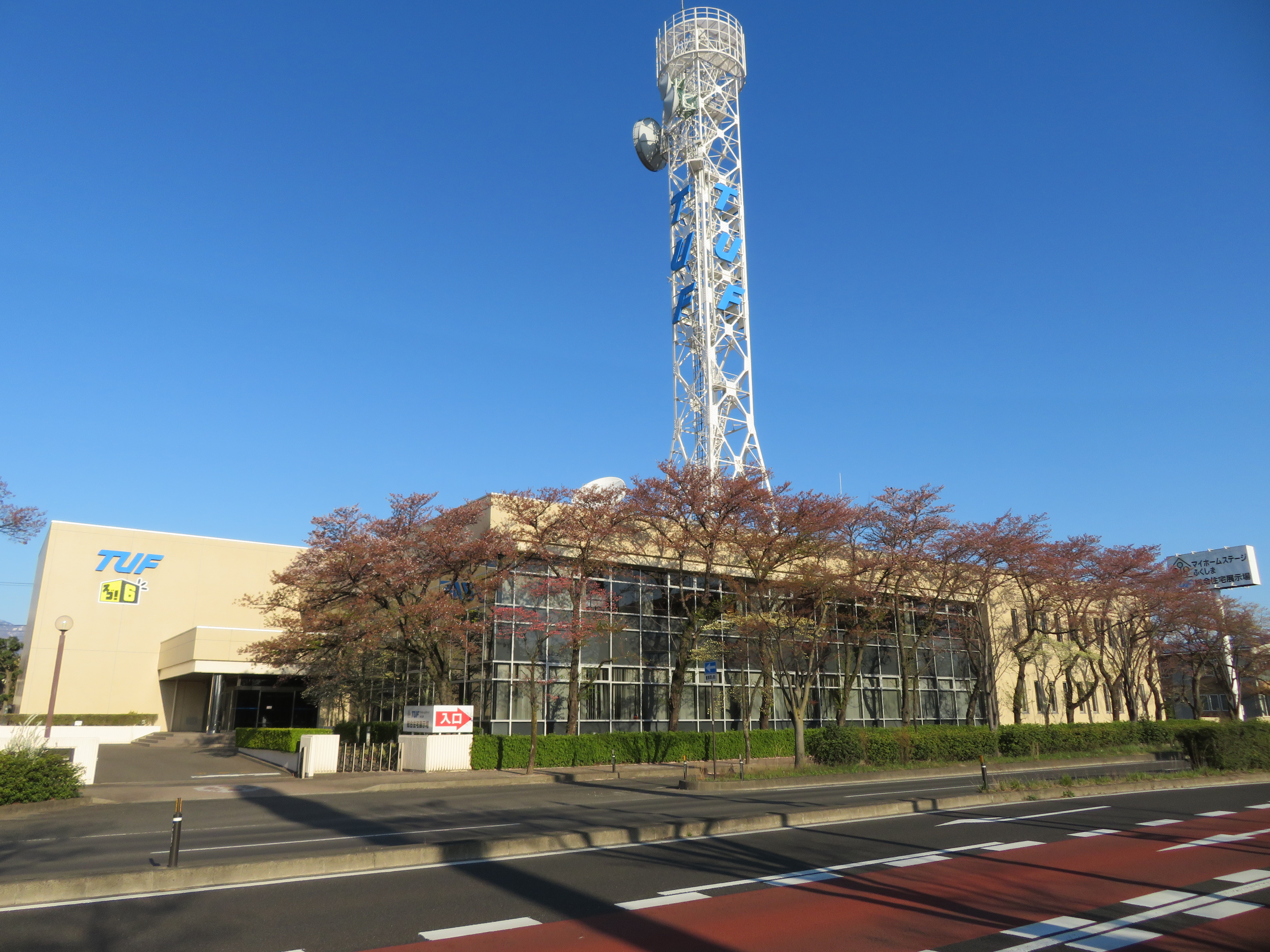
- Headquarters in Fukushima
- Fukushima Prefecture; Japan
- City: Fukushima
- Channels: Digital: 26 (UHF); Virtual: 6
- Branding: TUF; TV-U Fukushima

Programming
- Affiliations: Japan News Network

Ownership
- Owner: TV-U Fukushima, Inc.

History
- First air date: December 4, 1983
- Former call signs: JOKI-TV (1983-2012)
- Former channel numbers: 31 (Analog UHF, 1983-2012)
- Call sign meaning: From "Fukushima"

Technical information
- Licensing authority: MIC

Links
- Website: www.tuf.co.jp
- Company
- Native name: 株式会社テレビユー福島
- Romanized name: Kabushikigaisha Terebiyū Fukushima
- Type: Kabushiki gaisha
- Industry: Television broadcasting
- Founded: June 20, 1983; 43 years ago
- Headquarters: 1-1 Nishichuo, Fukushima City, Fukushima Prefecture, Japan
- Owner: TBS Holdings (11.50%); MBS Media Holdings (5.00%); The Mainichi Newspapers (5.00%)
- Website: www.tuf.co.jp
- Footnotes; Data from its Corporate Profile

TV-U Fukushima, Inc. (テレビユー福島, Terebi Yu Fukushima), also known as TUF, is a television network headquartered in Fukushima Prefecture, Japan.

TUF is the fourth commercial television broadcaster in Fukushima Prefecture, its broadcasts started on December 4, 1983. TUF is affiliated with JNN; TBS Holdings is the biggest shareholder of TUF.

== Capital composition ==
As of March 31, 2021:

Capital	Total number of shares	Shareholders
1 billion yen	20,000 shares	41

Capital	Number of shares	Percentage
TBS Television	2,300 shares	11.50%
Fukushima Minpo	2,000 shares	10.00%
TBS Holdings	1,870 shares	9.35%
Mainichi Broadcasting System Holdings	1,000 shares	5.00%
Mainichi Shimbun printing company	1,000 shares	5.00%
Toho Bank	1,000 shares	5.00%
Mizuho Bank	800 shares	4.00%
Agricultural Cooperative Central Association	800 shares	4.00%
Nobuhiro Kawawa	800 shares	4.00%
Iku Suganami	800 shares	4.00%

== Etymology ==
The name TV-U Fukushima came after a dispute in the bidding process. As described below, the license for the third UHF station was quickly taken by Fukushima Broadcasting, affiliated to TV Asahi and with capital from it and the Asahi Shimbun. However, the station was initially licensed as Fukushima Asahi Broadcasting. The Ministry of Posts and Telecommunications ruled out the inclusion of "Asahi" in the station's name, causing a dispute with the TBS plan, where the station was set to be named Fukushima Broadcasting. Ultimately, without the name Asahi attached to the ANN station, it claimed the planned name of the TBS station as theirs, prompting the new station to find a new name.

Numerous names for the station were considered:

- "Television Minami Ou" (テレビ南奥羽)
- "Daiichi Fukushima Television" (第1福島テレビ)
- "Fukushima UHF" (福島UHF)
- "New Fukushima Television" (ニュー福島テレビ)
- "Fukushima General Television" (福島総合テレビ)
- "Fukushima Prefectural Television" (福島県民テレビ)
- "Fukushima Oriental Television" (福島オリエンタルテレビ)
- "Minami Michinoku Broadcasting" (南みちのく放送)
- "Television Grand Fukushima" (テレビグランド福島)
- "Fukushima Minpo Television" (福島民報テレビ) (Fukushima Minpo bid)
- "Fukushima Minyu Television Broadcasting" (福島民友テレビ放送) (Fukushima Minyu Shimbun bid)
- "Television Fukushima Mainichi" (テレビ福島毎日) (Mainichi Shimbun bid)
- "Fukushima Mainichi Broadcasting" (福島毎日放送) (Mainichi Shimbun bid)

With no suitable name, on May 12, 1983, the name TV-U Fukushima (テレビユー福島) was decided.

== History ==
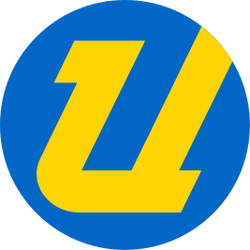
U mark (1983-1991)

TV-U Fukushima's origins lie down in the creation of Fukushima Television twenty years earlier. Due to problems merging the candidates for the station's license, FTV ended up joining the four commercial television networks of Japan in an independent manner (NTV, TBS, Fuji TV and NET). Later, with the launch of Fukushima Central Television on UHF in 1970, FTV decided to join the Fuji News Network and the Japan News Network, while FCT joined the Nippon News Network. The 1970s coincided with TBS's golden age, where the network reached its peak in ratings. In June 1971, 76.8% of FTV's programming came from TBS, while 23.2% came from Fuji TV. However, Fuji TV owned 30% of the station's shares and TBS, only 3%. This caused a contradiction between programming and capital relations. With this, TBS planned to open a station in the prefecture on its own initiative. However, as the license for the third commercial station was awarded to Fukushima Broadcasting, an ANN affiliate, TBS president Yoshiyuki Yamashima enacted a meeting in late August 1982, demanding the creation of a fourth television station in the prefecture, by speeding up the licensing process. On October 27, 1982, the Ministry of Posts and Telecommunications decided to allocate a third UHF frequency (channel 31) in Fukushima. Until the end of the license deadline, on December 20, no less than 166 companies bid for it. However, efforts to merge the bids were slow and the merger was only completed on April 11, 1983. In April 1983, aware of the preparations for the new station, Fukushima Television left TBS/JNN and became a full-on Fuji TV/FNN/FNS affiliate. On May 25, 1983, TV-U Fukushima obtained its preliminary license and held its founders' general meeting on June 17. Since the merger of the bids took longer than expected, TUF's launch, initially scheduled for October 1983, was pushed two months later to December. Construction work for the building began on June 21 and ended on November 26, eight days ahead of launching. Test broadcasts were conducted from November 22 to December 3. Prior to its launch, the station commissioned Dentsu to make its corporate identity, featuring a yellow U inside a blue circle. Said logo was in use until December 1991, after which it was retired.

At 6:58am on December 4, 1983, JOKI-TV (TUF) started broadcasting. After the station's sign-on animation, an opening speech followed at 7am followed five minutes later by Let's Talk with the Governor About Our Tomorrow. The station started with eight relay stations: Aizuwakamatsu, Iwakidaira, Mizuishi, Shirakawa, Hanawa, Takine, Haramachi and Tomioka. With its launch, Fukushima Prefecture became the tenth region in Japan to have local access to four commercial television stations, excluding spillover from adjacent prefectures. During fiscal 1984, it had a revenue of 2.83 billion yen. On May 1, 1985, the TUF Labor Union was formed. In February 1988, the station conquered the triple crown in ratings for the first time (6am-12am, 7pm-12am and 7pm-11pm). During fiscal 1987, with increased ratings, TUF hit profit for the first time, exceeding six billion yen. Revenue increased in fiscal 1989 to 3.85 billion yen and net revenue to 62 million yen. In 1992, the station was cleared from all debts since launch.

On June 1, 2006, TUF started broadcasting digital terrestrial television. Following the 2011 Tōhoku earthquake and tsunami, MIC posponed the analog shutdown date in the heavily affected prefectures (Iwate, Miyagi and Fukushima), as such, its analog signal was switched off on March 31, 2012.

== Programming ==
The station's first eneing news program was Wide U Fukushima (ワイドユー福島), which aired in the 6-6:30pm timeslot on weeknights at launch. In 1987, its ratings exceeded 10%. In 1990, Wide U Fukushima was replaced by News no Mori Fukushima (ニュースの森ふくしま), following the network's pattern. Since 2016, its evening news program is NSta Fukushima (Nスタふくしま)

In 1984, TUF produced its first music program, Sound Peach (サウンドビーチ) and the daily program Hello From the Corner (街角からのこんにちは). Sound Beach extended its length in 1986 from just ten minutes to a full hour. In 1987, it assisted in the production of two editions of the TBS-produced The Best Ten. Since 2021, its daily entertainment program is Chan6 (ちゃんろく。). Fukushima SHOW (ふくしまSHOW) is the station's only large-scale evening entertainment program.
