= Cancer Cell International =

- Discipline: Biology
- Language: English
- Edited by: Domenico Coppola, Yasumasa Kato

Publication details
- History: 2001–present
- Publisher: Springer Science+Business Media
- Impact factor: 6.436 (2021)

Standard abbreviations
- ISO 4: Cancer Cell Int.

Indexing
- ISSN: 1475-2867

Links
- Journal homepage; Online archive

Cancer Cell International is a peer-reviewed scientific journal that publishes papers on various aspects of cancer cell. The journal was established in 2001 and is published by Springer Science+Business Media.

== Editorial process and journal scope ==
Cancer Cell International is an open-access, online-only journal which publishes articles focused on cancer cell.

Journal publishes also articles on cancer studies with the data from experiments. Publish research articles based on data in many fields, from cell proliferation to apoptosis, etc.

As of 2022 editors-in-Chief are Domenico Coppola from Moffitt Cancer Center and Yasumasa Kato from Ohu University.

== Abstracting and indexing ==
The journal is abstracted and indexed for example in:

- Biological Abstracts
- DOAJ
- PubMed
- PubMed Central
- Science Citation Index Expanded
- SCImago
- Scopus
- Web of Science
- Zetoc

According to the Journal Citation Reports, the journal has a 2021 impact factor of 6.436.
