= Kōriyama Station =

Kōriyama Station is the name of multiple train stations in Japan:

- Kōriyama Station (Fukushima), JR East station in Koriyama, Fukushima Prefecture
- Kōriyama Station (Nara), JR West station in Yamato-Koriyama, Nara Prefecture
- Kintetsu Kōriyama Station, Kintetsu station in Yamato-Koriyama, Nara Prefecture
- Kōriyamatomita Station, JR East station in Kōriyama, Fukushima Prefecture

== See also ==
- Kōriyama (disambiguation)
- Kōriyama Castle (disambiguation)
