= 本宮駅 =

本宮駅 may refer to:

- Hongū Station
- Motomiya Station
