= Kōriyama Castle (disambiguation) =

Kōriyama Castle (郡山城) is a castle in Yamatokōriyama, Nara Prefecture, Japan.

Kōriyama Castle may also refer to:

- Kōriyama Castle (Ibaraki), a castle ruin in Ibaraki, Osaka Prefecture, Japan
- Kōriyama Castle (Iwate), also known as Kōsuiji Castle (高水寺城), a castle ruin in Shiwa, Iwate Prefecture, Japan
- Kōriyama Castle (Kagoshima), a castle in Kagoshima Prefecture, Japan
- Kōriyama Castle (Kōriyama), a castle ruin in Kōriyama, Fukushima Prefecture, Japan
- Kōriyama Castle (Ōnan), a castle in Ōnan, Shimane Prefecture, Japan

== See also ==
- Yoshida-Kōriyama Castle (吉田郡山城), also known as Aki-Kōriyama Castle (安芸郡山城), a castle in Akitakata, Hiroshima Prefecture, Japan
- Kōriyama (disambiguation)
