= 0U =

0U (zero U) or 0-U may refer to:

- 0U, one of several Power Distribution Unit models for IBM products
- 0u+, a potential ground state in Electron spectroscopy

== See also ==
- U0 (disambiguation)
- OU (disambiguation)
