= OU =

OU or Ou or ou may stand for:

== Universities ==
=== United States ===
- Oakland University in Oakland County, Michigan
- Oakwood University in Huntsville, Alabama
- Oglethorpe University in Atlanta, Georgia
- Ohio University in Athens, Ohio
- Olivet University in San Francisco, California
- University of Oklahoma in Norman, Oklahoma

=== Japan ===
- Osaka University, a national research university
- Okayama University, a national university
- Onomichi City University, a public university in Hiroshima Prefecture
- Otemae University, a private university in Hyogo Prefecture
- Ohu University, a private university in Fukushima Prefecture

=== Other countries ===
- Hong Kong Metropolitan University, Hong Kong, previously the Open University of Hong Kong
- Osnabrück University, Germany
- Open University, United Kingdom
- Open University of Mauritius, Mauritius
- Osmania University, India
- University of Otago, New Zealand
- University of Ottawa, Canada
- University of Oxford, United Kingdom

== Language and writing ==
- Ou (digraph)
- Ou (ligature), the ligature ȣ in the Latin and Greek alphabets
- Uk (Cyrillic), the Cyrillic letter Ꙋ, derived from the ou ligature
- OU, an abbreviation for Old Ukrainian, an aspect of the Ruthenian language from the 11th to the 14th century

== Surnames ==
- Ō (surname), anglicized as Oh and often romanized as Ou, (王), a Japanese family name
- Ou (surname) (區 or 歐), a Chinese family name

== Geography ==
- Nam Ou, a river in Laos
- Ōu (奥羽), a synonym of Tōhoku region, Japan
  - Ōu Mountains
  - Ōu Main Line
  - Ohu University

== Organizations ==
- Croatia Airlines (IATA code OU)
- Orthodox Union (Union of Orthodox Jewish Congregations of America)
- Our Ukraine (political party)

== Other uses ==
- ʻŌʻū, a bird (Psittirostra psittacea)
- oculi uterque, Latin for both eyes, in eyeglass prescriptions
- Organizational Unit in computing, particularly in the Lightweight Directory Access Protocol (LDAP)
- Over unity, a phrase related to perpetual motion
- "Overused", in competitive Pokémon tiering
- One Utama, or 1 Utama
