= Toru Iwaya =

Japanese mezzotint engraver and painter (born 1936)

Tōru Iwaya
- Born: 岩谷徹; February 12, 1936 (age 90); Koriyama, Japan
- Known for: Mezzotint, Engraving, Painting, Drawing, Printmaking

Tōru Iwaya (岩谷 徹, Iwaya Tōru; born February 12, 1936) is a Japanese mezzotint engraver and painter.

== Biography ==
Born in Koriyama, Japan in 1936, the youngest child of Iwaya Kanekichi and Kageyama Matsu, Tōru Iwaya went, at the age of 19, to Tokyo. After he graduated from the Tokyo Fisheries (東京水産), now called Tokyo University of Marine Science and Technology (東京海洋大学), at the age of 24, he moved back to Koriyama, where in 1965 at the age of 29 he married Keiko Sugano. He undertook his artistic studies at the Nippon Design School and at Fukushima University (福島大学, Fukushima daigaku). In 1971 at the age of 35 he moved to Paris. There he studied under Stanley William Hayter at his studio Atelier 17. In 1974 he exhibited some of his mezzotint works at the Galerie Genot in the Marais near his own workshop.

Tōru Iwaya went back to Koriyama in 1999 due to his wife's deteriorating health and his sister's mental illness. He continues his work and has begun teaching his techniques to young students at his workshop.

== Awards ==
- Société des Artistes Français: bronze medal, 1972

== Bibliography ==
- Adamson, John, "John and the Marais copper-engraver" in Adamson, John, and Clive Jackson, Footloose in France, Cambridge: John Adamson, 2023, ISBN 978-1-898565-18-5, pp. 145–9
- Uematsu, Hajime (ed.), Mezzotints by Tōru Iwaya, with foreword by Masami Ono and introduction by Teizo Taki. Tokyo: Oscar Art Co. Ltd
