= Big-i =

Japanese skyscraper

Coordinates: 37°23′59″N 140°23′17″E

Kōriyama Big-i
- 郡山ビッグアイ
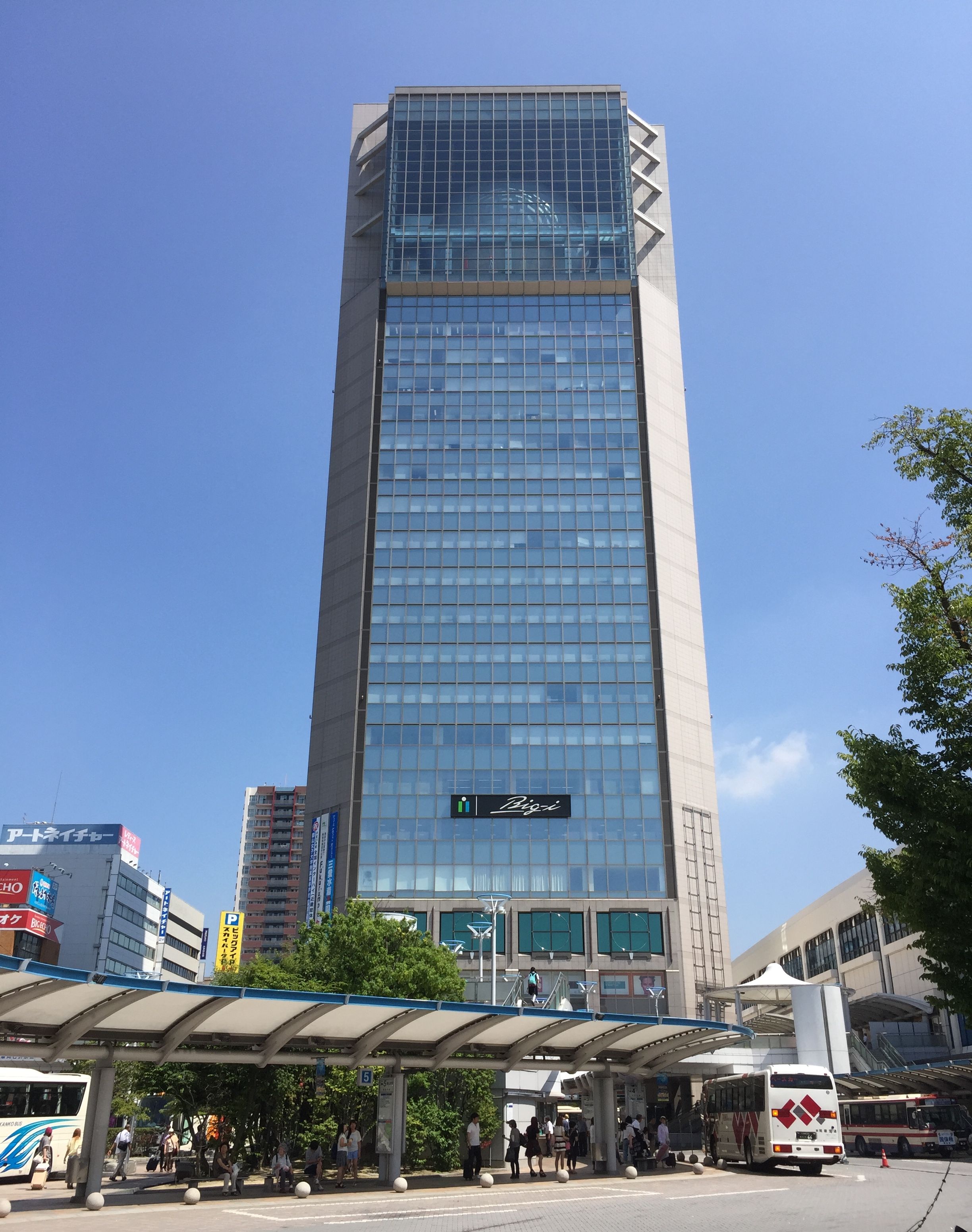

- Location within Fukushima Prefecture Location within Japan

General information
- Location: Kōriyama, Fukushima, Japan
- Completed: March 2001

Height
- Height: 133 metres (436 ft)

Technical details
- Floor count: 24

Website
- Official website

The Big-i (郡山ビッグアイ, Kōriyama Biggu Ai) is a skyscraper located in Kōriyama, Fukushima Prefecture, Japan. Construction of the 133-metre, 24-storey skyscraper was finished in 2001. It connects to the JR Kōriyama Station.
