= U0 =

U0 may refer to:

- Ultra Air (former IATA code: U0), a former Colombian low-cost airline
- N53B30-U0, a 3.0-litre model of the BMW N53 engine released in September 2007
- Oberursel U.0, an engine equipping the 1915 German Fokker E.II fighter aircraft
- Vacuum permeability (μ_{0}), a constant in physics

== See also ==
- 0U (disambiguation)
