= Fukushima Broadcasting =

Fukushima Broadcasting Co., Ltd.

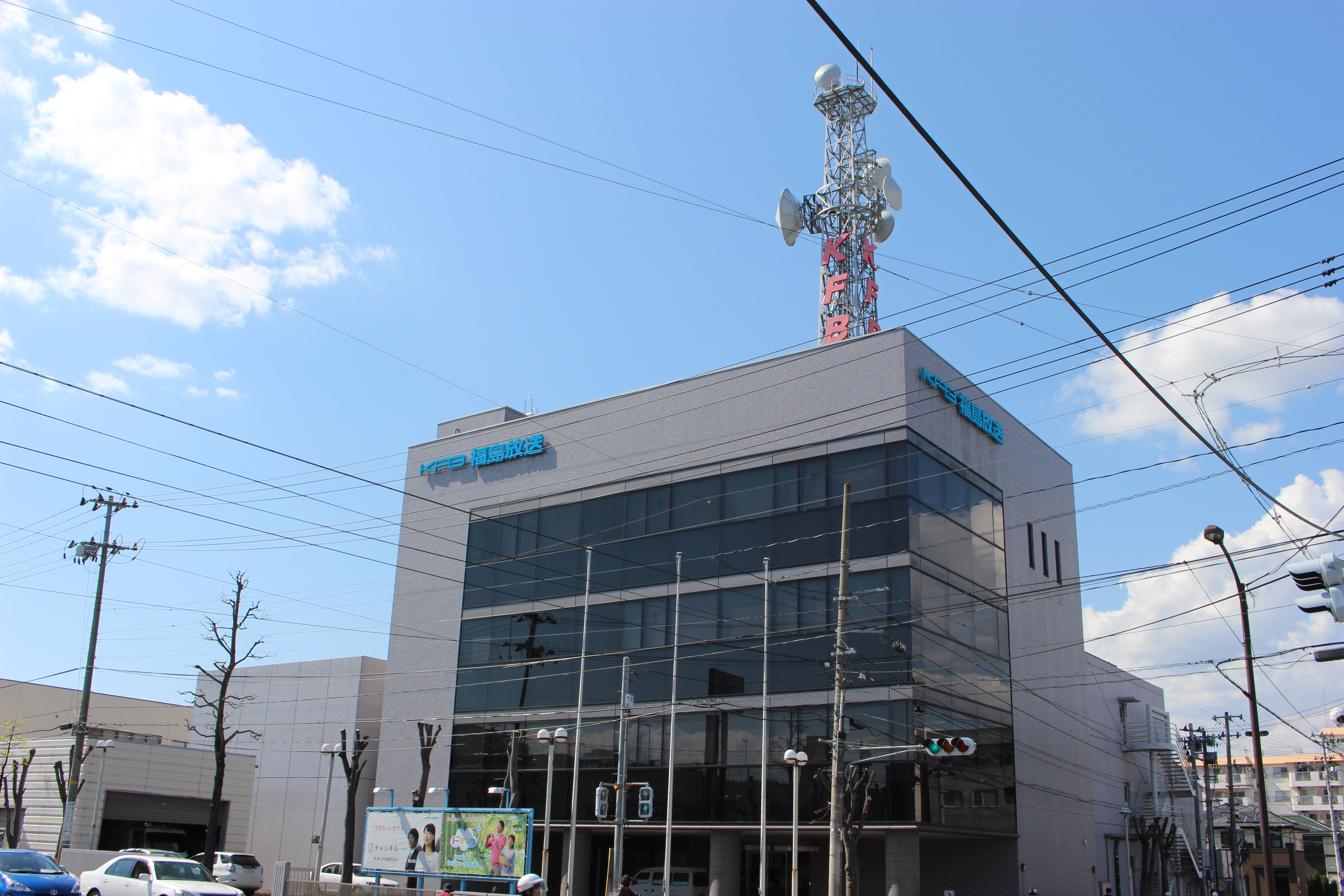
- Trade name: KFB
- Native name: 株式会社福島放送
- Romanized name: Kabushikigaisha Fukushimahōsō
- Company type: Kabushiki gaisha
- Industry: Television broadcasting
- Founded: February 4, 1981; 45 years ago
- Headquarters: 4-3-6 Kuwano, Koriyama City, Fukushima Prefecture, Japan
- Key people: Hiroshi Yokoyama (President and Representative Director)
- Website: www.kfb.co.jp
- Footnotes / references Data from its Corporate Profile

JOJI-DTV
- Fukushima Prefecture; Japan
- City: Koriyama
- Channels: Digital: 29 (UHF); Virtual: 5
- Branding: KFB; Fukushima Broadcasting

Programming
- Affiliations: All-Nippon News Network

Ownership
- Owner: Fukushima Broadcasting Co., Ltd.

History
- First air date: October 1, 1981
- Former call signs: JOJI-TV (1981–2012)
- Former channel numbers: Analog: 35 (UHF; 1981–2012)

Technical information
- Licensing authority: MIC

Fukushima Broadcasting Co., Ltd. (株式会社福島放送, Kabushiki-gaisha Fukushima Hōsō), also known as KFB, is a Japanese broadcast network affiliated with the ANN. Their headquarters are located in Kōriyama City, Fukushima Prefecture.

== History ==
=== Pre-launch ===
Prior to its launch, there were already 2 stations set up in the prefecture: Fukushima Television (affiliated to Fuji TV, TV Asahi, and TBS) and Fukushima Central TV (affiliated to NTV). In June 1980, the Ministry of Posts (now known as the Ministry of Internal Affairs and Communications) opened applications for Fukushima's third private broadcaster, attracting 112 companies. After talks between the four main commercial networks in Japan and Radio Fukushima in December 1980, it was agreed that the affiliate for the new station would be from TV Asahi.

Both TV Asahi and TBS, which were interested in applying for a broadcast license, hoped to use "Fukushima Broadcasting" as a tentative name for the new regional broadcaster. Later, TV Asahi made plans to either use "Fukushima Asahi Broadcasting" or "Fukushima Asahi Television" as its names, but neither name was approved by the Ministry of Posts. On December 19 of the same year, the new broadcaster obtained a license under the name Fukushima Broadcasting.

Fukushima Broadcasting chose Koriyama City as the location of its headquarters as Koriyama is the largest economic city in the prefecture. On February 4, 1981, the broadcaster was founded.

=== Launching and further developments ===
After its headquarters completed on August 10, 1981, pilot broadcasts began on September 15 of the same year. At 6:20am on October 1, 1981, Fukushima Broadcasting started its broadcasting operations. The broadcaster also entered into event sponsorships such as Fukushima Summer Festival and NASA Space Science Expo. In addition, the broadcaster also held cultural activities such as the performing of the Vienna Boys' Choir in the prefecture.

When TV-U Fukushima started broadcasting in 1983, Fukushima already had 4 commercial broadcasters in the prefecture.In 1985, a broadcasting union was established. KFB first used the electronic news-gathering system in 1989. In order to update the main control room equipment, KFB began to renovate the headquarters in 1997. This series of works was completed in April 1998. On September 6, 1998, a mechanical failure occurred at the Fukushima Broadcasting Aizuwakamatsu broadcasting station, causing about 87,500 households in the Aizu area to be unable to watch the Fukushima Broadcasting program for 8.5 hours.
