= Gohyakugawa Station =

Railway station in Motomiya, Fukushima Prefecture, Japan

Gohyakugawa Station 五百川駅
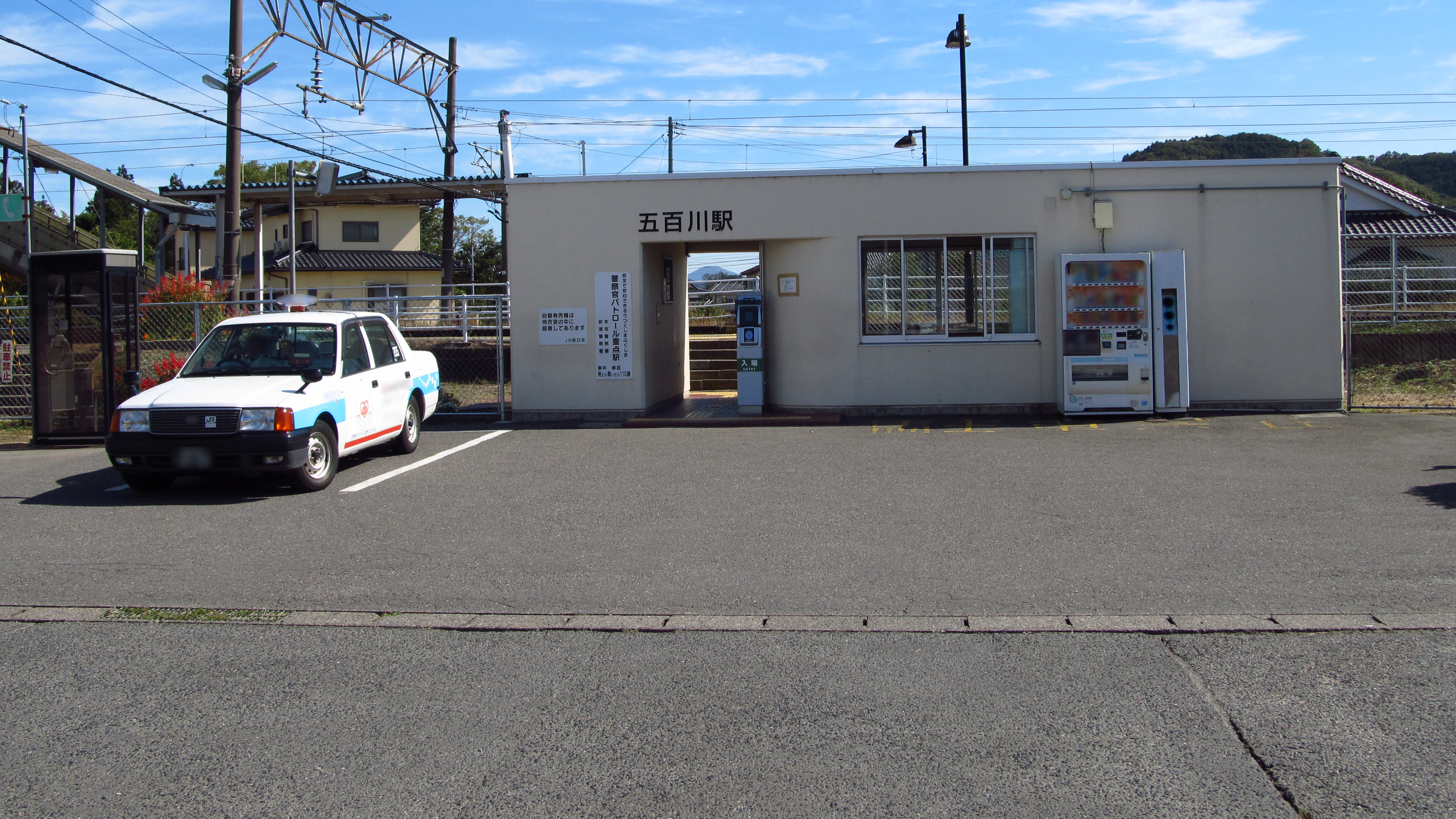
- Gohyakugawa Station in October 2015

General information
- Location: Arai Shinsuke, Motomiya-shi, Fukushima-ken 969-1104; Japan
- Coordinates: 37.4828°N 140.3877°E
- Operator: JR East
- Line: ■ Tōhoku Main Line
- Distance: 236.9 km from Tokyo
- Platforms: 2 side platforms
- Tracks: 2

Other information
- Status: Unstaffed
- Website: Official website

History
- Opened: December 15, 1948

Services
Preceding station	JR East	Following station
Hiwada towards Kuroiso	Tōhoku Main Line Local	Motomiya towards Morioka
Location
- Location within Fukushima Prefecture Location within Japan

Gohyakugawa Station (五百川駅, Gohyakugawa-eki) is a railway station in the city of Motomiya, Fukushima Prefecture, Japan, operated by East Japan Railway Company (JR East).

== Lines ==
Gohyakugawa Station is served by the Tōhoku Main Line, and is located 236.9 kilometers from the official starting point of the line at Tokyo.

== Station layout ==
The station has two opposed side platforms. The station is unattended.

=== Platforms ===
1	■ Tōhoku Main Line	for Fukushima, and Sendai
3	■ Tōhoku Main Line	for Kōriyama

== History ==
Gohyakugawa Station opened on December 15, 1948. The station was absorbed into the JR East network upon the privatization of the Japanese National Railways (JNR) on April 1, 1987.

== Surrounding area ==
- Asahi Beer Fukushima factory
- National Route 4

== See also ==
- List of railway stations in Japan
