= Bandai-Atami Sports Park Koriyama Skating Rink =

Japanese skating rink

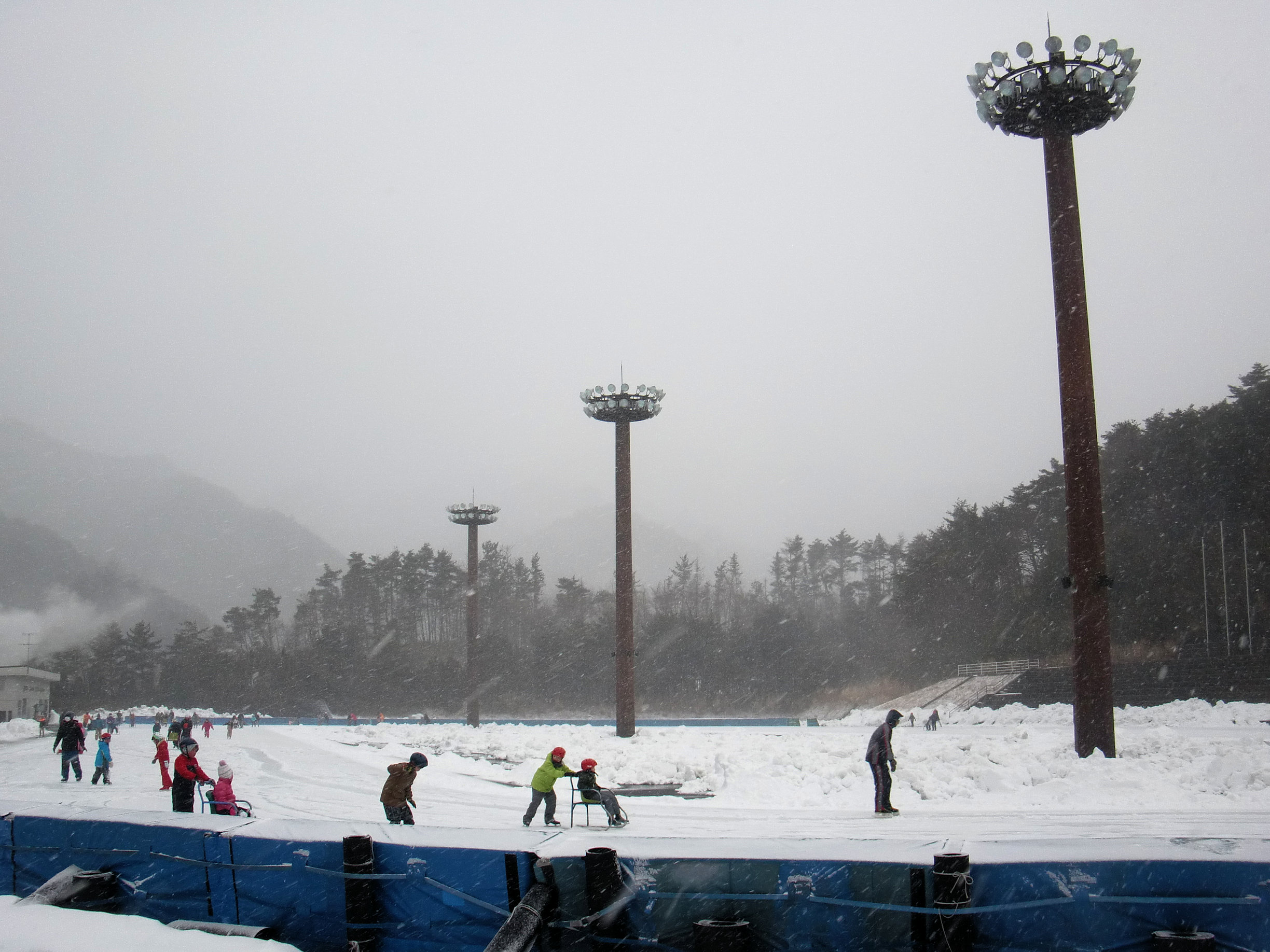

- Location within Japan
- Address: 〒963-1302, 2-7 Minami-Dorobusawa, Takatama, Atami-machi, Koriyama City, Fukushima Prefecture (〒963-1302 福島県郡山市熱海町高玉南泥布沢２−７)
- Location: Koriyama City
- Coordinates: 37°29′11″N 140°16′38″E
- Capacity: 1.115
- Type: Ice Skating Rink
- Surface: 39,000 m2
- Field size: 400 m

Construction
- Opened: 1993

The Bandai-Atami Sports Park Koriyama Skating Rink (磐梯熱海スポーツパーク郡山スケート場, Bandai Atami supōtsupāku Kōriyama sukēto-jō) is an open-air ice rink in the city of Kōriyama in Fukushima prefecture in Japan. It was opened in 1993 for the National Sports Festival of Japan (Kokutai) in Fukushima in 1995. It is located at 340 meters above sea level. The track serves as a roller-skating rink during the summer.

Every year the so-called Tsururinko festival takes place on the first Sunday of December, with the main attraction being a tug-of-war on skates.

== Track records ==
These are the current track records at the Koriyama Skating Rink.

Men
Distance	Time	Skater	Date
500 m	36.98	(Japan) Takaaki Matsuo	21.12.2008
1000 m	1:15.55	(Japan) Shane Williamson	22.12.2012
1500 m	1:59.07	(Japan) Shane Williamson	23.12.2012
3000 m	4:16.94	(Japan) Yuuto Takaishi	24.12.2012
5000 m	6:55.66	(Japan) Norimasa Zaike	21.12.2008
10000 m	15:10.80	(Japan) Seitaro Otouge	07.12.2002
2 x 500 m	77,040	(Japan) Wataru Morishige	23.12.2016

Women
Distance	Time	Skater	Date
500 m	42.82	(Japan) Ayane Kida	24.12.2016
1000 m	1:25.25	(Japan) Miki Fujimori	23.12.2016
1500 m	2:12.96	(Japan) Ayaka Mizusawa	09.02.2013
3000 m	4:39.25	(Japan) Anna Suzuki	25.12.2016
5000 m	8:16.58	(Japan) Daigo Watanabe	24.12.2016
2 x 500 m	86,690	(Japan) Rena Akita	23.12.2016
