= Hiwada Station =

Railway station in Kōriyama, Fukushima Prefecture, Japan

Hiwada Station 日和田駅
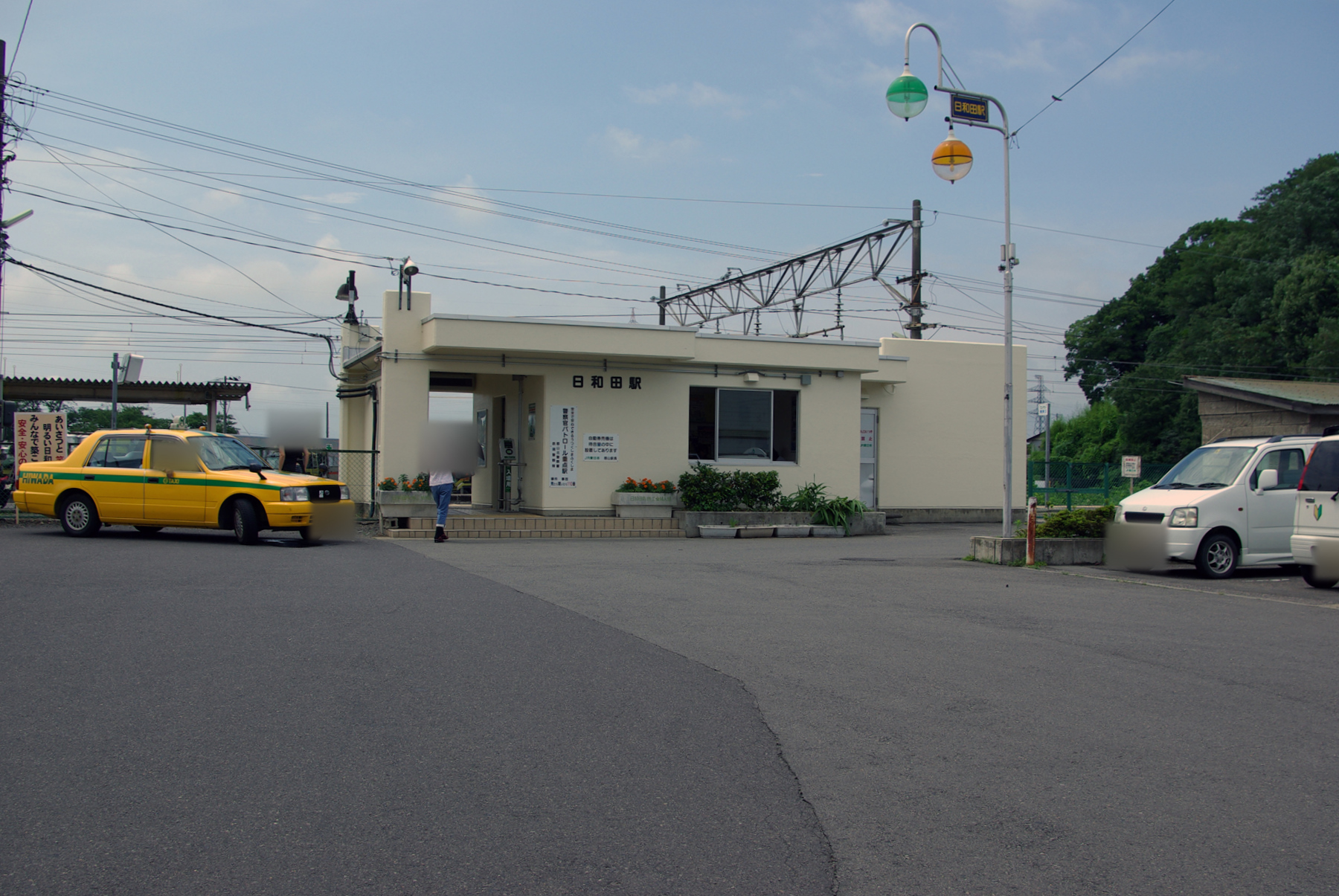
- Hiwada Station in July 2009

General information
- Location: Hiwada-machi Obitsu 42, Kōriyama, Fukushima-ken 963-0534; Japan
- Coordinates: 37.4462°N 140.3885°E
- Operator: JR East
- Line: ■ Tōhoku Main Line
- Distance: 232.4 km from Tokyo
- Platforms: 1 island + 1 side platforms
- Tracks: 3

Other information
- Status: Unstaffed
- Website: Official website

History
- Opened: June 1, 1897

Passengers

Services
Preceding station	JR East	Following station
Kōriyama towards Kuroiso	Tōhoku Main Line Local	Gohyakugawa towards Morioka
Location
- Location within Fukushima Prefecture Location within Japan

Hiwada Station (日和田駅, Hiwada-eki) is a railway station in the city of Kōriyama, Fukushima Prefecture, Japan operated by East Japan Railway Company (JR East).

== Lines ==
Hiwada Station is served by the Tōhoku Main Line, and is located 232.4 rail kilometers from the official starting point of the line at Tokyo.

== Station layout ==
The station has two opposed side platforms connected to the station building by a footbridge. The station is unattended.

=== Platforms ===
1	■ Tōhoku Main Line	for Kōriyama
2	■ Tōhoku Main Line	for Fukushima

== History ==
Hiwada Station opened on June 1, 1897. The station was absorbed into the JR East network upon the privatization of the Japanese National Railways (JNR) on April 1, 1987.

== Surrounding area ==
- National Route 4

== See also ==
- List of railway stations in Japan
