= Motomiya Station =

Railway station in Motomiya, Fukushima Prefecture, Japan

Motomiya Station 本宮駅
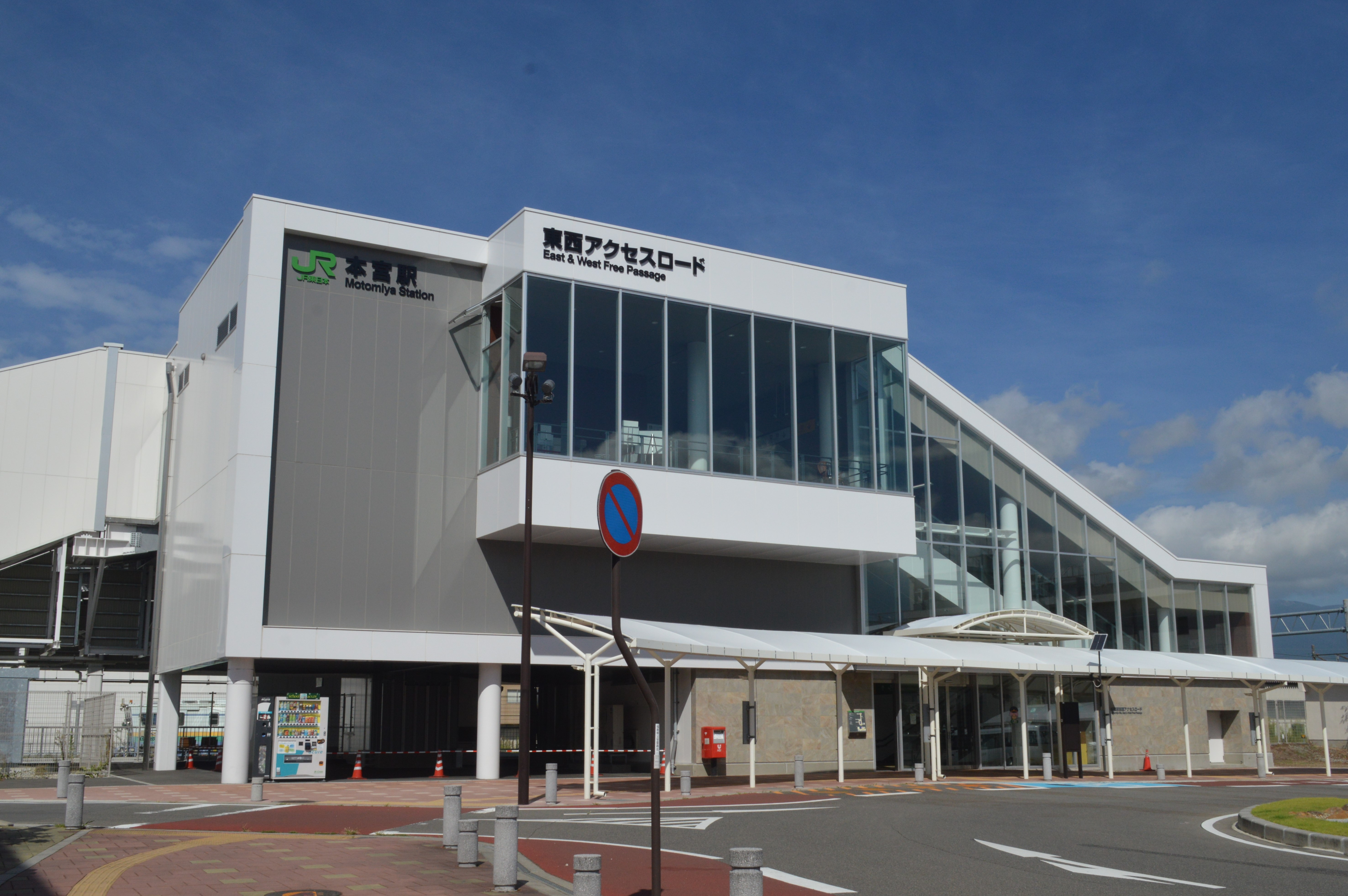
- Motomiya Station East Exit in 2023

General information
- Location: Motomiya Kunawa 25, Motomiya-shi, Fukushima-ken 969-1100; Japan
- Coordinates: 37°30′51″N 140°23′58″E
- Operator: JR East
- Line: ■ Tōhoku Main Line
- Distance: 240.7 km from Tokyo
- Platforms: 1 island + 1 side platforms
- Tracks: 3

Other information
- Status: Staffed ("Midori no Madoguchi")
- Website: Official website

History
- Opened: December 15, 1887

Passengers
- FY2018: 1797 (daily)

Services
Preceding station	JR East	Following station
Gohyakugawa towards Kuroiso	Tōhoku Main Line Local	Sugita towards Morioka
Location
- Location within Fukushima Prefecture Location within Japan

Motomiya Station (本宮駅, Motomiya-eki) is a railway station in Motomiya, Fukushima Prefecture, Japan operated by East Japan Railway Company (JR East).

== Lines ==
Motomiya Station is served by the Tōhoku Main Line, and is located 240.7 rail kilometers from the official starting point of the line at Tokyo.

== Station layout ==
The station has one island platform and one side platform connected to the station building by a footbridge. The station has a Midori no Madoguchi staffed ticket office.

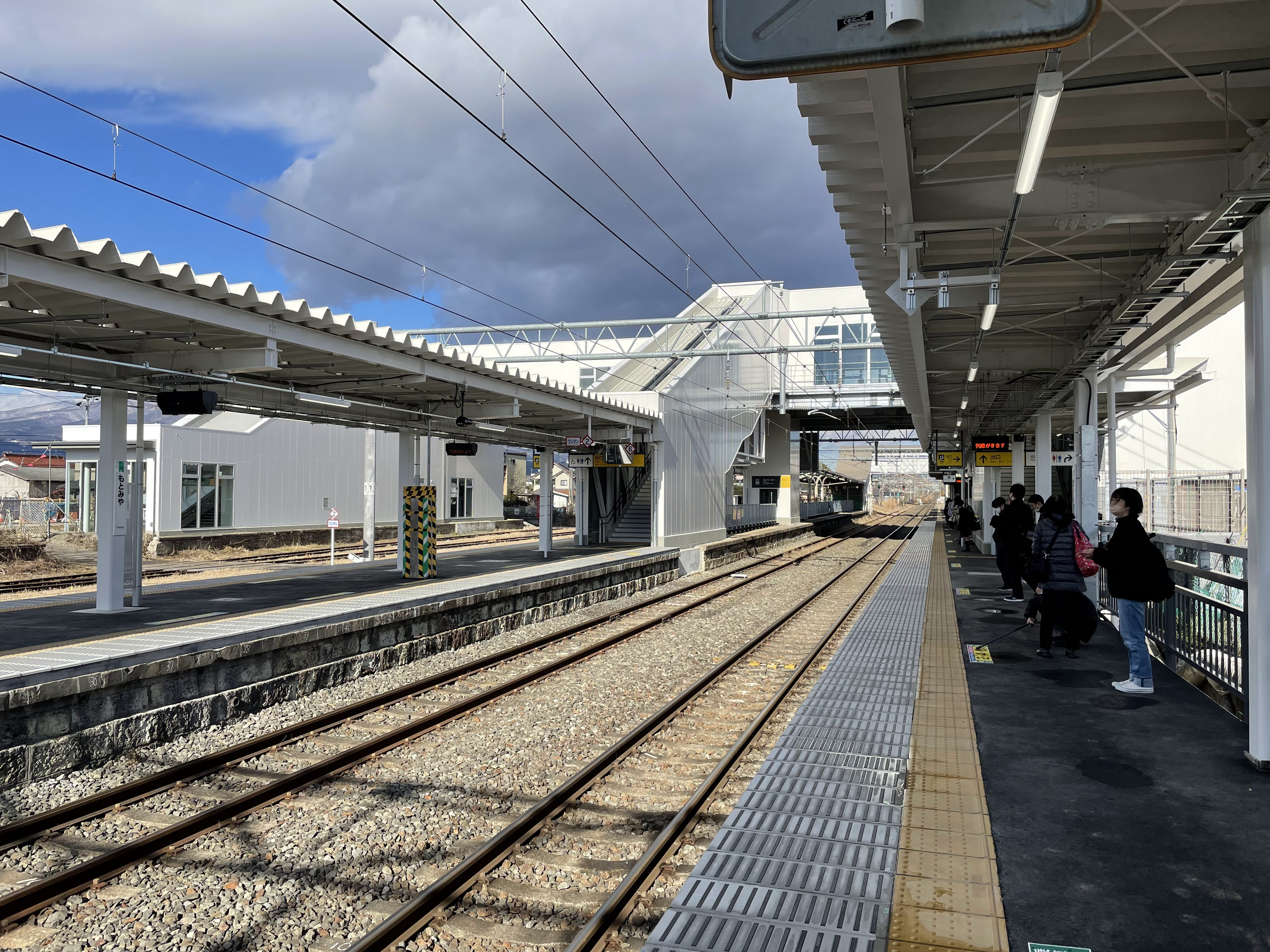
Platform

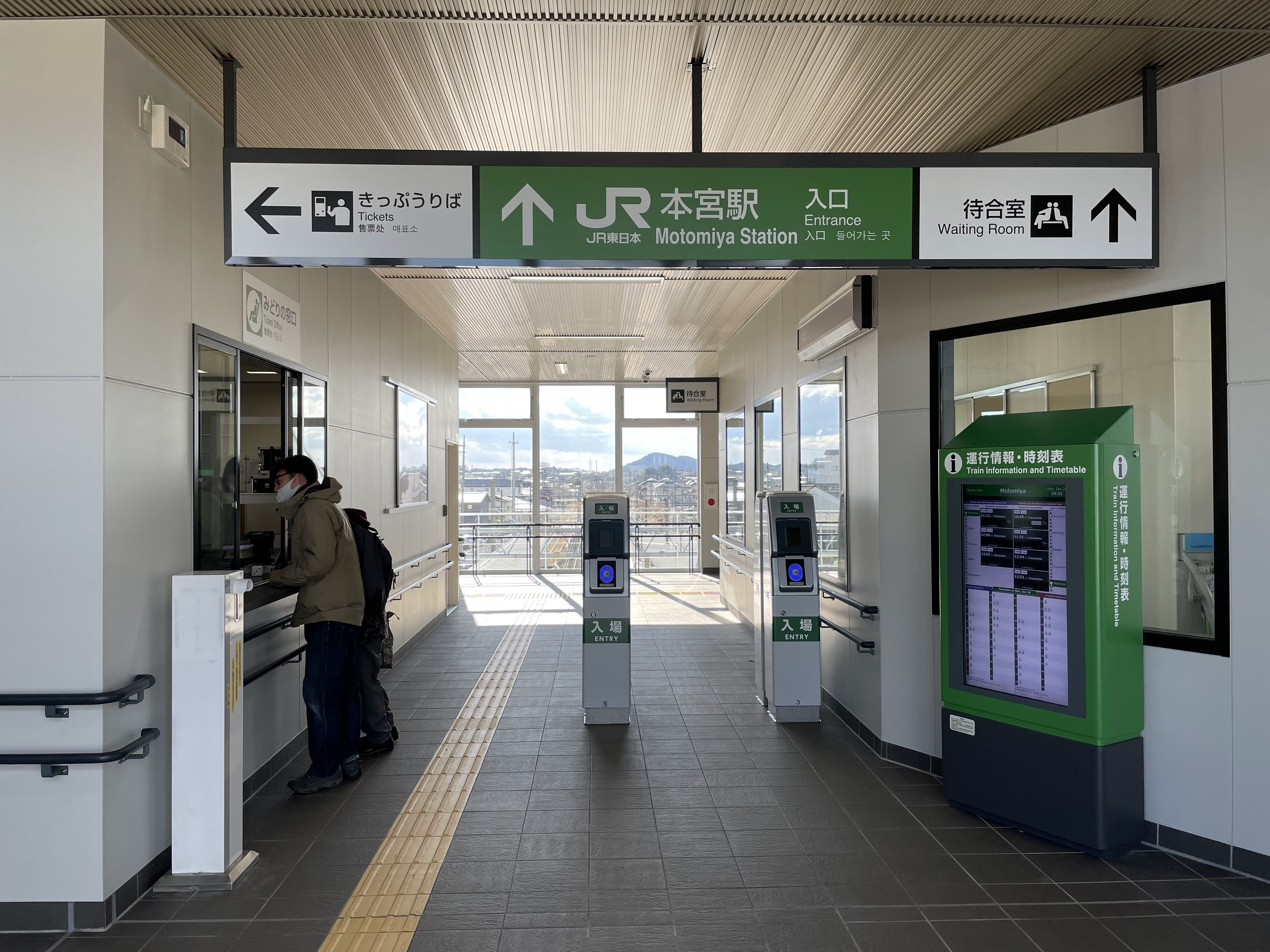
Ticket gates

=== Platforms ===
1	■ Tōhoku Main Line	for Kōriyama, and Shirakawa
2	■ Tōhoku Main Line	for Kōriyama and Shirakawa for Fukushima and Shiroishi
3	■ Tōhoku Main Line	for Fukushima and Shiroishi

== History ==
Motomiya Station opened on December 15, 1887. The station was absorbed into the JR East network upon the privatization of the Japanese National Railways (JNR) on April 1, 1987.

== Passenger statistics ==
In fiscal 2018, the station was used by an average of 1,797 passengers daily (boarding passengers only).

== Surrounding area ==
- Motomiya City Hall
- Motomiya Post office
- National Route 4
- Abukuma River

== See also ==
- List of railway stations in Japan
