= Kōriyama Castle (Ibaraki) =

Former castle in Ibaraki, Osaka Prefecture, Japan

- 郡山城
- Ibaraki, Osaka Prefecture, Japan
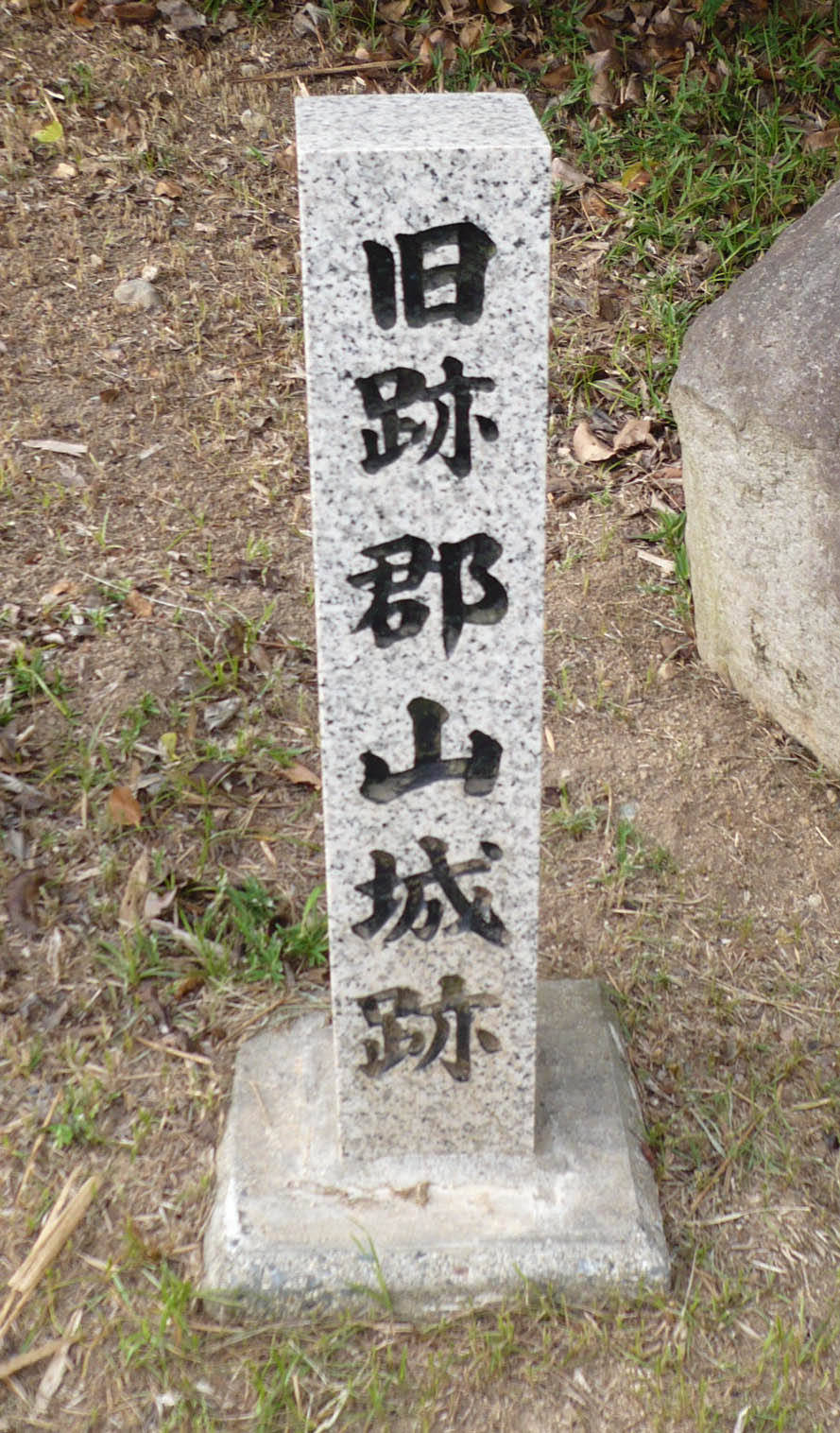
- Marker showing where the castle used to be.

Site information
- Type: Japanese castle
- Controlled by: Ōmiwada clan
- Open to the public: yes
- Condition: only some stones and stone walls remain

Location
- Coordinates: 34°49′56.142″N 135°33′8.885″E

Site history
- Built: unknown
- Built by: Toyotomi Hideyoshi (renovations)
- Demolished: unknown

Garrison information
- Past commanders: Kōri Masanobu; Toyotomi Hideyoshi

Kōriyama Castle (郡山城, Kōriyama-jō) was a Japanese castle in Ibaraki, Osaka Prefecture, Japan. It is unknown when the castle was originally built or when it was destroyed. The marker and sign indicating where the castle was are at the side of a public road.

== History ==
The exact years when Kōriyama Castle was built and abandoned are unclear in the historical record. Some records indicate Toyotomi Hideyoshi possibly built it, as well as renovating during the Siege of Itami around 1579. The lord of Kōriyama Castle was Kōri Masanobu, who was a retainer of Wada Koremasa, the lord of Takatsuki Castle. Kōri, as part of Wada's forces, participated in the Battle of Shiraigawara near the castle in 1571 and was killed. The chronicles of Oda Nobunaga state that he traveled to the castle as part of a military campaign.

== Works cited ==
- 豊田裕章 (Hiroaki Toyoda (November 2010). 茨木城から歴史を展望する [Looking at the History from Ibaraki Castle] (in Japanese). 茨木市立文化資料館.
