= Fukushima Central Television =

JOVI-DTV
- Logo used since 2020

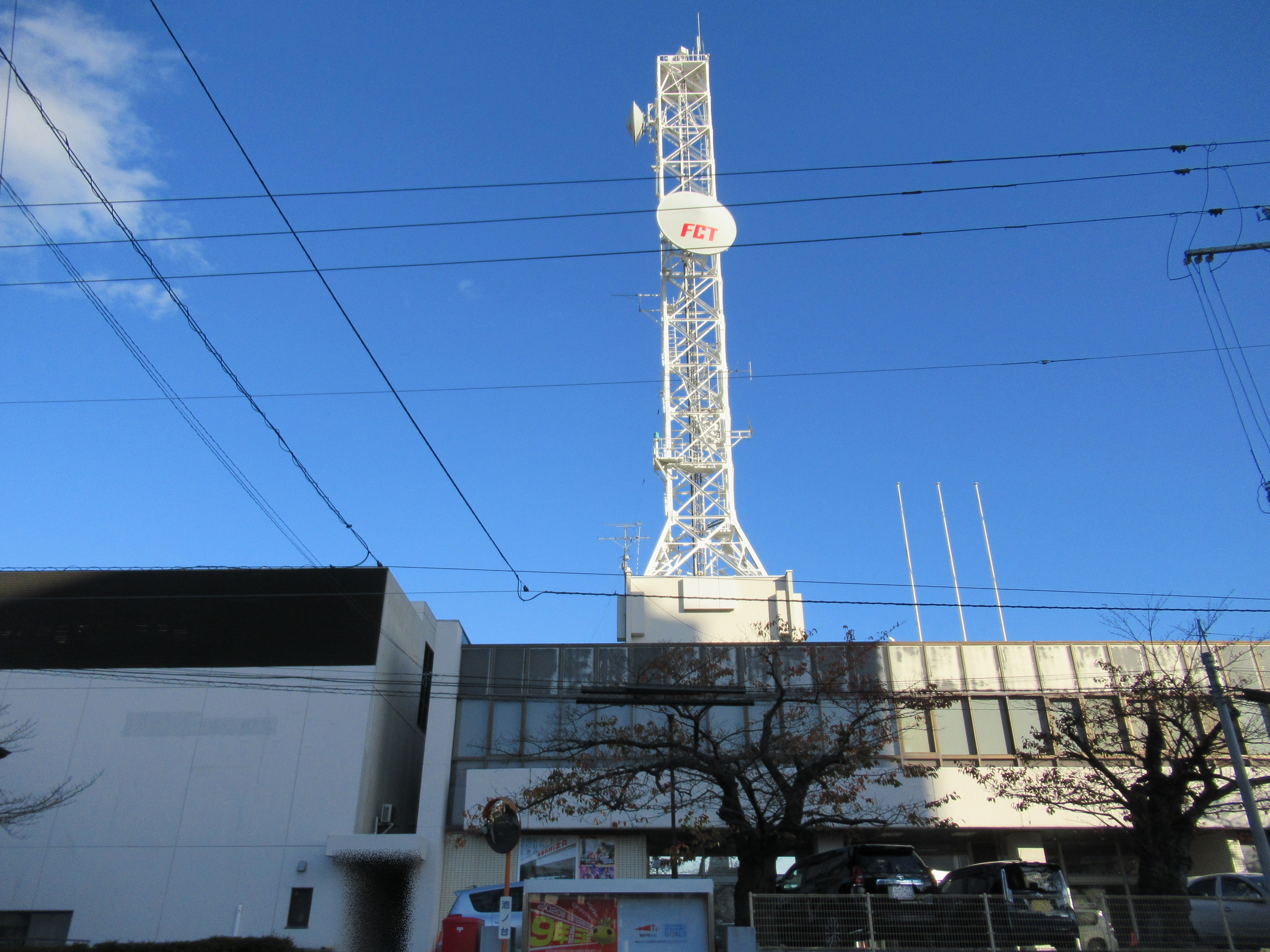
- Headquarters in Ikenodai, Kōriyama
- Fukushima Prefecture; Japan
- City: Koriyama
- Channels: Digital: 27 (UHF); Virtual: 4
- Branding: Fukushima Central Television; FCT

Programming
- Language: Japanese
- Affiliations: Nippon News Network and Nippon Television Network System

Ownership
- Owner: Fukushima Central Television Co., Ltd.

History
- First air date: April 1, 1970
- Former call signs: JOVI-TV (1970–2012)
- Former channel numbers: Analog: 33 (UHF; 1970–2012)
- Former affiliations: All secondary: FNN/FNS (April 1, 1970 – September 30, 1971); ANN (April 1, 1970 – September 30, 1981)

Technical information
- Licensing authority: MIC

Links
- Website: www.fct.co.jp

Corporate information
- Company
- Native name: 株式会社福島中央テレビ
- Romanized name: Kabushikigaisha Fukushimachūōterebi
- Type: Kabushiki gaisha
- Industry: Media
- Founded: May 20, 1969; 57 years ago
- Headquarters: 13-23 Ikenodai, Koriyama City, Fukushima Prefecture, Japan
- Key people: Hiroyasu Goami (President and Representative Director)
- Services: Television broadcasting
- Footnotes; Data from its Company Profile

Fukushima Central Television Co., Ltd (株式会社福島中央テレビ, Kabushiki-gaisha Fukushima Chūō Terebi), also known as Chūtele (中テレ) or FCT, is a Japanese broadcast network affiliated with the Nippon News Network and the Nippon Television Network System. Their headquarters are located in Fukushima Prefecture.

== History ==
The birth of the second commercial broadcaster in Fukushima Prefecture dates back to the dispute between the two major newspapers in the prefecture and the start of Fukushima Television, the first commercial station in the prefecture. At that time there were two local newspapers in the area: Fukushima Minpo (part of Mainichi Shimbun) and Fukushima Minyu (part of Yomiuri Shimbun). When Radio Fukushima started broadcasting in 1953, Fukushima Minpo took the lead, which resulted the rival newspaper to enter the competition.

In the late 1960s, the Ministry of Posts opened up applications for the use of UHF TV frequencies. Kōriyama City, the second largest city, campaigned for the establishment of the second broadcaster in the Prefecture.At that time, there were 11 companies applied for the license. Most of the companies then merged into Fukushima Central Television, and on March 31, 1969, they obtained the broadcast license.The broadcaster is located in Koriyama City, which was the first broadcaster to be headquartered outside the prefecture designated city.

Test broadcasts began on December 23, 1969, which was followed by a pilot broadcast on February 1 of the following year. Fukushima Central TV started broadcasting on April 1, 1970.From its opening, it was affiliated with Fuji TV and TV Asahi.However, more than a year from its first broadcast, Fuji TV and Nippon TV reach an agreement to let FCT air the latter network's programming, which resulted to Fukushima TV airing Fuji TV programs alongside TBS TV programming.

In 1971, FCT aired 100% of its programming in color, becoming the last station in Japan to start airing in color. FCT introduced OB vans that can broadcast in color.In 1976, FCT became number 1 in all-day and primetime TV ratings. In 1976, FCT published the Fukushima Bunko books, with a total of 50 volumes.This was later turned into a drama in 1980 under the title, "Hometown", with a total of 52 episodes.

With the launch of Fukushima Broadcasting on October 1, 1981, FCT dropped its All-Nippon News Network affiliation on that day.Due to the launch of KFB, FCT had a decrease in turnover after competition from other broadcasters intensified.
