= Koriyama Women's University =

Coordinates: 37°23′50.1″N 140°21′5.8″E

- 郡山女子大学
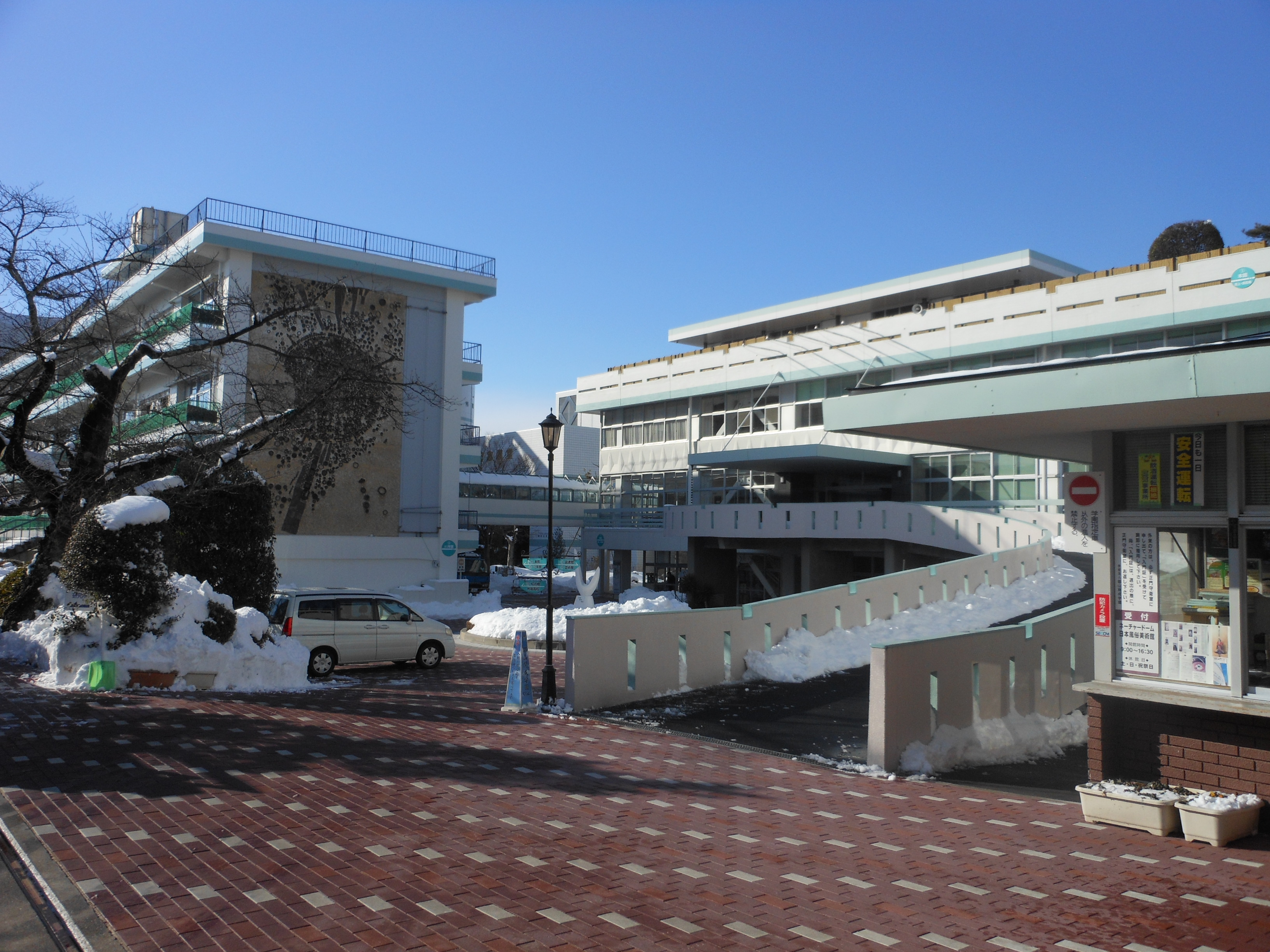
- Gate of the Koriyama Women's University
- Type: Private
- Established: 1966
- Location: Kōriyama, Fukushima, Japan
- Website: www.koriyama-kgc.ac.jp

Koriyama Women's University (郡山女子大学, Kōriyama joshi daigaku) is a private college, located in the city of Kōriyama, Japan.

== History ==
The Koriyama Women's University was established in 1966 as a women's college specializing in home economics. A graduate school was opened in 1992. The Koriyama Women's Junior College exists on the same site.

== Organization ==
=== Undergraduate ===
- School of Home Economics
  - Department of Food & Nutrition
  - Department of Human Life
- School of English language

=== Graduate ===
- Graduate School of Human Life
