= Fukushima Television =

JOPX-DTV
- Logo used since 2019

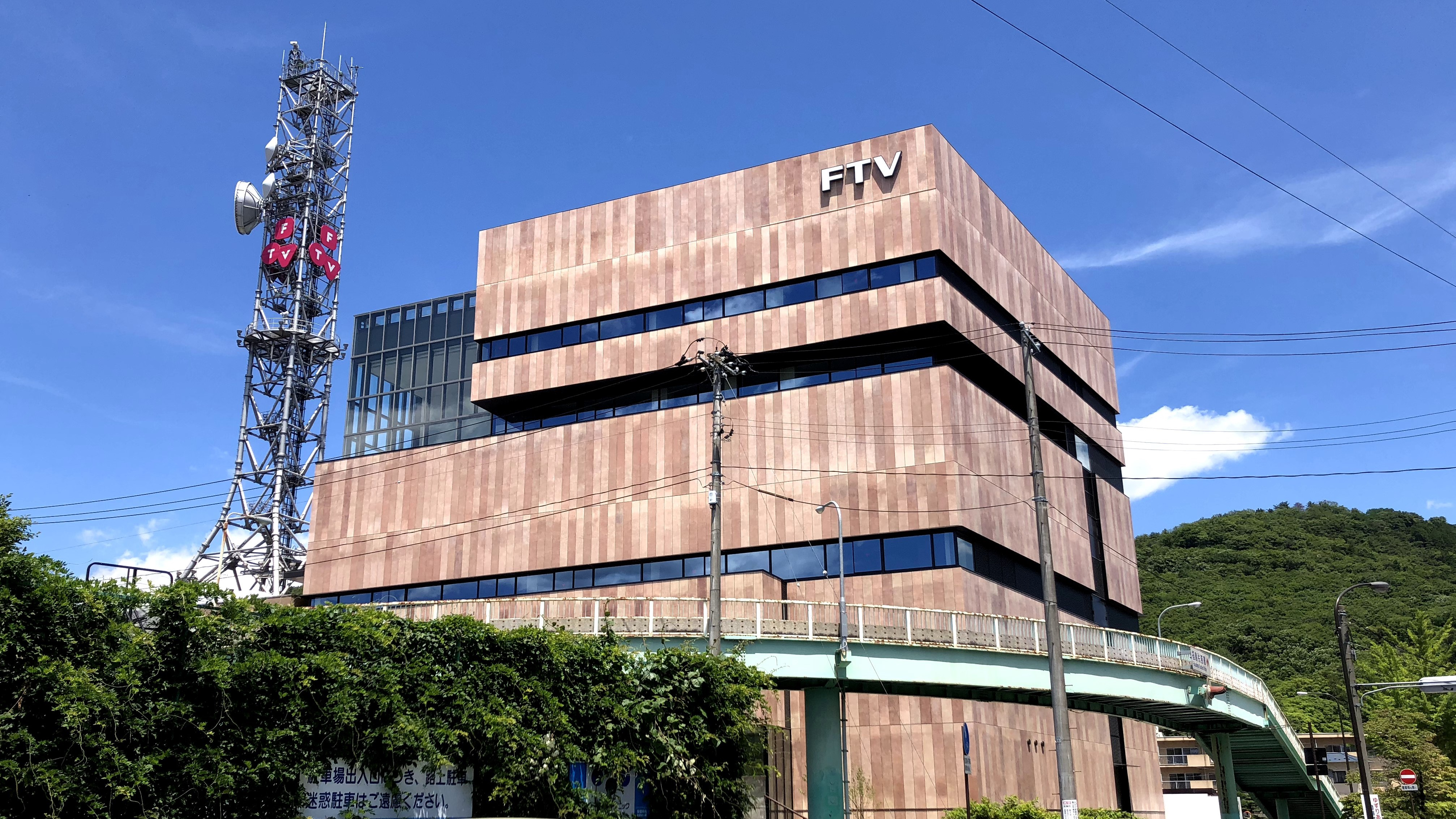
- Headquarters in Oyamacho, Fukushima
- Fukushima Prefecture; Japan
- City: Fukushima
- Channels: Digital: 25 (UHF); Virtual: 8
- Branding: FTV; Fukushima Television

Programming
- Language: Japanese
- Affiliations: Fuji News Network and Fuji Network System

Ownership
- Owner: Fukushima Television Broadcasting Co., Ltd.

History
- First air date: April 1, 1963
- Former call signs: JOPX-TV (1963-2012)
- Former channel numbers: Analog: 11 (VHF; 1963-2012)
- Former affiliations: All secondary: NTV/NNN (1963-1971); NET/ANN (1963-1982); TBS/JNN (1963-1983)

Technical information
- Licensing authority: MIC

Links
- Website: www.fukushima-tv.co.jp

Fukushima Television Broadcasting Co., Ltd. (Japanese: 福島テレビ, Hepburn: Fukushima Terebi; FTV), is a television network headquartered in Fukushima Prefecture, Japan.

Fukushima Television is the first commercial television broadcaster in Fukushima Prefecture, it was founded in 1962, and started broadcasting in 1963. In 2023, Fukushima Television celebrated its 60th anniversary.

On June 1, 2006, FTV started broadcasting digital terrestrial television. Due to the 2011 Tōhoku earthquake and tsunami, FTV postponed its schedule to end analogue television broadcasting on March 31, 2012.

FTV is affiliated with FNN and FNS. The government of Fukushima prefecture hold half of the station's shares. In 2020, FTV moved into its new headquarters.

== History ==
In the mid-1950s, there was an upsurge in applying to establish private television stations across Japan. Three companies in Fukushima Prefecture also applied to obtain television broadcasting licenses. At that time, the Postal Ministry would often persuade operators to consolidate their applications into one company after they submitted their applications. However, the three operators in Fukushima Prefecture refused to give in to each other, so that the only television license in Japan at that time became invalid. In 1960, when various operators in Fukushima Prefecture applied for television licenses again, the then governor of Fukushima Prefecture, Zenichiro Sato, stepped in to coordinate and once made the five applicants agree to integrate. However, in the end, the preliminary license was invalidated again due to personnel conflicts. The Fukushima Prefectural Government and the Assembly believed that the situation could no longer be solved independently by private forces, and proposed a plan for the prefectural government to become the main investor, which was agreed by private companies. In May 1962, Fukushima Television received a preliminary license and was officially established in June of the same year.

On April 1, 1963, Fukushima TV officially started broadcasting, covering 70% of Fukushima Prefecture. In the early days of broadcasting, Fukushima TV did not join a specific network, so it was able to broadcast popular programs from the four flagship stations (Nippon Television, TBS, Fuji Television and NET TV). "Weekly Bunshun" once called Fukushima TV' program schedule as "Japan's most luxurious program schedule". In April 1964, 24.1% of Fukushima TV's full-day programs were TBS programs, 31.2% were Nippon TV programs, 12.3% were Fuji TV programs, 9.4% were NET TV programs, 13.8% were self-produced programs, and 9.2% were from other TV stations. Among prime time programs, 51.2% were TBS programs, 34% were Nippon TV programs, 5% were Fuji TV programs, 4.7% were NET TV programs, 0.9% were self-produced programs, and 4.3% were other TV station programs. At the beginning of the broadcast, Fukushima TV broadcast an average of 10 hours and 10 minutes of programs every day. Three months after launch, this average has increased to 13 hours and 46 minutes, an increase in over three-and-a-half hours. In order to adapt to the rapid expansion of scale, in September 1965, the Fukushima TV headquarters was expanded and a new third floor was built.In 1966, Fukushima TV began broadcasting color programs. In order to cope with the demand for color equipment, Fukushima TV began construction of the second-generation headquarters on April 1, 1970, and it was completed on February 12 of the following year. This building is called FTV Broadcasting Hall, with a total floor area of 5,026 square meters, one underground floor and five above ground floors, with a color studio. With the completion of the new headquarters, Fukushima TV implemented colorization of its own programs in 1971. In January 1971, 80.5% of the programs broadcast by Fukushima TV were in color, and 99.5% of the prime time programs were in color.

After the launch of Fukushima Central Television in 1970, Fukushima Television began to mainly broadcast programs from TBS and Nippon Television. At the same time as the launch of Fukushima Central Television, Fukushima Television realized full-day broadcast. However, due to the rapid exchange of equity between Nippon Television and Fuji Television after Fukushima Central Television started broadcasting, in October 1971, Fukushima Television became an affiliate of TBS and Fuji Television networks, and Nippon Television withdrew from the operation of Fukushima Television. In 1972, Fukushima TV's turnover reached 2.478 billion yen, and its after-tax profits reached 189 million yen.

In 1982, the Ministry of Posts and Telecommunications revised the frequency plan, which meant that Fukushima Prefecture was about to open a fourth private TV station. Since Fukushima Broadcasting, the third private TV station in Fukushima Prefecture, has joined the All-Nippon News Network, the fourth private TV station must be a member of Japan News Network. In November 1982, TBS told Fukushima TV that after the launch of the fourth private TV station in Fukushima Prefecture (which was expected to be launched in October 1983), programs produced by TBS would no longer be broadcast on Fukushima TV. At the end of March 1983, Fukushima TV withdrew from JNN and gradually stopped broadcasting TBS programs, becoming a full member of the FNN/FNS network.

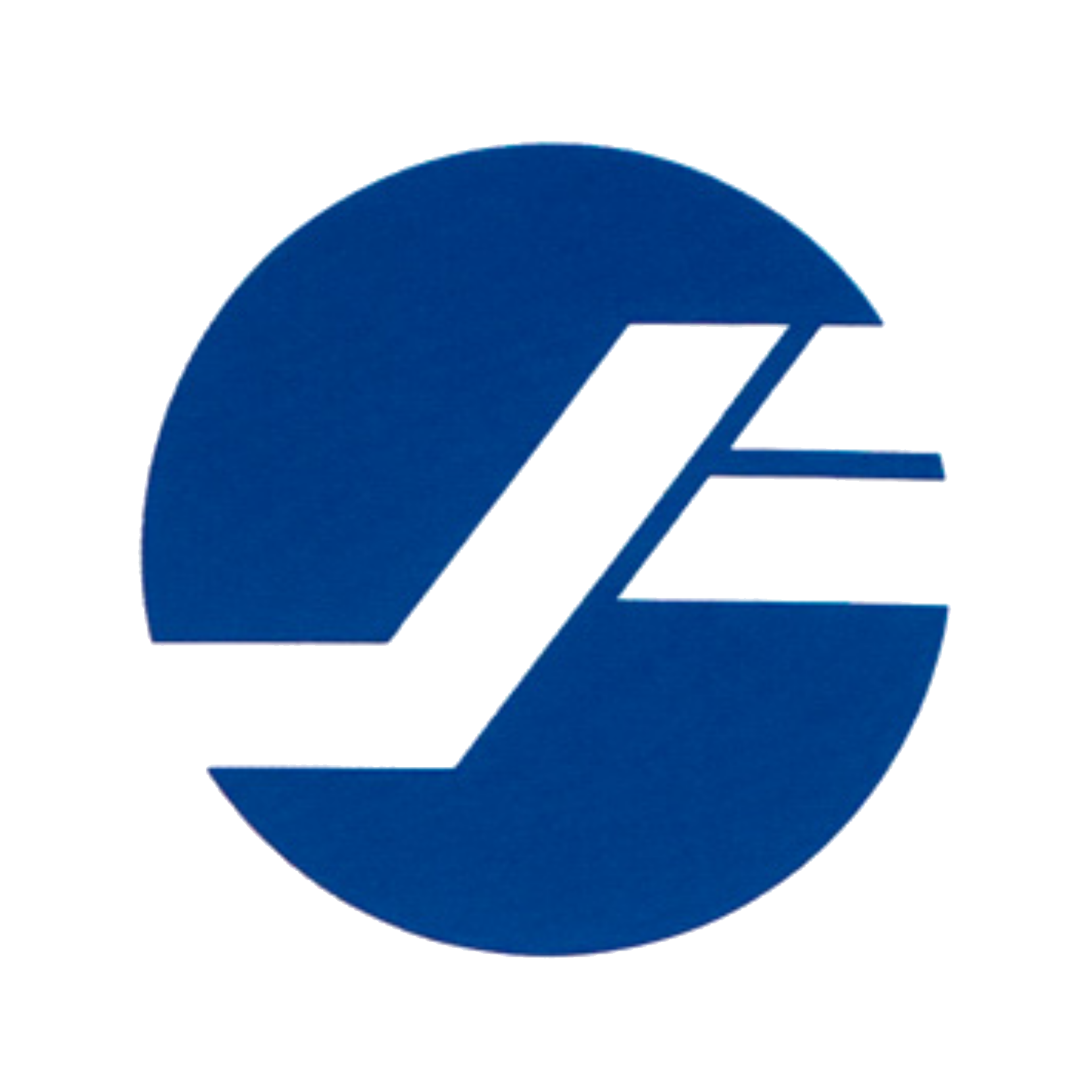
The symbol mark used from 1983 to 1998

First logo mark(1963 - 1998)

Fukushima TV began broadcasting in stereo in 1981. From 1983 to 1986, due to the intensified competition caused by the launch of new stations, Fukushima TV once fell into a sluggish performance. But after 1987, Fukushima TV's performance began to recover. In the mid-to-late 1980s, Fukushima TV also began to operate residential exhibition halls to develop income other than television. In 1985, Fukushima TV began to implement a two-day weekend system. Relying on the high ratings of the flagship station Fuji TV in the 1980s, Fukushima TV also won the triple crown of ratings for the first time in 1988. In 1992, for its 30th anniversary, Fukushima TV produced the commemorative TV series "Autumn Station" (秋の駅), set at the Aizu Yanagizu Station on the JR Tadami Line. It received a high ratings of 25.6% in Fukushima Prefecture and became popular in Japan. It was broadcast on the national FNN network.

Symbol established in 1998

In 2016, Fukushima TV spent 3.5 billion yen to build a new headquarters. The building is an earthquake-proof structure with 6 floors above ground and a total floor area of 6,218 square meters. The lobby on the first floor is a square open to the public. On April 1, 2019, Fukushima TV began broadcasting programs from its new headquarters.
