= Kōriyama Castle (Kōriyama) =

Former castle in Kōriyama, Fukushima Prefecture, Japan

- 郡山城
- Kōriyama, Fukushima Prefecture, Japan
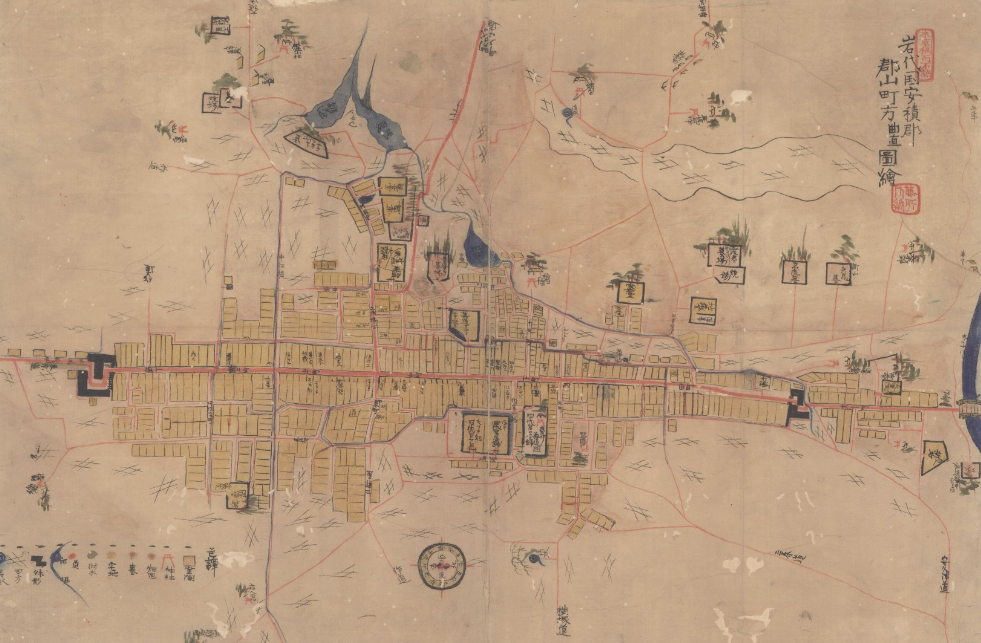
- Map from the early Meiji period showing the ruins of Inari Castle (Kōriyama Castle).

Site information
- Type: Japanese castle
- Controlled by: Kōriyama clan (Itō clan)
- Open to the public: no

Location
- Coordinates: 37.3970409°N 140.3857913°E

Site history
- In use: Sengoku period

Kōriyama Castle (郡山城, Kōriyama-jō), also known as Inari Castle (稲荷舘, Inari-tate; lit. "Inari palace"), was a castle in Kōriyama, Fukushima Prefecture, Japan. It was the seat of the Kōriyama clan (part of the Itō clan, which was a branch of the Date clan).

== History ==
Built in Mutsu Province, the exact date Kōriyama Castle was completed is unclear. It was the seat of the Kōriyama clan (part of the Itō clan, which was a branch of the Date clan). The castle is mentioned in accounts of the Kōriyama Campaign, which took place between February and July in 1588.

== Site ==
The location of the castle was disputed for many years, with theories placing the castle near present-day Kōriyama Station or on the western plateau of the northwest bank of the former Yaoto River at a location called Nishi-no-Uchi (西の内). The Nishi-no-Uchi location had less support due its distance from the center of town and the fact that it couldn't "overlook the town" from its location. A study conducted between April and May 2022 confirmed the site near Kōriyama Station after finding parts of the ruins while excavating prior to building new community facilities.

== Works cited ==
- 柳田和久 (Kazuhisa Yanagita) (2001). 郡山合戦と郡山城について・上 [About the Battle of Kōriyama and Kōriyama Castle, Part 1]. Fukushima Historical Studies (in Japanese). 福島史学研究.
- 柳田和久 (Kazuhisa Yanagita) (2001). 郡山合戦と郡山城について・下 [About the Battle of Kōriyama and Kōriyama Castle, Part 2] (in Japanese). 福島史学研究.
- 郡山市史 [History of the City of Kōriyama] (in Japanese). Vol. 1. City of Kōriyama. February 1975.
- 医療施設並びに共同施設等建築に伴う埋蔵文化財発掘調査業務 稲荷館跡（郡山城） [Excavation and Survey of Buried Cultural Properties Associated with the Construction of Medical and Community Facilities: Inari Castle Ruins (Kōriyama Castle)] (PDF) (Report) (in Japanese). Kōriyama: 郡山市教育委員会 (Kōriyama City Board of Education). October 2022. Archived (PDF) from the original on 12 July 2025.
