= Kōriyama explosion =

Gas explosion in Kōriyama, Japan

- Date: 30 July 2020
- Location: Kōriyama, Fukushima Prefecture, Japan; 37°23′53″N 140°20′50″E
- Cause: Gas leak
- Deaths: 1
- Injuries: 19

The Kōriyama explosion occurred on 30 July 2020 at 8:57 a.m. Japan Standard Time, when a gas explosion destroyed an On-Yasai, a shabu-shabu restaurant located along Sakura-dōri in the city of Kōriyama in Fukushima Prefecture, Japan. The blast resulted in the death of a person and the wounding of 19 other people. The restaurant was being remodeled at the time of its destruction. The man who was killed in the blast was part of the crew who was renovating the restaurant, though he was the only worker present at the time of the incident. An Ikinari Steak restaurant and a bank within the vicinity of the restaurant were also damaged. Four of the bank's occupants were among the injured. Damage caused by the blast was reported up to 450 meters (1,480 ft) away from its epicenter at the shabu-shabu restaurant.

== Investigation ==
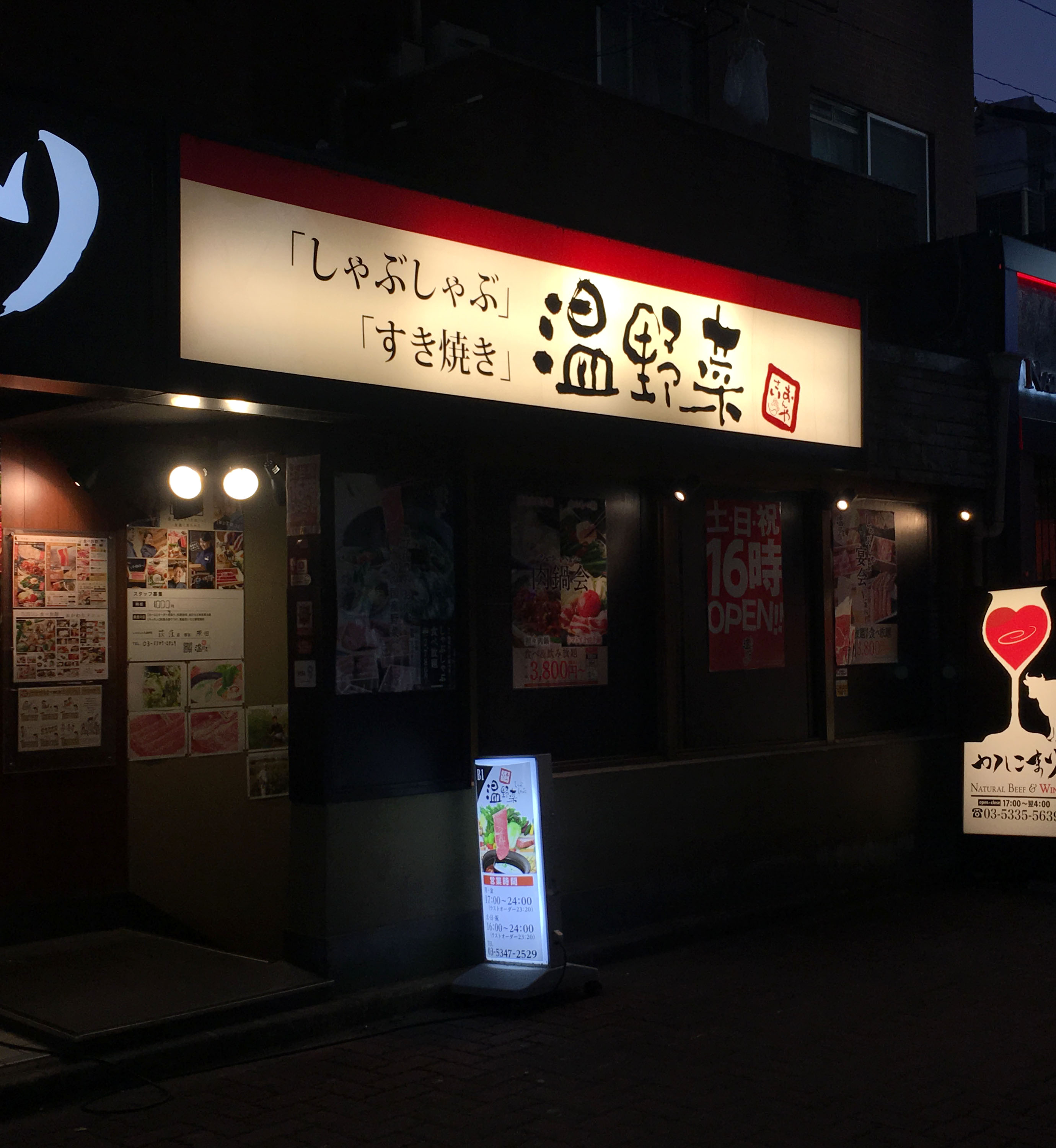
An On-Yasai restaurant similar to the one destroyed in Kōriyama

The cause of the gas explosion is currently being investigated by authorities, though it is suspected to have been caused by the failure of several propane cylinders. The company carrying out the renovation work at the time of the explosion claimed their work did not involve the gas cylinders. However, the renovation did include the rushed installation of an induction stove near the restaurant's gas stove on the day prior to the blast. Fukushima Prefectural Police suspect that gas was leaking from the cylinders throughout the night prior to the blast, filling the building with their contents. This theory is backed up by reports from nearby residents who said they had smelled gas in the area the day before the explosion. When the renovation worker entered the premises and turned on the power to the building, the gas was ignited. The restaurant's gas supplier informed the police on 5 August that they had noticed corrosion on the restaurant's gas pipes in June. The restaurant's owners claimed they had not acted on the information from the gas supplier because the store was closed to business.
