= Ohu University =

Coordinates: 37°25′6.8″N 140°22′27.5″E

- 奥羽大学
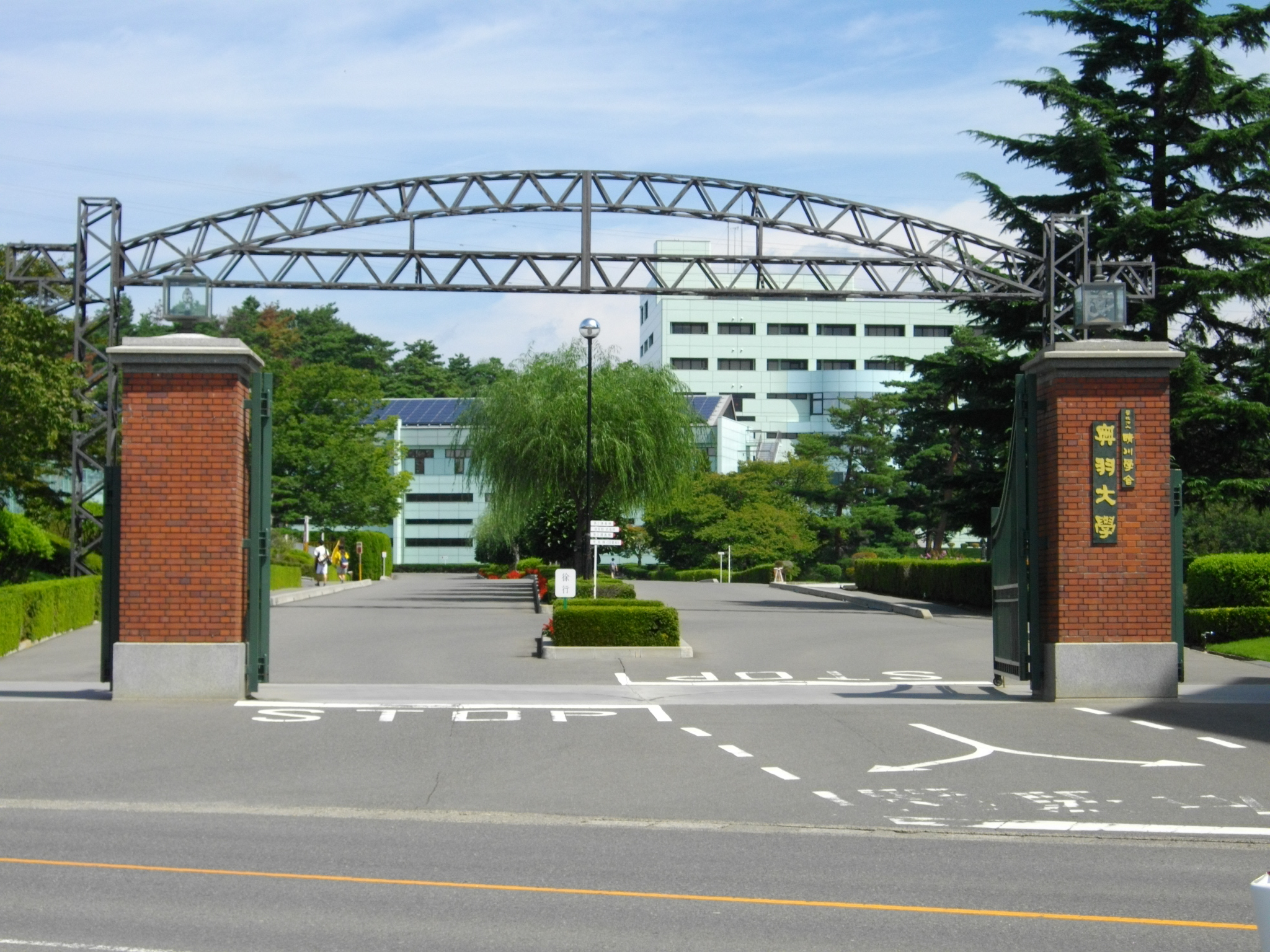
- Taken from Fukushima Prefectural Rd. 296. A main entrance for pedestrians and car users.
- Type: Private
- Established: 1966
- Location: Kōriyama, Fukushima, Japan
- Website: http://www.ohu-u.ac.jp/index.html

Ohu University (奥羽大学, Ōu Daigaku) is a private university, located in the city of Kōriyama, Japan.

== History ==
Ohu University was established in 1972 as the Tohoku Dental University. It changed its name in 1989 to the Ohu University. A school of pharmacy was established in 2005.
