= Kōriyama =

Kōriyama 郡山市
- Core city
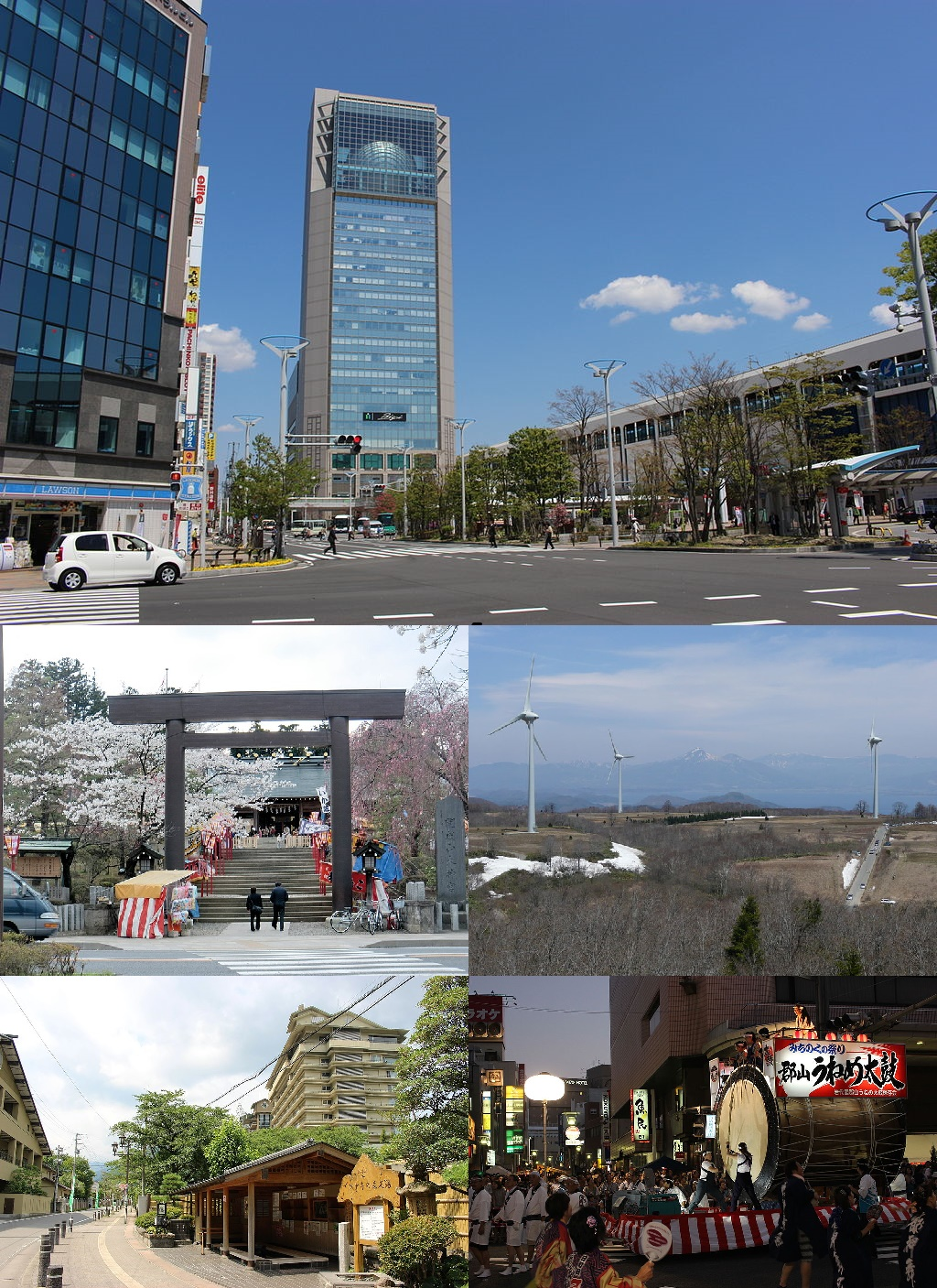
- Top: View of Kōriyama Big-i complex building and Kōriyama railway station, Middle: Kōriyama Kaisei Shrine, Nunobiki Highland, near Lake Inawashiro, Bottom: Bandai-Atami Spa, Kōriyama Uneme Festival in August (all item from left to right)

- Flag Seal

- Location of Kōriyama in Fukushima Prefecture

- Coordinates: 37°24′1.6″N 140°21′35″E
- Country: Japan
- Region: Tōhoku
- Prefecture: Fukushima
- First official recorded: 135 AD
- Town settled: April 1, 1889
- City settled: September 1, 1924

Government
  - Mayor: Takeo Shiine

Area
  - Total: 757.20 km^{2} (292.36 sq mi)

Population (August 1, 2023)
  - Total: 321,938
  - Density: 425.17/km^{2} (1,101.2/sq mi)
- Time zone: UTC+9 (Japan Standard Time)
- Tree: Prunus serrulata (Japanese hill cherry)
- Flower: Japanese iris
- Bird: Common cuckoo
- Phone number: 024-924-2491
- Address: 1-23-7 Asahi, Koriyama, Fukushima 963-8024
- Website: Official website

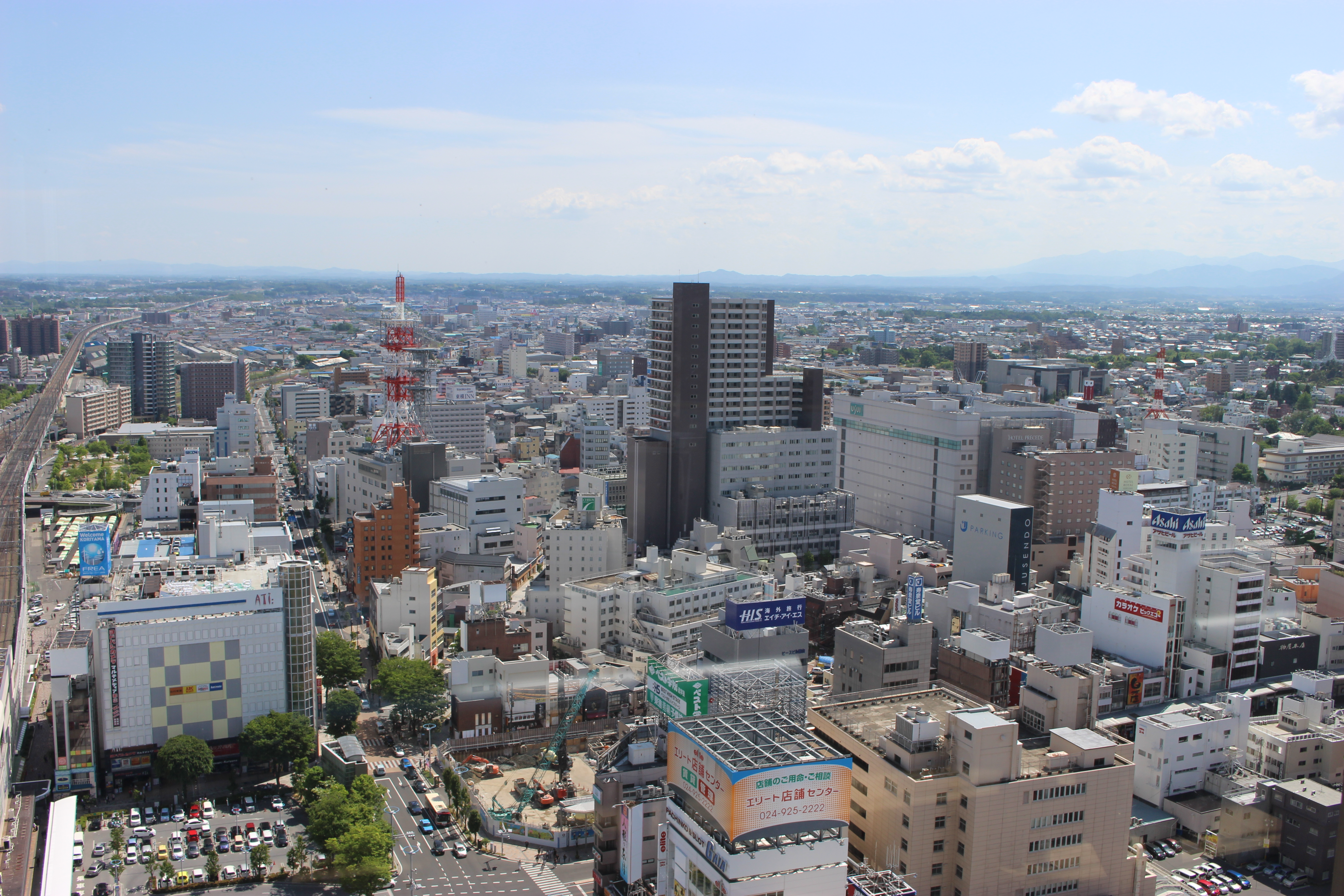
View of central Kōriyama

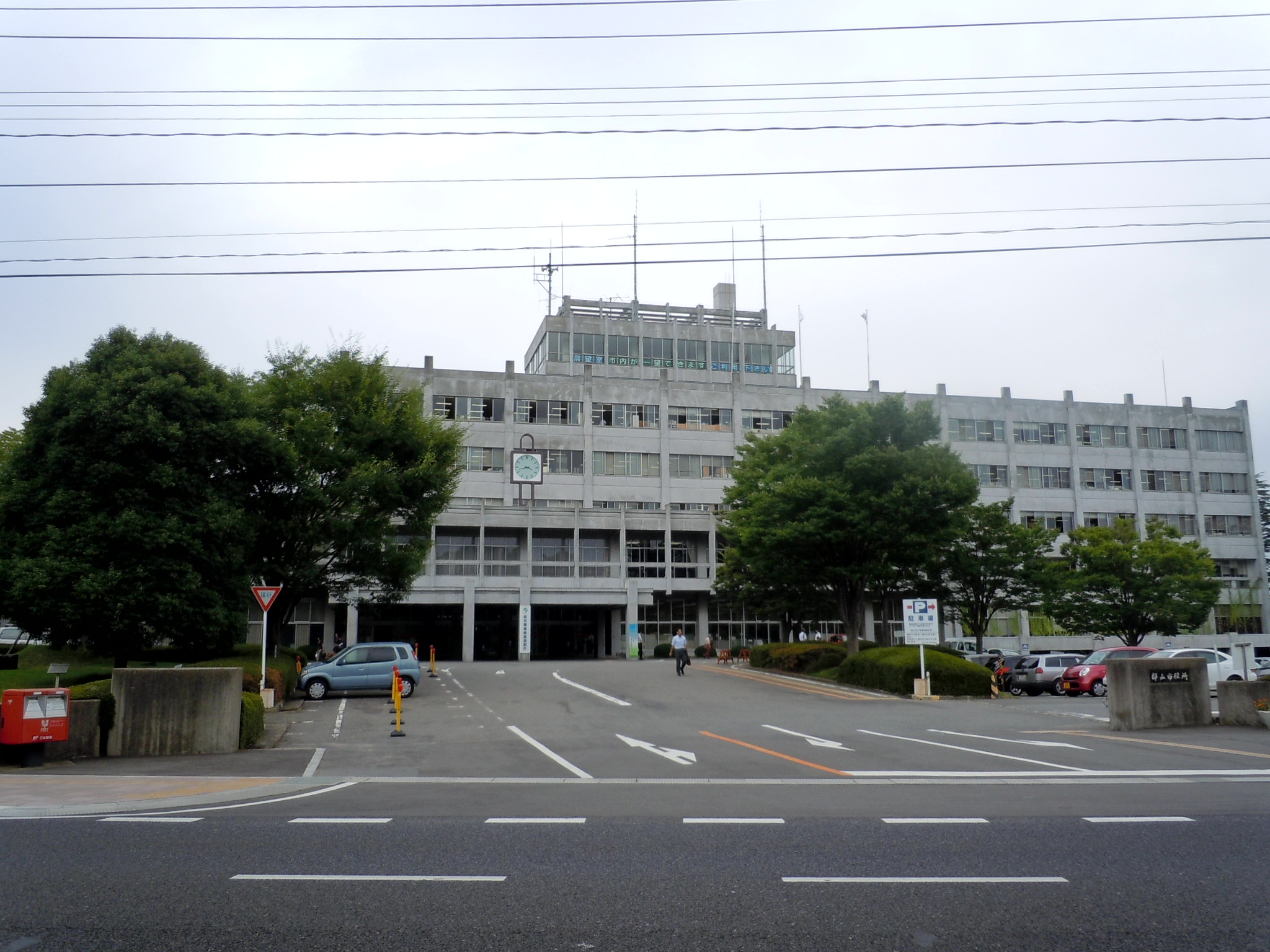
Kōriyama city hall

Kōriyama (郡山市, Kōriyama-shi) is a city in Fukushima Prefecture, Japan. As of 1 August 2023, the city had an estimated population of 321,938 people in 141,760 households, and a population density of 425 persons per km^{2}. The total area of the city is 757.20 square kilometers (292.36 sq mi). Kōriyama is designated as a core city and functions as a commercial center for Fukushima Prefecture. Kōriyama is the third largest conurbation in the Tōhoku region.

== History ==
Kōriyama originated as a regional governmental center in the Nara period, when the area was on the frontier of Yamato settlement of the Tōhoku region. The surrounding area developed into shōen controlled by various samurai clans in the Heian and Kamakura periods. Nearby centers, such as Nihonmatsu developed into castle towns under Hatakeyama clan and which were later controlled by the Date clan, Kōriyama remained as a commercial center and thrived as a post town because of its importance as a traffic focal point into the Edo period and was part of the territory of Nihonmatsu Domain.

With the establishment of the modern municipalities system on April 1, 1889, the town of Kōriyama was established within Asaka District. In the early Meiji period, many dispossessed samurai were assigned undeveloped lands in the area to reclaim and as a result, the population grew and region developed into an agricultural center. The relative abundance of hydroelectric power also helped with the development of local industry.

Kōriyama was raised from town to city status on September 1, 1924 with the annexation of neighboring Odawara Village. Kuwano Village was likewise annexed on June 1, 1925. During the 1930s, Kōriyama was a noted center for military equipment production. It was thus a target for American bombers during World War II, and the city was subject to three large-scale air raids during the war.

From 1954 to 1955, Kōriyama expanded by annexing the town of Otsuki and portions of the villages of Tomita and Iwae. In 1965, Kōriyama annexed the villages of Nishida and Nakata. In 1997, the city received core city designation, giving it increased autonomy from national and prefectural governments.

On March 11, 2011, the Great East Japan Earthquake caused damage, but Kōriyama is located outside of the mandatory evacuation zone set by the Japanese government after the Fukushima Daiichi nuclear disaster. Many people from the evacuation zone relocated to Kōriyama. On 30 July 2020, a shabu-shabu restaurant exploded, damaging an area spanning several hundred meters.

== Geography and climate ==
Kōriyama is located in the center of the Nakadōri region of Fukushima Prefecture in the Tōhoku region of Japan. The Adatara Mountains are to the north, Lake Inawashiro is to the west, and the Abukuma Highlands are to the east. The Abukuma River flows through downtown Kōriyama. The downtown area extends to the west of Kōriyama Station.

=== Neighboring municipalities ===
- Aizuwakamatsu
- Hirata
- Inawashiro
- Miharu
- Motomiya
- Nihonmatsu
- Ono
- Otama
- Sukagawa
- Tamura
- Ten-ei

=== Climate ===
Kōriyama has a humid subtropical climate (Köppen Cfa) characterized by hot wet summers and cool, quite dry winters. The average annual temperature in Kōriyama is 11.9 °C (53.4 °F). The average annual rainfall is 1,216 millimeters (47.9 in) with September as the wettest month. The temperatures are highest on average in August, at around 25.0 °C (77.0 °F), and lowest in January, at around 0.1 °C (32.2 °F).

Climate data for Kōriyama (1991–2020 normals, extremes 1976–present)
Month	Jan	Feb	Mar	Apr	May	Jun	Jul	Aug	Sep	Oct	Nov	Dec	Year
Record high °C (°F)	14.5 (58.1)	18.6 (65.5)	23.1 (73.6)	29.5 (85.1)	34.2 (93.6)	34.8 (94.6)	37.3 (99.1)	36.6 (97.9)	34.8 (94.6)	30.1 (86.2)	25.3 (77.5)	19.6 (67.3)	37.3 (99.1)
Mean daily maximum °C (°F)	4.5 (40.1)	5.5 (41.9)	9.5 (49.1)	16.1 (61.0)	21.6 (70.9)	24.8 (76.6)	28.0 (82.4)	29.4 (84.9)	25.2 (77.4)	19.4 (66.9)	13.5 (56.3)	7.5 (45.5)	17.1 (62.8)
Daily mean °C (°F)	0.9 (33.6)	1.4 (34.5)	4.6 (40.3)	10.5 (50.9)	16.2 (61.2)	20.0 (68.0)	23.5 (74.3)	24.5 (76.1)	20.4 (68.7)	14.5 (58.1)	8.6 (47.5)	3.4 (38.1)	12.4 (54.3)
Mean daily minimum °C (°F)	−2.5 (27.5)	−2.3 (27.9)	0.1 (32.2)	5.0 (41.0)	11.1 (52.0)	15.9 (60.6)	19.9 (67.8)	20.7 (69.3)	16.5 (61.7)	10.1 (50.2)	3.8 (38.8)	−0.4 (31.3)	8.2 (46.8)
Record low °C (°F)	−12.0 (10.4)	−12.5 (9.5)	−12.8 (9.0)	−4.4 (24.1)	1.5 (34.7)	7.8 (46.0)	8.8 (47.8)	12.0 (53.6)	5.4 (41.7)	−1.0 (30.2)	−5.8 (21.6)	−11.1 (12.0)	−12.8 (9.0)
Average precipitation mm (inches)	40.9 (1.61)	27.6 (1.09)	66.1 (2.60)	75.4 (2.97)	92.2 (3.63)	120.6 (4.75)	191.2 (7.53)	144.4 (5.69)	162.7 (6.41)	126.5 (4.98)	57.8 (2.28)	38.1 (1.50)	1,143.3 (45.01)
Average precipitation days (≥ 1.0 mm)	7.3	5.7	9.1	9.0	9.7	11.4	14.0	11.3	11.3	8.9	6.9	7.3	111.8
Mean monthly sunshine hours	128.8	140.0	170.9	181.6	195.7	148.9	138.2	164.3	125.9	133.0	129.2	124.6	1,781.1
Source: Japan Meteorological Agency (1991–2020 normals, extremes 1976–present)

== Demographics ==
Per Japanese census data, the population of Kōriyama has increased over the past 60 years.

Historical population
Year	Pop.	±%
1960	213,771	—
1970	241,726	+13.1%
1980	286,451	+18.5%
1990	314,642	+9.8%
2000	334,824	+6.4%
2010	338,712	+1.2%
2020	327,692	−3.3%

== Government ==
Kōriyama has a mayor-council form of government with a directly elected mayor and a unicameral city legislature of 38 members. The city contributes nine members to the Fukushima Prefectural Assembly. In terms of national politics, Kōriyama is part of the Fukushima 2nd Electoral District, which includes neighbouring Nihonmatsu, Motomiya and Adachi District.

=== Mayors ===
- 1st: Yoshiya Ōmori (大森吉弥、1925–1929)
- 2nd: Jun Wada (和田 潤, 1929–1937)
- 3rd: Hachirō Murai (村井 八郎, 1937–1940)
- 4th: Ujirō Seki (関 卯次郎, 1940–1942)
- 5th: Hachikurō Ōshima (大島 破竹郎, 1942–1947)
- 6th: Shichiji Itō (伊藤 七司, 6 April - 2 May 1947)
- 7th: Zenko Honma (本間 善庫, 1947–1951)
- 8th: Morishige Tanji (丹治 盛重, 1951–1959)
- 9th: Hiyoshi Hidese (秀瀬 日吉, 1959–1977)
- 10th: Takashi Takahashi (高橋 堯, 1977–1985)
- 11th: Hisashi Aoki (青木 久, 1985–1993)
- 12th: Eiji Fujimori (藤森 英二, 1993–2005)
- 13th: Masao Hara (原 正夫, 2005–2013)
- 14th: Masato Shinagawa (品川萬里, 2013-2025)
- 15th: Takeo Shiine (椎根健雄, 2025-)

== Economy ==
Kōriyama city is called the "commercial capital in Fukushima" and the economic bloc is the biggest in Fukushima Prefecture.

Principal companies headquartered in Koriyama

- XEBIO; sporting goods
- Kourakuen; ramen noodle shop chain
- York Benimaru; large supermarket retailer with networks in south Tōhoku, Nigata, and North Kanto

Banks headquartered in Koriyama

- Daito Bank
- Toho Bank

== Transportation ==
Kōriyama is an important transportation hub, as it is located in the center of Fukushima Prefecture and is the nexus of several railway lines and expressways. Kōriyama Station is the central station for the city. However, Kōriyama does not have an airport.

=== Railway ===
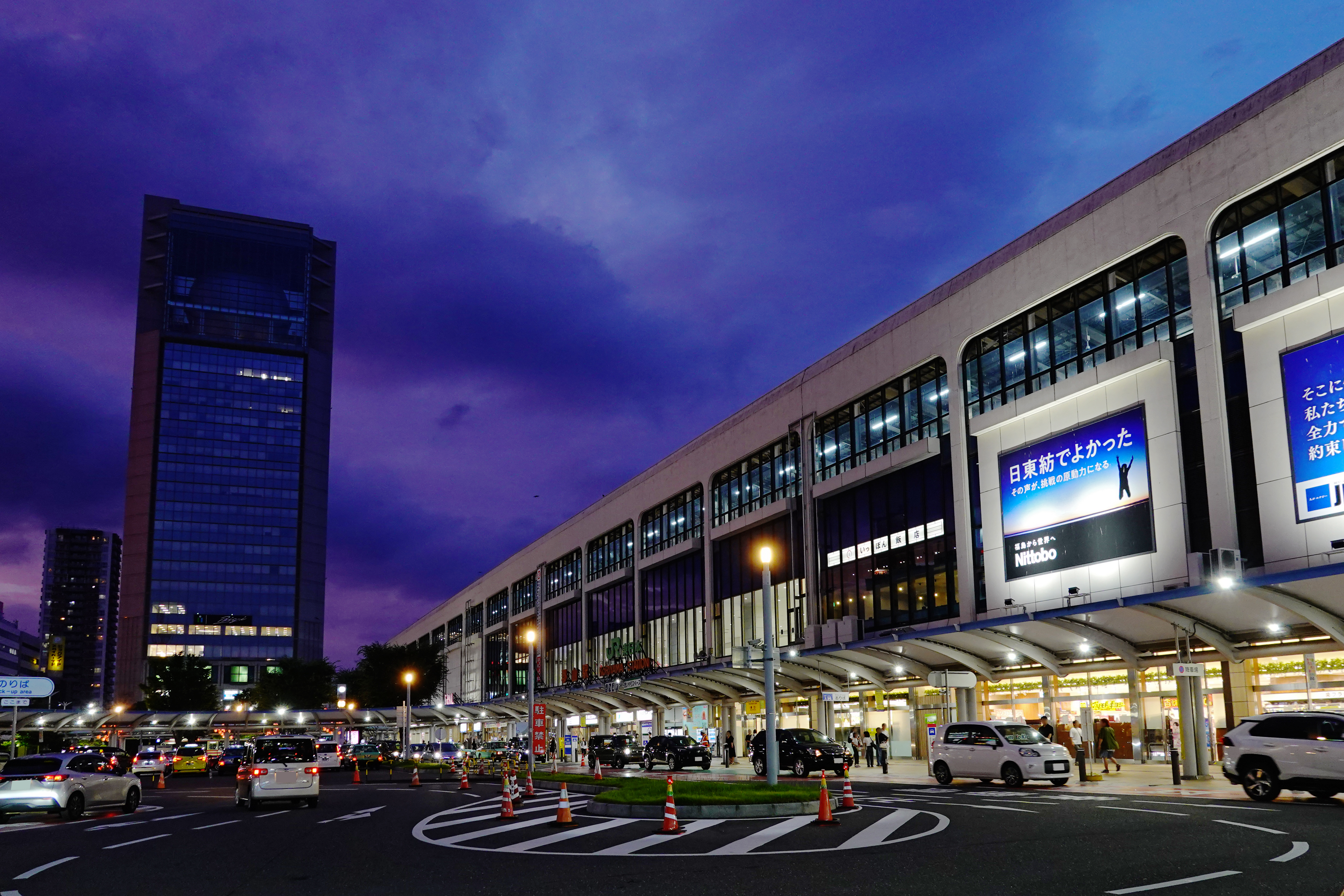
JR Koriyama Station

JR East - Tōhoku Shinkansen

- Kōriyama

JR East - Tōhoku Main Line

- Asaka-Nagamori - Kōriyama - Hiwada

JR East - East Ban'etsu Line

- Kōriyama - Mōgi

JR East - West Ban'etsu Line

- Kōriyama - Kōriyamatomita - Kikuta - Akogashima - Bandai-Atami - Nakayamajuku

JR East - Suigun Line

- Kōriyama - Asaka-Nagamori - Yatagawa - Iwaki-Moriyama

=== Highway ===
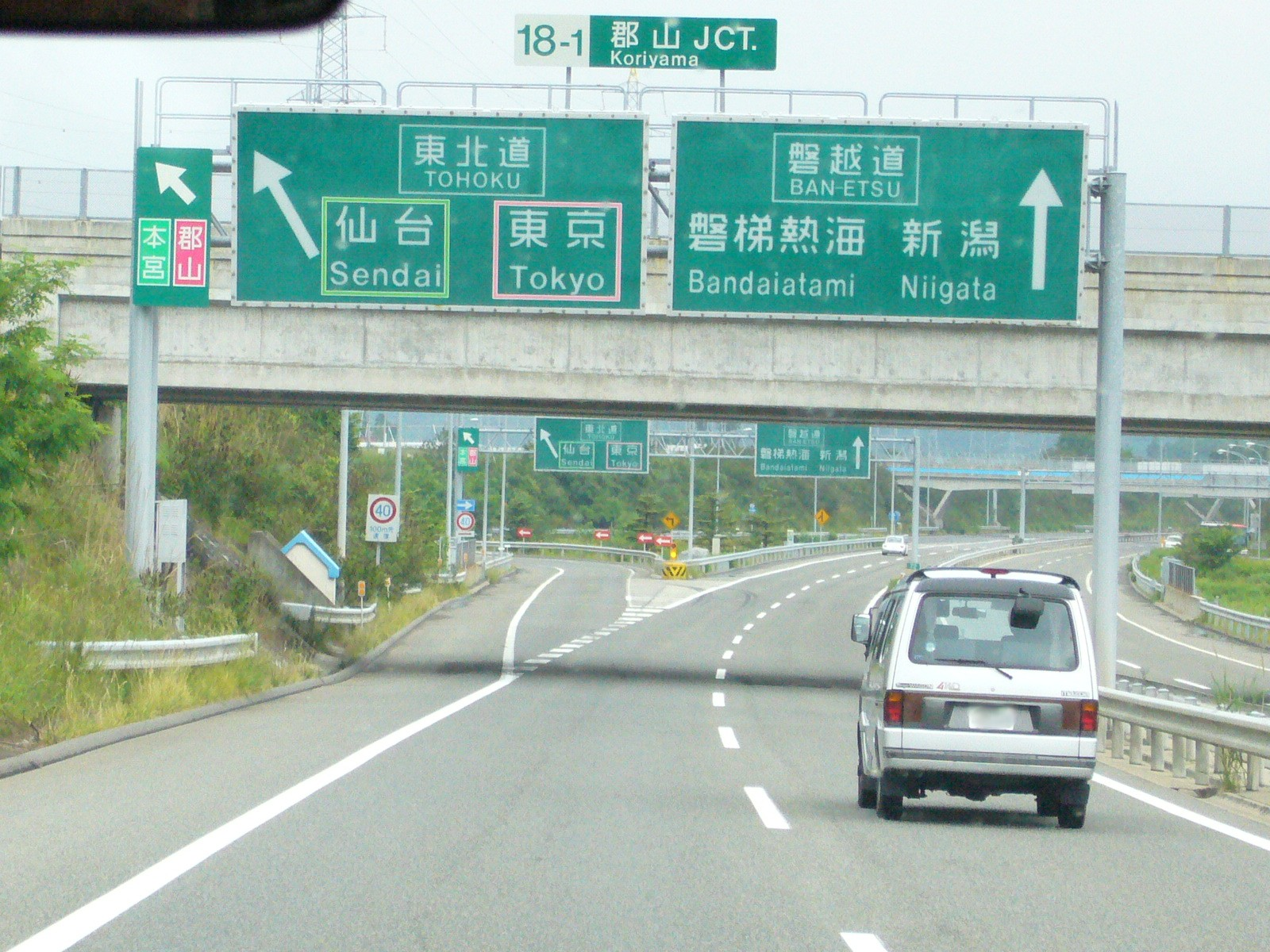
Koriyama Junction

- Tōhoku Expressway - Asaka PA - Kōriyama-minami IC - Kōriyama IC - Kōriyama JCT
- Ban-etsu Expressway - Kōriyama-higashi IC - Kōriyama JCT - Gohyakugawa PA - Bandai-Atami IC
- National Route 4
- National Route 49
- National Route 288
- National Route 294

== Media ==
=== Television ===
- Fukushima Central Television (Nippon Television chain)
- Fukushima Broadcasting (TV Asahi chain)

CATY

- Information Network Kōriyama

=== Radio ===
- FM Fukushima (JFN)

=== Newspaper ===
- Fukushima Mimpō (Fukushima, Mainichi chain)
- Fukushima Minyū (Fukushima, Yomiuri chain)
- Kahoku Shinpō (Sendai)

== Education ==
=== Universities and colleges ===
- Kōriyama Women's University Junior College
- Kōriyama Women's University & Colleges
- Nihon University, Faculty of Engineering
- Ohu University
- Open University of Japan, Fukushima Learning Center

=== Senior high schools ===
Kōriyama has ten public high schools operated by the Fukushima Prefectural Board of Education and six private high schools

Public (prefectural)

- Asaka High School
- Asaka Mitate Branch High School
- Asaka Reimei High School
- Kōriyama High School
- Kōriyama Higashi High School
- Kōriyama Shōgyō High School
- Kōriyama Kita Kōgyō High School
- Asaka Kaisei High School
- Konan High School
- Kōriyama Hōsei High School

Private

- Tohoku High School of Nihon University
- Shōshi Gakuen Shōshi High School
- Teikyō Asaka High School
- High School affiliated with Kōriyama Women's Colleges

=== Junior high schools ===
Public

- Koriyama First Junior High School
- Koriyama Second Junior High School
- Koriyama Third Junior High School
- Koriyama Fourth Junior High School
- Koriyama Fifth Junior High School
- Koriyama Sixth Junior High School
- Koriyama Seventh Junior High School
- Tomita Junior High School
- Asaka Junior High School
- Asaka Second Junior High School
- Ōtsuki Junior High School
- Mihota Junior High School
- Futase Junior High School
- Nishida Junior High School
- Katahira Junior High School
- Kikuta Junior High School
- Midorigaoka Junior High School
- Moriyama Junior High School
- Hiwada Junior High School
- Meiken Junior High School
- Koharada Junior High School
- Kohken Junior High School
- Miyagi Junior High School
- Ose Junior High School
- Konan Junior High School
- Mitate Junior High School
- Takase Junior High School
- Atami Junior High School

Private

- Xaverio Junior High School

=== Multi-level schools ===
- Fukushima Korean School (Japanese: 福島朝鮮初中級学校; Korean: 후쿠시마 조선 초중급학교) - North Korean international school

== Notable people from Koriyama ==
- GReeeeN, band
- Hidekaz Himaruya, creator Hetalia
- Takeshi Honda, Figure skater
- Toru Iwaya, Mezzotint engraver, painter
- Miki Nagasawa, voice actress
- Eimi Naruse (成瀬 瑛美), Japanese idol and voice actress
- Takumi Nemoto, Politician (Minister of Health, Labour and Welfare)
- Toshiyuki Nishida, actor
- Saga (Alice Nine), musician
- Masashi Ohuchi, Olympic weightlifter
- Toshio Tamogami, chief of staff of Japan Air Self-Defense Force
- Joji Yuasa, composer
- Yumena Yanai, actress and model

== Sister cities ==
=== Japanese sister cities ===
- (Japan) Nara, Nara, since 5 August 1971
- (Japan) Kurume, Fukuoka, since 3 August 1975
- (Japan) Tottori, Tottori, since 25 November 2005

=== International relations ===
- Brummen, Netherlands, since 25 June 1988

== Local attractions ==
=== Festivals ===
- Kōriyama Uneme Festival
- Koriyama Summer Festival - an Oktoberfest-style festival.
- Koriyama Autumn Festival - includes children's activities, taiko and mikoshi parades.

=== National Historic Sites ===
- Ōyasuba Kofun

=== Other sites ===
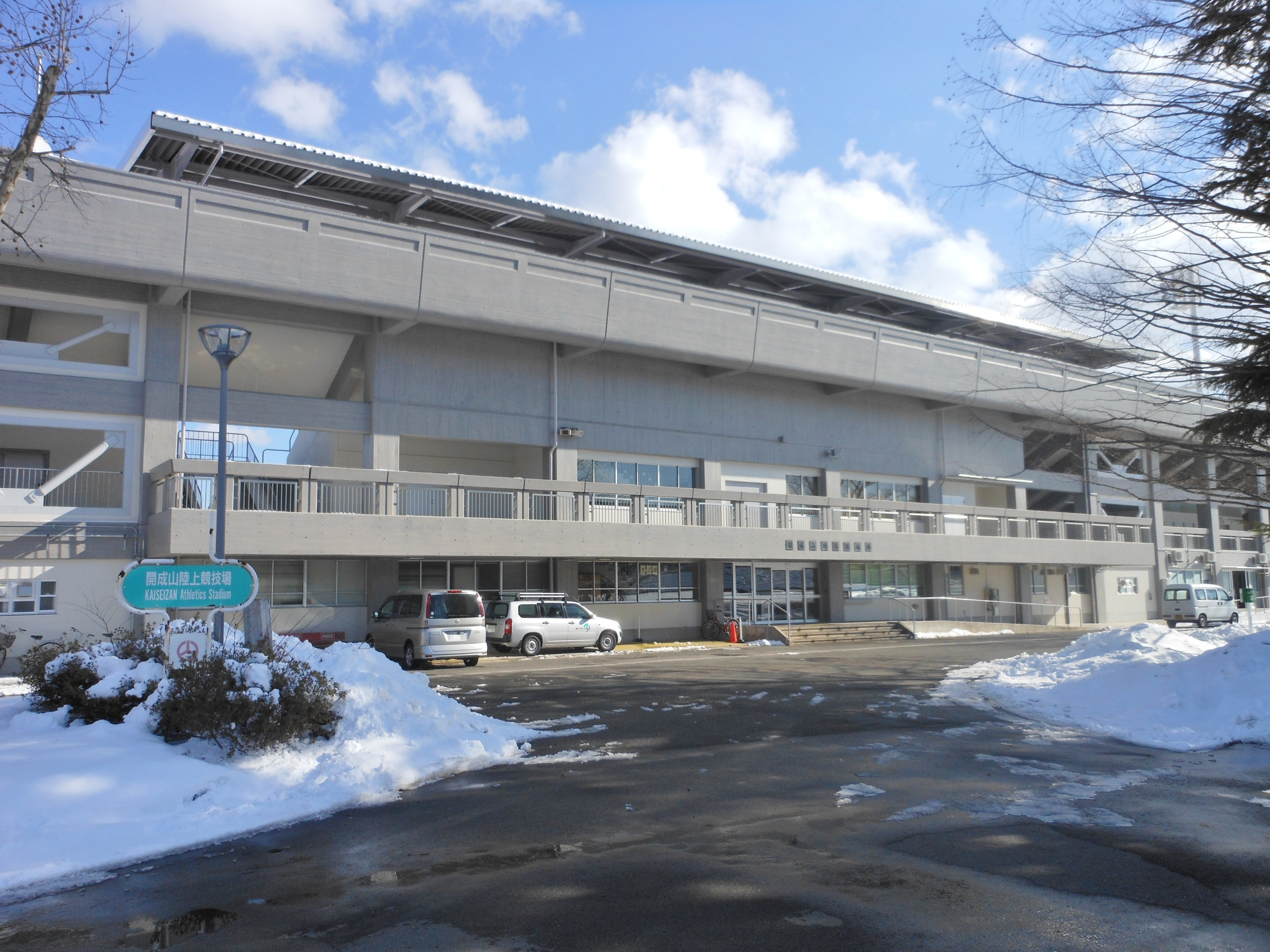
Kōriyama Hirose Kaiseizan Athletic Stadium

- Kōriyama Castle
- Kōriyama Hirose Kaiseizan Athletic Stadium

== Pop culture ==
Both Engaged to the Unidentified (未確認で進行形 - Mikakunin de Shinkoukei) and Kimi to Pico-Pico (きみとピコピコ) manga take place in the city. Fans have created maps in order to make related pilgrimages to their favorite locations.
