= MBS (TV channel) =

JOOY-DTV
- Logo used since 2011

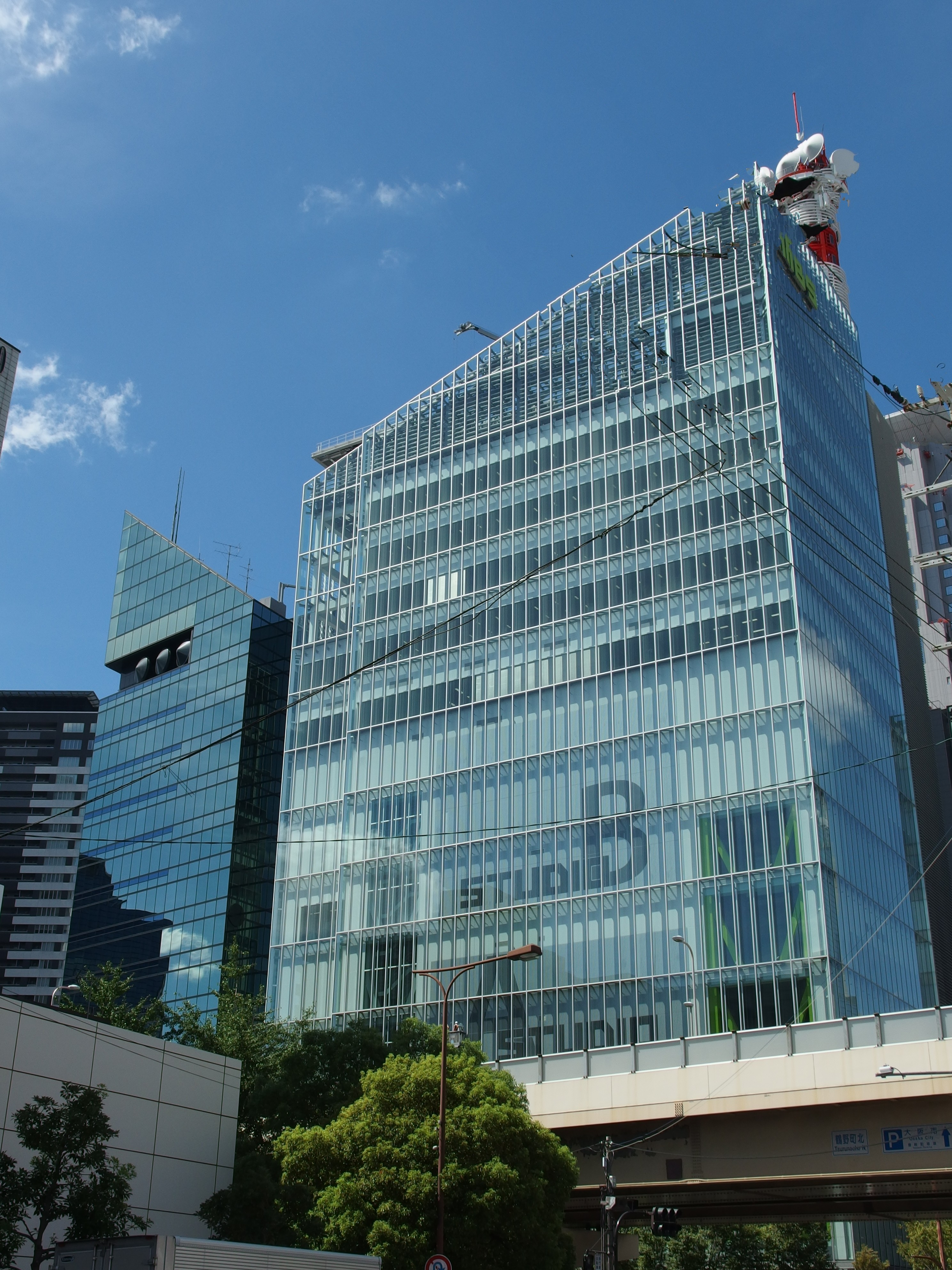
- Headquarters in Kita-ku, Osaka
- Kansai region; Japan
- City: Osaka
- Channels: Digital: 16 (UHF); Virtual: 4
- Branding: MBS

Programming
- Language: Japanese
- Affiliations: Japan News Network

Ownership
- Owner: MBS, Inc.

History
- First air date: March 1, 1959; 67 years ago
- Former call signs: JOOR-TV (1959–2011); JOOR-DTV (2003–2021)
- Former names: Mainichi Broadcasting System (1959–2026)
- Former channel numbers: Analog: 4 (VHF, 1959–2011)
- Former affiliations: NET/ANN (1959–1975)

Technical information
- Licensing authority: MIC
- ERP: 25 kW
- Transmitter coordinates: 34°40′38.01″N 135°40′44.27″E

Links
- Website: www.mbs.jp

Corporate information
- Native name: 株式会社MBS
- Romanized name: Kabushiki-gaisha MBS
- Formerly: Mainichi Broadcasting System Split Preparation, Inc. (2016–2017); Mainichi Broadcasting System, Inc. (2017–2026)
- Type: Subsidiary
- Industry: Television broadcasting
- Founded: July 28, 2016
- Owner: MBS Media Holdings
- Website: www.mbs.jp/mbs/

JOOY-DTV (channel 4), branded as MBS (previously known as Mainichi Broadcasting System (Note: Japanese: 毎日放送, Hepburn: Mainichi Hōsō) from 1959 to 2026), is a Japanese television station serving as the Kansai region key station of the Japan News Network. It is owned and operated by MBS, Inc. (Note: Japanese: 株式会社MBS, Hepburn: Kabushiki gaisha MBS) (previously known as Mainichi Broadcasting System, Inc. (Note: Japanese: 株式会社毎日放送, Hepburn: Kabushiki-gaisha Mainichi Hōsō) from 2017 to 2026), a subsidiary of MBS Media Holdings, with its studios based in the Kita-ku ward of Osaka.

From its inception in 1959 until 2021, MBS operated as a unified broadcaster, with its radio and television operations remaining intact until 2017, when a major restructuring placed the operations under the second incarnation of MBS. In 2021, the radio division was spun off as a separate, wholly owned subsidiary.

== Overview ==
MBS is a core station of the Japan News Network (JNN), with TBS TV serving as its key station. MBS is a member of the "Five Company Federation" (comprising MBS, TBS, HBC, CBC, and RKB) and is a major shareholder of TBS Holdings. It distributes G-Guide EPG data and previously distributed analog G-Guide program data to Tokushima Prefecture, where Shikoku Broadcasting, the only commercial TV station there, is affiliated with NNN/NNS.

For 16 years and one month, from the start of TV broadcasting until the networking issues were resolved, MBS was a key station of NET (now TV Asahi) and was subsequently affiliated with the All-Nippon News Network (ANN) upon its launch. During this time, Tokyo Channel 12 (currently TV Tokyo) was also affiliated with the station.

With the complete transition to digital terrestrial broadcasting on July 24, 2011, the listings in newspapers and TV information magazines changed from "Mainichi TV" (or "Mainichi"), which had been used since the start of television broadcasting, to "MBS TV" (or "MBS"). In the terrestrial digital TV G-Guide, it is listed as "MBS Mainichi Broadcasting". Until July 23, 2011, the general name was Mainichi Broadcasting Television, and when it was simply referred to as MBS during the analog era, it was listed as Mainichi TV in the radio and television columns of newspapers.

On April 1, 2017, the trade name was changed to "MBS Media Holdings", and both TV and radio broadcasting businesses were taken over by the "(New) Mainichi Broadcasting". Subsequently, on April 1, 2021, "MBS Radio Co., Ltd.", newly established as a wholly owned subsidiary of MBS Media Holdings, took over the radio broadcasting license and business held by Mainichi Broadcasting, while Mainichi Broadcasting moved exclusively to television (changing callsign JOOR-DTV to JOOY-DTV).

Among the broadcasting stations in Osaka, the company, Asahi Broadcasting Television, and Kansai Television are the three companies that opened earlier than their respective key stations in Tokyo (TBS Television, TV Asahi, and Fuji Television). This occurred because these three companies and the three key stations were unaffiliated at the time of their establishment. Despite being the oldest station in Japan to start radio broadcasting, MBS was the fourth station in Osaka to start TV broadcasting. This was roughly the same time as Asahi (Nippon Educational Television (NET TV) at that time), though MBS was one month behind. Conversely, Yomiuri TV and TV Osaka were established with the intention of joining their respective key stations, so they opened later than those key stations.

MBS has a strong connection with RKB Mainichi Broadcasting; the stations have co-produced and co-sold radio programs. On television, even during the pre-1975 era, Kyushu Asahi Broadcasting (KBC) sold in-house programs that were not organized or sponsored networks. They jointly established a health insurance union and present aspects of sister companies. Additionally, the remote control key ID for analog master stations and digital broadcasting is also "4". The station has a close relationship with Mitsubishi UFJ Bank and Resona Bank.

MBS was involved in the establishment of FM802 as a major shareholder alongside Nippon Broadcasting System. At the time of its establishment, it was organized by Nippon Broadcasting System, and the sales manager was seconded from Mainichi Broadcasting System. The stations often co-host events. In July 2019, a disaster information sharing partnership agreement was signed between FM802 and FM COCOLO, which is operated by the company.

== History ==
=== Early history ===
On June 1, 1958, New Japan Broadcasting changed its company name to Mainichi Broadcasting. Concurrently, Mainichi Broadcasting set up a television studio on the 8th and 9th floors of the south building of the Mainichi Osaka Kaikan, which was under construction, and built a signal transmitting station on the summit of Mount Ikoma. "Kansai Education and Culture Broadcasting", which had applied for an educational television license, also merged with MBS. Eighty-eight employees from Osaka Television joined MBS. Due to the decision of Radio Tokyo TV to maintain its network relationship with OTV, Mainichi Broadcasting faced a shortage of broadcast programs and had to change its broadcast start date from December 1, 1958, to March 1959. On March 1, it established a network relationship with Nippon Educational Television (later renamed NET Television, now TV Asahi). At 10:00 a.m. on March 1, 1959, MBS TV officially launched.

In the early days of Mainichi Broadcasting, most entertainment programs came from NET stations, while most self-produced programs were educational. In 1963, the daily ratings of channel 4 were 7.5%, second only to NHK and ABC's 8.1%. The average ratings in the evening period were 14.6%, second to OTV's 15.9%. In the mid-1960s, Mainichi Broadcasting participated in the establishment of Tokyo Channel 12 by the Japan Science and Technology Foundation. As Channel 12 quickly fell into operating difficulties after its launch, Mainichi Broadcasting began to broadcast some self-produced programs on Tokyo Channel 12 in 1967, but the situation did not improve. Consequently, the financial sector considered merging Channel 12 with Mainichi Broadcasting. However, due to opposition from the Mainichi Shimbun and The Nikkei's decision to rebuild Channel 12, this merger was not realized. Nevertheless, Mainichi Broadcasting maintained a cooperative relationship with Channel 12 and broadcast its own programs on the channel. In 1967, the MBS television license was changed from a quasi-educational station to a general comprehensive station, allowing for more entertainment programs. On April 1 of the same year, MBS began to broadcast color programs. By October 1970, all in-house MBS programs were in color. During the 1970 World Expo, Mainichi Broadcasting aired "Good Morning Expo" daily and produced a series of special programs. In 1971, Mainichi Broadcasting Corporation stopped airing NET TV's "23rd Show" on the grounds that the program content was too vulgar, causing a sensation in the Japanese television industry. That same year, the daily average viewership rating was 8.8%, ranking first for the first time. MBS's TV division revenue also exceeded that of Asahi Broadcasting in 1971.

Mainichi Broadcasting began to strengthen international cooperation in the 1960s. It became an associate member of the European Broadcasting Union in 1969 and signed cooperation agreements with foreign television stations such as WGN-TV in the United States, CBLT-TV in Canada, Czechoslovak Television, ZDF in West Germany, and TF1 in France. In 1962, Mainichi Broadcasting opened an American branch in New York, becoming the third Japanese television station to open a base there. Mainichi Broadcasting attaches great importance to international cultural cooperation and hosted the Kansai performance of the Vienna Boys' Choir in 1964.

=== Transition from NET/ANN to TBS/JNN ===
Logo used from 1966 to 2011.

When Mainichi Broadcasting withdrew from Osaka Television in 1958, OTV's successor, Asahi Broadcasting, inherited the network relationship between OTV and TBS. This resulted in the Kansai region TBS affiliate being Channel 6, controlled by the Asahi Shimbun. There was a reversal in the relationship between Tokyo and Osaka TV station networks. In the early 1970s, Japan's four national newspapers exchanged shares in television stations. The Asahi Shimbun and the Yomiuri Shimbun handed over their shares in TBS to the Mainichi Shimbun; the Asahi and the Mainichi Shimbun handed over their shares in Nippon Television to the Yomiuri; and the Nikkei equity of NET TV was transferred to the Asahi Shimbun. The Asahi Shimbun also requested ABC to join the NET/ANN network. After TBS learned of this news, it invited Mainichi Broadcasting to join TBS's network in the summer of 1974 and obtained Mainichi Broadcasting's consent. On November 19, 1974, TBS and Mainichi Broadcasting jointly announced that channel 4 would join the Japan News Network starting April 1, 1975. Compared with the NET/ANN period, MBS's broadcasts aired weekly during prime time, and the duration of the program broadcast nationwide in Japan was reduced from 5 hours and 50 minutes to 3 hours and 50 minutes. National broadcast programs outside prime time were also reduced from 6 hours and 35 minutes to 4 hours and 55 minutes. Concurrently, Mainichi Broadcasting ceased broadcasting Tokyo Channel 12 programs. Mainichi Broadcasting and Asahi Broadcasting also conducted large-scale program exchanges.

In the 1970s, TBS was known as the "hero of private broadcasting" and held a leading position in Japan's private television industry. As a result, MBS's ratings increased after switching networks. From October 1975 to March 1980, MBS won the "triple crown" of ratings. High ratings also boosted advertising performance. Mainichi Broadcasting ranked first in prime-time ratings for 26 consecutive weeks in the first half of 1978. In the same year, MBS's revenue reached 30.15 billion yen, and profit reached 5.12 billion yen. The revenue of both the television and radio divisions ranked first among Osaka stations. Beginning in the late 1970s, Mainichi Broadcasting took the lead in introducing electronic news gathering (ENG) among private stations in Osaka, which greatly improved its news gathering and editing capabilities. In 1978, Mainichi Broadcasting opened the Bonn branch, JNN's 11th overseas branch. In 1986, Mainichi Broadcasting opened its second overseas branch, the Manila branch. In terms of technological innovation, Mainichi Broadcasting began broadcasting stereo TV in 1982 and data information in 1986. In 1989, MBS introduced the Satellite News Relay (SNG) System.

In 1986, Mainichi Broadcasting regained the top position in advertising revenue among Osaka stations. In 1987, Mainichi Broadcasting's turnover reached 53.518 billion yen and profit reached 6.233 billion yen, setting high records at the time. Relying on the economic boom of Japan's bubble economy, Mainichi Broadcasting's revenue increased to 64.949 billion yen in 1990, with profits reaching 9.489 billion yen. Taking advantage of the introduction of satellite and cable TV in Japan, Mainichi Broadcasting invested in Japan Satellite Broadcasting in 1983. In 1989, Mainichi Broadcasting joined Sumitomo Corporation to invest in the establishment of SVN (Space Vision Network) and began to establish their own satellite TV channels. In 1993, SVN changed its name to Gaora and became a sports-oriented satellite TV channel.

=== Move to Chayamachi ===
The current company building was completed on September 1, 1990, on the site of the Hankyu Department Store Distribution Center in Chayamachi, Kita-ku, Osaka. Headquarters functions such as sales and accounting at Mainichi Osaka Kaikan, departments such as the news department at Senrioka Broadcasting Center, and some television and radio programs produced at Senrioka were moved to the new company building in Chayamachi. From that day, a special program was produced and broadcast for two days on television and five days on radio to commemorate the 40th anniversary of the station's opening and the start of broadcasting from the new building.

Since the grand opening on that day, most of the first floor has been used as an "atrium" (open space) for live broadcasting and recording of TV and radio programs and various events. The "MBS Goods Shop" (formerly "Mzono Shop", then "Nebula") and a branch of Tully's Coffee (originally a restaurant called "Starship" in 1990) also opened there. Upon opening, the second floor functioned as a concert hall under the name "Galaxy Hall". It was later converted into "Galaxy Studio" and used for live TV programs, public recordings, and events.

On March 31, 2001, a broadcasting studio called "MBS Studio in USJ" was opened at Universal Studios Japan.

=== Later history ===
On December 1, 2003, MBS, alongside ABC, KTV, YTV, and TVO, launched digital broadcasting.

In July 2010, the company announced the construction of a new building featuring a base isolation structure, comprising 15 floors above ground and one floor below, located on the north side of the headquarters. The project was subsidized under Osaka City's "Business/University Location Promotion Subsidy Program", and construction began in April 2011. On July 24, 2011, at noon, MBS, along with other television stations in the Kansai region, ceased analog broadcasting as part of the digital television transition across most Japanese prefectures.

The MBS building expansion was completed on September 4, 2013. The new structure was named "B Building," while the main building was designated "M Building." These names are derived from the initials of MBS. At the time the B Building began operations, there was no facility officially named "S Building."

The B Building held its grand opening on April 4, 2014, at 11:07:09. The timing was chosen to represent MBS TV's channel number (4) and MBS Radio's frequency (1179 kHz).

The B Building houses two television studios, offices, and a heliport. It stands approximately 36 m high (reaching about 117 m above ground including radio towers). Additionally, the relay truck depot in Senrioka was consolidated to this location. The conventional office building (renamed "M Building" following the completion of the B Building) was connected to the new structure via corridors on the 2nd, 12th, and 13th floors. On April 20, 2015, the master control room was updated to a new system located in the B Building.

In 2017, the television and radio operations of MBS were taken over by the second incarnation of Mainichi Broadcasting after the company restructured into MBS Media Holdings.

In 2018, to mark the 60th anniversary of MBS TV, construction began on the second floor of the M Building to renovate it into a "Live Center," aiming to improve live broadcasting capabilities and strengthen cooperation between news and production departments. Following the remodeling of the space, including Studio C (Galaxy Studio), into an "Information Floor" linked to live information programs, the center began operations on January 28, 2019. Additionally, the "Chapla Stage" on the first floor of the M Building was renovated to incorporate it into the Live Center.

On March 2, 2023, Sentai Filmworks and MBS announced a multi-year partnership and distribution agreement, which began with The Most Heretical Last Boss Queen. The multi-year partnership was then extended in August 2026, in which Sentai's HIDIVE streaming service would begin simulcasting MBS's upcoming lineup, starting with HIDIVE's streaming of Nia Liston: The Merciless Maiden as part of the extended partnership.

=== Spin-off of radio operations and rename ===
On May 28, 2020, MBS announced that it would spin off its radio division into a separate company known as MBS Radio, leaving the MBS entity as a sole television broadcaster. The split was completed by April 1 of the following year, and as a result, the TV callsign was changed to JOOY-DTV. On July 1, 2026, it was announced that the company would be renamed to its brand name, MBS alongside two of its group companies.

== Programming ==
- Animeism
- Dramaism
- Drama Tokku
- Drama Shower

== See also ==
- MBS Radio (Japan)
