= MBS Radio (Japan) =

Radio station in Osaka, Japan

JOOR
- Logo used since 2021

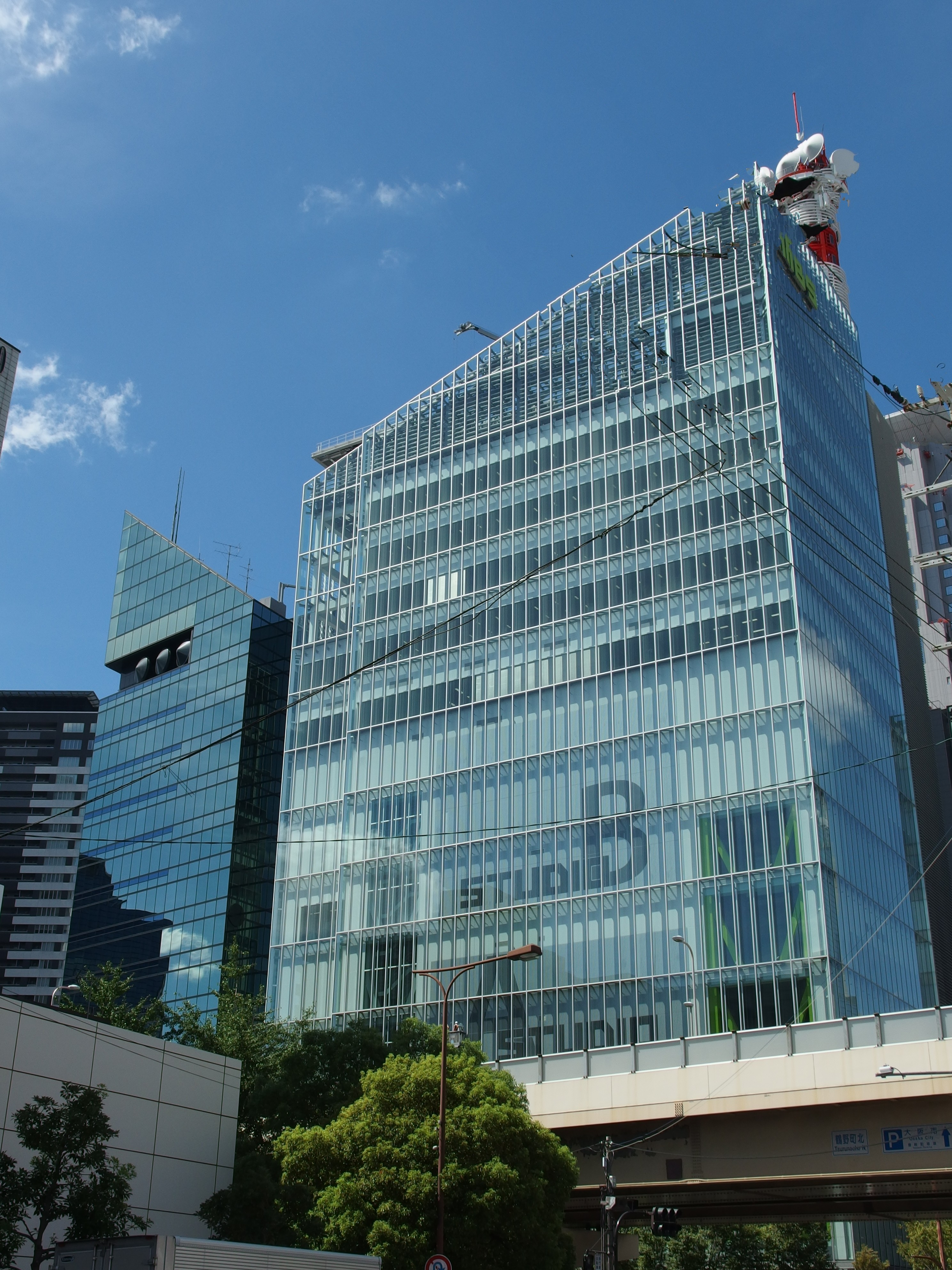
- Headquarters in Kita-ku, Osaka
- Osaka; Japan
- Broadcast area: Kansai region
- Frequencies: 1179 kHz (AM); 90.6 MHz (FM)
- Branding: MBS Radio

Programming
- Language: Japanese
- Format: News, Talk, Sports, Music
- Affiliations: Japan Radio Network (JRN); National Radio Network (NRN)

Ownership
- Owner: MBS Radio, Inc.

History
- First air date: September 1, 1951
- Former frequencies: 1951–1977: 1210 kHz; 1977–1978: 1180 kHz
- Call sign meaning: JO; Osaka; Radio and TV

Technical information
- Licensing authority: MIC
- Power: 50 kW
- Transmitter coordinates: 34°31′5.14″N 135°26′40.92″E

Links
- Webcast: radiko.jp (Japan only)
- Website: www.mbs1179.com (in Japanese)

Corporate information
- Company
- Native name: 株式会社MBSラジオ
- Company type: Subsidiary
- Industry: Radio broadcasting
- Founded: May 28, 2020; 6 years ago (as Mainichi Broadcasting System Radio Split Preparation, Inc.)
- Headquarters: Chayamachi, Kita-ku, Osaka, Japan
- Key people: Genichiro Hara (president)
- Owner: MBS Media Holdings

MBS Radio (MBSラジオ, Emubīesu Rajio) is an AM radio station based in Osaka, Japan. It is wholly owned by MBS Radio, a subsidiary of MBS Media Holdings.

It is a member station of Japan Radio Network (JRN) and National Radio Network (NRN).

Prior to 2021, the station was directly owned by MBS alongside its television division. A 2021 restructuring caused MBS to spin off its radio division under a separate subsidiary.

== History ==
=== Early years ===
The New Japan Broadcasting System, Inc. (新日本放送株式会社, Shin-Nippon Hōsō Kabushiki-gaisha; NJB) was founded on December 27, 1950.

After the end of World War II, Mainichi Shimbun intended to establish a private radio station, and the establishment of the radio station was placed in charge of the then editor-in-chief, Shinzo Takahashi. At the same time, Kansai businessmen Shinyoshi Terada and Aiji Iwasaki are also interested in getting involved in the broadcasting industry. The two hit it off immediately, and held a symposium on December 11, 1945, and decided to establish the "New Japan Broadcasting" company. However, at that time, the Commander-in-Chief of the Allied Forces in Japan preferred to continue the Japanese broadcasting industry's monopoly system of the Japan Broadcasting Corporation (NHK) (among the four Allied countries, especially the Soviet Union, NHK preferred to monopolize it), and did not allow private radio stations to be established, so this idea wasn't quickly achieved.

From October 1947, the occupied government gradually began to favor allowing the establishment of private broadcasters. The "New Japan Broadcasting" plan was revived as a result, and received support from Keihanshin Kyuko Electric Railway (now Hankyu Electric Railway), Nippon Electric and other companies. On December 27, 1948, New Japan Broadcasting once again submitted an application for a broadcasting license, which was accepted on January 25 of the following year. With the passing of the "Three Radio Laws" (after the passing of the Radio Law, the Broadcasting Law, and the Law on the Establishment of the Radio Supervisory Committee) in 1950, the establishment of private broadcasting was officially permitted. On June 10 of the same year, New Japan Broadcasting held its first promoter meeting. On December 16, New Japan Broadcasting held a founding meeting and registered the company on December 27. At that time, 12 operators in the Kinki area, supported by Mainichi Shimbun, were most likely to obtain a license. Since Tokyo had successfully integrated various applicants into one company at that time, the Radio Supervision Committee also intended to replicate this process in Osaka, but it encountered strong opposition from both New Japan Broadcasting and Asahi Broadcasting. On April 21, 1951, New Japan Broadcasting received a preliminary license. On July 8, New Japan Broadcasting launched its first experimental radio wave. From August 15 to 31, New Japan Broadcasting conducted a trial broadcast. At 11:59:30 on September 1, 1951, New Japan Broadcasting officially launched, and tied with Chubu-Nippon Broadcasting to become Japan's first private radio station (but Chubu Nippon Broadcasting Station started at 6:30 in the morning). In February 1952, the New Japan Broadcasting Union was established.

Two years after the launch of New Japan Broadcasting, Nippon Television, Japan's first private television station, launched. New Japan Broadcasting and Asahi Broadcasting also jointly applied for a television broadcasting license in the name of Osaka Television Broadcasting in August 1952, and obtained a preliminary license in December 1954, and officially established the company in May 1955. Although Osaka Television started broadcasting on December 1, 1956. However, both New Japan Broadcasting and Asahi Broadcasting believe that Osaka TV broadcasting is only a compromise decision when the number of channels is limited. After the Ministry of Postal and Postal Affairs revised the channel plan in May 1957 and allocated two private television channels in the Osaka area (one of which was an educational television station), New Japan Broadcasting and Asahi Broadcasting immediately began to establish their own television stations. However, in addition to Asahi Broadcasting and New Japan Broadcasting, there were also "Kansai TV" of the Sankei Shimbun Department, "Kinki TV" jointly formed by Kyoto Broadcasting and Kobe Broadcasting, "New Osaka TV" of the Yomiuri Shimbun Department, and those interested in acquiring educational television. Licensed respectively as "Kinki Education and Culture Television" and "Kansai Education and Culture Broadcasting", a total of 7 operators applied for two television licenses; the competition is extremely fierce. After that, the comprehensive television license in Osaka area was obtained by "Dai Kansai Television" formed by the merger of "Kansai Television" and "Kinki Television" (the name was later changed back to Kansai Television). Asahi Broadcasting, New Japan Broadcasting, and Shin-Osaka Television turned to compete for educational television licenses. After Tanaka Kakuei took office as the Post Minister in July 1959, he used political skills to move the TV channel plan in the Himeji area to Osaka, so that two new private TV stations could be built in the Osaka area. Tanaka Kakuei also proposed in October of this year that the two new TV stations in the Osaka area should be acquired by one of New Osaka TV, New Japan Broadcasting and Asahi Broadcasting. However, the solution was to merge with Osaka TV Broadcasting without obtaining a new station license. Eventually, New Japan Broadcasting applied to obtain a new television license, and Hankyu Electric Railway Capital withdrew from New Japan Broadcasting. Asahi Broadcasting merged with Osaka Television Broadcasting. On October 22, New Japan Broadcasting obtained a television preliminary license.

NJB commenced radio broadcasting from the Hankyu Department Store on September 1, 1951, as the second commercial radio station in Japan.

NJB founded Osaka Television Co., Ltd. (大阪テレビ放送株式会社, Ōsaka Terebi Hōsō Kabushiki-gaisha; OTV) on December 1, 1956, with Asahi Broadcasting Corporation (ABC).

NJB was renamed to "Mainichi Broadcasting System, Inc." on June 1, 1958.

In 1960 a broadcasting studio was completed in Senri.

In 1964 MBS formed a radio network with TBS Radio and RKB Radio, which evolved into Japan Radio Network (JRN) in 1965.

On May 15, 1977, the frequency of MBS Radio changed from 1210 kHz to 1180 kHz.

The American Broadcasting Company (ABC, not to be confused with the Asahi Broadcasting Corporation) acquired a 5% stake on New Japan Broadcasting in 1951 and remained as a shareholder in MBS through the 1970s; ABC retained 5% of all shares in 1977, making it the third largest shareholder at the time.

In 1990, the new headquarters and studios was completed in Chayamachi, Kita Ward, Osaka for the station's 40th anniversary. MBS moved and merged the headquarters and studio on September 1; the registered headquarters from the Mainichi Shimbun Osaka Head Office, and the broadcasting studio from Senri.

On October 1, 2013, the Takaishi Solar Plant was situated in the area of MBS Takaishi Radio Transmitter.

On April 4, 2014, the B Building was opened.

On May 15, 2010, MBS began to simulcast its radio broadcasts online within the Kansai region via Radiko together with ABC, OBC, FM 802, FM Osaka, and FM Cocolo.

=== Later history ===
On April 1, 2016, the radio and television divisions of MBS were taken over by the second incarnation of Mainichi Broadcasting System. On May 28, 2020, MBS announced that it would split the radio division into a separate wholly owned entity. The split was completed on April 1 of the following year with MBS Radio retaining the JOOR callsign.

== Availability ==
JOOR

- Frequency: 1210 kHz → 1180 kHz → 1179 kHz; 90.6 MHz FM
- Power
  - Osaka: 50 kW
  - Kyoto: 300 W
- Broadcasting hours: from 4:30 on Mondays until 26:30 on Sundays (with daily starting at 4:00 from Tuesday until Sunday)
- Time signal: 1046.502 Hz (C6, on the hour every hour)

The station had an AM relay in Kyoto, which shut down on October 29, 2023.

== See also ==
- MBS TV
