= ABC Television (Japan) =

JOAY-DTV
- Logo used since 2018 (Note: The logo's style has been in use since 2008.)

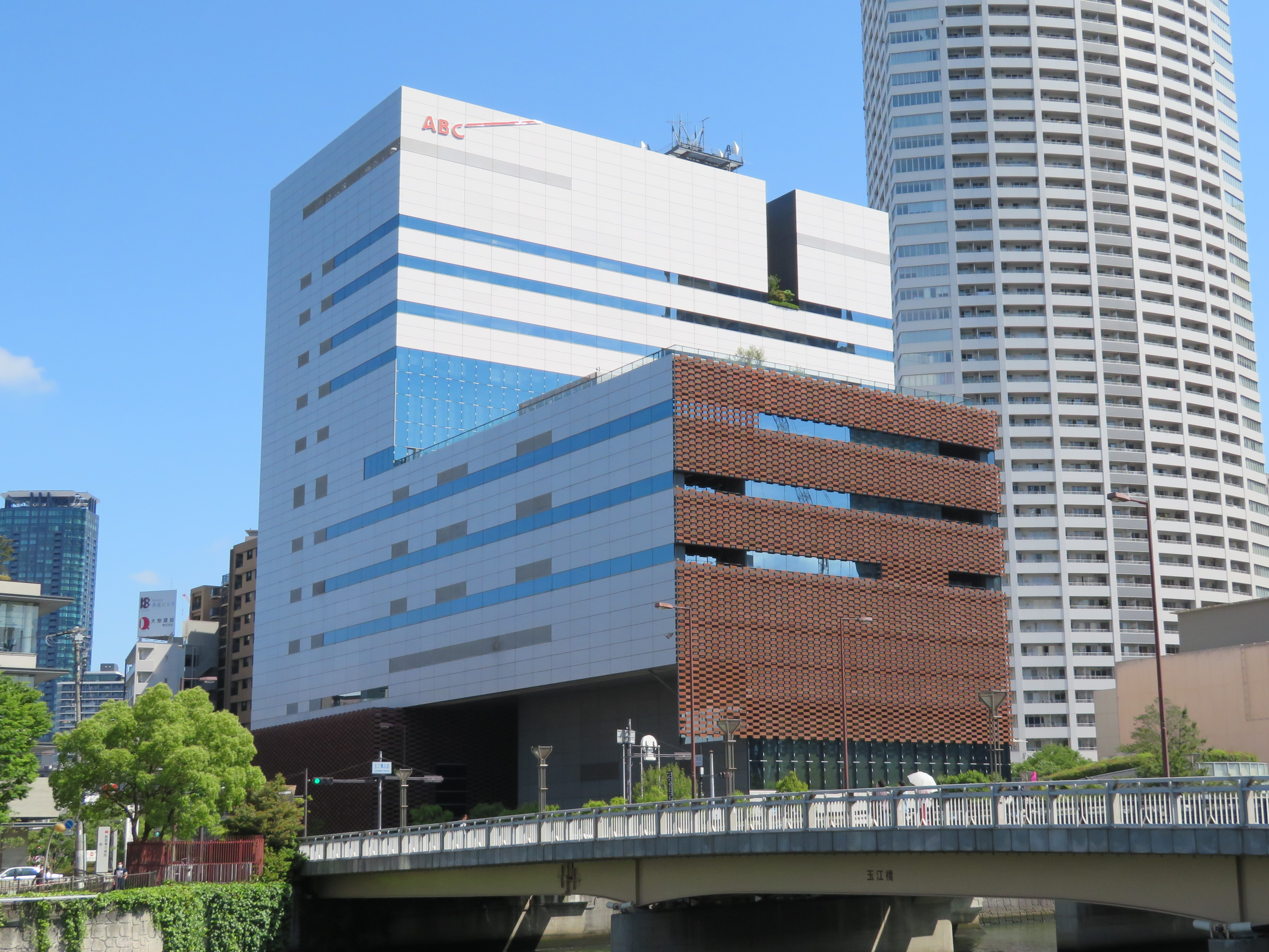
- Headquarters in Fukushima-ku, Osaka
- Kansai region; Japan
- City: Osaka
- Channels: Digital: 15 (UHF); Virtual: 6
- Branding: ABC TV; ABC; ABC Japan (international operations)

Programming
- Language: Japanese
- Affiliations: All-Nippon News Network

Ownership
- Owner: Asahi Television Broadcasting Corporation

History
- First air date: December 1, 1956; 69 years ago
- Former call signs: JOBX-TV (1956–1959); JONR-TV (1959–2011); JONR-DTV (2003–2018)
- Former names: Osaka Television (1956–1959); ABC-Osaka Television (1959); Asahi Broadcasting (1959–2018)
- Former channel numbers: 6 (analog, VHF, 1956–2011)
- Former affiliations: NTV (de facto, 1 December 1956–27 August 1958); TBS/JNN (1956–1975)
- Call sign meaning: none; sequentially assigned

Technical information
- Licensing authority: MIC

Links
- Website: www.asahi.co.jp

JOAY-DTV (channel 6), branded as ABC TV (Japanese: ABCテレビ, Hepburn: ABC Terebi) is a Japanese television station carrying All-Nippon News Network for the Kansai region. Based in Fukushima-ku, Osaka, the station is owned-and-operated by the Asahi Television Broadcasting Corporation (Japanese: 朝日放送テレビ株式会社, Hepburn: Asahihōsō Terebi Kabushiki-gaisha), a wholly-owned subsidiary of the Asahi Broadcasting Group Holdings Corporation.

From 1956 to 1959, the license was owned by the Osaka Television Broadcasting Co., Ltd. (大阪テレビ放送株式会社, Ōsaka Terebi Hōsō Kabushiki-gaisha; OTV), controlled by ABC and New Japan Broadcasting (later Mainichi Broadcasting System). The company was founded in 1952 and began broadcasting on 1 December 1956. MBS left in preparation for the establishment of its own television station; this caused ABC to become the sole owner. The takeover began on 1 March 1959 and culminated on 1 June; after that it became ABC.

== History ==
=== Osaka Television ===
==== Background ====
The idea of bringing commercial television to Japan stemmed from Yomiuri Shimbun president Matsutarō Shōriki, who in July 1952 would have a license granted for Nippon Television. At the time, several companies showed interest in a bid for an Osaka station, such as the Sankei Shimbun, Kyoto Broadcasting and the Yomiuri Shimbun. The two existing radio stations in Osaka, Asahi Broadcasting and New Japan Broadcasting, decided to reject their initial separate television license applications and joined their efforts under Osaka Television (name amended to Osaka Television Broadcasting the following year).

Preparations began in 1953 with the acquisition of a plot of land at Hamadori in the Dōjima neighborhood which would serve as its headquarters, and issued a logo design contest in newspapers. On 3 December 1955, the station obtained a preliminary license using the callsign JOBX-TV. It set up a 40% maximum for in-house productions and the rest would consist of programs from the Tokyo stations (KRT and NTV) to maximize profits. In order to boost its popularity, it installed sixty television sets in several parts of Kansai before its launch. By September 1956, the station hoped to be on air on 1 December and was already equipped with a US$190,000 remote unit. At the time, there were an estimated 89,300 television sets for a population of nearly thirteen million people in Kansai.

==== On air ====
OTV opened on target: test transmissions were conducted throughout November with two and a half hours of daily programming; then at 9:30a.m. on 1 December 1956, regular service began. Half of its programming at launch time consisted of dramas, viewer participation shows and news bulletins. OTV had strong appeal to television set owners; up until then, viewers had a habit of watching NHK (channel 4, later moved to channel 2).

In the summer of 1958, OTV acquired Japan's first videotape recording machines from US company Ampex, in a two-piece order. That year, it became the first television station to broadcast atop Mount Fuji.

KRT often used OTV as a talent pool, at a time where Osaka had four times the amount of talent available in Tokyo; 60% of OTV's programming was sourced from both KRT and NTV

=== ABC Television ===
==== Background of OTV's demise and collapse into ABC ====
In January 1957, the Ministry of Posts and Telecommunications announced a new channel frequency plan, where Osaka gained more television stations. Both ABC and MBS wanted to establish their own television stations. Concerns over the limited amount of channels on the VHF band caused ABC to reject its plan, leaving MBS alone. ABC had no choice than to merge with OTV. 200 staff wanted to remain under the new company, while 104 opted to join MBS. With the launch of Yomiuri TV, NTV decided to halt airing its programs on OTV; that station became its first commercial competitor.

With the opening of MBS on 1 March 1959, the station initiated a three-month transitional phase as ABC-Osaka Television on 1 June 1959, the merger was complete and the station became Asahi Broadcasting Television (ABC Television), using the JONR-TV callsign.

The JOBX-TV callsign now resides on Oita Asahi Broadcasting, which opened on 1 October 1993. JONR-TV (since 2003 operating as JONR-DTV; the analog calls were discarded in 2011) was later spun off at the beginning of fiscal 2018 (1 April 2018), whereupon it became JOAY-DTV.

==== TBS/JNN period ====
Following the OTV-ABC merger, ABC joined the Japan News Network as a founding station and MBS joined a de facto network between it and NET. This led to administrative problems that were only solved in 1975: up until then, ABC was affiliated to a Mainichi-backed network (TBS/JNN), was largely funded by the Asahi Shimbun, while MBS fared the opposite. The Asahi Shimbun held two meetings in 1963 and 1964 to find a way for NET to convert into a regular commercial station (which eventually converted into a commercial license in 1974).

In July 1960, ABC was the most watched commercial television station in the Kansai region, with a share of 24.6% (followed by YTV with 21.5%, KTV with 19.8% and MBS with 12.2%). In April of that year, ABC set up a labor union. ABC was listed on the Osaka Securities Exchange in October 1961, then on 1–3 December, it suspended its television operations due to a large-scale strike.

ABC was one of the first television stations to broadcast in color in Japan, using the NTSC-J standard (adopted in 1959). The first color broadcast took place on 10 September 1960; initially the station carried only four hours of color programming a week. In 1966, it moved to Oyodo South. During Expo '70, it had complete coverage of the event. For the twentieth anniversary of ABC, the station produced The Emperor's Century, which was broadcast on the entire TBS/JNN network. Beginning in 1974, ABC's weekend programming was fixed on a two-day period, Saturdays and Sundays.

==== Joining NET/ANN ====
The Asahi Shimbun, one of the company's largest shareholders, had long-time dissatisfaction at the fact that ABC was a TBS/JNN affiliate, considering that TBS/JNN had ties with the Mainichi Shimbun. A meeting was held in 1963 proposing a three-point broadcasting policy:

1. that NET should be renamed TV Asahi;
2. that ABC should switch from TBS/JNN to NET;
3. and that NET-affiliated stations should open in Nagoya and Fukuoka.

Subsequently, in 1964, a second meeting took place, where NET released its own three-point consensus:

1. that NET should become a full-service (and not educational) commercial television station;
2. that NET should not depend on other newspapers in its corporate structure;
3. and that NET should improve its operating abilities.

Despite these proposals, by 1964, Kyushu Asahi Broadcasting, the NET affiliate in Fukuoka Prefecture dropped Fuji TV to become a full-time NET affiliate, sending Fuji TV to Television Nishinippon and in 1969, Chukyo TV launched in the Chukyo region as a dual NET/NTV affiliate. Despite this by 1973, CTV dropped NET/ANN to become a full time NTV/NNN/NNS affiliate, sending all remaining NET/ANN programs that aired on CTV to Nagoya TV.

In the mid-1970s, with the strengthening of NET's network and a rearrangement in the shareholding structures of the Tokyo-based television stations, the conditions met by the Asahi Shimbun a decade before were practically met. This led to a new Asahi bid to finalize the affiliation switch in Osaka; simultaneously, MBS opted to join TBS/JNN while ABC joined NET. The affiliation switch occurred on 1 April 1975.

At the time, NET was the weakest among the four national commercial networks, and NET's program production capacity was lagging far behind that of TBS. The loss of TBS/JNN's high-rated programming proved to be a negative coup for ABC: ratings fell from first to last among the four stations, and its revenue fell from 1.292 billion yen in 1974 to 225 million yen in 1975. The cut in high-quality programming caused it to rethink its strategies by improving the quality of its own programs. In 1975, it built the ABC Kaikan building in Shiba, Minato, Tokyo, with two underground floors and eleven floors above ground level. Floors 5 to 7 were used as ABC's Tokyo offices. A sister station agreement with Antenne 2 was signed on February of 1977.

==== TV Asahi era ====
On April 1, 1977, channel 10 in the Kanto region rebranded from NET to TV Asahi.
