= MBS Media Holdings =

Radio and television broadcasting company

Coordinates: 34°42′30.32″N 135°29′59.54″E

MBS Media Holdings, Inc.

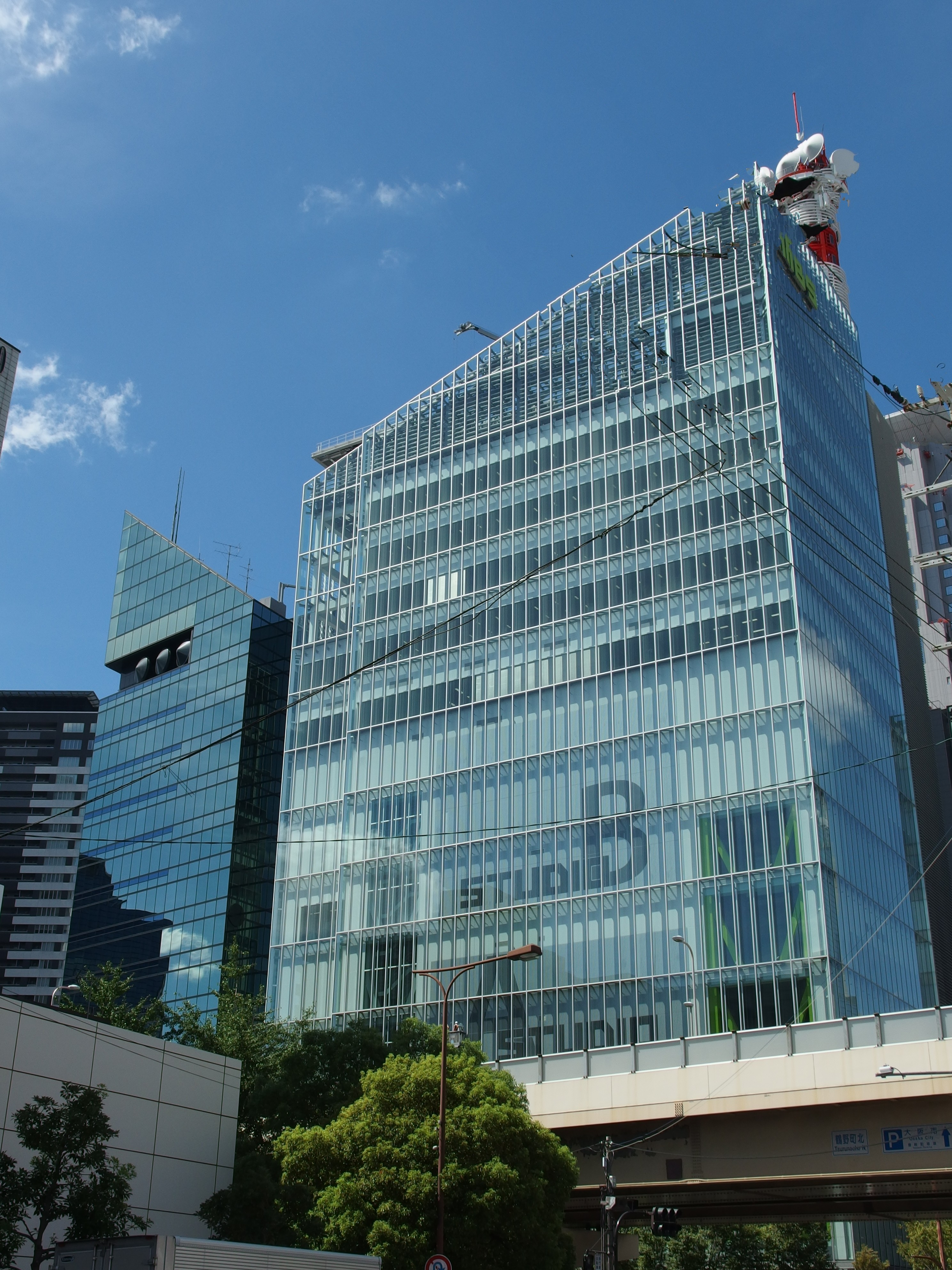
- Native name: 株式会社MBSメディアホールディングス
- Romanized name: Kabushiki-gaisha MBS mediahōrudingusu
- Formerly: New Japan Broadcasting System (1950-1958); Mainichi Broadcasting System, Inc. (1958-2017)
- Type: Kabushiki gaisha
- Industry: Media
- Founded: December 27, 1950 (as New Japan Broadcasting Co.)
- Headquarters: Chayamachi, Kita-ku, Osaka, Japan
- Number of locations: 8 offices in Japan, 1 in Shanghai, China
- Area served: Worldwide
- Key people: Kazutomo Kawauchi (President)
- Services: Broadcast television and radio
- Revenue: ▲¥63,165,224 thousand (2012); ¥61,160,117 thousand (2011)
- Operating income: ▲¥3,331,635 thousand (2012); ¥2,961,176 thousand (2011)
- Net income: ▲¥2,190,814 thousand (2012); ¥1,908,886 thousand (2011)
- Total assets: ▲¥100,919,765 thousand (2012); ¥96,316,971 thousand (2011)
- Total equity: ▲¥84,310,568 thousand (2012); ¥81,033,091 thousand (2011)
- Owner: As per 31 March 2016: Sony Group Corporation (15.87); TBS Holdings (9.75%); Resona Bank (4.42%); MUFG Bank (4.42%); Sumitomo Mitsui Banking Corporation (4.42%); NEC (3.56%); Obayashi Corporation (3.19%); Nippon Life (2.94%); Dai-ichi Life (2.82% managed by the Trust & Custody Services Bank); Dentsu (2.46%)
- Number of employees: 650 (non-consolidated, June 2012)
- Subsidiaries: MBS; MBS Radio; Gaora; MBS Keys; MBS Teclas; Myrica Music; Picoli; Yami; MBS Facilities; MBS Live Entertainment; Toromi; Vogaro; Hinata Life; App Land; Smart Share
- Website: www.mbs-mhd.jp

Former wordmark used until August 2011

MBS Media Holdings, Inc. (株式会社MBSメディアホールディングス, Kabushiki-gaisha MBS mediahōrudingusu; MBS Media Holdings Stock-Company), or MBS, is a radio and television broadcasting media holding company headquartered in Osaka, Japan.

It is a parent company of a television station named MBS and a radio station named MBS Radio.

In 2017, MBS restructured as a holding company, splitting the broadcasting division into a separate company until 2021, when MBS Radio was formed to take over MBS' radio business.

== History ==
=== Early years ===
The New Japan Broadcasting System, Inc. (新日本放送株式会社, Shin-Nippon Hōsō Kabushiki-gaisha; NJB) was founded on December 27, 1950.

After the end of World War II, Mainichi Shimbun intended to establish a private radio station, and the establishment of the radio station was placed in charge of the then editor-in-chief, Shinzo Takahashi. At the same time, Kansai businessmen Shinyoshi Terada and Aiji Iwasaki are also interested in getting involved in the broadcasting industry. The two hit it off immediately, and held a symposium on December 11, 1945, and decided to establish the "New Japan Broadcasting" company. However, at that time, the Commander-in-Chief of the Allied Forces in Japan preferred to continue the Japanese broadcasting industry's monopoly system of the Japan Broadcasting Corporation (NHK) (among the four Allied countries, especially the Soviet Union, NHK preferred to monopolize it), and did not allow private radio stations to be established, so this idea wasn't quickly achieved.

From October 1947, the occupied government gradually began to favor allowing the establishment of private broadcasters. The "New Japan Broadcasting" plan was revived as a result, and received support from Keihanshin Kyuko Electric Railway (now Hankyu Electric Railway), Nippon Electric and other companies. On December 27, 1948, New Japan Broadcasting once again submitted an application for a broadcasting license, which was accepted on January 25 of the following year. With the passing of the "Three Radio Laws" (after the passing of the Radio Law, the Broadcasting Law, and the Law on the Establishment of the Radio Supervisory Committee) in 1950, the establishment of private broadcasting was officially permitted. On June 10 of the same year, New Japan Broadcasting held its first promoter meeting. On December 16, New Japan Broadcasting held a founding meeting and registered the company on December 27. At that time, 12 operators in the Kinki area, supported by Mainichi Shimbun, were most likely to obtain a license. Since Tokyo had successfully integrated various applicants into one company at that time, the Radio Supervision Committee also intended to replicate this process in Osaka, but it encountered strong opposition from both New Japan Broadcasting and Asahi Broadcasting. On April 21, 1951, New Japan Broadcasting received a preliminary license. On July 8, New Japan Broadcasting launched its first experimental radio wave. From August 15 to 31, New Japan Broadcasting conducted a trial broadcast. At 11:59:30 on September 1, 1951, New Japan Broadcasting officially launched, and tied with Chubu-Nippon Broadcasting to become Japan's first private radio station (but Chubu Nippon Broadcasting Station started at 6:30 in the morning). In February 1952, the New Japan Broadcasting Union was established.

Two years after the launch of New Japan Broadcasting, Nippon Television, Japan's first private television station, launched. New Japan Broadcasting and Asahi Broadcasting also jointly applied for a television broadcasting license in the name of Osaka Television Broadcasting in August 1952, and obtained a preliminary license in December 1954, and officially established the company in May 1955. Although Osaka Television started broadcasting on December 1, 1956. However, both New Japan Broadcasting and Asahi Broadcasting believe that Osaka TV broadcasting is only a compromise decision when the number of channels is limited. After the Ministry of Postal and Postal Affairs revised the channel plan in May 1957 and allocated two private television channels in the Osaka area (one of which was an educational television station), New Japan Broadcasting and Asahi Broadcasting immediately began to establish their own television stations. However, in addition to Asahi Broadcasting and New Japan Broadcasting, there were also "Kansai TV" of the Sankei Shimbun Department, "Kinki TV" jointly formed by Kyoto Broadcasting and Kobe Broadcasting, "New Osaka TV" of the Yomiuri Shimbun Department, and those interested in acquiring educational television. Licensed respectively as "Kinki Education and Culture Television" and "Kansai Education and Culture Broadcasting", a total of 7 operators applied for two television licenses; the competition is extremely fierce. After that, the comprehensive television license in Osaka area was obtained by "Dai Kansai Television" formed by the merger of "Kansai Television" and "Kinki Television" (the name was later changed back to Kansai Television). Asahi Broadcasting, New Japan Broadcasting, and Shin-Osaka Television turned to compete for educational television licenses. After Tanaka Kakuei took office as the Post Minister in July 1959, he used political skills to move the TV channel plan in the Himeji area to Osaka, so that two new private TV stations could be built in the Osaka area. Tanaka Kakuei also proposed in October of this year that the two new TV stations in the Osaka area should be acquired by one of New Osaka TV, New Japan Broadcasting and Asahi Broadcasting. However, the solution was to merge with Osaka TV Broadcasting without obtaining a new station license. Eventually, New Japan Broadcasting applied to obtain a new television license, and Hankyu Electric Railway Capital withdrew from New Japan Broadcasting. Asahi Broadcasting merged with Osaka Television Broadcasting. On October 22, New Japan Broadcasting obtained a television preliminary license.

NJB commenced radio broadcasting from the Hankyu Department Store on September 1, 1951, as the second commercial radio station in Japan. NJB founded Osaka Television Co., Ltd. (大阪テレビ放送株式会社, Ōsaka Terebi Hōsō Kabushiki-gaisha; OTV) on December 1, 1956 with Asahi Broadcasting Corporation (ABC). NJB was renamed "Mainichi Broadcasting System, Inc." on June 1, 1958. On March 1, 1959, after selling all stocks of OTV to ABC, MBS started analog terrestrial television broadcasting independently from OTV, and made a network with Nippon Educational Television Co., Ltd. (NET, the predecessor of TV Asahi Corporation). In 1960 a broadcasting studio was completed in Senri.

In 1964 MBS formed a radio network with TBS Radio and RKB Radio, which evolved into Japan Radio Network (JRN) in 1965. in 1974 MBS joined the All-Nippon News Network (ANN). However, MBS joined the Japan News Network (JNN) on March 31, 1975 due to then-president of the Asahi Shimbun's order to the ABC to switch its flagship station to NET. On May 15, 1977, the frequency of MBS Radio changed from 1210 kHz to 1180 kHz.

The American Broadcasting Company (ABC, not to be confused with the Asahi Broadcasting Corporation) acquired a 5% stake on New Japan Broadcasting in 1951 and remained as a shareholder in MBS through the 1970s; ABC retained 5% of all shares in 1977, making it the third largest shareholder at the time.

=== Early years as MBS ===
On June 1, 1958, New Japan Broadcasting changed the company name to Mainichi Broadcasting. At the same time, Mainichi Broadcasting set up a television studio on the 8th and 9th floors of the south building of the Mainichi Osaka Kaikan under construction, and built a signal transmitting station on the top of Ikoma Mountain. "Kansai Education and Culture Broadcasting", which applied for an educational television license, also merged with MBS. Osaka Television Broadcasting has 88 employees participating at MBS. At the same time, due to the decision of KRT TV station (now TBS TV station) to maintain the network relationship with Osaka Television Broadcasting, Mainichi Broadcasting was faced with the dilemma of insufficient broadcast programs and had to change the broadcast date from December 1, 1958 to March 1959. On March 1, it established a network relationship with Nihon Educational Television (later renamed NET Television, now TV Asahi). At 10 a.m. on March 1, 1959, the MBS TV broadcast was officially launched.

In the early days of Mainichi Broadcasting, most of the entertainment programs came from NET stations, while most of the self-produced programs were educational programs. In 1963, the daily ratings of Mainichi Broadcasting were 7.5%, second only to NHK and Asahi Broadcasting's 8.1%. The average ratings in the evening period are 14.6%, second only to Asahi Broadcasting's 15.9%. In the mid-1960s, Mainichi Broadcasting participated in the establishment of Tokyo Channel 12 by the Japan Science and Technology Foundation. As Tokyo Channel 12 quickly fell into operating difficulties after its launch, Mainichi Broadcasting began to broadcast some self-produced programs on Tokyo Channel 12 in 1967, but the situation has not improved. Therefore, the financial circle once had the idea of merging Tokyo Channel 12 with Mainichi Broadcasting. However, due to opposition from the Mainichi Shimbun and Nihon Keizai Shimbun's decision to rebuild Tokyo Channel 12, this idea could not be realized. However, Mainichi Broadcasting still has a cooperative relationship with Tokyo Channel 12 and broadcasts its own programs on Tokyo Channel 12. In 1967, the MBS TV license was changed from a quasi-educational station to a general comprehensive station, which could broadcast more entertainment programs. On April 1 of the same year, MBS began to broadcast color programs. In October 1970, all in-house MBS programs were in color. During the 1970 World Expo, Mainichi Broadcasting broadcast "Good Morning Expo" every day and produced and broadcast a series of special programs. In 1971, Mainichi Broadcasting Corporation stopped airing NET TV's "23rd Show" on the grounds that the program content was too vulgar, causing a sensation in the Japanese television industry. In the same year, the daily average viewership rating was 8.8%, ranking first for the first time. In the same year, MBS's TV division revenue also exceeded Asahi Broadcasting.

Mainichi Broadcasting began to strengthen international cooperation in the 1960s. It became an associate member of the European Broadcasting Union in 1969 and signed cooperation agreements with foreign television stations such as WGN-TV in the United States, Czechoslovak Television, ZDF in West Germany and TF1 in France. In 1962, Mainichi Broadcasting opened a North American branch in New York, becoming the third Japanese television station to open a base in there. Mainichi Broadcasting attaches great importance to international cultural cooperation and hosted the Kansai Performance of the Vienna Boys' Choir in 1964.

=== Changing networks ===
When Mainichi Broadcasting withdrew from Osaka Television in 1958, Osaka Television's successor, Asahi Broadcasting, inherited the network relationship between Osaka Television and TBS . This resulted in the fact that the affiliate network member station of Tokyo's Mainichi Shimbun TV station TBS in Osaka is Asahi Broadcasting of Asahi Shimbun Capital, while the affiliate network member station of Tokyo's Asahi Shimbun TV station NET in Osaka is the daily broadcast of Mainichi Shimbun Capital. There is a reversal in the relationship between Tokyo and Osaka TV station networks. In the early 1970s, Japan's four national newspapers conducted an exchange of shares in television stations. The Asahi Shimbun and the Yomiuri Shimbun handed over their shares in TBS to the Mainichi Shimbun; the Asahi and the Mainichi Shimbun handed over their shares in Nippon TV to the Yomiuri; the Nikkei The equity of NET TV station was transferred to Asahi Shimbun. The Asahi Shimbun also requested Asahi Broadcasting Corporation to join the NET TV network. After TBS learned of this news, it invited Mainichi Broadcasting to join TBS's network in the summer of 1974, and obtained Mainichi Broadcasting's consent. On November 19, 1974, TBS and Mainichi Broadcasting jointly announced that Mainichi Broadcasting would join JNN starting from April 1, 1975. Compared with the ANN period, MBS's broadcasts are broadcast every week during prime time, the duration of the program broadcast nationwide in Japan was reduced from 5 hours and 50 minutes to 3 hours and 50 minutes. National broadcast programs outside prime time were also reduced from 6 hours and 35 minutes to 4 hours and 55 minutes. At the same time, Mainichi Broadcasting will no longer broadcast Tokyo Channel 12 programs. Mainichi Broadcasting and Asahi Broadcasting also conducted large-scale program exchanges.

In the 1970s, TBS was known as the "hero of private broadcasting" and held a leading position in Japan's private television industry. As a result, MBS's ratings increased after switching networks. From October 1975 to March 1980, the MBS won the triple crown of ratings. High ratings also boosted advertising performance. Mainichi Broadcasting ranked first in prime time ratings for 26 consecutive weeks in the first half of 1978. In the same year, MBS's revenue reached 30.15 billion yen, and the profit reached 5.12 billion yen. The revenue of both the television division and the radio division ranked first among Osaka stations. Beginning in the late 1970s, Mainichi Broadcasting took the lead in introducing electronic news gathering (ENG) among private stations in Osaka, which greatly improved its news gathering and editing capabilities. In 1978, Mainichi Broadcasting opened the Bonn branch, JNN's 11th overseas branch. In 1986, Mainichi Broadcasting opened its second overseas branch, the Manila branch. In terms of technological innovation, Mainichi Broadcasting began broadcasting stereo TV in 1982, and began broadcasting data information in 1986. In 1989, MBS introduced Satellite News Relay (SNG) System.

On November 23, 1978 at 5:00am MBS Radio's frequency was moved again from 1180 kHz to 1179 kHz.

In 1986, Mainichi Broadcasting regained the top position in advertising revenue among Osaka stations. In 1987, Mainichi Broadcasting's turnover reached 53.518 billion yen and profit reached 6.233 billion yen, both setting high records at the time. Relying on the good times of Japan's bubble economy, Mainichi Broadcasting's revenue increased to 64.949 billion yen in 1990, with profits reaching 9.489 billion yen. Taking advantage of the introduction of satellite and cable TV in Japan, Mainichi Broadcasting participated in investing in Japan Satellite Broadcasting in 1983. In 1989, Mainichi Broadcasting joined with Sumitomo Corporation to invest in the establishment of SVN (Space Vision Network) company and began to establish their own satellite TV channels. In 1993, SVN changed its name to GAORA and became a sports-oriented satellite TV channel.

=== Move to Chayamachi ===
In 1990, the new headquarters and studios was completed in Chayamachi, Kita Ward, Osaka for the station's 40th anniversary. MBS moved and merged the headquarters and studio on September 1; the registered headquarters from the Mainichi Shimbun Osaka Head Office, and the broadcasting studio from Senri.

MBS Now aired for the last time on September 29, 2000. It was replaced by Voice on October 2.

On May 15, 2010 MBS began to simulcast its radio broadcasts online within the Kansai region via Radiko together with ABC, OBC, FM 802, FM Osaka, and FM Cocolo.

The construction of the new building that was started in March 2011, located north of its head office, completed on September 4, 2013 named "B Building". The headquarters building was named "M Building". On July 24, 2011, at noon, MBS, along with other television stations in the Kansai region, turned off its analog broadcast, as part of the digital television transition in most prefectures of Japan. On October 1, 2013 the Takaishi Solar Plant was situated in the area of MBS Takaishi Radio Transmitter. On April 4, 2014, the B Building was opened.

=== Restructuring ===
On July 28, 2016, MBS announced that it would restructure as a holding company with the second incarnation of MBS taking over the radio and TV divisions. The restructuring was completed on April 1 of the following year with the company being rebranded to MBS Media Holdings. On April 1, 2021, the radio division was spun-off from Mainichi Broadcasting under the MBS Radio name.
