= 1975 Osaka television affiliation switch =

In 1975, two television stations in Osaka, ABC (TBS/JNN) and MBS (NET/ANN) exchanged affiliations due to issues with the shareholder structures of the two stations, as ABC was affiliated to the Asahi Shimbun and MBS to the Mainichi Shimbun, while the corresponding networks did not (JNN with Mainichi and ANN with Asahi). ABC was the first to show interest in mid-1974; MBS followed in November. Because of the nature of this realignment, the Japanese media industry used the term "volvulus" 腸捻転 (chōnenten).

== Overview ==
The dispute dates back to the establishment of commercial radio in Japan. The Asahi Shimbun planned a commercial radio station with licenses for both Tokyo and Osaka in December 1949; however, in December 1950, the planned company merged with a bid from the Yomiuri Shimbun and Dentsu to form Radio Tokyo. In 1951, the second Asahi Shimbun attempt took place, this time limited to a station in Osaka. There, it faced competition from New Japan Broadcasting, which was funded by the Mainichi Shimbun, which subsequently became MBS.

In 1955, following the introduction of commercial television into Kanto, the first licenses were granted to other cities of Japan. Osaka only received one television station, Osaka Television Broadcasting (OTV); ABC and NJB combined their efforts to manage the station and opted to air television programs from KRT Television and Nippon Television to maximize profits. A new frequency plan was issued by the Ministry of Posts and Telecommunications in 1957 granting more commercial allocations on the VHF band outside of Tokyo, and ABC and MBS were involved. Due to the limited amount of channels on the VHF band, MBS became the only one interested in obtaining a license, while ABC merged with OTV. The launch of Yomiuri Television on 28 August 1958 led to OTV (which would soon become ABC TV) strengthening its affiliation with KRT (which would launch the Japan News Network the following year; while MBS opted for an affiliation agreement with Nippon Educational Television.

== Shareholder issues ==
In 1963, the Asahi Shimbun was dissatisfied at the fact that ABC TV was a JNN affiliate, considering that JNN/TBS had ties with the Mainichi Shimbun. A meeting was held in 1963 proposing a three-point broadcasting policy:

1. that NET TV should be renamed TV Asahi;
2. that ABC TV should switch from TBS/JNN to NET;
3. and that NET/Asahi-affiliated stations should open in Nagoya and Fukuoka.

Subsequently, in 1964, a second meeting took place, where NET released its own three-point consensus:

1. that NET should become a full-service (and not educational) commercial television station;
2. that NET should not depend on other newspapers in its corporate structure;
3. and that NET should improve its operating abilities.

NET and Tokyo 12 Channel were reclassified as general commercial television stations in 1967, three years after the second Asahi Shimbun request. The concept of commercial educational stations ended in 1973.

On 1 January 1970, the All-Nippon News Network (ANN) was created by NET and had six full stations at launch (HTB, NET, CTV, MBS, KSB, KBC; followed on 1 December by a seventh, UHT). However, during the first half of the decade, ANN was the weakest of the four commercial networks. NET, the flagship station, lagged behind TBS in program production. It was not until the mid-1970s when the newspaper-station relationships were eased and, in 1974, Asahi Shimbun announced that it would finally switch ABC's affiliation from JNN to ANN, although ABC executives said that the decision would take more time.

== The switch ==
On 19 November, TBS announced that it would appoint MBS as its Kansai affiliate with effect from the beginning of the next fiscal year (31 March 1975); ABC formally announced its affiliation with JNN on the same day. On 24 March 1975, a full week before the switch, ABC started airing promos for ANN programming in readiness for the change, while a special feature on the Osaka edition of the Asahi Shimbun was published on 30 March, the eve of the switch.

At sign-on time on 31 March, the switch took place. On ABC's side, all ANN programs (with the exception of ABC's programs produced for the Commercial Broadcasting Educational Association), including ANN News, moved to the station, while also introducing new original daily programs, as well as a special program observing the new affiliation. The next day, it aired its first networked program under ANN, Maya the Honey Bee. Both stations exchanged programming at a large scale.

== Effects on programming ==
MBS reduced the amount of weekly primetime programming from five hours and 45 minutes as an ANN affiliate to three hours and 55 minutes at the time of the switch. Moreover, TBS was the "hero of private television" in the 1970s, causing MBS to win the triple crown (primetime, full evening and full day) in ratings from October 1975 until March 1980. ABC, however, did not fare well with its new affiliation at first: under JNN, it was the most profitable commercial television station in Kansai with its profits falling from 1.292 billion yen in 1974 to just 225 million in 1975. Bereft of TBS's high-rated programming, ABC had to improve program production.
