= Osaka Tower =

Former radio and observation tower in Osaka, Japan

Coordinates: 34°42′08.49″N 135°29′09.10″E

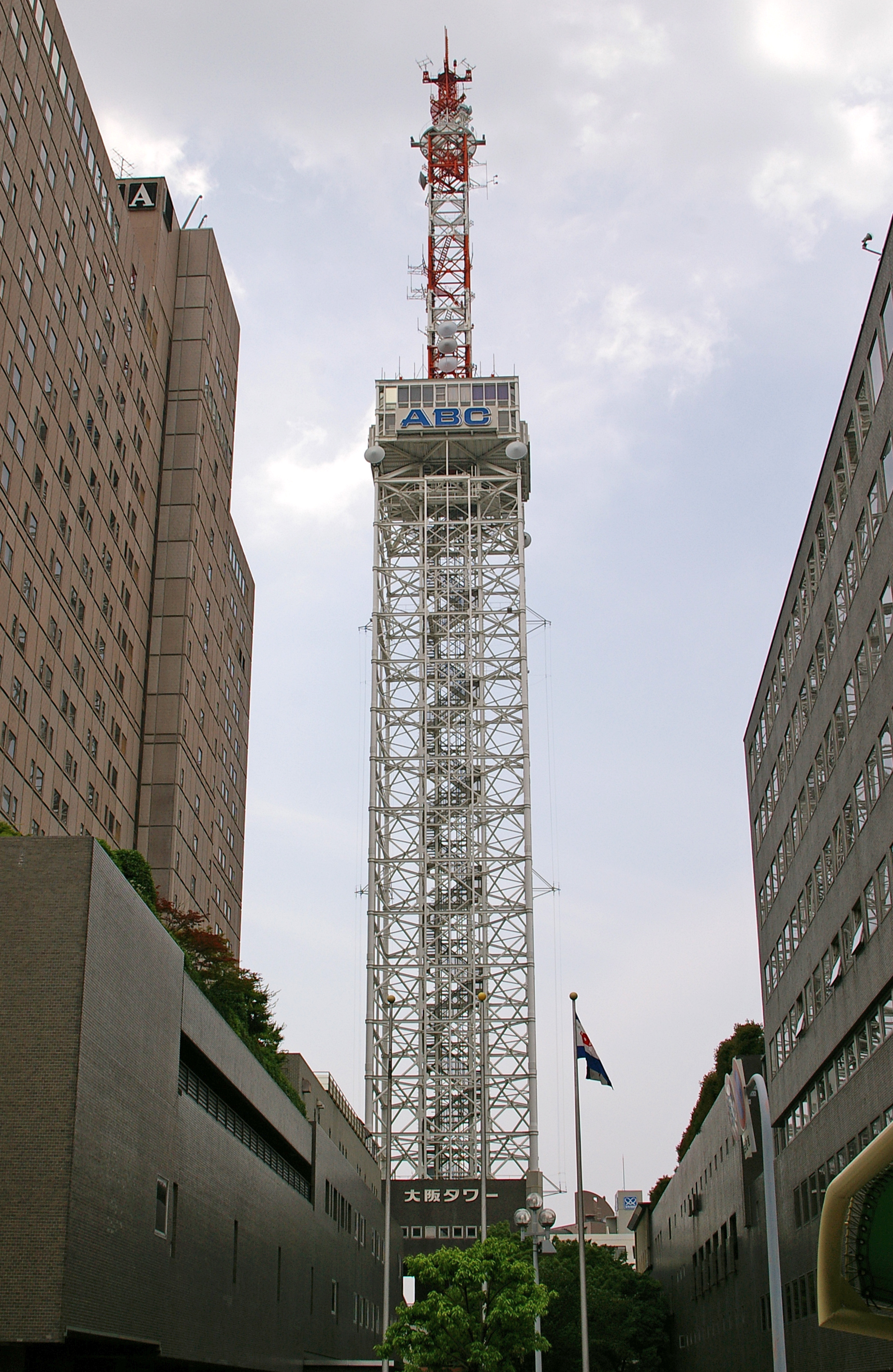
Osaka Tower in Kita-ku, Osaka

Osaka Tower (大阪タワー, Ōsaka Tawā) was an observation and radio tower built beside the headquarters of Asahi Broadcasting Corporation (ABC) in Kita-ku, Osaka, Japan.

== Form ==
The tower was 160 metres (520 ft) high. Built in 1966, it was constructed with metal tubing in a quadratic lattice structure and was designed to handle vibrations and a wind velocity of up to 90 metres per second (300 ft/s). 102 metres (335 ft) up, there was a two-story observation deck. Below this, the tower was painted in white and above it in red and white.

== Function ==
The tower cost 400 million yen and construction was finished in 1966. It had an elevator that could carry 30 persons up to the observation deck, which in turn, could accommodate 270 persons. 4,000 visitors attended the inauguration. In 1979, the "Sky Studio" was installed on the second floor of the observation deck, broadcasting a morning show with weather, traffic conditions, etc. The observation deck was closed to the public in 1997 after heightened security measures due to, among other things, the mail bomb incident of 1994. In 2008, the tower was scheduled to be removed, when the headquarters of ABC moved to Fukushima-ku, Osaka. It was finally demolished in 2009.
