= Gaora =

GAORA

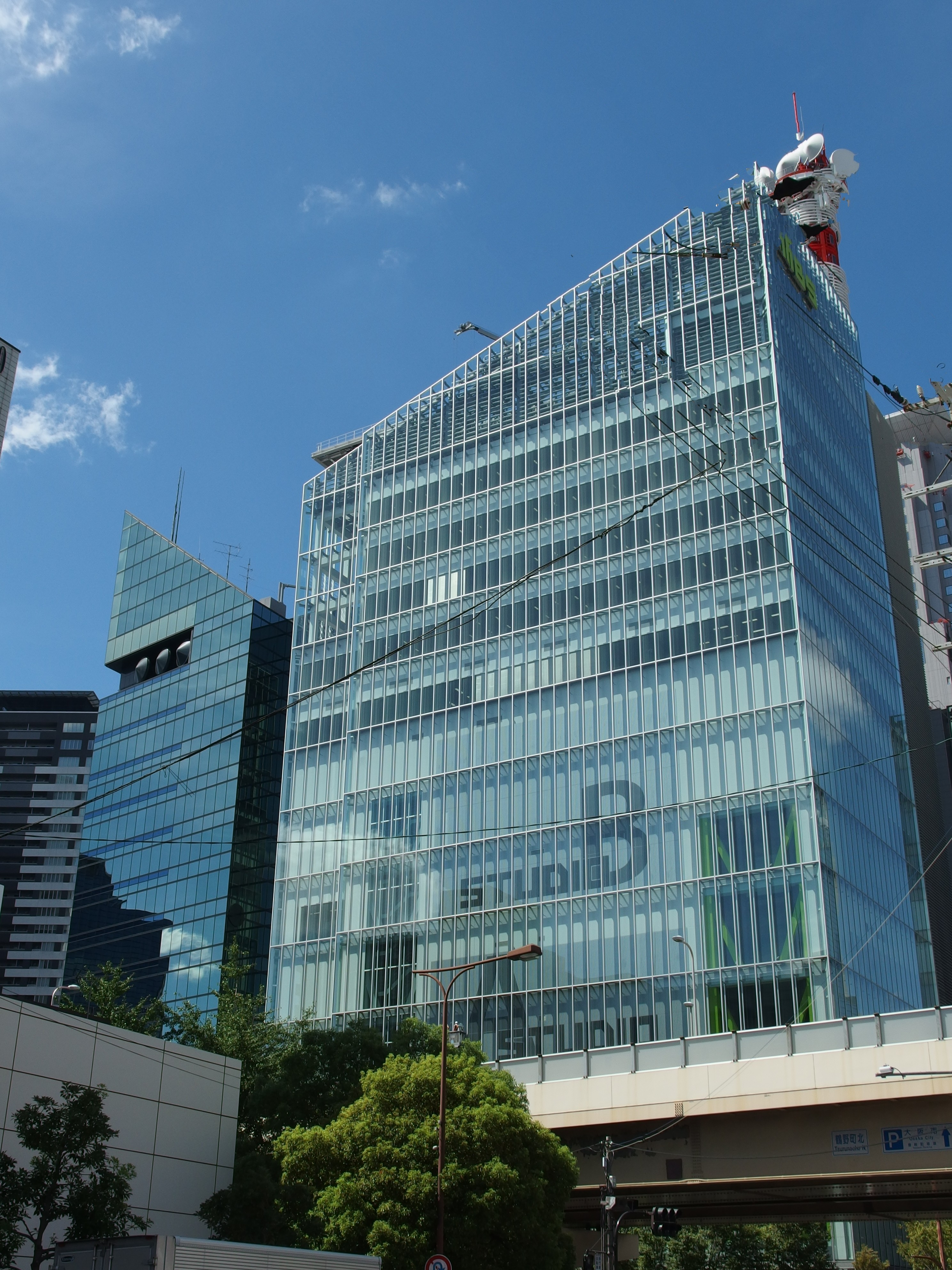
- The "M Building" where Gaora is headquartered
- Type: Pay television network
- Country: Japan
- Headquarters: Osaka, Japan

Programming
- Language: Japanese
- Picture format: 1080p HDTV

Ownership
- Owner: Gaora Incorporated

History
- Launched: December 1, 1989
- Former names: Space Vision Network (1989-1993)

Links
- Website: www.gaora.co.jp

Gaora Incorporated (株式会社GAORA) (stylized as GAORA), also referred to as Gaora Sports and formerly known as the Space Vision Network, is a Japanese satellite sports television network headquartered in Osaka, Japan. It is a subsidiary of MBS Media Holdings which holds a 43.1% stake in the network. The network is carried on satelllite television services Sky PerfecTV! and its premium service and NTT Plala's cable television service Hikari TV. The network was formerly carried on DirecTV until 2000 when the service closed down.

== History ==
In 1989, Mainichi Broadcasting joined Sumitomo Corporation to invest in the establishment of SVN (Space Vision Network) and began to establish their own satellite TV channels. In 1993, SVN changed its name to GAORA and became a sports-oriented satellite TV channel.

On April 1, 2009, Space Vision Network Co., Ltd. changed its name to GAORA Co., Ltd. and on the same day, the network began broadcasting in high-definition starting with Hikari TV and in October, the network began broadcasting in high-definition on Sky PerfecTV!.

On May 1, 2025, GAORA launched the subscription streaming service GAORA On Demand.

== Current programming ==
=== Baseball ===
- National High School Baseball Invitational Tournament
- Nippon Professional Baseball
  - Hokkaido Nippon-Ham Fighters games
  - Hanshin Tigers games

=== American football ===
- Kansai Collegiate American Football League

=== Motorsports ===
- IndyCar
  - NTT IndyCar Series
  - Indy NXT
- NASCAR
  - NASCAR Cup Series (select races since 2023)

=== Combat sports ===
- Krush
- K-1
  - K-1 World Grand Prix
- ZST
- Japan Karate Federation

=== Professional wrestling ===
- All Japan Pro Wrestling
  - Live special events
  - AJPW B-Banquet
- Dragongate
  - Monthly shows
  - Live special events
  - Dragon Gate Infinity
- OZ Academy

=== Golf ===
- Japan Golf Tour
- LPGA of Japan Tour

=== Volleyball ===
- SV.League
- V.League
  - Japan vs. Korea Top Match
- Kurowashiki All Japan Volleyball Tournament
- JBV Grand Slam Mihama Tournament
- Beach Volleyball World Tour

=== Football ===
- Africa Cup of Nations
- DFB Pokal
- Major League Soccer

=== Other sports ===
- B.League
- Red Bull Air Race
- Strongman All Japan Triathlon
- Japan Diamond Softball League

== Former programmming ==
=== Baseball ===
- Pacific League
  - Yakult Swallows vs. Hanshin Tigers games
  - NPB Interleague Play
  - Kintetsu Buffalos games
  - Orix BlueWave games
- Tokyo Big6 Baseball League
- Kansai Big Six Baseball League

=== Professional wrestling ===
- Michinoku Pro Wrestling
- Kaientai Dojo
- Sendai Girls' Pro Wrestling
- Wrestle-1

=== Football ===
- Eredivisie
- J.League

=== Tennis ===
- ATP Tour
  - ATP 500 tournaments
  - ATP Finals
  - Next Gen ATP Finals
- Wimbledon Championships
- Women's Tennis Association
- Japan Open
- Pan Pacific Open
- Japan Tennis Association
