= RKB Mainichi Broadcasting =

Japanese broadcasting station

RKB Mainichi Holdings Corporation

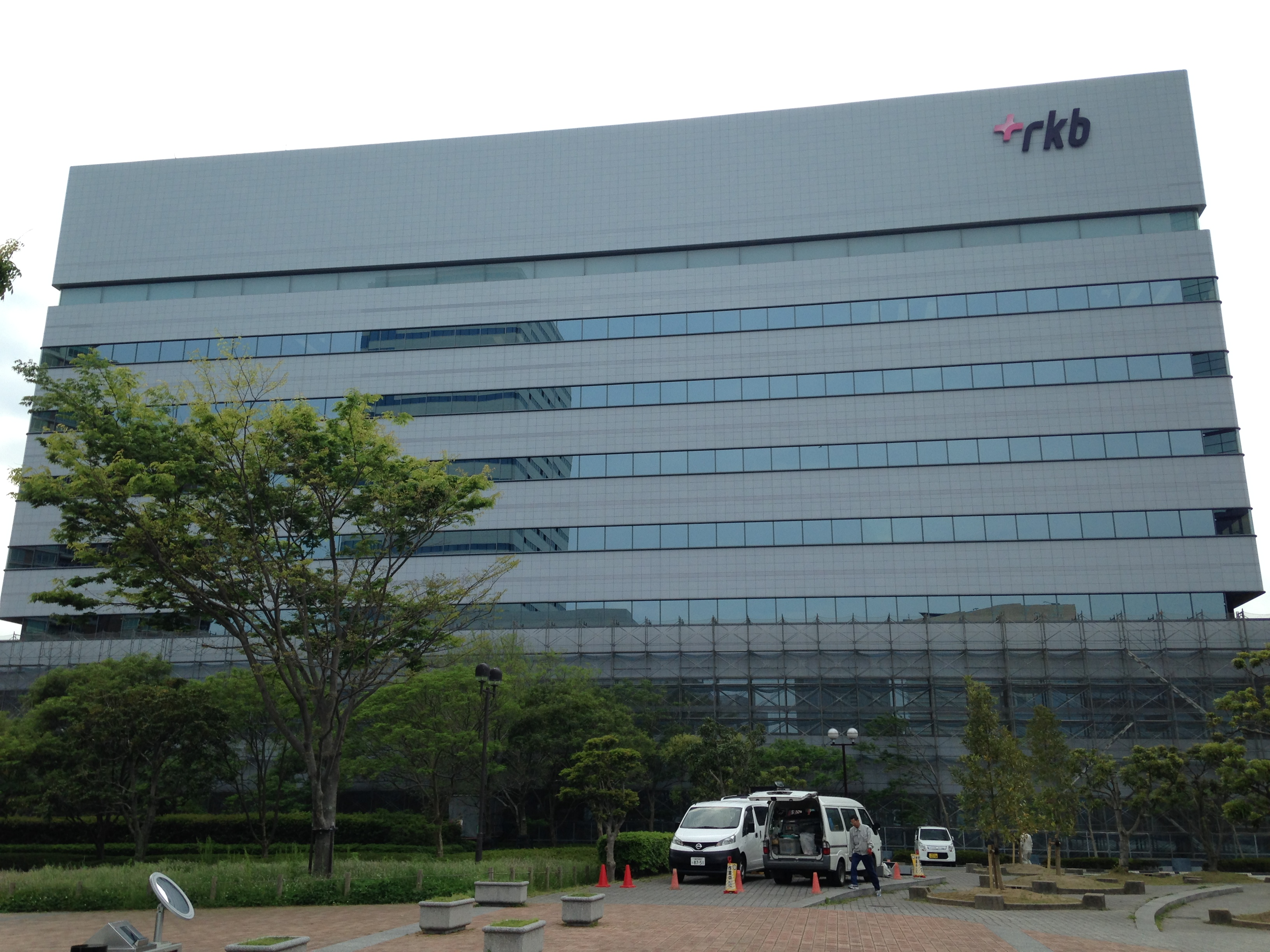
- Trade name: RKB
- Native name: 株式会社RKB毎日ホールディングス
- Romanized name: Kabushikigaisha RKB Mainichi hōrudingusu
- Formerly: Radio Kyushu Co., Ltd. (1951-1958); RKB Mainichi Broadcasting Corporation (1958-2016)
- Company type: Public KK
- Traded as: FSE: 9407
- Industry: Media
- Founded: June 29, 1951 (as Radio Kyushu Broadcasting); August 1, 1958 (as RKB Mainichi Broadcasting)
- Headquarters: 2-3-8 Momochihama, Sawara-ku, Fukuoka City, Fukuoka Prefecture, Japan
- Key people: Ryoji Inoue (President and Representative Director; RKB Mainichi Holdings); Izumi Sato (President and Representative Director; RKB Mainichi Broadcasting)
- Owner: MBS Media Holdings (90.3%); The Mainichi Newspapers (8.63%); TBS Holdings (6.38%)
- Subsidiaries: RKB Mainichi Broadcasting
- Website: rkb.jp/holdings
- Footnotes / references Data from its Corporate Profile

JOFR
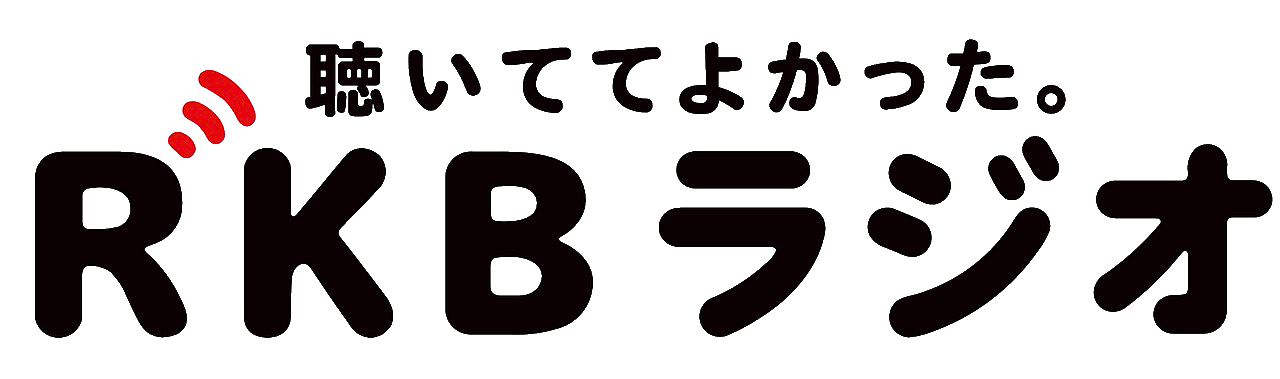
- Fukuoka; Japan
- Broadcast area: Fukuoka Prefecture
- Frequencies: 1278 kHz (AM); 91.0 MHz (FM)
- Branding: RKB Radio

Programming
- Language: Japanese
- Format: Talk/Sports
- Affiliations: Japan Radio Network

Ownership
- Owner: RKB Mainichi Broadcasting Corporation

History
- Call sign meaning: JO Fukuoka Radio or FouR (channel number)

Technical information
- Licensing authority: MIC

Links
- Website: rkb.jp/radio_top/

JOFR-DTV JOFO-TV (defunct)
- Fukuoka Prefecture, Japan; Japan
- City: Fukuoka
- Channels: Digital: 30 (UHF); Virtual: 4
- Branding: RKB Television

Programming
- Affiliations: Japan News Network

Ownership
- Owner: RKB Mainichi Broadcasting Corporation

History
- First air date: March 1, 1958
- Last air date: July 24, 2011 (JOFO-TV)
- Former call signs: JOFR-TV (1958–2011)
- Former channel numbers: 4 (analog VHF, 1958–2011); JOFO-TV: 8 (analog VHF, 1958–2011)
- Former affiliations: NTV/NNN (secondary, 1964-1969)

Technical information
- Licensing authority: MIC
- Transmitter coordinates: 33°35′34.285″N 130°21′3.161″E

Links
- Website: rkb.jp/tv_top/
- Company
- Native name: RKB毎日放送株式会社
- Company type: Subsidiary
- Industry: Radio and television network
- Founded: September 29, 2015 (as RKB Mainichi Division Preparation Corporation)
- Headquarters: Fukuoka, Japan
- Owner: RKB Mainichi Holdings
- Website: rkb.jp

RKB Mainichi Broadcasting Corporation (RKB毎日放送株式会社, RKB Mainichi Hōsō Kabushiki Gaisha) (stylized as ^{+}rkb) is a broadcasting station located in Fukuoka, Japan. It is affiliated with the Japan Radio Network (JRN) and the Japan News Network (JNN). The company is owned by the MBS Media Holdings, Mainichi Shimbun, and the Aso Group.

The initials RKB stand for Radio Kyushu Broadcasting (ラジオ九州放送, Rajio Kyūshū Hōsō), the station's former name.

== History ==
=== Early years ===
RKB Mainichi Broadcasting's 1954 logo, which is in use until 1969 as the primary logo, and used as a secondary logo until 1979.

In 1950, following the enactment of the Radio Law, Mainichi Shimbun sought to establish three radio stations in Tokyo, Osaka, and Fukuoka. Its application for the Tokyo area was later merged with those of other national newspapers and Dentsu, forming Radio Tokyo. In the Osaka area, Mainichi Shimbun applied to establish a station under the name New Japan Broadcasting (later renamed Mainichi Broadcasting), and in Fukuoka Prefecture, under the name Radio Kyushu. A license for JOFR was issued on 21 April 1951, and the company was formally established on 29 June. Radio Kyushu began operations on 1 December of the same year.

Radio Kyushu was one of the first 72 companies in Japan to apply for a license to establish a private radio station. In addition to Mainichi Shimbun, Radio Kyushu received investment from local companies such as Nippon Steel and Kyushu Electric Power. The headquarters was also located in Kyushu Electric Power's building. On 12 April 1951, Radio Kyushu received a preliminary license, and on 7 October of the same year, it began trial broadcasting. On 1 December, Radio Kyushu officially launched, becoming the first private radio station in Kyushu and the fourth private radio station in Japan. In its first month of broadcasting, Radio Kyushu achieved a profit of 500,000 yen. The station’s first-generation trademark was selected through an open competition in 1952. The designer was Hatano Yoshiko, a middle school student in Oita Prefecture. In December 1952, Radio Kyushu established the Ogura broadcasting station, which became Japan's first privately owned radio relay station. In July 1953, Radio Kyushu established a labor union.

=== Jump to television ===
Radio Kyushu received a request for a television license in 1955, becoming preliminary on 22 November 1956. On 22 February 1958, experimental television signals began (JOFR-TV, channel 4). At 11:50am on 1 March, RKB TV began regular service, becoming the sixth commercial TV station in Japan. At the samme time as its launch, another company, Mainichi Seibu Television (西部毎日テレビ) obtained a broadcasting license to cover Kokura and the western side of Yamaguchi, using the JOGX-TV callsign. The two companies merged on 1 August 1958 (when the station in Kitakyushu was set to open) to form RKB Mainichi Broadcasting and the corporate logo changed in October. The station aired programming from KRT TV and Nippon Television in its early months. However, the opening of TV Nishinippon (initially licensed to Kitakyushu) caused the station to withdraw all NTV programs and became a sole KRT TV affiliate, joining its newly-launched Japan News Network in 1959 as a charter affiliate. RKB alongside KRT, HBC, CBC and ABC signed a co-operation agreement (the JNN agreement) in areas such as program production. On 25 December 1960, RKB TV suppressed the daytime breaks and started broadcasting a continuous schedule, running from the morning to late night. In 1964, the company was listed at the Fukuoka Stock Exchange. In the same year, it signed its first international sister station agreement with KTVU from Oakland (which had just become a sister city to Fukuoka), which was an independent station at the time, then in 1967, it signed a new agreement with Busan MBC. On 15 October 1969, RKB opened JNN's Seoul bureau and dispatched reporters there.

=== Color TV ===
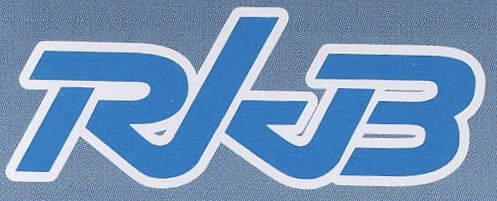
RKB's 2nd logo used for both TV and radio until 2007. It is still seen in a gigantic TV screen outside one of the malls in Fukuoka.

On 3 April 1966, RKB made its first color broadcast, becoming the first TV station west of Osaka in doing so, then on 3 December 1968, it aired its first in-house color production, Living Show (リビングショー). In October 1970, all primetime programming on the station was in color. RKB Mainichi Broadcasting planned to establish Fukuoka Broadcasting in 1961 alongside local companies from Fukuoka, such as Kyushu Electric Power, but it gave up on the plans and FBS eventually became an NTV affiliate (signing on in 1969). Its new logo was unveiled in 1969. To celebrate Fukuoka's twentieth anniversary of designated city status, RKB held the Fukuoka Festival from 29 March to 2 April 1972, attracting over 150,000 attendees. During the 1970s, in an attempt at increasing its sources of revenue beyond advertising, RKB started doing housing showrooms. From 1975, the company implemented a two-day weekend system.

An electronic news gathering system was installed in 1976, improving its news operation. On 30 March 1980, RKB TV started stereo broadcasting, becoming the 22nd commercial TV station in Japan and the second in Fukuoka. Between 1969 and 1979, the station won the Triple Crown in ratings for eleven years in a row. However, in 1980, ratings began to favor KBC more, becoming the new leader by then. After the mid-1980s, TNC was on the rise, creating a three-way competition between the three VHF channels (KBC, RKB and TNC). In fiscal 1983, RKB TV's revenue surpassed ten billion yen. On 23 September 1986, RKB aired an eight-hour special program for its 35th anniversary.

=== New headquarters ===
RKB Mainichi Broadcasting moved to its new premises at Momochihama on 1 July 1996. At the same time, RKB handed over the duties of the Seoul bureau to TBS, meaning that reporters from Tokyo would now cover Korean news to JNN. The network gave RKB the Bangkok bureau. In 2002, RKB was in charge of the Seoul bureau again. In 2005, when an earthquake hit the western side of the prefecture, RKB reported three minutes after the warning and made an extensive service on both radio and television.

RKB began broadcasting a digital signal on 1 May 2006, using the LCN allocation 4 based on its analog channel frequency (JNN usually uses 6, which ended up without usage in the prefecture). That year, it gained a record revenue of 20 billion yen. In June 2007, RKB introduced its new logo, converting the wordmark to lowercase lettering.

The station ended its analog programming at noon on 24 July 2011, the date by which all television stations in Japan were required to discontinue analog broadcasts per federal mandate. Right before shutting off their analog broadcasts at 23:59, RKB aired a video montage showcasing its analog history, with Taro Hakase's "The Cozy Bench" as the background music.

=== Radio ===
During its test period, Radio Kyushu only broadcast news and music programs. The first successful program was Eye on the Mic (マイクの眼), a news program broadcast which started in 1952. Sports broadcasts were also key in its early years. In spring 1952, it aired its first professional baseball game. In 1955, it carried the Manichi Beppu-Oita Marathon in collaboration with Radio Oita. Since that year, RKB Radio has become the most listened-to radio station in Fukuoka and northern Kyushu.

After the start of its television broadcasts, revenue for radio began to decrease. In response, RKB decided to strengthen the mobility of the unit in order to produce programs for more specific groups. RKB joined the Japan Radio Network in 1965. On 1 May 1968, RKB started overnight programming. During the 1970s, long-form news programs became the main pillar of the station. To reduce interference in metropolitan areas, its output increased from 10 kilowatts to 50 in 1972. In 1975, its ratings were of 5,3%. From 17 August 1976, RKB Radio started 24-hour broadcasting. Inspired by MBS Radio, the station started conducting Radio Weeks in 1982, where long programs were produced from several points of the prefecture.

Its revenue surpassed three billion yen for the first time in 1989. In 1997, it held the RKB Radio Festival (RKBラジオまつり) for the first time in order to reach out to the public. On 1 December 2001, for the 50th anniversary, it held a special program lasting for 17 hours and 15 minutes. It joined radiko on 1 December 2011. On 28 March 2016, it started FM broadcasts. As a part of its efforts to become a full-fledged FM station by 2028, RKB Radio suspended its Yukuhashi relay station (1062 kHz) alongside KBC's Yukuhashi relay (1485 kHz) on February 5, 2024. As of this writing, RKB Radio can be listened in Yukuhashi on its Wide FM relay (94.8 MHz), and nearby Kitakyushu AM and FM relays (JOFO, 720 kHz, and Wide FM 91.5 MHz). Currently, the main Fukuoka AM station (JOFR, 1278 kHz), along with the Kitakyushu (JOFO, 720 kHz) and Omuta (JOFE, 1062 kHz) relays are operating, with plans in place to effectively suspend AM operations within or before 2028.
