= Asahi Broadcasting Corporation =

Regional radio and television broadcaster in Japan

Coordinates: 34°41′38.18″N 135°29′18.32″E

Asahi Broadcasting Group Holdings Corporation

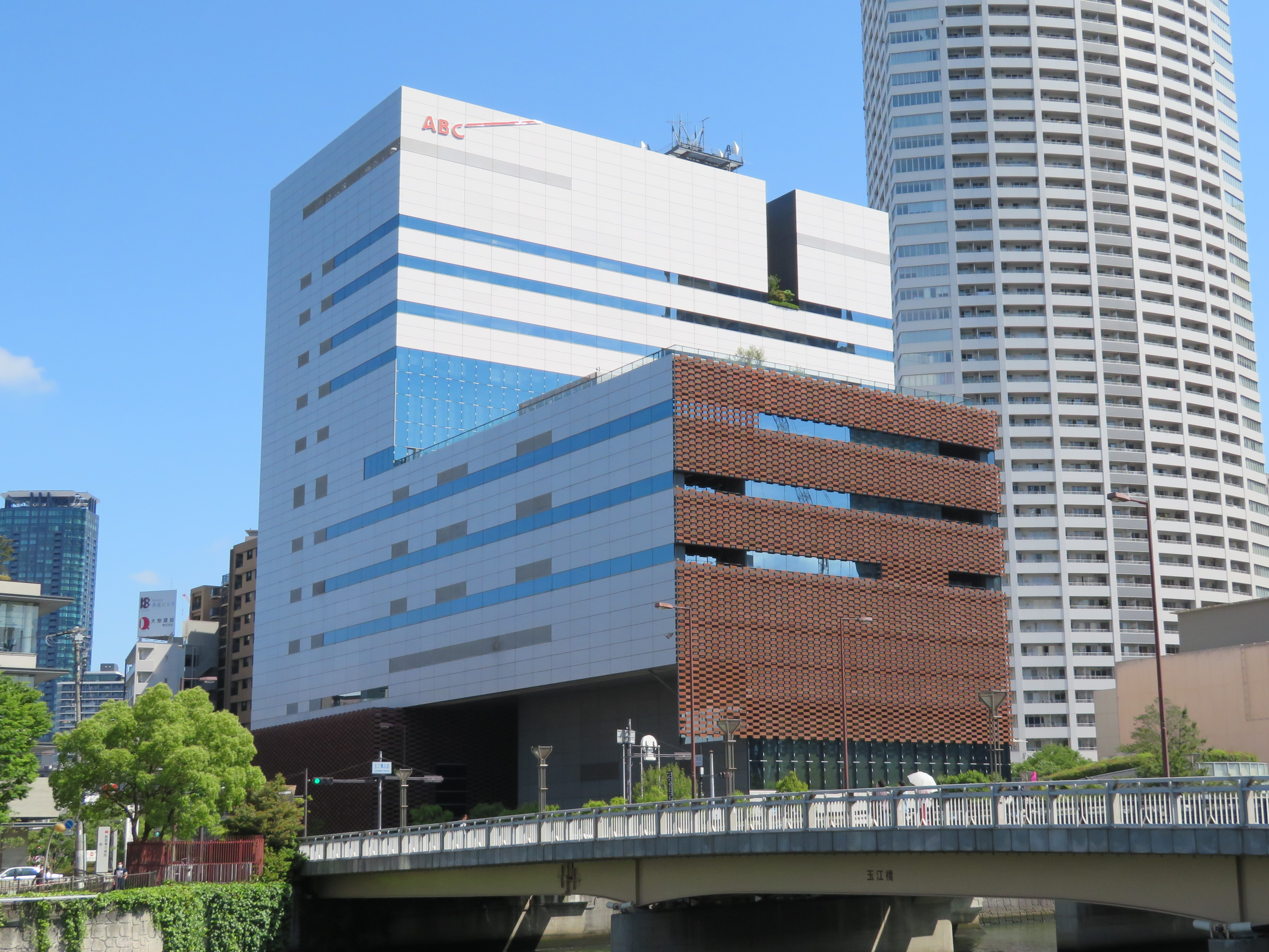
- Native name: 朝日放送グループホールディングス株式会社
- Romanized name: Asahi Hōsō Gurūpu Hōrudingusu kabushiki gaisha
- Formerly: Asahi Broadcasting Company; Asahi Broadcasting Corporation (1951–2018)
- Type: Public KK
- Traded as: TYO: 9405
- Industry: Media
- Founded: 15 December 1949; 76 years ago
- Headquarters: 1-30, Fukushima Itchome, Fukushima-ku, Osaka, Japan
- Number of locations: 5 (3 in Japan, 1 in Paris, 1 in Shanghai)
- Area served: Kansai, Japan
- Key people: Susumu Okinaka (President)
- Services: Television and radio broadcasting
- Revenue: ▲¥78,162 million (2012); ¥76,691 million (2011)
- Operating income: ▲¥4,406 million (2012); ¥3,605 million (2011)
- Net income: ▼¥574 million (2012); ¥2,438 million (2011)
- Total assets: ▲¥94,621 million (2012); ¥93,139 million (2011)
- Total equity: ▲¥56,898 million (2012); ¥56,273 million (2011)
- Owner: The Asahi Shimbun Company (14.88%); TV Asahi Holdings Corporation (9.26%); Murayama family (founding family of The Asahi Shimbun) (7%)
- Number of employees: 670 (March 31, 2011)
- Subsidiaries: Asahi Television Broadcasting Corporation; Asahi Radio Broadcasting Corporation; sky A, Inc.; ABC Development Corporation; i-nex+; ABC Libra; ABC Golf Club; Kagami Co., ltd.; ABC Animation; DLE (51.96%)
- Website: corp.asahi.co.jp
- Footnotes; Data from its Corporate Profile & Group Companies

The Asahi Broadcasting Group Holdings Corporation (朝日放送グループホールディングス株式会社, Asahi Hōsō Gurūpu Hōrudingusu kabushiki gaisha; ABC) is a certified broadcasting holding company headquartered in Osaka, Japan. Until March 31, 2018, it was a unified radio and television broadcaster serving in the Kansai region. On April 1, 2018, its radio and television broadcasting divisions were spun off into two subsidiaries, with Asahi Radio Broadcasting Corporation (Note: 朝日放送ラジオ株式会社, Asahi Hōsō Rajio kabushiki gaisha; ABC Radio) taking over the radio broadcasting business, and Asahi Television Broadcasting Corporation (Note: 朝日放送テレビ株式会社, Asahi Hōsō Terebi kabushiki gaisha; ABC TV) took over television broadcasting.

== History ==
=== Radio ===
In 1948, when The Asahi Shimbun set up a committee for a private radio station in Tokyo, the name ABC was decided upon to be the name of the station. Asahi Broadcasting requested licenses in December 1949 to both Tokyo and Osaka, but in December 1950, the original company merged with Tokyo Broadcasting (Dentsu), Yomiuri Broadcasting and Radio Nippon (funded by Mainichi Shimbun) to create Radio Tokyo (JOKR, KRT, now TBS). In 1951, the ABC plan was revived for a new radio station in Osaka.

The new Asahi Broadcasting Corporation was founded in Nakanoshima, Kita-ku, Osaka on March 15, 1951, with Mitsujirō Ishii appointed as its first president. ABC started AM radio broadcasting on November 11 (1010 kHz). It became the third commercial radio station to sign-on in Japan overall.

On April 1, 1958, the station relocated to the Shin-Asahi Building and in June, started simultaneous broadcasts with KRT Radio, carrying the first commercial radio simulcasts between Tokyo and Osaka. The frequency output doubled from 10 KW to 20 in 1959.

After joining JRN in 1965, ABC relocated to the ABC Center in 1966. Its transmission output was later increased to 50 kW in 1971. In line with changes to the frequency plan set by the International Telecommunication Union (ITU), ABC Radio's frequency shifted from 1010 kHz to 1008 kHz on November 23, 1978. The station officially adopted "ABC Radio" as its commercial name on April 1, 1989. More recently, on March 19, 2016, ABC began broadcasting over the Wide FM band, alongside OBC and MBS.

=== Early years ===
Japan's private TV began with the idea of Masori Matsutaro, the owner of the Yomiuri Shimbun, to use the microwave communication network to build a TV station covering the whole of Japan. In July 1952, Nippon Television in Tokyo obtained a television preparatory license and became Japan's first private television station. At the same time, Sankei Shimbun, Kyoto Broadcasting, Kobe Broadcasting, Yomiuri Shimbun and other companies also intended to set up private TV stations in Osaka Prefecture, and the two private broadcasting stations in Kansai, Asahi Broadcasting and New Japan Broadcasting Company (currently Mainichi Broadcasting System) decided to join forces. In August 1952, Asahi Broadcasting and Nippon Broadcasting revoked their original application for a TV license, and jointly applied for a TV license in the name of Osaka Television Co., Ltd. (大阪テレビ放送株式会社, Ōsaka Terebi Hōsō Kabushiki-gaisha; OTV) (OTV, renamed "Osaka TV Broadcasting" in August of the following year). In the following year, Osaka TV Broadcasting purchased land in Dojimahama-dori, Osaka City, for the construction of the headquarters' building. Osaka TV Broadcasting also selected the trademark through public solicitation in newspapers. On December 3, 1955, Osaka TV Broadcasting obtained the preparatory license; the call sign is JOBX-TV. Before broadcasting, OTV set a goal of 40% self-made programs, and decided to rebroadcast the programs of Tokyo's KRT TV and Nippon TV at the same time to maximize profits. In order to popularize television, OTV also set up 60 street TV sets in various parts of Kansai before the broadcast started. In November 1956, Osaka TV Broadcasting began to conduct trial broadcasts, broadcasting 2.5 hours of programs every day. At 9:30am on December 1, 1956, OTV officially started broadcasting, becoming the first private TV station in Kansai. At the beginning of the broadcast, TV dramas, audience-participating programs, and news programs accounted for nearly half of all programs broadcast on Osaka TV. Osaka TV purchased two taping machines in 1958 and was the first TV station in Japan to introduce video recording facilities. In the same year, Osaka TV also achieved Japan's first live broadcast from the top of Mount Fuji.

In January 1957, the Ministry of Posts and Telecommunications issued a new basic policy for the VHF band in Japan at the same time as OTV, and the metropolitan areas outside Tokyo were allocated more TV channels. There were also 7 operators in Kansai who applied for TV licenses, and Asahi Broadcasting and Mainichi Broadcasting also joined the list of operators applying for TV licenses. However, due to the limited number of channels, the two parties finally agreed to apply for a new station license from Mainichi Broadcasting after the talks between the two parties, while Asahi Broadcasting and Osaka TV Broadcasting merged. At that time, among the employees of TV Broadcasting in Osaka, 200 people wanted to stay in the new company after the merger, and 104 people wanted to join Mainichi Broadcasting. At the same time, because Nippon Television stopped providing programs to Osaka TV after Yomiuri TV started broadcasting in August 1958, Osaka TV and KRT TV established a network relationship. On June 1, 1959, Osaka TV Broadcasting and Asahi Broadcasting merged on an equal basis to become the TV division of Asahi Broadcasting.

=== Post-merger ===
- May 25, 1955 - ABC and New Japan Broadcasting Company (NJB, the predecessor of Mainichi Broadcasting System, Inc.) founded Osaka Television Co., Ltd. (大阪テレビ放送株式会社, Ōsaka Terebi Hōsō Kabushiki-gaisha; OTV) in Dojima, Kita-ku, Osaka. Currently, ANA Crowne Plaza Hotel Osaka is located at the place the head office of OTV used to be.
- December 1, 1956 - OTV started television broadcasting on channel 6, under the callsign JOBX-TV (not to be confused with Oita Asahi Broadcasting which currently uses the JOBX callsign). The station was a primary KRT (TBS) affiliate with a secondary NTV affiliation.
- 1958 - NTV programming was dropped with the launch of Yomiuri Television.
- March 1, 1959 - ABC acquired OTV and renamed the television station ABC Osaka Television (朝日放送大阪テレビ, Asahi Hōsō Ōsaka Terebi; ABC-OTV) and its callsign of TV station was changed (JOBX-TV → JONR-TV).
- June 1, 1959 - ABC merged with OTV, and has been broadcasting both television and radio since then. The head office of OTV was named "ABC Dojima Station" for the use of the TV station.
- May 2, 1965 - ABC joined Japan Radio Network (JRN), and the next day it also joined another commercial radio network National Radio Network (NRN).
- 1966 - Dispersed offices and studios were integrated into the headquarters building in Oyodo-minami, Oyodo-ku (present: Kita-ku), Osaka.
- March 31, 1975 - ABC pulled out of JNN and joined All-Nippon News Network (ANN) on behalf of Asahi Shimbun, one of major shareholders of ABC. ABC was one of founders of Japan News Network (JNN), the first news network of commercial television stations in Japan.
- November 23, 1978 - The frequency of ABC AM radio changed from 1010 kHz to 1008 kHz.
- March 23, 2001 - ABC acquired ISO 14001 certification, the first broadcaster in Japan to do so. At the same time, the current advertising slogan of the station, Info Designing ABC, was also launched.
- January 1, 2008 - The ABC logo was redesigned, featuring the call letters ABC and the name "Asahi Broadcasting Corporation", "朝日放送", "Radio", or "TV" under the slope line from the letter "C". A simplified version (only three letters of "ABC") is used in program credits.
- May 19, 2008 - ABC moved the headquarters from Oyodo-minami Nichome, Kita-ku to Fukushima Itchome, Fukushima-ku, Osaka.
- June 23, 2008 - ABC started broadcasting from its present headquarters.
- July 24, 2011 - Analog television operations ended on ABC at noon, in line with stations in most prefectures across Japan. The station now broadcasts in digital only.
- April 1, 2018 - ABC became a certified broadcasting holding company and renamed Asahi Broadcasting Group Holdings Corporation. Asahi Radio Broadcasting Corporation took over radio broadcasting business, and Asahi Television Broadcasting Corporation took over TV broadcasting business, employees, and administrator for ABC website.

== Network affiliations ==
=== Radio ===
JONR
- Osaka; Japan
- Broadcast area: Kansai region
- Frequencies: 1008 kHz; 93.3 MHz
- Branding: ABC Radio 1008 (ABCラジオ1008, ABC Rajio ichi maru maru hachi)

Programming
- Language: Japanese
- Format: Talk, Sports
- Affiliations: JRN; NRN

Ownership
- Owner: Asahi Radio Broadcasting Corporation

History
- First air date: November 11, 1951; 74 years ago
- Former frequencies: 1951-1978: 1010 kHz

Technical information
- Licensing authority: MIC
- Power: 50 kW

Links
- Webcast: radiko
- Website: abc1008.com

- Japan Radio Network (JRN)
- National Radio Network (NRN)

=== TV ===
JOAY-DTV
- Kansai region; Japan
- City: Osaka
- Channels: Digital: 15 (UHF); Virtual: 6
- Branding: ABC TV

Programming
- Affiliations: All-Nippon News Network

Ownership
- Owner: Asahi Television Broadcasting Corporation

History
- Founded: May 23, 1955; 71 years ago
- First air date: December 1, 1956; 69 years ago
- Former call signs: JOBX-TV (1956-1959); JONR-TV (1959-2011); JONR-DTV (2003-2018)
- Former channel numbers: Analog: 6 (VHF, 1956-2011)
- Former affiliations: TBS/JNN (December 1, 1956–March 31, 1975)

Technical information
- Licensing authority: MIC
- ERP: 23 kW

Links
- Website: asahi.jp

- Japan News Network (JNN) (until March 30, 1975)
- All-Nippon News Network (ANN) (since March 31, 1975)

== Broadcasting ==
=== Radio ===
JONR

- Osaka::1008 kHz, 50 kW; 93.3 MHz FM
- Kyoto:1008 kHz, 300 W
- Total:50.3 kW
- Time: from 4:30 a.m. on Monday until 2:30 a.m. on Monday (24-hour operation)
- Time signal: 523.251 Hz (C5)

=== TV (Analog) ===
JONR-TV (former callsign: JOBX-TV)
- Channel 6 (closed on July 24, 2011)

=== TV (Digital) ===
JOAY-DTV (former callsign: JONR-DTV)
- Channel 15 (Remote controller button: 6)

== Offices ==
- Headquarters: 1-30, Fukushima Itchome, Fukushima-ku, Osaka-shi, Japan (Hotarumachi)
- Tokyo Office: 10th floor of Nippon Life Hamamatsucho Crea Tower, 2–31, Hamamatsucho Nichome, Minato-ku, Tokyo, Japan
- Nagoya Office: 9th floor of Ricco Sakae, 14–7, Sakae Sanchome, Naka-ku, Nagoya-shi, Japan
- Kobe Office: Kobe Asahi Building, 60 Nakaniwamachi, Chuō-ku, Kobe-shi, Japan
- Kyoto Office: Kyoto Asahi Building, 65 Yanagihachimanchō, Nakagyō-ku, Kyoto-shi, Japan
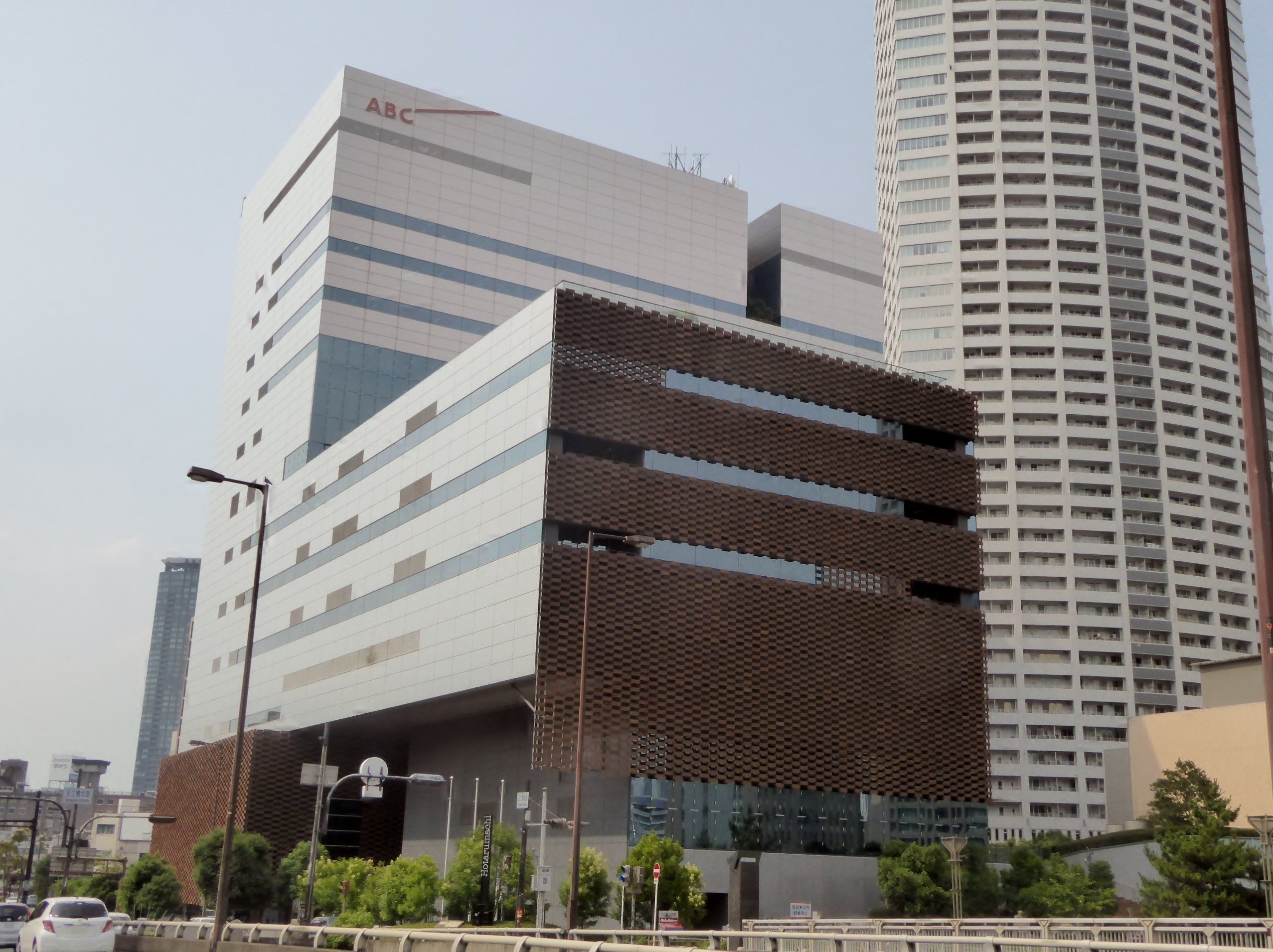
Current headquarters of Asahi Broadcasting Corporation

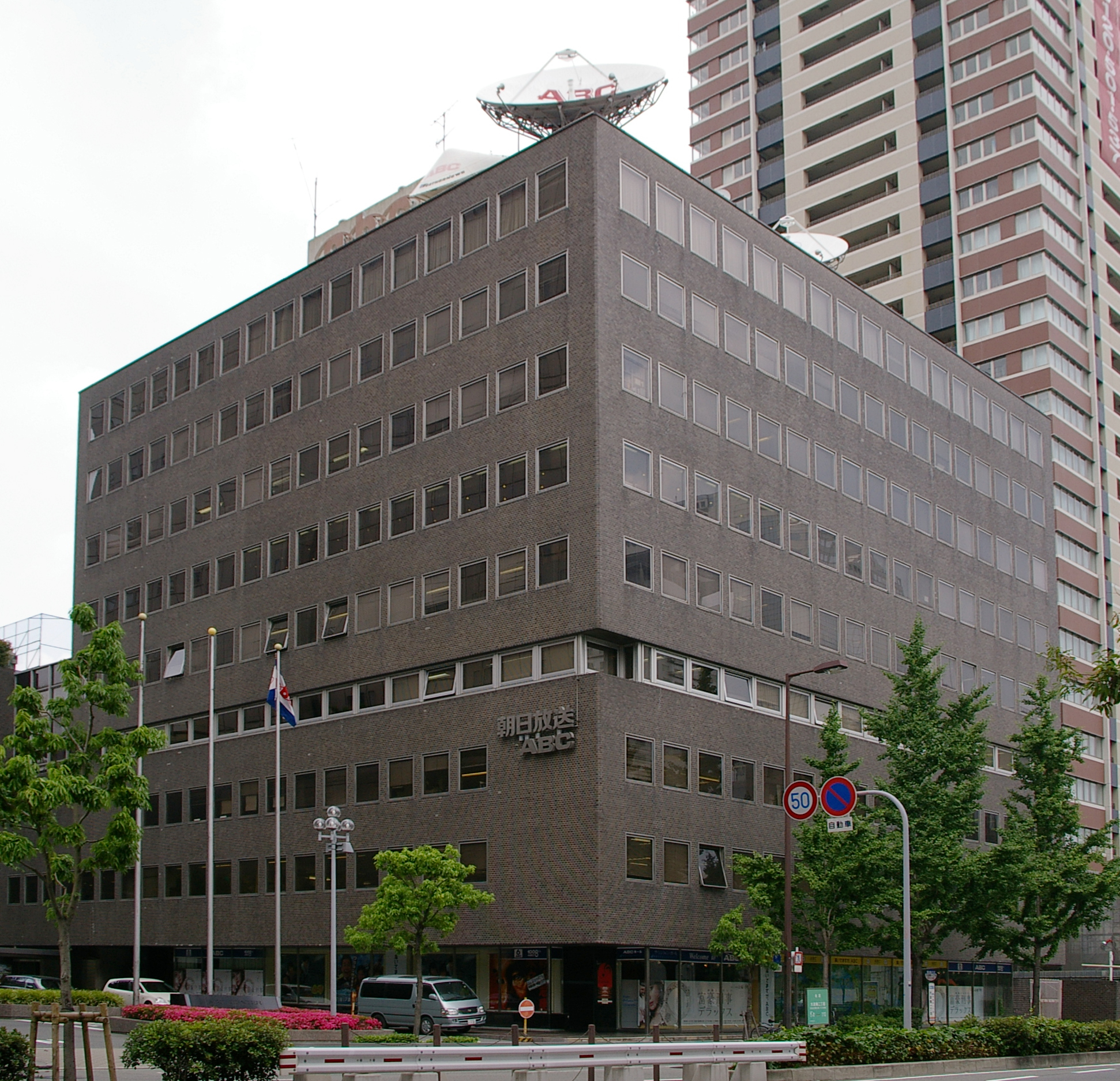
Former headquarters of Asahi Broadcasting Corporation

== Programming ==
=== Current programming ===
- Pretty Cure series (both with TV Asahi, onwards)

=== Former Programming ===
- Saint Tail
- Marmalade Boy

== See also ==
- Television in Japan
- Osaka Tower
