= Death Note 2: The Last Name =

2006 film by Shūsuke Kaneko

- Theatrical release poster
- Directed by: Shūsuke Kaneko
- Screenplay by: Tetsuya Oishi; Shūsuke Kaneko
- Based on: Death Note by: Tsugumi Ohba; Takeshi Obata
- Produced by: Toyoharu Fukuda; Seiji Okuda; Takahiro Satō
- Starring: Tatsuya Fujiwara; Kenichi Matsuyama; Erika Toda; Shunji Fujimura; Takeshi Kaga; Nana Katase; Shidou Nakamura; Shinnosuke Ikehata
- Cinematography: Kenji Takama
- Edited by: Yosuke Yafune
- Music by: Kenji Kawai
- Production companies: Chūkyō Television Broadcasting; Fukuoka Broadcasting Corporation; Horipro; Hiroshima Telecasting; Konami Digital Entertainment; Miyagi Television Broadcasting; Nikkatsu; Nippon TV; Shochiku; Shueisha; Sapporo Television Broadcasting; VAP; Warner Bros. Pictures; Yomiuri Telecasting Corporation
- Distributed by: Warner Bros. Pictures
- Release dates: October 16, 2006 (Pusan International Film Festival); November 3, 2006 (Japan); April 22, 2007 (United States)
- Running time: 139 minutes
- Countries: Japan; United States
- Language: Japanese
- Box office: ¥5.5 billion (Japan) $54 million (worldwide)

Death Note 2: The Last Name (デスノート the Last name, Desu Nōto Za Rasuto Neimu) is a 2006 supernatural thriller film directed by Shūsuke Kaneko. The film is the second in a series of live-action Japanese films released in 2006 based on the Death Note manga and anime series by Tsugumi Ohba and Takeshi Obata. The film primarily centers on a university student named: Light Yagami, who decides to rid the world of the crime element with the help of an otherworldly notebook that kills anyone whose name is written in it, under the alias of a controversial serial-killer/vigilante: "Kira", while evading capture from a Tokyo police task-force, led by an enigmatic and highly-intelligent criminal profiler: "L", who is determined to find and apprehend Light. The film was produced by Nippon Television, and distributed by Warner Bros. Pictures Japan. It was licensed by VIZ Pictures. A spin-off, L: Change the World, was released in 2008. A sequel, Death Note: Light Up the New World, was released in 2016.

On Friday, September 21, 2018, at Anime Weekend Atlanta, FUNimation Entertainment announced that they would license Death Note, Death Note 2: The Last Name, and Death Note: Light Up the NEW World, and said that they would be released on January 22, 2019, on subtitle-only Blu-ray, DVD, and digital combo packs.

== Plot ==
Misa Amane receives a Death Note from Rem, another Shinigami. As Light Yagami joins the task force after the funeral of Shiori, Light's girlfriend (Light had caused Shiori's death in the previous movie), Misa becomes the Second Kira and forces a TV station to broadcast her taped messages. Misa, using her Shinigami Eyes, looks through the TV screen and kills a critic of Kira, as well as Detective Mogi and two policemen, who were trying to disperse a rally of Kira's supporters. Light's younger sister Sayu is almost killed, but Soichiro crashes into the festival wearing a motorcycle helmet, which prevents Misa from seeing his face. Light arrives to comfort Sayu and Soichiro, but is spotted by Misa, who correctly identifies Light as Kira. Misa approaches Light near his home, requesting to be his girlfriend and to join his mission to cleanse the world. Seeing that she has Shinigami Eyes, Light accepts her help, and sets up a meeting between her and L, in the hope of learning L's true name. However, Misa is arrested by L because of evidence connecting her to the taped messages. Fearing that Misa will confess, Light arranges for himself and Misa to forfeit their Death Notes, thereby losing their memory. Light buries his Death Note, while Rem gives the other Death Note to Kiyomi Takada, a reporter covering the Kira case. His plan is to sit in jail while Kira's killings are continued by Takada, thereby convincing the police of his innocence.

After some time, Light and Misa are released, but kept under surveillance by L. Light finds a clue leading to Takada, and assists the police-team in arresting her. As a result, the police learns of the existence of Death Notes and Shinigami. By touching the Death Note, Light regains his memories, and he proceeds to kill Takada using a fragment of a Death Note hidden inside his watch. Earlier, Light had written a fake rule into the Death Note stating that, once a person writes a name, he must keep writing names every thirteen days or perish. The police, believing this rule to be real, consider Light and Misa as being completely exonerated, as they were in custody for much longer than thirteen days.

Light asks Misa to uncover the buried Death Note to kill L. Misa, having forgotten L's name, resumes Kira's killing spree instead. L decides to send the task force, bar himself and Light, to America to test the authenticity of the 13 day rule. With suspicion falling upon Misa, Rem is forced to kill Watari and L to protect Misa from being arrested again. Since Shinigami are not allowed to protect humans, the action results in Rem's death. For the sake of halting the police-investigation into Kira, Light proceeds to write his own father's name into his Death Note, much to Misa's horror. Strangely, his father doesn't die, and Light is surrounded by the police at gunpoint. L also emerges, revealing that he wrote his own name into the Death Note, scheduling his death a month in advance and becoming immune to further writings in the Death Note. He also reveals that the Death Note Light wrote on was a decoy and that the task force did not leave for America but were surveilling Light from another location, thereby witnessing him reveal his true colors as Kira. Light, being cornered, pleads with Ryuk to kill the people surrounding him, but Ryuk decides to kill Light instead. He reveals to Light that any human who owns a Death Note is banned from Heaven and Hell, and will instead spend eternity as nothingness. Light dies in his father's arms, begging his father to believe that his actions were for the sake of justice. The police decided to cover up the truth, and to announce that Kira killed Light and then himself. Twenty days later, Soichiro meets L one last time before L peacefully dies. One year later, on Light's birthday, Soichiro maintains the false story to his wife and Sayu, that Kira killed Light. Misa also celebrates Light's birthday, loving him but having no recollection of the Death Note. The film ends with Ryuk flying around the Tokyo Tower and laughing.

== Cast ==
- Tatsuya Fujiwara as Light Yagami
- Kenichi Matsuyama as L
- Erika Toda as Misa Amane
- Shidou Nakamura as Ryuuk
- Shinnosuke Ikehata as Rem
- Nana Katase as Kiyomi Takada
- Shunji Fujimura as Watari
- Takeshi Kaga as Souichirou Yagami
- Hikari Mitsushima as Sayu Yagami
- Shin Shimizu as Kanzou Mogi
- Michiko Godai as Sachiko Yagami
- Tatsuhito Okuda as Shuuichi Aizawa
- Sota Aoyama as Touta Matsuda
- Miyuki Komatsu as Sanami
- Ikuji Nakamura as Hirokazu Ukita
- Masanori Fujita as Ryotarou Sakajo
- Ai Maeda as Ayako Yoshino
- Magy as Yuuji Demegawa
- Masahiko Tsugawa as Saeki

=== English Dubbed Cast ===
- Brad Swaile as Light Yagami
- Alessandro Juliani as L
- Shannon Chan-Kent as Misa Amane
- Brian Drummond as Ryuuk
- Michael Dobson as Rem
- Heather Doerksen as Kiyomi Takada
- Ron Halder as Watari
- Christopher Britton as Souichirou Yagami
- Kristie Marsden as Sayu Yagami
- John Murphy as Kanzou Mogi
- Saffron Henderson as Sachiko Yagami
- Trevor Devall as Shuuichi Aizawa
- Vincent Tong as Touta Matsuda
- Janyse Jaud as Sanami
- Jeremy From as Hirokazu Ukita
- Michael Donovan as Ryotarou Sakajo

== Songs ==
- "Dani California" by Red Hot Chili Peppers
- "Snow ((Hey Oh))" by Red Hot Chili Peppers (Closing)

== Release ==
The film was released in Hong Kong on November 3, 2006, in Taiwan on November 24, 2006, in Singapore on December 28, 2006, and in Malaysia on January 25, 2007, with English and Chinese subtitles. It was dubbed into English and released in American theaters for two nights only, October 15 and 16, 2008. The film was released in Canada on December 3.

=== Home media ===
The DVD was released on February 10, 2009, with English dubbed.

== Reception ==
=== Box office ===
The film premiered on November 3, 2006, and instantly topped the Japanese box office, remaining at number one for four straight weeks. It grossed ¥5.5 billion ($47.3 million) in Japan by the end of the year, making it one of the year's top four highest-grossing Japanese films. The film also grossed $6,748,675 overseas, for a worldwide total of $54,048,675.

=== Critical response ===
The film received a mostly positive reception from critics and fans. On Rotten Tomatoes, the film received an 80% approval rating based on 5 reviews, with an average rating of 5.6/10.

Praise was aimed at the darker yet familiar tone, finely-toned pacing, well-plotted storyline, performances of the cast, and the satisfying ending, while some criticism was aimed at the perceived lack of faithfulness to the source material towards the film's second half, along with the unrefined pacing by the film's second half, with some disliking the ending. Christy Lee S.W. of The Star, in her review of the film, stated that Kaneko "did a good job" in pacing the film, adding that the increased pacing towards the end made some of the content difficult to understand. She also said that screenwriter Tetsuya Oishi made sure the characters were "well fleshed out" and easily empathized with.

== Accolades ==
Award nominations for Death Note 2: The Last Name
Year	Award	Category	Recipient	Result
2007	Asian Film Awards	Best Screenwriter	Tetsuya Oishi Shūsuke Kaneko	Won
2007	Yokohama Film Festival	Best New Talent	Kenichi Matsuyama	Won

== Sequel ==
A sequel, Death Note: Light Up the New World, was released in Japan on October 29, 2016. A three-part miniseries entitled Death Note: New Generation was aired as a part of the Death Note live-action film series. It bridges the 10-year gap between the previous films and the 2016 film.
