= L: Change the World =

- Film poster advertising this film in Japan
- Directed by: Hideo Nakata
- Written by: Tsugumi Ohba; Takeshi Obata; Hirotoshi Kobayashi
- Based on: Death Note by: Tsugumi Ohba; Takeshi Obata
- Produced by: Seiji Okuda; Nobuhiro Iizuka; Takahiro Kobashi; Takahiro Sato; Tadashi Tanaka
- Starring: Kenichi Matsuyama; Mayuko Fukuda; Narushi Fukuda; Shingo Tsurumi; Youki Kudou; Sei Hiraizumi; Bokuzou Masana
- Cinematography: Tokusho Kikumura
- Edited by: Nobuyuki Takahashi
- Music by: Kenji Kawai
- Production companies: Nippon TV; Sapporo Television Broadcasting; Miyagi Television Broadcasting; Shizuoka Daiichi Television; Chūkyō Television Broadcasting; Hiroshima Telecasting; Fukuoka Broadcasting Corporation; Shueisha; Horipro; Yomiuri Telecasting Corporation; VAP; Shochiku; Nikkatsu
- Distributed by: Warner Bros. Pictures Japan
- Release date: 9 February 2008
- Running time: 129 minutes
- Country: Japan
- Languages: Japanese; English; Thai; Italian; French
- Box office: $35.99 million

L: Change the World (stylized as L: change the WorLd) is a 2008 Japanese thriller film and a spin-off to the Death Note film series. Although the film is inspired by the manga Death Note that was written by Tsugumi Ohba and illustrated by Takeshi Obata, it follows an original storyline. It is set during the events of Death Note 2: The Last Name.

The film is directed by Hideo Nakata, and it stars actor Kenichi Matsuyama as the character L Lawliet. Furthermore, child actor Narushi Fukuda stars as Near, while child actress Mayuko Fukuda plays the role of Maki Nikaido, a character who does not appear in the original manga.

The film was first released in Hong Kong by Panasia Films on 7 February 2008. It was subsequently released in the Japanese box office on 9 February 2008. Additionally, two different versions of the film were shown in the United States on 29 and 30 April 2009 respectively.

== Plot ==
In the final 23 days of L's life, he takes on one final case involving a bioterrorist group that aims to wipe out much of humanity with a virus. The virus has an infection rate that is one hundred times the infection rate of the Ebola virus. During this case, he takes a young boy with a gift for calculations, the sole survivor of the virus's use in a village in Thailand, and an elementary school student named Maki Nikaido under his wing.

Dr. Nikaido later receives a sample of the deadly virus which destroyed that village in Thailand. His assistant, Dr. Kimiko Kujo, reveals herself to be the leader of the organization that created the virus. Dr. Nikaido, who has created an antidote to that virus, refuses to give it to her. He destroys the antidote and injects himself with the virus. She later kills him, and she is convinced that his daughter Maki has the antidote formula.

Under the pursuit of Dr. Kimiko Kujo and her assistants, Maki runs and escapes. She eventually finds L's headquarters. However, the group manages to track Maki down, forcing L, accompanied by Maki and the boy, to run away in a high-tech crepe truck; Maki had also injected herself with the virus beforehand and tried to use her infection to murder Kujo out of hatred for her father's homicidal death, but there were no signs of infection throughout the journey of the trio's escape. The trio also received the help of FBI agent Hideaki Suruga during the escape.

They escape to Nikaido's research partner Dr Matsudo's lab because they need his help to recreate the antidote. Initially reluctant, Matsudo agreed after sensing L's determination and after running some tests, he found that the reason Maki did not show signs of infection was because of her low blood sugar, and the virus was unable to infect her rapidly enough since it depends on sugar to do so. When they did not seem to get to any closer to achieving a positive outcome for a cure, the boy had solved a mathematical puzzle left behind by Maki's father, which turned out to be a crucial hint to making the antidote. Using this hint, and upon hearing from L that the boy was the sole survivor of the Thai village which the virus destroyed in the start of the film (he was possibly immune), Matsudo decided to try using some of the boy's blood for a test to create the antidote. During the tests to create the antidote, Maki was kidnapped by Kujo and her accomplices when she sneaked off and attempted to murder Kujo to avenge her father.

With the help of the boy, L manages to acquire the antidote just as the terrorists are about to take Maki, who started to show signs of infection, to the US to spread the virus. L stops the plane and gives all the infected passengers, including the surviving terrorists, the antidote. Maki then tries to kill Kujo out of revenge, but L stops her, telling her that killing Kujo would not bring back her father. Kujo and the terrorists are then arrested. Maki wakes up in a hospital, fully cured, with her stuffed bear next to her and a recording from L telling her to have a good day tomorrow. The film concludes with L leaving the young boy in the care of Wammy's House, the orphanage where he grew up. Before leaving, L christens the until-then-unnamed boy "Near."

After the end credits, L is seen back in his room eating a chocolate bar and leaving momentarily. The film ends with the words "L Lawliet, Rest in Peace" on a black screen.

== Cast ==
- Kenichi Matsuyama as L
- Narushi Fukuda as The Boy/ Near
- Mayuko Fukudo as Maki Nikaido
- Shingo Tsurumi as Kimihiko Nikaido
- Youki Kudou as Kimiko Kujo/ K
- Sei Hiraizumi as Kouichi Matsudo
- Bokuzou Masana as Asao Konishi
- Yuuta Kanai as Tamotsu Yoshizawa
- Megumi Satou as Hotsune Misawa
- Renji Ishibashi as Shin Kagami
- Kiyotaka Nanbara as Hideaki Suruga
- Masanobu Takashima as Daisuke Matoba
- Shunji Fujimura as Watari
- Kazuki Namioka as F
- Hao Ganhane as Azetsu Mokotu
- Erika Toda as Misa Amane
- Shidou Nakamura as Ryuk
- Asaka Seto as Naomi Misora
- Shigeki Hosokawa as Raye Iwamatsu
- Youji Tanaka as Sasaki
- Tatsuya Fujiwara as Light Yagami
- Ayui Naisora as Yagure Mokotu

=== English Dubbed Cast ===
- Alessandro Juliani as L
- Michael Strusievici as The Boy/ Near
- Chantal Strand as Maki Nikaido
- Ted Cole as Kimihiko Nikaido
- Cathy Weseluck as Kimiko Kujo/ K
- Michael Dobson as Kouichi Matsudo
- Mark Oliver as Asao Konishi
- Kirby Morrow as Tamotsu Yoshizawa
- Tabitha St. Germain as Hotsune Misawa
- John Novak as Shin Kagami
- Brian Dobson as Hideaki Suruga
- John Murphy as Daisuke Matoba
- Ron Halder as Watari
- Richard Ian Cox as F
- Shannon Chan-Kent as Misa Amane
- Brian Drummond as Ryuk
- Nicole Oliver as Naomi Misora
- Bill Switzer as Sasaki
- Megan Hollingshead as Yagure Mokotu
- Michael Adamthwaite as Raye Iwamatsu

== Production ==
The spin-off of the film series Death Note was announced on 29 May 2007. It was announced that the shooting of this film took place in the summer of 2007. A trailer was also posted to the film's official website.

Director Hideo Nakata told The Daily Yomiuri that he wanted to reveal L's "human side," which had not been explored in the Death Note series.

The theme song of the film is "I'll Be Waiting" by Lenny Kravitz.

== Release ==
L: Change the World was first released in the Japanese box office on 9 February 2008. It was screened on 398 cinema screens throughout Japan on its opening day. On the same day, this film was also released in Taiwan, Korea, Hong Kong and Thailand. It was subsequently released in Singapore on 21 February 2008, and in the United Kingdom on 29 December 2008.

L: Change the World had a limited two-day screening in the United States. Two versions, a subtitled version with Japanese audio and an English-dubbed version, were shown on 29 and 30 April 2009 respectively. The latter version had the same voice actors doing the voice-over as the other English-dubbed versions of Death Note. This film was released in the US by publisher Viz Media.

The film was released on DVD in the United States on 18 August 2009.

== Reception ==
=== Box office ===
L: Change the World was the highest-grossing film at the Japanese box office during its debut weekend. It grossed a total of ¥846 million and had 677,000 admissions during the first three days. It also set the record for the highest grossing and most watched film over a two-day period. As of 5 March 2008, a total of 2,200,000 people went to watch the film, and the film grossed a total of around ¥2.5 billion.

L: Change the World is the tenth highest-grossing film of 2008 in Japan. According to the Motion Picture Producers Association of Japan, this film earned a total of ¥3.1 billion ($29.99 million) at the Japanese box office in the year 2008. Overseas, the film grossed $6,003,340, bringing its worldwide total to $35,993,340.

=== Critical reception ===
Rodney Perkins from Twitch criticized the film, saying that "it was somewhat difficult to see the appeal of L: Change the World to anyone beyond young people, and hardcore fans of the original films and the manga upon which it is based.". He also added that L's "idiosyncrasies seem more distracting than anything else", although he concedes that "they are completely true to the character". The reviewer ended by questioning "whether this enthusiasm [of the viewers] arises from the film itself, as opposed to its relationship to the broader Death Note phenomenon.".

The reviewer for Love HK Films, Kozo, described L: Change the World as a "fan service for fans", and added that the film "is neither groundbreaking nor noteworthy". He said that although "rabid fans of the blockbuster manga adaptations will probably find this to be a suitable reward for their unabated fandom", the "uninitiated may need to take a crash course in Death Note lore". However, he did praise the film's development of L's character.

== Merchandise ==
=== TV spinoff ===
A spinoff of L: Change the World focusing on Touta Matsuda was announced to air on Japanese television. Sōta Aoyama reprised his role of Matsuda for the shooting of the theatrical film. However, all of his scenes were cut to be combined with additional scenes shot later to create the TV special.

=== Novel ===
On 9 November 2007, it was announced that the film L: Change the World would be adapted into a light novel of the same name. The writer of this novel was not revealed, though it was credited to "M", a pseudonym of Mello, one of L's successors. Although the storyline of the novel is based on the film, additional scenes not present in the film are included in the novel.

This novel was first published in Japan by Shūeisha, and it was released on 25 December 2007. Publisher Viz Media translated this novel into English, and it released the novel within North America on 20 October 2009. This light novel became the second-bestselling book in Japan for the year 2008, selling a total of 121,046 copies. It was second only to the light novel that was based on the manga Gintama, which sold 157,754 copies.

=== Photo book ===
Actor Kenichi Matsuyama released a photo book of himself using the identity of "L". The photo book was released at the same time the film was released. The photos in the book were photographed by Mika Ninagawa, who reportedly came up with the idea of releasing a photo book. The photos were taken during the period of August to September 2007 and were taken at locations like Shibuya Center Gai and Hanayashiki Amusement Park in Asakusa district.
