= Death Note (2017 film) =

2017 film by Adam Wingard

- Promotional release poster
- Directed by: Adam Wingard
- Screenplay by: Charley Parlapanides Vlas Parlapanides; Jeremy Slater
- Based on: Death Note by: Tsugumi Ohba; Takeshi Obata
- Produced by: Roy Lee; Dan Lin; Masi Oka; Jason Hoffs; Ted Sarandos
- Starring: Nat Wolff; LaKeith Stanfield; Margaret Qualley; Shea Whigham; Paul Nakauchi; Jason Liles; Willem Dafoe
- Cinematography: David Tattersall
- Edited by: Louis Cioffi
- Music by: Atticus Ross; Leopold Ross
- Production companies: Netflix; Vertigo Entertainment; LP Entertainment
- Distributed by: Netflix
- Release dates: August 24, 2017 (FrightFest); August 25, 2017 (United States)
- Running time: 100 minutes
- Country: United States
- Language: English (Note: Some dialogue spoken in Spanish, Chinese, German, and Japanese.)
- Budget: $40 million

Death Note is a 2017 American supernatural crime thriller film directed by Adam Wingard from a screenplay by Charles and Vlas Parlapanides and Jeremy Slater, loosely based on the manga of the same name by Tsugumi Ohba and Takeshi Obata. It stars Nat Wolff, LaKeith Stanfield, Margaret Qualley, Shea Whigham, Paul Nakauchi, Jason Liles, and Willem Dafoe. The plot follows an American high school student named Light Turner (portrayed by Wolff), who finds a mysterious supernatural notebook known as the Death Note and uses it to murder criminals around the globe under the alias of Kira, while an international detective known only as L (portrayed by Stanfield) seeks to find and arrest him.

Death Note premiered at FrightFest on August 24, 2017, and was released by Netflix on August 25, 2017. It received negative reviews from critics and fans. As of September 2021, a sequel is in development, with Greg Russo attached to write the screenplay.

== Plot ==
In Seattle, Washington, high school senior student Light Turner stumbles upon the Death Note, a mysterious and ancient notebook that can supernaturally kill any person whose name is written in it. He then meets Ryuk—a Japanese death god who conducts the killings—and is convinced by him to begin using it; Light writes down the name of his school bully Kenny Doyle and watches him die in a freak accident. That night, he uses the Death Note again, this time targeting his mother's murderer Anthony Skomal. The next morning, his father James, who is a police detective, informs him of Skomal's gruesome death. At school, Light befriends fellow student Mia Sutton and shows her the notebook's power by meticulously engineering the death of an armed felon during a televised hostage situation. The two start dating and work together to rid the world of criminals and terrorists, with Light adopting the Japanese pseudonym "Kira" to mislead law enforcement away from his continent.

Enigmatic international detective L begins investigating Kira's identity in Tokyo and deduces that he is from Seattle, and indirectly concludes that he cannot kill without knowing his victims' names and faces. Working with James and the Seattle Police Department, L has the Federal Bureau of Investigation track Light and other suspects. Light rejects Mia's request to kill the agents, but soon learns of their bizarre mass suicide, which he blames on Ryuk. James threatens Kira on television and returns unharmed, convincing L that Light is Kira. Later, after seeing L's face unmasked, Light uses the Death Note to force L's assistant Watari to go to Montauk, New York, where L's true name is hidden at a secret orphanage; he plans to control Watari for 48 hours, burn his page to avoid killing him, and then kill L. Meanwhile, L brings a police team to search Light's house, but Mia sneaks the notebook out before it can be found.

Light and Mia attend their school's dance event, using it to ditch L and the police. Watari contacts Light, but is killed by security guards before he can reveal L's name, owing to Light's failure to find and burn his page. Distraught, Light returns to Mia and discovers that she caused the agents' suicide and, because only one victim can be saved, withheld Watari's page; Mia tells Light that she has written his name in the Death Note and is set to kill him at midnight, citing his supposed lack of conviction in Kira's cause, though she subsequently offers to burn his page if he surrenders the notebook to her. Light yields, telling her to meet him at the Seattle Great Wheel for the transfer. Enraged at Watari's death, L embarks on a personal manhunt against Light, whom James has ordered the police to protect. Following a lengthy chase, L corners Light at gunpoint before being knocked unconscious by a nearby Kira supporter. Rendezvousing with Mia, Light takes her to the top of the Great Wheel and tells her that they should leave the notebook and run away to build a new life together. Unrelenting, she wrests it from him, but quickly realizes that he has written her name in it, with her death being contingent on her taking it from him. Ryuk destroys the structure, killing Mia and plunging Light into the water below. L arrives on scene and sees Light's page land in a burning barrel.

Prior to confronting Mia, Light had used the Death Note to arrange for a criminally-charged doctor to rescue him and put him into a medically induced coma, while having another criminal recover the notebook and continue Kira's killings before returning it to him, shortly thereafter killing both individuals via forced suicide. Having been ordered off the case for his apparent misconduct, L defiantly raids Mia's house and finds the page with the agents' names. In a hysterical fit, he considers writing down a name (implied to be Light's) to avenge Watari. At the hospital, James, now aware of the truth, questions Light, who insists that his actions were the "lesser of two evils." Ryuk then peeks around the corner, remarking that "humans are so interesting" while laughing maniacally at Light.

== Cast ==
- Nat Wolff as Light Turner / Kira:
  A bright yet isolated high-school student who discovers the titular Death Note and uses it to kill criminals by writing their names and causes of death, in a bid to change the world into a utopia without crime, and thus becoming the world-famous serial killer known as Kira, while being both praised and feared by law enforcement agencies and the worldwide media and public. In stark contrast to his manga counterpart, this version of Light lacks much of the original's ruthless, sadistic and sociopathic tendencies and is depicted in a more sympathetic and humanized light. However, at the end of the film, he does show a somewhat darker, more intellectual side to his character that is not unlike the Light from the anime and manga.
- LaKeith Stanfield as L:
  A nameless, highly-intelligent and esteemed—but also socially eccentric and quirky—international consulting detective with a past shrouded in mystery and who is determined to capture "Kira" and end his reign of terror.
- Margaret Qualley as Mia Sutton:
  Light's classmate and partner, who assists him in his worldwide massacre of criminals as the god-like vigilante: Kira, eventually seeking to kill those who seek to stop them and becoming dangerously obsessed with the book's power. In an interview with io9, Adam Wingard noted that rather than being a direct adaptation of the manga character Misa Amane, Sutton is partially based on the sociopathic qualities of Light Yagami.
- Shea Whigham as Detective James Turner:
  Light's widowed father and a veteran Seattle police detective, who assists L in finding the mysterious Kira, unaware that he is his own son. Unlike the original manga version, James has lost his wife in an acquitted hit-and-run crime and has a more strained relationship with his son.
- Paul Nakauchi as Watari:
  L's assistant and foster-father.
- Jason Liles and Willem Dafoe as Ryuk:
  A demonic Shinigami (god of death) and the original owner of the Death Note, who begins communicating with Light when he receives the book and inquisitively observes his activities as Kira with amusement. Liles played the character in costume, while Dafoe provided voice work and performance capture for the facial elements. Nakamura Shidō II, who played Ryuk in both the anime and live-action films, reprised the role in the Japanese dub.

Producer Masi Oka makes a cameo as Detective Sasaki: a Tokyo police detective investigating one of Light's murders. Christopher Britton—who played Soichiro Yagami, James Turner's original counterpart from the manga, in the English dub of the Death Note anime—makes a cameo appearance as Aaron Peltz, a serial child molester and one of Light's victims.

== Production ==
=== Development ===
In 2007, the Malaysian newspaper The Star stated that more than ten film companies in the United States had expressed interest in the Death Note franchise. The American production company Vertigo Entertainment was originally set to develop the remake, with Charley and Vlas Parlapanides as screenwriters and Roy Lee, Doug Davison, Dan Lin, and Brian Witten as producers. On April 30, 2009, Variety reported that Warner Bros. Pictures, the distributors for the original Japanese live-action films, had acquired the rights for an American remake, with the original screenwriters and producers still attached. In 2009, Zac Efron responded to rumors that he would be playing the film's lead role by stating that the project was "not on the front burner". On January 13, 2011, it was announced that Shane Black had been hired to direct the film, with the script being written by Anthony Bagarozzi and Charles Mondry. Warner's studios planned to change the background story of Light Yagami into one of vengeance instead of justice and to remove Shinigami from the story. Black opposed this change, and it had not been green-lit. Black confirmed in a 2013 interview with Bleeding Cool that he was still working on the film. In July 2014, it was rumored that Gus Van Sant would replace Black as the film's new director, with Dan Lin, Doug Davison, Roy Lee and Brian Witten producing through Vertigo Entertainment, Witten Pictures and Lin Pictures.

On April 27, 2015, The Hollywood Reporter revealed that Adam Wingard would direct the film, that Lin, Lee, Jason Hoffs, and Masi Oka would produce, and that Niija Kuykendall and Nik Mavinkurve would oversee the studio. Producers stated the film would receive an R rating. In April 2016, TheWrap reported that because Warner Bros. had decided to make fewer films, the studio put the film into turnaround but allowed Wingard to take the project elsewhere. Within 48 hours, Wingard was reportedly approached by nearly every major film studio. On April 6, 2016, it was confirmed that Netflix had bought the film from Warner Bros. with a budget of $40–50 million and a recent draft of the script being written by Jeremy Slater. Production officially began in British Columbia on June 30, 2016, where Vancouver doubled as Seattle, overseen by DN (Canada) Productions, Inc. Atticus Ross and Leopold Ross composed the score for the film.

=== Casting ===
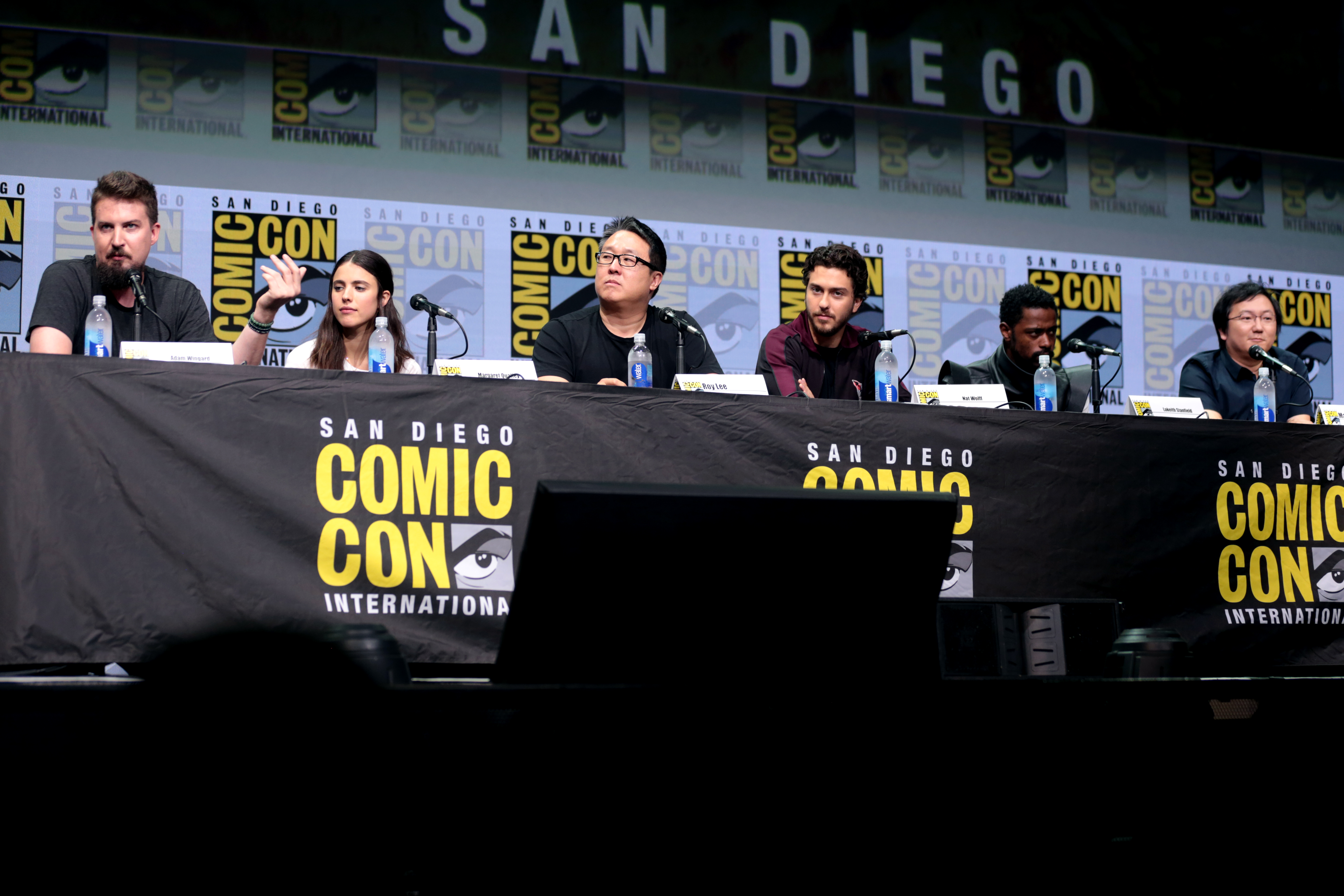
The cast and crew of Death Note at the 2017 San Diego Comic-Con

On September 29, 2015, Nat Wolff was cast in the lead role. On November 12, 2015, Margaret Qualley joined the film as the female lead. In June 2016, LaKeith Stanfield joined the cast. On June 30, 2016, it was announced that Paul Nakauchi and Shea Whigham had joined the cast. On August 2, 2016, Willem Dafoe was announced to voice the Shinigami Ryuk. In the wake of Dafoe's casting, Brian Drummond, who voiced Ryuk in the English dub of the anime, voiced his approval citing the casting of Ryuk. Oka, one of the film's producers, announced that he also has a role in the film.

Early casting announcements, similar to other Hollywood productions based on Japanese manga such as Dragonball Evolution and Ghost in the Shell, resulted in accusations of whitewashing. In response, producers Roy Lee and Dan Lin stated: "Our vision for Death Note has always been to...introduce the world to this dark and mysterious masterpiece. The talent and diversity represented in our cast, writing, and producing teams reflect our belief in staying true to the story's concept of moral relevance—a universal theme that knows no racial boundaries."

Wingard addressed the concerns over the film, explaining that the film is an American take on the Death Note story, stating, "It's one of those things where the harder I tried to stay 100 percent true to the source material, the more it just kind of fell apart... You're in a different country, you're in a different kind of environment, and you're trying to also summarize a sprawling series into a two-hour-long film. For me, it became about; what do these themes mean to modern day America, and how does that affect how we tell the story." Wingard also stated that he mainly attempted to make a unique and different take on the original manga, while also trying to keep the core themes and elements of the original manga intact, such as the cat and mouse dynamic between the main protagonists: Light and L, the themes of morality and justice, the difference between good and evil, certain characteristics and elements of the original manga characters (such as Light's father still being a police officer, L's mannerisms and personality traits, along with his background and past originating from a secluded orphanage, Light being depicted as an intellectually-gifted and introverted high school student, Ryuk's personality traits and affinity for apples).

== Release ==
The film was screened at FrightFest in London, before being released on Netflix on August 25, 2017. On July 20, 2017, the film was screened early for audiences at San Diego Comic-Con.

=== Critical reception ===
Death Note received mostly mixed to negative reviews. On review aggregation website Rotten Tomatoes, the film has an approval rating of 36% based on 77 reviews, and an average rating of 4.8/10. The site's critical consensus reads, "Death Note benefits from director Adam Wingard's distinctive eye and a talented cast, but they aren't enough to overcome a fatally overcrowded canvas." Metacritic gave the film a score of 43 out of 100, based on 14 critics, indicating "mixed or average" reviews.

Jeanette Catsoulis for The New York Times wrote that the film "feels rushed and constricted" compared to the volume of the source material, but praised how Wingard's direction focused on "mood over mayhem" to make the adaptation his own. Peter Debruge for Variety said that he felt that Wingard took the film adaptation towards a Donnie Darko-styled work that would capture the interest of more Western audiences compared to the original work, but made the work capture the feel of a theatrical film rather than a work confined to its original medium. Debruge also wrote that despite the philosophical concepts of murdering via the Death Note, "the movie never quite reckons with just how twisted a concept it's peddling, and that's easily the scariest thing about it". Brian Tallerico for Rogerebert.com gave the film one of four stars, stating that the changes that Wingard had made from the original work did not serve any artistic or thematic purpose, nor captured the cat-and-mouse game between Light and L that was core to the original work, and because the producers "refused to make Light the antihero he needed to be", the addition of Mia as a love interest "[left] the project hollow at its center" — but mainly praised the performances of Stanfield and Dafoe.

Tsugumi Ohba and Takeshi Obata, the original creators of Death Note, have praised the film, with the former stating, "In a good way, it both followed and diverged from the original work so the film can be enjoyed, of course by not only the fans, but also by a much larger and wider audience."

Director Adam Wingard deleted his Twitter account after receiving backlash from the negative reviews.

=== Use of train accident images ===
A few months after release, it was discovered that the images of the train accident in the movie were real footage of a 2010 train collision in Buizingen, Belgium, in which 19 people died. Both the rail operator and survivors have criticized this as disrespectful to the victims.

== Sequel ==
In an interview with Heat Vision, Wingard stated that Netflix had wanted to make at least two films, and would if the success of the first film merited it, saying, "There are definitely lots of places to go, and we know generally where we would take it. Hopefully, people will watch it and Netflix will order a sequel. They definitely are ready to. They just need people to watch it."

On October 17, 2017, Sarandos spoke with Quartz and mentioned that the film showed sizable viewership, along with others. "There are three different films released this quarter, that if viewing was buying a movie ticket, would be of sizable successes in Death Note, Naked, and To the Bone."

On August 22, 2018, The Hollywood Reporter reported that a sequel was in development, with Greg Russo writing the script. On April 20, 2021, Russo revealed that the sequel would be more faithful to the manga than the first film. On September 21, 2021, Oka stated that the sequel promises fan criticism of the first film will be taken into account.
