= Death Note: Killer Within =

2024 video game

- Developer: Grounding Inc.
- Publisher: Bandai Namco Entertainment
- Director: Akihiro Igarashi
- Designers: Masahiro Yamada; Masao Suganuma
- Artist: Ryoji Nakamura
- Composer: Rin Matsubayashi
- Series: Death Note
- Platforms: PlayStation 4; Windows; PlayStation 5
- Release: November 5, 2024
- Genres: Social deduction, strategy
- Mode: Multiplayer

Death Note: Killer Within is a 2024 online multiplayer social deduction game developed by Grounding Inc. and published by Bandai Namco Entertainment. It is based on the 2003 manga series Death Note written by Tsugumi Ohba and illustrated by Takeshi Obata. Players are represented as chess pawns, similar to Near's finger puppets, and divided into two teams—Kira alongside his followers and L with the police investigation team. Both teams must uncover the identities of the opposing players.

Death Note: Killer Within is the fourth video game entry in the Death Note series, following the release of Death Note: Kira Game (2007), Death Note: Successors to L (2007), and L the Prologue to Death Note: Spiraling Trap (2008) almost a decade later. The game would receive mixed reviews from critics. Criticism was drawn for its limited gameplay, multiplayer communication and server stability.

== Gameplay ==
Death Note: Killer Within's is an online multiplayer social deduction game. During gameplay, characters' avatars are based off Near's finger puppets, revealed towards the end of the anime and manga. There are also customization options that allow players to have their avatar resemble the Death Note Nendoroid figures released in previous years. In the game, up to ten players are split into two teams—Kira and his followers and L alongside his investigation team. Kira's team aims to kill all targets with the Death Note while L's team must seize and dispose of the Death Note. During the Action Phase, players must complete tasks and discover clues, and later participate in the Meeting Phase to figure out who's Kira. Both teams must uncover the identities of the opposing players. In 2025, updates had introduced roles as Mello, Watari and Soichiro Yagami.

== Promotion and release ==
Bandai Namco Entertainment announced Death Note: Killer Within via a trailer in October 2024, alongside cross-play support for PC and PlayStation for the game. The final version was released and ported to Windows, Playstation 4 and 5, and the Playstation Plus subscription service in November 2024.

== Reception ==
Reception

Aggregate score
Aggregator	Score
Metacritic	PC: 71/100; P55: 54/100

Review scores
Publication	Score
Shacknews	6/10
Siliconera	6.5/10

Upon release, Death Note: Killer Within received mixed or average reviews from video game publications based on the review aggregate website Metacritic aimed towards the PC and PS5 ports.

Much of the focus within reviews involved feedback in regards to the requirement of voice chat for communication, and the game's resemblance of online multiplayer social deduction game Among Us (2018). Shacknews writer Lucas White praised the game, calling it "smart adaptation of a Shonen Jump manga", while saying that it combined of the "2000s pop-goth aesthetic" of Death Note with a board game. Some critics thought the game was light on content and lacked depth, particularly for the lack of maps included. Jason Hon from ScreenRant mentioned the game's issues with server stability. Jenni Lada of Siliconera praised the game's concept and said that it "works reasonably well" as a social deduction game.

Negative response often focused on communication, low difficulty and server stability. Jenni Lada criticized how "abruptly easy" the game was, saying that if one certain person leaves, the match ended. While Jason Hon discussed the game's lack of character depth and players disconnected due to the game's lack of server stability.
