= Death Note (2015 TV series) =

Japanese drama television series

- Death Note 2015 TV series poster
- Genre: Crime; Dark fantasy Mystery; Psychological thriller
- Based on: Death Note by: Tsugumi Ohba; Takeshi Obata
- Written by: Yoshihiro Izumi
- Directed by: Ryūichi Inomata; Ryō Nishimura; Marie Iwasaki
- Starring: Masataka Kubota; Kento Yamazaki; Mio Yūki; Hinako Sano
- Country of origin: Japan
- Original language: Japanese
- No. of episodes: 11

Production
- Producers: Katsu Kamikura; Akino Suzuki; Yoshitaka Ōmori; Yoshinori Shigeyama
- Running time: 55–85 minutes

Original release
- Network: NTV
- Release: July 5 – September 13, 2015

Death Note (Japanese: デスノート) is a Japanese television drama series based on the manga series of the same name by Tsugumi Ohba and Takeshi Obata. The show stars Masataka Kubota as Light Yagami, Kento Yamazaki as L, and Mio Yūki as Near / Mello and focuses on the story of an intelligent yet reserved college student named Light Yagami, who finds a mysterious black notebook known as the Death Note, which can kill anyone whose name is written within its pages. Intrigued with the notebook's god-like abilities, he begins to use the Death Note to kill those whom he sees as unworthy of life, in a bid to change the world into a utopia. Soon, the student/vigilante finds himself pursued by an enigmatic international detective, known only as: "L".

The drama premiered on NTV on July 5, 2015. The first episode received a viewership rating of 16.9% in the Kantō region.

== Cast ==
- Masataka Kubota as Light Yagami: The main protagonist who, after receiving a Death Note, operates as the vigilante "Kira".
- Kento Yamazaki as L Lawliet: A world-renowned detective set on capturing Kira.
- Jun Fukushima as the voice of Ryuk: A shinigami who serves as the original owner of Light's Death Note.
- Daisaku Nishino as the motion capture actor of Ryuk
- Ayumi Tsunematsu as the voice of Rem: A shinigami who serves as the owner of Misa's Death Note.
- Mio Yūki as Nate River / Mello: A young child with a split-personality serving as L's successor.
- Hinako Sano as Misa Amane: A pop idol who falls in love with Light and serves as one of his accomplices.
- Yutaka Matsushige as Sōichirō Yagami: Light's father and the head of the Kira investigation task force.
- Reiko Fujiwara as Sayu Yagami: Light's sister.
- Gōki Maeda as Tōta Matsuda: A Kira investigation team member.
- Tomohisa Yuge as Shūichi Aizawa: A Kira investigation team member.
- Jirō Satō as Kanzō Mogi: A Kira investigation team member.
- Megumi Seki as Shōko Himura (日村 章子 Himura Shōko) / Halle Lidner: A Kira investigation team member who also works directly with L.
- Kazuaki Hankai as Quilish Wammy / Watari: L's assistant and handler.
- Shugo Oshinari as Teru Mikami: A public prosecutor who serves as another one of Light's accomplices.
- Ian Moore as Lind L. Tailor: A convicted criminal waiting on the death row which was used by L as a trap to expose Light/Kira's location.

== Episodes ==
No.	Promotional slogan	Directed by	Original air date	Ratings (%)
1	"伝説の大人気コミック遂にドラマ化! 死のノートで壮大な野望を抱く殺人鬼と天才探偵による命がけの頭脳戦・今夜幕開け!"	Ryūichi Inomata	July 5, 2015	16.9
Average college student Light Yagami discovers a black notebook that claims to be able to kill anyone whose name and face is known to its owner. After testing the notebook on a bully and a criminal holding his father Soichiro Yagami hostage, Light is met by the notebook's original owner – a shinigami named Ryuk. After some persuasion by Ryuk, Light becomes compelled to use the notebook as a means to create a utopia and he eventually becomes known to the public as Kira. However, genius detective L tricks Light into revealing that Kira lives in Japan's Kanto region with a fake television broadcast. L also discovers that Kira is receiving information from the Japanese police, causing him to suspect them and their family members. At the end of the episode, Ryuk reveals to Light that he is being tailed by an FBI agent.
2	"全世代で話題沸騰の新ドラマ 激突! 迫り来る天才Lの刺客"	Ryūichi Inomata	July 12, 2015	12.3
Ryuk who can see the lifespan of humans, reveals to Light that Misa Amane, a popular idol who Light is a fan of, may only have a few days to live. Light attempts to warn Misa after one of her concerts, but fails. However, one of her security guards, Tsutomu Yukida, overhears Light's warnings and offers to help Light protect Misa. Meanwhile, L meets with a few members of the Japanese police, one of which includes Soichiro, in order to form a task force dedicated to capturing Kira. Later, Light devises a plan to discover the name of the FBI agent following him after discovering that he can manipulate the actions of his victims before killing them with the notebook. Using a criminal to orchestrate a bus-jacking, Light tricks the agent into revealing his name; Raye Penber. He writes Raye's name in the notebook, detailing that Raye will shoot L once he reports to him. Later, Light receives a phone call from Yukida, only to discover that he will be the one to end Misa's life. After being knocked unconscious by Yukida, Misa wakes up to find him dead and the shinigami Rem leaving a red Death Note beside her. At the end of the episode, Light is accused of being Kira by L over the phone, who also reveals that Raye Penber was in fact an alias.
3	"Lの仕掛けた罠にキラ絶体絶命! 逆襲への最後の切り札とは!?"	Ryō Nishimura	July 19, 2015	8.7
With "Raye Penber" still following him, Light realizes that L's phone call was in fact a trap. Light becomes determined to kill all the FBI agents involved in the Kira case in order to disperse suspicion on him. In the midst of his planning, Light remembers finding a picture of Cathy Campbell, the name of Raye's lover, during the bus-jacking incident. Meanwhile, Misa sacrifices half of her remaining lifespan to Rem in order to receive the shinigami eyes, allowing her to see the real names and lifespans of anyone she looks at. Since a human with the shinigami eyes cannot see the lifespans of someone who owns a Death Note, Misa is able to deduce that Light is Kira after spotting him at one of her concerts. Later, Light is able to blackmail Raye into writing the names of the other FBI agents into pages of the notebook by threatening to kill Cathy. However, Raye eventually sees through the plan and tricks Light into revealing himself to be Kira. Misa, who has been following Light without his knowledge, kills Raye by writing his real name, Mark Dwellton, into her notebook.
4	"衝撃の出会い...キラ対Lついに直接対決! 張りめぐらされた罠"	Ryō Nishimura	July 26, 2015	10.6
Suspecting that Mark Dwellton met with Kira before his death, L plants cameras and listening devices in the houses of families Mark was following. Light quickly realizes this and formulates a plan to temporarily prove his innocence to the task force members. However, L's suspicions do not waver and he enrolls into Light's university in order to investigate him personally. Meanwhile, Misa becomes determined to find Light, having become a Kira supporter since the day Light punished her parents' murderer. After leaving a televised message asking the police to cooperate with Kira, Misa finds Light in his house and rushes to his room, unaware that L's cameras are still in place.
5	"キラ驚きの行動へ! ついに捜査本部へ潜入、Lと再び直接対決"	Ryūichi Inomata	August 2, 2015	8.2
Light manages to get Misa out of his house and the two meet at a park. There, Misa reveals that she has fallen in love with Light and wishes to help him kill L. At the same time, L reveals to the task force that, based on the killings made at the wake of the recent broadcast, a second Kira may have appeared. L then suggests recruiting Light into the investigation team both as a way to move the investigation further and get him to possibly reveal himself as Kira. Later, Rem reveals to Light that it was Gelus and not her who saved Misa from Yukida, explaining that a shinigami can die by extending a human's lifespan. L and Soichiro, meanwhile, investigate Yukida's death, discovering that he died of a heart attack- Kira's primary method of killing. This, coupled with a trail of evidence left behind by Misa, causes her to be arrested by the task force on the grounds of being the second Kira.
6	"ついにキラ逮捕! 僕がキラだ...自白に隠された驚愕の作戦とは"	Ryō Nishimura	August 9, 2015	10.2
Rem decides to have Misa relinquish ownership of her notebook, causing her to lose all memories associated with the Death Note. Rem passes Misa's notebook to Light and demands that he save Misa. After devising a plan to prove his and Misa's innocence, Light buries Misa's notebook in a forest and tasks Rem with giving his original notebook to a greedy individual. Later, Light approaches L and the task force and requests to be placed under surveillance on the grounds that he could subconsciously be acting as Kira. After Light is incarcerated, the killing of criminals stops for some time, but they resume once Rem passes the notebook to a new owner. After he becomes sure of this, Light signals to Ryuk to relinquish ownership of his notebook, erasing his memories of being Kira. Later, L and Soichiro create a test for Light that allows him to prove both his and Misa's innocence. Meanwhile, Near, a mysterious protégé of L, contacts the task force and leads them to the conclusion that the current Kira is affiliated with the Yotsuba Corporation.
7	"全てはキラの計画通り...L、死へのカウントダウン最終決戦へ"	Marie Iwasaki	August 16, 2015	11.6
Light and Misa join forces with the task force in order to capture Kira. However, L's suspicions of the two do not waver as he suspects that they intentionally lost their memories by passing their powers to someone else. After realizing that they are under suspicion by the authorities, a group of Yotsuba executives enlist the aid of the investigator Babel, who is revealed to be Near in disguise. The efforts of Light, Misa and Near enable the task force to narrow down their suspicions to Yotsuba executive Kyosuke Higuchi. Using a fake television broadcast to lure him out, the task force is able to trap Higuchi and arrest him. Light regains his memories of being Kira and ownership after touching the notebook and killing Higuchi with a notebook scrap hidden inside his watch.
8	"さらば正義の探偵...ノートに書かれた名前は、L・ローライト"	Ryūichi Inomata	August 23, 2015	11.4
After the notebook is confiscated by the task force, a fake rule written by Ryuk convinces L that Light and Misa are innocent. With suspicion of being Kira cleared, Light asks Misa to uncover the red notebook from the forest he buried it in. Just as she is about to open the container it is sealed in, a thug named Hiroki Yudagawa attacks her and steals the container. The thug is eventually revealed to have been hired by Teru Mikami, a criminal prosecutor who has been following Misa after deducing her connection to Kira based on various news reports. After L exposes Yudagawa as the culprit, Light attempts to capture him but the thug manages to escape. After Kira's judgments continue again, Light considers the possibility of Yudagawa's associate being a Kira worshipper. Light, recalling a time when he met a prosecutor who professed his eagerness to help Kira, determines that Mikami is the new Kira. Light contacts Mikami directly and enlists his aid to dispose of L. Meanwhile, Near interrogates Yudagawa and discovers that he stole a notebook from Misa on behalf of a prosecutor. However, Yudagawa is killed by Mikami before he can reveal anything else. Later, L meets with Soichiro and reveals that Near is next in line to succeed L. He tells Soichiro to continue to watch Light as he has a plan to resolve the Kira case. The next day, Mikami and a team of prosecutors meet with the task force at their headquarters in an attempt to confiscate the black notebook. Light, meanwhile, meets with L in an abandoned warehouse. L, who has the black notebook in his hands, discusses the Kira investigation with the task force through a video camera. L then destroys the camera and attempts to convince Light to give up being Kira. As Light maintains his innocence, L begins writing Light's name into the notebook, forcing Light to wrestle the notebook away. Mikami, who is revealed to have the shinigami eyes, texts Light L's real name after seeing his face through L's camera. Light writes down "L. Lawliet" into the notebook but L does not die.
9	"Lは俺が殺した...告白に隠された逆転劇・復讐を誓いニア始動"	Marie Iwasaki	August 30, 2015	11.7
L reveals that he had tricked Light into writing into a fake notebook, thus; exposing the latter as Kira. After Light confesses to L, the rest of the task force enter the warehouse only to see L die from a heart attack, courtesy of Mikami. Since only L heard the confession, Light convinces the task force members that L gave Light his real name and wrote it down in an act of self-defense. After L's funeral, Near takes over L's duties as head of the task force and focuses the investigation on the prosecutors that came into the task force headquarters the day L died. Meanwhile, Light meets with Misa and Mikami at a rooftop and restores Misa's memories of being the second Kira by tying a scrap from the red notebook onto her wrist. Later, task force member Shoko Himura betrays her team and conspires with a mysterious group of men to kidnap Sayu, Light's sister. Himura and her associates demand that the task force hand over the black notebook in exchange for Sayu's life.
10	"ニア暴走の果て、暴かれる息子の正体! 父の名前がノートに..."	Ryō Nishimura	September 6, 2015	11.4
Light and the task force attempt to ambush Himura's group and rescue Sayu by pretending to exchange the notebook for her life. However, Mello, Near's ambitious alter-ego, awakens and takes over Near. Mello appears during the ambush and reveals himself to be the leader of Himura's group. Though Sayu is rescued, the notebook falls into Himura's possession. At the task force headquarters, Light discovers the name of one of the kidnappers, Mason Fujiyama, and uses him to reveal the real names of the other kidnappers. Light uses the information to plan a second ambush at Mello's hideout, leading to the latter's incarceration. However, Mello escapes from confinement before his real name can be exposed by Mikami. Later, Light uses Himura's real name, Halle Lidner, to manipulate her into returning the notebook to him. Soichiro, who has been keeping an eye on Light as per L's request, witnesses Light regaining the notebook. He confronts Light and after failing to convince him to give up the mantle of Kira, commits suicide by writing his own name in the notebook. Meanwhile, Lidner, influenced by the Death Note, carries out a suicide bombing at Mello's new hideout.
11	"今夜最終回! 驚愕の結末! 最後の戦いを1秒も見逃すな"	Ryūichi Inomata	September 13, 2015	14.1
Mello survives the bombing and, over the phone, vows to expose Light as Kira. Light plans another ambush with the task force and Japanese police in order to defeat Mello. Later, Light meets with Misa and Mikami and orders them to kill the task force and Mello respectively. During the ambush, Light confronts Mello in a warehouse, who reverts to his Near personality. Near reveals that he pretended to be taken over by Mello as part of a plan to expose Mikami as the current Kira. Meanwhile, Mikami, who has also entered the warehouse, uses his shinigami eyes to write down Near's real name, Nate River, in his notebook. Once Light prematurely declares victory and Mikami's notebook is revealed to have been switched with a replica, they are both implicated as Kira. The task force and the police subsequently ambush Light and reveal that they were working with Near/Mello the entire time. Via a televised message recorded prior to his death, L reveals he orchestrated Sayu's kidnapping and accumulated more than enough evidence to prove Light is Kira. After Near and the task force reveal Soichiro sacrificed himself to raise suspicion on Light and Lidner was secretly an FBI agent planted by L, Light confesses to being Kira. Near, who has the real notebook in his possession, is attacked by Mikami, but is shot by police. Light uses the ensuing struggle as an opportunity to use his own notebook hidden underneath his clothes only to also be shot. In desperation, Mikami sets fire to the warehouse, unintentionally trapping Light in a circle of fire. As everyone evacuates the warehouse but Light, Mikami's real notebook burns, causing both Misa and Mikami to lose their memories of being Kira. As a result, Misa forgets that she was ordered to kill the task force. Meanwhile, Ryuk and Rem leave the human world after Light burns to death trying to reclaim the other notebook.

Preceded by Wild Heroes (19 April 2015 – 21 June 2015)	NTV Sunday Dramas; Sundays 22:30 – 23:25 (JST)	Succeeded by Angel Heart (11 October 2015 – December 2015)
