= Ryuk (Death Note) =

Fictional character from Death Note

- Death Note character
- Ryuk, drawn by Takeshi Obata
- First appearance: Chapter 1: "Boredom" (退屈, Taikutsu) (2004)
- Created by: Tsugumi Ohba; Takeshi Obata
- Voiced by: Nakamura Shidō II (Japanese, anime and films); Jun Fukushima (Japanese, TV drama); Brian Drummond (English, anime and films); Willem Dafoe (American film)
- Portrayed by: Kōtarō Yoshida (musical); Jason Liles (American film)

In-universe information
- Species: Shinigami

Ryuk (Japanese: リューク, Hepburn: Ryūku) is a fictional character in the manga series Death Note, created by Tsugumi Ohba and Takeshi Obata. He is a Shinigami that drops a Death Note, a notebook that allows the user to kill anyone simply by knowing their name and face, into the human world to find relief from the boredom of his own realm. It is picked up by Light Yagami, a bright high school student who uses it in an attempt to create and rule a utopia cleansed of evil, with him at the helm as a "god".

In the anime adaptation, Ryuk is voiced by Nakamura Shidō in Japanese and by Brian Drummond in the English version. Both actors reprise their roles for voicing the computer-generated version of the character in the live-action films, with Jun Fukushima voicing the CG version in the live-action television drama. In the musical, Ryuk was portrayed by Kōtarō Yoshida. In the American live-action film adaptation Jason Liles played the character in costume while Willem Dafoe provided the voice acting and facial motion capture.

== Creation and conception ==
Obata said that he encountered difficulty in designing Ryuk. He said that his original idea of Ryuk consisted of Ryuk looking like a "young man similar to Light" with black hair and wings. Obata said that he had the idea of Shinigami looking like "attractive rock stars." Obata felt that if Ryuk appeared more attractive than Light, he would "appear to be the main character" and "things wouldn't work as well." Obata said that he decided to erase the previous design and use the final design in which Ryuk has a reptile-like appearance when his editor told him that Ryuk did not have to appear human. Obata said that he liked the "monster"-like appearance and added that, with his face, "you can never really tell what he is thinking." Obata said that he encountered difficulty while drawing Ryuk in the pilot chapter since he did not "have a good handle" on the "bone structure of his face." Obata said that during serialization he became "so used" to the underlying structure that he could visualize it. Obata describes Ryuk's face as appearing different between the pilot chapter and the actual Death Note series. In 13: How to Read Obata thought of an idea involving Ryuk's face being a mask, and under the mask would be an "attractive" face.

When designing Ryuk's Death Note, Obata thought about the appearance of Ryuk's handwriting. Ryuk wrote the words "Death Note" on the cover of his own notebook, and when he took possession of Sidoh's book he wrote the same words on the front cover.

=== Films ===
Shūsuke Kaneko, director of the live-action films, said that he chose to create Ryuk with computer graphics as it would make the aspect of Ryuk only appearing to people who have touched the Death Note "believable" and that the audience could "tell instinctually" that Ryuk is a Shinigami with "no real presence." Kaneko added that if a human actor represented Ryuk, the appearance would have been "too realistic," the actor may have impacted Ryuk's "presence," and the audience may have "doubted he was a death god, if only for a second." Kaneko ordered the graphics team to design the graphics as if it were an actor "inside a rubber suit."

Digital Frontier, a computer graphics company, animated Ryuk. Kaneko said that because Ryuk's physical structure is "different from a human’s," he thought of an idea of visualizing a person in a Ryuk costume. He also wanted the audience to think of Ryuk as a person in a Ryuk costume talking to Tatsuya Fujiwara, the actor who plays Light. He said that he was "asking for too much" and that he wanted audiences to see the film Ryuk as more than "a product of the latest CG technology." Fujiwara said that due to the constant filming with Ryuk he rarely interacted with other actors during the filming of the first film; The Star of Malaysia describes Fujiwara's emotions as "mock frustration." Fujiwara described the CG Ryuk as "so selfish" and "far more difficult to work with" than a human actor.

The director of the American adaptation, Adam Wingard, wanted to do the opposite of the Japanese films and have an actor on set portraying Ryuk as much as possible. They had seven-foot-tall actor Jason Liles wearing the suit and performing both the mannerisms and dialogue alongside the other actors, but cut out his face and voice and used Willem Dafoe's facial capture and dialogue. "What we did was basically cut out the on-set creature's face and had Jason wear these red LED glasses, so at least we could see a representation of his glowing eyes, knowing we were going to replace that later with some CGI, and then voice it over with Willem." The production initially created a large prototype, animatronic puppet of Ryuk to use, but it was eventually abandoned.

== Appearances ==
=== In Death Note ===
Ryuk is a Shinigami bored with the activities (or lack thereof) of the Shinigami realm, so he decides to obtain a second Death Note and drop it in the human world for someone to find, hoping to relieve his boredom. He succeeds in tricking the Shinigami King out of a second Death Note. He deliberately writes the instructions inside the front cover (in English, which he assumed to be the most popular language in the human realm) so people would understand its purpose.

The Death Note is discovered by Light Yagami, and Ryuk follows him around for much of the series to see how Light uses it. Ryuk has a fairly humanoid appearance. His skin is blueish gray, or a purplish color, his limbs are abnormally long, and he has bulging yellow eyes with black irises (red in the anime); in the films, he is represented by CGI.

Ryuk is characterized by his constant amusement by, and apathy in regards to, Light's problems as well as his interest in humans. He enjoys seeing Light overcome the various challenges put to him, and often waits until the worst possible moment to inform him of a certain aspect of the Death Note just to get a laugh. He is occasionally helpful if it serves his own interests, such as obtaining apples or furthering his own amusement, but for the most part will jokingly ask Light what his next move will be or have Light explain to him the point of a certain action. He tells Light in the first volume he doesn't always look at what Light writes because he finds it more amusing. Light describes Ryuk as a "crazy-looking, supernatural creature with these wicked eyes" who becomes ("surprisingly") a "moral compass" for Light in the film version of Death Note.

Ryuk has a great fondness for apples, comparing their effect on Shinigami to that of cigarettes and alcohol. He claims to go through a type of withdrawal if he goes for too long without them. His withdrawal symptoms involve twisting himself up like a pretzel and doing handstands. He also states that he is shy around girls; when Misa Amane hugs him he becomes intangible. In addition to apples, Ryuk is fond of video games, first shown in the omake eight-panel comic series, where he asks for a Silver Game Boy Advance SP, originally published in Weekly Shonen Jump Volume 4-5 (double issue) in 2005. On another occasion, Ryuk asks Light if he wants to play Mario Golf (changed to "video games" in the anime), but receives no answer since Light's bedroom is bugged with cameras.

As Ryuk explains when he first meets Light, he is bound to take Light's life when his time comes. In the manga, Ryuk does this after Light is shot several times by Touta Matsuda. He desperately begs Ryuk to write the names of the investigation team and the SPK members in the Death Note, which he first implies he will do, but Ryuk, reminding Light that he is not on anyone's side, just writes Light's name instead. He was expecting Light might have thought of some way out of his situation, but seeing as he was desperate enough to go to Ryuk for help, he decided it was all over for him. Ryuk returns to the Shinigami realm after Light suffers an agitated death.

Two years later, Ryuk berates another shinigami in their attempt to replicate his success with Light by giving their own Death Note to a "weak" human. A further six years later, Ryuk returns to Earth and gives another human, Minoru Tanaka, his Death Note. Minoru asks him to return with the Death Note in another two years. Subsequently, in 2019, Ryuk returns and the pair sell the Death Note to the U.S. President (the text does not call him by a name, though Hannah Collins of Comic Book Resources stated "the uncanny likeness to the divisive political figure is hard to miss.") for $100 trillion, to be divided evenly amongst every Japanese bank account holder under the age of 60, before the human relinquishes (and memories of) his Death Note to Ryuk. When Ryuk returns to the Shinigami Realm before delivering the Death Note, the Shinigami King, berating him, adds a rule forbidding the sale of Death Notes, causing the U.S. president to reject the Death Note out of fear for his own life and merely tell the world he has it, while the human dies at the bank after Ryuk writes his name down.

=== In the anime ===
Ryuk in the anime.

In the anime adaptation, Light does not ask for Ryuk's help and manages to escape the warehouse thanks to Teru Mikami's suicide distracting everyone else. However his wounds are too severe for him to escape very far, and Ryuk, who is watching him from atop a pole, decides that following Light around during a prison sentence is not worth his time and thus writes Light's name in his Death Note, remarking that he had a lot of fun with him regardless. Unlike in the manga, Light died peacefully, with an apparition of L standing over him - mirroring Light standing over L on his death. Much later, after Ryuk returns to the Shinigami realm, he is asked by a new shinigami to recount his time on Earth as the latter prepares to go there himself, and Ryuk mentions Light as the unnamed shinigami leaves before Ryuk has finished recounting his tale.

=== In the pilot chapter ===
In the pilot chapter of Death Note, Ryuk is the master of two Death Notes which he drops into the human world; Taro Kagami picks up the first one, and Ryuk talks to Taro. The other is picked up by Taro's classmate, Miura. The police burn Miura's book, not knowing of the existence of the first book. At the end of the chapter, Ryuk follows an older Taro. Death Note 13: How to Read describes the Ryuk of the pilot chapter as "really lazy" and "incompetent".

=== In live-action media ===
In the film series, Ryuk is voiced by Nakamura Shidō. The second film ends in much the same manner as the manga, except Ryuk's silence leads Light to believe that he is willing to help. When Light learns differently, Light yells at Ryuk and jumps through him, trying in vain to stop his death before dying in his father's arms; before this, Ryuk takes this opportunity to reveal to Light that humans who have used the Death Note are unable to enter either Heaven or Hell regardless of their actions in life.

In the spin-off L: Change the World, Ryuk offers L the Death Note. When L refuses and proceeds to burn it, Ryuk complains that L is boring and disappears, returning to the Shinigami realm.

In the fourth film, Death Note: Light Up the New World, Nakamura Shidō reprises his role as the voice and motion capture of Ryuk. 10 years after the end of Kira case, Ryuk again visits the human world to find the successor of Kira on the shinigami king's order. He finds Light's biological son Hikari Yagami and gives him a death note. Teru Mikami, his guardian who raised him gets insane and kills him by writing his name in the notebook. The leader of Death Note task force, Tsukuru Mishima witnesses the whole thing and kills Mikami and takes his notebook. Tsukuru becomes the new owner and Ryuk stays with him. Later Mishima dispossesses his Death Note and asks Ryuk to give the Death Note and Light's message to the cyberterrorist, Yuki Shien. Ryuk finds his new mate. Later, Shien is killed in a crossfire and Ryuk is seen for last time talking to Mishima explaining why Shinigami are looking so hard for the next Kira, because the Shinigami King promised that anyone who finds the next Kira would have the throne after he retires. Ryuk also says that they will keep sending Death Notes until there is a next Kira. Ryuk says goodbye and disappears.

In the live-action TV drama, Ryuk is voiced by Jun Fukushima and Daisaku Nishino is the motion capture actor of Ryuk. At the end of the series, Light begs Ryuk's help but Ryuk lets Light burn in the fire. Then he returns to shinigami realm with Rem.

Actor Willem Dafoe provided the voice acting and motion capture of the character's facial elements in the American adaptation. Unlike the source material, Ryuk does not possess multiple Death Notes, and has passed the Death Note to various people throughout the decades, with each one of them using the notebook for different purposes. Despite the film's overall mixed critical reception, Dafoe's performance and characterization of Ryuk has been widely praised by fans and critics alike, with many singling him out as one of the film's main highlights.

== Reception ==
Tsugumi Ohba, story writer of Death Note, said that Ryuk is his favorite Shinigami and that "If I didn't say Ryuk here, his whole character would be in vain. [laughs] While praising Obata's artwork for the series, Zac Bertschy of Anime News Network singled out Ryuk as the prime example; describing him as "a grotesque hulking beast, the kind of thing most people would probably think of when they're asked to imagine what a grim spectre of death would look like." Briana Lawrence from the same website noted that despite being a vital character, Ryuk faded into the background as the series went on, only to become vital once again in the final chapter.

On the actor's voicework in the English dub of the anime, Tom S. Pepirium of IGN said that "Brian Drummond IS Ryuk." Pepirium described Drummond's voice as "excellent" and that this makes it "hilarious" to watch "Ryuk and his never-ending grin giggle at the events he put into motion." Kitty Sensei of OtakuZone had her opinions of the film portrayal of Ryuk published in The Star, a Malaysian newspaper. In it Kitty Sensei said that Ryuk "looks a little artificial in the beginning." She says that she became used to the portrayal and loved "Ryuk’s gleeful chuckles and fish-faced grins." The sfist describes Ryuk as the sole "(potential) cheeseball factor" of the first film and that he may be "difficult to get used to"; the article stated that Ryuk "adds" to the film if the viewers "let go enough to accept Ryuk's presence."
