= Death Note: Light Up the New World =

2016 Japanese horror film

- Theatrical release poster
- Directed by: Shinsuke Sato
- Written by: Katsunari Mano
- Based on: Death Note by: Tsugumi Ohba; Takeshi Obata
- Produced by: Tadashi Tanaka; Nobuhiro Iizuka; Takahiro Sato
- Starring: Masahiro Higashide; Sosuke Ikematsu; Masaki Suda; Erika Toda; Rina Kawaei; Mina Fujii; Nakamura Shidō II; Kenichi Matsuyama; Tatsuya Fujiwara
- Cinematography: Taro Kawazu
- Edited by: Tsuyoshi Imai
- Music by: Yutaka Yamada
- Production companies: Nippon Television Network Corporation; Shueisha; Horipro; Warner Bros. Pictures; Shochiku; Yomiuri Telecasting; VAP; Nikkatsu; Dentsu; Hulu; D.N. Dream Partners; Sapporo Television; Miyagi Television; Shizuoka Daiichi Television; Hiroshima Telecasting; Fukuoka Broadcasting Corporation; Aomori Broadcasting Corporation; Akita Broadcasting System; Fukushima Central Television; TV Shinshu; Kitanihon Broadcasting; Fukui Broadcasting; Yamaguchi Broadcasting; Nishinippon Broadcasting; Kochi Broadcasting; Kumamoto Kenmin Televisions; Kagoshima Yomiuri Television; Television Iwate; Yamagata Broadcasting; TV Niigata; Yamanashi Broadcasting System; TV Kanazawa; Nihonkai Telecasting; Shikoku Broadcasting; Nankai Broadcasting; Nagasaki International Television; TV Oita; Django Film
- Distributed by: Warner Bros. Pictures
- Release date: October 29, 2016
- Running time: 135 minutes
- Country: Japan
- Language: Japanese
- Box office: ¥2.3 billion (Japan) $20 million (worldwide)

Death Note: Light Up the New World (デスノート Light up the NEW world) is a 2016 Japanese film directed by Shinsuke Sato. The film is based on the manga series Death Note written by Tsugumi Ohba and illustrated by Takeshi Obata and is a sequel to Death Note 2: The Last Name (2006), but features an original story and takes place after the Death Note: New Generation miniseries. It premiered in Japan on October 29, 2016, by Warner Bros.

== Plot ==
Ten years after the deaths of Light Yagami/Kira and L, in a world afflicted with cyber-terrorism, a chain of unexplained deaths suggests that Death Notes are being used once more. Interpol assigns L's biological successor, Ryuzaki, to the newly established "Death Note Task Force", led by Detective Tsukuru Mishima. They quickly secure a notebook during a killing spree in Shibuya, after its owner, Sakura Aoi, is killed. Upon touching Aoi's notebook, the Task Force meets and questions its original owner – a Shinigami named Beppo – who reveals that there are six Death Notes currently in the human world; this is the maximum number that can exist there at any one time. The Task Force resolves to find the remaining five Death Notes.

Similarly, Aoi's killer – cyber-terrorist Yuki Shien – vows to acquire all the notebooks, believing he is on a mission from Light via his Shinigami, Ryuk. Inciting global panic with a virus featuring a video of Light as Kira, Shien then makes contact with Light's girlfriend and former ally, Misa Amane. After restoring her memories of Death Notes and gifting her with his, Shien asks Misa to disclose information which he believes will reveal where Light is hiding; she refuses, having watched Light seemingly die ten years ago. Undaunted, Shien uses his exceptional hacking abilities to locate three Death Notes, killing their owners in the process. He then impersonates Kira via another virus, threatening a killing spree unless L's successor reveals his name and face. In response, Ryuzaki spreads a CGI video of the original L, inviting Kira to a website intended to trick him into revealing his location. Anticipating this, Shien escapes before killing one of the original Kira investigators – Touta Matsuda. Fearing that the investigation is compromised, the Japanese government dissolves the Death Note Task Force.

Refusing to give up, Mishima finds a hidden message in Ryuzaki's video: "I own the last Death Note". Enraged, Mishima confronts Ryuzaki in his home and discovers the latter's unconventional relationship with his Shinigami, Arma. However, Ryuzaki reveals that his Death Note is blank, having promised L before his death that he would never use one. Upon leaving, Mishima is arrested on suspicion of compromising the investigation. A year prior, Mishima was tasked with locating Light's son and secret successor, (Note: The son's name is written "夜神光". While 夜神 is Yagami, the film does not state how the character "光", the boy's given name, is pronounced.) who was placed in the care of prosecutor Teru Mikami. However, both the son and Mikami had subsequently vanished, leading the police to suspect Mishima of conspiring with Kira. After Mishima is interrogated, Ryuzaki frees him so that he can access the Task Force's Death Note and confront the new Kira. Agreeing to meet Ryuzaki at the National Arts Centre, Shien again asks Misa for her help, which she reluctantly gives.

After three Task Force members return to the case, they head with Ryuzaki to meet Shien, who has been lured with the promise that Ryuzaki will reveal his face and the team's Death Notes. Mishima remains at headquarters to instruct them – however, contact is cut by a jamming signal made by Shien. Forced to reveal their faces, Three Task Force members are killed by Misa, who has acquired "Shinigami Eyes" (Which display a person's real name and lifespan above their head). Misa then gives Shien the information he needs but warns him that Light is dead; his name did not appear when she looked at her picture of him. After leaving Misa writes her name on a page of the death note, killing herself.

Realizing that the Kira who gave him his task is an impostor, Shien arrives at the secret location and sacrifices half of his life span to obtain Shinigami Eyes – deciding to kill the impostor and take his place as Neo Kira. Shien is then shocked to be confronted by Mishima and Ryuzaki; the latter suspects' Neo Kira wrote his name much earlier and specified a time of death. Ryuzaki then reveals that he believes Mishima is Neo Kira – and upon touching Shien's Death Note, Mishima remembers everything. Having witnessed Teru Mikami turn insane and murder Hikari Yagami, Mishima killed Mikami and replaced Yagami as Neo Kira. Mishima later gave up ownership of his notebook and instructed Ryuk to give it to Shien, confident that the cyber-terrorist would find the remaining Death Notes. With this new information, Shien attempts to kill Mishima, but the police arrive with orders to kill all three of them. Shien is gunned down after giving Mishima the Death Notes, allowing him and Ryuzaki to escape through an abandoned subway. They are then confronted by the last remaining Task Force member, who is killed by Arma when she attempts to shoot Mishima – at the cost of her own life, much to Ryuzaki's despair as he and Mishima are caught by the police.

Mishima and Ryuzaki's execution order is annulled by Interpol and Mishima is taken into custody. Ryuk then explains why the six Death Notes were dropped down to earth – the dying Shinigami King, intrigued by Light Yagami, has promised to give his throne to the Shinigami who finds the next Kira. When Mishima points out that all six Death Notes have been secured, Ryuk suggests that human greed will result in their use once again, and leaves. Shortly after being led to his cell, Mishima is greeted by Ryuzaki, who informs him that the vehicle containing the notebooks was attacked by terrorists, resulting in four notebooks being destroyed and the other two missing. Revealing that today is his appointed date of death, Ryuzaki suggests trading places with Mishima, as he believes that the latter is the only one who can retrieve the missing Death Notes. Accepting his new role, Mishima reveals his real name – Ryo Nakagami – and leaves Ryuzaki to die peacefully in the cell.

A post-credit scene shows a video of Light saying "Just as I planned" and ironically smiling.

== Cast and characters ==
- Masahiro Higashide as Tsukuru Mishima/Ryo Nakagami, leader of the Death Note task force, who pursues to secure all 6 death notes.
- Sosuke Ikematsu as Ryūzaki/Masayuki Arai, a world class private investigator and the original successor to L.
- Masaki Suda as Yūki Shien, a cyber-terrorist and worshiper of Kira.
- Erika Toda as Misa Amane, a former death note holder and love interest of Light Yagami.
- Rina Kawaei as Sakura Aoi, a mass murderer who believes she is better than Kira, regarded as the deadliest death note user.
- Mina Fujii as Shō Nanase/Ayana Shirato, the only female member of the Death Note task force.
- Nakamura Shidō II as Ryuk, (voice) a shinigami, who returns after 10 years to find the successor of kira.
- Sota Aoyama as Tōta Matsuda, a young detective, who experienced the Kira case 10 years ago.
- Eiichiro Funakoshi as Kenichi Mikuriya, a Supreme Court Justice in possession of a Death Note.
- Kenichi Matsuyama as L, was the greatest detective in the world, who defeated the original Kira.
- Tatsuya Fujiwara as Light Yagami, worldly known as "Kira", a serial killer of criminals and former death note holder.
- Kensei Mikami as Teru Mikami, the guardian of Light's son and Misa's prosecutor.
- Miyuki Sawashiro as Arma (voice), a white female shinigami, created based on Sidoh's design.
- Tori Matsuzaka as Beppo (voice), a golden shinigami.

== Production ==
As of February 2016 principal photography was taking place outside Japan.

Takeshi Obata, one of the original creators of Death Note, designed the new CGI Shinigami character Arma specifically for the film.

The theme song "Dear Diary" and the insert song "Fighter" is performed by Namie Amuro.

== Reception ==
=== Box office ===
The film opened on 342 screens and sold 342,309 tickets, earning 458,645,800 yen ($4.37 million) during its opening weekend., beating Your Name to Top Japan's Box Office. It was the 19th highest-grossing film of 2016 in Japan and also the 10th highest-grossing Japanese film of the year in the country (tied with A Silent Voice), with ¥2.3 billion ($19.56 million). Overseas, the film grossed $489,872, bringing its worldwide total to $20,049,872.

=== Critical response ===
Upon release, the film received a mixed reception from fans and critics alike, with praise aimed at the attempted unique and modernized take on the Death Note mythos and the performances of the cast, especially Erika Toda as Misa Amane and Nakamura Shido as Ryuk, while criticism was aimed at the rushed plot, rehashing of the original themes and elements of the previous films and the lack of the cerebral tone from the previous works.

On Rotten Tomatoes, the film received a 40% approval rating based on 5 reviews, with an average rating of 6/10.

== Miniseries ==
A three-part miniseries entitled Death Note: New Generation was announced as a part of the Death Note live-action film series. It bridges the 10-year gap between the previous films and the 2016 film.

== Light novel ==
A light novel adaptation titled Death Note: Light Up the New World Film Novelization (映画ノベライズ デスノート Light up the NEW world) was released on October 24, 2016. It was written by Masatoshi Kusakabe, based on the screenplay by Katsunari Mano. It was published by Shueisha under its Jump J-Books imprint.
