= Death Note =

Japanese manga series

- First tankōbon volume cover, featuring Light Yagami (front) and Ryuk (back)
- Genre: Mystery; Psychological thriller; Supernatural thriller
- Manga
- Written by: Tsugumi Ohba
- Illustrated by: Takeshi Obata
- Published by: Shueisha
- English publisher: AUS: Madman Entertainment; NA: Viz Media
- Imprint: Jump Comics
- Magazine: Weekly Shōnen Jump
- Original run: December 1, 2003 – May 15, 2006
- Volumes: 12
- Novel

Death Note Another Note: The Los Angeles BB Murder Cases
- Written by: Nisio Isin
- Published by: Shueisha
- English publisher: NA: Viz Media
- Published: August 1, 2006
- Novel

Death Note: L – Change the World
- Written by: M
- Published by: Shueisha
- English publisher: NA: Viz Media
- Published: December 25, 2007
- Manga

Death Note: C-Kira
- Written by: Tsugumi Ohba
- Illustrated by: Takeshi Obata
- Published by: Shueisha
- English publisher: NA: Viz Media
- Magazine: Weekly Shōnen Jump
- Published: February 9, 2008
- Manga

Death Note: a-Kira
- Written by: Tsugumi Ohba
- Illustrated by: Takeshi Obata
- Published by: Shueisha
- English publisher: NA: Viz Media
- Magazine: Jump Square
- Published: February 4, 2020
- Anime
- Death Note (2006–2007 TV series); Death Note: Relight – Visions of a God (2007 TV film); Death Note: Relight 2 – L's Successors (2008 TV film)
- Live-action
- Death Note (2006 film); Death Note 2: The Last Name (2006 film); L: Change the World (2008 film); Death Note (2015 TV drama); Death Note: The Musical (2015 musical); Death Note: New Generation (2016 miniseries); Death Note: Light Up the New World (2016 film); Death Note (2017 film)
- Video games
- Death Note: Kira Game (2007); Death Note: Successors to L (2007); L the Prologue to Death Note: Spiraling Trap (2008); Death Note: Killer Within (2024)
- icon

Death Note (stylized in all caps) is a Japanese manga series written by Tsugumi Ohba and illustrated by Takeshi Obata. It was serialized in Shueisha's shōnen manga magazine Weekly Shōnen Jump from December 2003 to May 2006, with its chapters collected in 12 tankōbon volumes. The story follows Light Yagami, a genius high school student who discovers a mysterious notebook, the Death Note. This notebook belonged to the shinigami Ryuk, and writing someone’s name in the pages leads to their death. The series centers on Light's use of the Death Note to carry out a worldwide massacre of individuals he deems immoral in an attempt to create a crime-free society, using the alias of a god-like vigilante named Kira. This leads to the efforts of an elite Japanese police task force, led by the enigmatic detective L, to apprehend him.

A 37-episode anime television series adaptation, produced by Madhouse and directed by Tetsurō Araki, was broadcast on Nippon Television from October 2006 to June 2007. A light novel based on the series, written by Nisio Isin, was released in 2006. Various Death Note video games have been published by Konami for the Nintendo DS. The series was adapted into three live-action films released in Japan in June, November 2006, and February 2008, and a television drama in 2015. The miniseries Death Note: New Generation and a fourth film were released in 2016. An American film adaptation was released exclusively on Netflix in August 2017, and a series is reportedly in the works. Two one-shot manga sequels, C-Kira and a-Kira, were published in 2008 and 2020; they were later collected in a single volume, Death Note: Short Stories, alongside other standalone stories, in 2021. An online social deduction game, Death Note: Killer Within, was released by Bandai Namco Entertainment for the PlayStation 5, PlayStation 4, and Windows via Steam in 2024.

Death Note media, except for video games and soundtracks, is licensed and released in North America by Viz Media. The live-action films briefly showed in certain North American theaters in 2008 before receiving home video releases. By April 2015, the Death Note manga had over 30 million copies in circulation, making it one of the best-selling manga series.

== Plot ==
In Tokyo, brilliant yet disaffected high school student Light Yagami finds the "Death Note", a mysterious black notebook with rules that can end anyone's life in seconds if their name is written in it, as long as the writer knows both the target's true name and face. Light uses the notebook to kill high-profile criminals and is visited by Ryuk, a shinigami and the Death Note's original owner. Ryuk, invisible to anyone who has not touched the notebook, reveals that he dropped the notebook into the human world out of boredom and is amused by Light's actions.

Global media suggest that a single mastermind is responsible for the mysterious murders and name them "Kira" (キラ; the Japanese transliteration of the word "killer"). Interpol requests the assistance of the enigmatic detective L to assist in their investigation. L tricks Light into revealing that he is in the Kanto region of Japan by manipulating him to kill a decoy. Light vows to kill L, whom he views as obstructing his plans. L deduces that Kira has inside knowledge of the Japanese police investigation, led by Light's father, Soichiro Yagami. L assigns a team of FBI agents to monitor the families of those connected with the investigation and designates Light as the prime suspect. Light graduates from high school to college. L recruits Light into the Kira Task Force.

Actress-model Misa Amane obtains a second Death Note from a shinigami named Rem and makes a deal for shinigami eyes, which reveal the names of anyone whose face she sees, at the cost of half her remaining lifespan. Deeply admiring Kira and seeking him to become her boyfriend, Misa uncovers Kira's identity as Light. Light uses Misa's love for him to manipulate her into discovering L's true name with her shinigami eyes. L deduces that Misa is likely the second Kira and detains her. Rem threatens to kill Light if he does not find a way to save Misa. Light arranges a scheme in which he and Misa temporarily lose their memories of the Death Note, and has Rem pass the Death Note to Kyosuke Higuchi of the Yotsuba Group.

With memories of the Death Note erased, Light joins the investigation and, together with L, deduces Higuchi's identity and arrests him. Light regains his memories and uses the Death Note to kill Higuchi and regain possession of the book. After restoring Misa's memories, Light instructs her to begin killing as Kira, causing L to suspect Misa. Rem realizes Light's plan to have Misa sacrifice herself to kill L. After Rem kills L, she disintegrates and Light obtains her Death Note. The task force agrees to have Light operate as the new L. The investigation stalls but crime rates continue to drop.

Five years later, cults worshiping Kira have risen. L's potential successors are introduced: Near and Mello. Mello joins the mafia whilst Near joins forces with the US government. Mello kidnaps Director Takimura, who is killed by Light. Mello kidnaps Light's sister and exchanges her for the Death Note, using it to kill almost all of Near's team. A shinigami named Sidoh goes to Earth to reclaim his notebook and ends up meeting and helping Mello. Light uses the notebook to find Mello's hideout, but Soichiro is killed in the mission. Mello and Near exchange information; Mello kidnaps Mogi and gives him to Near. Kira's supporters attack Near's group, but they escape. Shuichi Aizawa, one of the task force members, becomes suspicious of Light and meets with Near. As suspicion falls again on Misa, Light passes Misa's Death Note to Teru Mikami, a fervent Kira supporter, and appoints newscaster Kiyomi Takada as Kira's public spokesperson. Near has Mikami followed whilst Aizawa's suspicions are confirmed. Realizing that Takada is connected to Kira, Mello kidnaps her. Takada kills Mello but is then killed by Light. Near arranges a meeting between Light and the current Kira Task Force members. Light tries to have Mikami kill Near as well as all the task force members, but Mikami's Death Note fails to work, having been replaced with a decoy. Near proves Light is Kira by discovering Mikami had not written down Light's name. Light is severely wounded in a scuffle and begs Ryuk to write the names of everyone present. Ryuk instead writes down Light's name in his Death Note, as he had promised to do the day they met, and Light dies.

One year later, the world has returned to normal, and the task force members are conflicted over whether they made the right decision. Meanwhile, cults continue to worship Kira.

=== C-Kira (one-shot sequel) ===
Three years later, Near, now functioning as the new L, receives word that a new Kira has appeared. Hearing that the new Kira is randomly killing people, Near concludes that the new Kira is an attention-seeker and denounces the new Kira as "boring" and not worth catching. A shinigami named Midora approaches Ryuk and gives him an apple from the human realm, in a bet to see if a random human could become the new Kira, but Midora loses the bet when the human writes his own name in the Death Note after hearing Near's announcement. Ryuk tells Midora that no human would ever surpass Light as the new Kira.

=== a-Kira (one-shot sequel) ===
Another ten years later, Ryuk returns to Earth and gives the Death Note to Minoru Tanaka, the top-scoring student in Japan, hoping that he will follow in Light Yagami's footsteps. On explaining the rules to Minoru, Ryuk is surprised when he returns the notebook and tells him to return it and his memory of their encounter to him in two years' time. Two years later, Minoru receives the notebook back from Ryuk. Minoru reveals that he has no plans to use it himself. Instead, he plans to auction it off to the governments of the world, with Ryuk's help sending his offer out as "a-Kira", having waited two years until he was old enough to have a bank account to allow his plan to work. Elsewhere, Near (as L) is revealed to be developing technology meant to track Shinigami, although it is not yet advanced enough to be useful. After selling the Death Note to U.S. president Donald Trump (Note: The text does not call him Trump, though Hannah Collins of Comic Book Resources stated "the uncanny likeness to the divisive political figure is hard to miss.") for a sum that would ensure every Japanese citizen under the age of 60 would be financially set for life, Minoru relinquishes his ownership and memory of his plan to Ryuk, assuring his own anonymity. Trump is left unable to use the Death Note after the King of Death creates a new rule disallowing the Death Note to be sold, and he secretly returns it to Ryuk. Minoru collapses to the ground in the bank after withdrawing his savings. It is revealed that Ryuk wrote his name in the Death Note next to Light's. He longs for a human who will use the notebook for a longer period of time.

== Production ==
=== Development ===
The Death Note concept derived from a rather general idea involving shinigami and "specific rules". Author Tsugumi Ohba felt that they would not be able to create a conventional fight-style manga for Weekly Shōnen Jump, so they preferred to develop a suspense-type conflict manga instead. After the publication of the pilot chapter, the series was not expected to receive approval for serialization. Eventually, upon learning that Death Note had received approval and that Takeshi Obata would illustrate the artwork, Ohba said they "couldn't even believe it". Due to positive reactions, Death Note became a serialized manga series.

"Thumbnails" incorporating dialogue, panel layout and basic drawings were created, reviewed by an editor and sent to Obata, and with the script finalized and the panel layout "mostly done". Obata then determined the expressions and "camera angles" and created the final artwork. Ohba concentrated on the tempo and the amount of dialogue, making the text as concise as possible. Ohba commented that "reading too much exposition" would be tiring and would negatively affect the atmosphere and "air of suspense". Obata had significant artistic license to interpret basic descriptions, such as "abandoned building", as well as the design of the Death Notes themselves. When Ohba was deciding on the plot, they visualized the panels while relaxing on their bed, drinking tea, or walking around their house. Often the original draft was too long and needed to be refined to finalize the desired "tempo" and "flow". The writer remarked on their preference for reading the previous "two or four" chapters carefully to ensure consistency in the story.

The typical weekly production schedule consisted of five days of creating and thinking and one day using a pencil to insert dialogue into rough drafts; after this point, the writer faxed any initial drafts to the editor. The illustrator's weekly production schedule involved one day with the thumbnails, layout, and pencils and one day for additional penciling and inking. Obata's assistants usually worked for four days and Obata spent one day to finish the artwork. Obata said that when he took a few extra days to color the pages, it "messed with the schedule". In contrast, the writer took three or four days to create a chapter on some occasions, while on others they took a month. Obata said that his schedule remained consistent except when he had to create color pages.

Ohba and Obata rarely met in person during the serialization of the manga; instead, the two met with and communicated through their editor. The first time they met in person was at an editorial party in January 2004. Obata said that, despite the intrigue, he did not ask his editor about Ohba's plot developments as he anticipated the new thumbnails every week. The two did not discuss the final chapters with one another and continued talking only with their editor. Ohba said that when they asked the editor if Obata had "said anything" about the story and plot, the editor responded: "No, nothing".

Ohba claims that the series ended more or less in the manner that they intended for it to end; they considered the idea of L defeating Light and the latter dying, but instead chose to use the "Yellow Box Warehouse" ending. According to Ohba, the details had been set "from the beginning". The writer wanted an ongoing plot line instead of an episodic series because Death Note was serialized and its focus was intended to be on a cast with a series of events triggered by the Death Note. 13: How to Read states that the humorous aspects of Death Note originated from Ohba's "enjoyment of humorous stories".

When Ohba was asked, during an interview, whether the series was meant to be about enjoying the plot twists and psychological warfare, Ohba responded by saying that this concept was the reason why they were "very happy" to have the story in Weekly Shōnen Jump.

=== Concepts ===
==== The Death Notes ====
The core plot device of the story is the "Death Note" itself, a black notebook with instructions written on the inside. When used correctly, it allows anyone, anywhere, to instantly commit a murder, provided they know the victim's name and face. According to the director of the live-action films, Shusuke Kaneko, "The idea of spirits living in words is an ancient Japanese concept... in a way, it's a very Japanese story".

Artist Takeshi Obata originally thought of the books as "something you would automatically think was a Death Note". Deciding that this design would be cumbersome, he instead opted for a more accessible college notebook. Death Notes were originally conceived as changing based on time and location, resembling scrolls in ancient Japan, or the Old Testament in medieval Europe. However, this idea was never used.

==== Themes ====
Ohba had no particular themes in mind for Death Note. When pushed, they suggested: "Humans will all eventually die, so let's give it our all while we're alive". In a 2012 paper, author Jolyon Baraka Thomas characterised Death Note as a psychological thriller released in the wake of the 1995 Tokyo subway sarin attack, saying that it examines the human tendency to express itself through "horrific" cults.

=== Pilot chapter ===
The Death Note process began when Ohba brought thumbnails for two concept ideas to Shueisha; Ohba said that the Death Note pilot, one of the concepts, was "received well" by editors and attained positive reactions from readers. Ohba described keeping the story of the pilot to one chapter as "very difficult", declaring that it took over a month to begin writing the chapter. He added that the story had to revive the killed characters with the Death Eraser and that he "didn't really care" for that plot device.

Obata said that he wanted to draw the story after he heard of a "horror story featuring shinigami". According to Obata, when he first received the rough draft created by Ohba, he "didn't really get it" at first, and he wanted to work on the project due to the presence of shinigami and because the work "was dark". He also said he wondered about the progression of the plot as he read the thumbnails, and if Jump readers would enjoy reading the comic. Obata said that while there is little action and the main character "doesn't really drive the plot", he enjoyed the atmosphere of the story. He stated that he drew the pilot chapter so that it would appeal to himself.

Ohba brought the rough draft of the pilot chapter to the editorial department. Obata eventually joined forces with Ohba create the artwork. They did not meet in person while creating the pilot chapter. Ohba said that their editor told him he did not need to meet with Obata to discuss the pilot; Ohba said "I think it worked out all right".

== Media ==
=== Manga ===
Death Note, written by Tsugumi Ohba and illustrated by Takeshi Obata, was serialized in Shueisha's shōnen manga magazine Weekly Shōnen Jump from December 1, 2003, to May 15, 2006. (Note: It finished in the magazine's 24th issue of 2006 (cover date May 29), released on May 15 of that same year.) Its 108 chapters were collected into twelve tankōbon volumes by Shueisha, released from April 2, 2004, to July 4, 2006. A one-shot chapter, titled "C-Kira" (Cキラ編, C-Kira-hen) ("Death Note: Special One-Shot"), was published in Weekly Shōnen Jump on February 9, 2008. Set two years after the manga's epilogue, it sees the introduction of a new Kira and the reactions of the main characters in response to the copycat's appearance. Several Death Note yonkoma (four-panel comics) appeared in Akamaru Jump. The yonkoma was written to be humorous. The Akamaru Jump issues that printed the comics include 2004 Spring, 2004 Summer, 2005 Winter, and 2005 Spring. In addition Weekly Shōnen Jump Gag Special 2005 included some Death Note yonkoma in a Jump Heroes Super 4-Panel Competition. Shueisha re-released the series in seven bunkoban volumes from March 18 to August 19, 2014. On October 4, 2016, all 12 original manga volumes and the February 2008 one-shot were released in a single All-in-One Edition, consisting of 2,400 pages in a single book.

In April 2005, Viz Media announced that they had licensed the series for English release in North America. The twelve volumes were released from October 10, 2005, to July 3, 2007. The manga was re-released in a six-volume omnibus edition, dubbed "Black Edition". The volumes were released from December 28, 2010, to November 1, 2011. The All-in-One Edition was released in English on September 6, 2017, resulting in the February 2008 one-shot being released in English for the first time.

In addition, a guidebook for the manga was also released on October 13, 2006. It was named Death Note 13: How to Read and contained information relating to the series, including character profiles of almost every character that is named, creator interviews, behind the scenes info for the series and the pilot chapter that preceded Death Note. It also reprinted all of the yonkoma published in Akamaru Jump and the Weekly Shōnen Jump Gag Special 2005. In North America, 13: How to Read was released on February 19, 2008.

In the June 2019 issue of Shueisha's Jump Square, it was announced that a new one-shot chapter of Death Note would be published. Part of the complete manuscript debuted at the "30th Work Anniversary Takeshi Obata Exhibition: Never Complete" event which ran in Tokyo from July 13 to August 12, 2019. Titled "Death Note: Special One-Shot", the entire 87-page chapter was published in Jump Square on February 4, 2020, and on Viz Media's website. A collected volume titled Death Note: Short Stories (DEATH NOTE短編集, Desu Nōto Tanpenshū), which includes the "C-Kira" one-shot chapter, the "Special One-Shot" (re-titled "a-Kira" (aキラ編, a-Kira-hen), the series's pilot chapter, the "L: The Wammy's House" and "L: One Day" one-shot chapters and the yonkoma, was released on February 4, 2021. The volume was published in English by Viz Media on May 10, 2022.

=== Light novels ===
A light novel adaptation of the series has been written by Nisio Isin, called Death Note Another Note: The Los Angeles BB Murder Cases. The novel was released by Shueisha on August 1, 2006. It serves as a prequel to the manga series, with Mello narrating the story of L's first encounter with Naomi Misora during the Los Angeles "BB Serial Murder Case" mentioned in volume 2 of the manga. Besides Naomi's character, the novel focuses on how L works and one of the criminals L has to chase down. Insight was given into Watari's orphanage and how the whole system of geniuses such as L, Mello, Beyond Birthday, Matt and Near were put to work. Viz released the novel in English on February 19, 2008. The film L: Change the World was also adapted into a light novel with the same name on December 25, 2007, by "M". While the novel is similar to the film, there are many significant changes to the plot (for example, Near is not a Thai boy, but the same Near that appears in the manga). It also reveals more information about L and his past. Viz released it on October 20, 2009.

=== Anime ===
A 37-episode anime television series, directed by Tetsurō Araki and animated by Madhouse, premiered on Nippon TV on October 4, 2006, and finished its run on June 27, 2007.

=== Live-action films ===
Death Note was adapted into a series of live action films in 2006. The first two films were directed by Shusuke Kaneko and the third was directed by Hideo Nakata and produced by Nippon Television, CG production of all three films were done by Digital Frontier and distributed by Warner Bros. Pictures Japan. The first film, simply titled Death Note, premiered in Japan on June 17, 2006, and topped the Japanese box office for two weeks, pushing The Da Vinci Code into second place. The first film briefly played in certain North American theaters on May 20–21, 2008. The film was broadcast in Canadian theaters for one night only on September 15, 2008. The DVD was released on September 16, 2008, one day after the Canadian showing. The sequel, Death Note 2: The Last Name, premiered in Japan on November 3, 2006. It was featured in U.S. theaters in October 2008.

A spin-off from the films named L: Change the World was released in Japan on February 9, 2008. It is focused on the final 23 days of L's life, as he solves one final case involving a bio-terrorist group. Two dubbed versions of the film were shown in the United States on April 29 and 30, 2009. In August 2016, a three-part miniseries entitled Death Note: New Generation was announced as a part of the Death Note live-action film series and aired in September. It bridges the 10-year gap between the previous films and the then-upcoming 2016 film. A fourth Japanese Death Note film was released in 2016 and featured a cyber-terrorism setting with the inclusion of six Death Notes brought into the human world. An American adaptation was released on Netflix on August 25, 2017. The film was directed by Adam Wingard and was written by Charles Parlapanides, Vlas Parlapanides, and Jeremy Slater. It starred Nat Wolff, Lakeith Stanfield, Margaret Qualley, Shea Whigham, Paul Nakauchi, Jason Liles, and Willem Dafoe. A sequel film is reportedly in the works.

=== Live-action series ===
In April 2015, it was announced that a live action television series based on Death Note manga would begin airing from July 2015 on Nippon TV. Masataka Kubota stars as Light Yagami and Kento Yamazaki as L in the series.

In July 2022, it was announced that the Duffer Brothers recently founded Upside Down Pictures production company would be producing a new live-action series adaptation for Netflix. In October 2022, it was announced that Halia Abdel-Meguid was brought on to write and executive produce the series.

=== Video games ===
A Death Note video game developed and published by Konami for the Nintendo DS, titled Death Note: Kira Game (デスノート キラゲーム, Desu Nōto Kira Gēmu), was released on February 15, 2007. Kira Game is a strategy game where the player takes on the role of Kira or L. These are just titles, as any character can be Kira or L. The player will attempt to deduce who their enemy is (Kira will try to uncover L's identity and vice versa). This will play out in three phases: investigation, where the player will discuss the case and clues with other characters; voting, where each member of the investigation team casts a vote on who they suspect is L or Kira based on the player's performance in the previous phase; L/Kira, where the player can either focus their investigation on one member to see if they are Kira (L part), or force a member off of the team (Kira part). A sequel to the game, Death Note: Successors to L (デスノート Lを継ぐ者, Desu Nōto Eru o Tsugu Mono), was released in Japan on July 12, 2007. The storyline is based on the second part of the manga, featuring characters such as Mello and Near.

A third game, L the Prologue to Death Note: Spiraling Trap (L the proLogue to DEATH NOTE -螺旋の罠-, L the proLogue to DEATH NOTE -Rasen no Wana-), was released for the Nintendo DS in Japan on February 7, 2008. The player assumes the role of a rookie FBI agent who awakens in a strange hotel and attempts to escape with the help of L, who provides assistance via an in-game PDA. The story is set before the Kira investigation in the original series. Several characters from Death Note appear in Jump Super Stars and Jump Ultimate Stars, a fighting game featuring multiple characters from Weekly Shōnen Jump titles. Light, Ryuk, and L appear in Jump Super Stars as support characters. Misa, Near, and Mello are added as support characters in Jump Ultimate Stars as well. The 2019 video game Jump Force features Light and Ryuk as non-playable characters, playing a key role in the game's story mode.

An online social deduction game, titled Death Note: Killer Within, was released by Bandai Namco Entertainment for the PlayStation 5, PlayStation 4, and Windows via Steam on November 5, 2024. In the game, up to ten players are split into two teams—Kira and his followers and L and the police investigation team. Kira's team aims to kill all its target with the Death Note and L's team must seize and dispose of the Death Note. Both teams try to uncover the identities of the opposing players. The players are represented by pawns, akin to those used by Near in the original series. An update, which includes a role as Mello, was released in January 2025, and another update, including the roles of Watari and Soichiro Yagami, was released in March of that same year.

=== Musical ===
In 2015, a musical adaptation of the manga called Death Note: The Musical ran in both Japan and South Korea. It was originally composed in English by Broadway composer Frank Wildhorn, with lyrics by Jack Murphy and book by Ivan Menchell. The original Japanese production, produced by Japanese talent agency HoriPro, ran from 6 to April 29, 2015, and stars Kenji Urai and Hayato Kakizawa double-cast as Light Yagami, and Teppei Koike as L. A Korean production of the same musical ran from June 11 to August 11, 2015, in South Korea, starring musical actor Hong Kwang-ho and JYJ member and musical actor Kim Junsu.

An English concert production was held at the London Palladium for two nights on August 21 and 22, 2023, directed by Nick Winston starring Joaquin Pedro Valdes as Light, Dean John-Wilson as L and Frances Mayli McCann as Misa. This would be followed by a fully staged production running 50 performances at London's Barbican Centre from July 30 to September 12, 2026, again directed by Winston and starring Xander Pang as Light, Colin Ryan as L, Stephanie Zaharis as Misa, and Telly Leung as Ryuk.

== Reception ==
=== Manga ===
By April 2015, the Death Note manga had over 30 million copies in circulation. On ICv2's "Top 10 Shonen Properties Q2 2009", Death Note was the third best-selling manga in North America. The series ranked second on Takarajimasha's Kono Manga ga Sugoi! list of best manga of 2006 and 2007 for male readers. It was nominated for the 38th Seiun Awards in the Best Comic category in 2007. The manga received the Grand Prize for Best Manga and Best Screenplay at the Japan Expo Awards 2007. The series won the 2008 Eagle Award for Favourite Manga as voted by UK fans. According to a survey conducted in 2007 by the ministry of culture of Japan, Death Note occupied the tenth place among the best manga of all time. It also received several nominations, such as Best Manga at the 2006 American Anime Awards, the 2007 Tezuka Osamu Cultural Prize, an Official Selection at Angoulême International Comics Festival 2008, and Obata was nominated for Best Penciller/Inker at the 2008 Eisner Awards. In 2007, the first three volumes of Death Note appeared on the American Library Association's 2007 Great Graphic Novels for Teens Top Ten list.

Douglas Wolk of Salon said that a rumor circulated stating that the creators intended to have Death Note to last half as long as its actual run and Ohba and Obata had been persuaded to lengthen the storyline when Death Note's popularity increased, noting that the rumor "makes sense, since about halfway through the series, there's a point that seems like a natural ending". In addition, he said that fans wrote "thousands" of Death Note fan fiction stories and posted them on the internet. In 2006, Japanese fans pointed out the similarities between Death Note and the 1973 one-shot manga The Miraculous Notebook (不思議な手帖) by Shigeru Mizuki. Comipress reported that the only difference between the story and Death Note is that there are no shinigamis.

Anime News Network writer Zac Bertschy called Death Note a "surprisingly gripping and original suspense tale that raises a handful of interesting questions about morality". He noted that the difference between the series and other manga from the same demographic was very notable due to the murders the main character commits as well as how he hides his identity of Kira. Although Bertschy mentioned some manga readers will be surprised with the dark themes of Death Note, he praised the series for its "great art, great story, [and] compelling characters". Briana Lawrence from the same website stated that what makes Death Note so interesting is that there is no villain; "instead it had two opposing sides that both believe in the same thing: justice". She felt that once vital characters fading into the background, the ending brings back what the fans loved about the first volume and the supporting cast are "given a chance to shine". She also mentioned that the epilogue made no mention of what happens with Misa Amane and how Near and Mello were still treated like parts of L. Julie Rosato from Mania Entertainment found the story to be very entertaining, having liked Light's development in the story and L's introduction, as well as how the latter starts suspecting the former's identity. Additionally, she praised the story as it was "building a climax" with each detail introduced in the first chapter, making the reader look forward to upcoming chapters. Jolyon Baraka Thomas, in a Japanese Journal of Religious Studies article, describes the manga as having a "somber narrative" with a "dark cast". Obata's art is "[rendered] in stark strokes characterized---fittingly---by a complex interplay of light and shadow".

=== Light novels ===
A.E. Sparrow of IGN reviewed the novel Another Note and gave it a 9.5 out of 10. Sparrow said that the author understood "what made these characters click so well" and that it "captures everything that made the manga the compelling read that it is". Sparrow said that fans of Death Note who read Another Note will "find a welcome home" in Nisio Isin's work, which "adds a few more fun layers" to the Death Note franchise. The novelization of L: Change the World became the second top-selling light novel in Japan in 2008.

== Legacy and controversies ==
The series release outside Japan has inspired other works, as well as individuals making their own mock "Death Notes", including one that was associated with a real-life murder. According to Wired magazine, Death Note "[turned] Japan's most-popular print medium into an internationally controversial topic that has parents wondering whether they should prohibit their kids from reading manga entirely". Live-action director Shusuke Kaneko commented in response, "If preventing them from seeing this movie is going to make kids better, then why not prevent them from watching all bad news?"

In regard to the 2019 The Twilight Zone episode "The Comedian", Rosie Knight of The Hollywood Reporter stated that Samir's story appears to take a large influence from Death Note. The Simpsons has parodied Death Note in both comic books and animation with the 2008 comic book story "Murder, He Wrote" in The Simpsons Treehouse of Horror #14, where Bart receives the notebook from the Ryuk-ified ghost of Krusty the Clown, and the "Death Tome" segment of the 2022 television episode "Treehouse of Horror XXXIII", with Lisa receiving the titular book.

=== Bans and attempted bans ===
Early in 2005, school officials in Shenyang, the capital of Liaoning, China banned Death Note. The reason was that students had been altering notebooks to resemble Death Notes and then writing the names of acquaintances, enemies, and teachers in the books. The ban was designed to protect the "physical and mental health" of students from horror material that "misleads innocent children and distorts their mind and spirit". Jonathan Clements has suggested that the Chinese authorities acted partly against "superstition", but also against illegal, pirate publishers of Death Note. The ban has been extended to other Chinese cities including Beijing, Shanghai and Lanzhou in Gansu Province. Legally published Chinese-language versions of Death Note are published in Hong Kong. On June 12, 2015, the Chinese Ministry of Culture listed Death Note among 38 anime and manga titles banned in the country.

In 2007, the education bureau in Pingtung County, Taiwan asked teachers to pay attention to any negative influence on elementary school students reading the manga. In May 2010, the Albuquerque Public Schools school district in New Mexico, United States, held a hearing to ban the Death Note manga from their district's schools; it was unanimously voted down. After volumes of Death Note were found at the February 2013 suicide of a 15-year-old girl in Yekaterinburg, Russia, a local parents' group began campaigning to regulate all media based on the series, saying that it had an adverse effect on the minds of children. In March 2014, investigators concluded that the manga did not cause the girl to commit suicide.

=== Imitations of the series ===
Typical design of a Death Note

There have been various imitations around the world of the premise of Death Note, and at least one instance was linked to a crime; on September 28, 2007, two notes written with Latin characters stating "Watashi wa Kira dess", one transliteration of "I am Kira" (私はキラです, Watashi wa Kira desu), were found near the partial remains of a white male in Belgium. The case has been called the "Mangamoord" (Dutch for Manga Murder) in Belgian media. It was not until 2010 that four people were arrested in connection to the murder. A senior at the Franklin Military Academy in Richmond, Virginia, United States was suspended in 2007 after being caught possessing a replica "Death Note" notebook with the names of fellow students. The school's principal wrote a letter to the student's parents linking to an unofficial website where visitors can write names and circumstances of death for people they want to die.

In South Carolina in March 2008, school officials seized a "Death Note" notebook from a Hartsville Middle School student. District officials linked the notebook to the anime/manga. The notebook listed seven students' names. The school planned a disciplinary hearing and contacted the seven students' parents. In Gadsden, Alabama in April 2008, two sixth-grade boys were arrested for possession of a "Death Note" that listed names of several staff members and fellow students. According to Etowah County Sheriff's Department Sgt. Lanny Handy, the notebook was discovered the previous afternoon by a staffer. The students were suspended from the county's schools, pending a juvenile court hearing. The students, their parents, and school officials had met with Handy and a junior probation officer. In Gig Harbor, Washington, one middle school student was expelled and three were suspended on May 14, 2008, for having 50 names in their own "Death Note" book, including President George W. Bush.

In December 2009, two students at an elementary school in Oklahoma were disciplined for a "Death Note" with the names and descriptions of deaths of two girls that had angered them. A Michigan middle school student was suspended indefinitely in March 2010 for possessing a "Death Note". In May 2010, a middle school student in the Avonworth School District in Pennsylvania was suspended for owning a "Death Note" with names of fellow students and pop singer Justin Bieber. In February 2015, a fifth-grade student of an elementary school near Pittsburgh was suspended for owning a "Death Note" and writing other students' names in it.

== See also ==
- Now: Zero, a short story by J. G. Ballard with a similar premise to Death Note
- "Obits", a short story by Stephen King with a similar premise to Death Note
