= Hinako Sano =

Japanese actress, model, and gravure idol (born 1994)

- 佐野 ひなこ
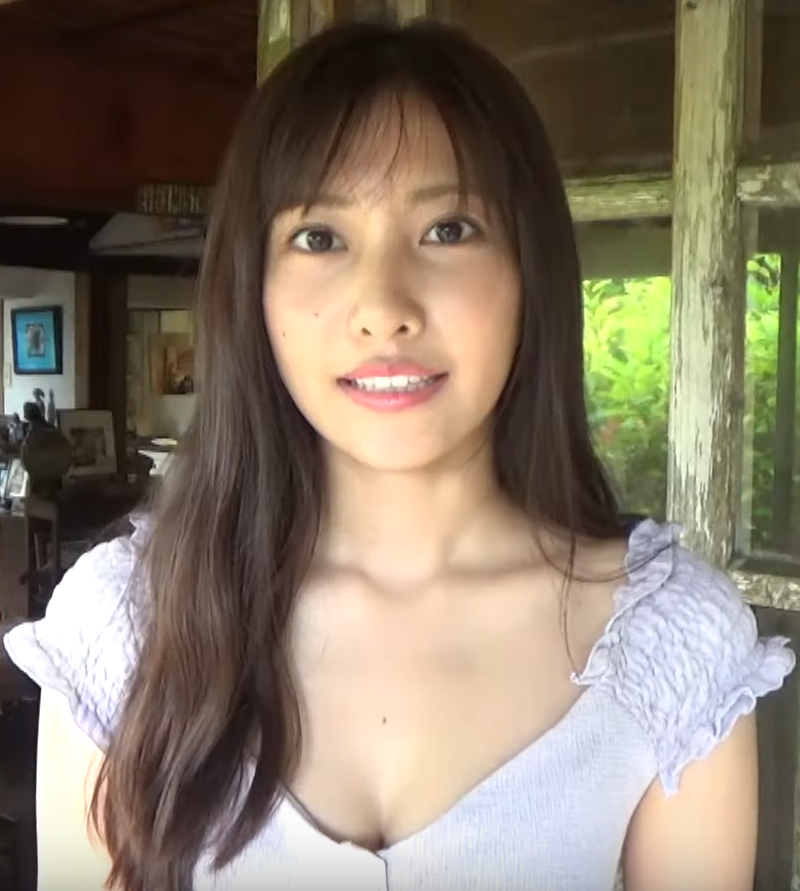
- Sano in August 2019
- Born: October 13, 1994 (age 31); Suginami-ku, Tokyo, Japan
- Occupations: Actress; model; gravure idol
- Years active: 2013–present
- Agent: Horipro

Hinako Sano (佐野 ひなこ, Sano Hinako; born October 13, 1994, in Tokyo, Japan) is a Japanese actress, model, and gravure idol who is affiliated with Horipro.

== Career ==
Before becoming an actress, Sano was a magazine model. She appeared in the photo collection Hare Nochi Tsuintēru, and served as a model in After School Tails. She was nominated in the Horipro Scout Caravan 2012 contest. Although Sano missed the Grand Prix, she was associated with Horipro.

In March 2013, she graduated from Tama University Meguro High School. In April, Sano went on to attend a university.

On July 13, 2013, she appeared in Weekly Young Magazine (Kodansha) which marked her debut in gravure. In August 2014, Sano became an exclusive Beauty Muse of Vivi.

== Filmography ==
=== TV series ===
Year	Title	Role	Network	Other notes	Ref(s)
2014	A Perfect Day for Love Letters	Meike	NTV	Episode 9	
2014	Akumu-chan	Ikumi Murano	NTV	Special	
2014	Water Polo Yankees	Riko Shibata	Fuji TV		
2014	Hell Teacher Nūbē	Miki Hosokawa	NTV		
2015	Death Note	Misa Amane	NTV		
2020	A Warmed Up Love	Yuriko Ishihara	TBS		
2021	My Fair Prince	Mari Obara	Fuji TV		
