= L (Death Note) =

Fictional character from Death Note

L Lawliet
- Death Note character
- L, drawn by Takeshi Obata
- First appearance: Chapter 1: "Boredom" (退屈, Taikutsu) (2004)
- Last appearance: Chapter 58: "Feelings Within" (胸中, Kyōchū) (2005)
- Created by: Tsugumi Ohba; Takeshi Obata
- Portrayed by: Kenichi Matsuyama (films); Kento Yamazaki (TV series); Teppei Koike (musical); LaKeith Stanfield (American film)
- Voiced by: Kappei Yamaguchi (Japanese, anime); Shin-ichiro Miki (Japanese dub, 2017 Netflix film); Alessandro Juliani (English)

In-universe information
- Full name: L Lawliet (manga and anime); Lebensborn Atubia (American film) (Pronounced 'L Law-Lee-et'
- Aliases: Ryuzaki (竜崎, Ryūzaki); Hideki Ryuga (流河 旱樹, Ryūga Hideki); Lind L. Tailor; Zeus (ゼウス, Zeus); Eraldo Coil; Deneuve; L-Prime (in L: Change the World); Yoshio Anderson (in the TV drama)
- Relatives: Watari (handler)

L Lawliet (Japanese: エル・ローライト, Hepburn: Eru Rōraito), also known mononymously as L, Hideki Ryuga, and Ryuzaki, is the main antagonist of the manga series Death Note, created by Tsugumi Ohba and Takeshi Obata. He is an enigmatic, mysterious, and highly esteemed international consulting detective whose true identity and background is kept a secret. He communicates with law enforcement agencies only through his equally inexplicable handler/assistant, Watari, who serves as his official liaison with the authorities. Though his past is shrouded in mystery, he has gained a reputation as arguably the world's greatest detective.

Throughout the series, he observes and investigates the activities of the protagonist, Light Yagami, a high school genius. L attempts to expose and prosecute Light as the serial killer "Kira", who is responsible for killing criminals worldwide through supernatural means using a "Death Note". At the same time, he works to stop the killings and limit Kira's actions, acting as a direct counterforce to him. As the series progresses, the psychological conflict between L and Light intensifies, as each attempts to uncover the other's identity through increasingly complex strategies. L serves as an ideological and visual foil to Light.

== Creation and conception ==
Tsugumi Ohba, the writer of the series, created L as a young adult, since he believed the story would not hold much interest if L were significantly older than his opponent, Light. For L's name, he wanted to use a single letter with a lot of significance; he considered "I" and "J", but eventually chose "L" after careful consideration. Ohba left most of L's character design to manga artist Takeshi Obata. Obata asked Ohba if L should be "unattractive". Afterwards Ohba included ideas in his thumbnails, including L's manner of sitting, "he's part English", and "he's listless". Ohba added details regarding L's mannerisms and his interests in sweets. Ohba credits Obata for the character designs. Obata commented that L's thumbnails by Ohba had no bags under his eyes, and that he had a "plain face with no expression" which was very useful. Obata drew L as an "attractive young man" until chapter 11, when the character appeared in person. After chapter 11, Obata and Ohba agreed to contrast his appearance with Light's.

During the development of the early manga chapters, Obata feared L would appear "so suspicious that Light would know instantly it was L if they ever met". When Obata's editor told him that he wanted L to have a face "looking cool based on the angle", Obata added black bags under L's eyes. Obata cited Devilman's Akira Fudou when stating that he believed that black bags were appealing. In addition, Obata thought of a "dead eyes" concept, which involved L having "all-black eyes" and "mostly no eyebrows". Obata believes that black eyes usually makes a character goofier, but the bags "sharpen the character's gaze". Obata believes that the design evokes "a feeling of mystery" and that the reader cannot determine L's true thoughts. Obata also said that the bags under L's eyes were useful for inspiring speculation about his lifestyle and background. The outfit Obata designed for L was a "simple" white, long-sleeved shirt and jeans, to convey that L does not put thought into choosing his clothing. In Death Note 13: How to Read, Ohba presented an initial rough draft of L and said that, with a "cool expression" and without the bags under his eyes, L looked like a different person.

Obata stated that the peculiar traits exhibited by L are best revealed "gradually". Obata added that if he drew L eating "mountains of sweets" before revealing his face, he would not have "much credibility as a super detective" and people would ask if he was "crazy". Both Ohba and Obata chose L as their favorite character from the series, with the former noting him as the "strongest" character in the series besides Light, and the latter due to "appearance, personality, everything". Obata said that he could never have created a character like L and that he enjoyed drawing him. Obata added that because of this, L was not "real" to him and that he liked that aspect of the character.

L's fighting style has been described as similar to capoeira. However, Obata has denied considering this when drawing L's fights, saying that he was thinking of the most effective way to kick someone whilst handcuffed. He added that if the style resembles capoeira, then this "adds another element to it" and "that makes me happy". When designing color illustrations, Obata assigned specific colors to the main characters to help "get the atmosphere right"; gold was assigned to L.

In the process of adapting L into the anime, several plot elements were added to flesh out L's human aspects. Kappei Yamaguchi, L's voice actor, specifically requested certain lines be added to emphasize L's vulnerable side, especially in regard to his relationship with his handler and father figure, Watari. L's rivalry and potential desire for a friendship with Light was also emphasized in episode 25, the final episode where L appears, in which L attempts to "stab Light in the heart" with a final conversation in the rain.

=== Casting ===
In the anime adaptation, he is voiced by Kappei Yamaguchi in Japanese, and by Alessandro Juliani in English. He is portrayed by Kenichi Matsuyama in the live-action film series, by Kento Yamazaki in the TV drama, and by Lakeith Stanfield in the American film.

=== Film adaptations ===
Matsuyama had trouble portraying L and worried about his performance. He reasoned that L rarely interacted with others, and so portrayed him as if he did not "quite understand other people on an emotional level" and had trouble emulating L's postures. He also ate sweets like those that L would eat, and considered the details of L's signature gestures. Matsuyama said that he and Tatsuya Fujiwara, the actor portraying Light, became "so immersed" in their character portrayals that they did not speak to one another while on the set; when filming ceased they conversed and "went out for a drink or two". Hideo Nakata, the director of L: Change the World, told The Daily Yomiuri that he wanted to exhibit L's "human side" that was not exhibited in the Death Note series.

== Appearances ==
=== In Death Note ===
L uses a single, capital blackletter "L" to represent himself.

L, who also uses the aliases Hideki Ryuga (流河 旱樹, Ryūga Hideki), Ryuzaki (竜崎, Ryūzaki), Eraldo Coil (エラルド = コイル, Erarudo Koiru), and Deneuve (ドヌーヴ, Donūvu), the latter two for which he has developed reputations as the second- and third-best detectives in the world, is a very discreet and secretive individual and only communicates with the authorities through his assistant/representative Watari. He never shows his face to the world, instead representing himself with a capital L in blackletter font. His real name, L Lawliet, is only revealed in the guidebook Death Note 13: How to Read.

L is introduced as an enigmatic, nameless, international consulting detective, renowned for his intelligence and success in solving cases. He is later revealed as a young man in his 20s, tall and gaunt, with a pale complexion and dark circles under his eyes. Socially awkward and reclusive, he exhibits several distinctive habits including holding objects between his thumb and forefinger, crouching rather than sitting, going barefoot, and scratching one ankle with the toes of the other foot. He is depicted eating primarily sweets, cakes, and other sugary or dairy based foods, a diet that does not seem to affect his health.

Despite his eccentricities, L is portrayed as a highly capable investigator who often employs unconventional methods and is motivated more by curiosity or boredom than by a sense of duty. He nonetheless adheres to a personal moral code, is self aware of his own flaws. and refuses to act in ways he considers morally unacceptable.

L has spent most of his life dedicating himself to solving crime cases, and hunting down and apprehending notorious criminals and felons around the world. It is implied that he suffers from loneliness, internal torment and low self-esteem, even calling himself "a monster" at one point. He also possesses an unusually high intellect and uncanny skills in strategy, deduction, observation, reasoning and profiling, which have given him a high reputation amongst law enforcement agencies worldwide. At the start of the series, L carries out his own investigation of a series of mysterious serial-killings across the globe, all of which are carried out by an apparent supernatural serial-killer known as "Kira", which is the Japanese transliteration of the English word "killer". After deducing that the serial-killings are all connected and perpetrated by a single mastermind and are sourced from Japan, L allies himself with the Japanese police force and assists them in investigating the murders. Although he strongly suspects the series' protagonist, Light Yagami, a high school genius and the son of detective superintendent Soichiro Yagami, one of the primary members of the Kira investigation allied with L, to be Kira's alter-ego, he is unable to prove his theory, due to lack of evidence, but nonetheless remains suspicious of Light and carefully observes him throughout the series.

The majority of the series' initial focus is on L and Light's complex, cerebral and intricate psychological mind-game of cat and mouse, as both use their wits and intellect in an attempt to outdo the other and expose them. Though L comes very close to exposing Light as Kira, he is eventually killed by Rem before he can do so, but before his death his suspicion is confirmed that Light is Kira. Although L's death regresses the Kira investigation's progress, he had prepared a contingency plan to ensure that someone would continue the work of hunting down and apprehending Kira, by selecting two gifted child orphans to be his potential successors, one of whom eventually succeeds in exposing Light as Kira. Although his true identity and birth name is obscured in mystery throughout the series, L utilizes a number of aliases to maintain his anonymity, such as "Hideki Ryuga" or "Ryuzaki", the latter of which he uses as his primary pseudonym throughout the Kira investigation. Ohba said that L is the most intelligent character in the entire Death Note series because "the plot requires it."

=== In film ===
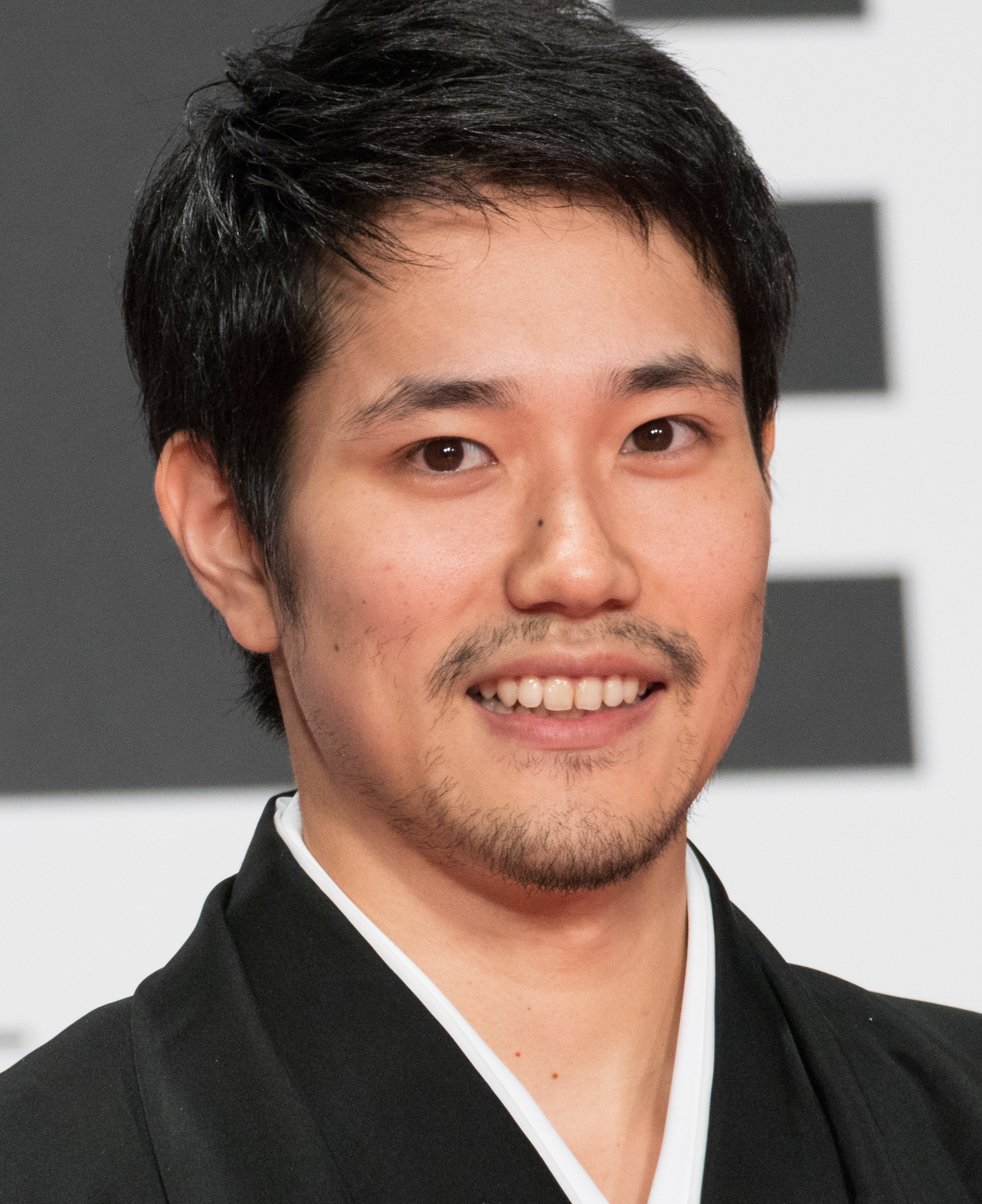
Kenichi Matsuyama portrayed L in the Japanese film series based on the manga.

L is portrayed by Kenichi Matsuyama in the 2006 live-action adaptation and its sequel, which was released on the same year. His performance and the characterization received widespread acclaim for being earnestly faithful to his original manga counterpart, although the films slightly alter his fate by having L succeed in unmasking Kira's identity before dying a month later after Light's defeat. In the 2008 spin-off, L: Change the World, which takes place in the 23 days that L has left before he dies, L decides to solve one last case, stopping a bio-terrorist organization led by "K" from spreading a deadly virus around the world. Along the way he meets a girl named Maki, FBI agent Suruga, and a boy whom he names Near. In the course of the film, L grew to have a close relationship with Near and Maki, and while he treats Maki like a younger sister, the girl seemingly became attracted to him. A day before his death, L made Near his successor and entrusted him to be taken care at the same orphanage where he grew up in.

In Death Note: Light Up the New World (2016), Kenichi Matsuyama reprises his role as L. He makes a cameo appearance with child Ryuzaki, who inherits his DNA, giving him a lollipop and telling him to not use the Death Note as Ryuzaki promises not to. He is also seen in a CG video that Ryuzaki created.

Lakeith Stanfield portrays L in the 2017 live-action American film adaptation. In this adaptation, he is shown as an enigmatic, skillful and highly esteemed international consulting detective. He is calm and calculating, yet socially inept and eccentric. He communicates with the authorities only through his handler/assistant, "Watari", and is affiliated with a number of law enforcement agencies such as the FBI, CIA and Interpol. He has earned a reputation for solving numerous cold cases, and takes up the task of apprehending the world-famous serial killer known as "Kira", who is responsible for massacring numerous high-profile criminals around the world through apparently supernatural means. This version of the character retains much of his manga counterpart's traits and characteristics, such as his preference to crouch rather than sit, his fondness for sweets, his socially-awkward, quirky and eccentric personality, and his tendency to hold things with his index finger and thumb. His past also originates from a secluded orphanage, though his real name is given as "Lebensborn Atubia".

Within the Orphanage, named St. Martin's Orphanage, he was subjected to a series of tests and experiments as part of a clandestine government project to raise intellectually-gifted orphans into skilled black ops agents. As a result, his mental psyche was severely affected, which explains his unusual quirks and his unstable, irrational behavior in the film's second half. After his training and the institute's subsequent shutdown, L gained a reputation as an expert international detective with the help of Watari, who kept his mental stability in check and acted as a handler.

=== In other media ===
In the light novel Another Note: The Los Angeles BB Murder Cases, L recruits FBI agent Naomi Misora to investigate a series of murders. While the story includes several phone discussions with him from Misora's perspective, he only appears in person at the end of the novel, when he goes by the name "Ryuzaki" – an alias he appropriates from the novel's serial murderer, Beyond Birthday, who masquerades as L under the alias "Rue Ryuzaki". The light novel also says that L won the aliases Eraldo Coil and Deneuve in a "detective war" with the real Coil and Deneuve.

In the 2015 musical adaptation, L is portrayed by Teppei Koike in the Japanese version and Kim Junsu in the Korean version. In the demo recording, he was portrayed by Jarrod Spector.

In the 2015 live-action TV drama, L is portrayed by Kento Yamazaki. The miniseries version has a few differences with other versions. His main outfit in the ministries is a white shirt and white trousers.

== Reception ==
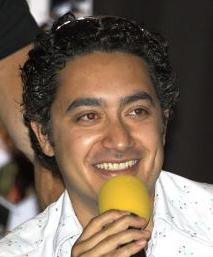
Alessandro Juliani's work as L's English voice actor has received praise.

Publications from manga and anime have commended L's character. Tom S. Pepirium of IGN describes L as "the coolest, most well developed character in anime today". Pepirium said that the "excellent translation" is responsible for L being a "success" in the English-language dub of Death Note. Anime News Network found that the mental duels between L and Light are appealing to viewers of the series due to how each attempts to discover the identity of the other while at the same time wanting to hide their own. The Hyper staff and Mania Entertainment's Julie Rosato agreed with Martin, with the latter commenting that L's and Light's rivalry as one of the best parts from the series to the point of being something "unique" in a manga. PopCultureShock writer Carlos Alexandre also praised their rivalry, he found L to be "too smart" noting that "some careful listening and application of critical thinking will make apparent the holes in L's supposedly superhuman logic, holes that simply, given L's character, should not be there". While reviewing the manga's third volume, Mania Entertainment concludes the article by saying that L "wins this volume; he really drove it forward" due to how close he gets to Light in such little time, which makes Light lose his temper after meeting him despite how calm he normally is. Pepirium adds that Alessandro Juliani, L's voice actor, portrays his slurping and gulping sweets as "somehow non-irritating". Theron Martin has also repeatedly praised Juliani's work, noting that he "captures the eccentric brilliance of L". IGN ranked him as the 12th greatest anime character in 2009, saying that "Every good lead character needs a challenge, and L provided the opposition that the Death Note series required to captivate fans." and ranked him as the 19th greatest anime character in 2014. Manga artist Katsura Hoshino, a former assistant of Takeshi Obata, has said that she likes the way the L is often drawn as he gives the appeal of a chill character.

In January 2007, Oricon made a poll in which they asked Japanese fans from manga and anime which characters from any series they would most like to see in spinoff series. The overall winner from the poll was L, who also ranked first in the women's poll and second in the men's poll. In the Society for the Promotion of Japanese Animation Awards (SPJA) from 2008 Alessandro Juliani was the winner in the category "Best Voice Actor (English)" for his work as L. Kappei Yamaguchi was the winner in the category "Best Voice Actor (Japanese)" from the 2009 SPJA Industry Awards for his work as L. L also won in the category "Best Male Character". In the NEO Awards 2007 from Neo, L won in the category "Best Manga Character".

== See also ==
- List of Death Note characters
- List of barefooters
