= Misa Amane =

Fictional character from Death Note

- Death Note character
- Misa Amane, drawn by Takeshi Obata
- First appearance: Chapter 25: "Fool" (馬鹿, Baka) (2004)
- Created by: Tsugumi Ohba; Takeshi Obata
- Voiced by: Aya Hirano (Japanese); Shannon Chan-Kent (English)
- Portrayed by: Erika Toda (films); Fuka Yuduki (musical); Sakura Kiryu (musical); Hinako Sano (TV series); Margaret Qualley (American film)

In-universe information
- Aliases: Kira II (第二のキラ, Daini no Kira; lit. "Second Kira")
- Nickname: Misa Misa (ミサミサ)
- Gender: Female
- Occupation: Model; Actress; Singer (in Death Note film series, Death Note: The Musical, and Death Note (TV drama)); TV personality (in Death Note film series)
- Relatives: Light Yagami (partner)

Misa Amane (Japanese: 弥 海砂, Hepburn: Amane Misa) is a fictional character in the manga series Death Note, created by Tsugumi Ohba and Takeshi Obata. Known as the famous model Misa Misa (ミサミサ), she seeks out Kira (Light Yagami) as she supports his cause to "cleanse the world of evil". Using her own Death Note, a notebook that allows its owner to kill anyone simply by knowing their name and face that she received from the Shinigami Rem, Misa does everything she can to aid Light. This includes shortening her own remaining lifespan by half, twice, in order to receive the eyes of a Shinigami, giving her the ability to learn a person's name just from looking at their face.

Although Misa fills the traditional role of the love interest, her relationship with Light is one-sided as he uses her simply for his own gains. In the anime adaptation, Misa is voiced by Aya Hirano in Japanese and by Shannon Chan-Kent in the English version. In the live-action adaptations, she is portrayed by Erika Toda in the films, by Fuka Yuduki (唯月ふうか) and Sakura Kiryu (吉柳咲良) in the musical, and by Hinako Sano in the television drama.

== Creation and conception ==
Tsugumi Ohba, the writer of Death Note, decided to create Misa to be the second Kira before serialization began. He felt that having the story solely consist of males would be "boring" and wanted "a cute female." Ohba, intending to introduce her with the Shinigami Eyes, described Misa as having to be "spontaneous and not too bright" and that he determined her personality from the start. Since Light Yagami would never want to trade for the Shinigami Eyes, Ohba needed another character to make the eye trade and decided to use Misa. Ohba said that the conception of the name Misa "was kind of random, but I think it was from "kuromisa" (Black Mass). It must have been based on something".

Ohba ultimately decided to introduce Misa after the death of Naomi Misora. He and Takeshi Obata, the artist of Death Note, wanted to use the Gothic Lolita design to convey the "gothic imagery of the Shinigami and that world". Ohba said that they're "into that fashion" and that having Misa first appear in unusual clothing would be "more interesting." Obata, imagining a mix of an "energetic Japanese artist" and a "foreign rock and roll singer", felt "set" with Misa's design after drawing her for the first time. Obata said that he felt "apprehension" regarding the length of Misa's hair, he wanted her bangs to be "straight across" but believed that creating Misa entirely within the bounds of Gothic Lolita style would be "too much." Therefore, Obata designed her so she looked "a little more natural" and to appear "cute" to people who "weren't into the Gothic Lolita style." Obata revealed that his editor warned him that the scene with Misa in restraints in chapter 33 was on "morally thin ground for a children's magazine," so they placed the title logo over the middle of it. This surprised the artist, who said he "held back" when drawing it.

When the Near and Mello story arc began, and Misa became a top idol, Obata decided to drop the Gothic Lolita style and make her look like "a popular actress." Obata said he remembered "having a lot of fun" while looking through Gothic Lolita magazines and drawing Misa. In response to a question inquiring which characters the creators faced the most difficulty in creating, Obata selected Misa. The artist said he had trouble comprehending the concept of "doing anything for the person you love" and felt like the character controlled him when he drew her. Death Note 13: How to Read also states that Misa "required a lot of artistic variation" because of her "many expressions" that ranged "from goofy to serious."

Obata assigned colors to characters when designing color images to "get the atmosphere right." He assigned pink and black to Misa. In the manga, Misa wears jewelry with a crucifix theme; in the anime adaptation, she wears fleur de lis jewelry, although the cross is retained on the collector's figure included with Volume 5 of the DVD series.

== Appearances ==
=== In Death Note ===
Misa as she appears in the Death Note anime.

Born in Kyoto on December 25, 1984, Misa Amane is a famous model known as "Misa Misa" from the Kansai region who possesses a Death Note given to her by the Shinigami Rem. Before her introduction in the series, Misa was attacked by an obsessed stalker. Unknown to her, a Shinigami named Gelus had fallen in love with her, and to save her life, Gelus wrote her stalker's name into his notebook, killing him. Consequently, Gelus himself died since Shinigami exist only to take human life, not extend it. Rem, who witnessed the whole event, then took Gelus' Death Note which was left behind and gave it to Misa.

Misa moves to Tokyo to meet Kira, a vigilante who uses his Death Note to serially murder criminals to rid the world of evil, as she agrees with his goal. A year before her introduction, Misa's parents were murdered in front of her eyes by a burglar. She could not forgive the killer and even desired to kill him herself. Still, following multiple delays in his trial, she began worrying about the possibility he would get off. However, he was killed by Kira, leading to her worshiping him. Using her Death Note, the media, and her Shinigami Eyes – in exchange for half her remaining lifetime, she could see a person's name and lifespan just by looking at their face. She can identify Light Yagami as Kira and earns herself the moniker "Fake Kira" or "Second Kira" by the task force trying to stop him.

Having fallen in love with him, Misa vows to do whatever Light says in exchange for him becoming her boyfriend. Light agrees to use her Shinigami Eyes and even though he tells her upfront their relationship will only be an act, she believes she can ultimately win his love. According to Ohba, Light sees Misa as a "bad person" who killed innocent people, so he acts emotionally cold towards her and manipulates her. Light and Misa both act together as Kira for over five years, until Light decides that it is too dangerous for Misa to be Kira with members of the task force suspecting him and tells her to give up the notebook. During the series, Misa performs two eye trades, cutting her lifespan in half twice: the first, with Rem; the second, with Ryuk. Misa loses her memories related to using the Death Note, by relinquishing ownership of it, at Light's orders and retains her love for him. The rest of her fate is not shown in the manga at all; she was last seen staying at the Teito Hotel. Ohba stated that this was simply because he did not have a situation to fit her in. The author speculated that after someone "like Matsuda probably let it slip" that Light died, Misa fell into despair and "committed suicide... something like that". Her death date is given as slightly over a year after Light's.

In the anime's finale, Misa appears standing outside the safety rail on the edge of a skyscraper and looking into the sunset. The official anime guidebook lists her date of death as unknown. Misa's English dub voice actress Shannon Chan-Kent said of the scene: "To see her commit suicide, inside I felt like, 'No Misa! Don't do it!' But it felt like the right thing for the series, the right decision. I'm sure everyone else knew it was coming but I didn't know!"

=== In film ===
Erika Toda as Misa in the Death Note film series.

Misa is portrayed in the films by Erika Toda. In the film continuity, Misa has a brother, who is murdered along with her parents. In addition, her appearance is slightly modified: while Misa has blonde hair in the manga and anime, she has brown hair in the films. She is first seen filming a dorama called "Misa-Misa's Happy Sweets", where she states that she is baking treats to make her enemies fat. After filming of that section ends, she expresses support for Kira to a journalist. Her supervisor asks that the statement be cut due to potential controversies that could arise from this particular statement. Misa's attacker, Ryotaro Sakajo, the assistant director for "Happy Sweets", dies from a heart attack when Gelus writes his name inside of his Death Note. Gelus' Death Note then falls in front of Misa, who immediately picks it up. After reading the notebook, she finds Rem.

In the second film, Mogi replaces Ukita as Misa's victim during the Sakura TV incident. Additionally, Misa first learns of Light's identity as Kira when Soichiro rescues Sayu who was at the TV station attending a fair. Misa is present at the final confrontation between Light and the police force, though she is handcuffed and restrained by another officer. When Light dies after Ryuk writes his name down in the Death Note, Misa breaks down emotionally. Her memory of the Death Note is erased, but she retains her obsession with Light, wishing him a happy birthday through a mini-shrine dedicated to him. Erika Toda said that, prior to filming, she felt "a lot of pressure" due to the character's popularity with audiences. She said the pressure vanished when filming began. In an article in The Star, a Malaysian newspaper, writer Kitty Sensei theorized that Toda did not have "the time to think much about how fans would react", citing film shoots that Kitty Sensei described as "physically and mentally exhausting" such as the straitjacket scene. Toda said that undoing the straitjacket took a lot of time, and at times she waited in the jacket between takes. Toda also said that on one occasion, she wore a blindfold for an hour during filming.

Toda reprises the role once again in Death Note: Light Up the New World. Ten years have passed since Light died. Misa continues her work as an actress while her activities are secretly supervised by police officers. She regains her memories after cyber-terrorist Yuki Shien gives her a Death Note. Initially refusing to cooperate with him, due to Light's death, she makes another eye trade from Ryuk and helps Yuki escape with the six Death Notes he collected by killing two of the Task Force investigators. Although she fails to kill Ryuzaki (whose name was written on a Death Note prior similar to L), she commits suicide by writing her own name, scribbled "Misa Amane dies in Light Yagami's hands".

Several years after Light's death, it is revealed in the sequel film Death Note: Light Up the New World that Light secretly had a son, (Note: The son's name is written "夜神光". While 夜神 is Yagami, the film does not state how the character "光", the boy's given name, is pronounced.) who was expected to inherit a Death Note and carry on Kira's legacy. Teru Mikami, who is the boy's legal guardian, has a history of working with Misa, which implies that she is the birth mother of Light's son.

=== In other media ===
In the live-action television drama, Misa is portrayed by Hinako Sano. Unlike the manga and anime, she has a red death note. Her hair is also brown instead of blonde, similarly to the live-action films. When she goes to dig up her buried Death Note, Mikami's assistant steals it, and Mikami uses it to help Kira. Her Death Note is burned by a fire set by Mikami; consequently, her memory of the Death Note is erased.

In the musical adaptation, Misa is portrayed by Fuka Yuduki and Sakura Kiryu.

== Reception ==
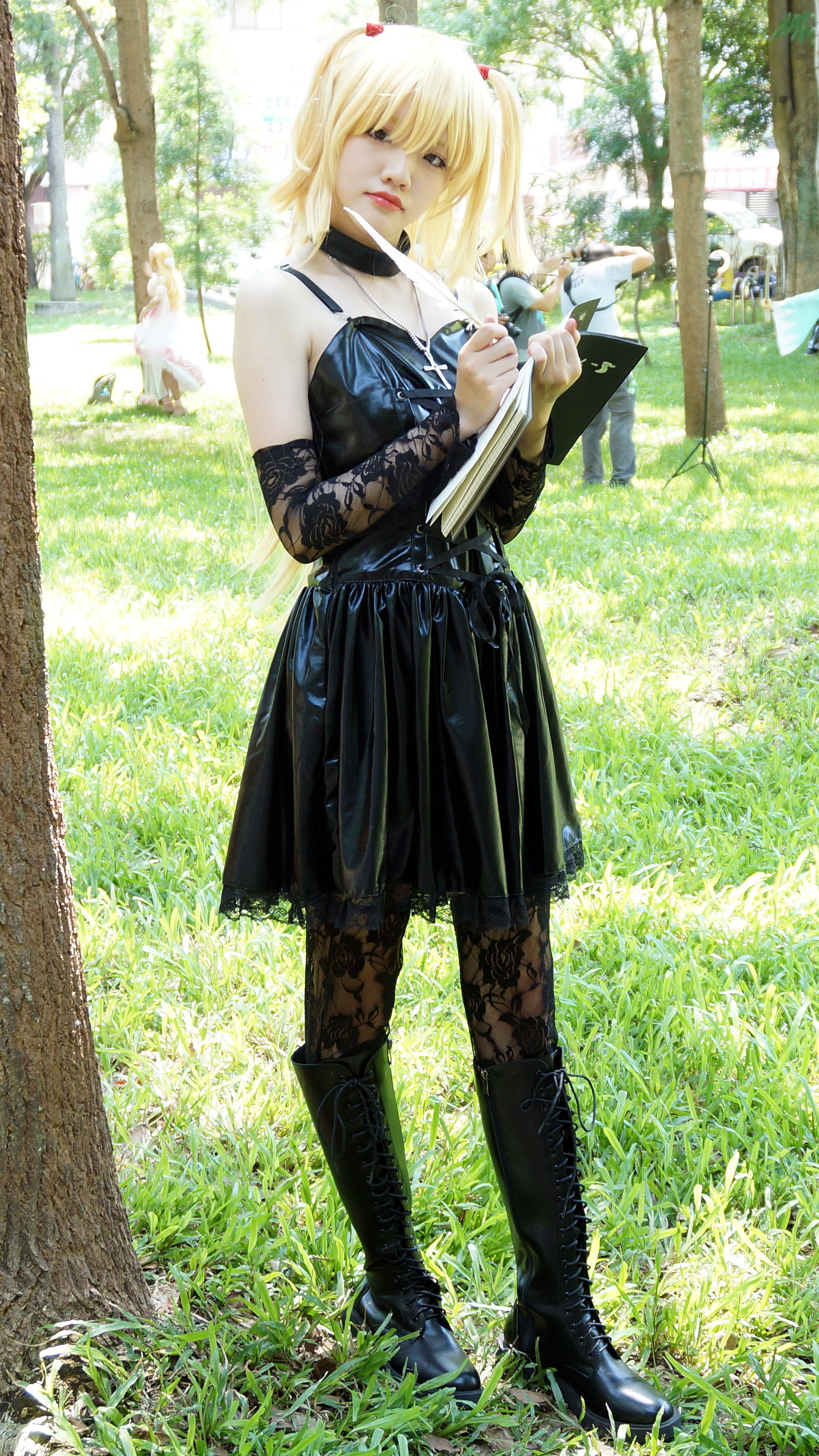
A cosplayer dressed as Misa.

Briana Lawrence of Anime News Network felt that even though Misa was an annoying girl clinging to the main character, "In a series full of geniuses it was amazing to see an average person get a hold of the Death Note. Her presence made things even more complicated for Light and she kept him on his toes as much as L did (maybe even more than L did)." Lawrence was disappointed that the epilogue of the series did not show Misa's ultimate fate. In a review of the anime adaptation, Michelle Yu, from the same website, praised Misa, saying she is physically beautiful and a "good-looking female addition to the screen", while also describing her as a "little diva with some serious issues and a very whiny voice". In a Salon.com article, Douglas Wolk describes Misa as being drawn in a "Japanese comics of cute, tiny, airhead girls with big eyes" and being a "lot cannier than she pretends to be". Wolk added that the reader could "watch her measuring how much quasi-innocent charm to pour on in every situation".

Tom S. Pepirium, a writer at IGN, describes Misa in a review of the Death Note anime episode "Performance" as being the "show's most mysterious character". Pepirium points out the tone in which the character is written, feeling that her motivation and obsession with Kira are "in league with Death Note's dark sensibilities". He says that when Misa spouts her deep and fully realized affection for Kira in "her wacky, excited, poodle-like way", the information "loses all impact". Pepirium uses "girly sophomoric pink fluff" and "Jar Jar" (a reference to Jar Jar Binks) as figurative descriptors for Misa. He has also compared Misa to Dot from Animaniacs. Pepirium said that he wished that Misa was a more serious character at times. Reviewing Death Note, THEM Anime Reviews called Misa "adorable, yet tragic", while also commenting how she becomes "pathetically infatuated with Light and obediently does his bidding", while at the same time threatening his immunity to the Task Force tracking him down.

Christy Lee S.W. of The Star said that Toda's portrayal of Misa in the second film "may seem rather annoying for being overly bubbly and cute at first" and that the character grows on the viewer "after a while". Lee stated that at the end of the film she saw the character of Misa as "quite endearing". Erika Toda stated in The Star that she views Misa as a "complicated and fascinating" character. Toda said that she does not comprehend why a person would willingly use a Death Note, but added that she admired the fact that Misa "does everything she sets out to do", though that the actions of Light and Misa are criminal.

Hannah Grimes of Comic Book Resources wrote, "Back when the show first released, Misa became one of if not the most popularly-designed goth characters in all of anime. With her super-cute black dress, slightly-wedged black boots and intricate fishnets dotting every possible part of the outfit, there's simply so much to take in and admire with this ensemble. This look is also still incredibly popular with cosplayers, and she'll most likely remain one of the more popular goth cosplay choices for a long time to come."

== See also ==
- List of Death Note characters
- Light Yagami
