= Tsugumi Ohba =

Japanese manga writer

Tsugumi Ohba 大場 つぐみ
- Born: Tokyo, Japan
- Area: Manga writer
- Notable works: Death Note; Bakuman; Platinum End
- Collaborators: Takeshi Obata
- Awards: Eagle Award for Favourite Manga for Death Note

Tsugumi Ohba (Japanese: 大場 つぐみ, Hepburn: Ōba Tsugumi) is the pen name of a Japanese manga writer. He is best known for authoring the Death Note manga series with illustrator Takeshi Obata from 2003 to 2006, which has 30 million collected volumes in circulation. The duo's second series, Bakuman (2008–2012), was also successful with 15 million in circulation. In 2014, Ohba collaborated with My Little Monster creator Robico for the one-shot "Skip! Yamada-kun". Another series with Obata, Platinum End, was serialized in the monthly Jump SQ from November 4, 2015, to January 4, 2021.

== Identity ==
Ohba's real identity is a closely guarded secret. Ohba said he never thought of becoming a manga creator, expecting the Death Note pilot to be passed on by Weekly Shōnen Jump. He has since cited Shotaro Ishinomori, Fujiko Fujio, and Fujio Akatsuka as manga creators he is heavily inspired by. Despite being an author, Ohba does not read much, instead he watches a lot of movies, being especially fond of those by Akira Kurosawa and Charlie Chaplin. He cited comedy as his favorite genre, and prefer Japanese films to American ones. The author described himself as a "clean freak" and usually cleans once a day. Ohba is fond of art lithographs, collects teacups, and develops manga plots while holding his knees on a chair, the last being similar to a habit of L, one of the main characters of Death Note.

There is speculation that Tsugumi Ohba is a pen name of manga artist Hiroshi Gamo, notably by Toshio Okada. Among other supposed hidden clues in Ohba's works, supporters of the theory point out that in Bakuman the main character's uncle was a one-hit wonder manga artist who worked on a gag superhero manga, similar to Gamo and Tottemo! Luckyman, and also that the storyboards drawn by Ohba resemble Tottemo! Luckyman in style.

== Works ==
- Death Note with Takeshi Obata (2003–2006)

Centers on high school student Light Yagami, who discovers a supernatural notebook that allows him to kill anyone by writing the victim's name (and knowing their face). The plot follows his attempt to create and lead a world "cleansed of evil" which he will rule as "God" using the notebook, and the conflicts between himself and anyone he sees as an obstacle, from law enforcement to the mafia to the greatest detective in the world: "L".

- Bakuman with Takeshi Obata (2008–2012)

Revolves around two high school students who team up to try to create a successful manga, so it will be made into an anime in order for the artist of the group, Moritaka Mashiro, to fulfill the promise he made to a girl named Miho Azuki, whose dream is to become a voice actress for anime, as well as the dream of Akito Takagi, the writer of the duo.

- Skip! Yamada-kun (スキップ！山田くん) with Robico (2014)
- Platinum End with Takeshi Obata (2015–2021)

== Awards and nominations ==
- 2007 Nominated – Tezuka Osamu Cultural Prize Grand Prize for Death Note
- 2008 Nominated – Angoulême International Comics Festival Official Selection for Death Note
- 2008 Won – Eagle Award for Favourite Manga for Death Note
- 2010 Nominated – Manga Taishō for Bakuman.
