= Ko Eun-sung =

South Korean musical actor (born 1990)

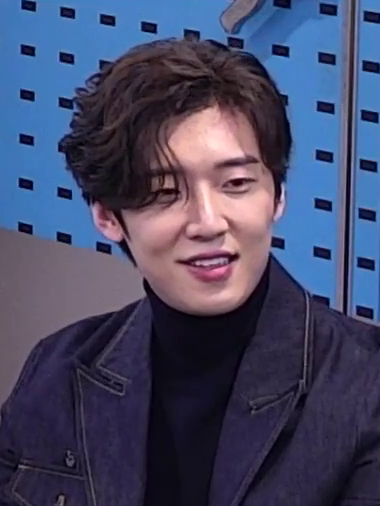
- Ko in 2023
- Born: September 11, 1990 (age 36); Daejeon, South Chungcheong Province, South Korea
- Education: Dankook University – Department of Performing Arts and Film
- Occupations: Actor; singer
- Musical career
- Genre: Musical threatre
- Instrument: Vocals
- Years active: 2011–present
- Label: Double K Entertainment
- Formerly of: Hpresso; KKD

Korean name
- Hangul: 고은성
- Hanja: 髙恩成
- RR: Go Eunseong
- MR: Ko Ŭnsŏng

Ko Eun-sung (Korean: 고은성; born on September 11, 1990) is a South Korean musical theatre actor and singer. He debuted in 2011 in the South Korean production of Spring Awakening and rose to fame by appearing on the JTBC audition program Phantom Singer in 2016, where he reached the finals and was part of the 3rd place quartet Hpresso. He has since played leading roles in various musicals in South Korea, and released his debut extended play Start Over in 2021.

== Early life and education ==
Ko was born in Daejeon, South Korea, on September 11, 1990. He has a younger brother.

In his second year of high school, Ko dropped out of school because he felt that he would not find his life path through studying alone, and started attending a practical music academy since he liked singing. He wanted to become a singer first and almost debuted in a band, but switched to musical acting after watching a performance of Notre-Dame de Paris he had been forcibly taken to. He therefore entered the Musical Theater department of Daekyeung University, which he quit after one semester because he had become intrigued by the world of musicals in Seoul after attending a lesson by Professor Cho Seung-yong, a musical actor; this decision almost had him kicked out of the family house. Unable to afford the move to the capital alone right away and not knowing anyone there, Ko temporarily stayed with a friend living in Incheon and attended an acting school while preparing for the entrance exam for Dankook University's Department of Performing Arts and Film.

== Career ==
=== 2011–2016: Beginnings ===
Ko debuted in 2011 in Spring Awakening while attending college, and later performed in Fame, Grease and Spamalot, among others. Finding himself unemployed after Fame ended, he returned to his hometown in Daejeon and worked part-time as a courier for a while. His financial struggles prompted him to decide to temporarily quit musicals and move to the United States with the help of one of his middle school classmates who already lived there to find a different job, earn money, and try again with musical acting in the future. At the same time, Yang Joo-in, who directed him the previous year in Goddess Is Watching, recommended he auditioned for the South Korean production of Wicked because she thought his voice tone would fit it: originally, Ko had no intention of trying for the musical, lacking the desire to play a "cool character" and having a preference for non-mainstream roles, but Yang's words convinced him to change his mind. He took the audition without aiming for a specific character, since he liked the Wicked numbers but had only heard of Elphaba's and Glinda's before, and was ultimately cast as Fiyero. Even though he struggled to resonate with the character's reasons at first, the role brought him further recognition as a musical actor thanks to his stable acting and singing skills, and he abandoned the plan to emigrate.

=== 2016–2020: Phantom Singer and military enlistment ===
Ko's career took off after appearing in the first season of JTBC's audition program Phantom Singer from late 2016 to early 2017, where he won third place as part of vocal quartet Hpresso. While on the show, he starred as mutant Romeo in Romeo and Juliet, a new interpretation of Shakespeare's tragedy set in a world shaken by a nuclear war. At the end of 2017, he was double-cast with Hong Kwang-ho as the titular character in Hamlet: Alive.

Having stayed close to fellow Phantom Singer contestant and Hpresso member Kwon Seo-kyung for two years, in June 2018 Ko collaborated with him to release a duet extended play, Musica, which included their eponymous cover of Paolo Meneguzzi's song first seen on the show. To commemorate the release of the album, they held a joint concert at Lotte Concert Hall on September 2. Later that month, Ko applied for the army band to fulfill his mandatory military service and enlisted the following November. While serving he starred in the army's original musicals Shinheung Military Academy and Return. He was discharged on June 23, 2020, and chose the musical Murder Ballad, which would open in August, as his comeback work. At the same time, he was cast as Anatole Kuragin in Great Comet, the Korean version of Natasha, Pierre & the Great Comet of 1812 by Dave Malloy.

=== 2021–2025: First album, Tomorrow's National Singer and further roles ===
In January 2021, Ko reunited with Hpresso and returned to Phantom Singer after four years for a special "All Stars" edition which gathered the top 3 groups of all previous editions. He was then able to perform in Great Comet, which premiered on March 21 after being postponed due to the COVID-19 pandemic in South Korea.

Celebrating his 10th debut anniversary, Ko released his first solo album, an EP titled Start Over, on April 13, 2021. He also held his first solo concert at the Blue Square Mastercard Hall in Yongsan-gu, Seoul, on the 12th and 13th of June. Later in July, he performed as the titular character in Hedwig: he was hesitant to accept the role at first, fearing that he might ruin the show if his performance was poor, but was praised by the audience for his powerful vocals, diction, and natural stage presence. Having to portray a transvestite and wear high heels and a wig, he watched videos of Brazilian drag queen and singer Pabllo Vittar, imitated his facial expressions, and practiced walking on tiptoe at home to prepare for the role. While starring in Hedwig, Ko joined TV Chosun's K-pop audition program Tomorrow's National Singer and ranked 6th overall, embarking in a nationwide concert tour with the other members of the top 10 as part of group KKD. In April 2022, he was cast as Light Yagami in Death Note, a musical based on the best-selling manga of the same name. It was followed by a starring role as Tony in West Side Story, which ran from November 2022 to February 2023 in Seoul. Ko then released an EP in French, Les Chansons, which included covers of Hymne à l'amour by Edith Piaf and Le Festin from the original soundtrack of Ratatouille; he held a commemorative concert for it at Lotte Concert Hall on March 4, 2023.

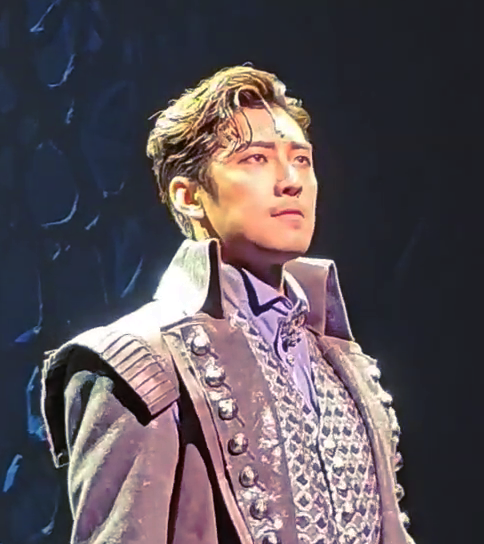
Ko performing in Monte Cristo, January 2024.

Ko received an offer to appear in Memphis, a musical based on the true story of DJ Dewey Phillips, at the same time he was performing in West Side Story. Despite not being impressed by main character's Huey solo, "Memphis Lives in Me", that they played for him, he did some more research and found the other songs to be upbeat and good. Since the production was not a replica of the original musical, which deals with racial discrimination in 1950s America, he felt that there was room to adapt it to Korean sensibilities and that he could make it entertaining, so he accepted the role. It was followed by the sixth South Korean production of Monte Cristo, in which he acted as the titular character.

Ko began 2024 by reprising his role of Anatole in Great Comet, which earned him the Best Supporting Actor award at the 9th Korea Musical Awards. He then appeared simultaneously in the fifth season and 10th anniversary performance of Frankenstein, and in The Rose of Versailles, from the same name manga series by Riyoko Ikeda. In December, he was cast as the titular character in the musical Cyrano, an adaptation of the play Cyrano de Bergerac by Edmond Rostand, based on the true story of Savinien de Cyrano de Bergerac. In the meantime, he voiced Fiyero in the Korean dub of the American musical film Wicked by Jon M. Chu.

In 2025, Ko held the Les Chansons concert at Lotte Concert Hall, performing again the songs from his 2023 eponymous extended play. He also returned to Memphis as Huey after two years, and joined the musical Man in Hanbok, which blended European stage aesthetics to Korean sentiments with a double setting in Renaissance Italy and Joseon Korea, in the dual role of genius scientist Yeong-sil and modern scholar Kang Bae. At the same time, he reprised his part as Fiyero in the Korean dubbing of Wicked: For Good, while also providing the voice to the Cowardly Lion and Chistery.

=== 2026–present ===
After an acclaimed performance as Light Yagami in the 2026 edition of Death Note, Ko was cast as Dracula in the eponymous musical. Having loved vampire themes since childhood, he called the role a "dream" that he took without hesitation. At the same time, he joined the sixth season of Elisabeth as Death.

== Artistry ==
Ko is known for his accurate pronunciation of lyrics in foreign languages, which he studies autonomously in his free time. He was first drawn to French after listening to The Age of the Cathedrals from Notre-Dame de Paris, and wanting to sing it in the original language, he attended a French school. He chose it as his audition song for Phantom Singer, leaving a lasting impression on Yoon Sang, who stated that his criterion for judging subsequent contestants would be to find singing partners for Ko. His French repertoire also includes Reste by Gims and Sting, for which he received the former's praise, and L'envie d'aimer by Daniel Lévi. In 2023, he released an extended play of chansons.

The first thing Ko does when approaching a character in a play is to write down his first impression on it. While he analyses his role, he does not decide details beforehand and instead acts on instinct on stage, following the principle that "when people deal with people [in real life], they do not decide what they will do or say".

== Stage ==
=== Musical ===
Year	Production	Role	Venue	Dates	Notes
2011	Spring Awakening	Chorus singer	Doosan Art Center Yeongang Hall	June 3 – September 4, 2011	
2011	Fame	Nick Piazza	Woori Financial Art Hall	November 25, 2011 – January 29, 2012	
2012	Grease	Danny	Seoul Gangdong Arts Center	December 1, 2012 – January 20, 2013	
2013	Grease	Danny	Seoul Hanwha Art Center	January 25 – April 28, 2013	
2013	Spamalot	Galahad	Doosan Art Center Yeongang Hall	May 16 – September 1, 2013	
2014	Grease	Danny	Seoul Uniplex Hall 1 Grand Theater	April 22 – October 19, 2014	
2014	Beastie Boys (Korean: 비스티 보이즈)	Kang Min-hyeok (Korean: 강민혁)	DCF Daemyung Cultural Factory Building 1 Vivaldi Park Hall	July 11 – September 14, 2014	
2015	Gaya Zodiac Song (Korean: 가야십이지곡)	Ni-mun (Korean: 니문)	Art One Theater 2	January 24 – February 1, 2015	
2015	Goddess Is Watching (Korean: 여신님이 보고 계셔)	Ryu Sun-ho (Korean: 류순호)	Uniplex Hall 1 Grand Theater	June 20 – October 11, 2015	
2016	Secretly, Greatly (Korean: 은밀하게 위대하게)	Ri Hae-jin (Korean: 리해진)	Uniplex	February 13 – March 20, 2016	
2016	Carbonated Boyz - Ko Eun-sung × Kim Sung-cheol × Lee Sang-yi Healing Concert (Korean: 탄산소년단 - 고은성×김성철×이상이 힐링 콘서트)	none	Lezhin Comics V Hall	March 14, 2016	
2016	Wicked – Daegu	Fiyero	Keimyung Arts Center	May 18 – June 19, 2016	
2016	Wicked	Fiyero	Seoul Arts Center Opera House Opera Theater	July 12 – August 28, 2016	
2016	Interview (Korean: 인터뷰)	Sinclair Gordon (Korean: 싱클레어 고든)	Suhyunjae Theater	September 24 – November 27, 2016	
2016	Romeo and Juliet	Romeo	Doosan Art Center Yeongang Hall	December 16, 2016 – March 5, 2017	
2017	Smoke (Korean: 스모크)	Hae (Korean: 해)	Uniplex Hall 2	March 18 – May 28, 2017	
2017	The Rocky Horror Show	Brad	Hongik University Daehakro Arts Center Grand Theater	May 26 – August 6, 2017	
2017	Interview (Korean: 인터뷰)	Sinclair Gordon (Korean: 싱클레어 고든)	Daehakro TOM Hall 1	June 1 – August 20, 2017	
2017	Hamlet: Alive (Korean: 햄릿: 얼라이브)	Hamlet	CJ Towol Theater, Seoul Arts Center	November 23, 2017 – January 14, 2018	
2018	Notre-Dame de Paris	Phoebus	Sejong Center for the Performing Arts Grand Theater	June 8 – August 5, 2018	
2019	Shinheung Military Academy (Korean: 신흥무관학교)	Dong-gyu (Korean: 동규)	Seoul Gwanglim Arts Center BBCH Hall	February 27 – April 21, 2019	
2019	Return (Korean: 귀환)	Kim Hyeon-min (Korean: 김현민)	Woori Financial Art Hall	October 22 – December 1, 2019	
2020	Murder Ballad	Tom	Sejong Center for the Performing Arts S Theater	August 11 – November 8, 2020	
2021	Great Comet	Anatole Kuragin	Seoul Universal Arts Center	March 20 – May 30, 2021	
2021	Hedwig	Hedwig	Chungmu Arts Center	July 30 – October 31, 2021	
2021	A Gentleman's Guide to Love and Murder	Monty Navarro	Busan Dream Theater	November 13, 2021 – February 20, 2022	
2022	Death Note	Light Yagami	Chungmu Arts Center Grand Theater	April 1 – June 19, 2022	
2022	Death Note	Light Yagami	Seoul Arts Center Opera Theater	July 1 – August 14, 2022	
2022	West Side Story	Tony	Chungmu Arts Center Grand Theater	November 17, 2022 – February 26, 2023	
2023	Death Note	Light Yagami	Charlotte Theater	April 1 – June 18, 2023	
2023	Death Note	Light Yagami	Daegu Keimyung Arts Center	June 30 – July 16, 2023	
2023	Death Note	Light Yagami	Busan Citizens' Hall Grand Theater	July 26 – August 6, 2023	
2023	Memphis	Huey	Chungmu Arts Center	July 20 – October 22, 2023	
2023	Monte Cristo	Edmond Dantès / Count of Monte Cristo	Chungmu Arts Center	November 21, 2023 – February 25, 2024	
2024	Great Comet	Anatole Kuragin	Seoul Universal Arts Center	March 26 – June 16, 2024	
2024	Frankenstein	Henry Dupre / Monster	Blue Square Shinhan Card Hall	June 5 – August 25, 2024	
2024	The Rose of Versailles	André Grandier	Chungmu Arts Center Grand Theater	July 16 – October 31, 2024	
2024	Cyrano	Cyrano	CJ Towol Theater, Seoul Arts Center	December 4, 2024 – February 23, 2025	
2025	Memphis	Huey	Chungmu Arts Center Grand Theater	June 17 – September 21	
2025	Man in Hanbok (Korean: 한복 입은 남자)	Jang Yeong-sil (Korean: 장영실) / Kang Bae (Korean: 강배)	Chungmu Arts Center Grand Theater	December 2, 2025 – March 8, 2026	
2026	Death Note	Light Yagami	D-Cube Link Arts Center	March 10 – May 10	
2026	Dracula	Dracula	LG Arts Center Seoul	July 11 – October 18	
2026	Elisabeth	Death/Der Tod	Blue Square Woori Bank Hall	August 16 – November 15	
2026	A Tale of Two Cities	Sydney Carton	Kwanglim Arts Centre BBCH Hall	November 11 2026 – February 8, 2027	

== Discography ==
=== Extended plays ===
Title	Details	Peak chart positions	Sales
Title	Details	KOR	Sales
Musica (Kwon Seo-kyung X Ko Eun-sung)	Released: June 22, 2018; Label: Stomp Music; Format: CD, digital download	28	KOR: 1,181
Start Over	Released: April 13, 2021; Label: Jeongmil, Dreamus; Format: CD, digital download	95	—N/a
Les Chansons	Released: February 27, 2023; Label: Library Company, Danal Entertainment; Format: CD, digital download	—	—N/a
"—" denotes releases that it did not chart or were not released in that region.

== Filmography ==
=== Film ===
Year	Title	Role	Notes	Ref.
2024	Wicked	Fiyero	Korean dubbing	
2025	Wicked: For Good	Fiyero, Cowardly Lion, Chistery	Korean dubbing	

=== Television ===
Year	Title	Role	Notes	Ref.
2016–2017	Phantom Singer	Contestant		
2018	Carefree Travellers	Cast member	Ep. 1–4	
2021	Phantom Singer: All Stars	Contestant		
2021	Tomorrow's National Singer	Contestant		

== Awards and nominations ==
Year	Award	Category	Nominated work	Result	Notes
2025	9th Korea Musical Awards	Best Supporting Actor	Great Comet	Won	
