= Death Note: The Musical =

2015 musical

- Poster for the 2015 Japanese production
- Music: Frank Wildhorn
- Lyrics: Jack Murphy
- Book: Ivan Menchell
- Basis: Death Note by: Tsugumi Ohba; Takeshi Obata
- Productions: 2015 Tokyo; 2015 Seoul; 2017 Seoul; 2017 Tokyo; 2017 Taichung; 2020 Tokyo; 2022 Seoul; 2022 Rio de Janeiro; 2023 West End; 2025 Seoul; 2026 London

Death Note: The Musical is a musical based on the 2003–06 manga series Death Note by Tsugumi Ohba and Takeshi Obata. The score is by Frank Wildhorn, with lyrics by Jack Murphy and book by Ivan Menchell.

Development for the musical was announced in December 2013. The musical had its world premiere on April 6, 2015, at the Nissay Theatre in Tokyo, Japan, with a Korean production opening the following July, running through August, at the Opera House of Seongnam Arts Center in Seoul.

== Plot ==
=== Act I ===
Light Yagami is a genius high school student in Tokyo, Japan, who despises criminals. He expresses his frustrations to his teacher, his classmates rallying to his side as he proclaims the failures of the justice system ("Where is the Justice?"). Meanwhile, two Shinigami ("gods of death") named Ryuk and Rem discuss how pitiful humans are, before Ryuk, seeking entertainment, drops a supernatural notebook called the "Death Note" into the human world ("They're Only Human"). Light finds it in the street and jokingly writes the name of a criminal that is currently holding a group of children hostage ("Change the World"). When the criminal dies, Light is initially horrified - until his hatred of criminals prompts him to use the Death Note to rid the world of crime, beginning a series of murders that quickly attracts the attention of the police ("Hurricane"). Following this, Chief Soichiro Yagami reluctantly proposes that they enlist the enigmatic but unorthodox detective known only as L.

Whilst Light flicks through the Death Note in his room, Ryuk appears and identifies himself as the notebook's original owner. He reveals that he will write Light's name inside when it's his time to die and that only those who have touched the Death Note can see him - as demonstrated when Light's little sister, Sayu, bursts into the room, completely oblivious to Ryuk's presence. When she leaves, Light reveals his plans to become the world's savior, using the internet to show Ryuk that people have joyously labelled the killings the work of "Kira" (derived from "killer"). Ryuk, amused that the people's "hero" is no more than a bratty teenager, reveals that he didn't choose Light for the task and merely dropped the Death Note out of boredom ("Kira"). Subsequently, Light and Sayu attend the concert of famous idol Misa Amane, who dedicates her performance to Kira ("I'm Ready"). Afterwards, when Sayu mentions that she believes Kira's actions are wrong, Light asks what she would say to Kira if she met him. He is left stunned by her response - she would tell him to stop, declaring that he should follow her brother's example, whilst Misa muses over how much she idolizes Kira ("We All Need a Hero").

Returning home, Light watches an Interpol broadcast in which L reveals himself and vows to capture Kira, causing Light to write his name in the Death Note. However, this turns out to be a trap; after the man dies, the real L's voice enters, explaining that his stand-in was a criminal scheduled for execution. Ending the broadcast with the deduction that Kira is in the Kantō region, L ponders their oncoming battle, realizing that his opponent is a high school student ("The Game Begins"). Reeling after carelessly falling into L's trap, Light tries to learn more about the Death Note from Ryuk, wondering how far he can manipulate the details of a person's death. Soichiro, now revealed to be Light's father, enters the room and discusses the case with his son, mentioning L's deduction from the schedule of murders that Kira is a student. Soichiro then declares that L was wrong to sacrifice his stand-in during the broadcast, advising Light to be as righteous as possible whilst unaware that he is Kira ("There Are Lines").

Whilst L deduces that Kira needs a name and a face to kill, Light asks Ryuk, who can see someone's name above their heads, to tell him L's name should they ever meet him. Ryuk instead offers to give Light his own "Shinigami Eyes" in exchange for half of his remaining lifespan. Rebuffing the deal, Light changes the schedule of murders, revealing Kira's connection to the police and forcing L to probe his own investigation team. Confident that the task force will retaliate by finding and exposing L's identity, Light ponders with his opponent the outcome of their game ("Secrets and Lies"). Afterwards, a news broadcast announces that the FBI have sent several agents to Japan, prompting Light to find the identity of one agent, Haley Belle, on his fiancée's social media profiles. Writing Belle's name in the notebook, Light specifies that they meet at Shinjuku Station, where the agent writes the names of his colleagues onto a Death Note scrap before committing suicide ("Hurricane (Reprise)").

Upon learning the deaths of the FBI agents, the task force is torn between their duty to capture Kira and fear of being killed. Soichiro gives each man the opportunity to leave, prompting one to quit the case ("Change the World (Reprise)"). Light and L listen from different locations as the citizens praise Kira, with the detective vowing to bring him to justice. Suddenly, a second Death Note falls from the sky and is discovered by Misa, who has fled from a stalker's clutches ("Where is the Justice? (Reprise)").

=== Act II ===
After the crowd praises Kira once more ("Where is the Justice? (Reprise 2)"), Rem appears before Misa. She reveals that the newly dropped Death Note belonged to a Shinigami named Jerasu who broke the Shinigami code by saving Misa from her stalker and promptly turned to sand. Explaining that Kira punished the man who murdered her parents, Misa begs a reluctant Rem to give her Shinigami Eyes so she can assist him ("Mortals and Fools"). Meanwhile, the task force admits to Soichiro their lack of trust in L, including their suspicion that he is really Kira. L then appears before them and offers his own suspect - Light Yagami. Vowing to investigate him closely, he meets the young genius in college, catching him off-guard by revealing himself to be L. Whilst the pair plot each other's downfall, Misa writes a new song declaring in subtext her devotion to Kira ("Stalemate"). As she records it, she sends a message to a TV station as "the Second Kira", begging to meet the original in Shibuya, which disturbs Light but amuses Ryuk ("I'll Only Love You More"). This message also forces L to accept the impossible, including the likelihood that Shinigami exist ("The Way Things Are").

The next day in Shibuya, news of the two Kiras is met with joy by the people, hopeful that the pair will join forces ("Where is the Justice? (Reprise 3)"). Afterwards, Light and Misa meet and introduce their Shinigami to one another. When Misa begs him to become her boyfriend in exchange for her help, Light manipulates her into revealing the name of a task force member following them, much to Rem's horror. After agreeing to meet on the college campus, they leave Ryuk and Rem to ponder the situation, with Ryuk warning Rem about getting too attached to Misa ("Mortals and Fools (Reprise)"). Later, L's continued assertions of Light's guilt results in a heated argument with Soichiro, ending with the revelation that the officer who tailed Light has committed suicide. Convinced that the two Kiras are working together, L leaves Soichiro to question his faith in his son ("Honor Bound").

Back at college, L challenges Light to a set of tennis, the intensity of their mental battle boiling over into the match ("Playing His Game"). After winning, Light probes L about his suspicions, at which point Misa arrives. Light introduces her to L, allowing Misa to see the latter's real name ("Playing His Game (Reprise)"). However, L has her arrested before she can reveal what she knows, having found evidence on the envelope sent to the TV station that ties her to the Second Kira. Blindfolding her and chaining her to a cross, L tries to force Misa into confessing, but she refuses. Appalled, Soichiro predicts that L will pay for torturing Misa and reaffirms his belief in Light ("Borrowed Time"). Rem then enters Misa's cell, offering to erase her memory of the Death Note so that she won't betray Light. Misa agrees, leaving Rem heartbroken ("When Love Comes"). Rem then finds Light and Ryuk, at which point Light talks her into writing L's name in the Death Note. Anticipating this, Rem agrees and orchestrates L's death as Light specifies, ultimately sacrificing herself to save Misa.

With the stage set for the final showdown, L goes to meet Light in an abandoned warehouse on Daikoku Wharf ("The Way Things Are (Reprise)"). Upon arrival, L holds Light at gunpoint, whereupon the latter confesses to his crimes and reveals both his Death Note and Ryuk. Light then declares his victory, as L's name has already been written by Rem ("The Way It Ends"). L shoots his foe, but this is part of Light's plan - he will tell Soichiro that L was the real Kira and tried to kill him, thus allowing him to join and ultimately manipulate the task force as he sees fit. However, L warns Light that the game has not yet finished before being compelled to commit suicide by the Death Note. As Ryuk congratulates Light, he laments that life will return to a boring routine without L to challenge him, and writes Light's name in the Death Note as the latter begs to be spared, declaring himself, "God of the New World" before he dies ("Hurricane (Reprise)"). Remarking that everyone's efforts were meaningless, Ryuk departs with the Death Note.

As the people mourn the loss of Kira, Soichiro and Sayu find the bodies in the warehouse and are left without knowing what really happened to Light. Meanwhile, Misa finds Rem's remains and disperses them, marking the latter's death and the end of the story ("Requiem").

== Productions ==
Wildhorn was approached to write the musical back in 2013, and prior to this, he had not heard about the series until his son convinced him to accept. The musical received a New York workshop in April 2014 in anticipation of the Tokyo premiere. The New York workshop cast included Andy Kelso, Robert Cuccioli and Adrienne Warren. An English concept album was recorded in December 2014 featuring Jeremy Jordan as Light, Jarrod Spector as L, Eric Anderson as Ryuk, Carrie Manolakos as Rem, Michael Lanning as Soichiro, Adrienne Warren as Misa, and Laura Osnes as Sayu. Eight songs from the album were released online in early 2015. As of 2024, 19 songs have been released from this concept album.

The musical premiered on April 6, 2015, and ran until April 29, 2015, at the Nissay Theatre in Tokyo, Japan, with Kenji Urai and Hayato Kakizawa sharing the role of Light, Teppei Koike as L, Kotaro Yoshida as Ryuk, Fuka Yuduki as Misa, Megumi Hamada as Rem, Takeshi Kaga as Soichiro, and Ami Maeshima as Sayu.

A Korean-language production ran in Seoul from July 11, 2015, to August 11, 2015. The cast featured Hong Kwang-ho as Light and Kim Junsu as L.

Another Korean production opened again at the Opera Theater of the Seoul Arts Center, running from January 3 to January 26, 2017. The majority of the actors from the 2015 production reprised their roles, save for the roles of Light and Misa; which were taken over by musical actor Han Ji-Sang, and pop singer, BEN. It was announced that this production of Death Note would be Kim Junsu's last performance before he began his mandatory military service in the South Korean army. From July 21, 2017, to July 23, 2017, a short 4-show run was performed at the National Taichung Theater in Taichung, Taiwan featuring much of the cast from the Tokyo production, subtitled in Chinese.

Another Japanese tour, which will act as a potential springboard for future international productions, premiered on January 20, 2020, at the Toshima Ward Arts & Culture Theater in Tokyo. This production features Ryouta Murai and Shouma Kai as Light, Fu Takahashi as L, Sakura Kiryu as Misa, Eiji Yokota as Ryuk, Park Hye-na, reprising her role from the Korean productions, as Rem, Kiyotaka Imai as Soichiro, and Hirari Nishida as Sayu, and is directed by Tamiya Kuriyama, reprising his role from helming the previous Japanese and Korean productions.

A Russian concert performance premiered on April 17, 2021, at the MIR Concert Hall, directed by Anton Presnov and Mariam Barskaya.

In 2022, on April 1 to June 26, it was once again revived in Korea with some main cast members from the 2015 production reprising their roles. Hong Kwang-ho and Kim Junsu are joined by Ko Eun-sung as Light and Kim Sung-cheol as L. The production received positive responses from audiences and was nominated for twelve awards at the 7th Korea Musical Awards, ultimately winning four. On February 5, 2023, a remount of the 2022 production was announced and ran from April 1 to June 18 at Charlotte Theatre, with all members of the cast returning to reprise their roles.

A Brazilian academic adaptation started a run on July 20, 2022, at the Clara Nunes Theater, Rio de Janeiro.

A concert staging at the London Palladium ran from August 21 to the 22nd, becoming the first English production of the musical. The cast featured Joaquin Pedro Valdes, Dean John-Wilson, and Frances Mayli McCann as Light, L, and Misa, respectively, as well as Adam Pascal as Ryuk and Aimie Atkinson as Rem. After its run at the London Palladium, the production transferred to the Lyric Theatre where it had a limited run from September 7 to the 10th. Notable cast changes for the Lyric Theatre production included George Maguire replacing Pascal as Ryuk and Jessica Lee taking over for Mayli McCann as Misa. A cast recording of the Palladium cast was announced in October 2023, with a release date yet to be announced.

A concert production happened at Rio de Janeiro on February 29, 2024, once again at the Clara Nunes Theatre with part of the 2022 cast reprising their roles.

In April 2024, in an interview with WhatsOnStage during the press call for Your Lie in April, Wildhorn teased that Death Note, alongside Your Lie in April and his other show Fist of the North Star could receive full productions in the UK soon, followed shortly thereafter by a New York run.

A fully staged London production, featuring a revised book and new songs, will run from 31 July to 12 September 2026 at the Barbican Centre. The cast includes Xander Pang as Light Yagami, Colin Ryan as L, Stephanie Zaharis as Misa Amane, Telly Leung as Ryuk, Grace Mouat as Rem, Paolo Montalban as Soichiro Yagami, Chloe Saracco as Jerasu and Elsie Buckley as Sayu.

== Soundtrack ==
Act I

- "Overture" — Company
- "Where is the Justice?" — Light, Teacher, Students
- "They're Only Human" — Ryuk, Rem
- "Change the World" — Light, Company
- "Hurricane" — Light
- "Kira" — Ryuk, Company
- "I'm Ready" — Misa, Backup Singers
- "We All Need a Hero" — Sayu, Misa
- "The Game Begins" — L
- "There Are Lines" — Soichiro, Light
- "Secrets and Lies" — L, Soichiro, Light
- "Hurricane (Reprise)" — Light
- "Change the World (Reprise)" — Cops
- "Where is the Justice? (Reprise)" — Light, L, Misa, Company

Act II

- "Where is the Justice? (Reprise 2)" — Company
- "Mortals and Fools" — Misa, Rem
- "Stalemate" — L, Light, Misa, Company
- "I'll Only Love You More" — Misa, Sayu
- "The Way Things Are" — L
- "Where is the Justice? (Reprise 3)" — Civilians
- "Mortals and Fools (Reprise)" — Rem, Ryuk
- "Honor Bound" — Soichiro
- "Playing His Game" — L, Light
- "Playing His Game (Reprise)" — Light
- "Borrowed Time" — Misa
- "When Love Comes" — Rem
- "The Way Things Are (Reprise)" — L
- "The Way It Ends" — L, Light
- "Hurricane (Reprise 2)" — Light
- "Requiem" — Company

Brazilian Production

Act I

- "Abertura" — "Elenco"
- "Onde Está a Justiça?" — "Light, Professor, Estudantes"
- "Só Humanos" — "Ryuk, Rem"
- "Furacão" — "Light"
- "Kira" — "Ryuk, Elenco"
- "Estou Pronta" — "Misa, Misetes"
- "O Herói Que Eu Preciso" — "Sayu, Elenco"
- "O Jogo Começa" — "L"
- "Há Limites" — "Soichiro, Light"
- "Segredos E Ilusões" — "L, Soichiro, Light"
- "Furacão (Reprise)" — "Light, Elenco"
- "Mudar O Mundo" — "Policiais"
- "Onde Está A Justiça? (Reprise)" — "Light, L, Misa, Elenco"

Act II

- "Onde Está A Justiça? (Reprise 2)" — "Elenco"
- "Meros Mortais" — "Misa, Rem"
- "Impasse" — "L, Light, Misa"
- "Meros Mortais (Reprise)" — "Rem, Ryuk"
- "O Jogo É Seu" — "L, Light"
- "O Amor Vem" — "Rem"
- "Então É Esse O Final" — "L, Light"

Barbican 2026 Production

Act I

- "Overture" — Orchestra
- "Where is the Justice?" — Light, Teacher, Students ^{2}
- "They're Only Human" — Ryuk, Rem, Jerasu ^{2}
- "Change the World" — Light, Company ^{1}
- "Kira" — Ryuk, Light, Company
- "I'm Ready" — Misa, Backup Singers ^{2}
- "They're Only Human (Reprise I)" — Rem, Jerasu ^{1}
- "We All Need a Hero" — Misa
- "Where is the Justice? (Reprise I)" - Light ^{1}
- "The Game Begins" — L
- "There Are Lines" — Soichiro, Light, Cops ^{2}
- "Mortals and Fools" — Jerasu, Rem ^{2}
- "Secrets and Lies" — L, Soichiro, Light
- "Hurricane" — Light
- "The Choice" — Cops ^{1}
- "Where is the Justice? (Reprise II) / Kira (Reprise)" — Light, L, Soichiro, Ryuk, Company ^{1}

Act II

- "Kira Chorus ( Entr'acte" ) — Orchestra
- "Half a Life" — Misa, Rem ^{1}
- "All or Nothing (Stalemate)" — L, Light, Misa, Company
- "I'll Only Love You More" — Misa
- "The Way Things Are" — L
- "Half a Life (Reprise)" — Rem ^{1}
- "They're Only Human (Reprise II)" — Rem, Ryuk ^{1}
- "Honor Bound" — Soichiro
- "Playing My Game" — L, Light ^{2}
- "Playing My Game (Reprise)" — Light
- "Borrowed Time" — Misa
- "When Love Comes" — Rem
- "The Way Things Are (Reprise)" — L
- "The Way It Ends" — L, Light
- "Hurricane (Reprise)" — Light
- "Requiem" — Company

Notes

- as of first preview, 30-07-26

^{1} New songs.
^{2} Significantly rewritten since the original English versions, with new singers, settings, or music.

== Casts ==
Role	US Workshop (2014)	US Concept Album (2014)	Tokyo (2015)	Japan/Taiwan Tour (2017)	Japan Tour (2020)	Seoul (2015)	Moscow (2021)	Seoul (2022)	Rio de Janeiro (2022)	London Palladium/Lyric Theatre (2023)	Tokyo & Japan Tour (2025)	London (2026)
Light Yagami	Andy Kelso	Jeremy Jordan	Kenji Urai, Hayato Kakizawa	Kenji Urai, Hayato Kakizawa	Ryouta Murai, Shouma Kai	Hong Kwang-ho	Aleksandr Kazmin	Hong Kwang-ho, Ko Eun-sung	Paulo Mendes / Gustavo Daniel	Joaquin Pedro Valdes	Seishiro Kato, Ao Watanabe	Xander Pang
L	Drew Gehling	Jarrod Spector	Teppei Koike	Teppei Koike	Fū Takahashi	Kim Junsu	Yaroslav Bayarunas	Kim Junsu, Kim Sung-cheol	Arthur Salerno / Luiz Gustavo Lopes	Dean John-Wilson / Carl Lee (alternate)	Hiroki Miura	Colin Ryan
Ryuk	Eric Anderson	Eric Anderson	Kōtarō Yoshida	Kazutaka Ishii	Eiji Yokota	Kang Hong-seok	Kirill Gordeev	Kang Hong-seok, Seo Kyung-soo	Júlia Perré / Bernardo Mastena	Adam Pascal / George Maguire	Kenji Urai	Telly Leung
Rem	Jackie Burns	Carrie Manolakos	Megumi Hamada	Megumi Hamada	Park Hye-na	Park Hye-na	Elena Gazaeva	Kim Sun-young, Jang Eun-ah	Gabriela Barbosa / Isabela Canle	Aimie Atkinson	Megumi Hamada	Grace Mouat
Misa	Adrienne Warren	Adrienne Warren	Fuka Yuduki	Fuka Yuduki	Sakura Kiryu	Jung Sun-ah	Vera Sveshnikova	Kei, Jang Min-je	Yasmin Ziganshin / Anna Paula Guimarães	Frances Mayli McCann / Jessica Lee	Riho Sayashi	Stephanie Zaharis
Soichiro	Robert Cuccioli	Michael Lanning	Takeshi Kaga	Tetsuya Bessho	Kiyotaka Imai	Lee Jong-moon	Aleksandr Marakulin	Seo Beom-seok	Davi Garnier / Gabriel Villas Boas	Christian Rey Marbella	Kiyotaka Imai	Paolo Montalban
Sayu		Laura Osnes	Ami Maeshima	Karin Takahashi	Hirari Nishida	Lee Su-bin	Evdokiya Malevskaya	Ryu In-ah	Camila Duarte / Rayssa Gomes	Rachel Clare Chan	Riko (from HUNNY BEE)	Elsie Buckley

== Critical response ==
The musical was one of the most highly anticipated musicals of the year in Japan and Korea. The Korean production received positive reviews from critics. Hong Kwang-ho and Kim Junsu were universally praised for their "powerhouse voices" and "brilliant, subtle acting;" while Park Hye-na and Kang Hong-suk, as the Shinigami Ryuk and Rem, were praised for "practically stealing the show." Wildhorn's score was also praised, while the story was criticized for trying to cram 12 volumes of the manga into a two-and-a-half hour musical. The staging was also criticized for being very simplistic and lacking in visual spectacle.

The London concert production received positive reviews from critics for its cast, music, and set design but was criticized for fast pacing and technical issues.
