= Kiyotaka =

- Gender: Male

Origin
- Origin: Japanese
- Meaning: Different meanings depending on the kanji used

Kiyotaka (written: 清隆, 清孝, 清高, 聖王 or キヨタカ in katakana) is a masculine Japanese given name. Notable people with the name include:

- Kiyotaka Akasaka (赤阪 清隆; born 1948), Japanese diplomat
- Kiyotaka Haimura (灰村 キヨタカ; born 1973), Japanese illustrator
- Kiyotaka Hayakawa (早川 清孝; 1946–2005), Japanese handball player
- Kiyotaka Hisauti (久内 清孝; 1884–1981), Japanese botanist
- Kiyotaka Ishimaru (石丸 清隆; born 1973), Japanese footballer
- Kiyotaka Imai (今井 清隆; born 1957), Japanese actor and singer
- Kiyotaka Kanai (金井 清高; born 1951), Japanese astronomer
- Kiyotaka Katsuta (勝田 清孝; 1948–2000), Japanese serial killer
- Kuroda Kiyotaka (黑田 清隆; 1840–1900), Japanese politician and Prime Minister of Japan
- Kiyotaka Matsui (松井 清隆; born 1961), Japanese footballer
- Kiyotaka Mitsugi (三ツ木 清隆; born 1953), Japanese actor
- Kiyotaka Miyoshi (三吉 聖王; born 1985), Japanese footballer
- Kiyotaka Nanbara (南原 清隆; born 1965), Japanese comedian
- Kiyotaka Shimizu (清水 清隆; born 1984), Japanese mixed martial artist
- Kiyotaka Sugiyama (杉山 清貴; born 1959), Japanese singer-songwriter
- Kiyotaka Suzuki (鈴木清崇; born 1979), Japanese director
- Kiyotaka Takabayashi (高林 清高; born 1928), Japanese speed skater
- Tochinishiki Kiyotaka (栃錦 清隆; 1925–1990), Japanese sumo wrestler
- Tochinowaka Kiyotaka (栃乃和歌 清隆; born 1962), Japanese sumo wrestler
- Kiyotaka Tsurisaki (釣崎 清隆; born 1966), Japanese photographer

== Fictional characters ==
- Kiyotaka Ishimaru, a character from the visual novel Danganronpa: Trigger Happy Havoc
- Kiyotaka Narumi (鳴海), the brother of Ayumu Narumi from the manga and anime series Spiral: The Bonds of Reasoning
- Kiyotaka Ayanokouji, the main protagonist from the light novel Classroom of the Elite.
