= Jarrod Spector =

American actor and singer (born 1981)

- Born: 1981 (age 45); Meadowbrook, Pennsylvania, U.S.
- Education: Princeton University; Atlantic Acting School
- Occupations: Actor; singer
- Years active: 2008–present
- Spouse: Kelli Barrett (m. 2014)

Jarrod Spector (born 1981) is an American actor and singer.

== Early life and education ==
Jarrod Spector was born in Meadowbrook, Pennsylvania.

He made his Broadway debut in Les Misérables, playing Gavroche. He then studied economics at Princeton University, but returned to acting before completing his degree.

== Career ==
In 2007, he joined the second San Francisco cast of Jersey Boys. Spector played Frankie Valli, a role he would play later in Chicago and on Broadway.

He appeared on Broadway in Beautiful: The Carole King Musical as Barry Mann from January 2014 to February 2016. He received a nomination for a 2014 Tony Award for Best Featured Actor in a Musical and a nomination for the 2014 Outer Critics Circle Award, Outstanding Featured Actor In A Musical for his portrayal of Barry Mann.

In 2014 he participated in the recording of the demo English version of Death Note: The Musical. He sang as L alongside Jeremy Jordan as Light.

Spector and his wife Kelli Barrett perform a cabaret act together titled “This Is Dedicated: Music's Greatest Marriages”, in March 2017 at the Scottsdale Center for the Performing Arts.

From 2018 to 2019 Spector starred as Sonny Bono in The Cher Show at the Neil Simon Theatre on Broadway.

From September 12, 2023 to 2026, Spector played King George III in the Broadway musical Hamilton.

== Personal life ==
Spector married fellow actor, Kelli Barrett, on October 26, 2014.

== Theatre credits ==
Year	Stage	Role	Notes
1991	Les Misérables	Gavroche	Broadway
2006-07	Jersey Boys	Frankie Valli	Chicago
2008-09	Jersey Boys	Frankie Valli	Broadway
2011-12	Jersey Boys	Frankie Valli	Broadway
2013	Beautiful: The Carole King Musical	Barry Mann	San Francisco
2013-16	Beautiful: The Carole King Musical	Barry Mann	Broadway; Nominated – Tony Award for Best Featured Actor in a Musical
2015	Death Note: The Musical	L	
2017	Roman Holiday	Irving Radovich	Golden Gate Theatre
2018	The Cher Show	Sonny Bono	Chicago
2018–2019	The Cher Show	Sonny Bono	Broadway
2020	A Killer Party: A Murder Mystery Musical	George Murderer	
2023	Beautiful: The Carole King Musical	Barry Mann	The Muny
2023	Chess	Freddie Trumper	The Muny
2023-2026	Hamilton	King George III	Broadway

== Awards and nominations ==
Year	Award	Category	Nominated work	Result	Ref.
2014	Tony Award	Best Featured Actor in a Musical	Beautiful: The Carole King Musical	Nominated	
2014	Outer Critics Circle Award	Outstanding Featured Actor in a Musical	Beautiful: The Carole King Musical	Nominated	
2020	BroadwayWorld Theatre Fans' Choice Awards	Best Featured Performer In A Musical Of The Decade	The Cher Show	Nominated	
