= Hong Kwang-ho =

South Korean actor

- Born: April 6, 1982 (age 44); Seoul, South Korea
- Education: Chung-Ang University
- Occupation: Musical theater actor
- Years active: 2002–present
- Partner: Kang Ye-Sol (m. 2017)
- Children: 2

Korean name
- Hangul: 홍광호
- RR: Hong Gwangho
- MR: Hong Kwangho

Hong Kwang-ho (Korean: %홍광호; born 6 April 1982) is a South Korean actor mainly known for his works in musical theater. He is best known worldwide for his portrayal of Thuy in the 2014 West End revival of the musical Miss Saigon. Hong has been named "Korea's biggest" and "most acclaimed" musical actor by media outlets.

In 2026, Hong was featured in Baeksang Art Awards Powerhouse 60 list as one of the 20 most influential Korean musical artists.

== Early life ==
Hong was born in Seoul, South Korea on April 6, 1982. He was first introduced to musical theatre through his sister who was planning to be an actor, and with this in mind he entered Kaywon School of Art and Design after her.

He graduated from Chung-Ang University with Bachelor of Fine Arts in Acting.

== Career ==
Hong made a debut on stage in 2002 as an ensemble member of the musical The Last Empress. After travelling to London for the West End run of the show, he was motivated to be a leading actor. However he was unable to land a role for years after returning from the military service. In 2006, would return to the stage in a Korean production of Miss Saigon as an understudy for Chris. With this experience he landed a role a year later as Haesoo, main character of the musical Cheotsarang (First Love), starring alongside Jo Jung-suk. In the same year, he also starred in a production of Sweeney Todd: The Demon Barber of Fleet Street as Tobias.

Hong became the center of attention in 2009 for his portrayal of the title characters in the musical Jekyll & Hyde, one of the best-selling shows in Korean theatre. He was noted for being the youngest actor to portray the main character. This would help earn him the Popular Star Award ar the 2009 Korea Musical Awards. After his run on Jekyll & Hyde, he starred in a new musical Bballae (The Wash) as Solongo, the Mongolian immigrant worker. The same year Hong appeared in The Phantom of the Opera as Viscount Raoul de Chagny. A year after, he was chosen to portray the title character of the show, making him one of the youngest actors in the world to portray The Phantom.

In 2012, Hong portrayed Yuri Zhivago in the Korean production of the show Doctor Zhivago after reprising his role as Doctor Jekyll. After Zhivago he played the main character, Miguel de Cervantes/Don Quixote, in The Man of La Mancha. He would reprise this role twice more in 2018 and 2021. Hong was also the male lead Bae Bijang in a production of Saljjaki Opseoye (Sweet, Come to Me Stealthily). In 2013, he began his starring in Notre-Dame de Paris as Quasimodo, another role he later would reprise in 2016.

In 2014, it was revealed that Cameron Mackintosh had chosen Hong to portray Thuy in the new West End revival of Miss Saigon. During his year-long run as Thuy, he was critically acclaimed and lauded by audiences and critics alike, and was awarded WhatsOnStage Award for Best Supporting Actor in a Musical. Hong would appear in the filmed Miss Saigon: The 25th Anniversary Performance, alongside Eva Noblezada, Jon Jon Briones, Alistar Brammer, Tamsin Carroll, Hugh Maynard, and Rachelle Ann Go.

After Miss Saigon and his return to Korea, Hong starred as Light Yagami in the 2015 musical adaptation of Death Note along with Kim Junsu as L. In 2016, he took part in the musical Bballae again. And after Bballae, he starred as Quasimodo in Notre-Dame de Paris.

In 2017, he took part in the musical Mr. Mouse as Inhoo. Afterwards starred in the musical Cyrano de Bergerac The Musical as Cyrano de Bergerac, for which he was earned a Best Actor Award at the Korea Musical Awards. Afterwards he took part in the musical Hamlet: Alive as Hamlet.

In 2020, Hong began his run in the first Korean production of Natsha, Pierre, and the Great Comet of 1812, a musical adaption of Leo Tostoy's War and Peace. In 2022, he reprised his role as Light Yagami in Death Note: The Musical. It ran from April 1 to June 26 at the Chungmu Art Center. The following year, he began his run as Christian in Moulin Rouge! ar the Blue Square in central Seoul and would reprise this role in 2025.

From 2023 to 2024, he starred in a new musical by Hue Park and Will Aronson, Il Tenore. The show received acclaim from critics and earned the Korea Musical Awards Grand Prize and Best Actor for Hong's portayal of Yun O-seon.

In 2026, he joined the cast of Beethoven as the titular character, alongside Park Hyo-shin. That year, Baeksang Art Awards unveiled their Powerhouse 60 list, honoring the 60 year history of Korean musicals. The list selected a group of actor, creators, producers, and works that left significant marks in Korean musical history since 1966, selected by musical industry experts. Hong was featured as part of the 20 actors selected.

== Personal life ==
In 2017, Hong announced his engagment to his long term partner, actress Kang Ye-sol. The two had met at the Gyewon School of Arts and began dating in 2010. They married on July 6, 2017. They have two children together.

== Theatre credits ==
Year	English title	Role	Theatre	Ref.
2002	The Last Empress	Ensemble	Hammersmith Theater, London	
2006	Miss Saigon	Ensemble, 1st cover of Chris & Thuy		
2007	First Love	Haesoo		
2007	Sweeney Todd: The Demon Barber of Fleet Street	Tobias Ragg		
2008	See What I Wanna See	Robber, Newsman		
2009	Jekyll & Hyde	Dr. Henry Jekyll / Mr. Edward Hyde		
2009	The Wash	Solongo		
2009	The Phantom of the Opera	Raoul, Vicomte de Chagny		
2010	The Phantom of the Opera	Phantom		
2011	Jekyll & Hyde	Dr. Henry Jekyll / Mr. Edward Hyde		
2012	Doctor Zhivago	Yuri Zhivago		
2012	The Man of La Mancha	Miguel de Cervantes / Don Quixote	Charlotte Theater, Seoul	
2013	Sweet, Come to Me Stealthily	Bae Bijang		
2013	Notre-Dame de Paris	Quasimodo		
2014 - 2015	Miss Saigon	Thuy	Prince Edward Theatre, West End	
2015	Death Note	Light Yagami		
2016	The Wash	Solongo		
2016	Notre-Dame de Paris	Quasimodo		
2017	Mr. Mouse	Inhoo		
2017	Cyrano de Bergerac The Musical	Cyrano de Bergerac		
2017	Hamlet: Alive	Hamlet		
2018	The Man of La Mancha	Miguel de Cervantes / Don Quixote		
2019	Jekyll & Hyde	Dr. Henry Jekyll / Mr. Edward Hyde	Charlotte Theater, Seoul	
2019–2020	Sweeney Todd: The Demon Barber of Fleet Street	Sweeney Todd	Charlotte Theater, Seoul	
2020 - 2021	Natasha, Pierre & The Great Comet of 1812	Pierre Bezukhov	Universal Art Center, Seoul	
2021	The Man of La Mancha	Miguel de Cervantes / Don Quixote	Charlotte Theater, Seoul	
2021–2022	Jekyll & Hyde	Dr. Henry Jekyll / Mr. Edward Hyde		
2022	Death Note	Light Yagami	Charlotte Theater, Seoul	
2023	Death Note	Light Yagami	Charlotte Theater, Seoul	
2023	Moulin Rouge!	Christian	Blue Square, Seoul	
2023 - 2024	Il Tenore	Yun O-seon		
2025	Moulin Rouge!	Christian	Blue Square, Seoul	
2026	Beethoven	Ludwig van Beethoven	Grand Theatre of the Sejong Center for the Performing Arts, Seoul	

== Filmography ==
=== Film ===
Year	Title	Role	Notes
2008	Gogo70	Junyeop	
2015	Death Note: The Musical	Light Yagami	Filmed live performance
2015	The Heat Is Back On: The Remaking of Miss Saigon	Self	Documentary
2016	Miss Saigon: 25th Anniversary	Thuy	Filmed live performance

=== Television ===
Year	Title	Role	Notes	Ref.
2013	Infinite Challenge	Self	Infinite Company (Muhan Company) 8th Anniversary Musical Special"	

== Awards and nominations ==
Year	Award	Category	Work	Result	Ref.
2009	Korea Musical Awards	Popular Stars Award	—N/a	Won	
2015	WhatsOnStage Awards	Best Supporting Actor in a Musical	Miss Saigon	Won	
2018	Korea Musical Awards	Best Actor	Cyrano	Won	
2023	Korea Musical Awards	Best Actor	Moulin Rouge!	Nominated	
2024	Korea Popular Culture and Arts Awards	Presidential Commendation	—N/a	Won	
2025	Korea Musical Awards	Best Actor	Il Tenore	Won	
2026	Baeksang Art Awards	Powerhouse 60	—N/a	Won	
2026	Baeksang Musical Award	Best Performer	Moulin Rouge!	Nominated	
