= Kira kira name =

Japanese given names with unusual characteristics

Kira kira name (キラキラネーム, kira kira nēmu; lit. 'sparkle name') is a term for a modern Japanese given name that has an atypical pronunciation or meaning. Common characteristics of these names include unorthodox readings for kanji, pop culture references, or the use of foreign words.

== Description ==
Names with one or more of these characteristics have been described as kira kira names:

- Unorthodox kanji readings: Kanji (Chinese characters used in Japanese writing) often have typical pronunciations. In kira kira names, kanji like 月, typically read as tsuki and meaning "moon", can be pronounced as raito, a Japanese pronunciation of the English word "light".
- Pop culture references: References to media such as anime, manga, or video games. For example, naming children after Nausicaä, from the 1984 animated film Nausicaä of the Valley of the Wind.
- Foreign words and sounds: Incorporation of non-Japanese words, or the use of katakana (often used for foreign words) in names.
- Unorthodox or taboo names: Names such as 王子様; Ōji-sama; lit. 'prince', naming children after objects, naming children after taboo concepts such as 悪魔; akuma; lit. 'devil'.

== Origin and analysis ==
It is not certain when the trend first arose; it possibly began around the late 20th century, possibly at latest the 1980s, and accelerated in the early 21st century. The topic has reportedly been discussed on the internet since at latest the mid-1990s.

Japanese culture has historically been seen as relatively collectivist rather than individualistic. A number of studies have suggested that in more individualistic cultures, babies tend to receive more unique names. The rise in the use of unique names in Japan has supported findings of a number of other studies that suggest that Japan is becoming more individualistic over time.

Some research has suggested that the trend is more prevalent for girls than it is for boys.

== Reception ==
The reception of kira kira names in Japanese society is mixed; publicized online debates that lean negative are reportedly common online. Some approve of the individualism expressed in the names, and others criticize the names as harmful for children or society. There have been concerns about children facing bullying or teasing due to having such names. One Japanese person interviewed by The New York Times claimed that parents who use such names are judged negatively.

In 2015, an article in the Japanese Journal of Pediatrics reportedly went viral in Japan, because it suggested that children with kira kira names possibly saw more nighttime emergency visits to the hospital. While the author of the article did not explicitly draw this conclusion, a number of people assumed it was because parents of children with kira kira names took worse care of their children. However, a number of sociologists argued that this was possibly because these parents were actually more concerned about their children's health, and took them to hospital for concerns that others might dismiss.

At least one person has been reported changing their kira kira name upon becoming an adult despite their parent's wishes. The person argued that some kira kira names may seem cute for children, but inappropriate for adults or the elderly, and cautioned people against giving their children such names.

== Government regulation ==
In May 2025, the Japanese government implemented revisions to the family registry act (which records household members' names and birthdates), aimed at curbing the proliferation of kira kira names. Under the new rules, parents are required to declare the pronunciation of kanji characters used in their children's names, and only officially recognized phonetic readings will be accepted. Parents selecting unconventional pronunciations are required to provide written justification, with authorities empowered to reject extreme cases. Media reports indicated that only extreme cases would be rejected, but the phonetic rule marked a rare change to Japan's family register (koseki). The reforms sought to address longstanding administrative challenges and public confusion, particularly in institutions such as schools and hospitals, and are also intended to facilitate the digitalization of public records.

== Notable examples ==
- The name "Pikachu" (光宙) uses the kanji for "light" and "space" and is pronounced like the popular Pokémon character.
- Light Yagami (夜神月 Yagami Raito) from manga Death Note was given the kira kira name Light that is written in kanji 月 (tsuki, lit. 'Moon') .
- Seiko Hashimoto, a former Olympic athlete and head of the Tokyo 2020 Organising Committee, drew attention for naming her sons Girishia (Greece) and Torino (Turin), reflecting the Olympic host cities of their birth years. While she selected kanji with intended pronunciations, the readings were not immediately apparent to others. She was named by her father after the Olympic Flame (聖火, seika), inspired by the 1964 Tokyo Olympics, the same year she was born.

== See also ==
- Japanese personal names
- Cultural globalization
