= Kenji Urai =

Japanese actor and singer (born 1981)

- 浦井 健治
- Born: August 6, 1981 (age 45); Tokyo, Japan
- Occupations: Actor, singer
- Years active: 2000–present
- Agent: Candid
- Known for: Elisabeth; Flowers for Algernon; Death Note: The Musical; Mr. Nietzsche in the Convenience Store
- Height: 181 cm (5 ft 11 in)
- Website: Official Profile

Kenji Urai (浦井 健治, Urai Kenji; born 6 August 1981) is a Japanese actor and singer known for his versatile performances in theater and television. In particular he is known for his roles in major theater productions such as Elisabeth, Death Note: The Musical and Crest of the Royal Family.

== Career ==
Urai debuted as an actor in 2000 in Kamen Rider Kuuga television series. In 2001 he played Mamoru Chiba/Tuxedo Mask in Sailor Moon Musicals and started his career in theater. In 2004 he portrayed Rudolf in Elisabeth and reprised the role multiple times until 2010. He is also known for portraying Matsukoma in Mr. Nietzsche in the Convenience Store television drama and Light Yagami in Death Note: The Musical.

In 2006, his performance in Flowers for Algernon and My Fair Lady earned Kikuta Kazuo Theatrical Award and in 2009, he received Kinokuniya Theatrical Award for his performance as Henry VI in Henry VI series at New National Theatre, Tokyo. In 2015, he received Yomiuri Theatrical Award for his performance in Flowers for Algernon and Constellations. He also earned The Minister of Education, Culture, Sports, Science and Technology's Art Encouragement Prize for New Artists in Drama department in 2017 for his range of performances in previous year.

On 1 June 2008, he transferred to Candid from Office Palette.

In 2013, he formed StarS, a musical unit with Yoshio Inoue and Ikusaburo Yamazaki and is active as a singer as well. He released his third solo album Various on 15 March 2023.

== Performance credits ==
=== Theater ===
Title	Role	Duration	Venue	Ref.
Sailor Moon Musicals	Mamoru Chiba/Tuxedo Mask	Jun 2001 - Sep 2002	Sunshine Theatre, etc.	
Would You Like Your Bento Heated Up?		Jun 2002	Theatre V Akasaka	
Marriage Scam Co., Ltd.		Feb 2003	Tennozu Art Sphere	
OKUNI	Ichizo	Jul - Aug 2003	Le Theatre Ginza, etc.	
Elisabeth	Rudolf	Mar - Dec 2004; Sep 2005; May 2006; Aug 2008 - Feb 2009; Oct 2010	Imperial Theatre, etc.	
Shakespeare's R&J		Feb - Mar 2005	Parco Theatre, etc.	
Cinderella Story	Prince Charles	May - Jun 2005	Le Theatre Ginza, etc.	
My Fair Lady	Freddy Eynsford-Hill	Nov 2005; Apr - Jul 2007	Imperial Theatre; Chunichi Theatre, etc.	
Flowers for Algernon	Charlie Gordon	Feb - Mar 2006; Sep - Oct 2014; Apr - May 2023	Hakuhinkan Theatre, etc. The Galaxy Theatre, etc. Nippon Seinenkan Hall, etc.	
Dance of the Vampires	Alfred	Jul - Aug 2006; Jul - Aug 2009; Nov 2011 - Jan 2012	Imperial Theatre, etc.	
Burn This	Larry	Nov 2006	Aoyama Round Theatre	
Titanic the Musical	Jim Farrel	Jan - Feb 2007	Tokyo International Forum Hall C	
Wait Until Dark	Roat	Sep 2007	Theatre 1010	
Kiss of the Spider Woman	Valentin	Nov 2007; Jan - Feb 2010	Tokyo Metropolitan Theatre, etc.	
WILDe・BEAUTY	Oscar Wilde	Mar 2008	Hakuhinkan Theatre, etc.	
Rudolf	Pupeteer	May 2008; Jul 2012	Imperial Theatre	
Carousel	Billy	Mar - Apr 2009	The Galaxy Theatre	
Cyrano de Bergerac	Christian	May 2009	Nissay Theatre	
Henry VI, Part 1 Henry VI, Part 2 Henry VI, Part 3	King Henry VI	Oct - Nov 2009	New National Theatre, Tokyo	
Gekidan☆Shinkansen; Goemon Rock 2: Rose and Samurai	Charles of Boscogne	Mar - May 2010	Akasaka ACT Theatre, etc.	
Takarazuka Boys	Kinzo Uehara	Aug - Sep 2010	Theatre Creation, etc.	
gargoyle		3 Dec 2010	Parco Theatre	
Édith Piaf	Yves Montand/Théo Sarapo	Jan - Feb 2011	The Galaxy Theatre	
Bedge Pardon	Grimsby	Jun - Jul 2011	Setagaya Public Theater	
Roméo et Juliette	Benvolio	Sep - Oct 2011	Akasaka ACT Theatre, etc.	
CHESS in Concert	The Arbiter	Jan - Feb 2012	Aoyama Theatre	
Cymbeline	Guiderius	Apr - Jun 2012	Saitama Arts Theater, etc.	
Songs for a New World		Aug 2012	Theater Creation, etc.	
Richard III	Henry Tudor, Earl of Richmond	Oct 2012	New National Theatre, Tokyo	
Gekidan☆Shinkansen; Goemon Rock 3: Zipang Punk	Charles of Boscogne	Dec 2012 - Feb 2013	Tokyu Theatre Orb, etc.	
A Tale of Two Cities	Charles Darnay	Jul - Aug 2013; May - Jul 2025	Imperial Theatre; Meiji-za, etc.	
NODA・MAP MIWA		Oct - Dec 2013	Tokyo Metropolitan Theatre, etc.	
Sherlock Holmes: Secret of the Anderson Family	Adam Anderson/Eric Anderson	Jan - Feb 2014	Tokyo Metropolitan Theatre, etc.	
The Big Fellah	Michael	May - Jun 2014	Setagaya Public Theater	
title of show	Jeff	Aug 2014	Theatre Creation	
Constellations	Roland	Dec 2014	New National Theatre, Tokyo	
Bombay Dreams	Akaash	Feb 2015	Tokyo International Forum Hall C, etc.	
Death Note: The Musical	Light Yagami	Apr 2015; Jun - Sep 2017	Nissay Theatre, etc. New National Theatre, Tokyo, etc.	
Troilus and Cressida	Troilus	Jul - Aug 2015	Setagaya Public Theater	
Arcadia	Valentine Coverly	Apr - May 2016	Bunkamura Theatre Cocoon, etc.	
'Tis Pity She's a Whore	Giovanni	Jun 2016	New National Theatre, Tokyo	
Crest of the Royal Family	Memphis	Aug 2016; Apr - May 2017; Aug - Sep 2021	Imperial Theatre, etc.	
Henry IV, Part 1, Henry IV, Part 2	Prince Hal	Nov - Dec 2016	New National Theatre, Tokyo	
Big Fish	William Bloom	Feb 2017; Nov - Dec 2019	Nissay Theatre; Theatre Creation, etc.	
Peer Gynt	Peer Gynt	Dec 2017	Setagaya Public Theater	
Bullets Over Broadway	David Shayne	Feb - Apr 2018	Nissay Theatre, etc.	
Henry V	King Henry V	May - Jun 2018	New National Theatre, Tokyo	
Ghost	Sam Wheat	Aug - Sep 2018; Mar - Apr 2021	Theatre Creation, etc.	
Gekidan☆Shinkansen; Metal Macbeth	Random Star/Macbeth Urai	Nov - Dec 2018	IHI Stage Around Tokyo	
The Man Who Laughs - Eternal Love	Gwynplaine	Apr - May 2019; Feb - Mar 2022	Nissay Theatre, etc. Imperial Theatre, etc.	
Hedwig and the Angry Inch	Hedwig	Sep 2019	Ex Theater Roppongi, etc.	
Shakespeare in Year 12 of the Tenpo Era	Kijirushi no Ouji	Feb - Mar 2020	Nissay Theatre, etc.	
Shakespeare in Year 12 of the Tenpo Era	Sado no Miyoji	Dec 2024 - Jan 2025	Nissay Theatre, etc.	
Maybe Happy Ending	Oliver	Aug 2020	Theatre Creation	
Richard II	Henry Bolingbroke	Oct 2020	New National Theatre, Tokyo	
Two Men	Touma Sutou	Dec 2020 - Jan 2021	Theatre Creation, etc.	
Time to Love, Time to Die		Nov - Dec 2021	Theatre Tram, etc.	
Guys and Dolls	Nathan Detroit	Jun - Jul 2022	Imperial Theatre, etc.	
Color	I / People Who Matter	Sep - Oct 2022	New National Theatre, Tokyo, etc.	
Gekidan☆Shinkansen; Rose and Samurai 2: Return of the Pirate Queen	Charles of Boscogne	Sep - Dec 2022	Video appearance	
La Légende du roi Arthur	King Arthur	Jan - Mar 2023	New National Theatre, Tokyo, etc.	
Pseudo Family	Wataru Kinoshita	Jul - Aug 2023	Theatre Creation	
Measure for Measure; All's Well That Ends Well	Claudio; Bertram	Oct - Nov 2023	New National Theatre, Tokyo	
Come from Away	Kevin Tuerff/Garth	Mar - May 2024	Nissay Theatre, etc.	
Le Miracle de Montparnasse	Amedeo Modigliani	Jun 2024	Yomiuri Otemachi Hall	
Fan Letter	Kim Hae-jin	Sep - Oct 2024	Theatre Creation, etc.	
Demon Slayer: Swordsmith Village Arc	Douma	Apr 2025	Video appearance	
A Man	Akira Kido	Aug 2025	Tokyo Tatemono Brillia Hall, etc.	
Death Note: The Musical	Ryuk	Nov 2025	Nissay Theatre, etc. New National Theatre, Tokyo, etc.	

=== Television ===
Year	Title	Role	Network	Notes
2000	Kamen Rider Kuuga	N Daguva Zeba	TV Asahi	
2014	Blue Flame	Kentaro Yano	TV Tokyo	
2015	MOZU: Ohsugi Detective Bureau	Tsuneyoshi Sato	WOWOW	
2016	Mr. Nietzsche in the Convenience Store	Matsukoma	Hulu, ytv	
2016	Love That Makes You Cry	Shohei Kanbe	Fuji TV	
2016	Wine, Dine and Woo Me Season 2	Hideyuki Seta	MBS	Episode 7
2016	Unlock for Infinity	Matoda	TV Tokyo	Episode 4, 5
2016	The Brave Yoshihiko and The Seven Driven People	Police officer	TV Tokyo	Guest
2017	Tsuribaka Nisshi Season 2	Yuichiro Fujioka	TV Tokyo	
2017	Idol × Warrior Miracle Tunes!	Okada	TV Tokyo	Episode 14
2019	My Middle-Aged Guardian Angel	Shinto Kowatari	TV Asahi	Episode 6

=== Voice acting ===
Year	Title	Role	Notes
2001	Kamen Rider Kuuga Special Chapter	N Daguva Zeba	
2014	Sherlock Holmes (puppetry)	Arthur Morstan	
2020	Kamen Rider Battle: Ganbarizing	N Daguva Zeba	Arcade Game
2021	Today's Uraken	Uraken	

=== Radio ===
- Urai Kenji's Dressing Room - Nippon Broadcasting System (AM 1242 kHz／FM 93.0 MHz) since 8 April 2018

== Discography ==
=== Solo albums ===
	Title	Release date	Label	Notes
1	Wonderland	3 Aug 2016	Avex Trax	
2	Piece	24 Mar 2021	Pony Canyon	
3	Various	15 Mar 2023	Pony Canyon	

=== Cast recordings ===
- Elisabeth - Highlight Live Recordings (Seiyo Uchino ver.) (2004) as Rudolf
- Cinderella Story - Live Recording (2005) as Prince Charles
- Flowers for Algernon - Premiere CD (2006) as Charlie Gordon
- Dance of the Vampires - Highlight Live Recordings (2006) as Alfred
- WILDe・BEAUTY (2009) as Oscar Wilde
- Roméo et Juliette - Highlight Live Recordings (Yuu Shirota ver.) (2011) as Benvolio
- Roméo et Juliette - Highlight Live Recordings (Ikusaburo Yamazaki ver.) (2011) as Benvolio
- Flowers for Algernon (2014) as Charlie Gordon
- Death Note: The Musical - Highlight Live Recordings (Kenji Urai ver.) (2015) as Light Yagami
- The Man Who Laughs - Eternal Love - Highlight Live Recordings (2019) as Gwynplaine

=== Videos ===
VHS

- Pretty Soldier Sailor Moon - The Birth! The Princess of Darkness Black Lady
- Pretty Soldier Sailor Moon - The Birth! The Princess of Darkness Black Lady (Revised Edition) - The Enigma of Planet Nemesis
- Pretty Soldier Sailor Moon 10th Anniversary Festival - Sanctuary of Love
- Pretty Soldier Sailor Moon - Mugen Academy - Mistress Labyrinth
- Would You Like Your Bento Heated Up?

DVD

- WILDe・BEAUTY
- Takarazuka Boys
- Rose and Samurai
- Cymbeline
- Goemon Rock 3: Zipang Punk
- Sherlock Holmes: Secret of the Anderson Family
- Crest of the Royal Family Ra version
- Crest of the Royal Family Hapi version
- Shakespeare in 12th Year of Tenpou Era
- Kenji Urai 20th Anniversary Concert ~Piece~ at Tokyo International Forum 2021.4.20
