= Kelli Barrett =

American actress

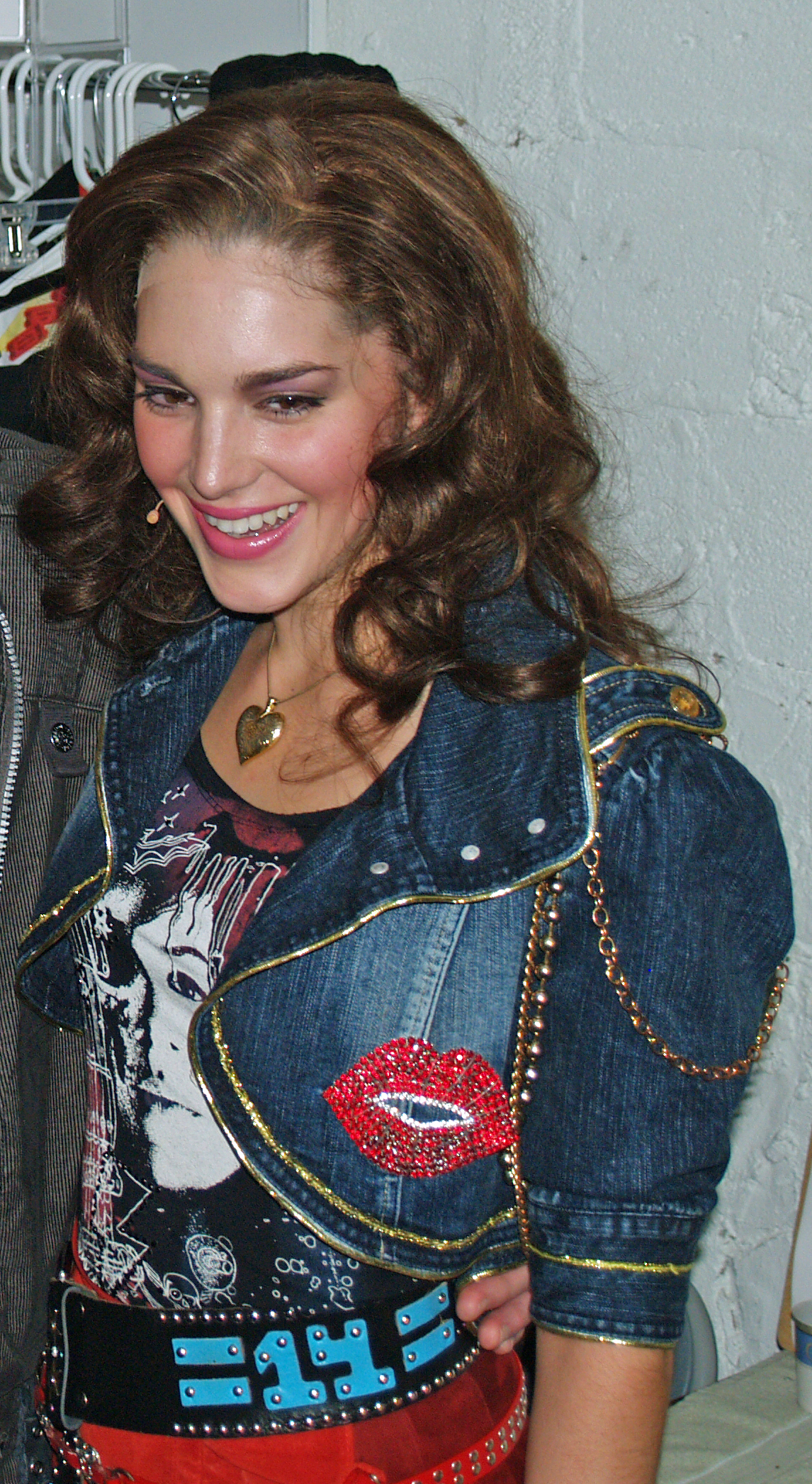
- Kelli Barrett in 2008
- Born: 1983 or 1984 (age 42–43)
- Education: University of the Arts
- Occupation: Actress
- Years active: 2003–present
- Spouse: Jarrod Spector (m. 2014)

Kelli Barrett (born 1983 or 1984 )is an American actress.

== Biography ==
Kelli Barrett was raised by a single mother in Virginia Beach, Virginia. As a child, she showed interest in acting after seeing Merrily We Roll Along on stage. She sang all the time with her mother stating "She’ll either be a lawyer or an actress because [she] loved to argue." Barrett attended the Governor's School for the Arts before attending University of the Arts in Philadelphia.

Barrett booked recurring roles on television shows including As the World Turns, Chicago Fire and I Just Want My Pants Back. She made minor appearances on The Good Wife, Person of Interest, Ugly Betty and Blue Bloods. She became part of the Marvel Cinematic Universe by portraying Maria Castle in Marvel's The Punisher.

== Personal life ==
Barrett married actor Jarrod Spector on October 26, 2014.

== Filmography ==
Television roles
Year	Title	Role	Notes
2008	Late Night with Conan O'Brien	Performer	1 episode
2008–2009	As the World Turns	Maddie Coleman	Recurring; 6 episodes
2010	The Good Wife	Bianca Price	Episode: "Doubt"
2010	Ugly Betty	Trista	Episode: "The Past Presents the Future"
2011	A Gifted Man	Rachel Lewis	Episode: "In Case of Abnormal Rhythm"
2011	Law & Order: Special Victims Unit	Dahlia Jessup	Episode: "Flight"
2011–2012	I Just Want My Pants Back	Jane	Recurring; 4 episodes
2012	Person of Interest	Lily Thorpton	Episode: "Super"
2012	Made in Jersey	Hannah Atwood	Episode: "Cacti"
2013	Chicago Fire	Renee Whaley	2 episodes
2013	NCIS	Ruby Lemere	Episode: "Seek"
2014	Blue Bloods	Maryann Russell	Episode: "Unfinished Business"
2016	Law & Order: Special Victims Unit	Phoebe Burnap	Episode: "Catfishing Teacher"
2016	BrainDead	Polly Savident	Episode: "Back to Work: A Behind-the-Scenes Look at Congress and How It Gets Things Done (and Often Doesn't)"
2017	The Blacklist: Redemption	Cynthia Stegner	Episode: "Independence, U.S.A."
2017	Wormwood	Isabel Bigley / Broadway Actress	Miniseries; Episode: "Chapter 2: A Terrible Mistake"
2017	The Punisher	Maria Castle	Recurring; 7 episodes
2019	Fosse/Verdon	Liza Minnelli	Miniseries; 3 episodes
2019	Dynasty	Nadia	4 episodes
2021	Dickinson	Adelaide May	Episode: "Split the Lark"
2021	Younger	Kamila	2 episodes
2026	The Punisher: One Last Kill	Maria Castle	TV special

Film roles
Year	Title	Role	Notes
2004	Syn	Vivian	Short film
2009	Confessions of a Shopaholic	Girl in Black / Talking Mannequin	
2009	Red Hook	Ellen	
2010	Remember Me	Miami Brunette	
2010	The Switch	Jessica	
2011	Mr. Popper's Penguins	Tommy's Mom	
2014	Zarra's Law	Vanessa Andreoli	
2016	Happy Baby	Zahava	

== Stage ==
Stage roles
Year	Title	Role	Notes
2007	Gypsy	Louise	Regional
2008	Rock of Ages	Sherrie Christian	Original Off-Broadway Cast
2009	The Royal Family	Gwen Cavendish	Broadway Revival
2011	Baby It's You!	Mary Jane Greenberg / Lesley Gore	Original Broadway Cast
2012	Anastasia	Anya / Anastasia	Workshop
2014-15	Wicked	Nessarose	Broadway Replacement
2015	Doctor Zhivago	Lara Guishar	Original Broadway Cast
2016	My Fair Lady	Eliza	Regional
2017	Deathless	Samantha Serling	World Premiere Cast
2018	Gettin' the Band Back Together	Dani Franco	Original Broadway Cast
2023	Parade	Mrs. Phagan	Broadway Revival Cast
2026	Beaches	Roberta "Bertie" White	Original Broadway Cast
