= Jessica Lee (actress) =

British actress

- 이하연
- Born: 22 September
- Education: ArtsEd
- Years active: 2018–present

Jessica Lee (Korean: 이하연; born 22 September) is a British actress. She is known for her work in musical theatre. For her performance in Miss Saigon, she won Best Performer at The Stage Debut Awards. She also starred in Death Note: The Musical and The Lightning Thief.

== Early life ==
Lee is of Korean heritage. Lee attended the BRIT School. She joined the National Youth Music Theatre. She graduated with a Bachelor of Arts (BA) in Musical Theatre from the Arts Educational School (ArtsEd) in 2018.

== Career ==
Upon graduating from ArtsEd, Lee made her West End debut when she joined the company of Les Misérables at the Queen's Theatre. She also served as 1st cover Éponine. This was followed by further roles understudying the Mistress in Jamie Lloyd's Evita at Regent's Park Open Air Theatre, in High Fidelity at the Turbine Theatre, and understudying Tzipporah in The Prince of Egypt at the Dominion Theatre. For Christmas 2020, Lee played Dandini in the socially distanced Nottingham Playhouse pantomime of Cinderella.

After the COVID-19 lockdown, Lee featured in concerts for Children of Eden in 2021 and Chess in 2022. She made her television and feature film debuts with a guest appearance in an episode of the BBC One medical soap opera Casualty and a minor role in the Disney sequel film Disenchanted.

In 2023, Lee starred as Kim opposite Joanna Ampil in Miss Saigon at the Crucible Theatre in Sheffield and took over the role of Misa Amane from Frances Mayli McCann in Death Note: The Musical in concert when the production transferred from the London Palladium to the Lyric Theatre. For her performance in the former, Lee won Best Performer at The Stage Debut Awards. Lee also appeared in episodes of the Amazon Prime series The Power and the Disney+ series The Full Monty.

The following year, Lee portrayed Annabeth Chase in the London production of The Lightning Thief musical adaptation at The Other Palace Theatre alongside Max Harwood and Scott Folan.

== Filmography ==
| Year | Title | Role | Theatre |
|---|---|---|---|
| 2022 | Casualty | Melissa Cheung | Episode: "Just Between Us" |
| 2022 | Disenchanted | Society Girl | |
| 2023 | The Power | Angel | Episode: "A New Organ" |
| 2023 | The Full Monty | Mun-Hee | 2 episodes |

== Stage ==
| Year | Title | Role | Theatre |
|---|---|---|---|
| 2018 | Les Misérables | 1st cover Éponine | Queen's Theatre, London |
| 2019 | Evita | understudy Mistress | Regent's Park Open Air Theatre, London |
| 2019 | High Fidelity | Ensemble | Turbine Theatre, London |
| 2020, 2021 | The Prince of Egypt | understudy Tzipporah / ensemble | Dominion Theatre, London |
| 2020 | Cinderella | Dandini | Nottingham Playhouse |
| 2021 | Children of Eden | | Concert |
| 2022 | Chess | Ensemble | Concert, Theatre Royal Drury Lane |
| 2023 | Miss Saigon | Kim | Crucible Theatre, Sheffield |
| 2023 | Death Note: The Musical | Misa Amane | Lyric Theatre, London |
| 2024–2025 | The Lightning Thief | Annabeth Chase | The Other Palace, London |
