= Mr. Nietzsche in the Convenience Store =

Japanese manga series

- Cover of Mr. Nietzsche in the Convenience Store volume one

ニーチェ先生～コンビニに、さとり世代の新人が舞い降りた～ (Nietzsche-sensei ~Konbini ni, Satori Sedai no Shinjin ga Maiorita~)
- Genre: Comedy
- Manga
- Written by: Matsukoma
- Illustrated by: Hashimoto
- Published by: Media Factory
- Magazine: Monthly Comic Gene (12 August 2013 – 15 December 2018); Comic Bridge (29 January 2019 – 23 January 2026)
- Original run: 12 August 2013 – 23 January 2026
- Volumes: 24
- Television drama
- Directed by: Yūichi Fukuda
- Written by: Yūichi Fukuda
- Music by: Eishi Segawa
- Original network: Yomiuri TV, Hulu, Crunchyroll
- Original run: 1 January 2016 – present

Mr. Nietzsche in the Convenience Store (ニーチェ先生～コンビニに、さとり世代の新人が舞い降りた～, Niiche-sensei ~Konbini ni, Satori Sedai no Shinjin ga Maiorita~) was a Japanese shōjo comedy manga series written by Matsukoma and illustrated by Hashimoto. The manga was serialized in Monthly Comic Gene from August 2013 to December 2018, and in Comic Bridge from January 2019 to January 2026. A live-action television adaptation has been produced.

== Media ==
=== Manga ===
The manga, written by Matsukoma and illustrated by Hashimoto, began serialization in 12 August 2013 with the release of the September issue of Media Factory's shōjo magazine Monthly Comic Gene. The manga stayed on Comic Gene until the January 2019 issue, released on 15 December 2018, when it was moved to Kadokawa's Comic Bridge manga website, with the first new chapter premiering on 29 January 2019. The manga ended on 23 January 2026. The series was based on a series of Twitter posts detailing the lives of real-life convenience store employees. The individual chapters were collected in twenty-four tankōbon volumes from January 2014 to February 2026.

An audio drama CD was released in February 2015.

Kadokawa released a Japanese/English bilingual volume on 22 June 2018.

==== Volume list ====
No.	Japanese release date	Japanese ISBN
1	27 January 2014	978-4-04-066237-4
2	26 July 2014	978-4-04-066821-5
3	27 January 2015	978-4-04-067255-7; 978-4-04-066846-8 (SE)
4	27 August 2015	978-4-04-067592-3
5	27 February 2016	978-4-04-068208-2
6	27 August 2016	978-4-04-068518-2
7	27 July 2017	978-4-04-069295-1
8	27 January 2018	978-4-04-069643-0
9	27 July 2018	978-4-04-069983-7
10	26 January 2019	978-4-04-065400-3
11	27 August 2019	978-4-04-065867-4
12	27 February 2020	978-4-04-064386-1
13	27 August 2020	978-4-04-064848-4
14	25 February 2021	978-4-04-680181-4
15	26 August 2021	978-4-04-680623-9
16	26 February 2022	978-4-04-681118-9
17	26 August 2022	978-4-04-681604-7
18	27 February 2023	978-4-04-682124-9
19	25 August 2023	978-4-04-682784-5
20	27 February 2024	978-4-04-683321-1
21	27 August 2024	978-4-04-683972-5
22	27 February 2025	978-4-04-684571-9
23	27 August 2025	978-4-04-685120-8
24	27 February 2026	978-4-04-685805-4

=== TV drama ===
It was announced in the September 2015 issue of Monthly Comic Gene that the series would be adapted into a live-action television drama. The series was written and directed by Yūichi Fukuda, and premiered on Yomiuri TV, Hulu, and crunchyroll starting on 1 January 2016. Shōtarō Mamiya played Tomoharu Nii and Kenji Urai played Matsukoma.

== Reception ==
As of the September 2015 issue of Monthly Comic Gene, the series had over 1 million copies in print. Prior to the release of the 24th and final volume, the series had over 2.7 million copies in print.

In a list of best-selling first volumes published in 2014, compiled by The Japan Publication Sales' Distribution Reform Group Comic Team, the series ranked number three. It also ranked number three on a list of the top 15 manga series containing less than five volumes, based on a poll of 2,360 bookstore employees conducted by the online bookseller Honya Club. The series ranked fourth in the first Next Manga Award in the print manga category.
