= Kiyotaka Hisauti =

Japanese botanist (1884-1981)

Kiyotaka Hisauti (久内 清孝, Hisauchi Kiyotaka, 1884–1981) was a Japanese botanist noted for identifying at least 19 species of flowering plants in Japan. He was a senior member of the editorial board of the Journal of Japanese Botany.

The standard author abbreviation Hisauti is used to indicate this person as the author when citing a botanical name.
