= Korea Musical Awards =

Korea Musical Theater Association awards

- Awarded for: Excellence in musical theatre
- Date: January 10, 2022
- Location: Seoul
- Country: South Korea
- Presented by: Korea Musical Theater Association
- First award: 1995
- Final award: 2013
- Website: http://www.koreamusicalawards.com

Television/radio coverage
- Network: Naver TV

The Korea Musical Awards (Korean: 한국 뮤지컬 대상) was a South Korean awards ceremony for musical theater, hosted annually by Sports Chosun. Established in 1995, it ran for 19 ceremonies, with its final event held in 2013. Typically held in late October, the awards recognized musical works performed and actors who appeared in those works from October of the previous year to September of the current year. The 20th ceremony, planned for 2014, was canceled due to organizational circumstances, and the awards were subsequently permanently abolished due to budget shortages.

== Overview ==
The Korea Musical Awards emerged from a growing public fascination with musical theater in South Korea. Previously, musicals were often relegated to subcategories within broader play awards. The dedicated ceremony, spearheaded by reporter Park Yong-jae as part of the "Watching Musicals" initiative, aimed to distinctly define and foster the development of the genre. The inaugural event set a significant precedent by combining the awards ceremony with a celebratory musical concert, even pausing performances at the Munye Theater for a day to host the event, underscoring its importance to the industry.

The awards' core mission was to popularize musicals and revitalize original Korean productions. Consequently, they prioritized local works for major categories such as the Grand Prize, Best Composition, and Best Script. While acknowledging the increasing market influence of licensed international musicals in the 2000s—highlighted by the success of The Phantom of the Opera in 2002—the awards adapted by introducing the "Best International Musical" category. This annual festival served as a comprehensive overview of the year's musical landscape, engaging the entire musical community through its gala show, which was broadcast with a time delay. The Korea Musical Awards ran for 19 editions, concluding in 2013.

== Past Winners ==
=== Best Musical Award Winners ===
| No. | Year | Work | |
| No. | Year | Original | Licensed |
|---|---|---|---|
| 1st | 1995 | I'm Gonna Be a Star | |
| 2nd | 1996 | The Last Empress | |
| 3rd | 1997 | Winter Wanderer | |
| 4th | 1998 | Hanne | |
| 5th | 1999 | Anikkeng | |
| 6th | 2000 | Typhoon | |
| 7th | 2001 | No winner | |
| 8th | 2002 | The Play | |
| 9th | 2003 | Romeo and Juliet | |
| 10th | 2004 | Maria Maria | |
| 11th | 2005 | I Love You | |
| 12th | 2006 | Oh! While You Were Sleeping | |
| 13th | 2007 | Dancing Shadow | |
| 14th | 2008 | The Sound of Music in My Heart | |
| 15th | 2009 | Dae Jang Geum | |
| 16th | 2010 | Hero | |
| 17th | 2011 | Sherlock Holmes | |
| 18th | 2012 | The Missing Crown Prince | La Cage aux Folles |
| 19th | 2013 | The Days | Les Misérables |

== Past Winners by Category ==
=== 1st Korea Musical Awards (1995) ===
1st Annual (1995) Korea Musical Awards Winners
| Category | Winner | Work / Company |
|---|---|---|
| Best Production | | I'm Gonna Be a Star (Acom Musical Production) |
| Best Director | Lee Jong-hoon | The Pupa (Maekto Theater Company) |
| Best Actor | Park Chul-ho | Jinggye Maenggye Neoreundeul (Seoul Arts Company) |
| Best Actress | Na Hyun-hee | I'm Gonna Be a Star (Acom Musical Production) |
| Best Playwright | Oh Eun-hee | The Pupa (Maekto Theater Company) |
| Best Composer | Kim Hyung-suk | I'm Gonna Be a Star (Acom Production) |
| Best Choreography | Seo Byung-gu | I'm Gonna Be a Star (Acom Production) |
| Best Stage Design | Park Dong-woo | I'm Gonna Be a Star (Acom Production) |
| Best Technical | Son Jin-sook | The Pupa (Maekto Theater Company) |
| Special Award | Choi Chang-kwon, Yoon Bok-hee, Kim Sung-won | N/A (Individual) |
| Best New Actor | Joo Won-sung | Grease Rock 'n' Roll (Shinshi Musical Company) |
| Best New Actress | Choi Jung-won | The Last Dance with Me (Shinwha Theater Company) |
| Popular Star Award | Nam Kyung-joo, Ha Hee-ra | The Last Dance with Me (Shinwha Theater Company) |

=== 2nd Korea Musical Awards (1996) ===
2nd Annual (1996) Korea Musical Awards Winners
| Category | Winner | Work / Company |
|---|---|---|
| Best Production | | The Last Empress (Acom Musical Production) |
| Best Director | Yoon Ho-jin | The Last Empress (Acom Musical Production) |
| Best Actor | Nam Kyung-eup | Love Rides the Rain (Seoul Musical Company) |
| Best Actress | Kim Sung-nyeo | Seven Brides (Shinshi Musical Company) |
| Best Supporting Actor | Kim Min-soo | The Last Empress (Acom Musical Production) |
| Best Supporting Actress | Choi Jung-won | Love Rides the Rain (Seoul Musical Company) |
| Best Playwright | Kim Jung-sook | Blue Saigon (Mosin Saramdeul Theater Company) |
| Best Music | Choi Gwi-seop | Love Rides the Rain (Seoul Musical Company) |
| Best Choreography | Kuk Soo-ho | Gwanggaeto the Great (Seoul Changmu Theater Company) |
| Best Stage Design | Park Dong-woo | The Last Empress (Acom Musical Production) |
| Best Technical | Kim Hyun-sook | The Last Empress (Acom Musical Production) |
| Best New Actor | Kim Beop-rae | Atlantis 2045 (Seoul Arts Company) |
| Best New Actress | Kim Jung-sook | Seven Brides (Shinshi Musical Company) |
| Popular Star Award | Yoon Seok-hwa, Nam Kyung-joo | The Last Empress (Acom Musical Production), Love Rides the Rain (Seoul Musical Company) |
| Special Award | Choi Yeon-ho | Stage Designer (Individual) |

=== 3rd Korea Musical Awards (1997) ===
3rd Annual (1997) Korea Musical Awards Winners
| Category | Winner | Work / Company |
|---|---|---|
| Grand Prize | | Winter Wanderer (Acom Musical Production) |
| Best Director | Bae Hae-il | Show Comedy (Seoul Musical Company) |
| Best Actor | Nam Kyung-joo | Whale Hunting (Hwan Performance) |
| Best Actress | Yoon Bok-hee | Padam Padam Padam (Yu Theater Company) |
| Best Supporting Actor | Song Yong-tae | Padam Padam Padam (Yu Theater Company) |
| Best Supporting Actress | Jeon Soo-kyung | Broadway 42nd Street (Samsung Video Business Group) |
| Best Music | Choi Jong-hyuk | Nowhere Are My Footprints Left (Seoul City Dance Troupe) |
| Best Choreography | Ahn Ae-soon | Nowhere Are My Footprints Left (Seoul City Dance Troupe) |
| Best Stage Design | Park Dong-woo | Winter Wanderer (Acom) |
| Best Technical | Kim Ki-young, Kim Young-soo | Show Comedy (Seoul Musical Company Sound), Broadway 42nd Street (Samsung Video Business Group Stage Manager) |
| Best New Actor | Seo Chang-woo | Winter Wanderer (Acom) |
| Best New Actress | Oh Jung-hae | Show Comedy (Seoul Musical Company) |
| Popular Star Award | Nam Kyung-joo, Kim Min-soo, Lee Jung-hwa, Choi Jung-won | N/A (Individual) |
| Special Award | Chae Kyung-ho | Winter Wanderer (Acom Special Effects), Broadway 42nd Street (Chorus Team) |

=== 4th Korea Musical Awards (1998) ===
4th Annual (1998) Korea Musical Awards Winners
| Category | Winner | Work / Company |
|---|---|---|
| Best Production | | Hanne (Seoul City Musical Company) |
| Best Director | Lee Jong-hoon | Hanne (Seoul City Musical Company) |
| Best Actor | Yoo Hee-sung | Simcheong (Seoul Arts Company), The Last Empress (Acom Production) |
| Best Actress | Kim Won-jung, Lee Tae-won | The Last Empress (Acom Production) |
| Best Supporting Actor | Kwak Eun-tae | Hanne (Seoul City Musical Company) |
| Best Supporting Actress | Lee Jung-hwa | Broadway 42nd Street (Samsung Video Business Group), Simcheong (Seoul Arts Company) |
| Best Music | Choi Chang-kwon, Choi Gwi-seop | Simcheong (Seoul Arts Company) |
| Best Stage Design | Yoon Jung-seop | Hanne (Seoul City Musical Company) |
| Best Technical | Lee Sang-bong | Simcheong (Seoul Arts Company Lighting) |
| Best New Actor | Ryu Jung-han | West Side Story (Samsung Video Business Group) |
| Best New Actress | Lee Ji-eun | Subway Line 1 (Hakjeon Theater Company) |
| Special Award | Kim Young-hwan, Hwan Performance, Oh Hyun-joo | The Last Empress (New York Performance Promotion Committee Chairman), Nanta, (Seoul Changmu Theater Company) |

=== 5th Korea Musical Awards (1999) ===
5th Annual (1999) Korea Musical Awards Winners
| Category | Winner | Work / Company |
|---|---|---|
| Best Production | | Anikkeng (Seoul Arts Company) |
| Best Director | Park Jong-sun | The Marriage of Figaro (Seoul City Musical Company) |
| Best Actor | Song Yong-tae | Anikkeng (Seoul Arts Company), Men's Nonsense (Seoul Musical Company) |
| Best Actress | Jeon Soo-kyung | Life (Shinshi Musical Company) |
| Best Supporting Actor | Lee In-chul | Guys and Dolls (Min Gwang-dae) |
| Best Supporting Actress | Lim Sun-ae | Hard Rock Cafe (Seoul Musical Company) |
| Best Music | Jung Chi-yong | Queen of Tears (Samsung Video Business Group) |
| Best Lyrics/Playwright | No applicable work | N/A |
| Best Choreography | Choi Chung-ja | Fiddler on the Roof (Seoul City Musical Company) |
| Best Stage Design/Costume | Byun Chang-soon | Bari - Forgotten Lullaby (Seoul Arts Company) |
| Best Technical | Lee Young-joo, Goo Yoo-jin | Dracula (Gatgaji Theater Company Technical Director), Life (Shinshi Musical Company Makeup) |
| Best Ensemble | | Life (Shinshi Musical Company Team) |
| Best New Actor | Oh Jae-ik | Hard Rock Cafe (Seoul Musical Company) |
| Best New Actress | Lee Hye-kyung | The Marriage of Figaro (Seoul City Musical Company) |
| Special Award | Kim Sang-yeol | N/A (Individual) |

=== 6th Korea Musical Awards (2000) ===
6th Annual (2000) Korea Musical Awards Winners
| Category | Winner | Work / Company |
|---|---|---|
| Best Production | | Typhoon (Seoul Arts Company) |
| Best Director | Han Jin-sup | Gambler (Shinshi Musical Company) |
| Best Actor | Heo Joon-ho | Gambler (Shinshi Musical Company) |
| Best Actress | Lee Jung-hwa | Typhoon (Seoul Arts Company) |
| Best Supporting Actor | Bang Jeong-sik | Fame (Acom Musical Production) |
| Best Supporting Actress | Ko Mi-kyung | Typhoon (Seoul Arts Company) |
| Best Music | Kim Dae-sung | Typhoon (Seoul Arts Company) |
| Best Writer/Playwright | No applicable work | N/A |
| Best Choreography | Park Il-gyu | Typhoon (Seoul Arts Company) |
| Best Stage Design/Costume | Lee Tae-seop | Rock Hamlet (Seoul Musical Company) |
| Best Technical | Kim Yoo-sun | Typhoon (Seoul Arts Company Makeup) |
| Best Ensemble | | Fame (Acom Musical Production Team) |
| Best New Actor | Jo Jeong-geun | Typhoon (Seoul Arts Company) |
| Best New Actress | Kim Sun-young | Fame (Acom Musical Production) |
| Special Award | Kim Min-ki, Choi Joo-bong | Hakjeon Theater Company Representative, Gagyo Representative (Individual) |

=== 7th Korea Musical Awards (2001) ===
7th Annual (2001) Korea Musical Awards Winners
| Category | Winner | Work / Company |
|---|---|---|
| Best Production | | No applicable work (N/A) |
| Best Director | Kim Chul-ri | Duet (Shinshi Musical Company) |
| Best Actor | Kim Sung-ki | Dracula (Gatgaji Theater Company) |
| Best Actress | Choi Jung-won | Chicago (Shinshi Musical Company) |
| Best Supporting Actor | Kim Jin-tae | Chicago (Shinshi Musical Company) |
| Best Supporting Actress | Bang Joo-ran | Brotherhood (Hakjeon Theater Company) |
| Best Music | Jung Min-sun | The Sorrows of Young Werther (Gatgaji Theater Company) |
| Best Lyrics/Playwright | Oh Eun-hee | Oh Happy Day (Seoul Musical Company) |
| Best Choreography | Jung Eun-jung | Chicago, Rent (Shinshi Musical Company) |
| Best Stage Design/Costume | Lee Soo-dong | Chicago, Rent, Duet (Shinshi Musical Company Costumes), All That Jazz (Star Search 21 Costumes) |
| Best Technical | Min Kyung-soo | Chicago, Roman Holiday (Shinshi Musical Company Lighting) |
| Best Ensemble | | Chicago (Shinshi Musical Company Team) |
| Best New Actor | Lee Kun-myung | Rent (Shinshi Musical Company) |
| Best New Actress | Kim Young-joo | Rent (Shinshi Musical Company) |
| Special Award | Ven. Jung Woo | Shinshi Musical Company Sponsor Chairman (Individual) |

=== 8th Korea Musical Awards (2002) ===
8th Annual (2002) Korea Musical Awards Winners
| Category | Winner | Work / Company |
|---|---|---|
| Best Production | | The Play (Intercommunity, Performance Bada) |
| Best Director | Lim Young-woong | Kiss Me, Kate (Shinshi Musical Company) |
| Best Actor | Yoo Jun-sang | The Play (Intercommunity, Performance Bada) |
| Best Actress | Jeon Soo-kyung | Kiss Me, Kate (Shinshi Musical Company) |
| Best Supporting Actor | Im Choon-gil | The Play (Intercommunity, Performance Bada) |
| Best Supporting Actress | Seo Ji-young | The Play (Intercommunity, Performance Bada) |
| Best Playwright | Kim Soo-kyung | The Play (Intercommunity, Performance Bada) |
| Best Choreography | Park Sang-gyu | Tommy (Daejung Theater Company) |
| Best Stage Design/Costume | Kim Jun-seop | Tick, Tick... Boom! (Shinshi Musical Company Stage Design) |
| Best Technical | Son Min-sik | Cabaret, Tick, Tick... Boom! (Shinshi Musical Company Stage Manager) |
| Best Ensemble | | Cabaret (Shinshi Musical Company Team) |
| Best New Actor | Yoon Young-seok | The Phantom of the Opera (Jemiro-RUG) |
| Best New Actress | Bae Hae-sun | The Rehearsal (OD Musical Company) |
| Popular Star Award | Nam Kyung-joo, Joo Won-sung, Heo Joon-ho, Kim Sun-kyung, Lee Hye-kyung, Choi Jung-won | N/A (Individual) |
| Best International Musical | | The Phantom of the Opera (Jemiro-RUG) |
| Special Award | Park Myung-sung, Yoon Dong-ha | Shinshi Musical Company Representative, Jungang Stage Representative (Individual) |

=== 9th Korea Musical Awards (2003) ===
9th Annual (2003) Korea Musical Awards Winners
| Category | Winner | Work / Company |
|---|---|---|
| Best Production | | Romeo and Juliet (Seoul Arts Company) |
| Best Director | Yoo Hee-sung | Romeo and Juliet (Seoul Arts Company) |
| Best Actor | Kim Jang-seop | Love Rides the Rain (OD Musical Company) |
| Best Actress | Seo Ji-young | Footloose (Daejung Musical Company) |
| Best Supporting Actor | Jo Seung-ryong | Mongyudowondo (Acom International) |
| Best Supporting Actress | Lee Kyung-mi | Urinetown (Shinshi Musical Company) |
| Best Music | Deniac Bartok | Romeo and Juliet (Seoul Arts Company) |
| Best Choreography | Sarah Byun | Footloose (Daejung Musical Company) |
| Best Stage Design/Costume | Chun Kyung-soon, Ha Sung-ok | The Morning of Goryeo (Seoul Arts Company Stage Design) |
| Best Technical | Lee Jong-il | Typhoon (Seoul Arts Company Technical Director) |
| Best Ensemble | | Footloose (Daejung Musical Company Team) |
| Best New Actor | Min Young-ki | Romeo and Juliet (Seoul Arts Company) |
| Best New Actress | Jo Jung-eun | Romeo and Juliet (Seoul Arts Company) |
| Popular Star Award | Nam Kyung-joo, Lee Kun-myung, Kim Sun-kyung, Lee Hye-kyung | N/A (Individual) |
| Best International Musical | | Urinetown (Shinshi Musical Company) |
| Special Award | Ulsan Metropolitan City | Cheoyong (Musical Production) |

=== 10th Korea Musical Awards (2004) ===
10th Annual (2004) Korea Musical Awards Winners
| Category | Winner | Work / Company |
|---|---|---|
| Best Production | | Maria Maria |
| Best International Musical | | Mamma Mia! |
| Beautiful Musical Award | Acom International Co., Ltd. | N/A (Company Award) |
| Best Director | Yoon Seok-hwa | Saturday Night Fever |
| Best Planning | Park Myung-sung | Shinshi Musical Company Representative (Individual) |
| Best Playwright | Yoo Hye-jung | Maria Maria |
| Best Music | Cha Kyung-chan | Maria Maria |
| Best Choreography | Seo Jung-sun | Carmen |
| Best Technical | Kim Mi-kyung | Grease |
| Best Ensemble | | Saturday Night Fever |
| Best Actor | Jo Seung-woo | Jekyll & Hyde |
| Best Actress | Kang Hyo-sung | Maria Maria |
| Best Supporting Actor | Lee Seok-jun | Blues Brothers |
| Best Supporting Actress | Moon Hee-kyung | Beauty and the Beast |
| Best New Actor | Park Gun-hyung | Saturday Night Fever |
| Best New Actress | Sonya | Jekyll & Hyde |
| Male Popularity Award | Nam Kyung-joo | Peppermint |
| Female Popularity Award | Kim Sun-kyung | The King and I |

=== 11th Korea Musical Awards (2005) ===
11th Annual (2005) Korea Musical Awards Winners
| Category | Winner | Work / Company |
|---|---|---|
| Best Director | Han Jin-sup | Seol & Company, CJ E&M |
| Best Actor | Oh Man-seok | Hedwig and the Angry Inch (Shownote) |
| Best Actress | Bae Hae-sun | Aida (Shinshi Musical Company, CJ E&M, MBC) |
| Best Supporting Actor | Kim Jae-man | Man of La Mancha (OD Musical Company) |
| Best Supporting Actress | Jung Young-joo | Bat Boy: The Musical (Shinshi Musical Company) |
| Best Music | Park Yong-jeon | The Lower Depths (Jase Repertory Theater Company) |
| Best Lyrics/Playwright | Choo Min-joo | Laundry (Myungrang Theater Subak) |
| Best Choreography | Lee Ran-young | Hard Rock Cafe - Lost In Paradise (Seoul Musical Company) |
| Best Stage Design/Costume | Seo Sook-jin | Jesus Christ Superstar (Seol & Company, RUC, CJ E&M Stage) |
| Best Technical | Yoo Seok-yong | Aida (Shinshi Musical Company, CJ E&M, MBC Technical Director) |
| Best Ensemble | | Aida (Shinshi Musical Company, CJ E&M, MBC Technical Director) |
| Best New Actor | Kim Soo-yong | Bat Boy: The Musical (Shinshi Musical Company) |
| Best New Actress | Ock Joo-hyun | Aida (Shinshi Musical Company, CJ E&M, MBC) |
| Popular Star Award | Oh Man-seok, Lee Young-mi | N/A (Individual) |
| Best International Musical | | Seol & Company, CJ E&M |
| Producer Award | Kim Yong-hyun | Seoul Musical Company Representative (Individual) |

=== 12th Korea Musical Awards (2006) ===
12th Annual (2006) Korea Musical Awards Winners
| Category | Winner | Work / Company |
|---|---|---|
| Best Production | | Oh! While You Were Sleeping (Yeonwoo Stage Company) |
| Best Director | Lee Yoon-taek | Dreaming in Hwaseong (Gyeonggi Arts Center) |
| Best Actor | Song Yong-tae | The Producers (Seol & Company, CJ E&M) |
| Best Actress | Oh Na-ra | Finding Kim Jong-wook (CJ E&M, Musical Heaven Production) |
| Best Supporting Actor | Lee Hee-jung | The Producers (Seol & Company, CJ E&M) |
| Best Supporting Actress | Kim Sun-kyung | The Producers (Seol & Company, CJ E&M) |
| Best Music | Kang Sang-gu | Dreaming in Hwaseong (Gyeonggi Arts Center) |
| Best Playwright | Jang Yoo-jung | Oh! While You Were Sleeping (Yeonwoo Stage Company) |
| Best Choreography | Ahn Ae-soon | The Land of Wind (Seoul Arts Company) |
| Best Stage Design | Hwang Yeon-hee | The Sword of Fire (Cocosm Costumes) |
| Best Technical | Gu Yoon-young | The Land of Wind (Seoul Arts Company Lighting) |
| Best Ensemble | | Miss Saigon (KCMI, Chosun Ilbo, DAUM Team) |
| Best New Actor | Kim Da-hyun | Fall in Love (Cineline-Two) |
| Best New Actress | Yoon Gong-joo | Dracula (Dain Culture, Bada Musical Company) |
| Popular Star Award | Oh Man-seok, Kim So-hyun | N/A (Individual) |
| Best International Musical | | Miss Saigon (KCMI, Chosun Ilbo, DAUM) |
| Producer Award | Seol Do-yoon | Motis Performance Business General Director, Seol & Company CEO (Individual) |

=== 13th Korea Musical Awards (2007) ===
13th Korea Musical Awards Winners
| Category | Winner | Work / Company |
|---|---|---|
| Best Production | | Dancing Shadows (Shinshi Musical Company) |
| Best Director | Kim Dal-joong | The Spitfire Grill (Chungmu Art Hall, Shownote, CJ E&M) |
| Best Actor | Ryu Jung-han | Thrill Me (Musical Heaven) |
| Best Actress | Kim Sun-young | Evita (Seol & Company, RUG, CJ E&M) |
| Best Supporting Actor | Sung Ki-yoon | Dancing Shadows (Shinshi Musical Company) |
| Best Supporting Actress | Lee Hye-kyung | The Spitfire Grill (Chungmu Art Hall, Shownote, CJ E&M) |
| Best Composer | Jang So-young | Singles (Ak-eo Company, OD Musical Company, CJK E&M) |
| Best Music | Park Kal-in | Dancing Shadows (Shinshi Musical Company) |
| Best Playwright | Park Yong-jeon | Audition (Open Run Musical Company) |
| Best Choreography | Chris Bailey | Dancing Shadows (Shinshi Musical Company) |
| Best Stage Design | Park Sung-min | Singles (Ak-eo Company, OD Musical Company, CJ E&M) |
| Best Technical | Kwon Do-kyung | Annie (Sejong Center for the Performing Arts, Seoul City Musical Company Sound) |
| Best Ensemble | | Dancing Shadows (Shinshi Musical Company Team) |
| Best New Actor | Kim Do-hyun | Singles (Ak-eo Company, OD Musical Company, CJ E&M) |
| Best New Actress | Lee Min-a | Haehwa (Janggang) |
| Popular Star Award | Oh Man-seok, Jo Seung-woo, Oh Na-ra, Yoon Gong-joo | N/A (Individual) |
| Best International Musical | | Annie (Sejong Center for the Performing Arts, Seoul City Musical Company) |
| Producer Award | Song Seung-hwan | PMC Production CEO (Individual) |

=== 14th Korea Musical Awards (2008) ===
14th Annual (2008) Korea Musical Awards Winners
| Category | Winner | Work / Company |
|---|---|---|
| Best Production | | The Sound of Music in My Heart (Showtic Communications) |
| Best Director | Jo Kwang-hwa | The Sound of Music in My Heart (Showtic Communications) |
| Best Actor | Kim Beop-rae | Notre Dame de Paris (NDPK) |
| Best Actress | Kim So-hyun | My Fair Lady (Trypro, OD Musical Company) |
| Best Supporting Actor | Seo Beom-seok | Notre Dame de Paris (NDPK) |
| Best Supporting Actress | Park Jun-myeon | See What I Wanna See (Musical Heaven, CJ E&M) |
| Best Composer | Kim Moon-jung, Choi Joo-young | The Sound of Music in My Heart (Showtic Communications) |
| Best Music | Lee Na-young | See What I Wanna See (Musical Heaven, CJ E&M) |
| Best Playwright | Lee Hee-jun | The Sound of Music in My Heart (Showtic Communications) |
| Best Choreography | David Swan | My Fair Lady (Trypro, OD Musical Company) |
| Best Stage Design | Jung Seung-ho | The Sound of Music in My Heart (Showtic Communications) |
| Best Technical | Baek Si-won | Sweeney Todd (Musical Heaven Lighting) |
| Best Ensemble | | Notre Dame de Paris (NDPK) |
| Best New Actor | Jo Jung-seok | The Sound of Music in My Heart (Showtic Communications) |
| Best New Actress | Bada | Notre Dame de Paris (NDPK) |
| Popular Star Award | Yoon Hyeong-ryeol, Bada | N/A (Individual) |
| Best International Musical | | Hairspray (Shinshi Musical Company, Chungmu Art Hall, SBS) |
| Producer Award | Yoon Ho-jin | Acom International Representative (Individual) |

=== 15th Korea Musical Awards (2009) ===
15th Korea Musical Awards Winners
| Category | Winner | Work / Company |
|---|---|---|
| Best Production | | Dae Jang Geum (MBC, PMC Production) |
| Best Director | Lee Ji-na | Dae Jang Geum (MBC, PMC Production) |
| Best Actor | Kim Mu-yeol | Spring Awakening (Musical Heaven, CJ E&M) |
| Best Actress | Hong Ji-min | Dreamgirls (OD Musical Company, CJ E&M, Charlotte Theater) |
| Best Supporting Actor | Jo Jung-seok | Spring Awakening (Musical Heaven, CJ E&M) |
| Best Supporting Actress | Kim Kyung-sun | Zanna, Don't! (Shinshi Musical Company, Interpark INT, Sejong Center for the Performing Arts) |
| Best Composer | Lee Ji-soo | The Peculiar Suicide Journey (Showfact) |
| Best Music | Won Mi-sol | Dreamgirls (OD Musical Company, i-company Theater Company, CJ E&M) |
| Best Playwright | Park In-sun | Special Letter (Ak-eo Company, i-company Theater Company, CJ E&M) |
| Best Choreography | Choi In-sook | Romeo and Juliet (S-guk Entertainment) |
| Best Stage Design | Robin Wagner | Dreamgirls (OD Musical Company, CJ E&M, Charlotte Theater Stage) |
| Best Technical | Noh Byung-woo | Dreamgirls (OD Musical Company, CJ E&M, Charlotte Theater Stage) |
| Best Ensemble | | Spring Awakening (Musical Heaven, CJ E&M) |
| Best New Actor | Park Dong-ha | Broadway 42nd Street (CJ E&M, Seol & Company) |
| Best New Actress | Im Hye-young | Broadway 42nd Street (CJ E&M, Seol & Company) |
| Popular Star Award | Hong Kwang-ho, Bada | N/A (Individual) |
| Best International Musical | | Dreamgirls (OD Musical Company, CJ E&M, Charlotte Theater) |
| Producer Award | Shin Choon-soo | OD Musical Company Representative (Individual) |

=== 16th Korea Musical Awards (2010) ===
The 17th Korea Musical Awards ceremony was held on October 18, 2010, at 5:20 PM, at KBS Hall in Seoul.

16th Annual (2010) Korea Musical Awards Winners
| Category | Winner | Work / Company |
|---|---|---|
| Best Production | | Hero (Acom International) |
| Best International Musical | | Billy Elliot (Magistella) |
| Best Actor | Jung Sung-hwa | Hero |
| Best Actress | Choi Jung-won | Kiss Me, Kate |
| Best Supporting Actor | Choi Min-chul | Monte Cristo |
| Best Supporting Actress | Jung Young-joo | Billy Elliot |
| Best New Actor | Kim Jun-su, Kim Se-yong, Lee Ji-myung, Lim Sun-woo, Jung Jin-ho | Mozart!, Billy Elliot |
| Best New Actress | Cha Ji-yeon | Seopyeonje |
| Best Ensemble | | Kiss Me, Kate (Shinshi Company) |
| Best Director | Yoon Ho-jin | Hero |
| Best Composer | Kim Dong-sung | Namhansanseong |
| Best Music | Peter Casey | Hero |
| Best Playwright | Han Ah-reum | Hero |
| Best Choreography | Seo Byung-gu | All That Jazz |
| Best Stage Design | Park Dong-woo | Hero |
| Best Technical | Kim Yu-seon | Mozart! |
| Popular Star Award | Kim Jun-su, Jung Sun-ah | N/A (Individual) |
| Special Award | Seongnam Arts Center | N/A (Organization) |

=== 17th Korea Musical Awards (2011) ===
The 17th Korea Musical Awards ceremony was held on Monday, November 14, 2011, at 5:20 PM, at Olympic Hall inside Olympic Park in Seoul, hosted by Lee Hyun-woo and SBS announcer Yoo Hye-young.

17th Annual (2011) Korea Musical Awards Winners
| Category | Winner | Work / Company |
|---|---|---|
| Best Production | | Sherlock Holmes |
| Best International Musical | | Spamalot |
| Best Actor | Kim Woo-hyung | Aida |
| Best Actress | Jo Jung-eun | Pimatgol Love Song |
| Best Supporting Actor | Lee Kun-myung | Jack the Ripper |
| Best Supporting Actress | Goo Won-young | Gwanghwamun Sonata |
| Best New Actor | Park Eun-tae | Pimatgol Love Song |
| Best New Actress | Song Sang-eun | Spring Awakening |
| Best Ensemble | | Guys and Dolls |
| Popular Star Award | Yoon Gong-joo; Kim Jun-su | Tears of Heaven; Mozart! · Tears of Heaven |
| Best Music | Um Ki-young | Turandot |
| Best Composer | Choi Jong-yoon | Sherlock Holmes |
| Best Playwright | Noh Woo-sung | Sherlock Holmes |
| Best Director | Kim Hyo-kyung | Turandot |
| Best Stage/Art Design | Yeo Shin-dong | Moby Dick |
| Best Technical | Kwon Do-kyung | Jack the Ripper |
| Best Choreography | Oh Jae-ik | Temptation of Wolves |

=== 18th Korea Musical Awards (2012) ===
The 18th Korea Musical Awards ceremony was held on Monday, October 29, 2012, at 5:20 PM, at Olympic Hall inside Olympic Park in Seoul.

18th Annual (2012) Korea Musical Awards Winners
| Category | Winner | Work / Company |
|---|---|---|
| Best Original Musical | | The Missing Crown Prince |
| Best International Musical | | La Cage aux Folles |
| Best Actor | Kim Jun-su | Elisabeth |
| Best Actress | Ock Joo-hyun | Elisabeth |
| Best Supporting Actor | Kim Ho-young | La Cage aux Folles |
| Best Supporting Actress | Oh So-yeon | Next to Normal |
| Best New Actor | Kai | A Tale of Two Cities |
| Best New Actress | Ivy | Chicago |
| Best Ensemble | | La Cage aux Folles |
| Popular Star Award | Kim Jun-su; Kim Sun-young | N/A (Individual/Multiple Works) |
| Best Music | Will Aronson | Music for Bungee Jump |
| Best Playwright | Oh Mi-young | Finding the Family |
| Best Director | Seo Jae-hyung | The Missing Crown Prince |
| Best Stage/Technical | Min Kyung-soo | A Tale of Two Cities (Lighting) |
| Best Choreography | Seo Byung-gu | La Cage aux Folles |

=== 19th Korea Musical Awards (2013) ===
The 19th Korea Musical Awards ceremony was held on Monday, October 7, 2013, at 5:20 PM, at the Grand Peace Hall of Kyung Hee University in Hoegi-dong, Dongdaemun-gu, Seoul.

19th Annual (2013) Korea Musical Awards Winners
| Category | Winner | Work / Company |
|---|---|---|
| Best Original Musical | | The Days |
| Best International Musical | | Les Misérables |
| Best Actor | Jung Sung-hwa | Les Misérables |
| Best Actress | Jung Sun-ah | Aida |
| Best Supporting Actor | Lee Ji-hoon | Elisabeth |
| Best Supporting Actress | Park Jun-myeon | Les Misérables |
| Best New Actor | Jeon Dong-seok | The Moon Embracing the Sun |
| Best New Actress | Park Ji-yeon | Les Misérables |
| Best Ensemble | | Broadway 42nd Street |
| Popular Star Award | Jo Seung-woo Kim Jun-su Kim So-hyun Ock Joo-hyun | N/A (Individual/Multiple Works) |
| Best Music | Won Mi-sol | The Moon Embracing the Sun |
| Best Playwright | Han Jeong-seok | The Goddess Is Watching |
| Best Director | Jang Yoo-jung | The Days |
| Best Stage/Technical | Kang Guk-hyun | The Man Who Walks Through Walls |
| Best Choreography | Oh Jae-ik Jeong Do-young | The Days |
