= Kiyotaka Imai =

Japanese actor and singer

Kiyotaka Imai (今井 清隆, Imai Kiyotaka; born November 5, 1957) is a Japanese actor and singer who starred in the musicals Evita, The Phantom of the Opera, and Les Misérables.

== Songs ==
- Hyakujuu Sentai Gaoranger: "I.D. ~GaoHunter Requiem~" (Ｉ．Ｄ． ~ガオハンター レクイエム~, Ai Dii Gaohantā Rekuiemu)
