= Light Yagami =

Fictional character from Death Note

- Death Note character
- Light Yagami, drawn by Takeshi Obata
- First appearance: "Boredom" (退屈, Taikutsu) (2004)
- Last appearance: "Curtain" (幕, Maku) (2006)
- Created by: Tsugumi Ohba; Takeshi Obata
- Portrayed by: Tatsuya Fujiwara (Japanese films); Kenji Urai (musical); Hayato Kakizawa (musical); Masataka Kubota (TV series); Nat Wolff (American film)
- Voiced by: Mamoru Miyano (Japanese); Brad Swaile (English)

In-universe information
- Aliases: Kira; Light Asahi (朝日月, Asahi Raito); L (from chapter 60 onward)
- Nickname: Kira
- Species: Human
- Gender: Male
- Occupation: Student; Police Detective; Vigilante
- Weapon: Death Note
- Family: Soichiro Yagami (father); Sachiko Yagami (mother); Sayu Yagami (sister)
- Significant others: Misa Amane; Kiyomi Takada
- Nationality: Japanese

Light Yagami (Japanese: 夜神 月(ライト), Hepburn: Yagami Raito) is the main protagonist of the manga series Death Note, created by Tsugumi Ohba and Takeshi Obata. He is portrayed as a brilliant but bored genius who finds the Death Note, a supernatural notebook that allows the user to kill anyone by knowing their name and face, after it is dropped by the Shinigami Ryuk. With the power of the Death Note, Light eliminates those he deems morally unworthy of life, masterminding a worldwide massacre as the mass murderer Kira (キラ). He claims that he is making the world a better place by purging it of all its crime and impurities, taking the stance of the "God of the new world" and thus fulfilling his goal, although his massacre involved a significant amount of innocent civilians or law officers. Over the course of his efforts to create a world free of crime, wherein he would rule as a godlike figure, Yagami is pursued by law enforcement groups such as the NPA and a world-renowned detective named L.

In the anime adaptation, he is voiced by Mamoru Miyano in Japanese and by Brad Swaile in the English version. In the live-action film series, he is portrayed by Tatsuya Fujiwara with Swaile reprising his role as his English dub voice; he is portrayed by both Kenji Urai and Hayato Kakizawa in the musical; in the TV drama, he is portrayed by Masataka Kubota; his counterparts in the American film are portrayed by Nat Wolff and Margaret Qualley. Yagami's portrayal in the anime was met with praise from critics.

== Creation and conception ==
Tsugumi Ohba, the story writer of Death Note said that his editor suggested the family name "Yagami" for Light, which he did not feel "too concerned" about regarding its meaning (the Kanji for "Yagami" are "night" and "god"). Light's given name is written with the Japanese character for "moon," an example of what is coincidentally called a kira kira name. In the final scene of the manga, after Light's death, a group of Kira worshippers appear under the light of the moon; Ohba describes liking this scene as it created "deeper significance" for Light's name.

Takeshi Obata, the artist of Death Note, said that he had "no trouble" designing Light as the character description presented to him, "A brilliant honors student who's a little out there," was "clear and detailed". As the weekly serialization continued, Obata simplified the design by subconsciously removing "unnecessary" lines and felt that he became "better" at drawing Light. When Chapter 35 appeared and the editor informed Obata that Light loses his memories, Obata had to draw Light in a similar manner as he appeared in Chapter 1; Obata said "It was like I had to forget everything I had learned." Obata said that he used "a lot of effort" to design Light's wardrobe. According to Obata, he encountered difficulty imagining the clothing of "a brilliant person," so he looked through fashion magazines. Obata envisioned Light as a "smart and formal guy" who wears formal shirts. Most of Light's clothing in Death Note is "fitted", and Obata avoided jeans. For color illustrations, Obata assigned "a lack of color or clear" to Light, as he felt these color themes best fit his "atmosphere".

Light's character was slightly altered as he was adapted into the anime. Toshiki Inoue, the series organizer for the anime, confirmed in an interview that the anime production team intended to portray Light as "pitiful", as well as confirming an intent to portray his death more sympathetically than in the manga. As stated by Inoue and the anime producers, Light's death scene in the anime came to emphasize the pathos of "a sad person" who ruined his own life. Similarly, Mamoru Miyano, Light's voice actor, felt "sad" and "empty" during the recording process, especially as he was able to more strongly empathize with his character. He indicates that Light, without ever truly realizing it, became hollow as a consequence of his own actions.

=== Films ===
Shusuke Kaneko, director of the film, intended for Light to appear sympathetic at the beginning of the film; when Light first gains the Death Note, Kaneko "was careful" to have Light react in a manner "as you and I would". Kaneko changed the story involving Light gaining his first notebook as he felt that the audience "would have a hard time sympathizing" with Light if the scene remained the same as it was in the manga. Kaneko added that as he portrayed Light as "being enthralled" as he "becomes more cruel" to make the audience members feel that they could "do the terrible things he does" even if the members do not sympathize with Light.

Tatsuya Fujiwara said that he felt difficulty portraying Light Yagami in the film series because of the lack of "action" and because Light has no signature mannerisms and therefore has his feelings displayed by his face; Fujiwara added that he struggled conveying Light's "incredible intelligence" and that the performance would appear "very empty or simplistic" if Light received an improper portrayal. Fujiwara explained that he wanted Light to cry in a particular scene even though Kaneko told Fujiwara "Light doesn't cry" since Fujiwara believed that the scene would feel "more honest"; Kaneko used the take.

Kaneko designed Light's room to reflect the character's personality by making it clean and neat and filling it with legal, criminal history, foreign, and academic books. The original version of Light's room included a stereo; Kaneko replaced it with a vacuum cleaner to reflect Light's "clean-freak self".

Kenichi Matsuyama, the actor who portrayed L, said that he and Fujiwara became "so immersed" in their character portrayals that they did not talk to one another while on the set; when filming ceased they conversed and "went out for a drink or two". Matsuyama also said that Light and L are "extremely" alike in that they have "a very strong sense of justice".

== Appearances ==
=== In Death Note ===
Light as he appears in the anime series.

Light Yagami was born on February 28, 1986 (or 1989 in the anime). He is portrayed as a teenage genius with a polite and reserved demeanor, who is popular among his peers and teachers. At the beginning of the story, Light is a student in his last year of high school; he later attends To-Oh University (東応大学, Tōō Daigaku). His father, Soichiro Yagami, is the chief of the National Police Agency, and is the head of the task force hunting for "Kira", the name the public has given to the perpetrator of a string of inexplicable murders around the world. His mother, Sachiko, is a housewife. His younger sister, Sayu, acts as a cheerful, less academic foil of Light himself.

Light initially becomes horrified at the Death Note's abilities after he tests the notebook on two criminals out of curiosity, but he eventually convinces himself that the criminals' resulting deaths were justified, thinking he would bring crime rates down around the world. Light soon becomes driven to lead a personal crusade to rid the world of crime by using the notebook. While his agenda originates with good intentions, Light eventually finds himself killing law enforcement and even innocents in order to elude capture. His ethics are utilitarian, justifying the most extreme acts in service of his cause. He is also driven by a need for victory, which motivates most of his cruelest acts. Combined with the power of the Death Note, his hubris and genius-level intellect convince him that only he can save the world.

Eventually, a small task force of Japanese police officers, including Light's father, under the direction of the eccentric genius detective L begin to close in on Light. Although he suspects Light is Kira, L allows him to collaborate with the police on the case. This begins a game of cat and mouse between the two, with Light trying to learn L's real name so he can kill him, and L trying to get Light to expose himself so that he can arrest him. Because the actions of Misa Amane, a fervent Kira supporter and fellow Death Note owner, nearly implicates Light, he becomes compelled to temporarily relinquish ownership of his notebook and subsequently loses his memories of using the Death Note. It is during this time that Light reverts to his original persona: a caring and level-headed individual unwilling to manipulate others or commit or justify acts of crime, such as murder. After Light regains ownership of his notebook and his memories, he manipulates Misa's Shinigami Rem into killing L. Light then assumes the "L" persona and continues his charade of searching for Kira with the task force while carrying out the killings himself with help from Misa.

Over four years later, Light has been able to garner most of the world's support, and his followers have begun to worship Kira as a deity. However, it is around this time that two of L's protégés, Mello and Near, begin their investigation against Kira. Near heads the SPK (Special Provision for Kira), an American investigation team composed of CIA and FBI agents, while Mello works with the Mafia. Although Mello dies working separately from Near, his actions lead Teru Mikami, a man selected by Light to kill criminals using another Death Note, to make a mistake that results in Light's capture by Near, the SPK, and Japanese police. Seeing that Light has finally lost, he is killed when Ryuk writes his name in his own Death Note, just as the Shinigami had warned when they first met. Light Yagami dies on January 28, 2010 (or 2013 in the anime).

=== In film ===
==== Japanese film series ====
Tatsuya Fujiwara as Light in the Death Note film series.

In the Japanese film series, Light Yagami is portrayed by Tatsuya Fujiwara, known for his role as Shuya Nanahara in Battle Royale. In the films, he is portrayed as a distinguished, popular and intellectually gifted college student, who has a disregard and frustration of the incapability of the law enforcement system to quell the rampant increase in criminal activities around the world, which drives his motives to use the Death Note, to change the world into a utopian society without crime, under the alias of a god-like vigilante known as "Kira", much like his manga counterpart. However, some slight changes and modifications were made to the character. At the film's beginning, Light is a first-year law student at a university, instead of still being in high school as in the beginning of the manga and anime. Light's motives also slightly differ; in this version, he uses the Death Note mainly out of his frustration from the perceived failures of the Japanese justice system. Light, prior to his discovery of the Death Note, hacks into the national police database and finds that the government is unable to prosecute many criminals, either due to lack of evidence or technical loop-holes, among other reasons. Also, Light discovers the Death Note in an alley during a rainy night after encountering an acquitted felon named Takuo Shibuimaru in a night-club. Another difference is that Light meets Ryuk right after killing Shibuimaru with the Death Note. At the end of the first movie, Light kills his girlfriend, Shiori Akino, and frames her death as a murder and reason to foster hatred for "Kira", in order to join the Kira investigation team as a result of their sympathy.

Light relinquishes ownership of the Death Note to Kiyomi Takada. After Takada is caught, Light kills her to recover the Death Note, but it is taken by the investigation team. L states that he will test the 13-Day Rule, a fake Death Note rule designed to prove Light and Misa's innocence. Rem, knowing that L's actions will reveal Misa's identity as the second Kira, writes both L and his handler: Watari's names in the Death Note. Light then proceeds to write his father's name in the book, manipulating his father to return the confiscated Death Note. Light confronts his father, but Soichiro does not die. The investigation team members, including L, reveal themselves. Having already written his own name in the Death Note, thus negating Rem's actions, L tells Light that he had just written in a fake note. Light tries to write on a hidden piece of Death Note, but is shot by Matsuda, an investigation team member. Light tells Ryuk to write the team's names, promising to show him many interesting things, and begins to laugh. He stops, however, when Ryuk shows him that he had written just one name: Light's. Light tries to stop Ryuk, but merely passes right through him. As Light begins to succumb to the effects of the Death Note, Ryuk takes this opportunity to reveal to him that humans that have used the Death Note are barred from entering either Heaven or Hell, instead spending eternity in nothingness. Light dies in his father's arms, begging him to believe that he acted as Kira to put the justice, which Soichiro had taught him since his childhood, into practice.

Several years after Light's death, however, it is revealed in the sequel film Death Note: Light Up the New World that Light secretly had a son, (Note: The son's name is written "夜神光". While 夜神 is Yagami, the film does not state how the character "光", the boy's given name, is pronounced.) who was expected to inherit a Death Note and carry on Kira's legacy. Mikami kills the son over control of the notebook, and is then killed by police officer Tsukuru Mishima who decides to use the notebook to continue Light's work in ridding the world of crime. During the course of the film, Mishima is eventually caught by the police and he willingly turns himself in and the notebook to the authorities, seemingly thus ending Kira's legacy. A mid-credits scene reveals a video recorded by Light addressing the film's events to have occurred just as he has expected them to.

==== American film ====
In the American film adaptation, Light Yagami is adapted as two separate characters: Light Turner (portrayed by Nat Wolff) and Mia Sutton (portrayed by Margaret Qualley).

- Light Turner is a Seattle high school student who is an intelligent yet quiet and socially introverted teenager, who on stumbling across the mystical Death Note, eventually decides to use the notebook's god-like abilities to commit a worldwide massacre, in order to change the world into a utopian society without crime, under the alias of a literal human deity: "Kira", while being hunted down by an elite task-force of law enforcement officials within Seattle, led by an enigmatic international detective known as L and his own father, veteran Seattle police detective: James Turner. In this adaptation, Light has vast character differences from his manga counterpart, lacks much of the sociopathic, malicious and ruthless qualities of the original character (which are instead adapted to the counterpart character Mia Sutton), is more naive, sympathetic and idealistic, does not have a sister and has lost his mother in a hit-and-run incident, which partially serves as his inspiration to operate as Kira. He has a close yet somewhat strained relationship with his father and while considered academically gifted by peers and authorities, is not a popular student and is considered as a social outsider and lacks friends. Unlike his manga counterpart, he is also far less charismatic and confident, but more morally driven and demonstrates a reluctance to murder innocents and law enforcement individuals attempting to capture him, while eventually demonstrating a more darker, morally ambiguous, cunning and meticulous personality, towards the film's ending. Furthermore, instead of obtaining the notebook by chance, Ryuk deliberately hands Light the Death Note, in order to entertain himself and to see how an indifferent high schooler would utilize the Death Note's god-like abilities.
- Mia Sutton (based on the sociopathic qualities of Light Yagami) is Light's girlfriend, a classmate who assists Light in his activities as "Kira", before supplanting him as Kira.

After being enticed to kill a bully by Ryuk, Light murders the criminal who killed his mother, and together with Mia, the two begin a crusade similar to their manga counterparts to rid the world of crime. However the pair eventually come to a disagreement on how they should deal with law enforcement targeting them, including L and Light's father James, with Mia wishing to kill the "innocent" seeking to uncover their identities, and Light wishing to simply kill criminals. After Mia kills Watari, L's handler, she schemes to steal the notebook from Light, but Light outmaneuvers her and kills her, concocting an elaborate plan through the Death Note by manipulating a number of criminals to continue his activities as "Kira" through the notebook, before all of them commit suicide and induces himself into a medical coma for around a month, which seemingly proves Light's innocence to the authorities. At the end of the film, James presents Light with evidence that he killed his mother's murderer and Light confesses to being Kira and reveals how he cleared himself of suspicion. Meanwhile, L, disgraced by his superiors due to failing to implicate Light and seeking to avenge Watari, considers killing Light with a hidden piece of the notebook he finds in Mia's room, after having deduced her to have been the Kira who killed Watari, and recognising the supernatural to be real. The film ends, as Ryuk laughs to a bed-ridden Light and comments that "humans are so interesting".

=== In other media ===
In the 2015 drama, Masataka Kubota plays the role of Light Yagami. Similar to the Netflix adaptation, Light is portrayed as less charismatic, insecure and is initially hesitant to kill law enforcement. His relationship with his father Soichiro is also strained due to the death of his mother prior to the start of the series. However, in the later half of the series he grows to demonstrate the same level of ruthlessness, intellect and hubris as his manga counterpart.

Like the Netflix adaption, Light does not obtain the notebook by chance and it is given to him by Ryuk in response to a confrontation with a bully. After he writes the bully's name in the Death Note and realizes it is real, he is so horrified by what he did that almost commits suicide. After again using the notebook to save his father from being held hostage, Light proceeds to use the notebook to kill criminals as Kira. In response to the killings, the detective L leads a police task force alongside Light's father Soichiro to capture Kira. Toward the end of the series, L and Soichiro see through Light's deception and each attempt to convince him to turn himself in. When Light refuses to relent, he is baited into confessing after L and Soichiro both sacrifice their lives. The information obtained from their deaths is relayed to the police task force, who ambush Light in a warehouse in a sting operation led by L's successor Near. In a desperate attempt to help him evade capture, Light's accomplice Teru Mikami sets fire to the warehouse but Light is instead trapped by the fire and burns to death.

In the musical adaptation, Light is portrayed by Kenji Urai and Hayato Kakizawa in the Japanese productions and Hong Kwang-ho and Han Ji-sang in the Korean productions. Singaporean actor Xander Pang was cast as Light for the British production in 2026.

Light also appears alongside Ryuk as a non-playable story character for the crossover video game Jump Force, with Mamoru Miyano reprising his role as Light. He allies himself with the game's heroes until he acquires an Umbra Cube, a tool utilized by the game's antagonists, in order to replace the power of the Death Note that he lost before the game's events.

== Reception ==
=== Analysis ===
Ohba described Light as a victim of the Death Note, with Light's life being "ruined" once he obtained it. According to Ohba, Light was "a young man who could understand the pain of others" when he first encountered the Death Note. Ohba said that if Ryuk never developed an interest in the human world, Light would have become "one of the greatest police leaders in the world" who, with L, worked against criminals. He added that he believed that debating whether Light's actions were good or evil is not "very important". Ohba said that he personally sees Light as a "very evil" character. Obata said that Light was his second favorite human character and that he was not sure whether that was because he "liked" Light or because he drew "such an evil character" in a magazine for children.

According to Ohba, Light sees Misa Amane, whom he uses as an accomplice, as a "bad person" who killed people, so he acts emotionally cold towards her and manipulates her, although he pretends to love her, and even says he will marry her. He is only stopped from killing her by the shinigami Rem, who threatens to kill him if she dies earlier than her life span ends or if he tries to kill her, despite her knowledge that doing so will cause her own death.

Although Light, bearing love for his family and "humanity as a whole", had good intentions to transform the world into "a better place", he was also "very conceited", with a "warped ... desire to be godlike". Ohba also states that Light, "uncompromising" when achieving his ideals, "sullied" himself by using the Death Note and that his actions "may have been the result of the purity within him" prior to obtaining the Death Note.

This purity is demonstrated in Light's personality shift after he temporarily relinquishes the Death Note to ward off suspicion. Losing his memories as Kira along with ownership of the notebook, Light demonstrates compassion, a reluctance to manipulate others, and an intense unwillingness to kill. Once his memories return, however, he reverts to his ruthless Kira persona and remains that way until his death. Nevertheless, Ohba states that Light never lost his love for his family since he viewed them as righteous people.

Douglas Wolk of Salon describes Light as "coldly manipulative", "egomaniacal", and "an unrepentant serial killer, a butcher on an enormous scale" who is not "a Freddy Krueger, a monster who represents pure evil, or a Patrick Bateman, a demonic symbol of his age". Wolk describes Light as "the good guy, more or less" who genuinely believes that he holds "the moral high ground". When asked about which character was most similar to himself, Ohba indicated Near and "maybe Light." Regarding Light, Ohba cited "because I did well in school."

Travis Fickett of IGN describes Light as a "sociopath". Tom S. Pepirium of IGN describes Light as "brilliant, but disturbed". Wolk describes Light's ideal world, a "totalitarian" place "ruled by a propagandistic TV channel and an arbitrary secret executioner". Wolk said that Ohba sometimes suggests that this world is "in some ways a better, happier world than ours". Jolyon Baraka Thomas describes Light's vision of justice as "impure": "[His] supercilious attempt to save society from itself is both self-aggrandizing and cruel". Toshiki Inoue describes Light as a "child whose wish happens to come true".

=== Critical reception ===
Light Yagami is widely considered to be a villain protagonist and, by many, one of the most evil main characters in anime history due to his god complex, intense narcissism, gleeful and often mocking attitude toward his murders, willingness to kill innocent people or even his family to protect his identity, as well as his manipulation of others into committing suicide and orchestration of murders through the Death Note. Among his more notorious and ruthless acts, he forced Naomi Misora into suicide, considered murdering his younger sister Sayu after she was kidnapped by Mello to obtain the Death Note, deliberately burned his girlfriend Kiyomi Takada alive, caused Aiber to die of cancer with his family at his bedside, and manipulated Rem into killing both L and his adoptive father, Watari. Consequently, some viewers consider Light to have lost all moral qualities by the end of the story, including his previously good intentions and care for his relatives. Tom S. Pepirium of IGN said that he felt surprised when he learned that some viewers, while watching the series, wanted Light to emerge as the victor of the storyline; Pepirium added that his wife said that she was "kinda rooting for Light". Pepirium compared wanting Light to win to "cheering for Kevin Spacey at the end of Seven". Pepirium added that Brad Swaile, Light's English-language voice actor, "nails" the "difficult" task of making Light "both likable and hated". Jason Charpentier of The Anchor stated that Light's attributes and his role as a main character form "part of what makes Death Note interesting". Light was also listed 18th in IGN's 2009 best anime character of all-time list with writer Chris Mackenzie praising how Light is "mesmerizing". In 2014, he was placed seventh on IGN's list of greatest anime characters of all-time, with the cite stating that "Light Yagami was the force that drove Death Note and made it a phenomenon". Manga artist Katsura Hoshino, a former assistant of Takeshi Obata, has said that she likes the way that Light is often drawn as he gives the appeal of a cool villain.

Tetsuro Araki, the director of the anime, said that he felt an urge to support and cheer for Light. Araki added that Light would have used and killed him if he was one of Light's friends, but the director still believed that Light is "that interesting" and therefore he would have felt an attraction towards Light. Pauline Wong of OtakuZone had her opinions of the film portrayal of Light Yagami published in The Star, a Malaysian newspaper. In it, Wong says that the "very bishie-status-worthy" Fujiwara portrayed Light with "aplomb and near-perfection, right down to the evil little smile". Kitty Sensei, quoted in the same Malaysian article, says that the portrayal of Light in the film is "very faithful to the manga's". Tatsuya Fujiwara, the actor who portrayed Light in the films, said that he "could understand" Light's intentions to create a new world even though "murder is a horrible thing". Matsuyama describes L and Light as having "such unique characters that they're impossible to understand". Erika Toda, the actress who portrayed Misa Amane in the films, described Light's and Misa's actions as "criminal".

== See also ==
- List of Death Note characters
