= Cyrano de Bergerac (musical) =

- Music: Frank Wildhorn
- Lyrics: Leslie Bricusse
- Book: Leslie Bricusse
- Basis: Cyrano de Bergerac by Edmond Rostand
- Productions: 2009 Tokyo; 2013 Tokyo; 2017 Seoul; 2019 Seoul; 2024 Seoul

Cyrano de Bergerac is a musical with a book and lyrics by Leslie Bricusse and music by Frank Wildhorn. It is based on the 1897 play of the same title by Edmond Rostand.

== Production history ==
Wildhorn has said he composed the musical's title role specifically for Tony Award-nominated actor Douglas Sills, who previously appeared in Wildhorn's The Scarlet Pimpernel. Plans were made for the musical to debut in the United Kingdom in early 2006 and to open in the West End in the spring, but the project was cancelled.

Spanish singing star Raphael, who appeared in the Spanish production of Wildhorn's Jekyll & Hyde, was set to star in a Spring 2009 world premiere of Cyrano in Madrid, but the project was postponed until Fall 2009. A concept album in Spanish, with Raphael in the title role, is in the planning stages.

The world premiere of Cyrano de Bergerac took place on May 5, 2009 at the Nissay Theatre in Tokyo, in Japanese, closing on May 28, 2009. It stars Takeshi Kaga, who originated the roles of Jekyll and Hyde in the original Japanese production. The production then transferred to Osaka, running from June 3–7.

== Concept album ==
There were strong considerations to release the concept album for the musical in 2006, which was to star Sills in the title role and Linda Eder as Roxanne, with Rob Evan as Christian. Global Vision Records, which is managed and operated by Jekyll creative team member Jeremy Roberts, released Jekyll & Hyde: Resurrection Cast Recording, but cancelled plans to release the concept albums for both Cyrano and Dracula, the Musical. No plans have been announced for a potential release.

== Songs ==
- Let The Play Begin
- My Nose
- My Better Qualities
- Roxanne
- Bring Me Giants
- Pastry & Poetry
- Summer In Bergerac
- Someone
- Gascons
- Alone
- The Perfect Lover
- Love Is Here At Last
- My Words Upon His Lips
- I Fell From The Moon
- Take Care Of Him
- De Guiche's Scarf
- Every Single Day
- I Can Never Tell Her
- So Young, So Beautiful
- Days Of Autumn
- Cyrano's Gazette
- Alone (Reprise)
