= Death Note (disambiguation) =

Death Note is a manga by Tsugumi Ohba and Takeshi Obata that spawned a media franchise.

Death Note may also refer to:

- Death Note (2006 TV series), 2006 anime adaptation of the manga
- Death Note (2006 film), a 2006 live-action film of the manga
  - Death Note 2: The Last Name, sequel to 2006 film
  - L: Change the World
  - Death Note: New Generation, a 2016 live-action web series adaptation of the manga
  - Death Note: Light Up the New World, a 2016 live-action sequel film of the manga
- Death Note Kira's Game, a 2007 strategy video game of the manga
  - Death Note: Successors to L, a 2007 Death Note: Kira Game sequel strategy video game of the manga
- Death Note (2015 TV series), a 2015 live-action tv series adaptation of the manga
- Death Note (2017 film), a 2017 US live-action film adaptation of the manga
- Death Note: The Musical, a 2015 musical adaptation of the manga
- A 2006 light novel adaptation of the manga
- Death Note original soundtracks, multiple soundtrack albums
- Death Note, Edge of Paradise's first song of 2025

== Other ==
- Death note, a message written prior to a suicide attempt, also known as a suicide note
- Death Notes, the American title of Put on By Cunning
- Death Note, the Japanese title of Let Us Prey
- The Death Note, a 2016 Chinese horror film

== See also ==
- Death Notice (disambiguation)
  - Death notice, also known as an obituary, an article about a recently deceased person
- List of Death Note chapters
- List of Death Note characters
- The Death Notebooks, Anne Sexton's poetry collection from 1974
- Death notification, the delivery of the news of a death to another person
