= Mio Yūki =

Japanese actress, model, and television personality (born 1999)

- 優希 美青
- Born: Rina Kanno; April 5, 1999 (age 27); Minamisōma, Fukushima, Japan
- Occupations: Actress; model; tarento
- Years active: 2012– present
- Agent: Horipro
- Height: 159 cm (5 ft 3 in)

Rina Kanno (菅野 莉奈, Kanno Rina; born April 5, 1999), known professionally as Mio Yūki (優希 美青, Yūki Mio), is a Japanese actress, model and tarento.

== Career ==
Yūki's acting career began in 2012 when she won the 37th Horipro talent scout caravan. She was chosen from 29,521 applicants. On November 14, 2012, she debuted with her first song "Kagami no Naka no Watashi: I am a Princess". In April 2013, she made her acting debut in the NTV's drama Kumo no Kaidan. In September of the same year, she played the lead role for the first time in the film Sora Tobu Kingyo to Sekai no Himitsu. Yūki appeared as Kaoruko Onodera with Rena Nōnen in the NHK Asadora Amachan in June 2013. On February 24, 2015, it was announced that she would take a rest for a while because of illness. After 5 months off, she made a comeback, appearing in the live-action version of Death Note premiered on NTV on July 5, 2015. in 2023, she was cast in Japanese version of Doctor Foster

== Filmography ==
=== TV dramas ===
Year	Title	Role	Notes	Ref(s)
2013	Kumo no Kaidan	Sakiko Tasaka		
2013	Amachan	Kaoruko Onodera		
2013	Hakuba no Ōji-sama	Kotomi Ichikawa		
2014	Ashita, Mama ga Inai	Azusa Yoshida	Episode 3	
2015	Massan	Ema Kameyama		
2015	Death Note	Near/Mello		
2017	Erased	Airi Katagiri		
2024	Ayaka Is in Love with Hiroko!	Risa Komai		
2025	Chihayafuru: Full Circle	Sumire Hanano		

=== Films ===
Year	Title	Role	Notes	Ref(s)
2013	Sora Tobu Kingyo to Sekai no Himitsu	Midori Kuroda		
2014	Otome no Recipe	Akane Amano		
2014	Torihada: Gekijōban 2			
2014	As the Gods Will	Shōko Takase		
2015	Fantastic Girls	Ayuko Sasaoka		
2015	Assassination Classroom	Yukiko Kanzaki		
2015	Yakuza Apocalypse			
2016	Assassination Classroom: Graduation	Yukiko Kanzaki		
2021	No Call No Life			
2025	Welcome Back			
2027	Akiramemasen!			

=== Radio ===
- Mio Yūki's First Diary (Tokyo FM, 2013-)

=== Commercials ===
- Kyocera - Kyocera Thinking Energy (2012-)
- Ezaki Glico - Giant Cone (2013-)

== Bibliography ==
=== Magazines ===
- Pichi Lemon, Gakken Publishing 1986-, as an exclusive model

=== Photobooks ===
- Before (Horipro, 26 November 2012) ISBN 9784904587003
- After (Horipro, 23 March 2013) ISBN 9784904587010
