= Ee Sabdam Innathe Sabdam =

- Promotional poster
- Directed by: P. G. Viswambaran
- Written by: Sharada; John Paul
- Produced by: K. P. Kottarakara
- Starring: Mammootty; Shobana; Rohini
- Cinematography: B. Vasanthkumar
- Edited by: G. Venkitaraman
- Music by: Shyam
- Production company: Ganesh Pictures
- Distributed by: Ganesh Pictures
- Release date: 11 April 1985
- Running time: 127 min
- Country: India
- Language: Malayalam

Ee Sabdam Innathe Sabdam is a 1985 Indian Malayalam-language action thriller rape and revenge film, directed by P. G. Viswambaran, written jointly by Sharada and John Paul and produced by K. P. Kottarakara. The film stars Mammootty in the lead role, while Shobana, Rohini, Captain Raju and Vijayraghavan play supporting roles. It is loosely based on the Hollywood movie Death Wish. The film was a blockbuster and was one of the biggest hits of the year.

== Plot ==
A group of boys stalks and harasses their neighbor, Dr. Ramachandran and his wife, Sharada, who complain to the police against them a few times. Sharada is raped and murdered by them after keeping Dr. Ramachandran as hostage. They also rape his sister and she loses her mental balance. Ramachandran seeks vengeance and becomes a vigilante against his wife's killers.

== Cast ==
- Mammootty as Dr. Ramachandran
- Shobana as Dr. Sharada
- Rohini as Pushpa
- Captain Raju as SP Gopinathan IPS
- Vijayaraghavan as Balu
- Shivaji as Chandru
- Kalabhavan Ansar
- Sreelatha Namboothiri
- Azeez as SI Raveendran
- Jose Prakash as MP Nandan Menon
- C. I. Paul as Advocate Stephen Antony
- Jagannatha Varma as Police Officer Aadithyan Kurup
- Jagathi Sreekumar as Nanukuttan Pillai
- K. P. Kumar as Arun Kumar

== Soundtrack ==
The music was composed by Shyam and the lyrics were written by Poovachal Khader.

No.	Song	Singers	Lyrics	Length (m:ss)
1	"Aaromal Nee"	K. J. Yesudas	Poovachal Khader	
2	"Aaromal Nee" (Bit)	K. J. Yesudas	Poovachal Khader	
