= List of Death Note chapters =

Cover of the first tankōbon for Death Note, released in Japan by Shueisha on April 2, 2004.

This is a list of the chapters of the Japanese manga series Death Note, written by Tsugumi Ohba and illustrated by Takeshi Obata. The 108 individual chapters were originally serialized in Shueisha's Weekly Shōnen Jump, from December 2003 to May 2006. The series primarily focuses on high school student Light Yagami who decides to use a supernatural notebook called the "Death Note", which kills anyone whose name is written in it, to rid the world of evil.

Death Note has been compiled into twelve tankōbon in Japan, with the first being released on April 2, 2004, and the twelfth on July 4, 2006. In addition to these, a guidebook for the manga, Death Note 13: How to Read, was also published on October 13, 2006. The guidebook has information about the series, with character profiles, creator interviews, and the pilot chapter that preceded Death Note. A one-shot story special of Death Note was also released in February 2008, and is set two years after the original story's epilogue; a second one-shot was announced to be in development in April 2019. Death Note has been adapted into an anime with thirty-seven episodes produced by Nippon Television, and has five live-action films.

The Death Note manga is licensed by Viz Media for North American distribution under their "Shonen Jump Advanced" imprint. Viz published the first volume on October 10, 2005, and the last on July 3, 2007. A hardcover version of volume 1 was also released by Viz on September 16, 2008. Viz published Death Note 13: How to Read on February 19, 2008, and collected the Death Note volumes along with Death Note 13: How to Read into a box set on October 7, 2008. On October 4, 2016, all 12 original manga volumes and the February 2008 one-shot were released in a single All-in-One Edition, consisting of 2,400 pages in a single book. The All-in-One Edition was released in English on September 6, 2017, resulting in the February 2008 one-shot being released in English for the first time. A standalone Death Note: Special One Shot written by Ohba and drawn by Obata, was published in February 2020.

== Volumes ==
No.	Title	Original release date	English release date
1	Boredom; Taikutsu (退屈)	April 2, 2004; 4-08-873621-4	October 10, 2005; 978-1-4215-0168-0
1. "Boredom" (退屈, "Taikutsu"); 2. "L" (L, "Eru"); 3. "Family" (家族, "Kazoku"); 4. "Current" (電流, "Denryū"); 5. "Eyeballs" (眼球, "Gankyū"); 6. "Manipulation" (操作, "Sōsa"); 7. "Target" (標的, "Hyōteki")
When high school student Light Yagami finds a notebook called the "Death Note", which gives him the ability to kill anyone he recognizes by sight by simply writing their name in it, he begins mass murdering criminals to create a world free of evil and to eventually become its god. Light meets the owner of the Death Note, a Shinigami named Ryuk, who allows Light to use the notebook under his watch. When law enforcement and the public realize someone is committing the killings, they nickname the unknown killer "Kira". The Japanese National Police Agency or "NPA", with the aid of a mysterious detective known only as "L", search and set traps for Kira. When L deduces Kira can kill those whose faces and names he knows, some of the investigators drop out in fear of their lives. L asks for the FBI's help to investigate the NPA members, suspecting that one of them may be related to Kira. An FBI agent watches Soichiro Yagami, Light's father and one of the investigators, along with his family. Light catches on and uses his Death Note to learn the name of the agent.
2	Confluence; Gōryū (合流)	July 2, 2004; 4-08-873631-1	November 8, 2005; 978-1-4215-0169-7
8. "Woman" (女, "Onna"); 9. "Slots" (穴, "Ana"); 10. "Confluence" (合流, "Gōryū"); 11. "One" (一, "Hitotsu"); 12. "God" (神, "Kami"); 13. "Countdown" (秒読, "Byōyomi"); 14. "Temptation" (誘惑, "Yūwaku"); 15. "Phone Call" (電話, "Denwa"); 16. "Handstand" (逆立, "Sakadachi")
Having seen FBI agent Raye Penber's face and learned his name, Light forces Penber to kill the other agents with the Death Note before Light kills him as well. After the deaths become known, only Soichiro Yagami and four other policemen continue working with L on the Kira investigation. L meets them to collaborate directly instead of remaining hidden behind a computer. When the task force meets in a hotel, Light goes to their police station and meets Raye Penber's fiancée, Naomi Misora, by chance. She is there to share what she learned about Kira's power through Raye's death, namely that Kira can decide the cause of death and control his victims' actions prior to death. Light introduces himself to her as a task force member and tricks her into revealing her name. With a piece of paper torn from the Death Note, he forces her to commit suicide in a hidden place. L reviews the FBI agents' actions before their deaths and notices Penber's odd behavior. When L is informed of Naomi's disappearance, he suspects the two families Raye investigated and installs surveillance equipment in their homes. Light persuades Ryuk to find the equipment for him.
3	Hard Run; Gekisō (激走)	September 3, 2004; 4-08-873652-4	January 3, 2006; 978-1-4215-0170-3
17. "Trash" (芥, "Gomi"); 18. "Gaze" (視線, "Shisen"); 19. "Humiliation" (屈辱, "Kutsujoku"); 20. "First Move" (先手, "Sente"); 21. "Duplicity" (裏腹, "Urahara"); 22. "Misfortune" (不幸, "Fukō"); 23. "Hard Run" (激走, "Gekisō"); 24. "Shield" (盾, "Tate"); 25. "Fool" (馬鹿, "Baka")
To keep working as Kira, Light hides a mini television in a bag of chips to watch for criminals in the news and write down their names while studying under surveillance. L removes the cameras but remains suspicious of Light. At Toho University, L reveals his identity and suspicion to Light to see the latter's reaction. Light acts as L's ally, ostensibly to prove his own innocence. On a Sakura TV broadcast, an unknown individual with powers like Kira's warns others not to disrupt Kira's work, before killing anti-Kira commentators. Soichiro enters the Sakura TV building in an armored car without showing his face and stops the broadcast. Light realizes he has a mystery ally who has shortened their lifespan to obtain shinigami eyes, which allows the holder to see anyone's real name and lifespan. L asks Light to join them to stop the second Kira.
4	Love; Koigokoro (恋心)	November 4, 2004; 4-08-873671-0	March 7, 2006; 978-1-4215-0331-8
26. "Reversal" (転倒, "Tentō"); 27. "Love" (恋心, "Koigokoro"); 28. "Judgement" (判定, "Hantei"); 29. "Weapon" (武器, "Buki"); 30. "Bomb" (爆弾, "Bakudan"); 31. "Easy" (簡単, "Kantan"); 32. "Gamble" (賭, "Kake"); 33. "Removal" (移動, "Idō"); 34. "Imprisonment" (投身, "Tōshin")
Light joins L's investigation team, hoping to find the second Kira before them. L asks Light to write a message as if he were Kira, so the second Kira would respond. The second Kira is a popular idol named Misa Amane, who sends instructions for meeting. Light and Officer Touta Matsuda head to the meeting place, where Misa discovers Light is Kira through her shinigami eyes: the eyes are unable to see the lifespan of other Death Notes holders. Misa visits Light at home and tells him she is the second Kira, offering to aid him in his work. Light decides he could make use of her love for him. Later, Misa sees Light talking to L at the university and sees L's real name. Before she could tell Light, she is arrested under suspicion of being the second Kira. Her Shinigami, Rem, convinces her to forfeit her Death Note, and Misa loses her memories concerning the Death Note. In turn, Rem orders Light to save Misa. Light gives Rem his Death Note. L asks for Light to be imprisoned, suggesting the latter may be under Kira's control.
5	Whiteout; Hakushi (白紙)	February 4, 2005; 4-08-873774-1	May 2, 2006; 978-1-4215-0626-5
35. "Whiteout" (白紙, "Hakushi"); 36. "Father and Son" (親子, "Oyako"); 37. "Eight" (八人, "Hachinin"); 38. "Strike" (打撃, "Dageki"); 39. "Separation" (離別, "Ribetsu"); 40. "Allies" (仲間, "Nakama"); 41. "Matsuda" (松田); 42. "Heaven" (天国, "Tengoku"); 43. "Black" (黒, "Kuro")
After a week in prison, Light forfeits his Death Note in order to lose the associated memories. As Kira is apparently still killing people, L sets Light and Misa free, though keeps Light in handcuffs. Light discovers the new Kira is someone from Yotsuba Corporations who has possession of a Death Note and is with Rem. Matsuda spies on them but is discovered after hearing one of the members present is Kira. Matsuda tells them he is Misa's manager and wants Yotsuba to feature Misa in their advertisements. They believe him. At the party to celebrate the signing, Matsuda fakes his death by jumping from the Yotsuba building with the other officers' help. On L's side, a burglar known as Wedy installs cameras in the building while Aiber, a con man, presents himself to the Yotsuba members as an ally to learn more about them.
6	Give-and-Take; Kōkan (交換)	April 4, 2005; 4-08-873795-4	July 5, 2006; 978-1-4215-0627-2
44. "Successor" (後継, "Atotsugi"); 45. "Crazy" (無茶, "Mucha"); 46. "Ill-Suited" (不向, "Fumuki"); 47. "Impertinence" (先走, "Sakibashiri"); 48. "Give-and-Take" (交換, "Kōkan"); 49. "Potted Plant" (植木, "Ueki"); 50. "Yotsuba" (四葉); 51. "Misunderstanding" (誤認, "Gonin"); 52. "Split-Second" (寸止, "Sundome")
With evidence gathered by Aiber and Wedy, the Kira investigation team learn that one of the seven Yotsuba members is the new Kira. L asks the team not to arrest them until their powers are known. He sends Misa to investigate. Rem tells Misa about her and Light's previous identities as Kira and helps her produce a confession from Yotsuba's Kyosuke Higuchi. Allied with the other Yotsuba members, Light devises a plan to make Higuchi watch a TV program, during which Matsuda is supposed to reveal Kira's identity. When Higuchi tries to kill Matsuda, the investigation team ambushes and arrests him.
7	Zero; Zero (零)	July 4, 2005; 4-08-873830-6	September 5, 2006; 978-1-4215-0628-9
53. "Scream" (悲鳴, "Himei"); 54. "Inside" (中, "Naka"); 55. "Creation" (創造, "Sōzō"); 56. "Embrace" (抱擁, "Hōyō"); 57. "Two Choices" (二択, "Nitaku"); 58. "Feelings Within" (胸中, "Kyōchū"); 59. "Zero" (零, "Zero"); 60. "Kidnapping" (誘拐, "Yūkai"); 61. "Number Two" (二番, "Niban")
Upon his arrest, Kyosuke Higuchi tells the investigation team about the Death Note. When they touch the Death Note, they are able to see Rem at the scene. Light regains his Death Note-related memories by touching the notebook and kills Higuchi. L and the Kira investigation team study the Death Note and question Rem. Misled by the false usage rules written in the cover, they remove Light's handcuffs and set Misa free. Misa tries to recall L's real name while continuing Kira's work at Light's instruction. To protect Misa, Rem kills L's mystery ally and L. Rem dies, and Light takes control of the investigation team as the next L. The FBI and CIA form a new team, the SPK, to counter Kira, who begins to gain moral support from parts of the world.
8	Target; Mato (的)	September 2, 2005; 4-08-873852-7	November 7, 2006; 978-1-4215-0629-6
62. "Decision" (決断, "Ketsudan"); 63. "Target" (的, "Mato"); 64. "Right Angle" (直角, "Chokkaku"); 65. "Responsibility" (責任, "Sekinin"); 66. "Death" (死亡, "Shibō"); 67. "Button" (釦, "Botan"); 68. "Discovery" (発見, "Hakken"); 69. "Flight" (飛翔, "Hishō"); 70. "Tremble" (身震, "Miburui")
L's spiritual heirs Mello and Near, also known as M and N, compete with each other and against Light. Mello abducts Light's sister, Sayu, and asks for the Death Note recovered by the Japanese investigation team in exchange. Caught between Mello and Light, Soichiro Yagami tries to rescue his daughter without involving the police. Matsuda claims to be the new L, to shield Light's identity. Mello acquires a Death Note and meets its Shinigami owner, Shido (Sidoh). Fearing Mello's powers, the President of the United States seeks help from Light.
9	Contact; Sesshoku (接触)	December 2, 2005; 4-08-873887-X	January 2, 2007; 978-1-4215-0630-2
71. "Contact" (接触, "Sesshoku"); 72. "Verification" (確認, "Kakunin"); 73. "Cornered" (背水, "Haisui"); 74. "A Fine Performance" (熱演, "Netsuen"); 75. "Acknowledgement" (認知, "Ninchi"); 76. "Greetings" (挨拶, "Aisatsu"); 77. "Use" (利用, "Riyō"); 78. "Prediction" (予測, "Yosoku"); 79. "Lies" (白々, "Shirajira")
After a conflict with Mello and his men, Soichiro Yagami recovers a Death Note but dies of his injuries. Light returns the Death Note to Shido and sends him away. The U.S. Government acknowledges Kira and disbands the SPK. Near works with Light over Kira- and Mello-related matters while suspecting Light is Kira. Near determines the 13-day rule written in the Death Note is fake.
10	Deletion; Sakujo (削除)	February 3, 2006; 4-08-874018-1	March 6, 2007; 978-1-4215-1155-9
80. "Clean-Up" (掃除, "Sōji"); 81. "Warning" (通告, "Tsūkoku"); 82. "Himself" (自分, "Jibun"); 83. "Delete" (削除, "Sakujo"); 84. "Coincidence" (偶然, "Gūzen"); 85. "Election" (当選, "Tōsen"); 86. "Japan" (日本, "Nihon"); 87. "Tomorrow" (明日, "Ashita"); 88. "Conversation" (会話, "Kaiwa")
Teru Mikami, a worshipper of Kira, acquires a Death Note. Light's former girlfriend Kiyomi Takada, a TV anchor, becomes Kira's spokesperson and reconnects with Light. Light reveals his identity to her and Mikami to enlist their cooperation. Mikami acts as the Hand of Kira to deflect suspicion off Light.
11	Kindred Spirits; Dōshin (同心)	May 2, 2006; 4-08-874041-6	May 1, 2007; 978-1-4215-1178-8
89. "Kindred Spirits" (同心, "Dōshin"); 90. "Preview" (予告, "Yokoku"); 91. "Standstill" (停止, "Teishi"); 92. "Night" (夜, "Yoru"); 93. "Decision" (決定, "Kettei"); 94. "Outside" (外, "Soto"); 95. "Convinced" (納得, "Nattoku"); 96. "Meanwhile" (一方, "Ippō"); 97. "Miscellaneous" (色々, "Iroiro"); 98. "Everybody" (全員, "Zen'in")
Near's group determine Mikami is X-Kira after seeing him use a Death Note and talking about Shinigami. Near arrives in Japan to capture Kira, convinced Kira is Light. Misa and Kiyomi face off for Light's affections. Light and Near arrange to meet in person.
12	Finis; Kan (完)	July 4, 2006; 4-08-874131-5	July 3, 2007; 978-1-4215-1327-0
99. "Two" (二人, "Futari"); 100. "Face to Face" (対面, "Taimen"); 101. "Inducement" (誘導, "Yūdō"); 102. "Patience" (我慢, "Gaman"); 103. "Declaration" (宣言, "Sengen"); 104. "Answer" (答, "Kotae"); 105. "Impossible" (無理, "Muri"); 106. "Intent to Kill" (殺意, "Satsui"); 107. "Curtain" (幕, "Maku"); 108. "Finis" (完, "Kan")
Light and Near's teams meet in a warehouse and are seen with Mikami's shinigami eyes. Mikami writes down the investigators' names in a Death Note, and Light reveals he is Kira. Near reveals he worked with Mello to trick Mikami into writing in a forged Death Note. Light tries to write names in his own blood on a hidden scrap of his Death Note, but Matsuda, furious at Light's betrayal, shoots him repeatedly. A severely injured Light asks Ryuk to write Near's name in the Death Note. Ryuk writes Light's name instead, killing him.
