= Christopher Britton (actor) =

Canadian film, stage, television and voice actor

- Born: Toronto, Ontario, Canada
- Other name: Chris Britton
- Occupation: Actor
- Years active: 1975–present
- Agent: RED MGMT
- Known for: Mister Sinister in X-Men: The Animated Series and X-Men '97
- Spouses: Claudette Jaiko (m. 1980; div. 1986) Gwynyth Walsh (m. 2006)

Christopher Britton is a Canadian film, stage, television and voice actor known for his work in X-Men: The Animated Series and X-Men '97, in which he was the voice of Mister Sinister. Additionally, Britton voiced the character of Soichiro Yagami in the English dub of the anime series Death Note and its live action counterpart. He also was the narrator on the Dino Crisis II video game created by Capcom in 2000. He has a regular role as Richard Norton in Da Vinci's Inquest/City Hall, and has acted in several films, including The Day After Tomorrow and Godsend. He has worked on many plays and theater productions, including two seasons with the Stratford and Shaw Festivals, and has acted throughout Ontario, Vancouver, and the United States.

== Early life and education ==
Christopher Britton was born and raised in Toronto, Ontario, Canada, and first studied acting as a teenager. For a brief period, he was a member of the Judy Jarvis Dance Company, one of the first modern dance companies in Toronto. He graduated from York University with a BFA in theatre. While an undergraduate, Britton was an associate fellow of Stong College teaching a course in the life and work of Edward Gordon Craig. Upon graduating, he spent two seasons at the Stratford and Shaw Festivals and worked at regional theaters across Canada.

== Career ==
In 1980, Britton started the first Artists Action Network within Amnesty International that worked for the release of imprisoned artists. During the early eighties he studied acting with Uta Hagen in New York City and acted in The Misanthrope directed by Mark Lamos at The Hartford Stage and The Taming of the Shrew at the Astor Place Theater in New York. He returned to Canada to be a member of the Grand Theater Company with Robin Phillips. In the late 80's he landed the role of 'Einstein' in the one actor play and toured Canada, Boston, and Louisville in over 200 performances.

In film and television his roles include Rombout Kemp in Peter Greenaway's Nightwatching, the KKK leader opposite Forest Whitaker in Deacons For Defense, the mad film critic in John Carpenter's Cigarette Burns and in The Final Cut opposite Robin Williams. He has had recurring roles in DaVinci's Inquest, DaVinci's City Hall, Intelligence and Painkiller Jane.

His first screenplay, Capital Murder, based on the true story of the lawyer who defended the last two men to be executed in Canada, was awarded a Fellowship in the Praxis Screenwriting Competition. A second screenplay, The Good Men, an action thriller, was also awarded a Fellowship at Praxis.

== Personal life ==
Britton lives and works in Vancouver and Los Angeles with his wife, actress Gwynyth Walsh and frequently returns to Toronto to work and spend time with his daughter.

== Filmography ==
=== Film ===
Year	Title	Role	Notes
1979	The Brood	Man in Auditorium	
1981	Scanners	Hazmat Worker	Uncredited
1981	Ticket to Heaven	Simon	
1986	Maximum Overdrive	Drive-thru Teller Voice (voice)	Uncredited
1989	Millennium	Council Chamber Member, Buffalo	
1989	Whispers	Bookseller	
1997	Good Will Hunting	Executive #2	
2001	Judgment	Guard	
2003	Deacons for Defense	William Chase	
2004	The Final Cut	Jason Monroe	
2004	Godsend	Dr. Lieber	
2004	Flush	Richard	
2004	The Day After Tomorrow	Vorsteen	
2006	Death Note	Soichiro Yagami (voice)	English dub
2006	Silent Hill	Adam	
2007	Nightwatching	Rombout Kemp	
2009	No One Knows You Like Your Mother	Victor Alberton	
2011	Thor: Tales of Asgard	Odin (voice)	Direct-to-video
2013	Carrie	Dean McDuffy	
2017	Death Note	Aaron Peltz	

=== Television ===
Year	Title	Role	Notes
1981	The Great Detective	Miles Porter	Episode: "Skull-Duggery"
1993–1997	X-Men: The Animated Series	Mister Sinister (voice)	11 episodes
1994	Kung Fu: The Legend Continues	Father Williams	Episode: "The Possessed"
1995	TekWar	Janus	Episode: "Tek Posse"
1998	Silver Surfer	Prime Minister Zarek (voice)	Episode: "The Forever War"
2002	Mutant X	J.K. Bergman	Episode: "Sign from Above"
2004–2005	Da Vinci's Inquest	Richard Norton	8 Episodes
2005	Stargate Atlantis	Prenum	Episode: "The Siege"
2006	Blade	Barron	Episode: "Conclave"
2007	Intelligence	Nathan Clear	3 episodes
2007–2008	Death Note	Soichiro Yagami (voice)	English dub; 27 episodes
2011	Mayday	Chesley Sullenberger	Episode: "Hudson Splash Down"
2011–2012	Iron Man: Armored Adventures	Doctor Doom (voice)	2 episodes
2012	The Little Prince	Ashkabaar, Rakash (voice)	Episode: "The Planet of Ashkabaar"
2017–2018	Riverdale	Judge	2 episodes
2018	The Magicians	Demon Todd	Episode: "All That Josh"
2017–2019	My Little Pony: Friendship Is Magic	Star Swirl the Bearded (voice)	4 episodes
2024	X-Men '97	Mister Sinister (voice)	6 episodes

=== Video games ===
Year	Title	Role	Notes
1995	Marvel Super Heroes	Iron Man	
2000	Marvel vs. Capcom 2: New Age of Heroes	Iron Man	Uncredited
2000	Dino Crisis II	Narrator	
2000	Project I.G.I.	Additional voices	
2005	Evil Dead: Regeneration	Additional voices	
2005	The Matrix: Path of Neo	Swordsman	Uncredited
