= Miyuki Komatsu =

Japanese actress (born 1971)

- 小松 みゆき
- Born: Miyuki Komatsu (小松美幸); June 5, 1971 (age 55); Iwaki, Fukushima, Japan
- Education: Jissen Women's University
- Occupation: Actress
- Years active: 1990–present
- Height: 155 cm (5 ft 1 in)
- Spouse: Unknown (m. 2009)
- Children: 1

Miyuki Komatsu (小松 みゆき, Komatsu Miyuki; originally 小松美幸, born June 5, 1971) is a Japanese actress. She made her debut as a gravure idol in 1990, and also appeared in two adult videos in 1993. She is well known for her roles as Sanami in Death Note and Death Note 2: The Last Name. She reprised her role for TV special The Man who was Made a Fool by L the Most - Detective Matsuda's Case File.

== Biography ==
Miyuki Komatsu was born on June 5, 1971, in Iwaki, Fukushima. She was born to parents who owned a bowling alley at home. She is the eldest of two sisters. She has been active since childhood and takes the initiative in everything, studying classical ballet from the age of 9 to 20. During her teenage years, she began to enjoy watching Nokin Trio movies that were popular in the early 1980s. When Komatsu entered Iwaki Girls' High School (now Iwaki Sakuragaoka High School), she began to become an actress, influenced by the fact that Kumiko Akiyoshi was a high school graduate and her movies.

Komatsu was scouted in Harajuku while studying at Jissen Women's University. She debuted in 1990 as (小松 美幸) in a swimsuit gravure in the October 23rd issue of Weekly Playboy. In the following year, when she became nude for the first time in the same magazine, her outstanding proportions of B82, W57, and H82 and beautiful breasts that draw beautiful forms became a hot topic, and she gained top-class popularity as a gravure model.

Focusing mainly in magazine gravure, photo collections, and image videos, and in 1992, along with Yoko Hoshino, was appointed as a calendar girl for Kyodo Oil. During this time, Komatsu appeared in the V-cinema Downtown Girls (1991), but in the fourth photo book The LAST SHOW published in July 1992, she became an actress. In August, he played the semi-leading role in the film adaptation of the Kido Prize-winning scenario, Kohei Fukumoto, Kakuhashiki, which is acclaimed as an honorable mention for youth films.

In February 1993, Komatsu played a wet scene in Nikkatsu's movie Sweet Room. In May of the same year, she continued to appear in sexy works, such as showing a bewitching performance in the Kunoichi Ninpocho.

In 1994, she changed her Japanese name as (小松 みゆき). For a while, she appeared in conventional sexy works such as TOKYO BALLADE Dangerous Temptation and Onna Kyoushi, and was active as a hair nude photo book model. After making the Final Nude Declaration in 1994, she played a wide range of roles, mainly in V-cinema and TV dramas.

Her acting ability was also recognized in general works, and from 2003 she made a regular appearance in the television drama Ooku on Fuji TV and became a hot topic.

== Personal life ==
On December 6, 2009, Komatsu married a director of an apparel company 8 years her junior.

On September 14, 2020, Komatsu announced her pregnancy, and she later gave birth to a daughter on February 18, 2021.

== Film ==
Year	Title	Role	Note
1992	Fukumoto Kôhei kaku hashiriki	Rie Natsume	Film debut
1993	Kunoichi ninpô-chô 3: Higi densetsu no kai		
1994	Onna kyoshi	Shoko Shimizu	
1996	Gamera 2: Attack of the Legion	Female TV reporter in Sapporo, Susukino	
1997	Peking Man	Hanako Yamato	
1999	Shin Bubble to Neta Onna Tachi	Asami Shimizu	
1999	Gamera 3: Revenge of Iris	Female Reporter in Shibuya	
1999	Sagishi ippei	Saki	
2000	Sagishi ippei 2	Saki	
2000	Sagishi ippei 3	Saki	
2001	Godzilla, Mothra and King Ghidorah: Giant Monsters All-Out Attack	Signaller	
2004	Fateful	Nojimi	
2005	Aegis		
2006	Death Note	Sanami	
2006	Death Note 2: The Last Name	Sanami	
2006	Oh! Oku	Matsugae	
2010	Itsumo yori suteki na yoru ni	Misa Takagi	Lead role
2013	Renketsu bubun wa densha ga yureru: Tsuma no kao ni modorenai	Ryoko Kawashima	Lead role
2021	Boku ga Kimi no Mimi ni Naru	Coach	
2021	Aru Kazoku	Club mama	
2022	Gekkako	Yuri	Also as intimacy scene coordinator
2024	Le Jardin e Yokoso	Akemi	

=== Television ===
Year	Title	Role	Note
1990	Tsukiumaya Oen jikenchô		
2008	The Man who was Made a Fool by L the Most - Detective Matsuda's Case File	Sanami	
2006	Hei no naka no korinai onnatachi: utsunomiya joshi keimusho		TV movie
2015	Matsumoto Seichô Mystery Jidaigeki		episode 1
