= Death Wish =

Death Wish or Deathwish may refer to:

== Common meanings ==
- Death drive, a psychoanalytic term
- Homicidal ideation, a term for thoughts about killing another human
- Suicidal ideation, a term for thoughts about killing oneself

== Arts and entertainment ==
=== Radio ===
- "Death Wish", a 1957 episode of the radio series X Minus One

=== Literature ===
==== Books ====
- The Death Wish, a 1934 novel by Elisabeth Sanxay Holding
- Death Wish (novel), a 1972 novel by Brian Garfield
- Death Wish: A Story of the Mafia, a 1977 novel by Iceberg Slim
- Death Wishes, a 1983 novel by Philip Loraine
- Death Wish, a 2010 non-fiction book by Christopher Sorrentino

==== Comics ====
- Death Wish, a strip in British comic Valiant from 1975
- Deathwish, a character appearing in issue 5 of the 1993 Hardware comic universe

==== Short stories ====
- "Death Wish", a 1956 short story by Robert Sheckley under the pseudonym Ned Lang

=== Film ===
- Death Wish (1974 film), a film based on the 1972 Brian Garfield novel
  - Death Wish (film series), a series of four films following the 1974 original
  - Death Wish (2018 film), a remake of the 1974 film

=== Television ===
- "Death Wish" (Star Trek: Voyager), a 1996 episode of Star Trek: Voyager
- "Death Wish" (The Sympathizer), a TV episode
- Death Wish Live, a 2006 reality show programming block on Channel 4

=== Music ===
- Death Wish (soundtrack), composed by Herbie Hancock for the 1974 film
- Deathwish (album), a 2018 album by Within Destruction
- "Deathwish", a song by British rock band The Police from the 1979 album Reggatta de Blanc
- Deathwish (EP), a 1984 EP by American gothic rock band Christian Death
- Deathwish Inc., an American music label formed in 2000
- "Death Wish", a song by American rapper Jadakiss from the 2009 album The Last Kiss
- "Death Wish", a song from the soundtrack of Danganronpa: Trigger Happy Havoc
- "Deathwish", a song by Red Sun Rising from the 2018 album THREAD
- "Deathwish", a song by Stand Atlantic from the 2022 album F.E.A.R.
- "Deathwish", a song by Three Days Grace from the 2025 album Alienation
- "Death Wish" (song), a song by Gracie Abrams from the 2026 album Daughter from Hell

== Other uses ==
- Death Wish Coffee, a brand based in Round Lake, New York
- Deathwish, a skateboard company, sister company of Baker Skateboards

== See also ==
- Death Note (disambiguation)
