= Death Notice =

Death Notice may refer to:

- Death notice, a type of obituary
- "Death Notice", an episode of the Starsky & Hutch television series
- Death Notice (Ritter novel), a 2010 novel by Todd Ritter
- Death Notice (Zhou novel), a 2014 novel by Zhou Haohui
  - Death Notice (film), a 2022 Hong Kong film based on the novel

== See also ==
- Death Note (disambiguation)
- Kill notice, a term used by news and photo agencies to declare manipulated or faked documents as "not to be used"
