= Death Note Another Note: The Los Angeles BB Murder Cases =

2006 light novel by Nisio Isin

- Author: Nisio Isin
- Translator: Andrew Cunningham (English)
- Language: Japanese
- Genre: Mystery, Detective
- Publisher: Shueisha, Viz Media (English)
- Publication date: August 1, 2006; February 19, 2008 (English)
- Publication place: Japan
- Media type: Print (hardback)
- Pages: 176

Death Note Another Note: The Los Angeles BB Murder Cases (Japanese: DEATH NOTE(デスノート) アナザーノート・ロサンゼルスBB連続殺人事件, Hepburn: Desu Nōto Anazā Nōto: Rosanzerusu BB Renzoku Satsujin Jiken) is a light novel written by Nisio Isin and released on August 1, 2006. The story is a prequel to the manga Death Note, and expands on the briefly-mentioned Los Angeles "BB Murder Cases".

== Plot ==
The story is narrated by Mello, a character from the manga. It recounts the time the detective L worked with FBI agent Naomi Misora to stop a violent serial killer in the United States. The murderer calls himself "Beyond Birthday", or BB. The Los Angeles BB Murder Case or Wara Ningyo/Straw Doll Murders was designed as a challenge from Beyond Birthday to L to solve the ultimate crime to be committed.

On hearing about the murders, L accepts said challenge and recruits Misora to investigate. She meets a detective who introduces himself as Rue Ryuzaki. The investigation reveals that each murder leads clues to the next, and Misora and Ryuzaki follow the trail of victims murdered in the style of a locked room mystery.

Wara Ningyos nailed to the walls of a locked room. Four rooms. Four murders to be committed. As Misora and Ryuzaki follow the trail the murderer left behind, will they be able to predict where the final murder will occur and stop it from happening?

== Reception ==
The novel was reviewed for IGN.
