= Lorelei: The Witch of the Pacific Ocean =

- Theatrical release poster
- Directed by: Shinji Higuchi
- Screenplay by: Satoshi Suzuki
- Based on: Lorelei at the End of War by Harutoshi Fukui
- Produced by: Minami Ichikawa
- Starring: Kōji Yakusho; Satoshi Tsumabuki
- Cinematography: Akira Sato
- Edited by: Hiroshi Okuda
- Music by: Naoki Satō
- Production company: Cine Bazar
- Distributed by: Toho
- Release date: 5 March 2005 (Japan)
- Running time: 128 minutes
- Country: Japan
- Languages: Japanese; English
- Budget: ¥1.2 billion
- Box office: ¥2.4 billion

Lorelei: The Witch of the Pacific Ocean, known in Japan as simply Lorelei (Japanese: ローレライ, Hepburn: Rōrerai), is a 2005 Japanese war drama film directed by Shinji Higuchi (in his feature directorial debut). In the film, the Imperial Japanese Navy save Tokyo from a third atomic bomb during World War II. The film was the highest-grossing film in Japan during the week of its release.

The story of "Lorelei", based on a best-selling novel written by Harutoshi Fukui, is a departure from the last 50 years of Japanese cinema by weaving a tale using a "what if" fictional narrative with a tip of the hat to modern manga storylines and styles.

== Plot ==
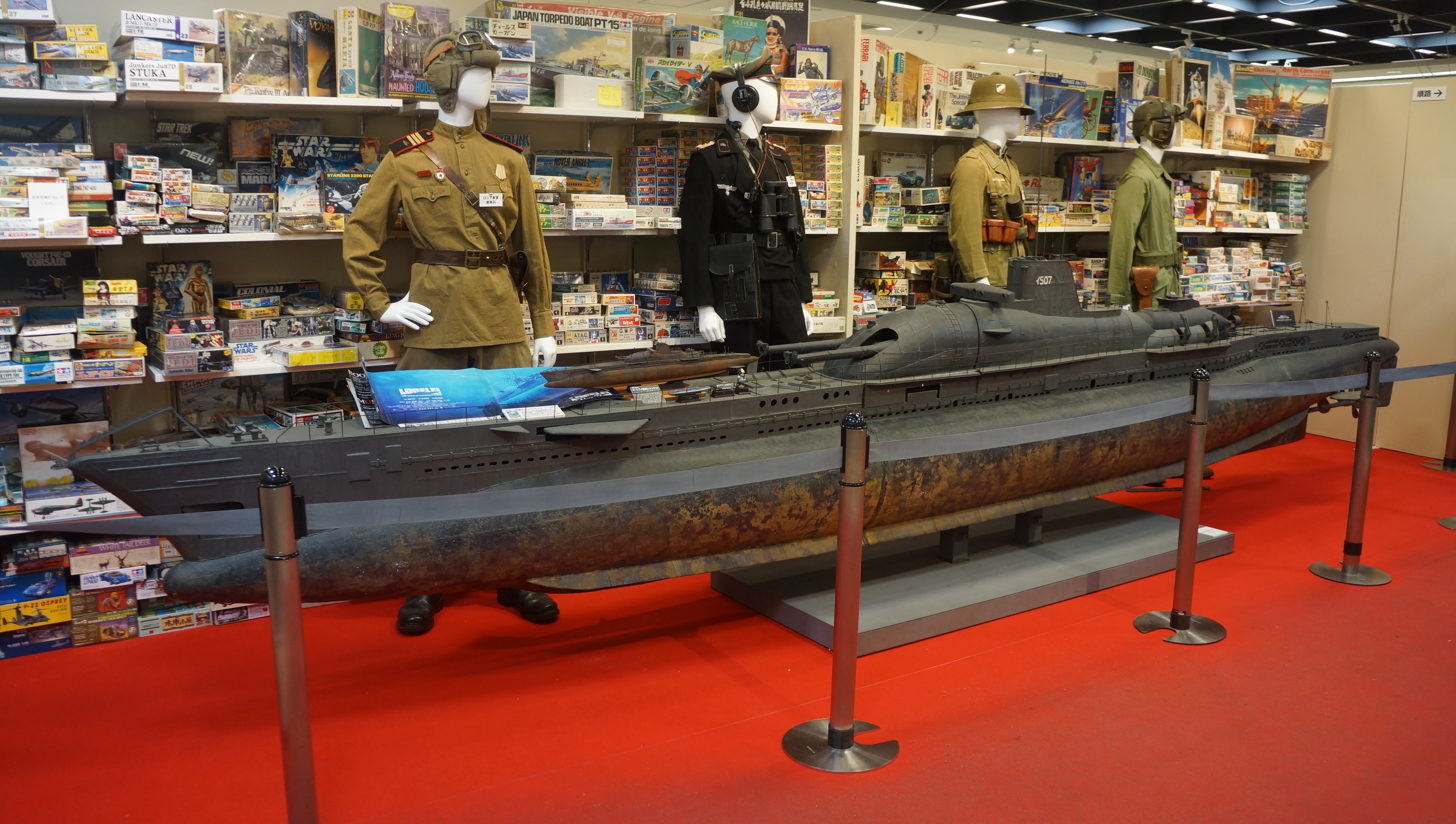
Scale model of I-507, sister ship of the French submarine Surcouf.

In the last months of World War II, the Empire of Japan receives a final gift from the collapsing Nazi Germany: the I-507, a highly advanced submarine equipped with experimental technology.

The mission, as revealed by the grim Chief of Staff Asakura (Shinichi Tsutsumi) following the atomic bombings of Hiroshima and Nagasaki, is to intercept U.S. ships transporting a third nuclear weapon to Tinian Island, the principal base from which American B-29s are striking the Japanese home Islands. The man charged with the mission is Commander Masami (Yakusho Kōji) - a brilliant destroyer of enemy ships relieved of his command when he opposed the Navy's increasing reliance on suicide tactics. Given a last chance to redeem himself, he is burning with zeal, but is ignorant of the various secrets the I-507 carries on board.

Once at sea, Lt. Takasu (Ken Ishiguro), the owlish technician in charge of the imaging system, refuses to tell Masami what it is or how it works. Masami also discovers that two crew members belong to the Kaiten suicide corps. He has no idea why they are there, and neither, for the moment, do they.

Meanwhile, the U.S. Navy is tracking the I-507 with more than usual interest. A teenage girl (Yu Kashi) is part of the master plan and one of the minisub pilots (Satoshi Tsumabuki) becomes her protector.

== Cast ==
- Kōji Yakusho as Shinichi Masami
- Satoshi Tsumabuki as Yukito Orikasa
- Toshirō Yanagiba as Kizaki Toshiro
- Yu Kashii as Paula Atsuko Ebner
- Shin'ichi Tsutsumi as Asakura Ryokitsu
- Ken Ishiguro as Narumi Takasu
- Isao Hashizume as Sadamoto Nishimiya
- Masato Ibu as Eitaro Narazaki
- Takaya Kamikawa as writer / narrator
- Kreva as Shunpei Komatsu
- Jun Kunimura as Matoi Tokioka
- Takehiko Ono as Shichigoro Iwamura
- Shugo Oshinari as Shōi Tsuchiya
- Ryuta Sato as Kikuo Kiyonaga
- Pierre Takias Tokutaro Taguchi
- Yoshiyuki Tomino as Mamiya
- Shingo Tsurumi as Sankichi Oominato
- Gordon Wells as Lieutenant Eric Minott
  - Colter Allison as Young Eric Minott
- Tyrone Power Jr. as Captain Fred Jacobs
- Fred Spiker as Warrant Officer Nick Nelson
- David Austin as Lieutenant Frank Dodet
- Christopher Ryan Doyle as Captain's Talker

== Release ==
=== Box office ===
Release Date: March 5, 2005 (Japan) Budget: ¥1,200,000,000 / $11,500,000 (Rough Figure) Opening Weekend: ¥305,302,906 / $2,914,308 (Japan, 263 Screens) Attendance Total: 1,900,000 (Japan) Total: ¥2,400,000,000 / $23,000,000 (Japan, Rough Figure)

=== Critical response ===
Mark Schilling wrote on ScreenDaily that "[Higuchi] and his team may not have had a Hollywood-sized budget, but their I-507 is a swift, dark, muscular thing of beauty. Depth charge explosions, with camera shakes by cinematographer Akira Sato and sonic booms courtesy of Skywalker Sound, are appropriately stomach-churning and teeth-rattling."

== Sources ==
- Lorelei at IMDb
- "Variety Japan" ローレライ (in Japanese). Variety (Japanese edition).
- Schilling, Mark (March 25, 2005). "Lorelei: The Witch Of The Pacific Ocean". Screen International (1494): 24.
