= Hakuba no Ōji-sama =

Japanese manga series

- First tankōbon volume cover

ハクバノ王子サマ
- Genre: Romance
- Manga
- Written by: Yukizō Saku
- Published by: Shogakukan
- Magazine: Big Comic Spirits
- Original run: April 25, 2005 – May 26, 2008
- Volumes: 10
- Television drama
- Original network: NNS (ytv, NTV)
- Original run: 3 October 2013 – 26 December 2013
- Episodes: 13

Hakuba no Ōji-sama (ハクバノ王子サマ; lit. "Prince on a White Horse", referring to Prince Charming) is a Japanese manga series written and illustrated by Yukizō Saku. It was adapted into a Japanese television drama series.

== Media ==
=== Manga ===
Written and illustrated by Yukizō Saku, Hakuba no Ōji-sama was serialized in Shogakukan's seinen manga magazine Weekly Big Comic Spirits from April 25, 2005, to May 26, 2008. Shogakukan collected is chapters in ten tankōbon volumes, released from August 30, 2005, to June 30, 2008.

=== Drama ===
==== Cast ====
- Yūka as Takako Hara
- Takahiro Miura as Kōtarō Ozu
- Shunsuke Nakamura as Akio Kurosawa
- Hirofumi Arai as Nobuo Egawa
- Mayuko Kawakita as Kaori Higashiyama
- Mio Yūki as Kotomi Ichikawa
