= The Death Note =

- Poster
- Chinese: 死亡笔记
- Directed by: Jiang Jun
- Screenplay by: Jiang Jun
- Starring: Cao Feiran; Li Zheng; Li Ben
- Production companies: Shanghai Huayu Xingku Media; Beijing Huasheng Dingfeng Entertainment; Shanghai Zhaoyang Entertainment
- Distributed by: Shanghai Zhaoyang Entertainment; Beijing Huanying Shidai Media
- Release date: 20 May 2016
- Running time: 93 minutes
- Country: China
- Language: Mandarin
- Box office: CN¥3.7 million

The Death Note (simplified Chinese: 死亡笔记; traditional Chinese: 死亡筆記; pinyin: Sǐwángbǐjì) is a 2016 Chinese horror suspense thriller film directed by Jiang Jun and starring Cao Feiran, Li Zheng and Li Ben. It was released in China by Shanghai Zhaoyang Entertainment and Beijing Huanying Shidai Media on 20 May 2016.

The film mainly tells the story of Liang Qian, a rebellious young woman, who caused her grandmother's accidental death, and the notes left behind by her grandmother after her death record the mystery of her life.

== Cast ==
- Cao Feiran
- Li Zheng
- Li Ben

== Reception ==
The film grossed CN¥3.7 million at the Chinese box office.
