= Shunji Fujimura =

Japanese actor

- Born: December 8, 1934; Kamakura, Kanagawa, Empire of Japan
- Died: January 25, 2017 (aged 82)
- Occupation(s): Actor, voice actor, narrator
- Years active: 1960–2015

Shunji Fujimura (藤村 俊二, Fujimura Shunji, December 8, 1934 – January 25, 2017) was a Japanese actor from Kamakura, Kanagawa, Japan. He appeared in the second series of Monkey as the horse. He appeared in the Death Note live-action movie as Quillsh Wammy A.K.A. Watari.

== Filmography ==
=== Film ===
- Seishun kigeki: Harenchi gakuen (1970)
- Kigeki kankon-sousai nyûmon (1970) - Fujiwara
- Tokyo Heaven (1990) - Katsu Hashimoto
- Welcome Back, Mr. McDonald (1997) - Mansaku Iori
- Hakuchi (1999) - The tailor
- Ultraman Cosmos: The First Contact (2001) - Professor Kinomoto
- Quartet (2001) - Shunkichi Fujioka
- Ganryujima (2003) - Todoroki
- Hero? Tenshi ni aeba... (2004)
- Gosuto shauto (2004)
- Kogitsune Heren (2006) - Professor Uehara
- Hatsukoi (2006) - Motorcycle seller
- Death Note (2006) - Watari
- Death Note 2: The Last Name (2006) - Watari
- Helen the Baby Fox (2006) - Manager of Coffee Lounge
- L: Change the WorLd (2008) - Watari
- Bura bura ban ban (2008)
- Fukemon (2008)
- Nakumonka (2009)
- Kyôretsu môretsu! Kodai shôjo Dogu-chan matsuri! Supesharu mûbî edishon (2010)
- Futatabi (2010) - Kenzaburo's bandmate

=== Television ===
- Monkey (1979) - Hazama Hyôsuke
- Osama no Restaurant (1995)
- Sōrito Yobanaide (1997) - Vice prime
- Fukigen na Kajitsu (1997)
- Kamisan nanka kowakunai (????)
- Oatsui no ga Osuki (????)
- Omizu no Hanamichi (1999) - Matsushima
- Rikon Bengoshi (2004)
- Kaiki Daikazoku (2004) - Fuchio Imawano
- Fight (2005)
- Densha Otoko DX~Saigo no Seizen (2006) - Saori's Grandfather
- Imo Tako Nankin (2006)
- Happy Boys (2007) - Kura Shikawaichi

=== Anime ===
- The Mouse and His Child (1977) - Ralphie
- Nutcracker Fantasy (1979) - Indian Wiseman
- Black Butler (2008-2009, TV Series) - Tanaka
- Black Butler II (2010, TV Series) - Tanaka
- Black Butler: Book of Circus (2014, TV Series) - Tanaka

=== Dubbing ===
- Watership Down - Kehaar
