= Death Note (2006 film) =

2006 film by Shusuke Kaneko

- Theatrical release poster
- Directed by: Shusuke Kaneko
- Screenplay by: Tetsuya Oishi
- Based on: Death Note by: Tsugumi Ohba; Takeshi Obata
- Produced by: Toyoharu Fukuda; Takahiro Kohashi; Takahiro Satō
- Starring: Tatsuya Fujiwara; Kenichi Matsuyama; Shunji Fujimura; Takeshi Kaga; Yuu Kashii; Asaka Seto; Shigeki Hosokawa; Erika Toda
- Cinematography: Hiroshi Takase
- Edited by: Yosuke Yafune
- Music by: Kenji Kawai
- Production companies: Nikkatsu Studio; Nippon Television
- Distributed by: Warner Bros. Pictures
- Release date: June 17, 2006
- Running time: 125 minutes
- Country: Japan
- Language: Japanese
- Budget: ¥2 billion (US$20 million)
- Box office: $31.3 million

Death Note (デスノート, Desu Nōto) is a 2006 Japanese supernatural thriller film directed by Shusuke Kaneko. It is based on the manga series of the same title by Tsugumi Ohba and Takeshi Obata. The film primarily centers on a Tokyo college student who attempts to change the world into a utopian society without crime, by committing a worldwide massacre of criminals and people whom he deems morally unworthy of life, through a supernatural notebook that kills anyone whose name is written in its pages, while being hunted down by an elite task force of law enforcement officers within Tokyo, led by an enigmatic international detective.

It was followed by a sequel, Death Note 2: The Last Name, released in the same year. A spin-off film directed by Hideo Nakata and titled L: Change the World, was released on February 9, 2008. Another sequel, Death Note: Light Up the New World, was released in October 2016.

== Plot ==
Light Yagami is an extremely intelligent university student who resents crime and corruption in the world. His life undergoes a drastic change when he discovers a mysterious notebook, known as the "Death Note", lying on the ground. The Death Note's instructions claim that if a human's name is written within it, that person shall die. Light is initially skeptical of the notebook's authenticity, but after experimenting with it, Light realizes that the Death Note is real. After meeting with the previous owner of the Death Note, a Shinigami named Ryuk, Light seeks to become "the God of the New World" by passing his judgment on those he deems to be evil or who get in his way.

Soon, the number of inexplicable deaths of reported criminals catches the attention of Interpol, as well as a mysterious detective known only as "L". L quickly deduces that the murderer, dubbed by the public as Kira (a Japanese approximation of the English word "killer"), is located in Japan. L also concludes that Kira can kill people without laying a finger on them. Light realizes that L will be his greatest nemesis, and a game of psychological "cat and mouse" between the two begins.

Light, pursued by L and by FBI detective Raye Iwamatsu, outsmarts them, killing Raye and his partners in the process. When Raye's fiancée, a former FBI detective named Naomi Misora, kidnaps Light's girlfriend Shiori Akino, Light pleads for her safety. Naomi accidentally shoots Shiori before taking her own life as the police approach. Light acts sorrowful for his girlfriend's death and asks to join the Kira investigation to get revenge, but he reveals to Ryuk that in fact he had learned Naomi's name beforehand and engineered the deaths of both Naomi and Shiori. The end of the film features Misa Amane, who survives an attempt on her life as her would-be assailant has a mysterious heart attack.

== Cast ==
=== Original ===
- Tatsuya Fujiwara as Light Yagami
- Kenichi Matsuyama as L / Ryûzaki
- Erika Toda as Misa Amane
- Asaka Seto as Naomi Misora
- Shidou Nakamura as the voice of Ryuk
- Shigeki Hosokawa as Raye Iwamatsu
- Shunji Fujimura as Watari
- Takeshi Kaga as Souichirou Yagami
- Yuu Kashii as Shiori Akino
- Hikari Mitsushima as Sayu Yagami
- Shin Shimizu as Kanzou Mogi
- Matt Lagan as Lind L. Taylor
- Michiko Godai as Sachiko Yagami
- Tatsuhito Okuda as Shuuichi Aizawa
- Sota Aoyama as Touta Matsuda
- Ikuji Nakamura as Hirokazu Ukita
- Masanori Fujita as Ryotarou Sakajou
- Norman England as an FBI agent
- Ai Maeda as Ayako Yoshino
- Takeo Nakahara as Matsubara
- Yoji Tanaka as Sasaki
- Masahiko Tsugawa as Saeki
- Miyuki Komatsu as Sanami
- Sarutoki Miyagama as Kiichirou Osoreda
- Kaohiko Kaota as Takuo Shibuimaru
- Toshiyuki Watari as Yuusuke Hibisawa

=== English dub ===
- Brad Swaile as Light Yagami
- Alessandro Juliani as L
- Shannon Chan-Kent as Misa Amane
- Nicole Oliver as Naomi Misora
- Brian Drummond as Ryuk
- Michael Adamthwaite as Raye Iwamatsu
- Ron Halder as Watari
- Christopher Britton as Souichirou Yagami
- Ashleigh Ball as Shiori Akino
- Kristie Marsden as Sayu Yagami
- John Murphy as Kanzou Mogi
- Ted Cole as Lind L. Taylor
- Saffron Henderson as Sachiko Yagami
- Trevor Devall as Shuuichi Aizawa
- Vincent Tong as Touta Matsuda
- Jeremy From as Hirokazu Ukita
- Michael Donovan as Ryotarou Sakajou
- Ron Halder as Matsubara
- Bill Switzer as Sasaki
- Janyse Jaud as Sanami
- Brian Dobson as Kiichirou Osoreda
- Louis Chirillo as Takuo Shibuimaru
- Louis Chirillo as Yuusuke Hibisawa

== Production ==
=== Development ===
In his production notes, director Shusuke Kaneko explained his desire to convince audiences that, while the killing of bad humans may seem to be fair, it underestimates the corrupting influence of wielding such power (the manga series follows a very similar viewpoint). Kaneko also commented that the psychological fear of dying could be "more nightmarish than Kaiju (monsters) destroying cities and killing people".

Kaneko also stated that he wanted the film to "focus on psychological pain", explain how the deaths occur, and explain how younger people would begin to like Kira. He also removed many of the interior monologues prominent in the manga and anime to allow audiences to develop their own ideas about the characters' thoughts and beliefs, while allowing "dramatic tension".

Kaneko said that the most difficult portion of the manga to film was the scene when the investigation begins and the authorities conclude that a person is responsible for the killing of criminals. He chose to add a scene in which L explains his logic via his laptop in order to make the film "more believable" and "excite people" for the coming struggle between L and Light.

Kaneko indicated mixed feelings while directing the movie. He said that he felt "a little reservation" at how the movie would perform, since the film "uses 'death' to entertain the audience" and feels "morally unsettling". Kaneko theorized that the film may have performed well because of the Internet culture of Japan, saying that the use of the Death Note had similarities to how users attacked one another on message boards and blogs. In addition, Kaneko noted that death is "carefully" concealed, to the point where "people don't even think about it".

The owner of the Death Note copyright required Kaneko to not change any of the rules of the Death Note, and as the film was developed, new rules of the Death Note were added in the original manga. Kaneko described adhering to this condition as the most difficult aspect of making the film.

=== Filming ===
Kaneko chartered an underground line to film a particular scene in the first film; this was the first time in Japanese film history that an underground line was used. Kaneko used about 500 extras throughout the first film.

== Music ==
=== Theme songs ===
- "Manatsu no Yoru no Yume" by Shikao Suga
- "Dani California" by Red Hot Chili Peppers (Closing)

== Release ==
The film premiered in Japan on June 17, 2006, and topped the Japanese box office for two weeks, pushing The Da Vinci Code into second place.

Death Note (死亡筆記) was released in Hong Kong on August 10, 2006, in Taiwan on September 8, 2006, in Singapore on October 19, 2006, and in Malaysia on November 9, 2006, with English and Chinese subtitles. The world premiere was in the UA Langham Place cinema in Hong Kong on October 28, 2006, the first Japanese movie to premiere in Hong Kong. The film was released in the UK on April 25, 2008.

Wired's Lisa Katayama described the film as "a delightfully suspenseful 126 minutes for anyone who likes suspense, pretty Japanese boys or female detectives".

=== North American release ===
The first movie briefly played in certain North American theaters on May 20–21, 2008. The theatrical version featured actors from the English dub of the anime voicing over their respective characters with a few notable recasts, including Ted Cole as Lind L. Taylor's voice (dubbed in the anime by John Murphy), Ron Halder as Watari's voice (dubbed in the anime by French Tickner), Nicole Oliver as Naomi Misora's voice (dubbed in the anime by Tabitha St. Germain), and Michael Dobson as Rem's voice (dubbed in the anime by Colleen Wheeler). The film was broadcast in Canadian theaters for one night only on September 15, 2008. The DVD was released on September 16, 2008, one day after the Canadian showing.

=== UK release ===
Death Note, Death Note: The Last Name, and L: Change the World were all licensed for UK release by 4Digital Asia, a sublabel of 4Digital Media, formerly Ilc Entertainment. The first title was the inaugural release in this new sublabel, launched in 2008 to fill the gap in the UK for "Asia Extreme" titles created by the demise of Tartan. All have received limited theatrical screenings at arthouse venues around the UK, such as the ICA Cinema in central London. All three have received DVD releases in limited editions, featuring two discs in hardback-book-like packaging, mimicking the item of the title. Regular single-disc editions are replacing the limited ones for long-term release. A dedicated website focused on the franchise was also created for public use. Both films were also broadcast on Film4.

=== Home media ===
On home video, the DVD releases of Death Note and Death Note 2: The Last Name sold over 1.027 million units in Japan as of March 2007.

== Reception ==
=== Box office ===
At the Japanese box office, the film grossed ¥2.85 billion ($24.5 million). Overseas, the film grossed $6,758,126, including over $3.7 million in South Korea and US$1.9 million in Hong Kong. This brings the film's worldwide box office gross to $31,258,126.

=== Critical response ===
On Rotten Tomatoes, the film received a 78% approval rating based on 9 reviews, with an average rating of 6.4/10.

Hidayah Idris wrote in the Singapore edition of the magazine Cleo that the film was "a major hit in Singapore!"

== Accolades ==
Award nominations for Death Note
| Year | Award | Category | Recipient | Result |
|---|---|---|---|---|
| 2006 | Hochi Film Award | Best New Actor | Kenichi Matsuyama | Won |
| 2007 | Award of the Japanese Academy | Best Supporting Actor | Kenichi Matsuyama | Nominated |
| 2007 | Brussels International Festival of Fantasy Film | Pegasus Audience Award | Best Film | Won |
| 2007 | Hong Kong Film Award | Best Asian Film | Japan | Nominated |
| 2007 | Mainichi Film Concours | Readers' Choice Award | Most Popular Film | Won |
| 2007 | Yokohama Film Festival | Best New Talent | Kenichi Matsuyama | Won |

== Sequel ==
A sequel, Death Note 2: The Last Name, was released in Japan on October 28, 2006

== American adaptation (Netflix) ==
In 2007, the Malaysian newspaper The Star stated that more than ten film companies in the United States had expressed interest in the Death Note franchise. The American production company Vertigo Entertainment was originally set to develop the remake, with Charley and Vlas Parlapanides as screenwriters and Roy Lee, Doug Davison, Dan Lin, and Brian Witten as producers. On April 30, 2009, Variety reported that Warner Bros., the distributors for the original Japanese live-action films, had acquired the rights for an American remake, with the original screenwriters and producers still attached. In 2009, Zac Efron responded to rumors that he would be playing the film's lead role by stating that the project was "not on the front burner". On April 27, 2015, The Hollywood Reporter revealed that Adam Wingard would direct the film, that Lin, Lee, Jason Hoffs and Masi Oka would produce, and that Niija Kuykendall and Nik Mavinkurve would oversee the studio. Producers stated the film would receive an R rating. On April 6, 2016, it was confirmed that Netflix had bought the film from Warner Bros., and released on August 25, 2017.

== See also ==
- List of films based on manga
