= Kumo no Kaidan =

Novel by Junichi Watanabe

Kumo no Kaidan (雲の階段; Cloud's Stairs) is a 1982 Japanese novel by Junichi Watanabe. The story has been adapted for television three times.

== 1983 adaptation ==
The 1983 television adaptation was titled Kumo no Kaidan: Nise Ishi o Meguru Onna Futari (雲の階段 ニセ医師をめぐる女二人).

== 2006 adaptation ==
The 2006 adaptation is a Korean show titled Cloud's Stairs (Korean: 구름계단).

== 2013 adaptation ==
The latest adaptation stars Hiroki Hasegawa as the main character. This series began on 17 April 2013.
