= Yuu Kashii =

Japanese actress and model

Yuu Kashii 香椎 由宇
- Born: Yuuko Kashii; February 16, 1987 (age 39); Ayase, Kanagawa, Japan
- Occupations: Actress; model
- Years active: 2001–present
- Spouse: Joe Odagiri (m. 2008)
- Children: 3

Yūko Odagiri (小田切 悠子, Odagiri Yūko; born February 16, 1987), known by her stage name Yuu Kashii (香椎 由宇, Kashii Yuu), is a Japanese actress and model. She studied at Mejiro University, where she majored in English.

== History ==
=== Personal life ===
She married actor Joe Odagiri, who is exactly 11 years her senior, on February 16, 2008, the birthday the couple share. She gave birth to two sons in both February 2011 and April 2014. The youngest son died a year later due to an intestinal obstruction.

Kashii's maternal grandfather is a European-American newspaper reporter, and thus her ethnic background is ¼ European. Kashii spent her childhood in Singapore and attended elementary school there. She has been said to have exactly the same dimensions for her right and left side of the face which led to a German doctor wanting to use her face as a specimen for research uses.

=== Biography ===
Kashii got her start in the entertainment business as an in-house model for the Japanese teen magazine mc Sister in 2001. Her first acting role was in the movie adaptation of Lorelei: The Witch of the Pacific Ocean in which she played the title character.

== Filmography ==
=== Film ===
Year	Title	Role	Notes	Ref.
2005	Linda Linda Linda	Kei Tachibana		
2005	Lorelei: The Witch of the Pacific Ocean	Paula Atsuko Ebner		
2006	Death Note	Shiori Akino		
2025	Gosh!!			
2026	Memorizu			
2026	Dot to Dot: Will I Be Single Forever?	Shimizu		
2027	Sins of Kujo: The Movie	Reiko Kameoka		

=== Television ===
Year	Title	Role	Notes	Ref.
2007	Yukan Club	Noriko Hakushika		
2007	Detective Conan: Confrontation with the Men in Black	Shiho Miyano		
2026	Sins of Kujo	Reiko Kameoka		

=== Video games ===
Year	Title	Role	Notes	Ref.
2005	Genji: Dawn of the Samurai	Lady Shizuka	PS2 Japanese version	

== Awards and nominations ==
Year	Award	Category	Work(s)	Result	Ref.
2008	11th Nikkan Sports Drama Grand Prix	Best Supporting Actress	Yukan Club	Won	
