= Mello (Death Note) =

Fictional character from Death Note

- Death Note character
- Mello, as drawn by Takeshi Obata
- First appearance: Chapter 59: "Zero" (零, Rei) (2005)
- Last appearance: Chapter 99: "Two" (二人, Futari) (2006)
- Created by: Tsugumi Ohba; Takeshi Obata
- Voiced by: Japanese; Nozomu Sasaki; English; David Hurwitz
- Portrayed by: Mio Yūki

In-universe information
- Full name: Mihael Keehl
- Alias: Mello; M
- Gender: Male

Mihael Keehl (Japanese: ミハエル・ケール, Hepburn: Mihaeru Kēru), universally referred to by the mononym Mello (メロ, Mero), is a fictional character in the manga series Death Note, created by Tsugumi Ohba and Takeshi Obata. Mello is introduced alongside Near as a potential substitute for L. Both Mello and Near were raised at Wammy's House, an orphanage established by Watari, L's assistant. However, Mello refuses to work with Near to capture a murderer dubbed "Kira". Over the course of the series, he joins the mafia, obtains a Death Note, causes the death of some people, and dies before he can expose Kira's identity. Mello has also appeared in other media from the series.

The character of Mello was created, along with Near, to break the endless cycle of confrontations between the detective L and Light Yagami, the man behind the persona Kira. Both Mello and Near were designed after L and were initially envisioned as twins and sons of L. Ultimately, this idea was dropped, with their designs switched compared to the original concept.

He is voiced in the Japanese anime series by Nozomu Sasaki and in the English adaptation by David Hurwitz. Merchandise has been created for the character, including plush dolls and action figures. Mello has received positive commentary from manga and anime publications.

== Appearances ==
=== In Death Note ===
Mello, whose real name is Mihael Keehl, grew up in Wammy's House, an orphanage for intellectually gifted children, and is one of two potential successors to L—the best detective in the world. When L dies, it is proposed to him to work with Near, the other potential successor, to find L's murderer, a criminal dubbed "Kira". Mello rejects the proposal, citing their bad relationship and different personalities. Then, he leaves the orphanage and joins the Mafia. Aware of a Death Note—a book that allows anyone to murder individuals just by knowing their faces and names—in Japanese police's possession, Mello abducts its director; Kira, however, kills the director. Afterwards, Mello proceeds to kidnap Sayu Yagami, the daughter of the police's vice-director, Soichiro Yagami; Mello succeeds in obtaining the Death Note this time.

Light Yagami, the true identity of Kira, discovers the location of Mello's hideout. An indirect result of this is that Mello meets the Shinigami Sidoh, the original owner of Mello's Death Note. Sidoh reveals to him—in exchange for some of Mello's chocolate—that there are two extra fake rules (in addition to a number of real ones specified to each Death Note's owner). Mello begins to theorize that whoever Kira is, he probably used these spurious rules to fool the Japanese police into thinking he is innocent. However, Light launches a SWAT team led by Soichiro to raid the hideout. In order to escape, Mello detonates remote-controlled explosives, after one of his Mafia accomplices fatally wounds Soichiro. Mello is left with a scar on his face, and the failure of his Mafia scheme leaves his real name in Light's hands.

Mello invades SPK—an organization that aims to catch Kira—to retrieve a photograph of himself from Near. Before he leaves SPK, Mello tells Near about Sidoh and the fake rules, which sharpens Near's suspicions on Light. Mello then enlists the help of his friend Matt to spy on Misa Amane, suspecting she is helping Kira. After learning that Light is Kira and Near is going to attempt to apprehend him, Mello and Matt kidnap Kiyomi Takada, Kira's spokesperson. Matt pretends to attack Takada, and Mello offers to take her to safety. Takada agrees but then realizes his identity. Mello forces her to strip naked to get rid of any tracking devices. However, Takada uses a hidden piece of Death Note paper to kill Mello, as Light had told her his name and what to do in such a situation. Mello's actions ultimately lead to Light's downfall; Teru Mikami uses the hidden real Death Note to try to kill Takada, which leads to Near learning that the notebook Mikami had been using prior is fake and swapping the real Death Note with his own fake for the final confrontation with Kira.

=== In the live-action drama ===
In the live-action television drama, a major change is made to this character; Mello is not a character on his own and rather is the other half of Near's split personality, living inside of Near's body. As such, he is interpreted by the same actress that takes the role of Near, Mio Yūki. In the first episode, this is not clear and he is first presented as a puppet in Near's hand. After knowing that L is killed, Mello possesses Near and teams up with FBI agent Shōko Himura. Mello takes Himura's help to kidnap Sayu Yagami in order to obtain the Death Note. Light Yagami makes Himura blow up Mello's hideout with the help of Death Note. Mello survives the bombing and, over the phone, vows to expose Light as Kira. Light plans another ambush with the task force and Japanese police in order to defeat Mello. Later, Light meets with Misa and Mikami and orders them to kill the task force and Mello respectively. During the ambush, Light confronts Mello in a warehouse, who reverts to his Near personality. Near reveals that he pretended to be taken over by Mello as part of a plan to expose Mikami as the current Kira.

=== In other media ===
Aside from the initial manga, Mello appears in other media based on Death Note. He serves as the narrator of Nisio Isin's light novel Death Note Another Note: The Los Angeles BB Murder Cases. He is featured in two video games; in Death Note: L o Tsugu Mono, he can serve as L, and in the Weekly Shōnen Jump-based fighting game Jump Ultimate Stars, he is a support character. Mello also appears in the animated special Death Note: Relight 2: L's Successors, which retells the second half of the anime. In it, his story is almost the same, the only exception is that Mello's involvement with the mafia is removed.

== Creation and conception ==
Tsugumi Ohba, Death Note's writer, introduced Near and Mello together because he felt L individually could not defeat Kira and that introducing only one new character would produce a "repeat" of the struggle between Light and L. Ohba asked Takeshi Obata, artist of the series, to make both characters look "a little 'L-ish.'" Ohba "wavered" in their ages and considered making the characters the sons of L. As Ohba wanted to "include a little L" in Near and Mello, Obata tried to keep "the weirdness and the panda eyes". Since L is an important character, Obata felt that he had made Near and Mello look too much like L. When he first heard about Near and Mello, Obata assumed that they would join as a team and work together, so he envisioned the two as twins, describing the creation of the character designs as "a major struggle". At first, he tried to depict Mello as having "more energy than Near". However, the designs for the characters became switched at a later phase; the final Mello had Near's design and vice versa. When Obata created the designs, his editor wrote the wrong names to accompany them; when Obata received approval for the designs, it was too late to point out that the labels were incorrect. Initially, for him, Mello was "more calm and feminine", but later he felt that "it's better" that the switch occurred.

Ohba did not initially develop Mello and Near's personalities as he wanted to "reveal" them through their actions. He added the chocolate trait because he believed that chocolate "represented all sweets" and that the trait would fit with the story arc in the United States. Obata designed Mello's clothing based on clothes he enjoys drawing, which includes "shiny" leather. At first, Mello's hair was cut straight across; Obata preferred Mello's hair becoming messy, which occurred later in the story. Obata became grateful when Ohba added the scar since he felt that he could draw Mello "looking cooler". Ohba added Mello's scar to the thumbnails as the trait would give him "more depth"; he further added Mello looks "more intense" and "more human" with the scar. After drawing Mello's updated appearance with the scar, Obata "finally [felt that he could draw Mello] really well". Obata said that the fact that Ohba and Obata did not regularly meet in person was for the best because if Obata had told Ohba about his satisfaction with Mello's new appearance, Ohba might not have killed Mello. However, Obata felt sad when Mello died in the story shortly afterward.

Ohba considered having Mello be the character who ultimately defeats Light. According to Ohba, after the disappearance of Sidoh, the writer "struggled" with Mello's role. Ohba's idea of Mello ultimately defeating Light and Near, being "the best", was strong in his mind, but once Mello had "learned too much about the Death Note", he had to kill him to "sustain the intensity of the story". As a result, Ohba did not give Mello a "large role" at the conclusion of Death Note and instead had Mello negatively affect Light "indirectly". Ohba gave Mello a "very plain" death, depicted in only one panel; he felt that if Mello had perished "dramatically" it would reveal the truth behind his death.

== Reception ==
Merchandise based on his character has been released, including action figures and plush dolls. Moreover, several publications for manga and anime have commented on Mello's character. Referring to Mello and Near's introduction, Julie Rosato of Mania.com said the "focus on both makes for a clash of attitudes and rough transitions". However, as they were introduced in the anime, IGN's Tom S. Pepirium noted how it is not explained "what Mello is doing and how it differs from Near's story". Writing for Active Anime, Holly Ellingwood stated they "truly represent – Light's newest and greatest enemies", while Briana Lawrence from Anime News Network said both could be "much better characters" if they were treated as individuals. Erin Finnegan from Pop Culture Shock praised Death Note: The Last Name for the absence of Mello and Near. Anime News Network's Casey Brienza stressed Mello's presence as a narrator in the light novel "makes things a bit too breathless in places and a bit too self-conscious in others". A. E. Sparrow from IGN praised how the introduction of Mello, "a man of action", "spiced things up a bit" as he brought "actually" action to the series. Manga News said Mello is "an interesting character" as he is "unpredictable" and also praised the action scenes he brings. As such, they mentioned his almost total absence in volume 11 as he is "one of the few to bring some new blood to the series".

After Mello's death, Pepirium wrote "Mello deserved more." On the other hand, Mello is "an unhinged character that only offers unpredictability", according to Chris Beveridge of Mania.com. AnimeLand and Manga News presented opposite opinions if whether or not Mello is charismatic character, with the former declaring he does not replace L.

Rose Bridges of Anime News Network was generally favorable to Mello's depiction in the 2015 live-action drama. She likened him to a Mr. Hyde's side of Near, saying this way "Mello is also more interesting [...] than the pretty bad boy he was in the anime". By the ninth episode, Bridges commended how Mello was developed into an "integral part of things and a much more threatening presence" in the drama in comparison to his "clear side-antagonist" role in the manga. However, in the following episode, she noted how the character was depicted as a "chaotic psychopath" who "seems to just like destroying things". Bridges commented that originally he was dedicated to creating his own method to capture Kira, while in the TV show he looks more like Ryuk considering his "guns blazing" attitude.

== See also ==
- List of Death Note characters
