= List of Death Note characters =

The main characters of Death Note. From left to right: Misa Amane, Light Yagami, Ryuk, and L

The manga series Death Note features an extensive cast of fictional characters designed by Takeshi Obata with their storylines created by Tsugumi Ohba. The story follows the character named Light Yagami, who chances upon a supernatural notebook which grants him the ability to cause the death of anyone he writes in it. Light uses the notebook he finds in order to cleanse the world of humans he has deemed unfit for society. A team of professional investigators set out to find out the mysterious killer and arrest him, and thus many other characters are introduced until Light is eventually caught.

In the fictional stories featured in the Death Note universe, Tsugumi Ohba, the story writer, created characters that lived in a world featuring a notebook in which names written on it would lead to the ones named to die, typically the cause of death being a heart attack when otherwise not specified. Ohba chose names for his characters in a way that, as he described, "seemed real but could not exist in the real world", due to the fact that most of the characters were criminals or victims. Some character details differ between the manga and its anime, live-action film and drama adaptations.

== Main characters ==
=== Light Yagami ===
Light Yagami (夜神 月, Yagami Raito) is the protagonist of Death Note, a brilliant yet bored genius who adopts the alias "Kira" to cleanse the world of criminals. Created by Tsugumi Ohba and Takeshi Obata, he is portrayed as a ruthless, ego-driven character aiming to become the god of a new, crime-free world.

=== L Lawliet ===
L Lawliet (エル・ローライト, Eru Rōraito), known mononymously as L, is a world-renowned detective who takes on the challenge of catching the serial killer known as Kira. Despite his disheveled and scrawny appearance and eccentric habits, such as crouching instead of sitting and an obsessive consumption of sweets, he is a brilliant strategist. He becomes the primary antagonist to Light Yagami, whom he quickly suspects of being Kira, leading to a high-stakes battle of wits.

=== Ryuk ===
Ryuk (リューク, Ryūku) is a bored Shinigami that drops a Death Note, the notebook that allows the one in its possession to kill anyone simply by knowing their name and face, into the human world in order to have fun. It is picked up by Light Yagami, a young genius who uses it in an attempt to create and rule a world "cleansed of evil" as "God". He has an affinity for apples.

=== Misa Amane ===
Misa Amane (弥 海砂, Amane Misa), also known as "Misa-Misa", is a popular Japanese idol, who is known for her Gothic-style of dress, hyperactive personality and devotion to Light, falling in love with him after he kills Misa's parents' murderer. As a Death Note owner and the second Kira, she has the eyes of a Shinigami, which allow her to see nearly everyone's name and lifespan. However, she cannot see the lifespans of Death Note owners. As part of her career as an idol, she performs numerous jobs such as acting, singing and modeling.

=== Near ===
Voiced by: Noriko Hidaka (Japanese); Cathy Weseluck (English)

Near (ニア, Nia), whose real name is Nate River, is the young detective who succeeds L after his death, He is the head of an organization created to catch Kira, the SPK (Special Provision for Kira). A placid, pragmatic character with a sharp tongue, he has white hair and wears pale clothes. He constantly plays with toys, building towers of dice and playing cards, and illustrating his exposition with small finger puppets. He is seen completing blank puzzles, which emphasizes his problem-solving skills. He is the person who succeeds in identifying and capturing Light as Kira.

=== Mello ===
Mello (メロ, Mero), real name is Mihael Keehl, grows up in competition with Near to succeed L. After L's death, however, he concedes the position to Near and leaves to hunt Kira through criminal means, eventually joining the American Mafia. His obsession with surpassing Near serves as the primary motivation for many of his actions. He has blond hair, dresses extravagantly, and is rarely seen without a bar of chocolate.

=== Teru Mikami ===
Voiced by: Masaya Matsukaze (Japanese); Kirby Morrow (English)

Teru Mikami (魅上 照, Mikami Teru) is a criminal prosecutor and fanatical worshipper of Kira. When Light needs a new proxy to hide his identity, Light uses his intuition alone to select Mikami to become the fourth Kira. Since childhood, Mikami has had a strong sense of justice, but his views have become warped due to years of bullying and trauma. As an example of this, Mikami wishes to punish those he considers to be evil, which, to Light's dismay, includes unproductive people and reformed criminals. Mikami mutters the word "delete" (削除, sakujo) repeatedly whenever he uses the Death Note to commit his executions.

During the climax of manga's final arc, Mikami is captured by Near's team after unintentionally implicating Light and exposing the latter as Kira. Whereas Mikami dies in prison after going insane in the manga, he commits suicide by stabbing himself with his pen in the anime. Matsuda theorizes that Near wrote in the Death Note to manipulate Mikami's actions in order to lead Light to his defeat. In the second Death Note Rewrite special, Mikami is the one to kill the majority of SPK, Near's team of investigators, differing from the manga, in which Mello and the mafia are responsible for the SPK's deaths.

In the live action drama, his role is expanded upon. Portrayed by Shugo Oshinari, Mikami is introduced as the prosecutor handling the case of Kyu Nishida, the murderer of Misa's parents. He eventually deduces Misa's identity as the second Kira after accumulating information from Kira-related news. After stealing Misa's notebook to become Kira in her place, Mikami collaborates with Light to kill L. Mikami continues to work with Light until they are both caught by Near and the police in the Yellow Box warehouse. Mikami accidentally kills Light after he sets the warehouse on fire in an attempt to escape.

Mikami makes a cameo appearance in Death Note: Light Up the New World serving as the guardian to Light's young son. (Note: The son's name is written "夜神光". While 夜神 is Yagami, the film does not state how the character "光", the boy's given name, is pronounced.) Mikami murders the boy in order to steal the boy's notebook but is in turn killed by police officer Tsukuru Mishima. He is portrayed by Kensei Mikami in the film.

=== Minoru Tanaka ===
Minoru Tanaka (田中実, Tanaka Minoru) is the new possessor of the Death Note and the main protagonist of the one-shot sequel chapter The a-Kira Story (also titled Death Note: Special One Shot), where he decides to auction off the Death Note instead of using it. Having Ryuk go out to send his instructions to Sakura TV, he creates a hashtag to auction off the Death Note, ultimately leading to world governments bidding on the Death Note, ultimately getting the United States to bid ten trillion dollars for it, while various law enforcement agencies are out to catch Minoru, whom Near names "A-Kira". During that time though, the Shinigami King is infuriated by the idea of the Note itself being for sale, and creates a new rule to the Note. After the Note is paid for by depositing the money equally into the savings account of every Japanese person 60 or below, the new rule is revealed to be that anyone involved in the buying or selling of the Death Note will be killed upon fulfillment of the deal. The US president (Note: The text does not call him Donald Trump, though Hannah Collins of Comic Book Resources stated "the uncanny likeness to the divisive political figure is hard to miss.") balks at this, and secretly refuses to take ownership of the note (though mentioning he will publicly bluff about having it), and Minoru dies immediately after trying to cash out his payment.

== Supporting characters ==
=== Kira Investigation Team ===
==== Soichiro Yagami ====
Voiced by: Naoya Uchida (Japanese); Christopher Britton (English)

Soichiro Yagami (夜神 総一郎, Yagami Sōichirō) is Light's father and detective superintendent of Japan's National Police Agency. He initially leads the Kira investigation team that later joins with L. When L begins to suspect Light of being Kira, Soichiro is unwilling to believe his son would be capable of such a thing. After L's death, he is sent to retrieve the Death Note stolen by Mello by obtaining Shinigami Eyes and infiltrating Mello's hideout, though Light had planned for Matsuda to fill the role. He retrieves the note and learns Mello's real name but is unable to kill him and is instead fatally wounded. In the original manga and anime, because Light has given up his Death Note, making his lifespan visible above his head, Soichiro dies believing that Light is not Kira.

In the film series, Takeshi Kaga portrays Soichiro. The second film has Soichiro confront Light about his plans, and in that version, Light dies in his father's arms.

==== Touta Matsuda ====
Voiced by: Ryō Naitō (Japanese); Vincent Tong (English)

Touta Matsuda (松田 桃太, Matsuda Tōta; romanized as Tota Matsuda in Japanese media) is the youngest member of the Kira investigation team. His alias is Taro Matsui (松井 太郎, Matsui Tarō). Matsuda has the drive to match the other members of the team, but his lack of experience sometimes hinders the investigation. He becomes quite fond of Light throughout the series. He is also shown to be a massive fan of Misa, becoming quite upset when his death is faked and he can no longer work as her manager. It is hinted that Matsuda has an inferiority complex regarding his detective ability, and many of his coworkers feel annoyed by his behavior. Matsuda's "risky moves" sometimes place him in danger, and his "quick thinking" sometimes aids the investigation, such as his actions in the Yotsuba case that lead to Higuchi's detainment. Matsuda initially befriends Light and believes that he is not Kira, but at the end of the series, during the final showdown, he shoots Light 4 times to prevent him from killing Near.

==== Shuichi Aizawa ====
Voiced by: Keiji Fujiwara (Japanese); Trevor Devall (English)

Shuichi Aizawa (相沢 周市, Aizawa Shūichi) is a member of the Kira investigation team that leaves the team under the guise of needing to support his family because the Japanese police cut their funding (it is only after he leaves that it is revealed that L would have supported them had he stayed). Aizawa uses the alias Aihara (相原) to protect his identity. Aizawa returns shortly before L's death, after which he is one of the first to suspect Light of being Kira (although he continues to act compassionately towards Light until he is cornered and goes mad) and helps contribute to his eventual defeat. He becomes the leader of the investigation team afterward.

==== Kanzo Mogi ====
Voiced by: Kazuya Nakai (Japanese); John Murphy (English)

Kanzo Mogi (模木 完造, Mogi Kanzō) is one of the most dedicated members of the Kira investigation team, but also one of the most reserved. Mogi rarely speaks, even when someone presents an opinion he agrees with. Despite this, he has shown himself to be a particularly good detective. He is also an excellent actor, becoming an excited and cheery manager for Misa on demand and seemingly contradictory to his usual demeanor. He appears to be fond of Misa, as she nicknames him 'Motchi'. Mogi uses the alias Kanichi Moji (模地 幹一, Moji Kan'ichi) to protect his identity.

==== Hideki Ide ====
Voiced by: Hideo Ishikawa (Japanese); Brian Dobson (English)

Hideki Ide (伊出 英基, Ide Hideki) is one of the few police officers who remain with Soichiro during the Kira Investigation. He initially leaves when he disagrees with L's methods. Ide later returns and plays a relatively minor role in the Kira investigative team. He helps coordinate their efforts and performs actions such as organizing a blockade of police cars to trap Higuchi. Later, after L's death, he rejoins the investigation, though he states that he only did so to be with Aizawa. Ide trusts Light more than any of the other Task Force members, except for Light's father.

==== Hirokazu Ukita ====
Voiced by: Hidenobu Kiuchi (Japanese); Jeremy From (English)

Hirokazu Ukita (宇生田 広数, Ukita Hirokazu) is a member of the Kira investigation team that is led by L. He is characterized as a brave young man who is also a chronic smoker. When Misa has Sakura TV (さくらTV) broadcast a message from her as Kira, Ukita rushes to the station to stop the broadcast without any prompting by the rest of the team. Since Misa has the Shinigami Eyes, she kills Ukita as soon as he approaches the door.

=== Wammy's house ===
==== Watari ====
Voiced by: Kiyoshi Kobayashi (Japanese); French Tickner, Ron Halder (English)

Watari (ワタリ) is L's assistant, providing logistics to the investigation team. Before the team is formed, he is the only person who has seen L, and the only one capable of contacting L directly. Like L, he represents himself with an Old English "W" on computer screens. He is also a fatherly figure to L. On the surface, he is Quillsh Wammy (キルシュ・ワイミー, Kirushu Waimī), a famous inventor and founder of Wammy's House, an orphanage for gifted children in Winchester, England. Watari is well trained in espionage and marksmanship. Rem kills Watari, along with L, in order to protect Misa. At the end of the manga, Roger Ruvie, the manager of Wammy House, becomes the new Watari for the third L, Near. He is also old.

In the film, he is played by Shunji Fujimura, who felt that Watari's presence would "come alive" if he projected "the mood of this mysterious old gentleman without the air of livelihood."

==== Matt ====
Voiced by: Tomohiro Nishimura (Japanese); Drew Nelson (English)

Matt (マット, Matto), real name Mail Jeevas (マイル・ジーヴァス, Mairu Jīvasu), is a cohort of Mello's. Matt was also a former resident of Wammy's orphanage, being one of its most talented despite his laziness. He is a chain smoker with a fondness for video games. Matt is Mello's helper as he performs espionage work and acts as an accomplice in Takada's kidnapping, which results in his death when he is shot by Takada's bodyguards.

==== Roger Ruvie ====
Voiced by: Hiroshi Ōtake (Japanese); Ron Halder (English)

Roger Ruvie (ロジャー・ラヴィー, Rojā Ruvī) acts as the manager of Wammy's House. He is aware of L and Watari's detective work. Despite his work with children, he detests them. At the end of the series, he becomes the new Watari for Near.

==== Beyond Birthday ====
Beyond Birthday (ビヨンド・バースデイ, Biyondo Bāsudei), nicknamed BB, is a character exclusive to the prequel novel, Death Note Another Note: The Los Angeles BB Murder Cases. He is a serial murderer bent on surpassing L - not by being the world's greatest detective, but by being the world's greatest criminal. The novel takes place in August 2002, a year before Light became Kira. The only thing known about his past before going to Wammy's House is that his father was beaten to death by a thug and his mother died in a train crash. Like L, Mello, Matt and Near, he lived in Wammy's House and was known as B, which stood for "Backup." Beyond was born with the Shinigami Eyes, so he could see when humans would die and their names. Using his Shinigami Eyes, he would intentionally kill people on their destined day of death.

To fool Naomi Misora, he acted a bit strange during Naomi and L's investigation, calling himself Rue Ryuzaki (竜崎 ルエ, Ryūzaki Rue), with "Rue" being an anagram of the Japanese pronunciation of L (エル, Eru), and Ryuzaki being a nickname L later adopts. He was always in heavy makeup when with Naomi, so his true appearance is unknown. He killed 4 victims, Backyard Bottomslash, Quarter Queen, and Believe Bridesmaid, while leaving clues at each murder scene for Naomi Misora to "solve." In reality, he himself led her to each conclusion she made.

He attempts to commit suicide at the end of the novel, by setting himself on fire, to look like the final victim. He feels that L would never be able to solve the case if he, the murderer, were "murdered", meaning he would have outwitted L. Naomi Misora, however, figures out his plan at the last moment, saving Beyond Birthday's life while at the same time putting him under arrest for his murders. At the very end of the novel, the narrator, Mello, states that Beyond Birthday died of a mysterious heart attack several years later in prison. He was killed by Kira using the Death Note.

==== A ====
A is a former resident of Wammy's House and the original successor to L who is mentioned in Death Note Another Note: The Los Angeles BB Murder Cases. He is said to have committed suicide years earlier due to the pressure of living up to L.

=== C-Kira ===
C-Kira is a character of unknown identity, gender and age featured in the one-shot chapter The C-Kira Story (which is not featured in the anime) who receives a Death Note from the Shinigami Midora three years after Light's death and is known to have made the Shinigami eye deal with her. This person only uses the notebook to euthanize elderly people in Japan that wish to die and is dubbed "C-Kira", short for "Cheap Kira", by Near. After Near (as L) announces he is not interested in the case and condemns this Kira as an "abominable murderer", C-Kira commits suicide by writing his own name in the Death Note.

=== Associates of L Lawliet ===
==== Aiber ====
Voiced by: Takuya Kirimoto (Japanese); David Orth (English)

Aiber (アイバー, Aibā), real name Thierry Morello (ティエリ・モレロ, Tieri Morero), is a professional con man in the employ of L. He plays the role of Eraldo Coil (エラルド・コイル, Erarudo Koiru), one of L's detective aliases, during the investigation of the Yotsuba Group. Aiber uses his initial "A", just like L, when communicating through computers. Aiber speaks many languages and uses many false identities. He also has a talent for using his good looks to convince women to pass information to him. Aiber enjoys living life on the edge and his biggest thrill comes from conning people.

After L's death, Light kills him using the Death Note. In the manga, Aiber dies from liver cancer at a hospital in Paris, France with his family at his bedside. In the anime, he dies of a heart attack in front of his wife and son. He, like Wedy, is referenced to, but does not appear in, Death Note: Another Note.

==== Wedy ====
Voiced by: Miki Nagasawa (Japanese); Venus Terzo (English)

Wedy (ウエディ, Uedi), real name Mary Kenwood (メリー・ケンウッド, Merī Ken'uddo; (romanized as Merrie Kenwood in Japanese media)), is a professional burglar in the employ of L. She installs bugs in the Yotsuba Group's meeting room to secretly observe the group's weekly meetings. She does the same for Higuchi's car, allowing the team to watch his desperate attempts to kill Matsuda.

Wedy uses her initial in computer communication; to avoid confusion with Watari ("W"), she deliberately uses the lowercase form, "w". After L's death, Light kills her using his Death Note; Wedy dies in a motorcycle accident in Colorado. She, like Aiber, is referenced to, but does not appear in, Death Note: Another Note.

=== Associates of Kira ===
==== Kiyomi Takada ====
Kiyomi Takada (高田 清美, Takada Kiyomi) first appears for a short period as Light Yagami's classmate and girlfriend; Light appears with Takada in public to disguise the fact that he also converseds with Misa. She returns five years later in the story as an announcer of NHN chosen by Teru Mikami to be Kira's spokesperson to the world. Light realizes that he can use this connection with Takada to his advantage and sets up a meeting with her, presumably for the benefit of the investigation. While the two meet, Takada receives a call from Mikami and Light reveals himself to Mikami as Kira. They create a ploy to force the Kira Investigation Team to remove all bugs from the room, after which Light tells Takada that he wants her to be his goddess in the new world.

==== Hitoshi Demegawa ====
Voiced by: Chafurin (Japanese); Ward Perry (English)

Hitoshi Demegawa (出目川 仁, Demegawa Hitoshi) is a publicity hound and director of Sakura TV (さくらTV). He initially appears when Misa Amane sends four videotapes to Sakura TV in order to gain attention from the real Kira, and approves of broadcasting the tapes on live TV. However, he is forced to hand the tapes over to Soichiro, who crashes a police wagon into the studio and threatens him at gunpoint. He later helps the investigation force to lure out Higuchi by running a television program. Demegawa reappears after L's death, serving as Kira's spokesman for a while and even creating new programs in "honor" of Kira. Demegawa also leads the raid on Near's headquarters with Kira's supporters, but like all the other rioters, is distracted by the money that Near throws down. Later, when he takes matters into his own hands and builds a chapel to greet Kira, asking for donations, which would give Kira a bad image, Mikami kills him for being greedy, and he is replaced by Takada.

=== Federal Bureau of Investigation ===
The Federal Bureau of Investigation agrees to assist L since some people believed that Kira killed some American criminals. After Kira kills 12 agents, the FBI withdraws its assistance.

==== Raye Penber ====
Voiced by: Hideo Ishikawa (Japanese); Michael Adamthwaite (English)

Raye Penber (レイ・ペンバー, Rei Penbā) is an American investigator from the FBI, sent to Japan with eleven other agents to aid in tracking down Kira early in the story. Described by How to Read It as a "talented" agent, Raye is assigned to investigate the Yagami family for any suspicious behavior; but he eventually stops suspecting Light after he appears to be one of the victims of a bus-jacking. However, Light staged the event to get Raye's name so he could kill him. He has a fiancée, retired FBI agent Naomi Misora, whom he tells not to involve herself in the investigation for her own safety. Light manages to track him down and use him "as a pawn" to kill the other eleven members of his team (he unknowingly used a page of Light's notebook to kill them). Light kills Raye soon after. Before Raye dies, he sees Light, realizing that he is indeed Kira.

He is known in the film series as Raye Iwamatsu (レイ・イワマツ, Rei Iwamatsu) and is portrayed by Shigeki Hosokawa.

Shogen portrays the version of Raye Penber in the TV drama.

Obata said that as Raye was of mixed American and Japanese descent, Obata "struggled over his design" and tried to make Penbar look more non-Japanese. Obata said that he wishes that he could have "drawn him a bit better." Hosokawa said that when he portrayed Raye he built Raye's strength, tenderness and the "feeling of mortification."

==== Naomi Misora ====
Voiced by: Naoko Matsui (Japanese); Tabitha St. Germain (English)

Naomi Misora (南空 ナオミ, Misora Naomi) is Raye Penber's fiancée. A former first rate FBI agent, Naomi left the Bureau in October 2003 (2006 in the anime) for the sake of starting a family in the United States. After the sudden death of her fiancé which she blames Kira for, Naomi decides to take part in the Kira case herself, and theorizes that Kira has other methods of killing besides heart attack. In her attempts to contact the Kira investigation team, she comes across Light Yagami. Cautious at first, she uses the false name Shoko Maki (間木 照子, Maki Shōko) in order to protect herself until she can reach L. However, Light manages to manipulate her into revealing her real name to him, resulting in her death by suicide. Her body is never found due to the specifications made by Light in the Death Note.

Naomi's character was originally intended to have a larger role in the storyline which included investigating possible suspects for the Kira Case and expanded interaction with her fiancé. However, once Raye's character was killed author Tsugumi Ohba believed that having Naomi search for Kira was a "natural and interesting development" in the story. Within the cast of characters at the time Sayu was the only notable female. In adding Naomi, Ohba could finally have the "cool" female character he had always wanted. He initially planned for Naomi to have a long involvement in the story but underestimated the character's deductive abilities. Because she was able to uncover crucial plot information "faster than... thought", Ohba decided to end her character early to avoid facing complications with the story development later on. He described the storyline issue of Naomi as the greatest difficulty that he created for himself since the beginning of the series.

According to artist Takeshi Obata, after hearing about the storyline he looked forward to drawing her character since it would be his first time designing one like Naomi. Using the color black to convey her mourning over her fiancé he gave Naomi a leather jacket then designed her face and hair to match her clothes. Because of this ordering Obata states that Naomi was essentially "born from her clothes".

Naomi is one of the central characters in the spin-off novel Death Note Another Note: The Los Angeles BB Murder Cases by author Nisio Isin. The story is set several years prior to the start of the series and focuses on a series of murder cases investigated by L with Naomi as his operative. The resulting capture of the murderer helped launch Naomi's reputation within the FBI.

She is also a key character in the 2006 film Death Note.

==== Steve Mason ====
Voiced by: Mitsuru Ogata (Japanese); John Novak (English)

Steve Mason (スティーブ・メイスン, Sutību Meisun; romanized as Steeve Maison in Japanese media) is the head of the Federal Bureau of Investigation. He assists L in investigating the Japanese police and withdraws FBI involvement after the FBI agents in Japan die. At a later point, he helps Near create the SPK. Mason dies due to the Death Note.

=== Yotsuba Group ===
The Yotsuba Group (ヨツバグループ, Yotsuba Gurūpu) is a group of eight members of the Yotsuba Corporation. On Light's instruction, Rem delivers the Death Note to one of them. They meet weekly to discuss the killing of key individuals from competing companies to maintain dominance in the business industry. While they realize that one of them is Kira, they do not know which one.

==== Kyosuke Higuchi ====
Voiced by: Issei Futamata (Japanese); Andrew Kavadas (English)

Kyosuke Higuchi (火口 卿介, Higuchi Kyōsuke) is the third "Kira", receiving the Death Note from Rem, who was instructed to give it to a "greedy, forceful, and selfish" individual who would use the Death Note to attain a higher status that was out of his reach. He was the head of Technology Development at the Yotsuba Corporation, and is part of the Yotsuba Group, eight members of the Yotsuba Corporation that use the Death Note to kill individuals from competing companies to dominate the business industry. Due to his brash attitude and ineptitude, the other members eventually figured out that he is Kira.

When he receives the Death Note, he is instructed by Rem to carry out routine killings of criminals, then do whatever he pleases with the Note outside of the killings. He then meets weekly with the rest of the Yotsuba Group to discuss the killing of key individuals from competing companies to maintain dominance in the business industry. While they realize that one of them is Kira, they initially do not know it is Higuchi. During L's probe on the group, Higuchi kills Hatori after Hatori produced a "careless outburst." Rem aids the capture of Higuchi by revealing his identity to Misa. Misa reveals her admiration of Kira and uses her status as the second Kira to get him to propose to her and admit to being Kira on tape.

He is then betrayed by his fellow Yotsuba Group members, which involves Matsuda appearing on Sakura TV to reveal that Higuchi is Kira. This leads to him acquiring the Shinigami Eyes, and he uses them to evade the police for a short time on his way to Sakura TV. He is eventually thwarted by a masked police blockade set up by L's task force. He attempts to kill himself to avoid capture, but Watari uses his expert marksmanship to shoot the gun out of his hand. He then reveals to everyone the existence of Death Notes. Light touches the Death Note while inspecting it, thereby regaining his memories of being the real Kira. Light then uses a Death Note scrap hidden in his watch to kill Higuchi.

==== Other members of the Yotsuba Group ====
Shingo Mido (三堂 芯吾, Midō Shingo)
Voiced by: Eiji Hanawa (Japanese); Trevor Devall (English)

Shingo Mido, the Vice President of Corporate Strategy and the Director of Financial Planning, feels reservations regarding the Yotsuba Kira and ponders leaving the other board members. Mido appears to have a sense of appreciation for Yotsuba. Misa Amane acknowledges that Mido bears a resemblance to Light Yagami.

Reiji Namikawa (奈南川 零司, Namikawa Reiji)
Voiced by: Hirofumi Nojima (Japanese); Ted Cole (English)

Reiji Namikawa is the Vice President of Sales, and the youngest member of the eight. He initially encourages the Yotsuba Kira. After receiving a telephone call from Light he ceases participation and observes the scenario. He is described as the most talented of the board members who has the potential to make it to the top without Kira, and that he detests useless subordinates. He has a talent in shogi at the professional 4-dan level.

Eiichi Takahashi (鷹橋 鋭一, Takahashi Eiichi)
Voiced by: Rintarō Nishi (Japanese); David Orth (English)

Eiichi Takahashi is the Vice President of Yotsuba Material Planning Division and Yotsuba Homes. Despite his position, he is stated to not have what it takes to be a true leader and that he was selected to attend the meetings to make Higuchi look good. The other members view Takahashi as foolish because he does not seem to put much thought into his comments.

Suguru Shimura (紙村 英, Shimura Suguru)
Voiced by: Hiroyuki Yokoo (Japanese); Brian Drummond (English)

Suguru Shimura is the Head of Personnel. He is described as paranoid and always keep a close eye on others. Shimura's ability to pay attention to small details allowed him to join the meetings; he noticed subtle changes in poker-faced Namikawa's face.

Masahiko Kida (樹多 正彦, Kida Masahiko)
Voiced by: Masaki Aizawa (Japanese); Martin Sims (English)

The Vice President of Rights and Planning, Masahiko Kida controls the finances of the committee and contacts "Eraldo Coil." Despite being calm and collected, he is not able to deal with surprises, leading him to panic when "Eraldo Coil" asks for more money.

Takeshi Ooi (尾々井 剛, Ooi Takeshi)
Voiced by: Kiyoyuki Yanada (Japanese); Michael Kopsa (English)

Takeshi Ooi is the Vice President of VT Enterprises. He is the eldest and most influential member and he appears to control the conferences. He individually contacts the members of the committee. He is described as a tough guy who doesn't sweat the details.

Arayoshi Hatori (葉鳥 新義, Hatori Arayoshi)
Voiced by: Yukitoshi Tokumoto (Japanese); Simon Hayama (English)

The Vice President of Marketing, Arayoshi Hatori is the illegitimate son of the company president and uses this fact to benefit himself. He has been shown to appear to be unable to handle the pressures of the meetings. After Hatori makes a careless outburst the Yotsuba Kira kills him.

After L dies, Light writes the names of the remaining six, killing them by way of a heart attack. Rumors of Kira's responsibility in the deaths causes Yotsuba's share prices to drop sharply. In the director's cut of Death Note, Mido dies by falling from a tall building, Shimura dies by being run over by a train, and Namikawa dies in a car accident.

=== SPK ===
The Special Provision for Kira, usually abbreviated "SPK", is a group of anti-Kira formed by members of Central Intelligence Agency and Federal Bureau of Investigation members headed by Near. Membership of the group remains small to preserve secrecy and the group decides to work separately from the Japanese task force. Many of the SPK are later killed with the Death Note by the mafia due to leaked information.

==== Anthony Rester ====
Voiced by: Masaki Aizawa (Japanese); Michael Adamthwaite (English)

Commander Anthony Rester (アンソニー・レスター, Ansonī Resutā), real name Anthony Carter (アンソニー・カーター, Ansonī Kātā), is the second-in-command and the lead crime scene investigator. Rester follows Near except in emergency situations. Near trusts Rester and sometimes reveals certain information solely to Rester. Rester's quiet personality and physical capabilities serve useful functions in the SPK, although he is far below Near in terms of intellectual prowess.

==== Halle Lidner ====
Voiced by: Akeno Watanabe (Japanese); Lisa Ann Beley (English)

Halle Lidner (ハル・リドナー, Haru Ridonā), real name Halle Bullook (ハル・ブロック, Haru Burokku), works for Near as part of his investigation team. Halle is a former CIA agent who leaks information to Mello in order to increase the chances of Kira being caught.

==== Stephen Gevanni ====
Voiced by: Hiroki Takahashi (Japanese); Sam Vincent (English)

Stephen Gevanni (ステファン・ジェバンニ, Sutefan Jebannī), real name is Stephen Loud (ステファン・ラウド, Sutefan Raudo), works for Near as part of his investigation team. Gevanni is assigned to follow Mikami for much of the case, and it is his meticulous analysis of Mikami's personal habits which allow him to find Mikami's Death Note and swap it with a fake. Gevanni skillfully follows and monitors suspects and has abilities such as the skill of picking locks.

=== Mafia ===
The Mafia, being used by Mello, increases its influence and intends to possess the Death Note and gain power. In the Death Note Rewrite 2 special, the mafia plot is omitted.

==== Rod Ross ====
Voiced by: Masaki Aizawa (Japanese); Brian Dobson (English)

Rod Ross (ロッド・ロス, Roddo Rosu; romanized Rodd Los in Japanese media), real name Dwhite Gordon (ドワイト・ゴードン, Dowaito Gōdon), is the head of the mafia. Ross follows Mello's orders. As his name is easily known, Light kills him. His name is also mentioned in L: Change the WorLd as the leader of an arms syndicate who deals with the mafia.

==== Jack Neylon ====
Voiced by: Takashi Matsuyama (Japanese); Ted Cole (English)

Jack Neylon (ジャック・ネイロン, Jakku Neiron), real name Kal Snydar (カル・スナイダー, Karu Sunaidā), is a member of Mello's gang. He is the holder of Sidoh's Death Note after it is given to the gang by the Kira investigation team. Before Mello joined, he was involved in drug trafficking and illegal weapons sales; neither charge stuck due to lack of evidence, despite four separate arrests. After Sidoh tracks down his Death Note, Jack was forced by Mello and Ross to perform the eye trade with the Shinigami. Light uses the Death Note to have him mail the address of Mello's hideout. Jack has been shown to harbor a strong dislike for Mello.

=== Shinigami ===
==== Rem ====
Voiced by: Kimiko Saitō (Japanese); Colleen Wheeler (English)

Rem (レム, Remu) is the Shinigami who gives Misa her Death Note. Like Ryuk, Rem possesses two Death Notes; however, Rem did not get hers through trickery. The Shinigami Gelus, who had fallen in love with Misa, intentionally killed someone who was going to murder Misa. Since he had knowingly used his Death Note to extend a human life (a violation of Shinigami law), he was reduced to ash, leaving only his Death Note. Touched by this act, Rem delivered Gelus's Death Note to Misa, since it was her life that he saved. Her appearance is quite skeletal, with long, spinal cord-like arms and bone-like skin.

While Ryuk takes amusement in everything in the human world, Rem is almost the exact opposite. She views most humans with contempt, seeing Shinigami as the more evolved race. Also, while Ryuk is ambivalent to Light's success or failure, Rem actively assists Misa, having inherited Gelus's love for her. She is even willing to sacrifice her life to defend Misa, as evidenced by her threat to kill Light should Misa die before her time. For Misa's sake, however, she still assists Light in his schemes, although she despises Kyosuke Higuchi, the human she gave the Death Note to and calls the Yotsuba Group "disgusting creatures" due to them using the Death Note for personal gain. Amusingly, Rem experiences difficulty while writing the Japanese language. Light manages to force Rem to work for him by presenting a situation in which harm would come to Misa otherwise. As such, she dies when she writes L's name.

==== Gelus ====
Voiced by: Kenichi Matsuyama (Japanese); Michael Dobson (English)

Gelus (ジェラス, Jerasu) appears in a flashback when Rem explains how to kill a Shinigami. He is a small, doll-like Shinigami who appears to be patched together out of mismatched fabric. He only has one eye, despite having two eye sockets. In the flashback, Rem recalls Gelus watching over a younger Misa Amane in the human world, which he spends most of his time doing. Knowing that it was Misa's final day, he watches with her, interested in how she will die. Having fallen in love with Misa, Gelus uses his Death Note to kill Misa's destined murderer, a crazed stalker, against Rem's protests. Gelus is reduced to a pile of "something that was not sand nor dust," as punishment for extending a human life, leaving behind only his Death Note. His remaining years are added to Misa's lifespan. Rem delivers his Death Note to Misa because it was she whom he saved. In the film, she simply drops it and it lands near Misa.

==== Sidoh ====
Voiced by: Kazuki Yao (Japanese); Sam Vincent (English)

Sidoh (シドウ, Shidō) is the Shinigami whose Death Note was stolen by Ryuk. By the time he realizes this, however, the note has already changed hands several times, ending up in the hands of Jack Neylon, a member of Mello's gang. After repeatedly hounding Ryuk for its return, he tracks down the gang to get it back. He discovers his notebook is in Los Angeles, California and upon arrival takes the notebook out of Mello's hands (making it look as if it just floated in mid-air) and touches it to the notebook's current owner, Kal Snyder (Jack Neylon's real name). After Snyder freaks out, he gets Mello and the others to touch the notebook. To regain his Note, Sidoh agrees to help Mello's gang against Near's SPK and the Kira investigation team. Snyder is forced to make the eye trade with Sidoh, who exposes the fake 13-day rule.

Sidoh wears heavy clothing, obscuring most of his features, and his head is wrapped in bandages. He shares Mello's great liking for chocolate, similar to Ryuk's liking of apples. Sidoh is fairly timid; Mello frightens Sidoh, despite the fact that Mello is a human. Sidoh is shown to be unintelligent and forgetful, rarely remembering the names of other Shinigami.^{[11]} After Light regains the Death Note from Mello, he returns it to Sidoh to keep him from interfering.

==== Armonia Justin Beyondormason ====
Voiced by: Hideyuki Umezu (Japanese); Michael Dobson (English)

Armonia Justin Beyondormason (アラモニア = ジャスティン = ビヨンドルメーソン, Aramonia-Jasutin-Biyondorumēson), is a briefly featured Shinigami who informs Sidoh that his Death Note was stolen by the Shinigami Ryuk and gives him the rules for different situations. As his names suggests, Justin's appearance is that of a skeleton adorned with all manner of jewellery. Justin is the right-hand man of the Shinigami King and sits on a throne. Highly intelligent, Justin knows everything there is to know about the Death Note, and Shinigami often go to him in trouble.^{[13]} Justin provides Sidoh with several scrolls describing the various rules that Shinigami have for interacting with humans, which Sidoh uses to guide his interactions with Mello in the human world. The scrolls are not mentioned in the anime.

==== Midora ====
Midora (ミードラ, Mīdora) is a large, salamander-like Shinigami with stubby limbs. Unlike most Shinigami, she does not wear any clothing or accessories. She enjoys moist weather but loathes dry seasons. Her enormous size gives her a dominating presence.^{[13]} While Midora is a background character in the main series, The C-Kira Story focuses on her. In the chapter, Ryuk's actions have made apples a commodity among the Shinigami. Midora uses this to bribe the Shinigami King into giving her a second Death Note, which she gives to a human in an attempt to replicate Ryuk's experience with Light. When this Kira is brushed off by Near as "cheap" and kills themselves as a result, Midora tells Ryuk about this, and he relates Light's claim that someone must have great spiritual strength and conviction to use the Death Note; Midora simply picked a "weakling". She admits that Ryuk is better at judging such things, then gives the extra Death Note to him. Midora also has a liking for bananas, similar to Ryuk's fondness for apples.^{[18]}

==== Shinigami King ====
The Shinigami King (死神大王, Shinigami Daiō), also known as the King of Death, is the ruler of the Shinigami. An unseen character in the main series, the Shinigami King governs the Shinigami and controls distribution of the Death Notes. It is not made clear if he creates them or just has a certain supply, as he is unwilling to replace lost ones. He appears to at least write the rules for the Death Notes, but whether or not he enforces them himself is unclear. The Shinigami King is regarded as a sort of father figure by lesser Shinigami, and is said to be almost immortal. Physically, the King is a large mass suspended in the air with chains. He has a skull for a head, which is surrounded by a larger, skull-like formation. He has four tentacle-like arms, each with only three fingers on the hands, which hang from his body.^{[21]}

One of the eyecatch rules given in the series states that extra Death Notes found by Shinigami are generally expected to be returned to the King, though Shinigami are not obliged to do this immediately. Likewise, lost notebooks must also be reported to him.^{[22]} Little information is given about the character himself, aside from Rem's assertion that the King is not easy to trick, which Ryuk successfully did. In contrast, he is quite easily bribed, as Midora was able to trade thirteen apples for a second Death Note after getting them from the human world.^{[21]}

=== Sachiko Yagami ===
Voiced by: Ai Satō (Japanese); Saffron Henderson (English)

Sachiko Yagami is the wife of Soichiro Yagami and the mother of Light. Like her daughter Sayu, she is unaware of Light ever being Kira even after his death.

=== Sayu Yagami ===
Voiced by: Haruka Kudō (Japanese); Kelly Metzger, Kristie Marsden (English)

Sayu Yagami (夜神 粧裕, Yagami Sayu) is Light's kindhearted younger sister. Like her mother she never learns of Light's possession of the Death Note or his identity as Kira. In the manga and anime, after Takimura's death, Mello's gang kidnaps her in exchange for the Death Note possessed by the investigation team. Although being returned unharmed, Sayu falls into a state of shock, eventually becoming unresponsive to the presence of others.

=== David Hoope ===
David Hoope (デイビット・ホープ, Deibitto Hōpu) is the President of the United States of America in the storyline. He assists in the formation of Near's SPK, and provides information and funding to Mello under threats of the Death Note. He turns to Light, despite knowing that he is not the real L, who manipulates him into providing assistance and attacking Mello's hideout. When the attack fails, President Hoope commits suicide to prevent Mello from writing his name and making him launch a nuclear strike. In the second Rewrite special, the mafia plot is omitted, with Light instead blackmailing him to leak information about the SPK. Light in turn forwards this information to Takada and Mikami, and they kill the SPK. In the anime, the character was merged with that of George Sairas.

=== George Sairas ===
Voiced by: Aruno Tahara (Japanese); Michael Dobson (English)

George Sairas (ジョージ・サイラス, Jōji Sairasu; George Psyeruth in Japanese media) is the Vice President of the United States. When Hoope dies, Sairas succeeds him to be the President. He capitulates to Kira and officially announces support for him. In addition, Sairas leaks secret information about the SPK to Kira (due to the latter's blackmail on him). Sairas is described as weak-willed and lacking as a leader. In the anime, Sairas is US president before SPK's establishment.

=== Koreyoshi Kitamura ===
Voiced by: Masaru Ikeda (Japanese); Howard Siegal (English)

Koreyoshi Kitamura (北村 是良, Kitamura Koreyoshi) is the deputy director of the NPA and Soichiro's superior. He feels weighted by Yotsuba's pressure.

=== Kanichi Takimura ===
Kanichi Takimura is the head director of the NPA. He is kidnapped by Mello in order to be used as a hostage in exchange for the Death Note. He is later controlled to commit suicide by Light Yagami.

=== Yamamoto ===
Yamamoto (山本, Yamamoto) is the newest member of the NPA who only appears in the final chapter. He works as Matsuda's junior, and was seen troubled by Matsuda bothering him with going to a bar. In the special one-shot chapter set three years later, he can be seen in the same room with the rest of the team, albeit not belonging to them, as noted by Matsuda.

=== Criminals and initial victims ===
==== Kurou Otoharada ====
An unemployed 42-year-old man, Kurou Otoharada (音原田 九郎, Otoharada Kurō) is the first criminal that Light kills. Otoharada's name is announced on television as he holds eight hostages in a nursery school. As this incident was reported only on local television, it helped L narrow down Kira's whereabouts.

==== Takuo Shibuimaru ====
Voiced by: Tomohiro Nishimura (Japanese); Lee Tockar (English)

Takuo Shibuimaru (渋井丸 拓男, Shibuimaru Takuo), nicknamed "Shibutaku" (シブタク; "Cool Taku"), is the second person that Light kills. Shibuimaru rides a motorcycle and travels with a group of bikers. After Light sees him harassing and chasing a woman (in the anime, he was about to rape the woman), Light writes his name down with a death by traffic accident. A truck slams into Shibuimaru's motorcycle, killing him. It was this death that fully convinces Light that the Death Note does work. In the manga Light feels some guilt since Shibuimaru is not a criminal.

==== Lind L. Tailor ====
Voiced by: Yukitoshi Tokumoto (Japanese); John Murphy, Matt Lagan (English)

Lind L. Tailor (リンド・L・テイラー, Rindo Eru Teirā) is a convicted criminal waiting on death row for an unspecified capital offence; this information was kept secretly away from the public. L places Tailor as his decoy on television in exchange for being pardoned by the government. The television states that the broadcast is worldwide and that Tailor's statements are being translated into Japanese. After Tailor states that he is "L", he reads a declaration stating that Kira is evil. Light, in a rage, kills Tailor with a heart attack. The real L announces that Tailor was a decoy, a criminal on death row, and discovers that Kira cannot kill the real L without having seen his face, and that Kira is in Kanto, as that was the only area that the appearance was actually broadcast in.

==== Kiichiro Osoreda ====
Voiced by: Katsuhisa Hōki (Japanese); Brian Dobson (English)

Kiichiro Osoreda (恐田 奇一郎, Osoreda Kiichirō) is a drug addict and criminal used by Light to trick Raye into revealing his FBI badge to Light. Osoreda had failed in an attempt to rob a bank, shooting a teller and two customers as he escaped. Light writes Osoreda's name in the Death Note, dictating his actions. Osoreda boards a bus and holds a gun to the driver's head. Osoreda threatens Light as he unwittingly picks up a piece of the Death Note. Due to this, Ryuk appears solely to Osoreda, frightening the criminal. Osoreda empties his ammunition into Ryuk, who does not die. Osoreda forces the driver to stop the bus and then runs into the street, where an automobile hits Osoreda's head, killing him; the authorities mistakenly believe that Osoreda's vision of Ryuk was a drug-induced hallucination.

== Film-only characters ==
=== Sanami ===
Sanami (佐波) is a character exclusive to the Death Note film series. She is a member of the Task Force. She is portrayed by Miyuki Komatsu. She is the only female member of the Task Force, which differs from the all-male team in the manga and anime. In Death Note: The Last Name, she tends to Misa Amane during her captivity and is more critical of the methods used by the investigation team, often calling them cruel.

In the Matsuda spinoff short film, Sanami tries to help Touta Matsuda and passes him a note from Soichiro Yagami. The note tells Matsuda to visit Ryuzaki to help Matsuda find closure with the case.

=== Ryotaro Sakajo ===
Ryotaro Sakajo (坂城 良太郎, Sakajō Ryōtarō) is a character exclusive to the Death Note film series. He is the assistant director during the filming of Misa Amane's "Misa-Misa's Happy Sweets" video. He is obsessed with Misa, collecting a used tissue of hers after she throws it in the trash. In a sequence bridged between the two films, Sakajo corners Misa and brandishes a knife, stating that he wishes to die with her. Gelus, a shinigami watching from the Shinigami realm, kills him to save Misa's life. In doing so, Gelus dies and Rem, who was watching, finds it only fitting to grant possession of his notebook to the human that he loved. Since Rem was the first Shinigami to touch the dead Gelus's notebook, she gained possession of that one.

=== Shiori Akino ===
Shiori Akino (秋野 詩織, Akino Shiori) is portrayed by Yuu Kashii. She is Light's girlfriend, classmate at To-Oh University (東応大学, Tōō Daigaku), and childhood friend. Shiori dreams of working in law enforcement and feels some envy stemming from Light's abilities. Shiori disagrees with Kira's methods, stating that she does not like the terror they incite; she believes that the law should judge criminals. Shiori argues with the "pro-Kira" Light, unaware of the fact that Light is Kira. Light writes Shiori's name and the name of Naomi Misora in the Death Note, arranging the scenario to make it look like Naomi killed Shiori in a botched kidnapping scenario trying to expose Kira.

Shusuke Kaneko, director of the film, said that he created Shiori after reading the original Death Note manga. In an interview printed in Weekly Shonen Jump, the creators of the film stated that Shiori was added to the story to highlight Light's negative aspects. Kaneko said that he needed Shiori to "deliver Light's badness to the audience."

In the production notes Kashii said that she felt excited to portray Shiori and wondered if the audience could accept her character. Kitty Sensei of OtakuZone had her opinions of the film portrayal of Shiori published in The Star, a Malaysian newspaper. In it Kitty Sensei said that she felt concern about what the addition of Shiori "would affect our dear, megalomaniac Light. Will he be a softer version of the Light from the manga?" Kitty Sensei said that after watching the film she felt that Shiori "only strengthens the portrayal of Light" and that she "provides one of the gasp-worthy moments of the movie."

=== L: Change the World ===
==== Maki Nikaido ====
Portrayed by: Mayuko Fukuda

Maki Nikaido (二階堂 真希, Nikaido Maki) is a 10-year-old schoolgirl and the daughter of Dr Kimihiko Nikaido. Her mother was presumably deceased prior to the events of the film. She shared a close bond with her father's assistant Dr Kimiko Kujo (also known as K) before the murder of her father. Maki appeared as a pretty girl with chin-length black hair with her bangs covering her eyebrows, and wherever she goes, she was always seen carrying a teddy bear that contains a recording of her mother's voice. She was also shown to be sensible, calm and kind and caring towards her kin, though she can be quite ruthless towards those whom she hated (notably Kujo for killing her father).

After witnessing her father's death at the hands of Kujo, who was in fact, the leader of the bioterrorist group who created the virus that destroyed a Thai village, Maki fled the laboratory with the virus sample and antidote formula her father inexplicitly entrusted to her to pass to Watari, and eventually she reached L's headquarters and sought refuge from him. Soon after, Kujo and her associates reached L's headquarters, having traced Maki's whereabouts and there, Maki faces them alone in a corridor. Filled with hatred towards Kujo for causing her father's death, Maki injected herself with the virus and was about to kill Kujo (and herself was going to get shot too) when L rescued her, taking her and Near out of the headquarters and managed to flee from the terrorists with the help of FBI agent Hideaki Sugura. Somehow, Maki did not show any symptoms even after she had injected herself with the virus; this led to the terrorists to speculate that Maki may have the antidote injected inside her (later on, when L met Dr Nikaido's lab partner Koichi Matsudo, Matsudo tested Maki and reasoned that Maki's apparent immunity to the virus was due to her low blood sugar, and this made the virus to not have sufficient energy from infecting her).

While they were travelling on the train to locate Dr Nikaido's lab partner, a television broadcast by Kujo (as part of her strategy to capture Maki) announced to the public that Maki was a patient infected with a lethal virus who escaped the hospital and her photo of herself in her school attire was presented on-screen. This led to widespread panic, especially to some train passengers who recognized Maki from her face and school uniform shown on the news. As such, L had Maki changed into a red dress (to prevent anyone from recognizing her) and they both, together with Near, had to stop using public transport to travel and used bicycles instead. During the time Maki spent with L and Near, while she bonded with both L and Near, she seemingly developed some signs of romantic feelings for the eccentric detective. Despite this possible affection, L generally views Maki as a younger sister and treats her like one.

After they met Dr Nikaido's lab partner Matsudo and ask for his help to create the antidote, Matsudo, who was initially reluctant due to a past incident of an accidental death as a result of his creations, finally relented and agreed to do the job after hearing L's persuasion. After several failed attempts, with the help of Near, the antidote was made. But by then, Maki sneaked off, intending to murder Kujo but was captured instead before L, having discovered her disappearance, could arrive on time to save her. L could only find her bag and teddy bear left abandoned at the harbor where Maki told Kujo to come meet her before her capture.

Maki was later brought onto a plane bound for the United States, where the terrorists intend to use the virus in her to cause infection on the plane and spread it in the US (in turn, the whole world). With the timely intervention from L, the antidote is administered to Maki and the infected passengers, as well as the surviving infected terrorists (including Kujo herself), thereby stopped the crisis. After being injected with the antidote, Maki saw an unconscious Kujo and once again attempting to murder Kujo, but stopped after L persuaded her from doing so. As she did so, Maki began to cry as L approached to console and hug her. Soon, the police arrived to arrest Kujo and her surviving associates.

Later on, together with the infected passengers, Maki was brought to hospital. It was the last time Maki would see L again before his death. Before the end of the movie, a fully-cured Maki awaken to find her teddy bear, with a new recording from L telling Maki to have a good day tomorrow. After hearing it, Maki looked up sideways at nowhere, saying L's name, presumably wondering where he is currently.

==== Kimiko Kujo ====
Portrayed by: Youki Kudoh

The main antagonist of the film L: Change the World, Dr. Kimiko Kujo (久條 希実子, Kujo Kimiko) is a scientist who leads a bioterrorist group that strives to use a virus to wipe out most of the mankind to create a new world, believing that the world is corrupt due to humanity's countless acts of undoing. Going by the alias K, Kujo was a former student of Watari, and was known to L. It is mentioned by L that Watari used to be proud of her, possibly due to her intelligence and academic achievements, for which this also implied that her extreme methods and disregard for humanity had led to Watari putting a possible end to their relationship, as hinted by some parts of the movie. In the movie, prior to the murder of Dr Nikaido, Kujo had a close relationship with Maki, Dr Nikaido's daughter.

Kujo, having collaborated with corrupt businessman Daisuke Matoba, initiates her group to infiltrate the facility she works in, and in the process, she allows her accomplices to kill all her colleagues in the facility before surrounding Dr Nikaido, with an attempt to force him to hand over the antidote, which Nikaido made to cure the virus; that virus is the same virus Kujo had earlier used to destroy a Thai village in the beginning of the film. Nikaido destroys the antidote instead of handing it to Kujo, claiming that he also destroyed the antidote formula beforehand, before proceeding to inject himself with the virus. Seeing Dr Nikaido succumbing to the virus, Kujo incinerates the laboratory which Nikaido was in, leaving him to die in the room. Unbeknownst to her, Maki had witnessed her murdering Nikaido, which gives birth to hatred in the heart of the 10-year-old, who quickly escapes the facility with grief for her father's death.

After correctly deducing that Maki could have the antidote formula and sought refuge from Watari, K contacts L, pretending to ask L to meet her the next day afternoon regarding the virus (she lies to L that her laboratory received the virus from the Thai village and is seeking his help). Afterwards, she and her terrorist group goes to L's location with attempt to capture Maki for the antidote formula. Filled with hatred towards Kujo for causing her father's death, Maki injects herself with the virus and is about to kill Kujo (and herself is going to get shot too) when L rescues her, taking her and Near out of the headquarters, and manages to flee from the terrorists with the help of FBI agent Hideaki Sugura. Somehow, Maki does not show any symptoms even after she had injected herself with the virus; this leads to the terrorists to speculate that Maki may have the antidote injected inside her.

As part of her next strategy to catch Maki, a television broadcast by Kujo announces to the public that Maki is a patient infected with a lethal virus who escaped the hospital and her photo of herself in her school attire is presented on-screen. Widespread panic ensues and many ambulances and police cars are set on patrol to look out for any signs of Maki. Meanwhile, after arriving at Dr Nikaido's lab partner's house to seek help to create the antidote, Maki sneaks off without L and the others noticing. Maki then contacts Kujo to meet her alone at the harbour where she plans to murder Kujo to avenge her father's death. However, Kujo and her associates manage to capture Maki upon reaching the harbour.

Maki is later brought onto a plane bound for the United States, where Kujo and the terrorists intend to use the virus in her to cause infection on the plane and spread it in the US (in turn, the whole world). With the timely intervention from L, the antidote is administered to Maki and the infected passengers, as well as the surviving infected terrorists (including Kujo herself), thereby stopping the crisis. Kujo refused to relent to L when confronted with the antidote, claiming that humanity should be destroyed, and that L is too late to stop it. L, in turn, states that Kujo is wrong and asks her if the destruction is what Watari would have wanted (implying it would not). After stating that he created a device that would make the plane crash into the sea and the virus would become harmless, which effectively makes it useless for Kujo to initiate the plan, L convinces her that humanity is still good at nature and would learn from their mistakes before injecting her with the antidote, choosing not to leave her to succumb to the infection with intent to let her pay for what she did by the law. L even convinces Maki to not be overcome by revenge before she can successfully murder Kujo.

After the police arrive, Kujo and her surviving associates are arrested.

=== Death Note: Light Up the New World ===
==== Tsukuru Mishima ====
Portrayed by: Masahiro Higashide

Tsukuru Mishima (三島 創, Mishima Tsukuru) is recruited by Soichiro Yagami to serve as leader of the Death Note task force that is created in response to a surge of killings by new Death Note users. In 2015, Mishima kills Mikami in order to claim the notebook Light entrusted to his son. From then on, Mishima acts as the new Kira, intending to surpass Light and establish world peace. In order to hide his identity, he passes the notebook to cyber-terrorist Yuki Shien and loses his memories of being Kira. When Mishima meets Shien in 2016, he touches the notebook he gave to Shien and regains his memories. After being imprisoned for his crimes, Mishima is freed from confinement by a dying Ryuzaki, who appoints a remorseful Mishima as his successor. His real name is Ryo Nakagami (中上 亮, Nakagami Ryō).

==== Ryuzaki ====
Portrayed by: Sosuke Ikematsu

Ryuzaki (竜崎, Ryūzaki) is a biological clone of L and serves as his successor after his death. He serves as a private investigator and assists in the Death Note investigation on the new Death Note users. Ryuzaki is handed a notebook by the shinigami Arma, but refuses to use the notebook in honor of L. Before passing his notebook to Shien, Mishima writes Ryuzaki's name into the Death Note and sets the time of death several days in advance. After being exposed as the new Kira, Ryuzaki pardons Mishima and appoints him as his successor before his death. Ryuzaki's birthname was Masayuki Arai (新井正幸, Arai Masayuki)

==== Yuki Shien ====
Portrayed by: Masaki Suda

Yuki Shien (紫苑 優輝, Shien Yūki) is an expert hacker who begins to worship Kira after Light kills the murderer of Shien's parents. He receives Mishima's notebook from the shinigami Ryuk and begins a crusade to collect all 6 Death Notes that have been dropped all over the world by other shinigami. Shien attempts to kill both Mishima and Ryuzaki when the three men all meet in an abandoned building, but police officers ambush the building and shoot Shien to death.

==== Arma ====
Voiced by: Miyuki Sawashiro

Arma (アーマ, Āma) is a white female shinigami who becomes romantically involved with Ryuzaki after he finds her notebook. When Ryuzaki and Mishima are ambushed by police, Arma sacrifices herself to save their lives. She was designed based on the shinigami Sidoh.

==== Beppo ====
Voiced by: Tori Matsuzaka

Beppo (ベポ, Bepo) is a gold-colored shinigami whose notebook is found by serial killer Sakura Aoi. Aoi is killed by Shien, leading the notebook to fall into the hands of Mishima's Death Note task force.

=== Death Note (American film) ===
==== Antony Skomal ====
Portrayed by: Artin John

Antony Skomal is the criminal who murdered Light's mother. He is a felon who managed to be acquitted of all his crimes (including the one of Light's mother murder) using his wealth and power, Skomal's multiple crimes without conviction lead to the media nicknaming him "the Teflon Criminal". When Light discovers the Death Note, feeling enraged by the lack of punishment for his mother's murderer, he kills Skomal by making him impale himself on a steak knife during a dinner out.

==== Kenny Doyle ====
Portrayed by: Jack Ettlinger

Kenny Doyle is a bully from Light's high school and his first victim. When Ryuk first appears to Light, Kenny and his friend are roughing up another student outside the classroom. Ryuk convinces Light to take action by writing down Doyle's name and his manner of death. Light specifies "decapitation", and a series of events lead to a truck swerving in the road, causing a ladder to slide off the truck and striking Doyle's head with enough force to sever it from his body.

==== Mia Sutton ====
Portrayed by: Margaret Qualley

Mia Sutton is Light's classmate and girlfriend, who assists him in his worldwide massacre of criminals as the god-like vigilante: Kira, eventually seeking to kill those who seek to stop them and becoming dangerously obsessed with the book's power, secretly working with Ryuk to supplant Light as the primary Kira. In an interview with io9, director Adam Wingard revealed that rather than being an adaptation of the manga character Misa Amane as originally reported, Sutton was in-fact based on the sociopathic qualities of Light Yagami, with Light Turner having been based on the sympathetic amnesiac Light.
