= Charley and Vlas Parlapanides =

American film producers and screenwriters

Charley Parlapanides
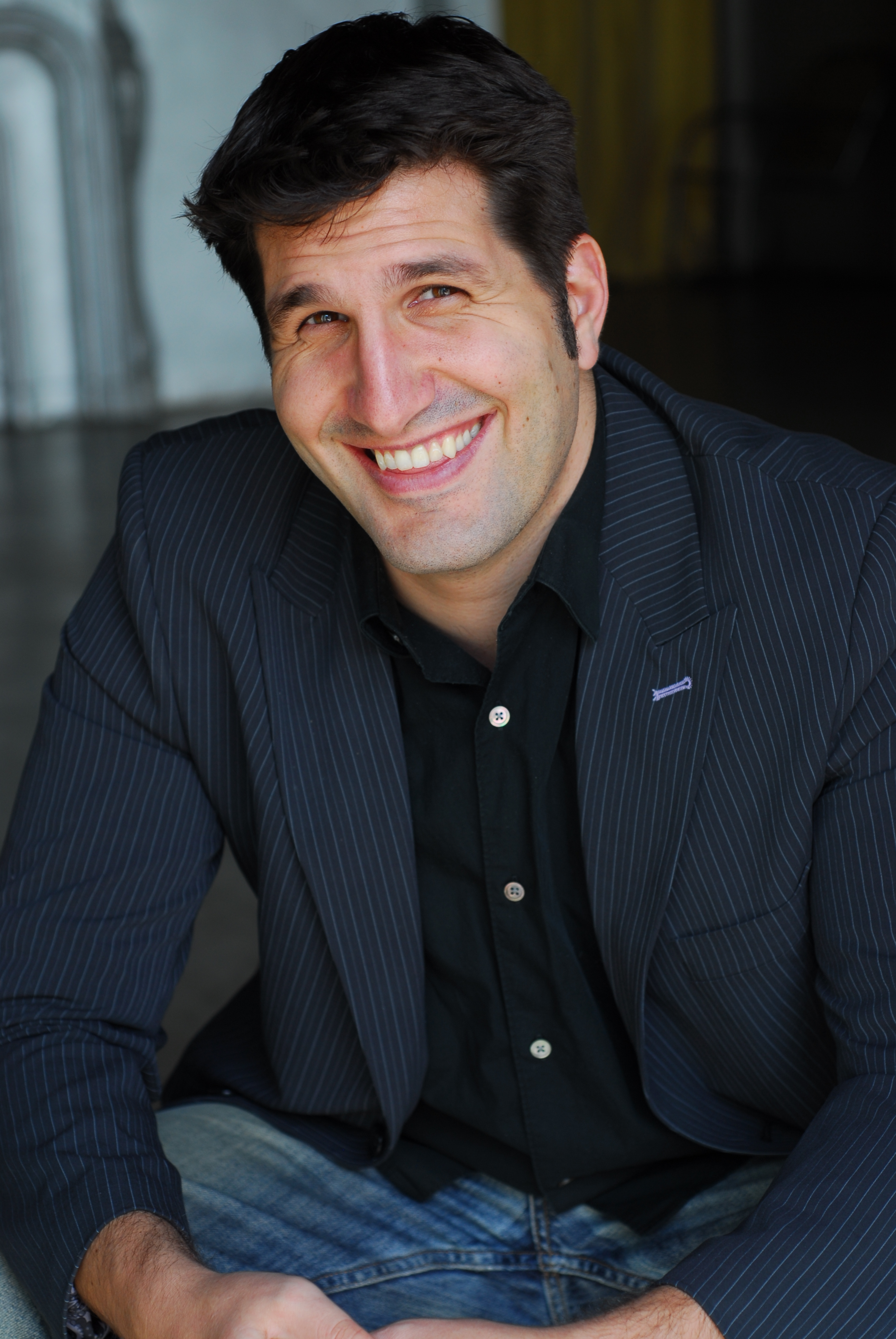
- Education: Swarthmore College; Loyola Law School
- Occupations: Creator, screenwriter, executive producer
- Employer(s): Netflix; Relativity Media; Warner Bros. Pictures; Universal Pictures; Paramount Pictures; Columbia Pictures
- Known for: Blood of Zeus; Immortals (2011 film); Death Note (2017 film); Everything For A Reason
- Website: Official website

Vlas Parlapanides
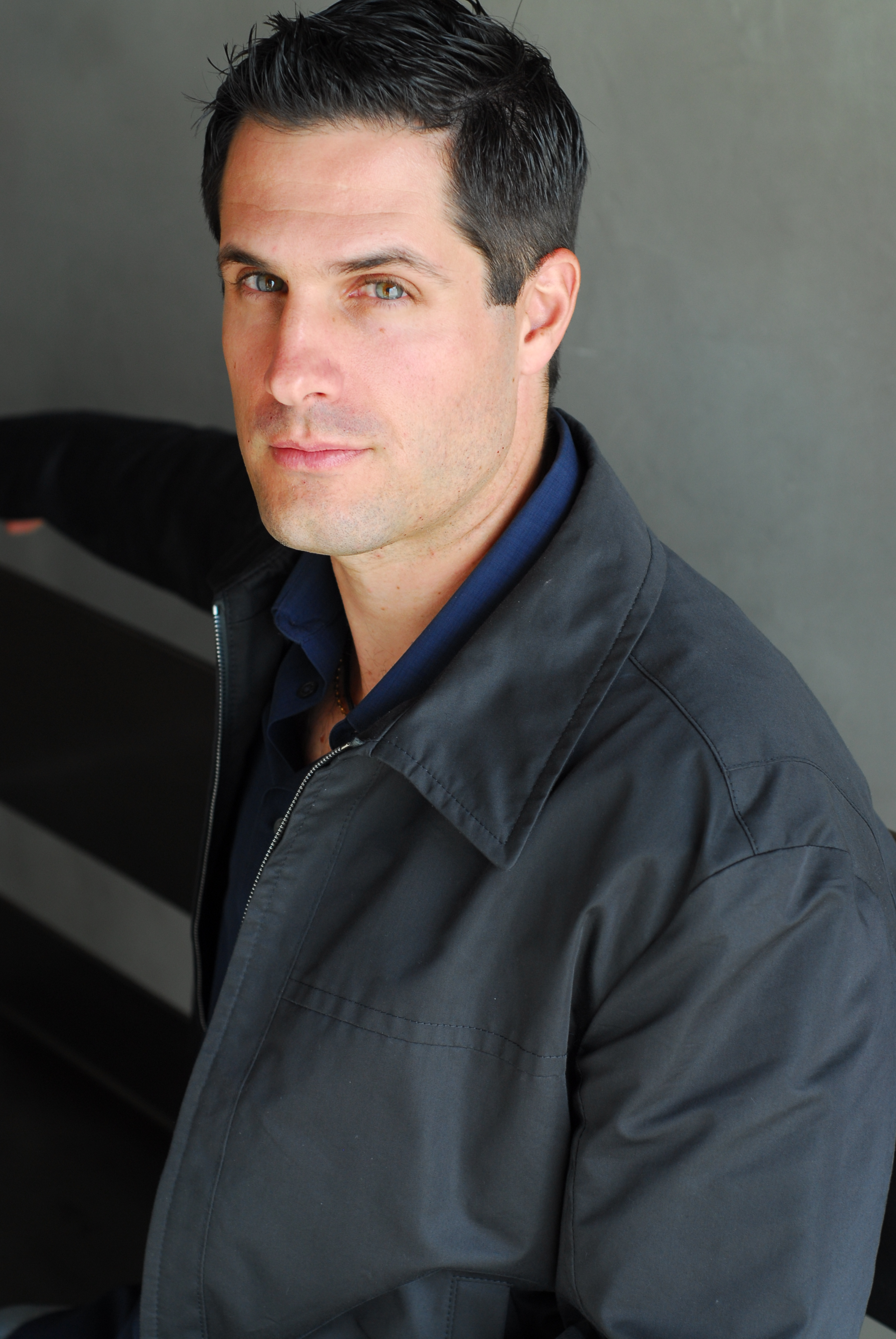
- Education: Villanova University
- Occupations: Creator, screenwriter, executive producer
- Employer(s): Netflix; Relativity Media; Warner Bros. Pictures; Universal Pictures; Paramount Pictures; Columbia Pictures
- Known for: Blood of Zeus; Immortals (2011 film); Death Note (2017 film); Everything For A Reason
- Website: Official website

Charley Kiriakos Parlapanides and Vlas Parlapanides are American screenwriters, producers, and directors. They are best known as the creators, writers, and executive producers of the Netflix animated series Blood of Zeus (2020–2025), which ran for three seasons, and earned them a Writers Guild of America Awards nomination. The duo also wrote the fantasy action film Immortals (2011) and co-wrote the supernatural thriller Death Note (2017).

== Early life and education ==
Charley and Vlas Parlapanides were raised in Seaside Park, New Jersey, in a Greek-American family. Their parents, Vlas Sr. and Angeliki Parlapanides, are of Greek descent. Growing up, the brothers spent summers in Greece and participated in Greek school and Greek folk dancing.

Vlas Parlapanides attended Villanova University, where he earned his undergraduate degree while Charley earned a degree in economics from Swarthmore College. While at Swarthmore, Charley played four seasons as a defensive lineman on the college’s football team. He later received a law degree from Loyola Law School.

== Career ==
=== Feature Work ===
Charley and Vlas Parlapanides began their professional careers as screenwriters before transitioning into producing and directing. In 2000 they developed their first independent feature film, Everything For A Reason, which premiered at the AFI International Film Festival. Vlas Parlapanides served as writer and director, while Charley Parlapanides produced the project. The brothers also appeared in minor acting roles.

Their Greek background has influenced a number of their creative works, particularly those centered on Greek mythology. In 2008, the brothers were announced as the screenwriters of War of Gods, a Greek mythology-based action film to be directed by Tarsem Singh. Relativity Media acquired the project to finance, develop and produce, with Gianni Nunnari, Mark Canton and Ryan Kavanaugh attached as producers. Contemporary reports noted that the production would employ visual-effects techniques similar to those used in 300.

The project was subsequently retitled Immortals. Directed by Singh and starring Henry Cavill, Mickey Rourke, and Freida Pinto, the film drew on elements of Greek mythology. It was released in 2011 by Relativity Media and grossed approximately $226.9 million worldwide against a reported $75 million budget. Immortals also received three nominations at the 38th Saturn Awards, including Best Fantasy Film.

In 2006, Charley and Vlas Parlapanides sold their spec screenplay Live Bet to Universal Pictures, with Curtis "50 Cent" Jackson attached to star. The project was described as a character-driven heist film set in the world of underground clubs in Manhattan, where wagers are placed on illegal car racing. Mary Parent and Scott Stuber were attached to produce, alongside Chris Lighty and Jackson through G-Unit Films.

In 2008, Charley and Vlas Parlapanides were hired by Vertigo Entertainment to write an early screenplay for an American adaptation of Death Note, the Japanese manga series written by Tsugumi Ohba and illustrated by Takeshi Obata. The project subsequently went through several writers, with Jeremy Slater writing a later draft that substantially shaped the finished film. Despite the subsequent rewrites, the Parlapanides brothers retained first-position screenplay credit, as determined by the Writers Guild of America. The completed film, Death Note, was released by Netflix in 2017, with Charley and Vlas Parlapanides and Slater receiving screenplay credit. The film starred Nat Wolff, Margaret Qualley, LaKeith Stanfield, and Willem Dafoe.

In 2009, Charley and Vlas Parlapanides were hired to write The Destroyer, a feature adaptation of the long-running novel series by Warren Murphy and Richard Sapir. The project was set up at Columbia Pictures, with Charles Roven and Steve Chasman producing.

In 2010, their spec script Hell to Pay was included on the Hit List, an annual survey of the most buzzworthy spec screenplays. The list highlights original scripts that have gained significant attention within the film industry and is compiled from votes by development executives, producers, agents, managers, and assistants. That same year, Mandate Pictures acquired Hell to Pay.

In 2015, Charley and Vlas Parlapanides were hired to write a sequel to Immortals for Relativity Media. Development of the sequel was subsequently disrupted amid Relativity's financial collapse, with the studio filing for Chapter 11 bankruptcy in July 2015. Although Relativity later announced plans to revive Immortals 2, the film was never produced.

In 2015, Charley and Vlas Parlapanides, along with Scott Charnick, sold their spec screenplay Zero Footprint to Alcon Entertainment. The project, inspired by the events surrounding the 2012 Benghazi attack, was written in consultation with a former Special Forces operator and focused on the covert operations and events leading up to the attack.

In 2015, Vlas Parlapanides, Charley Parlapanides and Scott Charnick were also hired to write an untitled military special-operations thriller for Warner Bros. Pictures. Robert Lorenz was attached to direct and produce the project alongside American Sniper collaborators Jason Hall and Peter Morgan.

In 2018, Vlas and Charley Parlapanides were hired to co-write an independent biographical film about psychiatrist Elisabeth Kübler-Ross with actress Melina Kanakaredes. The project, inspired by Kübler-Ross's memoir The Wheel of Life: A Memoir of Living and Dying, was to be produced by Kanakaredes through Melpa Productions alongside Das Films.

In September 2026, Netflix acquired Scope, a mystery action thriller written by Charley and Vlas Parlapanides and Scott Charnick. The film is set to be directed by Warfare director Ray Mendoza, with Jaume Collet-Serra and Max Jacoby producing through Jadis Collective.

Beyond their produced work and publicly announced projects, the Parlapanides brothers have continued to develop a broader slate of film and television projects across multiple genres. Their IMDb profiles also list additional projects in development. In a 2025 interview following the conclusion of Blood of Zeus, the brothers said their ongoing slate included a separate Medusa project, additional projects based on mythology, as well as live-action action, thriller and horror projects.

=== Television ===
In 2007, Charley and Vlas Parlapanides sold the television project Undercover to Paramount Television for development at The CW. Produced through Lynda Obst and Marc Rosen's Rosen-Obst Productions, the project was described as an updated take on 21 Jump Street, with the Parlapanides serving as writers and executive producers and John Stockwell attached to direct. Development coincided with the 2007–08 Writers Guild of America strike, after which the series did not move forward.

In 2012, Charley and Vlas Parlapanides created and were hired to write The Centurion, a high-concept drama developed for CBS. The project centered on a Force Recon Marine who returns to his former career as a police detective after making a promise to God while serving overseas; the brothers were also set to executive produce alongside Bob Sertner and Chris Morgan.

In 2014, A&E announced development of The 36, a supernatural drama centered on a modern conflict involving biblical fallen angels, with the Parlapanides brothers attached as writers (and executive producers) alongside producer Michael London.

In 2015, Charley and Vlas Parlapanides teamed with CSI: NY star Melina Kanakaredes to develop the television drama Stolen For Good for Dynamic Television. Kanakaredes was attached to star and co-write the series with the Parlapanides brothers, with Saving Grace creator Nancy Miller serving as executive producer and showrunner.

In March 2019, Netflix announced Gods & Heroes, an original anime series created and written by Charley and Vlas Parlapanides, who also served as executive producers. The Greek mythology-based series was produced by Powerhouse Animation Studios, with Brad Graeber also attached to the project.

In 2020, Gods & Heroes was renamed Blood of Zeus and released on Netflix. The series centers on Heron, a demigod and son of Zeus, and incorporates elements of Greek mythology. It was praised for its narrative, animation style, mythological themes, and its layered and well-developed characters. Blood of Zeus ran for three seasons from 2020 to 2025, with its third and final season released on Netflix in May 2025. Following its debut, the series reached Netflix's Top 10 in 60 countries. The brothers served as creators, writers, and executive producers of all three seasons of the series, writing all 24 episodes.

In 2025, Charley and Vlas Parlapanides received a Writers Guild of America Award nomination for Outstanding Writing in an Animated Program for the "Winter Is Born" episode of Blood of Zeus. All three seasons of Blood of Zeus received 100% approval ratings on the review aggregator Rotten Tomatoes.

=== Comics ===
In 2022, Charley and Vlas Parlapanides partnered with Academy Award-nominated screenwriter Dan Gordon and writer and artist John Stanisci to develop Gladiatrix, a historical action project set in ancient Rome. The project was announced as being simultaneously developed as an original graphic novel and television series through the brothers' Asia Minor Pictures. Gladiatrix was subsequently published as an ongoing serial beginning with the first issue of the relaunched Heavy Metal magazine in 2025.

In 2024, Charles and Vlas Parlapanides wrote the comic series INK for Heavy Metal Magazine, contributing to the publication’s tradition of genre-driven science fiction and fantasy storytelling. The story INK expanded their work beyond film and television into graphic storytelling.

== Filmography ==
=== Film ===
- Everything For A Reason (2000) - Writers, Director, Producers
- Immortals (2011) – Writers
- Death Note (2017) - Co-Writers

=== Television ===
- Blood of Zeus (2020–2025) – Creators, writers, executive producers

=== Comics ===
- Ink — writers; published in Heavy Metal Magazine

== Professional affiliations ==
Charley and Vlas Parlapanides are members of the Writers Guild of America (WGA). Charley is also a member of the Producers Guild of America (PGA). and the Association Internationale du Film d'Animation (ASIFA) ASIFA.

Charley Parlapanides has also participated in panels organized by the Writers Guild of America West's Animation Organizing Committee, advocating for union representation and Guild coverage for animation writers. In a 2024 interview with the WGA's Written By magazine, the brothers revealed that they had insisted on WGA coverage during their 2018 negotiations with Netflix for Blood of Zeus. Both emphasized the importance of securing union protections, including pension and health benefits, for writers working in animation.
