= Seis Manos =

2019 animated television series

- Also known as: Six Hands
- Genre: Martial arts; Supernatural; Action
- Created by: Brad Graeber; Álvaro Rodríguez
- Written by: Álvaro Rodríguez; Daniel Dominguez
- Directed by: Willis Bulliner
- Voices of: Aislinn Derbez; Mike Colter; Jonny Cruz; Angélica Vale; Vic Chao; Danny Trejo
- Composer: Carl Thiel
- Country of origin: United States
- Original language: English
- No. of seasons: 1
- No. of episodes: 8

Production
- Executive producers: Brad Graeber; Álvaro Rodríguez; Daniel Dominguez; Rob Pereyda; Ken Sasaki; Brad Woods
- Producer: Jason Williams
- Running time: 25–28 minutes
- Production companies: Powerhouse Animation Studios; Viz Productions

Original release
- Network: Netflix
- Release: October 3, 2019

Seis Manos (Six Hands) is an American adult animated action television series created by Brad Graeber and Álvaro Rodríguez. The plot is set in the fictional town of San Simon in 1970s Mexico and revolves around three orphans trained in Chinese martial arts. When their mentor is killed, they join forces with an American DEA agent and a policewoman to avenge his murder.

The series was released on October 3, 2019 on Netflix.

== Voice cast and characters ==
=== Main ===
==== Seis Manos ====
- Isabela – the eldest sibling of the Seis Manos, who acts as the heart for the trio keeping them together. She is a practitioner of the Hung Ga style of Chinese Martial Arts, and like her fighting style, she is a down to Earth person. Isabela has a just character, even willing to let Officer Garcia arrest Silencio for the murders he committed before Balde's arrival. Voiced by Aislinn Derbez
- Jesús – the robust jokester of the Seis Manos. He uses the Drunken boxing style of Chinese Martial Arts, and like his fighting style, he can still fight even when drunk. While the "idiot" of the group, he is emotionally wise in realizing Chiu's teachings about self-balance as events play out. Voiced by Jonny Cruz
- Silencio – the mute younger brother of the Seis Manos, whose tongue was cut out as a boy witnessing El Balde kill his family. He uses the Bak Mei style of Chinese Martial Arts, and like his fighting style, his eyebrows become progressively more white as the series continues. He is plagued by rage from his traumatic youth. Over the events of the series, his actions keep triggering the escalation of problems, such as Balde's claim to San Simon and Lo's rise to power.

==== Allies ====
- Chiu – an old Chinese Kung-fu master who has trained the trio of orphans, Isabela, Jesús and Silencio. Chiu has some knowledge of the evil to which El Balde is a part of, but dies after fighting Jaimito in "Toppled". The trio learn that Chiu was an assassin in his youth, and stole a treasure with immortality to hide it from his evil mentor. Voiced by Vic Chao
- Garcia – a Mexican Federale and the first female one in her region, who just wants something interesting to happen in her small town; she regretfully gets her wish with Balde's forces invading her hometown. She receives Garabina's mystic knowledge by the end of the series, which aids the heroes in stopping El Balde. Voiced by Angélica Vale
- Brister – an African-American Vietnam veteran turned special agent for the DEA who cooperates with Garcia on assignment with the Bi-National Task Force. Voiced by Mike Colter

==== Antagonists ====
- El Balde – The main antagonist. He was either mainly or partly responsible for the tragedies that led to the life paths of the Seis Manos. As a boy, his mother used his love for her to kill his father, and when she was to die from cancer, he buried her alive in a coffin which is also a statue to Santa Nucifera. As a cartel kingpin, he had plans that are reaching across Mexico with the use of his black powder from the Santa Nucifera statue. Voiced by Danny Trejo
- Alejandra – Balde's mother, and a witch with a Lotus crest medallion which is the source of her powers. It is her flesh that Balde uses to make monstrous servants and empower himself when battling. Her soul is imprisoned in her Lotus medallion, now in DEA custody.
- Master Lo – Chiu's mentor. Given the similarities of Lo's Peach Blossom sigil and Balde's Lotus sigil, Isabela realized some connection between them. He abducts Silencio with the goal to mold him into a weapon for his will.

=== Supporting ===
- Domingo – a 12-year-old orphan who hides at the dojo sanctuary of Chiu. After Jaimito's rampage in San Simon, Domingo is killed by a statue fall. Voiced by Carlos Luna
- Garabina – a curandera with insights into Balde, who helps the heroes in gaining evidence on Balde. She dies in episode "Blindfold" after telling Garcia how to stop El Balde.
- Lina – an auto mechanic who is also Silencio's lover. She had her right hand cut off by Balde in her childhood, creating a sympathetic relationship with Silencio. She admits to being one of Serrano's drug distributors, to keep the finances to ward off Balde. She is killed in "Reunion" by Lo.
- Padre Serrano – the town priest who was secretly a cartel Jefe, using his position to create a paradise in San Simon while engaging in illegal gains. He also acted as the only obstacle keeping El Balde at bay until his death in episode "Night of the Wolves."
- Jaimito – the first enemy of the series, his arrival in San Simon killed Chiu by heart attack, then manually killed others in town before the Seis Manos trio began their mission against El Balde.
- Larry – a DEA special agent in charge who was covertly working with El Balde to get rich with Federal Resources. Larry hates Brister for his insolence, as well as repeated affairs with his wife.

== Production ==
Seis Manos is Powerhouse Animation Studios's first original property, created and developed completely in-house.

== Episodes ==
| No. | Title | Directed by | Written by | Original release date |
|---|---|---|---|---|
| 1 | "Toppled" | Willis Bulliner | Álvaro Rodríguez | October 3, 2019 |
A death ritual to Santa Nucifera has the initiate, Jaimito, brand his hands and take a black powder. But before the ritual completes, he rampages and leaves taking the powder. In the small Mexican town of San Simon, orphan Domingo steals a mango and escapes Federale Garcia to a private home, where three foster siblings train. Domingo is invited to stay by Sifu Chiu with Isabela, Jésus, and 'Silencio'. Meanwhile, DEA Agent Brister is assigned to a Bi-National Task Force to intercept cartel, in the only Mexican town with no drugs. The next day, as Domingo leaves to repay a man he robbed, the trio go to find him while Sifu battles a demonified Jaimito; recognizing the brand on his hands, Sifu dies to keep Jaimito at bay. This fails as Jaimito kills many citizens in town, including Domingo and Balde's men who found him; the trio devastated upon returning home to find their father now dead. Brister witnesses Jaimito's rampage and works with Garcia to investigate the matter.
| 2 | "Grief" | Willis Bulliner | Daniel Dominguez | October 3, 2019 |
As the trio grieve over Chiu's death, Isabella buries Sifu and organizes his belongings, Jésus goes to drink in his sorrow, and Silencio seeks solace with his lover Lina. Despite Garcia's attempts to investigate, Brister's work ethic offends her, so he seeks out a "folk healer" for intel. After Isabella finds a tattoo on Chiu's upper back, she later finds his diary detailing his life, but is too busy to read it. Meanwhile, El Balde calls a meeting of all Jefes, who he has drink the blood from Santa Nucifera, sending them into frenzies to attack San Simon for the "hidden jefe". At the Dojo, Isabella and Jésus are attacked by the monster Jefes, and as they consume the corpse of one of their fallen, one Jefe regains his humanity and kills himself. After a moment with Lina, Silencio returns to the Dojo to aid his siblings; Remembering Jaimito's death, Isabella lures the monsters with Sifu's body into a storage of Dit da jow, and blows them all up along with most of the dojo hacienda. Opening quote: "The Dao is obscure and intangible. How can I know the origin of all matters?" – Dao De Jing, Ch. 21
| 3 | "Night of the Wolves" | Willis Bulliner | Álvaro Rodríguez | October 3, 2019 |
Garcia and Brister seek Folk Healer Mama Garabina for answers, and using magic she sees El Balde. Garabina grants them protective totems to continue their investigation, and Brister and Garcia relate over their respective similarities. Later, Garabina has visions of El Balde: the boy Baldemar, who loved his mother, but imprisoned her dying self in the statue of Santa Nucifera. With their home destroyed, Isabella asks Padre Serrano to examine a demonic finger they found, but it destroys itself. Serrano invites the trio to stay the night, but Jésus later discovers Serrano is cartel, and believing he killed Chiu he tells his siblings. The trio confront Serrano; Brister is hit by a stray shot, but is saved by the totem he received. As Silencio corners Serrano, Isabella tries calming him, but Silencio still kills Serrano, fleeing from Garcia and Brister. Opening quote: "When Justice is gone, ritual will follow. Ritual is the product of scant integrity, the beginning of chaos." – Dao De Jing, CH. 38
| 4 | "Caged Dogs" | Willis Bulliner | Daniel Dominguez | October 3, 2019 |
In jail, Jésus blames Isabela for their circumstance, while Garcia calls Lina about Silencio, who asks she run away with him. But Lina admits to dealing for Serrano, so a hurt Silencio races back to help his siblings. After Balde is informed of Serrano's death, he lures out Silencio by targeting his siblings. As Garcia, Brister, Isabela and Jésus work together, Balde gives Powder to two stray dogs to attack the precinct. While the group is surviving, town drunk Piojo defeats one of the dogs using a technique Jésus taught him. The other dog recognizes Isabela from when she fed him, so they repeat Piojo's method to revert the other dog. Upon exiting, Silencio had killed all the snipers, but Balde arrives and kills Piojo while thanking the trio for killing Serrano. Realizing Balde killed Chiu, Silencio savagely attacks with minimal damage against the powered Balde, who recognizes Silencio; distracting him long enough for Lina to run him into a building. As Balde regenerates, Garcia brings her car to evacuate them to safety. Opening quote: "The greatest rulers are the ones you hardly know exist. Next comes those who are beloved and praised. Next are the ones who are feared. Next are the despised." – Dao De Jing Ch. 17
| 5 | "Blindfold" | Willis Bulliner | Álvaro Rodríguez | October 3, 2019 |
Garabina drives to San Simon, as a vision shows her the mother of Balde, the witch who helped her kill her cobarde husband. In town, Balde recognizes Garabina, asking why his mother allowed her to see him last time. Arriving at Garabina's home, Brister calls the DEA who won't send help unless he can prove Balde's involvement, and the best place to scout Balde's actions is in the ruins of Chiu's dojo. There, they encounter Chiu's brother, Shifu Lo; Brister and Garcia see Balde's execution of the mayor, and race to save Garabina. Using Garabina's magic camera, they freeze Balde long enough to exfil Garabina, who informs Garcia of how to defeat Balde. From the Bai Si Ceremony, Lo becomes the trio's new Sifu, who teaches them to use the full force of their styles, and from meditation connects with Silencio to know his birth name. Opening quote: "Seeing through the obscure is clarity." – Dao De Jing Ch. 52
| 6 | "Reunion" | Willis Bulliner | Daniel Dominguez | October 3, 2019 |
Garabina dies and is buried on Dojo grounds, while Lo helps Garcia awake from her visions, which inform her where to save Alejandra, Balde's mother. As the group leaves, Lo kills Lina as he restores Chiu's journal to find what was taken from him years ago. In San Simon, Balde is contacted by someone over sat-phone, in which he ends their "partnership," and enslaves every child after killing all adults. When infiltrating Balde's hacienda compound, their cover is blown and a battle ensues; Brister recognizes an owl and kills it, severing Lo's spying on them. As Balde returns to the hacienda, he readies to kill Brister and confirms his boss works with him, but senses Alejandra's revival, with Isabela as her host. Alejandra tells a stunned Balde she will kill him. Opening quote: "Knives constantly being honed to stay sharp will not last." – Dao De Jing Ch. 9
| 7 | "Between This World and the Next" | Willis Bulliner | Álvaro Rodríguez | October 3, 2019 |
In the reality between life and death, Isabela meets Chiu while Alejandra uses her body to battle Balde, who is more empowered by vials of Powder. As Alejandra uses Isabela's martial prowess against Balde, while Jésus remembers Balde is weak to fire, like the monster Jefes that attacked the Dojo. In Between, Isabela asks about Chiu's tattoo- a Peach Blossom representing Immortality, not like Balde's Lotus symbol. With his guidance, Isabela helps Alejandra remember Balde as her son, but as Silencio and Jesus manage to finally kill him, Alejandra becomes vengeful and furious. Garcia binds Alejandra with a spell she used from Garabina's memories, she remembers her totem and "sweeps" away Alejandra into her Lotus medallion. Meanwhile, Lo searches the Dojo ruins for what Chiu stole from him decades earlier, finding it hidden in a dead tree and attaining immortality from the divine fruit. Back together, the group returns to the Dojo, but Isabela believes Silencio should be arrested for all the death he had brought. Inside, Silencio finds Lina's body, and his rage turns his right eyebrow fully white. Lo reveals himself, and his true alignment. Opening quote: "True gold fears no furnace fire." – Chinese Proverb
| 8 | "The Empty Place" | Willis Bulliner | Daniel Dominguez | October 3, 2019 |
Lo elaborates that Chiu was once his favorite pupil, having refined his bloodlust into being Lo's best assassin, but then he stole the source of Lo's immortality. He easily overwhelms them in a fight, impaling Garcia into a tree branch and stabbing Brister. Lo restrains Silencio, bringing him to the Empty Place and offers he serve him seeing his power, offering to teach him to be at peace of self; Silencio refuses, but is still taken away by Lo's forces. As word of Balde's death spreads, the San Simon orphans plan a rebellion and reclaim the town. Brister's boss, Larry, arrives at the Dojo to arrest Brister to cover up all of Balde's madness, even holding onto Alejandra's medallion from the hacienda. Waking up, Isabella, Jésus and Garcia leave for Garabina's hut to recover, and return to San Simon to mourn their dead. As Isabela and Jésus think how to get to China to save Silencio, the orphans offer Serrano's stockpile of money, while Garcia stays to rebuild the town, while in China, Silencio awakens at Lo's Temple. Opening quote: "Before embarking on a journey of revenge, first dig two graves."

== Release ==
Seis Manos was released on October 3, 2019, on Netflix.

== Reception ==
=== Critical response ===
The review aggregator website Rotten Tomatoes reported a 100% approval rating with an average rating of 7.7/10, based on 8 reviews.

In 2019, The Game of Nerds named the series as their "Best Netflix Original Anime of 2019" while in 2020 But Why Tho? included the series in their "7 Animated Series to Binge Right Now". Common Sense Media highlighted the series' combination of Japanese anime, Mexican folklore, and the stylistic conventions of 1970s exploitation films. While criticizing some of its stereotypical characterization, they found the combination of genres entertaining.

=== Accolades ===
In 2020, composer Carl Thiel received an Annie Award nomination for Outstanding Achievement for Music in an Animated Television/Broadcast Production for the episode "The Empty Place".
