= Everything For A Reason =

2000 American drama film

- Directed by: Vlas Parlapanides
- Written by: Vlas Parlapanides
- Produced by: Charley Parlapanides
- Release date: 26 October 2000; at AFI Fest
- Country: United States
- Language: English

Everything For A Reason is a 2000 American independent drama film written and directed by Vlas Parlapanides and produced by Charley Parlapanides. The film explores themes of brotherhood, love, and cultural identity in a Greek American community in New Jersey.

== Plot ==
Set during the summer on the Jersey Shore, the film follows Manny Papadopoulos (Dominic Comperatore), an aspiring writer living with his Greek-American family, who meets Eve Stephanopoulos (Erin Neill) after she discovers her boyfriend with another woman. Although Manny fears that a serious relationship will interfere with his ambitions, he becomes involved with Eve, while his best friend Teddy attempts to reconcile with his former girlfriend Jenny. The relationships among the group explore sex, romance and commitment within their contemporary Greek-American community.

== Premiere and festival screenings ==
Everything For A Reason premiered at the AFI International Film Festival in 2000 as part of its "New Directions from American Independents" program. The film subsequently screened on the festival circuit, including at the Cinequest Film Festival, the Brooklyn Film Festival and the Boston Film Festival. Its 2001 appearance at the Brooklyn Film Festival was billed as its East Coast premiere, where it competed in the Narrative Feature category.

The film was subsequently acquired for distribution in the United States by The Shooting Gallery, the independent film company associated with films including Sling Blade and You Can Count on Me. The company ceased operations in 2001, complicating the film's planned distribution. In a later interview, Vlas Parlapanides recalled that by the time the filmmakers regained control of the film, My Big Fat Greek Wedding had been released, changing the marketplace for another film centered on Greek-American culture.

== Reception ==
Everything For A Reason garnered critical acclaim from both audiences and critics. The film holds an 83% positive rating on Rotten Tomatoes. Behind the Lens Online described the film as "a summer love vibe that is fun, welcoming, and youthful," adding that it brings "an honest energy and well-developed characters to a culturally rooted coming-of-age story."

The film received positive notices from several critics during its original festival run. Reviewing the film during the 2001 WorldFest-Houston International Film Festival, the Houston Chronicle praised writer-director Vlas Parlapanides for his "nice light touch" and avoidance of broad ethnic stereotypes, while also highlighting the film's New Jersey seaside photography, supporting cast and musical score.

Chuck Wilson of LA Weekly described the film as a "charming romantic comedy", praising the chemistry between Dominic Comperatore and Erin Neill and writing that Parlapanides "writes well". Wilson characterized the film as an "imperfect but promising feature debut for filmmaker and cast."

Writing about the film at Cinequest, critic Sam Freund praised its dialogue, humor and observations about relationships. Freund described the film as having a "charming cast of characters" and characterized it as an antidote to the darker subject matter prevalent in independent cinema at the time.

Later assessments of the film were also positive. In 2021, Tessa Smith wrote that the film had "both heart and humor" and that, despite some elements having aged, it "overall holds up over time", particularly praising its depiction of Greek-American family life and its combination of contemporary and Greek music. Debbie Lynn Elias of Behind the Lens praised the performances and characterization, describing the film's overall atmosphere as "fun, welcoming, and youthful."

In a 2002 feature article, The New York Times highlighted the film's grassroots success and the cultural authenticity brought by the Parlapanides brothers. The article noted the filmmakers' Greek-American heritage as central to the film's emotional depth and uniqueness.

== Awards and recognition ==
Lead actor Dominic Comperatore received Best Actor recognition at the Houston International Film Festival for his performance as Manny Papadopoulos.
