= Blood of Zeus =

American adult animated television series

- Teaser poster with its former title
- Genre: Action; Adventure; Fantasy
- Created by: Charley Parlapanides Vlas Parlapanides
- Written by: Charley Parlapanides; Vlas Parlapanides
- Directed by: Shaunt Nigoghossian (season 1); Jae Woo Kim (seasons 2–3); Jae H. Kim (seasons 2–3); Joshua Covey (seasons 2–3)
- Voices of: Derek Phillips; Jessica Henwick; Mamie Gummer; Jason O'Mara; Claudia Christian; Elias Toufexis; Chris Diamantopoulos; Adetokumboh M'Cormack; Fred Tatasciore; Lara Pulver; Cissy Jones; Alfred Molina
- Music by: Paul Edward-Francis
- Country of origin: United States
- Original language: English
- No. of seasons: 3
- No. of episodes: 24

Production
- Executive producers: Charley Parlapanides; Vlas Parlapanides; Brad Graeber
- Editors: Shea Formaneck; Nick Simotas; Gregory Lewis
- Running time: 23–37 minutes
- Production companies: Powerhouse Animation; Asia Minor Pictures

Original release
- Network: Netflix
- Release: October 27, 2020 – May 8, 2025

Blood of Zeus, formerly known as Gods & Heroes, is an American adult animated fantasy action television series created and written by brothers Charley and Vlas Parlapanides for Netflix. Produced by Powerhouse Animation Studios and animated by South Korean studios Mua Film and Hanho Heung-Up, the first season premiered on October 27, 2020.

In December 2020, the series was renewed for a second season, which premiered on May 10, 2024. According to the creators, they originally had five seasons outlined. In July 2024, the series was renewed for a third and final season, which premiered on May 8, 2025.

== Premise ==
Set in mythical ancient Greece, the series revolves around Heron, the demigod son of Zeus, trying to save Olympus and Earth. Though Heron himself is an original character created exclusively for the series, the existence of such demigods born of the union between a god and a human is implied to be common in the original myths. The series claims in its prologue to be one of the tales "lost to history" rather than part of the current canon of Greek myths. It features gods, giants, demons, automata, titans, and mythical mounts from the original tales.

== Voice cast and characters ==
=== Main ===
- Derek Phillips as Heron
- Jessica Henwick as Alexia
- Mamie Gummer as Electra
- Jason O'Mara as Zeus / Elias
- Claudia Christian as:
  - Hera
  - Chrysanthe (season 2)
  - Theia (season 3)
- Elias Toufexis as Seraphim
- Chris Diamantopoulos as:
  - Poseidon
  - Evios
  - Brontes (season 3)
- Adetokumboh M'Cormack as Kofi
- Fred Tatasciore as:
  - Hades
  - Aratus Theogonis (season 1)
  - Sinis (season 2)
- Lara Pulver as Persephone (seasons 2–3)
- Cissy Jones as:
  - Demeter (seasons 2–3)
  - The Harpy (seasons 2–3)
  - Iris (season 2)
- Alfred Molina as Cronus (season 3)

=== Supporting ===
- Matt Lowe as Ares
- Adam Croasdell as:
  - Apollo
  - Hephaestus (season 1)
- Melina Kanakaredes as Ariana (season 1)
- Danny Jacobs as:
  - King Periander (season 1)
  - King Acrisius (season 1)
- Matthew Mercer as:
  - Hermes
  - Alexia's father (season 1)
- Vanessa Marshall as:
  - Ariana's sister (season 1)
  - Hestia (season 2)
  - The Furies: Alecto, Megaera, and Tisiphone (season 3)
  - Themis (season 3)
- David Shaughnessy as:
  - Chiron the Wise (season 1)
  - Dionysus (seasons 1–2)
  - Hephaestus (seasons 2–3)
- Jennifer Hale as:
  - Alexia's mother (season 1)
  - Artemis (season 1)
  - The Fates: Clotho, Lachesis, and Atropos (seasons 1–2)
- Sarah Elmaleh as:
  - Athena (seasons 2–3)
  - Artemis (seasons 2–3)
  - Theope (season 3)
- Jean Gilpin as Gaia (seasons 2–3)
- Dustin Harnish as Walla (season 2)
- Courtenay Taylor as:
  - Hecate (seasons 2–3)
  - The Maenad (season 3)
  - Potnia (season 3)
- JB Blanc as The Judges of the Underworld: Minos, Rhadamanthus, and Aeacus (season 2)
- Kari Wahlgren as:
  - Zagreus (seasons 2–3)
  - Melinoë (seasons 2–3)
- Julie Nathanson as Aphrodite (seasons 2–3)
- Rachel Rosenbloom as Gorgo (seasons 2–3)
- Simon Kassianides as Orpheus (season 3)

== Episodes ==
Season	Episodes	Originally released
1	8	October 27, 2020
2	8	May 10, 2024
3	8	May 8, 2025

=== Season 1 (2020) ===
No. overall	No. in season	Title	Directed by	Original release date
1	1	"A Call to Arms"	Shaunt Nigoghossian	October 27, 2020
Alexia hunts two demons close to a village where Heron works as a miner. As his mother is unmarried and he is thus a bastard, they are mistreated by the villagers. Their only friend is Elias, an elderly man. When a demon attacks Heron, Alexia injures and captures it while it is hiding in human form. Alexia explains that a cult of humans turned into demons is approaching and burns the human, revealing his demonic face to the villagers. Elias tells Heron the story of how the Olympian Gods defeated the giants, that were grown from the blood of the last Titans to fall in battle. Zeus made a deal with two giants to betray their fellows and throw their corpses into the sea, trapping their souls in a cauldron that was forged by Hephaestus and guarded by Talos. The body of a giant was later discovered by a human cult, who ate the giant's flesh and became the demons. Alexia invites Heron to become one of her soldiers, but he refuses to help save the villagers because of their mistreatment. Men from the village accuse Heron's mother of being a demon and attempt to burn her, only for her to burn herself to prove she is human after they beat Heron. Knowing war is coming, Elias tells Heron to mine the powerful metal adamantine from the top of a mountain to forge a sword. Elias, revealed to be Zeus in disguise, is confronted by Ares, who is surprised Zeus wants Heron to lead mankind.
2	2	"Past Is Prologue"	Shaunt Nigoghossian	October 27, 2020
Heron dreams of a queen giving birth to two sons, one her husband's and one belonging to another man. Heron brings the adamantine to Elias who begins forging a sword and tells him his dream came from the three Oneiroi, Phobetor, Phantasos, and Morpheus, the respective gods of Nightmares, Illusions, and Visions. Heron confronts his mother who admits she was once Electra, Queen of Corinth, but Zeus fell in love with her and she soon became pregnant. Zeus's wife Hera discovered Zeus's infidelity and sent the Oneiroi to tell the King of the infidelity in his dreams. When Electra gave birth to twin boys, the King tried to kill the son that was not his, Heron, but Zeus intervened and Electra killed the king. Zeus hid Heron and Electra under a layer of cloud so Hera could never find them, while Heron’s twin brother was left behind and assassinated by an uncle who wanted Corinth’s crown. Realizing Elias is his father Zeus, Heron tries to confront him, but finds only the completed sword which Heron rejects by impaling it into a boulder. Alexia's soldiers are killed by the cult leader but Alexia escapes with a map to their main camp, so a three-headed hound is sent after her. Zeus reveals himself to Heron to ask forgiveness but leaves after Heron rejects him. Alexia arrives with the hound chasing her, so she flees with Heron.
3	3	"The Raid"	Shaunt Nigoghossian	October 27, 2020
Hera swears to kill Electra and Heron, so Zeus threatens her to leave Electra's life in the hands of the Fates. In secret, Zeus removes the protective clouds so he can see Heron. The demons attacks, so the villagers flee to safety through Heron’s iron mine. Heron causes a rockslide crushing several demons, so the Demons leader tries to kill him, Heron only surviving when Zeus sends him telepathic warnings. Electra manages to hide from the demons, but the demons leader Seraphim demands the villagers tell him where Alexia is. Electra kills them when the Cerberus picks up Alexia's scent. Zeus hides Alexia's scent with a rose bush. Seeing Zeus actively intervening, Hera decides to intervene herself and redirects the Cerberus to Electra. Hera and the other Gods confront Zeus, reminding him Electra's life is supposed to be in the hands of the Fates. According to Zeus' own laws, they would be within their rights to execute Zeus to preserve peace among themselves. Zeus is forced to watch as Seraphim executes Electra and takes Heron captive to turn him into a demon. Hera gloats at Zeus' misery while Seraphim takes Electra's necklace commemorating Heron and his deceased brother.
4	4	"A Monster Is Born"	Shaunt Nigoghossian	October 27, 2020
Alexia comes across Zeus disguised as Elias mourning Electra before continuing after Heron. Hermes carries Electra's soul to the Underworld where she chooses to appear to Heron in a vision, reminding him to be strong. Hera appears before Seraphim. After forcing him to kneel before her, Hera tells him he is the firstborn son of the Corinthian King. When his uncle Acrisius dropped him from a cliff, he was found alive by Electra’s midwife Ariana who fled with him into the woods where she raised him alongside a bear and her cubs. When Acrisius' sons found them, they murdered Ariana and Seraphim's bear siblings. The mother bear killed all the men except for one of Acrisius' sons who escaped. Years later, Seraphim tracked down and murdered the surviving son before fleeing into the sea where he discovered the corpse of the giant. After eating its flesh, Seraphim retrieved the Olympian bident that killed the giant and used it to kill the pursuing soldiers, turning those that surrendered into his followers. Hera claims everything is Zeus' fault for not saving Seraphim the way he saved Heron. Seraphim is suspicious of Hera's motives, so Hera also reveals Seraphim unknowingly killed his real mother Electra, enraging Seraphim against Zeus.
5	5	"Escape or Die"	Shaunt Nigoghossian	October 27, 2020
Alexia goes to meet her mentor Chiron in order to translate certain portions of the map she had obtained from the demons. Chiron reveals that the map provides a path through the labyrinth where the body of the Giant that created the Demons is hidden. Alexia tries to leave with this information, but Chiron reveals he has betrayed her to the Demons in order to protect his people. He surrenders Alexia and the map to Seraphim, but not before discreetly covering the map in mud. Hera leads Seraphim to the sword that Zeus forged for Heron. She states that the sword can cut through anything, including the automaton Talos that protects the chest that holds the souls of the Giants. She also demands that Seraphim kill Heron who has been taken on board a galley where he conspires with other prisoners to break from their shackles and take control of the ship. Hermes reveals to Zeus that he saw Hera conspire with Seraphim and this revelation pushes Zeus to the edge and he rains lighting on earth in order to protect Heron from Seraphim.
6	6	"Back to Olympus"	Shaunt Nigoghossian	October 27, 2020
Saved by Zeus, Heron is taken to Olympus while Alexia and the other prisoners are directed to go to the entrance of the Labyrinth, even though the map was destroyed. Seraphim is directed by Hera to find an artifact called the Cauldron of Darkness. Zeus tries to appease Hera and swear his devotion to her, but she only intends to accept if Heron is killed. Zeus refuses the condition and Hera leaves with her followers to Hades who remains neutral and offers shelter to any god who asks. Poseidon leaves with her. Alexia and the others meet with Chiron who provides a copy of the map to atone for his mistake and they make plans to head to the Labyrinth through the Fields of the Dead. Heron is briefly trained and taught to control his anger when fighting before being summoned by the Fates who warn him of the influence he will hold in coming events before revealing to him that Alexia and the others are walking into danger. However, Zeus tells him he cannot go to help them as he is not ready. After Heron asks Zeus why he didn't stop Seraphim from killing his mother, Zeus reveals that Seraphim is Heron's twin.
7	7	"The Fields of the Dead"	Shaunt Nigoghossian	October 27, 2020
Seraphim is given a nightmare by the Oneiros. Zeus banishes the Oneiros and reveals he has helped Seraphim all his life, even saving him from Acrisius' sons when they killed Ariana. He also reveals Hera manipulated him into killing his mother Electra. Chiron leads Alexia and her followers to the Fields of the Dead where the Olympians defeated the Giants and warns them within the mist they must never run in case they disturb the poisoned ground. Several followers are killed fleeing from hallucinations. They make it to the labyrinth's entrance where Heron arrives and kills the Minotaur. Following Zeus's clues, Seraphim finds Acrisius living in a cave and kills him. Alexia and Heron find the Giants' corpse is missing and Seraphim has them in a trap. Seraphim offers Heron a chance to work together and kill the Gods, but Heron refuses. The rest of the followers are killed, leaving only Kofi the gladiator and Evios the thief. Hera attacks Hermes who had been following her and steals his soul-collecting arm brace. Apollo saves Hermes, but is injured by Ares who throws Apollo's body into the sea. Seraphim locates the cauldron and escapes Talos using Heron's sword. Hera releases the Giants, souls, returning them to their bodies before fatally injuring Zeus while disguised as Hermes. As Zeus lies dying, the Giants begin marching on Olympus.
8	8	"War for Olympus"	Shaunt Nigoghossian	October 27, 2020
Hera offers the Giants the oceans if they kill Zeus. Overhearing this, Poseidon returns to Olympus with Apollo, heals Zeus (Zeus used his lightning to close his wound), and reveals where Hera has the cauldron. As the battle for Olympus begins, Heron, Alexia, Kofi and Evios infiltrate the demons' camp. Zeus and Poseidon kill most of the demons and Giants, so Hera attacks Zeus. Heron realizes the cauldron is being held high in the sky by Hera's crows. Zeus overpowers Hera, allowing Heron to retrieve the cauldron while the leader of the Giants wounds Zeus. Hera is betrayed and almost killed by the Giants' leader, but Zeus sacrifices his own life to save her. Seraphim severs Hera's right arm, taking the cauldron while Hera flees. Heron engages Seraphim in a fist fight. Accepting Zeus training, Heron stabs through his own chest with Seraphim's bident, impaling Seraphim as well and summons Zeus’s lightning to finally kill Seraphim. Heron reaches the cauldron and once more traps all the Giants' souls inside, ending the battle. The next morning, Heron reunites with his friends and is welcomed to Olympus by his several demi-god half-brothers. Seraphim's soul awakens in the underworld where the bident is retrieved by its true owner Hades who offers Seraphim freedom from eternal punishment if he kneels to Hades as he once knelt to Hera.

=== Season 2 (2024) ===
No. overall	No. in season	Title	Directed by	Original release date
9	1	"A Shadow Emerges"	Jae H. Kim & Jae Woo Kim	May 10, 2024
An extended flashback reveals that, during the battle of Olympus, Hades commands his servants to steal the Eleusinian Stone, which grants its bearer the right to rule Olympus. Simultaneously, Zeus orders Hestia and Athena to place the stone in the hidden realm where Zeus was raised unseen by Kronos. After Hades’ servants fail to acquire the stone, his wife Persephone suggests that they recruit the now-deceased Seraphim, as his giant blood permits him to enter the hidden realm. After the battle, Gaia tells Heron to retrieve the sword Zeus forged to save Seraphim.
10	2	"Weights & Measures"	Jae H. Kim & Joshua Covey	May 10, 2024
At the site of Seraphim’s death, Alexia tries to comfort Heron, but he sympathizes with Seraphim’s hatred of the gods and rejects a summons by the Fates. In the Underworld, Seraphim rejects Hades’s attempts to intimidate him, choosing to be judged. Kings Minos, Rhadamanthus, and Aeacus sentence Seraphim to Tartarus. As springtime begins on Earth, Persephone leaves Hades and their children once again. Hades visits Seraphim in his torture and tells how, after Typhon was imprisoned, the world was divided according to three stones drawn by Zeus, Poseidon, and Hades. Zeus and Hera cheated to win the Eleusinian Stone, granting them rulership of Olympus. Despite their wrongs at the hands of the gods, Seraphim again refuses to help Hades.
11	3	"Winter is Born"	Jae H. Kim & Jae Woo Kim	May 10, 2024
Hephaestus grants Heron a compass which, with a piece of adamantine from the same vein, will guide him to the sword forged from it. Hades describes to Seraphim how he found existence in the Underworld unbearable until he encountered Persephone. Against Demeter’s wishes, Persephone took Hades as her suitor and bound herself to the Underworld. To appease Demeter, Zeus declared that Persephone would reside there only six months every year. Seraphim sympathizes when Hades reminds him of Gorgo, a priestess whom he loved as a human. They intended to marry until Seraphim killed the man who had killed Ariana, resulting in his pursuit to the cave and eating of the giant’s corpse. Hades reveals that Gorgo is now a wraith, unable to cross the Styx, and blames Seraphim for abandoning her. In exchange for Gorgo’s passage and erasure of her memory of him with the waters of the Lethe, Seraphim finally acquiesces.
12	4	"Funeral Games"	Jae H. Kim & Joshua Covey	May 10, 2024
The Fates warn Heron that an unknown intruder cut his lifeline during the battle of Olympus and that he will soon die. Hades returns Seraphim to the surface world with the power to alternate between his human and demonic forms. At Zeus’s funeral games, Ares mocks Heron and nearly beats him to death in pygmachia until Hera intervenes. The gods nearly come to blows over Hera’s right to attend when Gaia arrives and declares that, in three days, a challenge will be held to determine the next ruler of Olympus. Zeus’s spirit grants Heron his signet ring before being taken to the Underworld. Heron tells his friends that he intends to save Seraphim, to their shock.
13	5	"Judgement Day"	Jae H. Kim & Jae Woo Kim	May 10, 2024
In the Underworld, Zeus briefly reunites with Elecktra before being taken to judgement. Hera and Hades testify to Zeus’s virtues and faults as a ruler; Zeus is ultimately sentenced to Tartarus after confessing that he purposefully neglected Seraphim. Heron and his friends return to his home and discover an underground chamber, where a vision of Zeus says that Heron is prophesized to save the world from Typhon’s return. Evios parts ways with them upon hearing that a smuggler associate has escaped imprisonment. Seraphim confronts the Tree-bender, who killed Gorgo even after she correctly answered the riddle to cross his gorge. He kills the Tree-bender but is wounded.
14	6	"Crossing Paths"	Jae H. Kim & Joshua Covey	May 10, 2024
Finding no adamantine left on the original mountaintop, Heron and his friends discover that the Keres are feeding on survivors of Heron’s polis in the mines. They are nearly overwhelmed until Heron summons lightning to kill all the Keres but one, with a warning to only feed on the dead. The survivors’ leader suggests that Elecktra was buried in their graveyard for fallen heroes. Demeter confronts Hades over his conspiracy but offers to remain silent if she, Hades, and Persephone rule as a triumvirate when they win Gaia's challenge. Heron finds Seraphim passed out from his wound, not recognizing him in his human form, and revives him. After recovering, Seraphim refrains from murdering Heron after overhearing him confess his desire to save Seraphim. Heron discovers adamantine in the engravings on Elecktra’s grave. Gaia releases her summons to the hidden realm, where the contenders will face three challenges for the Eleusinian Stone.
15	7	"The Hidden Realm"	Jae H. Kim & Jae Woo Kim	May 10, 2024
Demeter unleashes poisonous spores upon the world, killing many mortals and weakening the gods. Hephaestus’s compass leads Heron and his friends to Talos, who is running amok and sinking Amazonian ships. They recover the sword and kill Talos with it, and Alexia reunites with her aunt. Athena confronts Persephone over Hades’ activities. Seraphim reaches the entrance to the hidden realm, guarded by the Kouretes. With the Oneiroi, he tricks them into drinking Lethe water and convinces them to let him pass.
16	8	"The Three Trials"	Jae H. Kim & Joshua Covey	May 10, 2024
In the hidden realm, Seraphim rejects a false offer to go back in time and change his life, then kills a dragon after breaking the illusion. A sphinx then challenges Seraphim to confront his worst fear, but Seraphim claims he has none anymore and enters a labyrinth next. Heron uses Zeus’s ring to pass the Kouretes and enter the hidden realm as well. The sphinx confronts Heron with the knowledge that he could have killed Seraphim and saved many others if he had not thrown away the sword. At the center of the labyrinth, where Zeus’s eagle carries the Eleusinian Stone, Gaia says that Heron must teach the gods the value of forgiveness. The gods arrive and battle for the stone until Heron claims it and pledges to be a forgiving ruler. But when he says Hades must return to the Underworld, Hades stabs Heron and claims the stone. Angered, Gaia declares none of the gods are worthy and resurrects Typhon to destroy them all.

=== Season 3 (2025) ===
No. overall	No. in season	Title	Directed by	Original release date
17	1	"A Breath Before Dying"	Jae H. Kim & Jae Woo Kim	May 8, 2025
A gravely wounded Heron has a near-death experience, but uses his powers to heal himself. Gaia releases Typhon who starts to attack Olympus. Heron tries to make amends with Seraphim, and offers his assistance in rescuing Gorgo in exchange for his support to defeat Typhon; however, Seraphim attempts to take Heron's sword. Gaia intervenes and restrains Seraphim, but Heron convinces her to let Seraphim go. Typhon attacks and injures a lot of the gods at Olympus. Hephaestus and Ares are killed while trying to fight him. Hades and Persephone escape back to the underworld to protect their children. Gaia approaches Cronus in Tartarus and requests him to establish order with the Titans' help. Heron and Seraphim decide to rescue Gorgo and leave the battle.
18	2	"Hades' Choice"	Jae H. Kim & Joshua Covey	May 8, 2025
Hades and Persephone reach the underworld, but it doesn't let Persephone pass as the six months she was supposed to spend in Olympus is not yet over. She waits outside and fights Typhon while Hades attempts to find the children. However, the Titan kills Persephone and a heartbroken Hades is captured by Cronus and the Furies, though not before he manages to hide his children. Cronus takes Hades' bident, frees the other Titans from Tartarus and restores himself and the other Titans to their former sizes, using a mechanism Hades had installed in the underworld to bring sunlight for Persephone. He asks Hades about where Zeus is kept in the underworld, but Hades does not divulge it. Cronus declares war against the gods in Olympus and orders his Titans to bring him Zeus.
19	3	"Hellebore"	Jae H. Kim & Jae Woo Kim	May 8, 2025
Cronus threatens to cast the souls of Ares and Hephaestus into the Abyss, which will erase their souls from existence....unless Hades tells him where Zeus is. When he refuses to do so, he throws them into the Abyss to the shock and horror of Hera and Demeter, who watch from a secret place. Cronus threatens Hades with throwing Persephone's soul into the Abyss, but King Aeacus interferes and tells him he knows where Zeus' soul is. When Cronus reaches there, Aeacus is revealed to be Hera who had made a plan with Demeter to free Zeus. They manage to remove Zeus to a secret location in the underworld. Hades is charged with carrying the weight of the earth instead of Atlas. Meanwhile, Seraphim heals Heron using Hellebore flowers from a Gorgon's blood. Seraphim tells Heron his plan to retrieve the Necklace of Harmonia, whch is desired by Charon, in exchange for ferrying Gorgo's soul and Heron vows to help him.
20	4	"Brothers' Journey"	Jae H. Kim & Joshua Covey	May 8, 2025
Cronus dispatches his Titans to destroy the gods' temples over the world. The Titan Theia advises Cronus in procuring Hecate's torch, a device which could help in locating Zeus. Hera reveals to Zeus she had visited Electra in the Elysian fields, who had told her she viewed Zeus not as a god, but as a person which is why he had loved her. Hera and Zeus apologize to each other for their past mistakes and Hera promises to help Zeus escape. During the funeral of Ares and Hephaestus, a grieving but vengeful Hera addresses the assembled gods, urging them to stand united and support Zeus. The gods present her with a mechanical arm created by Hephaestus, to replace her cut arm. Meanwhile, Cronus throws Persephone's soul into the Abyss, but she is saved by Hermes who brings her to Demeter. Heron and Seraphim are ambushed by the Titans, but are saved by Alexia and Kofi using Athena's invisibility cloaks. Heron tells them about his vow to help Seraphim, but they question why he wants to help Seraphim. He reveals that "The One" in Zeus' prophecy to defeat Typhon is not him, but it may be Seraphim.
21	5	"The Head of the Maenads"	Jae H. Kim & Jae Woo Kim	May 8, 2025
Heron and Seraphim continue on their quest to find the Necklace of Harmonia, with Alexia and Kofi joining them. They meet the Maenads, a cult of women who follow Dionysus, and is in possession of Orpheus' head, which could help them reach the necklace. After fighting with the Maenads and rescuing Evios, who had been their prisoner, they meet with Orpheus' head which tells them that the Necklace of Harmonia is housed in the Tower of the Winds, under the dominion of the deity Potnia. Orpheus reveals that their quest will not be easy as Potnia will play tricks on their mind and retrieving the necklace will require immense sacrifice. Meanwhile, Cronus tries to capture Hecate to obtain her torch, but she narrowly escapes him.
22	6	"The Tower of the Winds"	Jae H. Kim & Joshua Covey	May 8, 2025
Hera asks one of the Hecatoncheires, Briareus, to let her meet the cyclops Brontes. She wants him to make a copy of Hades' bident, but it wouldn't have its power. Meanwhile, Heron, Seraphim, Alexia, Kofi and Evios reach the Tower of the Winds. Inside, Potnia makes them fight each other, possessing one after another, watching them through the mirrors. Alexia recalls her warning from Orpheus and starts breaking them. She finds Potnia sitting in a room with the necklace and tries to grab it, but Potnia attacks her. Kofi saves her, but gets wounded and finally sacrifices himself while killing Potnia. The rest of them escape with the necklace and reach the gates of underworld.
23	7	"Land of the Dead"	Jae H. Kim & Jae Woo Kim	May 8, 2025
Heron and Seraphim enter the underworld and give the necklace to Charon, who ferries Gorgo across the Styx. Gorgo kisses Seraphim, but he reveals his demonic form to her and tells her to move on. When she tells him she still loves him, he leaves her and gives her the waters of the Lethe to erase her memories. Gorgo is judged to go to the Mourning Fields due to her life before becoming a priestess and is taken by the Furies on Cronus' orders. Seraphim tries to rescue her, but Heron stops him and tells him to wait. Outside the underworld, they encounter Hera who asks their forgiveness and urges them to unite with the Olympians and defeat Cronus, to which they agree. Cronus and the Titans reach the base of Mount Olympus and proposes a truce: all the gods drink the waters of the Lethe, forget their past lives, and they will be allowed to live, or fight him and die. The gods present their champions: Heron and Seraphim. Cronus brings forth Gorgo to Seraphim and tells him he can live with her if he joins Cronus, and Seraphim considers it.
24	8	"A Champion's Challenge"	Jae H. Kim & Joshua Covey	May 8, 2025
Heron dissuades Seraphim from joining Cronus. Hera proposes a duel between champions to settle the conflict between the Olympians and Titans, which Cronus agrees to, stating Typhon and he will be their champions. Demeter confesses to Heron that she cut his life thread and offers to fix it, but he declines and says he has accepted his destiny. Alexia and Heron acknowledge that they love each other and share a kiss. Heron and Seraphim have a heart-to-heart talk and acknowledge their bond as brothers with Heron requesting Seraphim to take his sword if he dies. During the battle, Heron channels his divine powers to kill Typhon, but sacrifices himself in the process. Meanwhile, gods replace Hades' bident with the replica created by Brontes. Hermes uses the original to free Zeus and Hades from the underworld. Together with their allies, gods launch a surprise attack on Cronus and the Titans. Seraphim, wielding Heron's sword, deals Cronus the killing blow, fulfilling the prophecy of the chosen one, and the Titans either yield, or flee. In the aftermath of the battle, the Titans are re-imprisoned in Tartarus. The gods honour Heron and Seraphim as 'The Hero' and 'The One' and build statues for them. They also create constellations in the sky for Heron, Ares, Hephaestus, and Persephone. In the Elysian fields, Electra joyfully reunites with Heron and Seraphim.

== Production ==
According to an interview with series creators Charley and Vlas Parlapanides by Valentina Capoccia of Salicomix, the series was conceived with the idea of exploring Greek mythology from a fresh perspective, rather than retelling familiar myths. They cited Steven Pressfield's novel Gates of Fire, which depicts the Battle of Thermopylae through the eyes of a helot, as an influence. They applied this narrative approach by creating Heron, an original character imagined as the illegitimate son of Zeus, allowing the story to feel both intimate and unpredictable. The creators also noted that Heron's character arc was inspired by classical heroes such as Perseus and Theseus, while simultaneously addressing modern themes of identity, anger, and acceptance. His counterpart, Seraphim, was designed as a morally ambiguous figure embodying both tragedy and menace, echoing mythological figures such as Achilles and Medea. The creators described the contrast between Heron's personal growth and Seraphim's destructive rage as central to the show's dramatic tension.

The series was produced by Powerhouse Animation Studios, with animation work also undertaken by South Korean studios Mua Film and Hanho Heung-Up. The creators highlighted the contributions of character designer Katie Silva and background artist Jesse Piles to the first season's visual development.

Production of the second season was affected by high demand for animation services, which limited the availability of overseas studios. According to the creators, the scripts were completed before a suitable animation studio became available, contributing to the extended interval between the first and second seasons. Industry strikes further delayed production.

== Reception ==
=== Critical response ===
==== Season 1 ====
Critical response of Blood of Zeus
Season	Rotten Tomatoes
1	100% (21 reviews)
2	100% (15 reviews)
3	100% (9 reviews)

On the review aggregator website Rotten Tomatoes, the first season holds an approval rating of 100% based on 21 reviews, with an average rating of 8.14/10. The website's critics consensus reads, "Reforging Greek mythology as an epic battle royale with slick imagery and sterling voice acting, Blood of Zeus earns a spot on the Mount Olympus of action animation."

Eric Francisco of Inverse called the series "Netflix's best American anime yet", while David Griffin of IGN gave it a 9/10 score. In a post summarizing an interview on her podcast with the show's creators, Kate Sánchez argued that the series offers a "nuanced take on anger and how it relates to power" and noted how the series is part of the "continuing trend of adult animation." Margaret Lyons of The New York Times also praised the show, calling it, "special and dazzling" and remarked on the series' large-scale storytelling and dramatic scope. Thomas West of Yardbarker called the series "one of the more extraordinary recent offerings" of television that depicts the myths of ancient Greece, while Sawyer Grant of Ranker named Blood of Zeus their #1 Greek mythology show.

==== Season 2 ====
The second season holds an approval rating of 100% on Rotten Tomatoes based on 15 reviews. The website's critics consensus reads, "Blood of Zeus long-awaited second season steps down from Olympus to explore Greek myth's underworld, finding even more compelling lore and emotional texture than before."

Marilo Delgado from Espinof gave the second season a 4.5/5 score and wrote, "Blood of Zeus once again proves that it is one of the most entertaining animated series available." Daniel Kurland from Bubblebladder wrote, "Blood of Zeus was a fascinating dissection of not just Greek mythology, but demystifying the larger-than-life figures who are the basis from so much of modern culture's mythology and storytelling." Kate Sánchez from BUT WHY THO? gave the second season a 9.5/10 score and wrote "With fantastic animation that captures epic action moments and emotional character growth that goes far beyond expectations, Blood of Zeus second season is near perfect." Britany Murphy from Muses of Media gave the Second Season a 4.5/5 score and wrote, "The much-anticipated second season of Blood of Zeus has finally graced our screens, and it's a magnificent continuation of the divine drama that captured our attention in the first season." Frantz Jerome of Black Nerd Problems wrote that "Blood of Zeus deeply engages in the ethos of Greek society... The kinds of decisions characters make, the direction of a plot, the design of a character – each of these things hinges on culture".

==== Season 3 ====
The third season holds an approval rating of 100% on Rotten Tomatoes based on 9 reviews.

Paul Tassi of Forbes wrote, "I would highly recommend Blood of Zeus...The level of quality has been stellar and it's nice to watch something fully original for a change". Andres Cabrera of Geeks of Color called the show "remarkable", stating that "Blood of Zeus quickly set itself apart with a focused plot set in the world of Greek mythos complete with amazing references and a true genuine love of the canvas that the world of the Gods of Olympus and the Underworld offer". Kate Sánchez of But Why Tho? praised the final season for bringing the story to a satisfying close, stating that the third season "completes an epic story". Alfred Molina's performance as Cronus also drew praise, with Anushka Bhattacharya of MSN noting that he "shines bright" in the role. Daniel Kurland of Den of Geek praised the series, calling it "a godly finish to a series that's always been incredibly passionate and sincere in its storytelling", adding that, "Everything comes together in Blood of Zeus season 3, which makes this an extremely satisfying conclusion to a truly epic story". Blood of Zeus has been compared to the series Game of Thrones with Margaret Lyons of The New York Times having wrote that the series "scratches that Game of Thrones itch", while Carolyn Jenkins of Collider described it as a "no-holds-barred epic" that is "just as bloody and dramatic as Game of Thrones". Memory Ngulube of Screen Rant called Blood of Zeus "undoubtedly one of the streamer's best" fantasy shows, praising it as a "hidden gem" and for its intricate storytelling and well-developed characters while Matt Kamen of Wired also stated that the series "impressed with smart writing that offers compelling twists on the classic myths".

=== Audience response ===
Following the release of the first season, Blood of Zeus trended on Twitter, drawing positive reactions from viewers. ComicBook.com reported that fans praised the series' animation and character designs, with some comparing it to Netflix's Castlevania.

=== Best of Lists ===
Blood of Zeus has appeared on several publications' year-end best-of lists and rankings of animated, fantasy, and mythology-based television series. Following the release of the first season, Android Authority selected the series as its editors' choice for "Best Anime Series of the Year", while readers selected it as the runner-up. But Why Tho? listed the series among its "Top Anime" and "Top Animated Shows" of the year while Eggplante included the series in its "Twenty Best TV Shows of 2020" and Collider ranked Blood of Zeus on its list of "Ten Best Shows Based on Mythology".

Following the release of the second season, Tom's Guide named the series among their list of "Five Best Shows about Greek Mythology" and The Direct featured the series as one of the "Best Anime Shows on Netflix".

Following its conclusion, the series has been listed among numerous editorial rankings such as Muses of Media's "Top 10 TV shows of 2025", Collider's "10 Best Fantasy TV Finales of the Last 10 Years", ComicBook.com's "10 Best Sword & Sorcery Fantasy Shows of the 2020s (So Far)", The Hollywood Reporter India's "10 Greek Mythology Movies And TV Shows", and Screen Rant's "10 Best High Fantasy Shows of the Decade (So Far)".

Editorial rankings
Year	Publication	List	Placement	Ref.
2020	Android Authority	Best Anime Series of 2020	–	
2020	But Why Tho?	Top Animated Shows of 2020	8th	
2020	But Why Tho?	Top Anime of 2020	4th	
2020	Screen Rant	Best Netflix TV Shows of 2020	7th	
2021	Eggplante	Top 20 Best TV Shows of 2020	16th	
2021	TV Guide	These Are the Best Animated Shows for Adults to Watch on Netflix	–	
2021	whatNerd	10 Best Netflix Original Anime Series Actually Worth Watching	1st	
2022	Entertainment Weekly	Best Anime on Netflix Right Now	–	
2023	Collider	10 Best Shows Based on Mythology	2nd	
2023	Digital Trends	7 Underrated Netflix Shows You Should Be Watching	–	
2023	The Direct	Best Anime Shows on Netflix Right Now	–	
2023	The Workprint	Netflix Original Anime Ranked	7th	
2024	Bubbleblabber	Best Adult Animated Series for 2024	6th	
2024	But Why Tho?	Top TV Shows of 2024	12th	
2024	EarlyGame	Top 15 Best Animated Shows on Netflix	12th	
2024	GamesRadar+	32 Greatest Animated TV Shows (That Aren't for Kids)	16th	
2024	Geek Culture	Top 10 Adult Animated Shows to Watch (2023–2024)	–	
2024	MovieWeb	Best Animated Series Based on Mythology	1st	
2024	Paste	Best God and Religious Mythology TV Shows to Watch Streaming, Ranked	8th	
2024	Screen Rant	Best Fantasy TV Shows of the 2020s	8th	
2024	The Tech Edvocate	10 Best Shows Based on Mythology	10th	
2025	ComicBook.com	7 Best Shows to Binge on Netflix in May 2025	–	
2025	FandomWire	5 God-Tier Shows to Watch on Netflix Before October Ends	4th	
2025	How-To Geek	Netflix Is Great for Adult Animation—These Are the 6 Best Shows	6th	
2025	Muses of Media	Top 10 TV Shows of 2025	–	
2025	Screen Rant	7 Underrated Fantasy Animated Shows That Everyone Should Watch	–	
2025	Screen Rant	10 Netflix Fantasy Shows That Are Absolutely Perfect	7th	
2025	Tom's Guide	5 Best Shows About Greek Mythology to Stream Right Now	–	
2025	Yardbarker	25 Best Dark Fantasy Movies and TV Series	–	
2026	CBR	Netflix Action Anime Where Every Episode Is a Masterpiece	–	
2026	Collider	7 Underrated Fantasy TV Shows	4th	
2026	Collider	10 Best Fantasy TV Finales of the Last 10 Years	7th	
2026	Collider	10 Fantasy TV Shows That Will Keep You Hooked from Start to Finish	6th	
2026	Comic Basics	Best Movies and Shows About Greek Mythology on Netflix	–	
2026	Collider	15 Best Fantasy Shows of the 2020s So Far, Ranked	4th	
2026	ComicBook.com	10 Best Sword & Sorcery Fantasy Shows of the 2020s (So Far)	5th	
2026	Consequence	10 Best Mythology TV Shows of All Time	6th	
2026	EarlyGame	15 American Anime That Can Be Called Masterpieces	15th	
2026	Game Rant	Best Netflix Original Anime	–	
2026	The Hollywood Reporter India	10 Greek Mythology Movies and TV Shows	10th	
2026	MovieWeb	10 Binge-Worthy Netflix Fantasy Shows That Are Better Than Harry Potter	–	
2026	Nerdist	8 Modern Greek Myth Adaptations	–	
2026	Rotten Tomatoes	100 Best Netflix Series to Watch Right Now (November 2026)	6th	
2026	Screen Rant	10 Best High Fantasy Shows of the Decade (So Far)	–	
2026	Shortlist	8 Epic Greek Mythology Movie and TV Adaptations	–	
2026	TV Insider	200 Best Netflix Shows According to Rotten Tomatoes	157th	
2026	TVLine	10 Best TV Shows About Greek Mythology	–	
2026	TVLine	10 Fantasy Shows Without a Single Bad Season	–	
2026	Wired	52 Best Shows on Netflix Right Now	–	

=== Accolades ===
In 2021, Paul Edward-Francis was nominated for the Annie Award for Outstanding Achievement for Music in an Animated Television/Broadcast Production for the episode "Escape or Die" and Ryan Brothers won a Concept Art Association Award for an Animated Series Environment for his piece titled "The Burning Polis". In 2025, Charley and Vlas Parlapanides were nominated for the Writers Guild of America Award for Television: Animation for the second season episode "Winter is Born" and the second-season trailer received a Golden Trailer Award nomination for Best Original Score in a TV/Streaming Series Trailer or Teaser, with Netflix Creative Studio credited for the submission. In 2026, Blood of Zeus was nominated for the Motion Picture Sound Editors Golden Reel Award for Outstanding Achievement in Sound Editing – Broadcast Animation for the third season episode "A Breath Before Dying", with Rob McIntyre credited as the supervising sound editor and Sound Rebels providing sound design.

Awards and nominations received by Blood of Zeus
Year	Award	Category	Nominee(s)	Episode	Result	Ref.
2021	Annie Awards	Outstanding Achievement for Music in an Animated Television/Broadcast Production	Paul Edward-Francis	"Escape or Die"	Nominated	
2021	Concept Art Association	Animated Series Environment	Ryan Brothers	"The Burning Polis"	Won	
2025	Writers Guild of America Awards	Television: Animation	Charley and Vlas Parlapanides	"Winter Is Born"	Nominated	
2025	Golden Trailer Awards	Best Original Score (Trailer/Teaser) – TV/Streaming Series	Netflix Creative Studio	Season 2 trailer	Nominated	
2026	Golden Reel Awards	Outstanding Achievement in Sound Editing – Broadcast Animation	Rob McIntyre (supervising sound editor); Sound Rebels (sound design)	"A Breath Before Dying"	Nominated	

=== Viewership ===
Blood of Zeus creators Charley and Vlas Parlapanides reported that the first season had accumulated 17.8 million viewers during its first 30 days of release, and credited the high viewership with the series being renewed. They also stated that the series reached first place on Netflix's daily rankings in more than 40 countries and peaked at second place in the United States.

According to Netflix engagement data compiled by FlixPatrol, the first season accumulated 47.2 million viewing hours in 2023, equivalent to approximately 11.4 million complete views. In 2024, it recorded an additional 21.9 million viewing hours, equivalent to approximately 5.3 million complete views.

The series has also appeared in Netflix's popularity rankings. Following the release of the second season, Tom's Guide reported that the series peaked at eighth place on Netflix's Top 10 chart in the United States. In a ranking based on international daily Netflix Top 10 chart placements, the series placed eighth among the most popular anime titles on Netflix during 2024.
