= Immortals (2011 film) =

2011 fantasy action film

- Theatrical release poster
- Directed by: Tarsem Singh
- Written by: Charley Parlapanides; Vlas Parlapanides
- Produced by: Gianni Nunnari; Mark Canton; Ryan Kavanaugh
- Starring: Henry Cavill; Stephen Dorff; Luke Evans; Isabel Lucas; Kellan Lutz; Freida Pinto; Mickey Rourke
- Cinematography: Brendan Galvin
- Edited by: Wyatt Jones; Stuart Levy
- Music by: Trevor Morris
- Production companies: Relativity Media; Virgin Produced; Atmosphere Entertainment; Hollywood Gang Productions
- Distributed by: Universal Pictures
- Release dates: November 8, 2011 (Los Angeles); November 11, 2011 (United States)
- Running time: 110 minutes
- Country: United States
- Language: English
- Budget: $75 million
- Box office: $226.9 million

Immortals is a 2011 American epic fantasy action adventure film directed by Tarsem Singh Dhandwar and starring Henry Cavill, Stephen Dorff, Luke Evans, Isabel Lucas, John Hurt, Kellan Lutz, Freida Pinto, and Mickey Rourke. Loosely based on the Greek myths of Theseus and the Minotaur, and the Titanomachy, the film was previously named Dawn of War and War of the Gods before being renamed Immortals. Principal photography began in Montreal on April 5, 2010.

Immortals premiered in Los Angeles on November 8 and was released in the United States on November 11, 2011, by Relativity Media. The film was a commercial success, grossing $227 million, and received mixed reviews from critics.

== Plot ==
When the Twelve Olympians imprisoned the traitorous Titans beneath Mount Tartarus, they lost the Epirus Bow. In 1228 BC, the genocidal king Hyperion searches for the bow to release the Titans; to this end, he captures the virgin oracle Phaedra, to use her dreams and visions to find it.

Theseus is a hoplite trained by the Old Man, who says Theseus has been chosen by the gods. He and his mother Aethra are outcasts due to Theseus being a bastard child. Hyperion attacks Theseus' village; Theseus kills many of his men before being captured, and is forced to watch as Hyperion murders Aethra.

The Olympians, especially Athena, are sympathetic to the humans suffering at Hyperion's hands, but are forbidden by Zeus from interfering in mortal affairs. Unless the Titans are released, they must have faith in mankind's free will to defeat Hyperion, though the other gods are skeptical as they noticed that mankind's strength of will is starting to fail. Zeus himself has trained Theseus in the guise of the Old Man, but reasons he has helped him as a human as opposed to a god.

Theseus is made a slave in a salt mine. Phaedra, held captive nearby, sees a vision of Theseus embracing Hyperion; she and her sisters then attack Hyperion's guards, provoking a riot. She uses the chaos to escape with Theseus and the other slaves. They pursue Hyperion, but are overwhelmed by his forces when trying to seize a boat. Poseidon, unseen by Zeus, dives from Olympus into the ocean, causing a tidal wave that wipes out Hyperion's men. Afterward, Phaedra sees a vision of Theseus standing near a shrouded body, which she takes to mean that Theseus must return home to bury Aethra.

As Theseus buries his mother in the village's sacred labyrinth, he discovers the Epirus Bow inside a rock. He frees it, but is attacked by Hyperion's henchman the Beast, whose armour resembles a Minotaur. Theseus kills him and uses the Bow to kill his allies' captors before collapsing from poisoned scratches inflicted by the Beast. Phaedra later tends to Theseus; having fallen in love with him, she begs him to take her virginity, stripping her of the visions she deems a curse, and they have sex.

They return to Phaedra's temple to kill Hyperion but are lured into an ambush, and the bow is seized by Hyperion's hyena. Ares directly intervenes to save Theseus, killing the attackers. Athena then provides them with horses to reach Mount Tartarus. Zeus suddenly descends and eliminates Ares for disobeying his law, while sparing Athena's life as she did not physically interfere like Ares did. Zeus tells Theseus that he and his allies will receive no more aid from the gods, as he must justify the faith that Zeus has in him alone.

Theseus warns King Cassander, leader of the Hellenic resistance, of Hyperion's plans to destroy the Hellenes and release the Titans, but Cassander dismisses the gods as myth, intending to negotiate peace. Hyperion uses the Bow to breach the city's immense wall, killing many defenders. Theseus rallies the Hellenic army and leads them against Hyperion, but Hyperion storms through, decapitates Cassander, and, before Theseus can stop him, uses the Epirus Bow to blast open the mountain and free the Titans. Zeus and the gods descend to battle the Titans, and they urge Theseus to fight Hyperion; Zeus destroys the Epirus Bow with Ares' Warhammer. The gods prove more powerful than the Titans, but are overwhelmed, and all are killed except Zeus and a badly wounded Poseidon; as Athena dies, she begs Zeus to not abandon mankind. Hyperion mortally wounds Theseus, but Theseus overpowers and drives a knife into him in an "embrace". Zeus collapses Mount Tartarus on the Titans and Hyperion's men, and ascends to Olympus with Athena's body and Theseus.

With time Theseus' story becomes legend. Phaedra gives birth to Theseus' son Acamas, whom the Old Man tells that he will fight against evil. Acamas sees the sky filled with Olympians, Titans and Theseus, in battle.

== Cast ==
- Henry Cavill as Theseus, a mortal chosen by Zeus to fight evil
- Stephen Dorff as Stavros, a cunning slave and master thief who joins Theseus on his quest
- Luke Evans as Zeus, the God of the Sky and King of the Gods
  - John Hurt as Old Man, a disguise used by Zeus to interact with mortals
- Isabel Lucas as Athena, the Goddess of Wisdom
- Kellan Lutz as Poseidon, the God of the Sea
- Joseph Morgan as Lysander, an Athenian soldier who joins King Hyperion
- Freida Pinto as Phaedra, a virgin Oracle who guides Theseus on his quest
- Daniel Sharman as Ares, the God of War
- Peter Stebbings as Helios, general of the Athenian forces
- Stephen McHattie as Cassander, the leader of the Athenian Council
- Greg Bryk as Nycomedes, the monk in service to Phaedra
- Alan van Sprang as Dareios, a slave who joins Theseus on his quest
- Mickey Rourke as King Hyperion, the King of Heraklion (loosely based on King Minos, not the titan Hyperion)

Additional actors include Canadian wrestler Robert Maillet who plays the Beast, Kaniehtiio Horn, Ayisha Issa and Mercedes Leggett as Phaedra's oracle sisters, Corey Sevier as Apollo, Steve Byers as Heracles, Gage Munroe as Acamas and Mark Margolis in an uncredited role as the priest of Phaedra's temple.

== Production ==
The film incorporated some elements from classical Greek myths. While it was initially intended to be filmed using 3D technology, cost considerations during filming resulted in a pivot to a strategy of filming in 2D and converting after the fact. It was filmed using the Panavision Genesis digital camera.

Director Tarsem Singh described the film as an action film using Renaissance painting styles during development. He described the film as "Basically, Caravaggio meets Fight Club. It's a really hardcore action film done in Renaissance painting style. I want to see how that goes; it's turned into something really cool. I'm going for a very contemporary look on top of that so I'm kind of going with, you know, Renaissance time with electricity. So it's a bit like Baz Luhrmann doing Romeo + Juliet in Mexico; it's just taking a particular Greek tale and half (make it contemporary) and telling it."

The film had a production budget of $80 million ($75 million after tax rebates) to $120 million and cost "at least" $35 million to market.

== Soundtrack ==
The score for the film was composed and conducted by Trevor Morris and was released on November 8, 2011.

Track listing
No.	Title	Length
1.	"Immortal and Divine"	1:30
2.	"War in the Heavens"	2:32
3.	"Hyperion's Siren"	3:47
4.	"Witness Hell"	1:56
5.	"To Mount Olympus"	2:54
6.	"Enter the Oracles"	2:30
7.	"Theseus and Phaedra"	1:37
8.	"Poseidon's Leap"	1:24
9.	"This Is Your Calling"	1:31
10.	"Theseus Fights the Minotaur"	2:13
11.	"Theseus Fires the Bow"	2:16
12.	"My Own Heart"	3:03
13.	"Zeus' Punishment"	2:27
14.	"Ride to the Gates"	1:00
15.	"In War, Fathers Bury Their Sons"	1:05
16.	"The Gods Chose Well"	1:18
17.	"Fight So Your Name Survives"	3:07
18.	"Battle in the Tunnels"	2:44
19.	"Immortal Combat"	3:34
20.	"Do Not Forsake Mankind"	4:33
21.	"Apotheosis"	1:44
22.	"Sky Fight/End Credits"	2:22

== Release ==
The film premiered in Los Angeles on November 8, 2011, and was released on November 11, 2011, in the United States.

=== Home media ===
Immortals was released on DVD, Blu-ray Disc, and Blu-ray 3D on March 5, 2012, in the United Kingdom and on March 6, 2012, in the United States and Canada. In its first week of release, Universal Studios Home Entertainment sold more than 1.2 million units of the film making it the week's #1 film in Home Entertainment. It sold 648,947 DVD units for a total of $11,116,462 and 926,964 Blu-ray Disc units for a total of $21,310,902 for the week ending March 11, 2012. An additional 100,000 3D units sold totaling almost $40,000,000 in home entertainment sales in its first week of release in the United States.

=== Comic book ===
Archaia Press released a graphic novel tie-in titled Immortals: Gods and Heroes, the hardcover book featured new stories that expanded on the universe established in the film.

== Reception ==
=== Box office ===
In North America, it was released on November 11, 2011. Immortals had a $1.4 million midnight showings and then grossed a total of $14.8 million on its opening day, topping the daily box office. It then finished the weekend of November 11–13, 2011 at #1 with $32.2 million, ranking as Relativity Media's biggest opening weekend to date, against newcomers J. Edgar and Jack and Jill. 3D showings accounted for a substantial 66% of the weekend gross. The film's audience was 60 percent male, 75 percent under the age of 35.

Outside North America, it earned $38 million overseas from 35 countries on its opening weekend. Its highest-grossing territories were Russia ($8.2 million), China ($5.7 million) and South Korea ($4.5 million). The film has earned $83,504,017 in the United States and Canada and $143,400,000 in other countries, for a worldwide total of $226,904,017.

=== Critical reception ===
On Rotten Tomatoes, the film has an approval rating of 50% based on 139 reviews, with an average rating of 5.4/10. On Metacritic, the film has a score of 46 out of 100, based on 23 critics, indicating "mixed or average" reviews. Audiences polled by CinemaScore gave the film an average grade of "B" on an A+ to F scale, rising to a "B+" among viewers under 25.

Contemporary critical reviews were mixed. Roger Ebert gave the film two stars out of four, writing that "Immortals is without doubt the best-looking awful movie you will ever see," while The Guardian awarded it three stars out of five, describing it as a mythological story distinguished by director Tarsem Singh's visual style. Todd McCarthy of The Hollywood Reporter was more critical, describing the film as "thuddingly ponderous" and "heavy-handed."

The film nevertheless appeared on several year-end lists. MTV gave it an honorable mention among its top films of 2011, while Guy Lodge included it among his top twenty films of the year for HitFix. It also appeared on TORO Magazine's Top Ten list and Glasgow To The Movies' Top Ten Films of 2011, while Marc Eastman of Are You Screening ranked it third among his films of 2011. The film also received several Saturn Award nominations, including Best Fantasy Film.

=== Retrospective critical reassessment ===
Although Immortals received mixed reviews upon its theatrical release in 2011, the film subsequently attracted more favorable critical attention, with retrospective assessments increasingly highlighting its distinctive visual style, elaborate action sequences, and unconventional interpretation of Greek mythology. Several publications have revisited the film as an underrated or underappreciated fantasy epic, with particular praise for director Tarsem Singh's visual approach and Henry Cavill's performance as Theseus.

Vocal Media included it among "5 Underappreciated Fantasy Films" in 2018, and Screen Rant subsequently named it one of the ten underrated fantasy films of the 2010s. On the film's tenth anniversary in 2021, Isaac Feldberg of Paste Magazine wrote that "a decade later, Immortals still feels sublime", describing its execution of Singh's visual approach as "something of a gold standard for other visual stylists." In 2023, critic Phillip Moyer called Immortals Henry Cavill's best non-Superman film and noted its renewed popularity on streaming services including Hulu and Max, where it reached as high as third place.

This retrospective attention continued in the mid-2020s. In 2025, Immortals was included in Collider's list of the "Best Greek Battles in Movies." Comic Book Resources described the film as "a very watchable and quite an underrated gem", while highlighting Cavill's performance as Theseus and describing the role as an important precursor to his later casting as Superman. That year, Collider also included the film in a feature on five Henry Cavill films it considered "amazing from start to finish", with writer David Caballero praising its visual style and calling it "arguably the last great movie based on Greek mythology." In a separate 2025 article, Collider writer Adam Blevins revisited the contrast between the film's initial reviews and its commercial performance. ScreenRant writer Tom Russell likewise highlighted the film's emphasis on visual spectacle and dramatic storytelling and praised Luke Evans's performance as Zeus.

The film has also continued to appear in retrospective recommendations of historical and sword-and-sandal films. In a Collider feature titled "20 Movies To Watch If You Love 'Gladiator'," Jeremy Urquhart included Immortals alongside films including Spartacus, 300 and Ben-Hur, citing its stylized action and Cavill's performance. In November 2026, fifteen years after its theatrical release, Immortals experienced another resurgence in popularity, reaching seventh place on Prime Video's United States movie chart, according to FlixPatrol. Writing for ComicBook.com, Anthony Lund attributed the film's emergence as a cult movie to its large-scale action sequences, noting that it had found a new audience through streaming despite its initially mixed critical reception.

== Best-of lists and rankings ==
Year	Publication	List	Placement	Type
2011	MTV News	MTV Movies' Honorable Mentions of 2011	Honorable mention	Year-end critics' selection
2011	HitFix / UPROXX	Guy Lodge's Top 20 Films of 2011	20th	Year-end critics' ranking
2011	TORO Magazine	The Best Films of 2011	Top 10	Year-end critics' selection
2011	Glasgow to the Movies	10 Best Films of 2011	Top 10	Year-end critics' selection
2012	Are You Screening?	Best Movies of 2011	3rd	Year-end critics' ranking
2017	Ranking De Peliculas	The 10 Best Greek Mythology Movies	8th	
2018	Vocal Media	5 Underappreciated Fantasy Films	Included	Retrospective selection
2019	Screen Rant	10 Underrated Fantasy Films from the 2010s You Have to See	Top 10	Retrospective ranking
2020	communiTV	Top 10 Greek Mythology Movies	8th	
2025	Collider	Best Greek Battles in Movies, Ranked	Included	Retrospective ranking
2025	Collider	These 5 Henry Cavill Movies Are Amazing From Start to Finish	Top 5	Retrospective selection
2025	Collider	20 Movies to Watch If You Love Gladiator	Included	Retrospective recommendation
2026	The Guardian	From Greek Epics to Biblical Blockbusters: The 20 Best Mythological Movies – Ranked!	20th	Retrospective critics' ranking
2026	TheWrap	The 10 Best Greek Mythology Movies Ever Made	9th	Retrospective critics' ranking
2026	Ranker	The Best Movies About Greek Mythology	6th (audience-voted)	Audience-voted rankings

== Accolades ==
Year	Award	Category	Recipient	Result	Ref.
2011	IGN Summer Movie Awards	Best Fantasy Film	Immortals	Nominated	
2011	IGN Summer Movie Awards	Best 3-D Movie	Immortals	Nominated	
2012	Saturn Awards	Best Fantasy Film	Immortals	Nominated	
2012	Saturn Awards	Best Production Design	Tom Foden	Nominated	
2012	Saturn Awards	Best Make Up	Annick Chartier, Adrien Morot, and Nikoletta Skarlatos	Nominated	

== See also ==
- The brazen bull, an ancient Greek device of torture and execution, is applied in the film to the maidens of the oracle.
