= It's a Small World: The Animated Series =

American animated television series

- Based on: It's a Small World
- Voices of: Michael D. Cohen; Elle Newlands; Dina Sherman; Lauren Tom
- Music by: Richard Sherman
- Country of origin: United States
- Original language: English
- No. of seasons: 1
- No. of episodes: 9

Production
- Running time: 4 minutes
- Production companies: Disney Interactive Media Group; Disney Television Animation; Powerhouse Animation Studios

Original release
- Network: Disney.com
- Release: November 26, 2013 – February 4, 2014

It's a Small World: The Animated Series is an American animated web series produced by Disney Interactive Media Group, Disney Television Animation and Powerhouse Animation Studios. Based on the Disney Parks attraction It's a Small World, it revolves around six multicultural children exploring new places, making new friends, and learning unique words and customs from around the world.

It premiered on November 26, 2013, as an online-exclusive series, and the final episode was released on February 4, 2014.

== Characters ==
- Marmura (voiced by Lauren Tom) is a New Zealand-American boy, and is typically viewed as the group's de facto leader. He is athletic and loves to play sports, frequently taking part in cultural games and competitions.
- Ashley (voiced by Dina Sherman) is a redheaded French-American girl, and a fashionista who enjoys trying on different clothes.
- Luis (voiced by Michael D. Cohen) is a Mexican-American boy who loves eating. He is normally seen tasting foods that are native to each place the group visits.
- Zanele (voiced by Elle Newlands) is a South African-American girl, and the most academically gifted. She enjoys learning about the histories of various landmarks in the world.
- Ling (voiced by Lauren Tom) is a Chinese-American girl. She occupies as a musician who can play any instrument.
- Harold (voiced by Dina Sherman) is a Dutch-American boy who enjoys creating art, specifically through painting.
- Wazoh (voiced by Michael D. Cohen) is a small bluebird who serves as the group's companion. He hosts a short segment at the end of most episodes titled Words with Wazoh, where he is capable of speech. In the segment, he teaches a word or phrase, usually related to the episode, in Spanish.
- Mr. Ballon is an anthropomorphized, colorful hot air balloon and the kids' main source of transportation.
- Mr. Cloud is a sentient cumulus cloud who shares a close friendship with Mr. Balloon.

== Production ==
It's a Small World: The Animated Series was a collaboration between Disney and language instruction company Rosetta Stone, and was created as a promotion for their then-recent kids' app, Lingo World Builder. The series was part of a year-long celebration for the It's a Small World attraction's 50th anniversary in 2014.

The theme song, We're on Our Merry Way, was written by the late Richard Sherman, who composed the song of the original ride with his brother Robert B. Sherman. Each episode features cameos by characters from one or two animated Disney movies, usually relevant in some way to whatever part of the world an episode is focused on.

The series was revealed at D23 Expo in August 2013, and was available to watch on Disney.com, in addition to Disney's YouTube channel and connected TV apps.

On April 11, 2014, Dina Sherman (the voice of Ashley and Harold) announced that a layoff at Disney Interactive resulted in the series having to cease production.

== Episodes ==
1. A Jolly Holi Day - As the kids travel to India, Harold is having trouble finding something to paint when he thinks there isn't enough color around. They meet Shanti (from The Jungle Book), who is just getting ready for the day's Holi festival, and invites the kids to join in. Harold is confused by the pin of a vina on his outfit, and as he sees more of them around, he is told that there is a message to their presence, but he must find that out for himself. As the colors begin to fade away, Wazoh leads Harold to a statue of Saraswati, who is holding a vina. The statue brings color back again, giving Harold inspiration to paint a picture depicting the kids' time in India, which Shanti keeps. Wazoh teaches the Spanish translation of the color blue, azul.
2. Bricht and Braw - The kids are on their way to Scotland, when they hear the sound of bagpipes. They meet Riley and Amanda, who inform them about today's highland games. They let Marmura participate, while Luis tries a clootie dumpling and haggis. Ling attempts to play the bagpipes, but has difficulty making it work properly. Marmura prepares for a tug of war, but finds himself outnumbered by the opposite team. With some help from an experienced player who tells her to blow steadily, Ling learns how to play the bagpipes, while Marmura's friends assist him in pulling his side of the rope, resulting in his clan winning the game. Wazoh teaches the Spanish word for the phrase "I like", me gusta.
3. Let's Go Fly - Travelling to Japan, the kids watch numerous kites fly around. Shoji tells them a kite festival is taking place today, and the group splits up to make their own kites. Marmura wants to play a sport, but he is told kite festivals are a sport, as participants must design the most appealing kite. Marmura wants something more action-packed, and Shoji shows him dragon kites specifically designed for battle. The kites fight each other in the sky, and even Ashley joins in with a butterfly kite. They are then directed to a big kite about to be released. Marmura's friends and many other kids gather around to lift the kite into the air. Wazoh teaches the Spanish translation for a kite, cometa.
4. Little Birds, Frost and Pine - The kids awaken in Mr. Balloon on Christmas Eve, and find Sweden decorated for the holidays. They meet a boy who attaches a plant onto a lamppost. When Ling reprimands Wazoh for eating the plant, the boy tells them the julkarve should be eaten by birds for good luck. He invites the kinds to help decorate more, and they scatter off to do their own activities. Luis tries out a bit of cookie dough, but revolts at the salty taste of it. He soon learns that the dough is meant to made into ornaments, of which are being made by Zanele and Harold. Luis wanders through the streets allured by the smell of gingerbread, but is disappointed when he realizes it's being used to make gingerbread houses. Still in search of food, he finds a platter of candy, but it is all taken by some birds to decorate a large Christmas tree. Everybody then gathers inside for the Julebord, as a starved Luis laments about not being able to eat anything. He is led inside of a building to find a table with a Christmas feast on top of it. Luis and friends sing a carol-style rendition of "It's a Small World (After All)" and "Jingle Bells". Wazoh teaches the Spanish translation for Happy New Year, Feliz Año Nuevo.
5. Tropical Hideaway - The kids' travel over the ocean to Hawaii, unsure if they will reach the island because of how small it is. After they are given a boost of wind to make a proper landing, they meet Logi, one of Marmura's friends. They've challenged each other to a race around the island with several parts to it, including swimming, running, and rowing. While the race is prepared, Marmura and his friends paint each other's faces. He learns that this year, contestants will race in teams of three, and has Harold and Ashley as his teammates. Before the race begins, Marmura maps out the course and assigns the roles each of his teammates will have. The race begins, and the two teams are neck-and-neck. When it finishes, Marmura discovers the opposite team completed the race before him, and won as a result. His friends apologize for making him lose the competition, but he insists that the only thing that matters is they had fun and worked together. Wazoh teaches the Spanish word for the beach, playa.
6. Up and Down - The kids make their way to Peru and land on top of a tall waterfall. This makes Zanele uncomfortable, as she is afraid of heights. Harold reminds her that she's up in the air with the others all the time, but Zanele explains Mr. Balloon makes her feel safer up high. They meet Pilel, and Zanele exclaims her desire to see the ruins at Machu Picchu. She takes them onto a boat made of reeds, through an island made out of the same material. They reach a mountain, which Zanele feels anxious about going up. However, Mr. Balloon lets her fly to the top inside of him. When everybody is finished climbing the mountain, Pilel explains Machu Picchu is on the other side of the village, which they can go to quicker by ziplining through the sky. Zanele once again stays behind, and Ashley, noticing how scared Zanele is feeling, suggests they use llamas to get there. Meanwhile, the other kids do several activities in the village. By the time Zanele and Ashley make it to the village, it's time for them to leave. Zanele apologizes to Ashley for having them take so long, but Ashley tells her that it's okay. Pilel directs the kids to a wooden bridge suspended in the air. Zanele, despite her fears, decides to take the bridge, but is visually struggling to make her way across. Ling realizes this and offers Zanele the chance to go back, but she insists on getting to the other side this way. She asks Ling if they can hold hands, and she accepts. The kids link hands and walk across the bridge together, and by the evening, they've reached Machu Picchu, to Zanele's delight. She leads the kids on a lecture of Machu Picchu's history. Wazoh teaches the Spanish words for up and down, arriba and abajo.
7. One Golden Sun - Wazoh notices a flock of birds fly by the kids, and they land in Morocco. They meet a boy who is studying the country's wildlife, and soon discover a young pink rhinoceros, who the boy says doesn't belong on the Coast, prompting a search for its home. Using Mr. Balloon, they search through Africa to find where the rhinoceros lives. They first arrive to a market and browse its offerings. They then go to a subway station and a jungle, where the rhinoceros finds camels for the kids to ride on. They then go to a forest where they play different instruments, like drums filled with water and flutes played with your nose. They then take a boat and see many waterfalls. On the top of a cold mountain, they see the rhinoceros' home. When they reach their destination, he is greeted by other rhinoceroses happy to see him back. Ashley thanks the rhinoceros for the journey, and the kids fly off. Wazoh teaches the Spanish translation for a bird, ave.
8. Just One Moon - The kids notice the Great Wall, meaning they're in China. A boy tells them they're just in time for Chinese New Year, and Ashley becomes disappointed when she doesn't get a new outfit. Ling points out she did get a pin and a red envelope, which she can use in exchange for something else. She wants to use it on a new outfit. Marmura notices the red lanterns hung around the place, which symbolize letting go of the past year to make way for the new one. Luis orders longevity noodles, and he is told that it is good luck to finish it all at once, so he begins slurping the noodle continuously. Ashley ponders using her money on a toy, but wants to use her money on black clothing, but is advised not to do it. Marmura gets his fingers caught in a Chinese finger trap, but before he is told how to get his fingers out, he tells the boy he wants to figure it out himself. Luis is still slurping on the noodle, while Ling and Zanele are puppeteering a dragon puppet. Ashley finds a clothing shop and comes across a greenish-blue dress that she likes. A storekeeper suggests that she wears red as the traditional Chinese New Year color, and she spends her money on it. She puts on the outfit and returns to her friends in time for the fireworks, causing Marmura to unknowingly free his fingers from the finger trap. Ling remarks how great fireworks are to start a new year, as the kids sing a reprise of "It's a Small World (After All)". Wazoh teaches the Spanish translation for a holiday, vacaciones.
9. The Rosetta Stone - At a museum in the United Kingdom, Zanele and Harold learn about the Rosetta Stone and its history with Ancient Egypt.
