= Powerhouse Animation Studios =

American animation studio

Powerhouse Animation Studios, Inc.
- Type: Private
- Industry: Animation
- Founded: April 1, 2001; 25 years ago
- Headquarters: Austin, Texas; Hollywood, California
- Key people: Frank Gabriel, Brad Graeber, Bruce Tinnin
- Products: Animation
- Number of employees: 175
- Divisions: Powerhouse Animation LLC
- Website: www.powerhouseanimation.com

Powerhouse Animation Studios, Inc. is an American animation studio based in Austin, Texas, United States. It was founded in April 2001 with a subsidiary called Powerhouse Animation LLC, established in the summer of 2014. The company develops and produces traditional 2D animation, motion comics, motion graphics, art assets, digital paint, illustration for television series, motion pictures, video game cinemas, commercials, advertising campaigns, educational properties, and entertainment companies.

== History ==
Powerhouse Animation's name is partially inspired by Raymond Scott's song "Powerhouse", which was often placed in scores that Carl Stalling wrote for Warner Bros. shorts and has been featured in numerous animated cartoons. In 2002, Powerhouse produced the short "Heroes" which parodied the film Clerks as well as Marvel Comics characters. After seeing the short, Kevin Smith, the director of Clerks, contacted the firm to produce an unfinished commercial from Dogma. After producing the short, Smith hired Powerhouse to create an arcade machine that featured a custom video game. The game was given, as a wrap party present, to Ben Affleck and Jennifer Lopez for their work on Jersey Girl. In the game, the main character is Lopez trying to rescue Affleck from an unknown villain and a band of ninjas. In 2003, the firm created a 35 mm test for a feature film based on Clerks: The Animated Series for Smith. They animated Clerks: The Lost Scene which was included on the Clerks X: 10th Anniversary DVD. As writer–director Smith explains in the introduction to the scene on the DVD, it had originally been written for Clerks, but was not filmed due to budgetary costraints. In 2004, they animated the "Mr. Mom" video for the band Lonestar.

The firm produces animated versions of many syndicated comic strips including Dilbert, Pearls before Swine, Cul de Sac, Liō, Pooch Café and Over the Hedge produced by RingTales. Powerhouse has animated over 300 Dilbert shorts. It has produced animated content for educational companies including TED-Ed, Brain Chase, Compass Learning, Ignite! Learning and the National Fire Protection Association. It produces animated content for websites, podcasts and other internet companies including several segments of the "B.S. Report Animated Archives" and "Jalen Rose Story Time" for ESPN's Grantland, and episodes of Kevin Smith's Spoilers series for SModcast and Hulu.

In November 2010, they finished working with Disney Interactive Studios to make the cutscenes for Epic Mickey, and in 2012, Epic Mickey 2: The Power of Two. In November 2013, Powerhouse worked with Disney Interactive Media Group and Disney Television Animation with collaboration by language instruction company Rosetta Stone to create a nine-episode season of It's a Small World: The Animated Series, Based on the Disney Parks attraction, It's a Small World. In 2014, Powerhouse Animation Studios, Inc. opened its first satellite office in Burbank, California. Powerhouse Animation LLC, a division of parent company Powerhouse, joined The Animation Guild and became a Signatory of IATSE (International Alliance of Theatrical and Stage Employees) in May 2015.

Powerhouse has produced animated advertising content for brands such as Old Spice, IAMS, Disney Parks, Disneyland, Metlife, Coca-Cola, Oreo, Mountain Dew, Ruffles, GoDaddy.com and many others. In 2015, they worked with Weiden+Kennedy to animate a segment for a Weight Watchers ad called "All You Can Eat" that aired during Super Bowl XLIX. Powerhouse has produced animated music videos for Lizzo, The Pains of Being Pure at Heart, Wale ft. French Montana, A Sound of Thunder and Lonestar. The firm also develops original IPs and has optioned a series to a toy company. In 2015, the company wrote, created, designed and voiced a short series for AwesomenessTV/DreamWorksTV called Advice Times with Grandpa Theo that can be seen on DreamWorksTV's YouTube page.

In 2017, Powerhouse worked on numerous cutscenes featured in the action-adventure game Agents of Mayhem. In October 2021, the studio worked with OfflineTV to create an animated music video called "Break Out" and worked with Sega to release a launch trailer for Super Monkey Ball: Banana Mania. In November 2022, the Sonic Frontiers promotional short "Sonic Frontiers Prologue: Divergence" was released, featuring animation by Powerhouse Animation. In September 2023, the Sonic Superstars promotional short "Trio of Trouble" was released. In November 2023, the Sonic Dream Team opening animation was released.

In February 2017, Powerhouse Animation announced their first adult animated series for Netflix titled Castlevania which is based on the video game franchise of the same name. In May 2018, Powerhouse announced their first series based on original property titled Seis Manos. In March 2019, Powerhouse announced a series based on Greek mythology titled Blood of Zeus. In August 2019, Powerhouse announced the series Masters of the Universe: Revelation which serves as a direct sequel to the He-Man and the Masters of the Universe series. In January 2021, Powerhouse announced two series based on the King Kong and Tomb Raider franchises titled Skull Island and Tomb Raider: The Legend of Lara Croft, respectively. In June 2021, the studio signed a first-look deal with Netflix. In June 2022, Powerhouse announced the series Castlevania: Nocturne which acts as a sequel to their previous Castlevania series.

In September 2026, it was announced that Powerhouse Animation would provide animation services for the animated film GodSlap, based on the comic of the same name by YouTuber Charles "MoistCr1TiKaL" White Jr. White revealed that Powerhouse approached him in 2023, expressing interest in adapting the comic into a movie, which is set for theatrical release in 2028.

== Projects ==
=== Television series ===
Title	Year	Network	Co-production(s)	Notes	Refs.
It's a Small World: The Animated Series	2013	Disney.com	Disney Interactive Media Group; Disney Television Animation	Based on the Disney theme park attraction It's a Small World	
Castlevania	2017–2021	Netflix	Frederator Studios; Adi Shankar Animation; Project 51 Productions; Warren Ellis Productions (seasons 3–4)	Based on the Castlevania video game franchise	
The Adventures of Kid Danger	2018	Nickelodeon	Schneider's Bakery; Nickelodeon Productions; Nickelodeon Animation Studio	Based on the Henry Danger (2014–2020) television series	
Seis Manos	2019	Netflix	Viz Productions		
Epithet Erased	2019	VRV; YouTube	Scrubba Dubs; Sound Cadence Studios		
Blood of Zeus	2020–2025	Netflix	Asia Minor Pictures	Based on Greek mythology	
Masters of the Universe: Revelation	2021–2024	Netflix	Mattel Television	Sequel to the He-Man and the Masters of the Universe (1983–1985) television series	
Skull Island	2023	Netflix	Legendary Television; JP	Part of the MonsterVerse franchise. Based on the King Kong fictional monster.	
Castlevania: Nocturne	2023–2025	Netflix	Adi Shankar Animation; Project 51 Productions	Based on the Castlevania video game franchise. Sequel to the Castlevania (2017–2021) television series	
Tomb Raider: The Legend of Lara Croft	2024–2025	Netflix	Crystal Dynamics; Story Kitchen (Note: Known as dj2 Entertainment for season 1); Netflix Animation; Panda Burrow; Legendary Television	Based on the Tomb Raider video game franchise. Sequel to the Shadow of the Tomb Raider (2018) video game	

=== Miscellaneous ===
Year	Title	Type	Refs.
2002	Heroes	Short	
2003	Clerks: The Lost Scene	35 mm test for a feature film	
2004	"Mr. Mom"	Animated video for the band Lonestar	
2015	"All You Can Eat"	Weight Watchers ad	
2015	Advice Times with Grandpa Theo	Short series	
2017	Agents of Mayhem	Action-adventure game cutscenes	
2019	Spidersaurs	Opening animation	
2021	"Break Out"	Animated music video	
2021	Super Monkey Ball: Banana Mania	Launch trailer	
2022	Sonic Origins	Trailer cinematic	
2022	Sonic Frontiers "Sonic Frontiers Prologue: Divergence"	Promotional short	
2023	Sonic Superstars "Trio of Trouble"	Promotional short	
2023	Sonic Dream Team	Opening animation	
2028	GodSlap	Animated movie	
TBA	Hell Followed with Us	Animated movie	
