= AnimaniA Awards =

Annual German awards for anime & manga

AnimaniA Award
- Awarded for: Anime & Manga
- Country: Germany
- First award: 2006
- Website: AnimaniA

The AnimaniA Award is an award for Japanese popular culture that has been presented by the German magazine AnimaniA since 2006. The award ceremony takes place during the opening ceremony of AnimagiC.

== Overview ==
The AnimaniA Award is an audience award, which means that the winners of each category are determined by the audience or the readers of AnimaniA magazine in a Secret ballot. Each participant in the online voting can rate the nominees up to five points or leave no answer. The titles and artists receiving the most points at the end of the voting period will be recognized at the awards ceremony. Around 12,000 votes were cast for the AnimaniA Awards in 2018 and in 2019 and 2020 around 15,000. Participants in the online voting have the opportunity to win non-cash prizes provided by the sponsors of the award ceremony. In the past, votes could also be cast by post . Each reader was only allowed to vote once. Readers who submitted multiple ballots were disqualified.

Titles that were first published in Germany in the previous calendar year are up for voting. For this purpose, the participating publishers present titles from their program in the individual categories. However, the nominees in the categories of Best Director, Best Character Design, Best Studio and Best Online Series will be named by the AnimaniA editorial team. Nominations are announced annually in the second print edition of the magazine each year; the winners on the website and in the sixth issue of the magazine each year.

Prizes will be awarded in thirteen categories (as of 2021) :

- Best Anime (Series, OVA, Movie)
- Best Online Series
- Best animation studio
- Best Director
- Best Character Design
- Best Manga (National, International)
- Best J-Music (Ani-Score, Ani-Song)
- Best J Game
- Best J-Movie/Series ( Live Action )

== Winners and nominations ==
=== 1st AnimaniA Award (2006) ===
| Categories | Winners |
|---|---|
| Best TV Series | chobits |
| Best Movie | Inuyasha – Affections Touching Across Time |
| Best OVA | Fushigi Yuugi - The Mysterious Play |
| Best Director | Hayao Miyazaki for Nausicaä of the Valley of the Wind |
| Best Character Design | Hayao Miyazaki for Nausicaä of the Valley of the Wind |
| Best studio | Studio Ghibli for Nausicaä of the Valley of the Wind |
| Best Release TV Series/OVA (German) | Chrono Crusade |
| Best Release Film (German) | Nausicaä of the Valley of the Wind |
| Most Wanted | Tsubasa-Reservoir Chronicle |
| Best Manga/ Manhwa | Wolf's Rain by Iida Toshitsugu and Keiko Nobumoto |

=== 2nd AnimaniA Award (2007) ===
| Categories | Winners |
|---|---|
| Best TV Series | Naruto |
| Best Movie | Final Fantasy VII: Advent Children |
| Best OVA | Hellsing Ultimate OVA |
| Best Director | Hayao Miyazaki for Howl's Moving Castle |
| Best Character Design | Hayao Miyazaki for Howl's Moving Castle |
| Best studio | Studio Ghibli for Howl's Moving Castle |
| Best Manga/Manhwa International | Death Note by Tsugumi Ohba and Takeshi Obata |
| Best manga nationally | Gothic Sports by Anike Hage |

=== 3. AnimaniA Award (2008) ===
| Categories | Winners |
|---|---|
| Best TV Series | Fullmetal Alchemist |
| Best Movie | The girl who jumped through time |
| Best OVA | School Rumble OVA |
| Best Director | Seji Mizushima for Fullmetal Alchemist |
| Best Character Design | Hayao Miyazaki for My Neighbor Totoro |
| Best studio | Studio Ghibli for My Neighbor Totoro |
| Best manga nationally | Grimm's Manga by Kei Ishiyama |
| Best Manga International | Vampire Knight by Matsuri Hino |

=== 4th AnimaniA Award (2009) ===
| Categories | Winners |
|---|---|
| Best TV Series | DeathNote |
| Best Movie | Fullmetal Alchemist - The Movie: Conqueror of Shamballa |
| Best OVA | Magister Negi Magi Negima!? OVA |
| Best Director | Tetsuro Aragi for Death Note |
| Best Character Design | Nobuteru Yuki for Escaflowne - The Movie |
| Best studio | Madhouse for Death Note |
| ANIMAX Most Wanted | Rosario + vampires |
| Best manga nationally | Stupid Story by Anna Hollmann |
| Best Manga International | Vampire Kisses by Ellen Schreiber |

=== 5th AnimaniA Award (2010) ===
| Categories | Winners |
|---|---|
| Best TV Series | Vampire Knight |
| Best Movie | Detective Conan - The Horror Score |
| Best OVA | Tsubasa Tokyo Revelations |
| Best Director | Kiyoko Sayama for Vampire Knight |
| Best Character Design | Asako Nishida for Vampire Knight |
| Best studio | Studio Deen for Vampire Knight |
| ANIMAX Most Wanted | Fullmetal Alchemist: Brotherhood |
| Best manga nationally | Life Tree's Guardian by Natalie Wormsbecher |
| Best Manga International | Elfen Lied by Lynn Okamoto |

=== 6th AnimaniA Award (2011) ===
| Categories | Winners |
|---|---|
| Best TV Series | Black Butler |
| Best Movie | Evangelion 2.22 – You Can (Not) Advance |
| Best OVA | Voices of a Distant Star |
| Best Director | Toshiya Shinohara for Black Butler |
| Best Character Design | Minako Shiba for Black Butler |
| Best studio | A-1 Pictures for Black Butler |
| Best J Movie | Death Note-The Last Name |
| Best J Game | Dissidia 012 (Duodecim) Final Fantasy |
| Best J Music Act | D'esparsRay - Immortal |
| Best manga nationally | The cloud by Anike Hage and Gudrun Pausewang |
| Best Manga International | Black Butler by Yana Toboso |

=== 7th AnimaniA Award (2012) ===
| Categories | Winners |
|---|---|
| Best TV Series | Angel beats! |
| Best Movie | Arrietty - The wondrous world of borrowers |
| Best OVA | Kakurenbo: Hide & Seek |
| Best Director | Hayao Date for Naruto Shippuden |
| Best Character Design | Katsuzo Hirata for Angel Beats! |
| Best studio | PA Works for Angel Beats! |
| Best J Movie | Gantz – Game for Your Life ( Sunfilm ) |
| Best J Game | Dissidia 012 (Duodecim): Final Fantasy (Square Enix) |
| Best J Music Act | Gackt for Attack of the Yellow Fried Chickenz |
| Best manga nationally | Various Artists for Grimm's Manga Special Edition (Tokyopop) |
| Best Manga International | Jun Mochizuki for Pandora Hearts (Carlsen manga) |

=== 8th AnimaniA Award (2013) ===
| Categories | Winners |
|---|---|
| Best TV Series | Blue Exorcist |
| Best Movie | One Piece-Strong World |
| Best OVA | .hack//Quantum |
| Best Director | Tensai Okamura for Blue Exorcist |
| Best Character Design | Takahiro Kishida for Puella Magi Madoka Magica |
| Best studio | A-1 Pictures for Blue Exorcist |
| Best J Movie | Gantz - The ultimate answer |
| Best J Game | Final Fantasy XIII-2 |
| Best J Music Act | An Cafe – Amazing Blue |
| Best manga nationally | Grimm's manga fan book by Kei Ishiyama |
| Best Manga International | Blue Exorcist by Kazue Kato |

=== 9th AnimaniA Award (2014) ===
| Categories | Winners |
|---|---|
| Best TV Series | Sword Art Online |
| Best Movie | One Piece Z |
| Best OVA | Rurouni Kenshin—New Kyoto Arc |
| Best Director | Tomohiko Itō for Sword Art Online |
| Best Character Design | Shingo Adachi for Sword Art Online |
| Best studio | A-1 Pictures for Sword Art Online |
| Best J Movie | Rurouuni Kenshin |
| Best J Game | Ni no Kuni: The Curse of the White Queen |
| Best J Music Act | TM Revolution - Geisha Boy |
| Best Manga International | Magi: The Labyrinth of Magic by Shinobu Otaka |
| Best manga nationally | Skull Party by Melanie Schober |

=== 10th AnimaniA Award (2015) ===
| Categories | Winners |
|---|---|
| Best TV Series | Fullmetal Alchemist: Brotherhood |
| Best Movie | Blue Exorcist-The Movie |
| Best OVA | High School of the Dead – Drifters of the Dead |
| Best Director | Yasuhiro Irie for Fullmetal Alchemist: Brotherhood |
| Best Character Design | Keigo Sasaki for Blue Exorcist - The Movie |
| Best studio | A-1 Pictures for Blue Exorcist - The Movie |
| Best J Movie | Black Butler - A devil of a butler |
| Best J Game | Tales of Xillia 2 |
| Best J Music Act | Dir En Gray – Ark |
| Best Manga International | Attack on Titan |
| Best manga nationally | Lost Ctrl by Evelyne Park |
| Special Lifetime Achievement | Hayao Miyazaki |

=== 11th AnimaniA Award (2016) ===
| Categories | Winners |
|---|---|
| Best TV Series | Tokyo Ghoul |
| Best Movie | Dragon Ball Z: Clash of the Gods |
| Best OVA | Hellsing Ultimate OVA |
| Best Director | Tomohiko Itō for Sword Art Online II |
| Best Character Design | Toshihiro Kawamoto for Noragami |
| Best studio | BONES for Noragami |
| Best J Movie | Kiki's little delivery service |
| Best J Game | Final Fantasy Type-0 HD |
| Best J Music Act | TM Revolution – Ten |
| Best Manga International | Hiyokoi by Moe Yukimura |
| Best manga nationally | Fading Colors by Nightmaker |

=== 12th AnimaniA Award (2017) ===
| Categories | Winners |
|---|---|
| Best TV Series | Attack on Titan |
| Best Movie | The boy and the beast |
| Best OVA | Black Butler-Book of Murder |
| Best Director | Tetsuro Araki for Attack on Titan |
| Best Character Design | Koji Odate for No Game No Life |
| Best studio | Kyoto Animation for Free! |
| Best Online Anime | Re:Zero – Starting Life in Another World |
| Best J Movie | Assassination Classroom |
| Best J Game | Pokémon Sun and Moon (Handheld) Final Fantasy XV (Console) |
| Best J Music Act | girugamesh — Chimera |
| Best Manga International | food wars! by Shun Saeki and Yuki Tsukuda |
| Best manga nationally | Goldfish by Nana Yaa Kyere |

=== 13th AnimaniA Award (2018) ===
| Categories | Winners |
|---|---|
| life's work | Isao Takahata (posthumous) |
| Best TV Series | One Punch Man |
| Best Online Series | The Magician's Bride |
| Best Movie | Sword Art Online – The Movie: Ordinal Scale |
| Best OVA | Tokyo Ghoul: Jack/Pinto |
| Best Director | Tomohiko Itō for Sword Art Online - The Movie: Ordinal Scale |
| Best Character Design | Shingo Adachi for Sword Art Online - The Movie: Ordinal Scale |
| Best studio | A-1 Pictures for Sword Art Online - The Movie: Ordinal Scale |
| Best J Movie | Attack on Titan - Movie 1 |
| Best J Game | The Legend of Zelda: Breath of the Wild (Console) Pokémon Ultra Sun and Pokémon Ultra Moon (Handheld) |
| Best J Music | MUCC for Myakuhaku |
| Best Manga International | your name. by Makoto Shinkai and Ranmaru Kotone |
| Best manga nationally | Kamo - Pact with the spirit world of Ban Zarbo |

=== 14th AnimaniA Award (2019) ===
| Categories | Winners |
|---|---|
| Best TV Series | Violet Evergarden |
| Best Online Series | That Time I Got Reincarnated as a Slime |
| Best Movie | your name |
| Best OVA | Danmachi |
| Best Director | Makoto Shinkai for Your Name. |
| Best Character Design | Masahi Ando and Masuyoshi Tanaka for Your Name. |
| Best studio | CoMix Wave Films for Your Name. |
| Best J Movie | Usagi Drop - The Movie |
| Best J Game | Sword Art Online: Fatal Bullet (Console) Pokémon: Let's Go, Pikachu! (handheld) |
| Best J Music | Dir en gray for The Insulated World |
| Best Manga International | My rebirth as a slime in another world by Fuse & Taiki Kawakami & Mitz Vah |
| Best manga nationally | Whispering Blue by CHASM ( Marika Herzog and Michel Decomain ) |

=== 15th AnimaniA Award (2020) ===
| Categories | Winners | 2nd place | 3rd place |
|---|---|---|---|
| Best TV Series | Goblin Slayers | Sword Art Online Alicization | Re:Zero – Starting Life in Another |
| Best Online Series | DEMON SLAYER – Kimetsu no Yaiba | dr Stone | Fruit's Basket |
| Best Movie | I want to eat your pancreas | Pokémon the Movie: The Power Within | Dragon Ball Super: Broly-The Movie |
| Best OVA | Violet Evergarden - Extra Episode | The Seven Deadly Sins - Signs of a Holy War | 91 days |
| Best Director | Takaharu Ozaki for Goblin Slayer | Manabu Ono for Sword Art Online Alicization | Masaharu Watanabe for Re:Zero - Starting Life in Another |
| Best Character Design | Kyūta Sakai for Re:Zero – Starting Life in Another World | Takashi Nagayoshi for Goblin Slayer | Gou Suzuki / Shingo Adachi for Sword Art Online Alicization |
| Best studio | A-1 Pictures for Sword Art Online Alicization | White Fox for Goblin Slayer | BONES for Bungo Stray Dogs |
| Best J Movie | Pokemon Detective Pikachu | Never Ending Man Hayao Miyazaki | GANTZ:O |
| Best J Game | Kingdom Hearts III (Console) Pokémon Sword & Pokémon Shield (Handheld) | Fire Emblem: Three Houses (Console) The Legend of Zelda: Link's Awakening (Handheld) | Final Fantasy XIV: Shadowbringers (Console) Persona Q2: New Cinema Labyrinth (Handheld) |
| Best J Music | Dir en gray for The World of Mercy | sukekiyo for INFINITIUM | Matenrō Opera for Human Dignity |
| Best Manga International | dr Stone by Riichiro Inagaki & Boichi | Fullmetal Alchemist: Metal Edition by Hiromu Arakawa | Cells at Work! by Akane Shimizu |
| Best manga nationally | #plushmoon by horror cushions | Bibi & Miyu by Hirara Natsume and Olivia Vieweg | LA Waves by PENGU |

=== 16th AnimaniA Awards (2021) ===
| Categories | Winners |
|---|---|
| Best TV Series | Demon Slayer: Kimetsu no Yaiba |
| Best Online Series | Jujutsu Kaisen |
| Best Movie | Weathering with You |
| Best OVA | Lupin III. vs. Detective Conan: The Special |
| Best Director | Haruo Sotozaki for Demon Slayer: Kimetsu no Yaiba |
| Best Character Design | Akira Matsushima for Demon Slayer: Kimetsu no Yaiba |
| Best Studio | Ufotable for Demon Slayer: Kimetsu no Yaiba |
| Best J Movie | Tokyo Ghoul S |
| Best J Game | Animal Crossing: New Horizons |
| Best Anime Score | Go Shiina & Yuki Kajiura for Demon Slayer: Kimetsu no Yaiba |
| Best Anime Song | "Gurenge" by LiSA for Demon Slayer: Kimetsu no Yaiba |
| Best Manga International | Demon Slayer: Kimetsu no Yaiba by Koyoharu Gotouge |
| Best manga nationally | The Secret of Scarecrow by Gin Zarbo |

=== 17th AnimaniA Awards (2022) ===
| Categories | Winners |
|---|---|
| Best TV Series | Dr. Stone |
| Best Online Series | Tokyo Revengers |
| Best Movie | Demon Slayer: Kimetsu no Yaiba – The Movie: Mugen Train |
| Best OVA | ReLIFE: Final Arc – OVAs |
| Best Director | Haruo Sotozaki for Demon Slayer: Kimetsu no Yaiba – The Movie: Mugen Train |
| Best Character Design | Yuko Iwasa for Dr. Stone |
| Best Studio | Ufotable for Demon Slayer: Kimetsu no Yaiba – The Movie: Mugen Train |
| Best J-Game | Demon Slayer: Kimetsu no Yaiba – The Hinokami Chronicles |
| Best Anime Score | Given the Movie by Michiru |
| Best Anime Song | "Good Morning World!" by Burnout Syndromes for Dr. Stone |
| Best Manga International | Blue Lock by Muneyuki Kaneshiro and Yusuke Nomura |
| Best Manga National | Bound by Anne Luise P. |
| Best Light Novel | Solo Leveling by Chugong |

=== 18th AnimaniA Awards (2023) ===
| Categories | Winners |
|---|---|
| Best TV Series: Disc Release | Jujutsu Kaisen |
| Best TV Series: Streaming | Spy × Family |
| Best Movie: Disc Release | Belle |
| Best Movie: Cinematic Release | Jujutsu Kaisen 0 |
| Best German Dubbing | Belle (Cinephone Filmproduktions GmbH) |
| Best German Voice Acting | Lara Trautmann as Suzu/Belle in Belle |
| Best Director | Sunghoo Park for Jujutsu Kaisen |
| Best Character Design | Tadashi Hiramatsu for Jujutsu Kaisen |
| Best Animation Studio | Kyoto Animation for Violet Evergarden: The Movie |
| Best J-Game | Pokémon Scarlet and Violet |
| Best Anime Score | Taisei Iwasaki, Ludvig Forssell and Yuta Bandoh for Belle |
| Best Anime Song | "Vivid Vice" by Who-ya Extended for Jujutsu Kaisen |
| Best Manga International: Shonen/Seinen | Tokyo Revengers by Ken Wakui |
| Best Manga Internatuonal: Shojo/Josei | Who Made Me a Princess by Plutus and Spoon |
| Best Manga International: Boys Love | BJ Alex by Mingwa |

=== 19th AnimaniA Awards (2024) ===
| Categories | Winners |
|---|---|
| Best TV Series: Online | The Apothecary Diaries |
| Best TV Series: Disc Release | Spy × Family |
| Best Movie: Cinematic Release | Suzume |
| Best Movie: Disc Release | Jujutsu Kaisen 0 |
| Best German Voice Acting | Tim Knauer as Loid Forger in Spy × Family |
| Best Director | Kazuhiro Furuhashi for Spy × Family |
| Best Character Design | Tadashi Hiramatsu for Jujutsu Kaisen |
| Best Animation Studio | Wit Studio and CloverWorks for Spy × Family |
| Best J-Game | The Legend of Zelda: Tears of the Kingdom |
| Best Anime Score | (K)now Name for Spy × Family |
| Best Anime Song | "Suzume" by Radwimps feat. Toaka for Suzume |
| Best Manga International: Shonen/Seinen | Alice in Borderland by Haro Aso |
| Best Manga International: Shojo/Josei | Villains Are Destined to Die by Gyeoeul Gwon |
| Best Manga International: Boys Love | Cherry Blossoms After Winter by Bamwoo |
| Best National Manga | Jovantore by Daniel Eichinger |

=== 20th AnimaniA Awards (2025) ===
| Categories | Winners |
|---|---|
| Best TV Series: Online | Solo Leveling |
| Best TV Series: Disc Release | Oshi no Ko |
| Best Movie: Cinematic Release | Spy × Family Code: White |
| Best Movie: Disc Release | Suzume |
| Best Director | Takashi Katagiri for Spy × Family Code: White |
| Best Animation Studio | Wit Studio and CloverWorks for Spy × Family Code: White |
| Best J-Game | Final Fantasy VII Rebirth |
| Best Anime Song | "Ambivalent" by Uru for The Apothecary Diaries |
| Best Manga International: Shonen/Seinen | The Eminence in Shadow by Daisuke Aizawa, Anri Sakano and Tōzai |
| Best Manga Internatuonal: Shojo/Josei | 7th Time Loop: The Villainess Enjoys a Carefree Life Married to Her Worst Enemy! by Touko Amekawa and Hinoki Kino |
| Best Manga International: Boys Love | Heaven Official's Blessing by Mo Xiang Tong Xiu and STARember |
| Best National Manga | Crossing Borders by Dominik Jell |

=== 21st AnimaniA Award (2026) ===
| Categories | Winners |
|---|---|
| Best online sequel series | The Apothecary Diaries (Season 2) |
| Best disc release | The Apothecary Diaries |
| Best Online Series | Gachiakuta |
| Best Movie: Cinematic Release | Demon Slayer: Kimetsu no Yaiba – The Movie: Infinity Castle |
| Best Anime Song | "ReawakeR" by LiSA ft. Felix of Stray Kids for Solo Leveling: Arise from the Shadow – Season 2 |
| Best J-Game | Digimon Story: Time Stranger |
| Best Manga International: Shonen/Seinen | Kagurabachi by Takeru Hokazono |
| Best Manga Internatuonal: Shojo/Josei | Reincarnated in a Mafia Dating Sim by Touko Amekawa and Sora Goto |
| Best Manga International: Boys Love | Our Sunny Days by Jeong Seokchan |
| Manga Publication Special Award | MANGA ISSHO |
