= AnimaniA (magazine) =

German manga and anime magazine

- Categories: Anime, manga and J-culture news and reviews
- Frequency: Bi-monthly
- Circulation: 13,841
- First issue: 1994
- Company: Animagine GmbH
- Country: Germany
- Language: German
- Website: www.animania.de
- ISSN: 0947-059X

Circulation of AnimaniA between the years 2001 and 2008 according to IVW

AnimaniA is a German magazine dedicated to anime, manga and J-culture.

== History ==
The first issue of the magazine was published in September 1994. AnimaniA is the first German-language media focussing on Japanese culture, especially anime and manga. Before the release of the first magazine, a volume zero issue had been printed and was handed out for free at Comic-Salon Erlangen for promotion.

In 2001, the former editors of AnimaniA started publishing MangasZene magazine which ended publication in 2006.

Until the publishing of the 50th issue, the magazine was published every two months. AnimaniA was then published ten times in one year until the release of issue 04-05/2010 and has been changed back to a bi-monthly publishing frequency due to the decline of the German anime market around that time.

The magazine was part of the publishing company Weird Visions Media Verlag until February 2010. When the publisher went bankrupt, chef editor Thomas Webler bought the magazine from Weird Visions and publishes AnimaniA under the Animagine GmbH label.

Since the publishing of the volume 04/2005 the magazine contains a special DVD containing most times three pilot episodes dubbed in German language, trailer, interviews and making-of videos.

According to Casey Brienza, AnimaniA was one fan magazine pioneering the medium manga in Germany.

== Themes ==
The magazine focusses on anime and manga news in German-languaged regions as well as for the United States and Japan, J-Culture like video games and music, a reader section for fan letters, fanart and a calendar for events related to Japanese culture. The magazine also published the Armitage III manga in Germany.

Sometimes, AnimaniA publishes special edition magazines dedicated to a main theme, which most are completely sold-out in print. These are:

- AnimaniA — FanArt Special — Fan-art
- AnimaniA — compiled edition of the magazines released in it′s first year
- AnimaniA — Sailor Moon special
- AnimaniA — Hentai special
- Armitage III (between 3/96–4/97)
- Groundwork of Evangelion — Art book
- The New Generation of Manga Artists — Art book

== AnimagiC ==
Employees of AnimaniA (more precisely of Animagine GmbH) are the organizers of German anime and manga convention AnimagiC.

== AnimaniA Awards ==
Since 2006 the AnimaniA Awards are held, an online voting for readership of the magazine. The awards show takes place on the first day at the AnimagiC convention. In the past readers were able to vote via mail.
