= Mannheimer Rosengarten =

Congress centre and concert hall in Mannheim, Germany

Coordinates: 49°29′05″N 8°28′38″E

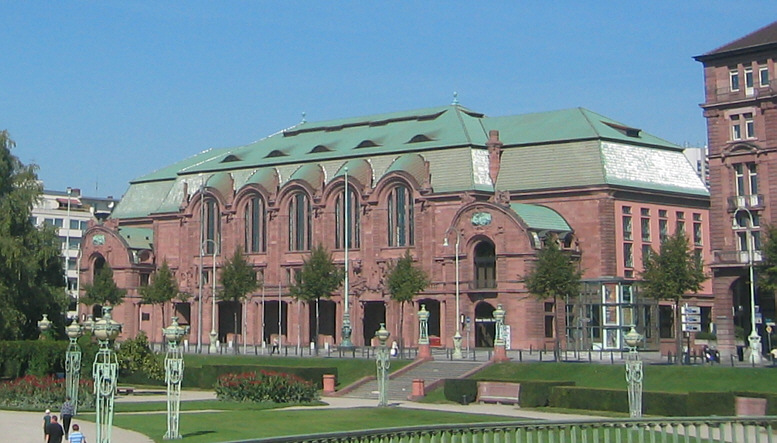
Mannheimer Rosengarten

Mannheimer Rosengarten is a concert hall and congress centre in Mannheim, Germany designed by German architect Bruno Schmitz. It was built between 1900 and 1903 in an Art Nouveau style, with a main hall that can accommodate up to 2,300 guests. Artists that have performed at Mannheimer Rosengarten include Sting, Simply Red and Whitesnake.

Since 2017, the AnimagiC, one of the largest anime conventions in the German-speaking world, takes place here.
