= Takashi Iwashige =

Japanese manga artist

Takashi Iwashige いわしげ孝
- Born: 31 December 1954 Kagoshima
- Died: 6 March 2013 (aged 58)
- Area: Manga artist
- Notable works: Hanamaru Legend
- Awards: 1986 Shogakukan Manga Award

Takashi Iwashige (いわしげ孝, Iwashige Takashi; 1954–2013) was a Japanese manga artist who wrote primarily martial-arts manga celebrating individuality. He is best known for the judo series Hanamaru Legend and its sequel, New Hanamaru Legend. He received the 1986 Shogakukan Manga Award for seinen/general manga for Bokkemon. Iwashige died at age 58 on 6 March 2013.

== Overview ==
In 1970, while still a high school student, his work Chiisana Inochi (Little Life) was selected for the 5th Newcomer Manga Award of Weekly Shonen Jump. One of the judges of the awards, Hiroshi Motomiya, commented that his work had a sense of life. This work was published in the magazine's New Year's issue in 1971, marking his debut.

At the time, Iwashige was enthusiastically drawing manga, and in the same year, Scrap was selected as an honorable mention in the magazine's first half of the Tezuka Awards. The Girl Who Sings the Blues was also selected as an honorable mention in the second half of the Tezuka Awards. However, Iwashige, who was still a high school student at the time, felt that his manga skills were immature, such as the roughness of his drawings. After that, he focused on his studies for a while.

After graduating from high school, he moved to Tokyo to attend university, where he worked part-time at a bookstore while drawing manga.

Once he graduated from university, he began submitting his works to Big Comic (Shogakukan). In 1978, his work Wasureyuki was selected for the 2nd Shogakukan Newcomer Comic Award, marking his full-fledged debut.

During the rainy season in 1980, Iwashige met Haruki Etsumi through Big Comic magazine and became his assistant. His contemporaries included Sakamoto Hyosaku, and he also worked with Sakamoto on Haruki's work, Jarinko Chie. At the same time, Iwashige serialized Bokkemon in Big Comic Spirits, which won the 31st Shogakukan Manga Award in 1986.

From 1988 (Showa 63), he began serializing Zipangu Shonen in Big Comic Spirits, and changed his pen name from his real name.

After that, he moved to Weekly Young Sunday and Big Comic Superior (both published by Shogakukan), serializing works such as Hanamaruden. After serializing Lonely on the Straight Road in Morning (published by Kodansha), he serialized Tanshin Hanabi in Big Comic from 2006 to April 2008, and later that same year began serializing Ukyo Hanabi in the same magazine.

He died on 6 March 2013, due to illness at 58 years old. His posthumous work, Kamikyo Hanabi, was suspended from 2010 while he was undergoing medical treatment. It resumed briefly in the fall of 2011, but was left unfinished until the 25 February 2012 issue, which was his final work.

== List of works ==
- Bokemon (Big Comic Spirits)
- Our Wakaba! (Big Comic Spirits)
- Two Bulls (Original story: Ryu Seko, Big Comic Spirits)
- Zipangu Boy (Big Comic Spirits)
- Zappera (Big Comic Superior)
- Ban'ei Run (Big Comics Superior)
- Hanamaruden (Young Sunday)
- The Fiend with a Hundred Faces (Big Comic Superior)
- New Hanamaruden (Weekly Young Sunda)
- Lonely on a Straight Road – A Side Story of Santoka Taneda – (Morning)
- Gate of Youth -Chikuho Edition- (Original work: Hiroyuki Itsuki, Morning)
- Single Flower Day: Shun Sakuragi's Single Life in Kagoshima (Big Comic)
- Kamigyo Hanabi (Big Comic, unfinished)
