= Kagurabachi =

Japanese manga series by Takeru Hokazono

- First tankōbon volume cover, featuring Chihiro Rokuhira (center)

カグラバチ
- Genre: Action; Dark fantasy
- Manga
- Written by: Takeru Hokazono
- Published by: Shueisha
- English publisher: NA: Viz Media
- Imprint: Jump Comics
- Magazine: Weekly Shōnen Jump
- Original run: September 19, 2023 – present
- Volumes: 12
- Anime television series
- Directed by: Tetsuya Takeuchi
- Studio: Cypic
- Licensed by: Crunchyroll; SA/SEA: Muse Communication
- Original run: April 2027 – scheduled
- icon

Kagurabachi (Japanese: カグラバチ) is a Japanese manga series written and illustrated by Takeru Hokazono. It has been serialized in Shueisha's shōnen manga magazine Weekly Shōnen Jump since September 2023, with its chapters collected in 12 tankōbon volumes as of September 2026.

The series follows Chihiro Rokuhira, a bearer of a unique and powerful katana called "Enten", one of the seven Enchanted Blades created by his father, Kunishige Rokuhira. Driven by vengeance, he embarks on a quest to avenge his father's murder and reclaim the six other stolen Enchanted Blades, which were taken by a sinister group of sorcerers.

An anime television series adaptation produced by Cypic is set to premiere in April 2027.

By October 2026, the manga had over 4.5 million copies in circulation. In 2024, the series won the 10th Next Manga Award in the print category. In 2026, the series won the Daruma for Best Action Manga at the Japan Expo Awards.

== Plot ==
The story takes place in modern Japan, 18 years after the end of the great war known as the Seitei War, where sorcery was commonly practiced in secret before finally being used in public. Chihiro Rokuhira is a young man who lived a peaceful life, training in isolation with his father, Kunishige Rokuhira, the legendary swordsmith who forged the famous Enchanted Blades, a set of six katanas capable of mass destruction, unlimited power, and near-infinite infused sorcery. They were once held by the heroes of the Seitei War, called Enchanted Blade Bearers, or more commonly, Sword Bearers, and ended the great war.

Three years ago, a criminal group of powerful sorcerers called the Hishaku attacked the Rokuhira residence to steal the Enchanted Blades. They murdered Kunishige and stole the Enchanted Blades, but Chihiro survived the attack. Determined to reclaim his father's legacy and avenge his death, Chihiro wields the seventh, secret Enchanted Blade, Enten, to find and destroy the Hishaku before they can unleash a catastrophe that would bring the whole country into chaos. However, Chihiro must also face the consequences of his father's and the Sword Bearers' actions, which led to the catastrophic technique of the Sword Master, Akemura Soga, called Malediction, resulting in the genocide of their enemies, the Mikaboshi, and the inhabitants of Shokoku Island.

== Characters ==
=== Chihiro's group ===
Chihiro Rokuhira (六平 千鉱, Rokuhira Chihiro)
Voiced by: Shoya Ishige (voiced comic), Taihi Kimura (anime)
Chihiro is the 18-year-old son of the late master blacksmith Kunishige Rokuhira, trained under his father in childhood with hopes of continuing his legacy. After Kunishige's murder and the theft of his forged Enchanted Blades (妖刀, Yōtō), Chihiro vows revenge against the culprits, the Hishaku, wielding his father's last remaining blade, Enten (淵天). Though driven by vengeance, he avoids harming innocents during his pursuit. While typically stoic, he demonstrates compassion and loyalty to allies. Enten grants him enhanced physical abilities, energy absorption, and the power to unleash magical slashes. A keen observer, Chihiro masters the Iai White Purity Style through imitation alone, studying practitioners like Yoji Uruha, Seiichi Samura, and his daughter Iori. Upon uncovering the truth of the Seitei War and his father's remorse over the Enchanted Blades' destructive nature, Chihiro realizes Enten's true purpose: to destroy the remaining Enchanted Blades.
Togo Shiba (柴 登吾, Shiba Tōgo)
Voiced by: Jun Fukushima (voiced comic), Katsuyuki Konishi (anime)
A highly skilled, very powerful sorcerer who specializes in teleportation. Shiba is a family friend of Chihiro and Kunishige, having grown up alongside the latter, and one of the few people who regularly visited the two, often taking Chihiro into town when Kunishige could not. Like Chihiro, he also seeks to avenge Kunishige. Before the Seitei War, he worked as a guardian for the Soga clan and was revered for his abilities even as a teenager. He joined the Kamunabi during the war but left sometime after Kunishige went into hiding. Though loud and somewhat childish despite his age, Shiba does his utmost to aid and protect Chihiro.
Hakuri Sazanami (漣 伯理, Sazanami Hakuri)
A disowned former member of the Sazanami clan, cast out for his perceived lack of ability. He allies with Chihiro to dismantle the Rakuzaichi black market operated by his family. Hakuri's initial inability to use the clan's signature Isou (威葬, Isō) technique stems from self-doubt caused by familial abuse, which unconsciously dispersed his spiritual energy. Upon mastering control of this energy, he gains the rare ability to wield both Isou and the Storehouse technique—a subspace for storing objects and people. Only one other clan member in history achieved this dual mastery. Hakuri can register individuals and their spiritually charged possessions in his Storehouse.
Iori Samura (座村 イヲリ, Samura Iori)
Iori Samura is the daughter of Enchanted Blade Bearer, Seiichi Samura. As a child, following her mother's death, she started living with her father and began training in swordsmanship. She endured constant bullying at school due to her father's involvement in the Seitei War. After a brief reconciliation, her father sends her away before entering Kamunabi protection, having the Masumi clan erase her memories of him to ensure she could live a normal life. The spell weakens due to her lingering attachment to her father and Tobimune's influence, finally breaking when she instinctively protects a classmate—unleashing her latent Iai White Purity Style swordsmanship. To be fully effective with her swordsmanship, Iori closes her eyes in combat.
Hinao (ヒナオ)
Voiced by: Akari Tadano (voiced comic), Miku Itō (anime)
A friend of Shiba and owner of Cafe Haru Haru (喫茶ハルハル, Kissa Haru Haru), which serves as both a cafe and a way for Hinao to connect sorcerers with the leaders of the yakuza or big corporations who require their services.
Char Kyonagi (鏡凪 シャル, Kyōnagi Sharu)
Voiced by: Miyari Nemoto
Char is a young orphan who was a captive of the crime boss and weapons dealer Sojo. Char is the last of the Kyonagi clan, known for their regenerative abilities. Sojo experimented on her abilities to help stabilize the Datenseki. While she can heal from nearly any wound, Char can also use her ability to heal wounds in others.

=== Kamunabi ===
The Kamunabi (神奈備) is a government agency of sorcerers formed during the Seitei War (斉廷戦争, Seitei Sensō) to combat threats endangering Japan as a whole, unlike civilian sorcerers who handle smaller-scale conflicts. Its origins trace back to the Sorcery Bureau (魔術局, Yojutsu-kyoku), a government sorcery-focused division that existed before the Seitei War before it was reorganized into the Counter-Sorcery Army (対魔術軍, Tai Majutsu-Gun), a military force that was organized in countering sorcerers from the hostile island nation of Shokoku. The Kamunabi's current priority is securing the Enchanted Blades. For three years, they have been locked in conflict with the Hishaku, who possess the blades but cannot wield them due to preexisting contracts with its wielders. The Kamunabi safeguards the blades' rightful bearers, preventing the Hishaku from exploiting their power.

==== Leaders ====
Kasen (嘉仙)
The long-bearded director of the Kamunabi, Kasen is a stoic leader and one of the agency's most skilled and powerful sorcerers, particularly in learned arts like barrier and sealing techniques. Alongside Ichiki and Yatsuru, he sealed the Shinuchi away after the Seitei War. He laments the Kamunabi's inability to command respect from the preexisting major sorcery clans and believes that the path to peace lies in using the Enchanted Blades to create order. With this goal in mind, he conspired with the Hishaku and leaked Kunishige's location.
Ichiki (壱鬼)
One of the highest-ranking heads of the Kamunabi, the elderly Ichiki is a wizened sorcerer of smaller stature, proficient in both learned sorcery and physical combat. He trained Shiba and Azami during the Seitei War and, after its conclusion, helped seal the Shinuchi and find a hiding place for Kunishige.
Yatsuru (夜弦)
A high-ranking member and the sole woman among the Kamunabi's leaders, Yatsuru is a master of barrier and sealing sorcery, a skill she shares with colleagues Kasen and Ichiki. She was instrumental in sealing the Shinuchi.
Soshiro Azami (薊 奏士郎, Azami Sōshirō)
Voiced by: Yuichi Nakamura
The strongest of the Kamunabi heads and an old friend of Kunishige and Shiba. He helped Kunishige find a hidden place to reside following the Seitei War and later served as a prominent informant to Chihiro. Though usually cool and collected, he holds strong loyalty for Chihiro and Shiba, and a immense hatred for the Hishaku and those who orchestrated Kunishige's assassination. His sorcery, Coin (己印, Koin), allows him to manifest and control coins. His family originally used this ability at their clinic for its stimulating properties, but Azami adapted the sorcery for combat, earning his father's ire. He acts as an executioner for the Kamunabi, decimating opponents with brute force.
Izaru (亥猿)
One of the Kamunabi's leaders, with distinctive mutton chops. He criticized some leaders for being responsible for Kunishige's whereabouts, blamed him for stealing the Enchanted Blades, and distrusted Chihiro. His sorcery lets him create large, rosary-like chains of beads and control them to restrict a target.
Kudo (区堂, Kudō)
One of the heads of the Kamunabi who wears a gas mask-like apparatus on his face and always keeps one eye closed. Like Azami, he supported Kunishige and helped hide him after the end of the Seitei War. His sorcery, Warrior's Path (士透, Shitō) allows him to send someone in a certain direction, even through walls and floors. He sacrifices himself protecting Hakuri during the Hishaku assault on Kamunabi headquarters.

==== Employees ====
Hiyuki Kagari (香刈 緋雪, Kagari Hiyuki)
An elite fighter of the Kamunabi, stated to be its strongest. She is stated to be one of the few individuals capable of opposing an Enchanted Blade by wielding a special sorcery called the Flame Bone of the Starving (餓者の炎骨, Gasha no Enkotsu), which is said to possess strength on par with the Enchanted Blades. She has an intense personality and a short temper, but a kind heart beneath her fiery exterior, which sometimes runs counter to her orders.
Tafuku Mihara (美原 多福, Mihara Tafuku)
Hiyuki's partner who looks like a sumo wrestler. His sorcery creates a separate domain where two combatants fight, and the domain disappears once the battle is over. Tafuku is nonchalant and calm, contrasting Hiyuki's boisterousness. Though they begin as enemies, he quickly comes to respect Chihiro.
Fushimi (伏見)
An elite Kamunabi fighter and member of the Kokugoku Steam Squad stationed at the Kokugoku Hot Spring Sanso fortress, assigned to protect Uruha. Fushimi wears a bandana and uses a sorcery ability called Smoke Axe (煙斧, Yān fǔ), which allows him to cut opponents with smoke between his hands. When the Hishaku's hired Datenseki-powered troops attack Kokugoku, Fushimi and the rest of the squad defeat them. However, he and his comrades would later be killed by Hiruhiko.
Kiri Shirakai (白廻 斬, Shirakai Kiri)
An elite swordswoman and Kamunabi squadron leader. She is the granddaughter of Itsuo Shirakai, founder of the Iai White Purity Style. Raised in part by Shirakai's students Yoji Uruha and Seiichi Samura, she rejects her grandfather's belief that women cannot master swordsmanship, swearing to decapitate him to prove her skill. She wields an oversized odachi—two meters long and five shaku in blade length—compensating for its weight and size with precise balance and fluid, dance-like movements.
Natsuki Misaka (巳坂奈ツ基, Misaka Natsuki)
An elite swordsman and Kamunabi squadron leader. The younger brother of Ibuki Misaka and bearer of the Enchanted Blade Cloud Gouger, he fought alongside Ibuki, their combined skill making them nearly unstoppable in battle. Though once a candidate to wield the Enchanted Blade Kumeyuri, Yoji Uruha was chosen instead. This, in part, has led Natsuki to resent Uruha and drives him to seek equal recognition as a swordsman alongside his brother and the other sword bearers. After the Seitei War, Ibuki retired from swordsmanship, while Natsuki continued training. He now seeks to confront the Hishaku to avenge his brother's death. His sorcery, Lightning Menace (雷躯, Raiku), allows him to imbue his movements and attacks with lightning.

===== Anti-Cloud Gouger Special Forces =====
The Anti-Cloud Gouger Special Forces (対クラウドガウガー特殊部隊, Tai Kuraudo Gaugā Tokushu Butai) was a squadron of six elite fighters within the Kamunabi who were tasked with opposing Genichi Sojo and the Enchanted Blade Cloud Gouger he wielded. Only two survived the battle against Sojo.

Ikuto Hagiwara (萩原 幾兎, Hagiwara Ikuto)
The commander of the Anti-Cloud Gouger Special Forces, he possesses a sorcery called Jikai (磁戒), which lets him use magnetic forces around him. He is one of only two in the squadron to survive the battle with Sojo, though he lost both legs. The deaths of his veteran squadmates, including his childhood friend Kugara, caused him psychological trauma, leading Hagiwara to hallucinate that Kugara is still alive and speaking to him. Despite this, Ikuto can help defend Kamunabi HQ against the Hishaku.
Hajime Kugara (具柄 一, Kugara Hajime)
A mask-wearing member of the Anti-Cloud Gouger Special Forces whose spell allows him to imbue his body with iron-like properties. Kugara was Hagiwara's childhood friend since they were five years old. An entity resembling Kugara, wearing his signature mask, has appeared alongside Hagiwara after Kugara's death.
Kazane Machi (真智 カザネ, Machi Kazane)
The most recent member of the Anti-Cloud Gouger Special Forces. He is only one of two in the squadron to survive against Sojo. His sorcery, Demon Monster (怪魑, Kaichi) was considered the team's secret weapon against Sojo. However, Sojo would incapacitate Kazane before he could activate it by severing his right arm.
Shiyumi Harima (張間 梓弓, Harima Shiyumi)
A member of the Anti-Cloud Gouger Special Forces whose spell Gansui (岩垂) lets her control and reshape stone.
Kiyohiko Uzuki (卯月 清彦, Uzuki Kiyohiko)
A member of the Anti-Cloud Gouger Special Forces who can use binding spells to restrict the target's movements.
Makoto Kasahara (笠原 誠, Kasahara Makoto)
A member of the Anti-Cloud Gouger Special Forces who can increase the size of his hands.

===== Masumi =====
The Masumi (巻墨) are a ninja clan loyal to the Kamunabi, known for their willingness to die for their master. Three members—Ro, Moku, and Sumi—guard Seiichi Samura at Senkutsuji Temple after Kunishige Rokuhira's death. When the Hishaku attack, they suppress sound and scent to aid Samura, who fights using his keen sense of hearing. Though prepared to sacrifice themselves for his escape, Samura refuses and later rescues them, releasing them from service. After his betrayal, they join Chihiro to oppose Samura and protect his daughter Iori in "Operation: Easy Does It".

Ro (郎, Rō)
The leader of the Masumi who, despite being over 23 years old, looks like a child and is mistaken for one by Chihiro and Iori. Ro dislikes being treated like a kid, but is not opposed to using his appearance to his advantage to try to skip work. During his time at Senkutsuji, he seems to have adopted a persona similar to Samura, mimicking his signature sunglasses, eating candy cigarettes, using the term "get fired up" as a catchphrase, and adopting a similarly blunt demeanor. After the attack on Senkutsuji, Ro visits Chihiro in his hospital room and explains that he and the other Masumi will look out for Chihiro, per Hakuri's request.
Moku (杢)
A tall ninja who meets Hakuri and Uruha at the train station alongside Sumi and helps rally Senkutsuji's troops when the Hishaku attack. He, like the other Masumi, is deeply empathetic, and takes care of Chihiro when he begins to doubt or be overly critical of himself, be it through reminding him of their mission or by forcibly shutting him up with some food.
Sumi (炭)
A kunoichi with a cross-shaped tattoo on the right side of her face. Sumi meets Hakuri and Uruha at the train station to transport them to Senkutsuji Temple using a transportation mandala she can create with a marker. Upon arriving there, Sumi tends to Hakuri's treatment to hasten the safe use of the Storehouse before joining Samura and the other clan members in battle against the Hishaku. During Operation: Easy Does It, Sumi makes off with Iori on a motorcycle as Kuguri gives chase.

=== Enchanted Blade Bearers ===
The Enchanted Blade Bearers, or commonly known as Sword Bearers (所有者(しょゆうしゃ), Shoyūsha), are elite sword fighters personally selected by Kunishige Rokuhira to wield his blades during the Seitei War. Their combat prowess secured Japan's victory against the island nation skilled in wielding the Datenseki, Shokoku, earning them public acclaim as war heroes. However, in truth, the Sword Master unleashed Malediction and committed genocide against the island inhabinants of Shokoku despite their surrender, the details of which remain unknown to the public. After the conflict, they went into hiding for safety. When Kunishige and the bearer Ibuki Misaka are killed by the Hishaku, the Kamunabi placed the survivors under heavy guard.

Yoji Uruha (漆羽 洋児, Uruha Yōji)
The original bearer of the blade Kumeyuri (酌揺) during the Seitei War, Uruha is a prodigy who greatly admires Kunishige and feels honored to have been chosen. He initially refuses to believe Kunishige has a son and loses his will to live after the swordsmith's death, but later reaffirms his loyalty to the Rokuhira family upon meeting Chihiro. Trained in the Iai White Purity Style by fellow bearer Seiichi Samura, he masters the style by age 16. He is apparently killed by Samura after the latter's betrayal, but is later revealed to be alive when he protects Hakuri from Hishaku assassins; with his Eternal Contract severed, he regains access to his original sorcery, Crimson Recital (紅演, Koen), which boosts his physical attributes.
Seiichi Samura (座村 清市, Samura Seiichi)
A devout Buddhist and the original bearer of Tobimune (飛宗), Samura blinded himself to sharpen his senses, mastering the Iai White Purity Style and fighting through echolocation with his sheathed blade. He is considered the fastest of the Blade Bearers. Plagued by remorse for his role in the Seitei War and the Sword Master's crimes, he temporarily allies with the Hishaku to eliminate his fellow bearers, extracting Hishaku's secrets in return to atone for their crimes. Though he appears to kill his student, Yoji Uruha, his true intent is to break Uruha's curse by reviving him with Tobimune's power. Determined to prevent the Malediction from occurring again, he erases memories of himself from his daughter, Iori, for her safety. After regaining his sight after his battle with Chihiro, he joins forces with Chihiro, Iori, and the Masumi. Believing Chihiro will one day right the wrongs of their past, Samura sacrifices himself in a duel against Akemura Soga, allowing Chihiro to escape. After his death, Tobimune was left under his daughter's care, Iori.
Ibuki Misaka (巳坂 伊武基, Misaka Ibuki)
The original bearer of the blade Cloud Gouger (刳雲, Kuregumo), Ibuki was a peerless swordsman regarded as equal in skill to Seiichi Samura and an outlaw biker criminal. In his youth, he was ferocious in his hometown of Kitakyushu. He was close with his younger brother, Natsuki, but he became distant from Natsuki after he murdered their father to protect him. His sorcery manipulates lightning. Ibuki's actions put him at odds with the Sorcery Bureau. Following the Seitei War, Ibuki abandoned swordsmanship and lost the will to fight. He was assassinated by Hokuto of the Hishaku shortly after Kunishige Rokuhira was murdered.
Subaru Urita (瓜田 すば琉, Urita Subaru)
An older man, an Enchanted Blade Bearer, and Kunishige's mentor. He wears a hachimaki, sports a mustache, and has a scar over his right eye. Before the Seitei War, Subaru was considered one of Japan's most prolific swordsmiths, but his primary occupation and passion is being a sushi chef, owning his own restaurant, "Sushi Subaru". He is also a master swordsman who practices the Sand-Bone One-Sword Style. Shortly after meeting Kunishige, Subaru took a liking to him and became his mentor, helping him forge the Enchanted Blades. When the Hishaku attacked the surviving blade bearers' Kamunabi-guarded locations, Subaru was relocated for his protection. Subaru's sorcery allows him to duplicate himself several times.

=== Soga clan ===
The Soga clan was Japan's most influential sorcerer clan for many centuries before the Seitei War, with a female member in each generation capable of foresight. As such, the Soga clan has predicted threats or significant events affecting the nation for millennia, and it holds great sway over the government and other sorcerer clans.

Chiaki Soga (曽我 千晃, Soga Chiaki)
Chihiro's mother and the holder of the Princess Soga (曽我の姫, Soga no Hime) title, possessing the ability of foresight. Initially born into a lower branch of the Soga clan, she and her younger brother, Akemura, are elevated when her ability manifests after her predecessor from the clan's main branch died without bearing any children. Foresight sorcery is hereditary among the clan's female members, said to prove the prophetess is descended from the goddess Izanami. Chiaki's foresight gives the Soga significant influence with the Japanese government. She is romantically involved with Kunishige.
Hiroto Soga (曽我 昼音, Soga Hiroto)
An elite swordsman, sorcerer, and head of the Soga clan. Stoic and calm, Hiroto is the sole user of the Soga's Kurotsuchi, a sorcery that manipulates directional gravity. With this he can levitate himself or crush his opponents with immense weight. With his sorcery and incredible speed, Hiroto was considered one of the strongest fighters before the Seitei War. He was killed in battle on Irishima by Ariu Mikaboshi.
Yoshinojo Soga (曽我 義之丞, Soga Yoshinojo)
An elite, older swordsman of the Soga clan with a distinctive mustache and beard. Unlike his stoic and calm relative Hiroto, Yoshinojo is cocky and eager, usually sporting a confident grin. Despite this, he is an experienced, unrelenting fighter. He was killed in battle on Irishima by Ariu Mikaboshi.
Giyu Soga (曽我 義勇, Soga Giyū)
Hiroto's ambitious younger brother and original bearer of the first prototype tantō Enchanted Blade Koyoi (枯夜). He is next in line to become the head of the Soga clan. Driven by a singular desire to "restore the Soga clan" and maintain dominance over the other clans, Giyu seizes every opportunity to consolidate power, whether it means giving Chiaki to Mikaboshi or supporting the Enchanted Blade Project so that he can wield a blade himself.

=== Antagonists ===
Akemura Soga (曽我 明無良, Soga Akemura)
Known as the Sword Master (剣聖, Kensei), Akemura is the strongest Enchanted Blade wielder and is eternally bound to Magatsumi (勾罪)—also called the Shinuchi (真打), the strongest of the six Enchanted Blades. He is also Chihiro's maternal uncle, Chiaki Soga's younger brother, and Kunishige's brother-in-law. Akemura was considered to be Kunishige's most trusted ally and friend and fought in the Seitei War. After the war ended, a peace treaty was signed by Japan and the Mikaboshi, but Akemura refused to honor the peace treaty and chose to believe that it was his duty to eradicate the Mikaboshi and every single inhabinant of Shokoku and use his technique, Malediction, to slaughter 200,000 innocent civilians in a horrendous genocide. Afterward, he turned himself in and was incarcerated by the Kamunabi, who covered up the atrocity. He has a telepathic link with Magatsumi, allowing him to control anyone who possesses the sheathed blade. A cursed contract ties the other bearers' lives to his—if he dies, they die as well. Despite being declared insane because of his actions, Akemura is still mentally competent, claiming he made his choices based on his beliefs and ideals to protect Japan. After possessing Yura's body, Akemura killed Seiichi Samura, broke Enten, and severely wounded Chihiro, forcing him into hiding. He took command of the Kamunabi, preparing to lead them in protecting Japan.

==== Hishaku ====
The Hishaku (毘灼) are a secretive group of ten elite criminal sorcerers who murdered Kunishige Rokuhira and stole his six Enchanted Blades. Recognizable by flame-emblem tattoos, they wield fire-based teleportation sorcery. Allied with criminal underworld factions like the Korogumi Yakuza and the Sazanami clan, they spend three years preparing to target the Kamunabi fortresses to sever bearers' contracts. Though forming a truce with Seiichi Samura, the Hishaku anticipate his betrayal, attacking the Kamunabi's Tokyo headquarters while others attempt to kidnap his daughter. They later exploit Kamunabi personnel who have been blackmailed to destabilize the organization.

Yura (幽)
The leader of the Hishaku and the man who orchestrated the group's murder of Kunishige and theft of his Enchanted Blades as part of an attempt to wield the Shinuchi for himself. Because of his status and actions, he is Chihiro's arch-nemesis and, as such, his primary target for revenge. Yura also visited Samura at his house to make a contract with him in exchange for information, soon after the Hishaku's raid on the Rokuhiras' residence. He is always calm and has strong confidence in his plans, even risking his life on a simple coin flip because he believes God is on his side. Yura initially planned to kill the Sword Master in order to wield the Shinuchi. However, after speaking with Akemura Soga, he changed his mind and decided to work with him to achieve their seemingly similar goals. He had a fiancée at one point in his life, though she died for unknown reasons. After being gravely wounded in his battle against Chihiro, Yura allowed Akemura to possess his body.
Hokuto (北兜)
A cunning swordsman who dresses in samurai clothing. His sorcery involves controlling an armored puppet resembling himself and manipulating individual pieces of armor for defense, but he prides himself on his proficiency with a sword. Through his sorcery, he took part in the murder of Kunishige Rokuhira. He also assassinated Enchanted Blade Bearer Ibuki Misaka, though he was left disappointed as Misaka was a shadow of himself compared to during the Seitei War. Hokuto believes his sword does not exist for survival, but for the thrill of a deadly battle, and seeks out strong fighters like Yoji Uruha to satisfy his desire for mortal combat.
Uran (右嵐)
A practitioner of ice manipulation sorcery, she generates and controls ice. Her breath can freeze and restrain opponents. She took part in the murder of Kunishige Rokuhira.
Bingo (瓶伍)
A man who uses a sorcery called Mako (魔咬, Demon Bite), Bingo creates lion dancer heads, or "lucky charms", of varying sizes. These constructs possess massive mouths with great destructive force. While easily destroyed, an invisible, cumulative force weighs down on whoever destroys them. Bingo can also transform his own head into such a charm, allowing him to consume corpses to fuel his sorcery. This process inevitably makes him sleepy after each consumption.
Yukisada (幸禎)
A 17-year-old sorcerer who is said to be the strongest fighter among the Hishaku by Yura. His primary sorcery grants him powerful regenerative capabilities, enabling him to survive even decapitation. He became a Vessel, enabling him to manipulate the Kamunabi headquarters' barrier system to prevent outside threats from entering.
Hiruhiko (昼彦)
A battle-driven young man who developed lethal instincts as a child after killing an assailant at age three. He rejects conventional combat methods, relying instead on his raw, instinctive style. Tasked with assassinating Uruha, he crosses paths with Chihiro, recognizing their shared traits—both are 18-year-old prodigies hardened by years of combat. His sorcery, Blood Crane (血鶴, Chizuru), allows him to conjure and control razor-sharp origami capable of impaling foes or lifting massive objects like Datenseki fragments. After Uruha's apparent demise, he wields Kumeyuri, adapting to a unique two-handed sword style despite losing his sorcery. Later, he joins Kuguri and Toto in Kyoto to capture Iori, leading to a rematch with Chihiro, but he is defeated again. He ultimately loses Kumeyuri to Samura.
Kuguri (久々李)
A ruthless swordsman who thrives in battle and scorns those who treat swordsmanship frivolously. He carries an Enchanted Blade, pursuing a deeper connection with it despite lacking a formal contract—a state he describes as "unrequited love". His sorcery, Twilight Wave (破暮, Hagure), absorbs and stores kinetic energy and heat from his movements indefinitely, later releasing it in explosive bursts proportional to the accumulated power. Since the ability requires time to build, he often relies solely on his katana in combat. Tasked with capturing Iori alongside Toto, he tracks her to Kyoto and engages Chihiro. Initially unimpressed, he abandons his mission upon witnessing Chihiro's improvised Iai White Purity Style, consumed by battle frenzy.
Toto (斗斗)
A young woman whose sorcery allows her to track individuals and extract information through their blood, Toto accompanies Kuguri on the mission to kidnap Iori. She locates the target using a blood sample taken from Samura during the attack on Senkutsuji. At the Kyoto Bloodshed Hotel, she uses blood from Sengoku's severed head to confirm the presence of Chihiro and Iori. Toto frequently employs the Hishaku's collective flame teleportation to rescue comrades from peril, a tactic that aligns with her tendency to avoid direct confrontation.

==== Sazanami clan ====
The Sazanami clan (漣家, Sazanami-ke) is a powerful criminal clan of sorcerers who are the proprietors of the Rakuzaichi, an annual auction of black market artifacts and weapons, as well as people, which serves as a highly popular fixture in the Japanese underworld, and has administered this auction for over 200 years.

Kyora Sazanami (漣 京羅, Sazanami Kyōra)
The eleventh head of the Sazanami clan, the lead auctioneer of the Rakuzaichi, and Hakuri's strict father. As clan head, Kyora controls a subspace called the Storehouse (蔵, Kura). In this subspace, he can store items and even people, and control the environment. Kyora has dedicated himself to ensuring that the Rakuzaichi auction continues, no matter the cost, even willing to sacrifice his own children. After being mortally wounded by Chihiro, Kyora is ultimately killed by the overwhelming power of the Shinuchi. Kyora's death forever ends the Rakuzaichi and forces the Sazanami into hiding.

===== The Tou =====
The Tou (濤, Tō), also known as the Special Defense Corp (特別防衛隊, Tokubetsu Bōei-Tai), is a small group of the Sazanami clan's four best fighters. Their duties are to follow the clan head's commands and protect the Rakuzaichi.

Soya Sazanami (漣 宗也, Sazanami Sōya)
Hakuri's obsessive older brother and heir apparent to the Sazanami clan leadership. Typically composed, he becomes emotionally unstable regarding Hakuri, expressing twisted affection through physical abuse. Though once envious of his brother Tenri's superior sorcery, Soya later fixates entirely on Hakuri, whom the clan considers untalented. Initially demanding Hakuri's return to the clan, Soya resolves to kill him after learning of his alliance with Chihiro. Their final confrontation ends with Hakuri mastering Isou and the Storehouse space to defeat Soya. After the auction building was destroyed, Soya arose from the rubble with amnesia. However, he quickly deduced his identity as a Sazanami. Unable to remember his defeat at the hands of Hakuri, he seeks answers and rediscovers his love for harming the weak.
Tenri Sazanami (漣 天理, Sazanami Tenri)
Hakuri's younger brother who is highly dedicated in protecting his father and the Rakuzaichi, and was one of the three members of the Tou who confronted Chihiro and Shiba when the later infiltrated the Sazanami estate. Tenri specializes in using short-bladed weapons for combat. During the fight against Chihiro, Tenri uses a Datenseki tool to amplify his sorcery in a desperate attempt to make his father proud. Because the Datenseki is unstable, the power overwhelms Tenri and kills him.
Tamaki Sazanami (漣 珠紀, Sazanami Tamaki)
Hakuri's older sister, one of three members of the Tou who confronted Chihiro and Shiba when the latter two infiltrated the Sazanami estate. When questioned about Soya's whereabouts by Kyora during this event, Tamaki lies and says he is not feeling well, but Tenri corrects him, saying he is looking for Hakuri.
Enji Sazanami (漣 円慈, Sazanami Enji)
One of Hakuri's older brothers, and one of the three members of the Tou who confronted Chihiro and Shiba when the latter two infiltrated the Sazanami estate. Despite begging Shiba for death after Tenri's demise, Shiba tells him to live in order to foster the remaining Sazanami clan members to prevent another tragedy like Tenri's from happening again.

==== Mikaboshi clan ====
The Mikaboshi (箕加星) were an ancient and powerful clan of sorcerers who once ruled Japan over a thousand years ago. They were ultimately usurped and driven to Shokoku Island by the Soga clan. Nearly destroyed by Ukizane Soga, the Mikaboshi king harnessed the power of the Datenseki to construct an enormous, spherical habitat deep beneath the ocean, crafted from immense branches, ensuring the Mikaboshi's survival. Since then, the Mikaboshi and their fellow inhabitants have adapted to the Datenseki's unstable power, enabling them to harness it for their sorcery. Following an earthquake that unearthed Datenseki on Irishima Island, the Mikaboshi returned from Shokoku Island to claim Irishima and parts of Japan with the mineral. The royal family's aggressive actions led to the Seitei War against Japan. The Mikaboshi gained the upper hand early in the war, but the emergence of the Enchanted Blades turned the tide against them. Shokoku's citizens then overthrew the royal family, and a peace treaty was agreed upon, ending the Seitei War. However, 200,000 civilians were killed during Akemura Soga's genocidal attack on Shokoku via the Malediction.

Ariu Mikaboshi (亜利雨 箕加星)
Ariu, the crown prince of the Mikaboshi clan, is a powerful sorcerer who can use the Datenseki and is one of the clan's six guardians. His sorcery, Sumika (栖), allows him to manipulate insect-like constructs. He can also poison the air around his enemies, dulling their senses. With the power of the Datenseki, Ariu can strengthen his body to superhuman levels, allowing him to withstand any sorcery attacks.
Shurin Mikaboshi (守利无 箕加星)
Shurin is an albino prince of the Mikaboshi clan and one of the clan's six guardians, and Ariu's little brother. Due to his unusual appearance for a Mikaboshi of his pure-blooded nature, however, Shurin has felt a great shame regarding his appearance and repeatedly hides it around his comrades, the other guardians. He has shown a determination to prove his bloodline through his actions, gathering extensive knowledge of the Sorcery Bureau. He can also use Sumika and a sort of shapeshifting sorcery.
Ra Mikaboshi (螺 箕加星)
Ra is a tall and slender young sorcerer of the Mikaboshi clan and one of the clan's six guardians. She can also use Sumika. Like all members of the Mikaboshi, she is able to use the immense power of Datenshi to strengthen herself and even levitate mid-air.
Zukon Mikaboshi (不昆 箕加星)
Zukon is a gleeful sorcerer of the Mikaboshi clan and one of the clan's six guardians. He wears a black diamond hat visor. He can also use Sumika. Like all members of the Mikaboshi, he is able to use the immense power of Datenseki without fear of backlash. By using Datenseki, Zukon can levitate himself mid-air.
Yukifu Mikaboshi (行浮 箕加星)
Yukifu is a loyal and overconfident sorcerer of the Mikaboshi clan and one of the clan's six guardians. He can also use Sumika and the Datenseki's power to strengthen himself or levitate.
Bansoro Mikaboshi (万其郎 箕加星)
Bansoro is a cool and composed sorcerer of the Mikaboshi clan and one of the clan's six guardians. He wears a distinctive pointed rebreather mask, which resembles a gas mask, which emits black gas. Like all members of the guardians, he can use Sumika, and as a Mikaboshi, he can also harness the Datenseki's power.

==== Others ====
Genichi Sojo (双城 厳一, Sōjō Gen'ichi)
A criminal arms dealer who wielded the stolen Enchanted Blade Cloud Gouger (刳雲, Kuregumo). Obsessed with replicating Datenseki-based weapons, he kidnaps Char and her mother to stabilize experiments with their regeneration powers.

Norisaku Madoka (円 法炸, Madoka Norisaku)
Also known as the Daruma Sorcerer, he is a sorcerer employed by Sojo, who wields the ability to create exploding Daruma using his spirit energy. After his defeat at the hands of Chihiro and Shiba, Norisaku decided to stop being a sorcerer and go straight with his life. While trying to reconcile with his family, Norisaku is killed by Sojo for revealing information to Chihiro and Shiba.
Shigyu Brothers (死柳兄弟, Shigyu Kyōdai)
Two powerful sorcerers hired by the Hishaku to attack the Kamunabi's Tokyo headquarters, though they joined solely to wreak havoc. Despite their ordinary origins, they killed eleven Kamunabi personnel before entering Level 1's underground core with a Hishaku member. There, they clashed with Azami, who swiftly killed them both.

=== Other characters ===
Kunishige Rokuhira (六平 国重, Rokuhira Kunishige)
Voiced by: Kenta Fujimaki (voiced comic), Tomokazu Seki (anime)
Chihiro's father and the famous blacksmith who forged the Enchanted Blades. He was also the husband of Chiaki Soga, the Princess Soga of the Soga clan, and Akemura Soga's brother-in-law. Before the Seitei War, he was already a swordsmith, but because he was selective about who he sold his weapons to, he barely made enough to survive. He also believed in the philosophy of swords being used to defeat evil and protect the weak. Thanks to his unique vision, he stabilized the Datenseki, the volatile ore used to create the Enchanted Blades. His blades ended the Seitei War; however, when Akemura Soga used the Malediction on Shokoku Island and commit genocide, Kunishige confiscated all six blades and went into hiding, eventually fathering Chihiro. Guilty over the deaths and destruction the blades caused and from Akemura's actions, Kunishige and his son Chihiro crafted a seventh blade, Enten, for one purpose: to destroy the Enchanted Blades. Fifteen years after the war, he was assassinated by the Hishaku, and his blades were stolen. His death became a catalyst for Chihiro's pursuit to retrieve the Enchanted Blades and take vengeance against the Hishaku.
Shuji Mashiro (真城 秀治, Mashiro Shūji)
A young sorcerer who served as Shiba's partner in the Sorcery Bureau before the Seitei War. After a mission to retrieve stolen Datenseki, Mashiro accompanies Shiba to visit Kunishige to get his opinion on the ore, a course of action he strongly opposes. When he turned 18, Shiba gifted him a sword Kunishige made. His sorcery, Akuu (空亜, Akū), involves manipulating air pressure and its intensity. This enables him to wield weapons hands-free and generate air-pressure-based slash attacks. He was killed by Ariu Mikaboshi on Irishima in battle after negotiations failed.
Shinsaku Hasumi (蓮水 晋作, Hasumi Shinsaku)
A high-ranking member of the Sorcery Bureau prior to the Seitei War. In charge of a secret Datenseki research laboratory, Hasumi was Shiba's superior. Though unsure at first, Hasumi comes to understand Kunishige's skill, going as far as supporting the Enchanted Blade Project. Disillusioned with the Sorcery Bureau's political machinations and accepting the Mikaboshi's demands for a ceasefire, Hasumi resigned after allowing Shiba to steal the Datenseki for Kunishige.
Joji (丈治)
A skilled swordsman for the Sorcery Bureau prior to the Seitei War. He sports an eyemask and a nose ring. He works under high-ranking member Hasumi, stationed at a secret Datenseki research laboratory. He is ranked above Shiba and Mashiro, and is annoyed by Shiba's insubordinate antics.
Yuu Inazuma (稲妻 裕, Inazuma Yū)
Yuu, or Mr. Inazuma, as he refers to himself, is a child aiming to break into the Rakuzaichi Black Market auction to free his big sister, which leads to his encounter with Chihiro. Yuu reunites with his sister after Chihiro rescued her and the other hostages from the Rakuzaichi.
Ikura (井倉)
Iori's classmate and friend who sits next to her at school. He fancied himself a loner because his classmates ignored him for his strange personality, but he became friends with Iori after she was kind to him. After the Hishaku's attack on their school, Ikura trails Toto to the Kyoto Bloodshed Hotel in order to try and help Iori. His involvement leads Iori to remember everything and reawaken her swordsmanship.
Itsuo Shirakai (白廻逸夫, Shirakai Itsuo)
A master swordsman and creator of the Iai White Purity Style, a swordsmanship technique developed in pursuit of unmatched speed. His unconventional methodology initially draws ridicule from fellow swordsmen, but he later proves its lethal efficacy by defeating his detractors. Among his most prominent disciples are Seiichi Samura and Yoji Uruha. Despite his status as a maverick, he holds deeply misogynistic views, believing women are ill-suited for carrying a sword. He directs these beliefs toward his granddaughter Kiri, causing her to resolve to destroy both him and his style. Though still alive, Shirakai has cut contact with his former students and now lives in the mountains, communicating with Kiri only through text.
Yojiro Sengoku (戦国与次郎, Sengoku Yojiro)
The general manager of the Kyoto Bloodshed Hotel who provides Chihiro, Iori, and the Masumi a place of respite following their encounter with Kuguri. Sengoku is a master of the Reigen One–Sword Style, which he taught to all of the hotel's employees.

== Media ==
=== Manga ===
Written and illustrated by Takeru Hokazono, Kagurabachi began serialization in Shueisha's shōnen manga magazine Weekly Shōnen Jump on September 19, 2023. The first tankōbon volume was released on February 2, 2024. As of September 4, 2026, 12 volumes have been released.

Viz Media and Shueisha's Manga Plus platform are publishing the series in English. In March 2024, Viz Media announced the print release of the manga. The first volume was released on November 5, 2024.

==== Volumes ====
No.	Original release date	Original ISBN	English release date	English ISBN
1	February 2, 2024	978-4-08-883819-9	November 5, 2024	978-1-9747-4724-5
1. "Mission" ("すべきこと", Subeki Koto); 2. "Heaps" (累累, Ruirui); 3. "Witness" (目撃者, Mokugekisha); 4. "Sorcery and the Enchanted Blade" (妖術と妖刀, Yōjutsu to Yōtō); 5. "A Good Meal" (ごちそう, Gochisō); 6. "Peace" (平穏, Heion); 7. "Smoke Signal" (狼煙, Noroshi); 8. "Norisaku Madoka: I Will Change" (円 法炸 〜俺は変わるんだ〜, Madoka Norisaku: Ore wa Kawarunda)
Chihiro Rokuhira is the son of Kunishige Rokuhira, a master swordsmith who created six Enchanted Blades crucial to ending the Seitei War. When the criminal sorcerer group Hishaku murders Kunishige and steals the blades, Chihiro wields a seventh blade, Enten, and seeks vengeance. Accompanied by family friend Togo Shiba, he travels to Tokyo after reports of a stolen blade's sighting. There, they meet Char Kyonagi, a young girl who claims knowledge of the weapon. Though skeptical, they confirm her story when attacked by Norisaku Madoka, a sorcerer working for crime lord Genichi Sojo, who possesses the stolen Cloud Gouger. After defeating Madoka, Chihiro learns Char is the last of the Kyonagi clan, a lineage hunted for their regenerative healing abilities. They are rescued by Azami, a government sorcerer from the Kamunabi organization and an old ally of Kunishige. Azami reveals another blade, Shinuchi, will appear at the black-market auction Rakuzaichi, but warns Chihiro against confronting Sojo. As Shiba departs to answer a Kamunabi summons, Sojo—having executed Madoka for betrayal—launches another assault on Chihiro and Char.
2	May 2, 2024	978-4-08-883880-9	February 4, 2025	978-1-9747-5271-3
9. "Enten vs. Cloud Gouger" (淵天vs(バーサス)刳雲, Enten Bāsasu Kuregumo); 10. "Swift" (サクッっと, Sakutto); 11. "Awaken" (目覚め, Mezame); 12. "Preparations" (支度, Shitaku); 13. "Elite" (精鋭, Seiei); 14. "True Realm" (本領, Honryō); 15. "Food" (飯, Meshi); 16. "Silence" (沈黙, Chinmoku); 17. "Tea" (茶, Cha); 18. "Roar" (轟く, Todoroku)
Sojo overpowers Chihiro and captures Char. While recovering in a hospital, Chihiro encounters the Anti-Cloud Gouger Special Forces, a Kamunabi unit dedicated to countering Sojo and his stolen blade. They devise a strategy: the squad will confront Sojo directly while Chihiro infiltrates his stronghold to rescue Char. Sojo intends to weaponize the unstable Datenseki, believing Char's regenerative abilities can stabilize the volatile material. As Sojo departs his compound, the ACG squad ambushes him, leading to a fierce battle. Meanwhile, Chihiro successfully retrieves Char. Though Sojo defeats most of the squad, leaving only two survivors, Chihiro challenges him to a final duel. Despite losing an arm, Chihiro emerges victorious, shattering Cloud Gouger in the process. In a last act of defiance, Sojo merges his sorcery with the Datenseki, triggering a catastrophic explosion that consumes both him and his compound.
3	July 4, 2024	978-4-08-884116-8	May 6, 2025	978-1-9747-5478-6
19. "Knight of Darkness" (闇の騎士, Yami no Kishi); 20. "The Kamunabi's Weapon" (神奈備の武器, Kamunabi no Buki); 21. "Lukewarm" (微温い, Nurui); 22. "Deadlock" (拮抗, Kikkō); 23. "Storehouse" (蔵, Kura); 24. "Hunters" (狩人, Karyūdo); 25. "Deal" (取引, Torihiki); 26. "Confidence" (自信, Jishin); 27. "Mr. Inazuma" (Mr.(ミスター)イナズマ, Misutā Inazuma)
Following Sojo's death, the Shinuchi—Kunishige Rokuhira's masterpiece—is set for auction at the Rakuzaichi, overseen by the Sazanami crime family. Chihiro allies with Hakuri Sazanami, an exiled clan member seeking to dismantle the auction. Their plans are interrupted by Hiyuki Kagari, a Kamunabi operative wielding the Flame Bone of the Starving, a sorcery rivaling the Enchanted Blades. Chihiro evades her with Hakuri's assistance. Using Hakuri's intelligence, Chihiro and Togo Shiba infiltrate the Sazanami estate, confronting patriarch Kyora Sazanami. When their initial attempt to reclaim the Shinuchi fails, the Tou—the clan's elite enforcers—attack, forcing Chihiro to surrender Enten to spare Hakuri. Unbeknownst to the Sazanami, Chihiro retains remote control of Enten, using it to scout their Storehouse. On the day of the Rakuzaichi, Chihiro arrives with a restored right arm, wielding the fractured Cloud Gouger. His strategic maneuvering positions him to reclaim both Enten and the Shinuchi while destabilizing the Sazanami's operation.
4	October 4, 2024	978-4-08-884209-7	August 5, 2025	978-1-9747-5607-0
28. "Breach" (突破口, Toppakō); 29. "Selection" (取捨, Shusha); 30. "Intruders" (乱入者, Rannyūsha); 31. "Greeting" (挨拶, Aisatsu); 32. "Wall" (壁, Kabe); 33. "Defend to the Death" (死守, Shishu); 34. "Duty" (役目, Yakume); 35. "Cage" (檻, Ori); 36. "Geniuses" (天才達, Tensai-tachi); 37. "Equal" (対等, Taitō)
Chihiro, Shiba, and Hakuri infiltrate the Rakuzaichi venue to reach the Sazanami cemetery basement, where a magical portal to the Storehouse lies. Chihiro brokers a truce with Hiyuki to stop the auction and secure Shinuchi, while Hakuri distracts his brother Soya and Shiba engages the remaining Tou members. A pine-sorcery barrier separates them, forcing Hakuri to battle Soya alone. Cornered, Hakuri awakens his latent Isou sorcery. Meanwhile, Chihiro encounters Yura, leader of Hishaku, who covets Shinuchi. Maintaining discipline despite provocation, Chihiro shatters the barrier to assist Hakuri before regrouping with Shiba. Hakuri—remembering a woman's suicide tied to the auction—unlocks his hereditary Storehouse control, defeating Soya. Below, Tenri, the youngest Tou, wields an unstable Datenseki weapon but succumbs to its effects. Reunited, the trio finds the Storehouse entrance destroyed. Using his awakened power, Hakuri transports Chihiro inside, where he reclaims Enten by expending Cloud Gouger's residual energy.
5	December 4, 2024	978-4-08-884348-3	November 4, 2025	978-1-9747-5891-3
38. "Race" (競合, Seriai); 39. "Surpass!" (超えろ!!, Koero!!); 40. "The Tip" (一端, Ittan); 41. "Fervent" (熱狂, Nekkyō); 42. "Everything" (全部, Zenbu); 43. "Fulfill" (全う, Mattō); 44. "The Curtain Falls" (閉幕, Heimaku); 45. "What Comes Next" (これからの話く, Korekara no Hanashi); 46. "Unruly Punk" (勝手な野郎, Katte na Yarō)
Within the collapsing Storehouse, Chihiro battles Kyora while freeing imprisoned captives. Mortally wounded, Kyora grasps the Shinuchi in desperation, triggering the Sword Saint's influence that destabilizes both the blade and the auction venue. As the structure crumbles, Hiyuki joins the fight against the possessed Kyora. Chihiro successfully evacuates all prisoners before the Storehouse vanishes. In his dying moments, Kyora acknowledges his past mistreatment of Hakuri. With the Rakuzaichi in ruins and the Shinuchi relinquished, Chihiro's truce with Hiyuki ends. Horrified by the blade's destructive potential, he surrenders it to the Kamunabi while negotiating to retain Enten by joining their ranks. During his tribunal before Kamunabi leadership, Chihiro proposes using Hakuri's Storehouse abilities to reclaim the remaining Enchanted Blades through direct contact with their bearers—currently guarded in fortified Kamunabi strongholds. As deliberations grow heated, news arrives of a Hishaku assault on one fortress. The organization hastily deploys Chihiro and Hakuri to protect Uruha, a sword bearer now under imminent threat.
6	March 4, 2025	978-4-08-884399-5	February 3, 2026	978-1-9747-6287-3
47. "Uruha" (漆羽); 48. "The Kokugoku Steam Squad" (国獄 湯煙スクワッド, Kokugoku Yukemuri Sukuwaddo); 49. "Deadlock" (均衡, Kinkō); 50. "Interception" (迎撃, Geigeki); 51. "Samura" (座村); 52. "Just the Two of Us" (2人きり, Futari-kiri); 53. "Darkness" (暗がり, Kuragari); 54. "Friendship" (友情, Yūjō); 55. "Fight Alongside" (共闘, Kyōtō); 56. "Daybreak" (夜更け, Yofuke)
Chihiro and Hakuri escort Yoji Uruha, bearer of the Kumeyuri blade, aboard a train intercepted at the next station by Hiruhiko of the Hishaku. To protect Uruha, Chihiro engages Hiruhiko and his mercenary sorcerers, their battle spilling into a kabuki theater. After dispatching the reinforcements and severing Hiruhiko's arms, Chihiro earns the wounded youth's reluctant trust, extracting Hishaku intelligence amid the fleeing audience. Meanwhile, Hakuri and Uruha reach Senkutsuji Temple, joining Seiichi Samura—blind master of the Tobimune blade and the Iai White Purity Style. When pine-sorcery-wielding Hishaku forces assault the temple, Samura's retainers, the Masumi ninja trio, mount a desperate defense. Hakuri activates his Storehouse ability to deliver Tobimune to Samura, enabling the swordsman to annihilate the invaders with the blade's unleashed power.
7	May 2, 2025	978-4-08-884413-8	May 5, 2026	978-1-9747-6574-4
57. "Collapse" (崩壊, Hōkai); 58. "Reunion" (再会, Saikai); 59. "Blackout" (暗転, Anten); 60. "Resurrection" (黄泉がえり, Yomigaeri); 61. "Night Battle" (夜戦, Yasen); 62. "Iori" (イヲリ); 63. "Car Chase" (車追跡(カーチェイス), Kā Cheisu); 64. "Become the Samurai" (ビカム侍, Bikamu Samurai); 65. "Imitate" (見真似, Mimane)
While fleeing the collapsing Senkutsuji temple, Samura betrays and kills Uruha with Tobimune. His pact with the Hishaku is revealed: eliminate all sword bearers, deliver their blades, kill the Sword Master, then face the Hishaku in mutual annihilation. At the kabuki theater, Hiruhiko escapes Chihiro, renewing his Kumeyuri contract before Hakuri's sorcery transports Chihiro to Senkutsuji. Samura kills Chihiro and attempts to claim Enten, but Shiba intervenes, saving both. Samura flees, deploying an Owl nationwide to detect enchanted blade usage. Chihiro miraculously revives and rejoins the Masumi, learning of Samura's daughter Iori—her memories of their relation magically erased. The Hishaku plan to use her against Samura. The Masumi relocate Iori from her school to the Kyoto Bloodshed Hotel, where Chihiro trains in Iai White Purity Style against Hishaku swordsman Kuguri. Under the hotel's mystical veil, Chihiro resolves to inform Iori of her father and vows her protection.
8	July 4, 2025	978-4-08-884566-1	August 4, 2026	978-1-9747-1650-0
66. "Truth" (真実, Shinjitsu); 67. "Kyoto Bloodshed Hotel" (ザ殺戮ホテル, Za Satsuriku Hoteru); 68. "Metamorphosis" (変幻, Hengen); 69. "The Guy with the Scar" (傷ノ男, Kizu no Otoko); 70. "Iai White Purity Style" (『居合白禊流』, Iai Byakkei-ryū); 71. "Contest" (勝負, Shōbu); 72. "Future" (未来(さき), Saki); 73. "Daybreak" (黎明, Reimei); 74. "Dawn" (夜明け, Yoake)
As Chihiro explains Iori's past, her memories resurface while the Masumi prepare a new seal. Moving to the rooftop with them, Iori recalls her childhood: after her mother's death, estranged father Samura cared for her until Hishaku leader Yura exposed the truth of the Seitei War—how Japan retaliated against the Datenseki-powered invaders by slaughtering 200,000 with Magatsumi. When public backlash threatened Iori, Samura had the Masumi erase her memories and sent her away. Meanwhile, Chihiro retrieves a seal key from the lobby, confronting Hiruhiko who has killed the staff. Though initially overpowered, Chihiro forces him to the rooftop and lands a hit. Now remembering everything, Iori wishes to see Samura again. As Chihiro draws Enten and Hiruhiko summons Kumeyuri, their clashing energies summon Samura himself.
9	October 3, 2025	978-4-08-884653-8	November 3, 2026	978-1-9747-6845-5
75. "Illusion" (幻想, Gensō); 76. "Banquet" (宴, En); 77. "No Longer Relevant" (蚊帳の外, Kaya no Soto); 78. "Switch" (交代, Kōtai); 79. "Threat!!" (曲者!!, Kusemono!!); 80. "Secret Room" (密室, Misshitsu); 81. "Core" (主力, Shuryoku); 82. "Enten Vs. Tobimune" (淵天VS(バーサス)飛宗, Enten Bāsasu Tobimune); 83. "The Enten" (淵天, Enten); 84. "The Wounded" (傷の者たち, Kizu no Mono-tachi); 85. "Open" (開く, Hiraku)
Upon his arrival, Samura confronts Hiruhiko, who is using the Kumeyuri to wreak havoc. Samura wounds Hiruhiko and reclaims the blade, but the Hishaku member is rescued by Kuguri and Toto before Samura can finish him. Simultaneously, the Hishaku attack the Kamunabi headquarters in Tokyo. As Azami deals with the first intruders, the leader Kudo escorts Hakuri to the Shinuchi to use his Storehouse ability to hide it. Kudo sacrifices himself to save Hakuri from a coordinated sorcery attack, after which Hakuri encounters Uruha, who was revived by Samura's Tobimune to break his eternal contract. In Kyoto, Chihiro and Samura duel. Chihiro tells Samura that he knows the truth about the Seitei War and Kunishige's guilt over the destruction caused by the Shinuchi and the other Enchanted Blades. Chihiro reveals that Kunishige's true purpose in Enten was to destroy the other Enchanted Blades. Defeated by Chihiro's resolve and having seen a vision of Iori's mother, Samura finally heals his eyes, allowing him to see Iori for the first time.
10	January 5, 2026	978-4-08-884740-5	February 2, 2027	978-1-9747-6947-6
86. "Quickening" (胎動, Taidō); 87. "Phantoms" ("亡霊", Bōrei); 88. "The First Step" (皮切り, Kawakiri); 89. "Battle Chaos" (乱戦, Ransen); 90. "Kiri" (斬ちゃん, Kiri-chan); 91. "Natsuki" (奈ツ基); 92. "The Swordsmen" (剣士たち, Kenshi-tachi); 93. "Finishing Touches" (仕上げ, Shiage); 94. "The Second Arrow" (二の矢, Ni no Ya); 95. "Flood" (横溢, Ōitsu)
Using allies on the inside, the Hishaku infiltrate the lower levels of the Kamunabi's Headquarters. Kiri Shirakai, granddaughter of Iai White Purity Style master Itsuo Shirakai, escorts Hakuri to the Shinuchi. Meanwhile, Uruha joins forces with Natsuki Misaka, younger brother of sword master Ibuki Misaka, to confront Yura and Hishaku swordfighter Hokuto. It is revealed that the leader of the Kamunabi, Kasen, conspired with the Hishaku to use the Shinuchi's power to rule the nation, and that Yura has remote access to the Shinuchi's abilities. As Yura overpowers Uruha and Natsuki, Azami confronts him.
11	May 1, 2026	978-4-08-885102-0	—	—
96. "Urgency" (切迫, Seppaku); 97. "Vessel" (受け皿, Ukezara); 98. "Ikuto Hagiwara, Worthless Commander" (無能隊長 萩原幾兎, Munō Taichō Hagiwara Ikuto); 99. ""Strongest"" (″一番強い″, Ichiban Tsuyoi); 100. ""Sword Master"" (″剣聖″, Kensei); 101. "Safe Zone" (安全地帯, Anzen Chitai); 102. "What You Need to See" (視るべきモノ, Mirubeki Mono); 103. "Healing" (再生, Saisei); 104. ""Heroes"" (〝英雄〟, Eiyū); 105. "Transformation" (〝変身〟, Henshin)
Communication to the outside is thwarted due to control over the force field being split between the Kamunabi's vessel and Hishaku member Yukisada. Hakuri, Kiri, and Ikuto Hagiwara are unable to kill Yukisada due to his regenerative abilities. Instead of being killed as a last resort, the Kamunabi's force field vessel is transported to Hakuri's storehouse space. Meanwhile, Yura overpowers Azami and makes his way to the enclosure of Akemura Soga, the Sword Master and wielder of Magatsumi. Surprised that Akemura is still sane and able to rationalize his past actions, Yura proposes joining forces to rule Japan, and is handed Magatsumi by Akemura. When communications are reestablished, Shiba teleports Yura to the streets above Kamunabi HQ, where Chihiro and Seiichi Samura are waiting. As Shiba evacuates nearby civilians, Chihiro and Samura fight Yura. During the duel, Yura tells Chihiro that due to the Enchanted Blades being sealed away, Kunishige is to blame for the chaos gripping Japan. After being gravely wounded by Chihiro, Yura gives total control of his body to Akemura, who fights Chihiro and Samura with the full power of Magatsumi. After temporarily subduing Samura, Akemura confronts Chihiro to talk.
12	September 4, 2026	978-4-08-885177-8	—	—
106. "Karma" (宿縁, Shukuen); 107. "This Moment" (この一瞬, Kono Isshun); 108. "Enten vs. Magatsumi" (淵天VS(バーサス)勾罪, Enten Bāsasu Magatsumi); 109. "Tobimune vs. Magatsumi" (飛宗VS(バーサス)勾罪, Tobimune Bāsasu Magatsumi); 110. "As a Swordsman" (剣士として, Kenshi to Shite); 111. "Apex" (頂, Itadaki); 112. "Future" (未来, Mirai); Bonus Chapter: "Soya Sazanami's Memories, Begone!" (漣宗也の戻らないで記憶, Sazanami Soya no Modoranai de Kioku); 113. "Rock" (石, Ishi)
Akemura reveals himself as Chihiro's maternal uncle and reaffirms his mission to eradicate evil and protect the innocent, using this justification for employing Malediction on Shokoku. Samura arrives and assists Chihiro in the duel against Akemura. Chihiro initially holds his ground but is ultimately gravely wounded by his uncle, and Enten is broken. Akemura then breaks into Kamunabi headquarters to eliminate those who aided in the disappearance of Kunishige and the Enchanted Blades. Samura confronts Akemura, using his Suzaku regenerative ability to counter Malediction, heal Chihiro, and partially restore Enten. As Shiba arrives to extract Chihiro, Samura employs the black flames of Tobimune in a final clash, wounding Akemura but suffering a fatal bisection. Before dying, he tells Akemura that the Seitei War cursed them, and just as Chihiro freed him, Chihiro will do the same for Akemura too. Seiichi Samura then disintegrates, but not before sending Tobimune to Iori. Chihiro and Shiba escape, while Akemura forces Kasen to reorganize the Kamunabi around himself, determined to demonstrate the true power of the Enchanted Blades. In hiding, Chihiro reunites with Iori and the Masumi, receives the broken blade portion of Enten, and returns to his family home to begin reforging it. About twenty years ago, prior to the Seitei War, Togo Shiba of the Sorcery Bureau infiltrates a yakuza meeting and secures a small piece of Datenseki originally taken from Shokoku Island. His partner, Shuji Mashiro, then arrives. Despite orders to deliver the mineral to their superiors, Shiba and a reluctant Mashiro instead bring the Datenseki to Kunishige Rokuhira.

==== Chapters not yet in tankōbon format ====
These chapters have yet to be published in a tankōbon volume.

114. "Kunishige Rokuhira" (六平国重)
115. "Swordsmith" (刀匠, Tōshō)
116. "Princess" (姫, Hime)
117. "The Irishima Talks" (杁島会談, Irishima Kaidan)
118. "The Irishima Talks, Part 2" (杁島会談 弐, Irishima Kaidan Ni)
119. "The Irishima Talks, Part 3" (杁島会談 参, Irishima Kaidan San)
120. "The Irishima Talks, Part 4" (杁島会談 肆, Irishima Kaidan Shi)
121. "The Irishima Talks — END" (杁島会談 終, Irishima Kaidan Shū)
122. "Start" (始動, Shidō)
123. "Chiaki" (千晃)
124. "Powerless" (無力, Muryoku)
125. "Smelting" (製鉄, Seitetsu)
126. "Fire" (火, Hi)
127. "Smelting, Part 2" (製鉄 弐, Seitetsu Ni)
128. "Smelting, Part 3" (製鉄 参, Seitetsu San)
129. "Ironworks" (製鉄 肆, Seitetsu Shi)
130. "I'm Fine!" (大丈夫!, Daijōbu!)
131. "Tipping Point" (転換点, Tenkanten)
132. "Misaka" (巳坂)
133. "Misaka Version II" (巳坂二号, Misaka Ni-gō)
134. "Masters of the Sword" (剣豪, Kengō)
135. "The War Begins" (開戦, Kaisen)
136. "Mikaboshi" (箕加星)
137. "Fork" (分岐, Bunki)
138. "Heavy Charge" (重責, Jūseki)
139. "Battle at Yagira Villa" (柳楽邸決戦, Yagira-tei Kessen)
140. "Battle at Yagira Villa, Part 2" (柳楽邸決戦 弐, Yagira-tei Kessen Ni)
- Bonus chapters:

"Genichi Sojo's Bathhouse Quest" (双城厳一のお風呂探訪♨, Sōjō Gen'ichi no Ofuro Tanbō)
"Genichi Sojo's Bathhouse Quest #2" (双城厳一のお風呂探訪♨ #2, Sōjō Gen'ichi no Ofuro Tanbō Ni)

=== Anime ===
In December 2024, Toyo Keizai Online reported that an anime adaptation would be developed by Cypic, then known as CygamesPictures, through a joint production by CyberAgent and Shochiku. It was later announced in April 2026 to be a television series, and will be directed by Tetsuya Takeuchi, with Keigo Sasaki handling character designs. The series is set to premiere in April 2027. Crunchyroll will stream the series worldwide, except in Japan, mainland China, North Korea, and South Korea. Muse Communication has licensed the series in South and Southeast Asia.

Prior to the television airing, starting in July 2026, the first 20 minutes of the first episode are being screened at various anime events as part of the "world tour" event for the series, including Anime Expo in Los Angeles and Anime NYC in New York, United States; Japan Expo in Paris, France; and AnimagiC in Mannheim, Germany. The tour is set to conclude in Japan in Q2 2027 with a screening of the full first episode.

== Reception ==
=== Popularity ===
Upon release, Kagurabachi surpassed series such as Spy × Family, Dragon Ball Super, and Boruto on Manga Plus's popularity ranking. Its sudden popularity amongst global readers was partially the result of numerous Internet memes, with many ironically considering it to be the inheritor of Weekly Shōnen Jump's "Big Three" (One Piece, Naruto, and Bleach). Its first chapter was the world's most viewed in its first week of publication on Manga Plus, and the series received over 99 million page views on the platform by April 2024.

Kagurabachi ranked seventh on AnimeJapan's "Most Wanted Anime Adaptation" poll in 2024. It ranked 22nd on the 2024 "Book of the Year" list by Da Vinci magazine; it ranked 13th on the 2025 list. It ranked sixth on Takarajimasha's Kono Manga ga Sugoi! list of best manga of 2025 for male readers.

The series has been recommended by manga creators Kōhei Horikoshi and Masashi Kishimoto, and the musician Vaundy.

=== Sales ===
By July 2024, the manga had over 350,000 copies in circulation (including digital copies); over 600,000 copies in circulation by August 2024; over 1 million copies in circulation by October 2024; over 1.3 million copies in circulation by December 2024; and over 2.2 million copies in circulation by May 2025. By October 2025, the manga had sold over 3 million copies. By April 2026, it had over 4 million copies in circulation. By October 2026, it had over 4.5 million copies in circulation.

In North America, the volumes of Kagurabachi were ranked on Circana BookScan's monthly top 20 adult graphic novels list since November 2024. They were also ranked on The New York Times' Graphic Books and Manga bestseller monthly list since December 2024.

In the Billboard Japan Hot Shot Books 2026—which ranks books with the greatest commercial growth and increase in popularity—the volume 10 ranked second.

=== Accolades ===
In 2024, the manga won the 10th Next Manga Award in the print category, and was also nominated for the 70th Shogakukan Manga Award. In 2025, it was nominated for the 49th Kodansha Manga Award in the shōnen category and for the Eisner Awards's Best U.S. Edition of International Material—Asia category. In 2026, the series won the Daruma for Best Action Manga and was nominated in the Daruma for Best Drawing and New Manga categories at the Japan Expo Awards.
