= The Pumpkin Wine =

Japanese media franchise

- Cover of the first manga volume

Theかぼちゃワイン (The Kabocha Wain)
- Genre: Romantic Comedy
- Manga
- Written by: Mitsuru Miura
- Published by: Kodansha
- Magazine: Weekly Shōnen Magazine
- Original run: 1981 – 1984
- Volumes: 18
- Manga

The Kabocha Wine — Sequel
- Written by: Mitsuru Miura
- Published by: Seirindo
- Published: October 15, 2006
- Volumes: 1
- Manga

The Kabocha Wine — Another
- Written by: Mitsuru Miura
- Published by: Akita Shoten
- Magazine: Play Comic
- Original run: June 20, 2007 – 2009
- Volumes: 6
- Anime television series
- Directed by: Kimio Yabuki
- Produced by: Kato Morihiro
- Music by: Osamu Shoji
- Studio: Toei Animation
- Original network: ANN (TV Asahi)
- Original run: July 5, 1982 – August 27, 1984
- Episodes: 95
- Anime film

The Kabocha Wine: Nita no Aijou Monogatari
- Directed by: Kimio Yabuki
- Produced by: Chiaki Imada
- Music by: Osamu Shooji
- Studio: Toei Animation
- Released: July 14, 1984
- Runtime: 24 minutes
- Live-action film

The Kabocha Wine - Another
- Directed by: Hitoshi Ishikawa
- Released: October 26, 2007
- Runtime: 78 minutes

The Pumpkin Wine (Japanese: Theかぼちゃワイン, Hepburn: The Kabocha Wain; lit. 'The Pumpkin Wine') is a Japanese manga series written and illustrated by Mitsuru Miura. It was serialized in Kodansha's Weekly Shōnen Magazine from 1981 to 1984. The Kabocha Wine received the 1983 Kodansha Manga Award for the shōnen category.

The sequel to the manga, The Kabocha Wine — Sequel (The かぼちゃワイン sequel; lit. 'The Pumpkin Wine — Sequel') is a one-shot manga published by Seirindo on October 15, 2006.

The third series of the manga, The Kabocha Wine — Another (The♥かぼちゃワインAnother; lit. 'The Pumpkin Wine — Another') is published by Akita Shoten.

It has been adapted into a 95-episode anime series by Toei Animation.

The sequel to the anime was in the form of an animated movie, called The Kabocha Wine: Nita no Aijou Monogatari (Theかぼちゃワイン ニタの愛情物語, The Pumpkin Wine: Nita's Love Story), which was released on July 14, 1984, by Toei Animation.

On October 26, 2007, wint released a DVD for the live-action movie adaptation of the third manga series, called The Kabocha Wine — Another (The かぼちゃワインAnother; lit. 'The Pumpkin Wine — Another'). Directed by Hitoshi Ishikawa, the movie starred Yoko Kumada.

== Characters ==
Shunsuke Aoba (青葉春助, Aoba Shunsuke) Voiced by: Toshio Furukawa
Shunsuke is the main character of the series, and Natsumi's boyfriend. He is a very short 2nd year middle school student, being only 1.45 m (4 ft 9 in). Generally gruff, proud and stubborn, Shunsuke is nonetheless a good-hearted, strong and brave guy. He is afraid of dogs, loves to eat and does not disdain to fight.
Natsumi Asaoka (朝丘夏美, Asaoka Natsumi) Nickname: L (エル, Eru), as in 'L Size' Voiced by: Keiko Yokozawa
Natsumi is the female protagonist of the series, and Shunsuke's girlfriend. She is taller and bustier than the average Japanese girl, being 1.80 m (5 ft 11 in). She does not mind letting Shunsuke touch her breasts or see her naked. She is very sweet, nice, intelligent, judicious, stubborn, energetic, cheerful and agreeable.
Kotaro Hayakawa (早川小太郎, Hayakawa Kotarou) Voiced by: Kiyonobu Suzuki (Yoku Shioya for episodes 2, 3, and 9)
Kotaro is Shunsuke's classmate. He is usually very shy and timid, and admires Shunsuke for his masculinity and bravery. He wishes to be just like Shunsuke someday, and does whatever he can to impress him. Outside of middle school, his family owns a flower shop.

== Media ==
=== The Kabocha Wine ===
No.	Japanese release date	Japanese ISBN
1	May 15, 1981	4-06-172748-6
2	June 18, 1981	4-06-172753-2
3	September 17, 1981	4-06-172776-1
4	November 18, 1981	4-06-172789-3
5	January 18, 1982	4-06-172805-9
6	March 16, 1982	4-06-172814-8
7	June 16, 1982	4-06-172834-2
8	July 16, 1982	4-06-172846-6
9	October 15, 1982	4-06-172858-X
10	December 15, 1982	4-06-172868-7
11	March 17, 1983	4-06-172879-2
12	May 16, 1983	4-06-172894-6
13	July 15, 1983	4-06-172908-X
14	October 14, 1983	4-06-172924-1
15	January 13, 1984	4-06-172940-3
16	March 15, 1984	4-06-172953-5
17	May 15, 1984	4-06-172967-5
18	September 14, 1984	4-06-172981-0

=== The Kabocha Wine – Sequel ===
No.	Japanese release date	Japanese ISBN
1	October 2006	4-7926-0397-8

==== The Kabocha Wine - Another ====
The third series of the manga is published by Akita Shoten. As of August 2009, Akita Shoten has published six tankōbon of the manga.

No.	Release date	ISBN
1	June 20, 2007	978-4-253-25091-7
2	December 20, 2007	978-4-253-25092-4
3	April 18, 2008	978-4-253-25093-1
4	August 20, 2008	978-4-253-25094-8
5	January 20, 2009	978-4-253-25095-5
6	August 20, 2009	978-4-253-25096-2

=== Anime ===
Cover of The Kabocha Wine 1st DVD Box

Toei Animation broadcast the 95 episodes of The Kabocha Wine on TV Asahi between July 5, 1982, and August 27, 1984. The anime was also broadcast in French by Mangas and TF1. It was also broadcast in Italy on Europa 7 and Italia 7.

The anime uses three pieces of theme music. "L is Lovely" (Lはラブリー, L Wa Raburii) by Kumiko Kaori is the opening theme for the entire series. "The Nature of Aoba Shunsuke" (青葉春介、ザ・根性, Aoba Shunsuke The Konjou) by Toshio Furukawa is the first ending theme, while "Pumpkin Night" (パンプキン・ナイト, Panpukin Naito) by Toshio Furukawa and Keiko Yokozawa is the second ending theme for the anime.

On September 27, 2006, wint released the first DVD box set for The Kabocha Wine. The box set contains the first 48 episodes over 8 DVDs, each with 6 episodes. On November 29, 2006, wint released the second DVD box set for The Kabocha Wine. The second DVD box contains eight DVDs spanning the episodes 49 to 95.

=== Animation CD ===
On March 21, 2007, Columbia Music Entertainment released an animation CD for The Kabocha Wine, called The Kabocha Wine Ongakushu. The songs were sung by Osamu Shouji.
