= Villains Are Destined to Die =

Web novel by Gwon Gyeoeul

- Author: Gwon Gyeoeul
- Country: South Korea
- Language: Korean
- Genre: Isekai; Romance; Thriller
- Publisher: D&C Media (Korean); Yen Press (English)
- Media type: Web novel
- No. of books: 5

Villains Are Destined to Die

악역의 엔딩은 죽음뿐 RR: Agyeogui endingeun jugeumppun MR: Agyŏgŭi endingŭn chugŭmppun
- Author: Gwon Gyeoeul
- Illustrator: SUOL
- Publisher: D&C Media (Korean); Yen Press (English)
- Webtoon service: KakaoPage; Tapas
- Original run: 1 May 2020 – 9 August 2026
- Volumes: 9
- Anime television series

Villains Are Destined to Die (Korean: 악역의 엔딩은 죽음뿐) is a South Korean web novel by Gwon Gyeoeul, later adapted into a manhwa webtoon by SUOL. Both works were licensed by Yen Press and released in English. An anime television series adaptation has been announced.

== Plot ==
While trying to unlock the new ending of the reverse harem mobile game Daughter of the Duke’s Super Love Project through hard mode, university student Siyeon Cha falls asleep and finds herself as the game's villainess Penelope Eckhart. Knowing that her character always dies in Hard Mode, Siyeon tries to beat the game while her adoptive father doesn't acknowledge her often and her other brothers mistreat her.

== Media ==
=== Web novel ===
Written by Gwon Gyeoeul, Villains Are Destined to Die was originally published as a web novel on KakaoPage and Tapas. D&C Books released the web novel in five volumes in September 2020. In 2024, Yen Press licensed the novel in English for their Ize Press imprint, with the first volume released in August 2025.

No.	Original release date	Original ISBN	English release date	English ISBN
1	18 September 2020	979-11-2645-221-7	26 August 2025	979-84-0090-355-7
2	18 September 2020	979-11-2645-222-4	16 December 2025	979-84-0090-358-8
3	18 September 2020	979-11-2645-223-1	12 May 2026	979-84-0090-361-8
4	18 September 2020	979-11-2645-224-8	15 September 2026	979-84-0090-364-9
5	18 September 2020	979-11-2645-225-5	30 March 2027	979-84-0090-368-7

=== Webtoon ===
Illustrated by SUOL, a manhwa webtoon based on the novel was originally published on Tapas before being published as book volumes. In July 2022, Yen Press confirmed that they would license the webtoon in English, as one of the first five releases for their Ize Press imprint. It ended on 9 August 2026.

No.	Original release date	Original ISBN	English release date	English ISBN
1	26 February 2021	979-11-9136-353-1	8 November 2022	979-84-0090-000-6
2	14 May 2021	979-11-9136-377-7	21 February 2023	979-84-0090-002-0
3	5 November 2021	979-11-6777-013-4	23 May 2023	979-84-0090-014-3
4	12 August 2022	979-11-7382-010-6	22 August 2023	979-84-0090-046-4
5	3 December 2022	979-11-6777-053-0	21 November 2023	979-84-0090-053-2
6	28 July 2023	979-11-6777-119-3	20 February 2024	979-84-0090-126-3
7	30 July 2024	979-11-9382-133-6	18 February 2025	979-84-0090-214-7
8	28 April 2025	979-11-7382-007-6	18 November 2025	979-84-0090-418-9
9	29 January 2026	979-11-7382-078-6	18 August 2026	979-84-0090-575-9

=== Anime ===
An anime television series adaptation was announced on 9 August 2026.

== Reception ==
The first manhwa volume was ranked #16 at Circana (formerly NPD) BookScan's 2023 annual top 20 author graphic novels. The manhwa won the 2024 AnimaniA Award for Best Manga International: Shojo/Josei.

=== Critical reception ===
Rebecca Silverman of Anime News Network said that despite the "oversaturated" nature of villainess isekai, the novel's first volume "is worth your time, not because it's Korean rather than Japanese and therefore uses a potentially different set of tropes, but because it does something that precious few of its genre fellows do: it understands how otome games work". However, she considered the idea of a slave being Penelope's preferred love interest "the major fly in the plot ointment", noting that said slave, Eckles, handles it "in line with the sort of facile writing about slavery found in many lower-quality isekai works, which does feel deliberate, because Gwon's writing is otherwise smarter and better than that".

==== Manhwa ====
Silverman praised the manhwa as "well-written, making use of actual game mechanics in ways that benefit the story, and with a heroine whose issues come more from her life experience than her preconceived notions about the game she's living". Noemi10 of Anime UK News gave the first three volumes a 9/10 rating and the fourth and fifth volumes an 8/10 rating; they said that "the story drags you in whether you want it or not, and you cannot put it down until you reach the last page" and also praised the character personalities, but criticized the ending of volume 2 for its lack of engagement and noted a few issues with the English translation in volumes 4 and 5, which they were "not sure if it’s due to the change in translator or how the dialogue was written originally in Korean." Josh Piedra of The Outerhaven praised the story, saying that "I rarely see an isekai where the character manages to get out these days… either that or the series is still ongoing and they haven’t reached that point", but felt that the plot twist of the game glitching from Penelope's off-script behavior "sticks out like a sore thumb and makes me question how something like that is even possible".

Silverman and Noemi10 praised the art of the manhwa, with the former noting that "the art is gorgeous and uses some very nice details, both in the backgrounds and costumes and as visual indicators of Penelope's choices" and the latter saying: "The gothic and fantasy settings, and the use of pastel colours make it almost seem fairy-tale like but with a darker twist. Almost in-between the Disney happy-ending fairy tales and the original Grimm’s stories."

Merlyn De Souza of Screen Rant said that the manhwa "is easily the most popular title in the villainess genre and for good reason", noting that "the series boasts an incredibly compelling plot with stunning art and a titillating enemies-to-lovers romance that constantly keeps readers on the edge of their seats." Silverman called it "one of, if not the, only otome isekai stories I've read that appears to have been written by someone who has played otome games, particularly the mobile versions with their microtransactions". Sarah Jessica Darley noted that the manhwa is an example of how reincarnated villainess manhwa lie on an axis where similar works are "at heart, metafictional experiments in genre" (among other things).
