= Tezuka Award =

Japanese semi-annual manga award

The Tezuka Award (Japanese: 手塚賞, Hepburn: Tezuka Shō) is a semi-annual manga award offered by the Japanese publisher Shueisha since 1971, under the auspices of its Weekly Shonen Jump magazine. It awarded new manga artists in the Story Manga category. Its counterpart award, Akatsuka Award, awards new manga artists in the Comedic Manga category. The award is named after the manga pioneer Osamu Tezuka and is designed to cultivate new artists. The prize for a top Selected Work is two million Japanese yen and for a lesser but still worthy work, a million yen. The award also has third place honorable mentions for contestants deemed worthy, that includes half a million yen. These cash prizes may not be awarded (as is often the case) if the judges decide that none of the candidates are worthy.

== Selection committee ==
=== Committee chair ===
- Osamu Tezuka (1971–1988)
- Fujio Akatsuka (1989–2008). Due to his failing health, this title was merely a formality during the years leading up to his death on August 2, 2008, with his duties handled by Akira Toriyama in his absence.

=== Major committee members ===
These are the most prominent members of the committee only. Other adjudicators are also present in the committee.

Former members

- Akira Toriyama
- Kazuki Takahashi
- Masanori Morita
- Masashi Kishimoto
- Hiroyuki Asada
- Takehiko Inoue

Current members

- Tezuka Productions
- Eiichiro Oda
- Kazue Kato
- Kohei Horikoshi
- Nobuhiro Watsuki
- Gege Akutami

== Recipients ==
No.	Year	Winner	Runner up	Honorable mention
1	1971	No award given	No award given	Scrap, Takashi Iwashige; Shihatsu, Tsuneki Sagara; Frozen Youth, Rikuo Kasa; Easy Rider, Furuya Tsuguharu
2	1971	No award given	Gakisuteyama, Bontarō Takaoka; Holy Things, Hisao Saitō	Girl Who Sings Blues, Takashi Iwashige; Dream Kamen, Shigeru Nakamoto
3	1972	Garagara Umauma, Shigeru Nakamoto	No award given	Kūsō Buraku, Masao Takaoka; Our Sunset, Pochi Nohara; What You Dropped, Tadashi Kaga
4	1972	No award given	Run! Shooting Star, Kazuto Kurosaki	Father's Flag, Akira Mimori; The Circus Guy Fell in Love, Tetsu Kuroba; Sukiyaki, Hiroshi Saitō; Tokio's Time Travel, Toshio Ban; Don't Lose, Kisaburo, Kimio Yanagisawa
5	1973	No award given	Shoot and Stop, Akira Mimori; Night Smothered in Fog, Hiroshi Masumura	My Alps, Yoshihiro Takahashi; Clouds and Tank Soldiers, Pochi Nohara; Can't Become an Angel, Katsumi Sugawara; Dad's Safe Passage, Shizuo Shiga; The Remaining One, Toshio Ban
6	1973	No award given	Inquisition, Seiji Tanaka; Once Upon a Time in Kobikiyama, Pochi Nohara	Ora wa Ametarō, Ikki Matsuda; Kaminarimon Flourishing, Shizuo Shiga; The Last Youth Baseball, Yasuhiro Kunitomo; The Wandering Box Is, Mitsuru Miura
7	1974	Creature City, Daijirō Morohoshi	No award given	Teacher Gami, Toshio Mitani; Wandering Yamanba, Pochi Nohara; Browsing Banned, Saburō Ishikawa; Twin Banzai, Mio Murao
8	1974	No award given	No award given	Strange Picture Diary, Yukio Otsuka; Idiot, Tadashi Fugu; Vagabond, Kazuo Hattori; My First Love, Yasuhiko Hachino
9	1975	Harukanaru Asa, Yukinobu Hoshino	No award given	Hey! Newspaper, Yasuyuki Kunitomo; Yamada-kun's Story, Anmei Yamada; The Great Incident of Mt. Ikazuchi, Toshi Noma; I Won't Go Crazy, Mitsuru Miura
10	1975	No award given	Ancestors From the Future, Toshi Noma	At the End of the Smoking Pitch..., Ippei Minami; Red Umbrella, Yasuki Kitahara; Hang in There, Deserter, Sadamu Aiki
11	1976	No award given	No award given	The Great Duel at the Kanedōkan, Toshi Noma; 23 Years Later, Kōhei Mikuni; Kaguyahime War, Tomō Kimura; Tipser Sense Tarō, Toshio Ban; Standing in the Heavens, Masa Kojima; Mīnya's Wish, Mitsuo Hashimoto; Magic Eye, Masayuki Kawachi; Pit Viper, Shuku Eishō; From the Beast Village, Yoshinori Kobayashi
12	1976	Urashima, Keiichi Koike	Invasion of the Underground People!, Tomō Kimura; The Rebellion of Just Two, Toshi Noma	Smash Ken, Salami Nakayama; The Legend of the One-Eyed Bear, Tarō Kamiyoshi
13	1977	No award given	Midnight Visitor, Kazuo Miyasaki; However, the Sun Is Shining, Toshiki Miyazaki; Afterglow and Marbles, Matsujirō Kawano; Sakakibara-kun Land Mine, Yukio Ōtsuka	Hang in There, Mr. Bear, Hidekazu Tanaka; Kansei Strange Tale, Kunihiko Takayoshi; Mother Earth, Turn Green Again, Buichi Terasawa
14	1977	No award given	No award given	Island Nine, Sadamu Aiki; Useless Courage, Tochi Ueyama; Hiroshi, Shinichirō Mori
15	1978	No award given	Consent, Ministry of Recovering Broken Hearts, Masaki Sanboku; Marathon Hacchan, Takeshi Miya	Satisfaction, Ryō Ōasa; Silent Testimony, Akiko Hashima; Jockey, Shōgo Kurosawa; Contaminated Safe, Umezō Hiramatsu
16	1978	No award given	Oh, Ichirō, Kōji Koseki	Big Surfer, Motoki Monma; The Age of Love, Yōichi Izumi; Insect Clearing, Akira Ishiyama; Legend of Rain, Masaki Sanboku; Wild Mark, Little Takeshi; Melody of the Reincarnated, Isamu Mikuni
17	1979	No award given	Last Waltz, Kazuhisa Hotta	Junichi-kun and OB, Yukio Otsuka; Cedar Pole, Hiroshi Takahashi; Tears, Rokusuke Band of Tears, Katsuyuki Edamatsu; You Smell Like a Punk, Big Brother, Seiichi Ishii; Drifting Legend, Hitoshi Tanimura; Stop Nami-chan, Kabutomushi Tarō; Flying Thunder Map, Ryūji Tsugihara
18	1979	No award given	Space Angel, Tsukasa Hojo	Triple One, Masami Okada; Elegy for a Beloved Dog, Mosaku Annaka; On an Ordinary Morning, Ryōichi Fujiwara; Flowers and Storms Go!, Toshio Nobe
19	1980	No award given	Star, Katsumi Shinbo; Idaten Hawk, Umezō Hiramatsu	Tsubasa, Masakazu Katsura; Rain Car Wash, Chinatsu Tomisawa; Go! Bantman, Keiji Tanaka; Yarō Keeps Smiling!!, Tatsuto Uchida
20	1980	No award given	Poker Under Arms, Hirohiko Araki	Youth 120%, Mitsuo Suzuki; Dosukoi Tank, Uryū Minō; Maria, Isao Enomoto; Fighting Spirit, Keiji Tanaka; Cosmo Frontier, Eita Kuri
21	1981	No award given	Run Away to the Lucky Route, Shūhō Itahashi and Argonauts; Devil's Temptation and Targeted Idol, Shinji Watanabe; Shot!, Tetsuya Tanawatari; Tenkōsei wa Hensōsei!?, Masakazu Katsura	Battlenoid, Eita Kuri; Toast with Queen Mary..., Yukihiko Nozuki (writer) and Ryō Watanabe (illustrator)
22	1981	Last Spurt, Shigehiro Nomura	Samson, Masatoshi Usune	Guidepost to the Blue Sky, Iroen Pitsu; My Landing, Akio Adachi; Woman in the Bijin-ga, Tarō Sumitomo; Panicked Time Travel, Yoshihiro Takaiwa
23	1982	No award given	Spacetime Scoundrel, Imuro Yumura; Bd to, Takedaken	Outsider No. 1, Masaru Tanahashi; Space Treasure Island, Eita Kuri; Silver Queen, Hiroko Suzuki; Dear Tomica, Shishin Ōnishi; Charge! One Soldier, Makoto Tamura; Natural Disaster Next Door, Yūji Shinnyū; Hundred Eyes Banquet, Shingo Hirasawa; Break a Rodo, Iku Sakaguchi
24	1982	No award given	Shadow of a Distant Day, Ryūsei Doi; Program, Hisataka Miyoshi	Kohaku Biyori, Toshimitsu Tamada; Burning Purity, Shōichi Yagihashi
25	1983	No award given	No award given	Psychic Sayo, Tadashi Satō; Space-Time Police-2009, Hiroko Suzuki; On the Stage of Men and Women..., Shūichi Takano; Moonlight Stone, Seiju Natsuyama; Battle of V, Shōichi Yagihashi
26	1983	No award given	21st Century Shooting Star, Daimurō Kishi; Heian Yin-Yang Emaki, Hiroshi Suzuki	Maji?, Takehiko Yamada; Beauty Beast, Yoshihiro Kuroiwa
27	1984	No award given	Octopus Teacher, Naoko Sekine; Gallery Key, Yoshiharu Ikeda	S.O. Love Boiling!, Naohiro Nakatani; Can Still Run, Takehiko Yamada; It's Late!, Masanori Morita; School Trouble!!, Hiroyuki Kawashima
28	1984	No award given	Devil's Sword, Shōichi Yagihashi; Biography of Dr. Momohiko Sakurada, Jirō Uda	Teku no Rojii, Takahashi Kurisu; Hirosi..., Ryūsei Doi; Torio, Ryōji Satō
29	1985	Until I Reach the Horizon, Daimurō Kishi	Little Shooter, Kaoru Satō	Tōshō Private High School Soccer Club, Yūichi Oshiyama; Hōjo, Yū Tomizawa; As Long as There Is Spirit, Watabōshi; Mysterious Kid, Shinpō Morita
30	1985	No award given	The Myth of 500 Light Years, Takeshi Obata; Equation of Extinction, Takashi Kurisu	Win! Don Quixote, Junji Mizuno; Coral Flowing..., Tsukko; Star Thief, Kōichi Kagiya; Iron Ingot and Music, Tadamichi Kawamura; Enormous Boy, Makuru Nitaku
31	1986	No award given	Weekend Adventure, Noriko Ishihara; 900 Years Great Battle, Hiromitsu Itō	Goki Gaburi, Ryōji Satō; Boy's Universe From "Star Person", Takumi Shimoura; Spirit, Kazuto Raō; Hurricane General, Hideo Hiroi; Faraway Runaway, Kōji Ōki
32	1986	No award given	To the North: Your Case, Kei Honjō; Private Lesson Is 1:00 AM, Haruki Matsunaga; Marionette of Time, Shū Hoshikawa	Fly of Shō, Harumi Matsuzaki; Mai Never Give Up, Ami Kyōmoto; Chance, Shin Itō
33	1987	No award given	Anrou Ryusei "Legend of the Wild Eagle"; Kenbu & Shimakko "Tornado Legend"	Yasuo Kojima "To the Depths of Consciousness"; Nobuhiro Watsuki "Teacher Pon"; Yukinori Kitajima "Everyone's WINNER!!"; Kanemon Chikugoya "I Watch Clouds and Such"
34	1987	No award given	Yuko Asami "Journey into the Dream of 2001"; Toshiaki Shiro "Night View"; Yoshihiro Togashi "Straight Shoot"	Masakazu Higuchi & Teruo Utsuki "Message from Ancient Times"; Kosuke Takano "BELIEVE IN LOVE"; Noriko Ishihara "I Want to Go to Africa!"
35	1988	Takehiko Inoue "Maple Purple"; Yuko Asami "Jump Run"	Toshifumi Akayama "G (General Exceed) X"	Anrou Ryusei "Sword of Exorcism"; Iwamaro "Country Side – An Incident in the Countryside"; Masakazu Ishida "CHANGE OF THE TIMES"; Katsuo Ouchi "Mountain Hut"
36	1988	No award given	No award given	Shiranuki Nakazora "Gongoro Fox"; Katsuhiko Konno "White Gift – WHITE PRESENT -"; Yoshimi Nakamura "CANNONS!"; Homare Koriyama "J Fighter Yoni"; Kaoru Ichijo "HERO!?"
37	1989	No award given	Katsuhiko Konno "Okaben"; Koji Hayato "YAKSA -Yasha-"; Mitsuhiro Hataoka "Carroty Heart! ―CARROTY HEART!"	Toshimasa Okawara "Lonely Army"; Yoshihiro Yanagawa "Zigzag Syncopation"; Masakatsu Suzuki "Beware the Grinning Face"
38	1989	John M. Rikaku "RUSH BALL・REMIX"	Ken Yuasa "Demon Messenger"	Iwamaro "Witch Town"; Susumu Higa "Class"; Senko Hoshi "DIVENATOR"; Ryoko Kitahara "Mark of Judas"
39	1990	No award given	Hidetomo Sugine "Light of Arshane"; Pao Makino "Day the Bomb Fell"	Yasutomo Iwata "To the Sunny Place – NO TIME TO CRY"; Nobuyuki Sakaki "Two Shon"; Ryu Fujisaki "Pied Piper of Hamelin"; Tom Zack "Man from Fort Worth"
40	1990	No award given	Ryu Fujisaki "WORLDS"; Tenya Yabuno "Clipper of Passion"	Yoichi Inagaki "NON-STOPPER"; Kei Sanbe "Bird's Perspective"
41	1991	No award given	Kunikazu Toda "ROUND"; Kyoichi Takahashi "BELIEVE"; Takashi Sanbe "Memory of the Shore"	Sato "Moon Viewing"; Masaki Kasu "DINO SAUR"; Noriyuki Saito "Busybody Swordsman"
42	1991	No award given	Tatsuya Kaneda "Monologue of a Heartbroken Man"; Shinobu Kaitani "Another Me"; Oda Hagane "GARR!!"	Kaoru Yamaguchi "Evolution Theory of a Superstar"
43	1992	Mandala "On the Day I Was Born"	Ryota Furusawa "Justice Strikes"; Koichiro Matsuda "Gangster Oni Tile Business"	Kazumitsu Banju "YOSHIO-15 GROWING UP"; Muneki Dogen "Zombie Man"; Daisuke Higuchi "Singing Flame"; Koji Kimura "Hot-blooded Flying Romance Fly! Tobimaru"
44	1992	No award given	Hiroyuki Hirose "Ashura"; Seiichi Sakamoto "Tenshin Again"; Eiichiro Oda "WANTED!"	Masaaki Kurihara "Stranger"; Yoshiaki Hyogo "RUNNER"; Koji Kondo "Hurry UP!!"; Mamugar "PRIVATE EYE"
45	1993	No award given	Naohide Toda "Hunter of Immortality"; Yasuyuki Shishima "Position One"	Eita Kagoshima "LOST PARADISE"; Masaaki Kurihara "Map World"; Akiko Takahashi "Blade"
46	1993	No award given	CRM "Falcon"; Kazutoshi Sakuramori "Info The Blue"	Naoki Ito "ARTIST"; Koji Yamagami "Alias Lloyd"; Kayoko Matsuzaki "Parrot Message"; Hori Hidehito "Tsukada Man"
47	1994	No award given	Senko Hoshi "Dark Holy Mother – Dark Maria -"; Takashi Sato "TROUBLE GAME"	Hiroyuki Sakurazawa "FLYING DICE"; Yoichi Suzuki "RUMBLE"; Shin Aso "Ikari Ebito"; Ao Kuuga "Be'Blank"; Yuki Kawashima "D'RIDERS"
48	1994	No award given	Kuroko Yabuguchi "NO BRAKE"; Rikisaku "Backstreet Romance"	Hiroyuki Takei "ITAKO's ANNA"; Hiroyuki Sakurazawa "ODD EYED"; Tatsuya Ando "VETETABLE BOXER MAN"; Jinsei Kataoka "MONSTER?"
49	1995	No award given	Fukagawa Takeda "Song of Love"; Yuki Kawashima "Hastur!"	Pearl Riser Taji "- Koren -"; Hiroyuki Oshima "CHICKEN"; Kenji Masatomi "Pinocchio's Nose"
50	1995	Kaori Yamakawa "Maple House no Watashitachi"	Kisara Shunka "Limit – Limit"; Akio Jōzaki "Tomii's Heart"	Naoto Miyoshi "RUNE・QUEST"; Eita Kagoshima "TAKUYA2 – Takuya no Jijō"; Akitsugu Mizumoto "KIDS"
51	1996	Kanako Tanaka "Ryūsu Tiger Painting"	Kenyū So "Fukutei Senmannen"	Yūki Uno "Guzenya"
52	1996	No award given	Takurō Kajikawa "Bear and Wings"; Makoto Nakatsuka "Zekkei Ichidai Otoko"	Kanata Miyase "Sakushiro Monogatari"; Yukie Kase "Stand Days"
53	1997	No award given	No award given	Masahiko Kaneku "PIANMAN"; Satoshi Yamaura "Yū THE FASTEST FLYER'S LEGEND STORY"; Eiichi Sakawa Hide Take Takahashi "The Super Catharsis"; Kikka Kaburagi "Tora-san"; Toshiyuki Yamada "Let's Go See the Sea"
54	1997	No award given	Daisuke Satō "25M"	Shūhei Miwa "Avenging"; Kyōto Niwa Hibiki Koyama "Passing Syndrome"; Hidenori Oda "Ninja Kurohane-maru"; Takuji Onishiba "Call of Cthulhu '97"
55	1998	No award given	Hirotaka Naitō "Run"; Masahiko Kaneku "6×1"; Yoichirō Tanabe "Kabukichi and My Summer Vacation"	Kengo Kuraudo "SCRAP HEART"; Naoki Higashi Naoki Higashi "CHILDRAGON"; Mayu Ōno "Falling Horse King"
56	1998	No award given	Masaki Koike "BEAT"	Riku Yamada "Sacrificial Princess"; Takeo Maiko Takeo Horibe "God's Errand"; Tokizō Ishii "Shamenju"; Yasue Kondō "Walk Through the Wind"
57	1999	No award given	Tamaya Yaku "The Great Desert Whale"	Osamu Kajisa "Imaizumi Bedding Store"; Makoto Iwasaki "Soldier A"; Kaname Sato "Organ Dissector"; Yoshihiro Ichihara "Medical"; Reiko Itō "At the End of the Cloud Road..."
58	1999	No award given	Makoto Yoshida "Kindergarten"; Tokuji Nonaka "Teru"	Sora Katō "Sengoku Fox Tale"; Sōji Harada "DANGER ZONE!!"; Yumiko Miyagawa "ANGRY MAN"; Yoshitaka Takada / Ryō Tasaka "TRYAD"
59	2000	No award given	Kazue Kato "Me and the Rabbit"	Yōsei Katsuki "Self Control"; Yuki Kobayashi "Plate Disturber"; Yōko Sasaki Minoru Sasaki "Ieon-Secret"; Kōrō Iwamoto "COLORFUL DROPS"
60	2000	No award given	Manabu Fuzuki "Boy"; Masahito Takeo "30 Trillion Yen Crossword"; Ai Ukita "FLYING BUNNY"	Yasue Kondō "Our Own Game"; Kaori Shimada "Lightly My Own Way"; Ryōsuke Takeuchi "47th dreaming"
61	2001	No award given	Pū Manami "Lingering Resonance"; Atsushi Ōba Atsushi Ōba "STARTING POINT"; Ryō Yoshizu "○×"	Satoshi Shingu "DOG GAME"; Nikke "Dragon Killer"; Teruaki Mizuno "E.M friend!"
62	2001	No award given	Hironobu Iwata "AX Battle Axe Legend"; Yukito "MONONOFU"	Oguri Oguri "Zeami"; Yūki Yūki "Lie"; Kazuhiro Moriya "JET SMASH"
63	2002	No award given	Yōichi Amano "CROSS BEAT"; Kōji Tsujii "Thunder Jet"	Ei Andō "Bullet Biscuit"; Tetsuya Tsutsui "Weakest Gunfighter Rubik"
64	2002	No award given	Masashi Satō "Hikihō Daichi"; Ichirō Takahashi "Dormier – Episode I -"	Mitsuka Umeo "Crustacean Kid"; Junichi Satō "Nagasaki!!"; Sayori Ochiai "Nichirin Samurai"
65	2003	No award given	Yūjirō Sakamoto "KING OR CURSE"	Masatsugu Takashima "Mirage Lily"; Takehiro Nikaidō "Savanna"; Toshiaki Ōtake Toshiyuki Ōtake "Smashing Shōnen"; Bibiko Kuronwa "Kōen Oni Midori"; Akira Ihara "I LIKE SOCCER VERY MUCH!!"
66	2003	No award given	Shinya Yoshida "DA!!! – Break the Toilet Wall -"	Izumi Takizawa "Brave Heart"; Keitarō Chisaka "Weird"; Ryō Kuroki "IDea"; Machiko Nakanishi "Mosquito Panic!"
67	2004	No award given	Yūsuke Takahara "Hanabirin Rin"; Shōdai Hattori "The Future is in Our Hands – J.P. STYLE GRAFFITI -"	Daiki Yamada "Matago"; Yūki Tabata "XXX WITH NO NAME"
68	2004	No award given	Toshimasa Kume "REVOLUTION"; Kazuya Miyamoto "Skirt Wars"	Naoki Higashimoto "Savings Machine"; Mayu Satō "White Cat Tofu Sword"
69	2005	Takeshi Kuriyama "Immature Immortal – Mijukusen -"	Kenshirō Nakano "-meteoric- Meteor Uni"	Akio Kawada "Bandits Return"; Mamiko Kinoshita "RODEO"
70	2005	No award given	Ichinose Kouta "Titan's Voice"	Hamada Satoshi "Suicide Trial"; Tanahashi Masatomo "JUICE!!"; Takayama Kenju "Gambledot"
71	2006	Sukeno Yoshiaki "Please Go Home."	No award given	Sasaki Shota "LITTLE ARMAGEDDON"; Nakamura Go "Katsuto"
72	2006	No award given	Yakou Shotaro "Planet"; Watanabe Ippei "TFS ~Track&Field&Soul~"	Kinoshita Satoshi "Tora and Uta Karuta"; Teruda Ei "TOP EDGE"; Kawai Juuzou "Punch Drunk Monk"; Horikoshi Kouhei "Nukegara"
73	2007	Saito Naotake "Hammerhead"	Oikawa Daisuke "DEVIL MAGIC!"; Maeda Hajime "Honoka"; Kimura Satoshi "Kibou no Yaiba"	Ikeda Misako "(Temporary) Guardian Spirit"; Higashikawa Yoshiki "GUREN"; Kikuta Takumi "Forgotten Things"
74	2007	No award given	Takemura Youhei "Meg Ryan's You"	Uchino Masayuki "CRYING"; Shiga Haku "Big Couple"; Fukuda Eiji "KAT"
75	2008	No award given	Ashihara Daisuke "ROOM303"	Sha Toichi "Senkorauta"; Miyatake Yusuke "Nightmare Hero"; White R "Disappointment and Nothing"
76	2008	No award given	Naeshio Haruto "Baribari Delivery"; Yagi Shinya "Don't Forget Tea Time"	Higashi Uo Taro "Manual Life"
77	2009	No award given	Haneda Toyotaka "Ai NO Muchi"	Sumiyoshi Ryo "PEACE"; Kawada "Love and Justice"; Hamakouta "My Rival is My Mom"; Miwa Yoshiyuki "-Awatenbou no-"
78	2009	No award given	No award given	Ueno Shogo "Hore Hore Hollow"; Fuji Niji Yamato "Moon Ladder"; Matsukawa Taro "ANSWER"
79	2010	No award given	Yamada Kintetsu "Tetsuwan Wabisuke"	Ota Ryo "Last 12 Hours"; Mikoshi "Biri tto!"; Funatsu Shinpei "Death is Love"
80	2010	No award given	No award given	Maa Bo (original) & Jouzan Yuui (manga) "Flagman!"; Yamagishi Kai "Angel from Heaven"; Ikezawa Haruto "0.99 -Double Nine-"; Nifutani Yuu "The Masked Heart"; Washimi Taro "Namari and Lantern"
81	2011	No award given	Fujii Hirotaka "CRY"; Yagi Tomohiro "IRON CURTAIN"	Nishino Kento "WILL ~To You~"
82	2011	No award given	Nuda "Tinplate Gera"	Tsukiyama Kenji "NINJA-NOW"; Inai Ryo "Master of My Lamp"; Okuno Yuya "Zombie Gardening"
83	2012	No award given	Irizawa Tomoya "Rain then Clear View"; Kubo Takuya "Bell Ringer's Bread"; Ochiai Koki "Re-Play ~once again~"	Ando Ushio "Heartful Villains"; Nagashii Kohei "Love Test"
84	2012	No award given	No award given	Kobayashi Eiken "KEI×DORO"; Kumagai Shinji "Unchangeable Facts"; Tatsumi Kohei "BROTHER SOLE"; Sukegawa Yuji "Hello, I'm Inukai Dai."
85	2013	No award given	Minagawa Mikuni "No Woman, No Cry."	Furuse Kei "Ghoul's Home"; Ore Masayomi (original) & Uo (manga) "Babel"; Mizuno Takumi "Gatekeeper"; Ogihara Rie "Machine Destroyer"; Ogura Takatoshi "Come Up Smiling!"
86	2013	No award given	Omori Kanata "Bomb Girl"; Aoki Yo "Majimen"	Tamayama Yudai "STAND UP!"; Tsuji Yuuichiro "Gorimacho Heart"
87	2014	No award given	Nakano Shinobu "Kore Ya Kono"; Sakai Atsuro "The Wall Named UNO"; Hamaoka Kouma "Superhuman Baba Baba-ko Legend"	Satomi Shinichi "Hell is Nice."
88	2014	No award given	Harumiya Yosuke "PACK"; Omatsutei Yu "Nanase Island ~ Hiroki's Everyday ~"	Arima Jiro "HIT ME!"; Ueda Taro "Be My Voice."
89	2015	No award given	No award given	Izumi Takuya "Natsume's Leaf"; Tanimoto Tatsuya "Rebel Shogi"; Ken Sogen "Look At Me"
90	2015	No award given	Hishikawa Souta "CROQUIS"	Fujiyama Yu "I'M ALIVE"; Sato Takaki "Soul: Soul"; Obata Ryosuke "Darekashi"; Matsumi Ryohei "Yozuregari"
91	2016	Bando Nao "Real Haunted HOUSE"	No award given	Takezo Ryo "KIKIKI!!"; Fukino Sakae "Demon King Power Generation Gardea"; Yanagie Rika "People Keep Circles in Their Hearts"; Tsujimoto Taku "First Step!"
92	2016	No award given	Kuroki Wataru "Whim"	Ozaki En "Kotowari Hazure"; Shimizu Keigo "LOLLIPOP DESPERADO"; Takayama Hitoshi "Replica"; Tsuzuki Takuya "Legendary Part-timer Kamiyama Shintaro"
93	2017	No award given	Fujimura Dora "Reincarnation -HAKUSAI-"; Minya Hiraga "In the Changing Times"	Masato Shimamura "M"; Yoshihiro Iwakura "No Face -Miyamoto-kun-"; Ukie Ueki "Tai An Youkou"
94	2017	No award given	Kawasaki "Exceptional Rent"; Shiori Ogawa "The Deformed Boy"	Hikaru Mizuno "Kiyokiyoshi-kun and Toilet Seat Girl"; Kohei Nishimoto "Enma's Holiday"; Maki Inmaki "99-tsukumo-"; Yukiki Nishimura "Sakura Samurai"
95	2018	No award given	Chichcheese "DANNY's RADIO"; KYOSKE "BE MADE"; Masashi Hashimoto "TRANS"; Shingo Kimura "Kui Modoshi"; Yuki Yoshida "My Friend Is!"	Takeyoshi Kawashima (Story) & Zenichi Abe (Art) "Ichi to Sen"
96	2018	No award given	No award given	Shizuka Misaki "unbloom"; Naoru Michihiro "Backlight Vanguard"; Anna Yamada "KITSUNE"; Keishi Aida "Jimigojo VS Medusa"; Akihide Nishino "Fallen Hero"; OUGA "I Want to Date You."
97	2019	No award given	Nao Momose "Goodbye Foolish Kidnapper"; Daiga Jeong "Karakuri Kara"; Hands2 "21g"	Itsuki Jito "Torekushidoru Senka"; Ryota Ono (Story) & Shotaro Ono (Art) "-KABUKI-"; Kanami Kimura "Lights Out Time"; Katsuyoshi Wako "Snowflake"; Itsuki Sakurai "Cockroach Man"
98	2019	No award given	Chiki Chigi "Shogi Journey: Hiza Kurige"	Ryota Takano "Modified Phantom Thief Kaizo"; Iou Tokukai "NEGAIGOTO"; Taishin Uemura "Ultimate Monk"; Teito Yuzuriha "Ash Road"; Ryushi Kunimoto "From Coward To You"
99	2020	No award given	Akihoshi Maruyama "Unko Man"; Dai Noda "Mount Runes"	Hiroki Adachi "Wolf of Smoke Escape"; John Don "Assassin Teacher Kahlua"; Yomuto "Daydream"; Taro Kaneko "CHERRY&HELL"; Jun Sugimoto "Kokuya's Judo"
100	2020	No award given	Takeru Hokazono "Enten"; Jin'yu Asakura "Poetry Springtime"	
101	2021	No award given	Kinriku (Story) & Date (Art) "Vegetable Clay!"; Takao Nishimura "ROBOT RONDO"; Youki Sato "AMANE"	Hinako Yano "OLD FASHIONED"; Yoshihiko Hayashi "Octokill"
102	2021	No award given	Omusuke Kobayashi "Everyday Yamabiko"; Seisei Akeari "Concrete and Flowers"; Suichi Chika "A Wish to the Grim Reaper"; Haru Hoshide "NOA Unit 9"; Natsuki Kozonoe "The Desirous High Priest"; Moyuku Midorige "Thunder Boy"	Ken Mamoru "Long Time No See"
103	2022	No award given	Kazuta Mitsumoto "Space Police Soramame"; Kino Oniki "Reverse Syndrome"; Ginji Gan "Being Targeted by Karasuma!"	Naoya Mudou "Bluer than Sorrow"; Mochizuki "Magic Tale"; Ritsujirou Oni "Weird Dream"
104	2022	No award given	Shiro "Ember"; Pehe Amano (Story) & Hachibee (Art) "Garea Knight"	Enishi "Welcome to Normal"; Yu Katayama "Othello"; Matsuhi Hatsuhina "Senpai's Story"
105	2023	No award given	Hiruka Haruno "Genius Brother, Mediocre Me"; Keisuke Ishigami "Creature of the Abyss"	Kota Kanetake "Puppet Show"; Yuduki Nun. ""Thick Black" Love. 96. Intentional, Hardship"; Kazue Senba "Wonderful World"
106	2023	No award given	Kakaku Yoshida "Himeno's Shadow"; Norimi Iwai "HEART SHAKE!"	Chita Goto "Tokai Investigation"; Kotaro Yoshida "Stick Samurai"; Nene Hamano "Hakutanogou"
107	2024	No award given	Tsumiki "Perfect Marriage"; Yubinokosuke Tojo "Zombivision"	Genda Tabei "Child of the Lion"; Dan Misaki "Calliope's Monster"

== Notable recipients ==
- Yoshihiro Takahashi (1973, for My Alps )
- Buichi Terasawa (1977, for Daichi yo Aoku Nare)
- Tsukasa Hojo (1979, for Space Angel,)
- Masakazu Katsura (1980, for Tsubasa and 1981, for Tenkousei wa Hensousei!?)
- Hirohiko Araki (1980, for Poker Under Arms)
- Masanori Morita (1984, for It's Late! )
- Takeshi Obata (1985, for 500 Kōnen no Shinwa)
- Yoshihiro Togashi (1986, for Buttobi Straight)
- Nobuhiro Watsuki (1987, for Teacher Pon)
- Takehiko Inoue (1988, for Kaede Purple)
- Ryu Fujisaki (1990, for WORLDS)
- Kei Sanbe (1990, for Bird's Perspective)
- Shinobu Kaitani (1991, for Another Me)
- Eiichiro Oda (1992, for WANTED!)
- Hiroyuki Takei (1994, for ITAKO's ANNA)
- Yūki Tabata (2004, for XXX WITH NO NAME)
- Kōhei Horikoshi (2006, for Nukegara)
- Takeru Hokazono (2020, for Enten)

== See also ==
- List of manga awards
- List of comics awards
- Tezuka Osamu Cultural Prize
- Akatsuka Award
- List of awards named after people
