= Mitsuru Miura =

Japanese manga artist (born 1954)

- 三浦みつる
- Born: November 25, 1954 (age 71); Yokohama City, Kanagawa Prefecture, Japan
- Occupation: Manga artist
- Years active: 1971–2017
- Notable work: The Kabocha Wine
- Awards: Kodansha Manga Award (1983) 9th Tezuka Award [Honorable Mention] (1975) 6th Tezuka Award [Honorable Mention] (1973)

Mitsuru Miura (三浦 みつる, Miura Mitsuru; born 25 November 1954) is a Japanese manga artist from Yokohama. He is best known for the series The Kabocha Wine, which was adapted as an anime television series, and for which he received the 1983 Kodansha Manga Award for shōnen.

== Career ==
Miura's career took off in 1971, while he was attending Isogo Technical High School. In that year, he won Weekly Shōnen Jump's Young Jump Award for The Story of an Unlucky Man (世にも不幸な男の話, Yonimo fukōna otoko no hanashi). After graduating high school, he went on to be an assistant at Tezuka Productions. Soon after in 1973, he won an Honorable Mention in the 6th Tezuka Award for his series The Wandering Box (さまよう箱は, Samayō hako wa), and another Honorable Mention in 9th Tezuka Award in 1975 for his series I Won't Go Crazy (僕は狂わない, Boku wa kuruwanai).

In 1980, Miura wrote a one-off manga called Musashi and L (武蔵とエル, Musashi to Eru) that released in Weekly Shōnen Magazine. This short story soon evolved into his most popular manga series, The Kabocha Wine, running from 1981 to 1984, containing 18 volumes, and a 95-episode anime series released by Toei Animation, airing from July 5th, 1982 until August 25th, 1984. He credits the inspiration for the series' title from a commercial he once saw, saying "Kabocha is good for you!" (かぼちゃはいいよ！, Kabocha wa ii yo!), which then turned into "The Kabocha Wine", saying that the title had nothing to do with the series' overall premise. His main inspiration for the series was his own childhood, saying that he was usually shorter than most kids in his class, and finding himself attracted to the taller girls at school. To add, the main character, Shunsuke Aoba, is inspired by Miura himself. The female lead, Natsumi Asaoka (known as "L"), is cited to be partially inspired by Yoshiko Miyazaki, a Japanese swimsuit model and actress.

Miura returned to The Kabocha Wine in 2006 with The Kabocha Wine – Sequel and The Kabocha Wine – Another, with the latter being turned into a live-action movie in 2007, which received mixed reviews. In 2017, he returned to the series for the last time with the title "Back To The Kabocha Wine" (バック・トゥー・The♡かぼちゃワイン, Bakku Tu Za Kabocha Wain). After a successful crowdfunding event, he officially retired from manga after a 45-year-long career.

In partnership with 7-Eleven and Lawson, a re-release of the manga for The Kabocha Wine began in 2021, releasing books all over Japanese convenience stores.

== Manga ==
Name	Year	Notes	Ref.
Omoshiro Club (おもしろ倶楽部)	1978–1979	2 volumes	
The Kabocha Wine (Theかぼちゃワイン)	1981–1984	18 volumes	
Coconut AVE. (ココナッツAVE.)	1985–1986	6 volumes	
Pink Spot (ピンクスパット)	1990	2 volumes	
Conbini Maria (コンビにまりあ)	1998–1999	4 volumes	
The Kabocha Wine – Sequel	2006–2009	1 volume	
The Kabocha Wine – Another	2007–2009	6 volumes	
Wonderful	2007	1 volume	
