= Takeru Hokazono =

Japanese manga artist (born 2000)

- 外薗健
- Born: September 6, 2000 (age 26); Osaka Prefecture, Japan
- Occupation: Manga artist
- Years active: 2020–present
- Known for: Kagurabachi

Takeru Hokazono (Japanese: 外薗健, Hepburn: Hokazono Takeru; born September 6, 2000) is a Japanese manga artist. He is best known for Kagurabachi, which is serialized in Shueisha's Weekly Shōnen Jump magazine since September 2023, and licensed by Viz Media in North America.

== Biography ==
Takeru Hokazono was born in the Osaka Prefecture, Japan on September 6, 2000. He grew up reading Weekly Shōnen Jump and had a desire to have a work serialized in the magazine. The author is a fan of Naruto, and the series inspired him to become a manga artist. Hokazono started making manga during the COVID-19 pandemic while he was in college. His first manga was the one-shot Enten published in Jump Giga Spring 2021 issue and won the 100th Tezuka Award. His other one-shot Farewell! Cherry Boy! was also published in the same issue.

== Career ==
In September 2023, the serialized version of Kagurabachi launched in Weekly Shōnen Jump. Hokazono created Kagurabachi because he wanted to write a revenge story. He had already tackled the theme in his one-shots, which led his editor to take on the challenge of serializing Kagurabachi.

Hokazono's Kagurabachi was the highest-voted work in the Manga Plus AX poll, beating out Sakamoto Days, RuriDragon, and Blue Box. The manga won the 10th Next Manga Award in the print category, and was nominated for the 70th Shogakukan Manga Award and the 49th Kodansha Manga Award in the shōnen category. In 2026 he is included on the Forbes Japan 30 Under 30 list (alongside figures like LE SSERAFIM's Sakura).

== Style and influences ==
He is a fan of western films, especially Quentin Tarantino and John Wick films. This prompted the author to go for a revenge-themed story in Kagurabachi. Along with Tarantino, the author is also a fan of directors Christopher Nolan and David Fincher.

Hokazono's story elements in Kagurabachi were also inspired by Naruto, Chainsaw Man, Ajin: Demi-Human, Attack on Titan, and My Hero Academia. His earlier one-shots, especially Enten, were influenced more by Naruto.

== Works ==
Serializations

- Kagurabachi (カグラバチ) (September 2023 – present; serialized in Weekly Shōnen Jump)

One-shots

- Enten (炎天) (April 2021; published in Jump Giga)
- Farewell! Cherry Boy! (さらば！チェリーボーイ！) (April 2021; published in Jump Giga)
- Chain (チエイン) (July 2021; published in Jump Giga)
- Madogiwa de Amu (まどぎわで編む; Knitting by the Window) (April 2022; published in Weekly Shōnen Jump)
- Roku no Meiyaku (ロクの冥約) (August 2022; published in Weekly Shōnen Jump)
