= AnimagiC =

Annual anime convention in Germany

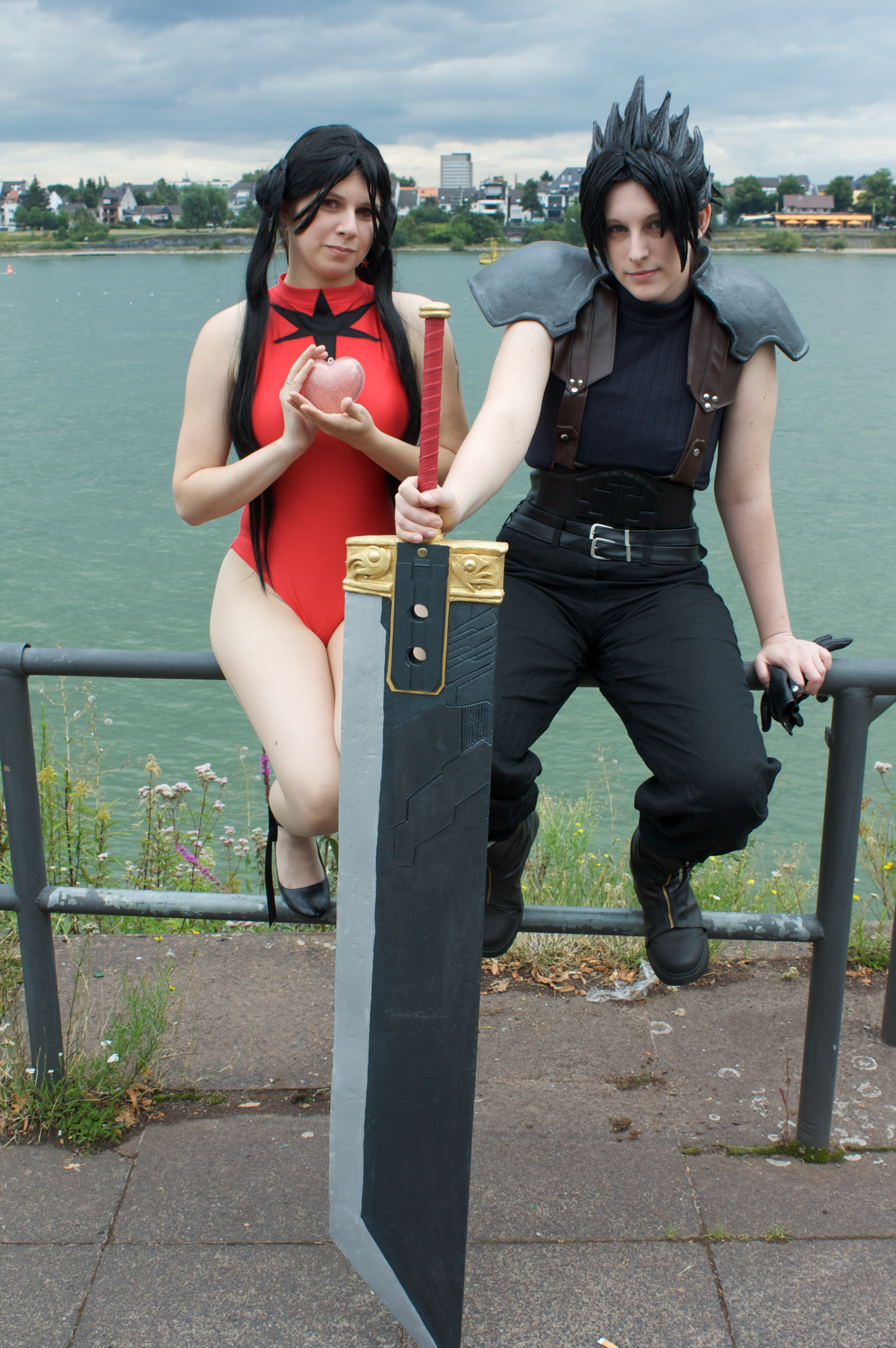
Taken on August 2, 2009, in Bonn, North Rhine-Westphalia, Germany

The AnimagiC is a German annual anime convention with currently about 12,000 visitors.

== History ==
From the first event in the summer of 1999 through 2005 the AnimagiC took place in the Rhein-Mosel-Halle at Koblenz, Germany. Due to a growing number of visitors the event spread to a growing number of additional premises. By 2005 it additionally spanned the Kurfürstliches Schloss, two cinemas and a Koblenz discothèque named "Circus Maximus".

In 2006 the event was relocated to the Beethovenhalle in Bonn as Koblenz no longer could provide sufficient capacity for the increasing number of visitors.

Since 2017 the event takes place in the Rosengarten in Mannheim.

== Agenda ==
The agenda of the three-day-long event includes Japanese pop culture (Japanese rock music, visual kei, cosplay), video rooms, a cinema program, a traders room, bring and buy stands, show acts, Japanese guests, role-playing games, drawing courses, concerts, and much more.

The guests of honor who attend the event every year include well-known people (graphic artists, directors, etc.) from different animation studios, Japanese manga artists and singers. Among the most renowned guests was Tadashi Ozawa (free animator for Nausicaä of the Valley of the Wind, The Castle in the Sky, Akira und Record of Lodoss War) who from 2000 to 2006 held drawing workshops for selected visitors.

== Scale ==
The total number of visitors of the three-day event currently is around 12,000. Contrary to widespread assertions AnimagiC is not the largest anime convention in Europe; this record is held by the Japan Expo at Paris, France that annually takes place at the beginning of July and attracts over 230,000 visitors followed by the DoKomi in Düsseldorf, Germany attracting about 140,000 visitors in 2023. The Salón del Manga de Barcelona in Barcelona, Spain, takes place annually at the end of October or beginning of November and counts over 112,000 visitors.
