= List of Bakuman episodes =

Cover of the first DVD release of Bakuman.'s first season.

The Bakuman anime series is based on the manga series of the same name, written by Tsugumi Ohba and illustrated by Takeshi Obata. The anime is directed by Ken'ichi Kasai, animated by J.C.Staff, and produced by NHK. The episodes follow Moritaka Mashiro and Akito Takagi as they attempt to create a popular manga to be made into an anime.

A 25-episode anime television series aired between October 2, 2010, and April 2, 2011, on the television network NHK. In March 2011, airing was delayed one week due to the 2011 Tōhoku earthquake and tsunami. A second season aired 25 episodes between October 1, 2011, and March 24, 2012. A third season began airing on October 6, 2012, and ended on March 30, 2013, after 25 episodes.

The first season uses three pieces of music: one opening theme and two ending themes. The opening theme is "Blue Bird" by Kobukuro. The first ending theme is "Bakurock: Mirai no Rinkakusen" (Bakurock 〜未来の輪郭線〜, "Bakurock: Outline the Future") by Ya-kyim, and the second ending theme is "Genjitsu to Iu Na no Kaibutsu to Tatakau Monotachi (現実という名の怪物と戦う者たち, "Those Who Fight the Monster Known as Reality") by Yu Takahashi. The second season also has three pieces of music: one opening theme and two ending themes. The opening theme is "Dream of Life" by Shuhei Itou. The first ending is "Monochrome Rainbow" by Tommy heavenly6 and the second ending is "Parallel=" (パラレル=) by Fumiya Sashida. The third season has four pieces of music: two opening themes and two ending themes. The first opening theme is "Moshimo no Hanashi" (もしもの話) by Nano Ripe and the second opening is "23:40" by Hyadain feat. Base Ball Bear. The first ending theme is "Pride on Everyday" by Sphere and the second ending theme is "Yume Sketch" by JAM Project.

The series uses also several themes for fictional anime series:

1. "Chou Hero Densetsu" by Hironobu Kageyama, opening of "Super Hero Legend" (season 1);
2. "Faker Trick" by Mai Kotone, opening of "Detective Trap" (season 2);
3. "Crow's Sky" by Shuhei Kita, opening of "Crow" (season 2);
4. "Frame in Flame" by Oldcodex, opening of "Reversi" (season 3).

== Episode list ==
=== Season 1 ===
No.	Title	Original airdate
1	"Dreams and Reality"; Transliteration: "Yume to Genjitsu" (Japanese: 夢と現実)	October 2, 2010
Moritaka Mashiro, an average student with a talent for drawing, forgets his notebook at school, where his classmate Akito Takagi finds and looks through it. Takagi likes his drawings and asks Mashiro to team up with him to create a best-selling manga. Mashiro refuses because his uncle was a manga artist until he died, from suicide Mashiro presumes, while deeply in debt, which derails his dream. Takagi soon invites him to visit Miho Azuki, the girl Mashiro has an unrequited crush on, and Takagi tells her of his plan to create a manga that will become an anime, in which she will voice the heroine. Mashiro also proposes to marry Azuki when both their dreams come true, and she agrees that they will, but shall not see each other until then. With this motivation, Mashiro decides to become a manga artist.
2	"Dumb and Smart"; Transliteration: "Baka to Rikō" (Japanese: 馬鹿と利口)	October 9, 2010
Mashiro chats with Takagi, who tells him that he chose Mashiro because he is smarter than many of his peers in matters outside of scholarship, and that he believes Azuki has a similar kind of intelligence, with the ability to be appealing to others. Mashiro tells Takagi that he believes his uncle committed suicide, and thus suspects that his parents will oppose him becoming a manga artist. Mashiro's mother says his uncle did not commit suicide, but still opposes his decision until his father and grandfather show support for his dream. Mashiro's grandfather gives him his deceased uncle's studio apartment, and Mashiro brings Takagi to see it.
3	"Parent and Child"; Transliteration: "Oya to Ko" (Japanese: 親と子)	October 16, 2010
Mashiro and Takagi arrive at Mashiro's uncle's apartment, where they look around and Mashiro shows Takagi the manuscripts and storyboards, that the author of a manga series produces before drawing it. Mashiro realizes that his uncle was working extremely hard until his death and vows to approach it with the same resolve. Mashiro and Takagi find letters between his uncle and his friend from childhood, which stop before his hit manga was serialized, and looking at a yearbook photo of her, realize that he had been in love with Azuki's mother. They go to visit Azuki's mother the next day, and learn that she was also in love with him, but never could admit it and fell in love with someone else. Mashiro asks Azuki's mother not to tell her about the relationship between her and his uncle, and he then sets out to make a manga.
4	"Time and Key"; Transliteration: "Toki to Kagi" (Japanese: 時と鍵)	October 23, 2010
Mashiro shows Takagi all that he has drawn and points out all the mistakes he has made, as well as the finer points of using tools for drawing manga. When Takagi questions him, Mashiro tells him about G-Pens and Kabura pens, making manuscripts, and Taro Kawaguchi's three rules to a successful manga: conceit, doing your best, and luck. When they go to a convenience store, Takagi notices that the latest issue of Jack has a semi-finalist named Eiji Nizuma, a fifteen-year-old manga creator. The two discuss their high schools, manga, and editors, thus coming to the conclusion that they would finish the manuscript for a manga by summer's end and show it to an editor of Jack. While walking home with Takagi, Mashiro encounters Azuki by chance; while the two are unable to look at each other as they pass, they both turn back to look.
5	"Summer and Name"; Transliteration: "Natsu to Nēmu" (Japanese: 夏とネーム)	October 30, 2010
Recalling when he and Azuki turned back to look at each other at the same time, Mashiro tells Takagi that he and Azuki have been on the same frequency for years, indicating that they are connected without having to say anything about it. Azuki's best friend Kaya Miyoshi goes to Takagi to complain about him telling Azuki about her dream, and as she does so, gives indications of romantic interest in Takagi that Mashiro and Miyoshi notice. During the summer, Mashiro and Takagi stay at Mashiro's uncle's office, and work on a manga called The Two Earths. When it is complete, they call Shōnen Jack's editorial department.
6	"Candy and Whip"; Transliteration: "Ame to Muchi" (Japanese: アメとムチ)	November 6, 2010
Mashiro and Takagi meet with Akira Hattori, one of the editors at Shōnen Jack. He notes that their work has flaws, as it is too text-driven and not drawn in manga style, but they have potential. He tells them that they are better suited to figuring out what could be a hit and drawing that, rather than drawing what they want, and while they are less likely to get a smash hit with that skillset, they are more likely to follow up on one if they do. Hattori gives them his contact information, encouraging them to come to him with their work. At school, the teacher decides to seat boys and girls next to each other, resulting in Mashiro sitting next to Azuki. Takagi, in the meantime, is forcing himself to hold back laughter; Mashiro and Azuki are both worried their stomachs might make odd sounds from their embarrassment.
7	"Tears and Tears"; Transliteration: "Namida to Namida" (Japanese: 涙と涙)	November 13, 2010
After meeting with Hattori, Mashiro and Takagi continue working on new submissions, and Mashiro writes notes to Azuki in class. Azuki cries after Mashiro asks her if they have to wait to be together until they have fulfilled their dreams, and she gives him her email. Mashiro is anxious to submit a work for the Tezuka Award so that Azuki can smile again, but Takagi suggests that they should proceed more cautiously and make their manga as good as it can be. Hattori calls them, and tells them that the work they submitted did not even make it to the finalists, but Takagi and Mashiro resolve to keep trying and go for the next Tezuka award, much to Hattori's pleasure. Nizuma receives a visit from his editor and the editor in chief, and agrees to move to Tokyo to write his manga if he gets the right to cancel one series after becoming the top-ranked manga artist.
8	"Anxiety and Expectation"; Transliteration: "Fuan to Kitai" (Japanese: 不安と期待)	November 20, 2010
Takagi comes up with some more ideas, including One Hundred Millionth, a story about people being ranked according to their abilities, and Hattori is impressed with the story, causing Mashiro to wonder if his art is good enough. The story is chosen as one of the finalists, but does not make it to the four chosen for the award or honorable mentions. Shortly afterward, Ishizawa, a classmate, claims that Mashiro's art is holding Takagi down. Takagi gets angry and punches Ishizawa.
9	"Regrets and Understanding"; Transliteration: "Kōkai to Nattoku" (Japanese: 後悔と納得)	November 27, 2010
Takagi is suspended for a week after punching Ishizawa, causing Mashiro to worry about him. He goes over to visit Takagi and learns that the story ideas he submitted to him were only a few of the ones he came up with. Mashiro then learns that Miyoshi and Aiko Iwase, the second best student in his grade, both have feelings for Takagi. Takagi tells them that he likes them both, but cannot be in a relationship with either due to his manga career. Iwase tells him to quit writing manga and leaves, while Miyoshi promises to support him. Miyoshi gets angry after Takagi admits that he only spoke to her to get information about Azuki for Mashiro, and Mashiro leaves with his determination restored.
10	"10 and 2"; Transliteration: "Jū to Ni" (Japanese: 10と2)	December 4, 2010
Mashiro and Takagi meet with Hattori, who says the manga artists liked their work, but the editors judging it thought it would never be published. Mashiro, wanting to progress faster than he is now, wonders if he could submit a work for serialization, and Hattori is doubtful. The editor in chief says that work needs to be good to be serialized, but Mashiro and Takagi are not good enough yet, and need a good main character to do so. Their early attempts are unimpressive, but Hattori suggests that a cult hit that only 20 percent of the reader base would read, but consider their favorite, might be a way for Mashiro and Takagi to get first place. Takagi mentions an idea he has called Money and Intelligence, in which people sell the contents of their minds to others, and Hattori suggests that they work on it.
11	"Chocolate and NEXT!"; Transliteration: "Choko to NEXT!" (Japanese: チョコとNEXT!)	December 11, 2010
Mashiro and Takagi work on Money and Intelligence while applying to the relatively easy North High School. Miyoshi questions why Mashiro and Azuki are not seeing each other, and Takagi concludes that Azuki wants to remain focused on her dream. Mashiro and Takagi get accepted into North High School along with Miyoshi and learn that their work will run in the seasonal magazine NEXT. Hattori tells them that the editors are planning to use them to make Nizuma look good by comparison, but he tells them this is their chance to impress them and win against Nizuma.
12	"Feast and Graduation"; Transliteration: "Gochisō to Sotsugyō" (Japanese: 御馳走と卒業)	December 18, 2010
After celebrating by eating out, Hattori, Takagi and Mashiro discuss Money and Intelligence, and what changes they need to make to it. Hattori says that they should wait until graduating from high school to go for serialization, and that even Nizuma is going for it too early. Miyoshi tells Takagi that Azuki is moving and hopes that she will see Mashiro at least once before she does. Mashiro insists on keeping to their promise despite not knowing how long it will take until he is able to fulfill it, but meets with Azuki on the way home from the graduation ceremony. He asks how long she will wait, and she promises to wait forever, pleasing him.
13	"Early Results and the Real Deal"; Transliteration: "Sokuhō to Honchan" (Japanese: 速報と本ちゃん)	December 25, 2010
Mashiro, at Miyoshi's suggestion, sends an email to Azuki to begin correspondence with her. During the first day of high school, Mashiro and Takagi submit their new pseudonym, "Muto Ashirogi". Hattori is impressed with their work, but Mashiro notices that he is not expecting Money and Intelligence to be serialized, wondering if it is because of his desire that they wait until after high school to get serialized. Money And Intelligence gets first place in the early results of the NEXT polls, but drops to third place in the actual results, with Nizuma's work getting half the votes. This development convinces Mashiro and Takagi that they must make a mainstream work to go for first place, and resolve to make one better than their previous efforts.
14	"Battles and Copying"; Transliteration: "Batoru to Mosha" (Japanese: バトルと模写)	January 8, 2011
Mashiro has come to the conclusion that doing mainstream battle manga is the way forward, and draws characters from other battle manga to polish his skills at drawing this type of manga, Meanwhile Nizuma's manga "Yellow Hit" is on the verge of being serialized, but Nizuma's editor learns that he is planning on submitting "Crow" instead, and brings him down to the editorial offices. At the same time, Mashiro and Takagi are meeting with Hattori, who tells them that they are not suited to mainstream manga and that the mainstream authors who are popular are considerably more talented. Nizuma meets Mashiro and Takagi, telling them that he liked Money And Intelligence and wants to be friends with them, before drawing a name in front of them. Hattori hopes that demonstration will convince them that they're not able to compete with him in mainstream manga, but they remain determined to do so, and he gives them six months to submit a good mainstream work before he steps down as their editor.
15	"Debut and Impatience"; Transliteration: "Debyū to Aseri" (Japanese: デビューと焦り)	January 15, 2011
Hattori goes over the weaknesses of Mashiro and Takagi's storyboard, and tells them that they need good characters, simple yet exciting battles, cute heroines, and tragedy and humor to make a good storyboard. Nizuma admits that he wrote the name on the spot, rather than having it in his head, and Mashiro and Takagi realize that he is a "genius" who can draw what he wants. Nizuma tells his editor that he likes the passion in Mashiro and Takagi's eyes, and sees them as his rivals. Meanwhile, Azuki auditions for Saint Visual Girls' Academy, a midnight anime, and gets a bit part. Mashiro, seeing her progressing toward her dream, becomes somewhat impatient and asks her to continue waiting for him, and she promises to do so while telling him to stop sending emails like that.
16	"Wall and Kiss"; Transliteration: "Kabe to Kisu" (Japanese: 壁とキス)	January 22, 2011
Mashiro and Takagi, incorporating Hattori's suggestions, comes up with a concept for a story about an angel fighting other angels who kill humans to advance themselves, but are frustrated at their lack of progress. The name is rejected, but the feedback notes that they have promise. Around this time, Takagi is struggling to think of another idea, and begins seeing Miyoshi more often, prompting Mashiro to wonder if he is working on it at all. Hattori learns that Nizuma needs an assistant and that Takagi would not stop Mashiro from going to work for him. Mashiro hears of the offer, and decides to accept it, thinking he might pick up something that would help him and Takagi move forward. Just as he decides that, he happens to see Takagi and Miyoshi kissing in a park.
17	"Conceit and Kindness"; Transliteration: "Tengu to Shinsetsu" (Japanese: 天狗と親切)	January 29, 2011
Mashiro starts work as an assistant for Nizuma, and meets the other two assistants; Shinta Fukuda, who had placed lower than he did in NEXT, and Takurō Nakai, who won an award 10 years ago, but has been unable to accomplish anything noteworthy since then. Despite Fukuda and Nizuma questioning why he is working as an assistant instead of trying to get published, Mashiro is determined to learn what he can to help Takagi. Fukuda realizes that "Crow" will eventually get canceled after the novelty wears off if Nizuma does not make it more substantial and interesting. Nizuma adjusts the story accordingly, while also deciding to meet with his editor.
18	"Jealousy and Love"; Transliteration: "Shitto to Ai" (Japanese: 嫉妬と愛)	February 5, 2011
While reworking Chapter 5, Fukuda reveals that he is dissatisfied with many aspects of Jack, particularly how series are ordered by their popularity, but Yujiro tells him to get serialized before he talks about changing Jack. Nizuma tells Mashiro that he has been drawing since he was young, when his family had no money for video games, and Mashiro remembers how he also was drawing all the time before his uncle died. Mashiro, remembering his passion for manga, resigns as Nizuma's assistant and goes home, where he looks through his old manga, and decides to write a mystery next. Meanwhile, Takagi is writing cell phone novels for Miyoshi to publish, causing Mashiro to wonder if he is working on the name at all. Mashiro notices the contrast between Takagi's relationship with Miyoshi and his own relationship with Azuki, and wondering if the distance between them is increasing, asks why she is willing to accept not seeing him. After some thought, Azuki responds that she believes her love will be greater once they fulfill their promise, and Mashiro resolves to create a manga for her, by himself if necessary.
19	"Two and One"; Transliteration: "Futari to Hitori" (Japanese: 2人と1人)	February 12, 2011
Summer ends without Mashiro hearing back from Takagi, and Takagi returns the key to Mashiro's uncle's apartment, apologizing for failing to come up with a name in time but tells he's still resolved to become a manga story writer. Mashiro meets with Hattori, who is impressed with his idea of a detective who cons criminals into exposing themselves, but doubts he can succeed without Takagi's help. Hattori learns that Takagi is also intending to make a mystery, but does not reveal Mashiro's story to him until another editor asks Mashiro to illustrate a runner-up for Story King. Hattori then plans for Mashiro and Takagi to work on their detective story for two years before it gets serialized, without having either tell the other. Mashiro struggles to write a storyboard on his own, but Takagi approaches him and shows him five storyboards, one of which is a detective story. Mashiro and Takagi decide to work together again, and to work on their detective story for the next six months.
20	"Cooperation and Conditions"; Transliteration: "Kyōryoku to Jōken" (Japanese: 協力と条件)	February 19, 2011
Mashiro and Takagi discuss how to improve the concept behind the story, now known as Detective Trap, and Takagi begins looking over many detective stories that Hattori sent him. The two meet with Hattori, insisting on proceeding with Detective Trap while still in high school, and Hattori tells them that in order to get serialized, Detective Trap must do well in the Golden Cup competition, and they must bring him a 19-page story every two weeks to show that they can do so every week with assistants. They succeed in keeping up in spite of the difficulty involved in doing so, and are officially entered into the contest.
21	"Literature and Music"; Transliteration: "Bungaku to Ongaku" (Japanese: 文学と音楽)	February 26, 2011
Mashiro and Takagi continue submitting a story every two weeks, with Mashiro sacrificing sleep to do so, but they have several weeks to go. They see Nakai with Ko Aoki, the runner-up of the Story King competition. Nakai reveals that he's entering- with her, and that Fukuda's entry is expected to place first. Hattori reveals that Muto Ashirogi's work has gotten into the Golden Future Cup, and while the rank influences how it will fare, so will the number of people who voted that they liked it. One of their rivals is Koji "Koogy" Makaino, a popular musician who wishes to become a manga artist, and Fukuda believes that his fans will give him an unfair advantage in the questionnaires. Fukuda, Nakai, Mashiro and Takagi then go to the editorial offices to protest this.
22	"Solidarity and Breakdown"; Transliteration: "Danketsu to Ketsuretsu" (Japanese: 団結と決裂)	March 5, 2011
Team Fukuda reaches the editorial offices, but despite their protests, the editors do not believe Koogy's advantage is unfair or his tactics are unethical, and Mashiro decides to defeat him by making a better manga. Fukuda then proposes that the authors check each other's names, and they are surprised by each other's level of skill. Midway through the session, Aoki refuses to continue to participate, saying that her manga is better than the others, and the session ends with Nizuma says two of the manga are slightly better than the third, but declining to specify. Mashiro then ponders rewriting the name in the face of his competition, and after getting an email from Miho discussing her doing singing again and her becoming more confident, decides to do so.
23	"Tuesday and Friday"; Transliteration: "Kayō to Kinyō" (Japanese: 火曜と金曜)	March 19, 2011
Mashiro and Takagi both decide to rewrite their manga. Fukuda, Aoki and Nakai also rewrite their manga. Later Fukuda's manga is shown first with positive reviews. Next Mashiro and Takagi's manga is also shown with good reviews. Nakai panics and thinks that when Nizuma said that the winners were tied and there was a third place, he meant his manga. Then Aoki and Nakai's manga is shown with also positive reviews. All three series are okayed to begin work on names for serialization. Azuki said that she liked Mashiro and Takagi's manga, which gives Mashiro hope.
24	"Call and Eve"; Transliteration: "Denwa to Zenya" (Japanese: 電話と前夜)	March 26, 2011
Koogy's manga does poorly in the Golden Future Cup, leaving Mashiro and Takagi, Fukuda, and Nakai and Aoki as the top contenders. An unprecedented two-way tie happens, with Fukuda and Ashirogi Muto both getting first place. Azuki calls Takagi to thank him for supporting Mashiro and encouraging him to pursue becoming a manga artist, but is too embarrassed to congratulate Mashiro directly herself. Having won the Golden Future Cup, Mashiro and Takagi prepare to submit their story for serialization.
25	"Yes and No"; Transliteration: "Ari to Nashi" (Japanese: ありとなし)	April 2, 2011
Thirteen series are submitted for the serialization meeting and are discussed by the team captains, editor in chief and deputy editor. Of all 13, Detective Trap and Otter 11, a manga by newcomer Kazuya Hiramaru, are chosen for serialization. Mashiro receives congratulations from his rivals, who promise to get serialized themselves to compete with him. Mashiro then reflects on how far he has come and how far he has yet to go, before he receives a call from Azuki, who congratulates him and tells him that their dream will come true. Hattori stops by with a man called Miura, who will be their new editor.

=== Season 2 ===
No.	Title	Original airdate
1	"Silence and Party"; Transliteration: "Chinmoku to Utage" (Japanese: 沈黙と宴)	October 1, 2011
The story picks up directly where the Season 1 finale episode left, introducing Miura as Moritaka and Takagi's new editor and introducing the genius, yet extremely lazy ex-salary man, Hiramaru at the New Year's Party.
2	"Anthology and Photograph Collection"; Transliteration: "Bunshū to Shashinshū" (Japanese: 文集と写真集)	October 8, 2011
Mashiro and Takagi get to know their new assistants, while Azuki struggles with her decision to do an ecchi photo shoot which will boost her popularity a lot. When Mashiro receives an e-mail from Azuki, he is left shocked by what she's decided; if he's okay with it, she wants him to see her naked first so he won't mind if photos of her in a swimsuit are taken. Worried, Mashiro neglects his storyboard to go visit her and talk things through. Takagi calls her and explains what's happening. Shocked to hear what Mashiro is about to do, she finally contacts him to talk about it and he tells her he doesn't want her to do the photo shoot. They decide to go to the beach some day and take photos themselves.
3	"Window and Snow"; Transliteration: "Mado to Yuki" (Japanese: 窓と雪)	October 15, 2011
Nakai vows to do whatever it takes to renew his partnership with Aoki, showing his determination to an extreme extent, worrying Mashiro, Fukuda and the rest. In the end it does pay off and Aoki agrees to form a team once again.
4	"Support and Patience"; Transliteration: "Teko to Gaman" (Japanese: テコと我慢)	October 22, 2011
As TRAP's ranking continues dropping, Mashiro and Takagi consider some major changes. In the end Miura tells them they do not have to resort to drastic changes, they should focus on continuing a real detective manga instead. Takagi wants to protest but Mashiro convinces him and tells him he thinks it's their best chance to get better in the rankings too.
5	"Joke and News"; Transliteration: "Boke to Nyūsu" (Japanese: ボケとニュース)	October 29, 2011
Their earlier decision pays off as TRAP begins to move in the rankings, but the competition gets very fierce. Overwork is slowly taking its toll on Mashiro, especially when he is asked to draw a colored page for their first manga volume promotion.
6	"Disease and Drive"; Transliteration: "Byōki to Yaruki" (Japanese: 病気とやる気)	November 5, 2011
In the end Mashiro faints and is hospitalized, but he refuses to stop drawing even in his current condition. Despite Mashiro and Takagi's wish to continue, TRAP is put on hiatus. Azuki visits Mashiro in the hospital. She talks about how she liked him ever since she was a child and they talks about a special day at the pool during middle school. While Mashiro is convinced he can continue to draw, but Takagi is hesitating because of his current condition. In the end, Azuki is the one who supports Mashiro to do what he really wants to do, surprising Takagi and Miura by her decision.
7	"Life-and-Death and Standstill"; Transliteration: "Seishi to Seishi" (Japanese: 生死と静止)	November 12, 2011
The chief editor decides to put "TRAP" on hiatus until Mashiro and Takagi's graduation. He decided to do so because of Mashiro's uncle, whom many thought to have died from overworking himself, as he does not want the past to repeat itself. As the editors hear of the hiatus and reason why, most disagree with the idea but figure they can't do much about it. When Fukuda hears of the reason he gets furious and begins a boycott, including Nizuma, Hirumaru and the Aoki & Nakai team. They all decide to put their work on hiatus too until TRAP will be published again.
8	"Recall and Call"; Transliteration: "Rikōru to Kōru" (Japanese: リコールとコール)	November 19, 2011
The boycott is still in full effect but the chief editor hasn't changed his mind. Meanwhile Mashiro and Azuki continue their still awkward yet happy meetings in the hospital. Seeing how hard Mashiro and Takagi work, Miura makes one last desperate plea to sway the chief into resuming TRAP but he ultimately fails. In the end Mashiro and Takagi show the chief the work they have done so far, managing to convince him with their guts.
9	"Resumption and Low Rank"; Transliteration: "Saikai to Kai" (Japanese: 再開と下位)	November 26, 2011
In the end TRAP resumes publication, but is struggling with low rankings. Takagi tries to put some ideas based on fan mails in the name but Miura tells him he can't use whatever idea and add it to the story, because then it wouldn't be their manga anymore. Meanwhile, Azuki gets more and more popular, getting a semi-regular role in an anime. In the end TRAP is ultimately cancelled due to the low rankings, together with Aoki's & Nakai's Hideout Door. Mashiro and Takagi finish TRAP and are frustrated they weren't able to do better and realize they won't be able to get an anime before they're 18. Mashiro tells Azuki about this and she tells him she'll wait for him forever but would like to get married by the time she's 40. Not wanting to make Azuki wait that long, Mashiro and Takagi get fired up again to do their best with their next manga.
10	"Gag and Serious"; Transliteration: "Gyagu to Shiriasu" (Japanese: ギャグとシリアス)	December 3, 2011
The team must decide which genre to choose for their new manga. Miura urges them to draw a gag manga, but Mashiro and Takagi aren't sure they're fit for gag manga and prefer something more serious which is their forte. In the end they decide to create two new serialization storyboards, one funny one to Miura's liking and one more serious one, more to their liking. They show both Hitman 10 and Two of Me to Miura, who tells them to try to get Hitman 10 serialized. This causes Mashiro to feel like this editor really is a "miss" since according to him, Two of Me is a lot better. In the end it's revealed Ashirogi Muto submitted Future Watch behind his back in the newbie contest, the Monthly Awards, in order to get all the editors, higher-ups and especially the manga artist judge, Niizuma, to read it.
11	"Manga and Youth"; Transliteration: "Manga to Seishun" (Japanese: マンガと青春)	December 10, 2011
Both of Ashirogi Mutos' works Future Watch and Hitman 10 are well received by the editorial staff. The chief decides to run both as one-shots, wanting to see the public reaction before making a decision on a possible serialization. Mashiro and Takagi aren't sure about their new editor and his skills, and this gets worse when Takahama calls them because his manga Business Boy Kenichi ranked 6th as series while it got 2nd place as one-shot, telling them not to listen to Miura too much and do things in their won style because taking Miura's advise made him fall down in the rankings. In the end Hitman 10 ranks 10th, while Future Watch ranks 9th.
12	"Experience and Data"; Transliteration: "Keiken to Dēta" (Japanese: 経験とデータ)	December 17, 2011
Miura's data research concludes that the team should focus on a gag manga because they're steadier in the rankings but Mashiro and Takagi are still not sure about it, especially Mashiro. During a meeting Miura pushes them to do it while Mashiro keeps declining the idea, stating gag doesn't suit Takagi's writing style and his art style at all. Miura tells him he shouldn't decide things on his own, since Takagi isn't really against the idea, and tells Mashiro to work on his artstyle or to let Takagi have another artist do the artwork. Upon hearing this Takagi snaps and tell Miura "they can't work with someone like him" and both of them leave. While on their way to the studio, Mashiro tells Takagi he doesn't mind doing a gag manga as much but he was happy Takagi defended him. Later that evening they receive several boxes Miura sent earlier, containting material about gag manga, and Mashiro and Takagi realize how passionate Miura is about gag manga. When he comes over to apologize they tell him it'd be fine to do a gag manga.
13	"Alliance and Classmates"; Transliteration: "Dōmei to Dōkyū" (Japanese: 同盟と同級)	December 24, 2011
After confirming to do a gag manga with Miura, Takagi goes to the zoo to get some inspiration for his next heroine. There he meets Aoki and they decide to exchange information about the way guys and girls think and experience things, helping each other out as fellow manga artists. Because of their constant phone calls, Miyoshi always gets the "busy signal" when she tries to call Takagi, making her a little suspicious. After Aoki, Takagi, and Iwase all meet at the zoo, Takagi receives a book from Iwase which she wrote herself. When Takagi isn't upset about her winning a prize and refuses to compare his work with hers, she angrily declares she will become a manga story writer as well. When Miyoshi finds Iwase's novel at the studio and a hidden letter inside, she leaves the office in tears.
14	"Distrust and Trust"; Transliteration: "Fushin to Shin'yō" (Japanese: 不信と信用)	January 7, 2012
Mashiro and Takagi finish their manuscript and submit it to NEXT. Miyoshi is still thinking about what happened, and decides to call Azuki, who in turn decides to call Takagi. After Takagi fails to explain what really is going on, she attempts to get more information out of Mashiro. After questioning Mashiro on whether or not he has been honest with her, she hangs up, leaving Mashiro thinking he has been dumped.
15	"Monkeys and Marriage"; Transliteration: "Saru to Kekkon" (Japanese: 猿と結婚)	January 14, 2012
Takagi and Miyoshi blame themselves over the fact their fight has caused a rift between Mashiro and Azuki. Because Mashiro and Azuki are too stubborn to apologize to one another, Takagi decides to explain everything to Miyoshi at the zoo. The meeting is complicated when Takagi runs into an upset Aoki just as Miyoshi arrives. In an effort to get Miyoshi to stay, Takagi proposes to her and she accepts after Aoki explains everything. In the end Miyoshi allows Takagi and Aoki to keep contact at the condition she and Aoki will become friends too. They invite Azuki to tea and she mails Mashiro that she forgives him, much to his confusion.
16	"Prince and Saviour"; Transliteration: "Ōji to Kyūseishu" (Japanese: 王子と救世主)	January 21, 2012
Aoki asks Nakai to draw the art for her new manga but he states he only will on the condition she will go out with him, angering her to the point she slaps him. Afterwards she continues her in search for someone to help her draw sufficient panty shots in order for her manga to have a more "shōnen" feel to it, but isn't able to find anyone suitable. After many events, Fukuda ends up offering his help, since his manga Kiyoshi Knight is doing so well due to his own well-drawn panty shots. Aoki is hesitant to accept his help but under the circumstances she has little choice but to accept it in the end.
17	"Special Relationship and Hometown"; Transliteration: "Tokubetsu na Naka to Inaka" (Japanese: 特別な仲と田舎)	January 28, 2012
Takagi and Mashiro's new manga Tanto doesn't get serialized but Miura tells them they just have to make it better for the next meeting. "Business Boy Kenichi" gets canceled, leaving Nakai jobless. After being rejected twice he reflects on his behavior and decides to go back home. Mashiro tries to stop him but Nakai won't budge, not even when Fukuda and Aoki show up. Later, Takahama asks for a different editor because Miura won't let him draw what he wants but the chief editor refuses, saying that if his work is good enough, the editor will be forced to accept it, making Takagi and Mashiro realize the same thing. Niizuma becomes the artist for Aiko Iwase's manuscript while promising he'll continue CROW and not let the quality drop, though he states he'll only do it on the condition it'll be serialized, which Hattori (who will be the editor of the new manga) is confident about. Worried how the higher ups will react about Niizuma running two series, Hattori asks him to change the art style a bit and use a pen name until it passes the committee.
18	"Complaint and Roar"; Transliteration: "Monku to Ikkatsu" (Japanese: 文句と一喝)	February 4, 2012
Miura gets worried when he hears the positive reactions about the "newbie" manga artist who drew the storyboard for MONEY's. Takagi and Mashiro find out that Aiko Iwase is the story writer, fueling their competitive feelings. Aiko pays Takagi a visit, asking him to acknowledge her if she ends up being more popular, which he promises but only talent wise. He tells her he and Miyoshi are engaged. The committee finds out about Niizuma being the artist for MONEY's but can't deny its quality. In the end Hirameki Tanto-kun finally gets serialized but Niizuma's new manga +Natural does so as well. Takagi also gets invited to Miyoshi's house regarding her parents approval for their marriage. As Team Fukuda hears about Niizuma's double serialization they have a meeting with a short interruptance of Iwase. When they visit Niizuma and ask him why he took up the job of the second manga, Niizuma declares he draws because he wants to and no one is allowed to whine about it until they make a better manga, reverting to his normal self afterwards.
19	"Fate and Star"; Transliteration: "En to Hoshi" (Japanese: 縁と星)	February 11, 2012
Takagi goes to Miyoshi's house to announce their engagement to her parents. The two families have surprising connection and everything goes well between them. Later, the pair attends a party where Niizuma's second series motivates them as rivals. Takagi is feeling more and more pressure as Otters, Hiramaru's manga, gets an anime series. Tanto's release follows that of +Natural (Iwase and Niizuma's new manga), and to their disappointment, it does not beat +Natural's second chapter in the rankings. Iwase suddenly claims she has a crush on Hattori and out of the blue, Niizuma announces he's not reading Ashirogi Muto's manga anymore...
20	"Love and Rejection"; Transliteration: "Daisuki to Hitei" (Japanese: 大好きと否定)	February 18, 2012
It's time for Takagi and Miyoshi's wedding. Mashiro is still unsure if Tanto fits their style and ends up arguing with Hattori, who refuses to give his opinion about their manga. In the end Mashiro gets Hattori to admit he thinks their manga isn't good but he also tells him he still thinks they can beat Niizuma. When Niizuma declares on TV that Ashirogi Muto is his number one rival, Mashiro has a breakdown. He runs home and calls Azuki, saying he wants to quit Tanto because he wants to aim higher, because he wants to compete with Niizuma. Mashiro talks about it with Takagi and they decide to quit Tanto. The chief editor tells them to quit the company if they behave like this but Mashiro states his wish to beat Niizuma but that he's unable to do so with Tanto. The chief asks Takagi if he thinks they can beat Niizuma with a different work, so Takagi declares they'll submit something to the following 3 serialization meetings that can compete with Niizuma's work. If they fail to do so, their contract will be terminated.
21	"Selfishness and Advice"; Transliteration: "Wagamama to Adobaisu" (Japanese: わがままとアドバイス)	February 25, 2012
Mashiro and Takagi try hard to come up with good names for their new serie. Miura tells them they should work on a serious darker manga, like Money and Intelligence, so they decide to create an edited and more complicated version of their earlier manga, naming it Money, Intelligence and Appearance (aka KTM) which is also incredibly deep. However, it is not accepted for serialization. For the next meeting they are pushed by Miura to seriously attempt writing a mainstream fantasy manga with a simple setting, unlike KTM, against their own ideas. While they feel a "standard battle manga" isn't working for them, Miyoshi states the manga is enjoyable and that the simple setting is good for a change. In the end that manga gets rejected too, leaving them with one last chance.
22	"Hint and Best"; Transliteration: "Hinto to Besuto" (Japanese: ヒントとベスト)	March 3, 2012
Takagi is struggling with the new story and asks Mashiro to come with him to get some inspiration and they decide to tail Hattori for a day. They have a fun day trying to tail him without getting caught and end up listening to the high hope that Hattori has for them. Though he couldn't tell them directly, Hattori confesses his feelings to his fellow editors. Moved upon hearing this, the two go back with fueled ambition and a great idea for a manga; a crime manga with serious humor. For Azuki's birthday, Mashiro sends her a drawing of her and receives a rare phone call directly from Azuki.
23	"Winning and Losing"; Transliteration: "Kachi to Make" (Japanese: 勝ちと負け)	March 10, 2012
Miura reads the storyboard for the new manga Perfect Crime Club and approves of it. Takamta also reads the storyboard, admitting theirs is a lot better compared to his, leaving Mashiro and Takagi more confident about their new manga. They celebrate Christmas with Miyoshi but are still anxious about the meeting, deciding that if they don't make it they will continue being manga artists for another magazine. In the serialization meeting everyone seems to be positive about Perfect Crime Club but the chief editor asks them if it could seriously compete with CROW and +Natural. In the end he suggest they vote if the manga should be serialized, and the episode ends with the negative result 4–3 against the serialization...
24	"Imagination and Presentation"; Transliteration: "Hyōgenryoku to Sōzōryoku" (Japanese: 表現力と想像力)	March 17, 2012
Editor Oonishi, changes his vote to be positive, stating it's ridiculous to let Ashirogi Muto go because of this voting. The vice chief editor also changes his vote, stating they should leave it up to the readers to decide this matter. In the end the manga gets serialized. Mashiro, Takagi and Miyoshi receive the good news and eat home made cake from Azuki. They find a USB in the cake and listen to her special recorded Christmas carol. Mashiro and Takagi's editor changes again but it turns out to be Hattori, while Miura becomes the editor for +Natural. Hattori tells them about the initial voting result, triggering a brainstorm session where they discuss what they should change to make the manga even better. Hattori thinks it's Niizuma's 'expressiveness' that makes his manga so good but Mashiro changes it to 'imagination'. Mashiro decides to, just like Niizuma, draw the manga based on only Takagi's script (instead of his storyboards), giving him more freedom to draw the panels as he wants. Both of them start to rewrite the storyboard. Meanwhile Fukuda tells his editor he's working on a one shot, saying he doesn't want to lose against Niizuma and Ashirogi Muto.
25	"Votes and Charts"; Transliteration: "Hyō to Hyō" (Japanese: 票と表)	March 24, 2012
Mashiro changes the character design while Takagi struggles with naming the 3 characters and a possible new title. Orihara comes back as assistant + 2 new ones: Moriya and Shiratori. Those 2 argue if sales or treating it like an art is better for a manga. Mashiro tells them he and Takagi draw with sales in their minds, because they're not yet good enough to draw something that has true cultural value, saying that everyone should draw the way they want to. Takagi decides on the title; "Perfect Crime Party", aka "PCP". Meanwhile Fukuda is working on Road Racer Buchigiri. Everyone is curious how the votes will be with PCP as a story based manga against the intense and flashy Road Racer. In the end "Perfect Crime Party" gets 1st place and gets a total of 422 votes, amazing the editors because CROW "only" got 401 and +Natural 310 votes on their first chapter. The achievement is especially good since CROW didn't have a one shot like Road Racer to compete with at the time. Fukuda's Road Racer gets serialized too. Hearing +Natural dropped to the 8th place, Iwase gets fired up, as does Niizuma. At the end Mashiro, Takagi and Hattori visit Mashiro uncle's grave. Mashiro tells him he finally got 1st place and we see his uncle 'answering' that it should be a given and that when he truly becomes number one, he should come back again, but he smiles proudly.

=== Season 3 ===
No.	Title	Original airdate
1	"Tenacity and Determination"; Transliteration: "Iji to Ketsudan" (Japanese: 意地と決断)	October 6, 2012
The series continues off with Mashiro and Takagi's Perfect Crime Party's serialization. Azuki receives an offer for an audition role in the +Natural anime but she is undecided due to a promise with Mashiro to cast as the female lead for the anime adaptation of his manga. In the end she personally tells Aiko and Eiji she declines the role but before they can talk it out she's taken away by Mashiro who decided to stop her last minute. They hold hands the rest of way. Before she heads home, Azuki tells him that next time they meet, they'll kiss; by that time, their dreams will have come true.
2	"Every Night and Unite"; Transliteration: "Mai Ban to Yū Gō" (Japanese: 毎晩と融合)	October 13, 2012
Competition heats up between PCP and +Natural/Crow. Mashiro realize his art style is a tad too dark for their manga and gradually changes it each chapter which results in their rankings slowly getting better. Aiko becomes infatuated with Eiji after he acknowledges her talent while Eiji gets fired up again. +Natural gets the upper hand over PCP when the anime starts airing and things get worse when Eiji publishes a whole chapter without text, relying on the art alone, as response to Mashiro's development. Takahama's Ally of Justice and Fukuda's Road Racer Giri begin their new serializations too, heating up the competition even more. The episode ends with Mashiro and Takagi looking at the crossover between CROW and +Natural.
3	"Last and Cipher"; Transliteration: "Rasuto to Angō" (Japanese: ラストと暗号)	October 20, 2012
Mashiro and Takagi decide that PCP won't be able to beat CROW and +Natural at their current pace. Takagi decides that writing a five-week-long arc will increase PCP's ranking for week 25. They need to beat Eiji in order to be able to continue PCP so Mashiro and Hattori agree, though it's a risky tactic because the rating will go down until the finale chapter. Takagi thinks of the arc and it almost done but feels the story is lacking something. After seeing and talking to Aiko again, he realizes that PCP needs a rival character who is also able to push PCP forward as, just like their rivalry with Eiji, Fukuda and the rest does for them.
4	"Margin and Pitfall"; Transliteration: "Yoyū to Otoshiana" (Japanese: 余裕と落とし穴)	October 27, 2012
PCP gets selected for a drama CD to which Mashiro and Takagi nominate Azuki for the role of the main female character. As popularity of PCP continues to increase a light novel is also spawned. However Takagi and Mashiro still push for an anime adaptation causing Hattori to say that PCP will probably not be made into one. He goes on to explain that the editors at Yueisha had received numerous letters of complaint from adults saying that their children have been engaging in petty crimes and mischievous behaviour because of PCP's realistically influential content; this dashes the duos hopes. Nizuma also seems upset upon learning of this news. Shiratori draws his own storyboard with help from Takagi and shows it to Hattori who says that it may be good enough to be printed as a one-shot and even a serialization. Mashiro had conceived a plan for Ashirogi Muto to begin work on another manga. Therefore the news of Takagi and Shiratori collaborating took him by surprise because it would mean that Takagi would have to team up with Shiratori as well.
5	"Step and Watch"; Transliteration: "Suteppu to Uaotchi" (Japanese: ステップとウォッチ)	November 3, 2012
Takagi and Shiratori's manga Rabuta & Peace is entered into the serialization committee and it is published in the November issue of Shonen Jack placing 5th in the voting charts. Mashiro decides to use his free time to improve his drawing skill, aiming to reach a level where he can draw two manga simultaneously and be on par with Niizuma. Shiratori's mother disapproves of him drawing manga because of their family's high class reputation causing him to run away from home. His family then comes to the studio looking for him where Shiratori's mother insults everyone there by looking down on their manga artists' abilities. This leads to a heated exchange of words by both parties. Hiramaru and Aoki's serializations are both canceled due to low ratings and enter into an upcoming competition, Super Leaders Fest. Upon learning of this and Niizuma's participation (meaning that he will now be working on three manga) Mashiro decides to enter on his own with a new manga, since he doesn't want to affect Takagi's quality on PCP and Rabuta & Peace. However Takagi states that they will enter together.
6	"Punch and Independence"; Transliteration: "Panchi to Hitoritachi" (Japanese: パンチと1人立ち)	November 10, 2012
Mashiro convinces Takagi to let him work on their entry for the Super Leaders Fest so he can concentrate on Rabuta & Peace. After overcoming a bit of writer's block, Mashiro decides on entering with a love story. At Yueisha's Annual New Years Day party (2015) it is discovered that everyone intends on entering the Super Leaders Fest with love stories; Fukuda only did so because everyone else was. Mashiro asks Azuki for her input in his manga which would be based on their feelings for each other. Mashiro and Takagi end up having a fight over whether or not it is right for them to drift apart and work on separate manga. Shiratori decides to quit being an assistant and focus on getting Rabuta & Peace serialized while Takagi stops coming to the studio altogether, even going as far as to discuss PCP with Hattori separately. Later on Takagi comes back and explains that he had been away teaching Shiratori to become independent because Rabuta & Peace is his manga. Ashirogi Muto end up entering together and in the end they place 4th in the competition but reflect that it was worth it because they both had grown from their experiences.
7	"Commemorative Photo and Classroom"; Transliteration: "Kinen Satsuei to Kyōshitsu" (Japanese: 記念撮影と教室)	November 17, 2012
Yoshida wants Hiramaru to aim his manga, Never Reaching You, which placed 2nd in the Super Leaders Fest for a serialization. Hiramaru reluctantly agrees so long as he can go on a tea date with Aoki. Suspecting that Yoshida may be pulling the strings behind the scene, Hiramaru tells Aoki to turn off their phones so they can't be disturbed. When Yoshida realizes this, he goes after them but is sent on a wild goose chase through the city because Hiramaru sold his car to Fukuda, preventing him from being tracked. Takagi, Mashiro and Fukuda deduce that Hiramaru went to the tea shop he wrote about in his manga. They chase him and Aoki to a pedestrian bridge where Yoshida tries to convince him to keep drawing because he is a true genius that comes around every 2-3 years (much to Hirmaru's annoyance at the low number). Hiramaru goes to confess to Aoki, but Yoshida tries to talk him out of it because he will be crushed if he is turned down. However he goes ahead with support from Mashiro, Takagi, Miyoshi and Fukuda, to which Aoki accepts; however, Hiramaru now continues making manga with a new purpose, and that is to please Aoki. Ashirogi Muto are chosen to judge a competition called Treasure, and they are told that a newcomer, has entered with a manga called The Classroom of Truth that potentially surpasses all of their work.
8	"Aims and Assessment"; Transliteration: "Nerai to Hyōka" (Japanese: 狙いと評価)	November 24, 2012
Mashiro and Takagi begin reading The Classroom of Truth and decide that it is a very good manga despite the fact that it is unorthodox in nature. The serialization committee however, decide that the manga itself is not suited for Shonen Jack and have it remain a finalist in the competition. Its author, Nanamine Tooru, turns out to be a long time fan of Ashirogi Muto and is brought to Yueisha to discuss changing the material of The Classroom of Truth. However, Nanamine releases the manga on the internet which upsets Yueisha's policy but he brings them a new manga which the Chief reads and approves of as a one-shot immediately. Later, when Nanamine meets Takagi and Mashiro, he tells them he doesn't trust editors since he thinks manga artists themselves know better what a good manga is. He also reveals his working method: he collaborates with fellow manga artist on the internet and incorporates their ideas into his work, which he then passes off as his own. He states that he will do what is necessary to rise to the top of Shonen Jack. This new revelation leaves both Mashiro and Takagi angered.
9	"Confidence and Resolve"; Transliteration: "Jishin to Kakugo" (Japanese: 自信と覚悟)	December 1, 2012
As Nanamine's meeting with Mashiro and Takagi continues, he tells them that they are amateurs with no self confidence if they rely on editors that much. Nanamine continues to refine the storyboard for his one-shot with help from his internet community, should it get serialized and completely ignores his editor, Kosugi. A flashback shows Nanamine being a loner as a child, until he read Ashirogi Muto's Money & Intelligence, spawning his myopic philosophy that anything can be bought with money alone. As Nanamine's rating gets even higher, Mashiro and Takagi analyze his progress and begin to discuss their successor to PCP. The editorial department continue to marvel at Nanamine's work albeit minor skepticism from Hattori and Kosugi. Eventually Kosugi goes to Nanamine's house for a meeting where Nanamine reveals his method; paying artists to draw his manga after merging their ideas, to a shocked Kosugi and virtually blackmails him into keeping it quiet. Eventually the serialization committee makes their selections.
10	"Consideration and Provocation"; Transliteration: "Kōsatsu to Chōhatsu" (Japanese: 考察と挑発)	December 8, 2012
The serialization committee decides to serialize Aoki's What God Gave Me and Nanamine's What You Need for a Meaningful School Life. As Kosugi begins to be bothered by Nanamine's method, Hattori senses his discomfort and visits Mashiro and Takagi to gain some insight on Kosugi's attitude, which they reveal is due to Nanamine's unorthodox method, enraging Hattori. At the same time, Nanamine calls Akito to gloat about his serialization, but Ashirogi Muto states they will crush his methods using all the hard work they have put into PCP. Unperturbed, Nanamine says that they will let the rankings decide who is superior. Eventually, Hattori confronts Kosugi and is able to lift his spirits by reminding him of his value as an editor. As Nanamine collaborates with his internet acquaintances, some drop out after becoming fearful of his intention to challenge Ashirogi Muto. While Mashiro and Takagi decide how best to contest Nanamine, they realize, that they can best counterattack, by pitting the climax of PCP's current arc against Nanamine's second chapter. Eventually, as Kosugi reviews Nanamine's work and points out the weakness in his background drawings, Nanamine reveals his secret weapon: a returning Takuro Nakai.
11	"Impatience and Return"; Transliteration: "Shōryo to Kaeten" (Japanese: 焦慮と逆転)	December 15, 2012
As Nanamine's battle with Ashirogi Muto continues, he hires Nakai and is able to increase the level of his art albeit Nakai inadvertently discovers his method. As the weeks progress, Aoki's What God Gave Me rises to the top of the rankings followed by a sharp decline, while Ashirogi Muto's PCP remain steady at 4th place. Nanamine's What You Need for a Meaningful School Life initially comes in 2nd place but soon plummets to 15th and is on the verge of cancellation since he keeps adding too many ideas from his internet community. Nanamine then tries to bait Ashirogi Muto into competing with the same type of story, which they reject outright due to Yueisha's policy. While he continues to argue with his internet community and rejecting Kosugi's input, a large part of Nanamine's community abandons him for rejecting their ideas and exposes his method to deputy chief editor Aida. Kosugi decides to take full responsibility and visits Nanamine, who asks him to steal Ashirogi Muto's next storyboard out of desperation. Afterwards, Kosugi visits Mashiro and Takagi and explains the situation to them. He asks that they compete with the same story as Nanamine (with permission from the Chief and Hattori) and teach him what it really means to be a manga artist, which they accept.
12	"Zeal and Annihilation"; Transliteration: "Nekketsu to Kanpai" (Japanese: 熱血と完敗)	December 22, 2012
Kosugi explains the competition to Nanamine and tells him that if he loses, he has to form a proper author-editor relationship with him. Meanwhile, Takagi explains the obvious flaw in Nanamine's method: controlling such a large group of people and choosing/blending the best ideas from them is simply impossible. Nakai also realizes this and tells the internet community that Nanamine had been hiding the true ratings from them to prevent their departure, which they do upon learning of this. With his ranking dropped to 19th and PCP in 3rd place, Nanamine decides to give up but Kosugi doesn't let him walk away and demonstrates he wouldn't leave him, prompting Nanamine to start anew by doing the work himself. Eventually, at Yueisha's Annual New Years Day party (2016), Nanamine deems Ashirogi Muto his rival and vows to beat them eventually. Soon an elementary school reunion takes place which Mashiro attends (Takagi didn't as Kaya was ill and he was worried) and is hailed as a celebrity by his former classmates. He clears up any incorrect ideas they have about manga artist life, surprising them. Afterwards, he explains to Takagi how their profession made them miss out on enjoying life with their friends but are both content that they are pursuing their dream. Finally, news of a bank robbery airs; not a single thing was stolen though. A volume of PCP was left, showing the thieves mimicked the manga.
13	"Imitation and Unconsciousness"; Transliteration: "Muhou to Muishiki" (Japanese: 模倣と無意識)	December 29, 2012
As Mashiro and Azuki ponder the effects that the robbery would have on PCP and Takagi, the Chief and Hattori decide to support Ashirogi Muto as much as possible. However, Takagi's mental state has already been greatly affected. This causes him to write lower quality stories and eventually he reuses old ideas he once rejected. This results in PCP's ranking dropping from the top five to the 12th place. As PCP enters a slump, Yujiro confides in Hattori of Nizuma's deal to cancel one manga should he get the top spot in the rankings, which may happen soon. This leads Hattori to become fearful of PCP's serialization. As another bank robbery occurs, the thieves leave a card, claiming they are PCP, which enrages Takagi but he finally finds a way to resolve this.PCP's next chapter is about a copycat crime intended to make it seem like the PCP protagonists had done it, but is foiled by their rival who realized the real PCP wouldn't commit criminal acts, much less claim it was their doing. As the results of the rankings come in, PCP jumps back to 3rd place with Mashiro and Takagi expressing that their manga does not condone crime.
14	"Continuity and Obstruction"; Transliteration: "Renzoku to Soshi" (Japanese: 連続と阻止)	January 5, 2013
Nizuma begins devoting himself to CROW, which soon manages to place 1st in the rankings for five consecutive weeks. Yujiro is initially thrilled but later worries Nizuma's determination is connected with the deal he made with the Chief. He speculates Nizuma might want to end +Natural. As Ashirogi Muto follow CROW's progress, they take it as Nizuma's method of motivating them to improve PCP. Soon enough, Nizuma pays the Chief a surprise visit at the Yueisha and Yujirou can only speculate what they discuss. Yujiro informs Fukuda of Nizuma's intentions, who then gathers together Takagi, Mashiro, Aoki, Hiramaru, Takahama and Akina to confront Nizuma directly. Nizuma explains the deal he made with the Chief: he'll get to end a manga should he gain 1st place in the rankings for 10 consecutive weeks. He then reveals that he intends to end CROW at the height of its popularity since he doesn't believe in Yueisha's policy of continuing a manga solely for profit. However, since everyone always looked up to Nizuma, they refuse to let him have his way and resolve to surpass CROW before he can end it. Nizuma accepts their challenge and proposes a modified ultimatum: if they can beat CROW in the rankings at least once before he finishes his final manuscript, he will not end the manga.
15	"Cover and Center"; Transliteration: "Kantou to SENTAA" (Japanese: フロントとセンター)	January 12, 2013
With Nizuma's ultimatum clearly set, only seven weeks remain until the end of CROW. Yujiro decides to inform the entire editing department of Nizuma's intentions, much to their frustration but eventually decide to do all they can for their authors to surpass CROW. As the weeks close in, everyone does their best to improve their manga, with Fukuda introducing a new character in Road Racer Giri and Takahama beginning a new story arc for Mikata's Justice while utilizing their cover spreads. As Ashirogi Muto decide how to compete against Nizuma, they decide to utilize the strength that PCP possesses: its unconventionaliy and introduce a mysterious new anti heroic character called "Sigma". As the results come in, CROW remains 1st while Road Racer Giri and Mikata's Justice place 2nd in consecutive weeks followed by PCP, with the editing department's favorite for beating CROW being Mikata's Justice. However, with everyone's manga greatly improving, the voting gap closes between everyone else and Nizuma. Hattori is able to secure a colored centered page for Ashirogi Muto in the 36th issue of Shonen Jack. After brainstorming, they come up with an idea to plant a hidden message within the colored page, which would only become apparent once the readers finish their chapter and with this, Ashirogi Muto challenge CROW.
16	"Final Chapter & Comment"; Transliteration: "Saishuu wa to KOMENTO" (Japanese: 最終話とコメント)	January 19, 2013
Yujiro acknowledges Nizuma's determination and states that he will support him in ending CROW. As Ashirogi's next chapter of PCP is published, everyone marvels at their brilliance in using the colored page the way they did. The page itself is an invitation for the protagonists of PCP to meet the mysterious "Sigma". The page shows the portrait of PCP's leader, Makoto, which is altered by "Sigma" to detail the date, time and place of their meeting. The idea is that the readers are able to engage themselves in the puzzle by using the colored page. As the results come in, Ashirogi Muto ties in second place with Road Racer Giri while CROW takes first place yet again. As Takagi and Mashiro think about their defeat, they realize it was their rivalry with Nizuma that brought them as far as they have come, and express this in the comments section for CROW's final chapter. As Yujiro congratulates Nizuma on ending CROW, he is shocked to discover Nizuma already has many other manga drawn. Eventually Nizuma visits Takagi and Mashiro and they both express their admiration for being each other's rivals as well as Nizuma's joy of making friends based on their shared passion for manga. Finally, Nizuma tells Takagi and Mashiro that his next work will be the greatest manga ever written.
17	"Zombies & Demons"; Transliteration: "ZONBI to Akuma" (Japanese: ゾンビと悪魔)	January 26, 2013
As +Natural's ratings plummet to 15th place in the rankings, and being informed by Miura that her story is not on par with the battle archetype, Iwase loses confidence in her abilities and decides to stop writing altogether. Upon learning of this from Aoki through Takagi, Mashiro pays her a visit and reminds her that she is Takagi's driving force and should stay as a fellow rival, although she is free to do what she pleases. Eventually everyone from Team Fukuda shows up and witnessing how much they care, Iwase is able to restore her resolve. Later, Sasaki is transferred to another magazine, but before he leaves, pays Nizuma and Ashirogi Muto a visit. He expresses his desire to see them both do well and acknowledges the fact that he had favoritism towards Mashiro and Takagi due to a promise he kept to Mashiro's late uncle, Nobuhiro. Nizuma shows Yujiro his storyboard for his next manga with a zombie theme, with Yujiro remarking that it is already better than CROW. Mashiro and Takagi also finalize plans for PCP's successor and decide on the standard battle archetype. Their new manga would involve two demonic protagonists with differing ideals battling it out for the sake of Justice. As the archetype fits perfectly as a Shonen Manga, and using all the experience they have gained so far, Ashirogi Muto decide to challenge Nizuma's next Zombie Manga with their Demonic Manga.
18	"Weekly & Monthly"; Transliteration: "Shuukan to Gekkan" (Japanese: 週刊と月刊)	February 2, 2013
The editing department go ecstatic over Ashirogi's Reversi and Nizuma's Zombie Gun so both are published as one-shots. Meanwhile, Azuki lands the lead role in popular soccer anime Instant 12 and Mashiro congratulates her, promising the breakout role from their future anime. As the votes come in, Zombie Gun sets a new record by getting the highest number of votes for a one-shot: 692. However in the second week, as Reversi is published, it places 1st and beats Nizuma's Zombie Gun by a margin of two votes. At the serialization committee, it is decided that both Zombie Gun and Reversi should be published, however they have a difficult time deciding how to deal with Ashirogi producing two manga weekly. Heishi seeks advice from Sasaki and they decide it would be best if Ashirogi does PCP weekly and Reversi as a monthly manga. This news upsets Hattori since he confides in Yujiro that he wanted to edit Reversi. At another serialization meeting, Yujiro takes Hattori's desire into account and calls him, Takagi and Mashiro in to have them voice their opinion. They unanimously agree that PCP should go monthly because of its broader audience and publish Reversi weekly so it can compete with Nizuma's manga for dominance. Eventually, Mashiro decides to buy the studio from his grandfather, who gives him Nobuhiro's diary. As Mashiro reads it, he becomes more determined than ever to continue his uncle's legacy.
19	"Slow & All at Once"; Transliteration: "Manobi to Ikki" (Japanese: 間延びと一気)	February 9, 2013
As Ashirogi Muto struggle to meet deadlines for the Shonen Jack and Hisshou Jump magazines, a backlog of work starts piling up. As Mashiro and his three assistants, along with help from Takagi and Miyoshi push themselves to their limits to complete the storyboards, returning professional assistant, Ogawa, steps in with two new assistants and is able to complete the storyboards. As the competition between Nizuma's Zombie Gun and Ashirogi Muto's Reversi takes off, Reversi manages to take 1st place in the rankings for three consecutive weeks. Nizuma makes a drastic move by changing one of his antagonists for Zombie Gun and rises to the top once again. This shows the weakness in Reversi; it has two protagonists, and one can't be killed off and replaced. As Takagi realizes this, he slows the pace of his story to match the standard battle archetype which further results in their ratings dropping to 5th place. Eventually, after a discussion with Hattori, Takagi calls Mashiro and they both agree that Reversi may not be a long running manga, even managing 50 chapters. However they discuss being content with resolving the conflict between the protagonists in the most interesting way possible, rather than prolonging it. Nevertheless, for the sake of himself, Mashiro and Azuki, Takagi promises to go all out and turn Reversi into a masterpiece they can all be proud of.
20	"Breather & Party"; Transliteration: "Ikitsugi to PAATII" (Japanese: 息継ぎとパーティー)	February 16, 2013
Mashiro and Takagi discuss their intention of covering the final confrontation of the main characters of Reversi in one go with a shocked Hattori, but they decide to cross that bridge when they get there. Meanwhile, Hiramaru's Never Reaching You is selected for an anime while Aoki's What God Gave Me is cancelled. In order to cheer her up Hiramaru invites Aoki to an amusement park with the intention of proposing to her. On learning of this, Yoshida is initially intent on stopping Hiramaru, since he will be distraught if he is turned down, but upon remembering his very first meeting with Hiramaru, decides to help him. At the amusement park, Hiarmaru takes Aoki to the ferris wheel, but isn't able to propose since he loses the engagement ring. Aoki realizes what Hiramaru is doing and gives him another chance, where he proposes in an unorthodox manner and she accepts, much to Hiramaru and Yoshida's joy; however, as a downside, the negative Hirmaru draws from for his manga is greatly lessened. Later, Reversi continues to dominate over Zombie Gun in the rankings however demand for the printed volumes of Zombie Gun skyrockets. As Ashirogi Muto and Hattori analyze what this means they realize that the content of Reversi isn't easily comprehensible to children or the female demographic alike. Towards the end of the year, Mashiro, Takagi, Miyoshi and their assistants attend the annual, Tezuka-Akatsuka (2017) Prize Party. Here, Kato's friend, a voice actress called Ririka Kitami tries to hit on Mashiro, but gives up when she learns Azuki is his girlfriend; she calls them "the couple of the century". Eventually Ashirogi meet Nizuma who commends them on dominating over Zombie Gun in the rankings but promises that sales of the manga volumes won't lose to them, words that they take as motivation. Finally Mashiro and Takagi are approached by Futoshi Tanabe, a producer for the Japanese Animation Company.
21	"Hot Springs & Confirmation of Intention"; Transliteration: "Onsen to Ishi Kakunin" (Japanese: 温泉と意思確認)	February 23, 2013
Mashiro, Takagi and Miyoshi go to a hot spring for the short new year holiday. Mashiro and Takagi contemplate how far they have come since middle school. As the year begins, the editors at Shonen Jack have a tough time deciding which series, Zombie Gun or Reversi should get an anime since both have compelling circumstances. Yujiro explains this to Nizuma who turns down the offer, but changes his mind when he learns that Reversi will take its place. Aida asks for Hattori's approval in selecting Reversi but he is torn. He knows Ashirogi might end the manga before the anime even starts and feels obliged to tell this, but then the offer might be pulled. Hattori discusses this with Mashiro and Takagi who both immediately agree on the anime, but they realize they may have to prolong Reversi for a year and thus sacrifice its quality. Takagi promises that he will not let Reversi's quality waver and Mashiro finally tells Hattori why Takagi would go so far for him: because of the promise he made to Azuki. Hattori realizes that he was wrong to worry too much about it and wants to support them. Afterwards Yujiro and Hattori try to make convince Heishi their manga should get an anime and become the flagship series. Later, Hattori hurriedly bursts into Mashiro's studio with news of the outcome.
22	"Correction And Declaration"; Transliteration: "Teisei to Sengen" (Japanese: 訂正と宣言)	March 2, 2013
Hattori announces that the Reversi anime will begin airing in October and Mashiro breaks into tears as their dream is at last within reach. Heishi calls Nizuma and explains why he rejected Zombie Gun, since it will help Ashirogi to rise to his level and secure the future of Shonen Jack; this only inspire Nizuma to continue growing as manga artist as well. Azuki calls Mashiro to congratulate him and recites lines from Reversi. Later Ririka Kitami blogs about her meeting with Mashiro and his involvement with Azuki; Takagi has Kato ensure that Ririka erases the entry. However, Ishizawa, jealous of his classmates successful lives, posts proof on the internet to make Mashiro and Asuki miserable. As rumors begin spreading, everyone worries the public will accuse Ashirogi of favoritism to Azuki, something that could damage her career. This is confirmed when Mashiro, Takagi and Hattori meet the animation committee for Reversi. Mashiro tells Azuki that she should deny any relationship with him on her weekly radio broadcast to preserve her image. However, instead she goes public with her relationship, telling everyone about their promise. This has a mixed effect on the public, some who call the station and ask her personal questions. In the end, Mashiro calls the show and tells the public to believe in Azuki as they always have and adamantly states that she will get the part of the lead female role in Reversi by her skills alone.
23	"Mic & Script"; Transliteration: "MAIKU to Daihon" (Japanese: マイクと台本)	March 9, 2013
After the radio broadcast, Azuki's fans seem to have calmed down and Reversi gets a lot positive attention. The anime producers want to hold a public audition for the female lead role and let the public vote who should get the role, which would be unfavorable for Azuki since she won't be judged objectively. Despite this, Mashiro agrees, not wanting to let people think she got the role through connections. During the auditions Azuki's performance is excellent but people notice that she mentioned "Schwarz" instead of "Weiss" during her performance, like all the voice actresses did before her. Worried how the different line in the script will affect her, everyone is worried. Later, during the show, the director of the program makes a short announcement in which he states the script was based on the published Shonen Jack magazine edition, where the mistake was printed in, but that this was corrected in the manga volume. Since Azuki used the manga volume to learn the lines, she didn't make the "mistake" the other voice actresses did without knowing. He tells the public that no one is "wrong" and that this fact should be considered in the votes. In the end Azuki wins by a huge margin and Mashiro, Takagi and Miyoshi celebrate Mashiro and Azuki's dreams finally getting fulfilled.
24	"The Way It Is & The Way It Will End"; Transliteration: "Ari Kata to Owari Kata" (Japanese: あり方と終わり方)	March 16, 2013
Following Azuki securing the role of the lead female character, Hattori, Mashiro and Takagi begin discussing their intention to end the Reversi manga in July. Later, Mashiro calls Azuki to congratulate her and they make plans to meet once the first episode of Reversi finishes airing. Hattori tells Heishi about Ashirogi's plan, which he rejects and orders Hattori to convince them to continue the manga. Hattori explains this to Mashiro and Takagi and they decide to think about their final decision. However, Takagi has a separate meeting with Hattori. He states that he will end Reversi in 8 chapters and surpass Nizuma in both rankings as well as volume sales, making Mashiro the best manga artist in Shonen Jack, wanting this to be his wedding present. Hattori decides to take responsibility reflect the words of Director Torishima: 'when the company and authors are at odds, a good editor should stand by the author'. Heishi, having heard the same words before, sides with Ashirogi and informs the animation studio of their decision, which they accept; having the completed series will allow them to stay true to it. When the final chapter is published everyone is awestruck at the spectacular climactic battle between the two protagonists. It is such a smashing success that the manga volumes sell out within a day, surpassing the sales of Zombie Gun by selling 1.22 million copies per volume. Finally, at Reversi's end, Heishi, summons Ashirogi to Yueisha where they meet Nizuma and their motivational rivalry continues.
25	"Dreams & Reality"; Transliteration: "Yume to Genjitsu" (Japanese: 夢と現実)	March 30, 2013
Hattori meets with the production staff and cast of Reversi's anime as production gets underway. At the studio, Mashiro reveals to Miyoshi of his intention to propose to Azuki after Reversi's premiere and thanks her for creating their pen name: "Ashirogi Muto". As Miyoshi leaves, Mashiro and Takagi reflect on their journey thus far. Elsewhere, Azuki reveals her and Mashiro's plans to meet after the anime to her mother, while Mashiro reads his uncle's diary. Later, after the anime premieres, Mashiro picks up Azuki in a fashion, honoring one of his late uncle's dreams and they talk about the times they had been together. Soon, Mashiro takes Azuki to visit her former home where they recreate the scene of the first time Mashiro approached her at her house, before proposing. Azuki answers by kissing him and promises that they will be together forever. Eventually everyone attends Hiramaru and Aoki's wedding where Azuki catches the bride's bouquet of flowers. Finally, Azuki and Mashiro move into Azuki's old house together with the intention to officially have a wedding ceremony if Ashirogi's newest work gets a serialization. With their dreams finally achieved, Mashiro ends the series with a monologue, stating dreams are not achieved by someone telling you so, you have to make them reality yourself.
