= Motion Music of Bakuman =

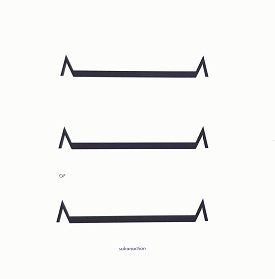

Soundtrack album by Sakanaction
- Released: September 30, 2015
- Recorded: 2015
- Genres: Dance rock, pop, electronic, techno
- Length: 34:54
- Label: NF Records
- Producer: Sakanaction

Motion Music of Bakuman is a soundtrack by Japanese band Sakanaction, for the 2015 live-action film adaptation of the manga series Bakuman. The soundtrack was released as a bonus CD included with the limited-edition version of the band's "Shin Takarajima" (2015) single, a song which served as the theme song of the film. The soundtrack was awarded the Outstanding Achievement in Music award at the 39th Japan Academy Prize awards.

== Background and production ==
In 2011, the band found a new resolution to write music for a general pop audience, as a way to both challenge themselves, and to make music that would resonate with a greater number of people. Sakanaction began to write music for use in commercial campaigns and television programs. Their first release for a television program was writing the Tsuyoshi Kusanagi-starring drama 37-sai de Isha ni Natta Boku: Kenshui Junjō Monogatari, "Boku to Hana", which the band released as a single in 2012. In 2014, the band had their first experience of creating theme songs for Japanese films. The producers of the Satoshi Tsumabuki-starring film Judge! asked the band to use their 2010 single "Identity" as the theme song for the film, and later asked the band to write a new composition for the ending credits, "Eureka". Later in 2014, Sakanaction released "Hasu no Hana", a song they wrote as the theme song for the film Close Range Love, starring Tomohisa Yamashita and Nana Komatsu.

Motion Music of Bakuman was the first time Sakanaction had produced an entire soundtrack for a film. Bakuman director Hitoshi Ohne asked the band to create the soundtrack in 2013, after being impressed by the band's performance at the 2012 Taicoclub outdoor music festival. Ohne liked the fact that all of the members of Sakanaction were able to produce music, something which he believed added a great variety to the soundtrack.

After reading the script, Sakanaction created demos for approximately 10 songs to be used in the soundtrack, which they recorded at Aobadai Studio in Meguro, Tokyo. Ohne set these demos to the already filmed scenes, then discussed in great detail with the band's vocalist and songwriter Ichiro Yamaguchi exactly how he would prefer the music for these scenes to be, eventually creating a soundtrack that reflected his personal vision.

The demo version of the CGI battle scene music ("Down with Eiji!") used traditional Japanese instruments such as taiko drums, the koto and the Ainu idiophone mukkuri, however Ohne vetoed the use of the mukkuri in the final cut of the song. In one composition ("It's Our Gambling Game!"), the band used the sound effects of the film's protagonists drawing.

== Release and promotion ==
The soundtrack was compiled as a part of the Bakuman Box edition of the "Shin Takarajima" single: a three disc set featuring two audio CDs and a DVD. On the CD, the soundtrack is recorded as a single track, totalling over 30 minutes of music. The single track is composed of 19 different sequences, where each sequence is separated by the sound effect of turning pages. The album's booklet features the titles of each of the soundtrack sequences hidden in a typographical picture.

== Critical reception ==
Yū Aoki of What's In? saw Yamaguchi's work as a soundtrack director as successfully breaking new ground musically. He felt that the soundtrack had a strong sense of the genre-crossing avant garde aspects of Sakanaction's music. The soundtrack won the award for Outstanding Achievement in Music at the 39th Japan Academy Prize awards, while the film Bakuman also received the Japan Academy Prize for Best Film Editing and Popularity awards.

== Track listing ==
Note: individual sequence lengths are approximate, due to the soundtrack being released as a single track.

All tracks are written by Sakanaction.

No.	Title	Length
1.	"Opening"	1:57
2.	"The Room of Saiko's Uncle: The Road to Manga Artist, Hard to Climb"	2:29
3.	"Make a Start and Finish: W-Earth"	1:45
4.	""Here Is My Opinion...", Mr. Hattori Speaks in a Professional-like Way"	0:24
5.	"They Run Out with Delight"	0:56
6.	"We Will Definitely Win the Tezuka Award!"	1:15
7.	"Who Is Eiji?"	1:45
8.	"About the Structure of the Editorial Department, and How to Get the Serialized"	3:04
9.	"Towards Our Dream"	1:35
10.	"It's Our Gambling Game!"	1:27
11.	""Konoyo wa Kane to Chie" Is Near Completion!"	2:22
12.	"Down with Eiji!"	2:41
13.	"A New Heroine's Appearance."	1:09
14.	"Theme of Azuki"	1:04
15.	"Current Issue Release. We Have a Lot of Dreams!"	2:16
16.	"Saiko's Uncle"	0:55
17.	"Part with Azuki. "Well... I'll Go Ahead.""	4:19
18.	"Friendship Efforts"	1:49
19.	"Now, to the Editorial Department!"	1:40
Total length:		34:54

== Personnel ==
Personnel details were sourced from Motion Music of Bakuman's liner notes booklet.

- Kensuke Maeda – assisting
- Sakanaction – arrangement, production
- Yoshinori Sunahara – mastering
- Ayaka Toki – mixing, recording

== Release history ==
Region	Date	Format	Distributing Label	Catalog codes
Japan	September 30, 2015	CD	NF Records	VICY-910
