= Kenta Kiritani =

Japanese actor and singer (born 1980)

- 桐谷 健太
- Born: February 4, 1980 (age 46); Kita-ku, Osaka, Japan
- Education: Osaka Prefectural Sakurazuka High School
- Occupations: Actor, singer
- Years active: 1999–present
- Agent: Hot Road
- Children: 2
- Website: Official website

Kenta Kiritani (桐谷 健太, Kiritani Kenta; born February 4, 1980) is a Japanese actor and singer.

== Filmography ==
=== Film ===
Year	Title	Role	Notes	Ref.
2015	Bakuman	Shinta Fukuda		
2015	A Sower of Seeds 2	Takeshi Toyoshima		
2016	Too Young to Die!	Cozy		
2017	Hibana: Spark	Kamiya		
2022	Miracle City Koza	Shōta / Haru	Lead role	
2022	Fragments of the Last Will	Mitsuo Aizawa		
2023	Kubi	Hattori Hanzō		
2023	Analog	Jun'ichi Takagi		
2025	My Beloved Stranger	Keisuke		

=== Television ===
Year	Title	Role	Notes	Ref.
2010	Ryōmaden	Ikeuchi Kurata	Taiga drama	
2015	Mozu	Akifumi Mishima		
2018	Manpuku	Katsuo Sera	Asadora	
2019	Idaten	Ichirō Kōno	Taiga drama	
2022	Invisible	Shinichiro Saruwatari		
2025	Unbound	Ōta Nanpo	Taiga drama	

=== Dubbing ===
- The Legend of Tarzan, Tarzan (Alexander Skarsgård)

== Awards and nominations ==
Year	Award	Category	Work(s)	Result	Ref.
2011	35th Elan d'or Awards	Newcomer of the Year	Himself	Won	
