= List of Bakuman characters =

Several characters from Bakuman with their manga series behind them. Clockwise from top-left; Akito Takagi and Moritaka Mashiro with Detective Trap, Shinta Fukuda with Kiyoshi Knight, Takuro Nakai and Ko Aoki with Hideout Door

The Bakuman manga series features a cast of characters created by Tsugumi Ohba and Takeshi Obata. The writer of the series, Ohba, developed the basic character traits while Obata, the artist, created the visual character designs. The story follows talented artist Moritaka Mashiro and aspiring writer Akito Takagi, two ninth grade boys who team up to become manga artists, with Mashiro as the illustrator and Takagi as the writer. The majority of the other characters are also involved in the manga industry as artists, editors, or assistants.

== Main characters ==
=== Moritaka Mashiro ===
Voiced by: Jun Fukuyama (Vomic), Atsushi Abe (anime) (Japanese); Michael Sinterniklaas (English)
Portrayed by: Takeru Satoh (film), Hiroki Suzuki (play)

Moritaka Mashiro (真城 最高, Mashiro Moritaka) was once content in following the usual life of a Japanese citizen by attending a university and becoming an office worker, however he is inspired to become a manga artist like his late uncle Nobuhiro. He has a crush on his classmate Miho Azuki that he ends up making a promise to marry her after both of them achieve their dreams. He teams up with Akito Takagi to create a manga that is worthy to be adapted into an anime.^{Volume 1} The two work under the shared pen name "Muto Ashirogi" (亜城木 夢叶, Ashirogi Muto) where he serves as the illustrator. His nickname is Saiko (サイコー, Saikō), which is an alternate reading of the kanji in his name. His favorite manga is Ashita no Joe.^{Vol. 1 ch 3}

=== Akito Takagi ===
Voiced by: Shinnosuke Tachibana (Vomic), Satoshi Hino (anime) (Japanese); Kevin T. Collins (English)
Portrayed by: Ryunosuke Kamiki (film), Yoshihiko Aramaki (play)

Akito Takagi (高木 秋人, Takagi Akito) partners with Mashiro on making manga together. He specializes in story lines, some of which are unorthodox, as well as a style known as "serious comedy", where a scene with underlying seriousness comes off with humor, writing them into their manga. The two start working under the pen name Muto Ashirogi (亜城木 夢叶, Ashirogi Muto); Takagi is sometimes called Shujin (シュージン, Shūjin; lit. 'prisoner'), which is an alternate spelling of his name. Prior to teaming up with Mashiro, he is a star student who attracts Aiko Iwase although the latter thought of him more as an academic rival. However, he becomes frustrated that his parents were pushing him towards becoming an office worker that he decided to do manga instead. After revealing his career aspirations, he chooses Kaya Miyoshi as his girlfriend over Iwase.^{Vol. 2} His favorite manga is Dragon Ball.^{Ch. 3}

=== Miho Azuki ===
Voiced by: Minako Kotobuki (Vomic), Saori Hayami (anime) (Japanese); Stephanie Sheh (English)
Portrayed by: Nana Komatsu (film)

Miho Azuki (亜豆 美保, Azuki Miho) is Mashiro's love interest in the series. She aspires to become a voice actress. Her mother is the woman Mashiro's uncle Nobuhiro fell in love with. Azuki promises to marry Mashiro after they achieve their dreams; however, they agree not to see each other until then.^{Vol. 1} She picks up voice work, although her popularity comes mostly because of her looks, and not because of her poor singing.^{Vol. 3} When her agent urges her to participate in a gravure idol photo book,^{Ch. 34} she struggles with the idea of showing her body to the public, but with Mashiro's support, she declines the offer.^{Vol. 5} She and Mashiro communicate mainly through text messages and sometimes through phone calls, but rarely meet except by chance or under special circumstances. During Mashiro's hospitalization, Miho reveals that she has liked him since the fourth grade.^{Ch. 46} After Mashiro is released, they have been talking with each other much more than before.

=== Kaya Miyoshi ===
Voiced by: Sayuri Yahagi (Japanese); Amanda Shuckman (English)

Kaya Miyoshi (見吉 香耶, Miyoshi Kaya) is Azuki's best friend and Takagi's girlfriend.^{Ch. 11} She has rather poor self-esteem when it comes to her looks, believing others are lying when they complement her looks. Kaya used to practice martial arts in junior high, making her stronger than most girls; she also has a temper,^{Ch. 11} which only gets worse when she gets drunk. Because her friends have high aspirations, she begins to feel left out, and decides to become a cell phone novelist.^{Ch. 21} For her first story, she wants to depict the romance between Mashiro and Azuki; however, Takagi ends up writing it for her.^{Ch. 25} She then changes her dream to support Mashiro and Takagi, with hopes of marrying Takagi; she starts by helping them read and watch through a pile of mystery-themed books and anime.^{Ch. 28} She helps out in inking the manga and generally maintaining a positive atmosphere in the studio. Mashiro and Takagi find that her optimistic presence in the studio helps cheer up what is otherwise a very stressful working environment, and feel she is part of "the team".^{Vol. 5} She is the one who came up with the "Muto Ashirogi" pen name. (Note: The pen name Muto Ashirogi (亜城木 夢叶, Ashirogi Muto) is a combination of two phrases. "Ashirogi" is a portmanteau of Azuki, Mashiro, and Takagi, and "Muto" is a short for "yume o kanaeru" which means "dream coming true".)^{Ch. 15} Her favorite manga is One Piece.

== Supporting characters ==
=== Other manga creators ===
==== Eiji Nizuma ====
Voiced by: Nobuhiko Okamoto (Japanese); Robby Sharpe (English)
Portrayed by: Shota Sometani (film), Shohei Hashimoto (play)

Eiji Nizuma (新妻 エイジ, Niizuma Eiji) is a manga creator prodigy who won the Tezuka Award at age 15. He moves from Aomori to Tokyo to work on the serialization of his manga Crow on the condition that he gets the right to cancel any series in Weekly Shōnen Jump after becoming the magazine's most popular author.^{Ch. 9} He later is drafted to illustrate Aiko Iwase's scripts in the form of +Natural, which he is able to effortlessly balance with Crow. After Crow enters its seventh year of serialization as one of Jump's flagship titles, Nizuma reveals that the series that he wants to cancel is his own, not wanting to drag it any longer than he feels necessary at the behest of readers or editors, which he achieves after holding a record-breaking 20-week poll leadership, leading into the final chapter. From there, Nizuma decides to write a manga that would be "the number one in the world", and starts working on Zombie٭Gun with that intent. He enjoys being immersed in his work and blasting loud music in the background.^{Ch. 13} He never seems to change his clothes, which consist of a sweater and sweatpants; he may not change clothes much, or has several similar outfits. Mashiro and Takagi declare him their rival, although he is very friendly upon meeting them and states he is a fan of theirs^{Ch. 18}; indeed, this admiration also fuels their mutual rivalry and determination to write ever more enjoyable works. The head editor describes the difference between Mashiro and Takagi to Nizuma is their "love of manga"; indeed, Nizuma seems to have been obsessed with drawing manga since he was six years old. Nizuma tends to act conceited because he is hailed as a genius; however, after working on Crow for quite a long time, he becomes humbler, even claiming to "not be good enough of a manga artist to be judging other people's work" when asked by his editor to judge for the Treasure magazine. Nizuma is eccentric and has a variety of odd quirks, like constantly pronouncing sound effects while he draws and speaks, working to the sound of very loud music, and appearing most of the time with drawing quills tucked into the back of his shirt's collar, resembling small wings. Despite this, he has a keen eye for truly talented manga artists just by analyzing their work, and is a good judge of character. He works under the direction of the Weekly Shōnen Jump editor Yujiro Hattori and for a time with his two assistants, Shinta Fukuda and Takurō Nakai. His favorite manga is Doraemon.

==== Shinta Fukuda ====
Voiced by: Junichi Suwabe
Portrayed by: Kenta Kiritani (film), Oreno Graffiti (play)

Shinta Fukuda (福田 真太, Fukuda Shinta) first appears as an assistant for Eiji Nizuma.^{Ch. 22} Hailing from Hiroshima, he received an honorable mention when he tried for the Tezuka Award with U-400 and also gets fifth place in the same issue of Akamaru Jump with Ashirogi's Money and Intelligence one-shot.^{Ch. 11} He becomes friends with Mashiro and also competes with Ashirogi in the Gold Future Cup with his original manga Kiyoshi Knight.^{Ch. 28-29} Fukuda then gets serialized and is an aspiring rival to Ashirogi, Nizuma, and Nakai, going on to achieve considerable popularity with his following series, the motorcycle racing-themed Road Racer Giri. Among them, he is considered to have the worst drawings, though that they often border on grotesque apparently matches his stories.^{Vol. 4} He can be extremely conceited, abrasive and competitive at times, yet helps out his rivals, who are also his friends. When he heard of the rumors on the internet about Mashiro and Azuki, he went on the radio and scolded the listeners who badmouthed them. His favorite manga include romantic comedies To Love-Ru, Strawberry 100%, and I"s.^{Ch. 24}

==== Takuro Nakai ====
Voiced by: Tomoyuki Shimura
Portrayed by: Sarutoki Minagawa (film), Hiroki Murakami (play)

Takuro Nakai (中井 巧朗, Nakai Takurō) is a former assistant of Eiji Nizuma's. As a manga artist, he won a monthly award ten years before his introduction in the story, and has since been determined to get serialized and find a girlfriend.^{Vol. 3} He is good with drawing backgrounds and angles. He originally started as an assistant for Eiji Nizuma and then turned into an assistant for Kō Aoki,^{Ch. 29} whom he was attracted to, for Hideout Door. Once the serialization ended, he confessed his love for Kō but was rejected. He eventually showed up again as an assistant for Takahama, who as an assistant for Muto Ashirogi who got serialized. Eventually, when Kō asked him to draw for her, he told her he would, on the condition that she became his girlfriend. Kō slapped him and told him to never speak to her again. After Takahama's series was canceled, and being rejected by another girl who was assisting with him, he gave up and returned to his home in Akita, despite protests from Kō, Shinta Fukuda (who was another assistant with him for Eiji) and both Mashiro and Takagi. However he eventually comes and becomes Nanamine Toru's assistant for his work "What is required for a good school life" He is later employed as Hiramaru's assistant, being manipulated by Mr. Yoshida. His favorite manga is Kimagure Orange Road.

==== Ko Aoki ====
Voiced by: Ayako Kawasumi

Ko Aoki (蒼樹 紅, Aoki Kō) is an aspiring female manga artist who joins Jump to work on a fantasy shōnen manga. Prior to her new genre, she worked for Margaret magazine in shōjo manga. She placed second in the Story King competition the year before. She is paired with Nakai for her first series, Hideout Door.^{Ch. 29} Her real name is Yuriko Aoki (青木 優梨子, Aoki Yuriko) and she is a graduate student studying literature at the same university as Aiko Iwase. Her editor believes that her good looks will help her sales, however, she is distrustful of men, and regularly rejects Nakai's advances. However, she gradually opens up, and is quite warm and friendly to those she trusts. After Hideout Door is cancelled, Aoki resolves to return to shōjo, although she is later convinced to stay on working for Shōnen Jump. She works on the serialized series The Time of Green Leaves, and she does her own drawings with assistance from Shinta Fukuda. She and Hiramaru gradually develop a relationship, which eventually leads to them getting engaged. Her favorite manga is Kimi ni Todoke.

==== Koji Makaino ====
Voiced by: Showtaro Morikubo

Koji Makaino (間界野昂次) is a musician who aspires to be a manga artist. His work "Colorfusical" placed second in the Tezuka Awards and is a finalist in the Gold Future Cup. He reveals in the news that he is the musician known as "Koogy" in order to get more votes,^{Ch. 29} but fails to land a series.^{Vol. 4} At the Jump corporate party, he is the featured entertainer where he announces a partnership with Aoki when she considers moving to Jump Square, but this too is short-lived.^{Ch. 37}

==== Kazuya Hiramaru ====
Voiced by: Masakazu Morita
Portrayed by: Hirofumi Arai (film), Yuu Fukuzawa (play)

Kazuya Hiramaru (平丸 一也, Hiramaru Kazuya) is introduced as a 26-year-old manga artist who quit his office job to draw manga after he picked up Shōnen Jump one day for the first time in his life and decided that drawing manga would be far less troublesome than office work.^{Ch. 33} His first work, Otter No. 11 receives an honorable mention and becomes serialized around the same time as Mashiro and Takagi's work, though he has no experience or background knowledge with manga. Hiramaru is easily overwhelmed and finds it hard to deal with the stress of writing manga, having initially believed that being a manga artist would be an easy job. He sometimes hides in the other manga artists' studios.^{Vol. 5} His editor manages to persuade him to continue by offering to help him get closer to Kō Aoki, as he is attracted to her; his attempts, however, usually end badly, but in chapter 114 he finally asks Aoki out. Due to his success, he has been called a manga genius possibly on the level of Eiji Nizuma, especially considering his inexperience and relative lack of interest in writing manga. His manga's successful stories stem from Kazuya's own negativity; if he becomes cheerier, his work suffers. Until near the end of the series Hiramaru's art was rather poor, which gave it votes from fans of comedy; however, Nakai (under Yoshida's orders) helped Hiramaru improve his drawing skills.

==== Aiko Iwase ====
Voiced by: Ayumi Fujimura (Japanese); Veronica Taylor (English)

Aiko Iwase (岩瀬 愛子, Iwase Aiko) is a former classmate of Mashiro and Takagi's during junior high school, where she is known for scoring high on school rankings. She assumes she and Takagi are a couple because he took her hand and accepted her statement of inspiring each other, although Takagi assumed she meant as academic rivals. Takagi later turns her down after she states that she disapproves of his writing manga.^{Ch. 11} She reappears as a student at To-Oh University along with Kō Aoki. Under the pen name Aiko Akina (秋名愛子, Akina Aiko), she writes her first novel while in University, which she expects will impress Takagi. However, Takagi's refusal to say that novels are better than manga angers Iwase, who decides to write a manga for Shōnen Jump to prove her superiority. Her editor is originally Hattori, who sees her talent and believes her rivalry with Takagi will be an excellent way to spur Ashirogi for their next series. However, she is frustrated that Takagi does not return her feelings even though he admits that she is more talented than Miyoshi. After Takagi marries Miyoshi, she transfers her feelings to Hattori, who finds the relationship uncomfortable enough to bring the issue to his captain. Miura is assigned as her editor, while Hattori reassigned to Ashirogi for their upcoming series; the change angers her, especially because she feels Miura is less skilled than Hattori. Her writing and plot are praised as very well made and she is the writer of +Natural. Her favorite manga is Adolf ni Tsugu.

==== Shoyo Takahama ====
Voiced by: Hiroki Shimowada

Shoyo Takahama (高浜昇陽, Takahama Shoyo) is introduced as a 19-year-old rookie assistant for Ashirogi on Detective Trap.^{Ch. 35} While he is initially the least social of Ashirogi's three assistants, he gradually opens up to Mashiro, and expresses that he aspires to work for Disney.^{Ch. 39} He eventually gets his own series in Jump, Business Boy Kenichi with Nakai and Kato as his assistants and Gorō Miura as his editor. However, the series eventually gets cancelled. Without a series of his own, Takahama returns to being Muto Ashirogi's assistant for their next series Tanto, but eventually gets another series, Seigi no Mikata (Mikata's Justice), which winds up being very successful. Both Mashiro and Takagi think highly of him and value his opinion on manga, and Takahama often expresses his frustration towards Miura when the two groups share the same editor.

==== Ryu Shizuka ====
Ryu Shizuka (静河 流, Shizuka Ryū) is an 18-year-old newcomer manga artist who submits a manga called Shapon (The End of Japan) for an issue of Treasure. Nizuma considers him and his story to be second only to Mashiro and Takagi's manga in the same issue, stating that he was amazing and deep, and would have won if he had not been up against Muto Ashirogi. Because of the dark subject matter of his manga, he is working with a young editor named Yamahisa to make it more Jump-friendly. He has social anxiety disorder and is reluctant to talk to his editor face-to-face, instead preferring to have his meetings over the Internet. He is a recluse who has spent much of his time in his room with video games and computer since the eighth grade and is sensitive to the words of others. He starts to become more comfortable talking with Yamahisa further on in the story and Yamahisa later helps him buy his own apartment and begin conversing with people. Ryu's work eventually becomes much more lighter; he is last seen saying his next work will be one focusing on hope. His favorite manga is Level E.

==== Shun Shiratori ====
Voiced by: Yūichi Iguchi

Shun Shiratori (白鳥 シュン, Shiratori Shun) is one of Ashirogi's assistants when Perfect Crime Party begins publication. He comes from a very wealthy family and is somewhat sheltered, so he does not know basic things like how to run a washing machine. Shiratori is a very talented artist, though his mother disapproves of his decision to become a manga artist because she does not find is respectable. After meeting Ashirogi and their other assistants, Shiratori is encouraged to pursue his dream to become a manga artist and creates his own series, Rabuta and Peace, based on himself and his dog, Peace, with some initial help from Takagi. Thanks to the Ashirogi team and his older sister Hitomi, Shiratori stands up to his mother, who reluctantly allows Shiratori to live on his own and follow his own path. Though Rabuta and Peace is eventually cancelled, he decides to continue as a manga artist. Among the characters, he is the only one whose story is left unresolved.

==== Toru Nanamine ====
Voiced by: Shinnosuke Tachibana

Toru Nanamine (七峰 透, Nanamine Tōru) is a manga artist who was inspired by the early works of Muto Ashirogi and attempts to surpass them. He is however also highly distrustful of the editor-author relationship and creates a scheme to undermine it. While Nanamine initially appears as an extremely enthusiastic individual, he is actually sly and supremely arrogant, believing that no opinion other than his own matters and angrily lashing out when his assertions do not hold true. In particular, he believes the more reader opinions one can obtain beforehand, and the more suggestions can be incorporated into the manga, the better the manga will be. As a result, he uses unscrupulous means and regards his editor, Kosugi, with great contempt. Though Nanamine is a skillful artist, the means he uses to construct his story result in an increasingly fractured plot and he is eventually forced to concede to the stronger Ashirogi team when his dwindling pool of online advisors abandon him after learning how he lied to them. He later returns using an even less ethical method of using paid advisors to create the perfect manga for himself, initially testing the system with veteran manga creators and abandoning them. The act outrages the majority of manga creators and editors; the editor in chief only allows Nanamine to submit his work when Ashirogi and other artists express the desire to defeat him in direct competition. However, Nanamine fails to obtain one of the top three spots in the rankings and is banned from Shōnen Jump, as stipulated by the editor in chief; ironically, the third spot that got Nanamine out of the rankings is taken by a one-shot from Mikihiko Azuma, one of the washed-out manga artist employed and later discarded by his latter scheme.

=== Assistants ===
==== Naoto Ogawa ====
Voiced by: Yoshimitsu Shimoyama

Naoto Ogawa (小河 直人, Ogawa Naoto) is Ashirogi's lead assistant during the serialization of Detective Trap.^{Ch. 35} He is 31 years old,^{Ch. 35} and has a wife and three kids. In addition to his work for Shōnen Jump, he also works as an assistant for Shonen 3. While he is careful to balance his work and family life, Ogawa sincerely cares about the quality of his employer's work. After "Trap" ends, he does not return until Ashirogi decides to hire a fourth assistant for the serialization of Reversi, during which he helped Mashiro manage deadlines and brought in two extra assistants when the Ashirogi team fell behind attempting to complete three storyboards simultaneously.

==== Natsumi Kato ====
Voiced by: Yoko Honda

Natsumi Kato (加藤奈津実, Katou Natsumi) is a bespectacled assistant who works for Ashirogi during the serialization of Detective Trap. She has worked a year in shonen and a year in shojo.^{Ch. 35} She develops a crush on Mashiro, but gives up after meeting Azuki during Mashiro's hospitalization.^{Vol. 6} After "Trap" is canceled, she becomes Takahama's assistant on Business Boy Kenichi, where she forms a friendly relationship with Nakai, until he misconstrues her amiability as romantic. She later assists Aoki on Time of Greenery, and returns to assist Ashirogi when Shun Shiratori resigns to work on his own manga series. She is friends with rookie voice actress Ririka Kitami, who is more oblivious and emotional than Kato; she often has to correct or pacify Ririka when she's thinking about something. Her favorite manga is said to be either The Rose of Versailles or Glass Mask.^{Vol. 16 ch 140}

==== Ichiriki Orihara ====
Voiced by: Kazuyuki Okitsu

Ichiriki Orihara (折原一力, Orihara Ichiriki) is introduced as Ashirogi's new assistant during their serialization of Vroom! Tanto Daihatsu. Energetic, cheerful, and talkative, he is very supportive of Ashirogi and genuinely enjoys working for them. After Takagi and Mashiro choose to end "Tanto," he agrees to work for them without pay and taking non-assistant work as a part-time job until they got a new series. Orihara remains Ashirogi's assistant during Perfect Crime Party and Reversi. Like Eiji Nizuma, Orihara is a bottomless pit, able to eat large amounts of food without suffering a stomach-ache. He also reads Tozai Sports; coincidentally, it was because of this that he was to show Mashiro and Takagi the negative take the newspaper did on the relationship between Miho and Mashiro. His favorite manga is Slam Dunk.

==== Shuichi Moriya ====
Voiced by: Mitsuhiro Sawamaki

Shūichi Moriya (森屋秀一, Moriya Shuuji) is one of Ashirogi's assistants for Perfect Crime Party and Reversi. He is a year younger than Mashiro and Takagi. After he became a finalist in the Tezuka Award, he decided to drop out of design school and concentrate on manga, which he regards as an art form that deserves more respect. While he is also an aspiring manga artist with excellent drawing skills, editors have remarked that his works tend to lecture at audiences and need to be simplified. Though he did not get along with Shiratori at first because Shiratori considered manga a commercialized product, they manage to reconcile their views thanks to Mashiro. As an assistant, he is dedicated and supportive; although he dislikes Ogawa for becoming Ashirogi's head assistant during Reversi because Ogawa will leave while the other assistants stayed behind, he comes to respect Ogawa when he returns at a critical hour with two additional assistants to help meet an important deadline. One of Moriya's favorite manga appears to be Osamu Tezuka's Phoenix.

==== Hiromi Yasuoka ====
Voiced by: Yoshihisa Kawahara

Hiromi Yasuoka (安岡ひろみ, Yasuoka Hiromi) is Fukuda's assistant, the only assistant that Fukuda has until the serialization of Road Racer Giri. He sports a mohawk is an avid admirer of Fukuda, often commenting about how cool Fukuda is, and Fukuda will often pay Yasuoka for any good ideas he comes up with.

=== Weekly Shōnen Jump editors ===
Some of the Weekly Shōnen Jump editors interact with the characters in Bakuman. They are organized in groups under deputy editors that compete against each other to select manga that are suitable finalists for their Tezuka Awards, as well as determining inclusion and serialization in their publications.^{Vol. 2}

==== Akira Hattori ====
Voiced by: Kentaro Tone (Japanese); Wayne Grayson (English)
Portrayed by: Takayuki Yamada (film), Tomoharu Hasegawa (play)

Akira Hattori (服部 哲, Hattori Akira) is Mashiro and Takagi's first editor. Although he does not want the two to experience success too rapidly, he encourages them to continue making manga and accepts their works for submission to the various contests and publications in Jump.^{Vol. 2} After Detective Trap becomes serialized, however, Hattori loses them to Gorō Miura due to conflicting responsibilities, and soon becomes Aiko Iwase's editor. After The Perfect Crime Party is serialized, Hattori returns as Muto Ashirogi's editor, leading Miura to edit Iwase's work. He is somewhat of a schemer and likes to plot both behind other editors and even his own manga artists to advance the interests of the magazine. As such he came up with the idea of having Nizuma and Iwase collaborate on +Natural in order to inspire Mashiro and Takagi to work harder. His favorite manga is Cobra.

==== Goro Miura ====
Voiced by: Daisuke Kirii

Goro Miura (港浦 吾郎, Miura Gorō) is Mashiro and Takagi's editor between the start of Detective Trap^{Ch. 35} and the serialization of Perfect Crime Party. Initially he is very enthusiastic but naive and somewhat incompetent due to lack of experience. He is desperate to get one of his series serialized in order to protect his job, and believes that gag manga have a better chance of doing so. This often clashes with Mashiro and Takagi's approach, leading to some arguments. Over time, and through the tutelage of Hattori, he becomes more flexible and his personal desires do not come into play as often, and Ashirogi come to accept him as an editor. He is also the editor for Takahama's Business Boy Kenichi and Seigi no Mikata and eventually becomes Iwase's editor. His favorite manga is Jungle King Tar-chan.

==== Hisashi Sasaki ====
Voiced by: Kenyuu Horiuchi (Japanese); Dan Green (English)
Portrayed by: Lily Franky (film), Mitsuru Karahashi (play)

Hisashi Sasaki (佐々木尚, Sasaki Hisashi) is the editor-in-chief of Weekly Shōnen Jump. Earlier in his career he had worked with Moritaka's uncle Nobuhiro as his editor. He eventually had to break the news that Nobuhiro would have to leave Shōnen Jump, leading to his unemployment and eventual death. Despite his stoic and stern demeanor, he is very passionate about what he does. Sasaki also likes to delegate responsibilities when able in order to give his subordinates experience. When dealing with the manga artists, he does not hesitate to put them in their place and will resort to trickery, much like Hattori, to make them see what will happen. Sasaki later becomes the editor in chief of the fictional new monthly magazine, Hisshou Jump. The character is based on the real person of the same name who was the editor-in-chief of Weekly Shōnen Jump from 2008 to 2011, coinciding with the majority of Bakuman's serialization.

==== Yoshihisa Heishi ====
Voiced by: Shinji Kawada

Yoshihisa Heishi (瓶子吉久, Heishi Yoshihisa) is the Deputy Chief Editor of Weekly Shōnen Jump. He has a serious personality and usually follows Sasaki's orders but does appear to have his own reservations sometimes. He is later promoted to Editor-in-Chief following Sasaki's move to Hisshou Jump. After his promotion, his personality alters somewhat; he becomes more open about his opinions, often dramatically leaving a room after giving one. The character is based on the real person of the same name who took over as editor-in-chief of Weekly Shōnen Jump from Sasaki in 2011, and held the position until mid-2017.

==== Soichi Aida ====
Voiced by: Yūto Kazama

Soichi Aida (相田聡一, Aida Souichi) is one of the editor team-leaders at Shōnen Jump, with both Hattori and Miura in his team. He is also the editor of Aoki-Nakai's manga Hideout Door. He gives helpful advice to Miura on occasion but is troubled by the stirs Ashirogi is causing. He later becomes deputy chief editor.

==== Yujiro Hattori ====
Voiced by: Hirofumi Nojima (Japanese); Chris Niosi (English)

Yujirou Hattori (服部 雄二郎, Hattori Yūjirō) is one of the youngest editors at Shōnen Jump and editor of Eiji Nizuma's successful manga Crow as well as Fukuda's Kiyoshi Knight and later Road Racer Giri. Yujiro has difficulty keeping Eiji in line, but prides himself on finding such a talented manga artist. Because he shares the same last name as Akira, he is referred to by his first name while Akira as referred to as "Hattori". He finds it difficult to get along with Nizuma and Fukuda at first due to their eccentric or brash personalities, but soon becomes accustomed to them. Due to his success, he later becomes a team leader and matures as an editor as he learns to take into consideration the factors that allow manga creators and their editors need to succeed.

==== Koji Yoshida ====
Voiced by: Takehito Koyasu

Koji Yoshida (吉田 幸司, Yoshida Kōji) is an editor team-leader at Shōnen Jump and the editor of Hiramaru. A perceptive and astute editor, Yoshida's editing style is unscrupulous and he will use any means to get his authors to work. In Hiramaru's case he uses bait in various forms, lies about this bait, and exploits of Hiramaru's interest in Aoki. He also tricks Hiramaru in buying an expensive car and renting an expensive apartment to keep him from saving up money and forcing him to continue to work. When interacting with Hiramaru, Yoshida's face is usually not visible for the reader, though Yoshida appears in full in the editing department, as a reflection of their antagonistic relationship. His ability to manipulate Hiramaru lessens over time, particularly when Hiramaru makes it apparent he is aware of Yoshida's machinations when he complains that Yoshida needs to be more effective, though Hiramaru comes to trust that Yoshida does seem to want what is best for him. Though his manipulations do not seem to work after Hiramaru is engaged to Aoki, Yoshida's lies seem sufficient to manipulate Nakai into assisting Hiramaru. The character is based on the real person of the same name who was Ohba and Obata's editor for the entirely of Death Note. The real Koji later said he was not happy about a character in the series sharing his name.

==== Masakazu Yamahisa ====
Voiced by: Manabu Sakamaki

Masakazu Yamahisa (山久 雅和, Yamahisa Masakazu) is the editor behind Aoki's Time of Green Leaves and the editor of Ryu Shizuka. Yamahisa is a smooth-talker and attempts to garner the trust of his manga artist by reading their emotions. He personally decides to become Aoki's editor, seeing her marketability as a female manga artist, and helps her achieve success as a manga artist in Shōnen Jump by playing to her strengths in writing romantic or fantasy stories. As Shizuka's editor, Yamahisa seems genuinely concerned for Shizuka because of his lack of social skills, taking it upon himself to civilize him to the point of taking him out to hostess bars (which was one of many options he listed). While some of Yamahisa's attempt to help Shizuka backfire, they ultimate contribute to Shizuka's ability to create an interesting manga series and allow Shizuka's confidence grow. By the end of the series, Yamahisa is shocked to see how cheerful Shizuka has become from his times out of his apartment; before this, he often had to track him down when he was not making manga like he was supposed to.

==== Tatsurou Kosugi ====
Voiced by: Yuki Kaji

Tatsurou Kosugi (小杉 達郎, Kosugi Tatsurō) is the editor of Toru Nanamine and the newest member of Jump's Editorial Department. Due to his inexperience and subservient personality he is an easy prey for Nanamine to exploit at first, but learns to become more assertive over time. He believes that his lack of experience is partially responsible Nanamine's disrespect towards the editorial department. Though Nanamine never shows any respect or any intent to listen to Kosugi's suggestions, Kosugi never wavers in his attempts to help Nanamine and expresses some remorse that Jump has lost a talented artist after Nanamine's final scheme fails and he is given a lifetime ban from Jump. At the end of the series, Kosugi is assigned to become the editor of Iwase and deal with her forceful personality much like Miura had before.

== Works cited ==
- "Vol." and "Ch." is shortened form for volume and chapter, referring to a volume or chapter number in the Bakuman manga
