= Bakuman =

Japanese manga series

- First tankōbon volume cover, featuring Moritaka Mashiro

バクマン。
- Genre: Comedy; Coming-of-age; Slice of life
- Manga
- Written by: Tsugumi Ohba
- Illustrated by: Takeshi Obata
- Published by: Shueisha
- English publisher: AUS: Madman Entertainment; NA: Viz Media
- Imprint: Jump Comics
- Magazine: Weekly Shōnen Jump
- English magazine: NA: Weekly Shonen Jump Alpha
- Original run: August 11, 2008 – April 23, 2012
- Volumes: 20
- Anime television series
- Directed by: Kenichi Kasai; Noriaki Akitaya
- Written by: Reiko Yoshida
- Music by: Audio Highs
- Studio: J.C.Staff
- Licensed by: AUS: Madman Entertainment; NA: Viz Media; UK: Kaze UK
- Original network: NHK Educational TV
- Original run: October 2, 2010 – March 30, 2013
- Episodes: 75
- Video game

Bakuman.: Mangaka e no Michi
- Developer: Namco Bandai Games
- Publisher: Namco Bandai Games
- Genre: Visual novel, Puzzle game
- Platform: Nintendo DS
- Released: JP: December 15, 2011
- Novel

PCP -Perfect Crime Party-
- Written by: Sei Hatsuno
- Published by: Shueisha
- Imprint: Jump J-Books
- Published: October 2, 2015
- Related media
- Bakuman (2015 film)
- icon

Bakuman (バクマン。; stylized as BAKUMAN。) is a Japanese manga series written by Tsugumi Ohba and illustrated by Takeshi Obata, the same creative team responsible for Death Note. It was serialized in Shueisha's shōnen manga magazine Weekly Shōnen Jump from August 2008 to April 2012, with its 176 chapters collected into 20 tankōbon volumes. The story follows talented artist Moritaka Mashiro and aspiring writer Akito Takagi, two ninth grade boys who wish to become manga artists, with Mashiro as the illustrator and Takagi as the writer. Some characters resemble real authors and editors of Weekly Shōnen Jump, and many manga titles mentioned in Bakuman have actually been published in the magazine.

It is the first manga released online by Shueisha in multiple languages before becoming available in print outside Japan. In 2009, Viz Media licensed the manga for English release in North America. Besides releasing the series in collected volumes, they also released it in their online manga anthology Weekly Shonen Jump Alpha. A 75-episode anime television adaptation of the series by J.C.Staff was broadcast for three seasons on NHK Educational TV from October 2010 to March 2013. A live-action film adaptation was released in October 2015.

Bakuman topped the Kono Manga ga Sugoi! list for male readers in 2010, was the seventh best-selling manga series of 2011 and the 10th best of 2012. The manga has over 15 million copies in circulation.

== Plot ==
When Moritaka Mashiro, a middle school student, forgets his notebook in class, he finds his classmate, Akito Takagi, who notes Mashiro's drawings. Takagi asks him to become a manga artist to his stories. However, Mashiro declines, citing his late manga artist uncle, who died from overworking. Takagi incites Mashiro to meet with Miho Azuki, Mashiro's crush, and tells her the two plan to become manga artists. In response, Azuki reveals her plans to be a voice actress. Mashiro proposes to her that they should both marry when Azuki becomes a voice actress for the anime adaptation of their manga. She accepts, but under the condition that they not meet face-to-face again until then. The two boys then start creating manga, under the pen name Muto Ashirogi, in hopes of getting serialized in Weekly Shōnen Jump.

After submitting many one-shots to Shueisha, Ashirogi begin their first serialized manga in Weekly Shōnen Jump, Detective Trap (疑探偵TRAP（ぎたんていトラップ）, Gitantei Torappu), which is eventually canceled due to its declining popularity, after Mashiro is hospitalized for overworking on it. Their next series is the gag manga Vroom, Tanto Daihatsu (走れ!大発タント, Hashire! Daihatsu Tanto), which they give up on, realizing it will never be popular, coupled with Takagi's difficulty with writing rapid-fire humor. After being challenged by the editor-in-chief of Jump to create a superior manga to their rival's, Ashirogi develops their current series Perfect Crime Party (PCP -完全犯罪党-, PCP -Kanzen Hanzaitō-). It is met with considerable popularity but due to its theme, is unfit for an anime series. When their rival, Eiji Nizuma, submits a one-shot for serialization, Ashirogi competes by submitting Reversi which replaces Perfect Crime Party while the latter is moved to Shueisha's fictional monthly magazine, Hisshou Jump. After many conflicts involving the graphic novel sales and the voice actress choice, Reversi is chosen for an anime adaptation with Miho as the primary actress, after she passes a public audition. After fulfilling their dreams, the series ends with Mashiro officially proposing to Miho at the place they made their promise, the front gate of Miho's old home, followed by their first kiss.

== Production ==
Tsugumi Ohba came up the idea for Bakuman after thinking of all the people who long to be manga artists. Because he is in the industry, he felt he could create a manga about manga. Takeshi Obata, illustrator of the series, said that the title "means bakuhatsu (explosion), bakuchi (gamble) and baku (an animal that supposedly eats dreams)… It has many meanings to it, and I think it's a very fun title." Ohba said that for the fictional manga created in the series, he did not worry about the plot and settings, only focusing on "cranking them out." He revealed that he did actually make storyboards for the fictional The Classroom of Truth, and one he created for Otter No. 11 is actually seen in Bakuman.

When creating a chapter, Ohba did not meet with Obata. He would discuss things with his editor and create storyboards that were given to Obata. Obata then would create his own storyboards that were given to Ohba and their editor. The author said only minor changes were ever made and they never had disagreements. Obata said that when he started the manga, he struggled with the large amount of dialogue and information, not having enough space to draw the detailed backgrounds that he wanted. But he eventually realized that the dialogue is "the main character" of the series and shifted to making the art as unobtrusive as possible, such as using simple camera angles so that the composition was not too elaborate and the text could be read smoothly. Ohba referred to Bakuman as "a weird series." He revealed that the hardest part was coming up with new ideas as the story kept getting longer. But said because of this, he was able to include stories that he never initially considered.

When asked how accurate the manga process depicted in Bakuman is to reality, current Weekly Shōnen Jump editor-in-chief Hiroyuki Nakano said that as a work of fiction, some things are exaggerated for dramatic effect, "But it takes a lot of details from real life, so I think it's quite close." Bakuman features many homages to Fujiko A. Fujio's Manga Michi, a semi-autobiographical manga series with a similar premise that Obata is a big fan of.

== Media ==
=== Manga ===
Written by Tsugumi Ohba and illustrated by Takeshi Obata, Bakuman was serialized in Shueisha's shōnen manga magazine Weekly Shōnen Jump from August 11, 2008, to April 23, 2012. The 176 chapters were then collected into 20 tankōbon volumes from January 5, 2009, to July 4, 2012. A 15-page one-shot of the series Otter No. 11 (ラッコ11号, Rakko 11-gō), the gag manga created by the character Kazuya Hiramaru in Bakuman, was published in the August 8, 2010, issue of Weekly Shōnen Jump. It was then published the following week in Shōnen Jump Next on August 16. In commemoration of the live-action film release, two new chapters were created by Ohba and Obata under the titles Age 13 and Age 14. They are set before Takagi and Mashiro first met, with the first chapter published in Weekly Shōnen Jump on September 21 and the second on September 28, 2015. The two chapters were also included in the bunkoban edition of Bakuman, published in 12 volumes between July 18 and December 15, 2017.

Several chapters of the series were released on Jumpland's official website in Japanese, English, French, and German; the first chapter released on August 19, 2008. It is Shueisha's first manga to be released online in multiple languages before becoming available in print outside Japan. At San Diego Comic-Con in 2009, Viz Media announced it had licensed the series for English release in the US and Canada. The 20 volumes were published from August 3, 2010, to August 6, 2013. In addition to the collected volumes, Viz also published the series online in their manga anthology Weekly Shonen Jump Alpha (now known as simply Weekly Shonen Jump). Bakuman started with chapter 162 in the anthology's debut issue on January 30, 2012, and ended with the series' final chapter released on May 7, 2012. Viz digitally released the two Bakuman. Age 13 chapters in Weekly Shonen Jump on the same days that they ran in Japan.

=== Anime ===
A 25-episode anime television series based on Bakuman was announced in Weekly Shōnen Jump's second issue of 2010. Produced by J.C.Staff, it began broadcasting on NHK on October 2, 2010, and ran until April 2, 2011. In December 2010, Weekly Shōnen Jump announced that a second season would air in Fall 2011; it ran from October 1, 2011, to March 24, 2012. A third and final season was announced in the 3/4th (2012) combined issue of Weekly Shōnen Jump and began airing on October 6, 2012. It ran for 25 episodes between October 6, 2012, and March 30, 2013.

In August 2011, Media Blasters licensed the first two seasons of the Bakuman anime for North America, including an English-language dub. The first seven episodes were included on a 2-disc DVD set released on November 22, 2011, however, the second was halted in February 2012. The first Blu-ray release was cancelled indefinitely in June 2012. Viz Media Europe acquired the rights for release in Europe and the United Kingdom in March 2012, in collaboration with Manga Entertainment and Kazé. After Media Blasters' cancellation, Kazé revealed the UK release would be subtitled only. In November 2012, Media Blasters officially announced they are discontinuing the series, but added that Viz Media might pick up the license for NA.

=== Live-action ===
A live-action film adaptation of Bakuman was released on October 3, 2015. Written and directed by Hitoshi Ōne (Moteki), the film stars Takeru Satoh as Moritaka Mashiro and Ryunosuke Kamiki as Akito Takagi. Japanese rock band Sakanaction performed the soundtrack, Motion Music of Bakuman, including the theme song "Shin Takarajima", which they released as a single four days before the film's release.

A play adaptation, Bakuman The Stage, ran at three locations in Tokyo and Osaka throughout October 2021. Written and directed by Worry Kinoshita, it starred Hiroki Suzuki as Mashiro and Yoshihiko Aramaki as Takagi. A recorded performance was released on home video on March 29, 2022.

=== Other media ===
Bakuman received a four-episode Vomic adaptation, where voice actors, music and sound effects are heard as the manga images appear on screen, that was broadcast on the TV show Sakiyomi Jum-Bang! in June 2009. Mashiro and Takagi were voiced by Jun Fukuyama and Shinnosuke Tachibana respectively.

A video game based on Bakuman was made for the Nintendo DS by Namco Bandai Games. Bakuman.: Mangaka e no Michi (バクマン。マンガ家への道; "Bakuman.: The Road to Becoming a Manga Artist") was released in Japan on December 15, 2011.

Two novels based on the fictional Otter No. 11 manga created by Kazuya Hiramaru in Bakuman were released by Shueisha on December 29, 2011, and July 4, 2012. Both were written by Shō Hinata, although Hiramaru is credited with the original story. A novel titled PCP -Perfect Crime Party- and based on the fictional manga of the same name created by Takagi and Mashiro in Bakuman was released by Shueisha on October 2, 2015. It was written by Sei Hatsuno, although Takagi and Mashiro's fictional pen name "Muto Ashirogi" is credited with the original story.

== Reception ==
Bakuman was chosen as the best manga for male readers in the 2010 Kono Manga ga Sugoi! guidebook, which surveys people in the manga and publishing industry. It was nominated for the third annual Manga Taishō award in 2010. The first volume of the series placed fourth on the Oricon manga chart during its debut week, selling 154,675 copies. The second volume followed suit, placing second during its first week with 228,056 copies. The third volume continued the trend and placed fourth during its debut week, selling 200,369 copies. During the first half of 2009, the first volume placed twenty-eighth and the second volume placed twenty-seventh on Oricon's list of fifty top-selling manga in Japan, selling 381,633 and 394,567 copies respectively. Bakuman was the seventh best-selling manga series of 2011, with almost 4.4 million copies sold, and the tenth best of 2012, with over 3.2 million sold that year. By April 2012, over 13 million copies had been sold, with this number growing to over 15 million copies in publication by May 2014. In the United States, volume one debuted at number 6 on The New York Times Manga Graphic Books list for the week of August 12 and remained on the list for eight weeks straight.

Jason Thompson referred to Bakuman. as "a love letter to the manga industry done in old-school shonen manga style." He felt that while it can be "text-heavy" on the process of making manga, it is ultimately a "heroic story of self-improvement, friendship and striving to succeed." Thompson cited the villain characters as the most interesting, but called the series sexist for only portraying its female characters as either "bitter, man-hating viragos motivated by grudges against men" or "patient helpmates" striving to support them instead. Carlo Santos of Anime News Network was surprised that Bakuman succeeds, not only as a manga about manga, but as a slice-of-life story about the dreams of youth. Although he praised the conflicting viewpoints of the protagonists, Santos remarked that the series could learn from Ohba and Obata's previous serial Death Note; commenting that the beginning is not as gripping and the plot twists are "pretty weak" and "seem like petty contrivances." Despite this, he believes that the series is "another hit." Allegra Frank of Polygon seems to disagree with Santos' criticism, calling Bakuman. a "sweet, funny page-turner" that is gripping right from the start just like Death Note, only in "a completely different, far more low-key way".

Christopher Butcher reviewing volume one for About.com had strong praise for the art, calling it "quite possibly the best-drawn manga out today." He also enjoyed the behind-the-scenes information on the manga industry. Like Thompson, Butcher did state that while he enjoyed it, he has reservations about recommending Bakuman. because it is "horribly sexist." In an article discussing the underdevelopment of its female lead characters, Gregory Segal of Comic Book Resources wrote that some fans speculate the series' inclusion of such tropes is a form of meta-commentary on the traditional portrayal of women in shōnen manga.

The film was number-one at the Japanese box office on its opening weekend, with US$2.1 million. It earned US$1.15 million during the October 18 weekend. At the 39th Japan Academy Prize awards, its editor Yasuyuki Ōzeki won the Japan Academy Prize for Best Film Editing award, while Sakanaction's Motion Music of Bakuman won the Outstanding Achievement in Music award. The film was also one of two releases that won the Popularity award, alongside Maku ga Agaru. Matt Schley of Otaku USA wrote that Bakuman. is "a real celebration of and testament to the unique power of Japan's comics culture" and the best live-action manga adaptation he's seen this year. Kotaku's Toshi Nakamura also suggested that it is possibly the best live-action manga adaptation he's seen. However, he said the motivational romance between Mashiro and Azuki was "surprisingly inconsequential" and boring. Mark Schilling for The Japan Times gave the film four out of five stars, with strong praise for director and screenwriter Hitoshi Ōne.
