= Bakuman (film) =

2015 Japanese film by Hitoshi Ōne

- Theatrical release poster
- Kanji: バクマン。
- Directed by: Hitoshi Ōne
- Screenplay by: Hitoshi Ōne
- Based on: Bakuman by: Tsugumi Ohba; Takeshi Obata
- Produced by: Minami Ichikawa
- Starring: Takeru Satoh; Ryūnosuke Kamiki
- Cinematography: Wataru Miyamoto
- Edited by: Yasuyuki Ōzeki
- Music by: Sakanaction
- Production companies: Toho Eiga; Office Crescendo
- Distributed by: Toho
- Release date: October 3, 2015
- Running time: 120 minutes
- Country: Japan
- Language: Japanese
- Box office: $13.6 million

Bakuman (Japanese: バクマン。) is a 2015 Japanese coming-of-age comedy film written and directed by Hitoshi Ōne, based on the manga of the same name by Tsugumi Ohba and Takeshi Obata. It tells the story of two Japanese high school students who attempt to break into the competitive world of manga. The film was produced by Minami Ichikawa, with music by the band Sakanaction, and distributed by Toho. It stars Takeru Satoh, Ryūnosuke Kamiki, Shota Sometani, Nana Komatsu, Kenta Kiritani, and Hirofumi Arai.

Bakuman opened at number one at the Japanese box office on October 3, 2015, and has grossed over $13 million. It was nominated for several awards, winning Best Picture at the 25th Japanese Professional Movie Awards. It also earned Ōne Best Director at the 35th Japanese Movie Critics Awards and Yasuyuki Ōzeki the Japan Academy Prize for Best Film Editing.

== Plot ==
High school classmates Moritaka Mashiro and Akito Takagi, one an artist, the other a writer, decide to team up to create a successful manga series. Moritaka desires to impress his crush, Miho Azuki, with whom he makes a promise to have voice a character in the anime adaptation of one of his works and marry once he has a successful manga. Mashiro and Takagi successfully pitch a manga to Weekly Shōnen Jump, the biggest manga magazine in Japan, which wins second place at the Tezuka Awards. The two make friends with Shinta Fukuda, Kazuya Hiramaru, and Takuro Nakai, three manga creators who also entered the competition. But, it is fellow high school student Eiji Nizuma who bests them in the competition and becomes their rival.

Shortly following the other four, Mashiro and Takagi eventually get serialized in Weekly Shōnen Jump. Under the wing of their editor Akira Hattori, the two vow to beat Eiji and be the first to get to the top spot in the magazine's readers' ranking. When Mashiro has a health issue, Weekly Shōnen Jump editor-in-chief Sasaki decides to put their manga on hiatus until they graduate. However, with the help of their friends, Mashiro and Takagi create a chapter that not only has Sasaki change his mind, but also reaches number one in the rankings. However, their manga is cancelled shortly after. The film ends on Mashiro and Takagi's last day of high school, with the two enthusiastically discussing plans for their next manga.

== Cast ==
- Takeru Satoh as Moritaka Mashiro
- Ryūnosuke Kamiki as Akito Takagi
- Shota Sometani as Eiji Nizuma, a high school manga artist who is considered a genius.
- Nana Komatsu as Miho Azuki, Mashiro's school crush who dreams of becoming a voice actress.
- Kenta Kiritani as Shinta Fukuda
- Hirofumi Arai as Kazuya Hiramaru
- Sarutoki Minagawa as Takuro Nakai
- Kankurō Kudō as Taro Kawaguchi, Mashiro's uncle and the manga artist of Bakuman, who died several years earlier due to overwork.
- Takayuki Yamada as Akira Hattori, an editor at Weekly Shōnen Jump who takes on Mashiro and Takagi.
- Lily Franky as Sasaki, editor-in-chief of Weekly Shōnen Jump. He was Taro Kawaguchi's editor on Bakuman.

== Production ==
Director and screenwriter Hitoshi Ōne initially turned down the offer to adapt Bakuman to live-action film. He felt that the meta-aspect of a Weekly Shōnen Jump manga about Weekly Shōnen Jump manga would be lost in another medium. But after re-reading the series, he realized it is a coming-of-age story at heart and changed his mind. He also liked how there were many homages to Fujiko A. Fujio's Manga Michi, a personal favorite of his. Ōne wanted Bakuman to be a story about "friendship, effort, and victory", the motto of Weekly Shōnen Jump, and a buddy story between two men, but to also have a team feel. While writing the screenplay, he interviewed the Weekly Shōnen Jump editorial department and many manga artists, including Takeshi Obata, illustrator of the original Bakuman manga. Obata drew some of the manga manuscripts seen in the film, as well as the images that appear on the blackboard in the final scene. The Weekly Shōnen Jump editorial office seen in the film is a faithful recreation of the magazine's actual editorial office.

Ōne said that while writing the script was difficult, having done over 20 drafts, preparing for and casting the film went smoothly. When the cast was revealed, many people felt that Takeru Satoh and Ryūnosuke Kamiki should have been cast in each other's role. The actors themselves were also initially surprised when they were first given their roles. But Ōne decided from the beginning that "manga otaku" Kamiki was more likely to think up a manga story, while the stoic Satoh would be able to show his heart honestly, and the actors eventually felt it was the right decision as well. Wanting someone who could draw for the part of Taro Kawaguchi, Ōne saw Kankurō Kudō portray Shigeru Mizuki in GeGeGe no Nyōbō and knew he could pull it off. Ōne said of all the manga adaptations he has made, Eiji Nizuma might have been the most difficult character to portray. Due to the time restraint, Nizuma is more of a rival to Mashiro and Takagi in the film, compared to the manga where he becomes their friend too. Akira Hattori also differs from his manga counterpart, with Ōne describing him as a mix of the original character and Monji, the real-life second editor of the Bakuman manga.

Satoh practiced using a G-pen nib about two months before shooting began. The film has an action scene where Mashiro and Takagi "battle" Nizuma with large pens and pencils as swords. Satoh and Kamiki said their experience working opposite one another on Rurouni Kenshin: Kyoto Inferno and Rurouni Kenshin: The Legend Ends made it so that they were comfortable with each other in the fight scene. Satoh and Kamiki ad libbed some of the parts in the film, such as the lines their characters make discussing what kind of manga they want to create when they initially team up, and Takagi's reference to Kyūkyoku!! Hentai Kamen. The scene where the manga artists gather after the award ceremony is an homage to a similar scene in Tokiwa-sō no Seishun, a 1996 film about Tokiwa-sō.

== Soundtrack ==
The soundtrack was written and performed by Japanese band Sakanaction, including the theme song "Shin Takarajima", which they released as a single four days before the film's release. Ōne decides who he wants to provide the music to his films before he starts writing the script or thinking about the cast. He feels that professional film composers are not suitable for his work, and prefers to hire actual artists for the job. Sakanaction were one of many acts he considered, saying he wanted to take advantage of their popularity. It was after seeing them perform live in 2012 that Ōne decided to choose them for Bakuman. Aware of Ōne's reputation and work, being a particularly big fan of the Yura Yura Teikoku concert film Yura Yura Teikoku Live 2005-2009, Sakanaction frontman Ichiro Yamaguchi said he felt that he and the director were both cut from the same cloth and was excited to work with him. After reading the script, Yamaguchi made and sent about 10 demos to Ōne. The demos were then put to footage from the film and they discussed in detail changes to the music based on each scene. Unlike most films where the music is made to match the edited footage, Ōne prefers to edit his films to the music. Yamaguchi said that Sakanaction had self-produced their music up to that point, so it was a new experience for them, as if they were working with a record producer.

== Release ==
The film was released in Japanese theaters on October 3, 2015 by Toho. It was featured at the 2015 Japanese Film Festival in Sydney and Melbourne, Australia.

== Reception ==
Bakuman. opened at number-one at the Japanese box office, with US$2.1 million its opening weekend. It earned US$1.15 million during the October 18 weekend. At the 39th Japan Academy Prize awards, Yasuyuki Ōzeki took home the award for Best Film Editing, while Sakanaction's Motion Music of Bakuman won Outstanding Achievement in Music. Bakuman. was one of two releases that won the Popularity Award, alongside Maku ga Agaru. The other Japan Academy Prize nominations were, Ōne for Director of the Year, Sometani for Outstanding Performance by an Actor in a Supporting Role, Yūji Tsuzuki for Outstanding Achievement in Art Direction, and Shinji Watanabe for Outstanding Achievement in Sound Recording. The staff and cast of Bakuman. won the Special Jury Award at the 37th Yokohama Film Festival, while the film itself came in fourth place on the festival's list of the 10 best Japanese films. Bakuman. took first place and won Best Picture at the 25th Japanese Professional Movie Awards. Ōne won Best Director at the 25th Japanese Movie Critics Awards.

Matt Schley of Otaku USA wrote that Bakuman. is "a real celebration of and testament to the unique power of Japan's comics culture" and the best live-action manga adaptation he's seen this year. Kotaku's Toshi Nakamura also suggested that it is possibly the best live-action manga adaptation he's seen. However, he said the motivational romance between Mashiro and Azuki was "surprisingly inconsequential" and boring. Mark Schilling for The Japan Times gave the film four out of five stars, with strong praise for director and screenwriter Hitoshi Ōne.
