= List of Hikaru no Go chapters =

The cover of Hikaru no Go volume 1 as released by Shueisha on April 30, 1999

Hikaru no Go (ヒカルの碁; lit. "Hikaru's Go") is a coming of age manga, based on the board game Go, written by Yumi Hotta and illustrated by Takeshi Obata. The series was published by Shueisha in its Weekly Shōnen Jump magazine from 1999 to 2003, with the 189 chapters collected into 23 tankōbon volumes.

The series was adapted into a 75-episode anime television series by Studio Pierrot, which was broadcast between 2001 and 2003 on TV Tokyo.

== Volumes ==
| No. | Title | Original release date | English release date |
|---|---|---|---|
| 01 | Descent of the Go Master (棋聖降臨, Kisei Kōrin) | April 30, 1999; 978-4-08-872717-2 | June 16, 2004; 978-1-59116-222-3 |
Game 1: "Descent of the Go Master" (棋聖降臨, Kisei Kōrin); Game 2: "From a Level Beyond" (はるかな高み, Haruka na Takami); Game 3: "Matters of Life and Death" (死活の急所, Shikatsu no Kyūsho); Game 4: "Inexcusable" (許せない暴言, Yurusenai Bōgen); Game 5: "Akira Bares His Fangs" (牙を剝くアキラ, Kiba o Muku Akira); Game 6: "A Decisive Blow" (一刀両断, Ittō Ryōdan); Game 7: "Three Problems of Life and Death" (詰碁三題, Tsumego Sandai)
| 02 | First Battle (初陣, Uijin) | August 4, 1999; 978-4-08-872751-6 | October 12, 2004; 978-1-59116-496-8 |
Game 8: "Want Me to Lose?" (負けようか？, Makeyō ka?); Game 9: "First, Second, and Third" (大将・副将・三将, Taishō Fukushō Sanshō); Game 10: "Debut Match" (初陣, Uijin); Game 11: "An Inkling of an Awakening" (覚醒の予感, Kakusei no Yokan); Game 12: "Gem" (萌芽, Hōga); Game 13: "I'm Not Going to Play You" (おまえとは打たない, Omae to wa Utanai); Game 14: "Better Than The Best" (上には上, Ue ni wa Ue); Game 15: "Mirror Go" (マネ碁, Manego); Game 16: "Conspiracy on a Rainy Day" (雨の中の謀議, Ame no Naka no Bōgi)
| 03 | Preliminary Scrimmage (前哨戦, Zenshōsen) | October 4, 1999; 978-4-08-872777-6 | February 1, 2005; 978-1-59116-687-0 |
Game 17: "Leave the Go Club!" (囲碁部をでてけよ！, Igobu o Deteke yo!); Game 18: "If Only You Weren't Here" (アンタさえいなけりや, Anta sae Inakeri ya); Game 19: "¥1,000 a Game" (一局千円, Ikkyoku Sen'en); Game 20: "The Third Member" (3人目のメンバー, Sanninme no Menbā); Game 21: "A Very Despicable Act" (最も卑劣な行為, Motto mo Hiretsu na Kōi); Game 22: "Hon'inbo Shusaku" (本因坊秀策, Hon'inbō Shūsaku); Game 23: "Kimihiro's Concern" (筒井の懸念, Tsutsui no Kenen); Game 24: "Kaio's Third" (海王の三将, Kaiō no Sanshō); Game 25: "Preliminary Scrimmage" (前哨戦, Zenshōsen)
| 04 | Divine Illusions (神の幻影, Kami no Gen'ei) | December 2, 1999; 978-4-08-872800-1 | May 31, 2005; 978-1-59116-688-7 |
Game 26: "You Play Him" (おまえ打て, Omae Ute); Game 27: "Third Face-off" (3度目の対局, Sandome no Taikyoku); Game 28: "Divine Vision" (神の幻影, Kami no Gen'ei); Game 29: "Zelda" (zelda, Zeruda); Game 30: "Sai" (sai); Game 31: "Who is Sai?" (Who is sai?, Fū Izu Sai?); Game 32: "He Is Not Sai" (He is not sai., Hī Izu Notto Sai.); Game 33: "Akira" (akira); Game 34: "A Memorable Game" (追憶の一局, Tsuioku no Ikkyoku)
| 05 | Start (始動, Shidō) | February 2, 2000; 978-4-08-872826-1 | October 10, 2005; 978-1-59116-689-4 |
Game 35: "Sai vs. Akira" (sai vs akira, Sai bāsasu Akira); Game 36: "Sai's True Identity" (saiの正体, Sai no Shōtai); Game 37: "Second Semester" (2学期, Nigakki); Game 38: "A Thousand Years of Selfishness" (千年のワガママ, Sennen no Wagamama); Game 39: "I Want to Know How Strong You Are" (実力を知りたい, Jitsuryoku o Shiritai); Game 40: "Start" (始動, Shidō); Game 41: "The Go Club Is Heating Up!" (沸き立つ囲碁部, Wakitatsu Igobu); Game 42: "Resolutions" (それぞれの決断, Sorezore no Ketsudan); Game 43: "Yet Another Step Forward" (更なる一歩, Saranaru Ippo)
| 06 | The Insei Exam (院生試験, Insei Shiken) | April 4, 2000; 978-4-08-872849-0 | February 7, 2006; 978-1-4215-0275-5 |
Game 44: "The Insei Exam" (院生試験, Insei Shiken); Game 45: "Black Coffee" (ブラックコーヒー, Burakku Kōhī); Game 46: "Catalyst" (起爆剤, Kibakuzai); Game 47: "Yugen no Ma" (幽玄の間, Yūgen no Ma); Game 48: "Oza vs. Akira - Part 1" (王座vs.アキラ①, Ōza bāsasu Akira ①); Game 49: "Oza vs. Akira - Part 2" (王座vs.アキラ②, Ōza bāsasu Akira ②); Game 50: "Oza vs. Akira - Part 3" (王座vs.アキラ③, Ōza bāsasu Akira ③); Game 51: "A Place to Return" (時々もどりたい場所, Tokidoki Modoritai Basho); Special Bonus: "The Haze Middle School Actors present 'Assassination at Honnoji Temple'" (—葉瀬中アクターズ— 本能寺炎上, -Haze-chū Akutāzu- Honnō-ji Enjō)
| 07 | The Young Lions Tournament (若獅子戦, Wakajishisen) | June 2, 2000; 978-4-08-872873-5 | July 5, 2006; 978-1-4215-0641-8 |
Game 52: "Two Study Groups" (ふたつの研究会, Futatsu no Kenkyūkai); Game 53: "Cause for Concern" (気がかり, Kigakari); Game 54: "Tomorrow is Anyone's Game" (誰もが明日へ, Dare mo ga Asu e); Game 55: "Welcome to A League" (ようこそ1組へ, Yōkoso Hitokumi e); Game 56: "Sai's Student" (saiの弟子, Sai no Deshi); Game 57: "And Then..." (それから, Sore kara); Game 58: "The Young Lions Tournament" (若獅子戦, Wakajishisen); Game 59: "Toya Looks Back" (ふりむいた塔矢, Furimuita Tōya); Game 60: "The Pro Test Approaches!" (迫る！プロ試験, Semaru! Puro Shiken)
| 08 | The Pro Test Preliminaries: Day Four (プロ試験予選4日目 そして——, Puro Shiken Yosen Yokame Soshite——) | August 4, 2000; 978-4-08-872894-0 | November 7, 2006; 978-1-4215-0642-5 |
Game 61: "Kuwabara Hon'inbo" (桑原本因坊, Kuwabara Hon'inbō); Game 62: "A Chance to Play" (私が打っても？, Watashi ga Utte mo?); Game 63: "Look How Far I've Come" (ここまで来たぜ, Koko made Kita ze); Game 64: "Pro Test Prelims, Day One: The Man with the Beard" (プロ試験予選初日の男, Puro Shiken Yosen Shonichi no Otoko); Game 65: "Aim for Three Wins" (3勝をめざして, Sanshō o Mezashite); Game 66: "The Pro Test Preliminaries: Day Two" (プロ試験予選2日目, Puro Shiken Yosen Futsukame); Game 67: "The Pro Test Preliminaries: Day Three" (プロ試験予選3日目, Puro Shiken Yosen Mikkame); Game 68: "The Pro Test Preliminaries: Day Four... and Then..." (プロ試験予選4日目 そして——, Puro Shiken Yosen Yokame Soshite——); Game 69: "The Team" (チーム結成！, Chīmu Kessei!); Special Bonus: "The Haze Middle School Actors Present the Rehearsal of 'Assassination at Honnoji Temple'" (—葉瀬中アクターズ— 本能寺炎上[リハーサル], -Haze-chū Akutāzu- Honnō-ji Enjō [Rihāsaru])
| 09 | The Pro Test Begins (本戦開始, Honsen Kaishi) | October 4, 2000; 978-4-08-873022-6 | April 3, 2007; 978-1-4215-1066-8 |
Game 70: "Training Is Fun!!" (特訓！特訓‼, Tokkun! Tokkun‼); Game 71: "You Mustn't Beat Him" (勝ってはならない, Katte wa Naranai); Game 72: "A Four-way Challenge" (4人, Yonin); Game 73: "Sheer Luck" (完璧な偶然, Kanpeki na Gūzen); Game 74: "Suyong Hong" (洪(ホン) 秀英(スヨン), Hon Suyon); Game 75: "There Can Be Only One" (勝者は1人, Shōsha wa Hitori); Game 76: "My Name Is..." (オレの名は, Ore no Na wa); Game 77: "The Pro Test Begins" (本戦開始, Honsen Kaishi); Game 78: "Winning Streak" (連勝の波紋, Renshō no Hamon)
| 10 | Lifeline (起死回生, Kishi Kaisei) | December 4, 2000; 978-4-08-873047-9 | August 7, 2007; 978-1-4215-1067-5 |
Game 79: "Hikaru vs. Tsubaki" (ヒカルvs椿, Hikaru bāsasu Tsubaki); Game 80: "A Stand-in" (身代わり, Migawari); Game 81: "An Important Game" (慎重な一局, Shinchō na Ikkyoku); Game 82: "An Ill-Fated Moment" (魔の一瞬, Ma no Isshun); Game 83: "The Elusive Win" (色星の行方, Iroboshi no Yukue); Game 84: "Waya vs. Ochi" (和谷vs越智, Waya bāsasu Ochi); Game 85: "Lifeline" (起死回生, Kishi Kaisei); Game 86: "You Never Know" (予断許さず, Yodan Yurusazu); Game 87: "Who Played Black?" (この黒は誰？, Kono Kuro wa Dare?)
| 11 | Fierce Battle (激戦, Gekisen) | March 2, 2001; 978-4-08-873086-8 | January 1, 2008; 978-1-4215-1068-2 |
Game 88: "First to Make the Grade" (1一目の合格者, Hitorime no Gōkakusha); Game 89: "Together Always" (いつもいっしょ, Itsu mo Issho); Game 90: "Become One of Us" (プロへ来い！, Puro e Koi!); Game 91: "I Resign" (負けました); Game 92: "Beat Shindo!" (打倒進藤, Datō Shindō); Game 93: "The Final Match of the Pro Test" (プロ試験最終戦, Puro Shiken Saishūsen); Game 94: "A Fierce Battle" (激戦, Gekisen); Game 95: "The Second Player to Pass" (2人目の合格者, Futarime no Gōkakusha); Game 96: "Finally!" (やっと！, Yatto!)
| 12 | Sai's Day Out (新初段シリーズ, Shinshodan Shirīzu) | May 1, 2001; 978-4-08-873110-0 | May 6, 2008; 978-1-4215-1508-3 |
Game 97: "The Awaiting Pros" (待ちうけるプロ達, Machiukeru Puro-tachi); Game 98: "The Shinshodan Series" (新初段シリーズ, Shinshodan Shirīzu); Game 99: "I'll Play" (私が打つ, Watashi ga Utsu); Game 100: "Hikaru Takes His Time" (ヒカルの長考, Hikaru no Chōkō); Game 101: "A Game Most Transparent" (不透明な一局, Futōmei na Ikkyoku); Game 102: "Rematch" (再戦を期して, Saisen o Kishite); Game 103: "Forgery" (偽りの署名, Itsuwari no Shomei); Game 104: "Kurata 6-Dan" (倉田六段, Kurata Rokudan)
| 13 | First Professional Match (プロ第一戦, Puro Daiissen) | August 3, 2001; 978-4-08-873144-5 | October 7, 2008; 978-1-4215-1509-0 |
Game 105: "First Professional Match" (プロ第一戦, Puro Daiissen); Game 106: "Pressure" (プレッシャー, Puresshā); Game 107: "Confession" (告白, Kokuhaku); Game 108: "Alone Together in the Hospital Room" (2人きりの病室, Futari kiri Byōshitsu); Game 109: "Toya Koyo" (toya koyo, Tōya Kōyō); Game 110: "Mounting Excitement" (昂る心, Takaburu Kokoro); Game 111: "The Return of Sai" (sai再び, Sai Futatabi); Game 112: "Sai vs. Toya Koyo: Part I" (sai vs toya koyo①, Sai bāsasu Tōya Kōyō ①); Game 113: "Sai vs. Toya Koyo: Part II" (sai vs toya koyo②, Sai bāsasu Tōya Kōyō ②)
| 14 | Sai vs. Toya Koyo (sai vs toya koyo, Sai bāsasu Tōya Kōyō) | October 4, 2001; 978-4-08-873169-8 | February 3, 2009; 978-1-4215-1510-6 |
Game 114: "Sai vs. Toya Koyo: Part III" (sai vs toya koyo③, Sai bāsasu Tōya Kōyō ③); Game 115: "Sai vs. Toya Koyo: Part IV" (sai vs toya koyo④, Sai bāsasu Tōya Kōyō ④); Game 116: "One Thousand Years" (千年の答, Sennen no Kotoe); Game 117: "Discovered" (発覚, Hakkaku); Game 118: "Pursued" (追及, Tsuikyū); Game 119: "A Test of Strength" (力試し, Chikaradameshi); Game 120: "One-Color Go" (一色碁, Isshokugo); Game 121: "Toya Koyo Retires!" (塔矢行洋引退！, Tōya Kōyō Intai!); Bonus Story: "Your Treat, Waya!" (おごって♡和谷くん！, Ogotte ♡ Waya-kun!)
| 15 | Sayonara (さよなら) | December 24, 2001; 978-4-08-873215-2 | May 5, 2009; 978-1-4215-2192-3 |
Game 122: "Stupid Hikaru" (ヒカルのばかっ, Hikaru no Baka'); Game 123: "I Do Not Wish to Disappear!!!" (消えたくない!!!, Kietakunai!!!); Game 124: "Sayonara" (さよなら); Game 125: "Sai Disappears" (佐為が消えた？, Sai ga Kieta?); Game 126: "Searching for Sai" (佐為をたずねて, Sai o Tazunete); Game 127: "Hiroshima's Top Go Player" (広島最強棋士, Hiroshima Saikyō Kishi); Game 128: "The Last Clue" (最後の手がかり, Saigo no Tegakari); Game 129: "Come Back!" (もどって来い！, Modotte Koi!); Game 130: "I Will Stop Playing" (もう打たない, Mō Utanai)
| 16 | Chinese Go Association (中国棋院, Chūgoku Kiin) | March 4, 2002; 978-4-08-873232-9 | August 4, 2009; 978-1-4215-2584-6 |
Game 131: "Chinese Go Institute" (中国棋院, Chūgoku Kiin); Game 132: "Le Ping" (楽(レェ)平(ピン), Rē Pin); Game 133: "Isumi Tested" (試される伊角, Tamesareru Isumi); Game 134: "Yang Hai's Advice" (楊(ヤン)海(ハイ)の助(じょ)言(げん), Yan Hai no Jogen); Game 135: "Isumi vs. Le Ping" (伊(い)角(すみ)vs(バーサス)楽(レェ)平(ピン), Isumi bāsasu Rē Pin); Game 136: "Forfeit, Forfeit…" (不戦敗、不戦敗…, Fusenpai, Fusenpai…); Game 137: "The Final Tournament" (最後の大会, Saigo no Taikai); Game 138: "The Visitor" (訪問者, Hōmonsha); Game 139: "From This Game" (この一局から, Kono Ikkyoku kara)
| 17 | A Familiar Face (なつかしい笑顔, Natsukashii Egao) | June 4, 2002; 978-4-08-873268-8 | November 3, 2009; 978-1-4215-2585-3 |
Game 140: "Resolution" (決心, Kesshin); Game 141: "First Return Game" (復帰初戦, Fukki Shosen); Game 142: "The Sprinting Two" (走り出した2人, Hashiridashita Futari); Game 143: "Go World Rumblings" (碁界鳴動, Gokai Meidō); Game 144: "Finally This Day" (漸くこの日が, Yōyaku Kono Hi ga); Game 145: "Hikaru vs. Akira" (ヒカルvsアキラ, Hikaru bāsasu Akira); Game 146: "Hikaru's Go" (ヒカルの碁, Hikaru no Go); Game 147: "Only I Know" (ボクだけがわかる, Boku dake ga Wakaru); Game 148: "The Nostalgic Smile" (なつかしい笑顔, Natsukashii Egao)
| 18 | Six Characters, Six Stories (番外編, Bangaihen) | August 2, 2002; 978-4-08-873289-3 | February 2, 2010; 978-1-4215-2823-6 |
Sidestory 1: "Toya Akira" (塔矢アキラ, Tōya Akira); Sidestory 2: "Kaga Tetsuo" (加賀鉄男); Sidestory 3: "Nase Asumi" (奈瀬明日美); Sidestory 4: "Mitani Yuki" (三谷祐輝, Mitani Yūki); Sidestory 5: "Kurata Atsushi" (倉田厚); Sidestory 6: "Fujiwara no Sai" (藤原佐為)
| 19 | One Step Forward! (最強初段, Saikyō Shodan) | October 4, 2002; 978-4-08-873332-6 | May 4, 2010; 978-1-4215-2824-3 |
Game 149: The Strongest Beginner Dan Ever (最強初段, Saikyō Shodan); Game 150: A New Stage (新しい舞台, Atarashii Butai); Game 151: Me Too! (オレだって！, Ore Datte!); Game 152: The Opponent is 7-Dan (相手は七段, Aite wa Nanadan); Game 153: One Step Forward! (一歩前へ！, Ippo Mae e!); Game 154: The Arrival of Ueshima! (上島見参！, Ueshima Kenzan!); Game 155: The Two That Don't Come (来ない2人, Konai Futari); Game 156: Hikaru vs. Kadowaki (ヒカルvs門脇, Hikaru bāsasu Kadowaki)
| 20 | The Young Lions! (社vsヒカル, Yashiro bāsasu Hikaru) | January 6, 2003; 978-4-08-873365-4 | August 3, 2010; 978-1-4215-2825-0 |
Game 157: "Memories" (思い出, Omoide); Game 158: "First Hand, Tengen" (初手天元, Shote Tengen); Game 159: "Kansai Go Institute" (関西棋院, Kansai Kiin); Game 160: "A Moment's Timidness" (一瞬の気後れ, Isshun no Kiokure); Game 161: "The Young Lions" (若獅子達, Wakajishi-tachi); Game 162: "Graduation" (卒業式, Sotsugyōshiki); Game 163: "The Members Will Be...?" (メンバーは誰に？, Menbā wa Dare ni?); Game 164: "Yashiro vs. Hikaru" (社vsヒカル, Yashiro bāsasu Hikaru); Game 165: "Second Hand, Tengen" (2手目天元, Niteme Tengen)
| 21 | Great Expectations (北斗杯会場へ, Hokutohai Kaijō e) | April 4, 2003; 978-4-08-873408-8 | November 2, 2010; 978-1-4215-2826-7 |
Game 166: "Yashiro's Loss" (社 敗れる！, Yashiro Yabureru!); Game 167: "The Youngsters" (少年達, Shōnen-tachi); Game 168: "A Month Before The Hokuto Cup" (北斗杯 1か月前, Hokutohai Ikkagetsu Mae); Game 169: "The Burden Of Expectations" (期待を背に‼, Kitai o Se ni‼); Game 170: "The Korean Go Association" (韓国棋院, Kankoku Kiin); Game 171: "Proof Of Existence" (存在の証, Sonzai no Akashi); Game 172: "Toya's Home" (塔矢邸, Tōya-tei); Game 173: "First Board Is Toya" (大将は塔矢, Taishō wa Tōya); Game 174: "Hokuto Cup Gathering" (北斗杯会場へ, Hokutohai Kaijō e)
| 22 | China vs. Japan (打(だ)倒(とう)高(コ)永(ヨン)夏(ハ), Datō Ko Yonha) | June 4, 2003; 978-4-08-873432-3 | January 4, 2011; 978-1-4215-2827-4 |
Game 175: "Suyon And Yongha" (秀英(スヨン)と永夏(ヨンハ), Suyon to Yonha); Game 176: "Fighting Words" (挑発, Chōhatsu); Game 177: "Let Me Be First Board!" (オレを大将にして！, Ore o Taishō ni Shite!); Game 178: "China Vs Japan: part I" (中国vs日本①, Chūgoku bāsasu Nihon ①); Game 179: "China Vs Japan: part II" (中国vs日本②, Chūgoku bāsasu Nihon ②); Game 180: "China Vs Japan: part III" (中国vs日本③, Chūgoku bāsasu Nihon ③); Game 181: "China Vs Japan: part IV" (中国vs日本④, Chūgoku bāsasu Nihon ④); Game 182: "Defeat Ko Yongha" (打(だ)倒(とう)高(コ)永夏(ヨンハ), Datō Ko Yonha); Game 183: "Ko Yongha's Big Question" (永夏(ヨンハ)の問(と)い, Yonha no Toi)
| 23 | Endgame (あなたに呼びかけている, Anata ni Yobikakete Iru) | September 4, 2003; 978-4-08-873504-7 | May 3, 2011; 978-1-4215-2828-1 |
Game 184: "Japan Vs Korea: part I" (日本vs韓国①, Nihon bāsasu Kankoku ①); Game 185: "Japan Vs Korea: part II" (日本vs韓国②, Nihon bāsasu Kankoku ②); Game 186: "Japan Vs Korea: part III" (日本vs韓国③, Nihon bāsasu Kankoku ③); Game 187: "Japan Vs Korea: part IV" (日本vs韓国④, Nihon bāsasu Kankoku ④); Game 188: "End Game" (終局, Shūkyoku); Game 189: "I Call Out To You" (あなたに呼びかけている, Anata ni Yobikakete Iru); Extra Chapter 1: "Fujiwara no Sai Vs Toya Akira" (藤原佐為vs塔矢アキラ, Fujiwara no Sai bāsasu Tōya Akira); Extra Chapter 2: "Oka And Shoji" (庄司君っ！岡君っ！, Shōji-kun'! Oka-kun'!)
