= Sakon =

Sakon may refer to:

- Karakurizōshi Ayatsuri Sakon (Puppet Master Sakon), a 1999 manga and anime series
- Sakon (Naruto), a ninja from the Land of Sound in the manga and anime series Naruto
- Sakon, a character in the early 2000's video game The Legend of Zelda: Majora's Mask
- The left section of a Nunchaku

== People ==
- Shima Sakon (1540–1600), samurai living during the Azuchi-Momoyama Period of Feudal Japan
- Sakon Yamamoto (born 1982), Formula One driver

== See also ==
- Sakon Nakhon (disambiguation)
