= Ral Grad =

Japanese manga series

- First tankōbon volume cover, featuring Ral

BLUE DRAGON ラルΩグラド (Burū Doragon Raru Gurado)
- Genre: Adventure; Dark fantasy; Supernatural
- Manga
- Written by: Tsuneo Takano
- Illustrated by: Takeshi Obata
- Published by: Shueisha
- English publisher: NA: Viz Media
- Imprint: Jump Comics
- Magazine: Weekly Shōnen Jump
- Original run: December 4, 2006 – July 9, 2007
- Volumes: 4
- icon

Ral Ω Grad (Japanese: BLUE DRAGON ラルΩグラド, Hepburn: Burū Doragon Raru Gurado) (Note: The omega symbol in the title is not pronounced.) is a Japanese manga series written by Tsuneo Takano and illustrated by Takeshi Obata. It is loosely based on the Blue Dragon video game. The story revolves around the journey of a young man named Ral from the kingdom of Sphaelite. Ral has a symbiotic relationship with Grad, a legendary shadow with the form of a giant blue dragon. The series ran in Shueisha's shōnen manga magazine Weekly Shōnen Jump from December 2006 to July 2007, with its chapters collected in four tankōbon volumes. The series was licensed for English release in North America by Viz Media.

== Story ==
In a world where demonic creatures named shadows enter our realm through their very namesakes, little is safe. However, when a young boy by the name of Ral becomes friends with the shadow inside him, he may be the last hope in saving the world. Ral lives on the island of Sphaein, in the kingdom of Sphaelite (スフエライト, Suferaito). There, he has been enlisted to protect the kingdom from evil shadows that wish to destroy it. With the aid of his shadow, a large blue dragon named Grad, and his teacher, Mio, Ral can take on any challenger.

== Characters ==
Ral (ラル, Raru)
Ral is a 15-year-old boy bound to the shadow Grad. His mother dies shortly after his birth, and as an infant, he unnervingly speaks in full sentences before Grad—a massive blue dragon-shaped shadow—erupts from him, destroying his village and scorching the surrounding landscape. His father, Lord Roy, imprisons him in darkness for 15 years, believing shadows cannot manifest without light. During confinement, Ral befriends Grad and his tutor, Mio. When shadows attack the kingdom, Roy releases him upon Mio's assurance of his control. Ral swiftly summons Grad, defeating the horde. He shares Grad's abilities, including fire breath, draconic wings, and claws. Despite his childish demeanor, he is a skilled strategist. Obsessed with women, he introduces himself as "Ral the Breast Groper", though his motives stem from a genuine desire to protect them.
Grad (グラド, Gurado)
Grad is a Blue Dragon Shadow known as the Délire Monstre, feared for its Flamme Bleue. Seeking a way to defeat the Queen of Darkness, Bira—who invaded the human realm and corrupted his homeland, Le Noir—Grad bonds with the infant Ral, believing human intelligence superior to shadows. He grants Ral his power while allowing him near-total control, forming a symbiotic partnership. After their victory over Bira and the restoration of Le Noir, Grad returns to his world, with Ral accompanying him due to their fused existence. Though Grad typically defers to Ral, he occasionally intervenes when their shared mission demands it.
Mio (ミォ)
Mio, Ral's tutor from Sphaelite, employs unorthodox training methods to motivate him, including a "tit for tat" system where she permits breast-groping as mission rewards. Despite these unconventional techniques, the highly educated instructor maintains rigorous focus on developing Ral's shadow-control abilities and his role as a defender against supernatural threats.
Aia (アイア)
Aia is a 13-year-old host to a first-form shadow, sharing Ral's experience of being sealed away. Known for repeating phrases, she gains Ral's immediate acceptance due to her appearance, despite him never witnessing her shadow's abilities.
Quru Quru (クルクル, Kuru Kuru)
Aia's shadow partner, Quru Quru possesses chameleon-like attributes, capable of silently extending its form up to sixty "makil" while detecting sounds within a thirty-makil radius. According to Aia, the shadow exhibits particular responsiveness when she manipulates its tongue.
Kafka (カフカ, Kafuka)
Kafka, titled "Chaîne Lord" (シェンネロド, "Shenne Rodo"), is a chivalrous knight of Stola Castle known as "Kafka of the Chain of Roses". She duels Ral to protect her queen's honor after he attempts to grope her, with the duel's terms granting the winner access to her chest. Despite their initial conflict, she later joins Ral's group. She suffers from severe seasickness.
Riz (リズ, Rizu)
Riz is a Chaîne Lord Shadow and partner to Kafka, possessing formidable defensive capabilities through its thorned roots which can strangle enemies. After absorbing Buffle, the Water Beast, it gains additional offensive power—manifesting blades of water to attack opponents.
Sunsu (スンス)
Sunsu is a youth from Lulira who harbors hatred for Ganette after his sister was taken by shadows and Ganette failed to intervene. After an unsuccessful confrontation with Ganette, he seeks to bond with a shadow to prove himself. When Kafka refuses to train him without one, he ventures beyond Lulira's walls and returns the next day having bonded with Gensui, a shadow.
Gensui (ゲンスイ)
Gensui is Sunsu's shadow, a small insectoid creature that grants its host underwater breathing capabilities when floating on water's surface. The shadow possesses exceptional water-skipping mobility. It grows stronger by consuming shadows defeated by Ganette, following Ral's encouragement. Through this process, it develops venomous fangs after assimilating a cobra shadow's traits, along with other enhanced abilities.
Ganette (ガネット, Ganetto)
Ganette is a proficient but relaxed swordsman who travels with two companions: Leela, who possesses the bat-like shadow Blatz, and Senole, bonded with the feline shadow Meesh. Demonstrating exceptional combat ability, he can eliminate shadows through physical force alone. His speech occasionally incorporates Spanish phrases, uttering "Adios" and "Tardes" during battles.
Gaira (ガイラ)
Gaira is Ganette's shadow, one of only five capable of existing in the "friends" form. Manifesting as a massive white tiger, it chose Ganette as its host due to his swordsmanship prowess, intending to use his strength against Bira to return to Nior. The shadow maintains a conditional alliance, prepared to consume Ganette should he weaken.
Yaya (ヤヤ)
Yaya is a young girl emotionally suppressed by Cory under Lady Bira's command. Implanted with a phoenix shadow in childhood to mature for Bira's purposes, she guards female prisoners while in this controlled state. Her apparent emotionlessness stems from external manipulation—when Cory's influence lapses during his regeneration, she reverts to her true fearful personality. This reveals her natural state as a frightened child rather than the emotionless guardian she typically presents.
Cory (コリー, Korī)
Cory is Yaya's phoenix shadow and one of the five special-class "friends form" shadows. Implanted by Lady Bira, this immortal entity survives even in the human world, demonstrating sufficient power to restrain both Grad (dragon) and Gaira (tiger) through its healing blood and formidable wings. During its confrontation with Ral, Cory acknowledges defeat upon witnessing Ral's display of genuine human compassion, marking a rare moment of concession for the otherwise indomitable shadow.
Lady Bira (ビラ様, Bira-sama)
Lady Bira, the Queen of Darkness (闇女王, Yami Joō), also known as (Opsquria (オプスキュリア, Opusukyuria)), rules the shadows from Jugil Castle in Kabil. As one of the five prime shadows, she possesses the exclusive ability to create new shadows. Her obsession with beauty drives her to collect attractive women, draining their soul orbs and leaving them disabled. Shadows in her court seek her bodily substances to gain power. After producing an heir with her favored male shadow, she intends to eradicate humanity. Her most feared technique, the Eye of Sorrow, instantly annihilates lesser shadows—though it proved ineffective against Grad after fusing with Ral, leading to her defeat by Flamme Bleue.
Malero (マレロ, Marero)
Malero is a host to a first-form shadow who, like Ral, endured imprisonment. After witnessing his combat abilities, Ral entrusts him with guarding the castle in his absence.
Golbago (ゴルバゴ, Gorubago)
Malero's shadow partner is determined to eliminate Queen Opsquria to facilitate its return to Noir, the shadow world. The shadow openly declares its willingness to employ any means necessary to achieve this goal.
Lord Roy (ロイ, Roi)
Lord Roy, Ral's father and a knight-lord, imprisoned his son in darkness to contain the dormant shadow within him. He later authorized Ral's release, only to be immediately attacked—an act Ral and Grad had premeditated during their confinement.

== Publication ==
Written by Tsuneo Takano and illustrated by Takeshi Obata, Ral Ω Grad ran in Shueisha's shōnen manga magazine Weekly Shōnen Jump from December 4, 2006, to July 9, 2007. (Note: It finished in the magazine's #32 issue of 2007 (cover date July 23), released on July 9.) Shueisha collected its 29 individual chapters into four tankōbon volumes, released from April 4 to November 2, 2007.

In North America, the series was licensed for English release by Viz Media. The four volumes were released from February 5, 2008, to June 2, 2009.

In Germany, Tokyopop began publication in October 2007 under the title Blue Dragon RalΩGrad, a spelling mandated by the licensing contract with Shueisha.

=== Volumes ===
| No. | Original release date | Original ISBN | English release date | English ISBN |
|---|---|---|---|---|
| 1 | April 4, 2007 | 978-4-08-874376-9 | February 5, 2008 | 978-1-4215-1890-9 |
| 2 | July 4, 2007 | 978-4-08-874388-2 | October 7, 2008 | 978-1-4215-1957-9 |
| 3 | September 4, 2007 | 978-4-08-874416-2 | February 3, 2009 | 978-1-4215-2215-9 |
| 4 | November 2, 2007 | 978-4-08-874437-7 | June 2, 2009 | 978-1-4215-2589-1 |

== Reception ==
Dominic Nguyen of Newtype USA wrote: "What readers will appreciate most about Ral Ω Grad is the supporting cast, which largely consists of attractive young girls."
