= Show-ha Shoten! =

Japanese manga series

- First tankōbon volume cover, featuring Azemichi Shijima (left) and Taiyo Higashikata (right)

ショーハショーテン！ (Shō-ha Shōten!)
- Genre: Owarai; Slice of life
- Manga
- Written by: Akinari Asakura
- Illustrated by: Takeshi Obata
- Published by: Shueisha
- English publisher: NA: Viz Media
- Imprint: Jump Comics SQ.
- Magazine: Jump Square
- Original run: October 4, 2021 – August 4, 2025
- Volumes: 11
- icon

Show-ha Shoten! (Japanese: ショーハショーテン！, Hepburn: Shō-ha Shōten! (Note: In early chapters and promotional material, the title was officially romanized as "SHOW-HA SYO-TEN!".)) is a Japanese manga series written by Akinari Asakura and illustrated by Takeshi Obata. It follows high school students Azemichi Shijima and Taiyo Higashikata as they aim to become the best comedy duo in Japan. Show-ha Shoten! was serialized monthly in Shueisha's Jump Square magazine from October 2021 to August 2025, with the chapters collected into eleven tankōbon volumes as of September 2025. Viz Media has licensed the series for English release in North America.

== Plot ==
Shy high school student Azemichi Shijima and former child actor Taiyo Higashikata both love comedy. After learning that Azemichi is a skilled joke writer famed for regular contributions to a radio show under the pen name Everyday Shijimi, Taiyo tricks him into being his partner in a sketch comedy routine for their school's cultural festival. The sketch is a hit, with the two winning the award for best performance. Realizing that each excels in the area where the other is weak, Azemichi with writing comedy and when to transition and Taiyo with performing and ad-libbing, the two decide to team up and form the comedy duo One-Way Ticket to the Top (天頂片道切符). In order to earn the blessing of Azemichi's parents, they must win the bimonthly High School Comedy Battle. There, they meet and become rivals to the duo Sprechchor and come in second place behind Rising. However, Rising resigns so that One-Way Ticket to the Top are elevated to first place and can continue comedy. Azemichi and Taiyo then enter the Kanto-2 block preliminary round of Wara-1 Koshien, or "Wara-Ko" for short, a national manzai competition for high school students.

== Characters ==
=== One-Way Ticket to the Top ===
Azemichi Shijima (四十万 畦道, Shijima Azemichi)
A shy 16-year-old high school student who is obsessed with comedy ever since he failed to make his middle school crush, Mizuha, laugh at her request two years ago. She soon changed her last name and moved away. Not knowing her new name, Azemichi hopes he might be able to see her again if he becomes famous. He has already achieved some success by submitting jokes to TV and radio shows under the name "Everyday Shijimi", but that was anonymously because he has stage fright.
Taiyo Higashikata (東片 太陽, Higashikata Taiyō)
Azemichi's schoolmate and a former famous child actor in historical dramas. Although a natural, he only acted to make his mother smile, and switched to comedy after seeing someone make her laugh at a joke. He was in a previous comedy duo, but his partner Sakutaro Kunugi died from a disease. Carrying on his former partner's dream, he wants to become the first person to win both the Wara-1 Grand Prix, (Note: This competition is modeled on the M-1 Grand Prix.) a competition for manzai duos, and the Ultimate Comedy Battle, a sketch comedy competition.
Akane Hanamori (花守 茜, Hanamori Akane)
Azemichi and Taiyo's senpai who has been a big fan of comedy since she was a child. She is One-Way Ticket to the Top's biggest fan and trains them in manzai, while becoming something of a manager to them.

=== Other groups ===
2022 Wara-1 Koshien finalists [spoilers]
Block	Team	Routine	Order	Place (pts) (Note: There are six judges in the final: Kei Arashiyama [Yamato Gunkei], Ryoji Kishibe [Don the Kid], Honpo Yatsugawa [Grande], Professor Hiyama [Cassia Flask], Midori Hamakaze [Hamakaze Miyuki-Midori], and Wahha Hanai [president of the Kansai Manzai Association]. This means the maximum score is 600 points. The scores given by each judge are presented in this order.)
Hokkaido / Tohoku	Passionate Sandbag	"Mid-level Delinquent" (Note: In "Mid-level Delinquent", Haruka plays a delinquent whose mild crimes eventually land him in trouble with the local tax office. Matsuri's cutting commentary is interleaved with Haruka's unlikely crew, culminating in an intractable scheduling issue.)	10	8 (530) (Note: Scored 93-89-90-81-91-86)
Kanto-1	Rising	"Zombies" (Note: In "Zombies", Atsushi and Bunta both take turns playing as the obtuse boke while planning how to survive a zombie apocalypse by sheltering in a grocery market. The routine is layered with rapid-fire jokes fired off while trying to upstage each other, executed in an appealing manner.)	7	2 (572) (Note: Scored 98-98-98-93-93-92)
Kanto-2	One-Way Ticket to the Top	"Our Story" (Note: In "Our Story", Azemichi recounts his regret over staying silent during his farewell to Mizuha while Taiyo offers unrealistic advice and illustrative school scenes through contemporary dance. At the climax, Taiyo reveals that he intends to dance as an assist for Azemichi's words, repeating the scenes, bringing a crashing wave of laughter.)	9	1 (580) (Note: Scored 99-98-98-94-96-95)
Chubu	Brutus	"Rich Kid" (Note: In "Rich Kid", Nazutani plays an obnoxiously rich kid who bribes his way out of trouble, and Nitta reacts with predictable outrage; the rich kid's story unravels. It is a dense, complicated routine executed flawlessly after many hours of practice.)	4	6 (564) (Note: Scored 96-95-96-86-96-95)
Kansai-1	Shiba Inu World Tour	"Reunion" (Note: In "Reunion", Yo evaluates Shunsei's preparations for an upcoming business seminar reunion with explosive, cutting comments. Shunsei brings unexpected skills and gifts to the reunion, confounding Yo, whose awkwardness contrasts with Shunsei's smooth delivery.)	8	4T (566) (Note: Scored 97-95-97-90-93-94)
Kansai-2	Kamikaze Yellowtail	"Pro Swimming" (Note: In "Pro Swimming", Kazami professes his love of swimming competitions while Kamiyama merely nods enthusiastically; when an exasperated Kazami asks him to say something instead of just nodding, Kamiyama reveals just how much he loves swimming.)	2	9 (523) (Note: Scored 90-88-90-82-86-87)
Chugoku / Shikoku	Iwashi Tsuyoshi	"Spherical World" (Note: In "Spherical World", intense Mochizuki declares he will solve all the world's problems by pressing a button and turning every person into an equal, perfect sphere; skeptical Atago keeps poking holes in his absurd proposal.)	3	7 (531) (Note: Scored 95-90-92-85-88-81)
Kyushu / Okinawa	Broken Glass Slipper	"School Crossing Duty" (Note: In "School Crossing Duty", Himawari's fear of being a parent stems from having to serve as a crossing guard; Rinka scoffs at what is normally light work and Himawari portrays several students to test her mettle. Each student is more outrageous than the last, starting with an innocent but talkative kid and ending with Oratorio Tanaka, a psychic hero persecuted for his visions.)	1	4T (566) (Note: Scored 97-96-98-87-93-95)
Wild Card	Sprechchor (Kanto-2)	"Babysitters" (Note: In "Babysitters", Jun and Tetta compare notes on activities suitable for young relatives; their signature move is to reverse roles, having Tetta ask pointed questions and making Jun's previously reasonable answers seem quite suspicious.)	6	3 (569) (Note: Scored 96-95-97-88-95-98)
Wild Card	Mega Beef Bowl XL (Chugoku / Shikoku)	"Dating" (Note: In "Dating", the three boys share tips on dating, starting and ending their set in a human pyramid, which puts one of them out of microphone range.)	5	10 (499) (Note: Scored 87-84-90-80-81-77)

Sprechchor (シュプレヒコール, Shupurehikōru)
A high school comedy duo whose name is derived from "a chorus of voices". It is composed of Teppeita "Tetta" Onizaki (鬼崎 鉄平太, Onizaki Teppeita; てっ太 Tetta), a scary-looking man who is actually sensitive and caring, and Jun Mizushina (水科 潤, Mizushina Jun), a self-confessed "prick". Although Tetta is a talented baseball player, he was bullied regularly as a first-year, and Jun found a way to let him quit the team and partner with him. As three-time finalists of Wara-1 Koshien, and with the most appearances at the High School Comedy Battle, they are the "most visible" high school manzai duo. They form a friendly rivalry with One-Way Ticket to the Top after meeting at the High School Comedy Battle. Having placed second in the Kanto-2 regional, they are selected as one of two wild card teams to participate in the 2022 Wara-1 Koshien.
Rising (ライジン, Raijin)
A cocky, new comedy duo who beat One-Way Ticket to the Top at the High School Comedy Battle, their first competition; they are Atsushi Ban (伴熱志, Ban Atsushi) and Bunta Harigane (針金文太, Harigane Bunta). However, they resign so that One-Way Ticket to the Top win and Azemichi's parents can not force them to give up comedy. As the winner of the Kanto-1 regional, they are competing in the Wara-1 Koshien tournament.
Brutus (ぶるーたす, Burūtasu)
Brutus includes Tsutomu Nitta (新田 勉, Nitta Tsutomu) and Ryuki Nazutani (泥谷 琉希, Nazutani Ryūki), who is often seen eating, causing him to be overweight. As the winner of the Chubu regional, they are part of the Wara-1 Koshien tournament. Nazutani previously was in the duo Selinentius (せりぬんてぃうす, Serinunteiusu) with Sakutaro Kunugi (椚朔 太郎, Kunugi Sakutarō), but Kunugi left to team up with Taiyo, so Nazutani holds a grudge against Taiyo for "stealing" his partner.
Kirameki Confections (きらめき製菓, Kirameki Seika)
A comedy duo composed of Daiboku Tabata (田端大木, Tabata Daiboku), a very muscular man, and Suzume Kanade (奏すずめ, Kanade Suzume), a small female karateka. Their comedy is atypical in manzai in that it revolves around physical slapstick where Kanade strikes Tabata.
Broken Glass Slipper (ガラスの靴が割れた, Garasunokutsu ga Wareta)
Winners of the Kyushi / Okinawa regional. Unlike the other contestants, glasses-wearing Rinka Iwashimizu (石清水 凛香, Iwashimizu Rinka) and silly Himawari Saeda (小枝 ひまわり, Saeda Himawari) have competed in the actual Wara-1 Grand Prix, reaching the third round; they are known as the top female comedians, pro or amateur. They met in high school, serving detention together as Himawari's provocation caused Rinka to lose her temper multiple times, disrupting their classes. Himawari's older brother and sister exceled in academics and athletics, so to stand out, she is the class clown; when their teacher Miss Miyuki yells at Himawari for not taking anything seriously and trying to ruin Rinka's life, Rinka defends her and vows to show the world how funny they can be together.
Kamikaze Yellowtail (神風出世魚, Kamikaze Shusseuo)
Winners of the Kansai-2 regional. Daisuke Kazami (風見 大助, Kazami Daisuke) and Kosaku Kamiyama (神山 宏作, Kamiyama Kōsaku) are a "mismatched" pair, Kazami delivering lines smoothly and Kamiyama slowly and awkwardly.
Iwashi Tsuyoshi (いわしつよし, Iwashi Tsuyoshi)
Winners of the Chugoku / Shikoku regional. Yushin Mochizuki (望月 優心, Mochizuki Yūshin) and Kanji Atago (阿多古 寛治, Atago Kanji) are two friends who hold a deep-seated grudge against Passionate Sandbag because they insulted and sabotaged Sweet Potato Combo at the prior year's Wara-ko finals. Oshino, their friend and coworker, was part of Sweet Potato Combo and joined the priesthood after graduation.
Mega Beef Bowl XL (特盛牛丼大盛り, Tokumori Gyūdon Ōmori)
Selected as one of two wild cards; competed in the Chugoku / Shikoku regional. Unlike the other groups, there are three members: Ichinosuke Koda (幸田 市之助, Kōda Ichinosuke), Takumi Nomo (野茂 匠, Nomo Takumi), and Takuya Tone (利根 拓哉, Tone Takuya).
Shiba Inu World Tour (柴犬世界一周, Shiba Inu Sekai Isshū)
Winners of the Kansai-1 regional in an upset over Pascal 800, which placed 4th at the prior year's Wara-1 Koshien. Shunsei Mimomi (実籾春静, Mimomi Shunsei) and Yo Onozuka (小埜塚曜, Onozuka Yō) are mismatched partners: while Shunsei smoothly delivers his lines, Yo speaks in awkward, explosive phrases, giving them a unique rhythm.
Passionate Sandbag (絶唱サンドバッグ, Zesshō Sandobaggu)
Winners of the Hokkaido / Tohoku regional; they placed second in Wara-Ko their first year, and won in their second year. Matsuri Okanda (大神田 祭, Okanda Matsuri) and Haruka Ataru (中 悠, Ataru Haruka) have a mean-spirited comedy style, ridiculing their competitors with bullying observations, and as a result, are not well liked by other comedy teams.

== Publication ==
Written by Akinari Asakura and illustrated by Takeshi Obata, Show-ha Shoten! was serialized Shueisha's Jump Square's from October 4, 2021, to August 4, 2025. Shueisha is collecting the individual chapters into tankōbon volumes, with the first released on January 4, 2022.

Both Shueisha and Viz Media are releasing the series in English simultaneously as it is published in Japan, the former on its Manga Plus website and application. In June 2022, Viz Media announced that it would begin releasing volumes in print. The first volume was released on February 7, 2023.

=== Volumes ===
No.	Original release date	Original ISBN	English release date	English ISBN
1	January 4, 2022	978-4-08-882890-9	February 7, 2023	978-1-9747-3682-9
1. "Comedy and Courage" (笑いと覚悟); 2. "Comedy and Range" (笑いと射程); 3. "Comedy and Announcing Defeat" (笑いと敗北宣言)
After his middle school classmate Mizuha Yamamoto, who is moving to Tohoku, asks him to say something funny to send her off, Azemichi Shijima is flustered and remains mute, motivating him to hone his comedy instincts by secretly and regularly contributing to the TV and radio show "Ohgiri Dynamics" under the nom de plume "Everyday Shijimi" for two years, since his family expects him to go to college. Despite lacking a routine and partner, his classmate, former child actor Taiyo Higashikata, is aiming to win both the Wara-1 Grand Prix and the Ultimate Comedy Battle; an accident unmasks Azemichi as Everyday Shijimi and Taiyo proposes they join forces: his skill at performance will mesh with Azemichi's writing and offset his stage fright. Both are motivated by regrets and memories; Taiyo gently coerces him into partnership less than an hour before their debut performance at the school's culture festival. Azemichi outlines a simple skit that requires him to repeat only one line, and Taiyo's ad-libbing using Azemichi's pacing earns the greatest laughter of the day. (Note: In "The Conflicted Teacher", a group of students (represented by Azemichi) have earned a spot in a championship competition, but their teacher (Taiyo) has eagerly agreed to a date on the same day. The teacher keeps trying to dissuade the students from competing, going so far to plant cigarettes on the protesting student; the scheduling conflict is resolved when the competition date is delayed.) After Taiyo visits the Shijima family, they confess their love of comedy and prove their talents one week later by making the rest of the family laugh, one by one, using targeted jokes. However, before Mr. Shijima grants his full blessing, he says they must win an upcoming local comedy battle for high school students. At the registration desk, their classmate Akane Hanamori breaks the unwelcome news they will be competing with Sprechchor, a team who reached the finals at last year's Wara-1 Koshien, a spinoff of the Wara-1 for high school students. Teppeita Onizaki, one half of Sprechchor, suggests Hanamori should adjust the order to give Azemichi and Taiyo an advantage by going last; as they watch the other acts bomb after Sprechchor, Azemichi realizes they must overcome the crowd's inherent skepticism of strangers and desperately starts writing a new sketch. Cover: One-Way Ticket to the Top (Azemichi Shijima and Taiyo Higashikata)
2	May 2, 2022	978-4-08-883111-4	May 2, 2023	978-1-9747-3695-9
4. "Comedy and the Dam" (笑いとダム); 5. "Comedy and Tears" (笑いと涙); 6. "Comedy and Manzai" (笑いと漫才); 7. "Manzai and Scoping Out the Place" (漫才と会場入り)
Taiyo and Azemichi choose the team name "One-Way Ticket to the Top" (OWTT) by selecting a character from each member's name. Azemichi's skit combines a simple premise and serious approach, relying on his naivete and Taiyo's extemporaneous skills. (Note: In "Petting Zoo", Azemichi is a visitor trying to feed the animals (played by Taiyo) in a petting zoo; the animals keep biting him on the arm instead, and when he protests to the yakuza operators of the zoo, the mobster (Taiyo) bites him.) Sprechchor places third and OWTT's elation is short-lived, as a different group (Rising) wins; upon learning that OWTT would be disbanded without a win, Rising abdicates. In a flashback, Taiyo's motivation is explained: going back to his time as a child actor, he only wanted to make his irritable mother smile. Sprechchor visit the Shijimas to ensure that OWTT can continue and Hanamori gives them a goal to develop their voices and strengthen their delivery by distributing 100 enrollment forms during four open house days at the school. As a warm-up, they perform another skit at the end-of-year ceremony. (Note: In "Eco Bags", Taiyo worries about being stereotyped as a teenage boy who does not care enough about the environment to carry around reusable shopping bags, scheming up absurd ways to demonstrate his sincerity which are shot down repeatedly by an exasperated Azemichi.) After a long summer of practice, OWTT travel to Anion Mall (Note: Based on Aeon (company) shopping malls) in Mihama-ku, Chiba to compete in the Kanto-2 block; to qualify for the final competition of the Wara-1 Koshien, there are eight regional tournaments in the preliminary round, each with twenty teams; the winner of each region and two additional wild card teams will advance to the finals at the Nanba Royal Fugetsu Theater in Osaka. (Note: Based on appearance and name, this is a fictionalized Namba Grand Kagetsu Theater.) Ryuki Nazutani, who is part of the group Brutus, shows up to the preliminary round in Chiba to warn Azemichi that Taiyo may betray him. Hanamori submitted their application at the last minute, putting them in the favored closer's spot, but after Kirameki Confections, delighting Nazutani and Sprechchor. Cover: Sprechchor (Jun Mizushina and Teppeita Onizaki)
3	October 4, 2022	978-4-08-883233-3	August 8, 2023	978-1-9747-3898-4
8. "Manzai and Style" (漫才とスタイル); 9. "Manzai and Number One" (漫才と1番); 10. "Manzai and Sketch List" (漫才とネタ順); 11. "Manzai and Density" (漫才と密度)
The contestants are excited to meet the preliminary round's hosts and judges, famed comedy duo Yamato Gunkei. When Sprechchor goes on, they win the biggest laughs, (Note: In "Forgiveness", Tetta begs for forgiveness, as his intimidating appearance implies criminal activity, but his sins are surprisingly virtuous. Meanwhile, Jun describes his comparatively benign actions. They pull a surprise role reversal to finish, as Tetta berates Jun for numerous logical inconsistencies.) fulfilling expectations as the high school manzai pair with the most exposure thanks to their prior appearances and success. When Kirameki Confections ("The Stage Crushers") go on next, their routine is funny but strange, (Note: "Travel Destinations" relies on physical slapstick: musclebound Tabata teases easily infuriated karateka Kanade by suggesting domestic destinations instead of international tourist trips; she strikes him with increasingly aggressive punches until he collapses. Their routine, designed to amuse a hospitalized classmate, has not changed in three years.) poisoning the mood for the successive acts; only OWTT is left to compete. As they have been watching the other routines, OWTT run through their options, choosing their 16th routine as it offers the biggest twist. (Note: In "Musicals", Taiyo starts the routine by ignoring Azemichi in favor of performing a pastiche of scenes from "Shamza's Love and Glory", a fictional musical theater production. It has a long setup but rapid-fire jokes in the last half, as Azemichi shows his exasperation during Taiyo's painstaking explanations.) Their performance is building to a climax when Azemichi freezes, abruptly forgetting his lines. Cover: Kirameki Confections (Kanade Suzume and Tabata Daiboku)
4	February 3, 2023	978-4-08-883376-7	January 16, 2024	978-1-9747-4295-0
12. "Manzai and Judging" (漫才と審査); 13. "Comedy and Beginnings" (笑いと始まり); 14. "Comedy and Strain" (笑いと歪み); 15. "Comedy and Partners" (漫才と相方)
Taiyo gracefully saves the routine, cutting the last few lines short to stay on time. Although they earn the same composite score as Sprechchor, OWTT is given the edge and are named the winner. (Note: In the preliminary round, the teams earn the sum of four individual judges' score, each assigning up to 100 points, so the maximum score is 400 points. Sprechchor (92-93-89-90) and OWTT (95-96-89-84) each earned 364 points. OWTT were marked down for their mistake, but the hosts/judges Yamato Gunkei gave OWTT higher scores.) Yamato Gunkei warn OWTT that Rising are stronger even though OWTT are funnier. Sprechchor are disappointed but congratulate OWTT on their win. With three weeks until the final, Taiyo finally explains his history with Nazutani and Kunugi to Azemichi before introducing him to his mother. She acts disinterested and when Taiyo leaves Azemichi alone with her briefly, she asks if she is a toxic mother, believing Taiyo hates her. Azemichi assures her that Taiyo really loves her and only wants to make her smile. In a flashback, Taiyo met Sakutaro Kunugi when Kunugi's friend Chiyuri literally fell into his arms while Taiyo was waiting to meet his mom; Taiyo is inspired to pursue comedy after Kunugi coaxes a rare laugh out of his mother, asking for his tutelage after watching him perform with Nazutani in Selinentius. Kunugi practices diligently to achieve his goals, while Nazutani habitually misses their meetings; after rushing over to give Nazutani medicine, Kunugi suffers an acute asthma attack and collapses. Nazutani's continued indifference and Taiyo's infectious enthusiasm lead to Kunugi dropping Nazutani for Taiyo. To prepare for their final performance as Selinentius, Nazutani pushes Kunugi to practice harder than before, and Kunugi is hospitalized after one practice session in a downpour, coughing up blood and passing out; he never is discharged and dies. At the funeral, Nazutani is blamed for his death. Returning to the present, as a tune-up, OWTT enter the "Hiyama Cup" event, hosted by the comedian philosopher Professor Hiyama of the duo Cassia Flask, where they meet Shiba Inu World Tour and Broken Glass Slipper. Cover: Selinenius (Sakutaro Kunugi and Ryuki Nazutani)
5	July 4, 2023	978-4-08-883569-3	June 18, 2024	978-1-9747-4591-3
16. "Manzai and Skirmish" (漫才と前哨戦); 17. "Manzai and Hammer" (漫才と叩く); 18. "Comedy and Attitude" (笑いとスタンス); 19. "Comedy and Ohgiri" (笑いと大喜利)
Professor Hiyama gives the contestants effusive praise and he asks that when they are not performing, the teams watch the other routines. OWTT draws the opening slot and select a skit with the fastest "hook". (Note: In "Avoid Full Train", Taiyo plays a passenger exasperated by train crowding who proposes a new train service with draconian punishments to discourage ridership; as a passenger with "inappropriate ideas", Azemichi would be executed.) Shiba Inu World Tour benefit from their position (going sixth, after the crowd has warmed up) and win generous laughs. (Note: In "Don't Be Rude", Shunsei is afraid of being rude when visiting an old teacher and asks Yo to critique him. The routine was disjointed partially because Shunsei was trying to figure out which jokes landed the best.) Broken Glass Slipper (BGS) go ninth and their polished skit gives them the win; (Note: In "Dream for the Future", Himawari has a hard time choosing between her three dream careers, while Rinka tries to convince her using common sense that only one choice avoids a life of crime.) Shiba Inu place third. Hiyama congratulates OWTT for working through the leadoff spot and suggests that "Musicals" may have worked better. In their flashback, BGS struggles with an agency that refuses to consider signing them for their lack of experience and rampant sexism; one sympathetic manager suggests that if they win Wara-Ko, BGS will not need to undergo extra company training. At the after party, Rinka advises OWTT to pick two routines and practice them thoroughly. When OWTT reveal they will be in a pre-final televised competition with Passionate Sandbag and Rising, Rinka abruptly demands that OWTT crush Sandbag, whose bullying style of humor insults their competitors. At the event, Azemichi suffers from overwhelming stage fright. The hosts, Don the Kid and Kishibe, are a famed manzai pair; as an introduction, Passionate Sandbag live down to their reputation, ridiculing the appearance of OWTT and Rising, then joking about Azemichi's crush on Mizuha. In the show's competitive segment, one partner from each team is selected to write punchlines for joke prompts, and Azemichi vows to beat Okanda but he scores no points before the commercial break. Kishibe recognizes the sophisticated writing of Everyday Shijimi and gives Azemichi sage advice, wishing him well and calling Okanada a smug bully; by the end of the show, they finish in a three-way tie. Cover: Broken Glass Slipper (Rinka Iwashimizu and Himawari Saeda)
6	December 4, 2023	978-4-08-883723-9	December 17, 2024	978-1-9747-4975-1
20. "Manzai and Drawing" (漫才と抽選会); 21. "Manzai and Warm-Up" (漫才と前説); 22. "Manzai and Common Sense" (漫才と常識); 23. "Manzai and Scoring" (漫才と得点)
In Osaka, the ten teams are introduced and draw their performance order; BGS take the opening spot, while Passionate Sandbag are the closers. In between are Brutus, who have an unpleasant surprise planned for all the teams to follow them, going fourth; Sprechchor sixth, Rising seventh, Shiba Inu eighth, and OWTT ninth. Considering their two scripts, Azemichi decides to rewrite one for their performance tomorrow. Tetta warns both Taiyo and Azemichi about Nazutani's sabotage, adding to Azemichi that Taiyo may be thinking of throwing the competition; when Azemichi asks Taiyo about it, he claims it will be fine. Like the preliminary round, each team will be judged by a panel of comics. To warm up the crowd, professional manzai duo Emelario go on before BGS. (Note: Emelario are famous within Kansai but almost unknown outside the region. Their warm-up routine asks for audience applause by calling out various regions around Japan; one of the comics shows his frustration by rending his clothes after he senses a lack of enthusiasm.) BGS earn a raucous response, scoring 566 points and setting a strong example for the following teams. Cover: Rising (Atsushi Ban and Bunta Harigane)
7	April 4, 2024	978-4-08-883893-9	March 18, 2025	978-1-9747-5275-1
24. "Manzai and Goals" (漫才と目的); 25. "Manzai and What Needs to Be Said" (漫才と伝えるべきこと); 26. "Manzai and Light" (漫才と光); 27. "Manzai and Inversion" (漫才と反転)
Kamikaze Yellowtail's routine has a long setup and ultimately is not as successful as BGS, scoring 523. Ichinosuke Koda (Mega Beef Bowl XL) passes a note from Mochizuki (Iwashi Tsuyoshi) to Azemichi which berates him for failing to crush Passionate Sandbag, as they hold a grudge against last year's winners for their conduct during the prior Wara-ko finals. Azemichi stubbornly insists he trusts Taiyo, and Taiyo apologizes, saying he will ask Nazutani not to sabotage the tournament, preferring that all teams do their best, which may endanger their standing as Brutus are funny. Iwashi Tsuyoshi take the stage next with a routine lightly disguised to insult Sandbag; the abstract skit confuses some judges and they score 531. Taiyo returns Nazutani's handkerchief, reminding him that he was as instrumental as getting Taiyo into comedy as Kunugi. After Kunugi died, Nazutani transferred to a new school where he met Nitta, who insisted on becoming his partner in spite of Nazutani's reluctance and self-loathing. Before agreeing, Nazutani sets a condition that they will play the heel, emphasizing their strengths. Nazutani tells Nitta the only thing he can't laugh at is someone coughing up blood and still blames himself for killing Kunugi, even though Kunugi said he had cancer in a private letter and at the funeral, Chiyuri told him that Nazutani was not responsible for Kunugi's death. Just before they go on, Nazutani tells Nitta he is scrapping the sabotage and will try to win by skill instead; their routine sets up Nazutani as a heel with doubtful claims. Backstage, Mizuha rests and confesses to a member of the crew that she knows "one of the guys in the very last group". Cover: Iwashi Tsuyoshi (Yushin Mochizuki and Kanji Atago)
8	August 2, 2024	978-4-08-884140-3	August 19, 2025	978-1-9747-5608-7
28. "Manzai and Inheritance" (漫才と継承); 29. "Manzai and Wishes" (漫才と願い); 30. "Manzai and the Funniest in the Room" (漫才と一番面白いやつ); 31. "Manzai and a Reason" (笑いと理由)
Brutus take second with 564 points, just behind BGS; Taiyo congratulates Ryuki and calls Selinentius one of his inspirations. Mega Beef Bowl XL have an inauspicious start, standing in a human pyramid, making their setup inaudible and reneging on a promise to the organizers. The routine takes advantage of having three members, but the pyramid leaves the crowd and judges confused, scoring just 499. Sprechchor goes next, breaking the awkward tension immediately and building on the crowd's familiarity and sympathy, pull ahead of BGS with their well-rehearsed routine, earning a score of 569. As BGS leaves the winner's booth, the comedy agency offers them a spot without having to attend their academy, but they refuse. Backstage, Azemichi is revealed to be Everyday Shijimi. Before they perform, a flashback shows how Rising formed; Bunta was a late transfer into the class whose antics were led by Atsushi, and after Bunta starts upstaging him with subtle humor, Atsushi offers his life savings so Bunta will agree to be his comedy partner. Cover: Brutus (Nitta Tsutomu and Ryuki Nazutani)
9	December 4, 2024	978-4-08-884352-0	December 16, 2025	978-1-9747-5821-0
32. "Manzai and Natural Rivals" (漫才と天敵); 33. "Manzai and Judging Standards" (漫才と審査基準); 34. "Comedy and Backup" (笑いとバックアップ); 35. "Manzai and Connected Feelings" (漫才と繋ぐ想い)
Rising's long set-up resets the audience's mood and their routine proves to be an iconoclastic yet appealing hit, knocking Sprechchor from first with a score of 572. When the scores are announced, Atsushi and Bunta quarrel over who was funnier; Sprechchor's dour mood is dispelled as they arrive backstage to warm applause. A staff member has a letter to pass on from Mizuha. Shiba Inu World Tour goes next; from their flashback, we learn that intense Yo was a promising volleyball player while Shunsei was the team's mild-mannered manager with a pleasant public persona. One night, after Yo returns a book to the coach, he learns Shunsei is the coach's son. Despite Shunsei's advice not to push himself too hard in practice, Yo is injured during a match after ignoring aches and strains incurred during training. While recovering in the hospital, Shunsei tries to cheer him up by showing him comedy routines; Yo recognizes that Shunsei hides his interests to support his father's dream and vows to help Shunsei achieve comedy greatness instead. Shunsei reveals his ultimate dream (to own a Shiba Inu), prompting Yo to say his dream is a world tour, giving them their name. Their reunion routine is well-received but being similar to Rising, which had just preceded them, they fall short with a score of 566. As Shunsei walks off, he encourages OWTT through his tears. Cover: Shiba Inu World Tour (Shunsei Mimomi and Yo Onozuka)
10	May 2, 2025	978-4-08-884463-3	April 21, 2026	978-1-9747-6247-7
36. "Manzai and Oneself" (漫才と自分); 37. "Manzai and Stage Fright" (漫才とあがり症); 38. "Show-ha Shoten (Wave of Laughter Brings Euphoria)" (笑波衝天); 39. "Show-ha Shoten (Mild Damage on the Reef)" (小破礁転)
Mizuha clarifies that she is there to support OWTT. With the hopes of the crowd and the other contestants buoying them, OWTT takes the stage. Azemichi learned from his sister's advice, namely that a plausible story is more entertaining than an unbelievable fiction. Their routine, based on his non-farewell to Mizuha, is a monster hit, scoring 580 and catapulting them into first place. In the winner's box, OWTT thank Rising and try to return their medal, but Rising refuse and warn Azemichi and Taiyo to keep an eye out for their "revenge", a promise to beat OWTT at a future competition. In Passionate Sandbag's flashback, Haruka's first day of high school was just a continuation of the bullying he experienced in middle school until Matsuri intervened with them to stop. Later, he advised Haruka his weird actions ensure the bullying will continue, and his only path to acceptance is to bully those even weirder than him through insult comedy. Their routine falls flat onstage, as Sprechchor, Rising, Shiba Inu World Tour, and OWTT all performed warm, gentle routines, throwing Passionate Sandbag's abrasive routine into sharp contrast. Sandbag's arrogance is their downfall, as Matsuri refused to watch the preceding acts, so they try to adjust on the fly. Cover: Passionate Sandbag (Matsuri Okanda and Haruka Ataru)
11	September 4, 2025	978-4-08-884664-4	August 18, 2026	978-1-9747-1678-4
40. "Show-ha Shoten (Finished Flight Reaches Laughter Point)" (翔破笑点); 41. "Show-ha Shoten (Victor's Prize Is Presented)" (勝覇賞典); 42. "Show-ha Shoten (Funny Story in Focus)" (笑話焦点); 43. "Show-ha Shoten! (ショーハショーテン！)
In their flashback, Haruka asks Matsuri to convince his identical twin brother Yutaka, who is skeptical that mean-spirited comedy is the answer. Matsuri says that by winning the Wara-1 Koshien with "perfect results", the answer will be undeniable, but Yutaka is unconvinced. After their first joke flops, Passionate Sandbag pivot and begin winning the audience over with a routine featuring an unlikely criminal and exaggerated antics. OWTT are brought back onstage for the final scoring; Sandbag scores 530, placing eighth, and OWTT are crowned the champions. BGS invite most of the teams to dinner afterward. Mizuha shows up just as the letter is delivered to Azemichi and he finally has a chance to say what was on his mind and promptly has his heart crushed when she says she attended the show with her boyfriend. OWTT enter the actual Wara-1 but bomb in their first round and are eliminated. After an interview, Azemichi prepares for an on-air radio appearance by analyzing the characteristics of a good story. The final chapter unfolds after a six-year timeskip; Mega Beef Bowl XL have become comedy video streamers, revealing their picks for the best teams competing in Wara-1: Rising, Broken Glass Slipper, and Shiba Inu World Tour. Sprechchor won the competition the year before and are not competing. MBB then announce their absolute top team is OWTT, even though they have experienced loss after loss since winning the Wara-Ko six years before. Azemichi used the time to discard all of his comedy studies, blazing unprecedented paths, and OWTT advance to the finals. Cover: One-Way Ticket to the Top (Azemichi Shijima and Taiyo Higashikata)

== Reception ==
Danny Guan of Game Rant included Show-ha Shoten! on a list of the "Best Shonen Manga of 2021". Reviewing the first volume for School Library Journal, Joe Pascullo called the series "edutainment excellence" and wrote, "Not only will readers learn about the Japanese comedy scene but they'll also learn about the fundamentals of creating the art form from scratch." Antonio Mireles of The Fandom Post praised the teamwork between Azemichi and Taiyo as they work around each other's strengths and weaknesses, writing that the series plays to Obata's strengths by them being similar to the two protagonists of his earlier manga, Bakuman. Although he said the jokes start off strong and commended the English translator for going to great effort to make sure their meanings were not lost in translation, Mireles felt that the comedy "seams begin to rip apart" in the second chapter. He finished with, "The world needs a good laugh and Show-Ha Shoten! Is about to provide it to the world." Real Sound's Fujimoto also felt the "high school buddy" relationship was reminiscent of Bakuman, and praised Obata's art. He recommended the manga to those who want to understand the structure of owarai.

In a review for Multiversity Comics, Brian Salvatore wrote that at its heart, Show-ha Shoten! is a sports manga about something other than a sport and stated "comedy is handled as something that can be mastered if worked out enough [...] And while that is certainly true to a degree, it is a lot harder to show someone mastering timing or the art of writing a great sketch than it is to show someone attempting to break off a curveball." Citing the comedy routines as the worst part about the series, Salvatore explained that they have so much working against them; the "non-comedic commentary on comedy concept", a language barrier, and trying to write out text for a physical performance that also serves the plot and is not just a standalone skit. Overall, he called the first two chapters a good start to a story that suffers from trying to explain comedy.

Anime News Network's MrAJCosplay gave the first volume of Show-ha Shoten! an A grade for its "surprisingly thoughtful" reflections on what makes a good comedian, "incredibly tight" narrative, and for how much characterization the side and background characters are given. He also praised the art and overall presentation of the manga; "Faces are effectively exaggerated when appropriate, but the timing of having speech bubbles interject at certain moments, the way punch lines are saved for specific panels, and the surprisingly subtle attention to detail all left me with plenty of laugh-out-loud moments". His only criticism was the few jokes that might not land as a result of translation or cultural differences, but noted he could at least understand why others might find them funny. Patti Martinson of Sequential Tart called Shijima and Higashikata a classic comedy pairing in the vein of Laurel and Hardy, and wrote that their depth as characters and the motives behind their desires to succeed in the comedy business make a solid foundation for a series. Despite enjoying nearly everything about the first volume, Martinson gave it a "mixed review" for her sole complaint of not finding the jokes and comedy sketches funny.

== See also ==
- Not Me That Went Viral - novel of the same writer
