= Go Player (TV series) =

- 围棋少年
- Country of origin: China
- No. of episodes: 52

Original release
- Network: CCTV
- Release: 2006 – 2009

Go Player (Chinese: 围棋少年; pinyin: wéi qí shào nían, literally "Go Youngsters" or "Go Boy") is a children's animated series. It was produced in China.The first season is set in the late Ming Dynasty and follows the development of Jiang Liu'er, a young man with a talent for the game of Go.

The show spans two seasons with 26 episodes in each. The first season first aired on CCTV in 2006. The second season, called Go Player 2 (围棋少年2), aired in 2009.

== See also ==
- Hikaru no Go, a Japanese series about Go
