= School Judgment: Gakkyu Hotei =

Japanese manga series

- First tankōbon volume cover

学糾法廷
- Genre: Comedy thriller
- Manga
- Written by: Nobuaki Enoki
- Illustrated by: Takeshi Obata
- Published by: Shueisha
- English publisher: NA: Viz Media
- Imprint: Jump Comics
- Magazine: Weekly Shōnen Jump; Shōnen Jump+; (final chapter)
- English magazine: NA: Weekly Shonen Jump
- Original run: December 1, 2014 – May 27, 2015
- Volumes: 3
- icon

School Judgment: Gakkyu Hotei (Japanese: 学糾法廷, Hepburn: Gakkyū Hōtei) is a Japanese manga series written by Nobuaki Enoki and illustrated by Takeshi Obata. It is a relaunch of the manga Gakkyu Hotei that was published on the Jump Live smartphone manga service in 2013. It was serialized in Shueisha's Weekly Shōnen Jump from December 2014 to May 2015, and finished on the Shōnen Jump+ platform. Its chapters were collected in three tankōbon volumes. Viz Media published the first three chapters for its "Jump Start" initiative and then began to simulpublish the series in December 2014.

== Premise ==
The story revolves around children (specifically the 12-year-old main character Abaku Inugami) solving adult crimes in court at their elementary school, ranging from murder to drug usage in terms of criminal acts. Abaku has a skill called Ronpa, which is the act of using arguments to refute another's theories and verbally defeat them. He is a transfer student at Tenbin Elementary School which has recently declared the Classroom Arbitration Session system, and is used the way that if any disputes happen, they will be settled in a courtroom. There is also a rival for Inugami called Pine Hanzuki, who tries to prosecute the guilty people in her own cute but also ruthless way.

== Publication ==
School Judgement: Gakkyu Hotei is written by Nobuaki Enoki and illustrated by Takeshi Obata. It is a relaunch of the manga Gakkyu Hotei, written and illustrated by Enoki, and published on Shueisha's Jump Live smartphone manga service in 2013. It was serialized in Weekly Shōnen Jump from December 1, 2014, to May 11, 2015, and then moved over to Shōnen Jump+, so it would be able to wrap the final arc. The 24th and last chapter was released on May 27, 2015. Shueisha collected its chapters in three tankōbon volumes, released from May 1 to August 4, 2015.

Viz Media published the first three chapters for its "Jump Start" initiative and then began to simulpublish the series in December 2014.

=== Volumes ===
No.	Original release date	Original ISBN	English release date	English ISBN
1	May 1, 2015	978-4-08-880415-6	February 2, 2016	978-1-4215-8566-6
01. "The Suzuki Murder and Dismemberment Case"; 02. "The Suzuki Murder and Dismemberment Case 2"; 03. "The Pretty Idol Airi Takanashi Photo Voyeurism Case"; 04. "The Pretty Idol Airi Takanashi Photo Voyeurism Case 2"; 05. "The Shuichi Higashide Cheating Case"; 06. "The Shuichi Higashide Cheating Case 2"; 07. "Beware of the Magical Powder"
2	July 3, 2015	978-4-08-880430-9	April 5, 2016	978-1-4215-8567-3
08. "Beware of the Magical Powder 2"; 09. "Beware of the Magical Powder 3"; 10. "The Inu-Saru Reunion"; 11. "Civil Trial Arc (1): The Investigation"; 12. "Civil Trial Arc (2): The Courtroom"; 13. "Civil Trial Arc (3): The Staircase of Truth"; 14. "Evil Spirit 5-Meter Deep"; 15. "Evil Spirit 5-Meter Deep 2"; 16. "Evil Spirit 5-Meter Deep 3"
3	August 4, 2015	978-4-08-880466-8	June 7, 2016	978-1-4215-8568-0
17. "The Beginning of the End"; 18. "Dog vs. Pheasant"; 19. "I'm Not Afraid"; 20. "The Key"; 21. "Where the Ogre Dwells"; 22. "The Session That Started It All; One Shot: "Part A: Case Arc"; One Shot: "Part B: Courtroom Arc"

== Reception ==
Leroy Douresseaux from ComicBookBin called the first volume "a little weird, but it is surprisingly entertaining", praising as well Obata's artwork.
