= Yukari Yoshihara =

Japanese Go player

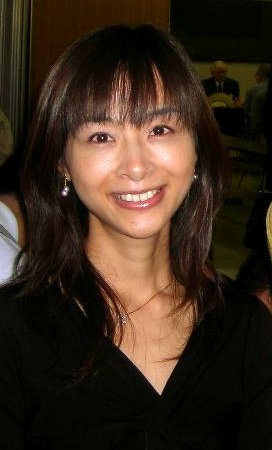

Personal information
- Native name: 吉原 由香里 (Japanese)
- Full name: Yukari Umezawa (梅沢 由香里)
- Born: October 4, 1973 (age 53) Tokyo, Japan

Sport
- Turned pro: 1996
- Teacher: Masao Kato
- Rank: 6 dan
- Affiliation: Nihon Ki-in

Yukari Yoshihara (吉原 由香里, Yoshihara Yukari; born October 4, 1973) née Yukari Umezawa (梅沢 由香里, Umezawa Yukari) is a Japanese Go professional.

== Biography ==
Yukari Umezawa was born in Tokyo in 1973, and graduated from Keio University in 1996. She first played Go at the age of 6 and she became a professional Go player in 1996. She then attained the rank of 5-dan in 2002 at the age of 29, and was married in the same year. Umezawa supervised the production of Hikaru no Go, a manga about Go written by Yumi Hotta and illustrated by Takeshi Obata. In 2002 she was starring in her own videogame Umesawa Yukari no Igo Seminar (梅沢由香里の囲碁セミナー) on Xbox - a Go simulator. She also became a consultant for the anime version of Hikaru no Go and hosted Go educational programs on NHK. Umezawa's sensei was Masao Kato. Umezawa is married to Shinya Yoshihara. They have a son (born 2011).

== Titles ==
| Title | Years Held |
|---|---|
| Current | 3 |
| (Japan) Women's Kisei | 2007, 2008, 2009 |
