= Yumi Hotta =

Japanese manga artist

Yumi Hotta 堀田 由美
- Born: October 15, 1957 (age 69) Okazaki, Japan
- Area: Manga artist
- Notable works: Hikaru no Go
- Collaborators: Takeshi Obata
- Awards: 45th Shogakukan Manga Award for shōnen manga - Hikaru no Go

Yumi Hotta (堀田 由美, Hotta Yumi; most often written as ほった ゆみ, born October 15, 1957) is a Japanese manga artist. Hotta is best known as the author of the best-selling manga Hikaru no Go, which is widely credited for the late 90s-2000s boom of the game of go in Japan.

The idea behind Hikaru no Go began when Yumi Hotta played a pick-up game of go with her father-in-law. She thought that it might be fun to create a manga based on this traditional board game, and began the work under the title of Nine Stars (九つの星, Kokonotsu no Hoshi), named for the nine "star points" on a go board. She later worked with Takeshi Obata (the illustrator) and Yukari Umezawa (5-Dan, the supervisor) in the creation of Hikaru no Go. She won the 2000 Shogakukan Manga Award and the 2003 Tezuka Osamu Cultural Prize for Hikaru no Go.

She also had a short manga series Yūto (ユート) about long track speed skating that ran in Weekly Shōnen Jump in 2005.

Hotta's husband is Kiyonari Hotta (堀田 清成, Hotta Kiyonari), another manga artist known for manga about horse-racing. He was also well known as a contributor to the Chunichi Shimbun where he illustrated under the pen name Yumi Hotta (ほった ゆみ, Hotta Yumi).

== See also ==
- Go players
