= Hikaru no Go =

1998–2003 Japanese manga series

- First tankōbon volume cover, featuring Hikaru Shindo

ヒカルの碁
- Genre: Coming-of-age; Sports; Supernatural
- Manga
- Written by: Yumi Hotta
- Illustrated by: Takeshi Obata
- Published by: Shueisha
- English publisher: NA: Viz Media
- Imprint: Jump Comics
- Magazine: Weekly Shōnen Jump
- English magazine: NA: Shonen Jump
- Original run: December 8, 1998 – July 14, 2003
- Volumes: 23
- Anime television series
- Directed by: Susumu Nishizawa (1–15); Jun Kamiya (16–58); Tetsuya Endo (58–75)
- Written by: Yukiyoshi Ōhashi
- Music by: Kei Wakakusa
- Studio: Studio Pierrot
- Licensed by: NA: Viz Media
- Original network: TXN (TV Tokyo)
- English network: US: ImaginAsian; Toonami Jetstream (streaming)
- Original run: October 10, 2001 – March 26, 2003
- Episodes: 75
- Anime television film

Hikaru no Go: Journey to the North Star Cup
- Directed by: Junichi Watanabe; Kunitoshi Okajima; Masoho Itō
- Written by: Michiko Yokote; Tetsuya Endo
- Music by: Kei Wakakusa
- Studio: Studio Pierrot
- Original network: TV Tokyo
- Released: January 3, 2004
- Runtime: 77 minutes
- Television drama

Qi Hun
- Directed by: Liu Chang
- Original run: October 27, 2020 – November 26, 2020
- Episodes: 36
- icon

Hikaru no Go (ヒカルの碁, lit. 'Hikaru's Go') is a Japanese manga series based on the board game Go, written by Yumi Hotta and illustrated by Takeshi Obata. The production of the series' Go games was supervised by Go professional Yukari Umezawa. It was serialized in Shueisha's Weekly Shōnen Jump from 1998 to 2003, with its chapters collected into 23 tankōbon volumes. The story follows Hikaru, who discovers a Go board in his grandfather's attic. The object turns out to be haunted by a ghost named Sai, the emperor's former Go teacher in the Heian era. Sai finds himself trapped in Hikaru's mind and tells him which moves to play against opponents, astonishing onlookers with the boy's apparent level of skill at the game.

It was adapted into an anime television series by Studio Pierrot, which ran for 75 episodes from 2001 to 2003 on TV Tokyo, with a New Year's Special aired in January 2004. Viz Media released both the manga and anime in North America; they serialized the manga in Shonen Jump, released its collected volumes in entirety, and the anime aired simultaneously on ImaginAsian.

Hikaru no Go has been well-received. The manga has had over 25 million copies in circulation, making it one of the best-selling manga series. It won the 45th Shogakukan Manga Award in 2000 and the 7th Tezuka Osamu Cultural Prize in 2003. It is largely responsible for popularizing Go among the youth of Japan since its debut and is considered by Go players everywhere to have sparked worldwide interest in the game, noticeably increasing the Go-playing population around the globe.

== Plot ==
While exploring his grandfather's shed, Hikaru Shindo stumbles across a Go board haunted by the spirit of Fujiwara-no-Sai, a Go player from the Heian era. Sai wishes to play Go again, having not been able to since the late Edo period when his ghost appeared to Honinbo Shusaku, a top Go player of that period. Sai's greatest desire is to attain the Kami no Itte (神の一手; "Divine Move") – a perfect move. Since Hikaru is the only person who can perceive him, Sai inhabits a part of Hikaru's mind as a separate personality although not always comfortably.

Urged by Sai, Hikaru begins playing Go despite his lack of interest in the game. He begins to execute moves that Sai dictates to him. Hikaru begins his Go career in a Go salon, where he defeats a young boy playing at a professional level, Akira Toya, twice by following Sai's instructions. He subsequently begins a quest to discover the source of Hikaru's strength, an obsession that will dominate his life. Hikaru becomes intrigued by the great dedication of Akira and Sai to the game and decides to start playing solely on his own. He is a complete novice at first but has some unique abilities to his advantage. For instance, once he has a basic understanding of Go, he can reconstruct a game play-by-play from memory. Through training at Go clubs, study groups, and practice games with Sai, he becomes an Insei and later a professional, meeting various dedicated Go players of different ages and styles along the way. He also demonstrates a natural talent for the game and remains determined to prove his own abilities to Akira, Sai, and himself.

Hikaru enters the Hokuto Cup, an international tournament for under-18 Japanese, Chinese, and Korean Go professionals. As the highest-ranking under-18 pro, Akira qualifies for the tournament, but Hikaru has to compete in a series of games to become one of the three Japanese competitors. His friends Waya and Ochi also enter the qualifying matches. He meets Kiyoharu Yashiro, a player from the Kansai Ki-in, whose style is as strange and offbeat as his own. Hikaru, along with Akira and Kiyoharu Yashiro, are selected to represent Japan, while Hong Suyong (a Korean Go player who was defeated by Hikaru earlier in the series) and two others represent Korea and three of Shinichiro Isumi's Chinese friends represent their country.

The captain of the Korean Go team, Ko Yong Ha, is interviewed and his remarks are translated for Japanese viewers. The translator makes an error which causes it to appear that he is disparaging the skill of Honinbo Shusaku, who, like Hikaru, was possessed by Sai. Although Ko Yong Ha later finds out, he refuses to correct the error and instead emphasizes it when he realizes that it enrages Hikaru, who takes it as a direct affront to Sai. Considering their achievements and skills, Hikaru is still slightly under Akira. Therefore, their team coach, Atsushi Kurata, chooses Akira to be captain. However, Hikaru wants to play against Ko Yong Ha to show him that Sai is the most skillful Go player in the game's history. Atsushi Kurata grants Hikaru's request when they play against Korea in the tournament because he sees the burning spirit in him. In the end, Hikaru loses by only half a point. Japan eventually comes in last, behind Korea and China. However, the Japanese team impressed both professionals from China and Korea because they did much better than expected. At the end of the game, Ko Yong Ha asks Hikaru for his reason for playing Go. With tears in his eyes, he answers with the line "To link the far past, with the far future". The hidden meaning of this line indicates the links and emotional relationships between Sai, Shusaku, and Hikaru. However, no one understands the context of this line besides Hikaru.

A bonus story, set shortly after the Hokuto Cup event, shows two Inseis ranked 14th and 16th, discussing whether Akira Toya or Hikaru Shindo is stronger. In the Young Lions tournament, they are each paired with Hikaru and Akira, making them change their minds about who is stronger. In the second round, Hikaru and Akira are paired against each other and begin a match but the conclusion is unknown.

== Media ==
=== Manga ===
Written by Yumi Hotta and illustrated by Takeshi Obata, Hikaru no Go was serialized in Weekly Shōnen Jump magazine from December 8, 1998, (Note: It debuted in the magazine's combined 2nd–3rd issue of 1999 (cover date January 8), released on December 8, 1998.) to July 14, 2003. Go professional Yukari Umezawa (5-dan) provided "supervision" for the series. The 189 chapters were collected into 23 tankōbon volumes by Shueisha; the first published on April 30, 1999, and the last on September 4, 2003. A kanzenban version was published in 20 volumes between February 4, 2009, and April 30, 2010. In 2012, the manga was published in a 12-volume bunkoban edition between February 17 and July 18.

Viz Media acquired the North American English-language rights to Hikaru no Go in June 2003. The series debuted in the January 2004 issue of Viz's Shonen Jump magazine, released in December 2003. However, after the April 2008 issue it was replaced by Slam Dunk. They released all 23 collected volumes from May 19, 2004, to May 3, 2011.

=== Anime ===
Hikaru no Go was adapted into an anime television series by Studio Pierrot. It was broadcast for 75 episodes on TV Tokyo from October 10, 2001, to March 26, 2003. A special, titled Hikaru no Go: Sabaki no Ikkyoku! Inishie no Hana yo Sake!! (ヒカルの碁 特別編・裁きの一局! いにしえの華よ咲け!!; lit. 'Hikaru no Go: Special Edition—The Game of Judgment! Bloom, O Flower of Antiquity!!'), was screened at the Jump Festa 2002 and later included on the Hikaru no Go DVD box set, released on November 6, 2009. A New Year's Special titled Hikaru no Go: Journey to the North Star Cup (ヒカルの碁 スペシャル 北斗杯への道, Hikaru no Go Hokuto-hai e no Michi) aired on January 3, 2004.

Viz Media acquired the North American English-language rights to the Hikaru no Go anime at the same time as the manga, in June 2003. The Ocean Group produced an English voice dub for the series. A "Sneak Preview" DVD of the first episode was included in the January 2006 issue of Shonen Jump (Volume 4, Issue 1) to subscribers. Viz began releasing the series on DVD on December 27, 2005. However, only eleven volumes were released (covering 45 episodes) before they were officially discontinued in April 2008. Hikaru no Go debuted on ImaginAsian TV in the United States on May 2, 2006. Each episode aired in subtitled Japanese every Tuesday, before the English dub of the same episode was shown on Saturday. It premiered on the online streaming service Toonami Jetstream on July 14, 2006, and ran until the service shut down in January 2009 with only three episodes remaining. The entire series was added to Netflix in 2011.

=== Video games ===
A series of three Go video games based on the series were created by Konami for the Game Boy Advance, released from October 25, 2001, to March 20, 2003; the third was also released on the GameCube. Hikaru and Sai also appear as support characters in the Weekly Shōnen Jump crossover game Jump Super Stars.

=== Live-action drama ===
A 36-episode Chinese live-action adaptation titled Qi Hun, directed by Liu Chang, was streamed on the iQIYI online platform from October 27 to November 26, 2020.

== Reception ==
=== Manga ===
By May 2013, the manga had over 25 million copies in circulation. Hikaru no Go won the 45th Shogakukan Manga Award in 2000; and the seventh Tezuka Osamu Cultural Prize in 2003. In November 2014, readers of Da Vinci magazine voted Hikaru no Go 14th on a list of Weekly Shōnen Jump's greatest manga series of all time. On TV Asahi's Manga Sōsenkyo 2021 poll, in which 150,000 people voted for their top 100 manga series, Hikaru no Go ranked 82nd.

Hikaru no Go dramatically increased the popularity of Go in Japan and elsewhere, particularly among young children. As a result, many Go clubs were started by people influenced by the manga. Go professional Yukari Umezawa served as the technical advisor for the anime and promoted the game on behalf of the Nihon Ki-in. She had a short one-minute special at the end of every episode instructing how to play Go.

Including it on a list of the best continuing manga of 2008, About.com's Deb Aoki wrote that Hikaru no Go "pulls off a pretty amazing feat" by taking a complex game most American manga readers have never heard of and making it "as fun, exciting and accessible as any competitive sport." Reviewing the series for the School Library Journal, Lori Henderson highly recommended Hikaru no Go as a "funny, touching, and slightly bittersweet" coming-of-age story. She praised Hotta's diverse and interesting characters who have rather complex relationships, and Takeshi's artwork, which "can make placing a stone on the board seem like a life or death situation." Henderson noted that, while some technical terms are used and explained, readers do not have to know how to play Go as the matches are more about the players than the actual mechanics of the game. She also noted that the ending of the series did not live up to its full potential.

=== Anime ===
In 2004, Hikaru no Go came in 18th on Animage readers poll of their Favorite Anime Series. In TV Asahi's 2005 Top 100 Anime poll, the series came in 83rd in the nationwide survey of multiple age groups and 93rd in the online poll. The following year, it came in 81st in the online poll.

== See also ==
- Go Player, a Chinese animated series about young Go players
