= Sakon, the Ventriloquist =

Japanese manga series

- First tankōbon volume cover, featuring Ukon (left) and Sakon Tachibana (right)

人形(からくり)草紙あやつり左近
- Genre: Mystery, supernatural
- Manga
- Written by: Masaru Miyazaki
- Illustrated by: Takeshi Obata
- Published by: Shueisha
- Imprint: Jump Comics
- Magazine: Weekly Shōnen Jump
- Original run: May 22, 1995 – January 1, 1996
- Volumes: 4
- Anime television series
- Directed by: Hitoyuki Matsui
- Produced by: Yasumichi Ozaki; Shirō Sasaki; Masaki Kaifu
- Music by: Norihiro Tsuru; Yuriko Nakamura
- Studio: TMS Entertainment
- Licensed by: NA: AnimEigo
- Original network: Wowow
- Original run: October 8, 1999 – March 31, 2000
- Episodes: 26
- Light novel
- Written by: Takashi Yamada; Maro Sharaku
- Illustrated by: Takeshi Obata
- Published by: Shueisha
- Imprint: Jump J-Books
- Published: April 26, 1996
- Volumes: 1
- icon

Sakon, the Ventriloquist (Japanese: 人形(からくり)草紙あやつり左近, Hepburn: Karakurizōshi Ayatsuri Sakon; lit. 'Puppet Story: The Puppeteer Sakon') is a Japanese manga series written by Masaru Miyazaki (under the alias Sharakumaro) and illustrated by Takeshi Obata. It was serialized in Shueisha's shōnen manga magazine Weekly Shōnen Jump from May 1995 to January 1996, with its chapters collected in four tankōbon bound volumes. The plot follows Tachibana Sakon, a bunraku puppeteer who solves mysteries with Ukon, a puppet. The manga was adapted into a 26-episode anime television series by TMS Entertainment and broadcast on the satellite network Wowow from October 1999 to March 2000.

== Synopsis ==
Sakon Tachibana is a young puppeteer from an Edo period tradition. His puppet, Ukon, was crafted by a master artisan over one hundred years ago. However, when Sakon performs ventriloquism with Ukon, the puppet magically transforms into a cheerful, chatty, and witty creature. Sakon somehow becomes involved in mysterious criminal cases. He has a sharp eye for detail and uncovers the truth in unusual ways. Using Ukon's voice and thoughts, he reveals secrets and solves difficult cases.

== Characters ==
Sakon Tachibana (橘 左近, Tachibana Sakon)
Voiced by: Megumi Ogata
A master puppeteer who likes to travel and solve mysteries along his journey with his puppet and best friend, Ukon. When he does not have Ukon with him, he is a very timid, humble young boy. However, once he places Ukon on his hand, he develops a careful, quiet, observant, and calculating personality. He is displayed as a brilliant young man who can solve any case, but feels that sometimes it is best "not to see everything so clearly", and is often underestimated by the criminals because of his young age and occupation as a puppeteer. He is also considered very cute, despite his young age, and is often hit on by older women, much to his embarrassment and annoyance. He often worries whenever Ukon is not with him, considering him as his family, and is shown to have a kind heart and will do his best to help those in need. It has been shown that when he was younger, he was often bullied for liking and playing with puppets, and that when he was seven, his father committed suicide after injuring another performer's face by accident.
Ukon (右近)
Voiced by: Motoko Kumai
A 100-year-old child doll, made in the early Meiji era by a famous puppet maker. When Sakon operates him, he appears to come to life, having a very distinct personality that differs drastically from Sakon's reserved, quiet nature (when he holds Ukon); however, the two continue to have a strong, sibling-like bond. He is loud, talkative, rude, and likes beautiful girls. He tends to jump to conclusions in his deductions of who the criminal is and becomes irritated if Sakon does not tell him what he is thinking or who he suspects is the criminal, often relying on him to explain his deduction of the crime. He is also the one to inspire confidence in Sakon and the victims of the case they are trying to solve. He also has the ability to allow the souls of the dead to take possession of his body to listen to their final words before their death, which often comes in handy when solving mysteries.
Kaoruko Tachibana (橘 薫子, Tachibana Kaoruko)
Voiced by: Miho Yamada
Sakon's aunt from his mother's side and assistant police detective. She often follows Sakon on his journeys so she can meet handsome men and eat delicious food, and believes herself to be a rare beauty. She also often focuses more on the motives of people involved in a crime rather than their alibis and possible method of murder, which she often relies on Sakon for. She insists that Sakon call her "Kaoruko nee-san" rather than "Kaoruko obaa-san" and hits Ukon whenever he insults her or says a careless remark.
Zenkichi Fujita (藤田 善吉, Fujita Zenkichi)
Voiced by: Ryotaro Okiayu
A photographer friend of Sakon's, who sometimes joins him on his travels, and helps in his investigations. He is obsessed with taking pictures, but tends to forget to take them, which Ukon makes note of.

== Media ==
=== Manga ===
Written by Masaru Miyazaki and illustrated by Takeshi Obata, Sakon, the Ventriloquist was serialized in Shueisha's shōnen manga magazine Weekly Shōnen Jump from May 22, 1995, to January 1, 1996. Shueisha collected its chapters in four tankōbon volumes released from August 4, 1995, to March 4, 1996.

==== Volumes ====
| No. | Japanese release date | Japanese ISBN |
|---|---|---|
| 1 | August 4, 1995 | 4-08-872021-0 |
| 2 | October 4, 1995 | 4-08-872022-9 |
| 3 | January 10, 1996 | 4-08-872023-7 |
| 4 | March 4, 1996 | 4-08-872024-5 |

=== Anime ===
A 26-episode anime television series produced by Tokyo Movie Shinsha aired on Wowow from October 8, 1999, to March 31, 2000. Humming Bird performed the opening theme "Hikari naki Yoru wo Yuke" (光なき夜をゆけ), and Akino Arai performed the ending theme "Kanaete" (叶えて).

In July 2026, AnimEigo announced that it will release the anime on Blu-ray in November of the same year.

==== Episodes ====
| No. | Title | Original release date |
|---|---|---|
| 1 | "Vengeful Demon of the Abandoned School – Part I" (Japanese: 「廃校の復讐鬼」〜第二段〜) | October 8, 1999 |
Funasaki Hazuki invites Sakon to a meeting of six members of her old primary school puppetry club in the now-abandoned building. Mysterious events occur and one of the group is killed. The bridge connecting the school to the village is destroyed and they are stranded with the investigating policeman.
| 2 | "Vengeful Demon of the Abandoned School – Part II" (Japanese: 「廃校の復讐鬼」〜第三段〜) | October 8, 1999 |
In the abandoned school, the students behave irrationally out of fear as one student after another is killed, including, it appears, the policeman.
| 3 | "Vengeful Demon of the Abandoned School – Part II" (Japanese: 「廃校の復讐鬼」〜第三段〜) | October 15, 1999 |
Sakon reveals that the policeman is the killer seeking revenge. He is the brother of Osamu, a student who committed suicide after the puppetry club members bullied him years ago.
| 4 | "The Izu Two-Faced Oni – Part I" (Japanese: 「豆州弐面鬼傀儡地獄」〜第二段〜) | October 22, 1999 |
Sakon takes Ukon to a puppet mansion to see a statue of a two-faced demon. While there, he encounters the pop idol Mai Kawai and her group of friends and affiliates. One of the group, Yagisawa, is killed when the two-faced demon statue falls on him. Sakon's aunt, Tachibana Kaoruko, believes that it was an accident, but Sakon suspects murder.
| 5 | "The Izu Two-Faced Oni – Part II" (Japanese: 「豆州弐面鬼傀儡地獄」〜第三段〜) | October 29, 1999 |
After a second person, Takamura, is killed with a Nihinto, Sakon suspects the killer is one of the group and believes that it is related to a murder that took place there 16 years earlier.
| 6 | "The Izu Two-Faced Oni – Part III" (Japanese: 「豆州弐面鬼傀儡地獄」〜第四段〜) | November 5, 1999 |
As Sakon was carrying out his investigation, Yagisawa confessed his guilt and then jumped to his death.
| 7 | "The Izu Two-Faced Oni – Part IV" (Japanese: 「左近からくり変化の章」〜第一段〜) | November 12, 1999 |
Sakon deduces that Yagisawa committed suicide to protect the identity of Sato, Mai's mother who killed her abusive husband in the puppet mansion 16 years ago and who has been managing Mai under an assumed identity. Sakon reveals that it was Sato who killed Sugiyama because he was blackmailing her.
| 8 | "Sakons Puppet: The Ghost Chapter – Part I" (Japanese: 「左近からくり変化の章」〜第二段〜) | November 19, 1999 |
Ukon needs repairs, so Sakon leaves the puppet with the craftsman Hayami at Fukami's puppetry workshop. When Sakon returns to retrieve Ukon there is a gas explosion and fire in Hayami's workshop and living quarters and Hayami is burned to death.
| 9 | "Sakons Puppet: The Ghost Chapter – Part II" (Japanese: 「左近からくり変化の章」〜第三段〜) | November 26, 1999 |
Fortunately Ukon had already been repaired by Sensei Fukami and was not in Hayami's workshop when it burned down. Everyone believes the explosion was caused by the young girl Saya's cat Ririsu that was also killed in the fire, but Sakon is suspicious. Sakon suspects that someone removed the gas hose, and plugged the outlet with cheese. The cat Ririsu then ate the cheese, releasing the gas and making it look like an accidental explosion. Next, Yoshida, another craftsman and one of the suspects, appears to have hanged himself.
| 10 | "Sakons Puppet: The Ghost Chapter – Part III" (Japanese: 「信州百狐血雨地獄」〜第一段〜) | December 3, 1999 |
Sakon deduces from evidence that a left-handed person committed both murders, but everyone there is right-handed. Sako discovers that Aoki, an assistant with his head bandaged from a fire years earlier, is really left-handed. Sakon uses Ukon to mimic the voices of the dead men, tricking Aoki into confessing that he is the killer. It is revealed that Aoki is in reality the ex-husband of Keiko, Hayami's partner, and Aoki is seeking revenge for the death of their daughter years earlier in the fire that disfigured him when he tried to save her.
| 11 | "The Blood Rain of the One Hundred Foxes of Shinshu – Part I" (Japanese: 「信州百狐血雨地獄」〜第二段〜) | December 10, 1999 |
Sakon is invited by the Akizuki family to give a Bunraku performance. After the performance, the head of the family, Souichirou Akizuki receives a call and suddenly leaves. Meanwhile, Sakon is told that there have been slasher killings in the nearby village, and Akizuki's eldest son, Kyouichi is the main suspect. He has gone missing with an apparently cursed Byakko sword. A few hours later, another call is received saying that Souichirou has been murdered by his own son!
| 12 | "The Blood Rain of the One Hundred Foxes of Shinshu – Part II" (Japanese: 「信州百狐血雨地獄」〜第三段〜) | December 17, 1999 |
Sakon suspects foul play, and finds blood spatters on hydrangea flowers in the nearby Byakko Temple grounds. Legend says that the Temple was built to venerate the spirits of 100 foxes whose blood the master swordsmith Muramasa used during the quenching process to forge the Byakko sword. Sakon suggests that someone else killed Souichirou Akizuki and placed the blame on his son Kyouichi.
| 13 | "The Blood Rain of the One Hundred Foxes of Shinshu – Part III" (Japanese: 「埃及大王呪術地獄」〜第一段〜) | December 24, 1999 |
Sakon holds a seance with Ukon where Kyouichi's voice appears to reveal that he is dead and buried near flowers. A family friend, Oki Katsumi, reveals himself as the killer when he tries to dig up Kyouichi's body. Katsumi attacks with the Byakko sword, but breaks it on a stone fox statue and he is killed by the broken blade.
| 14 | "Curse of the Egyptian Pharaoh – Part I" (Japanese: 「埃及大王呪術地獄」〜第二段〜) | January 7, 2000 |
Sakon visits the Ran'ou Museum to see his old Elementary School Master and mentor Kisaragi Ittetsu. Suddenly the Museum's director Yuuki Mari is found dead, killed by an Egyptian knife which was to be the main attraction in a new exhibition. Kaoruko finds evidence pointing to Kisaragi as the killer.
| 15 | "Curse of the Egyptian Pharaoh – Part II" (Japanese: 「埃及大王呪術地獄」〜第三段〜) | January 14, 2000 |
Sakon believes that Kisaragi is innocent. He also finds that there are numerous tensions within the museum staff and that the director was unpopular. Sakon asks Kaoruko to delay the arrest for 24 hours to give him time to prove Kisaragi's innocence.
| 16 | "Curse of the Egyptian Pharaoh – Part III" (Japanese: 「埃及大王呪術地獄」〜第四段〜) | January 21, 2000 |
During the investigation, Isshiki, the museum's manager becomes the main suspect but he seems to have a watertight alibi because he lives a long distance from the museum. Sakon suspects that he is living nearby with a female museum staff member, Takahashi, but then she is killed in the museum by a falling statue.
| 17 | "Curse of the Egyptian Pharaoh – Part IV" (Japanese: 「薪能薫悲恋情」〜第一段〜) | January 28, 2000 |
Kaoruko finds evidence that Isshiki has been living at Takahashi's house, and then Sakon discovers that the telephone handsets in the museum had been tampered with. Sakon tricks Isshiki into revealing that he knew about the telephone tampering, discrediting his alibi and exposing him as the murderer. It appears that Museum's director Yuuki Mari realized that the Egyptian knife that Isshiki purchased was a fake. Isshiki then killed her to hide his grave professional mistake.
| 18 | "The Sympathy of Kaoru's Disappointed Love – Part I" (Japanese: 「薪能薫悲恋情」〜第二段〜) | February 4, 2000 |
Sakon travels with Kaoruko to the house of Noh master Kujou to meet Naoto, the senior apprentice and potential partner in an arranged marriage. They find friction in the household with the eldest son Kouei a drunkard, jealous of his talented younger half-brother Eimei. On the eve of Naoto's final performance for the Kujou school, master Kujou is shot through the head by an arrow from a cross-bow some distance away. Kaoruko commences an investigation, with everyone under suspicion, including the niece Aki and long term attendant Tsubota.
| 19 | "The Sympathy of Kaoru's Disappointed Love – Part II" (Japanese: 「薪能薫悲恋情」〜第三段〜) | February 11, 2000 |
Aki reveals that Kouei is in deep in debt for gambling and becomes the main suspect, but Sakon reveals that the arrow was triggered by a timer, making anyone the potential killer. Because the crossbow was on a timer, they cannot determine if Kujou or Naoto was the target. Naoto finds a threatening note in his room, fired by the same crossbow that killed master Kujou, and then Aki is found stabbed to death by someone wearing an Oni mask. Following the attacker, they find Kouei dead in a crashed car with the Oni mask and costume, indicating that may have been the murderer all along.
| 20 | "The Sympathy of Kaoru's Disappointed Love – Part III" (Japanese: 「奥飛騨幽霊奇譚」〜第一段〜) | February 18, 2000 |
Sakon realizes that Aki was an accomplice in the murder of Kujou, but is unconvinced that Kouei was the mastermind. Tsubota tells Sakon and Kaoruko how Eimei's mother was forbidden to enter the Kujou school and 10 years ago committed suicide in protest at not being able to see her son, pointing to Eimei as the murderer. However, Eimei is found dead at the bottom of a cliff by Naoto. To Kaoruko's surprise, Sakon eventually reveals that Naoto is the mastermind behind the murders, using Tsubota to help him rid the Kujou school of what he saw as its unworthy successors, enabling him to take over himself. Kaoruko is deeply hurt by Naoto's callous behaviour, but tries not to show it.
| 21 | "Eccentric Talk of the Okuhida Ghost – Part I" (Japanese: 「奥飛騨幽霊奇譚」〜第二段〜) | February 25, 2000 |
Sakon, Ukon, and Zenkichi go to Hida Takayama for a puppeteer festival and apparently see a ghost, the spirit of Nishimura Tsukiko. She was said to have committed suicide after making a mistake at the hospital where she worked and her fiance Numata Mitsuru's sister Youko died. Since then Numata Mitsuru has changed incurred gambling debts. Hoshie says she can't believe that her sister Tsukiko made a medical mistake or took her own life as that was completely out of character. Later Sakon and his group apparently see the ghost of Tsukiko push Numata Mitsuru to his death at a nearby hot springs.
| 22 | "Eccentric Talk of the Okuhida Ghost – Part II" (Japanese: 「奥飛騨幽霊奇譚」〜第三段〜) | March 3, 2000 |
Sakon's investigations find that Dr. Kobayashi had Youko hospitalized even though she was not very ill. He also frequented a club in Tokyo where she worked as a hostess. Meanwhile, there are more ghostly sightings of Tsukiko, and the next day, Dr. Kobayashi is found hanged after being lured to a warehouse by a note from Tsukiko. Just then, Tsukiko walks by, suffering from amnesia. Hoshie explains to her who she is and Tsukiko gives them a videotape she found nearby. The tape shows Dr. Kobayashi being attacked in the warehouse, apparently by Tsukiko.
| 23 | "Eccentric Talk of the Okuhida Ghost – Part III" (Japanese: 「恋花時雨咲乱舞」〜第一段〜) | March 10, 2000 |
On closer examination of the videotape, it appears that someone else was also in the warehouse before Dr. Kobayashi was killed. The ambitious Hospital director Terao appears to be the only one to benefit from the deaths. On their way to question Terao, his water mill house explodes with him inside. Sakon believes that he knows the killer, and catches and confronts Numata Mitsuru who is still alive after faking his own death. With these events, and the sight of a Takayama doll, Tsukiko recovers her memory, but has no recollection of recent events and is protected from the knowledge of her former fiance Mitsuri's murders.
| 24 | "Love Flowers Tearfall Profuse Bloom Dance – Part I" (Japanese: 「恋花時雨咲乱舞」〜第二段〜) | March 17, 2000 |
During a family puppetry event, Sakon's grandfather Tachibana Saemon collapses during the performance. Later he declares Sakon as his successor, much to the dismay of other older puppeteers. During the play, "Love Flowers Tearfall Profuse Bloom Dance" led by Sakon, the most senior puppeteer, Niemon, collapses and dies on stage while manipulating the puppet of the demon which is said to be cursed.
| 25 | "Love Flowers Tearfall Profuse Bloom Dance – Part II" (Japanese: 「恋花時雨咲乱舞」〜第三段〜) | March 24, 2000 |
Niemon Tomonori is found to have died from cyanide poisoning from a needle embedded in the demon puppet. A comment by Tomonori's son makes Sakon think the poison was meant for him. Later, two attempts are made on Sakon's life and his room is ransacked. Sakon suspects that someone from the Suou puppet school is involved. Zenkichi discovers that the collapse of the Suou school 20 years ago was partly attributed by the media to Sakon's grandfather Saemon. Following a visit to the abandoned Suou household, Zenkichi sees Ayano and then someone tries to run his motorcycle off the road.
| 26 | "Love Flowers Tearfall Profuse Bloom Dance – Part III" (Japanese: 「恋花時雨咲乱舞」〜第三段〜) | March 31, 2000 |
Zenkichi crashes his motorcycle and Shinozaki admits responsibility. However, Sakon suspects the puppet hairdresser Ayano and confronts her in the theater. She reveals that she and her brother wanted revenge on the Tachibana family for the calamity that befell the Suou family: her father committing suicide and her mother going insane. After her brother suicided 10 years ago, her hatred for the Tachibanas grew and she was driven by the need for revenge. Saemon intervenes and shows her a letter from her brother to Sakon's father when he committed suicide, forgiving the Tachibana family and hoping that Ayano will give up thoughts of revenge. Afterward, Sakon cannot practice, but Shiho uses Ukon to break his somber mood, and Sakon goes on to give his first public performance.
