= Takeshi Obata =

Japanese manga artist (born 1969)

Takeshi Obata 小畑 健
- Born: February 11, 1969 (age 57) Niigata, Niigata Prefecture, Japan
- Areas: Manga artist; illustrator
- Notable works: Hikaru no Go; Death Note; Bakuman; Platinum End
- Collaborators: Yumi Hotta; Tsugumi Ohba
- Awards: Tezuka Award (1985); Shogakukan Manga Award (1999); Tezuka Osamu Cultural Prize (2003); Eagle Award (2008)

Takeshi Obata (小畑 健, Obata Takeshi; born February 11, 1969) is a Japanese manga artist that usually works as the illustrator in collaboration with a writer. He first gained international attention for Hikaru no Go (1999–2003) with Yumi Hotta, but is better known for Death Note (2003–2006) and Bakuman (2008–2012) with Tsugumi Ohba. Obata has mentored several well-known manga artists, including Nobuhiro Watsuki of Rurouni Kenshin fame, Black Cat creator Kentaro Yabuki, and Eyeshield 21 artist Yusuke Murata.

== Career ==
Takeshi Obata chose to be a manga artist because he always loved drawing. As a child he re-read Shotaro Ishinomori's Cyborg 009 over and over. His first published manga was in Higashi-Yamanoshita Elementary's school newspaper when he was in the third grade. It was about a hero who turned into a disposable pocket warmer when in trouble. Obata originally became noticed in 1985 when he took a prize in the Tezuka Award for his one-shot 500 Kōnen no Shinwa. Joining the Weekly Shōnen Jump staff, he mentored under Makoto Niwano before starting his first major series, writing and drawing Cyborg Jii-chan G in 1989. After this series, Obata began collaborating with other writers.

Sakon, the Ventriloquist, with author Sharakumaro, became his first work to be adapted into an anime. He then created Hikaru no Go with Yumi Hotta, which received the 1999 Shogakukan Manga Award and the 2003 Tezuka Osamu Cultural Prize. With 25 million collected volumes in circulation, it was adapted into an anime and became his first work to be released in North America.

In 2003 he teamed up with Tsugumi Ohba to create Death Note. It became his biggest hit to date, with 30 million copies in circulation, an anime adaptation, five live-action films, two live-action TV drama and a musical. Obata served as the artist of Blue Dragon Ral Grad, a manga adaptation of the fantasy video game Blue Dragon, from December 2006 to July 2007.

In the fall of 2007, he drew the short story "Hello Baby" with writer Masanori Morita, which appeared in Jump Square. This was followed a year later by "Urōboe Uroboros!" with Nisio Isin, who authored the Death Note Another Note: The Los Angeles BB Murder Cases novel.

He then reunited with Tsugumi Ohba for Bakuman., which ran from August 2008 to April 2012. It was Shueisha's first manga to be released online in multiple languages before becoming available in print outside Japan and had over 15 million copies in publication as of May 2014. In 2014, he drew a manga adaptation of All You Need Is Kill with Ryōsuke Takeuchi, basing the character designs on Yoshitoshi ABe's original cover to the novel. He reunited with Nisio Isin for the one-shot "RKD-EK9", that ran in the December 2014 issue of Jump Square.

Obata followed this by working with Nobuaki Enoki to relaunch Enoki's School Judgment: Gakkyu Hotei digital one-shot as a serial in the first issue of Weekly Shōnen Jump for 2015. However, the magazine stopped publishing it after the year's 24th issue and the series finished in the digital Shōnen Jump+ on May 27. It was serialized in English in the digital Weekly Shonen Jump.

From 2015 to 2021, Obata created another series with Ohba called Platinum End. Starting in the December 2015 issue of Jump Square on November 4, 2015, the manga ended on January 4, 2021. The series had over 4.5 million copies in circulation by December 2020, and an anime adaptation began airing on television in October 2021. In October 2021, Obata teamed up with novelist Akinari Asakura to start the owarai-themed manga series Show-ha Shoten! in the November issue of Jump Square.

In addition to his manga work, Obata has also done character design work for the video game Castlevania Judgment, as well as illustrating several light novels. He provided character designs for Madhouse's anime adaptations of Osamu Dazai's No Longer Human and Natsume Sōseki's Kokoro, which are parts of the Aoi Bungaku series. He drew manga manuscripts seen in the 2015 live-action film adaptation of Bakuman that were later published in the Eiga Bakuman. Takeshi Obata Illustration Works book. He also designed a new CGI character for the 2016 Death Note: Light Up the New World live-action film. On May 3, 2016, Viz Media published Obata's 2006 art book Blanc et Noir in North America.

== Personal life ==
On September 6, 2006, Obata was arrested for illegal possession of an 8.6 cm knife when he was pulled over in Musashino, Tokyo for driving with his car's headlights off at 12:30 am. The artist claimed he kept the knife in his car for when he goes camping.

== Works ==
=== Manga ===
- 500 Kōnen no Shinwa (500光年の神話) (1985)
- Cyborg Jii-chan G (CYBORGじいちゃんG（サイボーグじいちゃんジー）) (1989)
- Arabian Lamp Lamp (魔神冒険譚(アラビアン)ランプ・ランプ) with Susumu Sendo (1991–1992)
- Chikarabito Densetsu -Oni o Tsugu Mono- (力人伝説 -鬼を継ぐもの-) with Masaru Miyazaki (1992–1993)
- Sakon, the Ventriloquist (人形(からくり)草紙あやつり左近, Karakurizōshi Ayatsuri Sakon) with Sharakumaro (1995–1996)
- Hikaru no Go (ヒカルの碁) with Yumi Hotta and supervised by Yukari Yoshihara (1998–2003)
- Hajime (はじめ) with Otsuichi (2003)
- Death Note with Tsugumi Ohba (2003–2006)
- Ral Grad (BLUE DRAGON ラルΩグラド) with Tsuneo Takano (2006–2007)
- Hello Baby with Masanori Morita (2007)
- Uro-oboe Uroboros! (うろおぼえウロボロス!) with Nisio Isin (2008)
- Bakuman (バクマン。) with Tsugumi Ohba (2008–2012)
- All You Need Is Kill with Ryōsuke Takeuchi (2014)
- RKD-EK9 with Nisio Isin (2014)
- School Judgment: Gakkyu Hotei (学糾法廷, Gakkyū Hōtei) with Nobuaki Enoki (2014–2015)
- Platinum End (プラチナエンド) with Tsugumi Ohba (2015–2021)
- Show-ha Shoten! (ショーハショーテン！) with Akinari Asakura (2021–2025)

=== Art books ===
- Aya - Hikaru no Go Illustration Collection (彩―ヒカルの碁イラスト集) (April 2002)
- Blanc et Noir (May 31, 2006)
- Eiga Bakuman. Takeshi Obata Illustration Works (映画バクマン。 小畑健イラストワークス) (October 2, 2015)

== Awards and nominations ==
- 1985 Tezuka Award for "500 Kōnen no Shinwa"
- 1999 Shogakukan Manga Award for Hikaru no Go
- 2003 Tezuka Osamu Cultural Prize Creative Award for Hikaru no Go
- 2007 Nominated - Tezuka Osamu Cultural Prize Grand Prize for Death Note
- 2008 Nominated - Angoulême International Comics Festival Official Selection for Death Note
- 2008 Nominated - Eisner Award for Best Penciller/Inker for Death Note
- 2008 Eagle Award for Favourite Manga for Death Note
- 2010 Nominated - Manga Taishō for Bakuman.
