= Sakon Nakhon (disambiguation) =

Sakon Nakhon may refer to places in Thailand:

- the town Sakon Nakhon
- Sakon Nakhon Province
- Sakon Nakhon district
