= NHK General TV =

Main television service of NHK

- Logo used since 2020
- Country: Japan
- Broadcast area: Nationwide
- Headquarters: NHK Broadcasting Center, Shibuya, Tokyo, Japan

Programming
- Language: Japanese (English/original language available as sub-audio on bilingual programs)
- Picture format: 1080i HDTV (downscaled to letterboxed 480i for the SDTV feed)

Ownership
- Owner: NHK
- Sister channels: Educational; BS; BS Premium 4K; BS8K

History
- Launched: February 1, 1953; 73 years ago

Availability

Terrestrial
- Digital terrestrial (ISDB): Channel 1 (Channel 3 in prefectures where a commercial station operates on channel 1)

NHK General TV (NHK総合テレビジョン, NHK Sōgō Terebijon), abbreviated on-screen as NHK G, is the main television service of NHK, the Japanese public broadcaster. Its programming includes news, drama, quiz/variety shows, music, sports, anime, and specials which compete directly with the output of its commercial counterparts. The channel is well known for its nightly newscasts, regular documentary specials, and popular historical dramas. A similar counterpart would be, to a lesser extent, BBC One in the UK. Among the programs NHK General TV broadcasts are the annual New Year's Eve spectacular Kōhaku Uta Gassen, the year-long Taiga drama, and the daytime Asadora.

The name is often abbreviated in Japanese to Sōgō Terebi (総合テレビ) ("GTV" and "NHK G" are also used). The word Sōgō (general) serves to differentiate the channel from NHK's other television services, NHK Educational TV, NHK BS 1, NHK BS 2 (closed in 2011) and NHK BS HI (changed to BS Premium).

Launched on February 1, 1953, NHK was Japan's only television channel prior to the launch of Nippon Television on August 28, 1953.

NHK's programs are produced in accordance with the Japan Broadcasting Corporation Broadcasting Code.

== Overview ==
Opened in Tokyo on February 1, 1953, this channel is Japan's first TV channel. The common name general television was given because of its generalist status in contrast to NHK Educational Television (commonly known as E-tele since 2011), which is also broadcast on terrestrial waves.

Compared to ETV, which organizes programs that are almost unified throughout Japan, General Television has different programming for each region produced by NHK's regional stations. Therefore, wide-area broadcasting in the analog phase was only in the Kanto wide area (1 metropolitan area and 6 prefectures), and the other 40 prefectures had prefectural broadcasting. In the digital phase, Ibaraki Prefecture moved to prefectural broadcasting in 2004, and Tochigi and Gunma prefectures moved to prefectural broadcasting in 2012, leaving only four prefectures in Southern Kanto for wide-area broadcasting. Nationally aired news programs on the channel are produced by the NHK news department from Tokyo studios.

At the beginning of General TV's broadcasting, it was far from popular with general households, and it was difficult to produce TV programs independently. NHK management, in order to beat up the forthcoming competitions in the months that followed the launch, decided to bring several NHK Radio programs to be adapted to the new medium.

General TV's all-day audience rating in the Kanto area (surveyed by Video Research) was ranked first in a row for 24 years from 1963 to 1986, pushing out each commercial key station. However, in 1987, it handed over the all-day viewer rating to Fuji TV, and regained it in 1988 and 1989, but it has been far from that position since 1989.

== History ==
NHK conducted experimental broadcasts in 1939-1940 (interrupted due to its entry in the war); the callsign of the station in Tokyo was J2PQ, video frequency 4.5 MHz, output 500W.

In 1950, following the end of occupation, an experimental VHF service started in Tokyo on channel 3 (similar experiments were also carried out in Nagoya and Osaka) one hour a day, three days a week.

The first regular broadcast was carried out on February 1, 1953 from Tokyo, under the JOAK-TV callsign. In 1953 alone, the station had more remote broadcasts than an average television station in the United States at the time, from sports to theatrical performances. Using remote transmissions was more convenient at the time given the fact that its studio facilities were reduced. The station broadcast for six hours a day at the time.

The first stations outside Tokyo to sign-on were JOBK-TV in Osaka (March 1, 1954 at 8 A.M.) and JOCK-TV in Nagoya (the same day at 11am). At 2 P.M. that day, a special program was broadcast to introduce the new stations, with congratulatory messages from officials of the respective cities.

The network expanded to cover Sendai, Hiroshima and Fukuoka in 1956. That same year, in preparation for the start of CBC's television station in Nagoya, the Nagoya station moved from channel 5 to channel 3, as the old frequency was set to be used by CBC. From May 29 to December 23, 1957, further stations opened in Nagano, Shizuoka, Kanazawa, Okayama, Matsuyama and Kokura (Kitakyushu). The first morning broadcast was on October 7, 1957 and the first experimental color broadcast in Tokyo, on December 28.

On November 29, 1958, the Osaka station moved from channel 4 to channel 2 in anticipation for the start of MBS's television station, and on April 6, 1959, the Tokyo station moved from channel 3 to channel 1 to accommodate NHK Educational's main station in Tokyo, to achieve better coverage in the Kanto area.

On March 20, 1966, the National Telegraph and Telephone Public Corporation (now NTT) completed the standardization works for color TV microwave lines throughout Japan (excluding the area between Kagoshima and Naze). It is now possible to carry out color TV broadcasts via the network throughout the country, and with the exception of some remote island areas such as Amami Oshima, the development of colorization throughout the country has been completed.

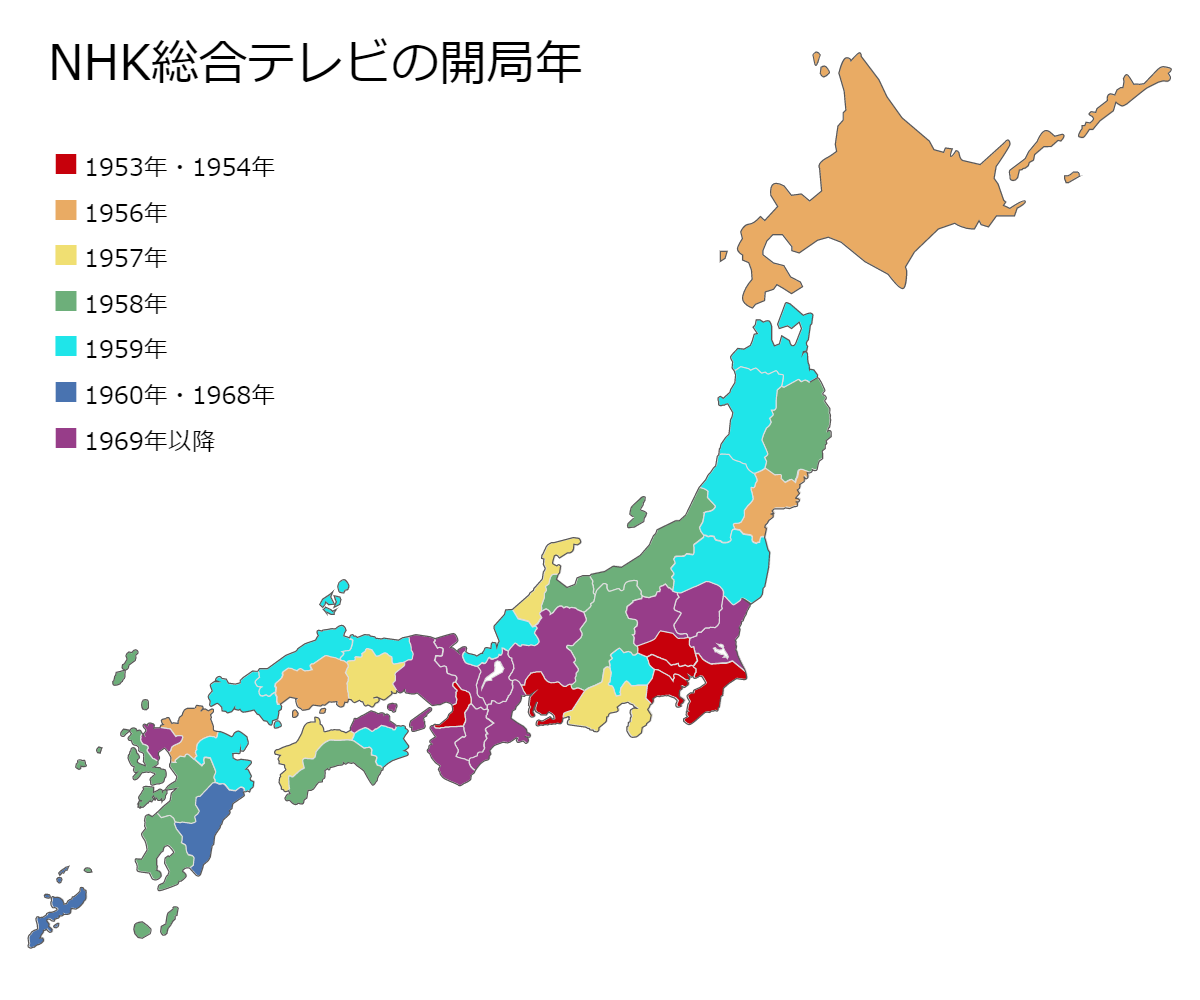
The development of NHK General Television's network by prefecture through phases

JOSP-TV in Saga became NHK General's first UHF station when its regular broadcasts started on March 15, 1969. After that, UHF stations opened in Takamatsu, five prefectures in the Kansai region other than Osaka, Tsu, and Gifu, and prefectural broadcasting began. On December 21, experimental broadcasting of bilingual audio multiplex broadcasting begins in Tokyo and Osaka.

On October 10, 1971, NHK General began full-scale colorization of the program. Due to this colorization, black-and-white broadcasting excluding reruns of past works has disappeared from Japanese TV programs. Coinciding with this move, the local news units made the switch. In May 1972, following the reversion agreement of the Ryukyu Islands from the United States to Japan, NHK General TV started broadcasting in Okinawa using the infrastructure of the former OHK.

Due to the influence of the first oil crisis, after January 16, 1974, the midnight broadcast was suspended. In 1975, the analog UHF experimental stations in Tokyo and Osaka were closed; the time saving measures due to the oil crisis were completely lifted for the first time in one year, two and a half months. It was only in April 1984, all weekday broadcasts end at 12am, completely ending the late-night broadcast suspension that had continued since the oil crisis.

Regarding analog sound multiplex broadcasting, it was first implemented from December 1982; Teletext broadcasting (subtitled broadcasting) started later in 1985.

On September 19, 1988, as Emperor Showa was in critical condition, all-night broadcasts began in the form of fillers, reporting on his condition from time to time. When the Emperor died on January 7, 1989, NHK suspended all programs except for educational broadcasts, including the serial asadora Jun-chan no ōenka and the Taiga drama Kasuga no Tsubone, but continued to broadcast special programs in memory of Emperor Showa and special programs for the enthronement of the new Emperor until the early hours of the January 9. The temporary all-night broadcast will end, but a regular program will be scheduled by 1am until March.

On January 17, 1995, when the Great Hanshin earthquake occurred, NHK began a special news program at 5:51pm on all broadcast channels, including Educational TV; all regular programming were suspended. From February onwards, the program returned to its normal format, but until the end of February (until the end of March in the Kansai region) the program focused on reporting on the earthquake disaster.

In April 1996, NHK General began broadcasting 24 hours a day on weekends (Fridays and Saturdays late at night); the weekday broadcast time was also expanded to 2am. The following year, the network expanded the 24 hour broadcast to weekdays, excluding early Monday mornings.

In April 2000, NHK General started simultaneous subtitle broadcasting of live broadcast programs using teletext. 24 hour a day broadcasting was also expanded to Sunday.

On December 1, 2003, NHK General started broadcasting terrestrial digital television at each broadcasting station in three metropolitan areas.

In March 2004, NTT Communications' relay lines completely transitioned from analog lines using microwaves to digital lines using optical fiber. In conjunction with this, the line operation system will be unified from Tokyo. On October 1, NHK General launched JOEP-DTV in Mito as its first digital television station since Tsu NHK General station, which was started its regular broadcast during analog days 31 years prior. Prior to that, NHK Mito relays its television station from Tokyo.

== Coverage ==
=== Current ===
==== Broadcasting rights ====
===== Football =====
- FIFA
  - National teams
    - Men's :
      - FIFA World Cup (including qualifiers for Europe (all matches) and Asia (all matches))
- The JFA Emperor's Cup
- JFA
  - Japan national football team (World Cup and all Asian Cup qualifiers from first round, with exclusive coverage for all friendlies)
    - Women's :
- FIFA Women's World Cup
- Japan women's national football team

===== Baseball =====
- Nippon Professional Baseball
- Major League Baseball

===== Rugby union =====
- Rugby World Cup

===== Golf =====
- PGA Tour

===== Horse-racing =====
- Japan Cup

===== Ice hockey =====
- All Japan Ice hockey Championship

===== Tennis =====
- Wimbledon

===== Sumo =====
- Grand Sumo

===== Multi-sport events =====
- Summer Olympic Games
- Winter Olympic Games
- Asian Games

== NHK domestic stations and FM / AM / GTV services ==
Places in bold refer to where the main station of each region is located.

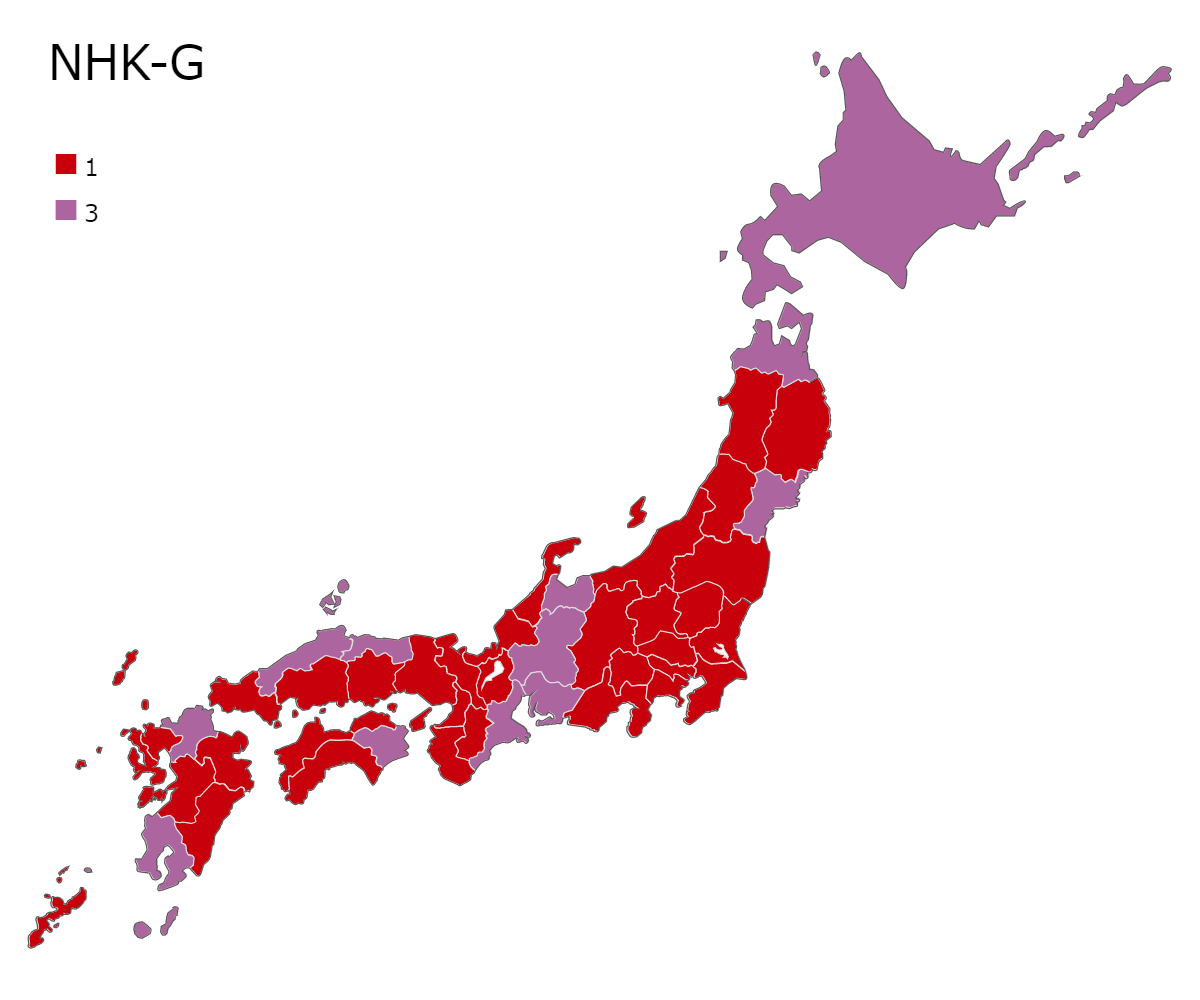
Channel designation for NHK General. Areas marked with red are assigned to Channel 1 while those in purple are assigned to Channel 3.

Region	Station (name in Kanji)	Analog (only Analog TV closed)				Digital		Prefecture
Region	Station (name in Kanji)	FM	AM	General TV				Prefecture
Region	Station (name in Kanji)	Call sign			Ch.	LCN	Call sign	Prefecture
Hokkaidō	**Sapporo (札幌)**	JOIK-FM	JOIK	JOIK-TV	3	3	JOIK-DTV	Ishikari-Shiribeshi-Sorachi Subpref. (including Sapporo)
Hokkaidō	Hakodate (函館)	JOVK-FM	JOVK	JOVK-TV	4	3	JOVK-DTV	Oshima-Hiyama Subpref.
Hokkaidō	Asahikawa (旭川)	JOCG-FM	JOCG	JOCG-TV	9	3	JOCG-DTV	Kamikawa-Rumoi-Sōya Subpref.
Hokkaidō	Obihiro (帯広)	JOOG-FM	JOOG	JOOG-TV	4	3	JOOG-DTV	Tokachi Subpref.
Hokkaidō	Kushiro (釧路)	JOPG-FM	JOPG	JOPG-TV	9	3	JOPG-DTV	Kushiro-Nemuro Subpref.
Hokkaidō	Kitami (北見)	JOKP-FM	JOKP	JOKP-TV	3	3		Abashiri Subpref.
Hokkaidō	Muroran (室蘭)	JOIQ-FM	JOIQ	JOIQ-TV	9	3		Iburi-Hidaka Subpref.
Tōhoku	Aomori (青森)	JOTG-FM	JOTG	JOTG-TV	3	3	JOTG-DTV	Aomori
Tōhoku	Akita (秋田)	JOUK-FM	JOUK	JOUK-TV	9	1	JOUK-DTV	Akita
Tōhoku	Yamagata (山形)	JOJG-FM	JOJG	JOJG-TV	8	1	JOJG-DTV	Yamagata
Tōhoku	Morioka (盛岡)	JOQG-FM	JOQG	JOQG-TV	4	1	JOQG-DTV	Iwate
Tōhoku	**Sendai (仙台)**	JOHK-FM	JOHK	JOHK-TV	3	3	JOHK-DTV	Miyagi
Tōhoku	Fukushima (福島)	JOFP-FM	JOFP	JOFP-TV	9	1	JOFP-DTV	Fukushima
Kantō-Kōshin'etsu	**Tokyo (東京)**	JOAK-FM	JOAK	JOAK-TV (Tokyo)	1	1	JOAK-DTV (Tokyo)	Tokyo and surrounding areas (including Saitama, Chiba, and Yokohama)
Kantō-Kōshin'etsu	Yokohama (横浜)	JOGP-FM	--	JOAK-TV (Tokyo)	1	1	JOAK-DTV (Tokyo)	Kanagawa
Kantō-Kōshin'etsu	Chiba (千葉)	JOMP-FM	--	JOAK-TV (Tokyo)	1	1	JOAK-DTV (Tokyo)	Chiba
Kantō-Kōshin'etsu	Saitama (埼玉)	JOLP-FM	--	JOAK-TV (Tokyo)	1	1	JOAK-DTV (Tokyo)	Saitama
Kantō-Kōshin'etsu	Maebashi (前橋)	JOTP-FM	--	JOAK-TV (Tokyo)	1	1	JOTP-DTV	Gunma
Kantō-Kōshin'etsu	Utsunomiya (宇都宮)	JOBP-FM	--	JOAK-TV (Tokyo)	1	1	JOBP-DTV	Tochigi
Kantō-Kōshin'etsu	Mito (水戸)	JOEP-FM	--	JOAK-TV (Tokyo)	1	1	JOEP-DTV	Ibaraki
Kantō-Kōshin'etsu	Kōfu (甲府)	JOKG-FM	JOKG	JOKG-TV	1	1	JOKG-DTV	Yamanashi
Kantō-Kōshin'etsu	Nagano (長野)	JONK-FM	JONK	JONK-TV	2	1	JONK-DTV	Nagano
Kantō-Kōshin'etsu	Niigata (新潟)	JOQK-FM	JOQK	JOQK-TV	8	1	JOQK-DTV	Niigata
Tōkai-Hokuriku	Toyama (富山)	JOIG-FM	JOIG	JOIG-TV	3		JOIG-DTV	Toyama
Tōkai-Hokuriku	Kanazawa (金沢)	JOJK-FM	JOJK	JOJK-TV	4	1	JOJK-DTV	Ishikawa
Tōkai-Hokuriku	Fukui (福井)	JOFG-FM	JOFG	JOFG-TV	9	1	JOFG-DTV	Fukui
Tōkai-Hokuriku	Shizuoka (静岡)	JOPK-FM	JOPK	JOPK-TV	9	1	JOPK-DTV	Shizuoka
Tōkai-Hokuriku	**Nagoya (名古屋)**	JOCK-FM	JOCK	JOCK-TV	3	3	JOCK-DTV	Aichi
Tōkai-Hokuriku	Gifu (岐阜)	JOOP-FM	--	JOOP-TV	39/3	3	JOOP-DTV	Gifu
Tōkai-Hokuriku	Tsu (津)	JONP-FM	--	JONP-TV	31/3	3	JONP-DTV	Mie
Kansai	**Osaka (大阪)**	JOBK-FM	JOBK	JOBK-TV	2	1	JOBK-DTV	Osaka
Kansai	Kōbe (神戸)	JOPP-FM	--	JOPP-TV	28/2	1	JOPP-DTV	Hyōgo
Kansai	Kyoto (京都)	JOOK-FM	JOOK	JOOK-TV	32/2	1	JOOK-DTV	Kyoto
Kansai	Ōtsu (大津)	JOQP-FM	--	JOQP-TV	28	1	JOQP-DTV	Shiga
Kansai	Hikone (彦根) sub. of Ōtsu	--	JOQP	--	--	--	--	Shiga
Kansai	Nara (奈良)	JOUP-FM	--	JOUP-TV	51/2	1	JOUP-DTV	Nara
Kansai	Wakayama (和歌山)	JORP-FM	--	JORP-TV	32	1	JORP-DTV	Wakayama
Chūgoku	Tottori (鳥取)	JOLG-FM	JOLG	JOLG-TV	3	3	JOLG-DTV	Tottori
Chūgoku	Matsue (松江)	JOTK-FM	JOTK	JOTK-TV	6	3	JOTK-DTV	Shimane
Chūgoku	Okayama (岡山)	JOKK-FM	JOKK	JOKK-TV	5	1	JOKK-DTV	Okayama
Chūgoku	**Hiroshima (広島)**	JOFK-FM	JOFK	JOFK-TV	3	1	JOFK-DTV	Hiroshima
Chūgoku	Yamaguchi (山口)	JOUG-FM	JOUG	JOUG-TV	9	1	JOUG-DTV	Yamaguchi
Shikoku	Tokushima (徳島)	JOXK-FM	JOXK	JOXK-TV	3		JOXK-DTV	Tokushima
Shikoku	Takamatsu (高松)	JOHP-FM	JOHP	JOHP-TV	37	1	JOHP-DTV	Kagawa
Shikoku	**Matsuyama (松山)**	JOZK-FM	JOZK	JOZK-TV	6	1	JOZK-DTV	Ehime
Shikoku	Kōchi (高知)	JORK-FM	JORK	JORK-TV	4	1	JORK-DTV	Kōchi
Kyūshū-Okinawa	**Fukuoka (福岡)**	JOLK-FM	JOLK	JOLK-TV	3	3	JOLK-DTV	Nishifukuoka (includes Fukuoka and Kurume)
Kyūshū-Okinawa	Kitakyūshū (北九州)	JOSK-FM	JOSK	JOSK-TV	6	3	JOSK-DTV	Higashifukuoka/Nishiyamaguchi (includes Kitakyūshū and Shimonoseki)
Kyūshū-Okinawa	Saga (佐賀)	JOSP-FM	JOSP	JOSP-TV	38	1	JOSP-DTV	Saga
Kyūshū-Okinawa	Nagasaki (長崎)	JOAG-FM	JOAG	JOAG-TV	3	1	JOAG-DTV	Nagasaki
Kyūshū-Okinawa	Kumamoto (熊本)	JOGK-FM	JOGK	JOGK-TV	9	1	JOGK-DTV	Kumamoto
Kyūshū-Okinawa	Ōita (大分)	JOIP-FM	JOIP	JOIP-TV	3	1	JOIP-DTV	Ōita
Kyūshū-Okinawa	Miyazaki (宮崎)	JOMG-FM	JOMG	JOMG-TV	8	1	JOMG-DTV	Miyazaki
Kyūshū-Okinawa	Kagoshima (鹿児島)	JOHG-FM	JOHG	JOHG-TV	3	3	JOHG-DTV	Kagoshima
Kyūshū-Okinawa	Okinawa (沖縄)	JOAP-FM	JOAP	JOAP-TV	2	1	JOAP-DTV	Okinawa (including Naha)

== JIB TV ==
JIB TV (Japan International Broadcasting Inc.) is a broadcasting company established in April 2008. Its purpose is to disseminate information and knowledge of Japanese and Asian culture, and as a counterweight to channels such as CNN International and BBC World. JIB is also responsible for the distribution of NHK's international services NHK World-Japan and NHK World Premium.

JIB produces English-language programs about Japan and Asia for an international audience. The programs will be shown all over the world through the English channel NHK World-Japan from the Japanese public service broadcaster NHK. JIB began airing such programs in February 2009, starting with Japan in the First Person, a co-production of the five major "Tokyo-area" commercial TV stations.

JIB's main shareholder is NHK, while other shareholders include Microsoft Japan, Fuji Media Holdings, Japanese bank Mizuho. Operations are financed for the most part by the Japanese TV license payers but also by external sponsors and advertisers.

In order to release capital NHK moved money from radio to TV. One consequence was that the Swedish, German and Italian departments of foreign channel Radio Japan were shut down in autumn 2007.
