= 1967 in Japanese television =

Events in 1967 in Japanese television.

== Events ==
- October 31: The state funeral of former Prime Minister Shigeru Yoshida (who died October 20) is held at the Nippon Budokan (Kitanomaru, Chiyoda Ward) in Tokyo, and special programs are organized on NHK and commercial TV stations. The state funeral was broadcast live on NHK General and other networks, and on Fuji Television, all programs on that day were broadcast without commercials.
- November 1: The Ministry of Posts and Telecommunications relicenses 1,640 TV stations and grants preliminary licenses to 15 new UHF stations and 16 stations (see table below for details). The Radio Law requires general program stations to program at least 30% of their programs on educational and cultural topics . On this day, Sapporo Television, Yomiuri Television, and Mainichi Broadcasting changed from quasi-educational stations to general stations.

=== First tranche of UHF television stations in Japan ===
Due to a major revision to the "Television Broadcasting Frequency Allocation Plan" by the Ministry of Posts and Telecommunications at the time, in addition to UHF channels 45 to 62, which were previously used only by relay stations, channel 33 was used for parent stations. Channel 44 was newly opened for use (October 13). As a result, preliminary licenses for new UHF stations will be granted under the UHF 1st Channel Plan. At this time, commercial television stations that opened in the first tranche had H as the last letter of their callsign.

The dates and main stations where preliminary licenses were granted are as follows If relocated within the same city, ward, town or village, the description of the current location will be omitted. All commercial television stations that gained their license at the time, had a callsign ending with the letter H (the second tranche followed with the letter I) with the exception of KBS Kyoto, which applied with the callsign of its radio station.

Stations that received preliminary licenses on November 1 (all commercial broadcasters)
Coverage area	Callsign	Company name at time of issuing the license	Location	Remarks
Hokkaido	JOHH-TV	Hokkaido Television Broadcasting Co., Ltd. (北海道テレビ放送株式会社)	Toyohira Ward, Sapporo City	Current location: Chuo District, Tongshi
Nagano Prefecture	JOLH-TV	K. K. Nagano Broadcasting (株式会社長野放送)	Nagano City	
Niigata Prefecture	JONH-TV	K. K. Niigata Sogo Television (株式会社新潟総合テレビ)	Chuo Ward, Niigata City	At the time, the broadcasting facilities were located in Nagaoka, Niigata
Toyama Prefecture	JOTH-TV	Toyama Television Broadcasting Co. Ltd. (富山テレビ放送株式会社)	Toyama	
Ishikawa Prefecture	JOIH-TV	Ishikawa Television Broadcasting Co. Ltd. (石川テレビ放送株式会社)	Kanazawa	
Shizuoka Prefecture	JOQH-TV	K. K. Shizuoka UHF Television (株式会社静岡ユー・エッチ・エフテレビ)	Suruga Ward, Shizuoka (city)	Name changed to TV Shizuoka before signing on.
Shizuoka Prefecture	JORH-TV	K. K. Shizuoka UHF Television (株式会社静岡ユー・エッチ・エフテレビ)	Suruga Ward, Shizuoka (city)	Same as above, issued to the Hamamatsu station
Tokai wide area	JOCH-TV	Chūkyō UHF Television Broadcasting(中京ユー・エッチ・エフ・テレビ放送株式会社))	Showa Ward, Nagoya, Aichi Prefecture	Current company name: Chukyo Television Broadcasting Co., Ltd.
Gifu Prefecture	JOZF-TV	K. K. Radio Gifu (株式会社ラジオ岐阜)	Gifu City	Name changed to Gifu Broadcasting before the TV station signed on. First UHF television station in Japan.
Mie Prefecture	JOMH-TV	Mie Radio Broadcasting Co. Ltd. (三重電波放送株式会社)	Tsu City	Name changed to Mie Television Broadcasting before signing on.
Kyoto Prefecture	JOBR-TV	Kinki Broadcasting Co. Ltd. (株式会社近畿放送)	Nakagyo Ward, Kyoto	Now Kyoto Broadcasting.
Hyogo Prefecture	JOUH-TV	Hyogo Television Broadcasting Co. Ltd. (兵庫テレビ放送株式会社)	Nagata Ward, Kobe City	Name changed to Sun Television before signing on.
Okayama Prefecture	JOOH-TV	Okayama Broadcasting Co. Ltd. (岡山放送株式会社)	Kita Ward, Okayama City	
Kagawa Prefecture	JOVH-TV	K. K. New Japan Broadcasting (株式会社新日本放送)	Takamatsu City	Name changed to Setonaikai Broadcasting before signing on. The station was not affiliated with the current Mainichi Broadcasting System which used this name in the 1950s.
Saga Prefecture	JOSH-TV	Saga Broadcasting Co. Ltd. (佐賀放送株式会社)	Saga City	Name changed to Saga Television Station before signing on.
Kagoshima Prefecture	JOKH-TV	Kagoshima Television Station (鹿児島テレビ放送株式会社)	Kagoshima City	

Stations that received preliminary licenses on November 14
Coverage area	Callsign	Business format	Company name at time of issuing the license	Location	Remarks
Tokushima Prefecture	JOXB-TV	NHK	NHK Tokushima Educational Television	Tokushima City	Practical use by reducing the power of the experimental station
Kagawa Prefecture	JOHP-TV	NHK	NHK Takamatsu General Television	Takamatsu City	
Kagawa Prefecture	JOHD-TV	NHK	NHK Takamatsu Educational Television	Takamatsu City	
Saga Prefecture	JOSP-TV	NHK	NHK Saga General Television	Saga City	
Saga Prefecture	JOSD-TV	NHK	NHK Saga Educational Television	Saga City	
Nagasaki Prefecture	JOWH-TV	Commercial	K. K. Television Nagasaki (テレビ長崎)	Nagasaki City	
Kumamoto Prefecture	JOZH-TV	Commercial	Kumamoto Central Television Co. Ltd. (熊本中央テレビ株式会社)	Temporary office: Chuo Ward, Kumamoto City	Name changed to TV Kumamoto before signing on.

== Debuts ==
Show	Station	Premiere Date	Genre	Original Run
Akakage	Kansai TV	April 5	Tokusatsu	April 5, 1967 – March 27, 1968
Captain Ultra	TBS	April 16	Tokusatsu	April 16, 1967 – September 24, 1967
Chibikko Kaiju Yadamon	Fuji TV	October 2	Anime	October 2, 1967 – March 25, 1968
Giant Robo	NET	October 11	Tokusatsu	October 11, 1967 – April 1, 1968
Goku no Daiboken	Fuji TV	January 7	Anime	January 7, 1967 – September 30, 1967
Kaiju Ouji	Fuji TV	October 2	Tokusatsu	October 2, 1967 – March 25, 1968
Mach GoGoGo	Fuji TV	April 2	Anime	April 2, 1967 - March 31, 1968
Ōgon Bat	Yomimuri TV	April 1	Anime	April 1, 1967 – March 23, 1968
Oraa Guzura Dado	Fuji TV	October 7	Anime	October 7, 1967 – September 25, 1968
Perman	TBS	April 2	Anime	April 2, 1967 - April 14, 1968
Ribbon no Kishi	Fuji TV	April 2	Anime	April 2, 1967 – April 7, 1968
Ultraseven	TBS	October 1	Tokusatsu	October 1, 1967 – September 8, 1968
kometto-san	TBS	July 3	Tokusatsu	July 3, 1967 - December 30, 1968

== Ongoing shows ==
- Music Fair, music (1964–present)
- Hyokkori Hyō Tanjima, anime (1964-1969)

== Endings ==
Show	Station	Ending Date	Genre	Original Run
Ambassador Magma	Fuji TV	September 25	Tokusatsu	July 4, 1966 – September 25, 1967
Captain Ultra	TBS	September 24	Tokusatsu	April 16, 1967 – September 24, 1967
Goku no Daiboken	Fuji TV	September 30	Anime	January 7, 1967 – September 30, 1967
New Jungle Emperor: Go Ahead Leo!	Fuji TV	March 29	Anime	October 5, 1966 – March 29, 1967
Obake no Q-tarō	TBS	August 29	Anime	August 29, 1965 – June 28, 1967
Ultraman	TBS	April 9	Tokusatsu	July 17, 1966 – April 9, 1967

== See also ==
- 1967 in anime
- 1967 in Japan
- List of Japanese films of 1967
