= NHK Yamagata Broadcasting Station =

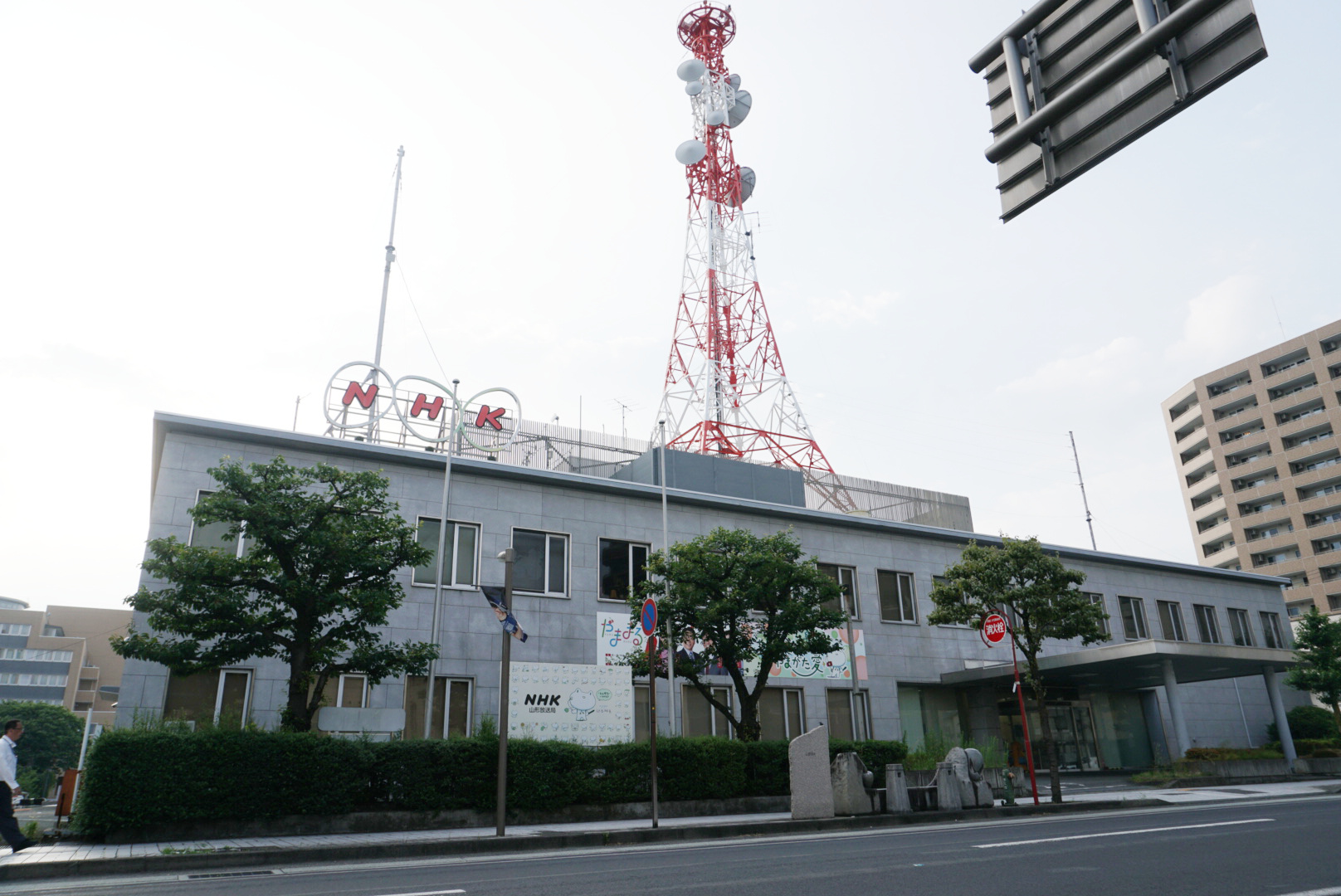
NHK Yamagata Broadcasting Hall

The NHK Yamagata Broadcasting Station (NHK山形放送局, NHK Yamagata Hōsō Kyoku) is a unit of the NHK that oversees terrestrial broadcasting in Yamagata Prefecture. The station uses the JOJG and JOJC calls.

== History ==
It started broadcasting on November 30, 1936; JOJC followed on December 1, 1948. JOJG-TV started broadcasting on December 19, 1959, JOJC-TV followed on November 1, 1962.

On June 1, 1964, JOJG-FM started test broadcasts; stereo programs followed this route: the signal originated in Sendai, which was then transported to Fukushima and, from there, relayed to Yamagata. Color broadcasts started on both JOJG-TV and JOJC-TV on March 20, 1966, when NHK Educational TV converted most of its stations. In early October 1971, local news items began to be shot on color film.

In 1977, work to convert local operations to stereo started. Full-time stereo broadcasting on JOJG-FM began on February 28, 1982. Television stereo broadcasts began on JOJG-TV on February 21, 1986, while JOJC-TV followed on March 21, 1991.

Local programming was added to NHK+ on June 5, 2023, followed by its 8:45pm newscast on September 16, 2025, alongside other local stations.

== 2017 scandal ==
On February 6, 2017, a male reporter working at NHK Yamagata's office in Sakata by the prefectural police for rape, aggression and invasion of private property The suspect claimed to have done the same in Kofu before. The Yamagata Public Prosecutors Office presented accusations against him at the Yamagata District Court on February 27. On March 15, the police apprehended him again in correlation to the incident in Kofu. On March 30, NHK president Ryoichi Ueda decided to voluntarily open 30% of his salary for three months, while vice-president Mitsuru Domoto, executive director Yukinori Kida and director Hiroshi Araki did the same but only with 10%.
