= NHK Takamatsu Broadcasting Station =

Unit of the Japan Broadcasting Corporation

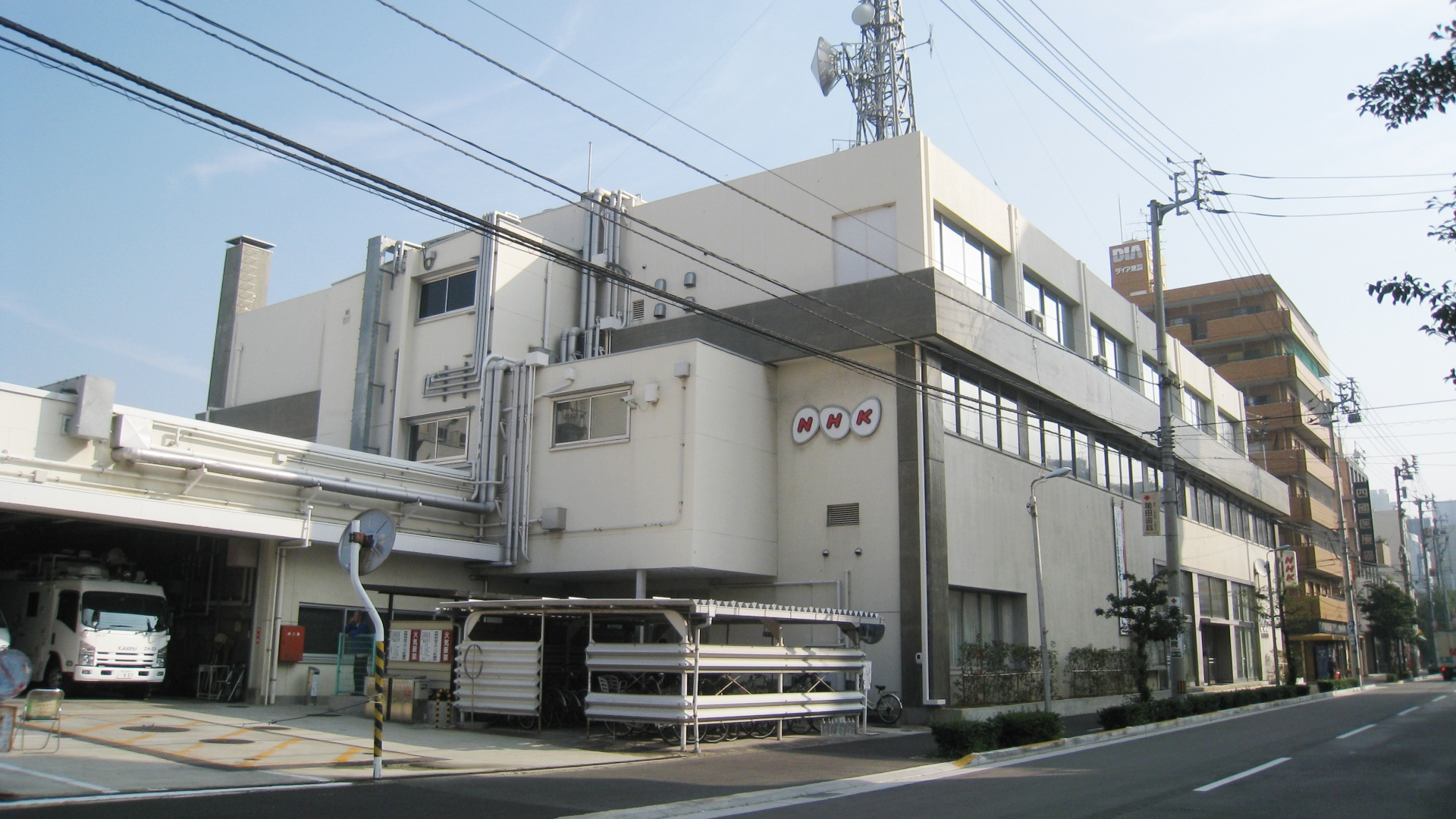
Head office

The NHK Takamatsu Broadcasting Station (NHK高松放送局, NHK Takamatsu Hōsō Kyoku) is a unit of the NHK that oversees terrestrial broadcasting in Kagawa Prefecture.

== History ==
Although Takamatsu had an office since 1934, it wasn't until May 17, 1944, that NHK started broadcasting locally. The formal inauguration wasn't held until September 7, 1945 (call sign JOHP). Radio 2 followed on June 29, 1958 (call sign JOHD).

Due to the geographic characteristics of Kagawa Prefecture, viewers could easily receive television signals from Mount Kinko in Okayama. Both NHK General TV and NHK Educational TV started broadcasting locally on March 22, 1969 (JOHP-TV and JOHD-TV) on the UHF band. Until that date, Kagawa depended on the Okayama station.

On May 22, 2023, local programs were added to the NHK+ platform.

The station has a helicopter base, a feature the head station for Shikoku lacks.

== Radio ==
JOHP broadcasts on 1368 kHz with output of 5 kW from a transmitter located at Matsunawa. It has a directional relay on 1584 kHz with an output of 100 watts from Kanonji. JOHD broadcasts on 1035 kHz with an output of 1 kW. JOHP-FM broadcasts on 86.0 FM with an output of 1 kW from a transmitter located in Goshikidai.

== Controversies ==
In March 2019, the station received corrective measures from the Takamatsu Inspection Office of Working Norms for not adequately paying the license fees to staff.
