= NHK Akita Broadcasting Station =

Public broadcaster in Akita, Japan

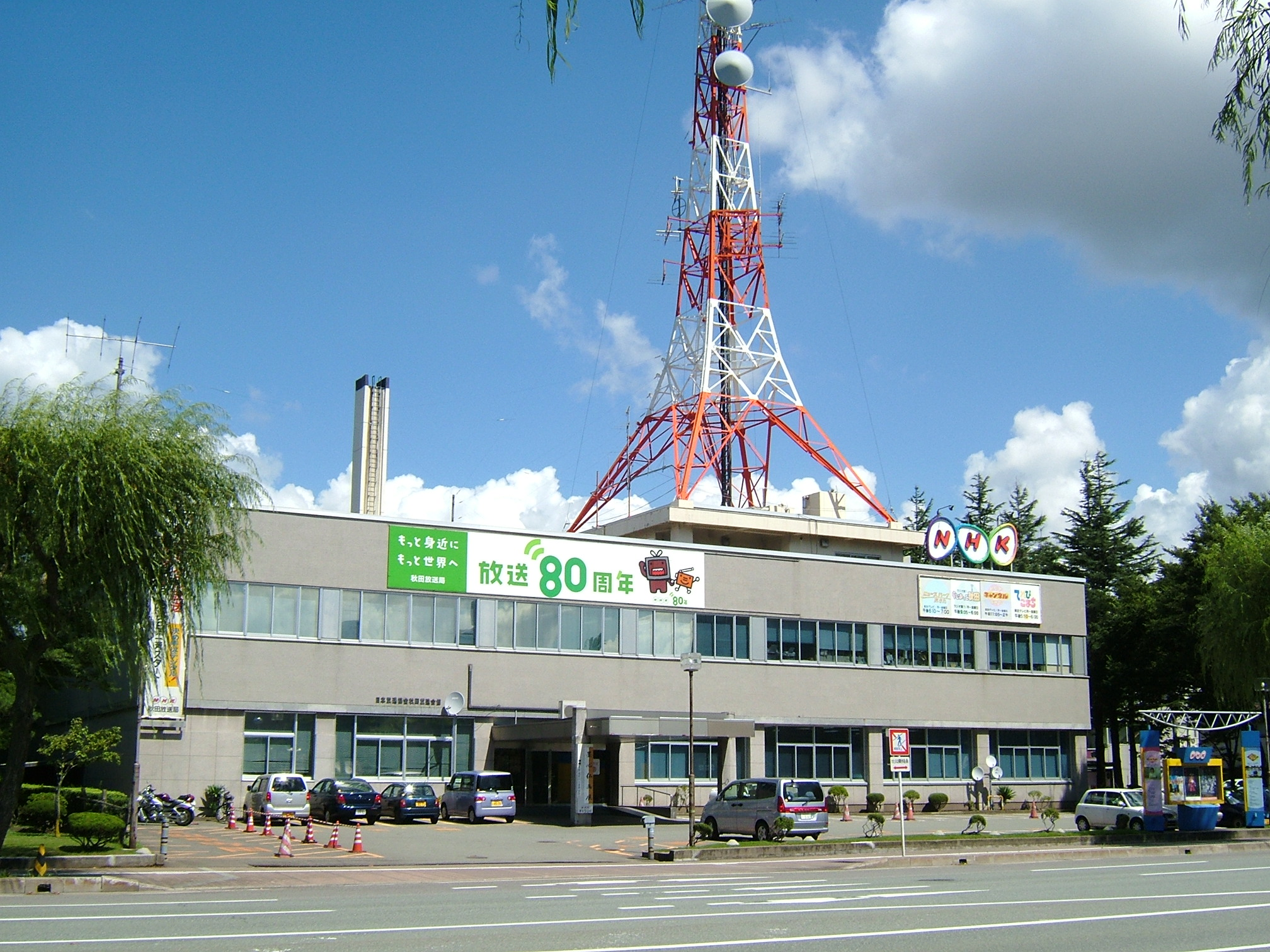
This is the former NHK Akita Broadcasting Station building.

The NHK Akita Broadcasting Station (NHK秋田放送局, NHK Akita Hōsō Kyoku) is a unit of the NHK that oversees terrestrial broadcasting in Akita Prefecture.

== History ==
The Akita station received its license on December 21, 1931 (callsign JOUK, 645kc, output 300W) and started broadcasting in February 1932. Radio 2 (JOUB, 1080kc, output 500W) followed on September 15, 1946. On July 1, 1951, JOUK moved to 820kc and JOUB to 1470kc.

On December 25, 1959, television broadcasts started while broadcasts of the second network started on October 13, 1962.

On June 1, 1964, it started experimental FM broadcasts (JOUK-FMX), 86,7 Mc, output 3kW. Initially the stereo broadcasts were relayed from Tokyo, but from February 24, 1965, it was sent in from Sendai instead. Both TV channels started color broadcasts on March 20, 1966. In 1970, local news items began to be shot on color film.

On April 1, 1971, the Akita Radio 2 station started broadcasting with a larger output of 500kW, in order to combat loss of signal in northern Japan. In 1977, work to convert local operations to stereo started. Following changes to the AM frequency plan in 1978, JOUK moved to 1503kHz and JOUB to 774kHz. The introduction of PCM lines for FM broadcasting led to the end of the dependence on the Sendai station for stereo broadcasting in 1980. Television stereo broadcasts began on NHK General TV (JOUK-TV) on August 8, 1985, while JOUB-TV followed on March 21, 1991.

On June 5, 2023, NHK+ added programming from Akita, including the evening news bulletin News Komachi (ニュースこまち).
