= Tokushima (disambiguation) =

Tokushima may refer to:

- Tokushima Prefecture, a prefecture in western Japan
- Tokushima, Tokushima, the capital city of Tokushima Prefecture
- Tokushima at-large district, a former constituency of the House of Councillors in the Diet of Japan
- NHK Tokushima Broadcasting Station
