= NHK Kitami Broadcasting Station =

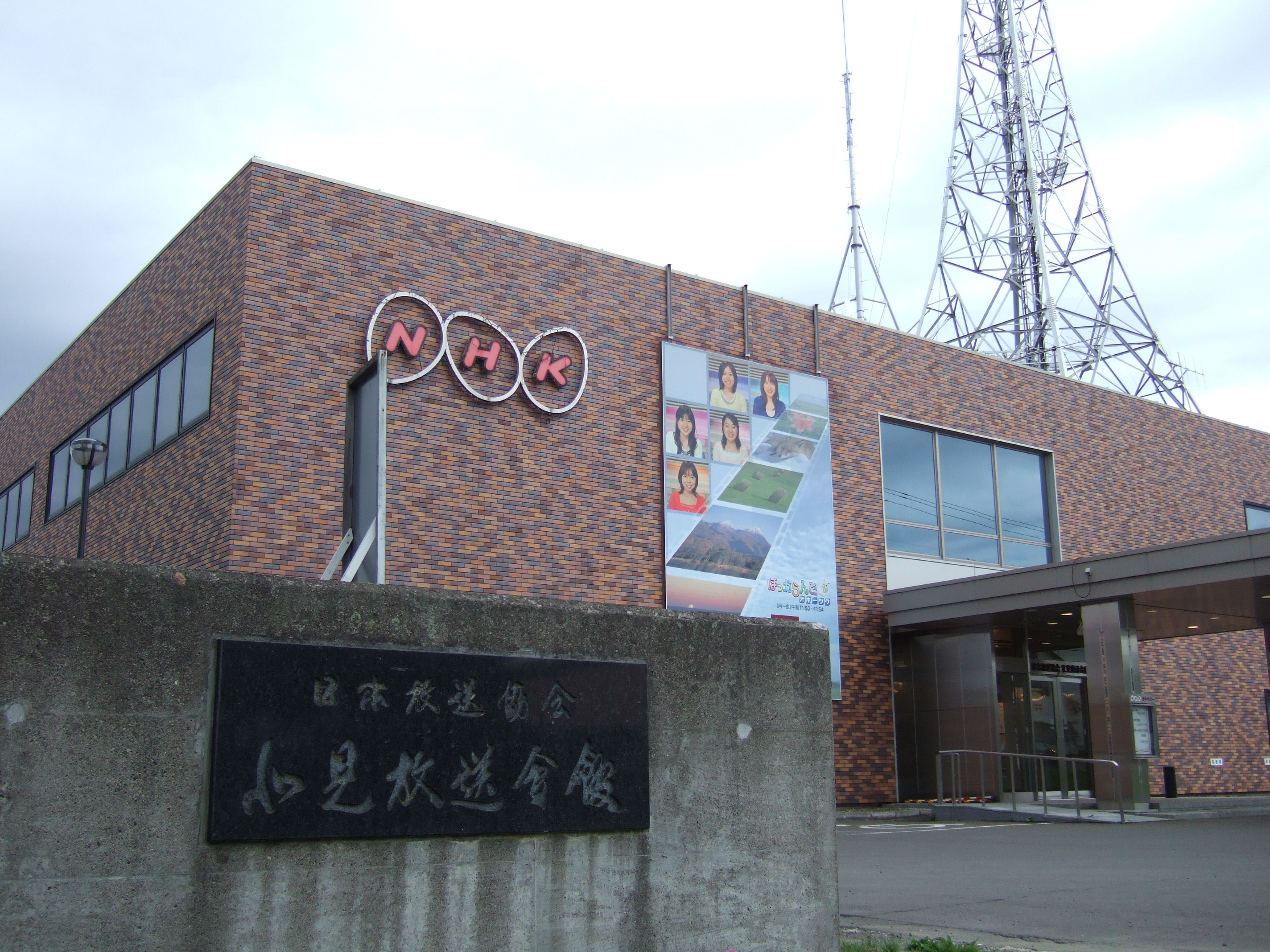
NHK Kitami Broadcasting Station

The NHK Kitami Broadcasting Station (NHK北見放送局, NHK Kitami Hōsō Kyoku) is a unit of the NHK that oversees terrestrial broadcasting in northern Hokkaido Prefecture, based in Kitami. Since 2022, it is subordinate to the NHK Asahikawa Broadcasting Station.

== History ==
The station started broadcasting on January 1, 1942, call sign JOKP. Initially, the station broadcast from temporary premises at Rokujo Higashi 2-chome, before moving to Hokutocho 2-chome where it formally opened in 1946. The first program recorded outside its facilities was in front of Kitami Station in 1948, talking about cheaper coal, housing and medical issues.

The Abashiri radio station was completed in 1951. In 1955, the NHK Kitami-Abashiri Ekiden race was held for 50 years in a row until 2004. NHK General Television (JOKP-TV) started broadcasting in 1961, followed by color broadcasting in 1965. In 1967, the current Kitami Broadcasting Center was built. The NHK Trophy Curling Championship began in 1981 and was still held as late as 2022. Teams from 10 municipalities in Hokkaido participated in the first tournament. Analog television signals (JOKP-TV and JOKD-TV) were shut down in 2011.

Beginning fiscal 2022, it became subordinate to the Asahikawa station forming the North Hokkaido and Okhotsk Sea unit of NHK's Hokkaido branch. Some of the Kitami station's departments shut down in fiscal 2023, causing some work to be done from Sapporo.
