= NHK Kagoshima Broadcasting Station =

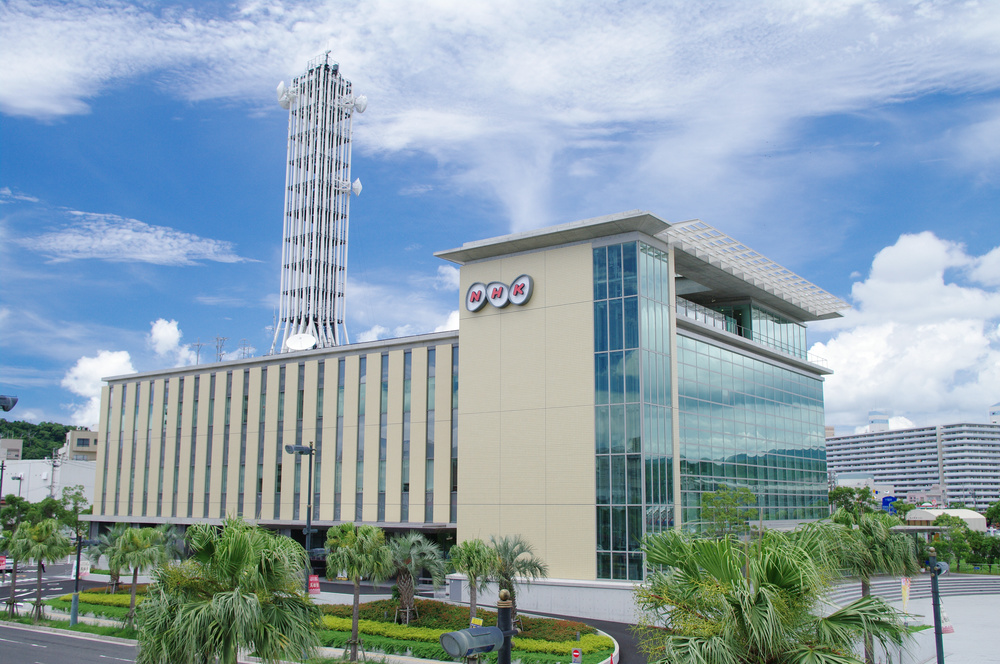
Head office

The NHK Kagoshima Broadcasting Station (NHK鹿児島放送局, NHK Kagoshima Hōsō Kyoku) is a unit of the NHK that oversees terrestrial broadcasting in Kagoshima Prefecture.

== History ==
Radio station JOHG started broadcasting on October 26, 1935. Television broadcasts started on February 22, 1958 (JOHG-TV, JOHC-TV started on April 8, 1962).

On December 15, 1961, it installed a relay station at Naze, Amami Ōshima, the first of its kind to deliver radio signals to the remote island areas. Television reception at Naze started on June 10, 1963 for General TV, while Educational TV relays to the island started on November 1.

Color broadcasts for both JOHG-TV and JOHC-TV began on March 20, 1966, but were initially limited to the mainland area of the prefecture. Color signals were made available to Amami on May 15, 1972. Work to convert the local facilities to accommodate stereo broadcasting were concluded in 1976. At an unknown date during fiscal 1983, an FM stereo line between Kagoshima and Naze was established, bringing stereo audio to the remote islands.. JOHG-TV was converted to stereo on July 20, 1984. NHK+ added Kagoshima programming on May 15, 2023.

For its 90th anniversary, NHK Kagoshima used the slogan "Aimo, koimo", which in the local dialect means "this and that". The logo is represented by a face, where the eyes are the 90.
