= NHK Osaka Broadcasting Station =

Coordinates: 34°40′57.6″N 135°31′12.4″E

NHK Osaka Television (JOBK-DTV)
Osaka Prefecture; Japan
- City: Osaka
- Channels: Digital: 24 (UHF); Virtual: 1

Programming
- Affiliations: NHK General TV

Ownership
- Owner: NHK (Japan Broadcasting Corporation)

History
- First air date: April 1, 1954
- Former call signs: JOBK-TV (1954—2011)
- Former channel numbers: Analog: 4 (VHF, 1954–1958); 2 (VHF, 1958–2011)

Technical information
- Licensing authority: MIC

NHK Osaka Educational Television (JOBB-DTV)
Kansai region; Japan
- City: Osaka
- Channels: Digital: 13 (UHF); Virtual: 2

Programming
- Affiliations: NHK Educational TV

Ownership
- Owner: NHK (Japan Broadcasting Corporation)

History
- First air date: April 1, 1959
- Former call signs: JOBB-TV (1959–2011)
- Former channel numbers: Analog: 12 (VHF, 1959–2011)

Technical information
- Licensing authority: MIC

The NHK Osaka Broadcasting Station (NHK大阪放送局, NHK Osaka Hoso Kyoku) is a unit of the NHK that oversees terrestrial broadcasting in both Osaka Prefecture and five other prefectures of the Kansai region. It is also the main station under the jurisdiction of NHK's Kansai region.

== Overview ==
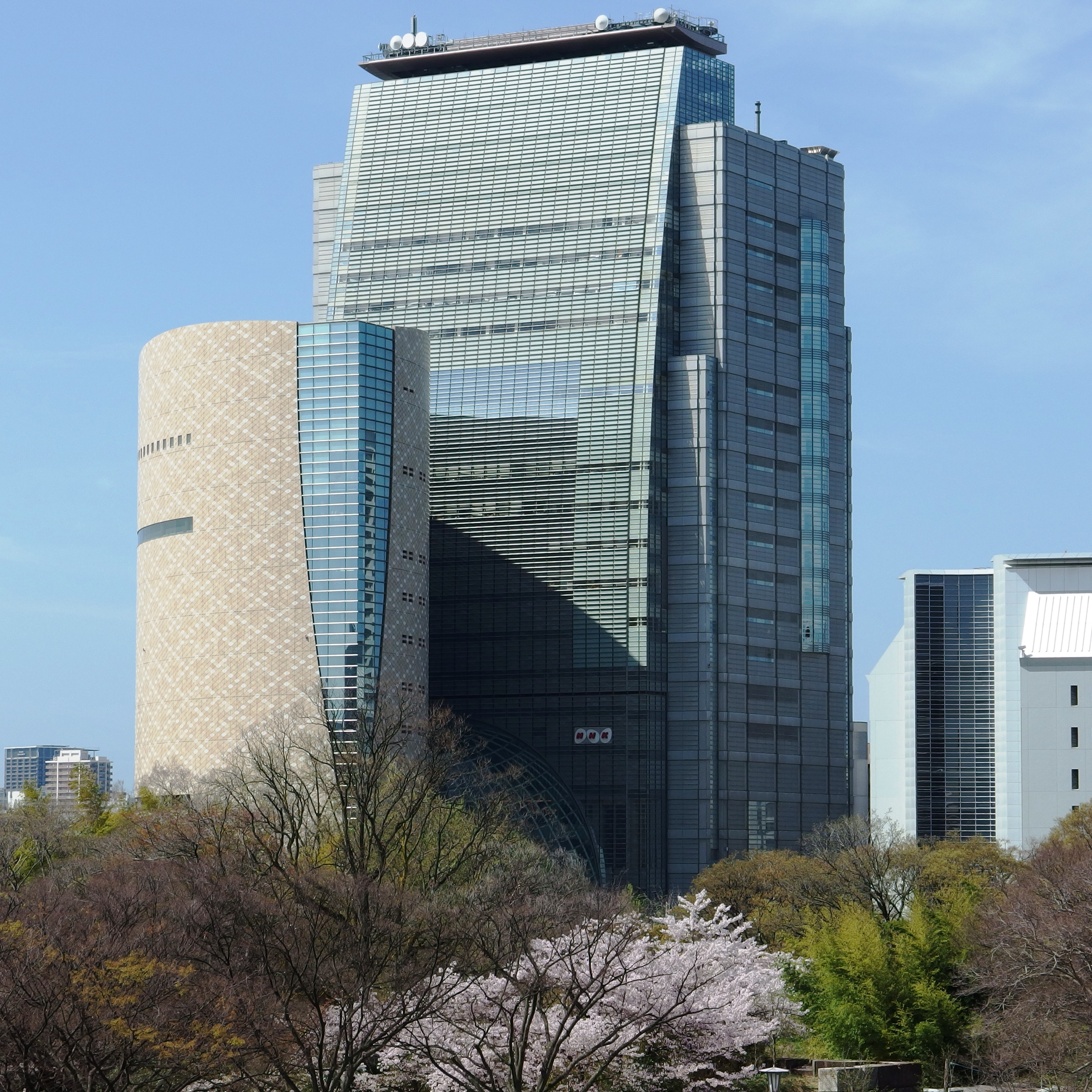
NHK Osaka in 2015

The Osaka station is NHK's base station in the Kinki region. Although it can be considered a second NHK broadcasting center due to its historical background and scale, since NHK is a single nationwide organization, Osaka Broadcasting Station is not called a quasi-key station.

Programs common to the Kinki region of Osaka, Kyoto, Hyogo, Shiga, Nara, and Wakayama prefectures (“jurisdictional programs”), local programs from the Osaka station, and the signature program “Serial TV Novel” are broadcast approximately every six months (the Osaka station is in charge of one asadora in one half of the year and the Tokyo station in charge of the other). NHK Osaka has also produced many programs for national broadcast, including those produced in Japan. It also hosts the NHK Kamigata Manzai Contest (as a general rule, broadcast live on the second Friday of March every year), which can be said to be one of the statuses of comedians in Western Japan.

In November 2001, the new Osaka Broadcasting Hall (with studios, NHK Osaka Hall, and Osaka Museum of History) opened on the site of the former Osaka City Central Gymnasium across Kamimachisuji from the former Osaka Broadcasting Hall. It is sometimes called "BK" from the call sign JOBK, and the name "BK" is also used at its own station (BK Plaza, etc. described below).

General TV's programming is characterized by the fact that it is replaced with Kansai local (independent programming) more frequently in all time slots than broadcast stations in other regions.

In the event that the NHK Broadcasting Center (Shibuya, Tokyo) becomes inoperable due to damage caused by a direct earthquake, problems with broadcasting equipment, terrorism, or other emergencies, all TV and radio channels can be transmitted at the Osaka Broadcasting Station as an alternative. The roof is equipped with equipment for transmitting data to satellites. This has never been used except for test broadcasts. Furthermore, in order to enable Osaka to take over the role of the NHK Broadcasting Center in Shibuya, Tokyo, in the unlikely event of an emergency, the station will simultaneously distribute program operation and production systems, weather cameras, safety information, and television (NHK Plus). There are also backup systems in place for various systems such as the two internet radio services (NHK Net Radio Rajiru★Rajiru and radiko), and ensures that NHK, which is responsible for public broadcasting, has a backup system. As part of this, it was announced that from October 2020, Hideo Kado, the former Osaka Broadcasting Bureau Chief and NHK Director at the time, was reinstated as the Osaka Broadcasting Bureau Chief, concurrently serving as a director, and will be stationed in Osaka.

On April 12, 2022, it was announced in the executive personnel change dated 25th of the same month that Hideo Kado would step down as director to take responsibility for the scandal caused by the Osaka station, and Hideo Koike would be appointed as his successor.

On April 11, 2023, it was announced in the executive personnel change dated 25th of the same month that Hideo Koike would step down as director due to a change in responsibilities, and that Rie Hayashi, who was the media general director, would take over as his successor.

== History ==
It was set up on February 28, 1925, as an incorporated association. Test broadcasts started on May 10 the same year from the roof of the Mitsukoshi Kimono Store's Osaka branch, the broadcasts became regular on June 1.

On August 20, 1926, the three existing radio stations (Tokyo, Nagoya and Osaka) were merged, laying ground for the current NHK. Broadcasting moved to a definitive location on December 1, from Uehonmachi Hall. The station broadcast the first radio calisthenics broadcast on August 1, 1928, before the rest of the country. Radio 2 broadcasts started on June 26, 1933.

After the war, experimental television broadcasts started on June 25, 1951, on VHF and a radio station in Sakai started on November 3, 1951. Regular experimental television broadcasts began in April 1952, in 1953 it broadcast live baseball matches to the Nagoya and Tokyo stations by microwave link. The regular television broadcasts started on March 1, 1954, at 8am on channel 4, the same frequency used by the experimental service. A special program was broadcast at 2pm, with a congratulatory message from local officials, alongside those in Nagoya, whose station started in the same day.

Experimental FM broadcasts started on February 20, 1958, from Mount Ikoma (JOBK-FMX, 88.1Mc, 1 kW, output increased to 10kW on June 15, 1961). Following the return of VHF channels 1 and 2 used for radar by the US military, the station moved to channel 2 on December 1, 1958. The vacant channel 4 frequency was taken by the Mainichi Broadcasting System (still New Japan Broadcasting until June 1959), whose television broadcasts started on March 1, 1959. NHK Educational Television started broadcasting in Osaka on April 1, 1959, the second in the network.

Color TV broadcasts started on the same day as Tokyo (September 10, 1960). At first, the color broadcast lines from Tokyo were not in place, so the color tapes and films sent from Tokyo were broadcast as they were (by the way, the first color broadcast on NHK Osaka was broadcast on General TV). It was a color VTR broadcast of the program to commemorate the start of color broadcasting, Nagauta - Kyoto Kanko Musume Dojoji.

The Nippon Telegraph and Telephone Public Corporation (currently NTT) upgraded the microwave link for TV stations between Tokyo and Osaka on June 10, 1962, and provisional operation of color TV transmission began (the following month). As a result, TV programs from Tokyo (both general and educational) will begin broadcasting via the same line, and complete simultaneous color broadcasting of Tokyo and Osaka will be realized (this will allow for simultaneous color broadcasting in Tokyo and Osaka) and ended sending videotapes and films of the programs from Tokyo.

The new Osaka Broadcasting Hall was completed on November 12, 1963.

On February 4, 1964, NHK Osaka FM stereo broadcasting begins. (At that time, stereo lines for FM broadcasting had not been put into practical use, so before stereo broadcasting was put into practical use on October 1, 1978, programs were packaged and sent from Tokyo in advance, as the tape was sent and broadcast). The first locally produced asadora, s

On February 13, 1969, NHK Osaka moved its radio transmitters from Sakai to Mihara (Radio 1) and Habikino (Radio 2). At the same time, the power of the Radio 2 broadcast was increased from 100kW to 300kW, and operation began as the first unmanned high-power broadcasting station. On March 1, NHK Osaka commenced its FM broadcasting. On December 21, NHK Osaka General TV begins experimental broadcasting simultaneously with Tokyo of bilingual audio multiplex broadcasting.

On October 1, 1990, NHK Osaka Educational TV started its audio multiplex broadcasting.

During Kobe earthquake that occurred on January 17, 1995, and for a while after that day, NHK Osaka continued to broadcast special news programs from Tokyo, interspersed with broadcasts from the authorities.

On November 13, 2001, NHK Osaka moved to its current Osaka Broadcasting Hall (with studios, NHK Osaka Hall, and Osaka Museum of History), situated on the site of the former Osaka City Central Gymnasium across Kamimachisuji from the former Osaka Broadcasting Hall.

== See also ==
- NHK Osaka Hall
- List of NHK broadcasting stations
