= NHK One =

Japanese video streaming service

- Broadcast area: Japan
- Headquarters: Tokyo, Japan

Programming
- Language: Japanese

Ownership
- Owner: NHK

History
- Launched: October 1, 2025
- Replaced: NHK+

NHK One (stylized as NHK ONE) is NHK's official streaming service. It provides simulcasts and already-carried programs carried by the corporation's radio and television networks.

== Background ==
NHK One was announced in June 2025 as the replacement service to NHK+ with an October 1 launch date. The service was created from the merger of NHK's existing apps (NHK+, For School, News and Bosai) as well as Rajiru Rajiru and Gokaku, a language app. The name was selected from among approximately 760 suggestions from NHK staff.

The service's provisional promotional mascot was Wanwan, from Inai Inai Baa!, with the pre-launch aim of making the service accessible for families. Days ahead of the launch of the new service, a specific mascot was created, NHK One Domo-kun, a variation of its corporate mascot.

On October 1, 2025, users were advised to reinstall the previous apps (NHK+, News and Bosai, For School) to carry the new NHK ONE update.

The service started using fee contracts from November 18, 2025, in order to combat illegal use of the service. By October 13, 1.68 million users had applied for their contracts.

On March 30, 2026, coinciding with the restructuring of NHK's radio offer, the NHK One brand was attached to Radiru Radiru.

== Criticism ==
=== Criticism on content restrictions ===
As internet access became mandatory, restrictions were placed on access to NHK’s online content. In the lead-up to the launch of NHK One, the broadcaster gradually discontinued several services, including NHK News Web, its video offerings on YouTube, the NHK Archives Portal and their respective smartphone apps. The decision to shut down these services drew criticism from users and industry observers.

=== Problems with verification e-mails ===
Immediately after the opening of the new NHK One service at 12 am on October 1, 2025, some users had problems as they did not receive the verification e-mails to join the service, or with the verification code not being recognized by the system.

NHK issued apologies on its website and several shows, justifying the issue on the large number of verification e-mails being labelled as spam by Google, especially among users of its e-mail service Gmail.

The issue was solved at around 12 pm on October 2.
