= NHK Osaka Hall =

Building in Osaka, Japan

Coordinates: 34°40′58″N 135°31′12″E

- BK Hall
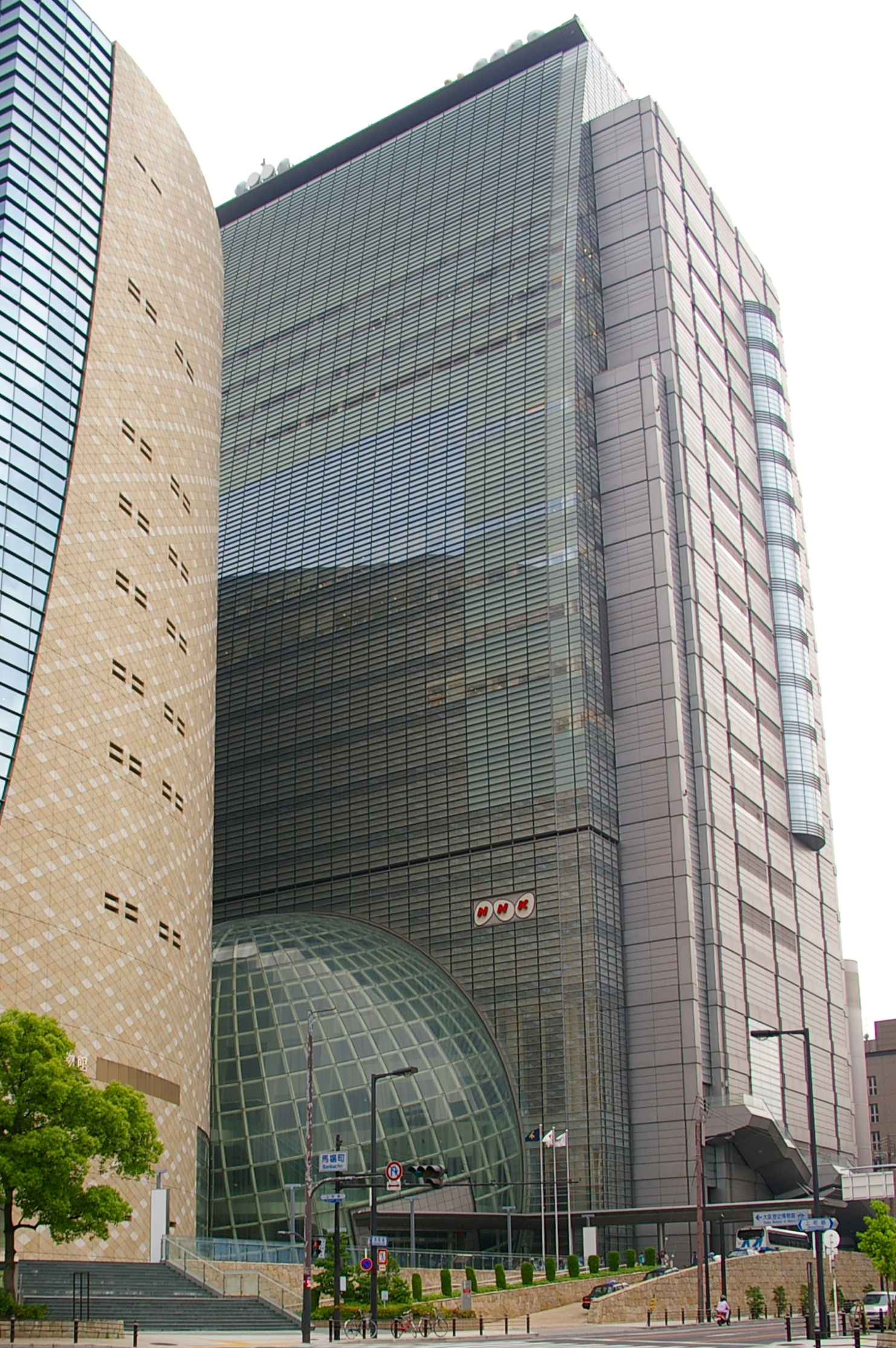
- Interactive map of NHK Osaka Hall
- Location: Chūō-ku, Osaka, Japan
- Owner: NHK Planet Kinki
- Seating type: Reserved
- Capacity: 1,417
- Type: concert hall

Construction
- Built: 2001
- Opened: 3 November 2001

Website
- nhk-osakahall.jp

NHK Hall is a part of the NHK Osaka, located in Otemae, Chūō-ku, Osaka, Japan. Its address is 4-1-20, Chūō-ku, Osaka, 540-8501. This facility has a capacity of 1,417 seats.

== See also ==
- NHK Hall
