= NHK Okayama Broadcasting Station =

Media broadcasting station in Japan

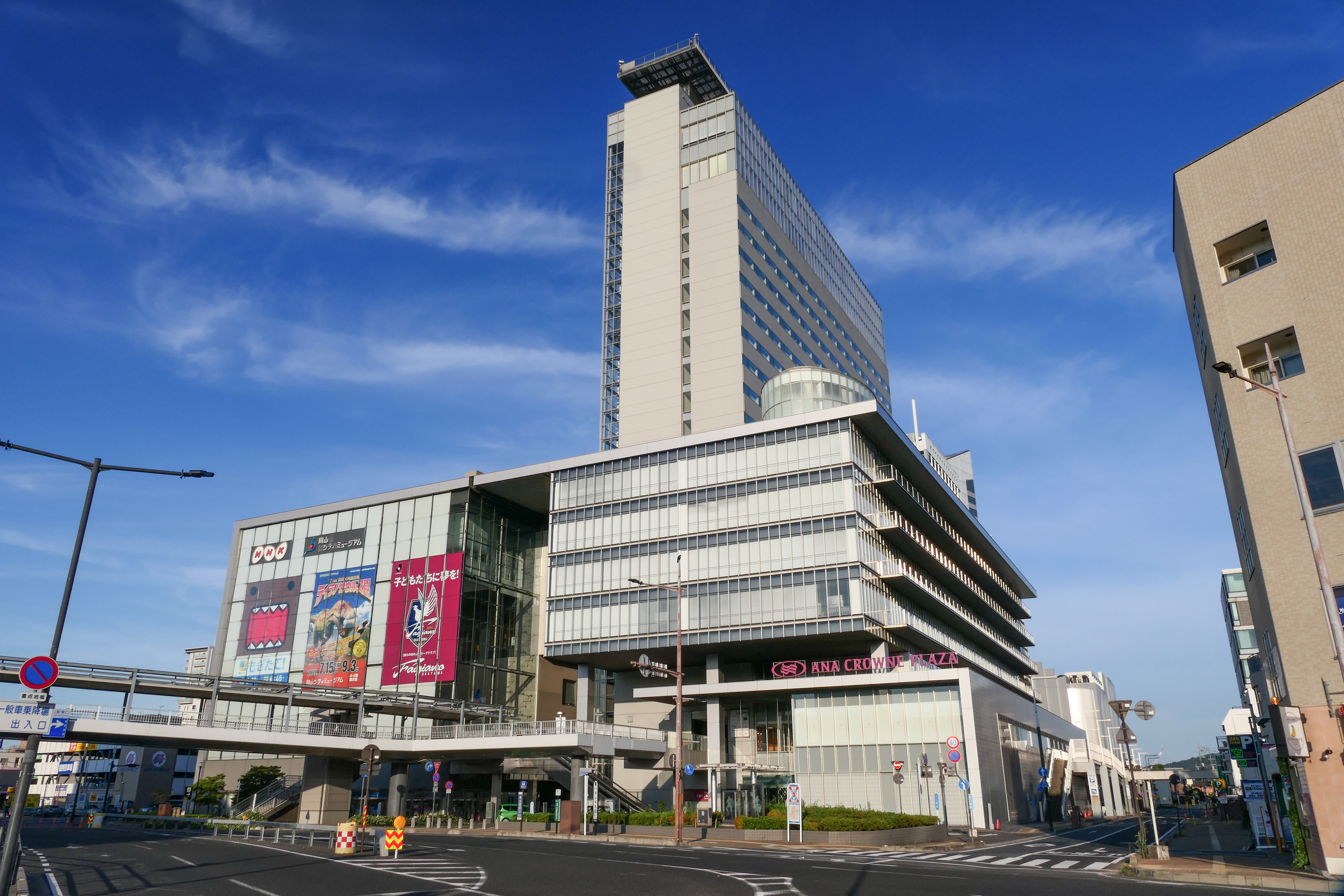
Current building

The NHK Okayama Broadcasting Station (NHK岡山放送局, NHK Okayama Hoso Kyoku) is a unit of the NHK that oversees terrestrial broadcasting in Okayama Prefecture.

== History ==
JOKK started broadcasting on February 1, 1931, JOKB followed on April 1, 1964. FM test broadcasts (JOKK-FMX) began on April 1, 1964, relaying stereo programming from Osaka.

JOKK-TV started broadcasting on December 23, 1957, JOKB-TV on June 29, 1963. The first color broadcasts were held on October 1, 1964, on JOKK, JOPK followed on March 20, 1966. Color film arrived to the local news unit during 1970. In 1976, JOPK-FM converted to stereo, and on March 16, 1981, the NHK FM microwave relay network reached Okayama, ending dependence on Osaka.

On June 4, 1983, JOPK-TV converted to stereo, JOPP-TV followed on March 21, 1991. It moved to its current building in 2005, near Okayama Station.

On March 1, 2021, an NHK Radio 1 FM relay station from Takahashi began broadcasting.

NHK+ added local programming on May 22, 2023.

== Programming ==
As of fiscal 2025:

- News bulletin on weekdays (12:15-12:20pm)
- Mogitate! (weekdays 6:15-7pm)
- Mogitate! 645 (6:45-7pm, shared with Matsue, Tottori produces the Saturday edition and Matsue the Sunday edition)
- Mogitate! 845 (weeknights 8:45-7pm, replaced by regional news service on holidays at 8:55pm from Hiroshima)
- @okayama (irregular Fridays 7:30-7:55pm, repeated the following Saturday at 7:30-7:55am, also shown on delay in Hiroshima)
- Thinking Okayama (occasional; can sometimes air on NHK Educational TV)
- News bulletins on NHK Radio 1 and NHK FM: 12:15-12:20pm (NHK Radio 1 only), 1:55-2pm and 6:50-7pm
