= NHK Saga Broadcasting Station =

NHK Saga Radio (JOSP)
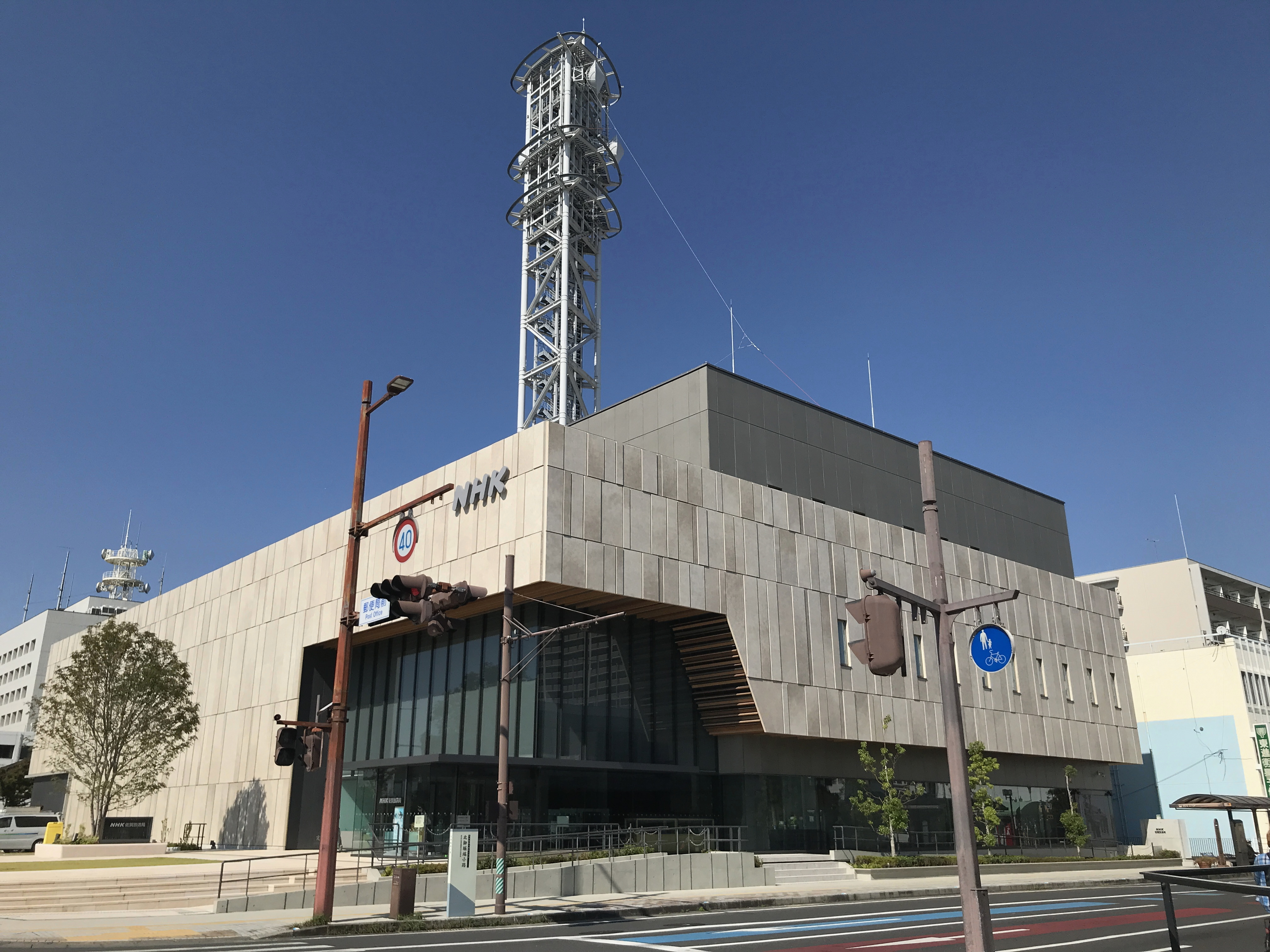

Saga; Japan
- Broadcast area: Saga Prefecture
- Frequency: 963 kHz (AM)

Programming
- Language: Japanese
- Format: Public broadcasting
- Affiliations: NHK Radio 1

Ownership
- Owner: NHK (Japan Broadcasting Corporation)

History
- First air date: December 28, 1941; 84 years ago

Technical information
- Licensing authority: MIC
- Power: 1 kW

Links
- Website: www.nhk.or.jp/saga/

The NHK Saga Broadcasting Station (NHK佐賀放送局, NHK Saga Hōsō Kyoku) is a unit of the NHK that oversees terrestrial broadcasting in Saga Prefecture. It uses the JOSP call sign (JOSD was used for NHK Educational TV until centralization of all stations under Tokyo in 2025; despite this, the callsign is still used for legal identifications).

== History ==
Radio station JOSP started broadcasting on December 28, 1941, while the FM counterpart began on March 22, 1965 (88.1).

On March 17, 1968, the television facilities were completed, in time for the start of regular television broadcasts. These started on March 15, 1969, with the establishment of JOSP-TV (NHK General TV, channel 38) and JOSD-TV (NHK Educational TV, channel 40), both broadcasting on UHF from the Kumayama transmitter. At the same time, transmitters in Karatsu, Imari, Taku and Arita, used to relay neighboring NHK stations, were transferred to the jurisdiction of the Saga station. Due to an increase in power at the NHK Radio 2 station in Kumamoto, the local Radio 2 station (JOSD) closed on March 20, 1974.

NHK Saga moved to new premises on September 30, 2021, after delays due to slowdowns caused by the pandemic. It became fully-operational on May 9, 2022. On May 15, 2023, local programming was added to NHK+.
