= NHK Oita Broadcasting Station =

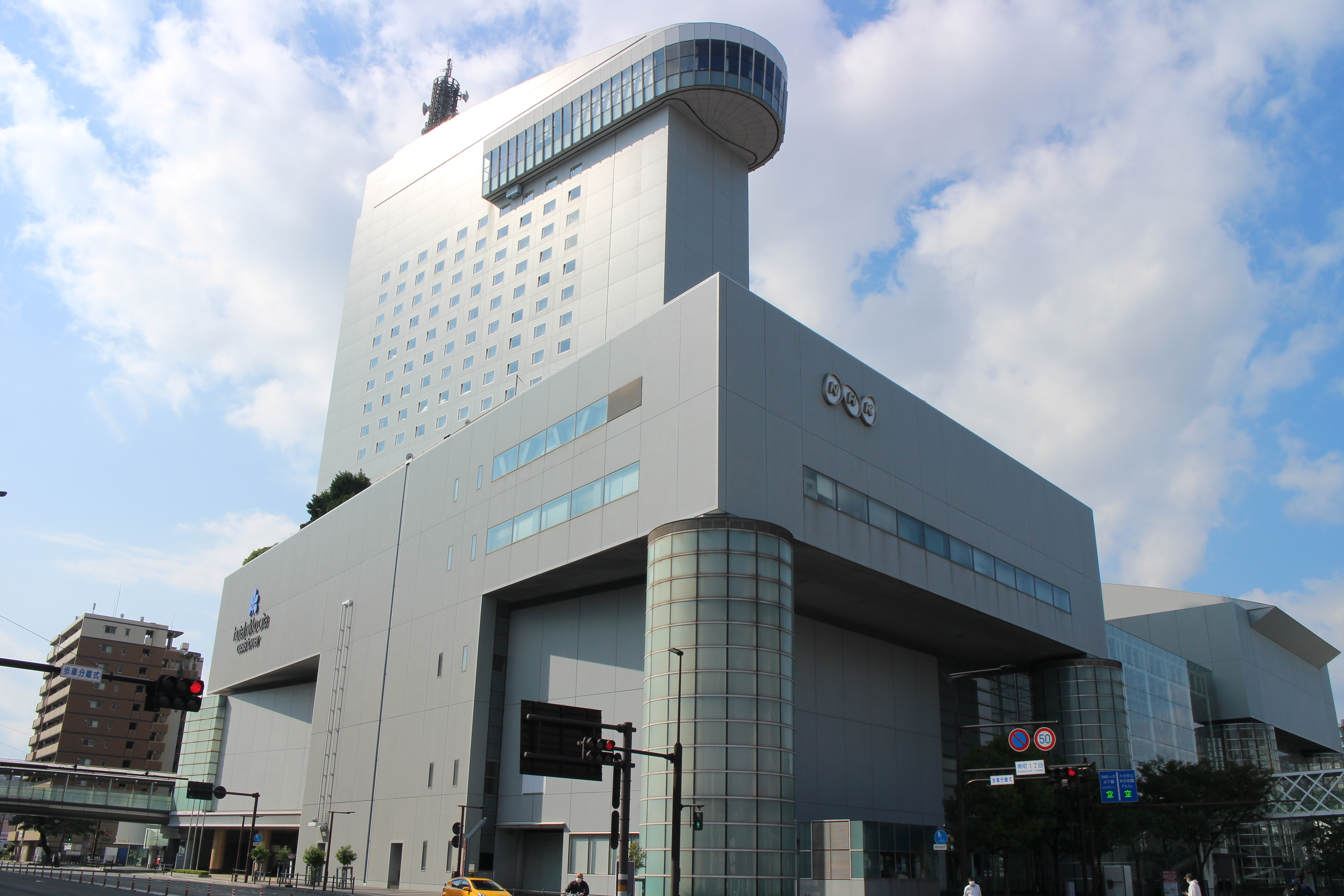
Head office

The NHK Ōita Broadcasting Station (NHK大分放送局, NHK Ōita Hōsō Kyoku) is a unit of the NHK that oversees terrestrial broadcasting in Ōita Prefecture.

== History ==
Radio station JOIP started broadcasting on June 20, 1941, JOID followed on April 25, 1950. JOIP-TV started on August 24, 1959, while JOID-TV launched in December 1962. JOIP started color broadcasts on October 1, 1964, JOID-TV followed on March 20, 1966.

NHK+ added Oita programming on May 15, 2023.

== Programming ==
As of fiscal 2023, NHK Oita produces the evening news program Bundoki, which is shown at 6:10pm on weeknights (weekends from 6:45pm). A noontime news block runs from 12:15pm to 12:20pm on weekdays. The primetime Oita 845 is shown in the local news slot before News Watch 9, only on weeknights. It airs occasional special programs on Friday nights at 7:30pm, @Oita (around ten editions a year) and Bunbun Tankentai (around five editions a year). NHK Oita has the rights to Oita Trinita's home J2 League matches.
