= NHK Toyama Broadcasting Station =

The NHK Toyama Broadcasting Station (NHK富山放送局, NHK Toyama Hōsō Kyoku) is a unit of the NHK that oversees terrestrial broadcasting in Toyama Prefecture. Radio 1, FM and GTV use the JOIG calls, Radio 2 and ETV use JOIC.

== History ==
The station started broadcasting on December 13, 1935. At the time of launching, its antenna, weighing 75 meters in height, was the highest in Hokuriku. On January 3, 1949, NHK Radio 2 (JOIC) started broadcasting.

The station conducted a closed-circuit television test signal on November 2–6, 1951 at the Toyama Chamber of Commerce and Industry's Promotion Hall, before regular television broadcasts began. Full broadcasts began on October 15, 1958; JOIC-TV followed on April 1, 1961, alongside an unmanned radio transmitter in Toyoda. On July 22, 1962, JOIG-TV started color broadcasts. JOIC-TV followed on November 1, 1964.

On March 25, 1966, the television transmitter at Mount Kureha is deactivated, while on March 20, 1967, its second building at Shin-Somawa is completed.

On August 3, 1991, the new building is completed. Digital terrestrial television broadcasts began on October 1, 2004, alongside Kitanihon Broadcasting.

On May 29, 2023, local news produced at the station was added to NHK+.
