= NHK Tokushima Broadcasting Station =

Unit of the Japan Broadcasting Corporation

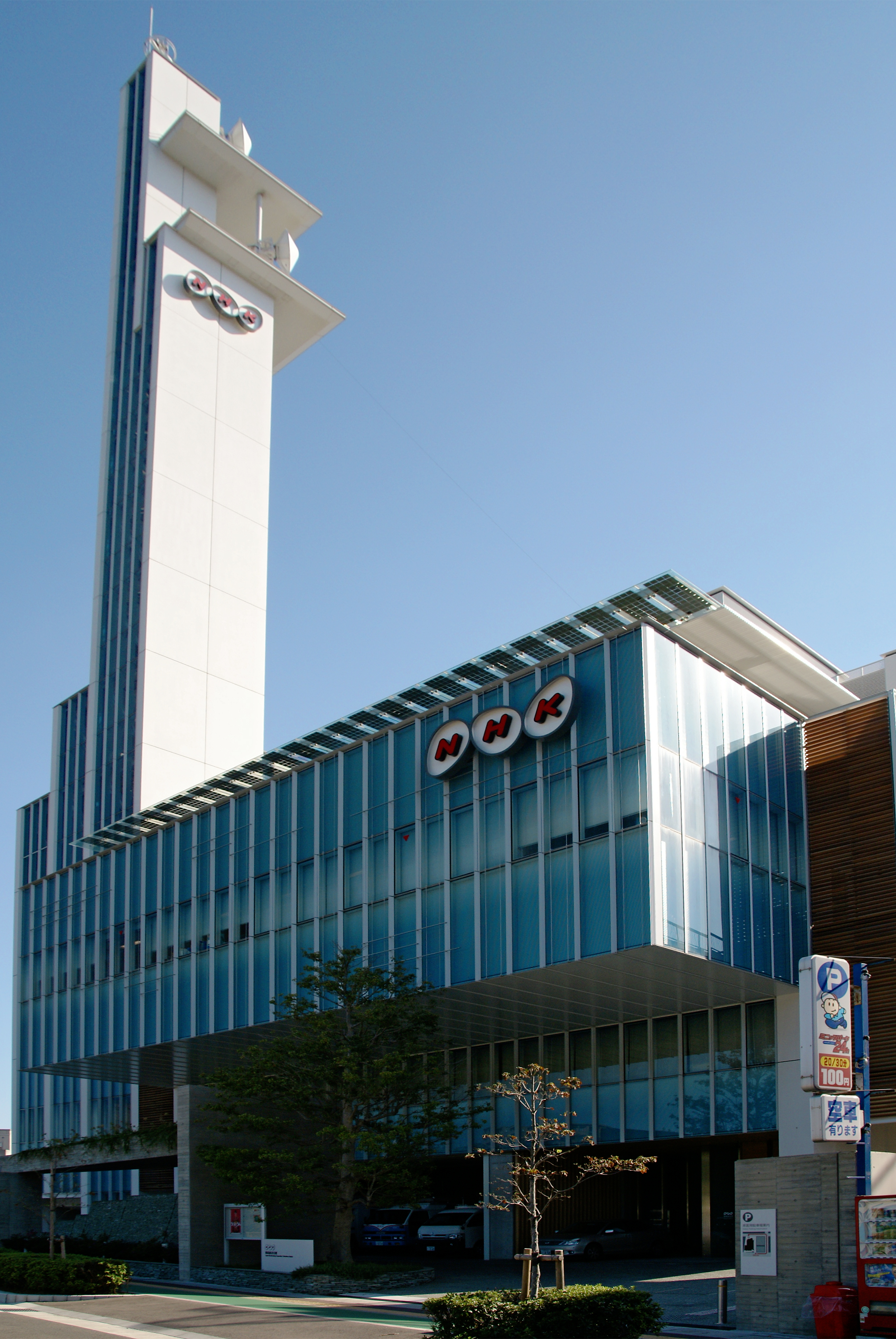
Head office

The NHK Tokushima Broadcasting Station (NHK徳島放送局, NHK Tokushima Hoso Kyoku) is a unit of the NHK that oversees terrestrial broadcasting in Tokushima Prefecture.

== History ==
NHK started radio broadcasts in Tokushima on July 23, 1933 (JOXK). Since 1973, NHK only operates one AM radio station in the prefecture, as the Radio 2 station (JOXB) was shut down in order for the Osaka station to increase its power. The Ikeda relay station, which used to relay the Osaka station, has switched in the 2000s to the jurisdiction of the Matsuyama station following the conversion of television signals to digital.

In the late 1960s, the Tokushima station held two firsts in Japanese broadcasting. On February 20, 1968, it opened the first UHF television station in Japan, which was the Tokushima station of NHK Educational TV. In March 1969, NHK Tokushima started its FM broadcasting, and in September, NHK Tokushima held the first televised public opinion broadcast for the elections for the post of governor of Tokushima Prefecture.

On March 20, 1973, NHK Tokushima Radio 2 station was abolished in order for the Osaka station to increase its power.

In September 1985, NHK Tokushima emergency warning broadcast begins. In August 1986, NHK Tokushima General TV audio multiplex broadcasting begins.

On September 4, 2006, NHK Tokushima starts broadcasting from the current building, and digital terrestrial television broadcasting begins in October.

On May 22, 2023, local programs were added to the NHK+ platform.

In case the Nankai Trough Earthquake happens, the NHK Tokushima Broadcasting Station has a satellite studio located at a short distance from the main building to allow the continuation of broadcasting and editing in case of emergency.
