= NHK Kochi Broadcasting Station =

Unit of the Japan Broadcasting Corporation

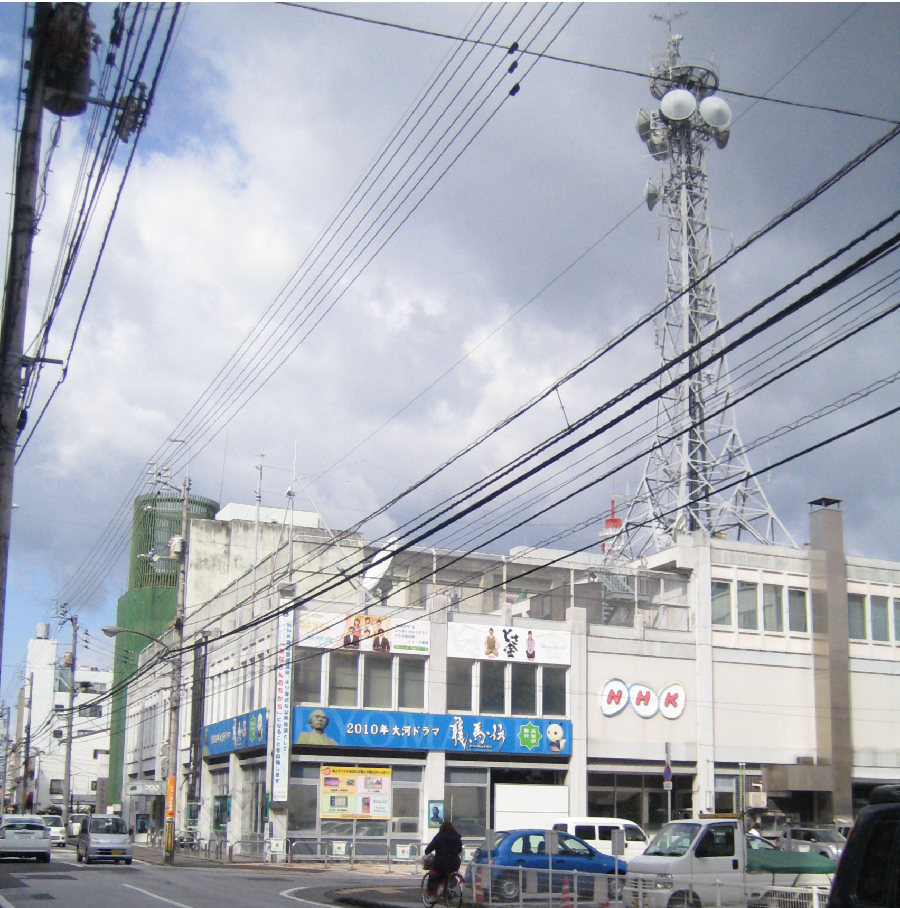
Head office

The NHK Kochi Broadcasting Station (NHK徳島放送局, NHK Kōchi Hoso Kyoku) is a unit of the NHK that oversees terrestrial broadcasting in Kōchi Prefecture.

== History ==
JORK started broadcasting on November 28, 1932; JORB followed in December 1948.

Television broadcasts began on November 28, 1958. On December 8, to celebrate its launch, the song Leaving Southern Tosa was released in a cover by Peggy Hayama. Local programming began in December 1960, followed by JORB-TV in August 1961.

The Nakamura Broadcasting Station which NHK used to deliver its local service was temporarily submerged as a result of a typhoon in August 1963.

On April 1, 1964, JORB-FM started test broadcasts. Initially monaural, these became stereo on April 6. On October 1, JORK-TV started color broadcasts; JORB-TV followed on March 20, 1966.

In early October 1971, color television news production began. Work to convert JORB-FM to stereo was done in 1977; this enabled the station to do the conversion. Dependence on Osaka for networked stereo programming ended with the installation of PCM lines on February 26, 1983. JORK-TV started stereo broadcasts on August 8, 1986; JORB-TV followed on December 24, 1990.

On March 22, 2023, FM simulcasts of NHK Radio 1 began from the Mount Kashio transmitter, approved by the Ministry of Internal Affairs and Communications the previous year. On May 22, local programs were added to the NHK+ platform.
