= NHK Fukui Broadcasting Station =

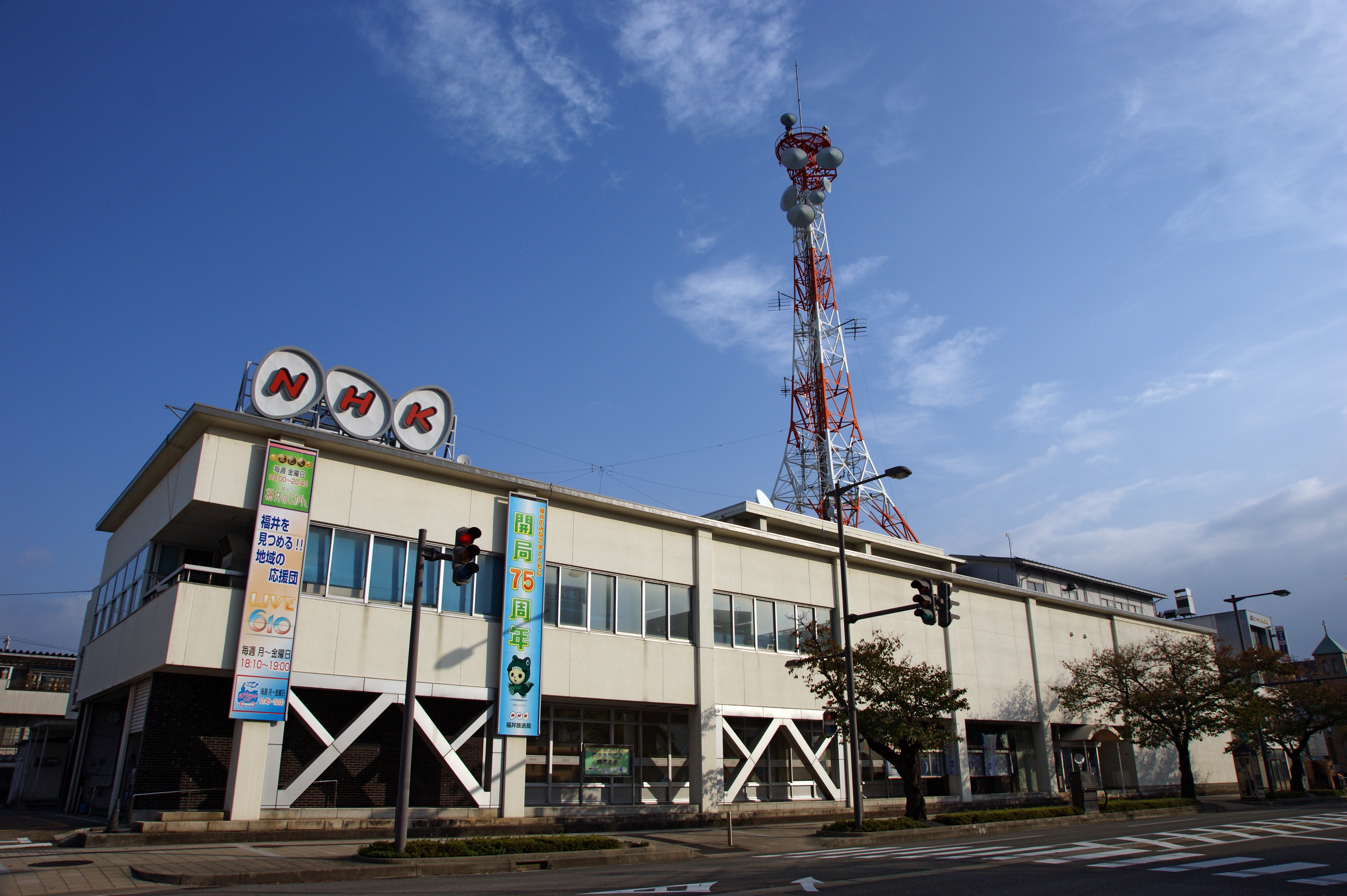
NHK Fukui Broadcast Station, Fukui Prefecture, Japan

The NHK Fukui Broadcasting Station (NHK福井放送局, NHK Fukui Hōsō Kyoku) is a unit of the NHK that oversees terrestrial broadcasting in Fukui Prefecture. Radio 1, FM and GTV use the JOFG calls, Radio 2 and ETV use JOFC.

== History ==
Station JOFG started broadcasting on July 13, 1933, with its inauguration. In October, it carried special military exercises carried out in the prefecture, and broadcast them nationwide. On July 17, 1945, the station was damaged in an air raid. JOFC started broadcasting on December 1, 1948.

Television broadcasts (JOFG-TV) began on August 3, 1959, followed by JOFC-TV on November 1, 1962. JOFG-TV started receiving networked programming in color when it converted its facilities on July 21, 1962. JOFC-TV followed on November 1, 1964.

On May 29, 2023, local news produced at the station was added to NHK+.
