= NHK Fukushima Broadcasting Station =

Unit of the Japan Broadcasting Corporation

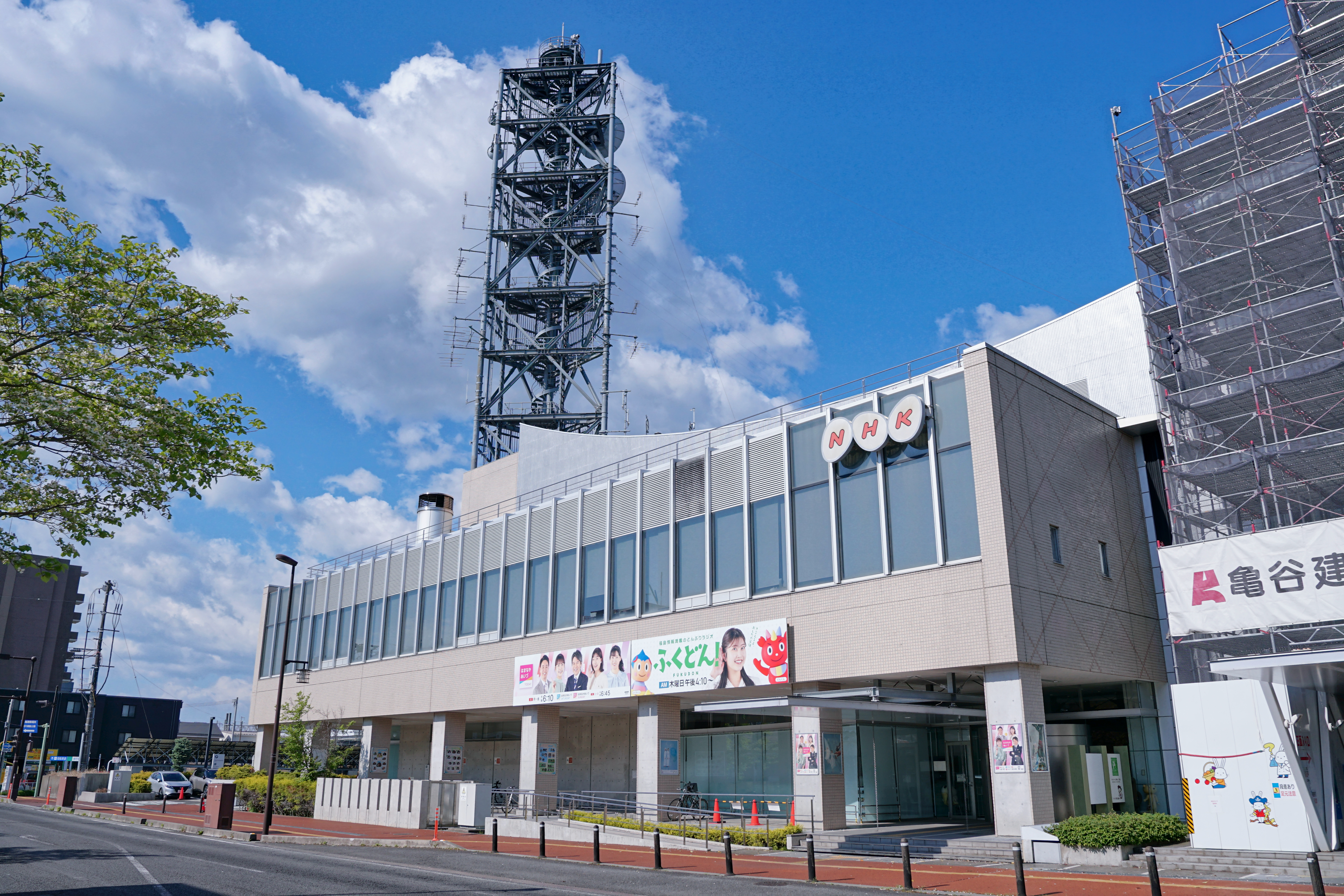
NHK Fukushima Broadcasting Station

The NHK Fukushima Broadcasting Station (NHK福島放送局, NHK Fukushima Hōsō Kyoku) is a unit of the NHK that oversees terrestrial broadcasting in Fukushima Prefecture. The station uses the JOFP and JOFD calls.

== History ==
JOFP opened on at 11am on February 12, 1941, the same day as JOCP in Koriyama. Radio 2 (JOFD) started broadcasting on June 1, 1951; its broadcasts went regular on May 10, 1952.

JOFP-TV signed on at 7am on March 1, 1959, on VHF channel 9, from a transmitter at Mount Sasamori, Shinobu District. In order to receive approval, it had to conduct preliminary tests before receiving the greenlight from JOHK. JOFD-TV started broadcasting on November 1, 1960. JOFP-TV converted to color on September 17, 1965 In 1971, local news items began to be shot on color film. and JOFD-TV on March 20, 1966.

In 1977, work to convert local operations to stereo started. Full-time stereo broadcasting on JOFP-FM began on March 16, 1981. Television stereo broadcasts began on JOFP-TV on August 2, 1984, while JOPG-TV followed on March 21, 1991.

Fukushima was one of the seven locations where NHK STRL did its pilot Super High Vision broadcasts (comparable to 8K UHD) during the duration of the 2012 Summer Olympics.

Local programming was added to NHK+ on June 5, 2023.
