= Seto Digital Tower =

Broadcast tower in Japan

Coordinates: 35.1955°N 137.0743°E

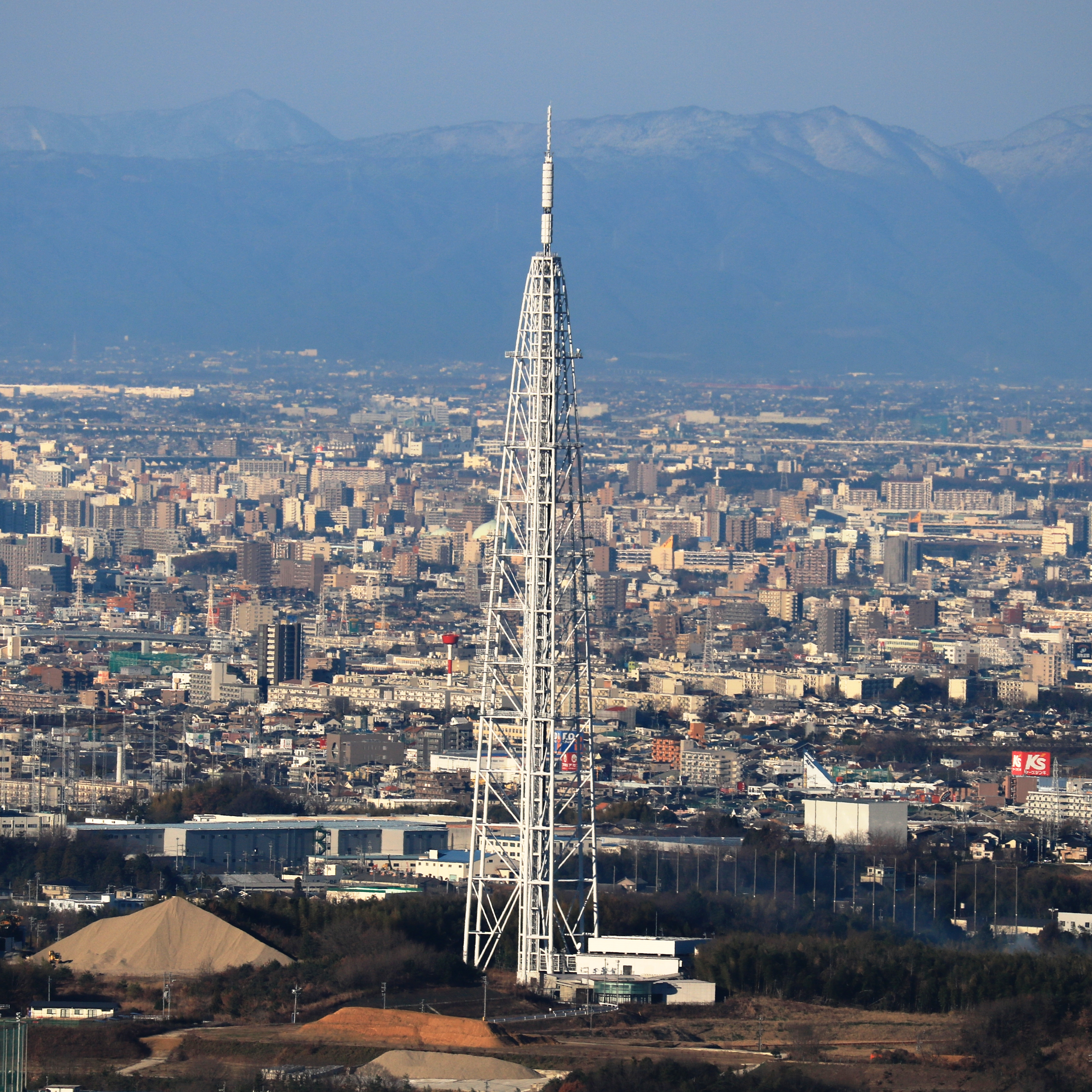
- Seto Digital Tower
- Interactive map of the Seto Digital Tower area

General information
- Location: Seto, Aichi, Japan
- Completed: 2011

Height
- Antenna spire: 245 m

Seto Digital Tower is a 244.7 m (803 ft) tall digital broadcasting tower in Seto, Aichi, Japan. In 2011, the tower replaced the Nagoya TV Tower which previously had the role of broadcasting in the Nagoya area. The tower is of a unique design not known to have been used elsewhere before. Six outer steel legs provide support and structural stability to a central lattice structure akin to those found in guyed lattice masts.

== See also ==
- Lattice tower
