= NHK Asahikawa Broadcasting Station =

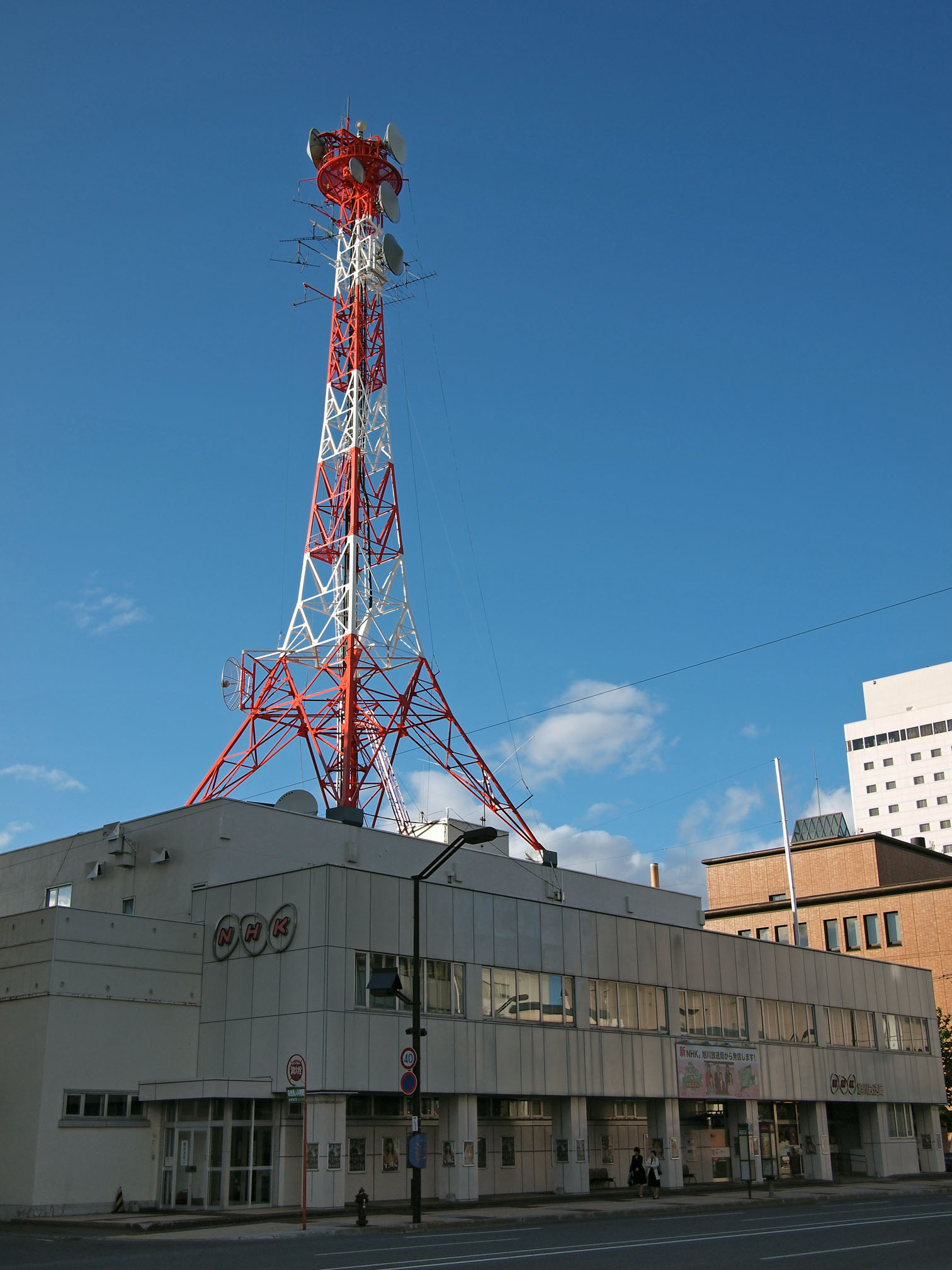
NHK Asahikawa Broadcasting Station

The NHK Asahikawa Broadcasting Station (NHK旭川放送局, NHK Asahikawa Hōsō Kyoku) is a unit of the NHK that oversees terrestrial broadcasting in northern Hokkaido Prefecture, based in Asahikawa.

== History ==
In 1928, the Asahikawa Chamber of Commerce and Industry, among other local entities, began uniting their efforts to create a local radio station. NHK started building for its facilities in July 1932; test broadcasts began on July 30, 1933, after that the Asahikawa Broadcasting Station was formally established on August 1 (call sign JOCG) and began regular broadcasts on September 4, on 700kc, output of 300 watts and a GRP-35B transmitter (manufactured by Tokyo Electric Radio). The pre-war years were marked by two local firsts: the first baseball broadcast covered by JOCG was broadcast on July 9, 1934, with the final of the Hokkaido Rubber Baseball Tournament from the Asahikawa Municipal Stadium (predecessor of the current Starffin Baseball Stadium) and the coverage of an eclipse on June 19, 1935.

In April 1950, NHK Radio 2 (JOCG) began broadcasting. Television broadcasts (JOCG-TV from Mount Asahi) started on December 28, 1958, followed by JOCC-TV on November 1, 1960. That month saw the finishing of an extension to the existing building to accommodate television broadcasts. In 1964, it moved to its current facilities on March 1, while the first local television program, Northern Hokkaido Topics, began in April. On June 25, JOCG-FMX started test broadcasts in mono. The radio station moved from East Asahikawa to Asahikawa on January 16, 1965, while the old building was deactivated. It was sold in 1966 to city control and became the Asahikawa City Community Center.

On March 1, 1969, JOCG-FMX becomes JOCG-FM, in conjunction with the beginning of full-time NHK FM broadcasts. Local news in color began on December 24, 1969. On October 20, 1977, the FM transmitter was converted to stereo. On June 13, 1979, it, alongside the Matsue station, began employing computer-based operating systems.

NHK reorganized its broadcasting units in Hokkaido from seven to four at the beginning of fiscal 2022. The Asahikawa station absorbed most of the work done by the Kitami station but strengthened the local programming in the seven stations of the prefecture. Asahikawa and Kitami together form the North Hokkaido and Okhotsk Sea unit of NHK's Hokkaido branch. However, from the beginning of fiscal 2023, it was decided that the regional units outside of Sapporo within the prefecture would be given to Sapporo, ultimately closing some of the departments in Asahikawa.
