= NHK Nagoya Broadcasting Station =

Unit of Japan Broadcasting Corporation

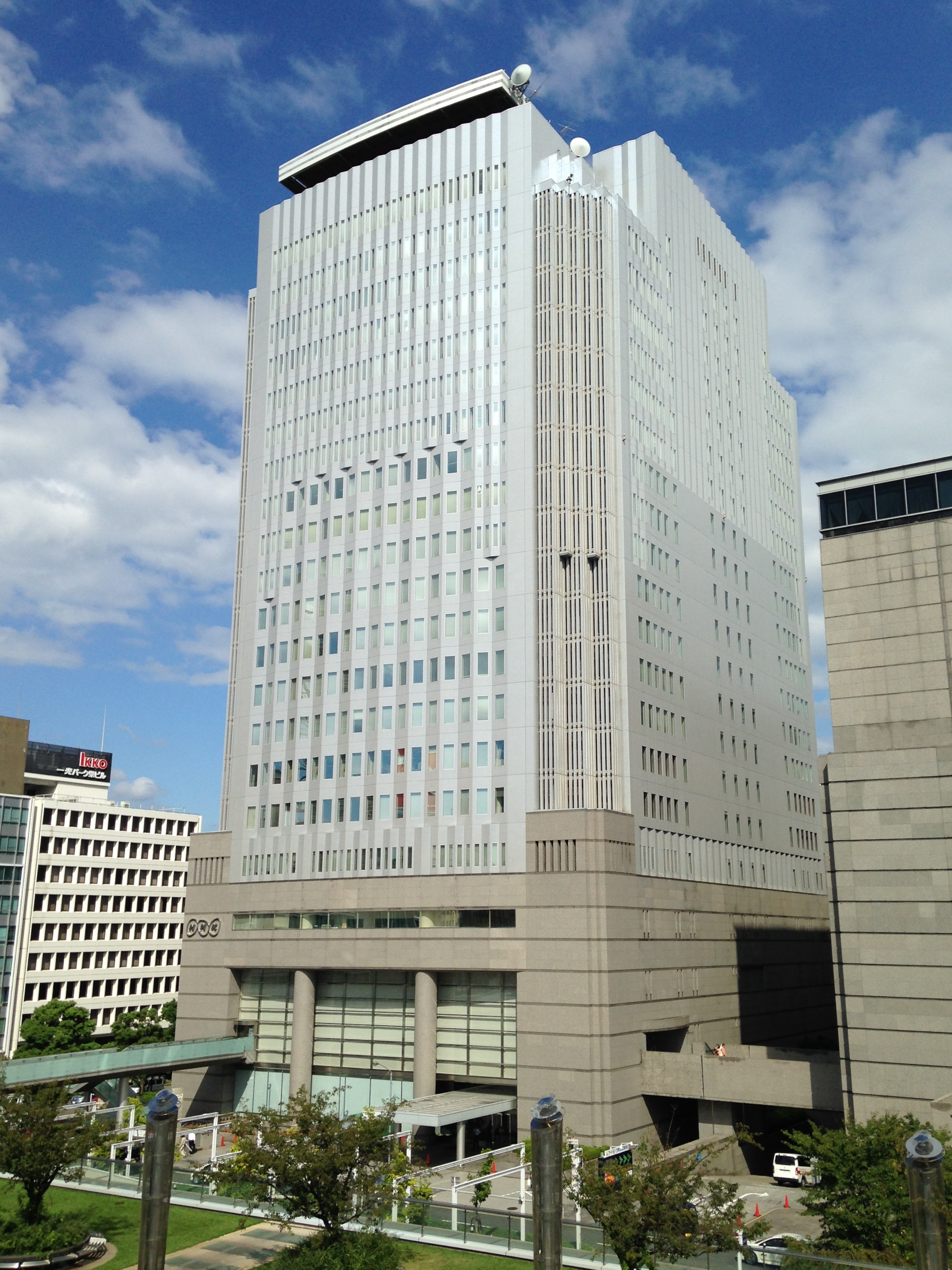
NHK Nagoya Broadcasting Center Building

The NHK Nagoya Broadcasting Station (NHK名古屋放送局, NHK Nagoya Hōsō Kyoku) is a unit of the NHK that oversees terrestrial broadcasting in Aichi Prefecture. It is the head station in the Chubu area, which in NHK's jurisdiction consists of Aichi, Gifu, Mie, Shizuoka, Ishikawa, Toyama and Fukui. The stations broadcast from the NHK Nagoya Broadcasting Center.

The callsign used is JOCK (JOCB for Radio 2 and Educational TV), and is also known as just CK.

== History ==
=== Pre-war ===
After the Great Kanto Earthquake in 1923, the Japanese government realized the importance of broadcasting and began planning to establish a state-owned broadcasting industry. At the same time, the public is also interested in participating in the broadcasting industry. In 1924, 64 companies in Japan applied to open private radio stations, and 3 companies in Nagoya also applied. Faced with the fierce competition among private operators to obtain broadcasting licenses, the then Minister of Communications, Takeshi Inukai, decided to change the policy of allowing private radio stations to be opened and established a broadcasting system in which public interest corporations collected listening fees to maintain operations. On January 10, 1925, the Nagoya Broadcasting Bureau was formally established, with Kamino Kinnosuke as the first acting director. In June of the same year, the Nagoya Broadcasting Bureau headquarters was completed. The building has two floors and houses a Japanese-style recording studio and a Western-style recording studio. On June 23, Nagoya Broadcasting Station began trial broadcasting.

At 9:30 in the morning on July 15, 1925, Nagoya Broadcasting Bureau officially launched its broadcast, becoming the third radio station in Japan. At the time of its launch, Nagoya Broadcasting Station's programs were broadcast for an average of 4.5 hours a day, and the programs were mainly based on news, music, stock markets, and rice market transactions. There are 3,291 households that have signed up to listen, and the listening fee is 2 yen per month. By the end of October of the same year, the number of contracts signed by Nagoya Broadcasting Bureau increased to 13,000. On October 31, Nagoya Broadcasting Bureau broadcast the Tenjo Festival celebration ceremony live, which was the first outdoor live broadcast in the history of Japanese broadcasting. In January of the following year, the Nagoya Broadcasting Bureau reduced the listening fee to 1 yen per month, and the number of listening households successfully doubled in four months, from 17,000 households at the end of December 1924 to 34,000 households in April 1925. On August 2, 1925, the Nagoya Broadcasting Bureau realized Japan's first live theater broadcast.

On August 20, 1926, the Japanese government integrated the broadcasting bureaus in Tokyo, Osaka, and Nagoya into the Japan Broadcasting Corporation, and the Nagoya Broadcasting Station was reorganized into the Nagoya Central Broadcasting Station, Tokai Branch of the Japan Broadcasting Corporation. In 1928, the Nagoya Central Broadcasting Station began to broadcast radio gymnastics programs. On December 27, 1929, Nagoya Central Broadcasting Bureau established a 10-kilowatt high-power signal relay station in Okehama, greatly expanding its radio wave coverage area. The Nagoya Central Broadcasting Bureau established Radio 2 in 1933, which mainly broadcasts educational programs.

The Pacific War that began on December 8, 1941, brought drastic changes to the Japanese broadcasting industry. Nagoya Central Broadcasting Station suspended the second broadcast and will no longer broadcast any weather forecast and other weather-related programs. Entertainment programs no longer broadcast songs from "enemy countries" such as the United Kingdom and the United States. Words such as announcer (アナウンサー) and news (ニュース) all used Chinese characters to replace foreign words. After 1944, the entertainment programs of the Nagoya Central Broadcasting Station decreased significantly, and were replaced by programs that talked about the current situation and encouraged war.

After Saipan was captured in 1944, the US military began to transmit broadcast signals to Japan. The Nagoya Central Broadcasting Station therefore launched a blocking signal to prevent Japanese people from listening to US military programs. After the US military began air raids on the Japanese mainland, Nagoya Central Broadcasting Station began to broadcast the "Air Defense Intelligence" program and broadcast "Air Raid Warning" during air raids.

The importance of broadcasting also increased dramatically due to the air raids, becoming a daily necessity for the people, and the number of contracted households also increased significantly. In 1944, the broadcasting penetration rate within the jurisdiction of the Nagoya Central Broadcasting Bureau reached 54.2%. Affected by the air raid, all facilities of the Nagoya Central Broadcasting Station except the large recording studio were burned down. On August 15, 1945, the Nagoya Central Broadcasting Station broadcast the Tamone Broadcasting broadcast by Emperor Showa announcing Japan's surrender. Afterwards, the Nagoya Central Broadcasting Bureau resumed broadcasting the weather forecast on August 22, and resumed broadcasting of Radio 2 on September 1.

=== Post-war ===
On June 15, 1946, the rebuilt headquarters of the Nagoya Central Broadcasting Bureau was completed. After the establishment of the "Three Radio Laws" ("Radio Law", "Broadcasting Law", "Radio Wave Supervisory Committee Establishment Law") in 1950, the Japan Broadcasting Association was restructured into a special legal person. The following year, with the launch of Japan's first private broadcaster Chubu Nippon Broadcasting Corporation, the Nagoya area took the lead in entering the era of coexistence of NHK and private broadcasters.

The Nagoya Broadcasting Bureau established an experimental TV station on July 27, 1951, and piloted a TV program once a week for 3 hours each time. On November 1 of the following year, the trial broadcast time was extended to 8 hours per week. On March 1, 1954, the Nagoya Broadcasting Bureau officially began broadcasting the TV program. On June 19 of the same year, the Nagoya TV Tower jointly funded by NHK Nagoya, Chubu Nippon Broadcasting Corporation, and Nagoya's local government and financial circles was completed and became the TV signal transmitting site for NHK Nagoya.

On July 15, 1955, the 30th anniversary of the launch of NHK Nagoya, the Nagoya Broadcasting Center was completed, which greatly improved the program production conditions of NHK Nagoya. On August 9, 1961, NHK Nagoya began to pilot the education channel, and officially started broadcasting the education channel on March 27 of the following year. On December 16, 1963, NHK Nagoya began broadcasting color TV programs. NHK Nagoya signed a cooperation agreement with Nanjing Television in Nanjing, a sister city of Nagoya City, in 1988 to exchange programs with each other. In order to promote the launch of the satellite TV channel, NHK Nagoya broadcast advertisements on Tokai Radio in 1989. It was the first time NHK broadcast advertisements on a private radio station.

In 1986, NHK Nagoya decided to build a new broadcasting center in the Sakae Park area, and construction started on December 9, 1988. On August 26, 1991, the NHK Nagoya Broadcasting Center held an opening ceremony. This building is 21 stories high. NHK uses the 1st to 5th floors while the 6th to 20th floors are office buildings of other companies. There are facilities such as an observation restaurant on the 21st floor. Among the parts used by NHK, there are television studios on the first to third floors, a news center on the fourth floor, and the offices of the affairs department on the fifth floor. In 1992, the building won the Nagoya City Urban Landscape Award.

In preparation for broadcasting digital TV, in 2001, NHK Nagoya and five private TV stations in Nagoya decided to jointly build the Seto Digital Tower in Seto City for transmitting digital TV signals. On December 1, 2003, NHK Nagoya began broadcasting digital TV signals [4]:242. On July 24, 2011, NHK Nagoya stopped broadcasting analog TV. NHK Nagoya began trial broadcasting of 4K and 8K ultra-high-definition television in 2016, and officially began broadcasting NHK BS4K and NHK BS8K in 2018.
