= NHK Matsue Broadcasting Station =

Regional unit of the Japan Broadcasting Corporation

The NHK Matsue Broadcasting Station (NHK松江放送局, NHK Matsue Hōsō Kyoku) is a unit of the Japan Broadcasting Corporation (NHK) that oversees terrestrial broadcasting in Shimane Prefecture.

== History ==
The station began broadcasting on March 7, 1932, under the call sign JOTK. JOTB (Radio 2) started on September 1, 1946. NHK FM started local broadcasting on July 1, 1964. Initially, the FM broadcasts arrived in the form of packages sent from Tokyo, but on April 5, 1965, this was changed to relays from Osaka, which were later sent to Okayama and only then to Matsue. Television broadcasts began on October 28, 1959, with JOTK-TV, followed by JOTB-TV on December 28, 1962. The stations converted to color on March 20, 1966. In early October 1971, the news unit started shooting reports with color film.

On March 31, 1980, NHK FM Matsue ended its dependence on Osaka due to the installation of local PCM lines, enabling local carriage of FM stereo audio. JOTK-TV transitioned to stereo on August 8, 1986, and JOTB-TV followed on March 21, 1991.

Digital terrestrial broadcasts began on October 1, 2006. JOTK broadcasts on UHF 21 (LCN 3) and JOTB broadcasts on UHF 19 (LCN 2).

Its new broadcasting hall was completed on July 15, 2022. Full broadcasts from the facility started on March 6, 2023. At the same time, it became the second regional station in the NHK network to use an entirely virtual studio, after Fukushima.

NHK+ added Matsue programming on May 22, 2023.

NHK Educational TV centralized all of its stations on October 6, 2025, ending the local signal after almost 53 years, including the call sign JOTB-DTV. Despite this, the call sign is still being used for legal identification purposes.
