= NHK Matsuyama Broadcasting Station =

Unit of the Japan Broadcasting Corporation

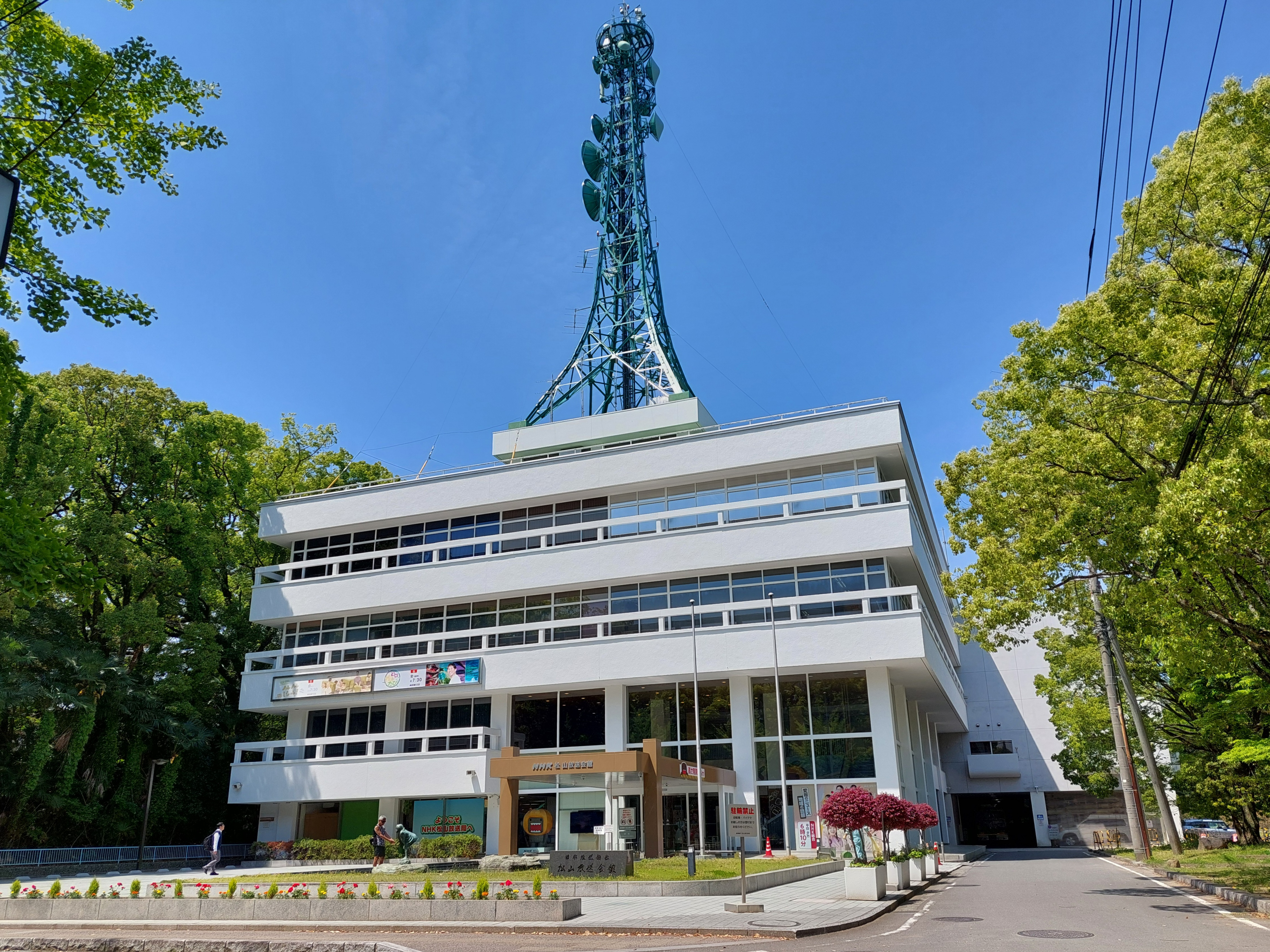
Head office

The NHK Matsuyama Broadcasting Station (NHK松山放送局, NHK Tokushima Hōsō Kyoku) is a unit of the NHK that oversees terrestrial broadcasting in Ehime Prefecture. It is also the main unit for Shikoku.

== History ==
Station JOVG started broadcasting on March 9, 1941. It was promoted to the central broadcasting station of Shikoku on January 1, 1945. Radio 2 broadcasts started on September 1, 1946, using the JOVG2 calls. On July 1, 1948, JOVG became JOZK and JOVG2 became JOZB.

JOZK-TV started broadcasting on May 29, 1957, followed by JOZB-TV on June 1, 1962. Experimental FM broadcasts (JOZK-FMX) started on December 2, 1962. On April 6, 1964, its regular broadcasts began; stereo programming was sent in via packages coming from Tokyo. On October 1, 1964, color television broadcasts began on JOZK-TV, followed by JOZB-TV on March 20, 1966.

On November 30, 1967, the new broadcasting hall was completed, where NHK Matsuyama still broadcasts from. On December 25, 1969, the news operation converted to color. It became the Shikoku NHK headquarters on July 10, 1971.

Digital terrestrial broadcasts began on October 1, 2006. Live subtitled programming began in November 2015 with the 3pm bulletin and Ehime 845, which is shown before News Watch 9. Radio stations JOZK and JOZB were added to radiko as a pilot measure from October 2, 2017, being removed on March 30, 2018. The stations were added full time on April 12, 2018.

Organizational reforms passed in 2019 made it gain the status of broadcasting station headquartered in Matsuyama. Local programming was added to NHK+ on March 3, 2021. The former name, Matsuyama Broadcasting Station, was restored at the beginning of fiscal 2022.
