= NHK Sendai Broadcasting Station =

Unit of Japan Broadcasting Corporation

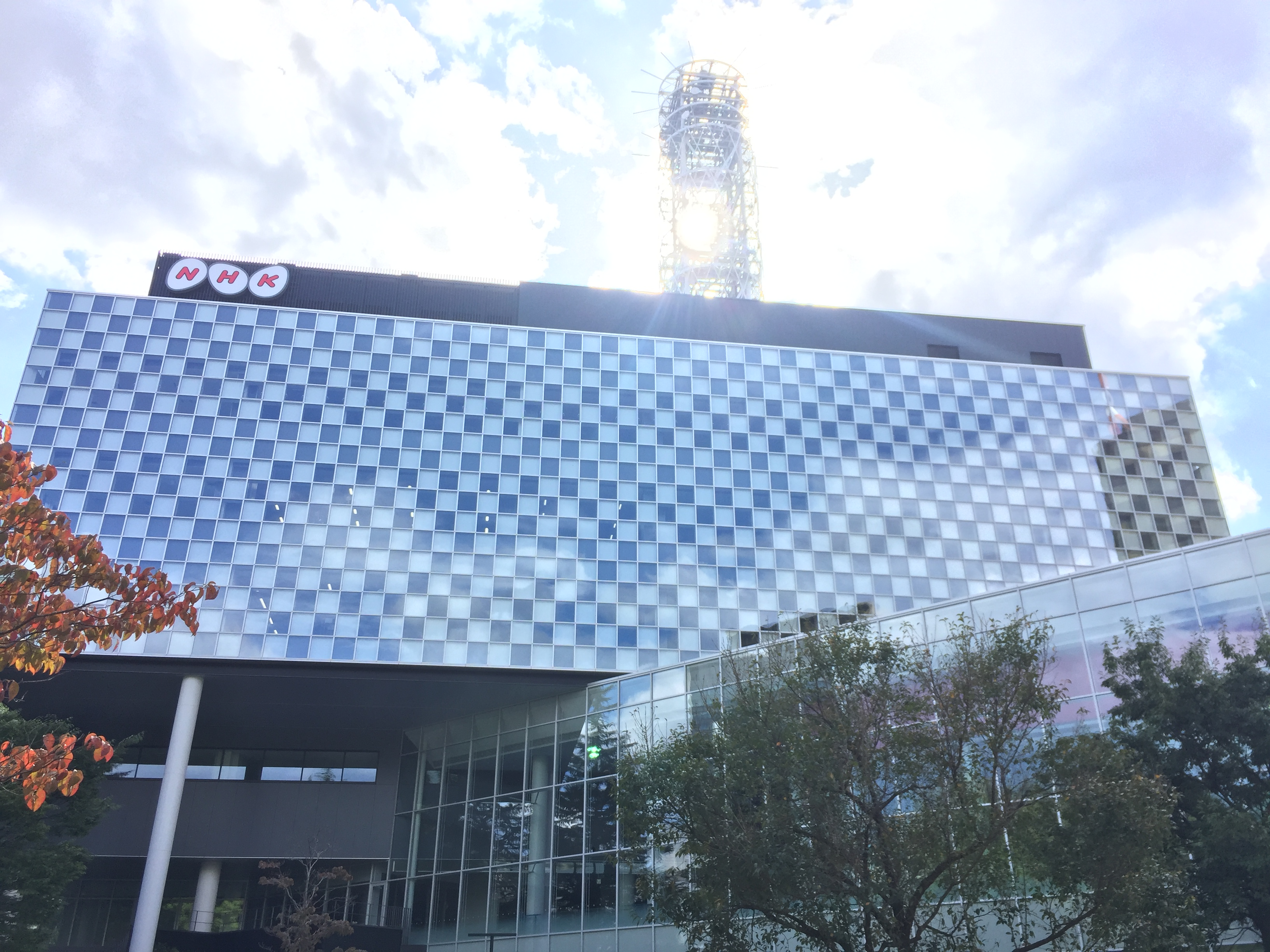

The NHK Sendai Broadcasting Station (NHK仙台放送局, NHK Sendai Hōsō Kyoku) is a unit of the NHK that oversees terrestrial broadcasting in Miyagi Prefecture. It is the head station of NHK's Tohoku block, which has jurisdiction over the six prefectures of the Tohoku region.

The callsigns used are JOHK and JOHB.

== History ==
The station was established on June 9, 1927 and started broadcasting on June 16, 1928. On November 5, it took part in the first live nationwide broadcast between the six stations of the time (Sendai, Tokyo, Nagoya, Osaka, Hiroshima and Kumamoto). A microwave line linking Sendai to Sapporo was opened on July 25, 1933.

On March 21, 1956, coinciding with the beginning of the expansion of television outside of the Kanto, Tokai and Kansai areas, television broadcasts (JOHK-TV) started. NHK Educational Television (JOHB-TV) started broadcasting on December 1, 1960.

In March 1961, it moved to a new five-floor building in 32 Kitaichiban-cho, and started becoming operational in June.

Monaural FM test signals started on December 2, 1962, starting stereo broadcasts on April 6, 1964, where programs from Tokyo were sent to Sendai. On September 24, coinciding with the Olympics, NHK General started color broadcasts in Sendai, while NHK Educational followed on March 20, 1966. The local news service was converted to color during fiscal 1969.

On December 24, 1979, microwave stereo links between Tokyo and Sendai were established. JOHK-TV started stereo broadcasts on August 8, 1981, followed by JOHB-TV on March 21, 1991.

With the implementation of digital terrestrial television, NHK Sendai unveiled its mascot, WaraDE.

On May 22, 2017, it signed a co-operation agreement with Taiwan's China Television to exchange footage from each other and air on their programs. It was expected that NHK General's Sendai station would broadcast Taiwanese footage once a month in its local program Hiru Hapi. Construction work for the new Broadcasting Hall, an eight-floor building, ended on June 5. Test broadcasts on the Radiko platform started on October 30, suspended on March 30, 2018, but restored nearly two weeks later on April 12.

On March 3, 2021, its local programs were added to NHK+.
