= Radiko =

Japanese online radio broadcasting service

Radiko (ラジコ), stylized in lowercase, is a Japanese IP-based radio streaming service operated by radiko Co., Ltd. The service started in March 2010. The slogan is "There is sound that expands the world."

== History ==
Radiko was created as part of a research project in 2007 in Osaka. Six local radio stations began a pilot broadcast using IPv6 on March 5, 2008, limited to Osaka Prefecture.

The pilot Radiko service started on March 15, 2010, receiving 300,000 unique visits and 1,050,000 total visits in its first day. causing its servers to overwhelm.

== Radiko Premium ==
Radiko launched Radiko Premium on April 1, 2014. The basic service can be used for free, but certain functionalities require a subscription.

== Podcasts ==
Radiko started podcasts services on February 14, 2024. It offers a mix of original and existing podcasts.
