= NHK+ =

Japanese video streaming service

- Broadcast area: Japan
- Headquarters: Tokyo, Japan

Programming
- Language: Japanese

Ownership
- Owner: NHK

History
- Launched: 2020
- Closed: 2025
- Replaced by: NHK ONE

NHK+ (NHKプラス) was NHK's official streaming service. It provided simulcasts and already-carried programs seen on both NHK General TV and NHK Educational TV. It shut down in 2025, being replaced by NHK ONE.

== Background ==
In November 2010, then-NHK Chairman Shigeo Fukuchi announced his intention to begin simultaneous distribution of television programs over the Internet, and announced that he would request the Ministry of Internal Affairs and Communications to revise the Broadcasting Act. However, the project stalled due to several concerns. Beyond the need for significant investment in distribution server development, private broadcasters and experts—including Michisada Hirose (then chairman of the Japan Commercial Broadcasting Federation and advisor to TV Asahi) and Masayuki Shimada (president of TV Tokyo)—raised issues such as how to handle copyright and personality rights, as well as whether NHK’s license fee system should apply to households without television sets.

Subsequently, after the revised Broadcasting Act was enacted in 2014, NHK began providing simultaneous broadcasting on NHK's official website and smartphone app for important news such as disasters and national elections, as well as global sports broadcasts such as the Olympics and Paralympics and the FIFA World Cup.

Additionally, since November 2015, the Ministry of Internal Affairs and Communications has held a "Study Group on Issues Related to Broadcasting", where discussions centered on the simultaneous distribution of NHK TV broadcasts. However, due to the problems mentioned above, it took nearly four years for a full-scale simultaneous distribution service to begin.

In response to the revised Broadcasting Act passed and enacted at the 198th Diet/House of Councilors plenary session on June 5, 2019, trial distribution was initially planned to take place at the 70th NHK Kouhaku Uta Gassen held on December 31 of the same year, and full-scale service would be launched within the same year. However, in November of the same year, the Ministry of Internal Affairs and Communications was concerned about NHK's bloat and requested a review of the implementation plan for simultaneous internet distribution services, and at the same time, approval was also postponed until January 14, 2020, so the service implementation was temporarily postponed and started at the date and time mentioned below.

== Overview ==
NHK+ was a service that simultaneously distributed NHK TV's terrestrial (general/E-tele) broadcasts and the Internet after obtaining approval from the Ministry of Internal Affairs and Communications.

Simultaneous program distribution time was limited to a 24-hour period, and broadcasts from NHK Broadcasting Center (South Kanto) were relayed. In addition, missed program distribution can be used any time and any number of times for 7 days after broadcast.

NHK Plus was introduced as a complementary service for areas with poor reception. Subscribers—and members of the same household—can use up to five streams at no extra cost, provided they register and complete the authentication process. For the time being, continuous simultaneous distribution and missed program distribution were not available under business contracts.

The service ended on October 1, 2025, with all of its content integrated into the NHK ONE platform.
