= List of NHK broadcasting stations =

Japan Broadcasting Corporation stations

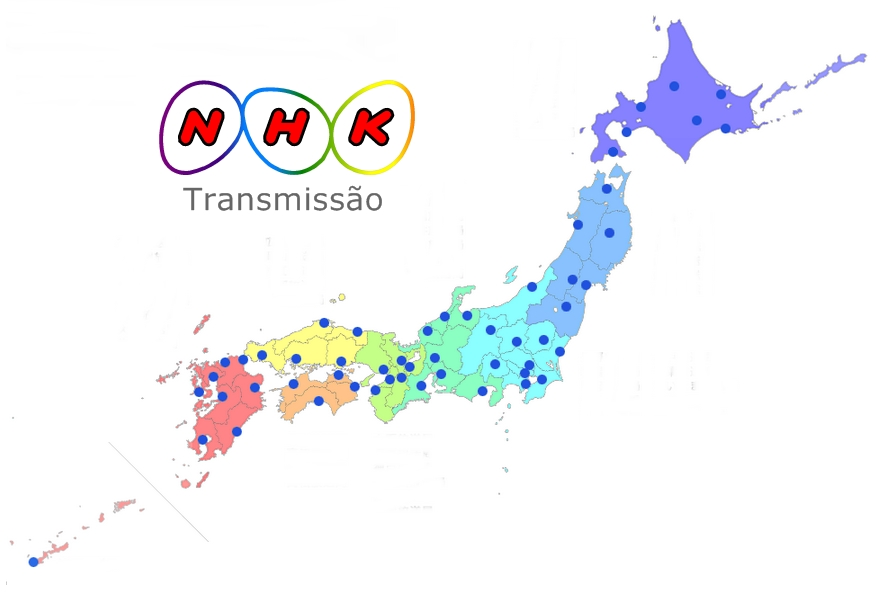
Each dot represents an NHK broadcasting center. The regions are as defined by NHK.

The following is a list of NHK broadcasting stations established by corporation in various parts of Japan. This is a list of broadcasting stations. There are 54 in total, including the Metropolitan Area Station, which has jurisdiction over Tokyo, as a broadcasting station in its own right.

== Details ==
- Broadcasting stations in **bold** are the bases of each region. All stations other than Kanto-Koshinetsu were renamed "base broadcasting stations" due to the organizational reform on June 14, 2019. Regarding Kanto-Koshinetsu, the Metropolitan Area Station, which plays the role of a base broadcasting station, it was established in the organizational reform on August 3, 2020. Furthermore, on April 1, 2022, the names of the seven broadcasting stations will be changed back to "broadcasting stations." NHK states that the positioning and roles of these broadcasting stations will not change after that date.

(City/ward name): Location of the city or ward where the broadcasting station is located. If there are multiple broadcasting stations within the same prefecture, the area under their jurisdiction is indicated separately. When the organization was revised in 2015, the news office and communication department were abolished and integrated into the branch. This section also describes the branches that were created in 1988 after being demoted from broadcasting stations.

- (City/ward name): Location of the city or ward where the broadcasting station is located. If there are multiple broadcasting stations within the same prefecture, the area under their jurisdiction is indicated separately.
- When the organization was revised in 2015, the news office and communication department were abolished and integrated into the branch. This section also describes the branches that were created in 1988 after being demoted from broadcasting stations.

== Hokkaido ==
Because Hokkaido is in a unique of "one road, one block" (1道1ブロック) environment, it has undergone unique reforms that differ from other regions.

In 2015, license fee sales in Hokkaido were integrated into the Sapporo station sales promotion department, and as a subordinate organization, sales were conducted at each station in Hakodate (south Hokkaido), Asahikawa (north Hokkaido), Obihiro (east Hokkaido), and Sapporo city (central Hokkaido). A center was established to carry out sales-related duties by dividing Hokkaido into four areas, regardless of the area of the broadcasting station.

However, with the arrival of Reiwa, the "department system" of each broadcasting station was changed to a "center system", and it was further reviewed, and finally, as of April 1, 2023.

Broadcasting stations in Hokkaido will be subject to a "three-tier system" different from those in other areas (all stations will be under the control of the Sapporo station, but the three later stations will also be controlled by the first station).

The Sapporo station is organized into two centers: the "Business Management Center" and the "Media Center," and all departments other than the administrative departments at each station are consolidated into the "Media Center." As a result, the "sales center" will be abolished and transferred to the attached station, and the state will become "each station in the prefecture = media center".

The three later stations have transferred the duties of "programming", "announcements", and "receipt fee sales" to the earlier stations, but will continue to carry out other duties and will work in cooperation with the earlier stations.

Broadcasting station			City/ward	Jurisdiction of non-business operations	AM/GTV/FM callsign	ETV callsign
NHK Sapporo Broadcasting Station			Chuo Ward, Sapporo	Ishikari Promotion Branch, Shoshi General Promotion Branch, Sorachi General Promotion Branch, Central South (Some operations include the Muroran station area)	JOIK	JOIB
┣━		NHK Muroran Broadcasting Station	Muroran	Iburi General Promotion Branch, Hidaka Promotion Branch	JOIQ	JOIZ
┣	NHK Hakodate Broadcasting Station		Hakodate	Oshima General Promotion Branch, Hiyama Promotion Branch	JOVK	JOVB
┣	NHK Asahikawa Broadcasting Station		Asahikawa	Kamikawa General Promotion Branch, Rumoi Promotion Branch, Soya General Promotion Branch, Sorachi General Promotion Branch (northern part) (Some operations also include the Kitami Branch area)	JOCG	JOCC
┃	┗	NHK Kitami Broadcasting Station	Kitami	Okhotsk General Promotion Branch	JOKP	JOKD
┣━		NHK Kitami Broadcasting Station	Kitami	Okhotsk General Promotion Branch	JOKP	JOKD
┣	NHK Obihiro Broadcasting Station		Obihiro	Tokachi General Promotion Branch (Some operations include the Kushiro Branch area)	JOOG	JOOC
┃	┗	NHK Kushiro Broadcasting Station	Kushiro	Kushiro General Promotion Branch, Nemuro Promotion Branch	JOPG	JOPC
┗━		NHK Kushiro Broadcasting Station	Kushiro	Kushiro General Promotion Branch, Nemuro Promotion Branch	JOPG	JOPC

== Tohoku ==
The base station, Sendai, has a three-center system: the "Business Management Center", the "Content Center", and the "Viewer Relations Center". In addition, local stations other than the Sendai station have two centers: the "Business Management Planning Center" and the "Contents Center".

Prefecture	Broadcasting station and branch name	City/ward	Jurisdiction/business	AM/GTV/FM callsign	ETV callsign
Miyagi Prefecture	NHK Sendai Broadcasting Station	Aoba Ward, Sendai	Entire prefecture	JOHK	JOHB
Akita Prefecture	NHK Akita Broadcasting Station	Akita	Entire prefecture	JOUK	JOUB
Yamagata Prefecture	NHK Yamagata Broadcasting Station	Yamagata	Murayama region, Mogami region and Okitama region (Entire prefecture)	JOJG	JOJC
Yamagata Prefecture	NHK Tsuruoka Branch	Tsuruoka	Shonai region coverage		
Iwate Prefecture	NHK Morioka Broadcasting Station	Morioka	Entire prefecture	JOQG	JOQC
Fukushima Prefecture	NHK Fukushima Broadcasting Station	Fukushima	Nakadori region (Entire prefecture)	JOFP	JOFD
Fukushima Prefecture	NHK Koriyama Branch	Koriyama	Report on the Nakadori prefecture, the southern part of the prefecture, and the Aizu area		
Fukushima Prefecture	NHK Iwaki Branch	Iwaki	Hamadori coverage		
Aomori Prefecture	NHK Aomori Broadcasting Station	Aomori	Higashiaotsugaru, Shimokita region (Entire prefecture)	JOTG	JOTC
Aomori Prefecture	NHK Hirosaki Branch	Hirosaki	Coverage of the Chuminami Tsugaru, Kita-Gotsugaru, and Nishi-Tsugaru districts		
Aomori Prefecture	NHK Hachinohe Branch	Hachinohe	Nanbu region coverage		

== Kanto-Koshinetsu ==
Kanto and Koshinetsu had been managed by multiple departments at the headquarters for many years, but when the "two-tier system" of broadcasting stations was reinstated in Reiwa, the old "Metropolitan Area Broadcasting Center" was separated from the Broadcasting General Branch → Media General Branch, and became the base broadcasting station for the Kanto and Koshinetsu regions as the Metropolitan Area Station.

Initially, there was only a wide-area management department and a news/program production department, but later the wide-area reception fee sales department was also transferred.

The base stations in the metropolitan area have a three-center system: the "Business Management Center," the "Content Center," and the "Viewer Relations Center." In addition, local stations, excluding metropolitan area stations, have a two-center system: the Business Management Planning Center and the Contents Center. However, the situation for metropolitan area stations is slightly different from other base stations, with the Business Management Center only managing broadcasting stations in the metropolitan area, the Viewer Relations Center only managing viewer duties related to license fees, and the ``Content Management Center only managing broadcast stations in the metropolitan area. "Center" does not include transmitting/receiving technical operations or announcement rooms. Excluded areas will be handled at the headquarters level as before.

Prefecture	Broadcasting station and branch name	City/ward	Jurisdiction/business	AM/GTV/FM callsign	ETV callsign
Tokyo Prefecture	NHK Metropolitan Office	Shibuya Ward	Entire prefecture	JOAK	JOAB
Nagano Prefecture	NHK Nagano Broadcasting Station	Nagano	Hokushin region (Entire prefecture)	JONK	JONB
Nagano Prefecture	NHK Matsumoto Branch	Matsumoto	Reports from the Chunanshin region		
Niigata Prefecture	NHK Niigata Broadcasting Station	Chuo Ward, Niigata	Entire prefecture	JOQK	JOQB
Yamanashi Prefecture	NHK Kofu Broadcasting Station	Kofu	Entire prefecture	JOKG	JOKC
Kanagawa Prefecture	NHK Yokohama Broadcasting Station	Naka Ward, Yokohama	Entire prefecture	JOGP	
Gunma Prefecture	NHK Maebashi Broadcasting Station	Maebashi	Entire prefecture	JOTP	
Ibaraki Prefecture	NHK Mito Broadcasting Station	Mito	Entire prefecture	JOEP	
Chiba Prefecture	NHK Chiba Broadcasting Station	Chuo Ward, Chiba	Entire prefecture	JOMP	
Tochigi Prefecture	NHK Utsunomiya Broadcasting Station	Utsunomiya	Entire prefecture	JOBP	
Saitama Prefecture	NHK Saitama Broadcasting Station	Urawa Ward, Saitama	Entire prefecture	JOLP	

== Chubu ==
The base station, Nagoya, has a three-center system: the "Business Management Center," the "Content Center," and the "Viewer Relations Center." In addition, local stations other than the Nagoya station have a two-center system: the Business Management Planning Center and the Contents Center.。

Prefecture	Broadcasting station and branch name	City/ward	Jurisdiction/business	AM/GTV/FM callsign	ETV callsign
Aichi Prefecture	NHK Nagoya Broadcasting Station	Higashi Ward, Nagoya	West of the prefecture (Entire prefecture)	JOCK	JOCB
Aichi Prefecture	NHK Toyohashi Branch	Toyohashi	East of the prefecture		
Ishikawa Prefecture	NHK Kanazawa Broadcasting Station	Kanazawa	Entire prefecture	JOJK	JOJB
Shizuoka Prefecture	NHK Shizuoka Broadcasting Station	Suruga Ward, Shizuoka	Central, eastern and Izu regions (Entire prefecture)	JOPK	JOPB
Shizuoka Prefecture	NHK Hamamatsu Broadcasting Station	Chuo Ward, Hamamatsu	West of the prefecture		
Fukui Prefecture	NHK Fukui Broadcasting Station	Fukui	Entire prefecture	JOFG	JOFC
Toyama Prefecture	NHK Toyama Broadcasting Station	Toyama	Entire prefecture	JOIG	JOIC
Mie Prefecture	NHK Tsu Broadcasting Station	Tsu	Entire prefecture	JONP	
Gifu Prefecture	NHK Gifu Broadcasting Station	Gifu	Mino region (Entire prefecture)	JOOP	
Gifu Prefecture	NHK Takayama Broadcasting Station	Takayama	Hida region		

== Kinki ==
The Osaka station, which is the base station, has a three-center system: "Business Management Center," "Content Center," and "Viewer Relations Center." Because the Osaka Station is positioned as a backup for the headquarters, some departments are Leave the system behind. In addition, local stations other than the Osaka station have two centers: the "Business Management Planning Center" and the "Contents Center".

Prefecture	Broadcasting station and branch name	City/ward	Jurisdiction/business	AM/GTV/FM callsign	ETV callsign
Osaka Prefecture	NHK Osaka Broadcasting Station	Chuo Ward, Osaka	Entire prefecture	JOBK	JOBB
Kyoto Prefecture	NHK Kyoto Broadcasting Station	Nakagyo Ward, Kyoto	Entire prefecture	JOOK	
Hyogo Prefecture	NHK Kobe Broadcasting Station	Chuo Ward, Kobe	Southeastern part, Awaji Island (Entire prefecture)	JOPP	
Hyogo Prefecture	NHK Himeji Branch	Himeji	Southwest, central and northern regions of the prefecture		
Wakayama Prefecture	NHK Wakayama Broadcasting Station	Wakayama	Entire prefecture	JORP	
Nara Prefecture	NHK Nara Broadcasting Station	Nara	Entire prefecture	JOUP	
Shiga Prefecture	NHK Otsu Broadcasting Station	Otsu	Entire prefecture	JOQP	

== Chugoku ==
The base station, Hiroshima, has a three-center system: the "Business Management Center," the "Content Center," and the "Viewer Relations Center." In addition, local stations, excluding the Hiroshima station, have a two-center system: the "Business Management Planning Center" and the "Contents Center".

Prefecture	Broadcasting station and branch name	City/ward	Jurisdiction/business	AM/GTV/FM callsign	ETV callsign
Hiroshima Prefecture	NHK Hiroshima Broadcasting Station	Naka Ward, Hiroshima	Southwest, Geihoku (Entire prefecture)	JOFK	JOFB
Hiroshima Prefecture	NHK Fukuyama Branch	Fukuyama	Fukuyama/Ozo, Bihoku, Northeastern part		
Okayama Prefecture	NHK Okayama Broadcasting Station	Kita Ward, Okayama	Entire prefecture	JOKK	JOKB
Shimane Prefecture	NHK Matsue Broadcasting Station	Matsue	Entire prefecture	JOTK	JOTB
Tottori Prefecture	NHK Tottori Broadcasting Station	Tottori	Former Inaba Province (Entire prefecture)	JOLG	JOLC
Tottori Prefecture	NHK Yonago Branch	Yonago	Former Hoki Province		
Yamaguchi Prefecture	NHK Yamaguchi Broadcasting Station	Yamaguchi	All areas except Shimonoseki City (Entire prefecture)	JOUG	JOUC
Yamaguchi Prefecture	NHK Shimonoseki Branch	Shimonoseki	Shimonoseki City		

== Shikoku ==
Due to Shikoku's small size, the structure of the Matsuyama station, which is the base station, is different from other base stations, and has a two-center system, the "Business Management Planning Center" and the "Contents Center", which is similar to that of local stations.

Prefecture	Broadcasting station and branch name	City/ward	Jurisdiction/business	AM/GTV/FM callsign	ETV callsign
Ehime Prefecture	NHK Matsuyama Broadcasting Station	Matsuyama	Entire prefecture	JOZK	JOZB
Kochi Prefecture	NHK Kochi Broadcasting Station	Kochi	Entire prefecture	JORK	JORB
Tokushima Prefecture	NHK Tokushima Broadcasting Station	Tokushima	Entire prefecture	JOXK	JOXB
Kagawa Prefecture	NHK Takamatsu Broadcasting Station	Takamatsu	Entire prefecture	JOHP	JOHD

== Kyushu ==
The base station, Fukuoka station, has a three-center system: "Business Management Center", "Content Center", and "Viewer Relations Center". In addition, local stations, excluding the Fukuoka station, have a two-center system: the "Business Management Planning Center" and the "Contents Center."

Prefecture	Broadcasting station and branch name	City/ward	Jurisdiction/business	AM/GTV/FM callsign	ETV callsign
Fukuoka Prefecture	NHK Fukuoka Broadcasting Station	Chuo Ward, Fukuoka	Fukuoka area and Chikugo area	JOLK	JOLB
Fukuoka Prefecture	NHK Kitakyushu Broadcasting Station	Kokurakita Ward, Kitakyushu	Kitakyushu district and Chikuho district	JOSK	JOSB
Kumamoto Prefecture	NHK Kumamoto Broadcasting Station	Chuo Ward, Kumamoto	Entire prefecture	JOGK	JOGB
Nagasaki Prefecture	NHK Nagasaki Broadcasting Station	Nagasaki	Southwest, Goto (Entire prefecture)	JOAG	JOAC
Nagasaki Prefecture	NHK Sasebo Branch	Sasebo	Northern, western, Iki/Tsushima		
Kagoshima Prefecture	NHK Kagoshima Broadcasting Station	Kagoshima	Entire prefecture	JOHG	JOHC
Miyazaki Prefecture	NHK Miyazaki Broadcasting Station	Miyazaki	Entire prefecture	JOMG	JOMC
Oita Prefecture	NHK Oita Broadcasting Station	Oita	Entire prefecture	JOIP	JOID
Saga Prefecture	NHK Saga Broadcasting Station	Saga	Entire prefecture	JOSP	JOSD
Okinawa Prefecture	NHK Okinawa Broadcasting Station	Naha	Entire prefecture	JOAP	JOAD

== Overseas bureaus ==
NHK also has a network of 28 overseas bureaus that gather news for both domestic and international services. Information accurate as of the end of the 2021-2022 fiscal year.

=== Asia-Pacific ===
- Bangkok (NHK General Bureau for Asia)
- Manila
- Jakarta
- Hanoi
- New Delhi
- Islamabad
- Sydney
- Seoul
- Beijing
- Shanghai
- Hong Kong
- Taipei

=== Europe, the Middle East and Africa ===
- Paris (NHK General Bureau for Europe)
- London
- Brussels
- Berlin
- Cairo
- Istanbul
- Dubai
- Johannesburg
- Jerusalem
- Tehran
- Moscow
- Vladivostok

=== Americas ===
- New York (NHK General Bureau for America)
- Washington
- Los Angeles
- São Paulo
