= NHK Fukuoka Broadcasting Station =

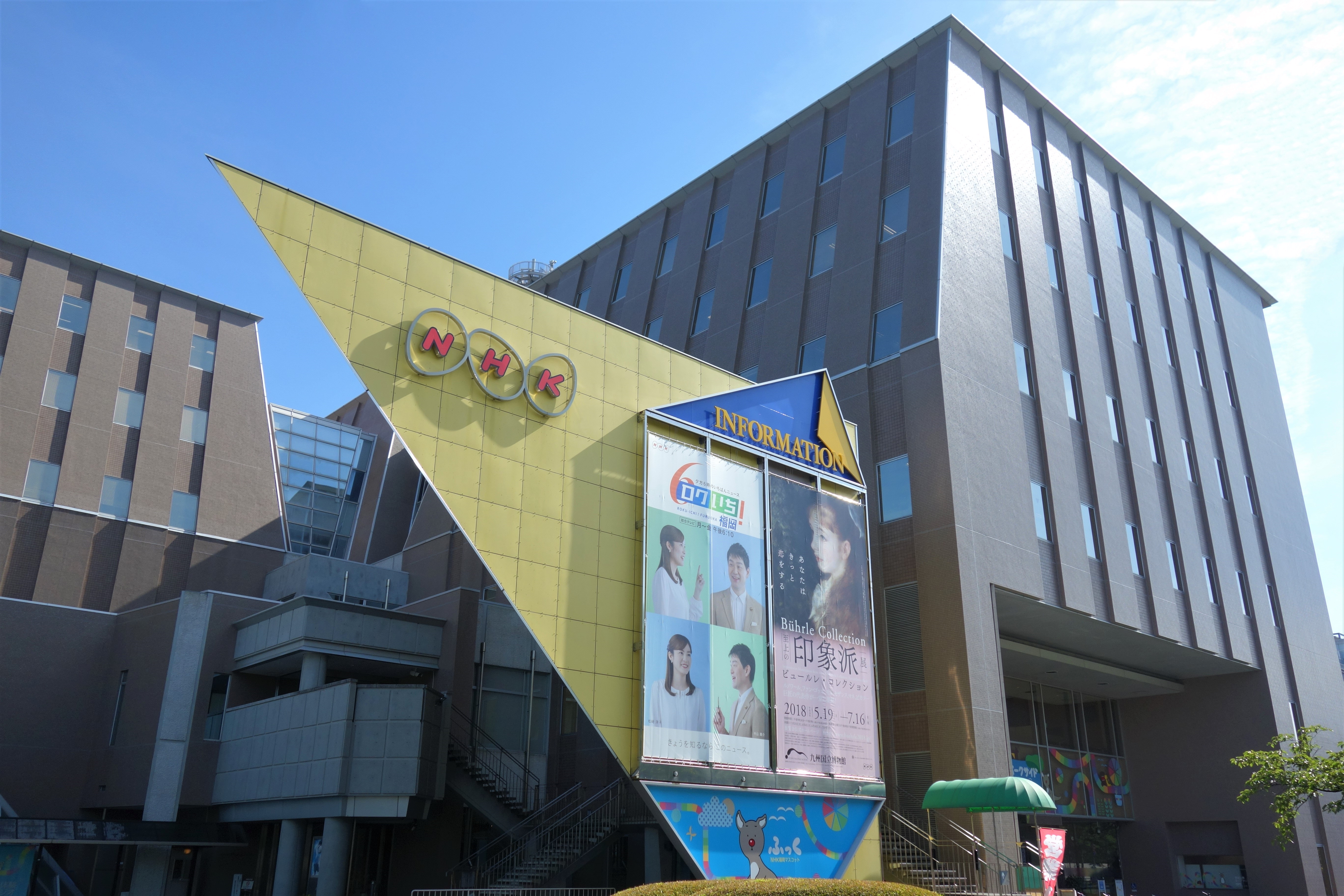
Head office

The NHK Fukuoka Broadcasting Station (NHK福岡放送局, NHK Fukuoka Hōsō Kyoku) is a unit of the NHK that oversees terrestrial broadcasting in most of Fukuoka Prefecture. It is the main NHK station in the Kyushu region with the exception of Kitakyushu which is served by its own station. The Fukuoka station is used as an emergency facility in the event that the stations in Tokyo and Osaka are not operational due to serious emergencies.

== History ==
Station JOLK opened on September 16, 1928, becoming the second radio station in Kyushu, after the station in Kumamoto, which opened earlier in the year. It was located near the New Iwataya Building at the beginning, but moved on December 6, 1930 to facilities of its own, to the first building that had an air conditioning system installed. This date is considered to be the beginning of full-time local broadcasts from Fukuoka. Radio 2 broadcasts began on September 1, 1946, but using the JOLK2 callsign, switching to JOLB on July 1, 1948.

JOLK-TV started broadcasting on March 21, 1956. JOLB-TV followed on September 1, 1962.

Organizational changes at NHK prompted Fukuoka to become the main station in the Kyushu area on June 5, 1992, replacing Kumamoto in its status. On November 4, it began broadcasting from its current building at Ropponmatsu.

On September 1, 2016, Fukuoka programs were added to NHK's Rajiru online service. On April 12, 2018, its programs were available on radiko. Local programming was added to NHK+ on March 4, 2021, on June 30, 2024, it signed a memorandum of understanding with four commercial stations (RKB, KBC, TNC and FBS) on disaster prevention. The agreement also included the Hiroshima station, in which its helicopters are used to cover disaster emergencies.
