= NHK Kushiro Broadcasting Station =

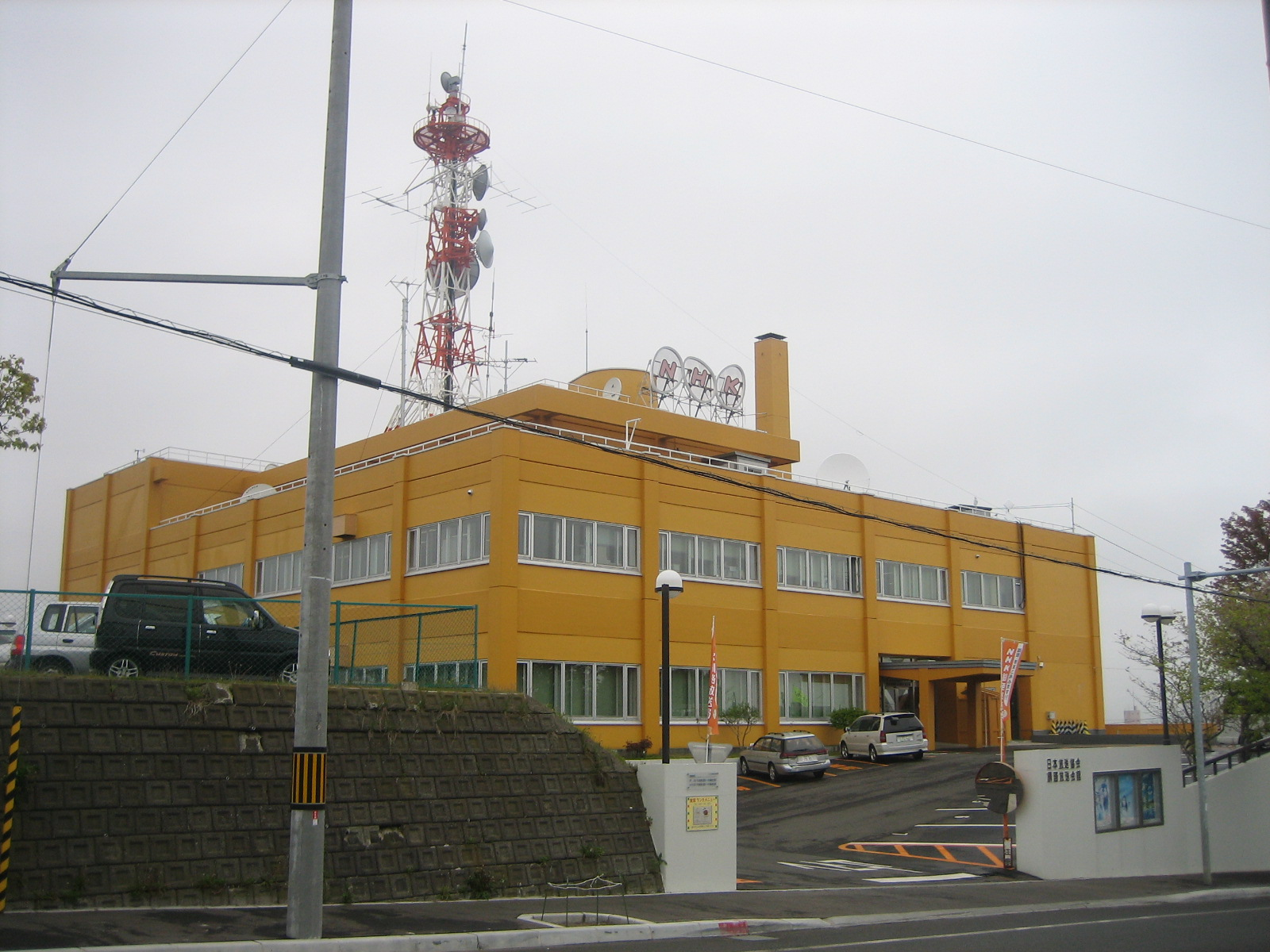
NHK Kushiro Broadcasting Station

The NHK Kushiro Broadcasting Station (NHK釧路放送局, NHK Kushiro Hōsō Kyoku) is a unit of the NHK that oversees terrestrial broadcasting in far eastern Hokkaido Prefecture, based in Kushiro. Since 2022, it is subordinate to the NHK Obihiro Broadcasting Station.

== History ==
The station started broadcasting in 1938, call sign JOPG, on 1010kc. On December 28, 1959, television broadcasts began (JOGP-TV) from the Midorigaoka transmitter, which it used until the start of digital terrestrial broadcasts. To celebrate its 45th anniversary, a song was released, Kushirogawa.

Until 2022, it still broadcast its local programs on both radio and television, but upon becoming subordinate to Obihiro, the number of staff working at the station fell. This was as part of a plan to streamline operations in eastern Hokkaido under one unit for both stations. Although it would maintain the seven-station system, there were no mergers. This rearrangement caused concern from locals in their respective areas, to an extent where a former NHK staff member thought that this would inevitably lead to all broadcasting to Hokkaido being done from Sapporo.
