= NHK Hachinohe Branch =

The NHK Hachinohe Branch (NHK八戸支局, NHK Hachinohe Shikyoku) is a division of the NHK Aomori Broadcasting Station which is in charge of news gathering operations in Hachinohe.

== History ==
The station started broadcasting on June 9, 1942, with no callsign and dependent on NHK's Sendai station, being nothing more than a temporary station. The station became a permanent broadcasting station on June 1, 1951. JOTQ broadcast on 900kc and JOTZ on 1300kc.

On September 20, 1960, the station started television broadcasts. NHK Educational TV followed on September 1, 1962. NHK-G broadcast on VHF channel 7 and NHK-E on VHF channel 9.

On June 22, 1988, the station was downsized to a branch. Digital terrestrial broadcasts spread to Hachinohe on August 1, 2006.
