= NHK Muroran Broadcasting Station =

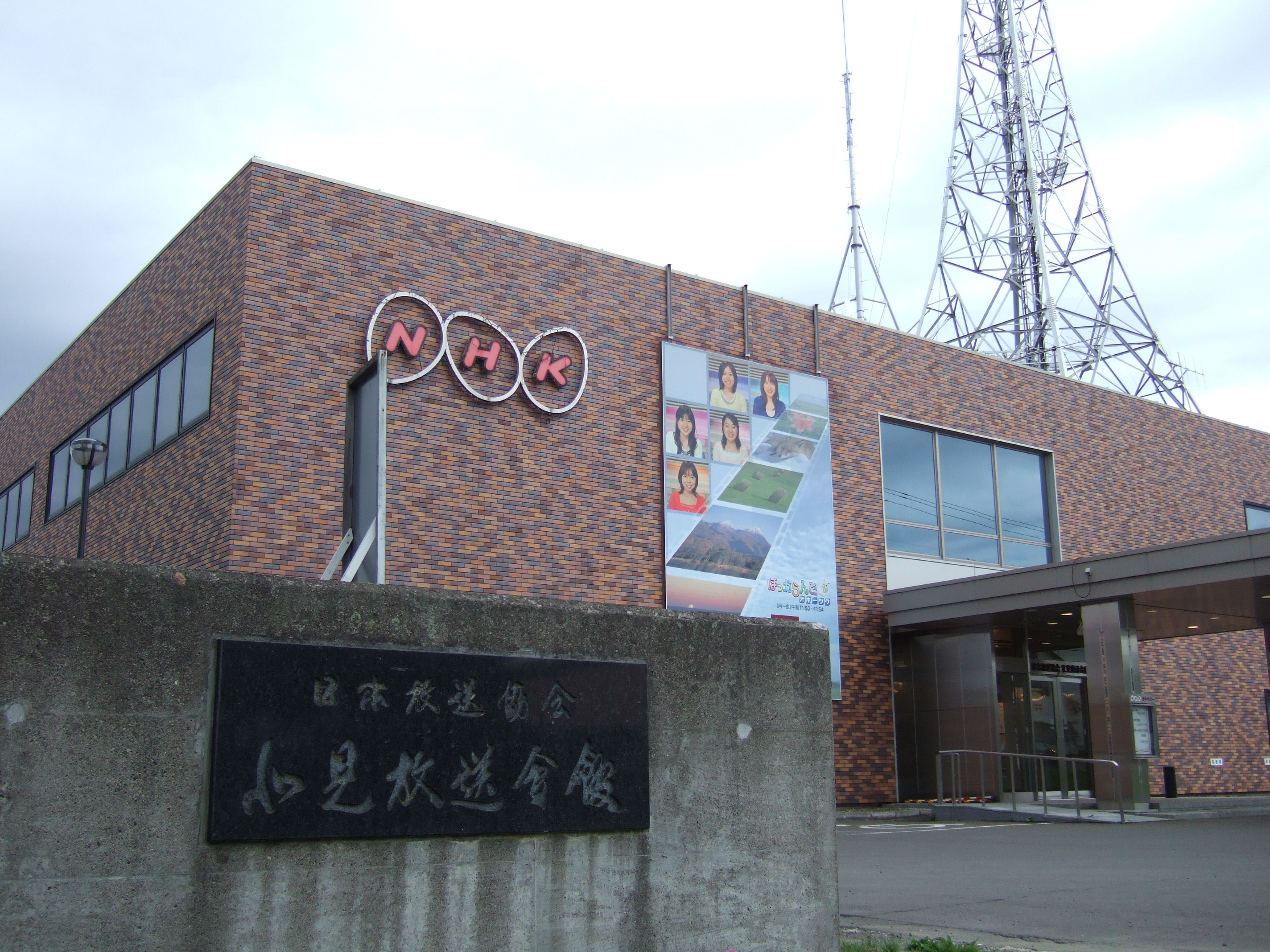
NHK Muroran Broadcasting Station

The NHK Muroran Broadcasting Station (NHK室蘭放送局, NHK Muroran Hōsō Kyoku) is a unit of the NHK that oversees terrestrial broadcasting in central Hokkaido Prefecture, based in Muroran. Since 2022, it is subordinate to the NHK Sapporo Broadcasting Station.

The station uses the JOIQ callsign for Radio 1, NHK FM and NHK General TV and JOIZ for Radio 2 and NHK Educational TV.

== History ==
The station was established in October 1941 as the Muroran Office of the Sapporo Broadcasting Station, commencing broadcasts on February 21, 1942. During the war, it was used as a provisional war station. In 1952, it was promoted to a broadcasting station. Until 1982, the callsign used was JOIU for Radio 1, FM and NHK-G and JOIT for Radio 2 and NHK-E. The callsign JOIU is currently used by FM Okinawa, which started broadcasting in 1984. A special logo was designed for its 80th anniversary in 2022.

Beginning fiscal 2022, it became subordinate to the Sapporo station forming the Central Hokkaido unit of NHK's Hokkaido branch. Some of the Muroran station's departments shut down in fiscal 2023, causing some work to be done from Sapporo.
