= NHK Yonago Branch =

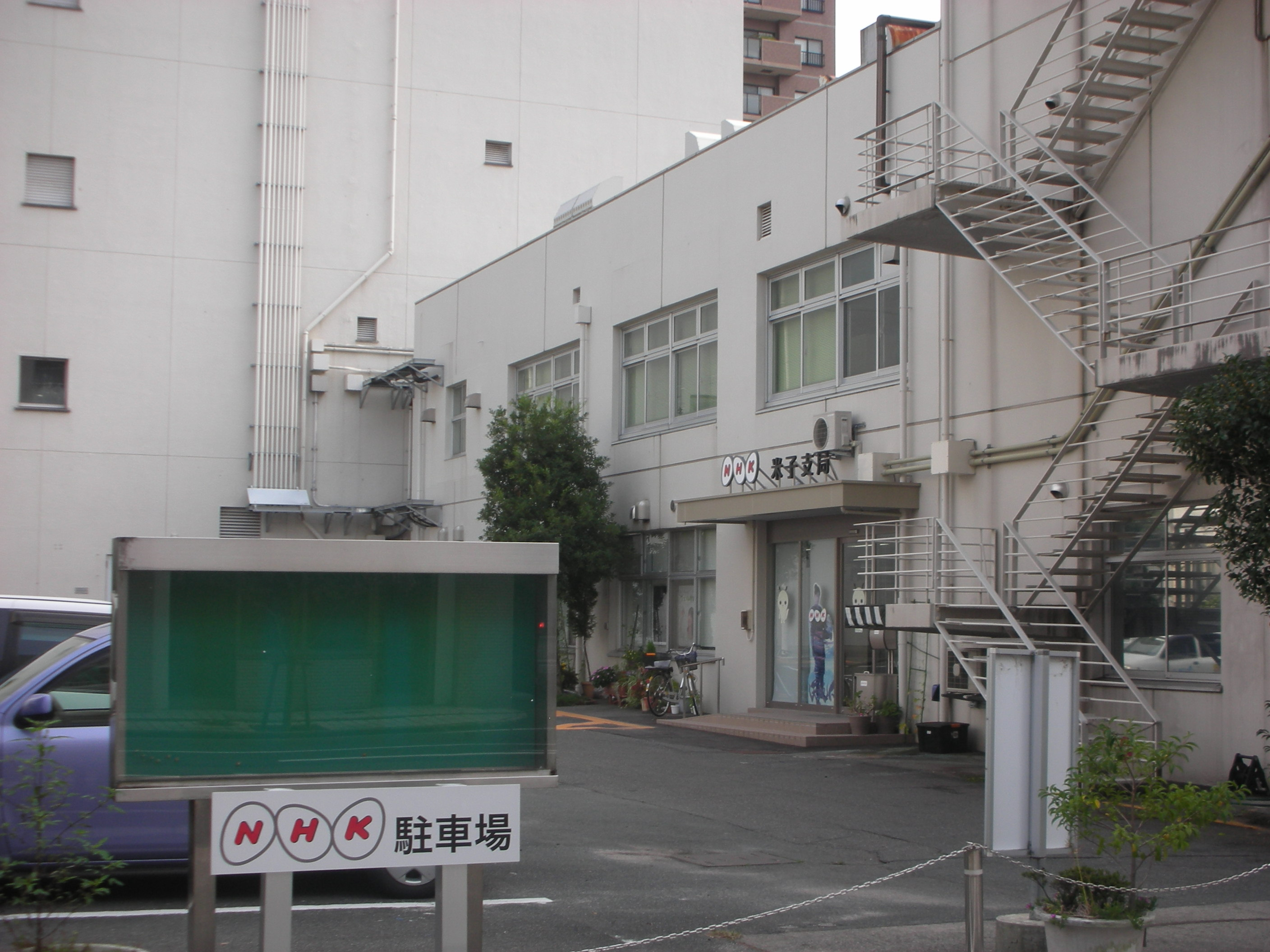
Former building

The NHK Yonago Branch (NHK米子支局, NHK Yonago Shikyoku) is a division of the NHK Tottori Broadcasting Station which is in charge of news gathering operations in Yonago and the western side of Tottori Prefecture, corresponding to the former Hoki Province. It used to operate a full radio and television service until 1988.

== History ==
Station JOLQ started broadcasting on October 24, 1954, operating on 1200kc. Its initial director was Hideo Minasaki.

After the closure of production in 1984 and the downsizing to a mere branch, the building was put for sale in 2009 to NTT, who only inherited the transmitter.

Yonago has no local terrestrial TV channels, as it depends on news coverage coming from either Tottori or Matsue. The city has a local cable company, Chukai TV, but as of 2007, a small proportion of its subscribers watched its local channels on a regular basis.
