= NHK Nara Broadcasting Station =

NHK Nara Television (JOUP-DTV)
Nara Prefecture; Japan
- City: Nara
- Channels: Digital: 31 (UHF); Virtual: 1

Programming
- Affiliations: NHK General TV

Ownership
- Owner: NHK (Japan Broadcasting Corporation)

History
- First air date: July 3, 1972
- Former call signs: JOUP-TV (1972–2011)
- Former channel numbers: Analog: 51 (VHF, 1971–2011)

Technical information
- Licensing authority: MIC

NHK Nara Broadcasting Station (NHK奈良放送局, NHK Nara Hōsō Kyoku) is a unit of the NHK that oversees terrestrial broadcasting in Nara Prefecture. Locally, it only broadcasts NHK FM and NHK General TV. NHK Radio 1, NHK Radio 2 and NHK Educational TV are all dependent on Osaka.

== Overview ==
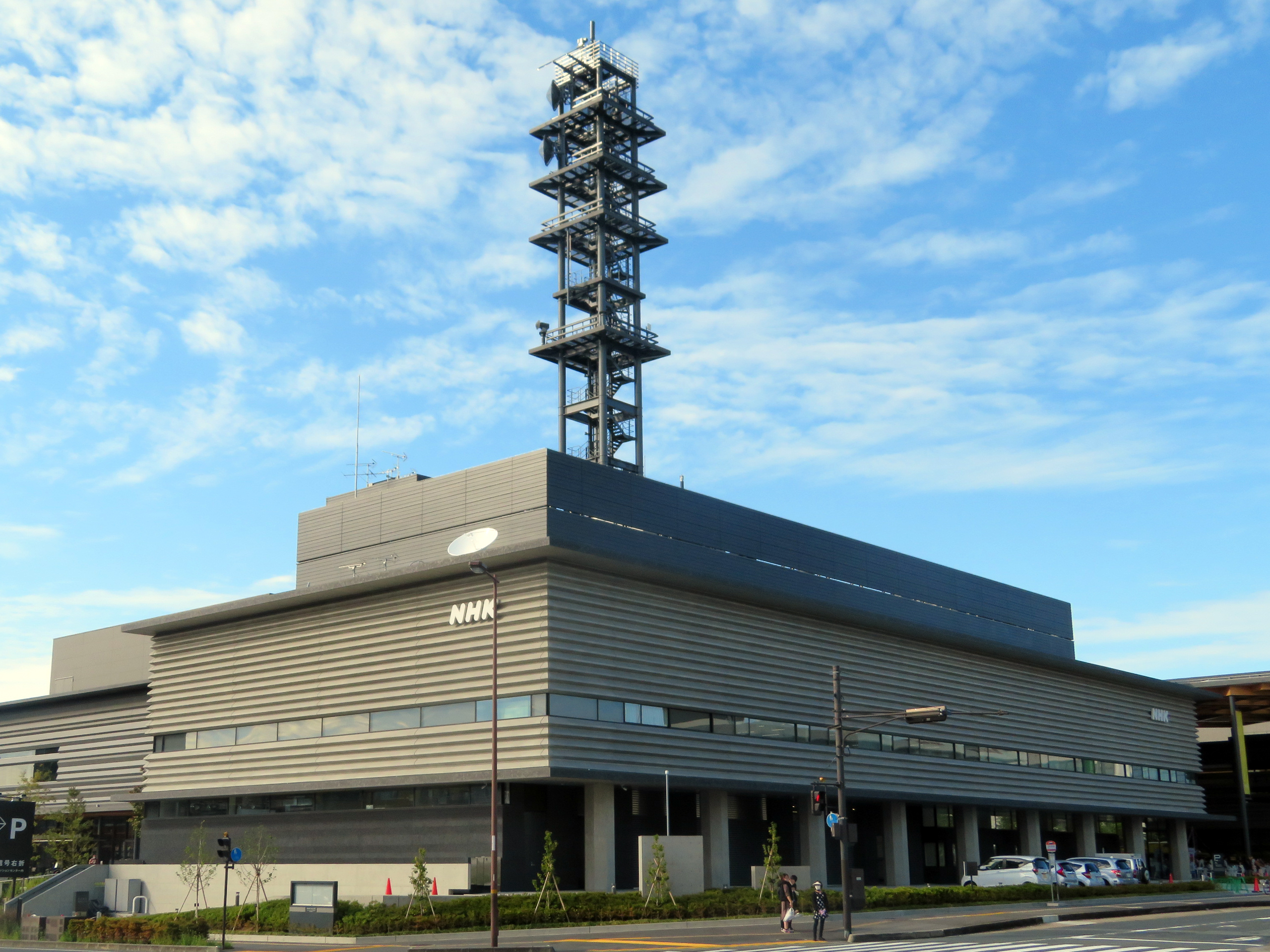
NHK Nara building

The station opened as an office of the Osaka station on September 16, 1937. Full local broadcasts did not begin until 1971, when NHK FM opened its local station (JOUP-FM, 87.4 MHz), followed by JOUP-TV in 1972 (channel 51).

On September 28, 2020, NHK Nara relocated to its current facilities at Sanjo-oji. Local programming was added to NHK+ on October 3, 2022.

== See also ==
- List of NHK broadcasting stations
