= NHK Shimonoseki Branch =

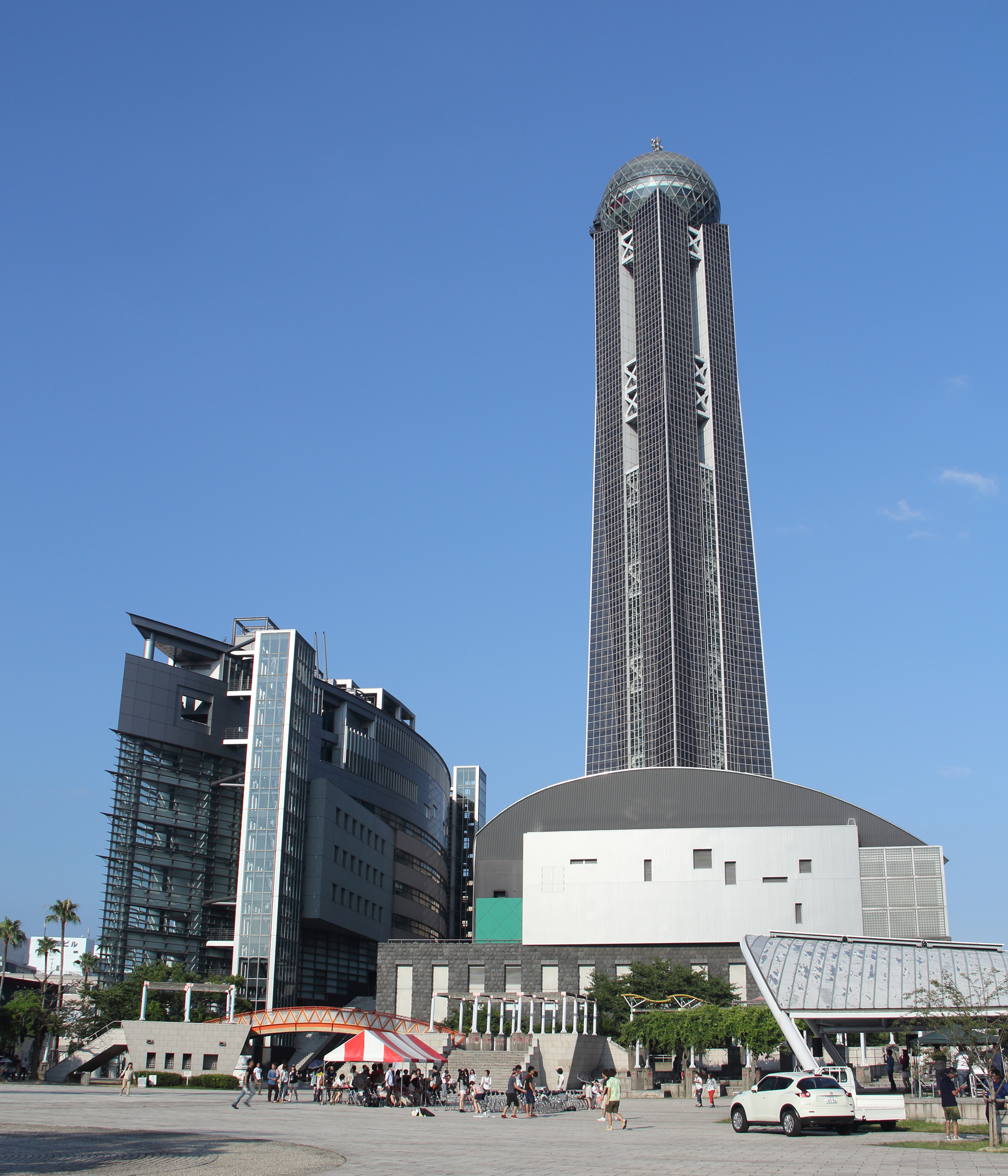
The Yamaguchi International Synthesis Center, where the branch operates

The NHK Shimonoseki Branch (NHK下関支局, NHK Shimonoseki Shikyoku) is a division of the NHK Yamaguchi Broadcasting Station which is in charge of news gathering operations in Shimonoseki and the western side of Yamaguchi Prefecture. It used to operate a full radio and television service until 1988. Its offices are located at the Yamaguchi International Synthesis Center (山口県国際総合センター), where Yamaguchi Asahi Broadcasting also has its local offices.

== History ==
The station started on June 3, 1956, using the callsign JOUI, AM 1160 with a 47-meter antenna and a 100-watt output. The station covered Shimonoseki, Moji, Kitakyushu, Toyoura, Asa and Mine. Broadcasts from a dedicated studio began in 1962, while television broadcasts started in 1970, on UHF.

On November 11, 1982, JOUI became JOUQ. In 1988, the station was demoted to a mere branch office.
