= NHK Hakodate Broadcasting Station =

Unit of the Japan Broadcasting Corporation

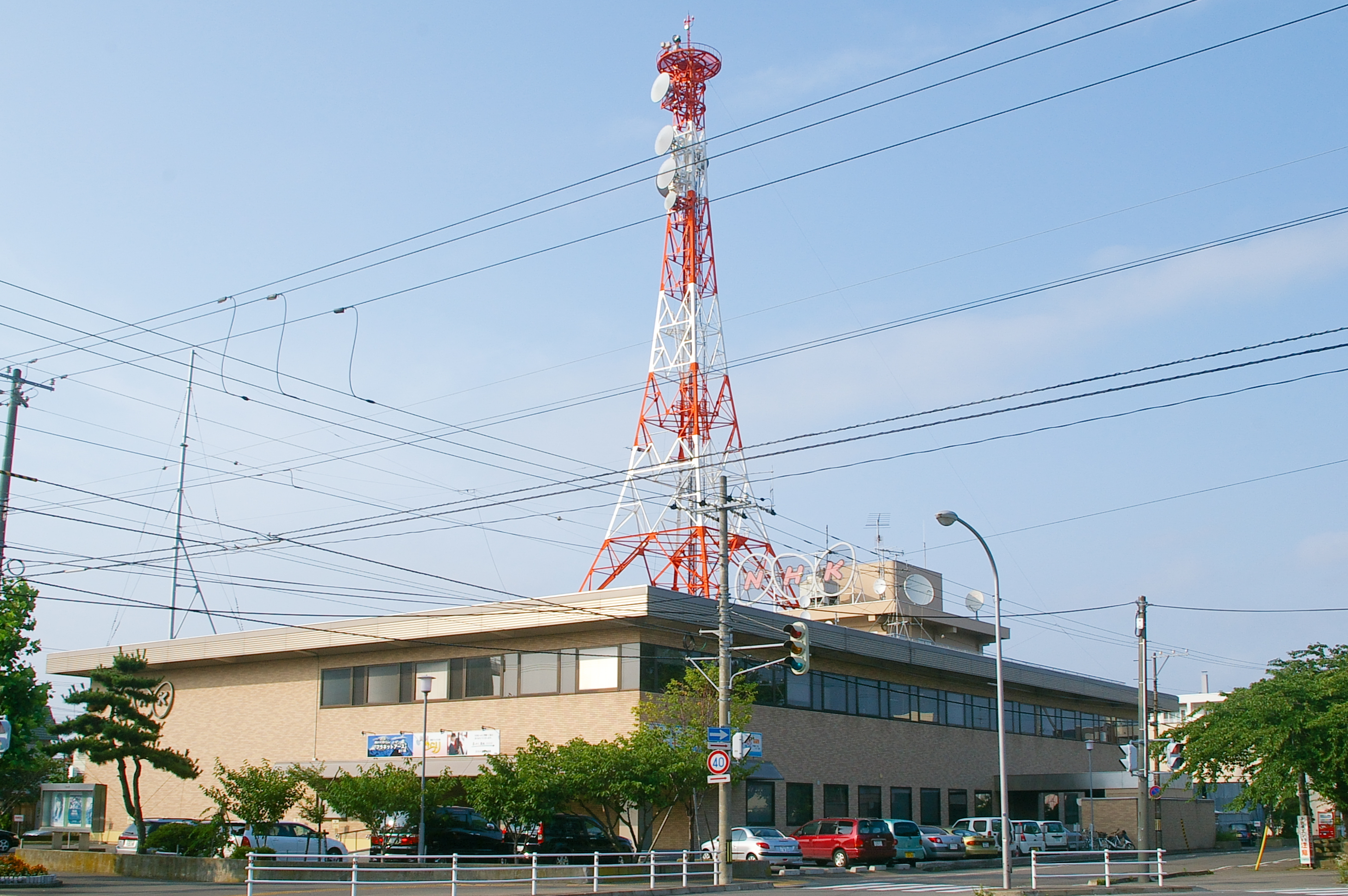
Former NHK Sapporo Broadcasting Station/New Building

The NHK Hakodate Broadcasting Station (NHK函館放送局, NHK Hakodate Hōsō Kyoku) is a unit of the NHK that oversees terrestrial broadcasting in Hakodate, in the southern tip of Hokkaido Prefecture.

== History ==
Station JOVK started broadcasting on February 6, 1932. Work for television broadcasts was underway in 1956, starting on March 22, 1957. Until March 25, 1967, it was located in Motomachi.

When digital terrestrial television started in southern Hokkaido in 2006, a new transmitter was installed at Sokuryō-zan, meaning that the reception of its local programming can be seen in parts of Muroran.

The Kameda News Base was built in 2014 adjacent to the transmitter the station operates to relay JOVK and JOVB at Kameda.

As part of a reduction plan imposed by NHK in Hokkaido to limit to four core regions, Hakodate was promoted as the South Hokkaido unit of the wider Hokkaido branch. These measures were put into place at the beginning of fiscal 2022. Unlike the three other units, Hakodate has no adjacent subordinate unit. However, some of its functions were transferred to Sapporo beginning in fiscal 2023.

Relocation work was announced in 2021, with work starting in 2023 and it was expected to be operational in 2025.
