= NHK Wakayama Broadcasting Station =

NHK Wakayama Television (JORP-DTV)
Wakayama Prefecture; Japan
- City: Wakayama
- Channels: Digital: 23 (UHF); Virtual: 1

Programming
- Affiliations: NHK General TV

Ownership
- Owner: NHK (Japan Broadcasting Corporation)

History
- First air date: May 31, 1971
- Former call signs: JORP-TV (1971–2011)
- Former channel numbers: Analog: 32 (UHF, 1971–2011)

Technical information
- Licensing authority: MIC

The NHK Wakayama Broadcasting Station (NHK和歌山放送局, NHK Wakayama Hoso Kyoku) is a unit of the NHK that oversees terrestrial broadcasting in Wakayama Prefecture. Locally, it only broadcasts NHK FM and NHK General TV. NHK Radio 1, NHK Radio 2 and NHK Educational TV are all dependent on Osaka.

== Overview ==
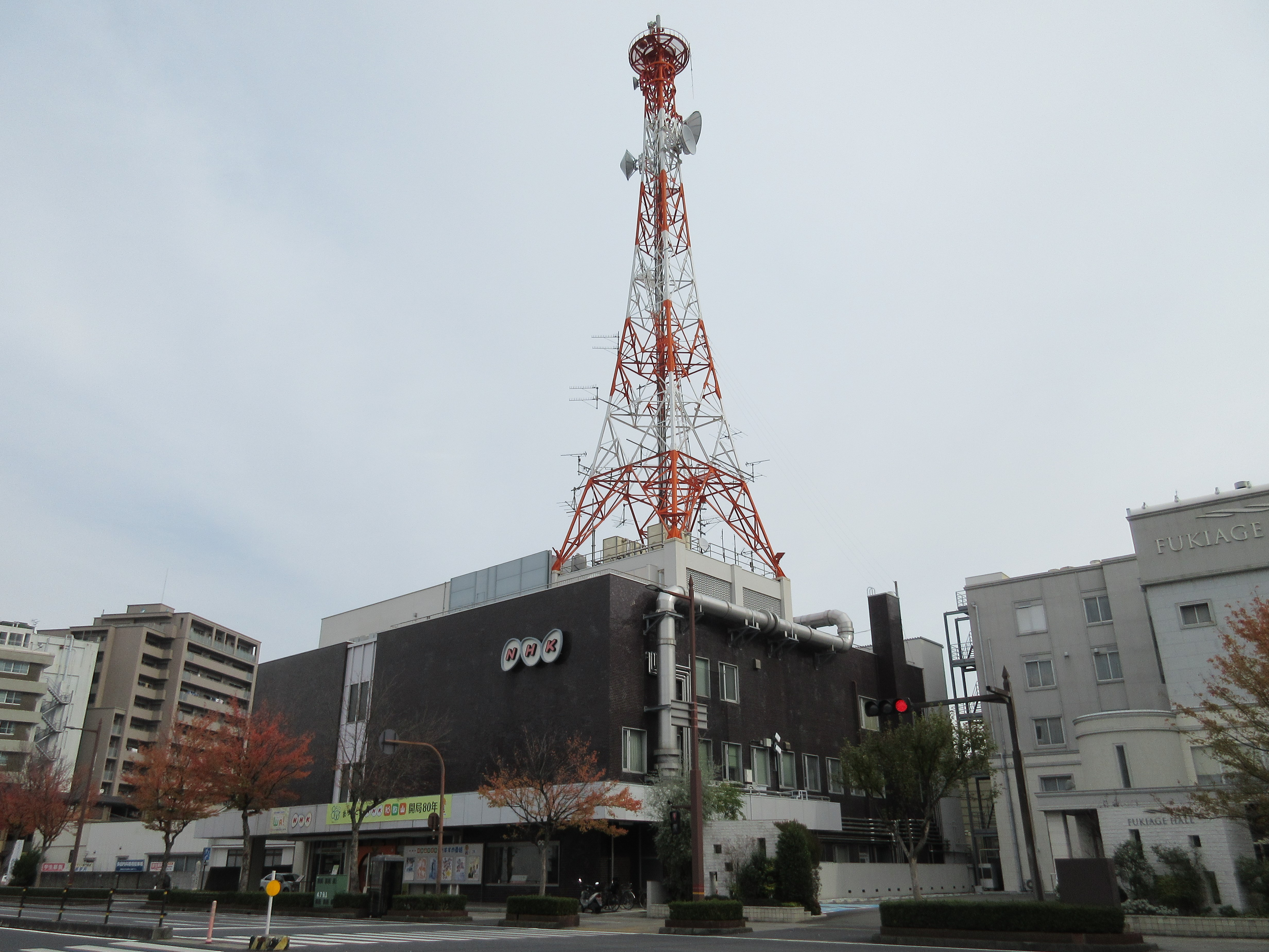
NHK Wakayama building

The Wakayama Branch of the Osaka Central Broadcasting Station opened in March 1936 at Daidokoromachi, Mikimachi, Wakayama City. Subsequently, radio broadcasts began in November 1942 from the Shingu transmitting station, with an output of 50 watts. The transmitter was destroyed in a fire in July 1945 and was relocated to Kuroda. In May 1948, the Wakayama Branch Office became subordinate to the Osaka Broadcasting Station. The branch became a broadcasting station in July 1951 while a TV relay station was inaugurated at Kainan in September 1957, relaying JOBK-TV.

In September 1964, the first UHF relay station in the prefecture was installed in Gobo, followed by an FM transmitter in Kainan in December 1969. JORP-FM (output: 500 watts) started broadcasting in May 1970, while JORP-TV (channel 32) started broadcasting on May 31, 1971. On August 8, 1980, TV stereo broadcasts began. In April 1982, local television news began (News Wide 630). This was followed in March 2005 by Wakayama 845 to cover the 8:45pm slot.

NHK+ added local programming on October 3, 2022.

In December 2021, NHK began evaluating a proposal to start building a new office for the Wakayama station from 2027, expected to be finished in 2027. The old one will be demolished.

== See also ==
- List of NHK broadcasting stations
