= NHK Niigata Broadcasting Station =

NHK broadcasting station in Niigata Prefecture

The NHK Niigata Broadcasting Station (NHK新潟放送局, NHK Niigata Hoso Kyoku) is a unit of the NHK that oversees terrestrial broadcasting in Niigata Prefecture.

== History ==
Radio station JOQK made its test broadcasts on October 25, 1931, and started regular broadcasts on November 11 the same year. It was the thirteenth NHK station and radio station overall in Japan to start broadcasts. Initially broadcasting on 625kc, the frequency changed to 800kc on March 7, 1932, later on June 7, 920kc. NHK Radio 2 (initially sharing the JOQK calls) made its first broadcast in 1946; the station adopted the JOQB calls in 1948.

Television broadcasts from Mount Yahiko started on December 1, 1958, on VHF channel 2. To prevent Sporadic E propagation from the Utsukushigahara transmitter in Nagano Prefecture, the station moved to channel 8 on April 1, 1962. NHK Educational Television (JOQB-TV) started broadcasting on November 1, 1962, on channel 12.

A snowstorm hit the prefecture in January 1963, forcing NHK to build an emergency reporting facility in Sanjo. TV color broadcasts started on December 16, 1963, with NTT's eastern circuit achieving colorization of television stations at this time. NHK Educational TV followed on April 1, 1964.

Niigata programming was added to NHK+ in October 2022.
