= NHK Miyazaki Broadcasting Station =

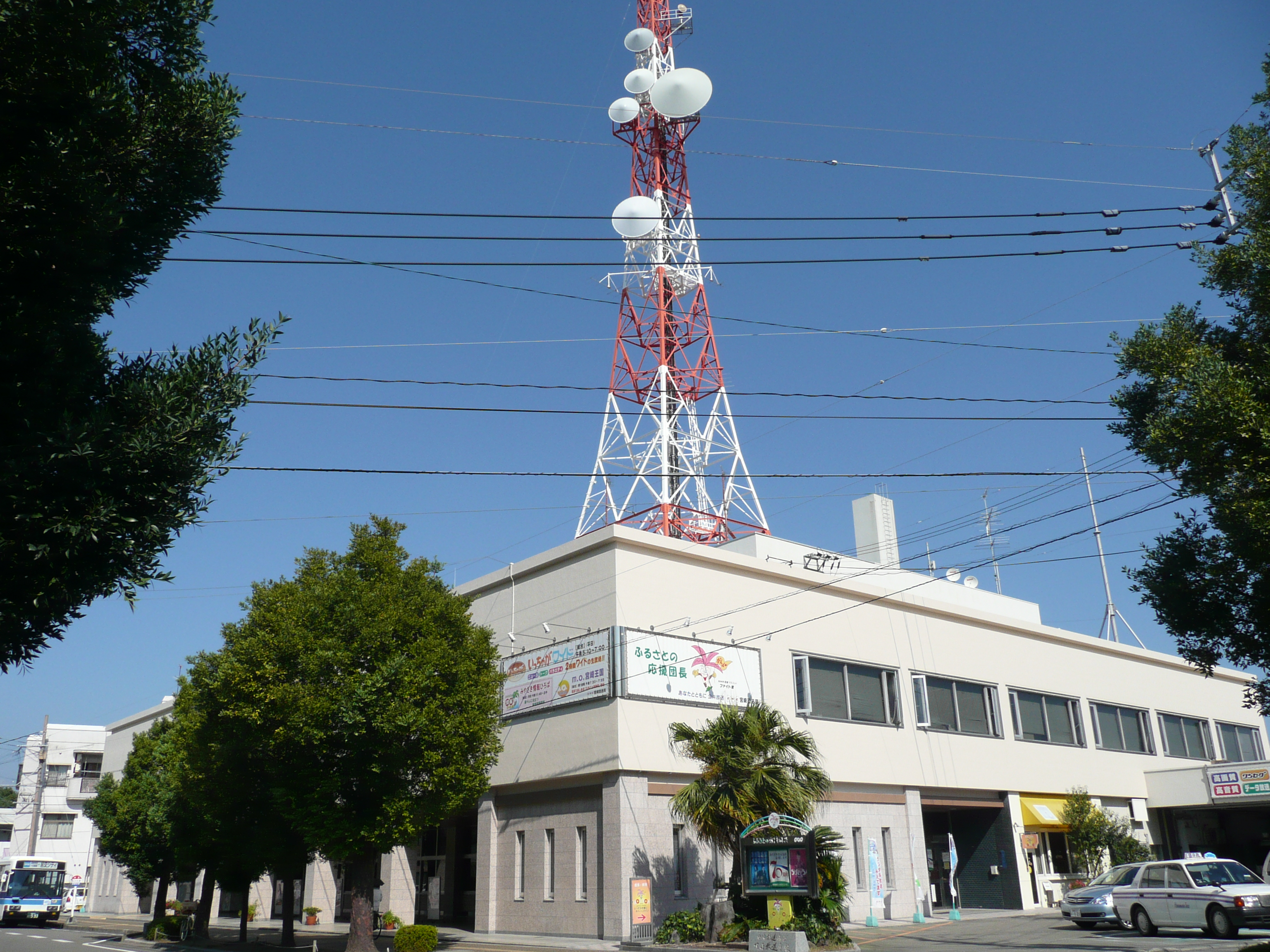
NHK Miyazaki

The NHK Miyazaki Broadcasting Station (NHK宮崎放送局, NHK Nagasaki Hoso Kyoku) is a unit of the NHK that oversees terrestrial broadcasting in Miyazaki Prefecture.

== History ==
JOMG (the current NHK Radio 1 station) opened on April 19, 1937. Radio 2 (JOMC) started on March 28, 1950.

Television broadcasts started on July 1, 1960, for General TV (JOMG-TV) and December 1, 1963, for Educational TV FM broadcasts started on July 1, 1964.

From April 2018, all local news and weather information on weekends and holidays (including year-end and New Year holidays) were unified into the Kyushu-Okinawa news block from Fukuoka, except for elections and disasters, in principle, for both TV and radio. Local news and weather information from Miyazaki were available only on weekdays. From the April reorganization in 2022, local news and weather information in the prefecture will be broadcast only on Saturdays, Sundays, and holidays at 18:45 (TV and radio outside of this time zone are mainly used during long holidays and during the Obon holidays. During the year-end and New Year period, as a general rule, Kyushu-Okinawa block news from Fukuoka will be broadcast as usual).

NHK+ added Miyazaki programming on May 15, 2023.

Television transmissions are carried out from the Wanizukayama Digital Television Transmitting Station in Tano-cho, Miyazaki City.
