= NHK Morioka Broadcasting Station =

Unit of the Japan Broadcasting Corporation

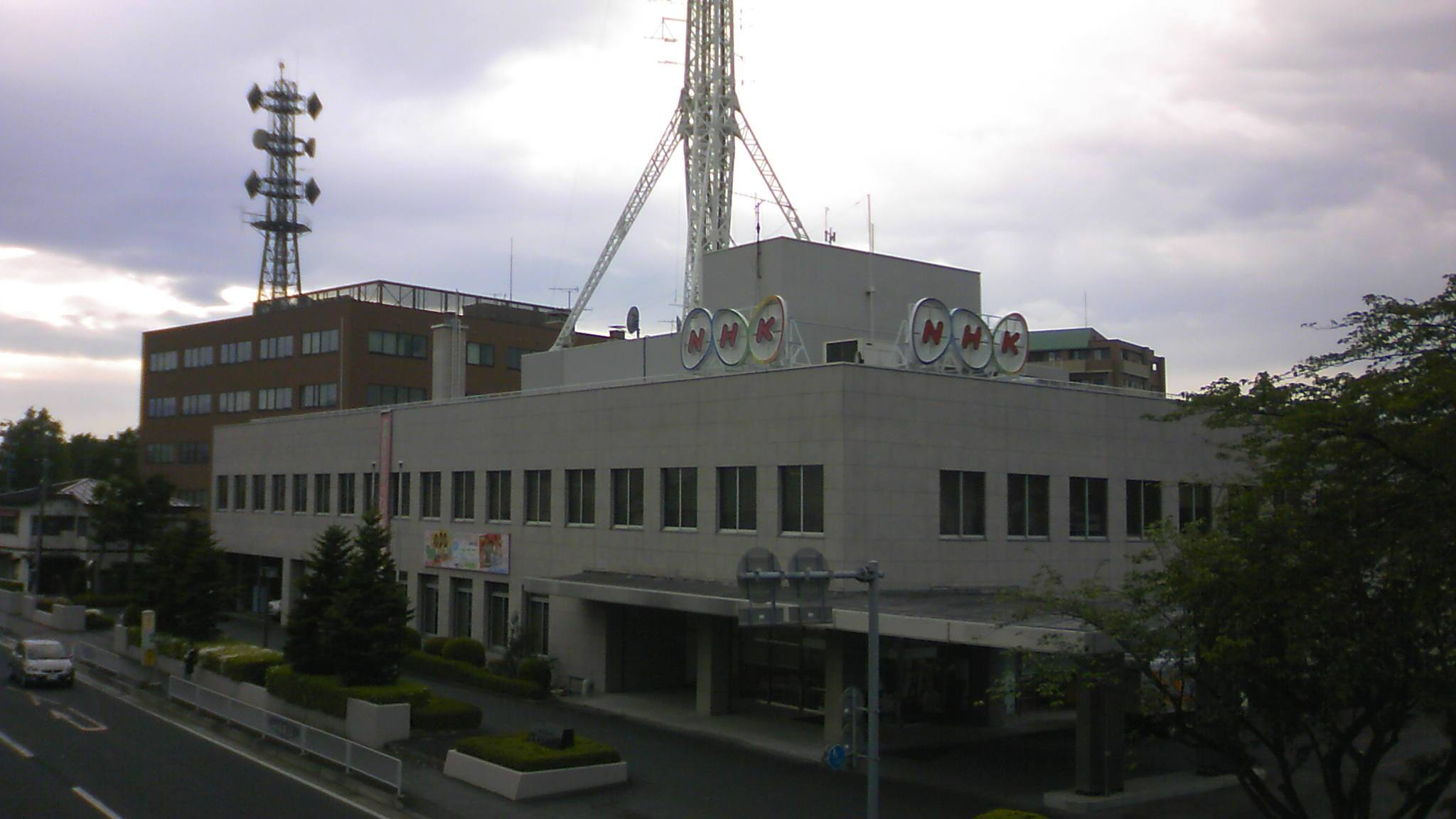
NHK Morioka Broadcasting Station

The NHK Morioka Broadcasting Station (NHK盛岡放送局, NHK Morioka Hōsō Kyoku) is a unit of the NHK that oversees terrestrial broadcasting in Iwate Prefecture. The station uses the JOQG and JOQC calls.

== History ==
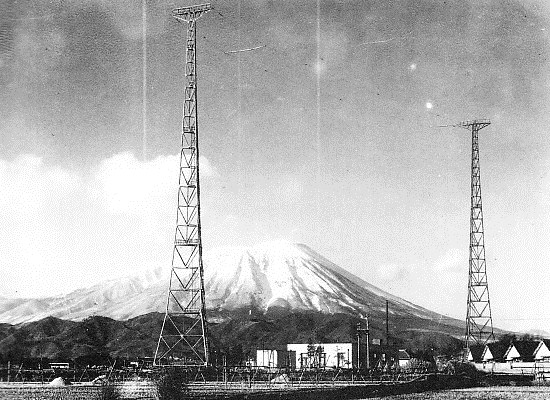
The station in 1938

JOQG started broadcasting on August 7, 1938. Television broadcasts followed in December 1958.

On June 1, 1964, JOQG-FM started test broadcasts, with stereo programming being relayed from Sendai. Color broadcasts started on JOQG-TV on September 24, 1964 and on JOQC-TV on March 20, 1966. In 1971, local news items began to be shot on color film.

In 1977, work to convert local operations to stereo started. Full-time stereo broadcasting on JOQG-FM began on March 31, 1980. Television stereo broadcasts began on JOQG-TV on August 8, 1986, while JOQC-TV followed on March 21, 1991. The analog signals were switched off on March 31, 2012. In 2011–2012, the station aired Testimony: Those Days, Those Times, about the effects of the 2011 Tōhoku earthquake and tsunami. These aired on Obanai Iwate. In addition, segments from Iwate were also seen on Sendai's Disaster News segment for the three affected prefectures.
