= NHK Iwaki Branch =

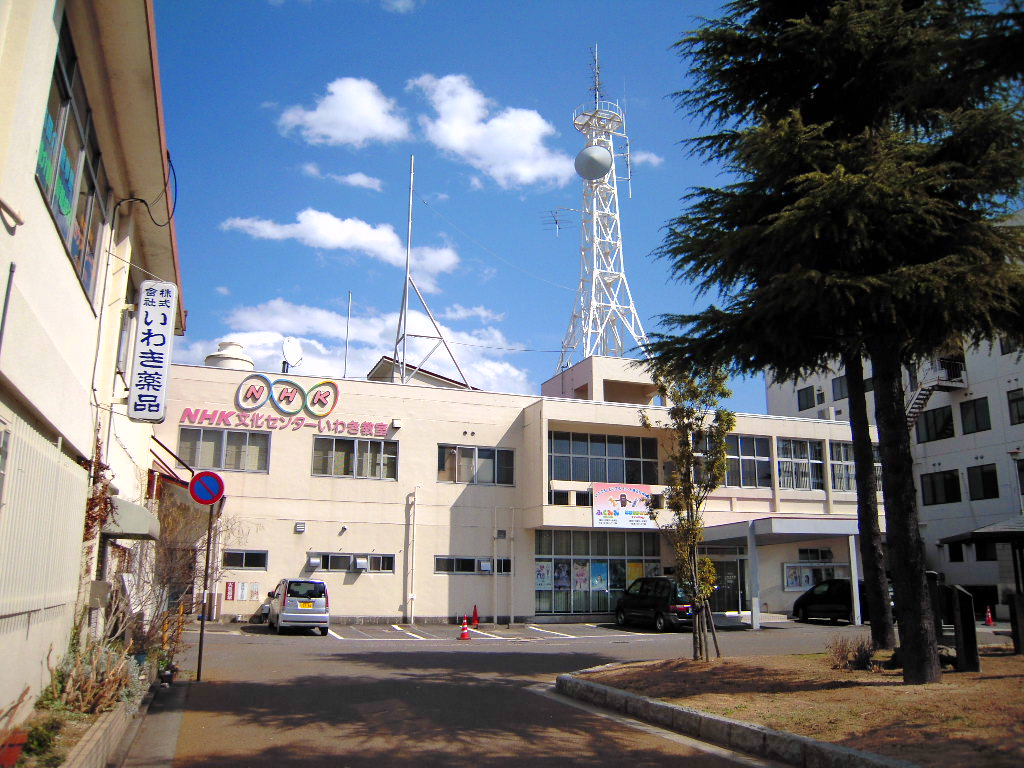
Building and transmitter in March 2010

The NHK Iwaki Branch (NHKいわき支局, NHK Iwaki Shikyoku) is a division of the NHK Fukushima Broadcasting Station which is in charge of news gathering operations in Iwaki.

== History ==
The Iwaki station started operating on December 30, 1941, as the Taira station. The Radio 1 station was JOHQ and broadcast on 1360kc while Radio 2 was JOHZ on 1540kc. As of 1955, its director was Aota Saburo. By 1962, the post was filled by Maruyama Isao.

In March 1959, television broadcasts started from Mount Sasamori, relaying the signal from Fukushima, followed in June 1960 by NHK Wakamatsu. When Taira merged with fourteen other municipalities in 1966, the station was renamed to Iwaki. In 1984, a monument to Yatsuhashi Kengyo was erected as its premises.

In 2016, the station was heavily downsized, by being integrated into the Fukushima station's sales branch as part of corporate rationing efforts. Some of its functions were now dependent only on Fukushima.
