= NHK Koriyama Branch =

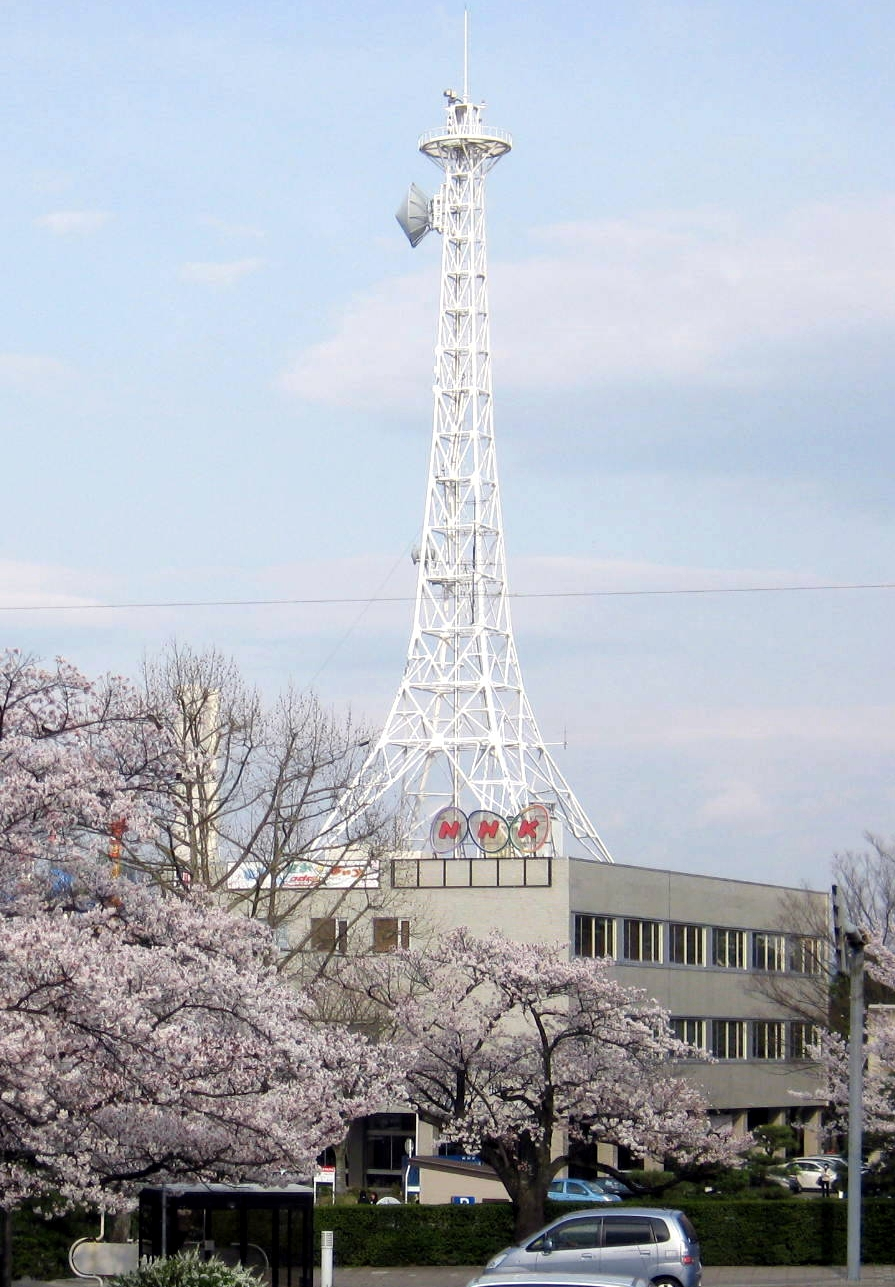
Building and transmitter in April 2010

The NHK Koriyama Branch (NHK郡山支局, NHK Koriyama Shikyoku) is a division of the NHK Fukushima Broadcasting Station which is in charge of news gathering operations in Kōriyama.

== History ==
The Koriyama station started operating on February 13, 1941 (call sign JOCP). The station had to vacate its offices in the late 1960s, as Fukushima Central Television had selected Koriyama as its operating base. Television broadcasts started simultaneously with JOFP-TV, as part of a plan to introduce television quickly in the prefecture. The introduction of television led to a sharp loss in the usage of radio sets.

In 2016, the station was heavily downsized, by being integrated into the Fukushima station's sales branch as part of corporate rationing efforts. Some of its functions were now dependent only on Fukushima.
