= NHK Yamaguchi Broadcasting Station =

The NHK Yamaguchi Broadcasting Station (NHK山口放送局, NHK Yamaguchi Hōsō Kyoku) is a unit of the NHK that oversees terrestrial broadcasting in Yamaguchi Prefecture.

== History ==
The station started broadcasting on April 19, 1941, as the NHK Hofu Broadcasting Station (日本放送協会防府放送局), under the callsign JOUG. Radio 2 (JOUC) started broadcasting on June 1, 1951, and NHK FM on April 1, 1964. Television broadcasts began on June 15, 1959.

On April 14, 1962, the station was renamed NHK Yamaguchi Broadcasting Station due to the relocation to the prefectural capital. NHK-E (JOUC-TV) started broadcasting on September 1, 1962.

On January 26, 1994, NHK Yamaguchi and Changwon KBS held a joint debate using satellite links. Both presented their respective regions to the opposite audience and talked about topics that would increase civil exchange between the two countries. By 2008, NHK Yamaguchi was doing a news exchange with its Korean sister station.

NHK+ added Yamaguchi programming on May 22, 2023.

== Programming ==
As of fiscal 2024:

- Yamaguchi Prefecture News (weekdays, 12:15-12:20pm)
- Information Revolution! Yamaguchi (weeknights, 6:10-7pm)
- Y-SPECIAL (YAMAGUCHI SPECIAL) (selected Fridays, 7:30-7:55pm; repeat the following Saturday 7:30-7:55am; Connect from Hiroshima is brooadcast on remaining Fridays)
- Information Revolution! Yamaguchi 845 (weeknights 8:45-9pm except holidays)
- Information Revolution! Yamaguchi 645 (weekends 6:45pm-7pm)
- News bulletins for NHK Radio 1 and NHK FM: 7:20-7:25am, 9:55-10am (Radio 1 only), 12:15-12:20pm, 1:55-2pm (Radio 1 only), 6:50-7pm
- YAMAGUTIC
