= NHK Tsuruoka Branch =

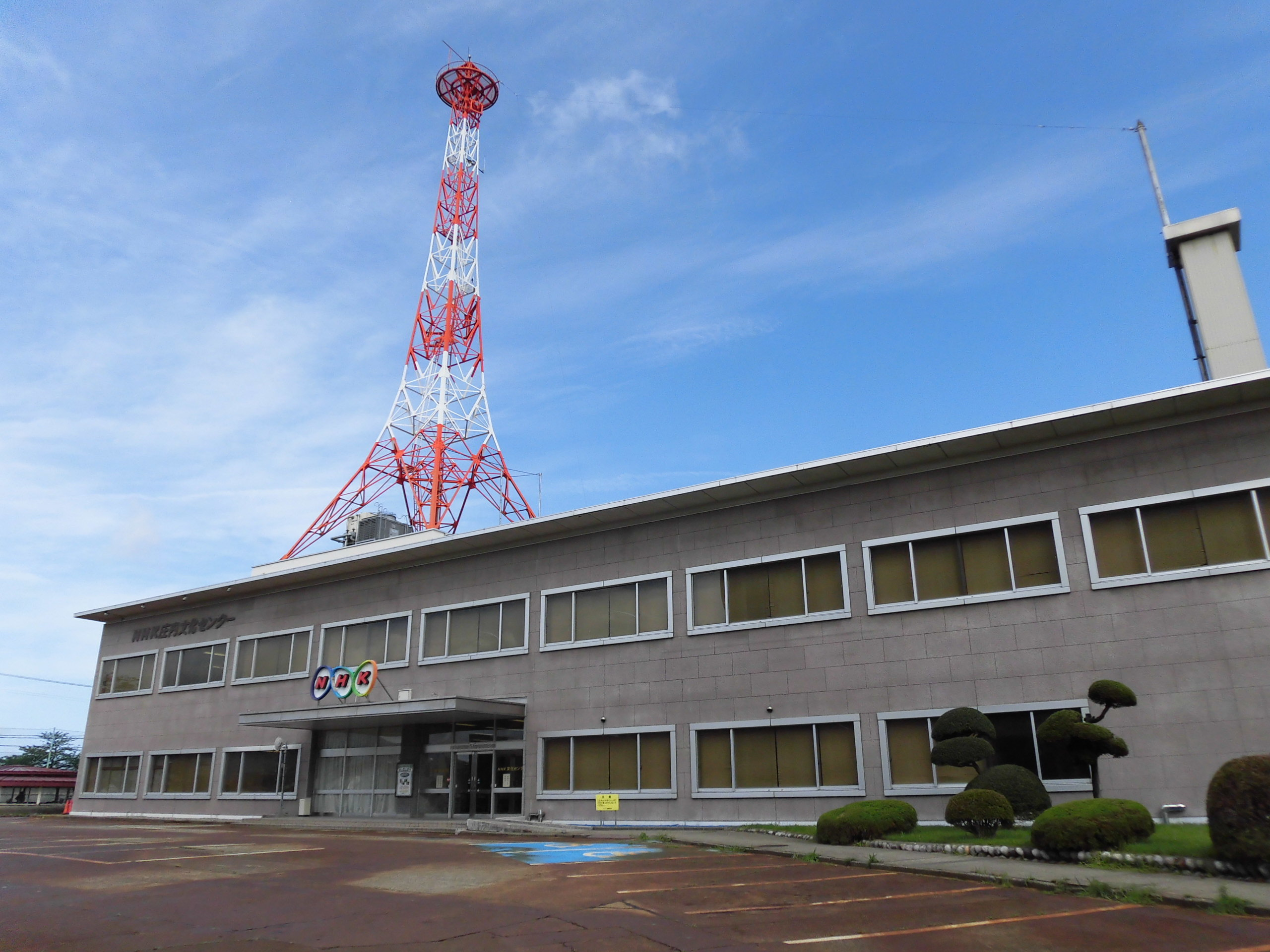
Former building

The NHK Tsuruoka Branch (NHK鶴岡支局, NHK Tsuruoka Shikyoku) is a division of the NHK Yamagata Broadcasting Station which is in charge of news gathering operations in Tsuruoka and the coastal area of Yamagata Prefecture.

== History ==
The station started as a provisional station on December 31, 1941, and began full-time broadcasts on April 21, 1946, under the call sign JOJP.

JOJP-TV (channel 3) started broadcasting in February 1960, followed by JOJD-TV (channel 6) in November 1962.

In 2017, the branch moved and the old building closed. The Shonai Cultural Center moved to Ginza Street, but eventually shut down in March 2021. A group of locals who went to its classes opposed the closure of the college and created a volunteer organization to continue work. In 2022, the land of the former headquarters was sold to Takara Leben Tohoku. An apartment complex was built, forming Leben Tsuruoka GRAN MARK TERRACE (five floors, 128 units), expected to finish by spring 2025.

The NHK Tsuruoka Children's Choir, the last remain of the time it was an independent station, continues to perform.
