= NHK Kitakyushu Broadcasting Station =

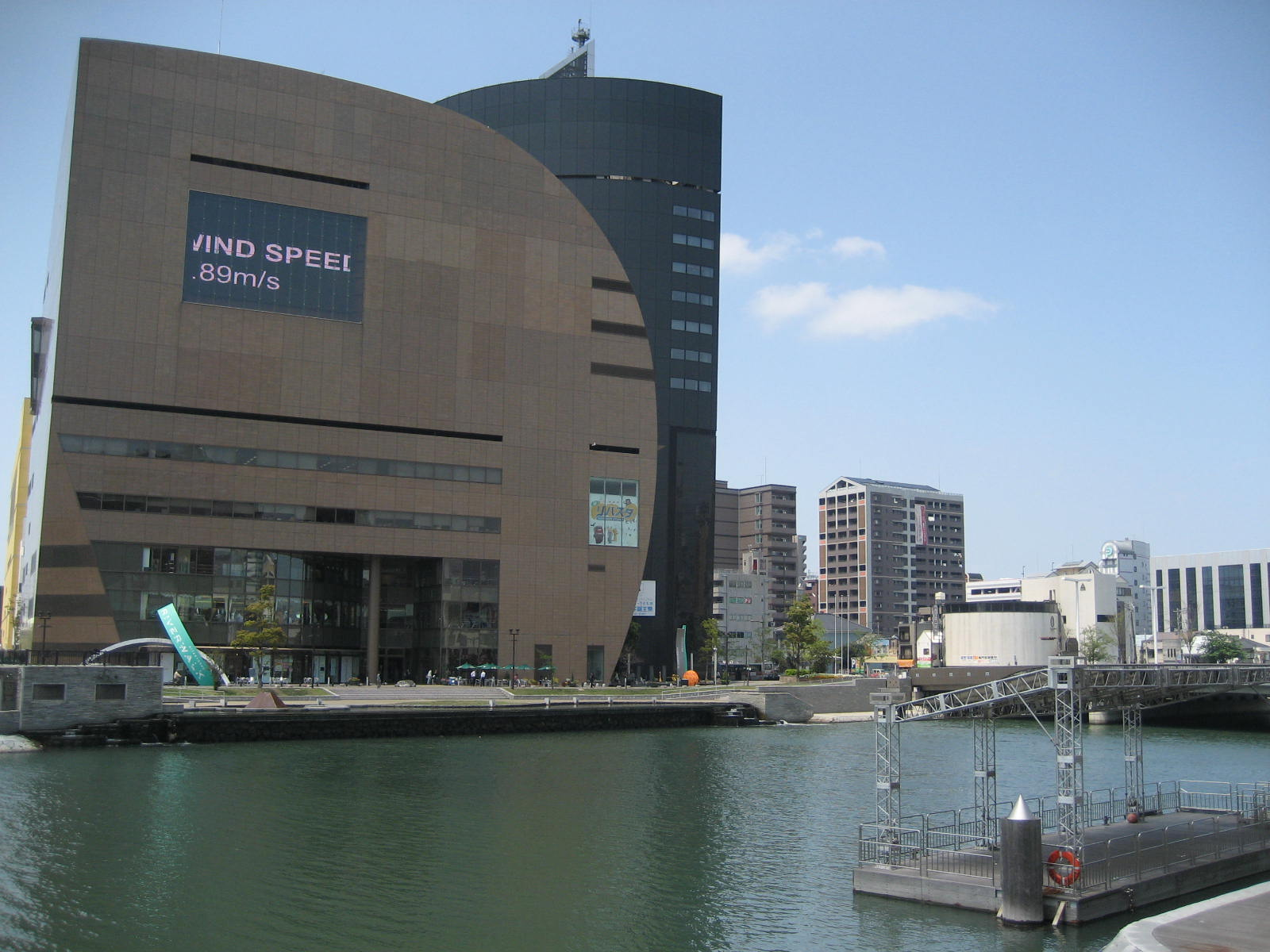
Head office

The NHK Kitakyushu Broadcasting Station (NHK北九州放送局, NHK Kitakyūshū Hōsō Kyoku) is a unit of the NHK that oversees terrestrial broadcasting for the Kitakyushu, Onga, Keichiku and Chikuho areas of Fukuoka Prefecture, representing a total of nine cities and nineteen villages. Unique among NHK's prefectural services outside of Hokkaido, Fukuoka has two units that produce local programming. Other prefectures across Japan had similar units, such as Sasebo in northern Nagasaki and Fukuyama in eastern Hiroshima, but these have since become mere branches without transmitting equipment and the capability of producing local programming.

== History ==
Radio station JOSK was the third to sign on in Kyushu (after Fukuoka in 1930 and Kumamoto in 1928), at the time when the city was still named Kokura. Broadcasts began on December 20, 1931. In March 1947, Radio 2 broadcasts began as JOSK2 (later JOSB starting in 1948).

Television broadcasts started on May 29, 1957, for JOSK-TV, JOSB-TV followed on January 8, 1962, becoming the first NHK Educational TV station in Kyushu. Following the merger of the cities led by Kokura to form Kitakyushu in 1963, the station's name changed accordingly, and moved from Hiaki to Daimon in 1966. Full-time color broadcasts did not commence until October 1971, after the Fukuoka station converted its local programming.

For the 90th anniversary of its establishment, the station chose the slogan "Nanshiyou?". On May 15, 2023, NHK+ added local programming for Kitakyushu.
