= NHK Fukuyama Branch =

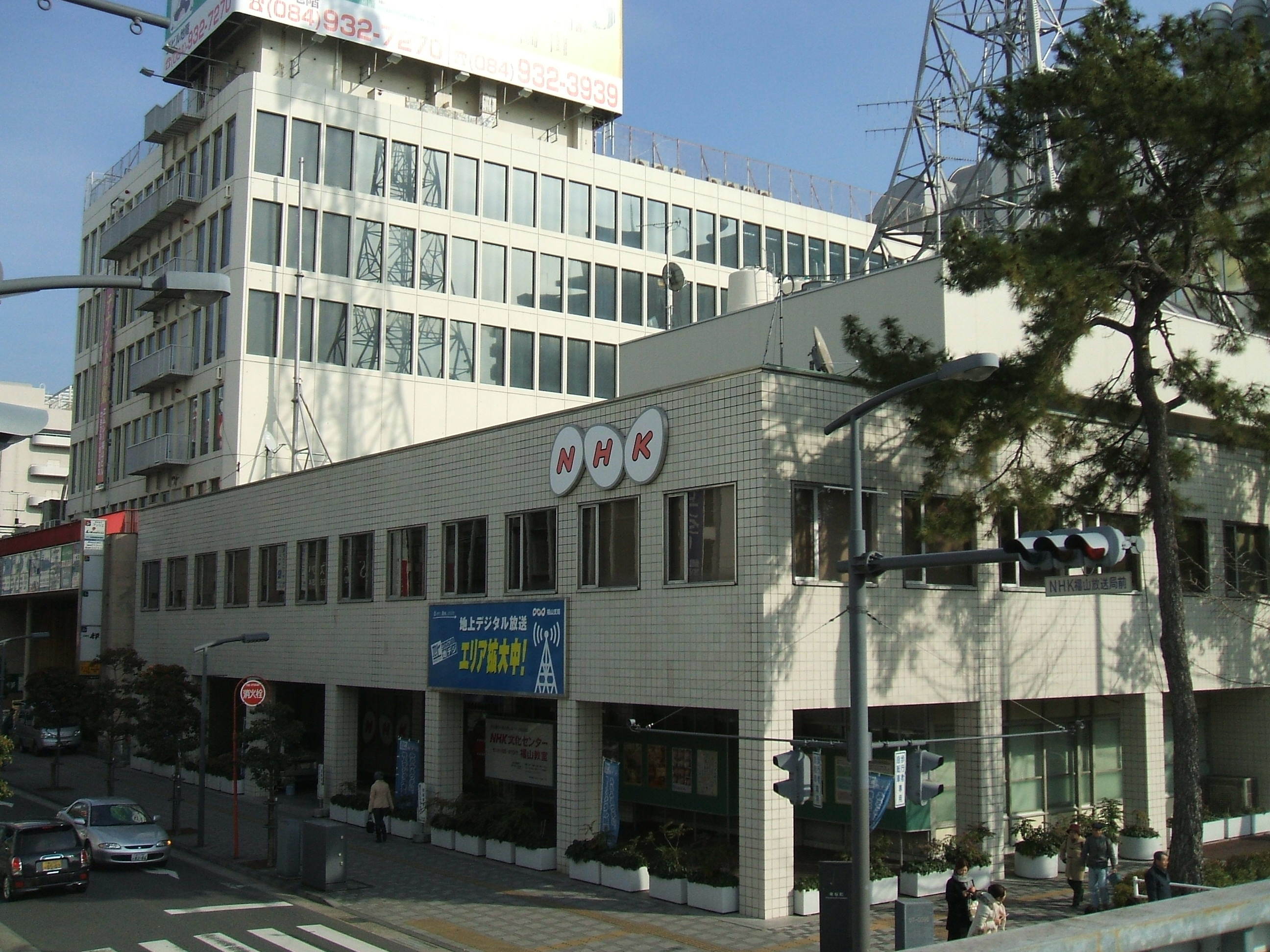
Former building

The NHK Fukuyama Branch (NHK福山支局, NHK Fukuyama Shikyoku) is a division of the NHK Hiroshima Broadcasting Station which is in charge of news gathering operations in Fukuyama and the eastern side of Hiroshima Prefecture, corresponding to the former Bingo Province. It used to operate a full radio and television service until 1988. Until 1967, it was based in Onomichi.

== History ==
The Onomichi station started operating on February 18, 1941 (call sign JODP). Station JODD followed on July 1, 1951.

Television broadcasts began on March 1, 1960 (JODP-TV). JODD-TV followed on December 1, 1962. NHK-G broadcast on channel 1 while NHK-E was on channel 7.

The station moved to Fukuyama in 1967. It lost its privileges in 1988, becoming a mere office of NHK Hiroshima. In 2015, it announced that it would vacate its premises in 2016 and move to the second floor of the Ines Fukuyama building, becoming a mere office. After that, it was only in charge of news gathering for the region. In September 2015, the Broadcasting Time Travel event, held in observance of NHK's 90th anniversary, was the last full-scale event held inside the full office before the downsize and relocation.
