= NHK Obihiro Broadcasting Station =

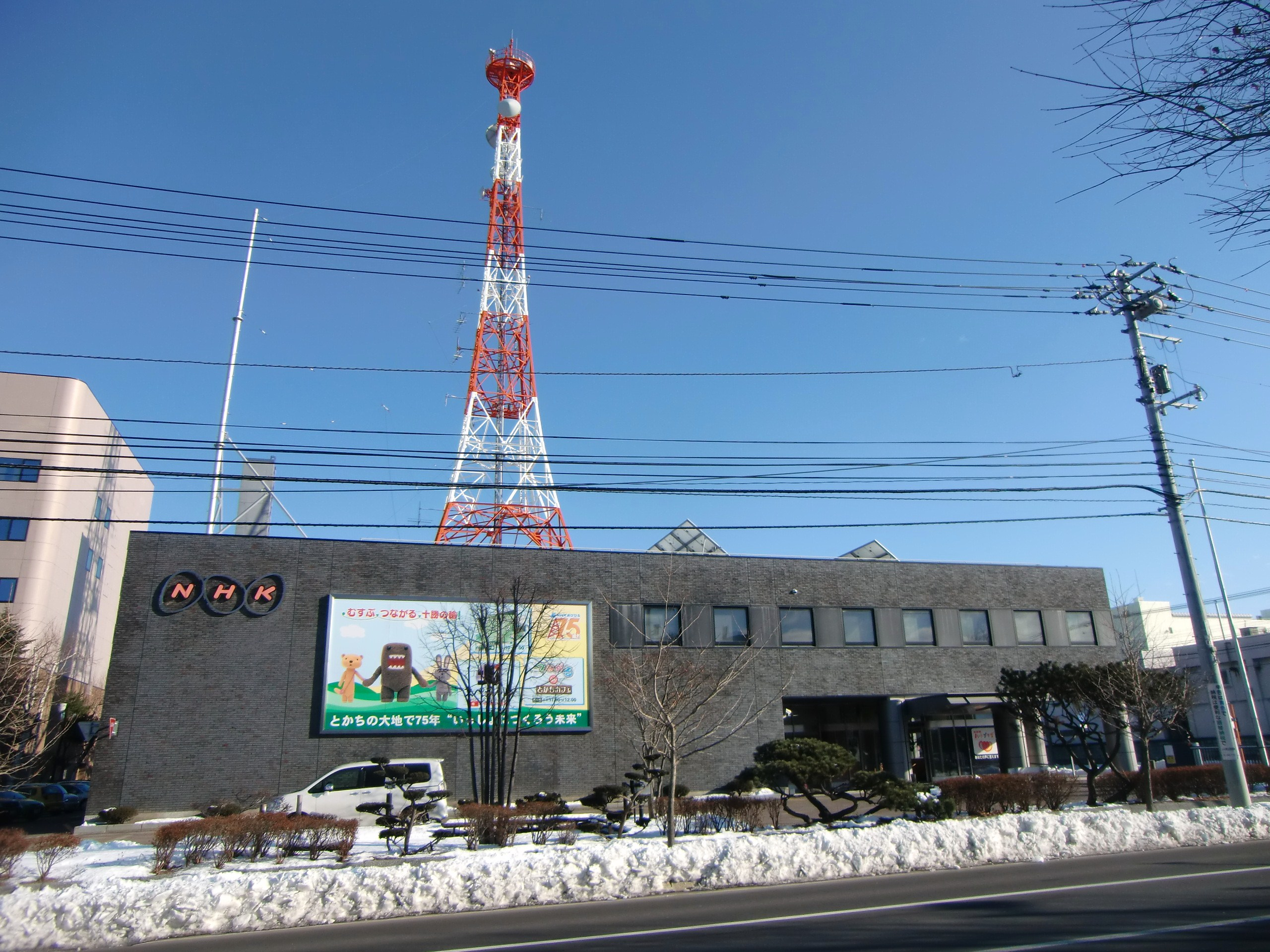
NHK Obihiro Broadcasting Station

The NHK Obihiro Broadcasting Station (NHK帯広放送局, NHK Obihiro Hōsō Kyoku) is a unit of the NHK that oversees terrestrial broadcasting in eastern Hokkaido Prefecture, based in Obihiro, Tokachi Subprefecture.

== History ==
Station JOOG started broadcasting on November 22, 1936. It operated on 950kc with an output of 500 watts. Television broadcasts began in December 1959 (JOOG-TV). In 2019, it produced the drama Eien no Nippon, which began airing on NHK G's Hokkaido stations on June 7 of that year, with plans to air it nationwide at a later date.

NHK reorganized its broadcasting units in Hokkaido from seven to four at the beginning of fiscal 2022. The Obihiro station absorbed most of the work done by the Kushiro station but strengthened the local programming in the seven stations of the prefecture. Obihiro and Kushiro together form the East Hokkaido unit of NHK's Hokkaido branch. However, from the beginning of fiscal 2023, it was decided that the regional units outside of Sapporo within the prefecture would be given to Sapporo, ultimately closing some of the departments in Kushiro.
