= NHK Aomori Broadcasting Station =

Unit of the Japan Broadcasting Corporation

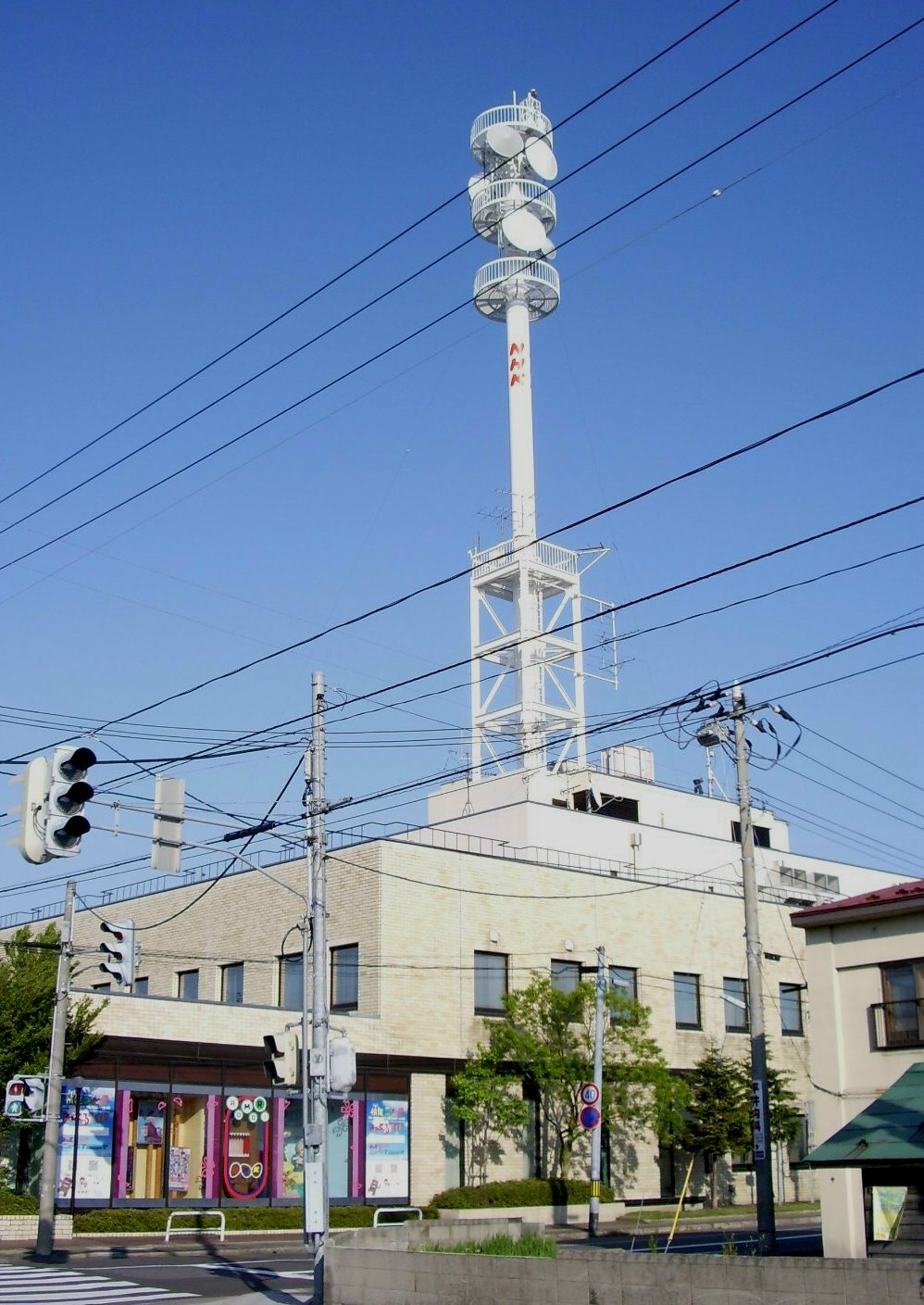
NHK Aomori Broadcasting Station

The NHK Aomori Broadcasting Station (NHK青森放送局, NHK Aomori Hōsō Kyoku) is a unit of the NHK that oversees terrestrial broadcasting in Aomori Prefecture. The Aomori station also operates branches in Misawa and Mutsu, while still having control over branches in Hirosaki and Hachinohe.

== History ==
The Aomori station started broadcasting on April 17, 1941 (callsign JOTG) and broadcast from Hanazono until 1962. Radio 2 (JOTC) followed on July 1, 1951.

On March 22, 1959, television broadcasts started (JOTG-TV) while broadcasts of the second network started on October 7, 1961.

On December 24, 1964, it started experimental FM broadcasts (JOTG-FMX) with stereo programs sent in from Sendai. Both TV channels started color broadcasts on March 20, 1966. In 1971, local news items began to be shot on color film.

In 1977, work to convert local operations to stereo started. Following changes to the AM frequency plan in 1978, JOTG moved to 963kHz and JOTC to 1521kHz. The introduction of PCM lines for FM broadcasting led to the end of the dependence on the Sendai station for stereo broadcasting in June 1981. This was in line with the move to the new facilities at Matsubara, which NHK Aomori still uses today. Television stereo broadcasts began on NHK General TV (JOTG-TV) on August 8, 1986, while JOTC-TV followed on March 21, 1991.

=== Hirosaki branch ===
The NHK Hirosaki Branch (NHK弘前支局, NHK Hirosaki Shikyoku) is the division of the NHK Aomori Broadcasting Station which is in charge of news gathering operations in the Hirosaki and Tsugaru regions. In its day, it was an independent local station, with its own programming.

Temporary test broadcasts from the station began on October 16, 1937, with a 35-watt unit in the second floor of the city's electricity building. Full broadcasts began on February 21, 1938 under the callsign JORG and a 50-watt output. At the time of launching, it became the fourth radio station overall to start broadcasting in the Tohoku region.

On June 22, 1988, the station was downsized to a branch. It still held special events after that, such as its 60th anniversary in 1998.
