= NHK Kumamoto Broadcasting Station =

JOGK and JOGB
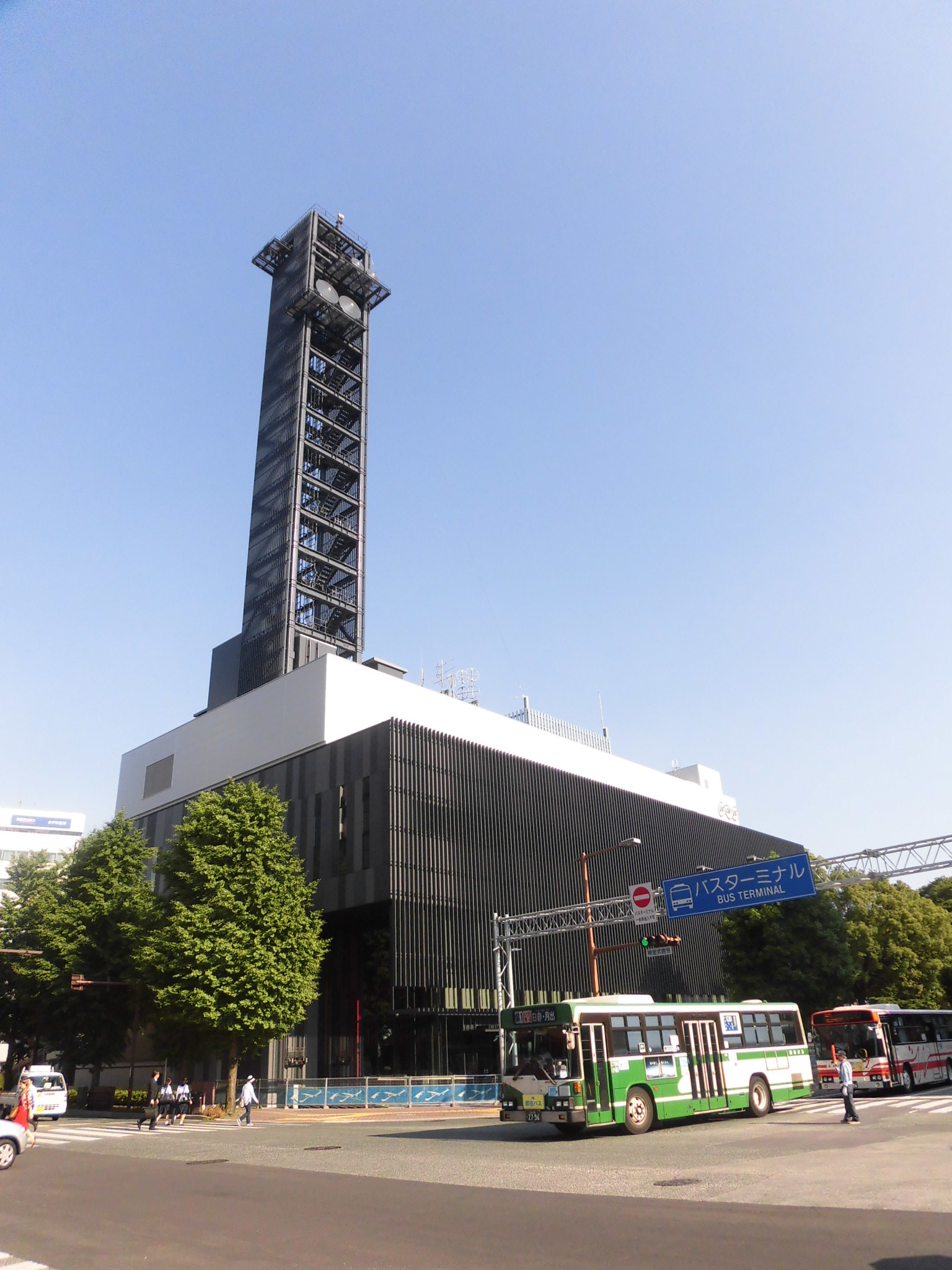

Kumamoto; Japan
- Broadcast area: Kumamoto Prefecture
- Frequencies: JOGK: 756 kHz (AM); JOGB: 873 kHz (AM)
- Branding: NHK Kumamoto Radio

Programming
- Language(s): Japanese
- Format: Public broadcasting
- Affiliations: NHK Radio 1; NHK Radio 2

Ownership
- Owner: NHK (Japan Broadcasting Corporation)

History
- First air date: JOGK: June 16, 1928 (Radio 1); JOGB: November 1945 (Radio 2)

Technical information
- Licensing authority: MIC
- Power: JOGK: 1 kW

Links
- Website: www.nhk.or.jp/kumamoto/

The NHK Kumamoto Broadcasting Station (NHK熊本放送局, NHK Kumamoto Hoso Kyoku) is a unit of the NHK that oversees terrestrial broadcasting in Kumamoto Prefecture. It uses the JOGK and JOGB call signs.

== History ==
Station JOGK started broadcasting on June 16, 1928. In the prewar period, it was the central station for Kyushu, a distinction it held even after the opening of the station in Fukuoka in 1930. Its slogan was "Antenna in the mountain, reflecting the city".Radio 2 (JOGB) began in September 1945.

On February 22, 1958, television broadcasts (JOGK-TV) began, followed five years later by NHK Educational TV (JOGB-TV). JOGK broadcast on channel 9 and JOGB on channel 2, both using a 1kW transmitter. On October 1, 1964, JOGK-TV started airing color programs followed by JOGB-TV on March 20, 1966. On July 1, 1971, the station was promoted to NHK's regional headquarters for Kyushu. By October, all programming was in color.

Stereo TV broadcasts began in June 1983. Organizational reforms at NHK stripped the Kumamoto station from its longtime management benefits as the main station in Kyushu, moving to Fukuoka in 1992 (broadcasting operations had moved in 1957).

On May 15, 2023, local programming joined NHK+.
