= NHK Tottori Broadcasting Station =

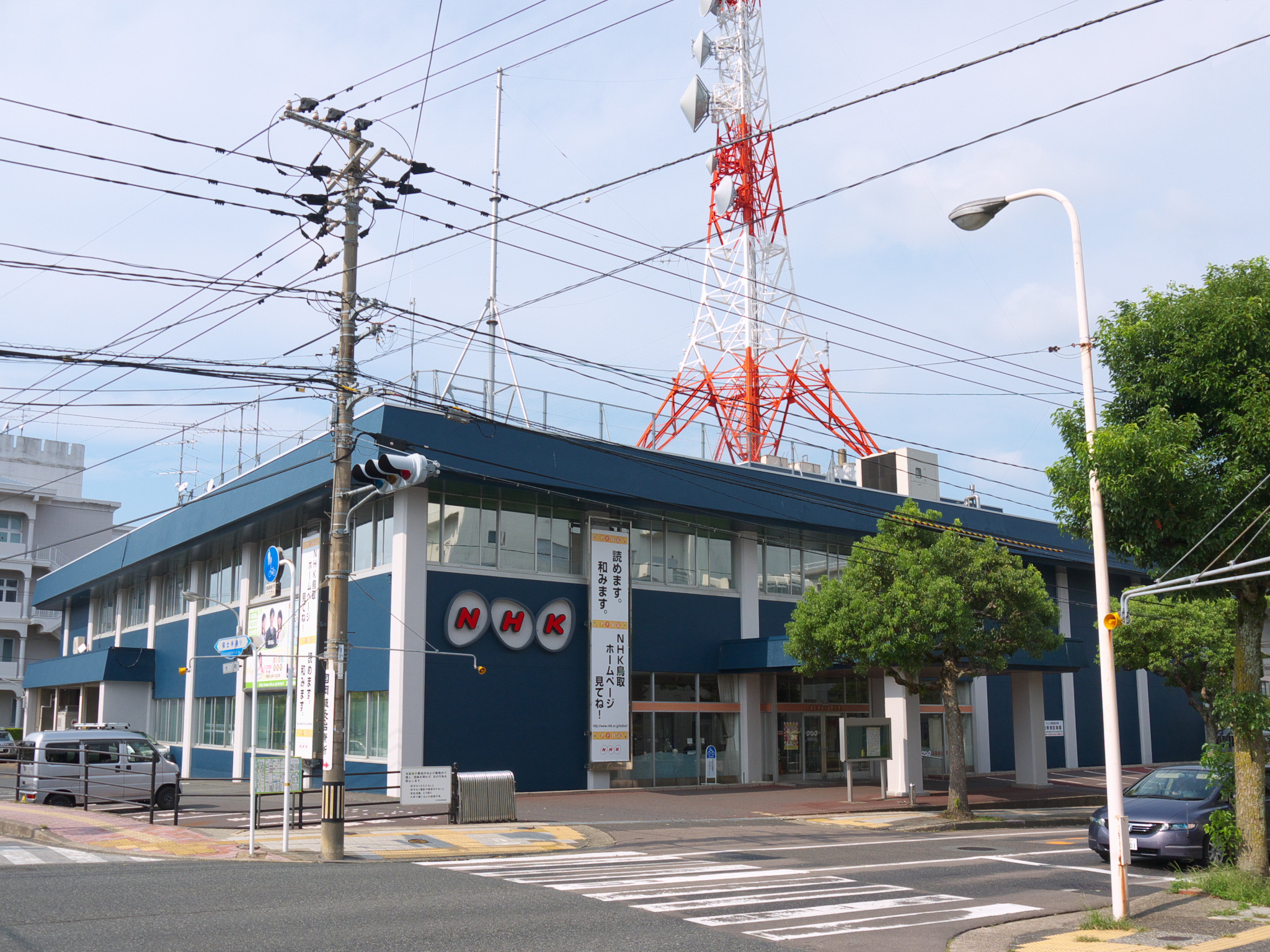
Former building

The NHK Tottori Broadcasting Station (NHK鳥取放送局, NHK Tottori Hoso Kyoku) is a unit of the NHK that oversees terrestrial broadcasting in Tottori Prefecture.

== History ==
Radio station JOLG signed on on December 16, 1936, JOLC followed in April 1950.

On March 3, 1959, JOLG-TV signed on, on the same day as Nihonkai Telecasting. A microwave line was set up in Okayama from Ningyo-toge, because NTT did not establish a microwave line to Tottori yet. JOLC-TV followed on December 28, 1962.

On December 24, 1964, NHK-FM (JOLG-FM) started test broadcasts. Color TV started on both JOLG-TV and JOLC-TV on March 20, 1966; local news was converted to color in early October 1971. Work to convert the FM station to stereo began in 1977.

In 1985, JOLG-FM ended dependence on Matsue for stereo broadcasts, completing what had started eight years earlier. JOLG-TV started stereo broadcasts on August 8, 1986, JOLG-TV followed on March 21, 1991.

NHK+ added Matsue programming on May 22, 2023.

== Programming ==
As of fiscal 2025:

- News bulletin on weekdays (12:15-12:20pm)
- Iro★Dori (weekdays 6:15-7pm)
- News Tottori 845 (weeknights 8:45-7pm, replaced by regional news service on holidays at 8:55pm from Hiroshima)
- San'in Special (irregular Fridays 7:30-7:55pm, repeated the following Saturday at 7:30-7:55am or 10:55-11:20am, also shown on delay in Hiroshima)
- San'in NEWS 645 (6:45-7pm, shared with Matsue, Tottori produces the Saturday edition and Matsue the Sunday edition)
- Connect (regional program from Hiroshima, occasionally produced in Tottori)
- News bulletins on NHK Radio 1: 12:15-12:20pm, 1:55-2pm and 6:50-7pm (this last one simulcast with NHK FM)
