= NHK Sapporo Broadcasting Station =

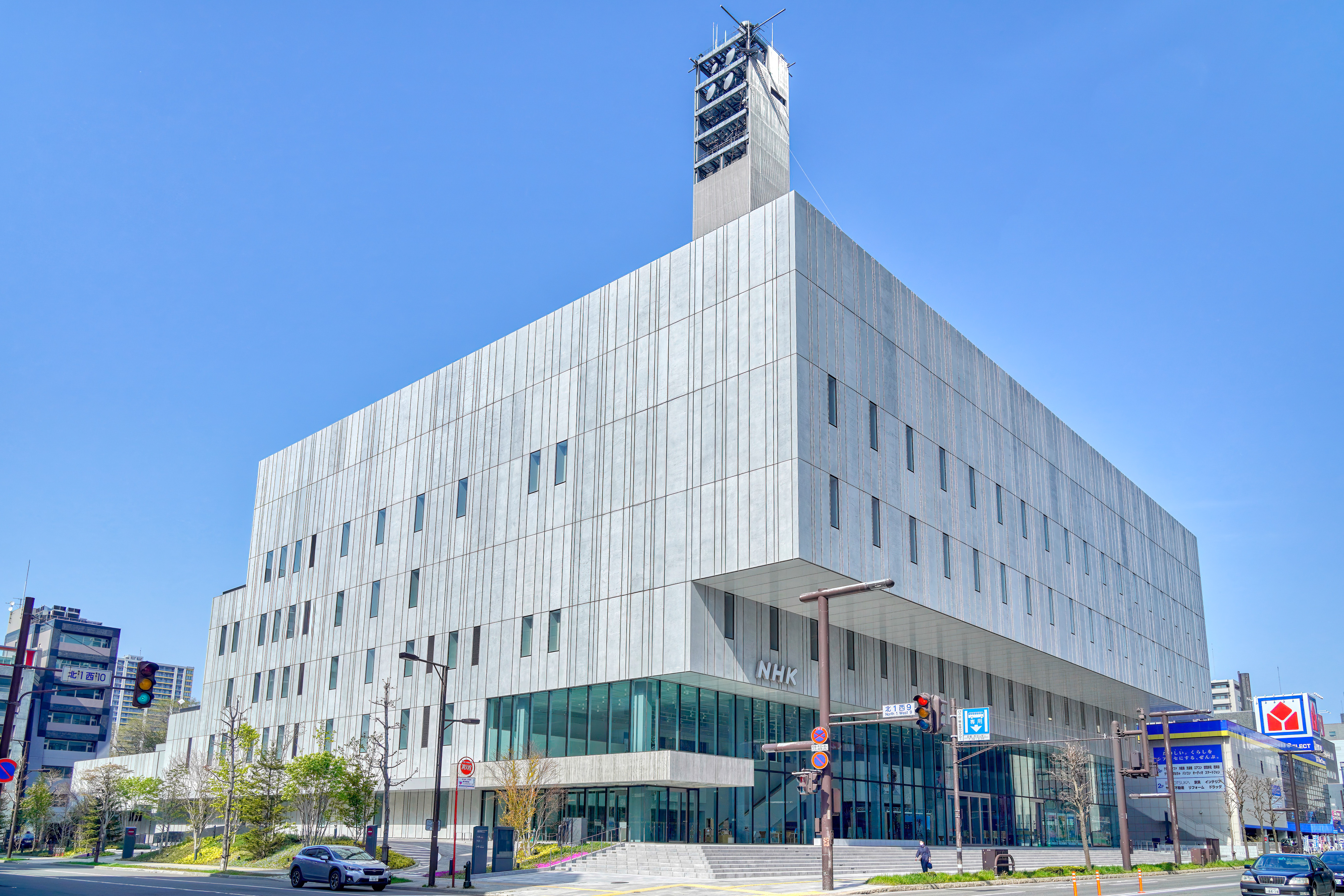
Former NHK Sapporo Broadcasting Station/New Building

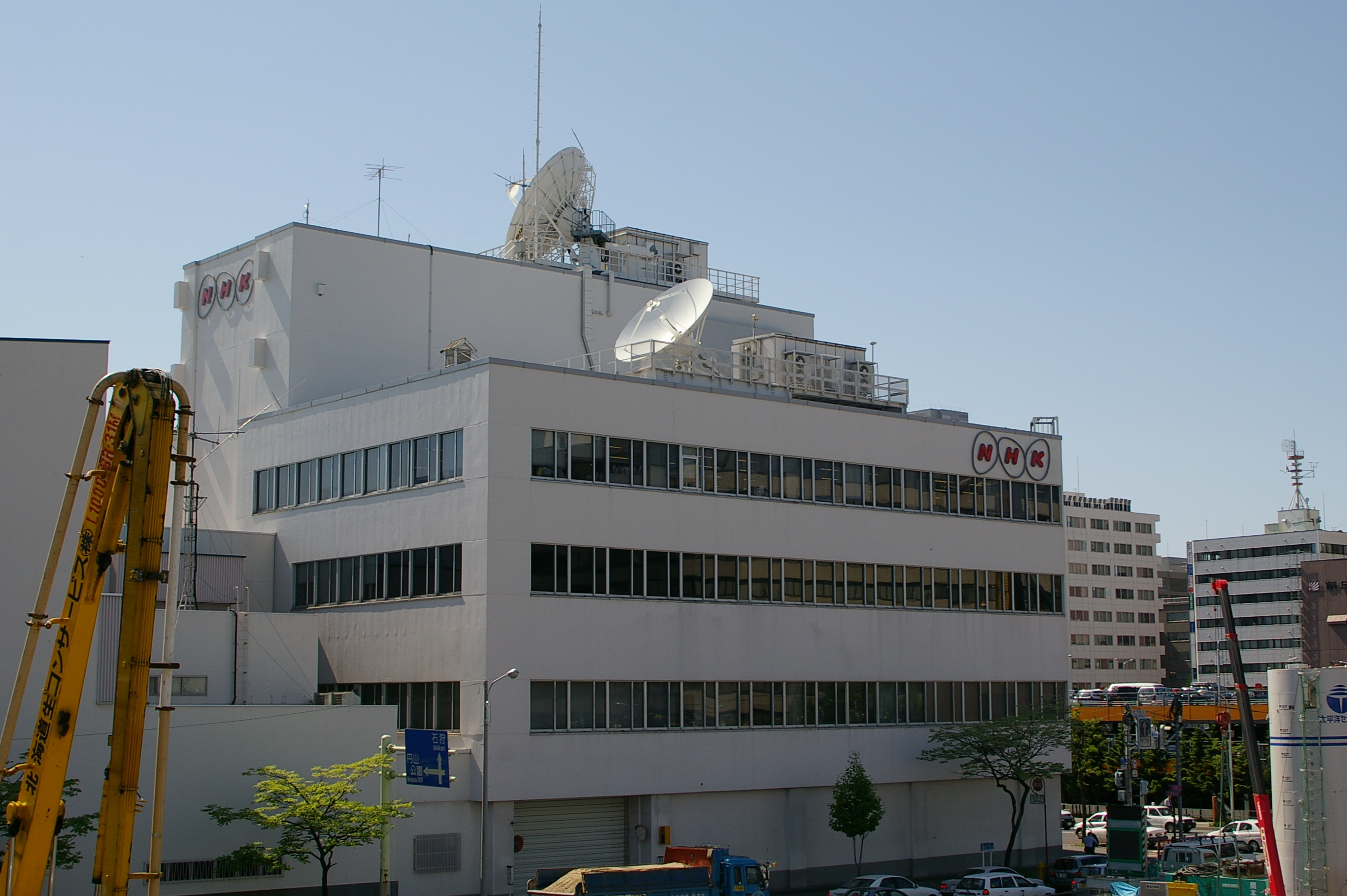
Former NHK Sapporo Broadcasting Station/New Building

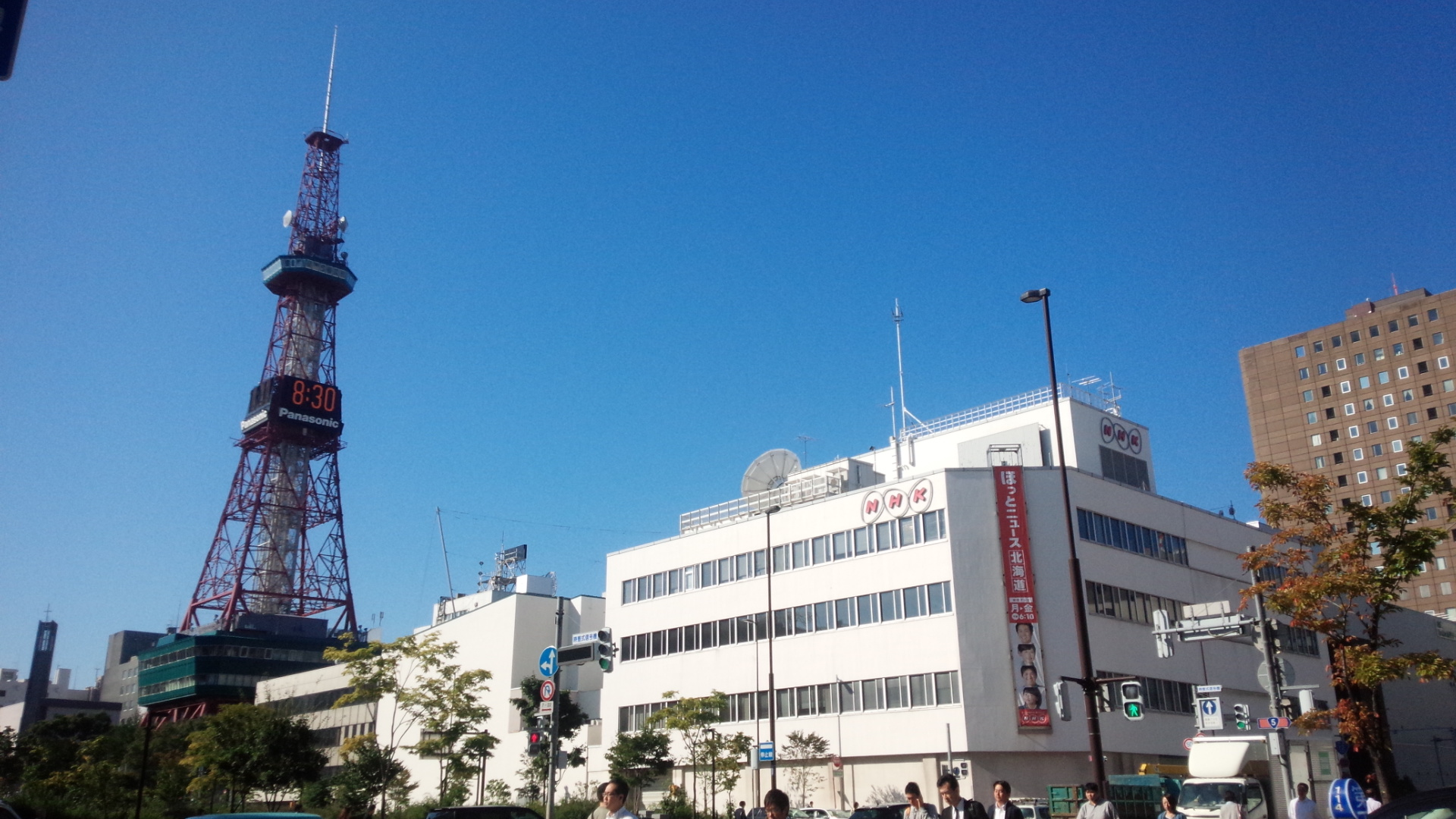
Former NHK Sapporo Broadcasting Station (front)

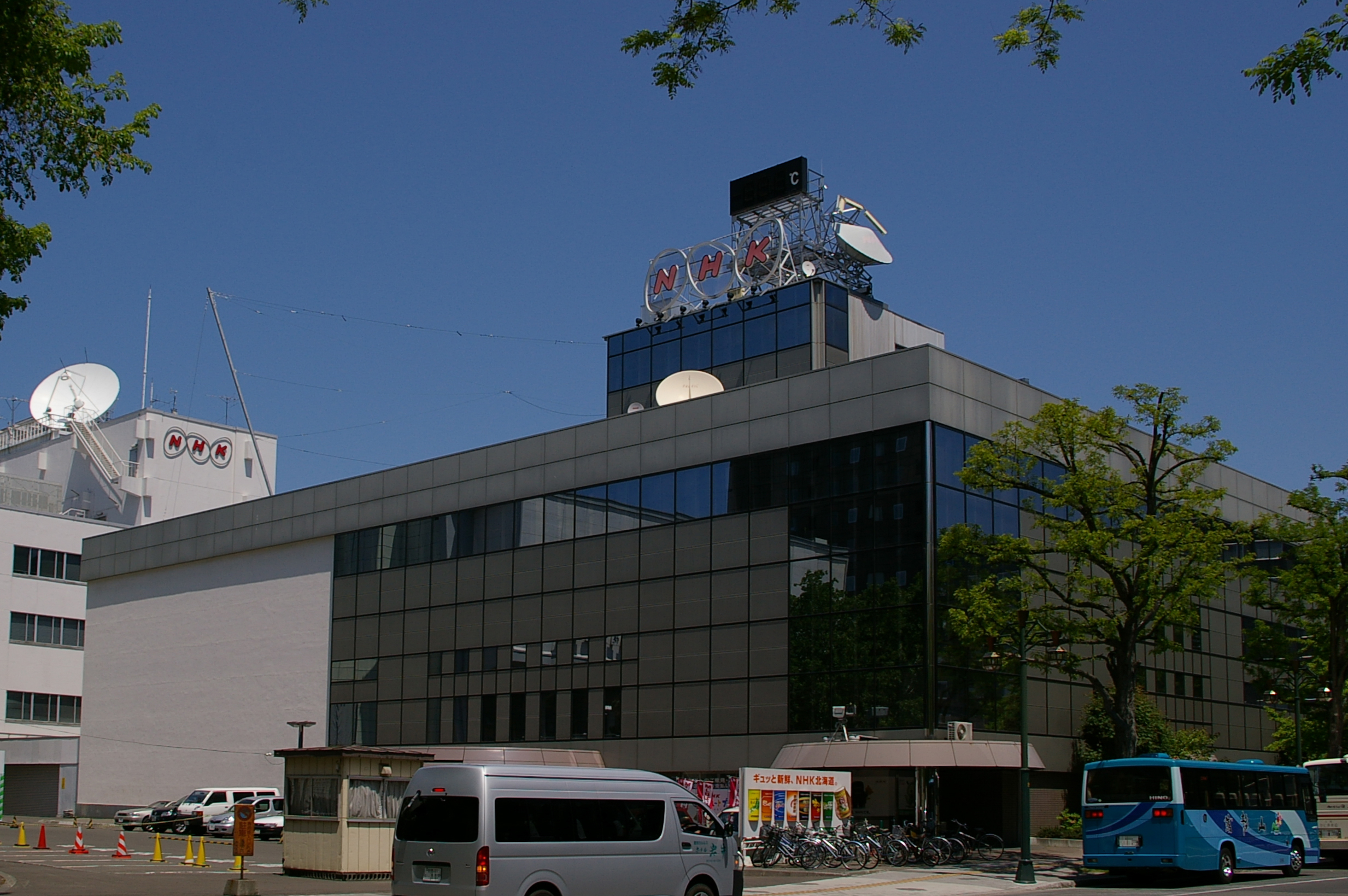
Former NHK Sapporo Broadcasting Station/Old main building (Chuo-ku, Sapporo)

The NHK Sapporo Broadcasting Station (NHK札幌放送局, NHK Sapporo Hōsō Kyoku) is a unit of the NHK that oversees terrestrial broadcasting in the area around Sapporo, the capital of Hokkaido Prefecture. It is one of eight core regional stations operated by the NHK and the seat of one of the seven regional stations in its jurisdiction. It is located in Chuo Ward, Sapporo City, Hokkaido.

== History ==
The NHK established a branch in Sapporo on June 20, 1927. The radio station (callsign JOIK, 10 kW, current NHK Radio 1 Sapporo) started on June 5, 1928. After a reform in 1934, it was promoted to the status of Sapporo Central Broadcasting Station. Branches opened in Otaru and Toyohara (currently Yuzhno-Sakhalinsk under Russian jurisdiction) in 1941.

NHK Radio 2 (JOIB) started on September 3, 1945, while also providing facilities for an AFRS station (WLKD) later that month.

Television broadcasts (JOIK-TV) started on December 22, 1956, from the Sapporo TV Tower on VHF channel 3, this was the first television station in Hokkaido. The transmitter tower was relocated to Teineyama on May 27, 1962. NHK Educational broadcasts (JOIB-TV) from the same transmitter started on June 1, 1962.

Color broadcasts started on NHK General between 1964 and 1965 and on NHK Educational in 1966. Production of color programs began in February 1967.

The central broadcasting system promoted in 1934 was changed to a regional headquarters system in 1971, and the name was changed to the Hokkaido headquarters of the NHK. In a 1980 reform, the name was changed to Sapporo Broadcasting Station in charge of the Hokkaido Jurisdiction before changing to the current Sapporo Broadcasting Station after the 1984 reforms.

On July 22, 1988, both Otaru and Iwamizawa broadcasting stations were downgraded to the newsroom of the Sapporo Broadcasting Station. At the same time, the Kitasorachi area was transferred to the Asahikawa Broadcasting Station.

Digital terrestrial broadcasts started on June 1, 2006, and analog terrestrial broadcasts ended on July 24, 2011.

On March 3, 2021, regional programming (in an initial phase from the core stations) was added to NHK+. On June 1, 2021, the NHK Sapporo Broadcasting Station moved to the new Broadcasting Center. It officially opened on November 27, 2021.

=== Relocation to the New Broadcasting Hall (2012–2021) ===
NHK was looking for a new location for its aging Sapporo Broadcasting Hall, which was built over 50 years ago, and initially considered moving to the adjacent Sapporo Sosei Square, but in March 2012, a redevelopment plan was announced. After that, on September 25, 2012, Hokkaido Television Broadcasting announced the relocation of its headquarters, which was moved on September 18, 2018. In November 2013, NHK and the City of Sapporo agreed to equate the current site for the Broadcast Hall owned by NHK agreed to exchange with the former site of the Sapporo City Hospital (Kita 1-jo Nishi 9-chome, Chuo-ku, Sapporo).

Afterwards, NHK suggested "a hall that can respond to any situation and provide safety and security to the people of Hokkaido," "a hall that has functions suitable for NHK Hokkaido's key station," "a hall that can flexibly respond to future new services and changes in business," and "a hall that can respond flexibly to future new services and changes in business operations". A development plan was being considered based on six concepts: a hall that contributes to the development of local culture and connects with the people of Hokkaido, a hall that is friendly to people and the environment and takes advantage of Hokkaido's unique character, and a new sales call center. The plan was finalized in May 2015, and was discussed by NHK's board of directors and Management Committee within the same month, and the new broadcasting hall development plan was officially put into motion.

== Branches ==
Due to organizational reforms carried out across NHK in 2015, news offices and communications departments across the country were abolished and integrated into "bureaus". At the same time, the sales department, which had been strongly promoting the outsourcing of operations, were reorganized, with the sales departments of each broadcast station in Hokkaido being completely abolished and consolidated into the Sapporo station sales promotion department. The company was reorganized into a four-sales center structure.

Starting in the spring of 2022, the plan is to reorganize the local broadcast areas that each of the seven stations in Hokkaido is responsible for, and to proceed with a major review of the operations and structure of the related stations. Sapporo Broadcasting Station will integrate with Muroran Broadcasting Station to expand its broadcast hours, maintain a seven-station system, and aim to strengthen regional services. Additionally, the organization was reorganized as of April 1, 2023, reorganizing into a two-center system of "Business Management Center" and "Media Center," and at the same time, sales center functions outside central Hokkaido were transferred to Hakodate, Asahikawa, and Obihiro offices.

=== Branch offices ===
- Iwamizawa (formerly Iwamizawa Broadcasting Station)
- Otaru (formerly Otaru Broadcasting Station)
- Chitose
- Takigawa

=== Sales centers ===
- Hokkaido Chuo (former Shin-Sapporo Center was integrated and relocated to the main body. Also in charge of Muroran Bureau jurisdiction)
- Hokkaido South (located within Hakodate Bureau)
- Hokkaido North (located within the Asahikawa Bureau. Also in charge of the Kitami Bureau)
- Hokkaido East (located within Obihiro Bureau. Also in charge of Kushiro Bureau)
