= NHK Hiroshima Broadcasting Station =

The NHK Hiroshima Broadcasting Station (NHK広島放送局, NHK Hiroshima Hōsō Kyoku) is a unit of the NHK that oversees terrestrial broadcasting in Hiroshima Prefecture. It is the head NHK station for the Chugoku region.

== History ==
The station was created on July 6, 1928, using the call sign JOFK and was promoted to a Central Radio Station on May 16, 1934.

It was heavily damaged due to the atomic bombs on August 6, 1945. The building was destroyed and 36 of its staff were killed by the blast. A member of the NHK Osaka Broadcasting Station was attempting to receive further details; fifteen minutes after the blast, the station was uncontactable. Surviving staff members gathered at a nearby station in Hara (now Gion) and resumed broadcasting the following day from an extra room available there. Broadcasts were reinstated on a definitive basis on August 29. NHK Radio 2 (JOFB) started broadcasting on September 10, 1945.

NHK General Television broadcasts (JOFK-TV) started on March 21, 1956, and Educational Television broadcasts (JOFB-TV) on January 8, 1961. FM test broadcasts (JOFK-FM) were conducted on September 17, 1962, becoming regular two years later. On October 1, 1964, NHK General's Hiroshima station started color broadcasts and NHK Educational followed on March 20, 1966. Analog TV broadcasts finished on July 24, 2011.

=== Status of the NHK Hiroshima building at the time of the atomic bomb and aftermath ===
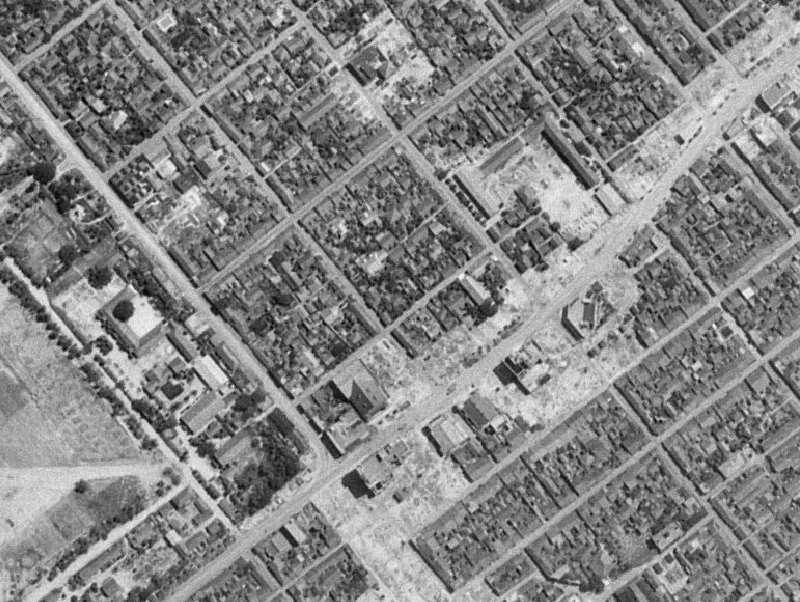
Photographs taken by the U.S. military of the Hatchobori area before and after the atomic bombing. Crossing the road is Aioi Dori and the building at the top center of the photo is the Central Broadcasting Station. Below that is Noboricho National School.

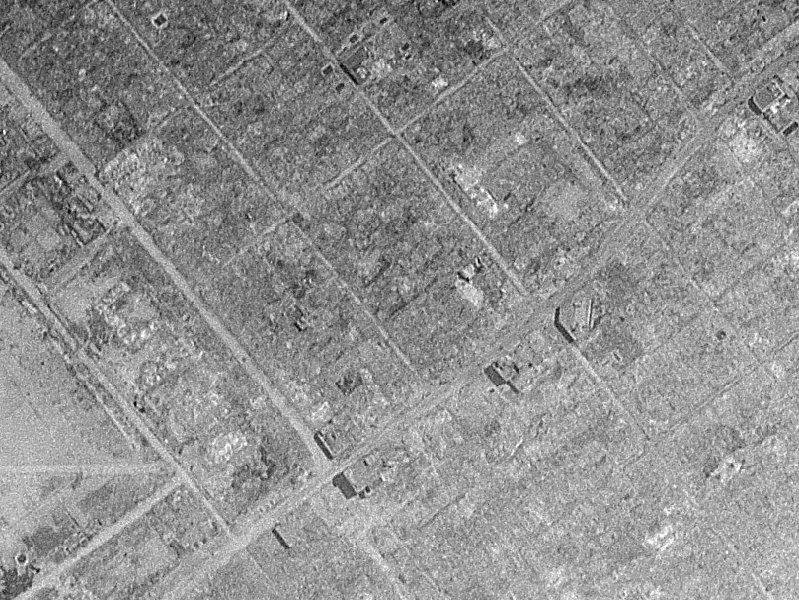
After the atomic bombing. It can be seen that the shape of the building remains.

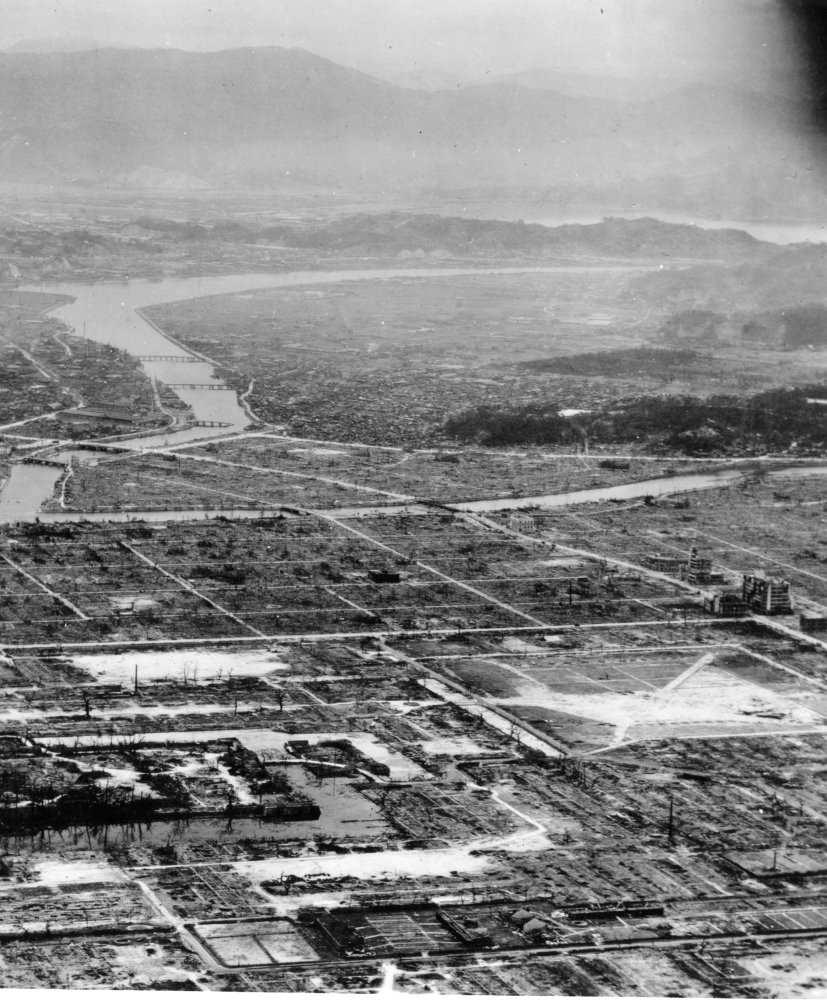
Looking west from near Teramachi. The building near the center of the photo is the Central Broadcasting Station.

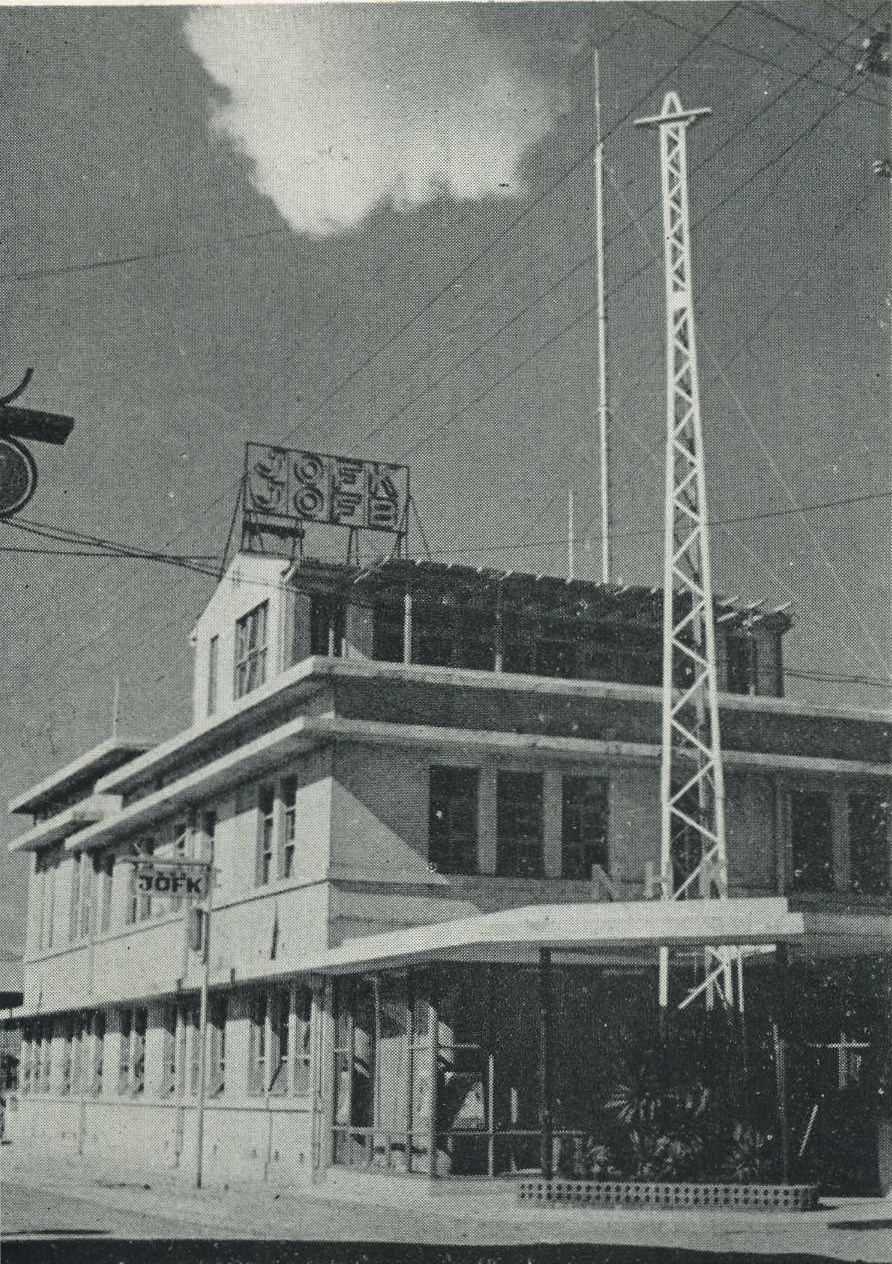
Hiroshima Central Broadcasting Station around 1955. This photo shows the former Kamigamikawa Concert Hall, which was damaged by the atomic bombing, and was renovated in 1946, when broadcasting resumed. It was used until 1960 when it was moved to Otemachi. It was later used as the Noboricho Annex, and was demolished in 1997.
