= Yoshimasa Hosoya =

Japanese voice actor and narrator (born 1982)

- 細谷 佳正
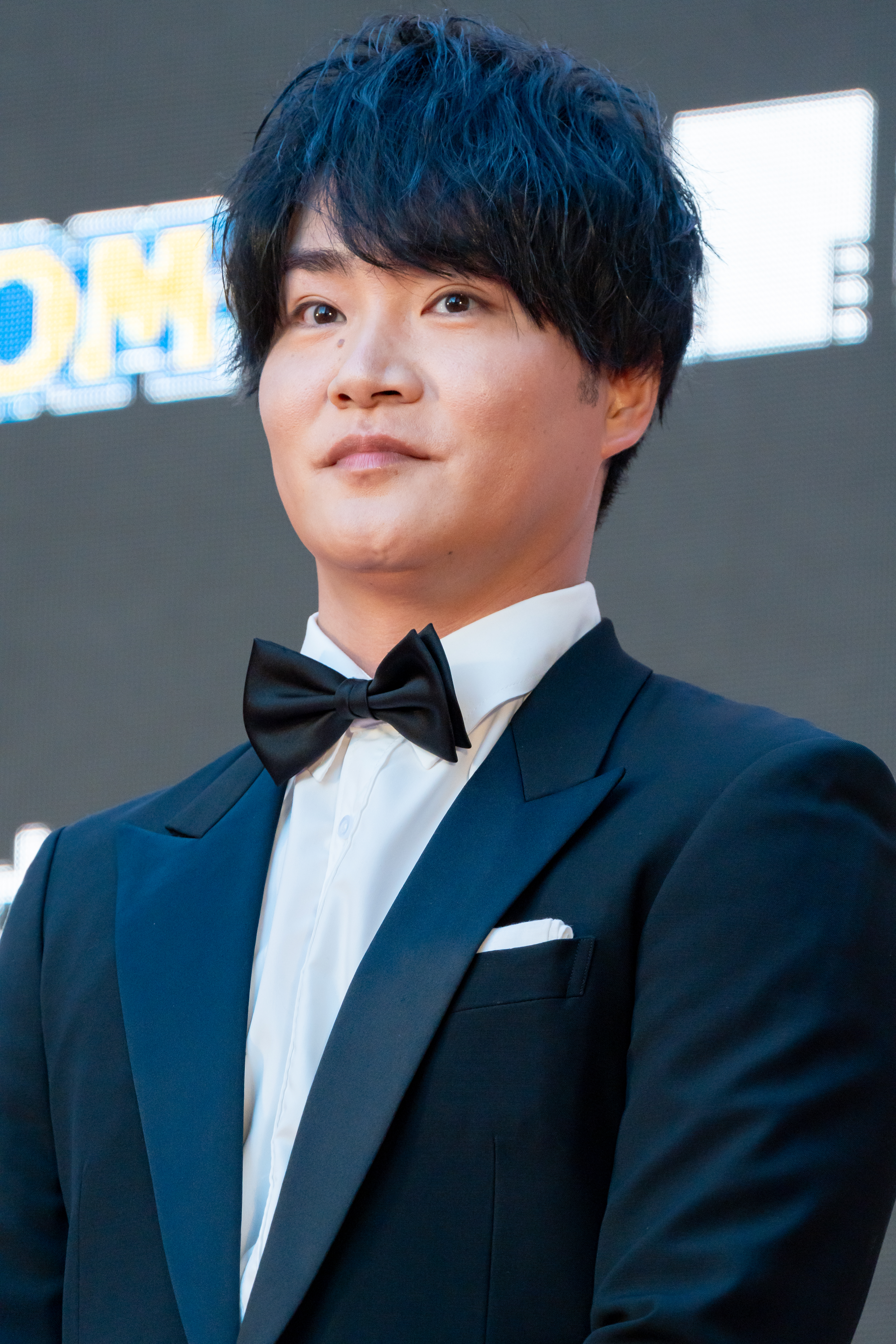
- Hosoya in October 2023
- Born: February 10, 1982 (age 44); Onomichi, Hiroshima, Japan
- Occupations: Voice actor; narrator
- Years active: 2004–present
- Agents: Mausu Promotion (2006–2014); Freelance (2014–present)
- Height: 176 cm (5 ft 9 in)
- Spouse: Undisclosed (m. 2025)
- Website: yoshimasa-hosoya.info

Yoshimasa Hosoya (細谷 佳正, Hosoya Yoshimasa; born February 10, 1982) is a Japanese voice actor and narrator.

== Career ==
After attending Tokyo Announce Gakuin Performing Arts College and Mausu Promotion Actor Training Center, he joined Mausu Promotion. He is currently a freelancer.

Among his many roles, he voiced Asahi Azumane in Haikyu!!, Shichika Yasuri in Katanagatari, Kuranosuke Shiraishi in The Prince of Tennis, Reiner Braun in Attack on Titan, Kojou Akatsuki in Strike the Blood, IV in Yu-Gi-Oh! Zexal, Saburō Katō in Star Blazers: Space Battleship Yamato 2199, Junpei Hyūga in Kuroko's Basketball, Sentarō Kawabuchi in Kids on the Slope, Haruhiro in Grimgar of Fantasy and Ash, Daryun in The Heroic Legend of Arslan, Orga Itsuka in Mobile Suit Gundam: Iron-Blooded Orphans, Akari Hizamaru in Terra Formars, Doppo Kunikida in Bungo Stray Dogs, Asahi Azumane in Haikyu!!, Fumikage Tokoyami in My Hero Academia, Nagare Akiba in Ushio and Tora, John H. Watson in The Empire of Corpses, Aren Kuboyasu in The Disastrous Life of Saiki K., Genjirō Tanigaki in Golden Kamuy, Joe in Megalobox, Houjou Shūsaku in In This Corner of the World, Ausukai Jin in Boogiepop and Others, Kanata Hoshijima in Astra Lost in Space, Shin in Dorohedoro, Belial in Granblue Fantasy, Welt Yang in Honkai Impact 3rd and Honkai: Star Rail, and Watanabe in Punishing: Gray Raven.

Hosoya won awards at the 8th Seiyu Awards and 10th Seiyu Awards for best supporting actor. On April 23, 2017, he underwent treatment for his throat. He resumed his career on August 4, 2017.

== Personal life ==
On March 10, 2025, Hosoya announced on Twitter that he had married someone outside the entertainment industry.

== Filmography ==
=== Anime series ===
Year	Title	Role	Notes
2005	Aria the Animation	Crowd	Ep. 12
2005	Gallery Fake	Shuttle Crew, Young Man	
2005	Naruto	ANBU, Fuuta Kagetsu, Postman Ninja 893-03, Ship Guard #1, Star Genin A	
2006	Cluster Edge	Cluster Students	
2006	Eureka Seven	Caster	
2006	Fairy Musketeers	Prince	
2006	Fighting Beauty Wulong	Student	
2006	Living for the Day After Tomorrow	Night-life man	Ep. 7
2006	Muteki Kanban Musume	Customer 3	Ep. 7
2006	Nana	Conductor	
2006	Onegai My Melody Kuru Kuru Shuffle!	Ryosuke Egusa	
2006	Project Blue Earth SOS	Operator C	Ep. 1
2006	Rakugo Tennyo Oyui	Sen Isawa, Warship Captain, Footmen Specter	
2006	Ramen Fighter Miki	Customer 3	Ep. 7
2007	Big Windup!	Hiiragi	
2007	ef a tale of memories	Staff Member	
2007	Ghost Hound	Male student	Ep. 1
2007	Good Luck! Ninomiya-kun	Student	
2007	Jinzo Konchu Kabuto Borg VxV	Taj Mahado Mohamed Al Saud, Anjorasu	
2007	Kaze no Stigma	Youngman	
2007	Moyashimon	Masked man C	Ep. 7
2007	Over Drive	Audience	
2007	Shinkyoku Sōkai Polyphonica	Criminal B	Ep. 9
2007	Tokyo Majin Gakuen Kenpucho: Tou 2nd Act	Kinoko	
2008	Casshern Sins	Elle	
2008	Dazzle	Male	
2008	Gunslinger Girl: Il Teatrino	Amadeo	Ep. 5, 10
2008	Hatenkō Yugi	Man	Ep. 8-9
2008	Monochrome Factor	Juvenile Delinquent	Ep. 1
2008	Slayers Revolution	Street Person A	Ep. 9
2008	Yu-Gi-Oh! 5D's	Dick Pitt	
2009	Golgo 13	SDR2 Pilot	Ep. 49
2009	Jewelpet	Arato	
2009	Naruto: Shippuden	Kigiri	
2009	Ookiku Furikabutte: Natsu no Taikai-hen	Yoshiyuki Matsuda	
2009	Sengoku Basara: Samurai Kings	Miyoshi Trio Brother	
2009	Tegami Bachi	McKay Gee	
2010	Beyblade: Metal Masters	Wales	
2010	Katanagatari	Shichika Yasuri	
2010	Lilpri	Yoichi	
2010	Maid Sama!	Ryūnosuke Kurosaki	
2010	Ookiku Furikabutte: Natsu no Taikai-hen	Yoshiyuki Matsuda	
2011	47 Todō-fu Inu	Hiroshima Dog	
2011	Beyblade: Metal Fury	Wales	
2011	Chihayafuru	Wataya Arata	
2011	I Don't Like You at All, Big Brother!!	Receive B	
2011	Level E	Yukitaka Tsutsui	
2011	Moshidora	Jun Hoshide	
2011	Natsume's Book of Friends 3	Katsumi Shibata	Ep. 3
2011	No. 6	Nezumi	
2011	Pokémon – Best Wishes!	Charles	Ep. 57
2011	Yu-Gi-Oh! Zexal	IV/Thomas Arclight	
2012	Beyblade: Shogun Steel	Kira Hayama	
2012	Ginga e Kickoff!!	Ozo Furuya	
2012	Inu × Boku SS	Rensho Sorinozuka	
2012	Kuroko's Basketball	Junpei Hyūga	
2012	Magi: The Labyrinth of Magic	Masrur	
2012	Robotics;Notes	Subaru Hidaka	
2012	Sakamichi no Apollon	Sentaro Kawabuchi	
2012	The Prince of Tennis II	Kuranosuke Shiraishi	
2013	Ace of Diamond	Tetsuya Yūki	
2013	Attack on Titan	Reiner Braun	
2013	Brothers Conflict	Yūsuke Asahina	
2013	Chihayafuru 2	Wataya Arata	
2013	Devils and Realist	Rashirudo	
2013	High School DxD New	Michael	
2013	Ixion Saga DT	Pet	
2013	Jewelpet Happiness	Kosuke Sanada	
2013	Kingdom 2	Ō Hon	
2013	Kimi no Iru Machi	Haruto Kirishima	
2013	Kuroko's Basketball 2	Junpei Hyūga	
2013	Magi: The Kingdom of Magic	Masrur	
2013	Space Battleship Yamato 2199	Saburō Katō	
2013	Strike the Blood	Kojou Akatsuki	
2013	Valvrave the Liberator	X-eins	
2013	Valvrave the Liberator 2	X-eins	
2014	Akame ga Kill!	Wave	
2014	Aldnoah.Zero	Humeray	
2014	Baby Steps	Souji Ike	
2014	Black Bullet	Tamaki Katagiri	
2014	Chaika - The Coffin Princess	Alveric Gillett	
2014	Chaika – The Coffin Princess: Avenging Battle	Alveric Gillett	
2014	Free! Eternal Summer	Yamazaki Sousuke	
2014	Gundam Build Fighters Try	Saga Adou	
2014	Haikyu!!	Azumane Asahi	
2014	Hozuki's Coolheadedness	Gon	Ep. 13
2014	Kamigami no Asobi	Loki Laevatein	
2014	La Corda d'Oro Blue Sky	Mutsumi Serizawa	
2014	Nanana's Buried Treasure	Tetsunoshin Tsujimi	
2014	Ōkami Shōjo to Kuro Ōji	Takeru Hibiya	
2014	One Week Friends	Shōgo Kiryū	
2014	Terra Formars	Akari Hizamaru	
2014	When Supernatural Battles Became Commonplace	Shizumu Sagami	
2014	Yu-Gi-Oh! Arc-V	Reiji Akaba	
2015	Ace of Diamond: Second Season	Tetsuya Yūki	
2015	Attack on Titan: Junior High	Reiner Braun	
2015	Baby Steps Season 2	Souji Ike	
2015	Charlotte	Kōta	Ep. 3
2015	Chivalry of a Failed Knight	Kuraudo Kurashiki	
2015	Death Parade	Ginti	
2015	Haikyu!! Second Season	Azumane Asahi	
2015	High School DxD BorN	Michael	
2015	Is It Wrong to Try to Pick Up Girls in a Dungeon?	Welf Crozzo	
2015	Kuroko's Basketball 3	Junpei Hyūga	
2015	Makura no Danshi	Kanade Hanamine	
2015	Mikagura School Suite	Kyoma Kuzuryu	
2015	Minna Atsumare! Falcom Gakuen SC	Gaius Worzel	
2015	Miss Monochrome Season 3	Makurerō	
2015	Mobile Suit Gundam: Iron-Blooded Orphans	Orga Itsuka	
2015	One-Punch Man	Iaian	
2015	Q Transformers: Return of the Mystery of Convoy	Optimus Prime	
2015	Q Transformer: Saranaru Ninkimono e no Michi	Optimus Prime	
2015	Seraph of the End: Battle in Nagoya	Makoto Narumi	
2015	Show by Rock!!	Rom	
2015	Star-Myu: High School Star Musical	Kakeru Tengenji	
2015	Tai-Madō Gakuen 35 Shiken Shōtai	Takeru Kusanagi	
2015	The Heroic Legend of Arslan	Daryun	
2015	The Rolling Girls	Tomoki Suzuka	
2015	Ultimate Otaku Teacher	Seijūrō Nanami	
2015	Ushio and Tora	Nagare Akiba	
2016	Ajin: Demi-Human	Kaito	
2016	All Out!!	Takuya Sekizan	
2016	BBK/BRNK	Epizo Evans	
2016	BBK/BRNK Hoshi no Kyojin	Epizo Evans	
2016	Bungo Stray Dogs	Doppo Kunikida	
2016	Bungo Stray Dogs 2	Doppo Kunikida	
2016	Danganronpa 3: The End of Hope's Peak High School	Kazuichi Soda	
2016	Grimgar of Fantasy and Ash	Haruhiro	
2016	Haikyū!! Karasuno High School vs Shiratorizawa Academy	Azumane Asahi	
2016	Handa-kun	Akane Tsutsui	
2016	Heavy Object	Sladder Honeysuckle	
2016	Hundred	Judal Harvey	
2016	Izetta: The Last Witch	Bassler	
2016	Joker Game	Odagiri	
2016	March Comes in like a Lion	Takahashi Yūsuke	
2016	Mobile Suit Gundam: Iron-Blooded Orphans Season 2	Orga Itsuka	
2016	My Hero Academia	Fumikage Tokoyami	
2016	Mob Psycho 100	Tenga Onigawara, Yusuke Sakurai	
2016	Nanbaka	Musashi (Prisoner Number 634)	
2016	Naruto: Shippuden	Hamura Ōtsutsuki	
2016	Pokémon Generations	Wataru	
2016	Servamp	Kurumamori Junichirou	
2016	Show by Rock!!♯	Rom	
2016	Show By Rock!! Short!!	Rom	
2016	Tanaka-kun Is Always Listless	Ohta	
2016	Terra Formars: Revenge	Akari Hizamaru	
2016	The Disastrous Life of Saiki K.	Kuboyasu Aren	
2016	Tsukiuta. THE ANIMATION	Uzuki Arata	
2016	The Heroic Legend of Arslan: Dust Storm Dance	Daryun	
2016	WWW.WORKING!!	Kōki Saiki	
2016	Yuri!!! on Ice	Otabek Altin	
2017	Attack on Titan 2	Reiner Braun	
2017	Chō Shōnen Tantei-dan NEO	Akechi Kogorō	
2017	Hozuki's Coolheadedness 2	Gon	
2017	Kenka Bancho Otome: Girl Beats Boys	Kira Rintarou	
2017	March Comes in like a Lion 2	Takahashi Yūsuke	
2017	My Hero Academia 2	Fumikage Tokoyami	
2017	Nanbaka 2	Musashi (Prisoner Number 634)	
2017	Natsume's Book of Friends 6	Katsumi Shibata	Ep. 3
2017	Onihei	Kumehachi	
2017	Star-Myu: High School Star Musical 2	Kakeru Tengenji	
2018	100 Sleeping Princes and the Kingdom of Dreams	Graysia	
2018	Attack on Titan 3	Reiner Braun	
2018	Banana Fish	Frederick Arthur	
2018	Black Clover	Kiato	
2018	Boarding School Juliet	Tosa Kento	
2018	Caligula	Tomoe Kotarou	
2018	Dances with the Dragons	Gigina Jerde Dolk Melios Ashley Boeuf	
2018	Devils' Line	Sawazaki Takashi	
2018	Free! Dive to the Future	Yamazaki Sousuke	
2018	Gakuen Babysitters	Inui Hiroyuki	
2018	Golden Kamuy	Genjirō Tanigaki	
2018	Golden Kamuy 2	Genjirō Tanigaki	
2018	Hakyū Hoshin Engi	Ko Hiko	
2018	Hataraku Oniisan!	Sukoyama senpai, Tanuki, Shark, Orca	
2018	High School DxD Hero	Michael	
2018	Hinomaru Sumo	Hikage Tenma	
2018	Junji Ito Collection	Kōichi, Oda, Aoyama, husband, Makita Shuichi, Joe, Hikaru Shibayama, Kameda	
2018	Megalobox	Joe / Junk Dog	
2018	My Hero Academia 3	Fumikage Tokoyami	
2018	Shinkansen Henkei Robo Shinkalion THE ANIMATION	Byakko	
2018	Space Battleship Yamato 2202: Warriors of Love TV series	Saburō Katō	
2018	That Time I Got Reincarnated as a Slime	Yohm Farmenas	
2018	The Disastrous Life of Saiki K. 2	Kuboyasu Aren	
2018	WASIMO	Gunman Wasimo	
2018	Yuuna and the Haunted Hot Springs	Genshiro Ryuuga	
2019	Ace of Diamond Act II	Narrator, Tetsuya Yūki	
2019	Assassins Pride	Serge Schicksal	
2019	Astra Lost in Space	Kanata Hoshijima	
2019	BEM	Gavin Briggs	
2019	Boogiepop and Others	Ausukai Jin	
2019	Bungo Stray Dogs 3	Doppo Kunikida	
2019	Chihayafuru 3	Wataya Arata	
2019	Demon Slayer: Kimetsu no Yaiba	Kaigaku	
2019	Detective Conan 27	Naitō Tatsuki	
2019	Fairy Gone	Wolfran Row	
2019	Inazuma Eleven: Orion no Kokuin	Bernard Girikanan	
2019	Is It Wrong to Try to Pick Up Girls in a Dungeon? II	Welf Crozzo	
2019	Kakegurui ××	Obami Ibara	
2019	Kono Oto Tomare! Sounds of Life	Takaoka Tetsuki	
2019	Meiji Tokyo Renka	Tōsuke Iwasaki	
2019	Mob Psycho 100 II	Tenga Onigawara, Yusuke Sakurai	
2019	My Hero Academia 4	Fumikage Tokoyami	
2019	Sarazanmai	Mabu Akutsu	
2019	Star-Myu: High School Star Musical 3	Kakeru Tengenji	
2019	Star Twinkle PreCure	Kappard	
2020	Attack on Titan: The Final Season	Reiner Braun	
2020	BNA: Brand New Animal	Shirou Ogami	
2020	Dorohedoro	Shin	
2020	Golden Kamuy 3	Genjirō Tanigaki	
2020	Grand Blues!	Belial	
2020	Haikyu!! To The Top	Azumane Asahi	
2020	Hatena Illusion	Mamoru Hoshisato	
2020	ID: Invaded	Funetaro Momoki	
2020	Is It Wrong to Try to Pick Up Girls in a Dungeon? III	Welf Crozzo	
2020	Kingdom 3	Ō Hon	
2020	Show by Rock!! Mashumairesh!!	Rom	Ep. 7
2020	Tsukiuta. THE ANIMATION 2	Uzuki Arata	
2020	Yashahime: Princess Half-Demon	Kirinmaru, Osamu Kirin	
2020	Yo-kai Gakuen Y: N to no Sōgū	Ozero	Ep. 46
2021	Bungo Stray Dogs Wan!	Doppo Kunikida	
2021	Dragon Goes House-Hunting	Steve	
2021	Fruits Basket: The Final	Katsuya Honda	
2021	Hortensia Saga	Alfred Ober	
2021	I'm Standing on a Million Lives Season 2	Thanzamer	
2021	Megalobox 2: Nomad	Joe / Nomad	
2021	My Hero Academia 5	Fumikage Tokoyami	
2021	Sakugan	Merooro	
2021	Show by Rock!! Stars!!	Rom	
2021	That Time I Got Reincarnated as a Slime Season 2	Yohm Farmenas	
2021	The Promised Neverland 2nd Season	Peter Ratri	
2021	The Slime Diaries: That Time I Got Reincarnated as a Slime	Yohm Farmenas	
2021	The Vampire Dies in No Time	Satetsu	
2021	Those Snow White Notes	Wakana Sawamura	
2021	Yashahime: Princess Half-Demon – The Second Act	Kirinmaru, Osamu Kirin	
2022	Crayon Shin-chan	Semashi Nohara	
2022	Fuuto PI	Shotaro Hidari	
2022	Golden Kamuy 4	Genjirō Tanigaki	
2022	Is It Wrong to Try to Pick Up Girls in a Dungeon? IV	Welf Crozzo	
2022	Kingdom 4	Ō Hon	
2022	Mob Psycho 100 III	Tenga Onigawara, Yusuke Sakurai	
2022	My Hero Academia 6	Fumikage Tokoyami	
2022	The Prince of Tennis II: U-17 World Cup	Kuranosuke Shiraishi	
2022	The Yakuza's Guide to Babysitting	Tōru Kirishima	
2023	Bungo Stray Dogs 4	Doppo Kunikida	
2023	Bungo Stray Dogs 5	Doppo Kunikida	
2023	Dead Mount Death Play	Kuon Higuro	
2023	Kaina of the Great Snow Sea	Kaina	
2023	The Fire Hunter	Roroku	
2023	The Vampire Dies in No Time 2	Satetsu	
2023	Trigun Stampede	Nicholas D. Wolfwood	
2024	Atri: My Dear Moments	Ryuuji Nojima	
2024	Bang Brave Bang Bravern	Ryuji Satake	
2024	Captain Tsubasa: Junior Youth Arc	Deuter Muller	
2024	Doctor Elise	Graham de Fallon	
2024	Is It Wrong to Try to Pick Up Girls in a Dungeon? V	Welf Crozzo	
2024	Kingdom 5	Ō Hon	
2024	My Hero Academia 7	Fumikage Tokoyami	
2024	The Dangers in My Heart	Yamada's Father	
2024	The Fire Hunter 2	Roroku	
2025	April Showers Bring May Flowers	Tetsuo Gotanda	
2025	Miru: Paths to My Future	Miru	
2025	My Hero Academia: Final Season	Fumikage Tokoyami	
2025	Yaiba: Samurai Legend	Takeshi Onimaru	
2026	Petals of Reincarnation	Itsuki Kitazuka	
TBA	Trigun Stampede Kanketsu-hen	Nicholas D. Wolfwood	

=== Original video animation ===
Year	Title	Role	Notes
2005	Banner of the Stars III	Crew	
2006	The Prince of Tennis: The National Tournament	Kuranosuke Shiraishi	
2007	The Prince of Tennis: The National Tournament Semifinal	Kuranosuke Shiraishi	
2008	The Prince of Tennis: The National Tournament Final	Kuranosuke Shiraishi	
2009	Denpa teki na Kanojo	Jū Jūzawa	
2009	The Prince of Tennis: Another Story	Kuranosuke Shiraishi	
2011	Kings of My Love	Kyouya Isshiki	
2011	The Prince of Tennis: Another Story 2	Kuranosuke Shiraishi	
2012	Kuroko's Basketball FAN DISC ~Owaranai Natsu~	Junpei Hyuga	
2012	Hori-san to Miyamura-kun: Shin Gakki	Tōru Ishikawa	
2013	A Town Where You Live	Haruto Kirishima	
2013	Chihayafuru Vol.22 OVA	Wataya Arata	
2013	Kuroko's Basketball: Baka ja katenai noyo!	Junpei Hyuga	
2014	Alice in Borderland	Ryōhei Arisu	
2014	Brothers Conflict OVA: Christmas	Yusuke Asahina	
2014	Fantasista Stella	Ozuma	
2014	Haikyū!! Lev Kenzan!	Asahi Azumane	
2014	Hori-san to Miyamura-kun: Totsuzen no Ame	Tōru Ishikawa	
2014	Hōzuki no Reitetsu	Gon	
2014	Kuroko's Basketball FAN DISC ~Hikari Sasu Basho He~	Junpei Hyuga	
2015	Brothers Conflict OVA: Valentine's Day	Yusuke Asahina	
2015	Chaika – The Coffin Princess: Avenging Battle OAD	Alveric Gillett	
2015	Free!: Eternal Summer – Kindan no All Hard!	Yamazaki Sousuke	
2015	Hori-san to Miyamura-kun: Sukida	Tōru Ishikawa	
2015	Strike the Blood: Valkyria no Ōkoku-hen	Kojou Akatsuki	
2016	Is It Wrong to Try to Pick Up Girls in a Dungeon? OVA	Welf Crozzo	
2016	Star-Myu: High School Star Musical OVA Vol.1	Kakeru Tengenji	
2016	Star-Myu: High School Star Musical OVA Vol.2	Kakeru Tengenji	
2016	Strike the Blood II Vol.1 – 2	Kojou Akatsuki	
2016	The Heroic Legend of Arslan Vol.5 OVA	Daryun	
2016	The Heroic Legend of Arslan Vol.6 OVA	Daryun	
2017	Attack on Titan Vol.24 – Lost Girls OAD 1 – Wall Sina, Goodbye	Reiner Braun	
2017	Bungo Stray Dogs Vol.13 OVA – Hitori Ayumu	Kunikida Doppo	
2017	My Hero Academia Vol.13 – Save! Rescue Training	Fumikage Tokoyami	
2017	My Hero Academia Vol.14 – Training of the Dead	Fumikage Tokoyami	
2017	Nanbaka OVA – Shusseki Bangō no Tsuita Baka-tachi	Musashi (Student Number 634)	
2017	Strike the Blood II Vol.3 – 4	Kojou Akatsuki	
2017	Super Danganronpa 2.5: Komaeda Nagito to Sekai no Hakaisha	Kazuichi Soda	
2018	Hori-san to Miyamura-kun: Natsu Kaze	Tōru Ishikawa	
2018	Ito Junji "Collection" – Tomie OVA	Doctor	
2018	Mob Psycho 100 Reigen -The Miraculous Unknown Psychic-	Yusuke Sakurai	
2018	Oshie to Tabi Suru Otoko	Older Brother	
2018	Star-Myu: High School Star Musical OVA Vol.3- STAR-MYU in Halloween	Kakeru Tengenji	
2018	Strike the Blood III Vol.1	Kojou Akatsuki	
2018	Terra Formars Vol.21: BORN TO BE GUARDIAN Tatakau Riyū	Akari Hizamaru	
2018	Terra Formars Vol.22: THE LIFE OF INVOKING Ai Seibutsu-tachi	Akari Hizamaru	
2019	Double Decker! Doug & Kirill EX episode 2 – Infernal Affair	Yusef bin Saeed Al Atal	
2019	Strike the Blood III Vol.2 – 5	Kojou Akatsuki	
2020	Dorohedoro Bonus Curse – Ma no Omake	Shin	
2020	Golden Kamuy Vol.23: Shiton Animal Chronicles	Genjirō Tanigaki	
2020	Hōzuki no Reitetsu Vol. 30 OAD	Gon	
2020	Is It Wrong to Try to Pick Up Girls in a Dungeon? OVA II	Welf Crozzo	
2020	My Hero Academia: Survive! Do-or-Die Survival Training	Fumikage Tokoyami	
2020	Strike the Blood Kieta Seisō-hen	Kojou Akatsuki	
2020	Strike the Blood IV Vol.1 – 4	Kojou Akatsuki	
2021	Hori-san to Miyamura-kun: Manatsubi	Tōru Ishikawa	
2021	Hori-san to Miyamura-kun: Yasashī Hito	Tōru Ishikawa	
2021	Is It Wrong to Try to Pick Up Girls in a Dungeon? OVA IV	Welf Crozzo	
2021	Strike the Blood IV Vol.5 – 6	Kojou Akatsuki	
2022	Strike the Blood V	Kojou Akatsuki	
2023	Stand My Heroes: Warmth of Memories	Saotome Ikuto	

=== Original net animation ===
Year	Title	Role	Notes
2015	Osiris no Tenbin	Nameless	
2016	Whistle! 'Voice Remake'	Eishi Kaku	
2019	Fight League: Gear Gadget Generators	Bolt	
2019	The Disastrous Life of Saiki K. Reawakened	Kuboyasu Aren	
2020	Cagaster of an Insect Cage	Kido	
2020	Oblivion Battery	Haruka Kiyomine	
2021	Honkai Impact 3 [Reburn: II] Concept Animated Short	Welt Yang	
2021	The Way of the Househusband	Torajirō	
2021	Ukishiro-chan	Ishida Mitsunari	
2022	Kango Channel Nursing Day 2022	Nurse	
2022	Punishing: Gray Raven – Panigure Gekijō	Watanabe	
2022	Spriggan	Iwao Akatsuki	
2022	Thermae Romae Novae	Ceionius	
2023	Junji Ito Maniac: Japanese Tales of the Macabre	Kōichi	
2023	The Way of the Househusband 2	Torajirō	
2024	Garouden: The Way of the Lone Wolf	Nyoze Carlos Nagato	
2024	Monsters: 103 Mercies Dragon Damnation	Shimotsuki Ryuma	
TBA	Dorohedoro Zoku-hen	Shin	

=== Anime films ===
Year	Title	Role	Notes
2011	The Prince of Tennis: Tennis no Ouji-sama Eikoku-shiki Teikyū-jō Kessen!	Kuranosuke Shiraishi	
2012	A Letter to Momo	Telephone Operator	
2013	Hal	Hal	
2014	Attack on Titan – Part 1: Crimson Bow and Arrow	Reiner Braun	
2014	Space Battleship Yamato 2199: A Voyage to Remember	Saburō Katō	
2014	Space Battleship Yamato 2199: Odyssey of the Celestial Ark	Saburō Katō	
2015	Ajin Part 1: Shōdō	Kaito	
2015	Attack on Titan – Part 2: Wings of Freedom	Reiner Braun	
2015	Cyborg 009 Vs. Devilman	Edward/Cyborg 0014	
2015	Digimon Adventure tri. – Saikai	Yamato Ishida	
2015	Gekijōban Haikyu!! Owari to Hajimari	Asahi Azumane	
2015	Gekijōban Haikyu!! Shōsha to Haisha	Asahi Azumane	
2015	Gekijōban Meiji Tokyo Renka: Yumihari no Serenade	Tōsuke Iwasaki	
2015	High Speed! Free! Starting Days	Yamazaki Sousuke	
2015	The Anthem of the Heart	Daiki Tazaki	
2015	The Empire of Corpses	John H. Watson	
2016	Ajin Part 2: Shōtotsu	Kaito	
2016	Ajin Part 3: Shōgeki	Kaito	
2016	Digimon Adventure tri. – Ketsui	Yamato Ishida	
2016	Digimon Adventure tri. – Kokuhaku	Yamato Ishida	
2016	Gekijōban Meiji Tokyo Renka: Hana Kagami no Fantasia	Tōsuke Iwasaki	
2016	In This Corner of the World	Houjou Shūsaku	
2016	Kuroko's Basketball Winter Cup Compilation ~Beyond the Tears~	Junpei Hyūga	
2016	Kuroko's Basketball Winter Cup Compilation ~Crossing the Door~	Junpei Hyūga	
2016	Kuroko's Basketball Winter Cup Compilation ~Shadow and Light~	Junpei Hyūga	
2016	Suki ni Naru Sono Shunkan o: Kokuhaku Jikkō Iinkai	Shibasaki Ken	
2017	Digimon Adventure tri. – Sōshitsu	Yamato Ishida	
2017	Digimon Adventure tri. – Kyōsei	Yamato Ishida	
2017	Free! -Timeless Medley- Kizuna	Yamazaki Sousuke	
2017	Free! -Timeless Medley- Yakusoku	Yamazaki Sousuke	
2017	Free! Take Your Marks	Yamazaki Sousuke	
2017	Haikyu!! Sainō to Sense	Azumane Asahi	
2017	Haikyu!! Concept no Tatakai	Azumane Asahi	
2017	Kuroko's Basketball The Movie: Last Game	Junpei Hyūga	
2017	Space Battleship Yamato 2202: Warriors of Love – Junai-hen	Saburō Katō	
2018	Attack on Titan – The Roar of Awakening	Reiner Braun	
2018	Bungo Stray Dogs: DEAD APPLE	Kunikida Doppo	
2018	Digimon Adventure tri. – Bokura no mirai	Yamato Ishida	
2018	Maquia: When the Promised Flower Blooms	Lang	
2018	Monster Strike the Movie: Sora no Kanata	Tōya	
2018	My Hero Academia: Two Heroes	Fumikage Tokoyami	
2018	Space Battleship Yamato 2202: Warriors of Love – Tenmei-hen	Saburō Katō	
2018	Space Battleship Yamato 2202: Warriors of Love – Rengoku-hen	Saburō Katō	
2018	Space Battleship Yamato 2202: Warriors of Love – Kaisei-hen	Saburō Katō	
2019	Free! ~Road to the World~ Yume	Yamazaki Sousuke	
2019	In This Corner (and Other Corners) of the World	Houjou Shūsaku	
2019	Is It Wrong to Try to Pick Up Girls in a Dungeon?: Arrow of the Orion	Welf Crozzo	
2019	My Hero Academia: Heroes Rising	Fumikage Tokoyami	
2019	Shinkansen Henkei Robo Shinkalion the Movie	Byakko	
2019	Space Battleship Yamato 2202: Warriors of Love – Shinsei-hen	Saburō Katō	
2019	Tannishō o Hiraku	Sōken	
2020	Attack on Titan: Chronicle	Reiner Braun	
2020	Digimon Adventure: Last Evolution Kizuna	Yamato Ishida	
2020	Mouseman: Ai no Katamari	Mouseman	
2021	Free!–the Final Stroke– Zenpen	Yamazaki Sousuke	
2021	My Hero Academia: World Heroes' Mission	Fumikage Tokoyami	
2021	Ryōma! Shinsei Gekijōban Tennis no Ōji-sama	Kuranosuke Shiraishi	
2021	Space Battleship Yamato 2205: Aratanaru Tabidachi	Saburō Katō	
2021	Space Battleship Yamato to Iu Jidai: Seireki 2202-nen no Sentaku	Saburō Katō	
2022	Break of Dawn	Ryō Sawatari	
2022	Free!–the Final Stroke– Kouhen	Yamazaki Sousuke	
2022	Fruits Basket: Prelude	Katsuya Honda	
2022	Mouseman: Dark Child	Mouseman	
2023	Kaina of the Great Snow Sea: Star Sage	Kaina	
2023	Komada: A Whisky Family	Yasumoto	
2024	Haikyu!! The Dumpster Battle	Asahi Azumane	
2024	My Hero Academia: You're Next	Fumikage Tokoyami	
2024	Tsukiuta. Rabbits Kingdom the Movie	Uzuki Arata	
2024	Kuramerukagari	Eiwa-jima	
2024	Fuuto PI: The Portrait of Kamen Rider Skull	Shotaro Hidari	
2025	Demon Slayer: Kimetsu no Yaiba – The Movie: Infinity Castle	Kaigaku	
2026	The Ribbon Hero	Rock	
TBA	Haikyu!! vs. The Little Giant	Asahi Azumane	

=== Video games ===
Year	Title	Role	Notes
2004	Sentimental Prelude	Tokumitsu	
2005	Astro Kyūdan Kessen! ! Victory Kyūdan-hen	Ijuinkyu Saburo	
2006	Inukami! feat. Animation	Soba shop clerk	
2006	Princess Maker 5	Akizuki Shinya	
2006	Shinkyoku Sōkai Polyphonica ~Episode 1&2 Box Edition~	Kawatsu	
2007	The Prince of Tennis Driving Smash – Side Genius	Kuranosuke Shiraishi	
2007	The Prince of Tennis Driving Smash – Side King	Kuranosuke Shiraishi	
2008	Asaki, Yumemishi	Ichito	
2008	Edel Blume	Auguste Muller	
2008	Sigma Harmonics	Nagaito Shiki	
2009	Arcana Heart 3	Kazu	
2009	Final Fantasy XIII	Cocoon Citizen	
2009	Sin & Punishment: Star Successor	Isa Jo	
2009	Souten no Kanata	Ryoyuu	
2010	Blue Roses: The Fairy and the Blue Eyed Warriors	Marius	
2010	Kin'iro no Corda 3	Serizawa Mutsumi	
2010	Metal Fight Beyblade Portable Transcendent Reincarnation Vulcan Horseus	Wales	
2010	Metal Fight Beyblade Summit Battle! Big Bang Braders	Wales	
2010	The Prince of Tennis: Motto Gakuensai no Oujisama -More Sweet Edition-	Kuranosuke Shiraishi	
2011	Gachitora: The Roughneck Teacher in High School	Natsume Soji	
2011	Musketeer: Le Sang des Chevaliers	Athos	
2011	Sto☆Mani ~Strobe☆Mania~	Kagura Jin	
2011	The Prince of Tennis: Gyutto! Doki Doki Survival Umi to Yama no Love Passion	Kuranosuke Shiraishi	
2011	Treasure Report Mechanical Legacy	Logan	
2011	Way of the Samurai 4	Jinrai Kogure	
2012	Black Wolves Saga ~Bloody Nightmare~	Julian Von Garibaldi	
2012	Black Wolves Saga ~Last Hope~	Julian Von Garibaldi	
2012	Brothers Conflict: Passion Pink	Yusuke Asahina	
2012	Corpse Party the Anthology: Sachiko's Game of Love – Hysteric Birthday 2U	Kentaro Oshio	
2012	Custom Drive	Mayuzumi Ruka	
2012	Danganronpa 2: Goodbye Despair	Kazuichi Soda (Super High School Level Mechanic)	
2012	Fire Emblem Awakening	Gimle/Grima, Marc/Morgan, Reflet/Robin	
2012	Heroes Phantasia	Eiji Watanabe	
2012	Hitofuta Kitan	Kairi Nanao	
2012	Kuroko no Basket: Kiseki no Game	Hyūga Junpei	
2012	Phantasy Star Online 2	Male Voice #83	
2012	Rhythm Thief & the Emperor's Treasure	Raphael	
2012	Robotics;Notes	Subaru Hidaka	
2012	Shirahana no Ori ~Hiiro no Kakera 4~ Shiki no Uta	Aterui	
2012	Street Fighter X Tekken	Steve Fox	
2012	Tales of Xillia 2	Clark	
2012	Time Travelers	Yuuri Fukase	
2012	Wajin Ibunroku ~Asaki, Yumemishi~	Rurou	
2012	Warriors Orochi 3	Abe no Seimei	
2012	Zero Escape: Virtue's Last Reward	Dio	
2013	Amnesia Crowd	Luka	
2013	Brothers Conflict: Brilliant Blue	Yusuke Asahina	
2013	Getsuei Gakuen – Kou –	Touyama Kou	
2013	Shirahana no Ori ~Hiiro no Kakera 4~	Aterui	
2013	Kamigami no Asobi	Loki Laevatein	
2013	Magi: Hajimari no Meikyū	Masrur	
2013	Makai Ōji: Devils and Realist: Treasure of the Substitute King	Rashild	
2013	Metal Gear Rising: Revengeance	LQ-84i/Bladewolf	
2013	O*G*A Oni-Gokko Royale Hunter wa Field de Koi o Suru	Tsukumo Haruto & Tsukumo Yato (Twin brothers)	
2013	Princess Arthur	Mordred	
2013	Romeo VS Juliet	Tybalt Capulet	
2013	Shirahana no Ori ~Hiiro no Kakera 4~ Shiki no Uta	Aterui	
2013	The Legend of Heroes: Trails of Cold Steel	Gaius Worzel	
2013	Xblaze Code: Embryo	Kamewari Akira	
2013	Yu-Gi-Oh! Zexal: Clash! Duel Carnival	IV	
2014	Amnesia Later x Crowd V Edition	Luka	
2014	Amnesia World	Luka	
2014	Dengeki Bunko: Fighting Climax	Kojou Akatsuki	
2014	Enkeltbillet	Alexander Nielsen	
2014	Haikyu!! Tsunage! Itadaki no Keshiki!!	Asahi Azumane	
2014	Kin'iro no Corda 3 AnotherSky	Serizawa Mutsumi	
2014	Kuroko no Basuke -Shōri e no Kiseki-	Hyūga Junpei	
2014	Magi: Aratanaru no Sekai	Masrur	
2014	Rage of Bahamut	Vail	
2014	Robotics;Notes Elite	Subaru Hidaka	
2014	Romeo & Juliet	Tybalt Capulet	
2014	Super Smash Bros. for Nintendo 3DS and Wii U	Reflet/Robin	
2014	The Legend of Heroes: Trails of Cold Steel II	Gaius Worzel	
2014	Thousand Memories	Kuroto	
2015	18: Kimi to Tsunagaru Puzzle	Diver	
2015	100 Sleeping Princes and the Kingdom of Dreams	Graysia, Rege	
2015	Arslan: The Warriors of Legend	Daryun	
2015	Dragon's Dogma Online	Fabio	
2015	Dragon Quest VIII 3DS	Kukule	
2015	Ensemble Stars!	Hokuto Hidaka	2015–2017
2015	Final Fantasy: Brave Exvius	Jake	
2015	Fire Emblem If	Shigure	
2015	Genei Ibun Roku#FE	Yashiro Tsurugi	
2015	Hortensia Saga: Ao no Kishidan	Protagonist	
2015	Hyakka Yako	Yukinari	
2015	I DOLL U	Moroboshi Seiya	
2015	Ikemen Sengoku: Toki o Kakeru Koi	Sanada Yukimura	2015–2017
2015	INFINITE DRIVE	Ares	
2015	Kokuchou no Psychedelica	Yamato	
2015	Kuroko no Basket: Mirai e no Kizuna	Hyūga Junpei	
2015	Minna no Dena Ranger 〜 tachiagare Nihon-hen 〜	Kaishin Geki	
2015	Pop up story mahō no hon to seiki no gakuen	Alvin Grand Ford	
2015	Quiz RPG: The World of Mystic Wiz	Eternal Lore	
2015	Ren'ai gēmu "Makura Danshi ~ amai yumenotsudzuki ~	Hanamine Kanade	
2015	Ryūkyū ibun shu ō no tsunagi	Ken Ryō	
2015	Seraph of the End: Bloody Blades	Narumi Makoto	
2015	Seraph of the End: Unmei no Hajimari	Narumi Makoto	
2015	Shūten no Träumerei kōshiki	Edward	
2015	Terra Formars akaki wakusei no gekitō	Hizamaru Akari	
2015	The Prince of Tennis〜Go to the top〜	Kuranosuke Shiraishi	
2015	Thousand Memories	Russell	
2015	Tsukino Park	Uzuki Arata	
2015	Tsuki to suna no renshi	Atlarge	
2015	VALIANT KNIGHTS	Xex	
2015	White Cat Project	Aix	
2015	Xblaze Lost: Memories	Kamewari Akira	
2016	Akashic Re:cords	"Hyōshitō" Linz Romeo, "Shunsoku no Wakagoma" Achilles	
2016	Attack on Titan	Reiner Braun	
2016	Brothers Conflict: Precious Baby	Yusuke Asahina	
2016	Chain Chronicle ~Kizuna no Shintairiku~	Welf Crozzo	
2016	Caligula	Tomoe Kotarou	
2016	Dragon Quest Heroes II	Kukule	
2016	Fantasy Drive	Nagakura Shinpachi	
2016	Granblue Fantasy	Bowman	
2016	Haikyu!! Cross team match!	Asahi Azumane	
2016	Icchibanketsu ONLINE	Jiraiya	
2016	Kamigami no Asobi InFinite	Loki Laevatein	
2016	Kenka Banchou Otome	Kira Rintarou	
2016	Kin'iro no Corda 4	Serizawa Mutsumi	
2016	Love Scramble	Amano Haruto	
2016	Meiji Tokei Koi Togi Full Moon	Iwasaki Tousuke	
2016	Mèng Jiān Jí	Miàoshǒu báishàn	
2016	MITRASPHERE	Xenon Illankost	
2016	Mob Psycho 100 ~ Psychic Puzzle ~	Onigawara Tenga, Yusuke Sakurai	
2016	My Hero Academia: Battle for All	Tokoyami Fumikage	
2016	Oumagatoki ~Kakuriyo no Enishi~	Hayate	
2016	Pachislot Terra Formars	Hizamaru Akari	
2016	Phantasy Star Online 2	Yasaka Enga	
2016	PsychicEmotion6	Minase Aoi	
2016	Riajū hajimemashita	Kosaka Kaede	
2016	Sengoku Basara: Sanada Yukimura-Den	Sanada Nobuyuki	
2016	Sevens Story	Grand	
2016	Space Battleship Yamato 2199 × Sky Craft Fleet	Saburō Katō	
2016	Yakuza 6: The Song of Life	Naoto Tagashira	
2016	Yīnyáng shī (Onmyoji)	Qīng Fāngzhǔ (Aobouzu)	
2016	YumeIro Cast	Julliard Hugo	
2016	Zhǔ Pú Project	Gilbert	
2017	18 Yume Sekai VR	Diver	
2017	Akane sasu sekai de kimi to utau	Katsura Kogorō	
2017	Another Eden	Gariyu	
2017	Attack on Titan Chain Puzzle Fever	Reiner Braun	
2017	Attack on Titan: Escape from Certain Death	Reiner Braun	
2017	Bungo Stray Dogs Mayoi Inu Kaikitan	Kunikida Doppo	
2017	Black Wolves Saga ~Weiβ und Schwarz~	Julian Von Garibaldi	
2017	Danmachi Cross Historia	Welf Crozzo	
2017	Danmachi ~ Memoria Furēze	Welf Crozzo	
2017	Fire Emblem Heroes	Gimle/Grima, Marc/Morgan, Reflet/Robin, Shigure	
2017	Fire Emblem Warriors	Gimle/Grima, Reflet/Robin	
2017	Flame x Blaze	Baza	
2017	Graffiti Smash	Abel	
2017	Gunzei RPG Ao no Sokokushi	Chō Ryō	
2017	Gwent: The Witcher Card Game	Iorveth	
2017	Ikemen Sengoku: Toki o Kakeru Koi ~Arata Naru Deai~	Sanada Yukimura	
2017	Itadaki Street: Dragon Quest and Final Fantasy 30th Anniversary	Kukule	
2017	Kenka Banchō Otome: Kanzen Muketsu no My Honey	Kira Rintarou	
2017	Kurokishi to Shiro no Maou	Kurokishi (Grams)	
2017	Meiji Tokyo Renka ~Dance Party~	Iwasaki Tousuke	
2017	Sevens Story	Arnias	
2017	SIX SICKS	Sakuma Ryuya	
2017	Stand My Heroes	Saotome Ikuto	
2017	Super Robot Wars V	Saburō Katō	
2017	The Legend of Heroes: Trails of Cold Steel III	Gaius Worzel	
2017	The New Prince of Tennis – Rising Beat	Kuranosuke Shiraishi	
2017	Tsubasa Dream Team	Mark Owairan	
2017	Tsukino Paradise	Uzuki Arata	
2017	Tsukitomo. – TSUKIUTA. 12 Memories	Uzuki Arata	
2018	Akatsuki no Epic -Union Brave-	Lovan	
2018	Attack on Titan 2	Reiner Braun	
2018	Ayakashi Koi Mawari	Sakura-Ji	
2018	Brown Dust	Alec	
2018	Caligula Overdose	Tomoe Kotarou	
2018	Danmachi ~ Memoria Furēze	Reiner Braun	
2018	Dangerous Wedding – Saiaku no Shunkan, Saiai no Kimi Ni...	Yoshiie Naoharu	
2018	Dungeon × Cooking – Tondemo Skill de Isekai Hourou Meshi Exploratory RPG	Mukouda Tsuyoshi	
2018	Five Kingdom – Itsuwari no Oukoku	Do~ūbe	
2018	For Whom the Alchemist Exists	Reiner Braun	
2018	Granblue Fantasy	Belial	
2018	Hakyū Hoshin Engi ~ Senkai Chronicle ~	Ko Hiko	
2018	Kingdom Ran – Tenka Tōitsue no Michi	Ō Hon	
2018	Kyōtō Kotoba RPG Kotodaman	Yousai, Kin Tsutomu Fegōru, Harprometheus, Byakko	
2018	LayereD Stories	Mifune Ryuto	
2018	LibraryCross∞	Yamato	
2018	Meiji Tōkei Koi Togi ~ Himekara Date ~	Iwasaki Tousuke	
2018	My Hero One's Justice	Fumikage Tokoyami	
2018	Ordinal Strata	Rosso	
2018	Precatus no Tenbin	Albert Canning	
2018	Saiki Kusuo no Psi-nan Mosoboso! Psychic Battle	Kuboyasu Aren	
2018	Saint Seiya – Awakening	Black Pegasus, Libra Dohko	
2018	Sevens Story	Alentaran	
2018	Shin Megami Tensei: Liberation Dx2	Tsai Junyung	
2018	Super Smash Bros. Ultimate	Reflet/Robin	
2018	The Legend of Heroes: Trails of Cold Steel IV	Gaius Worzel	
2018	Warriors Orochi 4	Abe no Seimei	
2018	Yume-Kanshū – Mukanshu	Myoushu	
2019	Attack on Titan 2 -Final Battle-	Reiner Braun	
2019	Bustafellows	Shu	
2019	Crystal of Re:union	Hector	
2019	Danmachi Infinite Combate	Welf Crozzo	
2019	Dragalia Lost	Aslam	
2019	Fantasy Life Online	Gieg	
2019	Giga Sangokushi	Ryūbi	
2019	Hijinrui Gakuen Extraordinary Ones	Zero Six	
2019	Honkai Impact 3rd	Welt Yang	
2019	Hozuki no Reitetsu~Jigoku no Puzzle mo Kimi Shidai	Gon	
2019	Kenka Banchou Otome 2nd Rumble!!	Kira Rintarou	
2019	Kin'iro no Corda Octave	Serizawa Mutsumi	
2019	Kyōtō Kotoba RPG Kotodaman	Reiner Braun	
2019	LAST CLOUDIA	Brad Rose	
2019	Monogatari Series Puc Puc	Shichika Yasuri	
2019	Punishing: Gray Raven	Watanabe	
2019	Robotics;Notes DaSH	Subaru Hidaka	
2019	SD Gundam G Generation Cross Rays	Orga Itsuka	
2019	Sengoku BASARA Battle Party	Sanada Nobuyuki	
2019	Shingeki no Kyojin TACTICS	Reiner Braun	
2019	Song of Time	Shun	
2019	Star Ocean: Anamnesis	Henri	
2019	The Legend of Heroes: Trails of Cold Steel: Akatsuki no Kiseki online story RPG	Gaius Worzel	
2019	Tokyo Debunker	Yarigasaki Kai	
2019	White Cat Tennis	Shiraishi Kuranosuke	
2019	XROSS CHRONICLE	Haou	
2020	100 Sleeping Princes and the Kingdom of Dreams Bungo Stray Dogs Collaboration	Kunikida Doppo	
2020	Ace Archer	Yamata no Orochi	
2020	Arashi Oyobu Onnatachi – Kyūtei Ranbu -	Fukou	
2020	Atri: My Dear Moments	Nojima Ryūji	
2020	Fantasia Re:build	Takeru Kusanagi	
2020	Genei Ibun Roku#FE Encore	Yashiro Tsurugi	
2020	Granblue Fantasy Versus	Belial	
2020	Indivisible Yami Oharau Tamashītachi	Dhar	
2020	Kamen Rider: Memory of Heroez	Shotaro Hidari/ Kamen Rider Double/ CycloneJoker	
2020	King's Raid	Lucikiel	
2020	Masterwork Apocalypse Genesis	Ishana	
2020	My Hero: One's Justice 2	Fumikage Tokoyami	
2020	Phantasy Star Online 2 es	Hyper Night Parade	
2020	Rage of Bahamut	Belial	
2020	Sango Retsu Hasanretsu	Welf Crozzo	
2020	Shin Megami Tensei III: Nocturne HD Remaster	Futomimi	
2020	Show by Rock!! Fes A Live	Rom	
2020	Sōsakuōen App *exe2045	S1=Ro6 Rom	
2020	Super Robot Wars DD	X-eins	
2020	The Legend of Heroes: Trails into Reverie	Gaius Worzel	
2020	Yīnyáng Shī: Bǎiwén Pái (Hyakki Ibunroku: Yokai Card Battle)	Qīng Fāngzhǔ (Aobouzu)	
2021	Bakumatsu Ishin Amasakeru Koi	Tokugawa Yoshinobu	
2021	Danmachi ~ Memoria Furēze	Kojou Akatsuki	
2021	Demon Slayer: Kimetsu no Yaiba – The Hinokami Chronicles	Kaigaku	
2021	Final Fantasy VII Remake Intergrade	Sonon Kusakabe	
2021	Hortensia Saga R	Protagonist	
2021	Identity V	Peter Ratri	
2021	Kingdom DASH!!	Ō Hon	
2021	Kyōtō Kotoba RPG Kotodaman	No Sound	
2021	La Corda d'Oro: Starlight Orchestra	Shinomori Kazuma	
2021	Light and Night	Charlie Su	
2021	Lord of Heroes	Aslan	
2021	Monster Hunter Riders	Isai	
2021	Monster Hunter Rise: Sunbreak	Hibasa	
2021	Monster Strike	Basara	
2021	My Hero Academia: Ultra Impact	Fumikage Tokoyami	
2021	My Next Life as a Villainess: All Routes Lead to Doom! The Pirate Known as "Trouble"	Ryle Werder	
2021	Panilla the Revival	Oliver	
2021	Seven Knights 2	Scott	
2021	Shadowverse	Drache	
2021	Shining Nikki	Sora	
2021	Shuuen no Virche ErroR:salvation	Scien Brofiise	
2021	Soul 7: Tora Continent	Senjin Mohaku	
2021	Super Robot Wars 30	Orga Itsuka	
2021	Tokei Shikake no Apocalypse	Liam Jebram	
2021	Touken Ranbu	Fukushima Mitsutada	
2021	Yo-kai Watch: Wibble Wobble	Reiner Braun	
2021	VR Kareshi	Honami Akito	
2021	Yu-Gi-Oh! Duel Links	IV, Reiji Akaba	
2022	Counter:Side	Gotou Toshinori	
2022	Echocalypse – Hikō no Kamiyaku	Protagonist	
2022	Identity V	Kunikida Doppo	
2022	Kirameki Paradise	Sumi	
2022	Kyōtō Kotoba RPG Kotodaman	Setristam, Seidaikoku, Mamoru, Genjirō Tanigaki	
2022	Lord of Heroes	Asuran Dakeon no Kunshu	
2022	Mobile Suit Gundam: Iron-Blooded Orphans Urðr Hunt	Orga Itsuka	
2022	Princess Arthur	Mordred	
2022	Puzzle & Dragons	Ō Hon	
2022	Reversal Othellonia	Muramasa	
2022	Shokumonogatari	Chigen	
2022	Sin Chronicle	Carval	
2022	Super Robot Wars 30 DLC	Hayato Jin	
2023	Arknights	Hoederer	
2023	Bustafellows Season 2	Shu	
2023	Fire Emblem Engage	Reflet/Robin	
2023	Gran Saga	Ignox	
2023	Honkai: Star Rail	Welt Yang	
2023	Kyōtō Kotoba RPG Kotodaman	Doppo Kunikida, Tsumerukiōru	
2023	Langrisser Mobile	Gunn	
2023	Mawaranu Hoshi no Stellarium	Clan Seva	
2023	Seven Knights 2	Scott	
2023	Shuuen no Virche EpiC:lycoris	Scien Brofiise	
2023	THE CHASER	Lobelia	
2023	Wizardry Variants Daphne	Vernant	
2024	Crayon Shin-Chan: Sumi no Machi no Shiro	Semashi Nohara	
2024	Duet Night Abyss	Yuming	
2024	Final Fantasy VII Rebirth	Sonon Kusakabe	
2024	Granblue Fantasy Versus: Rising	Belial	
2024	Like a Dragon: Infinite Wealth	Naoto Tagashira	
2024	Metaphor: ReFantazio	Basilio Lupus Magnus	
2024	Pokémon Masters EX	Volo	
2026	Onimusha: Way of the Sword	Miyamoto Musashi	
TBA	Alchemy Stars	TBA	
TBA	Star Smash	TBA	

=== Audio drama ===
Year	Series	Role	Notes
2010	Re: Baka wa Sekai o Sukueru ka?	Sato Koichi	
2010	Rikei Danshi. Bokura no Bunkasai	Natori Oshio	
2010	Towazugatari Original Drama CD	Shichika	
2011	Alice in Wonderland	White Rabbit	
2011	Hell's Kitchen Drama CD	Morisaki You	
2011	Hell's Kitchen Vol. 5 Drama CD	Morisaki You	
2011	Perabu！ a cappella love!? Drama CD #1	Katagiri Hayato	
2011	Perabu！ a cappella love!? Drama CD ♭1 ~ Natsufuku Side Story ~	Katagiri Hayato	
2012	BLACK WOLVES SAGA -Bloody Nightmare- Song collection「Dear Despair」 mini drama	Julian Von Garibaldi	
2012	Koetama	Sakaki Tomohiro	
2012	Kuroko no Basuke Character Song SOLO SERIES Vol.6	Hyūga Junpei	
2012	Kuroko no Basuke DRAMA THEATER 1st GAMES	Hyūga Junpei	
2012	Kuroko no Basuke Vol. 16 Drama CD	Hyūga Junpei	
2012	Magnolia	Yugo Wolf	
2012	Rikei Danshi. NEXT" Benkyo ni Naru!? Character Song Vol.2 Monologue drama	Natori Oshio	
2012	Shinsenkumi mokuhi-roku wasurenagusa Vol.5	Hijikata Toshizō	
2012	Sto☆Mani ~Strobe☆Mania~ Drama CD – Fuyu no Gochiso Scramble	Kagura Jin	
2012	Trinity Seven	Kasuga Arata	
2013	A Town Where You Live	Haruto Kirishima	
2013	Fire Emblem: Awakening Drama CD Vol. 1 – A Volatile Ylissean Romance	Marc, Reflet	
2013	Kamigami no Asobi drama CD	Loki Laevatein	
2013	Kuroko no Basuke Character Song DUET SERIES Vol.5 – Mini Drama ～Hyūga & Kiyoshi～	Hyūga Junpei	
2013	Kuroko no Basuke Vol. 23 Drama CD	Hyūga Junpei	
2013	Nade na de CD vol. 1 Senpai ga yoshi yoshi	Hīragi Senpai	
2013	Ōkami Shōjo to Kuro Ōji Vol. 6 Drama CD	Takeru Hibiya	
2013	Rikei Danshi. NEXT – Bokura no Rikaken	Natori Oshio	
2013	Shōnen Maid Vol. 6 Drama CD	Shinozaki Keiichirō	
2013	Tsukiuta. Drama!	Uzuki Arata	
2013	Tsukiuta. Drama! Sono 2	Uzuki Arata	
2013	Tsukiuta. – Sakura to Tomo ni Kimi dake wo. – OP mini drama, ED mini drama	Uzuki Arata	
2014	Fire Emblem: Awakening Drama CD Vol.4 – Search for the Dreaming Tiara	Marc, Reflet	
2014	Free! -Eternal Summer – Drama CD Iwatobi Channel ES Vol.2	Yamazaki Sōsuke	
2014	Free! -Eternal Summer – Drama CD Iwatobi, Samegara Suiei-Bu Godo Katsudo Nisshi 1	Yamazaki Sōsuke	
2014	Free! -Eternal Summer – Drama CD Iwatobi, Samegara Suiei-Bu Godo Katsudo Nisshi 2	Yamazaki Sōsuke	
2014	Ginga aidoru chō kareshi 08. Kaiōsei no kikyō	Kikyo	
2014	Haikyuu!! Vol.9 Drama CD – What if Karasuno's manager wasn't Kiyoko-san?	Azumane Asahi	
2014	Kuroko no Basuke DRAMA THEATER 3rd GAMES	Hyūga Junpei	
2014	Moshi kare vol. 1 ~ Moshimo anata no nichijō ni iyashikei kareshi ga purasu sa retara ~	Shinozawa Makoto	
2014	Ōkami Shōjo to Kuro Ōji Vol. 10 Drama CD	Takeru Hibiya	
2014	Taiyō no Ie	Daiki Nakamura	
2014	Tsukiuta. Artbook Bonus CD	Uzuki Arata	
2014	Tsukiuta. Radio! Sokkyou Butai-Hen – Meisaku Akazukin?	Uzuki Arata	
2014	Tsukiuta. – Rainy Day mini drama	Uzuki Arata	
2014	Tsukiuta. – Tsuki to, Hoshi to, Maboroshi to mini drama	Uzuki Arata	
2014	Zettai ni kudoka rete wa ikenai shitsuji 24-ji	Tōmine Kyōichi	
2015	100 Sleeping Princes and the Kingdom of Dreams -Sunoufiria no natsuyasumi	Graysia	
2015	Ace of Diamond Character Song Series Vol.7 Original drama ~ Yūkii & Isashiki & Tanba ~	Tetsuya Yūki	
2015	Bungou Stray Dogs Original Drama CD: Somewhat Extraordinary Days	Kunikida Doppo	
2015	FlyME project『DRINK ME』	Yunagi	
2015	I DOLL U Character Solo Song Series Moroboshi Seiya – Situation drama	Moroboshi Seiya	
2015	Inspector Shinya Kogami Vol. 2 Limited edition Drama CD	Yoshitoshi Waku	
2015	Kedamono Kareshi Margaret No. 11 special supplement drama CD	Kuroda	
2015	Kuroko no Basuke Vol. 30 Drama CD – "This Is the Story of Our Part-Time Jobs"	Hyūga Junpei	
2015	Love on Ride ~ tsūkin kareshi Vol. 1	Enzaki Yukihito	
2015	Momoiro Meroikku	Shinomiya Yamato	
2015	Makura no Danshi drama CD	Hanamine Kanade	
2015	Sakura no Hana no Koucha Ouji (Koucha Ouji spin off)	Assam	
2015	Star-Myu: ☆☆Eien★STAGE☆☆	Kakeru Tengenji	
2015	Tsukiuta. Drama! Sono 5	Uzuki Arata	
2015	Tsukiuta. – GRAVITY! – Mini-drama "Go for it! (Gravi ver)	Uzuki Arata	
2015	Tsukiuta. – Kimi, Mai Oriru – Mini-drama (Uduki Arata & Haduki You) – "New life"	Uzuki Arata	
2015	Watashi ga Motete Dōsunda Vol.5 Drama CD'	Igarashi Yūsuke	
2015	Watashi ga Motete Dōsunda Vol.7 Drama CD	Igarashi Yūsuke	
2016	All Out!! Vol.1 Special Package Edition Drama CD	Sekizen Takuya	
2016	All Out!! Vol.8 Special Package Edition Drama CD	Sekizen Takuya	
2016	Bungou Stray Dogs character mini album sonoichi	Kunikida Doppo	
2016	Danganronpa 3: The End of Kibougamine Gakuen Animate Bonus Drama CD	Kazuichi Soda	
2016	Drama CD mo fu dora ~ kotō ya mo fu jiken-hen ~	Suō Arata	
2016	Ensemble Stars! Vol.8 "Trickstar" short drama	Hokuto Hidaka	
2016	Haikyu!! Second Season Special Drama CD – Karasuno Koukou no Imonikai	Azumane Asahi	
2016	High Speed! – Free! Starting Days – Iwatobi junior high school swimming club activities diary	Yamazaki Sōsuke	
2016	I DOLL U -Complete Music Disc- Original audio drama	Moroboshi Seiya	
2016	Ikemen Sengoku: Toki o Kakeru Koi Character Song & Drama CD 3	Sanada Yukimura	
2016	Joker Game Drama CD 2 – Metropolitan Police Department・Special Investigation Cases D Section	Odagiri	
2016	Joker Game Drama CD 3 "Go For It! Year 2 Class D Sakuma-Sensei"	Odagiri	
2016	Kamigami no Asobi InFinite Character duet – Kaigō-roku Balder & Loki	Loki Laevatein	
2016	Mo fu doru Vol. 5 Suō Arata	Suō Arata	
2016	Oumagatoki ~Kakuriyo no Enishi~ Limited Edition Drama CD	Hayate	
2016	Star-Myu: Second STAGE	Kakeru Tengenji	
2016	Tanaka-kun Is Always Listless Drama CD Volume 1	Ohta	
2016	Tanaka-kun Is Always Listless 1 Special limited edition – Tanaka no baai	Ohta	
2016	Tanaka-kun Is Always Listless 5 Special limited edition – Rino no baai	Ohta	
2016	Tanaka-kun Is Always Listless 7 Special limited edition – Ōta no baai	Ohta	
2016	Tsukiuta. – Ikebukuro Tsukineko Monogatari	Uzuki Arata	
2016	Tsukiuta. – Six Gravity best album 「Kurotsuki」	Uzuki Arata	
2017	100 Sleeping Princes & The Kingdom of Dreams sound 100 series~ Vol.4 -Yuki futta nochi ni	Graysia	
2017	All Out!! Drama CD Oretachi no yume onosete	Sekizen Takuya	
2017	Gekijōban Meiji Tokyo Renka Meiji Romanesque Records 2- monologue drama	Tōsuke Iwasaki	
2017	Iruka no hoshi Planet of Dolphins Drama CD	Narrator	
2017	Joker Game Drama CD – 2nd Year D-Class, Sakuma-sensei Returns!!	Odagiri	
2017	Joker Game Drama CD "A Parody Box Full of "What Ifs"	Odagiri	
2017	Kenka Banchō Otome: Shitsuji no Chōten o Kiwameshi Mono	Kira Rintarou	
2017	Mobile Suit Gundam: Iron-Blooded Orphans Drama CD I	Orga Itsuka	
2017	Mobile Suit Gundam: Iron-Blooded Orphans Drama CD II	Orga Itsuka	
2017	Requiem of the Rose King Vol. 7 Drama CD	Catesby	
2017	Star-Myu: Third STAGE	Kakeru Tengenji	
2018	100 Sleeping Princes & The Kingdom of Dreams Collaboration Earphone	Graysia	
2018	Attack on Titan 3 Vol.1 Drama CD – High School Caste AU	Reiner Braun	
2018	Campfire Cooking in Another World with My Absurd Skill Vol.5 Drama CD	Mukouda Tsuyoshi	
2018	Devils' Line Vol. 11 Limited Edition Drama CD	Sawasaki Takashi	
2018	Free! – Dive to the Future – Drama CD Extra Short Films	Yamazaki Sōsuke	
2018	Gokujyo Voice Method One – Kirawareru Yūki	Young man	
2018	Grimgar of Fantasy and Ash level.13 Drama CD – Yukite Kaerishi Chi no Enigma	Haruhiro	
2018	Maid Sama! Special Edition – Marriage Drama CD	Ryūnosuke Kurosaki	
2018	Phantasy Star Online 2 Drama CD 4 – Sierra's report	Yasaka Enga	
2018	Teiden Shojo to Hamushi no Orchestra Mikansei no, on.	Sōta	
2019	Chihayafuru Vol.43 Special Edition	Wataya Arata	
2019	Devils' Line Vol. 14 Limited Edition Drama CD	Sawasaki Takashi	
2019	Fate/Prototype: Fragments of Sky Silver Drama CD	Lucius Tiberius	
2019	Gekijōban Meiji Tokyo Renka Ending Theme Collection – Mini Drama	Tōsuke Iwasaki	
2019	Gekijōban Meiji Tokyo Renka Tsukiakari no Rhapsodia – Mini Drama	Tōsuke Iwasaki	
2019	Higyaku no Noel SEASON 0 ~Hangyaku~	Russell Burrows	
2019	Robotics;Notes DaSH Original Drama CD – Yume no Arubasho	Subaru Hidaka	
2019	Sarazanmai Vol.5 Bonus Drama CD	Mabu Akutsu	
2019	Sarazanmai Vol.6 Bonus Drama CD	Mabu Akutsu	
2019	Seirou Opera Chapter 47 appendix drama CD – Betsucomi October 2019	Oumiya Sousuke	
2019	Shinkansen Henkei Robo Shinkalion THE ANIMATION Blu-ray BOX4 – Drama CD	Byakko	
2019	Star-Myu: Fourth STAGE	Kakeru Tengenji	
2019	The Prince of Tennis Vol. 27 Drama CD	Kuranosuke Shiraishi	
2019	Tsukiuta. – Reincarnation – Aoi-kun, jiken desu, Tatta hitotsu no ani toshite	Uzuki Arata	
2019	Tsukiuta. – Story of Colors – Fuyu: mada tooi haru, Haru: sakurabito, sakihokoru	Uzuki Arata	
2020	Campfire Cooking in Another World with My Absurd Skill Vol.8 Drama CD	Mukouda Tsuyoshi	
2020	Fire Emblem Extra Drama CD – Awakening: Waking Darkness; Undying Hope	Reflet	
2020	Haikyu!! TO THE TOP Special Drama CD – Tokyo Meiro Kouryakusen	Azumane Asahi	
2020	Mairimashita, Senpai Drama CD	Mizukawa	
2020	Seirou Opera Vol. 12 Limited Special Edition Box Drama CD	Oumiya Sousuke	
2020	Sōshi Sōai Drama CD	Wakamatsu Soji	
2020	The Yakuza's Guide to Babysitting Vol.3 Special Box Edition Drama CD	Tōru Kirishima	
2020	Tsukiuta. Drama CD series Tsukiuta Kitan Yumemigusa" Volume 1 – Yumegatari Sakura	Uzuki Arata	
2021	Meiji Tokyo Renka 10th Anniversary Album – Monologue Drama	Tōsuke Iwasaki	
2021	Ou no Kemono Drama CD	Ekai	
2021	Star-Myu: Fifth STAGE	Kakeru Tengenji	
2021	Yoasobi – Yoru ni Kakeru Drama CD	Senpai	
2022	"Free! -the Final Stroke" Character Song Single Vol.9 Timeless Blue – Relay of Youth	Yamazaki Sōsuke	
2023	BATTLE OF TOKYO TIME 4 Jr.EXILE	Skeet	
2023	Makyogai	Toyama Shin	
2023	Rōdoku Kissa Hanashi no Kago ~ Arasujidekiku Bungaku Zenshū – Sherlock Holmes: Akagekumiai	Narrator	
2023	Tsukiuta. Character CD – 5th Season 5	Uzuki Arata	

=== Vomic ===
Year	Series	Role	Notes
2008	Akuma de Sōrō VOMIC	Yamamoto Jun'ichi	
2008	Badogāru! VOMIC	Takaoka Taiyō	
2012	Kekkai Sensen VOMIC	Zapp Renfro	
2013	Kono Oto Tomare! VOMIC	Takaoka Tetsuki	
2013	Shin Kōtai Monogatari web comic	Ushijima Hajime	
2014	The Tenth Prism	Yui Sanseru	
2016	Kirin – Plasma Nyūsankin	Sensei, pDC	
2017	Nando datte, suki.〜 Kokuhaku jikkō iinkai 〜	Ken Shibazaki	
2019	Albert Ke no Reijou wa Botsuraku wo go Shomou desu	Addie	
2021	Monsters	Shimotsuki Ryuma	
2022	Heika, Kokoro no Koe ga Dadamore desu!	Gaizel	
2022	Koi wa Ankoku	Korai Sosei	
2023	Shujinkou Nikki	Mizusawa Sena	
2024	Taisho Shinkon Roman – Gunjin-sama wa Ubu na Tsuma wo Shuuchaku Junai de Someagetai	Yukisada Yukitei	

=== Narration ===
Year	Title	Notes
2015	Meisaku × irasuto × seiyū – Miryoku Afureru Kiseki no Koraborēshon!	
2015	NEWS ZERO – Nyūgano Norikoe, Kanaetanegai	
2015	Real TV ZERO Special Edition – Cancer gift gantte, Fukōdesu ka?'	
2016	Konica Minolta Planetarium Theaters – Iruka no hoshi (Planet of Dolphins)	
2016	Shin sedai ga hodoku! Nippon no Jirenma 'Disrupt Tenanida?'	
2017	Hakunetsu oozumou! Tsuyo-sa o Umuaibaru to Manga	
2017	NHK Kōkōkoza Kokugo Sōgō 'Gojuppohyappo'	
2017	NHK Kōkōkoza Kokugo Sōgō 'Ujishūimonogatari-Ji no Sora ne'	
2017	NHK News Ohayō Nippon – Asa Gohan no Genba	
2017	Shin sedai ga Hodoku! Nippon no dilemma 'Shiseikan no dilemma ~ Ima, Shinu to iu Koto.~'	
2017	Shin sedai ga Hodoku! Nippon no dilemma 'Orinpikku Pararinpikku no dilemma'	
2017	Shin sedai ga Hodoku! Nippon no dilemma 'Hatarakitai no ni Hatarakenai Jakunen Mugyō no dilemma'	
2018	Adobe Tanki Shūchū Zemi' – Yo Shimizu	
2018	Asurīto no Tamashī – "Zenryoku" to "Hodohodo" no ma de Badminton Okuhara Kibō	
2018	Kinkyū Kenshō! Gaiden gen'yō kokka Soren no Shinjitsu ~ Harashō Chōjō Shiberia Tetsudō no Yoru	
2018	Konica Minolta Planetaria Tokyo – Hoshisora An'nai 【Fuyu】	
2018	Life is......~ Jinsei o Irodoru Kōfuku no Essence ~ – Yoh Shomei	
2018	Maquia: When the Promised Flower Blooms – Special Limited Edition (Production Making)	
2018	NHK Kōkōkoza Kokugo Sōgō 'Gojuppohyappo'	
2018	NHK Kōkōkoza Kokugo Sōgō 'Hirayamonogatari Kiso no Saigo'(1)-(2)	
2018	NHK Kōkōkoza Kokugo Sōgō 'Ka Torai'	
2018	NHK Kōkōkoza Kokugo Sōgō 'Okinawa no Shukikara'(1)-(4)	
2018	NHK Kōkōkoza Kokugo Sōgō 'Okinawa no Shukikara'(1)-(5)	
2018	NHK Kōkōkoza Kokugo Sōgō 'Rongo Ningen o Mitsumeru'	
2018	NHK Kōkōkoza Kokugo Sōgō 'Rongo Seiji o Kangaeru'	
2018	NHK Kōkōkoza Kokugo Sōgō 'Ujishūimonogatari Ji no Sorane'(1)-(2)	
2018	【Saiai no Hito】 Hosoya Yoshimasa × Yomiuri Shimbun Column 'Henshū Techō' Rōdoku	
2018	Seitan 110-nen Higashiyama Kaii-ten Retrospective 1908–1999	
2018	Shiawase! Mofumofu Pet	
2018	Shin sedai ga Hodoku! Nippon no dilemma Ganjitsu SP "Konkyo Naki Fuan" o Koete'	
2018	Shin sedai ga Hodoku! Nippon no dilemma – '"Konkyo Naki Fuan" o Koete Hankyōhen'	
2018	Shin sedai ga Hodoku! Nippon no dilemma – 'Oya to Ko no Dilemma Daikenkyū'	
2019	2019 FIVB Volleyball Men's World Cup	
2019	Jinrō Battle lies and the truth 2019 FEBRUARY～Jinrō VS Kaizoku～	
2019	Konica Minolta Planetaria Tokyo – Hoshisora An'nai 【Haru】	
2019	Konica Minolta Planetaria Tokyo – Hoshisora An'nai 【Natsu】	
2019	Konica Minolta Planetaria Tokyo – Hoshisora An'nai 【Aki】	
2019	NHK Kōkōkoza Kokugo Sōgō 'Gabisangetsuka'	
2019	NHK Kōkōkoza Kokugo Sōgō 'Gojuppohyappo'	
2019	NHK Kōkōkoza Kokugo Sōgō 'Haruyajiu'	
2019	NHK Kōkōkoza Kokugo Sōgō 'Hirayamonogatari Kiso no Saigo'(1)-(3)	
2019	NHK Kōkōkoza Kokugo Sōgō 'Ka Torai'	
2019	NHK Kōkōkoza Kokugo Sōgō 'Kobun ni Shitashimu'	
2019	NHK Kōkōkoza Kokugo Sōgō 'Rongo Manabu to Iukoto'	
2019	NHK Kōkōkoza Kokugo Sōgō 'Rongo Ningen o Mitsumeru'	
2019	NHK Kōkōkoza Kokugo Sōgō 'Okinawa no Shukikara'(3)-(5)	
2019	NHK Kōkōkoza Kokugo Sōgō 'Rongo Seiji o Kangaeru'	
2019	NHK Kōkōkoza Kokugo Sōgō 'Ryōshūshi'	
2019	NHK Kōkōkoza Kokugo Sōgō Shungyō'	
2019	NHK Kōkōkoza Kokugo Sōgō 'Ujishūimonogatari Ji no Sorane'(1)-(2)	
2019	Shingeki no Kyojin-ten FINAL	
2019	Trip Setomachi ~Kimi to Aruku Seto Monogatari~	
2020	1945 Hiroshima Timeline	
2020	Achikochi no Suzu-san	
2020	ARTIZON MUSEUM – Emerging Artscape	
2020	Bungo Stray Dogs Dai Hakurankai	
2020	Drain the Oceans 2 Episode 11-15	
2020	Kyōto Gionmatsuri – Machishū no Jōnetsu Yamaboko no Fūryū —'	
2020	Reiwa no Heiwa Song from Hiroshima	
2020	The Time Shock 2020 Saikyō Quiz Ketteisen SP	
2021	Ano Tokio Shuzai-chū	
2021	ARTIZON MUSEUM – Steps Ahead	
2021	ARTIZON MUSEUM – The Impressionists: Tales of Painterly Friendships	
2021	Corona Wazawai demo Tsuyokunareru	
2021	Konica Minolta Planetaria – Natsu no Seiza An'nai	
2021	Peaslide Journey Hiroshima City	
2021	The Time Shock 2021 Saikyō Quiz Ketteisen SP	
2022	Ano Tokio Shuzai-chū – Round Chūgoku	
2022	ARTIZON MUSEUM – Hajimarikara, Ima. 1952–2022	
2022	Heiwakinen Kōen Resthouse	
2022	Hiroshima-shi Kyōdoshiryōkan	
2022	Konica Minolta Planetaria – Haru no Seiza An'nai	
2022	Kono Sora ne	
2022	National Geographic – Predator: Chi no Keishō	
2022	Otoginokuni de Oyasuminasai	
2022	Sōgō Nagano Keniki – Dodododo Yakanbu Higuchi Ai Samishisa no Sakini	
2022	Sora ni Kakeru ~Hoshi no Kyorio motomete ~	
2022	The Time Shock 2022 Cho High Level Quiz Ketteisen SP	
2022	The Time Shock 2022 Saikyō Quiz Ketteisen SP	
2022	Tokubetsu-ten Alice – Hendekorin, Hendekorin na Sekai	
2022	Visual Kei Shugi NIGHTMARE	
2023	Ano Hon, Yomimashita?	
2023	ARTIZON MUSEUM – Art Tanoshimu – Miru, Kanjiru, Manabu	
2023	ARTIZON MUSEUM – ABSTRACTION	
2023	ARTIZON MUSEUM – Marie Laurencin: An Eye for Her Time	
2023	Egypt ni Nemuruzaihō 4 Pyramid: Aratana – Kigen no Kanōsei	
2023	NHK Heart-ten	
2023	Okayama×-san in special Ano Tokio Shuzai-chū 'Okayama × Shimane	
2023	San in special ×Y supe! Ano Tokio Shuzai-chū 'Tottori × Yamaguchi'	
2023	Seitan 120-nen Munakata Shikō-ten Making of Munakata	
2023	Solo Sauna Tune 3rd Anniversary	
2024	ARTIZON MUSEUM – Brancusi: Carving the Essence	
2024	Okayama & Sanin Special Ano Toki Shuzai-chū Tottori & Okayama	
2024	Shigatsu ni Nareba Kanojo wa	

=== Voice over & TVCM ===
Year	Title	Role	Notes
2013	Aventurier – Shinyaku Arsène Lupin motion comic	Arsène Lupin	
2013	Terra Formars special PV	Narrator	
2015	Grendizer Giga PV	Duke Fleed	
2015	MOS Burger	Narrator	
2015	Rabukome no Baka PV	Hasegawa Osamu	
2015	Tan sansu ibu PV	Taki Shintarō	
2016	Derby Impact	Narrator	
2016	Seirō Opera PV	Oumiya Sousuke	
2017	Blue Hearts ga Kikoeru	Narrator	
2017	Bourbon Excellent Sweets	Narrator	
2018	Kracie Hadabisei	Narrator	
2019	Bijoupiko Marriage Ring	Groom	
2019	Cheese in the Trap	Aota Jun	
2019	Dai 31-kai Fantasia Taishō Jushō-Saku	Narrator	
2019	Mouseman PV	Mouseman	
2019	The Way of the Househusband 4th PV	Torajiro	
2019	The Yakuza's Guide to Babysitting Commemorative Video	Tōru Kirishima	
2019	The Yakuza's Guide to Babysitting 2nd PV	Tōru Kirishima	
2019	Type:YOU [R]	Narrator	
2020	Shokubutsu Sentai Botanical Force	Souhei Okunomori	
2021	Asahi The Lemon Craft	Tsundere Chijuugai Lemon	
2021	Shingeki no Kyojin × uno	Reiner Braun	
2021	SINKO Innovative Manufacturing of AHU	Narrator	
2021	Soshite, Baton wa Watasareta	Narrator	
2021	When Will Ayumu Make His Move?	Ayumu Tanaka	
2022	Alinamin × Shingeki no Kyojin	Reiner Braun	
2022	Heika, Kokoro no Koe ga Dadamore desu!	Gaizel	
2022	HOT PEPPER Beauty	Self	
2022	Koi wa Ankoku	Korai Sosei	
2022	MegaHobby Expo 2022	Narrator	
2022	My Happy Marriage PV	Narrator	
2022	Tokyo Aliens	Narrator	
2023	Hearst Fujingaho – Haikei 118-nen mae no Kunikida Doppo-sama	Narrator	
2023	Kyō, Watashi no Monogatari ga Hashirimasu.	University student	
2023	Lark Japan	Narrator	
2023	MARO17 – Utakata feat.TETSU hen	Yakumo Tetsu	
2023	Murakumo: Ghost Agency PV	Narrator	
2023	Saigo no Nankanni, Nozome	Narrator	
2023	The Boogeyman PV	Narrator	
2023	Yomi no Tsugai PV	Narrator	
2024	Koroshiya no Oshi	Endo Owal, Fujiyama Kumichō	
2024	The First Omen	Narrator	

=== Recitation & Theater ===
Year	Title	Notes
2017	LOVE LETTERS ~ Aoi Yōji Tsuitō Kōen ~	
2019	Koi Oyomu – Boku wa Asu, Kinou no Kimi to Date suru	
2019	Koi Oyomu – Nigeru wa Haji da ga Yaku ni Tatsu	
2019	Nihoshi × Koe	
2019	Tōkaidōyotsuyakaidan Gaiden・Uso	
2020	Hoshokai – Yanō Tokubetsu Kōen 〜 Yogatari no Kai 〜	
2020	Kanata 10 Shūnenkinen Kōen 『Abuna e, Abuna Koe 〜Sai〜』	
2020	VOICARION – Joō ga Ita Kyakushitsu	
2021	Cello Hiki no Gauche	
2021	Hoshifuruyoru wa Konookade ~ Yozoraniukabu Kamui-tachi no Monogatari ~	
2021	Koi Oyomu in Clie – Nigeru wa Haji da ga Yaku ni Tatsu	
2021	Reading Museum Part 2 "Ikebukuro Sherlock, Saisho de Saigo no Jiken"	
2021	Seiyuu Kakukatariki	
2021	Yanōh Kataribu-tachi no Yoru "Kiyotsune"	
2022	7minutes Reading	
2022	Kanata presents Triangle 『Ivy』	
2022	Koekabu Rōdoku de Tanoshimu Kabuki	
2022	Rōdokugeki THE CLASSIC	
2022	Sekai kara Neko ga Kieta nara	
2022	Yozora ni Ukabu Kamui-tachi no Monogatari	
2023	Harvey	
2023	Kurama Tengu	
2023	Mixa × Murder Mystery	
2023	Reading High – Base Metal	
2023	Rubin no Tsubo ga Wareta	
2023	The Sign of the Four	
2024	Staging!! Vol.1 – Shigatsugatsu Jūichinichiosen ni Hyakukai Kurikaeshita to Shuchōsuru Otoko	
2024	TASTE OF SOUND WAVE Reading with Live music Sherlock Holmes4	

=== Radio drama ===
Year	Series	Role	Notes
2012	Sentimental Vector picture drama "Strobe Lights"	Watase	
2013	Asahirubann biginingu	Ni Tomegawa Saburo <hiru>	
2021	Nakeru short story – Cookie	Protagonist	
2022	100 Man-kai Ikita Neko	Narrator	

=== Tokusatsu ===
Year	Series	Role	Notes
2010	Kamen Rider OOO	Ageha Yummy	Ep. 11-12
2022	Ultra Galaxy Fight: The Destined Crossroad	Ultraman Leo	
2023	Ultraman Regulos	Ultraman Leo	

=== Live action ===
Year	Series	Role	Notes
2011	Kami Voice ~THE VOICE MAKES A MIRACLE~	Announcer	

=== Dubbing ===
==== Live-action ====
Voice dub for	Title	Role	Notes
Alden Ehrenreich	Brave New World	John the Savage	
Andrew Garfield	Lions for Lambs	Todd Hayes	
Ansel Elgort	Carrie	Tommy Ross	
Ansel Elgort	Divergent	Caleb Prior	
Ansel Elgort	The Divergent Series: Insurgent	Caleb Prior	
Ansel Elgort	The Divergent Series: Allegiant	Caleb Prior	
Ansel Elgort	The Goldfinch	Theodore "Theo" Decker	
Anthony Padilla	Smosh: The Movie	Anthony	
Bee Vang	Gran Torino	Thao Vang Lor	
Ben Barnes	Seventh Son	Tom Ward	
Ben Barnes	Stardust	Young Dunstan Thorn	
Billy Howle	The Serpent	Herman Knippenberg	
Billy Howle	The Witness for the Prosecution	Leonard Vole	
Blair Redford	The Gifted	John Proudstar / Thunderbird	
Bradley James	Damien	Damien Thorn	
Chad Michael Murray	Gilmore Girls	Tristin Dugray	
Christian Hillborg	The Bridge	Daniel Ferbé	
Dave Franco	Now You See Me	Jack Wilder	
Dave Franco	Now You See Me 2	Jack Wilder	
Dave Franco	Now You See Me: Now You Don't	Jack Wilder	
Diego Cadavid	Yo soy Betty, la fea	Román	
Douglas Booth	Jupiter Ascending	Titus Abrasax	
Dustin Milligan	The Butterfly Effect 2	Trevor Eastman	
Ed Speleers	Outlander	Stephen Bonnet	
Eddie Redmayne	Hick	Eddie Kreezer	
Eddie Redmayne	The Yellow Handkerchief	Gordy	
Elijah Wood	The Trust	Sergeant David Waters	
Ezra Miller	Justice League	Barry Allen / The Flash	
Ezra Miller	Arrow	Barry Allen / The Flash	
Ezra Miller	Zack Snyder's Justice League	Barry Allen / The Flash	
Ezra Miller	Peacemaker	Barry Allen / The Flash	
Ezra Miller	The Flash	Barry Allen / The Flash	
Figaro Ceng	They Kiss Again	Yang Qi Tai	
Fu Meng-po	The Perilous Internet Ring	Ma Ming	
Gabriel Guevara	Culpa mía	Nick	
Gang Dong-won	Illang: The Wolf Brigade	Im Joong-kyung	
Harrison Gilbertson	In the Tall Grass	Travis McKean	
Himesh Patel	Station Eleven	Jeevan Chaudhary	
Ja Rule	Assault on Precinct 13	Smiley	
Jackson Rathbone	The Last Airbender	Sokka	
Jai Courtney	Terminator Genisys	Kyle Reese	
James McAvoy	It Chapter Two	Bill Denbrough	
Jason Wong	Alex Rider S3	Nile	
Jeong Jinwoon	Dream High 2	Jin Yoo-jin	
Jesse McCartney	The Suite Life of Zack & Cody	Jesse McCartney	
Joe Dempsie	Pieces of Her	Nick	
Jordan Francis	Camp Rock	Barron James	
Jordan Francis	Camp Rock 2: The Final Jam	Barron James	
John Robinson	Transformers	Miles Lancaster	
Josh Hutcherson	Journey 2: The Mysterious Island	Sean Anderson	
Josh O'Connor	Les Misérables	Marius Pontmercy	
Joshua Close	Thorne	Josh Ramsey	
Jung Yoon-hak	My Unfortunate Boyfriend	Kang Hee-chul	
Justin Bartha	The Rebound	Aram Finklestein	
Justin Chien	The Brothers Sun	Charles Sun	
Kim Jae-joong	Code Name: Jackal	Choi Hyun	
Kim Jae-joong	Triangle	Jang Dong-chul	
Luke Kleintank	FBI: International	Scott Forrester	
Max Thieriot	My Soul to Take	Adam 'Bug' Hellerman	
Miles Teller	Spiderhead	Jeff	
Pablo Santos	Shackles	Minnow	
Robert Maaser	Blood & Gold	Heinrich	
Ryan Guzman	The Boy Next Door	Noah Sandborn	
Sean Teale	Incorporated	Ben Larson/Aaron	
Shia LaBeouf	Eagle Eye	Jerry Shaw	
Shia LaBeouf	Indiana Jones and the Kingdom of the Crystal Skull	Henry "Mutt Williams" Jones III	
Simu Liu	Running Wild with Bear Grylls	Simu Liu	
Simu Liu	Shang-Chi and the Legend of the Ten Rings	Xu Shang-Chi / Shaun	
Simu Liu	Avengers: Doomsday	Xu Shang-Chi	
So Ji-sub	Doctor Lawyer	Han Yi-han	
Taylor Lautner	Abduction	Nathan Harper	
Taylor Lautner	Twilight	Jacob Black	
Taylor Lautner	The Twilight Saga: New Moon	Jacob Black	
Taylor Lautner	The Twilight Saga: Eclipse	Jacob Black	
Taylor Lautner	The Twilight Saga: Breaking Dawn – Part 1	Jacob Black	
Taylor Lautner	The Twilight Saga: Breaking Dawn – Part 2	Jacob Black	
Taylor Zakhar Perez	The Kissing Booth 2	Marco V. Peña	
Thomas Dekker	A Nightmare on Elm Street	Jesse Braun	
Tom Sturridge	The Sandman	Morpheus / Dream	
Woo Do-hwan	My Country: The New Age	Nam Sun-ho	
Yoson An	Mulan	Chen Honghui	
Zac Efron	The Lucky One	Logan Thibault	
Zac Efron	Mike and Dave Need Wedding Dates	David "Dave" Stangle	
Zach Gilford	Post Grad	Adam Davies	
Zackary Momoh	The Nevers	Doctor Horatio Cousens	
	Night of the Living Dead	Radio broadcaster	

==== Animation ====
Title	Role	Notes
Arjun and the Adventure of Ice Lotus	Duryodhan	
The Buzz on Maggie	Gym Shorts Kid	
Marvel Zombies	Xu Shang-Chi	
StoryBots: Answer Time	Socradamus	
Surf's Up 2: WaveMania	Cody Maverick	
Tinker Bell	Terence	
Tinker Bell and the Lost Treasure	Terence	
Tinker Bell and the Great Fairy Rescue	Terence	
Tinker Bell and the Pixie Hollow Games	Terence	
Tinker Bell and the Secret of the Wings	Terence	
Tomb Raider King	Seo Joo Heon	

== Radio and variety ==
Year	Program	Notes
2010.10.03 – 2013.12.29	ANI-TAMA-ZOO Safari	co-host with Chiaki Takahashi
2011.04.07 – 2011.09.29	Seiyū Varietyー SAY!YOU!SAY!ME!	co-host with Ryōko Nagoshi
2011.10.09 – 2013.03.31	Hosoya Yoshimasa・Masuda Toshiki No Zenryoku Danshi	co-host with Toshiki Masuda
2014.04.13 – 2020.09.27	Tensai Gunshi	co-host with Hiroki Yasumoto
2019.07.01 – present	Boku no Mizo Shiru Sekai	
2022.04.11 – 2023.03.23	Say You to Yo Asobi Season 5 – Thursday	co-host with Daisuke Namikawa
2022.06.24 – 2022.12.26	Golden Spirits	co-host with Takayuki Kondō
2022.07.17 – present	Koyoi, Mystery Cafe ni te	co-host with Takeharu Mikami

== Discography ==
=== Character song ===
Year	Release date	Album	Role	Track title	Identification No.	note
2007	November 9	Koi no Gekidasa Ecstasy!	Tachikiri Tai (Shiraishi Kuranosuke)	Koi no Gekidasa ECSTASY!	NECM-10084	Group
2007	November 21	The Best of Rival Players XXXI Kuranosuke Shiraishi	Shiraishi Kuranosuke	BIBLE	NECM-11046	
2009	April 15	prayer	Shiraishi Kuranosuke	prayer	NECM-10122	
2009	September 6	Dear Prince～Tenisunoōjisama-tachi e～	Shiraishi Kuranosuke	Dear Prince～Tenisunoōjisama-tachi e～	TYCT-0013	
2010	April 14	Medicine or ...?	Shiraishi Kuranosuke	Hajimari wa, Ecstacy go on Kabriel Hakusho; Song for you prayer -APRIL STYLE- EVER FREE; No Muda Life ~Ecstacy Samurai no Teema~; BIBLE 〜2010 STYLE〜 I.ng; Kaze no Sonnet ~Innocent Bright Green~; Home Sweet Home	NECA-30259	
2010	May 19	POISON	Shiraishi Kuranosuke	Doku no Hana; Kuchibiru like bored days Kaze no Yuuenchi; GET STARTED; CLASH!! Speed Star; Magic Mirror; SUNSHINE ON MY HEART; Epilogue; Ashiato	NECA-30260, NEZA-90001 ~ 2	
2010	July 22	Kaicho ha Maid Sama! Character Concept CD:04 -Another Side-	Ryūnosuke Kurosaki	Don't Cry VACA	GNCA-1264	Group
2011	August 10	Doku to kusuri	Shiraishi Kuranosuke	Hajimari wa, Ecstacy; Kuchibiru; EVER FREE; No Muda Life ~Ecstacy Samurai no Teema~; Magic Mirror; I.ng; GET STARTED; Song for you Kabriel Hakusho go on prayer CLASH!! Speed Star like bored days BIBLE; Epilogue; Ashiato	NECA-30273, NEZA-90001～2	
2011	August 31	Aozora STAGE	Tachikiri Tai (Shiraishi Kuranosuke)	Aozora STAGE	NECM-10158	Group
2011	September 21	TV ANIMATION NO.6 ORIGINAL SOUNDTRACK 1	Nezumi	Kaze no Requiem ~Mao no Tam~	SVWC-7790	
2011	September 22	Perabu！a cappella love!? Drama CD ♭1 ~ Natsufuku Side Story ~	Katagiri Hayato	Lil' Happy Days	FCCO-26	Group
2011	October 10	Brave heart	Teja Ore 300 (Shiraishi Kuranosuke)	Fantastic Bazar, Brave Heart, Tenniversary	NECM-13300	Group
2011	October 28	TV ANIMATION NO.6 ORIGINAL SOUNDTRACK 2	Nezumi	Buna no Mori de, Kirameku Mono Tachi	SVWC-7793	
2011	November 9	Iroa Senai Ano Sora e	STONES (Shiraishi Kuranosuke)	Iroa Senai Ano Sora e	NECM-10130	Group
2011	November 9	Valentine Kiss with Shitenhojichu	Shiraishi Kuranosuke	Valentine Kiss	NECM-10119	
2011	November 23	Sto☆Mani ~Strobe☆Mania~ 「Romance Chase」	Kagura Jin	Nazo = Ai, Nazo = Ai ～GAME OPENING version～	D3PR-0017	
2012	January 18	Chihayafuru Original Soundtrack & Character Song Album 1	Wataya Arata	Yume e no chizu	VPCG-84916	
2012	February 8	Shin Hyakka Seiran II – Dansei Seiyu Hen		Shin Hyakka Seiran – Hosoya Yoshimasa	ESCL-3812	
2012	May 23	Inu x Boku SS Volume 3 limited edition bonus CD ending song Vol.2	Rensho Sorinozuka	Taiyou to Tsuki	ANZX-6445	Duet (Yōko Hikasa)
2012	September 12	Custom Drive – Love☆Rocket Kyuu Sekkin!!	Mayuzumi Ruka	Love☆Rocket Kyuu Sekkin!!, Provocative	D3PR-0040	Duet (Ryōhei Kimura), (Toshiyuki Toyonaga)
2012	September 12	Kuroko no Basuke Character Song SOLO SERIES Vol.6	Hyūga Junpei	Clutch Time, Hanashi wo Shiyou	LACM-4976	
2012	October 24	Rikei Danshi. NEXT" Benkyo ni Naru!? Character Song Vol.2	Natori Oshio	Genkai experimentation, Rikei Danshi STEP Boku-ra no Kagaku Han'nō (Kizuna)	FFCO-0066	
2012	November 7	Ixion Saga DT OP Theme & ED	Pet	DT Suteru	PCCG-90086	
2012	November 21	Character Song Album Mitsugo no Akuma Hen	Ozo Furuya	feelin' high	TECI-1349	
2012	December 12	BLACK WOLVES SAGA CD kagiri naku tōmei ni chikai kuro (BLACK)	Julian Von Garibaldi	Kagirinaku tōmei ni chikai kuro (BLACK)		Duet (Kishō Taniyama)
2013	January 23	Momoyama Predator Hen	Ozo Furuya	HERMANOS	TECI-1352	
2013	February 27	DT IXION SAGA DT CHERRY BEST OF DT	Pet	Kemono no uta	PCCG-1334	
2013	March 27	Kuroko no Basuke Character Song DUET SERIES Vol.5	Hyūga Junpei	Arigatou no Kawarini, HERE WE GO,	LACM-4990	Duet (Kenji Hamada)
2013	April 5	Tsukiuta. – Sakura to Tomo ni Kimi dake wo.	Uzuki Arata	Sakura to Tomo ni Kimi dake wo., Sakusa-Sakura -Japanese modern Remix	TKUT-0009	
2013	July 24	Kimi no Iru Machi ED	Haruto Kirishima	Kimi no Iru Machi, Reasons	UMCA-50039	
2013	August 27	Kamigami no Asobi Character Song Series Balder & Loki	Loki Laevatein	Liar	QECB-54	
2013	October 23	Brothers Conflict character song mini album 2	Yusuke Asahina	Chōhatsu Machine☆Gun, Kiss&Cry	GNCA-1386	Duet (KENN)
2013	December 11	Kuroko no Basuke Seirin Mini Album	Hyūga Junpei	Challenger Spirit, Ano hi wasureta mirai made	LACA-15355	Duet (Kenji Hamada), (Chiwa Saitō)
2013	December 25	Kingdom Character Song Mini Album – Battle -	Ōhon	SHOUT OF VICTORY ~ Kachidoki~	AVCA-74034	
2014	February 5	Valentine Kiss Best	Shiraishi Kuranosuke	Valentine Kiss	NECA-30305～06	
2014	February 12	Rhythm Thief & the Paris Caper Original Soundtrack	Raphael	Boku no kodō, Nisemono VS honmono-kun	WWCE-31333	Duet (Hana Takeda)
2014	March 26	Variety CD Kin'iro no Corda 3 AnotherSky Feat. Jinan	Serizawa Mutsumi	ROSY ROSA ROSY	KECH-1679	
2014	April 30	Kamigami no Asobi OP 「TILL THE END」	Loki Laevatein	TILL THE END	MFCZ-1044	
2014	April 30	Kamigami no Asobi ED 「REASON FOR...」	Loki Laevatein	REASON FOR...	MFCZ-1045	
2014	April 30	The Prince of Tennis II Memorial Best	Shiraishi Kuranosuke	like bored days, Speed Star	NECA-70082～86	
2014	May 30	Tsukiuta. – Rainy Day	Uzuki Arata	Rainy Day	TKUT-0025	Duet (KENN)
2014	May 30	Tsukiuta. – Tsuki to, Hoshi to, Maboroshi to	Uzuki Arata	Tsuki to, Hoshi to, Maboroshi to	TKUT-0028	Duet (KENN)
2014	July 30	THE PRINCE OF TENNIS II SHITENHOJI SUPER STARS	Shiraishi Kuranosuke	Reisei to Hakunetsu	NECA-33005	
2014	August 27	Kamigami no Asobi Character Song Series Balder & Loki	Loki Laevatein	Round and Round	QECB-64	
2014	October 8	Free! -Eternal Summer- Original Soundtrack Clear Blue Notes	Sosuke Yamazaki	Clear Blue Departure	LACA-9364, LACA-9365	Group
2014	October 8	Ginga aidoru chō kareshi 08. Kaiōsei no kikyō	Kikyo	Kaiōsei no rondo	GUMO-57	
2014	October 15	Free! Eternal Summer Character Song Vol.6	Sosuke Yamazaki	Last Race to tomorrow., Just Wanna Know	LACM-14256	
2014	November 26	Kamigami no Asobi VI Character duet	Loki Laevatein	Yggdrasil	MFXT-0028, MFXT-0028A	Duet (Hiroshi Kamiya)
2014	December 17	Yu-Gi-Oh! Arc-V ED Future fighter!	Reiji Akaba	Future fighter!	MJSS-9135	Duet (Kenshō Ono)
2015	January 7	Party Time	STONES (Shiraishi Kuranosuke)	Party Time	NECM-10212	Group
2015	February 11	Ace of Diamond Character Song Series Vol.7	Tetsuya Yūki	BILLION SWINGS	PCCG-70243	
2015	February 27	Tsukiuta. – GRAVITY!	Six Gravity (Uzuki Arata)	GRAVITY!	TKUT-0037, TKUT-0038	Group
2015	April 15	Empty Sky	Shiraishi Kuranosuke	Empty Sky	NECM-10223	
2015	April 25	I DOLL U Theme song 「I DOLL U」/Re;Rise	Re;Rise (Moroboshi Seiya)	I Doll U	EYCA-10304	
2015	May 20	Shingan Crimsonz: Falling Roses/Crimson quartet -Akaki Shijuso-	Shingan Crimsonz (Rom)	Falling Roses, Crimson quartet -Akaki Shijuso-	PCCG-70255	Group
2015	May 27	Party Time	Tachikiri Tai (Shiraishi Kuranosuke)	Party Time	NECM-10217	
2015	August 5	Star-Myu: High School Star Musical – ☆☆Eien★STAGE☆☆	Kakeru Tengenji	☆☆forever★STAGE☆☆	GNCA-1408	Group
2015	August 28	Tsukiuta. – Kimi, Mai Oriru	Uzuki Arata	Kimi, Mai Oriru, Yozakura ni Madowasarete	TKUT-0059, TKUT-0060	
2015	September 16	SHOW BY ROCK!! Vol. 4	Rom	The real reason	PCXE-50544	
2015	October 7	I DOLL U Character Solo Song Series Moroboshi Seiya	Moroboshi Seiya	Sekai o teki ni mawashite mo, I Doll U -Seiya solo ver.-	EYCA-10308	
2015	October 21	Star-Myu: High School Star Musical – ☆SHOW TIME 3☆	Kakeru Tengenji	Tenka no Hana	GNCA-0412	
2015	November 4	Star-Myu: High School Star Musical – ☆SHOW TIME 5☆	Team Otori (Kakeru Tengenji)	Quintet ～Quintet～	GNCA-0414	Group
2015	November 25	Star-Myu: High School Star Musical – ☆SHOW TIME 8☆	Team Otori (Kakeru Tengenji)	Ready→Steady→Dream!	GNCA-0417	Group
2015	December 2	Q Transformer: Saranaru Ninkimono e no Michi	Optimus Prime	DESTINY〜400man'nenmae kara itoshi teru~	QTBD-002, QTDV-002	
2015	December 9	Star-Myu: High School Star Musical – ☆SHOW TIME 10☆	Team Otori (Kakeru Tengenji)	Hoshikuzu Mūbumento	GNCA-0419	Group
2015	December 18	The Heroic Legend of Arslan Vol. 6	Daryun	Tatakai, soreha kishi no shinjitsu	GNXA-1766, GNBA-2346	
2015	December 23	Star-Myu: High School Star Musical – ☆SHOW TIME 12☆	Team Otori (Kakeru Tengenji)	Seishun COUNTDOWN, Seishun COUNTDOWN～Tengenji Solo Ver.～	GNCA-421	Group
2015	December 30	Kenka Bancho Otome Character Song CD Vol.3	Kira Rintarou	Maverick	REDS-603	
2016	January 7	I DOLL U -Complete Music Disc-	Re;Rise (Moroboshi Seiya)	I Doll U, I Doll U -idol version-, Sekai o teki ni mawashite mo	EYCA-10719	
2016	January 27	Ensemble Stars! Vol.8 "Trickstar"	Trickstar (Hokuto Hidaka)	Rebellion Star, CHERRY HAPPY STREAM, Kibō no seishun uta	FFCG-0024	Group
2016	January 27	Star-Myu: High School Star Musical Vol. 2 Limited Edition Bonus CD	Kakeru Tengenji	Angel Lost	GNXA-1802, GNBA-2372	
2016	February 10	Genei Ibun Roku#FE Vocal collection FORTUNA ALL STARS	Yashiro Tsurugi	BLACK RAIN, Under the moon, Fire Emblem ~Hikari no gikyoku~, Smile Smile	AVCD-93392	
2016	February 12	Tsukiuta. – Six Gravity best album 「Kurotsuki」	Six Gravity (Uzuki Arata)	Sakura to Tomo ni Kimi dake wo	TKUT-78	Group
2016	March 30	Variety CD Kin'iro no Corda 3 EverySky	Serizawa Mutsumi	ROSY ROSA ROSY, CRAZY CRAZE CRAZY, CRAZY CRAZE CRAZY（Serizawa Solo Ver.）	KECH-1759	
2016	April 27	Fire Emblem if Original Soundtrack	Shigure	Arubekimichi no Hateni, if〜Hitori omou〜Remembrance	TSZM-0049～0056	
2016	May 18	Ushio and Tora Character Songs	Nagare Akiba	Kawaita Tamashī	TKCA-74361	Duet (Daisuke Namikawa)
2016	June 22	Konomi Takeshi ☆ Surprise LIVE ~ One Person Tenipuri Festa ~	Shiraishi Kuranosuke	Brave heart 〜Ballad Version〜	NEZA-90020	
2016	July 8	Kamigami no Asobi InFinite Character duet	Loki Laevatein	Give me your heart -Mayoerukohitsuji-	QECB-54	Duet (Hiroshi Kamiya)
2016	August 17	Bungou Stray Dogs character mini album sonoichi	Kunikida Doppo	Waga risō ni kumorinashi	LACA-15581	
2016	August 25	Oumagatoki ~Kakuriyo no Enishi~ Limited Edition Drama CD	Hayate	Kakuriyo no Fuchi		
2016	August 26	Tsukiuta. THE ANIMATION Theme Song CD	Six Gravity (Uzuki Arata)	GRAVITIC-LOVE	TKUT-0123	Group
2016	September 21	Boku Ni Totte	KNIFE OF DAY (Ishida Yamato)	Boku Ni Totte, WHICH	NECM-13026	
2016	October 5	Handa-kun Character mini album	Akane Tsutsui	Homare ~ homare ~	LACA-15587	
2016	November 25	Tsukiuta. THE ANIMATION Volume 3 Benefits CD	Uzuki Arata	cerasus~Sakuranamiki ni Michibikarete~	TKAM-0005, TKAM-0006	
2016	December 14	Tenipuri Song 800 Bun no Only One! -Tick-	Shiraishi Kuranosuke	Dear Prince, Love Festival, Koi no Gekidasa ECSTASY!	NECA-18007	
2016	December 14	Tenipuri Song 800 Bun no Only One! -Vai-	Shiraishi Kuranosuke	go on	NECA-18008	
2016	December 21	Mo fu doru bōkaru CD Melody Of Fantasy – egao no Chikara -	No Limits (Suō Arata)	Melody Of Fantasy – egao no Chikara -, Mo fumo fu Wonderland	QECD-10	
2016	December 22	Tanaka-kun Is Always Listless 7 Special limited edition	Ohta	Sewa yaki Sunshine	BCXA-1132, BCBA-4776	
2017	January 25	Ensemble Stars! Vol.10 "Trickstar"	Trickstar (Hokuto Hidaka)	HEART→BEATER!!!!, Nijiiro no Seasons	FFCG-0041	Group
2017	January 26	Gekijōban Meiji Tokyo Renka Meiji – Romanesque Records 2	Tōsuke Iwasaki	Twilight Preview	ANI-1352	
2017	March 24	Tsukiuta. THE ANIMATION Volume 7	Six Gravity (Uzuki Arata)	Tsuki no Uta。	TKAM-0014, TKAM-0013	Group
2017	March 29	Digimon Adventure Tri. Character Song "Erabareshi Kodomo Tachi Hen"	KNIFE OF DAY (Ishida Yamato)	Boku Ni Totte -Album Edition-	NECA-33006, NECA-30338	
2017	April 26	Star-Myu: High School Star Musical – ☆2nd SHOW TIME 4☆	Kakeru Tengenji	Hanamichi ∞ Go All Out! !	GNCA-0484	Group
2017	May 27	Attack on Titan 2 character songs Vol.05	Reiner Braun	Alternative Drive	PCCG-70395	Duet (Tomohisa Hashizume)
2017	June 14	Star-Myu: High School Star Musical – ☆2nd SHOW TIME 11☆	Team Otori (Kakeru Tengenji)	Growin' Up	GNCA-0491	Group
2017	June 21	100 Sleeping Princes and the Kingdom of Dreams sound 100 series~ Vol.4 Yuki no kuni ~ Frost & Graysia & Synny	Graysia	Shirayuki ni hohoemi o	EYCA-11201	Duet (Tarusuke Shingaki) (Hiro Shimono)
2017	June 21	Star-Myu: High School Star Musical – ☆2nd SHOW TIME 12☆	Team Otori (Kakeru Tengenji)	Gift ~ Team Ōtori Ver.~, Gift ~ Curtain Call ~	GNCA-0492	Group
2017	August 2	Tenipuri Song 800 Bun no Only One! -Tick- 2	Shitenhouji Chuu (Shiraishi Kuranosuke)	Naniwa no Soran Bushi	NECA-18010	Group
2017	August 2	Tenipuri Song 800 Bun no Only One! -Vai- 2	Shiraishi Kuranosuke	Empty Sky	NECA-18011	
2017	September 6	Tenipuri Song 800 Bun no Only One! -Tick- 3	Shiraishi Kuranosuke	Iroa Senai Ano Sora e, Party Time, Aozora STAGE, Katte ni Shiten Fesuta	NECA-18013	
2017	September 6	Tenipuri Song 800 Bun no Only One! -Vai- 3	Shiraishi Kuranosuke	Speed Star	NECA-18014	
2017	November 8	FREE-STYLE SPIRIT/What Wonderful Days!!	Sosuke Yamazaki	What Wonderful Days!!	LACM-14685	Group
2018	January 25	Meiikoi Character Song Series Romanesque Record Best Album	Tōsuke Iwasaki	Twilight Preview	MESC-0225	
2018	March 28	Kuroko no Basuke Character Song Best Collection	Hyūga Junpei	Clutch Time, Arigatou no Kawarini	LACA-9582 ～ LACA-9585	Duet (Kenji Hamada)
2018	March 28	Yu-Gi-Oh! Arc-V VOCAL BEST!!	Reiji Akaba	Future fighter!	MJSA-01239	Duet (Kenshō Ono)
2018	May 2	Butter-Fly～tri.Version～	Ishida Yamato	Butter-Fly～tri.Version～	NECM-16004	Group
2018	October 24	Star-Myu: High School Star Musical – STAR-MYU in Halloween	Kakeru Tengenji	DEAR DREAM!	GNXA-1838, GNBA-2398	Duet (Natsuki Hanae) (Tomoaki Maeno)
2019	March 20	Fire Emblem Premium Arrange	Grima	Id (Purpose)	QWCI-00004	Duet (Yū Kobayashi)
2019	June 5	Sarazanmai no uta/Kawausoiya	Mabu Akutsu	Kawausoiya	SVWC-70415	Duet (Mamoru Miyano)
2019	June 19	P SHOW BY ROCK!!	Shingan Crimsonz (Rom)	Anti-Destiny	PCCG−01798	Group
2019	July 10	Star-Myu: High School Star Musical – ☆3rd SHOW TIME 2☆	Kakeru Tengenji	NEW NOW！	GNCA-0582	Group
2019	August 7	Star-Myu: High School Star Musical – ☆3rd SHOW TIME 6☆	Kakeru Tengenji	Magic Time Maker	GNCA-0586	Group
2019	September 4	Star-Myu: High School Star Musical – ☆3rd SHOW TIME 10☆	Team Otori (Kakeru Tengenji)	COME ON LET'S GO！	GNCA-0590	Group
2019	November 25	Tsukiuta. – Kuromochizuki	Six Gravity (Uzuki Arata)	cerasus~Sakuranamiki ni Michibikarete~, Tsuki no Uta。	TKUT-0220	
2020	January 17	Genei Ibun Roku#FE Encore Best Sound Collection	Yashiro Tsurugi	BLACK RAIN, Under the moon, Fire Emblem ~Hikari no gikyoku~, Smile Smile	AVCD-96414	

=== Max Boys ===
Single

Release date	Title	Identification No.	
Release date	Title	Limited Edition	Standard Edition
February 15, 2012	Sakura (大切なもの」, Important thing)	UMCA-59003	UMCA-50011
August 15, 2012	Miracle of Love (恋のキセキ, HEART & SOUL)	UMCA-59006	UMCA-50020
April 17, 2013	Journey to your Profile" and magic (「旅立つ君の横顔に」, On your profile Journey)	UMCA-59013	UMCA-50030

Album

Release date	Title	Identification No.	Oricon chart position
December 12, 2012	I Wish (消えない絆, HEART & SOUL)	UMCA-19002; UMCA-19003; UMCA-10011	-

== Accolades ==
Year	Award	Result
2014	1st Aniradio Awards for Best Benefit Radio – Tensai Gunshi	Won
2014	8th Seiyu Awards for Best Supporting Actor	Won
2016	10th Seiyu Awards for Best Supporting Actor	Won
