= 1602 (disambiguation) =

1602 was a year of the Gregorian and Julian calendar

1602 may refer to:

- 1602, the number 1602
- 1602 AM, an AM radio frequency
- Marvel 1602, a comic book limited series published by Marvel Comics
- Anno 1602, a computer game
- A postal code of Vlezenbeek in Belgium
- 1602 standard LCD, a 16 character, 2 row, standard LCD
  - Mostly using HD44780 LCD controller
