= 82.5 FM =

FM radio frequency

== Known radio broadcasts ==
The following radio stations broadcast on FM frequency 82.5 MHz:

=== Japan ===
- JOAK-FM at Tokyo
