= Hiroshi Ikushima =

Japanese announcer and financial planner (born 1950)

- 生島 ヒロシ
- Born: December 24, 1950 (age 75); Kesennuma, Miyagi, Japan
- Occupations: Announcer, financial planner
- Years active: 1976 - 2025
- Agent: Ikushima Planning Office
- Relatives: Takashi Ikushima (brother); Jun Ikushima (brother); Sho Ikushima (brother)
- Website: Official profile

Hiroshi Ikushima (生島 ヒロシ, Ikushima Hiroshi; born December 24, 1950, in Kesennuma, Miyagi, Japan) is a Japanese announcer and financial planner who is the chief executive officer of Ikushima Planning Office. He is the visiting professor of Tohoku Fukushi University.

Ikushima was a TBS announcer.

== Filmography ==
=== TBS ===
Year	Title	Notes
1977	Doyō Wide Radio Tokyo	Radio
1977	Mitsubishi Fuso Zenkoku Jūdan Hiroshi Akira no Asadesu yo!	Radio
1978	Hiroshi Ikushima no Yoru wa Tomodachi II	Radio, main personality
	Mū Ichizoku	
1979	Yūyake Ron-chan	
1979	Check and Check	
1980	Ohayō 700	
1980	TV Rettō 7-ji	
1980	The Best Ten	
1981	Ningen Fushigi Fushigi	
1982	Machikado TV 11:00	
1983	Ryōri Tengoku	Corner charge
1984	Wakaru ka na? World Gesture	Presenter
1985	Super Wide Pīpuru	Radio
1985	Dokumamushisandayū no Soyō Wide Shōbai Hanjō	Radio
1985	Expo Scramble	General chair
1986	Takeshi's Castle	
1986	Akko ni Omakase!	Continued after retiring from TBS
1987	Mama wa Idol!	Episode 4
1987	Papa wa Newscaster	
	Sokogashiritai	"Kakueki Teisha Rosen Bus no Tabi" reporter
	Japan Record Award	Announcer
	Waratte Pon	
	Sō Tennenshoku Variety Kitano TV	

=== After TBS ===
Year	Title	Network	Notes
1989	Hiroshi Ikushima no Oishī Frying Pan	Fuji TV	
1989	Sora to Umi o Koete	TBS	
1989	Time Shock	TV Asahi	
1989	Zen Nihon Kayō Ongaku-sai	TV Asahi	
1990	Music Station	TV Asahi	
1990	Hiroshi Ikushima no Motto Jiyūna Seikatsu	Fuji TV	
1990	Kazemakase Shin Shokoku Manyū-ki	Fuji TV	
1990	Big Morning	TBS	
1992	TV Time Machine	TV Asahi	
1993	Wedding Bell	TBS	
1993	Super Soccer	TBS	
1994	Ohayō! Nice Day	Fuji TV	
1995	Totsugeki! Kazoku Wars	TV Tokyo	
1995	Quiz 21! Jack o Nerae	TV Asahi	
1995	Nan Demo Ranking Batoran Q	TV Asahi	
1995	Takeshi no Banbutsu Sō Seiki	TV Asahi	
	News ni Chōsen! Anata no Jōshiki	TV Tokyo	
	Dai Chōsa! Naruhodo Nihonjin	TV Tokyo	
1998	Hiroshi Ikushima no Ohayō Teishoku	TBS Radio	
1998	Hiroshi Ikushima no Ohayō Itchokusen	TBS Radio	
2007	Karuchā SHOwQ: 21 Seiki TV Kentei	Higashimeihan Net 6	
2007	Jukuchō Hiroshi Ikushima no Teinen Juku	Chiba TV	
2012	Tatsujin Michi	Chiba TV	
2012	Hiroshi Ikushima no Saturday Itchokusen	TBS Radio	

=== Films ===
Year	Title	Notes
1994	J-League o 100-bai Tanoshiku Miru Hōhō!!	

=== Advertisements ===
Year	Title	Notes
	Saishunkan "Tsūsantō"	Radio ad
2005	Kojima (Bic Camera Group)	
	Nuclear Waste Management of Japan (NUMO)	
2009	Tohoku Electric Power	
	Nikko Cordial	
	Riberesute	
	Urabandai Nekoma Hotel	
	Meganetop Megane Shijō	
	Musashino Foods Kenkō Takuhai	
	TKC Zenkoku-kai	
	Nippon Supplement	Radio ad
	Ajinomoto Gurina	
