= 1602 AM =

AM radio frequency

Copies of the World Radio TV Handbook (including the 1991 edition) have identified 1602 kHz as a local frequency, akin to the Class C (former Class IV) radio stations in North America which are limited to 1kW.

The following radio stations broadcast on AM frequency 1602 kHz:

== Australia ==
- 2CP in Cooma, NSW (ABC SE New South Wales)
- 5LC in Leigh, SA (ABC North & West)
- 3WL in Warrnambool, VIC (ABC South West Victoria)

== Japan ==
- JOCC in Asahikawa
- JODD in Fukuyama
- JOFD in Fukushima
- JOKC in Kofu
- JOSB in Kitakyushu

== Korea ==
- HLQE Sabuk (KBS-1)

== The Netherlands ==
- Radio Seagull in Leeuwarden

== The Philippines ==
- DZUP in Quezon City
