= NHK AM =

Japanese national radio station

- Logo used since 30 March 2026
- Japan
- Frequency: MW in kHz: 540, 549, 567, 576, 585, 594, 612, 639, 666, 675, 684, 729, 756, 819, 837, 891, 927, 945, 963, 990, 1071, 1188, 1296, 1323, 1368, 1503

Programming
- Language: Japanese
- Format: News, talk, sport and drama

Ownership
- Owner: NHK
- Sister stations: NHK Radio 2 (1931–2026); NHK FM

History
- First air date: 12 July 1925; 101 years ago
- Former names: Tokyo Broadcasting Station (1925); NHK Radio 1 (1931–2026)

Technical information
- Power: 300kW (594KHz JOAK)

Links
- Webcast: NHK Net Radio (only in Japan)
- Website: NHK.or.jp/r1/

Former logo for NHK Radio 1st Broadcast (NHKラジオ第1放送 / NHK Rajio Dai-ichi Hōsō), used between 2024 and 2026.

NHK AM, formerly known as NHK Radio 1 (NHKラジオ第1放送, NHK Rajio Dai-ichi Hōsō), is a national radio network in Japan, and is operated by the public broadcaster NHK. With its first broadcast on 12 July 1925, it is Japan's oldest radio station, and during World War II, it often broadcast official announcements.

Its programming consists of news, and current affairs, and is broadly similar to that put out by national public broadcasters of other countries, such as the United Kingdom's BBC Radio 4, and Radyo 1 in Turkey. NHK AM is primarily broadcast on medium wave with FM relays in remote areas. Their callsign is JOAK in Tokyo, but varies throughout the nation depending on location.

Following the closure of NHK Radio 2 in late March 2026, NHK Radio 1 was renamed NHK AM.

List of frequencies
Region	City	Call sign	Frequency	Power
Hokkaido	Sapporo	JOIK	567 kHz	100 kW
Hokkaido	Hakodate	JOVK	675 kHz	5 kW
Hokkaido	Asahikawa	JOCG	621 kHz	3 kW
Hokkaido	Obihiro	JOOG	603 kHz	5 kW
Hokkaido	Kushiro	JOPG	585 kHz	10 kW
Hokkaido	Kitami	JOKP	1188 kHz	10 kW
Hokkaido	Muroran	JOIQ	945 kHz	3 kW
Tōhoku	Sendai	JOHK	891 kHz	20 kW
Tōhoku	Akita	JOUK	1503 kHz	10 kW
Tōhoku	Yamagata	JOJG	540 kHz	5 kW
Tōhoku	Morioka	JOQG	531 kHz	10 kW
Tōhoku	Fukushima	JOFP	1323 kHz	1 kW
Tōhoku	Aomori	JOTG	963 kHz	5 kW
Kantō-Kōshin'etsu	Tokyo	JOAK	594 kHz	300 kW
Kantō-Kōshin'etsu	Nagano	JONK	819 kHz	5 kW
Kantō-Kōshin'etsu	Niigata	JOQK	837 kHz	10 kW
Kantō-Kōshin'etsu	Kōfu	JOKG	927 kHz	5 kW
Tōkai-Hokuriku	Nagoya	JOCK	729 kHz	50 kW
Tōkai-Hokuriku	Kanazawa	JOJK	1224 kHz	10 kW
Tōkai-Hokuriku	Shizuoka	JOPK	882 kHz	10 kW
Tōkai-Hokuriku	Fukui	JOFG	927 kHz	5 kW
Tōkai-Hokuriku	Toyama	JOIG	648 kHz	5 kW
Kansai	Osaka	JOBK	666 kHz	100 kW
Kansai	Ōtsu	JOQP	945 kHz	1 kW
Chugoku	Hiroshima	JOFK	1071 kHz	20 kW
Chugoku	Okayama	JOKK	603 kHz	5 kW
Chugoku	Matsue	JOTK	1296 kHz	10 kW
Chugoku	Tottori	JOLG	1368 kHz	1 kW
Chugoku	Yamaguchi	JOUG	675 kHz	5 kW
Shikoku	Matsuyama	JOZK	963 kHz	5 kW
Shikoku	Kōchi	JORK	990 kHz	10 kW
Shikoku	Tokushima	JOXK	945 kHz	5 kW
Shikoku	Takamatsu	JOHP	1368 kHz	5 kW
Kyushu-Okinawa	Fukuoka	JOLK	612 kHz	100 kW
Kyushu-Okinawa	Kitakyushu	JOSK	540 kHz	1 kW
Kyushu-Okinawa	Kumamoto	JOGK	756 kHz	10 kW
Kyushu-Okinawa	Nagasaki	JOAG	684 kHz	5 kW
Kyushu-Okinawa	Kagoshima	JOHG	576 kHz	10 kW
Kyushu-Okinawa	Miyazaki	JOMG	540 kHz	5 kW
Kyushu-Okinawa	Ōita	JOIP	639 kHz	5 kW
Kyushu-Okinawa	Saga	JOSP	963 kHz	1 kW
Kyushu-Okinawa	Naha	JOAP	549 kHz	10 kW

== See also ==
- NHK Radio 2
- NHK General TV
- NHK FM
