= Time Shock (game show) =

Japanese television series

- Also known as: Quiz Time Shock
- Presented by: Jirō Tamiya (1969-1978); Takashi Yamaguchi (1978-1986); Hiroshi Ikushima (1989-1990); Hideyuki Nakayama; Chiharu Niiyama; Takeshi Kaga (Time Shock 21)
- Narrated by: Hiroshi Kitano, Maasaki Yajima
- Country of origin: Japan
- No. of episodes: 888 (Original run; 1969-1986); 22 (1989 revival); 65 + 9 specials (Time Shock 21); 18 specials (Super Time Shock)

Production
- Production location: Kantō region
- Running time: 30 minutes (original version; 1989 revival); 54 minutes (Time Shock 21); 2-3 hours (2002-2007 specials; Super Time Shock); 2-3 hours (The Time Shock

Original release
- Network: ANN (TV Asahi)
- Release: January 9, 1969 – March 27, 1986
- Release: October 18, 1989 – March 21, 1990
- Release: October 16, 2000 – June 17, 2002
- Release: March 27, 2008 – December 26, 2012

Time Shock (タイムショック, Taimu Shokku), is a game show airing in Japan. Its original run, titled Quiz Time Shock (クイズタイムショック, Kuizu Taimu Shokku), was broadcast between 1969 and 1986, airing for 888 episodes; another series aired from 1989 to 1990, which was canceled after just 22 episodes. A second revival, Time Shock 21, broadcast 65 episodes between 2000 and 2002. Afterwards, a series of periodic specials titled Time Shock aired from 2002 through 2007, plus one in 2007 titled New Time Shock (新タイムショック, Shin Taimu Shokku). The most recent revival was a series of specials titled Super Time Shock (超タイムショック, Chō Taimu Shokku); 18 specials were broadcast from March 27, 2008 to December 26, 2012.

== Game play (Time Shock) ==
First, the contestant was raised to the top of the on-set clock set piece in an elevator chair. After a brief interview, the contestant selected one of 10 packets of questions; each packet contained 12 questions. The contestant had 60 seconds to answer all 12 questions. The questions were read by the announcer at five-second intervals; players could interrupt the reading of the question to give an answer. Each correct answer earned an increasing amount of money, as follows:

Correct answers	Prize		
Correct answers	1969–1985	1985–1986	1989–1990
1	¥1,000		
2	¥2,000		
3	¥3,000		
4	¥4,000		¥10,000
5	¥5,000		¥20,000
6	¥10,000		¥30,000
7	¥20,000		¥40,000
8	¥30,000	¥40,000	¥50,000
9	¥40,000	¥60,000	
10	¥50,000	¥100,000	
11	¥100,000	¥150,000	¥200,000
12	¥1,000,000		

At the end of the round, the contestant was lowered back to floor level; if the contestant failed to answer at least four questions correctly, the chair would be rapidly spun as the contestant was lowered. In the 1989-1990 run, jets of dry ice (the predecessor of the modern CO₂ jets used in nightclubs or concerts) would also be activated, and the prize money would be lost; in this instance, the contestant would win a plush doll. Also in the 1989-90 run, certain packets could contain "shock" questions; failing to answer a shock question correctly would end the round and forfeit the prize money.

== Game play (Time Shock 21) ==
In Time Shock 21, teams of five contestants played for the right to face "Final Time Shock" (played the same way as the original Time Shock). In earlier episodes, five teams competed over three rounds, or "stages," with low-scoring teams being eliminated along the way.

=== Five-team rules (first season) ===
==== Stage 1 (Opening Time Shock) ====
Each team faced a round of 10 questions, to be answered in 60 seconds. Each player was directed a question in turn, and had 6 seconds to answer (including the time used to read the question). No conferring or passing was allowed. The three teams with the highest scores advanced (tiebreaker questions were asked, if necessary). In addition, a team had to answer at least five questions correctly to qualify.

==== Stage 2 (Visual Time Shock) ====
A series of visual puzzles were played. These puzzles often made extensive use of CGI. Typical puzzles might be identifying a picture as a Rubik's Cube solves itself (with the picture replacing one of the colors), identifying a famous person based on paintings and clues by grade school kids, or identifying an object as a karate expert kicks a block of stone into the shape of the object. Each puzzle had a time limit of either 20 or 60 seconds; when a player buzzed in, the timer stopped. If the player was right, their team scored a point; if not, that player was eliminated for the rest of the puzzle, and the time resumed. In addition, an incorrect answer in the last 10 seconds of a 20-second puzzle, or the last 20 seconds of a 60-second puzzle eliminated a second player from the puzzle. 60-second puzzles sometimes had three parts, such as spotting three differences between two otherwise-identical pictures or video clips, or spotting three things that are wrong with the scene; in these instances, each part counted for one point. The first two teams to score three points advanced to "Data Time Shock."

==== Stage 3 (Data Time Shock) ====
Each team was given a question in which the top 10 answers were ranked in some way. Played in a similar manner to Family Feud, each player, in turn, tried to identify one of the top 10 answers. No passing was allowed; a player had to give an answer (whether one of the top 10 or not) to allow the next player to offer an answer. Each team had 60 seconds to give as many answers as possible, and the team that scored higher won the game and played Final Time Shock. In addition, a score of 5 correct answers or better was required to qualify.

==== Final Time Shock ====
The team elected one of its players to face Final Time Shock, which was played in the same way as the original series (60 seconds to answer 12 questions; 5 seconds, including time used to read it, to answer each question). The prize money earned was divided among the team, and was as follows:

- 1 correct answer: ¥10,000
- 2 correct answers: ¥30,000
- 3 correct answers: ¥50,000
- 4 correct answers: ¥100,000
- 5 correct answers: ¥200,000
- 6 correct answers: ¥300,000
- 7 correct answers: ¥500,000
- 8 correct answers: ¥1,000,000
- 9 correct answers: ¥2,000,000
- 10 correct answers: ¥3,000,000
- 11 correct answers: ¥5,000,000
- 12 correct answers: ¥10,000,000

If the contestant failed to accumulate at least 6 correct answers, they were subjected to a "Tornado Spin," in which the chair would flip the contestant upside down in addition to rotating as the player descended.

=== Two-team rules (second season) ===
In later episodes, only two teams would compete against each other in "Visual Time Shock," played the same way as in episodes with five teams. The first team to correctly solve three puzzles would play "Final Time Shock."

Under two-team rules, the team's representative had to answer 6 questions correctly in "Final Time Shock" to win any money. The payouts were as follows:

- 6 correct answers: ¥500,000
- 7 correct answers: ¥1,000,000
- 8 correct answers: ¥2,000,000
- 9 correct answers: ¥3,000,000
- 10 correct answers: ¥4,000,000
- 11 correct answers: ¥5,000,000
- 12 correct answers: ¥10,000,000

As before, a player failing to answer 6 questions correctly would be subjected to a "Tornado Spin." In addition, the team would begin by having three players attempt "Final Time Shock." If any player failed to answer the required 6 questions correctly, the team lost all of their winnings, and the game ended; the game would also end if the team's winnings reached the maximum of ¥10,000,000 (whether by one player correctly answering all 12 questions or through the total accumulated by two or more players). Once three players have earned money in "Final Time Shock," the team has the choice of ending the game and taking the accumulated money or playing another round with a fourth player; if that player wins money in their round, the team is then given the same choice with the last remaining player. The game ends regardless of the final total once all five players have attempted "Final Time Shock."

Later, the rules were changed so that the team had to either reach the maximum ¥10,000,000 or have all five players attempt "Final Time Shock" to win the accumulated money. However, if three players succeeded before the fourth or fifth player failed to reach the required 6 correct answers, then the team would win a consolation prize of ¥1,000,000.

== Game play (The Time Shock) ==
The Time Shock is played in a tournament-style competition with 24 players which began airing in the spring and fall of 2017.

=== Preliminaries ===
The preliminary round is a two-minute game. All 24 players get to answer 24 questions to decide who will compete in the first round.

=== Round 1 ===
The first round is divided up into 12 two-player matches. Both players will have sixty seconds to answer 12 questions. The top twelve players will move on to round two.

=== Round 2 ===
In the second round, the twelve players will compete in a series of categories. The top six scorers will play in the semifinals.

=== Semifinals ===
The semifinal game is called Two-Player Endless Time Shock. In this game, six players will compete in three two-player games with no time limit. If a player gets two wrong answers, the game ends and their opponent will move on to the final round. Only three will advance.

=== Finals ===
The final round is called Survival Time Shock with four players. Each time a player gets the required number of correct answers, they will survive to the next stage. If they don't, then their run is over. The required number of answers looks like this:

- Stage 1: 8 answers
- Stage 2: 9 answers
- Stage 3: 10 answers
- Stage 4: 11 answers
- Final Stage: 12 answers

The last player standing wins the tournament. The winner receives ¥1,000,000.
