= List of The Prince of Tennis video games =

The Prince of Tennis is a video game series that has games for the Game Boy Advance, Nintendo 3DS, Nintendo DS, PlayStation, PlayStation 2, and mobile platforms. All of the following video games have only been released in Japan. Most were published by Konami, with the exception of The Prince of Tennis II: Go to the Top, published by FuRyu.

== Game Boy Advance ==
- The Prince of Tennis: Genius Boys Academy
- The Prince of Tennis: Aim at the Victory!
- The Prince of Tennis: 2003 Passion Red
- The Prince of Tennis: 2003 Cool Blue
- The Prince of Tennis: Minna no Oujisama
- The Prince of Tennis: 2004 Stylish Silver
- The Prince of Tennis: 2004 Glorious Gold

== Nintendo 3DS ==
- The Prince of Tennis II: Go to the Top

== Nintendo DS ==
- The Prince of Tennis 2005: Crystal Drive
- The Prince of Tennis Driving Smash - Side Genius
- The Prince of Tennis Driving Smash - Side King
- The Prince of Tennis: Doubles no Oujisama - Girls, be gracious!
- The Prince of Tennis: Doubles no Oujisama - Boys, be glorious!
- The Prince of Tennis: Motto Gakuensai no Oujisama -More Sweet Edition-
- The Prince of Tennis: Gyutto! Doki Doki survival umi to yama no love passion

== PlayStation ==
- The Prince of Tennis
- The Prince of Tennis: Sweat & Tears

== PlayStation 2 ==
- The Prince of Tennis: Smash Hit
- The Prince of Tennis: Sweat & Tears 2
- The Prince of Tennis: Kiss of Prince -Flame Version-
- The Prince of Tennis: Kiss of Prince -Ice Version-
- The Prince of Tennis: Smash Hit 2
- The Prince of Tennis: Love of Prince -Bitter-
- The Prince of Tennis: Love of Prince -Sweet-
- The Prince of Tennis: Form the Strongest Team
- The Prince of Tennis: Rush and Dream
- The Prince of Tennis: Gakuensai no Oujisama
- The Prince of Tennis: Doki Doki Survival - Sanroku no Mystic
- The Prince of Tennis: Doki Doki Survival - Umibe no Secret
- The Prince of Tennis: Card Hunter

== Mobile ==
- The Prince of Tennis II & Tennis Puzzle
- The Prince of Tennis II: Rising Beat
