= NHK Radio 2 =

Japanese national radio station

- Japan
- Broadcast area: Japan

Programming
- Format: Education, language lessons

Ownership
- Owner: NHK
- Sister stations: NHK AM; NHK FM

History
- First air date: April 6, 1931
- Last air date: March 30, 2026

Links
- Webcast: NHK Net Radio (only available in Japan)

NHK Radio 2 (NHKラジオ第2放送, NHK Rajio Dai-ni Hōsō) was a Japanese radio station operated by the public broadcaster, NHK. Its output consists of education and culture programming acting as the radio version of NHK Educational TV in a broadly similar way to South Korea's EBS FM. NHK Radio 2 is available mainly on AM. It began broadcasting on April 6, 1931.

In case of major tsunami warnings, Radio 2 broadcasts translated information in Japanese, English, Chinese, Korean and Portuguese. These four additional tracks are simulcast from the digital audio subchannels of the terrestrial NHK television networks.

It ceased broadcasting on March 30, 2026, after 95 years of airing.

== History ==
It was created in 1931 as a predominantly educational station in an attempt to boost NHK's educational goals; since there were only three stations in 1939, the existing Tokyo station (JOAB) as well as the Osaka (JOBB) and Nagoya (JOCB) stations adopted the name "City Broadcasting". Broadcasts were suspended in December 1941 due to the Pacific War, but were resumed on September 1, 1945, after the end of the war and Japan's surrender.

Until the early 1980s, there were also industrial support programs that existed before the war, such as "Radio Agricultural School" (an information program that introduced agricultural management and cultivation techniques on a one-off basis) and "To the People of Fishing Villages" (an information program that featured letters from fishing villages, information on local fish markets, and reports on sea trials of ships, broadcast seven days a week). In particular, from its inception until the early 1970s, the second channel also had agricultural policy programs and school broadcasts specific to each prefecture and region, but these ended by 1975, and since then, in principle, the same programs have been broadcast nationwide.

In 1982, the editorial policy was solidified to "produce social education programs that satisfy listeners' intellectual curiosity in the nighttime schedule". As a result, "NHK Radio Seminar," which led to the current "Culture Radio", began airing live every night except Sunday around 9 PM (a 45-minute slot; originally a revamped version of the "NHK Culture Series" that started live broadcasting in 1976) from 1982. In addition, the policy was adopted to "move cultural, Japanese music, and art programs suitable for broadcasting on Radio 2 from Radio 1 and FM", and broadcast channels such as "Jinbutsu Shunju," "Ippatsu no Hon," "Bunka Koenkai," and "Geijutsu Tenbo" were successively moved to Radio 2. This resulted in an increase in live broadcasts of "lifelong learning programs," while conversely, school broadcasts and high school correspondence courses, which accounted for more than 20 hours of total broadcast time per week (same applies below), were reduced to 13 hours, and cultural programs aimed at lifelong learning accounted for 56 hours. Then, in 1985, school broadcasts were reduced to 4.5 hours, one-sixth of its peak at 23 hours in 1972; radio broadcasts for schools were drastically reduced.

In 1984, the station underwent a major restructuring, establishing a "Lifelong Education Department" within the Program Production Bureau to shift Educational Television and Radio 2 towards becoming "lifelong learning and education channels". In particular, they aimed to "systematically organize language programs, school broadcasting programs, and diverse cultural programs", further strengthening live broadcasts of language courses and establishing a basic weekly structure consisting of a four-day introductory course for beginners in the first half of the week and a two-day advanced course for advanced learners on the weekend (with some exceptions, such as English).

The broadcast time for these language courses, which in 1951 accounted for only 1.5 hours (a mere 1% of the total broadcast time), increased 40-fold in half a century: 34 hours and 10 minutes (26.4%) in 1971, 37 hours and 5 minutes (29%) in 1982, and 56 hours and 15 minutes (40.9%) in 2001. Almost half of the day was, by the 2000s, dedicated to live or rebroadcast language courses. Initially starting with six languages — English, French, German, Chinese, Russian and Spanish — the language courses expanded to eight languages in the 1980s and 90s with the addition of Korean (Hangul) and Italian. Furthermore, Portuguese and Arabic have been added in the 2000s. English learning programs include the "Basic English Series," as well as a variety of courses for advanced learners such as "Advanced Basic English" and "English Conversation," and "Easy Business English" for learning business English, creating a curriculum that can meet the needs of a wide range of students, from beginners to those learning everyday conversation and business English.

== Background to closure ==
It has been suggested that NHK Radio 2 will shut down and the AM network will be reduced to one network. On January 13, 2021, NHK drafted a plan aiming at the 2025 fiscal year. The goal was to reformat the AM frequencies in order to limit to NHK Radio 1. It was suggested that the shutdown was planned for 2025.

The management committee will compile public opinion for the total closure of the station at the end of 2025 and, after approval by the Diet, the official decision to close the station will be taken, with total closure scheduled for 2026. On November 28, 2025, the Ministry of Internal Affairs and Communications scheduled the closure to be March 31, 2026. The date was later revised to 29 March 2026.

In order to carry out a demonstration experiment in preparation for the closure of Radio 2 Broadcasting, starting from the reorganization in the spring of 2022, the English language course program "Basic English for Junior High School Students" (Level 1) was broadcast on a trial basis from 6 o'clock (Monday to Friday) on NHK Radio 1. Level 2 of the course was broadcast on NHK FM. In 2023, "Radio English Conversation" and "Radio Business English" were added at 7 o'clock.

On March 30, 2026, the station shut down and its programs were partitioned between NHK Radio 1 (to be renamed NHK AM effective that date) and NHK FM, which absorbed most of its programs, mainly language courses. The closure of NHK Radio 2 also brought to an end a handful of programmes not transferred to the remaining stations, including a 101-year run of comprehensive stock market reports on the radio, Arabic lessons, and social welfare seminars.

== Shutdown ==
The station closed at 12:05am JST on the early hours of March 30, 2026, after a short program regarding the reorganization of NHK Radio, followed by the call sign of the local station (except for Hokkaido stations, which always only identified with a generic "NHK Radio 2" ID). The goal of its closure is to save approximately 37 billion yen over a twenty-year period. On 30–31 March, the station's frequencies ran instrumental music for the length of the broadcast day (5:55am-11.45pm JST), accompanied with announcements regarding the closure of the station and explaining where individual programmes had moved during each programme's respective timeslot, with the stations ceasing transmissions at various times, and JOAB in Tokyo transmitting all the way to the end of the broadcast day on the 31st.

== Frequencies ==
Region	City	Call sign	Frequency	Power
Hokkaido	Sapporo	JOIB	747 kHz	500 kW
Hokkaido	Hakodate	JOVB	1467 kHz	1 kW
Hokkaido	Asahikawa	JOCC	1602 kHz	1 kW
Hokkaido	Obihiro	JOOC	1125 kHz	1 kW
Hokkaido	Kushiro	JOPC	1152 kHz	10 kW
Hokkaido	Kitami	JOKD	702 kHz	10 kW
Hokkaido	Muroran	JOIZ	1125 kHz	1 kW
Tōhoku	Sendai	JOHB	1089 kHz	10 kW
Tōhoku	Akita	JOUB	774 kHz	500 kW
Tōhoku	Yamagata	JOJC	1521 kHz	1 kW
Tōhoku	Morioka	JOQC	1386 kHz	10 kW
Tōhoku	Fukushima	JOFD	1602 kHz	1 kW
Tōhoku	Aomori	JOTC	1521 kHz	1 kW
Kantō-Kōshin'etsu	Tokyo	JOAB	693 kHz	500 kW
Kantō-Kōshin'etsu	Nagano	JONB	1467 kHz	1 kW
Kantō-Kōshin'etsu	Niigata	JOQB	1593 kHz	10 kW
Kantō-Kōshin'etsu	Kōfu	JOKC	1602 kHz	1 kW
Tōkai-Hokuriku	Nagoya	JOCB	909 kHz	10 kW
Tōkai-Hokuriku	Kanazawa	JOJB	1386 kHz	10 kW
Tōkai-Hokuriku	Shizuoka	JOPB	639 kHz	10 kW
Tōkai-Hokuriku	Fukui	JOFC	1521 kHz	1 kW
Tōkai-Hokuriku	Toyama	JOIC	1035 kHz	1 kW
Kansai	Osaka	JOBB	828 kHz	300 kW
Chugoku	Hiroshima	JOFB	702 kHz	10 kW
Chugoku	Okayama	JOKB	1386 kHz	5 kW
Chugoku	Matsue	JOTB	1593 kHz	10 kW
Chugoku	Tottori	JOLC	1125 kHz	1 kW
Chugoku	Yamaguchi	JOUC	1377 kHz	5 kW
Shikoku	Matsuyama	JOZB	1512 kHz	5 kW
Shikoku	Kōchi	JORB	1152 kHz	10 kW
Shikoku	Takamatsu	JOHD	1035 kHz	1 kW
Kyushu-Okinawa	Fukuoka	JOLB	1017 kHz	50 kW
Kyushu-Okinawa	Kitakyushu	JOSB	1602 kHz	1 kW
Kyushu-Okinawa	Kumamoto	JOGB	873 kHz	500 kW
Kyushu-Okinawa	Nagasaki	JOAC	1377 kHz	1 kW
Kyushu-Okinawa	Kagoshima	JOHC	1386 kHz	10 kW
Kyushu-Okinawa	Miyazaki	JOMC	1467 kHz	1 kW
Kyushu-Okinawa	Ōita	JOID	1467 kHz	1 kW
Kyushu-Okinawa	Naha	JOAD	1125 kHz	10 kW

== See also ==
- NHK AM
- NHK Educational TV
- NHK FM
