= NHK FM =

Japanese national radio station

- Japan
- Broadcast area: Nationwide (terrestrial/online)
- Frequencies: 82.5 MHz (Tokyo), and others
- Branding: NHK-FM

Programming
- Language: Japanese
- Format: Classical music, Contemporary hit radio, Japanese pop music, few news

Ownership
- Owner: NHK
- Sister stations: NHK AM; NHK Radio 2 (1931–2026)

History
- First air date: 1 March 1969; 57 years ago

Technical information
- Licensing authority: MIC

Links
- Webcast: NHK Radiru

NHK FM is a Japanese radio station operated by the public broadcaster, NHK. Its programming output, which consists of classical music, jazz, rock, Japanese pop music, folk, seven times of news bulletins and talk is broadly similar to the BBC's Radio 1, Radio 2 and Radio 3 in the United Kingdom and KBS Happy FM, KBS Classic FM and KBS Cool FM in South Korea.

== History ==
NHK started test FM broadcasts on December 24, 1957 in Tokyo. This was followed by a second station in Osaka on February 20, 1958. The experimental station was based on the BBC Third Programme (the current BBC Radio 3). In 1964, there were now 26 NHK FM stations, covering 70% of the country.

Between 1962 and 1965, the following stations opened:

- September 17, 1962: Hiroshima, Fukuoka
- December 2, 1962: Sapporo, Sendai, Nagoya, Matsuyama, Kumamoto
- April 1, 1964: Shizuoka, Okayama, Yamaguchi, Kochi
- May 1, 1964: Kitakyushu, Nagasaki
- June 1, 1964: Morioka, Akita
- June 25, 1964: Asahikawa
- July 1, 1964: Fukushima, Niigata, Nagano, Kanazawa, Toyama, Matsue, Miyazaki, Kagoshima
- December 2, 1964: Hakodate, Obihiro, Muroran, Aomori, Yamagata, Tottori
- February 5, 1965: Kushiro, Fukui
- March 1, 1965: Kofu, Tokushima, Oita
- March 22, 1965: Takamatsu, Saga
- March 27, 1965: Kitami

It wasn't until March 1, 1969 that these broadcasts became regular. Since the beginning, the station had played a wide variety of music genres.

== See also ==
- NHK
