= Globis Capital Partners =

Japanese hands-on venture capital firm

Globis Capital Partners Co., Ltd.
- Native name: グロービス・キャピタル・パートナーズ株式会社
- Romanized name: Gurōbisu Kyapitaru Paatonaazu kabushiki gaisha
- Formerly: Apax Globis Partners & Co.
- Company type: private
- Industry: Private equity Venture capital
- Founded: commenced operations 1996; 30 years ago as capital division of Globis; incorporated March 1999; 27 years ago as Apax Globis Partners & Co.; renamed April 2004; 22 years ago
- Founders: Yoshito Hori
- Headquarters: Tokyo, Japan
- Key people: Yoshito Hori (Founding Partner); Soichi Kariyazono (Co-Founding Partner)
- Products: Investment; Private equity fund
- AUM: ¥180 billion JPY (2023)
- Parent: Globis
- Website: www.globiscapital.co.jp/en

Globis Capital Partners Co., Ltd. (Japanese: グロービス・キャピタル・パートナーズ株式会社, Hepburn: Gurōbisu Kyapitaru Paatonaazu kabushiki gaisha; English: /ɡloʊbɪs/), commonly referred to as GCP, and formerly known as Apax Globis Partners & Co., is a Japanese private hands-on venture capital firm headquartered in Banchō, Chiyoda, Tokyo, Japan. GCP is part of the Globis Group. As of April 2023, GCP manages a cumulative fund size of over ¥180 billion JPY (approximately US$1.3 billion).

== History ==
In 1996 Yoshito Hori founded Globis Capital Partners (GCP) as a hands-on venture capital business inside Globis Corporation to support Japanese startup portfolio companies That same year an initial 540 million yen GLOBIS Incubation Fund was raised. Globis Corporation, Yoshito Hori as general partner, and Soichi Kariyazono as managing partner contributed a combined 40 million yen to the fund. The remaining amount was covered by institutional investors and other companies, including about $1 million invested by Sega Enterprises’ chairman Isao Okawa.

In 1999 Alan Patricof, the head of Apax Patricof selected Globis as a local partner in Japan to create Apax Globis Partners & Co. (AGP), a joint VC. The resulting Apax Globis Japan Fund raised $187 million.

In April 2004, Apax Globis Partners & Co. changed its name to Globis Capital Partners. In 2006, GLOBIS Fund III was raised. Globis Capital Partners Co., Ltd. was established as an independent advisory company to oversee the fund, becoming a separate entity from Globis Corporation.

Four additional funds were raised in 2013, 2016, 2019 and 2022. Globis Capital Partners reached a cumulative fund size of over ¥180 billion JPY (approximately $1.3 billion) with investments in over 200 Japanese companies in 2023.

In 2019 GCP established G-STARTUP, a startup accelerator program aimed at producing 100 unicorn companies. By 2023 the program had provided support to 173 startups.

On January 14, 2020, GCP announced the formation of GCP X, a specialized value-added team tasked organizational development, CXO-level recruitment support, and operational support.

Globis Fund VII LP became the biggest private equity fund launched in 2022 that includes Japan as geographic focus. Japan's Government Pension Investment Fund (GPIF) disclosed that same year that it would invest in Globis Capital Partners’ latest VC fund, a first in Japan.

In April 2024 GCP established a local office in San Francisco to support the global expansion of its portfolio companies.

== Investments ==
=== 1990s ===
- In 1999, Apax Globis Partners invested $3.5 million in ERP system manufacturer Works Applications.

=== 2000s ===
- In August 2000, Apax Globis Partners invested $8.7 million in TV anime producer Gonzo Digimation Holdings.
- In July 2005, GCP invested about 100 million yen in internet media company Gree.

=== 2010s ===
- In April 2011, GCP joined a 350 million yen funding round in internet company KAYAC Inc.
- In May 2012, GCP led a $3.6 million Series A round in e-learning platform Quipper.
- In May 2013, GCP together with GMO VenturePartners invested a combined 300 million yen in crowdsourcing platform Lancers
- In August 2013, GCP invested a 420 million yen in Gocro, Inc., the company behind smartphone news app SmartNews.
- In December 2013, GCP joined a $6 million funding round for EV sports car startup GLM.
- In March 2014, GCP helped to raise $14 million in funding for C2C marketplace Mercari. GCP also participated in a $5.8 million Series A2 round in e-learning platform Quipper.
- In September 2014, GCP participated in a 472 million yen Series C fundraiser for business intelligence platform Uzabase.
- In March 2015, GCP participated in a $10 million funding round in news app SmartNews.
- In March 2016, GCP joined a $75 million Series D fundraiser for peer-to-peer marketplace app Mercari
- In May 2016, GCP helped to raise 1.1 billion yen for handmade marketplace Creema.
- In October 2019, GCP joined a $42.9 million Series B for AI Medical Service, which develops AI-based software for gastric cancer detection.
- In November 2019, GCP participated in a $92 million funding round for news app SmartNews.

=== 2020s ===
- In August 2021, GCP co-led a $73 million Series B round in B2B supply chain marketplace CADDi with World Innovation Lab.
- In July 2023, GCP joined a $170 million Series B round of funding in Japanese robotics startup Telexistence. GCP increased its investment in B2B supply chain marketplace CADDi during a $89 million Series C round.
- In September 2023, GCP led a $93 million Series B round with Global Brain for Josys, a SaaS and device management platform startup.
- In August 2023, GCP joined the final close of the $100 million Series E fundraising for social impact and microfinancing startup Gojo & Company.
- In April 2024, GCP led a 2.92 billion yen pre-series A round in AI manga localization startup Orange.
- In October 2024, GCP joined a Series B funding round in Japanese real estate database provider estie. together with Vertex Growth, University of Tokyo Edge Capital, and Global Brain. GCP led the funding of startup Ookuma Diamond Device (ODD), which raised a total of approximately $45 million (6.7 billion yen). GCP joined a $21 million Series A funding round for Sun Metalon, a startup specialized in sustainable metal manufacturing.
- In April 2025, GCP led a 480 million yen third-party allotment of shares in sports DX startup Knowhere.
- In May 2025, GCP invested 100 million yen in Tensor Energy which operates cloud platform “Tensor Cloud” aimed at renewable energy power plants. It also joined a $23 million Series B round in edtech startup Manabie.

== Investment funds ==
Fund	Vintage Year	Capital (¥ JPY)
GLOBIS Incubation Fund	1996	¥540 million
Apax GLOBIS Japan Fund (joint fund with Apax Partners	1999	¥20 billion
GLOBIS Fund III	2006	¥18 billion
GLOBIS Fund IV	2013	¥11.5 billion
GLOBIS Fund V	2016	¥20 billion
GLOBIS Fund VI	2019	¥40 billion
GLOBIS Fund VII	2022	¥72.7 billion

== Notable investments ==
- Akatsuki Games: videogame company
- Gree: internet media company
- Mercari: e-commerce platform
- SmartNews: news aggregator app
- Works Applications: ERP system manufacturer

== See also ==
Yoshito Hori
