= LuckyFes =

Annual music festival in Japan

LuckyFes ラッキーフェス
- Genre: Rock, alternative, electronic, metal, hip hop and pop
- Frequency: Annually
- Locations: Hitachi Seaside Park, Hitachinaka, Ibaraki
- Coordinates: 36°24′02″N 140°35′29″E
- Years active: 23 July 2022 – present
- Inaugurated: 23 July 2022; 4 years ago
- Founder: Yoshito Hori
- Most recent: 13-15 July 2024
- Next event: 9-11 August 2025
- Attendance: 60,000 (2024)
- Organiser: LuckyFM Ibaraki Broadcasting System
- Sponsor: Globis, Ameba TV
- Website: luckyfes.com/en/ (in English)

LuckyFes (Japanese: ラッキーフェス, Hepburn: Rakkii Fesu) is an annual three-day music festival held mid-July in Hitachi Seaside Park, Hitachinaka, Ibaraki, Japan, organized by LuckyFM Ibaraki Broadcasting System. The line-up contains Japanese musicians from major and independent record companies.

== History ==
Following the departure announcement of Rock in Japan Festival from Hitachi Seaside Park in Hitachinaka, Ibaraki at the start of 2022, Yoshito Hori, the owner of Ibaraki broadcaster LuckyFM Ibaraki Broadcasting System decided to create a new music festival at the vacated location, with himself as self-appointed festival producer. A crowdfunding campaign for the new festival raised over ¥30 million yen on ReadyFor by April 2022. LuckyFM Green Festival or LuckyFes in short was held for the first time on July 23-24, 2022 as a two-day event. The festival became a three-day event in 2023. attracting 42,000 visitors.

Illustrator Jun Inagawa was appointed as art and creative director in 2023 to oversee the public art exhibition on the festival grounds.

== Performances ==
=== 2022 ===
Line-up included:

==== Green Stage ====
Saturday	Sunday
Anri; DIAMANTES; Golden Bomber; KG9（O.A）; Nanase Aikawa; Puffy AmiYumi; Rip Slyme; Tatsuya Ishii	13ELL; AKLO; Awich; Cz Tiger; DJ K-1; DJ LEAD; DJ RYOW; Dowg (O.A）; Hannya; JAPANESE MAGENESE; Jasmine (Japanese singer); JOYLIIFE（O.A）; JP THE WAVY; Lunv Loyal; MASTER BRIDGE（O.A）; MC TYSON; t-Ace; ¥ellow Bucks; Yin And Yang（O.A）

==== Lucky Stage ====
Saturday	Sunday
53+84（DJ）; Adachi Yuto; Chai (band); Isoyama Jun; Ivy to Fraudulent Game; MAYA・RINA TAKAMI（O.A）; Nagie Lane; Nicori Light Tours; Tatsuro Mashiko; yayuyo	Lucky Tapes; Monthly Mu & New Caledonia; MORISAKI WIN; RIP DISHONOR（O.A); Special Others; Takashi Matsunaga; TENDRE; TOOBOE; Wednesday Campanella; Win Morisaki; YAMATOMAYA（O.A）

==== Water Stage ====
Saturday	Sunday
Brahman (band); Creepy Nuts; Happy Heads NANIYORI; Macaroni Empitsu; MAIKI (O.A); Man with a Mission; Mitsuhiro Hidaka; Novelbright; SiM (band); SKY-HI	ALI (band)+CrossOver Finale; Clench & Blistah; Doberman Infinity; Micro from Def Tech; Miyavi; Shinnosuke; SIRUP; yama

=== 2023 ===
Line-up included:

==== Green Stage ====
Saturday	Sunday	Monday
Awich; C&K; Japanese Magenese; JP THE WAVY; Kaori Kishitani; Lucky Kilimanjaro; Rondo; Umeda Cypher; yonawo	ano; Frederic (band); I Don't Like Mondays.; JUN SKY WALKER(S); Reol (singer); Rinne; t-Ace; Uchikubigokumon-Doukoukai; Wednesday Campanella	Atarashii Gakko!; Camellia Factory; Fruits Zipper; Golden Bomber; Huwie Ishizaki; Nanase Aikawa; Regallily; Shiritsu Ebisu Chugaku; Shit Kingz

==== Hills Stage ====
Saturday	Sunday	Monday
Ai Higuchi; AFJB; Enon Kawatani; Hakubi; Ivy to Fraudulent Game; MAKI; MAYA・Karin（O.A）; moon drop; Necry Talkie; TOSHIMITSU	13ELL; Age Factory; Cz TIGER; Lunv Loyal; MUSIC PLANET; Nicori Light Tours; Orange Spiny Crab; Sakamoto Shinnosuke; the quiet room; Tokyo Syoki Syodo; WST	Aile The Shota; Amefurasshi; EAERAN; FOMARE; Haramichan; Kaneyorimasaru; Novel Core; SHADOWS; TETORA; yangskinny

==== Lucky Space ====
Saturday	Sunday	Monday
Ai Higuchi x Oswald; DJ DEKKACHAN; DJ Dynoji; DJ SEIRA; Ibarapper a.k.a Ibaraking; KEN EBISAWA; Kenichiro Tanimoto; Nagie Lane; UWTO BLND	DJ OVER; DJ Misoshiru & MC Gohan; DJ YU-KI; Isoyama Jun; Sayaka Sasaki; Tatsuro Mashiko; Tsubasa Suzuki	Adachi Yuto; Clitoric Ris; DJ JETMAN; DJ OVER; KATSUMI; KYOTARO TO HARUHIKO; Mao Uchu; Nagi Nemoto

==== Water Stage ====
Saturday	Sunday	Monday
Aska (singer); Creepy Nuts; Gesu no Kiwami Otome; Kana-Boon; Kyuso Nekokami; Mucc; Rottengraffty; Takanori Nishikawa; yama	Def Tech; Flumpool; Humbreaders; Kim Jae-joong; Kreva (musician); Maki Ohguro; Novelbright; Raise A Suilen; Sambomaster	ALI; Clench & Blistah; CreepHyp; Da-ice; Harukamirai; Kyary Pamyu Pamyu; Orange Range; SKY-HI; Shōnan no Kaze
