= Yoshito Hori =

Japanese venture capitalist and educator (born 1962)

- 堀 義人
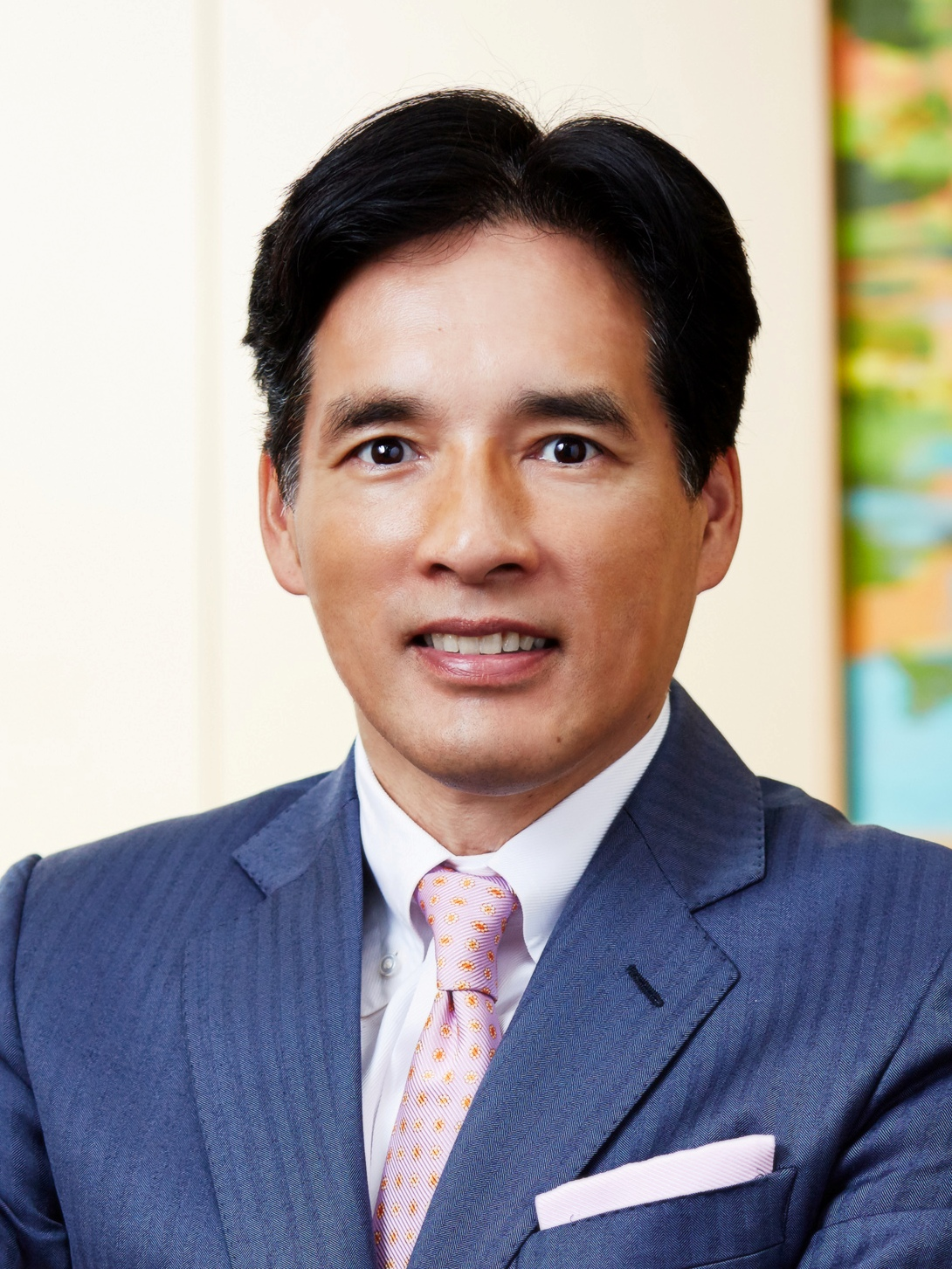
- Yoshito Hori in June 2012
- Born: 28 March 1962 (age 64); Niihama, Ehime Prefecture, Japan
- Education: Kyoto University (BS), Harvard University (MBA)
- Occupations: Educator, venture capitalist
- Years active: 1986–present
- Known for: Graduate School of Management, Globis University
- Title: Founder and President of Globis Corporation; Founder and Managing Partner of Globis Capital Partners; Founder and President of Graduate School of Management, Globis University; President of G1 Institute; President of Kibow Foundation; Owner of Ibaraki Robots; Owner of LuckyFM Ibaraki Broadcasting System
- Children: 5
- Awards: Medal with Dark Blue Ribbon (紺綬褒章, konju hōshō) (2020, 2021, 2022, 2024); Medal with Blue Ribbon (藍綬褒章, ranju hōshō) (2024)

Yoshito Hori (堀義人, Hori Yoshito) (born March 28, 1962) is a Japanese businessman, educator, and venture capitalist. He is the founder and president of Globis Corporation and Globis University Graduate School of Management. He is also founder and managing partner of Globis Capital Partners, president of the G1 Institute and the Kibow Foundation, and owner of the Ibaraki Robots basketball team and radio broadcaster LuckyFM Ibaraki Broadcasting System.

== Early life ==
Yoshito Hori was born in Niihama, Ehime Prefecture on March 28, 1962. Hori spent most of his early youth at Tōkai, Ibaraki where his father worked as a nuclear researcher. At age 3 he moved to New York in the United States with his family. About 2 years later his family moved to Michigan. Hori moved back to Japan during the second grade of elementary school. Around the end of sixth grade his family relocated to Mito, Ibaraki Prefecture.

Hori attended Ibaraki Prefectural Mito First High School (茨城県立水戸第一高等学校・附属中学校, Ibaraki Kenritsu Mito Daiichi Kōtōgakkō Fusoku Chūgakkō) in his hometown of Mito, which he graduated in 1981. After high school he entered Kyoto University where he completed a BSc in Engineering in 1986.

Hori started his career at Sumitomo Corporation in 1986 where he was in charge of new business development and foreign trade of production-plant facilities. He was able to secure sponsorship from his employer in 1989 to study at Harvard Business School. While studying at Harvard Business School, Hori was highly influenced by his classmates in deciding to pursue entrepreneurship. He observed how the US provided a fertile business environment for start-ups. Hori set out to replicate a similar environment in Japan by creating an ecosystem of knowledge, people and capital. Hori obtained his MBA in 1991. He left Sumitomo in 1992 to start his own business.

== Globis Group ==
=== Globis Corporation ===
Hori established Globis Corporation in Japan on August 1, 1992 with 800,000 yen (about $7,500 USD) in capital. He first approached his alma mater about opening a Harvard Business School franchise in Japan but was turned down. A licensing agreement was made, however, allowing Harvard case studies to be used. Hori started teaching a single marketing course based on the case study method from a small rented classroom in Shibuya, Tokyo. Additional business subjects such as finance were subsequently introduced. This started Globis Management School (GMS), the company’s business education department.

By 1993 Globis Management School had expanded to three campus locations in Tokyo, Osaka and Nagoya. A joint MBA program with the University of Leicester was launched in 1996, later discontinued in January 2008. In 2003 the Graduate Diploma in Business Administration (GDBA) was launched, a non-degree program and predecessor to the later MBA degree offered after the establishment of Graduate School of Management, Globis University. GDBA was discontinued in 2013.

Globis expanded into several new business areas following Globis Management School. In 1993 a corporate training service was launched. In 1995 Globis’s first MBA book series was published. Executive training programs were added in 2005. In 2016 the online learning service GLOBIS Manabihodai was launched. The company introduced a LMS platform in 2018. By 2022, Globis had 691 employees, offices in Tokyo, Osaka, Nagoya, Sendai, Fukuoka, and Yokohama, and overseas subsidiaries in China, Singapore, Thailand, the United States and Belgium.

=== Globis Capital Partners ===
In 1996 Hori founded Globis Capital Partners (GCP) as a hands-on VC firm to support various startup portfolio companies. That same year an initial $5 million venture fund was raised, with $1 million coming from Sega Enterprises’ chairman Isao Okawa. In 1999 the Apax Globis Japan Fund worth $187 million was jointly raised with Apax Partners. Five additional funds were raised in 2006, 2013, 2016, 2019 and 2022. Global Capital Partners reported it reached a cumulative fund size of over ¥160 billion JPY (approximately $1.2 billion) invested in over 190 Japanese companies in 2022. Notable portfolio companies that went public include e-commerce platform Mercari, internet media company GREE, and news aggregator app SmartNews. Japan's Government Pension Investment Fund (GPIF) disclosed in 2022 that it would invest in Globis Capital Partners’ latest VC fund, a first in Japan.

=== Globis University ===
Since founding Globis, Hori's goal had been to create a graduate school of management, but the financial and legal requirements to establish a university in Japan proved too difficult. However, in April 2003, the Act on Special Zones for Structural Reform (構造改革特別区域法, kōzō kaikaku tokubetsu kuiki hō), which was created by the Second Koizumi Cabinet, allowed provisions for a new for-profit university established by a private company (株式会社立大学, kabushiki gaisha ritsu daigaku). This paved the way for Globis to offer higher education degrees accredited by MEXT. Globis established a new entity, the Graduate School of Management, Globis University, which was accredited by MEXT in December 2005 as a for-profit university established by a private company.

A first batch of 78 students enrolled in the Japanese taught two-year part-time MBA in April 2006, offered at campus locations in Tokyo and Osaka. By 2007, Hori had decided that the Graduate School of Management, Globis University should become a non-profit incorporated educational institution (学校法人, gakkō hōjin). This change would establish an endowment fund supported by retained earnings and donations, which would support the educational environment and campus facilities over the long term. MEXT approved the entity change in April 2008.

As of 2022, the university has a total enrollment of 2,683 students and an annual intake of 1,050 students, making it the largest business school in Japan. Domestic campuses are located in Tokyo, Osaka, Nagoya, Fukuoka, Sendai, Yokohama, and Mito. Four additional overseas locations are maintained in Singapore, Thailand, San Francisco, and Brussels.

== Political positions ==
=== Nuclear power ===
Hori has asserted a pro-nuclear opinion following the Fukushima nuclear accident. Hori is positive on renewable energy but argues a stable and reliable energy supply cannot be achieved in Japan without nuclear power. He contends abandoning nuclear power would prompt manufacturers to offshore production, resulting in severe damage to the Japanese economy. Hori has stated ensuring nuclear power plant safety as a key requirement for restarting nuclear reactors. In 2011 Hori got into a heated argument on Twitter with Softbank’s Masayoshi Son who he accused of being a "businessman with political contacts" (政商, seishō) for using the nuclear power phase-out argument to boost Softbank’s solar power business. In response, Son called Hori out for being a pro-nuclear activist and challenged him to a thorough discussion (トコトン議論, tokoton giron). The pair eventually agreed to a one-on-one public debate on nuclear power on August 5, 2011 which lasted over 3 hours and was livestreamed on Nico Nico Douga (ニコニコ動画, niko niko dōga) (current Niconico). The debate ended amicably. Son declared he would not take any revenue or dividends from his solar power business for at least 40 years. In response Hori withdrew his earlier accusations. Hori lauded the discussion as a win for Japanese citizens in terms of drawing public interest to Japan’s energy policy.

== National advocacy ==
=== G1 Institute ===
In 2009 Hori founded the G1 Summit as a “forum for the leaders of the next generation to gather, discuss, and paint a vision for the rebirth of Japan in a turbulent world”. The G1 Institute, which Hori serves as president, was subsequently established to support an increasing number of annual conferences and initiatives around Japan.

=== 100 Actions ===
In 2011 Hori initiated the 100 Actions (100行動, hyaku kōdō) project, which aimed to create a future vision for Japan and provide public policy recommendations in the wake of the 2011 Tōhoku earthquake and tsunami. The project culminated in the release of a book in 2016.

== Social entrepreneurship ==
=== Kibow Foundation ===
Just days after the destruction of the 2011 Tohoku earthquake and tsunami, Hori together with other young entrepreneurs launched Project Kibow to help in the efforts to support and rebuild disaster-affected areas. The word Kibow is a portmanteau of the Japanese word for hope (希望, kibō) and bow (ボー, bō), derived from rainbow, signifying "a bridge between Japan and the rest of the world". In half a year the project raised ¥99 million yen in donations. Project Kibow was incorporated as the Kibow Foundation early 2012. In 2013, Hori was named a Young Presidents’ Organization Global Impact Project honoree for his efforts. In 2015 the Kibow Impact Investment Fund with a net value of ¥500 million yen was raised to support social entrepreneurship.

=== Local development ===
Hori has been an ambassador for Ibaraki Prefecture (いばらき大使, ibaraki taishi) from 2011. When Hori visited Mito in August 2015 for a high school swimming team reunion, he was shocked by the decline of the town he grew up in. This led him to launch the Mito Downtown Revitalization Project (水戸ど真ん中再生プロジェクト, mito donmannaka saisei purojekuto), a public-private initiative to revive the local area economically through tourism and other initiatives in February 2016. Hori's first initiative was to purchase the Ibaraki Robots basketball team in April 2016. The team was promoted to the Japanese B1 League division in 2021. In 2019, Hori became the majority owner of LuckyFM Ibaraki Broadcasting System, the only local radio station in Ibaraki Prefecture. The scope of the radio station was expanded to internet media. IBS, the nickname of the radio station was changed to LuckyFM on April 1, 2021, a playful reference to Ibaraki.

Following the departure announcement of Rock in Japan Festival from Hitachi Seaside Park in Hitachinaka, Ibaraki early 2022, Hori decided to create a new music festival organized by LuckyFM at the vacated location, with himself as self-appointed festival producer. A crowdfunding campaign for the new festival raised over ¥30 million yen on ReadyFor by April 2022. LuckyFM Green Festival or LuckyFes in short was held for the first time on July 23–24, 2022.

== Recognition ==
For his donations of private funds for the public good, Hori was awarded the Medal with Dark Blue Ribbon (紺綬褒章, konju hōshō) by the Japanese government in 2020, 2021, 2022, and 2024. Hori received the Medal with Blue Ribbon (藍綬褒章, ranju hōshō) from the Japanese government for his contributions to society in 2024.

== Boards and memberships ==
Hori has served as a board member and advisor for organizations both in Japan and globally.

- B.League board member (2019-2021)
- Harvard Business School alumni board member (2005-2008)
- Japan Association of Corporate Executives (経済同友会, Keizai Dōyūkai) sub-committee chair (until 2018)
- Japan Institute for National Fundamentals (国家基本問題研究所, Kokka Kihon Mondai Kenkyūjo) board member (2012-2018))
- Japan Venture Capital Association (日本ベンチャーキャピタル協会, Nihon Benchaa Kyapitaru Kyōkai) board member (2004-2006)
- Ministry of Economy, Trade and Industry (経済産業省, Keizai-sangyō-shō) advisory committee member
- Nihon Ki-in (日本棋院, Nihon Ki-in) director (2013-2020)
- Woodrow Wilson International Center Global Advisory Council member (from 2015)
- World Economic Forum New Asian Leaders Executive Committee; Global Growth Companies, co-chair; Global Agenda Council on New Models of Leadership
- Young Entrepreneurs’ Organization (YEO) Japan Chapter founder (1995); Asia Pacific Region board member (from 1996)
- YPO Japan Chapter member (from 2005)
- Zionex Japan Director

== Depiction in media ==
Hori was the main presenter of BS-TBS’s 13 episode Talks on Japan’s Future (ニッポン未来会議, nippon mirai kaigi) television programme aired in 2013.

== Publications ==
- Hori, Yoshito (1994). keesu de manabu kigyō senryaku ケースで学ぶ起業戦略 [The Case-Method Approach to Strategic Entrepreneurship]. Nikkei, Inc. ISBN 978-4822214111.
- Hori, Yoshito (1996). seikō suru kyaria dezain yaritai shigoto wa jibun de tsukure 成功するキャリア・デザイン―「やりたい仕事」は自分でつくれ [Career Design that Succeeds: Create the Job You Want to do Yourself]. Nikkei, Inc. ISBN 978-4532144777.
- Hori, Yoshito (2002). gojin no ninmu mba ni manabi, mba wo tsukuru 吾人の任務 MBAに学び、MBAを創る [My Personal Mission Statement]. Toyo Keizai. ISBN 978-4492041734.
- Hori, Yoshito (2004). jinsei no zahyōjiku kigyōka no seikō hōshiki 人生の座標軸―「起業家」の成功方程式 [Life’s Guiding Principles: The Success Formula of an Entrepreneur]. Kodansha. ISBN 978-4062127042.
- Hori, Yoshito (2009). sōzō to henkaku no shishitachi he 創造と変革の志士たちへ [Dear Visionary Leaders who Create and Innovate Societies]. PHP Institute, Inc. ISBN 978-4569707556.
- Hori, Yoshito (2010). gurōbisu MBA jigyō kaihatsu manejimento グロービスMBA事業開発マネジメント [Globis MBA Business Development Management]. Diamond Inc. ISBN 9784478012130.
- Hori, Yoshito (2016). nihon wo ugokasu 100 kōdō 日本を動かす「100の行動」 [100 Actions to Change Japan]. PHP Institute, Inc. ISBN 978-4569829029.
- Hori, Yoshito (2018). sōzō to henkaku no gihō inobēshon wo umitsudzukeru itsutsu no gensoku 創造と変革の技法―イノベーションを生み続ける5つの原則 [The Methodology to Create and Innovate Societies: 5 Principles for Continuing Innovation]. Toyo Keizai. ISBN 978-4492522240.
- Hori, Yoshito (2019). Dear Visionary Leaders Who Create and Innovate Societies (Kindle ed.). GLOBIS eBOOKS. ASIN B07NV5BTJV.

== Personal life ==
Hori is married and has 5 sons.
