= Abegglen =

Abegglen is a surname. Notable people with the surname include:

- Max Abegglen (1902–1970), Swiss footballer
- André Abegglen (1909–1944), Swiss footballer
- James Abegglen (1926–2007), American, later Japanese, businessman and professor in management
- Ron Abegglen (1937–2018), American college basketball coach
- Nico Abegglen (born 1990), Swiss footballer
- Cameron Abegglen (born 2001), South African rugby player, origin-Switzerland
