= Tochigi =

Tochigi (栃木) may refer to:

- Tochigi Prefecture, a Japanese prefecture
- Tochigi (city), a city in Tochigi prefecture, Japan
- Tochigi Station, a railroad station in Tochigi city, Japan
- Tochigi SC, a Japanese soccer club
- Tochigi Broadcasting, a radio station in Tochigi Prefecture, Japan
- Tochigi Television, a television station in Tochigi Prefecture, Japan
