= Globis =

Japanese business education services company

Coordinates: 35°41′7.5″N 139°44′12.3″E

Globis Corporation
- Native name: 株式会社グロービス
- Romanized name: kabushiki gaisha Gurōbisu
- Company type: Private
- Industry: Educational services E-learning; Publishing; Venture capital
- Founded: 1 August 1992; 33 years ago
- Founder: Yoshito Hori
- Headquarters: Chiyoda, Tokyo, Japan
- Area served: Worldwide
- Products: GLOBIS Unlimited e-learning platform, GLOPLA learning management system, GMAP assessment test, business management publications
- Services: Corporate training; Venture capital
- Number of employees: Globis Group: 1,004 (2025)
- Subsidiaries: Graduate School of Management, Globis University; Globis Asia Campus Pte. Ltd.; Globis Asia Pacific Pte. Ltd.; Globis China Co., Ltd.; Globis Europe BV; PT. GLOBIS Indonesia Hub; Globis Manila Inc.; Globis Thailand Co., Ltd.; Globis USA, Inc.; Globis Capital Partners; LuckyFM Ibaraki Broadcasting System; Ibaraki Robots
- Website: globis.com

Globis Corporation (Japanese: 株式会社グロービス, Hepburn: kabushiki gaisha Gurōbisu; English: /ɡloʊbɪs/), commonly referred to as Globis and stylized as GLOBIS, is a Japanese private business education company headquartered in Banchō, Chiyoda, Tokyo, Japan. It was founded in 1992 by Japanese entrepreneur Yoshito Hori. The Globis group includes the Graduate School of Management, Globis University, which is the largest graduate business school in Japan with a total enrollment of 2,525 students and an annual intake of 1,000 students in 2024. Another group addition is Globis Capital Partners, a hands-on VC firm with a cumulative fund size of over ¥160 billion JPY (approximately $1.2 billion) invested in over 190 Japanese companies in 2022.

Globis is a large corporate training provider in Japan. Over 473,000 professionals and 3,300 clients utilize its corporate education solutions annually. It has published 143 business management books which sold a combined 3.77 million copies. Globis has overseas subsidiaries in Bangkok, Thailand, Brussels, Belgium, Jakarta, Indonesia, Manila, Philippines San Francisco, United States, Shanghai, China, and Singapore.

== History ==
Globis Corporation was established by Yoshito Hori in 1992. The company was started with a capital of 800,000 yen (about $7,500 USD).

== Globis Group ==
=== Globis Capital Partners ===
Globis Capital Partners Co., Ltd. (Japanese: グロービス・キャピタル・パートナーズ株式会社, Hepburn: Gurōbisu Kyapitaru Paatonaazu kabushiki gaisha; English: /ɡloʊbɪs/) is a Japanese private venture capital firm headquartered in Banchō, Chiyoda, Tokyo, Japan. Globis Capital Partners was founded in 1996 by Yoshito Hori. It manages a cumulative fund size of over ¥180 billion JPY (approximately $1.3 billion) with investments in companies such as Mercari, Gree, and SmartNews.

== See also ==
- Graduate School of Management, Globis University
- Globis Capital Partners
