= Dead Tube =

2014 Japanese manga series

- The cover of the first volume of Dead Tube

デッドチューブ
- Genre: Thriller
- Manga
- Written by: Mikoto Yamaguchi
- Illustrated by: Touta Kitakawa
- Published by: Akita Shoten
- Magazine: Champion Red
- Original run: May 19, 2014 – present
- Volumes: 29

Dead Tube (Japanese: デッドチューブ, Hepburn: Deddo Chūbu) is a manga series, written by Mikoto Yamaguchi and illustrated by Touta Kitakawa. It has been serialized in Champion Red since May 2014. The manga is published in France by Delcourt-Tonkam.

== Plot ==
Tomohiro Machiya, a member of the Film Research Club, is called by school idol, Mai Mashiro, to film her. After he films her swimming, she asks him to film her continuously for two days and he agrees. Everything seems normal until Mashiro kills her "boyfriend" who was a former bully and delinquent, while Machiya films it all. He then finds out Mashiro is uploading videos to a website called Dead Tube, where users post content and are rewarded with money based on the number of views they get. The users are encouraged to post videos, but there is a catch: the person or people whose video gets the fewest views have to pay for the expenses and the crimes of all the other participants. As Machiya gets dragged deeper and deeper into the world of Dead Tube, he starts questioning his ambiguous relationship with Mashiro and the dark feelings lying within himself.

== Characters ==
Tomohiro Machiya (町谷 智浩)
The male protagonist of the series. He is a member of the Film Research Society. He is unwillingly brought into Dead Tube when Mashiro poses as his bully's girlfriend and has him film her while she kills his bully. In the beginning, he is easily frightened when it comes to the idea of killing, but as the series progresses, he is shown to have less and less aversion, and his fear is replaced by a dull lack of interest. He is shown to be an expert cameraman, not flinching or fazing while filming, and always catching the lead actor (usually Mashiro) in their most beautiful state. While filming, his personality changes drastically, and he remains completely focused on the film. He has a younger sister, who becomes a victim of a Dead Tube game, in an attempt to draw out his talent.
Mai Mashiro (真城 舞)
The main female protagonist of the series. She is the one who brought Machiya into Dead Tube by asking him to film her continuously for two days and then killing a bully that terrorized Machiya before the series, after posing as the bully's girlfriend. She is in love with Machiya for various reasons, and always states that he is the one "who captures me (on camera) most beautifully". She is a violent and ruthless killer, and shows little to no empathy for others, except for Machiya. She is extremely possessive of him, and will even respond with lethal force to any woman who tries to steal his affections. Her primary weapon of choice is a collapsible baton. She is also a virgin.
It is revealed that she met Machiya at one point in their childhood and became fascinated with his desire to capture beautiful things on camera, and made him promise to capture her on camera in the same way.
Hanae Miwa (三輪 花江)
Another girl in Machiya's class who got into Dead Tube carelessly without finding out all the instructions beforehand. As a result, she was under the belief that one would receive pay as long as they were first and was unaware of the penalty until Machiya warned her. After her first game, she teamed up with Machiya and Mashiro and remains the most humane in the group as she responds to death and torture in an angry manner, different from Machiya's and Mashiro's indifference. She often tries to make Machiya "normal" and is relieved by his acts of normalcy, such as lust when she tries to have sex with him, and fear when he discovers his sister is placed in a Dead Tube game. Mashiro often treats her as a rival and once tried to kill her because she nearly had sex with Machiya.
Despite her initial carefree and callous demeanor, she is actually kind-hearted and willing to place others before herself.
Mizuno Saki (水野 サキ)
A first-year member of the film research society. Although seemingly shy and kind, she plotted against Machiya behind his back along with the others. Her real personality is later revealed, being that she is a person who will do anything for money, and after being spared by Mashiro, is often hired by her and Machiya for their Dead Tube videos.

== Volumes ==
No.	Release date	ISBN
1	January 20, 2015	978-4-253-23711-6
2	July 17, 2015	978-4-253-23712-3
3	January 20, 2016	978-4-253-23713-0
4	April 20, 2016	978-4-253-23714-7
5	July 20, 2016	978-4-253-23715-4
6	November 18, 2016	978-4-253-23716-1
7	March 17, 2017	978-4-253-23717-8
8	September 20, 2017	978-4-253-23718-5
9	February 20, 2018	978-4-253-23719-2
10	July 20, 2018	978-4-253-23720-8
11	December 20, 2018	978-4-253-23736-9
12	May 20, 2019	978-4-253-23737-6
13	October 18, 2019	978-4-253-23738-3
14	March 19, 2020	978-4-253-23739-0
15	August 20, 2020	978-4-253-23740-6
16	January 20, 2021	978-4-253-23742-0
17	June 18, 2021	978-4-253-23745-1
18	November 18, 2021	978-4-253-23755-0
19	April 20, 2022	978-4-253-23759-8
20	September 20, 2022	978-4-253-23760-4
21	February 20, 2023	978-4-253-32161-7
22	August 18, 2023	978-4-253-32162-4
23	January 18, 2024	978-4-253-32163-1
24	June 19, 2024	978-4-253-32164-8
25	December 19, 2024	978-4-253-32165-5
26	May 20, 2025	978-4-253-32166-2
27	October 20, 2025	978-4-253-00463-3
28	April 20, 2026	978-4-253-01327-7
29	September 17, 2026	978-4-253-01966-8

== Reception ==
The manga was selected by Le Monde as part of "15 new manga for Japan Expo".

== See also ==
- Game of Familia, another manga series written by Mikoto Yamaguchi
- Tomodachi Game, another manga series conceptualized by Mikoto Yamaguchi
- Who Wants to Marry a Billionaire?, another manga series written by Mikoto Yamaguchi
