= Niji no Conquistador =

Japanese girl group

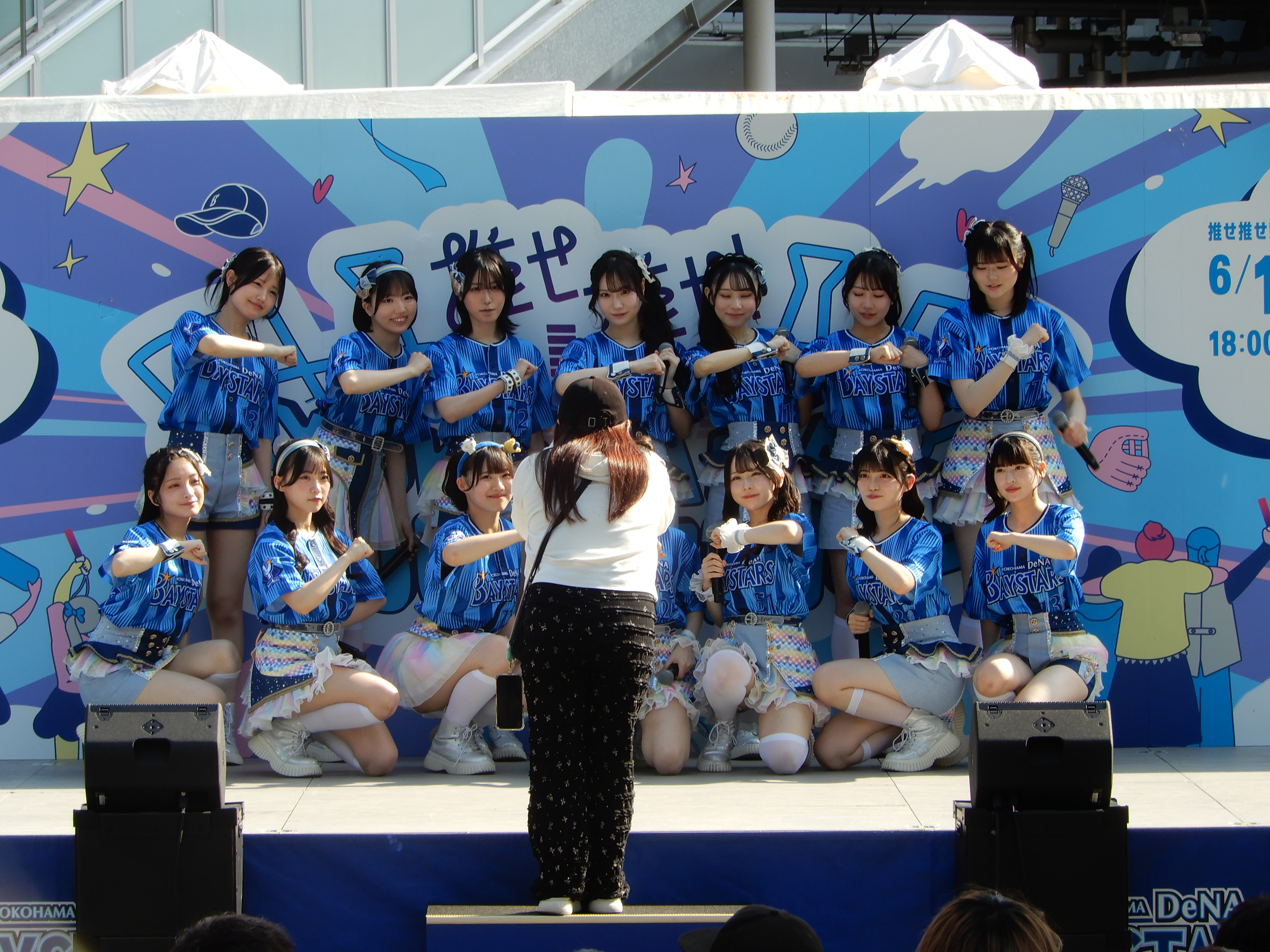
- Niji no Conquistador in 2025, at the Yokohama Arena

Background information
- Origin: Japan
- Genres: J-pop
- Years active: 2014–present
- Labels: King Records, JPU Records
- Members: Akari Nakamura; Moe Tsurumi; Ao Yamato; Nana Yamasaki; Ayame Okada; Riko Shimizu; Airi Hiruta; Marina Kumamoto; Arisa Ishihara; Juna Kanda
- Past members: Asuka Miyako; Kaneko Mizuki; Azusa Iwakura; Nanami Nishi; Hiyori Kinoshita; Yuka Ito; Minari Nagata; Marino Kai; Yuka Shigematsu; Mia Ishihara; Miyu Otsuka; Sayaka Arai; Emiri Suyama; Nonoka Okumura; Miyu Kataoka; Rio Yamamoto; Nagi Nemoto; Karin Matoba
- Website: 2zicon.tokyo

Niji no Conquistador (虹のコンキスタドール, Niji no Konkisutadōru; Rainbow Conquistador) is a Japanese girl group formed in 2014. The group's themes are illustration, cosplay, and voice acting. It was originally managed by the illustration website Pixiv as a part of the Tsukudol! Project (つくドル！プロジェクト, Tsukudoru! Purojekuto) before passing to Dear Stage.

== Members ==
Name	Birth date
Akari Nakamura (中村 朱里)	January 30, 1998 (age 28)
Moe Tsurumi (鶴見 萌)	December 5, 1996 (age 29)
Ao Yamato (大和 明桜)	May 23, 2002 (age 24)
Marina Kumamoto (隈本 茉莉奈)	July 27, 1998 (age 28)
Riko Shimizu (清水 理子)	January 28, 1997 (age 29)
Airi Hiruta (蛭田 愛梨)	March 5, 2004 (age 22)
Miyu Kirino (桐乃 みゆ)	January 16, 2001 (age 25)
Mei Ishihama (石浜 芽衣)	July 28, 2002 (age 24)
Yuika Obayashi (尾林 結花)	October 22, 2001 (age 24)
Karin Matoba (的場 華鈴)	December 30, 2000 (age 25)
Mayu Kurihara (栗原 舞優)	June 24, 2001 (age 25)
Yu Kawabata (川端 優)	December 3, 2007 (age 18)

=== Akagumi (Red Team) ===
- Akari Nakamura (中村 朱里, Nakamura Akari)
- Moe Tsurumi (鶴見 萌, Tsurumi Moe)
- Ao Yamato (大和 明桜, Yamato Ao)

=== Aogumi (Blue Team) ===
- Riko Shimizu (清水 理子, Shimizu Riko)
- Airi Hiruta (蛭田 愛梨, Hiruta Airi)
- Marina Kumamoto (隈本 茉莉奈, Kumamoto Marina)
- Miyu Kirino (桐乃 みゆ, Kirino Miyu)

=== Former members ===
- Asuka Miyako (宮古 あすか), Miyako Asuka)
- Mizuki Kaneko (金子 みずき, Kaneko Mizuki)
- Azusa Iwakura (岩倉 あずさ, Iwakura Azusa)
- Nanami Nishi (西 七海, Nishi Nanami)
- Hiyori Kinoshita (木下 ひより, Kinoshita Hiyori)
- Yuka Ito (伊藤 有香, Itō Yuka)
- Minari Nagata (長田 美成, Nagata Minari)
- Marino Kai (甲 斐莉乃, Kai Marino)
- Yuka Shigematsu (重松 佑佳, Shigematsu Yuka)
- Mia Ishihara (石原 深愛, Ishihara Mia)
- Sayaka Arai (荒井 紗也香, Arai Sayaka)
- Emiri Suyama (陶山 恵実里, Suyama Emiri)
- Nonoka Okumura (奥村 野乃花, Okumura Nonoka)
- Miyu Kataoka (片岡 未優, Kataoka Miyu)
- Rio Yamamoto (山本 莉唯, Yamamoto Rio)
- Nagi Nemoto (根本 凪, Nemoto Nagi) (left on January 11, 2022)
- Nana Yamasaki (山崎 夏菜, Yamasaki Nana)
- Miyu Otsuka (大塚 望由, Otsuka Miyu)
- Ayame Okada (岡田 彩夢, Okada Ayame)

=== Timeline ===
- Blue (vertical) = Digital singles
- Red (vertical) = Major singles
- Green (vertical) = Studio albums

== Discography ==
=== Albums ===
#	Title	Release date	Oricon peak position
1	Rainbow Spectrum	November 16, 2015	8
2	Rainbow Eclipse	December 26, 2016	12
3	Rainbow Phenomenon	January 10, 2018	-
4	The Best of Rainbow	December 12, 2018	9
5	Rainbow Gravity	June 17, 2020	4
6	Rainbow Summer Shower	July 14, 2021	16
7	Over the Rainbow: Niji no Ue ni mo 7-nen (Over the Rainbow ～虹の上にも7年～; 7 Years Over the Rainbow)	April 13, 2022	27

=== Singles ===
#	Title	Release date	Oricon peak position
1	"Nijiiro Philosophy" (にじいろフィロソフィー, Nijiiro Firosofī; Rainbow-colored Philosophy)	December 17, 2014	20
2	"Yarukkyanai! 2015" (やるっきゃない！２０１５, I Don't Have to Do It For 2015!)/Brand New Happy Days	April 8, 2015	11
3	"The Uchōten Summer!!" (THE☆有頂天サマー！！, The Uchōten Samā!!; The Ecstatic Summer!!)	August 25, 2015	3
4	"Kagirinaku Bōken ni Chikai Summer" (限りなく冒険に近いサマー, Kagirinaku Bōken ni Chikai Samā; A Summer as Close as to a Limitless Adventure)	September 20, 2016	9
5	"Kimi wa Mujaki na Natsu no Jo'ō: This Summer Girl Is an Innocent Mistress" (キミは無邪気な夏の女王 ～This Summer Girl Is an Innocent Mistress～; You're the Innocent Summer Queen: This Summer Girl Is an Innocent Mistress)	September 5, 2017	4
6	"Zutto Summer de Koishiteru" (ずっとサマーで恋してる, Zutto Samā de Koishiteru; I Will Fall in Love With Summer Forever)	September 12, 2018	5
7	"Ai o Kokoro ni Summer to Oshieyo" (愛を心にサマーと数えよ, Ai o Kokoro Samā to Oshieyo; Count Summer in Your Heart With Love)	August 10, 2019	3
8	"Snowing Love"	January 22, 2020	13
9	"Bokura no Turn" (ぼくらのターン, Bokura no Tān; Our Turn)	January 22, 2020	10
10	"Hibike! Fanfare" (響け！ファンファーレ, Hibike! Fanfāre; Sound! Fanfare)	January 22, 2020	9
11	"Koi Whiteout" (恋・ホワイトアウト, Koi Howaitoauto; Love Whiteout)	January 13, 2021	16
