= Game of Familia =

Japanese manga series

- First tankōbon volume cover

ゲーム オブ ファミリア-家族戦記- (Gēmu Obu Famiria -Kazoku Senki-)
- Genre: Adventure; Dark fantasy; Isekai
- Manga
- Written by: Mikoto Yamaguchi
- Illustrated by: D.P
- Published by: Fujimi Shobo
- English publisher: NA: Yen Press
- Imprint: Dragon Comics Age
- Magazine: Monthly Dragon Age
- Original run: May 9, 2018 – present
- Volumes: 17
- icon

Game of Familia (Japanese: ゲーム オブ ファミリア-家族戦記-, Hepburn: Gēmu Obu Famiria -Kazoku Senki-) is a Japanese manga series written by Mikoto Yamaguchi and illustrated by D.P. It began serialization in Fujimi Shobo's Monthly Dragon Age magazine in May 2018.

== Synopsis ==
After the death of his father, Sasae Hatsushima and his step-family are summoned to another world to defeat an undead army. In comparison to his stepmom and his two stepsisters, Sasae is perceived as ordinary, but he devises plans in order for his new family to survive this world.

== Media ==
=== Manga ===
Written by Mikoto Yamaguchi and illustrated by D.P, Game of Familia began serialization in Fujimi Shobo's Monthly Dragon Age magazine on May 9, 2018. The series entered its final arc in October 2025. Its chapters have been collected into seventeen tankōbon volumes as of August 2026. The series is licensed in English by Yen Press.

No.	Original release date	Original ISBN	North American release date	North American ISBN
1	October 9, 2018	978-4-04-072912-1	September 5, 2023	978-1-9753-6656-8
1. "Summoned Family"; 2. "Equivalent Exchange"; 3. "Both Light and Dark"; 4. "Double-Dyed Scoundrel"
2	April 9, 2019	978-4-04-073135-3	December 12, 2023	978-1-9753-6658-2
5. "Lightning Meteorite"; 6. "Decorated Lies"; 7. "Handed Down"; 8. "Power of Life and Death"; 9. "Self-Trapping"
3	October 9, 2019	978-4-04-073358-6	March 19, 2024	978-1-9753-6660-5
10. "Savagery and Chaos"; 11. "Single Mindedly"; 12. "Full of Tricks and Wills"; 13. "Blandishments"; 14. "Usurp the Throne"
4	March 9, 2020	978-4-04-073500-9	July 23, 2024	978-1-9753-6662-9
15. "Incur the King's Wrath"; 16. "The Prepared Never Worry"; 17. "Birth of a New King"; 18. "Change of Generations"; 19. "Science Twisted by Power"
5	August 7, 2020	978-4-04-073767-6	November 19, 2024	978-1-9753-6664-3
20. "Shadow Family"; 21. "Entrance Ordeal"; 22. "Academy of Magic"; 23. "Succession Path"; 24. "Secret Classroom"
6	February 9, 2021	978-4-04-073980-9	April 22, 2025	978-1-9753-6666-7
25. "The Wise Can Err"; 26. "An Eye for an Eye"; 27. "Tower of the Wise"; 28. "Mutual Love"; 29. "Building Bridges and Burning Them"
7	August 6, 2021	978-4-04-074206-9	August 26, 2025	978-1-9753-6669-8
30. "Strike Back"; 31. "Evenly Matched"; 32. "Hell of Uninterrupted Suffering"; 33. "Iconoclasm"; 34. "The Journey of Life"
8	March 9, 2022	978-4-04-074455-1	March 24, 2026	978-1-9753-6670-4
35. "The Atrocious Dragon and the Macabre Serpent"; 36. "The Fierce Battle Between the Dragon and the Tiger"; 37. "Even a Dead Tree Makes a Sound Like the Cry of a Dragon"; 38. "Coiled Dragon, Crouching Tiger"; 39. "A Dragon in a Pond or a Phoenix Chick"
9	August 9, 2022	978-4-04-074674-6	October 27, 2026	979-8-8554-0385-5
10	February 9, 2023	978-4-04-074866-5	January 26, 2027	979-8-8554-0387-9
11	September 8, 2023	978-4-04-075126-9	—	—
12	February 9, 2024	978-4-04-075315-7	—	—
13	August 8, 2024	978-4-04-075553-3	—	—
14	February 7, 2025	978-4-04-075795-7	—	—
15	August 8, 2025	978-4-04-076029-2	—	—
16	February 9, 2026	978-4-04-076270-8	—	—
17	August 7, 2026	978-4-04-076501-3	—	—

=== Other ===
In commemoration of the release of the series' fourth volume, three commercials featuring the cosplayer Iori Moe were released in March 2020.

== Reception ==
By August 2026, the series had over 1.9 million copies in circulation.

== See also ==
- Dead Tube, another manga series written by Mikoto Yamaguchi
- Tomodachi Game, another manga series conceptualized by Mikoto Yamaguchi
- Who Wants to Marry a Billionaire?, another manga series written by Mikoto Yamaguchi
