= Who Wants to Marry a Billionaire? =

Japanese manga series

- First tankōbon volume cover

タマロワ ～100%金目当て 資産35億のイケメンを巡る訳アリ女達の玉の輿バトルロワイヤル～ (Tamarowa: 100% Kane Meate - Shisan 35-oku no Ikemen wo Meguru Wakeari Onnatachi no Tamanokoshi Batoru Rowaiyaru)
- Genre: Drama, harem
- Manga
- Written by: Mikoto Yamaguchi
- Illustrated by: Mario
- Published by: Kodansha
- English publisher: NA: Seven Seas Entertainment
- Imprint: Evening KC
- Magazine: Comic Days
- Original run: June 28, 2019 – January 21, 2022
- Volumes: 7
- icon

Who Wants to Marry a Billionaire? (Note: Japanese: タマロワ ～100%金目当て 資産35億のイケメンを巡る訳アリ女達の玉の輿バトルロワイヤル～, Hepburn: Tamarowa: 100% Kane Meate - Shisan 35-oku no Ikemen wo Meguru Wakeari Onnatachi no Tamanokoshi Batoru Rowaiyaru; lit. 'Tamarowa: The "Marry Into Riches" Battle Royale, Where Women With Special Circumstances Gather Around a Hunk and Aim for His Money With Their 100%') is a Japanese web manga series written by Mikoto Yamaguchi and illustrated by Mario. It was serialized on Kodansha's Comic Days online platform from June 2019 to January 2022, with its chapters collected in seven tankōbon volumes.

== Premise ==
Facing significant debt and social isolation at age 30, a reclusive NEET named Yuuna Goto devises a plan for financial solvency by participating in the reality television program Who Wants to Marry a Billionaire?, a competition where participants vie for a matrimonial union with a wealthy individual. Despite perceiving herself as an underdog lacking in conventional attributes or social capital, she is determined to outperform other contestants to achieve her objective of securing the grand prize.

== Publication ==
Written by Mikoto Yamaguchi and illustrated by Mario, Who Wants to Marry a Billionaire? was serialized on Kodansha's Comic Days online platform from June 28, 2019, to January 21, 2022. Kodansha collected its chapters in seven tankōbon volumes, released from November 13, 2019, to March 9, 2022.

In North America, Seven Seas Entertainment licensed the manga, publishing it under its Ghost Ship adult imprint in both print and digital formats. The seven volumes were released from December 14, 2021, to March 12, 2024.

=== Volumes ===
No.	Original release date	Original ISBN	English release date	English ISBN
1	November 13, 2019	978-4-06-517264-3	December 14, 2021	978-1-64-827790-0
2	March 11, 2020	978-4-06-518913-9	April 5, 2022	978-1-63858-153-6
3	August 11, 2020	978-4-06-520483-2	June 21, 2022	978-1-63858-325-7
4	December 9, 2020	978-4-06-522119-8	January 3, 2023	978-1-63858-741-5
5	April 14, 2021	978-4-06-522680-3	June 13, 2023	978-1-63858-973-0
6	September 8, 2021	978-4-06-525070-9	October 17, 2023	978-1-68579-592-4
7	March 9, 2022	978-4-06-526645-8	March 12, 2024	979-8-88843-420-8

== See also ==
- Dead Tube, another manga series written by Mikoto Yamaguchi
- Game of Familia, another manga series written by Mikoto Yamaguchi
- Tomodachi Game, another manga series conceptualized by Mikoto Yamaguchi
