= Nagi Nemoto =

Japanese singer

- 根本 凪
- Born: 15 March 1999 (age 27)
- Occupations: Singer-songwriter; actress; VTuber
- Years active: 2014–present
- Notable work: Tomodachi Game as Yutori Kokorogi
- Musical career
- Label: DearStage
- Member of: Kiyoshi Ryujin 25
- Formerly of: Niji no Conquistador; Dempagumi.inc
- Years active: 2020–present

YouTube information
- Channel: nemotonagi
- Genre: music
- Subscribers: 31,000
- Views: 1,186,111
- Last updated: 3 July 2022

Nagi Nemoto (根本 凪, Nemoto Nagi; born 15 March 1999) is a Japanese singer-songwriter, actress, and VTuber, affiliated with DearStage. After becoming interested in Dempagumi.inc, she later joined Niji no Conquistador in 2014 and eventually Dempagumi.inc itself in 2017, remaining with both of them until 2022. She began working as a VTuber that year, has released two EPs: Lume di Spica (2022) and Due Stelle (2023), and joined Kiyoshi Ryujin 25 in 2024. She has also done some work in acting, including a starring role as Yutori Kokorogi in the 2017 drama adaptation of Tomodachi Game, as well as in songwriting, gravure modeling and costume design.

== Biography ==
=== Early life and idol career ===
Nagi Nemoto was born on 15 March 1999. She originally worked in her native Mito, Ibaraki as a local idol. After dealing with issues with physical and mental health, as well as school absences, she talked with a counselor, subsequently recovered, and became interested in Dempagumi.inc. She later participated in an audition held by Dempagumi.inc producer Maiko Fukushima, and she became one of the founding members of Niji no Conquistador in 2014. On 30 December 2017, she was announced as a new member of Dempagumi.inc, though she remained with Niji no Conquistador afterwards. In 2019, she and Dempagumi.inc member Rin Kaname formed the unit Nemopero from Dempagumi.inc.

In 2015, Nemoto started collaborating with Mikeneko Homeless, and in June 2016 they collaborated for a limited-time release from Maltine Records with four songs featuring her, one of which was her first solo song release "Purity". She collaborated with Yukichi Kasaku/men, who wrote, composed, and arranged her solo song "Yume wo Miru" in the First Limited Edition B of Dempagumi.inc's 2020 album Ai ga Chikyū Sukuunsa! Datte Dempagumi.inc wa Family desho, as well as "Taberareru/Taberanai?", which the two performed under the unit Middle Estate in the former's 2021 EP HoruAssort.

In 2016, Nemoto won the fifth edition of the Sakidol Ace Survival gravure idol auditions, and she appeared on the cover and lead photo spread of the 4 August 2016 issue of Weekly Young Jump, the auditions' organizer. She later became active as a gravure idol but was less active by the following year, admitting this was a "life crisis". On 25 February 2020, she and Kaname released the photo book Nemopero (ねもぺろ), conceived by fashion designer Kimura U; Modelpress said that "this work, which will be a precursor to the group's future activities, is one not to be missed". In 2024, she appeared in some issues of Weekly Spa!.

In 2017, Nemoto starred as Yutori Kokorogi in the drama adaptation of Tomodachi Game. She and other members of Niji no Conquistador appeared in Yamaha Tricity's 2017 "Sauna to Tricity de Totonotta" commercial, and she and Kaname appeared in the music video of Yuzu's 2021 song "Imasara". In April 2020, she began broadcasting her radio show Nemoto Nagi no Shakariki Gojappe Radio (根本凪のシャカリキごじゃっぺラジオ; lit. Nagi Nemoto's Frantic and Careless Radio) on LuckyFM Ibaraki Broadcasting System.

=== Post-Niji no Conquistador career ===
On 30 October 2021, Nemoto announced that she would be taking a hiatus due to health issues, canceling several planned appearances and events. On 11 January 2022, she announced that she would be permanently leaving both of her idol groups, with her ill health making any continuance with Niji no Conquistador impractical, but would remain with DearStage as an illustrator and costume designer. Her final appearances with Niji no Conquistador and Dempagumi.inc were on 17 and 30 April, respectively, and she unveiled her VTuber persona on a cathode-ray tube television set at the latter event.

Despite no longer being a member of Niji no Conquistador, Nemoto was the lyricist and costume designer for their 2022 song "Boku wa Kimi dake no Obake-chan". Nemoto has also worked as costume designer for Rirunade.

On 30 September 2022, Nemoto released her first solo EP, Lume di Spica. In February 2023, she made her first non-VTuber stage performance since last year at VALIS's "Hitsuzen-teki Raison d'être" live event. A second EP, Due Stelle, was released on 15 October 2023. On 7 July 2024, it was announced that she would be the 103rd "wife" of the polygamy unit Kiyoshi Ryujin 25, named Nagi Kiyoshi (清 凪, Kiyoshi Nagi).

== Discography ==
=== Albums ===
Both album titles are stylized in low-caps.

Title	Year	Details	Peak chart positions	Sales	Ref.
Title	Year	Details	JPN	Sales	Ref.
Lume di Spica	2022	Released: 30 September 2022	—	—	
Due Stelle	2023	Released: 15 October 2023; Formats: CD, digital	—	—	

=== Songwriting credits ===
All songs are written solely by Nemoto.

Song	Artist(s)	Album(s)	Year	Ref.
"Boku wa Kimi dake no Obake-chan"	Niji no Conquistador	Single-first	2022	
"Coffee Spicata!"	Nagi Nemoto	Lume di Spica	2022	
"Great Summer"	Nagi Nemoto	Due Stelle	2023	
"I Lovin' You No Future!"	Nagi Nemoto	Due Stelle	2023	
"Xoxo Soda"	Nagi Nemoto	Lume di Spica	2022	

== Filmography ==
- Tomodachi Game (2017), Yutori Kokorogi
- Yamaha Tricity "Sauna to Tricity de Totonotta" commercial (2017)
- Nemoto Nagi no Shakariki Gojappe Radio (2020), host
- Yuzu's "Imasara" music video (2021)
