= Tomodachi Game =

Japanese manga series

- First tankōbon volume cover, featuring Yūichi Katagiri

トモダチゲーム (Tomodachi Gēmu)
- Genre: Psychological thriller
- Manga
- Written by: Mikoto Yamaguchi; Yuki Sato
- Illustrated by: Yuki Sato
- Published by: Kodansha
- English publisher: Kodansha
- Magazine: Bessatsu Shōnen Magazine
- Original run: December 9, 2013 – August 8, 2024
- Volumes: 26
- Television drama
- Directed by: Jiro Nagae
- Written by: Jiro Nagae; Sagami Yoshitsugu
- Music by: Kuniyuki Morohashi
- Studio: Canter
- Original network: Chiba TV, Teletama, Hokkaido TV, tvk, Kyushu Asahi Broadcasting, Sun TV, KBS Kyoto, Mētele
- Original run: April 3, 2017 – April 24, 2017
- Episodes: 4
- Live-action film

Tomodachi Game Gekijō-ban
- Directed by: Jiro Nagae
- Written by: Jiro Nagae; Sagami Yoshitsugu
- Music by: Kuniyuki Morohashi
- Released: June 3, 2017
- Live-action film

Tomodachi Game Gekijō-ban Final
- Directed by: Jiro Nagae
- Written by: Jiro Nagae; Sagami Yoshitsugu
- Music by: Kuniyuki Morohashi
- Released: September 2, 2017
- Anime television series
- Directed by: Hirofumi Ogura
- Written by: Kenta Ihara
- Music by: Michiru
- Studio: Okuruto Noboru
- Licensed by: Crunchyroll; SEA: Medialink
- Original network: Nippon TV, BS NTV, AT-X
- Original run: April 6, 2022 – June 22, 2022
- Episodes: 12
- Television drama

Tomodachi Game R4
- Directed by: Takurō Oikawa; Hajime Takezono; Toshiaki Kamada
- Written by: Takuji Higuchi; Shinya Hokimoto
- Music by: Yoshinori Nakamura
- Original network: ANN (TV Asahi)
- Original run: July 23, 2022 – September 10, 2022
- Episodes: 8
- icon

Tomodachi Game (Japanese: トモダチゲーム, Hepburn: Tomodachi Gēmu; lit. 'Friends Game') is a Japanese manga series conceptualized by Mikoto Yamaguchi and written and illustrated by Yuki Sato. It was serialized in Kodansha's shōnen manga magazine Bessatsu Shōnen Magazine from December 2013 to August 2024, with its chapters collected in 26 tankōbon volumes. A television drama adaptation and two live-action films premiered in 2017. An anime television series adaptation produced by Okuruto Noboru aired from April to June 2022. A second television drama adaptation titled Tomodachi Game R4 aired on TV Asahi from July to September 2022.

== Premise ==
Yūichi Katagiri was taught the value of friendship when he was young, and it is thanks to his group of four friends that he is able to enjoy high school life today. When their class's school trip funds are stolen, the five are dragged into the mysterious Tomodachi Game as a result of someone's debt. The friendship of the five will be put to the ultimate test against the promise of wealth there.

== Characters ==
=== Group C ===
Yūichi Katagiri (片切友一, Katagiri Yūichi)
Voiced by: Chiaki Kobayashi (Japanese); David Matranga (English)
Portrayed by: Ryo Yoshizawa, Hidaka Ukisho (R4)
A seemingly ordinary high school student from a poor family who is forced to participate in the Tomodachi Game to pay off a collective debt. Throughout the games, a ruthless and manipulative side of his personality emerges, showcasing his formidable talent for deciphering rules and manipulating opponents. Yūichi possesses a dark past, having killed his two adopted parents. Despite later revelations that he originally conceived the Tomodachi Game as a child, he now seeks to destroy its administration.
Shiho Sawaragi (沢良宜志法, Sawaragi Shiho)
Voiced by: Yume Miyamoto (Japanese); Caitlin Glass (English)
Portrayed by: Rio Uchida, Sayu Kubota (R4)
One of Yūichi's friends participates in the Tomodachi Game alongside him. Raised with a strong sense of morality by her policeman father, she is well-liked among her peers and has a crush on Yūichi. Having accidentally lost their class's trip funds, she inadvertently paid the admission fee for their game. After being released from the second round, she is bullied by classmates out of suspicion and hatred, leading to her disappearance. She reappears as a hostage after her father investigates the game, later rejoining as a participant to find the truth behind the Tomodachi Game and learn about Yūichi's past.
Tenji Mikasa (美笠天智, Mikasa Tenji)
Voiced by: Daiki Hamano (Japanese); Josh Bangle (English)
Portrayed by: Yuki Yamada, Ryūga Satō (R4)
One of Yūichi's friends participates in the Tomodachi Game alongside him. He is calm, reserved, and brilliant, often achieving top marks in school and demonstrating strong capabilities in negotiation and mediation. It is revealed he participated in the Tomodachi Game before, accumulating debt from a past betrayal by friends. He originally bore great hatred for his childhood friend, whom he blamed for that betrayal and his father's death, intending to use the current game to demoralize her. After learning the truth behind his father's death, their relationship is restored. Following the second round, he accompanies Yūichi for the remainder of the games, winning his trust.
Makoto Shibe (四部誠, Shibe Makoto)
Voiced by: Tomohiro Ōno (Japanese); Aaron Campbell (English)
Portrayed by: Shimon Okura, Mizuki Inoue (R4)
One of Yūichi's friends participates in the Tomodachi Game alongside him. The son of a politician, he grew up without financial worry and possesses a carefree, honest personality. After being released from the second round, he is bullied by classmates out of suspicion and hatred. When asking his father for money, he is instead accused of murdering him and the attempted sexual assault of another participant. He joins the third round to prove his innocence in stealing the class trip funds. After having his name cleared, he inherits his father's debt and follows Yūichi into the Adult Tomodachi Game. However, upon learning Yūichi's role in his father's financial corruption, he ultimately betrays him.
Yutori Kokorogi (心木ゆとり, Kokorogi Yutori)
Voiced by: Satomi Amano (Japanese); Dani Chambers (English)
Portrayed by: Nagi Nemoto, Mayuu Yokota (R4)
One of Yūichi's friends participates in the Tomodachi Game alongside him. She is initially kind, timid, and highly gullible, with a genuine interest in manga. Following her release from the second round, she joins Yūichi for all subsequent games. Her past involves extreme bullying and claims of having "worked as a prostitute" without conducting night service. A far more cunning and wicked side is revealed, including secret dealings with figures from Yūichi's past, whom she met before high school. She is responsible for the murder of another participant's father to frame Sawaragi, executing this as part of her plan to force everyone into the Tomodachi Game.
Kei Shinomiya (紫宮京, Shinomiya Kei)
Voiced by: Kensho Ono (Japanese); Derick Snow (English)
Portrayed by: Naoki Fujii (R4)
The shortest member of Group K appears to be its most innocent but is actually the mastermind behind its near-victory in Hide-and-Seek. A genius who rivals Yūichi, he joins the Adult Tomodachi Game specifically to challenge and defeat him in mental combat. After being bested by Yūichi in Friend's Prison, he joins Group C. Upon gaining the team's trust, Yūichi acknowledges him as a comrade, and the two assist each other during the All-Bet Gambling event.

=== Tomodachi Game Administration ===
==== Administrators and Observers ====
Maria Mizuse (水瀬マリア, Mizuse Maria)
Voiced by: Reina Ueda (Japanese); Sara Ragsdale (English)
Portrayed by: Yuki Katayama (R4)
She joins the third game under the guise of having advanced to this stage alone but joins Group C. In truth, she is one of the administrators of the Tomodachi Game, sent to spy on Yuichi. A very cheery and sly girl, Maria is in charge of observing Yuichi and hindering other participants in various games when needed. She later develops a crush on Yuichi finding his face and personality when he is ruthless and merciless charming.
Tsukino (月野)
Voiced by: Shizuka Itō (Japanese); Monica Rial (English)
A buxom administrator with short, blue hair covering the right half of her face. Usually in charge of observing Yuichi.
Reiko Tamai (玉井レイコ, Tamai Reiko)
Voiced by: Nana Mizuki (Japanese); Molly Searcy (English)
A buxom administrator with long, blonde hair. Initially introduced as the administrator in charge of observing Group K for Game #3: Friendly Hide and Seek, but is usually in charge of monitoring Kei Shinomiya specifically. Nicknamed "Tama-chan" by those close to her.

==== Manabu Variants ====
Manabu-kun (マナブくん)
Voiced by: Minami Takayama (Japanese); Kiba Walker (English)
A mascot character from a popular in-universe anime series, Manabu-kun is the host to the various games, and usually dresses up in disguises to fit the game's theme. He will introduce the games, explain the rules and whatever else this particular game requires. However, he never directly interferes with the players unless necessary.
Manabu-sensei (マナブ先生)
Voiced by: Chafurin (Japanese); Larry Brantley (English)
Manabu's disguise for Tomodachi Game #2: Kageguchi Sugoroku.
Manabu-gunso (グンソウ マナブ)
Manabu's disguise for Tomodachi Game #3: Friendship Hide-And-Seek
Manabu Saibankan (マナブサイバンカン)
Manabu's disguise for Tomodachi Game #4: Friend's Sin Trial
Manabu Hakushaku (マナブ ハクシャク)
Manabu's disguise for the banquet-style event that takes place directly before Adult Tomodachi Game #1: Friend's Prison Game
Manabu Shochō Rōyakan (マナブ ショチョウ ロウヤカンサマ)
Manabu's disguise for Adult Tomodachi Game #1: Friend's Prison Game

=== Tomodachi Game Participants ===
==== Group K ====
Jūzō Kadokura (門倉十蔵, Kadokura Jūzō)
Voiced by: Tetsu Inada (Japanese); Christopher Sabat (English)
Portrayed by: Taishō Iwasaki (R4)
The leader of Group K volunteers to be the hider during Friendly Hide and Seek. After dropping out of school to help his family's business, he enters his team into the Tomodachi Game as a last chance to win the national high school basketball tournament and settle a large debt. Following the conclusion of the third game, he is supposed to participate in the Adult Tomodachi Game but is implied to have disappeared. It is later revealed that he is alive and that another participant took his place in the game.
Hyakutarō Onigawara (鬼瓦百太郎, Onigawara Hyakutarō)
Voiced by: Kishō Taniyama (Japanese); Orion Pitts (English)
Portrayed by: Sōya Igari (R4)
The hothead of Group K who has a very kind heart and is also quick to violence.
Chisato Hashiratani (柱谷千聖, Hashiratani Chisato)
Voiced by: Tetsuya Kakihara (Japanese); Ricco Fajardo (English)
Portrayed by: Issei Kanasashi (R4)
The playboy of Group K. Usually in charge of keeping Hyakutaro in check if he becomes emotional.
Banri Niwa (丹羽万里, Niwa Banri)
Voiced by: Daisuke Ono (Japanese); Dallas Reid (English)
Portrayed by: Yūto Nasu (R4)
The quiet member of Group K.

=== Adult Tomodachi Game Participants ===
==== Game #1: Friend's Prison ====
Kuroki (クロキ)
Voiced by: Jun Fukuyama (Japanese); Shawn Gann (English)
A thug who kidnapped Yutori and incited Yuichi to rescue her under the guise of a Tomodachi Game. After being threatened by Yuichi and subsequently arrested for posing as an administrator, Kuroki joined the Adult Tomodachi Game hoping to get revenge on Yuichi. Later, it is revealed that Yutori orchestrated her kidnapping and asked Kuroki to do so. His first name is presumably Satoru (さとる), according to his ex-girlfriend Minami.
Ryusei Taneda (種田 流星, Taneda Ryūsei)
A former host club and a playboy participating in the Friend's Prison game. He also cleared Tomodachi Game twice.
Minami Fudo (ふどみなみ, Fudou Minami)
Kuroki's ex-girlfriend and participant.
Saori Miyabe (宮部 沙織, Miyabe Saori)
A former Housekeeper of the Shibe Household who was forced to work for unknown reasons, she bore a great hatred to the Shibe family. She became the first witness during Shibe's trial game to vent her anger, but later regains Shibe's trust and faith and later become an ally to Yuichi during the prison game. It was also revealed she was Shibe's first love that inspire him to like the "big sister types".

==== Game #2.1: All-Bet Gambling ====
===== Team Kamishiro =====
Shinji Shiba (司馬真司)
The son of Taizen Shiba and Yuichi's adoptive older brother with a shady business who first appeared as an assistant to Kamishiro in the Gambling games. Raised by the same person who taught Yuichi, it was known he could be the strongest and the same level of genius as his own brother. It was known that he worked with Kokorogi at the past manipulating several events with her; which includes Sawaragi's capture in middle school, and the murder of Mikasa's father. It also implied that he was responsible for Sawaragi's large scar on her chest.
Saika Kamishiro (最下 神代)
The elderly leader of the Kamishiro Team who claims to have the "God Eye" for being able to see through the opponents trick.

===== Team Kaidou =====
Tsukasa Kaidou (司 街道)
A detective who infiltrated Tomodachi Game to investigate by participating with his group and daughter. He later works with Yuichi to end Tomodachi Game.
Satone Kaidou (里根 街道)
The daughter of Tsukasa Kaidou who has extraordinary senses.

===== Team Mishima =====
Mishima Yasushi (三島 や寿司)

=== Others ===
Taizen Shiba (芝 大全)
Voiced by: Hōchū Ōtsuka (Japanese); R. Bruce Elliott (English)
The father of Shinji Shiba and the adoptive father of Yuichi who was the one who taught him about the value of money over the world. He was revealed to be one of the three people Yuichi killed at the past.
Yuka Katagiri (床 カタギリ)
Voiced by: Hekiru Shiina (Japanese); Anastasia Muñoz (English)
Yuichi's adoptive mother who raised him to be a better person and taught him the value of friends over money. She was revealed to be one of the three people Yuichi killed at the past. But unlike with Taizen, Yuichi felt heavily remorse when killing Yuka.

== Media ==
=== Manga ===
Tomodachi Game, conceptualized by Mikoto Yamaguchi and illustrated by Yuki Sato, was serialized in Kodansha's shōnen manga magazine Bessatsu Shōnen Magazine from December 9, 2013, to August 8, 2024. Kodansha collected its chapters in 26 tankōbon volumes, released from April 9, 2014, to October 8, 2024.

In May 2023, Kodansha started publishing the series in English on their K Manga digital service.

==== Volumes ====
No.	Release date	ISBN
1	April 9, 2014	978-4-06-395051-9
2	July 9, 2014	978-4-06-395119-6
3	December 9, 2014	978-4-06-395255-1
4	April 9, 2015	978-4-06-395364-0
5	September 9, 2015	978-4-06-395474-6
6	February 9, 2016	978-4-06-395593-4
7	July 8, 2016	978-4-06-395703-7
8	December 9, 2016	978-4-06-395834-8
9	May 9, 2017	978-4-06-395946-8
10	October 6, 2017	978-4-06-510240-4
11	March 9, 2018	978-4-06-511063-8
12	August 9, 2018	978-4-06-512321-8
13	January 9, 2019	978-4-06-513865-6
14	June 7, 2019	978-4-06-515300-0
15	December 9, 2019	978-4-06-517469-2
16	August 7, 2020	978-4-06-520320-0
17	December 9, 2020	978-4-06-521671-2
18	June 9, 2021	978-4-06-523413-6
19	November 9, 2021	978-4-06-525936-8
20	April 8, 2022	978-4-06-527513-9
21	October 7, 2022	978-4-06-529398-0
22	April 7, 2023	978-4-06-530913-1
23	August 8, 2023	978-4-06-532591-9
24	December 7, 2023	978-4-06-533941-1
25	May 9, 2024	978-4-06-535518-3
26	October 8, 2024	978-4-06-537018-6

=== TV drama ===
A four-episode television drama adaptation was broadcast on Chiba TV from April 3–24, 2017. It also aired on Teletama, Hokkaido TV, tvk, Kyushu Asahi Broadcasting, Sun TV, KBS Kyoto, and Mētele and was streamed on GYAO!. It was directed by Jiro Nagae, with screenplays by Nagae and Sagami Yoshitsugu, and Kuniyuki Morohashi composing the music.

In June 2022, another television drama adaptation produced by TV Asahi, titled Tomodachi Game R4, was announced. It was directed by Takurо̄ Oikawa, Hajime Takezono, and Toshiaki Kamada, with screenplays by Takuji Higuchi and Shinya Hokimoto, and Yoshinori Nakamura composing the music. The series features members of the Johnny's Jr. boybands, HiHi Jets and Bishonen as cast members. It was broadcast for eight episodes on TV Asahi from July 23 to September 10, 2022.

=== Live-action films ===
Two live-action films, Tomodachi Game Gekijō-ban (トモダチゲーム 劇場版) and Tomodachi Game Gekijō-ban Final (トモダチゲーム 劇場版 FINAL), premiered in Japan on June 3 and September 2, 2017, respectively.

=== Anime ===
In November 2021, it was announced that the series would receive an anime television series adaptation by Okuruto Noboru. It is directed by Hirofumi Ogura and written by Kenta Ihara, with Satomi Miyazaki designing the characters, Michiru composing the music, and Hiroto Morishita directing the sound at Studio Mausu. The series aired from April 6 to June 22, 2022, on NTV's AnichU programming block and other channels. (Note: Nippon TV lists the series premiere at 25:29 on April 5, 2022, which is effectively 1:29 a.m. JST on April 6.) The opening theme song is "Double Shuffle" by Nana Mizuki, while the ending theme song is "Tomoshibi" by saji. Crunchyroll streamed the series outside of Asia. Medialink licensed the series in Southeast Asia and began streaming it exclusively on Disney+/Disney+ Hotstar in May 2022.

An English dub by Crunchyroll premiered on April 19, 2022.

==== Episodes ====
No.	Title	Directed by (Note: Information is taken from the ending credits of each episode.)	Written by	Storyboarded by	Original release date (Note: Episodes are released every Wednesday at 12:00 a.m. JST on Hulu Japan, d Anime Store and other streaming platforms, an hour and 29 minutes before the original air time on NTV.)
1	"Huh? Yuichi-kun Suspects His Friends?"; Transliteration: "Are? Yūichi-kun wa Tomodachi o Utagatteru no?" (Japanese: あれ？友一君は友達を疑ってるの？)	Yumeko Iwaoka	Kenta Ihara	Hirofumi Ogura	April 6, 2022
2	"You Have a Lot to Say to Me, Don't You?"; Transliteration: "Aru Desho, Hanashitai Koto ga Iroiro..." (Japanese: あるでしょ、話したいことが色々…)	Tatsuya Sasaki	Kenta Ihara	Shinobu Sasaki	April 13, 2022
3	"There's No Way I'd Believe That"; Transliteration: "Sasuga ni Sore wa Shinjirarenaitte" (Japanese: さすがにそれは信じられないって)	Yoshinobu Kasai	Kenta Ihara	Kenta Ōnishi	April 20, 2022 (Note: This episode aired at 1:49 a.m. JST, 20 minutes after the original air time.)
4	"Seriously? That's So Cringe!"; Transliteration: "Kore Maji? Honki de Hikun da kedo" (Japanese: これマジ？本気で引くんだけど)	Keisuke Warita	Kenta Ihara	Keisuke Warita	April 27, 2022
5	"Yuichi-kun, You're Pretty Dumb, Aren't You?"; Transliteration: "Yūichi-kun tte Kekkō Baka Nan da ne" (Japanese: 友一君って結構バカなんだね)	Yumeko Iwaoka	Kenta Ihara	Yumeko Iwaoka	May 4, 2022
6	"I Really Can't Be Friends with a "Murderer""; Transliteration: "Yappari "Hitogoroshi" to wa Tomodachi ni Narenaitte" (Japanese: やっぱり“人殺し”とは友達になれないって)	Yūki Morita	Kenta Ihara	Yumeko Iwaoka; Hirofumi Ogura	May 11, 2022
7	"I'll Take 20 Million Yen Worth of Your Life"; Transliteration: "Nisenman'en-bun no Kimi no Jinsei o Morau kara ne" (Japanese: 2000万円分の君の人生をもらうからね)	Yūichi Abe	Kenta Ihara	Yūichi Abe	May 18, 2022 (Note: This episode aired at 2:19 a.m. JST, 50 minutes after the original air time.)
8	"It's a Game Where You Wait, and Wait, and Wait... and Keep Waiting"; Transliteration: "Matte Matte Matte... Machi Tsuzukeru Gēmu da yo" (Japanese: 待って待って待って…待ち続けるゲームだよ)	Yoshinobu Kasai	Kenta Ihara	Jin Tamamura	May 25, 2022
9	"Hurry Up and "Switch Sides""; Transliteration: "Sassato "Negaeri" Shiro yo" (Japanese: さっさと“寝返り”しろよ)	Tatsuya Sasaki	Kenta Ihara	Hirofumi Ogura	June 1, 2022 (Note: This episode aired at 1:34 a.m. JST, 5 minutes after the original air time.)
10	"The Third Game Is Over!"; Transliteration: "Daisan Gēmu Shūryō!" (Japanese: 第三ゲーム終了ーっ！)	Keisuke Warita	Kenta Ihara	Keisuke Warita	June 8, 2022
11	"Do You Really Have Nothing You Care About?"; Transliteration: "Kimi ni wa "Daiji na Mono" ga Naitte Hontō?" (Japanese: 君には“大事なもの”がないって本当？)	Noboru Koshihisa	Kenta Ihara	Yūichi Abe	June 15, 2022
12	"What's Most Important to Me Is..."; Transliteration: "Ore ni Totte Ichiban Taisetsu na no wa..." (Japanese: 俺にとって一番大切なのは…)	Yumeko Iwaoka; Keisuke Warita	Kenta Ihara	Yumeko Iwaoka; Hirofumi Ogura	June 22, 2022

== See also ==
- Dead Tube, another manga series written by Mikoto Yamaguchi
- Game of Familia, another manga series written by Mikoto Yamaguchi
- Who Wants to Marry a Billionaire?, another manga series written by Mikoto Yamaguchi
