= Graduate School of Management, Globis University =

Private university in Tokyo, Japan

Coordinates: 35°41′7.5″N 139°44′12.3″E

- グロービス経営大学院大学 (gurōbisu keiei daigakuin daigaku)
- Graduate School of Management, Globis University logo
- Former names: Globis Management School
- Motto: Japanese: 創造と変革
- Motto in English: Visionary Leaders who Create and Innovate Societies
- Type: Private business school
- Established: 1992; gained University Status from 2006
- Affiliations: Association of Asia-Pacific Business Schools
- President: Yoshito Hori
- Dean: Yoshihiko Takubo (Japanese MBA Program); Satoshi Hirose (English MBA Program)
- Academic staff: 149 (April 2024)
- Students: 2,525 (May 2024)
- Location: Chiyoda, Tokyo, Japan
- Campus: Tokyo, JP, Osaka, JP, Nagoya, JP, Fukuoka, JP, Sendai, JP, Yokohama, JP, Mito, JP, Singapore, SG, Bangkok, TH, San Francisco, USA, Brussels, BE
- Language: Japanese and English
- Alumni: 9,547 (May 2024)
- Website: www.globis.ac.jp

Graduate School of Management, Globis University (Japanese: グロービス経営大学院大学, Hepburn: gurōbisu keiei daigakuin daigaku; English: /ɡloʊbɪs/, commonly referred to and stylized as GLOBIS University) is a graduate business school with campuses in Tokyo, Osaka, Nagoya, Fukuoka, Sendai, Yokohama, and Mito in Japan and Singapore, Bangkok, San Francisco, and Brussels internationally. Globis University started as a private education venture, Globis Management School, in 1992 by Japanese entrepreneur Yoshito Hori, later gaining official university status in 2006. Globis University is Japan's largest graduate business school, with an annual intake of 1,100 MBA students and total enrolment of 2,525 students in 2024. The university offers part-time and online MBA degree programs in English or Japanese and a full-time degree MBA program in English.

== History ==
=== GLOBIS Management School ===
Globis Management School was established as a private, non-accredited business school in Tokyo by Globis Corporation and its founder Yoshito Hori in 1992. It would form the basis for the later establishment of Graduate School of Management, Globis University. Hori, while doing his MBA at Harvard Business School from 1989 until 1991, observed that entrepreneurs in the US had access to a business environment highly conducive to start-ups. Aiming to nurture a similar environment in Japan, he set out to create a business centered around an ecosystem of knowledge, people and capital.

Hori had initially approached his alma mater regarding opening a franchise in Japan but was turned down, leading to the establishment of an independent business school. A licensing agreement was made, however, allowing Harvard case studies to be used at GLOBIS Management School. The school started with 800,000 yen (about $7,000 USD) in capital and a single marketing course taught at a small rented classroom in Shibuya. Additional business subjects such as finance were soon introduced, all structured around the case study method, which was quite novel in Japan at the time.

In 1993 a campus in Osaka was opened. By 1996 the curriculum had been expanded to allow the establishment of a joint MBA program with the University of Leicester. The first part of the program consisted of classes taught by Globis Management School in Japanese at locations in Tokyo and Osaka or by correspondence. The second part of the program was provided in English by Leicester Business School by correspondence. The joint MBA program would continue until January 2008.

In 2003 the Graduate Diploma in Business Administration (GDBA) was launched, a non-degree program and predecessor to the MBA degree offered after university status was attained. GDBA was discontinued in 2013 with a total of 220 students having graduated.

=== University Status ===
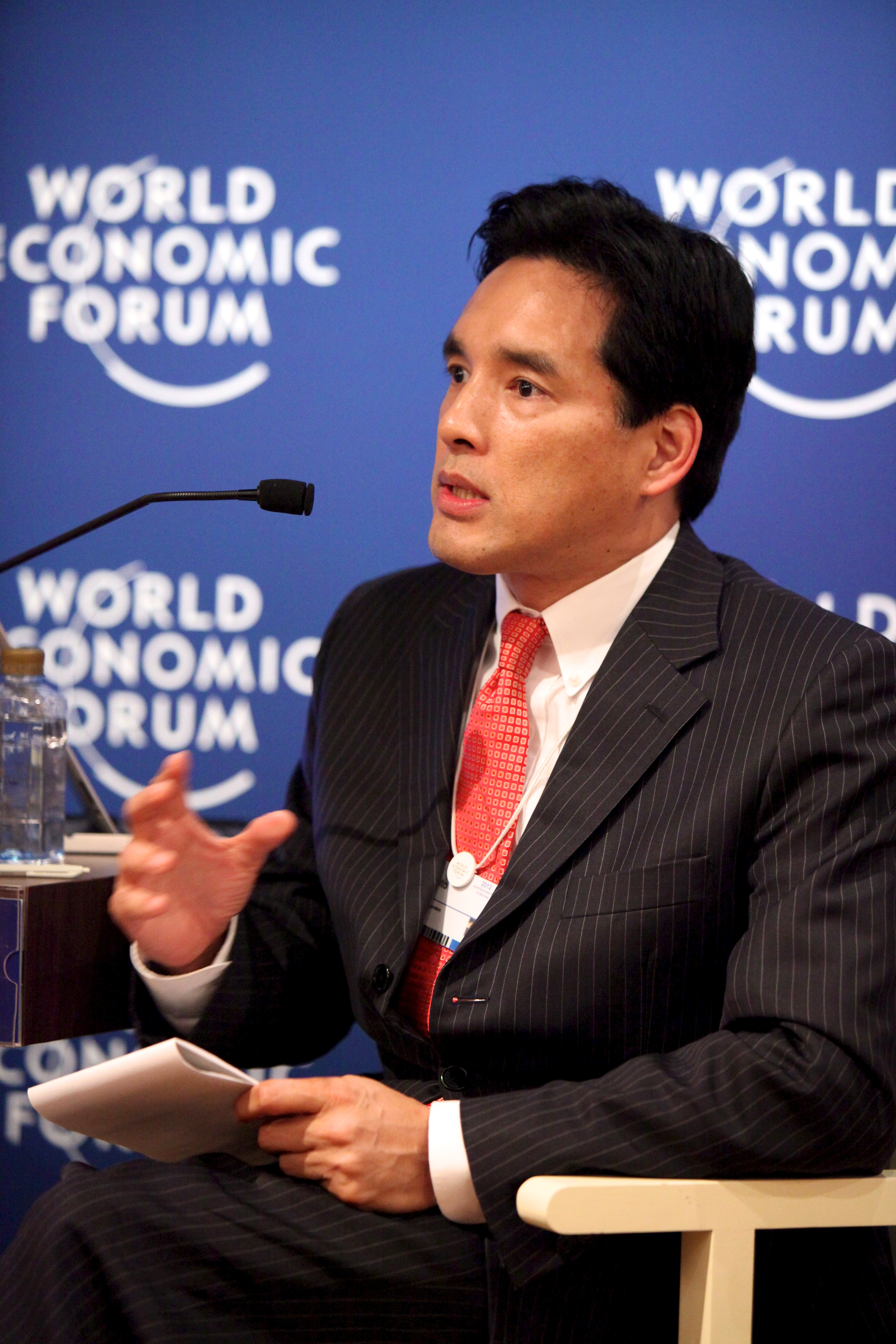
Yoshito Hori, the president and founder of Globis University and Globis Corporation, at World Economic Forum on East Asia 2012

Globis Management School was accredited in December 2005 as a for-profit university established by a private company (株式会社立大学, kabushiki gaisha ritsu daigaku). Provisions for the establishment of this type of university had been introduced as part of the Special Zones for Structural Reform Program (構造改革特別区域制度, kōzō kaikaku tokubetsu kuiki seido) previously in 2003. This led to the establishment of the Graduate School of Management, Globis University in April 2006. That same year, university campuses in Tokyo and Osaka were formally established.

However, in 2008 the decision was made to change the incorporation entity of Graduate School of Management, Globis University to a non-profit incorporated educational institution (学校法人, gakkō hōjin) private university (私立大学, shiritsu daigaku). This entity type had traditionally been reserved for organizations with substantial funds and ownership of land for campus development, but became an option for universities established by private companies after MEXT introduced changes to requirements. Changing to an incorporated educational institution allowed Globis University to establish a fund supported by internal reserves and donations, enabling a more stable and long-term development of the educational environment and campus facilities.

=== Expansion ===
Further university campus locations were added in Nagoya in 2009, Sendai in 2012, Fukuoka in 2013, and Yokohama and Mito, Ibaraki in 2017. Outside of Japan campus locations were opened in Singapore in 2019, Bangkok in 2020, San Francisco in 2021, and Brussels in 2022.

== Campuses ==
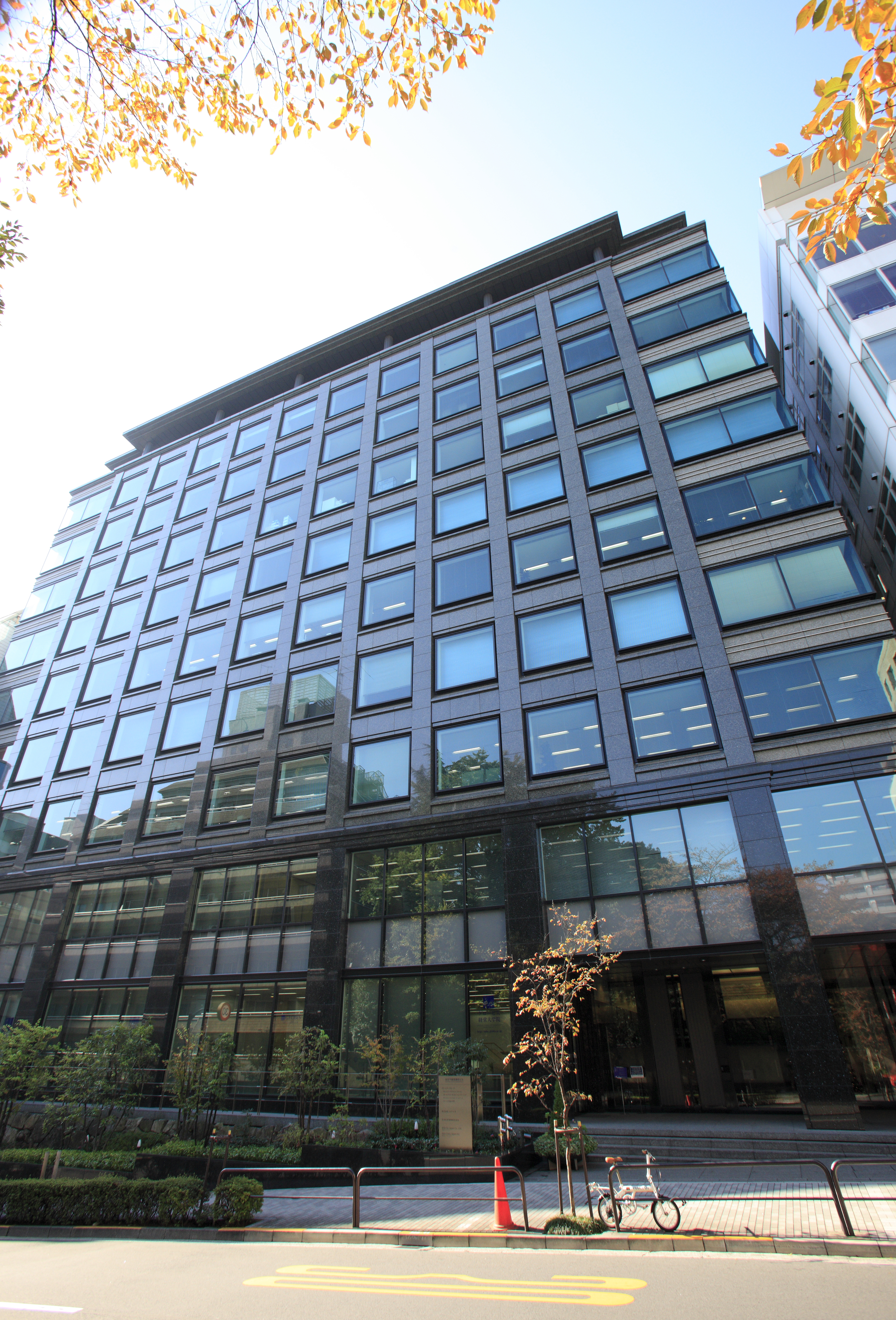
Globis Tokyo campus in Nibanchō

Globis University has five campuses in Tokyo, Osaka, Nagoya, Sendai, and Fukuoka and two satellite campuses (特設キャンパス, tokusetsu kyanpasu) in Yokohama and Mito, Ibaraki in Japan. The main campus is located near Kōjimachi Station in Banchō, Chiyoda in central Tokyo, which offers both Japanese and English-language MBA programs. The Osaka, Nagoya, Sendai, and Fukuoka campuses offer Japanese-language MBA programs. Satellite campuses in Yokohama and Mito only offer non-degree Pre-MBA courses in Japanese.

Outside of Japan Globis University offers non-degree English-language Pre-MBA courses at campus locations in Singapore, Bangkok, San Francisco, and Brussels.

== Academics ==
=== Academic programs ===
Globis University consists of a single graduate school of management. The university offers a one-year Full-time MBA degree program in English, which includes a 3-month professional internship, and two-year Part-time MBA and Online MBA degree programs in either Japanese or English. Preparatory non-degree Pre-MBA courses are also available in both Japanese and English, allowing credits to be transferred upon enrollment in the MBA degree programs.

=== Accreditation ===
Globis University is fully accredited by the Japan University Accreditation Association (JUAA), Japan’s higher education accreditation board, under both university and business school categories.

=== Exchange Partners ===
Globis University has exchange programs with:

- CEIBS (China Europe International Business School)
- Chulalongkorn Business School

== Student body ==
=== Enrolment ===
Annual Enrolment Numbers
	2006	2007	2008	2009	2010	2011	2012	2013	2014	2015	2016	2017	2018	2019	2020	2021	2022	2023
Japanese MBA	78	103	128	194	278	321	373	468	575	659	717	782	825	902	1,095	1,126	1,158	1,068
English MBA	0	0	0	29	23	27	64	63	54	70	82	89	96	91	82	104	96	115
Total	78	103	128	223	301	348	437	531	629	729	799	871	921	993	1,177	1,230	1,254	1,183

In May 2024, the university had a total enrolment of 2,525 graduate students, with 200 students in the English MBA and 2,325 students in the Japanese MBA.

== Notable people ==
=== Alumni ===
- Eri Machii, Founder/CEO AfriMedico
- Jun Suzuki, Japanese former football player
- Mihoko Suzuki, Co-founder Taskaji
- Miko Tan, Co-founder TeamRed
- Ritsuko Pooh, Japanese obstetrician and gynecologist
- Wilson Chan, CEO Buyandship

=== Faculty ===
- James Abegglen
- Yoshito Hori, President
