= Shintaro Yamada (businessman) =

Japanese businessman

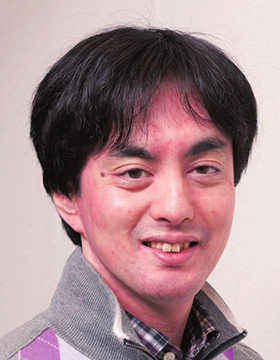
- Born: 1977 or 1978 (age 48–49)
- Education: Waseda University
- Occupation: Businessman
- Known for: Founder, CEO and 1/3 owner of Mercari

Shintaro Yamada (Japanese: 山田 進太郎, Hepburn: Yamada Shintarō; born 1977/1978) is a Japanese businessman, and the founder, CEO and one-third owner of the online marketplace Mercari.

== Early life ==
Yamada earned a degree in mathematics from Waseda University.

== Career ==
His first job after college was as an intern at Rakuten, then a little-known e-commerce company, for whom he developed an auction website.

In 2001, he founded Unoh, a games company, that was bought by Zynga in 2010.

Yamada became a billionaire following Mercari's IPO in June 2018.
