= Ritsuko Pooh =

Japanese obstetrician and gynecologist

Ritsuko Kimata Pooh
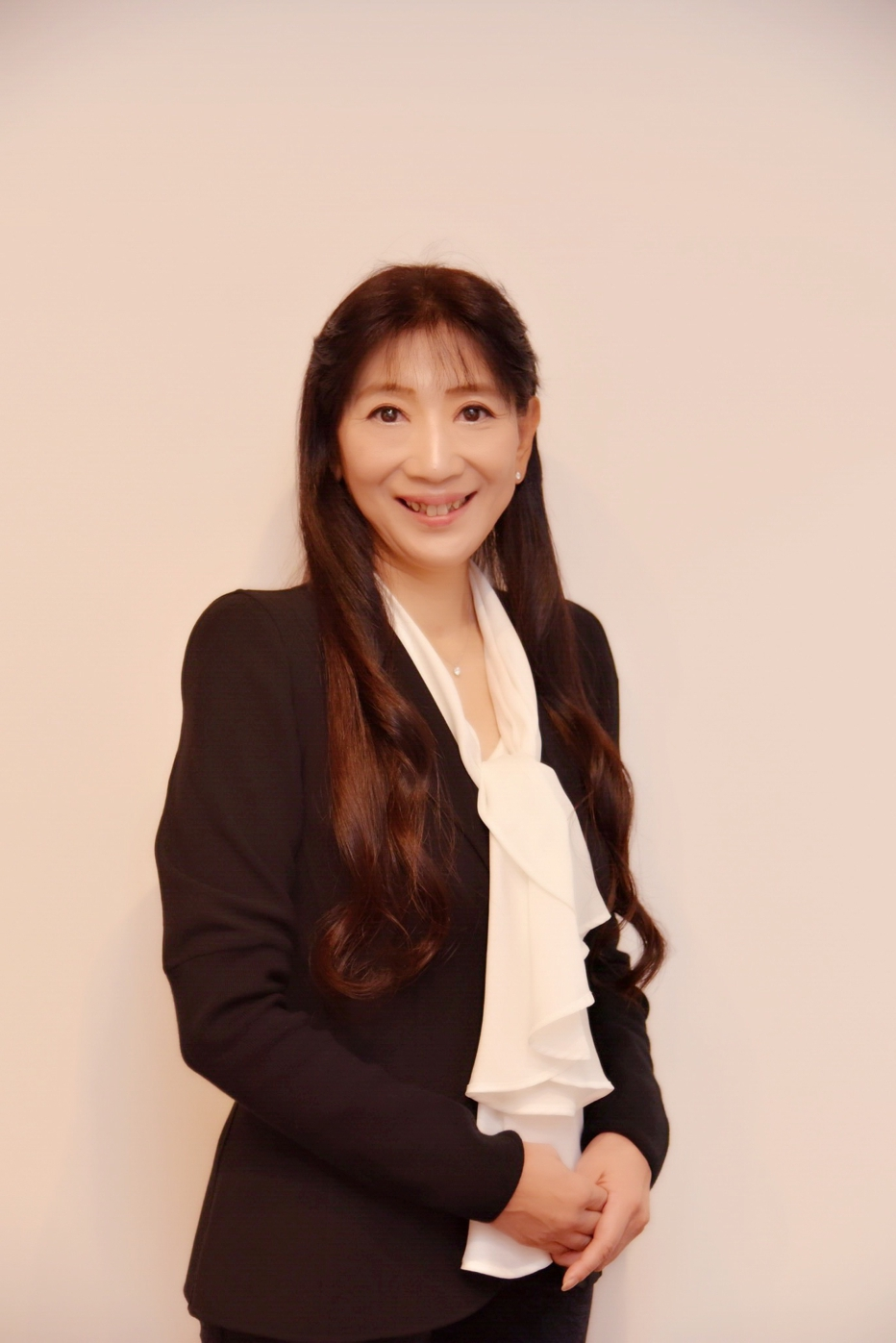
- Born: Hyogo, Japan
- Education: Keio University (LL.B.), Tokushima University (M.D, PhD), Chinese University Hong Kong (MSc), Graduate School of Management, Globis University (MBA)
- Alma mater: Law Department of Keio University; Medical School of Tokushima University
- Awards: Alfred Kratochwil Award (2011, Los Angeles); Lifetime Achievement Award (2015, Madrid); Sir William Liley Award (2016, Tirana); Short Oral Presentation Award (2016, Rome)

Rituko Kimata Pooh is a Japanese obstetrician and gynecologist.

== Current positions ==
- President – Fetal Diagnostic Center, Fetal Brain Center, CRIFM Prenatal Medical Clinic, Osaka, Japan
- Adjunct professor – Wayne State University School of Medicine, Detroit, USA
- Honorary professor – Pirogov Russian National Research Medical University, Moscow, Russia
- Professor – Department of Health Science, Dubrovnik International University, Dubrovnik, Croatia
- Visiting professor – Juntendo University School of Medicine, Tokyo, Japan
- Visiting professor - St. Mariannna University School of Medicine, Kanagawa, Japan
- Guest professor - Osaka University, Osaka, Japan
- CEO – Ritz Medical Co., Ltd. Clinical Genetic Laboratory, Osaka, Japan

== Biography ==
Ritsuko Kimata Pooh was born in Osaka, Japan in 1960. She graduated from Law Department of Keio University, Tokyo, and graduated from Medical school of Tokushima University with social, legal and ethical viewpoints. After her graduation from Medical school in 1990, she has dedicated her most of time to clinical research and investigation on sonoembryology and sonogenetics in perinatology.

Pooh received the Alfred Kratochwil Award during the ISUOG congress in 2011, the Lifetime achievement award during the WCPM (World Congress in Perinatal Medicine) in 2015, and the Sir William Liley medal during the International Congress on Fetus as a Patient in 2016. She obtained an MBA from Graduate School of Management, Globis University in 2022.

== Awards ==
- Alfred Kratochwil Award, The International Society of Ultrasound in Obstetrics and Gynecology (2011, Los Angeles)
- Lifetime achievement award, World Association of Perinatal Medicine (2015, Madrid)
- Sir William Liley Award, The International Society of The Fetus as a Patient (2016, Tirana)
- Short Oral Presentation Award, 26th World Congress on Ultrasound in Obstetrics and Gynecology (2016, Rome) -Clinical significance of 3D HDlive silhouette/flow in neurosonoembryology and fetal neurosonography-
- "Magnificent achievements in the visualization of early human development" Award (2019, Istanbul)
- JSOG Congress Encouragement Award, Japan Society of Obstetrics and Gynecology (2020, Tokyo)
