= NHK Mito Broadcasting Station =

Public broadcaster in Mito, Japan

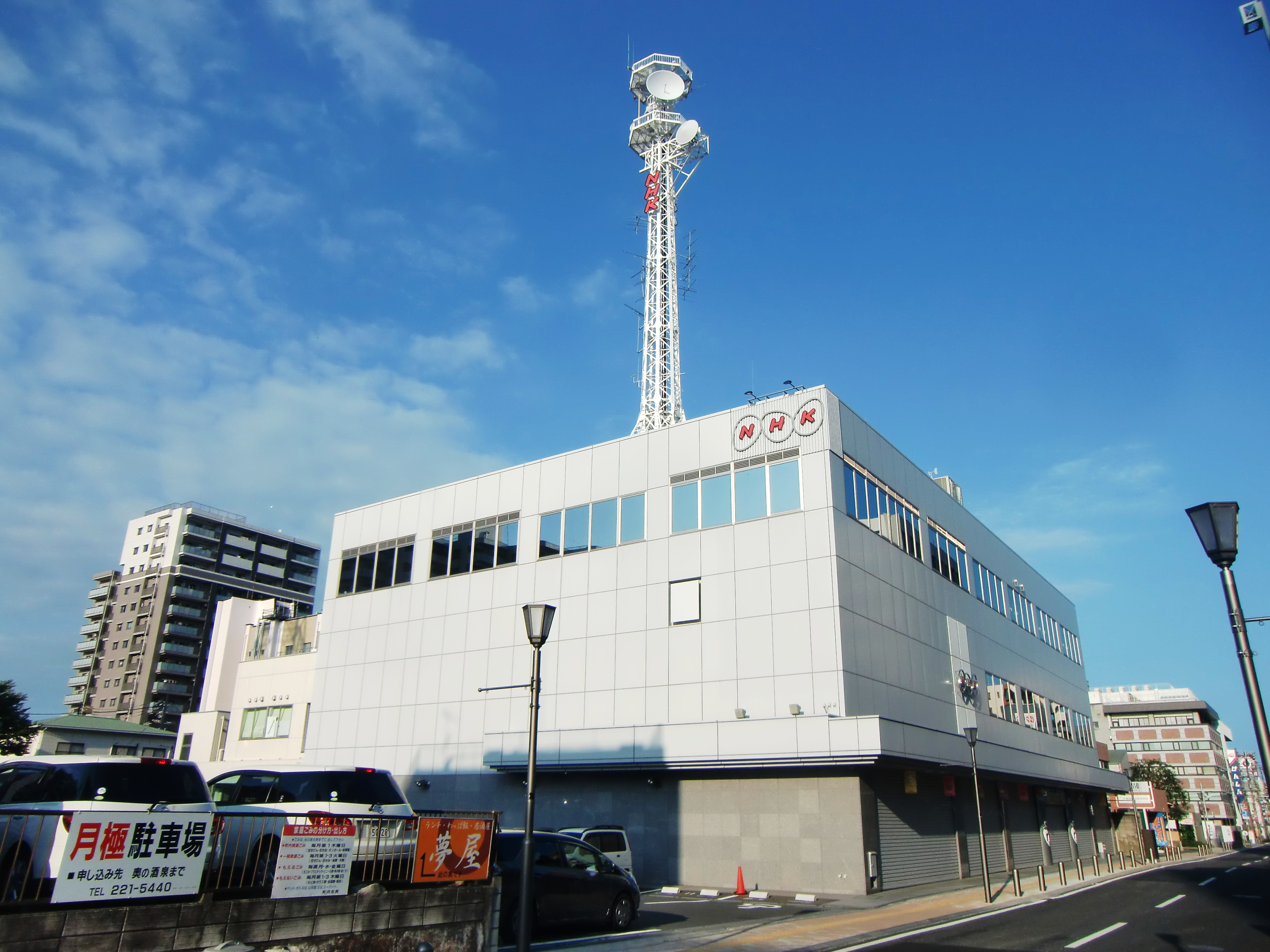
The station in July 2012

The NHK Mito Broadcasting Station (NHK水戸放送局, NHK Mito Hōsō Kyoku) is a unit of the NHK that oversees terrestrial broadcasting in Ibaraki Prefecture. Only NHK FM and NHK General TV have local versions, while Radio 1, Radio 2 and NHK E are served directly from the NHK Broadcasting Center in Tokyo.

The callsign used is JOEP.

== History ==
The Mito station set up its studios on December 9, 1941 and started AM radio broadcasts on April 10, 1942. After the war, on September 1, 1945, the station used the JOAK2 callsign; later, from July 1, 1948, JOAX (a few years later, Nippon Television adopted the callsign) until the station closed on August 16 that year.

On April 6, 1970, NHK-FM opened its station in Mito. With the advent of digital terrestrial television and the facilitation of the usage of a single frequency network, the station started broadcasting local television signals, detaching from the Tokyo station, on October 1, 2004. Until fiscal 2015, the station produced news bulletins every day, but due to budget cuts beginning in fiscal 2016, cuts started, before being limited to weekdays from 2018.

Television broadcasts are less likely to be received in the southern and western regions of the prefecture due to overspill from either the Utsunomiya or Tokyo stations. On September 5, 2011, weeks after the shutdown of analog television in Japan, the Tsukuba transmitting station became omnidirectional, improving its reception.
