= James Abegglen =

American business theorist (1926-2007)

- Born: James Christian Abegglen; February 15, 1926; Michigan, United States
- Died: May 2, 2007 (aged 81); Tokyo, Japan
- Citizenship: Japan

Academic background
- Education: University of Chicago (Ph.D.)

Academic work
- Discipline: Business theory
- Institutions: Sophia University

James Christian Abegglen (February 15, 1926 – May 2007) was an American and Japanese business theorist and professor in management and economics at Sophia University. He was one of the founders of the Boston Consulting Group (BCG) in 1963, and the first representative director of its Tokyo branch, founded in 1966.

== Early life and education ==
Abegglen was born in Michigan in 1926. During World War II, he served in the 3rd Marine Division to fight at Guadalcanal Island and Iwo Jima. When the war ended he was assigned to Strategic Bombing Survey (USSBS) as a researcher and returned to Japan. Following the war, Abegglen attended the University of Chicago, where he received his Ph.D. in anthropology and psychology. He earned a Ph.D. in economics from Harvard.

== Career ==
Abegglen revisited Japan in 1955 as a researcher of the Ford Foundation, to study Japanese industrial organization and personnel practices which led to the publication of his work The Japanese Factory. He served successively as professor and director of the Graduate School of Comparative Culture at Sophia University, chairperson of Asia Advisory Service K.K., and dean emeritus of Globis University in 2006. He taught "Management of Japanese Enterprises" at that school until his death from cancer on May 2, 2007.

== Work ==
Abegglen's academic interests centered on Japanese enterprises and economic systems and their priority to western capitalism.

=== The Japanese Factory ===
The Japanese Factory, published in 1958, pointed out the following features of employment and the strength of their mechanism in Japanese corporations:

- Lifetime employment: Employment extends over the whole working life of the employee
- Seniority-based wages: Compensation is determined by the number of years of employment in the company
- Periodic hiring: Employing young people fresh out of school
- In-company training: Employing workers based on personal qualities rather than job suitability, providing on-the-job training after hire
- Enterprise union: one labour union for each enterprise

== Publications ==
Abegglen authored and co-authored ten books on Japan. A selection:

- The Japanese Factory (1958)
- Big Business in America (1955)
- Kaisha, the Japanese Corporation (1985)
- Sea Change: Pacific Asia as the New World Industrial Center (Free Press: 1994)
- 21st Century Japanese Management: New Systems, Lasting Values (Palgrave Macmillan: 2006)

== Personal life ==
Abegglen lived permanently in Japan with his Japanese wife after 1982 and took Japanese nationality in 1997. He died of cancer on May 2, 2007, aged 81, in Tokyo, Japan.
