= Tochigi Broadcasting =

Radio station in Tochigi Prefecture, Japan

JOXF
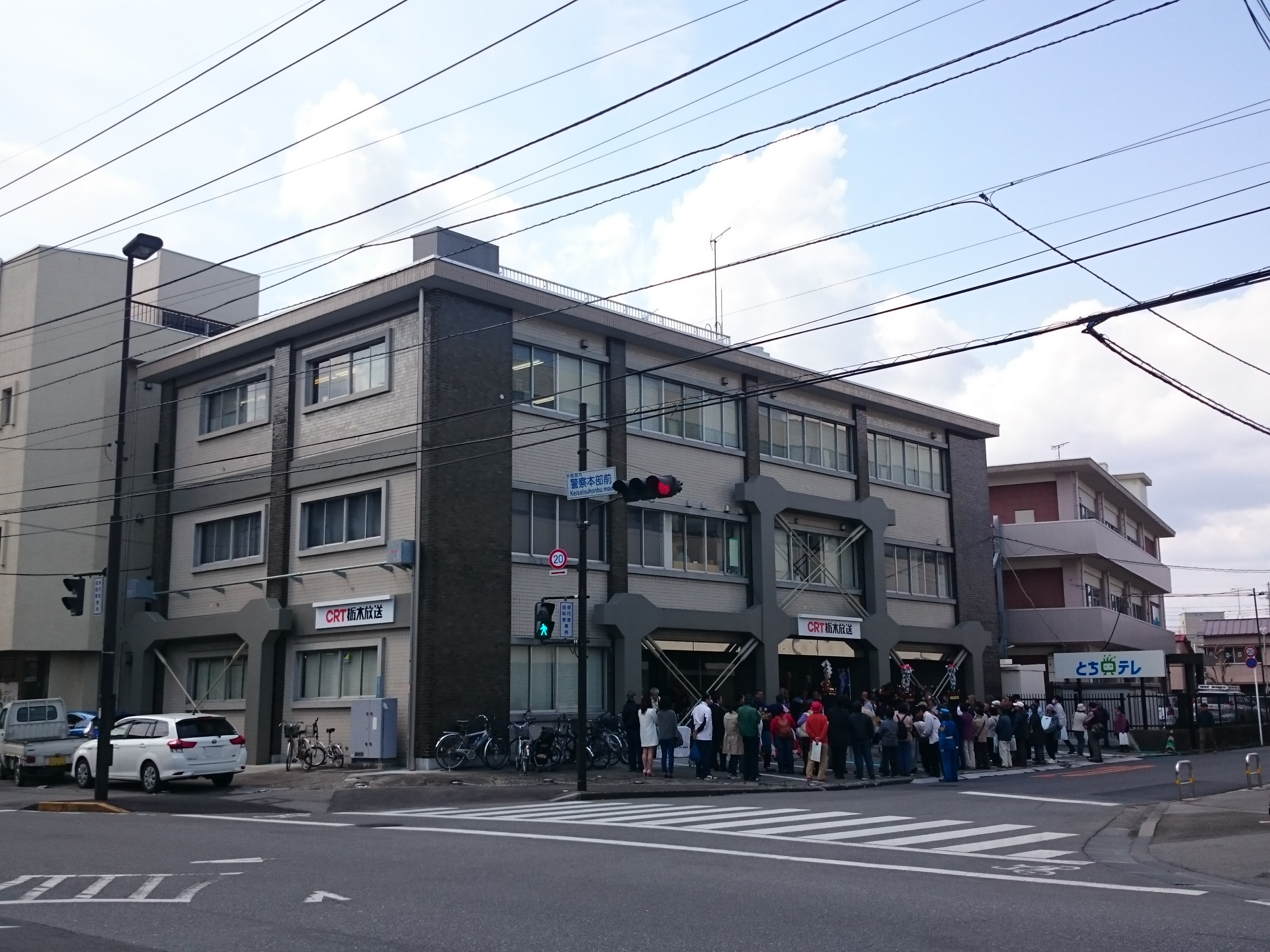
- Utsunomiya; Japan
- Broadcast area: Tochigi Prefecture
- Frequencies: 1530 kHz (AM); 94.1 MHz (FM)
- Branding: CRT; Tochigi Broadcasting

Programming
- Language: Japanese
- Format: Talk, Sports
- Affiliations: National Radio Network

Ownership
- Owner: Tochigi Broadcasting Co., Ltd.

History
- First air date: April 1, 1963; 63 years ago

Technical information
- Licensing authority: MIC

Links
- Website: https://www.crt-radio.co.jp

Tochigi Broadcasting (栃木放送, Tochigi Hōsō; CRT) is a Japanese radio station covering Tochigi Prefecture. It uses the JOXF calls and its name is derived from the initials of its former name, Company Radio Tochigi.

== History ==
The station started broadcasting on April 1, 1963 (simultaneously with Ibaraki Broadcasting System) on 1530kc (moved to 1062 kHz in 1978). It was initially independent before joining the National Radio Network in 1978.

On November 29, 2016, the Ministry of Internal Affairs and Communications began planning on subsidies to install an FM transmitter network for the station. A full license wasn't obtained until December 26, 2017, while regular broadcasts from the Utsunomiya FM station did not start until December 28. On August 1, 2018, the Ashikaga/Katsura FM relay station opened, followed by Imaichi on August 2 and Shiobara on August 3.

The system of the main AM station suffered a failure at 9:42pm on July 1, 2018, due to abnormal voltage, knocking it off the air. No anomaly was detected on its AM and FM relay stations. The problem was solved at 5:27am the following morning. A tripartite agreement with Radio Fukushima and IBS was signed on September 1, 2020, for joint collaboration regarding disasters and non-disaster content.
