= Quipper (company) =

British education technology company

- Industry: E-learning, Education
- Founded: 2010; 16 years ago in London
- Founder: Masayuki Watanabe; Fumihiro Yamaguchi (Founder and CEO)
- Headquarters: WeWork South Bank Central, London, United Kingdom
- Number of locations: four
- Area served: Japan; Indonesia; Philippines; Mexico
- Services: Study Sapuri; Sapuri English; Quipper School; Quipper School Premium; Quipper Video; Quipper Video Masterclass; Quipper Campus

Quipper is an education technology company that provides e-Learning, coaching, tutoring, and assessment services for K-12 in Japan, Indonesia, the Philippines, and Mexico. The company's primary service is an online learning management system (LMS), which is used in different ways in each country where it operates. The LMS contains locally developed content and is supplemented with additional services for teachers, students, school administrators, and other stakeholders in each country where it operates.

== Funding ==
Quipper raised £400K in its seed round from Atomico in 2011 and $3.6m (£2.3m) of Series A funding from Globis Capital Partners, Atomico, and Benesse in 2012. The company then received funding amounting to US$5.8 million from Atomico, Benesse Holdings, and Globis in 2015 before it was acquired 100% by the Japanese corporation Recruit Holdings for $39m in late 2015.

== History ==
In 2010, Japanese entrepreneur Masayuki Watanabe established Quipper in London. Prior to starting Quipper, he co-founded the social gaming company DeNA. At Quipper, he and his team developed Quipper School, an e-learning platform for teachers that provides ready-made content, automates administrative tasks, and delivers real-time data on student performance. The platform comprises portals for teachers, students, and parents, granting each party different levels of access. The company eventually established operations in Indonesia, the Philippines, and Mexico.

In 2010, another Japanese entrepreneur named Fumihiro "Bunyo" Yamaguchi from Recruit Holdings developed Juken Sapuri, an e-learning platform for examination preparation that streams videos featuring top teachers and also has text-based lessons and quizzes. Yamaguchi and Watanabe met in 2014, and in the spring of 2015, Recruit Holdings acquired Quipper, and in April 2017, Yamaguchi became Quipper CEO. Juken Sapuri was then migrated to the Quipper platform, and was renamed Study Sapuri. Indonesia, the Philippines, and Mexico also adopted the Study Sapuri content format and called the service Quipper Video.

== Quipper in Various Countries ==
=== Japan ===
Quipper's flagship service in Japan is called Study Sapuri ("Sapuri" is the Japanese term for "supplement”). There are two types of solutions under the Study Sapuri brand. The first is for students, which provides access to thousands of hours worth of video lessons from the country's top teachers. The second solution is for teachers, which includes an achievement test, a learning management system, and lectures taught step by step by professional tutors from prep schools.

Quipper also offers online coaching, which pairs students' access to Study Sapuri with coaching and tutoring services from teachers from some of the country's top universities. The objective of the service is to provide the guidance students need to pass the national exams to attend the university of their choice. After providing students with a year-long study plan based on their level, their coach then works with them to assist with the learning process and offer advice on their study habits.

The company also has a service called Sapuri English, which aims to help both students and professionals learn English. Courses range from junior high school English conversation, to TOEIC, to business English.

=== Indonesia ===
Quipper offers four services in Indonesia:

- Quipper School, an online learning management system for elementary, junior high, and high schools. The platform's main features are Q-Learn and Q-Link. Q-Learn is the student portal where students access their lessons and assignments while Q-Link is the teacher portal where teachers send assignments and access data on student performance. There's also a third portal called Q-Create, which enables teachers to create and upload their own content.
- Quipper Video, an e-learning solution with video streaming lessons for junior high and high school students designed to help them to prepare for exams, the national exam, and university enrollment tests. Students access Quipper Video through smart devices, where they can view videos, answer quizzes, and download notes.
- Quipper Video Masterclass, which has two main features - Ask Tutor and Online Guidance. The first is a live chat service that enables students to ask tutors for help with lessons, while the second provides students with a personal mentor to help them with their learning needs.
- Quipper Campus, an online platform for graduating students that helps them find information about higher education institutions. The platform can be accessed for free.

=== Philippines ===
Quipper Philippines also offers three services. The three services run on a single online platform, with the difference being the type of content available. They serve as learning management systems or textbook replacements for K-12 schools.

The first service is Quipper School, the same online learning platform as the one provided in Indonesia. However, in the Philippines, Quipper School is available only to public schools through the company's partnership with the local Department of Education. The content on Quipper School consists of lesson slides and quizzes for grades 4 to 10.

The second service is Quipper School Premium, which contains study guides (downloadable PDF-based lessons) and quizzes for grades 4 to 12.

The third service is Quipper Video, which in addition to the study guides and quizzes, also includes video lessons for grades 10 to 12.

=== Mexico ===
The Quipper Mexico office carries two services. The first is Quipper School, a learning management system that offers free content for grades 7 to 12.

The second service, Quipper Video, is designed to help grade 9 students in Mexico City pass the Comisión Metropolitana de Instituciones Públicas de Educación Medio Superior (COMIPEMS), a public high school admission test. Apart from providing video lessons, study guides, and quizzes, Quipper Video also comes with a dedicated tutor, a personalized study plan, and a weekly report for parents.

Before subscribing to Quipper Video, students take a mock exam to enable Quipper to assess their level and determine the topics that need more attention.

== Recognition ==
In August 2018, Study Sapuri and Quipper won the Business Intelligence Group's Sustainability Service of the Year (Service) for the great contribution of Study Sapuri/Quipper services in providing affordable education to a greater number of students.
