= Works Applications =

- Native name: Works Applications Co., Ltd.
- Romanized name: Kabushiki-gaisha Wākusu
- Type: Private K.K.
- Traded as: JASDAQ 4329 (December 13, 2001 - June 15, 2011)
- Industry: Information and communication industry
- Founded: July 24, 1996
- Headquarters: Tokyo, Japan
- Area served: Worldwide
- Key people: Naoki Inoue (Chief Executive Officer)
- Products: Development, sales, and maintenance of the ERP package software "COMPANY" and "AI WORKS" for large enterprises
- Services: Online software
- Number of employees: 7,599 (Consolidated) *As of June 2017
- Divisions: New York, Los Angeles, Singapore, Shanghai, Chennai, Tokyo
- Subsidiaries: Infoview Technologies Pvt. Ltd.
- Website: www.worksap.com

Works Applications Co., Ltd. is an ERP system manufacturer in Japan, headquartered in Minato, Tokyo. It has business in the development, sales and support package system. Its product AI Works is a cloud-based ERP system based on machine learning technologies (AI) to automate tasks and improve processes.

== Overview ==
Works Applications was founded on July 24, 1996, and is headquartered in Tokyo, Minato-ku, Japan. According to Bloomberg, the company is the "biggest Japanese vendor of business software for payroll and human resources" in 2015. Its customers include government agencies, major trading companies, manufacturers and other big companies from Japan and outside Japan. According to the company, it had more than 7,000 customers as of 2016.

Its product AI Works operates by offering every employee a personal assistant. AI Works studies and analyzes operational log data generated from daily operations and makes predictions based on the task at hand and user’s position.

== History ==
- 1996
  - July - establishment
  - September - "COMPANY" HR Series officially launched
- 2001
  - April - "COMPANY Web Service" officially launched
  - December - JASDAQ (OTC) market listing
- 2002
  - September - "COMPANY Assignment & Project Management" officially launched
- 2003
  - April - "COMPANY Knowledge Information Portal" officially launched
  - May - HR product accounts for largest market share in Japan
- 2004
  - May - "COMPANY" AC series officially shipped
  - June - "COMPANY Learning Management" officially launched
- 2008
  - Established a technology research department by the name of Advanced Technology & Engineering Division (ATE)
- 2009
  - April - "COMPANY" SCM series officially shipped
- 2010
  - May - "COMPANY" EC series officially shipped
- 2014
  - February - industry, academia and government joint research project / COMPANY Innovation Academy "Economic analysis of companies in the human resources allocation mechanism" announced
  - October - AI-based ERP system announced by the name of AI Works
  - November - "LaKeel Messenger" by Works Applications officially shipped
- 2015
  - India based IVTL (Infoview Technologies Pvt Ltd) consolidated with Works Applications
  - My number management platform "My Number Keeping System Powered by Works Applications (MKS)" provided free of charge announcement
- 2016
  - July - Subsidiary, Ariel Networks, Inc., consolidated with Works Applications
- 2017
  - February - Established "WAP Tokushima Laboratory of AI and NLP"

== Awards and rankings ==
- "Think Big AWS Leadership Award", by Amazon Web Service in 2014
- "Good Design Award" for AI Works, by the Japan Institute of Design Promotion in 2015
- Ranked "Best Workplace in Asia" by the Great Place to Work Institute in 2017
- Received “Best Company” award for 3 consecutive years from "Best Workplaces in Asia" in April 2017

== See also ==
- Enterprise resource planning
