= LuckyFM Ibaraki Broadcasting System =

Radio station in Ibaraki Prefecture, Japan

JOYF
- Logo used since 2021

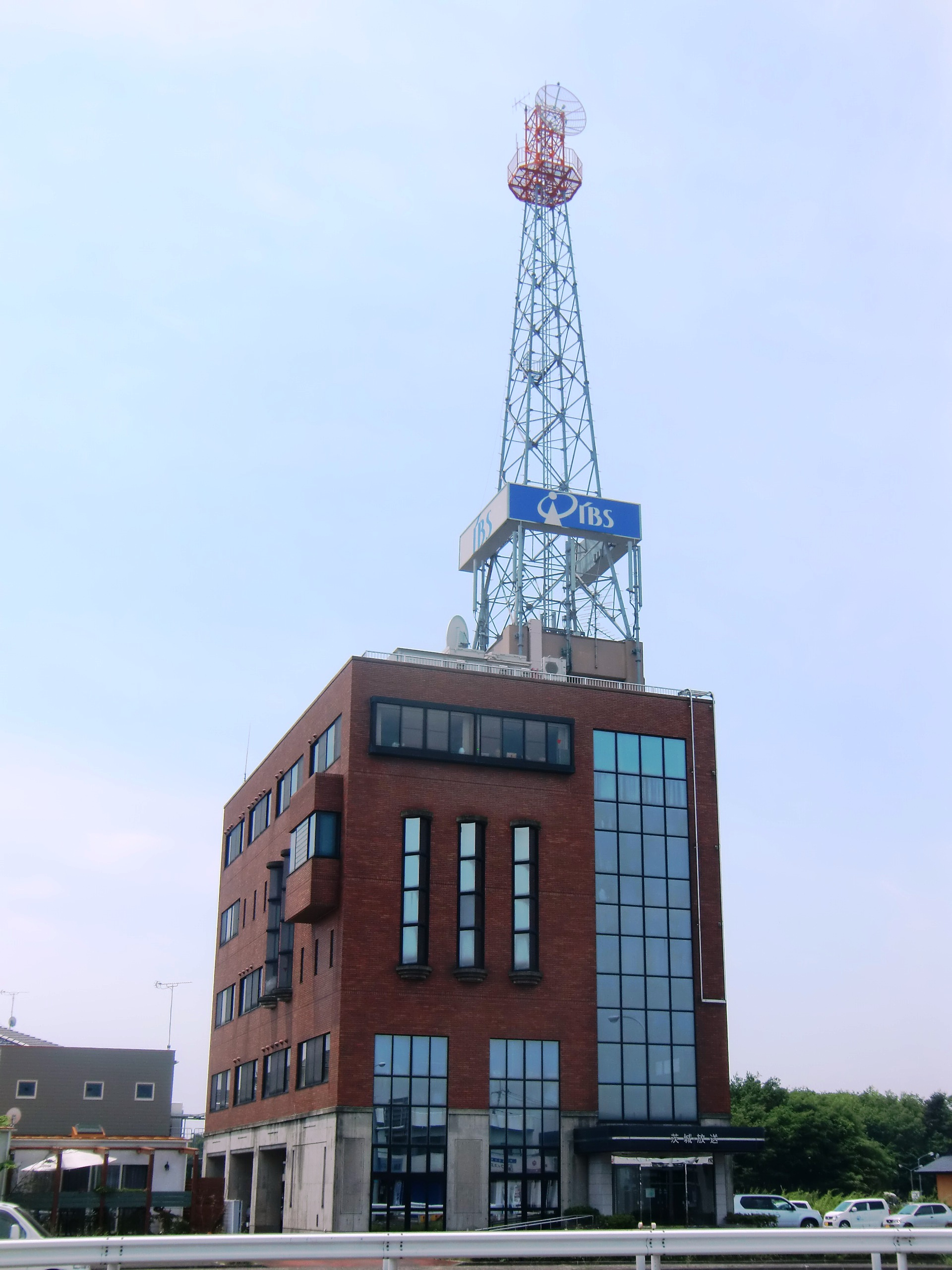
- Mito, Ibaraki Prefecture; Japan
- Broadcast area: Ibaraki Prefecture
- Frequencies: 1197 kHz (AM); 94.6 MHz (FM)
- Branding: LuckyFM Ibaraki Broadcasting

Programming
- Language: Japanese
- Format: Talk, Sports
- Affiliations: National Radio Network

Ownership
- Owner: LuckyFM Ibaraki Broadcasting System Co., Ltd.

History
- First air date: October 9, 1962; 64 years ago
- Former names: Ibaraki Broadcasting (1962–2015); i-FM Ibaraki Broadcasting (2015–2021)

Technical information
- Licensing authority: MIC

Links
- Website: lucky-ibaraki.com

LuckyFM Ibaraki Broadcasting System (LuckyFM茨城放送, LuckyFM Ibaraki Hōsō), formerly simply known as Ibaraki Broadcasting System (茨城放送, Ibaraki Hōsō), is a Japanese commercial radio station covering Ibaraki Prefecture. Following the installation of FM relay stations, it adopted the LuckyFM nickname and changed to its current name. The station uses the JOYF calls for the Mito station, while the AM relay station in Tsuchiura uses the JOYL calls until its shutdown in 2024.

== History ==
IBS was founded in September 1962 and started broadcasting on April 1, 1963, when JOYF (1200kc, 1kW) started (its power was increased to 5kW in 1977). JOYL started broadcasting on January 20, 1965 (1560kc, 100W output, moved to 1460kHz in December 1972 and increased its output to 1kW). On November 23, 1978, in accordance with the Geneva Frequency Plan, JOYF moved to 1197kHz and JOYL to 1458kHz.

Initially independent, it joined the National Radio Network in 2001. Its corporate structure changed on July 20, 2011, moving to a new subsidiary company, IBS Co, Ltd.

On July 21, 2015, IBS applied for complementary FM licenses in Mito, as part of a move initiated by AM radio stations. The Mito FM station received its full license on August 13, then on August 17, FM broadcasts started. In conjunction, the station started using i-FM as its commercial name rather than IBS. A license for a transmitter in Hitachi (Takasuzuyama) was received on September 3, receiving a full license on December 3 and starting on December 7. A preliminary license for a further relay station, in Moriya, was obtained on March 30, 2017, then receiving its full license on April 6 and started on April 7.

On March 19, 2020, Mito Ibaraki Initiative increased its shares in IBS to 45,.3%. A disaster cooperation agreement with Radio Fukushima and Tochigi Broadcasting was signed on September 1.

On April 1, 2021, the station's commercial name became LuckyFM and changed its website. LuckyFM was added to IBS's corporate name on February 1, 2024.

== Expansion plan for television broadcasting ==
Ibaraki as of 2025 has no commercial terrestrial television station broadcasting from within the prefecture. In 2004, the NHK Mito Broadcasting Station started television broadcasts exclusively over digital, giving the prefecture its first television station. On May 21, 2020, IBS became a strategic partner in Ibakira TV, a prefecture-owned web outlet.

On April 10, 2024, it was revealed that, in the results of a research about usage of frequencies, that the digital terrestrial frequency formerly used by the Open University of Japan (channel 28, LCN 12, vacated 2018) should be used by IBS for television transmission. Obstacles for installing such a TV station are high, but there is a possibility to launch an IBS television station, under the grounds that as of 2024, most viewers in the prefecture tuned their antennas towards Tokyo, where the signals of the Kanto stations are more visible.

If approved and if it broadcasts from the Tokyo Tower, the main transmitter will be located outside of the intended prefecture, which will cause in a significant amount of signal overspill to the eastern end of Tokyo Prefecture, parts of Saitama Prefecture and the Tokatsu region in Chiba Prefecture. A report will be necessary in case the station opens for reports from northern Ibaraki Prefecture where the hypothetical signal of IBS TV cannot be received.
