= Mercari =

Japanese multinational e-commerce corporation

Mercari, Inc.
- International logo since 2018

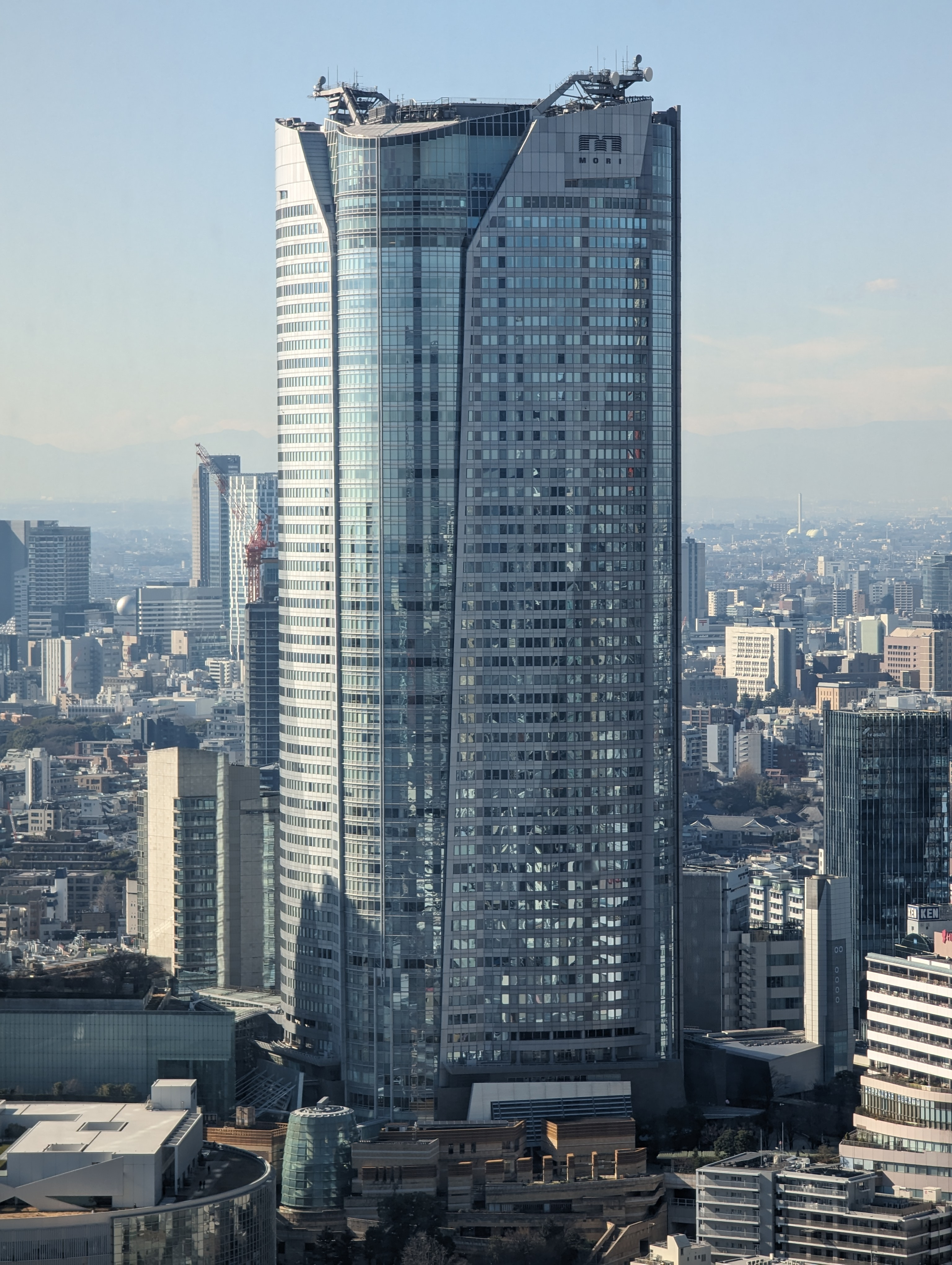
- Headquarters in Roppongi Hills Mori Tower in Minato, Tokyo
- Native name: メルカリ株式会社
- Type: Public
- Traded as: TYO: 4385
- Industry: E-commerce
- Founded: February 1, 2013; 13 years ago
- Founders: Shintaro Yamada, Ryo Ishizuka, Tommy Tomishima
- Headquarters: Minato, Tokyo, Japan; 35°39′38″N 139°43′45″E
- Area served: Japan, Taiwan, United Kingdom, and United States
- Key people: Shintaro Yamada (CEO)
- Services: Online shopping
- Subsidiaries: Merpay, Mercoin, Kashima Antlers, Mercari Surugaya
- Website: mercari.com

Mercari, Inc. is a Japanese e-commerce company founded in 2013. Mercari's main product, the marketplace app, was first launched in Japan in July 2013, and has since grown to become Japan's largest community-powered marketplace, with over JPY 10 billion in transactions carried out on the platform each month. Among those Japanese users utilizing one of the country's many community marketplace apps, 94% were found to be using Mercari.

Mercari expanded to the United States in 2014 and the United Kingdom in 2016. The Mercari app has been downloaded over 100 million times worldwide (as of 16 December 2017) and the company is the first in Japan to reach unicorn status.

== History ==
Japan logo since 2018

Kouzoh, Inc. (currently Mercari, Inc.) was founded by Shintaro Yamada, a Japanese serial entrepreneur in February 2013, and the Mercari app was launched for iOS and Android devices in July of that same year. Within a year of its release, Mercari had accumulated over one million individual listings on its platform.

The USD 75 million raised in Mercari's Series D round was set aside by the company for the purpose of further expansion in the US and UK, according to Chief Financial Officer Kei Nagasawa in a March 2016 interview.

In 2014, the company opened an office in San Francisco in preparation for the launch of its app in the United States, which took place in September of that same year. In the six years since its initial launch in the US, the Mercari app has been downloaded over 40 million times and has risen as high as number 3 on the US App Store rankings. There are currently around 100 employees located between Mercari's Palo Alto and Portland offices.

It was announced In June 2017, that John Lagerling had joined Mercari from Facebook's management team and would be assuming the title of Chief Business Officer. He has also since been named the US CEO of Mercari, Inc.

In January 2016, Mercari opened its first European office in London. In December 2018, Mercari announced it will dissolve the European branch as a "temporary retreat".

In November 2026, Mercari announced a joint venture with hobby shop Suruga-ya to establish a new online storefront as well as physical stores in the United States selling goods related to Japanese pop culture.

== Products and services ==
Mercari's main product is the Mercari marketplace app, which allows users to buy and sell items quickly from their smartphones. In Japan, the app is known for its ease of use and unique shipping system, which allows users to ship items anonymously from local convenience stores through agreements with Yamato Transport and the Japan Post Service. In the United States, Mercari collaborates with USPS, UPS and FedEx to let users print shipping labels, in addition to allowing sellers to use a separately purchased label for larger items.

Mercari shares its Tokyo offices with its wholly owned subsidiary Souzoh, Inc., which operates several other consumer-to-consumer (C2C) applications in Japan.

== Awards ==
- Awarded "Best Shopping App" by Google Play in 2013
- Awarded "Best App" by Google Play in 2014 and 2015
- Awarded "Best Local App" by Google Play in 2016
- Awarded "Forbes Japan’s Startup of the Year" in 2014, 2015, and 2016 (inducted into the Hall of Fame in 2017)
- Awarded "Special Jury Award (Global Expansion)" by the Japanese Ministry of Economy, Trade and Industry (METI) at the Second Nippon Venture Awards (part of the Prime Minister's Awards) in 2016
- Awarded the "Emerging Leader Award" at the 2016 Japan-US Innovation Awards Symposium
- Awarded "Best Commercial" for "The Bride" at the LA Film Awards 2017

== See also ==
- List of online marketplaces
