= New Heisei station =

New Japanese radio and TV stations, 1989–1999

In Japanese broadcasting, a new Heisei station (平成新局, Heisei shin kyoku) refers to a broadcast radio or television station founded in the Heisei era, particularly in its first decade (1989–1999). Currently, "long-established station" (老舗局) is used as an antonym.

== Overview ==
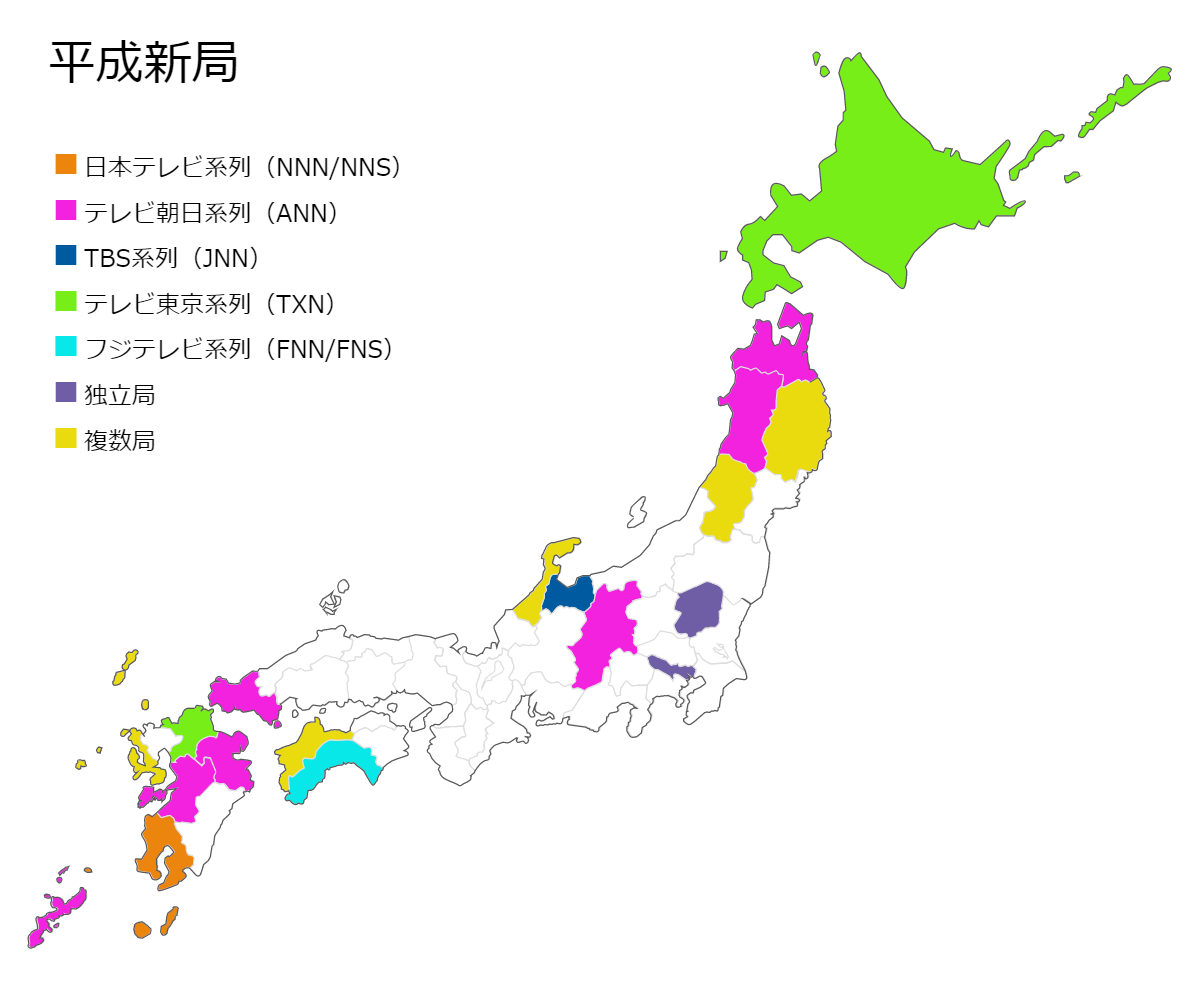
Distribution of the 24 new Heisei television stations: orange for NNN, pink for ANN, blue for JNN, green for TXN, cyan for FNN, purple for independent stations and yellow for two stations. ANN has the most number of stations gained.

The new television stations established in this period, all on the UHF band, corresponded to a "government plan for prefectures across Japan to have a limit of four commercial television stations", and for radio, a two-frequency (1 AM station + 1 FM station) policy, cooperating with flagship stations, newspaper companies (national and local newspapers), etc. established in various places, all on the FM band.

On October 1, 1989, TV Hokkaido (TVh), TV-U Yamagata (TUY), Kumamoto Asahi Broadcasting (KAB) were the first TV stations to open in the era, this sequence continued until Tochigi Television opened on April 1, 1999. At that time, there were few complete affiliates of the ANN, many stations were opened as its affiliates. On radio, this corresponds to the period after the start of FM Yamagata on April 1, 1989.

Community broadcasting was massified during the Heisei era, and it falls into the category of the new Heisei station from the time of FM doruka, which was opened as the first station.

The concept basically does not have a dual-affiliate setup (like most stations founded during the Showa era), but many of the areas where such stations opened do not have a TV Tokyo affiliate, instead resorting to program sales. However, like the long-established stations, the sponsor part has been replaced with a spot. In addition, some stations sell and purchase programs other than TV Tokyo (due to poor maintenance of relay stations, it is very often excluded, so the frequency is small).

== List of stations ==
=== Radio ===
Most of the stations were allocated radio waves all at once in the late Showa era, and the meaning is different from the new Heisei TV stations, but here I listed the stations that opened after the beginning of the Heisei era. All AM stations finished starting by 1963.

- ☆ is available on radiko.
- ★ is a station that was broadcasting nationwide until March 31, 2012, with radiko.jp's recovery support project.

Area	Name	Nickname	Network	Opening date	Remarks
Hokkaido	FM North Wave☆	NORTH WAVE	JFL	August 1, 1993	(Note: Available in Sapporo and major cities However, there are areas such as Abashiri and Wakkanai that lack coverage.)
Yamagata Prefecture	FM Yamagata☆	Rhythm Station	JFN	April 1, 1989	(Note: Known as Boy FM until March 2010.)
Fukushima Prefecture	FM Fukushima☆★	Fukushima FM	JFN	October 1, 1995	(Note: Fukushima FM opened all JFN affiliated stations in the Tohoku region.)
Tochigi Prefecture	FM Tochigi☆	RADIO BERRY	JFN	April 1, 1994	(Note: With the opening of the main station, there are commercial FM stations in the Kanto region, with the exception of Ibaraki prefecture.)
Chiba Prefecture	Bay FM☆	bayfm	Independent station	October 1, 1989	(Note: It is the first Heisei new station as an independent station.)
Tokyo	InterFM897☆	interfm	MegaNet →JFN (Note: From September 1, 2020, National FM Broadcasting Council(JFN ) Special Affiliation Bureau.)	April 1, 1996	(Note: At first, it was an affiliated company of Nifco, but due to poor management July 2006, complete conversion of TV Tokyo to subsidiary. Furthermore, on June 20, 2012, TV Tokyo withdrew its capital and became a subsidiary of Kinoshita Group, and from September 1, 2020, JFN acquired all shares from the Kinoshita Group, and started JFNC program net from November 1 in the same year.) (Note: The company name from its establishment until March 31, 2014, is FM Interwave, and the company name until March 31, 2017, and the nickname from the opening to September 39, 2015 is InterFM.)
Niigata Prefecture	Niigata Kenmin FM Broadcasting☆	FM Port	Independent station	December 20, 2000	Closed on June 30, 2020]. (Note: At the beginning of the station, it joined JFL, but it was dissolved shortly after.) (Note: Facing insolvency due to a chronic lack of sponsors, the suspension of advertising from major sponsors made it difficult to continue the broadcasting business and closed the station.)
Ishikawa Prefecture	FM Ishikawa☆	HELLO FIVE	JFN		
Gifu Prefecture	FM Gifu☆	FM GIFU	JFN	April 1, 2001	(Note: The head office is located in Ogaki city.) (Note: March 1, 2014, Due to the bankruptcy of the old company "Gifu FM Broadcasting", broadcasting continues as a new company "FM Gifu".) (Note: All JFN affiliated stations in the Tokai region opened with the opening of FM GIFU.) (Note: Until December 2014, the nickname was Radio80.)
Aichi Prefecture	ZIP-FM☆	ZIP-FM	JFL	October 1, 1993	(Note: The opening of ZIP-FM completes the JFL network in the five major metropolitan areas.)
Aichi Prefecture	Aichi International Broadcasting	RADIO-i	MegaNet	April 1, 2000	Closed on September 30, 2010. (Note: Since the start of the station, it was greatly affected by the recession, so CM revenue was sluggish and the deficit expanded, so it was never possible to achieve a single-year profit. In August 2008, Kowa, a major trading company, attempted to rebuild the company by making it a wholly owned subsidiary, but the Lehman Brothers bankruptcy caused a further recession. As a result, while the management deteriorated, it was also related to the restructuring of the parent company Kowa, and it was the first prefectural terrestrial commercial terrestrial broadcaster in Japan to be forced to "close business (closed station)" (the license was on October 7, 2010, it was returned to Ministry of Internal Affairs and Communications (Tokai Bureau of Telecommunications), and "Aichi International Broadcasting" as a corporation went through liquidation procedures. disappeared over time).) (Note: Hamamatsu City (Shizuoka Prefecture) was also targeted for broadcasting.)
Aichi Prefecture	Radio NEO☆	Radio NEO	MegaNet	April 1, 2014	. (Note: At the beginning of the station, it was spun off on December 1, 2016, as InterFM Nagoya Broadcasting Station. Former nickname: InterFM NAGOYA.)
Shiga Prefecture	FM Shiga☆	e-radio	JFN	December 1, 1996	(Note: The only JFN affiliated station in the Keishi area.)
Kyoto	FM Kyoto☆	α-STATION	Independent station	July 1, 1991	(Note: In the Keihanshin region, only Kyoto and Hyogo were independent stations. However, since Hyogo joined JFN in 2003 due to financial difficulties, it is the only independent station in the Keihanshin area.)
Osaka Prefecture	FM802☆	FM802	JFL	June 1, 1989	(Note: This is the first Heisei new station among JFL affiliates.)
Osaka Prefecture	FM802☆	FM COCOLO	MegaNet	October 1, 1995	(Note: The initial company name was Kansai Intermedia.) (Note: Business integration with FM802 on April 1, 2012. However, broadcasting will continue (FM COCOLO, business transfer to FM802 Radio reorganization, full-scale also: Nihon Keizai Shimbun ).).)
Hyogo Prefecture	Hyogo FM Broadcasting☆	Kiss FM KOBE	JFN	October 1, 1990	(Note: Was a member of JFN from April 2003 to April 2010, but was expelled due to bankruptcy. After that, although it returned to an independent station from May 2010 (* JFN program distribution (program supply) continued for listener protection), a new company took over management on November 4, 2010, and is allowed to rejoin the JFN.)
Okayama Prefecture	Okayama FM Broadcasting☆	FM Okayama	JFN	April 1, 1999	(Note: JFN affiliated stations in the Chugoku and Shikoku regions are the last stations.)
Tokushima Prefecture	FM Tokushima☆	FM Tokushima	JFN	April 1, 1992	(Note: JFN affiliated stations in the Shikoku region opened at the same time as Kochi.)
Kochi Prefecture	FM Kochi☆	Hi-Six	JFN	April 1, 1992	(Note: The JFN affiliated station in the Shikoku region opened at the same time as Tokushima.)
Fukuoka Prefecture	Cross FM☆	CROSS FM	JFL	September 1, 1993	(Note: The initial company name was FM Kyushu. On July 1, 2008, due to the bankruptcy of FM Kyushu due to insolvency, the new corporation "CROSS FM Co., Ltd." established by separation of old and new inherited the broadcasting license, and the former corporation's "stock Company FM Kyushu" has moved to liquidation procedures.)
Fukuoka Prefecture	Love FM International Broadcasting☆	LOVE FM	MegaNet	April 1, 1997	(Note: On 2011January 1 on Community Broadcasting Station on Tenjin FM Co., Ltd. Changed the company name to Love FM International Broadcasting instead of transferring the business and abolishing the community broadcasting station.)
Saga Prefecture	FM Saga☆	FMS	JFN	April 1, 1992	It opened as an independent station, but later joined JFN in 1991. It was the second JFN-affiliated station to open.
Oita Prefecture	FM Oita☆	Air Radio FM88	JFN		
Kagoshima prefecture	FM Kagoshima☆	μFM	JFN	October 1, 1992	(Note: In the southern part of Kyushu, this was the second JFN-affiliated station after Miyazaki.)

=== Television ===
Area	Station	Abbreviation	Network	Opening date	Remarks
Hokkaido	TV Hokkaido	TVh	TXN	October 1, 1989	(Note: Until the end of the analog broadcasting period, it did not cover the entire Eastern Hokkaido area and the majority of the northern area, but with the transition to digital in 2011, the relay area was gradually expanded, and on December 22, 2015, the Hokkaido-wide network expansion was completed.)
Aomori Prefecture	Aomori Asahi Broadcasting	ABA	ANN	October 1, 1991	It was originally based in Hachinohe City. Around the time of digitization, it was moved and integrated into Aomori City, where the broadcasting center is currently located. (Note: Until the opening of ABA, most of the programs were on Aomori Broadcasting (RAB, a cross-net station affiliated with Nippon Television and TV Asahi), and were outside the organization of RAB. A small portion of TV Asahi programming was broadcast on Aomori Television (ATV, formerly affiliated with TV Asahi).) (Note: With the opening of ABA, Aomori Broadcasting (RAB), which was a dual affiliate of the Nippon TV network and the TV Asahi network, it then became entirely affiliated to Nippon TV.)
Iwate prefecture	Iwate Menkoi Television	mit	FNN・FNS	April 1, 1991	(Note: The original head office at the start of its broadcast was located in Mizusawa City (now Oshu City).)
Iwate prefecture	Iwate Asahi Television	IAT	ANN	October 1, 1996	(Note: With the opening of the IAT, all prefectures in the Tohoku region with stations affiliated with TV Asahi will be aligned. The opening of the IAT was virtually the last opening of the TV Asahi network.)
Akita	Akita Asahi Broadcasting	AAB	ANN	October 1, 1992	
Yamagata prefecture	TV-U Yamagata	TUY	JNN	October 1, 1989	(Note: Headquarters currently in Sakata City) (Note: Yamagata Television (YTS) changed affiliate from Fuji TV network to TV Asahi network. After that, until the opening of SAY, the only commercial station in Yamagata Prefecture was the only Fuji TV affiliated program (limited to the minimum number) available.)
Yamagata prefecture	Sakuranbo Television Broadcasting	SAY	FNN・FNS	April 1, 1997	(Note: Yamagata Television (YTS), which was affiliated with Fuji TV, became a network affiliated with TV Asahi. Due to the change, the company was established and opened by signature of Yamagata Prefecture. The opening of SAY was virtually the last opening of the Fuji TV affiliated station.)
Tochigi Prefecture	Tochigi Television	GYT	JAITS	April 1, 1999	The abbreviation is TTV. The opening of GYT is also the last independent station opening in the era of terrestrial analog broadcasting.
Tokyo	Tokyo MX	MX	JAITS	November 1, 1995	(Note: The abbreviation at the time of the company's establishment was TMT.)
Toyama Prefecture	Tulip Television	TUT	JNN	October 1, 1990	(Note: When the station first opened, the company name was TV-U Toyama.) (Note: At the beginning of the station, the head office was located in Takaoka City. Around the same time as the building was rebuilt, the company moved and merged with the Broadcasting Center in Toyama City.)
Ishikawa Prefecture	TV Kanazawa	KTK	NNN・NNS	April 1, 1990	(Note: With the opening of KTK, all prefectures on the Sea of Japan side of Honshu have NTV affiliates. In addition, some Nippon TV series programs were broadcast on Hokuriku Broadcasting (MRO) for a period after the opening of the station.)
Ishikawa Prefecture	Hokuriku Asahi Broadcasting	HAB	ANN	October 1, 1991	(Note: Outside the broadcasting target area, it is also available in the Fukui Prefecture (there are households that can access HAB in the Reihoku region, where the station does not actually exist), and in some parts of Toyama Prefecture.) (Note: Opened on the same day as ABA of the same TV Asahi affiliated station.)
Nagano Prefecture	Nagano Asahi Broadcasting	abn	ANN	April 1, 1991	(Note: With the opening of abn, TV Shinshu (TSB), which was a dual affiliate of the Nippon Television and TV Asahi networks, moved exclusively to Nippon TV.)
Yamaguchi Prefecture	Yamaguchi Asahi Broadcasting	yab	ANN	October 1, 1993	(Note: The initial abbreviation was YAB.) (Note: Until the start of yab, most of the programs were on Yamaguchi Broadcasting (KRY, a cross-net station affiliated with Nippon Television and TV Asahi), and were out of KRY's organization. A small part was broadcast on TV Yamaguchi (TYS, which was once affiliated with TV Asahi).) (Note: With the opening of yab, Yamaguchi Broadcasting (KRY), which was a dual affiliate of Nippon Television and TV Asahi affiliates, moved entirely to Nippon TV.)
Ehime Prefecture	I-Television	ITV	JNN	October 1, 1992	(Note: When the company first opened, the company name was Iyo TV.) (Note: Some TBS affiliated programs were broadcast for a period of time after ITV started on NNN/NNS affiliate Nankai Broadcasting (RNB).) (Note: ITV's opening was virtually the last opening of JNN affiliated stations.)
Ehime Prefecture	Ehime Asahi Television	eat	ANN	April 1, 1995	
Kochi Prefecture	Kochi Sun Sun Broadcasting	KSS	FNN/FNS	April 1, 1997	(Note: Started on the same day as SAY, the same Fuji TV affiliate.) (Note: Daijiro Hashimoto (Kochi Prefecture Governor at that time) was instrumental in opening the station.)
Fukuoka Prefecture	TVQ Kyushu Broadcasting	TVQ	TXN	April 1, 1991	(Note: When the station first opened, the company name was TXN Kyushu.) (Note: With the opening of TVQ, the TX Network was completed.) (Note: Available in most areas of Saga Prefecture outside the broadcasting target area, and parts of Yamaguchi Prefecture, Nagasaki Prefecture, Kumamoto Prefecture, and Oita Prefecture.)
Nagasaki prefecture	Nagasaki Cultural Telecasting	NCC	ANN	April 1, 1990	(Note: Until the opening of NCC, most ANN affiliated programs (excluding news programs) were broadcast on Nagasaki Broadcasting (NBC) (only a small part of programming was also broadcast on TV Nagasaki (KTN)).)
Nagasaki prefecture	Nagasaki International Television	NIB	NNN・NNS	April 1, 1991	KTN moved entirely to FNN.
Kumamoto Prefecture	Kumamoto Asahi Broadcasting	KAB	ANN	October 1, 1989	(Note: Most ANN news programs and half of the general programs were broadcast on TV Kumamoto (TKU), and the rest was shared between Kumamoto Broadcasting (RKK) and Kumamoto Prefectural Television (KKT).) (Note: With the opening of KAB, TV Kumamoto (TKU), which was a dual affiliate of Fuji TV and TV Asahi, moved entirely to Fuji TV.)
Oita Prefecture	Oita Asahi Broadcasting	OAB	ANN	October 1, 1993	(Note: Opened on the same day as yab, the same TV Asahi affiliated station.) (Note: Until the opening of OAB, most ANN news programs, the weekday TV Asahi noon slot, and most general programs were broadcast on TV Oita (TOS), with the rest shared on Oita Broadcasting (OBS).) (Note: With the opening of OAB, TV Oita (TOS), which was a triple affiliate broadcaster (Fuji TV, Nippon TV, and TV Asahi), it then became a dual-affiliated broadcaster (Fuji TV and Nippon TV).)
Kagoshima Prefecture	Kagoshima Yomiuri Television	KYT	NNN・NNS	April 1, 1994	(Note: Some Nippon Television series programs were broadcast on Minaminihon Broadcasting (MBC) for a period of time after the opening of KYT.) (Note: KYT opening was virtually the last opening of the Nippon Television affiliated station.)
Okinawa Prefecture	Ryukyu Asahi Broadcasting	QAB	ANN	October 1, 1995	(Note: At the time just before the opening of QAB, ANN affiliated programs (excluding news programs) were broadcast only on Ryukyu Broadcasting (RBC).)

== Main features ==
Shortly after its establishment, the bubble economy collapsed, and it was affected by the Heisei recession and the lost decade that came after. After that, in addition to the recession, there were circumstances unique to the industry, such as construction work to support digital terrestrial broadcasting and a shift away from television. Many stations are small.

Also, in the analog era, there were few relay stations (Note: In the 1980s (the end of the Showa era), and some of the TV stations that opened (TV Setouchi, etc.) tended to be the same. However, there are stations such as Akita Asahi Broadcasting and Tulip TV in the late analog period, which are only a few stations less than the predecessor UHF stations in the same area.) Many broadcasting stations do not include all households in broadcast area. (Note: While some long-established commercial broadcasters do not have as many relay stations as NHK in the era of terrestrial analog broadcasting, there were many areas that were not subject to station placement for a long time because relay stations were often maintained, but with the support from the government due to the promotion of terrestrial digital broadcasting, it gradually became as good as a long-established station. A relay station was established in However, even now, there are still areas where there is no plan to set up a relay station only for the new Heisei station.) For this reason, in areas where direct reception is impossible, install a high-gain antenna in a higher position, rebroadcast cable TV, or even receive it at existing stations in surrounding prefectures. Even in the new Heisei station, there are special circumstances due to geographical relationships.

Furthermore, for the above reasons, the scale of the company itself is small, and it tends to have weaker program production and sales capabilities than the TV and radio stations that have opened earlier. In addition, the stations that opened in the latter half of the 1990s were affected by the Heisei recession and were established in a smaller and more compact manner.

- Low number of employees
- Headquarters building is small or simple
- There are few branch offices and branch office networks

and other features. As for ITV, for a while the master was placed at an affiliated station outside the prefecture.

In contrast to the Nippon TV series (NNN/NNS) and TBS series (JNN), which have many starting stations, and the Fuji TV series (FNN/FNS), which expanded its network with the issuance of a large number of UHF station licenses, the TV Asahi series (ANN) network Expansion was delayed. For this reason, Heisei new stations have the most ANN member stations (out of 24 stations, 11 stations are ANN member stations). Of the 24 Fullnet stations, half joined the Heisei period.

In addition, in contrast to the long-established stations led by local newspaper companies, most of the Heisei new stations' major shareholders have key stations and major affiliated stations in the top three. In addition, there are few other affiliated programs on the net, and the proportion of in-house produced programs is also small.

Although the number is small, there are newspaper companies that are closely related to the Heisei Shinkyoku (Hokkoku Shimbun, Nagasaki Shimbun, Okinawa Times, etc.).

Most of the Heisei new stations have not listed. (Note: In the first place, the specific terrestrial basic broadcasters are all long-established stations that are listed. Only for Broadcasting System of Niigata (until March 31, 2023).)
