= Radio in Japan =

Radio broadcasting has been used in Japan since its debut in 1925 when three local stations in Tokyo, Nagoya and Osaka, forerunners of the public company NHK, received permission from the government to start broadcasting.

During World War II, radio programmes ended up reflecting the militaristic policies of the Japanese government and throughout the conflict, radio was an important propaganda weapon of the state. With the reform of the broadcasting system in 1950, NHK became an independent company supported by the licence fee paid by listeners, and at the same time the market for commercial broadcasting was liberalised. Thus the first private networks such as Japan Radio Network, National Radio Network, Japan FM Network and Japan FM League were born.

With the advent of television, the radio medium gradually lost its role as the main source of entertainment and information for the Japanese, and today only a fraction of the population listens to the radio frequently.

== History ==
=== Early experiments and the foundation of the Nippon Hōsō Kyōkai ===
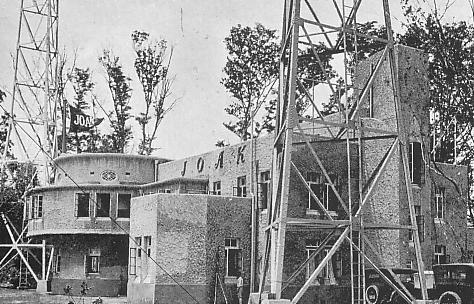
The site of Tokyo's first radio station, one of the three stations that formed the Nippon Hōsō Kyōkai in 1926

Following the confirmation of the existence of electricity in the 18th century, there were numerous experiments on its possible use in the field of communications. In Japan, the first experiment on wireless telegraphy was carried out in 1886 by Shida Rinzaburō by exploiting the phenomenon of electrical conduction in the waters of the Sumida River in Tokyo. Before that, Hiraga Gennai had built a generator of static electricity, the elekiter, from the discoveries of the Dutchmen stationed in Nagasaki.

Gotō Shinpei's speech

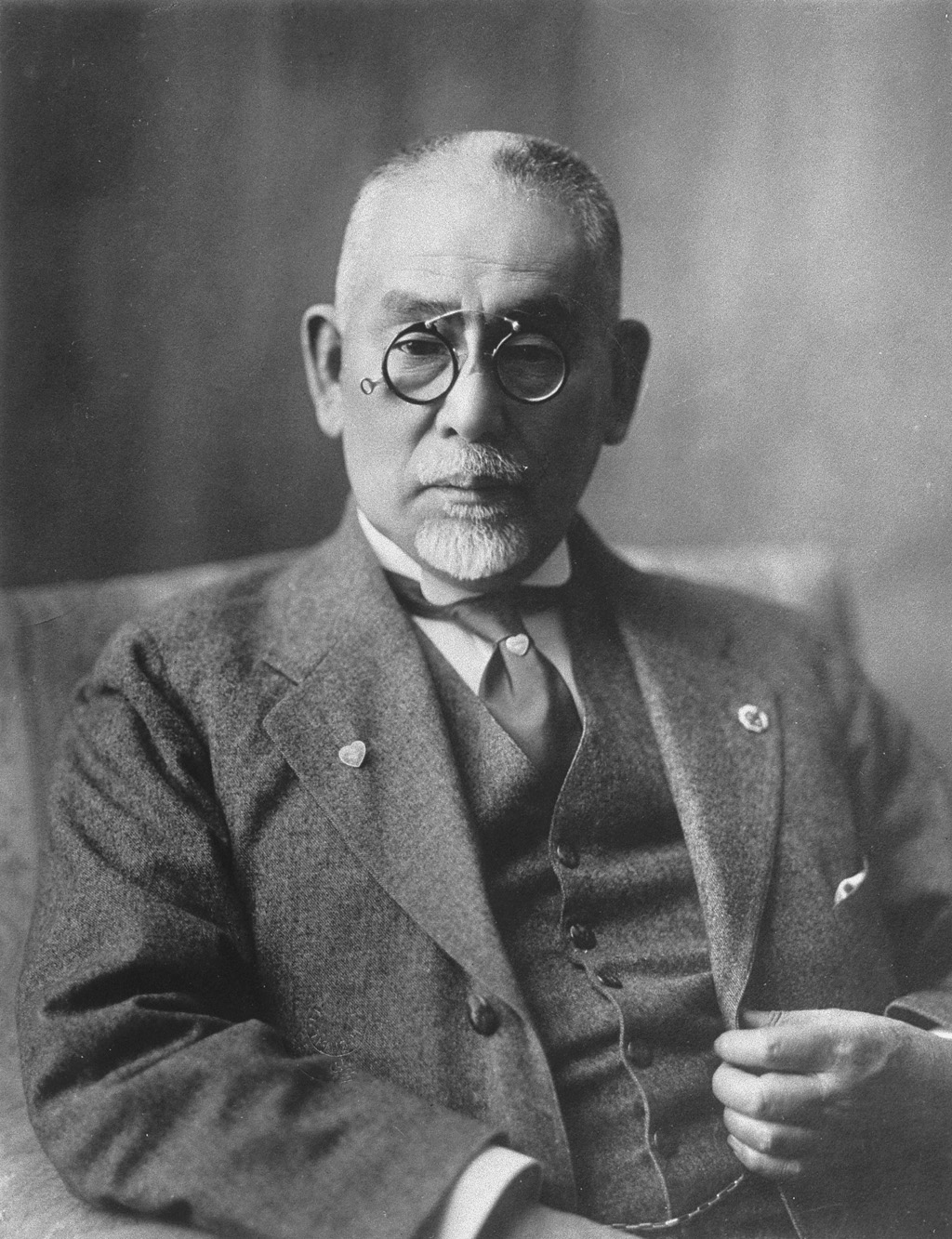

In his speech, the director Gotō Shinpei listed the objectives that radio should pursue within the context of Japanese society: to create equal cultural opportunities (universally sharing the benefits of radio and likewise eliminating the boundaries between city and countryside, age groups, genders and social classes), to bring a new splendour to domestic life (families could spend time at home together benefiting from this new domestic entertainment), to spread education and to revitalise the country's economy.

It was mainly the Japanese government that carried out the research on radio technology and took the necessary steps for its dissemination in the country. In the wake of KDKA's success in the US, from 1920 the Ministry of Communications began to process licence applications for the first radio stations in Japan, many of which came from communications equipment shops, publishing houses, news agencies or newspapers. The government pressed for the various companies to merge into non-profit institutions and, after this consolidation process, three stations in Tokyo, Osaka and Nagoya were given the go-ahead to start broadcasting in 1925. The first broadcasting tests were carried out from a temporary studio at the Tokyo radio station in Shibaura on the morning of 22 March, when an announcer scanned the call sign ‘JOAK’ letter by letter before giving the floor to the then director Gotō Shinpei. Regular broadcasts began the following July from the Atagoyama studio, finally bringing Japan into the age of information technology and telecommunications.

After the start of local broadcasting, it became increasingly urgent for the government to establish a central institution for the management of broadcasting services that could reach the entire country. The three stations in Tokyo, Osaka and Nagoya were thus merged in 1926 into a single national organisation called the Nippon Hōsō Kyōkai, a semi-governmental legal entity that began operating under the supervision of the Ministry of Communications. By 1929 the Nippon Hōsō Kyōkai had reached almost the entire country through the opening of four more stations in the areas of Hokkaidō, Tōhoku, Chūgoku and Kyūshū.

=== Radio before and after the war: the birth of commercial radio ===
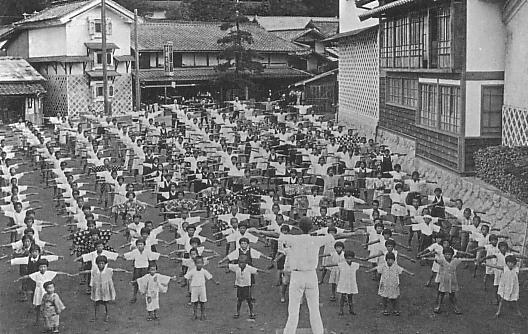
Crowds of people perform gymnastic exercises with the aid of the radio in the 1930s

Early broadcasts were mainly live coverage of school baseball tournaments and educational programmes. In 1928, radio calisthenics was introduced in Tokyo, with musical accompaniment for indoor or outdoor exercises. This activity, which became extremely popular within a few years, helped to create a sense of unity and establish radio as an integral part of Japanese people's daily lives.

After an initial period in which it enjoyed relative independence, Nippon Hōsō Kyōkai's schedule soon came under the direct control of the government authorities. Since the late 1920s, in fact, Japan was experiencing a time of great political instability, due to the financial crisis, rising unemployment, the collapse of the stock markets and the growing anti-government sentiment fuelled by the most extremist groups. The attempted coup d'état of 1936, the success of which was also foiled by a series of radio broadcasts to the rebels, convinced the government of the potential of radio as a mass medium and its possible use as a propaganda weapon.

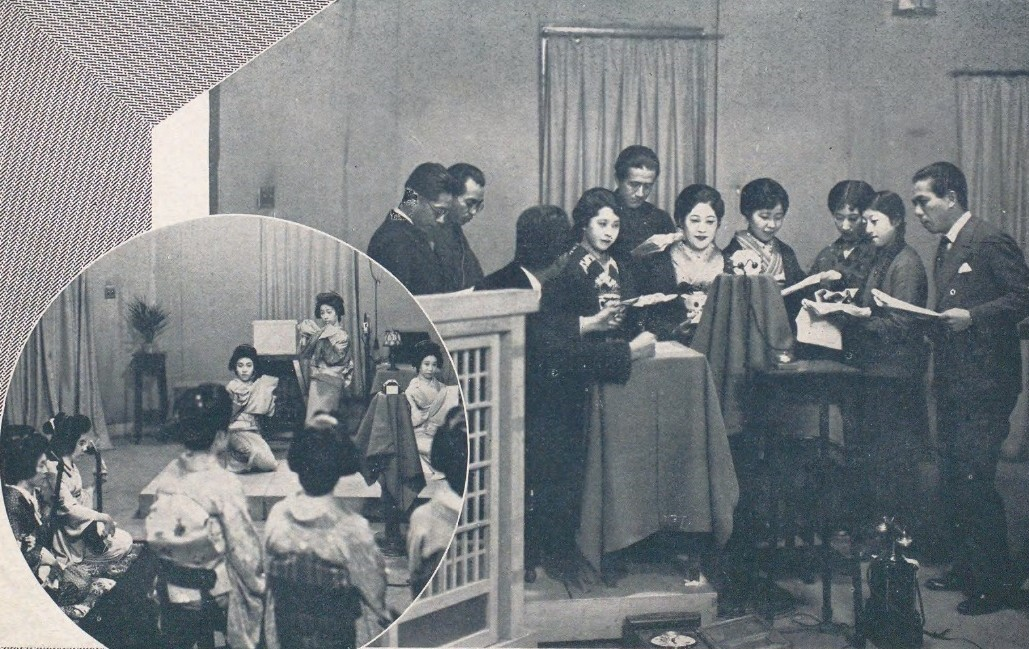
Actors and performers during the recording of a radio broadcast in Tokyo, circa 1930s

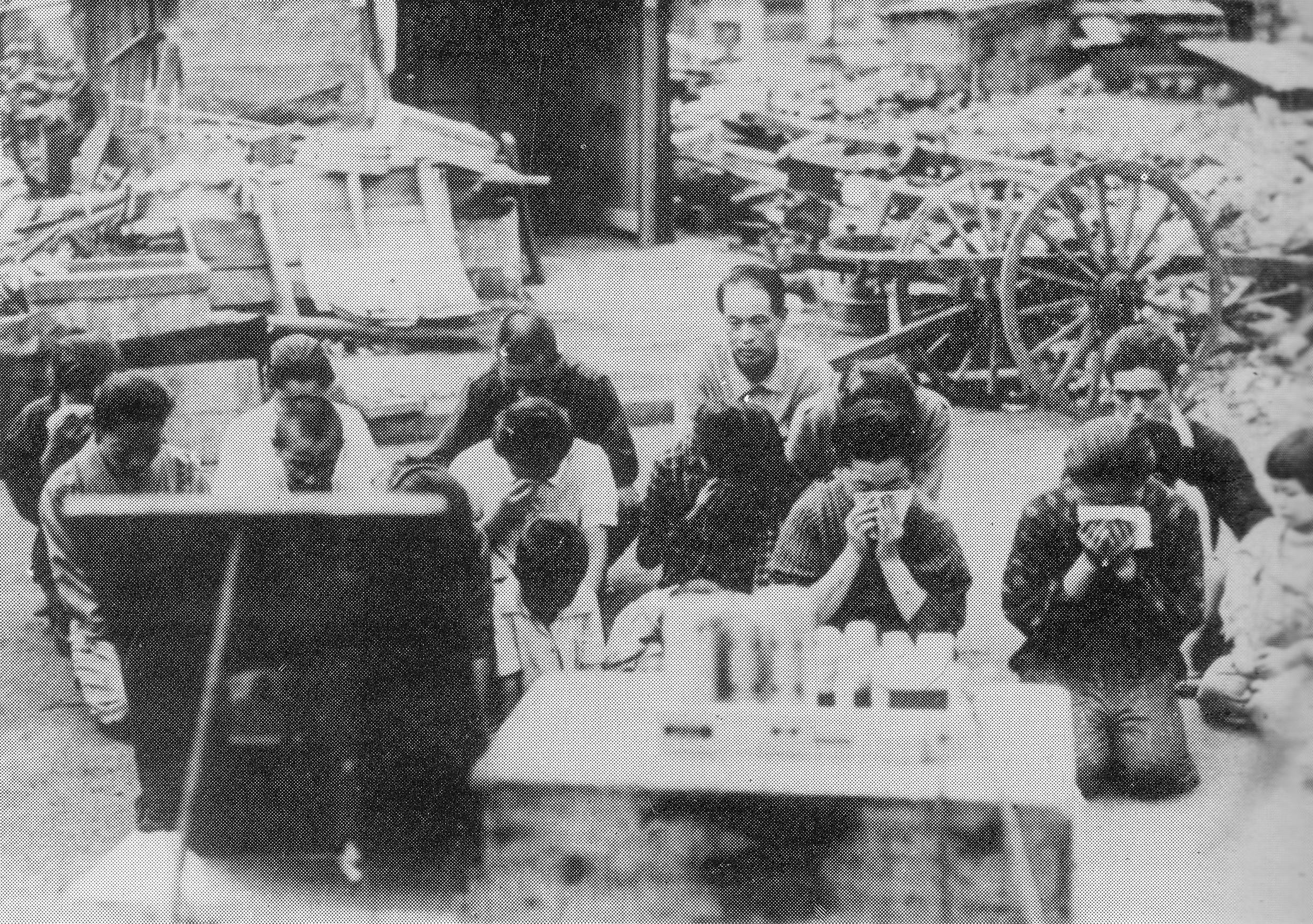
Japanese civilians listen to the transmission of the imperial rescript of Japan's surrender to the Allies

Thus during World War II, radio programmes ended up even more reflecting the militaristic policies of the Japanese government. The radio was the medium through which the Japanese could keep abreast of the progress of the war, although the government carefully avoided broadcasting the most unpleasant details so as not to undermine public morale and reassure its people of an increasingly unlikely victory in the conflict. Similarly, the defeatist propaganda work carried out by Iva Toguri D'Aquino and the other members of Tokyo Rose on Radio Tokyo was intended to demoralise the American soldiers. On 15 August 1945, six days after the second atomic bombing of Nagasaki, Emperor Hirohito addressed his citizens for the first time, announcing the surrender to the Allies via radio and effectively ending hostilities.

After the war, the occupation forces removed all government and military control over the Nippon Hōsō Kyōkai. In 1950, following a reform of the Japanese broadcasting system, it became an independent company supported by the licence fee paid by listeners and at the same time the market for commercial broadcasting was liberalised. On 1 September 1951, the first commercial broadcaster, CBC Radio ‘Joar’ in Nagoya, started broadcasting, followed shortly after by NJB in Osaka. Subsequently, several other stations obtained broadcasting rights (among them ABC Radio, RKB Radio, KBS Kyoto and KRT Radio Tokyo) and by 1952 there were eighteen private radio stations in operation. Thus a new era began, with the public broadcaster Nippon Hōsō Kyōkai (since then better identified by its English acronym NHK) on one side and commercial broadcasters financed by advertising revenue on the other.

Although it never became a medium devoted to entertainment as in the United States, radio nevertheless played a major role in boosting the morale of the Japanese people during the difficult post-war transition period. Indeed, the Allied reform of the broadcasting system favoured the emergence of a new genre of programmes designed specifically for the public. The best known of these, Gaitō rokuon, represented an entirely new concept for Japanese radio listeners, offering interviews and exchanges of opinions recorded directly in the street among the people. There were also the first prize games (such as Kimi no na wa, Watashi wa dare deshō and Tonchi kyōshitsu) and radio dramas (including Mukō sangen ryōdanari and Kane no naru oka), the concept of which was imported from America; singing contests for amateurs such as Nodo jiman shirōto ongakukai contributed to the popularisation of singing as a new form of entertainment. With the end of the occupation period, international broadcasting on Radio Japan also resumed after six years of enforced silence.

=== The advent of TV and the birth of the first FM stations ===
In 1951, the first edition of the music festival Kōhaku Uta Gassen was aired, a popular programme that switched from radio to television in 1953, quickly becoming a mainstream phenomenon and one of the country's most watched media events. Due to the advent of the new medium, however, radio began to lose its appeal in the eyes of sponsors, so that commercial stations risked finding themselves without their main source of income. In an attempt to cope with the competition from the new medium, many of them thus began to offer programmes suitable for a younger audience, extending broadcasting hours beyond midnight and limiting the number of quizzes and soap operas to reduce operating costs. In the 1960s, the establishment of the private networks Japan Radio Network (JRN) and National Radio Network (NRN) led to the agreement to broadcast nightly professional baseball games, which through the main commercial stations could reach the whole country. On 1 October 1967, on Nippon Broadcasting System, one of NRN's flagship radio stations, the first episode of All Night Nippon was broadcast, which in time would emerge as one of the most successful radio programmes in Japan's radio history.

In 1954, the US company Regency launched the first transistor radio in history, shortly followed by the release of the Sony TR-55 model in August 1955. The radio thus went from being a cumbersome and expensive household appliance to an object that was increasingly smaller, more manageable and therefore usable anywhere; it was precisely its portability that had a huge impact on the social behaviour of the time and helped radio regain much of the popularity it had lost in the previous years. During the automobile boom at the turn of the sixties and seventies, the radio proved to be even more of an indispensable object in the everyday lives of the Japanese, thanks to its ability to provide regular news and information to drivers on the road.

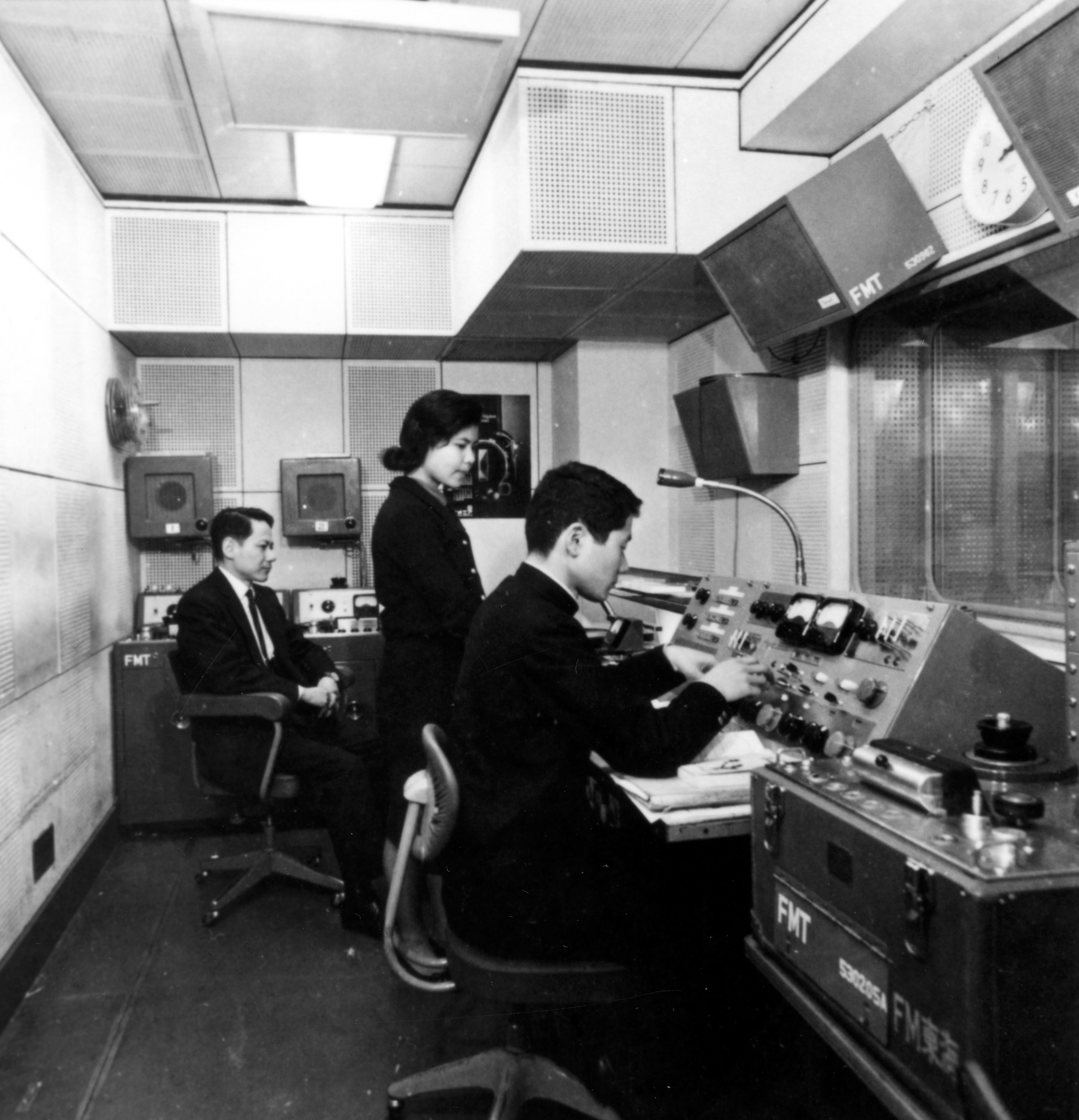
FM Tokai (now Tokyo FM) broadcasting tests in 1965

In the meantime, the Ministry of Communications had granted the FM broadcasting licence to NHK on an experimental basis, and by 1968 the network covered almost 80% of the country. NHK FM started broadcasting officially in 1969, soon followed by FM Aichi Music; a year later it was the turn of FM Osaka, FM Tokyo and FM Fukuoka Music. Initially, the government did not allow more than one private radio station per prefecture, but from 1988 some of these restrictions were relaxed. Thus, in those years, J-Wave and FM 802 came into being, which started broadcasting from Tokyo and Osaka respectively. In 1993, Zip-FM (Nagoya), Cross FM (Fukuoka) and North Wave (Sapporo) were born. These, together with J-Wave and FM 802, formed the Japan FM League (JFL), which opposed the stations of the Japan FM Network (JFN) headed by FM Tokyo. The 2000s also saw an increase in the number of stations aimed specifically at foreign residents, such as InterFM in Tokyo, FM Cocolo in Osaka and Love FM in Fukuoka.

=== The era of digital and satellite radio ===
At the same time as the birth of the first satellite pay-TV in Japan, Wowow, the world's first digital satellite radio station, St. Giga, was inaugurated in December 1990 and officially started broadcasting from April 1991. Subsequently, numerous other radio stations began to provide similar services, and by the beginning of the 2000s, there were ten operational radio stations, with a total of twenty-three channels. However, between 2004 and 2006, all stations ceased operations and withdrew from the market. Even St. Giga, after several transactions, was purchased in 2003 by World Independent Networks Japan before finally shutting down in November 2007.

Meanwhile, in accordance with an amendment to the 1989 Broadcasting Act, six radio stations were allowed to start broadcasting using the normal telecommunications satellite network, starting in 1992. However, these too were short-lived, leaving only one operator, Music Bird, on the market. Only after the transition to digital broadcasting in 1998 did several other providers emerge, including SKY PerfecTV!.

=== Web radio ===
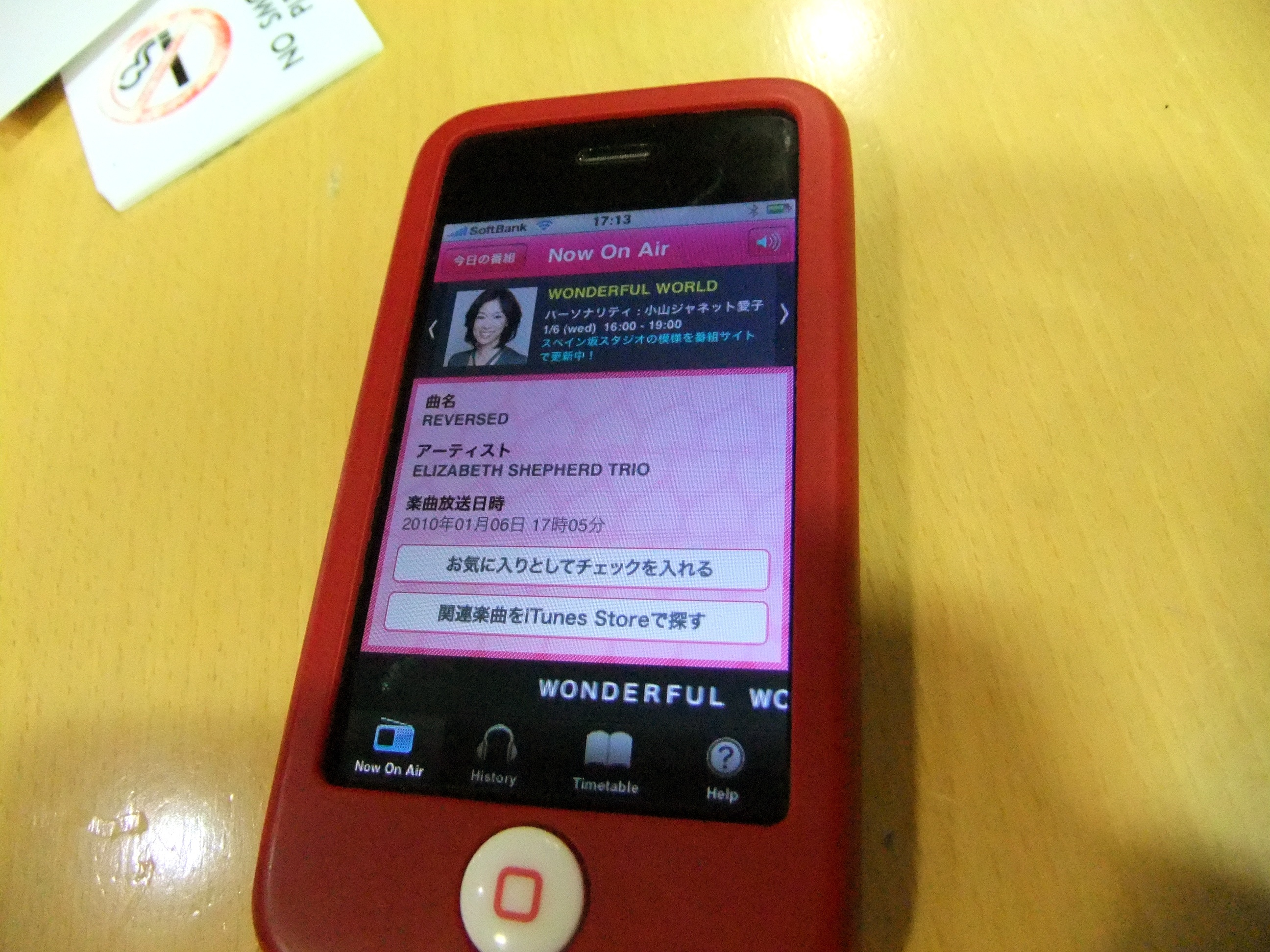
Tokyo FM's first iPhone radio application

Although Japan had been one of the pioneering countries in the early 2000s in the distribution of digital music for mobile phones through chaku-uta (music ringtones) technology, the gradual emergence of smartphones, coupled with the proliferation of illegal download websites and the subsequent reluctance of Japanese music giants to provide free content via the web, eventually led to a stalemate in the market for online music services in Japan. Popular music distribution applications such as iTunes, Napster and Mixi's radio service struggled to make inroads into the Japanese market.

As of 2011, the most downloaded radio application was FM Tokyo, followed at a distance by SuonoDolce (a free service of the Nippon Broadcasting System), Community FM, the iPhone version of Community Simul Radio Alliance and i-Radio.fm. Another popular app is Radiko (owned by Dentsu), whose paid service was launched in 2008. However, the popularity of these apps is much lower than in countries such as the United States, which highlights a certain lack of interest in the radio medium among the Japanese in the contemporary age.

== Usage and diffusion ==
In Japan, only a fraction of the population listens to the radio frequently, with less than 40% listening to the radio at least once a week. The Japanese tend to spend more time reading print media (newspapers, magazines, books, manga) or on their mobile phones than listening to radio programmes. An NHK survey in 1952 revealed that the Japanese spent an average of about four hours a day listening to the radio; by 2009, this had dropped to less than 40 minutes a day. In the capital Tokyo, where there are more radio stations, the average rises to around 100 minutes a day.

Those who spend the most time listening to the radio are the over-60s, i.e. the generation that grew up when radio was the main mass medium, while the latter struggles to attract the younger generation. Television in Japan in fact was not introduced until 1953, and only reached 20 million viewers (about one fifth of the population at the time) in 1967. In 1932, however, there were already more than 1.4 million radio receivers, while in 1954 there were more than eleven million radio listeners.

The audience gap between the younger and older generations is equally marked between men and women, where the business world of the salaryman is strictly separated from the domestic space of the housewife, whose duties favour easier access to television. For the same reason, radio is much more successful among car drivers or commuters on trains, where earphones help to create a minimal feeling of personal space.

The peak listening time is reached at 10 am, when the number of listeners temporarily exceeds the number of viewers. At midday, when private television stations broadcast their daily doramas, radio ratings fall sharply, then rise again until 4 pm, when even the most loyal listeners begin to turn their attention to television programming. At night, the audience is mainly elderly people, and the most popular programmes include NHK news programmes as well as the Japanese comedy genres of rakugo and manzai.

== Structure of radio in Japan ==
Due to strict government regulations, Japan has a relatively low number of radio stations. In general, each prefecture has two public NHK stations, one private AM station (some are also on FM) and one private FM station. Highly populated areas, such as the Kantō region or the Kansai region, may however have more stations. Several AM stations also have a licence to broadcast within their prefecture. It is not possible to listen to Japanese stations from abroad, while between prefectures this is only possible via Radiko's web service.

=== Network and transmission types ===
In addition to NHK public radio, there are 48 AM and 51 FM stations in Japan divided between various private networks (Japan Radio Network and National Radio Network in AM, Japan FM Network, Japan FM League and MegaNet in FM). There is also a community radio circuit consisting of around 300 radio stations. Local governments may also request the establishment of temporary radio stations to deal with sudden emergencies such as earthquakes and other disasters. Finally, the Japan Amateur Radio League manages the numerous amateur radio stations scattered throughout the territory under the supervision of the Ministry of Internal Affairs and Communications.

Radio stations in Japan can be either generalist or thematic. In the former case, at least 30% of the programming must be devoted to news or cultural programmes; in the latter case, a station can devote its schedule exclusively to music or educational programmes. For an educational-themed station (such as NHK Radio 2) at least 80% of the programming must be devoted to cultural programmes.

Station type	Transmission type	Network
Public (NHK)	AM	NHK AM
Public (NHK)	FM	NHK FM
Private	AM	JRN (Japan Radio Network), NRN (National Radio Network)
Private	FM	JFN (Japan FM Network), JFL (Japan FM League), MegaNet (Megalopolis Radio Network)
Private	Shortwave	Radio Nikkei
Private	Satellite	Music Bird, SKY PerfecTV!, Usen
Private	Cable	Cansystem, Usen440

=== Radio band use ===
Division of ITU regions: Japan is in the third region. Region 1 Region 2 Region 3

The use of the radio band in Japan is regulated by the Ministry of Internal Affairs and Communications under the Broadcasting Act of 1950.

Until 2011, the portion of the band allocated to FM radio broadcasting was 76 to 90 MHz, while the section from 90 to 108 MHz was dedicated to broadcasting three analogue television channels. With the transition to digital television, the portion earmarked for FM broadcasting was expanded to 95 MHz, while the rest was reserved for the introduction of future multimedia services. The first broadcaster to broadcast experimentally on the new band was Nankai Broadcasting, which began its FM programming on 3 November 2014 on the frequency of 91.7 MHz.

Japan is in the third region according to the classification of the International Telecommunication Union (ITU), which is responsible for setting standards in telecommunications and the use of radio waves. The international prefixes for communication services assigned to Japan by the ITU are JAA-JSZ, 7JA-7NZ and 8JA-8NZ.

== See also ==
- Mass media in Japan
- FM broadcasting in Japan

== Bibliography ==
- Ruth Benedict (1993). Il crisantemo e la spada. Modelli di cultura giapponese. Edizioni Dedalo.
- Victoria Bestor, Theodore C. Bestor e Akiko Yamagata, ed. (2011). Routledge Handbook of Japanese Culture and Society. Taylor & Francis.
- Jayson Makoto Chun (2006). A Nation of a Hundred Million Idiots?: A Social History of Japanese Television, 1953 - 1973. Routledge. ISBN 978-0-415-97660-2.
- Francesco Giordana (2005). "La radio". Tecnologie, media & società mediatica: evoluzioni, influenze ed effetti degli strumenti di comunicazione sulla società dagli anni '60 ai giorni nostri. FrancoAngeli.
- Masami Ito (2010). Broadcasting in Japan: Case-studies on Broadcasting Systems. Routledge.
- Gregory J. Kasza (1993). The State and the Mass Media in Japan, 1918-1945. University of California Press. ISBN 978-0-520-05943-6.
- Ellis S. Krauss (2000). Broadcasting Politics in Japan: NHK and Television News. Cornell University Press. ISBN 978-0-8014-3748-9.
- Noriko Manabe (2014). "Streaming music service in Japan". In Sumanth Gopinath e Jason Stanyek (ed.). The Oxford Handbook of Mobile Music Studies. Vol. 1. OUP USA.
- Yoshiko Nakano (2009). "Radio broadcasting". In Sandra Buckley (ed.). The Encyclopedia of Contemporary Japanese Culture. Taylor & Francis.
- Ryōta Ono (2004). "Japan". In Christopher H. Sterling (ed.). Encyclopedia of Radio. Routledge.
- Rowthorn, Chris (2010). Giappone. EDT. ISBN 9788860405463.
- Taplin, Ruth; Wakui, Masako (2006). Japanese Telecommunications: Market and Policy in Transition. Routledge.
- Atsushi Ueda, ed. (1996). Electric geisha. Tra cultura pop e tradizione in Giappone. Translated by L. Piercecchi. Feltrinelli Editore.
- Tony Verna (1999). Televisione globale. Gremese Editore.
