= Mass media in Japan =

The mass media in Japan include numerous television and radio networks as well as newspapers and magazines in Japan. For the most part, television networks were established based on capital investments by existing radio networks. Variety shows, serial dramas, and news constitute a large percentage of Japanese evening shows.

Western movies are also shown, many with a subchannel for English. There are all-English television channels on cable and satellite (with Japanese subtitles).

== Television networks ==
There are 6 nationwide television networks, as follows:

- NHK is a public service broadcaster. The company is financed through "viewer fees," similar to the licence fee system used in the UK to fund the BBC. NHK deliberately maintains neutral reporting as a public broadcast station, even refusing to mention commodity brand names. NHK has 2 terrestrial TV channels, unlike the other TV networks (in the Tokyo region—channel 1 (NHK General TV) and channel 3 (NHK Educational TV)).
- Nippon Television Network System (NNS)/Nippon News Network (NNN) headed by Nippon Television (NTV). In the Tokyo region, channel 4. Affiliated with the Yomiuri Shimbun newspaper.
- The Tokyo Broadcasting System holding company owns the Tokyo Broadcasting System (TBS) station (which is broadcast nationally) and the Japan News Network (JNN) which supplies news programming to TBS and other affiliates. In the Tokyo region, channel 6. Affiliated with the Mainichi Shimbun newspaper. Chubu-Nippon Broadcasting Co., Ltd., a quasi-key station in Nagoya, is related to the Chunichi Shimbun newspaper.
- Fuji Network System (FNS) and the Fuji News Network (FNN) share the flagship station Fuji Television. In the Tokyo region, channel 8. Part of the Fujisankei Communications Group, a keiretsu. Tokai TV, a quasi-key station in Nagoya, is related to the Chunichi Shimbun newspaper.
- TV Asahi Network/All-Nippon News Network (ANN) headed by TV Asahi. Affiliated with the Asahi Shimbun newspaper, which owns nearly 25% of the station. In the Tokyo region, channel 5.
- TV Tokyo Network (TXN) headed by TV Tokyo. Owned by Nikkei, Inc. In the Tokyo region, channel 7.

In addition, there is the Japanese Association of Independent Television Stations (JAITS), which consists of independent stations in the three major metropolitan areas (excluding Ibaraki, Shizuoka, and Osaka), and includes TV stations affiliated with the Chunichi Shimbun newspaper such as Tokyo MX and TV Kanagawa.

== Radio networks ==
=== AM radio ===
1. NHK Radio 1, NHK Radio 2
2. Japan Radio Network (JRN)—Flagship Station: TBS radio (TBSラジオ)
3. National Radio Network (NRN)—Flagship Stations: Nippon Cultural Broadcasting (文化放送) and Nippon Broadcasting System (ニッポン放送)
4. Radio Nikkei is an independent shortwave station broadcasts nationwide with two services.

=== FM radio ===
1. NHK-FM
2. Japan FM Network (JFN)—Tokyo FM Broadcasting Co., ltd.
3. Japan FM League—J-Wave Inc.
4. MegaNet—FM Interwave (InterFM)

=== See also ===
- Lists of radio stations in Asia

== Social media ==
Facebook, Twitter, Instagram, and Line, are the leading used media platforms in the Japanese industry. Line is an app used for instant communication on electronic devices. Statistics show that Facebook use in Japan is at 47.75%, X (formerly Twitter) use is at 19.33%, YouTube use is at 13.9%, Pinterest use is at 10.69%, Instagram use is at 4.93%, and Tumblr use is at 2.29%. In Japan, as of 2017, nearly 100% of residents are online, smartphone use is reaching 80%, and some form of social media is being used by over half of the population.

== Magazines ==
=== Weekly magazines ===
1. Aera (アエラ) – Centre-left
2. Friday (フライデー) – photo magazine
3. Josei Jishin (女性自身) – for women
4. Nikkei Business (日経ビジネス) – economic
5. Shūkan Asahi (週刊朝日). Liberal.
6. Shūkan Economist (週刊エコノミスト). Economic
7. Shūkan Kinyoubi (週刊金曜日). Far-left.
8. Shūkan Bunshun (週刊文春). Conservative
9. Shūkan Diamond (週刊ダイヤモンド). Economic
10. Shūkan Gendai (週刊現代) Liberal.
11. Shūkan Josei (週刊女性). For women
12. Shūkan Post (週刊ポスト). Conservative
13. Shūkan Shinchō (週刊新潮). Conservative
14. Shūkan Toyo Keizai (週刊東洋経済). Economic
15. Spa! (スパ!). Conservative
16. Sunday Mainichi (サンデー毎日). Liberal

=== Monthly magazines ===
1. Bungei Shunjuu (文藝春秋). Conservative.
2. Chuuou Kouron (中央公論). Affiliated with the Yomiuri Shimbun. Conservative.
3. Seiron (正論). Published by the Sankei Shimbun Company. Conservative.
4. Sekai (世界). Progressive.

== Newspapers ==
=== Major papers ===
1. Yomiuri Shimbun (読売新聞). Conservative. First ranked in daily circulation at around 7 million per day. The Yomiuri exchanged a special contract with The Times. Affiliated with Nippon Television. Nikkatsu Film is a grandchild company.
2. Asahi Shimbun (朝日新聞). Liberal, Third way. Second ranked in daily circulation at around 5 million copies per day. Group companies include Toei (de facto), Asahi Broadcasting Company, TV Asahi, and Asahi Net.
3. Mainichi Shimbun (毎日新聞). Centre-left, Keynesian. Fifth ranked in daily circulation—around 2 million per day. Although the capital tie-up with Mainichi Broadcasting System / Tokyo Broadcasting System has been dissolved, it is still a friendship company that exchanges employees and cooperates with the press. In 2020, the circulation was overtaken by the Chunichi Shimbun alone (Tōkai version), which does not include the Tokyo Shimbun. Deep relationship with Kodansha and Shochiku Film.
4. Nikkei Shimbun (日本経済新聞). Center, Economic liberal with more centre-right. Fourth ranked in daily circulation at around 2 million copies per day. Economic paper in the style of The Wall Street Journal. Affiliated with TV Tokyo.
5. Sankei Shimbun (産経新聞). Right-wing. Sankei Shimbun also publishes Sankei Sports and the tabloid Yukan Fuji. It belongs to the Fujisankei Communications Group, a media conglomerate.

=== Regional papers ===
- Chunichi Shimbun/Tokyo Shimbun (中日新聞/東京新聞). Center-left to left-wing. Largest regional paper. Third ranked in daily circulation at around 2 million copies per day. In the Kanto region, the group publishes Tokyo Shimbun(東京新聞). Chunichi Shimbun is published in most of the Chubu and Kanto regions, and is a leading newspaper based in Nagoya.

Other nationally known regional papers include Nishinippon Shimbun (西日本新聞) in Kyushu, Hokkaido Shimbun (北海道新聞) in Hokkaido, Chugoku Shimbun (中国新聞) in Chugoku.

=== Nonprofit newsrooms ===
- Tokyo Investigative Newsroom Tansa, Japan's first nonprofit newsroom. Tansa was founded in 2017 by former Asahi Shimbun journalist Makoto Watanabe. The paper is the only Japanese investigative nonprofit in the Global Investigative Journalism Network.

=== Specialty papers ===
Among niche newspapers are publications like the widely circulated Nikkan Kogyo Shimbun (The Business and Technology Daily News), the Buddhist organization Sōka Gakkai's daily Seikyo Shimbun (聖教新聞), and Shimbun Akahata, the daily organ of the Japanese Communist Party. Other niches include papers devoted entirely to predicting the results of horse races. One of the best-known papers in the genre is Keiba Book (競馬ブック). Shūkan Go (週刊碁) is a weekly newspaper that covers the results of professional Go tournaments and contains hints on Go strategy.

As in other countries, surveys tend to show that the number of newspaper subscribers is declining, a trend which is expected to continue.

=== Claims of media bias ===
Claims of media bias in Japanese newspapers and the mainstream media in general are often seen on blogs and right-leaning Internet forums, where the "mass media" (masu-komi (abbreviation of mass communication) in Japanese) are often referred to as "mass garbage" (masu-gomi). Signs with this epithet were carried by demonstrators in Tokyo on 24 October 2010, at what was reportedly the first demonstration in Japan to be organized on Twitter. Among the general public, the credibility of the press suffered after the Fukushima Daiichi Nuclear Power Plant crisis, when reporters failed to press government and industry sources for more information, and official reports turned out to be inaccurate or simply wrong. Kazuo Hizumi, a journalist turned lawyer, details structural problems in his book, 「マスコミはなぜマスゴミと呼ばれるのか？」, "Masukomi wa naze masugomi to yobareru no ka?", ("Why is mass media called mass garbage?"), which argues that a complex network of institutions, such as elite bureaucrats, judiciary, education system, law enforcement, and large corporations, all of whom stand to gain from maintaining the status quo, shapes the mass media and communication in a way that controls Japanese politics and discourages critical thinking.

== Key stations: television and radio ==
In Japan, there are five broadcasting stations which take the lead in the network of commercial broadcasting. The five stations are Nippon Television, Tokyo Broadcasting System, Fuji Television, TV Asahi, and TV Tokyo. Their head offices are in Tokyo, and they are called zaikyō kī kyoku (在京キー局, Key stations in Tokyo) or kī kyoku (キー局, Key stations).

The key stations make news shows and entertainment programs, and wholesale them to local broadcasting stations through the networks. Although local broadcasting stations also manufacture programs, the usage of the key stations is very large, and 55.7% of the TV program total sales in the 2002 fiscal year (April 2002 to March 2003) were sold by the key stations. Furthermore, the networks are strongly connected with newspaper publishing companies, and they influence the media very strongly. For this reason, they are often criticized.

In addition, there is CS broadcasting and Internet distribution by the subsidiaries of the key stations. The definition of key station has changed a little in recent years.

=== Outline ===
In Japan, every broadcasting company (except NHK and Radio Nikkei) which performs terrestrial television broadcasts has an appointed broadcast region. In Article 2 of the Japanese Broadcasting Law (放送法), the Ministry of Internal Affairs and Communications defines the fixed zone where the broadcast of the same program for every classification of broadcast is simultaneously receivable. So, the broadcasting company constructs a network with other regions, and with this network establishes the exchange of news or programs. The broadcasting companies which send out many programs to these networks are called key stations.

Presently the broadcasting stations located in Tokyo send out the programs for the whole country. However, although Tokyo MX is in the Tokyo region, it is only a Tokyo region UHF independent station.

Broadcasting stations in Nagoya and other areas are older than those in Tokyo. However, in order to meet the large costs of making programs key stations were established in Tokyo to sell programs nationwide. Some local stations have a higher profit ratio since they can merely buy programs from the networks.

==== Sub-key stations ====
Since the broadcasting stations which assign the head offices in Kansai region (especially in Osaka) have a program supply frame at prime time etc. and sent out many programs subsequently to kī kyoku, they are called jun kī kyoku (準キー局, sub-key stations).

=== List of key stations ===
Media	Network	Kī kyoku (Kantō)	Jun kī kyoku (Kansai)	Kikan kyoku (Tōkai)	Ref.
Terrestrial television	Nippon News Network (NNN)	Nippon Television (NTV)	Yomiuri Telecasting Corporation (ytv)	Chūkyō Television Broadcasting (CTV)	
Terrestrial television	Japan News Network (JNN)	Tokyo Broadcasting System (TBS)	Mainichi Broadcasting System (MBS)	Chubu-Nippon Broadcasting (CBC)	
Terrestrial television	Fuji News Network (FNN)	Fuji Television (CX)	Kansai Telecasting Corporation (KTV)	Tōkai Television Broadcasting (THK)	
Terrestrial television	All-Nippon News Network (ANN)	TV Asahi (EX)	Asahi Broadcasting Corporation (ABC)	Nagoya Broadcasting Network (Mētere・NBN)	
Terrestrial television	TV Tokyo Network (TXN)	TV Tokyo (TX)	Television Osaka (TVO)	Aichi Television Broadcasting (TVA)	
AM Radio	Japan Radio Network (JRN)	TBS Radio & Communications (TBS R&C)	Mainichi Broadcasting System (MBS); Asahi Broadcasting Corporation (ABC)	Chubu-Nippon Broadcasting (CBC)	
AM Radio	National Radio Network (NRN)	Nippon Cultural Broadcasting (QR); Nippon Broadcasting System (LF)	Mainichi Broadcasting System (MBS); Asahi Broadcasting Corporation (ABC); Osaka Broadcasting Corporation (Radio Osaka, OBC)	Tokai Radio Broadcasting (SF)	
FM Radio	JFN	Tokyo FM	fm osaka	FM Aichi	
FM Radio	JFL	J-WAVE	FM802	ZIP-FM	
FM Radio	MegaNet	InterFM	FM Cocolo	Radio-i	

== Advertising agencies ==
1. Dentsu (電通). The largest advertising agency in Japan, and the fourth-largest worldwide. Dentsu has an enormous presence in television and other media, and has strong ties to the legislative branch of government.
2. Hakuhodo (博報堂). The second-largest Japanese advertising agency. Advertisement agencies under its umbrella include Daiko (大広) and Yomiko Advertising (読売広告社, Yomiuri Kōkokusha). Also known as Showgate, the film production division.
3. CyberAgent (サイバーエージェント, Saibā Ējento) The third-largest Japanese advertising agency, that is mainly Internet advertising.
4. Asatsu-DK (アサツー ディ・ケイ). The fourth-largest Japanese advertising agency. a subsidiary of Bain Capital, LP.

== Wire services ==
1. Jiji Press (時事通信).
2. Kyodo News (共同通信).
3. Radio Press (ラヂオプレス)

== See also ==
- Anime
- Censorship in Japan
- Cinema of Japan
- Manga
- Media mix
- Tokusatsu
- Video games in Japan
- The staff ate it later
