= Kamasami Kong =

American disc jockey

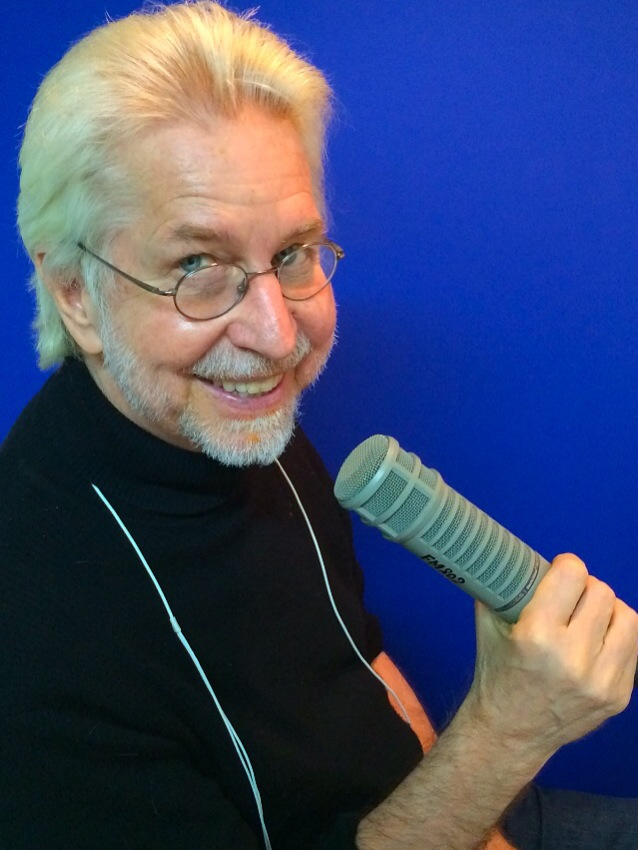
- Kong in 2017
- Born: Robert W. Zix; December 21, 1949 (age 76); Hamilton, Ohio, United States
- Occupations: Disc jockey, radio personality
- Years active: 1965–present
- Presenting career
- Show: The Kong Show
- Station: Love FM
- Time slot: 19:00–21:00 Sunday
- Show: Kamasami Kong Show
- Station: FM Cocolo
- Time slot: 24:00–01:00 Sunday
- Country: Japan

Robert W. Zix (born December 21, 1949), known professionally as Kamasami Kong, is an American disc jockey and radio host. Previously a host for the Hawaii radio station KIKI, Kong has since moved to Tokyo, Japan to continue his career. Kong's broadcast style and distinct voice led him to get a cult following in Japan due to him playing city pop in Hawaii in the genre's early stages, as well as lending his voice to multiple city pop compilation albums.

== Early life and education ==
Kong was born Robert W. Zix on December 21, 1949, in Hamilton, Ohio. He developed an interest in radio at an early age, starting his own amateur radio for his neighborhood as a teenager. During the Vietnam War, he was drafted and became a disc jockey for the American Forces Network in South Korea. During his time in South Korea, he was able to listen to the Japanese radio program All Night Nippon with Katsuya Kobayashi. After the war ended, he moved to Honolulu from Oregon the year after and started his radio career there.

== Career ==
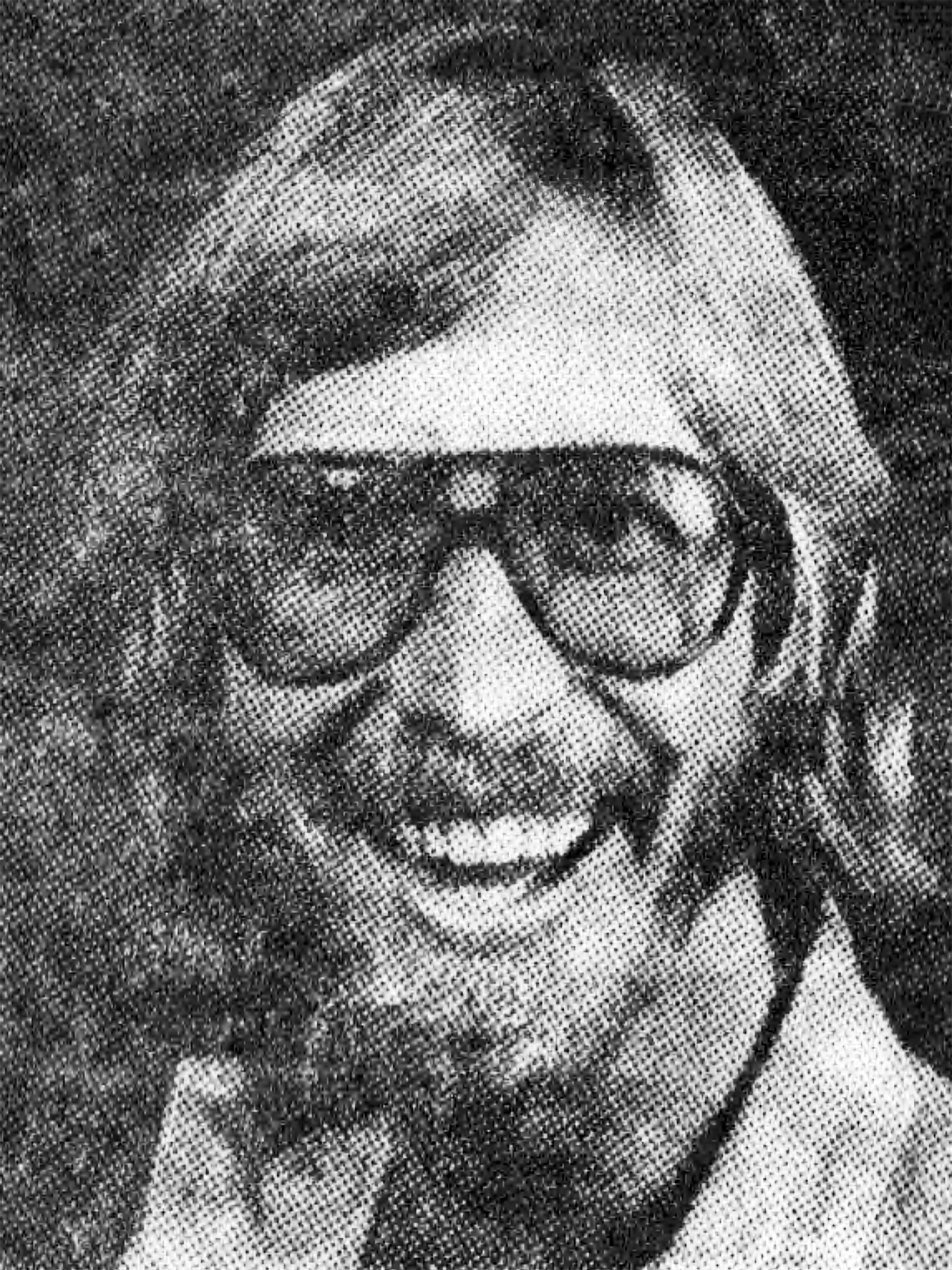
Kong in 1980 in an announcement of KDEO Radio 94.

Kong began his radio career in 1965 with the radio station WMOH before moving to Hawaii in the 1970s. Kong explained that the program director wanted him to have the name Jack Stone, which he disliked and was tasked with coming up with his new name. He wanted a name that was also an onomatopoeia, and after hearing the sound of a gong, he decided to give himself the name Gong. He also explained that one day, a little girl had called and misinterpreted his slogan, "I call myself Gong!" as the name Kamasami Kong, and he chose the name moving forward. In early programs, he used the intro of the song "King Kong" by The Jimmy Castor Bunch as the lyric "Komo Sambe Kong!" was similar to his name.

In 1978, Kong became the first host of the new show Hawaiian Moving Company, being replaced by Michael W. Perry after two seasons.

By the late 1970s, Kong's shows were being recorded by Japanese listeners in Hawaii and brought back to Japan, where they sold bootleg cassette tapes of Kong. The sales of the tapes led Kong to have a cult following in Japan, and in 1979, CBS/Sony approached Kong to create an album based on Kong speaking as if he was hosting his show, but with no music as to allow listeners to create their own shows with Kong's voice. The album, Disc Jockey In Hawaii, helped propel Kong to stardom in Japan. In 1982, he was featured in the album Surf Break from Sea Breeze by Toshiki Kadomatsu, where he talked over the songs from Kadomatsu's album Sea Breeze as if it was his radio show, and would later do the same for multiple other albums.

After moving to Japan in 2005, Kong has hosted The Kong Show on Love FM and Kamasami Kong Show on FM Cocolo. In 2015, he was featured on the album Pacific Oasis, and in 2023, he was featured on the album FM Station 8090, which followed previous DJ albums and compiled various city pop songs.

In 2005, Kong moved from Hawaii to Osaka due to frustration with the U.S. stations, where he became a DJ for JOFV-FM while being sponsored by Mitsubishi Motors. He wasn't allowed to be streamed except for a KTUH alumni show.

== Personal life ==
Before moving to Japan, Kong had lived in Hawaii and traveled from Hawaii to Japan multiple times. Kong was successfully treated for melanoma in 2012 but advised to stay out of the sun.

== Credits ==
=== Radio ===
Year	Show
2021–present	Kamasami Kong Show
2018–present	The Kong Show
1989–1998	Pacific Oasis
2010–2021	Pacific Oasis
2016	Cotton Club Music Tree
2010	Radio-i Kamasami Kong Show
2006–2009	Eternity
2005–2006	On Saturday Kamasami Ride Kong Show

=== Music ===
Year	Artist	Title
1979	Kamasami Kong	D.J In Hawaii
1984	Toshiki Kadomatsu	Summer Time Romance ~ From Kiki
1984	Toshiki Kadomatsu	Come Along II
1985	S. Kiyotaka & Omega Tribe	Kamasami Kong DJ Special
1986	Toshiki Kadomatsu	Surf Break From Sea Breeze ~ D.J. Special

=== Film ===
Year	Film	Role
1984	Big Wave	Narrator

=== Television ===
Year(s)	Show	Role
1978–2004	Hawaiian Moving Company	Host
1980	Brown Bags to Stardom	Host
1984	Breakin' Hawaii	Host
