= Cross FM =

Radio station in Fukuoka, Japan

JORV-FM クロスエフエム
- Fukuoka; Japan
- Broadcast area: Kyūshū
- Frequency: 78.7 MHz
- Branding: Cross FM

Programming
- Language: Japanese
- Format: Full service; contemporary hit radio
- Affiliations: JFL

Ownership
- Owner: Cross FM Co., Ltd.

History
- First air date: September 1, 1993
- Former names: FM Kyūshū (1993–2008)

Technical information
- Power: 3 kW
- Repeaters: 77 MHz (Kitakyūshū); 86.5 MHz (Kurume); 87.8 MHz (Ōmuta); 87.2 MHz (Yukuhashi)

Links
- Webcast: crossfmkitakyushunow on Ustream
- Website: http://www.crossfm.co.jp/

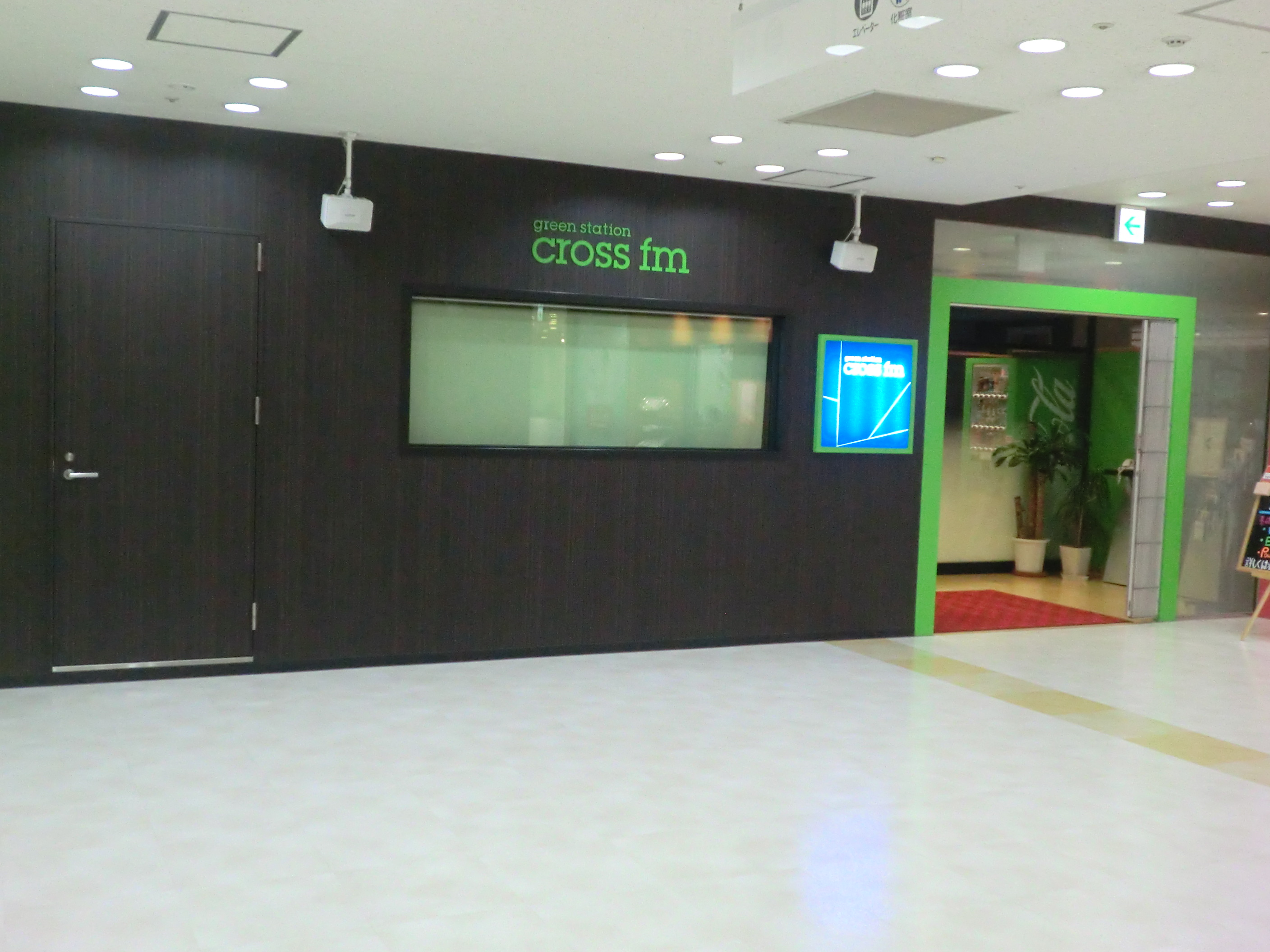
CROSS FM headquarters

Cross FM (クロスエフエム, kurosu efu emu) (formerly FM Kyūshū (エフエム九州, efu emu kyūshū)) is a commercial radio station operating in the Fukuoka Prefecture of Japan. It is an affiliate of the Japan FM League.

== History ==
Cross FM Co., Ltd.
- Type: private
- Industry: radio broadcasting
- Founded: December 9, 1992 (as FM Kyūshū Co. Ltd.)
- Headquarters: Fukuoka, Japan
- Area served: Kyūshū
- Key people: Hisao Tateishi (chairman/representative director); Wakako Tokuda (CEO); Yoshitaka Hombo; Shigeki Suzuki
- Products: radio broadcasting credit cards (in partnership with Circle K Sunkus and JCB)
- Services: radio broadcasting
- Owner: Takafumi Horie
- Website: http://www.crossfm.co.jp/

- December 9, 1992 - FM Kyūshū Co. Ltd. was founded.
- April 2004 - FM Kyūshū sets up a studio at the Hakata Station called JR Hakata Giga Studio (JR博多駅GIGAスタジオ, jei aru hakata-eku giga sutajio).
- June 30, 2008 - FM Kyūshū signed off for some changes.
- July 1, 2008 - FM Kyūshū relaunches as Cross FM.
- April 28, 2016 - Cross FM was acquired by DHC Corp.
- September 2023 - Cross FM was acquired by local businessman Takafumi Horie, with Horie becoming its chairman replacing DHC's Yoshiaki Yoshida and his business partner as the CEO. A stock transfer agreement was held on September 6, where Horie and two parties agreed to acquire Cross FM's shares from DHC.

== Navigators ==
- Hisae Aigoshi
- Alice
- Maki Ariga
- D-High-LoW
- fumika
- Funkist
- Honey
- Racer Kashima
- Natsuko Kondo
- Makoto Kosaka
- Yuta Kozuma
- Zentaro Kurita
- Lucy
- Masaki
- Akiko Matsumoto
- The Mercury Sound
- Moby
- Tetsuzo Motoki
- Mye
- Ryuta Nobukawa
- Pe'z
- Prague
- Shirley Tomioka-Sheridan (see also FM802)
- Ritsuko Tateyama
- Toggy
- Shion Tsuji
- Yayoi Tsuruta
- Toru Yagi
- Marico Yamamoto

== See also ==
- Japan FM League

=== Other stations in Fukuoka ===
- FM Fukuoka (JFN)
- Love FM (MegaNet)
