= Radio NEO =

Radio station in Aichi Prefecture, Japan, 2014–2020

JOCW-FM
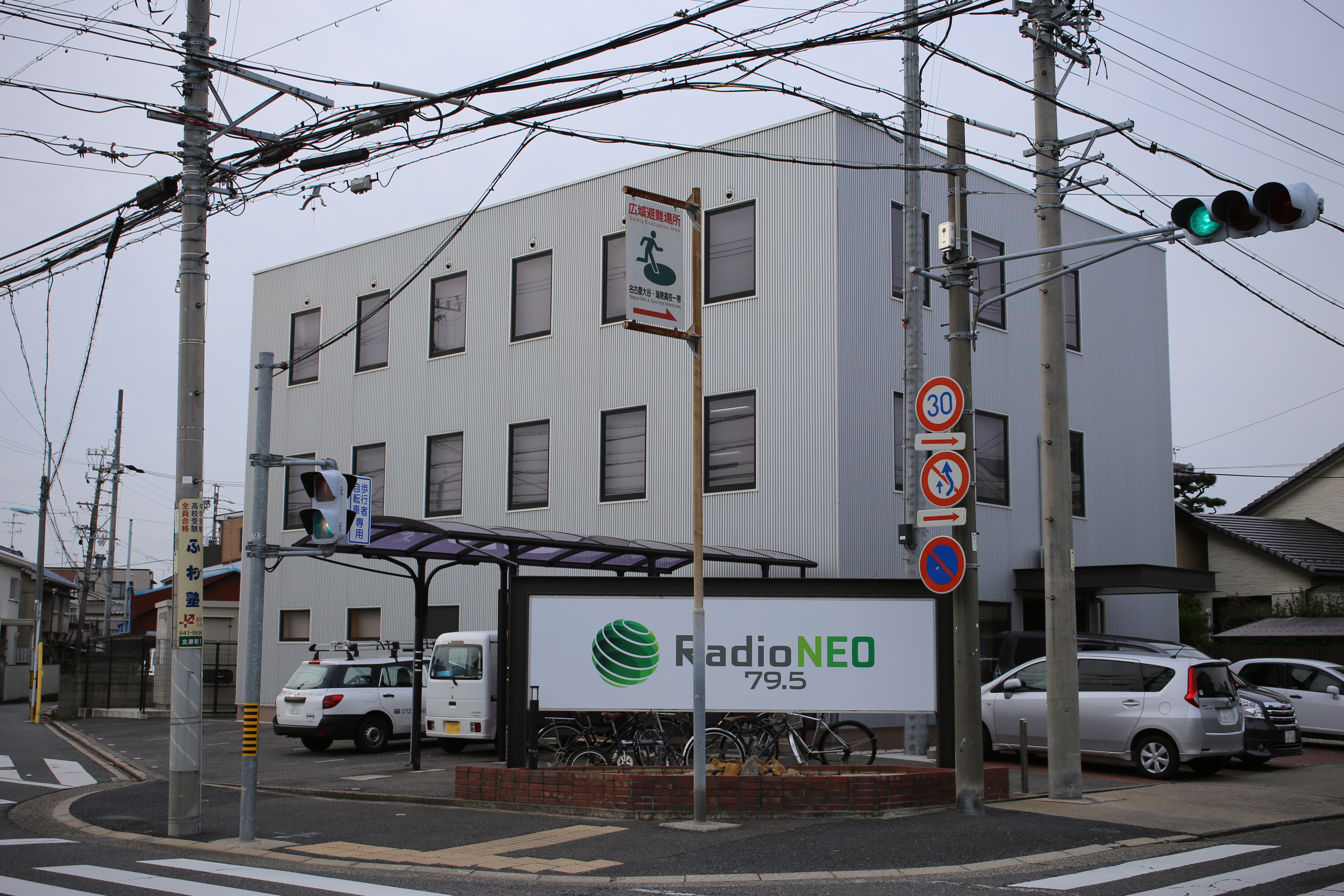
- Nagoya, Aichi Prefecture; Japan
- Broadcast area: Aichi Prefecture
- Frequency: 79.5 MHz
- Branding: Radio Neo

Programming
- Language: Multiethnic
- Format: World ethnic, Top 40 and album-oriented rock
- Affiliations: Megalopolis Radio Network

Ownership
- Owner: Radio NEO Corporation; (Radio NEO Corporation)

History
- First air date: April 1, 2014
- Last air date: June 30, 2020

Technical information
- Power: 5 kW
- HAAT: 856 meters

Radio Neo (JOCW-FM), stylized Radio NEO, was a multilingual commercial radio station based in central Japan in Nagoya, Aichi Prefecture.

It was set up in 2014 to fill in the gap left by the former Kowa Company-owned station Radio-i, which shut down in 2010 and using the same frequency and transmitter; and was originally a local subsidiary of the Tokyo-based InterFM. On August 25, 2016, a separate company, Radio NEO Corporation, was created, which took over operations of the station on December 1, 2016. Due to financial difficulties and the decision taken by Kinoshita Corporation, its owner, to exit the radio business, it shut down on June 30, 2020. The physical company was liquidated in 2022 and its legal entity ceased to exist.

== History ==
Radio-i, the original MegaNet station for Aichi Prefecture, shut down on September 30, 2010. On October 30, 2012, the Tokyo station InterFM announced its intent to register for a radio license in Nagoya with its launch target being spring of 2014. The negotiations with the Ministry of Internal Affairs and Communications was initially scheduled for May to July 2013; the regulator accepted the license on August 6, 2013 and the license was issued on October 25, 2013, using the name InterFM NAGOYA. The license was approved on March 20, 2024. Broadcasts started on April 1, 2014. Unlike Radio-i, the station had no relay transmitters in Hamamatsu and Toyohashi.

On October 1, 2015, the station was renamed Radio NEO, aiming to localize its profile. On December 1, 2016, the station was put up under Radio NEO Corporation.

On March 31, 2020, the station announced on its website that it would shut down effective June 30 at noon. Simultaneously, the station was removed from Radiko, alongside FM PORT, which shut down on the same day. The company was finally liquidated on February 25, 2022.
