= LOVE FM =

LOVE FM may refer to one of FM broadcasting stations:

- LOVE FM (Belize), a radio station based in Belize City, Belize
- Love FM (Japan) (a.k.a. JOFW-FM), a radio station based in Fukuoka City, Japan
