= Aichi International Broadcasting =

JOGW-FM
- Nagoya, Aichi Prefecture; Japan
- Broadcast area: Aichi Prefecture
- Frequency: 79.5 MHz
- Branding: Radio-I

Programming
- Language: Multiethnic
- Format: Defunct(was World ethnic, Top 40 and Album-oriented rock)
- Affiliations: Megalopolis Radio Network

Ownership
- Owner: Kowa Co., Ltd.; (Aichi International Broadcasting Co., Ltd.)

History
- First air date: April 1, 2000
- Last air date: September 30, 2010

Technical information
- Power: 5 kW
- HAAT: 856 meters
- Translators: 79.9 FM in Hamamatsu and southern Shizuoka Prefecture; 83.0 FM in the southern districts of Aichi Prefecture from Toyohashi

Radio-i (JOGW-FM) was a multilingual commercial radio station based in central Japan in Nagoya, Aichi Prefecture, owned by the Kowa Company.

Nagoya University cited this station along with rival ZIP-FM (JFL, 77.8 MHz) as sources of multilingual information during emergencies. In times of disaster the station could broadcast vital information to listeners in Chinese, English, Simple Japanese, Korean, Portuguese, Spanish and Tagalog.

Set up as Aichi International Broadcasting (愛知国際放送, Aichi Kokusai Hoso), Radio-i commenced operations on April 1, 2000, and was the third of a series of radio stations created to bring a more international scope to local regions across Japan (they form the MegaNet.) The station broadcast on three frequencies, 79.5 FM in Nagoya and across Aichi Prefecture, 79.9 FM in Hamamatsu and southern Shizuoka Prefecture, and on 83.0 FM in the southern districts of Aichi Prefecture from Toyohashi. Playing a mixture of Top 40 and Album-oriented rock formats, Radio-i featured a team of mostly bilingual radio DJs handling the main programs.

Citing falling advertising revenue and ratings in the Aichi region, Radio-i ceased broadcasting operations on September 30, 2010, after 10 years and 5 months on the air. After a 17-hour live broadcast featuring current and past DJs, the last song played was ABBA - "Thank You For the Music", and broadcasting ceased at midnight after station ID. With the loss of carrier at 12:02 am, Radio-i became the first civilian radio station in the history of Japanese peacetime broadcasting to completely cease operations.

At the time the station closed, the DJ lineup featured Cocoro in the mornings, afternoons had Australian DJ Chris Glenn followed by Eri Sano, with evenings DJ'd by Yuko Takeda. Other main DJs included Hana Shintani and Sudo Ryumi. The Sorensen Media Group in Guam provided some of the original radio programming for both Radio-i Nagoya and InterFM Tokyo.

== See also ==
- Radio NEO
