= Asahi Broadcasting Aomori =

JOAH-DTV

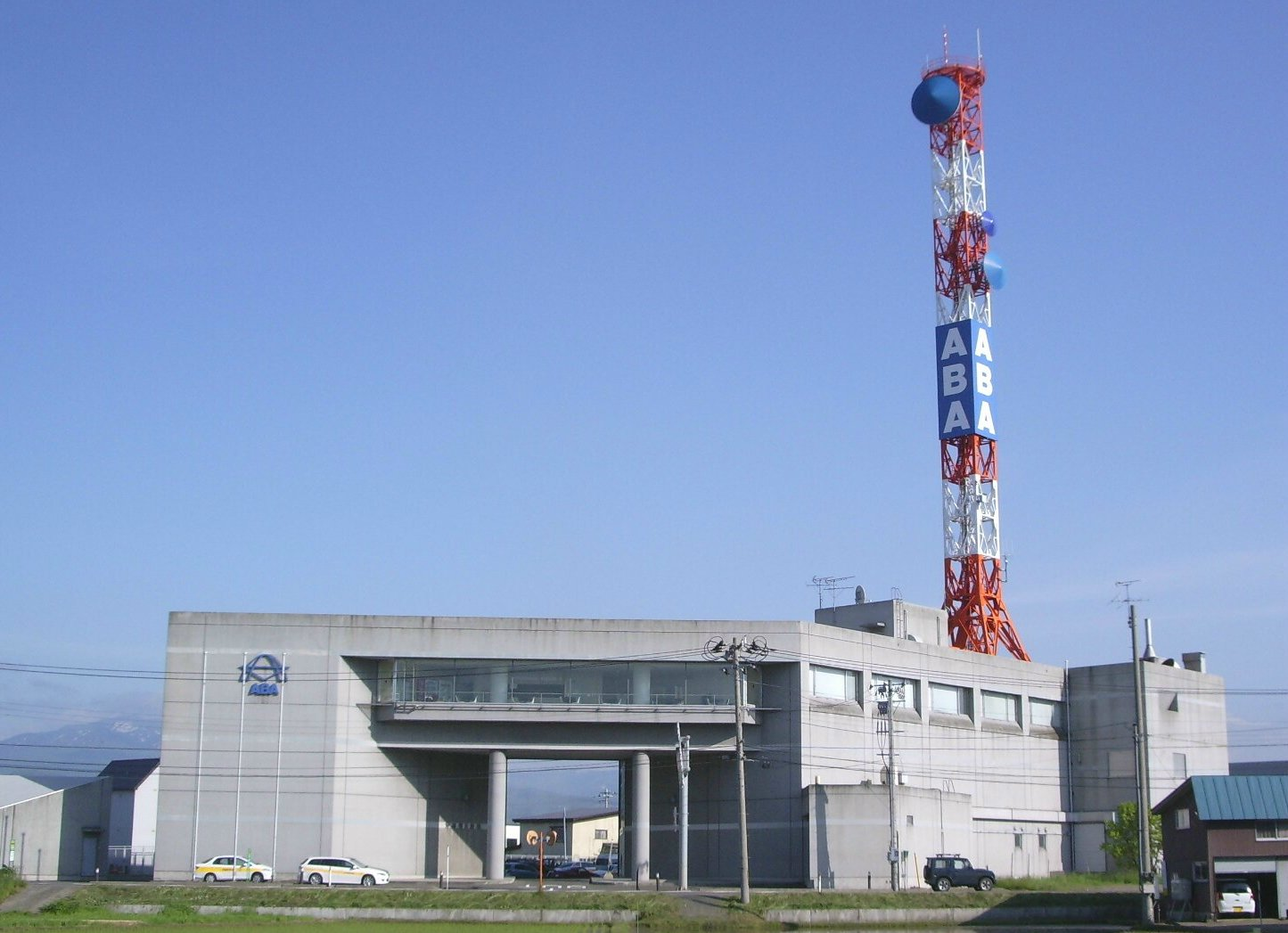
- Headquarters in Arakawa, Aomori
- Aomori Prefecture; Japan
- City: Aomori
- Channels: Digital: 32 (UHF); Virtual: 5
- Branding: ABA

Programming
- Language: Japanese
- Affiliations: All-Nippon News Network

Ownership
- Owner: Asahi Broadcasting Aomori Co., Ltd.

History
- Founded: May 15, 1990
- First air date: October 1, 1991
- Former call signs: JOAH-TV (1991–2011)
- Former channel numbers: Analog: 34 (UHF, 1991–2011)
- Call sign meaning: JO (required prefix); Aomori Asahi Housou (name of broadcaster)

Technical information
- Licensing authority: MIC

Links
- Website: aba-net.com

Asahi Broadcasting Aomori Co., Ltd. (青森朝日放送株式会社, Aomori Asahi Hōsō Kabushiki-gaisha), also known as ABA, is a Japanese broadcast network affiliated with the ANN. It broadcasts to Aomori Prefecture from studio facilities located in Aomori City.

== History ==
In the 1990s, the opening of new Heisei stations led to the growing impetus for the creation of a third commercial television station in Aomori Prefecture. The Asahi Shimbun invested in ABA's establishment and had its launching costs evaluated at approximately six billion yen.

- October 1, 1991 - Station launch.
- July 1, 2006 - Start of digital terrestrial television service (Aomori main station).
- July 24, 2011 - All analog TV stations were abolished.
