= Kowa (company) =

Trading company in Japan

Kowa Company, Ltd
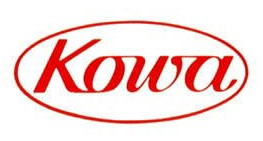
- Kowa logo

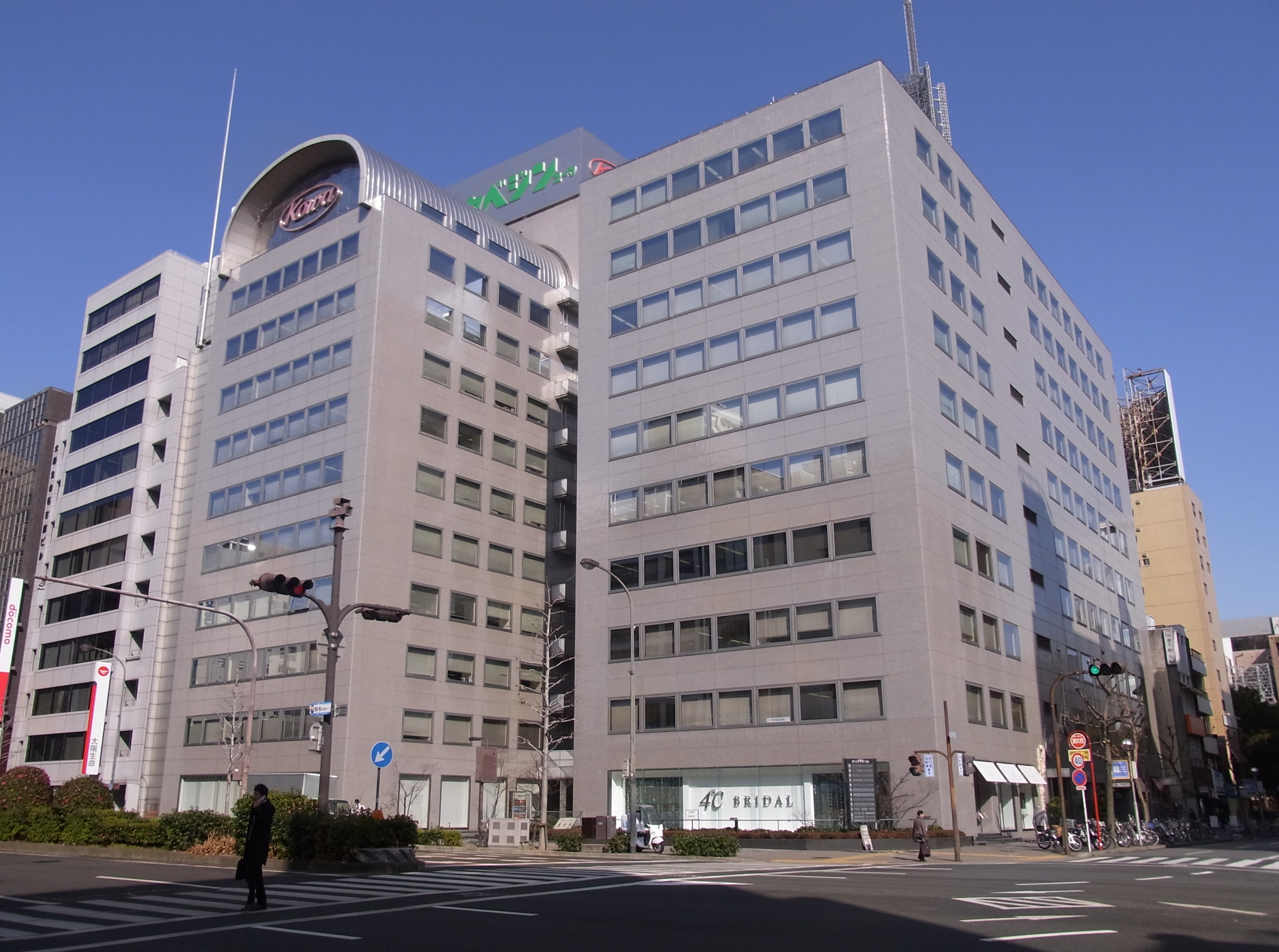
- Kowa headquarters
- Native name: 興和株式会社
- Founded: 1 January 1894; 132 years ago in Nagoya, Japan
- Founder: Hattori Kensaburo
- Headquarters: Nagoya, Japan
- Area served: Worldwide
- Products: binoculars, telescopes, mediacal optics, photocameras
- Website: https://www.kowa.co.jp/

Kowa (Japanese: 興和株式会社, Kōwa Kabushiki-gaisha), later Kowa Company, Ltd. (Japanese: 興和株式会社), is a Japanese company, a specialized trading company and manufacturer, founded in 1894 in Nagoya. Originally established in the textile sector, it later diversified into pharmaceuticals, optics, and precision instruments.

Kowa manufactured photo cameras from 1954 to 1978 and continued to make binoculars, telescopes and mediacal optics. Its headquarters are located in Nagoya, the capital of Japan's Aichi prefecture.

== Overview ==
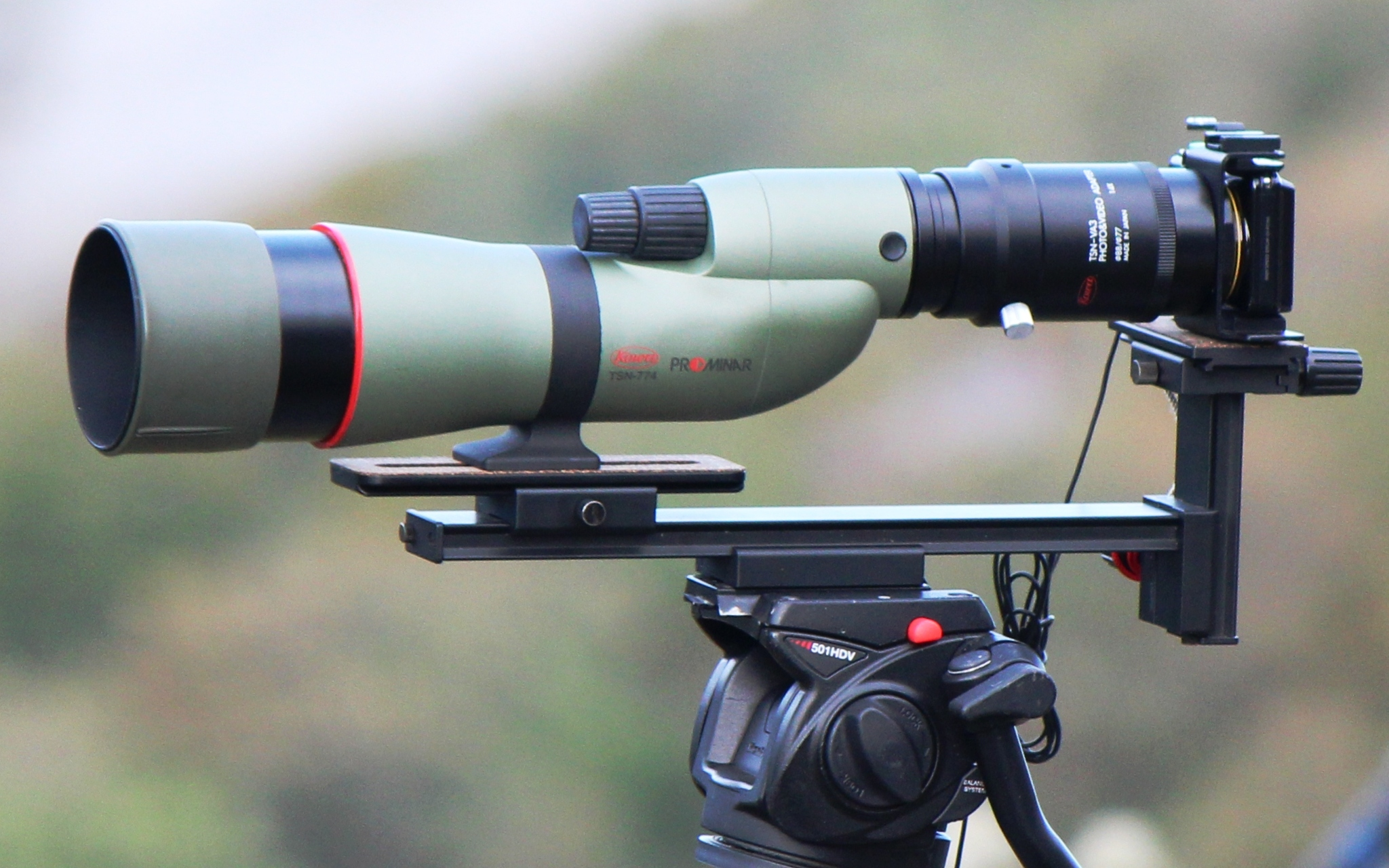
A Kowa TSN-774 spotting scope being used for digiscoping.

Kowa Company is the core of the umbrella Kowa Group. Other companies within the group include Kowa's sibling firm Kowabo Company, Ltd. and the consolidated subsidiary Kowa Pharmaceutical Company, Ltd.. Its predecessor, Hattori Kensaburo Shoten, notably supported the industrialist Sakichi Toyoda's development of his automatic loom. The business is divided into trading and manufacturing divisions. The trading company division trades in fibers, machines, building materials, watercraft, mineral resources, chemical materials, and everyday goods. Meanwhile, the manufacturing division produces medicine, medical equipment, optical instruments, and energy-saving products.

Marketing of Kowa medical products under such brand names as Colgen Kowa and Cabagin Kowa via nationwide TV commercials increased the company's brand recognition. The company also manufactures and sells Prominar-brand camera lenses, spotting scopes, and video equipment that is used by NHK and various commercial TV and radio stations.

Kowa is the largest shareholder in both Bull-Dog Sauce Co. and Meito Sangyo Co., with which it shares cross ownership. The company also owned the now-defunct radio station RADIO-i.

== History ==
Founded in 1894 in Nagoya as Hattori Kanesaburo Wholesale Store, Kowa was originally established in the textile sector. It later diversified into pharmaceuticals, optics, and precision instruments. In the field of photography, Kowa is primarily known for manufacturing cameras and photographic lenses from the late 1950s through the 1970s, through its division Kowa Optical Works (later reorganized as Kowa Company Ltd. for the optics sector).

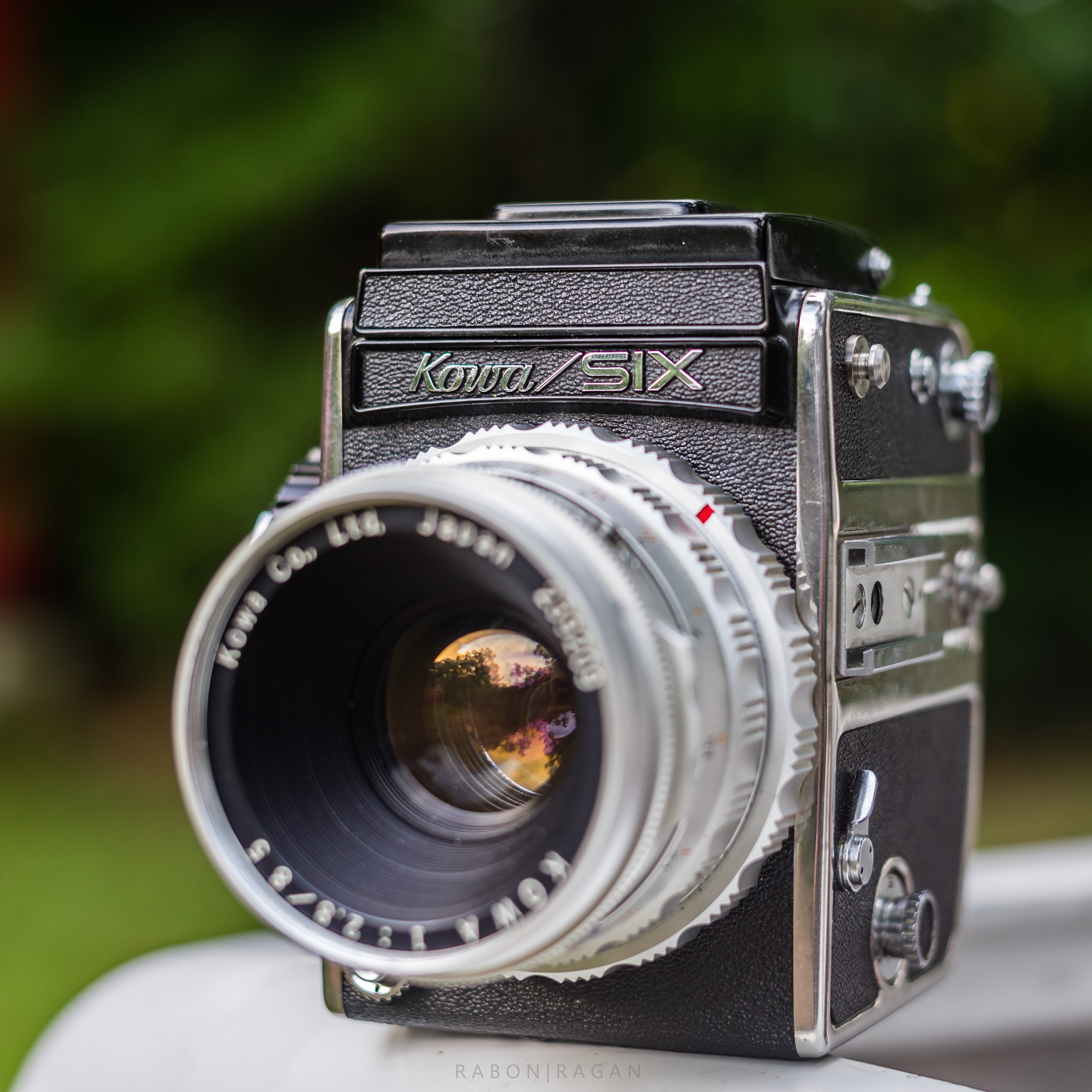
Kowa Six SLR camera.

Its most significant contribution was the line of 35 mm single-lens reflex cameras (Kowa SE) and especially the Kowa Six series (introduced in 1968), a medium-format 6×6 cm system with interchangeable lenses and a leaf shutter (Seikosha) built into the body — a design similar to Hasselblad but considerably more affordable. The series included the Kowa Six, Kowa Six MM, and the final Super 66 model (1974).

Kowa produced a wide range of high-quality lenses (from a 19 mm wide-angle to a 500 mm telephoto) with a proprietary bayonet mount and “Kowalin” multi-coating, renowned for their sharpness and contrast. Among the most sought-after by collectors are the 55 mm f/3.5 macro and the 150 mm f/3.5.The company also manufactured 35 mm rangefinder cameras (Kowa Kallo, SW, SER) and a series of premium compact cameras (Kowa Kid, SET-R) during the 1960s and 1970s.

Camera production ceased entirely in the 1970s due to fierce competition from other Japanese manufacturers (Pentax, Nikon, Canon), and the company refocused on pharmaceuticals and optics for scientific and industrial applications. Today, Kowa remains active in the production of binoculars, spotting scopes, ophthalmic lenses, and precision optical systems, but it no longer manufactures cameras or photographic lenses for the consumer market. Its medium-format reflex cameras and vintage lenses continue to be highly prized by collectors and analog photography enthusiasts.

=== Predecessor company ===
- 1894: Fiber wholesaler Hattori Kensaburo Shoten (Japanese: 服部兼三郎商店) is established in Nagoya
- 1912: Reorganized and established as a corporation, Hattori Shoten Co., Ltd. (Japanese: 株式会社服部商店)
- 1919: Added a spinning operation
- 1920: Founder Hattori Kensaburo kills himself at age 51 after facing bankruptcy

=== Current corporation ===
- 1939: Trading division separated and established as Kaneka Hattori Shoten Company, Ltd.
- 1943: Name changed to Kofu Sangyo Company, Ltd.
- 1945: Expanded beyond textiles
- 1960: Name changed to Kowa Company, Ltd.

== Promotion ==
Kowa's mascot is a frog often referred to as Kero-chan. In 2020, Kowa acquired the naming rights for a Nagoya baseball stadium, now known as the Vantelin Dome Nagoya, after one of its pharmaceutical products.
