= ZIP FM =

Radio station in Lithuania

Coordinates: 54°42′8″N 25°13′17″E

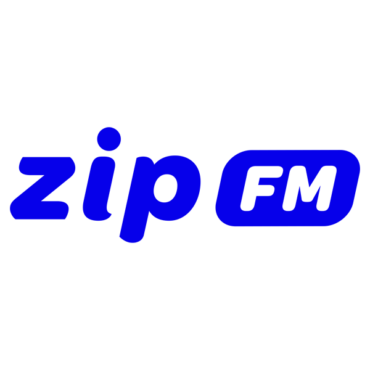
- Lithuania
- Frequency: Other

Programming
- Language: Lithuanian
- Format: Dance music, pop music

Ownership
- Owner: UAB „Radiocentras“

History
- First air date: July 1, 2005

Technical information
- Translator: 2.0

Links
- Website: http://www.zipfm.lt/

ZIP FM is a commercial radio station in Lithuania, broadcasting from the capital city of Vilnius. Started on 1 July 2005.
