= Radio Nikkei =

Japanese national shortwave radio station

Radio Nikkei (JOZ, JOZ2, JOZ3, JOZ4, JOZ5, JOZ6, JOZ7)
- Japan
- Broadcast area: nationwide

Programming
- Language: Japanese

History
- First air date: August 27, 1954
- Former names: Radio Tanpa (1954–2004)

Links
- Website: https://www.radionikkei.jp/

Current logo of the Japanese shortwave station Radio NIKKEI N°1 (In Japanese: ラジオNIKKEI第1).

Current logo for the Japanese shortwave station Radio NIKKEI N°2 and its music program, "RaNi Music" (in Japanese: ラジオNIKKEI第2, ラニィ・ミュージック), in use since 2019.

Current logo for the Japanese shortwave station Radio NIKKEI N°2 and its music program BGM, RN2 (in Japanese: ラジオNIKKEI第2, アール・エヌ・ツー), used between 2013 and 2019..

Radio Nikkei (ラジオNIKKEI, Rajio Nikkei) is Japan's nationwide free-to-air shortwave commercial radio station. It started broadcast on August 27, 1954. Radio Nikkei 2 started broadcast on September 2, 1963.

Radio Nikkei's headquarters are located at Kotohira Tower, 2-8 Toranomon 1-chōme, Minato, Tokyo. Its headquarters was previously at 9-15 Akasaka 1-chōme, Minato, Tokyo.

== Background ==
It is operated by Nikkei Radio Broadcasting Corporation (株式会社日経ラジオ社, Kabushiki-gaisha Nikkei Rajio-sha), whose main share is held by Nihon Keizai Shimbun and Tokyo Stock Exchange. The headquarters and the main studio are located at Kotohira Tower at Toranomon, Minato, Tokyo. It also has its branch office in Ōtemae, Chūō-ku, Osaka.

Along with the headquarters' studio, the studios in Tokyo are inside the Tokyo Stock Exchange and two other public satellite studios. In Osaka, it also has studios in the branch office and a satellite studio.

Besides its shortwave coverage Radio Nikkei is also available on mobile phones and online through Radiko – the platform accessible only from Japan, due to geo-blocking of non-Japanese IP addresses.

== Programming ==
The language is almost exclusively in Japanese except an English language learning programme.

The station features the following four genres as the core of its programming: finance, JRA horse racing (weekends), health-medical, and culture.

Radio Nikkei 1 is for general programs and eastern Japan horse-racing coverage. Radio Nikkei 2 is for live company stock price announcement and western Japan horse-racing coverage. Radio Nikkei 2's programming on weekdays is named Rani Music which is aimed for businesspersons at their 30s and 40s with music programs.

Although Radio Nikkei is a member of Nikkei Media Group, its programming does not have a strong connection with the group's television networks, TXN and Nikkei CNBC.

== Transmitting sites and frequencies ==
Radio Nikkei has transmitting sites in Nagara, Chiba and Nemuro, Hokkaidō.

As of April 2026, Radio Nikkei 1 broadcasts on 6.055 MHz, with a complimentary frequency on 3.925 MHz in the morning and evening hours only, while Radio Nikkei 2 broadcasts on 6.155 MHz, moving to 3.945 MHz from 7:00 p.m. Both stations have frequencies for emergency broadcasts on 9.595 MHz and 9.760 MHz respectively.
