= Independent radio =

Independent radio indicates a radio station that are run in a manner, different from usual from the countries it broadcasts in.

Conversely, in places such as the United States, where commercial broadcasters are the norm, independent radio is sometimes used to refer to non-commercial educational radio stations that are primarily supported by listener contributions and are this independent of commercial advertising concerns.

== Africa ==
Countries that allow independent radio stations include Kenya, Ethiopia and Tanzania. However, in some African countries, while independent radio is allowed, the news reports must be those produced by the government.

== United Kingdom ==
In the United Kingdom, independent radio was broadcast under permission from the Independent Broadcasting Authority.

== United States ==
With the advent of large commercial broadcast radio network companies, and the general adoption of the term public radio in the United States to refer to non-religious radio-oriented listener-supported stations, the term has also been used to refer to commercial radio stations that are run independently of the large radio conglomerates.

== See also ==
- Independent Local Radio
- Internet radio
