= MegaNet =

Japanese multicultural FM radio network

The Megalopolis Radio Network (Japanese: メガロポリス・ネットワーク, romanized: Megaroporisu Nettowāku), a.k.a. MegaNet (Japanese: メガネット, romanized: meganetto), is Japan's only network of multi-lingual commercial radio stations. The network was established in December 1999. Currently all such stations are members of the network. The flagship station is InterFM in Tokyo.

They all broadcast in FM. It is the latest network, third national FM network and the fifth in radio in general in Japan.

== Operation ==
As a network of foreign-language focused FM radio stations which serve four major metropolitan areas, MegaNet reaches about 65% of Japan's population. However, unlike the rival network JFL, MegaNet doesn't have an affiliate in Hokkaido. MegaNet lost an affiliate in Aichi Prefecture when Radio-i closed in 2010, reducing its affiliates to three; MegaNet returned to Aichi in April 2014 as InterFM Nagoya and change name as Radio Neo in October 2015; Radio Neo ceased operation in June 2020.

Initially, it was planned that affiliate stations in the network would only share information and produce and broadcast shows independently. However, recently the network has begun to broadcast flagship station InterFM's programming across the entire network.

During the 2002 FIFA World Cup (which Japan co-hosted with South Korea), the network capitalized on the fact that it was targeted towards foreigners by being the only FM network offering live coverage of Japan's games, as well as broadcasting news in English to foreign tourists in the country for the games. (MegaNet is a member of the Japan Consortium). They also broadcast games from the 2006 FIFA World Cup in Germany in conjunction with other radio stations, however FM COCOLO did not participate.

== List of affiliates ==
Broadcasting area(s)		Station		Frequency	Start date of broadcast	Ownership	Note(s)
Prefecture(s)	Region	On air branding	Call sign	Frequency	Start date of broadcast	Ownership	Note(s)
Greater Tokyo Area	Kantō	InterFM	JODW-FM	89.7 MHz	1 April 1996	InterFM Inc. (The Japan FM Network Company)	Flagship station; special affiliate of JFN since 1 September 2020
Kyoto, Osaka, Hyogo and Nara	Kansai	FM Cocolo	JOAW-FM	76.5 MHz	16 October 1995	802 MediaWorks Co., Ltd.	
Fukuoka and Saga	Kyūshū	Love FM	JOFW-FM	76.1 MHz	1 April 1997	Love FM International Broadcasting Co., Ltd.	

=== Former affiliate stations ===
Broadcasting area(s)		Station		Frequency	Years of affiliation	Ownership	Note(s)
Prefecture	Region	On air branding	Call sign	Frequency	Years of affiliation	Ownership	Note(s)
Aichi Prefecture and Hamamatsu City	Chūbu	Radio-i	JOGW-FM	79.5 MHz	2000–2010	Kowa Co. Ltd.	
Aichi Prefecture	Chūbu	Radio NEO	JOCW-FM	79.5 MHz	2014–2020	InterFM Inc. (Kinoshita Management Inc.)	
