= FM Cocolo =

Multilingual FM radio station in Osaka, Japan

JOAW-FM

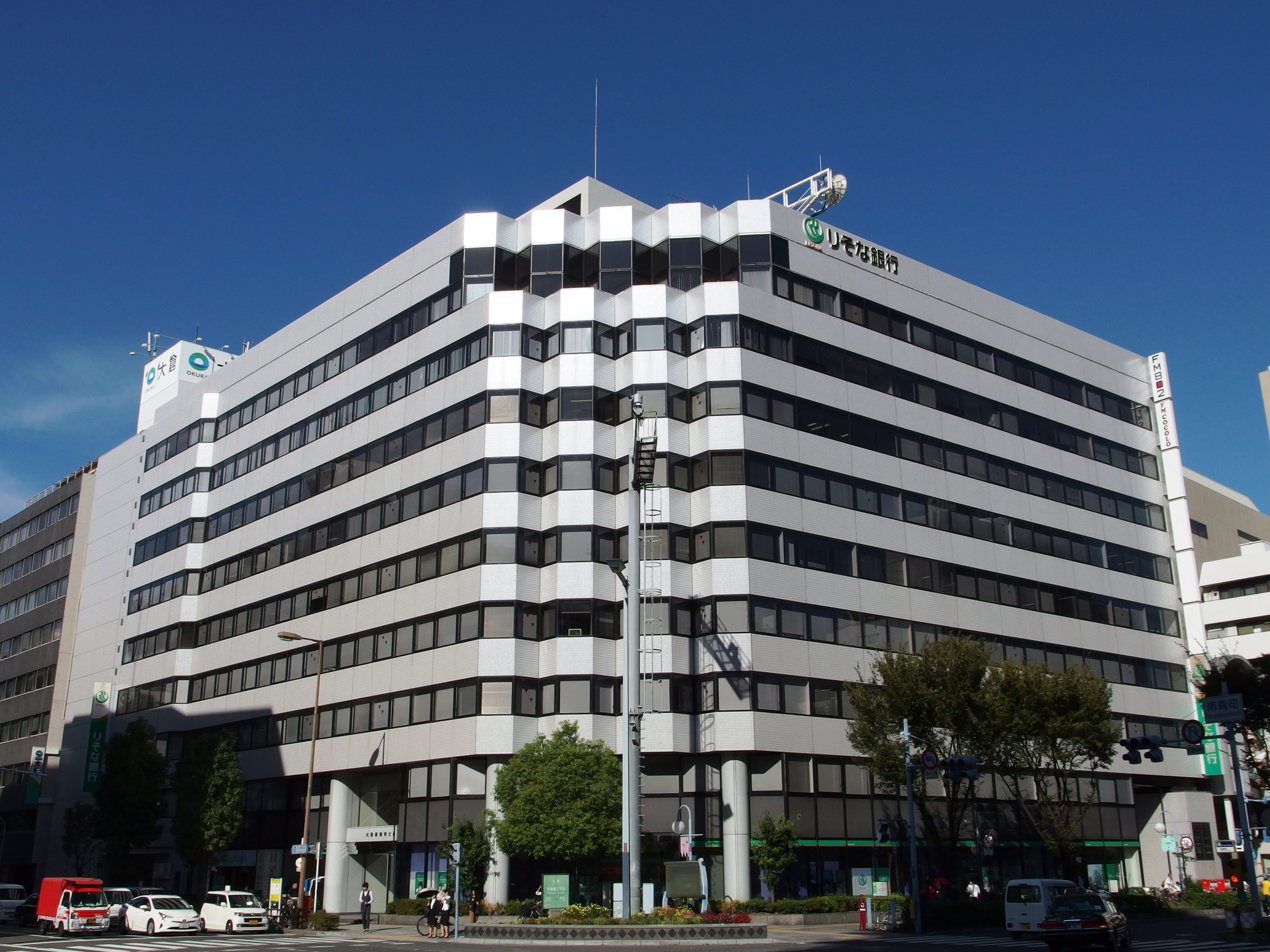
- Osaka, Japan; Japan
- Broadcast area: Kansai region
- Frequency: 76.5 MHz
- Branding: FM Cocolo

Programming
- Format: Variety
- Affiliations: Independent (Since 2020), MegaNet (Between 1999 and 2020)

Ownership
- Owner: FM802 Co., Ltd.
- Sister stations: FM802 (April 1, 2012-Present)

History
- First air date: October 16, 1995; 31 years ago

Links
- Webcast: Webcast
- Website: cocolo.jp

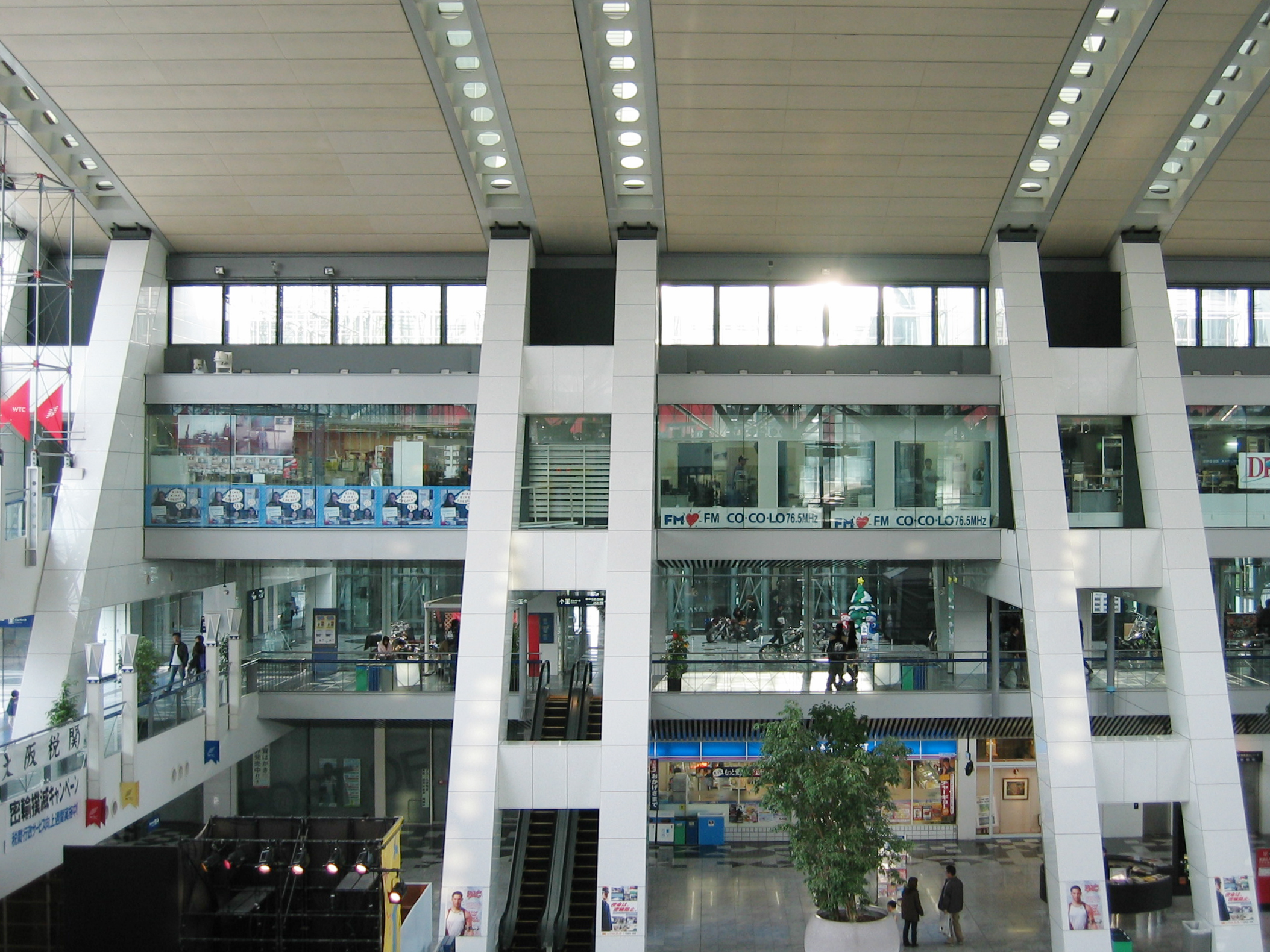
Former studios of FM Cocolo until March 2012 as seen from inside the Osaka Prefectural Government Sakishima Building

FM Cocolo (エフエムココロ, Efu Emu Kokoro), stylized as FM COCOLO, is a multilingual FM radio station owned and operated by FM 802 Co., Ltd. The station broadcasts on the 76.5 MHz FM to the Kansai area which includes Osaka, Kyoto, Hyōgo (city of Kobe), Nara, Shiga, and Wakayama prefectures. FM Cocolo's former owner Kansai Intermedia Co., Ltd. (関西インターメディア株式会社) was based at the Osaka Prefectural Government Sakishima Building (Cosmo Tower) in Suminoe-ku, Osaka, Japan.

FM Cocolo is part of the Megalopolis Radio Network (MegaNet), linking Japan's international FM radio stations (InterFM, FM Cocolo, RADIOi and LoveFM), covering more than 65% of Japan's population.

Most of its programs on FM Cocolo are in English and Japanese, with programs in Chinese, French, Filipino, Hindi, Indonesian, Korean, Malaysian, Portuguese, Sinhalese, Spanish, Thai and Vietnamese air in allocated timeslots, with different music genres played in each hour. Its variety of music contains Top 40, hot adult contemporary, adult contemporary, soft adult contemporary, classic hits, classic rock, and oldies formats. Easy listening music was also presented once an hour during the overnight hours, and some non-categorized music was also presented as well.

== Branding ==
Cocolo (ココロ, Kokoro) is a Japanese term for "heart", and also stands for Cooperation, Communication, Love.

== History ==
FM Cocolo began broadcasting on October 16, 1995.

On April 1, 2012, FM802 Co., Ltd., through its subsidiary 802 MediaWorks, bought Kansai Intermedia, making FM Cocolo its sister station.

== Slogan ==
- "Whole Earth Station"
- "The Heart of the City"
- "Lifetime Music Station"

== Disc Jockeys ==
- Anin (Indonesia)
- Anung (Indonesia)
- Toshihide Baba
- Don Beaver (also a navigator for sister station FM802)
- Mayumi Chiwaki
- Chris
- Cindy (Philippines)
- Eric
- Masayuki Furuya
- Gary
- Setsubai Haku
- Huy (Vietnam)
- Namiko Ikeda
- Shozo Ise
- Yukio Iwata
- Wolfman Jack
- Janne
- Kong Kamasami
- Yukinobu Kami
- Noriyuki Makihara
- Matsuo Khanittha (Thailand)
- Kim, Hee-tae (South Korea)
- Kim, Soo-jung (South Korea)
- Kiyomi
- Mamiko Kotani
- Li, Jia (PR China)
- Maxie (Sri Lanka)
- Meme
- Mina (Philippines)
- Yoshitaka Minami
- Monica
- Mylan (Vietnam)
- Mitsuko Nagao
- Kaname Nemoto
- Karen Okubo
- Masaji Otsuka
- Shin Nishida (also a navigator for sister station FM802)
- Rahman (Malaysia)
- Rogerio (Portugal)
- Roxana (Spain)
- Sandya (Sri Lanka)
- Sirinada (Sri Lanka)
- Sunny (India)
- Masayuki "Mark E" Taniguchi
- Eri Fukamachi
- Daigo Iimuro
- Satoko Nii
- Miki Kato
- Ryudo Uzaki
- Satomi Wakura
- Xiaochen (PR China)

== See also ==
- MegaNet
- InterFM
- Love FM
- Radio neo
- FM802
