= Love FM (Japan) =

Radio station in Fukuoka City, Japan

JOFW-FM
- (Japan) Fukuoka; Japan
- Broadcast area: North Kyushu Island (including parts of Kumamoto, Nagasaki, Saga, Oita, and Yamaguchi)
- Frequency: 76.1 MHz
- Branding: Love FM

Programming
- Languages: Multilingual (English, Japanese, Chinese, Korean and more)
- Format: World ethnic
- Affiliations: Independent (Since 2020), MegaNet (Between 1999 and 2020)

History
- First air date: April 1, 1997
- Call sign meaning: JO Fukuoka's World Ethnic or Free Wave

Technical information
- Power: 100kW
- HAAT: 856 meters
- Translators: 82.5 MHz (Fukuoka West); 82.7 MHz (Kitakyushu)

| owner = LOVE FM International Broadcasting Co., Ltd. | licensee = Tenjin FM, K.K. | sister_stations = JOZZ0AA-FM (community radio) | webcast = | website = www.lovefm.co.jp }} Love FM, stylized LOVE FM, is a commercial radio station based in north Kyushu island, Japan, broadcasting on 76.1 FM from the Fukuoka park side studio to the Kyushu area. Love FM airs mostly music covering a wide range of styles. It is also the third launched international multiple-language radio station in Japan.

First "broadcasting operational company (Hoso Jigyosha)" registered under "broadcasting license (Hoso Jigyo Menkyo)" at launch of the service, was "Kyushu International FM K.K. Kyushu International FM Inc. (株式会社九州国際エフエム, Kabushiki-gaisha Kyu-shu- Kokusai Efu-Emu)", based in Tenjin, Fukuoka-shi, Fukuoka-ken.

Since January 1, 2011, the registrant for this broadcasting operational company has been updated under the name of "Tenjin FM K.K.", which used to run a community FM station called "FREE WAVE".

Programs are broadcast in 10 languages to over 1,000,000 Japanese and 70,000 foreigners on FM wave (along with 140,000,000 Japanese nationwide). The reception areas are Fukuoka/ Saga/ Kumamoto/ Oita/ Nagasaki 76.1 MHz, and Fukuoka nishi 82.5 MHz, a part of Yamaguchi/ Kitakyushu 82.7 MHz.

== History ==
- 1997: On 1 April opens as the third multi-lingual radio station in Japan.
- 1999: On 1 December joins MegaNet.
- 2002: On 11 February Fukuoka Tower transmission begins.

== See also ==
- MegaNet
- InterFM
- FM COCOLO
