= InterFM =

Multicultural radio station in Tokyo

JODW-FM
- Logo used since 2022

- Headquarters in Chiyoda, Tokyo
- Tokyo; Japan
- Broadcast area: Kanto region
- Frequency: 89.7 MHz (Tokyo Tower)
- Branding: InterFM

Programming
- Languages: Japanese (mostly), English (mostly), Mandarin Chinese, Korean, Tagalog, Malay, Indonesian, Spanish, Thai, Portuguese, and French (public service announcements)
- Format: International pop music, information
- Affiliations: JFN (Special station, since 2020), MegaNet (Between 1999 and 2020)

Ownership
- Owner: InterFM Inc.
- Sister stations: Tokyo FM (Since 2020); Radio NEO (Previously, between 2014 and 2020)

History
- First air date: April 1, 1996; 30 years ago
- Former frequencies: 76.1 MHz (April 1996-October 2015)

Technical information
- Licensing authority: MIC
- Power: 10,000 watts (Tokyo); 300 watts (Yokohama)
- ERP: 13,000 watts (Tokyo); 3,700 watts (Yokohama)
- Repeater: 76.5 MHz (Yokohama)

Links
- Website: InterFM

InterFM (JODW-FM 89.7 MHz Tokyo, 76.5 MHz Yokohama) is a Japanese commercial radio station on the FM band, transmitting in the Greater Tokyo area (including Narita International Airport), and owned and operated by InterFM897 Co., Ltd. (株式会社InterFM897). Since September 2020, it is a subsidiary of The Japan FM Network Company, owner of until then rival Tokyo FM. InterFM was formerly the key station of MegaNet.

InterFM started broadcasting from its new frequency of 89.7 MHz on June 26, 2015 with its first official broadcast started on June 30 the same year at 6:00 p.m. InterFM ended broadcasting on its old frequency (76.1 MHz) on October 31, 2015.

== Programming ==
InterFM's slogan is The Real Music Station since April 2013. Its previous slogan was "Tokyo's No. 1 Music Station".

The station uses English as its main language besides Japanese, with the Public Service Announcement segments aired in Mandarin Chinese, Korean, Tagalog, Malay, Indonesian, Spanish, Thai, Portuguese, and French to better serve the international community in the Tokyo Metropolitan area and its vicinity, not to mention news and other information bits in Japanese that the locals will find convenient.

70% of its airtime is dedicated to music created and played worldwide, while the remaining 30% goes to Japanese pop and rock music selected in large part by a committee.

Rebroadcasters of JODW-FM
City of licence	Identifier	Frequency	Power
Yokohama	N/A	76.5 MHz	300 watts

== Shareholders ==
=== Current ===
- The Japan FM Network Company (since September 2020)

=== Past ===
- The Japan Times (past)
- TV Tokyo (past)
- Kinoshita Management Inc. (2016–2020)

== See also ==
- MegaNet
- Japan FM Network
- FM COCOLO
- Love FM
