= Japan FM League =

Japanese commercial radio network

- Type: Commercial radio network
- Country: Japan
- Broadcast area: Nationwide
- Headquarters: Roppongi Hills Mori Tower, Minato, Tokyo, Japan

Ownership
- Owner: J-Wave

History
- Founded: 1 October 1993 (33 years ago)

Coverage
- Availability: Nationwide
- Affiliates: See list

Links
- Website: JFL

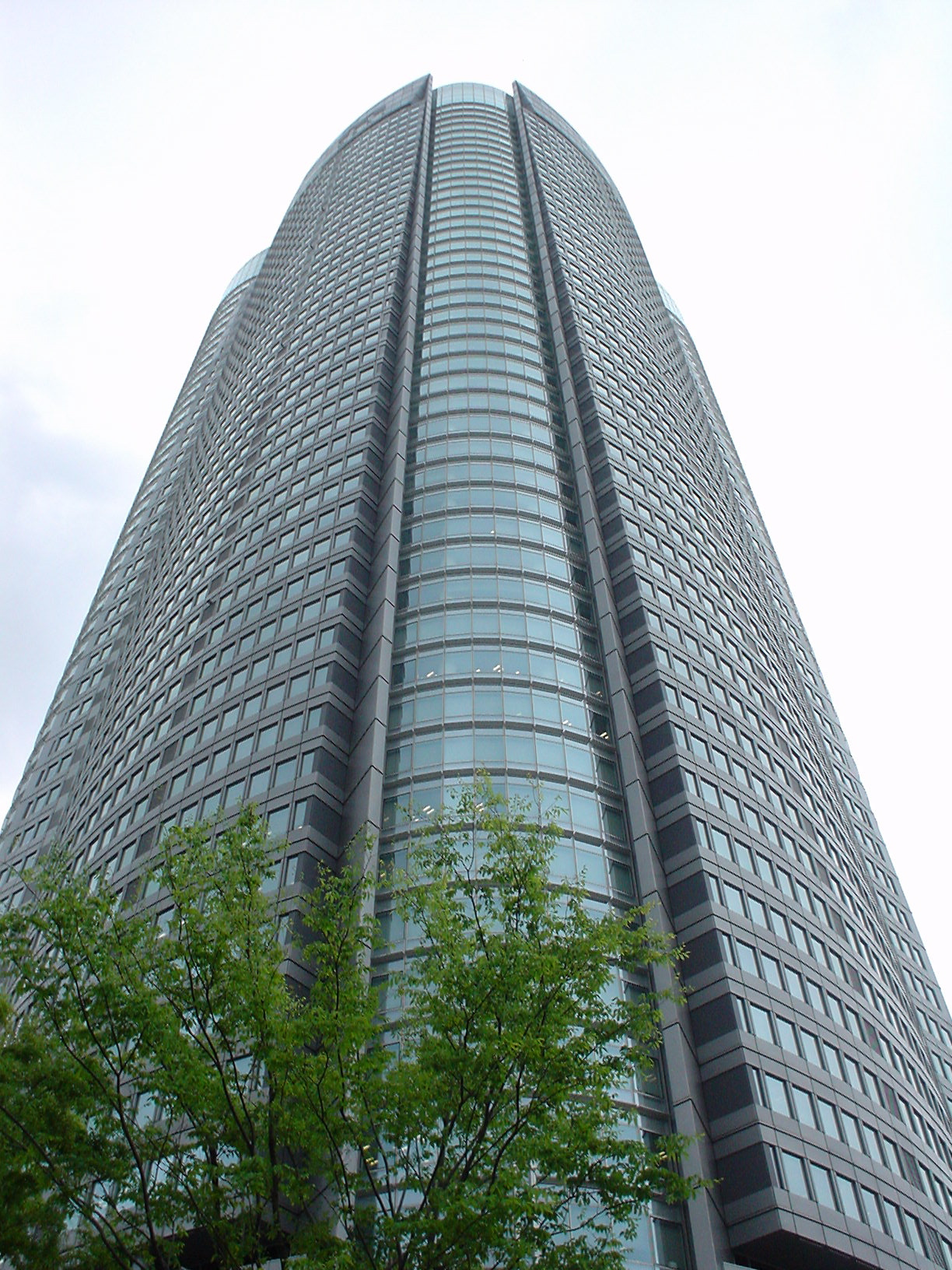
J-Wave headquarters in Minato, Tokyo.

The Japan FM League (JFL; Japanese: ジャパン エフエム リーグ) is a Japanese commercial radio network. It is organised by J-Wave and was established on 1 October 1993.

JFL's main ideal is to respect the operation of each of its affiliates, letting each affiliate flourish under its own terms. The network is a co-operative, with each affiliate offering its resources when useful. So, for example, when J-Wave wants to air a concert or ask for interviews when a group tours in Nagoya, it can easily borrow the studios of Zip FM (the JFL affiliate there) to help produce what's needed.

== List of affiliates ==
Broadcasting area(s)		Station		Frequency	Start date of broadcast	Note(s)
Prefecture(s)	Region	On air branding	Call sign	Frequency	Start date of broadcast	Note(s)
Hokkaidō		FM North Wave	JOPV-FM	82.5 MHz	1 August 1993	
Tokyo	Kantō	J-Wave	JOAV-FM	81.3 MHz	1 October 1988	
Aichi	Chūbu	Zip FM	JOQV-FM	77.8 MHz	1 October 1993	
Osaka	Kansai	FM802	JOFV-FM	80.2 MHz	1 June 1989	
Fukuoka	Kyūshū	Cross FM	JORV-FM	78.7 MHz	1 September 1993	Operated by old management (FM Kyushu Co., Ltd.) until 30 June 2008; took over by new company (Cross FM Co., Ltd.) since 1 July 2008

=== Former affiliate station ===
Broadcasting area(s)		Station		Frequency	Years of affiliation	Note(s)
Prefecture	Region	On air branding	Call sign	Frequency	Years of affiliation	Note(s)
Niigata	Chūbu	FM Port	JOWV-FM	79.0 MHz	2000–2020	Ceased operation on 30 June 2020

== Programmes ==
- Hot 100
