= FM802 =

Radio station in Osaka, Japan

Coordinates: 34°41′52.13″N 135°30′40.78″E

JOFV-FM

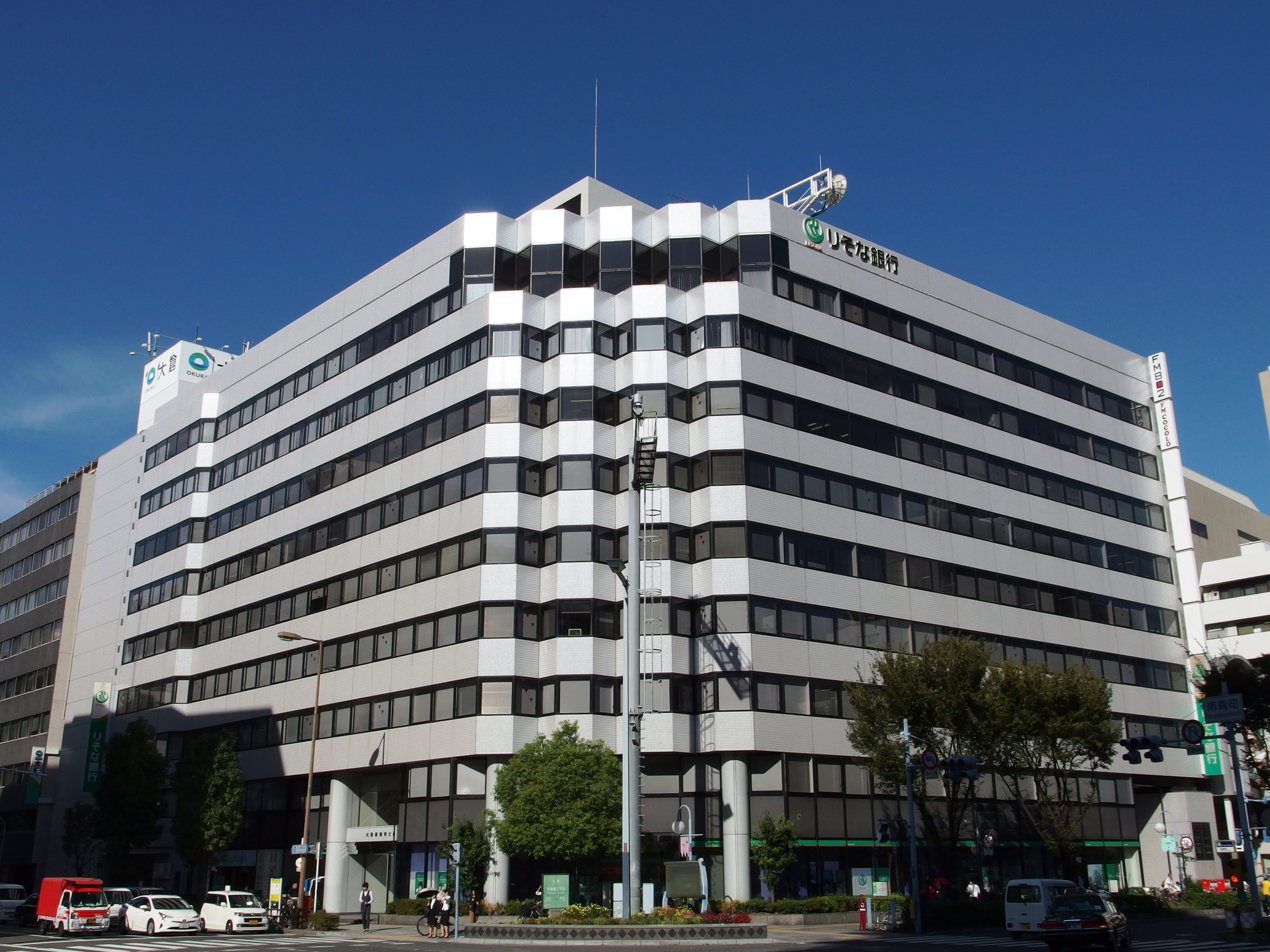
- Osaka; Japan
- Broadcast area: Kansai region
- Frequencies: 80.2 MHz; Nose 78.3 MHz
- Branding: FM802

Programming
- Format: J-pop/CHR/Funk
- Affiliations: Japan FM League

Ownership
- Owner: FM802 Co., Ltd.
- Sister stations: FM Cocolo (April 1, 2012-Present)

History
- First air date: June 1, 1989

Technical information
- Licensing authority: MIC
- ERP: 10,000 watts

Links
- Webcast: http://radiko.jp/#802
- Website: https://funky802.com

FM802 (エフエムはちまるに, Efu Emu Hachi Maru Ni) (call sign JOFV-FM) is a commercial radio station based at Daiwa Minami-morimachi Building in Tenjimbashi Nichome, Kita-ku, Osaka, Japan, broadcasting on 80.2 FM from Mount Iimori to Kansai region. As a latecomer to the radio broadcasting market, it was a focal point for FM802 to differentiate from existing stations. Therefore, rather than featuring music promoted by the productions, they chose to air tunes of their choice in heavy rotation. The station is considered the most popular among the younger generation in Osaka.

FM802 was founded in September 1988, going on air in June the following year, with the call sign of JOFV-FM, as one of the first radio stations to sign on in the Heisei era. The station is a member of the Japan FM League (JFL). It operates 24 hours a day, seven days a week.
