= Nankai Broadcasting =

Radio and television broadcaster in Ehime Prefecture, Japan

Coordinates: 33°50′27″N 132°45′30.5″E

Nankai Broadcasting Company, Ltd.
- Logo used since 2003.

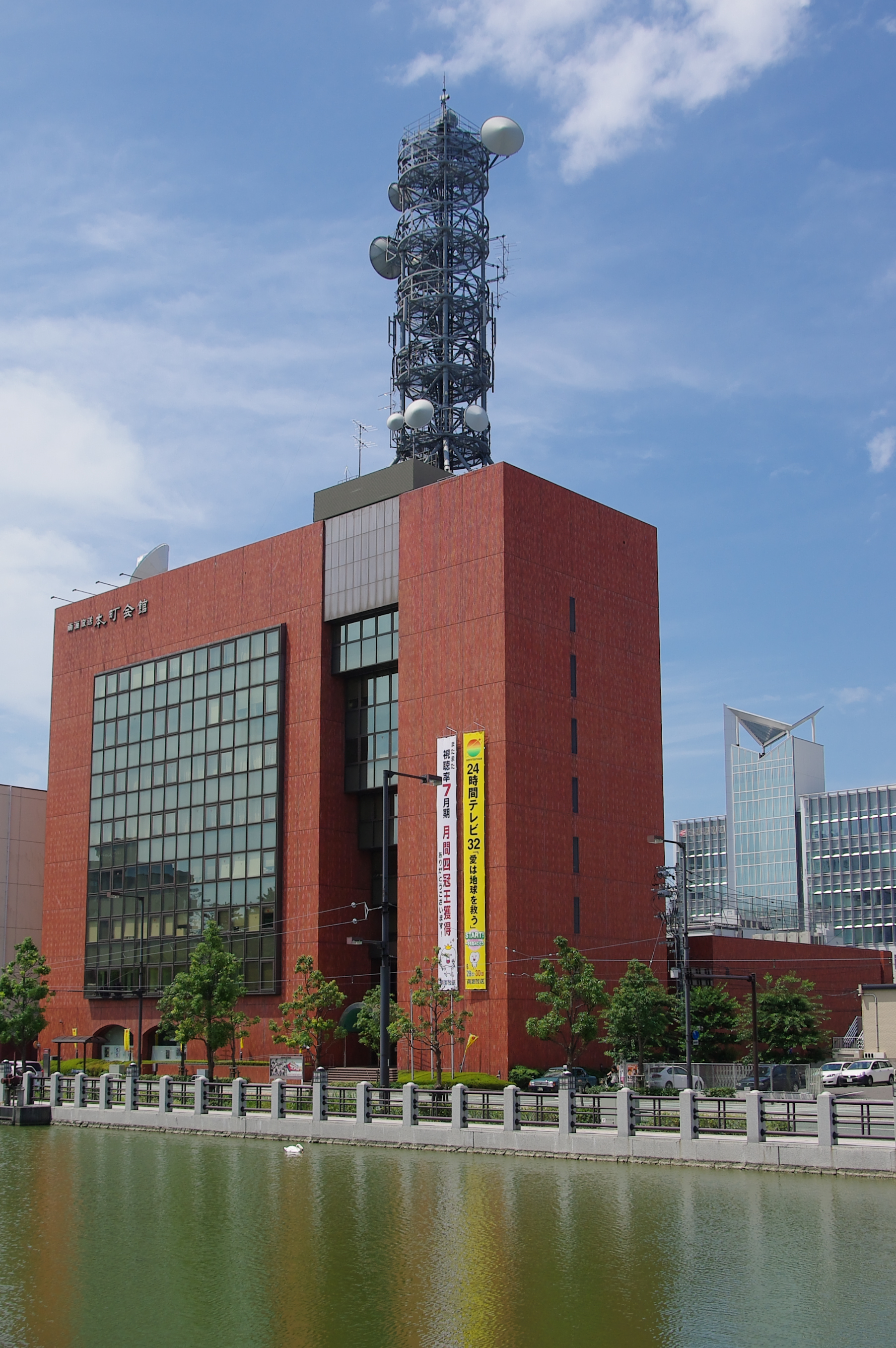
- Headquarters in Matsuyama
- Trade name: RNB
- Native name: 南海放送株式会社
- Romanized name: Nankaihōsō kabushikigaisha
- Type: Private KK
- Industry: Television & Radio broadcasting
- Founded: September 28, 1953; 73 years ago
- Headquarters: 1-1-1 Honmachi, Matsuyama, Ehime Prefecture, Japan
- Key people: Koji Onishi (President and Representative Director)
- Website: www.rnb.co.jp
- Footnotes; Data from its Company Profile

JOAF
- Matsuyama; Japan
- Broadcast area: Ehime Prefecture
- Frequency: 91.7 MHz (FM)
- Branding: FM Nankai Broadcasting

Programming
- Language: Japanese
- Format: Talk, Sports
- Affiliations: JRN/NRN

Ownership
- Owner: Nankai Broadcasting Company, Ltd.

History
- First air date: August 1, 1953
- Former names: Radio Nankai (1953-1964); Nankai Broadcasting Radio (1964-2014); FNam Nankai Broadcasting (2014-2026)
- Former frequencies: 1116 kHz (AM) (until 2026)

Technical information
- Licensing authority: MIC

Links
- Website: www.rnb.co.jp/radio/

JOAF-DTV JOAL-TV (defunct)
- Ehime Prefecture; Japan
- City: Matsuyama
- Channels: Digital: 20 (UHF); Virtual: 4
- Branding: Nankai Broadcasting Television

Programming
- Affiliations: Nippon News Network and Nippon Television Network System

Ownership
- Owner: Nankai Broadcasting Company, Ltd.

History
- First air date: December 1, 1958 (JOAF-TV); December 1, 1961 (JOAL-TV)
- Last air date: July 24, 2011 (JOAL-TV)
- Former call signs: JOAF-TV (1958-2011)
- Former channel numbers: 10 (analog, VHF, 1958-2011); JOAL-TV; 6 (analog, VHF, 1961-2011)

Technical information
- Licensing authority: MIC

Links
- Website: www.rnb.co.jp/tv/

Nankai Broadcasting Company, Ltd (南海放送株式会社, Nankai Hōsō Kabushiki-gaisha), also known as RNB, is a Japanese regional broadcasting company based in Matsuyama, Ehime Prefecture. The broadcaster's radio division JOAF is affiliated with the Japan Radio Network and the National Radio Network while its television division JOAF-DTV (channel 4) is affiliated with the Nippon News Network and the Nippon Television Network System. Both stations serve said prefecture and its studios and headquarters are located in the Honmachi ward of Matsuyama.

The initials come from the radio station's former name, Radio Nankai Broadcasting. The company name Nankai is related to the broadcasting area (as in the former Nankaidō region), and has no relation with the Nankai Electric Railway from Osaka.

== Capital composition ==
Information as of March 31, 2021:

Capital	Total number of shares issued	Number of shareholders
360,000,000 yen	7,200 shares	262

Shareholders	Number of shares held	Proportion
Nankai Broadcasting Employees Stock Ownership Meeting	497 shares	6.90%
Ehime Shimbun	424 shares	5.89%
Meiji Yasuda Life Insurance	380 shares	5.28%
Iyo Bank	359 shares	4.99%
Ehime Bank	359 shares	4.99%
Iyo Railway	346 shares	4.81%
Iyo Total Service	300 shares	4.17%
Iseki	240 shares	3.33%
Ehime prefectural government	200 shares	2.78%
Nippon TV	200 shares	2.78%

== History ==
After the establishment of the "Three Radio Laws" ("Radio Law", "Broadcasting Law", "Radio Wave Supervisory Committee Establishment Law") in 1950, two private radio stations, Chugoku Broadcasting and Shikoku Broadcasting, also appeared in Chugoku and Shikoku. However, Ehime prefecture was initially indifferent to the establishment of a private radio station. It was not until 1952 when the then president of the Ehime Shimbun, Yoichiro Hirata, was inspecting Europe that he urgently ordered the Ehime News Agency to apply for a private radio station license, and Ehime began a movement to apply for the establishment of a private radio station. On August 1, 1953, Radio Nankai (ラジオ南海) obtained a preliminary license and officially started broadcasting at 5:45 a.m. on October 1, becoming the 21st private radio station in Japan. On the same month, Radio Nankai broadcast the 8th National Sports Festival; the first time that a private broadcaster broadcast that event. Within one year of its launch, Radio Nankai achieved profitability. On October 1, 1956, two new relay stations open: one in Niihama (JOAL, 800kc) and one in Uwajima (JOAM, 1560kc).

On November 23, 1955, Radio Nankai applied for a television broadcasting license, and jointly built a television signal transmission tower with NHK. The television division of Radio Nankai decided to join Nippon Television before launch, but it also broadcast some programs from Radio Tokyo TV, Fuji Television, and Nippon Educational Television. At 11 a.m. on December 1, 1958, Radio Nankai began broadcasting its television station (JOAF-TV, channel 10, output 5KW), becoming Japan's 13th private television station. An entertainment event commemorating the 5th anniversary of the opening of the radio station and the opening of the television station was held at the Ehime Prefectural Civic Center (actor Ken Takakura also appeared, performing songs and skits). In order to produce its own programs, the Nankai Radio and Television Division built a studio when it first started broadcasting. It was the first private TV station in Chugoku and Shikoku to have a studio when it started broadcasting. As the television division grew rapidly, Radio Nankai changed its company name to Nankai Broadcasting. In August 1959, the revenue of Nankai Broadcasting's television division exceeded that of the radio division. From December 1961 to May 1962, the income of RNB’s television division was 3.7 times that of the radio division. In 1961, Nankai Broadcasting established television broadcast stations in Niihama (JOAL-TV, channel 6, video output 250W, audio 63W), Yawatahama (channel 4), and Uwajima, and the television signals basically covered the entirety of Ehime Prefecture. On March 30, 1962, the Nankai Broadcasting Union launched a strike, resulting in the broadcast being forced to stop broadcasting for 24 hours.

In 1960, Nankai Broadcasting decided to purchase land behind the road in Matsuyama City for the construction of a broadcasting hall, and issued new shares for this purpose. In March 1964, the Nankai Broadcasting Hall was completed. This building has 4 floors underground and 1 floor above ground, with a total floor area of 4,459 square meters. Radio moved on February 26 and television on February 29. On September 28 of the same year, Nankai Broadcasting began to broadcast color TV programs (networked programming) and opened a new relay station in Ozu (channel 11). On June 1, 1965, it opened its first UHF relay station in Kawanoe (channel 61). Nankai Broadcasting joined the Nippon News Network in 1966, cementing its relationship with NTV. Nankai Broadcasting conducted its first overseas work, also its first local color production, in 1968, interviewing Ehime people who were active throughout Southeast Asia. In 1969, RNB Radio and Television achieved uninterrupted broadcasting throughout the day, ending the daytime break. As of June 1969, when the decision was taken, the station was off air from 4:50pm to 5:20pm. The following year, Nankai Broadcasting implemented all locally-produced programs in color. The first news program in color aired on August 10. Videotape facilities were also converted.

Ehime Broadcasting launched as the Fuji TV/FNN affiliate on December 10, 1969. Most of its primary programming was removed in October as part of a reorganization in anticipation for its launch. On May 12, 1970, Nankai Broadcasting exchanges footage of the Setouchi hijacking incident with NTV/NNN affiliate Hiroshima Telecasting.

In 1976, the Nankai Broadcasting Honmachi Hall was completed and became one of the main cultural facilities in Matsuyama City. In 1972, RNB's television division became an affiliate of the Nippon Television Network System. In 1980, Nankai Broadcasting introduced a complete two-day weekly system. Following the change in the AM frequency plan for stations in ITU regions 2 and 3 to broadcast in fractions of 9KHz, in accordance with the Geneva Frequency Plan of 1975 which went into effect on November 23, 1978, the frequencies of the RNB radio stations were changed thusly: Matsuyama, Imabari and Yawatahama moved to 1116KHz, Niihama to 1557KHz (Which later moved to 1116 kHz after upgrading the Niihama relay to 1kW in 1994). AM stereo broadcasts were experimented publicly on March 15, 1980. It was a first for Japanese local radio, but didn't reach the actual broadcast. Nankai Broadcasting built a new broadcasting hall from 1987 to 1988. The second floor is the news center, which greatly improved Nankai Broadcasting's news program production capabilities. Nankai Broadcasting also introduced the Satellite News Broadcasting (SNG) system in 1989, which greatly improved the mobility of news gathering. Starting in 1988, Nankai Broadcasting broadcast the Ehime Marathon, the first edition broadcast by the station was held on February 21 that year. Audio multiplex broadcasting started on July 19, 1990. During a test broadcast three days before the start of broadcasting, the circuit connections for the main audio and sub audio were switched, causing some programs and commercials to be "silent". This incident was resolved by 6:30pm on the same day.

In the early 1990s, with the collapse of Japan's bubble economy and the launch of the third and fourth private TV stations in Ehime Prefecture, the competition faced by Nankai Broadcasting was significantly intensified than before. From October 1992 to September 1993, Nankai Broadcasting's turnover decreased by 777 million yen compared with the previous year. Nankai Broadcasting also stopped broadcasting programs from TBS and TV Asahi due to the launch of i-Television (EAT, the TV Asahi affiliate, would open in 1995), and stopped broadcasting the Ehime Prefecture qualifiers for the National High School Baseball Championship. When ITV opened, 10 TBS programs moved to the new station. Since 1994, Nankai Broadcasting has won the triple crown of ratings for 9 consecutive years due to the high ratings of flagship NNN/NNS station NTV. On April 1, 1995, a memorandum of understanding was signed with Nippon Television regarding Network Time. With the opening of Ehime Asahi Television, eight TV Asahi programs, excluding those produced by the Private Broadcasting Education Association, were transferred. Its official website opened on November 1, 1996. In 1999, Nankai Broadcasting started 24-hour radio and TV broadcasting, and was the only TV station in Ehime Prefecture to realize 24-hour broadcasting at that time.

Nanhai Broadcasting introduced a new logo in 2003, for its 50th anniversary. On October 1, 2006, Nankai Broadcasting began to broadcast digital TV signals, and stopped broadcasting analog TV signals on July 24, 2011. At the same time that digital TV began to be broadcast, Nankai Broadcasting decided to move its headquarters to Honmachi Kaikan and build an iron tower on the roof of Honmachi Kaikan. On August 1, 2006, Nankai Broadcasting Headquarters moved into Honmachi Kaikan. On December 1, 2014, an FM relay station, Fnam, launches. As of 2017, Nankai Broadcasting has won the triple crown in household viewing ratings for nine consecutive years. In 2022, Nankai Broadcasting also won the triple crown in individual and family ratings, and the personal ratings in 2022 for three years in a row.

The local SVOD platform Nankai On Demand launched on March 13, 2023. The service consists of in-house productions and aims to increase its content to include more original programming, videos and live sports.

=== AM to FM Transition in Ehime ===
The MIC announced in 2021 that 44 out of 47 AM radio stations in Japan will participate in the transition from AM to FM broadcasting to reduce costs in operating AM & FM stations, and improve business performance and efficiency. Nankai Broadcasting, whose Fnam Wide FM service has been serving all of Ehime since 2014, has begun the suspension of AM broadcasting in areas like Niihama and Uwajima from April 1, 2024 to September 30, 2026. On December 1, 2025, the next phase continues with the main radio hub in Matsuyama (which will be gradually reduced in terms of operating power), and the Ozu, and Misano (Ainan) relays will be suspending AM operations. RNB Fnam is currently broadcasting in Matsuyama and Niihama at 91.7MHz, and 91.2MHz in Yawatahama, and other areas. After 72 years of AM broadcasting in the prefecture, Nankai Broadcasting ceased all programming on its 1116kHz frequency all across Ehime on February 10, 2026, urging listeners to switch to the FNam Wide FM service on the 91.7MHz and 91.2MHz frequencies respectively, and also on the internet streaming platform, Radiko.

As of March 2026, 6 broadcasting companies in Japan have transitioned to Wide FM broadcasting suspending, and eventually, shutting down all AM operations, starting with KRY Yamaguchi Broadcasting in 2024, then 2 years later, followed by RAB Aomori Broadcasting in Aomori, Nankai Broadcasting in Ehime, YBS Yamanashi Broadcasting in Yamanashi, FBC Fukui Broadcasting in Fukui, and JRT Shikoku Broadcasting in Tokushima.
