= Yamagata Broadcasting =

Radio and television station in Yamagata Prefecture, Japan

Yamagata Broadcasting Co., Ltd.
- Logo used since 2003

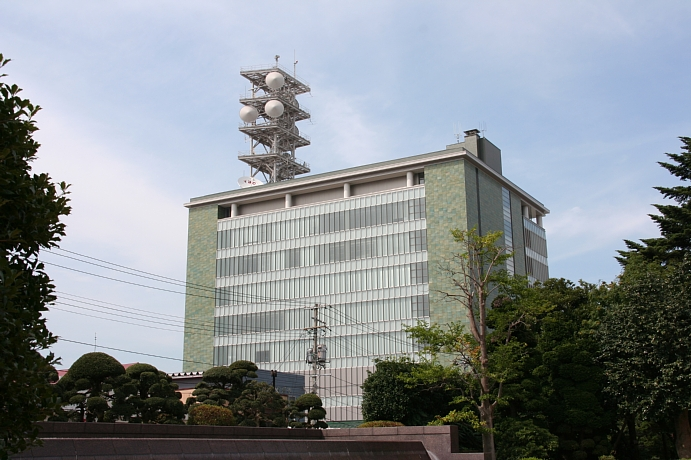
- Headquarters in Tabigomachi, Yamagata
- Trade name: YBC
- Native name: 山形放送株式会社
- Romanized name: Yamagatahōsō kabushiki kaisha
- Type: Kabushiki gaisha
- Industry: Television and radio broadcasting
- Founded: October 1, 1953; 73 years ago
- Headquarters: Yamagata Media Tower, 2-5-12 Tabigomachi, Yamagata City, Yamagata Prefecture, Japan
- Website: www.ybc.co.jp
- Footnotes; Data from its Company Profile

JOEF
- Yamagata; Japan
- Broadcast area: Yamagata Prefecture
- Frequencies: 918 kHz (AM); 92.4 MHz (FM)
- Branding: YBC Radio

Programming
- Language: Japanese
- Format: Talk, Sports
- Affiliations: JRN/NRN

Ownership
- Owner: Yamagata Broadcasting Co., Ltd.

History
- First air date: October 15, 1953; 73 years ago

Technical information
- Licensing authority: MIC

Links
- Website: ybc.co.jp/radio/

JOEF-DTV JOEL-TV (defunct)
- Yamagata Prefecture; Japan
- City: Yamagata
- Channels: Digital: 16 (UHF); Virtual: 4
- Branding: YBC Television

Programming
- Affiliations: Nippon News Network and Nippon Television Network System

Ownership
- Owner: Yamagata Broadcasting Co., Ltd.

History
- First air date: April 1, 1960; 66 years ago (JOEF-TV); October 1, 1961; 65 years ago (JOEL-TV)
- Last air date: July 24, 2011; 15 years ago (JOEL-TV)
- Former call signs: JOEF-TV (1960–2011)
- Former channel numbers: Analog: 10 (Yamagata, VHF, 1960–2011); JOEL-TV: 1 (Tsuruoka, VHF, 1961–2011)
- Former affiliations: NET/ANN (secondary, April 1, 1960 – March 31, 1993)

Technical information
- Licensing authority: MIC

Links
- Website: ybc.co.jp/tv/

Yamagata Broadcasting Co., Ltd. (山形放送株式会社, Yamagatahōsō kabushiki kaisha; YBC) is a Japanese broadcaster in Yamagata. Its radio station is affiliated with Japan Radio Network (JRN) and National Radio Network (NRN), and its television station is affiliated with Nippon News Network (NNN) and Nippon Television Network System (NNS).

== History ==
In the early 1950s, commercial broadcasters began to appear throughout Japan. On February 20, 1953, Yamagata Broadcasting held its first founders' meeting, and Yamagata Shimbun, a local newspaper, had an important role in the establishment of Yamagata Broadcasting, as did most of the first commercial broadcasters in Japan. At that time, the head office of Yamagata Broadcasting was located in Yamagata Shimbun with a capital of 50 million yen.

On March 14 of the same year, Yamagata Broadcasting applied to the Ministry of Post and Telecommunications for a broadcasting license, and obtained a preliminary license on August 14 of the same year. However, Yamagata Broadcasting was facing a shortage of funds at that time, so the president of Yamagata Shimbun, Hattori Keio, requested the Yamagata Prefectural Government to fund Yamagata Broadcasting, and finally got the agreement. On September 26, 1953, Yamagata Radio began to transmit experimental radio signals. On October 5 of the same year, Yamagata Broadcasting received a formal broadcast license. The next day, Yamagata Broadcasting started trial broadcast.

At 12:00 on October 15, 1953, Yamagata Broadcasting officially started broadcasting. On December 24 of the same year, Yamagata Broadcasting extended its broadcast time to 6am to 11pm. At the end of the same year, Yamagata Broadcasting increased its capital by 30 million yen. On October 15, 1954, the first anniversary of its launch, Yamagata Broadcasting opened the Tsuruoka broadcasting station (JOEL), covering the Shonai area. On November 10 of the same year, Yamagata Broadcasting and Nippon Broadcasting System signed a program cooperation agreement. According to the results of the first listening rate survey in November 1955, Yamagata Broadcasting's listening rate reached 47.9%, surpassing NHK Radio 1 of 45.4%. In the second survey in August of the following year, this number changed to 56.3% vs. 37%, and Yamagata Broadcasting's advantage further expanded. In fiscal year 1955, Yamagata Broadcasting achieved profitability for the first time. After six capital increases, Yamagata Broadcasting's capital increased to 164 million yen in the autumn of 1957.

Yamagata Broadcasting established the "Yamagata Broadcasting Television Establishment Preparatory Committee" on January 8, 1957 to prepare for the establishment of a television station. On October 22, 1957, Yamagata Broadcasting obtained a television preliminary broadcast license. At the same time, in order to cope with the increase in equipment and manpower required for the launch of television, Yamagata Broadcasting began to jointly plan to build a new headquarters with Yamagata Shimbun. On July 29, 1959, construction began on the Yamagata Shimbun Broadcasting Hall, a new joint headquarters building for both companies. This building has six floors and has a 53-meter-high TV tower on the roof. It cost 550 million yen. The Yamagata Shimbun Broadcasting Hall was officially completed on October 7, 1960.

In terms of TV network selection, Yamagata Broadcasting chose to join the Nippon Television network. On March 16, 1960, Yamagata Broadcasting received an official television broadcast license. On March 21, Yamagata Broadcasting began transmitting experimental television signals. On the 25th of the same month, Yamagata Broadcasting began to pilot the TV program. In March 1960, just before Yamagata Broadcasting started television broadcasting, there were only 13,467 television sets in Yamagata Prefecture, with a penetration rate of only 5.6%. Therefore, Yamagata Broadcasting actively promoted the popularization of televisions before the launch of television, and carried out activities such as "TV Savings".

On April 1, 1960, Yamagata Broadcasting Station officially launched. At the beginning of the broadcast, Yamagata Broadcasting broadcast programs from 10:00 to 13:00 and 17:30 to 22:30 every day, with a daily broadcast time of 8 hours. On October 1, 1966, Yamagata Broadcasting began broadcasting color television programs. According to a ratings survey in September 1968, among the 20 TV programs with the highest ratings in Yamagata Prefecture, 19 were from Yamagata Broadcasting and only 1 was from NHK. On June 16, 1975, a groundbreaking ceremony was held for the Yamagata News Broadcasting Hall, and the Yamagata Broadcasting Headquarters was expanded again. On October 1 of the following year, the Yamagata Shimbun Broadcasting Hall was completed. In fiscal year 1978, Yamagata Broadcasting's turnover reached 4.53 billion yen and net profit reached 345 million yen.

On April 1, 1980, Yamagata Broadcasting joined the TV Asahi network ANN and became affiliated to two networks simultaneously.

Yamagata Broadcasting started broadcasting stereo TV programs in August 1981 and was the first commercial TV station in Yamagata Prefecture to broadcast stereo programs. In 1982, Yamagata Broadcasting sent reporters to Poland to collect information and successfully reported the exclusive news that the Polish government recognized that it would lift martial law. According to a ratings survey conducted by Video Research in December 1983, Yamagata Broadcasting won the triple crown of ratings in Yamagata Prefecture with 15% for the whole day, 29.3% for the prime time, and 28.7% for the evening period. To commemorate the 30th anniversary of the founding, Yamagata Broadcasting and Yamagata Shimbun jointly published "Yamagata Prefecture Encyclopedia" in 1981.

In 1993, when Yamagata Television System switched to ANN, the secondary affiliation agreement with TV Asahi was relinquished and the station became a full-time NTV affiliate.
