= Radio Okinawa =

Radio station in Okinawa Prefecture, Japan

JOXR
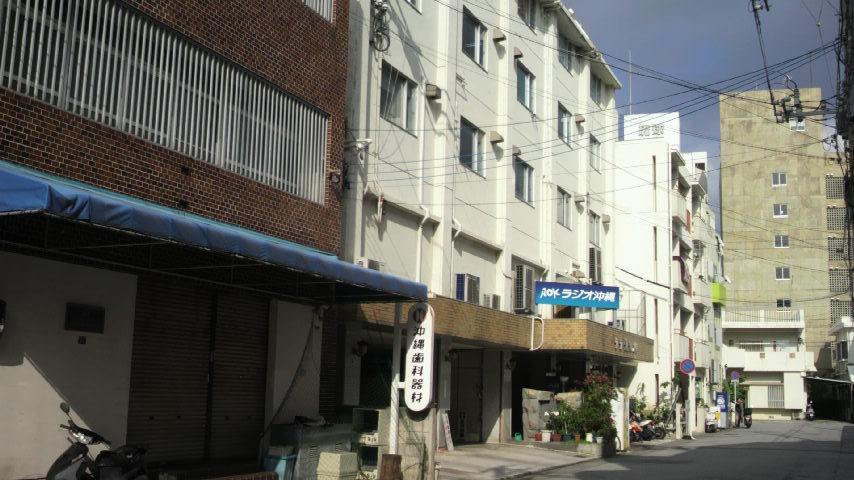
- Headquarters in Nishi, Naha

Naha, Okinawa; Japan
- Broadcast area: Okinawa Prefecture
- Frequencies: 864 KHz (AM); 93.1 MHz (FM)
- Branding: Radio Okinawa; ROK

Programming
- Language: Japanese
- Format: Full Service
- Affiliations: National Radio Network

Ownership
- Owner: Radio Okinawa Co., Ltd.

History
- First air date: July 1, 1960; 65 years ago
- Former call signs: KSDT (1960-1972)
- Former frequencies: 1370 (1960-1962); 780 (1962-1978); 783 (1978-1998)

Technical information
- Licensing authority: MIC
- Power: 10 kilowatts

Links
- Website: https://www.rokinawa.co.jp

Radio Okinawa (ラジオ沖縄) is an AM radio station in Okinawa, Japan. The station is an affiliate of the National Radio Network (NRN). It started broadcasting on July 1, 1960.

== History ==
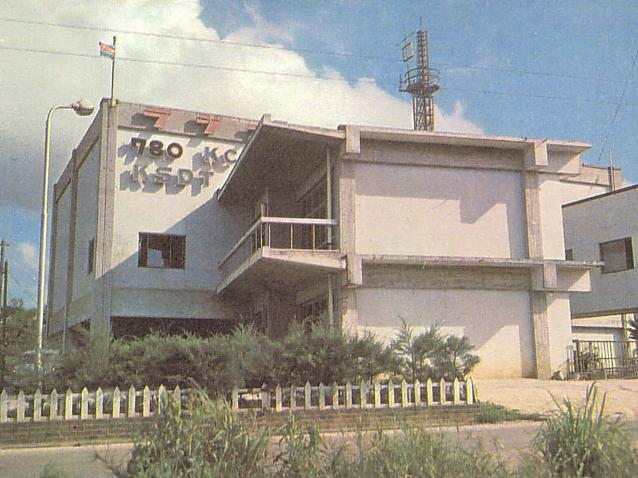
Radio Okinawa's building in the 1960s

The station opened on July 1, 1960 as KSDT, broadcasting on 1370kc; at the same time, it joined the Japan Commercial Broadcasters Association together with RBC and OTV as associate members before the reversion of Okinawa to Japan. On May 20, 1961, for the fortieth anniversary of the incorporation of Naha as a city, it aired the first professional baseball game held in Okinawa, between Nishitetsu Lions and Toei Flyers, and was broadcast nationwide on Nippon Broadcasting System. The frequency changed to 780kc on April 22, 1962, and again on November 23, 1978 to 783kHz, in compliance with the new frequency plan.

On April 27, 1997, Radio Okinawa started nationwide broadcasting via PerfecTV! (later renamed SKY PerfecTV!) channel 506 under the name Haisai! Radio 506 (はいさい!ラジオ506) at a monthly subscription of 200 yen. The channel rebroadcast much of Radio Okinawa's programming, including commercials, excluding nationwide NRN programming due to rights issues. > The channel ceased broadcasting on September 30, 2001.

On August 1, 1998, the station moved to 864kHz. On October 2, 2017, the station started nationwide carriage again, this time on Radiko Premium, marking the first time since 2001 that the station was available outside Okinawa. The station changed its logo on March 30, 2020, in line with the 60th anniversary of the station.
