= 558 AM =

AM radio frequency

The following radio stations broadcast on AM frequency 558 kHz:

== Australia ==
- VL4AM at Atherton, Queensland
- VL4GY at Gympie, Queensland
- VL6WA at Wagin, Western Australia

== Iran ==
- Radio Iran in Tehran

== Japan ==
- Radio Kansai in Kobe, Hyogo

== Philippines ==
Call sign	City of license	Power (kW)
DZXL	Makati City	40

== South Korea ==
KBS Radio 2 Daegu(HLSA, D250kW)

== United Kingdom ==
- Panjab Radio in London & South East England
