= Aomori Broadcasting Corporation =

Television and Radio station in Aomori Prefecture, Japan

- Logo used since 1968

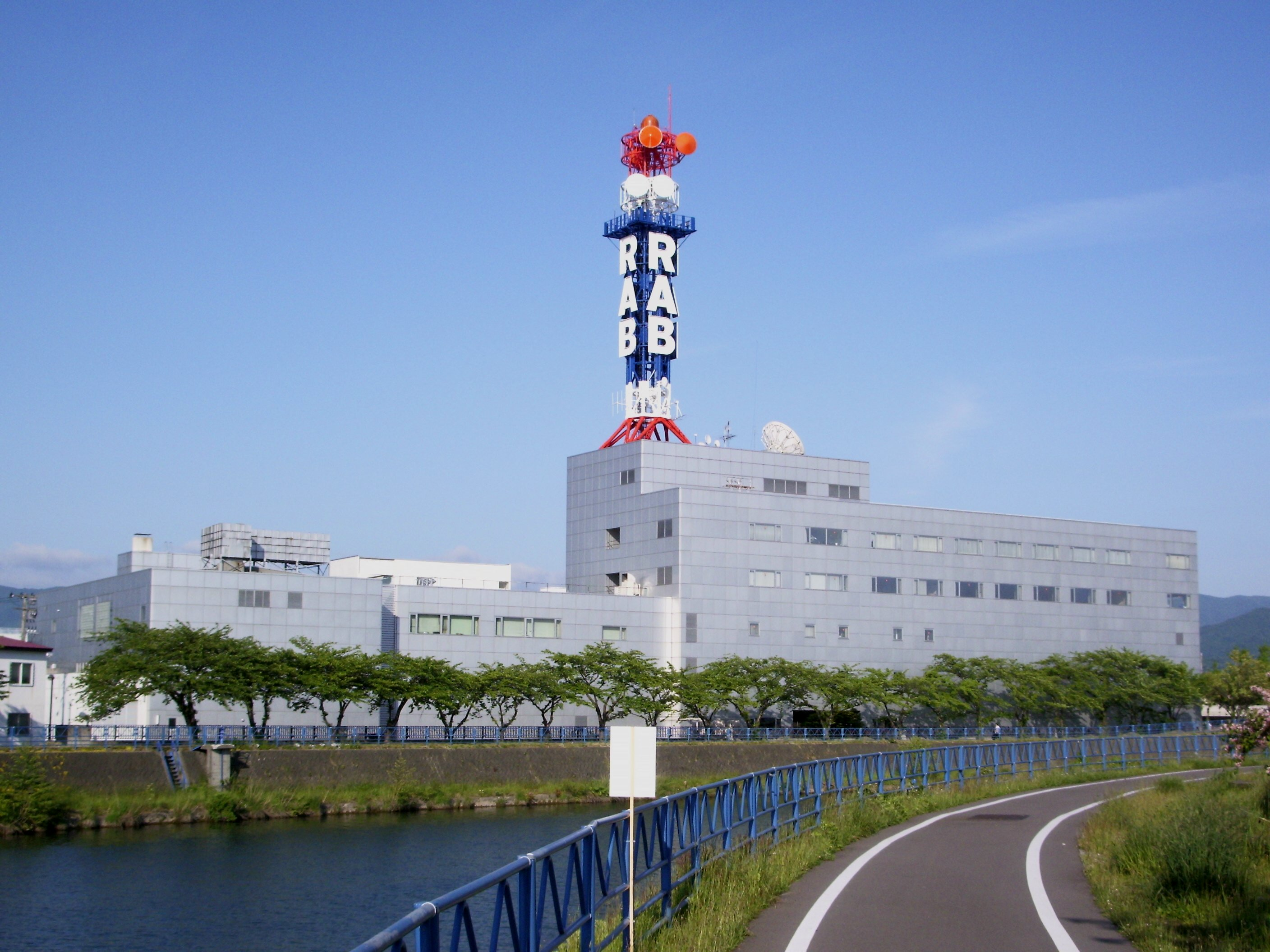
- Headquarters in Matsumori, Aomori
- Native name: 青森放送株式会社
- Romanized name: Aomori Hōsō Kabushiki Gaisha
- Formerly: Radio Aomori Co., Ltd. (1953–1961)
- Type: Private
- Founded: September 30, 1953; 73 years ago
- Headquarters: 1-8-1 Matsumori, Aomori City, Aomori Prefecture
- Key people: Kenta Yamamoto (President and CEO)
- Number of employees: 130 (as of April 1, 2021)
- Website: www.rab.co.jp
- Footnotes; Data from its Company Profile

JOGR
- Aomori; Japan
- Broadcast area: Aomori Prefecture
- Frequencies: 1233 kHz; 91.7 MHz FM
- Branding: RAB Radio

Programming
- Language: Japanese
- Format: Talk/Sports
- Affiliations: JRN/NRN

Ownership
- Owner: Aomori Broadcasting Corporation

History
- First air date: October 12, 1953; 73 years ago

Technical information
- Licensing authority: MIC

Links
- Website: rab.co.jp/radio/

JOGR-DTV
- Aomori Prefecture; Japan
- City: Aomori
- Channels: Digital: 28 (UHF); Virtual: 1
- Branding: RAB Television

Programming
- Language: Japanese
- Affiliations: Nippon News Network and Nippon Television Network System

Ownership
- Owner: Aomori Broadcasting Corporation

History
- First air date: October 1, 1959; 67 years ago
- Former call signs: JOGR-TV (1959-2011)
- Former channel numbers: Analog: 1 (VHF, 1959-2011)
- Former affiliations: All-Nippon News Network (April 1, 1975–September 30, 1991)

Technical information
- Licensing authority: MIC

Links
- Website: rab.co.jp/tv/

Aomori Broadcasting Corporation (青森放送株式会社, Aomori Hōsō Kabushiki Gaisha; RAB) is a television and radio broadcaster in Aomori, Japan. It is affiliated with Japan Radio Network (JRN), National Radio Network (NRN), Nippon News Network (NNN) and Nippon Television Network System (NNS).

As the prefecture doesn't have an FNN/FNS affiliate, RAB alongside ATV & ABA air certain Fuji TV programming.

== History ==
=== Launch as radio broadcaster ===
There were initial attempts to establish a commercial broadcaster in the prefecture in December 1947, which was then supported with the passage of the "Three Radio Laws" (Radio Law, Broadcasting Law, and Radio Supervisory Committee Establishment Law) in 1950.

At that time, there were competition for private broadcasting license between Radio Tohoku (not related to the former name of Akita Broadcasting), an unnamed local newspaper in Aomori, and Tohoku Broadcasting. In April 1953, Tohoku Radio and Tohoku Broadcasting made a settlement, and Tohoku Broadcasting cancelled its application for a broadcasting license in Aomori Prefecture, and the two cooperated fully. In August of the same year, Radio Tohoku received its broadcasting license which was then renamed to Radio Aomori on September 26.

Radio Aomori was then established on September 30, 1953. A day before its establishment, they conducted trial radio broadcasts. On October 12, 1953, Radio Aomori officially started broadcasting. Upon its launch, Radio Aomori wasn't receivable to southern parts of the prefecture. This was later resolved when the Hirosaki relay transmitter was opened in 1956. According to a survey conducted by the local government of Aomori Prefecture in 1957, Radio Aomori accounted for 76.2% in audience share compared to NHK Radio 1's 21%.

=== Expansion to TV broadcasting and further developments on radio ===
Radio Aomori started preparing to broadcast on TV since August 1955, and obtained a TV broadcast license in October 1957. They conducted trial broadcasts on September 14, 1959, and officially started TV broadcasting on October 1 of the same year. RAB initially intended to join Japan News Network. However, before it started broadcasting it was discovered that Nippon Television were the most favorable. In October 1961 to reflect the rapid development of their television broadcasting, Aomori Radio changed its name to Aomori Broadcasting. In 1965, RAB joined the Japan Radio Network and National Radio Network networks at the same time, avoiding costs of having another AM radio station in the prefecture.

RAB started color TV broadcasting in 1966 and expanded to uninterrupted sign-on to sign-off broadcasts in May 1970. On April 1, 1975, RAB started airing TV Asahi programming as it joined the All-Nippon News Network after Aomori Television withdrew from being an ANN affiliate. RAB then withdrew from airing ANN programming when Asahi Broadcasting Aomori opened on October 1, 1991, and continued to air Fuji TV programming.

In 1991, RAB won 7 awards in the 1991 Japan Commercial Broadcasters Association Award. Since Video Research started conducting rating surveys in Aomori on 1989, RAB continued to be number 1 in terms of TV rating. On July 13, 1995, it started broadcasting in Wide Clear Vision (EDTV).

On January 18, 2026, it began a four-week plan to shut down its AM radio broadcasts.
