= Radio Osaka =

JOUF
- Logo used since 2025

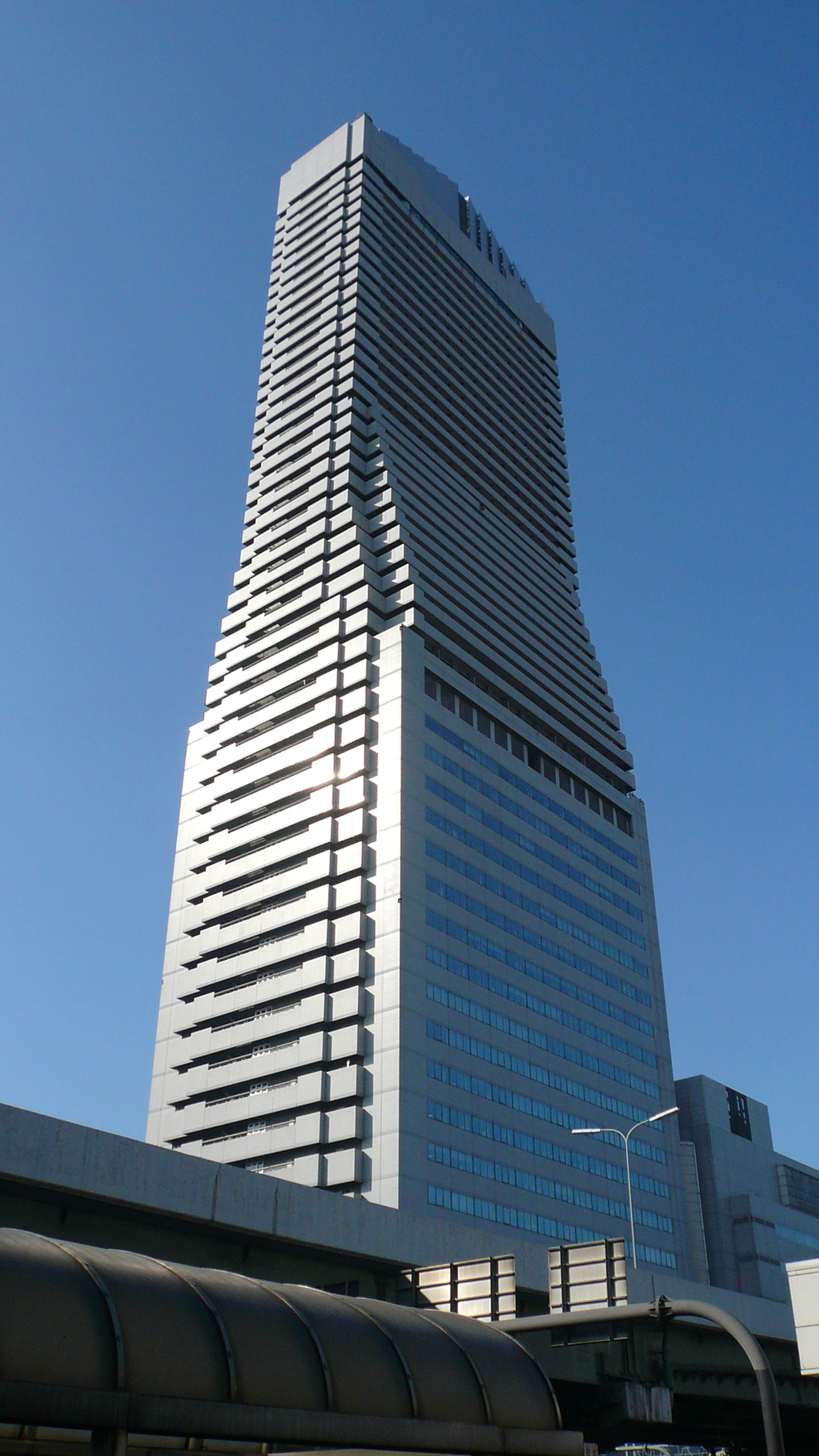
- Headquarters in Minato-ku, Osaka
- Osaka; Japan
- Broadcast area: Kansai region
- Frequencies: 1314 kHz (AM); 91.9 MHz (FM)
- Branding: OBC; Radio Osaka

Programming
- Language: Japanese
- Format: Talk, Sports
- Affiliations: National Radio Network

Ownership
- Owner: Radio Osaka Corporation

History
- First air date: 1 July 1958; 68 years ago

Technical information
- Licensing authority: MIC
- Power: 50,000 watts

Links
- Webcast: http://radiko.jp/#OBC
- Website: https://www.obc1314.co.jp

Radio Osaka Corporation (株式会社ラジオ大阪, Kabushiki-gaisha Rajio Osaka; OBC) is an AM radio station of National Radio Network (NRN) in Osaka, Japan. It is a company of the Donuts group, which owns 34% of the shares in the company with the Sankei Shimbun, part of the Fujisankei Communications Group owning 15.9% of the broadcaster's shares.

Radio Osaka started broadcasting on July 1, 1958.

Despite not being a member of the TBS Radio-led Japan Radio Network, OBC Radio Osaka is the only NRN-affiliated key station to air some of its programs, most notably, the weekday morning program, BRAND NEW MORNING.
