= Radio Kansai =

Radio station in Hyogo Prefecture, Japan

Radio Kansai (Japanese: ラジオ関西, Hepburn: Rajio Kansai; CRK) is a commercial radio station in Hyogo Prefecture. Launched in 1951, it was the tenth commercial radio station to be set up overall in Japan, and one of three not affiliated to any of the two commercial AM networks.

Despite being a former affiliate of the National Radio Network, Radio Kansai still airs some NRN programming, including the popular late-night flagship "All Night Nippon", and also airs some programs from the Japan Radio Network as an effort to boost program sales.

== History ==
Kobe Broadcasting was set up on August 22, 1951 and received its license to operate on March 20, 1952, callsign JOCR operating on a frequency of 1490KC and an output of 1W. It started broadcasting on April 1, 1952.

Considering that the area of reception was smaller than expected, Radio Kobe moved to AM frequency 560 and increased its output to 3W on August 1, 1953. The name changed to the current Radio Kansai on January 1, 1960. On November 1, 1971, it upgraded its output to 20kW.

The station was an affiliate of the National Radio Network from 1965 to 1978. That year, after becoming an independent station again, it moved to 558kHz due to the passing of the new Geneva Frequency Plan.

CRK started conducting Wide FM simulcasts on both the Kobe and Himeji transmitters on December 14, 2018. Regular Wide FM broadcasts started on April 1, 2019.

== Broadcast ==
The main transmitter in Kobe is JOCR, broadcasting on 558kHz, with relay station JOCE, 1395kHz, in Toyooka. The station delivers its FM signal from both Kobe and Himeji on 91.1 FM with the Kobe transmitter operating on 1kW and the Himeji relay at 100W. The station's transmitter is located close to Japan's timezone meridian.

The FM signals started on April 1, 2019. A synchronized FM broadcasting system was developed by Nitsuki and Yamaguchi Broadcasting was introduced, with the aim of delivering the signals over the same frequency in Kobe and Himeji.
