= Nippon Cultural Broadcasting =

Radio station in Tokyo, Japan

Coordinates: 35.656912°N 139.757162°E

JOQR
- Logo used since 2015

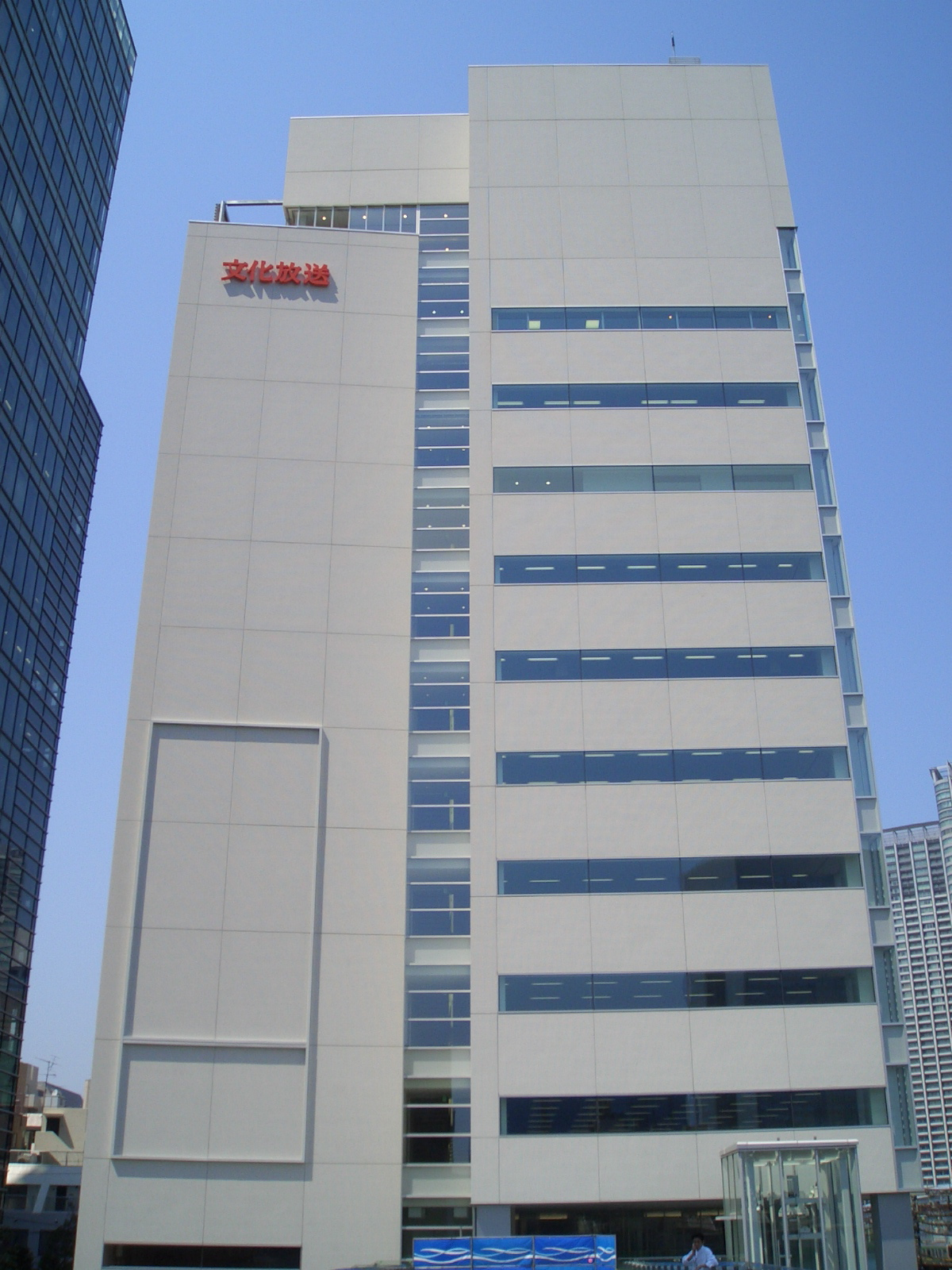
- Headquarters in Minato, Tokyo
- Tokyo; Japan
- Broadcast area: Kanto region
- Frequencies: 1134 kHz (AM); 91.6 MHz (FM)
- Branding: Bunka Hōsō AM 1134 (文化放送 AM 1134, Bunka Hōsō AM ichi ichi san yon; "Nippon Cultural Broadcasting AM 1134 kHz")

Programming
- Language: Japanese
- Format: Talk, Sports, Religious
- Affiliations: National Radio Network

Ownership
- Owner: Nippon Cultural Broadcasting Inc.

History
- First air date: March 31, 1952; 74 years ago

Technical information
- Licensing authority: MIC
- Power: 100,000 watts (AM 1134 kHz); 7,000 watts (FM 91.6 MHz)
- ERP: 57,000 watts (FM 91.6 MHz)

Links
- Website: www.joqr.co.jp

Corporate information
- Company
- Native name: 株式会社文化放送
- Romanized name: Kabushiki-gaisha Būnka Hōso
- Type: Private
- Founded: February 13, 1956
- Headquarters: Hamamatsuchō, Minato, Tokyo, Japan
- Key people: Kyoto Saito (president and CEO)
- Owner: Society of St. Paul (30.0%); Shogakukan (17.1%); Kodansha (9.0%); Dai Nippon Printing (8.5%); Kobunsha; Toei Company; Ie no Hikari
- Subsidiaries: Bunkahoso Kaihatsu Center; Japan Central Music; Bunkahoso Career Partners; Bunkahoso iCraft; Nippon Cultural Broadcasting Extend; Nippon Cultural Broadcasting Media Bridge

Nippon Cultural Broadcasting Inc. (株式会社文化放送, Kabushiki-gaisha Bunka Hōsō; JOQR, QR or simply Cultural Broadcasting) is a Japanese radio station in Tokyo which broadcasts to the Kanto area. It is one of the two flagship radio stations of National Radio Network (NRN) (the other station is Nippon Broadcasting System, Inc. (株式会社ニッポン放送)) and is a member of the Fujisankei Communications Group.

== History ==
The station was established in 1951 by the Society of St. Paul to promote Catholic religion on the Japanese culture. JOQR went on the air on March 31, 1952 as the Japan Cultural Broadcasting Association. The station initially broadcast on 1310kc (10 kW output) but moved to 1130kc (former frequency of TBS Radio) on August 15, 1953 in order for the Nippon Broadcasting System to use JOQR's former frequency.

At the time of its opening, the mission was to "improve Japanese culture, spread the ideals of truth, goodness, justice, and a sound democratic ideology based on humanity, and contribute to the rise of the nation and the prosperity of the people". However, due to self-righteous management by Priest Paolo Marcelino of the Sisters of St. Paul, who was in charge, and the hiring of a large number of employees who had been red-purged from NHK at the time of its opening, labor disputes occurred frequently, and religious overtones occurred. The company's business conditions deteriorated and its representatives changed frequently due to concerns from those around it, low audience ratings due to a lack of entertainment programs, a narrow broadcasting area due to low output, and a lack of emphasis on profit. There were also rumors that the content of the broadcast was biased to the extent that it was said to be "a broadcast aimed at communist Japan", and that it was "taken over by the left-leaning and anti-American Japan Labor Union General Council (Sohyo)".

The business world, feeling a sense of crisis, decided to take countermeasures in cooperation with publishers such as Obunsha and Kodansha, as well as companies from all over the world, and as a result, the Society of St. Paul and the Society of St. Paul Girls' School were forced to withdraw from the management of the station. As a result, the Japan Cultural Broadcasting Corporation was formally dissolved on February 16, 1956. However, since the Sisters of St. Paul had invested in equipment such as the company building and transmitting station at the time, they were given matching shares, and are now the largest shareholder of the Nippon Cultural Broadcasting Co., Ltd., and have sent one director to the company.

In 1957, Cultural Broadcasting established Fuji Television as part of a joint venture with Nippon Broadcasting System. Cultural Broadcasting was one of the founding companies behind the creation of the Fujisankei Communications Group in 1967. To this day, Cultural Broadcasting remains associated with the Fujisankei Communications Group and has a 3.30% ownership in Fuji Media Holdings, the company it helped established with Nippon Broadcasting System in 1957 as Fuji Television.

JOQR moved the head office from Wakaba, Shinjuku to QR Media Plus in Hamamatsuchō, Minato on July 24, 2006, and started broadcasting from Hamamatsuchō at 13:00 on the same day.

Society of St. Paul holds 30 percent of the station's shares, followed by Shogakukan (17.1%), Kodansha (9.0%) and Dai Nippon Printing (8.5%).

As for future plans, in order to eliminate the burden of equipment renewal costs due to slumping advertising revenue and double investment with Wide FM, JOQR will work with 43 commercial broadcasters that provide AM broadcasting nationwide, excluding Hokkaido and Akita, to shift to FM broadcasting, announced on June 15, 2021. Subsequently, in a press release issued on June 24 of the same year, Nippon Cultural Broadcasting stated that it would not participate in the demonstration experiment to be conducted from 2024 regarding AM suspension, and that it would not be able to continue AM broadcasting at the time of license renewal in the fall of 2028. The plan is to decide whether to continue as usual or quit (switch to FM broadcasting).

On July 13, 2026, Nippon Culture Broadcasting ceased operations of the Emergency Warning Broadcast System.

== Headquarters ==
It is headquartered at QR Media Plus - 31, Hamamatsuchō 1-chōme, Minato, Tokyo, Japan.
