= National Radio Network (Japan) =

Japanese radio network

- Current logo of the National Radio Network of Japan
- Type: Commercial radio network
- Country: Japan
- Broadcast area: Nationwide
- Headquarters: Nippon Cultural Broadcasting, Hamamatsuchō, Minato, Tokyo, Japan; Nippon Broadcasting System, 9-3, Yūrakuchō, Chiyoda, Tokyo, Japan

Ownership
- Owner: Fujisankei Communications Group

History
- Founded: 3 May 1965 (61 years ago)

Coverage
- Availability: Nationwide
- Affiliates: See list

Links
- Website: JOQR; JOLF

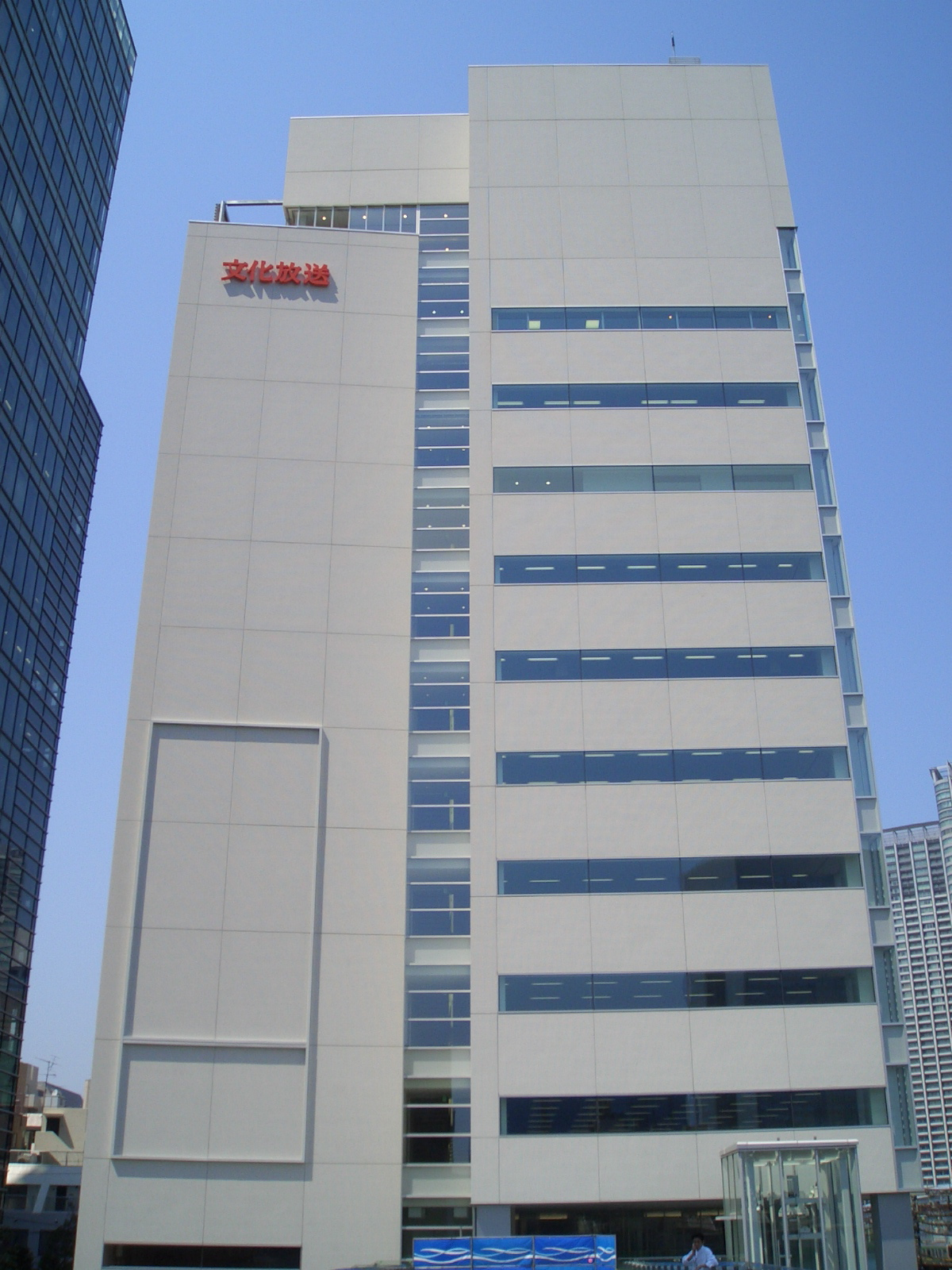
Nippon Cultural Broadcasting headquarters in Minato, Tokyo.

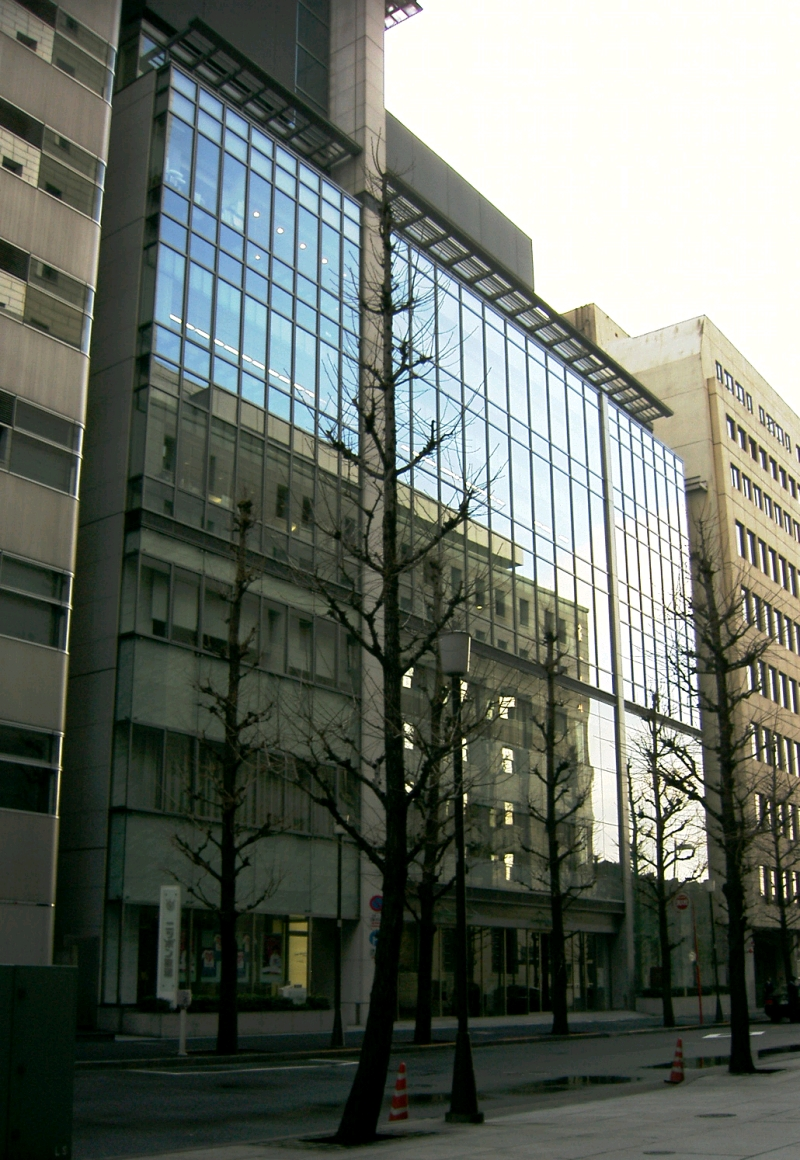
Nippon Broadcasting System headquarters in Chiyoda, Tokyo.

National Radio Network (NRN; Japanese: 全国ラジオネットワーク, romanized: Zenkoku Rajio Nettowaku) is a Japanese commercial radio network. Both Nippon Cultural Broadcasting (QR) and Nippon Broadcasting System (LF) in Tokyo serve as the network's co-flagship stations; the Fujisankei Communications Group has an influence on both stations. Established on 3 May 1965, NRN is made up of 40 regional affiliates, including eleven full-time affiliates and 31 stations that are dual-affiliated with the rival Japan Radio Network (JRN), which is a practice of "cross-networking" in Japan.

Out of the 40 affiliates, 15 NRN stations are also affiliated with JRN, and is connected with a JNN TV station, 10 are JRN/NRN dual affiliates that are connected with a Nippon TV (NNN/NNS) station, 9 are radio-only stations (Including core stations LF, QR, SF, and Radio Osaka), 3 are radio subsidiaries (NRN-only core station STV Radio, and dual JRN/NRN core stations MBS Radio & ABC Radio), 1 connected to a dual NNN/NNS & ANN affiliate (JRN/NRN station Fukui Broadcasting), 1 connected to a key ANN affiliate (NRN-only core station Kyushu Asahi Broadcasting), and 1 connected to a JAITS television station (KBS Kyoto). Previously, the Okayama-Takamatsu market (Okayama & Kagawa Prefectures), were once handled by Nishinippon Broadcasting when they joined the NRN in 1965. That all changed in 1997 when RSK Sanyo Broadcasting in Okayama, a JRN-only station in the market at that time, became a cross-net station, and joined the NRN. In turn, RNC Radio also became a cross-net station, being the last station to join the TBS Radio-led JRN that same year, making the two serve their respective areas as dual JRN-NRN affiliates unlike their television counterparts that served the entire market.

Despite no longer affiliated, Radio Kansai airs the network's late-night flagship program, "All Night Nippon", and other NRN programs due to program sales. Also, despite being a core affiliate of the network, OBC Radio Osaka carries some programming from rival JRN, which includes the BRAND NEW MORNING program. Also, All Night Nippon, and other NRN radio shows are also being aired on 2 key JRN affiliates. CBC Radio carries the flagship ANN program (Monday to Saturday), while RKB Radio carries the ANN special hosted by Japanese boy-band SixTones every Saturday, instead of NRN's core Fukuoka affiliate, KBC Radio.

With the exception of Hokkaido (HBC & STVradio) and Akita (ABS), all 44 NRN-affiliated stations are conducting AM suspension experiments as a measure to utilize their Wide FM broadcasts as per mandate by the Ministry of Communications. The suspensions will run until September 2026, with a gradual transition from AM to FM within 2028.

== List of affiliates ==
Stations are listed mostly in Japanese order of prefectures which is mirrored in ISO 3166-2:JP.

Broadcasting area(s)		Station			Frequency		Start date of broadcast	Date of affiliation	Dual affiliation with JRN	Note(s)
Prefecture	Region	On air branding	Abbr.	Call sign	AM	FM	Start date of broadcast	Date of affiliation	Dual affiliation with JRN	Note(s)
Hokkaidō		STV Radio	STV	JOWF	1440 kHz	90.4 MHz	15 December 1962	3 May 1965	No	Core station
Hokkaidō		HBC Radio	HBC	JOHR	1287 kHz	91.5 MHz	10 March 1952	3 May 1965	Yes	Core station
Aomori	Tōhoku	Aomori Hōsō	RAB	JOGR	1233 kHz	91.7 MHz	12 October 1953	1 August 1965	Yes	
Iwate	Tōhoku	Iwate Hōsō	IBC	JODF	684 kHz	90.6 MHz	25 December 1953	3 May 1965	Yes	
Miyagi	Tōhoku	Tohoku Hōsō	tbc	JOIR	1260 kHz	93.5 MHz	1 May 1952	3 May 1965	Yes	Core station
Akita	Tōhoku	Akita Hōsō	ABS	JOTR	936 kHz	90.1 MHz	1 November 1953	3 May 1965	Yes	
Yamagata	Tōhoku	Yamagata Hōsō	YBC	JOEF	918 kHz	92.4 MHz	15 October 1953	3 May 1965	Yes	
Fukushima	Tōhoku	Radio Fukushima	RFC	JOWR	1458 kHz	90.8 MHz	1 December 1953	3 May 1965	Yes	
Ibaraki	Kantō	Ibaraki Hōsō / Lucky FM	IBS	JOYF	1197 kHz	94.6 MHz	1 April 1963	1 April 2001	No	
Tochigi	Kantō	Tochigi Hōsō	CRT	JOXF	1530 kHz	94.1 MHz	1 April 1963	1978	No	
Kantō region		Bunka Hōsō	QR	JOQR	1134 kHz	91.6 MHz	31 March 1952	3 May 1965	No	Co-flagship station; core station
Kantō region		Nippon Hōsō	LF	JOLF	1242 kHz	93.0 MHz	15 July 1954	3 May 1965	No	Co-flagship station; core station
Niigata	Chūbu	Niigata Hōsō	BSN	JODR	1116 kHz	92.7 MHz	24 December 1952	1 June 1976	Yes	
Toyama	Chūbu	Kitanihon Hōsō	KNB	JOLR	738 kHz	90.2 MHz	1 July 1952	3 May 1965	Yes	
Ishikawa	Chūbu	Hokuriku Hōsō	MRO	JOMR	1107 kHz	94.0 MHz	10 May 1952	1 December 1980	Yes	
Fukui	Chūbu	Fukui Hōsō	FBC	JOPR	864 kHz	94.6 MHz	20 July 1952	3 May 1965	Yes	
Yamanashi	Chūbu	Yamanashi Hōsō	YBS	JOJF	765 kHz	90.9 MHz	1 July 1954	1 February 1979	Yes	
Nagano	Chūbu	Shin-etsu Hōsō	SBC	JOSR	1098 kHz	92.2 MHz	25 March 1952	3 May 1965	Yes	
Shizuoka	Chūbu	Shizuoka Hōsō	SBS	JOVR	1404 kHz	93.9 MHz	1 November 1952	3 May 1965	Yes	Core station
Aichi and Gifu	Chūbu	Tokai Radio	SF	JOSF	1332 kHz	92.9 MHz	1 April 1960	4 July 1965	No	Core station
Mie	Kansai	Tokai Radio	SF	JOSF	1332 kHz	92.9 MHz	1 April 1960	4 July 1965	No	Core station
Shiga	Kansai	KBS Shiga	KBS	JOBW	1215 kHz	N/A	25 May 1960	3 May 1965	No	
Kyoto	Kansai	KBS Kyoto	KBS	JOBR	1143 kHz	94.9 MHz	24 December 1951	3 May 1965	No	
Kansai region (except Mie)		Radio Osaka	OBC	JOUF	1314 kHz	91.9 MHz	1 July 1958	3 May 1965	No	Core station
Kansai region (except Mie)		MBS Radio	MBS	JOOR	1179 kHz	90.6 MHz	1 September 1951	3 May 1965	Yes	Core station
Kansai region (except Mie)		ABC Radio	ABC	JONR	1008 kHz	93.3 MHz	11 November 1951	3 May 1965	Yes	Core station
Wakayama	Kansai	Wakayama Hōsō	WBS	JOVF	1431 kHz	94.2 MHz	1 April 1959	3 May 1965	Yes	
Tottori and Shimane	Chūgoku	San-in Hōsō	BSS	JOHF	900 kHz	92.2 MHz	1 March 1954	3 May 1965	Yes	
Okayama	Chūgoku	RSK Sanyo Hōsō	RSK	JOYR	1494 kHz	91.4 MHz	1 October 1953	1 April 2019	Yes	
Hiroshima	Chūgoku	RCC Broadcasting	RCC	JOER	1350 kHz	94.6 MHz	1 October 1952	3 May 1965	Yes	Core station
Yamaguchi	Chūgoku	Yamaguchi Hōsō	KRY	JOPF	765 kHz	92.3 MHz	1 April 1956	3 May 1965	Yes	
Tokushima	Shikoku	Shikoku Hōsō	JRT	JOJR	1269 kHz	93.0 MHz	1 July 1952	15 June 1969	Yes	
Kagawa	Shikoku	Nishinippon Hōsō	RNC	JOKF	1449 kHz	90.3 MHz	1 October 1953	3 May 1965	Yes	
Ehime	Shikoku	Nankai Hōsō	RNB	JOAF	1116 kHz	91.7 MHz	1 October 1953	1 March 1979	Yes	
Kōchi	Shikoku	Kochi Hōsō	RKC	JOZR	900 kHz	90.8 MHz	1 September 1953	3 May 1965	Yes	
Fukuoka	Kyūshū	KBC Radio	KBC	JOIF	1413 kHz	90.2 MHz	1 January 1954	3 May 1965	No	Core station
Saga	Kyūshū	NBC Radio Saga	NBC	JOUO	1458 kHz	93.5 MHz	1 August 1958	16 March 1967	Yes	
Nagasaki	Kyūshū	Nagasaki Hōsō	NBC	JOUR	1233 kHz	92.6 MHz	1 March 1953	16 March 1967	Yes	
Kumamoto	Kyūshū	Kumamoto Hōsō	RKK	JOBF	1197 kHz	91.4 MHz	1 October 1953	3 May 1965	Yes	
Ōita	Kyūshū	Oita Hōsō	OBS	JOGF	1098 kHz	93.3 MHz	1 October 1953	3 May 1965	Yes	
Miyazaki	Kyūshū	Miyazaki Hōsō	MRT	JONF	936 kHz	90.4 MHz	1 July 1954	3 May 1965	Yes	
Kagoshima	Kyūshū	Minaminihon Hōsō	MBC	JOCF	1107 kHz	92.8 MHz	10 October 1953	3 May 1965	Yes	
Okinawa	Kyūshū	Radio Okinawa	ROK	JOXR	864 kHz	93.1 MHz	1 July 1960	15 May 1972	No	

=== Former affiliate station ===
Broadcasting area(s)		Station			Frequency	Years of affiliation	Current affiliation	Note(s)
Prefecture	Region	On air branding	Abbr.	Call sign	Frequency	Years of affiliation	Current affiliation	Note(s)
Hyōgo	Kansai	Radio Kansai	CRK	JOCR	560 kHz	1965–1978	Independent	Disaffiliated from NRN in Spring 1978 over the issues with night time baseball game broadcasting rights

== Programmes ==
- All Night Nippon
