= Shizuoka Broadcasting System =

Radio and television broadcaster in Shizuoka Prefecture, Japan

Shizuoka Broadcasting System Co., Ltd.
- Logo used since 2003

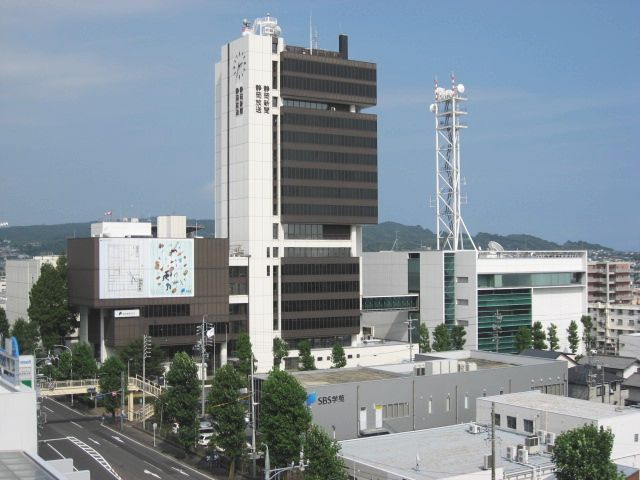
- Headquarters at the Shizuoka Shimbun-SBS building in Suruga-ku, Shizuoka
- Native name: 静岡放送株式会社
- Romanized name: Shizuoka Hōsō Kabushiki-gaisha
- Company type: Private
- Industry: Radio and television network
- Founded: 1 October 1952
- Headquarters: Toro, Suruga-ku, Shizuoka, Japan
- Key people: Nobuaki Osuga (president and CEO)
- Subsidiaries: SBS My Home Center; SBS Promotion; SBS Media Vision; SBS Information Systems
- Website: www.at-s.com

JOVR
- Shizuoka City; Japan
- Broadcast area: Shizuoka Prefecture
- Frequencies: 1404 kHz; 93.9 MHz
- Branding: SBS Radio

Programming
- Language: Japanese
- Format: Talk, Sports
- Affiliations: JRN/NRN

Ownership
- Owner: Shizuoka Broadcasting System Co., Ltd.

History
- First air date: November 1, 1952

Technical information
- Licensing authority: MIC
- Power: 10 kW (AM); 1 kW (FM)

Links
- Website: www.at-s.com/sbsradio

JOVR-DTV JOVO-TV (defunct)
- Shizuoka Prefecture; Japan
- City: Shizuoka City
- Channels: Digital: 15 (UHF); Virtual: 6
- Branding: SBS Television

Programming
- Affiliations: Japan News Network

Ownership
- Owner: Shizuoka Broadcasting System Co., Ltd.

History
- First air date: November 1, 1958; March 1, 1960 (JOVO-TV)
- Last air date: July 24, 2011 (JOVO-TV)
- Former call signs: JOVR-TV (1958–2011)
- Former channel numbers: 11 (analog, VHF, 1958–2011); JOVO-TV: 6 (analog, VHF, 1960–2011)

Technical information
- Licensing authority: MIC

Links
- Website: www.at-s.com/sbstv

Shizuoka Broadcasting System, Inc. (静岡放送株式会社, Shizuoka Hōsō Kabushiki-gaisha; SBS) is a Japanese broadcaster in Shizuoka. Its radio station is affiliated with Japan Radio Network (JRN) and National Radio Network (NRN), and its TV station is affiliated with JNN (Japan News Network).

Despite being one of the quasi-key JNN & JRN affiliates outside of the Five-Company Agreement Stations (TBS, HBC, CBC, MBS, RKB), Shizuoka Broadcasting's radio division is a core NRN affiliate, in which the station has dedicated lines for NRN programming distribution. It is one of 3 JRN-affiliated stations who are core NRN stations. The other 2 being RCC and TBC.

== History ==
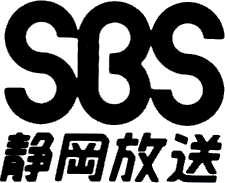
Former logo, from 1972 to 2003

After the establishment of the "Three Radio Laws" (Radio Law, Broadcasting Law, and Radio Supervisory Committee Establishment Law) in 1950, private broadcasting companies began to appear across Japan.At its first meeting in March 1951, several companies, politicians, and financial institutions elected Shuntaro Katsuta (the then vice president of Shinano Mainichi Shimbun) as the president of Shinano Broadcasting. On October 18 of the same year, they obtained a preparatory broadcast license. In July 1951, then Shizuoka Shimbun president Mitsunosuke Oishi also intended to apply for a private broadcasting license, but at that time other groups had already applied for a broadcasting license in the name of "Shizuoka Broadcasting". With the help of the local financial circles, they finally agreed to change the "Shizuoka Broadcasting" to Shizuoka Shimbun as the main body, and obtained the broadcasting license in September 1952. On October 1 of the same year, Shizuoka Broadcasting was formally established and began broadcasting programs one month later on November 1. It was the 17th private radio station in Japan. As Radio Shizuoka, broadcasts started on November 1, 1952, as the seventeenth commercial radio station to open in Japan. Initially it broadcast on 1450kc, but on August 1, 1953, the station moved to 1400kc.

In September 1953, Shizuoka Broadcasting applied for a television broadcasting license, but it was not obtained until February 1958, five years later. On November 1, 1958, Shizuoka Broadcasting System began broadcasting television programs and was the 12th private television station overall in Japan. The following year, Shizuoka Broadcasting joined the JNN network and was able to significantly reduce the cost of delivering news images. According to a survey in May 1965, Shizuoka Broadcasting accounted for an average daily viewing share of 73.6% in Shizuoka Prefecture. After Shizuoka TV, the second private TV station in Shizuoka Prefecture, started broadcasting, in November 1971, Shizuoka Broadcasting still maintained this figure at 50.7%. In the early days of broadcasting, the Shizuoka Broadcasting Department's broadcast time was only 5 hours and 23 minutes a day. In May 1963, Shizuoka Broadcasting began to broadcast television programs in the morning. Three years later, in October 1968, Shizuoka Broadcasting Television began to gradually implement all-day broadcasting. In May 1967, Shizuoka Broadcasting began broadcasting color TV programs for the first time.

The abbreviation, SBS, has been used since September 22, 1960. Color broadcasts started on September 26, 1965, for networked programming and on September 1, 1966, for local programming. On October 1, 1969, less than a year after TV Shizuoka signed on as most of Fuji TV's shows moved to SUT as it joined FNN/FNS.

Shizuoka Broadcasting was initially located in the headquarters of Shizuoka Shimbun News Agency, but as business increased and the space gradually became insufficient, it was decided to build a new headquarters. In March 1970, the new headquarters of Shizuoka Broadcasting was completed. The building was designed by the famous architect Kenzo Tange. It has 18 floors above ground and 1 floor underground, with a total floor area of 33,000 square meters. It is the joint headquarters of Shizuoka Broadcasting and Shizuoka Shimbun. In August 1972, on the occasion of the 20th anniversary of the launch, Shizuoka Broadcasting System held the "Shizuoka Carnival" (フェスタしずおか) event and broadcast a live video of the event. In 1985, Shizuoka Broadcasting System and five other radio and television broadcasting companies in Shizuoka Prefecture visited Zhejiang Province, China, and six stations also jointly produced a documentary. It was the first attempt by Shizuoka stations to jointly produce a TV program. Starting in 1993, Shizuoka Broadcasting dispatched special correspondents to the JNN New York branch, also the first overseas correspondent of Shizuoka Broadcasting System.

In order to adapt to the equipment needs of the digital TV era, Shizuoka Broadcasting began building a broadcast center in February 2000 to serve as its new headquarters in the digital TV era. In April 2001, the broadcasting center was completed. It has 5 floors above ground and is 70 meters high when including the iron tower. It has a total floor area of 4,608 square meters and is connected to the main building by a sky bridge. Shizuoka Broadcasting launched the current trademark in 2003. On June 1, 2005, Shizuoka Broadcasting System began broadcasting digital television signals, becoming the first private television station in Shizuoka Prefecture to begin broadcasting digital television. On July 24, 2011, Shizuoka Broadcasting stopped broadcasting analog TV signals. In the same year, on October 3, Shizuoka Broadcasting began broadcasting programs on the Internet radio service Radiko.

== See also ==
- Shizuoka Shimbun
