= Yamanashi Broadcasting System =

Radio and television station in Yamanashi Prefecture, Japan

Yamanashi Broadcasting System Inc.
- Logo used since 2001

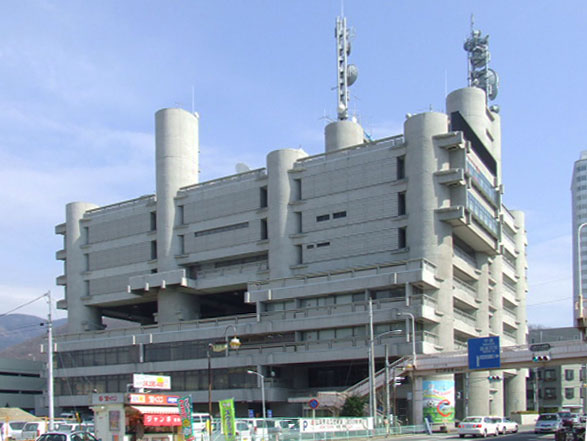
- Headquarters in Kofu, Yamanashi
- Native name: 株式会社山梨放送
- Romanized name: Kabushikigaisha Yamanashihōsō
- Formerly: Radio Yamanashi Co., Ltd. (March 25, 1954 – October 31, 1961)
- Type: Kabushiki gaisha
- Industry: Television and Radio broadcasting
- Founded: March 25, 1954
- Headquarters: 2-6-10 Kitaguchi, Kofu City, Yamanashi Prefecture, Japan
- Key people: Eiichi Noguchi (President and CEO)
- Website: www.ybs.jp
- Footnotes; Data from its Corporate Profile

JOJF
- Kōfu; Japan
- Broadcast area: Yamanashi Prefecture
- Frequency: 90.9 MHz
- Branding: YBS Radio

Programming
- Language: Japanese
- Format: Talk, Sports
- Affiliations: JRN/NRN

Ownership
- Owner: Yamanashi Broadcasting System, Inc.

History
- First air date: July 1, 1954
- Former frequencies: 765 kHz (1954-2026)
- Call sign meaning: Japan/Mount Fuji

Technical information
- Licensing authority: MIC
- Power: 5 kW (AM); 1 kW (FM)

JOJF-DTV
- Yamanashi Prefecture; Japan
- City: Kōfu
- Channels: Digital: 25 (UHF); Virtual: 4
- Branding: YBS Yamanashi Broadcasting; YBS Television

Programming
- Language: Japanese
- Affiliations: Nippon News Network and Nippon Television Network System

Ownership
- Owner: Yamanashi Broadcasting System Inc.

History
- First air date: December 20, 1959
- Former call signs: JOJF-TV (1959–2011)
- Former channel numbers: Analog: 5 (VHF, 1959–2011)

Technical information
- Licensing authority: MIC

Yamanashi Broadcasting System (株式会社山梨放送, Kabushiki-gaisha Yamanashi Hōsō), also known as YBS, is a Japanese broadcast network based in Kōfu, Yamanashi. Its radio division, callsign JOJF is an affiliate of the Japan Radio Network and the National Radio Network while its television division, callsign JOJF-DTV (channel 4) is an affiliate of the Nippon News Network and the Nippon Television Network System. Both stations serve Yamanashi Prefecture with its studios and headquarters being located in the Shinkonya District of Kōfu.

== History ==
The Yamanashi Sannichi Shimbun News Agency applied for a broadcasting license for commercial radio broadcasting in 1925 and actually launched test radio broadcasts. Following the end of the war, the "Three Radio Laws" were passed in 1950, enabling commercial broadcasters to appear.

In Yamanashi Prefecture, from 1952 to 1953, three factions, centered on local industrialist Tadahiko Natori, the Yamanashi Daily News, and the Yamanashi Jiji News, appeared to apply for commercial broadcasting licenses. After that, the first two factions merged to form Radio Yamanashi, and the Yamanashi Shimbun faction applied to open a commercial broadcast under the name of Yamanashi Broadcasting. Radio Yamanashi was officially registered and established in March 1953, and launched a test radio signal on June 18 of the same year. Under the advice of the Postal Ministry, Radio Yamanashi and Yamanashi Broadcasting jointly applied for a broadcast license on July 26, 1953.

At 11:40 am on July 1, 1954, Radio Yamanashi officially started broadcasting, becoming the first commercial radio station in Yamanashi Prefecture. In May 1956, Yamanashi Radio issued 60,000 new shares and increased its capital to 60 million yen. Also in fiscal year 1956, Yamanashi Radio turned a profit. On December 1, 1956, Radio Yamanashi opened the Fujiyoshida relay station, greatly expanding its coverage. In 1957, Yamanashi Radio realized dividends.

Radio Yamanashi applied to the Ministry of Postal Affairs to establish a television station on July 24, 1956. Similar to the situation when the radio station was launched, the Yamanashi Jiji News Agency also applied for a separate television broadcast license under the name of "Yamanashi Television Broadcasting" (Yamanashi Telecasting). On October 22, 1957, Radio Yamanashi obtained a preliminary television license, with the frequency being channel 5. In May 1959, just before the launch of television, Yamanashi Radio increased its capital again to 120 million yen. On the eve of the broadcast, taking into account the superior advertising business conditions proposed by Nippon Television, RYC decided to join the Nippon Television network. On November 13, 1959, Radio Yamanashi launched a TV test signal and began trial broadcasting on December 13. On December 20, RYC Television officially launched. In the early days of broadcasting, Radio Yamanashi broadcast for 5 hours from Monday to Saturday and 11 hours on Sunday.

As the television division surpassed the radio division as Radio Yamanashi's main source of income, Radio Yamanashi changed its company name to Yamanashi Broadcasting in 1961. In 1962, Yamanashi Broadcasting started broadcasting in the mornings, and in that year it was broadcast at Mount Fuji Television Station. Yamanashi Broadcasting began broadcasting color television on October 1, 1964, and broadcast the 1964 Olympic Games in color.

In 1961, Yamanashi Broadcasting and Yamanashi Nikichi Shimbun decided to build a new headquarters and purchased land at the north exit of Kofu Station for 147.6 million yen as the land for the new headquarters. At the same time, the famous architect Kenzo Tange was invited to serve as the designer of the new headquarters. Named the Yamanashi Bunka Kaikan, it has 8 floors and was completed in 1966. In the same year, Yamanashi Broadcasting joined NNN.

In 2006, YBS started digital broadcasting. It ceased analog operations on July 24, 2011.

AM broadcasts on 765 kHz ended on March 1, 2026.
