= Shikoku Broadcasting =

Radio and television broadcaster in Tokushima Prefecture, Japan

Shikoku Broadcasting Co., Ltd.
- Logo used since 1982

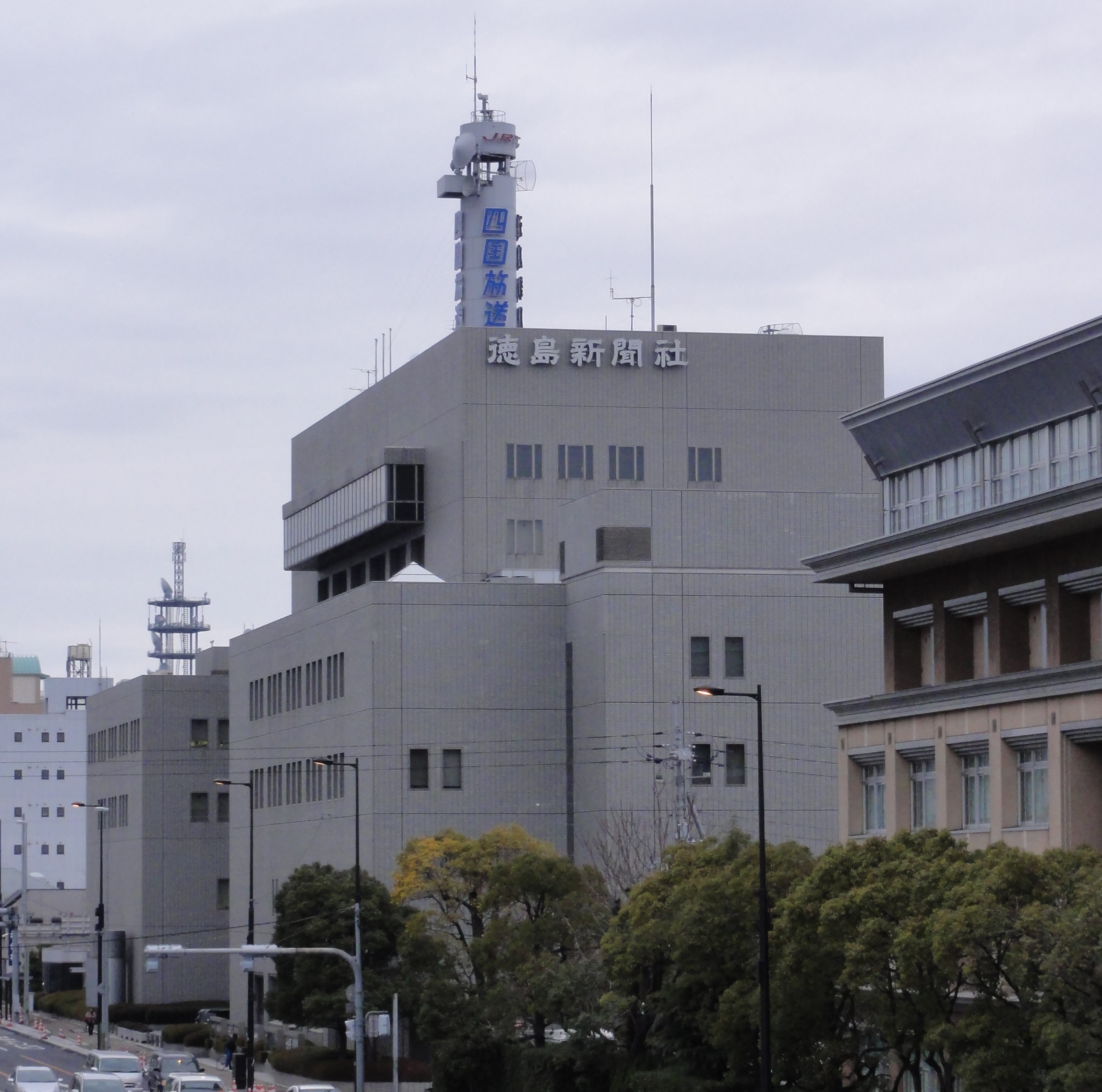
- Current headquarters for both Shikoku Broadcasting and Tokushima Shimbun
- Trade name: JRT
- Native name: 四国放送株式会社
- Romanized name: Shikoku Hōsō Kabushiki-gaisha
- Type: Kabushiki kaisha
- Industry: Media
- Founded: April 7, 1952; 74 years ago
- Headquarters: 2-5-2 Nakatokushima, Tokushima City, Tokushima Prefecture, Japan
- Key people: Okamoto Nao (President and CEO)
- Number of employees: 118 (April 2021)
- Website: jrt.co.jp
- Footnotes; Data from its Corporate Profile

JOJR
- Tokushima; Japan
- Broadcast area: Tokushima Prefecture
- Frequencies: 1269 kHZ (AM); 93.0 MHz (FM)
- Branding: Shikoku Broadcasting Radio

Programming
- Language: Japanese
- Format: Talk, Sports
- Affiliations: JRN/NRN

Ownership
- Owner: Shikoku Broadcasting Co., Ltd.

History
- First air date: July 1, 1952

Technical information
- Licensing authority: MIC

Links
- Website: jrt.co.jp/radio/

JOJR-DTV
- Tokushima Prefecture; Japan
- City: Tokushima
- Channels: Digital: 31 (UHF); Virtual: 1
- Branding: Shikoku Broadcasting Television; JRT

Programming
- Affiliations: Nippon News Network and Nippon Television Network System

Ownership
- Owner: Shikoku Broadcasting Co., Ltd.

History
- First air date: April 1, 1959
- Former call signs: JOJR-TV (1959–2011)
- Former channel numbers: Analog: 1 (VHF; 1959–2011)
- Former affiliations: All secondary: Fuji TV/FNN/FNS, NET/ANN, TBS/JNN (1959-1972)

Technical information
- Licensing authority: MIC

Links
- Website: jrt.co.jp/tv/

Shikoku Broadcasting Co., Ltd. (Note: 四国放送株式会社, Shikoku Hōsō Kabushiki-gaisha) is a Japanese regional broadcaster based in Tokushima. The station's radio division, Shikoku Broadcasting Radio, callsign JOJR is affiliated with the Japan Radio Network and the National Radio Network while its television division, Shikoku Broadcasting Television, callsign JOJR-DTV (channel 1) serves as an affiliate of the Nippon News Network and the Nippon Television Network System. Both stations serve Tokushima Prefecture with its headquarters and studios being located in the Nakatokushima ward of Tokushima.

Despite holding a local monopoly in commercial television to the prefecture, commercial television stations from the Kansai region are easily available.

== History ==
=== Founding on radio ===
After the establishment of the "Three Radio Laws" (Radio Law, Broadcasting Law, and Radio Supervisory Committee Establishment Law) in 1950, Japan established a system where public broadcasting (NHK) and commercial broadcasting coexisted. Uesaki Ryujiro and other Tokushima businessmen established Shikoku Broadcasting in August of the same year and applied for a private broadcasting license In April of the following year, Shikoku Broadcasting obtained a preparatory license for that aim. On March 31, 1952, Shikoku Broadcasting held its founding general meeting with a capital of 25 million yen and 50,000 shares issued. At the same time, Shikoku Broadcasting decided to build a headquarters building in Shinmachi, Tokushima City. In June of the same year, Shikoku Broadcasting officially obtained a broadcasting license after successfully launching test broadcasts.

On July 1, 1952, Shikoku Broadcasting, branded as JR (as in JOJR) officially started broadcasting, becoming the first private broadcasting station in Shikoku. In the second year of broadcasting, Shikoku Broadcasting achieved a balance of payments and established a branch in Wakayama. In order to reduce program production costs and increase advertising revenue, Shikoku Broadcasting also formed a Shikoku Broadcasting Alliance with Kagawa Radio (now Nishinippon Broadcasting) that year to simulcast radio programs. With the improvement of the operating conditions of the two stations and the improvement of the program self-control ability, the alliance was dissolved in 1956. In 1954, the president of Shikoku Broadcasting was changed to Maekawa Shizuo of Tokushima Shimbun. On the same year, Shikoku Broadcasting also increased the transmission power to 10 kilowatts (500 watts at night), which expanded the signal coverage area by 30%. The Shikoku Broadcasting Wakayama Branch set up a recording studio in 1956, making the Wakayama Branch not only an advertising business base, but also a base to produce its own programs, which gained local audiences. When the Nankai Maru shipwreck occurred in 1958, Shikoku Broadcasting quickly mobilized employees other than journalists to report on the accident, for which they were awarded the President's Award by the Federation of Democratic People's Liberation.

=== Entry into television ===
On August 18, 1955, Shikoku Broadcasting applied for a TV broadcasting license, and obtained a preliminary license in October 1957. At the end of 1958, Shikoku Broadcasting decided that the TV department would join the Nippon Television Network, and obtained the official broadcasting license on March 23 of the following year, and began trial broadcasting on March 25. Shikoku Broadcasting originally planned to start broadcasting TV in July 1959, but was stimulated by NHK Tokushima's start of television broadcasts on March 15, and decided to advance the launch date to April 1. In 1961, Shikoku Broadcasting began to build the second phase of the headquarters building and it was completed in March of the following year. In 1963, Shikoku Broadcasting sent a cameraman to Burma to shoot a documentary, which was the first overseas interview by Shikoku Broadcasting.

On October 1, the eve of the opening of the 1964 Tokyo Olympics, Shikoku Broadcasting broadcast a program in color for the first time. At that time, Shikoku Broadcasting broadcast 2.5 hours of color programs every day. Five years later, in 1969, Shikoku Broadcasting's self-produced programs also began to be produced in color. The total revenue of Shikoku Broadcasting exceeded 1 billion yen for the first time in 1967, and exceeded 2 billion yen in 1972 on the 20th anniversary of its launch. In 1975, with the launch of Wakayama TV, Shikoku Broadcasting closed the Wakayama branch. In the same year, Shikoku Broadcasting's turnover exceeded 3 billion yen.

Starting in 1978, Shikoku Broadcasting became one of the organizers of the Awa Tanuki Festival. In the same year, Shikoku Broadcasting sent reporters to the NNN Bangkok branch, becoming the first overseas correspondent of Shikoku Broadcasting. The following year, Shikoku Broadcasting introduced the electronic news gathering (ENG) system to improve the efficiency of news gathering and editing. In 1982, Shikoku Broadcasting began to use "JRT" as the company abbreviation. In January 1983, Shikoku Broadcasting began construction of a new headquarters building in Nakatokushima Town, Tokushima City, and it was completed in November of the following year. The building has one floor underground and seven floors above ground, with a total floor area of 20,790 square meters. The north side of the first to fifth floors and the sixth floor are used by Shikoku Broadcasting, and the south side of the first to fifth floors is used by Tokushima Shimbun. There are two television studios in this building, and the main television control room is located on the third floor. In 1988, Shikoku Broadcasting's profit reached a record high of 1.06 billion yen. In the same year, Shikoku Broadcasting also began broadcasting stereo TV programs. In 1989, Shikoku Broadcasting and NHK jointly produced a special program on Awa Odori. In 1990, Shikoku Broadcasting's turnover exceeded 7 billion yen for the first time.

In order to adapt to the arrival of the digital TV era, Shikoku Broadcasting realized the digitization of the main control room in 1997. On October 1, 2006, Shikoku Broadcasting began broadcasting digital TV signals, and stopped broadcasting analog TV signals on July 24, 2011.

== Radio ==
Shikoku Broadcasting originally planned to broadcast the professional baseball All-Star Game on the first day of the broadcast, but due to heavy rain on the day of the game, the game was postponed, and Shikoku Broadcasting did not plan a replacement program, so it had to suspend the broadcast for a long time in the afternoon of the first broadcasting day. In the early days of broadcasting, Shikoku Broadcasting's broadcast time was divided into morning and evening periods. It broadcast from 06:00 to 10:00 and from 17:30 to 23:13. The program types are mainly music, agriculture, and sports broadcasts. In 1953, Shikoku Broadcasting's broadcast time was extended to 17 hours. In 1965, the Shikoku Broadcasting Department joined the JRN network. At the same time, in order to gain new audiences and change the situation of being continuously deprived of audiences by TV, Shikoku Broadcasting began 24 hour broadcasting on that year, and arranged programs for young audiences in the middle of the night. In 1969, Shikoku Broadcasting joined NRN to further enrich its program sources.

In 1979, Shikoku Broadcasting broadcast a 10-hour special program "Hometown Train Line" (ふるさと車が行く), which received full cooperation from Japan's state-owned railways. In 1992, on the 40th anniversary of its founding, Shikoku Broadcasting broadcast a 40-hour live special program "I Love Tokushima" (アイラブ・トクシマ, いきいきラジオ). Starting in 2015, JRT Radio has joined Radiko, and its programs can also be listened online in Japan.

Shikoku Broadcasting Radio became the 6th radio station in Japan to suspend its main AM station and its relays entirely, with the main Tokushima station shutting down on March 23, 2026, as it transitions to full, Wide-FM broadcasts.

== Television ==
Shikoku Broadcasting insisted on daily self-made programs in the early days of broadcasting, which was very rare among local TV stations in Japan at the time. In its second year of broadcasting, Shikoku Broadcasting tried its own TV drama program "TV Little Theater". In 1969, JR Television conducted Japan's first televised political opinion presentation during the Tokushima Prefecture governor election.

Tokushima Prefecture is known as "Radio Ginza" due to the lack of terrain blocking, and can receive signals from various TV stations in Kansai. In this case, strengthening the local characteristics of the program and distinguishing it from Kansai TV stations has become an important challenge for Shikoku Broadcasting. In 1971, Shikoku Broadcasting began broadcasting the "Good Morning Tokushima" program, which was initially broadcast every Saturday morning. The program and Aomori Broadcasting's "RAB News Radar" are listed as the pioneers of large-scale local news programs in Japan. The first episode of Good Morning Tokushima was recorded and broadcast. Audience reaction was muted. But since the second period, the program was broadcast live, and the response to the program has also increased rapidly. Good Morning Tokushima became a strip program airing Monday to Friday in 1972, and its ratings exceeded 20% for the first time in October 1973, becoming the first morning program on private television to catch up with NHK in ratings. The cooking section of "Morning Island" published a book in 1999 and sold 23,000 copies, setting an unprecedented record in the history of Tokushima publishing. In 1993, Shikoku Broadcasting established a new morning program "Chao 645" (later renamed "Chao 630") to further strengthen the morning information program. In 2010, "Good Morning Tokushima" and "Chao 630" were integrated into "Morning Tokushima Plus". But in 2011, "Morning Tokushima Plus" stopped broadcasting.

In 1982, Shikoku Broadcasting began broadcasting a 30-minute large-scale news program "Focus Tokushima" from Monday to Friday evenings. In addition to national news produced by Nippon Television, Shikoku Broadcasting broadcasts one hour of news every Monday to Friday at 18:00. In 1985, "Focus Tokushima" and "Good Morning Tokushima" both received high ratings of more than 30%. In 1999, Shikoku Broadcasting began to broadcast the "530 Focus Tokushima" program to strengthen the evening news program. In 2008, the program was renamed "ゴジカル! " and the broadcast time was extended. Together with "Focus Tokushima", it constituted a news section of more than 2 hours in the evening.

The TV station is part of the Nippon Television Network (NNN/NNS) and is the only commercial TV station in Tokushima Prefecture. This is because TV stations from neighboring prefectures could be received in a wide area centered on the coast of Tokushima Prefecture. In addition, New Tokushima Broadcasting was scheduled to open as the second station, and was even given a call sign (JOTI, later reassigned to ANN affiliate KKB), but the company could not be established by the deadline, and the preliminary license was revoked. The LCN is "1" from channel 1 of the former analog master station. It is the only commercial television station in Japan that broadcasts programs from all five Japanese commercial television networks (Nippon Television, TBS, Fuji TV, TV Asahi and TV Tokyo).

In the past (before 1967) when the UHF band was not widely used, most of Wakayama Prefecture was seen as a poor reception area for the Kinki stations, and the JRT on the opposite side of the shore (sea propagation) was received well by overspill. Because of this, many households received this station. Even now, JRT program schedules are included in the TV section of national newspapers for Wakayama Prefecture.
