= Yamaguchi Broadcasting =

Radio and television station in Yamaguchi Prefecture

Yamaguchi Broadcasting Co., Ltd.
- Logo used since 1983

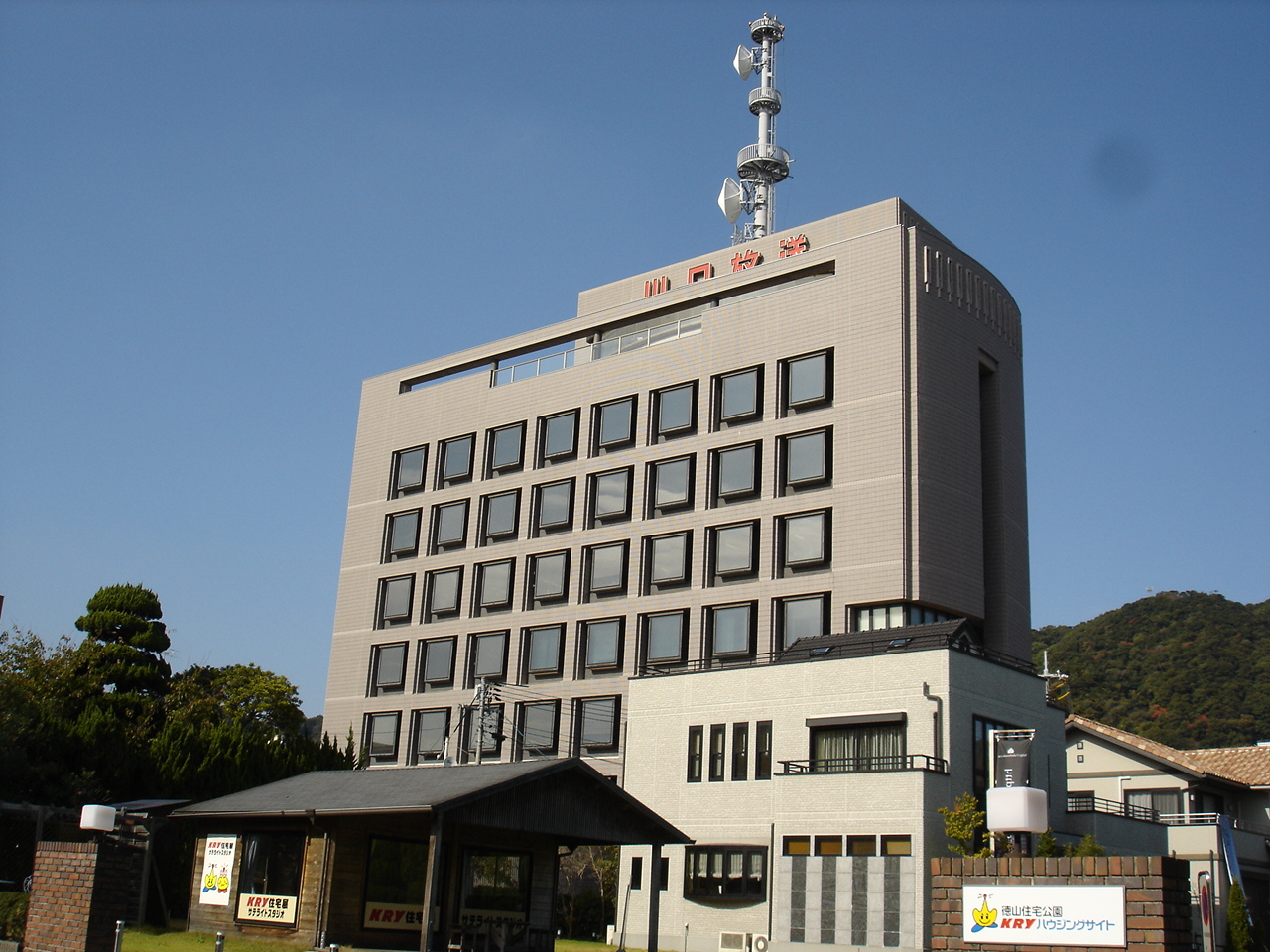
- Headquarters in Shunan, Yamaguchi
- Trade name: KRY
- Native name: 山口放送株式会社
- Romanized name: Yamaguchihōsō kabushikigaisha
- Type: Kabushiki gaisha
- Industry: Television & Radio broadcasting
- Founded: March 6, 1956
- Headquarters: 5853-2, Oaza-Tokuyama, Shunan City, Yamaguchi Prefecture, Japan
- Key people: Yukio Iwata (Chairman and Representative Director); Nobuyoshi Hayashi (President and CEO)
- Number of employees: 113 (2020)
- Website: kry.co.jp
- Footnotes; Data from its Company Profile

JOPF
- Shūnan; Japan
- Broadcast area: Yamaguchi Prefecture
- Frequencies: 765 kHz (AM); 92.3 MHz (FM)
- Branding: KRY Radio

Programming
- Language: Japanese
- Format: Talk, Sports
- Affiliations: JRN/NRN

History
- First air date: April 1, 1956

Technical information
- Licensing authority: MIC
- Power: 5 kW (AM); 1 kW (FM)

Links
- Website: kry.co.jp/radio

JOPF-DTV
- Yamaguchi Prefecture; Japan
- City: Shūnan
- Channels: Digital: 20 (UHF); Virtual: 4
- Branding: KRY Television

Programming
- Language: Japanese
- Affiliations: Nippon News Network and Nippon Television Network System

Ownership
- Owner: Yamaguchi Broadcasting Co., Ltd.

History
- First air date: October 1, 1959
- Former call signs: JOPF-TV (1959–2011)
- Former channel numbers: Analog: 11 (VHF, 1959–2011)

Technical information
- Licensing authority: MIC

Links
- Website: kry.co.jp/tv

JOPM-TV (defunct) (Satellite of JOPF-TV)
- Yamaguchi Prefecture; Japan
- City: Shimonoseki
- Channels: Analog: 4 (VHF)

History
- First air date: September 30, 1964
- Last air date: July 24, 2011

Yamaguchi Broadcasting Co., Ltd. (山口放送株式会社, Yamaguchihōsō kabushikigaisha; KRY) is a Japanese television and radio broadcasting company serving the city of Shūnan and Yamaguchi Prefecture. The initials come from K. K. Radio Yamaguchi.

== History ==
In 1953, the mayors of Tokuyama City, Shimotatsu City, and Hikari City in Yamaguchi Prefecture agreed to establish a radio station. Represented by the then Tokuyama City Council Speaker Yukihiko Kunihiro, they applied for the establishment of a radio station in the name of "Radio Yamaguchi". Two years later, on July 8, 1955, RYC received a preliminary license. In December of the same year, RYC launched a public offering and received investment from local companies such as Tokuyama Soda, with a cumulative investment of 35 million yen. At 5:40am on April 1, 1956, KRY officially began broadcasting. Yamaguchi Radio set up a relay station in Hagi City the year after it started broadcasting, so that Yamaguchi Radio programs could also be heard in the Hagi and Nagato areas. In October 1958, Yamaguchi Radio opened a relay station in Shimonoseki City, the largest city in Yamaguchi Prefecture. KRY's advertising revenue also increased rapidly, its turnover increased from 73.58 million yen in the first year to 115.3 million yen in the third year, and its profit also increased from 2.56 million yen to 7.67 million yen, and in the second year Stock dividends were held.

In October 1957, Radio Yamaguchi obtained a preparatory television license and began preparing to broadcast television. In order to meet the equipment requirements for broadcasting television, KRY built a two-story new headquarters in Tokuyama City Park District. On October 1, 1959, KRY officially began broadcasting television programs as Radio Yamaguchi Television. At that time, Radio Chugoku in Hiroshima Prefecture to the east of Yamaguchi Prefecture (now RCC Broadcasting) and RKB Mainichi Broadcasting in Fukuoka Prefecture to the west were both members of the Radio Tokyo Television network, while Fuji Television and NET had not yet prepared for syndicated broadcasts because they had just launched. As a result, KRY decided to affiliate with Nippon Television to gain business advantages. In the first TV ratings survey in the Tokuyama area in 1960, KRY accounted for 18 programs among the top 20 programs. In the same year, Yamaguchi Radio opened a broadcast relay station in Iwakuni City in the east.

In 1961, the television division of Radio Yamaguchi obtained a television broadcast license for Shimonoseki (the closed area), making Yamaguchi Radio's television programs also available in the western Yamaguchi Prefecture and Kitakyushu areas. However, this also resulted in the Kitakyushu area being able to watch the programs of two members of the Nippon Television Network (the other one was Television Nishinippon Corporation, which was a NTV affiliate at that time), resulting in competition between members of the same network and was one of the reasons that TNC withdrew from the NTV network. On June 1 of the same year, in response to the fact that television has surpassed radio as the main source of income, RYC Yamaguchi changed the company name to Yamaguchi Broadcasting and increased its capital to 230 million yen. The following year, the new headquarters of Yamaguchi Broadcasting was completed, with a construction area of 2,696 square meters, which greatly improved Yamaguchi Broadcasting's TV program production space. In the same year, Yamaguchi Broadcasting also opened TV signal relay stations in Hagi and Iwakuni. The TV signal basically covered the entire Yamaguchi Prefecture. In 1965, Yamaguchi Broadcasting went to Hawaii to cover the Yamaguchi Prefecture Tourism and Product Exhibition, which was the first time Yamaguchi Broadcasting went overseas.

On October 1, 1967, Yamaguchi Broadcasting began broadcasting color television programs. At that time, color programs accounted for 16.3% of all Yamaguchi Broadcasting programs, and 35% during prime time. Five years later, in 1972, Yamaguchi Broadcasting achieved colorization of all programs. Also in 1967, the conflict between labor and management of Yamaguchi Broadcasting intensified, and there was an incident where management blocked the headquarters of Yamaguchi Broadcasting for 59 days from May 6 to July 3. In 1969, Yamaguchi Broadcasting fully introduced an automatic program control device (APS) to realize program broadcast automation. The following year, Yamaguchi Broadcasting opened a new television studio with an area of 238 square meters. The 1975 Japan Private Broadcasting Conference was held in Tokuyama City. Yamaguchi Broadcasting, as one of the organizers, fully supported this conference. In 1978, Yamaguchi Broadcasting built the KRY Yamaguchi Broadcasting Building in front of the Yamaguchi Prefectural Office. The building is 8 stories high and has a construction area of 4,000 square meters. The first floor houses Yamaguchi Broadcasting's studio and auxiliary control room, the second floor is an exhibition space, the third to eighth floors are for rent, and there is a parking lot underground. In 1979, Yamaguchi Broadcasting began to broadcast stereo TV programs, becoming the first private television station to broadcast stereo programs outside the Kinki region in Western Japan. In the same year, Yamaguchi Broadcasting also signed a sister station agreement with South Korea's Masan MBC.

In August 1985, Yamaguchi Broadcasting began construction of a new nine-story headquarters building, which was completed in September of the following year. In 1988, Yamaguchi Broadcasting launched its current trademark. The following year, Yamaguchi Broadcasting introduced the satellite news broadcast (SNG) system. Yamaguchi Broadcasting has begun televising the Hofu Yomiuri Marathon in 1990, and has joined Taiwan Broadcast Network in some Japanese TV networks in Western Japan. The following year, Yamaguchi Broadcasting produced the Tomo Kazama starring in the Bakumatsu period drama "Ruyan Yoshida Shoin" (火の如く Yoshida Shoin), which was broadcast nationwide on the Nippon Television Network.

In 1993, with the launch of Yamaguchi Asahi Broadcasting, the third private TV station in Yamaguchi Prefecture, Yamaguchi Broadcasting no longer broadcast TV Asahi programs and became a full member of the Nippon Television Network. Yamaguchi Broadcasting won the triple crown in annual ratings in 1995, the first time Yamaguchi Broadcasting received this honor. By 2006, Yamaguchi Broadcasting had won the triple crown of ratings for 12 consecutive years. In 1996, Yamaguchi Broadcasting opened its official website. In 2001, Yamaguchi Broadcasting held Claude's exhibition at the Yamaguchi Prefectural Museum of Art. The Monet exhibition attracted 265,000 visitors, setting a record at the time for the Yamaguchi Prefectural Museum of Art.

In preparation for broadcasting digital television signals, Yamaguchi Broadcasting completed the Digital Broadcasting Center in 2005. On October 1 of the following year, Yamaguchi Broadcasting began to broadcast digital TV programs, and stopped broadcasting analog TV signals on July 24, 2011.

KRY announced a suspension of its AM signal from February 5, 2024 to January 31, 2025 (the suspension was extended until September 30, 2026), in preparation for the definitive shutdown of AM radio signals in Japan by 2028. As of this writing, KRY Radio (Also known as FM KRY) are currently airing their programs on Standard FM (86.4MHz) & Wide FM (92.3MHz) only, being the 1st in Japan to fully integrate all of its programs to the FM frequency spectrum.
