= Shizuoka Shimbun =

Japanese daily newspaper

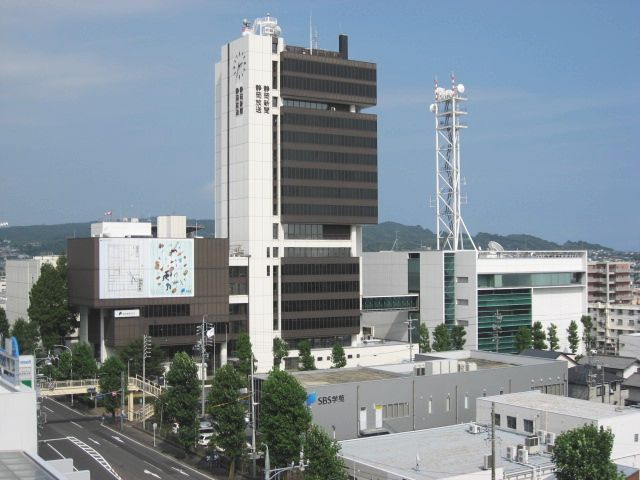
- Shizuoka Shimbun-SBS Building, the headquarters of Shizuoka Shimbun, in Shizuoka
- Type: Daily newspaper
- Format: Broadsheet
- Founded: December 1, 1942
- Language: Japanese
- Headquarters: 3-1-1 Toro, Suruga-ku, Shizuoka, Japan
- City: Shizuoka
- Country: Japan
- Circulation: 553,000 (as of 2021)
- Website: http://www.at-s.com/

Shizuoka Shimbun (静岡新聞, Shizuoka shinbun; lit. Shizuoka newspaper) is a Japanese language daily newspaper. The company is associated with the Shizuoka Broadcasting System (SBS) group.

The newspaper was founded on December 1, 1941, by the merger of the Shizuoka Minyu Shimbun (静岡民友新聞) with the Shizuoka Shimpo (静岡新報), Hamamatsu Shimbun (浜松新聞), Numazu Godo Shimbun (沼津合同新聞), Shimizu Shimbun (清水新聞) and the Atami Mainichi Shimbun (熱海毎日新聞). The first color edition was printed in 1961. From May 10, 1964, the Sunday and holiday evening editions were discontinued. From April 2011, the Saturday evening edition was discontinued.
