= Tohoku Broadcasting Company =

Radio and television station in Sendai, Japan

Tohoku Broadcasting Co., Ltd.
- Logo used since 2020

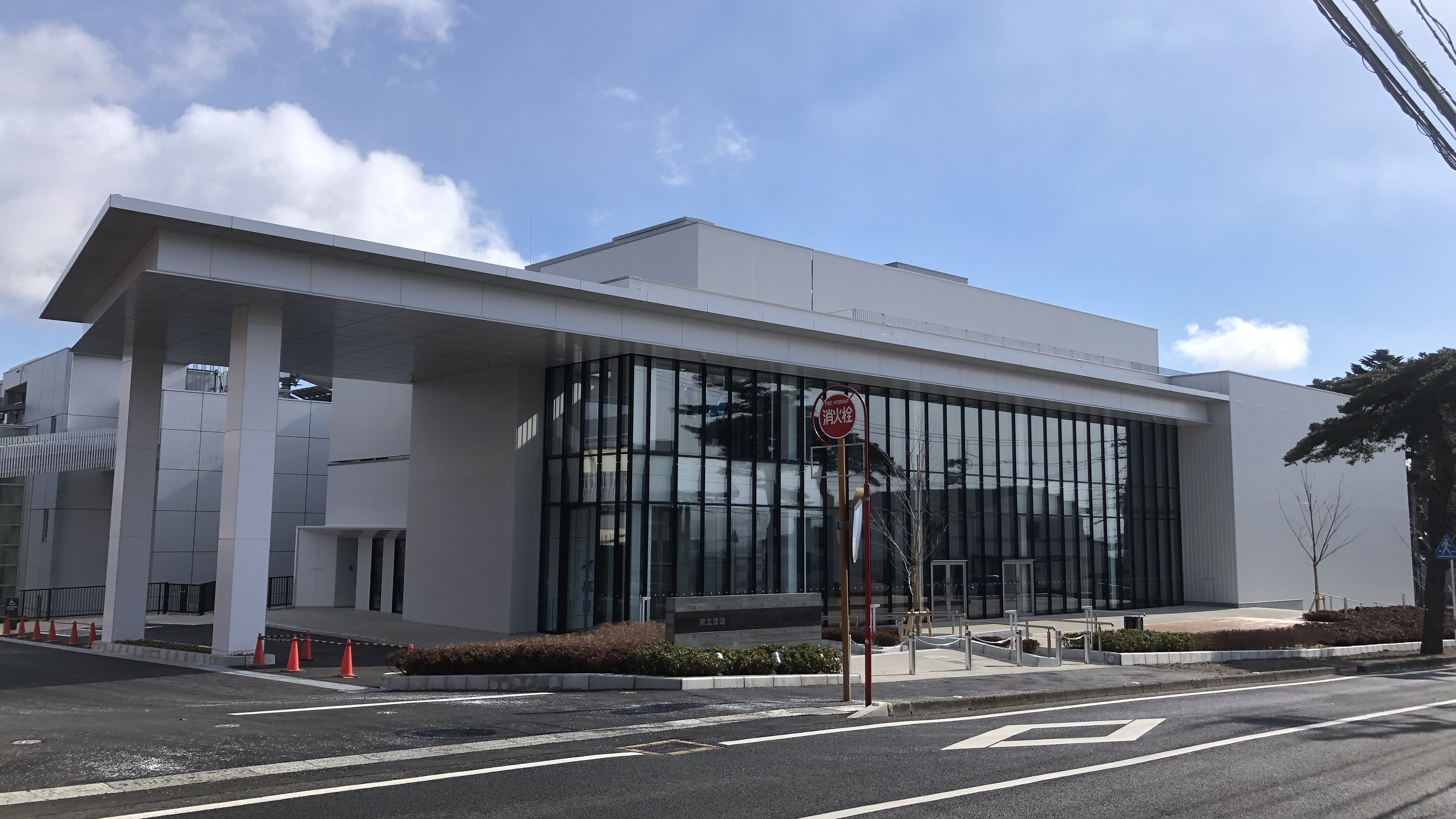
- Headquarters in Taihaku-ku, Sendai
- Trade name: tbc
- Native name: 東北放送株式会社
- Romanized name: Tōhōkuhōsō Kabushikigaisha
- Type: Private
- Industry: Radio and television network
- Founded: December 10, 1951; 74 years ago
- Headquarters: Taihaku-ku, Sendai, Miyagi Prefecture, Japan
- Key people: Atsuhiko Ichiriki (president and CEO)
- Subsidiaries: tbc Az
- Website: tbc-sendai.co.jp

JOIR
- Sendai; Japan
- Broadcast area: Miyagi Prefecture
- Frequencies: 1260 kHz (AM); 93.5 MHz (FM)
- Branding: tbc Radio

Programming
- Language: Japanese
- Format: Talk, Sports
- Affiliations: JRN/NRN

History
- First air date: May 1, 1952; 74 years ago
- Call sign meaning: JO I Radio

Technical information
- Licensing authority: MIC
- Power: 20kW

Links
- Website: www.tbc-sendai.co.jp/radio/

JOIR-DTV
- Miyagi Prefecture; Japan
- City: Sendai
- Channels: Digital: 19 (UHF); Virtual: 1
- Branding: tbc Television

Programming
- Language: Japanese
- Affiliations: Japan News Network

Ownership
- Owner: Tohoku Broadcasting Co., Ltd.

History
- First air date: April 1, 1959; 67 years ago
- Former call signs: JOIR-TV (1959-2012)
- Former channel numbers: 1 (analog VHF, 1959-2012)

Technical information
- Licensing authority: MIC

Links
- Website: www.tbc-sendai.co.jp/tv/

Tohoku Broadcasting Co., Ltd. (Japanese: 東北放送株式会社, Hepburn: Tōhōku Hōsō Kabushiki Gaisha; TBC) is a Japanese TV and radio network affiliated with the Japan News Network (JNN), Japan Radio Network (JRN) and National Radio Network (NRN). Its headquarters are located in Miyagi Prefecture, Tōhoku region.

Despite being one of the quasi-key JNN & JRN affiliates outside of the Five-Company Agreement Stations (TBS, HBC, CBC, MBS, RKB), Tohoku Broadcasting's radio division is a core NRN affiliate, in which the station has dedicated lines for NRN programming distribution, including baseball coverage for Tohoku Rakuten Golden Eagles. It is one of 3 JRN-affiliated stations who are core NRN stations. The other 2 being RCC and SBS.

== History ==
Tohoku Shimbun established "Kita Nippon Commercial Broadcasting Co., Ltd." in December 1947, which was the first attempt to establish a private radio station in northeastern Japan. However, the occupied government of the time didn't permit private broadcasters to begin operating, causing the plan to collapse. After the "Three Radio Laws" were passed in 1950, three companies in Miyagi Prefecture, Tohoku Shinpo, Tohoku Broadcasting and Sendai Municipal Broadcasting, applied to establish private radio stations. The latter three companies were integrated into "Radio Sendai Co., Ltd.", and the company name was changed to Sendai Broadcasting on February 22, 1951, and a preliminary license was obtained on April 21.

On December 10, Sendai Broadcasting officially registered as a company, but still used the name "Radio Sendai" when broadcasting. On April 5 of the following year, Sendai Radio began trial broadcasting. On May 1, Radio Sendai officially launched, becoming the first private radio station in the Tohoku region and the 11th private radio station in Japan. In January 1953, Sendai Broadcasting rebranded itself to Tohoku Broadcasting. In the same year, Northeast Broadcasting implemented stock dividends for the first time.

Northeast Broadcasting received its preliminary television license on November 22, 1957. In order to prepare for broadcasting television, Northeast Broadcasting began to build a television headquarters in 1958. On March 14, 1959, TBC began its pilot TV service. On April 1, TBC officially started broadcasting TV programs, becoming the first private TV station in Tohoku. Shortly after the broadcast, Tohoku Broadcasting participated in the broadcast of the wedding of Crown Prince Akihito and Masada Michiko. Tohoku Broadcasting joined JNN in the same year as the TV broadcast and was one of the founding members of JNN.

Second logo, used between 1962 and 1992

On the occasion of its 10th anniversary, Tohoku Broadcasting adopted a new logo designed by Yusaku Kamekura in 1962. The following year, Tohoku Broadcasting donated a fountain to the Sendai City Hall. Tohoku Broadcasting decided to build a new headquarters, Tohoku Broadcasting Hall, in Yagiyama in 1961. This building has 5 floors and is adjacent to the existing TV headquarters. The total floor area is 11,111 square meters. It was completed on May 6, 1963. Starting from August 1 of the same year, the Northeast Broadcasting Department began to operate in the Tohoku Broadcasting Hall.

TBC began broadcasting color TV on October 1, 1964, and was the first private TV station in Tohoku to start broadcasting color TV. Later, Tohoku Broadcasting realized full-color broadcast of the 1964 Tokyo Olympics. In 1967, on the occasion of the 15th anniversary of the launch of the station, Tohoku Broadcasting went to various parts of the West Coast of the United States to collect footage. It was the first overseas collection of materials since the launch. With the launch of Higashinippon Broadcasting in 1975, Miyagi Prefecture had gained four private television stations. In addition, it coincided with the Japanese economy transitioning from a period of rapid growth to a period of stable growth after the first oil crisis. TBC therefore faces more intense advertising competition. Although Tohoku Broadcasting's turnover continued to grow in the 1970s, its profits continued to decrease from 1973 to 1977. In this regard, Tohoku Broadcasting has developed non-advertising revenue by organizing large-scale events and other methods. In 1970, Tohoku Broadcasting held the TBC Housing Comprehensive Exhibition, covering the field of housing industry. From 1976 to 1981, Tohoku Broadcasting ranked first among the four private TV stations in Miyagi Prefecture in all-day and prime-time ratings. In 1980, Tohoku Broadcasting began broadcasting stereo TV programs.

Logo used between 1992 and 2019

Tohoku Broadcasting introduced a new logo in April 1992. In 2002, Tohoku Broadcasting obtained the weather forecast business license operator qualification from the Japan Meteorological Agency and was able to issue its own weather forecast. In 2004, Tohoku Broadcasting expanded its headquarters and opened the "B-site" building for television news. Sendai Broadcasting began broadcasting digital TV on December 1, 2005 at the same time as NHK Sendai Broadcasting Station, Sendai Television, and Miyagi TV. Affected by the Great East Japan Earthquake, Iwate, Miyagi, and Fukushima prefectures in the Tohoku region shut down analog TV later than in other parts of Japan, on March 31, 2012. TBC shut down its analog signal on that date. In January 2020, the new headquarters of Tohoku Broadcasting were completed. The building has 5 floors above ground and 1 floor underground, with a total floor area of 9,755 square meters. In May of the same year, the TBC Radio division began broadcasting from the new headquarters. The television division began broadcasting from the new headquarters in June. At the same time as moving into the new headquarters, Tohoku Broadcasting carried out a new corporate identity and launched a new logo.
