= RCC Broadcasting =

Radio and TV station in Hiroshima, Japan

RCC Broadcasting Co., Ltd.
- Logo used since 2022

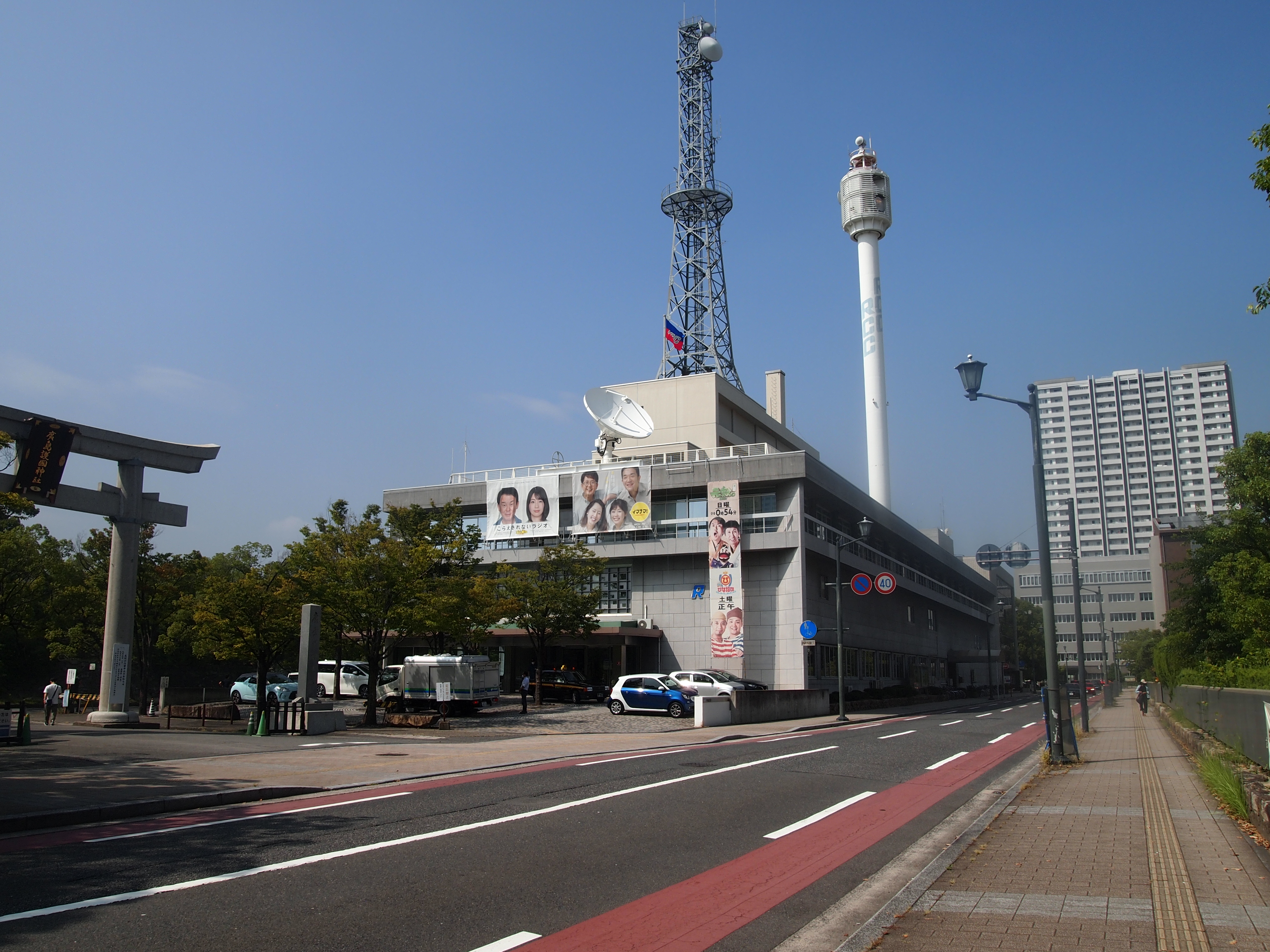
- Headquarters in Naka-ku, Hiroshima
- Native name: 株式会社中国放送
- Romanized name: Kabushiki-gaisha Chūgoku Hōsō
- Formerly: Hiroshima Broadcasting Corporation (May 7, 1952 – August 7, 1952); Radio Chugoku (August 8, 1952 – March 31, 1967)
- Type: Kabushiki gaisha
- Industry: Media
- Founded: May 7, 1952; 74 years ago
- Headquarters: 21-3 Motomachi, Naka-ku, Hiroshima, Hirosima Prefecture, Japan
- Key people: Yoshimi Miyasako (president and CEO)
- Number of employees: 183 (as of January 6, 2020)
- Website: rcc.jp

JOER
- Hiroshima; Japan
- Broadcast area: Hiroshima Prefecture
- Frequencies: 1350 kHz (AM); 94.6 MHz (FM)
- Branding: RCC Radio

Programming
- Language: Japanese
- Format: Talk, sports
- Affiliations: JRN/NRN

Ownership
- Owner: RCC Broadcasting Co., Ltd.

History
- First air date: October 1, 1952; 74 years ago

Technical information
- Licensing authority: MIC
- Power: 20,000 watts

Links
- Website: radio.rcc.jp

JOER-DTV JOEE-TV (defunct)
- Hiroshima Prefecture; Japan
- City: Hiroshima
- Channels: Digital: 18 (UHF); Virtual: 3
- Branding: RCC Television

Programming
- Affiliations: Japan News Network

Ownership
- Owner: RCC Broadcasting Co., Ltd.

History
- First air date: April 1, 1959; 67 years ago
- Last air date: July 24, 2011; 15 years ago (JOEE-TV)
- Former call signs: JOER-TV (1959–2011)
- Former channel numbers: Analog: 4 (VHF, 1959–2011); JOEE-TV: 10 (VHF, 1962–2011)
- Former affiliations: NTV (secondary; April 1, 1959 – August 31, 1962); Fuji TV (tertiary; April 1, 1959 – August 31, 1962); NET/ANN (quaternary; April 1, 1959 – September 30, 1975)

Technical information
- Licensing authority: MIC

Links
- Website: tv.rcc.jp

RCC Broadcasting Co., Ltd. (Note: Japanese: 株式会社中国放送, Hepburn: Kabushiki-gaisha Chūgoku Hōsō; RCC) is a Japanese broadcaster located in Hiroshima, Japan. It is an affiliate of radio networks JRN and NRN, and the television network JNN.

The station can be found at Marine Corps Air Station Iwakuni in eastern Yamaguchi prefecture, near the border of the Hiroshima prefecture. A subscription is not required to receive their broadcasts. Also, the reason behind this is that the said US air station doesn't carry the prefecture's JNN affiliate.

Despite being a quasi-key affiliate of JNN and JRN outside of the Five-Company Agreement Stations (TBS, HBC, CBC, MBS, RKB), RCC's radio division is a core NRN station, with dedicated lines that are responsible for transmitting NRN programming, including baseball coverages involving Hiroshima Toyo Carp. It is one of 3 JRN-affiliated stations who are core NRN stations, the other 2 being SBS & TBC.

== History ==
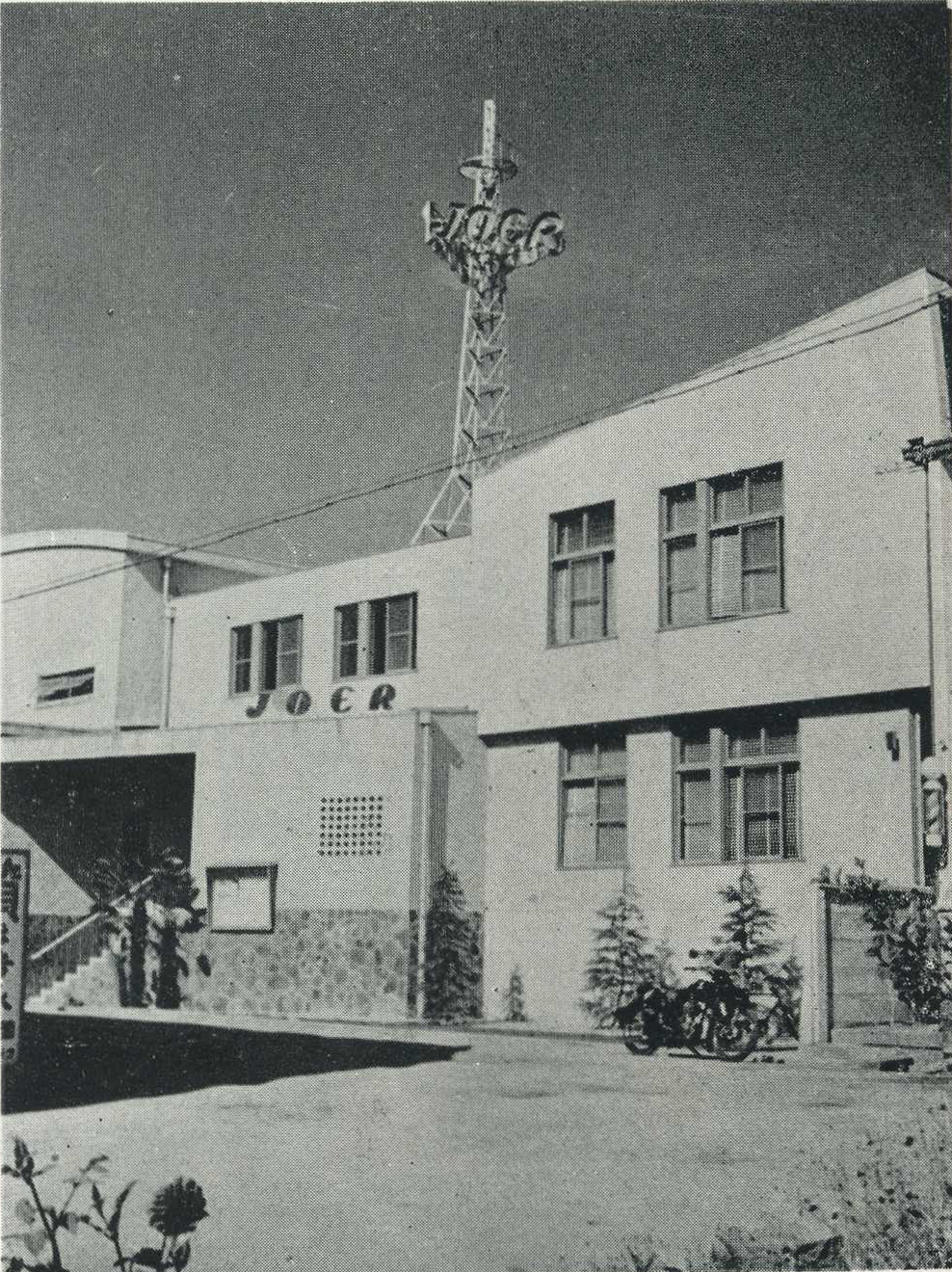
Radio Chugoku's first headquarters (pictured in 1955)

=== Early history ===
After the passage of the "Three Radio Laws" in 1950, plans to expand private broadcasting took place across Japan. Two companies, "Hiroshima Heiwa Broadcasting" and "Radio Hiroshima" applied for the establishment of private radio stations. Later, upon recommendation by the Radio Supervisory Committee, the two companies merged. On April 21, 1951, Hiroshima Broadcasting (the newly merged company) was granted a license to broadcast. On February 25, 1952, they held a promoters' meeting and received funding from newspapers Asahi Shimbun and Mainichi Shimbun.

On August 8, 1952, after a general meeting of shareholders, Hiroshima Broadcasting was renamed to Radio Chugoku, using RCC as an abbreviation for Radio Chugoku Company. Radio Chugoku started broadcasting on October 1, 1952, at 6:30 am, operating for at least 16 hours and 30 minutes every day.

=== Expansion to TV broadcasting and further developments ===
Previous logo, using 2021

Radio Chugoku applied for a TV license in 1954, and received a preliminary TV license on October 22, 1957. On March 17, 1959, Radio Chugoku began TV broadcast trials. By April 1, 1959, Radio Chugoku started TV broadcasts. Also in the same year, it joined the Japan News Network.

During its early operations, the broadcaster didn't have any professional TV studios, instead its radio studio was multipurposed for TV broadcasts. It was then decided that a new headquarters would be built in Motomachi (which started on November 5, 1960), adjacent to the Hiroshima Castle. On October 19, 1961, Radio Chugoku started broadcasting from its newly built headquarters.

On March 20, 1966, Chugoku Radio and Television began TV broadcasting in color. On April 1 of the same year, it started 24 hour TV broadcasts. The company was then renamed to Chugoku Broadcasting on April 1, 1967, to reflect its TV and radio operations. RCC continued to be used to refer to the company.

Since the mid-60s, RCC produced documentaries with foreign productions. These include a documentary about Japanese immigrants in Hawaii in 1965, and a documentary about Hiroshima City and Volgograd becoming sister cities in 1968.

On April 15, 1970, Nippon Professional Baseball opening day, RCC aired the first color Hiroshima Toyo Carp local game broadcasts for its broadcast markets. Chugoku Broadcasting became an official broadcaster for airing highlights of the Hiroshima Flower Festival since it started in 1977.

RCC began using digital broadcasts on October 1, 2006, and ended analog broadcasts on July 24, 2011, alongside that of JOEE-TV.
