= Nippon Broadcasting System =

Radio station in Tokyo, Japan

Coordinates: 35.675203°N 139.760646°E

JOLF
- Logo used since 1986

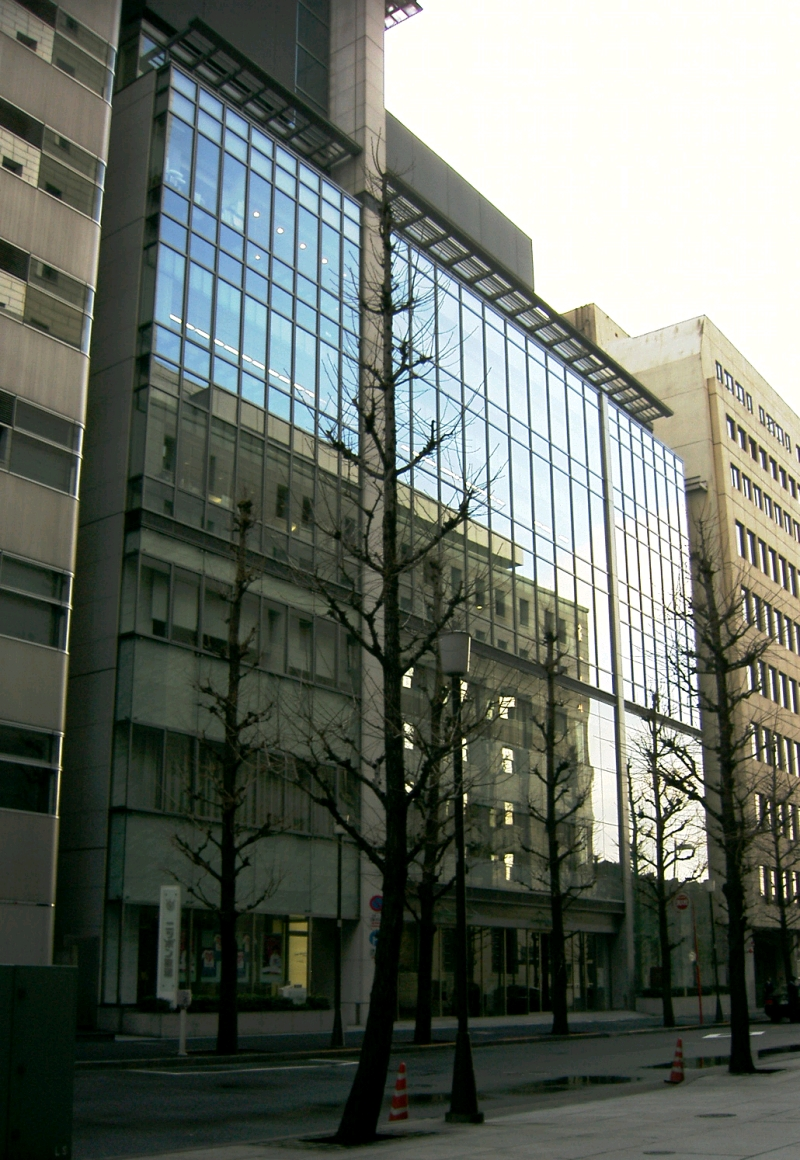
- Headquarters in Chiyoda, Tokyo
- Tokyo; Japan
- Broadcast area: Kanto region
- Frequencies: 1242 kHz (AM), 93.0 MHz (FM)
- Branding: AM Radio 1242 Nippon Hōsō (AMラジオ1242ニッポン放送, AM Rajio ichi ni yo ni Nippon Hōsō)

Programming
- Language: Japanese
- Format: Talk, Sports
- Affiliations: National Radio Network

History
- First air date: July 15, 1954; 72 years ago

Technical information
- Licensing authority: MIC
- Power: 100,000 watts (AM 1242 kHz); 7,000 watts (FM 93 MHz)
- ERP: 57,000 watts (FM 93 MHz)

Links
- Webcast: https://radiko.jp/#LFR (Japan only)
- Website: https://www.1242.com

Corporate information
- Native name: 株式会社ニッポン放送
- Romanized name: Kabushiki-gaisha Nippon Hōsō
- Type: Subsidiary KK
- Industry: Broadcasting
- Founded: April 1, 2006 (spun off from the former Nippon Broadcasting System, Inc. founded in 1954)
- Headquarters: 9-3, Yūrakuchō, Chiyoda, Tokyo, Japan
- Key people: Maki Hiwara (president and CEO)
- Number of employees: 121 (June 2021)
- Parent: Fuji Media Holdings
- Website: https://www.jolf.co.jp/

Nippon Broadcasting System, Inc. (Japanese: 株式会社ニッポン放送, Hepburn: Kabushiki-gaisha Nippon Hōsō; NBS, callsign JOLF), is a Japanese radio station based in Yurakucho, Chiyoda ward, Tokyo, headquartered near the Tokyo Imperial Palace. Along with Nippon Cultural Broadcasting, it is the flagship station of the National Radio Network. It is also the main company of the Nippon Broadcasting Group. Nippon Broadcasting System is a subsidiary of Fuji Media Holdings and both companies are affiliated with the Fujisankei Communications Group.

Reportedly the most listened-to radio station in the world in 1990, Nippon Broadcasting System was instrumental in the creation of several companies, including Fuji Television in 1957, Pony Canyon in 1966 and the Fujisankei Communications Group in 1967.

Nippon Broadcasting System is the home of the long-running radio program All Night Nippon.

== History ==
Current logo of Nippon Broadcasting System (Japanese: ニッポン放送), in use since 1986.

The radio station was founded in 1954. From July 15, 1954, to September 30, 1967, the station used the abbreviation "NBS", derived from Nippon Broadcasting System. Since October 1, 1967, it uses the call sign JOLF and identifies itself with the last two letters: "LF".

In 1990, Nippon Broadcasting System sued its rival Radio Nippon to prevent it from using both the "R · F · Radio Japan" and "Radio Japan" trademarks. Nippon Broadcasting System lost the lawsuit.

In 1992, Nippon Broadcasting System started broadcasting in C-QuAM stereo, continuing until March 31, 2024.

A labor union was formed at Nippon Broadcasting System for the first time on September 12, 2005.

Nippon Broadcasting System was historically the parent company of Fuji Television despite the latter being a much larger company than the former. Both companies were founded in the 1950s and were part of the Fujisankei Communications Group. In 2005, the relation between the two companies was reversed and Nippon Broadcasting System became the subsidiary of Fuji Television.

In April 2006, the radio broadcaster and its station license was spun off into a new separate company called "Nippon Broadcasting System" owned by Fuji Television. Fuji Television absorbed the rest of the old Nippon Broadcasting System company that was founded in 1954 and took over its assets. As a result, former subsidiaries of Nippon Broadcasting System such as Pony Canyon were transferred to Fuji Television, which was later renamed Fuji Media Holdings in 2008.
