= Nippon Television Network System =

Japanese television network

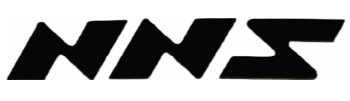
Logo

Nippon Television Network System (NNS; Japanese: 日本テレビネットワーク協議会, romanized: Nihon Terebi Nettowāku Kyōgikai) is a Japanese television network organized by Nippon Television (NTV), which is itself controlled by The Yomiuri Shimbun Holdings. NTV feeds entertainment and other non-news programming over NNS to 29 affiliated stations.

Distribution of national television news bulletins is handled by Nippon News Network, another network set up by NTV.

== Overview ==
NNS was created on June 14, 1972. All of the NNN-affiliated stations, excluding TV Miyazaki, are members. Eight of its stations (STV, SDT, MMT, CTV, YTV, HTV, FBS, NIB, KKT) are equity-method affiliates of the parent station NTV.
