= List of radio stations in Japan =

The list of radio stations in Japan lists all the national/regional radio stations in Japan.

Because of governmental regulation, Japan has a relatively small number of radio stations. Japan also has a comparatively smaller number of radio listeners nationwide than most other developed countries as well as countries in the geographic region. This is because of several factors, including the cultural difference in perception of radio, the fact that cars in Japan come with dashboard televisions fitted as standard, as well as general disinterest in the medium among working younger audiences compared with other mediums, especially television. Generally, each prefecture has two NHK stations, one commercial AM station (some are also on FM), and one commercial FM station. Heavily populated areas, such as Kantō region or Kansai region, have more stations.

There are also an increasing number of AM stations that start broadcasting on FM (on 90-95 MHz) as a supplement. The stations that air on the band are called Wide FM (ワイドFM) or FM complementary relay station (FM補完中継局).

The listed stations with ★ signs also broadcast television. Many stations have multiple frequencies (repeaters).

Certain AM-only radio stations (or AM stations with limited FM simulcast coverage) will be broadcasting solely in FM by 2028. The switch will not affect Hokkaido and Akita Prefectures and will continue AM-FM radio simulcasts. NHK is excluded from the switchover, as they have separate plans to consolidate its radio services.

Since 2024, commercial radio broadcasters have begun temporarily shutting down AM radio broadcasts, as a trial-run to FM-only broadcasts in 2028. Initially, at least 34 radio stations (which would start from February or July 2024 and end in 2025) will participate in this move, with additional broadcasters joining in the coming months.

== Networks ==
All networks are broadcast in Japanese, except MegaNet and AFN.

Public (NHK)		Commercial			Military
AM Radio	FM Radio	AM Radio	FM Radio		American Forces Network (Note: Broadcasts on TV and radio and programming are in English language. The network is not in Japanese registration and follows to FCC)
NHK AM	NHK-FM	Japan Radio Network (JRN)	Japan FM Network (JFN)	MegaNet (Note: Programs are mainly in Japanese and English)	American Forces Network
NHK AM		National Radio Network (NRN)	Japan FM League (JFL)		American Forces Network

=== Former ===
==== Educational ====
- Open University of Japan: FM, Satellite (radio closed down in October 2018)
  - JOUD-FM:
    - 77.1 MHz Tokyo
    - 78.8 MHz Maebashi

==== Public ====
- NHK Radio 1 (radio merged into NHK AM in March 2026)
- NHK Radio 2 (radio merged into NHK AM in March 2026)

== Hokkaidō ==
Prefecture		NHK		Commercial Broadcasting								
Prefecture		AM	FM	AM				FM				
Prefecture		AM	FM	JRN only	JRN + NRN	NRN only	Independent	JFN	JFL	MegaNet	Independent	Number of Community Radio stations
Hokkaido	Sapporo (Note: Includes the Ishikari Subprefecture, Shiribeshi Subprefecture, central and southern Sorachi Subprefecture)	★ NHK Sapporo (AM: 567 kHz, FM: 85.2 MHz)			★ Hokkaido Broadcasting (HBC) (JOHR; 1287 kHz, 91.5 MHz)	STV Radio (JOWF; 1440 kHz, 90.4 MHz)		FM Hokkaido (Note: Currently branded as Air-G) (JOFU-FM; 80.4 MHz)	FM North Wave (JOPV-FM; 82.5 MHz)			13
Hokkaido	Muroran (Note: Includes the Iburi Subprefecture and Hidaka Subprefecture)	★ NHK Muroran (AM: 945 kHz, FM: 88.0 MHz)			★ HBC Muroran (JOQF; 864 kHz)	STV Radio (JOWF; 1440 kHz, 90.4 MHz)		FM Hokkaido (JOFU-FM; 80.4 MHz)				2
Hokkaido	Hakodate (Note: Includes the Oshima Subprefecture and Hiyama Subprefecture)	★ NHK Hakodate (AM: 675 kHz, FM: 87.0 MHz)			★ HBC Hakodate (JOHO; 900 kHz)	STV Radio Hakodate (JOWN; 639 kHz)		FM Hokkaido (JOFU-FM; 80.4 MHz)	FM North Wave (JOPV-FM; 82.5 MHz)			1
Hokkaido	Asahikawa (Note: Includes the Kamikawa Subprefecture, northern Sorachi Subprefecture, Rumoi Subprefecture and Sōya Subprefecture)	★ NHK Asahikawa (AM: 621 kHz, FM: 85.8 MHz)			★ HBC Asahikawa (JOHE; 864 kHz)	STV Radio Asahikawa (JOWL; 1197 kHz)		FM Hokkaido (JOFU-FM; 80.4 MHz)	FM North Wave (JOPV-FM; 82.5 MHz)			5
Hokkaido	Obihiro (Note: Includes the Tokachi Subprefecture)	★ NHK Obihiro (AM: 603 kHz, FM: 87.5 MHz)			★ HBC Obihiro (JOHW; 1269 kHz)	STV Radio Obihiro (JOWM; 1071 kHz)		FM Hokkaido (JOFU-FM; 80.4 MHz)	FM North Wave (JOPV-FM; 82.5 MHz)			2
Hokkaido	Kushiro (Note: Includes the Kushiro Subprefecture and Nemuro Subprefecture)	★ NHK Kushiro (AM: 585 kHZ, FM: 88.5 MHz)			★ HBC Kushiro (JOQL;1404 kHz)	STV Radio Kushiro (JOWS; 882 kHz)		FM Hokkaido (JOFU-FM; 80.4 MHz)	FM North Wave (JOPV-FM; 82.5 MHz)			3
Hokkaido	Kitami - Abashiri (Note: Includes the Abashiri Subprefecture)	★ NHK Kitami (AM: 1188 kHZ, FM: 86.0 MHz)			★ HBC Abashiri (JOQM; 1449 kHz)	STV Radio Abashiri (JOVX; 909 kHz)		FM Hokkaido (JOFU-FM; 80.4 MHz)				2

== Tōhoku region ==
Prefecture	NHK		Commercial Broadcasting								
Prefecture	AM	FM	AM				FM				
Prefecture	AM	FM	JRN only	JRN + NRN	NRN only	Independent	JFN	JFL	MegaNet	Independent	Number of Community Radio stations
Aomori	★ NHK Aomori (AM: 963 kHz, FM: 86.0 MHz)			★ Aomori Broadcasting (RAB) (JOGR; 1233 kHz, 91.7 MHz)		AFN Misawa (AFN; 1575 kHz)	FM Aomori (JOWU-FM; 80.4 MHz)				4
Akita	★ NHK Akita (AM: 1503 kHz, FM: 86.7 MHz)			★ Akita Broadcasting (ABS) (JOTR; 936 kHz, 90.1 MHz)			FM Akita (JOPU-FM; 82.8 MHz)				4
Yamagata	★ NHK Yamagata (AM: 540 kHz, FM: 82.1 MHz)			★ Yamagata Broadcasting (YBC) (JOEF; 918 kHz)			FM Yamagata (JOEV-FM; 80.4 MHz)				3
Iwate	★ NHK Morioka (AM: 531 kHz, FM: 83.1 MHz)			★ IBC Iwate Broadcasting (JODF; 684 kHz, 90.6 MHz)			FM Iwate (JOQU-FM; 76.1 MHz)				5
Miyagi	★ NHK Sendai (AM: 891 kHz, FM: 82.5 MHz)			★ Tohoku Broadcasting (TBC) (JOIR; 1260 kHz, 93.5 MHz)			FM Sendai (JOJU-FM; 77.1 MHz)				7
Fukushima	★ NHK Fukushima (AM: 1323 kHz, FM: 85.3 MHz)			Radio Fukushima (JOWR;1458 kHz, 90.8 MHz)			FM Fukushima (JOTV-FM; 81.8 MHz)				6

== Kantō region ==
Prefecture	NHK		Commercial Broadcasting									
Prefecture	AM	FM	AM					FM				
Prefecture	AM	FM	JRN only	JRN + NRN	NRN only		Independent	JFN	JFL	MegaNet	Independent	Number of Community Radio stations
Tokyo	★ NHK Broadcasting Center (AM: 594 kHz)	★ NHK Broadcasting Center (82.5 MHz)	TBS Radio (JOKR; 954 kHz, 90.5 MHz)		Nippon Cultural Broadcasting (JOQR; 1134 kHz, 91.6 MHz); Nippon Broadcasting System (JOLF; 1242 kHz, 93.0 MHz)		AFN Tokyo (AFN; 810 kHz)	Tokyo FM Broadcasting (JOAU-FM; 80.0 MHz)	J-WAVE (JOAV-FM; 81.3 MHz)	InterFM897 (JODW-FM; 89.7 MHz)		11
Saitama	★ NHK Broadcasting Center (AM: 594 kHz)	★ NHK Saitama (85.1 MHz)	TBS Radio (JOKR; 954 kHz, 90.5 MHz)		Nippon Cultural Broadcasting (JOQR; 1134 kHz, 91.6 MHz); Nippon Broadcasting System (JOLF; 1242 kHz, 93.0 MHz)					InterFM897 (JODW-FM; 89.7 MHz)	FM Nack5 (JODV-FM; 79.5 MHz)	4
Kanagawa	★ NHK Broadcasting Center (AM: 594 kHz)	★ NHK Yokohama (81.9 MHz)	TBS Radio (JOKR; 954 kHz, 90.5 MHz)		Nippon Cultural Broadcasting (JOQR; 1134 kHz, 91.6 MHz); Nippon Broadcasting System (JOLF; 1242 kHz, 93.0 MHz)		Radio Nippon (JORF; 1422 kHz)			InterFM897 (JODW-FM; 89.7 MHz)	FM Yokohama (JOTU-FM; 84.7 MHz)	13
Chiba	★ NHK Broadcasting Center (AM: 594 kHz)	★ NHK Chiba (80.7 MHz)	TBS Radio (JOKR; 954 kHz, 90.5 MHz)		Nippon Cultural Broadcasting (JOQR; 1134 kHz, 91.6 MHz); Nippon Broadcasting System (JOLF; 1242 kHz, 93.0 MHz)					InterFM897 (JODW-FM; 89.7 MHz)	bayFM (JOGV-FM; 78.0 MHz)	4
Gunma	★ NHK Broadcasting Center (AM: 594 kHz)	★ NHK Maebashi (81.6 MHz)	TBS Radio (JOKR; 954 kHz, 90.5 MHz)		Nippon Cultural Broadcasting (JOQR; 1134 kHz, 91.6 MHz); Nippon Broadcasting System (JOLF; 1242 kHz, 93.0 MHz)			FM Gunma (JORU-FM; 86.3 MHz)		InterFM897 (JODW-FM; 89.7 MHz)		7
Ibaraki	★ NHK Broadcasting Center (AM: 594 kHz)	★ NHK Mito (83.2 MHz)	TBS Radio (JOKR; 954 kHz, 90.5 MHz)		Nippon Cultural Broadcasting (JOQR; 1134 kHz, 91.6 MHz); Nippon Broadcasting System (JOLF; 1242 kHz, 93.0 MHz)	Ibaraki Broadcasting System (JOYF; 1197 kHz, 94.6 MHz)				InterFM897 (JODW-FM; 89.7 MHz)		4
Tochigi	★ NHK Broadcasting Center (AM: 594 kHz)	★ NHK Utsunomiya (80.3 MHz)	TBS Radio (JOKR; 954 kHz, 90.5 MHz)		Nippon Cultural Broadcasting (JOQR; 1134 kHz, 91.6 MHz); Nippon Broadcasting System (JOLF; 1242 kHz, 93.0 MHz)	Tochigi Broadcasting (JOXF; 1530 kHz, 94.1 MHz)		FM Tochigi (JOSV-FM; 76.4 MHz)		InterFM897 (JODW-FM; 89.7 MHz)		4

== Chūbu region ==
Prefecture	NHK			Commercial Broadcasting								
Prefecture	AM		FM	AM				FM				
Prefecture	Radio 1	Radio 2	FM	JRN only	JRN + NRN	NRN only	Independent	JFN	JFL	MegaNet	Independent	Number of Community Radio stations
Hokuriku Region
Niigata	★ NHK Niigata (AM: 837 kHz, FM: 82.3 MHz)				★ Broadcasting System of Niigata (BSN) (JODR; 1116 kHz, 92.7 MHz)			FM Niigata (JOXU-FM; 77.5 MHz)			Niigata Kenmin FM (JOWV-FM; 79.0 MHz)	10
Toyama	★ NHK Toyama (AM: 648 kHz, FM: 81.5 MHz)				★ Kitanihon Broadcasting (KNB) (JOLR; 738 kHz, 90.2 MHz)			FM Toyama (JOOU-FM; 82.7 MHz)				5
Ishikawa	★ NHK Kanazawa (AM: 1224 kHz, FM: 82.2 MHz)				★ Hokuriku Broadcasting (MRO) (JOMR; 1107 kHz, 94.0 MHz)			FM Ishikawa (JOHV-FM; 80.5 MHz)				5
Fukui	★ NHK Fukui (AM: 927 kHz, FM: 83.4 MHz)				★ Fukui Broadcasting (FBC) (JOPR; 864 kHz, 94.6 MHz)			FM Fukui (JOLU-FM; 76.1 MHz)				3
Shin'etsu Region
Nagano	★ NHK Nagano (AM: 819 kHz, FM: 84.0 MHz)				★ Shin'etsu Broadcasting (SBC) (JOSR; 1098 kHz, 92.2 MHz)			FM Nagano (JOZU-FM; 79.7 MHz)				6
Yamanashi	★ NHK Kofu (AM: 927 kHz, FM: 85.6 MHz)				★ Yamanashi Broadcasting (YBS) (JOJF; 765 kHz, 90.9 MHz)						FM Fuji (JOCV-FM; 83.0 MHz)	2
Shizuoka	★ NHK Shizuoka (AM: 882 kHz, FM: 88.8 MHz)				★ Shizuoka Broadcasting (SBS) (JOVR; 1404 kHz, 93.9 MHz)			FM Shizuoka (JOKU-FM; 79.2 MHz)				9
Tōkai Region
Aichi	★ NHK Nagoya (729 kHz)		★ NHK Nagoya (82.5 MHz)	CBC Radio (JOAR; 1053 kHz, 93.7 MHz)		Tokai Radio (JOSF; 1332 kHz, 92.9 MHz)		FM Aichi (JOCU-FM; 80.7 MHz)	Zip-FM (JOQV-FM; 77.8 MHz)	RadioNEO (JOCW-FM; 79.5 MHz)		8
Gifu	★ NHK Nagoya (729 kHz)		★ NHK Gifu (83.6 MHz)	CBC Radio (JOAR; 1053 kHz, 93.7 MHz)		Tokai Radio (JOSF; 1332 kHz, 92.9 MHz)	★ Gifu Broadcasting (GBS) (JOZF; 1431 kHz)	Radio80 (JOXV-FM; 80.0 MHz)				4
Mie (Note: Mie Prefecture is designated under Kansai Region, but actually part of Tokai Region as broadcasters follow the designated regional forecast grouping set by the Japan Meteorological Agency)	★ NHK Nagoya (729 kHz)		★ NHK Tsu (83.6 MHz)	CBC Radio (JOAR; 1053 kHz, 93.7 MHz)		Tokai Radio (JOSF; 1332 kHz, 92.9 MHz)		Radio80 (JOXV-FM; 78.9 MHz)				3

== Kansai region ==
Prefecture	NHK			Commercial Broadcasting											
Prefecture	AM		FM	AM						FM					
Prefecture	AM		FM	JRN only	JRN + NRN		NRN only		Independent	JFN	JFL	MegaNet	Independent	Number of Community Radio stations	
Osaka	★ NHK Osaka (666 kHz)		★ NHK Osaka (88.1 MHz)		ABC Radio (JONR; 1008 kHz, 93.3 MHz); MBS Radio (JOOR; 1179 kHz, 90.6 MHz)		Osaka Broadcasting Corporation (JOUF; 1314 kHz, 91.9 MHz)			FM Osaka (JOBU-FM; 85.1 MHz)	FM802 (JOAV-FM; 80.2 MHz)	FM Cocolo (JOAW-FM; 76.5 MHz)		9	
Hyogo	★ NHK Osaka (666 kHz)		★ NHK Kobe (86.5 MHz)		ABC Radio (JONR; 1008 kHz, 93.3 MHz); MBS Radio (JOOR; 1179 kHz, 90.6 MHz)		Osaka Broadcasting Corporation (JOUF; 1314 kHz, 91.9 MHz)		Radio Kansai (JOCR; 558 kHz)	FM Hyogo (JOIV-FM; 89.9 MHz)		FM Cocolo (JOAW-FM; 76.5 MHz)		11	
Nara	★ NHK Osaka (666 kHz)		★ NHK Nara (87.4 MHz)		ABC Radio (JONR; 1008 kHz, 93.3 MHz); MBS Radio (JOOR; 1179 kHz, 90.6 MHz)		Osaka Broadcasting Corporation (JOUF; 1314 kHz, 91.9 MHz)					FM Cocolo (JOAW-FM; 76.5 MHz)		2	
Kyoto	★ NHK Kyoto (621 kHz)	★ NHK Osaka (666 kHz)	★ NHK Kyoto (82.8 MHz)		ABC Radio (JONR; 1008 kHz, 93.3 MHz); MBS Radio (JOOR; 1179 kHz, 90.6 MHz)		Osaka Broadcasting Corporation (JOUF; 1314 kHz, 91.9 MHz)	Kyoto Broadcasting (JOBR; 1143 kHz)				FM Cocolo (JOAW-FM; 76.5 MHz)		FM Kyoto (JOKV-FM; 89.4 MHz)	6
Shiga	★ NHK Otsu (945 kHz)	★ NHK Osaka (666 kHz)	★ NHK Otsu (84.0 MHz)		ABC Radio (JONR; 1008 kHz, 93.3 MHz); MBS Radio (JOOR; 1179 kHz, 90.6 MHz)		Osaka Broadcasting Corporation (JOUF; 1314 kHz, 91.9 MHz)	KBS Shiga (JOBW; 1215 kHz)				FM Cocolo (JOAW-FM; 76.5 MHz)		FM Shiga (JOUV-FM; 77.0 MHz)	3
Wakayama	★ NHK Osaka (666 kHz)	★ NHK Osaka (666 kHz)	★ NHK Wakayama (84.7 MHz)		ABC Radio (JONR; 1008 kHz, 93.3 MHz); MBS Radio (JOOR; 1179 kHz, 90.6 MHz)	Wakayama Broadcasting (JOVF; 1431 kHz, 94.2 MHz)	Osaka Broadcasting Corporation (JOUF; 1314 kHz, 91.9 MHz)					FM Cocolo (JOAW-FM; 76.5 MHz)			4

== Chūgoku & Shikoku Region ==
Prefecture	NHK		Commercial Broadcasting								
Prefecture	AM	FM	AM				FM				
Prefecture	AM	FM	JRN only	JRN + NRN	NRN only	Independent	JFN	JFL	MegaNet	Independent	Number of Community Radio stations
Chugoku Region
Shimane	★ NHK Matsue (AM: 1296 kHz, FM: 84.5 MHz)			★ Broadcasting System of San-in (BSS) (JOHF; 900 kHz, 92.2 MHz)			FM San-in (JOVU-FM; 77.4 MHz)				1
Tottori	★ NHK Tottori (AM: 1368 kHz, FM: 85.8 MHz)			★ Broadcasting System of San-in (BSS) (JOHF; 900 kHz, 92.2 MHz)			FM San-in (JOVU-FM; 77.4 MHz)				2
Hiroshima	★ NHK Hiroshima (AM: 1071 kHz, FM: 88.3 MHz)			★ RCC Chugoku Broadcasting (JOER; 1350 kHz, 94.6 MHz)			FM Hiroshima (JOGU-FM; 78.2 MHz)				6
Yamaguchi	★ NHK Yamaguchi (AM: 675 kHz, FM: 85.3 MHz)			★ Yamaguchi Broadcasting (KRY) (JOPF; 765 kHz, 92.3 MHz)		AFN Iwakuni (AFN; 1575 kHz)	FM Yamaguchi (JOUU-FM; 79.2 MHz)				7
Okayama	★ NHK Okayama (AM: 603 kHz, FM: 88.7 MHz)			★ RSK Sanyo Broadcasting (JOYK; 1494 kHz, 91.4 MHz)			FM Okayama (JOVV-FM; 76.8 MHz)				5
Shikoku Region
Kagawa	★ NHK Takamatsu (AM: 1368 kHz, FM: 86.0 MHz)			★ Nishinippon Broadcasting (RNC) (JOKF; 1449 kHz, 90.3 MHz)			FM Kagawa (JOYU-FM; 78.6 MHz)				2
Ehime	★ NHK Matsuyama (AM: 963 kHz, FM: 87.7 MHz)			★ Nankai Broadcasting (RNB) (JOAF; 1116 kHz, 91.7 MHz)			FM Ehime (JOEU-FM; 79.7 MHz)				2
Kochi	★ NHK Kochi (AM: 990 kHz, FM: 87.5 MHz)			★ Kochi Broadcasting (RKC) (JOZR; 900 kHz, 90.8 MHz)			FM Kochi (JOLV-FM; 81.6 MHz)				1
Tokushima	★ NHK Tokushima (945 kHz)	★ NHK Tokushima (83.4 MHz)		★ Shikoku Broadcasting (JRT) (JOJR; 1269 kHz, 93.0 MHz)			FM Tokushima (JOMV-FM; 80.7 MHz)				1

== Kyūshū region ==
Prefecture		NHK		Commercial Broadcasting								
Prefecture		AM	FM	AM				FM				
Prefecture		AM	FM	JRN only	JRN + NRN	NRN only	Independent	JFN	JFL	MegaNet	Independent	Number of Community Radio stations
Fukuoka	Fukuoka	★ NHK Fukuoka (AM: 612 kHz, FM: 84.8 MHz)		★ RKB Mainichi Broadcasting (JOFR; 1278 kHz, 92.2 MHz)		★ Kyushu Asahi Broadcasting (KBC) (JOIF; 1413 kHz, 90.2 MHz)		FM Fukuoka (JODU-FM; 80.7 MHz)	Cross FM (JORV-FM; 78.7 MHz)	Love FM (JOFW-FM; 76.1 MHz)		2
Fukuoka	Kitakyushu	★ NHK Kitakyushu (AM: 540 kHz, FM: 85.7 MHz)		★ RKB Mainichi Broadcasting (JOFR; 1278 kHz, 92.2 MHz)		★ Kyushu Asahi Broadcasting (KBC) (JOIF; 1413 kHz, 90.2 MHz)		FM Fukuoka (JODU-FM; 80.7 MHz)	Cross FM (JORV-FM; 78.7 MHz)	Love FM (JOFW-FM; 76.1 MHz)		3
Saga		★ NHK Saga (963 kHz)	★ NHK Saga (81.6 MHz)		★ NBC Saga (JOUO; 1458 kHz, 93.5 MHz)			FM Saga (JONV-FM; 77.9 MHz)				2
Nagasaki		★ NHK Nagasaki (AM: 684 kHz, FM: 84.5 MHz)			★ Nagasaki Broadcasting (NBC) (JOUR; 1233 kHz, 92.6 MHz)		AFN Sasebo (AFN; 1575 kHz)	FM Nagasaki (JOHU-FM; 79.5 MHz)				6
Oita		★ NHK Oita (AM: 639 kHz, FM: 88.9 MHz)			★ Oita Broadcasting (OBS) (JOGF; 1098 kHz, 93.3 MHz)			FM Oita (JOJV-FM; 88.0 MHz)				7
Kumamoto		★ NHK Kumamoto (AM: 756 kHz, FM: 85.4 MHz)			★ Kumamoto Broadcasting (RKK) (JOBF; 1197 kHz, 91.4 MHz)			FM Kumamoto (JOSU-FM; 77.4 MHz)				5
Miyazaki		★ NHK Miyazaki (AM: 540 kHz, FM: 88.1 MHz)			★ Miyazaki Broadcasting (mrt) (JONF; 936 kHz, 84.9 MHz)			FM Miyazaki (JOMU-FM; 83.2 MHz)				3
Kagoshima		★ NHK Kagoshima (AM: 576 kHz, FM: 85.6 MHz)			★ Minaminihon Broadcasting (MBC) (JOCF; 1107 kHz, 92.8 MHz)			FM Kagoshima (JOOV-FM; 79.8 MHz)				9
Okinawa		★ NHK Okinawa (AM: 549 kHz, FM: 88.1 MHz)		★ Ryukyu Broadcasting (RBC) (JORR; 738 kHz, 92.1 MHz)		Radio Okinawa (JOXR; 864 kHz, 93.1 MHz)	AFN Okinawa (AFN; 648 kHz, 89.1 MHz)	FM Okinawa (JOIU-FM; 87.3 MHz)				15

== Nationwide stations ==
Some stations have multiple channels.

=== Shortwave ===
- Nikkei Radio Broadcasting Corporation (Radio Nikkei, 2 channels)
  - Radio Nikkei 1: 3.925 MHz SW, 6.055 MHz SW and 9.595 MHz SW
  - Radio Nikkei 2: 3.945 MHz SW, 6.115 MHz SW and 9.76 MHz SW

=== Satellite broadcasting ===
Certain satellite providers distribute radio channels that are tailored to every musical genres such as from SKY PerfecTV! and Usen (Music AirBee! and Sound Planet). In the education field, the Open University of Japan broadcast educational programming only on satellite TV (radio broadcasts and free-to-air TV broadcasts ended since October 2018).

== Community FM stations ==
Since January 10, 1992, the Ministry of Internal Affairs and Communications started accepting applications for community FM licenses which are allowed on municipal level. Currently, as of April 2021, there are roughly 335 community FM stations across Japan.

Community FM stations with English articles include:

Kanagawa Prefecture

- Zushi Hayama Community Broadcasting (Shōnan Beach FM): Hayama and Zushi, 78.9 MHz FM

Shizuoka Prefecture

- Hamamatsu FM Broadcasting Company JOZZ6AB-FM (FM Haro!): Hamamatsu, 76.1 MHz FM

Aichi Prefecture

- FM Toyohashi JOZZ6AA-FM: Toyohashi, 84.3 MHz FM

Hiroshima Prefecture

- Chūgoku Communication Network JOZZ8AG-FM (Hiroshima P-Station): Hiroshima, 76.6 MHz FM
- FM Fukuyama JOZZ8AA-FM (Radio Bingo): Fukuyama, 77.7 MHz FM
- Onomichi FM Broadcasting Company JOZZ8AF-FM (FM Onomichi): Onomichi, 79.4 MHz FM

== Others ==
- Highway advisory radio: 1620 kHz AM
- Roadside Station radio: 1629 kHz AM
