= Nagasaki (disambiguation) =

Nagasaki is the capital city of Nagasaki Prefecture in Japan.

Nagasaki may also refer to:

- Nagasaki Prefecture, Japan
- Atomic bombings of Hiroshima and Nagasaki during World War II
- Nagasaki (surname), a Japanese surname
- "Nagasaki" (song), a 1928 jazz song by Harry Warren and Mort Dixon
- Nagasaki (Schnittke), an oratorio composed by Alfred Schnittke
- Nagasaki: Memories of My Son, a 2015 Japanese film
- 5790 Nagasaki, a main-belt asteroid
- NHK Nagasaki Broadcasting Station
- Nagasaki Broadcasting, a radio and television broadcaster in Nagasaki Prefecture, Japan
- Nagasaki Culture Telecasting, a television station in Nagasaki Prefecture, Japan
- Nagasaki International Broadcasting, a television station in Nagasaki Prefecture, Japan
- Nagasaki Television, a television station in Nagasaki Prefecture, Japan
- FM Nagasaki, a radio station in Nagasaki Prefecture, Japan

== See also ==
- Kendo Nagasaki, a professional wrestling stage name
