= 76.1 FM =

FM radio frequency

The following radio stations broadcast on FM frequency 76.1 MHz:

== Brazil ==
- JC FM in Recife

== Japan ==
- JOFW-FM, Fukuoka, Kyushu
- JOZZ6AB-FM, Hamamatsu, Shizuoka
