= Date FM =

Radio station in Miyagi Prefecture, Japan

JOJU-FM
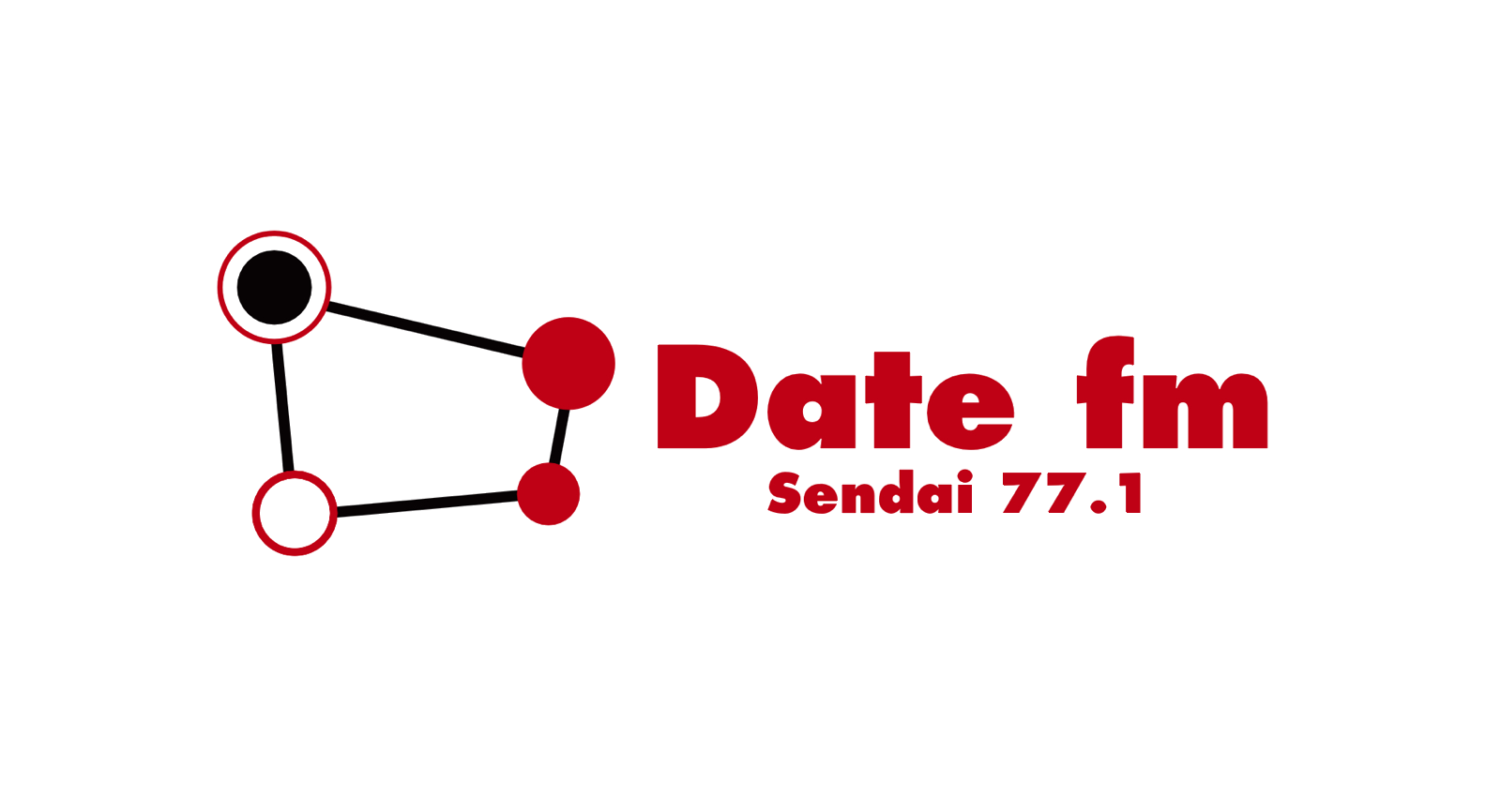
- Sendai; Japan
- Broadcast area: Miyagi Prefecture
- Frequency: 77.1 MHz
- Branding: Date FM

Programming
- Language: Japanese
- Format: Full Service, J-Pop
- Affiliations: Japan FM Network

Ownership
- Owner: Sendai FM Broadcasting Inc.

History
- First air date: December 1, 1982

Technical information
- Licensing authority: MIC
- Power: 1 kilowatt (Sendai)

Links
- Website: https://www.datefm.co.jp

FM Sendai (エフエム仙台), branded as Date FM (stylized Date fm) is an FM radio station in Sendai, Miyagi Prefecture, Japan. The station is a Japan FM Network affiliate. Prior to adopting the current brand name in 1997, the station was abbreviated FMS. FM Saga currently uses the abbreviation.

== Capital composition ==
As of 2015:

| Capital | Total number of shares | Number of shareholders |
|---|---|---|
| 480 million yen | 8,850 shares | 37 |

| Shareholder | Number of shares | Percentage |
|---|---|---|
| FM Tokyo | 1,050 shares | 10.5% |
| First Agency | 1,050 shares | 10.5% |
| Kahoku Shimpo Printing Company | 1,000 shares | 10.0% |
| Fuji Media Holdings | 800 shares | 8.0% |
| Daiwa Securities Group | 700 shares | 7.0% |
| Motohisa Tada | 550 shares | 5.5% |
| Yomiuri Shimbun (Tokyo Headquarters) | 550 shares | 5.5% |
| Asahi Shimbun Publishing Company | 550 shares | 5.5% |

== History ==
JOJU-FM was the eighth commercial radio station in Japan to begin operations, being registered in 1982 and commencing transmissions on December 1 of that year. Since its launch, the station produced a high volume of local programming, including formats that remained long after its founding.

In 1997, for its fifteenth anniversary, the station solicited suggestions for a new nickname for the station. The name "Date" was chosen, having a double meaning: that of the Date Domain and the English word "date", as in "up-to-date". The name FM Sendai is still used as its corporate name. Tokyo FM, one of its shareholders, still refers to the station under its corporate name FM Sendai.

In the aftermath of the 2011 Tōhoku earthquake and tsunami, the six JFN stations in the region, as well as Tokyo FM, started broadcasting on the LISMO WAVE service, valid from March 15, through April 30. On September 29, 2016, the station started streaming on Radiko for free in Miyagi, and nationwide in its Radiko Premium plan.
