= Hyogo FM Broadcasting =

Kiss FM KOBE (JOIV-FM)
- Kobe, Hyogo Prefecture; Japan
- Broadcast area: Kobe
- Frequency: 89.9 MHz

Programming
- Format: Top 40 Mainstream
- Affiliations: JFN

Ownership
- Owner: (As of October 1, 2014) SRC (43.52%) Tokyo FM (19.23%) Nippon Television City Corp. (19.23%); (Hyogo FM Broadcasting)

History
- First air date: October 1, 1990

Technical information
- ERP: 3.7 kilowatts
- HAAT: 698.6 meters
- Transmitter coordinates: 34°44′00.3″N 135°12′14.2″E

Links
- Webcast: Radiko.jp/#FMT
- Website: Tokyo FM Web site

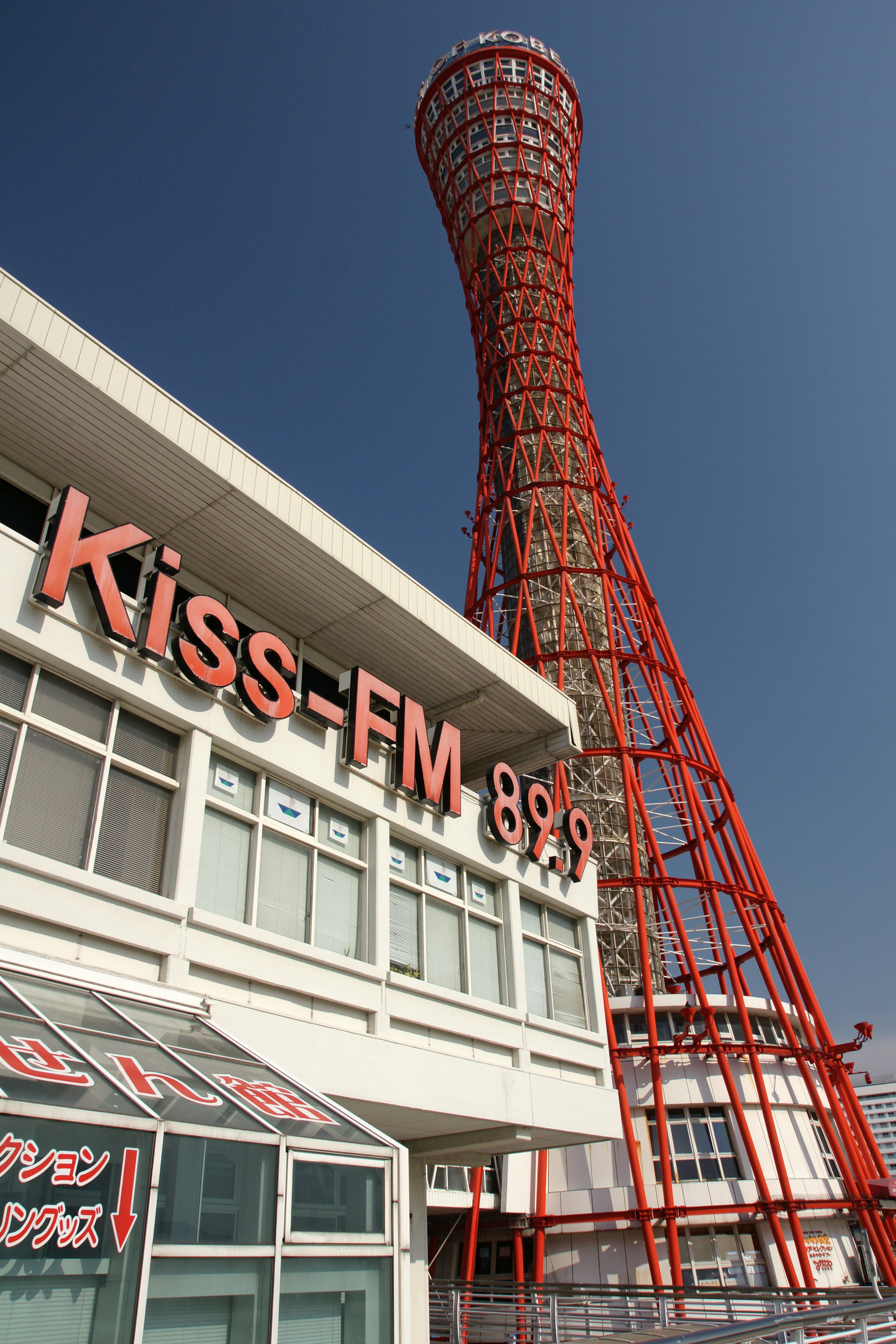
Headquarters in Kobe

Hyogo FM Broadcasting Co. Ltd. (DBA Kiss-FM KOBE.Co.Ltd) is an FM radio station in Kobe, Hyogo, Japan.

== Overview ==
The station was first launched on the same day as FM Oita (Air-Radio FM88, Oita Prefecture) in October, 1990. At conception, it was called Hyogo FM radiobroadcast (兵庫エフエムラジオ放送, Hyōgo Efuemu Rajio Hōsō). It was an independent station until it joined JFN on April 1, 2003.

Its main broadcast frequency is at 89.9 MHz, with an output of 1 kW and transmits from the Mount Rokko range. Reception is possible for most of the Kansai area.

There was a satellite studio, now closed, in the America Mura of Osaka.

== Program ==
- Shakariki
- Joy Tune Radio
- BEAT IT
- ENERGY FRIDAY!!!
- Viva la radio
- Kawakin

== See also ==
- List of radio stations in Japan
