= FM Ehime =

Radio station in Ehime Prefecture, Japan

JOEU-FM
- Matsuyama; Japan
- Broadcast area: Ehime Prefecture
- Frequency: 79.7 MHz
- Branding: FM Ehime

Programming
- Language: Japanese
- Format: Full Service, J-Pop
- Affiliations: Japan FM Network

Ownership
- Owner: FM Ehime Broadcasting Co.

History
- First air date: February 1, 1982

Technical information
- Licensing authority: MIC
- Power: 1 kilowatt (Matsuyama)

Links
- Website: http://www.joeufm.co.jp

FM Ehime (エフエム愛媛) is an FM radio station in Ehime, Japan. The station is an affiliate of the Japan FM Network (JFN). It started broadcasting on February 1, 1982, becoming the fifth commercial FM station in Japan, the first since 1970 and the first located outside of a larger city.

The station is reportedly the largest FM station in Shikoku; as of the end of fiscal 2021, the station's audience was estimated to be between 50,000 and 100,000 listeners.

== Capital composition ==
As of 2015:

Capital	Total number of shares	Number of shareholders
500 million yen	1,000,000 shares	42

Shareholder	Number of shares	Percentage
Ehime Government	100,000 shares	10.00%
Ehime Broadcasting	100,000 shares	10.00%
Yomiuri Shimbun Osaka Headquarters	79,000 shares	7.90%
Junji Hino	65,500 shares	6.55%
Ehime Shimbun Printing Company	64,000 shares	6.40%
Fuji Media Holdings	53,000 shares	5.30%
Asahi Shimbun	50,000 shares	5.00%
Shiraichi Toitsu	48,000 shares	4.80%
Matsuyama City Government	40,000 shares	4.00%
Nankai Broadcasting	40,000 shares	4.00%
Nikkei, Inc.	40,000 shares	4.00%
Iyo Bank	40,000 shares	4.00%
Ehime Bank	40,000 shares	4.00%
National Mutual Insurance Federation of Agricultural Cooperatives (Ehime Headquarters)	40,000 shares	4.00%
Ehime Prefectural Credit Agricultural Cooperative Federation	40,000 shares	4.00%

== History ==
FM Ehime was registered in 1981, a move that was seen with concern from Nankai Broadcasting, as it feared a loss of listeners owing to the station's opening. On February 1, 1982, JOEU-FM started broadcasting on 79.9 in Matsuyama; up until April 9, it had set up its relay stations at Niihama, Yawatahama and Uwajima.

On the week starting December 16, 2002, FM Ehime took part in a joint listener survey for the first time, which was shared by RNB and issued by Video Research.

In June 2018, the company opened its online store, FM Marche, to sell products typical of the prefecture and Shikoku for a national audience, in order to boost revenue.
