= Akita Sakigake Shimpō =

Coordinates: 39°43′05.8″N 140°5′17.1″E

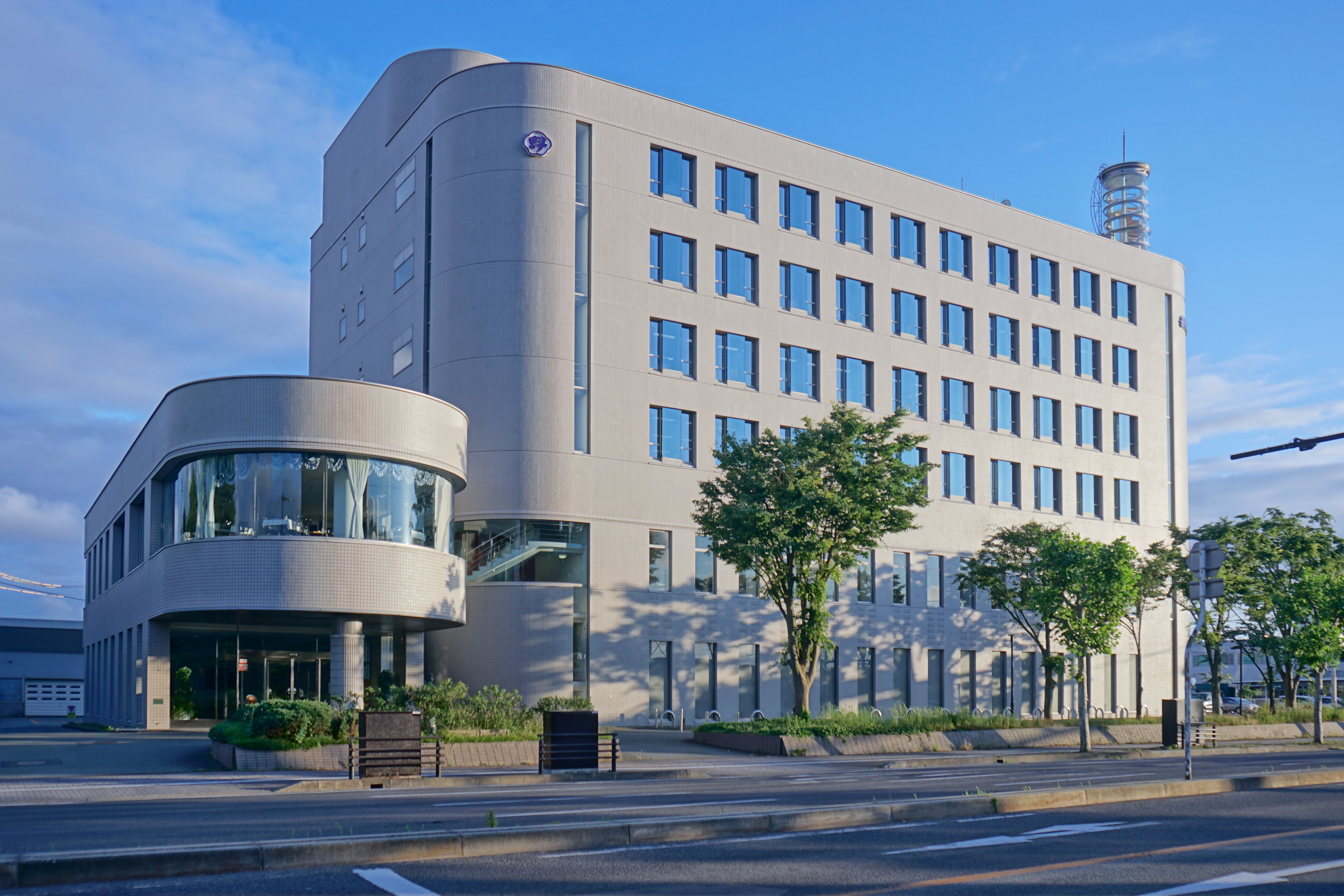
- Headquarters
- Type: Daily newspaper
- Format: Broadsheet
- Staff writers: 270
- Founded: 1873
- Language: Japanese
- Headquarters: Sanno Rinkaimachi, Akita, Akita Japan
- Circulation: 227,274 (2018)
- Website: www.sakigake.jp

Akita Sakigake Shimpo (秋田魁新報, Akita Sakigake Shimpō) is a Japanese daily newspaper published mainly in Akita prefecture. The company is based in Akita, Akita. The newspaper is dominant in its region, with a market penetration approaching 54 percent of Akita Prefecture households.

== History ==
The Ugo Shimbun was established on March 28, 1873, in Akita and was founded by its editor, Ryochi Karino. In August, the newspaper changed its name to Kaji Shimbun. From October 2008, the evening edition was discontinued.

== Sakigake Group affiliate companies ==
- Akita Broadcasting System (10%)
- Akita Television (6.41%)
- FM Akita (24.66%)
