= Fukui FM Broadcasting =

Radio station in Fukui, Japan

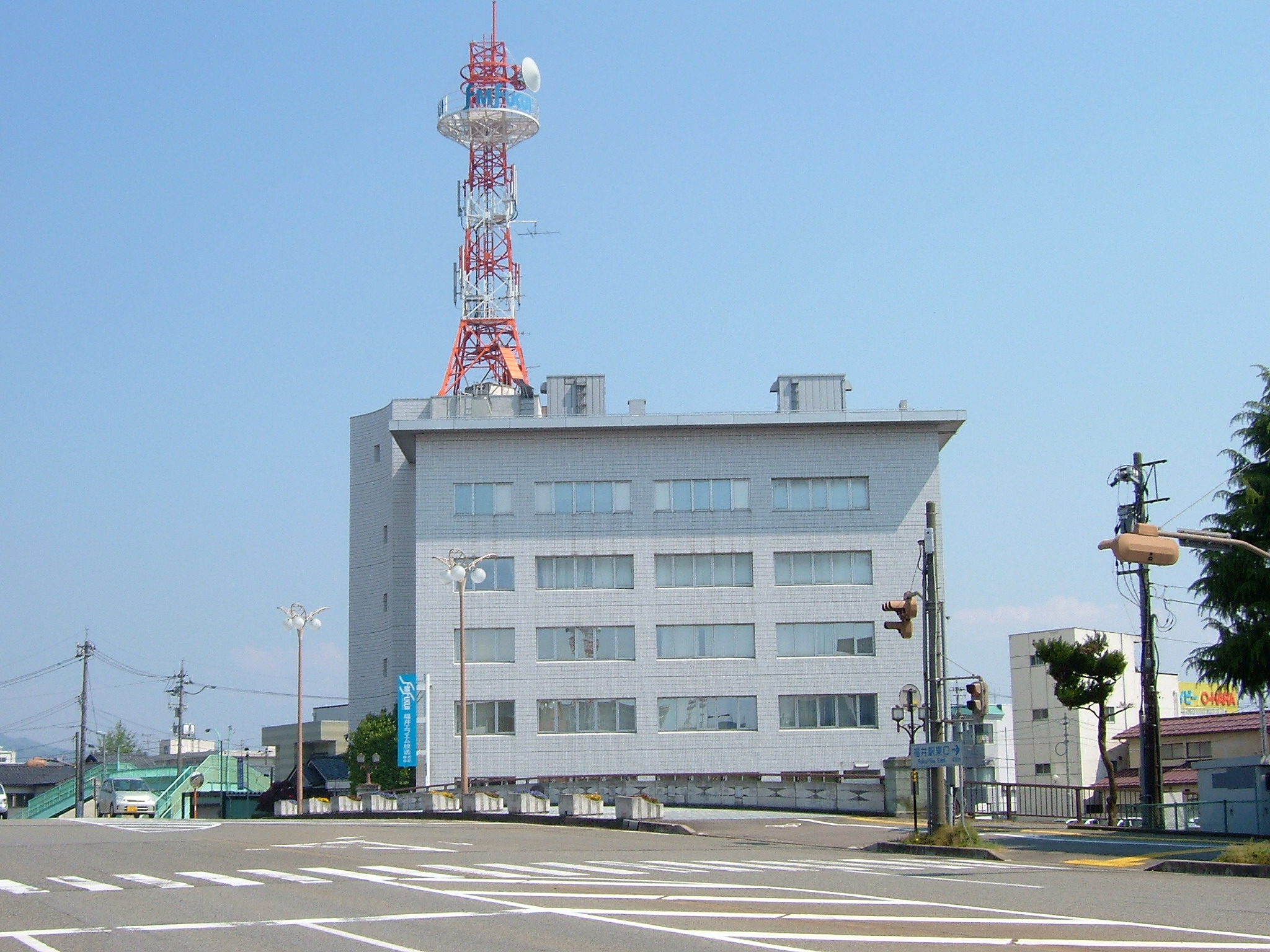
Headquarters

Fukui FM Broadcasting Co., Ltd. (福井エフエム放送株式会社, Fukui Efu Emu Hōsō Kabushiki gaisha, literally FM FUKUI) is a radio station in Fukui, Fukui, Japan. It is the flagship station of the Japan FM Network (JFN).

== Timeline ==
This broadcasting station acquired a preliminary radio license on December 19, 1983, and was established as Fukui FM Broadcasting Co., Ltd. on February 20, 1984. The radio was launched on December 18 of that year. FM teletext broadcasting ended on March 31, 2014.

== Broadcasting ==
The callsign for this station is JOLU-FM. The frequency of this station is 76.1 MHz. And the power of this broadcasting station is 1 kW, and the ERP is 4.4 kW. There are six relay stations of this broadcasting station: Ohno relay station, Tsuruga relay station, Mihama relay station, Obama relay station, Takahama relay station, and Mikuni relay station. The frequency of the Ohno relay station is 84.7 MHz, and the power of this relay station is 10W. The frequency of the Tsuruga relay station is 86.4 MHz, and the power of this relay station is 10W. The frequency of the Mihama relay station is 80.3 MHz, and the power of this relay station is 10W. The frequency of the Obama relay station is 82.5 MHz, and the power of this relay station is 100W. The frequency of the Takahama relay station is 82.0 MHz, and the power of this relay station is 3W. The frequency of the Mikuni relay station is 86.3 MHz, and the power of this relay station is 10W.

== Program ==
This station mainly has a major production program called "Life Is". "Life Is" is a large-scale regular live broadcast program in the morning, and broadcasts a wide variety of information such as sports culture in close contact with the community in addition to living information.

== Capital Structure ==
As of March 2018, the capital was 480 million yen, sales were 399.68 million yen, operating income was 10.97 million yen, ordinary income was 27.02 million yen, net income was 18.07 million yen, and net assets were 800 million yen. It was 9.17 million yen and total assets were 886.16 million yen. The number of employees was 12 as of April 1, 2018. As of March 2019, the capital was 100 million yen, the sales were 559.34 million yen, the operating income was 17.81 million yen, the ordinary income was 23.51 million yen, the net income was 15.55 million yen, and the net assets were 799.87 million yen. Yen and total assets were 887.26 million yen.

== Website ==
- Official website
