= Kyokuto Hoso Radio =

Former radio station in Okinawa Prefecture, Japan

JOTF
- Naha, Okinawa; Japan
- Frequency: 1251 kHz

Programming
- Format: Generalist

Ownership
- Owner: Kyokuto Broadcasting Co., Ltd.
- Operator: Kyokuto Broadcasting Co., Ltd.
- Sister stations: KSAB (1958–1972), KSBU (1961–1972)

History
- First air date: February 23, 1958
- Last air date: August 31, 1984
- Former call signs: KSDX (1958–1972)

Technical information
- Power: 5kW

Kyokutō Hōsō Radio (極東放送ラジオ) was a Japanese commercial radio station broadcasting to Okinawa Prefecture, founded in 1958 as a division of the Far East Broadcasting Company before switching to a secular commercial operation following the reversion of control of Okinawa to Japan, it was headquartered in Urasoe and had JOTF as its callsign. It is considered to be the predecessor of the current FM Okinawa.

== History ==
It was established on February 23, 1958, during the period of American rule by the American Christian corporate organization Far East Broadcasting Company (FEBC). Initially, only one low-power station (KSAB) was broadcasting in two languages, English and Japanese, targeting both Americans and Ryukuans. In February 1960, KSDX started broadcasting as a Japanese language station. In January 1961, KSBU started broadcasting as a Chinese language radio station, and among Japanese broadcasting stations including Okinawa under American rule, it held the unique distinction of being the only station operating on three frequencies, following NHK (Radio 1, Radio 2, FM). A 100 kW high-power transmitter installed in Kunigami Village was used for the Chinese language broadcast in order to propagate the message to China, which had no diplomatic relations with the United States at the time, making missionary activities difficult, and to advertise the United States to China.

At the beginning of the Japanese-language specialized station (KSDX), all of it was occupied by Christian-related programs due to the characteristics of religious broadcasting stations, but later PM ("Portable Missionary") plans promoted by FEBC Okinawa in the 1960s saw the dissemination of portable radios for KSDX's reception (1250kc fixed reception) free of charge in order to improve and enrich the faith and lives of poor families who did not have radios. Programming centered on the original purpose of Christian-related (Protestant) missionary programs and religious music (Christian music) such as hymns and gospels, as well as Ryukyu folk songs, the latest Western music, classical music, opera, etc. General programs such as general music programs, daily life information such as news, school broadcasts, and programs related to agriculture and fisheries began to be broadcast, but there were almost no entertainment programs. In these broadcasts, radio waves flowed almost all over Okinawa Prefecture (interference sometimes occurred in the Sakishima Islands and Daito Islands areas), so naturally non-Christian listeners were able to listen to the programs.

During the FEBC era, the genres of music aired were, of course, religious music such as hymns, gospels, and hymns, but also classical music and opera, with almost unlimited broadcast codes, and new records from the United States were arriving almost every week. However, some Japanese music, including Western music and Ryukyuan folk songs, wasn't allowed by the station because it would conflict with the code of conduct of the station. There were certain restrictions, such as not playing songs with suggestive lyrics.

In addition, the operating funds of the FEBC era were covered by corporate funds and donations from churches and believers, and commercials were not broadcast. Taking advantage of this feature, it is said that long sound sources such as classical music and opera were played in full performance in the program.

At the time of Okinawa's reversion to Japan on May 15, 1972, the Broadcasting Law of Japan did not recognize broadcasting stations and religious broadcasting stations operated by foreign corporations. Due to the close proximity to the U.S. military, it was initially planned to abolish Japanese and English broadcasting at the same time as the reversion to the mainland. In general, it was decided that only Japanese-language broadcasting would be left out of the operation of FEBC and continued in the direction of commercial broadcasting. However, Kamejiro Senaga, then a member of the House of Representatives, objected to this decision and pursued it with the government.

FEBC established the Asia Broadcasting Foundation (now Jeju Far East Broadcasting) in South Korea. A transmission facility was newly established on Jeju Island (Japanese programs are produced by the FEBC Japan branch in Tokyo). According to the "Law Concerning Special Measures Accompanying the Return of Okinawa", the Japanese language station was allowed to continue broadcasting for one year until the establishment of a Japanese corporation that succeeded the broadcasting business (the call sign was changed to JOTF), December 15, 1972. On the same day, the Far East Broadcasting Foundation was established. The English station remained a U.S. corporation and was allowed to continue broadcasting for five years (the call sign was changed to JOFF and was abolished in January 1977), but the Chinese station was not allowed to continue and was abolished upon its return. After that, Kyokuto Broadcasting, a Japanese corporation, joined the Japan Commercial Broadcasters Association on February 23, 1973. The abbreviation "KHR" (Kyokuto Hoso Radio) was selected.

On March 27, 1978, Kyokuto Broadcasting Co., Ltd. was established as a receiver of the broadcasting business. On April 25 of the same year, the broadcasting business was transferred from the Kyokuto Broadcasting Foundation to Kyokuto Broadcasting Co., Ltd. Along with this, the radio station license of Kyokuto Broadcasting was transferred to the same company.

As Kyokuto Broadcasting Co., Ltd., it formed partnerships with FM Tokyo and Radio Kanto (currently RF Radio Japan) to supply programs. Although it was a special situation, there were three commercial AM radio stations in Okinawa Prefecture at this time. From October 1973 until the abolition of medium wave broadcasting, time signal commercials were sponsored by the same FM stations in the four major cities (Tokyo, Aichi, Osaka, and Fukuoka). On the other hand, due to the nature of the organization and the two premier commercial radio stations in Okinawa (RBC and Radio Okinawa), the Local Private Broadcasting Joint Production Council (Tuesday Club), which consists of AM stations outside the Tokyo metropolitan area (Keihin area) and Osaka, it was consistently non-member until the abolition of medium wave broadcasting. The abolition was requested in September 1983 by the Diet of Japan.

Far East Broadcasting's medium wave broadcasting was discontinued after the special program broadcast on August 31, 1984, and was reorganized and renamed to FM Okinawa Co., Ltd. on September 1, the following day. FM broadcasting started from "JET STREAM" broadcast at 0:00 am on the same day. Far East Broadcasting actually stopped broadcasting in the early hours of September 1, and two frequencies coexisted until it stopped.
