= K-MIX =

Radio station in Shizuoka Prefecture, Japan

JOKU-FM
- Hamamatsu; Japan
- Broadcast area: Shizuoka Prefecture
- Frequency: 79.2 MHz
- Branding: K-MIX

Programming
- Language: Japanese
- Format: Full service; J-pop
- Affiliations: Japan FM Network

Ownership
- Owner: Shizuoka FM Broadcasting Co., Ltd.

History
- First air date: April 1, 1983

Technical information
- Licensing authority: MIC
- Power: 1 kilowatt (Shizuoka)

Links
- Website: http://www.k-mix.co.jp

Shizuoka FM Broadcasting (静岡エフエム放送), operating as K-MIX is an FM radio station in Shizuoka, Japan. A JFN affiliate, it was founded on June 21, 1982, and started broadcasting on April 1, 1983. Unlike other mass media outlets in the prefecture, it is headquartered in Hamamatsu, instead of the prefectural capital.

== Capital composition ==
As of 2015:

Capital	Total number of shares	Number of shareholders
490 million yen	120,000 shares	40

Shareholder	Number of shares	Percentage
Suzuki	23,895 shares	19.91%
Suzuki Business	7,000 shares	5.83%
Yamaha	4,850 shares	4.04%
Shizuoka Shimbun Printing Company	4,200 shares	3.50%
Shizuoka Bank	4,200 shares	3.50%
Nikkei, Inc.	4,000 shares	3.33%
Enshu Railway	3,800 shares	3.16%
Shizuoka Railway	3,800 shares	3.16%
Suzuyo	3,800 shares	3.16%
Hagoromo Foods	3,800 shares	3.16%
Nippon Paper Industries	3,800 shares	3.16%
Shizuoka Gas	3,800 shares	3.16%
Asahi Shimbun	3,675 shares	3.06%
Chunichi Shimbun	3,675 shares	3.06%
Yomiuri Shimbun (Tokyo Headquarters)	3,150 shares	2.62%
Yamaha Motor Company	3,150 shares	2.62%
Honda	3,000 shares	2.50%

== History ==
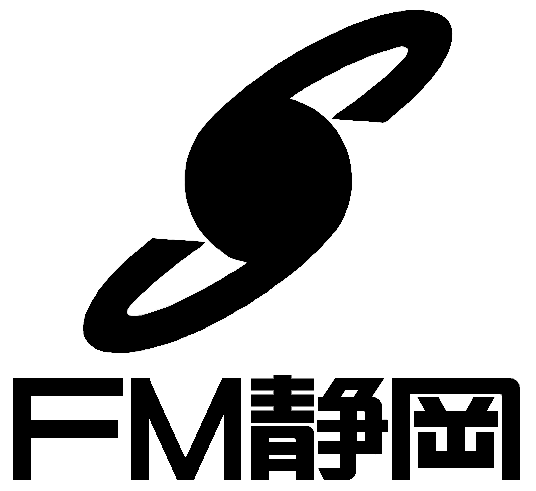
First logo as FM Shizuoka

The company was founded on June 21, 1982, and started broadcasting on April 1, 1983, as FM Shizuoka.

On April 1, 1993, the station was renamed K-MIX for its tenth anniversary. The new name reflected its identity: “K” was taken from its callsign (JOKU), while “MIX” stood for Music, Information, and Cross (X) Communication. By 2003, the station's website described its name as "JOKU-FM、MOVEMENT、INTELIGENCE、EXCITMENT". From fiscal 2013 to fiscal 2023, the MIX part was style in lowercase.

On April 29, 2016, it opened a satellite studio, view-st.ole fujieda, at the Ole Hotel in Fujieda.
