= FM Tokai =

Japanese radio station

FM Tokai (JS2AO (1958–1960), JS2H (1960–1970))
- Tokyo, Japan; Japan
- Broadcast area: Kantō region
- Frequencies: Initially 86.5 MHz (1958–1959), later 84.5 MHz (1959–1970)
- Branding: FM Tokai

Programming
- Language: Japanese
- Format: Experimental (1958–1960), Educational and Commercial (1960–1970)
- Affiliations: Tokai University Distance Education

Ownership
- Owner: Tokai University

History
- First air date: December 31, 1958
- Last air date: April 25, 1970
- Former frequencies: 86.5 MHz (1958–1959)

Technical information
- ERP: 1 kW

FM Tokai (Japanese: FM東海) was an experimental FM radio station in Tokyo that existed between 1958 and 1970. The station was the predecessor of Tokyo FM.

== History ==
In the 1950s, with the spread of television in Japan, Professor Tomio Yonebayashi of the Toyo University promoted the idea of an educational media system using both radio and television, catering high school students. Yonebayashi also suggested a two-channel educational television network.

In 1957, Tokai University president Shigeyoshi Matsumae announced his plans to start a test FM station with a transmitter located atop Mount Fuji. The goal was to conduct FM broadcasts with its primary target being Shizuoka Prefecture, in order to improve education among the Japanese youth. Matsumae planned an unmanned transmitter at Mount Fuji, being remotely controlled from Tokyo, but the unmanned nature of the transmitter raised some concerns. On March 1, 1958, FMT received a request to the Ministry of Posts and Telecommunications to begin operating, and the preliminary license was obtained on April 25.

The experimental license was granted on December 26, 1958, while a few days later, on December 31, 1958, FM Tokai started broadcasting. The station's callsign was JS2AO, on 86,5 MHz, 800kc away from NHK-FM's test station in Tokyo (87,3 MHz), with an output of 1KW. In October 1959, the station moved to 84,5 MHz, to avoid interference with VHF channel 1, which, in Tokyo, is used by NHK General TV.

The station's first day started with a speech by Matsumae and featured Beethoven's Symphony No. 9. In 1959, the station started a distance education program, which continued for over 40 years, even after the station was reconverted into a normal license, after which, the educational programs moved entirely to satellite and internet distribution.

On April 1, 1960, FMT moved to a full-time commercial license and changed its callsign to JS2H. Full-time commercial broadcasts started on May 2, 1960. In August, the station increased its airtime. In July 1961, FMT moved to a new studio at Invention Hall in Minato, Toranomon. The station founded its orchestra in 1963. As of 1961, an FMT-conducted study showed that only 18% of its listeners had an FM set.

In January 1966, FM Tokai was in a dire economical situation, given the fact that the Ministry of Posts and Telecommunications opted not to renew its experimental license. Minister Takeharu Kobayashi refused to renew JS2H's license in March 1968, leaving JS2AO alone in June. The university resisted, justifying its ten-year history, and reported to the regulators on July 7, 1968, under the grounds of violating the Radio Law. An agreement was later reached where the stocks of the Tokai University and the distance learning program would be inherited by the new company, which would become Tokyo FM (JOAU-FM). The station shut down on April 25, 1970; JOAU started broadcasting the following day, as a full-time regular FM station.

== Coverage area ==
The station was receivable in much of Kantō, with its coverage area including all of Tokyo Metropolis and adjacent areas in all six prefectures of the region, with the signal being weaker in the northern prefectures, not reaching at all the cities of Maebashi and Mito, capitals of Gunma Prefecture and Ibaraki Prefecture, respectively. It also had coverage in the easternmost side of Yamanashi Prefecture, without being received in any major city there.
