= Air-G' =

Radio station in Hokkaido, Japan

JOFU-FM
- Sapporo; Japan
- Broadcast area: Hokkaido
- Frequencies: 80.4 MHz (Mt. Teine); 79.2 MHz (Sapporo TV Tower)
- Branding: Air-G'

Programming
- Language: Japanese
- Format: Full Service, J-Pop
- Affiliations: Japan FM Network

Ownership
- Owner: FM Hokkaido Broadcasting, Ltd.

History
- First air date: September 15, 1982

Technical information
- Licensing authority: MIC
- ERP: 33,000 watts; 18.5 watts
- Transmitter coordinates: 43°4′35.87″N 141°11′38.95″E (Mt. Teine); 43°3′40.06″N 141°21′23.15″E (Sapporo TV Tower)

Links
- Website: https://www.air-g.co.jp/

FM Hokkaido (エフエム北海道), branded as Air-G', is an FM radio station in Hokkaido, Japan. It started broadcasting on September 15, 1982, and is one of the Japan FM Network flagships.

== Capital composition ==
As of 2015:

Capital	Total number of shares	Number of shareholders
490 million yen	10,000 shares	31

Capital	Number of shares	Percentage
Hokkaido Shimbun	3,190 shares	31.9%
Hokkaido Television Broadcasting	1,400 shares	14.0%

== History ==
On December 15, 1978, the Ministry of Posts and Telecommunications allocated FM frequencies to the Hokkaido, Miyagi, Shizuoka and Hiroshima prefectures, nearly a decade after the launch of the first four commercial FM stations in Tokyo, Nagoya, Osaka and Fukuoka. On August 1, 1980, the regulator approved the merger of the bids for the license. The company was founded in 1981, aiming to produce 50% of its programming locally On July 17, 1981, it obtained a preliminary license for the main station in Sapporo; then on April 16, 1982, for the relay station in Asahikawa. The station started broadcasting on September 15, 1982, initially only in Sapporo and Hakodate, however it established new relays in successive years to cover the whole island.

On April 6, 1992, coinciding with its tenth anniversary, the station adopted Air-G' as its commercial name.

In March 2023, it opened a satellite studio (F Studio) at Es Con Field Hokkaido. On October 25, it took part in a ten-day remote monitoring test with Television Hokkaido, the TV station's technical unit and Hokkaido Telecommunication Network (HOTnet) enabling the station's operations to be monitored remotely from TVH's own control room.On October 25, it participated in a ten-day remote monitoring test in which Television Hokkaido, the station’s technical division, and Hokkaido Telecommunication Network (HOTnet) enabled the station’s operations to be monitored remotely from TVH’s control room. This became permanent on December 1, 2024; the aim is to improve operational efficiency while addressing labor shortage issues.
