= FM Fukuoka =

Radio station in Fukuoka Prefecture, Japan

JODU-FM
- Fukuoka; Japan
- Broadcast area: Fukuoka Prefecture
- Frequencies: 80.7 MHz (Fukuoka); 80.0 MHz (Kitakyushu)
- Branding: FM Fukuoka

Programming
- Language: Japanese
- Format: Full service; J-pop
- Affiliations: Japan FM Network

Ownership
- Owner: FM Fukuoka Broadcasting Co., Ltd.

History
- First air date: June 1, 1970

Technical information
- Licensing authority: MIC
- ERP: 3 kilowatts

Links
- Website: www.fmfukuoka.co.jp

FM Fukuoka (エフエム福岡), Fukuoka, Japan. Launched on June 1, 1970, it is one of the four original FM stations of the Japan FM Network. The station, as well as other JFN affiliates in the island and in adjacent Yamaguchi Prefecture, is part of the FMQ League.

== Capital composition ==
As of 2015:

Capital	Total number of shares	Number of shareholders
200 million yen	400,000 shares	36

Capital	Number of shares	Percentage
Kyushu Electric Power Company	40,000 shares	10.00%
Iwasaki Construction	39,000 shares	9.75%
Nishinippon Yuuko Shoji	36,500 shares	9.12%
RKB Mainichi Broadcasting	24,000 shares	6.00%
Nishinippon Shimbun Publishing Company	24,000 shares	6.00%
Yomiuri Shimbun (Tokyo Headquarters)	24,000 shares	6.00%
Iwataya Mitsukoshi Ltd.	24,000 shares	6.00%
Asahi Shimbun Publishing Company	20,000 shares	5.00%
Nishi-Nippon City Bank	20,000 shares	5.00%

== History ==
The company was registered in 1969 and started broadcasting on June 1, 1970. The station's first president was Toshio Mori, who turned on its signal at the control room on launch day. At one point in the 1970s, before the 1981 formation of JFN, 95% of its programming consisted of music programming; the most predominant themes at the time were "movie themes, foreign pop music, mood music, foreign folk music and Japanese pop music". Most listeners were in their twenties and had a fast-growing female audience.

In August 2001, the station took part in an internet video streaming experiment, QGPOP, using RealNetworks software.
