= FM Fuji =

Radio station in Yamanashi Prefecture, Japan

JOCV-FM
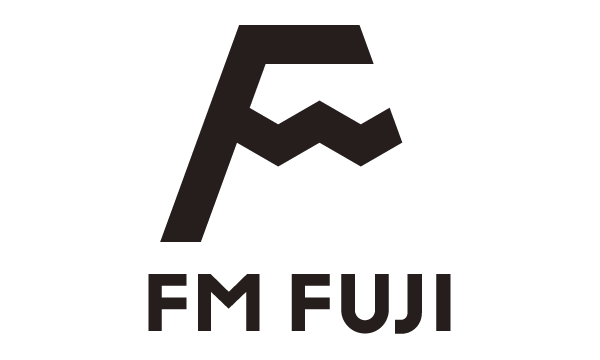
- Kōfu; Japan
- Broadcast area: Yamanashi Prefecture and parts of Kanto
- Frequency: 83.0 MHz (Kōfu)
- Branding: FM FUJI

Programming
- Language: Japanese
- Format: Full Service, J-Pop
- Affiliations: Independent

Ownership
- Owner: FM Fuji Co.,Ltd

History
- First air date: August 8, 1988

Technical information
- Licensing authority: MIC
- ERP: 1 kilowatt

Links
- Website: https://www.fmfuji.co.jp/

FM Fuji (エフエム富士) (stylized FM FUJI) is a radio station in Kōfu, capital of Yamanashi Prefecture. It was a member of the Japan FM Network until 1993, when it became an independent station.

== Capital composition ==
As of 2015:

| Capital | Total number of shares | Number of shareholders |
|---|---|---|
| 100 million yen | 16,000 shares | 21 |

| Capital | Number of shares | Percentage |
|---|---|---|
| UHF Television Yamanashi | 6,766 shares | 42.28% |
| Yamanashi Cultural Center | 1,440 shares | 9.00% |
| Yamanashi Broadcasting System | 1,280 shares | 8.00% |
| Yamanashi Nichinichi Shimbun Printing Company | 1,280 shares | 8.00% |

== History ==
FM Fuji was registered on December 14, 1987 and started broadcasting at 8:08am on August 8, 1988. Initially, it was an affiliate of the Japan FM Network, but, during its early years, the station was diverging from the network and airing more programs of its own. On April 1, 1993, the station left its JFN affiliation and became an independent station.

In April 2018, the station implemented its new logo.

Among its major awards are a 2021 Japan Commercial Broadcasters Association award for its program Rojiura Base and its 2014 Taisetsu no Koe radio spot.

== Reception ==
While the station is largely based in Yamanashi Prefecture, thanks to the Mitsutoge relay transmitter, it can be received in parts of Kanto: parts of the Tama area and central Tokyo, Kanagawa Prefecture, Chiba Prefecture, Saitama Prefecture and Ibaraki Prefecture. Its independent status is to differentiate it from FM stations receivable in Tokyo.
