= Japan FM Network =

Commercial radio network in Japan

- Type: commercial radio network
- Country: Japan
- Broadcast area: Nationwide
- Headquarters: JFN Center, Chiyoda, Tokyo, Japan

Ownership
- Owner: The Japan FM Network Company

History
- Founded: 20 May 1981; 31 May 1984 (as a company)

Coverage
- Availability: Nationwide
- Affiliates: See list

Links
- Website: JFN.co.jp; JapanFMNetwork.com

Tokyo FM and InterFM headquarters in Chiyoda, Tokyo.

Japan FM Network (JFN; Japanese: 全国FM放送協議会, romanized: Zenkoku Efu Emu Hōsō Kyōgi-kai, lit. 'National FM Broadcasting Council') is a Japanese commercial radio network. It was founded in 1981.

Tokyo FM is the flagship station of the network.

== Overview ==
FM Tokyo (Tokyo FM), FM Aichi, FM Osaka, and FM Fukuoka, the initial commercial FM stations, established a network protocol on 20 May 1981. This followed the launch of the first stereo broadcasting line on 1 April 1980. TOKYO FM serves as the key station. The council's secretariat is located in the JFN Center Building at 1-8 Koji-cho, Chiyoda Ward, Tokyo, near the headquarters of TOKYO FM, with many member bureaus' Tokyo branch offices also situated in the building.

== List of affiliates ==
Stations are listed in Japanese order of prefectures which is mirrored in ISO 3166-2:JP.

Broadcasting area(s)		Station			Frequency	Start date of broadcast	Date of affiliation	Note(s)
Prefecture	Region	On air branding	Abbr.	Call sign	Frequency	Start date of broadcast	Date of affiliation	Note(s)
Hokkaidō		Air-G'	N/A	JOFU-FM	80.4 MHz	15 September 1982	15 September 1982	
Aomori	Tōhoku	FM Aomori	AFB	JOWU-FM	80.0 MHz	1 April 1987	1 April 1987	
Iwate	Tōhoku	FM Iwate	N/A	JOQU-FM	76.1 MHz	1 October 1985	1 October 1985	
Miyagi	Tōhoku	Date FM	N/A	JOJU-FM	77.1 MHz	1 December 1982	1 December 1982	
Akita	Tōhoku	FM Akita	AFM	JOPU-FM	82.8 MHz	1 April 1985	1 April 1985	
Yamagata	Tōhoku	FM Yamagata / Rhythm Station	N/A	JOEV-FM	80.4 MHz	1 April 1989	1 April 1989	
Fukushima	Tōhoku	Fukushima FM	N/A	JOTV-FM	81.8 MHz	1 October 1995	1 October 1995	
Tochigi	Kantō	Radio Berry	N/A	JOSV-FM	76.4 MHz	1 April 1994	1 April 1994	
Gunma	Kantō	FM Gunma	N/A	JORU-FM	86.3 MHz	1 October 1985	1 October 1985	
Tokyo	Kantō	Tokyo FM	TFM	JOAU-FM	80.0 MHz	26 April 1970	20 May 1981	Eastern flagship station
Niigata	Chūbu	FM Niigata	N/A	JOXU-FM	77.5 MHz	1 October 1987	1 October 1987	
Toyama	Chūbu	FM Toyama	N/A	JOOU-FM	82.7 MHz	1 April 1985	1 April 1985	
Ishikawa	Chūbu	Hello Five / FM Ishikawa	N/A	JOHV-FM	80.5 MHz	1 April 1990	1 April 1990	
Fukui	Chūbu	FM Fukui	N/A	JOLU-FM	76.1 MHz	18 December 1984	18 December 1984	
Nagano	Chūbu	FM Nagano	N/A	JOZU-FM	79.7 MHz	1 October 1988	1 October 1988	
Gifu	Chūbu	FM Gifu	N/A	JOXV-FM	80.0 MHz	1 April 2001	1 April 2001	
Shizuoka	Chūbu	K-MIX	N/A	JOKU-FM	79.2 MHz	1 April 1983	1 April 1983	
Aichi	Chūbu	FM Aichi	N/A	JOCU-FM	80.7 MHz	24 December 1969	20 May 1981	
Mie	Kansai	Radio Cube FM Mie	N/A	JONU-FM	78.9 MHz	1 June 1985	1 June 1985	
Shiga	Kansai	E-Radio	N/A	JOUV-FM	77.0 MHz	1 December 1996	1 December 1996	
Osaka	Kansai	FM Osaka	N/A	JOBU-FM	85.1 MHz	1 April 1970	20 May 1981	Western flagship station
Hyōgo	Kansai	Kiss FM Kobe	N/A	JOIV-FM	89.9 MHz	1 October 1990	1 April 2003	Previously an independent station until 31 March 2003
Tottori and Shimane	Chūgoku	FM San-in / V-air	FSK	JOVU-FM	77.4 MHz	1 October 1986	1 October 1986	
Okayama	Chūgoku	FM Okayama / VVFM	N/A	JOVV-FM	76.8 MHz	1 April 1999	1 April 1999	
Hiroshima	Chūgoku	Hiroshima FM	HFM	JOGU-FM	78.2 MHz	5 December 1982	5 December 1982	
Yamaguchi	Chūgoku	FM Yamaguchi	FMY	JOUU-FM	79.2 MHz	1 December 1985	1 December 1985	
Tokushima	Shikoku	FM Tokushima	N/A	JOMV-FM	80.7 MHz	1 April 1992	1 April 1992	
Kagawa	Shikoku	FM Kagawa	N/A	JOYU-FM	78.6 MHz	1 April 1988	1 April 1988	
Ehime	Shikoku	FM Ehime	N/A	JOEU-FM	79.7 MHz	1 February 1982	1 February 1982	
Kōchi	Shikoku	FM Kochi / Hi-Six	N/A	JOLV-FM	81.6 MHz	1 April 1992	1 April 1992	
Fukuoka	Kyūshū	FM Fukuoka	N/A	JODU-FM	80.7 MHz	15 July 1970	20 May 1981	
Saga	Kyūshū	FM Saga	FMS	JONV-FM	77.9 MHz	1 April 1992	1 April 1992	
Nagasaki	Kyūshū	FM Nagasaki	N/A	JOHU-FM	79.5 MHz	1 October 1982	1 October 1982	
Kumamoto	Kyūshū	FM Kumamoto	FMK	JOSU-FM	77.4 MHz	1 November 1985	1 November 1985	
Ōita	Kyūshū	FM Oita / Air-Radio FM88	N/A	JOJV-FM	88.0 MHz	1 October 1990	1 October 1991	Previously an independent station until 30 September 1991
Miyazaki	Kyūshū	Joy FM	N/A	JOMU-FM	83.2 MHz	1 December 1984	1 December 1984	
Kagoshima	Kyūshū	μ FM	N/A	JOOV-FM	79.8 MHz	1 October 1992	1 October 1992	
Okinawa	Kyūshū	FM Okinawa	N/A	JOIU-FM	87.3 MHz	1 September 1984	1 September 1984	Previously broadcast on AM as KHR until 31 August 1984

=== FMQ League ===
FMQ League (Japanese: FMQリーグ, romanized: FMQ Rīgu) is a group of radio stations mostly comprising JFN affiliates in the region of Kyūshū; FM Okinawa is not a part of this group, but FMQ League is joined by FM Yamaguchi from Chūgoku region. FM Fukuoka serves as the chief station.

=== Areas without a JFN station ===
The prefectures the JFN is yet to have a presence are Chiba, Ibaraki, Kanagawa, Kyoto, Nara, Saitama, Wakayama and Yamanashi. Ibaraki had no assigned frequency, the local frequency was used by NHK FM in 1992.

==== Frequency assigned, but yet to be launched ====
- Nara - 85.8 MHz
- Wakayama - 77.2 MHz

=== Special affiliates ===
Broadcasting area(s)	Station			Frequency	Start date of broadcast	Date of affiliation	Note(s)
Broadcasting area(s)	On air branding	Abbr.	Call sign	Frequency	Start date of broadcast	Date of affiliation	Note(s)
Palau (nationwide)	Eco Paradise FM / Ngerel Belau	EPFM	T8AA-FM	87.9 MHz	1 August 1998	23 July 2003	Relays certain Japanese language programmes from Tokyo FM
Greater Tokyo Area, Kantō	InterFM	N/A	JODW-FM	89.7 MHz	1 April 1996	1 September 2020	Broadcasts certain programmes produced by the JFN Company since 1 November 2020

=== Former affiliate station ===
Broadcasting area(s)		Station			Frequency	Years of affiliation	Current affiliation	Note(s)
Prefecture	Region	On air branding	Abbr.	Call sign	Frequency	Years of affiliation	Current affiliation	Note(s)
Yamanashi	Chūbu	FM Fuji	N/A	JOCV-FM	83.0 MHz	1988–1993	Independent	Joined JFN with the opening of the station on 8 August 1988; became an independent station in April 1993
