= NHK Sasebo Branch =

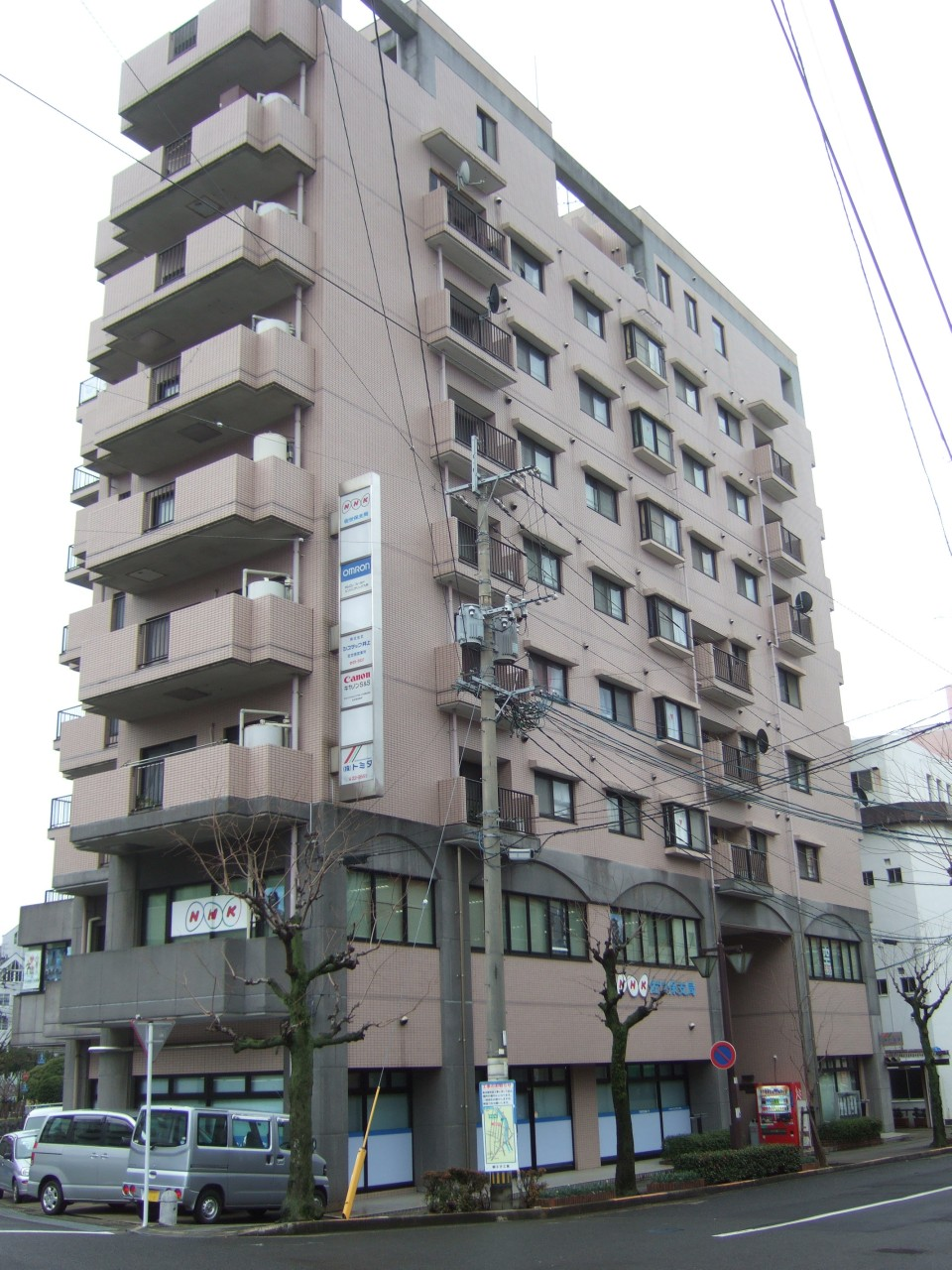
The building where the branch operates (February 2010)

The NHK Sasebo Branch (NHK佐世保支局, NHK Sasebo Shikyoku) is a division of the NHK Nagasaki Broadcasting Station which is in charge of news gathering operations in Sasebo and the northern half of Nagasaki Prefecture. It used to operate a full radio and television service until 1991.

== History ==
The station started broadcasting in 1946 using the JOAT callsign. Radio 2 used the JOAY callsign. At an unknown date, NHK had the callsigns realigned. JOAT became JOAQ and JOAY became JOAZ. Television broadcasts started in 1958, the same year as the station in Nagasaki.

On March 1, 1965, it started relaying JOAG-FM from Nagasaki.

The station was demoted from a broadcasting station to a branch in 1991, being relocated to a rented office in Motomachi. The former building was transferred to city control after the removal of the tower, the antennas and the transmitting equipment. From 1996, it was used as a building for the Fureai Center, but closed in January 2015 due to deterioration.

Long after the end of local programming, the NHK digital terrestrial transmitter network reached Sasebo on April 1, 2007, exactly two months before the commercial networks. NHK G broadcasts on UHF channel 42 and NHK E on UHF channel 40.
