= Kyoto Broadcasting System =

Radio and television station in Kyoto Prefecture, Japan

Kyoto Broadcasting System Company Limited
- Logo used since 1981.

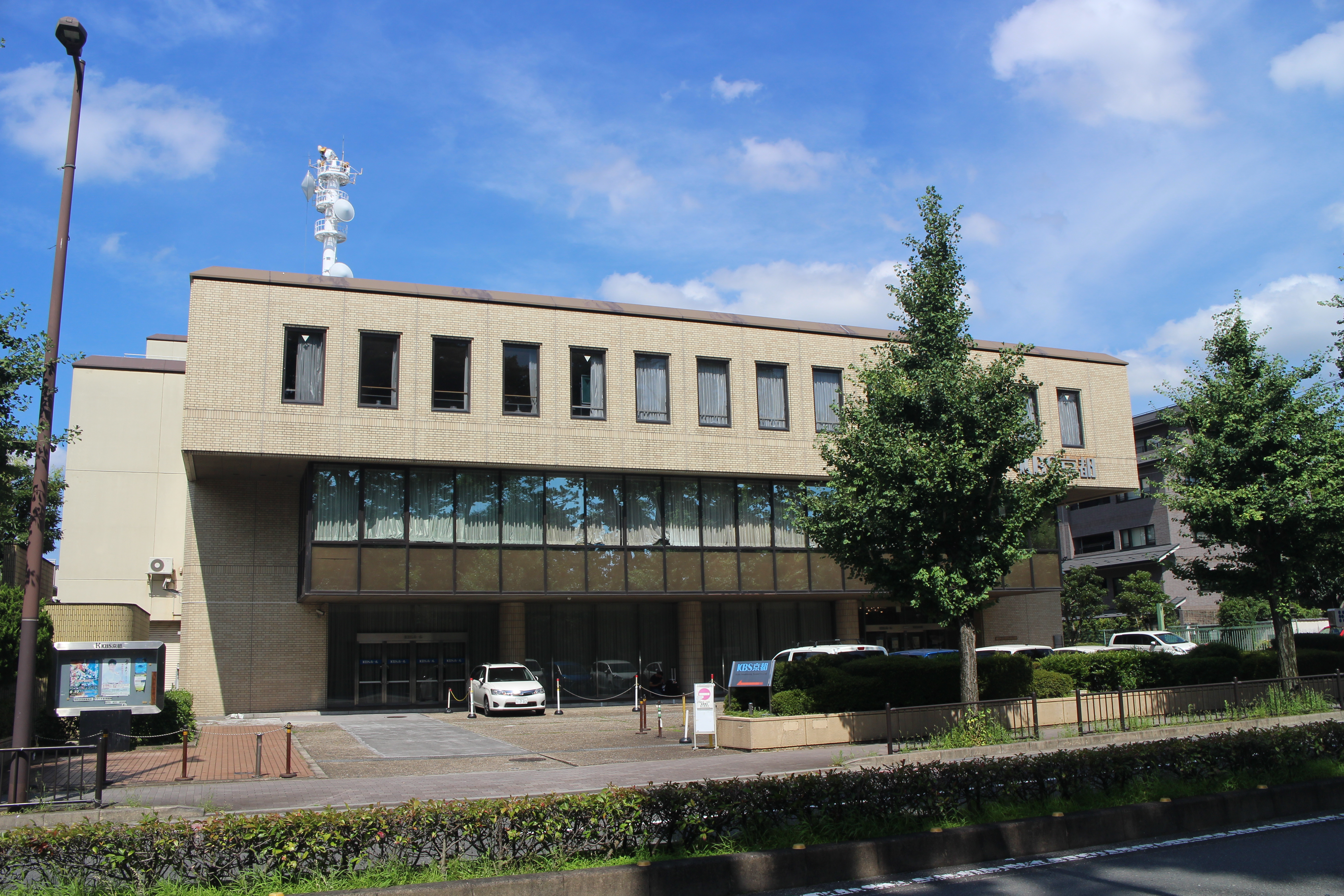
- Headquarters in Kamigyo-ku, Kyoto
- Trade name: KBS Kyoto
- Native name: 株式会社京都放送
- Romanized name: Kabushiki-gaisha Kyōto Hōsō
- Formerly: Kyoto Broadcasting System Company Limited (1951-1964); Kinki Broadcasting System Company Limited (1964-1995)
- Type: Private KK
- Industry: Media
- Founded: KBS Kyoto: June 26, 1951; 75 years ago KBS Shiga: May 25, 1960; 66 years ago
- Headquarters: Karasuma Street, Kamigyo-ku, Kyoto, Japan
- Key people: Shunsuke Hosoi (president and CEO)
- Services: Radio and television network
- Website: kbs-kyoto.co.jp

JOBR
- Kyoto; Japan
- Broadcast area: Kyoto Prefecture
- Frequencies: 1143 kHz (AM); 94.9 MHz (FM)
- Branding: KBS Kyoto Radio

Programming
- Language: Japanese
- Format: Talk, Sports
- Affiliations: NRN

Ownership
- Owner: Kyoto Broadcasting System Company Limited

History
- First air date: December 24, 1951; 74 years ago
- Call sign meaning: Kyoto BRoadcasting

Technical information
- Licensing authority: MIC

JOBR-DTV
- Kyoto Prefecture; Japan
- City: Kyoto
- Channels: Digital: 23 (UHF); Virtual: 5
- Branding: KBS Kyoto Television

Programming
- Affiliations: Independent (member of JAITS)

Ownership
- Owner: Kyoto Broadcasting System Company Limited

History
- First air date: April 1, 1969; 57 years ago
- Former call signs: JOBR-TV (1969–2011)
- Former channel numbers: Analog: 34 (UHF, 1969–2011)

Technical information
- Licensing authority: MIC

Kyoto Broadcasting System Co., Ltd. (株式会社京都放送, Kabushiki-gaisha Kyōto Hōsō; KBS) is a commercial broadcasting station headquartered in Kyoto, Japan. It is doing business in Kyoto Prefecture as KBS Kyoto (KBS京都) and in Shiga Prefecture as KBS Shiga (KBS滋賀).

Its radio station serves Kyoto and Shiga Prefectures and is a member of National Radio Network (NRN). Its television station serves Kyoto Prefecture and is a member of the Japanese Association of Independent Television Stations (JAITS). Since April 1, 2005, KBS is broadcasting digital television in ISDB format.

== History ==
Main source:

- 24 December 1951: 京都放送 (Kyōto Hōsō, KHK) opens as Radio Kyoto (ラジオ京都, Rajio Kyōto).
- 1964: Changes company name to Kinki Broadcasting System (近畿放送, Kinki Hōsō; KBS).
- 1968: Starts television test transmission from Mount Hiei.
- 1969: Starts television broadcasting service. Networking with Tokyo 12 channel (now TV Tokyo) and Nippon Educational Television (now TV Asahi.) (Currently KBS is not a member of eithers' network.)
- 1981: Began doing business as "KBS Kyoto".
- It was involved with the Itoman fraud case for a certain period of time in 1990s which risked the company to bankruptcy.
- 1994: Some employees went to court for Corporation Reorganization Law (会社更生法, Kaisha Kōsei Hō) to save KBS.
- 1995: Changed to company name to Kyoto Broadcasting System Co., Ltd. (株式会社京都放送, Kabushiki-gaisha Kyōto Hōsō; KBS), reviving the original Japanese name.
- 1999: The corporation reorganization procedure begins.
- 1 April 2005: Starts digital television broadcasting.
- 2007: The corporation reorganization procedure is complete.
- 2008: Well known toy brand Tomy releases a Kyoto Broadcasting System Choro-Q toy van edition

== See also ==
- UHF (Independent UHF Station)
- List of radio stations in Japan
