= Hiroshima FM =

JOGU-FM
- Hiroshima; Japan
- Broadcast area: Hiroshima; Okayama; Yamaguchi; Shimane; Ehime; Kagawa
- Frequency: 78.2 MHz
- Branding: Hiroshima FM

Programming
- Format: Adult contemporary; news/talk

Ownership
- Owner: Hiroshima FM Broadcasting Co., Ltd.

History
- First air date: December 5, 1982

Technical information
- ERP: 1,000 watts

Links
- Website: hfm.jp

Hiroshima FM is an FM and Teletext radio station in Hiroshima for around Seto Inland area.

The station was founded on February 27, 1982, and went on the air on December 5, 1982.

It is the 9th nongovernmental FM radio station in Japan, and a member of Japan FM Network.

== Frequencies ==
- Hiroshima Bay - 78.2 MHz
- Ōsakikamijima - 76.4 MHz
- Onomichi - 77.1 MHz
- Higashihiroshima - 77.8 MHz
- Hiroshima North - 80.4 MHz
- Hiroshima West - 81.3 MHz
- Sera - 81.4 MHz
- Kure - 81.7 MHz
- Fukuyama - 82.1 MHz
- Hiroshima Mountain - 82.3 MHz
- Miyoshi - 83.5 MHz
- Fuchū - 85.5 MHz
- Kitahiroshima - 86.3 MHz

== Hiroshima FM Broadcasting Co., Ltd. ==
Hiroshima FM Broadcasting Co., Ltd. (広島エフエム放送株式会社, Hiroshima Efu Emu Hoso Kabushiki Gaisha) is the owner of the station. Its stakeholders are:

- Hiroshima Toyo Carp - 14.25%
- Chugoku Shimbun - 8.1%
- Hiroshi Matsuda - 7.1%
- Tokyo FM - 5%

== Studios ==
- HFM HQ studio
- Kamiya-cho Shareo studio
- Futaba-Tosho TERA satellite studio
- YYY studio
- DEODEO Neverland Fukuro-machi FMDJ studio
