= Nagasaki (surname) =

Nagasaki (written: 長崎) is a Japanese surname. Notable people with the surname include:

- Hiroko Nagasaki (長崎 宏子; born 1968), Japanese swimmer
- Kenji Nagasaki (長崎健司), Japanese director
- Kento Nagasaki (長崎 健人; born 1990), Japanese footballer
- Kotaro Nagasaki (長崎 幸太郎; born 1968), Japanese politician
- Miyu Nagasaki (長﨑美柚; born 2002), Japanese table tennis player.
- Shunichi Nagasaki (長崎 俊一; born 1956), Japanese film director and screenwriter
- Takashi Nagasaki (長崎 尚志; born 1956), Japanese author, manga writer and former editor of manga

== Fictional characters ==
- Soyo Nagasaki (長崎 そよ), a character in the media franchise BanG Dream!

== See also ==
- Kendo Nagasaki, a professional wrestling stage name
