= Aomori FM Broadcasting =

JOWU-FM
- Aomori; Japan
- Broadcast area: Aomori Prefecture
- Frequency: 80.0 MHz
- Branding: FM Aomori

Programming
- Language: Japanese
- Format: Full-service, J-pop
- Affiliations: Japan FM Network

Ownership
- Owner: Aomori FM Broadcasting Co., Ltd.

History
- First air date: 1 April 1987

Technical information
- Licensing authority: MIC
- Power: 1,000 watts
- ERP: 2,600 watts
- Transmitter coordinates: 40°49′44.41″N 140°34′37.79″E
- Repeaters: Hachinohe 78.4 MHz, 500 watts; Mutsu: 81.3 MHz, 100 watts; Kamikita: 84.3 MHz, 10 watts

Links
- Website: afb.co.jp

Aomori FM Broadcasting Co., Ltd. (株式会社エフエム青森, Kabushiki-gaisha FM Aomori) is a Japanese FM station, an affiliate of the Japan FM Network. Its headquarters are located in Aomori Prefecture.

== See also ==
- Japan FM Network
- Other stations in Aomori:
  - Aomori Broadcasting Corporation
  - Aomori Television
  - Asahi Broadcasting Aomori
