= FM Toyohashi =

Community radio station in Toyohashi, Japan

Coordinates: 34°45′13.17″N 137°24′21.46″E

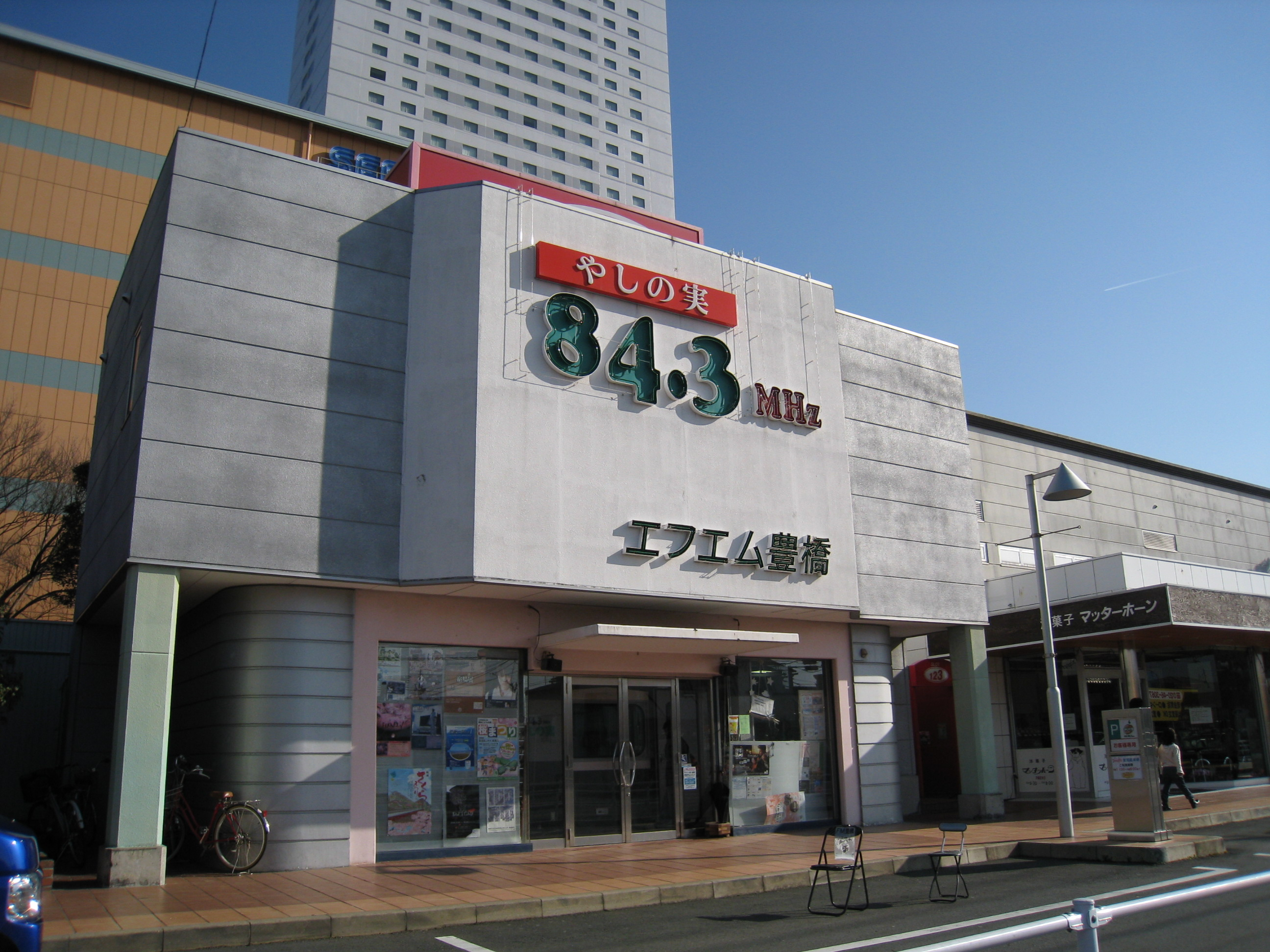

Japan
- Broadcast area: Toyohashi, Japan
- Frequency: 84.3 MHz
- Branding: FM Toyohashi

Programming
- Format: Community radio

History
- First air date: 18 August 1992

Technical information
- ERP: 20 watts

Links
- Website: www.843fm.co.jp

FM Toyohashi (エフエム豊橋) (JOZZ6AA-FM, 84.3 MHz) is a community FM radio station in Toyohashi, Aichi Prefecture, Japan. It is the third "community FM radio station" opened in Japan. Its broadcast reach an area roughly bounded by Hamamatsu, Shizuoka in the east, and Gamagori and Shinshiro, Aichi in the west. It broadcasts 24 hours a day, except parts of Sunday nights during which it carries the signal of Tokyo MusicBird transmissions.

== History ==
FM Toyohashi first started broadcasting in Toyohashi and on the trains of the Toyohashi Railway on August 18, 1992 as a mini FM radio station with a very low output power, which just enabled it qualify as a community FM radio station. Once it became established with an assigned frequency of 84.3 MHz, it raised its output power to 1 watt in 1993, to 10 watts in 1995 and to 20 watts in 1999, resulting in a much larger broadcasting area.

== Features ==
- Broadcasting from the southeastern portion of Aichi prefecture, its programming focuses on Shizuoka prefecture west. Hence the name "Community FM Radio station."
- It has a very high listenership, especially given its very low transmitting power and community FM status.
- Also interchange with the Hamamatsu FM broadcast (FM Haro!) of Hamamatsu city and Iida FM broadcast of Ida city is active. Personality and staff of three bureaus being even in all, there are also times when live programming is done.
- From 1996 to 2002, the radio station transmitted a one-hour programme in Portuguese for the large Brazilian minority in the Aichi Prefecture.
- Its transmission antenna is on the 120-meter Holiday Tower, the highest building in Toyohashi.
