= FM Aichi =

JOCU-FM
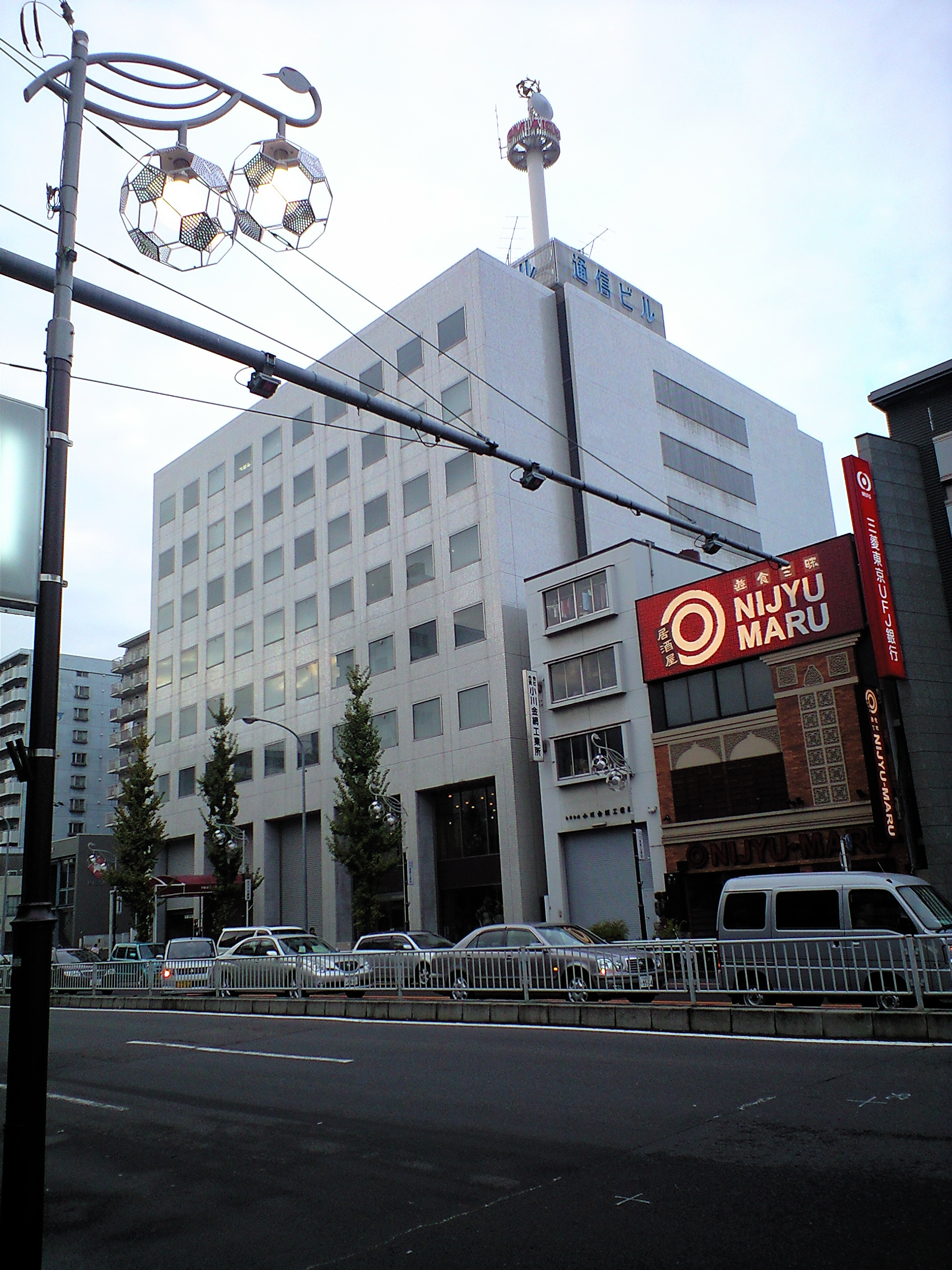
- Naka-ku, Nagoya; Japan
- Broadcast area: Aichi Prefecture
- Frequency: 80.7 MHz
- Branding: FM Aichi,@FM

Programming
- Language: Japanese
- Format: Full service; J-pop
- Affiliations: Japan FM Network

Ownership
- Owner: FM Aichi Co., Ltd.

History
- First air date: December 24, 1969

Technical information
- Power: 10,000 watts
- Translator: Toyohashi, Aichi: 81.3 MHz

Links
- Website: fma.co.jp/pc/home/index.php

FM Aichi (エフエム愛知) is an FM radio station in Aichi Prefecture, Japan. The station is an affiliate of Japan FM Network (JFN).

FM Aichi's main studios are located in Tsurumai in Naka-ku, Nagoya.

== See also ==
- List of radio stations in Japan
