= NHK Nagasaki Broadcasting Station =

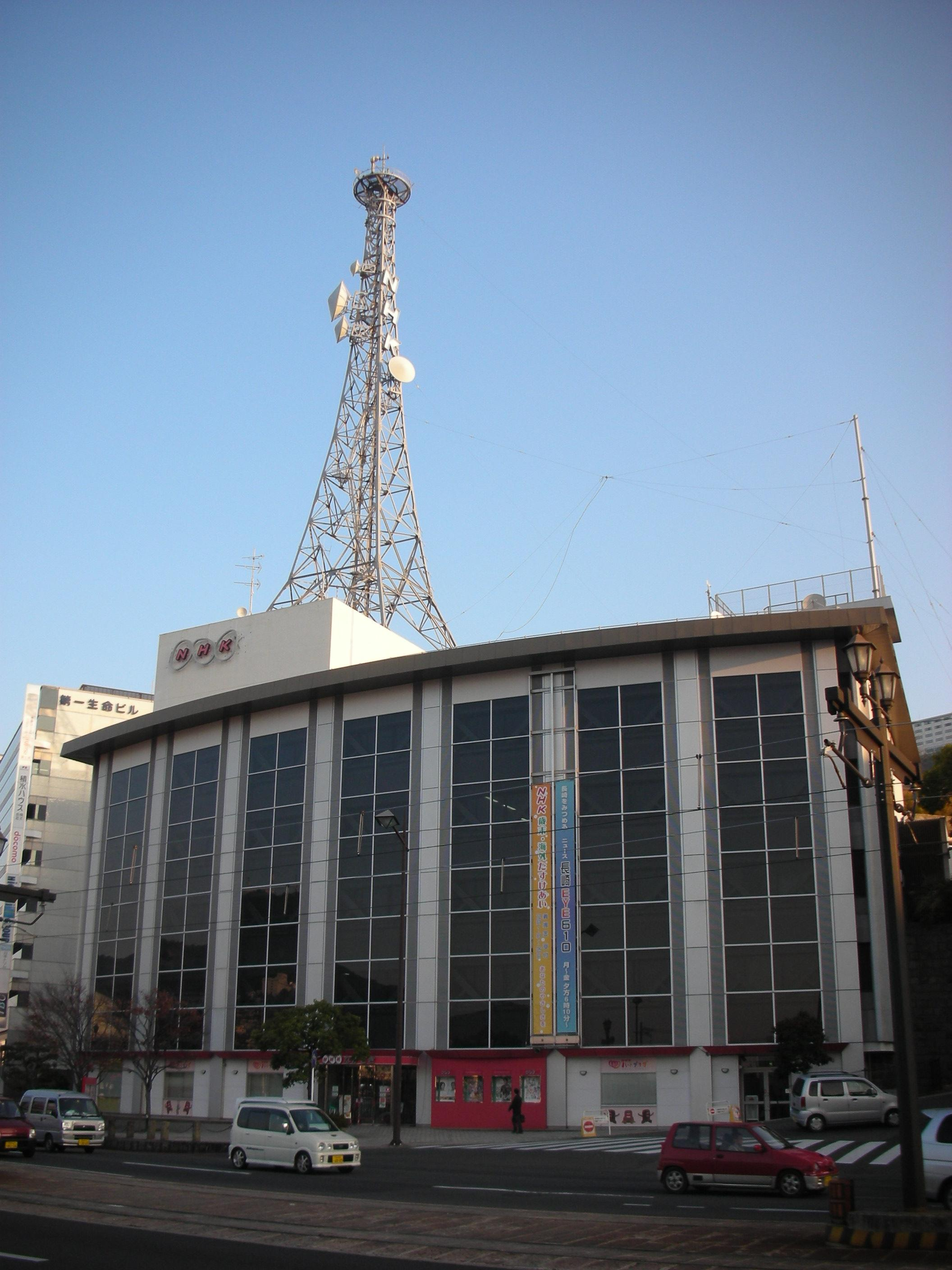
NHK Nagasaki Broadcasting Station

The NHK Nagasaki Broadcasting Station (NHK長崎放送局, NHK Nagasaki Hōsō Kyoku) is a unit of the NHK that oversees terrestrial broadcasting in Nagasaki Prefecture. The NHK Sasebo Branch used to be responsible for the northern half of the prefecture, but is now secondary.

== History ==
Radio station JOAG opened on September 20, 1933. It was destroyed by the atomic bombing on August 9, 1945, and returned to the air on August 13. Radio 2 (JOAC) started broadcasting on July 20, 1949.

NHK General Television broadcasts started on December 23, 1958, more than a week before Nagasaki Broadcasting, and Educational Television on January 20, 1964. Four months later, on May 20, NHK FM started broadcasting (JOAC-FM).

From April 2018, all local news and weather information on weekends and holidays (including year-end and New Year holidays) were unified into the Kyushu-Okinawa news block from Fukuoka, except for elections and disasters, in principle, for both TV and radio. Local news and weather information from Nagasaki were available only on weekdays. From the April reorganization in 2022, local news and weather information in the prefecture will be broadcast only on Saturdays, Sundays, and holidays at 18:45 (TV and radio outside of this time zone are mainly used during long holidays and during the Obon holidays. During the year-end and New Year period, as a general rule, Kyushu-Okinawa block news from Fukuoka will be broadcast as usual).

NHK+ added Nagasaki programming on May 15, 2023.

2023 was marked as the year of the 90th anniversary of the Nagasaki Broadcasting Station, introducing in April a new tagline, "Go Forward with Nagasaki".
