= FM Nagasaki =

Radio station in Nagasaki Prefecture, Japan

JOHU-FM
- Nagasaki; Japan
- Broadcast area: Nagasaki Prefecture
- Frequency: 79.5 MHz
- Branding: FM Nagasaki

Programming
- Language: Japanese
- Format: Full Service, J-Pop
- Affiliations: Japan FM Network

Ownership
- Owner: FM Nagasaki Broadcasting Co.

History
- First air date: October 1, 1982

Technical information
- Licensing authority: MIC
- Power: 1 kilowatt (Nagasaki)

Links
- Website: http://www.fmnagasaki.co.jp

FM Nagasaki (エフエム長崎) is an FM radio station in Nagasaki, Japan. Founded in 1982, the station is a member of both the Japan FM Network and the FMQ League.

== Capital composition ==
As of 2015:

Capital	Total number of shares	Number of shareholders
100 million yen	8,850 shares	37

Shareholder	Number of shares	Percentage
Lucky Holdings	3,398 shares	38.39%
Nishinippon Shimbun Printing Company	700 shares	7.90%
Yomiuri Shimbun (Osaka Headquarters)	640 shares	7.23%
FM Service	447 shares	5.05%
Fuji Media Holdings	400 shares	4.51%
Shinwa Bank	400 shares	4.51%
Kyushu Electric Power	400 shares	4.51%
Nagasaki Motor Bus	326 shares	3.68%
Eighteenth Bank	300 shares	3.38%
Nishi-Nippon City Bank	300 shares	3.38%

== History ==
FM Nagasaki was established on April 12, 1982, commencing regular broadcasts on October 1 of the same year. By 1990, it had established a flexible mass production system.

== Reception ==
The station's signal can be received in the Tokyo metropolitan area during Sporadic-E season from May to August; sometimes causing interference with NACK5 from Saitama, which broadcasts on the same frqeuency (79.5 MHz).。

Main station	Frequency	Output
Nagasaki	79.5MHz	1kW
Relay station	Frequency	Output
Sasebo	80.3MHz	300W
Isahaya	78.9MHz	30W
Hirado	79.2MHz	10W
Shimabara	89.3MHz	10W
Minamiarima	77.8MHz	3W
