= FM Fukuyama =

Radio Bingo (JOZZ8AA-FM)
- Japan
- Broadcast area: Fukuyama/ Onomichi/ Fuchū/ Jinsekikogen/ Ibara/ Kasaoka
- Frequency: 77.7 MHz

Programming
- Format: News/Talk/Music

History
- First air date: August 8, 1996
- Call sign meaning: FM Fukuyama

Technical information
- ERP: 20 watts

Links
- Website: fm777.co.jp/pc/

FM Fukuyama (RADIO BINGO) is a Japanese local FM radio station in Fukuyama.

The station was founded on January 9, 1996, and went on the air on August 8, 1996.
