= National Mutual Insurance Federation of Agricultural Cooperatives =

JA Kyosai logo

The National Mutual Insurance Federation of Agricultural Cooperatives (Japanese: 全国共済農業協同組合連合会), commonly known as "JA Kyosai" (JA共済) or ZENKYOREN, is Japan's national mutual aid association of agricultural cooperatives, founded based on Japan's Agricultural Cooperative Law. ZENKYOREN was founded in 1951 and provides property, liability and life insurance.
