= FM Okinawa =

Radio station in Okinawa Prefecture, Japan

JOIU-FM
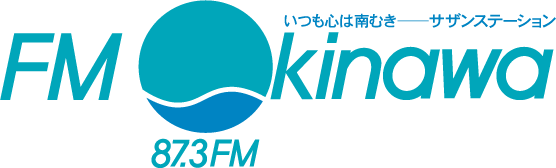
- Naha, Okinawa; Japan
- Broadcast area: Okinawa Prefecture
- Frequency: 87.3 MHz
- Branding: FM Okinawa

Programming
- Language: Japanese
- Format: Full service; J-pop
- Affiliations: Japan FM Network

Ownership
- Owner: FM Okinawa Co., Ltd.

History
- First air date: September 1, 1984

Technical information
- Licensing authority: MIC
- Power: 1,000 watts (Naha); 100 watts (Nakijin)
- Translator: Nakijin: 83.7 MHz

Links
- Website: http://www.fmokinawa.co.jp

FM Okinawa (エフエム沖縄) is an FM radio station in Okinawa, Japan. The station is an affiliate of the Japan FM Network (JFN). It started broadcasting on September 1, 1984, replacing its existing AM radio station Far East Broadcasting (極東放送) which started broadcasting in February 1958.

The station is also receivable at Yoronjima in Kagoshima Prefecture and parts of the Amami Islands. Some of the station's programs are also broadcast on FM Miyako (76.5 MHz), a community FM radio station for the Miyako-jima island due to no relay transmitters in Sakishima Islands and Daito Island.

The station is also receivable in Honshu in good conditions during Sporadic E layer outbreak layer conditions which happen from the middle of May until late June.

The station broadcasts 24 hours a day which starts at 5:00 am every day. However the station will be closed for maintenance between 1:00 and 5:00 am on Monday early mornings (Sunday late night).

== History ==
The Japanese government gave a license for an FM station on October 27, 1982. The station started on September 1, 1984 as the eleventh commercial FM radio station to launch in Japan. It was created as a plan concerning the interferences the former KHR had to face with Voice of Moscow relay stations coming out of eastern Russia.
