= FM Osaka =

Radio station in Osaka, Japan

JOBU-FM
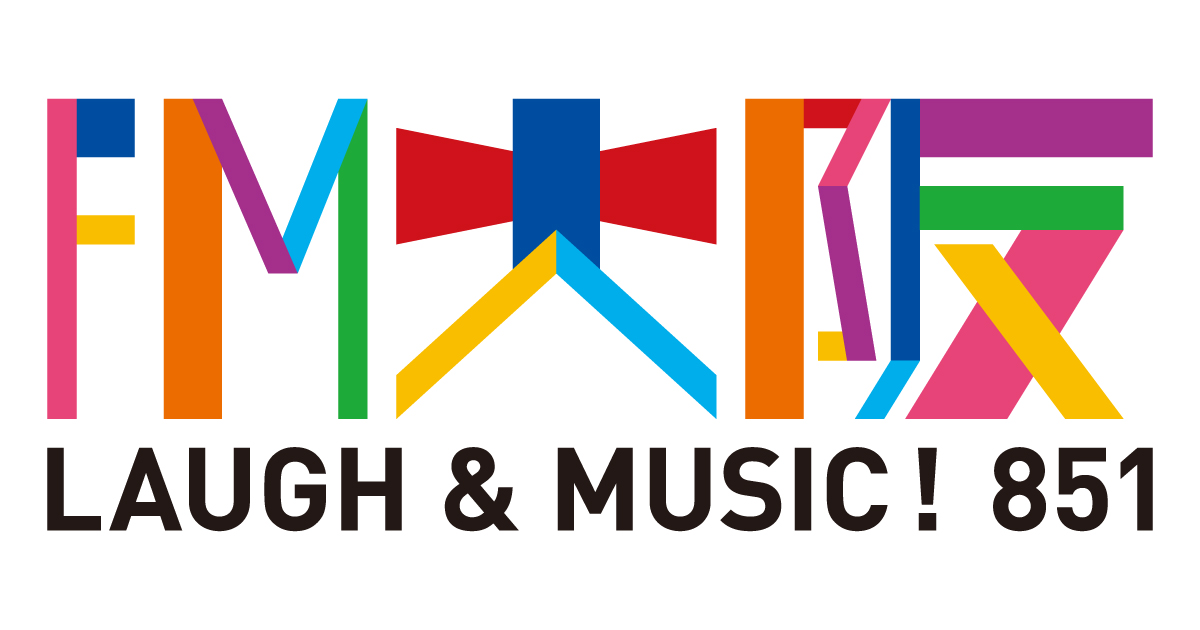

Minato-ku, Osaka; Japan
- Broadcast area: Osaka Prefecture
- Frequency: 85.1 MHz
- Branding: FM Osaka

Programming
- Language: Japanese
- Format: Full service–contemporary hit radio–J-Pop
- Affiliations: Japan FM Network

Ownership
- Owner: FM Osaka Co., Ltd.

History
- First air date: 1 April 1970; 54 years ago

Technical information
- Licensing authority: MIC
- Power: 10,000 watts
- ERP: 25,000 watts
- Translator(s): Nose 77.4 MHz

Links
- Website: www.fmosaka.net

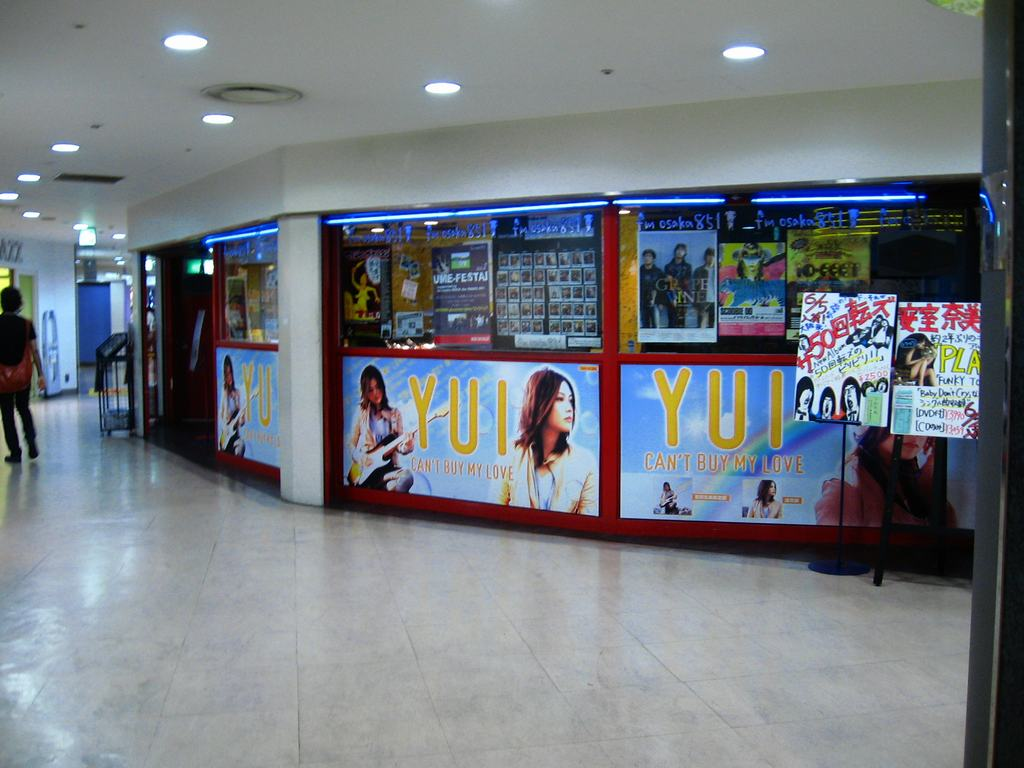
FM OSAKA Tower Station

FM Osaka (エフエム大阪) is an FM radio station in Osaka, Japan. The station is an affiliate of Japan FM Network (JFN).

FM Osaka started broadcasting on April 1, 1970. It was the second commercial FM radio station to launch in Japan after FM Aichi. During its early years, FM Osaka transmitted from Mount Ikoma but later moved to Mount Iimori in June 1971, increasing its reception by 30%.

FM Osaka's main studios are located at "Minatomachi River Place" in Minato, Naniwa, Osaka, in use since July 22, 2002. Its previous studios was at the Asahi Shimbun Osaka Headquarters building in Nakanoshima.

It was one of the thirteen commercial radio stations that took part in the pilot project that would become Radiko in 2010.

== See also ==
- List of radio stations in Japan
- aiko - one of FM Osaka's disc jockeys, started as a DJ before her singing career.
