= FM Haro! =

Japanese radio station

FM Haro! (JOZZ6AB-FM, 76.1 MHz) is an FM radio station based in Hamamatsu, Shizuoka, Japan. It is the seventh "community FM radio station" opened in Japan. Broadcasting area is roughly bounded by Kikugawa, Shizuoka and Omaezaki, Shizuoka in the east, and Toyohashi, Aichi and Shinshiro, Aichi in the west. It operates 24 hours a day, seven days a week, but more than a half of the programming is re-broadcasting of J-Wave and MUSIC BIRD.

== History ==
FM Haro! started broadcasting in Hamamatsu as a mini FM radio station with a low output power to qualify as a community FM radio station. It increased the output power to 20 watts in 2000 and moved the antenna to Act Tower, the tallest building in Hamamatsu, in April 2004, resulting in much wider broadcasting area.

== Features ==
- The concept of the station is "navigating the comfortable life in the area." The majority of the programs target ages between 20s and 40s.
- The station broadcast a Jubilo Iwata's soccer game (J-League away game), rugby (the top league away/home game) concerning the tournament.
- FM Haro! interchanges programs with FM Toyohashi in Toyohashi, Aichi and Iida FM in Iida, Nagano.
