= FM Akita =

JOPU-FM

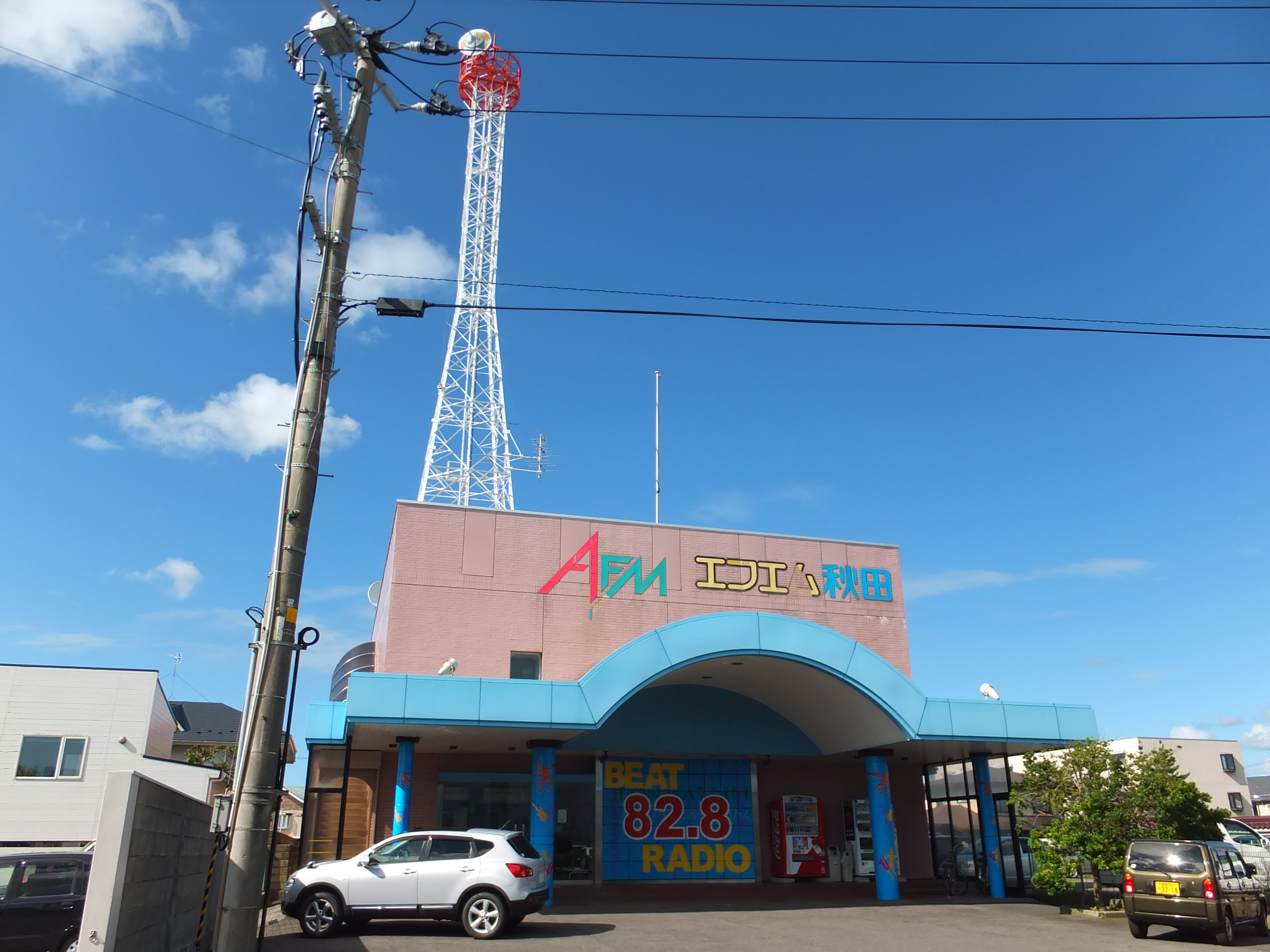
- Akita; Japan
- Broadcast area: Akita Prefecture
- Frequency: 82.8 MHz
- Branding: FM Akita

Programming
- Language: Japanese
- Format: Music/News/Talk
- Affiliations: Japan FM Network

Ownership
- Owner: FM Akita Co., Ltd.

History
- First air date: July 18, 1984

Technical information
- Licensing authority: MIC
- ERP: 16,000 Watts
- Transmitter coordinates: 39°39′56.7″N 140°04′24.5″E

Links
- Website: Official website

FM Akita Co., Ltd. (株式会社エフエム秋田, Kabushiki-gaisha FM Akita) is a Japanese FM station, an affiliate of the Japan FM Network. Their headquarters are located in Akita Prefecture.
