= Tokyo FM =

Contemporary hit radio station in Tokyo

Tokyo FM Broadcasting Co., Ltd.
- Logo used since 2020

- Headquarters in Chiyoda, Tokyo
- Native name: 株式会社エフエム東京
- Romanized name: Kabushiki-gaisha Efu Emu Tōkyō
- Type: Private KK
- Industry: Media
- Founded: March 17, 1970; 56 years ago
- Headquarters: Kōjimachi, Chiyoda, Tokyo, Japan
- Key people: Natsui Karashima (president and CEO)
- Services: Radio network
- Owner: (As of March 31, 2015); Tokai University (10.22%); Nippon Television City Corp. (7.28%); Dai Nippon Printing (4.98%); Mizuho Bank (4.94%); Yomiuri Shimbun (4.88%); Panasonic (4.88%); Hokuriku University (4.44%); NEC (4.00%); JTSB investment trusts (3.33%); Mizuho Capital (2.89%)
- Website: TFM

JOAU-FM
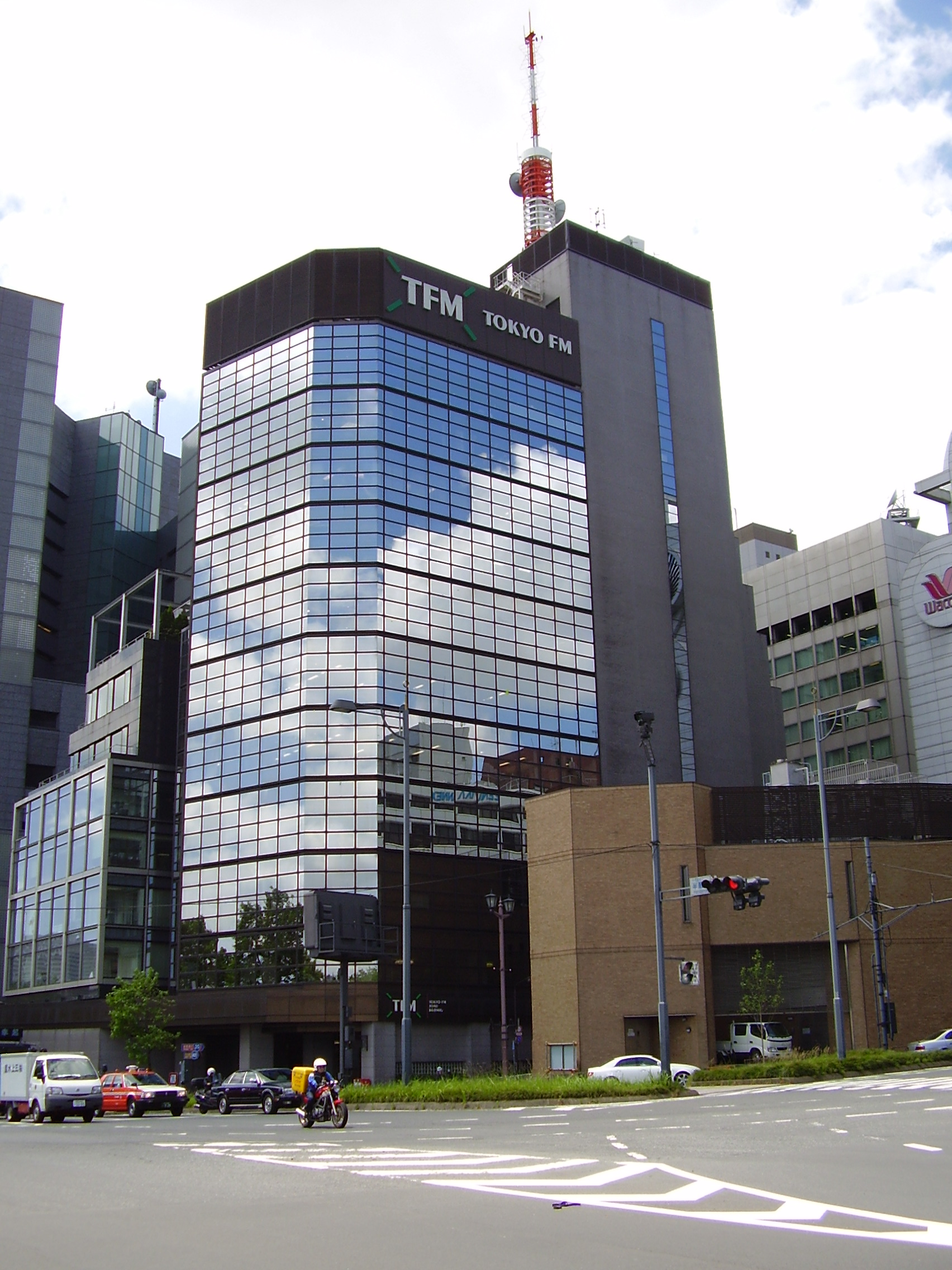
- Tokyo; Japan
- Broadcast area: Greater Tokyo
- Frequency: 80.0 MHz
- Branding: Tokyo FM

Programming
- Language: Japanese
- Format: Contemporary hit radio
- Affiliations: Japan FM Network

Ownership
- Owner: Tokyo FM Broadcasting Co., Ltd.
- Sister stations: InterFM (Since 2020)

History
- First air date: April 26, 1970; 56 years ago

Technical information
- Licensing authority: MIC
- Power: 10,000 watts
- ERP: 125,000 watts
- HAAT: 307.5 meters
- Transmitter coordinates: 35°39′31.01″N 139°44′43.52″E

Links
- Webcast: Radiko.jp/#FMT

Tokyo FM Broadcasting Co., Ltd. (株式会社エフエム東京, Kabushiki gaisha Efu Emu Tōkyō) (abbreviation:TFM) is a radio station in Chiyoda, Tokyo, Japan. It is the flagship station of the Japan FM Network (JFN).

== History ==
The station's forerunner, FM Tokai (FM東海, abbreviated FMT), owned by Tokai University, was launched on May 1, 1960 as an experimental station (call sign at the time of founding in 1958 JS2AO, changed in 1960 to JS2H. This station closed on April 25, 1970, replaced the next day by Tokyo FM, Japan's third commercial FM-radio broadcaster, after FM Aichi and FM Osaka. In 1985, the station's headquarters moved from the Kokusai-Tsushin Center (later KDD, now KDDI) buildings in Nishi-Shinjuku, where they had been since 1974, to the current location, Koujimachi in Chiyoda ward. The TOKYO FM Midtown Studio, a satellite studio, was closed down on January 15, 2017.

On September 18, 2026, Tokyo FM announced that it will cease operations of the Emergency Warning Broadcast System on the 30th, stating that it will continue to provide listeners with disaster information even after the operation has ended.

== Broadcasting ==
JOAU-FM broadcasts at a frequency of 80.0 MHz from the Tokyo Tower.

Rebroadcasters of JOAU-FM
City of licence	Identifier	Frequency	Power
Niijima	N/A	76.7 MHz	100 watts
Hachijo	N/A	84.3 MHz	10 watts
Ōme	N/A	83.6 MHz	20 watts
Hachioji	N/A	80.5 MHz	10 watts
Hinohara	N/A	86.6 MHz	300 watts

== Programs ==
- Countdown Station (simulcast over all JFN Stations)
  - Zen-Noh presents Countdown JP
  - COSMO presents Pop's Best 10
  - LAWSON presents SOUND IN MY LIFE
- Tatsuro Yamashita presents Rakuten Card Sunday Song Book
- Suzuki Talking FM (hosted by Masaharu Fukuyama)
- morinaga presents Ayaka Hirahara Healing Venus (simulcast over FM OSAKA and FM AICHI(@fm))
- Atsuko Maeda's Heart Songs
- Oto, Okashi (hosted by Yoohei Kawakami)
- School of Lock! (simulcast over all JFN Stations)
- J1 League FAN-SHOW with Deloitte
- Soccer Arena with Weiß Schwarz and Unisys
