= NBC (disambiguation) =

NBC is the National Broadcasting Company, a radio and television network in the United States.

NBC or nbc may also refer to:

== Arts, media, and entertainment ==
=== Broadcasting ===
- NBC Radio Network, a defunct American radio network
  - NBC Blue Network, a defunct American radio network
- National Broadcasting Corporation of Papua New Guinea
  - NBC Television, another name for National Television Service, a television channel in Papua New Guinea
- Namibian Broadcasting Corporation, Namibia
- Nation Broadcasting Corporation, Philippines
- Newfoundland Broadcasting Company, Canada, now CJON-DT
- Nagasaki Broadcasting, Japan
  - NBC Radio Saga, Japan

=== Filmography ===
- The Nightmare Before Christmas, a 1993 film by Henry Selick and Tim Burton

=== Ensembles ===
- National Ballet of Canada, a dance group

== Commerce ==
- National Bank of Cambodia, the Cambodian central bank
- National Bank of Canada, a financial institution
- National Bank of Commerce (disambiguation), various banks
- National Bedding Company, a mattress manufacturer
- National Bearings Company (now NBC Bearings), an Indian bearings manufacturer

== Government ==
- National Biosecurity Committee, a government body managing aspects of biosecurity in Australia
- National Book Council, a Maltese public entity dedicated to the promotion of Maltese literature and the book industry in Malta
- National Business Center, a part of the Department of the Interior of the United States
- Naval Base Coronado, a U.S. Navy base

== Religion ==
- National Baptist Convention (disambiguation), various church denominations
- Nazarene Bible College, a school

== Sports ==
- National Baseball Congress, an American semi-pro baseball tournament
- National Basketball Conference, a former basketball league in the Philippines
- National Billiard Council, now Billiard Congress of America
- Nippon Bass Club, a fishing organization in Japan
- Nürnberger Basketball Club, a professional basketball club from Nuremberg, Germany

== Transportation ==
- Toyota NBC platform, a car platform introduced in January 1999 by the Japanese automaker Toyota
- National Bus Company (UK), a bus operator in the United Kingdom between 1969 and 1988
- New Beckenham railway station, London, England (National Rail code: NBC)
- Begishevo Airport, Tatarstan, Russia (IATA code: NBC)

== Other uses ==
- Neotropical Bird Club, a British-based ornithological and birdwatching club
- Naturalis Biodiversity Center, a Dutch natural history museum and research center
- Next Byte Codes, a programming language
- Nuclear, Biological, Chemical, a military term
  - NBC suit, a type of military personal protective equipment
  - Weapon of mass destruction, a weapon that can kill many people or cause great damage
- Chang language (ISO 639-3 code: nbc)
- The Night Before Christmas, an alternative title of the 1823 poem A Visit from St. Nicholas by Clement Clarke Moore
