= National Primitive Baptist Convention of the U.S.A. =

Group of Black Primitive Baptists

The National Primitive Baptist Convention, USA is a group of Black Primitive Baptists that has adopted progressive methods and policies not in keeping with the historical and theological background of Primitive Baptists in general. The Convention was organized in Huntsville, Alabama in 1907. These churches have adopted the use of instrumental music, Sunday Schools, revivals and church auxiliaries. The idea of a national convention is itself foreign to standard Primitive Baptist concepts. They still adhere the Calvinistic or Predestinarian teachings held by other Primitive Baptists, but in a more progressive manner and are similar to the black National Baptist Conventions. The NPBC churches continue with Primitive Baptist usage in retaining the observance of feet washing as an ordinance of the church, and in calling their ministers "elder." These churches are not in fellowship with the remaining "old school" white Primitive Baptists. Most of the National Primitive Baptist Convention churches (616 in 1995) are located in the southern United States.

== Sources ==
- Baptists Around the World, by Albert W. Wardin, Jr.
- Dictionary of Baptists in America, Bill J. Leonard, editor
- Handbook of Denominations, by Frank S. Mead, Samuel Hill, & Craig D. Atwood
