= 90.8 FM =

FM radio frequency

The following radio stations broadcast on FM frequency 90.8 MHz:

== China ==
- CNR Business Radio in Meizhou

== Indonesia ==
- OZ Radio in Jakarta

== Israel ==
- Kan Moreshet in Beersheba, the Galilee Panhandle, Gush Dan, Jerusalem, the Jordan Rift Valley and Negev

== Japan ==
- Radio Fukushima in Fukushima
- Radio Fukushima in Koriyama, Fukushima
- RKC Radio in Kochi

== Malaysia ==
- TraXX FM in Jeli, Kelantan

== Turkey ==
- Super FM in Ankara, Istanbul, İzmir and Bursa
- Radyo 3 in Karaman
