= Fukui Broadcasting =

Radio and television station in Fukui Prefecture, Japan

Fukui Broadcasting Corporation
- Logo used since 2014

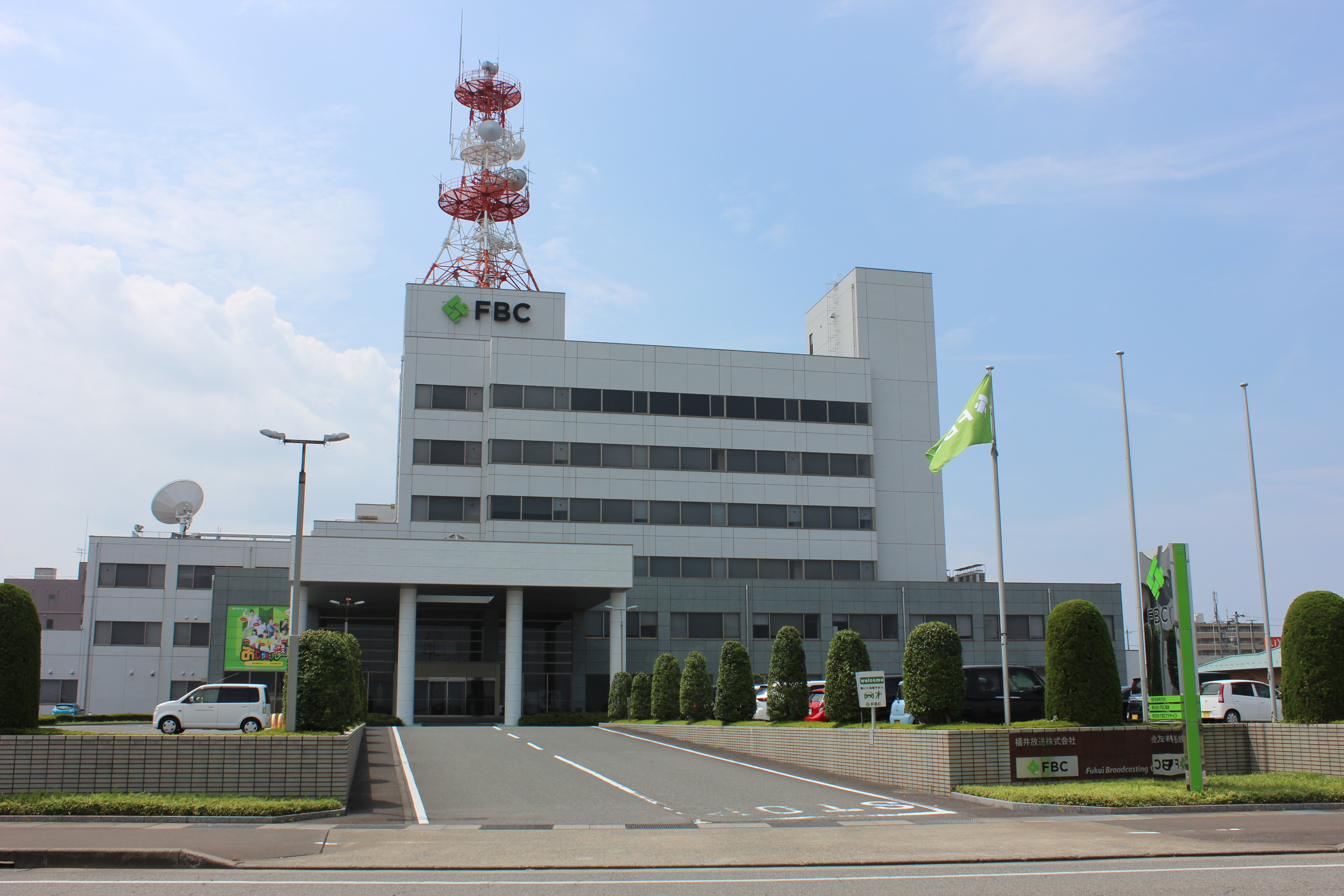
- Trade name: FBC
- Native name: 福井放送株式会社
- Romanized name: Fukui Hōsō Kabushikigaisha
- Company type: Business corporation
- Industry: Radio and Television network
- Founded: March 6, 1952
- Headquarters: 2-510 Ohwada, Fukui City, Fukui, Japan
- Key people: Akihiko Ikeuchi (President and CEO)
- Owner: Kato Build (36.00%); Nippon Television Network Corporation (9.27%); The Asahi Shimbun Company (8.91%)
- Number of employees: 113 (2019)
- Website: www.fbc.jp
- Footnotes / references Data from its Company Profile

JOPR
- Fukui City; Japan
- Broadcast area: Fukui Prefecture
- Frequencies: 864 kHz (AM); 94.6 MHz (FM)
- Branding: FBC Radio

Programming
- Format: Talk, Sports
- Affiliations: JRN/NRN

History
- First air date: July 20, 1952

Technical information
- Power: 5 kW

JOPR-DTV
- Fukui Prefecture; Japan
- City: Fukui City
- Channels: Digital: 20 (UHF); Virtual: 7
- Branding: FBC Television; FBC TV

Programming
- Affiliations: Nippon News Network and Nippon Television Network System (primary); All-Nippon News Network (secondary; since April 1, 1989)

Ownership
- Owner: Fukui Broadcasting Corporation

History
- First air date: June 1, 1960
- Former call signs: JOPR-TV (1960–2011)
- Former channel numbers: Analog: 11 (VHF, 1960–2011)

Technical information
- Licensing authority: MIC

Fukui Broadcasting Corporation (福井放送株式会社, Fukui Hōsō Kabushikigaisha; FBC) is a Japanese regional broadcaster based in Fukui City, Fukui Prefecture. The company's radio division, FBC Radio, callsign JOPR serves as an affiliate of the Japan Radio Network and the National Radio Network while their television division, FBC Television, callsign JOPR-DTV (channel 7) serves as a primary affiliate of the Nippon News Network and the Nippon Television Network System and has a secondary affiliation with the All-Nippon News Network. Both stations serve said prefecture and their studios are located in the Ohwada ward of Fukui City.

== History ==
In 1949, a movement to enable the creation of a private radio station in Fukui Prefecture emerged. Following the 1950 approval of the Three Radio Laws (Radio Law, Broadcasting Law, and Radio Supervisory Committee Establishment Law), Fukui Broadcasting obtained a preliminary license on April 21, 1951, becoming one of the first 16 private radio licenses in Japan. On March 6, 1952, FBC was officially registered as a company At 11:30am on June 14, 1952, FBC held its first experimental broadcast. Test broadcasts followed on July 17. On July 20, full-time broadcasts began. In 1953, FBC, Hokuriku Broadcasting and Kitanihon Broadcasting formed the Hokuriku Broadcasting Alliance to strengthen their combined advertising business. Two and a half years after launching, the company reached zero net losses. In November 1957, it opened a relay station in Obama City, covering the Reinan region.

It filed a request for a television station in September 1955, obtaining the license on October 22, 1957. Originally, it planned to join the TBS network (which would form the Japan News Network in 1959) due to the ties it had with ABC on radio, but since MRO in Ishikawa Prefecture had already opted for the network, it chose Nippon Television in 1960. From May 25 to 31, 1960, the station conducted three test broadcasts a day. Television broadcasts began on June 1. On April 7, 1962, the Fukui Broadcasting Hall, built in front of the Fukui Station, opened, becoming its new headquarters. On July 22, 1962, FBC TV started airing its first color television programs, completing the conversion in May 1973. In its early years on television, FBC TV mainly produced news and current affairs programming, and in 1965, it won an award from the president of the Federation for Broadcasting and Television Reporting of the People's Broadcasting Association. In 1966, it joined the Nippon News Network as a charter affiliate and became in charge of news coverage in parts of Fukui and Ishikawa Prefectures. By 1972, its signal was received through 23 transmitting stations and covered virtually all of the prefecture.

It announced the building of new headquarters in 1975, which only began in 1980. The new FBC Hall was completed in October 1981. The radio unit moved on November 2 and the television unit on November 16. It has four floors above the ground and one below, with a total area of 10,852 square meters. It alongside Fukui Shimbun established the Fukui Cultural Center in 1982, which later became an important local cultural institution. Net profits surpassed six billion yen for the first time in 1985. In the same year, a new logo was introduced, and in 1989, it introduced satellite news gathering.

In 1994, the station obtained the triple crown (all-day (6am to midnight), golden time (7-10pm) and prime time (7-11pm)), by 1999, it had achieved this accolade for six consecutive years. In 1995, it joined the Japan Coastal Broadcasting Alliance, which was created by ten NNN stations in coastal areas. Net revenue surpassed eight billion yen in 1997. In 2000, it launched its official website.

As FBC did not continue holding on to the rights of its extant headquarters in 1998, it announced the creation of new headquarters in 1999, located at Ohwada Ward, Fukui City. It moved to the new premises in February 2001, being built by Toda Construction, Kihara Construction and Muranaka Construction. The building has six floors, is 34,7 meters high and has a total area of 11.140 square meters. On May 1, 2006, it started digital terrestrial broadcasting, the analog signal shut down on July 24, 2011. On January 1, 2014, the company unveiled its new logo. The symbol is based on the letter F for Fukui and the kanji "編".
