= NBC station =

NBC station(s) may refer to:

- Television stations affiliated with the NBC TV network in the United States:
  - List of NBC television affiliates (by U.S. state)
  - List of NBC television affiliates (table)
  - NBC Owned Television Stations, the group of NBC's owned and operated stations
- NBC PNG in Papua New Guinea
- Namibian Broadcasting Corporation in Namibia
- Nation Broadcasting Corporation in the Philippines
- Newfoundland Broadcasting Company in Canada, now CJON-DT
- Norwegian Broadcasting Corporation in Norway

== See also ==
- NBC (disambiguation)
