= National Bank of Commerce Building =

National Bank of Commerce Building may refer to:

- National Bank of Commerce Building (Paragould, Arkansas), listed on the National Register of Historic Places (NRHP)
- National Bank of Commerce Building (Kansas City, Missouri), also NRHP-listed
- One Commerce Square, Memphis, Tennessee, skyscraper built by National Bank of Commerce, also known as "NBC building"

== See also ==
- National Bank of Commerce (disambiguation)
