= Wakayama Broadcasting System =

Radio station in Wakayama Prefecture, Japan

JOVF
- Logo used since 1979

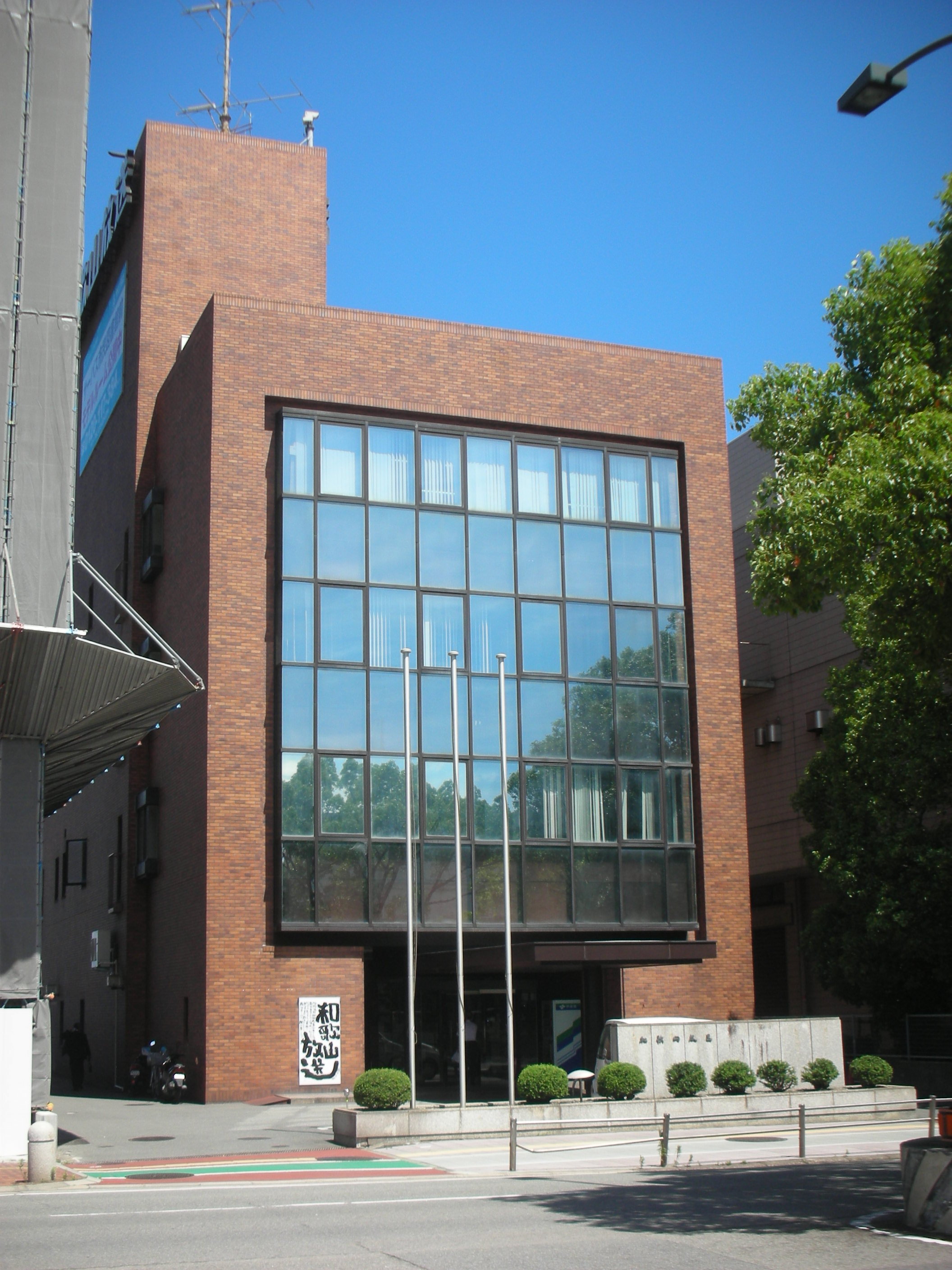
- Headquarters in Minatohonmachi, Wakayama

Wakayama, Wakayama Prefecture; Japan
- Broadcast area: Wakayama Prefecture
- Frequencies: 1431 kHz (AM); 94.2 MHz (FM)
- Branding: wbs Wakayama Broadcasting Radio

Programming
- Language: Japanese
- Affiliations: JRN, NRN

Ownership
- Owner: Wakayama Broadcasting System Co., Ltd.

History
- First air date: 1 April 1959; 66 years ago

Technical information
- Licensing authority: MIC
- Power: AM: 5 kW
- ERP: FM: 0.5 kW

Links
- Webcast: radiko.jp#!/live/WBS
- Website: www.wbs.co.jp

Wakayama Broadcasting System Co., Ltd. (株式会社和歌山放送, Kabushiki-gaisha Wakayama Hōsō; WBS, stylized in lowercase lettering as wbs, callsign JOVF) is a commercial radio station in Wakayama Prefecture. Launched in 1959 as the forty-first commercial radio station to operate in Japan, the station is an affiliate of both the Japan Radio Network and the National Radio Network. The station has a favorable relationship with the Mainichi Shimbun printing company, as its major shareholder, the Nankai Electric Railway company, also holds shares.

== History ==
The station started broadcasting at 5:30am on 1 April 1959 on 1560kc, from its building at Yoriyamachi number 15, with relay stations in Tanabe (800kc) and Shingu (1560kc). On 1 October 1959, the main station moved to 1400kc. The station then moved to 1430kc on 1 October 1962, adjusted to 1431KHz from 23 November 1978, when the Geneva frequency plan for AM radio was put in place.

Initially abbreviated as WBC (Wakayama Broadcasting Company), it was changed to the current WBS along with its relocation to its current premises at a four-floor building at 3-3 Minatohonmachi.

The station was one of the few in Japan to employ AM stereo broadcasting.

The station received its first request for an FM transmitting station to carry a "wide FM" simulcast on 22 December 2015, with the first license being for the Kainan transmitter.

On 19 February 2016, provisional licenses for two further transmitters (Gobo and Tanabe) were issued, with regular broadcasts beginning on 30 May, on 94.2 MHz. On 22 December, it received provisional licenses for three further transmitters (Shingo, Kudoyama and Kushimoto).

WBS held a wine sale event in 2023 to help revitalize the local economy, by setting up pop-up wine stores in Tokyo and Osaka. Both the economy of the prefecture and the station have been facing difficult times, and the event helped increase the station's sustainability. Following the attempted assassination of Fumio Kishida on 15 April 2023, WBS won the Excellence Award for the radio coverage in the 2023 News Parade Awards, alongside RCC (G7 summit in Hiroshima) and Nippon Cultural Broadcasting (garrison in Ishigaki, in Okinawa).
