= Hokkaido Broadcasting =

Japanese regional radio and television network

Hokkaido Broadcasting Co., Ltd.
- Logo used since 2001

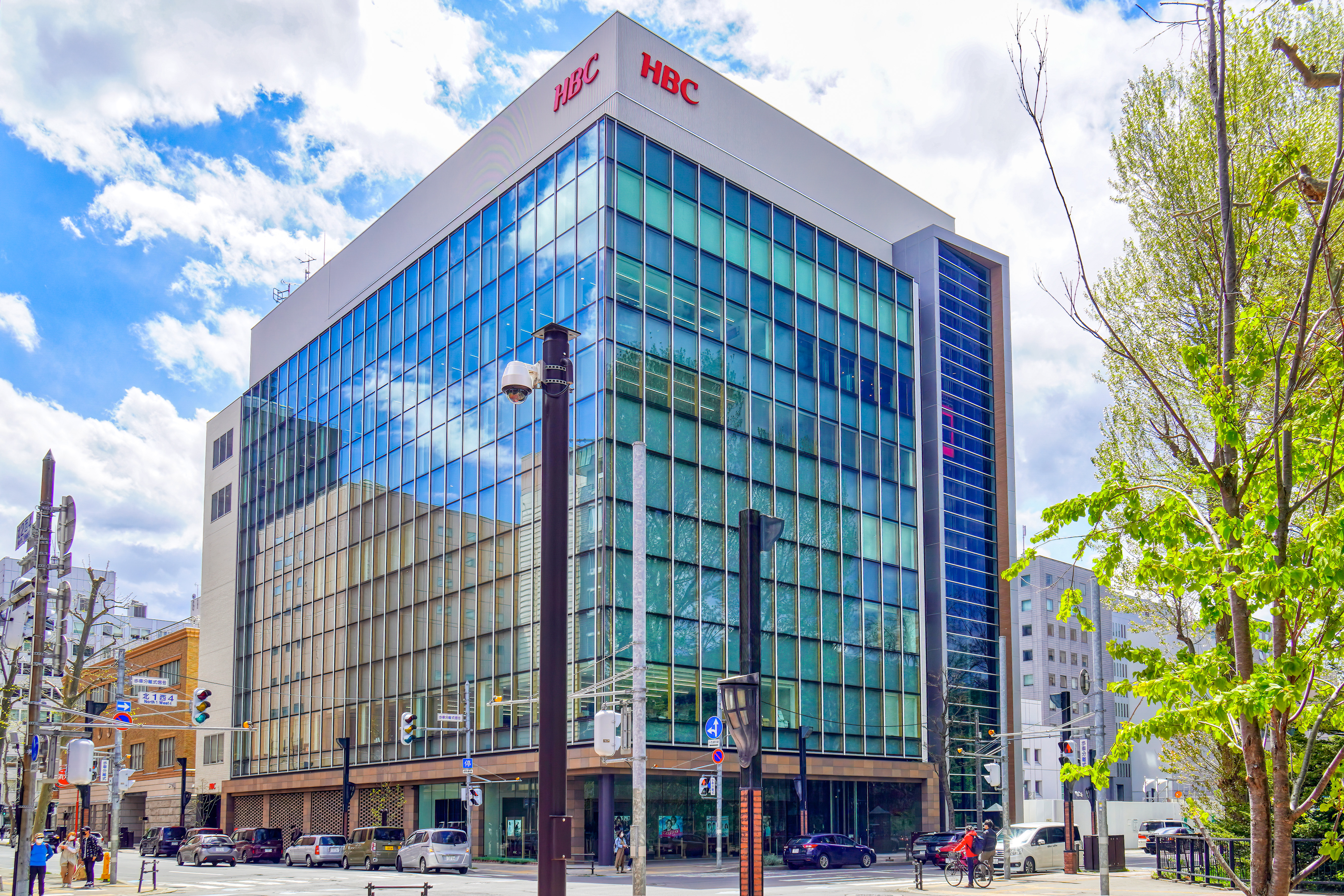
- Headquarters in Chūō-ku, Sapporo
- Trade name: HBC
- Native name: 北海道放送株式会社
- Romanized name: Hokkaido Hōsō Kabushiki-gaisha
- Type: Kabushiki gaisha
- Industry: Media
- Founded: November 30, 1951; 74 years ago
- Headquarters: 5-2, Kita 1 Jonishi, Chūō-ku, Sapporo, Ishikari Subprefecture, Hokkaido, Japan
- Key people: Naoki Katsuta (President and CEO); Taku Watanabe (Chairman and Representative Director)
- Website: hbc.co.jp

JOHR
- Sapporo; Japan
- Broadcast area: Hokkaido
- Frequencies: 1287 kHz (AM); 91.5 MHz (FM)
- Branding: HBC Radio

Programming
- Language: Japanese
- Format: Talk, Sports
- Affiliations: JRN/NRN

History
- First air date: March 10, 1952
- Call sign meaning: JO Hokkaido Radio

Technical information
- Licensing authority: MIC

Links
- Website: hbc.co.jp/radio

JOHR-DTV
- Hokkaido; Japan
- City: Sapporo
- Channels: Digital: 19 (UHF); Virtual: 1
- Branding: HBC Television

Programming
- Language: Japanese
- Affiliations: Japan News Network

Ownership
- Owner: Hokkaido Broadcasting Co., Ltd.

History
- First air date: April 1, 1957
- Former call signs: JOHR-TV (1957–2011)
- Former channel numbers: 1 (analog VHF, 1957–2011)
- Former affiliations: NTV (April 1, 1957 – December 30, 1959); NET/ANN (August 1, 1959 – March 30, 1975)

Technical information
- Licensing authority: MIC

Links
- Website: www.hbc.co.jp/tv

Hokkaido Broadcasting Co., Ltd (Japanese: 北海道放送株式会社, Hepburn: Hokkaido Hōsō Kabushiki-gaisha; HBC), is a Japanese broadcast network affiliated with the Japan News Network (JNN), Japan Radio Network (JRN) and National Radio Network (NRN). Their headquarters are located in Sapporo, Hokkaido Prefecture.

HBC was established on November 30, 1951; radio broadcasts officially commenced on March 10, 1952 and TV broadcasts commenced on April 1, 1957, as the first commercial television station in Hokkaido.

For its radio division, despite affiliated with JRN and NRN, HBC is the only JRN affiliate in Hokkaido, as well as its core station in the prefecture, but also airs NRN programs that are not aired by its fellow NRN core affiliate, STVradio.

== History ==
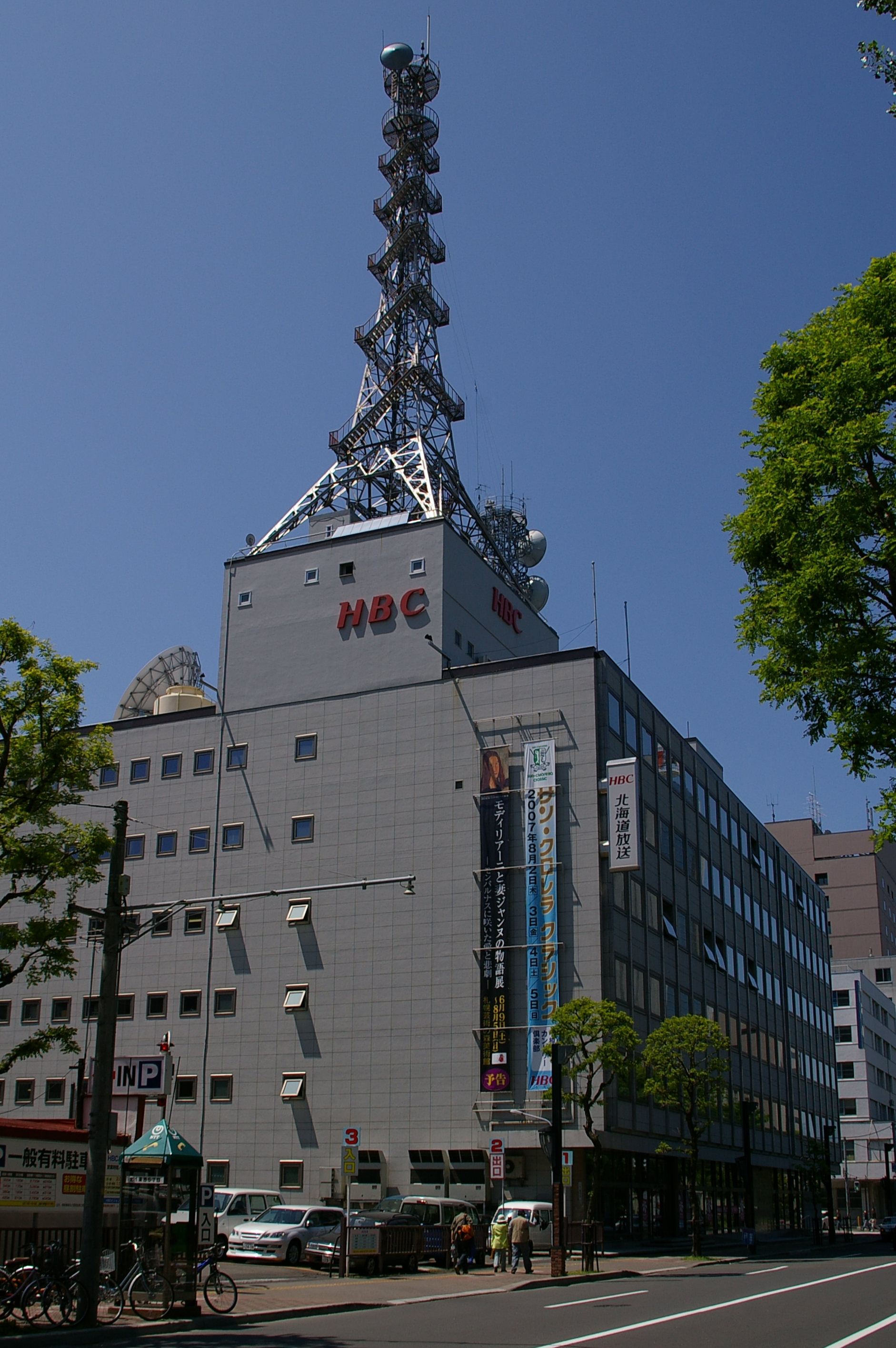
Former headquarters Since August 1, 1959 until September 20, 2020 (for radio) and October 11, 2020 (for TV)

After the passage of the Three Radio Acts (Radio Act, Broadcasting Act, and Act on the Establishment of Radio Supervisory Board) in 1950, there was a movement to apply for the establishment of private broadcasting in Hokkaido. On April 21, 1951, Hokkaido Broadcasting was granted the preparatory license and became one of the first 16 private broadcasters to receive a broadcasting license. On November 30 of the same year, Hokkaido Broadcasting was officially registered as a company with its headquarters in the Daimaru Building (which was the headquarters for the wholesale company, Daimaru Corporation).

On March 10 of the following year, HBC started radio broadcasting operating for at least 16 hours every day (06:00 to 22:30).

In 1953, Hokkaido Broadcasting began to apply for a TV broadcasting license. In July 1954, Hokkaido Broadcasting tried to broadcast TV signals at the Hokuto Expo held in Hakodate City, becoming the second private TV station in Japan to broadcast TV signals. In the following year, Hokkaido Broadcasting also launched experimental TV broadcasting in Sapporo. In October 1956, the technicians of Hokkaido Broadcasting went to China to participate in the Japanese product exhibition held in Beijing, and conducted a three-week experimental TV broadcast in China. At the same time, Hokkaido Broadcasting decided not to participate in the construction of the Sapporo TV tower led by NHK, but to build a signal transmission tower on the top of Mount Teine. On November 29, 1956, Hokkaido Broadcasting obtained a TV preparatory license. The next day, Hokkaido Broadcasting completed the 36-meter-high iron tower built on the top of Mount Teine, which gave Hokkaido Broadcasting the largest single-signal station TV signal coverage in Japan at that time. At that time, the U.S. military stationed in Japan returned the right to use VHF channels 1 and 2. Hokkaido Broadcasting hoped to obtain channel 1, but NHK strongly opposed it. NHK believed that private TV stations should not use a channel number smaller than NHK (NHK was channel 3), and Hokkaido Broadcasting should use channel 4 instead. At Hokkaido Broadcasting's insistence, the postal ministry agreed to Hokkaido Broadcasting's use of channel 1. On March 1, 1957, Hokkaido Broadcasting began to broadcast test signals, and obtained a formal license on March 15. Relying on the height advantage of the Teineyama signal transmitting station, Hokkaido Broadcasting can cover about 90% of Hokkaido's area when it starts broadcasting. On March 23, Hokkaido Broadcasting began a trial broadcast.

On April 1, 1957, Hokkaido Broadcasting's television service officially launched, becoming Japan's first private TV station outside the three major metropolitan areas. Within five years of broadcasting, the Hokkaido Broadcasting and Television Department set up relay stations in Hakodate, Muroran, Asahikawa, and Kushiro, basically covering the entire territory of Hokkaido. In 1959, Hokkaido Broadcasting joined the JNN network and became a founding member of JNN. On March 22, 1962, the Hokkaido Broadcasting Union launched a 437-hour strike, which resulted in the inability of the Hokkaido Broadcasting TV department to broadcast programs since March 28. It was the longest strike in the history of private broadcasting in Japan.

In March 1966, Hokkaido Broadcasting began broadcasting color TV programs. Hokkaido Broadcasting fully rebroadcast the 1972 Sapporo Winter Olympics, and the accumulated broadcasting time ranked first among private TV stations. In the same year, Hokkaido Broadcasting became the fifth private broadcasting company in Japan to implement the two-day weekend system. In 1978, Hokkaido Broadcasting's turnover reached 10.701 billion yen, exceeding 10 billion yen for the first time.

From 1982 to 1991, Hokkaido Broadcasting has won the all-time ratings war for 10 consecutive years. In 1984, Hokkaido Broadcasting won the triple crown of ratings, which was the first time a TV station in Hokkaido has made this achievement. But after the mid-1980s, as the ratings of Hokkaido Cultural Broadcasting and Sapporo TV increased significantly one after another, the ratings of Hokkaido Broadcasting were surpassed by the former two TV stations. Hokkaido Broadcasting is also actively involved in cultural undertakings. In 1997, Hokkaido Broadcasting hosted the Sapporo performance of the Vienna Philharmonic.

In April 1996, Hokkaido Broadcasting opened its official website. In order to save costs, Hokkaido Broadcasting consolidated its program broadcasting areas outside of Sapporo into four areas: Donan (Hakodate, Muroran), Dohoku (Asahikawa, Kitami), Kushiro, and Obihiro in 1997. In 1998, Hokkaido Broadcasting launched the mascot Monsuke with a monkey as the design concept. At the turn of the century, Hokkaido Broadcasting's ratings rebounded. In 2001, the 50th anniversary of the founding, Hokkaido Broadcasting launched a new wordmark. This year, Hokkaido Broadcasting won the second place alone in the prime-time ratings after 12 years. On June 1, 2006, Hokkaido Broadcasting began to broadcast digital TV signals, and stopped broadcasting analog TV signals on July 24, 2011.

In 2021, all broadcasters in Japan will be transitioning their radio services from AM broadcasting to FM broadcasting to alleviate the burden of costs in operating 2 different frequencies. Due to vast, sparsely populated areas, where AM signals propagate properly than FM signals, as well as the costly expenses for establishing a brand-new Wide FM transmitter, Hokkaido Broadcasting, its rival STVradio, and JRN/NRN affiliate Akita Broadcasting in Akita will not participate in the transition from AM to FM.
