= Hokuriku Broadcasting =

Hokuriku Broadcasting Co., Ltd.
- Logo used since 2022

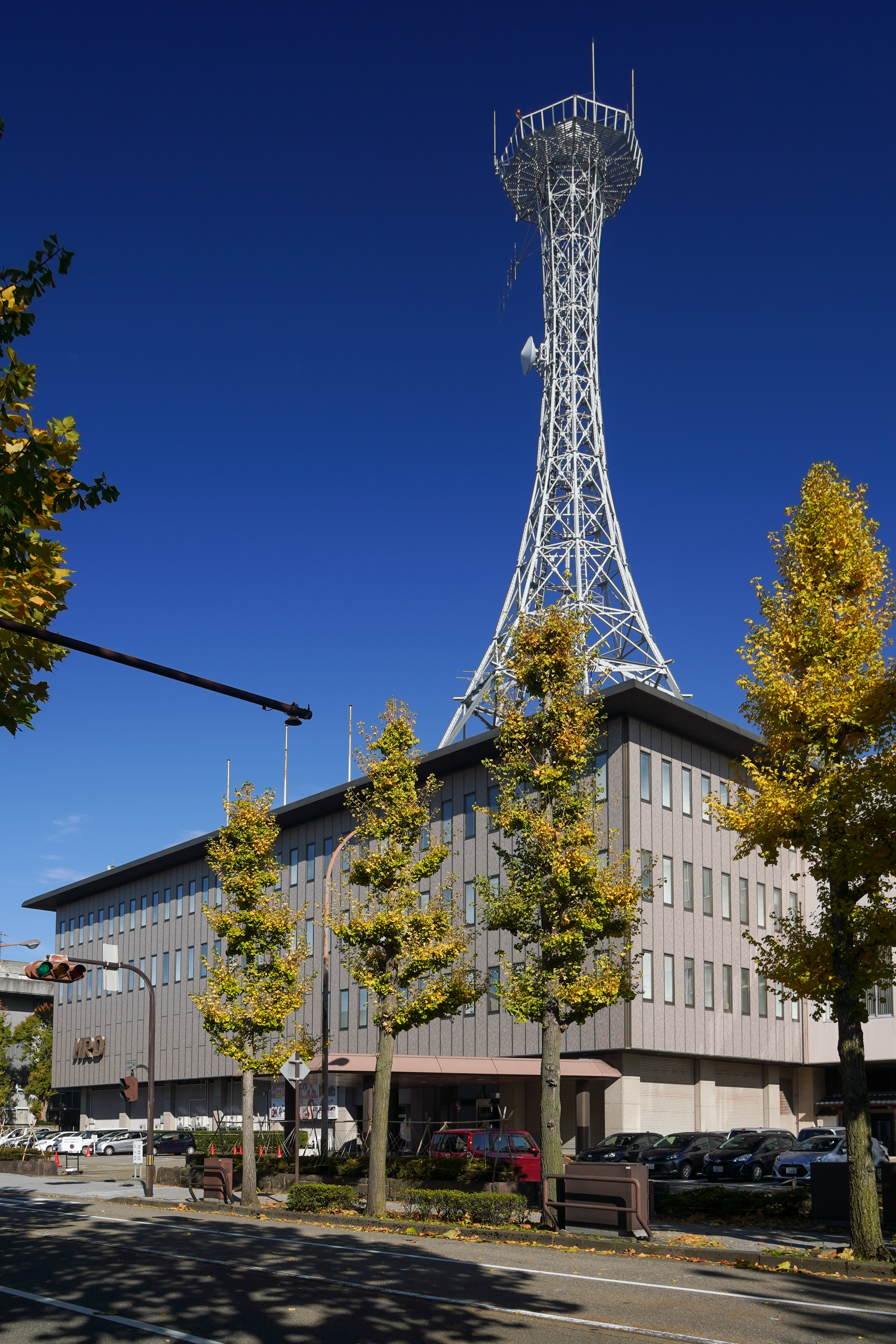
- Headquarters in Hondamachi, Kanazawa.
- Trade name: MRO
- Native name: 北陸放送株式会社
- Romanized name: Hokurikuhōsō kabushiki kaisha
- Type: Kabushiki gaisha
- Industry: Television and radio broadcasting
- Founded: December 24, 1951; 74 years ago
- Headquarters: 3-2-1 Hondamachi, Kanazawa City, Ishikawa Prefecture, Japan
- Key people: Toru Yoshifuji (President and CEO)
- Website: www.mro.co.jp
- Footnotes; Data from its Corporate Profile

JOMR JOMO (defunct)
- Kanazawa; Japan
- Broadcast area: Ishikawa Prefecture
- Frequencies: 1107 kHz (AM); 94.0 MHz (FM)
- Branding: MRO Radio

Programming
- Language: Japanese
- Format: Talk; Sports
- Affiliations: JRN/NRN

Ownership
- Owner: Hokuriku Broadcasting Co., Ltd. (Pending transfer of license to spin-off company, MRO Radio Co. Ltd.)

History
- First air date: May 10, 1952; 74 years ago

Technical information
- Licensing authority: MIC
- Power: 5 kW (AM); 1 kW (FM)

JOMR-DTV
- Ishikawa Prefecture; Japan
- City: Kanazawa
- Channels: Digital: 14 (UHF); Virtual: 6
- Branding: MRO Television

Programming
- Language: Japanese
- Affiliations: Japan News Network

Ownership
- Owner: Hokuriku Broadcasting Co., Ltd.

History
- First air date: December 1, 1958; 67 years ago
- Former call signs: JOMR-TV (1958-2011)
- Former channel numbers: Analog: 6 (VHF, 1958–2011)

Technical information
- Licensing authority: MIC

Hokuriku Broadcasting Co., Ltd. (北陸放送株式会社, Hokuriku Hōsō Kabushiki-gaisha), also known as MRO, is a Japanese broadcast network affiliated with the Japan News Network (JNN) for television, and the Japan Radio Network (JRN) for radio. Their headquarters is located in the city of Kanazawa, Ishikawa Prefecture.

The "MRO" abbreviation is taken from the last letters of the call signs "JOMR" and "JOMO" of the Kanazawa and Nanao broadcasting stations, respectively. JOMO is no longer operational.

Since Fukui Prefecture doesn't have a JNN of its own, Hokuriku Broadcasting is the network's default affiliate in the said prefecture. In terms of news gathering, both MRO and JNN key station CBC Television, in some cases, handles the prefecture's Reihoku region and Tsuruga City in the Reinan region, while the rest of the Reinan region is handled by JNN key station Mainichi Broadcasting through its Kyoto Branch.

Hokuriku Broadcasting has branch offices in Tokyo, Osaka, and Nagoya, as well as a branch office in Toyama, despite the presence of fellow JNN station Tulip Television already existed.

== History ==
=== Early history ===
On December 24, 1948, the Ishikawa Prefectural government applied for a license to operate a commercial broadcaster under the name Hokuriku Cultural Broadcasting, and was the fourth Japanese company to apply to operate a commercial broadcaster. This application was later rejected due to Supreme Commander for the Allied Powers' media censorship.

After the establishment of the "Three Radio Laws" (Radio Law, Broadcasting Law, and Radio Supervisory Committee Establishment Law) in 1950, multiple license to operate a commercial broadcasting applications appear in various parts of Japan. The local newspaper Hokkoku Shimbun in Ishikawa Prefecture revived its plans to operate a new broadcaster.On February 10, 1951, Hokkoku Shimbun took the lead and the founders meeting were held.In April 21 of the same year, the Ministry of Posts granted 16 of the broadcast licenses and Hokuriku Cultural Broadcasting was listed. However, the broadcast area is limited to Ishikawa Prefecture, and does not include Toyama and Fukui prefectures, which are within the scope of the application.

=== Start as radio broadcaster ===
Two test radio broadcasts were launched: on April 22, 1952, at 9 amand on May 1 of the same year.At 6 am on May 10, 1952, Hokuriku Cultural Broadcasting was officially launched, becoming the first commercial radio broadcaster along the Sea of Japan.The broadcaster was initially located in the 4th floor of the Marukoshi Department Store in Kanazawa City.

On November 28, 1956, Hokuriku Culture Broadcasting changed its company name to Hokuriku Broadcasting. In order to strengthen the advertising business, Hokuriku Broadcasting, together with Kitanihon Broadcasting and Fukui Broadcasting, formed the "Hokuriku Radio Alliance" on February 1, 1953, to increase income and reduce expenditure. Hokuriku Broadcasting achieved uninterrupted broadcasting throughout the day on May 1 of the same year, and achieved profit for the first time in June. In February 1954, Hokuriku Broadcasting realized its first stock dividend. At the end of 1955, Hokuriku Broadcasting set up a relay station in Nanao at the northern end of the Noto Peninsula, covering most of Ishikawa Prefecture. According to the first listening rate survey in November 1955, the listening rate of Hokuriku Broadcasting reached 56.8%, far exceeding the 39.3% of NHK Radio 1. Hokuriku Broadcasting changed the abbreviation from MR to MRO on January 1, 1956 (O is taken from the call sign JOMO of Nanao Broadcasting Bureau), and formulated a new trademark. On April 1 of the same year, Hokuriku Broadcasting began construction of a new headquarters in Takaoka-cho (now Korinbo), Kanazawa City. The building has five floors above ground and one floor underground, and was completed on December 7 of the same year.

=== Jump to television ===
Hokuriku Broadcasting applied for a TV broadcasting license on August 31, 1953. On October 22, 1957, Hokuriku Broadcasting obtained a TV pre-broadcast license. At 8:10 p.m. on November 6 of the following year, Hokuriku Broadcasting launched a TV test signal. On November 15, Hokuriku Broadcasting obtained the official TV broadcasting license. At 6:00 p.m on November 17, Hokuriku Broadcasting began to broadcast TV programs.

At 11 a.m. on December 1, 1958, Hokuriku Broadcasting officially began broadcasting TV programs, becoming the first commercial TV station on the coast of the Sea of Japan in Honshu. Shortly after Hokuriku Broadcasting started, TV began to spread rapidly due to the wedding of Crown Prince Akihito. In December 1960, the TV penetration rate in Ishikawa Prefecture reached 34.6%. At the same time, according to the first ratings survey in May 1959, the average weekly ratings of Hokuriku Broadcasting reached 40.1%, surpassing the 34.1% of NHK General TV. At the same time as Japan News Network was established, Hokuriku Broadcasting also became a founding member of JNN in August 1959. On August 2, 1960, the Hokuriku Broadcasting Union was established. Beginning in April 1962, Hokuriku Broadcasting began broadcasting educational programs for schoolchildren every Monday to Saturday morning. On July 22 of the same year, Hokuriku Broadcasting began broadcasting color TV. With the Nanao Broadcasting Bureau starting to broadcast TV signals in October 1962, the TV signals of Hokuriku Broadcasting were able to cover most of Ishikawa Prefecture.

MRO's 2nd logo, created in 1978. It became the logo for both TV and radio entities until 2022 when a new logo was unveiled in time for MRO's 70th anniversary. It also became a temporary alternate logo that same year until March 2025 when the station transitioned to the new logo on all platforms, and broadcasts.

The radio division of Hokuriku Broadcasting joined JRN in May 1965. In the mid-1960s, in response to the advertising competition plan caused by the opening of the new UHF station, Hokuriku Broadcasting and Kitanihon Broadcasting jointly proposed to the Hokuriku Radio Supervision Bureau in 1966 that the three prefectures of Hokuriku should be used as the same TV broadcasting area to expand the advertising market, but this idea failed to come true. To celebrate the 15th anniversary of its founding, Hokuriku Broadcasting published "Ishikawa Prefecture Folklore" in 1967, which included 484 ballads. In September 1967, Hokuriku Broadcasting began to build its third-generation headquarters Hokuriku Broadcasting Hall. In October of the following year, Hokuriku Broadcasting began to broadcast programs from the Hokuriku Broadcasting Hall. In August 1976, Hokuriku Broadcasting and Buffalo's WBEN-TV (now WIVB-TV) signed a sister station agreement.

In July 1997, Hokuriku Broadcasting was exposed to the problem of fewer advertisements. In the five years since 1992, Hokuriku broadcast less than 2,659 advertisements of 181 companies that should have been broadcast; this incident led to Hokuriku Broadcasting being suspended by the Japanese private broadcasting union for one year. In light of this, the Saga family, who had control over MRO, stepped down as a result of the investigation, allowing JNN flagship TBS, who also holds a share in Hokuriku Broadcasting, to place a president and other executives for the station. On July 1, 2006, Hokuriku Broadcasting began to broadcast digital TV signals. Hokuriku Broadcasting completely stopped broadcasting analog TV signals on July 24, 2011. On January 10, 2018, because the signal tower shared by Hokuriku Broadcasting and Ishikawa TV caught fire due to a lightning strike, the Kaga area and other places could not watch the programs of Hokuriku Broadcasting. Hokuriku Broadcasting set up a temporary antenna on January 18 to broadcast TV signals. On August 1 of the same year, the signal tower was completely repaired.

In 2022, Hokuriku Broadcasting has unveiled a new logo, commemorating the station's 70th anniversary. The "R" in the new MRO logo symbolizes the topography of the Ishikawa prefecture.

=== AM to FM transition and planned split ===
In 2021, in order to reduce costs in operating AM and FM stations (citing signal problems, aging AM transmitting equipment, and other factors), and also to improve or increase business efficiency and performance in terms of sales and advertisement, the Ministry of Communications announced that the transition from AM to FM will take place on 44 out of 47 prefectures, with a slow phasing out of AM master stations and relays starting in 2023, until the final phase of the transition to take place in fall 2028. MRO is one of 44 stations who have begun suspending AM operations on some of its relays since 2024, with the Nanao, Wajima, and Yamanaka relays already suspended for further experimentation with Wide FM broadcasting. Currently, MRO Radio can be heard in Nanao and Wajima on standard FM at 88.6MHz, and 77.1MHz respectively, while Yamanaka is served by the Main Kanazawa Wide FM frequency at 94.0MHz. The main Kanazawa AM station (JOMR, 1107 kHz) remains on the air, with plans for the station to become a full-fledged Wide FM station by 2028.

In the case of the Wajima AM relay, because of a power outage due to torrential rainfall within the Noto Peninsula, and also in order to provide disaster information, the said relay was reinstated for a brief period between the 21st of September to the 10th of November 2024.

Hokuriku Broadcasting is on the verge of splitting its television and radio properties by April 2027. The new spin-off preparatory company under the "MRO Radio Co. Ltd." name, which is established last April 1, 2026, will be taking over the radio license by the following year. In turn, the radio division will be converted into a subsidiary of the company. Also, Hokuriku Broadcasting are planning to move to a more modern facility for its radio and television operations by 2030, as the current building in Hondamachi, which was built in 1968, has showed signs of aging.
