= Nagasaki Broadcasting =

Radio and television broadcaster in Nagasaki Prefecture, Japan

Nagasaki Broadcasting Co., Ltd.
- Logo used since 2019

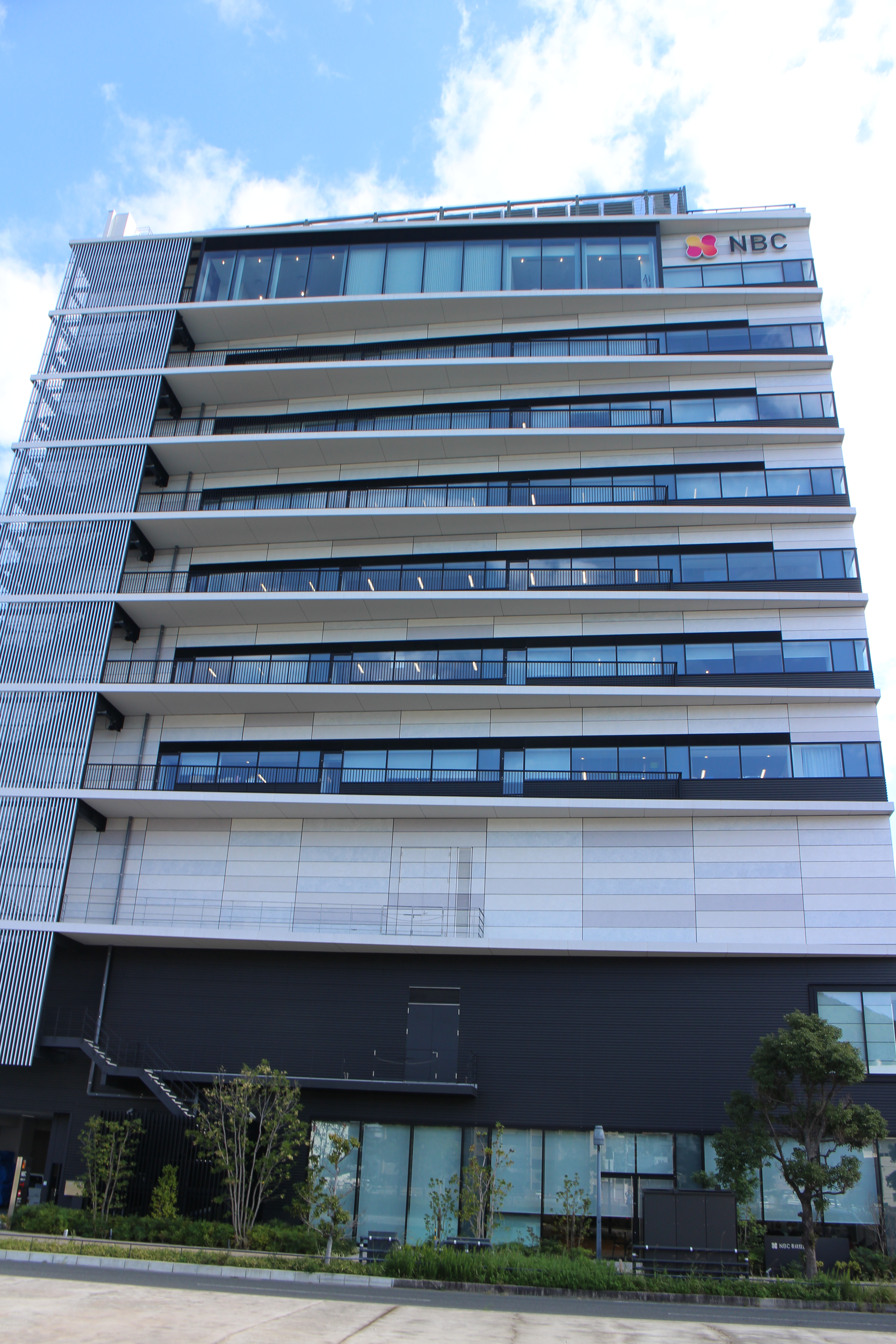
- Headquarters in Onoe-cho, Nagasaki
- Trade name: NBC
- Native name: 長崎放送株式会社
- Romanized name: Nagasakihōsō kabushikigaisha
- Type: Business corporation
- Industry: Radio and television network
- Founded: September 12, 1952; 74 years ago
- Headquarters: 5-6 Onoe-cho, Nagasaki City, Nagasaki Prefecture, Japan
- Website: www.nbc-nagasaki.co.jp
- Footnotes; Data from its Corporate Profile

JOUR
- Nagasaki; Japan
- Broadcast area: Nagasaki Prefecture
- Frequencies: 1233 kHz (AM); 92.6 MHz (FM)
- Branding: NBC Radio

Programming
- Language: Japanese
- Format: Talk, Sports
- Affiliations: JRN, NRN

Ownership
- Owner: Nagasaki Broadcasting Co., Ltd.

History
- First air date: March 1, 1953

Technical information
- Licensing authority: MIC
- Power: 5 kW

Links
- Website: www.nbc-nagasaki.co.jp/radio/

JOUR-DTV JOMF-TV (defunct)
- Nagasaki Prefecture; Japan
- City: Nagasaki
- Channels: Digital: 14 (UHF); Virtual: 3
- Branding: NBC Nagasaki Television

Programming
- Language: Japanese
- Affiliations: Japan News Network

Ownership
- Owner: Nagasaki Broadcasting Co., Ltd.

History
- First air date: January 1, 1959; February 20, 1959 (JOMF-TV)
- Last air date: July 24, 2011 (JOMF-TV)
- Former call signs: JOUR-TV; JOMF-TV (1959–2011)
- Former channel numbers: 5 (analog VHF, 1959–2011); JOMF-TV; 10 (analog VHF, 1959–2011)

Technical information
- Licensing authority: MIC

Links
- Website: www.nbc-nagasaki.co.jp/tv/

Nagasaki Broadcasting Co., Ltd. (長崎放送株式会社, Nagasaki Hōsō kabushiki gaisha), also known as NBC, is a broadcasting station in Nagasaki Prefecture, Japan. It founded in 1952, and it is the only commercial broadcasting that provides both TV and radio services in Nagasaki prefecture. Nagasaki Broadcasting is affiliated with the JNN (TV), JRN, NRN (RADIO).

Nagasaki Broadcasting started radio broadcasting in 1953. Its radio station also covers Saga Prefecture by means of a separate radio station (NBC Radio Saga). NBC started television broadcasting in 1959, and started digital terrestrial television broadcasting in 2006. In 2021, NBC moved into its new headquarter, and started to use new logo. This network has no correlation to the American broadcaster of the same name despite the identical abbreviations.

Nagasaki Broadcasting, like all Japanese TV stations, ended analog broadcasting on July 24, 2011, as it transitions into full-time digital broadcasting, which started in the early 2000s. The shut down also includes the Sasebo relay (JOMF-TV), which is now incorporated into the main NBC Nagasaki digital feed. While most of JNN's stations air on virtual channel "6" just like mother station, TBS, Nagasaki Broadcasting is one of 6 JNN stations that air their programs on virtual channel "3".

== History ==
logo used between 1959 and 2021

With the promulgation of the Three Radio Laws in 1950 (Radio Law, Broadcasting Law and Radio Supervisory Establishment Committee Law), two commercial radio stations in Nagasaki Prefecture, Nagasaki Peace Broadcasting (長崎平和放送) and Radio Nagasaki (ラジオ長崎) solicited a private broadcasting license. In October that year, the licenses were merged into Nagasaki Peace Broadcasting. A preliminary license was obtained in December 1951 and began preparations for its launch. On September 12, 1952, the company was officially registered with a capital of 12.5 million yen. The name was changed to Radio Nagasaki in December (the name of Nagasaki Peace Broadcasting's competing bid). On February 24, 1953, experimental broadcasts began, becoming regular on March 1.

Due to the large distance between Nagasaki, in the south of the prefecture, and Sasebo, in the north, as well as its mountainous terrain, it was near impossible for listeners in the north to pick up broadcasts from NBC. As consequence, local investors set up Radio Sasebo (ラジオ佐世保) in 1953, with the aim of obtaining a local license to operate. However, NBC was also interested in establishing a transmitting station there. With the "one station per prefecture" rule imposed by the regulator, a conflict between Radio Sasebo and NBC erupted, ending in 1954 with Radio Sasebo obtaining its license, while NBC would merge with it only after its broadcasts began. On April 1, 1954, Radio Sasebo began broadcasting, subsequently merging with NBC on October 1.

In 1957, NBC obtained profits for the first time, surpassing 100 billion yen. That same year, it obtained a broadcasting license in Saga Prefecture. This became Radio Saga (ラジオ佐賀), whose broadcasts started on August 1, 1958, later renamed NBC Radio Saga (NBCラジオ佐賀). With that, NBC became the only broadcaster in Japan to have licenses for two prefectures.

A preliminary television license was obtained in January 1956, to cover both Nagasaki and Sasebo. In order to begin television work, its capital was raised by 150 million yen in 1958. Test broadcasts started on December 24, 1958. On January 1, 1959, at 7am, NBC started television broadcasts to Nagasaki, while on February 20, it started broadcasts to Sasebo. With the rapid growth of television broadcasting and infrastructure, NBC moved to its current headquarters in 1961. The building has nine floors, one below ground and eight above, with a total area of 6,610 square meters. It cost 480 million yen and was concluded in June 1962. As a result, NBC moved away from the Nagasaki Chamber of Commerce and Industry and now had premises of its own. At launch in 1953, its revenue was of 47 million yen, rising to 222 million in 1958 and, in 1960, 229 million for radio and 341 million for television. In 1968, on the eves of the launch of KTN, its revenue was of 311 million yen for radio and 1,828 billion for television, totalling 2.145 billion combined, surpassing the two billion benchmark for the first time.

The station invited the Vienna Boys' Choir for a performance in Nagasaki in 1961. Beginning in 1962, it started television coverage of the Nagasaki Kunchi festival. In 1966, the station started broadcasting color programming. Up until KTN's launch (on April 1, 1969), NBC was the only private television station in the prefecture, airing programs from the commercial networks in Tokyo without facing competition. In 1977, revenue surpassed five billion yen; later, six billion yen in 1979.

In 1981, the station sold footage of Pope John Paul II's visit to Nagasaki to US network CBS. By 1983, NBC had more than 100 television transmitters, including in the remote island areas. Akira Takada started his own shopping program on NBC Radio in 1990; this gave impulse to what is now Japanet Takata, as in one of these broadcasts, it sold fifty cameras in five minutes. After the collapse of the bubble economy and the creation of NCC and NIB in the early 1990s, its operational environment faced serious challenges. In response, NBC issued a new plan in 2000 to reverse the high cost system. From 2001, it began holding the NBC Matsuri (NBCまつり) festival during summer, in an attempt to recover its corporate image.

The company celebrated its fiftieth anniversary. Events were held from June 2001 to March 2003, including lots of special programs. In 2003, it unveiled its new mascot, Nanman-kun. Digital terrestrial broadcasts began on December 1, 2006. In 2008, NBC Matsuri hit a new record, 65,000 attendees. Analog signals shut down on July 24, 2011.。

In January 2018, it announced that it would move to new headquarters to the west side of Nagasaki Station. It was concluded on July 30, 2021. On November 1, it started broadcasting from the new premises. In preparation for its 70th anniversary, NBC unveiled a new logo in 2021.。

== Radio ==
NBC Radio mainly produces news and information programs such as Hayaban!! Asakara! (早版!! あさかラ!) on weekday mornings, as well Asakara! (あさかラ!), Hirukara!MIX (ひるかラ!MIX) and NBC Radio The Charge (NBCラジオ ザ・チャージ!)。

NBC Radio joined radiko in 2012, enabling internet coverage of its programs.

=== NBC Sasebo Relay Station ===
When the plan to open Radio Sasebo was announced in Nagasaki Prefecture, the Ministry of Posts and Telecommunications (at that time) instructed the government to issue just "one station per prefecture", as in other prefectures. Though the call sign (JOMF) was issued, it was decided to merge after the station opened. With the opening of Radio Sasebo on April 1, 1954, there were temporarily two radio stations in the same prefecture. Six months later, in October 1954, Radio Nagasaki and Radio Sasebo merged. Radio Sasebo became Nagasaki Broadcasting Sasebo Broadcasting Station, but Radio Sasebo's call sign (JOMF) is still used in radio broadcasting (the Sasebo TV relay station gave up using the calls in the 1990s).

In Hamada-cho, Sasebo City, there used to be a three-story station building equipped with TV and radio studios, and even in terms of news coverage, there was a corner where the Sasebo station's own news was broadcast in the news program. In addition, as a parent station of NBC, it did not take the trouble of setting up a relay station, which had a positive effect on costs. There was a good balance of companies in the Nagasaki and Sasebo areas in the commercials as well. However, in the latter half of the 2000s, the Sasebo Broadcasting Station was reorganized into the Sasebo branch office due to a company-wide management review and deterioration of broadcasting equipment. The station building in Hamada-cho was closed and moved to an office building in Matsuura-cho. It seems that the site of the station building was sold to another company.

=== NBC Radio Saga ===
The reason why there is a broadcasting station in Saga is because there was no commercial radio station with a concert hall in Saga Prefecture. It was thought that there was no need to set up a commercial broadcasting station in Saga Prefecture because radio waves from private broadcasting stations in Fukuoka and Kumamoto could be reached (Saga TV, the first private broadcasting station in the prefecture, opened in 1969, and FM Saga opened in 1992 as a purely Saga prefectural station in terms of radio). NBC applied for the establishment of a relay station, noting that Nagasaki Prefecture and Saga Prefecture were in the same Hizen Province, and in 1958, NBC Radio Saga was established. News coverage in Saga Prefecture and the division of the Private Broadcasting Education Association are handled by Nagasaki Broadcasting (via NBC Radio Saga) for radio and RKB Mainichi Broadcasting for television.

== Television ==
Initially, NBC TV's news service was shown at 9pm every Sunday evening. In 1976, it started airing NBC News 6 (NBCニュース6). This was inserted inside the 6pm slot JNN gave for local news programs on weeknights. Since 2020, the format has been occupied by Pint NBC also hasda variety information program, Genabane! (げなパネ!), on Wednesdays at 7pm, the only large-scale weeknight program of their own production. Genabane! ended in March 2021.。

== AM to FM transition in Nagasaki and Saga ==
In 2021, as an effort to reduce costs caused by operating AM & FM stations simultaneously, and to improve business performance for all stations, the Ministry of Communications decided that all AM radio stations will be transitioning to Wide-FM broadcasting by 2028. Nagasaki Broadcasting, whose Wide FM service had started in 2015 (and 2016 for relay sister station NBC Radio Saga), is one of the 44 out of 47 stations that are slated to move to Wide FM broadcasting for its radio service, with the first set of AM suspensions happened in February 2024, when NBC Radio Saga (JOUO, 1458kHz) and its AM relays in Karatsu, Arita, and Imari, were shut down for 1 year as part of this demonstration experiment. NBC suggested on its website that listeners in Saga should be able to listen to their Wide FM frequencies (Saga - 93.5MHz, Tosu - 92.1MHz). Also, in December 2025, NBC announced on its website that they will be suspending operations for its Isahaya AM relay until September 30, 2026, with listeners being advised to listen to the station's Wide FM frequency relay for the said area on 91.8MHz.
