= TBS Radio =

Japanese radio station

JOKR
- Logo used since 2020

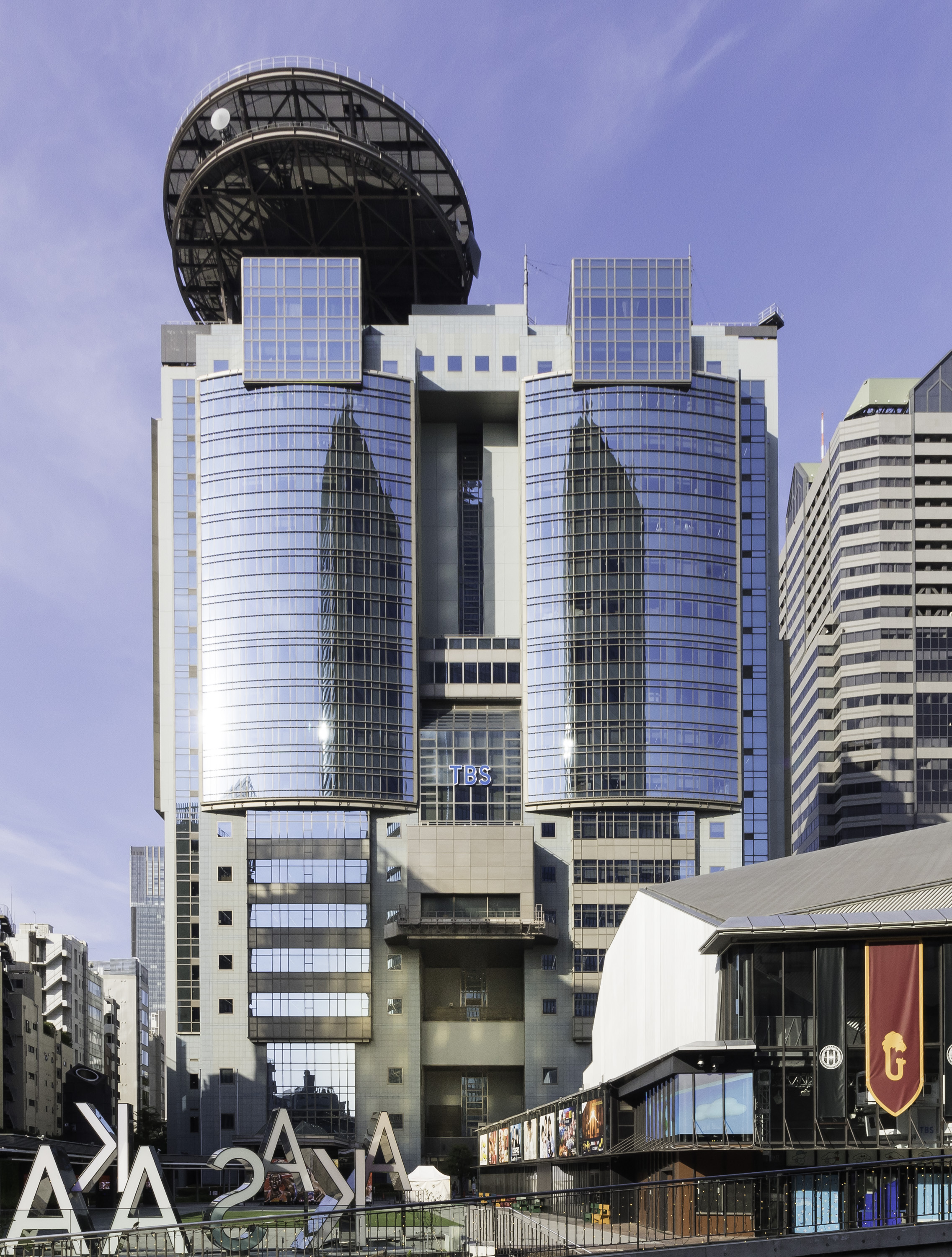
- Headquarters in Minato, Tokyo
- Tokyo; Japan
- Broadcast area: Kantō Region
- Frequencies: 954 kHz (AM), 90.5 MHz (FM)
- Branding: TBS Radio

Programming
- Language: Japanese
- Format: Talk
- Affiliations: Japan Radio Network

Ownership
- Owner: TBS Radio, Inc.

History
- First air date: 25 December 1951; 74 years ago
- Former names: KRT Radio Tokyo (1951-1960)
- Call sign meaning: JO; Kabushikigaisha (K.K.) Radio Tokyo (former branding)

Technical information
- Licensing authority: MIC
- Power: 100,000 watts

Links
- Webcast: radiko.jp (Kantō region only)
- Website: https://www.tbs.co.jp/radio/

Corporate information
- Company
- Native name: 株式会社TBSラジオ
- Formerly: TBS Radio & Communications, Inc. (2000-2016)
- Type: Kabushiki gaisha
- Industry: Media
- Founded: 21 March 2000; 26 years ago
- Headquarters: TBS Broadcasting Center, Akasaka Gochome, Minato, Tokyo, Japan
- Services: Radio network
- Parent: TBS Holdings
- Website: https://tbsradio.co.jp

TBS Radio, Inc. (Japanese: 株式会社TBSラジオ) is a radio station in Tokyo, Japan, the flagship radio station of the Japan Radio Network (JRN). The company was founded by the Tokyo Broadcasting System (TBS, presently named TBS Holdings, Inc.) on March 21, 2000. TBS Radio started broadcasting on December 25, 1951.

== History ==
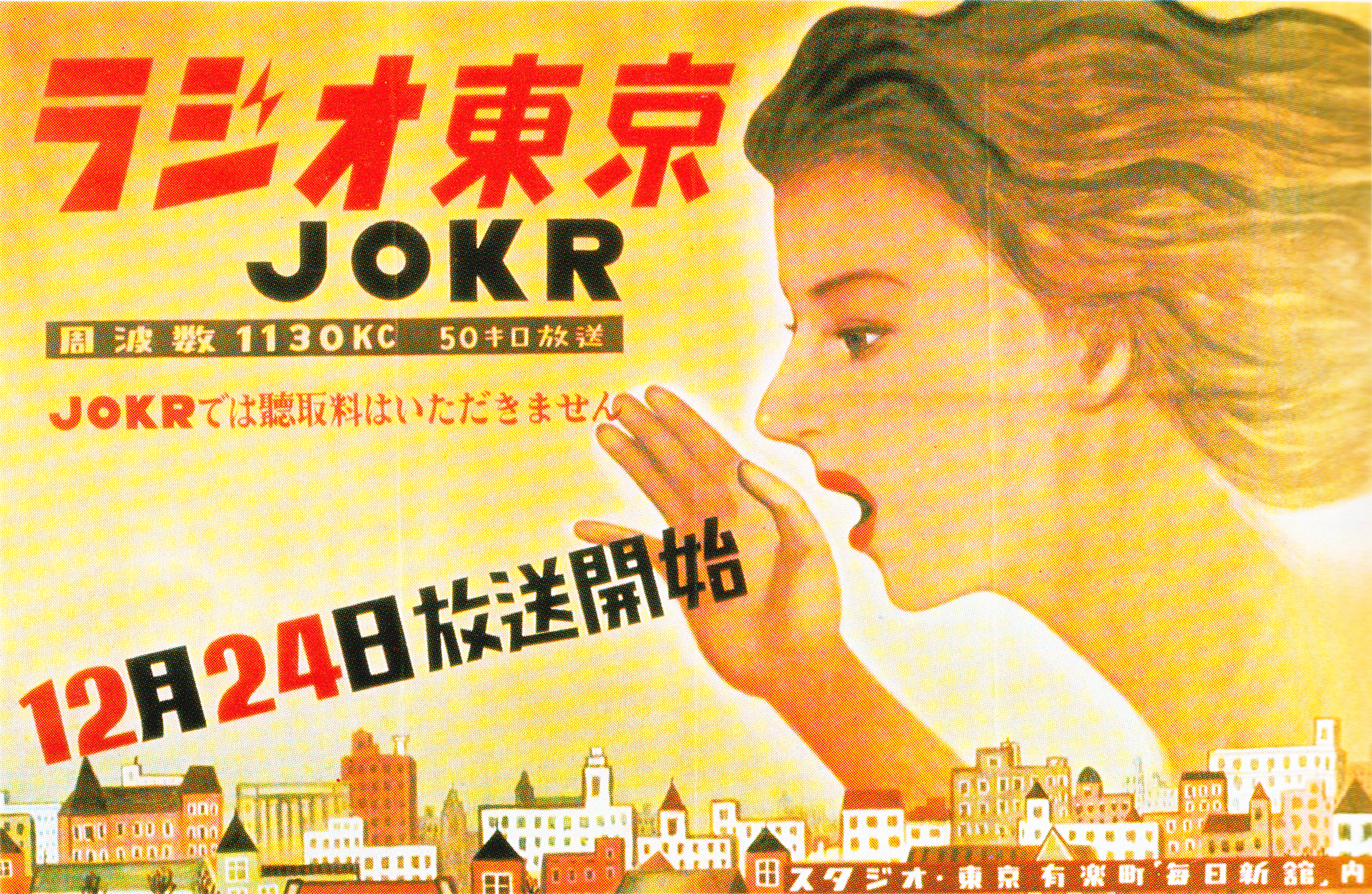
Advertisement promoting the launch of Radio Tokyo in 1951

Logo used at the time of Radio Tokyo

Radio Tokyo presented a license to the Ministry of Posts and Telecommunications (the current Ministry of Internal Affairs and Communications) on January 10, 1951. Subsequently the license was approved on April 21 and the company was established on May 17. A transmitter in Toda was inaugurated on August 9. The installation was complete on November 20, a 50kW transmitter (RCA BTA-50Fi) provided by RCA from the United States. The first test broadcast was at 1p.m. on December 7.

The license was granted on December 15 (JOKR, frequency 1130kc., output 50kW) and held regular test broadcasts from December 17. On December 24, an opening ceremony was held from Shinbashi Enbujo and was broadcast live. Regular broadcasts started the following day at 6:30a.m. It became the sixth commercial radio station in Japan to sign on. On April 1, 1952, at 11p.m., the first late night radio show, the English Hour, started, whose target was Occupation Forces soldiers and their families.

The station changed its frequency from 1130 to 950kc. on August 15, 1953, with the former frequency being taken over by Nippon Cultural Broadcasting, who had moved from its former frequency of 1310kc. due to the launch of the Nippon Broadcasting System. Aiming for the start of television broadcasts, the company name changed from Radio Tokyo to KRT: the initials coming from the callsign JOKR with the T creating the Japanese name K.K. Radio Tokyo and also forming JOKR-TV.

On April 17, 1955, the station premiered Hi-Fi Time, which was the first program that played Hi-Fi tracks in Japan. In 1956, it broadcast the 1956 Summer Olympics in Melbourne, the first time the Olympics were carried out by a commercial broadcaster. In 1958, the station started professional baseball broadcasts, with Toshiba as the title sponsor at the time.

On November 29, 1960, Radio Tokyo changed its name to TBS. Newspapers still listed it under its old name for some time.

TBS logo from 1961 to 1991

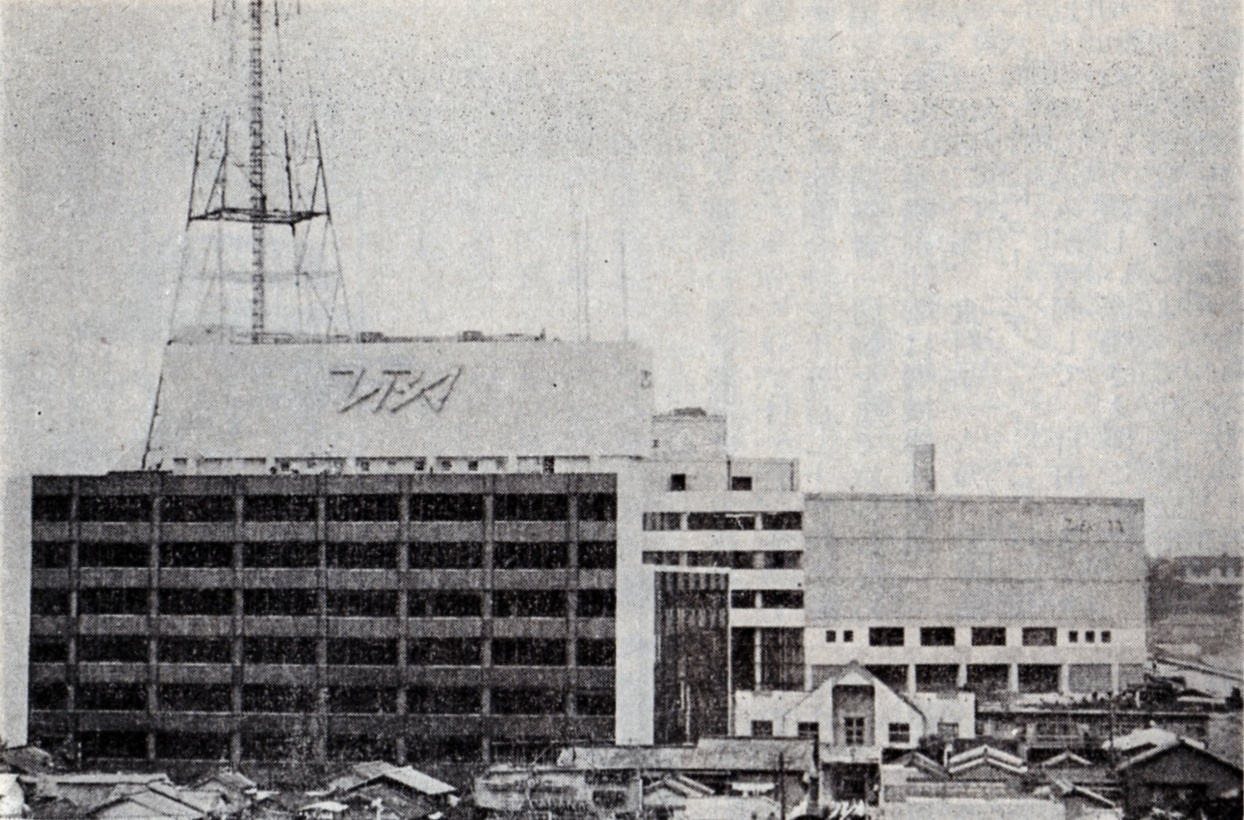
Outside of the old company building when it was completed (1961)

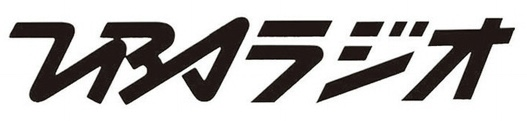
TBS Radio logo at the time

TBS adopted a new logo in August 1961, and on October 12, 1961, TBS opened its first corporate headquarters at Akasaka Media Building, relocating from its initial headquarters at the Mainichi Shimbun office in Yurakucho. From December 1, 1961, TBS became the sole official name.

On April 13, 1962, TBS obtained a preliminary license for AM stereo broadcasts (the first in Japan) using the AFM (AM/FM) method and the experimental callsign JOK2R. The test signals for AM stereo broadcasting launched on June 21, 1962. The license was obtained on June 30 and experimental broadcasts (30 to 45 minutes per night) are conducted from July 21, after TBS Radio had signed off. A second license for such broadcasts was granted on June 14, 1963, lasting until 1964. Since no re-license application was made after that, the license was granted in the same year, and the experimental broadcasts ceased.

TBS Radio formed the Japan Radio Network with the station as its flagship on May 2, 1965.

On March 8, 1969, the Tokyo Broadcasting Labor Union conducted a partial strike demanding a raise in bases. In November 1971, the output was increased to 100kW.

TBS Radio logo after the change in frequency

With the approval of the Geneva Frequency Plan of 1975, effective November 23, 1978, TBS Radio moved its frequency to 954kHz.

On October 1, 2001, the radio station inherited the AM broadcasting station license from Tokyo Broadcasting. Along with this, the calling name "Tokyo Broadcasting" was abolished. TBS R&C converted to a general broadcasting company, inherited the callsign JOKR, and was given the call name TBS Radio. As a result, Tokyo Broadcasting System's television division, which converted to a TV-only station, abolished and returned the callsign "JOKR-TV" and changed its callsign to JORX-TV (later JORX-DTV) and the call name TBS Television was granted.

On July 31, 2026, TBS Radio announced that it will cease its operations of the Emergency Warning Broadcast System on August 3.
