= National Baptist Convention =

National Baptist Convention may refer to:

== United States ==
- National Baptist Convention, USA, Inc., the oldest and largest denomination using this name
- National Baptist Convention of America, Inc., formed in 1915 as a result of a split within the association now called National Baptist Convention, USA, Inc.
- Progressive National Baptist Convention, formed in 1961 as a result of a split within the National Baptist Convention, USA, Inc.
- National Missionary Baptist Convention of America, formed in 1988 as a result of a split within the National Baptist Convention of America, Inc.
- Joint National Baptist Convention, an event held periodically in which the above conventions meet

== Brazil ==
- National Baptist Convention, Brazil

== See also ==
- List of Baptist denominations
- NBC (disambiguation)
