= Kitanihon Broadcasting =

Television station in Toyama Prefecture, Japan

Kitanihon Broadcasting Co., Ltd.

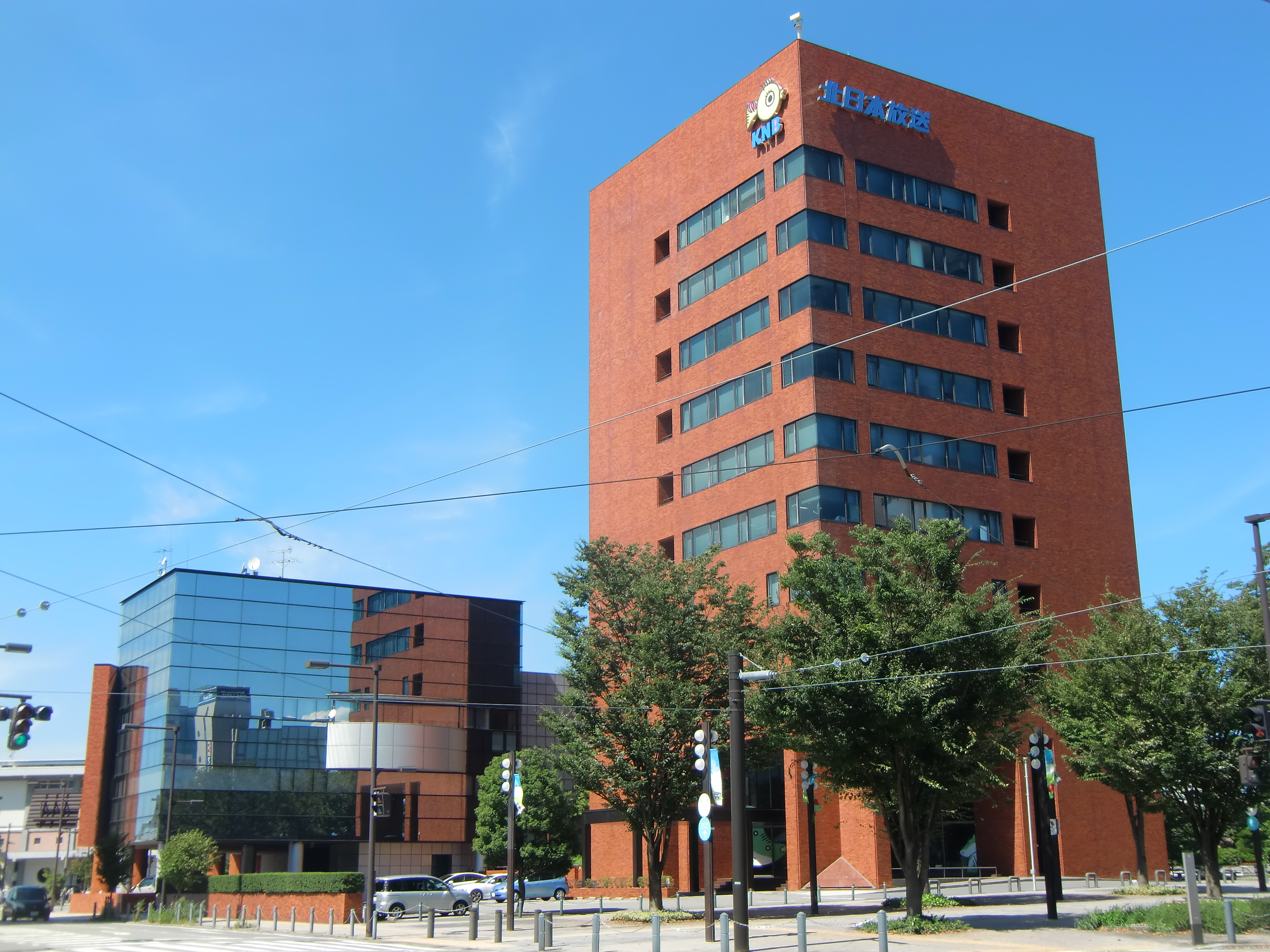
- Trade name: KNB
- Native name: 北日本放送株式会社
- Romanized name: Kitanihon Hōsō Kabushiki-gaisha
- Type: Kabushiki gaisha
- Industry: Television and Radio broadcasting
- Founded: March 14, 1952; 74 years ago
- Headquarters: 10-18 Ushimacho, Toyama City, Toyama Prefecture, Japan
- Website: www.knb.ne.jp
- Footnotes; Data from its Company Profile

JOLR
- Toyama; Japan
- Broadcast area: Toyama Prefecture
- Frequencies: 738 kHz (AM); 90.2 MHz (FM)
- Branding: KNB Radio

Programming
- Language: Japanese
- Affiliations: JRN, NRN

Ownership
- Owner: Kitanihon Broadcasting Co., Ltd.

History
- First air date: 4 July 1952

Links
- Website: www.knb.ne.jp/radio/

JOLR-DTV
- Toyama Prefecture; Japan
- City: Toyama
- Channels: Digital: 28 (UHF); Virtual: 1
- Branding: KNB Television

Programming
- Language: Japanese
- Affiliations: Nippon News Network and Nippon Television Network System

Ownership
- Owner: Kitanihon Broadcasting Co., Ltd.

History
- First air date: 1 April 1959
- Former call signs: JOLR-TV (1959-2011)
- Former channel numbers: Analog: 1 (VHF, 1959–2011)

Technical information
- Licensing authority: MIC

Links
- Website: www.knb.ne.jp/tv/

Kitanihon Broadcasting Co., Ltd. (北日本放送株式会社, Kitanihon Hōsō Kabushiki-gaisha), also known as KNB, is a Japanese broadcast network affiliated with Nippon News Network (NNN) and Nippon Television Network System (NNS). Their headquarters are located in Toyama Prefecture.

== History ==
With the promulgation of the Three Radio Laws, it was initially expected in 1948 that Toyama would be the target area of a radio station from Ishikawa as Hokuriku Cultural Broadcasting (the later Hokuriku Broadcasting Company). Teru Nakayama, editor-in-chief of the Kitanihon Shimbun, who felt a sense of crisis about this, advised the top management to apply for a license for a private radio station. At this time, no one listened, but this was the trigger that later led to the opening of Kitanihon Broadcasting.

Kitanihon Broadcasting applied for a license on February 15, 1951 and issued its preliminary license on April 21 the same year.

The young network opened its radio service on March 14, 1952, with television broadcasts debuting in the summer.
