= National Bank of Commerce =

National Bank of Commerce may refer to:

- National Bank of Commerce (Birmingham), owned by Alabama National BanCorporation, taken over by RBC Bank in 2008
- National Bank of Commerce (Kansas City)
- National Bank of Commerce, Lincoln, Nebraska, part of First Commerce Bancshares, taken over by Wells Fargo Bank in 2000
- National Bank of Commerce (Memphis)
- National Bank of Commerce (Mississippi) (which became Cadence Bank)
- National Bank of Commerce in New York
- National Bank of Commerce, Superior, Wisconsin, founded 1934, part of Natcom Bancshares
- National Bank of Commerce (Tanzania)
- National Bank of Commerce (Uganda), Closed and liquidated in 2012

== See also ==
- National Bank of Commerce Building (disambiguation)
