= Japan Radio Network =

Japanese radio network

- Current logo of the Japan Radio Network

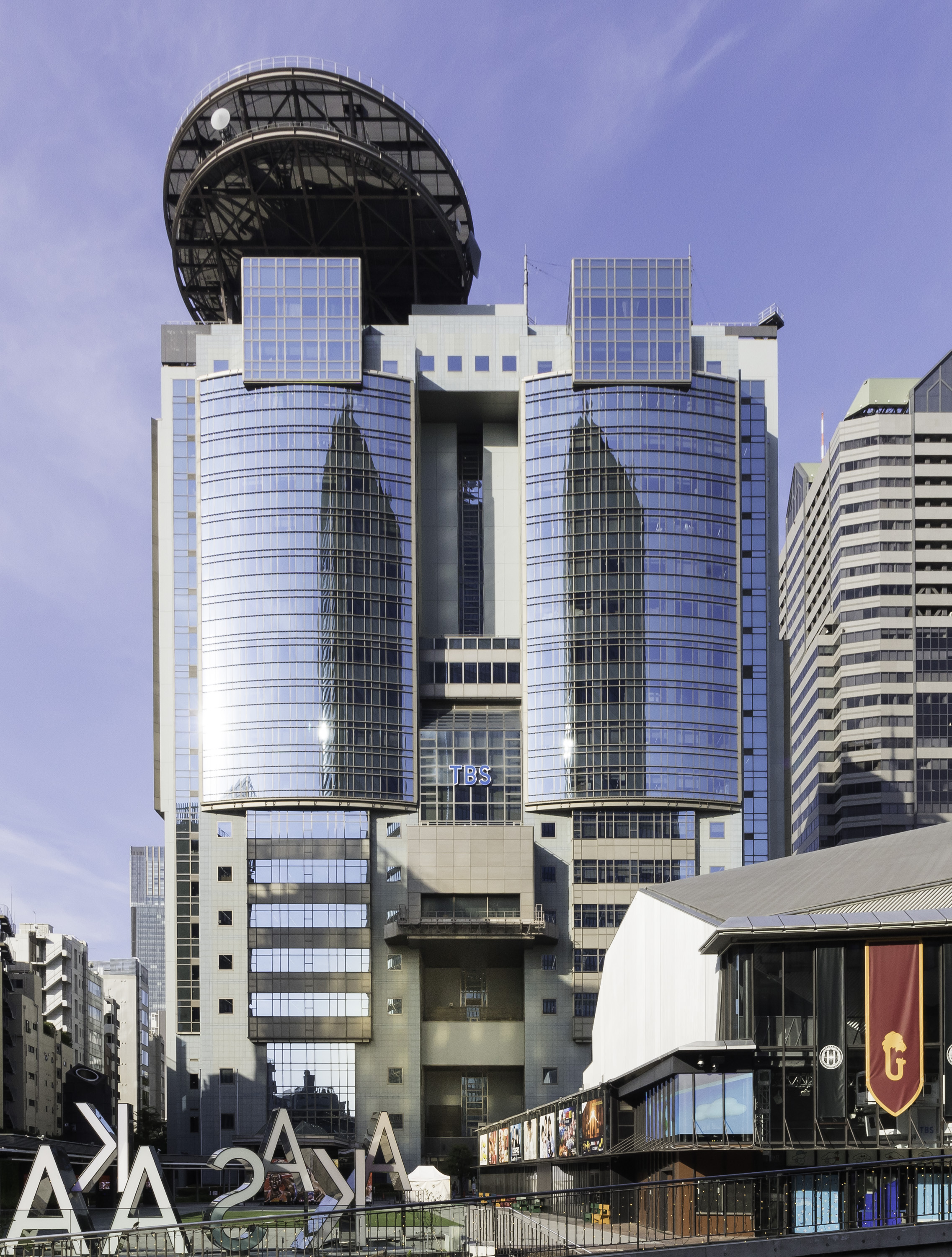
- Headquarters in Minato, Tokyo
- Type: Commercial radio network
- Country: Japan
- Broadcast area: Nationwide
- Headquarters: TBS Broadcasting Center, Akasaka, Minato, Tokyo, Japan

Ownership
- Owner: TBS Holdings

History
- Founded: 2 May 1965 (61 years ago)

Coverage
- Availability: Nationwide
- Affiliates: See list

Links
- Website: JRN

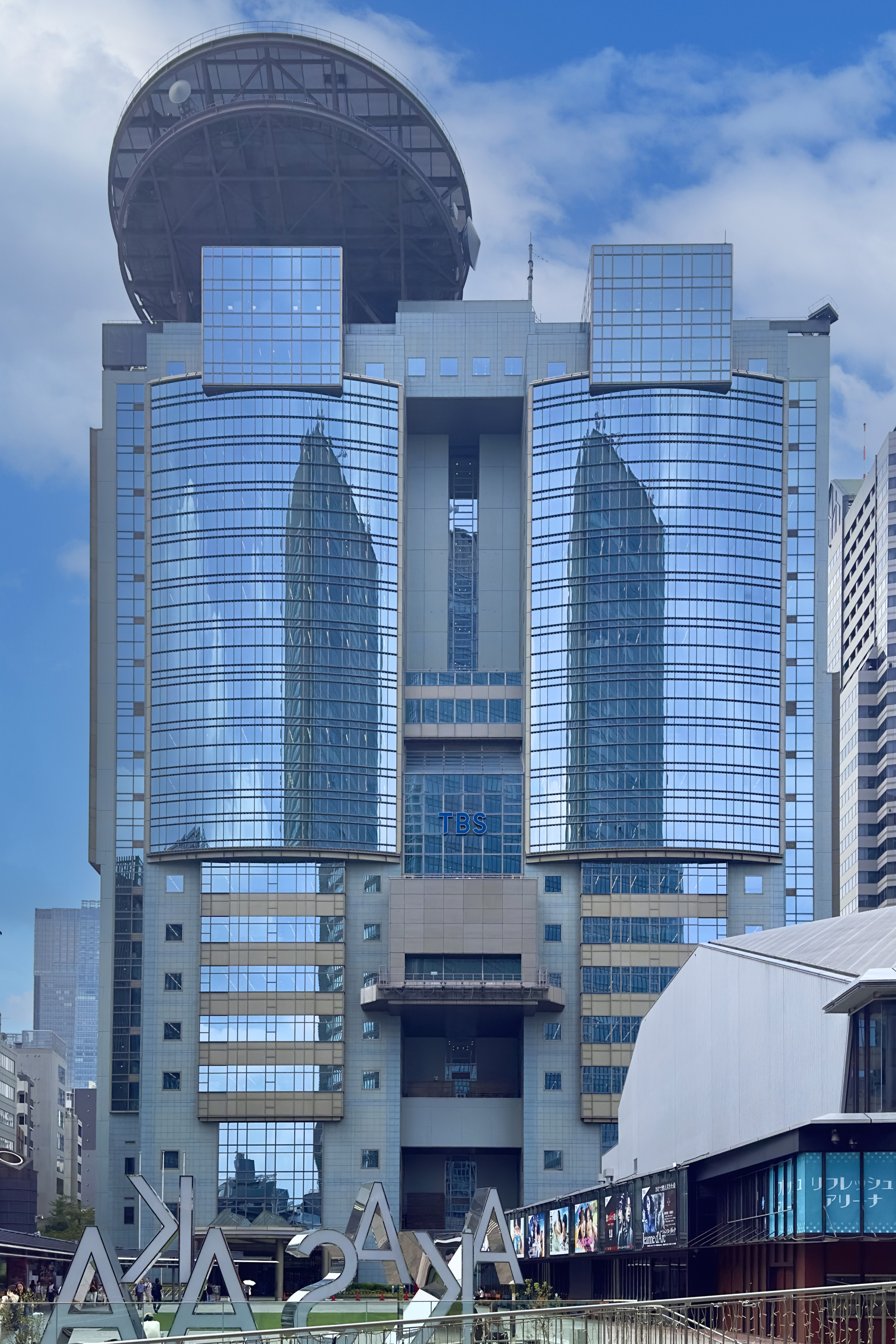
TBS Holdings headquarters in Minato, Tokyo.

Japan Radio Network (JRN; Japanese: ジャパン・ラジオ・ネットワーク) is a Japanese commercial radio network run by TBS Radio in Tokyo, owned by TBS Holdings (which is a part of the major conglomerate Mitsui Group). Established on 2 May 1965, JRN is made up of 34 regional affiliates, including four full-time affiliates and 30 stations that are dual-affiliated with the rival National Radio Network (NRN) as a part of "cross-network" practice in Japan. While the Japan News Network, the television arm of TBS, has an agreement that forbids its affiliates (examples are RKK & MBS) to do news sharing with other stations affiliated with other networks, JRN allows its radio stations to do cross-network programming, mainly, with NRN programs, and other production companies (Including Tuesday Club programs.). Currently, JRN has 4 stations that are only affiliated with the network, which consists of key stations TBS Radio, CBC Radio, RKB Radio, and JRN-only affiliate RBC iRadio.

Out of the 34 regional affiliates, 20 JRN stations are connected with a JNN station (ex. RCC Radio & RCC Television), with some operating the affiliate as a separate radio subsidiary (MBS, CBC, and from 2026 or 2027, MRO Radio, as Hokuriku Broadcasting plans to split the TV and radio entities, making the radio division, owned by a spin-off preparatory company, a subsidiary of the company.), 10 are connected with a Nippon TV (NNN/NNS) affiliate (ex. KRY Radio & KRY Television), 1 as a radio subsidiary of Asahi Broadcasting Corporation (whose TV subsidiary is under ANN, and is a former JNN affiliate), one connected to a dual NNN/NNS & ANN affiliate (Fukui Broadcasting), and two that are operating as a radio-only station (RFC and WBS).

3 JRN-affiliated stations, whose television stations are tied to JNN, are NRN-core stations, with dedicated lines for NRN programs, mostly from Nippon Broadcasting/JOLF. These stations are: RCC in Hiroshima, TBC in Sendai, and SBS in Shizuoka. Also, although NBC Radio Saga is a radio station in Saga Prefecture, it's a subsidiary of Nagasaki Broadcasting, and currently absorbed most of its in-house programming schedule into the main Nagasaki station when the company reorganized in 2021, and made the Saga station a relay station of the company. Elsewhere, Nishinippon Broadcasting (RNC Radio), who was then the default NRN station for the Okayama-Takamatsu market, is the last broadcasting company who joined the JRN in October 1997. That same month of the same year, RSK Sanyo Broadcasting, who serves as the default JRN station in the same market, joined rival NRN, which makes both radio stations serve as the default JRN-NRN cross-network stations in their respective areas, unlike their television counterparts, where they serve both markets (RSK for JNN, RNC for NNN/NNS)

Despite not being a member of the network, Kobe's Radio Kansai (formerly an NRN affiliate), and NRN core station OBC Radio Osaka also airs some JRN programming as a way to boost program sales, and in the case of Radio Osaka, they will air these programs as fellow NRN core stations, ABC and MBS respectively, were airing their own blend of local programming. The late-night JUNK lineup is aired on Radio Kansai, while the BRAND NEW MORNING program is aired on Radio Osaka, as both JRN core stations MBS & ABC all have their local morning radio shows. Interestingly, due to program sales as well, 2 key JRN-only stations air NRN programming that their key affiliates will not air. These stations are CBC Radio in Nagoya, and RKB Radio in Fukuoka.

In addition, all JRN affiliates, excluding Hokkaido (HBC) and Akita (ABS), are in the process of transitioning from AM radio to Wide FM since 2024, with some stations, like KRY in Yamaguchi, RNB FNam in Matsuyama, RAB in Aomori, and Shikoku Broadcasting in Tokushima, are suspending almost all of their AM relays, including their main AM hub, in order to facilitate FM broadcasting during the experimental stage. The transition will last up until 2028, with some abolishing their AM frequencies completely, becoming full-time FM radio broadcasters, while some will keep their AM stations running while shutting down the relays to cut down costs. Due to vast, sparsely populated areas, and also budget concerns in building new FM relay sites, HBC and ABS will remain as the only JRN affiliates who're broadcasting programs on both AM and FM frequencies.

== List of affiliates ==
Stations are listed mostly in Japanese order of prefectures which is mirrored in ISO 3166-2:JP.

Broadcasting area(s)		Station			Frequency		Start date of broadcast	Date of affiliation	Dual affiliation with NRN	Note(s)
Prefecture	Region	On air branding	Abbr.	Call sign	AM	FM	Start date of broadcast	Date of affiliation	Dual affiliation with NRN	Note(s)
Hokkaidō		HBC Radio	HBC	JOHR	1287 kHz	91.5 MHz	10 March 1952	2 May 1965	Yes	Core station
Aomori	Tōhoku	Aomori Hōsō	RAB	JOGR	1233 kHz	91.7 MHz	12 October 1953	2 May 1965	Yes	
Iwate	Tōhoku	Iwate Hōsō	IBC	JODF	684 kHz	90.6 MHz	25 December 1953	2 May 1965	Yes	
Miyagi	Tōhoku	Tohoku Hōsō	TBC	JOIR	1260 kHz	93.5 MHz	1 May 1952	2 May 1965	Yes	
Akita	Tōhoku	Akita Hōsō	ABS	JOTR	936 kHz	90.1 MHz	1 November 1953	2 May 1965	Yes	
Yamagata	Tōhoku	Yamagata Hōsō	YBC	JOEF	918 kHz	92.4 MHz	15 October 1953	2 May 1965	Yes	
Fukushima	Tōhoku	Radio Fukushima	RFC	JOWR	1458 kHz	90.8 MHz	1 December 1953	2 May 1965	Yes	
Kantō region		TBS Radio	TBS	JOKR	954 kHz	90.5 MHz	25 December 1951	2 May 1965	No	Flagship station
Niigata	Chūbu	Niigata Hōsō	BSN	JODR	1116 kHz	92.7 MHz	24 December 1952	2 May 1965	Yes	
Toyama	Chūbu	Kitanihon Hōsō	KNB	JOLR	738 kHz	90.2 MHz	1 July 1952	1 December 1980	Yes	
Ishikawa	Chūbu	Hokuriku Hōsō (By 2027, MRO Radio)	MRO	JOMR	1107 kHz	94.0 MHz	10 May 1952	2 May 1965	Yes	
Fukui	Chūbu	Fukui Hōsō	FBC	JOPR	864 kHz	94.6 MHz	20 July 1952	2 May 1965	Yes	
Yamanashi	Chūbu	Yamanashi Hōsō	YBS	JOJF	765 kHz	90.9 MHz	1 July 1954	2 May 1965	Yes	
Nagano	Chūbu	Shin-etsu Hōsō	SBC	JOSR	1098 kHz	92.2 MHz	25 March 1952	2 May 1965	Yes	
Shizuoka	Chūbu	Shizuoka Hōsō	SBS	JOVR	1404 kHz	93.9 MHz	1 November 1952	2 May 1965	Yes	
Aichi and Gifu	Chūbu	CBC Radio	CBC	JOAR	1053 kHz	93.7 MHz	1 September 1951	2 May 1965	No	Core station
Mie	Kansai	CBC Radio	CBC	JOAR	1053 kHz	93.7 MHz	1 September 1951	2 May 1965	No	Core station
Kansai region (except Mie)		MBS Radio	MBS	JOOR	1179 kHz	90.6 MHz	1 September 1951	2 May 1965	Yes	Core station
Kansai region (except Mie)		ABC Radio	ABC	JONR	1008 kHz	93.3 MHz	11 November 1951	2 May 1965	Yes	Core station
Wakayama	Kansai	Wakayama Hōsō	WBS	JOVF	1431 kHz	94.2 MHz	1 April 1959	2 February 1979	Yes	
Tottori and Shimane	Chūgoku	San-in Hōsō	BSS	JOHF	900 kHz	92.2 MHz	1 March 1954	2 May 1965	Yes	
Okayama	Chūgoku	Sanyo Hōsō	RSK	JOYR	1494 kHz	91.4 MHz	1 October 1953	2 May 1965	Yes	
Hiroshima	Chūgoku	RCC Broadcasting	RCC	JOER	1350 kHz	94.6 MHz	1 October 1952	2 May 1965	Yes	
Yamaguchi	Chūgoku	Yamaguchi Hōsō	KRY	JOPF	765 kHz	92.3 MHz	1 April 1956	26 October 1982	Yes	
Tokushima	Shikoku	Shikoku Hōsō	JRT	JOJR	1269 kHz	93.0 MHz	1 July 1952	2 May 1965	Yes	
Kagawa	Shikoku	Nishinippon Hōsō	RNC	JOKF	1449 kHz	90.3 MHz	1 October 1953	5 September 1997	Yes	
Ehime	Shikoku	Nankai Hōsō	RNB	JOAF	1116 kHz	91.7 MHz	1 October 1953	2 May 1965	Yes	
Kōchi	Shikoku	Kochi Hōsō	RKC	JOZR	900 kHz	90.8 MHz	1 September 1953	2 May 1965	Yes	
Fukuoka	Kyūshū	RKB Radio	RKB	JOFR	1278 kHz	91.0 MHz	1 December 1951	2 May 1965	No	Core station
Saga	Kyūshū	NBC Radio Saga	NBC	JOUO	1458 kHz	93.5 MHz	1 August 1958	2 May 1965	Yes	
Nagasaki	Kyūshū	Nagasaki Hōsō	NBC	JOUR	1233 kHz	92.6 MHz	1 March 1953	2 May 1965	Yes	
Kumamoto	Kyūshū	Kumamoto Hōsō	RKK	JOBF	1197 kHz	91.4 MHz	1 October 1953	2 May 1965	Yes	
Ōita	Kyūshū	Oita Hōsō	OBS	JOGF	1098 kHz	93.3 MHz	1 October 1953	2 May 1965	Yes	
Miyazaki	Kyūshū	Miyazaki Hōsō	MRT	JONF	936 kHz	90.4 MHz	1 July 1954	2 May 1965	Yes	
Kagoshima	Kyūshū	Minaminihon Hōsō	MBC	JOCF	1107 kHz	92.8 MHz	10 October 1953	2 May 1965	Yes	
Okinawa	Kyūshū	RBC-i Radio	RBC	JORR	738 kHz	92.1 MHz	1 October 1954	15 May 1972	No	
