= Radio Fukushima =

Radio station in Fukushima Prefecture, Japan

JOWR
- Logo used since 1978

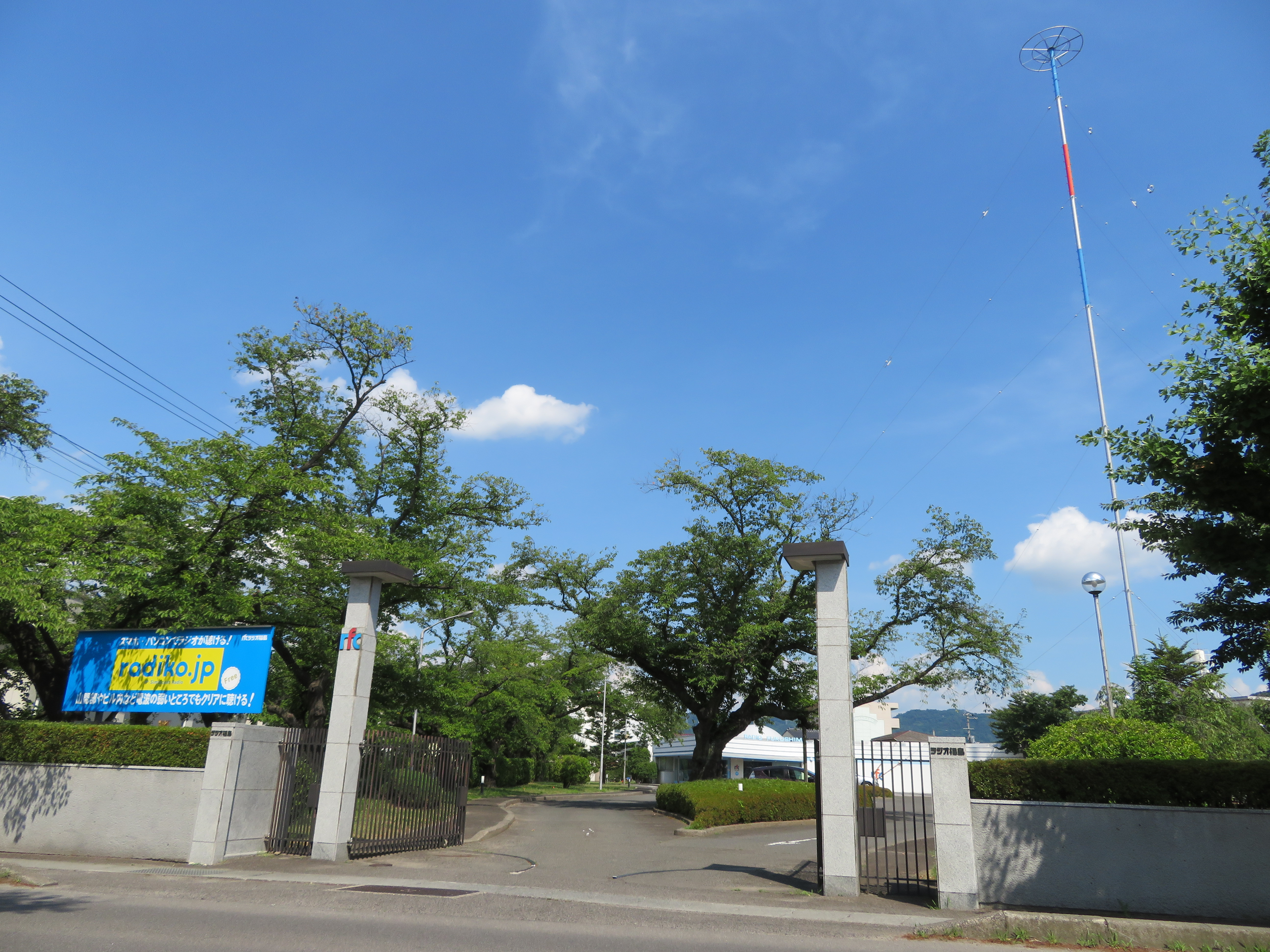
- Fukushima; Japan
- Broadcast area: Fukushima prefecture
- Frequency: See § Frequencies
- Branding: Radio Fukushima; RFC

Programming
- Language: Japanese
- Format: Talk/Sports
- Affiliations: Japan Radio Network; National Radio Network

Ownership
- Owner: Radio Fukushima Co., Ltd

History
- First air date: December 1, 1953

Technical information
- Licensing authority: MIC
- Power: 5 kW

Links
- Website: rfc.jp

Radio Fukushima Co., Ltd. (株式会社ラジオ福島), abbreviated as RFC, is a commercial radio station based in Fukushima Prefecture, Japan. It is the only commercial AM radio station in the prefecture and is affiliated with two AM radio networks. Unlike many other stations that have expanded into television, Radio Fukushima remains dedicated solely to radio broadcasting.

== History ==
RFC applied for a radio license in May 1953 for four stations: Fukushima (main), Koriyama, Wakamatsu, and Taira (now Iwaki). It received a preliminary license on August 1, 1953, began test broadcasts in November, and commenced regular broadcasts on December 1.

In 1955, RFC applied for a television license to become the first commercial TV station in the prefecture, initially covering Fukushima City with plans to expand. However, the Ministry of Posts and Telecommunications required RFC to merge its television license applications, and the license expired on April 1, 1958.

RFC joined the Japan Radio Network in May 1965 and the National Radio Network in April 1971. The station's power increased to 1 kW in February 1973. After the Fukushima nuclear accident, RFC provided 350 hours of continuous news coverage and aired a special eight-hour program on the first anniversary of the incident.

In 2014, RFC was available nationwide to Radiko.jp's premium subscribers. It established a relay station in 2016 and later opened an FM relay station. On September 1, 2020, RFC partnered with Tochigi Broadcasting and Ibaraki Broadcasting to exchange disaster and emergency information. In 2022, broadcasts were temporarily suspended due to damage from the Fukushima earthquake to the FM station's transmitting cable and Haramachi station's equipment.

== Frequencies ==
RFC covers much of Fukushima Prefecture with five joint AM-FM transmitters and three supplementary FM-only transmitters in the western part of the prefecture.

- Fukushima: 1458 kHz (JOWR)
- Koriyama: 1098 kHz (JOWO)
- Iwaki: 1431 kHz (JOWW)
- Haramachi: 801 kHz (JOFL)
- Aizuwakamatsu: 1395 kHz (JOWE)

FM:

- Fukushima, Koriyama, Aizuwakamatsu: 90.8 MHz
- Higashikaneyama: 77.8 MHz
- Nishi Kanayama, Kanayama: 79.3 MHz
- Iwaki, Haramachi: 90.2 MHz

The FM network was switched on in January 2016 with the opening of the Higashikaneyama FM supplementary relay station

== Announcers and presenters ==
=== Current ===
==== Employees ====
- Shinichi Tezuka (joined in 1993)
- Eiichi Ogawa (joined in 1995)
- Kenji Fukano (joined in 1995)
- Hisako Ishida (joined in 1998)
- Misako Yamaji (joined in 2003)

==== Under contract ====
- Mihoko Ibata (1991 - 1996. Even after leaving the company, she appeared as a freelancer and returned as a program contract announcer from April 1, 2010)

Naomi Kaito (1991-1996. Like Ibata, she appeared as a freelancer even after leaving the company, and returned as a contract announcer from April 1, 2010)

- Mika Watanabe (program contract announcer. She also appears on programs on competing station Fukushima FM, but is also treated as an announcer on RFC)
- Yohei Morimoto (April 2014 - now)
- Narumi Sato (April 2019 - now)
- Yukiko Kakazu (April 2019 - now)

=== Former ===
==== Male ====
- Yoshikazu Yamazaki (1953 - ?) - 1st period announcer. He was the first speaker at the station's opening on December 1, 1953.
- Eisei Fukuhara (1953–1959) - 1st period announcer. Later transferred to sales and retired after serving as sales manager and managing director.
- Tsutomu Okamoto (1953 - ?) - 1st term announcer. He retired after serving as director of director organization, managing director, and auditor.
- Mojiharu Sato (1959 - 1983) - Moved to TV-U Fukushima when it opened, later retired, and is currently professor emeritus at Fukushima Gakuin University.
- Tsuneji Yamaji - Transferred to FM Tokyo and worked until retirement
- Shunji Sugawara (1971–1988) - Died while in office
- Mamoru Arakawa (1972–2000) - Mamoru Arakawa Announcement Academy Director
- Kazuhide Ogata - Currently freelance mainly in Shizuoka, representative of announcer office Lips Co., Ltd. and Voice Alpha.
- Hidetoshi Arase - Transferred to FM Yamaguchi in 1985 when it opened in his native Yamaguchi Prefecture.
- Mikio Nakamura - After working at FM Shizuoka, now at TV-U Fukushima
- Akihisa Matsuzaka (1980–1983) - Moved to FM Shizuoka, now at Nagano Asahi Broadcasting
- Hiroshi Yatsuka (1982–1987) - Currently belongs to Keizo Production. Sky Perfect TV!・J SPORTS soccer and professional wrestling commentary, etc.
- Toshihiro Suzuki (1984–1992) - Currently at TV Shizuoka
- Yasuo Kurashiki (1984–1989) - Currently freelance. Sky Perfect TV!/J SPORTS soccer commentary, related program casters, etc.
- Yusuke Kato (1989–1995) - Currently at RF Radio Japan
- Yasuhide Kanda - Representative Director of Light Beyond Radio NIKKEI School Instructor
- Tatsuhiro Suzuki (1988–1994) - Currently at TV-U Yamagata
- Hideki Suzuki (1990–2000) - Currently at Niigata Sogo Television
- Yoshinori Takeshita - transferred from Higashinippon Broadcasting. Currently working freelance
- Toneyasu Kimura - Currently in charge of horse racing broadcasts at RF Radio Japan
- Yuichi Kato - Bloomberg Television → Stock Voice Reporter
- Tetsuya Sato (1995–2006) - Currently belongs to Voice On
- Akio Yoshida - Currently freelance. Representative Director of Office Crinum Co., Ltd.
- Yoshiharu Izumi (2006–2009) - Left the company in 2011 after transferring to the production and news department. Currently at Yamanashi Broadcasting
- Arata Owada (1977–2015) - Even after retirement, he continues to appear on programs as a freelancer.
- Tatsuya Kagamida (1988 - September 2022) - After leaving the company, he became a freelancer and continued to appear on the programs he was in charge of. He is the host of "Fukushima SHOW" (TUF).

==== Female ====
- Tomiko Okazaki (1962–1967) - Transferred to Tohoku Broadcasting and later ran for the House of Representatives and was elected for two terms. She was a third-term member of the House of Councilors. She died in 2017.
- Setsuko Ito - current surname Sugawara. President and Representative Director of Fukushima City ’s community FM station “FM POCO”
- Chieri Fukazawa - Media staff member
- Mariko Kato
- Keiko Matsuyama - Lecturer at Sun Broadcasting Company
- Akiko Fukuda - Office KR member
- Tamami Sekine
- Mihoko Maeba - Media staff member
- Mayumi Ogawa - Joy staff member
- Chikako Saisho - Currently appears as a news announcer on Nippon Broadcasting System and Nippon Cultural Broadcasting System as a freelancer.
- Chizuru Kobayashi - Currently freelance. She provides live commentary on tennis, figure skating, etc. on J SPORTS. Her husband is Yasuo Kurashiki, a colleague from her RFC days.
- Mika Nishimura
- Nami Takatatsu
- Yuko Okanda
- Haruna Oda
- Yumiko Okamoto
- Miho Asakawa
- Maki Tokunaga - Works as a reporter at a TV station in Hiroshima
- Yukiko Takashima - Belongs to Haikyo → Across Entertainment. narrator, bayfm information navigator
- Tomoko Okuhara
- Akiko Hiramatsu - Currently FM Gifu Personality
- Yuri Sakami - Currently belongs to SOPromotion
- Megumi Goto - TV Yamanashi → Belongs to Joy Staff
- Mori Isuzu
- Akiko Yamagishi
- Hiroe Kuchiki
- Shuko Yamamoto
- Akiyo Suzuki
- Nahomi Suzuki
- Shiho Tsuchiya - Later (1992–1994) worked as an announcer at Shizuoka Daiichi Television
- Yumiko Satake
- Tomoyo Tsukinokizawa
- Kyoko Hayashi
- Kayoko Atsumi - Currently NACK5 news announcer. She also served as a DJ on Uptown Morning in the past.
- Michiko Takeno
- Michiko Takeishi
- Ayako Fukasawa
- Ryoko Watanabe
- Keiko Saji
- Orihisa Kuwa - Part-time announcer when TV U Fukushima opened → contract terminated.
- Miyuki Uematsu - Transferred as an announcer when AIR-G' opened, later transferred to the sales department
- Miyuki Shimizu - After getting married, she became a contract announcer for FM Aomori as "Miyuki Okawara"
- Aiko Kawasaki (1992 - ?) - Weather forecaster, disaster prevention specialist
- Mayumi Hirose (1993–1994) - During her time at the company, she was murdered by a male reporter from Nara Television Broadcasting (at the time) who she was dating.
- Rika Masui (1993 - ?) - Rika Masui. After she appeared on Radio NIKKEI's stock program, she dropped out in February 2007 due to her childbirth. She has not had any major activities since then.
- Masayo Maruo (1993 - ?)
- Nami Yoshida (1994–1998)
- Hisako Ohba (2000 - September 2008)
- Yasaka Shimada (2000–2012)
- Kaori Matsui (2001 - September 2010)
- Mika Watanabe (2003–2009) - Since May 2014, has been in charge of the personality of "Saturday Music Station Adult Club Activity Project"
- Yukari Ono (2006 - October 2009)
- Aina Hayashi (2009-September 2010) - Former female college student reporter for Minna no Terebi (TV Kanagawa). She transferred to Toyama TV from October 2010.
- Hitomi Sasaki (October 2010 - March 2014)
- Tomoko Nishino (April 2014 - March 2015. Contract announcer)
- Shiyoshi Yagi (October 2010 - March 2016)
- Sakiko Sugawara (April 2017 - January 2019, currently Akita Television)
- Arisa Inamoto (April 2017 - March 2019)
- Michiko Sugawara (1981–2019) - Continued to appear on some programs even after retirement
