= Nippon Bass Club =

Japanese fishing sport club

- Purpose: Sport fishing advocacy
- Location: Japan
- Chairman: Shigeru Yamashita
- Parent organization: Japan Bass Pro Association
- Website: jbnbc.jp/

The Nippon Bass Club (日本バスクラブ) is the largest amateur sports fishing club in Japan.

This organization has been known to sponsor Japanese fishing games like JB The Super Bass. A salt water chapter is included in order to support salt water fishing in Japan. Hundreds of kilograms of fish are caught by the members of the Nippon Bass Club every year. One of the more notable members is Mr. Shoichi Terai; who runs a private bass fishing school on Lake Kasumigaura.

The organization has local chapters in regions like Fukuoka, Aichi, and Kyoto. One of the primary sponsors of this organization is Gary Yamamoto's Custom Baits.
