= NBC Radio Saga =

Radio station in Saga Prefecture, Japan

JOUO
- Saga; Japan
- Broadcast area: Saga Prefecture
- Frequencies: 1458 kHz (AM); 93.5 MHz (FM)
- Branding: NBC Radio Saga

Programming
- Language: Japanese
- Format: Talk, Sports
- Affiliations: JRN, NRN

Ownership
- Owner: Nagasaki Broadcasting Co., Ltd.

History
- First air date: August 1, 1958; 68 years ago

Technical information
- Licensing authority: MIC
- Power: 5 kW

Links
- Website: www.nbc-nagasaki.co.jp/radio/

NBC Radio Saga (NBCラジオ佐賀, NBC Rajio Saga) is a radio station in Saga Prefecture, Japan. The station is a subsidiary of Nagasaki Broadcasting and is a JRN-NRN affiliate.

NBC Radio Saga has its own office & studios when their Honjo Headquarters were established in 1958. In 2020, due to the aging of the previous studios, the station moved its equipment to its current location is at the Combox Saga Ekimae mall.

== History ==
NBC Radio Saga is unique among Japanese radio stations, where the prefectural AM radio station was set up by a station in another prefecture. NBC had previously entered into a conflict with Radio Sasebo, which tried obtaining a radio license in Sasebo, in the north of the prefecture, starting its broadcasts on April 1, 1954; ultimately the station merged with NBC and became a mere relay station on October 1, 1954. A few years later, in 1958, NBC obtained a radio license in the prefecture, and on August 1, 1958, NBC Radio Saga (callsign JOUO) started broadcasting. This enabled NBC to broadcast to two prefectures, even though each prefecture had its own station. Until the opening of FM Saga in 1992, it was the prefecture's only commercial radio station.

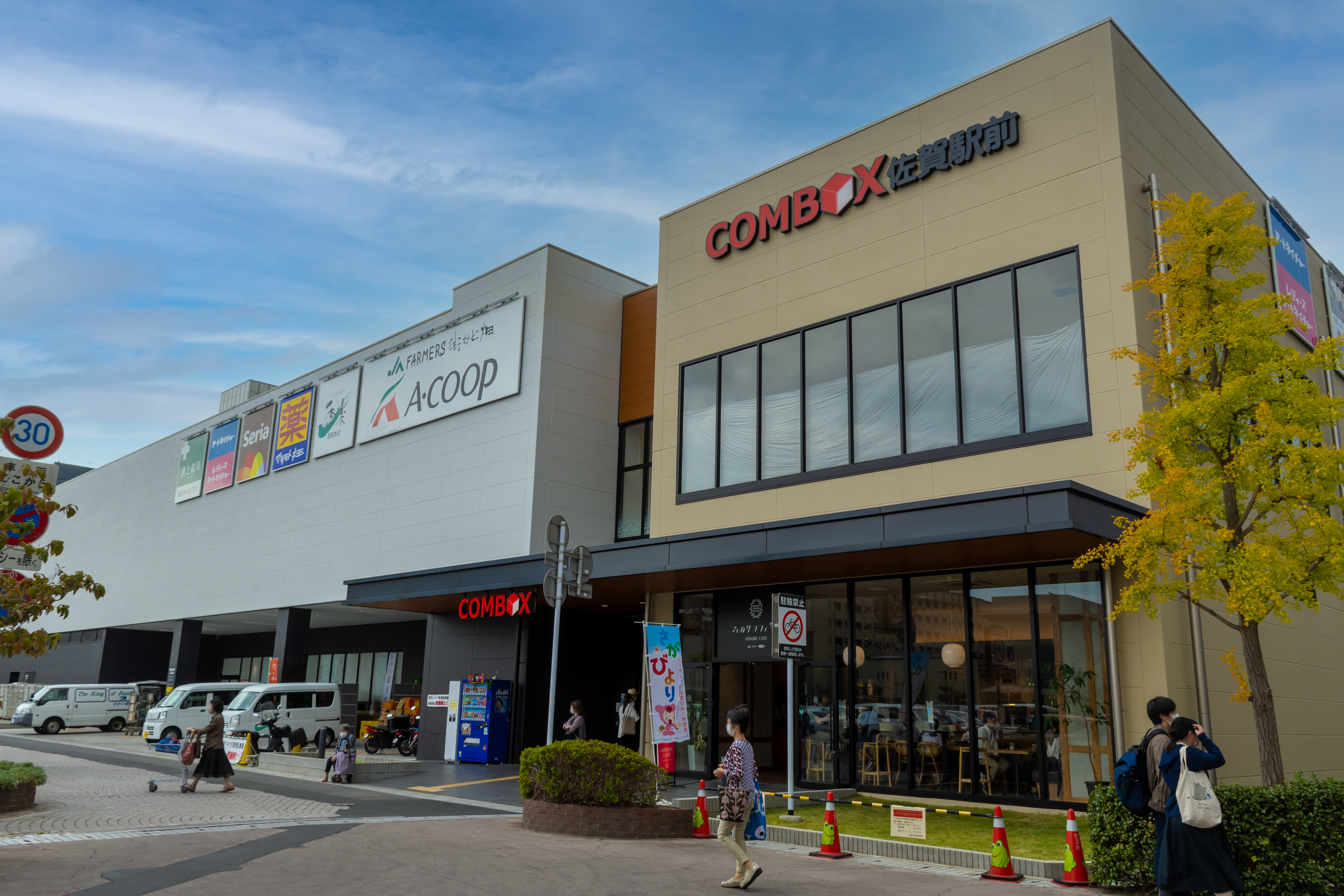
The COMBOX Saga Ekimae mall, where NBC Radio Saga is located and are currently broadcasting since they have moved from their Honjo offices in 2020.

In line with the push given by the Ministry of Internal Affairs and Communications to install FM relay stations (Wide FM) of the existing AM services, it installed an FM station in Yawata-dake, Karatsu city. This was followed by a second one in Tosu in July 2020.。

The station announced on July 22, 2019 that it would move to a new building (Combox Saga Ekimae) due to old age of the existing one. The tentative relocation target was May 2020. Regular broadcasting from the new facilities began on June 15, 2020.

NBC always treated Radio Saga as a mere relay with limited local programming catering the prefecture, however, the station had no online stream, not even on Radiko. This was solved on October 1, 2021, when the station was added to the platform, which was described as "a new challenge for NBC Radio" and declaring itself as being "a radio station that caters to western Kyushu". On August 31, 2022, the station's website shut down and merged its contents with its parent station in Nagasaki. Also, all Saga-based programming, like NBC R50 (Which is currently being aired and produced in its Saga studios, and sometimes, at the main Nagasaki station), are also being broadcast on Radiko for the very first time after the merger, as the main Nagasaki station absorbed the Saga-based programming as part of its schedule.

In February 2024, in line with the transition from AM to FM in Japan, NBC Radio started implementing AM broadcasting suspensions, starting with NBC Radio Saga and its relays in other parts of the prefecture. NBC already advised and advertised on their website that listeners can still listen to NBC Radio Saga on its Wide FM frequencies.
