= List of hāfu people =

Hāfu (ハーフ, "half") describes an individual who is either the child of one Japanese and one non-Japanese parent or, less commonly, two half Japanese parents. Because the term is specific to individuals of ethnic Japanese (Yamato) ancestry, individuals whose Japanese ancestry is not of ethnic Japanese origin, such as Zainichi Koreans (e.g. Crystal Kay Williams and Kiko Mizuhara) will not be listed. This list is only for notable Hāfu.

== Academics, science, and technology ==
- Eugenie Clark (1922–2015), American ichthyologist (American father)
- Kusumoto Ine (1827–1903), Japanese physician (German father)
- Edwin McClellan (1925–2009), British Japanologist (British father)
- Shinichi Mochizuki (born 1969), Japanese mathematician (American mother)
- Marie Morisawa (1919–1994), American geomorphologist (American mother)
- Jang-choon "Nagaharu U" Woo (1898–1959), Korean-Japanese botanist (Korean father)
- Christian van Nieuwerburgh, (born 1971), Belgian professor of coaching and positive psychology, based in the United Kingdom (Belgian father)
- Samaya Nissanke, British astrophysicist (Sri Lankan father)
- Marian Irwin Osterhout (1888–1973), American plant physiologist (American father)
- Charles John "Yoshio" Pedersen (1904–1989), American organic chemist and recipient of the Nobel Prize in Chemistry (Norwegian father)
- Lauren Williams (born c. 1978), American mathematician (American father)

== Arts and architecture ==
- Ruben A. Aquino (born 1953), Filipino Japanese American character animator (Filipino father)
- Shane Keisuke Berkery (born 1992), Irish-Japanese artist (Irish father)
- Simon Fujiwara (born 1982), English artist (British mother)
- Dan Liu, Canadian fashion designer/artist (Chinese (Hong Kong) mother)
- MariNaomi, American graphic artist and cartoonist (European American father)
- Jun Nguyen-Hatsushiba (born 1968), Japanese Vietnamese artist (Vietnamese father)
- Luis Nishizawa (1918–2014), Mexican artist (Mexican mother)
- Isamu Noguchi (1904–1988), American artist and child of Léonie Gilmour and Yone Noguchi (European American mother)
- Marjorie Pigott (1904–1990), Canadian watercolor artist (English father)
- Masato Seto, Japanese photographer (Vietnamese Thai mother)
- Sputniko! (born 1985), Japanese artist (British mother)
- Ashok Sukumaran, Indian contemporary artist (Indian father)
- Namiko Chan Takahashi, Singaporean painter (Peranakan father)
- Saya Woolfalk (born 1979), New Yorker artist (biracial American father)

== Business and economics ==
- Jason Gissing (born 1970), British businessman and founder of Ocado (English father)
- Reino Barack (born 1984), Indonesian businessman and producer (Indonesian father)

== Entertainers ==
=== Actors ===
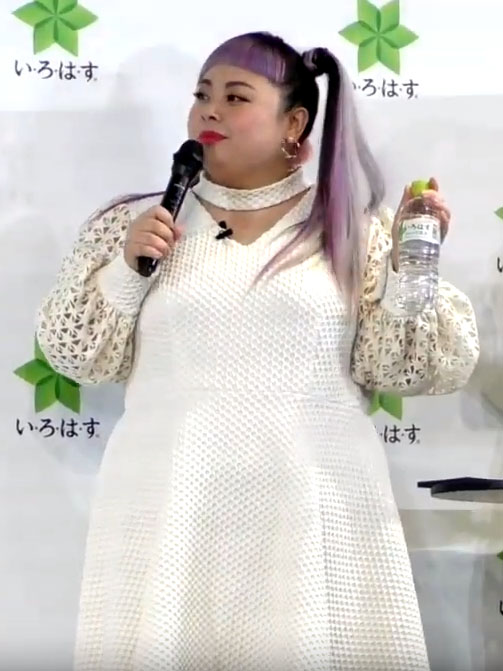
Naomi Watanabe, Japanese actress, comedian, and fashion designer

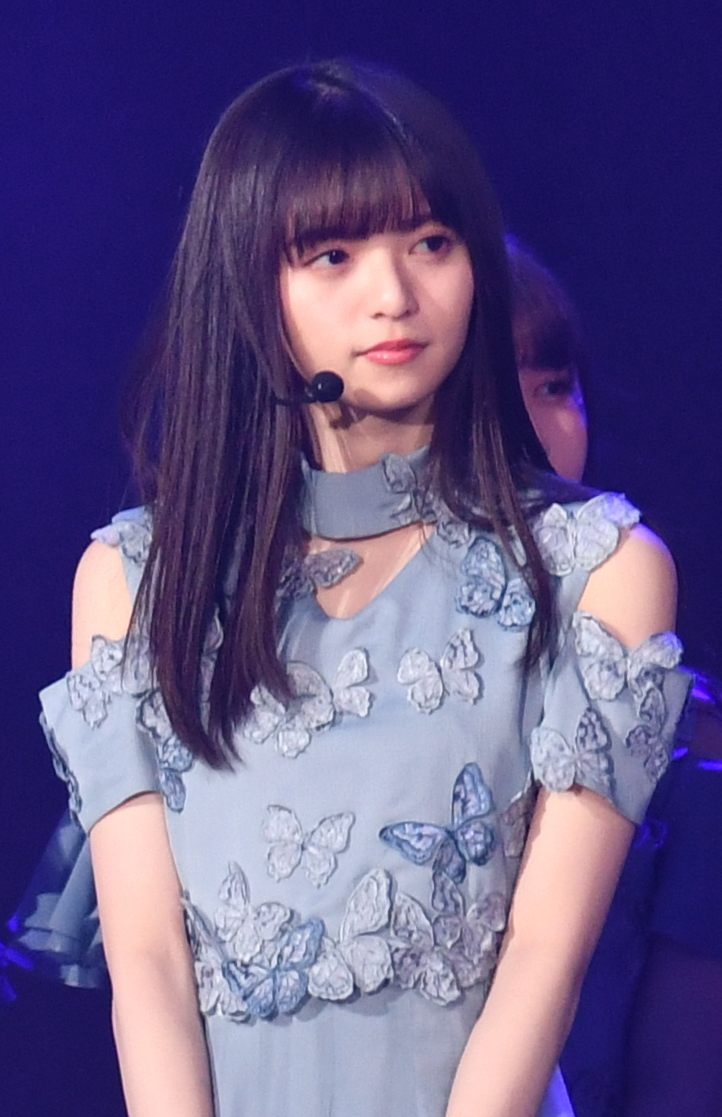
Asuka Saitō, Japanese actress, model, television presenter and former idol

- Fairouz Ai (born 1993) Japanese voice actress (Egyptian father)
- Elly Akira (born 1986), Japanese AV actress and photographer (Syrian father)
- Hayley Kiyoko Alcroft (born 1991), American actor and singer (White American father)
- Minami Bages (born 1986), Japanese actor (French father)
- Darren Barnet (born 1991), American actor (American father of German and Cherokee descent)
- Asia Carrera (born 1973), American former pornographic actress (German mother)
- Charlet Chung (born 1983), American actress (Korean father)
- Ian Anthony Dale (born 1978), American actor (American father)
- Romi Dames (born 1979), Japanese-American actress and voice actress (Jewish American father)
- Natsuki Deguchi (born 2001), Japanese actress (Chinese mother)
- Ureo Egawa (1902–1970), Japanese actor (German father)
- Maya Erskine (born 1987), American actress (European American father is Peter Erskine)
- Yu Shirota Fernández (born 1985), Japanese actor and singer (Spanish mother)
- Christopher Sean Friel (born 1985), American actor (White American father)
- Ayako Fujitani (born 1979), Japanese actress (White American father)
- Kimiko Glenn, (born 1989), American actress (European American father)
- Jeananne Goossen (born 1985), Canadian actress (Canadian father)
- Kenji Haga (born 1961), Japanese tarento and actor (American father)
- Emily Hatoyama (born 1955), Japanese former actor (Australian father)
- Janet Hatta, Japanese actress (American father)
- Amy Hill (born 1953), American actor and comedian (Finnish American father)
- Tae Hitoto (born 1970), Japanese actress (Taiwanese father)
- Nico Hiraga (born 1997), American actor and skateboarder (French American mother)
- Lalla Hirayama (born 1988), South African television host, actress, dancer and model (Father is South African, mother is Japanese).
- Hiroyuki Ikeuchi (born 1976), Japanese actor (Salvadorian mother)
- Stacy Kamano (born 1974), American actress (European American mother)
- Yuki Kato (born 1993), Indonesian actress (Japanese father)
- Andrew Koji (born 1987), British actor (English mother)
- Louis Kurihara (born 1994), Japanese tarento and actor (British father)
- Masao Kusakari (born 1952), Japanese actor and model (American father)
- Nobuo Kyo (born 1979), Japanese actor (Zainichi Korean descent)
- James Hiroyuki Liao (born 1985), American actor (Taiwanese father, Japanese mother)
- Mara Lopez (born 1991), Filipina actress and surfer (Filipina mother)
- Jiro Manio (born 1992), Filipino actor (Filipina mother)
- Yūsaku Matsuda (1949–1989), Japanese actor (Zainichi Korean mother)
- Eleanor Matsuura (born 1983), Japanese-born British actress (English mother)
- Siti Nur Syatilla binti Amirol Melvin (born 1991), Malaysian actor and model (Malay mother)
- Rie Miyazawa (born 1973), Japanese actress and former fashion model and singer (Dutch father)
- Emma Miyazawa (born 1988), Japanese actress and former fashion model and singer (American father, Japanese mother)
- Sarah Miyazawa LaFleur, American businesswoman and fashion designer (American father, Japanese mother)
- Sonoya Mizuno (born 1986), British actor and ballet dancer (Argentine mother)
- Maria Mori (born 1956), Japanese actress and singer (American FBI agent father)
- Noémie Nakai (born 1990), Japanese actor-director (French mother)
- Philip Nozuka (born 1987), Canadian actor (Canadian mother)
- Naomi J. Ogawa (born 1996), British actress (English father, Japanese mother)
- Masumi Okada (1935–2006), Japanese actor (Danish mother)
- Atsuko Okatsuka (born 1987), Taiwanese-American comedian and actress (Taiwanese mother)
- Louis Ozawa Changchien (born 1975), American actor (Japanese mother, Taiwanese father)
- Maria Ozawa (born 1986), Japanese AV idol (French Canadian father)
- Ryan Potter (born 1995), American actor (Jewish American mother)
- Greg Roskowski (fl. 1950s–1960s), Polish announcer for Radio Ceylon (Polish father)
- Nichole Sakura (born 1989), American actor (Irish American father)
- Erika Sawajiri (born 1986), Japanese actor and singer (Algerian Kabyle mother)
- Will Sharpe (born 1986), English actor, writer, and director (Japanese mother)
- Alan Shirahama (born 1993), Japanese actor and DJ (Filipino mother)
- Matthias von Stegmann (born 1968), German actor and stage director (German father)
- Booboo Stewart (born 1994), American actor (American father of Russian, Scottish and Blackfoot descent)
- Fivel Stewart (born 1996), American actor and singer (American father of Russian, Scottish and Blackfoot descent)
- María Eugenia Suárez (born 1992), Argentine actress, singer and model (Japanese mother)
- Daniele Suzuki (born 1977), Brazilian actress (Brazilian mother of German, Italian, and indigenous descent)
- Maryjun Takahashi (born 1987), Japanese actress and model (Filipino mother)
- Yu Takahashi (born 1993), Japanese actress and model (Filipino mother)
- Tina Tamashiro (born 1997), Japanese actress and model (American father)
- Kazunori Tani (born 1985), Japanese actor (American father)
- Brian Tee (born Jae-Beom Takata; 1977), American actor (Japanese American father, South Korean mother)
- Mayuka Thaïs (born 1979), American actor and singer-songwriter (European American mother is Teri Suzanne)
- Reina Triendl (born 1992) Japanese actress, model, and tarento (Austrian father)
- Naomi Watanabe (born 1987), Japanese actress, comedian, and fashion designer (Taiwanese mother)
- Jennifer Wooden (born 1995), Japanese TV announcer for Akita Broadcasting System (Australian father)
- James Yaegashi, Japanese American actor (American mother)
- Kimiko Yo (born 1956), Japanese actress (Hakka Taiwanese father)
- Keone Young (born 1947), American actor (Chinese father)
- Tina Yuzuki (born 1986), Japanese actress, singer and former AV idol (Portuguese mother)

=== Directors, filmmakers and producers ===
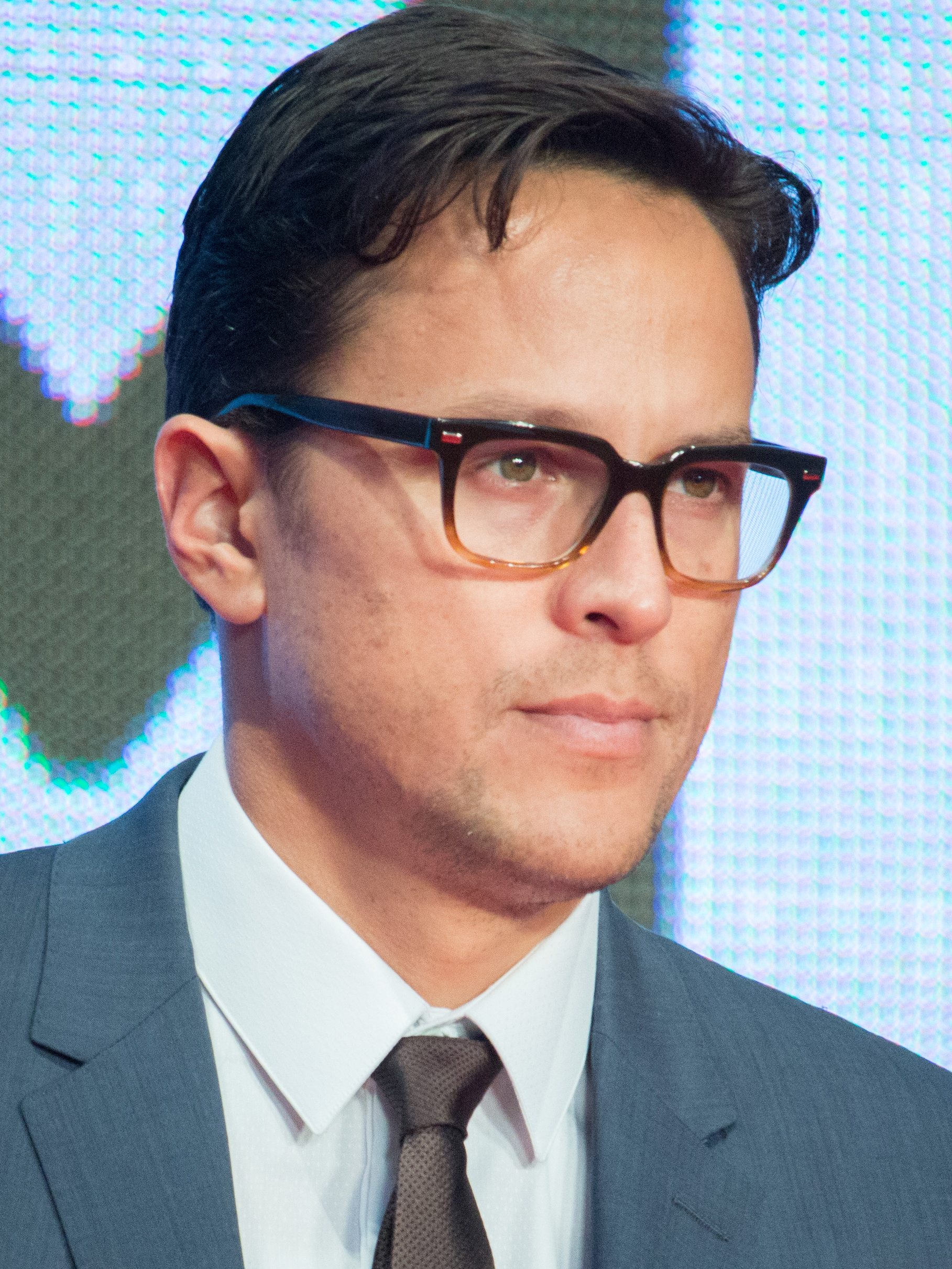
Cary Joji Fukunaga, American film director

- Destin Daniel Cretton, American filmmaker
- Cary Joji Fukunaga (born 1977), American film director and screenwriter (Swedish American mother)
- Naomi Iizuka (born 1965), American playwright (Latina American parent)
- Shiori Itō (born 1989), Japanese Journalist, filmmaker (Caucasian father)
- Karyn Kiyoko Kusama (born 1968), American filmmaker (American parent)
- Satsuki Mitchell (born 1979), American film producer, former Bond Girl previously engaged to Daniel Craig (Caucasian father)
- Diane Paulus (born 1966), American stage director (New Yorker father)
- Joe Rinoie (born 1960), Japanese music producer (Han Chinese parent)
- Yoichi Sai (1949-2022), Japanese film director (Zainichi Korean parent)

=== Models and beauty queens ===
- Devon Aoki (born 1982), American fashion model and daughter of Hiroaki Aoki (European American mother)
- Elena Ashmore, reality show star (Australian father)
- Nicole Fujita (born 1998), Japanese model and tarento (European New Zealander father)
- Rina Fukushi (born 1999), Japanese model (Filipina-Spanish mother)
- Marie Helvin (born 1952), American fashion model (European American parent)
- Yo Hitoto (born 1976), Japanese pop singer (Taiwanese parent)
- Saya Ichikawa (born 1987), Japanese model, tarento and newscaster (American parent with Cherokee blood)
- Elaiza Ikeda (born 1996), Japanese model and actress (Spanish Filipina parent)
- Juliana Imai (born 1985) Brazilian model (Euro-Brazilian mother)
- Joy (born 1985), Japanese fashion model and TV personality (English parent)
- Liza Kennedy (born 1989), Japanese fashion model (Scottish-German father)
- Eimi Kuroda (born 1988), Japanese fashion model (English parent)
- Maggy (1992), Japanese model and tarento (Scottish Canadian father)
- Rika Mamiya (born 1992), Japanese fashion model (Filipina parent)
- Ariana Miyamoto (born 1994), Japanese beauty pageant contestant and first hāfu to win Miss Universe Japan in 2015 (African American parent)
- Erena Mizusawa (born 1992), Japanese actor and model (Korean parent)
- Izumi Mori (born 1982), Japanese model and tarento (Italian American parent)
- Ayami Nakajo (born 1997), Japanese model (British father)
- Manami Oku (born 1995), Japanese idol and member of AKB48 (Italian parent)
- Rina Ōta (born 1988), Japanese model (Russian parent)
- Kana Oya (born 1987), Brazilian Japanese model (Brazilian parent)
- Rola (born 1990), Japanese fashion model and tarento (Bangladeshi father)
- Roxana Saberi (born 1977), American beauty queen and journalist (Iranian father)
- Sheila (born 1973), Japanese model (Cuban parent)
- Priyanka Yoshikawa (born 1994), Japanese beauty pageant contestant and Miss World Japan 2016 (Bengali parent)
- Elli Rose (Arakawa), (born 1986), Japanese fashion model, DJ and producer (British mother)
- Marlon Teixeira (born 1991), is a Brazilian fashion model and actor (Japanese mother) (Note: Some English sources have stated that Marlon is of Portuguese, Japanese and Indian descent. The ambiguous meaning of the word "Indian" in English has led some of his fans to believe that one or more of his ancestors originated from India. In Portuguese such ambiguity is nonexistent, since there are two words to convey the different meanings: índio for an American Indian (or Amerindian, including Native Brazilians); and indiano for people and things related to India.)

=== Musicians and singers ===
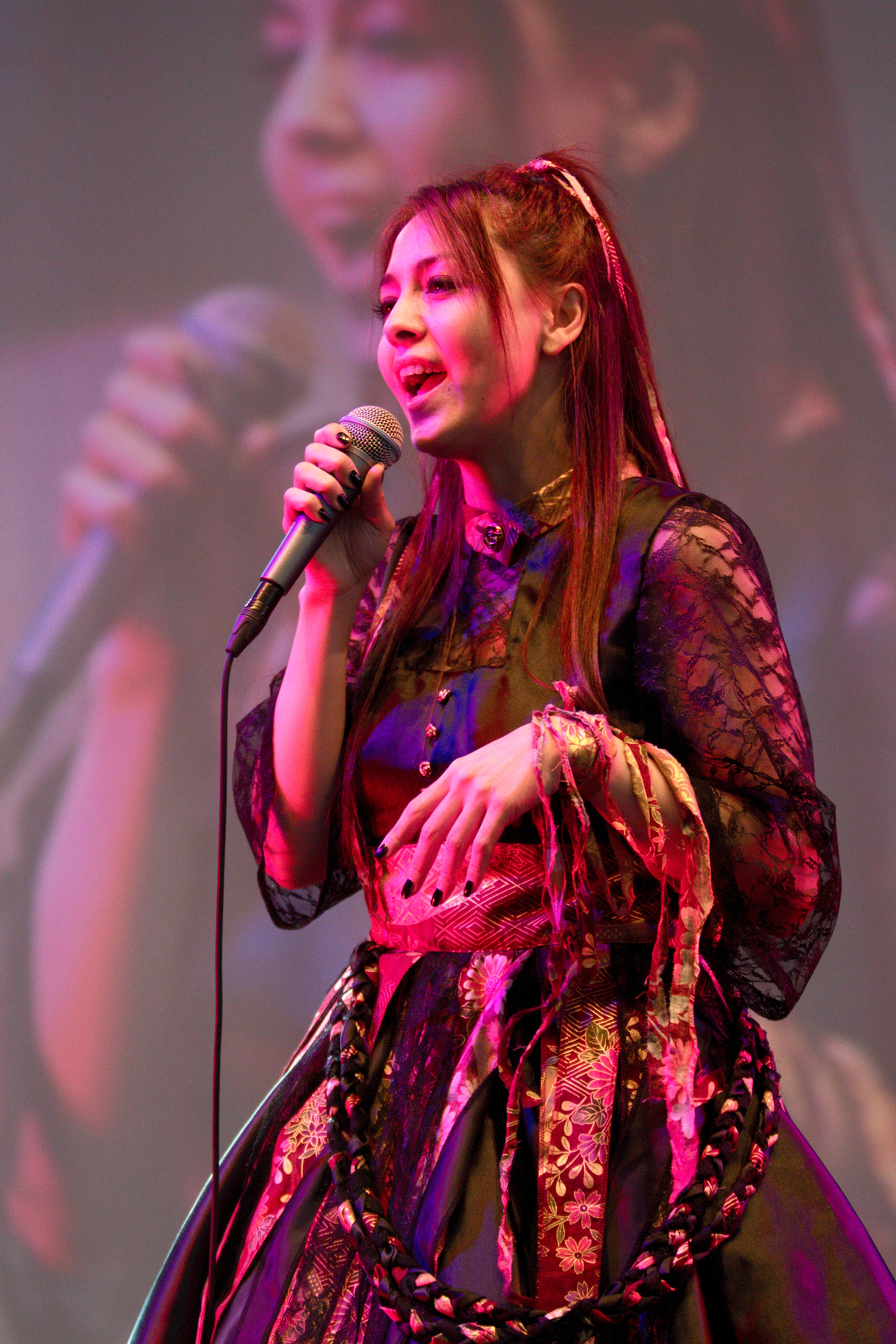
Anza Ohyama, Japanese singer

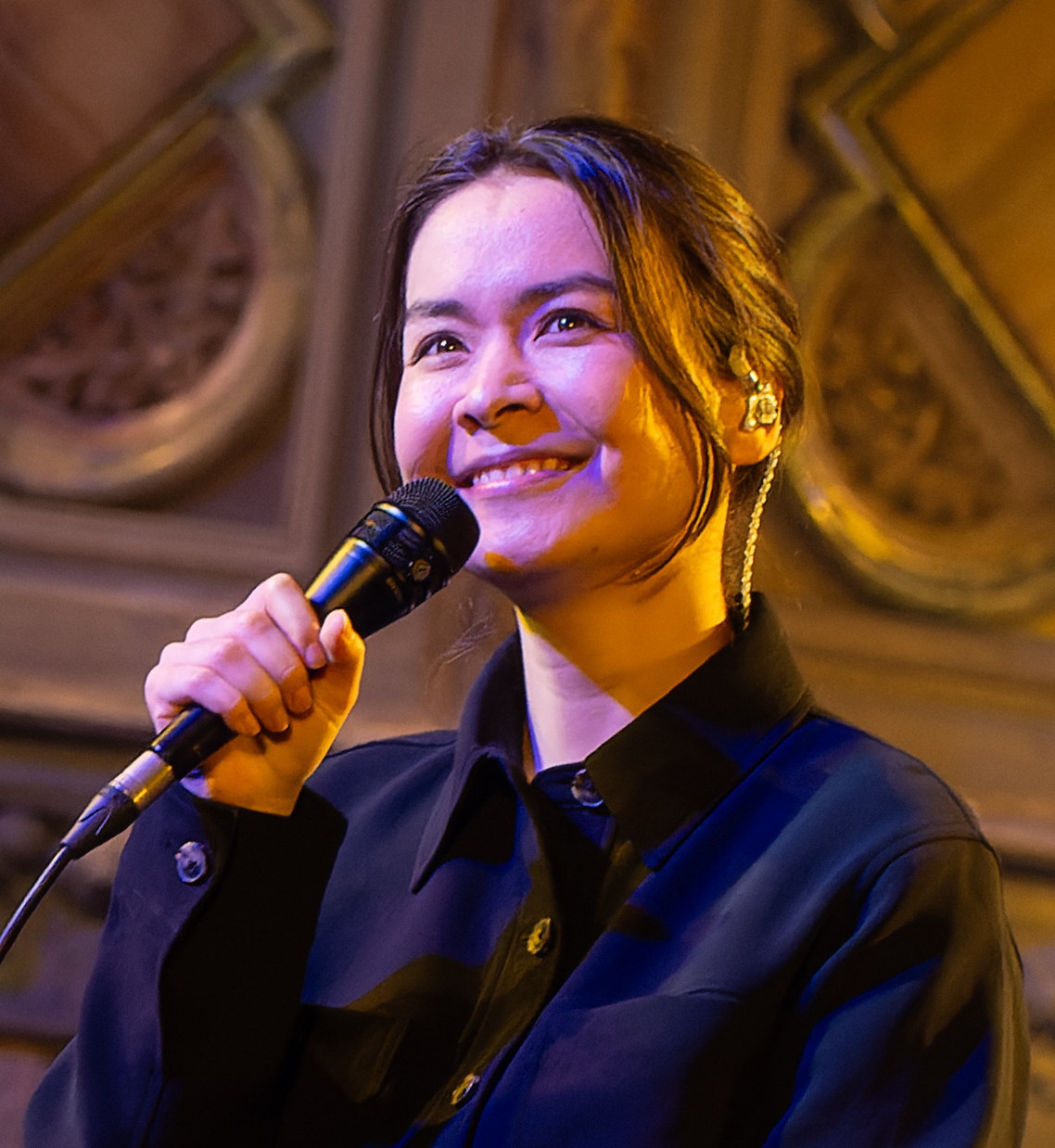
Mitski, American singer

- Kiyomi Angela Aki (born 1977), Japanese singer (Italian-American mother)
- Sayaka Akimoto (born 1988), Japanese television host and singer (Filipino mother)
- Kunimi Andrea (born 1977), American singer-actress (European American mother is Teri Suzanne)
- Celeina Ann (born 1996), Japanese singer-songwriter (American mother)
- Beni, Japanese R&B singer (European-American parent)
- Miki Berenyi (born 1967), English singer-songwriter and musician (Hungarian father)
- Hisham Bharoocha (born 1976), American musician (Lightning Bolt, Black Dice and Soft Circle) (Burmese father)
- Anthony Brown, jazz musician (Choctaw/African-American parent)
- Mark de Clive-Lowe, New Zealand musician and composer (New Zealander father)
- Marié Digby (born 1983), American singer-songwriter and musician (Irish American father)
- Duran (born 1984), Japanese musician (Filipino father)
- Elly, Japanese rapper and actor (American father)
- Friday Night Plans (born 1996), Japanese singer (Filipina mother)
- Hiromi Hayakawa (1982–2017) Mexican singer (Japanese descent father)
- Nic Endo (born 1976), Japanese-German-American noise musician and member of Atari Teenage Riot (German parent)
- Miya Folick (born 1989), American singer-songwriter (Japanese mother)
- Jerry Fujio (born 1940), Japanese singer, actor and tarento (British mother)
- Yoshie Fujiwara (1898–1976), Japanese singer (Scottish father)
- Eric Fukusaki (born 1991), Peruvian Japanese singer (Chinese Peruvian parent)
- Giselle (born 2000) South Korean singer-rapper, member of girlgroup aespa (Korean mother)
- Conan Gray (born 1998), American singer-songwriter (American father)
- Amy Harvey (born 2002), Japanese singer and rapper of Japanese girl group XG (Australian father)
- Hinata (born 2000) Japanese singer of Japanese girl group XG (Korean parent)
- May "May J." Hashimoto (born 1988), Japanese singer (Iranian mother)
- Masato Hayakawa, Japanese musician and lead vocal of Coldrain (American mother).
- Matt Heafy (born 1986), American musician (White American father)
- Ingrid Fuzjko Hemming (born 1932), Swedish pianist (Russo-Swedish father)
- Judith Hill, American singer-songwriter (African-American parent)
- Iconiq (born 1984), Japanese Korean singer (Zainichi Korean parent)
- Suzee Ikeda, American singer (American parent)
- Takamasa "Miyavi" Ishihara (born 1981), Japanese singer-songwriter and musician (Korean father)
- Yuna Ito (born 1983), American-born Japanese singer and actress (Korean parent)
- Jay'ed (born 1981), Japanese R&B singer-songwriter (Samoan-Māori mother)
- Koh Gabriel Kameda (born 1975), German violinist (German mother)
- Rie Kaneko (born 1997), Japanese gravure idol and member of Ladybaby (Spanish Filipina parent)
- Takeshi Kaneshiro (born 1973), Taiwanese-Japanese actor and singer (Taiwanese mother)
- Kangnam (born 1987), Korean-Japanese singer and television personality (Korean parent)
- Oki Kano (born 1957), Japanese musician (Ainu father)
- Freddy Kempf (born 1977), British pianist (German parent)
- Sean Kennard (born 1984), American pianist (American father)
- Rie Kaela Kimura (born 1984), Japanese singer (British parent)
- Kylee (born 1994), Japanese singer (British American parent)
- Jake E. Lee (born 1957), American musician (White American father)
- Sean Ono Lennon (born 1975), American musician and child of Yoko Ono and English musician John Lennon
- Ann Lewis (born 1956), Japanese singer (American parent)
- Likiya, Japanese musician (The Rampage from Exile Tribe) (American father)
- LISA (born 1974), Japanese singer (Colombian parent)
- Ken Lloyd (born 1976), British musician and singer-songwriter (English father)
- Olivia Lufkin (born 1979), Japanese-American singer-songwriter (American father)
- Caroline Lufkin (born 1981), Japanese-American singer-songwriter (American father)
- MAA (born 1986), Japanese singer (American father)
- Nina Makino-Hillman (born 2005) Japanese singer, member of girlgroup NiziU (American father)
- Iwamoto Mari (1926–1979), Japanese violinist (American mother)
- Emi Maria (born 1987), Japanese Papua New Guinean R&B singer-songwriter (Papua New Guineas parent)
- Emi Meyer (born 1987), Japanese American jazz singer-songwriter (American parent)
- Anne Akiko Meyers (born 1970), American violinist (American parent)
- MiChi (born 1985), Japanese British singer (English father)
- Joji Kusunoki Miller (born 1993), Japanese singer-songwriter, former internet personality (Australian father)
- Mitski Miyawaki (born 1990), American singer-songwriter and musician (American father)
- Anna Murashige (born 1998), Japanese singer (Russian mother)
- Bobby Murray, American electric blues musician-songwriter (Irish father)
- Yukimi Eleanora Nagano (born 1982), Swedish singer-songwriter (Swedish American parent)
- Kaito Nakahori (born 1989), Chinese-Japanese composer
- Maiko Rivera Nakamura (born 1991), Japanese singer (Spanish Filipino parent)
- George Nozuka (born 1986), Canadian-American R&B singer (Canadian parent)
- Justin Nozuka (born 1988), Canadian-American singer-songwriter (Canadian parent)
- John Ken Nuzzo (born 1966), Italian tenor (Italian-American parent)
- Chieko Ochi (born 1987), Japanese singer and actress (Filipina parent)
- Keisuke Ogihara (born 1975), Japanese hip hop singer (Finnish parent)
- Anza Ohyama (born 1976), Japanese actor and singer (White South African parent)
- Alice Sara Ott (born 1988), Japanese pianist (German father)
- Mona Asuka Ott (born 1991), German pianist (German father)
- Patty (born 1960), Japanese singer and tarento (American father)
- Sarah Midori Perry (born 1991), British Japanese singer with Kero Kero Bonito (British parent)
- Pile (born 1988), Japanese singer and seiyu (Korean mother)
- Ib Riad (born 1985), Japanese musician, member of Alexandros (Egyptian father)
- Asuka Saito (born 1998), Japanese singer and actress (Burmese mother)
- Sandii, Japanese musician (American parent)
- Mary Sara (born 1986), Japanese model and singer (American father)
- Rikako Sasaki (born 2001), Japanese singer (Filipino parent)
- Noah Sebastian (born 1995), American singer with Bad Omens
- Ayana Shahab (born 1997), Indonesian singer (Arab Indonesian father)
- Laura Shigihara, American singer-songwriter and video game developer (Japanese father, French American mother)
- Anis Shimada (born 1975), one-half of Monoral (Moroccan-French parent)
- Michael "Mike" Shinoda (born 1977), American musician and co-founder of the rock band Linkin Park (American parent)
- Shoo (born 1981) South Korean actress and singer (Korean parent)
- Sika (born 1995), Japanese singer, former member of Fanatics (Chinese parent)
- Keiko (born 2005), Japanese rapper-singer of Japanese girlgroup ME:i (Korean Father)
- SoulJa, Japanese hip hop singer-songwriter (Belgian parent)
- Arabella Steinbacher (born 1981), German classical violinist (German father)
- Fernanda Takai (born 1971), Brazilian singer (Portuguese Brazilian mother)
- Masayoshi Takanaka (born 1953), Japanese guitarist (Chinese father)
- Stephanie Nonoshita Topalian (born 1987), American singer (Armenian American parent)
- Visava Thaiyanont (born 1990), Thai Japanese actor and musician (Thai father)
- Towkio (born 1993), American rapper (Mexican parent)
- Reina Triendl (born 1992), Japanese actor and tarento (Austrian parent)
- Anna Tsuchiya (born 1984), Japanese singer (Polish American parent)
- Kenta Tsuchiya (born 1990), member of Thai boy band K-Otic (Thai parent)
- Anna-Catherine "Uffie" Hartley (born 1987), American singer-songwriter (English father)
- Akeo Watanabe (1919–1990), Japanese symphonic conductor (Finnish parent)
- Eiji Wentz (born 1985), Japanese actor and singer (German American parent)
- Wise (born 1979), Japanese rapper (American parent)
- Alissa Yagi (born 1995), Japanese model and actress (French parent)
- Rachael Yamagata (born 1977), American singer-songwriter and pianist (Japanese American father)
- Linda Yamamoto (born 1951), Japanese singer (American Korean War casualty father)
- Rei Yasuda (born 1993), Japanese singer and model (Michigander parent)
- Jiang Ying (musician) (born 1919), Chinese opera singer (Chinese father)
- Christine Yoshikawa, Canadian American pianist (Canadian parent)
- Diana Yukawa, British violinist and daughter of Japan Air Lines Flight 123 victim Akihisa Yukawa (English mother)

=== Personalities, presenters, tarento ===
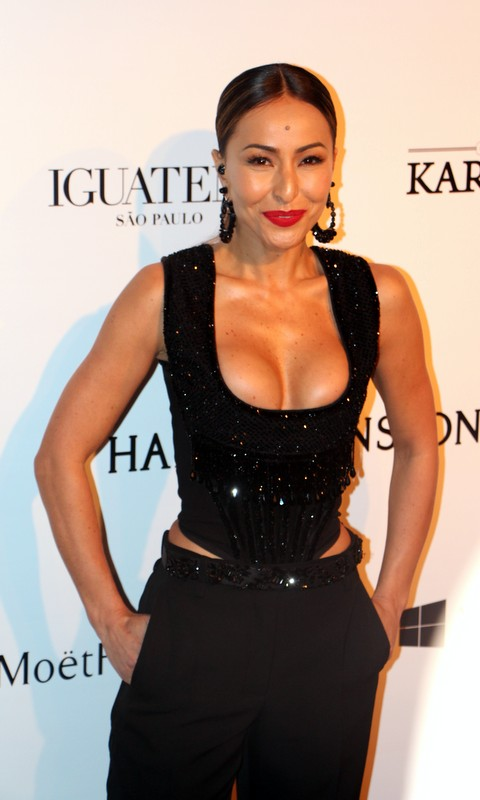
Sabrina Sato Rahal, Brazilian TV presenter

- Polpat Asavaprapha, Thai fashion designer and TV personality (Thai father)
- Joey "The Anime Man" Bizinger (born 1994), Japanese-Australian YouTuber and voice actor (Australian father)
- Chen Kenichi (born 1956), Japanese chef known as one of the chefs in Iron Chef (Chinese father of Japanese nationality)
- Chris Cheng (born 1979), American reality show champion (Chinese American parent)
- Salvatore Cuomo (born 1972), Japanese celebrity chef (Italian parent)
- DJ Heavygrinder, American disk jockey (French American parent)
- Tenka Hashimoto (born 1993), Japanese tarento (Chinese parent)
- Maya Higa (born 1998), conservationist and streamer (American mother)
- Lalla Hirayama (born 1988), South African actress and personality (Jewish South African father)
- Carrie Ann Inaba (born 1968), dance competition judge
- Iwa Moto (born 1988), Filipina reality television contestant (Filipina mother)
- Yuki Kimura (born 1996), Japanese model and tarento (half Filipino/half Spanish parent)
- Christel Masami Takigawa Lardux (born 1977), Japanese television presenter (French parent)
- LiLiCo (born 1970), Swedish Japanese personality (Swedish father)
- Loveli (born 1989), Japanese model and tarento (Filipino parent)
- Dharshan Munidasa (born 1970), Sri Lankan celebrity chef (Sri Lankan father)
- Helen Nishikawa (born 1946), Japanese TV presenter (American father)
- David Ono, American news anchor for KABC-TV (Caucasian father)
- Rebecca "Becky" Rabone (born 1984), Japanese tarento (British parent)
- Sabrina Sato Rahal (born 1981), Brazilian reality show participant, model and television presenter (Swiss-Lebanese father)
- Akiko Thomson (born 1974), Filipina television host, journalist and swimmer (American father)
- Anna Umemiya (born 1972), Japanese personality and model (American parent)
- Shaula Vogue (born 1986), American fashion model and TV personality (European-American father)
- Yashiki Takajin (1949–2014), Japanese singer and television personality (Zainichi Issei father)
- Zawachin (born 1992), Japanese personality (Filipina parent)

=== Voice actors ===
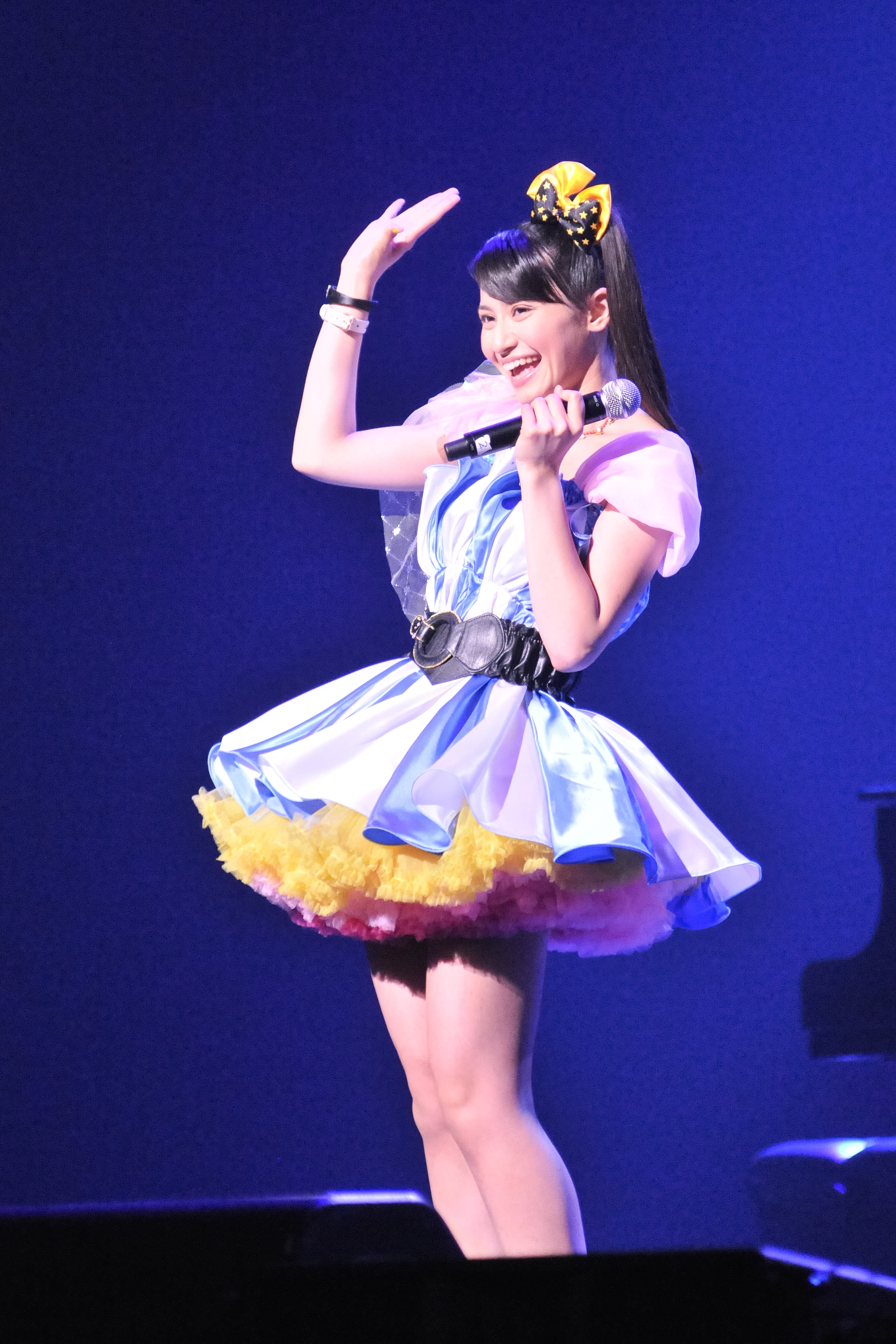
Megumi Nakajima, Japanese seiyū

- Sarah Emi Bridcutt (born 1989), Japanese seiyū (Australian father)
- Fairouz Ai (born 1993), Japanese seiyū (Egyptian father)
- Mark Ishii (born 1991), Japanese seiyuu (Filipino mother)
- Subaru Kimura (born 1990), Japanese seiyū (German parent)
- Lynn, Japanese seiyū (American father/ Brazilian mother)
- Megumi Nakajima (born 1989), Japanese seiyū (Filipino parent)
- Shū Uchida (born 1996), Japanese seiyū (Australian parent)
- Naomi Payton (born 2003), Japanese seiyū (American father)
- Sally Amaki (born 2000), American raised in Japan seiyū (American parent)
- Akina Houmoto (born 1996), Japanese seiyū (Chinese mother)
- Hana Hishikawa (born 2003), Japanese seiyū (Chinese mother)

=== Others ===
- Nicola Formichetti (born 1977), Japanese fashion director (Italian father)
- Ailes Gilmour (1912–1993), Japanese-American dancer (American mother)
- Hannah O'Neill (born 1993), New Zealander ballet dancer (New Zealand father)
- Sono Osato (1919–2018), American dancer (White Canadian parent)
- Ruth Sato (1904–1992), American performer at Vaudeville (Irish parent)
- Mandy Sekiguchi (born 1991), Japanese dancer (Nigerian parent)
- Cyril Takayama (born 1973), American magician (Moroccan French parent)

== Literature and authors ==
- Margaret Dilloway, American author (American father)
- Karl Taro Greenfeld (born 1964), American journalist-writer (Jewish American father)
- Kimiko Hahn (born 1955), American poet (German American father)
- María Kodama (1937–2023), Argentine writer (Japanese father)
- Candice Kumai, American author and chef (Polish American parent)
- Anna Ogino (born 1956), Japanese author and academic (French American father)
- Milton K. Ozaki (1913–1989), Japanese American writer (American parent)
- Christine Piper (born 1979), Australian author (Australian father)
- Nina Revoyr (born 1969), American novelist (Polish American parent)
- Tabitha Suzuma (born 1975), British writer (English parent)
- Gail Tsukiyama, American novelist (Chinese parent)
- Ken Uston (1935–1987), American author and card counter (Austrian mother)
- Leah Nanako Winkler, Japanese-American playwright (American father)
- Zheng Pingru (1918–1940), Chinese socialite and inspiration for Lust, Caution

== News and media ==
- Raymond H Boone (1938–2014), Pioneer African American Journalist (Japanese father)
- Ann Curry (born 1956), American TV journalist (English-Irish-American father)
- Sadakichi Hartmann (1867–1944), American art critic (German father)
- Miki Meek, American radio journalist (White American father)
- Mei Shigenobu (born in 1973 in Beirut, Lebanon), journalist with Palestinian father
- Yumi Stynes (born 1975), Japanese Australian media personality (fifth generation Australian father)
- Kumi Taguchi (born 1975), Australian journalist (Australian parent)

== Politics and law ==
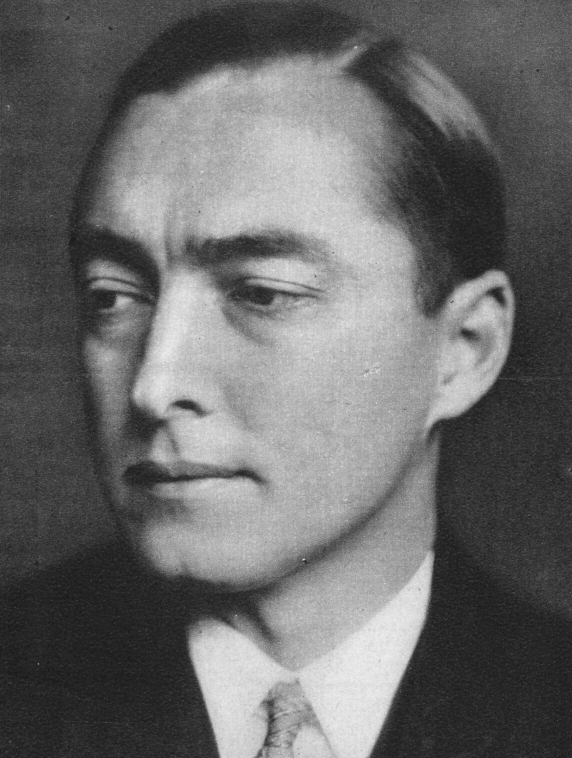
Richard von Coudenhove-Kalergi, Japanese-born Austrian politician

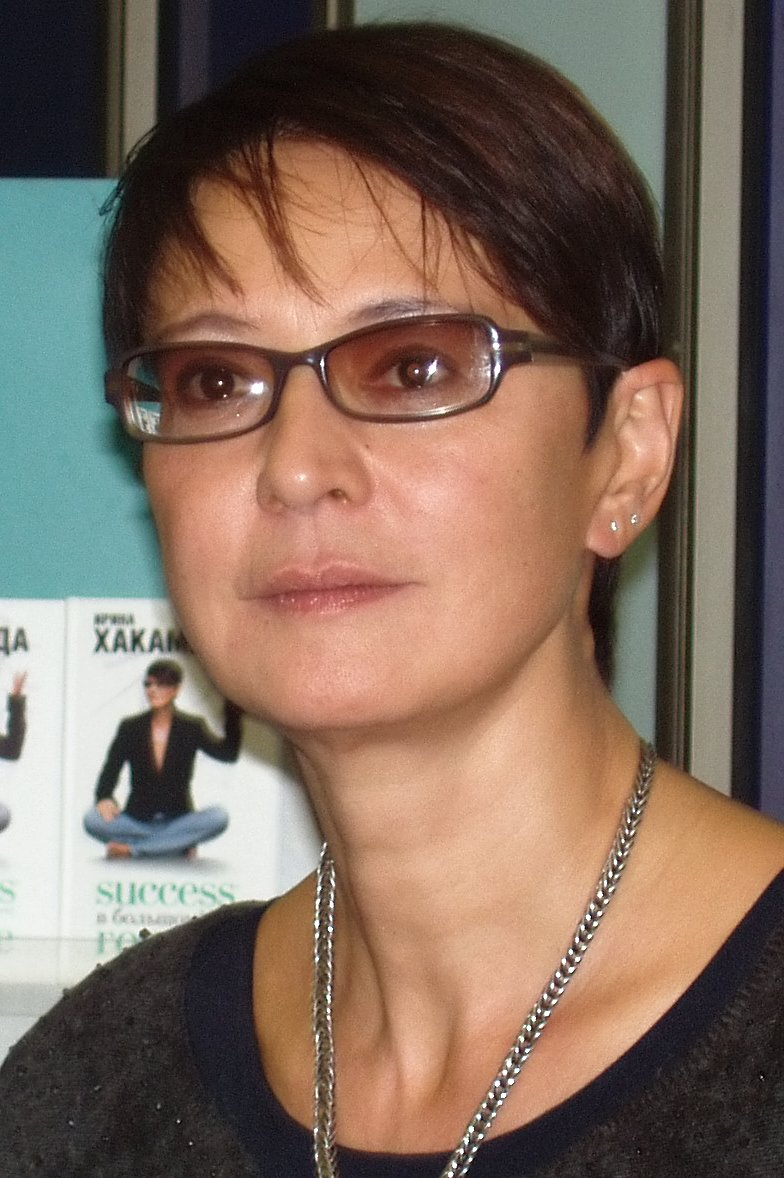
Irina Khakamada, Russian politician

- Chiang Wei-kuo (1916–1997), Kuomintang figure and adopted son of Chiang Kai-shek (Chinese father)
- Richard Nikolaus Eijiro von Coudenhove-Kalergi (1894–1972), naturalized French Austrian nobleman and founder of the Paneuropean Union (Austro-Hungarian father)
- Joey Gibson (born 1983), American political activist (Irish American father)
- Shinkun Haku (born 1958), Japanese politician and member of House of Councillors (South Korean father)
- Bruce Harrell (born 1958), Mayor of Seattle, Washington USA (African American father)
- Harry B. Harris Jr. (born 1956), American diplomat and U.S. Navy officer (American father)
- Irina Mutsuovna Khakamada (born 1955), Russian politician (Armenian-Russian mother)
- Ko Yong-hui (1952–2004), North Korean consort and mother of Kim Jong-un (Korean father)
- Liao Liou-yi (born 1947), Taiwanese politician (Taiwanese father)
- Endon Mahmood (1940–2005), Spouse of the Prime Minister of Malaysia (Malay father)
- Kinjiro Matsudaira (1885–1963), American inventor and politician (American mother)
- Renhō Murata (born Lien-fang Hsieh, 1967), Japanese politician (Taiwanese father)
- Masa Nakayama (1891–1976), Japanese politician (American father)
- Masao Nakayama (1941–2011), Micronesian politician and diplomat (Micronesian mother)
- Tosiwo Nakayama (1931–2007), President of the Federated States of Micronesia (Micronesian mother)
- Kimi Onoda (born 1982), Japanese politician (American father)
- Mariko Peters (born 1969), Dutch politician and member of the Tweede Kamer (Dutch parent)
- Naomi Ichihara Røkkum (born 1987), Norwegian politician in Oslo City Council (Norwegian parent)
- Dana Sabraw (born 1958), justice for the United States District Court for the Southern District of California (United States Army soldier parent)
- Kartika Sari Dewi Soekarnoputri (born 1967), daughter of President of Indonesia Sukarno (Indonesian father)
- Dennis "Denny" Tamaki (born 1959), Japanese politician (American father)

== Sports ==
=== Baseball ===
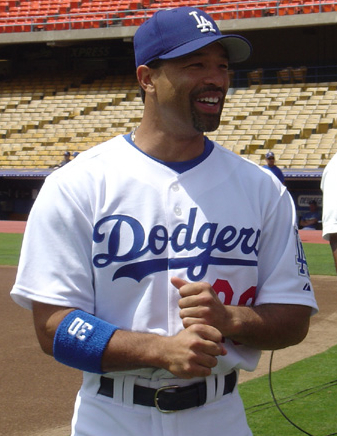
David "Dave" Roberts, American baseball player

- Farid Yu Darvishsefat (born 1986), Japanese baseball player (Iranian father)
- Jeremy Guthrie (born 1979), American baseball player (White American parent)
- Charlton Atlee Hammaker (born 1958), American MLB pitcher (German American parent)
- Keston Hiura (born 1996), American baseball player (Chinese mother)
- Hideki Irabu (1969–2011), Japanese baseball player (American parent)
- Kento Mark Ishida, Japanese professional baseball player (Belgian father)
- Travis Ishikawa (born 1983), American baseball player (White American parent)
- Shō Ishikawa (born 1999), Japanese baseball player (Filipina parent)
- Sachio Kinugasa, Japanese baseball player (African American parent)
- Steven Kwan (born 1997), American baseball player (Chinese father)
- Michael "Mike" Lum (born 1946), American baseball player (American parent)
- Micheal Yoshihide Nakamura (born 1976), Australian baseball player (Australian parent)
- Lars Nootbaar (born 1997), American baseball player (American father)
- Ryuya Ogawa (born 1991), Japanese baseball player (Filipino parent)
- Sadaharu Oh (born 1940), Chinese baseball player (Chinese parent)
- Louis Okoye (born 1997), Japanese baseball player (Igbo parent)
- Koji Ota (born 1952), Japanese baseball player (American father)
- David "Dave" Roberts (born 1972), American baseball player (African American parent)
- Chiaki Tone (born 1992), Japanese baseball player (Filipino mother)
- Yuki Udagawa (born 1998), Japanese baseball player (Filipina parent)
- Wilbur Donald "Don" Wakamatsu (born 1963), American baseball player (Irish American mother)
- Yasuaki Yamasaki (born 1992), Japanese baseball player (Filipino parent)
- Christian Yelich (born 1991), American baseball player (Serbian American father)

=== Basketball ===
- Rui Hachimura (born 1998), Japanese basketball player (Beninese parent)
- Takehiko Kanagoki (1914–1992), Japanese basketball player and Olympic Games contestant
- Michael Katsuhisa (born 1983), Japanese basketball player (American parent)
- Mucha Mori (born 1988), Japanese basketball player (Filipina parent)
- Avi Schafer (born 1998), is a Japanese-American professional basketball.
- Rex Walters (born 1970), American basketball player (white father)
- Bobby Webster (born 1984), American general manager of Toronto Raptors (American parent)

=== Footballers ===
- Shinta Appelkamp, German footballer (Japanese mother)
- Mio Backhaus, German footballer
- Keita Buwanika, Japanese footballer (Ugandan father)
- Robert Cullen, Japanese footballer (Irish father)
- Alan Davidson (born 1960), Australian soccer player (Australian parent)
- Jun Marques Davidson (born 1983), Japanese footballer (American father)
- Akira Silvano Disaro (born 1996), Japanese Italian footballer (Italian father)
- Mobi Fehr (born 1994), American soccer player (Swiss father)
- Joel Chima Fujita
- Cy Goddard (born 1997), Japanese footballer (English father)
- Hirokane Harima (born 1998), Hong Kong professional footballer (Chinese (Hong Kong) parent)
- Ariajasuru Hasegawa, Japanese footballer, Kurdish father
- Dan Howbert (born 1987), Japanese footballer (Liberian father)
- Stefan Daisuke Ishizaki (born 1982), Swedish footballer (Swedish parent)
- Arata Izumi (also known as Neelkanth Narendra Khambholja; born 1982), Indian Japanese footballer (Gujarati parent)
- Gabriel Kazu, Brazilian footballer (Italian-Brazilian mother)
- Colin Killoran (born 1992), Japanese footballer (Irish parent)
- Niall Killoran (born 1992), Japanese footballer (Irish parent)
- Riki Kitawaki (born 1985), Japanese footballer (Venezuelan parent)
- Leo Kokubo
- Ken Krolicki (born 1996), Japanese footballer (Polish American father)
- Andrew Kumagai, Japanese footballer, Sri Lankan Tamil father
- Issey Maholo, Japanese footballer (Congolese father)
- Daniel Matsunaga (born 1988), Brazilian footballer and actor (Brazilian mother of Portuguese, African, and indigenous descent)
- Daniel Matsuzaka (born 1997), English footballer (English parent)
- KennedyEgbus Mikuni (born 2000), Japanese footballer (Nigerian parent)
- Hikaru Minegishi (born 1991), Filipino footballer (Filipina parent)
- Michel Miyazawa (born 1963), Japanese footballer (French parent) add source
- Issey Nakajima-Farran (born 1984), Canadian soccer player (White Zimbabwean parent)
- Paris Nakajima-Farran (born 1989), Canadian soccer player (English Zimbabwean father)
- Boniface Nduka (born 1996), Japanese footballer (Nigerian father)
- Connor O'Toole (born 1987), Australian footballer (Irish father)
- Ado Onaiwu, Japanese footballer (Nigerian father)
- Satoshi Ōtomo (born 1981), Filipino Japanese footballer (Filipina parent)
- William Popp (born 1994), Japanese footballer (American parent)
- Gōtoku Sakai (born 1991), Japanese footballer (German parent)
- Daisuke Sato (born 1994), Filipino Japanese professional footballer (Filipina parent)
- Daniel Schmidt (born 1992), Japanese footballer (German American father)
- Junnosuke Schneider (born 1977), Japanese footballer (Swiss-German father)
- Ippei Shinozuka (born 1995), Japanese footballer (Russian parent)
- David Jiménez Silva (born 1986), Spanish footballer (Spanish father)
- Yuki Richard Stalph (born 1984), German footballer (German mother)
- Hannah Stambaugh, Japanese footballer (American father)
- Jelani Reshaun Sumiyoshi, Japanese footballer (American father)
- Musashi Suzuki (born 1994), Japanese footballer (Afro-Jamaican father)
- Zion Suzuki, Japanese footballer (Ghanaian father)
- Yuji Takahashi (born 1993), Japanese footballer (Filipino mother)
- Marcus Túlio Tanaka (born 1981), Brazilian footballer (Italian-Brazilian mother)
- Paulo Junichi Tanaka (born 1993), Japanese footballer (Filipino parent)
- Cayman Togashi (born 1993), Japanese footballer (Turkish American mother)
- Jiro Barriga Toyama (born 1995), Japanese Colombian footballer (Colombian father)
- Ryuji Utomo, Indonesian footballer (Indonesian Mother)
- Tando Velaphi (born 1987), Australian soccer player (Zimbabwean parent)
- Kayne Vincent (born 1988), New Zealand footballer (New Zealander parent)
- Pierce Waring (born 1998), Australian professional footballer (Australian father)
- Sai van Wermeskerken (born 1994), Japanese footballer (Dutch father)
- Louis Yamaguchi, Japanese footballer (French father)

=== Golf ===
- Pat Hurst (born 1969), American professional golfer (German-American father)
- Artemio Murakami (born 1983), Filipino professional golfer (Filipina parent)
- Haru Nomura (born 1992), Japanese golfer (Korean parent)
- Yuka Saso (born 2001), Filipino-born Japanese golfer (Filipina mother)
- Noboru Sugai (born 1949), Japanese golfer (Russian mother)

=== Ice skaters ===
- Ryuju Hino (born 1995), Japanese figure skater (Russian parent)
- Rika Hongo (born 1996), Japanese figure skater (British parent)
- Haruna Murakami (born 2008), Japanese ice dancer (Chinese (Hong-Kong) parent)
- Apolo Ohno (born 1982), American speed skater and Olympic medalist (White American parent)
- Allison Reed (born 1994), American ice dancer (American parent)
- Cathy Reed (born 1987), Japanese ice dancer (American parent)
- Chris Reed (1989 − 2020), Japanese ice dancer (American parent)
- Hana Bath (born 2010), Australian figure skater (Australian parent)
- Rio Nakata (born 2008) Japanese figure skater (Welsh parent)
- Kai Verbij (born 1994), Dutch speed skater (Dutch parent)
- Emi Watanabe (born 1959), Japanese figure skater (Filipina parent)

=== Judo and martial arts ===
- Mashu "Matthew" Baker (born 1994), Japanese judoka (American parent)
- Christa Deguchi (born 1995), Canadian judoka (Canadian parent)
- Tomohiko Hoshina (born 1987), Filipino-Japanese judoka (Filipina parent)
- Lyoto Machida (born 1978), Brazilian mixed martial artist (European Brazilian parent)
- Kodo Nakano (born 1993), Filipino judoka (Filipina parent)
- Ryu Shichinohe (born 1988), Japanese judoka (Belgian parent)
- Ricardo Suzuki (born 2000), Japanese taekwondo practitioner (Bolivian parent)
- Sergio Suzuki (born 1994), Japanese taekwondo practitioner (Bolivian parent)
- Kiyoshi Uematsu (born 1978), Spanish judoka (Spanish parent)
- Kiyomi Watanabe (born 1996), Japanese-Filipina judoka (Filipina mother)
- Don Wilson (born 1954), American kickboxer (American father)
- Aaron Wolf (born 1996), Japanese judoka (American father)

=== Sumo and professional wrestling ===
- Richard Blood Sr. (born 1953), American professional wrestler (English parent)
- Victor Blood (born 1960), American professional wrestler (English parent)
- Harry Masayoshi Fujiwara (1934-2016), American professional wrestler (Native Hawaiian parent)
- Satoshi Kamiyama (born 1997), Japanese sumo wrestler (Filipino parent)
- Tomoharu Kato (born 1990), Japanese sumo wrestler (Filipina parent)
- Hana Kimura (1997-2020), Japanese professional wrestler (Indonesian father)
- Syuri Kondo (born 1989), Japanese professional wrestler (Filipino parent)
- Eimi Gloria Matsudo (born 1994), Japanese professional wrestler (Italian father)
- Henry Armstrong Miller (1969–2026), sumo wrestler (African American father)
- Kōki Naya (1940–2013), Japanese sumo wrestler, 48th yokozuna (Ukrainian father)
- Hisashi Omichi (born 1992), Japanese sumo wrestler (Filipino mother)
- Erika Shishido (born 1970), Japanese wrestler (African American parent)
- Akira Takayasu (born 1990), Japanese sumo wrestler (Filipino mother)
- Ichiro Young (born 1998), Japanese sumo wrestler (African American father)
- Mitsuo Yoshida (born 1951), Japanese professional wrestler (Chungbuk Korean father)

=== Tennis ===
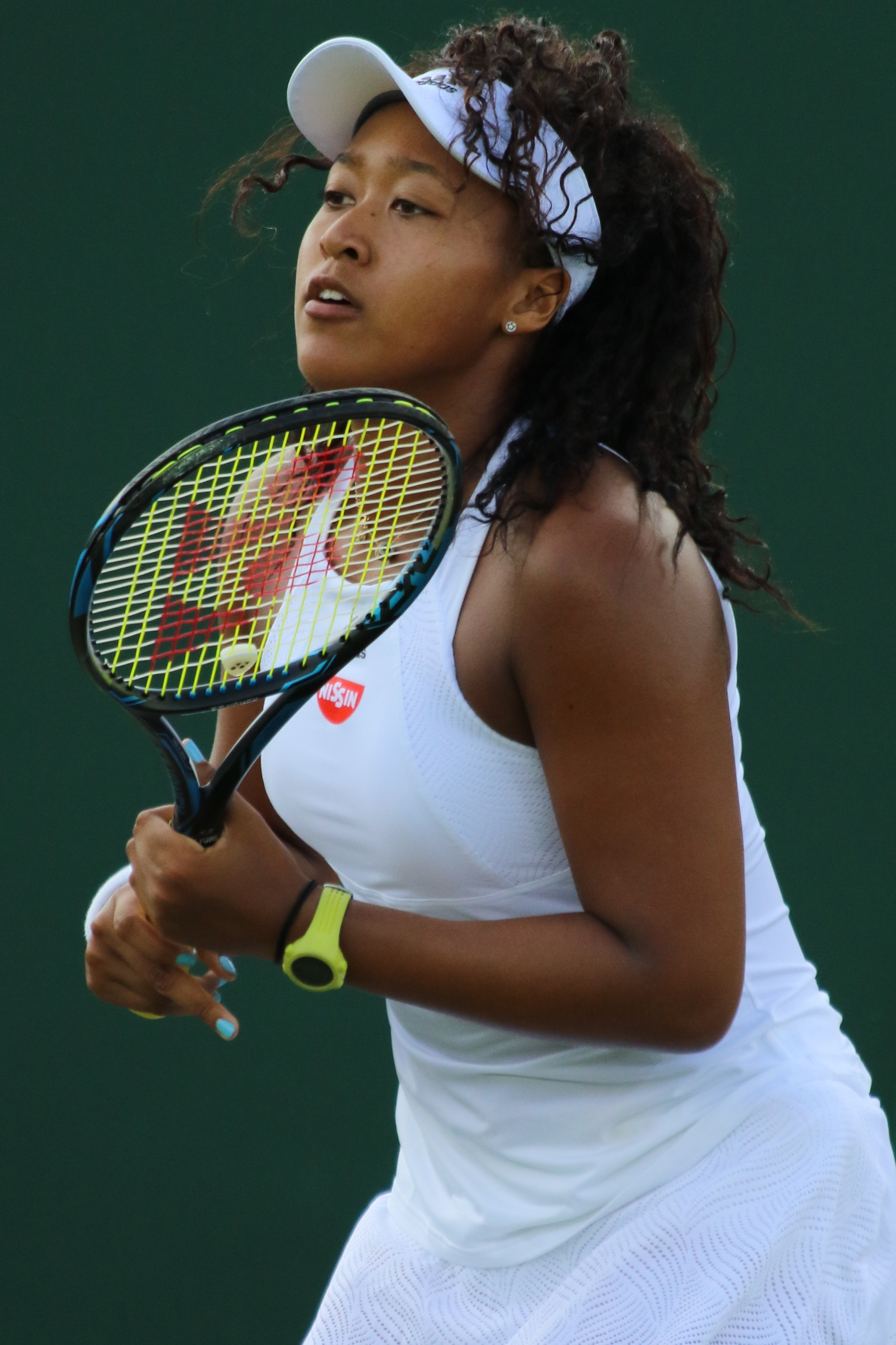
Naomi Osaka, Japanese tennis player

- Taro Daniel (born 1993), Japanese tennis player (White American parent)
- Anastasia Malhotra (born 1989), Japanese tennis player (Greek-Indian parent)
- Ben McLachlan (born 1992), New Zealand-Japanese tennis player (Kiwi father)
- Brandon Nakashima (born 2001), American tennis player (Vietnamese mother)
- Naomi Osaka (born 1997), Japanese tennis player (Afro-Haitian father)
- Mari Osaka (born 1996), Japanese tennis player and sister of Naomi Osaka (Haitian father)
- Akira Santillan (born 1997) Australian tennis player (Spanish South African parent)
- Erika Sema (born 1988), Japanese tennis player (French parent)
- Yurika Sema (born 1986), Japanese tennis player (French parent)
- Moyuka Uchijima (born 2001), Japanese tennis player (Malaysian mother)
- Maharu Yoshimura (born 1993), Japanese table tennis player (Filipina mother)

=== Track and field ===
- Abdul Hakim Sani Brown (born 1999), Japanese sprinter (Ghanaian parent)
- Asuka "Aska" Cambridge (born 1993), Japanese track and field sprinter (Afro-Jamaican father)
- Bryan Clay (born 1980), American decathlete (African American parent)
- Roderick Genki Dean (born 1991), Japanese javelin thrower (British parent)
- Takeshi Fujiwara (born 1985), Salvadorian athlete (Salvadorian parent)
- Koji Alexander Murofushi (born 1974), Japanese hammer thrower and Olympic medalist and child of Shigenobu Murofushi (Romanian parent)
- Yuka Murofushi (born 1977), Japanese hammer and discus thrower and child of Shigenobu Murofushi (Romanian parent)
- Michael Norman (born 1997), American sprinter (African American father)

=== Others (athletes) ===
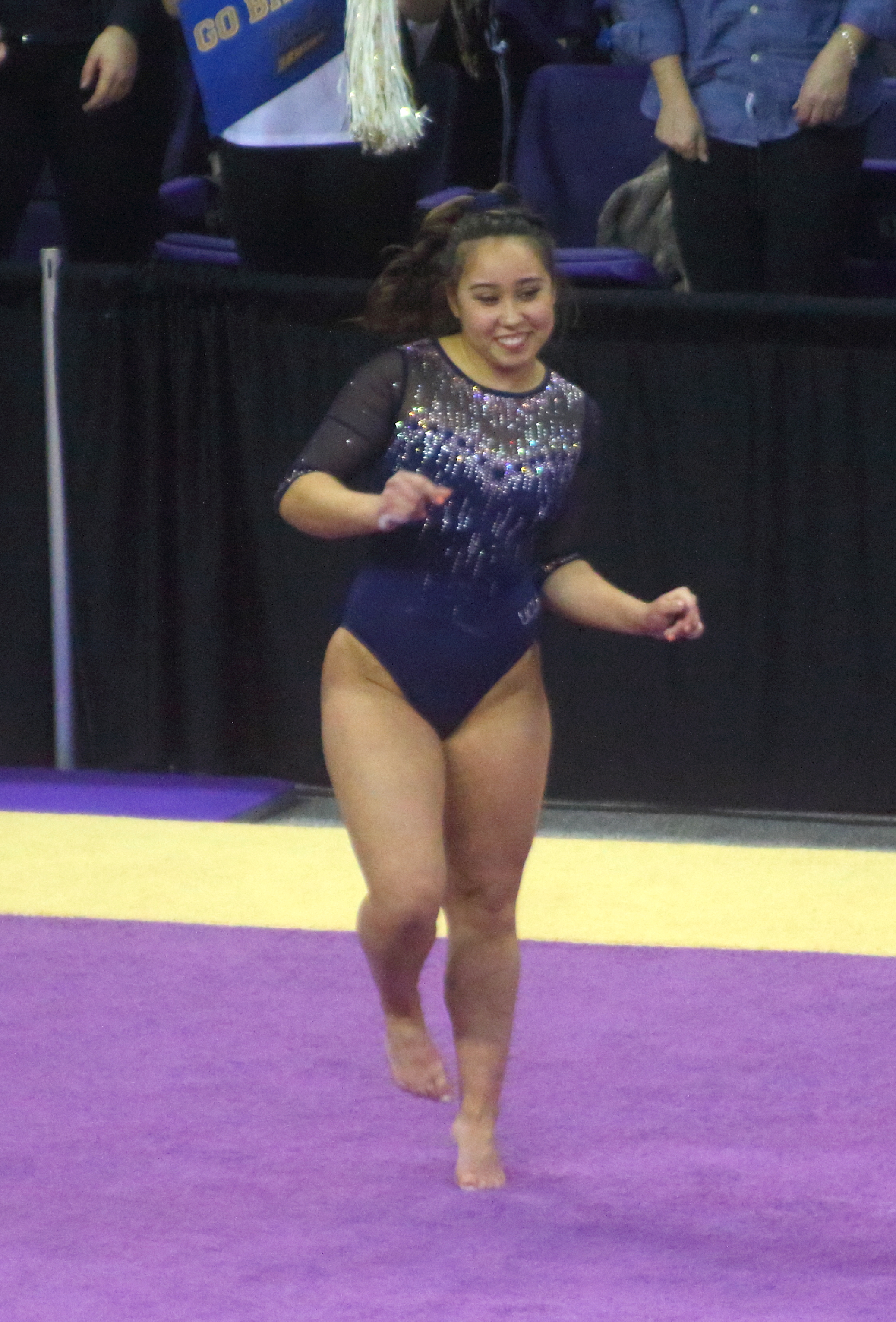
Katelyn Ohashi, American gymnast

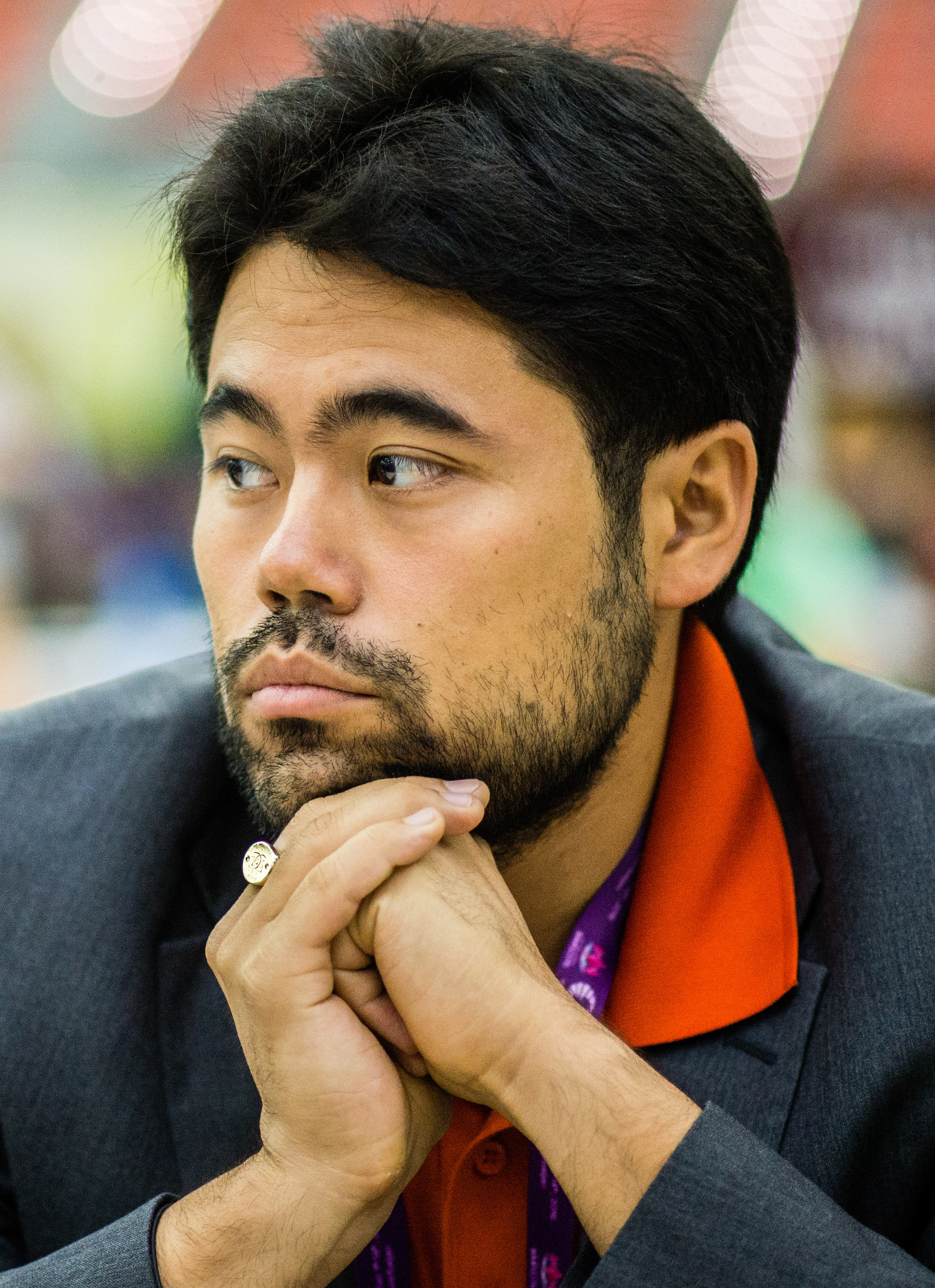
Hikaru Nakamura, American chess grandmaster

- Giuliano Alesi (born 1999), French racing driver and son of Kumiko Goto (French father)
- Marcos Sugiyama Esteves (born 1973), Japanese volleyball player (Afro-Brazilian parent)
- Yui Hamamoto (born 1998), Japanese table tennis player (Chinese mother parent)
- Sakura Hauge (born 1987), Japanese handballer (Norwegian father)
- Lynne Hutchison (born 1994), British rhythmic gymnast (British parent)
- Eddie Jones (born 1960), Australian rugby union coach (Australian father)
- Paul Tetsuhiko Kariya (born 1974), Canadian ice hockey player (Scottish Canadian parent)
- Allam Khodair (born 1981), Brazilian racing driver (Lebanese parent)
- Alicia Kinoshita (born 1967), Japanese Olympic-medalist sailor (Danish parent)
- Kyle Larson (born 1992), American stock car racing driver (White American parent)
- Lee Eun-ju (born 1998), South Korean artistic gymnast (Korean parent)
- Jay Litherland (born 1995), American swimmer (New Zealand father)
- Scott MacKenzie (born 1972), Hong Kong darts player (Scottish father)
- Kotaro Matsushima (born 1993), South African-born Japanese rugby union player (Shona Zimbabwean father)
- Stan McQuay (born 1973), professional bodybuilder (Irish father)
- Leilani Münter (born 1974), American stock car racing driver and environmental activist (Japanese American mother)
- Hikaru Nakamura (born 1987), chess grandmaster (American mother)
- Haruki Nakamura (born 1986), American NFL player (Irish American parent)
- Robbie Nishida (born 1977), American drifter (American father)
- Katelyn Ohashi (born 1997), American artistic gymnast (German American parent)
- Risa Sato (born 1994), Filipina volleyball player (Filipina parent)
- Miki Sudo (born 1985), American competitive eater (European American parent)
- Erica Sullivan (born 2000), American swimmer (American parent)
- Kasumi Takahashi (born 1980), Australian gymnast (Australian parent)
- Jonathan Tisdall (born 1958), American chess grandmaster (Irish parent)
- Rio Waida (born 2000), Japanese-born Indonesian surfer (Indonesian father)
- Peter Westbrook (1952-2024), American fencer (African-American father)

=== Non-athletes ===
- James Holzhauer (born 1984), American sports gambler and game show contestant (German father)
- Don Nomura (born 1957), Japanese sports agent (Jewish American father)
- Eddie Townsend (1914–1988), American boxing trainer (American father)

== Others ==
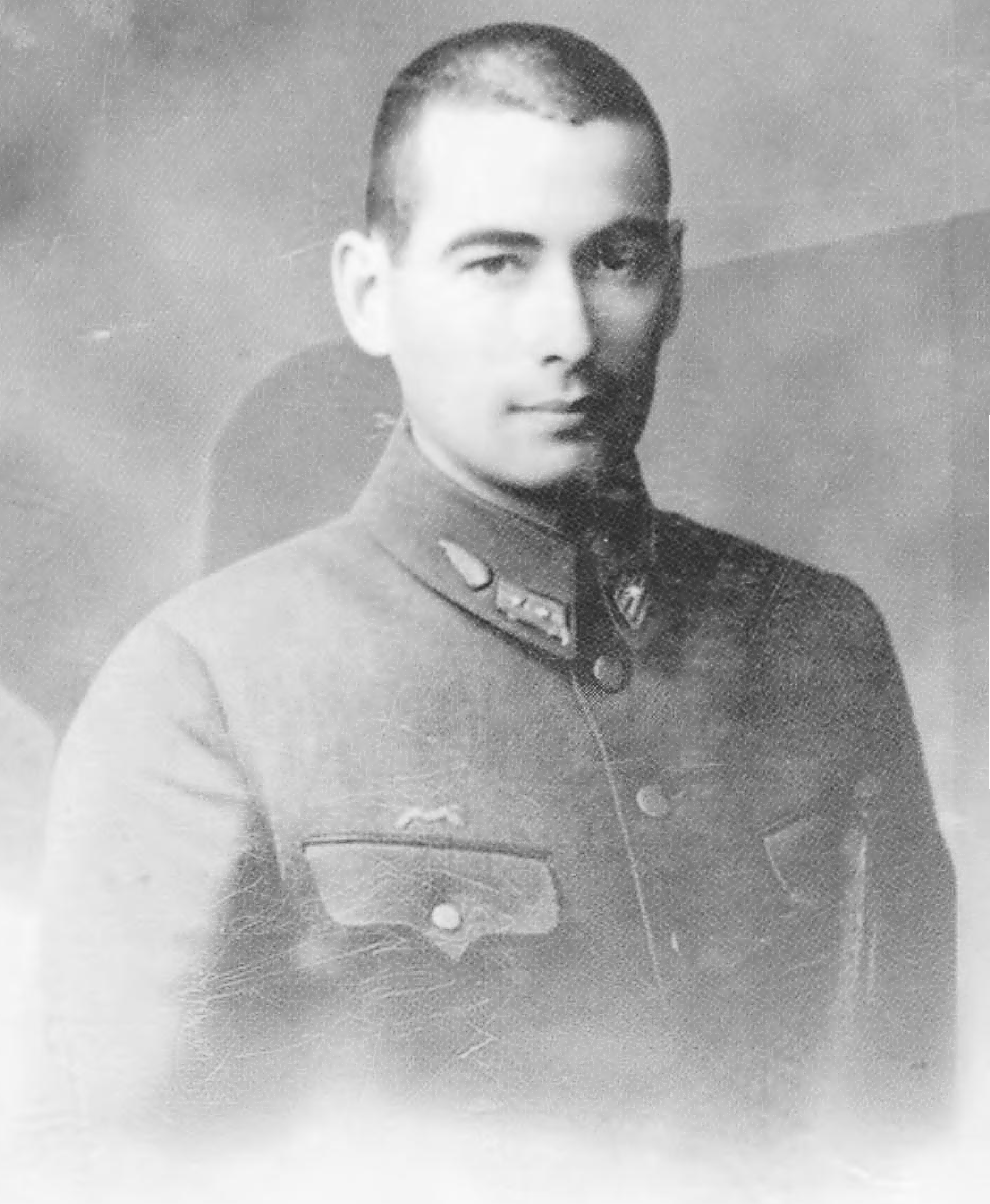
Ryō Kurusu, IJA officer

- Robert John Bardo (born 1970), American convicted murderer of actress Rebecca Schaeffer (American father)
- Antony Dainan (1584–1597), one of the 26 Martyrs of Japan (Chinese father)
- Janey Ensminger (1976 − 1985), victim of government water supply mismanagement and namesake of Janey Ensminger Act (American parent)
- Byron Fija (born 1969), Japanese linguist and practitioner of Okinawan language (American father)
- Jeup Gan-bu, Korean clan progenitor (Korean parent)
- Jeffrey T. Johnson, perpetrator of the 2012 Empire State Building shooting (American father)
- Koxinga (1624−1662), Ming general (Chinese father)
- Ryō Kurusu (1919–1945), Imperial Japanese Army officer (White American mother)
- Lis Lauritzen, Danish cruise ship captain (Danish Maersk Line sailor father)
- Mangjeol Ilrang, Korean clan progenitor (Korean parent)
- Robert King Wittman (born 1955), American FBI agent (American parent)
- Sho Yano (born 1990), American child prodigy (Korean parent)
