= Van Nieuwerburgh =

Van Nieuwerburgh is a surname. Notable people with the surname include:

- Christian van Nieuwerburgh (born 1971), Lebanese executive coach
- Stijn Van Nieuwerburgh (fl. 2003), Belgian economist
