= Saburō Kurusu =

Japanese diplomat (1886–1954)

- 来栖 三郎
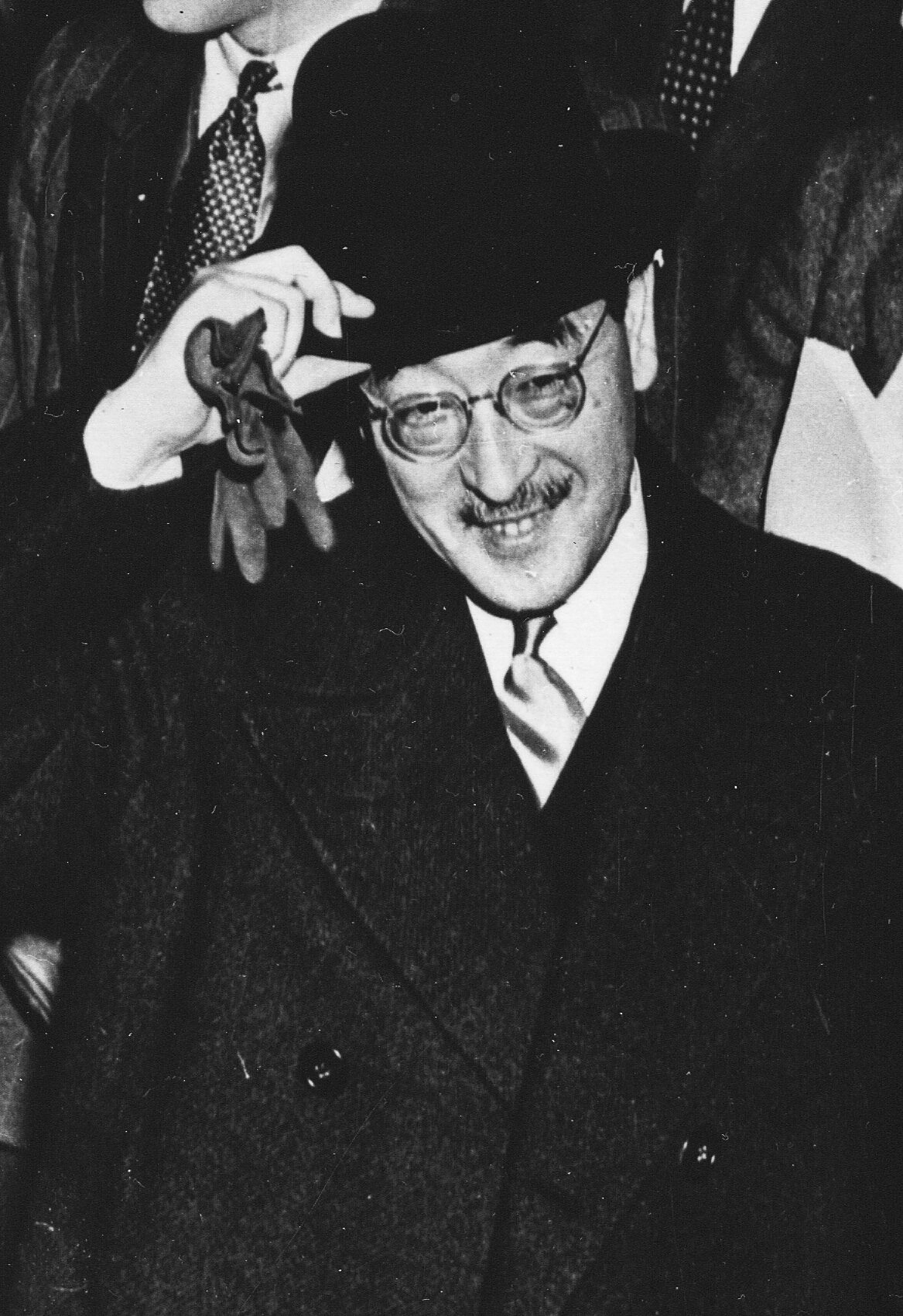
- Kurusu on 27 November 1941
- Born: March 6, 1886; Yokohama, Kanagawa, Japan
- Died: April 7, 1954 (aged 68); Japan
- Occupation: Diplomat
- Spouse: Alice Jay Little (m. 1914)
- Children: Ryō, Jaye, Teruko Pia

Saburō Kurusu (来栖 三郎, Kurusu Saburō; March 6, 1886 – April 7, 1954) was a Japanese diplomat. He is remembered now (in the United States) as an envoy who tried to negotiate peace and understanding with the United States while the Japanese government under Emperor Hirohito was secretly preparing the attack on Pearl Harbor.

As Imperial Japan's ambassador to Germany from December 4th, 1939 to November 1941, he signed the Tripartite Pact along with the foreign ministers of Nazi Germany and Fascist Italy on September 27, 1940.

== Biography ==
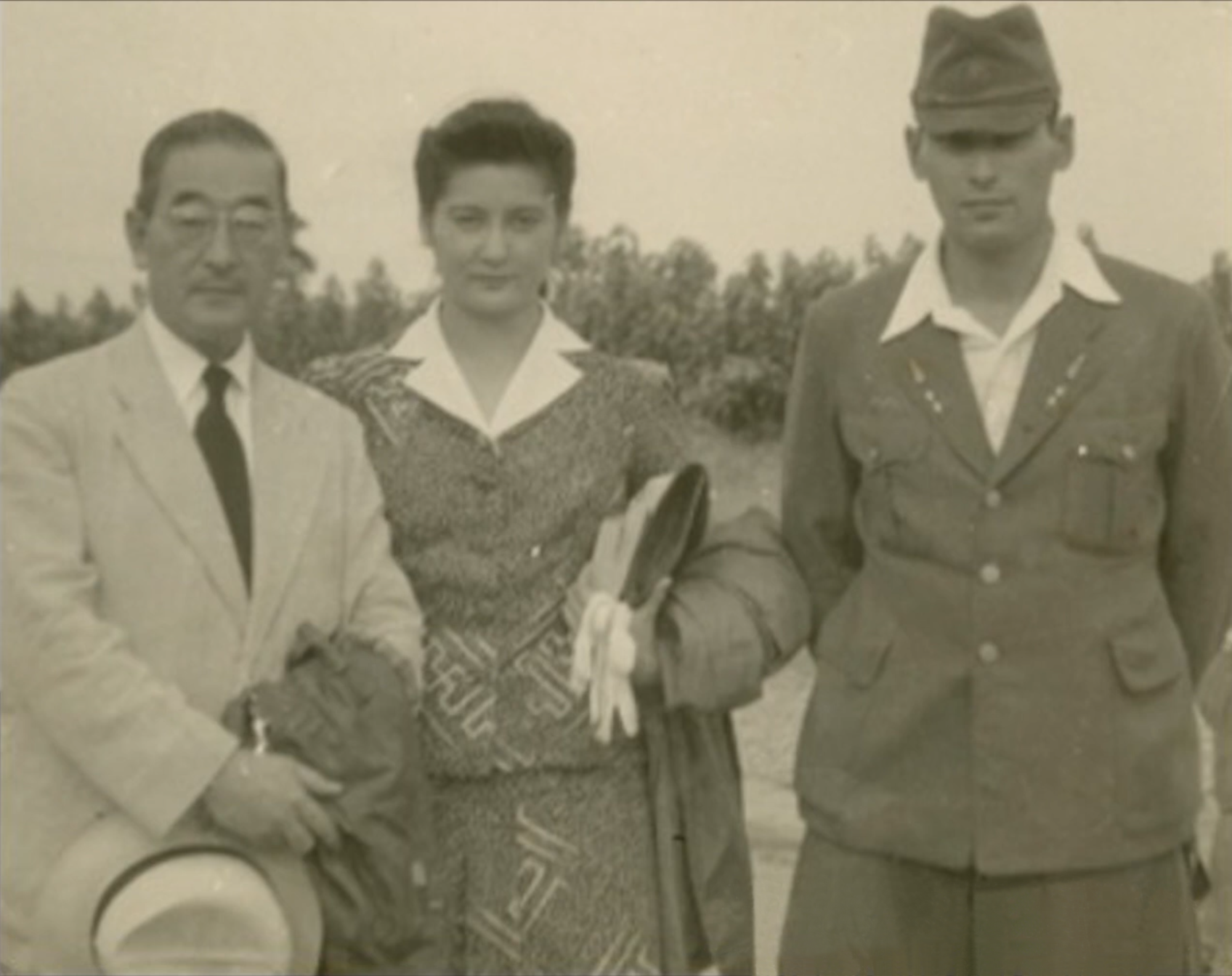
Saburo with his wife Alice and son Ryo (c. 1941)

Kurusu was born in Kanagawa Prefecture in 1886. He graduated from Tokyo Commercial College (now Hitotsubashi University) in 1909. The following year, he entered diplomatic service and, in 1914, first came to the United States as the Japanese Consul in Chicago and was there for six years.

Early foreign service experience included posts in Chile, Italy, Germany, and Peru. As Japanese Consul in Lima, Peru in 1930, he sought to defuse anti-Japanese violence by promoting Japanese immigrant settlements in the rural highlands, rather than in urban Lima. Kurusu was promoted to director of the Foreign Office Commerce Bureau to negotiate trade agreements. In 1937, he was made ambassador to Belgium, and two years later the ambassador to Germany. On September 27, 1940, Kurusu signed the Tripartite Pact in Berlin on behalf of the Japanese Empire, entering into a 10-year military and economic treaty between Germany, Italy, and Japan.

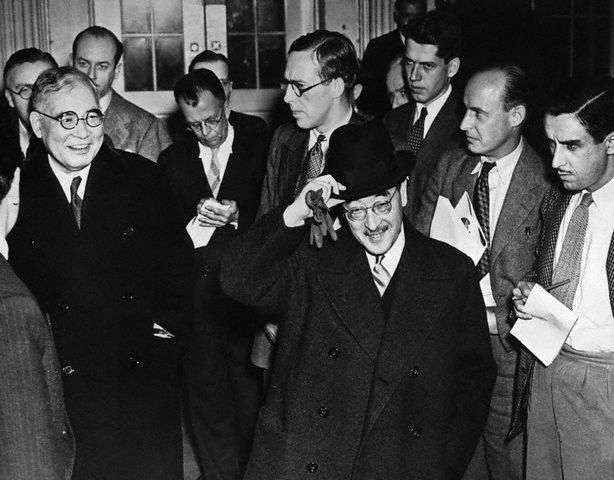
Ambassador Admiral Nomura (left) and Special Envoy Kurusu after meeting President Roosevelt at White House (27 November 1941)

After peace talks between the United States and Japan bogged down in 1941, Kurusu was dispatched as the Imperial government's "special envoy." Arriving in Washington on November 15, Kurusu told newsmen "I am indeed glad to be here in your nation's capital. I extend greetings to all from the bottom of my heart." Two days later, Secretary of State Cordell Hull brought Kurusu to the White House to meet with President Roosevelt. On November 20, Kurusu presented Japan's proposal that the United States cease aid to China and resume trade relations that had been frozen in December 1939. On November 26, Hull conveyed the Hull note, President Roosevelt's demands for Japan to withdraw its troops from China and to sever its Axis ties with Germany and Italy as a condition for peace. Kurusu reviewed the demand and replied, "If this is the attitude of the American government, I don't see how an agreement is possible. Tokyo will throw up its hands at this."

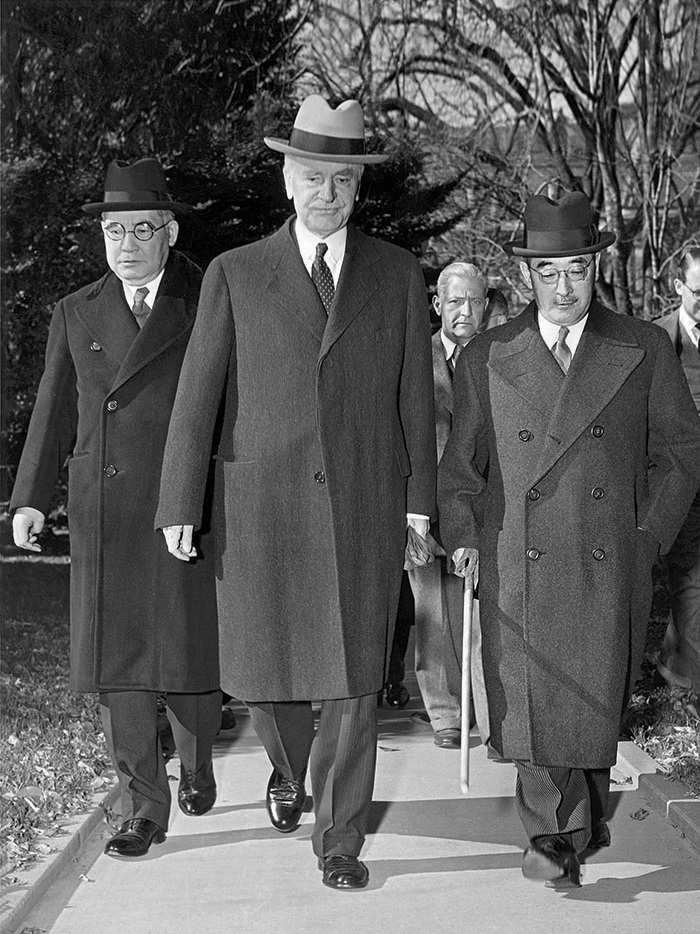
Nomura (left) and Kurusu (right) meet Hull on November 17, 1941, only three weeks before the attack on Pearl Harbor (December 7, 1941)

Over the next three weeks, Kurusu and Ambassador Kichisaburō Nomura continued to confer with Hull while awaiting Japan's reply. On the afternoon of December 7 Kurusu delivered Japan's reply, breaking relations and closing, "The Japanese Government regrets to have to notify hereby the American government that in view of the attitude of the American Government it cannot but consider that it is impossible to reach an agreement through further negotiations."" At that moment, the bombing of Pearl Harbor had commenced. Unaware of what was happening, news reporters questioned Kurusu and Nomura as they left Hull's office. "Is this your last conference?" one asked, and an unsmiling Nomura had no answer. "Will the embassy issue a statement later?" asked another, and Kurusu replied, "I don't know." In addressing Congress the next day, President Roosevelt said, "Indeed, one hour after Japanese squadrons had commenced bombing in Oahu, the Japanese ambassador to the United States and his colleague delivered to the Secretary of State a formal reply to a recent American message."

After the bombing of Pearl Harbor, Kurusu, Nomura and other diplomats were interned in the United States at Hot Springs, Virginia, until the United States and Japan negotiated an exchange of their diplomatic personnel and citizens. In June 1942, the Japanese diplomats sailed to Portuguese Mozambique on board the ocean liner MS Gripsholm, which then brought back American ambassador to Japan Joseph Grew and other Americans who had been interned in Japan. Following the Allied victory in Japan, the American military tribunal elected in February 1946 decided not to prosecute either Kurusu or Nomura. Kurusu was a visiting professor at Tokyo University and lived at a country estate in Karuizawa with his wife, Alice.

Like Nomura, Kurusu maintained for the rest of his life that he had been unaware of the plans for Pearl Harbor. "It must seem absurd to you," he told Frank Robertson of INS, "but it's true. The militarists kept their secret extremely well." He died at the age of 68 in 1954.

== Personal life ==
During his six-year service in Chicago, Kurusu married Alice Jay Little. He had three children, a son Ryō, and a daughter Jaye, who were both born in the United States; another daughter, Teruko Pia, was born in Italy in 1926. Both daughters married Americans and moved back to the United States. In August 1947, Pia married an American ex-US Army recreation officer, Frank W. White, who worked for the War Department in Japan. Neither of Pia's parents attended the wedding in Yokohama. Jaye married William J. Maddox Jr, an American soldier who would later become a major general. The only son, Captain Ryo Kurusu, was killed in a freak accident in 1945. Kurusu did not have any other son although an American newspaper erroneously reported that "his son, Captain Makoto "Norman" Kurusu, was killed in a dogfight over Chiba." After Saburo's death, Alice Kurusu adopted a girl.

== In popular culture ==
Actor Hisao Toake played Kurusu in the 1970 film Tora! Tora! Tora!.

== See also ==
- List of Japanese ministers, envoys and ambassadors to Germany
