= Jennifer Wooden =

Japanese television announcer

- Born: Jennifer Lisa Wooden; September 25, 1995 (age 29); Chuo-ku, Tokyo, Japan
- Education: Keio University
- Occupation: Announcer
- Years active: 2019–present
- Television: Akita Broadcasting System
- Height: 164 cm (5 ft 5 in)
- Call sign: JOTR-DTV

Jennifer Lisa Wooden (ウーデン・ジェニファー・里沙, Uden Jenifa Risa, born September 25, 1995) is a Japanese television announcer for the Akita Broadcasting System in Akita. She was born to a Japanese mother and an Australian father in Tokyo. She earned her academic degree in Economics from Keio University and served as a Chuo-ku Sightseeing ambassador in 2016.

== Honors and award ==
- 2017 Swadesh DeRoy Scholarship Award Pen Award 1st Place
