= 2012 Empire State Building shooting =

Shooting incident in New York, U.S.

- The body of Ercolino after being shot outside the Empire State Building.

- Location of the Empire State Building (Manhattan)
- Location: 40°44′54.36″N 73°59′08.36″W; 34th Street and Fifth Avenue outside the Empire State Building, New York City, United States
- Date: August 24, 2012; 09:03 a.m. (EDT) (UTC-04:00)
- Attack type: Shooting, shootout
- Weapon: Star M1911 .45-caliber handgun
- Deaths: 2 (including the perpetrator)
- Injuries: 9 (all by stray NYPD gunfire)
- Perpetrators: Jeffrey T. Johnson, unnamed NYPD police officers

On August 24, 2012, a gunman shot and killed a former co-worker outside the Empire State Building in New York City. Following the initial shooting, the gunman, 58-year-old Jeffrey T. Johnson, was fatally shot by police officers after raising his weapon at them. Nine bystanders were wounded by stray bullets fired by the officers and ricocheting debris, but none suffered life-threatening injuries.

== Timeline of events ==
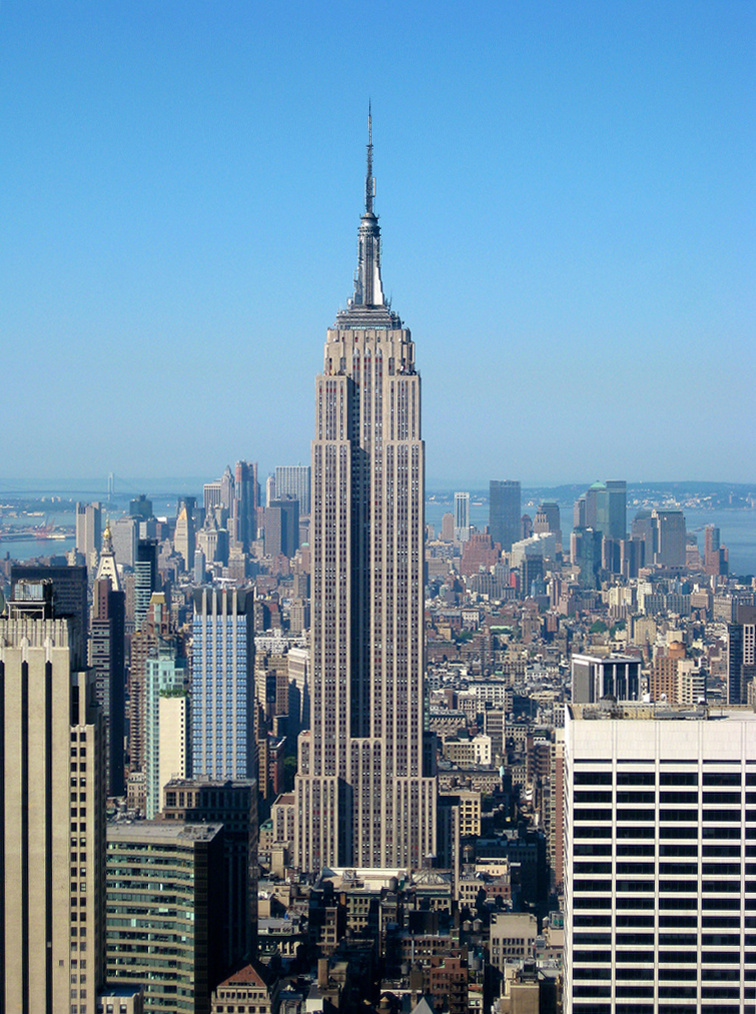
The Empire State Building

On Friday, August 24, 2012, at approximately 9:03 a.m. EDT, at the 33rd Street side of the Empire State Building, Jeffrey Johnson, a clothing designer who had been laid off, emerged from hiding behind a van, pointed a .45-caliber semiautomatic handgun at a former co-worker's head, and fired one round. Once the victim fell to the ground, Johnson stood over him and fired at him four more times, killing him. A coworker of the victim said she witnessed Johnson walk up to him and pull a gun out of his jacket.

After the shooting, Johnson concealed the handgun in a briefcase he was carrying, while pedestrians in the vicinity of the site of the shooting screamed and panicked. A construction worker followed him east on 33rd Street then north on Fifth Avenue and alerted police officers who were stationed in front of the Empire State Building's Fifth Avenue entrance. When confronted by the two officers, Johnson raised his weapon, but didn't fire. The officers fired with a total of 16 rounds, killing Johnson and injuring nine bystanders, none of whom suffered life-threatening wounds. Two officers had discharged their weapons: Craig Matthews; who fired off seven rounds, and Robert Sinishtaj; who fired off nine rounds. Neither had discharged their weapons on patrol before. Three of the bystanders were directly hit by police gunfire, while the rest of the injuries were caused by fragments of ricocheting bullets, or by debris from other objects hit by police. Johnson's handgun, which held eight rounds, still had two rounds remaining when he was shot, and extra ammunition was found inside his briefcase. A witness said people at the scene were shouting, "Get down! Get down!" and that the gunfire lasted about 15 seconds.

The victims, five women and four men ranging in age from 20 to 43, were hospitalized at Bellevue Hospital Center, and NewYork–Presbyterian Hospital/Weill Cornell Medical Center. By Friday evening, six of the nine were treated and released from the hospitals. Eight victims were from New York City, and one woman was visiting from Chapel Hill, North Carolina.

== Perpetrator ==
Jeffrey T. Johnson, a 58-year-old Manhattan resident, was identified as the perpetrator. He was laid off from his job as a women's apparel designer at Hazan Imports at 10 E. 33rd St. about a year prior to the shootings, due to a downsizing of employees. He held his victim responsible for his resultant financial problems and police sources say he recently found out that he was being evicted from his apartment, which may have precipitated the shooting.

Johnson was born in Japan in 1953 to a Japanese mother and American father and moved to the United States when he was 10 months old, where he grew up in Gainesville, Georgia. He had worked at the company for six years and lived alone in a walk-up apartment on Manhattan's Upper East Side at the time of the attack. His building's superintendent and neighbors described him as a quiet and polite man who was seen every morning wearing a suit, greeting his neighbors and getting takeout from a nearby McDonald's, then usually remaining in his apartment for the rest of the day.

He had no known criminal record or history of psychiatric problems and the handgun used in the shooting was legally purchased in Sarasota, Florida in 1991, but he did not have a license to carry a handgun in New York City. He served in the United States Coast Guard from 1973 to 1977 and was honorably discharged with the rank of petty officer second class. Johnson attended the Ringling College of Art and Design in Sarasota, Florida from 1978 to 1980, and owned a T-shirt design company entitled St. Jolly's Art. He was also involved with a community of birdwatching photographers who were interested in hawks in Central Park. His snapshots regularly appeared on blogs tracking the birds in the area.

== Victim ==
Steven Ercolino, a 41-year-old salesman, was identified by police as the slain victim. He lived with his girlfriend in Union City, New Jersey and was a vice president at Hazan Imports. He was a 1992 graduate of the State University of New York at Oneonta. Ercolino's brother, Paul, said that Steven never mentioned having any problems with a co-worker and described him, along with others that knew him, as a gregarious, outgoing family man.

Ercolino and Johnson had filed harassment complaints against each other and Johnson had reportedly threatened to kill Ercolino before. There were disputes between the two due to Ercolino not promoting Johnson's T-shirt line. One incident that was reported to the police happened inside an elevator, when Johnson threw his elbow at Ercolino, who responded by grabbing Johnson's throat and threatening him. In another incident, in April 2011, Johnson reportedly told Ercolino "I'm going to kill you" while on the elevator. Despite Johnson being laid off in 2011, he visited the company on a regular basis afterwards and reportedly had confrontations with Ercolino each time.

== Aftermath ==
At a news conference shortly after the shootings, New York City Mayor Michael Bloomberg and Police Commissioner Ray Kelly said that it appeared that police might have accidentally shot civilians during the incident. The day following the shooting, Kelly confirmed that all of the bystanders had been wounded as a result of police gunfire.

The New York Police Department released a brief surveillance video of the shootout between Johnson and the police. The footage shows Johnson wearing a suit, holding a briefcase, and raising his handgun at the officers, who then responded with gunfire. Johnson is shown being struck by the officers' bullets, dropping his briefcase, and falling to the ground on his back. People sitting on a bench and walking nearby are shown immediately fleeing the scene. A second video was caught by an Australian tourist from street level, where officers are seen with weapons pointed at Johnson lying on his back, just after he was shot. The camera then pans to the nearby streets where bystanders were struck, and to pedestrians trying to hide behind buildings during the ensuing chaos.

In 2017, several victims mentioned the event still affects them to this day, and they have made progress in bringing forth a suit against the NYPD.

== See also ==
- 1997 Empire State Building shooting, a previous shooting that took place inside the building.
