= Ryō Kurusu =

Imperial Japanese Army officer (1919–1945)

- 来栖 良
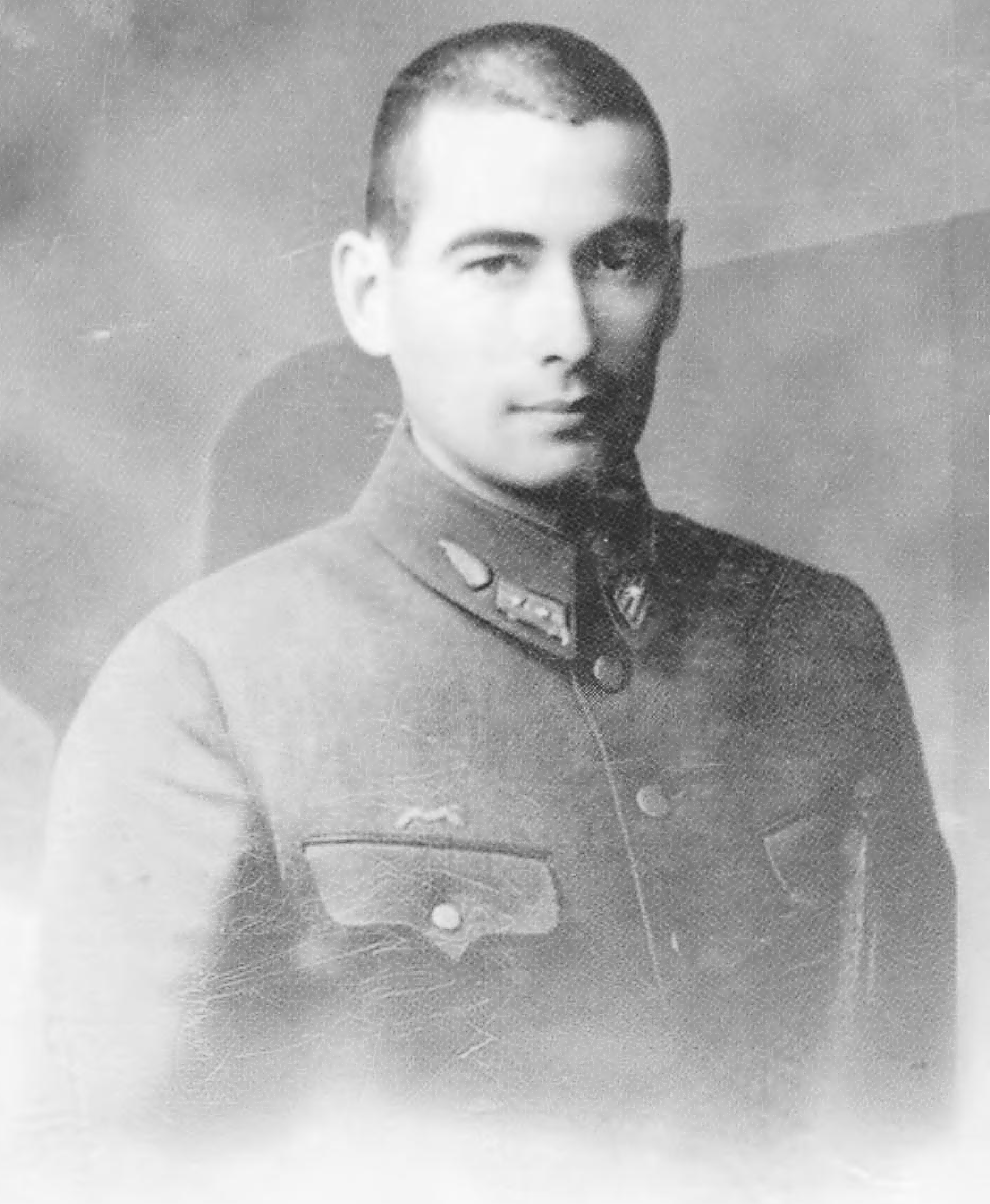
- Kurusu's portrait in the Yūshūkan (at Yasukuni Shrine)
- Born: January 8, 1919; Chicago, United States
- Died: February 17, 1945 (aged 26); Fussa, Tokyo, Japan
- Relatives: Saburō Kurusu (father), Alice Jay Little (mother), Jaye (sister), Teruko Pia (sister)
- Military career
- Allegiance: Empire of Japan
- Branch: Imperial Japanese Army
- Service years: 1941–1945
- Rank: Major

Ryō Kurusu (来栖 良, Kurusu Ryō; January 8, 1919 – February 17, 1945) was an officer in the Imperial Japanese Army. He is noted for being the only Eurasian (American-Japanese Hāfu) person to be commemorated in Japan's Yasukuni Shrine.

== Family ==
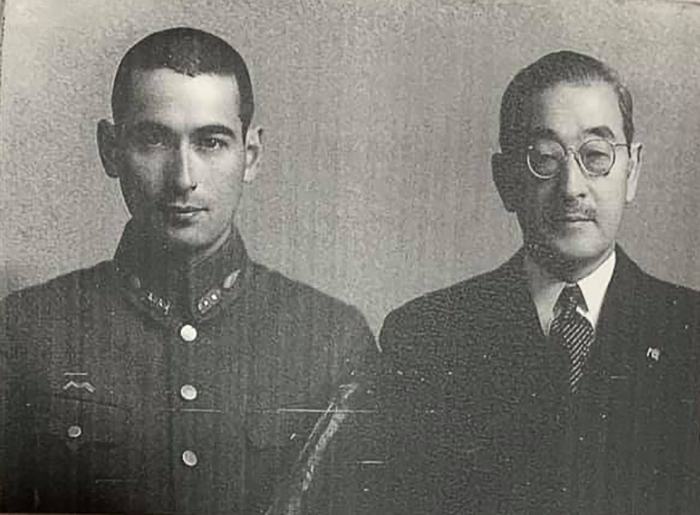
Ryo and his father Saburo (c. 1941)

Kurusu was born on January 8, 1919, in Chicago, Illinois, United States, to Saburō Kurusu (a career diplomat) and Alice Jay Little (an American who adopted Japanese citizenship after their marriage in 1914). His sister Jaye was also born in the United States, while his second sister Teruko Pia was born in Italy in 1926.

In 1927, the family moved to Tokyo, Japan where Saburō continued to serve in high-ranking diplomatic positions. In fall/winter 1941, Saburō was the Special Envoy to the United States, during which time he negotiated for peace and understanding with the United States while allegedly unaware of Japan's secret plan to attack Pearl Harbor.

== Military career ==
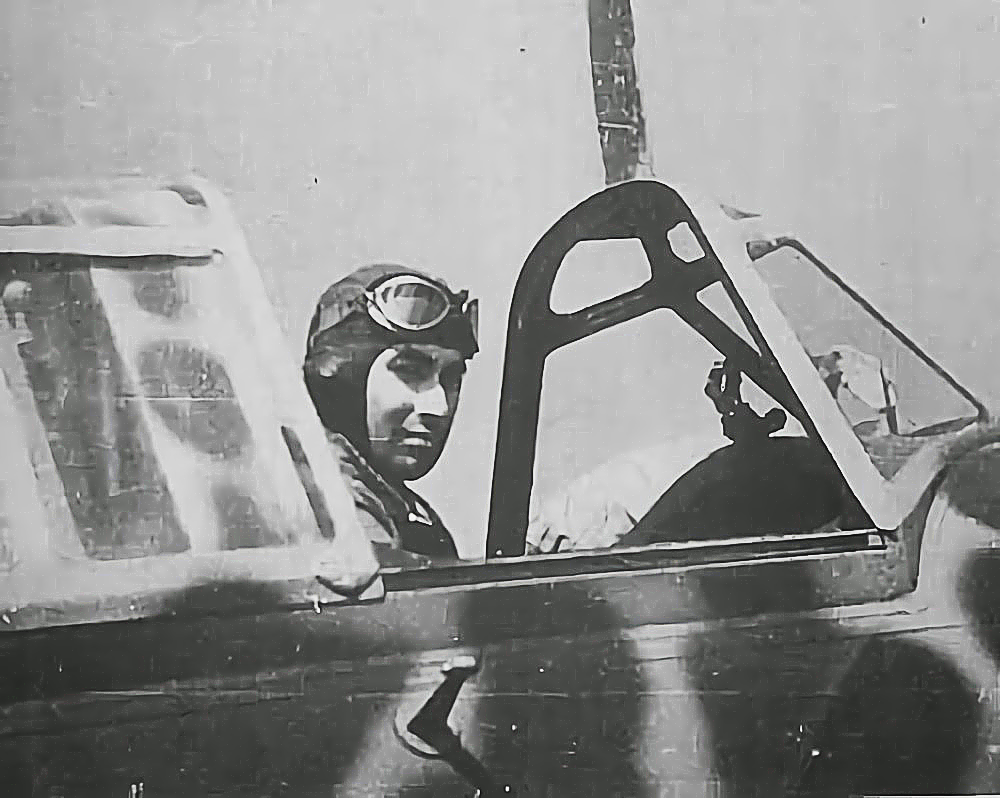
Ryo Kurusu in a Mitsubishi Ki-51

Kurusu studied mechanical engineering at the Yokohama Advanced Industrial College from 1937 to 1940. He also served as the captain of the rugby team. After graduation, he joined the Kawanishi Aircraft Company. Throughout these years, Kurusu reportedly suffered much prejudice and discrimination on account of his predominantly Caucasian appearance.

In January 1941, Kurusu joined the Imperial Japanese Army Air Forces as a pilot trainee and was commissioned as a Second Lieutenant in July. For the next two years, he served as an engineer and test pilot at various military flight schools in the Tokyo area. In 1944, he was transferred to Tama Airfield (now Yokota Air Base) in Fussa, Tokyo. In this posting, he translated captured American flight manuals from English to Japanese.

In February 1945, as the situation grew increasingly dire, Kurusu himself participated in the air defense of Tokyo, intercepting and shooting down one American aircraft in a Nakajima Ki-84 on February 16. On February 17, while running to his aircraft to conduct another interception mission, Kurusu was struck in the head by a taxiing Ki-43 Hayabusa's spinning propeller. He was decapitated and died instantly in what was later determined to be a tragic accident. Because the incident took place during an air raid, Kurusu was officially declared as "killed in action", and is enshrined in Yasukuni Shrine as such. A Japanese novelist later wrote a novel based on Kurusu's stories, leading to the erroneous belief that the real-life Kurusu was speared to death by Japanese civilians who mistook him for an American pilot after he was shot down during an interception mission.

Kurusu's funeral was attended by a number of high-ranking diplomats and military officers. His father chose the following English inscription, by Herodotus, for Ryō's headstone: "In peace, sons bury their fathers. In war, fathers bury their sons." His mother, Alice, was later quoted as saying "I am proud that my son was able to die for his Emperor and his country."
