= Christian van Nieuwerburgh =

British-based executive coach, academic, and author

- Born: 1971 (age 54–55); Beirut, Lebanon
- Occupations: Executive coach, researcher, educational consultant, author

Academic background
- Education: American University of Beirut University of East London University of Birmingham

Academic work
- Discipline: Psychology, English
- Institutions: University of East London
- Main interests: Coaching, coaching in educational settings, motivation, mental toughness, leadership, positive psychology
- Notable works: An Introduction to Coaching Skills: A Practical Guide
- Website: www.icce.uk.com

Christian van Nieuwerburgh (born 1971) is a British-based executive coach, academic, consultant and author. He is a Professor of Coaching and Positive Psychology at the University of East London (UEL) and Executive Director of Growth Coaching International, a Sydney-based global coach training provider for the education sector.

As an author, van Nieuwerburgh is best known for An Introduction to Coaching Skills: A Practical Guide, now in its third edition (2021). He has written or edited a number of key texts in his field: Coaching in Education: Getting Better Results for Students, Educators and Parents (2012), Coaching in Professional Contexts (2014), Coaching Educativo (with Andrea Giraldez Hayes, 2016), Coaching in Islamic Culture: The Principles and Practice of Ershad (with Raja'a Allaho, 2017), The Leader's Guide to Coaching in Schools (with John Campbell, 2018) and Advanced Coaching Practice (with David Love, 2019).

== Biography ==
Christian van Nieuwerburgh was born to a Japanese mother and a Belgian father in Beirut, Lebanon, in 1971, thereafter spending his formative years there.

While living in Beirut, van Nieuwerburgh attended the American Community School and later completed a BA and MA in English literature at the American University of Beirut. At the time of his studies, he worked as an English Literature teacher at both secondary school and university level, took up jobs in journalism and translating and supported the family's Japanese restaurant business. Later on, he moved on to work in the sales and marketing industry.

In 1997, van Nieuwerburgh moved to the United Kingdom with his wife and son to obtain a PhD in English from the University of Birmingham, where his thesis was titled "Representations of Politically Empowered Women on the Elizabethan Stage". While working on his PhD, he worked various jobs, including at Waterstones and the Royal Shakespeare Company. He completed his PhD in 2007.

In 2012, he completed an MSc in psychology at the University of East London.

== Coaching career ==
In 2002, van Nieuwerburgh started working at the Warwickshire County Council as Deputy Head of Service, a position he held for 9 years until 2011. In his role, he provided training and professional development services to West Midlands schools and colleges. He took up the role of executive coach for the West Midlands Councils in September 2008, holding the role until for six years until 2014.

Since 2009, van Nieuwerburgh has spent half of his time working as an academic in coaching psychology. From September 2009 to August 2015, van Nieuwerburgh held the position of Senior Lecturer in Coaching Psychology at the University of East London. He later took up the role of Associate Professor of Coaching at the Centre for Coaching and Behavioural Change within the Henley Business School. He returned to the University of East London Stratford Campus as a Professor of Coaching and Positive Psychology in April 2017.

The other half of his time has been spent developing his own business – he is the Chief Executive of ICCE Ltd. (International Centre for Coaching in Education), which he established to support "the development of coaching initiatives in educational settings globally". He has been holding the roles of Director of Research at Growth Coaching International and managing director of Growth Coaching UK since June 2014. In the past, he worked as a Consultant for AQR International.

=== Beliefs on coaching ===
In his writings, van Nieuwerburgh acknowledges the wide range of definitions of coaching. As a result of his experience and research, he proposes that coaching:

• is a structured conversation that takes place between two people; • aims to support a sustainable change in behaviours or ways of thinking; • focuses on learning and development.

van Nieuwerburgh suggests that successful coaches are able to use a conversational framework, have a set of coaching-related skills (listening to encourage thinking, asking powerful questions, paraphrasing, summarising and noticing) and possess a "coaching way of being". According to van Nieuwerburgh, “coaching is a humanising activity for both coach and coachee. To become a coach is to be respectful of others and embrace the most positive aspects of being human” (p. 184. 3rd edition Introduction to Coaching Skills).

van Nieuwerburgh has been one of the leading figures arguing for closer integration between the fields of coaching and positive psychology, driven by a concern that executive coaching was becoming so focused on supporting people to achieve goals that it could sometimes be detrimental to the wellbeing of coachees. He has argued that the two fields "have a shared focus on unlocking potential, building on people's strengths, enhancing subjective wellbeing and supporting sustainable optimal functioning" (van Nieuwerburgh & Oades, 2017). According to van Nieuwerburgh and his colleagues, "both coaching and positive psychology are fundamentally committed to growth and development. Both argue strongly against deficit-based models of improvement, proposing instead that it is more helpful to identify strengths and build on existing resources" and they hope for the emergence of "integrative, research-informed concepts, techniques and interventions that will support individuals, groups, organisations and societies to grow and develop in subjectively meaningful ways”

During the COVID-19 pandemic, van Nieuwerburgh argued that the theories and research of positive psychology could be deployed to support people through the challenges that they faced. He wrote about hope, optimism and the importance of protecting people's psychological wellbeing during lockdowns.

=== Coaching in education ===
Van Nieuwerburgh has explored the purpose of coaching in education, its transformational effects on educational experiences and how it can be applied in schools and in higher education. Van Nieuwerburgh has suggested that coaching supports the notion that learning should be personalised and encourage both the student and the teacher to develop throughout the learning experience. For students, opportunities for coaching include collaborating with fellow students to improve grades and skills, both academic and social. For teachers and administrators, coaching can help with transitions into new roles. Coaching is also used to support improvement in teaching skills and enhance performance in education institutions.

In 2010-2011, van Nieurwerburgh, together with colleagues from the University of Kent and University of East London, carried out a pilot project at the Sittingbourne Community College, where half of the 1,000 students were deemed to experience barriers to learning for various reasons. Van Nieuwerburgh et al. aimed to raise attainment by delivering coaching training to students over sixteen years old, supported their "interim reflective practice coaching sessions" and assisted in evaluating the project.

In June 2017, van Nieuwerburgh and executive coach John Campbell were scheduled to publish their book titled "The Leader's Guide to Coaching in Schools".

== Personal life ==
Van Nieuwerburgh is married and has one son.

== Bibliography ==
=== Publications (in peer-reviewed journal articles) ===
• van Nieuwerburgh, C., Barr, M., Munro, C., Noon, H. & Arifin, D. (2020). "Experiences of aspiring school principals receiving coaching as part of a leadership development programme". International Journal of Mentoring and Coaching in Education, 9(3), 291–306. • Lucey, C., & van Nieuwerburgh C. (2020). "'More willing to carry on in the face of adversity': How beginner teachers facing challenging circumstances experience positive psychology coaching. An interpretative phenomenological analysis". Coaching: An International Journal of Theory, Research and Practice, Advance Online Publication. https://www.tandfonline.com/doi/full/10.1080/17521882.2020.1753791

• Noon, H. & van Nieuwerburgh, C. (2020). "Looking forward to going back? The experience of career decision-making for first-time mothers and the implications for coaches". International Journal of Evidence Based Coaching and Mentoring, 18(1), 88–102.

• Fouracres, A. J. S., & van Nieuwerburgh, C. (2020). "The lived experience of self-identifying character strengths through coaching: An interpretative phenomenological analysis". International Journal of Evidence Based Coaching and Mentoring, 18(1), 43–56. https://doi.org/10.24384/e0jp-9m61

• Tee, D., Barr, M. & van Nieuwerburgh, C. (2019). "The experiences of educational coaches prior to their first placement: An interpretative phenomenological analysis". International Journal of Evidence Based Coaching & Mentoring 17(2), 52–63.

• Pop, G.V. & van Nieuwerburgh, C. (2019). "Listening to your heart of head? An interpretative phenomenological analysis of how people experienced good career decisions". International Coaching Psychology Review 14(2).

• Passmore, J., van Nieuwerburgh, C. & Barr, M. (2019). Workplace coaching. Oxford Bibliographies in Management. Oxford: Oxford University Press.

• Holden, C., van Nieuwerburgh, C. and Yates, J. (2019). "Um, Err, Ahh Careers Practitioners Perceptions of Weight: A Thematic Analysis". Journal of the National Institute for Career Education and Counselling, 42(1), 33–39.

• van Nieuwerburgh, C. (2019). "On the development of coaching: Where are we now?" Coaching: An International Journal of Theory, Research and Practice, 12(1), 1–2.

• Anthony, D. & van Nieuwerburgh, C. (2018). "A thematic analysis of the experience of educational leaders introducing coaching into schools". International Journal of Mentoring and Coaching in Education, 7(4), 343–356.

• Lech, A., van Nieuwerburgh, C., & Jalloul, S. (2018). "Understanding the experience of PhD students who received coaching: An interpretative phenomenological analysis". Coaching: An International Journal of Theory, Research and Practice, 11(1), 60–73.

• Kodama Killy, A., van Nieuwerburgh, C. & Clough, P. (2017). "Coaching to enhance the mental toughness of people learning kickboxing". International Journal of Evidence Based Coaching and Mentoring, 15(2), 111–123.

• Robson-Kelly, L., & van Nieuwerburgh, C. (2016). "What does coaching have to offer young people at risk of developing mental health problems? A grounded theory study". International Coaching Psychology Review, 11(1), 75-92.

• Pritchard, M. & van Nieuwerburgh, C. (2016). "The perceptual changes in life experience of at-risk adolescent girls following an integrated coaching and positive psychology intervention group programme: An interpretative phenomenological analysis". International Coaching Psychology Review, 11(1), 57–74.

• Barr, M., & van Nieuwerburgh, C. (2015). "Teachers' experiences of an introductory coaching training workshop in Scotland: An interpretative phenomenological analysis". International Coaching Psychology Review, 10(2), 190–204.

• van Nieuwerburgh, C., & Lech, A. (2015). "Understanding the experiences of positive life changes during postgraduate study on a Masters in Applied Positive Psychology Programme: An Interpretative Phenomenological Analysis". International Journal of Wellbeing, 5(3), 72–84.

• Dorrington, L., & van Nieuwerburgh, C. (2015). "The development of peer coaching skills in primary school children: An exploration of how children respond to feedback". International Journal of Information and Education Technology, 5(1), 50–54.

• Gormley, H., & van Nieuwerburgh, C. (2014). "Developing coaching cultures: a review of the literature". Coaching: An International Journal of Theory, Research and Practice, 7(1), 90–101.

• van Nieuwerburgh, C., & Tong, C. (2013). "Exploring the benefits of being a student coach in educational settings: A mixed methods study". Coaching: An International Journal of Theory, Research and Practice, 6(1), 5–24.

• Knight, J., & van Nieuwerburgh, C. (2012). "Instructional coaching: A focus on practice". Coaching: An International Journal of Theory, Research and Practice, 5(2), 100–112.

• Briggs, M., & van Nieuwerburgh, C. (2011). "Coaching cultures: The child's perspective". ICERI 2011 Proceedings, 5076-5083.

• Briggs, M., & van Nieuwerburgh, C. (2011). "Ways of working". Coaching: An International Journal of Theory, Research and Practice, 4(2), 163–167.

• Briggs, M., & van Nieuwerburgh, C. (2010). "The development of peer coaching in primary school children in years 5 and 6". Procedia - Social and Behavioral Sciences, 9, 1415–1422.

• van Nieuwerburgh, C. (2010). "A commentary on 'Holism in sports coaching: Beyond humanistic psychology'". International Journal of Sports Science and Coaching, 5(4), 463–464.

=== Publications (in practitioner-focused journals and magazines) ===
• van Nieuwerburgh, C. (2020). "Six evidenced-based ways to look after your mental health during a second lockdown". 2 November 2020. https://theconversation.com/six-evidenced-based-ways-to-look-after-your-mental-health-during-a-second-lockdown-149256 • van Nieuwerburgh, C. (2020). "Why optimism can be dangerous during a pandemic". The Conversation. 22 October 2020. https://theconversation.com/why-optimism-can-be-dangerous-during-a-pandemic-148073

• van Nieuwerburgh, C. (2020). "'Hope' isn't mere wishful thinking – it's a valuable tool we can put to work in a crisis". The Conversation. 21 September 2020. https://theconversation.com/hope-isnt-mere-wishful-thinking-its-a-valuable-tool-we-can-put-to-work-in-a-crisis-146271

• van Nieuwerburgh, C., & Campbell, J. & Knight, J. (2015). "Lesson in progress". Coaching at Work, 10(3), 35–37.

• van Nieuwerburgh, C., & Campbell, J. (2015). "A global framework for coaching in education". CoachEd: The Teaching Leaders Coaching Journal, 2015(1), 2–5.

• van Nieuwerburgh, C., & Tunariu, A. (2013). "Responding to a new landscape: Towards integrative practice". Coaching Today, 2013(8), 6–10.

• van Nieuwerburgh, C., & Kyritsis, D. (2012). "Time to start Skcoaching". Coaching Today, 2012(3), 15-18. Publications (books)

• van Nieuwerburgh, C. (2020). An introduction to coaching skills: A practical guide. 3rd edn. London: Sage.

• van Nieuwerburgh, C., & Love, D. (2019). Advanced Coaching Practice: Inspiring Change in Others. London: Routledge.

• van Nieuwerburgh, C. & Al-Laho, R. (2018). The Principles and Practice of Coaching in Islamic Culture. London: Routledge.

• Campbell, J., & van Nieuwerburgh, C. (2018). Leadership guide for coaching in schools. Thousand Oaks, CA: Corwin.

• van Nieuwerburgh, C. (2017). An Introduction to coaching skills: A practical guide. 2nd edn. London: Sage.

• Giraldez, A., & van Nieuwerburgh, C. (2016). Coaching Educativo. Madrid: Ediciones Paraninfo.

• van Nieuwerburgh, C. (ed.) (2016). Coaching in professional contexts. London: Sage.

• van Nieuwerburgh, C. (2014). An introduction to coaching skills: A practical guide. London: Sage.

• van Nieuwerburgh, C. (ed.) (2012). Coaching in education: Getting better results for students, educators and parents. London: Karnac.

=== Publications (book chapters) ===
• Munro, C., Barr, M. & van Nieuwerburgh, C. (2020). "Creating coaching cultures in schools". In E. Jackson & A. Berkeley (eds), Sustaining depth and meaning in school leadership. London: Routledge.

• van Nieuwerburgh, C., Knight, J. & Campbell, J. (2019). "Coaching in education". In S. English, J. M. Sabatine & P. Brownell (eds), Professional coaching: Principles and practice. New York: Springer.

• van Nieuwerburgh, C. (2017). "Interculturally-sensitive coaching". In T. Bachkirova, G. Spence & D. Drake (eds), The Sage handbook of coaching. London: Sage.

• van Nieuwerburgh, C., & Barr, M. (2017). "Coaching in education". In T. Bachkirova, G. Spence & D. Drake (eds), The Sage handbook of coaching. London: Sage.

• Law, H. & van Nieuwerburgh, C. (2013). "Coaching and coaching psychology". In R. Bayne & G. Jinks (eds), Applied psychology: Research, training and practice. (2nd ed.). London: Sage.

• van Nieuwerburgh, C. (2012). "Coaching for mental toughness". In P. Clough & D. Strycharczyk (eds), Developing mental toughness: Improving performance, wellbeing and positive behaviour in others. London: Kogan Page.

• Briggs, M., & van Nieuwerburgh, C. (2011). "The use of coaching to support educational leadership in primary and secondary schools in the UK". In I. Kocabas & R. Yirci (eds), Ogretmen ve Yonetici Yetistirmede Mentorluk [Mentoring practices around the world]. Turkey: Ani Yayincilik.

=== Books ===
- Coaching in Education: Getting Better Results for Students, Educators, and Parents (as editor), Karnac Books, May 2012
- An Introduction to Coaching Skills: A Practical Guide (1st ed.), Sage, December 2013
- Coaching in Professional Contexts (as editor), Sage, November 2015
- An Introduction to Coaching Skills: A Practical Guide (2nd ed.), Sage, April 2017
- Advanced Coaching Practice - Inspiring Change in Others, Sage, May 2019.
- The Leader's Guide to Coaching in Schools: Creating Conditions for Effective Learning, Sage, (upcoming)

=== Book chapters ===
- Van Nieuwerburgh, C. (2012). "Coaching and mentoring for educational leadership". In C. van Nieuwerburgh (ed.), Coaching in Education: Getting Better Results for Students, Educators, and Parents', 25–45, Karnac Books.
- Briggs, M., & van Nieuwerburgh, C. (2012). "Coaching in primary or elementary schools". In C. van Nieuwerburgh (ed.), Coaching in Education: Getting Better Results for Students, Educators, and Parents', 47–62, Karnac Books.
- Van Nieuwerburgh, C., & Passmore, J. (2012). "Coaching in secondary or high schools". In C. van Nieuwerburgh (Ed.), Coaching in Education: Getting Better Results for Students, Educators, and Parents, 63–74, Karnac Books.
- Van Nieuwerburgh, C., & Passmore, J. (2012). "Creating coaching cultures for learning". In C. van Nieuwerburgh (Ed.), Coaching in Education: Getting Better Results for Students, Educators, and Parents, 153-172, Karnac Books.
- Van Nieuwerburgh, C., Zacharia, C., Luckham, E., Prebble, G. & Browne, L. (2012). "Coaching students in a secondary school: a case study". In C. van Nieuwerburgh (ed.), Coaching in Education: Getting Better Results for Students, Educators, and Parents, 191–199, Karnac Books.
- Van Nieuwerburgh, C., & Green, S. (2014). "Developing mental toughness in young people: coaching as an applied positive psychology". In D. Strycharczyk & P. Clough (eds.), Developing Mental Toughness in Young People: Approaches to Achievement, Well-Being and Positive Behaviour, 81–97, Karnac Books.
- Van Nieuwerburgh, C. (2015). "The importance of understanding professional contexts". In C. van Nieuwerburgh (ed.), Coaching in Professional Contexts, 1–9, Sage.
- Campbell, J., & van Nieuwerburgh, C. (2015). Coaching in schools. In C. van Nieuwerburgh (ed.), Coaching in Professional Contexts, 131–144, Sage.
- Van Nieuwerburgh, C. (2015). "Towards a coaching culture". In C. van Nieuwerburgh (ed.), Coaching in Professional Contexts, 227–234, Sage.
- Van Nieuwerburgh, C. (2015). "Towards a philosophy of culture?". In C. van Nieuwerburgh (ed.), Coaching in Professional Contexts, 249–257, Sage.
- Van Nieuwerburgh, C. (2016). "Interculturally-sensitive coaching". In Bachkirova, T., Spence, G. & Drake, D. (eds.), The SAGE Handbook of Coaching, 439–452, Sage.
