= Akita Broadcasting System =

Akita Broadcasting System, Incorporated

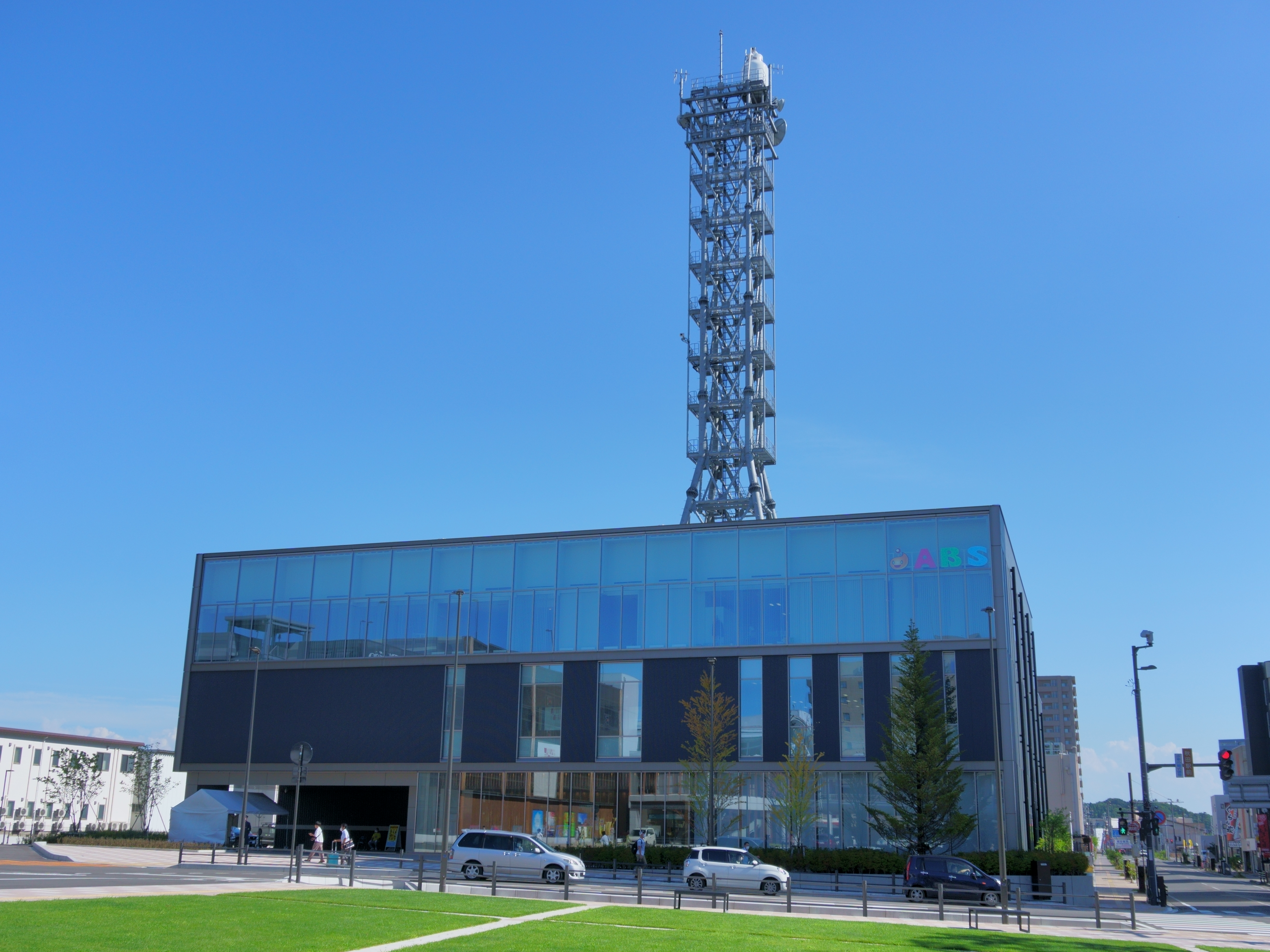
- Trade name: ABS
- Native name: 株式会社秋田放送
- Romanized name: Kabushikigaisha Akitahōsō
- Formerly: Radio Tohoku Co., Ltd. (October 20, 1953 - May 28, 1961)
- Type: Kabushiki gaisha
- Industry: Television and Radio broadcasting
- Founded: October 20, 1953; 73 years ago
- Headquarters: 7-11-2 Nakadori, Akita City, Akita Prefecture, Japan
- Key people: Hidemitsu Yanagishima (Representative Director and President)
- Number of employees: 143
- Website: www.akita-abs.co.jp
- Footnotes; Data from its Corporate Profile

JOTR
- Akita, Akita Prefecture; Japan
- Broadcast area: Akita Prefecture
- Frequencies: 936 kHz (AM); 90.1 MHz (FM)
- Branding: ABS Radio

Programming
- Language: Japanese
- Affiliations: Japan Radio Network; National Radio Network

Ownership
- Owner: Akita Broadcasting System, Incorporated

History
- First air date: November 1, 1953; 73 years ago

Technical information
- Licensing authority: MIC

JOTR-DTV
- Akita Prefecture; Japan
- City: Akita
- Channels: Digital: 35 (UHF); Virtual: 4
- Branding: Akita Broadcasting

Programming
- Language: Japanese
- Affiliations: Nippon News Network and Nippon Television Network System

Ownership
- Owner: Akita Broadcasting System, Incorporated

History
- First air date: April 1, 1960; 66 years ago
- Former call signs: JOTR-TV (1960–2011)
- Former channel numbers: Analog: 11 (VHF; 1960–2011)

Technical information
- Licensing authority: MIC

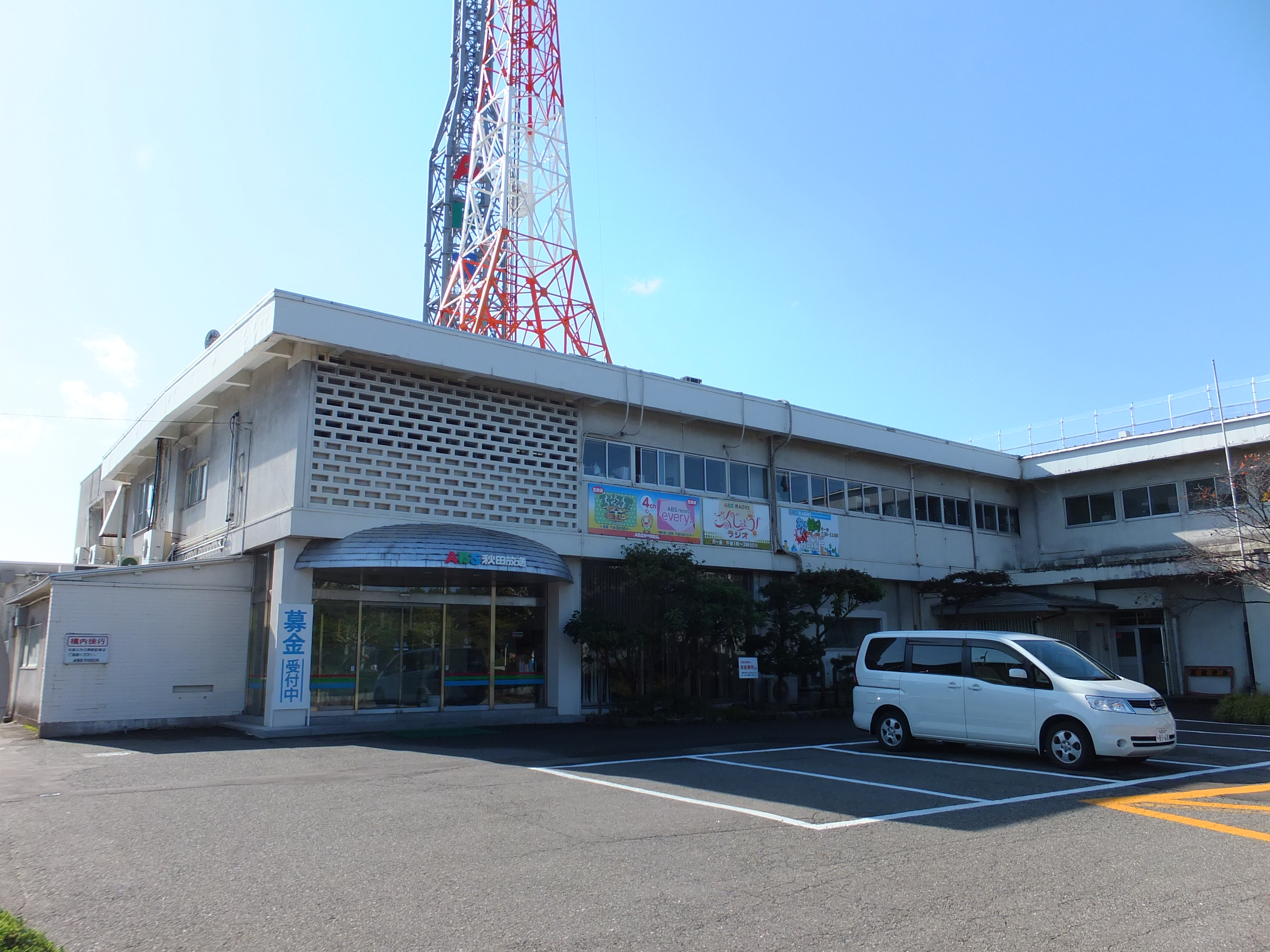
Former headquarters of Akita Broadcasting System

Akita Broadcasting System, Inc. (株式会社秋田放送, Kabushikigaisha Akitahōsō; ABS) is a Japanese broadcaster in Akita Prefecture. Its radio station is affiliated with Japan Radio Network (JRN) and National Radio Network (NRN), and its TV station is affiliated with Nippon News Network (NNN) and Nippon TV Network System (NNS).

In 2021, all broadcasters in Japan will be transitioning their radio services from AM broadcasting to FM broadcasting to alleviate the burden of costs in operating 2 different frequencies. Due to vast, sparsely populated areas, where AM signals propagate properly than FM signals, and also the expenses that will be covered for establishing a brand-new Wide FM transmitter, Akita Broadcasting, and the Sapporo-based stations (Hokkaido Broadcasting & STVradio) will not participate in the transition from AM to FM.
