= General Hershy Bar =

Satirical character

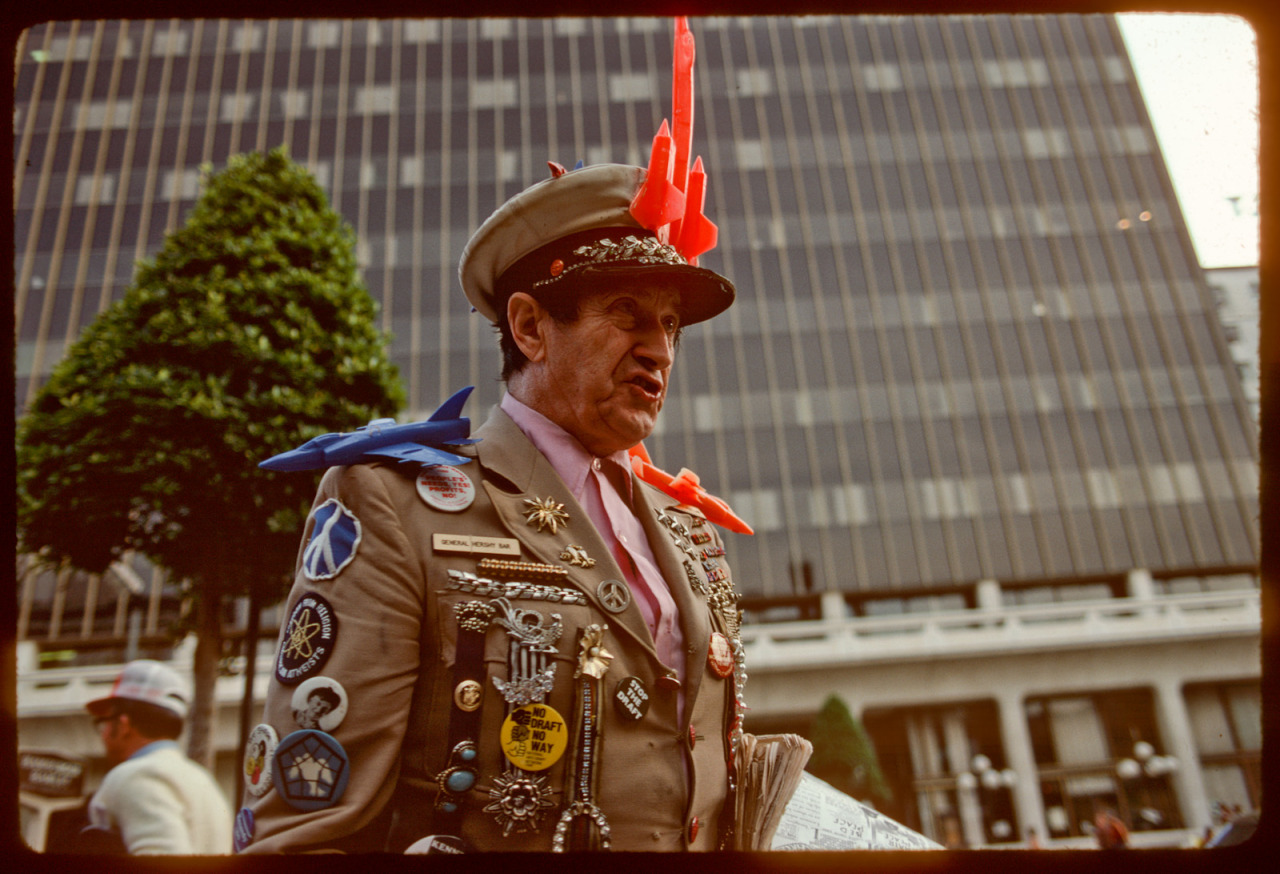
General Hershy Bar on Hollywood Boulevard in front of Grauman's Chinese Theatre 1979-81

General Hershy Bar was a satirical character of the Vietnam War-era Anti-War protest movement, portrayed by William "Bill" Matons, in a parody of U.S. General Lewis B. Hershey, then Director of the Selective Service.

The character's name was also spelled as "Hershey Bar" or "HersheyBar" among Matons' own publications and those of the general public when referring to him. Matons also performed Calypso music under the names The Calypso Kid and Calypso Joe.

== Biography ==
He was born William Arthur Matons in September 1906 and died October 13, 1993 (dates not verified). Bill Matons danced under his birth name in the 1930s in the Modern Dance worlds of New York. During the Calypso Craze of the 1940s, Matons performed as The Calypso Kid on stage and on the radio. He also used Calypso Joe, a stage name created when he was a calypso dancer, promoter, night club owner in the 1940s and '50s. Finally, in the 1960s he adopted the name General Hershy Bar. He kept the name the rest of his life, and most of the time in public he stayed 'in character' as part of his anti-war street-theater.

=== Early life: Wisconsin to New York (1920s to early 1930s) ===
Matons was adopted and raised by Lithuanian parents who encouraged his ad-lib performing talents. He was a modern dancer and choreographer in New York in the 1930s. He was born in Cleveland Ohio, the son of gypsy immigrants. His father settled down to a life making violins in Cleveland, and then moved shortly to Racine, Wisconsin where Matons went to grade school. The family then moved to Milwaukee where he attended a semester of high school before going to work in the steel mills. After this job he was a steeple-jack, coast guardsman, cook on a yacht, and also sold jewelry. He read books on dancing and found notice of Charles Weidman dance scholarships in New York City. After only three months with Weiman's group he appeared in Americana. In his twenties he was dance director of Railroads on Parade at the NY World's Fair and danced in As Thousands Cheer.

=== Modern dance career in New York (1930s) ===
During the Great Depression, the NY modern dance world was influenced by the politics of the left as covered in Ellen Graf's book, Stepping Left Dance and Politics in New York City 1928–1942. Matons appears on the cover of this book in the center.

Matons danced with the Humphrey-Weidman company in New York, from 1933 to 1936 and again in 1940. He appeared in the Charles Weidman works, Ringside, Studies in Conflict, Candide (1933), Traditions (1935), and American Saga (1936) as well as Americana, As Thousands Cheer(1933), and Everywhere I Roam. He was director of the experimental unit of the New Dance League, which evolved from the Workers Dance League between 1931 and 1935.

As Thousands Cheer, by Irving Berlin and Moss Hart, opened September 30, 1933, at the Music Box Theater and closed Sept 8, 1934, with 400 performances by the Charles Weidman dancers Letitia Ide and Jose Limon with Matons and others.

On July 25, 1936, at Bennington, Vermont, the New Dance League presented performances by Anna Sokolow, Matons, Fara Lynn, and Eva Desca. On April 25, 1937, New Dance League presented Dances of Today at St. James Theater. Included at this show were Songs of Protest - Lay Down Late and Sistern and Brethern, Song for Soviet Youth Day, Under the Swastika: Germans Think with Your Blood, Though we be flogged. Matons also appeared in Letter to a Policeman in Kansas City.

In 1938 he danced some early poems of Kenneth Patchen in New York and is mentioned in Patchen's papers at the UCSC special collections archive.

Matons was choreographer for the Lenin Peace Pageant at Madison Square Garden in 1937. Performed with Ailes Gilmour in "Adelante," a Works Progress Administration sponsored Broadway musical in 1939. Adelante, a work with a Spanish theme, opened April 4, 1939, at Daly's Theater and had 16 performances and Matons created the leading role and danced it. The show included Helen Tamiris among others. Tamiris was important in the WPA Federal Dance Project and believed strongly in using dance to explore social themes.

Matons led the Experimental Dance Group in the late 1930s. His dancers included a young Rebecca Lepkoff. He choreographed for the 1939 Worlds Fair in New York, creating the dance for Railroads on Parade – Drama of Transport. The music for this was written by Kurt Weil. Weil had started the score in spring 1938. It was written as a Circus Opera using the elements of theater music from opera to circus. Matons hired Rebecca Lepkoff for the Worlds Fair show and as he could pay a decent wage, uncommon at during the depression, Lepkoff used this money to buy her first camera, starting her photography career.

The author Ramsay Burt described how Matons choreographed and produced One Sixth of the Earth while with Humphrey-Weidman. Burt notes that Matons used the motif of "...poignant speeches by anonymous witnesses in the crowd...derived from the tradition of agit-prop Living Newspapers with origins in the Soviet Union".

In 1939 Matons was still working with Doris Humphrey in the Humphrey-Weidman company.

=== Calypso period (late 1930s to 1950s) ===
In 1938 while with Humphrey and Weidman he began to focus on calypso dance and music. Earlier in his life, while working on a boat, he heard the music while working on a ship stopped in Trinidad (1935), but he had not considered the dance aspect at that time. He found a Spanish music store in Harlem owned by Costellanos Molinas, brought some music home, and made up some dances in 1938. He coached performers from the West Indies in dances and stage techniques to improve their showmanship. He started to import singers to the US and began to have a monopoly on calypso there.

Late 1938 he brought calypso to New York City night life at the Village Vanguard with the Duke of Iron, Gerald Clark and his Calypso Serenaders and a half dozen dancers. The show included satirical acts on important issues of the day. The Calypso Kid stages the revues at the Vanguard with the songs "Edward the VIII" or "Roosevelt in Trinidad" made into small skits with pantomime and dance. Matons and his calypso crew traveled the US and beyond performing shows. Calypso was still a fairly niche market until Joe Miller a radio comic brought the song, "Rum and Coco-Cola" to the US in 1945. A calypso craze swept the nation following this. Many of the songs were banned from radio play at the time due to the earthy nature of many calypso songs.

Matons' importance in the start of the Calypso Craze is noted in the book, "Encuentros sincopados: el caribe contemporáneo a través de sus prácticas musicales -Historia (Siglo Veintiuno Editores) Pensamiento caribeño" by Lara Ivette Lopez de Jesus; "...there never was any organized dance for the calypso; therefore no calypso dance ever existed in reality, only in name...The first person who organized such a dance was an American named Bill Maton [sic], a dancer. He had visited Trinidad in 1935, and appeared in shows in the US and Canada"

In the 1940s and '50s he was performing with calypso singers and operating a night club in NY where he used the name Calypso Kid and then Calypso Joe. A picture of him as Calypso Joe in costume in 1952 is on the Dallas Library Site. A notice in Billboard for April 7, 1945, mentions him coming to Hollywood, "...now that Rum and Coca Cola is hot..." with his revue of calypso stars Lord Beginner, Lord Caresser, Lord Dignity, Chief Eagle Eye, The Duke of Iron and others. He operated a calypso night club in Honolulu in the 1950s. By 1957 he had a calypso night club act appearing in Las Vegas.

Allied Artists Pictures Corporation in Los Angeles came out with Calypso Joe (1957) starring The Duke of Iron and Angie Dickinson among others. Papers noted that it did not include Matons, or compensate him for the use of the name he had spent years building up.

=== Anti-war work (1960s to 1990s) ===
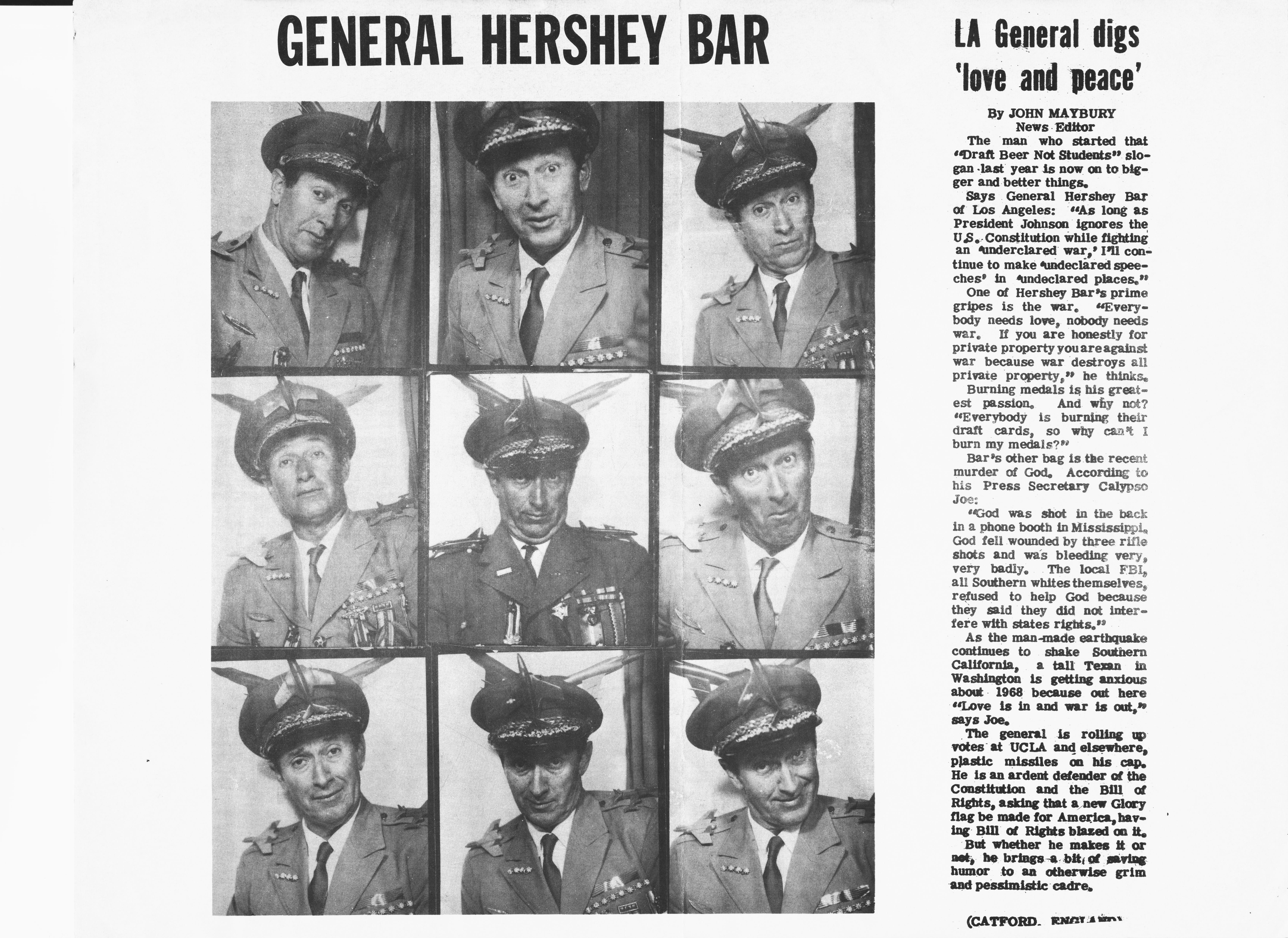
General Hershey Bar brochure 1970

In Los Angeles he self-published several monographs and booklets using the publishing company he created, Handicap Publications. The PeaceNut cartoons were published by Handicap, showing a business location of 5420 Carlton Way, Hollywood, CA. Handicap Pictures was established for producing short films in "true bloody color", as he said. Titles included, President Johnson the Defoliate President, and Damn the constitution-undeclared wars-full speed ahead with the theme song "your lyin’ cheat in’ heart" and he mentions his saying "give war no quarter because it ain’t worth a dime" in one. He published his book, kiss don't kill in 1967 (Handicap Publications). Another publication was "Get off your apathy!: a biography of Florence Beaumont, who burned herself instead of others! —like phony politicians", by Thomas Michael Dunphy (a.k.a. "General Wastemoreland"), Handicap Publications 1968. This work also contains sections written by General Hershy Bar.

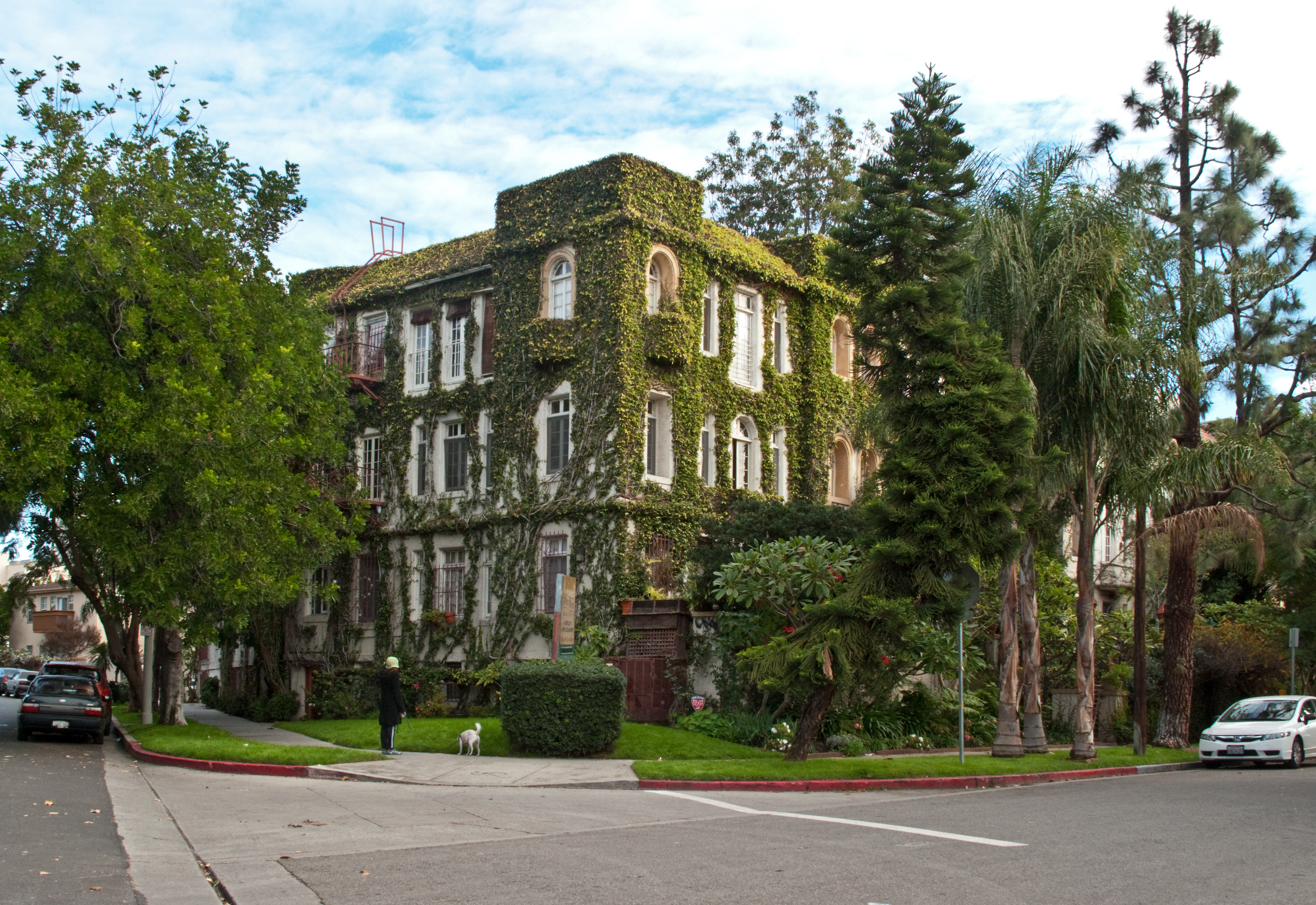
The Afton Arms Apartments, 6141 Afton Place, Los Angeles CA (a.k.a. Malaga Castle)

In 1972 he became the manager of an apartment building in Hollywood (Los Angeles), California. The 42-unit Afton Arms Apartments was built in 1924 at 6141 Afton Place and El Centro by architect Leland Bryant. The building was the site of many important dissident activities, The Hollywood Ten and Art Kunkin's Los Angeles Free Press both used the Grand Ball room. In 1987, Hillel Slovak of the Red Hot Chili Peppers was found dead in his apartment in the building where he lived. The General renamed the building "The Happy Malaga Castle" in 1972

In 1978 he was one of the participants at the first Doo Dah Parade, an irreverent alternative to the traditional formality of the Rose Parade in Pasadena. Through the late 1970s to early 1980s he lived on Harvard Blvd in Hollywood, CA. In Hollywood he would 'perform' his anti-war guerrilla street theater for tourists to Grauman's Chinese Theater and other Hollywood Boulevard locations, including while on the RTD bus he got around on. He died October 13, 1993. He was frequently seen partnered with General Waste More Land (a.k.a. Tom Dunphy), a parody of General William Westmoreland. The characters were common at street theater performances and demonstrations against U.S. military involvement in Vietnam. Tom Dunphy (a.k.a. "General Waste More Land") still lives in Berkeley Ca (see video below). He would greet people on the street he met as "General" and salute often as well, which was saying that we are all Generals and so complicit in war.

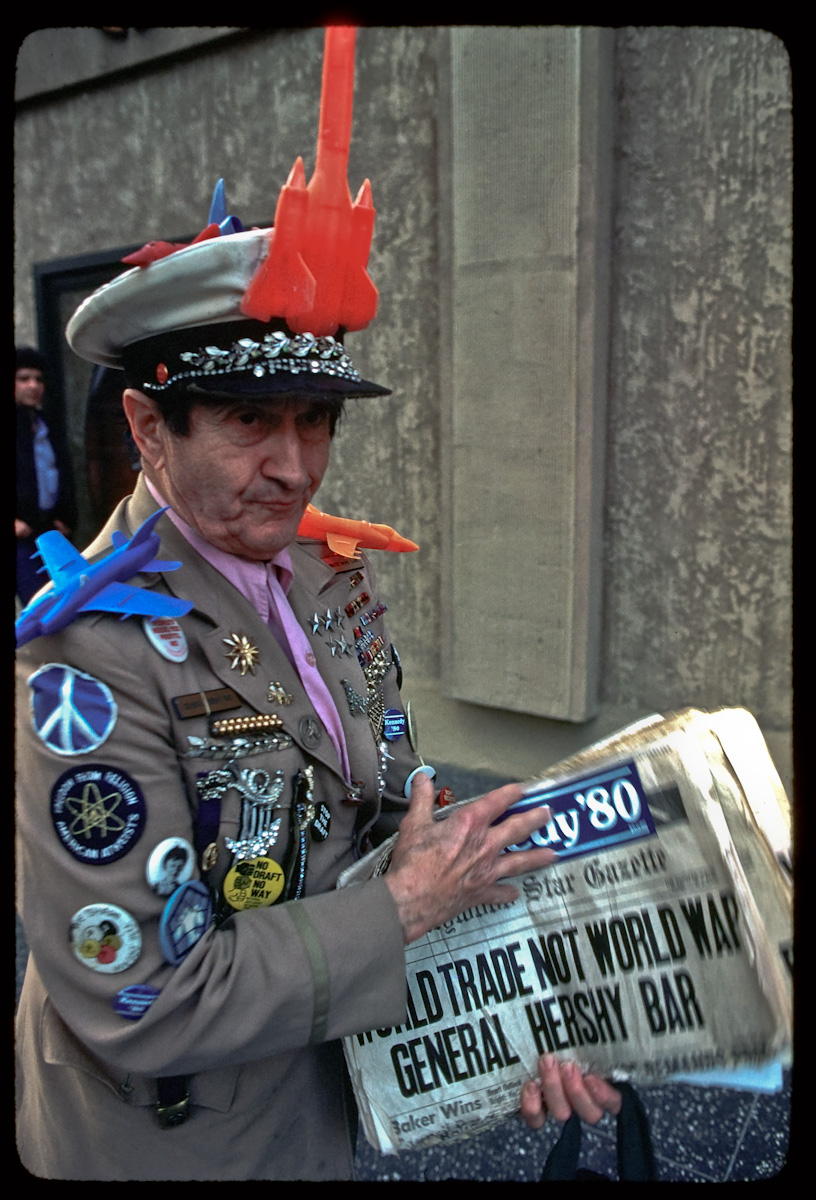
General Hershy Bar on Hollywood Boulevard, Hollywood CA 1979-81

== Appearances ==
- He appeared in many dance performances in the 1930s until the 1950s. Starting out in Modern Dance in New York and ending with Calypso Dancing in venues across the Western Hemisphere.
- He appeared in the Charles Weidman works, Ringside, Studies in Conflict, Candide (1933), Traditions (1935), and American Saga (1936) as well as Americana, As Thousands Cheer, and Everywhere I Roam.
- He appears in a 6 1/2-minute B&W 16mm film, Humphrey-Weidman Company (1938), by Ann Barzel filmed during a performance at the Auditorium Theater Chicago. The featured the dancers, Doris Humphrey, Charles Weidman, José Limón, Bill Matons, Katherine Litz, Katherine Manning, and Sybil Shearer. The film has short excerpts from 7 works. Matons appears in Traditions with choreography by Charles Weidman. Danced by Charles Weidman, José Limón, and Bill Matons.
- He appears on the cover of Ellen Graf's book, 'Stepping Left Dance and Politics in New York City 1928-1942'.
- In 1969 General Hershey Bar supposedly showed up at the Altamont free concert in California where performers included the Rolling Stones. The movie made of the concert shows Bar's work partner General Wastemoreland in full regalia, making a gesture he satirically called a navel salute, which involved placing a horizontal hand on his navel then moving his arm out horizontally. There was a case brought by General Hershy Bar regarding the use of his image in the Altamont concert movie by the Rolling Stones. In that case he says it was not him, but General Wastemoreland that appears in the movie. Details of this case are at the link below.
- He also made a cameo appearance in a low-budget movie made for public access, entitled Broadcast From The Future, in which he appeared as Doctor Everest Word. (Bluemonkey Films by Martin Cohen, also starring Evonne Pizzoni, aired in 1991).
- The characters of General Hershy Bar and General Waste More Land were made into a 1967 underground comic book called Those Lovable Peace-Nuts by William Stout.
- Photographer Richard Friedman wrote of encountering General Hershy Bar at a so-called War Is Over march in the late 1960s:

The rally started in Washington Square and went up Fifth Avenue.... At the rally I found Phil Ochs, Paul Krassner and Abbie Hoffman. Also General Hersheybar.

- He appeared in uniform on the street in a 1986 music documentary, "X - The Unheard Music" by the LA punk band, X during the song "Los Angeles".
- He appeared in the 1967 movie, Something's Happening, chronicling the youth movement on the Sunset Strip in LA and in San Francisco's Haight Ashbury.

== Lists ==
List of choreographers

List of peace activists

List of dance personalities
