= Léonie Gilmour =

American educator, editor, and journalist

- Léonie Gilmour
- Born: June 17, 1873; New York City, U.S.
- Died: December 31, 1933 (aged 60); New York City, U.S.
- Occupations: Educator, editor, journalist
- Partner: Yone Noguchi
- Children: Isamu Noguchi, Ailes Gilmour

Léonie Gilmour (June 17, 1873 – December 31, 1933) was an American educator, editor and journalist. She was the lover and editor of the writer Yone Noguchi and the mother of sculptor Isamu Noguchi and dancer Ailes Gilmour. She is the subject of the feature film Leonie (2010) and the book Leonie Gilmour: When East Weds West (2013).

== Life ==
Léonie Gilmour was born in New York City on June 17, 1873, and grew up in the East Village, Manhattan. At the time of her birth, her father, Andrew Gilmour, a clerk, and mother, Albiana Gilmour (née Smith, daughter of one of the co-founders of the Brooklyn Times-Union), were living "in one room in a rear house" in St. Brigid's Place, the alley behind St. Brigid's Church on the east side of Tompkins Square Park. Léonie was among the first students at the Free Kindergarten organized by Felix Adler's Ethical Culture Society and became a member of the first class of the Workingman's School (later Ethical Culture School). After her graduation in 1887, Adler found a place for her at the recently opened Bryn Mawr School near Philadelphia. As one of the few students to pass the Bryn Mawr School's rigorous graduation requirements, she was awarded its first four-year college scholarship, funded by school president Mary Garrett.

As was expected, Gilmour enrolled at Bryn Mawr College in the fall of 1891. Despite an early interest in chemistry, she eventually chose to major in history and political science as her major fields. In her third year, following the example of many students preparing for the school's rigorous foreign language exams (which required students to translate on sight from Greek, Latin, French and German), Léonie decided to spend a year abroad studying at the Sorbonne in Paris. Upon her return in the fall of 1894, she was assigned to the same residence hall dining table as incoming student Catharine Bunnell (niece of future Yale benefactor John William Sterling), and the two became lifelong friends. In January 1895, an illness leading to hospitalization led to Gilmour's withdrawal from the college, her transcript citing "reasons of health," although Gilmour's biographer speculates that the expiration of her four-year scholarship the previous year may have been a contributing factor. She never completed her degree. Her friend Catharine Bunnell also withdrew from the college at the end of the year.

After leaving Bryn Mawr College in 1896, Gilmour taught at the Academy of St. Aloysius in New Jersey and worked at various editing jobs. In 1901, she answered a classified advertisement placed by Yone Noguchi, a 25-year-old Japanese writer who had recently arrived in New York. Noguchi had spent seven years in California and had published two books of English poetry, but his mastery of English was insecure. Gilmour agreed to become his editor. The relationship proved successful, and with Gilmour's assistance, Noguchi resumed work on a fictional diary of a Japanese girl published in 1902 as The American Diary of a Japanese Girl.

Following Noguchi's return from England in 1903, the relationship took an amorous turn, and on November 18, Noguchi wrote out a declaration of questionable legality stating that "Leonie Gilmour is my Lawful wife." The marriage remained secret and the two continued to maintain separate residences. When the arrangement proved less than successful, it appeared that the experiment would simply be brought to an end in the early months of 1904 with no one being the wiser. Noguchi resumed his relationship with Washington, D.C. journalist Ethel Armes and with the onset of the Russo-Japanese War, began making plans to return to Japan in the fall.

Trouble developed, however, when Gilmour discovered she had become pregnant during the waning days of the relationship. Rather than pressing Noguchi for a reconciliation, she chose to join her mother in Los Angeles, and gave birth to Isamu Noguchi on November 18, 1904.

The birth was publicized when a Los Angeles Herald reporter visited Léonie in the hospital. After Ethel Armes confirmed the truth of the story and canceled her engagement to Noguchi, Noguchi began attempting to persuade Gilmour to come to Japan. Léonie resisted for some months before finally agreeing. By the time she arrived in March 1907 Noguchi had become involved with a Japanese woman, Matsuko Takeda.

In Tokyo, Gilmour worked primarily as a teacher and resumed her helpful role as Noguchi's editorial assistant. Unable to use her alma mater connection with Tsuda Umeko to secure a position at Tsuda College as she hoped, Léonie worked at a Yokohama school and privately tutored the children of the late Lafcadio Hearn, among others.

Domestic arrangements proved strained even before Léonie belatedly learned of the existence of Takeda Matsuko, around the time of Matsuko's second pregnancy by Noguchi. Léonie separated from Noguchi in 1909, taking Isamu, and living in a series of residences in Ōmori, Yokohama and Chigasaki. In 1912 as a result of a relationship with a man whose identity remains mysterious (Isamu Noguchi biographer Masayo Duus speculates that he was one of Léonie's students) she gave birth to a daughter, Ailes Gilmour.

Gilmour sent Isamu back to the United States to attend an experimental school in 1918. She and Ailes continued to reside in Japan until 1920 when they returned to the United States, settling in San Francisco, and later moving to New York, where she successfully dissuaded Isamu from his plan to attend medical school and redirected him to the artist's vocation she had chosen for him when he was still an infant. Ailes was sent to a progressive school in Connecticut.

Gilmour herself made ends meet through a small import/export business and various other jobs. In December 1933 she was admitted to New York's Bellevue Hospital with pneumonia and died on New Year's Eve of coronary thrombosis with arteriosclerosis as a contributory factor.

=== Literary works ===
Although Gilmour harbored literary aspirations, her achievements as a writer were limited. Much of her literary energy was channeled into her editorial projects, particularly those of her partner, Yone Noguchi. It has been speculated that she may have co-authored or authored some works attributed to him, such as The American Diary of a Japanese Girl, and there is little doubt that much of Noguchi's best writing was accomplished with her editorial assistance.

As an author in her own right, Gilmour's most successful pieces were short autobiographical essays for newspapers and magazines chronicling unfortunate events with a wry ironic humor, In a picaresque, matter-of-fact style, Gilmour described the unusual situations in which she found herself as a result of her unconventional attitudes and lifestyle. Gilmour's "Founding a Tent-Home in California," for example, shows turn-of-the-century Los Angeles from the perspective of a hapless, idealistic new arrival. "Dorobo, or the Japanese Burglar" portrays the experience of being burglarized with a humorous perspective.

Near the end of her life, at the request of her son, Gilmour had begun writing a memoir which she referred to as "the book." This evidently included the brief account of her childhood entitled "St. Bridget's Child," as well as "The Kid Chronicle that Was Not Written" (describing her meeting and correspondence with Charles Warren Stoddard) and "Inside Looking On: When East Weds West." All of these were unpublished at the time of her death, as was her story about Ailes' arrival in San Francisco, "Ai-chan Goes to Frisco."

=== Interest in Gilmour ===
Gilmour's unconventional life and perspectives have made her the subject of interest among scholars and a Japanese filmmaker. In 2009, Japanese filmmaker Matsui Hisako (松井久子) began production of Leonie, a film based on Gilmour's life. Actress Emily Mortimer played the role of Gilmour in the film. A book, Leonie Gilmour: When East Weds West, including a biography of Gilmour by Edward Marx, along with Gilmour's collected writings, was published in 2013.
