= Ailes Gilmour =

Japanese American dancer (1912–1993)

- Born: January 27, 1912; Yokohama, Japan
- Died: April 16, 1993 (aged 81); Santa Fe, New Mexico, US
- Known for: Dance
- Movement: Modern Dance

Ailes Gilmour (January 27, 1912 – April 16, 1993) was a Japanese American dancer who was one of the young pioneers of the American Modern Dance movement of the 1930s. She was one of the first members of Martha Graham's dance company. Gilmour's older half-brother was sculptor Isamu Noguchi.

== Early life ==
Gilmour was born in 1912 in Yokohama, Japan. Her father was unknown. Her mother, Léonie Gilmour, attended Bryn Mawr College and studied at the Sorbonne in Paris, then moved to New York City in the early 1900s to try to establish herself as a writer. In 1907, Léonie traveled to Japan at the behest of Yone Noguchi, the father of Ailes' older half-brother, Isamu, who had been born in 1904. However, by the time Léonie arrived in Tokyo, Yone was involved with a Japanese woman who had already borne the first of their nine children. Léonie's circumstances in Japan were always precarious. Nevertheless, she chose to stay there, teaching to support herself and Isamu, while continuing to edit Yone's writing. When Ailes was born, Léonie chose the name Ailes for her daughter from a poem Beauty's a Flower by Moira O'Neill, the pseudonym of Agnes Shakespeare Higginson. It is a striking coincidence that the words in that poem seemed to predict Ailes' career as a dancer. O'Neill wrote, "Ailes was a girl that stepped on two bare feet..." Léonie, Isamu and Ailes lived together in Japan until 1918, when Léonie sent Isamu back to the United States to attend a progressive school in Indiana.

Young Ailes grew up in a Japanese style house that Léonie had constructed in Chigasaki, a seaside town near Yokohama. Ailes had close Japanese childhood friends, spoke Japanese as well as English and identified with Japan before she returned to the United States in 1920, at age 8. When Ailes and her mother returned to America, they lived first in San Francisco and then moved to New York City. Léonie was a great believer in progressive education and sent Ailes to the Ethical Culture Society elementary school, founded in 1876 by Felix Adler. Léonie herself had attended the predecessor to the Ethical Culture Society elementary school when it was called the Workingman's School. For high school, Léonie chose the Cherry Lawn School in Connecticut for her daughter. It was a boarding school that was known for its progressive, coeducational program. The director and founder of the school was Dr. Fred Goldfrank, who was related to one of the founders of the Ethical Culture Society. Ailes greatly enjoyed her time there and formed several friendships that she maintained for the rest of her life.

In 1928, Gilmour was the literary editor of The Cherry Pit, the Cherry Lawn's student magazine. After she graduated from high school in 1929, she went on to the Neighborhood Playhouse to study dance and performing arts as a scholarship student. There she met the young Martha Graham and joined her new professional dance troupe. Gilmour told Marion Horosko that she introduced Graham to her half-brother, Noguchi, in 1929. Graham had a bust made of herself in bronze.

== Career ==
During the Depression Era, dancers like Gilmour and artists like Noguchi struggled to find work. In 1932, when Radio City Music Hall opened, Gilmour performed at the debut with Graham's company. Their work, Choric Patterns, lasted on stage for just one week. Gilmour ruefully observed to Marion Horosko that Radio City Music Hall could succeed only when it became a movie theater with Rockettes.

In the 1930s, Gilmour appeared on dance programs with dancer-choreographer Bill Matons. Matons was the director of the "experimental unit" of the New Dance League, which evolved from the Workers Dance League between 1931 and 1935. Bill Matons was to later become General Hershy Bar, an anti-war street theater character and publisher. Among the group's later-to-become-famous members were male dancer-choreographers like José Limón and Charles Weidman. In 1937, Ailes and Matons performed in a Works Progress Administration (WPA) recital at the Brooklyn Museum. In 1939, they were in Adelante, a WPA-sponsored Broadway musical. Also in 1937, Matons did the choreography for the Lenin Peace pageant at Madison Square Garden.

In 1948, Gilmour married anthropologist Herbert J. Spinden. They had a son, Joseph.

On April 16, 1993, Gilmour died in Santa Fe, New Mexico at the age of eighty-one.
