= Doo Dah Parade =

Humorous parade in Pasadena, California

Pasadena Doo Dah Parade
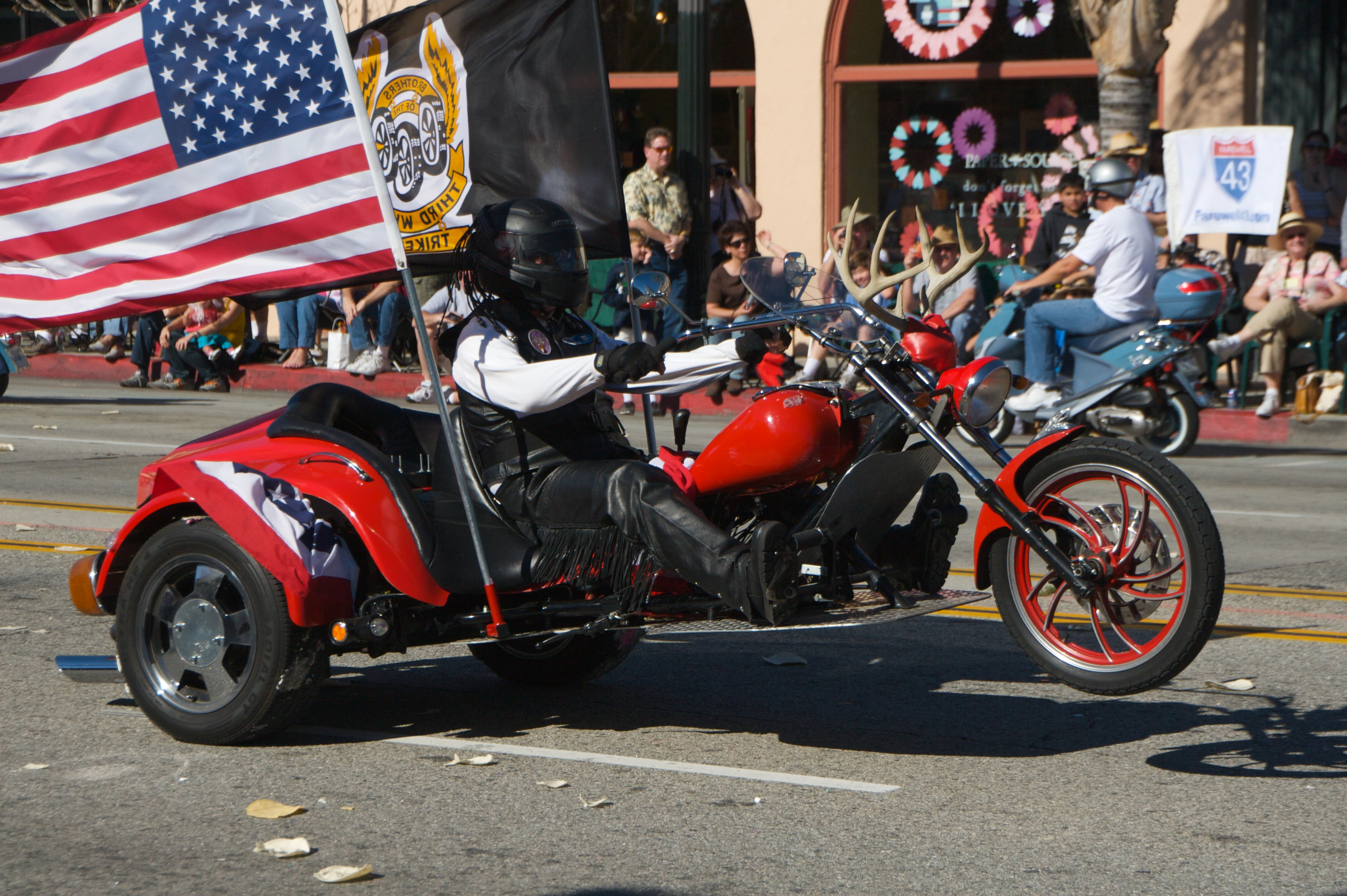
- Biker with an American flag Pasadena Doo Dah Parade, 2009
- Status: Active
- Genre: Parade
- Frequency: Annually
- Locations: Pasadena, California
- Country: USA
- Inaugurated: January 1, 1978
- Most recent: November 24, 2024
- Next event: TBA
- Organiser: Light Bringer Project
- Website: www.pasadenadoodahparade.info

The Pasadena Doo Dah Parade is a popular farcical and flamboyant parade held in Pasadena, California, about once a year.

The event has been copied by the Columbus, Ohio, Ocean City, New Jersey, and Kalamazoo, Michigan Doo Dah Parades. Norfolk, Virginia has a Doo Dah Parade but its connection to the Pasadena parade is uncertain.

== The original Pasadena parade ==
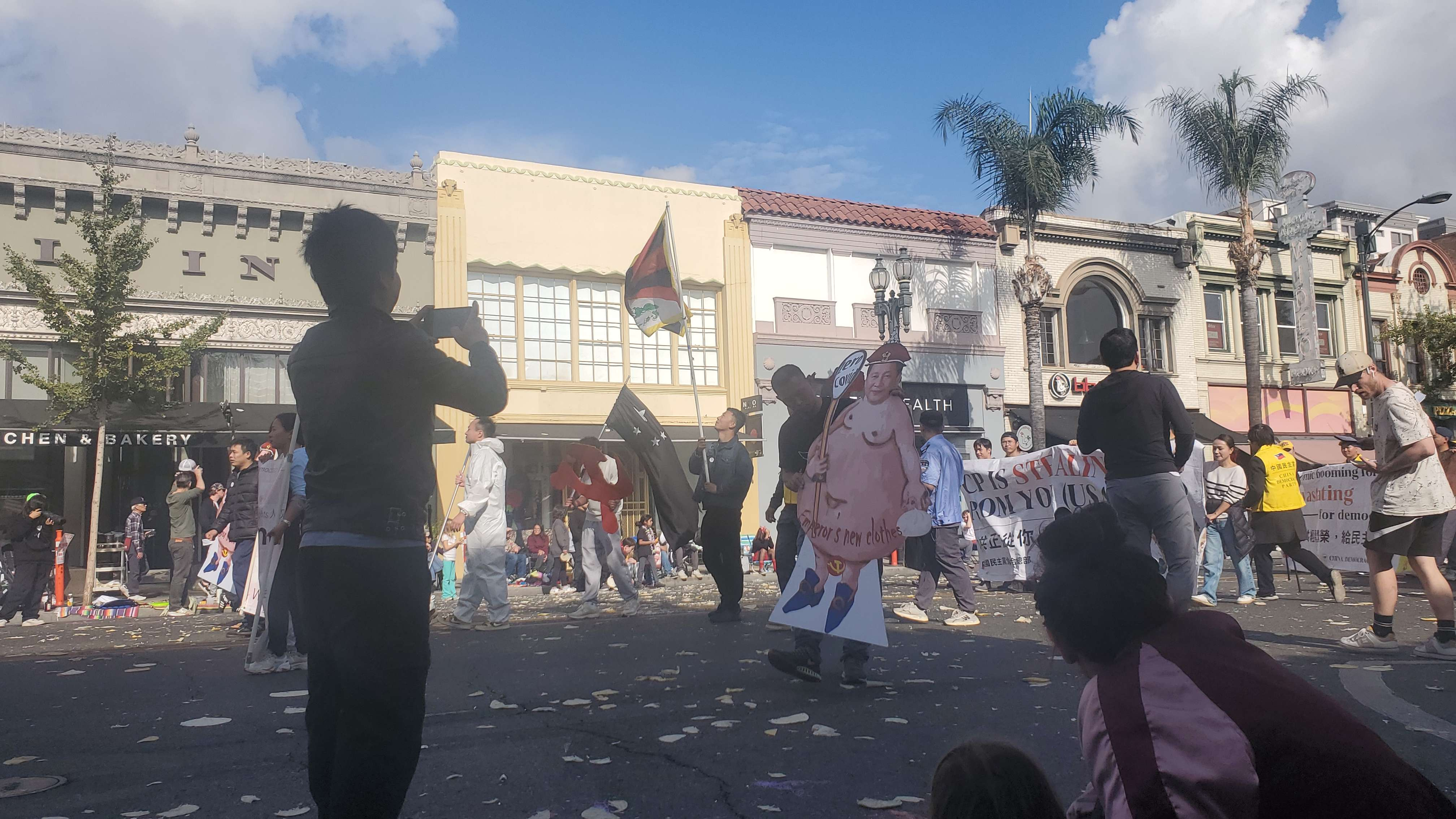
Paraders at the 2024 Pasadena Doo-Dah Parade protest the CCP.

=== Doo Dah history ===
Conceived in 1978 by several friends, including Peter Apanel, Ted Wright, Charles "Skip" Finnell, Corky Peterson, and Richard Caputo, sitting in a bar called the Loch Ness Monster Pub in Pasadena, California, as an irreverent alternative to the traditional formality of the Rose Parade, which is also held in Pasadena. In 1978, January 1 fell on a Sunday, and the Rose Parade, which typically takes place on January 1, will not march on a Sunday. So, they decided it would be fun to have an alternative parade on January 1 that year. It was the first Doo Dah Parade. Peter Apanel became the Czar of Parade who organized and oversaw all the parades through Doo Dah. 19. Some of the earliest parade participants were Corky Peterson as first Grand Marshall, Queen Dorothy Romani, the official band of the parade, Snotty Scotty & The Hankies, The Red Shoes Dance Team, The Loch Ness Bagpipe Band, the Pasadena Food Co-op Organic Vegetables Marching Band, Mimi Margo-go & the Marquis de Sod, The Wilson Brothers, Zeke The Shiek, The Espresso Bar, The Unknown Shoppers, belly dancer Narayana (who has participated in every Parade), and General Hershy Bar, among many others. The Doo Dah logo and all of the early parade posters were designed by Spike Loveland, a bartender at the Loch Ness Monster Pub. By about the 5th parade, the throwing of tortillas into and from the crowds became a signature event during the parade.

The first telecast of the Parade was Doo Dah 11 in 1987 with King John Fischer, produced and directed by John Helmore, which played on Pasadena Community Access Corporation (PCAC) on Cable Channel 56. PCAC produced and cablecast the Parade through Doo Dah 14. The first live telecast of the Doo Dah Parade was Doo Dah 15 on Los Angeles television KDOC Channel 56, hosted by Richard Simmons and Judy Tenuta.

=== Contemporary Doo Dah ===
The Pasadena Doo Dah Parade features absurd and unique participants such as the BBQ & Hibachi Marching Grill Team, the Shopping Cart Drill Team, the Bastard Sons of Lee Marvin, the Men of Leisure Synchronized Nap Team, The Marching Lumberjacks, The Army of Toy Soldiers, Claude Rains & the 20-Man Memorial Invisible Man Marching Drill Team, Uncle Fester, Count Smokula, the Radioactive Chicken Heads, and the Committee for the Right to Bear Arms, a group that marches in precise formations while carrying mannequin arms. Snotty Scotty and the Hankies is still the official band (even though Scotty died early). Many groups participate in the Doo Dah Parade as a fundraising effort for various charities. In 2010 the parade was moved to May 1, and also moved from Old Pasadena to East Pasadena. This Parade has spawned many others like it.

In August 2012, the Pasadena Museum of History opened an exhibit entitled, "What a Long, Strange Trip It's Been: 35 Years of the Pasadena Doo Dah Parade", containing donated items and photographs from the past 35 years of the parade and including a recreation of part of the original Chromo's bar. Over 400 people attended the opening reception, many in costume. In 2016, Route 66 Magazine ran a story on the Doo Dah parade.

In mid-July 2020, officials cited the COVID-19 pandemic as grounds for cancellation. Like the Rose Parade, which was postponed to 2022, the 43rd Doo Dah Parade was deferred to later that year, as 2021 was also called off. The parade was held again on November 19, 2023 in Old Pasadena.

In 2025, the Light Bringer Project (the non-profit organization behind the event) postponed Pasadena's Doo Dah Parade until 2026, due to the thousands of locals displaced by the Eaton wildfires and unsteady funding.

== Parades inspired by Pasadena Doo Dah ==
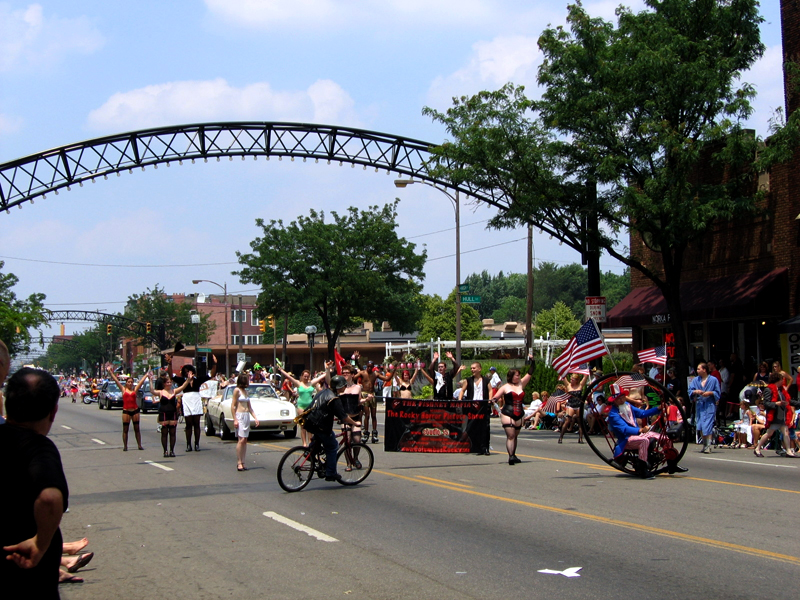
The 2005 Doo Dah Parade in Columbus, Ohio

=== Columbus Doo Dah Parade ===
A popular Doo Dah Parade takes place in Columbus, Ohio. The Columbus Doo Dah Parade was inspired by the Pasadena event and began in 1983 as a small, disorganized march down the sidewalks of High Street in The Short North district of the city by regulars of the Short North Tavern. The Columbus Doo Dah Parade takes place yearly on the Fourth of July (rain date, July 3) in the Short North and Victorian Village neighborhoods of Columbus. The parade route begins on Park Street near Goodale Park and ends at the Short North Tavern.

One of the most popular and longest-running participant groups is the Marching Fidels, a group dressed like Fidel Castro who take siestas along the parade route and conscript bystanders into the Cuban army, dressing them in camouflage and "forcing" them to march in the parade. Also featured are the Emperor of the Short North and the King and Queen of DooDah. In recent years, participants have included groups such as the Fishnet Mafia, the Wilber Hills Country Club, Feature Creatures Haunted Acting Troupe of Central Ohio, Four Men Walking Abreast (four men carrying a pink balloon adorned with a brighter pink spot in the middle), Deri Air, the Ohio Roller Derby, and the Doo Dah Band. At one time, the parade featured a limosine: a stretched Yugo. Judging takes place along the route and participants bribe judges to vote for their entries. Prizes for Best and Worst Entries are rewarded with gift certificates to Short North businesses.

=== Ocean City Doo Dah parade ===
A long-running parade, in Ocean City, New Jersey, is held every April (usually on the Saturday after Tax Day) on the New Jersey shore. The Ocean City DooDah Parade originally took place in Pitman, New Jersey, but migrated closer to the ocean a couple of years later. The route starts from 6th Street and goes down Asbury Avenue through downtown Ocean City, turns east on 12th Street and then proceeds up the boardwalk, ending at the historic Music Pier.

OC's parade is billed as a salute to humor and comedy, featuring impersonators of Groucho Marx, Charlie Chaplin, Marilyn Monroe, Elvis Presley, Abbott & Costello and many other classic movie stars. Celebrity comedians and TV stars have served as grand marshal in this parade, including Joan Rivers, Joe Franklin, Larry Storch, Mickey Rooney, Soupy Sales, Bill Dana, Captain Noah and many others. After his grand marshal appearance, legendary kids' TV host Soupy Sales became a regular guest at DooDah and following the parade, was honored by presiding over the "Pieasco" in which participants are invited to toss shaving cream pies at each other, just like the ones Soupy got hit with on his classic show. All parade participants receive a free commemorative T-shirt and hot dog courtesy of sponsor Dietz & Watson.

Other parade regulars include "Trash Buster" (played by chief DooDah organizer Mark Soifer from Ocean City's Community Affairs department), "Underdog Lady" Suzanne Muldowny, the "Wizard of Odd", the Pitman NJ Hobo Band, kids radio host Kathy O'Connell, and hundreds of dogs taking part in the annual Bassett Hound Waddle as part of the weekend's festivities. Also appearing are the costume character host and friends of the New York City cable & Internet TV show "Rapid T. Rabbit and Friends".

The parade recognizes those who support humor and entertainment that appear in the DooDah Parade by giving out award plaques in a ceremony at the Music Pier immediately at the conclusion of the march. The "Golden Hot Dog" award is given to those entertainers from the extended local area. The "Double Doggy DooDah Glutton-For-Punishment Award" is given to anyone who appears in the Ocean City Parade after being in any other DooDah Parade elsewhere in the country. Rapid T. Rabbit was the first such award recipient in 1995 after having marched in the Pasadena parade in the early 90s, and has also since appeared in the parades at Columbus, Ohio, and Illion, New York.

2020's parade was cancelled because of COVID-19 outbreak concerns.

=== Kalamazoo Doo Dah Parade ===
In 1984, WKMI (Kalamazoo, Michigan) started their version of the Doo Dah Parade (stylized Do-Dah). It was started by Lori Moore in reaction to the need for more fun, innovative, and silly family programming. The parade was a "spin off" from the Pasadena Parade. Similar to how the original Pasadena parade is an alternative to the traditional formality of the Rose Parade, the Kalamazoo Do-Dah parade is the opposite of the Kalamazoo Holiday parade. Additionally, it filled a need to provide a "silly parade" for all those businesses that could not meet the guidelines of the Holiday Parade. On average, the Kalamazoo Do-Dah Parade attracts about 60 units including 1,500 participants and approximately 40,000 spectators.

In the mid-1990s WKFR took over the parade operation and in 2004 they approached DKI to partner with them to host the parade and eventually take over the operation and ownership of the parade. As of 2015, the Kalamazoo Do-Dah Parade is now organized by the Kalamazoo Experiential Learning Center.

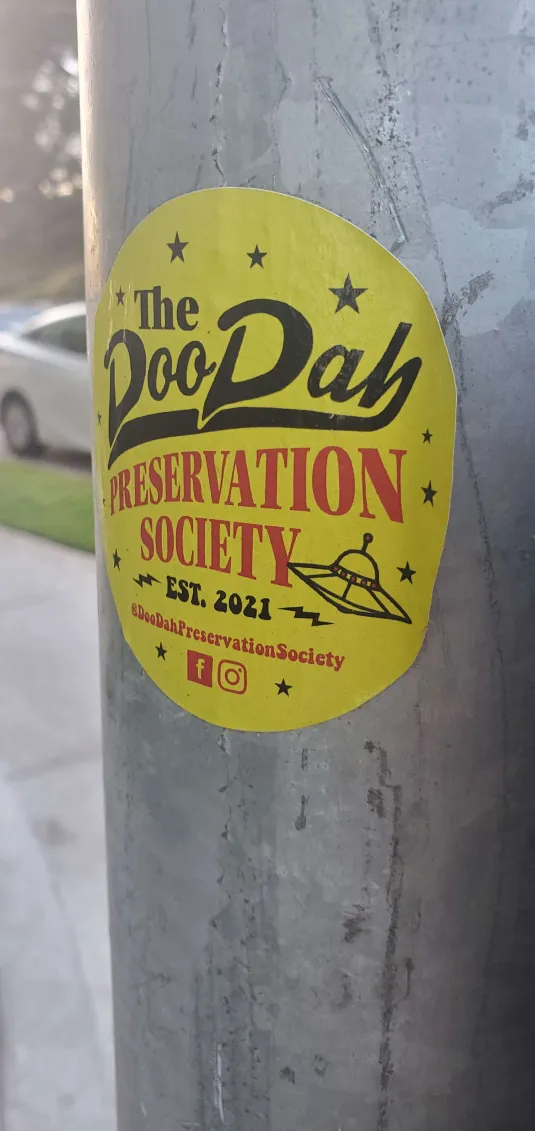
Doo-Dah Preservation Society sticker on a pedestrian push-button in Old Town Pasadena.
