= Charles Warren Stoddard =

American author and editor (1843–1909)

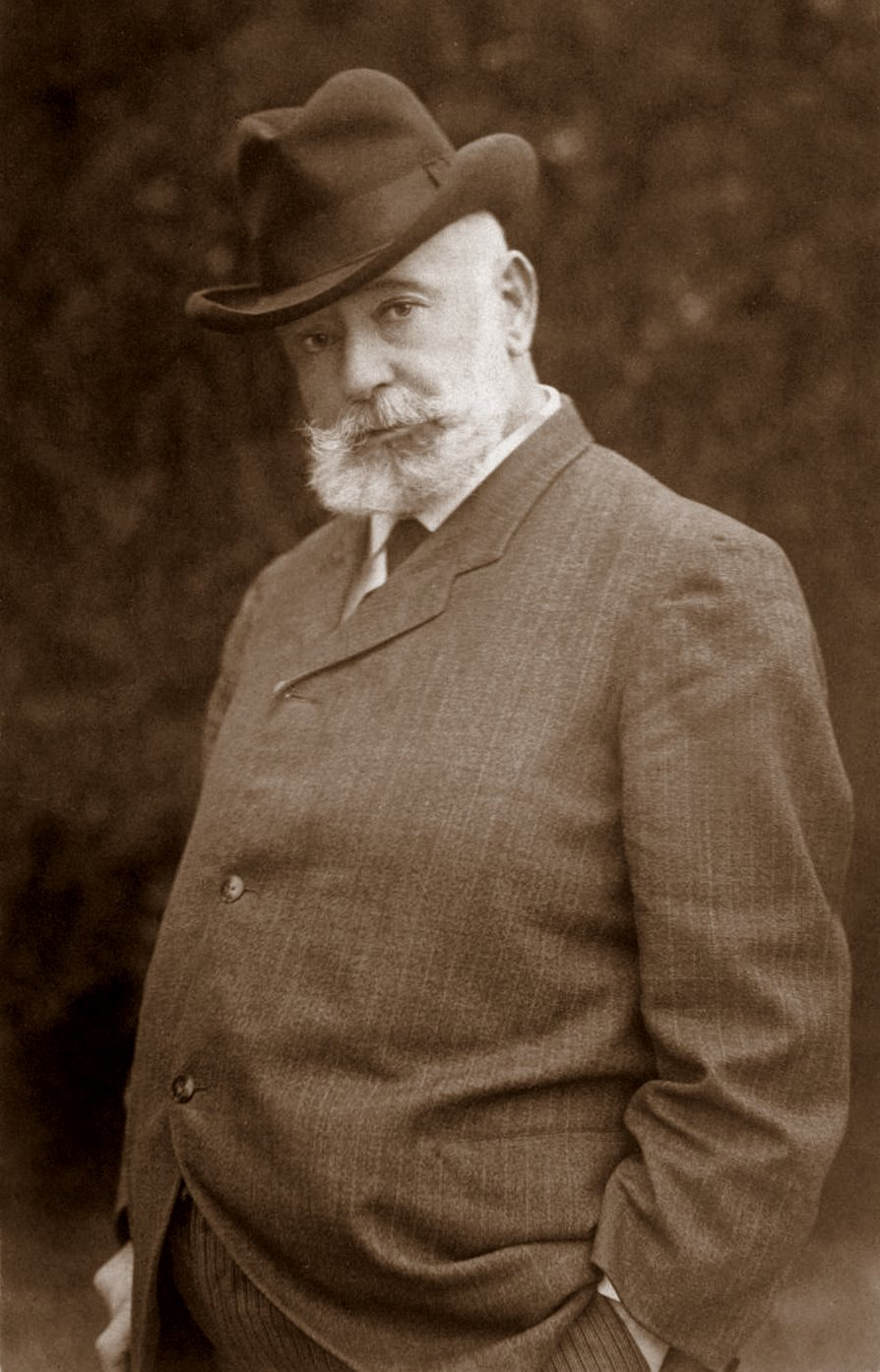
- Born: August 7, 1843; Rochester, New York, U.S.
- Died: April 23, 1909 (aged 65); Monterey, California, U.S.
- Resting place: San Carlos Cemetery, Monterey, California, U.S.

Charles Warren Stoddard (August 7, 1843 – April 23, 1909) was an American author and editor best known for his travel books about Polynesian life.

== Biography ==
Charles Warren Stoddard was born in Rochester, New York on August 7, 1843. He was descended in a direct line from Anthony Stoddard of England, who settled at Boston, Massachusetts, in 1639.

While he was still a child, he moved with his parents to New York City. In 1855, the family migrated to San Francisco, California when his father found a job at a mercantile firm. Stoddard was 11 and was immediately smitten with the city and, as he recalled, its "natural tendency to overdress, to over-decorate, to overdo almost everything". In 1857, he joined his ill brother Ned on a restorative trip to the East Coast, where they stayed at their grandfather's farm in western New York. He returned to San Francisco to rejoin his family by 1859.

Stoddard began writing verses at a young age amid the growing literary climate of California. His first published work saw print in The Golden Era for September 1862 under the pseudonym "Pip Pepperpod". He later recalled how he clandestinely slipped his contribution into the Era's mailbox without anyone knowing: "No member of my family suspected that I was so bold as to dream of entering the circle of the elect who wrote regularly every week for the chief literary organ west of the Rocky Mountains". His writings were well received and were later published as Poems by Charles Warren Stoddard. Poor health compelled him to give up his plans for a college education. He tried a career on the stage without success.

=== Polynesia ===
In 1864, Stoddard visited the South Sea Islands where he wrote South-Sea Idyls, a series of letters he sent to a friend. This friend had them published in book form in 1873. "They are," wrote William Dean Howells, "the lightest, sweetest, wildest, freshest things that were ever written about the life of that summer ocean," but are also exceedingly homoerotic. Stoddard made four other trips to the South Sea Islands, and wrote his impressions in Lazy Letters from Low Latitudes and The Island of Tranquil Delights.

Stoddard visited Molokai several times and became well acquainted with Father Damien–a Catholic saint since 2009–who ministered to the lepers there. Stoddard's The Lepers of Molokai, according to Robert Louis Stevenson, did much to establish Father Damien's position in public esteem. In 1867, soon after his first visit to the South Sea Islands, Stoddard was received into the Catholic Church. He told the story of his conversion in a small book, A Troubled Heart and How it was Comforted, of which he said: "Here you have my inner life all laid bare."

=== Friends ===
In 1867, Stoddard converted to Catholicism. In 1869, he became good friends with travel writer Theresa Yelverton.

In 1873, he started on a long tour as special correspondent of the San Francisco Chronicle. His roving commission carried no restrictions of any kind. For five years, he traveled through Europe and went as far east as Palestine and Egypt. He sent considerable material to his newspaper, much of which it never printed, though some of it was among his best work. Around 1880, Stoddard served co-editor of the Overland Monthly with Bret Harte and Ina Coolbrith.

In 1891, Stoddard spent the summer aboard the yacht "Ramona" owned by Bohemian Club darling Harry Gillig and his wife, heiress Aimee Crocker, sailing the Atlantic Coast. Other guests of the pleasure boat were painter Theodore Wores, playwrights Augustus Thomas and Clay Greene, editor Jerome Hart, and actor Henry Woodruff.

=== Notre Dame ===
In 1885, having decided to settle down, he accepted the position of chair of the English literature department at the University of Notre Dame. He resigned, officially citing malaria. According to literary historian Roger Austen has written that the real reason behind Stoddard's decision was the Catholic Church's position on homosexuality. John W. Crowley maintains that Stoddard clashed with colleagues over his attentions to the students.

The same reasons, whether limited to ill-health or also related to behavioral matters, caused him to resign a corresponding position that he held at the Catholic University of America in Washington, D.C. from 1889 to 1902. In a short time, he moved to Cambridge, Massachusetts, intending to devote himself exclusively to literary work. A serious and almost fatal illness interfered with his plans. He published his Exits and Entrances, a book of essays and sketches which he called his favorite work, probably because it told of his friendship with Stevenson and of other literary acquaintances.

In April 1903, he returned to San Francisco and was the guest of honor at a welcome-home party at the Bohemian Club with Henry James and Enrico Caruso in attendance. He then settled in Monterey, California, with a hope of recovering his health, although he traveled within California and was in San Francisco during the 1906 San Francisco earthquake and fire.

He stayed on in Monterey, where he was diagnosed with heart disease, until his death from a heart attack on April 23, 1909.

=== Private life ===
Stoddard was homosexual. He praised South Sea societies' receptiveness to homosexual liaisons and lived in relationships with men.

From San Francisco, late in 1866, Stoddard sent his newly published Poems to Herman Melville, along with news that in Hawaii he had found no traces of Melville. Having written even more fervently to Walt Whitman, Stoddard had been excited by Typee, finding the Kory-Kory character so stimulating that he wrote a story celebrating the sort of male friendships to which Melville had more than once alluded. From the poems Stoddard sent, Melville may have sensed no homosexual undercurrent, and the extant draft of his reply in January 1867 is noncommittal.

Francis Millet, a well-regarded American Academic Classicist artist, had a studio in Rome in the early 1870s and Venice in the mid-1870s, where he lived with Stoddard. Author Jonathan Ned Katz presents letters from Millet to Stoddard that suggest they had a romantic and intimate affair while living a bohemian life together. Amy Sueyoshi additionally traces Stoddard's affair with Yone Noguchi through their passionate correspondence to one another.

In the film Leonie, Stoddard (portrayed by Patrick Weathers) is shown being flirtatious with the character Yone Noguchi.

== Works ==
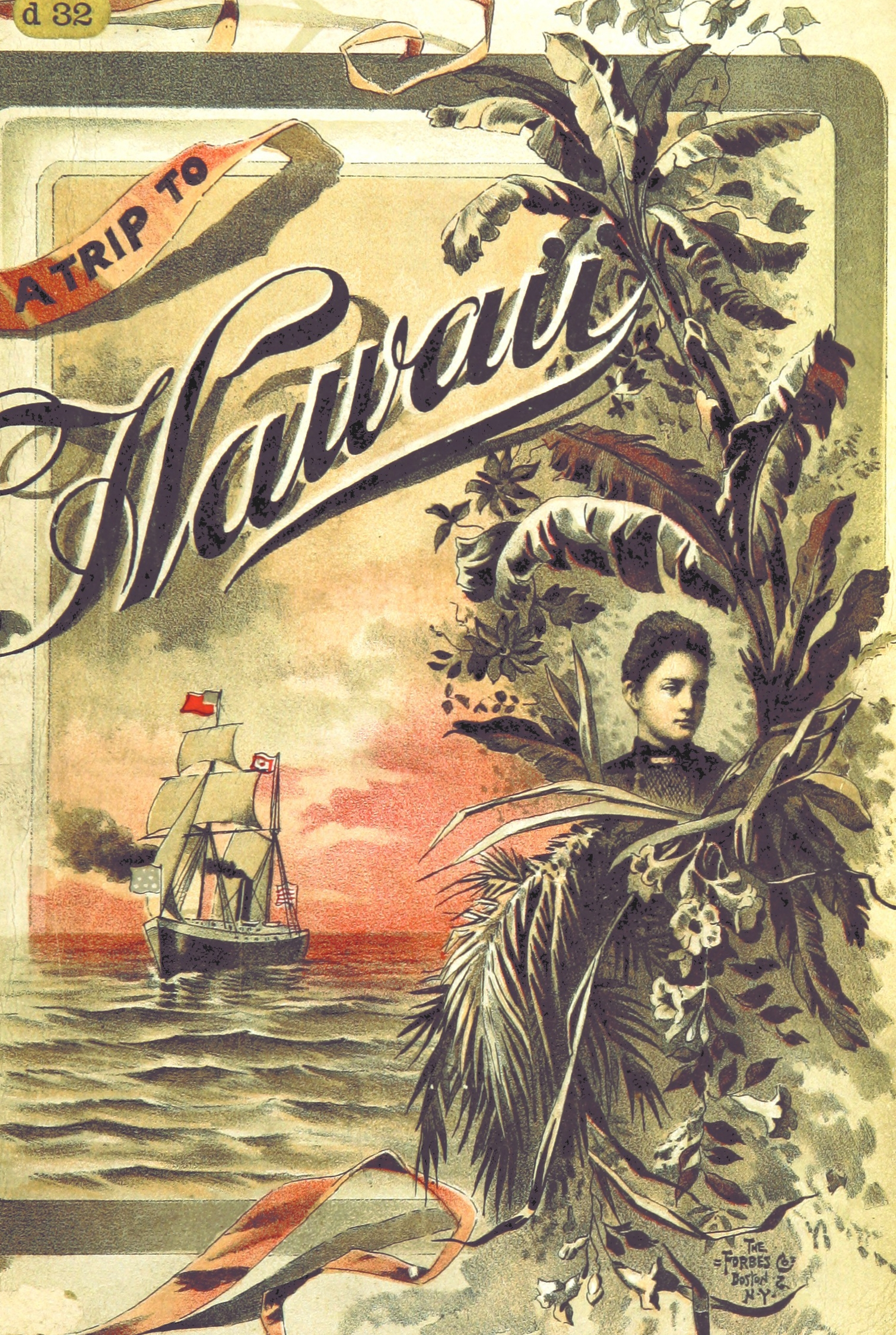
Image extracted A Trip to Hawaii (edition 1892)

He said of his only novel, For the Pleasure of His Company, "Here you have my Confessions." So strictly biographical are most of his writings that Stoddard hoped by supplying a few missing links to enable the reader to trace out the whole story of his life.

Besides the books already mentioned, he wrote:

- South Sea Idylls (1873)
- Summer Cruising in the South Seas (1874)
- Marshallah, a Flight into Egypt (1885);
- A Trip to Hawaii (1885)
- In the Footprints of the Padres (1902)
- Cruising among the Caribbees (1893)
- Hawaiian Life (1894)
- Saint Anthony, The Wonder-Worker of Padua (1896)
- A Cruise under the Crescent (1898)
- Over the Rocky Mountains to Alaska (1899)
- Father Damien, a Sketch (1903)
- For the Pleasure of His Company (1903)
- With Staff and Scrip (1904)
- Hither and Yon
- The Confessions of a Reformed Poet (1907)
- The Dream Lady (1907)

== Bibliography ==
- Austen, Roger, Stoddard's Little Tricks in South Sea Idyls in Kellogg, Stuart (ed.) Literary Visions of Homosexuality, The Haworth Press, New York 1983, ISBN 0-86656-183-8
- Austen, Roger, Genteel Pagan: The Double Life of Charles Warren Stoddard, The University of Massachusetts Press, Amherst 1995, ISBN 978-0870239809
