= The American Diary of a Japanese Girl =

1901 book by Yone Noguchi

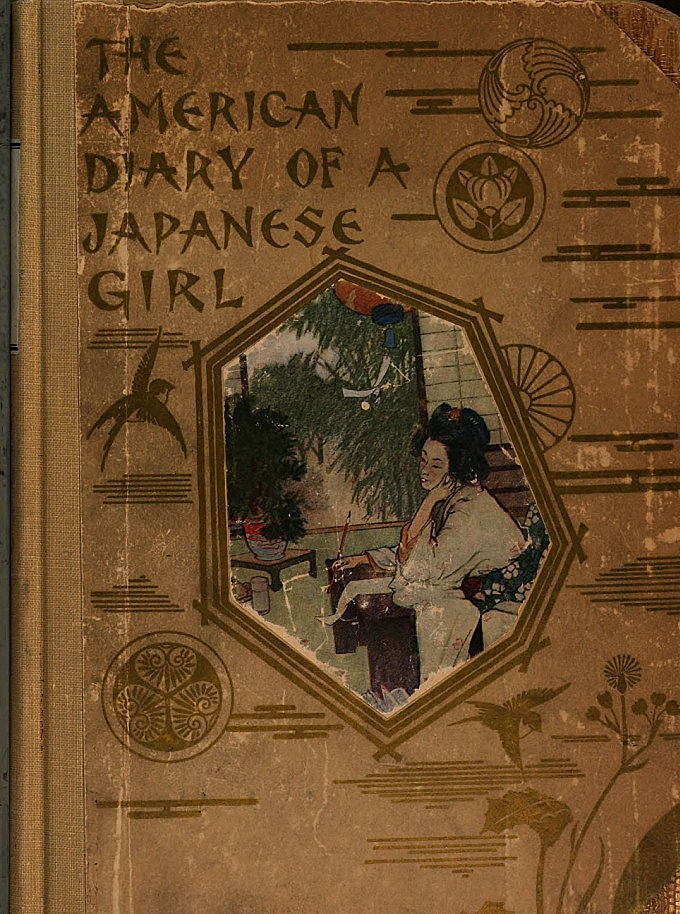
- Cover of the Stokes edition
- Author: Yone Noguchi
- Language: English
- Publisher: Frederick A. Stokes
- Publication date: 1901
- Publication place: United States
- OCLC: 15665915

The American Diary of a Japanese Girl is the first English-language novel published in the United States by a Japanese writer. Acquired for Frank Leslie's Illustrated Monthly Magazine by editor Ellery Sedgwick in 1901, it appeared in two excerpted installments in November and December of that year with illustrations by Genjiro Yeto. In 1902, it was published in book form by the New York firm of Frederick A. Stokes. Marketed as the authentic diary of an 18-year-old female visitor to the United States named "Miss Morning Glory" (Asagao), it was in actuality the work of Yone Noguchi, who wrote it with the editorial assistance of Blanche Partington and Léonie Gilmour.

== Plot ==
The book describes Morning Glory's preparations, activities and observations as she undertakes her transcontinental American journey with her uncle, a wealthy mining executive. Arriving in San Francisco by steamship, they stay briefly at the Palace Hotel before moving to a "high-toned boarding house" in Nob Hill. Through the American wife of the Japanese consul, Morning Glory befriends Ada, a denizen of Van Ness Avenue with a taste for coon songs, who introduces her to Golden Gate Park and vaudeville and is in turn initiated by Morning Glory in the ways of kimono. Morning Glory briefly takes over proprietorship of a cigar store on the edge of San Francisco Chinatown before moving to the rustic Oakland home of an eccentric local poet named Heine (a character based on Joaquin Miller). After some days there spent developing her literary skills and a romantic interest with local artist Oscar Ellis, and a brief excursion to Los Angeles, she departs with her uncle for Chicago and New York, continuing, along the way, her satirical observations on various aspects of American life and culture. The novel closes with Morning Glory's declared intention to continue her investigations into American life by taking a job as a domestic servant, thus preparing the way for a sequel.

== Editions ==
Noguchi had already written the sequel, The American Letters of a Japanese Parlor-Maid, at the time of the American Diary's publication, but Stokes, citing lackluster sales, declined to publish the sequel, thus obliging Noguchi to defer publication until his return to Japan in 1904. There, Tokyo publisher Fuzanbo issued a new edition of The American Diary of a Japanese Girl (this time under Noguchi's own name, with an appendix documenting the book's history) as well as The American Letters of a Japanese Parlor-Maid (1905), published with a preface by Tsubouchi Shoyo. Another publisher issued Noguchi's Japanese translation of The American Diary of a Japanese Girl under the title 邦文日本少女の米國日記 in 1905. In 1912, Fuzanbo published a new edition of The American Diary with a fold-out illustration (kuchi-e) by ukiyo-e artist Eiho Hirezaki, which was also sold under the imprint of London publisher and bookseller Elkin Mathews. In 2007, The American Diary of a Japanese Girl was reissued in an annotated edition by Temple University Press.
