= Rebecca Lepkoff =

American photographer (1916–2014)

Rebecca Lepkoff (née Brody; August 4, 1916 – August 17, 2014) was an American photographer. She is best known for her images depicting daily life on the Lower East Side of Manhattan in the 1940s.

== Biography ==
Rebecca Lepkoff (née Brody) was born August 4, 1916, on Hester Street on the Lower East Side of Manhattan, the daughter of Isadore Brody and Anna Rose Schwartz, Jewish emigrants from Minsk, Russian Empire (now Belarus), who arrived in New York City in 1910. Isadore Brody was a tailor who quickly adjusted to life in the United States, while his wife, Anna, found her new life difficult and resisted becoming Americanized. Living in tenements, the growing family moved several times but always remained within the boundaries of the Lower East Side. In time, the family of eight was living in a two-bedroom tenement apartment, but Rebecca recalled many early happy memories. In 1927, her mother, shortly after the birth of her youngest daughter, suffered a nervous breakdown and never fully recovered. Rebecca's older sister, Celia, then 13, took on most of the responsibility of maintaining the family, and to work, dressed up and claimed she was 16.

The breakdown of her mother had a profound impact on the family, and Rebecca struggled through junior high school. She then attended Seward Park High School but dropped out at age 16, as the brunt of the Great Depression bore down on the Lower East Side. Of the period, she noted:

I didn't have many clothes and [the teachers] would criticize what I was wearing; and they said my fingernails weren't filed right. And so, I just quit. I quit, and I didn't tell anybody. I just used to go to the Seward Park Library in the morning. The whole term, I read through all the classics—all the books in the library, from eight to three o'clock. And I think I got a wonderful education that year.

Later, she attended night school and earned her high school diploma.

In her teenage years, it was sports and her newly discovered athletic ability that drove her forward. "I became very good as an athlete," she noted, and "Seward Park had [organized] competitions in the playground...They had races and whatnot. And I caught a couple of medals—in the 100 yard dash. I was pretty good, physically." She also took gymnastic classes and played basketball at the Educational Alliance, a settlement house and community center on the Lower East Side.

It was at the Educational Alliance that she was introduced to modern dance, and her interest piqued, she soon discovered a passion. "I started feeling better when I danced," she recalled, as dancing proved an antidote to a difficult family life. She fell in with the Experimental Dance Group, a company led by Bill Matons, and was soon performing at museums and colleges. Eventually, she became a dance instructor with the group. In 1937, at age 21, she was awarded a scholarship to the Doris Humphrey–Charles Weidman Dance Group. Still, to provide income to her family with whom she still lived, she worked seasonally in the garment industry, working in a button factory and sewing seams in another.

In 1939, she was hired to work as a dancer at the New York World's Fair, where she performed routines in a staging about the history of railroads. She received equity pay, and with part of the proceeds, purchased a camera. This soon developed into another passion: photography. She enrolled in photography classes offered free by the New Deal's National Youth Administration, which, advantageously, had an office on the Lower East Side. The director of the program was photographer Arnold Eagle, of whom she had fond memories. She also recalled during this period that "there were times I didn't have a change of clothes ... You would wear your shoes down to nothing, and you wouldn't be able to buy [new ones]."

In 1940, the U.S. Census captured Rebecca, at age 24, living with her family at 221 East Broadway, only a block from the Seward Park Library. The size of the family was now six, as her older sister Celia and younger brother Samuel had moved out. Her occupation was listed as "dancer." The apartment building at 221 East Broadway still exists. Now called "The Mayflower," it may be the only extant Lower East Side structure where the Brody family resided. In 1941, Rebecca married Eugene Lepkoff, whom she had met in a dance class. He was soon drafted and served in an artillery unit in Europe during World War II. After his return, the couple chose to settle in an apartment at 343 Cherry Street on the Lower East Side, though many young Jewish couples at the time were moving away to Long Island or New Jersey.

Lepkoff died Sunday, August 17, 2014, at her home in Townshend, Vermont. Two weeks prior to her death, she had turned 98.

== Photographer ==
Fascinated by the area where she lived, she first photographed Essex and Hester Street which, she recalls, "were full of pushcarts." They no longer exist today but then "everyone was outside: the mothers with their baby carriages, and the men just hanging out." Her photographs captured people in the streets, especially children, as well as the buildings and the signs on store fronts.

In 1950, she also photographed people at work and play in Vermont. The images were used to illustrate the book Almost Utopia: The Residents and Radicals of Pikes Falls, Vermont, 1950, published by the Vermont Historical Society. They present the area before its character was changed with paved roads and vacationers. In the 1970s, she photographed the next generation of inhabitants in a series she called Vermont Hippies.

Rebecca Lepkoff was an active member of the Photo League from 1947 until 1951 when it was dissolved as a "communist organization" in the McCarthy era.

== Published works ==
- Dans, Peter; Wasserman, Suzanne (2006). Life on the Lower East Side: Photographs by Rebecca Lepkoff, 1937-1950. Princeton Architectural Press. ISBN 978-1-56898-606-7.
- Lepkoff, Rebecca (May 2008). Almost Utopia: Residents and Radicals of Pikes Falls, Vermont 1950. Vermont Historical Society. ISBN 978-0-934720-54-0.
