= Ethel Armes =

American author, journalist, and historian (1876–1945)

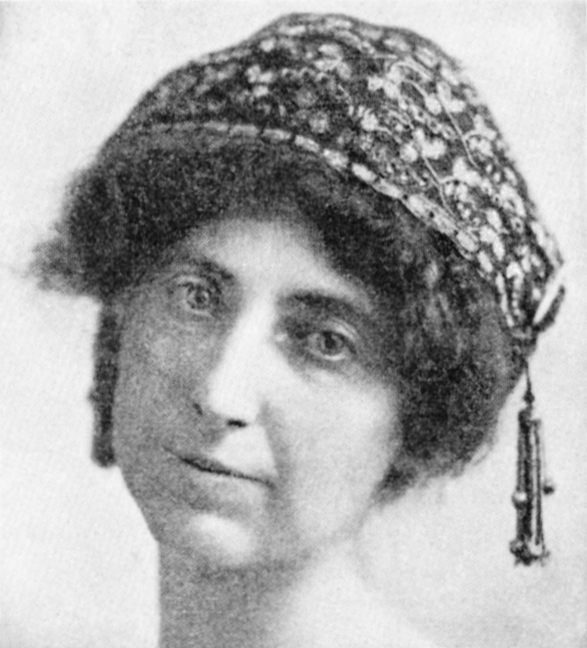
- Ethel Armes 1915
- Born: Ethel Marie Armes; December 31, 1876 Washington, D.C., U.S.
- Died: September 28, 1945 (aged 68) Peterborough, New Hampshire, U.S.
- Resting place: Oak Hill Cemetery; Washington, D.C.
- Occupation: journalist; author; historian
- Children: 1
- Parents: George Augustus Armes
- Relatives: John Bozman Kerr (grandfather)

Ethel Marie Armes (1876 – 1945) was an American journalist, author and historian.

== Biography ==
Ethel Marie Armes was born in Washington, D.C., to Col. George Augustus Armes and Lucy Hamilton Kerr (daughter of John Bozman Kerr), Armes was raised in Washington, D.C., where she attended private schools. She worked as a reporter for the Chicago Chronicle in 1899 and then The Washington Post during 1900–1903.

During the period from 1905–06 Armes was on the staff of the Birmingham Age-Herald and performed syndicated work for magazines and newspapers. She authored a number of important historical works.

In 1904 Armes became engaged to the Japanese poet Yone Noguchi and planned to join him in Japan, but broke off the engagement after learning that, during their engagement, he had been sexually involved with another woman, Léonie Gilmour, who had borne his child (future artist Isamu Noguchi).

Armes never married, but in 1925 she adopted a ten year old girl, Catherine, to whom she had been a foster parent. Her daughter married Richard W. Millar, and had two children.

Armes' burial site is at Oak Hill Cemetery, with her mother, Lucy Hamilton Kerr Armes, in Washington, D.C.

== Selected works ==
- Midsummer in Whittier's country: a little study of Sandwich Center, Advance Press, 1905.
- The Story of Coal and Iron in Alabama (original edition published by the Birmingham Chamber of Commerce, 1910), Beechwood Books, 1987.
- Studies of Red Mountain from my balcony: a fugitive essay (originally published as Christmas Booklet Number One, Pathfinder, 1911), J.P. Cather & H.W. Brown, 1982.
- The Washington manor house: England's gift to the world, co-authored with Sulgrave Institution, New York, 1922.
- Stratford on the Potomac, co-authored with Sidney Lanier, Catherine Claiborne Armes, etal., William Alexander Jr. Chapter, United Daughters of the Confederacy, 1928.
- Stratford Hall: The Great House of the Lees, Garrett & Massie, 1936.
