= Amy Sueyoshi =

American historian

Provost of San Francisco State University
- Incumbent
- Assumed office July 1, 2022
- Preceded by: Jennifer Summit

Personal details
- Born: February 4, 1971 (age 55)
- Scientific career
- Education: Barnard College; University of California, Los Angeles
- Fields: Ethnic Studies
- Workplaces: San Francisco State University

Amy Sueyoshi is the provost of San Francisco State University. Sueyoshi is a historian specializing in sexuality, gender, and race. Her publications and lectures focus on issues regarding race and sexuality such as cross-dressing, pornography, and marriage equality.

== Bio ==
Sueyoshi began teaching at SFSU in 2002 as an assistant professor in Race and Resistance Studies and Sexuality Studies. She has a B.A. from Barnard College and a Ph.D. from UCLA. She is the author of a book on Yone Noguchi, Queer Compulsions: Race, Nation, and Sexuality in the Affairs of Yone Noguchi (2012), and has written a second book manuscript Sex Acts: Race, Leisure, and Power in Turn-of-the-Century San Francisco, under review at University of Colorado Press. In addition to her academic and scholarly work, Sueyoshi is an activist and leader in the LGBTQIA community in the San Francisco Bay Area and nationally.

Sueyoshi served as dean of SFSU's College of Ethnic Studies, the first college in the nation to house the five departments of Africana Studies, American Indian Studies, Asian American Studies, Latina/o Studies, and Race and Resistance Studies. She was named provost of SFSU in April 2022, the first person of color to serve as provost.

== Publications ==
Sueyoshi's Publications 1993–present.

=== Books ===
- Queer Compulsions: Race, Nation, and Sexuality in the Affairs of Yone Noguchi(Honolulu: University of Hawai'i Press, 2012)
- Introduction reprinted in Journal of Transnational American Studies 4, no. 1 (2012) available at: http://escholarship.org/uc/acgcc_jtas.

=== Articles, essays, and edited collections ===
- "What Western History Means to Me," Western Historical Association Newsletter: Special Issue – Queer History in the West (Spring 2013): 25-28.
- "Making Whites from the Dark Side: Teaching Whiteness Studies at San Francisco State University," The History Teacher 46, no. 3 (May 2013): 373-396.
- "Miss Morning Glory: Orientalism and Misogyny in the Queer Writings of Yone Noguchi," Amerasia Journal – Special Issue: Further Desire 37, no. 2 (2011): 2-27.
- "Intimate Inequalities: Interracial Affection and Same-sex Love in the 'Heterosexual' life of Yone Noguchi, 1897–1909," Journal of American Ethnic History 29, no. 4 (Summer 2010): 22-44.
- "Finding Fellatio: Friendship, History and Yone Noguchi," in Embodying Asian American Sexualities, Gina Masequesmay and Sean Metzger, ed., (Lanham, MD: Lexington Books, 2009): 157-172.
- "InnovAsian in Pornography: Asian American Masculinity and the Porno Revolution," in 21st Century Sexualities: Contemporary Issues in Health, Education and Rights, ed. Gilbert Herdt and Cymene Howe (New York: Routledge, 2007), 78-80.
- Guest Editor, Amerasia Journal- Special Issue: Asian Americans and the Marriage Equality Debate 32, no.1 (2006).
- "Friday the Thirteenth – Love, Commitment, and then Catastrophe: Personal Reflections on the Marriage Equality Movement," Amerasia Journal- Special Issue: Asian Americans and the Marriage Equality Debate 32, no.1 (2006): xi-xvii.
- "Mindful Masquerades: Que(e)rying Japanese Immigrant Dress in Turn-of-the-Century San Francisco," Frontiers: A Journal of Women Studies 26, no. 3 (2005): 67-100.
- To be reprinted in Contingent Maps: Rethinking the North American West and Western Women's History (Tucson: University of Arizona Press, 2014), in press.
- "Sexuality and Asian Pacific Islander History," Asian Pacific American Collective History Project, 2004 [online]; available from https://web.archive.org/web/20101229003528/http://apachp.net/; Internet.

=== Opinion-editorials ===
- "For a More Queer-Friendly Japanese America," Nichi Bei Weekly, 29 July 2010 – 4 August 2010, p. 2.
- "Threat to Asians," San Francisco Chronicle, 21 April 2010, p. A15, https://www.sfgate.com/opinion/article/Letters-to-the-editor-3191770.php

=== Book reviews ===
- Review of Stranger Intimacy: Contesting Race, Sexuality, and Law in the North American West by Nayan Shah, Pacific Historical Review 82, no. 2 (May 2013): 297-298.
- Review of Doctor Mom Chung of the Fair-Haired Bastards: The Life of a Wartime Celebrity by Judy Tzu-Chun Wu, Journal of American Ethnic History (Fall 2005): 113-115.
- Review of The Making of a Gay Asian Community: An Oral History of Pre-AIDS Los Angeles by Eric C. Wat, Journal of the History of Sexuality 12, no. 3 (July 2003): 504-506.
- Review of If They Don't Bring Their Women Here: Chinese Female Immigration Before Exclusion by George Anthony Peffer, Law and History Review 20, no.2 (Summer 2002): 421-423.
- Review of Asian American Sexualities edited by Russell Leong and Q& A: Queer in Asian America edited by David Eng and Alice Y. Hom in Amerasia Journal 25, no.1 (1999): 194-200.

=== Creative works ===
- "The Same-sex Wedding Album, Amy & Sheree," American Sexuality Magazine 2, no.3, March 2004 [journal on-line]; available from http://nsrc.sfsu.edu/HTMLArticle.cfm?Article=271&PageID=75&SID=FBE8414B3...Internet.
