= Yone Noguchi =

Japanese writer and poet (1875–1947)

Yonejirō Noguchi
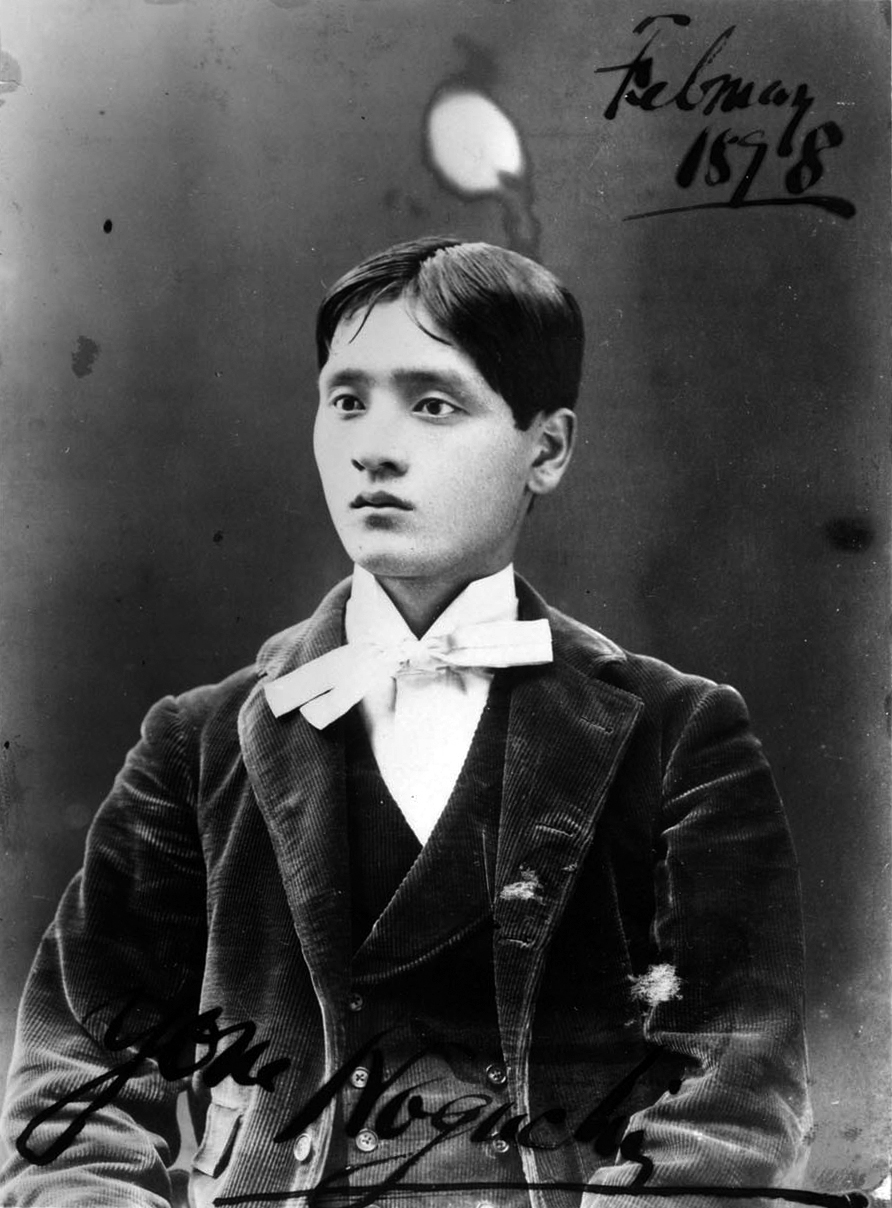
- Born: December 8, 1875; Tsushima, Aichi, Japan
- Died: July 13, 1947 (aged 71); Tokyo, Japan
- Occupations: Poet essayist literary critic
- Spouse: Matsu Takeda
- Partners: Ethel Armes; Léonie Gilmour
- Children: Isamu Noguchi
- Writing career
- Pen name: Yone Noguchi
- Period: 1897–1947
- Literary movement: Imagism

Yonejirō Noguchi (野口 米次郎, Noguchi Yonejirō; December 8, 1875 – July 13, 1947), also known as Yone Noguchi, was a Japanese writer, poet, essayist and literary critic in both English and Japanese. He was the father of sculptor Isamu Noguchi.

== Biography ==
=== Early life in Japan ===
Noguchi was born in what is now part of the city of Tsushima, near Nagoya. He attended Keio University in Tokyo, where he was exposed to the works of Thomas Carlyle and Herbert Spencer, and also expressed interests in haiku and Zen. He lived for a time in the home of Shiga Shigetaka, editor of the magazine Nihonjin, but left before graduating to travel to San Francisco in November 1893.

=== California ===
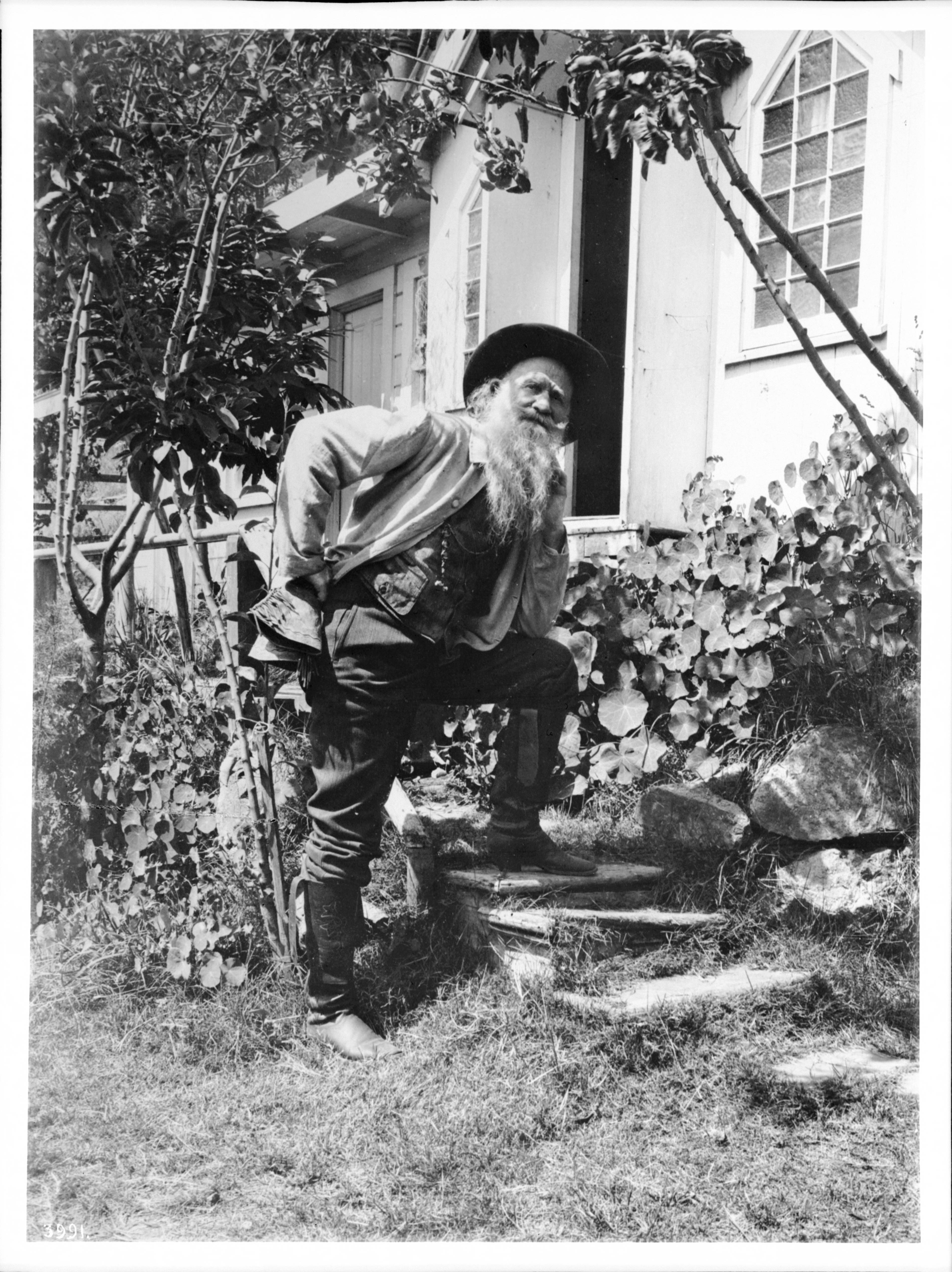
Joaquin Miller circa 1898

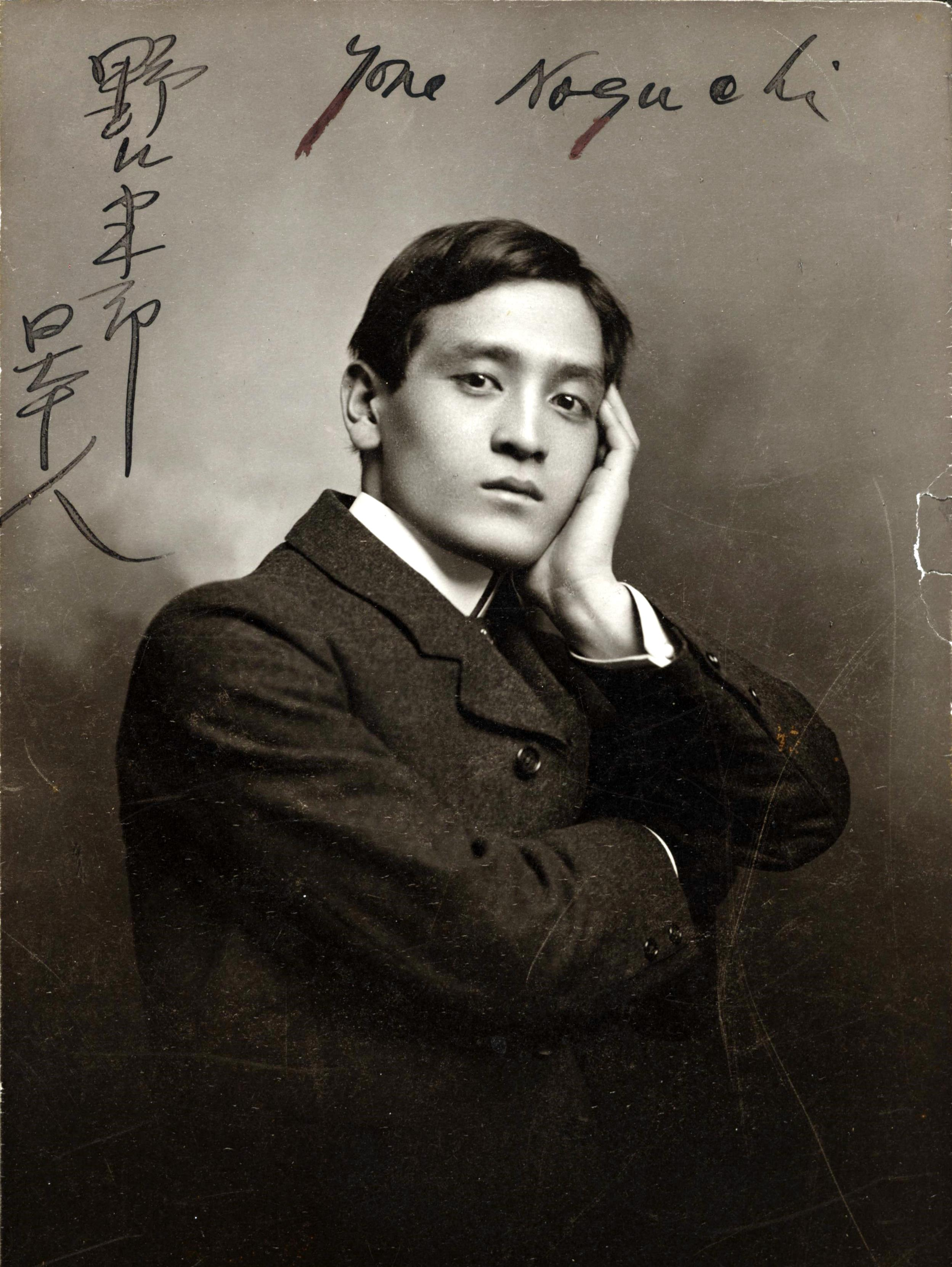
Yone Noguchi in 1903

Noguchi arrived in San Francisco on November 19, 1893. There, he joined a newspaper run by Japanese exiles associated with the Freedom and People's Rights Movement and worked as a domestic servant. He spent some months at Palo Alto, California studying at a preparatory school for Stanford University but returned to journalistic work in San Francisco during the Sino-Japanese War.

On a visit to the Oakland hillside home of Joaquin Miller after the war ended, Noguchi decided his true vocation was to be a poet. Miller welcomed and encouraged Noguchi and introduced him to other San Francisco Bay area bohemians, including Gelett Burgess (who published Noguchi's first verses in his magazine, The Lark), Ina Coolbrith, Edwin Markham, Adeline Knapp, Blanche Partington, and Charles Warren Stoddard.

Noguchi weathered a plagiarism scandal in 1896 to publish two books of poetry in 1897, and remained an important fixture of the Bay Area literary scene until his departure to the East Coast in May 1900.

=== Further travels ===
Stopping in Chicago for several weeks, Noguchi befriended artist William Denslow, writer Onoto Watanna, and journalist Frank Putnam, and was invited to write his impressions of the city for the Chicago Evening Post.

He initially found New York unwelcoming. In September 1900 he made his long-awaited visit to Charles Warren Stoddard in Washington D.C. "After many years of passionate correspondence across long distances," writes historian Amy Sueyoshi, "they had finally consummated their affection for one another in person." From 1900 to 1904, Noguchi's primary base was New York City. There, with the help of editor and future lover Léonie Gilmour, he completed work on his first novel, The American Diary of a Japanese Girl, and a sequel, The American Letters of a Japanese Parlor-Maid.

Noguchi then sailed to England, where (with the help of his artist friend Yoshio Markino) he published and promoted his third book of poetry, From the Eastern Sea, and formed connections with leading literary figures like William Michael Rossetti, Laurence Binyon, William Butler Yeats, Thomas Hardy, Laurence Housman, Arthur Symons and the young Arthur Ransome.

His London success brought him some attention on his return to New York in 1903, and he formed productive new friendships with American writers like Edmund Clarence Stedman, Zona Gale, and even Mary MacLane, but he continued to have difficulty publishing in the United States. He spent much of the summer of 1903 selling curios at Kushibiki and Arai's "Japan by Night" installation at Madison Square Garden, “doing a pretty good business, selling things between 7 and 12 dollars a night,” telling Stoddard it was “awfully jolly to do such a thing upon the roof full of fresh air and music.”

Noguchi's situation changed dramatically with the onset of the Russo-Japanese War in 1904, as his writings on various aspects of Japanese culture were suddenly in great demand among magazine and newspaper editors. In addition to translations of war news from the Japanese press, he was able to publish a number of seminal articles at this time, including "A Proposal to American Poets," in which he advised American poets to "try Japanese hokku."

=== Romantic entanglements ===
While in the United States, Noguchi became romantically involved with Charles Warren Stoddard, Léonie Gilmour and Ethel Armes. He had begun an amorous correspondence with Stoddard while still in California, and acknowledged that they slept in the same bed when he visited Stoddard in Washington, D.C., in 1900. He had met Ethel Armes at Stoddard's by Christmas 1901. He had hired Léonie Gilmour as an English teacher and editor in February 1901. By the end of 1903 Noguchi was secretly married to Gilmour and secretly engaged to Armes. Stoddard, when informed about the Armes engagement, repeatedly begged Noguchi to end it.

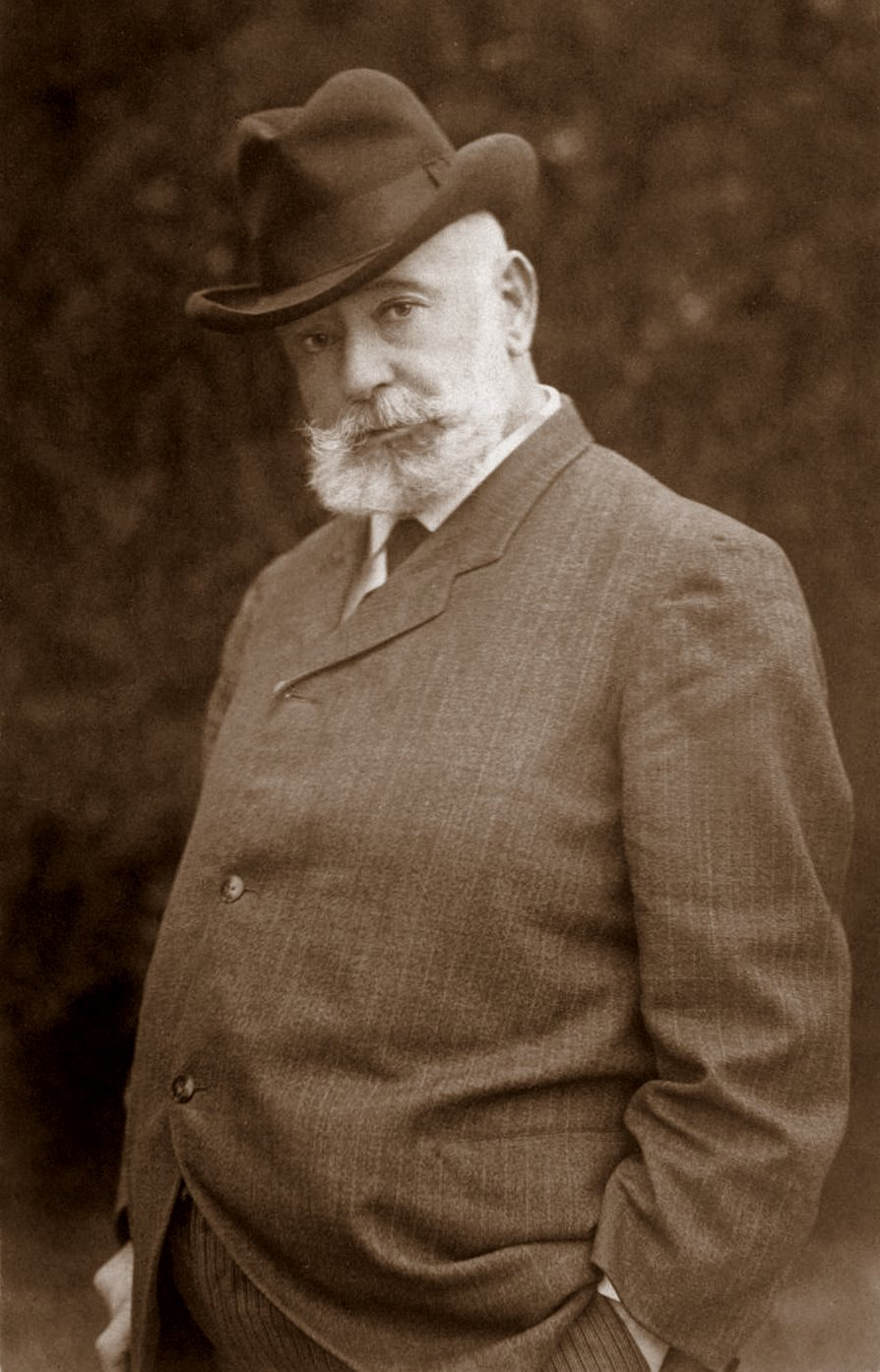
Stoddard

Gilmour

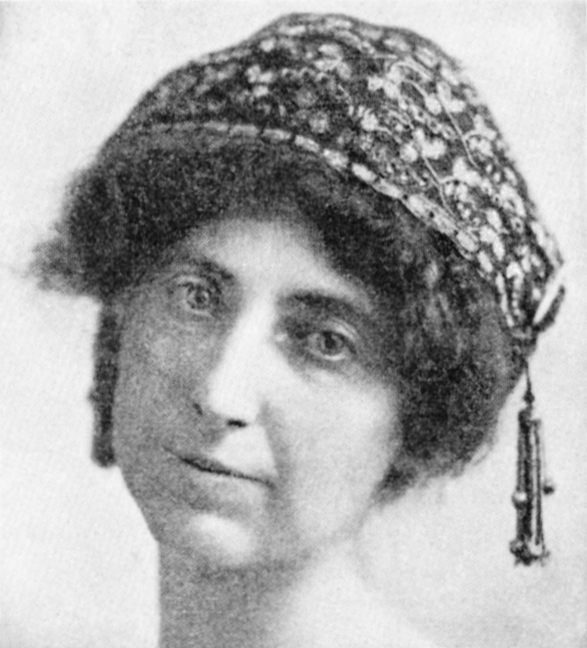
Armes

Having (he thought) ended his brief, secret marriage to Léonie Gilmour in the early months of 1904, Noguchi made plans to return to Japan and marry Ethel Armes. At this point, the Russo-Japanese War was in progress and Armes, now in Birmingham, Alabama had taken over as Noguchi's editor amid a greatly increased demand for Noguchi's articles on Japanese topics.

=== Return to Japan ===
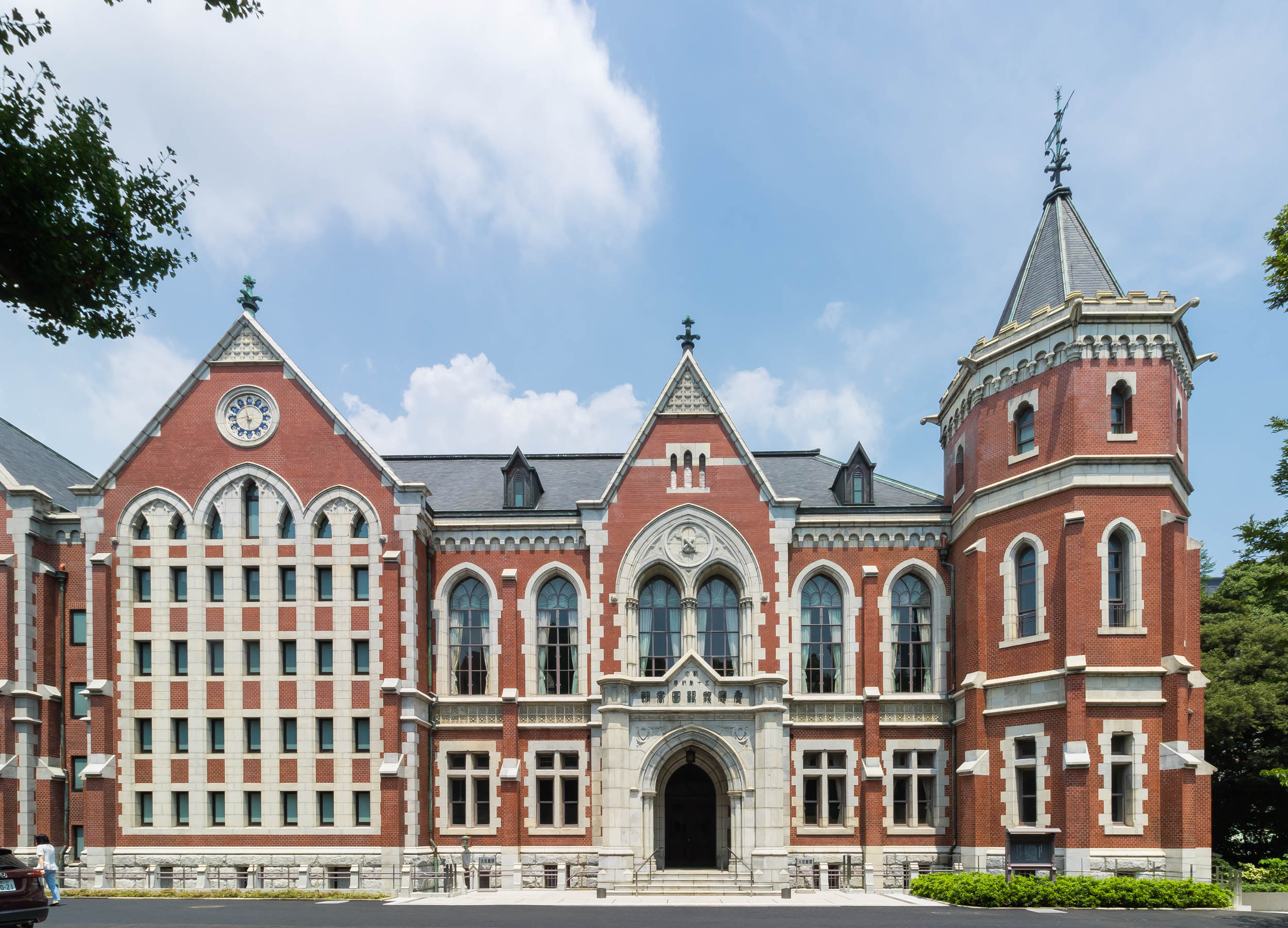
Keio University Library 1912.

Noguchi returned to Japan in August 1904, and became a professor of English at his alma mater Keio University the following year, but his marriage plans were spoiled when it became known that Léonie Gilmour had given birth to Noguchi's son (the future sculptor Isamu Noguchi) in Los Angeles. He moved to the Koishikawa neighborhood of Tokyo in November 1905, and published an anthology of prose poetry in English, The Summer Cloud, shortly thereafter.

From November 1906 to January 1908, Noguchi wrote a literary criticism column almost every week for the Japan Times, among the more notable of which was the November 3, 1907 "Mr. Yeats and the No," advising William Butler Yeats to study the Noh drama. "He has been attempting to reform and strengthen the Western stage through his own little plays which are built on Irish legend or history; and so far, in his own way, he is successful. I feel happy to think that he would find his own ideal in our No performance, if he should see and study it." After studying Ernest Fenollosa's Noh translations with Ezra Pound, Yeats staged his first Noh-style play, At the Hawk's Well, in 1916, eliciting Noguchi's approval in another Japan Times column. Noguchi also published the first volume of English kyōgen translations, Ten Kiogen in English in 1907, but few copies sold. He later produced numerous Noh translations and attempted to publish a volume of Ten Noh Plays.

In 1907, Léonie and Isamu joined Noguchi in Tokyo, but the reunion proved short-lived, mainly because Noguchi had already married a Japanese woman, Matsu Takeda, before their arrival. He and Léonie separated for good in 1910, although Léonie and Isamu continued to live in Japan.

Noguchi continued to publish extensively in English after his return to Japan, becoming a leading interpreter of Japanese culture to Westerners, and of Western culture to the Japanese. His 1909 poem collection, The Pilgrimage, was widely admired, as was a 1913 collection of essays, Through the Torii.

=== Lectures abroad ===
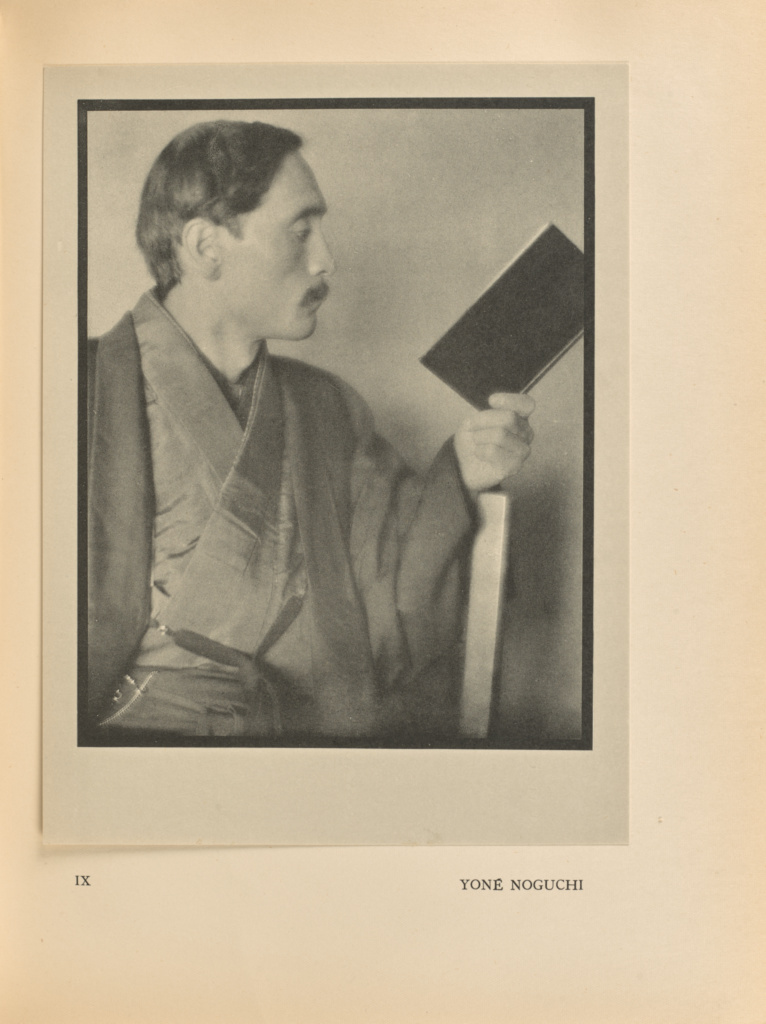
Noguchi photographed by Alvin Langdon Coburn, 1913

In 1913, he made his second trip to Britain (via Marseille and Paris) to lecture on Japanese poetry at Magdalen College, Oxford at the invitation of poet laureate, Robert Bridges, also giving lectures to the Japan Society of London and reading at the Poetry Bookshop. While in London, he met with George Bernard Shaw, W. B. Yeats, Ezra Pound, Laurence Binyon, Arthur Symons, Sarojini Naidu, and numerous other noted literary figures, and also investigated the latest trends in British modern art, spending time with Roger Fry, Alvin Langdon Coburn, Joseph Pennell, Jacob Epstein and Henri Gaudier-Brzeska. In April the following year, while in Paris, he also met with Tōson Shimazaki who happened to be travelling in Europe at the time. Noguchi traveled back to Japan via Berlin and Moscow using the Trans-Siberian Railway.

A collection of literary essays, Through the Torii had appeared at the time of Noguchi's arrival in Britain, and while there, he arranged the publication of The Spirit of Japanese Poetry, The Spirit of Japanese Art and The Story of Yone Noguchi.

In 1919–20, Noguchi made a transcontinental lecture tour of America under the aegis of the James B. Pond Lyceum Bureau, speaking at Stanford University, the University of California at Berkeley, the University of Chicago and the University of Utah, and the University of Toronto, among other places.

=== Japanese poet and art critic ===
After the publication of a collection of short poems entitled Japanese Hokkus in 1920, Noguchi devoted most of his English efforts to studies of ukiyo-e and began a belated career as a Japanese language poet. Noguchi's success as a Japanese poet has been questioned by Japanese scholars; Norimasa Morita states that Noguchi "struggled to make a literary reputation for himself in Japan" and that "most of his Japanese poems received no critical or popular recognition". Other scholars including Madoka Hori point to evidence of Noguchi's success such as the May 1926 Noguchi Yonejiro special number of the magazine Nippon Shijin (The Japanese Poet).

Noguchi's extensive art-historical writings produced similarly divergent reactions. A book like The Ukiyoye Primitives (1933) could delight poet and editor Marianne Moore with its "renovated language of unimpaired connotation" while severely testing the patience of Harvard art historian Benjamin Rowland, Jr., by its unfamiliar "manipulation of the language" that "frequently obscures the meaning of whole passages." Moore thought the book "useful to the judge of prints"; not Rowland, who complained that its aesthetic judgments "tend toward the sentimental and are for the most part so superficial as to be of practically no value." Even Rowland, though, had to commend what he thought "undoubtedly the finest reproductions in any work on Ukiyo-ye that has yet appeared in English."

All of Noguchi's later books, in both Japanese and English, were published in Japan, for Noguchi encountered stiff resistance from American and British publishers in the 1930s, despite the support of a few sympathetic editors like Moore and R. A. Scott-James.

=== The war years ===
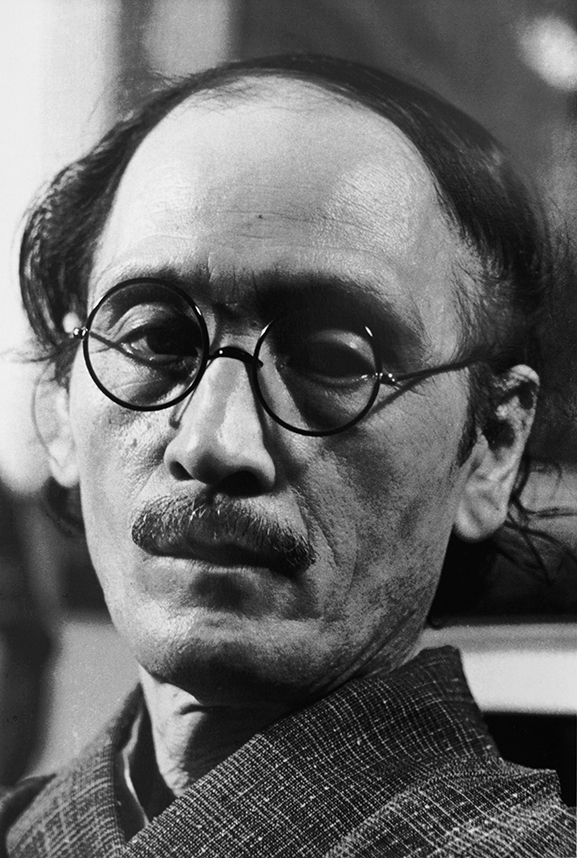
Noguchi by Ihei Kimura

Noguchi's politics tended to follow prevailing Japanese tendencies. In the 1920s, following the leftist turn of Taishō democracy, he published in leftist magazines like Kaizō, but by the 1930s, he had followed the country's turn to the right. Partly as a result of his friendship with leading Indian intellectuals like Rabindranath Tagore and Sarojini Naidu, Noguchi was sent to India in 1935–36 to help gain support for Japanese objectives in East Asia, but he had limited success. Noguchi and Tagore had a bitter exchange of letters in 1938 before their friendship ended over political and philosophical differences. During the Second World War, Noguchi supported the Japanese cause, advocating a no-holds-barred assault on the Western countries he had once admired.

=== Postwar period ===
In April 1945, his house in Nakano, Tokyo was destroyed in the American Bombing of Tokyo. After the war, he succeeded in reconciling with his estranged son Isamu before dying of stomach cancer on July 13, 1947.

== Critical evaluations ==
Critical evaluations of Noguchi, while varying drastically, have frequently stressed the enigmatic character of his work. Arthur Symons referred to him as a "scarcely to be apprehended personality." Arthur Ransome called him "a poet whose poems are so separate that a hundred of them do not suffice for his expression." Ezra Pound, on first reading The Pilgrimage in 1911 wrote that "His poems seem to be rather beautiful. I don't quite know what to think about them." Nishiwaki Junzaburō wrote, "Most of his earlier poems have always seemed to me so terrific, so bewildering, as to startle me out of reason or system."

Noguchi was hailed in the pages of Poetry as a pioneering modernist, thanks to his early advocacy of free verse and association with modernist writers like Yeats, Ezra Pound, Richard Aldington, and John Gould Fletcher.

Noguchi may be considered a cross-cultural, transnational, or cosmopolitan writer. His work may also be considered, albeit somewhat more problematically, within the national literatures of Japan and the United States (see Japanese literature, American literature). Noguchi has recently gained attention in Asian American studies due to the increasing interest in transnationalism.

Yone Noguchi is played by Nakamura Shidō II in the film Leonie (2010).

== Books in English by Yone Noguchi ==
- Seen & Unseen, or, Monologues of a Homeless Snail (1897, 1920)
- The Voice of the Valley (1897)
- The American Diary of a Japanese Girl (1902, 1904, 1912, 2007)
- From the Eastern Sea (pamphlet) (1903)
- From the Eastern Sea (1903, 1903, 1905, 1910)
- The American Letters of a Japanese Parlor Maid (1905)
- Japan of Sword and Love (1905)
- The Summer Cloud (1906)
- Ten Kiogen in English (1907)
- The Pilgrimage (1909, 1912)
- Kamakura (1910)
- Lafcadio Hearn in Japan (1910, 1911)
- The Spirit of Japanese Poetry (1914)
- The Story of Yone Noguchi (1914, 1915)
- Through the Torii (1914, 1922)
- The Spirit of Japanese Art (1915)
- Japanese Hokkus (1920)
- Japan and America (1921)
- Hiroshige (1921)
- Selected Poems of Yone Noguchi (1921)
- Korin (1922)
- Utamaro (1924)
- Hokusai (1925)
- Harunobu (1927)
- Sharaku (1932)
- The Ukiyoye Primitives (1933)
- Hiroshige (1934)
- Hiroshige and Japanese Landscapes (1934)
- The Ganges Calls Me (1938)
- Harunobu (1940)
- Hiroshige (1940)
- Emperor Shomu and the Shosoin (1941).
- Collected English Letters, ed. Ikuko Atsumi (1975).
- Selected English Writings of Yone Noguchi: An East-West Literary Assimilation, ed. Yoshinobu Hakutani, 2 v. (1990–1992).
- Collected English Works of Yone Noguchi: Poems, Novels and Literary Essays, ed. Shunsuke Kamei, 6 v. (2007)
  - ヨネ・ノグチ(野口米次郎)英文著作集 ～文芸作品・評論・詩集～
- Later Essays, ed. Edward Marx (2013).

== Contributions to periodicals ==
Noguchi contributed to numerous periodicals in the United States, Japan, England, and India, including: The Academy, Asahi Shimbun, Blackwood's, The Bookman, The Bookman, The Boston Transcript, The Brooklyn Eagle, The Calcutta Review, The Chap-Book, Chūōkōron, The Conservator, The Dallas Morning News, The Detroit Free Press, The Dial, The Double Dealer, The Egoist, The Graphic, The Japan Times, Kaizō, The Lark, Frank Leslie's Popular Monthly, London Mercury, Los Angeles Times, Mainichi Shinbun, Mita Bungaku, The Modern Review, Myōjō, The Nation (London), The Nation (New York), The New Orleans Times-Democrat, The New York Globe, The New York Sun, The New York Times, The New-York Tribune, The Philistine, Poetry Magazine, Poet Lore, The Poetry Review, The Reader Magazine, San Francisco Chronicle, St. Paul Globe, Sunset Magazine, T'ien Hsia Monthly, T.P.'s Weekly, Taiyō, Teikoku Bungaku, The Visva-Bharati Quarterly, The Washington Post, The Westminster Gazette, and Yomiuri Shimbun.
