= Workers Dance League =

American dance organization (1932–1935)

The Workers Dance League (WDL) was founded in 1932 in New York City during the Great Depression. Created by young modern dancers, WDL used dance as a form of social protest to address class struggle and workers' rights. It recruited workers as participants and audiences and brought dance to union halls, political rallies, and public demonstrations to raise awareness.

== Background ==
American poet Edith Segal began using dance as a means of expression and protest as early as the 1920s, performing works that celebrated leaders of the socialist movement. In 1924, she performed a memorial solo at the Lenin Memorial Meeting in Chicago's Ashland Stadium, a piece that began solemnly but shifted to celebrate Lenin's legacy and the continued fight against capitalist oppression.

Segal's early formation of The Red Dancers in 1928 laid the groundwork for the Workers Dance League and led to collaborations with other leftist performance groups. The Red Dancers were soon followed by the formation of other workers' dance groups. By 1932, eleven workers' groups had been formed in the New York City area. The Workers Dance League was created after a mass dance celebrating May Day. With the Harlem Dance Group, Anna Sokolow led the Dance Unit, and Segal led the Needle Trades Industrial Workers Union (N.T.I.W.U.) Dance Group and the Furriers Dance Group, bringing dance directly into union halls and working-class communities.

Inspired by Marxist ideals, the WDL encouraged dance as a tool for social change and class consciousness. The group was part of a larger revolutionary movement that emerged in response to the 1929 stock market crash and the inequalities amplified by the Depression.

== Artistic influence ==
The League comprised two primary dance styles: modern dance, led by choreographers like Anna Sokolow, Jane Dudley, and Sophie Maslow, and agit-prop dance, which used a more direct, propagandist style performed by recreational groups linked to unions. The WDL's performances were accessible, using stages in union halls and spaces associated with worker organizations.

WDL members incorporated techniques from prominent modern dance figures, including Martha Graham, Hanya Holm, Doris Humphrey, and Charles Weidman, emphasizing movement as a means of expression rather than an elite, aesthetic pursuit. The WDL combined technical dance training with working-class themes, reflecting everyday struggles in choreography and often using mundane activities as the basis for dance material.

WDL members performed for the general public, including at John Martin's evenings of dance at the New School for Social Research in 1934. Other choreographers and notable dancers include: Helen Tamiris, Sophie Maslow, Jane Dudley, Anna Sokolow.

== Development ==
In 1935, the WDL organized under "Unite Against War and Fascism," and renamed themselves the New Dance League, shifting focus toward broader themes, including the Spanish Civil War and the global rise of fascism. Though not officially affiliated with the Communist Party, the WDL had strong left-wing influences, underscored by support from the Workers' Laboratory Theatre.

The Workers Dance League remains significant as one of the first American dance organizations to bridge art and activism, setting a precedent for socially conscious dance that persists in modern American choreography.
