= Partington (surname) =

Notable people with the surname Partington include:

- Adrian Partington (born 1958), English conductor, chorus master, organist and pianist
- Bill Partington (born 1968), American politician and attorney
- Blanche Partington (1866–1951), American journalist
- Brian Partington (born 1936), British Anglican priest, formerly Archdeacon of Sodor and Man
- Brose Partington (born 1979), American sculptor
- Charles Frederick Partington (died 1857?), British science lecturer and writer
- Edward Partington, 1st Baron Doverdale (1836–1925), English industrialist
- Gertrude Partington (1874–1959), British-born American painter better known as Gertrude Partington Albright
- Genevieve Partington, a human rights activist, feminist and director of Amnesty International Ghana
- James Edge Partington (1854–1930), British anthropologist
- James Riddick Partington (1886–1965), British chemist and historian of chemistry
- Joe Partington (born 1990), English football player
- John Herbert Evelyn Partington (1843-99), a member of the Manchester School of Painters
- Jonathan Partington (born 1955), English mathematician
- Josh Partington, member of American rock band Something Corporate
- Lucy Partington (1952–1973/4), British murder victim
- Marian Partington (born 1948), English writer
- Mary Partington (Shaker) (c. 1755–1833), one of the first American Shakers
- Mary Partington (1889–1979), retired schoolteacher and goat farmer who is best known for shooting and accidentally killing an intruder in her home in 1966 near Lincoln, Nebraska
- Oliver Partington (born 1998), English rugby league footballer
- Oswald Partington, 2nd Baron Doverdale (1872–1935), English politician
- Peter Partington (born 1939), politician in Ontario, Canada
- Phyllis Partington (1883–1933), American opera singer under the stage name Frances Peralta
- Ralph Partington (1806–1873), English-American Mormon pioneer
- Rex Partington (1924–2006), American actor, director and producer
- Sallie Partington (1834–1907), American Civil War era actress

== Fictional characters ==
- Mrs Partington, character created by American humorist Benjamin Penhallow Shillaber

== See also ==
- The Adventure of the Bruce-Partington Plans, Sherlock Holmes story
- Stephen Patrington (died 1417), English bishop
