= List of Americans of English descent =

This is a list of notable Americans of English descent, including both original immigrants who obtained American citizenship and their American descendants.

To be included in this list, the person must have a Wikipedia article showing they are English American or must have references showing they are English American and are notable.

== List ==
=== Visual artists ===
- Arthur Crooks
- Thomas Eakins
- Peter Harrison
- Childe Hassam
- Thomas Hope
- Grandma Moses
- William Nichols
- Norman Rockwell
- John Singer Sargent
- Thomas Sully
- Abbott Handerson Thayer
- John Trumbull
- Calvert Vaux
- Andrew Wyeth
- N.C. Wyeth

=== Assassins, outlaws, and criminals ===
- John Wilkes Booth – Abraham Lincoln assassin
- Lizzie Borden – central figure in the hatchet murders of her father and stepmother on August 4, 1892, in Fall River, Massachusetts
- Butch Cassidy – train and bank robber
- Albert Fish – famed child serial killer
- Jesse James – train and bank robber
- Richard Lawrence – intellectually disabled criminal, who attempted to kill Andrew Jackson
- William Poole – gangster, "Bill the Butcher", Know-Nothing politician

=== Astronauts ===
- Neil Armstrong – first person to step on the moon
- Christa McAuliffe – English, Irish, German and Lebanese ancestry
- Alan Shepard – first American to travel into space

=== Astronomers ===
- Harold D. Babcock
- Edgar Frisby
- Cecilia Payne-Gaposchkin
- Henrietta Swan Leavitt
- Percival Lowell

=== Directors, producers ===
- Robert Aldrich
- Robert Altman
- John Badham
- J. Stuart Blackton
- Charles Brabin
- George Howells Broadhurst
- Clint Eastwood
- Howard Hawks
- Fraser Clarke Heston
- Susan Fales-Hill
- Jack Hope
- David Horsley
- Ron Howard
- John Huston
- George Lucas
- Garry Marshall
- Christopher Nolan
- Jonathan Nolan
- Hassard Short
- Emma Thomas
- William A. Wellman

=== Descendants of Mayflower passengers ===
- Alec Baldwin
- Jordana Brewster – actress
- Chevy Chase – Emmy Award-winning comedian, writer, and television and film actor
- Bing Crosby – actor and singer
- Seth MacFarlane – actor, animator and writer; notable for creating Family Guy and American Dad
- Clint Eastwood – actor
- Nick Folk – football player
- Jodie Foster – actress
- Richard Gere – actor
- Martha Graham – dancer
- Ulysses S. Grant – Union Army general; U.S. President
- Hugh Hefner – founder, majority owner, editor-in-chief, and Chief Creative Officer of Playboy Enterprises
- Susan Fales-Hill
- Ashley Judd – actress
- John Lithgow – actor
- Christopher Lloyd – actor
- Henry Wadsworth Longfellow – poet
- George B. McClellan – Union Army general
- Marilyn Monroe – actress
- Anna Mary Robertson Moses
- Anthony Perkins – actor
- Anne Ramsey – actress
- Christopher Reeve – actor
- Bill Richardson – Governor of New Mexico
- Franklin D. Roosevelt – U.S. President
- Victoria Rowell – actress
- Benjamin Spock – pediatrician and author, Baby and Child Care
- Dick Van Dyke –
- Noah Webster – American lexicographer, textbook author, spelling reformer, political writer, word enthusiast, and editor

=== Actors ===
==== A ====
- Odessa Adlon
- Ben Affleck
- Casey Affleck
- Jessica Alba
- Karen Allen
- Lauren Ambrose
- Gillian Anderson
- Devon Aoki
- Hayley Atwell
- Jean Arthur
- Jake T. Austin

==== B ====
- Brandon Baker
- Alec Baldwin
- Daniel Baldwin
- Stephen Baldwin
- William Baldwin
- Mark Ballas
- Fred Ball
- Lucille Ball
- Jamie Bamber
- Ethel Barrymore
- Drew Barrymore
- Maurice Barrymore
- Mischa Barton
- Kim Basinger
- Emily Beecham
- Laura Joyce Bell
- Tobin Bell
- Annette Bening
- Emily Bergl
- Halle Berry
- Valerie Bertinelli
- Michael Biehn
- Jessica Biel
- Jason Biggs
- Bill Bixby
- Jack Black
- JB Blanc
- Rowan Blanchard
- Alexis Bledel
- Violetta Blue
- Emily Blunt
- Humphrey Bogart
- Matt Bomer
- Lucy Boynton
- Millie Bobby Brown
- Elizabeth Bracco
- Lorraine Bracco
- Zach Braff
- Vanessa Branch
- Marlon Brando
- Amy Brenneman
- Jordana Brewster
- Dorothy Bridges
- James Broderick
- Matthew Broderick
- Ty Burrell

==== C ====
- Anna Camp
- Nicolas Cage
- Matt Cedeño
- John Cena
- Lon Chaney Sr.
- Lon Chaney Jr.
- Charles Chaplin Jr.
- Geraldine Chaplin
- Josephine Chaplin
- Kiera Chaplin
- Michael Chaplin
- Sydney Earle Chaplin
- Victoria Chaplin
- Ruth Chatterton
- Chevy Chase
- Montgomery Clift
- George Clooney
- Lauren Cohan
- Stephen Colbert
- Jack Coleman
- Lily Collins
- Constance Collier
- Gary Cooper
- Sofia Coppola
- James Corden
- Miranda Cosgrove
- Kevin Costner
- Caylee Cowan
- Courteney Cox
- Edward Coxen
- Kaley Cuoco
- Daniel Craig
- James Cromwell
- Bing Crosby
- David Cross
- Marcia Cross
- Tom Cruise
- Cameron Cuffe
- Tim Curry

==== D ====
- Alexandra Daddario
- Matt Damon
- Blythe Danner
- Ted Danson
- Fanny Davenport
- Harry Davenport
- Jaye Davidson
- Sarah Lynn Dawson
- James Dean
- Yvonne De Carlo
- Robert De Niro
- India de Beaufort
- Joe DeRita
- Johnny Depp
- Lily-Rose Depp
- Jenna Dewan
- Cameron Diaz
- Diana Douglas
- Melvyn Douglas
- Michael Douglas
- Lesley-Anne Down
- Robin Atkin Downes
- Minnie Driver
- Eliza Dushku
- Deanna Durbin
- Robert Duvall

==== E ====
- Alison Eastwood
- Clint Eastwood
- Kyle Eastwood
- Scott Eastwood
- Aaron Eckhart
- Jennifer Ehle
- Shannon Elizabeth
- June Elvidge
- Alice Eve

==== F ====
- Edie Falco
- Dakota Fanning
- Elle Fanning
- Farrah Fawcett
- Will Ferrell
- Tina Fey
- W.C. Fields
- Carrie Fisher
- Charles Fisher
- Sean Patrick Flanery
- Scott Foley
- Joan Fontaine
- Trent Ford
- Wallace Ford
- Robert Forster
- Jodie Foster
- Matthew Fox
- Jeff Foxworthy

==== G ====
- Ava Gardner
- Andrew Garfield
- Judy Garland
- Greer Garson
- Sarah Michelle Gellar
- Gladys George
- Richard Gere
- Leila George
- Malcolm Gets
- Lily Gladstone
- Crispin Glover
- John Goodman
- Gale Gordon
- Burn Gorman
- YaYa Gosselin
- Milena Govich
- Betty Grable
- Gloria Grahame
- Cary Grant
- Melanie Griffith
- Christopher Guest
- Carla Gugino
- Mamie Gummer
- Ryan Guzman
- Fred Gwynne
- Jake Gyllenhaal
- Maggie Gyllenhaal

==== H ====
- Gene Hackman
- Bill Hader
- Rebecca Hall
- Mark Hamill
- Linda Hamilton
- Jon Hamm
- Linda Harrison
- David Hasselhoff
- Teri Hatcher
- Olivia de Havilland
- Jonah Hauer-King
- Goldie Hawn
- Richard Haydn
- Rita Hayworth
- Emma Heming
- Christina Hendricks
- Charlton Heston
- Catherine Hicks
- Paris Hilton
- William Holden
- Bob Hope
- John Houseman
- Kelly Hu
- Vanessa Hudgens
- Kate Hudson
- Oliver Hudson
- Rock Hudson
- Felicity Huffman
- Helen Hunt
- Damian Hurley
- Anjelica Huston
- Danny Huston
- Jack Huston
- John Huston

==== I-J ====
- Caitlyn Jenner
- Kendall Jenner
- Kris Jenner
- Kylie Jenner
- Glynis Johns
- Victoria Justice

==== K ====
- Matthew Kane
- Khloé Kardashian
- Kim Kardashian
- Kourtney Kardashian
- Rob Kardashian
- Zoe Kazan
- Michael Keaton
- Ellie Kemper
- Anna Kendrick
- George Kennedy
- Riley Keough
- John Kerr
- Nicole Kidman
- Justin Kirk
- Jen Kirkman
- Hayley Kiyoko
- Chris Klein
- David Koechner

==== L ====
- Alan Ladd
- Alan Ladd Jr.
- David Ladd
- Jordan Ladd
- Sanoe Lake
- Burt Lancaster
- Lillie Langtry
- Angela Lansbury
- Brandon Lee
- Shannon Lee
- Peyton Elizabeth Lee
- Jane Leeves
- Téa Leoni
- Juliette Lewis
- Christopher Lloyd
- Sam Lloyd
- June Lockhart
- Chad Lowe
- Rob Lowe
- Camilla Luddington

==== M ====
- Seth MacFarlane
- Roma Maffia
- Wendie Malick
- John Malkovich
- Jayne Mansfield
- Romy Mars
- Penny Marshall
- Lee Marvin
- Burgess Meredith
- Sienna Miller
- Wentworth Miller
- Marilyn Monroe
- Frank Morgan
- Lindsey Morgan
- Ralph Morgan
- Meg Mundy
- Olivia Munn
- Edward R. Murrow

==== N-O ====
- Becki Newton
- Matt Newton
- Jack Nicholson
- Lorraine Nicholson
- Edward Norton
- Dylan O'Brien
- John Oliver
- Timothy Olyphant
- Ryan O'Neal
- Tatum O'Neal
- Chord Overstreet
- Jessica Oyelowo

==== P-Q ====
- Gwyneth Paltrow
- Sarah Jessica Parker
- Audrina Patridge
- Sara Paxton
- Gregory Peck
- William Peltz
- Nia Peeples
- Chelsea Peretti
- Joaquin Phoenix
- River Phoenix
- Mary Pickford
- Christina Pickles
- Justin Pierce
- Aubrey Plaza
- Amy Poehler
- Ellen Pompeo
- Ryan Potter
- Tyrone Power
- Lisa Marie Presley
- Priscilla Presley
- Freddie Prinze Jr.
- Malia Pyles
- Margaret Qualley
- Dennis Quaid
- Randy Quaid

==== R ====
- Monica Raymund
- Adam Rayner
- Robert Redford
- Keanu Reeves
- Tara Reid
- Tracy Reiner
- James Remar
- Lee Remick
- Burt Reynolds
- Debbie Reynolds
- Blanche Ring
- Krysten Ritter
- Jason Robards
- AnnaSophia Robb
- Emma Roberts
- Eric Roberts
- Julia Roberts
- James Roday
- Rebecca Romijn
- Neil Ross
- Emmy Rossum
- Brandon Routh
- Victoria Rowell
- Paul Rudd
- Kurt Russell
- Wyatt Russell
- Amy Ryan

==== S ====
- Susan Sarandon
- Edie Sedgwick
- Kyra Sedgwick
- Robert Sedgwick
- Marian Seldes
- Tom Selleck
- Amanda Seyfried
- Nicollette Sheridan
- Brooke Shields
- Kiernan Shipka
- Andrew Shue
- Elisabeth Shue
- Casey Siemaszko
- Nina Siemaszko
- Molly Sims
- Guy Siner
- Alicia Silverstone
- Douglas Smith
- Gregory Smith
- Jaclyn Smith
- Britney Spears
- Jamie Lynn Spears
- Kim Stanley
- Karen Steele
- Julia Stiles
- Emma Stone
- Beatrice Straight
- Meryl Streep
- Gregg Sulkin
- Patrick Swayze
- Victoria Summer

==== T ====
- William Talman
- Jessica Tandy
- Justin Timberlake
- Ashley Tisdale
- Miles Teller
- Georgia Tennant
- Shirley Temple
- Elizabeth Taylor
- Marsha Thomason
- Connor Tomlinson
- Sonny Tufts
- Lana Turner
- Liv Tyler

==== U-V ====
- Tracey Ullman
- Erik Valdez
- Casper Van Dien
- Grace Van Dien
- Dick Van Dyke
- Jerry Van Dyke
- Vince Vaughn
- Danielle Vega
- Milo Ventimiglia
- Dita Von Teese

==== W-Z ====
- Natasha Gregson Wagner
- Donnie Wahlberg
- Mark Wahlberg
- Robert Wahlberg
- Paul Walker
- Evelyn Ward
- Kerry Washington
- Katherine Waterston
- Sam Waterston
- John Wayne
- Dennis Weaver
- Sigourney Weaver
- Sylvester Weaver
- Raquel Welch
- Betty White
- Kristen Wiig
- Olivia Wilde
- Barry Williams
- Chris Williams (actor)
- Vanessa Williams
- Philip Winchester
- Jonathan Winters
- Elijah Wood
- Fay Wray
- John Lloyd Young

=== Authors and writers ===
- Louisa May Alcott
- Amelia Edith Huddleston Barr
- John Bartlett
- L. Frank Baum
- Ambrose Bierce
- Tony Blankley
- Victor Bockris
- Mary Louise Booth
- William Cullen Bryant
- Edgar Rice Burroughs
- William S. Burroughs
- Linda Lee Cadwell
- Carolyn Cassady
- Raymond Chandler
- J. Smeaton Chase
- Chris Claremont
- James Fenimore Cooper
- Stephen Crane
- Ann Coulter
- Coningsby Dawson
- John Derbyshire
- Emily Dickinson
- T.S. Eliot
- Ralph Waldo Emerson
- William Faulkner
- Diana Gabaldon
- Joseph Gales
- Zane Grey
- Edgar Guest
- Ernest Hemingway
- Nathaniel Hawthorne
- Bret Harte
- Thomas S. Hinde
- Christopher Hitchens
- Oliver Wendell Holmes Sr.
- Washington Irving
- Agnes Newton Keith
- Sidney Lanier
- Estelle Anna Lewis
- Jack London
- Henry Wadsworth Longfellow
- Robert Lowell
- William Least Heat-Moon
- Thomas Paine
- Thomas Nelson Page
- William Luther Pierce
- Edgar Allan Poe
- William Henry Leonard Poe
- Katherine Anne Porter
- Ezra Pound
- Thomas Pynchon
- James Wesley Rawles
- E. E. Smith
- Nicholas Sparks
- Lynne Spears
- John Steinbeck
- Charles Warren Stoddard
- Glendon Swarthout
- Henry David Thoreau
- Mark Twain
- Noah Webster
- Laura Ingalls Wilder
- Tennessee Williams
- Michael Z. Williamson

=== Musicians ===
- Roy Acuff
- Ronnie van Zant
- Alex Gaskarth
- Elijah Blue Allman
- Joan Baez
- Mark Ballas
- Victoria Beckham
- Josh Beech
- Rebecca Black
- Ella Bright
- Jack Brooks – lyricist
- Johnny Cash
- Rosanne Cash
- Cher
- Kelly Clarkson
- Kurt Cobain
- David Cook
- Kristinia DeBarge
- MF Doom
- Spencer Dryden
- Fergie
- Dave Grohl
- Kirk Hammett
- Albert Hammond Jr
- James Hetfield
- Buddy Holly
- Dana Key
- Anthony Kiedis
- Kris Kristofferson
- Jenny Lee Lindberg
- Greg London
- Courtney Love
- Lene Lovich
- Tony Lucca
- Reba McEntire
- Charles Mingus
- Mandy Moore
- Jim Morrison
- Wayne Newton
- Stevie Nicks
- Hayley Orrantia
- Randy Owen
- Sara Paxton
- Katy Perry
- John Phillips
- Iggy Pop
- Romina Power
- Kevin Richardson
- Kevin Rudolf
- Buffy Sainte-Marie
- Slash
- Grace Slick
- Steven Tyler
- Eddie Vedder
- Summer Walker
- Florence Welch
- Hank Williams
- Brian Wilson
- Carnie Wilson
- Wendy Wilson
- Sid Wilson
- Kimberly Wyatt
- "Weird Al" Yankovic
- Trisha Yearwood

=== Entrepreneurs, executives ===
- P. T. Barnum
- Anthony Joseph Drexel Biddle Sr.
- Nicholas Biddle
- Benjamin Brewster
- Caleb Bradham – creator of Pepsi
- Henry Clews – financier
- William R. Coe – insurance company, railroad, and business executive, and philanthropist
- James Boorman Colgate – financier
- Samuel Colgate – manufacturer
- William Colgate – manufacturer who founded what became the Colgate toothpaste company
- Roy O. Disney
- Walt Disney
- John Francis Dodge – automobile manufacturing pioneer
- Bill Gates – co-founder of Microsoft and world's richest man for 13 consecutive years
- Edward Henry Harriman – railroad executive
- Charles T. Hayden
- Joseph Lowthian Hudson
- Samuel Insull – investor, known for purchasing utilities and railroads
- Will Keith Kellogg
- Phil Knight – co-founder of Nike
- Matthew Laflin
- Edward Lamb
- Charles M. Loring
- Anson Green Phelps – founded Phelps, Dodge & Co.
- Madeleine Pickens
- Henry Huttleston Rogers
- Samuel Slater – early American industrialist popularly known as the "Founder of the American Industrial Revolution"
- Charles Lewis Tiffany
- Ellis Wainwright
- Sam Walton – founder of the American retailer Wal-Mart
- Henry Wells – co-founder of the Wells Fargo & Company
- Meg Whitman
- Henry Melville Whitney

=== First Ladies of the United States ===
(in order by their husband's presidency)

- Martha Washington
- Abigail Smith Adams
- Martha Jefferson
- Dolley Madison
- Elizabeth Monroe
- Louisa Adams
- Letitia Tyler
- Edith Wilson
- Grace Coolidge
- Jackie Kennedy
- Lady Bird Johnson
- Nancy Reagan
- Barbara Bush
- Hillary Clinton
- Laura Bush
- Michelle Obama
- Jill Biden

=== Governors of states ===
- Greg Abbott – Texas
- Neil Abercrombie – Hawaii
- Samuel Adams – Massachusetts
- Nahum J. Bachelder – New Hampshire
- Charlie Baker – Massachusetts
- James Barbour – Virginia
- Frederick Bates – Missouri
- Gunning Bedford Sr. – Delaware
- William D. Bloxham – Florida
- Jan Brewer – Arizona
- Owen Brewster – Maine
- Paul Brigham – Vermont
- Bryant Butler Brooks – Wyoming
- John Brough – Ohio
- Morgan Bulkeley – Connecticut
- Jeb Bush – Florida
- Ezra Butler – Vermont
- Harry F. Byrd – Virginia
- Cyrus C. Carpenter – Iowa
- Michael Castle – Delaware
- Martin Chittenden – Vermont
- Thomas Chittenden – Vermont
- Joshua Clayton – Delaware
- Powell Clayton – Arkansas
- DeWitt Clinton – New York
- George Clinton – New York
- Nicholas Cooke – Rhode Island
- John Christopher Cutler – Utah
- Mitch Daniels – Indiana
- William Richardson Davie – North Carolina
- Wendy Davis – Texas
- Nelson Dewey – Wisconsin
- Edward H. East – Tennessee
- Samuel Elbert – Georgia
- Edward Everett – Massachusetts
- John Brown Francis – Rhode Island
- Elbridge Gerry – Massachusetts
- Frank R. Gooding – Idaho
- William Greene – Rhode Island
- Frederic T. Greenhalge – Massachusetts
- Matthew Griswold – Connecticut
- Button Gwinnett – Georgia
- Lyman Hall – Georgia
- Wade Hampton III – South Carolina
- George Handley – Georgia
- Clifford Hansen – Wyoming
- Benjamin Harrison V – Virginia
- Joseph Roswell Hawley – Connecticut
- David Hazzard – Delaware
- Patrick Henry – Virginia
- John Hoeven – North Dakota
- John Eager Howard – Maryland
- Mike Huckabee – Arkansas
- James Iredell Jr. – North Carolina
- James Jackson – Georgia
- Thomas Johnson – Maryland
- John Langdon – New Hampshire
- Blair Lee III – Maryland
- Fitzhugh Lee – Virginia
- Henry Lee III – Virginia
- Thomas Sim Lee – Maryland
- Lloyd Lowndes Jr. – Maryland
- George Madison – Kentucky
- Stevens T. Mason – Michigan
- Alexander McNutt – Mississippi
- William Dunn Moseley – Florida
- Wilson Cary Nicholas – Virginia
- Aaron Ogden – New Jersey
- Charles Smith Olden – New Jersey
- William Paca – Maryland
- John Page – Virginia
- Sarah Palin – Alaska
- William A. Palmer – Vermont
- David Paterson – New York
- Endicott Peabody – Massachusetts
- William Sanford Pennington – New Jersey
- John S. Phelps – Missouri
- Rick Perry – Texas
- Francis Wilkinson Pickens – South Carolina
- Benjamin Pierce – New Hampshire
- John S. Pillsbury – Minnesota
- Charles Pinckney – South Carolina
- William Plumer – New Hampshire
- Beverley Randolph – Virginia
- Edmund Randolph – Virginia
- Peyton Randolph – Virginia
- Thomas Mann Randolph Jr. – Virginia
- George Read – Delaware
- Bill Richardson – New Mexico
- Tom Ridge – Pennsylvania
- Charles Carnan Ridgely – Maryland
- Jim Risch – Idaho
- Wyndham Robertson – Virginia
- Caesar Rodney – Delaware
- Daniel Rogers – Delaware
- George W. Romney – Michigan
- Mitt Romney – Massachusetts
- William E. Russell – Massachusetts
- Edward Rutledge – South Carolina
- John Rutledge – South Carolina
- Leverett Saltonstall – Massachusetts
- William Scranton – Pennsylvania
- John Sevier – Tennessee
- William Spry – Utah
- Leland Stanford – California
- Charles C. Stratton – New Jersey
- Edward Tiffin – Ohio
- Samuel J. Tilden – New York
- Benjamin Tillman – South Carolina
- James Hoge Tyler – Virginia
- John Tyler Sr. – Virginia
- Robert S. Vessey – South Dakota
- Joseph Marshall Walker – Louisiana
- William Weld – Massachusetts
- Heber Manning Wells – Utah
- John Wereat – Georgia
- George P. Wetmore – Rhode Island
- James Withycombe – Oregon
- Oliver Wolcott – Connecticut
- Oliver Wolcott Jr. – Connecticut

=== Historical figures ===
- Daniel Boone – American pioneer and hunter whose frontier exploits made him one of the first folk heroes of the US
- John Brown – abolitionist
- Wyatt Earp – westerner: Gunfight at the O.K. Corral
- Samuel Fielden – socialist, anarchist, labor organizer
- Elizabeth Fones – Puritan settler
- Pat Garrett – best known for killing Billy the Kid
- Howard Hughes – aviator, industrialist, film producer and director, philanthropist, and one of the wealthiest people in the world
- Francis Scott Key – amateur poet who wrote the words to the United States' national anthem, "The Star-Spangled Banner"
- Rebecca Nurse – figure in the Salem witch trials
- Annie Oakley – sharpshooter
- John Proctor – English born victim of the Salem Witch Trials
- Rick Rescorla – a hero of September 11, 2001
- Betsy Ross – maker of the first American flag
- Joseph Smith – religious leader and founder of Mormonism
- J. D. Tippit – police officer killed by Lee Harvey Oswald
- Abigail Williams – accuser in the Salem witch trials

==== Mormon pioneers ====
- May Anderson
- Ebenezer Beesley
- William Bickerton
- Thomas Bullock
- George Careless
- William Clayton
- Joseph Fielding
- Ruth May Fox
- Emma Lee French
- George Goddard
- May Green Hinckley
- Henry Howell
- John Jaques
- Heber C. Kimball
- Charles Kingston
- Christopher Layton
- George Manwaring
- Abraham Marchant
- Peter Maughan
- L. John Nuttall
- Ralph Partington
- Charles W. Penrose
- George Reynolds
- Brigham Henry Roberts
- Charles Roscoe Savage
- Joseph F. Smith
- Mary Fielding Smith
- Edward Stevenson
- James E. Talmage
- Agnes Taylor
- John Taylor
- George Teasdale
- Edward Tullidge
- David King Udall
- Nellie Unthank
- George D. Watt
- Daniel H. Wells
- John Wells
- Emily H. Woodmansee

=== Inventors ===
- Charles Alderton
- Samuel Andrews
- Caleb Bradham
- Peter Cooper Hewitt
- William Crompton
- Thomas Edison
- King Camp Gillette
- Charles Goodyear
- William S. Harley
- Robert Hoe
- Christopher Jones
- Samuel Morse
- Elon Musk
- Eliphalet Remington
- Edward S. Renwick – father was James Renwick
- Elihu Thomson
- Jimmy Wales
- Eli Whitney
- Orville and Wilbur Wright
- Amos Whitney

=== Journalists ===
- Ambrose Bierce
- Peter Brimelow
- Ben Bradlee
- Ben Bradlee, Jr.
- Heather Brooke
- Tina Brown
- Charles Carleton Coffin
- Jane Cunningham Croly
- Charles Anderson Dana
- Benjamin Edes
- Ronald Hilton
- David Ignatius
- Laura Ingraham
- Rachel Maddow
- Chris Matthews
- Edward R. Murrow
- Diane Sawyer
- Paul W. Smith
- Ida M. Tarbell
- Barbara Walters

=== Military ===
- Ethan Allen
- Benedict Arnold
- Henry H. Arnold
- Edward Dickinson Baker
- Thomas W. Bradley
- Braxton Bragg
- John C. Breckinridge
- Jacob Brown
- John Buford
- Matthew Butler
- George Rogers Clark
- Wesley Clark
- Norvell P. Cobb
- George A. Cobham Jr.
- Boston Corbett – Union Army soldier who shot and killed Abraham Lincoln's assassin, John Wilkes Booth
- Horatio Gates
- Edmund P. Gaines
- Horatio Gates
- Nathanael Greene
- William Halsey, Jr
- Cyrus Hamlin
- Wade Hampton III
- Winfield Scott Hancock
- Henry Heth
- Joseph Hooker
- Esek Hopkins
- Henry L. Hulbert
- Samuel Huntington
- Stonewall Jackson
- Joseph E. Johnston
- Charles Lee
- Edwin Gray Lee
- Robert E. Lee
- Samuel Phillips Lee
- James Longstreet
- James Murray Mason
- George B. McClellan
- James F. Merton
- Robert Olds
- Robin Olds
- George S. Patton
- Matthew C. Perry
- Noah Phelps
- George Pickett
- George W. Randolph
- Deborah Sampson
- Robert F. Stockton
- Richard Taylor
- William B. Travis
- Edward Trenchard
- Ronald R. Van Stockum
- Vernon A. Walters
- Abraham Whipple
- John Ancrum Winslow

=== Models ===
- Angela Bowie
- Cindy Crawford
- Kaia Gerber
- Jerry Hall
- Brook Lee
- Alyssa Miller
- Emily Ratajkowski
- Alexandra Richards
- Nia Sanchez
- Kimberly Stewart
- Kendra Wilkinson

=== Political figures ===
- Dean Acheson
- Nancy Astor, Viscountess Astor
- Thomas Bainbridge
- Michael Bennet
- George P. Bush
- George W. Bush
- George H. W. Bush
- Richard Girnt Butler
- Jimmy Carter
- John Caven
- Walter Chiles
- Hillary Clinton
- Susan Collins
- Calvin Coolidge
- Chris Coons
- Jefferson Davis
- Charles E. Dudley
- William M. Evarts
- Gerald Ford
- Benjamin Franklin
- Joseph Gales Sr.
- Lindsey Graham
- Warren G. Harding
- Herbert Hoover
- William Jennings
- Boris Johnson
- Lyndon B. Johnson
- R. Phillip Haire
- Richard Henry Lee
- Robert Liddell
- George Mason
- Mitch McConnell
- Catherine Mulholland
- Malcolm Nichols
- Richard Nixon
- Barack Obama
- Sarah Palin
- Henry Paulson
- Ronald Reagan
- Condoleezza Rice
- Jim Risch
- George Lincoln Rockwell
- Mitt Romney
- Franklin D. Roosevelt
- Edward Shippen
- George Sutherland
- Jon Tester
- John Townsend
- Harry S. Truman
- Elizabeth Warren
- Martin H. Weight
- Caspar Weinberger – former U.S. Secretary of Defense
- Harry Weeks – political activist and economist
- Woodrow Wilson

=== Presidents of the United States ===
A number of the presidents of the United States have English ancestry. The extent of English ancestry varies in the presidents with earlier presidents being predominantly of colonial English Yankee stock. Later U.S. presidents ancestry can often be traced to ancestors from multiple nations in Europe, including England.

George Washington (English)
1st President 1789–97 (great-grandfather, John Washington from Purleigh, Essex, England)
John Adams (English)
2nd President 1797–1801 (great-great-grandfather, Henry Adams, born 1583, Barton St David, Somerset, England, immigrated to Boston, Massachusetts)
Thomas Jefferson (English)
3rd President 1801–1809 (maternal English ancestry from William Randolph)
James Madison (English)
4th President 1809–17
John Quincy Adams (English)
6th President 1825–29 (Henry Adams born 1583 Barton St David, Somerset, England)
William Henry Harrison (English)
9th President 1841–1841
John Tyler (English)
10th President 1841–1845
Zachary Taylor (English)
12th President 1849–50
Millard Fillmore (English)
13th President 1850–1853
Franklin Pierce (English)
14th President 1853–1857
Abraham Lincoln (English and Welsh)
16th President 1861–65 (Samuel Lincoln baptised 1622 in Hingham, Norfolk, England, died in Hingham, Massachusetts).
Andrew Johnson (Scotch-Irish and English)
17th President 1865–1869
Ulysses S. Grant (Scotch-Irish, Scottish, and English)
18th President 1869–77
Rutherford Hayes (English)
19th President 1877–1881
James A. Garfield (English and French)
20th President 1881–81
Chester A. Arthur (Scotch-Irish and English)
21st President 1881–85
Grover Cleveland (Scotch-Irish and English)
22nd and 24th President 1885–89, 1893–97
Benjamin Harrison (Scotch-Irish and English)
23rd President 1889–93
William McKinley (Scotch-Irish, English and German)
25th President 1897–1901
Theodore Roosevelt (Dutch, Scottish, English and Scotch-Irish)
26th President 1901–1909
William Howard Taft (English)
27th President 1909–1913
Warren G. Harding (English, Scottish, Dutch and Welsh)
29th President 1921–23
Calvin Coolidge (English)
30th President 1923–1929
Herbert Hoover (German, Swiss, Scots-Irish, English)
31st President 1929–1933
Franklin D. Roosevelt (English, Dutch and Scottish)
32nd President 1933–45
Harry S Truman (Scotch-Irish, English and German)
33rd President 1945–53
Lyndon B. Johnson (English, Scotch-Irish and German)
36th President 1963–69
Richard Nixon (English and Scotch-Irish)
37th President 1969–74
Gerald Ford (English)
38th President 1974–77
Jimmy Carter (Scotch-Irish and English)
39th President 1977–81 (Thomas Carter Sr. emigrated from England to Isle of Wight County, Virginia)
Ronald Reagan (Scotch-Irish, Irish, English & Scottish)
40th President 1981–1989
George H. W. Bush (Scotch-Irish and English)
41st President 1989–93
Bill Clinton (Scotch-Irish and English)
42nd President 1993–2001
George W. Bush (Scotch-Irish and English)
43rd President 2001–2009 (Reynold Bush from Messing, Essex, England emigrated in 1631 to Cambridge, Massachusetts)
Barack Obama (Luo, English)
44th President 2009–2017 (his mother Ann Dunham's heritage is mostly English)
Joe Biden (Irish, French, and English)
46th President 2021-2025 (William Biden from Sussex, England emigrated before 1822 to Baltimore, Maryland)

=== Vice presidents of the United States ===
- John Adams
- Thomas Jefferson
- Aaron Burr
- Elbridge Gerry
- Daniel D. Tompkins
- John Tyler
- Millard Fillmore
- John C. Breckinridge
- Hannibal Hamlin
- William Wheeler
- Levi P. Morton
- Theodore Roosevelt
- James S. Sherman
- Calvin Coolidge
- Charles G. Dawes
- Charles Curtis
- John Nance Garner
- Henry A. Wallace
- Alben W. Barkley
- Richard Nixon
- Lyndon B. Johnson
- Gerald Ford
- Nelson Rockefeller
- George H. W. Bush
- Dan Quayle
- Al Gore
- Dick Cheney
- Joe Biden

=== Religious figures ===
- Costen Jordan Harrell
- Anne Hutchinson
- Eben Samuel Johnson
- Joseph R. N. Maxwell
- St. John O'Sullivan
- Charles W. Penrose
- Anna Howard Shaw
- George Teasdale
- Edward Thomson
- Ellen G. White
- John R. Winder

=== U.S. representatives ===
- Philip P. Barbour – Virginia
- Arthur Laban Bates – Pennsylvania
- Brian Baird – Washington
- William Bingham – Pennsylvania
- Clifton R. Breckinridge – Arkansas
- James Frankland Briggs – New Hampshire
- Thomas Patterson Brockman – South Carolina
- William Jennings Bryan – Nebraska
- Charles Frederick Crisp – Georgia
- Davy Crockett – Tennessee
- Franklin Davenport – New Jersey
- Wendy Davis Schuler – Wyoming
- George Dent – Maryland
- Samuel Dibble – South Carolina
- Stephen A. Douglas – Illinois
- Newt Gingrich – Georgia
- Ernest Greenwood – New York
- Steny Hoyer – Maryland
- Robert Hurt – Virginia
- Martin B. Madden – Illinois
- George A. Marden – Massachusetts
- James Murray Mason – Virginia
- William Milnes Jr. – Virginia
- James H. Osmer – Pennsylvania
- John Randolph – Virginia
- Caesar A. Rodney – Delaware
- Paul Ryan – Wisconsin
- Theodore Sedgwick – Massachusetts
- Charles Slade – Illinois
- William Henry Sowden – Pennsylvania
- Moses T. Stevens – Massachusetts
- Richard Stockton (U.S. senator) – New Jersey
- Norton Strange Townshend – Ohio
- David Gardiner Tyler – Virginia
- William D. Washburn – Minnesota
- Robert Charles Winthrop – Massachusetts
- Thomas Contee Worthington – Maryland

=== Scientists, researchers ===
- Elizabeth Blackburn
- Thomas Bland – doctor, founder of the National Indian Defense Association
- Percy Bridgman – Nobel Prize in Physics
- Robert Dewar – computer scientist
- Freeman Dyson – theoretical physicist and mathematician
- Theodore Gill – ichthyologist, mammalogist, malacologist, and librarian
- F. Duncan M. Haldane
- Oliver Hart (economist)
- George H. Hitchings
- G. Evelyn Hutchinson
- Woods Hutchinson
- Henry Way Kendall – Nobel Prize in Physics
- Willis Lamb – Nobel Prize in Physics
- Francis Ernest Lloyd
- Charles Horace Mayo – medical doctor and chemist, one of seven founders of Mayo Clinic
- William James Mayo – medical doctor and chemist, one of seven founders of Mayo Clinic
- William Worrall Mayo – medical doctor and chemist, one of seven founders of the Mayo Clinic
- George Minot – Nobel Prize in Physiology and Medicine
- Joseph Priestley – chemist
- James Renwick (physicist)
- J. Alan Robinson – philosopher, mathematician and computer scientist
- Roger Sanders
- Albert Schatz (scientist)
- Oliver Smithies
- James Dewey Watson – molecular biologist
- Thomas Bramwell Welch – discoverer of the pasteurization process to prevent the fermentation of grape juice
- Robert Burns Woodward – organic chemist, Nobel Prize in Chemistry

=== U.S. senators ===
- Nelson W. Aldrich, Rhode Island
- Samuel G. Arnold, Rhode Island
- Augustus Octavius Bacon, Georgia
- Edward Dickinson Baker, Oregon
- William T. Barry, Kentucky
- Max Baucus, Montana
- Michael Bennet, Colorado
- Bob Bennett, Utah
- Wallace F. Bennett, Utah
- Thomas H. Benton, Missouri
- William Blount, Tennessee
- Lemuel J. Bowden, Virginia
- Stephen R. Bradley, Vermont
- John Breckinridge, Kentucky
- Orville Hickman Browning, Illinois
- Frank O. Briggs, New Jersey
- Joseph R. Burton, Kansas
- Prescott Bush, Connecticut
- Andrew Butler, South Carolina
- Matthew Butler, South Carolina
- Harry F. Byrd Jr., Virginia
- Howard Cannon, Nevada
- Dudley Chase, Vermont
- Rufus Choate, Massachusetts
- John M. Clayton, Delaware
- Thomas Clayton, Delaware
- Dan Coats, Indiana
- William Cocke, Tennessee
- Susan Collins, Maine
- Walter T. Colquitt, Georgia
- Marcus A. Coolidge, Massachusetts
- Chris Coons, Delaware
- James Cooper, Pennsylvania
- Henry W. Corbett, Oregon
- Charles Curtis, Kansas
- David Daggett, Connecticut
- Chauncey Depew, New York
- Bob Dole, Kansas
- Charles E. Dudley, New York
- John Edwards, North Carolina
- Mike Enzi, Wyoming
- John Wayles Eppes, Virginia
- William Few, Georgia
- Richard Stockton Field, New Jersey
- James Fisk, Vermont
- George G. Fogg, New Hampshire
- Peter G. Gerry, Rhode Island
- Nicholas Gilman, New Hampshire
- Barry Goldwater, Arizona
- Ray Greene, Rhode Island
- Mark Hanna, Ohio
- Alexander C. Hanson, Maryland
- Orrin Hatch, Utah
- Benjamin Hawkins, North Carolina
- Carl Hayden, Arizona
- Jesse Helms, North Carolina
- Nathaniel P. Hill, Colorado
- James Hillhouse, Connecticut
- Irving Ives, New York
- Ralph Izard, South Carolina
- John W. Johnston, Virginia
- John P. Jones, Nevada
- Hamilton Fish Kean, New Jersey
- John Kerry, Massachusetts
- William H. King, Utah
- Paul G. Kirk, Massachusetts
- John Laurance, New York
- Luke Lea, Tennessee
- Blair Lee I, Maryland
- Mike Lee, Utah
- John McCain, Arizona
- Lee Mantle, Montana
- Armistead Mason, Virginia
- Stevens T. Mason, Virginia
- Mitch McConnell, Kentucky
- Roger Q. Mills, Texas
- Robert Morris, Pennsylvania
- Bill Nelson, Florida
- Robert C. Nicholas, Louisiana
- William North, New York
- William A. Palmer, Vermont
- Thomas W. Palmer, Michigan
- Nahum Parker, New Hampshire
- Frank C. Partridge, Vermont
- Samuel Pasco, Florida
- George H. Pendleton, Ohio
- Lawrence C. Phipps, Colorado
- Rob Portman, Ohio
- Jennings Randolph, West Virginia
- Harry Reid, Nevada
- Jim Risch, Idaho
- Terry Sanford North Carolina
- Jeff Sessions, Alabama
- John Smith, New York
- Samuel M. Shortridge, California
- Margaret Chase Smith, Maine
- Reed Smoot, Utah
- John P. Stockton, New Jersey
- John E. Sununu, New Hampshire
- Kingsley A. Taft, Ohio
- Robert A. Taft, Ohio
- Robert Taft Jr., Ohio
- James Taliaferro, Florida
- Littleton Waller Tazewell, Virginia
- Jon Tester, Montana
- Robert Toombs, Georgia
- Mark Udall, Colorado
- Tom Udall, New Mexico
- Malcolm Wallop, Wyoming
- Elizabeth Warren, Massachusetts
- Daniel Webster, Massachusetts
- Edward Douglass White, Louisiana
- David Wilmot, Pennsylvania

=== Sports ===
- Muhammad Ali
- Kurt Angle
- Florian Balogun
- Wade Barrett
- Rick Barry
- Earl W. Bascom (1906–1995) – rodeo champion, "Father of Modern Rodeo"
- David Beckham
- James Blake
- Garett Bolles – American football offensive tackle; played for the Snow College Badgers and the Utah Utes at the collegiate level and the Denver Broncos at the professional level
- Aaron Boone
- Bob Boone
- Bret Boone
- Ray Boone
- Dave Brain
- George Brown
- Tom Brown – baseball player
- Cody Brundage – mixed martial artist; UFC Middleweight
- Walter Carlisle
- Cameron Carter-Vickers
- Roy Castleton
- John Cena
- Paul Child
- Jazz Chisholm Jr.
- Geoff Coombes
- Harry Cooper
- Kenny Cooper – soccer player, currently plays for FC Dallas of Major League Soccer
- Colby Covington – mixed martial artist and professional and collegiate wrestler; UFC Interim Welterweight Champion and Real American Freestyle Cruiserweight Crossover Champion
- Matthew Dallman
- Jaxson Dart – American football quarterback; played for the USC Trojans and Ole Miss Rebels at the collegiate level and the New York Giants at the professional level
- Laurence Ekperigin (born 1988) – basketball player
- Jacoby Ellsbury
- Josh Emmett – mixed martial artist, submission grappler, and collegiate wrestler; UFC lightweight and featherweight
- Dick Enberg – sportscaster
- Jake Esch
- Gary Etherington
- Harry Ford
- Ian Gibaut
- Alan Green
- Dick Hall – soccer player
- Alan Hamlyn
- Dan Henderson
- Dick Higham
- Taysom Hill – American football utility player (officially played quarterback and tight end); played for the BYU Cougars at the collegiate level and the New Orleans Saints at the professional level
- Seb Hines
- Mick Hoban
- Duane Holmes
- Chase Hooper – mixed martial artist and submission grappler; UFC lightweight
- Bernie James
- Derek Jeter
- Sacha Killeya-Jones (born 1998) – basketball player
- Danny Lewis (born 1970) – basketball player
- Ryan Lochte
- Barry Mahy
- Alan Merrick
- Ken Miles
- George Moorhouse
- Yunus Musah
- Bo Nickal – mixed martial artist and freestyle wrestler; NCAA DI champion wrestler & UFC middleweight
- Chad Pennington
- Michael Petersen
- Michael Phelps
- Tarik Phillip (born 1993), British-American basketball player
- Antonee Robinson
- Mal Roche
- Chris Rodd
- Elwood Romney
- Adam Rosen – British-American luge Olympian
- Michael Roth
- Ronda Rousey
- Karlie Samuelson
- Katie Lou Samuelson
- Brendan Schaub
- Denny Shute
- Kyle Snyder – professional freestyle and folk-style wrestler; Olympic, World Championship, NCAA DI and Pan American gold-medalist wrestler, and RAF Light Heavyweight Champion
- Sean Strickland – mixed martial artist, x2 UFC Middleweight Champion
- May Sutton
- Adam Vinatieri
- Cyril Walker
- Katarina Waters – professional wrestler
- Josh West (born 1977) – British-American Olympic rower and earth sciences professor
- Harry Wright
- Chris Wyles

=== United States Supreme Court justices ===
- Oliver Ellsworth
- Oliver Wendell Holmes Jr.
- James Iredell
- John Marshall
- Sandra Day O'Connor
- William Rehnquist
- George Sutherland
- Byron White
- Levi Woodbury
- William Burnham Woods

=== Other ===
- Raymond Buckland – writer
- Henry Chadwick – known as the father of baseball
- Esther de Berdt Reed – former First Lady of Pennsylvania
- Ann Dunham – anthropologist and mother of President Barack Obama
- Daisy and Violet Hilton – co-joined twins
- Nelle Wilson Reagan – mother of President Ronald Reagan
- Frank H.T. Rhodes – university president, government science advisor
- Helen Thorpe – journalist, former First Lady of Colorado and Denver
