= Henry Howell (disambiguation) =

Henry Howell (1920–1997) was an American politician from Virginia.

Henry Howell may also refer to:

- Henry Howell (Mormon) (1828–1896), Mormon pioneer
- Henry Howell (baseball), American Negro league baseball player
- Harry Howell (cricketer) (Henry Howell, 1890–1932), footballer and cricketer
- Harry Howell (ice hockey) (Henry Vernon Howell, born 1932), ice hockey player
- Henry Ward Howell (1889–1962), American architect, partner of Edwards, Plunkett, and Howell

== See also ==
- Harry Howell (disambiguation)
