= Hugh Findlay =

Scottish Mormon missionary

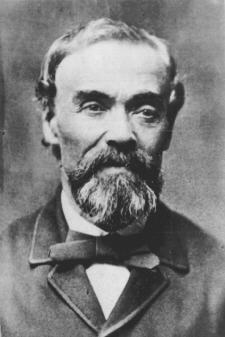
- Born: June 9, 1822; Newmilns, Ayrshire, Scotland, United Kingdom
- Died: March 1, 1900 (aged 77); Fish Haven, Idaho, United States
- Spouses: Isabella Ratray; Catherine Ann Partington; Mary Ellen Smith; Ane Marie Dorthea Nelson

Hugh Findlay (June 9, 1822 – March 2, 1900) was one of the first two Mormon missionaries to enter India and initiated Mormon missionary work in the Shetland Islands.

== Conversion ==
Findlay was baptized in Dundee, Scotland, on July 1, 1844, by missionaries from the Church of Jesus Christ of Latter-day Saints. He married Isabella Rattray that same year. Between 1847 and 1848, Isabella and the two little boys she and Findlay had together, James and Ephraim, died in what was probably a diphtheria epidemic. Both boys were under two years old.

Orson Pratt recorded the following about a case of "miraculous healing" involving Findlay in Scotland:

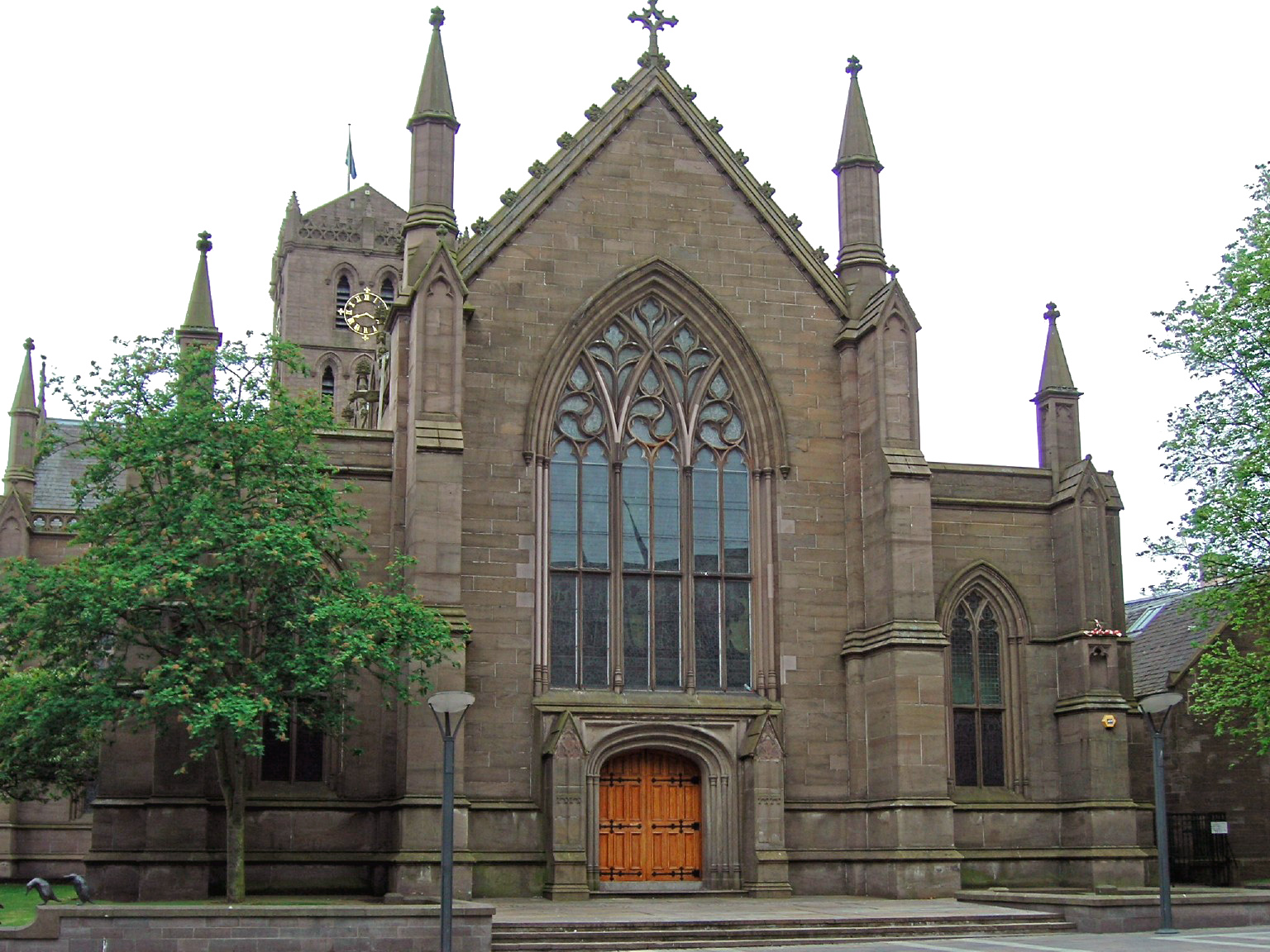
St Mary's Parish Church, Dundee, Scotland

I have a girl, aged three years, who had for eighteen months been afflicted with convulsive fits ... the child was fearful to behold, almost in continual convulsions by night and day. On the 25th of December last, Elder Hugh Findlay called and anointed her with oil in the name of the Lord and prayed for her, and from that day until now she has never had a fit ... For the truth of which, witness our hands, ...

— James Davidson, Maria Davidson, Hugh Findlay

While in England, Findlay engaged in public debates with anti-Mormon ministers from other faiths. He was serving as a district president (head of the Hull Conference) in England when Lorenzo Snow called him and William Willes to serve a mission in South Asia.

== Mission ==
Findlay and Willes arrived in 1851, seeking to build on reports from early members of the Plymouth Brethren that India would be a fertile ground for proselytization. However, almost immediately they were met by opposition from the established Protestant denominations, the press, and military officers and chaplains. Findlay labored first in Bombay (now Mumbai); Willes travelled up the Ganges to Simla.

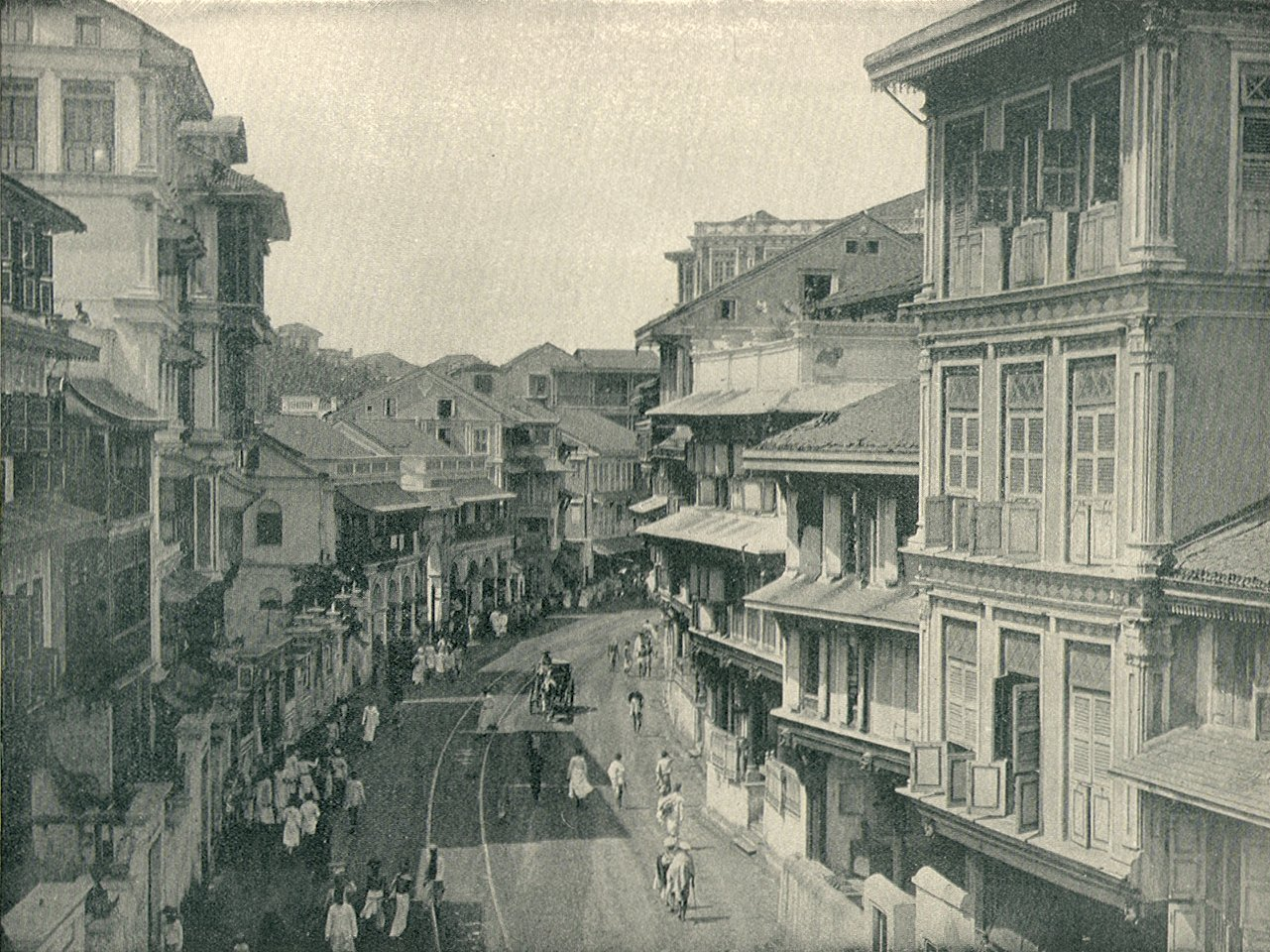
Kalbadevi Road, an important road in Bombay, in the 19th Century.

It took Findlay six months to baptize his first six converts. While in Bombay, he was restricted from all military areas (cantonments) and was forbidden to preach to military personnel. In April 1852, he moved on to Poona (now Pune), 90 miles distant, where he was eventually granted permission to proselyte. The local cantonment commander reasoned that "the less these people are opposed the less harm they would do." Findlay was eventually able to organize a branch of twelve members in Poona by mid-September 1852, a mixture of "European, Eurasian, and native." However, in October Findlay was asked to leave the cantonment. He found new quarters in a small shelter in Poona, where he continued to hold meetings with the branch. Several months later, he completed a chapel directly across the street.

After being banished from the cantonment, Findlay focused his efforts almost exclusively on the native population. He studied the Marathi language and spent considerable time discussing religion with a group of Brahmin intellectuals.

Findlay's brother Allan joined him as a missionary in India. Allan McPherson Findlay, a baker by trade, was born in New Milns, Scotland, in 1830, and was baptized in November 1846. He accepted Findlay's urgent request to join him in Bombay and Poona, without any official call from the church. He arrived on September 7, 1853, about two years after Findlay.

Hugh Findlay and his fellow missionaries ultimately found little success in India. He served in Poona and Bombay for several years, most of it alone. Brigham Young ordered the mission closed in 1855. Historians have concluded the mission's significance lies is in its failure to secure more than a handful of converts, in contrast with other missions at the time (in Scandinavia and the British Isles) that were extremely successful.

== Emigration and settling Utah ==
Findlay completed his mission and departed Bombay on March 15, 1855. He and a few fellow Mormons emigrated by way of Hong Kong (where they baptized one convert) to the United States, arriving later that year. He married 23-year-old Catherine Ann Partington on March 25, 1856, in the Endowment House. Brigham Young performed the ceremony.

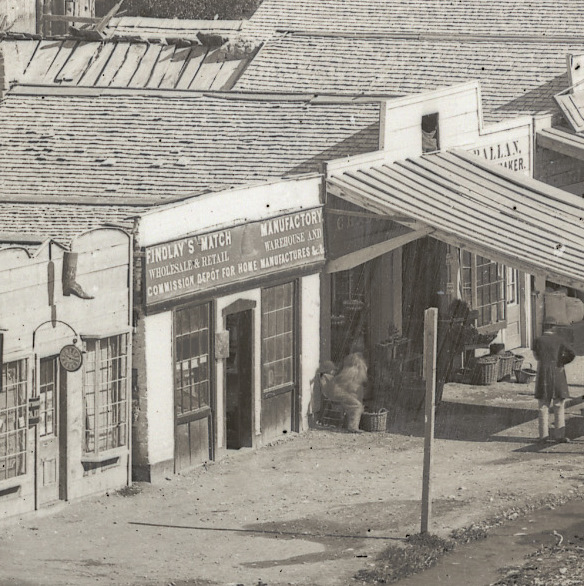
Findlay's Match Manufactory, Main Street, Salt Lake City.

The couple helped settle Riverdale, Utah, where Hugh made a living by manufacturing and selling matches. They eventually had nine children together.

In 1857 Findlay began practicing plural marriage when he married 16-year-old Mary Ellen Smith, with whom he eventually had seven children. In 1858, he became Riverdale's first school teacher, and in 1860 he joined a bishopric in Riverdale as a counselor. He was also at one time the president of the "17th Ward Silk Producing Society".

In June 1862, Hugh Findlay's 19-year-old brother-in-law, Jared Smith, was killed in the Morrisite War. Smith had been engaged to Ane Marie Dorthea Nelson, a 19-year-old Danish immigrant. The next month, Findlay married Ane Marie. They had three children together and raised them as if they were Jared's.

By 1864, Findlay was in Salt Lake City manufacturing and selling matches at a store on Main Street. An 1865 Deseret News advertisement noted he sold other products as well, including stereoscopic boxes.

Allan emigrated to the U.S. via Liverpool, England, sailing on the Ship Thornton to New York City. On the second day at sea, 26-year-old Allan married Jessie Ireland, a 28-year-old whom the ship's manifest identified as a spinster, although they had been dating for about ten years. They rendezvoused in New York with Allan and Hugh's mother (Mary McPherson Findlay), then headed west. Although they crossed the plains with the ill-fated Willie Handcart Company, all three survived and made it to Salt Lake City.

== Later life ==
In the Fall of 1869, Brigham Young called Findlay and his families to help settle the Bear Lake country. They arrived on May 22, 1870, and along with Henry Howell helped settle Fish Haven, Idaho, where he later served as Bishop. Ane Marie died in Fish Haven in 1872 at age 29.

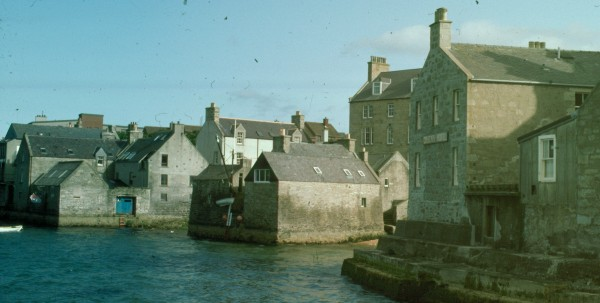
Lerwick, main port in the Shetland Islands

In 1878 the church called him to open a mission in the Shetland Islands, an archipelago northeast of Scotland. He arrived on January 4, 1879, and on March 31 baptized the islands' first two converts.

On May 5, 1879, Orson Pratt (who was also in the British Isles at the time) received a letter from John Taylor, instructing him to obtain electroplates for a new edition of the Doctrine & Covenants. Findlay and three other men helped him divide the text into verses and supply references.

While in Shetland he was asked to preside over the Scotland Mission. One history records:

He had no money with which to pay his steamboat passage to Scotland, but, true to his unwavering faith, he packed his suitcase, ready to obey, and walked toward the wharf where he was to sail. As he passed the post office, he asked for his mail and received a letter from a strange lady who wrote him of her interest in articles he had written for the Millennial Star and enclosed for him a five-pound note which was equal to about twenty-five dollars in American money.

He was released as president of the Scotland Mission in 1880. He returned to his families in Fish Haven, where he served as a Patriarch until his death on March 2, 1900.

== Articles ==
- Findlay, Hugh (15 January 1882). "Ornaments and Dress in India". Juvenile Instructor. 17: 29.
- Findlay, Hugh (1 February 1882). "A Funeral to the East". Juvenile Instructor. 17: 43.

== Publications ==
- Findlay, Hugh (1853). "The Mormons" Or "Latter-day-Saints": A Reply. Bombay: Dustur Ashkara Press. OCLC 20471665.
- Findlay, Hugh (1855). To the Marattas of Hindoostan: A Treatise on the True and Living God and His Religion (in Marathi). Bombay: Gunput Crushnajee's Press. OCLC 20473523.
