= Partington (disambiguation) =

Partington may refer to:

- Partington is a town and civil parish in the Metropolitan Borough of Trafford, Greater Manchester, England.
- Partington (now Stuart) is a rural coastal suburb in the City of Townsville, Queensland, Australia.
- Partington is an English surname.
