= Genevieve Partington =

Ghanaian human rights activist

Genevieve Partington is a human rights activist, feminist and director of Amnesty International Ghana.

== Education ==
Genevieve attended University of Ghana in Accra where she studied Political Science and French for her Bachelor of Arts degree. She holds a Master of Arts (MA) in Development Studies from the Institute of Social Studies, Erasmus University Rotterdam, Netherlands. She earned an MA in International Relations and Political Science from Jean Moulin University Lyon 3.

== Career ==
Genevieve is a human rights advocate and international development expert. She has worked in Ghana, France, and The Netherlands.

She worked in various capacities at the French Embassy in Ghana, Child and Youth Finance International, and at Oxfam as the Regional Gender Project Coordinator. She was appointed the country director of Amnesty International Ghana in February 2023 and is the first female director since its establishment in 1973.

== Human rights positions ==
Genevieve advocated for citizens' rights to protest as a fundamental right guaranteed by human rights charters, not a privilege.

She has supported abolishing the death penalty. She has also advocated for the amendment of Ghana's National Health Insurance Act to accommodate free medical care for victims of sexual violation, and has been outspoken regarding the implementation of the country's Public Order Act, calling for allowance of spontaneous protests. Under the Act, protests require at least 5 days' notice to police, but many that are planned months in advance are broken up by authorities, according to activist Oliver Barker-Vormawor.
