= Harry Howell =

Harry Howell may refer to:

- Harry Howell (cricketer) (1890–1932), English cricketer and footballer
- Harry Howell (ice hockey) (1932–2019), Canadian hockey player
- Harry Howell (baseball) (1876–1956), American baseball player
- Harry Howell (footballer) (born 2008-), English footballer

== See also ==
- Henry Howell (disambiguation)
