= Richard Gay Somerset =

British painter (1848–1928)

Richard Gay Somerset (1848–1928) was a British painter, a principal member of the Manchester School of Painters.

== Life and work ==
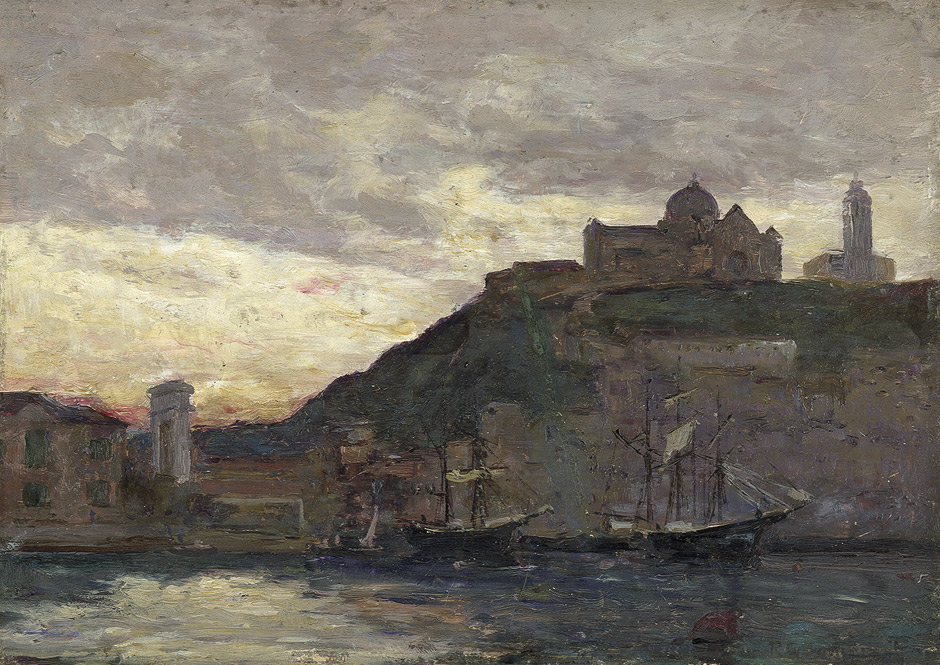
View of Ancona in the evening, c. 1902.

Somerset was born in Manchester. He attended the Manchester School of Art, became a principal member of the Manchester School of Painters and was one of the oldest members of the Manchester Academy of Fine Arts.

He made several painting trips to the Mediterranean.

Moving to Betws-y-Coed, North Wales, Somerset was one of the "first thirty one" founder members of the Royal Cambrian Academy of Art (RCA) in 1882.

== Reception ==
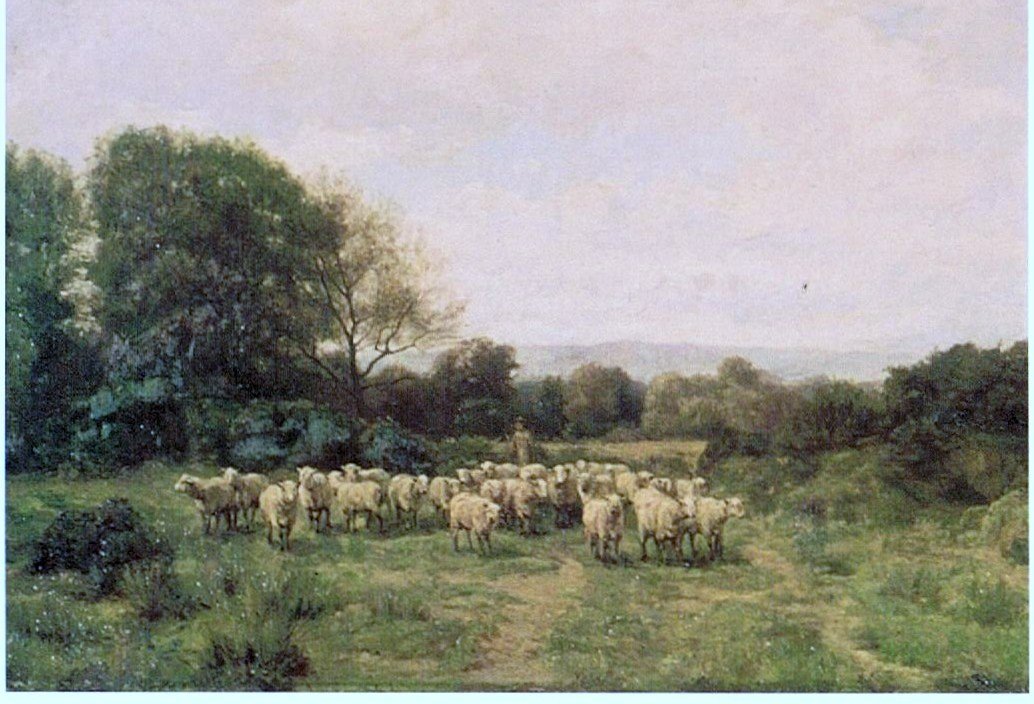
Surrey Pastoral, c. 1876, Manchester Art Gallery.

A painting by Somerset in the Royal Manchester Institution's exhibition on Modern Art in 1877 was praised by the Manchester Courier's art critic:

"His fine landscape representing a view near Milford in Surrey is one of the most complete and satisfactory landscape in the collection. It is remarkable for its agreeable tone and rich pearly quality of colour; some passages are remarkably fine, such as the middle distance, the tree work on the left of the canvas, and the beautiful turflike quality of the foreground. The whole canvas is full of light and atmosphere and full of bright promise for the future."

A painting by Somerset was the first to be obtained by the Manchester Permanent Art Gallery.

== Collections ==
As of 3 April 2023, Somerset's work is included in at least two permanent collections:

- Manchester Art Gallery, Manchester: 4 works
- National Museum Cardiff, Cardiff: 1 work
