= Frances Peralta =

American opera singer

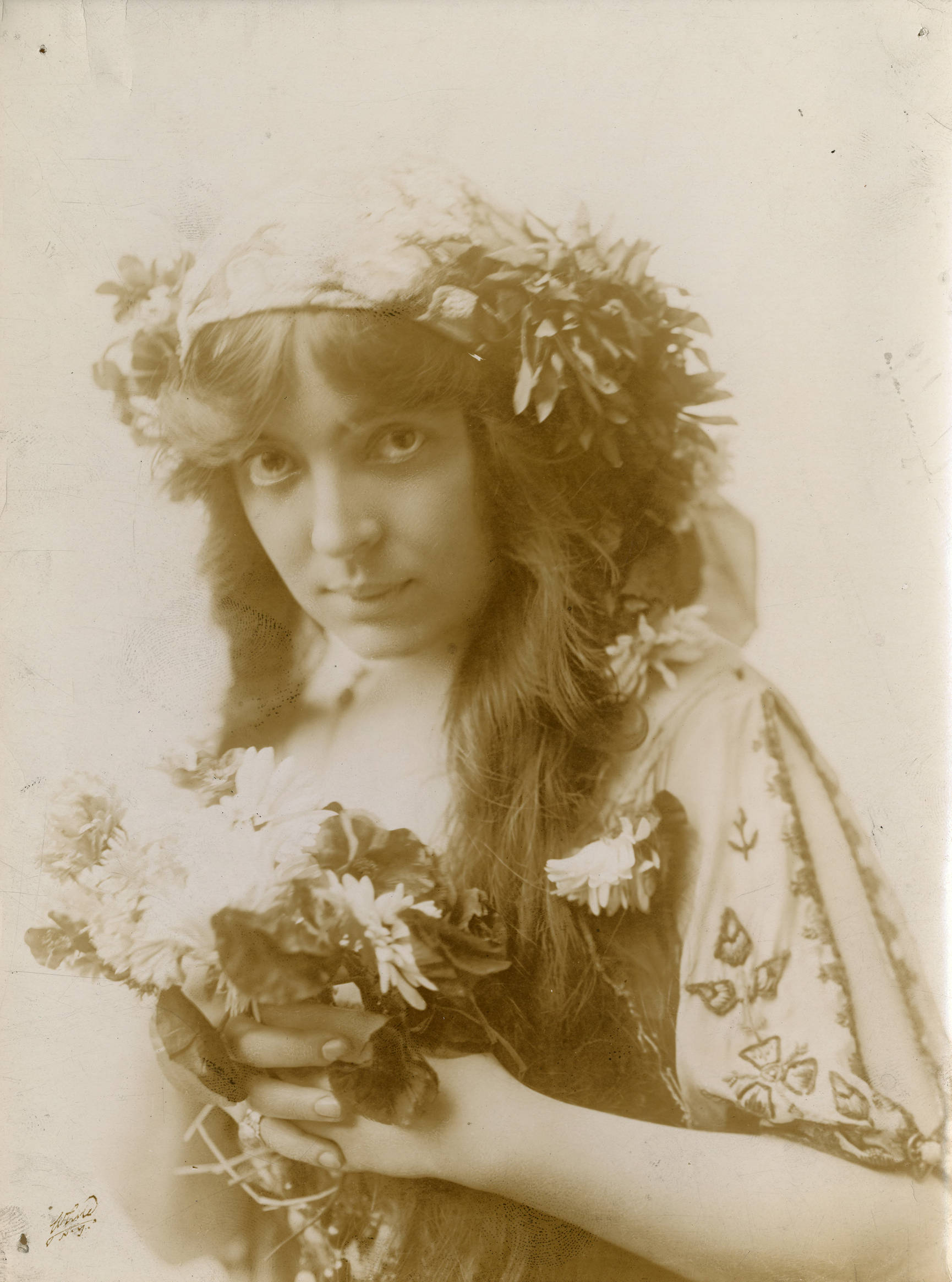
Peraltac. 1913

Frances Peralta (19 March 1883 – 22 December 1933) was an American opera singer.

== Biography ==
She was born in Manchester, England, as Phyllis Partington; her father was John Herbert Evelyn Partington, a well-known painter, and her mother was Sarah Ann Partington (née Mottershead). Several of her siblings were in the arts, including her sisters Blanche, a writer, and Gertrude, an artist. The family emigrated to California when she was a child.

In 1911 she was appearing in a comic opera in New York's Globe Theatre when the star, Marguerite Sylva, fell ill, and Peralta (who was still using her birth name at this time) was given the opportunity to sing the lead. She apparently did well enough for the manager to alternate the two sopranos in the lead role for the remainder of the run. In 1913 she returned to Europe and studied with Salvatore Cottone and José Mardones. By now she was using the name Phyllis Peralta.

After some appearances in touring performances in the United States, Peralta (now using the name Francesca Peralta) sang Aida and Nedda in St. Louis in productions of Aida and Pagliacci. She sang briefly with the Chicago Opera Association, and in 1920 made her first appearance at the New York Metropolitan Opera as Elena in Arrigo Boito's Mefistofele, on Christmas Day, the day after Enrico Caruso's last performance there. She sang regularly at the Met until 1926, portraying such roles as Alice Ford in Falstaff, Dorabella in Così fan tutte, Elizabeth in Don Carlo, Ginevra in 'La cena delle beffe and Mona Lisa, Giulietta in The Tales of Hoffmann, Leonora in Il trovatore and La Forza del Destino, Maddalena in Andrea Chénier, Mathilde in William Tell, Santuzza in Cavalleria Rusticana, Sélika in L'Africaine, Venus in Tannhäuser, and the title roles in Aida, La Gioconda, Franco Leoni's L'Oracolo, and Tosca among others.

Peralta was diagnosed with cancer in early 1927, and only occasionally appeared at the Met thereafter. Her last stage appearance appears to have been at Bryant Park in Manhattan on 13 September 1931. She died at her home on West 58th Street on 22 December 1933.
