= Edward S. Renwick =

American mechanical engineer, inventor and patent expert

- Born: 1823
- Died: 1912 (aged 88–89)
- Occupation(s): Mechanical engineer inventor patent expert
- Spouse: Elizabeth Anne Brevoort (m. 1862)
- Parent(s): James Renwick; Margaret Brevoort Renwick

For the Louisiana political commentator, see Ed Renwick.

Edward Sabine Renwick (1823–1912) was an American mechanical engineer, inventor and patent expert.

== Early life ==
Renwick lost most of his eyesight while working as a patent examiner. He worked for a time in Wilkes-Barre as an ironmaster, but failed.

== Family connections ==
His father, James Renwick, Sr., was a Professor of chemistry and physics at Columbia University. His mother, Margaret, was a member of the Brevoort family of New York. One brother, James Renwick Jr., was a leading US architect, designer of St. Patrick's Cathedral, Grace Church, Vassar College, the Smithsonian Institution and the Croton Aqueduct. The other, Henry, was a former steamboat inspector and co-author with his father. His grandmother Jean Jeffrey/Jeannie Jaffray of Lochmaben was the Blue-Eyed Lassie mentioned in Robert Burns' poem I gaed a waefu' gate yestreen. Charles Wilkes was an uncle of his.

Edward Renwick married Elizabeth Anne Brevoort in 1862.

== Inventions ==
Renwick formulated at least 25 inventions over his lifetime, including a combination chicken brooder and incubator, and a self-binding reaping machine. He sued Cyrus McCormick over royalties, but was awarded none.

His patent dates stretch from 1850 (age 27) to 1904 (age 81).

== Great Eastern ==
One of his greatest achievements was the designing and supervising, with his brother Henry, of a repairing of a break in the bilge of the Great Eastern steamship with a floating caisson, clamped to the hull. It was 104 feet (32 m) long by 15 feet (4.6 m) wide and 8 feet (2.4 m) deep.

== Later life ==
He later settled in Millburn, New Jersey in 1867. He built a large Victorian mansion at 140 Old Short Hills Road which stood until 2001. He died there in 1912 at the age of 89.

== Sources ==
- Renwick Family Letters and Manuscripts 1794-1916
- A History of Millburn Township by Marian Meisner, Chapter XVIII
- History of the Atlantic Cable & Undersea Communications Great Eastern by Bill Glover
- James Dugan, The Great Iron Ship, 1953 ISBN 0-7509-3447-6, pgs 149-155
- Black, George Fraser, Scotland's Mark on America, 1921

== Resources ==
- Scotland's Mark on America at Project Gutenberg
- Renwick, Edward S. (1893). Patentable invention (PDF). Rochester, N.Y. 168 pages.
