= Gertrude Partington Albright =

British-American painter

- Born: Gertrude Partington; 11 September 1874; Heysham, Lancashire, England
- Died: 7 September 1959 (aged 84); San Francisco, California, United States
- Education: Académie Delécluse
- Occupations: Painter, professor, illustrator
- Known for: landscape paintings, portrait etchings
- Spouse: Oliver Herman Albright (m. 1917–1944; his death)
- Parents: John Herbert Evelyn Partington (father); Sarah Partington (mother)

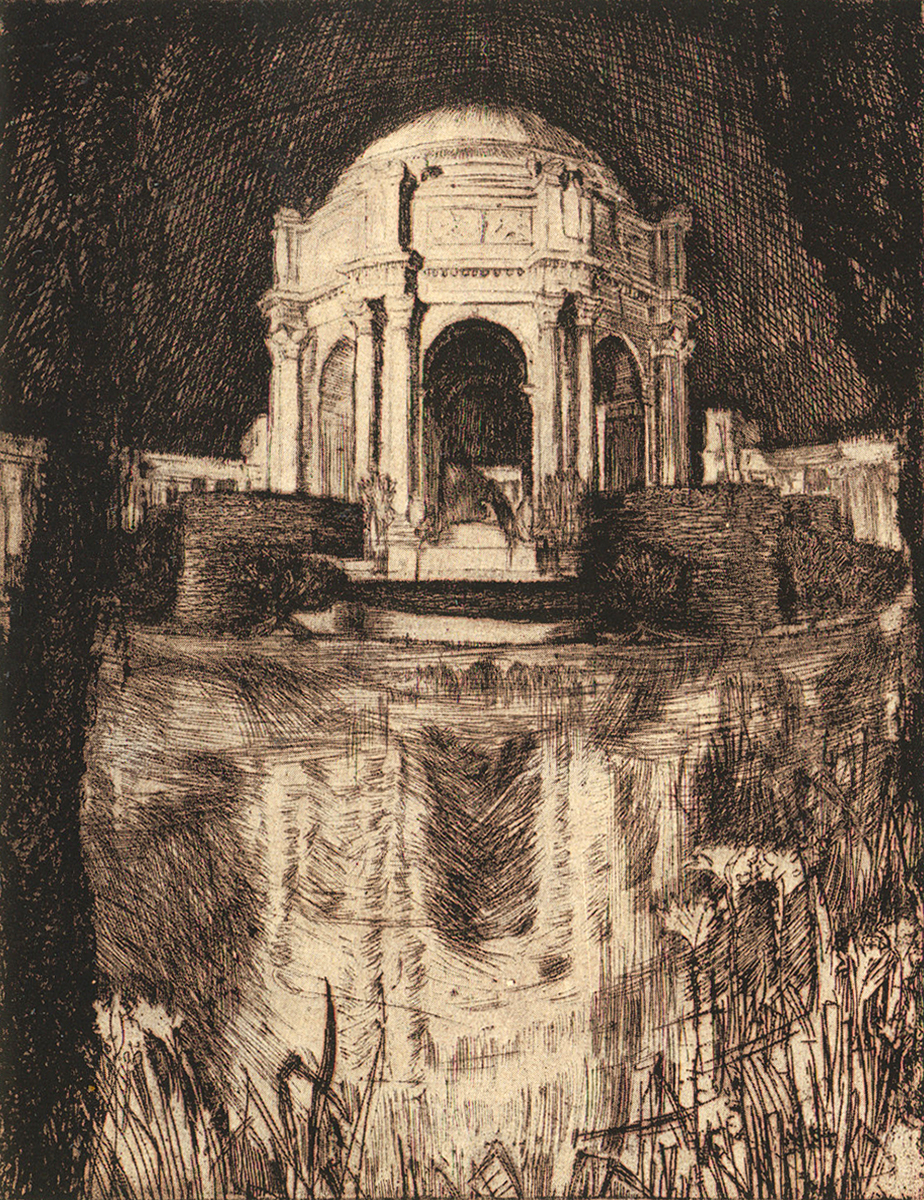
Gertrude Partington Albright, A Structure Brave: Palace of Fine Arts, etching. Published in Cora Lenore Williams' book The Fourth-Dimensional Reaches of the Exposition, 1915.

Gertrude Partington Albright (September 11, 1874 – September 7, 1959) was a British-born American artist known for portrait etchings and her Cubism-influenced California landscapes. She taught at the California School of Fine Arts for nearly thirty years.

== Family and education ==
She was born Gertrude Partington in Heysham, a coastal village in England. Her father was John Herbert Evelyn Partington (1843–99), a painter, and her mother was Sarah (Mottershead) Partington. Four of her six siblings also had careers in the arts, notably Blanche, who became a writer; Phyllis, who became an opera singer under the stage name Frances Peralta; John, who became a theater manager; and Richard, who became an artist.

Her family emigrated to the United States in 1889, settling in Oakland, California. In 1917, she married Herman Oliver Albright (born Herman Oliver Albrecht in Germany; 1876–1944), also a landscape painter.

She died on September 7, 1959 in San Francisco. Her papers are held by the Bancroft Library at the University of California, Berkeley.

== Art education and career ==
She got her early training in art from her father and was only 16 when she sold her first artwork. For a time she worked as an illustrator for the San Francisco Examiner, contributing courtroom sketches and society portraits. She eventually earned enough money as an illustrator to afford a trip to Europe for further art training, enrolling at the Académie Delécluse in the late 1890s. By 1903, she was exhibiting at the Paris Salon.

Albright stayed abroad for several years, making occasional return trips to California. When she returned to the Bay Area for good in 1912, she opened a painting and printmaking studio on Post Street. An established artist by then, she joined the faculty at the California School of Fine Arts in 1917, teaching painting and etching. She was promoted to associate professor in 1932 and remained at the school until she retired in 1946. Her students there included Victor Arnautoff. She also sat on the school's board of directors.

Albright was often commissioned to make portraits, and her portrait etchings drew praise for their skillful likenesses and clear, minimal lines. She is also known for her Cubism-inflected Post-Impressionist landscapes done in oil on wood. Critics noted the strong influence of Paul Cézanne on her paintings but considered that her work succeeded on its own merits. She exhibited widely, winning a bronze medal for one of her portraits at the 1915 Panama–Pacific International Exposition. Her work is in the collections of museums including the Metropolitan Museum of Art, the Oakland Museum, and the De Young Museum.

She was active in Bay Area art organizations, becoming a charter member of the California Society of Etchers and the director of the San Francisco Society of Women Artists and serving on many prize juries.
