= Manchester School of Painters =

19th-century school

The Manchester School of Painters was formed by a number of disgruntled young vanguard painters in the 1870s. They were deeply influenced by the artist Joseph Knight, who was a successful painter, etcher and photographer. He was the founder member of the Manchester School of Painters. Knight painted how he desired and refused to conform to traditional Art School rules and this appealed to his young admirers. Twice weekly they would all meet up at Knight's studio in York Place behind the Union Chapel in Oxford Road, Manchester to discuss new ways to develop their techniques.

The group adopted new teaching and working methods, experimenting with different tones and colors. Following a four-month period in Pont-Aven, Brittany, the group was influenced by the diverse techniques of the painters associated with the Pont-Aven School.

They were disillusioned with Manchester Art School's method of teaching, i.e. the South Kensington system of art education (laborious precision drawing from the antique.) Partington was so outraged he opened his own school in Stockport based on the same lines as the Académie Julian, Paris where masters and students worked together with a life model.

The more they experimented the more criticism they received from the Manchester art critics and the old school of painters. It took them over ten years to establish The Manchester School and for them to be finally accepted by the critics.

== Joseph Knight ==
Knight (1837–1909) was a member of the Manchester Academy of Fine Arts, joining in January 1868. He withdrew in 1879 and was re-elected in 1883. He was also elected a member of the Dudley Gallery, the Royal Institute of Painters in Water Colours, the Royal Etchers, the Royal Cambrian Academy of Art, the Limners Club and Art-Min-Afon, Betws-y-Coed. In 1874 he was a Royal Manchester Institution prize-winner and in 1891 he won a bronze medal at the Paris Exhibition.

At the Royal Academy his works were frequently hung on the line. His work is in their permanent collection as well as at the Victoria and Albert Museum, Tate Gallery London, Manchester Art Gallery, Walker Art Gallery and other provincial galleries.

== Principal Members of the Manchester School of Painters ==
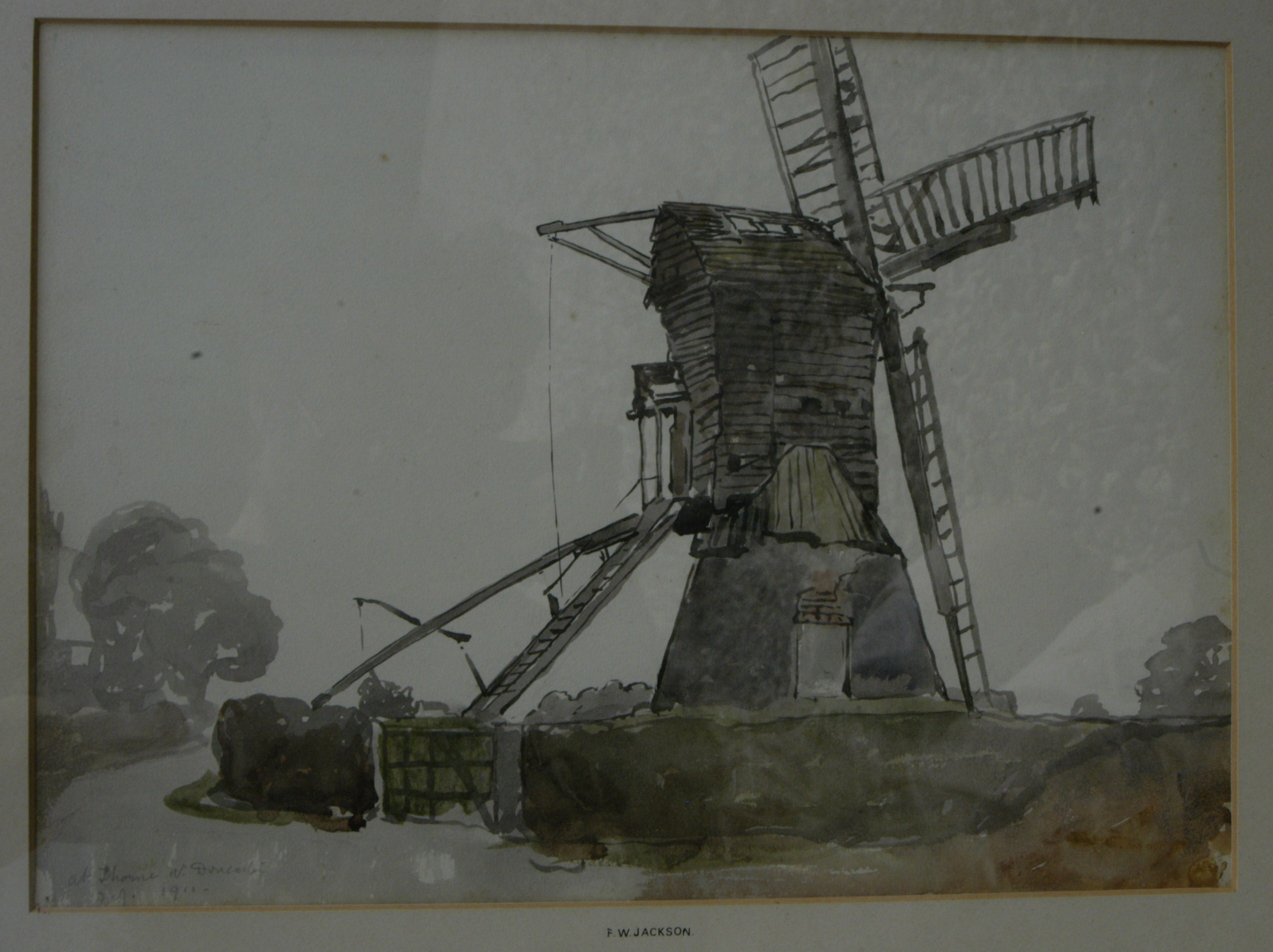
Windmill at Thorne, 1911, a late watercolour by F. W. Jackson. Thorne is 12 miles north-north-east of Doncaster.

- Joshua Anderson Hague – 1850–1916
- John Houghton Hague – 1842–1934
- James Hey Davies – 1844–1930
- Frederick William Jackson – 1859–1918
- William Meredith – 1851–1916
- John Herbert Evelyn Partington – 1843–1899
- Richard Gay Somerset – 1848–1928

== Biographics of principal members ==
=== Joshua Anderson Hague ===
Joshua Anderson Hague (1850–1916) was born in Rusholme. His first school was Birch, and later Withington. At sixteen he went to the Manchester School of Art and studied under its head, Mr. Buckley (1868–70). Around 1872–73 he moved to Crosses, near Southport. He married Sara Henshall of Heaton Norris in 1875 and they had four sons and two daughters. One of his sons Anderson (Dick) Hague exhibited at the RA, RCA, MAFA and Walker Art Gallery, Liverpool.

In 1877 they moved to Tywyn near Conwy in North Wales. Here he founded, with Edward Norbury, at Plas Mawr, the Royal Cambrian Academy in 1881 and became its Vice President. In 1889 he moved to Deganwy where he spent the rest of his life.

He often exhibited at the Royal Manchester Institution. In 1873 he became a full member of the Manchester Academy in which he played an extremely active business role for forty-three years.

In 1889 he had a one-man exhibition at the Brasenose Club and in 1908 forty-five of his paintings were in a retrospective show at the Manchester City Art Gallery. He also exhibited at the Royal Academy and was awarded the silver medal at the International Exhibition in Paris.

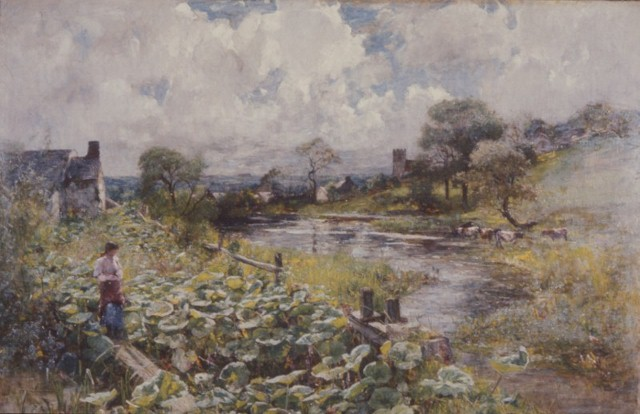
Spring - Manchester Art Gallery

In 1899 the art critic Maxwell Enoch wrote the following about Hague's work:

"He now paints with a delightful and delicate greyness, and has gradually become stronger in color and more dexterous in handling. He paints in a manner that is absolutely his own. There is no landscape painter at present working in England who shows so much individuality in his work. The most simple subjects he is able to invest with a beauty and tone that is delightful."

=== John Houghton Hague ===
John Houghton Hague (1842–1934) was born at Newton Heath on 29 October 1842 and died at his home, Glencairn Queens Road Oldham in April 1934.

His father, Samuel Hague, founded the cotton spinning business at Hawthorn and Newlands Mills later known as Messrs. Samuel Hague & Co., (1920) Limited. Houghton retained an interest in this business.

He was educated at a boarding school near Altrincham and also at the Manchester School of Art. He studied art in France during 1872 and then stayed four months at Pont-Aven, Brittany. On his return he became a master at the Oldham School of Art and was associated with Charles Poller, R O Bottomley and Tom Heywood. Amongst his pupils were Fred Jackson, William Stott, and George Wimpenny. He married in 1885 and had a daughter, Nellie, on 19 March 1888.

For many years he was an active member of the Antiquarian Society and was also interested in the work of the Oldham Microscopical Society. He had an unbroken membership of the Oldham Lyceum extending over sixty-two years, having joined in 1872. He also painted in Belgium and Sweden and was a member of the Belgium Academy of Fine Arts

"In an age prior to the mass use of photography Houghton Hague's works are now invaluable as documentary sources. Taken with his collection of transcribed songs and poems they form a chronicle of life in and around Chadderton during the last quarter of the nineteenth century.".

Oldham Street Sweepers 1873, Gallery Oldham

A number of his paintings can be seen in Gallery Oldham, including the depiction on the right showing Oldham's cobbled Market Place being swept clean by a gang of street sweepers.

"In company with his friend, R O Bottomley, he did much work in and around Chadderton Fold, which in the seventies was a rural hamlet. He was to be seen there frequently between 1870 and 1880, and got much of the groundwork for his illustrations for the works of Edwin Waugh, Ben Brierley and Samuel Laycock."

=== James Hey Davies ===
Janes Hey Davies (1844–1930) was born in Manchester on 11 February 1844. He attended the Manchester School of Art under J. Muckley (1868–70). Protesting at the teaching methods practised by the school he left it along with J A Hague, W Meredith, J H E Partington and R G Somerset and enrolled as a student at the Manchester Academy. He attended the R.A. schools and won the Turner Gold Medal for a painting, Under the Opening Eyelids of the Morn.

He first exhibited at the Royal Manchester Institution in 1872 and was an Associate of the Manchester Academy of Fine Arts in 1873, becoming a full member a year later. In 1874 he went to study art in France and Sweden. He was a member of the Royal Cambrian Society, a committee member of the Limners Club and a committee member of the Manchester Art Club in 1887. His address when he died was Fenwick Street, Hulme, Manchester.

=== Frederick William Jackson ===
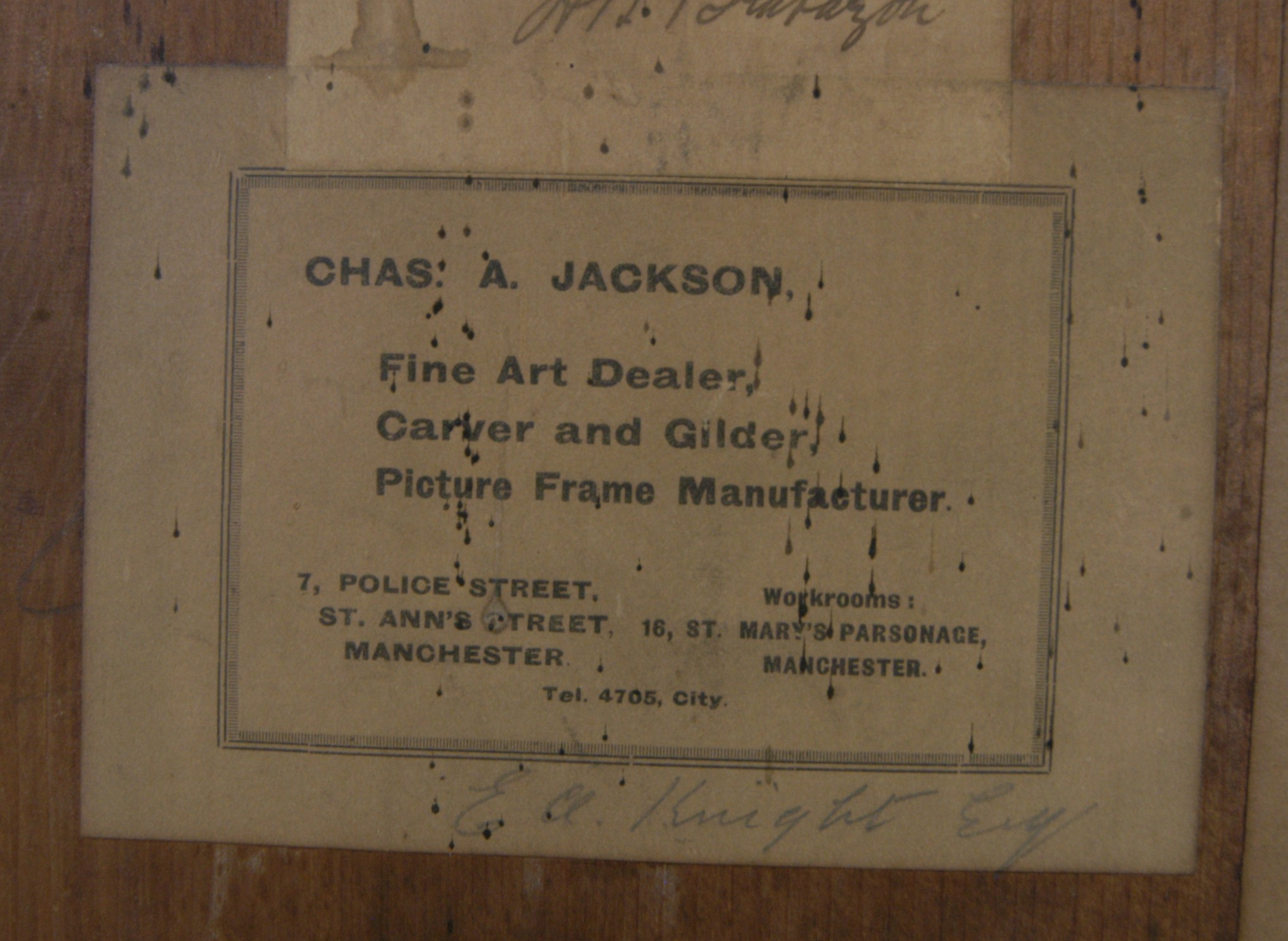
Chas A Jackson 1920s picture label.

Frederick William Jackson (1859–1918) was born at Middleton Junction, Oldham in 1859. He was the son of an art dealer and photographer. He had two brothers, Vincent Jackson, a musician trained at Leipzig Conservatoire and Charles Arthur Jackson, who was also an art dealer in Police Street, Manchester. He attended evening classes at the Oldham Lyceum where John Houghton Hague was one of the teachers. When the school was demolished he transferred to the Manchester School of Art. He travelled at length, always painting in the open air. He worked in Russia, where it was several degrees below zero, North Africa and various parts of Europe. A former student of his, Laura Knight, described Jackson painting outside in the following way: "He would paint out of doors in any weather. Under the mittens he wore his hands were swollen, stiff and chapped, as were the edges of his ears and the wings of his nostrils."

He first exhibited at the Royal Academy in 1880, and was a frequent exhibitor at the Manchester Academy of Fine Arts and Yorkshire Union of Artists. He was a member of the Arts Club in 1879, the Limners Club in 1880 and the Manchester Academy of Fine Arts in 1881. He was a founder member of the Staithes group and Art Club. He was also a founder member of the New English Art Club in 1886 and later in 1894 he was elected to the R.B.A.

In Paris he enrolled as a student at the Académie Julian under the tutors, Lefebvre and Boulanger and in 1884 and 1885 he was accepted at the Salon (Paris). Here he would meet up with his friends, William and Edward Stott, Henry Herbert La Thangue and James Charles, who were also studying in Paris.

Jackson was a good friend of the Middleton born architect, Edgar Wood and through his influence he became involved in the Arts and Crafts Movement and mural painting. In 1892 Jackson designed a murial entitled Seedtime and Harvest for the Old Road Unitarian Chapel,

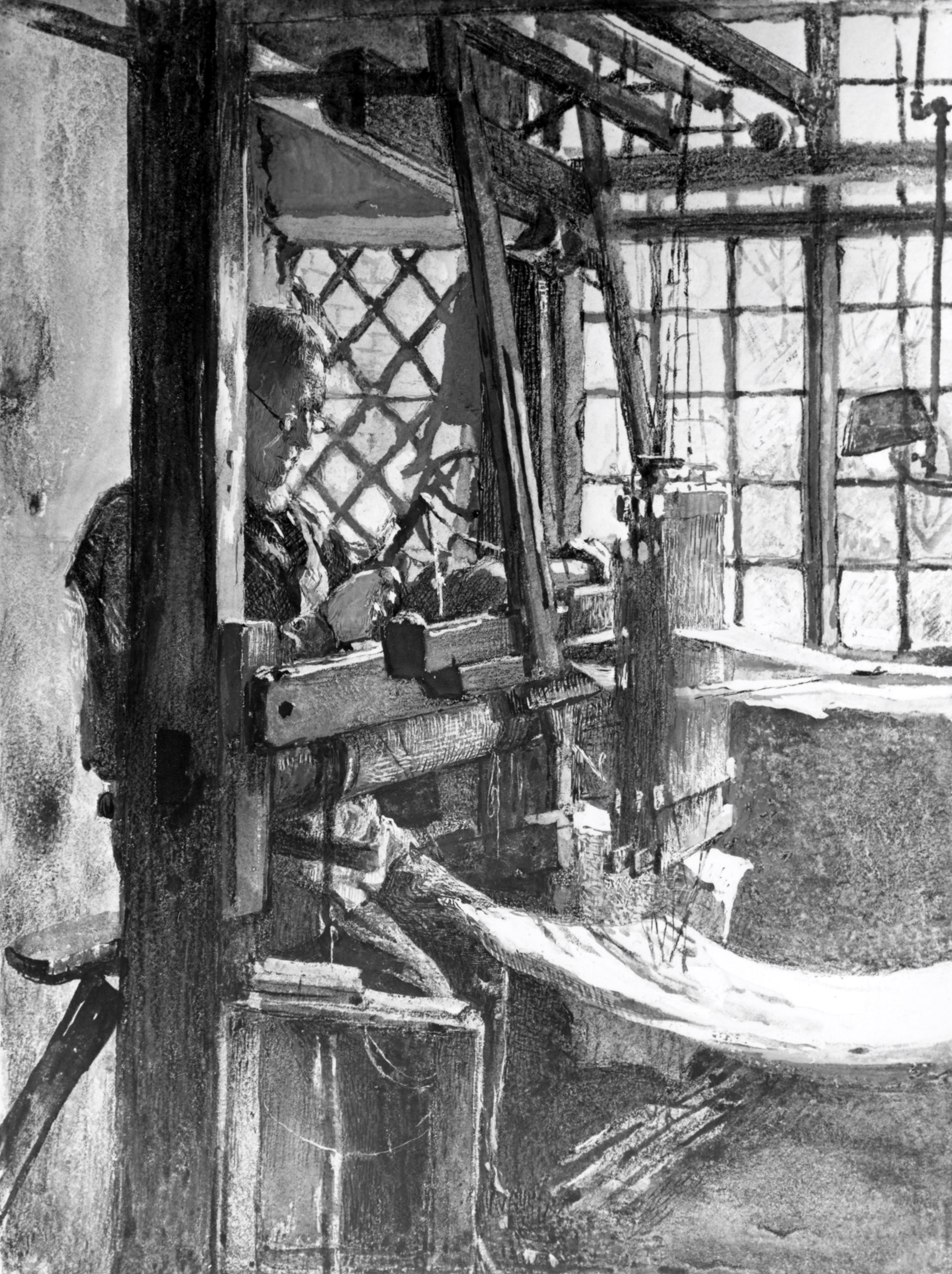
Hand Loom Weaver, Manchester Art Gallery

Middleton (demolished 1965). Some of his other mural commissions were:

- 1894 a frieze at Briarcourt House, Lindley for H. H. Sykes (Wood's brother-in-law)
- Mural for the living room of Wood's own house, Redcroft, Rochdale Road, Middleton (built in 1891)
- A frieze of The Holy Grail for Birkley Lodge, Huddersfield (built in 1901)

As an illustrator he produced a number of drawings for the well known dialect writer Ben Brierley's "Ab-o'th-Yate Sketches." One of his sketches "The Hand Loom Weaver" appears as the Frontispiece for Vol. III.

He finally settled in Hinderwell and was married in 1907. He died in December 1918, and a large Memorial Exhibition was held at the Manchester City Art Gallery. A letter of appreciation of his life and work, by Sir George Clausen was read out at the opening ceremony.

=== William Meredith ===
William Meredith (1851–1916) was born in Manchester. He was described as a thorough Bohemian and entertaining conversationalist. He became well known for his black and white pictures

At the age of twelve he attended evening classes at the School of Art in the Royal Manchester Institution and then entered the Manchester Academy where he was elected a Sociate in 1872, and a member two years later. He became a member of the Brasenose Club.

His subjects were mainly seaside and country landscapes, often on a large scale and painted entirely outdoors. North Wales, Surrey, Brittany and Normandy were his favourite haunts.

=== John Herbert Evelyn Partington ===
==== Manchester ====
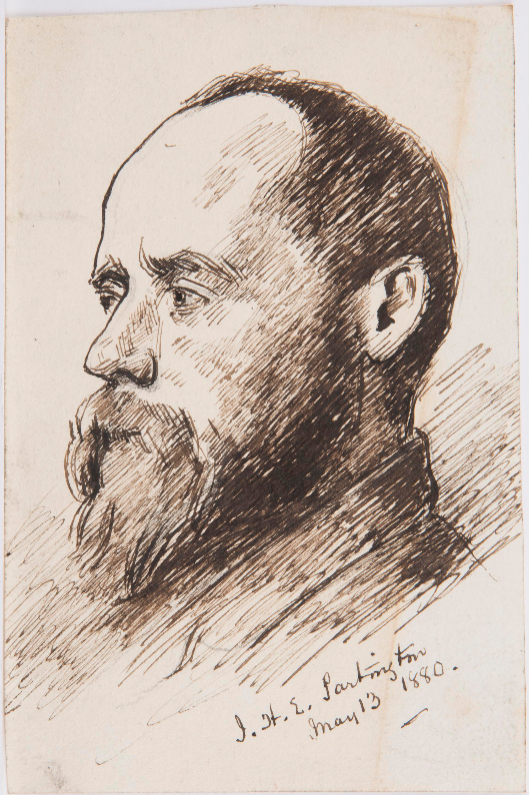
J. H. E. Partington by John Miller Nicholson, 1880

John Herbert Evelyn Partington (1843–1899) started painting at thirteen. At the age of fifteen he received tuition from a journeyman house painter. He left England for America, but couldn't settle and returned. He was then employed as a mechanical draftsmen for a Professor Scott Burn. He attended the Manchester School of Art under the head, Mr. Muckley 1868-1870 who helped him to get a position at Messrs Shaw of St. Chad's at Saddleworth as a designer of cartoons and painter of figures in stained glass. He joined the Manchester Academy and within a month was made an Associate. A year later at the age of twenty-eight he received full membership. He first exhibited at the Royal Academy in 1872, and was a member of the Manchester Literary and Philosophical Society producing various articles and drawings.

He established an art school in Stockport which was run on the same lines as the Academie Julian, Paris where masters and students worked together with a live model.

==== California ====
For health reasons Partington, his wife and seven children emigrated to Oakland, California. All seven children achieved success in careers connected with the arts: Blanche Partington, Richard Langtry Partington and Gertrude Partington Albright as artists, Phyllis Partington as an opera singer under the name Frances Peralta, and John Allan Partington as a theater manager.

His son Richard Langtry Partington (1868–1929) helped him establish The Partington School of Illustrating, at 414 Pine Street, San Francisco. When the school was destroyed by fire in 1906 Richard became the curator of the Piedmont Art Gallery. Partington taught at the school for eight years. He died at his home in East Oakland, and was buried on 30 January 1899 at Mountain View Cemetery.

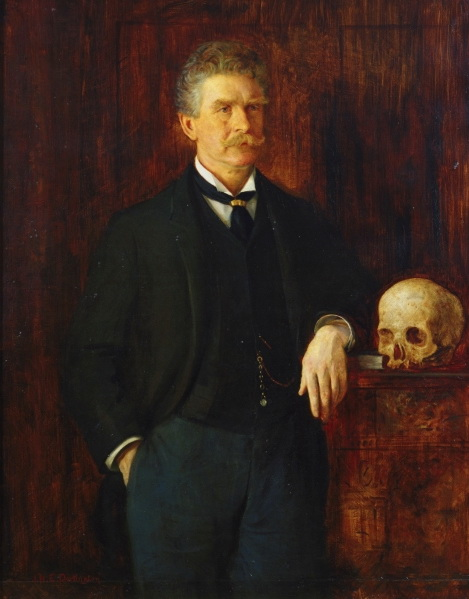
Ambrose Bierce

He produced numerous prestigious portraits whilst living in California, including one of Ambrose Gwinnett Bierce who became well known for his The Devil's Dictionary, 1906, a volume of ironic definitions. He was awarded a gold medal at the California Midwinter Int'l expo, 1894.

=== Richard Gay Somerset ===
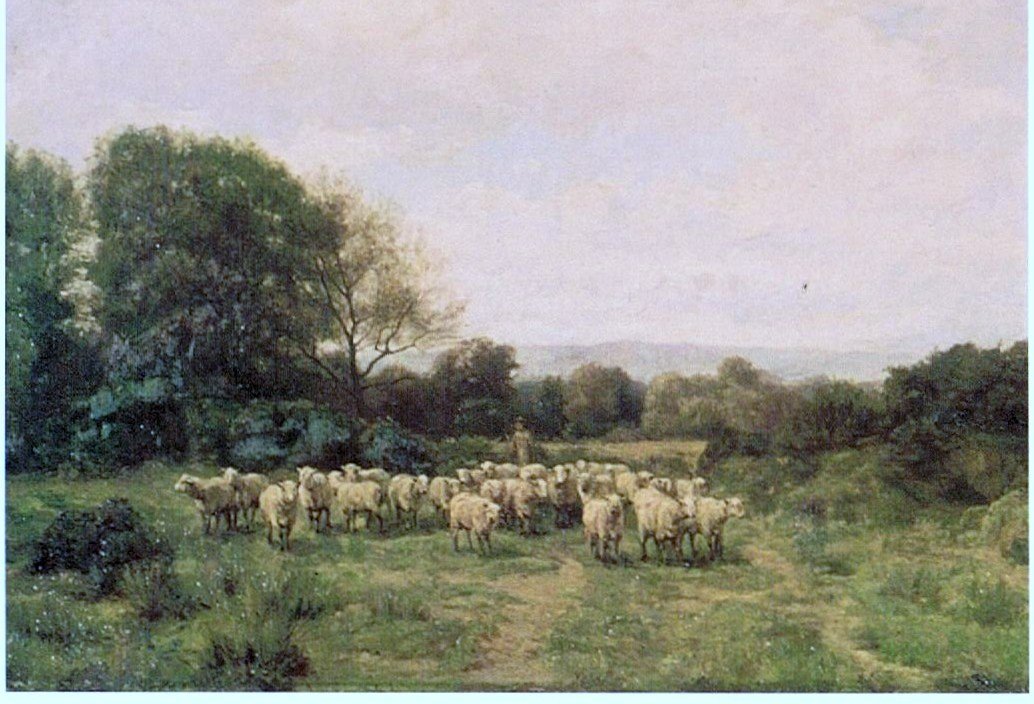
Surrey Pastoral, Manchester Art Gallery

Richard Gay Somerset (1848–1928) was the son of the sub-editor and sometimes art critic of the Old Manchester Courier. He was educated at the School of Art under Mr. Buckley. He enjoyed travelling and made sixteen trips up and down the Mediterranean in coasting steamers. On these journeys he preferred to paint subjects with an archaeological interest. He was also an excellent landscape painter.

Somerset was an eminent member of the Manchester School of Painters, an original member of the Royal Cambrian Academy of Art—becoming its vice-president in 1919—and was one of the oldest members of the Manchester Academy of Fine Arts.

== Bibliography ==
- Susan W Thomson, Manchester's Victorian Art Scene And Its Unrecognised Artists, Manchester Art Press, 2007. ISBN 978-0-9554619-0-3
