= James Renwick (physicist) =

English-American scientist and engineer (1790–1863)

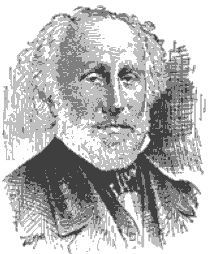
- Born: 30 May 1790; Liverpool, England
- Died: 12 January 1863 (aged 72); New York City, United States
- Education: Columbia College
- Occupations: Scientist, engineer
- Spouse: Margaret Anne Brevoort (m. 1816)
- Children: 4, including James Jr. and Edward

James Renwick (30 May 1790 – 12 January 1863), was an English-American scientist and engineer.

== Early life ==
Renwick was born in Liverpool, England, on 30 May 1790. He was the son of Jane Jeffrey Renwick (1773–1850) and William Renwick (1769–1808). His paternal grandfather was James Renwick (1743–1803).

He graduated from Columbia College in 1807.

== Career ==
In 1820, Columbia appointed Renwick professor of natural philosophy, a position he held until 1854. In 1838, the U.S. government appointed him one of the commissioners to explore the line of the boundary between Maine and New Brunswick, which was settled in 1842 by the Webster-Ashburton Treaty.

In addition to his collegiate duties he wrote biographies of Robert Fulton, David Rittenhouse, and Count Rumford for Sparks's American Biography; a memoir of DeWitt Clinton (1834); and Treatise on the Steam-engine (1830). His textbooks, Outlines of Natural Philosophy (1822), Elements of Mechanics (1832), and First Principles of Chemistry (1840) were among the first works of their kind published in the United States. The first and third of these, along with other educational works of his, passed through multiple editions.

In 1828, Renwick was elected to the American Philosophical Society. In 1863, he was elected an Associate Fellow of the American Academy of Arts and Sciences.

=== Morris Canal ===
Renwick was responsible for the idea and initial design of the inclined planes on the Morris Canal. The design of these planes were later copied for the Elbląg Canal in Poland.

== Personal life ==
Renwick married in 1816 Margaret Anne Brevoort (1791–1868), from a wealthy and socially prominent New York family. Together, they were the parents of:

- Henry Brevoort Renwick (1817–1895), who was a mechanical engineer and inspector of steamboat engines.
- James Renwick Jr. (1818–1895), was a noted Gothic Revival architect, designer of St. Patrick's Cathedral in New York and the Smithsonian Castle in Washington, D.C., among many other buildings.
- Edward S. Renwick (1823–1912), who was a mechanical engineer, inventor and patent expert.
- Laura Renwick (1826–1879).

Renwick died in New York City on 12 January 1863.
