= Ralph Partington =

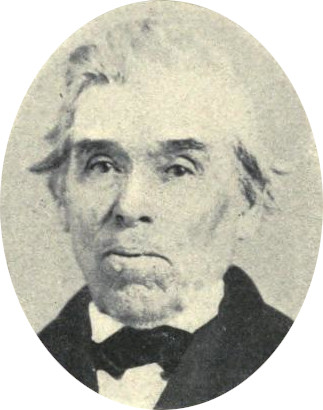
- Born: March 16, 1806; Skippool, England
- Died: March 7, 1873 (aged 66); Salt Lake City, Utah
- Known for: Mormon pioneer, father-in-law of Hugh Findlay

Ralph Partington (March 16, 1806 – March 7, 1873) was a Mormon pioneer.

Partington was born in Skippool, Lancashire, England, and was married to Ann Taylor. Taylor was among the first English women to join the Church of Jesus Christ of Latter Day Saints when she was baptized in the River Ribble in 1837. The couple emigrated to Nauvoo, Illinois, with their four children aboard the ship Swanton in 1843. Ann bore a child en route.

When they landed in Nauvoo, the couple both came down with malaria, which kept them from supporting their family. Neighbors Willard and Jeanetta Richards adopted their eight-year-old daughter Ellen to help ease the burden. She was later sealed as the Richards' daughter in the Nauvoo Temple. Another neighbor took the newborn baby, which soon died. When the couple regained health in 1845, Partington found work as a carpenter and Ann gave birth to another child.

When mobs forced the Mormons from Nauvoo in the winter of 1846, the Partingtons ended up across the river in Montrose, Iowa, with no provisions. Instead of heading west with the main body of Latter Day Saints (including Ellen and the Richards family), they moved to St. Louis where Partington found more carpentry work. While there they had another baby, which died at 5 months.

From St. Louis, Partington sent clothing and shoes to Ellen before she crossed the plains with the Richards family. She married in 1851 at age 16 years and 9 months. By 1853, the Partingtons had enough money to leave for Utah. When they arrived in Salt Lake City, Ellen had an 11-month-old child. Their daughter Catherine married Hugh Findlay.
