= Blanche Partington =

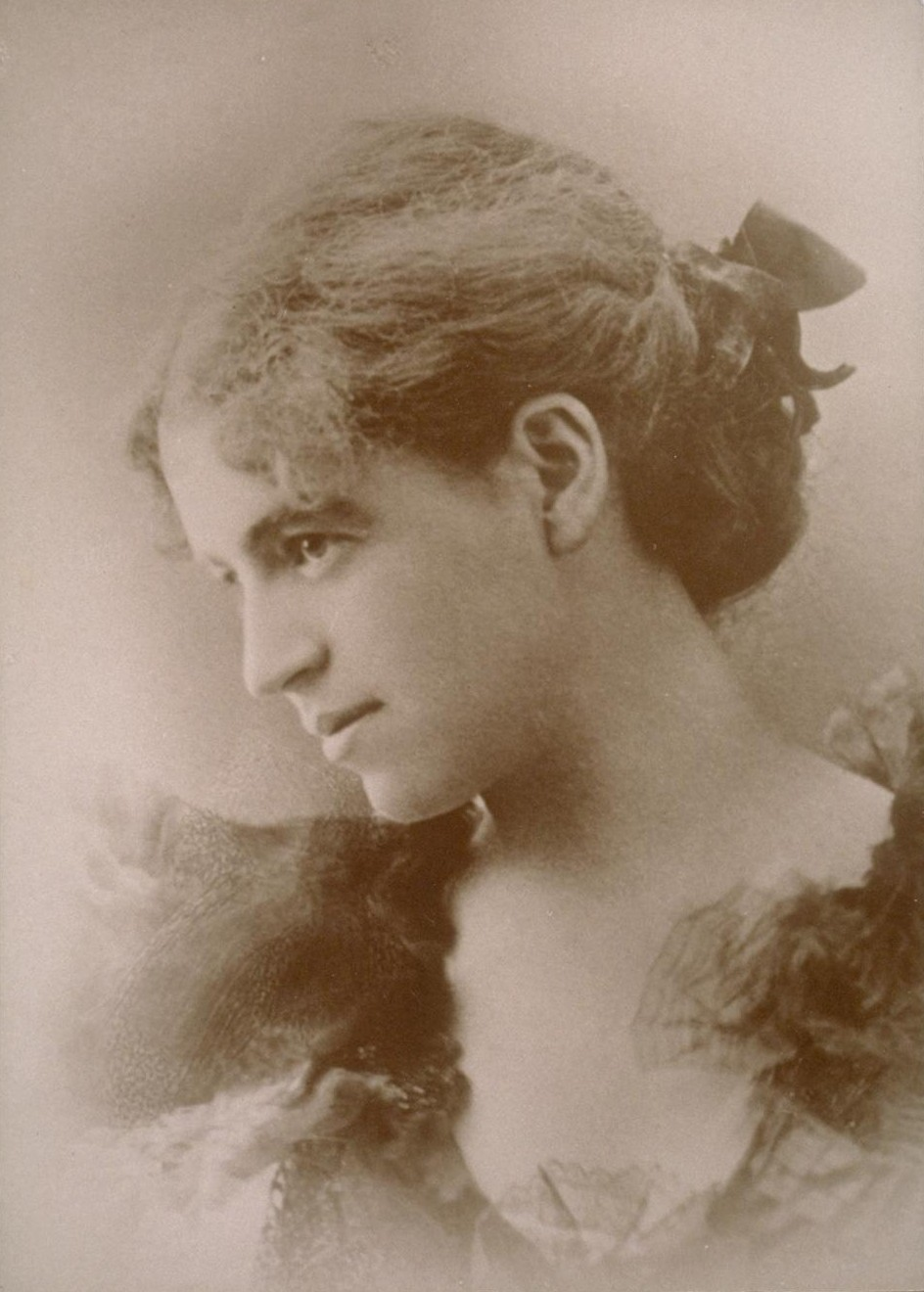
- Blanche Partington, c. 1890
- Born: October 12, 1866; Stockport, Cheshire, England
- Died: March 12, 1951 (aged 84); San Francisco, California, United States
- Occupation: reporter

Blanche Partington (October 12, 1866 – March 12, 1951) was an American journalist and member of the San Francisco Bay Area literary and cultural scene. She is particularly noted for her relationships with prominent California writers, including Ambrose Bierce, Jack London, and Yone Noguchi.

== Early life ==
Blanche Partington was born in Cheshire, England to artist John Herbert Evelyn Partington (1843–99) and his wife, Sarah Mottershead, on October 12, 1866, and christened at St Mary's Church, Stockport on November 25, 1866. Blanche was the eldest of seven children, all of whom would achieve success in careers connected with the arts, among them, artists Richard Langtry Partington and Gertrude Partington Albright as artists, Phyllis Partington (an opera singer under the name Frances Peralta), and theater manager John Allan Partington. The family lived briefly in Heysham, Lancashire, and Ramsey, Isle of Man during the 1880s. "John H. E. Partington was a great lover of travel and moved his family so often that no formal schooling was possible. He solved his children's education by training them himself. After they had learned to read and write, he read them famous poems which they were then asked to recite from memory. As recreation they had music, drawing and painting, offered them in much the modern, progressive method of letting each child's talents unfold."

In 1889, the family moved to the San Francisco Bay Area. John Partington established a studio and art school on Pine Street. Richard and Gertrude were soon working as sketch artists for local newspapers, while Blanche and Phyllis developed their musical talents.

== Ambrose Bierce ==
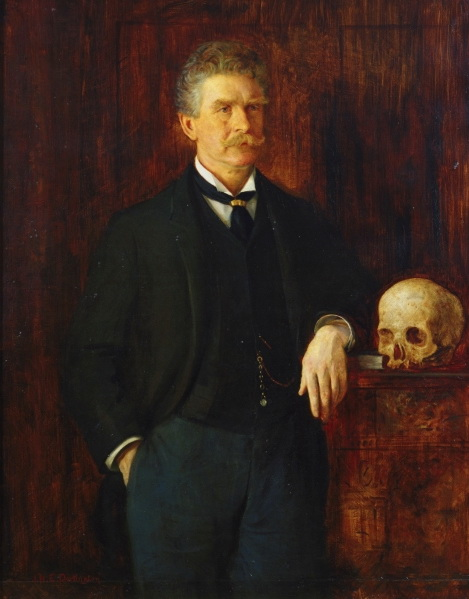
Ambrose Bierce by J. H. E. Partington

In 1892, Blanche, then twenty-six, began an intimate friendship with fifty-one-year-old writer Ambrose Bierce. Blanche became one of the famed humorist's favored correspondents, a position she still retained at the time of his mysterious disappearance in 1914. It is generally assumed among Bierce scholars that the two were lovers, but it is clear from Bierce's early letters, during the summer of 1892, that Blanche looked to Bierce for instruction about a possible career in journalism. "When you are quite sure of the nature of your call to write--quite sure that it is not the voice of 'duty'--then let me do you such slight, poor service as my limitations and the injunctions of circumstance permit."

== Yone Noguchi ==
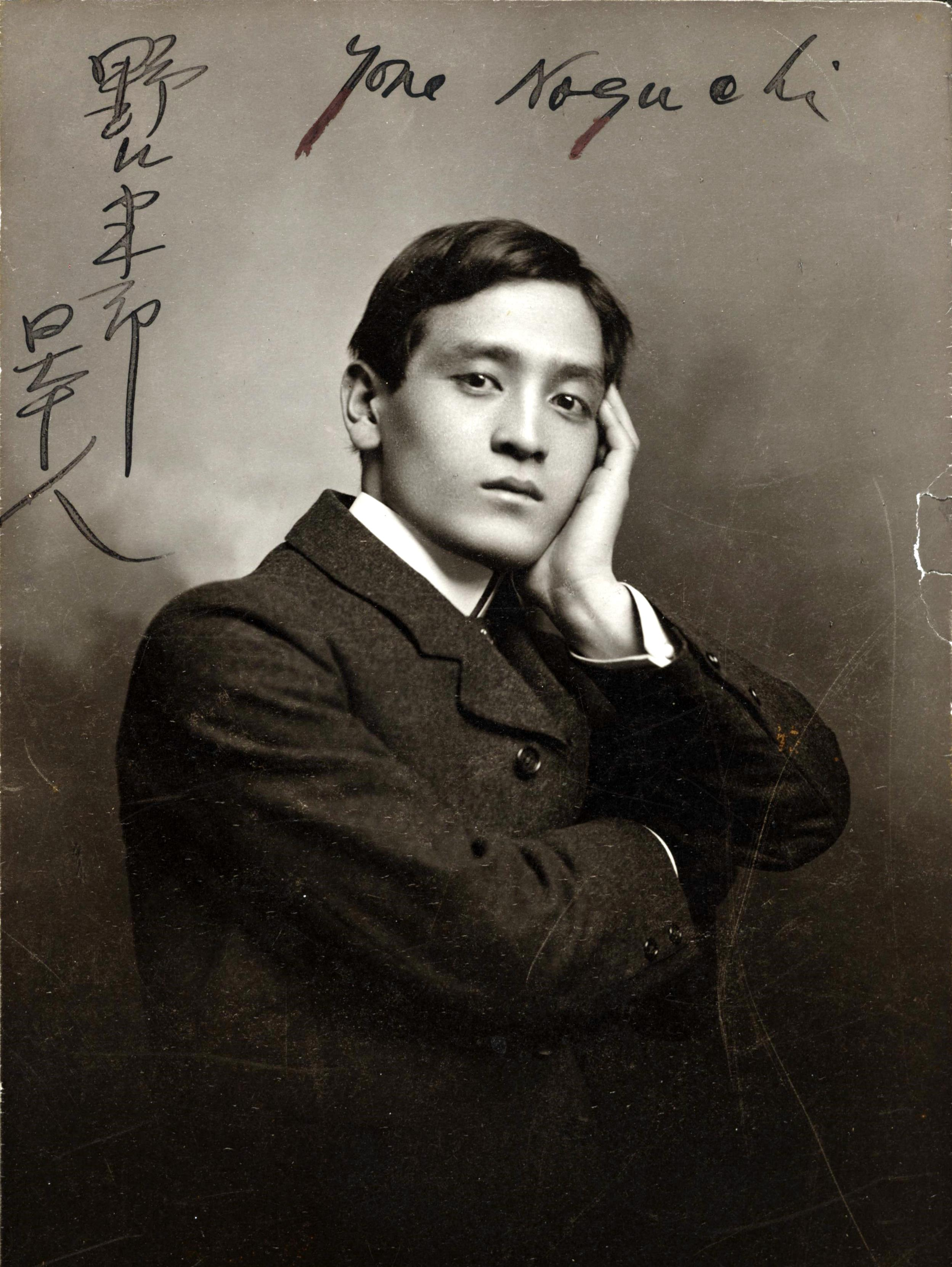
Yone Noguchi, 1903

In October 1898, Partington began a friendship with the Japanese poet Yone Noguchi. This time, Partington played the role of teacher and Noguchi the student. "I think that you are so bright and full of good judgements," Noguchi wrote after they met through a mutual friend, Joaquin Miller. "I am such a writer without good grammer and spelling. How I wish to know and have a fine adviser and 'sympatica'!" Partington helped Noguchi with his literary work, including an early version of The American Diary of a Japanese Girl. But their relationship was under strain by the time Noguchi left California in 1900.

== Journalism ==
Partington's early years in journalism are still somewhat obscure. The death of her father, John Partington, in January 1899 may have acted as a stimulus. On March 18, 1900, the San Francisco Chronicle published her interview with Swami Vivekananda. By November 1900, she was writing regular drama and music reviews for the San Francisco Call. She served as the paper's official dramatic critic until the 1906 San Francisco earthquake. Her main contribution was a regular Sunday column entitled "With the Players and the Music Folk," filled with assorted entertainment news, gossip, and interviews with local and visiting entertainers. In these columns and their midweek supplements Partington developed a casual interview style which foregrounded her easy camaraderie with the entertainers.

== Jack London ==
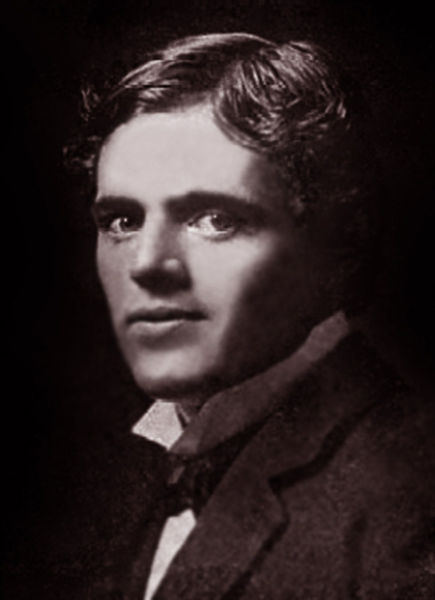
Jack London

By 1902, Blanche had become friendly with another important Bay Area writer, Jack London. She soon became rivals for London's affections with London's future wife, Charmian Kittredge. Charmian, in her memoir, writes of their battle for London's musical tastes. "At that time he cared far more for orchestral than for vocal harmonies, especially the Wagnerian operas. In the latter, as well as in quite a repertory of other operatic work, he had been well coached by his friend Blanche Partington, musical and dramatic critic on the San Francisco Call for seven years, who had taken him with her to many performances. I, on the other hand, favored the voice records above the instrumental. After several years, as one manifestation of his searching into the human, Jack leaned more and more to the voice, until he seldom put on the orchestral disks."

== Christian Science ==
Partington's 1951 obituary notes that "More than 30 years ago she entered the practice of Christian Science and until her death maintained offices at 166 Geary Street." Her interest in Christian Science began considerably earlier, perhaps in connection with her mother's supposed recovery from cancer in 1907. "Not that I believe a word of it," Bierce told George Sterling. Charmian London recalled a "warm discussion" between Partington and Jack London on the subject of Christian Science in 1911.

== Later years ==
After San Francisco's musical and dramatic scene collapsed in the 1906 quake, Partington did not return to her journalistic work at the San Francisco Call, and her later years, though she remained a part of the Bay Area's shrinking cultural milieu, were spent in semi-retirement. Partington was the last to receive a letter from Ambrose Bierce before his mysterious disappearance in Mexico in 1914. Jack London died in 1916.

Blanche Partington never married. On March 12, 1951, at the age of 84, she died at the family home overlooking San Francisco's Buena Vista Park.
