= Amnesty International Ghana =

Section of the Amnesty International network

- Official logo of Amnesty Ghana
- Founded: 1973
- Type: NGO
- Purpose: humanitarian, activism, lobbying
- Headquarters: Accra, Ghana
- Services: Protecting human rights, Campaigning, Education.
- Fields: Media-attention, direct-appeal campaigns, mobilization
- Members: Approximately 10,000
- Official language: English
- Current Director: Genevieve Partington
- Affiliations: Amnesty International

Amnesty International Ghana (also known as AI Ghana) is a section of the Amnesty International network and is part of the global movement focused on the defending and protecting human rights. The non-governmental organisation focuses on the protection of human rights in Ghana through undertakes advocacy and campaigns to persuade the powers that be.

== Campaigns ==
Amnesty Ghana works in cooperation with government, private organisations and independent bodies, and conducts various activities to promote understanding and protection of human rights. It has raised concerns around unfair trials and poor prison conditions for people on death row, the shackling of people with psychosocial disabilities and the continued discrimination, violence and police harassment to LGBTI people. Amnesty Ghana's high-profile campaigns also include seeking justice for the murdered undercover agent Ahmed Hussein-Suale in January 2019.

In February 2018, Amnesty International Ghana launched its annual report. Within the report it urged the Ghana government fully implement the Mental Health Act 2012 and called for improvement of funding allocation to mental health services in the country. It also presents various reports calling for an end to the human rights abuses, an end to death penalty, and a better justice system and an uphold of the rights LGBTI people in Ghana.

== Organizational structure ==
AI Ghana is headed by an executive board composed of 5 people elected by the members at a general assembly.

== Support ==
AI Ghana has over 10,000 members and financial supporters across Ghana. The organisation is impartial and independent of any political ideologies, economic interests or religions, and as such does not accept any money from governments or political parties. It has also partnered with the Amnesty International, US Embassy of Ghana, Human Rights Watch and United Nations Human Rights. It is located in Kokomlemle District, Accra.

== See also ==
- Amnesty International
- Human rights in Thailand
- Censorship in Thailand
- Criticism of Amnesty International
- Human Rights Watch
