= Fish Haven, Idaho =

Unincorporated community in the state of Idaho, United States

Fish Haven
- Unincorporated community
- Location within the state of Idaho
- Coordinates: 42°2′12.75″N 111°23′46.74″W
- Country: United States
- State: Idaho
- County: Bear Lake
- Elevation: 5,924 ft (1,806 m)
- Time zone: UTC-7 (Mountain (MST))
  - Summer (DST): UTC-6 (MDT)
- ZIP code: 83287
- Area codes: 208, 986

Fish Haven, originally named Rush Creek, is an unincorporated community along the shores of Bear Lake in Bear Lake County, Idaho, United States. It is 4 km (2.5 miles) north of the Utah border.

== History ==
The first settlement at Fish Haven was made in 1864. A post office called Fish Haven was established in 1867, and remained in operation until 1962. The community was so named because nearby Bear Lake is a favorite fishing spot.

Fish Haven's population was estimated at 100 in 1909, and was 130 in 1960.
