= Henry Howell (Mormon) =

- Born: March 6, 1828; Essex, England, United Kingdom of Great Britain and Ireland
- Died: November 24, 1896 (aged 68); Fish Haven, Idaho, United States
- Spouse: Frances Goble (m. 1855)

Henry Howell (March 6, 1828 – November 24, 1896) was a Mormon pioneer and one of the founders of Fish Haven, Idaho, US.

== Biography ==
Howell was born in Essex, England. He married 27-year-old Frances Goble in 1855, one month before emigrating to the United States where he settled in Philadelphia for five years. In 1860 Howell crossed the plains to Salt Lake City. In 1864, he helped pioneer Bear Lake County, Idaho, where he first helped settle Paris and then Fish Haven, Idaho. Unlike some other Mormons at the time, Howell did not practice plural marriage. He died at Fish Haven.
