= Byron Fija =

Okinawan-language educator (born 1969)

- Born: 1 September 1969 (age 57); Naha, Okinawa, USCAR
- Occupations: Okinawan-language educator and promoter

Byron Fija (Okinawan: 比嘉 光龍, romanized: Fija Bairon; born 1 September 1969 in Naha) is an Okinawan-language educator and promoter. He hosts an Okinawan-language radio program and is often featured on Japanese television to teach the language.

== Early life ==
Fija was born on 1 September 1969 in Naha to an Okinawan mother and an American father. He was left with an uncle and aunt soon after birth. He grew up in his native Okinawa and was bullied as a child by his classmates, who called him "America" because of his appearance. At the age of 22, he travelled to the United States but found life there to be equally as troublesome, because locals assumed he could speak English because of his appearance. After returning to Okinawa at age 24, he stayed at an old-style inn where he heard Okinawan folk music being sung. Inspired by the performance, Fija decided to learn the Okinawan language and promote Okinawan culture and identity. Fija now identifies as "American-Uchinanchu" (American-Okinawan).

== Education and practice ==
At the time of Fija's youth, there were no classes or institutions teaching the Okinawan language. Consequently, Fija learned Okinawan by talking to elderly locals who could still speak the language. His main teacher was a famous stage actor, Makishi Kochu (1923–2011), whom he visited every week to learn from.

Fija began teaching Okinawan after mastering the language. For years he has hosted a radio program which he conducts entirely in Okinawan and other Ryukyuan languages. Local residents, almost all elderly, call in to request songs and to chat. He has also appeared on television shows with the sponsorship of the Naha city government to teach locals the Okinawan language.

Fija is an outspoken advocate for more native language practice in daily life and encourages people in Okinawa to learn Okinawan. As one of the few fluent speakers of the language, he is frequently contacted by domestic and international media and regularly attends national and international events on the matter of Ryukyuan languages or endangered languages in general.

A video featuring Fija singing Okinawan folk songs in the Okinawan language is included in a collection at the Ethnological Museum Berlin compiled by the Okinawan artist Yuken Teruya as part of a new collection telling Okinawan history up to the present day.
