= Okinawan language =

Northern Ryukyuan language

Okinawan
- 沖縄口; ウチナーグチ; Uchinaaguchi/Uchināguchi
- Pronunciation: [ʔut͡ɕinaːɡut͡ɕi]
- Native to: Japan
- Region: Southern Okinawa Islands
- Native speakers: 1.2 million (2020)
- Language family: Japonic: Ryukyuan; Northern; Okinawan
- Writing system: Japanese; Okinawan

Language codes
- ISO 639-3: ryu
- Glottolog: cent2126
- ELP: South-Central Okinawan
- Linguasphere: 45-CAC-ai; 45-CAC-aj; 45-CAC-ak
- Northern Okinawan or Kunigami South–Central Okinawan or Shuri–Naha

Okinawan (沖縄口, ウチナーグチ, Uchinaaguchi, [ʔut͡ɕinaːɡut͡ɕi]), or more precisely Central Okinawan, is a Northern Ryukyuan language spoken primarily in the southern half of the island of Okinawa, as well as in the surrounding islands of Kerama, Kumejima, Tonaki, Aguni and a number of smaller peripheral islands. Central Okinawan distinguishes itself from the speech of Northern Okinawa, which is classified independently as the Kunigami language. Both languages are listed by UNESCO as endangered.

Though Okinawan encompasses a number of local dialects, the Shuri–Naha variant is generally recognized as the de facto standard, as it had been used as the official language of the Ryukyu Kingdom since the reign of King Shō Shin (1477–1526). Moreover, as the former capital of Shuri was built around the royal palace, the language used by the royal court became the regional and literary standard, which thus flourished in songs and poems written during that era.

Today, most Okinawans speak Okinawan Japanese, although a number of people still speak the Okinawan language, most often the elderly. Within Japan, Okinawan is often not seen as a language unto itself but is referred to as the Okinawan dialect (沖縄方言, Okinawa hōgen), or more specifically the Central and Southern Okinawan dialects (沖縄中南部諸方言, Okinawa Chūnanbu Sho hōgen). Okinawan speakers are undergoing language shift as they switch to Japanese, since language use in Okinawa today is far from stable. Okinawans are assimilating and accenting standard Japanese due to the similarity of the two languages, the standardized and centralized education system, the media, business and social contact with mainlanders and previous attempts from Japan to suppress the native languages, similar to policies historically seen in regions such as Tohoku region and main land Kyushu region. Okinawan is still kept alive in popular music, tourist shows and in theaters featuring a local drama called uchinā shibai, which depict local customs and manners.

== History ==
=== Pre-Ryukyu Kingdom ===
Okinawan is a Japonic language, derived from Proto-Japonic and is therefore related to Japanese. The split between Old Japanese and the Ryukyuan languages has been estimated to have occurred as early as the 1st century AD to as late as the 12th century AD. Chinese and Japanese characters were first introduced by a Japanese missionary in 1265.

=== Ryukyu Kingdom era ===
==== Pre-Satsuma ====
Hiragana was a much more popular writing system than kanji; thus, Okinawan poems were commonly written solely in hiragana or with little kanji. Okinawan became the official language under King Shō Shin. The Omoro Sōshi, a compilation of ancient Ryukyuan poems, was written in an early form of Okinawan, known as Old Okinawan.

==== Post-Satsuma to annexation ====
In 1609, the Ryukyu Kingdom came under the control of the Satsuma Domain and consequently came under even stronger influence from Kyushu dialects. As part of its policies, the Satsuma Domain required the use of kanji in Ryukyu, and kanji also came to play a more important role in poetry. In addition, official documents in Ryukyu came to be written in Classical Chinese, as in Japan. During this period, the Ryukyuan language gradually developed into modern Okinawan.

=== Japanese annexation to end of World War II ===
Language shift to Japanese in Ryukyu/Okinawa began in 1879 when the Japanese government annexed Ryukyu and established Okinawa Prefecture. The prefectural office mainly consisted of people from Kagoshima Prefecture where the Satsuma Domain used to be. This caused the modernization of Okinawa as well as language shift to Japanese. As a result, Japanese became the standard language for administration, education, media, and literature.

In 1902, the National Language Research Council (国語調査委員会) began the linguistic unification of Japan to Standard Japanese. This caused the linguistic stigmatization of many local varieties in Japan including Okinawan. This policy of integration into Standard Japanese was implemented throughout Japan. In regions such as Satsuma and Hyūga, the Tōhoku region, and Okinawa,"dialect tags" (hōgen-fuda) were used to punish those who spoke local dialects. Even in the Kantō region, dialect suppression education was carried out in Kanagawa under what was called the "Ne-Sa-Yo Movement," in which students who spoke dialects were forced to stand in the hallway, and papers containing dialect expressions were burned collectively. As the discrimination accelerated, Okinawans themselves started to abandon their languages and shifted to Standard Japanese.

==== American occupation ====
Under American administration, there was an attempt to revive and standardize Okinawan, but this proved difficult and was shelved in favor of Japanese. General Douglas MacArthur attempted to promote Okinawan languages and culture through education.

=== Return to Japan to present day ===
After Okinawa's reversion to Japanese sovereignty, Japanese continued to be the dominant language used, and the majority of the youngest generations only speak Japanese. There have been attempts to revive Okinawan by notable people such as Byron Fija and Seijin Noborikawa, but few native Okinawans know the language.

=== Outside of Japan ===
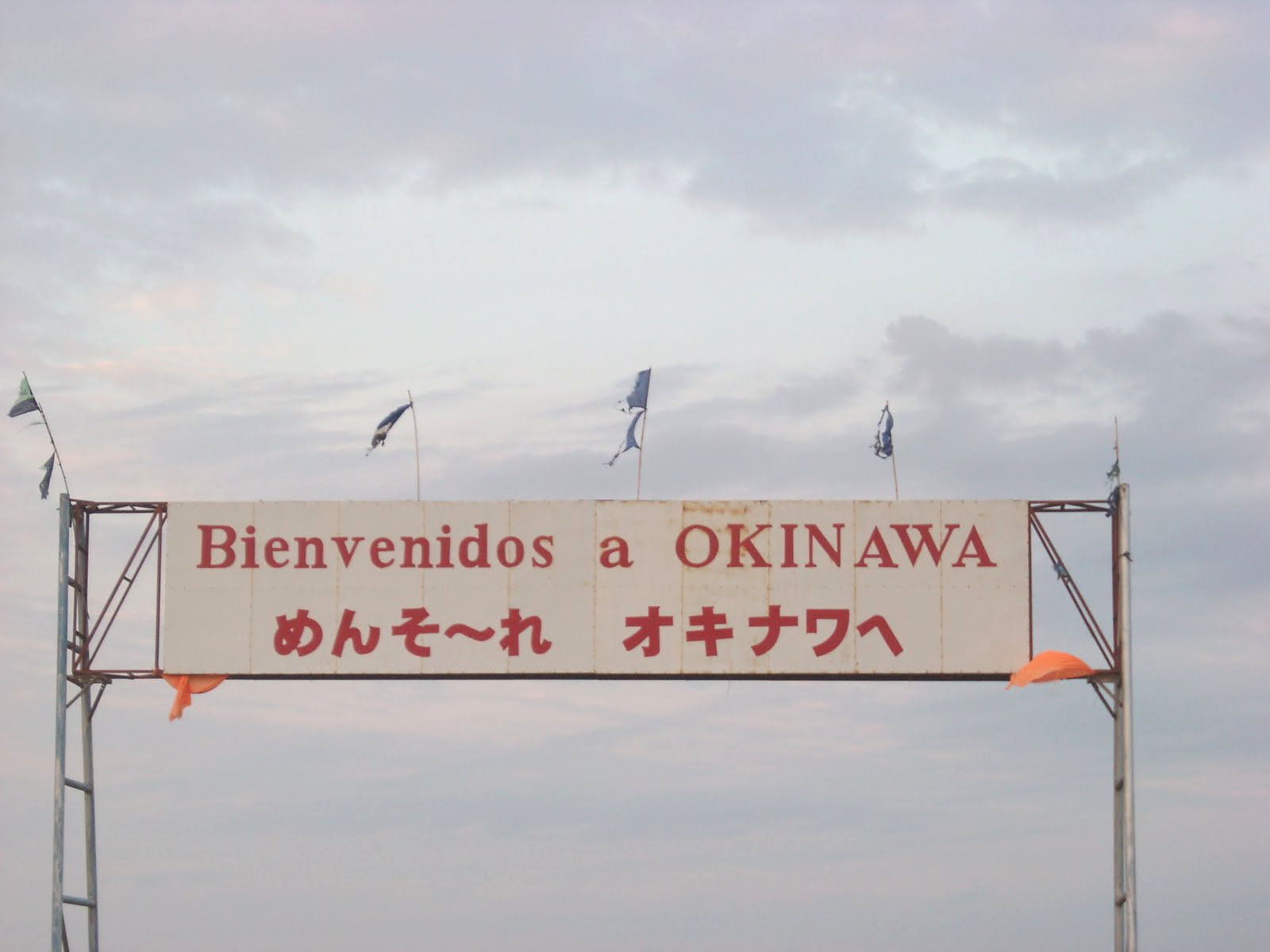
Sign in Okinawa Uno (a colonia in Bolivia), in Spanish and Okinawan: the text reads めんそ〜れ オキナワへ, Menso~re Okinawa-e.

The Okinawan language is still spoken by communities of Okinawan immigrants in Brazil. The first immigrants from the island of Okinawa to Brazil landed in the Port of Santos in 1908 drawn by the hint of work and farmable land. Currently the Okinawan-Japanese centers and communities in the State of São Paulo are a world reference to this language helping it to stay alive. Courses in Okinawan language and literature are offered at the University of Hawaiʻi at Mānoa and books in Uchinaaguchi have been published in Hawaii.

== Classification ==
Okinawan is sometimes grouped with Kunigami as the Okinawan languages; however, not all linguists accept this grouping, some claiming that Kunigami is a dialect of Okinawan. Okinawan is also grouped with Amami (or the Amami languages) as the Northern Ryukyuan languages.

=== Dialect or language ===
There is ongoing debate over whether the Ryukyuan languages should be regarded as dialects of Japanese or as independent languages. Mutual intelligibility between Okinawan and Standard Japanese is often difficult, and this has been cited as grounds for considering Ryukyuan an independent language. On the other hand, it has also been pointed out that linguistic differences between regions and social classes within Japan were historically extremely large, and that mutual unintelligibility alone cannot serve as a definitive criterion for distinguishing a language from a dialect.

During the Edo period, regional linguistic variation is said to have been even greater than it is today. In the first volume of Shikitei Sanba's Kyōgen Inaka Ayatsuri (1811), it is stated that speech would already differ only 20 chō (about 2 kilometers) outside Edo, and that at a distance of one ri (about 3.9 kilometers), the language would become entirely different from that of Edo. In addition, linguistic differences existed not only between regions but also between social classes, such as the speech of the Yamanote elite, court nobles, and the downtown commoners. Interpreters were reportedly not uncommon between regions. For this reason, there are limits to using "whether people can understand one another" as an absolute criterion for distinguishing a language from a dialect.

Within Japanese and Okinawan linguistics, several terms have been used to refer to the speech of Okinawa, including "Ryukyuan language," "Ryukyuan dialect," and "Okinawan dialect." At present, the term "dialect" is the more commonly used designation. Consequently, the term "Ryukyuan language" is not necessarily familiar to the general public. The linguist Ferdinand de Saussure stated that "it is difficult to determine where the difference between a language and a dialect lies. Even a dialect may be called a language if literature is written in it." Likewise, the linguist Katsuhiko Tanaka argued that whether a form of speech is considered an independent language or a dialect subordinate to another language is determined by the political circumstances and aspirations of its speakers, and cannot be decided unequivocally through natural-scientific objectivism.

The Ryukyus possess an indigenous literary tradition, including works such as the Omoro Sōshi, and from this perspective there are positions that regard Ryukyuan as an independent language. On the other hand, the peoples of Japan and Okinawa shared the Jōmon cultural sphere in ancient times, are believed to possess a common ancestral language and genetic connections, and Okinawa has historically been incorporated into the Japanese state for more than 500 years since the medieval period. Furthermore, within Okinawan society itself, the recognition of these speech forms as "dialects" is widespread. For these reasons, many researchers continue to use the term "Okinawan dialect."

Thus, whether Ryukyuan should be classified as a "language" or a "dialect" is not merely a linguistic question, but one deeply connected to history, politics, culture, and identity.

=== Dialects of the Ryukyuan language ===
Okinawan linguist Seizen Nakasone states that the Ryukyuan languages are in fact groupings of similar dialects. As each community has its own distinct dialect, there is no "one language". Nakasone attributes this diversity to the isolation caused by immobility, citing the story of his mother who wanted to visit the town of Nago but never made the 25km trip before she died of old age.

The contemporary dialects in Ryukyuan language are divided into three large groups: Amami-Okinawa dialects, Miyako-Yaeyama dialects, and the Yonaguni dialect. All of them are mutually unintelligible. Amami is located in the Kagoshima prefecture but it belongs to the Ryukyuan group linguistically. The Yonaguni dialect is very different in phonetics from the other groups but it comes closest to the Yaeyama dialect lexically.

== Sociolinguistics ==
UNESCO listed six Okinawan language varieties as endangered languages in 2009. The endangerment of Okinawan is largely due to the shift to Standard Japanese. Throughout history, Okinawan languages have been treated as dialects of Standard Japanese. For instance, in the 20th century, many schools used "dialect tags" to punish the students who spoke in Okinawan. Consequently, many of the remaining speakers today are choosing not to transmit their languages to younger generations due to the stigmatization of the languages in the past.

There have been several revitalization efforts made to reverse this language shift. However, Okinawan is still poorly taught in formal institutions due to the lack of support from the Okinawan Education Council: education in Okinawa is conducted exclusively in Japanese, and children do not study Okinawan as their second language at school. As a result, at least two generations of Okinawans have grown up without any proficiency in their local languages both at home and school.

Okinawan language is 71% lexically similar to, or cognate with, standard Japanese. Even the southernmost Japanese dialect (Kagoshima dialect) is only 72% cognate with the northernmost Ryukyuan language (Amami). The Kagoshima dialect of Japanese, however, is 74% lexically similar to Standard Japanese.

== Phonology ==
=== Vowels ===
	Front	Central	Back
Close	i iː		u uː
Close-Mid	e eː		o oː
Open		a aː	

The Okinawan language has five vowels, all of which may be long or short, though the short vowels /e/ and /o/ are quite rare, as they occur only in a few native Okinawan words with heavy syllables with the pattern /Ceɴ/ or /Coɴ/, such as /meɴsoːɾeː/ mensōrē "welcome" and /toɴɸaː/ tonfā. The close back vowels /u/ and /uː/ are truly rounded, rather than the compressed vowels of standard Japanese.

=== Pitch accent ===
Pitch accent varies greatly between dialects. In Shuri dialect, there are two word tones, which are lexically determined: flat (accentless) and falling (accented). The scope of the accent is the word plus an attached grammatical particle. Accentless words are high tone throughout, whereas accented words have a drop in pitch after the second mora (or after the first in bimoraic words).

The difference can be illustrated with:

- [háná] 'flower', nominative [hánánú]
- [hánà] 'nose', nominative [hánánù]

and

- [ɸíí] 'fire', nominative [ɸíínú]
- [ɸíì] 'day', nominative [ɸíínù]

=== Consonants ===
The Okinawan language counts some 20 distinctive segments shown in the chart below, with major allophones presented in parentheses.

IPA chart of Okinawan consonants
	Labial	Alveolar	Alveolo- palatal	Palatal	Labio- velar	Velar	Uvular/ Glottal
Nasal	m	n				(ŋ)	(ɴ)
Plosive	p b	t d	t͡ɕ d͡ʑ		kʷ ɡʷ	k ɡ	ʔ
Fricative	ɸ	s (z)	(ɕ)	(ç)			h
Flap		ɾ					
Approximant				j	w		

The only consonant that can occur as a syllable coda is the archiphoneme |n|. Many analyses treat it as an additional phoneme /N/, the moraic nasal, though it never contrasts with /n/ or /m/.

The consonant system of the Okinawan language is fairly similar to that of standard Japanese, but it does present a few differences on the phonemic and allophonic level. Namely, Okinawan retains the labialized consonants /kʷ/ and /ɡʷ/ which were lost in Late Middle Japanese (though they are retained in a handful of Modern Japanese dialects), possesses a glottal stop /ʔ/, features a voiceless bilabial fricative /ɸ/ distinct from the aspirate /h/, and has two distinctive affricates which arose from a number of different sound processes. Additionally, Okinawan lacks the major allophones [t͡s] and [d͡z] found in Japanese, having historically fronted the vowel /u/ to /i/ after the alveolars /t d s z/, consequently merging [t͡su] tsu into [t͡ɕi] chi, [su] su into [ɕi] shi, and both [d͡zu] dzu and [zu] zu into [d͡ʑi] ji. It also lacks /z/ as a distinctive phoneme, having merged it into /d͡ʑ/.

==== Bilabial and glottal fricatives ====
The bilabial fricative /ɸ/ has sometimes been transcribed as the cluster /hw/, since, like Japanese, /h/ allophonically labializes into [ɸ] before the high vowel /u/, and /ɸ/ does not occur before the rounded vowel /o/. This suggests that an overlap between /ɸ/ and /h/ exists, and so the contrast in front of other vowels can be denoted through labialization. However, this analysis fails to take account of the fact that Okinawan has not fully undergone the diachronic change */p/ → /ɸ/ → */h/ as in Japanese, and that the suggested clusterization and labialization into */hw/ is unmotivated. Consequently, the existence of /ɸ/ must be regarded as independent of /h/, even though the two overlap. Barring a few words that resulted from the former change, the aspirate /h/ also arose from the odd lenition of /k/ and /s/, as well as words loaned from other dialects. Before the glide /j/ and the high vowel /i/, it is pronounced closer to [ç], as in Japanese.

==== Palatalization ====
The plosive consonants /t/ and /k/ historically palatalized and affricated into /t͡ɕ/ before and occasionally following the glide /j/ and the high vowel /i/: */kiri/ → /t͡ɕiɾi/ chiri "fog", and */k(i)jora/ → /t͡ɕuɾa/ chura- "beautiful". This change preceded vowel raising, so that instances where /i/ arose from */e/ did not trigger palatalization: */ke/ → /kiː/ kī "hair". Their voiced counterparts /d/ and /ɡ/ underwent the same effect, becoming /d͡ʑ/ under such conditions: */unaɡi/ → /ʔɴnad͡ʑi/ qnnaji "eel", and */nokoɡiri/ → /nukud͡ʑiɾi/ nukujiri "saw"; but */kaɡeɴ/ → /kaɡiɴ/ kagin "seasoning".

Both /t/ and /d/ may or may not also allophonically affricate before the mid vowel /e/, though this pronunciation is increasingly rare. Similarly, the fricative consonant /s/ palatalizes into [ɕ] before the glide /j/ and the vowel /i/, including when /i/ historically derives from /e/: */sekai/ → [ɕikeː] shikē "world". It may also palatalize before the vowel /e/, especially so in the context of topicalization: [duɕi] dushi → [duɕeː] dusē or dushē "(topic) friend".

In general, sequences containing the palatal consonant /j/ are relatively rare and tend to exhibit depalatalization. For example, /mj/ tends to merge with /n/ ([mjaːku] myāku → [naːku] nāku "Miyako"); */rj/ has merged into /ɾ/ and /d/ (*/rjuː/ → /ɾuː/ rū ~ /duː/ dū "dragon"); and /sj/ has mostly become /s/ (/sjui/ shui → /sui/ sui "Shuri").

==== Flapping and fortition ====
The voiced plosive /d/ and the flap /ɾ/ tend to merge, with the first becoming a flap in word-medial position, and the second sometimes becoming a plosive in word-initial position. For example, /ɾuː/ rū "dragon" may be strengthened into [duː] dū, and /hasidu/ hashidu "door" conversely flaps into [hasiɾu] hashiru. The two sounds do, however, still remain distinct in a number of words and verbal constructions.

==== Glottal stop ====
Okinawan also features a distinctive glottal stop /ʔ/ that historically arose from a process of glottalization of word-initial vowels. Hence, all vowels in Okinawan are predictably glottalized at the beginning of words (*/ame/ → /ʔami/ ami "rain"), save for a few exceptions. High vowel loss or assimilation following this process created a contrast with glottalized approximants and nasal consonants. Compare */uwa/ → /ʔwa/ qwa "pig" to /wa/ wa "I", or */ine/ → /ʔɴni/ qnni "rice plant" to */mune/ → /ɴni/ nni "chest".

==== Moraic nasal ====
The moraic nasal /N/ has been posited in most descriptions of Okinawan phonology. Like Japanese, /N/ (transcribed using the small capital /ɴ/) occupies a full mora and its precise place of articulation will vary depending on the following consonant. Before other labial consonants, it will be pronounced closer to a syllabic bilabial nasal [m̩], as in /ʔɴma/ [ʔm̩ma] qnma "horse". Before velar and labiovelar consonants, it will be pronounced as a syllabic velar nasal [ŋ̍], as in /biɴɡata/ [biŋ̍ɡata] bingata, a method of dying clothes. And before alveolar and alveolo-palatal consonants, it becomes a syllabic alveolar nasal /n̩/, as in /kaɴda/ [kan̩da] kanda "vine". In some varieties, it instead becomes a syllabic uvular nasal [ɴ̩]. Elsewhere, its exact realization remains unspecified, and it may vary depending on the first sound of the next word or morpheme. In isolation and at the end of utterances, it is realized as a velar nasal [ŋ̍].

=== Correspondences with Japanese ===
Correspondences between Japanese and Okinawan
Japanese	Okinawan	Notes
/e/	/iː/	
/i/	/iː/	
/a/	/a/	
/o/	/u/	
/u/	/u/	
/ai/	/eː/	
/ae/	/eː/	
/au/	/oː/	
/ao/	/oː/	
/aja/	/oː/	
/k/	/k/	/ɡ/ also occurs
/ka/	/ka/	/ha/ also occurs
/ki/	/t͡ɕi/	[t͡ɕi]
/ku/	/ku/	/hu/, [ɸu] also occurs
/si/	/si/	/hi/, [çi] also occurs
/su/	/si/	[ɕi]; formerly distinguished as [si] /hi/ [çi] also occurs
/tu/	/t͡ɕi/	[t͡ɕi]; formerly distinguished as [t͡si]
/da/	/ra/	[d] and [ɾ] have merged
/de/	/ri/	[d] and [ɾ] have merged
/do/	/ru/	[d] and [ɾ] have merged
/ni/	/ni/	Moraic /ɴ/ also occurs
/nu/	/nu/	Moraic /ɴ/ also occurs
/ha/	/ɸa/ ~ /ha/	/pa/ also occurs, but rarely
/hi/	/pi/ ~ /hi/	
/he/	/pi/ ~ /hi/	
/mi/	/mi/	Moraic /ɴ/ also occurs
/mu/	/mu/	Moraic /ɴ/ also occurs
/ri/	/i/	/iri/ is unaffected
/wa/	/wa/	Tends to become /a/ medially

== Orthography ==
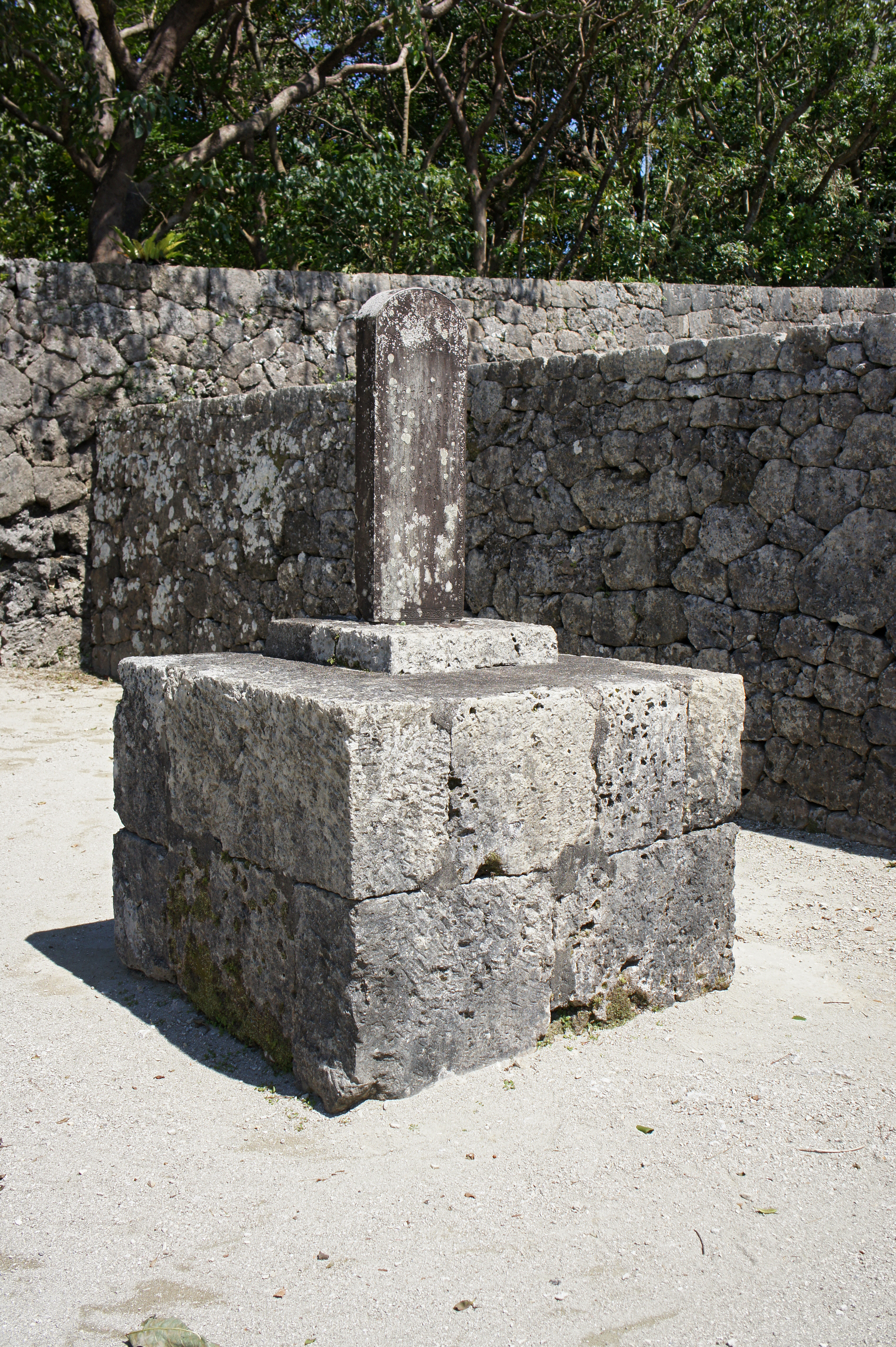
The Tamaoton no Hinomon (玉陵の碑文), referred to as the Tamaudun no Hinomon in modern Japanese, is the oldest known inscription of Okinawan using both hiragana and kanji.

The Okinawan language was historically written using an admixture of kanji and hiragana. The traditional script of Okinawa is called 古文書. Before the Satsuma Invasion in 1609, Man'yōgana (万葉仮名) was used like in Japanese. The hiragana syllabary is believed to have first been introduced from mainland Japan to the Ryukyu Kingdom some time during the reign of king Shunten in the early thirteenth century. It is likely that Okinawans were already in contact with hanzi (Chinese characters) due to extensive trade between the Ryukyu Kingdom and China, Japan and Korea. However, hiragana gained more widespread acceptance throughout the Ryukyu Islands, and most documents and letters were exclusively transcribed using this script, in contrast to in Japan where writing solely in hiragana was considered "women's script". The Omoro Sōshi (おもろさうし), a sixteenth-century compilation of songs and poetry, and a few preserved writs of appointments dating from the same century were written solely in Hiragana. Kanji were gradually adopted due to the growing influence of mainland Japan and to the linguistic affinity between the Okinawan and Japanese languages. However, it was mainly limited to affairs of high importance and to documents sent towards the mainland. The oldest inscription of Okinawan exemplifying its use along with Hiragana can be found on a stone stele at the Tamaudun mausoleum, dating back to 1501.

After the invasion of Okinawa by the Shimazu clan of Satsuma in 1609, Okinawan ceased to be used in official affairs. It was replaced by standard Japanese writing and a form of Classical Chinese writing known as kanbun. Despite this change, Okinawan still continued to prosper in local literature up until the nineteenth century. Following the Meiji Restoration, the Japanese government abolished the domain system and formally annexed the Ryukyu Islands to Japan as the Okinawa Prefecture in 1879. To promote national unity, the government then introduced standard education and opened Japanese-language schools based on the Tokyo dialect. Students were discouraged and chastised for speaking or even writing in the local "dialect", notably through the use of "dialect cards" (方言札). As a result, Okinawan gradually ceased to be written entirely until the American takeover in 1945.

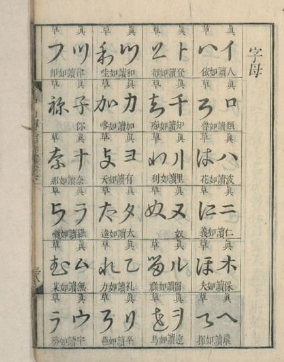
Chinese translation of Okinawan Script (Hiragana and Katakana) written by Jo Hoko (徐葆光) in 1721

Since then, Japanese and American scholars have variously transcribed the regional language using a number of ad hoc romanization schemes or the katakana syllabary to demarcate its foreign nature with standard Japanese. Proponents of Okinawan tend to be more traditionalist and continue to write the language using hiragana and kanji. In any case, no standard or consensus concerning spelling issues has ever been formalized, so discrepancies between modern literary works are common.

Tana family documents (田名家文書), which are letters of rank appointment issued by the Shuri Royal Government, are written in 候文 (Japanese Epistolary style). However, after the Satsuma invasion, Japanese culture was banned as part of the policy of exoticizing Ryukyu, and under the policy of Haneji Ōji Chōshū, documents within Ryukyu also began to be written in classical Chinese.

Comparison of official documents of Tana family documents in 1523 and 1647.

Tana family documents in 1523	Tana family documents in 1647

=== Syllabary ===
Technically, they are not syllables, but rather morae. Each mora in Okinawan consists of one or two kana characters. If there are two, then the first kana is followed by a smaller version of the second kana. In each cell of the table below, the top row is the kana (hiragana to the left, katakana to the right of the dot), the middle row in rōmaji (Hepburn romanization), and the bottom row in IPA.

		Vowel															
		a	i	u	e	o	ya	yi	yu	ye	yo	wa	wi	wu	we	wo	n
Consonant	(none)	あ・ア a [a]	い・イ i [i]	う・ウ u [u]	え・エ e [e]	お・オ o [o]	や・ヤ ya [ja]	いぃ・イィ yi [ji]	ゆ・ユ yu [ju]	えぇ・エェ ye [je]	よ・ヨ yo [jo]	わ・ワ wa [wa]	ゐ・ヰ wi [wi]	をぅ・ヲゥ wu [wu]	ゑ・ヱ we [we]	を・ヲ wo [wo]	ん・ン n [ɴ] ([n̩], [ŋ̣], [ṃ])
Consonant	Q (glottal stop)	あ・ア; Qa [ʔa]	い・イ; Qi [ʔi]	う・ウ; Qu [ʔu]	え・エ; Qe [ʔe]	お・オ; Qo [ʔo]	っや・ッヤ; Qya [ʔʲa]		っゆ・ッユ; Qyu [ʔʲu]		っよ・ッヨ; Qyo [ʔʲo]	っわ・ッワ; Qwa [ʔʷa]	っゐ・ッヰ; Qwi [ʔʷi]		っゑ・ッヱ; Qwe [ʔʷe]	っを・ッヲ; Qwo [ʔʷo]	っん・ッン; Qn [ʔɴ] ([ʔn̩], [ʔṃ])
Consonant	k	か・カ ka [ka]	き・キ ki [ki]	く・ク ku [ku]	け・ケ ke [ke]	こ・コ ko [ko]	きゃ・キャ kya [kʲa]		きゅ・キュ kyu [kʲu]		きょ・キョ kyo [kʲo]	くゎ・クヮ kwa [kʷa]	くぃ・クィ kwi [kʷi]		くぇ・クェ kwe [kʷe]	くぉ・クォ kwo [kʷo]	
Consonant	g	が・ガ ga [ɡa]	ぎ・ギ gi [ɡi]	ぐ・グ gu [ɡu]	げ・ゲ ge [ɡe]	ご・ゴ go [ɡo]	ぎゃ・ギャ gya [ɡʲa]		ぎゅ・ギュ gyu [ɡʲu]		ぎょ・ギョ gyo [ɡʲo]	ぐゎ・グヮ gwa [ɡʷa]	ぐぃ・グィ gwi [ɡʷi]		ぐぇ・グェ gwe [ɡʷe]	ぐぉ・グォ gwo [ɡʷo]	
Consonant	s	さ・サ sa [sa]	すぃ・スィ si [si]	す・ス su [su]	せ・セ se [se]	そ・ソ so [so]											
Consonant	sh	しゃ・シャ sha [ɕa]	し・シ shi [ɕi]	しゅ・シュ shu [ɕu]	しぇ・シェ she [ɕe]	しょ・ショ sho [ɕo]											
Consonant	z	ざ・ザ za [za]	ずぃ・ズィ zi [zi]	ず・ズ zu [zu]	ぜ・ゼ ze [ze]	ぞ・ゾ zo [zo]											
Consonant	j	じゃ・ジャ (ぢゃ・ヂャ) ja [dʑa]	じ・ジ (ぢ・ヂ) ji [dʑi]	じゅ・ヂュ (ぢゅ・ヂュ) ju [dʑu]	じぇ・ジェ (ぢぇ・ヂェ) je [dʑe]	じょ・ジョ (ぢょ・ヂョ) jo [dʑo]											
Consonant	t	た・タ ta [ta]	てぃ・ティ ti [ti]	とぅ・トゥ tu [tu]	て・テ te [te]	と・ト to [to]											
Consonant	d	だ・ダ da [da]	でぃ・ディ di [di]	どぅ・ドゥ du [du]	で・デ de [de]	ど・ド do [do]											
Consonant	ts	つぁ・ツァ tsa [t͡sa]	つぃ・ツィ tsi [t͡si]	つ・ツ tsu [t͡su]	つぇ・ツェ tse [t͡se]	つぉ・ツォ tso [t͡so]											
Consonant	ch	ちゃ・チャ cha [t͡ɕa]	ち・チ chi [t͡ɕi]	ちゅ・チュ chu [t͡ɕu]	ちぇ・チェ che [t͡ɕe]	ちょ・チョ cho [t͡ɕo]	ya		yu		yo						
Consonant	n	な・ナ na [na]	に・ニ ni [ni]	ぬ・ヌ nu [nu]	ね・ネ ne [ne]	の・ノ no [no]	にゃ・ニャ nya [ɲa]		にゅ・ニュ nyu [ɲu]		にょ・ニョ nyo [ɲo]	long vowel / double consonant; 〜（あ、い、う、え、お）・ー; ~(a, i, u, e, o); ~[Vː] / っ・ッ (Any consonant) [Cː]					
Consonant	h	は・ハ ha [ha]	ひ・ヒ hi [çi]		へ・ヘ he [he]	ほ・ホ ho [ho]	ひゃ・ヒャ hya [ça]		ひゅ・ヒュ hyu [çu]		ひょ・ヒョ hyo [ço]	long vowel / double consonant; 〜（あ、い、う、え、お）・ー; ~(a, i, u, e, o); ~[Vː] / っ・ッ (Any consonant) [Cː]					
Consonant	f	ふぁ・ファ fa [ɸa]	ふぃ・フィ fi [ɸi]	ふ・フ fu/hu [ɸu]	ふぇ・フェ fe [ɸe]	ふぉ・フォ fo [ɸo]						long vowel / double consonant; 〜（あ、い、う、え、お）・ー; ~(a, i, u, e, o); ~[Vː] / っ・ッ (Any consonant) [Cː]					
Consonant	b	ば・バ ba [ba]	び・ビ bi [bi]	ぶ・ブ bu [bu]	べ・ベ be [be]	ぼ・ボ bo [bo]						long vowel / double consonant; 〜（あ、い、う、え、お）・ー; ~(a, i, u, e, o); ~[Vː] / っ・ッ (Any consonant) [Cː]					
Consonant	p	ぱ・パ pa [pa]	ぴ・ピ pi [pi]	ぷ・プ pu [pu]	ぺ・ペ pe [pe]	ぽ・ポ po [po]						long vowel / double consonant; 〜（あ、い、う、え、お）・ー; ~(a, i, u, e, o); ~[Vː] / っ・ッ (Any consonant) [Cː]					
Consonant	m	ま・マ ma [ma]	み・ミ mi [mi]	む・ム mu [mu]	め・メ me [me]	も・モ mo [mo]	みゃ・ミャ mya [mʲa]		みゅ・ミュ myu [mʲu]		みょ・ミョ myo [mʲo]	long vowel / double consonant; 〜（あ、い、う、え、お）・ー; ~(a, i, u, e, o); ~[Vː] / っ・ッ (Any consonant) [Cː]					
Consonant	r	ら・ラ ra [ɾa]	り・リ ri [ɾi]	る・ル ru [ɾu]	れ・レ re [ɾe]	ろ・ロ ro [ɾo]	りゃ・リャ rya [ɾʲa]		りゅ・リュ ryu [ɾʲu]		りょ・リョ ryo [ɾʲo]	long vowel / double consonant; 〜（あ、い、う、え、お）・ー; ~(a, i, u, e, o); ~[Vː] / っ・ッ (Any consonant) [Cː]					

== Grammar ==
Okinawan follows a subject–object–verb word order and makes large use of particles as in Japanese. Okinawan retains a number of Japonic grammatical features also found in Old Japanese but lost (or highly restricted) in Modern Japanese, such as a distinction between the terminal form (終止形) and the attributive form (連体形), the genitive function of が ga (lost in the Shuri dialect), the nominative function of ぬ nu (cf. Japanese: の no), as well as honorific/plain distribution of ga and nu in nominative use.

Okinawan conjugation, for comparison in the framework of Classical Japanese
書ちゅん "to write" Classical Japanese: 書く kaku
		Shuri		Classical Japanese	
Irrealis	未然形	書か	kaka-	書か	kaka-
Continuative	連用形	書ち	kachi-	書き	kaki-
Terminal	終止形	書ちゅん	kachun	書く	kaku
Attributive	連体形	書ちゅる	kachuru	書く	kaku
Realis	已然形	書き	kaki-	書け	kake-
Imperative	命令形	書き	kaki	書け	kake

One etymology given for the -un and -uru endings is the continuative form suffixed with uri ("to be; to exist", cf. Classical Japanese: 居り wori): -un developed from the terminal form uri; -uru developed from the attributive form uru, i.e.:

- kachuru derives from kachi-uru;
- kachun derives from kachi-uri; and
- yumun ("to read", cf. Japanese: 読む yomu) derives from yumi + uri.

A similar etymology is given for the terminal -san and attributive -saru endings for adjectives: the stem suffixed with さ sa (nominalises adjectives, i.e. high → height, hot → heat), suffixed with ari ("to be; to exist; to have", cf. Classical Japanese: 有り ari), i.e.:

- takasan ("high; tall", cf. Japanese: 高い takai) derives from taka-sa-ari;
- achisan ("hot; warm", cf. Japanese: 暑い atsui) derives from atsu-sa-ari; and
- yutasaru ("good; pleasant", cf. Japanese: 豊かな yutakana "abundant; plentiful") derives from yuta-sa-aru.

=== Parts of speech ===
Nature of the part of speech in a sentence						Part of speech
Independent	No conjugation	Can become a subject				Noun (名詞)
Independent	No conjugation	Can become a subject				Pronoun (代名詞)
Independent	No conjugation	Cannot become a subject	Other words come after	Modifies	Modifies a declinable word	Adverb (副詞)
Independent	No conjugation	Cannot become a subject	Other words come after	Modifies	Modifies a substantive	Prenominal adjective (連体詞)
Independent	No conjugation	Cannot become a subject	Other words come after	Connects		Conjunction (接続詞)
Independent	No conjugation	Cannot become a subject	Other words may not come after			Interjection / exclamation (感動詞)
Independent	Conjugates	Declinable word	Shows movements	Conclusive form ends in "ん (n)"		Verb (動詞)
Independent	Conjugates	Declinable word	Shows the property or state	Conclusive form ends in "さん (san)"		Adjective (形容詞)
Independent	Conjugates	Declinable word	Shows existence or decision of a certain thing	"やん (yan)" attaches to a substantive such as a noun		Existential-identificative verb (存在動詞)
Independent	Conjugates	Declinable word	Shows state of existence of events	"やん (yan)" attaches to the word that shows state		Adjectival verb (形容動詞)
Dependent	Conjugates	Makes up for the meanings of conjugated words		Conclusive form ends in "ん (n)"		Auxiliary Verb (助動詞)
Dependent	No conjugation	Attaches to other words and shows the relationship between words				Particle (助詞)
Dependent	No conjugation	Attaches to the head of a word and adds meaning or makes a new word				Prefix (接頭語)
Dependent	No conjugation	Attaches to the end of a word and adds meaning or makes a new word				Suffix (接尾語)

==== Nouns (名詞) ====
Nouns are classified as independent, non-conjugating part of speech that can become a subject of a sentence

==== Pronouns (代名詞) ====
Pronouns are classified the same as nouns, except that pronouns are more broad.

Okinawan pronouns
		Singular				Plural			
		Personal	Demonstrative			Personal	Demonstrative		
		Personal	Thing	Place	Direction	Personal	Thing	Place	Direction
1st person		我ん (wan); わー (wā); わみ (wami)				我達 (wattā); いがろー (igarō)			
2nd person		やー (yā); やーみ (yāmi); なー (nā); なーみ (nāmi); 御所 (unju)				いったー (ittā); なったー (nattā); うんじゅなーたー (unjunātā)			
3rd person	Proximal	くり (kuri)	くり (kuri)	くま (kuma)	くま (kuma); くがた (kugata)	くったー (kuttā)	くったー (kuttā)	くま (kuma)	くま (kuma); くがた (kugata)
3rd person	Medial	うり (uri)	うり (uri)	うま (uma)	うま (uma); うがた (ugata)	うったー (uttā)	うったー (uttā)	うま (uma)	うま (uma); うがた (ugata)
3rd person	Distal	あり (ari)	あり (ari)	あま (ama)	あま (ama); あがた (agata)	あったー (attā)	あったー (attā)	あま (ama)	あま (ama); あがた (agata)
Indefinite		たー (tā); た (ta)	じる (jiru)	まー (mā)	まー (mā); まーかた (mākata)	たったー (tattā)	じる (jiru)	まー (mā)	まー (mā); まーかた (mākata)

==== Adverbs (副詞) ====
Adverbs are classified as an independent, non-conjugating part of speech that cannot become a subject of a sentence and modifies a declinable word (用言; verbs, adverbs, adjectives) that comes after the adverb. There are two main categories to adverbs and several subcategories within each category, as shown in the table below.

Okinawan adverbs
	Adverbs showing state or condition			
	Okinawan	Japanese	English	Example (Okinawan, Japanese, translation)
Time	ひっちー (hitchī)	しょっちゅう (shotchū); いつも (itsumo); 始終 (shijū)	Always	あぬ 夫婦(ふぃとぅんだー) ひっちー、 たっくゎいむっくゎい びけーそーん。 Anu fitundā hitchī, takkwaimukkwai bikēsōn. あの 夫婦 は いつも、 寄り添って ばかり いる。 Ano fūfu wa itsumo, yorisotte bakari iru. That couple is always sticking close.
Time	まーるけーてぃ (mārukēti)	たまに (tamani)	Occasionally	子(くゎ)ー まーるけーてぃ、 親(うや) ぬ 加勢(かしー)しーが 行(い)ちゅん。 Kwā mārukēti, uya nu kashīshīga ichun. 子供 は たまに、 親 の 手伝い に 行く。 Kodomo wa tamani, oya no tetsudai ni iku. The kid occasionally goes to help their parent.
Time	ちゃーき (chāki)	直ぐ (sugu)	Already	くぬ 車(くるま)ー ちゃーき、 けーやんでぃとーんたん。 Kunu kurumā chāki, kēyanditōntan. この 車 は 直ぐ、 壊れて しまっていた。 Kono kuruma wa sugu, kowarete shimatteita. This car broke already.
Time	やがてぃ (yagati)	やがて (yagate)	Shortly	やがてぃ、 太陽(てぃだ) ぬ 落(う)てぃゆしが、 御所(うんじょ)ー 来(く)ーん。 Yagati, tida nu utiyushiga, unjuō kūn. やがて、 太陽 が 落ちるが、 あなた は こない。 Yagate, taiyō ga ochiruga, anata wa konai. The sun will disappear shortly, but you are not here.
Time	未だ (nāda)	まだ (mada)	Yet	彼女(あり)が 胆(ちもー) 未(なー)だ、 直(のー)らん。 Ariga chimō nāda, nōran. 彼女 の 機嫌 は まだ、 直らない。 Kanojo no kigen wa mada, naoranai. Her mood has yet to become better.
Time	ちゃー (chā)	いつも (itsumo)	Always	あま ぬ 犬(いのー) ちゃー、 あびとーん。 Ama nu inō chā, abitōn. あそこ の 犬 は いつも、 吠えている。 Asoko no inu wa itsumo, hoeteiru. The dog over there is always barking.
Time	ちゅてーや (chutēya)	少しは (sukoshiwa); ちょっとは (chottowa)	A little	ちゅてーや、 待(ま)っちょーきよー。 Chutēya, matchōkiyō. 少しは、 待っておいてよ。 Sukoshiwa, matteoiteyo. Wait a little.
Time	あっとぅむす (attumusu)	急に (kyūni)	Suddenly	どぅし ぬ あっとぅむす、 はっ来(ち)ょーたんどー。 Dushi nu attumusu, hachōtandō. 友達 が 急に、 来ていたよ。 Tomodachi ga kyūni, kiteitayo. My friend suddenly came.
Time	まるひーじーや (maruhījīya)	普段は (fudanwa)	Normally	隣(とぅない) ぬ 三郎主(さんだーすー) や まるひーじーや 寝(に)んてぃどぅ居(う)ゆる。 Tunai nu Sandāsū ya maruhījīya nintidūyuru. 隣 の 三郎爺は 普段は 寝ている。 Tonari no Sandā-jī fudanwa neteiru. Sanda is normally sleeping.
Time	いっとぅちゃー (ittuchā)	しばらくは (shibarakuwa)	A little while	いっとぅちゃー、 門口(じょーぐち) んじ 待(ま)っちょーけー。 Ittuchā, jōguchi nji matchōkē. しばらくは、 門 で 待っておけ。 Shibarakuwa, mon de matteoke. Wait at the gate a little while.
Quantity	いふぃ (ifi)	少し (sukoshi)	A little	三郎(さんだー)、 いふぇー、 汝(やー) たまし から 分(わ)きてぃ取(とぅ)らせー。 Sandā, ifē, yā tamashi kara wakititurasē. 三郎、 少し は 君 の 分 から 分けてくれ。 Sandā, sukoshi wa kimi no bun kara waketekure. Sanda, please share a little bit of yours.
Quantity	ちゃっさきー (chassakī)	沢山 (takusan)	Many, a lot of	御主前(うすめー) や 山(やま) から ちゃっさきー、 薪(たむん)、 持(む)ち来(ち)ぇーん。 Usumē ya yama kara chassakī, tamun, muchichēn. お爺さん は 山 から 沢山、 薪 を 持ってきてある。 Ojī-san wa yama kara takusan, maki wo mottekitearu. The old man brought a lot of firewood.
Quantity	はてぃるか (hatiruka)	随分 (zuibun)	A lot	昨日(ちぬー) や はてぃるか、 歩(あ)っちゃん。 Chinū ya hatiruka, atchan. 昨日 は 随分、 歩いた。 Kinō wa zuibun, aruita. I walked a lot yesterday.
Quantity	ぐゎさない (gwasanai)	わんさか (wansaka)	Abundant	我達(わったー) 畑(はる) んかい や 黍(うーじぇー) ぐゎさない、 まんどーんどー。 Wattā haru nkai ya ūjē gwasanai, mandōndō. 私達 の 畑 に は 砂糖黍 は わんさか あるよ。 Watashitachi no hatake ni wa satōkibi wa wansaka aruyo. We have abundant sugar cane in our farm.
Quantity	満っちゃきー (mitchakī); 満っちゃかー (mitchakā)	一杯 (ippai)	A lot	芋(んむ) やれー、 しんめーん 鍋(なーび) んかい 満(み)っちゃきー （満(み)っちゃかー）、 あんどー。 Nmu yarē, shinmēn nābi nkai mitchakī (mitchakā), andō. 芋 なら 大鍋 に、 一杯、 あるよ。 Imo nara ōnabe ni, ippai, aruyo. We have a lot of potatoes in the big pot.
Quantity	ゆっかりうっさ (yukkariussa)	随分 (zuibun)	A lot	糸満(いくまん) んかい や 清(ちゅ)ら顔(かーぎ) ぬ ゆっかりうっさ、 居(う)ゆ んでぃ。 Ikuman nkai ya churakāgi nu yukkariussa, uyu ndi. 糸満 に は 美人 が 随分、 いる そうだ。 Itoman ni wa bijin ga zuibun, iru sōda. I heard that there are a lot of beautiful women in Itoman.
Quantity	うすまさ (usumasa)	恐ろしく (osoroshiku)	Extremely, a lot of	がじゃん坂(びら) んかい や うすまさ、 がじゃん ぬ 居(う)ゆた んでぃ。 Gajanbira nkai ya usumasa, gajan nu uyuta ndi. ガジャンビラ に は 恐ろしく、 蚊 が いた そうだ。 Gajanbira ni wa osoroshiku, ka ga ita sōda. I heard that there were a lot of mosquitoes in Gajanbira.
Quantity	まんたきー (mantakī)	一杯 (ippai)	Full, a lot	水(みじ)ー まんたきー、 入(い)りてぃ、 たじらしよー。 Mijī mantakī, iriti, dajirashiyō. 水 は 一杯、 入れて、 焚いてね。 Mizu wa ippai, irete, taitene. Put it full of water and heat it.
Quantity	なーふぃん (nāfin)	もっと (motto)	More	くぬ 湯(ゆ) んかい 水(みじぇー)、 なーふぃん、 んべーてぃ呉(くぃ)れー。 Kunu yu nkai mijē, nāfin, nbētikwirē. この お湯 に 水 を もっと、 足してくれ。 Kono oyu ni mizu wo motto, tashitekure. Add more (water) to this hot water.
Quantity	軽ってんぐゎ (kattengwa)	少しだけ (sukoshidake)	A little	今日(ちゅー) ぬ 持飯(むちばん) めーや 軽(か)ってんぐゎ、 容(い)りてぃ取(とぅ)らせー。 Chiyū nu muchiban mēya kattengwa, irititurasē. 今日 の 弁当 は 少しだけ、 入れてちょうだい。 Kyō no bentō wa sukoshidake, iretechōdai. Please give me just a little for today's bento box.
Degree	でーじな (dējina)	大変 (taihen)	Very	御所(うんじゅ) が 三線(さんしん) ぬ 皮(かー) や でーじな、 上等(じょーとー) やんやー。 Unju ga sanshin nu kā ya dējina, jōtō yan'yā あなた の 三味線 の 皮 は 大変、 上等 ですね。 Anata no shamisen no kawa wa taihen, jōtō desune. The leather of your shamisen is very high quality.
Degree	じまま (jimama)	随分 (zuibun)	Fairly, quite	我(わ)んねー 若さいに ーや じまま、 勉強(びんちょー) しゃん。 Wannē wakasainī ya jimama, binchō shan. 私 は 若い頃 は、 随分、 勉強 した。 Watashi wa wakaikoro wa, zuibun, benkyō shita. When I was young, I used to study quite a lot.
Degree	よねー (yonē)	そんなには (sonnaniwa)	Not too much	今度(くんどぅ) ぬ 正月(しょーぐゎち) え よねー、 ゆくららんさー。 Kundu nu shōgwachi e yonē, yukuraransā. 今度 の 正月 は、 そんなには、 休めないな。 Kondo no shōgatsu wa, sonnaniwa, yasumenaina. I cannot rest too much during this New Year's celebration.
Degree	いーるく (īruku)	良く (yoku)	Often	くぬ 海(うみ) んじ え いーるく、 泳(うい)じゅんどー。 Kunu umi nji e īruku, uijundō. この 海 で は、 良く、 泳ぐよ。 Kono umi de wa, yoku, oyoguyo. I often swim in this ocean.
Degree	にりるか (niriruka)	うんざりするほど (unzarisuruhodo)	To a tiresome degree	昨日(ちぬー) や にりるか、 荷(にー)、 かやーちゃん。 Chinū ya niriruka, nī, kayāchan. 昨日 は、 うんざりするほど、 荷 を 運んだ。 Kinō wa, unzarisuruhodo, ni wo hokonda. I carried luggage to a tiresome degree yesterday.
Degree	わじるか (wajiruka)	怒るほど (okoruhodo)	To the extent someone gets irritated	次郎(じらー)が 作(ちゅく)たる書類や 課長(かちょー)が わじるか、間違(ばっぺー)とーたん。; Jirā ga chukutaru shorui ya kachō ga wajiruka, bappētōtan.: 次郎が作った書類は課長が怒るほど、間違っていた。; Jirā ga tsukutta shorui wa kachō ga okoruhodo, machigetteita.: The documents that Jira made had so many errors that the department chief got irritated.
Degree	あいゆか (aiyuka)	とても (totemo)	Very	我(わ)んねー あいゆか、腸(わた)ぬ病(や)でぃ、ひらきとーたん。; Wannē aiyuka, wata nu yadi, hirakitōtan.: 私はとても、お腹が痛くて、しゃがんでいた。; Watashi wa totemo, onaka ga itakute, shagandeita.: I had a very bad stomach ache and was squatting down.
Degree	ゆくん (yukun)	余計 (yokei)	Even more	いったー兄(やっちい)や ゆくん、ちじどぅやる。; Ittā yatchī ya yukun, chijiduyaru.: 君達の兄は余計、駄目だ。; Kimitachi no ani wa yokei, dame da.: Your brother is even worse.
Degree	たった (tatta)	余計 (yokei)	Even more	時間ぬ経(た)ちいねー、彼(あり)が 病(やんめー)や たった、悪(わ)っさなゆんどー。; Jikan nu tachīnē, ari ga yanmē ya tatta, wassanayundō.: 時間が経てば、彼の病気は余計、悪くなるよ。; Jikan ga tateba, kare no byōki wa yokei, warukunaruyo.: If you wait longer, his illness will be even worse.
Degree	ちゅふぁーら (chufāra)	一杯 (ippai)	Full, enough	むのー なー、ちゅふぁーら、食(か)だん。; Munō nā, chufāra, kadan.: 食事はもう、一杯、食べた。; Shokuji wa mō, ippai, tabeta.: I have already had enough food
Degree	あんすかー (ansukā)	それほどは (sorehodowa)	Not so...	主(すー)や 三線(さんしん)や あんすかー、上手(じょーじ)えあらん。; Sū ya sanshin ya ansukā, jōji earan.: お父さんは三味線はそれほどは、上手ではない。; Otō-san wa shamisen sorehodowa jōzu dewanai.: Father is not so good at shamisen.
Degree	散ん散んとぅ (chinchintu)	散り散りに (chirijirini)	Dispersed, scattered	くまぬまんぐらー 散(ち)ん散(ち)んとぅどぅ、家(やー)やーたる。; Kuma nu mangurā chinchintu du, yā yātaru.: この辺りは散り散りに家がなった。; Kono atari wa chirijirini ie ga natta.: Houses were scattered in this area.
Situation	早く (hēku)	早く (hayaku)	Quickly	今日(ちゅー)や 早(へー)く、揃(す)てぃ取(とぅ)らしよー。; Chū ya hēku, sutiturashiyō.: 今日は早く、集まってくれよ。; Kyō wa hayaku, atsumattekureyo.: Please gather quickly today.
Situation	ようんなー (younnā)	ゆっくり (yukkuri)	Slowly	むのー慌(あわ)慌てぃらんようい、ようんなー、食(か)めー。; Munō awatiran'youi, younnā, kamē.: 食事は慌てず、ゆっくり、食べよ。; Shokuji wa awatezu, yukkuri, tabeyo.: Don't rush when you eat, eat slowly.
Situation	なんくる (nankuru)	自ずと (onozuto)	Naturally	とーないねー、なんくる、じんぶんぬん 出(ん)じてぃ来(ち)ゅーさに。; Tōnainē, nankuru, jinbunmen njitichūsani.: いざとなれば、自ずと、知恵も出てくるだろう。; Iza to nareba, onozuto, chie mo detekuru darō.: When the time comes, ideas will automatically come to our minds.
Situation	ゆったいくゎったい (yuttaikwattai)	どんぶらこと (donburakoto)	Adverb for something heavy floating down on water	川(かー)ぬ上(うい)ぬ傍(はた)から まぎ桃(むむ)ぬ ゆったいくゎったい、流(るー)りてぃ来(ち)ゃん。; Kā nu ui nu hata kara magi mumu nu yuttaikwattai, rūritichan.: 川の上の方から大きな桃がどんぶらこと、流れて来た。; Kawa no ue no hō kara ōkina momo ga donburakoto, nagaretekita.: A giant peach came floating down the river.
Situation	なぐりなぐりとぅ (nagurinaguritu)	なごりなごりと (nagorinagorito)	Reluctantly, Nostalgically	なぐりなぐりとぅ、別りぬ挨拶(えーさち)すん。; Nagurinaguritu, wakari nu ēsachi sun.: なごりなごりと、別れの挨拶をする。; Nagorinagorito, wakare no aisatsu wo suru.: We said goodbye reluctantly.
Situation	しんじんとぅ (shinjintu)	しみじみと (shimijimito)	Nostalgically	しんじんとぅ、節歌やてぃん、歌てぃんだ。; Shinjintu, fushiuta yatin, utatinda.: しみじみと、節歌でも、歌ってみよう。; Shimijimito, fushiuta demo, utattemiyō.: Let's sing a traditional song nostalgically.
Situation	次第次第 (shidēshidē)	次第に (shidaini)	Gradually	太陽(てぃだ)ー 西(いりー)んかい 次第次第(しでーしでー)、落(う)てぃてぃ行ちゅん。; Tidā irī nkai shidēshidē, utitīchun.: 太陽は西へ次第に、沈んで行く。; Taiyō wa nishi he shidaini, shizundeiku.: The sun gradually sets to the west.
Situation	ちゅらーさ (churāsa)	残らず (nokorazu)	Completely	烏(がらさー)ぬ ちり袋(ぶくる)、ちゅらーさ、きざあちねーらん。; Garasā nu chiribukuru, churāsa, kizāchinēran.: 烏がゴミ袋を、残らず、漁ってしまった。; Karasu ga gomibukuro, nokorazu, asatteshimatta.: The crows completely rummaged through the garbage bags.
Situation	どぅく (duku)	あまりにも (amarinimo)	Too much, excessively	どぅく、ゆくしびけー、しーねー、罰(ばち)、被(かん)じゅん。; Duku, yukushi bikē, shīnē, bachi, kanjun.: あまりにも、嘘ばかりついたら、罰が当たる。; Amarinimo, uso bakari tsuitara, batsu ga ataru.: If you tell too many lies, you will incur divine punishment.
Situation	だんだんだんだん (dandandandan)	段々 (dandan)	Gradually	汝(なー)笛(ふぁんそー)ぬ音(うとぅ)お だんだんだんだん、ましなとおん。; Nā fansō nu utu o dandandandan, mashinatōn.: あなたの笛の音は段々、良くなっている。; Anata no fue no oto wa dandan, yokunatteiru.: You are gradually becoming better at playing flute.
Situation	次第に (shidēni)	次第に (shidaini)	Gradually	いがろうん、次第(しでえ)に、年(とぅし)、取(とぅ)たんやあ。; Igaroun, shidēni, tushi, tutan'yā.: 我々も次第に歳を取ったね。; Wareware mo shidaini toshi wo totta ne.: We have gradually gotten old.
Situation	どぅくだら (dukudara)	ひどく (hidoku)	Badly	どぅくだら、ひみちしいねえ、医者(いさ)んかい診しらんでえ。; Dukudara, himichi shīnē, isa nkai mishirandē.: ひどく、せき込んだら、医者に診せないと。; Hidoku, seki kondara, isha ni misenaito.: If you start to cough badly, you have to go see a doctor.
Situation	まっすぐ (massugu)	まっすぐ (massugu)	Straight	くまから あまんかい まっすぐ、行ちいねえ、海んかい出(ん)じゆん。; Kuma kara ama nkai massugu, ichīnē, umi nkai njiyun.: ここからあそこへ、まっすぐ、行くと、海に出る。; Koko kara asoko he, massugu, ikuto, umi ni deru.: If you go straight from there, you will see the ocean.
Situation	まっとうば (mattouba)	正しく (tadashiku)	Correctly	汝(なー)や 沖縄口(うちなーぐちぇ)ー まっとうば、使(ちか)りよお。; Nā ya uchināguchē mattouba, chikariyō.: 君は沖縄語を正しく使ってよ。; Kimi wa okinawago wo tadashiku tsukatteyo.: Please use Okinawan correctly.
Situation	だってぃどぅ (dattidu)	ちゃんと (chanto)	Properly	家(やー)や だってぃどぅ、作(ちゅく)ゆんどお。; Yā ya dattidu, chukuyundō.: 家はちゃんと、作るんだよ。; Ie wa chanto, tsukurundayo.: You must build a house properly.
Situation	だてん (daten)	きちんと (kichinto)	Neatly	あんまあや 今日(ちゅう)や だてん、すがとおん。; Anmā ya chū ya daten, sugatōn.: 母は今日はきちんと、身なりを整えている。; Haha wa kyō wa kichinto, minari wo totonoeteiru.: My mother has dressed neatly today.
Situation	さっぱっとぅ (sappattu)	さっぱり (sappari)	Freshly	断髪(だんぱち)さあに、さっぱっとぅ、そおん。; Danpachi sāni, sappattu, sōn.: 散髪をして、さっぱりしている。; Sanbatsu wo shite, sappari shiteiru.: Looking fresh after a haircut.
Situation	しかっとぅ (shikattu)	しっかり (shikkari)	Carefully	親(うや)ぬ言(ゆ)し、しかっとぅ、聞(ち)ちょうきよお。; Uya nu yushi, shikattu, chichoukiyō.: 親の言うことをしっかり、聞いておけよ。; Oya no iukoto wo shikkari, kiiteokeyo.: Listen to your parents carefully.
Situation	うかっとぅお (ukattuo)	うかつには (ukatsuniwa)	Thoughtlessly, carelessly	あんしん、試験ー、うかっとぅお、受きららん。; Anshin, shikennō, ukattuo, ukiraran.: それでも、試験はうかつには受けられない。; Soredemo, shiken wa ukatsuniwa ukerarenai.: You cannot take the exam thoughtlessly.
Situation	たった (tatta)	余計 (yokei)	Even more	うぬ病(やんめー)や にじいねえ、たった、悪(わ)っさなゆんどお。; Unu yanmē ya nijīnē, tatta, wassanayundō.: その病気は我慢すると、余計、悪くなるよ。; Sono byōki wa gaman suru to, yokei, warukunaruyo.: If you endure your illness too much, it will get even worse.
Adverbs showing judgement
	Okinawan	Japanese	English	Example
Assumption	むし (mushi)	もし (moshi)	If	むし、 言いばっぺえしいねえ、 如何(いちゃ) すか。 Mushi, ībappēshīnē, icha suka. もし、 言い間違えたら、 どう するか。 Moshi, iimachigaetara, dō suruka. What would we do if we said something wrong.
Assumption	たとぅい (tatui)	例え (tatoe)	Even if	たとぅい、 大風(うふかじ) ぬ 吹ちん、 くぬ 家(やあ) や 倒(とお)おりらん。 Tatui, ufukaji nu fuchin, kunu yā ya tōoriran. 例え、 大風 が 吹いても、 この 家 は 倒れない。 Tatoe, ōkaze ga fuitemo, kono ie wa taorenai. Even if a strong wind blew, this house will not fall down.
Assumption	例れー (taturē)	例えば (tatoeba)	For example, if you compare	例れー、 沖縄(うちなー) や 大和(やまとぅ) ぬ ハワイ やさ。 Taturē, Uchinā ya Yamatu nu Hawai yasa. 例えば 沖縄 は 日本 の ハワイ さ。 Tatoteba Okinawa wa Nihon no Hawai sa. If you compare, Okinawa is like Japan's Hawaii.
Supposition	いやりん (iyarin)	きっと（いかにも） (kitto (ikanimo))	Indeed, surely	いやりん、 くぬ 鳥(すーさー) や 山原(やんばる) くぇーな どぅ やさに。 Iyarin, kunu sūsā ya yanbaru kwēna du yasani. きっと （いかにも）、 この 鳥 は 山原 クイナ なの だろうか。 Kitto (ikanimo), kono tori wa yanbaru kuina nano darōka. Surely this bird must be an Okinawa rail.
Supposition	まさか (masaka)	まさか (masaka)	No way, no idea, unlikely, it is impossible that...	まさか、 ちゅ 村(しま) んかい 従弟(いちく) ぬ しまゆ んでー、 思(うまー)んたん。 Masaka, chu shima nkai ichiku nu shimayu ndē, umāntan. まさか、 同じ 村 に 従弟 が 住んでいる とは 思わなかった。 Masaka, onaji mura ni itoko ga sundeiru towa omowanakatta. I had no idea that my cousin lived in the same village.
Supposition	むしや (mushiya)	もしや (moshiya)	By chance	むしや、うんじょー 我(わん)とぅちるめーや あらに。; もしや、あなたは私と同じ歳ではないだろうか。; Are you as old as I am by any chance?
Supposition	むしか (mushika)	もしや (moshiya)	Perhaps	むしか、今頃(なまぐる)、我事(わあくとぅ)、心配(しわ)しえ居(う)らんさに。; もしや、今頃、私のことを心配していないだろうな。; Perhaps, they might be worried about me now.
Supposition	まさか (masaka)	まさか (masaka)	No way, no idea, unlikely, it is impossible that...	まさか、今日(ちゅう)や う祭(まち)いんでえ 思(うま)あんたん。; Masaka chūya umachī ndē umāntan: まさか、今日はウマチーとは思わなかった。; I had no idea that today was the festival day.
Supposition	あたまに (atamani)	ほんとに (hontoni)	Really (intensifier)	あたまに、今日(ちゅう)や 暑(あち)さっさあやあ。; ほんとに、今日は暑いねえ。; It's really hot today.
Wish	どうでぃん (doudin)	どうか (dōka)	Please	どうでぃん、我(わあ)が 御願(うにげ)え、聞(ち)ちたぼうり。; どうか、私のお願いを聞いてください。; Please could you do me a favor?
Wish	たんでぃ (tandi)	どうぞ (dōzo)	Please	たんでぃ、我(わん)にんかい 水(みじ)、飲(ぬ)まち呉(くぃ)みそおれえ。; どうぞ、私に水を飲ましてください。; Please let me drink some water.
Wish	必じ (kannaji)	必ず (kanarazu)	Always, have to	二男(じな)ぬうや 必(かんな)じ、サッカー部んかい 入(い)ゆんでぃ。; 二男は必ず、サッカー部に入るんだと。; The second oldest son has to join the soccer team.
Wish	如何しん (chāshin)	どうしても (dōshitemo)	Have to, at any cost	あぬ映画(えいぐゎ)、如何(ちゃあ)しん、見(ん)じいぶしゃん。; あの映画をどうしても、見たい。; I want to watch the movie at any cost.
Doubt	如何し (chāshi)	どうやって (dōyatte)	How	くぬパソコンや 如何(ちゃあ)し、動(んじゅ)かすが。; このパソコンはどうやって、動かすのか。; How do you use this computer?
Doubt	みったい (mittai)	一体 (ittai)	Really	みったい、うんじゅおー、我どぅ 抑(うせ)えとおるい。; 一体、あなたは私を馬鹿にしているのか。; Really, are you making fun of me?
Doubt	あんすか (ansuka)	そんなに (sonnani)	So much, really	後(くし)ぬあばあや あんすか、歌上手(うたじょうじい)やんなあ。; 後隣りのあ姉さんはそんなに、歌が上手なのか。; Is the lady next door really good at singing?
Doubt	何んち (nūnchi)	何故 (naze)	Why	何(ぬう)んち、父(すう)や 行かんが。; 何故、父は行かないか。; Why doesn't father want to go?
Denial or negation	あちらん (achiran)	一向に (ikkōni)	Completely, at all	ちゃっさ、あさがちしん、あちらん前(めー)あがちんならん。; いくら、焦っても、一向に、前に進むことも出来ない。; No matter how much we hurry, we cannot make any progress at all.
Denial or negation	じょーい (jōi)	絶対 (zettai)	Definitely	うぬ石ー童(わらび)のーじょーい、持(む)っちいゆさん。; この石は子供は絶対、持てない。; This rock, the child definitely cannot hold.
Denial or negation	ちゃっさん (chassan)	度を超して (do o koshite)	Go too far	ちゃっさん、遊(あし)ばんしえーまし。; 度を超して、遊ばない方が良い。; You should not go too far when you're playing.
Denial or negation	いふぃん (ifin)	少しも (sukoshimo)	At all	どぅく、忙(いちゅな)さぬ、いふぃん、ゆくららん。; あまりにも、忙しくて、少しも、休めない。; I'm so busy I cannot rest at all.
Denial or negation	如何ん (chān)	どうすることも (dōsurukotomo)	Cannot do anything	じかじん 聞(ち)かんくとぅ、如何(ちゃー)ん、ならん。; 言うことも聞かないから、どうすることも出来ない。; They don't listen, so I cannot do anything.
Decision	じゅんに (junni)	本当に (hontōni)	Really, truly	くぬ三線(さんしん)や じゅんに、秀物(そうむん)やっさー。; この三味線は本当に、立派なものだな。; This is a truly amazing Sanshin.
Decision	必じ (kannaji)	必ず (kanarazu)	Definitely	我(わ)んねー必(かんな)じ、御所(うんじゅ)ぬ所(とぅくる)んかい 行ちゃん。; 私は必ず、あなたの所に行く。; I will definitely go to your place.
Decision	うん如おりー (ungutuorī)	そのような事 (sonoyōnakoto)	Such a thing	うん如(ぐと)ーりーや 当い前(めー)なかい、誰(たー)がん なゆん。; そのような事は、当然、誰にでもできる。; Anybody can do such a thing.
Others	いちゃんだん (ichandan)	むやみに (muyamini)	Recklessly	昔(んかし)ん人(ちょ)ーいちゃんだん、戦、そーたん。; 昔の人はむやみに戦争をしていた。; People used to recklessly start wars in the past.
Others	うったてぃ (uttati)	わざと (wazato)	On purpose	あんぐゎーなかい 見(ん)だりーんねーし、二歳(にーせー)やうったてぃ、どぅ返(げー)りゆたん。; 女の子に見られようと、青年はわざと、転びよった。; The boy fell on purpose so that the girl would notice him.
Others	なー (nā)	もう (mō)	Already	客(ちゃこ)ーなー、去(は)いたん。; お客さんはもう、行ってしまった。; The guests are already gone.

==== Prenominal adjectives (連体詞) ====
Prenominal adjectives (連体詞)
Prenominal adjectives are classified the same as adverbs, except instead of modifying a declinable word, it modifies a substantive (体言; nouns and pronouns).
Okinawan	Japanese	English
いぃー (yī)	良い (ii)	good

==== Conjunctions (接続詞) ====
Conjunctions (接続詞)
Conjunctions are classified as an independent, non-conjugating part of speech that connects words coming after to words coming before.
Okinawan	Japanese	English
あんさびーくとぅ (ansabīkutu)	そういうわけですから (sō iu wake desukara)	"For that reason"
あんし (anshi)	それで (sorede); それから (sorekara)	"And then"
やくとぅ (yakutu)	だから (dakara)	"So"
やしが (yashiga)	しかし (shikashi); そうではあるが (sōde wa aruga)	"But"

==== Interjections and exclamations (感動詞) ====
Interjections and exclamations (感動詞)
Interjections are classified as an independent, non-conjugating part of speech, where it does not modify or connect anything, and other words may not come after it.
Okinawan	Japanese	English	Notes
あい (ai)	おや (oya)	Oh / wow	驚きの気持ちを表す Expression of surprise
あきさみよー (akisamiyō)	あらまあ (aramā)	Oh dear	Expression of dismay, concern, or worry
あきとーなー (akitōnā)	おやまあ (oyamā)	Oh dear	失敗した時や驚いた時などに発する Expression of dismay, concern, or worry
うー (ū)	はい (hai)	Yes	Honorific "yes"
あいびらん (aibiran); をぅーをぅー (wūwū)	いいえ (īe)	No	目上の人に対して用いる Honorific "no"
だー (dā)	おい (oi); どれ (dore); ほら (hora)	Hey	
とー (tō)	ほら (hora); よし (yoshi)	All right	Expression of pleasure, joy, or permission
とーとー (tōtō)	よしよし (yoshiyoshi); ほらほら (horahora)		
はっさみよー (hassamiyō)	おやまあ (oyamā)	Oh dear	呆れ返った時などに発する語
んちゃ (ncha)	なるほど (naruhodo); やっぱり (yappari); 予定通りだ (yoteidōrida)	Sure enough, As I expected	

==== Verbs (動詞) ====
Verbs are classified as an independent, conjugating part of speech that shows movements. The conclusive form ends in ん (n).

==== Adjectives (形容詞) ====
Adjectives are classified as an independent, conjugating part of speech that shows property or state. The conclusive form ends in さん (san).

==== (存在動詞) ====
存在動詞 are classified as an independent, conjugating part of speech that shows existence or decision of a certain thing. やん (yan) attaches to a substantive.

==== Adjectival verbs (形容動詞) ====
Adjectival verbs are classified as an independent, conjugating part of speech that shows the state of existence of events. やん (yan) attaches to words that shows state.

==== Auxiliary verbs (助動詞) ====
Auxiliary verbs (助動詞)
Auxiliary verbs are classified as a dependent, conjugating part of speech that makes up the meanings of conjugated words. The conclusive form ends in ん (n).
Okinawan	Japanese	English	Example
あぎーん (agīn); あぎゆん (agiyun)	しつつある (shitsutsuaru)		
ぎさん (gisan)	そうだ (sōda)		
ぐとーん (gutōn)	のようだ (noyōda)		
しみゆん (shimiyun); すん (sun)	させる (saseru)		
ぶさん (busan)	したい (shitai)	want to	
みしぇーびーん (mishēbīn)	なさいます (nasaimasu)		
みしぇーん (mishēn)	なさる (nasaru)		
ゆーすん (yūsun)	ことができる (kotogadekiru)	be able to	
りゆん (riyun); りーん (rīn)	れる (reru); られる (rareru)		

==== Particles (助詞) ====
Particles (助詞)
Case markers (格助詞)
Attaches to a substantive and marks the relationship between other words.
Okinawan	Japanese	Notes/English	Example
ぬ (nu); が (ga)	が (ga)	Nominative case. Normally ぬ (nu), but が (ga) is used for pronouns and names.	犬(いん)ぬあびゆん。我(わあ)があびゆん。; 犬が吠える。私が喋る。
ぬ (nu)	の (no)	Genitive case; possessor.	豚(うわー)ぬ肉(しし)、食(か)みーねー、体(からだ)んかいましやん。; 豚の肉を食べると体に良い。
Ø (Archaic: ゆ (yu))	を (wo)	Accusative case. Modern Okinawan does not use a direct object particle, like casual Japanese speech. "yu" exists mainly in old literary composition.	
っし (sshi)	で (de)	Instrumental case; the means by which something is achieved.	バスっし行(い)ちゃびら。; バスで行こう。; Let's go by bus.
さーに (sāni)	で (de)	Instrumental case; the means by which something is achieved.	沖縄口(うちなーぐち)さーに手紙(てぃがみ)書(か)ちゃん。; 沖縄語で手紙を書いた。; I wrote the letter in Okinawan.
なかい (nakai)・んかい (nkai)	へ (e)・に (ni)	Dative case; indirect object, benefactor, goal of motion. 手段・方法	沖縄(うちなー)んかいめんそーれー!; 沖縄へようこそ！; Welcome to Okinawa!
をぅとーてぃ (wutōti)・をぅてぃ (wuti)	で(de)	Locative case; marks the location where an action takes place, usually pertaining to an animate subject. Derives from the participle form of the verb をぅん wun "to be, to exist".	くまをぅとーてぃ憩(ゆくぃ)欲(ぶ)さん。; ここで休みたい。; I want to rest (at) here.
やか (yaka)	より (yori)	"as much as"; upper limit	彼(あり)やか大和口(やまとぅぐち)ぬ上手(じょおじ)やあらん。; 彼より日本語が上手ではない。; My Japanese isn't as good as his.
から (kara)	から (kara)	Ablative case; source, cause. 起点	
なーりー (nārī)		場所・位置	
んじ (nji)	で (de)	場所	
ん (n)		所属等	
ぬ→「〜している」「〜である」「〜い・しい」pp459.			
とぅ (tu)	と (to)	相手	
んでぃ (ndi)	と (to)	Quotative.	
に (ni)		時・場所等	
Adverbial Particles (副助詞)
Okinawan	Japanese	Notes/English	Example
びけー (bikē)	だけ (dake)		
びけーん (bikēn)	ばかり (bakari)	"only; limit"	ローマ字(じ)びけーんぬ書物(すむち)。; ローマ字ばかりの書物。; A romaji only book.
だき (daki)	だけ (dake)		
までぃ (madi)	まで (made)	"up to, until, as far as"	くぬ電車(でんしゃ)あ、首里(しゅい)までぃ行(い)ちゃびーん。帰(けー)るまでぃ待(ま)ちょーいびーん。; この電車は首里まで行く。帰るまで待つ。; This train goes as far as Shuri. I'll wait until you come home.
くれー (kurē)	ぐらい (gurai)	"around, about, approximately"	十分(じっぷん)くれーかかゆん。; 十分ぐらいかかる。; It will take about 10 minutes.
ふどぅ (fudu)	ほど (hodo)		
あたい (atai)	ぐらい (gurai)等	as much as; upper limit.	うぬ建物(たてぃむの)ー思(うむ)ゆるあたい高(たか)こーねーやびらん。; あの建物は思うぐらい高くないよ。; That building is not as tall as you imagine it to be.
んちょーん (nchōn)	さえ (sae)		
うっさ (ussa)	だけ (dake)等		
うっぴ (uppi)	だけ (dake)等		寝(に)んじ欲(ぶ)しゃるうっぴ寝(に)んでぃん済(す)まびいん。; 寝たいだけ寝ていいよ。; You can sleep as much as you want.
うひ (uhi)	だけ (dake)等		
さく (saku)	ほど (hodo)、だけ (dake)		
Binding particles (係助詞)
Okinawan	Japanese	Notes/English	Example
や (ya)	は (wa)	Topic particle for long vowels, proper nouns, or names. For other nouns, the particle fuses with short vowels. a → ā, i → ē, u → ō, e → ē, o → ō, n → nō. Pronoun 我ん (wan?) (I) becomes topicalized as 我んねー (wannē?) instead of 我んのー (wannō?) or 我んや (wan'ya?), although the latter does appear in some musical or literary works.	
あー (ā)	は (wa)	Topic particle for long vowels, proper nouns, or names. For other nouns, the particle fuses with short vowels. a → ā, i → ē, u → ō, e → ē, o → ō, n → nō. Pronoun 我ん (wan?) (I) becomes topicalized as 我んねー (wannē?) instead of 我んのー (wannō?) or 我んや (wan'ya?), although the latter does appear in some musical or literary works.	
えー (ē)	は (wa)	Topic particle for long vowels, proper nouns, or names. For other nouns, the particle fuses with short vowels. a → ā, i → ē, u → ō, e → ē, o → ō, n → nō. Pronoun 我ん (wan?) (I) becomes topicalized as 我んねー (wannē?) instead of 我んのー (wannō?) or 我んや (wan'ya?), although the latter does appear in some musical or literary works.	
おー (ō)	は (wa)	Topic particle for long vowels, proper nouns, or names. For other nouns, the particle fuses with short vowels. a → ā, i → ē, u → ō, e → ē, o → ō, n → nō. Pronoun 我ん (wan?) (I) becomes topicalized as 我んねー (wannē?) instead of 我んのー (wannō?) or 我んや (wan'ya?), although the latter does appear in some musical or literary works.	
のー (nō)	は (wa)	Topic particle for long vowels, proper nouns, or names. For other nouns, the particle fuses with short vowels. a → ā, i → ē, u → ō, e → ē, o → ō, n → nō. Pronoun 我ん (wan?) (I) becomes topicalized as 我んねー (wannē?) instead of 我んのー (wannō?) or 我んや (wan'ya?), although the latter does appear in some musical or literary works.	
ん (n)	も (mo)	"Also"	
やてぃん (yatin)	でも (demo)	"even, also in"	宇宙(うちゅー)からやてぃん万里(まんり)ぬ長城(ちょーじょー)ぬ見(み)いゆん。大和(やまとぅ)やてぃんいんちりーん口(ぐち)を勉強(びんちょー)すん。; 万里の長城は宇宙からでも見れる。日本でも英語を習う; The Great Wall of China can even be seen from space. Also in Japan, we study English.
がん (gan)	でも (demo)		
ぬん (nun)	でも (demo)		
しか (shika)	しか (shika)		
てぃらむん (tiramun)	たるもの (tarumono)		
とぅか (tuka)	とか (toka); や (ya)		
どぅ (du)	ぞ (zo); こそ (koso)		
る (ru)	ぞ (zo); こそ (koso)		
Sentence-ending particles (終助詞)
Okinawan	Japanese	Notes/English	Example
が (ga) やが (yaga)	か (ka)	Final interrogatory particle	
み (mi)	か (ka)	Final interrogatory particle	
に (ni)		可否疑問	
い (i)		強調疑問	
がやー (gayā)	かな (kana)		
さに (sani)	だろう (darō)		
なー (nā)	の (no)	Final particle expressing 問いかけ・念押し	
ばー (bā)		軽い疑問	
どー (dō)	ぞ (zo); よ (yo)		
よ (yo)	よ (yo)		
ふー (fū)		軽く言う	
な (na)	な (na)	Prohibitive	
え (e)		命令	
さ (sa)	さ (sa)		
でむね (demune)		断定	
せー (sē)		断定	
Interjectory Particles (間投助詞)
Okinawan	Japanese	Notes/English	Example
てー (tē)	ね (ne)等		
よ (yo); よお (yō)	ね (ne); よ (yo)等		
や (ya); やあ (yā)	ぬ (nu); よ (yo)等		
なー (nā)	ね (ne)等		
さり (sari)	ねえ (nē)等		
ひゃー (hyā)		意外、軽蔑	
Conjunctive particles (接続助詞)

=== Others ===
==== Copula ====
Okinawan	Past tense	Japanese									
あびーん (abīn); いびーん (ibīn)	A	ます (masu)	−2	です (desu)	−3	やいびーん (yaibīn)	−4	でーびる (dēbiru)	A	−5	でございます (degozaimasu)

==== Question words (疑問詞) ====
Okinawan	Japanese	English
いくち (ikuchi)	いくつ (ikutsu)	"How much"
いち (ichi)	いつ (itsu)	"When"
じる (jiru)	どれ (dore)	"Which"
たー (tā)	誰 (dare)	"Who"
たったー (tattā)	誰々 (daredare)	"Who" (plural)
ちゃー (chā)	どう (dō)	"How" (in what way)
ちぁっさ (chassa)	どれだけ (doredake); いくら (ikura)	"How much"
ちゃっぴ (chappi); ちゃぬあたい (chanuatai)	どれほど (dorehodo)	"How"
ちゃぬ (chanu)	どの (dono); どのような (donoyōna)	"What kind"
ぬー (nū)	何 (nani)	"What"
ぬーんち (nūnchi)	どうして (dōshite)	"Why"
まー (mā)	どこ (doko)	"Where"

=== Syntax ===
The basic word order is subject–object–verb.

Okinawan is a marked nominative language (with the accusative being unmarked) that also shows minor active–stative variation in intransitive verbs relating to existence or emergence. In existence or emergence verbs, the subject may be optionally unmarked (except for pronouns and proper names, which must be marked with ga), and marked human subjects cannot use ga anymore, but rather always with the often-inanimate marker nu.

== Example ==
=== Sample text in Standard Okinawan (Shuri-Naha dialect) ===
==== In Kanji ====
人間ー誰ん生まりやぎーなー自由やい、また、胴大切に思ゆる肝とぅ胴守らんでぃる肝ー、誰やてぃんゆぬ如授かとーるむんやん。人間ー元からいー矩ぬ備わとーくとぅ、互ーに兄弟やんでぃる考ーさーに事に当たらんだれーならん。(without ruby characters)

人間(にんじの)ー誰(たー)ん生(ん)まりやぎーなー自由(じゆ)やい、また、胴(どぅー)大切(てーしち)に思(うむ)ゆる肝(ちむ)とぅ胴(どぅー)守(まむ)らんでぃる肝(ちも)ー、誰(たー)やてぃんゆぬ如(ぐとぅ)授(さじゃ)かとーるむんやん。人間(にんじの)ー元(むーとぅ)からいー矩(かに)ぬ備(すな)わとーくとぅ、互(たげ)ーに兄弟(ちょーでー)やんでぃる考(かんげ)ーさーに事(くとぅ)に当(あ)たらんだれーならん。(with ruby characters)

==== Transliteration ====
Ninjinoo taa n 'nmariyagiinaa jiyu yai, mata, duu teeshichi ni umuyuru chimu tu duu mamurandiru chimoo, taa yatin yunugutu sajakatooru mun yan. Ninjinoo muutu kara iika ni nu sunawatookutu, tagee ni choodeeyandiru kangeesaa ni kutu ni atarandaree naran. (UDHR Article 1)

== See also ==
- Okinawan Japanese, the language most commonly spoken in Okinawa today
- Byron Fija – Okinawan-language educator (born 1969)
