= Athens Spartans RFC =

- Full name: Athens Spartans Rugby Football Club
- Nickname: Spartans Rugby
- Founded: 1982, 32 years ago
- Location: Athens, Greece
- Ground(s): Agios Kosmas, Elliniko
- Coach: Stefanos Stephanou
- Captain: Nikolas Stephanou
Team kit

Athens Spartans RFC (also known as The Spartans) is a Greek amateur rugby club based in Glyfada, a suburb of Athens. The club is the oldest rugby club in Greece and it is currently a member of the Unity cup, the top tier of domestic rugby union in Greece.

== History ==
=== 1982–2004 ===
The club was founded in 1982. Expatriates established the first rugby club in Greece in 1982, called the Athens Spartans Rugby Football Club (R.F.C.), where they played against visiting navy vessels from other countries. Over the years, the Athens Spartans travelled to numerous countries such as the United Kingdom, Belgium, the Netherlands, Germany, Spain, Malta, Bulgaria, Turkey, Cyprus and Kenya, playing different clubs and spreading the word that Greek rugby is here. The Spartans also had the pleasure of welcoming and playing against foreign rugby clubs such as the Sussex Police, Aylesbury RFC, Newick RFC, and the Blake Bears. As rugby progressed in Greece with various other rugby clubs being established throughout the country, an official rugby championship was created, which the Spartans attended every year.

=== 2004–2013 ===
In 2004 the National Rugby Association ΕΟΡ was created and became part of the IRB; the following year ΕΟΡ launched the first official national rugby union championship, which the Spartans have been part of ever since. The Spartans have also been a part of the first rugby 7’s tournament in Greece in 2008, where the Spartans reached the final and received second place in the 7’s championship. During 2012–2013 the club faced tremendous difficulties and almost ceased functioning. Due to rugby being an amateur sport in Greece there are no contracts to bind players therefore the club saw most of its players being absorbed by rival clubs. By the end of the 2012–2013 season, a majority of Greek rugby clubs left the ΕΟΡ Championship and created their own association and championship GRASS.

=== 2013–2014 ===
The club is now competing in the Unity Cup XV championship and Unity 7's cup of GRASS against Aeolos Patras, Panathinaikos Owls RFC, Attica Springboks RFC, Thessaloniki Lions RFC, WSU RFC, Titanes Kavalas RFC.

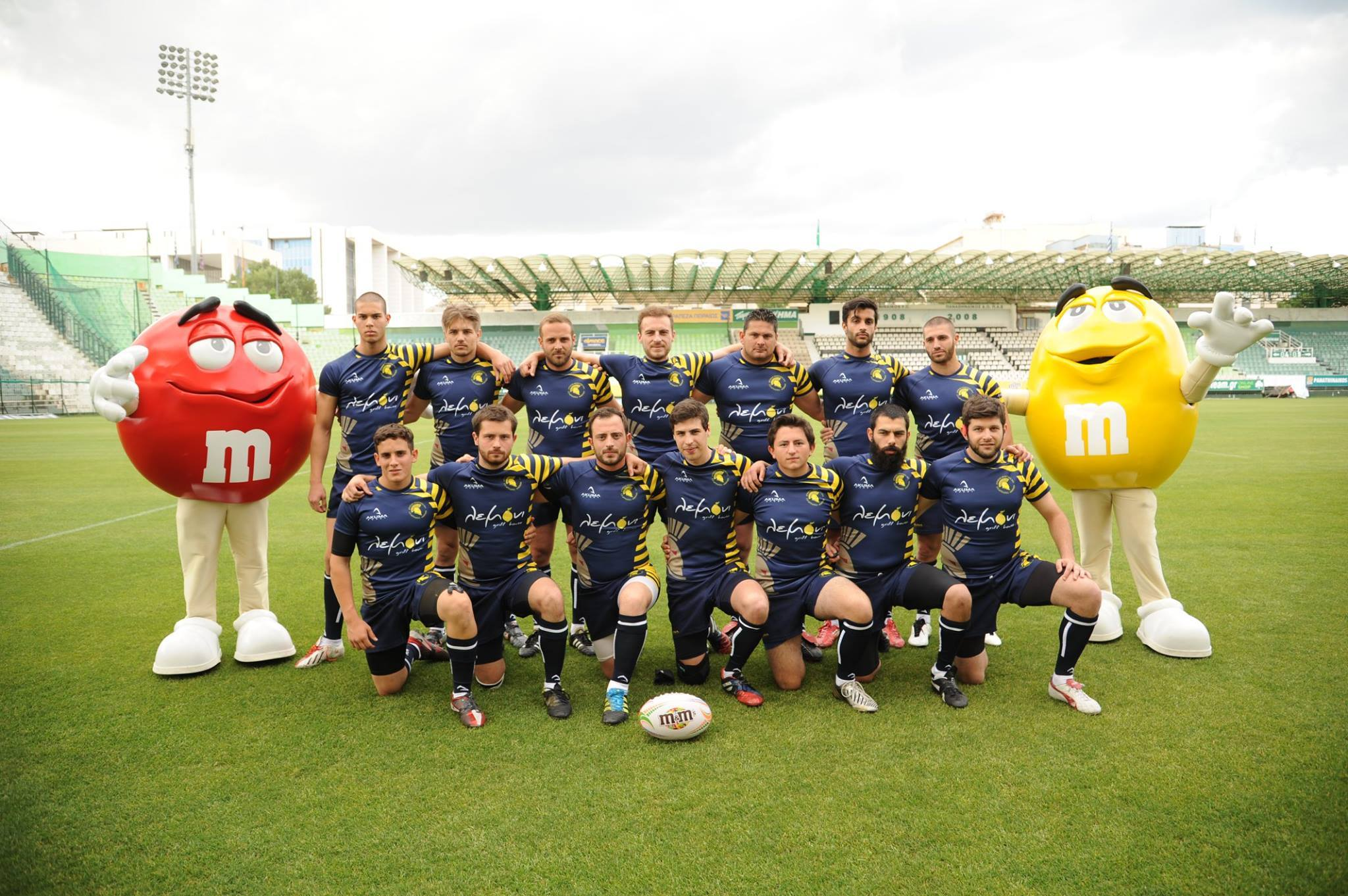
Athens 7's M&M Tournament

== Insignia and colours ==
The club insignia hasn't changed since the club was founded; it depicts an ancient Spartan helmet dyed yellow and the team kit colours have always been a combination of blue, white and yellow.

== First team squad ==
**Forwards**; (Greece) Hagipanagos Konstantinos (Greece) Andrikopoulos Panagiotis (Greece) **Stefanos Petritsopoulos** (Greece) Nikos Roussos (Greece) Aggelos Papadimas (Greece) **Grigorios Drosos** (Greece) Christos Dimakos (Greece) Tasos Tsolekas (Greece) Giannis Stefanoulis (Greece) Vangelis Viglas (Greece) Stamatiadis Epaminondas Alkiviadis (England) **Edd Gaynor** (Greece) Mantzoutas Dimitris (Greece) (Wales) **Aris Koulizakis**	**Backs**; (Greece) (South Africa) **Stephanou Stefanos** (Greece) (South Africa) **Stephanou Nikos** (c) (Greece) Kounelis Vasileios (Greece) (South Africa) George Zambetakis (Greece) (Syria) George Atte (Greece) Savvas Kontos (Greece) Petros Detsikas (Greece) Alessandro Segredo (France) **Remi Lauraire** (Greece) (England) **Dan Smeeth** (Greece) **Arapis Romanos** (England) **Matty Wallis**

In bold are the internationally capped players
