= Baseball in Greece =

Baseball in Greece is regulated by the Hellenic Baseball Softball Federation, founded in 2015. The HBSF succeeded the Hellenic Amateur Baseball Federation (HABF), which was founded in 1997. The HABF supported a domestic league, the Greek Baseball League, from 2000 to 2014. Greece is represented in international play by the Greece national baseball team.

== History ==
HABF was founded in 1997 preparation for the hosting of the 2004 Summer Olympics in Athens. The goal was "creating and eventually fielding a Greek Olympic Baseball Team for the Athens 2004 Olympic Games."(registration required) The leagues' inaugural season was in 2000, with Marousi 2004 from Athens winning the Greek Baseball league title that year. The inaugural Greek Cup was also held in 2000 and was won by another Athenian team, Spartakos Glyfadas.

Peter Angelos, the Greek-American owner of the Baltimore Orioles, helped finance the Greece team for the 2004 Olympics.

By 2008, HABF realized there would be no more government funding for baseball. The Federation was able to continue but with fewer teams. Through the work of the HABF and personal funds from its President, they sent a team to the 2008 European Qualifier's Championship in Portugal. They won all their games.

== International Competitions ==
- 2002 – 1st place in the European B’ Pool Championship
- 2003 – 2nd place in the European Men's Championship
- 2004 – 7th place in the Athens Olympic Games
- 2005 – 9th place in the European Championship
- 2005 – Although the team had qualified for the World Cup, no government funding forced the team to withdraw
- 2007 – (Although the team had qualified for the European Championship, Greece was forced to withdraw)
- 2008 – 1st place in the European B’ Pool Qualification Tournament
- 2010 – 4th place in the European Championship
- 2011 – 15th place in the World Cup
- 2012 – 7th place in the European Championship
- 2014 – 10th place in the European Championship

== Current roster ==
Greece roster
Official roster		Coaching staff
Pitchers: 1 Evan Dean Christidis; 21 Daniel Peter Gosselin; 57 Alex Gounaris; 3 Yanni Orfanidis; 15 Panagiotis Sykaras; 28 Noah Hoadly Day Zavolas	Catchers: 6 George Pavlos Athanasiadis; Infielders: 17 Andre Christopher Demetral; Outfielders: 29 Kasey Caras; 26 Louka Soukeras; 2 Hondro Torres; 19 Andrew Nicholas Varon	Manager: 4 James Christopher Demetral; Coaches: 18 Scott Demetral; 32 Demetre Kokoris; 31 Tom Mazarakis; 8 Erik Pappas; 20 Stavros Spyrou
Updated 13 October 2026

== Current league structure ==
- A DIVISION - ACTIVE TEAMS
  - Aris Baseball Club (Thessaloniki)
  - Milonas Neas Smyrnis (Smyrna)
  - Eyriali Glyfadas (Athens)
  - Dias Patron (Patron)
  - Olympiada Peristeriou (Athens)
  - Panathinaikos A.O. (Athens)
  - Marousi 2004 (Marousi)
  - Leaders Vouliagmenis(Vouliagmeni)
  - AEL Baseball

(Larissa)

- NON RECENT ACTIVITY TEAMS
  - Zeus Kalamarias (Thessaloniki)
  - A.O. Seirios Paralias (Patras)
  - Thiseas Patron (Patras)
  - Galini (Patras)
  - Filathlitiki Lesxi Aigiou (Aigio)
  - A.O. Leontes Peiraios (Athens)
  - Titanes Olympismou (Athens)
  - Pelopas Patron (Patras)
  - Ainos Kefalonias (Kefalonia)
  - Olympiada Peristeriou (Athens)
  - Spartakos Glyfadas (Athens)
  - Panthers Patras (Patras)
  - A.O.N.S Milon (Athens)

== See also ==
- Baseball awards#Greece
- Baseball awards#Europe
