= George Soulis =

Greek Canadian, data recovery specialist, baseball player and entrepreneur

- Born: February 19, 1976 (age 50); Montreal, Quebec, Canada
- Occupation: CEO of DataRecall International
- Website: www.datarecall.gr

George Soulis (born February 19, 1976) is a Greek Canadian, data recovery specialist, baseball player and entrepreneur. He is the founder and CEO of DataRecall International Data Recovery Services.DataRecall International is based in Athens Greece, and holds offices in Munich, Germany and Montreal, Quebec.

== Early life ==
Born in Montreal, Quebec, Soulis grew up on the island of Montreal's North District where he attended Elementary, High School and some college. At age 20 he moved to Athens Greece where he started University and obtained a bachelor's degree in Computer Information systems. From then onwards he has worked Internationally in the IT Field, more specifically the Data Recovery Field. Having traveled and worked in countries like Canada, Israel, Belgium, France and finally Greece, Soulis has obtained a considerable amount of experience in International Business.

== Baseball career ==
George Soulis is also a baseball player. He is an outfielder for the Panathinaikos Baseball Club which is a member team of the Greek Baseball League. The department of Panathinaikos baseball was created in March 2014. The first official appearance of the team was the participation in the Greek Cup games against Aris Baseball Club Aris Thessaloniki.

Soulis also played for the Greece national baseball team in the 2014 European Baseball Championship. His batting average for the tournament was 0.333. That year the team finished in 10th place. Soulis was also on the Greece national baseball team roster for the 2016 European Baseball Championship.

== Personal life ==
Soulis resides in Athens, Greece.
