= List of Uchu Sentai Kyuranger episodes =

Uchu Sentai Kyuranger is a 2017 Japanese television series, and is the 41st entry of the long-running Super Sentai series produced by TV Asahi and Toei Company. Taking place in the late 21st century, the series follows a team of alien warriors chosen by the constellations to fight Jark Matter, an evil organization that has taken over the galaxy.

== Episodes ==
The episodes are denominated "Spaces", according to the series' space motif.

Space	English title Original Japanese title	Written by	Original release date
1	"The Universe's Number One Super Star"; Transliteration: "Uchū-ichi no Sūpā Sutā" (Japanese: 宇宙一のスーパスター)	Nobuhiro Mouri	February 12, 2017
To liberate the universe from the Space Shogunate Jark Matter's occupation, Champ, Hammie and Spada, three members of the Kyurangers search around space for the six other individuals chosen by the power of the Kyutama to join their cause. Their quest leads them to meet Lucky, a space traveler and Garu, a wolf-man whose entire clan was decimated by Jark Matter who also transform into Kyurangers once they unlock the powers of their own Kyutama as well.
2	"Let's Go! The BN Thieves"; Transliteration: "Ikuze! Kaitō Bī Enu-dan" (Japanese: いくぜっ！怪盗BN団)	Nobuhiro Mouri	February 19, 2017
While looking for the four other Kyurangers, Lucky and his friends come across Balance and Naga Ray, a duo of thieves, just as Eriedrone, one of the Karos from Jark Matter is hot on their trail.
3	"The Man from the Desert Planet"; Transliteration: "Sabaku no Hoshi kara Kita Otoko" (Japanese: 砂漠の星からきた男)	Nobuhiro Mouri	February 26, 2017
After meeting their Commander Shou Ronpo, Lucky and the others find the 8th Kyuranger, Stinger. But Stinger refuses to join their side and attacks them instead.
4	"The Dreaming Android"; Transliteration: "Yume Miru Andoroido" (Japanese: 夢みるアンドロイド)	Nobuhiro Mouri	March 5, 2017
Raptor 283, the pilot of the Kyurangers' ship, dreams of fighting by their side to save the galaxy. Little does she know that her dream is closer to becoming reality than she could ever guess.
5	"The Nine Ultimate Saviors"; Transliteration: "Kyūnin no Kyūkyoku no Kyūseishu" (Japanese: 9人の究極の救世主)	Nobuhiro Mouri	March 12, 2017
With eight members in their team, the Kyurangers confront Eriedrone and Stinger. In the occasion, Stinger reveals his true side and joins the Kyurangers against Jark Matter.
6	"Flap! Dancing Star!"; Transliteration: "Habatake! Danshingu Sutā!" (Japanese: はばたけ！ダンシングスター！)	Nobuhiro Mouri	March 19, 2017
Now with the team complete, the Kyurangers decide to start their campaign to liberate the universe with Earth. Lucky obtains the Pegasus Kyutama that grants him a special armor. However, he fails to control it and the team takes part in a rather unusual training routine to help him master it as they encounter the powerful Ikargen and Mardakko.
7	"Take Back the Birthday!"; Transliteration: "Tanjōbi o Torimodose!" (Japanese: 誕生日をとりもどせ！)	Nobuhiro Mouri	March 26, 2017
Part 1 of "Kamen Rider × Super Sentai: Ultra Super Hero Taisen Movie Roadshow Commemoration Special". The Kyurangers face a new enemy that restricts birthday celebrations, and Lucky uses a unique Kyutama to call for some special help.
8	"The Secret of Commander Shou Ronpo"; Transliteration: "Shireikan Shō Ronpō no Himitsu" (Japanese: 司令官ショウ・ロンポーの秘密)	Nobuhiro Mouri	April 2, 2017
Shou sends the Kyurangers to wipe out five enemy outposts at once. Meanwhile, Spada decides to help the population's suffering with his cooking. But when Ikargen and Mardakko appear, Shou himself intervenes just in time to everyone's surprise.
9	"Burn, Dragon Ma-Star"; Transliteration: "Moeyo Doragon Masutā" (Japanese: 燃えよドラゴンマスター)	Nobuhiro Mouri	April 9, 2017
Spada is captured by Ikargen and Mardakko, and Shou, having finally perfected his transformation into a Kyuranger, joins the others to rescue him.
10	"The Small Giant, Big Star!"; Transliteration: "Chiisana Kyojin, Biggu Sutā!" (Japanese: 小さな巨人、ビッグスター！)	Nobuhiro Mouri	April 16, 2017
As the other Kyurangers face a crisis when the Orion goes haywire, Lucky takes Kotaro back to Earth, but when they are attacked by the enemy, Big Bear's spirit appears to them, and after witnessing Kotaro's true determination to protect the world, grants him the power to fight as the 11th Kyuranger.
11	"Three Kyutamas to Save the Universe"; Transliteration: "Uchū o Sukū Mittsu no Kyūtama" (Japanese: 宇宙を救う3つのキュータマ)	Nobuhiro Mouri	April 23, 2017
Shou informs the other Kyurangers of their next move, which is to assemble three special Kyutamas that together, unlock the power of the legendary spaceship "Argo", necessary to bring down Jark Matter. However, Lucky has an unusual string of bad luck and trying to prove himself despite that, he confronts Ikargen and the revived Mardakko alone.
12	"The Eleven Ultimate All-Stars"; Transliteration: "Jūichinin no Kyūkyoku no Ōru Sutā" (Japanese: 11人の究極のオールスター)	Nobuhiro Mouri	April 30, 2017
After Ikargen steals the Tomo Kyutama from the Kyurangers, the team looks for a way to get past his mysterious ability to evade all their attacks. Shou comes with an idea to outsmart him, but Lucky is still shaken by his string of bad luck and stays behind, until he decides to bring up his courage and fight back.
13	"Stinger, a Challenge to the Brother"; Transliteration: "Sutingā, Ani e no Chōsen" (Japanese: スティンガー、兄への挑戦)	Nobuhiro Mouri	May 7, 2017
After reclaiming the Tomo Kyutama, the Kyurangers must wait for the Rashinban Kyutama to recharge in order to look for the next piece of the Argo and take their time continuing with their campaign against Jark Matter's forces on Earth. However, their next enemy is Scorpio, the Karo of the Scorpius System and Stinger's older brother, who uses his poison to transform his victims into zombies.
14	"Dancing! Space Dragon Palace Castle!"; Transliteration: "Odoru! Uchū Ryūgū-jō!" (Japanese: おどる！宇宙竜宮城！)	Kento Shimoyama	May 14, 2017
With Stinger and Champ looking for Scorpio and Kotaro temporarily absent for training, the other Kyurangers' next mission is to rescue the people imprisoned at the Space Dragon Palace Castle. Garu, who is upset because he has not been chosen for deployment lately, has his wish granted when the Kyulette selects him to join the Palace's infiltration team.
15	"The Savior of Water Planet Vela"; Transliteration: "Umi no Wakusei Bera no Kyūseishu" (Japanese: 海の惑星ベラの救世主)	Nobuhiro Mouri	May 21, 2017
The Kyurangers track down the location of the Ho Kyutama, one of the components of Argo, on Planet Vela, whose people are suffering with the pollution caused by Jark Matter. Meanwhile, Stinger finally comes face to face with his brother.
16	"Stinger, Reunion With the Brother"; Transliteration: "Sutingā, Ani to no Saikai" (Japanese: スティンガー、兄との再会)	Nobuhiro Mouri	May 28, 2017
Stinger and Champ are eager to settle their scores with Scorpio, but he approaches Stinger instead and tells him that he is working inside Jark Matter to kill Don Armage instead. Stinger agrees to listen to him, unaware of his true intentions.
17	"Lighting the Dome of Darkness!"; Transliteration: "Yami no Dōmu o Terashitaiyō!" (Japanese: 闇のドームを照らしタイヨウ！)	Naruhisa Arakawa	June 4, 2017
Stinger accompanies Champ who was heavily damaged while protecting him from Scorpio for repairs. Meanwhile, the others have a hard time against a new enemy that can't be seen, until Lucky obtains a new, powerful Kyutama to fight back.
18	"Emergency Dispatch! Space Heroes!"; Transliteration: "Kinkyū Shutsudō! Supēsu Hīrō!" (Japanese: 緊急出動！スペースヒーロー！)	Naruhisa Arakawa	June 11, 2017
Mardakko steals the Rashinban Kyutama, that is necessary to find the final piece of Argo and the Kyurangers give chase, encountering Gavan Type-G and the Dekarangers along the way.
19	"The Elf of Forest Planet Keel"; Transliteration: "Mori no Wakusei Kīru no Seirei" (Japanese: 森の惑星キールの精霊)	Nobuhiro Mouri	June 25, 2017
The Kyurangers set out to look for the Ryukotsu Kyutama on Planet Keel, but Scorpio steals it and they must fight him for its possession.
20	"Stinger vs. Scorpio"; Transliteration: "Sutingā Tai Sukorupio" (Japanese: スティンガーVSスコルピオ)	Nobuhiro Mouri	July 2, 2017
Stinger returns to Earth to confront Scorpio alone but ends up controlled by his poison. Kotaro also returns and joins the other Kyurangers to help him.
21	"Goodbye, Scorpio! Time for Argo's Revival!"; Transliteration: "Saraba Sukorupio! Arugo-sen, Fukkatsu no Toki!" (Japanese: さらばスコルピオ！アルゴ船、復活の時！)	Nobuhiro Mouri	July 9, 2017
The Kyurangers have their decisive battle against Scorpio, and finally assemble the three Argo Kyutamas, gaining a new and powerful ally.
22	"The Legendary Savior's True Character"; Transliteration: "Densetsu no Kyūseishu no Shōtai" (Japanese: 伝説の救世主の正体)	Nobuhiro Mouri	July 23, 2017
After being brought back to life, Tsurugi Ohtori declares that the other Kyurangers had accomplished their duty and must leave the rest to him. However, Lucky and the others refuse to comply.
23	"Become My Shield!"; Transliteration: "Oresama no Tate ni Nare!" (Japanese: 俺様の盾になれ！)	Nobuhiro Mouri	July 30, 2017
Tsurugi hijacks a Jark Matter station to declare to the whole universe that he will defeat Don Armage once more. However, when he ends up risking civilians' lives, Lucky loses his patience towards him.
24	"I Will Become a Fighting Shield!"; Transliteration: "Ore wa Tatakau Tate ni Naru!" (Japanese: 俺は戦う盾になる！)	Nobuhiro Mouri	August 6, 2017
With several Kyurangers captured by Jark Matter, Lucky and Tsurugi must settle their differences and work together to rescue them. Tsurugi reminiscene about his old comrade, Quervo.
25	"Planet Toki! The Boy's Determination"; Transliteration: "Wakusei Toki! Shōnen no Ketsui" (Japanese: 惑星トキ！少年の決意)	Nobuhiro Mouri	August 13, 2017
Now with the 12 member team working together, the Kyurangers set to Planet Toki to reclaim a new Kyutama that allows them to travel through time. Once arriving there, Kotaro has an unexpected encounter with his mother.
26	"Warrior of Darkness, Hebitsukai Metal"; Transliteration: "Yami no Senshi, Hebitsukai Metaru" (Japanese: 闇の戦士、ヘビツカイメタル)	Nobuhiro Mouri	August 20, 2017
The Kyurangers take a day off to have some barbecue, when Akyanba, one of the Fuku Shoguns, approaches Naga and transforms him into an evil servant of hers.
27	"Indaver Panic Within the Orion!?"; Transliteration: "Orion-gō de Indabē Panikku!?" (Japanese: オリオン号でインダベーパニック!?)	Tete Inoue	August 27, 2017
While Lucky, Hammie, Garu, Balance and Kotaro stay in the present to rescue Naga from Akyanba's influence, the others travel to the past to discover Don Armage's secret, where they must deal with a group of trespassers aboard the Orion.
28	"The BN Thieves, Breakup..."; Transliteration: "Kaitō Bī Enu-dan, Kaisan..." (Japanese: 怪盗BN団、解散…)	Nobuhiro Mouri	September 3, 2017
Balance finds Naga, determined to risk himself to bring his friend back to senses. Meanwhile, Tsurugi and his group arrive at the past, seeking to learn what actually happened after his final battle against Don Armage.
29	"Orion, the Strongest Warrior"; Transliteration: "Orion-za, Saikyō no Senshi" (Japanese: オリオン座、最強の戦士)	Nobuhiro Mouri	September 10, 2017
Lucky finds a wrecked Orion in the present and sets for the past to discover what happened to Tsurugi and the others.
30	"All Right! The Miraculous Kyutama"; Transliteration: "Yossha! Kiseki no Kyūtama" (Japanese: ヨッシャ！奇跡のキュータマ)	Nobuhiro Mouri	September 17, 2017
Lucky and co. at last discover the truth about Don Armage, and Lucky, armed with a new Kyutama that bestows him the power of Orion, confronts him head on.
31	"The Great Naga Recovery Strategy!"; Transliteration: "Nāga Dakkan Dai Sakusen!" (Japanese: ナーガ奪還大作戦！)	Nobuhiro Mouri	September 24, 2017
Despite Don Armage was apparently destroyed in the past, the present has not changed at all, and the Kyurangers confront Akyanba to release Naga from her control.
32	"Orion, Forever"; Transliteration: "Orion-gō yo, Eien ni" (Japanese: オリオン号よ、永遠に)	Tete Inoue	October 1, 2017
Naga's back on the team and the information he got when he was under Akyanba's control may lead them to Don Armage. However, the Kyurangers also discover, much to their grief, that the Orion is damaged beyond repair, just when Kukuruga, the third of the Fuku Shoguns makes his move.
33	"Launch! Battle Orion Ship!"; Transliteration: "Hasshin! Batoru Orion Shippu!" (Japanese: 発進！バトルオリオンシップ！)	Nobuhiro Mouri	October 8, 2017
Despite having a glimpse of Don Armage's whereabouts, the Kyurangers have no way to go after him now that they lost the Orion, until Eris appears again, with news of another ship hidden on Earth, and upon finding it, they meet Shou Ronpo again.
34	"The Mysterious Masked Warrior Appears"; Transliteration: "Nazo no Fukumen Senshi, Arawaru" (Japanese: 謎の覆面戦士、現る)	Nobuhiro Mouri	October 15, 2017
The Kyurangers have obtained a new spaceship and Shou returned, but they have no clue of what happened to Champ. Just when Kukuruga attacks the Kyurangers with an android resembling him, a mysterious warrior appears to help them.
35	"The Secret of the Universe's No.1 Idol"; Transliteration: "Uchū Nanbā Wan Aidoru no Himitsu" (Japanese: 宇宙No.1アイドルの秘密)	Kento Shimoyama	October 22, 2017
The Kyurangers are reunited again and they set out for the Crux System to confront Don Armage. On the way there, they decide to infiltrate a competition held by Hoshi Minato, known as the greatest artist in the universe, to learn about his possible connection with Jark Matter.
36	"The Sleeping Legend in Lucky's Homeland"; Transliteration: "Rakkī no Kokyō ni Nemuru Densetsu" (Japanese: ラッキーの故郷に眠る伝説)	Nobuhiro Mouri	October 29, 2017
Still surprised with the recent revelations about Don Armage, the Kyurangers depart to answer a distress signal from Planet Ruz, where Lucky was raised.
37	"Lucky, Reunion With the Father"; Transliteration: "Rakkī, Chichi to no Saikai" (Japanese: ラッキー、父との再会)	Nobuhiro Mouri	November 12, 2017
Lucky learns from his foster father that his father, King Aslan has joined Jark Matter, and sets for his birthplace, Planet Kaien to confirm it.
38	"Holy Moly! The Nine Crises!"; Transliteration: "Ottamage! Kiki Kyū Renpatsu!" (Japanese: おっタマげ！危機9連発！)	Nobuhiro Mouri	November 19, 2017
After liberating Lucky's home planet, the Kyurangers split into two groups again, looking for the means to break into Planet Southern Cross to confront Don Armage, but Shou is starting to feel left out, as Tsurugi has been a better leader than him.
39	"The Great Adventure of Perseus"; Transliteration: "Peruseusu-za no Dai Bōken" (Japanese: ペルセウス座の大冒険)	Nobuhiro Mouri	November 26, 2017
Searching for the Perseus Kyutama, Lucky and his friends encounter Mardakko once again, and discover, much to their surprise, that Doctor Anton is still alive.
40	"Opening! Deathball of Hell"; Transliteration: "Kaimaku! Jigoku no Dēsubōru" (Japanese: 開幕！地獄のデースボール)	Nobuhiro Mouri	December 3, 2017
To obtain the last Kyutama needed to break Don Armage's barrier, the Kyurangers set for the Cassiopeia System, where the local Karo challenges them for a baseball match.
41	"Rushing! Planet Southern Cross"; Transliteration: "Totsunyū! Wakusei Sazan Kurosu" (Japanese: 突入！惑星サザンクロス)	Nobuhiro Mouri	December 10, 2017
With the power of the Andromeda, Cassiopeia, Cepheus and Perseus Kyutamas, the Kyurangers break into Planet Southern Cross chasing after Don Armage, where they encounter a mysterious masked assailant.
42	"The Father? The Universe? Lucky's Resolution"; Transliteration: "Chichi ka? Uchū ka? Rakkī no Kakugo" (Japanese: 父か？宇宙か？ラッキーの覚悟)	Nobuhiro Mouri	December 17, 2017
The mysterious warrior serving Jark Matter is no other than King Aslan, who is possessed by Don Armage. This fact shakes Lucky's conviction, until his friends decide to give him a piece of mind.
43	""Alright, Lucky" Sworn on the Holy Night"; Transliteration: "Seiya ni Chikau Yossha, Rakkī" (Japanese: 聖夜に誓うヨッシャ、ラッキー)	Nobuhiro Mouri	December 24, 2017
While Lucky confronts his father and Tsurugi faces Don Armage himself, the other Kyurangers rush to Planet Southern Cross' core to stop Don Armage's bomb, which is powerful enough to destroy the entire universe.
44	"Don Armage's Identity"; Transliteration: "Don Arumage no Shōtai" (Japanese: ドン・アルマゲの正体)	Nobuhiro Mouri	January 7, 2018
The Kyurangers have no clue about Don Armage's whereabouts since their last battle, until they hear of planets exploding mysteriously in the Corvus System and set course there, unaware that Tsurugi is keeping a secret from the others.
45	"Tsurugi's Life and Earth's Crisis"; Transliteration: "Tsurugi no Inochi to Chikyū no Kiki" (Japanese: ツルギの命とチキュウの危機)	Nobuhiro Mouri	January 14, 2018
The Kyurangers return to Earth to stop Don Armage's plan to destroy the universe, but as Tsurugi's condition worsens, Doctor Anton stands in their way. Anton transform into his monster form and enchant citizen to attack Kyurangers
46	"Between Hope and Despair"; Transliteration: "Kibō to Zetsubō no Hazama de" (Japanese: 希望と絶望のはざまで)	Nobuhiro Mouri	January 21, 2018
Still wary of Tsurugi's situation, the Kyurangers join together against Don Armage who is possessing Quervo's body.
47	"The Saviors' Promise"; Transliteration: "Kyūseishu-tachi no Yakusoku" (Japanese: 救世主たちの約束)	Nobuhiro Mouri	January 28, 2018
Now possessing Tsurugi's body, Don Armage absorbs Shou and is stronger than ever. Having a plan to rescue both from Don Armage's grasp, the remaining Kyurangers prepare themselves for the final battle.
48 (Final)	"Echo Throughout the Universe! Alright, Lucky"; Transliteration: "Uchū ni Hibike! Yossha, Rakkī" (Japanese: 宇宙に響け！ヨッシャ、ラッキー)	Nobuhiro Mouri	February 4, 2018
The Kyurangers are reunited once more and face Don Armage one last time to decide the fate of the universe.
