= Greek Championship Rugby Union =

First-tier men's rugby union League in Greece

Greek Rugby Union Championship
- Sport: Rugby Union
- Founded: 2005
- First season: 2005, 2024 (re-established)
- Folded: 2014
- No. of teams: 9
- Country: Greece
- Continent: (European Union) Europe
- Last champion: Panathinaikos Rugby
- Most titles: Athens RFC (6)

The Greek Rugby Union Championship is the most important domestic competition of rugby union in Greece. It started in 2005 and is organised by Greek Rugby Federation. During the period that championships were held, the most titles were won by Athens RFC and one title was won by Attica Springboks RFC and one by Iraklis Rugby.

== Abolishment of the Federation ==
The Hellenic Rugby Federation was abolished in 2014 due to the very low number of active clubs in the sport. and control of the sports development has since been handed over to the Hellenic Handball Federation which announced it would be setting up a development board with representatives of recognised clubs (currently Attica Springboks RFC, Athens Spartans RFC and Athens RFC) with a view to setting up a series of friendly matches between existing clubs until such time as enough teams exist so that an official championship can be set up.

== Titles ==
| Season | Champion |
|---|---|
| 2005-06 | Athens RFC |
| 2006-07 | Athens RFC |
| 2007-08 | Athens RFC |
| 2008-09 | Athens RFC |
| 2009-10 | Athens RFC |
| 2010-11 | Athens RFC |
| 2011-12 | Attica Springboks RFC |
| 2012-13 | Iraklis Thessaloniki |
| 2013-14 | not held |
| 2024-25 | Panathinaikos Rugby |
| 2025-26 | Panathinaikos Rugby |

=== Performance by club ===
| Club | Championships | Season |
|---|---|---|
| Athens RFC | 6 | 2006, 2007, 2008, 2009, 2010, 2011 |
| Panathinaikos Rugby | 2 | 2025, 2026 |
| Attica Springboks RFC | 1 | 2012 |
| Iraklis Thessaloniki | 1 | 2013 |
