= Rugby in Greece =

Rugby in Greece may refer to:

- Rugby league in Greece
- Rugby union in Greece
