= Panathinaikos Rugby =

Panathinaikos
- Nickname(s): The Trifolium; The Great Club
- Founded: 7 November 2013 (12 years, 354 days old)
- Location: Athens, Greece
- Ground: Leoforos Alexandras Stadium
- President: Dimitris Vranopoulos
- Director of Rugby: Alexandros Goules
- Coach: Giannis Rizos
1st kit	2nd kit

Official website
- www.pao1908.com

Panathinaikos AC Rugby Team is the professional Rugby team of Panathinaikos A.C., the Athens-based multi-sport club. Founded in 2013, it is one of the newest rugby teams in Greece.

== History ==
The first presence of the team took place in the season 2013-14 in the Unity Cup League and finished second after Attica Springboks RFC.

== Women's team ==
Panathinaikos, in 2014, created also a women's rugby union team. The first presence of the team was in a friendly game against Aeolos Rugby women's team.
