= Costa Christo Kapothanasis =

American-born baseball player (born 1988)

- Pitcher
- Born: April 6, 1988 (age 36); Portland, Maine
- Bats: Right Throws: Right

Costa Christo Kapothanasis is an American-born baseball player. He is a pitcher for the Panathinaikos Baseball Club which is a member team of the Greek Baseball League.

He was 3-1 with a 6.29 ERA as a Division I freshman then improved to 2-2, 6.17 in his second campaign, and 4-3, 5.06 as a junior. He fell to 2-7, 6.68 his senior year. Kapothanasis then joined the Greek National Baseball team for the 2010 European Baseball Championshipgoing 1-3 with a win over Sweden. He beat Sweden in his debut but lost to Croatia, Germany (on a bases-loaded walk to Ludwig Glaser and the Netherlands.

Kapothanasis also played for Greece in the 2012 European Baseball Championship, doing much better. He held the Greek lead with four appearances and tossed 7 1/3 shutout innings, getting the save in the 7th/8th place game over France. He was 5th in ERA for the 2012 European Baseball Championship, behind four other players with also no earned runs, but with more innings. Kapothanasis was also on the Greek roster for the Panama 2011 Baseball World Cup.

Kapothanasis played independent minor league baseball for the Albany Quails of the South Coast League (1-3, 4.43 in 2010) and the Pensacola Pelicans of the American Association.

Kapothanasis will be pitching for the Greek National Baseball in Prague, Czech Republic, for the 2014 European Baseball Championship.

== Sources ==
- Mount St. Mary's bio
- Greek Baseball Federation
- Panathinaikos Baseball Club
- 2010 Euros
- 2012 Euros
- 2014 European Baseball Championship
- Portland Press Herald
