= Panathinaikos Baseball =

Panathinaikos Baseball Club

Information
- League: Greek Baseball League
- Location: Athens, Greece
- Ballpark: Hellinikon Stadium
- Founded: March 2014
- Nickname(s): The Trifolium
- Colors: Green, White
- Manager: Tom Mazarakis
- Website: panathinaikos1908.gr

Current uniforms
Home	Away

Panathinaikos AC Baseball Team is a Greek baseball club. The current iteration was founded in 2014. Panathinaikos was the first club which organized a baseball game in Greece in 1946.

== History ==
After the end of World War II, Panathinaikos A.O attempted to create new sections in the stadium of Leoforou after they repaired it from the damages of Nazi occupation and placed headlights and the new sports ground at the junction of Queen Sophia and Tsoha. Among the sports that were selected was baseball, basketball and handball.

In April 1946, the USS Missouri sailed into the bay Phalericon. The Missouri had top sporting facilities aboard and exceptional athletes serving on its crew. Kostas Zogas, a Panathinaikos athlete, organized baseball, basketball and hockey games. On 11 April 1946 the Tennis Avenue hosted the first recorded baseball game in Greece between the American warships Missouri and Providence. The second baseball game in Greece was held on Golf Avenue on June 3, 1955. A team of Americans and Greek soldiers prevailed by a score of 14-10.

The department of Panathinaikos baseball was created in March 2014. The first official appearance of the team was the participation in the Greek Cup games against Aris Thessaloniki.

== Honours ==
- Greek Baseball League: (1)
  - 2014

== 2015 roster ==
Panathinaikos Baseball roster – Qualifier European Cup 2015
Active roster		Coaches
Pitchers: 13 Pete Sykaras; 14 Konstantinos Kapothanasis; 22 Alexandros Gounaris; 28 Theodoros Bourdaniotis; 77 Dimitris Chatzikiriakos	Catchers: 2 Keith Gilmour; 27 Georgios Pipergias; Infielders: 3 Peter Tountas; 8 Nikos Mazarakis; 12 Thomas Lekas; 21 Akhtar Rasool; 30 Panagiotis Cheilakis; 31 Alexandros Panagiotarakos; Outfielders: 5 Michael Luna; 7 Georgios Soulis; 9 Konstantinos Skrimponis; 10 Georgios Tsouloufas; 17 Spiros Pashalis Ghizas; 19 Athanasios Konstas; 20 Max Gouoren; 33 Athanasios Markou; 42 Manolis Mazarakis; 38 Iasonas Zachos; 66 Garifalos Fradelos	Manager: 54 Tom Mazarakis; Coaches: 35 Nikolaos Antoniadis

Source: baseballstats.eu
