= Atsuki Tani =

Japanese actor, voice actor and narrator (born 1959)

- 谷 昌樹
- Born: January 22, 1959 (age 67); Tokyo, Japan
- Occupations: Actor; voice actor; narrator
- Years active: 1983–present
- Agent: Aoni Production
- Height: 172 cm (5 ft 8 in)

Atsuki Tani (谷 昌樹, Tani Atsuki; born January 22, 1959) is a Japanese actor, voice actor and narrator. He is known for doing the Japanese voice of Master Chief in the Halo Original Trilogy.

== Filmography ==
=== Television animation ===
- Tweeny Witches (2004) (Jidan)
- Kekkaishi (2007) (Tessai Shishio)
- Fullmetal Alchemist: Brotherhood (2009) (Master Hawkeye)
- Majin Bone (2014) (Stolz / Dark Phoenix)
- Sanzoku no Musume Rōnya (2014) (Borka)
- Cheer Boys!! (2016) (Haruki's father)
- Dragon Ball Super (2017) (Obuni)
- Altair: A Record of Battles (2017) (Apollodorus)
- GeGeGe no Kitarō 6th series (2018) (Dorotabō (ep 54)
- One Piece: Episode of Sky Island (2018) (Dr. Honner)
- Carole & Tuesday (2019) (Dann)
- Great Pretender (2020) (Inspector Anderson)
- Hortensia Saga (2021) (Georg Dalmas)
- Delicious Party Pretty Cure (2022) (Genma Itak)

=== Tokusatsu ===
- Kyuukyuu Sentai GoGo Five (1999) (Smog Psyma Beast Chanbaano) (ep 10)
- Mirai Sentai Timeranger (2000) (Mercenary Org) (ep 10)
- Uchu Sentai Kyuranger (2017) (Shougun DonArmage) (eps 1, 4, 8, 12 - 13, 15, 19, 21 - 25, 28 - 32, 35, 38, 41 - 48)

=== OVA ===
- Mobile Suit Gundam Unicorn (2014) (Ablus)

=== Video games ===
- Halo (Japanese dub, 2002) (Master Chief)
- God of War (Japanese dub, 2005) (Ares)
- Ace Combat: Assault Horizon (Japanese dub, 2011) (Andrei Markov)
- Time Travelers (2012) (Joji Nonaka)
- Super Robot Wars T (2019) (Dr.Hell)
- Xenoblade Chronicles 3: Future Redeemed (2023) (Consul W)

=== Dubbing roles ===
==== Live-action ====
- Liam Neeson
  - The Commuter (Michael MacCauley)
  - Cold Pursuit (Nels Coxman)
  - Honest Thief (Tom Dolan)
  - The Ice Road (Mike McCann)
  - Blacklight (Travis Block)
  - Retribution (Matt Turner)
- Mark Strong
  - Mindscape (John Washington)
  - Welcome to the Punch (Jacob Sternwood)
  - Before I Go to Sleep (Dr. Nasch)
- Act of Valor (Abu Shabal)
- Almost Human (Detective Richard Paul (Michael Irby))
- Amsterdam (Henry Norcross (Michael Shannon))
- Around the World in 80 Days (Nyle Bellamy (Peter Sullivan))
- Audrey (Sean Hepburn Ferrer)
- Catch Me If You Can (Jack Barnes (James Brolin))
- The Core (Dr. Conrad Zimsky (Stanley Tucci))
- District 9 (Colonel Koobus Venter (David James))
- Downton Abbey (John Bates (Brendan Coyle))
- Dragonfly (Hugh Campbell (Joe Morton))
- Dunkirk (Commander Bolton (Kenneth Branagh))
- Escape Room: Tournament of Champions (Henry (James Frain))
- Five Nights at Freddy's (Steve Raglan / William Afton (Matthew Lillard))
- Force of Execution (Ice Man (Ving Rhames))
- Forsaken (Gentleman Dave Turner (Michael Wincott))
- The Frozen Ground (Sgt. Lyle Haugsven (Dean Norris))
- Guardians of the Galaxy (The Other (Alexis Denisof))
- Hellboy (Grigori Rasputin (Karel Roden))
- Hugo (Policeman (Kevin Eldon))
- Inheritance (Morgan Warner / Carson Thomas (Simon Pegg))
- Lilacs (Sergei (Yevgeny Tsyganov))
- Machine Gun Preacher (Deng (Souléymane Sy Savané))
- Mackenna's Gold (Sergeant Tibbs (Telly Savalas))
- Mutant World (Mads (David LeReaney))
- The Naked Gun (Richard Cane (Danny Huston))
- Neruda (Gabriel González Videla (Alfredo Castro))
- No Country for Old Men (Anton Chigurh (Javier Bardem))
- Nobody (The Barber (Colin Salmon))
- The Perfect Weapon (Controller (Richard Tyson))
- Predators (Nikolai (Oleg Taktarov))
- Punch-Drunk Love (Dean Trumbell (Philip Seymour Hoffman))
- River Queen (Te Kai Po (Temuera Morrison))
- Saw II (Rigg (Lyriq Bent))
- Scorpion (Agent Cabe Gallo (Robert Patrick))
- Taken (Mark Casey (Jon Gries))
- The Third Man (New Era Movies edition) (Major Calloway (Trevor Howard))
- Transformers: Dark of the Moon (Defense Secretary McNamara)
- True Detective (Detective Martin Hart (Woody Harrelson))
- True Grit (Tom Chaney (Josh Brolin))
- Vincenzo (Hong Yoo-chan (Yoo Jae-myung))
- X-Men: First Class (Azazel (Jason Flemyng))

==== Animation ====
- Halo Legends (Master Chief)
- Happy Feet Two (Memphis)
- Justice League (General Wells)
- Love, Death & Robots (The Cat, Turk)
- Trese (Datu Talagbusao)
