= Terpsithea, Glyfada =

Municipality in Glyfada, Attica, Greece

Terpsithea (Τερψιθέα) is the northernmost settlement of the municipality of Glyfada in Athens, Greece. It lies on foot of the mountain Hymettus and has an altitude between 120 and 250 m. The name comes from the Greek words Terpsi+thea (τέρψη+θέα) and broadly means pleasure upon gazing, presumably due to the views from the area.

== Climate ==
There is at least one automated meteorological station in Terpsithea, Glyfada, that gave the following averages (1995-2006):

Month	Jan	Feb	Mar	Apr	May	Jun	Jul	Aug	Sep	Oct	Nov	Dec
Mean max temp	12.1°C	13.2°C	15.0°C	19.1°C	26.1°C	30.9°C	33.4°C	33.0°C	27.5°C	22.4°C	17.7°C	13.8°C
Mean min temp	6.4°C	6.4°C	8.1°C	10.8°C	16.4°C	20.9°C	23.7°C	23.4°C	19.4°C	15.2°C	11.3°C	8.4°C
Days with precipitation	12.2	10.3	10.3	8	5.4	2.4	2.4	2.2	4.6	5.1	9.2	12.4
Snow days	3.1	3.5	2.0	0.2	0	0	0	0	0	0	0.5	2.6
Precipitation (mm)	81.8	47.0	78.6	34.5	15.7	4.5	12.1	6.1	21.6	35.2	97.6	88.2
