= Uchu Sentai Kyuranger =

Television series

- Genre: Tokusatsu; Superhero fiction; Action; Science fiction; Dystopian fiction; Epic
- Created by: TV Asahi; Toei Company
- Written by: Nobuhiro Mouri; Kento Shimoyama; Naruhisa Arakawa; Tete Inoue
- Directed by: Takayuki Shibasaki; Noboru Takemoto; Teruaki Sugihara; Hiroyuki Kato; Kazuhiro Sugami
- Starring: Takumi Kizu; Yosuke Kishi; Taiki Yamazaki; Sakurako Okubo; Tetsuji Sakakibara; Shota Taguchi; Keisuke Minami
- Voices of: Kazuya Nakai; Yūki Ono; Akio Ōtsuka; M·A·O; Hiroshi Kamiya; Atsuki Tani
- Narrated by: Subaru Kimura
- Opening theme: "Lucky Star"; Performed by Tomohiro Hatano (Project.R)
- Ending theme: "Kyutama Dancing!" Performed by Tsuyoshi Matsubara (Project.R); "Kyutama Ondo!" Performed by Tsuyoshi Matsubara (Project.R)
- Composer: Kousuke Yamashita
- Country of origin: Japan
- Original language: Japanese
- No. of episodes: 48 (list of episodes)

Production
- Executive producer: Motoi Sasaki (TV Asahi)
- Producers: Chihiro Inoue (TV Asahi); Takashi Mochizuki (Toei); Kōichi Yada (Toei Agency); Akihiro Fukada (Toei Agency)
- Production location: Tokyo, Japan (Greater Tokyo Area)
- Running time: 24–25 minutes
- Production companies: TV Asahi; Toei Company; Toei Agency

Original release
- Network: TV Asahi
- Release: February 12, 2017 – February 4, 2018

Related
- Doubutsu Sentai Zyuohger; Kaitou Sentai Lupinranger VS Keisatsu Sentai Patranger

Uchu Sentai Kyuranger (宇宙戦隊キュウレンジャー, Uchū Sentai Kyūrenjā; Space Squadron Kyuranger) is a Japanese tokusatsu drama and the 41st entry of Toei's long-running Super Sentai metaseries. It aired from February 12, 2017, to February 4, 2018, replacing Doubutsu Sentai Zyuohger and was replaced by Kaitou Sentai Lupinranger VS Keisatsu Sentai Patranger. The program joining Kamen Rider Ex-Aid and later Kamen Rider Build in the Super Hero Time line-up on TV Asahi affiliate stations. Kyuranger is considered the fifth and final space-themed series (Note: Other official space-themed Super Sentai include Dengeki Sentai Changeman, Choushinsei Flashman, Chikyu Sentai Fiveman, and Denji Sentai Megaranger.) whose primary motifs are constellations and Greco-Roman mythology. It is also the only Super Sentai series to introduce nine regular members in the beginning instead of five or fewer like previous installments. The team later gains three additional members, increasing the number to twelve and becoming the largest team of the franchise.

Kyuranger began airing in South Korea as Power Rangers Galaxy Force. It also began airing in Indonesia in April 2019 as Kyuuranger.

Footage from Kyuranger was later reused for the third season of Power Rangers Dino Fury, renamed Power Rangers Cosmic Fury. However, much like Gosei Sentai Dairanger, only the footage pertaining to the mecha is used, with Cosmic Fury using original costume designs for the Rangers.

== Story ==
In a universe where Earth and other countless planets have been conquered by the Jark Matter organization under the mysterious Don Armage, an insurgent force called "Rebellion" is established and gathers nine alien warriors from across the galaxy who are chosen by the Kyutama, magical stones with the power of the constellations, to become the Kyurangers; the humanoids Lucky, Stinger, Naga Ray, Hammie, and Spada, the wolf-man Garu, the mechanical lifeform Balance, and the androids Champ and Raptor 283. Once assembled, the Kyurangers decide to start their campaign against Jark Matter by liberating Earth (their first target), as they are suspicious of why the planet is so heavily guarded by their forces. The team later gains three other members; their commander, the dragon-like alien Shou Ronpo, a young boy from Earth named Kotaro Sakuma, and Tsurugi Ohtori, a legendary warrior who defeated Jark Matter 300 years ago and was put to sleep until he is reawakened by the other Kyurangers.

== Episodes ==
Space	English title Original Japanese title	Written by	Original release date
1	"The Universe's Number One Super Star"; Transliteration: "Uchū-ichi no Sūpā Sutā" (Japanese: 宇宙一のスーパスター)	Nobuhiro Mouri	February 12, 2017
2	"Let's Go! The BN Thieves"; Transliteration: "Ikuze! Kaitō Bī Enu-dan" (Japanese: いくぜっ！怪盗BN団)	Nobuhiro Mouri	February 19, 2017
3	"The Man from the Desert Planet"; Transliteration: "Sabaku no Hoshi kara Kita Otoko" (Japanese: 砂漠の星からきた男)	Nobuhiro Mouri	February 26, 2017
4	"The Dreaming Android"; Transliteration: "Yume Miru Andoroido" (Japanese: 夢みるアンドロイド)	Nobuhiro Mouri	March 5, 2017
5	"The Nine Ultimate Saviors"; Transliteration: "Kyūnin no Kyūkyoku no Kyūseishu" (Japanese: 9人の究極の救世主)	Nobuhiro Mouri	March 12, 2017
6	"Flap! Dancing Star!"; Transliteration: "Habatake! Danshingu Sutā!" (Japanese: はばたけ！ダンシングスター！)	Nobuhiro Mouri	March 19, 2017
7	"Take Back the Birthday!"; Transliteration: "Tanjōbi o Torimodose!" (Japanese: 誕生日をとりもどせ！)	Nobuhiro Mouri	March 26, 2017
8	"The Secret of Commander Shou Ronpo"; Transliteration: "Shireikan Shō Ronpō no Himitsu" (Japanese: 司令官ショウ・ロンポーの秘密)	Nobuhiro Mouri	April 2, 2017
9	"Burn, Dragon Ma-Star"; Transliteration: "Moeyo Doragon Masutā" (Japanese: 燃えよドラゴンマスター)	Nobuhiro Mouri	April 9, 2017
10	"The Small Giant, Big Star!"; Transliteration: "Chiisana Kyojin, Biggu Sutā!" (Japanese: 小さな巨人、ビッグスター！)	Nobuhiro Mouri	April 16, 2017
11	"Three Kyutamas to Save the Universe"; Transliteration: "Uchū o Sukū Mittsu no Kyūtama" (Japanese: 宇宙を救う3つのキュータマ)	Nobuhiro Mouri	April 23, 2017
12	"The Eleven Ultimate All-Stars"; Transliteration: "Jūichinin no Kyūkyoku no Ōru Sutā" (Japanese: 11人の究極のオールスター)	Nobuhiro Mouri	April 30, 2017
13	"Stinger, a Challenge to the Brother"; Transliteration: "Sutingā, Ani e no Chōsen" (Japanese: スティンガー、兄への挑戦)	Nobuhiro Mouri	May 7, 2017
14	"Dancing! Space Dragon Palace Castle!"; Transliteration: "Odoru! Uchū Ryūgū-jō!" (Japanese: おどる！宇宙竜宮城！)	Kento Shimoyama	May 14, 2017
15	"The Savior of Water Planet Vela"; Transliteration: "Umi no Wakusei Bera no Kyūseishu" (Japanese: 海の惑星ベラの救世主)	Nobuhiro Mouri	May 21, 2017
16	"Stinger, Reunion With the Brother"; Transliteration: "Sutingā, Ani to no Saikai" (Japanese: スティンガー、兄との再会)	Nobuhiro Mouri	May 28, 2017
17	"Lighting the Dome of Darkness!"; Transliteration: "Yami no Dōmu o Terashitaiyō!" (Japanese: 闇のドームを照らしタイヨウ！)	Naruhisa Arakawa	June 4, 2017
18	"Emergency Dispatch! Space Heroes!"; Transliteration: "Kinkyū Shutsudō! Supēsu Hīrō!" (Japanese: 緊急出動！スペースヒーロー！)	Naruhisa Arakawa	June 11, 2017
19	"The Elf of Forest Planet Keel"; Transliteration: "Mori no Wakusei Kīru no Seirei" (Japanese: 森の惑星キールの精霊)	Nobuhiro Mouri	June 25, 2017
20	"Stinger vs. Scorpio"; Transliteration: "Sutingā Tai Sukorupio" (Japanese: スティンガーVSスコルピオ)	Nobuhiro Mouri	July 2, 2017
21	"Goodbye, Scorpio! Time for Argo's Revival!"; Transliteration: "Saraba Sukorupio! Arugo-sen, Fukkatsu no Toki!" (Japanese: さらばスコルピオ！アルゴ船、復活の時！)	Nobuhiro Mouri	July 9, 2017
22	"The Legendary Savior's True Character"; Transliteration: "Densetsu no Kyūseishu no Shōtai" (Japanese: 伝説の救世主の正体)	Nobuhiro Mouri	July 23, 2017
23	"Become My Shield!"; Transliteration: "Oresama no Tate ni Nare!" (Japanese: 俺様の盾になれ！)	Nobuhiro Mouri	July 30, 2017
24	"I Will Become a Fighting Shield!"; Transliteration: "Ore wa Tatakau Tate ni Naru!" (Japanese: 俺は戦う盾になる！)	Nobuhiro Mouri	August 6, 2017
25	"Planet Toki! The Boy's Determination"; Transliteration: "Wakusei Toki! Shōnen no Ketsui" (Japanese: 惑星トキ！少年の決意)	Nobuhiro Mouri	August 13, 2017
26	"Warrior of Darkness, Hebitsukai Metal"; Transliteration: "Yami no Senshi, Hebitsukai Metaru" (Japanese: 闇の戦士、ヘビツカイメタル)	Nobuhiro Mouri	August 20, 2017
27	"Indaver Panic Within the Orion!?"; Transliteration: "Orion-gō de Indabē Panikku!?" (Japanese: オリオン号でインダベーパニック!?)	Tete Inoue	August 27, 2017
28	"The BN Thieves, Breakup..."; Transliteration: "Kaitō Bī Enu-dan, Kaisan..." (Japanese: 怪盗BN団、解散…)	Nobuhiro Mouri	September 3, 2017
29	"Orion, the Strongest Warrior"; Transliteration: "Orion-za, Saikyō no Senshi" (Japanese: オリオン座、最強の戦士)	Nobuhiro Mouri	September 10, 2017
30	"All Right! The Miraculous Kyutama"; Transliteration: "Yossha! Kiseki no Kyūtama" (Japanese: ヨッシャ！奇跡のキュータマ)	Nobuhiro Mouri	September 17, 2017
31	"The Great Naga Recovery Strategy!"; Transliteration: "Nāga Dakkan Dai Sakusen!" (Japanese: ナーガ奪還大作戦！)	Nobuhiro Mouri	September 24, 2017
32	"Orion, Forever"; Transliteration: "Orion-gō yo, Eien ni" (Japanese: オリオン号よ、永遠に)	Tete Inoue	October 1, 2017
33	"Launch! Battle Orion Ship!"; Transliteration: "Hasshin! Batoru Orion Shippu!" (Japanese: 発進！バトルオリオンシップ！)	Nobuhiro Mouri	October 8, 2017
34	"The Mysterious Masked Warrior Appears"; Transliteration: "Nazo no Fukumen Senshi, Arawaru" (Japanese: 謎の覆面戦士、現る)	Nobuhiro Mouri	October 15, 2017
35	"The Secret of the Universe's No.1 Idol"; Transliteration: "Uchū Nanbā Wan Aidoru no Himitsu" (Japanese: 宇宙No.1アイドルの秘密)	Kento Shimoyama	October 22, 2017
36	"The Sleeping Legend in Lucky's Homeland"; Transliteration: "Rakkī no Kokyō ni Nemuru Densetsu" (Japanese: ラッキーの故郷に眠る伝説)	Nobuhiro Mouri	October 29, 2017
37	"Lucky, Reunion With the Father"; Transliteration: "Rakkī, Chichi to no Saikai" (Japanese: ラッキー、父との再会)	Nobuhiro Mouri	November 12, 2017
38	"Holy Moly! The Nine Crises!"; Transliteration: "Ottamage! Kiki Kyū Renpatsu!" (Japanese: おっタマげ！危機9連発！)	Nobuhiro Mouri	November 19, 2017
39	"The Great Adventure of Perseus"; Transliteration: "Peruseusu-za no Dai Bōken" (Japanese: ペルセウス座の大冒険)	Nobuhiro Mouri	November 26, 2017
40	"Opening! Deathball of Hell"; Transliteration: "Kaimaku! Jigoku no Dēsubōru" (Japanese: 開幕！地獄のデースボール)	Nobuhiro Mouri	December 3, 2017
41	"Rushing! Planet Southern Cross"; Transliteration: "Totsunyū! Wakusei Sazan Kurosu" (Japanese: 突入！惑星サザンクロス)	Nobuhiro Mouri	December 10, 2017
42	"The Father? The Universe? Lucky's Resolution"; Transliteration: "Chichi ka? Uchū ka? Rakkī no Kakugo" (Japanese: 父か？宇宙か？ラッキーの覚悟)	Nobuhiro Mouri	December 17, 2017
43	""Alright, Lucky" Sworn on the Holy Night"; Transliteration: "Seiya ni Chikau Yossha, Rakkī" (Japanese: 聖夜に誓うヨッシャ、ラッキー)	Nobuhiro Mouri	December 24, 2017
44	"Don Armage's Identity"; Transliteration: "Don Arumage no Shōtai" (Japanese: ドン・アルマゲの正体)	Nobuhiro Mouri	January 7, 2018
45	"Tsurugi's Life and Earth's Crisis"; Transliteration: "Tsurugi no Inochi to Chikyū no Kiki" (Japanese: ツルギの命とチキュウの危機)	Nobuhiro Mouri	January 14, 2018
46	"Between Hope and Despair"; Transliteration: "Kibō to Zetsubō no Hazama de" (Japanese: 希望と絶望のはざまで)	Nobuhiro Mouri	January 21, 2018
47	"The Saviors' Promise"; Transliteration: "Kyūseishu-tachi no Yakusoku" (Japanese: 救世主たちの約束)	Nobuhiro Mouri	January 28, 2018
48 (Final)	"Echo Throughout the Universe! Alright, Lucky"; Transliteration: "Uchū ni Hibike! Yossha, Rakkī" (Japanese: 宇宙に響け！ヨッシャ、ラッキー)	Nobuhiro Mouri	February 4, 2018

== Production ==
The trademark for the series was filed by Toei Company on August 29, 2016.

== Films and Specials ==
The Kyurangers made their first appearance as a cameo in the crossover film Doubutsu Sentai Zyuohger vs. Ninninger the Movie: Super Sentai's Message from the Future.

=== Theatrical ===
==== Ultra Super Hero Taisen ====
A crossover film, titled Kamen Rider × Super Sentai: Ultra Super Hero Taisen (仮面ライダー×スーパー戦隊 超スーパーヒーロー大戦, Kamen Raidā × Supā Sentai Chō Supā Hīrō Taisen) featuring the casts of Kamen Rider Ex-Aid, Amazon Riders, Uchu Sentai Kyuranger, and Doubutsu Sentai Zyuohger, was released in Japan on March 25, 2017. This movie also celebrates the tenth anniversary of Kamen Rider Den-O and features the spaceship Andor Genesis from the Xevious game, which is used by the movie's main antagonists, as well as introduces the movie-exclusive Kamen Rider True Brave, played by Kamen Rider Brave's actor Toshiki Seto from Kamen Rider Ex-Aid, and the villain Shocker Great Leader III, played by the singer Diamond Yukai. In addition, individual actors from older Kamen Rider and Super Sentai TV series, Ryohei Odai (Kamen Rider Ryuki), Gaku Matsumoto (Shuriken Sentai Ninninger), Atsushi Maruyama (Zyuden Sentai Kyoryuger), and Hiroya Matsumoto (Tokumei Sentai Go-Busters) reprise their respective roles. The events of the movie takes place between Spaces 6 and 7.

==== Geth Indaver Strikes Back ====
Uchu Sentai Kyuranger the Movie: Geth Indaver Strikes Back (宇宙戦隊キュウレンジャー THE MOVIE ゲース・インダベーの逆襲, Uchū Sentai Kyūrenjā Za Mūbī Gēsu Indabē no Gyakushū) is a feature film that premiered in the Japanese theaters on August 5, 2017, double billed with Kamen Rider Ex-Aid the Movie: True Ending. The event of the movie takes place between Spaces 22 and 23.

=== V-Cinema ===
==== Episode of Stinger ====
Uchu Sentai Kyuranger: Episode of Stinger (宇宙戦隊キュウレンジャー Episode of スティンガー, Uchū Sentai Kyūrenjā Episōdo Obu Sutingā) is a V-Cinema release that focuses on a side story of Stinger as Sasori Orange. The V-Cinema was released on DVD and Blu-ray on October 25, 2017. The event of the movie takes place between Spaces 34 and 35, when the Kyurangers were liberating Planet 3B from Kouchou Indaver. Six months prior, Stinger and Champ were traveling together on Earth with their search for Scorpio leading them to a town in Jark Matter territory where they meet a half-alien girl named Mika Reetz whose motives of joining Jark Matter were revealed to be due to the prejudice she suffered by the townspeople who she eventually slaughtered to earn her promotion to Daikaan. While Stinger was set to save her from herself, Mika is killed by her superior Zandabarudo when he leaves Earth. Stinger would later encounter Zandabarudo on Planet 3B while Champ's malfunction causes him to run off, learning that Zandabarudo masterminded Mika's suffering so he can become Karo of the Norma System before using the Monoceros Kyutama to obliterate him. Soon after, Stinger leaves the Kyurangers to find Champ.

==== Kyuranger vs. Space Squad ====
Uchu Sentai Kyuranger vs. Space Squad (宇宙戦隊キュウレンジャーVSスペース・スクワッド, Uchū Sentai Kyūrenjā Bāsasu Supēsu Sukuwaddo) is a V-Cinema release that features a crossover between Uchu Sentai Kyuranger and Space Squad. Aside from the main cast of Kyuranger, Yuma Ishigaki and Hiroaki Iwanaga (Space Sheriff Gavan: The Movie), Yuka Hirata (Juken Sentai Gekiranger), Mitsuru Karahashi (Samurai Sentai Shinkenger), Kei Hosogai (Kaizoku Sentai Gokaiger) and Ayame Misaki (Tokumei Sentai Go-Busters) return to reprise their respective roles. The V-Cinema was released on DVD and Blu-ray on August 8, 2018. The event of the movie takes place four years after the final episode of the series.

==== Lupinranger VS Patranger VS Kyuranger ====
Lupinranger VS Patranger VS Kyuranger (ルパンレンジャーVSパトレンジャーVSキュウレンジャー, Rupanrenjā Bui Esu Patorenjā Bui Esu Kyūrenjā) is a V-Cinema release that features a crossover between Kyuranger and Kaitou Sentai Lupinranger VS Keisatsu Sentai Patranger, also including Misao Mondo/Zyuoh The World from Doubutsu Sentai Zyuohger reprising his role. The V-Cinema was released on DVD and Blu-ray on August 21, 2019.

== Cast ==
- Lucky (ラッキー, Rakkī): Takumi Kizu (岐洲 匠, Kizu Takumi)
- Stinger (スティンガー, Sutingā): Yosuke Kishi (岸 洋佑, Kishi Yōsuke)
- Naga Ray (ナーガ・レイ, Nāga Rei), Echidna (エキドナ, Ekidona): Taiki Yamazaki (山崎 大輝, Yamazaki Taiki)
- Hammie (ハミィ, Hamyi): Sakurako Okubo (大久保 桜子, Ōkubo Sakurako)
- Spada (スパーダ, Supāda): Tetsuji Sakakibara (榊原 徹士, Sakakibara Tetsuji)
- Kotaro Sakuma (佐久間 小太郎, Sakuma Kotarō): Shota Taguchi (田口 翔大, Taguchi Shōta)
- Tsurugi Ohtori (鳳 ツルギ, Ōtori Tsurugi): Keisuke Minami (南 圭介, Minami Keisuke)
- Scorpio (スコルピオ, Sukorupio): Yuki Kubota (久保田 悠来, Kubota Yūki)

=== Voice cast ===
- Garu (ガル): Kazuya Nakai (中井 和哉, Nakai Kazuya)
- Balance (バランス, Baransu): Yūki Ono (小野 友樹, Ono Yūki)
- Champ (チャンプ, Chanpu): Akio Ōtsuka (大塚 明夫, Ōtsuka Akio)
- Raptor 283 (ラプター283, Raputā Ni Hachi San): M·A·O
- Shou Ronpo (ショウ・ロンポー, Shō Ronpō): Hiroshi Kamiya (神谷 浩史, Kamiya Hiroshi)
- Don Armage (ドン・アルマゲ, Don Arumage): Atsuki Tani (谷 昌樹, Tani Atsuki)
- Eriedrone (エリードロン, Erīdoron): Takaya Kuroda (黒田 崇矢, Kuroda Takaya)
- Ikargen (イカーゲン, Ikāgen): Yoku Shioya (塩屋 翼, Shioya Yoku)
- Mardakko (マーダッコ, Mādakko): Eri Kitamura (喜多村 英梨, Kitamura Eri)
- Tetchu (テッチュウ, Tetchū): Hiroshi Tsuchida (土田 大, Tsuchida Hiroshi)
- Akyanba (アキャンバー, Akyanbā): Arisa Komiya (小宮 有紗, Komiya Arisa)
- Kukulga (ククルーガ, Kukurūga): Naoya Uchida (内田 直哉, Uchida Naoya)
- Narrator, Kyuranger Equipment: Subaru Kimura (木村 昴, Kimura Subaru)

=== Guest cast ===
- Hoshi Minato (ホシ★ミナト; 1–2, 14, 35–36, 44, 47–48, ending clip): Hiroya Matsumoto (松本 寛也, Matsumoto Hiroya)
- Doctor Anton (アントン博士, Anton-hakase; 3, 38–39, 42, 44–45): Tsuyoshi Ujiki (うじき つよし, Ujiki Tsuyoshi)
- Emu Hojo (宝生 永夢, Hōjō Emu; 7): Hiroki Iijima (飯島 寛騎, Iijima Hiroki)
- Geki Jumonji (十文字 撃, Jūmonji Geki; 18): Yuma Ishigaki (石垣 佑磨, Ishigaki Yūma)
- Banban Akaza (赤座 伴番, Akaza Banban; 18): Ryuji Sainei (さいねい 龍二, Sainei Ryūji)
- Senichi Enari (江成 仙一, Enari Sen'ichi; 18): Yousuke Itou (伊藤 陽佑, Itō Yōsuke)
- Koume Kodou (胡堂 小梅, Kodō Koume; 18): Mika Kikuchi (菊地 美香, Kikuchi Mika)
- Doggie Kruger (ドギー・クルーガー, Dogī Kurūgā; Voice; 18): Tetsu Inada (稲田 徹, Inada Tetsu)
- Orion (オライオン, Oraion; 28-30, 33): Kai Shishido (宍戸 開, Shishido Kai)
- Aslan (アスラン, Asuran; 36–37, 41-43): Ginnojo Yamazaki (山崎 銀之丞, Yamazaki Gin'nojō)
- News Reporter (48): Maya Kobayashi (小林 麻耶, Kobayashi Maya)

== Songs ==
Opening theme

- "Lucky Star" (LUCKYSTAR)
  - Lyrics: Shoko Fujibayashi (藤林 聖子, Fujibayashi Shōko)
  - Composition: KoTa
  - Arrangement: Project.R (KoTa, Tetsuya Takahashi (高橋 哲也, Takahashi Tetsuya))
  - Artist: Tomohiro Hatano (幡野 智宏, Hatano Tomohiro) (Project.R)
  - Episodes: 1-42, 44-47

Ending themes

- "Kyutama Dancing!" (キュータマダンシング!, Kyūtama Danshingu!)
  - Lyrics: Shou Ronpo, Nozomi Inoue (井上 望, Inoue Nozomi)
  - Composition: Atsushi Hirasawa (平沢 敦士, Hirasawa Atsushi)
  - Arrangement: Satoshi Kawase (川瀬 智, Kawase Satoshi) (Project.R)
  - Artist: Tsuyoshi Matsubara (松原 剛志, Matsubara Tsuyoshi) (Project.R)
  - Episodes: 1-21, 28-48
- "Kyutama Ondo!" (キュータマ音頭!, Kyūtama Ondo!)
  - Lyrics: Shou Ronpo, Nozomi Inoue
  - Composition: Atsushi Hirasawa
  - Arrangement: Satoshi Kawase (Project.R)
  - Artist: Tsuyoshi Matsubara (Project.R)
  - Episodes: 22-27
