= Spartakos Glyfadas =

- [[File: |frameless|class=pageimage|alt=]] Logo

Information
- League: Greek Baseball league
- Location: Glyfada, Athens Greece
- Ballpark: Hellinikon Baseball park
- Founded: 1979
- League championships: 2004, 2005, 2006, 2007, 2009, 2012
- Colors: Blue and White
- Manager: Tom Mazarakis

Current uniforms
Home	Away

Spartakos Glyfadas is a baseball team based in Glyfada, Greece. Spartakos is the most successful Greek baseball team having won 6 Greek Baseball league championships and 3 Greek Baseball Cups. The team plays in the Greek Baseball league where they are the current champions.

== Early championship history ==
2000 Greek Baseball Cup winners

Spartakos participated in the first Greek Baseball league championship in 2000 and they finished in second place behind Marousi 2004. The same year they won the inaugural Greek Baseball Cup after beating A.O. Pelopas Patron in the final 23-13. The next year, Spartakos, which had a frustrating year, struggled in the Greek league managing to finish in the fourth place in a year that saw them failing also to defend the Greek cup after being eliminated to the semifinals. In 2002 they were improved in the Greek league but they still could not beat Marousi 2004 for the title finishing in second place, although they manage to beat their archrivals in the Greek Baseball Cup final 13-3 winning their second cup.

== Championship success ==
2009 champions

After a 2003-year that saw Spartakos finish again in second place behind Marousi, Manager Tom Mazarakis shook things up by landing in some new players from the other Greek teams and with the experience that the team had earned from the first 4 seasons they managed to win their first double (and becoming the only Greek baseball club to win a double) after winning the Greek Championship series 3-1 against Ainos Kefallinias (with the last game of the series being a 9-8 thriller win) and after reclaiming the Greek cup demolishing Aris Thessaloniki in the final 23–3. The 2005 and 2006 seasons saw Spartakos successfully defending the Greek Championship by beating Aris Baseball and Mylon Neas Smyrnis in the finals, respectively. The 2007 Greek Baseball league was played with a different format that had 2 different stages, a regular season and the final four group stage. The latter was a group that consisted the top four teams in the league based on their regular season standings, with single games played between the teams. Spartakos easily made it through the final four after finishing first in regular season. In the opening day of the final four group stage Spartakos easily defeated Eyriali Glyfadas 19–0. The second game was against Ainos Kefallinias and Spartakos manage to win after a very close contest by 7–5. The last game was against Aris Baseball which Spartakos won 4–0 winning the championship for a fourth time. The 2008 Greek Baseball league never started because of some financial problems of the Hellenic Amateur Baseball Federation. Nevertheless, Spartakos participated in the 2008 European Cups qualifier that season. The next year's Greek Championship was contested in a regular season only format which meant that the champion would be the first team on the league table after the end of the regular season. Panthers Patras, a newly created team, and Spartakos were tied for first place after the conclusion of the season but Spartakos won the championship after having won the games between the two teams in the season.

== Back to back championship losses ==
What Panthers Patras failed to do at the 2009 season they did at 2010 when they upset the (5 times in a row) defending champions Spartakos to win the 2010 Greek title. The two contenders met at Patras on 5/2/2011 with 4 games remaining and with the two teams being tied at the top of the table. Panthers won the game 3–2 although they were trailing 0–2 till late in the game. After that loss Spartakos easily won the next game against Marousi 2004 15–4, whereas Panthers won their two next games extending their table lead by two wins making the next game for Spartakos a must win situation. The game was against third placed Eyriali who also had mathematical chances to win the title. It was a close encounter and after twelve innings Spartakos managed to score the last run and win the match 9–8. The last game of the season was against league table leaders Panthers and Spartakos needed to win by two runs or a greater margin to finish first and win the title. Spartakos took the lead early on in the game 5–2 and looked the favorite to win the game and the title. That was until the top of the seventh inning which saw Panthers score 6 runs and taking the lead 5–8 which remained till the end of the game giving Panthers their first title. Next season which had the old format of semifinals and finals (all contested in series ) return, found Spartakos struggling to fourth place with two games remaining after losses to Aris Baseball, Marousi 2004 and Eyriali which hurt the chances of Spartakos for first place in the regular season. At the final day against third placed Eyriali, Spartakos managed to win 17–12 and took the third place at the conclusion of the regular season. Spartakos then proceeded to the finals against Marousi 2004 after beating Aris 3-0 in the semi-finals. The finals began with Marousi 2004 winning the first game of the series, then Spartakos won games two and three. Although Spartakos looked ready to win the series and reclaim the title they lost both of the remaining games and finished as runners-up to the 2011 championship.

== Return to success 2012 - Present ==
The 2012 Spartakos team that won the Greek championship

During the 2012 pre-season Manager Tom Mazarakis brought into Spartakos some of the best players of the Greek league making Spartakos the favorite to win the championship. The first game of the season wasn't that easy for Spartakos though as underdogs Mylon Neas Smyrnis took an early lead of 1–6 until the fifth inning which saw Spartakos bounce back and 17–6 with a mercy rule. The second game of the season ended in a similar fashion as Spartakos defeated Olympiada Peristeriou 18–3. The next game for Spartakos was against their arch-rivals Marousi 2004. The game was a close encounter with Spartakos winning 12–8 after tenth inning. Spartakos suffered their only loss of the regular season 17–5 against Marousi and finished first at the conclusion of the regular season with 11–1 record. Spartakos then won the semi-finals' series 3–0 against Eyriali to move to the finals. There they played against the defending champions Marousi 2004. The first game of the series finished with the mercy rule being applied as Marousi 2004 dominated the game winning 16–4. At the second game of the series although Spartakos took an early 2–0 lead after the completion of the first inning, Marousi made some good offence and was ahead 9–4 after the seventh inning. At the top of the eighth inning Spartakos managed to score six runs to regain the lead and after the ninth inning the teams were tied at 10–10. At the top of the tenth inning Spartakos scored one more run but Marousi scored two at the bottom of the tenth to win the game 12–11 and take the 2–0 lead to this best of five series. After this heartbreaking loss Spartakos had to win all the remaining games of the series to avoid a third consecutive championship failure. However the momentum that Marousi had continued early in the third game as they took an early lead 3–0. With the danger of losing the title for another year Spartakos played one of their best games of the season winning by mercy rule 15–5 at 6,5 innings. At the fourth game Spartakos was even more impressive beating Marousi 2004 11–0 again by mercy rule at seven innings. The last game of the series saw Spartakos taking a very confident 8–0 lead at the bottom of the fourth inning. While tension started running high on the Marousi 2004 team they tried to make a late comeback in the top of the ninth inning in which they scored three runs. But in the end Spartakos held their lead and won 10–8, making this the biggest comeback in Greek baseball series history. Actually Spartakos is one of the only two teams in all of Greek sports which have a finals play-off format (the other being AEK Athens BC ) which managed to win the Greek Championship finals after being down 2–0 in a best-of-five series. The 2013 season started with Spartakos participating to the Greek Cup tournament and after three easy wins against Dias Patron, Aris Baseball and Olympiada Peristeriou was eliminated to the semi-finals of the double elimination bracket after two consecutive close losses to Leaders Vouliagmenis thus failing to defend the Greek Cup trophy successfully. The season opener found Spartakos facing Evriali Glyfadas and won fairly easily 13–2. On May 19 Spartakos demolished Aris Baseball with 32–0 after a 5-inning mercy rule was applied. This 32 run difference is a new Greek league record.
