= Agios Nikolaos, Glyfada =

Agios Nikolaos is a subdivision of the municipality of Glyfada in south Athens in Attica, Greece. Together with the neighboring Glyfada's Kolimvitirio neighborhood and Golf neighborhood it is also one of the most expensive districts of Glyfada and Athens in general. This is due to its close distance to Glyfada's boutiques and shopping centres, as well as the Athens Tram and the sea. The Agios Nikolaos district was also the home-town to Glyfada's ex mayor, Theodoros Spondilides.

The area took its name from a church that was built there in 1877 named after the Christian saint Agios Nikolaos It was built by Theodoro Komnino, and is nowadays referred as small Agios Nikolaos after a new one was built in 1962.

== Local culture ==
The area has one of the oldest private education schools, Yannopoulos Schools. It was built in 1954 in Glyfada, while having connected organization with the mother school at Nikaia. By now, it offers infrastructure for all stages of Greek education before entering a university.
