= Rugby union in Greece =

- Country: Greece
- National team: Greece
- First played: Early 20th Century

National competitions
- Rugby World Cup; Rugby World Cup Sevens; IRB Sevens World Series; European Nations Cup

Rugby union in Greece is a minor but growing sport.

== Governing body ==
The governing body is the Greek Rugby Federation or Hellas Rugby Federation (ΕΟΡ).

The Hellenic Rugby Federation was set up in 2001, by those involved in rugby at the time and in 2004 at the instigation of the then Deputy Minister of Sport, George Orfanos, with the subsequent appointment of Dr Evangelos Stamos as President overthrowing the then first board (2001 - 2004). Τhe Greek government removed its administrative authority in 2014. From September 2014 to May 2023 the governing body was Hellenic Handball Federation, after the Greek Government withdrew sports representation authority from the Hellenic Rugby Federation (Ελληνικής Ομοσπονδίας Ράγκμπι), which was affiliated to World Rugby. Greece was suspended from World Rugby at the end of 2014 but was reinstated in May 2015 and has since been suspended again. An explanation has not been given for the suspension.

In May 2023, the Greek General Secretariat of Sports restored recognition of the Greek Rugby Federation.

== History ==
Rugby first appears to have been played by British sailors in Greece, probably in the early 20th century. However, it has not been well organised until recently. The Greek Diaspora emigrated to many rugby playing countries, notably England, South Africa and Australia, and some of these people have returned or informed their family about the game. A second factor is that a number of British expatriates have come to live in Greece and some have set up clubs. However, these invariably are not very inclusive of native Greeks.

Rugby started developing in Greece during the 1990s, and the setting up of the HRU in October 2001, led to the national team participating in the European Nations Cup in 2005, and the establishment of annual league competitions from 2005 to the present. This is partly due to pressure from rugby league in Greece which has started aggressive recruitment in recent years, and has set up a national team composed mostly of Greek Australians, managed by Colin Mylonas, himself an Australian. Although rugby union has a much longer history in Greece, the Greek Rugby League was set up in 2003.

== Domestic Championship ==
The domestic championship began in 2005–06 and has been dominated by Athens RFC who won the first four championships.

In 2005–06 Athens claimed the title in unsatisfactory manner when Rhodes Colossi were unable to get to the final in Athens because bad weather prevented their ferry from leaving Rhodes. Athens were thus given a walkover although in fairness they had dominated the season and were clear favourites to win.

In 2006–07, Athens and Rhodes again made it to the final which Athens won 19 – 0 at the Zirinio Stadium in Athens. The following year the championship was played as a straight league with no Grand Final - Athens comfortably won it with Attica Springboks finishing as runners-up.

The 2008–09 season again saw Athens emerging triumphant although only after an exciting final against Attica Springboks at the stadium in Glyka Nera which Athens won 22 – 18.

Seven teams took part in the 2009–10 championship. These were Athens RFC, Athens Spartans, Attica Springboks, Iraklis Thessaloniki, Macedones Evosmos, Rhodes Colossi, Thessaloniki Lions. After a 44-match winning streak Athens were finally beaten by Rhodes on October 18, 2009.

== See also ==
- Greece national rugby union team
- Greek Championship Rugby Union
