= Panthers Patras =

Baseball club in Greece

Information
- League: Greek Baseball league
- Location: Patras Greece
- Ballpark: [N/A]
- Founded: 2008
- League championships: 2010
- Colors: Navy Blue and White
- Manager: Nikos Sklavounos
- Website: www.patrapanthers.com

Current uniforms
Home	Away

Panthers Patras is a sports club based in Patras, Greece. It develops the following sports: 1. Men Baseball 2. Women Fastpitch softball

Panthers is the only non Athenian team that ever won a baseball championship in Greece and this is a wonder since there is no baseball field in entire Peloponnese area. The team plays in the Greek Baseball league which has only two, non Athenian teams – Panthers Patras and Aris Salonica.

== Early history ==
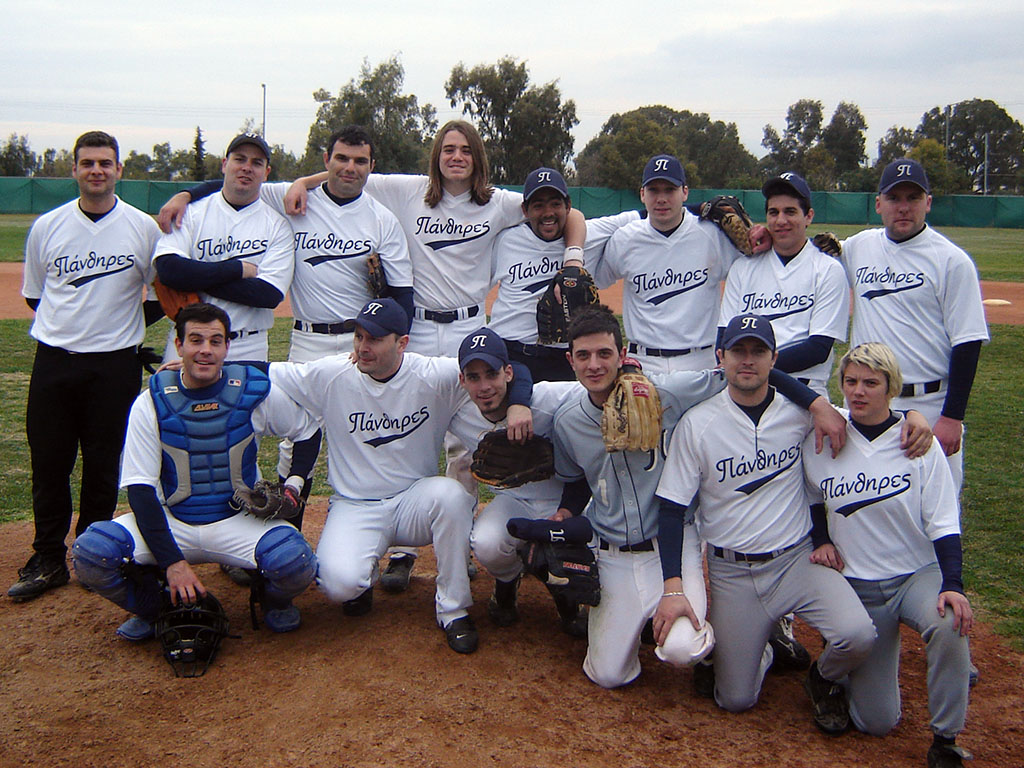
Team in 2009

With the establishment of the club (in 2008 ) the first goal was to create created the male baseball team. This feat was implemented mainly by obtaining athletes from broken baseball teams in Patras ( Sirius, Pelops, Theseus and Galini) due to the economic boycott that 32 federations suffered in Greece because of the economic crisis. The team played first time in 2009 at the Greek Baseball League and won the Silver medal. They tied with the first team Spartakos Glyfadas, but due to the defeat in their match between, Panthers ranked second.

== Baseball Champions 2010 (season 2010-2011) ==
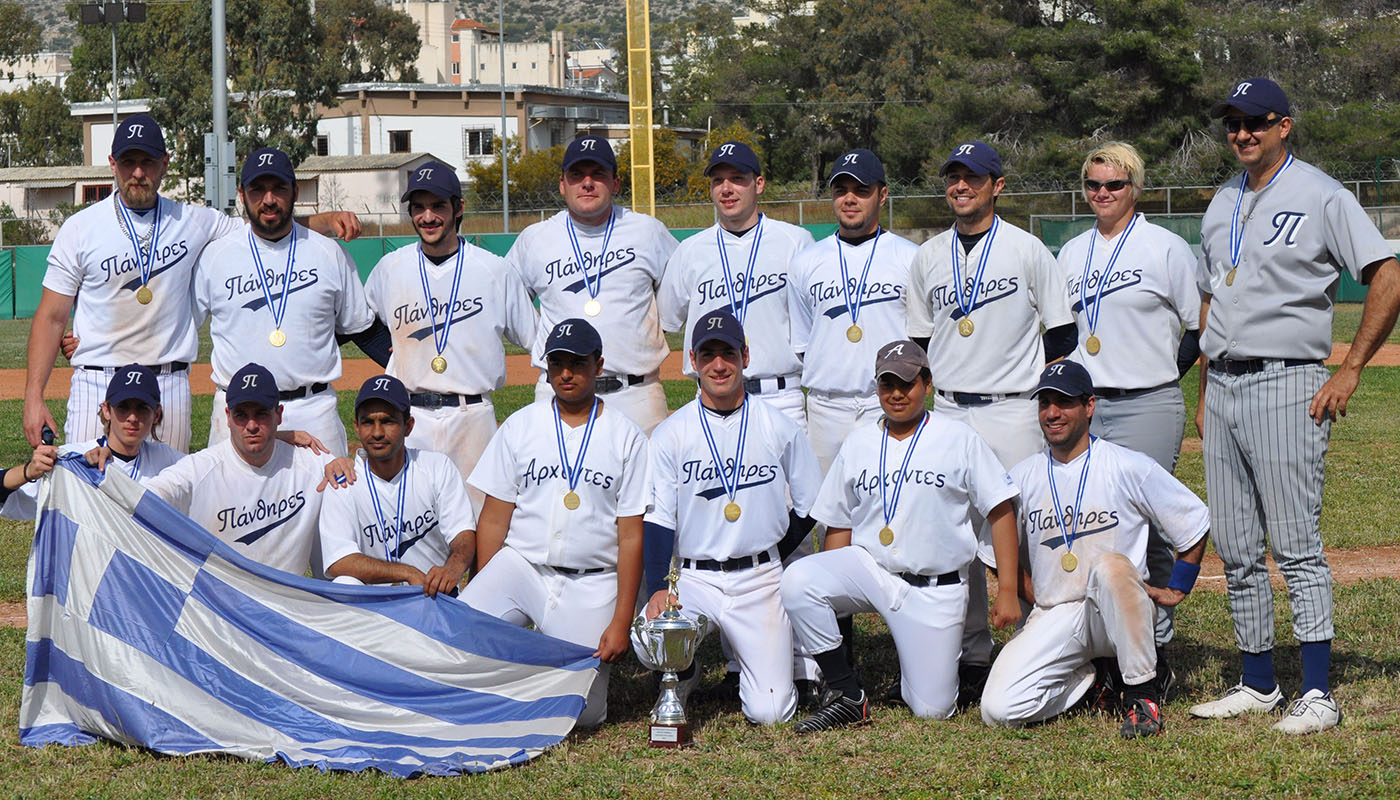
Team in 2011

In 2010 the team participated in the 10th Greek Baseball League and won the first place and the gold medal. It is the first time for any men team from Patras, that won any champion that of any team sport since 1950. After obtaining their prize, all old Patras players that where expecting a championship since the beginning of baseball in Greece, abandoned the team, leaving it with only rookies. The team played next championship, and ranked 5th and next year did not participate. Again played in 2013 but 3 injuries made the 2013 attempt to stop early. The baseball team collects new players and struggles with no baseball field to teach the basics and participate again in the next up coming event of the Greek Baseball federation.

== Fast Pitch Softball ==
...

Panthers Fast Pitch Softball Uniform

== Sources ==
- Panthers Patras
- Greek Little League
