= Athens RFC =

Greek rugby club

- Full name: Athens Rugby Football Club
- Founded: 2004
- Location: Athens, Greece
- Ground(s): Glyka Nera
- League(s): Greek Championship Rugby Union
Team kit

Athens RFC (Greek: Α.Σ.Ρ.Φ. Αθηνών) is a Greek rugby club in Athens. It is based in Glyka Nera. The club founded in 2004 and it is the most times winner of Greek Championship Rugby Union.

== Titles ==
- Greek Championship Rugby Union (6): 2006, 2007, 2008, 2009, 2010, 2011
