= Aeolos Rugby =

(Greece) Aeolos Rugby
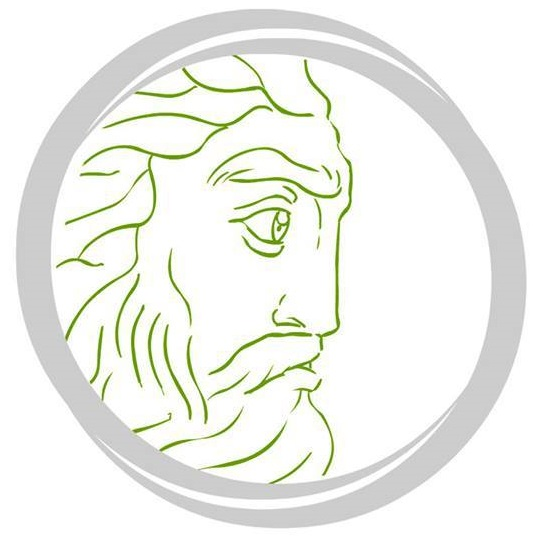
- Full name: Aeolos Patras Rugby Club
- Founded: 2010
- Location: Patras, Greece
- Ground(s): Agios Stafanos Municipality Field, Agios Stefanos
- Chairman: (Greece) Markos Andreas
- League(s): Unity Cup, Unity 7s Cup
Team kit

Official website
- www.aeolosrugby.gr

Aeolos Rugby (Greece)

Aeolos Rugby is the first rugby union team established in Patras, Greece and Peloponnisos in general. It is part of Aeolos Gymnastic Club.
The team has played its "home" matches in Haikali municipality stadium.

== History ==
=== First Era (2010-11) ===
The team was founded in August 2010, by local people assisted by French who used to live in Patras.
Aeolos under Christophe Zapirain's directions, competed in 2010-11 for the 15s Greek National Championship and finished in 5th place.
Unfortunately in the summer of 2011 the team decided to pause all activities.

=== 2013–present ===
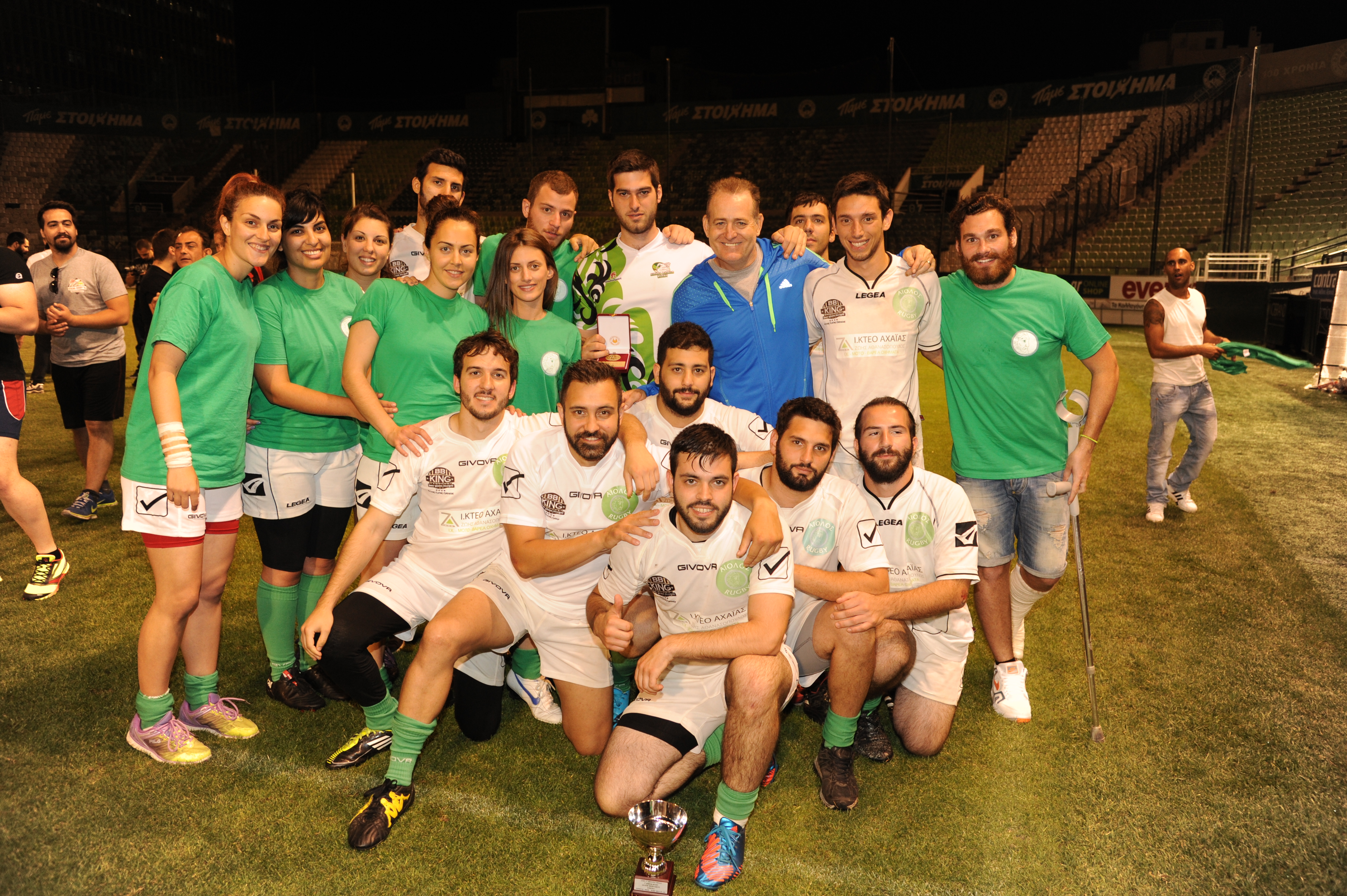
Aeolos 7s team with David Campese

In April 2013 few locals formed a Rugby team in Patras that was named Patras Rebels. After some months the team was merged with Aeolos Rugby.
Aeolos rugby in 2013-14 participated in Unity Cup and Unity 7's Cup of GRASS facing Athens Spartans RFC, Panathinaikos RFC, Attica Springboks RFC, Thessaloniki Lions RFC, Titanes Kavalas RFC, West Side United RFC. Despite being a newcomer Aeolos team managed to finish 3rd in the Unity Cup after a long challenging season. Alongside the 7s team of Aeolos secured the 3rd place in Unity 7s Cup, in which the players had the honor to meet and play with the Australian rugby legend, David Campese.
Also in 2014 Aeolos 7s Rugby Women team was created that also took part in Unity 7s Cup.

== Badge and colours ==
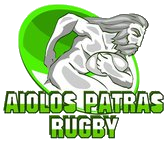
Aeolos Old Crest(2010)

The club's badge is derived from the ruler of the winds in Greek mythology, Aeolus.
The Aeolos Rugby first strip in 2010 was black shirt with green sleeves, black shorts and green socks.
In 2013 when the team was merged with Patras Rebels the strip changed, now the shirt is white with green details, white shorts and green socks.

== Grounds ==
Aeolos is using the municipality field of Agios Stefanos, which is located in between the villages of Agios Stefanos and Haikali.
In the summer of 2013 with the help of the local community of Agios Stefanos and Haikali municipality, the local Football field was renovated and the first exclusively Rugby field in Greece was created.

== Sponsorship ==
The club's first shirt sponsors at the beginning of the 2010–11 season was Freyssinet and Jidet.
In 2014 Aeolos signed a deal with Zaharopoulos Basilios and Arkhon Panel became the golden sponsor of the team. Also Cherry's Cafe and The Mark are sponsoring the club.

== Players ==
As of 1 October 2014

=== Seniors ===
| **Forwards**; (Greece) Arapogiannis Thomas (Greece) Arnaoutis Aggelos (Greece) **Barakos Georgios** (c) (Greece) Sklivas Aggelos (Greece) Kotsetas Panagiotis (Greece) Aggelakopoulos Georgios (Greece) Giannakopoulos Basilios (Greece) Markos Apostolos (Greece) Maxeras Panagiotis (Greece) **Papagiavis Georgios** (Greece) Papachristou Aleksandros (Greece) Sakkoulis Athanasios (Greece) Skretas Sotirios (Greece) Tsigaras Ioannis (Greece) Solakakis Stauros | **Backs**; (Greece) Gatsos Dimitrios (Greece) Simeopoulos Georgios (Greece) Livanos Theodoros (Greece) Livanos Georgios (Greece) Panagopoulos Georgios (Greece) Kallinikos Theodoros (Greece) Panagiotopoulos Ilias (Greece) Panagopoulos Petros (Greece) Rousseas Panagiotis (Greece) Mauroudakis Panagiotis (Greece) Christodoulou Georgios (Greece) Nikolopoulos Christos (Greece) Bardakis Aggelos (Greece) Klosteridis Nikiforos (Greece) Zachiotis Christos |

(c) Denotes team captain, Bold denotes player has been internationally capped.

=== Women ===
| (Greece) Markou Eustathia (Greece) Christofi Eudoksia (c) (Greece) Kaukia Loukia (Greece) Tsampli Maria (Greece) Bracha Nikoleta (Greece) Davilla Eustathia (Greece) Chrisanthopoulou Eutihia (Greece) Siameti Fotini (Greece) Aggelakopoulou Dimitra (Greece) Margariti Chara (Greece) Kipreou Ioanna (Greece) Siriopoulou Vasiliki (Greece) Halimi Florida (Greece) Chrisanthopoulou Triseugeni (Greece) Christopoulou Christina (Greece) Christopoulou Christina |

(c) Denotes team captain.

=== Veterans ===
| (France) Cyril Rouzies (France) Christophe Zapirain (France) Luc Desaintpalais (France) Robinson Nicoloso (France) Mathieu Augereau (France) Frederic Cochin (Greece) Poludoropoulos Panagiotis |

== Citations and References ==
- fr:Championnat de Grèce de rugby à XV#Clubs
- https://web.archive.org/web/20140208171052/http://www.panhellenicrugby.com/
- http://www.dete.gr/
- https://web.archive.org/web/20140325012240/http://achaiasports.gr/
- http://www.pelop.gr/default.aspx?page=home
- http://www.patrasevents.gr/
- http://www.patrasnews.com/
- https://web.archive.org/web/20140324201312/http://www.rugbyingreek.com/
- http://www.thebest.gr/
- http://www.markasport.gr/?section=995&language=el_GR
- https://web.archive.org/web/20140324201910/http://www.hellasrugby.gr/
