= Glyfada =

Suburb of Athens, Greece

Glyfada Γλυφάδα (Greek)
- Municipality
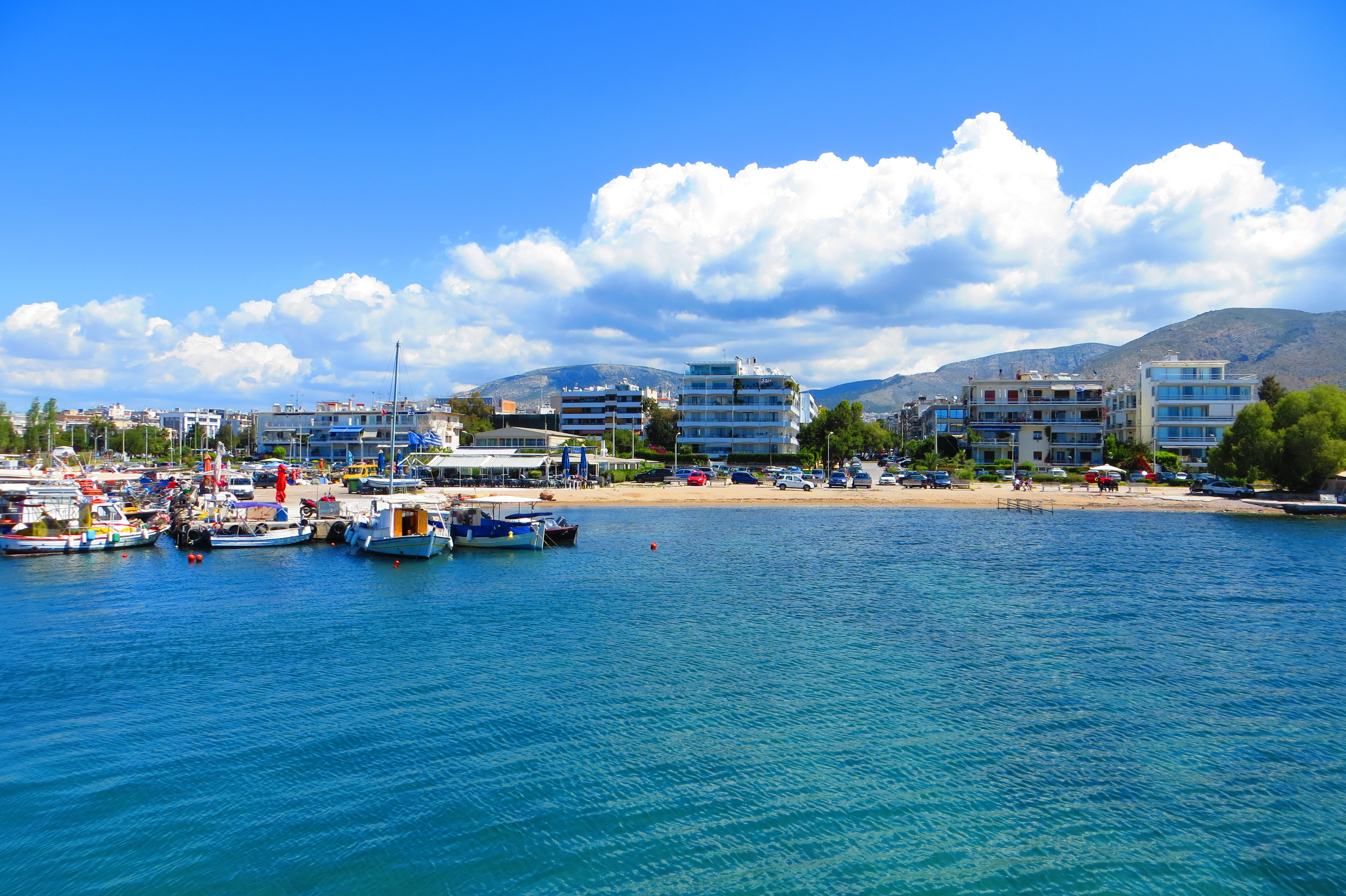
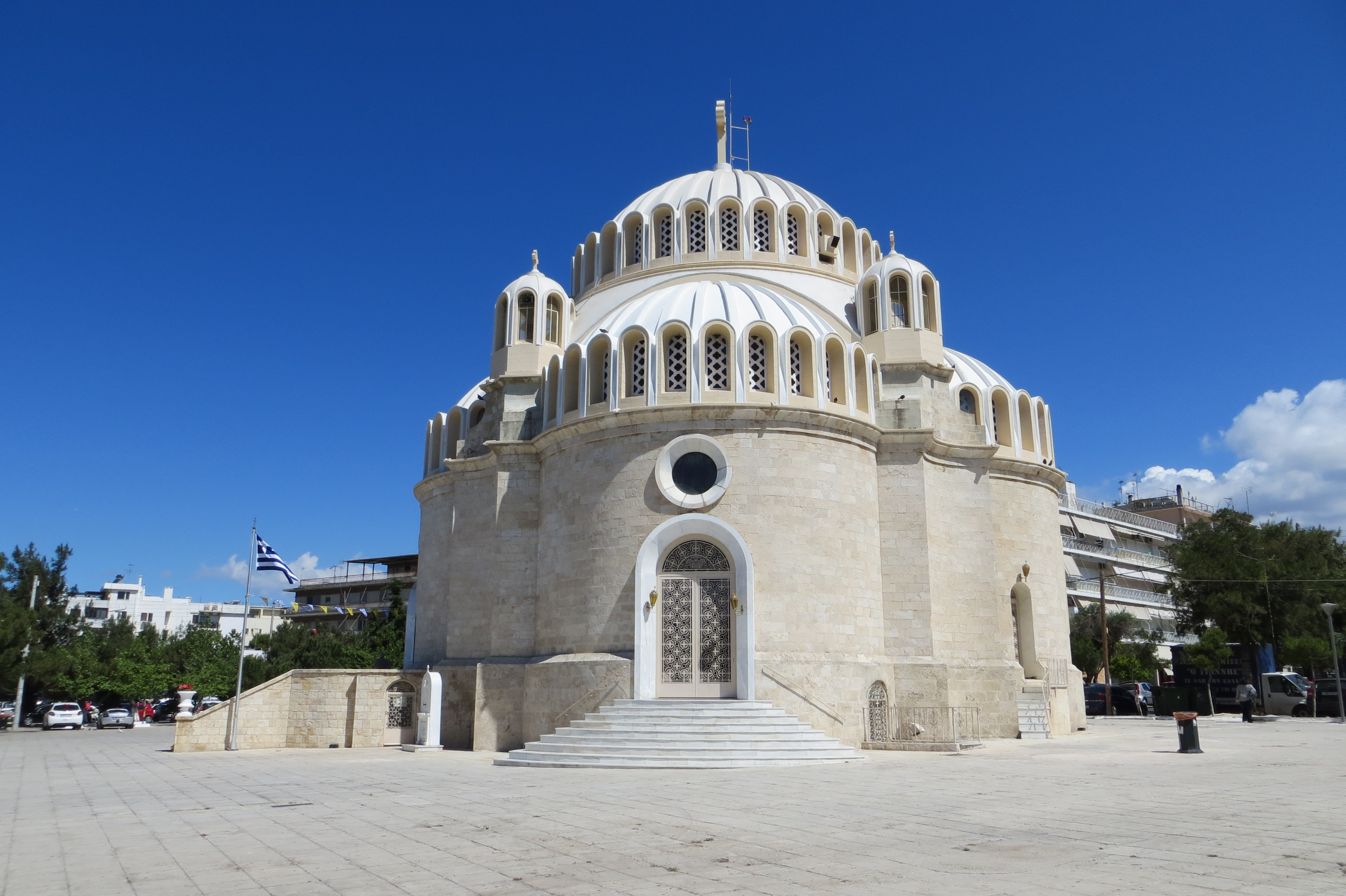
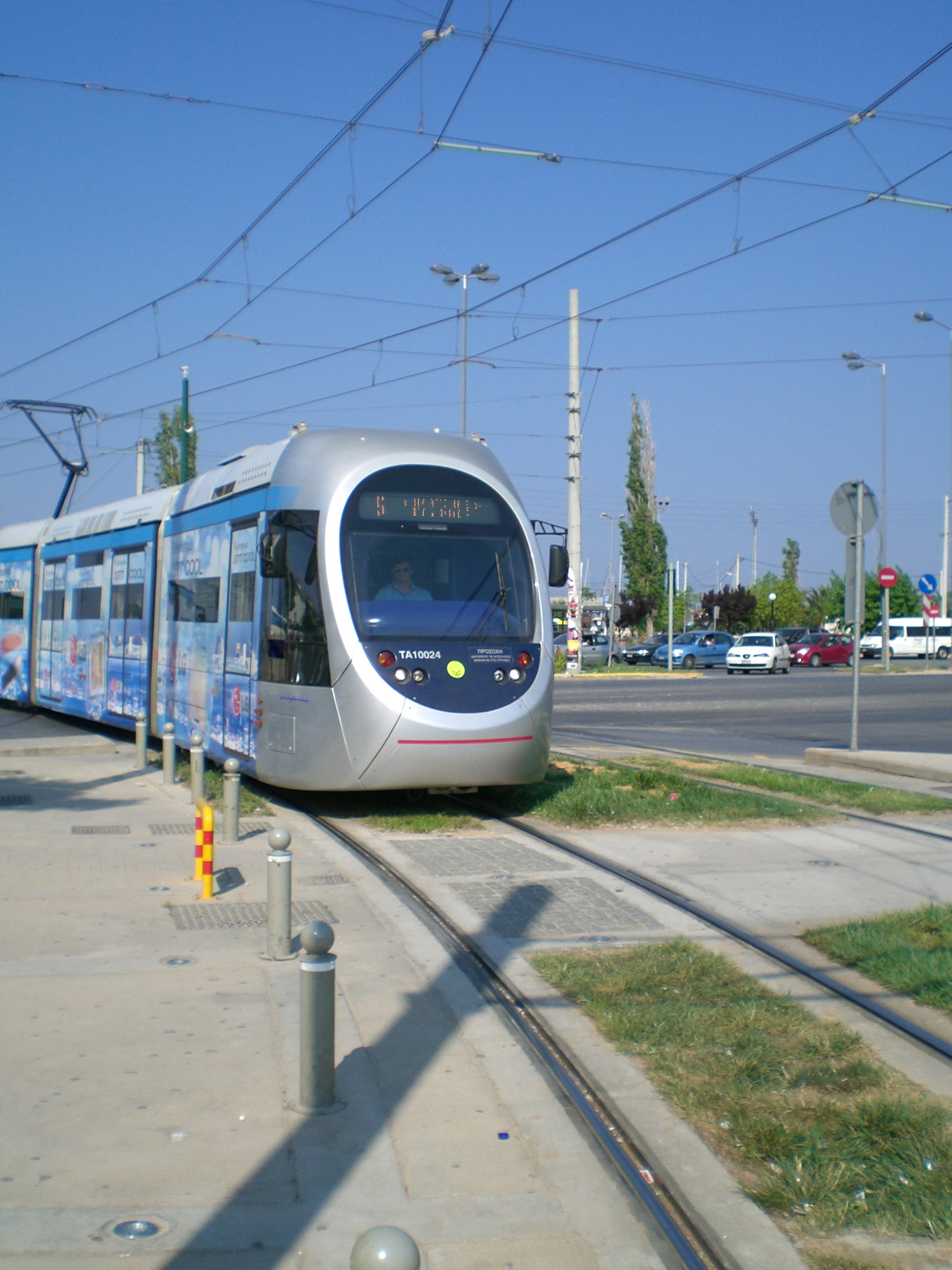
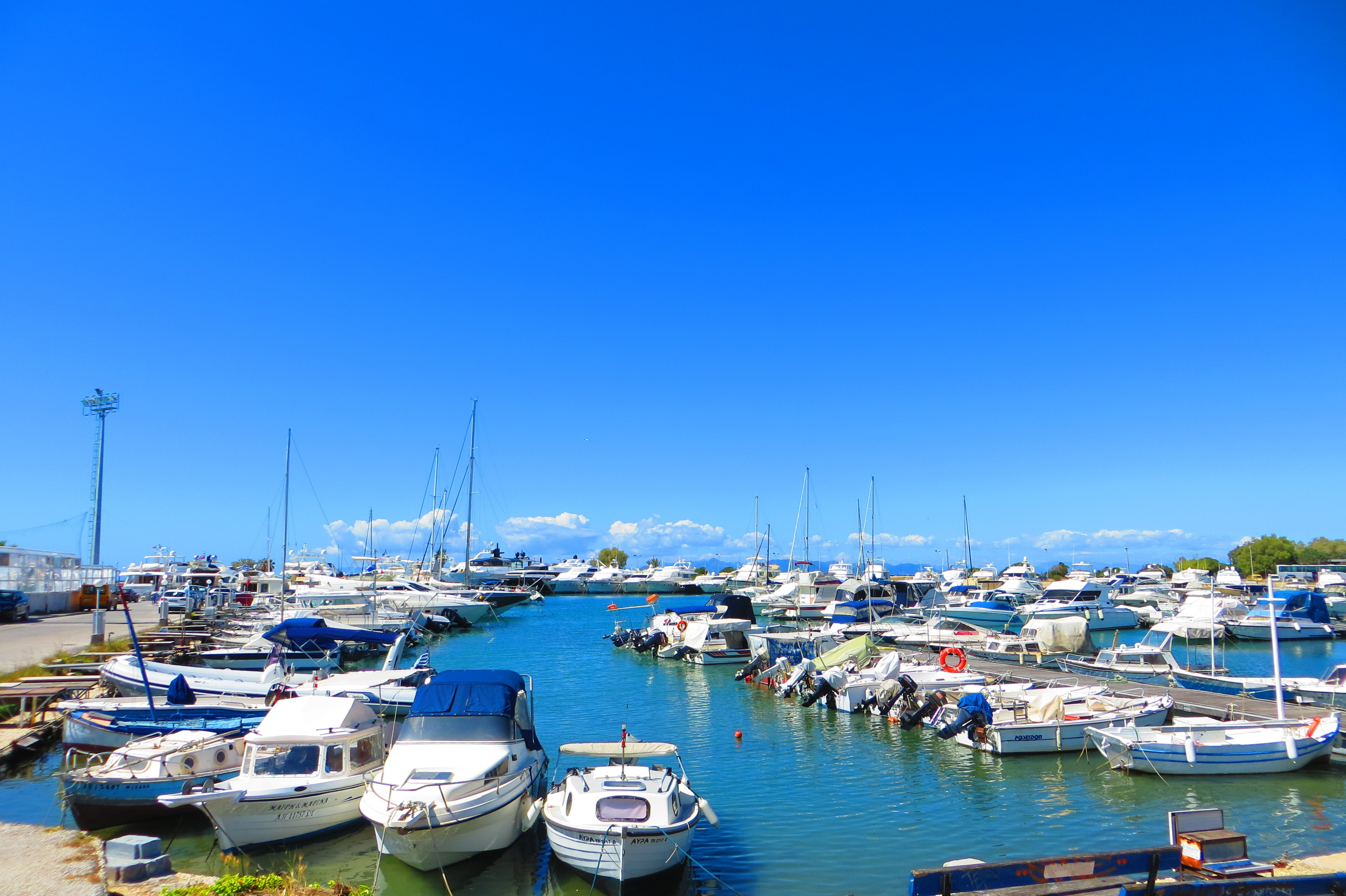
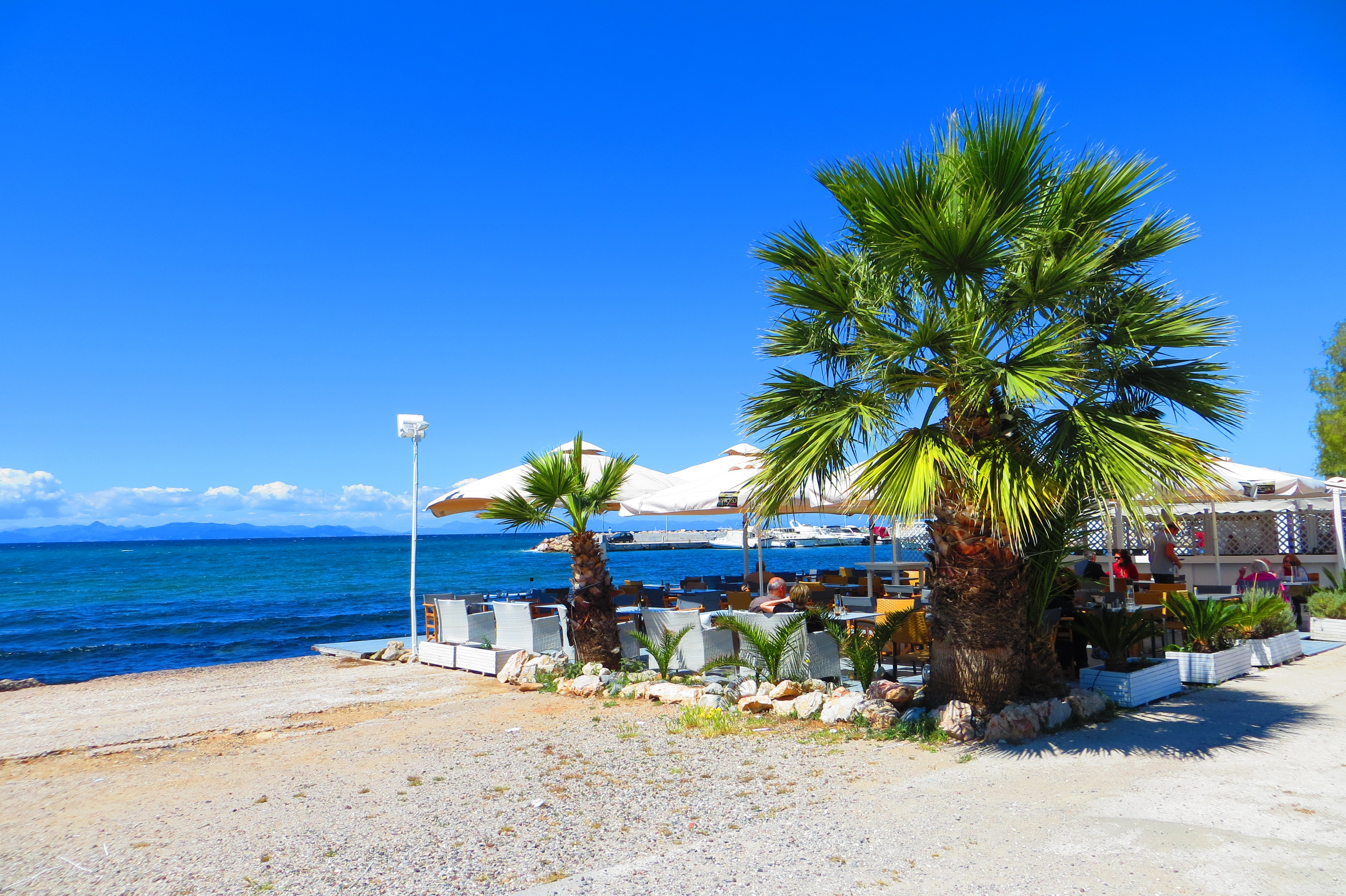
- Coastline of Glyfada St. Constantine & Helen Church Athens Tram 3rd Glyfada Marina Glyfada Beach

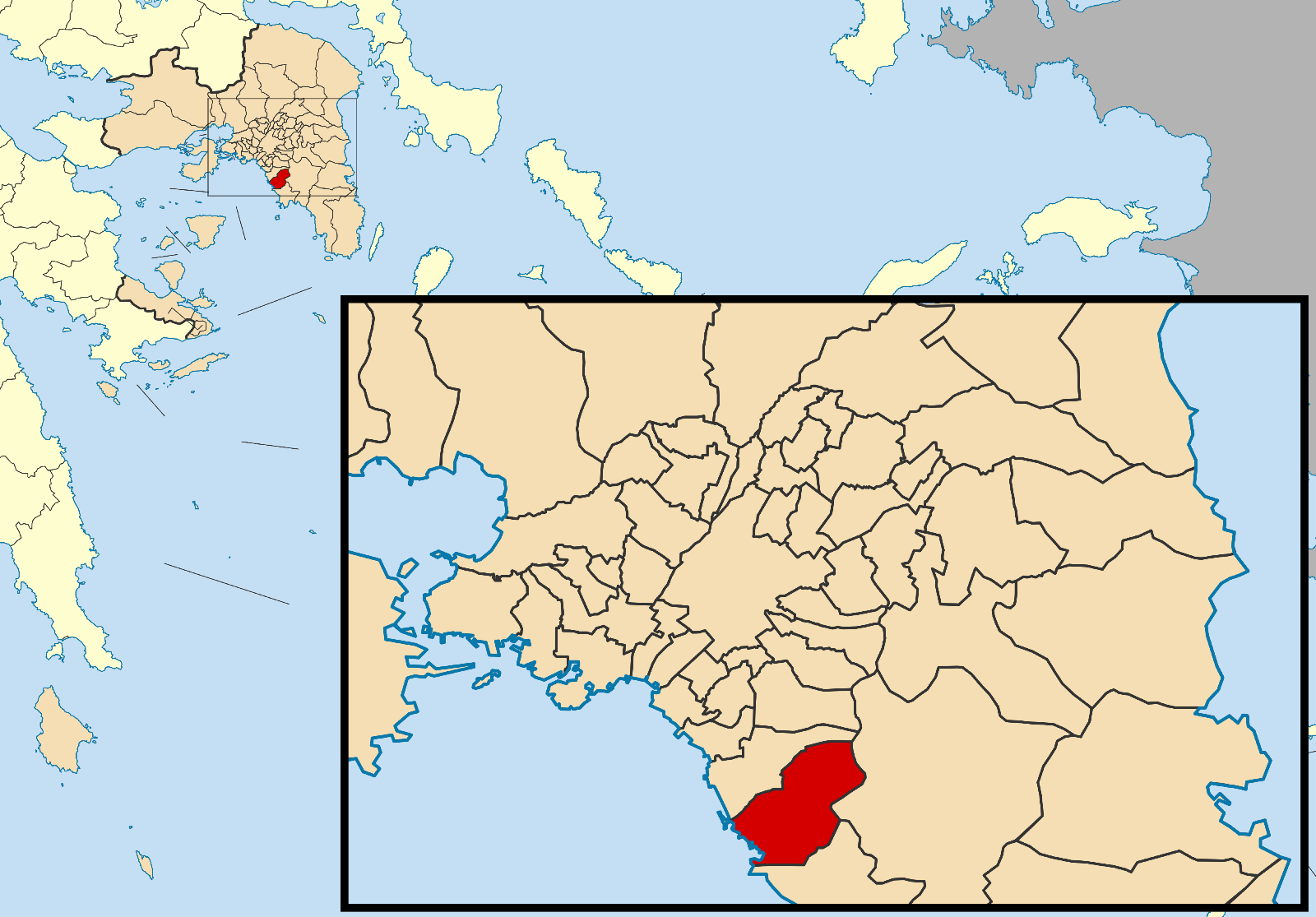

- Location within Greece
- Coordinates: 37°52′N 23°45′E
- Country: Greece
- Administrative region: Attica
- Regional unit: South Athens

Government
  - Mayor: Giorgos Papanikolaou (since 2014)

Area
  - Municipality: 25.366 km^{2} (9.794 sq mi)
- Elevation: 5 m (16 ft)

Population (2021)
  - Municipality: 89,597
  - Density: 3,532.2/km^{2} (9,148.3/sq mi)
- Time zone: UTC+2 (EET)
  - Summer (DST): UTC+3 (EEST)
- Postal code: 166 xx, 165 xx
- Area code: 210
- Vehicle registration: I
- Website: Δήμος Γλυφάδας

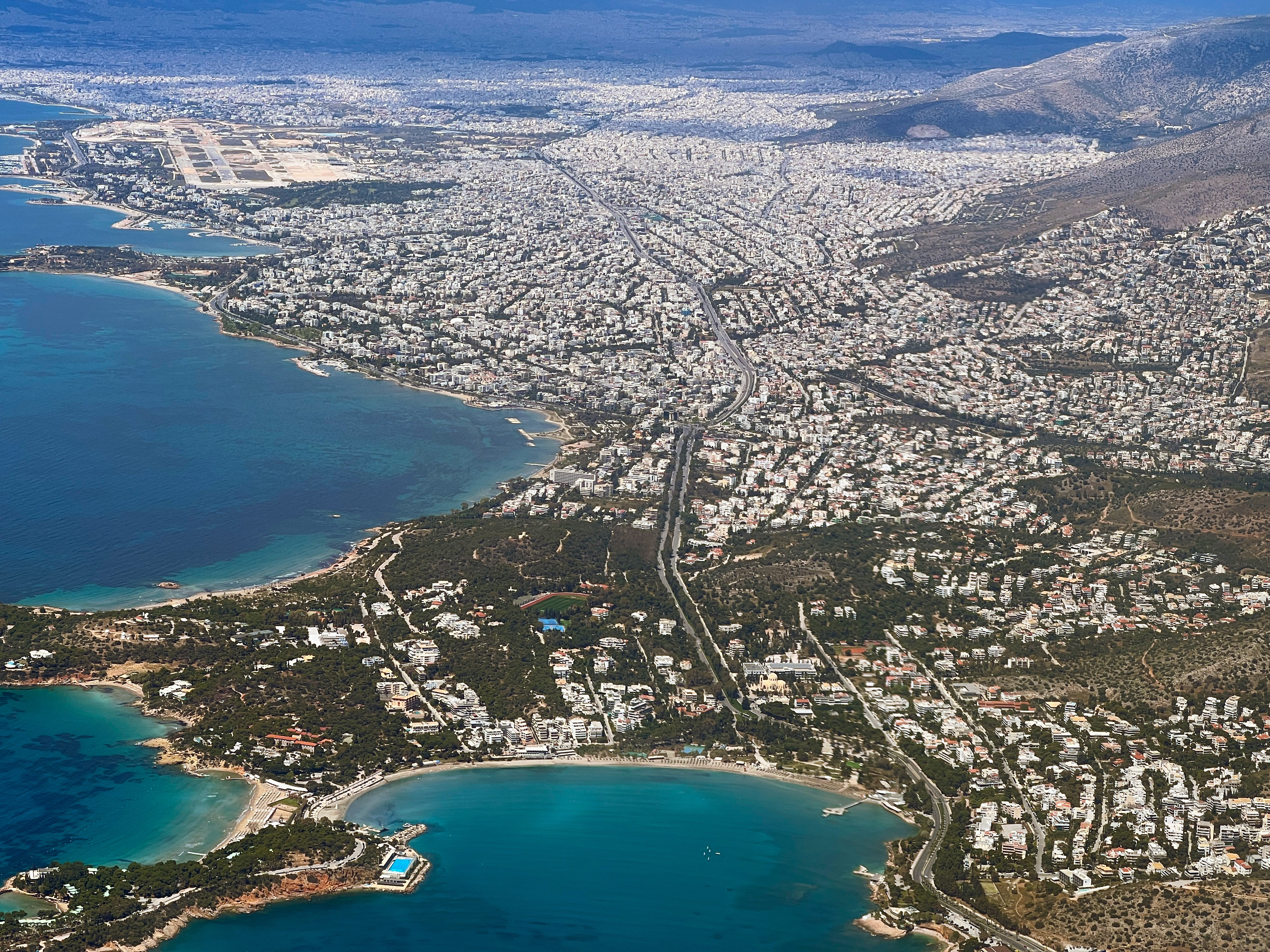
Aerial view of Glyfada and Vouliagmeni

Glyfada (Greek: Γλυφάδα, romanized: Glypháda, pronounced [ɣliˈfaða]) is a town and a suburb in the South Athens regional unit located in the Athens Riviera along the coast of the Saronic Gulf. It is situated in the southern parts of the Athens urban area. The area stretches from the foot of the Hymettus mountain to the Saronic Gulf.

== History ==
In ancient times, the area was a deme known as Aixone (Αἰξωνή). Today, Glyfada is packed with some of the capital's best-known nightclubs, upscale restaurants and shops. It could be argued to be one of the most "Americanized" of Athenian municipalities, since an American airbase was located nearby until the early 1990s. The base's population contributed in part to Glyfada's character, leading to a unique blend of Greek and American atmosphere and cuisine. Although the base is now gone and the school relocated, Glyfada still retains part of its American flavor while continuing to offer distinctly Greek cuisine, entertainment, and nightlife.

Glyfada was established as the heart of Athens' southern suburbs, because of its prime waterfront location, rich commercial center, and modern business district. It has been described as the headpoint of the 'Athens Riviera' and features some of Europe's most opulent seafront residences, gardens and extensive beachfront property, with a modern marina.

The town hall is located at the center of the municipality; nearby, Glyfada's shopping district. The area's shopping district runs across Metaxa Avenue and Grigoriou Labraki Street while both the offices of major businesses and shopping areas also dot the Avenues Vouliagmenis, Gounari, and Gennimata.

At the beginning of the 20th century the town had already changed its name to "Glyfada", a name given because of the presence of salt-water wells, typical of this area.

== Architecture ==
Aixoni in Glyfada was the site for a project of Dimitris Pikionis for an artist colony. Only a small chapel was built, the Chapel of the Akathist Hymn.

A major work of Nella Golanda, the Aixoni Quarry Sculpted Theatre is located in what was an old quarry on the slope of Mount Hymnetus.

== Transportation ==
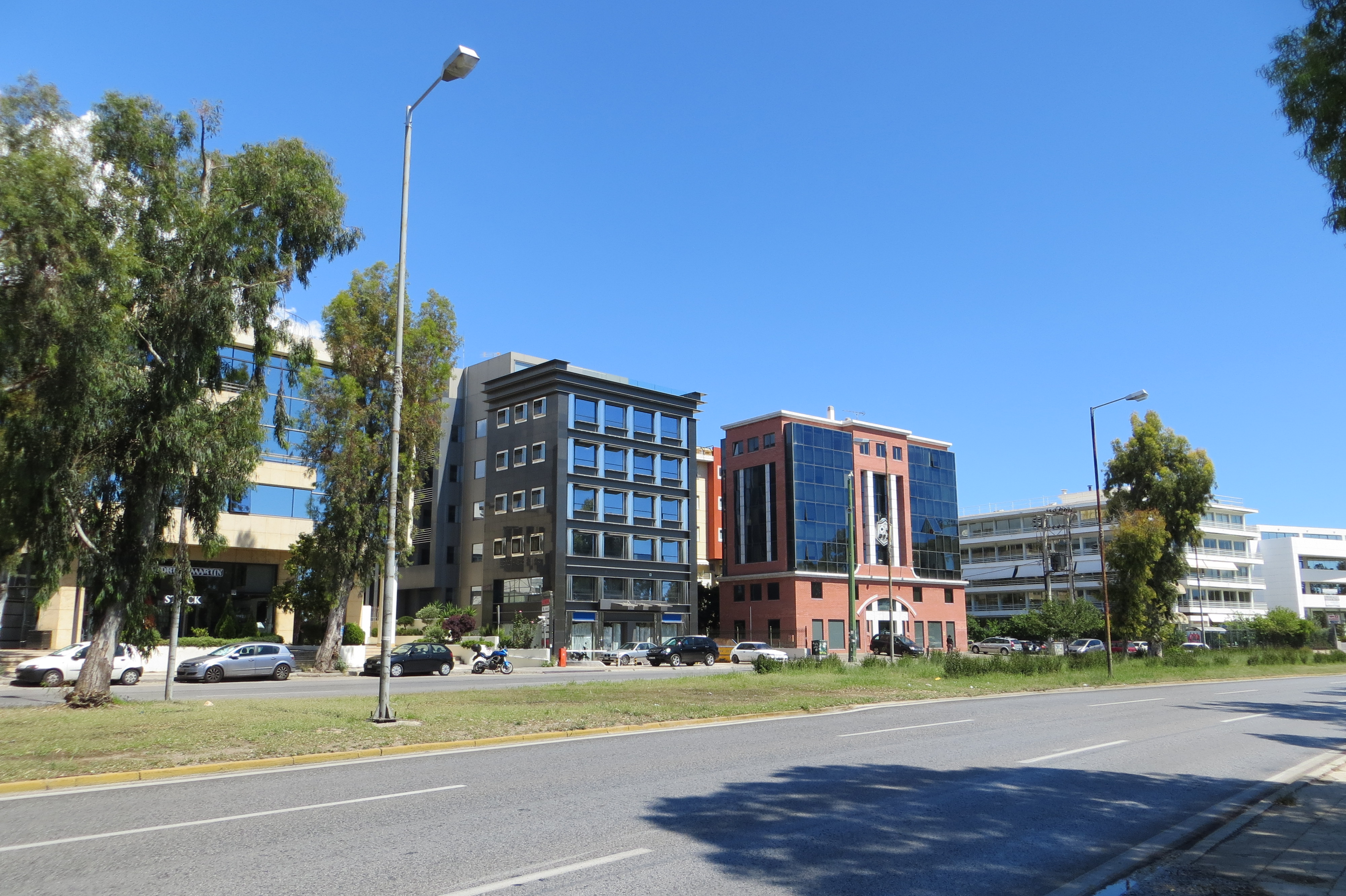
Poseidonos Avenue

Glyfada is connected to central Athens via two major avenues (Poseidonos Avenue and Vouliagmenis Avenue) and a tram line operated by STASY S.A. which goes across the seaside next to Poseidonos Avenue. An extension of the Line 2 of Athens Metro from Elliniko station to the south, with two stations in Ano Glyfada and Glyfada is being planned. A version of these plans includes a third station between Ano Glyfada and Glyfada stations.

== Municipality ==
32,492 people registered with the Municipality of Glyfada voted during the Municipal Elections of October 2006. At the second round, 54.79% of the votes were for Thanasis Papakostas, who was the mayor of Glyfada for the 2006–2010 period. Kostantinos Kokoris was just elected mayor. In 2014, George Papanikolaou was elected mayor in the Glyfada municipality.

== Geography ==
The municipality has an area of 25.366 km^{2} and it is located in the Athens Riviera. Glyfada Marina includes marine space and coastal land area totaling 3 kilometres (2 miles), and a concrete land mass between basins A and B with a length of roughly 250 metres (820 feet), between basins B and G with a length of roughly 150 metres (490 feet), between basins G and D with a length of roughly 300 metres (980 feet), and between basin D until the end of the basin of roughly 350 metres (1,150 feet), with all harbor facilities and buildings found within this space.

Northwest is the golf course of Athens, the Glyfada Golf Club, located south of the former Ellinikon Airport. To the east and northeast there is an urban sprawl which spreads over the southwest shoulder of Mt. Hymettus and its rocky landscape.

=== Climate ===
Glyfada has a hot-summer Mediterranean climate with mild winters and hot summers. The driest months are during the summer while the wettest period is during the autumn and early winter.

Climate data for Glyfada Golf 53 m a.s.l.
Month	Jan	Feb	Mar	Apr	May	Jun	Jul	Aug	Sep	Oct	Nov	Dec	Year
Record high °C (°F)	22.4 (72.3)	21.7 (71.1)	25.9 (78.6)	29.3 (84.7)	35.1 (95.2)	41.3 (106.3)	45.9 (114.6)	45.2 (113.4)	38.2 (100.8)	31.5 (88.7)	27.9 (82.2)	21.9 (71.4)	45.9 (114.6)
Mean daily maximum °C (°F)	15.2 (59.4)	16.2 (61.2)	17.5 (63.5)	21.7 (71.1)	26.1 (79.0)	31.6 (88.9)	35.6 (96.1)	35.1 (95.2)	30.1 (86.2)	25.4 (77.7)	20.9 (69.6)	17.1 (62.8)	24.4 (75.9)
Daily mean °C (°F)	12.5 (54.5)	13.0 (55.4)	14.2 (57.6)	18.0 (64.4)	22.3 (72.1)	27.4 (81.3)	31.4 (88.5)	31.0 (87.8)	26.5 (79.7)	22.2 (72.0)	18.0 (64.4)	14.6 (58.3)	20.9 (69.7)
Mean daily minimum °C (°F)	9.8 (49.6)	9.7 (49.5)	10.9 (51.6)	14.3 (57.7)	18.5 (65.3)	23.2 (73.8)	27.1 (80.8)	26.8 (80.2)	23.0 (73.4)	18.9 (66.0)	15.2 (59.4)	12.1 (53.8)	17.5 (63.4)
Record low °C (°F)	0.7 (33.3)	0.0 (32.0)	2.1 (35.8)	7.9 (46.2)	13.3 (55.9)	16.3 (61.3)	20.6 (69.1)	20.4 (68.7)	16.4 (61.5)	13.6 (56.5)	8.3 (46.9)	3.2 (37.8)	0.0 (32.0)
Average rainfall mm (inches)	31.8 (1.25)	16.3 (0.64)	14.6 (0.57)	6.9 (0.27)	6.1 (0.24)	12.6 (0.50)	4.2 (0.17)	10.5 (0.41)	9.4 (0.37)	16.8 (0.66)	33.6 (1.32)	57.4 (2.26)	220.2 (8.66)
Source: Davis WeatherLink Network (Jun 2019 - Feb 2025)

== Sports ==
The Glyfada Indoor Hall is located at the Municipality, formerly a major indoor sport venue of local Athens teams. Glyfada is the seat of ANO Glyfada, club with many honors in Greek Water Polo and Glyfada F.C.

Sport clubs based in Glyfada
Club	Founded	Sports	Achievements
ANO Glyfada	1946	Water Polo	Panhellenic titles in Water Polo both Men and Women teams
Terpsithea Glyfada B.C.	1958	Basketball, Football	Presence in A1 Ethniki women
Glyfada F.C. (founded as Keravnos Glyfada)	1976	Football	Presence in Gamma Ethniki
Spartakos Glyfadas	1979	Baseball	Panhellenic titles in baseball
G.S.Glyfadas.	1997	Athletics	Panhellenic titles(outdoor, indoor, cross country)
Spartakos Glyfadas	1979	Baseball	Panhellenic titles in baseball

== Famous residents and people ==
- Sophia Aliberti, TV personality and actress
- Bessy Argyraki, Greek singer, Eurovision contestant and ex member of Glyfada's city council
- George Baldock, Greek football player
- Christos Dantis, Greek Rock artist
- Anna Diamantopoulou, former Greek EU representative and former minister of Education
- Predrag Đorđević, Serbian footballer
- Evridiki, Greek Singer
- Eleni Foureira, Greek Singer
- Takis Fyssas, Greek footballer
- Mihalis Hatzigiannis, Greek Cypriot artist
- Kalomira, Pop singer and Eurovision contestant
- Giorgos Karagounis, Greek footballer
- Zeta Makripoulia, Greek actress
- Giorgos Mazonakis, Greek singer
- Constantine Mitsotakis, former Prime Minister of Greece
- Tony Mokbel, convicted Australian criminal
- Mikael Nilsson, retired football player from Sweden
- Fani Palli-Petralia, former Greek Minister of Tourism
- Alexandros Panagoulis, Greek politician and poet
- Elena Paparizou, Pop singer and Eurovision winner
- Giannis Parios, Greek singer
- Giannis Ploutarhos, Greek singer
- Antonis Remos, Greek singer
- Peja Stojaković, retired NBA player from Serbia
- Tolis Voskopoulos, Greek singer

== Historical population ==
Year	Population
1981	44,018
1991	63,306
2001	80,409
2011	87,305
2021	89,597

== Districts ==
- Agios Nikolaos, Glyfada
- Kolimvitirio
- Eksoni
- Evriali
- Pirnari
- Egli
- Ano Glyfada
- Terpsithea

== Twin cities ==
Glyfada is twinned with the following cities:

- Bayside, New South Wales, Australia
- Niš, Serbia
- Gżira, Malta
- Vidnoye, Moscow Oblast, Russia

== See also ==
- List of cities in Greece
- List of settlements in Attica
- List of municipalities of Attica
