= Greek Rugby Federation =

Administrative body of rugby union in Greece

Ελληνική Ομοσπονδία Ράγκμπυ
- Sport: Rugby union
- Founded: 2005
- World Rugby affiliation: 2009 (suspended 2014)
- RE affiliation: 2005

The Greek Rugby Federation (Ελληνική Ομοσπονδία Ράγκμπυ or ΕΟΡ) or Hellas Rugby Federation is the administrative body for rugby union in Greece.

== History ==
EOP was founded in 2005, and became affiliated to Rugby Europe (then known as FIRA-AER) in June of that year. The organisation represented Greece as a member of World Rugby (previously known as IRB) from 2009, until the Greek government removed its administrative authority in 2014. The Ministry of Culture and Sport withdrew Greek government recognition of the organisation in September 2014 due to the low number of active clubs participating in the sport. Control and development of rugby was passed to the Hellenic Handball Federation which announced it would begin a series of friendly matches between existing clubs until enough teams were established to reinstate an official competitive league.

In May 2023, the Greek General Secretariat of Sports restored recognition of the Greek Rugby Federation.

== See also ==
- Greece national rugby union team - men's national fifteen-a-side team.
- Greek Championship Rugby Union - the main domestic rugby competition (2005 to 2013).
