= Thessaloniki Lions RFC =

- Full name: Thessaloniki Lions Rugby Football Club
- Founded: 2008
- Location: Thessaloniki, Greece
- Ground(s): Papafio pitch
- Chairman: C. Batianis
- Coach(es): Zaza Navrozashvili
- Captain(s): Giannis Margaritopoulos
- League(s): Under development by Hellenic Handball Federation
Team kit

Official website
- www.thessalonikilions.com

Thessaloniki Lions RFC is a Greek rugby union club that was established in 2008 and since then participating in the Greek rugby union championship. It has more than 40 registered players. The club's best league position was second at the end of the 2012–2013 season. Since the 2013–2014 season, the club has joined the Unity Cup championship which brings together six other teams from the country. The club nowadays trains at Papafio pitch (Katsimidi street, Thessaloniki). The budget of the club is fueled solely by the contributions of the players since its creation.

== History ==
Rugby was played in Thessaloniki since the early 2000s, before the establishment of the Hellenic Rugby Federation in 2004. Spartakos Rugby Club was the predecessor of Thessaloniki Lions Rugby Club. Spartakos participated at the first national championship that took place during the 2004–2005 season. Spartakos Rugby Club managed to participate several times in the semi-finals of the Greek championship, usually divided in two groups (North and South), while later a round-robin format was introduced. The players practicing rugby before the 2004–2005 season were making long trips to Athens or across the border in Bulgaria in order to play matches.

In the end of the 2007–2008 season, a handful of players from the Spartakos Rugby Club decided to leave the club establish their own. This resulted in the (unofficial) founding of Thessaloniki Lions Rugby Club in May, 2008.

On October 10, 2008, Lions' first game was held at Evosmos against the local club of Makedones, where they got their first victory. The final score was '20-24'.

From the very first year onward, the Lions Rugby club has entered the national championship where the team qualified for the semi-final play-offs. Later on, in May 2010, Thessaloniki Lions play their first international match against a Serbian club, Krusevac Wolves, at Krusevac. After a big fight and lot of sweat, the team wins the game very hard by 28–29 against a young and voluntary team. A year after (2011), the club managed to finish third at the national championship after two Athenian clubs: Athens RFC and Attica Springboks. During the 2012–2013 season, after a tough championship start and a defeat against Iraklis RFC, the team becomes better throughout the season managing their first ever victory over defending champions Athens RFC at homeground. Lions won the match 16–8 on January 26, 2013; enabling them to dream of the title in 2013. According to the ranking of the federation, Thessaloniki Lions finish second. However, the participating teams file a claim in court for various irregularities made by the federation and its board of directors. In October 2013, the club decides to leave the national championship in order to join a championship which was not recognized by the national federation, named as: Unity Cup. It consisted of seven teams: Attica Springboks, Panathinaïkos (ex-Athens RFC), Spartans, Aeolos Patras, Peristeri and the Titans of Kavala. On November 2, 2013, the Lions play their first Unity Cup match against the Titans Kavala. After five seasons, the club leaves the national championship like six other teams of the country. In September 2014 an administrative decision issued by the Ministry of Sports in Greece announced the dissolution of the national federation of rugby for false declarations of clubs having a rugby activity in previous years. Indeed, the Greek law provides that a federation can exist only according to a threshold of official clubs which was denounced in this announcement.

On October 2, 2014, Lions played their third international match against the Kosovo Roosters of Pristina, which takes place in Skopje. This is a test match before the beginning of the second edition of the Unity Cup. Lions were defeated by 62–18.

=== Creation of the Club ===
After the separation and disappearance of the club Spartakos Thermaïkos, the club of Thessaloniki Lions is established in May, 2008 by former its players. They decide to build a new team with new bases in order to be more efficient. Three objectives guide the new club: the national championship, recognition in northern Greece and presence of players in the national team.

With about 20 registered players in 2008, the club now has more than 40 club members. The team has been present since its inception at all national organizations and events: XV or 15 Championships, Seven's tournaments, beach rugby. In 2010 the Lions team helped with the creation of a rugby union club in Kavala, Kavala Titans, which later join the AO Kavala.

==== Awards of the team ====
Thessaloniki Lions Rugby Club has participated in the Greek Championship since the club's establishment in 2008. The club also participates in the Greek Rugby 7's Championship on several occasions. During the 2009–2010 season, the club finished second, after losing in the final, on May 30, 2010, 22-12 from Athens RFC. Thessaloniki Lions have also participated in every beach rugby tournament organised by Kavala Titans and AO Kavala.

Greek Championship

- Semi-finalist: 2008–2009, 2009-2010
- Third place: 2010-2011
- Second place: 2012-2013

Greek Rugby 7's Championship

- Finalist: 2009-2010

Greek Beach Rugby Championship

- Participations: 2 teams in 2010
- Winner: 2011
- 3rd Place: 2015
- Participation of 2 teams in 2016

== Era of Zaza (2008-Now) ==
When the club was founded in 2008, it was the Georgian coach, Zaza Navrozashvili, who led the team's training. His experience as a former player of the Rustavi club in Georgia and Spartakos Thermaikos made him the most experienced, ready to take charge of the team.

For eight consecutive seasons he trains the players of Thessaloniki Lions in order to place the club among the top tier Greek clubs.

The last seasons, he takes charge of the training and the physical condition of the players during the summer period. He is the head coach of the team and covers most of the training.

More specific, his experience as a third-row player, has helped Thessaloniki Lions forwards and backs improve their skills and tactical game, inspired by defense. This has led the team have a good general technical level by playing an effective game of solid defense. The first signs of this success are characterized by the semi-final match in Rhodes in 2010 by defeating them with a score of 57–14 in the championship in October 2009. Coach Zaza imposes his plan of play offering a solid response to the players of Rhodes six months later with another win by: 24–14.

As the seasons progresses, the team becomes increasingly competitive with strong opposition against Panathinaikos RFC for three seasons before beating them in April 2013. In September 2013, Zaza Navrozashvili left Thessaloniki and Greece for time, after having lived there for more than 18 years. Later on, he returned to his team (Lions RFC) and starting making new preparations since there were new arrivals who wanted to learn the sport and play for the team. In October 2015 the Coach of Lions started a Serious training with the new teammates and tried to make them play test matches. In 26 of March, 2016 the Lions RFC (consisted of both old teammates and new entrants) played against Panathinaikos RFC in their own pitch in Thessaloniki where the game was very competitive and unfortunately came with a late loss (19-22).

== Rivalries ==
The rivalries of the Thessaloniki Lions are those against other clubs from the city of Thessaloniki: Iraklis Thessaloniki RFC. This is the classic derby of the city since the other club Makedones from the city of Evosmos no longer exists. The matches took place within the Greek rugby championship from the 2008–2009 season until the 2012–2013 season.

In the derby with Makedones Evosmos, the Lions record: 2 victories.

In the derby with Iraklis Thessaloniki, the Lions record: 1 victory, 1 draw, 3 defeats

== Infrastructures ==
The training of the team has taken place since the club's inception until March 2012, at the Environmental Park of Thermi, while official matches were played at Matta Sports Complex, at Néa Rédaisto. Since the spring of 2012, the team has also been training on a public field of Thermi's at Néa Rédaisto. Since 2014 Thessaloniki Lions were using as training ground the artificial pitch of Malakopi.

Starting from the 2015–2016 season, the team has a designated pitch at the center of Thessaloniki, the pitch is named PAPAFIO and its location is in Katsimidi street.

== Players in National selection ==
The team has been regularly feeding Greece's national rugby union team since its founding. The first selected players are present from the first team in Greece. Vaggelis Vassiliadis and Iannis Rizos then in Spartakos joined the team in 2005 and played against Azerbaijan in Baku. Then, several other players are called to strengthen the National: Stavros Bochoris and Georgios Gravalas. In 2008, the Greek team joined the top division and young players are called from the Lions, newly formed team: Thodoris Fotiou, Kostas Evaggelopoulos. At the same time, Greece's under-20 team is formed, also composed by many players of the Lions team: Larentzakis, Batianis, Terezakis, Evaggelopoulos. For some, the youth team will be the way to integrate the senior team such as Terezakis and Evaggelopoulos. Rizos and Bochoris continue to participate regularly in international FIRA-AER competitions.
