= Marousi 2004 =

Fullname	Α.Σ. Μαρούσι 2004
Department Establishment	1998
Team Colors	Green and white
League	Baseball League (Greece)
Season	2012
Position	Second

Marousi 2004 is a baseball team based in Marousi, Athens. They have won 5 Greek Baseball League titles which makes them the second more successful team in Greece after Spartakos Glyfadas.
