= Aris Baseball Club =

Aris Thessaloniki Baseball Club
- Full name: Σύλλογος Baseball Άρης Θεσσαλονίκης
- Founded: 2002
- League: Baseball League (Greece)
- Arena: Tagarades Baseball Arena
- Colors: Yellow and Black
- Season: 2006–2007
- Position: Second

Aris Thessaloniki Baseball Club is a baseball club based in Thessaloniki, Greece; it is owned by one of the biggest sports clubs in Greece, Aris Thessaloniki. The club was established in 2002 and is the only major baseball club in Macedonia and one of the most important in Greece.

From its first participation in the Hellenic Baseball League, Aris managed to finish in the first three places, being able to play in three international league cups.

Also Aris Baseball Club hosts the biggest baseball tournament in Greece every year in September–October, the Aris Baseball Cup.

In 2008, the club started a women's softball team, which participates at the Greek Softball Championship.

== Players ==
- Srdjan Milosavljevic
- Angelo Vadasis
- Apostolos Papaeuthimiou
- Tzortzis Markou
- Christos Testempasis
- Vasilis Dalakouras
- Dimitris Gazis
- Kostas Chatzimilioudis
- Jake Chamonikolas
- Andreas Kargakos
- Nikos Tsipouridis
- Spyros Krithis
- Laszlo Horvath
- Alex Tichenor
- Ellis Iliesku
- Thanos Stefos
- Thodoris Alexakis
- Stefanidis Vasilis
- Kadoglou Stratos
- Tsompanoglou Nikos
- Benevas Tolis
- Migniola Marco
- Gennaios Kostas
- Gennaios Christos
- Lampros Patouchas
- Giorgos Chatzimilioudis
- Modestos Kaskatis
- Krithis Nikos
- Reynaldo Cruanas Muzio
- Sam Pineda
- Makis Moustakas
- Milan Fatsis
- Omar Cuesta

== See also ==
- Aris Thessaloniki
- Baseball in Greece
