= Attica Springboks RFC =

- Full name: Attica Springboks Rugby Football Club
- Nickname(s): Springboks
- Founded: 2000
- Location: Athens, Greece
- President: (Greece) Anna Gounari
- Coach(es): (Greece) George Tsatsaronis (Men's)
- Captain(s): (Greece) Vassilis Vaiopoulos
Team kit

Official website
- atticaspringboks.gr

Attica Springboks RFC is a Greek rugby union and rugby league club in Athens. Many of the founding members were from South Africa, whose national team is called the Springboks, hence the name. The club plays both disciplines, Union and League. It is the one of few Greek Rugby clubs with an active and growing grass-roots Rugby academy with children from 5-17.

== Home Field ==
Attica Springboks home ground is at Zirineio Stadium in Kifissia and its practice ground is based at Glyka Nera municipal stadium north of Athens

== Youth academy, Women's team and Veterans team ==
Attica Springboks fields a youth academy with children aged 5–17, a women's team and a veterans team.

== History ==
The club was founded in October 2000. So far, it has won one championship in 2012.

== Titles ==
- Greek Championship Rugby Union (1): 2012
