= Greek Baseball League =

- Sport: Baseball
- Founded: 2000
- First season: 2000
- Folded: 2014
- President: P. Mitsiopoulos
- No. of teams: 8
- Country: Greece
- Confederation: Europe
- Last champion: Panathinaikos
- Most titles: Spartakos Glyfadas and Marousi 2004 (6)
- Level on pyramid: 1

Greek Baseball league was the top amateur baseball league in Greece. The inaugural season was held in 2000, and the first champions were Marousi 2004. The season began every March and concluded every November with the finals, a best-of-five series. Games were played exclusively on weekends.

In 2014, the Greek government decided to abolish the Greek Baseball Federation due to the low number of active clubs in this sport.

== Champions ==
Year	Team
2000	Marousi 2004
2001	Marousi 2004
2002	Marousi 2004
2003	Marousi 2004
2004	Spartakos Glyfadas
2005	Spartakos Glyfadas
2006	Spartakos Glyfadas
2007	Spartakos Glyfadas
2008	not held
2009	Spartakos Glyfadas
2010	Panthers Patras
2011	Marousi 2004
2012	Spartakos Glyfadas
2013	Marousi 2004
2014	Panathinaikos

== Performance by club ==
Σύλλογος	Τίτλοι	Χρονιές
Marousi 2004	6	2000, 2001, 2002, 2003, 2011, 2013
Spartakos Glyfadas	6	2004, 2005, 2006, 2008, 2009, 2012
Panthers Patras	1	2010
Panathinaikos	1	2014
