= Okinawan name =

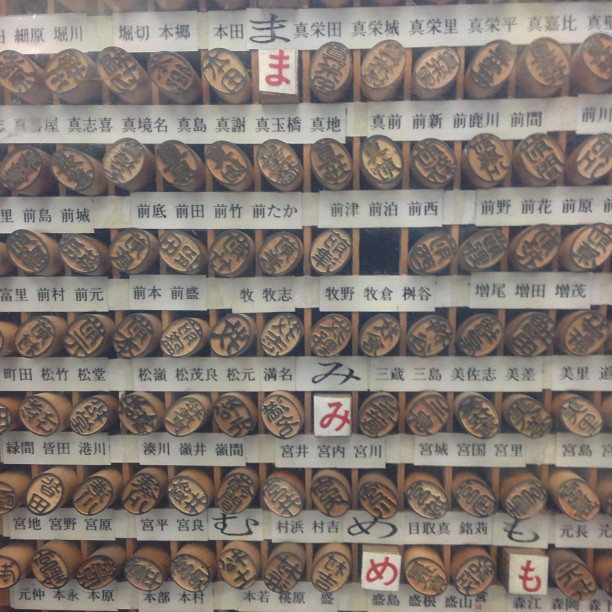
Okinawan last name Hanko seals in Tsurumi Okinawa Street

Okinawan names (Okinawan: 名/なー, nā) today have only two components, the family names (surnames or last names) first and the given names last. Okinawan family names represent the distinct historical and cultural background of the islands which now comprise Okinawa Prefecture in Japan. Expatriates originally from Okinawa also have these names.

== Modern names ==
As Japanese citizens, Okinawans today comply with the Japanese family register (koseki) system. Accordingly, an Okinawan name has only two components, a family name and a given name. A family name is called myōji (苗字 or 名字), uji (氏) or sei (姓), and a given name is called the "front name" (名前, namae) or "lower name" (下の名前, shita no namae). The family name precedes the given name. The given name may be referred to as the "lower name" because, in vertically-written Japanese, the given name appears under the family name.

Japanese family names generally show regional variation, but Okinawan family names are known for their distinctiveness. In contrast it becomes increasingly difficult to find unique Okinawan given names.

=== Top 10 popular Okinawan family names ===
This top 10 list is based on the name as written in kanji (Chinese characters). Since the Japanese language allows for multiple possible readings, or pronunciations, for each character, the reading of Okinawan family names written with the same characters varies. In addition, the Okinawan language has its own means of reading Japanese kanji, but some surnames like Nakama, Yara have the same reading in both languages.

Kanji	Okinawan Readings	Japanese/Yamato Readings	Well-known people
比嘉	Fija, Fiija	Higa	比嘉 栄昇 Eishō Higa (Begin), Ryan Higa, 比嘉 愛未 Manami Higa
金城	Kanagusuku	Kaneshiro, Kinjō	金城 武 Takeshi Kaneshiro, 金城 綾乃 Ayano Kinjō (Kiroro)
大城	Ufugusuku	Ōshiro	大城 ガクト Gakuto Oshiro, 大城 立裕 Tatsuhiro Oshiro, 大城 みさき Misaki Oshiro
宮城	Naagusuku	Miyagi, Miyashiro	ミヤギマモル Mamoru Miyagi, 宮城 長順 Chojun Miyagi
新垣	Arakachi	Arakaki, Aragaki, Shingaki, Niigaki	新垣 結衣 Yui Aragaki, 新垣 里沙 Risa Niigaki (Morning Musume)
玉城	Tamagusuku	Tamaki, Tamashiro	玉城 幸也 Yukinari Tamaki (Da Pump), 玉城 千春 Chiharu Tamashiro (Kiroro)
上原	Wiibaru	Uehara	上原 多香子 Takako Uehara (Speed)
島袋	Shimabuku	Shimabukuro	島袋 寛子 Gensei Shimabukuro, Hiroko Shimabukuro (Speed), Jake Shimabukuro
平良	Teera	Taira	平良 とみ Tomi Taira
山城	Yamagusuku	Yamashiro	山城 智二 Tomoji Yamashiro (FEC)

== Historical names ==
	大和名 Yamatu-naa Japanese (Yamato) style name			唐名 Kara-naa Chinese name	
童名 warabi-naa Childhood name	家名 kamei Family name	位階 ikai Title/Rank	名乗 nanui Given name	姓 sii Surname	諱 imina Given name
思五良; Umi-guraa	玉城; Tamagusuku	親方; Uwekata	朝薫; Chōkun	向 Shō	受祐; Juyū

As in mainland Japan, historical names in Okinawa are more complicated. People with different social statuses bore different kinds of names, maintained several names to use in different occasions, and sometimes changed them in their lifetime.

It was prohibited to have Japanese style name and Okinawan names underwent great changes after the Ryūkyū Kingdom fell under the Satsuma Domain's control.

=== Warabi-naa ===
Warabi-naa (warabe-na/warabi-naa, 童名) were personal names. For example, the warabi-naa of Tamagusuku Chōkun was Umi-guraa (思五良). Warabi-naa were most prevalent among Okinawans, from the king to commoners, both male and female. They were the oldest component of Okinawan names as, like people in mainland Japan, the inhabitants of Ryukyu islands did not originally have names for families, clans or lineages. They were used as the official names during the early era of the Ryukyu Kingdom. They appeared even in appointment letters by the king, written mostly in hiragana. It was during the 17th century that other name components prevailed among the pechin class.

A warabi-naa was given soon after birth. Although literally meaning childhood name, it was used by commoners for their entire life. While it was overshadowed by other name components, even adult male members of the pechin class used warabi-naa at home and when referring to their friends.

Later in history, stylized use of prefixes and suffixes differentiated social statuses. A commoner used neither a prefix nor suffix, a samurai used either a prefix or suffix, and an aristocrat used both a prefix and a suffix. For example, Tukū (徳) was a name for commoners, Umi-tukū (思徳) for samurai, and Umi-tuku-gani (思徳金) for aristocrats.

A set of warabi-naa appeared in the very beginning of recorded history and has not been changed since then. The number of warabi-naa pooled in society was extremely small. It was not uncommon for a warabi-naa to be shared by more than one person in a household. The first male child was usually named after his paternal grandfather. For example, the last king Shō Tai had the warabi-naa Umi-jiraa-gani (思次良金), which was also the name of his grandfather Shō Kō.

=== Kamei ===
Even in the Old Ryukyu era, social development led Okinawans to acquire names other than warabi-naa for disambiguation. Kamei (家名) or Yaa-n-naa (家の名), both meaning "family name", were often attached to warabi-naa. Kamei were toponyms, either the domains they ruled or the places of their origin. For example, an inscription of the Old Ryukyu era contains a personal name, Mafuto-kane Ufusato no Ufu-yakumoi (まふとかね 大さとの大やくもい), where Mafuto-kane (Mafutu-gani) was a warabi-naa, Ufusato (Ufusatu) was a place associated with him, and Ufu-yakumoi (Ufu-yakumui) was the title he was given.

In the naming conventions after the separation of the Peichin class from peasants, only the Pechin class was allowed to have kamei. Because the vast majority of the Pechin families lacked domains to rule, they inherited fixed kamei. In contrast, an upper class member used the name of the fief he was given by the king. This means that his kamei was changed every time a different land was allotted. For example, Makishi Chōchū (1818–1862) originally had the kamei Itarashiki (板良敷) but was then given a fief of Ōwan (大湾) before being finally renamed to Makishi (牧志).

In early times, kamei were written predominantly in hiragana. After the invasion of the Ryūkyū Kingdom by Japan's Satsuma Domain in 1609, the Japanese-style use of Chinese characters (kanji) was adopted. The Keichō Land Surveys of 1609–1611 probably conventionalized to some degree the choice of kanji for place names, and thus surnames based on them. In 1625 the Satsuma Domain instituted a ban on the use of Japanese-looking family names (大和めきたる名字の禁止, Yamato-mekitaru myōji no kinshi). As a result, the kanji used to write kamei changed from characters that were common in Japan to new, unique character combinations. For example, the name 東 (Higashi) was often changed to 比嘉 (Figa) or 比謝 (Fija), the name 前田 (Maeda) to 真栄田 (the same reading), 福山 (Fukuyama) to 譜久山 (the same reading), etc.

In practice, kamei represented a group who shared the founder of a relatively recent past. When it was necessary to distinguish branch families, the main family attached the prefix ufu (大, great) to its kamei while the suffix gwa (小, small), for example, was used for a branch family.

Officially, commoners did not have kamei. At some point in history, commoners in the capital region, Shuri and Naha, started to assume kamei. However, kamei of commoners were differentiated verbally and in writing. The last syllable of a commoner's kamei was lengthened (e.g. Arakachii) while that of a Pechin was not (e.g. Arakachi). For commoners, his warabi-naa is written first and is followed by his kamei. For example, Taraa (warabi-naa) from Yamagushiku was written as たら山城 (Taraa Yamagushiku).

Commoners in rural areas unofficially used names for households, which were also called Yaa-n-naa (屋の名). They were similar to yagō, private family names used by commoners in Japan.

=== Rank ===
Like in Japan, a rank (位階) was also part of the addressing system. The following was the list of ranks after they were fixed:

- Wōji (王子)
- Anji or Aji (按司)
- Uwekata (親方)
- Peechin (親雲上)
- Satunushi-peechin (里之子親雲上)
- Satunushi (里之子)
- Chikudun-peechin (筑登之親雲上)
- Chikudun (筑登之)

Young male members of the Pechin class who had no rank were addressed with honorific suffixes: shii (子) for the upper class and nyaa (仁屋) for the lower class. Commoners had no rank.

=== Nanui ===
Male members of the Pechin class adopted nanui (nanori/nanui, 名乗), or Japanese-style personal names, when they reached adulthood. Each nanui consists of two kanji characters, e.g. 朝薫 (Chōkun). The first character of a nanui, called nanui-gasira (nanori-gashira/nanui-gasira, 名乗頭), was shared by a lineage or munchū. For example, the character 朝 (chō) was used by branch families of the royal family including Chōkun (玉城朝薫), his father Chōchi (朝致) and his son Chōki (朝喜).

The direct reference to a nanui verbally and in writing was usually avoided because it was considered rude. In domestic documents, a Pechin was usually addressed by the combination of a kamei and a rank (e.g. Kyan Peekumi (喜屋武親雲上)). This was similar to the convention of Japan, e.g. Andō Tsushima-no-kami (安藤対馬守, Andō, Governor of Tsushima Province) for Andō Nobumasa. This combination can be found in as early as the first half of the 16th century. When necessary, a nanui was attached to the combination of a kamei and a rank. It is only a convention of historiography that people of the Ryūkyū Kingdom are referred to by the combination of a kamei and a nanui, e.g. Tamagusuku Chōkun (玉城朝薫).

Nanui came into use during the 17th century with obvious influence from Satsuma. The use of nanui-gashira is similar to that of tsūji (通字) in Japan. However, while tsūji was usually assumed only by the successor of a household, the first son in most cases, each nanui-gashira was shared by all the male member of a lineage.

=== Kara-naa ===
From 1689 male members of the Pechin class also had kara-naa (唐名) or Chinese names. Each kara-naa consists of a one-character name for a lineage called shii or uji (sei/shii, 姓 or uji/uji, 氏) and a personal name called imina (諱). For example, Tamagusuku Chōkun had the kara-naa Shō Juyū (向受祐). Kara-naa appeared neither officially nor privately in domestic affairs, but were used for diplomatic correspondence with Chinese dynasties. Thus a lower-class Pechin who had no post in the court had virtually no chance to use his kara-naa.

Names for Okinawan officials were recorded in early diplomatic documents written in Classical Chinese. They were actually corrupt forms of warabi-naa and kamei. For example, a-fu-sat-to 阿布薩都 and ō-sat-to 王察度 both referred to the kamei Ufuzatu (大里). Similarly, go-ratsu 呉剌 and tatsu-ro-ka-ne 達魯加禰 derived from warabi-naa Guraa (五良) and Taru-gani (樽金) respectively. It is during the 16th century that some officials used names that could be analyzed as Chinese surnames and given names. It seems that at first these names were coined each time they were needed for a diplomatic trip to China. Some families from which diplomats came for generations began to succeed the first character of their ancestors' transcribed names as shii. For instance, descendants of Mafutu-gani, who appeared as ma-botsu-to (麻勃都) in diplomatic records, adopted the shii Ma (麻) after him.

=== Munchū or lineages ===
The development of Okinawan naming conventions was closely related with that of munchū (monchū/munchū, 門中), or patrilineages. In 1689 Keizu-za or the Board of Genealogies (系図座) was established and all the Pechin lineages were ordered to compile genealogical records. In 1690 the royal court assigned one-character shii or Chinese surnames to all registered lineages. Since commoners were forbidden to compile genealogical records, this effectively separated the Pechin class from commoners. Genealogical records became a status symbol of the Pechin class. The Pechin class came to be referred to as keimochi (系持), lit. possessing genealogy, while commoners were called mukei (無系), lit. without genealogy.

Among the Pechin class, lineages were identified by the combination of the Chinese-style shii and the Japanese-style nanui-gashira. A lineage with the shii Mō (毛) shared the nanui-gashira Sei (盛), but this nanui-gashira was also used by a lineage named Ō (翁). Also, there was another lineage whose shii was Mō, but its nanui-gashira was An (安). Kamei cannot be a designator of lineages. The Mō lineage with the nanui-gashira Sei had was headed by the family with the kamei Tomigusuku (豊見城), but its branch families had various kamei including Kunigami (国頭) and Tomikawa (富川).

=== Royal house ===
The title Ō (王) or king was of foreign origin. In Okinawan, the king styled himself anji-osoi-jyanashi or later Shui-tin-jyanashi (首里天加那志). The king was referred to as ushu-jyanashi-me by his people and as myuumee-jyanashi or nuumee-jyanshi by his family members.

Close relatives of the king were given the ranks of wōji (王子) and anji (按司). Although wōji literally means the king's son, its conferrers were not limited to the king's son. A wōji or anji was referred to by his domain plus the suffix udun (御殿). The crown prince was traditionally given the domain Nakagusuku (中城) and therefore referred to as Nakagusuku-udun (中城御殿).

Many early kings, up to Shō Hō, had divine names (神号) in addition to warabi-naa. For example, Shō Gen's divine name was tida-hajimi-aji-sui (日始按司添). It seems that divine names were assumed after accession to the throne.

The king had a kara-naa and used it in diplomatic correspondence with China. The royal shii Shō (尚) was, according to Ryukyuan records, given to Shō Hashi by the Xuande Emperor of Ming China. This statement is highly questionable because no such record is found in Chinese documents and Shō Hashi used the shii even earlier. In 1692, the branch families of the royal house were given the shii Shō (向, note the different kanji) and the nanui-gashira Chō (朝) no matter how distant from the king.

=== Kumemura ===
A district near the capital named Kumemura is said to have been founded by immigrants from Fujian, China. Its raison d'être was to manage diplomatic contacts with China although some were later engaged in domestic affairs. The members of the community had kara-naa or Chinese names from the very beginning. It is known that they also had warabi-naa as early as the first half of the 15th century.

Today historical figures from Kumemura are often known by kara-naa, e.g. Sai On. He appeared in domestic documents as Gushichan Uwekata after his kamei Gushichan (具志頭) and his rank Uwekata (親方). He had a nanui Bunjaku (文若), and therefore is sometimes known as Gushichan Bunjaku.

=== Modernization ===
The Ryūkyū Kingdom was forced to become a Japanese feudal domain by the Meiji government in 1872, and it was formally annexed by Japan in 1879. Ryūkyūans were then entered into the Japanese family register (koseki) system and, as in Japan, surnames were extended to all citizens, no longer being the province of the aristocratic classes alone. A large number of the names created at this time were taken from geographical names or places of residence. Direct descendants of Tamagusuku Chōkun, who by the time assumed the kamei Hentona (辺土名), adopted Hentona as their new surname.

While the nobles had assumed new names when they reached adulthood, the new system forced them to adopt lifetime personal names soon after birth. At first, Japanese given names were often given when they entered school. For this reason, given names were informally called "school names" (学校名). Warabi-naa continued to be used unofficially until the early Shōwa period.

With increasing contacts with Japan, many Okinawans felt it inconvenient to use their alien-looking surnames. Since the law made it extremely difficult to change surnames, they often changed the reading of surnames while leaving their written forms unmodified. For example, Naagusuku (宮城) was usually changed to Miyagi (宮城). It is reported that, during the American military occupation after World War II, many managed to change their surname relatively easily. The family registers were completely destroyed by American attacks and reconstructed on individual declarations.

== See also ==
- Amami name
- Japanese name
- Okinawa Prefecture
- Ryukyuan culture
