= 新垣 =

新垣 is an East Asian character for a word or morpheme that means newly built wall or fence.

It may refer to:

- Aragaki, a common Japanese surname
- Arakaki, a common Japanese surname
- Niigaki, a common Japanese surname
- Shingaki, a common Japanese surname
- Xinyuan (disambiguation)#People, the pinyin transliteration of a common Chinese name
