= Kaneshiro =

Kaneshiro, Kinjō, Kanagusuku
- Languages: Japanese, Okinawan

Origin
- Meaning: Golden castle

Kaneshiro (金城) is a Japanese surname meaning "golden castle". The kanji used to write this surname may also be read Kinjō in on'yomi or Kanagusuku in the Okinawan language pronunciation. The former reading often indicates Okinawan origin, and the latter reading always does. Okinawans in mainland Japan with those two surnames sometimes change its reading to Kaneshiro without changing the characters. The surnames Kaneshiro and Kinjo are also found in the pass names of Koreans in Japan, formed by adding a second character to the common Korean surname Kim and then pronouncing the new name using Japanese rather than Korean reading.

People with the surname Kaneshiro include:

- Charles Y. Kaneshiro (1938--2002), an American politician
- Hideo Kaneshiro (金城 秀雄), Japanese rugby union player
- Kaneshiro Kofuku (金城 興福; 1953–2002), Japanese sumo wrestler of Korean descent
- Kazuki Kaneshiro (金城 一紀; born 1968), Japanese author of Korean descent
- Muneyuki Kaneshiro (金城宗幸; born 1987), Japanese manga artist
- Takeshi Kaneshiro (金城 武; born 1973), Japanese-Taiwanese actor and singer of Okinawan and Taiwanese descent

People with the surname Kinjō include:

- Aino Kinjō (金城 愛乃; born 1974), Japanese ten-pin bowler from Okinawa
- Tatsuhiko Kinjō (金城 龍彦; born 1976), Japanese baseball player of Korean descent
- Yamato Kinjo (金城 大和; born 1983), Japanese theatre actor from Okinawa
- Christopher Tatsuki Kinjo (金城 達樹; born 1993), Japanese football midfielder (J2 League) from Okinawa
- Justin Toshiki Kinjo (金城 俊樹; born 1997), Japanese football midfielder (2. Bundesliga) from Okinawa
