= Takue =

Japanese surname

Takue (written: 大工廻) is a Ryukyuan surname. It can alternatively be read as Dakujaku or Dakuzaku.

Only 140 people across Japan have this last name, making it highly uncommon.

== See also ==
- Okinawan name
