= Arakaki =

Arakaki (Okinawan: Arakachi) is a Ryukyuan surname. It literally means "new stone wall" or "wild enclosure", but it actually denotes the enclosure around a Shintō shrine. Notable people with the surname include:

- Alberto Arakaki, AKA japa (born 1972), Brazilian professional vert skater
- Ankichi Arakaki (1899–1927), Okinawan martial artist
- Dennis Arakaki (born 1943), American politician and social worker
- Ernesto Arakaki (born 1979), Peruvian football defender playing for Alianza Lima
- Hayato Arakaki, Japanese professional baseball player
- Hideyoshi Arakaki (born 1998), Peruvian footballer
- Hisako Arakaki (born 1977), Ryukyuan J-pop singer from Okinawa, Japan
- Hitoe Arakaki (born 1981), the oldest member of the J-pop group SPEED in Japan
- Kiyoshi Arakaki (born 1954), karate practitioner, historian & novelist
- Maria Eduarda Arakaki (born 2003), Brazilian rhythmic gymnast
- Nagisa Arakaki (born 1980), professional baseball player in Japan's Nippon Professional Baseball
- Seishō Arakaki (1840–1918), Okinawan martial artist
- Takayuki Arakaki (新垣 貴之; born 1996), Japanese footballer

== See also ==
- Arakaki v. State of Hawai'i
- Aragaki
- Arakaka
- Araki (disambiguation)
