= Ueekata (surname) =

Ueekata is a surname. Notable people with the surname include:

- Jana Ueekata (1549–1611), Ryukyuan aristocrat
- Tansui Ueekata (1623–1684), Ryukyuan aristocrat
