= Oshiro =

Ōshiro (Oshiro or Ooshiro) is the transliteration of several Japanese and Okinawan surnames. One of the names, 大城, means "big castle".

People with the name include:

- Gakuto Oshiro (大城 ガクト) (born 1973), Okinawan singer-songwriter and actor, commonly known as Gackt
- Kaz Oshiro (born 1967), Okinawa born artist based in Los Angeles
- Kūron Oshiro (尾城 九龍, born 1961) Japanese musical composer and arranger
- Matsumi Ōshiro (大城 松美, fl. 1980–1990), Japanese voice actress born in Tokyo
- Misaki Oshiro (大城 みさき; born 1984), Okinawan weightlifter
- Miwa Oshiro (大城 美和, born 1983), Japanese gravure idol, model and actress born to Okinawan father
- Nick Oshiro (born 1978), Japanese-American musician, drummer of the industrial metal band Static-X
- Tatsuhiro Oshiro (大城 立裕, born 1925), Okinawan novelist and playwright
- Toshihiro Oshiro (大城 利弘; born 1949), Okinawan martial artist
- Vanesa Oshiro (大城 バネサ; born 1981), Nikkei enka singer born in Argentina
- Yuto Oshiro (大城 佑斗, born 1996), Japanese footballer for Nagano Parceiro

== Fictional characters ==
- Mr. Oshiro (Celeste), a character in the video game Celeste
- Mr. Oshiro, a character in the TV series The Mysterious Benedict Society
