= Miyagi =

Miyagi may refer to:

- Miyagi Prefecture, one of the 47 major divisions of Japan
  - Miyagi District, Miyagi, a district in Miyagi Prefecture, Japan
- Miyagi, Gunma, a village in Japan; merged into Maebashi in 2004
- Miyagi (surname)
