= Tokurō =

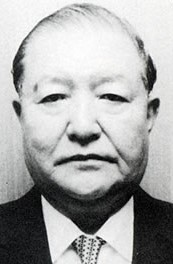
- Tokuro Adachi (1910–1988), Japanese politician
- Pronunciation: tokɯɾoɯ (IPA)
- Gender: Male

Origin
- Origin: Japanese
- Meaning: Different meanings depending on the kanji used

Other names
- Alternative spelling: Tokuro (Kunrei-shiki) Tokuro (Nihon-shiki) Tokurō, Tokuro, Tokurou, Tokuroh (Hepburn)

Tokurō is a masculine Japanese given name.

== Written forms ==
Tokurō can be written using different combinations of kanji characters. Some examples:

- 徳郎, "benevolence, son"
- 徳朗, "benevolence, clear"
- 得郎, "gain, son"
- 得朗, "gain, clear"
- 篤郎, "sincere, son"
- 竺郎, "bamboo, son"
- 啄郎, "peck, son"

The name can also be written in hiragana とくろう or katakana トクロウ.

== Notable people with the name ==
- Tokuro Adachi (足立 篤郎; 1910–1988), Japanese politician
- Tokuro Fujiwara (藤原 得郎; born 1961), Japanese video game designer
- Tokuro Irie (入江 徳郎; 1913–1989), Japanese journalist
- Tokuro Konishi (小西 得郎; 1894–1977), Japanese baseball player and manager
