= Tamagusuku Chōkun =

Tamagusuku Ueekata Chōkun (玉城 親方 朝薫; September 11, 1684 – March 1, 1734), also known by the Chinese-style name Shō Juyū (向 受祐), was a Ryūkyūan aristocrat-bureaucrat credited with the creation of the Ryūkyūan dance-drama form known as kumi odori.

Tamagusuku was born in what is today the Gibo neighborhood of Shuri. A member of the aristocrat-bureaucrat class of the Ryūkyū Kingdom, Tamagusuku had already journeyed to Edo and Kagoshima five times before being named udui bugyō (J: odori bugyō; Magistrate of Dance) in 1715. The title was first held by Tansui Ueekata (湛水親方, 1622-1683), and was a post chiefly responsible for organizing the formal entertainments of the Chinese investiture envoys to Ryukyu.

Having studied and viewed various Japanese dance and drama forms during his trips to Edo and Kagoshima, including Noh, kabuki and kyōgen, after regaining the title of udui bugyô in 1718, Tamagusuku formulated the dance-drama form known as kumi udui in Okinawan, and as kumi odori in Japanese. It was then performed for the first time, before the Chinese investiture envoys, on a chrysanthemum-viewing day, the ninth day of the ninth month of the lunar calendar, the following year.

The two plays performed that day are called Nidō Tichiuchi (The Vendetta of the Two Sons) and Shūshin Kani'iri (Possessed by Love, Thwarted by the Bell).

Though it's presumed that he wrote many more, five plays by Tamagusuku survive today, and are still performed. They are known today as Chōkūun no Goban ("The Chōkun Five Plays") or just Goban ("The Five Plays"). The other three are: Mekarushi, Kōkō nu Maki (Filial Piety), and Unna Munu Gurui (The Madwoman).
