= Nakama =

Nakama may refer to:

- Nakama (surname)
- Nakama, Fukuoka (中間), a city in Japan's Fukuoka Prefecture
- Nakama (guilds) (仲間), a type of Japanese merchant guild of the Edo period
- "Nakama" (song), a song by Zedd featuring Ai
