= Miyashiro (surname) =

Miyashiro (written: 都城, 宮代, 宮城) is a Japanese surname. 宮代 also be pronounced Miyadai. 宮城 also be pronounced Miyagi. In Okinawan language, 宮城 may be pronounced Naagusuku or Naagushiku. Notable people with the surname include:

- Akiho Miyashiro (都城 秋穂; 1920–2008), Japanese geologist
- Aldo Miyashiro (born 1976), Peruvian playwright, screenwriter and actor
- Augusto Miyashiro (born 1949), Peruvian engineer and politician
- Paulo Miyashiro, Brazilian triathlete
- Ron Miyashiro, American artist
- Tamari Miyashiro (born 1987), American volleyball player
