= Tensei Jingo =

Japanese newspaper column

Tensei Jingo (天声人語, literally, the voice of heaven is the voice of people) is the title of a column which appears on the front page of the Asahi Shimbun, a Japanese newspaper. It is a translation of the Latin phrase vox populi, vox dei ("The voice of the people is the voice of the gods"). The column is limited to 607 Japanese characters.

== History ==
The column first appeared in 1904 in the Osaka Asahi Shimbun. It was named by Nishimura Tenshu, the chief editor of Osaka Asahi Shimbun. The origin of the name is not clear, though it might be the translation of vox populi, vox dei, or "the voice of the people is the voice of god". In 1913, the Tokyo Asahi Shimbun started a similar column named Tojin Seijin (東人西人, Tōjin Seijin) until the end of August 1940. On the next day, both offices of the Asahi Shimbun changed the name of the column to Udai Mudai (有題無題, Udai mudai) and then on January 1, 1943, to Kamikaze-fu (神風賦, Kamikaze-fu). On September 6, 1945, the title of the column returned to Tensei Jingo.

== Characteristics ==
While appearing op-ed, the columns are actually written by professional newspaper reporters. The column often reflects on recent news, or other contemporary matters such as a change of seasons. It tends to find parallels or explanation in poetry, literature or folk customs. It may contradict the editorial opinion of the paper. Translations in English are published daily by the newspaper's online team.

Books containing the English translations are published for readers in Japan to practise their English. Special triangular "tenseijingo" pencils are sold in some stationery stores in Japan.

The column started under strong influence of English essay literature at the beginning of the 20th century. The Asahi Shimbun advertised that short essays in the Tensei Jingo were frequently cited in entrance examinations to universities. Notebooks with a format for recording and copying Tensei Jingo articles by hand have been sold.

== Writers ==
The writers were top journalists of the Asahi Shimbun at that time.

- Ryuichi Kaji – Between September 1945 and April 1946
- Hideo Aragaki – Between May 1946 and April 1963
- Tokuro Irie – Between May 1963 and April 1970
- Keiichiro Hikita – Between May 1970 and February 1973
- Junro Fukaya – Between February 1973 and November 1975
- Kazuo Tatsuno – Between December 1975 and August 1988
- Kensaku Shirai – Between August 1988 and August 1995
- Wataru Kurita – Between August 1995 and March 2001
- Tamio Oike – Between April 2001 and March 2004
- Ikuo Takahashi – Between April 2004 and March 2007
- Shinji Fukushima – Started April 2007
- Tadashi Tominaga – Started April 2007

== Other Japanese newspapers ==
Other Japanese newspapers have similar columns, for instance Yomiuri Shimbun has a column (Henshū Techō, 編集手帳), Mainichi Shimbun has a column (Yoroku, 余録), Tokyo Shimbun has a column (Hissen, 筆洗) and Nihon Keizai Shimbun has a column (Shunjū, 春秋).
