= List of Kamen Rider Geats characters =

The main heroes of Kamen Rider Geats. From left to right: Michinaga Azuma, Ace Ukiyo, Keiwa Sakurai, and Neon Kurama.

Kamen Rider Geats (仮面ライダーギーツ, Kamen Raidā Gītsu) is a Japanese tokusatsu series that serves as the 33rd installment in the Kamen Rider franchise and the fourth entry in the Reiwa era.

== Main characters ==
=== Ace Ukiyo ===
Ace Ukiyo (浮世 英寿, Ukiyo Ēsu) is a mysterious man who was born in the year 21 BCE as the son of a previous DGP navigator Mitsume and an unnamed previous "Dezashin" (デザ神; Desire Deity), who acquired the ability to reincarnate from his subconscious need to find his mother. After competing in the first DGP and its subsequent tournaments, unaware of his parents' past involvements, he gained additional abilities and earned the title of Dezashin for his undefeated winning streak throughout his succeeding reincarnations across the centuries while attempting to wish for Mitsume's return so he can ask her why she granted him his initial ability. In the present, after losing his pet dog Constantine in a car accident and graduating from high school, Ace becomes a celebrity, referred to as the "Star of the Stars of the Stars" (スター・オブ・ザ・スターズ・オブ・ザ・スターズ, Sutā Obu Za Sutāzu Obu Za Sutāzu), after winning the "Daybreak" DGP and later makes DGP staff members Tsumuri and Girori part of his family after winning the "Encounter" DGP, intending to use the wish he will gain from winning the "Conspiracy" DGP to further infiltrate the organization and uncover the reason behind Mitsume's disappearance. As rules are put in place to limit him, his reincarnations come to light before Ace declares war on the DGP upon discovering what the tournament organizer Suel did to his parents. Ace manages to prevent Suel from erasing the world by fully awakening the power he inherited from his mother, becoming the Creator God (創世の神, Sōsei no Kami) and recreating the world based from his memory with everyone aware of the now absent DGP's existence. Ever since acquiring the power of the Boost Mark III Buckle, Ace prepares his death at the hands of Black Tsumuri, to revive himself as a god per Mitsume's tips, and properly destroys Suel, thereby erasing the DGP and restoring peace properly.

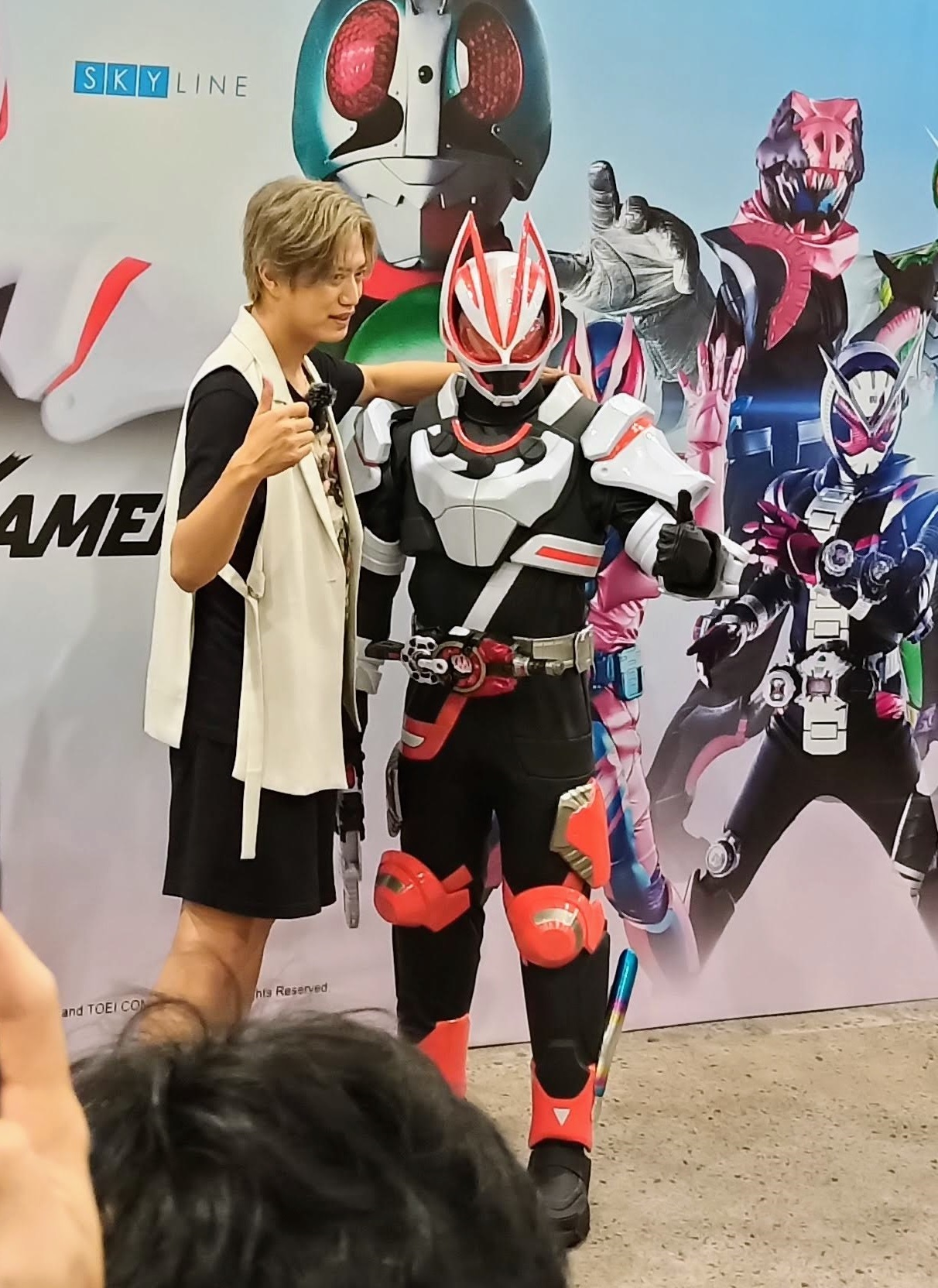
The official suit of Kamen Rider Geats at a comic con in Vietnam, posing with Masahiro Inoue.

Utilizing the Desire Driver, Ace can transform into the fox-themed Kamen Rider Geats. While transformed, he wears the Geats Tail (ギーツテイル, Gītsu Teiru) scarf. His primary Form Raise Buckles are Magnum and Boost, which allow him to assume Magnum Form (マグナムフォーム, Magunamu Fōmu) and Boost Form (ブーストフォーム, Būsuto Fōmu) respectively. He can also use the Magnum and Boost Buckles at once to assume either Magnum Boost Form (マグナムブーストフォーム, Magunamu Būsuto Fōmu) or Boost Magnum Form (ブーストマグナムフォーム, Būsuto Magunamu Fōmu). Magnum Form first appears in the film Kamen Rider Revice the Movie: Battle Familia.

- During the "Conspiracy" DGP, Ace acquires a Fever Slot Buckle, which he can use alongside either the Magnum Buckle to assume Fever Magnum Form (フィーバーマグナムフォーム, Fībā Magunamu Fōmu) or the Boost Buckle to assume Fever Boost Form (フィーバーブーストフォーム, Fībā Būsuto Fōmu). In both of these forms, his Geats Tail evolves into the golden Fever Cross Tail (フィーバークロステール, Fībā Kurosu Tēru).
- During the "Divergence" DGP, Ace acquires Kamen Rider Seeker's Powered Builder Buckle, which he can use either on its own to assume Powered Builder Form or alongside the Boost Buckle to assume Powered Builder Boost Form (パワードビルダーブーストフォーム, Pawādo Birudā Būsuto Fōmu).
- During the "Lamentation" DGP, Ace acquires the Boost Mark II Buckle, which he can use either on its own to assume the evolved Boost Form Mark II (ブーストフォームマークII, Būsuto Fōmu Māku Tsū) or alongside Ziin's Laser Raise Riser to assume the hybrid Laser Boost Form (レーザーブーストフォーム, Rēzā Būsuto Fōmu).
- During the "Longing" DGP, Ace acquires the Boost Mark III Buckle, which he can use either in its one-piece state to assume the incomplete Boost Form Mark III (ブーストフォームマークIII, Būsuto Fōmu Māku Surī) or as the two-piece Boost Mark IX Buckle to transform into his kitsune-themed final form; Kamen Rider Geats IX (仮面ライダーギーツIX, Kamen Raidā Gītsu Nain).
- During the events of the Hyper Battle DVD special Kamen Rider Geats: How Is It!? Desire Grand Prix Filled With Men, I Am Ouja!!, Ace acquires a Kamen Rider Ryuki-themed version of the V-Buckle Buckle, which allows him to assume Ryuki Form (龍騎フォーム, Ryūki Fōmu).

Ace Ukiyo is portrayed by Hideyoshi Kan (簡 秀吉, Kan Hideyoshi). As a child, Ace is portrayed by Yūya Andō (安東 勇弥, Andō Yūya). Ace's five previous incarnations Ace (エース, Ēsu), A (エー, Ē), Ace Garfield (エース・ガーフィールド, Ēsu Gāfīrudo), Ace Yakumo (八雲 栄守, Yakumo Eisu), and Ace Lee (エース・リー, Ēsu Rī) are portrayed by unknown actors.

==== Four Aces ====
The Four Aces (4人の英寿, Yo-nin no Ēsu) refers to the four iterations of Ace Ukiyo in the film Kamen Rider Geats the Movie: Four Aces and the Black Fox. As a result of Mela's machinations, Ace splits into four versions of himself, each representing one of his four key traits and thus losing the power of creation. Mela absorbs three of the clones to become Kamen Rider X Geats, forcing the remaining clone to fight against the former when his comrades are defeated.

As with the original Ace, his four split clones are also portrayed by Hideyoshi Kan.

- Ace of Power (力の英寿, Chikara no Ēsu): The clone who represents Ace's brute strength, though his lack of common sense means that he requires the help of others to guide him.
- Ace of Wisdom (知恵の英寿, Chie no Ēsu): The clone who represents Ace's genius intellect, but at the cost of having motion sickness and poor physical fitness.
- Ace of Luck (運の英寿, Un no Ēsu): The clone who represents Ace's amazing luck, able to turn the probability of the situation to his favor.
- Ace of Heart (心の英寿, Kokoro no Ēsu): The clone who represents Ace's heart, bearing the strongest will despite being the weakest. He was left behind when Mela absorbed the other clones to become Kamen Rider X Geats. Despite being useless in the field, Ace tries to prevail and his resolve resonates with the rest of the DGP Riders to create the Geats Oneness ID Core, the Oneness Buckle, and the Kamen Rider Geats (Oneness Ver.) Ride Chemy Card. Using these items alongside the Boost Mark III Buckle, Ace can transform into an evolution of Geats IX known as Kamen Rider Geats Oneness (仮面ライダーギーツワンネス, Kamen Raidā Gītsu Wan'nesu), allowing him to compensate for the lack of his power of creation and fight on par with Kamen Rider X Geats.

==== Future Ace ====
The white-haired version of Ace Ukiyo is his future self from 1,000 years later which appeared in the V-Cinema Kamen Rider Geats: Jyamato Awaking. (Note: In the V-Cinema, he is credited as Ace (エース, Ēsu).) Unable to prevent God Jyamato's uprising and losing his friends in the process, Ace becomes nihilistic and collaborates with the alternate Niramu to return to the past to prevent God Jyamato's reawakening, fighting against his former friends and present self in the process. However, as they were able to avert the crisis on their own, the future Ace became convinced to trust humans once again and returned to his original timeline.

The future Ace acquires the Dooms Geats Buckle, which allows him to transform into the sky fox-themed Kamen Rider Dooms Geats (仮面ライダードゥームズギーツ, Kamen Raidā Dūmuzu Gītsu).

Being the Ace Ukiyo from the future, he is also portrayed by Hideyoshi Kan (簡 秀吉, Kan Hideyoshi).

=== Keiwa Sakurai ===
Keiwa Sakurai (桜井 景和, Sakurai Keiwa) is a passive and caring, albeit naive, job-hunting university student who lives with his older sister after their parents were killed during a previous DGP despite being civilians and joins the "Encounter" DGP in the hopes of achieving his desire of "world peace", which stems from his volunteer work at non-profit organizations and childhood dream of becoming a guardian ninja. Throughout his time in the tournament, he records himself via video phone to archive his experience in case he loses his memories, with Tsumuri allowing it after Keiwa assures her that they are intended for his eyes only. After sustaining injuries that cause him to be eliminated during the penultimate round of the tournament, Keiwa temporarily loses his motivation until he becomes forcibly involved in the "Conspiracy" DGP, where Ace helps him regain his memories while Girori provides him with a new Desire Driver from a retiring player. Following this, Keiwa competes to fulfill his new wish of reviving dead DGP players and gains a job at his favorite soba restaurant.

Following his encounter with Daiji Igarashi and Kagero during the events of the crossover film Kamen Rider Geats × Revice: Movie Battle Royale, Keiwa discovers he possesses a powerful inner demon who wants to maintain world peace despite sharing his host's internal struggle. Later, after Sara's supposed demise, his inner demon is able to possess him. Consumed by his inner demon's possession, Keiwa's granted wish during the second round of the "Creation" DGP goes horribly wrong, unknowingly reviving irredeemable criminals who died in previous tournaments with his recently revived family killed by Kamen Rider Tarbon. Ace temporarily sacrifices his own freedom to undo Keiwa's mistaken wish, and had Daichi make amends by making a serum to revive and free innocent casualties from the previous events, starting from Sara, allowing Keiwa to return to the righteous. After that, Keiwa decides to forgive Ace's mother, Michinaga, & Daichi for his misunderstanding. With the DGP erased at the cost of losing the memory of Ace's existence, Keiwa's wish for true world peace has been fulfilled, and he is currently studying for a job.

Utilizing the Desire Driver, Keiwa can transform into the tanuki-themed Kamen Rider Tycoon (仮面ライダータイクーン, Kamen Raidā Taikūn). While transformed, he wears the Tycoon Bandage (タイクーンバンデージ, Taikūn Bandēji), which increases his luck. His primary Form Raise Buckle is Ninja, which allows him to assume Ninja Form (ニンジャフォーム, Ninja Fōmu).

- During the "Conspiracy" DGP, Keiwa acquires a Fever Slot Buckle, which he can use alongside the Ninja Buckle to assume Fever Ninja Form (フィーバーニンジャフォーム, Fībā Ninja Fōmu). In this form, his Tycoon Bandage evolves into the golden Fever Cross Bandage (フィーバークロスバンデージ, Fībā Kurosu Bandēji).
- During the "Creation" DGP, Keiwa acquires the Bujin Sword Buckle, which allows him to assume his eponymous final form. He can also replace its left-half with another Raise Buckle to assume a variant of his Bujin Sword form, such as Bujin Monster (ブジンモンスター, Bujin Monsutā) via the Monster Buckle or Bujin Boost (ブジンブースト, Bujin Būsuto) via the Boost Buckle. Following his redemption after a redeemed Daichi revived Sara, his Bujin Sword form is purified into a fully red-eyed state.
- During the events of the web special Geats Extra: Kamen Rider Tycoon Meets Kamen Rider Shinobi, Keiwa acquires the Shinobi Buckle, which allows him to assume Shinobi Form (シノビフォーム, Shinobi Fōmu).

Keiwa Sakurai and his inner demon are portrayed by Ryuga Sato (佐藤 瑠雅, Satō Ryūga).

=== Neon Kurama ===
Neon Kurama (鞍馬 祢音, Kurama Neon) is the only stepdaughter of a wealthy and strict family led by her father, Kōsei, and a social media influencer who desires to find a decent lover who can help her live a normal life peacefully. She is later revealed to have been wished into existence by Kōsei in the form of the Kurama family's biological daughter Akari (あかり), who was kidnapped and killed by Kazuo Numabukuro, amidst his failed ransom attempt years prior. Due to what happened, Neon is protected by foreign bodyguards hired by her abusive mother Irumi. Following her participation in the "Encounter" DGP, Neon returns to being her parents' subservient daughter until Kōsei allows her to compete in subsequent tournaments, during which she learns of her family's connection to the organization and her origins before she is encouraged by her supporter, Kyuun, to overcome her past and move forward to honor Akari's memory. During the "Creation" DGP, Neon reconciles with her stepparents, and temporarily loses her first and only best friend, Sara until a redeemed Daichi revives her. With the DGP erased at the cost of losing the memory of Ace's existence, Neon is joined by Kyuun, who is now her producer for her streaming shows.

Utilizing the Desire Driver, Neon can transform into the black cat-themed Kamen Rider Na-Go (仮面ライダーナーゴ, Kamen Raidā Nāgo). While transformed, she wears a pair of Na-Go Bangles (ナーゴバングル, Nāgo Banguru), which grant superhuman strength. Her primary Form Raise Buckle is Beat, which allows her to assume Beat Form (ビートフォーム, Bīto Fōmu).

- During the "Conspiracy" DGP, Neon acquires a Fever Slot Buckle, which she can use alongside the Beat Buckle to assume Fever Beat Form (フィーバービートフォーム, Fībā Bīto Fōmu). In this form, her Na-Go Bangles evolve into the golden Fever Cross Bangles (フィーバークロスバングル, Fībā Kurosu Banguru).
- During the "Creation" DGP, Neon acquires the Fantasy Buckle, which allows her to assume Fantasy Form (ファンタジーフォーム, Fantajī Fōmū).

Neon Kurama is portrayed by Yuna Hoshino (星乃 夢奈, Hoshino Yuna). As a child, Neon is portrayed by Natsuki Matsuoka (松岡 夏輝, Matsuoka Natsuki), who also portrays Akari.

=== Michinaga Azuma ===
Michinaga Azuma (吾妻 道長, Azuma Michinaga) is a construction worker, former high school delinquent, and the runner-up of the "Daybreak" DGP with an ambitious desire to surpass Ace Ukiyo, whom he considers a rival and blames for the death of his best friend and fellow former delinquent, Tōru Imai, who Ace failed to save from traitorous Kamen Riders during a previous DGP. Ever since, Michinaga became cynical, believing that all Riders are self-serving, and competes in the DGP to fulfill Tōru's desire for a landmark in his hometown along with his own to destroy the Kamen Riders and eventually the DGP itself. After Ace is eliminated during the "Conspiracy" DGP, Michinaga's overconfidence leads to him being fatally wounded during the final round. Following the tournament's conclusion, Michinaga's body ends up in Archimedel's garden, where he is resurrected due to prolonged usage of the Zombie Buckle, and escapes. Despite being brought back to the Jyamato garden by Niramu and Samasu to be killed, Beroba intervenes and convinces Michinaga to fight for the Jyamato to achieve his wish. He eventually wins the JGP, becomes the "Jyamashin" (ジャマ神; Jyamato Deity), and sets out to fulfill his wish as well as destroy the DGP. But his wish to destroy solely other Kamen Riders made him weak against non-Kamen Rider combatants like the Jyamato, which remained in effect after Ace restored Michinaga's humanity in the aftermath of the Desire Royale's finale. He regains part of his power in order to kill Beroba in the near end of the "Creation" DGP, though. Ultimately, Michinaga begins to discard his ego and atone for his past deeds, when Daichi infected Keiwa's sister, Sara, with a Stage 2 parasite Jyamato and tricks the former into seemingly murdering her by mistake that leads to Keiwa's downfall, much to his horror. With the DGP erased at the cost of losing the memory of Ace's existence, Michinaga finally moves on from Tōru's passing.

During the events of the crossover film Kamen Rider Geats × Revice: Movie Battle Royale, which is set between his death and waking up in Archimedel's garden, Michinaga is temporarily revived for the Desire Royale.

Utilizing the Desire Driver, Michinaga can transform into the water buffalo-themed Kamen Rider Buffa (仮面ライダーバッファ, Kamen Raidā Baffa). While transformed, he wears the Buffa Muleta (バッファムレータ, Baffa Murēta), which increases his fighting spirit and win rate. His primary Form Raise Buckle is Zombie, which allows him to assume Zombie Form (ゾンビフォーム, Zonbi Fōmu).

- During the "Conspiracy" DGP, Michinaga acquires a Fever Slot Buckle, which he can use alongside the Zombie Buckle to assume Fever Zombie Form (フィーバーゾンビフォーム, Fībā Zonbi Fōmu). In this form, his Buffa Muleta evolves into the golden Fever Cross Muleta (フィーバークロスムレータ, Fībā Kurosu Murēta). After becoming the Jamashin, he gains access to an enhanced version of Fever Zombie Form.
- During the "Divergence" DGP, Michinaga acquires a Jyamato Buckle, which allows him to assume Jyamato Form (ジャマトフォーム, Jamato Fōmu). He can also use the Zombie and Jyamato Buckles at once to assume either Zombie Jyamato Form (ゾンビジャマトフォーム, Zonbi Jamato Fōmu) or Jyamato Zombie Form (ジャマトゾンビフォーム, Jamato Zonbi Fōmu).
- During the events of the Hyper Battle DVD special Kamen Rider Geats: How Is It!? Desire Grand Prix Filled With Men, I Am Ouja!!, Michinaga acquires a Kamen Rider Ouja-themed version of the V-Buckle Buckle, which allows him to assume Ouja Form (王蛇フォーム, Ōja Fōmu).
- During the events of the V-Cinema Kamen Rider Geats: Jyamato Awaking, Michinaga acquires the Plosion Rage Buckle, which allows him to assume his eponymous final form.

Michinaga Azuma is portrayed by Kazuto Mokudai (杢代 和人, Mokudai Kazuto).

=== Tsumuri ===
Tsumuri (ツムリ) is a mysterious navigator for the DGP who provides the players with equipment and information while reporting to her masked superior, later revealed to be Girori. After Ace wins the "Encounter" DGP, he uses his wish to make Tsumuri his older sister, much to her dismay despite being disgusted by her co-workers attempting to sabotage Ace. Nonetheless, she gradually opens up to Ace and the other DGP Kamen Riders before manifesting abilities similar to the Creation Goddess'. But her awakened ability makes her a new target of the DGP members who are loyal to Suel, who wants her to be their replacement Creation Goddess, until Ace absorbs it from her while temporarily costing his own freedom. Alongside Kyuun and Ziin, Tsumuri is spared from being erased by Ace when he erased the DGP from existence.

Tsumuri is portrayed by Kokoro Aoshima (青島 心, Aoshima Kokoro).

== Recurring characters ==
=== DGP ===
The Desire Grand Prix (デザイアグランプリ, Dezaia Guran Puri), abbreviated as DGP, is a cult-like totalitarian organization which governs the future, where Earth was ruined and abandoned and the entire human race exists as data beings, that hosts a survival reality show of the same name that can be viewed across time and space. Originally, the competitors only fought for fame and glory with no casualties, their only prize being a gold coin and recognition as the strongest warriors of their time. This changed when the organization decided to increase the stakes by recruiting players to become Kamen Riders and defeat the mysterious "Jyamato" in a series of tournaments in exchange for granting the winner's wish. Once a chosen participant joins, they are bound by the game's rules, such as protecting civilians from Jyamato, and are forced to keep playing until they are either killed, removed from reality, disqualified, or find a replacement and returned to their regular lives with no memory of the DGP nor motivation towards fulfilling their wish.

During the "Divergence" DGP, new rules are instated in response to Ace's winning streak and Girori's misconduct, including allowing viewers to vote for the winner of each round and the players having to determine and eliminate the player designated as the "Dezastar" (デザスター, Dezasutā; Desire Star), who has been given secret orders from the DGP staff before they reach the final round and automatically win the season. However, Beroba's faction and the Jyamato steal the Game Master's Vision Driver and replace the DGP with a full-scale invasion-themed survival series called the Jyamato Grand Prix (ジャマトグランプリ, Jamato Guran Puri), abbreviated as JGP. Suel eventually changes the game's format into a second season of the Desire Royale where the winner gets to decide the fate of the DGP and the world with the additional rule that those who get eliminated are forever banned from becoming Kamen Riders. However, it turns out to be part of the Grand End (グランドエンド, Gurando Endo), an emergency initiative where the entire management will return to their original world and leaving those behind with their memories wiped out.

With Suel's death, Ace erases the DGP from existence and undoes their damage, with Ziin, Kyuun, and Tsumuri being spared, and Girori voluntarily letting himself be erased along with the staff who are loyal to Suel. To commemorate Ace's sacrifice, the DGP is reformed under Ziin's new direction.

Each participant carries a Desire Driver (デザイアドライバー, Dezaia Doraibā) belt, which can combine with a personalized ID Core (IDコア, Ai Dī Koa) (Note: ID Core is also known as Rider Core ID (ライダーコアID, Raidā Koa Ai Dī) in merchandise.) disc to transform them into a base Entry Form (エントリーフォーム, Entorī Fōmu) (Note: Entry Form is also known as Entry Raise Form (エントリーレイズフォーム, Entorī Reizu Fōmu) in merchandise.) Kamen Rider, and a Spider Phone (スパイダーフォン, Supaidā Fon), which can switch between Phone Mode (フォンモード, Fon Mōdo) and Spider Mode (スパイダーモード, Supaidā Mōdo). The Riders can also equip their Desire Driver with up to two Raise Buckles; which they can earn from Mission Boxes (ミッションボックス, Misshon Bokkusu) by defeating Jyamato, completing Secret Missions (シークレットミッション, Shīkuretto Misshon), or getting help from their Supporters (サポーター, Sapōtā), fans from the future, to gain additional armor with multiple configurations, with rare Jyamato offering stronger Raise Buckles.

The Supporters utilize Raise Riser Cards (レイズライザーカード, Reizu Raizā Kādo) in conjunction with the Laser Raise Riser (レーザーレイズライザー, Rēzā Reizu Raizā) raygun to transform into a customized Kamen Rider form that embodies the user's desires. A Supporter with the DGP's premium membership can use a dark copy of their Raise Riser Card called a Black Raise Riser Card (ブラックレイズライザーカード, Burakku Reizu Raizā Kādo) to transform into a Jyamato-esque warrior known as a Premium (プレミアム, Puremiamu).

High-ranking DGP staff members utilize the Providence Card (プロビデンスカード, Purobidensu Kādo) in conjunction with the Laser Raise Riser's successor, the Vision Driver (ヴィジョンドライバー, Vijon Doraibā) belt, to transform into an eyeball-themed Kamen Rider, which grants them access to the Creation Goddess (創世の女神, Sōsei no Megami) and approve the winner's wish. The Game Master (ゲームマスター, Gēmu Masutā) possesses one to manage the DGP's system while Niramu possesses the second.

Like the participants of DGP, members of the DGP guard also utilize the Desire Drivers to transform into Guard Riders (警備隊ライダー, Keibitai Raidā), with a task to preserve the tournament's rules from being violated.

==== Girori ====
Girori (ギロリ) is the salon concierge of the DGP who is later revealed to be the organization's masked Game Master. Realizing that Ace is using his winning streak to infiltrate the DGP, despite managing to conceal his true position when Ace used his wish from winning the "Encounter" DGP to make the man his father, Girori decides to have him eliminated in the next tournament with Win's help. When Ace outwits Win, Girori decides to break the rules and abuse his position to intervene personally by becoming Kamen Rider Glare during the "Conspiracy" DGP's penultimate round and force an unwilling Win to eliminate Ace. Upon learning Ace planned ahead and had himself reinstated with full knowledge of Girori's identity, the latter abuses his position to arrange for Keiwa and Neon to kill Ace for him, but they expose him during a broadcast, leading to Niramu firing Girori. Upon his return in the DGP's finale, Girori ultimately learns the truth about the dark side of the organization and joins Ace's side. Once Suel is killed, Girori voluntarily lets himself be erased alongside other DGP staffs who are loyal to Suel.

Utilizing the Vision Driver, Girori can transform into the black-colored Kamen Rider Glare (仮面ライダーグレア, Kamen Raidā Gurea). While transformed, he gains the use of five Hypnoray (ヒュプノレイ, Hyupunorei) drones, which can attach onto other Riders to force them into serving as his GM Rider (GMライダー, Jī Emu Raidā; Game Master) puppets and become living bombs, for combat assistance.

Girori is portrayed by Shugo Oshinari (忍成 修吾, Oshinari Shūgo).

==== Win Hareruya ====
Win Hareruya (晴家 ウィン, Hareruya Win) is an energetic former punk rock guitarist of Weather Hearts (ウェザーハーツ, Wezā Hātsu) who tried to become a famous musician. Unfortunately, following his band's unexpected disbandment, Win almost suffered a midlife crisis, until he took a part-time job as a DGP staff member instead with help from his grandfather, whose company sponsors the organization. He initially appears in the "Encounter" DGP as a mysterious guest Rider for the teamwork round following Kanato Sumida's elimination, during which he is instructed to conceal his identity from the other participants. Following this tournament's end, Win resolves to become more than a silent non-player Rider in the "Conspiracy" DGP while Girori tasks him with sabotaging Ace. However, the other Kamen Riders learn of Win's motives when Michinaga catches him in the act of sabotaging Ace, resulting in Win eventually losing his DGP privileges for leaking vital information on the organization to Ace and being turned into a GM Rider by Girori, who thought he had killed him in an attempt to destroy Ace. However, Win survived Girori's attempt but suffers heavy injuries, until Suel recovers him during the second Desire Royale tournament. Nevertheless, Win remains to aid Ace behind the scenes. With the DGP erased at the cost of losing the memory of Ace's existence, Win got his old rock band back together and becomes famous without any compromises.

Utilizing the Desire Driver, Win can transform into the grizzly bear/jack-o'-lantern-themed Kamen Rider PunkJack (仮面ライダーパンクジャック, Kamen Raidā Panku Jakku). While transformed, he wears the PunkJack Cloak (パンクジャックマント, Panku Jakku Manto), which grants superhuman jumping. His primary Form Raise Buckle is Monster, which allows him to assume Monster Form (モンスターフォーム, Monsutā Fōmu).

- During the "Conspiracy" DGP, Win acquires a Fever Slot Buckle, which he can use alongside the Monster Buckle to assume Fever Monster Form (フィーバーモンスターフォーム, Fībā Monsutā Fōmu). In this form, his PunkJack Cloak evolves into the golden Fever Cross Cloak (フィーバークロスマント, Fībā Kurosu Manto).
- During the events of the web special Geats Extra: Kamen Rider PunkJack, Win's past reveals that he initially started out working for the DGP as a Guard Rider before receiving his own ID Core to become Kamen Rider PunkJack. Like Na-Go, his original primary Form Raise Buckle was Beat, which he could use to assume Beat Form.

Win Hareruya is portrayed by Tsubasa Sakiyama (崎山 つばさ, Sakiyama Tsubasa).

==== Niramu ====
Niramu (ニラム) is the producer of the DGP who believes in fair play, responding to Girori's conduct by first providing Ace with the Command Twin Buckle at Ziin's behest and then personally firing Girori. During the second Desire Royale, Niramu plans to quickly regain control of the DGP and move it to a different era of Earth's history before a winner is selected. However, when he begins to oppose Suel's machinations for what he did to Mitsume while trying to protect Tsumuri from becoming the Creation Goddess, Niramu is shot by Samasu from behind and ultimately entrusts Ace to undo the DGP's mistakes before dying.

Utilizing the Vision Driver, Niramu can transform into the white-colored Kamen Rider Gazer (仮面ライダーゲイザー, Kamen Raidā Geizā). While transformed, he gains the use of five Dominion Ray (ドミニオンレイ, Dominion Rei) drones, which can generate energy shields, for combat assistance.

Niramu is portrayed by Ryo Kitamura (北村 諒, Kitamura Ryō).

==== Samas ====
Samas (サマス, Samasu) is an assistant producer of the DGP. She later succeeds Niramu as the new producer by killing him and taking his Vision Driver. Due to being loyal to Suel, whom Ace properly killed, Samas is erased from existence by the latter.

Samas is portrayed by Seia Yasuda (安田 聖愛, Yasuda Seia).

==== Chirami ====
Chirami (チラミ) is Girori's replacement as the Game Master, taking over during the "Divergence" DGP until Beroba steals his Vision Driver. Though he eventually reclaims it, Chirami is killed by Michinaga during the Desire Royale.

Utilizing the Vision Driver, Chirami can transform into a red eye-themed version of Glare known as Kamen Rider Glare2 (仮面ライダーグレア2, Kamen Raidā Gurea Tsū).

Chirami is portrayed by Shigenori Yamazaki (山崎 樹範, Yamazaki Shigenori).

==== Mitsume ====
Mitsume (ミツメ) is Ace's missing mother and a former DGP navigator from a distant future. When Suel rebranded the DGP, Mitsume disagreed and attempted to resign while also secretly having a forbidden relationship with Ace's unnamed father, the previous Dezashin from a distant past before the Common Era. Mitsume gained the ability to alter reality, which also granted Ace a reincarnation ability after his first incarnation's birth. However, when the DGP found out about this retaliation and caught Ace's father, Mitsume was able to hide her son's existence from them before being caught and forcibly turned into the Creation Goddess to power the organization's wish-granting system, at the cost of the desires of eliminated DGP players through abusing her ability. Although she can temporarily regain her free will to help her son, such as by granting the means to create the Boost Mark II Buckle and reversing Suel's attempt to simply wish Ace out of existence, Mitsume ultimately sacrifices her life force to unlock her son's full potential of his birth power.

Mitsume is portrayed by Nana Isaki (井咲 奈々, Isaki Nana) and voiced by Yuka Terasaki (寺崎 裕香, Terasaki Yuka).

==== Suel ====
Suel (スエル, Sueru) is the DGP's creator and executive producer who rebranded the DGP into a reality show following the first tournament, and forcibly turned Mitsume into the Creation Goddess as well as banished her lover, Ace's father. Suel mostly observed the DGP games from the shadows until Michinaga won the JGP and a revived Ace formally declared war on the DGP. This convinces Suel to host a second Desire Royale to give the two men and the other Kamen Riders a chance to decide the fate of the DGP. But the tournament is revealed to be a distraction Suel devised to get the Kamen Riders to destroy each other while he arranges for the DGP to transfer to another period, intending to erase the world. But he is defeated by Kamen Rider Geats IX, deciding to see the world Ace intends to create while biding his time. He would later return after the defeat of his lackey Zitt to declare a final DGP. However, he cannot depower nor erase Ace from existence, and is properly killed by him.

Although a fellow user of the Vision Driver, Suel assumes the Kamen Rider forms of his deceased DGP staff, with his forms being variants from their previous users:

- Kamen Rider Gazer: (Note: According to Kodansha's article, Suel's variant of Gazer is named as Kamen Rider Suel Gazer (仮面ライダースエルゲイザー, Kamen Raidā Sueru Geizā)..) A pink eye-themed version of Gazer, which Suel accesses by utilizing Niramu's Vision Driver. Due to Suel's high authority, Gazer can access its full power through the removal of limiters imposed by the Vision Driver. After being defeated by Kamen Rider Geats IX, Suel abandons this form and returns the Vision Driver to Samasu.
- Kamen Rider Regad Omega (仮面ライダーリガドΩ, Kamen Raidā Rigado Omega): A Cyclops-themed version of Regad, which Suel accesses by utilizing the Zillion Driver and fusing himself with the cameras linked to the audience from the future who share Zitt's sense of sadism. While transformed, the cameras are fused into his armor and function as additional eyes.

Suel is portrayed by Masashi Takada (高田 将司, Takada Masashi) and voiced by Yoshitsugu Matsuoka (松岡 禎丞, Matsuoka Yoshitsugu), who also voices the Laser Raise Riser and the Vision and Zillion Driver systems.

==== Zitt ====
Zitt (ジット, Jitto) is a Game Master who supervises the bad endings to ensure all participants always lose the contest as Suel's right-hand man. He is tasked to retrieve Tsumuri for the DGP while eliminating Ace and his allies as Chirami's replacement, and attempt to deceive Keiwa into DGP's thrall. He also provided Beroba and Kekera with Black Raise Riser Cards to assume stronger, Jyamato-like forms that are not designated as Kamen Riders, giving them an edge against Michinaga by bypassing the boon from his wish while also able to overpower Riders with regular forms. While Tsumuri is in her Creation Goddess state before she escapes & reverts to normal, Zitt takes a sample from her tears to create the power of a Destruction Goddess. Despite being defeated by Geats, he let himself be absorbed by Suel.

Utilizing the Sirius Card (シリウスカード, Shiriusu Kādo) in conjunction with the Vision Driver's successor, the Zillion Driver (ジリオンドライバー, Jirion Doraibā) belt, Zitt can transform into a crimson-colored evolution of Glare and/or Gazer known as Kamen Rider Regad (仮面ライダーリガド, Kamen Raidā Rigado). While transformed, he gains the use of the twin Sovereign Ray (ソブリンレイ, Soburin Rei) drones for combat assistance.

Zitt is portrayed by Ryuji Sato (佐藤 流司, Satō Ryūji).

==== Black Tsumuri ====
Black Tsumuri (黒いツムリ, Kuroi Tsumuri) is a clone of Tsumuri that Zitt creates to make a new Destruction Goddess (破壊の女神, Hakai no Megami). Being created to be loyal to Suel, the Black Tsumuri is erased by Ace, after he killed Suel properly.

Black Tsumuri is portrayed by Kokoro Aoshima, who also portrays Tsumuri.

==== Raise Buckles ====
The Raise Buckles (レイズバックル, Reizu Bakkuru) are a series of belt buckle-like items used by the Riders in the DGP to access new powers and abilities. Using a Raise Buckle on the Desire Driver's right-hand side affects the Rider's upper body, while using one on the left-hand side affects their lower body. If two Raise Buckles are used at once for the Dual On (ヅアルオン, Duaru On) combining function, a Rider can switch both sides of the Desire Driver to the opposite side via the Revolve On (リヴォルヴオン, Rivorufu On) rotating function.

The two primary types of Raise Buckles are the plentiful small-sized Armed (アームド, Āmudo) Raise Buckles, which grant the players a corresponding Armed Weapon (アームドウエポン, Āmudo Uepon), and the rare large-sized Form (フォーム, Fōmu) Raise Buckles, which allow the players to assume armor-based forms. Unlike the Armed Raise Buckles, the Form Raise Buckles' designs have a matching center design denoting their primary halves. As these Raise Buckles are difficult to find normally, most of them can be found quickly through either Secret Missions or emergency situations. Additionally, there are the crossover-exclusive Legend Rider (レゲンドライダー, Rejendo Raidā) Raise Buckles, which allow the players to assume forms based on past Kamen Riders.

- Magnum (マグナム, Magunamu): Equips the user with the twin forearm/shin-mounted Armored Guns (アーマードガン, Āmādo Gan) and grants the use of the Magnum Shooter 40X (マグナムシューター4(フォー)0(ゼロ)X(エックス), Magunamu Shūtā Fō Zero Ekkusu; Magnum Shooter Four Zero X) firearm, which can switch between Handgun Mode (ハンドガンモード, Handogan Mōdo) and Rifle Mode (ライフルモード, Raifuru Mōdo). The user can also combine the Magnum Buckle and Magnum Shooter 40X to access the latter's Machine Gun Mode (マシンガンモード, Mashin Gan Mōdo). Its primary half is the Boost Buckle.
- Boost (ブースト, Būsuto): Grants superhuman agility and the use of the Boostriker (ブーストライカー, Būsutoraikā) motorcycle, which can be reconfigured from Bike Mode (バイクモード, Baiku Mōdo) to an Animal Mode (アニマルモード, Animaru Mōdo) based on the user's motif when they perform a Boost Time (ブーストタイム, Būsuto Taimu) finisher. However, the Boost Buckle will eject itself from the user's Desire Driver and fly away after a Boost Time is performed, making it the most difficult Raise Buckle to find. Its primary half is the Magnum Buckle.
  - Boost Mark II (ブーストマークII, Būsuto Māku Tsū): An upgraded version created by Mitsume from five copies of the Boost Buckle that grants pyrokinesis, superhuman speed, and the use of the Beast Mode (ビーストモード, Bīsuto Mōdo) ability to transform the user into a red fox-themed version of the Boostriker's Animal Mode via Revolve On. However, prolonged use of the Boost Mark II Buckle will consume the user's stamina, causing them to faint once they cancel their transformation. The Boost Mark II Buckle can be stabilized by using it alongside a Laser Raise Riser, which grants gyrokinesis in place of Beast Mode. During combat, the user can wield the Laser Raise Riser.
  - Boost Mark III (ブーストマークIII, Būsuto Māku Surī): A two-in-one upgraded version of the Boost Mark II Buckle created by Ace from his rage that grants the use of the Geats Buster QB9 (ギーツバスターQ(キュー)B(ビー)9(ナイン), Gītsu Basutā Kyū Bī Nain), which can switch between Railgun Mode (レールガンモード, Rērugan Mōdo) and Blade Mode (ブレードモード, Burēdo Mōdo). Using the Boost Mark III Buckle in its one-piece state grants the ability to materialize three energy fox tails capable of generating black holes while using it as the two-piece Boost Mark IX (ブーストマークIX, Būsuto Māku Nain) Buckle grants reality warping capabilities.
- Zombie (ゾンビ, Zonbi): Equips the user with the toxikinetic BerserClaw (バーサークロー, Bāsākurō) gauntlet/sabaton and grants the use of the chainsaw-like Zombie Breaker (ゾンビブレイカー, Zonbi Bureikā) sword. While transforming, the Zombie Buckle produces poisonous liquid that is capable of dissolving the user's enemies into nothingness.
- Ninja (ニンジャ): Grants proficiency in ninjutsu and the use of the double-bladed Ninja Dueler (ニンジャデュアラー, Ninja Duarā) sword, which can switch between its one-piece Single Blade (シングルブレード, Shinguru Burēdo) and two-piece Twin Blade (ツインブレード, Tsuin Burēdo) modes.
- Monster (モンスター, Monsutā): Equips the user with a pair of Monster Glove (モンスターグローブ, Monsutā Gurōbu) gauntlets and/or a pair of Big Boot (ビッグブーツ, Biggu Būtsu) sabatons. During the events of the crossover film Kamen Rider Geats × Revice: Movie Battle Royale, the Monster Buckle is temporarily used by Kamen Rider Vice for the Desire Royale.
- Beat (ビート, Bīto): Grants sonokinesis and the use of the cryo-electro-pyrokinetic Beat Axe (ビートアックス, Bīto Akkusu) electric guitar, which can switch between Guitar Mode (ギターモード, Gitā Mōdo) and Axe Mode (アックスモード, Akkusu Mōdo). During the events of the crossover film Kamen Rider Geats × Revice: Movie Battle Royale, the Beat Buckle is temporarily used by Kamen Rider Revi for the Desire Royale.
- Jyamato: Grants the ability to generate vines capable of strangling victims.
- Fever Slot (フィーバースロット, Fībā Surotto): A Raise Buckle which can only be activated on the Desire Driver's right-hand side that allows the user to randomly summon either the armor of an existing Form Raise Buckle or the Armed Weapon of an Armed Raise Buckle. If the summoned Form Raise Buckle matches the one on the Desire Driver's left-hand side, the user assumes an upgraded Fever Form (フィーバーフォーム, Fībā Fōmu), whose power level is increased two-fold without the use of Revolve On. Five copies of the Fever Slot Buckle were created by Girori to counter the Jyamato's increasing power.
- Command Twin (コマンドツイン, Komando Tsuin): A two-in-one Raise Buckle consisting of the orange-colored Command Jet (コマンドジェット, Komando Jetto) Buckle and the blue-colored Command Cannon (コマンドキャノン, Komando Kyanon) Buckle that grants the use of the Raising Sword (レイジングソード, Reijingu Sōdo). Using the Command Jet Buckle on its own allows the user to assume a base Raising Form (レイジングフォーム, Reijingu Fōmu) while using both Command Twin Buckles at once after charging the Command Cannon Buckle with the Raising Sword allows them to assume an armored Command Form (コマンドフォーム, Komando Fōmu), the latter of which can switch between Jet Mode (ジェットモード, Jetto Mōdo) and Cannon Mode (キャノンモード, Kyanon Mōdo) via Revolve On.
- Powered Builder (パワードビルダー, Pawādo Birudā): A right-hand side exclusive Raise Buckle that equips the user with the twin Arm Builder (アームビルダー, Āmu Birudā) manipulators on the front and back of their armor's body. It can also combine with either one of three small-sized Gigant Buckles (ギガントバックル, Giganto Bakkuru), which are stored in the Gigant Container (ギガントコンテナ, Giganto Kontena) Buckle, to grant the use of a corresponding Gigant Weapon (ギガントウエポン, Giganto Uepon) or the small-sized Magnum Shooter 40X Buckle to grant the use of the eponymous weapon. This Raise Buckle, the Gigant Container Buckle, and the Gigant Buckles first appear in the crossover film Kamen Rider Geats × Revice: Movie Battle Royale.
- Bujin Sword (ブジンソード, Bujin Sōdo): A two-in-one Raise Buckle created by Tsumuri from Keiwa's wish that grants umbrakinesis and the use of the Bujin (武刃; Warrior Sword) katana. Its right half serves as a primary base form while its left half can be replaced with other Raise Buckles.
- Fantasy (ファンタジー, Fantajī): A right-hand side exclusive Raise Buckle created by Ace from Kōsei's wish that grants intangibility and the ability to conjure magic circles and/or energy weapons based on the power level of the user's desire.

===== Legend Raise Buckles =====
- Revice Driver (リバイスドライバー, Ribaisu Doraibā): Allows Kamen Riders Revi and Vice to assume Rex Genome. This Raise Buckle first appears in the final episode of Kamen Rider Revice.
- V-Buckle (Ｖバックル, V Bakkuru): Grants the use of either Kamen Rider Ryuki's weaponry or Kamen Rider Ouja's Veno Saber. This Raise Buckle appears exclusively in the Hyper Battle DVD special Kamen Rider Geats: How Is It!? Desire Grand Prix Filled With Men, I Am Ouja!!.
- Shinobi (シノビ): Grants the use of Kamen Rider Shinobi's abilities and weaponry. This Raise Buckle appears exclusively in the web special Geats Extra: Kamen Rider Tycoon Meets Kamen Rider Shinobi.

===== Other Raise Buckles =====
- X Geats (X(クロス)ギーツ, Kurosu Gītsu; Cross Geats): A dark copy of the Boost Mark III Buckle that grants the use of dark copies of the Geats Buster QB9 and Raising Sword called the Geats Buster X (ギーツバスターX(クロス), Gītsu Basutā Kurosu; Geats Buster Cross) and X Raising Sword (X(クロス)レイジングソード, Kurosu Reijingu Sōdo; Cross Raising Sword) respectively. This Raise Buckle appears exclusively in the film Kamen Rider Geats the Movie: Four Aces and the Black Fox.
- Oneness (ワンネス, Wan'nesu): A right-hand side exclusive Raise Buckle that when used in conjunction with the Kamen Rider Geats (Oneness Ver.) Ride Chemy Card grants the combined powers of Kamen Riders Geats, Tycoon, Na-Go, Buffa, PunkJack, Keilow, and Lopo. This Raise Buckle appears exclusively in the film Kamen Rider Geats the Movie: Four Aces and the Black Fox.
- Dooms Geats (ドゥームズギーツ, Dūmuzu Gītsu): An evolved form of the Boost Mark III Buckle that grants the use of an enhanced version of the Geats Buster QB9. This Raise Buckle appears exclusively in the V-Cinema Kamen Rider Geats: Jyamato Awaking.
- Plosion Rage (プロージョンレイジ, Purōjon Reiji): A two-in-one Raise Buckle that equips the user with a left forearm-mounted claw/shield hybrid. This Raise Buckle appears exclusively in the V-Cinema Kamen Rider Geats: Jyamato Awaking.

=== Sara Sakurai ===
Sara Sakurai (桜井 沙羅, Sakurai Sara) is Keiwa's older sister and a fan of Neon Kurama, and later Ace Ukiyo, who cares for Keiwa after their parents were killed in the crossfire of a previous DGP and were not revived in subsequent resets.

During the "Longing" DGP, Kekera convinces Sara to volunteer for the Desire Royale, during which she utilizes a Desire Driver to become the masked palm civet-themed Kamen Rider Hakubi (仮面ライダーハクビ, Kamen Raidā Hakubi). While transformed, she wears the Hakubi Purity (ハクビピュリティ, Hakubi Pyuriti) faceplate, which grants an increased sixth sense.

During the "Creation" DGP, Sara initially planned to live with Neon to help her adjust her own life and so Keiwa can live at their former home. However, Kekera and Beroba have Daichi secretly infect Sara with amounts of parasite Jyamato, and set up her presumed death as a catalyst to drive both Michinaga and Keiwa apart when the former accidentally, seemingly murders her to his horror. In truth, Sara is transported and entrapped alongside other victims of Stage 2 parasite Jyamato inside the Tree of Knowledge (知恵の樹, Chie no Ki). While revived alongside their parents through Tsumuri granting Keiwa's wish to revive everyone killed in the DGP, she and her parents end up being killed again by Kamen Rider Tarbon. However, she is the first to be revived thanks to a serum created by Daichi. With the DGP erased at cost of losing the memory of Ace's existence, Sara made her multiple wishes on her own.

Sara Sakurai is portrayed by Nene Shida (志田 音々, Shida Nene).

=== Kurama family ===
The Kurama family is an affluent family that runs a major conglomerate in Japan, which has sponsored the DGP, protected civilians, and kept the Jyamato's existence a secret from the world for generations until the "Longing" DGP. ended

- Irumi Kurama (鞍馬 伊瑠美, Kurama Irumi): Neon's overprotective, controlling, and disapproving mother and co-CEO of a major conglomerate who fears for her daughter's safety and that of the family fortune after her biological daughter, Akari, was kidnapped and murdered as a child. Irumi, believing Neon is Akari, took several precautions to prevent the a repeat of the incident, including hiring foreign bodyguards and implanting a GPS tracker in Neon. Later, Irumi apologizes to her adopted daughter for pushing her away too far, and ultimately reconciles with her, following Kōsei's arrest during the "Creation" DGP. Irumi Kurama is portrayed by Ryoko Yuui (遊井 亮子, Yūi Ryōko).
- Kōsei Kurama (鞍馬 光聖, Kurama Kōsei): Neon's father and co-CEO of a major conglomerate who received a wish, which he used to bring Neon into existence to replace his deceased biological daughter Akari, in exchange for sponsoring the DGP. In the present, he allows her to participate in the DGP for his own reasons, placing him at odds with Irumi over Neon's well-being. But when Ace uses his powers to make the DGP public knowledge during the "Creation" DGP, Kōsei is temporarily arrested on charges of bribery and conspiracy during the first-half, until Neon helps him escape during the second-half, restoring his fighting spirit to protect his family, and gains a Desire Driver and the Fantasy Buckle from Ace to transform into the wildcat-themed Kamen Rider Gya-Go (仮面ライダーギャーゴ, Kamen Raidā Gyāgo). After getting his revenge on his daughter's murderer, Kōsei found inner peace and entrusts both his Rider qualification entry and the Fantasy Buckle to Neon. Kōsei Kurama is portrayed by Shinji Kasahara (笠原 紳司, Kasahara Shinji).
- Ben (ベン) and John (ジョン, Jon): Two foreign bodyguards that Irumi hired to protect Neon and participants of a previous DGP, with Ben competing as the black panther-themed Kamen Rider Lancer (仮面ライダーランサー, Kamen Raidā Ransā) and John as the white tiger-themed Kamen Rider Garun (仮面ライダーガルン, Kamen Raidā Garun), before they were eliminated from the tournament by Kamen Rider Buffa. Ben and John are portrayed by Michael Kinder and Tom Constantine (トム・コンスタンタイン, Tomu Konsutantain) respectively. (Note: Michael Kinder is credited as "Michal K." (マイケル・K, Maikeru Kē) in the opening credits.)

=== Archimedel ===
Archimedel (アルキメデル, Arukimederu) is a mysterious gardener and associate of the DGP who oversees the Jyamar Garden (ジャマーガーデン, Jamā Gāden) and the Jyamato's growth, believing they are superior to humans. During the "Lamentation" DGP, he revives an ancient Dunkleosteus Jyamato to assist in the JGP. After the monster is mortally injured by Kamen Riders Na-Go and Kyuun, he allows the Dunkleosteus Jyamato to devour him so the monster can fully heal, with the Jyamato adopting Archimedel's form and personality as a result.

The Dunkleosteus Jyamato, acting out on Archimedel's ideology, would make his presence known in the Desire Royale when he grabs Daichi's ID Core before Michinaga could destroy it. The Dunkleosteus Jyamato is then recruited by Beroba and Kekera to attack Sara as part of the latter's plan to force Keiwa to actively participate. But the Jyamato is destroyed by Ace and Michinaga, with Archimedel ceasing to exist. However, his work is continued by Daichi in the "Creation" DGP.

Archimedel is portrayed by Shihou Harumi (春海 四方, Harumi Shihō).

=== Daichi Isuzu ===
Daichi Isuzu (五十鈴 大智, Isuzu Daichi) is a quiz king and veteran DGP Rider who participates in the "Divergence" DGP to fulfill his wish of acquiring all of mankind's collective memories while secretly working for Beroba. After turning the other players against Keiwa by accusing him of being the Dezastar, Daichi is voted off, but returns later in the tournament to aid Beroba. Due to being unable to participate in the JGP, he joins the Desire Royale. However, Daichi's plan to use Neon and Sara as sacrificial pieces to win a round backfires when Michinaga overpowers and eliminates him. But the Dunkleosteus Jyamato "Archimedel" grabs Daichi's ID Core before Michinaga could destroy it.

After the Desire Royale ended and Ace recreated the world, Daichi acquires Archimedel's research data and uses it to turn himself into the Marrella Jyamato (マーレラジャマト, Mārera Jamato) before creating more dangerous Jyamato variants as part of his plan to become a Jamashin and create a cult. However, in retaliation for infecting Sara with a Stage 2 parasite Jyamato where Michinaga accidentally murders her by mistake, Daichi suffers a near-death experience and was about to be killed by a fallen Keiwa, until a worried Ace prevents his fallen friend from going too far and sends Daichi to the hospital under his custody. Ultimately, as atonement to make up for his mistake on Ace's behalf, Daichi mass-produces a serum to revive and free innocent casualties from the previous events, starting with Sara, from the Tree of Knowledge to return Keiwa to the side of good. With the DGP erased at the cost of losing the memory of Ace's existence, Daichi fulfilled his wish to make humanity co-exist with the Jyamato peacefully.

Daichi initially utilizes his Desire Driver to transform into the sparrow-themed Kamen Rider Nadge-Sparrow (仮面ライダーナッジスパロウ, Kamen Raidā Najji Suparō). Like PunkJack, his primary Form Raise Buckle is Monster, which allows him to assume Monster Form.

Daichi Isuzu is portrayed by Dai Goto (後藤 大, Gotō Dai).

=== Ziin ===
Ziin (ジーン, Jīn) is a DGP viewer who became Ace's Supporter for the thrill to find meaning in his existence, intervening at times to keep his main source of entertainment going. But after learning Ace's past and having a near-death experience, Ziin realizes the value of life as he gives Ace his Laser Raise Riser and becomes his ally in investigating the DGP. Alongside Kyuun and Tsumuri, Ziin is spared from being erased by Ace, when he erased the DGP from existence. This allows Ziin to reform the DGP under his direction in peaceful ways.

Utilizing the Laser Raise Riser, Ziin can transform into the silver fox-themed Kamen Rider Ziin (仮面ライダージーン, Kamen Raidā Jīn). While transformed, he gains gyrokinesis.

During the events of the web series Kamen Rider Outsiders, Ziin acquires the Laser Raise Driver (レーザーレイズドライバー, Rēzā Reizu Doraibā) belt, which allows him to transform into his silver fox/eyeball-themed final form; Kamen Rider Ziin Gazer (仮面ライダージーンゲイザー, Kamen Raidā Jīn Geizā).

Ziin is portrayed by Fuku Suzuki (鈴木 福, Suzuki Fuku).

=== Kekera ===
Kekera (ケケラ) is a mysterious middle-aged DGP viewer who is Keiwa's Supporter, able to assume a frog-like form. Being obsessed with displaying Keiwa as an ideal hero, Kekera commits unsavory acts to have Keiwa revived and force him to participate in the Desire Royale by tricking Sara into joining the game. Kekera's obsession led him to wish to the Creation Goddess to remain in the present era to continue to deceive Keiwa, until Keiwa finally learns the truth and fights him. Nevertheless, despite the fight ending up in a draw, Keiwa still thanks Kekera for what he did for him back in the "Divergence" and "Lamentation" DGP before he dies.

Utilizing the Laser Raise Riser, Kekera can transform into the frog/mecha-themed Kamen Rider Kekera (仮面ライダーケケラ, Kamen Raidā Kekera). While transformed, he gains the ability to produce a tongue-like energy whip. He later transforms into the water lily-themed Premium Kekera (プレミアムケケラ, Puremiamu Kekera) via the Black Raise Riser Card provided by Zitt.

Kekera is portrayed by Mitsutoshi Shundo (俊藤 光利, Shundō Mitsutoshi).

=== Beroba ===
Beroba (ベロバ) is a sadistic girl who is older than she appears and is the Jyamato's sponsor, talking Michinaga and Daichi into helping her hijack the DGP and gain access to the Creation Goddess Mitsume. She manages to get partial access from stealing Chirami's Vision Driver and establishes the Jyamato Grand Prix to seize the Vision Driver in Niramu's possession to fully use Mistume's power. Near the end of the Desire Royale, she had Mitsume grant her wish to remain in the present era to continue observing events to satisfy her bloodlust, until Michinaga kills her and ends the atrocities she created. During the events of the V-Cinema Kamen Rider Geats: Jyamato Awaking, a revived Beroba was assigned by Niramu from her timeline to relay his message to the three remaining Riders to avert the bad future that resulted from God Jyamato's reign of terror. Beroba attempts to turn Michinaga into a Jyamato through his dormant Jamashin powers, but the addition of Ace's power of creation turns it into the Plosion Rage Buckle to be used for Buffa's enhanced form.

Utilizing the Laser Raise Riser, Beroba can transform into the bull/mecha-themed Kamen Rider Beroba (仮面ライダーベロバ, Kamen Raidā Beroba). While transformed, she gains levitation capabilities. She can also transform into Kamen Rider Glare2 utilizing the Vision Driver she stole and the fingerprint she copied from Chirami. She later transforms into the flower-themed Premium Beroba (プレミアムベロバ, Puremiamu Beroba) via the Black Raise Riser Card provided by Zitt.

Beroba is portrayed by Ayaka Namiki (並木 彩華, Namiki Ayaka).

=== Kyuun ===
Kyuun (キューン, Kyūn) is a mysterious DGP viewer and Neon's supporter who was chosen by Kōsei to become her fiancé and help her find peace to honor Akari's memory. Alongside Ziin and Tsumuri, Kyuun is spared from being erased by Ace, when he erased the DGP from existence. Kyuun is then offered to become a producer for Neon's streaming shows, which he happily accepts.

Utilizing the Laser Raise Riser, Kyuun can transform into the winged lion/mecha-themed Kamen Rider Kyuun (仮面ライダーキューン, Kamen Raidā Kyūn). While transformed, he gains flight capabilities and the ability to fire energy beams.

Kyuun is portrayed by Kenta Mizue (水江 建太, Mizue Kenta).

=== Jyamato ===
The Jyamato (ジャマト, Jamato) are plant-based monsters based in a greenhouse within the mysterious Jyamar Garden and appear in the Jyamar Area (ジャマーエリア, Jamā Eria), where they are cultivated and fed broken ID Cores by Archimedel after they spawn. Initially containing the memories and embodying the desires of fallen DGP players, the Jyamato gradually evolve into stronger variants with the ability to mimic the fallen players' forms. Additionally, if the DGP players lose against the Jyamato, the Jyamar Area will become an extension of the Jyamar Garden. The Jyamato were originally created by the future people using mutant plants that they took from a ruined Earth.

Among the Jyamato sub-species are the Bishop Jyamato (ビショップジャマト, Bishoppu Jamato), the Knight Jyamato (ナイトジャマト, Naito Jamato), the Rook Jyamato (ルークジャマト, Rūku Jamato), the Pawn Jyamato (ポーンジャマト, Pōn Jamato) foot soldiers, the sea slug-like giant Slug Fortress Jyamato (スラグフォートレスジャマト, Suragu Fōtoresu Jamato), the Rafflesia-like giant Rafflesia Fortress Jyamato (ラフレシアフォートレスジャマト, Rafureshia Fōtoresu Jamato), and the Dunkleosteus Jyamato (ダンクルオステウスジャマト, Dankuruosuteusu Jamato).

During the "Conspiracy" DGP, the Pawn Jyamato become stronger, with the added benefit of some utilizing a Jyamato Buckle in conjunction with a Desire Driver to transform into a Kamen Rider-esque Jyamato Rider (ジャマトライダー, Jamato Raidā). If a Jyamato Rider is defeated, another will take its place. Furthermore, if a DGP player uses it for an extended period of time, the Jyamato Buckle will gradually turn them into a Jyamato.

After Ace awakened his power, he recreated the world with one of his rules stating that Jyamato should not exist though leftovers have remained even from past Grand Ends with said survivors being written off as folklore monsters; this time, Daichi bypasses that by hybridizing humans and Jyamato, turning himself into one while creating parasitic miniature Pawn Jyamato that can turn human hosts into Jyamato. While the Stage 1 parasite Jyamato can be safely removed from the host's body, Daichi makes a stranger batch while removing that design flaw. If the victims who were infected with Stage 2 parasite Jyamato were presumably killed, their bodies are transported and entrapped inside the Tree of Knowledge where Daichi could use their knowledge to fulfill his desire. After Daichi reforms to atone for his crime for being a pawn for the DGP and both Kekera and Beroba, he mass-produces a serum to revive those who were infected by the Stage 2 parasite Jyamato that can still be saved. As part of his atonement, ahead of Suel's final plan, Daichi transforms Jyamato into humanity's supporters.

- Castle Jyamato (城ジャマト, Shiro Jamato): A Japanese castle-themed Slug Fortress Jyamato. It is destroyed by Kamen Rider Geats.
- Japanese Dress Jyamato (和装ジャマト, Wasō Jamato): Japanese clothing-themed Pawn Jyamato.
- Bandit Jyamato (盗賊ジャマト, Tōzoku Jamato): Thief-themed Pawn Jyamato. It is destroyed by Kamen Rider Geats.
- Leader Jyamato (頭領ジャマト, Tōryō Jamato): A thief-themed Rook Jyamato.
- Zombie Jyamato (ゾンビジャマト, Zonbi Jamato): Zombie-themed Pawn Jyamato that infect their victims with a zombie virus by biting them, ignoring those they have already infected.
- Playing Card Jyamato (トランプジャマト, Toranpu Jamato): Playing card-themed Pawn Jyamato that appear in pairs, which require two Kamen Riders to attack both Jyamato at the same time to prevent them from reviving each other.
- Dummy Jyamato (仮想ジャマト, Kasō Jamato): Training dummy-themed Pawn Jyamato summoned through a Spider Phone for training purposes.
- Cactus Knight Jyamato (サボテンナイトジャマト, Saboten Naito Jamato): Cactus-themed Knight Jyamato that is among the most dangerous Jyamato sub-species due to their potential for killing multiple Riders at once and ability to enlarge themselves. One serves as the final boss of the "Encounter" DGP while a second impersonates Tōru Imai during the "Lamentation" DGP before both are destroyed by Kamen Rider Geats. The second Cactus Knight Jyamato's human form is portrayed by Tasuku Maekawa, who also portrays the real Tōru Imai.
- Mafia Jyamato: Mafia-themed Pawn Jyamato that killed Keiwa and Sara Sakurai's parents in the crossfire of a previous DGP.
- Pirate Jyamato (海賊ジャマト, Kaizoku Jamato): Pirate-themed Pawn Jyamato that quickly eliminated most of the participants at an alarming rate during the first round of the "Conspiracy" DGP.
- Butler Jyamato (執事ジャマト, Shitsuji Jamato): Butler-themed Pawn Jyamato, one of which being the first Jyamato Rider that the Kamen Riders encounter.
- Maid Jyamato (メイドジャマト, Meido Jamato): Maid-themed Pawn Jyamato and female counterparts to the Butler Jyamato, with one able to assume a Jyamato Rider form.
- Hide-and-Seek Jyamato (かくれんぼジャマト, Kakurenbo Jamato): A hide-and-seek-themed Bishop Jyamato capable of disguising itself as a little human girl and produce hallucinogenic gas that serves as a boss in the "Conspiracy" DGP's third round. It is destroyed by Kamen Rider Tycoon. Its human guise is portrayed by Anna Sahara (佐原 杏奈, Sahara An'na).
- Western Castle Jyamato (洋城ジャマト, Yōjō Jamato): A Western castle-themed Rafflesia Fortress Jyamato. It is destroyed by Kamen Rider Geats.
- Delinquent Jyamato (不良ジャマト, Furyō Jamato): Delinquent-themed Pawn Jyamato.
- Study Jyamato (勉強ジャマト, Benkyō Jamato): A student-themed Pawn Jyamato. It is destroyed by Kamen Rider Geats.
- Principal Jyamato (校長ジャマト, Kōchō Jamato): A principal-themed Pawn Jyamato that serves as a boss in the first round of the "Divergence" DGP. It is destroyed by Kamen Rider Geats.
- Delivery Jyamato (配達ジャマト, Haitatsu Jamato): Courier-themed Pawn Jyamato.
- Bomber Jyamato (爆弾魔ジャマト, Bakudanma Jamato): A bomber-themed Bishop Jyamato capable of making bombs disguised as fruit. It is destroyed by Kamen Rider Lopo.
- Ninja Jyamato (忍者ジャマト, Ninja Jamato): Ninja-themed Pawn Jamato.
- Matador Jyamato (マタドールジャマト, Matadōru Jamato): A bullfighter-themed Pawn Jyamato.
- Angel Jyamato (天使ジャマト, Tenshi Jamato): Angel-themed Pawn Jyamato.
- Helianthus Annuus Jyamato (ヘリアンサス・アナスジャマト, Heriansasu Anasu Jamato): A sunflower-themed Pawn Jyamato. Under commands of a redeemed new leader, Daichi Isuzu, they are created to protect and save humanity from the DGP's extinction level final season, such as preventing the forced participants from killing each other and combat one of Suel's loyalists.

==== "Takeshi Goutokuji" Jyamato ====
An unnamed Rook Jyamato that was created during the "Conspiracy" DGP and served as a mini-boss in the tournament's initial final round. After surviving being destroyed, it begins to mimic the appearance of fallen DGP player Takeshi Goutokuji in the "Divergence" DGP, becoming a recurring boss in the process.

The unnamed Rook Jyamato's human form is portrayed by Yamato Kinjo, who also portrays the real Takeshi Goutokuji.

==== Other Jyamato ====
- Opabinia Jyamato (オパビニアジャマト, Opabinia Jamato): A Jyamato sub-species that appears exclusively in the film Kamen Rider Geats the Movie: Four Aces and the Black Fox.
- Clover Jyamato: A four-leaf clover-themed Pawn Jyamato that has an evil ambition to turn all humanity into Jyamato and appears exclusively in the stage show Kamen Rider Geats: Final Stage. It utilizes the Vision Driver containing Ace's power of creation to transform into a Jyamato-themed version of Gazer known as Kamen Rider Jyamato Gazer (仮面ライダージャマトゲイザー, Kamen Raidā Jamato Geizā). It is destroyed by Kamen Rider Geats. The Pawn Jyamato is voiced by Kenta Miyake (三宅 健太, Miyake Kenta).
- Queen Jyamato (クイーンジャマト, Kuīn Jamato): A Jyamato sub-species that appears exclusively in the V-Cinema Kamen Rider Geats: Jyamato Awaking. A Queen Jyamato who was created by Daichi as an experiment for Jyamato and mankind to coexist, learning the concept of human compassion. She assumes the human identity Hazuki (葉月) and becomes pregnant by her human partner, Kiyoharu Usagami, but the King Jyamato kills Kiyoharu to incite distrust among humans to Hazuki and her son. She is killed by the King Jyamato after discovering his deception too late, which enrages Keiwa and the others. Hazuki is portrayed by Arisa Matsunaga (松永 有紗, Matsunaga Arisa).
- King Jyamato (キングジャマト, Kingu Jamato): A Jyamato sub-species that appears exclusively in the V-Cinema Kamen Rider Geats: Jyamato Awaking, who assumes the human identity Aoto (蒼斗). He is originally one of the two Jyamato created by Daichi to encourage coexistence between humankind and their species, but the King Jyamato went rogue and deceived Queen Jyamato into thinking that Daichi's advocations for peaceful coexistence were in vain. When his deception gets exposed by Keiwa and Neon, King Jyamato murders the Queen and manages to overpower the two Riders until Buffa joins the fray and turns the tide of the battle. He is destroyed by Kamen Riders Tycoon, Na-Go, and Buffa. Aoto is portrayed by Keigo Hagiya (萩谷 慧悟, Hagiya Keigo).
- God Jyamato (ゴッドジャマト, Goddo Jamato): A Jyamato sub-species that appears exclusively in the V-Cinema Kamen Rider Geats: Jyamato Awaking. It is a human-Jyamato hybrid named Haruki (春樹) born to Kiyoharu and Hazuki, who was originally meant to destroy mankind as a result of Aoto's machinations. He was also targeted by the future Ace to avert the impending bad future, only for both forces to be defused by the present day Geats and Buffa. Convinced by Michinaga to live his own life in happiness, Haruki returns to living as a human under Daichi's care. Haruki is portrayed by Minato Shogaki (正垣 湊都, Shōgaki Minato).

== Guest characters ==
- Fukuo Fukuoka (福岡 福男, Fukuoka Fukuo): A chef and owner of a soba restaurant that the Sakurai siblings frequent and Keiwa eventually gets a job at. Fukuo Fukuoka is portrayed Mr. Chin (ミスターちん, Misutā Chin).
- Takeshi Goutokuji (豪徳寺 武, Gōtokuji Takeshi): A firefighter chosen to participate in the DGP as the polar bear-themed Kamen Rider Shirowe (仮面ライダーシロー, Kamen Raidā Shirō) and one of the three finalists of the "Daybreak" DGP who is killed by the Slug Fortress Jyamato. Takeshi Goutokuji is portrayed by Yamato Kinjo (金城 大和, Kinjō Yamato), who also portrays the Rook Jyamato who assumed his form.
- Takahito Taira (平 孝人, Taira Takahito): The director of human resources of an IT company that Keiwa interviewed for while job searching who joins the "Encounter" DGP as the crested penguin-themed Kamen Rider Ginpen (仮面ライダーギンペン, Kamen Raidā Ginpen) to achieve his desire of saving his sickly son. Although Keiwa's desire for world peace did not fit his company, Taira finds joy in this. Taira later crosses paths with Keiwa during the first round before he is fatally wounded fighting a Jyamato, dying with regret in Keiwa's arms, though Ace grants Taira's wish. Takahito Taira is portrayed by Tomoharu Hasegawa (長谷川 朝晴, Hasegawa Tomoharu).
- Kanato Sumida (墨田 奏斗, Sumida Kanato): A high school student and former aspiring basketball player who suffered a leg injury in a traffic accident and was forced to quit his dream. Ever since, he became a manipulative misanthropist who keeps to himself and developed a desire for "a world where humanity suffers misfortunes which leads to their extinction". He participates in the "Encounter" DGP as the panda-themed Kamen Rider Da·Paan (仮面ライダーダパーン, Kamen Raidā Dapān). During the second round of the tournament, an unaware Kanato is infected by a Zombie Jyamato, but uses his zombie status to justify freely attacking the other Kamen Riders, specifically Neon. After losing points for attacking Morio and being attacked by the other Riders due to his zombie status, Kanato is disqualified for putting his obsession to eliminate his competition over saving civilians and is replaced with Kamen Rider PunkJack. Following Keiwa's downfall in the first round of the "Creation" DGP, Kanato returns in its second round thanks to Beroba. Kanato Sumida is portrayed by Ryunosuke Miyamoto (宮本 龍之介, Miyamoto Ryūnosuke).
- Morio Koganeya (小金屋 森魚, Koganeya Morio): A shady and dishonest playboy and former casino dealer whose tactics often get him in trouble. Putting on a friendly facade, he joins the "Encounter" DGP as the bighorn sheep-themed Kamen Rider Mary (仮面ライダーメリー, Kamen Raidā Merī) to exploit or bend its rules, such as saving civilians he secretly arranged to be attacked by Jyamato. During the teamwork round, he attempts to abandon his assigned partner, Kamen Rider PunkJack, in exchange for Michinaga, only to be eliminated after the latter abandons him for Keiwa at the last minute. Morio Koganeya is portrayed by Koji Abe (あべ こうじ, Abe Kōji).
- Tōru Imai (今井 透, Imai Tōru): A construction worker, former high school delinquent, and Michinaga's best friend who participated in a previous DGP tournament as the hedgehog-themed Kamen Rider Togetchi (仮面ライダートゲッチ, Kamen Raidā Togetchi) to build a landmark in his hometown and previously used the Zombie Buckle before he was assaulted by two unnamed Kamen Riders and killed by a Jyamato horde before Michinaga or Ace could rescue him. Ever since, the former took up the Zombie Buckle to honor and avenge him in subsequent tournaments. Tōru Imai is portrayed by Tasuku Maekawa (前川 佑, Maekawa Tasuku), who also portrays a Cactus Knight Jyamato who assumed his form.
- Yukie Yaginuma (八木沼 雪絵, Yaginuma Yukie): A goth girl who participates in the "Conspiracy" DGP as the goat-themed Kamen Rider Letter (仮面ライダーレター, Kamen Raidā Retā) to fulfill her wish of losing weight and marrying an idol she admires. However, due to her lack of combat experience, she is killed by a horde of Pirate Jyamato while attempting to flee. Yukie Yaginuma is portrayed by Michi Ota (大田 路, Ōta Michi).
- Ittetsu Tanba (丹波 一徹, Tanba Ittetsu): An elderly man who participates in the "Conspiracy" DGP as the great horned owl-themed Kamen Rider Keilow (仮面ライダーケイロウ, Kamen Raidā Keirō) to fulfill his wish of becoming younger. Due to his age and condition however, he voluntarily gives up his place in the tournament to Keiwa. Ittetsu later returns to volunteer in the DGP one more time during the events of the film Kamen Rider Geats the Movie: Four Aces and the Black Fox. Ittetsu Tanba is portrayed by Hideki Kurauchi (藏内 秀樹, Kurauchi Hideki).
- Kamen Rider Chuta (仮面ライダーチュータ, Kamen Raidā Chūta) and Kamen Rider Gessy (仮面ライダーゲッシー, Kamen Raidā Gesshī): A respective pair of rat and beaver-themed Kamen Riders transformed from unseen DGP staff members, who are often turned into GM Riders under Girori and Chirami's commands.
- Sae Ganaha (我那覇 冴, Ganaha Sae): An athlete and veteran DGP Rider who participates in the "Divergence" DGP as the wolf-themed Kamen Rider Lopo (仮面ライダーロポ, Kamen Raidā Ropo) to fulfill her wish of having a body that does not decline over time and supporting her family due to her father dying sometime prior. While she is initially thought to be the tournament's Dezastar who was secretly ordered to sabotage, later kill, her competitors, she discovers Neon Kurama is the true Dezastar, but allows herself to be scapegoated in light of her friendship with her. This, coupled with her family temporarily being taken hostage by the Jyamato before Neon rescues them leads to Sae voluntarily eliminating herself from the tournament to focus on supporting her family. Sae later returns to volunteer in the DGP one more time during the events of the film Kamen Rider Geats the Movie: Four Aces and the Black Fox. Sae Ganaha is portrayed by Rina Onuki (小貫 莉奈, Onuki Rina).
- Kazunori Nagayama (永山 一徳, Nagayama Kazunori): A man who participates in the "Longing" DGP as the beagle-themed Kamen Rider Groovy (仮面ライダーグルービー, Kamen Raidā Gurūbī) before he is eliminated by Kamen Rider Buffa. Kazunori Nagayama is portrayed by Eitoku (永徳).
- Kirito Asari (浅利 切人, Asari Kirito): A villainous gang leader who was a participant in a past DGP tournament as the wild boar-themed Kamen Rider Turbon (仮面ライダーターボン, Kamen Raidā Tābon). He was resurrected in the second round of the "Creation" DGP, until Keiwa defeated him and took over his gang as a crime lord in retaliation for murdering his family. Kirito Asari is portrayed by Satoshi Uekiya (うえきや サトシ, Uekiya Satoshi).
- Kazuo Numabukuro (沼袋 一男, Numabukuro Kazuo): A criminal with a dark history for attempted ransom on the Kurama Group through blackmailing, and both kidnapping and murdering their heir. He killed Akari in the original timeline, until a deal between Kōsei and the DGP undid Numabukuro's attempted crimes in an altered timeline where Neon came into being as Akari's replacement instead of the latter being revived. In the present, he participates in the second round of the "Creation" DGP as the bat-themed Kamen Rider Brali (仮面ライダーブラーリ, Kamen Raidā Burāri), until Kōsei defeats him as Kamen Rider Gya-Go and avenges Akari's death. Kazuo Numabukuro is portrayed by Hiroyuki Seki (関 ヒロユキ, Seki Hiroyuki).
- The End Riders (ジエンドライダー, Ji Endo Raidā): A group of civilians who are unwillingly transformed into Kamen Riders under Black Tsumuri as part of Suel's Bad Ending Game (バッドエンドゲーム, Baddo Endo Gēmu), wherein players are forced to fight against one another to survive or self destruct if they were to forfeit their participation from the game.
- Houtaro Ichinose (一ノ瀬 宝太郎, Ichinose Hōtarō): A second-year high school student who can transform into Kamen Rider Gotchard (仮面ライダーガッチャード, Kamen Raidā Gatchādo). He and his flying Hopper1 Ride Chemy Card unknowingly pass by Ace's spirit while Houtaro is late for school. Houtaro Ichinose is portrayed by Junsei Motojima (本島 純政, Motojima Junsei), ahead of his appearance in Kamen Rider Gotchard.

== Spin-off characters ==
=== Kaima Todoroki ===
Kaima Todoroki (轟 戒真, Todoroki Kaima) is a former professional boxer who left due to assault accusations and works for Colus and appears exclusively in the film Kamen Rider Geats × Revice: Movie Battle Royale. While participating in the Desire Royale to fulfill his father's wish for him to be successful like his older siblings, Kaima attained a similar winning streak as Ace until the tournament is erased from existence. After becoming a target in the DGP, he is defeated by Kamen Riders Geats, Revi, and Vice, eliminating him from the tournament. Nevertheless, Ikki Igarashi convinces Kaima to be his own man without his father's influence.

Utilizing the Desire Driver, Kaima can transform into the deer-themed Kamen Rider Seeker (仮面ライダーシーカー, Kamen Raidā Shīkā). His primary Form Raise Buckle is Powered Builder, which allows him to assume Powered Builder Form (パワードビルダーフォーム, Pawādo Birudā Fōmu).

Kaima Todoroki is portrayed by Yusuke Onuki (大貫 勇輔, Ōnuki Yūsuke).

=== Colus ===
Colus (コラス, Korasu) is the Game Master of the Desire Royale (デザイアロワイヤル, Dezaia Rowaiyaru), a group that functions similarly to the DGP, and the DGP's original Game Master who appears exclusively in the film Kamen Rider Geats × Revice: Movie Battle Royale. He conspires with Eiichi Todoroki and aliens Baridero and Izangi to create the Gate of Ruin (破滅の門, Hametsu no Mon) and summon an army of aliens to fulfill his wish of having aliens and humans fight each other for survival. Additionally, he manipulates Kamen Riders Knight, Ouja, and Ryuga into serving him and assisting his son Kaima. However, Colus is killed during a duel against Girori, who alters the Desire Royale's final round so the Riders can defeat Kaima and thwart Colus' plans.

Colus is portrayed by Tetsuhiro Ikeda (池田 鉄洋, Ikeda Tetsuhiro).

=== Eiichi Todoroki ===
Eiichi Todoroki (轟 栄一, Todoroki Eiichi) is Kaima Todoroki's corrupt politician father, who views his son as a pawn to further his political power and appears exclusively in the film Kamen Rider Geats × Revice: Movie Battle Royale. He forces his youngest son, Kaima, to participate in the Desire Royale to fulfill his wish of becoming a dictator on his behalf, only to be arrested on bribery charges due to Ace winning the Desire Royale.

Eiichi Todoroki is portrayed by Hajime Yamazaki (山崎 一, Yamazaki Hajime).

=== Hiroki Amamiya ===
Hiroki Amamiya (雨宮 ヒロキ, Amamiya Hiroki) is a fellow member of Win Hareruya's punk rock band, Weather Hearts, and a father who appears exclusively in the web special Geats Extra: Kamen Rider PunkJack. Following Weather Hearts' disbandment, Hiroki initially joined the previous DGP to reform the rock band and reunite with its members including Win. Unfortunately, upon learning how dangerous the DGP is, he gives up his desire after Win, now a staff agent of DGP saved his life, so he can focus to support his wife and recently born son. Sometimes after Ace became a god and undid DGP's damages, Hiroki's wish to reunite his band has finally been fulfilled without any compromises.

Utilizing the Desire Driver, Hiroki can transform into the Dalmatian-themed Kamen Rider Bucchii (仮面ライダーブッチー, Kamen Raidā Butchī).

Hiroki Amamiya is portrayed by Kaname Futaba (二葉 要, Futaba Kaname).

=== Kazuki Majima ===
Kazuki Majima (真島 一樹, Majima Kazuki) is the captain of the DGP guard with an evil ambition to take over the world who appears exclusively in the web special Geats Extra: Kamen Rider PunkJack. Unfortunately, his attempted coup on Girori failed, who then transformed him into a GM Rider and had him be destroyed by Win.

Kazuki Majima is portrayed by Kento Ono (小野 健斗, Ono Kento).

=== Amakusa Shirō ===
Amakusa Shirō Tokisada (天草 四郎 時貞) is the leader of evil ninja faction Niji no Hebi (虹蛇) in the world of Kamen Rider Shinobi who can transform into his monster form Geronimo (ジェロニモ, Jeronimo) and appears exclusively in the web special Geats Extra: Kamen Rider Tycoon Meets Kamen Rider Shinobi.

Amakusa Shirō Tokisada is portrayed by Shohei Hashimoto (橋本 祥平, Hashimoto Shōhei).

=== Mela ===
Mela (メラ, Mera) is one of two wanted criminals from the future referred to as the god killers (神殺し, Kamigoroshi), having earned such reputation for killing deities in recorded history to steal their powers for his own. As revealed in the Who Is Melo? side novel, Mela had defeated Susanoo and Loki prior to serving as a major antagonist of the film Kamen Rider Geats the Movie: Four Aces and the Black Fox. He is ultimately defeated by Kamen Rider Geats and forcibly returned to the future with Melo.

Utilizing the Desire Driver, Mela can transform into the cross fox-themed Kamen Rider X Geats (仮面ライダーX(クロス)ギーツ, Kamen Raidā Kurosu Gītsu). His primary Form Raise Buckle is X Geats, which he created by absorbing a huge portion of Ace's traits and therefore his power of creation. During Mela's brief appearance in the "Creation" DGP, he previously took on Kamen Rider X Geats' appearance prior to its creation via Loki's shapeshifting.

Mela is portrayed by Shouhei Osada (長田 庄平, Osada Shōhei).

=== Melo ===
Melo (メロ, Mero) is one of two wanted criminals from the future referred to as the god killers. In the prequel short novel Who Is Melo?, she was originally an artificial life form named Fū (フウ), whose original task is to document ancient history under the direct order from her creator, an executive producer of a documentary program. She was swayed to join Mela in his conquest, offering her historical knowledge to hunt down Susanoo and Loki. She also considered hunting the Man of the Beginning before the pair set their target on Ace Ukiyo's power of creation.

Alongside Mela, Melo briefly appears near the climax of the "Creation" DGP, prior to serving as a secondary antagonist of the film Kamen Rider Geats the Movie: Four Aces and the Black Fox. She is ultimately forcibly returned to the future with Mela after he is defeated by Kamen Rider Geats.

Melo is portrayed by Haruka Kudō (工藤 遥, Kudō Haruka).

=== Kiyoharu Usagami ===
Kiyoharu Usagami (宇佐神 清春, Usagami Kiyoharu) is a man who lives with Hazuki, a Queen Jyamato, and appears exclusively in the V-Cinema Kamen Rider Geats: Jyamato Awaking. He is killed by Aoto, a King Jyamato.

Kiyoharu Usagami is portrayed by Masahiro Usui (碓井 将大, Usui Masahiro).

=== Nemeru ===
Nemeru (ネメル) is a DGP producer and Niramu's predecessor who appears exclusively in the web special Geats Extra: Kamen Rider Gazer. He is defeated by Kamen Riders Gazer and Ziin before dying.

Utilizing the Zillion Driver, Nemeru can transform into a Kamen Rider 1-themed version of Gazer known as Kamen Rider Gazer Zero (仮面ライダーゲイザーゼロ, Kamen Raidā Geizā Zero).

Nemeru is portrayed by Sho Jinnai (陳内 将, Jin'nai Shō).

=== Miiru ===
Miiru (ミイル) is a DGP navigator and Tsumuri's predecessor who appears exclusively in the web special Geats Extra: Kamen Rider Gazer. She is devoured by a Rook Jyamato.

Miiru is portrayed by Yua Shiraishi (白石 優愛, Shiraishi Yua).
