= Ryuichi Kaji =

Japanese journalist

Ryūichi Kaji
- Born: 1896; Hyogo Prefecture
- Died: 1978 (aged 81–82)
- Occupation: Chief editor of Asahi Shimbun
- Known for: Writer of Tensei Jingo, journalist and political critic

Ryuichi Kaji (嘉治 隆一, Kaji Ryūichi; August 3, 1896 – May 19, 1978) was a Japanese journalist and political critic.

== Life ==
He was born in Hyogo Prefecture. Having graduated from the Department of Law of Tokyo University, he joined the East-Asiatic Commercial Intelligence Institute at Tokyo of the South Manchuria Railway. (The name of this institute was changed to the East Asiatic Economic Investigation Bureau.) Later he joined the Asahi Shimbun and in 1945, he became head the editorial board and wrote essays in Tensei Jingo. In 1947, he headed the Department of Publication of Asahi Shimbun. Later he became Instructor at Dokkyo University, and a member of the Ministry of Education's University educational accreditation committee and a member of other public committees.

== His Books ==
- Revisionism of Eduard Bernstein translation, Shueikaku, 1920
- Karl Marx and Friedrich Engels. co-authored by Nobuo Goto, Kohbundo Shobo 1925
- Modern Russian History Study. Dojinsha, 1925
- Asian Problems. Toen Shobo, 1939
- A Study of Asia. Orion Sha, 1940
- Soviet Economy since its establishment to today. Seibundo Shinkosha, 1941
- Nansoki. Shorinsha, 1942
- Those who contributed to history. Ooyashu Shuppan, 1948
- Social Problems in Meiji Era. Keiyusha, 1955
- Nakae Chomin. Kokudosha, 1956
- Ogata Taketora. Jiji Tsushinsha, 1962
- 20 Postwar Years of Okinawa. Jijitsushinsha, 1966
- Jinbutsu Mangekyo. Asahi Shimbun, 1967
- Okinawa Taiwan Diary. Jijitsushinsha, 1968
- 5 Distinguished Journalists - Nakae Chomin, Taguchi Ukichi, Miyake Setsurei, Hasegawa Nyozekan, Ogata Taketora. Asahi Shimbun, 1973
