= Hideo Aragaki =

Japanese columnist

- Born: 1903; Hida city, Gifu Prefecture
- Died: 1989 (aged 85–86)
- Occupation: Chief editor of Asahi Shimbun
- Known for: Writer of Tensei Jingo

Hideo Aragaki (荒垣 秀雄, Aragaki Hideo; July 19, 1903 – July 8, 1989) was a Japanese newspaperman and a columnist in the Showa era. He was known for writing essays in the Tensei Jingo of Asahi Shimbun for 17 years.

== Life ==
Born in 1903 in Hida city, Gifu Prefecture, he graduated from the Department of Political Economics, Waseda University and entered the Asahi Shimbun in 1926. He served as a war correspondent during the Manchurian Incident, and his writing ability was recognized at the coronation of George the sixth. In 1939, he headed the Society Department of the Asahi Shimbun. Later he headed the Rio de Janeiro Branch and Manila Branch of the Asahi Shimbun. He became a member of the editorial staff in November, 1945 and wrote the Tensei Jingo essays exclusively for 17 and a half years. In 1956, he was awarded the Kikuchi Kan Award. He retired from the newspaper in 1963 and later he was active as a columnist and a nature conservationist.
