= Miyadai =

Miyadai may refer to:

== Education ==
- Miyagi University
- University of Miyazaki

== People ==
- Kōhei Miyadai
- Shinji Miyadai
