= Christopher Tatsuki Kinjo =

Japanese footballer

Christopher Tatsuki Kinjo 金城 クリストファー 達樹
Personal information
- Full name: Christopher Tatsuki Kinjo
- Date of birth: 17 November 1993 (age 32)
- Place of birth: Okinawa, Japan
- Height: 1.80 m (5 ft 11 in)
- Position: Midfielder

Senior career*
Years	Team	Apps	(Gls)
2013–2014	Avispa Fukuoka	2	(0)
2015	FC Ryukyu	0	(0)
2016	Iwaki FC	2	(0)
Total		4	(0)
- * Club domestic league appearances and goals as of 31 December 2016, 12:44 (UTC)

Christopher Tatsuki Kinjo (金城 クリストファー 達樹, Kinjō Kurisutofā Tatsuki; born November 17, 1993) is a former Japanese football player who play as a Midfielder.

== Playing career ==
Christopher Tatsuki Kinjo played for J2 League club; Avispa Fukuoka from 2013 to 2014. In 2015, he moved to J3 League club; FC Ryukyu.

== Personal life ==
Christopher Tatsuki Kinjo is the older brother of Justin Toshiki Kinjo and Andre Taiki Kinjo both currently play at SC Sagamihara and Nankatsu SC, respectively. Christopher Kinjo was born in Japan, and is of American descent.
