= Tansui Ueekata =

Tansui Ueekata (湛水親方; 2 July 1623 – 26 January 1684) was an aristocrat-bureaucrat of the Ryukyu Kingdom. He was also a famous musician credited with the creation of Tansui-ryū (湛水流), an important music genre of Ryukyu culture.

"Tansui Ueekata" is actually a nickname. "Tansui" was his pseudonym, "Ueekata" was his rank. It was standard at the time for members of Ryukyu's aristocratic class to have two names: karana (唐名, "Chinese-style name") and yamatona (大和名, "Japanese-style name"). His karana was Ka Tokuyō (夏 徳庸), and yamatona was Kōchi Ueekata Kenchū (幸地 親方 賢忠) respectively.

Tansui Ueekata was a cousin of Shō Shōken. He was good at sanshin and ryūka. He was dispatched to Satsuma for four times. There he studied the theatre of Japan. Later, he incorporated Japanese elements into Ryukyuan music. He was appointed as odori bugyō (踊奉行, Magistrate of Dance) in 1672 and danced kumi odori for the entertainment of the Chinese envoys.

Shō Shōken totally denied the traditional culture of the Ryukyuan people, and was strongly opposed by Tansui Ueekata. It made Shō Shōken very angry. Tansui was removed from his position and forced to retire.
