= Kiyoshi Arakaki =

Karateka

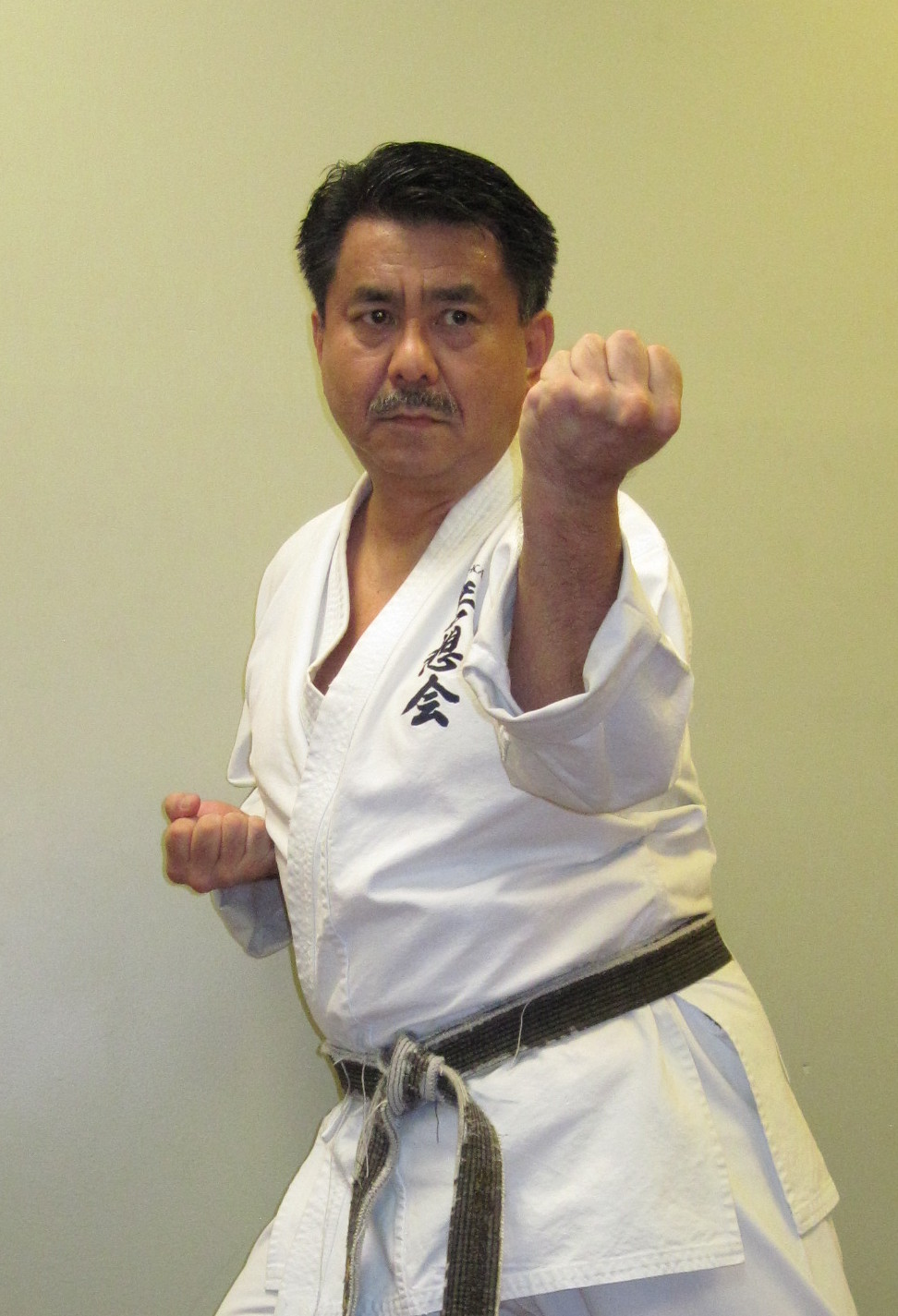
- Born: October 17, 1954; Naha, USCAR (now Naha, Okinawa, Japan)
- Native name: 新垣 清 Arakaki Kiyoshi
- Nationality: Japanese
- Style: Karate, Okinawa

Kiyoshi Arakaki (新垣 清, Arakaki Kiyoshi; October 17, 1954) is a karate practitioner, historian, novelist, and the founder of Okinawa Karate-Do Muso-Kai.

== Biography ==
Kiyoshi Arakaki was born on October 17, 1954, in Naha, Okinawa, Japan as the first son of Dr. Seiei Arakaki and Yoshiko Arakaki. At the age of 13, Kiyoshi Arakaki was introduced to Shōshin Nagamine's Matsubayashi-ryū. In 1973, he graduated from Naha High School, Okinawa. In 1977, he traveled to the United States. In 1977, he taught self-defense at Graceland University. In 1979, he worked for Mother Teresa's "Missionaries of Charity" in Kolkata, India. In 1982, he founded Muso-Kai Karate-Do and opened his first dojo in Salt Lake City, Utah.

== Philosophy ==
=== Walking in the Martial Arts (Gravity Applied) ===
Walking is a term for specific body movement patterns in martial arts, where a person's center of gravity is based in their feet (instead of their head or torso) which positions the body more upright (as opposed to leaning forward when led-by-the-head) and better able to absorb movements from an opponent.

== Select bibliography ==
- February 2000: The Secrets of Okinawan Karate
- January 2001: The Secret of Okinawan Karate Part 2
- December 2002: The Secrets of Okinawan Karate (English version)
- August 2004: Monkey (Story of Choki Motobu)
- March 2004: Los Secretos Del Karate De Okinawa: Esencia Y Tecnicas (The Secrets of Okinawan Karate Spanish version)
- September 2011: The Secret of Okinawan Karate Part 4
- May 2013: Elucidation Of Pinan or Heian (The Explanation Of Okinawa Karate As A Method Of Martial Arts)

== See also ==
- Comparison of karate styles
- Shuri-Te
- Okinawan martial arts
