= Justin Toshiki Kinjo =

Japanese footballer

Justin Toshiki Kinjo 金城 ジャスティン 俊樹
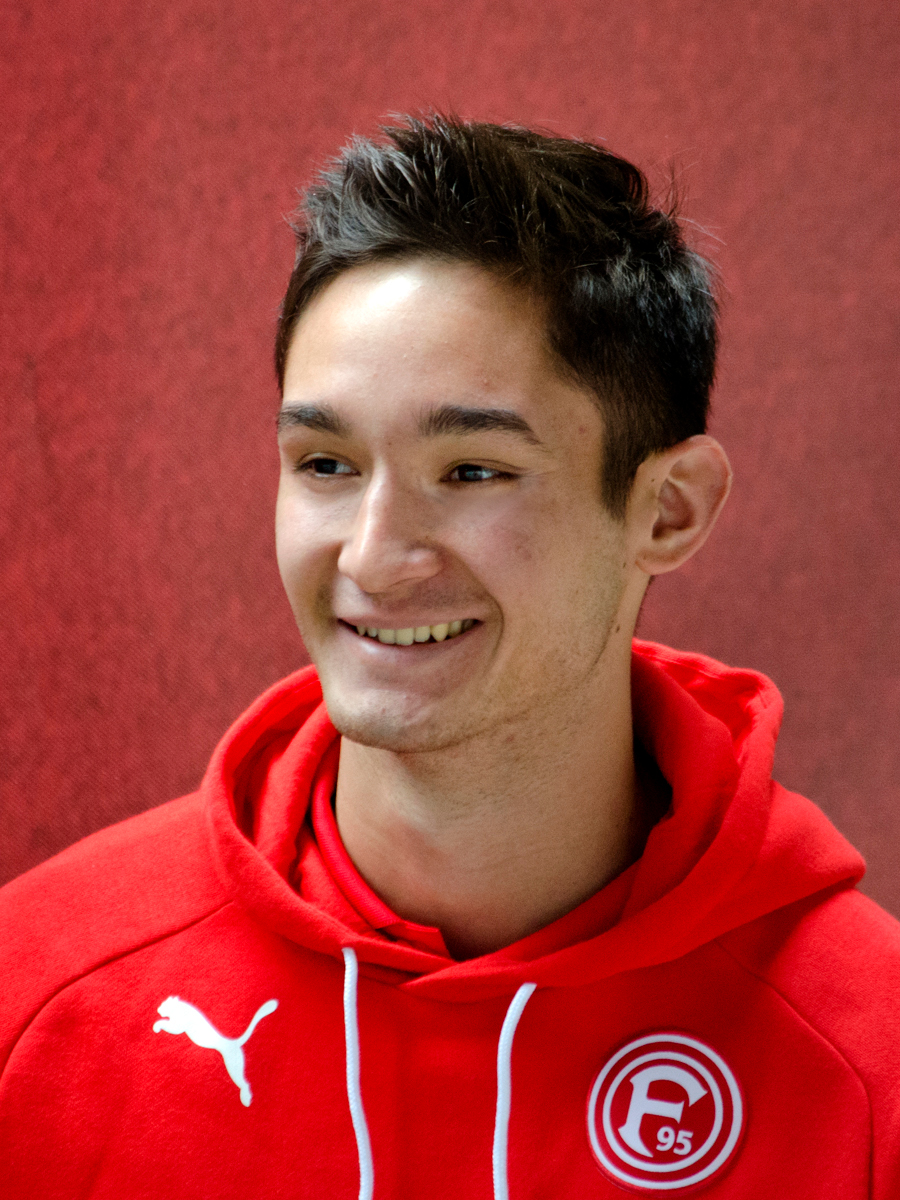

Personal information
- Full name: Justin Toshiki Kinjo
- Date of birth: 22 February 1997 (age 29)
- Place of birth: Okinawa, Japan
- Height: 1.80 m (5 ft 11 in)
- Position: Midfielder

Team information
- Current team: SC Sagamihara
- Number: 7

Youth career
- Yamauchi JFC
- –2014: JFA Academy Fukushima
- 2015–2016: 1860 Munich

Senior career*
Years	Team	Apps	(Gls)
2015–2016	1860 Munich II	7	(0)
2016–2018	Fortuna Düsseldorf II	54	(4)
2016–2018	Fortuna Düsseldorf	1	(0)
2018–2021	Thespakusatsu Gunma	70	(2)
2022	Vonds Ichihara	10	(0)
2023–	SC Sagamihara	0	(0)
- * Club domestic league appearances and goals as of 18 December 2022, 5:22 (UTC)

Justin Toshiki Kinjo (金城 ジャスティン 俊樹, Kinjō Jasutin Toshiki; 22 February 1997) is a Japanese professional footballer who plays as a Midfielder and currently play for J3 League club, SC Sagamihara.

== Career ==
Kinjo begin first youth career with Yamauchi JFC and JFA Academy Fukushima until 2014. Kinjo moved to Germany to defend the Munich club, TSV 1860 Munich as youth team for the 2015 to 2016 season, he later debut for reserve team in 2015 as TSV 1860 Munich II. Kinjo moved to Fortuna Düsseldorf II from 2016 as youth team. He debut as professional team in Düsseldorf, Fortuna Düsseldorf.

After abroad in Germany, Kincho return to Japan and joined to J2 club, Thespakusatsu Gunma on 17 August 2018 during mid season of J2 League. He leave from the club on 17 December 2021 after four years at Gunma been ended.

On 14 April 2022, Kinjo moved to Vonds Ichihara ahead for 2022 season. He left from the club in 2022 after a season at Ichihara.

On 17 December 2022, Kinjo announcement transfer to J3 club, SC Sagamihara has been officially confirmed for upcoming 2023 season after he leave from Vonds Ichihara at end of the 2022 season.

== Personal life ==
Justin Kinjo was born in Japan, and holds American citizenship through descent. Toshiki Kinjo is the younger brother of former footballer, Christopher Tatsuki Kinjo and elder brother of Andre Taiki Kinjo was also footballer for Nankatsu SC.

== Career statistics ==
=== Club ===
As of the start for 2025 season.

Club	Season	League			National Cup		League Cup		Other		Total	
Club	Season	Division	Apps	Goals	Apps	Goals	Apps	Goals	Apps	Goals	Apps	Goals
Thespakusatsu Gunma	2018	J3 League	14	1	0	0	0	0	-		14	1
Thespakusatsu Gunma	2019	J3 League	19	0	2	0	0	0	-		21	0
Thespakusatsu Gunma	2020	J2 League	13	1	0	0	0	0	-		13	1
Thespakusatsu Gunma	2021	J2 League	24	0	2	0	0	0	-		26	0
Vonds Ichihara	2022	Kantō Soccer League	10	2	0	0	0	0	0	0	10	2
SC Sagamihara	2023	J3 League	7	0	1	0	0	0	0	0	8	1
SC Sagamihara	2024	J3 League	11	1	1	0	1	0	0	0	13	1
SC Sagamihara	2025	J3 League	0	0	0	0	0	0	0	0	0	0
Career total			98	5	6	0	1	0	0	0	105	5
