= Yara (surname) =

Yara is a Japanese surname (or given name) from Okinawa that may refer to:

- Chatan Yara (北谷 屋良; 1668–1756), Okinawan martial artist
- Chōbyō Yara (屋良 朝苗; 1902–1997), Okinawan politician
- Passion Yara (パッション屋良; born 1976), Okinawan comedian
- Yusaku Yara (屋良 有作; born 1948), Japanese actor
