= Xinyuan (disambiguation) =

Xinyuan may refer to:

== China ==
- Xinyuan County (新源县), Ili Kazakh Autonomous Prefecture, Xinjiang
- Xinyuan Real Estate (鑫苑置业), real estate company
- Xinyuan, Siyang County (新袁镇), town in Siyang County, Jiangsu

== Taiwan ==
- Xinyuan, Pingtung (新園鄉), or Sinyuan, a rural township in Pingtung County

== People ==
- Li Xinyuan
- Liu Xinyuan
- Mao Xinyuan
- Yu Xinyuan
- Xinyuan Ping (新垣平; died 163 BC), the sorcerer during Han dynasty
