= Nakama (surname) =

Nakama (written: 仲間 or 名嘉真, Okinawan: Nakama) is a Ryukyuan surname. Notable people with the surname include:

- Nakama Chozo (名嘉真 朝増; 1899–1982), Japanese karateka
- Dave Nakama, American college baseball coach
- Hayato Nakama (仲間 隼斗; born 1992), Japanese footballer
- Keo Nakama (1920–2011), American swimmer
- Yukie Nakama (仲間 由紀恵; born 1979), Japanese actress, singer and idol
