= Tokuro Irie =

Japanese journalist, newscaster and essayist (1913–1989)

- Born: 1913; Fukuoka Prefecture
- Died: 1989 (aged 75–76)
- Occupations: Journalist(Asahi Shimbun), Main caster of News Scope
- Known for: Writer of Tensei Jingo

Tokuro Irie (入江徳郎, Irie Tokurō; July 15, 1913 – September 5, 1989) was a Japanese journalist, newscaster and essayist.

== Life ==
- Graduated from Tochiku High School in Fukuoka Prefecture, Japan, and from Tokyo University. He began working for the Asahi Shimbun, a Japanese newspaper company. He was dispatched to Nomonhan as a war correspondent and reported the Battles of Khalkhin Gol. Between May 1963 and May 1970, he wrote essays in Tensei Jingo column as a member of the Asahi editorial board. He served as a main caster of JNN's News Scope, broadcast on TBS (Tokyo Broadcasting System Television) from October 1969 to March 1981.

== Books ==
- Tokuro Irie and Shozo Oogiya Scoops not reported Hanashi Sha, 1948 which was the original of the film Midday duel.
- Tokuro Irie Crybaby newspaperman Masu Shobou, 1950
- Tokuro Irie Samurai newspaperman Masu Shobou, 1954
