= Uehara =

Uehara (written: 上原 lit. "upper plain" or 植原 lit. "planted plain") is a Japanese surname. In Okinawan language, it's pronounced as 'Wiibaru. Notable people with the surname include:

- Ayako Uehara (golfer) (上原 彩子; born 1983), Japanese golfer
- Ayako Uehara (pianist) (上原 彩子; born 1980), Japanese classical pianist
- Azumi Uehara (上原 あずみ; born 1984), Japanese singer
- Bin Uehara (上原 敏; 1908–1944), Japanese singer and soldier
- Edwin Uehara (born 1969), Peruvian-Japanese footballer
- Etsujirō Uehara (植原 悦二郎; 1877–1962), politician and cabinet minister
- Futoshi Uehara (上原 太; born 1980), Japanese musician
- Hiromi Uehara (上原 ひろみ; born 1979), Japanese jazz composer and pianist
- Ken Uehara (上原 謙; 1909–1991), Japanese actor
- Kimiko Uehara (上原 きみこ; born 1946), Japanese manga artist
- Kiyoshi Uehara (植原 清; born 1948), Japanese fencer
- Koichi Uehara (born 1947), Japanese golfer
- Koji Uehara (上原 浩治; born 1975), Japanese baseball player
- Leonardo Uehara (born 1974), Peruvian footballer
- Makoto Uehara (上原 誠; born 1984), Japanese kickboxer
- Mie Uehara (上原 三枝; born 1971), Japanese speed skater
- Misa Uehara (上原 美佐; 1937–2003), Japanese actress
- Miyu Uehara (上原 美優; 1987–2011), Japanese gravure idol and television personality
- Miyuki Uehara (上原 美幸; born 1995), Japanese long-distance runner
- Rena Uehara (上原 れな; born 1986), Japanese singer-songwriter
- Ryōji Uehara (上原 良司; 1922–1945), Imperial Japanese Army flight captain
- Shigeru Uehara (上原 繁; born 1947), Japanese automotive engineer
- Shinya Uehara (上原 慎也; born 1986), Japanese footballer
- Takako Uehara (上原 多香子; born 1983), Japanese singer and actress
- Uehara Yūsaku (上原 勇作; 1856–1933), Japanese general
- Yasutsune Uehara (上原 康恒; born 1949), Japanese boxer

== Fictional characters ==
- Anko Uehara (上原 杏子), a character in the manga series Great Teacher Onizuka
- Tasuku Uehara (上原 祐), a character in the light novel series Gamers!
- Himari Uehara (上原 ひまり) a character from the BanG Dream! franchise
- Ayumu Uehara (上原 歩夢), a character in the media project Nijigasaki High School Idol Club
- Kamui Uehara (上原 神威), a character from the videogame The Silver Case

== See also ==
- Siege of Uehara, a battle of the Sengoku period
