= Tamashiro =

Tamashiro (written: 玉城) is a Japanese surname. Notable people with the surname include:

- Akio Tamashiro (born 1979), Japanese-Peruvian karateka
- Jerry Tamashiro (born 1971), Japanese-Peruvian footballer
- Sachi Tamashiro (born 1980), Japanese-Mexican actress
- Shungo Tamashiro (玉城 峻吾; born 1991), Japanese footballer
- Tim Tamashiro, Japanese-Canadian jazz singer and radio presenter
- Tina Tamashiro (玉城 ティナ; born 1997), Japanese model and idol
- Yukiya Tamashiro (玉城 幸弥; born 1993), Japanese footballer
