= Yamato Kinjo =

Japanese actor (born 1983)

- 金城 大和
- Born: September 9, 1983 (age 42); Naha, Okinawa Prefecture, Japan
- Occupation: Actor
- Years active: 2010–present
- Spouse: Sayaka Kotani (m. 2019)

Yamato Kinjo (金城 大和, Kinjō Yamato; born September 9, 1983, in Naha, Okinawa Prefecture) is a Japanese actor who is affiliated with Stay Luck. He played the role of Nobuharu Udo (Kyoryu Blue) in the 2013 Super Sentai TV series Zyuden Sentai Kyoryuger and Takeshi Goutokuji (Kamen Rider Shirowe) in the 2022 Kamen Rider TV series Kamen Rider Geats.

== Early life ==
Kinjo was born in Naha, Okinawa Prefecture, in 1983. In 2002, he graduated from high school and moved to Tokyo. He worked part time doing bar and security work.

== Acting career ==
Kinjo started as an actor in 2010, mainly acting in plays on stage. In 2013, at the age of 29, he appeared in Zyuden Sentai Kyoryuger as Nobuharu Udo/Kyoryu Blue. Kinjo expressed his joy, saying "I become a hero in this year.”

In 2014, he began a voice acting career and voiced Shay Obsidian in Yu-Gi-Oh! ARC-V. In 2022, he was cast as Takeshi Goutokuji/Kamen Rider Shirowe in Kamen Rider Geats.

== Personal life ==
On January 3, 2019, he announced his marriage to actress Sayaka Kotani.

== Filmography ==
=== TV series ===
Title	Year	Role	Network	Other notes
Zyuden Sentai Kyoryuger	2013	Nobuharu Udo/Kyoryu Blue	TV Asahi	
Kamen Rider Geats	2022	Takeshi Goutokuji/Kamen Rider Shirowe	TV Asahi	
Ohsama Sentai King-Ohger	2023	Nobuharu Udo/Kyoryu Blue	TV Asahi	Eps 32

=== Anime ===
Year	Title	Role	Network	Other notes
2014	Yu-Gi-Oh! ARC-V	Shun Kurosaki (Shay Obsidian)		
2025	Okinawa de Suki ni Natta Ko ga Hōgen Sugite Tsurasugiru	Tetsu Higa		
2025	The Beginning After the End	Reynolds Leywin		

=== Films ===
Year	Title	Role	Other notes
2013	Tokumei Sentai Go-Busters vs. Kaizoku Sentai Gokaiger: The Movie	Kyoryu Blue (Voice)	
2013	Kamen Rider × Super Sentai × Space Sheriff: Super Hero Taisen Z	Nobuharu Udo/Kyoryu Blue	
2013	Zyuden Sentai Kyoryuger: Gaburincho of Music	Nobuharu Udo/Kyoryu Blue	
2014	Zyuden Sentai Kyoryuger vs. Go-Busters: The Great Dinosaur Battle! Farewell Our Eternal Friends	Nobuharu Udo/Kyoryu Blue	
2015	Ressha Sentai ToQger vs. Kyoryuger: The Movie	Nobuharu Udo/Kyoryu Blue	
2025	Sound of Wings	Tanaka	

=== Dub ===
Title	Role	Dub for	Other notes
47 Meters Down	Benjamin	Santiago Segura	
Annika	DS Tyrone Clarke	Ukweli Roach	
Beverly Hills Cop	Detective Billy Rosewood	Judge Reinhold	
Beverly Hills Cop II	Detective Billy Rosewood	Judge Reinhold	
The Birthday Cake	Giovanni "Gio"	Shiloh Fernandez	
Burnt	David	Sam Keeley	
Castle Rock	"The Kid"	Bill Skarsgård	
A Dog's Way Home	Gavin	Barry Watson	
Eddington	Vernon Jefferson Peak	Austin Butler	
Great White	Joji "Joe" Minase	Tim Kano	
John Wick	Iosef Tarasov	Alfie Allen	
Mortal Engines	Toa Heke	Kahn West	
A Most Wanted Man	Issa Karpov	Grigoriy Dobrygin	
Nightcrawler	Rick	Riz Ahmed	
Norman	Bill Kavish	Dan Stevens	
Once Upon a Time in Hollywood	Tex	Austin Butler	
Perry Mason	Paul Drake	Chris Chalk	
Power Rangers Dino Force Brave	Jeon Hyeonjun/Brave Black Dino	Hong Sungho	
Proven Innocent	Levi Scott	Riley Smith	
Red Dwarf	Tutt Johnson	Joe Sims	
Safe House	Sam Blackwell	James Burrows	
Smallfoot	Garry	Animation	
Tau	Subject 2	Fiston Barek	
Ted 2	Tom Brady	Tom Brady	
The Winchesters	Carlos Cervantez	Jojo Fleites	
Voltes V: Legacy: Super Electromagnetic Edition	Mark Gordon	Radson Flores	
Wonder	Mr. Browne	Daveed Diggs	
