= Miyagi (surname) =

Miyagi (written: 宮城 lit. "shrine fortress") is a Japanese surname. It can be read as Miyashiro, or Naagusuku in the Ryukyu Islands. Notable people with the surname include:

- Atsushi Miyagi (宮城 淳; 1931-2021), Japanese tennis player
- Chōjun Miyagi (宮城 長順; 1888–1953), Okinawan martial artist
- Kintaro Miyagi, Filipino footballer
- Juma Miyagi (born 2003), Ugandan cricketer
- Kyoko Miyagi (宮城 恭子; born 1955), also known as Kyouko Tonguu, is a Japanese voice actress
- Mai Miyagi (宮城 舞; born 1988), Japanese model and television personality
- Masafumi Miyagi (宮城 雅史; born 1991), Japanese footballer
- Michiko Miyagi (Cassandra Miyagi), Japanese pro wrestler
- Michio Miyagi (宮城 道雄; 1894–1956), Japanese koto musician
- Mimi Miyagi (born 1973), the screen name of Filipina porn star and aspiring politician Melody Damayo
- Riko Miyagi (宮城 理子), Japanese manga artist
- Satoshi Miyagi (宮城 聰; born 1959), Japanese theatre director
- Vern Miyagi, United States Army general and civil servant
- Yotoku Miyagi (宮城 与徳; 1903–1943), Okinawan Marxist

== Fictional characters ==
- Mr. Miyagi, a martial arts mentor in The Karate Kid series, loosely based on Chojun Miyagi
- Ryota Miyagi, a character in the manga series Slam Dunk
- Yō Miyagi, a character in the manga series Junjo Romantica: Pure Romance
- Miyagi, the wife of Genjurō in the Japanese film Ugetsu
