= Niigaki =

Niigaki is a Japanese surname. Notable people with the surname include:

- Risa Niigaki (新垣 里沙, born 1988), Japanese actress and singer
- Takashi Niigaki (新垣 隆, born 1970), Japanese music teacher
