= Misaki Oshiro =

Japanese weightlifter (born 1984)

Personal information
- Nationality: Japan
- Born: 22 May 1984 (age 42) Naha, Okinawa
- Height: 1.45 m (4 ft 9 in)
- Weight: 48 kg (106 lb)

Sport
- Sport: Weightlifting
- Event: 48 kg
- Club: Okinawa Ecotour

Misaki Oshiro (大城 みさき, Oshiro Misaki; born May 22, 1984 in Naha, Okinawa) is a Japanese weightlifter. Oshiro represented Japan at the 2008 Summer Olympics in Beijing, where she competed for the women's flyweight category (48 kg), along with her compatriot Hiromi Miyake. Oshiro placed eighth in this event, as she successfully lifted 80 kg in the single-motion snatch, and hoisted 92 kg in the two-part, shoulder-to-overhead clean and jerk, for a total of 172 kg.
