= Shingaki =

Shingaki is a Japanese surname. Notable people with the surname include:

- Rina Shingaki (進垣リナ, born 1998), Japanese wrestler
- Satoshi Shingaki (新垣諭, born 1964), Japanese boxer
- Tarusuke Shingaki (新垣 樽助, born 1976), Japanese voice actor
