= Aragaki =

Aragaki (written: 新垣) is a Ryukyuan surname. Originated from China. Another Japanese surname also spelt Aragaki in romanisation is 荒垣.

Notable people with the surname include:

- Hideo Aragaki (荒垣 秀雄, 1903–1989), Japanese journalist
- Takeshi Aragaki (新垣 武, born 1956), Japanese Go player
- Tsutomu Aragaki (新垣 勉, born 1952), Japanese singer
- Yoshimitsu Aragaki (新垣 吉光, 1949-2002), Japanese boxer
- Yui Aragaki (新垣 結衣, born 1988), Japanese actress, model and singer

== Fictional characters ==
- Ayase Aragaki (新垣 あやせ), a character in the light novel series Oreimo
