= List of Uchu Sentai Kyuranger characters =

Uchu Sentai Kyuranger (宇宙戦隊キュウレンジャー, Uchū Sentai Kyūrenjā) is a Japanese tokusatsu series that serves as the 41st installment in the Super Sentai franchise and the 29th entry in the Heisei era. Much of the series takes inspiration from Greco-Roman mythology while the antagonist faction, Jark Matter, take cues from the shogunates of Japan's Edo period the tyrants of Ancient Greece, and paranormal terminologies.

== Main characters ==
=== Kyurangers ===
The main heroes of Uchu Sentai Kyuranger. From left to right: Shou Ronpo, Raptor 283, Naga Ray, Balance, Stinger, Tsurugi Ohtori, Lucky, Garu, Champ, Hammie, Spada, and Kotaro Sakuma.

The eponymous Kyurangers is a team of warriors consisting of humanoids, androids, and animalistic aliens from different star systems who serve as members of the Rebellion (リベリオン, Riberion), an insurrection army fighting to liberate the universe from the evil Jark Matter syndicate, using the powers of magical stones called Kyutamas. With the exception of Lucky, each member's suit has unique features. They operate out of and travel through space in a spaceship called the Orion (オリオン号, Orion-gō; Offensive Resistance Interstellar Orbiter of RebellioN), named after one of the legendary 88 saviors, Orion. After the Orion is destroyed however, they obtain a second, stronger ship called the Battle Orion Ship.

Each primary member carries a Seiza Blaster (セイザブラスター, Seiza Burasutā; Constellation Blaster) gauntlet, which allows them to transform and access their Kyutamas' powers, and a Kyu The Weapon (キューザウェポン, Kyū Za Uepon) sidearm, which can be reconfigured into varying forms. Their team finishers are the All-Star Crash (オールスタークラッシュ, Ōru Sutā Kurasshu) via the Seiza Blasters and the All-Star Impact (オールスタースインパクト, Ōru Sutā Inpakuto) via the Kyu The Weapons.

Once the Kyurangers have been declared enemies of Jark Matter, the latter's Shogunate establish a bounty of 10.000.000 pongi (ポンギ) for each member. Due to the excess number of team members, the Kyurangers have to conserve the Kyutamas' energy by only allowing a limited number of members to be deployed on missions, with the team being randomly chosen using a bingo tumbler-like device called the Kyulette (キューレット, Kyūretto) while the others remain on standby if needed.

Once all nine of the original Kyurangers are assembled, the team launches their counterattack on Jark Matter by liberating Earth from their control. They later add three more members, one being their commander and the other two are from Earth. After obtaining the Tokei Kyutama, the team splits into two factions; with one staying in the present to rescue one of their companions while the other travels to the past to learn more about Jark Matter's leader, Don Armage. Upon their reunion, the Kyurangers depart from Earth to confront Don Armage on Planet Southern Cross in the Crux System to stop his Planedium Bomb from destroying the entire universe before returning to Earth to confront and defeat Don Armage once and for all.

==== Lucky ====
Lucky (ラッキー, Rakkī) is a naive young man and interstellar traveler with amazing luck and a strong will from Planet Luth (惑星ルース, Wakusei Rūsu) in the Leo Minor System (コジシ座系, Kojishi-za-kei). Because of his interpersonal skills and faith in others, he becomes a key member of the Kyurangers, helping recruit new members and resolve their personal troubles on several occasions. Apparently a man who was blissfully unaware of Jark Matter's universal campaign, Lucky later learns that he is actually a refugee prince from Planet Kaien (惑星カイエン, Wakusei Kaien) in the Leo System (シシ座系, Shishi-za-kei) and a descendant of Orion. The former trait eventually resulted in Lucky becoming his homeworld's king after discovering his father Aslan was supposed to have been murdered by Jark Matter's Fuku Shogun Kukuruga years prior, but was instead brainwashed into one of Don Armage's thralls. With the help of his fellow Kyurangers, Lucky is able to free his father from Don Armage's control before defeating the latter and resuming his intergalactic travels with Garu by his side.

As the "Super Star" (スーパースター, Sūpā Sutā), Shishi Red (シシレッド, Shishi Reddo), Lucky wields the Kyu Sword (キューソード, Kyū Sōdo). His finishers are the Regulus Crush (レグルスクラッシュ, Regurusu Kurasshu) via the Seiza Blaster and the Regulus Impact (レグルスインパクト, Regurusu Inpakuto) via the Kyu Sword.

After his encounter with Orion, Lucky acquires the Saiko Kyutama, which allows him to transform into the white-colored "Miracle Star" (ミラクルスター, Mirakuru Sutā), Shishi Red Orion (シシレッドオリオン, Shishi Reddo Orion). While transformed, he gains the ability to open portals in spacetime and summon any of the Kyurangers' weapons. His finisher is the Infinish Blast (インフィニッシュブラスト, Infinisshu Burasuto).

Lucky is portrayed by Takumi Kizu (岐洲 匠, Kizu Takumi). As a child, Lucky is portrayed by Rei Tanaka (田中 レイ, Tanaka Rei).

==== Stinger ====
Stinger (スティンガー, Sutingā) is a cool, mysterious humanoid alien with a scorpion-like tail capable of producing a venom that can affect organic and mechanical targets from Planet Needle (惑星ニードル, Wakusei Nīdoru) in the Scorpio System (サソリ座系, Sasori-za-kei). Following his brother, Scorpio, betraying their home planet for Jark Matter, Stinger spent the rest of his life searching for him until he was scouted by Shou Ronpo to become the first contemporary Kyuranger, Sasori Orange (サソリオレンジ, Sasori Orenji). Ever since, he spied on Jark Matter for the Rebellion until he blew his cover on Earth to save Kotaro and Jiro Sakuma. During the intervening years, Stinger witnessed the murder of Doctor Anton's good-half, for which Champ accused him before he cleared up the misunderstanding and going on to become his partner. Amidst his final battle with Scorpio, Stinger injected himself with his own venom to use their people's Antares (アンタレス, Antaresu) technique to boost his strength, even in spite of the life-threatening cost before his brother extracted it from him and redeemed himself by giving his life to save the Kyurangers. Following Don Armage's defeat, Stinger is promoted to the rank of the Kyurangers' new commander.

As the "Poison Star" (ポイズンスター, Poizun Sutā), Sasori Orange, Stinger wields the Kyu Spear (キュースピア, Kyū Supia). His finishers are the Antares Crush (アンタレスクラッシュ, Antaresu Kurasshu) via the Seiza Blaster and the Antares Impact (アンタレスインパクト, Antaresu Inpakuto) via the Kyu Spear. Stinger's suit differs from the others in that he retains his tail, which he can use as a weapon.

Stinger is portrayed by Yosuke Kishi (岸 洋佑, Kishi Yōsuke). As a child, Stinger is portrayed by Hinata Igarashi (五十嵐 陽向, Igarashi Hinata).

==== Garu ====
Garu (ガル) is a lupine alien with Hiroshima dialect from the Lupus System (オオカミ座系, Ōkami-za-kei) who lost his pride, homeworld, and entire clan to Jark Matter. Ever since, he lived on the Jark Matter refugee world, Planet Jagjag (惑星ジャグジャグ, Wakusei Jagujagu), until Lucky helped him recover from his trauma and fight for himself. While not the brightest or most patient Kyuranger, Garu is always reliable in battle and goes on to become Lucky's most trusted partner. After Don Armage is defeated, Garu travels with Lucky through space.

As the "Beast Star" (ビーストスター, Bīsuto Sutā), Ookami Blue (オオカミブルー, Ōkami Burū), Garu wields the Kyu Claw (キュークロー, Kyū Kurō). His finishers are the Lupus Crush (ルプスクラッシュ, Rupusu Kurasshu) via the Seiza Blaster and the Lupus Impact (ルプスインパクト, Rupusu Inpakuto) via the Kyu Claw. Garu's suit differs from the others in that it has claws and wolf fur.

Garu is voiced by Kazuya Nakai (中井 和哉, Nakai Kazuya).

==== Balance ====
Balance (バランス, Baransu) is a 300-year old smooth-talking and dramatic mechanical life form with the ability to control machines from the Libra System (テンビン座系, Tenbin-za-kei). After meeting Naga during a robbery in the Ophiuchus System, they formed the BN Team (BN団, Bī Enu-dan; Balance and Naga) and became bounty hunters for Jark Matter until they met Lucky and joined the Rebellion. After Don Armage's defeat, Balance and Naga reformed the BN Team and dedicated themselves to salvaging Jark Matter's stolen treasures.

As the "Trick Star" (トリックスター, Torikku Sutā), Tenbin Gold (テンビンゴールド, Tenbin Gōrudo), Balance wields the Kyu Crossbow (キュークロスボウ, Kyū Kurosubō). His finishers are the Libra Crush (リブラクラッシュ, Ribura Kurasshu) via the Seiza Blaster and the Libra Impact (リブラインパクト, Ribura Inpakuto) via the Kyu Crossbow. Balance's suit differs from the others in that it resembles mechanical armor rather than spandex.

Balance is voiced by Yūki Ono (小野 友樹, Ono Yūki).

==== Champ ====
Champ (チャンプ, Chanpu) is a happy-go-lucky yet hot-blooded bull-themed fighting robot from the Taurus System (オウシ座系, Oushi-za-kei). Despite his reputation as a ladies' man, he displays incredible loyalty to his friends. While fighting Jark Matter, Champ discovers he was originally built as the Bull-Type General-Purpose Destruction Weapon (牛型汎用破壊兵器, Ushi-gata Hanyō Hakai Heiki) for Jark Matter before the good-half of his creator, Doctor Anton, ran off with him and reprogrammed him to value all life in the universe. Following this, he spent the next nine years as a professional wrestler and became a champion until Anton was assassinated by Scorpio. Champ joined the Rebellion to find his creator's killer, who he believed was Stinger until he learned the truth. After traveling back in time to learn more about Don Armage, Champ stayed behind in the past with Shou Ronpo to ensure the Kyurangers' formation and put his commander in cryogenic stasis. During this time, he learned of his origins, took on the alias of "Yagyu Jubei" (ヤギュウジュウベエ, Yagyū Jūbee), and temporarily left the Kyurangers to find his "old friend" Zero. He eventually rejoins his allies in the present, but Anton's evil-half uses a mind control chip in Champ's circuitry to reinstate his original programming before Stinger saved him. After Don Armage is defeated, Champ returns to the robot wrestling circuit, regaining his championship belt and going on to have a 99-win streak.

As the "Ring Star" (リングスター, Ringu Sutā), Oushi Black (オウシブラック, Oushi Burakku), Champ wields the Kyu Axe (キューアックス, Kyū Akkusu). His finishers are the Aldebaran Crush (アルデバランクラッシュ, Arudebaran Kurasshu) via the Seiza Blaster and the Aldebaran Impact (アルデバランインパクト, Arudebaran Inpakuto) via the Kyu Axe. Champ's suit differs from the others in that it is bulkier and more mechanical in appearance while his visor extends past his helmet to resemble bull horns.

Champ is voiced by Akio Ōtsuka (大塚 明夫, Ōtsuka Akio).

==== Naga Ray ====
Naga Ray (ナーガ・レイ, Nāga Rei) is a young humanoid alien with the ability to temporarily paralyze his targets from the Ophiuchus System (ヘビツカイ座系, Hebitsukai-za-kei), whose people are identical in appearance. Although his race had long ago sealed their emotions as a result of a catastrophic war on their home planet, his peculiar interest in emotions led to an encounter with Balance and they became bounty hunters. After they met the Kyurangers, Naga quickly befriends them in the hopes of learning more about emotions as well as the difference between good and evil. Amidst their battles against Jark Matter however, Naga becomes troubled by his lack of emotions, leading to him being brainwashed by Don Armage's Fuku Shogun Akyanba into becoming Dark Naga (ダークナーガ, Dāku Nāga) and joining Jark Matter until his allies eventually manage to save him. After Don Armage's defeat, Naga and Balance reform the BN Team and dedicate themselves to retrieving Jark Matter's stolen treasures.

As the "Silent Star" (サイレントスター, Sairento Sutā), Hebitsukai Silver (ヘビツカイシルバー, Hebitsukai Shirubā), Naga wields the Kyu Sickle (キューシックル, Kyū Shikkuru). His finishers are the Ophiuchus Crush (オフューカスクラッシュ, Ofyūkasu Kurasshu) via the Seiza Blaster and the Ophiuchus Impact (オフューカスインパクト, Ofyūkasu Inpakuto) via the Kyu Sickle. Naga's suit differs from the others in that it has a scale pattern, resembling that of a snake.

As Dark Naga, he utilized a dark copy of the Seiza Blaster called the Dark Seiza Blaster (ダークセイザブラスター, Dāku Seiza Burasutā; Dark Constellation Blaster) to transform into Hebitsukai Metal (ヘビツカイメタル, Hebitsukai Metaru). While transformed, he gained umbrakinesis. He also wielded a dark copy of the Kyu Sickle called the Dark Kyu Sickle (ダークキューシックル, Dāku Kyū Shikkuru), which allowed him to perform the Metal Ophiuchus Impact (メタルオフューカスインパクト, Metaru Ofyūkasu Inpakuto) finisher. After the Kyurangers free him from his brainwashing, Naga gains a purified version of this form.

Naga Ray is portrayed by Taiki Yamazaki (山崎 大輝, Yamazaki Taiki), who also portrays the Ophiuchus System's residents.

==== Hammie ====
Hammie (ハミィ, Hamyi) is a young humanoid alien ninja and master of powerful ninja arts passed down through her family over generations with the ability to become invisible from the Chamaeleon System (カメレオン座系, Kamereon-za-kei). As a child, she was an introvert who gained the courage to speak after alerting her villagers of Jark Matter's invasion. Over time, and following an encounter with a young Hoshi Minato that set her on the path to finding her dream to live by, she became an outspoken woman and member of the Rebellion. After Don Armage is defeated, Hammie attends a university to become a school teacher.

During the events of Uchu Sentai Kyuranger vs. Space Squad, Space Ninja Demost captures Hammie's mentor Tsurukiku and forces her to steal the Space Federation's Neo Kyutama so he can take over Earth. While her allies were initially conflicted over her loyalties, they eventually discovered the truth and helped Hammie save her mentor and defeat Demost.

As the "Shinobi Star" (シノビスター, Shinobi Sutā), Chameleon Green (カメレオングリーン, Kamereon Gurīn), Hammie wields the Kyu Rapier (キューレイピア, Kyū Reipia). Her finishers are the Hameleon Crush (ハミリオンクラッシュ, Hamirion Kurasshu) via the Seiza Blaster and the Hameleon Impact (ハミリオンインパクト, Hamirion Inpakuto) via the Kyu Rapier. Hammie's suit differs from the others in that her helmet resembles a chameleon's head, with the two bulbous mounds resembling eyes and the mouth forming the helmet's visor.

Hammie is portrayed by Sakurako Okubo (大久保 桜子, Ōkubo Sakurako). As a child, Hammie is portrayed by Maharu Nemoto (根本 真陽, Nemoto Maharu).

==== Raptor 283 ====
Raptor 283 (ラプター283, Raputā Ni Hachi San) is a serious and loyal android built on Planet Rebellion (惑星リベリオン, Wakusei Riberion) in the Aquila System (ワシ座系, Washi-za-kei). As she is based on non-combat android designs developed by Tsurugi, she initially served as Shou's secretary and the Orion's chief pilot. Despite this, she is also a daydreamer prone to delusions. After recognizing this, Lucky encourages Raptor to make her dream of becoming a Kyuranger a reality, allowing her to acquire the Washi Kyutama and become Washi Pink (ワシピンク, Washi Pinku).

As the "Speed Star" (スピードスター, Supīdo Sutā), Washi Pink, Raptor wields the Kyu Shot (キューショット, Kyū Shotto) handgun. Her finishers are the Altair Crush (アルタイルクラッシュ, Arutairu Kurasshu) via the Seiza Blaster and the Altair Impact (アルタイルインパクト, Arutairu Inpakuto) via the Kyu Shot. Raptor's suit differs from the others in that it has a pair of eagle wings that allow her to fly.

Raptor 283 is voiced by M·A·O.

==== Spada ====
Spada (スパーダ, Supāda) is a humanoid alien from the Dorado System (カジキ座系, Kajiki-za-kei) who aims to become the best cook in the universe. Often serving as a parent figure to his teammates, he is reliable albeit not always sincere. He likes to make food or cooking-related metaphors based on Italian and Greek cuisines and the Italian language. His dream to become a chef stems from his poor background after his planet was invaded by Jark Matter, which resulted in a food shortage and him taking care of his starving siblings. After Don Armage is defeated, Spada fulfills his dream of opening a restaurant.

As the "Food Mei-Star" (フードマイスター, Fūdo Maisutā), Kajiki Yellow (カジキイエロー, Kajiki Ierō), Spada wields the Kyu Slasher (キュースラッシャー, Kyū Surasshā) dagger. His finishers are the Dorado Crush (ドラドクラッシュ, Dorado Kurasshu) via the Seiza Blaster and the Dorado Impact (ドラドインパクト, Dorado Inpakuto) via the Kyu Slasher. Spada's suit differs from the others in that his visor protrudes significantly, resembling that of a swordfish's nose, which he can use as a weapon.

Spada is portrayed by Tetsuji Sakakibara (榊原 徹士, Sakakibara Tetsuji).

==== Shou Ronpo ====
Shou Ronpo (ショウ・ロンポー, Shō Ronpō) is a dragon-like alien and commander of the Kyurangers from the Draco System (リュウ座系, Ryū-za-kei). He tries to come off as imposing, but ends up behaving more like a mischievous old man. In reality, he is a guilt-ridden individual after losing his predecessor and friend, Big Bear who discourages insubordination within the Kyurangers' ranks for fear of repeating his mistake. Despite this, he is capable of maintaining his composure even in the direst situations. Before forming the Kyurangers, Shou journeyed across various constellations to acquire the Skill Kyutamas, using the Ryu Skill Kyutama to become Ryu Violet (リュウバイオレット, Ryū Baioretto). Encouraged by the other Kyurangers to come to terms with Big Bear's death, he upgrades his Kyutama into a Change Kyutama and gains the ability to transform into Ryu Commander (リュウコマンダー, Ryū Komandā). After traveling back in time to learn more about Don Armage, Shou remained in the past with Champ to ensure the Kyurangers assemble in the future before being put into cryogenic stasis inside the Battle Orion Ship, where his team finds him in the present. Following Don Armage's defeat, Shou becomes the supreme commander of the Rebellion and appoints Stinger as his successor.

Unlike the primary Kyurangers, Shou utilizes the Ryutsueider (リュウツエーダー, Ryūtsuēdā; Dragon Cane) staff, which can switch between Rod Mode (ロッドモード, Roddo Mōdo) and Rifle Mode (ライフルモード, Raifuru Mōdo), to transform into the "Dragon Ma-Star" (ドラゴンマスター, Doragon Masutā), Ryu Violet/Ryu Commander. His finishers are the Dragon Crush (ドラゴンクラッシュ, Doragon Kurasshu) on his own and the Kyuren All-Star Crash (キュウレンオールスタークラッシュ, Kyūren Ōru Sutā Kurasshu) alongside the primary Kyurangers and Koguma Skyblue. Shou's suit differs from the others in that it has gold lining and edging, is covered in a trenchcoat-like fabric, the star symbol on his chest is centralized rather than based over the left breast and is connected to black shoulder pads, and the belt is golden.

Shou Ronpo is voiced by Hiroshi Kamiya (神谷 浩史, Kamiya Hiroshi).

==== Kotaro Sakuma ====
Kotaro Sakuma (佐久間 小太郎, Sakuma Kotarō) is a young boy from Earth who lost his mother Akemi (暁美) to illness and took care of his younger brother Jiro on his own ever since. He first met the Kyurangers after he and Jiro were captured by Eriedrone and rescued by Stinger. Inspired by this, Kotaro decides to join the Rebellion, later gaining his own Change Kyutama from the spirit of Shou's predecessor, Big Bear, along with a Seiza Blaster for him to transform into Koguma Skyblue (コグマスカイブルー, Koguma Sukaiburū).

As the "Big Star" (ビッグスター, Biggu Sutā), Koguma Skyblue, Kotaro wields a scarf-like meteor hammer and his own Kyu Spear. His finishers are the Polaris Crush (ポラリスクラッシュ, Porarisu Kurasshu) via the Seiza Blaster and the Polaris Impact (ポラリスインパクト, Porarisu Inpakuto) via the Kyu Spear. Kotaro's suit differs from the others in that he wears a pair of mittens that hide claws and his helmet has bear ear-like protrusions.

Kotaro Sakuma is portrayed by Shota Taguchi (田口 翔大, Taguchi Shōta).

==== Tsurugi Ohtori ====
Tsurugi Ohtori (鳳 ツルギ, Ōtori Tsurugi) is the former head scientist of the Tsurugi Ohtori Science Laboratory (鳳ツルギ科学研究所, Ōtori Tsurugi Kagaku Kenkyūjo) from Earth three centuries prior to the series. After becoming the first human to travel into space, he obtained the Houou Kyutama, which granted him immortality, and united the universe as the first president of the Space Federation (宇宙連邦, Uchū Renpō). When Jark Matter was founded to destroy what he established, Tsurugi founded the Rebellion and the original Kyurangers, which he led alongside Orion. However, they faced heavy losses, forcing Tsurugi to sacrifice his immortality in an attempt to destroy Don Armage. When this failed, Orion placed Tsurugi in suspended animation within the spaceship Argo, split its Kyutama into the Ho, Ryukotsu and Tomo Kyutamas, and scattered them across the universe. In the present day, the Kyurangers reform the Argo Kyutama and revive Tsurugi, who discovers Jark Matter erased all records of his past achievements and the original Kyurangers from history before joining them in the fight against Don Armage. During the final battle, he ends up being possessed by Don Armage and forced to absorb Shou Ronpo. However, Lucky rescues them, leaving Don Armage hostless and vulnerable to the Kyurangers' combined powers. After Jark Matter's defeat, Tsurugi reassumes his position as president of the Space Federation.

Unlike the primary Kyurangers, Tsurugi utilizes the Houou Blade (ホウオウブレード, Hōō Burēdo) sword and the Houou Shield (ホウオウシールド, Hōō Shīrudo) to transform into the scarlet-colored "Space Bu-Star" (スペースバスター, Supēsu Basutā), Houou Soldier (ホウオウソルジャー, Hōō Sorujā). His finishers are the Phoenix End (フェニックスエンド, Fenikkusu Endo) on his own, the Double-Star Impact (ダブルスターインパクト, Daburu Sutā Inpakuto) alongside one other Kyuranger, and the Ultimate All-Star Crash (アルティメットオールスタークラッシュ, Arutimetto Ōru Sutā Kurasshu) alongside the primary and secondary Kyurangers. Tsurugi's suit differs from the others in that it is made of a leather-like fabric, has a collar that resembles the Kyutamas' base, and his helmet is equipped with a monaural headset.

Tsurugi Ohtori is portrayed by Keisuke Minami (南 圭介, Minami Keisuke).

=== Kyutamas ===
The Kyutamas (キュータマ, Kyūtama) are magical stones that give the Kyurangers their powers. Each of them are numbered and contain a power associated with a different constellation. They are usually stored in the Kyurangers' Kyu Buckle (キュウバックル, Kyū Bakkuru), or Ryu Buckle (リュウバックル, Ryū Bakkuru) in the case of Ryu Commander.

==== Change ====
The Change (チェンジ, Chenji) Kyutamas allow the Kyurangers to transform and pilot their Voyagers.

- 01. Shishi (シシ): Lucky's personal Leo-based Change Kyutama which allows him to transform into Shishi Red and pilot the Shishi Voyager.
- 02. Sasori (サソリ): Stinger's personal Scorpius-based Change Kyutama which allows him to transform into Sasori Orange and pilot the Sasori Voyager.
- 03. Ookami (オオカミ, Ōkami): Garu's personal Lupus-based Change Kyutama which allows him to transform into Ookami Blue and pilot the Ookami Voyager.
- 04. Tenbin (テンビン): Balance's personal Libra-based Change Kyutama which allows him to transform into Tenbin Gold and pilot the Tenbin Voyager.
- 05. Oushi (オウシ): Champ's personal Taurus-based Change Kyutama which allows him to transform into Oushi Black and pilot the Oushi Voyager.
- 06. Hebitsukai (ヘビツカイ): Naga's personal Ophiuchus-based Change Kyutama which allows him to transform into Hebitsukai Silver and pilot the Hebitsukai Voyager.
- 07. Chameleon (カメレオン, Kamereon): Hammie's personal Chamaeleon-based Change Kyutama which allows her to transform into Chameleon Green and pilot the Chameleon Voyager.
- 08. Washi (ワシ): Raptor's personal Aquila-based Change Kyutama which allows her to transform into Washi Pink and pilot the Washi Voyager.
- 09. Kajiki (カジキ): Spada's personal Dorado-based Change Kyutama which allows him to transform into Kajiki Yellow and pilot the Kajiki Voyager.
- 10. Ryu (リュウ, Ryū): Shou's personal Draco-based Change Kyutama which allows him to transform into Ryu Commander and pilot the Ryu Voyager. It was originally a Skill Kyutama that could only temporarily transform him into Ryu Violet until the other Kyurangers upgraded it using the energy of their Change Kyutamas.
- 11. Koguma (コグマ): Kotaro's personal Ursa Minor-based Change Kyutama which allows him to transform into Koguma Skyblue and pilot the Kuma Voyager. Big Bear created it from the Ooguma Kyutama.
- 12. Houou (ホウオウ, Hōō): Tsurugi's personal Phoenix-based Change Kyutama which allows him to transform into Houou Soldier and pilot the Houou Voyager. It also granted him the power of immortality, which he relinquished in order to defeat Don Armage 300 years prior.
- 315. Saiko (サイコー, Saikō): Lucky's secondary planetary system-based Change Kyutama which allows him to transform into Shishi Red Orion. It was created after Lucky traveled back in time and fought alongside Orion.

==== Skill ====
The Skill (スキル, Sukiru) Kyutamas either give extra powers to the Kyurangers or bring unusual effects that reflect a real-life basis.

- 13. Orion (オリオン): An Orion-based Skill Kyutama that is used to pilot the Orion Voyager and the Orion Battler. It was originally lost in the past until Lucky met Orion's spirit, who transforms his abandoned club into his Kyutama namesake.
- 14. Tokei (トケイ): A Horologium-based Skill Kyutama with the power to travel briefly to the past. The Kyurangers found it on Planet Toki (惑星トキ, Wakusei Toki) in the Horologium System (トケイ座系, Tokei-za-kei). Because of its large energy consumption, it can only be used twice before disappearing.
- 15. Ushikai (ウシカイ): A Boötes-based Skill Kyutama that increases the user's speed.
- 16. Hebi (ヘビ): A Serpens-based Skill Kyutama that creates multiple projections of snakes.
- 17. Pump (ポンプ, Ponpu): An Antlia-based Skill Kyutama that generates an energy pump.
- 18. Hercules (ヘラクレス, Herakuresu): A Hercules-based Skill Kyutama that increases the user's strength.
- 19. Rashinban (ラシンバン): A Pyxis-based Skill Kyutama that projects a holographic map for the user to locate the Argo's components. However, it takes time to recharge after it is used to find each of them. The Kyurangers found it on Planet Jiishakku (惑星ジーシャック, Wakusei Jīshakku) in the Pyxis System (ラシンバン座系, Rashinban-za-kei).
- 20. Bouenkyou (ボウエンキョウ, Bōenkyō): A Telescopium-based Skill Kyutama that projects a homing scope for the user to shoot from long distances.
- 21. Kani (カニ): A Cancer-based Skill Kyutama that generates an energy pincer on the user's hand.
- 22. Ooguma (オオグマ, Ōguma): An Ursa Major-based Skill Kyutama that allows Koguma Skyblue to become the giant-sized "Big Surprising Star" (ビッグサプライズイングスター, Biggu Sapuraizuingu Sutā), Ooguma Skyblue (オオグマスカイブルー, Ooguma Sukaiburū).
- 23. Uo (ウオ): A Pisces-based Skill Kyutama that materializes a large fish.
- 24. Tate (タテ): A Scutum-based Skill Kyutama that generates an energy shield.
- 25. Futago (フタゴ): A Gemini-based Skill Kyutama that creates duplicates of the user or anyone the user shoots.
- 26. Ohitsuji (オヒツジ): An Aries-based Skill Kyutama that puts anyone the user shoots to sleep.
- 27. Ikkakuju (イッカクジュウ, Ikkakujū): A Monoceros-based Skill Kyutama that allows Sasori Orange to become Sasori Orange Ikkakuju Arm (サソリオレンジイッカクジュウアーム, Sasori Orenji Ikkakujū Āmu) and perform the Unicorn Antares (ユニコーンアンタレス, Yunikōn Antaresu) finisher. It was created when Mika Retsu's energy was absorbed into an empty Kyutama following her death.
- 28. Mizugame (ミズガメ): An Aquarius-based Skill Kyutama that fires a stream of water.
- 29. Yagi (ヤギ): A Capricorn-based Skill Kyutama that records a video message for later reproduction.
- 30. Kanmuri (カンムリ): A Corona Borealis-based Skill Kyutama that materializes a crown.
- 31. Centaurus (ケンタウルス, Kentaurusu): A Centaurus-based Skill Kyutama.
- 32. Kujaku (クジャク): A Pavo-based Skill Kyutama.
- 33. Pegasus (ペガサス, Pegasasu): A Pegasus-based Skill Kyutama that summons Pega-san (ペガさん), a horse-themed sentient body armor who speaks in a Kansai accent, which a Kyuranger can combine with to become an armored Pegasus Kyuranger (ペガサスキュウレンジャー, Pegasasu Kyūrenjā), also known as the "Dancing Star" (ダンシングスター, Danshingu Sutā). Shishi Red primarily combines with Pega-san to become Pegasus Shishi Red (ペガサスシシレッド, Pegasasu Shishi Reddo), which allows him to perform the All-Star Pegasus Impact (オールスターペガサスインパクト, Ōru Sutā Pegasasu Inpakuto) finisher alongside the other Kyurangers. Kajiki Yellow can also combine with Pega-san to become the "Dancing Mei-Star" (ダンシングマイスター, Danshingu Maisutā), Pegasus Kajiki Yellow (ペガサスカジキイエロー, Pegasasu Kajiki Ierō). Pega-san is voiced by Masaki Terasoma (てらそま まさき, Terasoma Masaki).
- 34. Kaminoke (カミノケ): A Coma Berenices-based Skill Kyutama that gives people new hairstyles.
- 35. Ite (イテ): A Sagittarius-based Skill Kyutama that fires countless energy arrows.
- 36. Perseus (ペルセウス, Peruseusu): A Perseus-based Skill Kyutama that serves as one of the four components necessary to break Jark Matter's barrier protecting the Crux System. The Kyurangers created this Kyutama on Planet Geme (惑星ゲム, Wakusei Gemu) in the Perseus System.
- 37. Kujira (クジラ): A Cetus-based Skill Kyutama that fires a stream of water.
- 38. Cassiopeia (カシオペア, Kashiopea): A Cassiopeia-based Skill Kyutama that materializes a multicolored baseball-sized bomb used for a finisher and serves as one of the four components necessary to break Jark Matter's barrier protecting the Crux System. It was created when the Cassiopeia System's energy was absorbed into an empty Kyutama on Planet SBC (惑星SBC, Wakusei Esu Bī Shī) in the Cassiopeia System.
- 39. Tokage (トカゲ): A Lacerta-based Skill Kyutama that enables the user to climb on walls.
- 40. Andromeda (アンドロメダ, Andoromeda): An Andromeda-based Skill Kyutama that materializes chains and serves as one of the four components necessary to break Jark Matter's barrier protecting the Crux System.
- 41. Kenbikyou (ケンビキョウ, Kenbikyō): A Microscopium-based Skill Kyutama that grants the user microscopic vision. After Balance modified it, it can also shrink the user to microscopic size.
- 42. Ryouken (リョウケン, Ryōken): A Canes Venatici-based Skill Kyutama that increases the user's sense of smell.
- 43. Kirin (キリン): A Camelopardalis-based Skill Kyutama that elongates the user's neck.
- 44. Tobiuo (トビウオ): A Volans-based Skill Kyutama that increases the user's swimming capabilities.
- 45. Karasu (カラス): A Corvus-based Skill Kyutama that traps the target in a world of despair.
- 46. Jougi (ジョウギ, Jōgi): A Norma-based Skill Kyutama that materializes a ruler and a piece of chalk.
- 47. Choukokushitsu (チョウコクシツ, Chōkokushitsu): A Sculptor-based Skill Kyutama.
- 48. Iruka (イルカ): A Delphinus-based Skill Kyutama.
- 49. Compass (コンパス, Konpasu): A Circinus-based Skill Kyutama that materializes a chalkboard compass.
- 50. Saidan (サイダン): An Ara-based Skill Kyutama.
- 51. Otome (オトメ): A Virgo-based Skill Kyutama that increases the user's feminine qualities. If the user is male, it disguises them as a female.
- 52. Ooinu (オオイヌ, Ōinu): A Canis Major-based Skill Kyutama that grants the user a dog-based fighting style.
- 53. Sankaku (サンカク): A Triangulum-based Skill Kyutama.
- 54. Cepheus (ケフェウス, Kefeusu): A Cepheus-based Skill Kyutama that serves as one of the four components necessary to break Jark Matter's barrier protecting the Crux System. It was created when the Kyurangers visited the Kyulin Temple's Nine Chambers (九林寺九房, Kyūrin-ji Kyū-bō) on Planet Achoruku (惑星アチョルク, Wakusei Achoruku) in the Cepheus System and saved its great monk, who infused his energy into an empty Kyutama as a sign of gratitude.
- 55. Koto (コト): A Lyra-based Skill Kyutama that produces soothing music.
- 56. Hakuchou (ハクチョウ, Hakuchō): A Cygnus-based Skill Kyutama.
- 57. Hae (ハエ): A Musca-based Skill Kyutama.
- 58. Hato (ハト): A Columba-based Skill Kyutama that materializes a flight of doves.
- 59. Gaka (ガカ): A Pictor-based Skill Kyutama that increases the user's painting capabilities and grants them the ability to predict the intermediate future. Hoshi Minato originally had this before he gave it to Naga.
- 60. Eridanus (エリダヌス, Eridanusu): An Eridanus-based Skill Kyutama that generates a stream of water that reveals the target's true identity.
- 61. Kyoshichou (キョシチョウ, Kyoshichō): A Tucana-based Skill Kyutama.
- 62. Gyosha (ギョシャ): An Auriga-based Skill Kyutama that turns a target into a motorcycle for the user.
- 63. Kouma (コウマ): An Equuleus-based Skill Kyutama.
- 64. Cup (コップ, Koppu): A Crater-based Skill Kyutama that materializes several drinking glasses.
- 65. Mizuhebi (ミズヘビ): A Hydrus-based Skill Kyutama that grants the user a snake-based fighting style.
- 66. Koinu (コイヌ): A Canis Minor-based Skill Kyutama that causes the user to act like a playful puppy.
- 67. Umihebi (ウミヘビ): A Hydra-based Skill Kyutama.
- 68. Usagi (ウサギ): A Lepus-based Skill Kyutama that increases the user's jumping capabilities.
- 69. Choukokugu (チョウコクグ, Chōkokugu): A Caelum-based Skill Kyutama that generates an energy chisel.
- 70. Indian (インディアン): An Indus-based Skill Kyutama.
- 71. Table-san (テーブルサン, Tēburu-san): A Mensa-based Skill Kyutama.
- 72. Fuuchou (フウチョウ, Fūchō): An Apus-based Skill Kyutama that allows the user to move instantly from one place to another.
- 73. Minamijuji (ミナミジュウジ, Minamijūji): A Crux-based Skill Kyutama.
- 74. Minaminouo (ミナミノウオ): A Piscis Austrinus-based Skill Kyutama.
- 75. Minaminosankaku (ミナミノサンカク): A Triangulum Australe-based Skill Kyutama.
- 76. Minaminokanmuri (ミナミノカンムリ): A Corona Austrina-based Skill Kyutama.
- 77. Kojishi (コジシ): A Leo Minor-based Skill Kyutama used to summon the Kojishi Voyager.
- 78. Reticle (レチクル, Rechikuru): A Reticulum-based Skill Kyutama.
- 79. Rokubungi (ロクブンギ): A Sextans-based Skill Kyutama that materializes a sextant.
- 80. Hachibungi (ハチブンギ): An Octans-based Skill Kyutama that materializes an octant.
- 81. Tsuru (ツル): A Grus-based Skill Kyutama that grants the user a crane-based fighting style.
- 82. Kogitsune (コギツネ): A Vulpecula-based Skill Kyutama that allows the user to turn invisible.
- 83. Ro (ロ): A Fornax-based Skill Kyutama that materializes a campfire.
- 84. Ya (ヤ): A Sagitta-based Skill Kyutama that materializes baseball clothing and equipment.
- 85. Yamaneko (ヤマネコ): A Lynx-based Skill Kyutama that grants the user a cat-based fighting style.
- 86. Ho (ホ): A Vela-based Skill Kyutama that serves as one of the three components necessary to complete the Argo Kyutama. The Kyurangers found it on Planet Vela in the Vela System and received it from the planet's natives as a sign of gratitude.
- 87. Ryukotsu (リュウコツ, Ryūkotsu): A Carina-based Skill Kyutama that serves as one of the three components necessary to complete the Argo Kyutama. Scorpio temporarily stole it from Planet Keel in the Carina System before the Kyurangers eventually got it back.
- 88. Tomo (トモ): A Puppis-based Skill Kyutama that serves as one of the three components necessary to complete the Argo Kyutama. The Kyurangers found it within a Death Worm on Earth. While RyuteiOh got it out, the Kyutama fell into Ikargen's hands before the Kyurangers defeated him and reclaimed it.
- 89. Argo (アルゴ, Arugo): An Argo Navis-based Skill Kyutama that the Kyurangers obtained by assembling the Ho, Ryukotsu and Tomo Kyutamas. When used, it reveals the location of the Argo spaceship, where Tsurugi was put in a cryogenic sleep.
- 111. Cerberus (ケルベロス, Keruberosu): A Cerberus-based Skill Kyutama used to summon the Cerberus Voyager. It was created when the Shishi Kyutama Cockpit combined with the Cerberus Voyager.

==== Special ====
These unique Kyutamas possess exclusive attributes. Unlike the Change and Skill Kyutamas, they are inscribed with letters instead of numbers.

- KR. Ex-Aid (エグゼイド, Eguzeido): A Kamen Rider-based Kyutama that for one use only summons Kamen Rider Ex-Aid.
- SP. All Voyager (オールボイジャー, Ōru Boijā): A Kyutama that is used to summon all of the Kyurangers' Voyagers at once.
- SP. Kyuranger (キュウレンジャー, Kyūrenjā): A Kyutama whose power is unknown, but is placed in the Kyulette along with the Change Kyutamas. When chosen, it indicates that all of the Kyurangers must be deployed for the mission.
- SUN/MOON. Hikari (ヒカリ): A two-sided Kyutama that allows a Kyuranger, primarily Shishi Red, to upgrade their form and perform the Taiyou Moon Crash (タイヨウ・ムーンクラッシュ, Taiyō Mūn Kurasshu) finisher. It can also be used as a flashlight.
  - Taiyou Mode (タイヨウモード, Taiyō Mōdo): The Hikari Kyutama's Sun-based half that allows a Kyuranger to become an energetic Taiyou Kyuranger (タイヨウキュウレンジャー, Taiyō Kyūrenjā), also known as the "Shining Star" (シャイニングスター, Shainingu Sutā), where they gain the ability to emit a sunlight-like flash that can increase Tenbin Gold's speed and agility to grant him a rapid-fire fighting style. Shishi Red and Chameleon Green use this half to become Taiyou Shishi Red (タイヨウシシレッド, Taiyō Shishi Reddo) and Taiyou Chameleon Green (タイヨウカメレオングリーン, Taiyō Kamereon Gurīn), respectively.
  - Tsuki Mode (ツキモード, Tsuki Mōdo): The Hikari Kyutama's Moon-based half that allows a Kyuranger to become a reserved Kyuranger Moon (キュウレンジャームーン, Kyūrenjā Mūn), also known as the "Moody Star" (ムーディースター, Mūdī Sutā), where they gain the ability to emit a moonlight-like flash that can increase Ookami Blue's intelligence to grant him a swift and elegant fighting style. Shishi Red and Chameleon Green use this half to become Shishi Red Moon (シシレッドムーン, Shishi Reddo Mūn) and Chameleon Green Moon (カメレオングリーンムーン, Kamereon Gurīn Mūn), respectively.
- Xmas. Christmas (クリスマス, Kurisumasu): A holiday-based Kyutama that materializes Christmas decorations.

==== Dark ====
These corrupted versions of the Kyutamas inscribed with the Jark Matter emblem were given to Naga Ray at the time of his brainwashing by Akyanba. Naga kept these Kyutamas after he was purified from his brainwashing.

- Dark (ダーク, Dāku): Dark Naga's personal Change Kyutama which allows him to transform into Hebitsukai Metal.
- Black Hole (ブラックホール, Burakku Hōru): A Skill Kyutama that allows Hebitsukai Metal to perform the Metal Ophiuchus Crush (メタルオフューカスクラッシュ, Metaru Ofyūkasu Kurasshu) finisher. It was later converted into a Black Hole Generator (ブラックホール発生装置, Burakku Hōru Hassei Sōchi) to prevent Don Armage's Planedium Bomb from destroying the universe.

=== Voyagers ===
The Voyagers (ボイジャー, Boijā) are the Kyurangers' mecha that are each associated with one of the Kyutamas. They also each possess a Kyutama Cockpit (キュータマコクピット, Kyūtama Kokupitto). The Voyagers were originally stored within the Orion until it was destroyed and they were transferred to the Battle Orion Ship.

- Shishi Voyager (シシボイジャー, Shishi Boijā): Shishi Red's personal Leo-themed Voyager.
- Sasori Voyager (サソリボイジャー, Sasori Boijā): Sasori Orange's personal Scorpius-themed Voyager.
- Ookami Voyager (オオカミボイジャー, Ōkami Boijā): Ookami Blue's personal Lupus-themed Voyager.
- Tenbin Voyager (テンビンボイジャー, Tenbin Boijā): Tenbin Gold's personal Libra-themed Voyager that can perform the Happy Splash (ハッピースプラッシュ, Happī Supurasshu) attack alongside the Hebitsukai Voyager.
- Oushi Voyager (オウシボイジャー, Oushi Boijā): Oushi Black's personal Taurus-themed Voyager.
- Hebitsukai Voyager (ヘビツカイボイジャー, Hebitsukai Boijā): Hebitsukai Silver's personal Ophiuchus-themed Voyager that can perform the Happy Splash alongside the Libra Voyager.
- Chameleon Voyager (カメレオンボイジャー, Kamereon Boijā): Chameleon Green's personal Chamaeleon-themed Voyager.
- Washi Voyager (ワシボイジャー, Washi Boijā): Washi Pink's personal Aquila-themed Voyager.
- Kajiki Voyager (カジキボイジャー, Kajiki Boijā): Kajiki Yellow's personal Dorado-themed Voyager.
- Ryu Voyager (リュウボイジャー, Ryū Boijā): Ryu Commander's personal Draco-themed Voyager. Its finisher is the Dragon Break (ドラゴンブレイク, Doragon Bureiku). In episode 9, the Ryu Voyager is voiced by Hiroshi Kamiya.
- Kuma Voyager (クマボイジャー, Kuma Boijā): Koguma Skyblue's personal two-in-one Voyager composed of the Ursa Major-themed Ooguma Voyager (オオグマボイジャー, Ōguma Boijā) and the Ursa Minor-themed Koguma Voyager (コグマボイジャー, Koguma Boijā).
- Houou Voyager (ホウオウボイジャー, Hōō Boijā): Houou Soldier's personal Phoenix-themed Voyager.
  - Houou Station (ホウオウステーション, Hōō Sutēshon): A satellite-like structure.
  - Houou Base (ホウオウベース, Hōō Bēsu): The Houou Voyager's self-propelled launch pad where the former is stored between missions.
- Battle Orion Ship (バトルオリオンシップ, Batoru Orion Shippu): A giant space battleship that becomes the Kyurangers' base of operations after the Orion's destruction, which Orion created to be the ultimate weapon against Jark Matter. It can also transform into the Orion Bazooka (オリオンバズーカ, Orion Bazuuka) and be used by the Kyurangers' giant robots to perform the Orion Big Bang Cannon (オリオンビッグバンキャノン, Orion Biggu Ban Kyanon) finisher.
  - Orion Voyager (オリオンボイジャー, Orion Boijā): Shishi Red Orion's personal club-themed Voyager that is part of the Battle Orion Ship.
- Kojishi Voyager (コジシボイジャー, Kojishi Boijā): Shishi Red's secondary Leo Minor-themed Voyager that can combine with the Shishi Voyager to form the Super Shishi Voyager (スーパーシシボイジャー, Sūpā Shishi Boijā). It is normally in a palm-sized form until it is enlarged via the Kojishi Kyutama. Lucky nicknamed it "Caesar" (シーザー, Shīzā) when he was a child after his father gave it to him, and Garu is able to communicate with it.
- Cerberus Voyager (ケルベロスボイジャー, Keruberosu Boijā): A namesake-themed Voyager that appears exclusively in the film Uchu Sentai Kyuranger the Movie: Geth Indaver Strikes Back. Originally known as the Cosmic Destroyer Cerberus (宇宙の破壊神ケルベロス, Uchū no Hakaishin Keruberosu) because it possessed the power to destroy planets, the Cerberus Stone (ケルベロスストーン, Keruberosu Sutōn) needed to summon it was split into three fragments hidden on the Planets Dober (ドーベル, Dōberu), Husky (ハスキー, Hasukī), and Bull (ブル, Buru) in the dangerous Cerberus System (ケルベロス座系, Keruberosu-za-kei). Geth Indaver manages to summon Cerberus before the Kyurangers pacify it and turn it into a Voyager to destroy his Geth Star. Following the battle, the Cerberus Stone fragments returned to their respective planets.

==== Kyutama Combinations ====
The Voyagers can be assembled into giant robots via Kyutama Combination (キュータマ合体, Kyūtama Gattai).

- KyurenOh (キュウレンオー, Kyūrenō): The Kyurangers' first giant robot composed of the Shishi Voyager and four other Voyagers. As each Voyager possesses a specific ability, the myriad number of possible combinations give KyurenOh flexibility in combat along with a unique variation of its finisher.
  - KyurenOh (01-03-05-07-09): The primary arrangement composed of the Shishi, Ookami, Oushi, Chameleon, and Kajiki Voyagers. Its finisher is the KyurenOh: Star Break (キュウレンオー・スターブレイク, Kyūrenō Sutā Bureiku).
  - KyurenOh (01-02-04-06-08): The secondary arrangement composed of the Shishi, Sasori, Tenbin, Hebitsukai, and Washi Voyagers. This arrangement appears exclusively in the crossover film Kamen Rider × Super Sentai: Ultra Super Hero Taisen.
  - KyurenOh (01-03-04-05-06): An alternate arrangement composed of the Shishi, Ookami, Tenbin, Oushi, and Hebitsukai Voyagers. Its finisher is the KyurenOh: Trick Break (キュウレンオー・トリックブレイク, Kyūrenō Torikku Bureiku).
  - KyurenOh (01-03-06-07-09): An alternate arrangement composed of the Shishi, Ookami, Hebitsukai, Chameleon, and Kajiki Voyagers. Its finisher is the KyurenOh: Meteor Break (キュウレンオー・メテオブレイク, Kyūrenō Meteo Bureiku).
  - KyurenOh (01-03-05-08-09): An alternate arrangement composed of the Shishi, Ookami, Oushi, Washi, and Kajiki Voyagers. Its finisher is the KyurenOh: Meteor Break.
  - KyurenOh (01-04-06-08-09): An alternate arrangement composed of the Shishi, Tenbin, Hebitsukai, Washi, and Kajiki Voyagers. Its finishers are the KyurenOh: Meteor Break, KyurenOh: Star Break, and KyurenOh: All-Star Break (キュウレンオー・オールスターブレイク, Kyūrenō Ōru Sutā Bureiku).
  - KyurenOh (01-02-03-05-07): An alternate arrangement composed of the Shishi, Sasori, Ookami, Oushi, and Chameleon Voyagers. Its finisher is the KyurenOh: Super Meteor Break (キュウレンオー・スーパーメテオブレイク, Kyūrenō Sūpā Meteo Bureiku), which is performed with the other four Voyagers.
  - KyurenOh (01-03-04-07-09): An alternate arrangement composed of the Shishi, Ookami, Tenbin, Chameleon, and Kajiki Voyagers. Its finisher is the KyurenOh: Pegasus Break (キュウレンオー・ペガサスブレイク, Kyūrenō Pegasasu Bureiku) with the Pegasus Kyutama's power.
  - KyurenOh (01-02-04-06-07): An alternate arrangement composed of the Shishi, Sasori, Tenbin, Hebitsukai, and Chameleon Voyagers.
  - KyurenOh (01-02-03-07-08): An alternate arrangement composed of the Shishi, Sasori, Ookami, Chameleon, and Washi Voyagers. Its finisher is the KyurenOh: Meteor Break.
  - KyurenOh (01-02-07-08-09): An alternate arrangement composed of the Shishi, Sasori, Chameleon, Washi, and Kajiki Voyagers. Its finisher is the Dragon Meteor Break (ドラゴンメテオブレイク, Doragon Meteo Bureiku) alongside the Ryu Voyager.
  - KyurenOh (01-02-03-05-11): An alternate arrangement composed of the Shishi, Sasori, Ookami, Oushi, and Kuma Voyagers.
  - KyurenOh (01-06-07-08-09): An alternate arrangement composed of the Shishi, Hebitsukai, Chameleon, Washi, and Kajiki Voyagers. Its finisher is the KyurenOh: Meteor Break.
  - KyurenOh (01-04-06-07-09): An alternate arrangement composed of the Shishi, Tenbin, Hebitsukai, Chameleon, and Kajiki Voyagers. Its finisher is the KyurenOh: Meteor Break.
  - KyurenOh (01-03-07-08-09): An alternate arrangement composed of the Shishi, Ookami, Chameleon, Washi, and Kajiki Voyagers. Its finisher is the KyurenOh: Meteor Break.
  - KyurenOh (01-03-06-07-08-09): An alternate arrangement composed of the Shishi, Ookami, Hebitsukai, Chameleon, Washi, and Kajiki Voyagers.
  - KyurenOh (01-02-07-09-11): An alternate arrangement composed of the Shishi, Sasori, Chameleon, Kajiki, and Kuma Voyagers. Its finisher is the Triple Meteor Break (トリプルメテオブレイク, Toripuru Meteo Bureiku) alongside RyuteiOh and Gigant Houoh.
  - KyurenOh (01-03-03-07-07): An alternate arrangement composed of the Shishi Voyager and two copies of the Ookami and Chameleon Voyagers each via the Futago Kyutama. Its finisher is the KyurenOh: Twin Break (キュウレンオー・ツインブレイク, Kyūrenō Tsuin Bureiku).
  - KyurenOh (01-02-05-08-09): An alternate arrangement composed of the Shishi, Sasori, Oushi, Washi, and Kajiki Voyagers. Its finisher is the KyurenOh: Meteor Break.
  - KyurenOh (01-02-05-07-09): An alternate arrangement composed of the Shishi, Sasori, Oushi, Chameleon, and Kajiki Voyagers.
  - KyurenOh (01-06-07-09-11): An alternate arrangement composed of the Shishi, Hebitsukai, Chameleon, Kajiki, and Kuma Voyagers. Its finisher is the KyurenOh: Meteor Break.
  - KyurenOh (04-06-09-11-77): An alternate arrangement composed of the Shishi, Tenbin, Hebitsukai, Kajiki, and Kuma Voyagers. Unlike the other KyurenOh arrangements, the Kojishi Kyutama Cockpit replaces the Shishi Kyutama Cockpit in this combination.
  - KyurenOh (01-04-05-07-09): An alternate arrangement composed of the Shishi, Tenbin, Oushi, Chameleon, and Kajiki Voyagers. Its finisher is the Triple Meteor Break alongside RyuteiOh and Gigant Houoh.
  - KyurenOh (01-02-04-05-06): An alternate arrangement composed of the Shishi, Sasori, Tenbin, Oushi, and Hebitsukai Voyagers.
- RyuteiOh (リュウテイオー, Ryūteiō): The Kyurangers' second giant robot composed of the Ryu Voyager and two other Voyagers.
  - RyuteiOh (02-10-11): The default arrangement composed of the Sasori, Ryu, and Kuma Voyagers. Its finishers are the RyuteiOh: Meteor Break (リュウテイオー・メテオブレイク, Ryūteiō Meteo Bureiku) on its own and the Triple Meteor Break alongside KyurenOh and Gigant Houou.
  - RyuteiOh (07-09-10): An alternate arrangement composed of the Chameleon, Kajiki, and Ryu Voyagers. Its finisher is the RyuteiOh: Meteor Break.
  - RyuteiOh (04-06-10): An alternate arrangement composed of the Tenbin, Hebitsukai, and Ryu Voyagers. Its finisher is the RyuteiOh: Meteor Break.
  - RyuteiOh (03-04-10): An alternate arrangement composed of the Ookami, Tenbin, and Ryu Voyagers. Its finisher is the RyuteiOh: Meteor Break.
  - RyuteiOh (03-07-10): An alternate arrangement composed of the Ookami, Chameleon, and Ryu Voyagers.
  - RyuteiOh (06-10-11): An alternate arrangement composed of the Hebitsukai, Ryu, and Kuma Voyagers. Its finisher is the RyuteiOh: Meteor Break.
  - RyuteiOh (03-05-10): An alternate arrangement composed of the Ookami, Oushi, and Ryu Voyagers. Its finisher is the Triple Meteor Break alongside KyurenOh and Gigant Houou.
  - RyuteiOh (08-09-10): An alternate arrangement composed of the Washi, Kajiki, and Ryu Voyagers. Its finisher is the RyuteiOh: Meteor Break.
  - RyuteiOh (03-06-10): An alternate arrangement composed of the Ookami, Hebitsukai, and Ryu Voyagers.
  - RyuteiOh (07-08-10): An alternate arrangement composed of the Chameleon, Washi, and Ryu Voyagers.
  - RyuteiOh (03-06-07-08-10): An alternate arrangement composed of the Ookami, Hebitsukai, Chameleon, and Washi Kyutama Cockpits, the Ryu Voyager, and the Houou Voyager's rockets. Its finisher is the RyuteiOh: Meteor Kick (リュウテイオー・メテオキック, Ryūteiō Meteo Kikku).
  - RyuteiOh (03-08-10): An alternate arrangement composed of the Ookami, Washi, and Ryu Voyagers. Its finisher is the RyuteiOh: Meteor Break.
- Ryutei KyurenOh (リュウテイキュウレンオー, Ryūtei Kyūrenō): A combination of the Shishi Voyager, the Ryu Voyager, and six other Voyagers. Its finisher is the All-Star Scramble Break (オールスタースクランブルブレイク, Ōru Sutā Sukuranburu Bureiku).
  - Ryutei KyurenOh (01-02-03-05-07-09-10-11): The default arrangement composed of the Shishi, Sasori, Ookami, Oushi, Chameleon, Kajiki, Ryu, and Kuma Voyagers.
  - Ryutei KyurenOh (01-02-04-05-07-09-10-11): An alternate arrangement composed of the Shishi, Sasori, Tenbin, Oushi, Chameleon, Kajiki, Ryu, and Kuma Voyagers.
- Gigant Houoh (ギガントホウオー, Giganto Hōō): Houou Soldier's personal giant robot composed of the Houou Voyager and Station that dual wields the twin Gigant Blade (ギガントブレード, Giganto Burēdo) swords. Its finishers are the Gigant Houoh Blazing (ギガントホウオーブレイジング, Giganto Hōō Bureijingu) and the Gigant Fire Break (ギガントファイヤーブレイク, Giganto Faiyā Bureiku) on its own and the Triple Meteor Break alongside KyurenOh and RyuTeiOh.
- Kyutamajin (キュータマジン, Kyūtamajin): The Great Kyutama Combination (キュータマ大合体, Kyūtama Dai Gattai) of Gigant Houou, the Shishi Voyager, the Sasori, Ookami, Tenbin, Oushi, Hebitsukai, Chameleon, Washi, Kajiki, Ryu, and Koguma Kyutama Cockpits, and the Houou Base. Its finishers are the Kyutamajin: Meteor Booster (キュータマジン・メテオブースター, Kyūtamajin Meteo Būsutā) and the Ultimate Meteor Break (アルティメットメテオブレイク, Arutimetto Meteo Bureiku). During the final battle, Kyutamajin uses a new finisher called the Ultimate All-Star Break (アルティメットオールスターブレイク, Arutimetto Ōru Sutā Bureiku).
- Orion Battler (オリオンバトラー, Orion Batorā): The Kyurangers' third giant robot composed of the Battle Orion Ship and the Orion Voyager. Although usually piloted by Shishi Red Orion, it can operate independently to support the Kyurangers in battle. Its finisher is the Orion Dynamic Strike (オリオンダイナミックストライク, Orion Dainamikku Sutoraiku).
- Super KyurenOh (スーパーキュウレンオー, Sūpā Kyūrenō): The Kyurangers' fourth giant robot composed of the Super Shishi Voyager, the Kajiki Voyager, and three other Voyagers that wields a giant cannon, which can assume Rush Mode (ラッシュモード, Rasshu Mōdo) to shoot multiple enemies in rapid succession.
  - Super KyurenOh (03-05-07-09-77): The default arrangement composed of the Ookami, Oushi, Chameleon, Kajiki, and Super Shishi Voyagers. Its finisher is the Super KyurenOh: Final Break (スーパーキュウレンオー・ファイナルブレイク, Sūpā Kyūrenō Fainaru Bureiku).
  - Super KyurenOh (03-04-06-09-77): An alternate arrangement composed of the Ookami, Tenbin, Hebitsukai, Kajiki, and Super Shishi Voyagers.
  - Super KyurenOh (04-06-09-11-77): An alternate arrangement composed of the Tenbin, Hebitsukai, Kajiki, Kuma, and Super Shishi Voyagers. Its finisher is the Super KyurenOh: Final Break.
  - Super KyurenOh (02-05-09-11-77): An alternate arrangement composed of the Sasori, Oushi, Kajiki, Kuma, and Super Shishi Voyagers. Its finisher is the Super KyurenOh: Final Break.
  - Super KyurenOh (02-05-07-09-77): An alternate arrangement composed of the Sasori, Oushi, Chameleon, Kajiki, and Super Shishi Voyagers. Its finisher is the Super KyurenOh: Final Break.
  - Super KyurenOh (02-06-07-09-77): An alternate arrangement composed of the Sasori, Hebitsukai, Chameleon, Kajiki, and Super Shishi Voyagers.
  - Super KyurenOh (02-07-09-11-77): An alternate arrangement composed of the Sasori, Chameleon, Kajiki, Kuma, and Super Shishi Voyagers. Its finisher is the Super KyurenOh: Pegasus Break (スーパーキュウレンオー・ペガサスブレイク, Sūpā Kyūrenō Pegasasu Bureiku) with the Pegasus Kyutama's power.
  - Super KyurenOh (04-05-07-09-77): An alternate arrangement composed of the Tenbin, Oushi, Chameleon, Kajiki, and Super Shishi Voyagers. Its finisher is the Super KyurenOh: Final Break.
- Cerberios (ケルベリオス, Keruberiosu): A combination of the Cerberus, Oushi, Hebitsukai, Chameleon, and Kajiki Voyagers that possesses the ability to temporarily enlarge itself via the power of the Hikari Kyutama's Tsuki Mode. Its finisher is the Cerberios: Final Break (ケルべリオス・ファイナルブレイク, Keruberiosu Fainaru Bureiku). This combination appears exclusively in the film Uchu Sentai Kyuranger the Movie: Geth Indaver Strikes Back.

== Recurring characters ==
=== Jark Matter ===
The Space Shogunate Jark Matter (宇宙幕府ジャークマター, Uchū Bakufu Jāku Matā) is an organization of aliens that have conquered an untold number of planets, including Planet Earth (惑星チキュウ, Wakusei Chikyū) and the 88 constellations that surround it, with the goal of gathering Planedium (プラネジューム, Puranejūmu), the planets' core energy, for a Planedium Bomb (プラネジューム爆弾, Puranejūmu Bakudan) so they can destroy the entire universe. Their base of operations is located in the Crux System (ミナミジュウジ座系, Minamijūji-za-kei), which is protected by an invisible barrier and heavily guarded.

==== Don Armage ====
Don Armage (ドン・アルマゲ, Don Arumage) is the deformed skull-themed leader, or Shogun (ショーグン, Shōgun), of Jark Matter who was born from the collective despair of all life in the universe. Revealing himself when Tsurugi united the universe 300 years prior, Armage established Jark Matter to destroy everything Tsurugi had built to thrive on the resulting misery, increase his power, and become a god. He was seemingly killed while battling Tsurugi, but Armage survived by possessing Tsurugi's ally Cuervo and retaliates by conquering Earth along with erasing records of Tsurugi and his comrades' achievements. Leading Jark Matter for the next 333 years, he oversaw his campaign via holograms from Planet Southern Cross (惑星サザンクロス, Wakusei Sazan Kurosu) in the Crux System, which he also used as a test site for his Planedium Bomb.

After the Kyurangers weakened his forces and destroyed his Planedium Bomb, Don Armage confronted them on Earth, where Cuervo expelled him and forced him to take Tsurugi as his new host, Don Tsurugi (ドン・ツルギ), in an attempt to harness Dark Planedium (ダークプラネジューム, Dāku Puranejūmu) energy until the Kyurangers rescue their ally. Taking on his natural form, he converts every living being in the universe besides himself and the Kyurangers into Planedium energy and absorbs them to assume a new form, but the Kyurangers are able to release them as well, defeating him in the process. In a last-ditch attempt at cheating death, Don Armage implanted a fragment of himself inside Lucky's body in the hopes of eventually resurrecting himself, but this plan backfires and the fragment is forced back into his original body before the Kyurangers permanently finish him off.

Don Armage is capable of possessing others and using their abilities, producing clones, transmit his energy through his holograms, and impart fragments of his essence into others to transform them into monsters. In combat, he and his clones wield the Dark Scythe (ダークサイズ, Dāku Saizu) and the Houou Dark Scythe (ホウオウダークサイズ, Hōō Dāku Saizu) while possessing Tsurugi.

Don Armage is voiced by Atsuki Tani (谷 昌樹, Tani Atsuki).

==== Cuervo ====
Cuervo (クエルボ, Kuerubo) is a crow-like alien and former prisoner of Jark Matter's boot camp from Planet Verona (惑星ベローナ, Wakusei Berōna) in the Corvus System (カラス座系, Karasu-za-kei). Three centuries prior, he helped his fellow prisoners escape and was recruited by Tsurugi to become his partner and a member of the original Rebellion before joining him in recruiting 86 other warriors to overthrow Jark Matter. During what appeared to be the final battle against Don Armage, Cuervo seemingly sacrificed himself to save Tsurugi. In reality, he sold his soul to the tyrant in exchange for his life, became his host, and was reborn as Don Armage's thrall, the Hindu cosmology-themed Don Cuervo (ドン・クエルボ, Don Kuerubo); loyally serving him from then on.

While Jark Matter was commencing their final experiments on Dark Planedium on Planet Southern Cross, Cuervo revealed himself to Tsurugi when he and the Kyurangers came to destroy the Planedium Bomb. During the Kyurangers' final battle against Don Armage on Earth, Cuervo revealed he had subverted Armage's will, but willingly helped him in his plans so he could see the destroyed universe recreated as a utopia. However, Don Armage was extracted from his body and he was killed by Tsurugi.

As one of the 88 legendary saviors, Cuervo dual wields a pair of sai and is clad in a heliocentrism-themed chest armor. As Don Cuervo, he dual wields the twin Armaken (アルマ剣, Arumaken) swords.

Cuervo is voiced by Daisuke Namikawa (浪川 大輔, Namikawa Daisuke). As Don Cuervo, his voice is blended together with Atsuki Tani, Don Armage's voice actor.

==== Vice Shoguns ====
The Vice Shoguns (フクショーグン, Fuku Shōgun) are the second-highest-ranking members of Jark Matter, serving directly under the Shogun and answering only to him. Instead of a Kyodainro, each of them carry a golden dragon pad on the right shoulder that allows them to enlarge and shrink back to normal size. They were among the organization's original members three centuries prior, having battled the original Rebellion members, and were later converted into cyborgs by Doctor Anton to prolong their lives. Following the Fuku Shoguns' defeat, Doctor Anton gathers their remains and combines them to create the three-headed Bermuda Triangle-themed Akyachuga (アキャチューガ, Akyachūga), who wields all of the original Fuku Shoguns' weapons and can perform the Vacuum Triangle (バキュームトライアングル, Bakyūmu Toraianguru) attack. An enlarged Akyachuga is sent to defend Planet Southern Cross' core against the Kyurangers before being destroyed by KyurenOh (01-02-03-05-11), RyuteiOh (07-09-10), and Gigant Houoh using the Battle Orion Ship in its cannon mode.

===== Tetchu =====
Tetchu (テッチュウ, Tetchū) is a Vice Shogun from Planet Sabinain (惑星サビナイン, Wakusei Sabinain) in the Cepheus System (ケフェウス座系, Kefeusu-za-kei). Initially a hand-to-hand fighter in the past, his cyborg modifications equips him with the Tekkyu (テッキュウ, Tekkyū) flail on his left arm. He is eventually defeated by the Kyurangers on Planet Toki and destroyed by Kyutamajin.

Tetchu is voiced by Hiroshi Tsuchida (土田 大, Tsuchida Hiroshi).

===== Akyanba =====
Akyanba (アキャンバー, Akyanbā) is a Vice Shogun from Planet Kyoryudo (惑星キョリュード, Wakusei Kyoryūdo) in the Cassiopeia System (カシオペア座系, Kashiopea-za-kei). She wields the Re-break Mic (再ブレイクマイク, Sai Bureiku Maiku) microphone, an upgraded version of the Break Mic (ブレイクマイク, Bureiku Maiku) she previously wielded in the past. Following Tetchu's death, Akyanba is sent to eliminate the Kyurangers by unlocking Naga's emotions, with the aid of Micro Tsuyoindaver. However, Naga is eventually freed from her control and leads the Kyurangers in destroying Akyanba.

Akyanba is voiced by Arisa Komiya (小宮 有紗, Komiya Arisa) while her humanoid form is portrayed by Yuri Hori (堀 有里, Hori Yuri).

===== Kukuruga =====
Kukuruga (ククルーガ, Kukurūga) is a Vice Shogun from Planet Quetzalco (惑星ケツァルコ, Wakusei Ketsaruko) in the Perseus System (ペルセウス座系, Peruseusu-za-kei). He oversaw the conquest of Planet Kaien and seemingly killed King Aslan while his son Lucky was spirited away and hidden in the Leo Minor System. In reality, he ensured Aslan's downfall and contributed to turning him into one of Don Armage's thralls. Originally wielding the Medusaber (メドウサーベル, Medōsāberu) saber when Jark Matter was founded, Kukulga has his left arm outfitted with the Kukulgun (ククルガン, Kukurugan) cannon by the present. While supporting Akyanba following Tetchu's death, Kukulga took an interest in Lucky as a result of the youth traveling back in time and defeating his past self. Kukulga later fights Shishi Red Orion on Planet Kaien, where his scheme is exposed. Upon being defeated by Shishi Red Orion and the Kyurangers, Kukulga enlarges and is destroyed by Super KyurenOh (04-06-09-11-77) and Orion Battler.

Kukulga is voiced by Naoya Uchida (内田 直哉, Uchida Naoya).

====== Aides ======
- Gyabura (ギャブラー, Gyaburā): Tetchu's aide from Planet Chuppa (惑星チュッパ, Wakusei Chuppa) in the Capricornus System (ヤギ座系, Yagi-za-kei) who possesses Chupacazura (チュパカヅラ) hair and wields the Chupacablance (チュパカブランス, Chupakaburansu) lance. After being defeated by Shishi Red and Houou Soldier, Gyabura is enlarged and killed by Kyutamajin. Gyabura is voiced by Mitsuru Ogata (小形 満, Ogata Mitsuru).
- Dogyun (ドーギュン, Dōgyun): Kukuruga's aide from Planet Shakoki (惑星シャコキ, Wakusei Shakoki) in the Sculptor System (チョウコクシツ座系, Chōkokushitsu-za-kei) who wields the Liquid Organism Matrix (液状生命体マトリック, Ekijō Seimeitai Matorikku) and the Kogyun Box (コーギュン箱, Kōgyun Bako). After being defeated by Shishi Red Orion, Sasori Orange, Ookami Blue, Hebitsukai Silver, Chameleon Green, Washi Pink, and Houou Soldier, Dogyun is enlarged and creates a Super Big Morimers (スーパービッグモライマーズ, Sūpā Biggu Moraimāzu) before he is killed by Kyutamajin. Dogyun is voiced by Kiyomitsu Mizuuchi (水内 清光, Mizuuchi Kiyomitsu).

==== Doctor Anton ====
Doctor Anton (アントン博士, Anton-hakase) is a scientist who once worked for Jark Matter for several centuries, gradually turning himself into a cyborg to prolong his life. Anton also suffered from dissociative identity disorder before his evil persona transferred itself into a receptacle called the Anton Brain (アントンブレイン, Anton Burein) to stop his good self's ethical meddling and life. This resulted in Anton being able to act independently of his evil-half, allowing him to leave Jark Matter to prevent the newly built Champ from being used for evil and teach his creation to value all forms of life. The good Anton is later murdered by Scorpio while his evil counterpart works for Jark Matter unopposed and transforms a majority of its high-ranking members into cyborgs.

The evil Anton eventually reveals himself to the Kyurangers during their quest to access the Crux System. With Mecha Mardakko's help, he kidnaps Champ and restores his prime directive as a war machine before Stinger destroyed the berserker chip, freeing his ally from the Anton Brain's control. Following the destruction of Planet Southern Cross, the evil Anton flees and installs himself into a Zero unit to regain full mobility as the tesla coil-themed Anton Zero (アントンゼロ, Anton Zero). However, he is defeated by Shishi Red, Sasori Orange, Tenbin Gold, Oushi Black, Hebitsukai Silver, and Koguma Skyblue. Upon being enlarged, he is destroyed by KyurenOh (01-02-04-05-06) and Orion Battler.

Doctor Anton is portrayed by Tsuyoshi Ujiki (うじき つよし, Ujiki Tsuyoshi).

===== Zero =====
The Cow-Type All-Purpose Weapon Zero (牛型汎用破壊兵器ゼロ号, Ushi-gata Hanyō Hakai Heiki Zero-gō) androids are creations of Doctor Anton that resemble skeletal versions of Champ outfitted with the 180mm Bull Cannon (180mm猛牛火呑, Hyakuhachijū-miri-mētoru Mōgyū Kanon), the 30mm Bull Machine Gun (30mm猛牛魔震貫, Sanjū-miri-mētoru Mōgyū Mashin Gan), and the Bull Boomerang (猛牛風米嵐, Mōgyū Būmeran). The first Zero unit is created by Akyanba and Kukuruga using blueprints Doctor Anton left behind in a scheme to destroy the Kyurangers. While originally identical to Champ, the android's casing is destroyed by the real Champ to reveal its true appearance. Though it is defeated by the Kyurangers, the Zero unit is enlarged before being destroyed by KyurenOh (01-02-03-05-11), RyuteiOh (07-09-10), and Gigant Houoh using the Battle Orion Ship in its cannon mode. Following this, Jark Matter mass-produced Zero and employed them on several occasions against the Kyurangers.

==== Karos ====
The Karos (カロー, Karō) are elite members responsible for controlling conquered star systems. Each Karo has a customized space battleship known as Big Morimers (ビッグモライマーズ, Biggu Moraimāzu).

===== Eriedrone =====
Eriedrone (エリードロン, Erīdoron) is the Karo of the Sagittarius System (イテ座系, Ite-za-kei) who hails from Planet Ojikazo (惑星オジカゾ, Wakusei Ojikazo) and wields the Electlong Bow (エレクトロングボウ, Erekutorongu Bō), which doubles as a spear. After being ordered by Don Armage to eliminate the Kyurangers, he pursued them across the galaxy until they reached Earth, where he is killed in his Big Morimers after it is destroyed by KyurenOh (01-02-03-05-07).

Eriedrone is voiced by Takaya Kuroda (黒田 崇矢, Kuroda Takaya).

===== Scorpio =====
Scorpio (スコルピオ, Sukorupio) is Stinger's older brother who betrayed him and his people to join Jark Matter, becoming Don Armage's top assassin. Because of his success, his position is only known to Don Armage and he is eventually promoted to Karo of the Scorpius System. He was sent to Earth after the Kyurangers became a threat to Jark Matter's campaign when they defeated Eriedrone and Ikargen. Upon reuniting with Stinger, Scorpio tricks him into believing he joined Jark Matter to kill Don Armage and save the universe. However, he later revealed his true goal was to usurp the tyrant and assume control of Jark Matter for himself. After being defeated by Stinger, Scorpio chooses to save his brother from their people's Antares technique and sacrifice himself to protect the Kyurangers from Don Armage's attack.

In battle, Scorpio's primary ability is to transform the victims of his tail stinger's venom into his zombie-like slaves. While he was originally humanoid like Stinger and their people, Don Armage mutated him into a sea scorpion/crop circle-themed monstrous being with the ability to wrap his tail around his leg and perform a powerful kick attack. In addition to his tail, he wields the Jark Javelin (ジャークジャベリン, Jāku Jaberin).

Scorpio is portrayed by Yuki Kubota (久保田 悠来, Kubota Yūki).

===== Minor Karos =====
- Magera (マゲラー, Magerā): The Karo of the Aries System (オヒツジ座系, Ohitsuji-za-kei) who hails from Planet Supun (惑星スプン, Wakusei Supun) and wields the Magelauncher (マゲランチャー, Mageranchā) machine gun. After being defeated by Shishi Red, Tenbin Gold, Hebitsukai Silver, Chameleon Green, Kajiki Yellow, and Houou Soldier, Magera is enlarged before he is killed by Orion Battler. Magera is voiced by Sho Koneri (こねり 翔, Koneri Shō).
- Unjet (ウンジェット, Unjetto): The Karo of the Leo Minor System who hails from Planet Ogo (惑星オーゴ, Wakusei Ōgo) in the Leo Minor System and pilots the Flying Purekonji Machine (空陸両用プレコンジ機, Kū Riku Ryōyō Purekonji-ki) exosuit. After being defeated by Shishi Red Orion, Sasori Orange, Ookami Blue, Oushi Black, Chameleon Green, and Kajiki Yellow, Unjet is enlarged before he is killed by Super KyurenOh (03-05-07-09-77). Unjet is voiced by Motoki Takagi (高城 元気, Takagi Genki).
- Jumottsu (ジューモッツ, Jūmottsu): The Karo of the Leo System who hails from Planet Toula (惑星トウラ, Wakusei Tōra) in the Leo System and wields the Sunadetsukulauncher (スナデツクランチャー, Sunadetsukuranchā) launchers and the Suna Sniper (スナスナイパー, Suna Sunaipā) handguns. He used his sand doll creation ability to assume the identity of King Aslan and rule Planet Kaien with an iron fist until the Kyurangers discover his ruse. He is later killed in his Big Morimers after it is destroyed by Gigant Houoh. Jumottsu is voiced by Shinpachi Tsuji (辻 親八, Tsuji Shinpachi).
- Desugon (デスゴン): The Karo of the Cepheus System who hails from Planet Nebyura (惑星ネビュラ, Wakusei Nebyura) in the Cepheus System and dual wields the twin Kenpoken (ケンポーケン, Kenpōken) chakram. After being defeated by Ookami Blue, Hebitsukai Silver, Chameleon Green, Washi Pink, Ryu Commander, and Houou Soldier, Desugon is enlarged before he is killed by RyuteiOh (03-06-07-08-10). Desugon is voiced by Matsuo Matsuo (松尾 まつお, Matsuo Matsuo).
- Gloven (グローブン, Gurōbun): The baseball player-themed Karo of the Cassiopeia System who hails from Planet Small Tokuta (惑星小トクタ, Wakusei Shō Tokuta) in the Cassiopeia System. After being defeated by Shishi Red Orion, Gloven is enlarged before he is killed by Kyutamajin and Orion Battler. Gloven is voiced by Fukushi Ochiai (落合 福嗣, Ochiai Fukushi).
- Southern King (サザンキング, Sazan Kingu): The Karo of the Crux System who hails from Planet Minami (惑星ミナーミ, Wakusei Mināmi) in the Crux System, has the Maborojuji (マボロジュウジ, Maborojūji) head, and is equipped with the twin forearm-mounted Southern Crusher (サザンクラッシャー, Sazan Kurasshā) blades. He had previously ruled his home world before willingly swearing allegiance to Don Armage to obtain more power, at the cost of his people. He serves as the first of Armage's defenders after the Kyurangers bypass the barrier protecting the Crux System and attack Planet Southern Cross, though he is killed by Shishi Red Orion. The Southern King is voiced by Kenji Hamada (浜田 賢二, Hamada Kenji).

====== Other Karos ======
- Zandabarudo (ザンダバルド): The thunderbird-themed Karo of the Norma System (ジョウギ座系, Jōgi-za-kei) who hails from Planet Totem (惑星トーテム, Wakusei Tōtemu) in the Aquila System, wields the Zandabatou (ザンダーバー刀, Zandābātō) sword, and appears exclusively in the V-Cinema Uchu Sentai Kyuranger: Episode of Stinger. He was previously a Daikaan on Earth before he manipulated an Earth town he terrorized into ostracizing the human-alien hybrid Mika Retsu and exploiting her revenge for Don Armage's enjoyment. In the present, he makes himself known to the Kyurangers while they were liberating Planet 3B before he is killed by Sasori Orange Ikkakuju Arm. Zandabarudo is voiced by Tsutomu Isobe (磯部 勉, Isobe Tsutomu).

==== Assassins ====
The assassins are members of Jark Matter responsible for eliminating rebels and rank between Karo and Daikaan.

===== Ikargen =====
Ikargen (イカーゲン, Ikāgen) is a kraken-themed assassin with hundreds of eyes surrounding his body from Planet Crystalikall (惑星クリスタルイカル, Wakusei Kurisutaruikaru) in the Crux System who wields the Gesword Rifle (ゲソードライフル, Gesōdo Raifuru), which can double as a sword. Throughout his career as a Jark Matter assassin, he has destroyed over one thousand planets alongside Mardakko and brought the Rebellion to the brink of destruction after killing their leader, Big Bear. Following Eriedrone's death, he and Mardakko are sent to eliminate the Kyurangers. Ikargen was able to dodge all of their attacks until Lucky used the Futago Kyutama's power to counteract the assassin's biology before he was defeated by the Kyurangers. Ikargen enlarged himself and attempted to produce torrential acid rain, but was destroyed by Ryutei KyurenOh (01-02-03-05-07-09-10-11).

Ikargen is voiced by Yoku Shioya (塩屋 翼, Shioya Yoku).

===== Mardakko =====
Mardakko (マーダッコ, Mādakko) is a gigantic octopus-themed assassin with regenerative capabilities from Planet Crystakoskull (惑星クリスタコスカル, Wakusei Kurisutakosukaru) in the Octans System (ハチブンギ座系, Hachibungi-za-kei) who can regenerate lost limbs and resurrect herself from any trace of her physical remains, though she develops a new personality as a result. Initially a rude and hot-blooded individual, Mardakko is deployed to Earth with her partner Ikargen to eliminate the Kyurangers following Eriedrone's demise, but are killed themselves. Developing secretary mannerisms, then a sensual and flirty persona after a second encounter with the Kyurangers, Don Armage orders her to spy on Scorpio under the guise of becoming his second-in-command. Though Mardakko is killed while in the Space Squad's universe while attempting to steal the Rashinban Kyutama, Scorpio uses a fragment he kept on his person to revive her as an over-dramatic individual. She activates all of the Morimers on Earth to siphon its Planedium before they and Scorpio's Big Morimers are destroyed by Houou Soldier, who kills her in the subsequent duel. Tetchu revives her once more on Planet Toki, though she develops a groupie-like personality and spends more time idolizing the Kyurangers instead of fighting them before they kill her once again.

Following her sixth revival, Mardakko returns to her original personality, became the Karo of the Perseus System, and allows herself to be converted into the cyborg Mecha Mardakko (メカマーダッコ, Meka Mādakko) to become more powerful, while sacrificing her regenerative abilities. While she is defeated by 10 of the Kyurangers during the battle on Planet Southern Cross, Mecha Mardakko is enlarged and summons a Death Worm to aid her before she is destroyed along with the creature by Kyutamajin and the Battle Orion Ship.

In both her original form and as Mecha Mardakko, she wields the Octopus-Wiring Electromagnetic Scattering Whip (タコ足配線電磁バラバラムチ, Takoashi Haisen Denji Barabara Muchi), the Tacommand Vulcan (タコマンドバルカン, Takomando Barukan) Gatling gun, the Tachometer Tentaclaymore (タコメーター付テンタクレイモア, Takomētā-tsuki Tentakureimoa) sword, the Takoyakiller (タコヤキラー, Takoyakirā) morning star, and the Shock Shooter (ショックシューター, Shokku Shūtā) handgun.

Mardakko is voiced by Eri Kitamura (喜多村 英梨, Kitamura Eri).

==== Foot soldiers ====
- Indavers (インダベー, Indabē): Masked grey alien-themed Inda (インダ) battle pseudo-lifeform combatants who wield the Gyoisaber (ギョイサーベル, Gyoisāberu) sabers and pilot fighter crafts called Moaider (モアイダー, Moaidā).
- Tsuyoindavers (ツヨインダベー, Tsuyoindabē): Flatwoods monster-themed enhanced battle pseudo-lifeform combatants who lead the Indavers, wield the Bazookons (バズーコン, Bazūkon) clubs that double as a gun, and have the ability to enlarge themselves. The high-ranking members have a Kyodainro (キョダインロウ, Kyodainrō) inro as proof of authority, which can also be used to enlarge themselves.

==== Daikaans ====
The Daikaans (ダイカーン, Daikān) are commanders who are sent to conquer and control planets. Each of them have a space battleship called Morimers (モライマーズ, Moraimāzu) capable of draining planets' Planedium and changing into a Morimers Robo (モライマーズロボ, Moraimāzu Robo) that wields a spear. While most planets are occupied by one Daikaan, Earth is controlled by multiple Daikaans since it is rich in Planedium. Most Daikaans are aliens that hailed from various points of origin in the universe, though some are Tsuyoindavers who were promoted and received modifications in the Jark Matter Laboratory.

- Gamettsui (ガメッツイ): The Egyptian death mask/slug-themed Daikaan of Planet Jigama (惑星ジガマ, Wakusei Jigama) in the Sagittarius System who hails from Planet Tutan (ツタン星, Tsutan-sei) in the Lacerta System (トカゲ座系, Tokage-za-kei), possesses the Gappo Tail (ガッポ尻尾, Gappo Shippo), and wields the Tutan Gun (ツタンガン, Tsutan Gan). Though he is defeated by Shishi Red, Tenbin Gold, and Hebitsukai Silver, Gamettsui is enlarged before being destroyed by KyurenOh (01-03-04-05-06). Gamettsui is voiced by Hideo Ishikawa (石川 英郎, Ishikawa Hideo).
- Moretsuyoindaver (モーレツヨインダベー, Mōretsuyoindabē): The Daikaan of Planet Needle in the Scorpius System and a promoted Tsuyoindaver who wears the Moretsu Mask (モーレツマスク, Mōretsu Masuku) and wields a Bazookon. He is destroyed by Sasori Orange for intervening in his battle with Shishi Red. Moretsuyoindaver is voiced by Yukinori Okuhata (奥畑 幸典, Okuhata Yukinori).
- Yumepakkun (ユメパックン): One of Earth's Daikaans and a crocodile-themed alien who hails from Planet Newne (惑星ニューネ, Wakusei Nyūne) in the Cetus System (クジラ座系, Kujira-za-kei), has the Jaws Nose (ジョーズノーズ, Jōzu Nōzu) and wields the Dreuma Catcher (ドリウマキャッチャー, Doriuma Kyatchā) spear. Though he is defeated by Shishi Red, Yumepakkun is enlarged before being destroyed by KyurenOh (01-04-06-08-09). Yumepakkun is voiced by Hironori Kondō (近藤 浩徳, Kondō Hironori).
- Denvil (デンビル, Denbiru): One of Earth's Daikaans who hails from Planet Jaji (惑星ジャジー, Wakusei Jajī) in the Monoceros System (イッカクジュウ座系, Ikkakujū-za-kei), has the Longrokubi (ロングロ首, Rongurokubi) neck, and wields the Birivil Whip (ビリビルウィップ, Biribiru Wippu). He is killed when his Morimers Robo is destroyed by KyurenOh (01-03-04-07-09). Denvil is voiced by Takatsugu Awazu (粟津 貴嗣, Awazu Takatsugu).
- Tome (トゥーミー, Tūmī): One of Earth's Daikaans who hails from Planet Stonehen (惑星ストーンヘン, Wakusei Sutōnhen) in the Ara System (サイダン座系, Saidan-za-kei), has the Stealberry Lights (スティールベリーライト, Sutīruberī Raito) breast, and is equipped with the twin forearm-mounted Birslicer (バースライサー, Bāsuraisā) blades. Though he is defeated by Shishi Red, Sasori Orange, Tenbin Gold, Hebitsukai Silver, and Chameleon Green, Tome is enlarged before being destroyed along with his Morimers by the Tenbin and Hebitsukai Voyagers. Tome is voiced by Kentarō Itō (伊藤 健太郎, Itō Kentarō).
- Mamoritsuyoindaver (マモリツヨインダベー, Mamoritsuyoindabē): One of Earth's Daikaans and a promoted Tsuyoindaver who wears the Mamori Mask (マモリマスク, Mamori Masuku) and wields a Bazookon. He enlarges himself, but is destroyed by the Shishi and Kajiki Voyagers alongside his Morimers. Mamoritsuyoindaver is voiced by Yasunao Sakai (坂井 易直, Sakai Yasunao).
- Megatsuyoindaver (メガツヨインダベー, Megatsuyoindabē): One of Earth's Daikaans and a promoted Tsuyoindaver who wears the Mega Crest (メガクレスト, Mega Kuresuto) and wields a Bazookon. He is killed in his Morimers Robo when it is destroyed by KyurenOh (01-02-03-07-08). Megatsuyoindaver is voiced by Yasunao Sakai.
- Meshiubaindaver (メシウバインダベー, Meshiubaindabē): One of Earth's Daikaans and a promoted Tsuyoindaver who wears the Harahelmet (ハラヘルメット, Haraherumetto) and wields a Bazookon. He is destroyed by Shishi Red, Chameleon Green, and Kajiki Yellow. Meshiubaindaver is voiced by Hiroyuki Muraoka (村岡 弘之, Muraoka Hiroyuki).
- Metchatsuyoindaver (メッチャツヨインダベー, Metchatsuyoindabē): One of Earth's Daikaans and a promoted Tsuyoindaver who wears the Metcha Mask (メッチャマスク, Metcha Masuku) and wields a Bazookon. Though he is defeated by Shishi Red, Ookami Blue, and Washi Pink, Metchatsuyoindaver is enlarged before being destroyed by the Ryu Voyager.
- Mutchatsuyoindaver (ムッチャツヨインダベー, Mutchatsuyoindabē): One of Earth's Daikaans and a promoted Tsuyoindaver who wears the Mutchamet (ムッチャメット, Mutchametto) helmet and wields a Bazookon. Though he is defeated by Sasori Orange, Chameleon Green, and Kajiki Yellow, Mutchatsuyoindaver is enlarged before being destroyed by the Ryu Voyager.
- Mozuma (モズマ): One of Earth's Daikaans who hails from Planet Ga (惑星ガ, Wakusei Ga) in the Aquila System and has Ayatsurinpun (アヤツリンプン) scales on his wings. He is destroyed by Shishi Red and Koguma Skyblue. Mozuma is voiced by Nobuo Tobita (飛田 展男, Tobita Nobuo).
- Mondomuyoindaver (モンドムヨインダベー, Mondomuyoindabē): One of Earth's Daikaans and a promoted Tsuyoindaver who wears the Bajitouhood (バジトウフード, Bajitōfūdo). Though he is defeated by Shishi Red, Sasori Orange, Oushi Black, Ryu Commander, and Koguma Skyblue, Mondomuyoindaver is destroyed along with his Morimers Robo by Ryutei KyurenOh (01-02-03-05-07-09-10-11). Mondomuyoindaver is voiced by Takaki Ōtomari (大泊 貴揮, Ōtomari Takaki).
- Yuterujan (ユーテルジャン, Yūterujan): One of Earth's Daikaans and a UFO-themed alien who hails from Planet Cattlemi (惑星キャトルミ, Wakusei Kyatorumi) in the Taurus System and wields the Yutail (ユーテイル, Yūteiru) whip. He is destroyed by Shishi Red, Ookami Blue, and Kajiki Yellow. Yuterujan is voiced by Hisao Egawa (江川 央生, Egawa Hisao).
- Goneshi (ゴネーシ, Gonēshi): The Daikaan of Planet Vela (惑星ベラ, Wakusei Bera) in the Vela System (ホ座系, Ho-za-kei) who hails from Planet Ness (惑星ネス, Wakusei Nesu) in the Piscis Austrinus System (ミナミノウオ座系, Minaminouo-za-kei), has the Nanikashira (ナニカシラ) head, and wields the Ooborident (オオボライデント, Ōboraidento) trident. Though he is defeated by Shishi Red, Hebitsukai Silver, Chameleon Green, Washi Pink, and Kajiki Yellow, Goneshi is enlarged before being destroyed along with his Morimers by KyurenOh (01-06-07-08-09). Goneshi is voiced by Kyousei Tsukui (津久井 教生, Tsukui Kyōsei).
- Shaidos (シャイドス, Shaidosu): One of Earth's Daikaans who hails from Planet People (惑星ピーポー, Wakusei Pīpō) in the Lynx System (ヤマネコ座系, Yamaneko-za-kei) and has the Seek Head (シークヘッド, Shīku Heddo) and the Osakimacclaw (オサキマックロー, Osakimakkurō). Though he is defeated by Shishi Red Moon, Shaidos is enlarged before being destroyed by RyuteiOh (03–04–10). Shaidos is voiced by Yōji Ueda (上田 燿司, Ueda Yōji).
- Omega (オメーガ, Omēga): The Daikaan of Planet Keel (惑星キール, Wakusei Kīru) in the Carina System (リュウコツ座系, Ryūkotsu-za-kei) who hails from Planet Jintozo (惑星ジントゾー, Wakusei Jintozō) in the Caelum System (チョウコクグ座系, Chōkokugu-za-kei) and has the Megaton Punch (メーガトンパンチ, Mēgaton Panchi) fists. Though he is defeated by Tenbin Gold, Hebitsukai Silver, Chameleon Green, and Kajiki Yellow, Omega is enlarged before being destroyed along with his Morimers by KyurenOh (01-04-06-07-09). Omega is voiced by Hajime Iijima (飯島 肇, Iijima Hajime).
- Manavil (マナビル, Manabiru): One of Earth's Daikaans and the president of Jark Matter University's Earth branch. Like Denvil, he also hails from Planet Jaji in the Monoceros System, but Manavil has the Manavil History Book (マナビル歴史書, Manabiru Rekishisho) and wields the Yubisastick (ユビサステック, Yubisasutikku) pointer. Though he is defeated by Washi Pink, Kajiki Yellow, and Houou Soldier, Manavil is enlarged before being destroyed by Gigant Houoh. Manavil is voiced by Yūsuke Numata (沼田 祐介, Numata Yūsuke).
- Media Tsuyoindaver (メディアツヨインダベー, Media Tsuyoindabē): One of Earth's Daikaans and a promoted Tsuyoindaver who wears the Cardiguard (カーディガード, Kādigādo) protector, wields a Bazookon, and is accompanied by an Indaver operating the Toranacamera (トラナキャメラ, Toranakyamera) television camera. Though he is defeated by Shishi Red, Ookami Blue, Chameleon Green, Washi Pink, and Kajiki Yellow, Media Tsuyoindaver is enlarged before being destroyed by KyurenOh (01-03-07-08-09) and RyuteiOh (06–10–11). Media Tsuyoindaver is voiced by Takanori Ōyama (大山 鎬則, Ōyama Takanori).
- Micro Tsuyoindaver (ミクロツヨインダベー, Mikuro Tsuyoindabē): The Daikaan of Naga Ray and a promoted Tsuyoindaver who has the Chiisa Gene (チーサ遺伝子, Chīsa Idenshi). Though he is defeated by Shishi Red, Micro Tsuyoindaver is enlarged to human size before being destroyed by Tenbin Gold and Hebitsukai Silver. Before he died, he created a giant replica of Hebitsukai Metal, but it is destroyed by Kyutamajin. Micro Tsuyoindaver is voiced by Tetsuharu Ōta (太田 哲治, Ōta Tetsuharu).

===== Other Daikaans =====
- Clocku (クロックー, Kurokkū): The Daikaan of Planet Bonobono (惑星ボノボノ, Wakusei Bonobono) in the Aries System. Though he is defeated by Shishi Red, Ookami Blue, Hebitsukai Silver, Chameleon Green, and Kajiki Yellow, Clocku is enlarged before being destroyed by KyurenOh (01-03-06-07-09). Clocku appears exclusively in the special drama sessions of the series' first original soundtrack and is voiced by Yasuhiro Takato (高戸 靖広, Takato Yasuhiro).
- Kouchou Indaver (コウチョウインダベー, Kōchō Indabē): The Daikaan of Planet 3B (惑星スリービー, Wakusei Surībī) in the Norma System and the head of the School Indaver Family (スクールインダベー一家, Sukūru Indabē-ikka) who serves as the principal of a Jark Matter school that brainwashes the galaxy's prodigies into becoming Jark Matter members. He hails from Planet Eight Gold (惑星エイトゴールド, Wakusei Eito Gōrudo) in the Circinus System (コンパス座系, Konpasu-za-kei) and wields the Yurushiwa Shinai (ユルシワ竹刀). Kouchou Indaver is killed when his Morimers Robo is destroyed by KyurenOh (01-06-07-09-11). This Daikaan appears exclusively in the web-exclusive series From Episode of Stinger: Uchu Sentai Kyuranger: High School Wars and the film Uchu Sentai Kyuranger: Episode of Stinger. Kouchou Indaver is voiced by Yousuke Itou (伊藤 陽佑, Itō Yōsuke)
  - Kyoutou Indaver (キョウトウインダベー, Kyōtō Indabē): Kouchou Indaver's wife who serves as the school's vice-principal. She is defeated by the Kyurangers. Kyoutou Indaver appears exclusively in High School Wars. Kyoutou Indaver is voiced by Sakura Miyajima (宮島 咲良, Miyajima Sakura).
  - Seitokaichou Indaver (セイトカイチョウインダベー, Seitokaichō Indabē): Kouchou Indaver's son who serves as the school's student council president. He is defeated by the Kyurangers. Seitokaichou Indaver appears exclusively in High School Wars. Seitokaichou Indaver is voiced by Yousuke Itou.
- Rijichou Indaver (リジチョウインダベー, Rijichō Indabē): The ruler of the Jark Matter school, ranking above Kouchou Indaver, and head of the Chou Clan (チョウ一族, Chō-ichizoku). He is destroyed by Kotaro. This Daikaan appears exclusively in the web-exclusive series From Episode of Stinger: Uchu Sentai Kyuranger: High School Wars. Rijichou Indaver is voiced by Kōhei Yamamoto (山本 康平, Yamamoto Kōhei), who also portrays his humanoid form.
- Mika Retsu (ミカ・レーツ, Mika Rētsu): One of Earth's Daikaans and a human-alien hybrid with the genetic code of a Monoceros System alien who wields the Mika Claw (ミカクロー, Mika Kurō) alicorn. She was initially a Jark Matter recruit from Earth under the Karo Zandabarudo who wanted the power to exact revenge on her fellow townsfolk for ostracizing her due to her heritage. After Don Armage promoted her to Daikaan, he infused her with his essence, granting her the ability to transform into a human combustion-themed partial monster. Stinger and Champ attempt to save her, but she is murdered by Zandabarudo, who reveals he manipulated her life for his own ambitions. Using the last of her life, she gave Stinger the Ikkakuju Kyutama so he could defeat Zandabarudo. Mika Retsu appears exclusively in the film Uchu Sentai Kyuranger: Episode of Stinger and is portrayed by Yuki Mamiya (間宮 夕貴, Mamiya Yuki).
- Chunenshachu (チュウネンシャチュー, Chūnenshachū): The Daikaan of Planet Weeg (惑星ウィーグ, Wakusei Wīgu) in the Coma Berenices System (カミノケ座系, Kaminoke-za-kei). He is destroyed by Shishi Red, Hebitsukai Silver, Washi Pink, Kajiki Yellow, and Ryu Commander. This Daikaan appears exclusively in the CD audio drama Uchu Sentai Kyuranger: Make Him Cry! The Tamakyu Troupe Hot Match!. Chunenshachu is voiced by Tatsuhisa Suzuki (鈴木 達央, Suzuki Tatsuhisa).

=== Hoshi Minato ===
Hoshi Minato (ホシ★ミナト) is an alien pop star known as the No.1 artist in the universe. In the past, he was originally a lonely low-level street performer, until an encounter with his friend Hammie set them both on the path to finding their dreams to live on. After the Kyurangers discover and free Minato from one of Don Armage's copies, he rallies his fans into rebelling against Jark Matter.

Hoshi Minato is portrayed by Hiroya Matsumoto (松本 寛也, Matsumoto Hiroya).

=== Orion ===
Orion (オライオン, Oraion): A warrior from Orion System (オリオン座系, Orion-za-kei) who wields a club in combat, one of the legendary 88 saviors who fought alongside Tsurugi in the past against Jark Matter, and the namesake of the Kyurangers' ship. After Don Armage's apparent defeat, he placed Tsurugi into a cryogenic slumber within the Argo and entrusted Eris with the Ryukotsu Kyutama. He would later meet and join forces with the Kyurangers after half of them traveled back in time to learn more about Don Armage and help his distant descendant Lucky unlock the Saiko Kyutama. After Orion died in battle against Don Armage, Shou Ronpo and Champ chose to stay behind in the past to take his place in ensuring the Kyurangers assemble in the present.

Orion is portrayed by Kai Shishido (宍戸 開, Shishido Kai).

=== Aslan ===
Lucky's father, Aslan (アスラン, Asuran), was originally the king of Planet Kaien in the Leo System prior to Jark Matter's invasion. While the Kyurangers believed he was killed by Kukuruga and a facsimile ruled over Kaien in his place, Aslan was in reality possessed by Don Armage to become his thrall Don Aslan (ドン・アスラン, Don Asuran). He faced the Kyurangers Planet Southern Cross in the Crux System as one of Armage's last lines of defense, but after they freed him, Aslan helps the Kyurangers escape before sacrificing himself to use the Black Hole Kyutama to prevent Jark Matter's Planedium Bomb from destroying the universe.

Aslan is portrayed by Ginnojo Yamazaki (山崎 銀之丞, Yamazaki Gin'nojō).

== Guest characters ==
- Jiro Sakuma (佐久間 次郎, Sakuma Jirō): Kotaro's younger brother who is portrayed by Eishi Ofuji (大藤 瑛史, Ōfuji Eishi).
- Space Ikadevil (スペースイカデビル, Supēsu Ikadebiru): A revived squid monster from the Shocker terrorist organization who attracts the attention of Shishi Red and Sasori Orange after they mistake him for Ikargen. After Shishi Red summons Kamen Rider Ex-Aid, they join forces to destroy Space Ikadevil. Space Ikadevil is voiced by Tomokazu Seki (関 智一, Seki Tomokazu), who reprises his role from the crossover film Kamen Rider × Super Sentai × Space Sheriff: Super Hero Taisen Z.
- Emu Hojo (宝生 永夢, Hōjō Emu): A master gamer and surgical intern who can transform into Kamen Rider Ex-Aid (仮面ライダーエグゼイド, Kamen Raidā Eguzeido). Using the Ex-Aid Kyutama, Lucky summons Kamen Rider Ex-Aid to help him defeat Space Ikadevil. Emu and his fellow Gamer Riders would later join forces with the Kyurangers again to defeat Shocker during the events of the crossover film Kamen Rider × Super Sentai: Ultra Super Hero Taisen. Emu Hojo is portrayed by Hiroki Iijima (飯島 寛騎, Iijima Hiroki), who reprises his role from his self-titled TV series.
- Big Bear (ビッグベア, Biggu Bea): An ursine alien and the Rebellion's original supreme commander and Shou's superior. Big Bear sacrificed himself to save Shou from Jark Matter assassins Ikargen and Mardakko, but was unable to ascend to the afterlife after seeing Shou's foolishness in commanding the Rebellion and worrying for his comrade. After seeing Shou's effectiveness as a leader and Kotaro's bravery in battle, Big Bear entrusts the latter with the Koguma Kyutama and returns to inhabit it so he can fight alongside him. Big Bear is voiced by Kiyoyuki Yanada (梁田 清之, Yanada Kiyoyuki).
- Death Worms (デスワーム, Desu Wāmu): Subterranean alien creatures that are widely distributed on desert planets, possess Hole Mouths (ホールマウス, Hōru Mausu), and the ability to change their size at will. The Kyurangers encounter several during their battles against Jark Matter, with the latter faction having used them on several occasions. Along the way, the Kyurangers encounter an individual of the Metal Death Worm (メタルデスワーム, Metaru Desu Wāmu) subspecies, which possesses Metal Silba (メタルシル歯, Metaru Shiruba) teeth and Tetchu kept as a pet before it is killed by Gigant Houou, and a Boss Worm (ボスワーム, Bosu Wāmu), which possesses Dokudoku C (ドクドクC, Dokudoku Shī) poison and Doctor Anton created from 999 Death Worms before it is destroyed by Super KyurenOh (02-07-09-11-77).
- Eris (エリス, Erisu): The forest spirit of Planet Keel in the Carina System who has the ability to manipulate plants and an ally of the original Kyurangers. Centuries prior, she was charged by Orion with protecting the Ryukotsu Kyutama and by the time traveling Shou with the Battle Orion Ship's location. Despite her role, she has a ditzy personality and a tendency to fall in love with whoever impresses her. Eris is portrayed by Hinano Ayakawa (彩川 ひなの, Ayakawa Hinano).
- Echidna (エキドナ, Ekidona): A woman from the Ophiuchus System who came to Earth following Naga Ray's brainwashing. While she initially intends to punish him for obtaining emotions, as it is considered a crime on their home world, she decides to have faith in Naga after his purification and departs peacefully. Echidna is portrayed by Taiki Yamazaki, who also portrays Naga, and voiced by Ayumi Tsunematsu (恒松 あゆみ, Tsunematsu Ayumi).

=== Returning characters ===
- Space Squad (スペース・スクワッド, Supēsu Sukuwaddo): A group of space-based heroes from another universe. In episode 18, Shishi Red and Hebitsukai Silver encounter them while pursuing Mardakko to reclaim the Rashinban Kyutama. The Kyurangers would encounter the Space Squad again amidst their battle with Demost during the events of the crossover film Uchu Sentai Kyuranger vs. Space Squad.
  - Geki Jumonji (十文字 撃, Jūmonji Geki): A member of the Space Squad and the Galactic Union Police (銀河連邦警察, Ginga Renpō Keisatsu) who serves as Gavan Type-G (ギャバンタイプG, Gyaban Taipu Jī). Geki Jumonji is portrayed by Yuma Ishigaki (石垣 佑磨, Ishigaki Yūma), who reprises his role from Space Sheriff Gavan: The Movie.
  - Banban Akaza (赤座 伴番, Akaza Banban): An elite officer in the Space Squad and the S.P.D. (Special Police Dekaranger)'s Fire Squad, also known as Ban (バン), who serves as Deka Red (デカレッド, Deka Reddo). Banban Akaza is portrayed by Ryuji Sainei (さいねい 龍二, Sainei Ryūji), who reprises his role from Tokusou Sentai Dekaranger.
  - Senichi Enari (江成 仙一, Enari Sen'ichi): A member of the Space Squad and an officer of the S.P.D.'s Earth unit, also known as Sen-chan (センちゃん), who serves as Deka Green (デカグリーン, Deka Gurīn). He is also Koume Kodou's husband. Senichi Enari is portrayed by Yousuke Itou (伊藤 陽佑, Itō Yōsuke), who reprises his role from Tokusou Sentai Dekaranger.
  - Koume Kodou (胡堂 小梅, Kodō Koume): A member of the Space Squad and an officer of the S.P.D.'s Earth unit, also known as Umeko (ウメコ), who serves as Deka Pink (デカピンク, Deka Pinku). She is also Senichi Enari's wife. Koume Kodou is portrayed by Mika Kikuchi (菊地 美香, Kikuchi Mika), who reprises her role from Tokusou Sentai Dekaranger.
  - Doggie Kruger (ドギー・クルーガー, Dogī Kurūgā): A member of the Space Squad and commander of the S.P.D.'s Earth unit, also known as Boss (ボス, Bosu), who serves as Deka Master (デカマスター, Deka Masutā). Doggie Kruger is voiced by Tetsu Inada (稲田 徹, Inada Tetsu), who reprises his role from Tokusou Sentai Dekaranger.

== Spin-off characters ==
- Independent units: Jark Matter members who appear exclusively in the film Uchu Sentai Kyuranger the Movie: Geth Indaver Strikes Back.
  - Geth Indaver (ゲース・インダベー, Gēsu Indabē): The cyborg leader of the Independent Units who hails from Planet Nanzca (惑星ナンスカ, Wakusei Nansuka) in the Apus System (フウチョウ座系, Fūchō-za-kei) who wields the Gesniper (ゲースナイパー, Gēsunaipā) handgun and the Gethcalibur (ゲースカリバー, Gēsukaribā) sword. He was originally a Rebellion member named Hoi Kouro (ホイ・コウロー, Hoi Kōrō) and Shou Ronpo's colleague who researched the Cerberus' legend until Shou was forced to banish him from the Rebellion upon learning of Hoi's malicious intent. Following this, Hoi joined Jark Matter, had his body cybernetically modified, and gained command of the planet-sized superweapon Geth Star (ゲース・スター, Gēsu Sutā). Geth Indaver's desire for revenge and Cerberus' power fueled his intent to smash the Geth Star into Earth. Though he manages to revive Cerberus before it is turned into the Cerberus Voyager, Geth Indaver is killed by Ryu Commander while the Geth Star is destroyed by Cerberios. Geth Indaver is portrayed by Ryō Tamura (田村 亮, Tamura Ryō).
  - Omo Indaver (オーモ・インダベー, Ōmo Indabē): A yeti-themed member of the Independent Units who excels in wrestling and wields the Freezer Kusary (フリーザー・クサリィ, Furīzā Kusaryi) kusari-fundo. After being defeated by Tenbin Gold, Hebitsukai Silver, Washi Pink, and Koguma Skyblue, Omo Indaver is enlarged before he is killed by Gigant Houoh. Omo Indaver is voiced by Razor Ramon HG (レイザーラモンHG, Reizā Ramon Eichi Jī).
  - Kaal Indaver (カール・インダベー, Kāru Indabē): A skyfish-themed member of the Independent Units who wields the Flying Rod (フライングロッド, Furaingu Roddo) sword that doubles as a gun and possesses a motorcycle. He is killed by Oushi Black, Chameleon Green, and Kajiki Yellow. Kaal Indaver is voiced by Razor Ramon RG (レイザーラモンRG, Reizā Ramon Āru Jī).
- Space Ninja Demost (宇宙忍 デモスト, Uchuunin Demosuto): A space ninja who seeks to take over the universe using the Neo Kyutamas and appears exclusively in the crossover film Uchu Sentai Kyuranger vs. Space Squad. After kidnapping Hammie's mentor Tsurukiku to force her into helping him get the Kyutamas, Demost revives Mele, Juzo Fuwa, Basco Ta Jolokia, and Escape to assist him as well before he is defeated by the Kyurangers, Gavan Type-G, and Shaider. Demost is voiced by Satoshi Hino (日野 聡, Hino Satoshi).
- Don Arkage (ドン・アルカゲ, Don Arukage): A Jark Matter remnant and Don Armage's body double who seeks the power of Jark Matter's lost treasure, Hyper Planedium (ハイパープラネジューム, Haipā Puranejūmu), to surpass Armage as the greatest evil in the universe, dual wields the twin Kagemushadow (カゲムシャドー, Kagemushadō) swords in combat, and appears exclusively in the crossover special Lupinranger VS Patranger VS Kyuranger. In pursuit of his goal, he invades the Lupinrangers and Patrangers' universe and joins forces with Gangler member Rirus Lipig to find Hoshi Minato. After the Kyurangers pursue him and join forces with the Lupinrangers and Patrangers to stop him, Don Arkage enlarges, but is killed by Good Cool Kaiser VSX. Don Arkage is voiced by Atsuki Tani.
