= Uchu Sentai Kyuranger vs. Space Squad =

- Theatrical release poster
- Kanji: 宇宙戦隊キュウレンジャーVSスペース・スクワッド
- Revised Hepburn: Uchū Sentai Kyūrenjā Bāsasu Supēsu Sukuwaddo
- Directed by: Koichi Sakamoto
- Screenplay by: Nobuhiro Mouri
- Based on: Super Sentai and Space Sheriff Gavan by Saburo Yatsude
- Starring: Takumi Kizu; Yosuke Kishi; Taiki Yamazaki; Sakurako Okubo; Tetsuji Sakakibara; Shota Taguchi; Keisuke Minami; Hiroaki Iwanaga; Yuma Ishigaki
- Cinematography: Shūji Momose
- Edited by: Kazuko Yanagisawa
- Music by: Kousuke Yamashita
- Production companies: Toei Company; TV Asahi; Toei Video; Toei Agency; Bandai
- Distributed by: Toei Company, Ltd.
- Release date: June 30, 2018
- Running time: 65 minutes
- Country: Japan
- Language: Japanese

Uchu Sentai Kyuranger vs. Space Squad (宇宙戦隊キュウレンジャーVSスペース・スクワッド, Uchū Sentai Kyūrenjā Bāsasu Supēsu Sukuwaddo) is a V-Cinema release that features a crossover of the Super Sentai and Metal Hero Series. The V-Cinema was released in Japanese theaters on June 30, 2018, and on DVD and Blu-ray on August 8, 2018.

The protagonists of Uchu Sentai Kyuranger and Space Sheriff Gavan: The Movie are featured, but the casts of Tokumei Sentai Go-Busters, Kaizoku Sentai Gokaiger, Samurai Sentai Shinkenger and Juken Sentai Gekiranger also participate in the film as well as characters from Sekai Ninja Sen Jiraiya.

A prologue web-exclusive series titled Hero Mama League (ヒーローママ★リーグ, Hīrō Mama Rīgu), featuring the casts from Ninpuu Sentai Hurricaneger, Tokusou Sentai Dekaranger and Mahou Sentai Magiranger was released on Toei Tokusatsu Fan Club on May 13, 2018.

== Plot ==
Space Sheriff Shu Karasuma and Toma Amagi, the current Jiraya, members of Space Squad, locate and attempt to arrest Space Ninja Demost from the criminal organization Genmakuu, but he escapes through a portal to the Kyurangers' universe with Shaider chasing after him. There, the universe has been rebuilding since Don Armage's defeat four years ago under Tsurugi Ohtori's leadership while the Kyurangers have parted ways to live their lives, until Shou Ronpo discovers that Hammie stole four of the newly developed Neo Kyutamas. This causes a division within the Kyurangers, with those following Tsurugi seeking to arrest Hammie while Lucky and the rest want to find her and find out the reason behind her actions.

Hammie brings the Kyutamas to Demost, who uses them to revive past Sentai villains Mele, Juzo Fuwa, Basco Ta Jolokia, and Escape to serve under him. He then sends the five to attack the other Kyurangers in a hit-and-run, worsening Hammie's credibility as Shu and his fellow Space Sheriff Geki Jumonji offer their aid. It is revealed that Hammie is being extorted by Demost, who is holding her mentor hostage after she was assumed dead during Jark Matter's reign, the space ninja forcing Hammie to comply with his order to assassinate Tsurugi.

Hammie makes the attempt when Tsurugi makes a public announcement of stepping down in light of the recent events, only to hesitate as Geki and Shu reveal her forced compliance to Demost as he is exposed as one of Tsurugi's aides in disguise; Naga and Balance having rescued Hammie's master as added evidence. Demost attempts to kill Hammie when Mele, having feigned loyalty while becoming a friend to the fellow chameleon-themed warrior, sacrifices herself. The Kyurangers, Gavan, and Shaider defeat Demost with Juzo, Basco, and Escape returning to the afterlife after his spell is broken. Geki and Shu take Demost back to their universe and are informed by Jiraya about a massive terrorist attack led by Genmakuu. This makes Geki consider scouting some other new members for the Space Squad to deal with such incidents.

== Cast ==
Super Sentai Series cast

- Lucky (ラッキー, Rakkī): Takumi Kizu (岐洲 匠, Kizu Takumi)
- Stinger (スティンガー, Sutingā): Yosuke Kishi (岸 洋佑, Kishi Yōsuke)
- Naaga Ray (ナーガ・レイ, Nāga Rei): Taiki Yamazaki (山崎 大輝, Yamazaki Taiki)
- Hammie (ハミィ, Hamyi): Sakurako Okubo (大久保 桜子, Ōkubo Sakurako)
- Spada (スパーダ, Supāda): Tetsuji Sakakibara (榊原 徹士, Sakakibara Tetsuji)
- Kotaro Sakuma (佐久間 小太郎, Sakuma Kotarō): Shota Taguchi (田口 翔大, Taguchi Shōta)
- Tsurugi Ohtori (鳳 ツルギ, Ōtori Tsurugi): Keisuke Minami (南 圭介, Minami Keisuke)
- Luka Millfy (ルカ・ミルフィ, Ruka Mirufi): Mao Ichimichi (市道 真央, Ichimichi Mao)
- Mele (メレ, Mere): Yuka Hirata (平田 裕香, Hirata Yuka)
- Juzo Fuwa (腑破 十臓, Fuwa Jūzō): Mitsuru Karahashi (唐橋 充, Karahashi Mitsuru)
- Basco Ta Jolokia (バスコ・タ・ジョロキア, Basuko Ta Jorokia): Kei Hosogai (細貝 圭, Hosogai Kei)
- Escape (エスケイプ, Esukeipu): Ayame Misaki (水崎 綾女, Misaki Ayame)

Metal Hero Series cast

- Geki Jumonji (十文字 撃, Jūmonji Geki): Yuma Ishigaki (石垣 佑磨, Ishigaki Yūma)
- Shu Karasuma (烏丸 舟, Karasuma Shū): Hiroaki Iwanaga (岩永 洋昭, Iwanaga Hiroaki)

Movie-exclusive cast

- Roy (ロイ, Roi): Masayuki Deai (出合 正幸, Deai Masayuki)
- Kimiko Naruse (鳴瀬 キミコ, Naruse Kimiko): Yuko Takayama (高山 侑子, Takayama Yūko)
- Tsurugiku (鶴菊): Satomi Hirose (広瀬 仁美, Hirose Satomi)
- Announcer: Sakura Miyajima (宮島 咲良, Miyajima Sakura)
- Pon Emi (ポン・エミ): Miyuki (幸)

Voice cast

- Garu (ガル): Kazuya Nakai (中井 和哉, Nakai Kazuya)
- Balance (バランス, Baransu): Yūki Ono (小野 友樹, Ono Yūki)
- Champ (チャンプ, Chanpu): Akio Ōtsuka (大塚 明夫, Ōtsuka Akio)
- Raptor 283 (ラプター283, Raputā Ni Hachi San; voice): M・A・O
- Shou Ronpo (ショウ・ロンポー, Shō Ronpō), Narrator: Hiroshi Kamiya (神谷 浩史, Kamiya Hiroshi)
- Space Ninja Demost (宇宙忍デモスト, Uchūnin Demosuto): Satoshi Hino (日野 聡, Hino Satoshi)
- Jiraiya (Touma Amagi) (ジライヤ (天城 闘真), Jiraiya (Amagi Tōma)): Kenji Akabane (赤羽根 健治, Akabane Kenji)

== Theme song ==
- "Mata Kimi ni Aitai" (また君に会いたい; "I Want to See You Again")
  - Lyrics: Shoko Fujibayashi (藤林 聖子, Fujibayashi Shōko)
  - Composition: Akira Yokota (横田 昭, Yokota Akira)
  - Arrangement: Daiju Takato (高藤 大樹, Takatō Daiju) (Project.R)
  - Artist: Kyuranger with Project.R (Takumi Kizu, Yosuke Kishi, Taiki Yamazaki, Sakurako Okubo, Tetsuji Sakakibara, Shota Taguchi, Keisuke Minami, Tomohiro Hatano, Tsuyoshi Matsubara)
