= Yosuke Kishi =

Japanese singer & actor (born 1993)

Yosuke Kishi 岸 洋佑
- Born: 2 July 1993 (age 33); Yokohama, Kanagawa, Japan
- Genres: J-pop
- Occupations: Singer; songwriter
- Instruments: Vocals; guitar
- Label: Nippon Columbia
- Website: Official website

Yosuke Kishi (岸 洋佑, Kishi Yōsuke; born 2 July 1993) is a Japanese singer and actor.

== Biography ==
Kishi was born in Yokohama, Kanagawa Prefecture. In 2010, he participated in the LDH sponsored Vocal Battle Audition 2 and became a finalist but lost.

In 2011, he started his music career under the producer Tatsuro Mashiko, who is a composer.

In 2014, Kishi left LDH.

On 1 December 2016, he announced that he is represented with Yōdō from K-Dash.

In 2017, Kishi joined the cast of Uchu Sentai Kyuranger, playing Stinger / Sasori Orange. He also starred in the first personal spin-off in Super Sentai history. Besides being in the lead role, he also provided the theme, insert and ending song of the movie. He also graduated from Waseda University in March.

In February 2018, Kishi embarked on a live house tour across Japan and released a self-produced album, for you. He traveled between 15 cities, while appearing in stage shows for Kyuranger on weekends. In April, a mobile fan club site is launched. After officially graduating from Kyuranger in the summer movie Uchu Sentai Kyuranger vs Space Squad, he held a birthday live in Shibuya and announced his major debut in December. Kishi's first mini-album, titled Hashitai wake janai (走りたいわけじゃない)is released by Nippon Columbia on 5 December. An anniversary one-man live was held on 21 December and was live broadcast on niconico.

In 2019, Kishi kicked off the year with an event tour performing free live shows in malls to promote his debut album. Door, a digital single is released on 1 April. He also started hosting a weekly YouTube show Elementary Channel, interviewing fellow artists. Kishi again announced his second album THE ONEMEN'S on this year's birthday live. The lead single from the album, Gomen ne(ごめんね), is released digitally on 31 July and its MV on 29 August. Prior to the album release on 25 September, Kishi ran another event tour. THE ONEMEN'S as a concept spawned a fictional six-men idol group of the same name, all personified by Kishi alone. In October, Kishi hosts for Nippon Cultural Broadcasting a live radio show, Kishi Yosuke's Start-Up where he interviews up-comers from all sectors. Kishi is to star in the musical A Christmas Carol as young Scrooge at the end of the year.

A live house tour titled 改めまして、岸洋佑と申します is scheduled for February and March 2020.

In 2021, Kishi formed a YouTube group towards Indonesian audience named SUKIYAKI LAKI-LAKI with Tetsuji Sakakibara, Keisuke Minami, Tsubasa Takayama and Ibul.

In 2024, Kishi returned to the world of tokusatsu, specifically Kamen Rider, where he played Granute Rojoe in an episode of Kamen Rider Gavv.

== Discography ==
=== Mini albums ===
Year	Title	Songs
2015	You	"Boku no Taisetsuna Kimi e"; "Crescia"; "Toki Aya"; "Friends!!!"; "Hanasaku Namida"; "Ashita"; "A Time For Christmas -Demo ver-" (bonus track)
2017	Episode of Stinger	"Sasoriza no Uta (acoustic ver.)" "Ichirin no Kage" "Mienai Kizuna"
2018	Hashiritai Wake Janai (走りたいわけじゃない)	"Mekkino Medal" "Bokuheno Chousenjou" "Umibeno Compass" "Itsukano Kimihe" "Chisai Tsukino Shitade"
2019	The Onemen's	"Gomen ne" "Door" "Natsuno Sympathy" "Itsu Itsu Mademo" "Gyudon no Uta" "Singin' Step"

=== Singles ===
Year	Title
2016	"Natsu, Kimi. / Emi tte"

=== Participation works ===
Year	Title
2016	Mistman "Story / Megami Summer"

== Filmography ==
=== Stage ===
Year	Title
2013	Atakku No. 1

=== Television ===
Year	Title	Role	Notes	Network	Ref.
2016	Tsūkai: TV Sukatto Japan	Sota Takashiro	"Gakusei Jidai no Omoide Sukatto: Anokoha Ace"	Fuji TV	
2017	Uchu Sentai Kyuranger	Stinger / Sasori Orange		TV Asahi	
2021	Mashin Sentai Kiramager Spin-Off: Yodonna	Shosuke Kakihara	Web-Exclusive		
2024	Kamen Rider Gavv	Kani / Granute Rojoe	Episodes 13-16	TV Asahi	

=== Movies ===
Year	Title	Role	Network	Notes	Ref.
2017	Kamen Rider × Super Sentai: Ultra Super Hero Taisen	Stinger / Sasori Orange	Movie		
2017	Uchu Sentai Kyuranger the Movie: Geth Indaver Strikes Back	Stinger / Sasori Orange	Movie		
2018	Uchu Sentai Kyuranger vs. Space Squad	Stinger / Sasori Orange	V-Cinema		
2019	Lupinranger VS Patranger VS Kyuranger	Stinger / Sasori Orange	V-Cinema		
