= Brizo =

Ancient Greek goddess

Brizo /ˈbraɪzoʊ/ (Greek: Βριζώ) is a minor Greek goddess, venerated on the island of Delos as the protector of mariners, sailors and fishermen. Brizo was also known as an oracular deity specialized in oneiromancy.

Her name gradually became a rare common noun, brizomantis (βριζόμαντις), which was used to describe a seer specialized in the interpretation of dreams.

== Etymology ==
The name Brizo, in ancient greek Βριζώ / Brizṓ, derives from the verb βρίζω, signifying « to slumber ».

== Worship ==
According to the hellenistic author Semus of Delos, Brizo was worshipped by the women of Delos, who set out food offerings for her in small boats. The goddess would accept anything but fish. Prayers were addressed to her to grant everything that was good, but especially to safeguard ships. Along with the offerings, Lillian Lawler has suggested that a dance was done by Delian sailors to honour the goddess.

Brizo also granted oracular dreams. Historian Philippe Bruneau has suggested that the people of Delos maybe slept in a dedicated oracular shrine to receive prophetic dreams from the goddess. Other historians have argued that they potentially made those dreams while sleeping in their own homes. Given the maritime nature of Brizo's cult, it is highly likely that the Delians who experienced those oracular dreams were people about to set sail and women whose husbands were lost at sea.
