= Shota Taguchi =

Japanese actor (born 2004)

- 田口 翔大
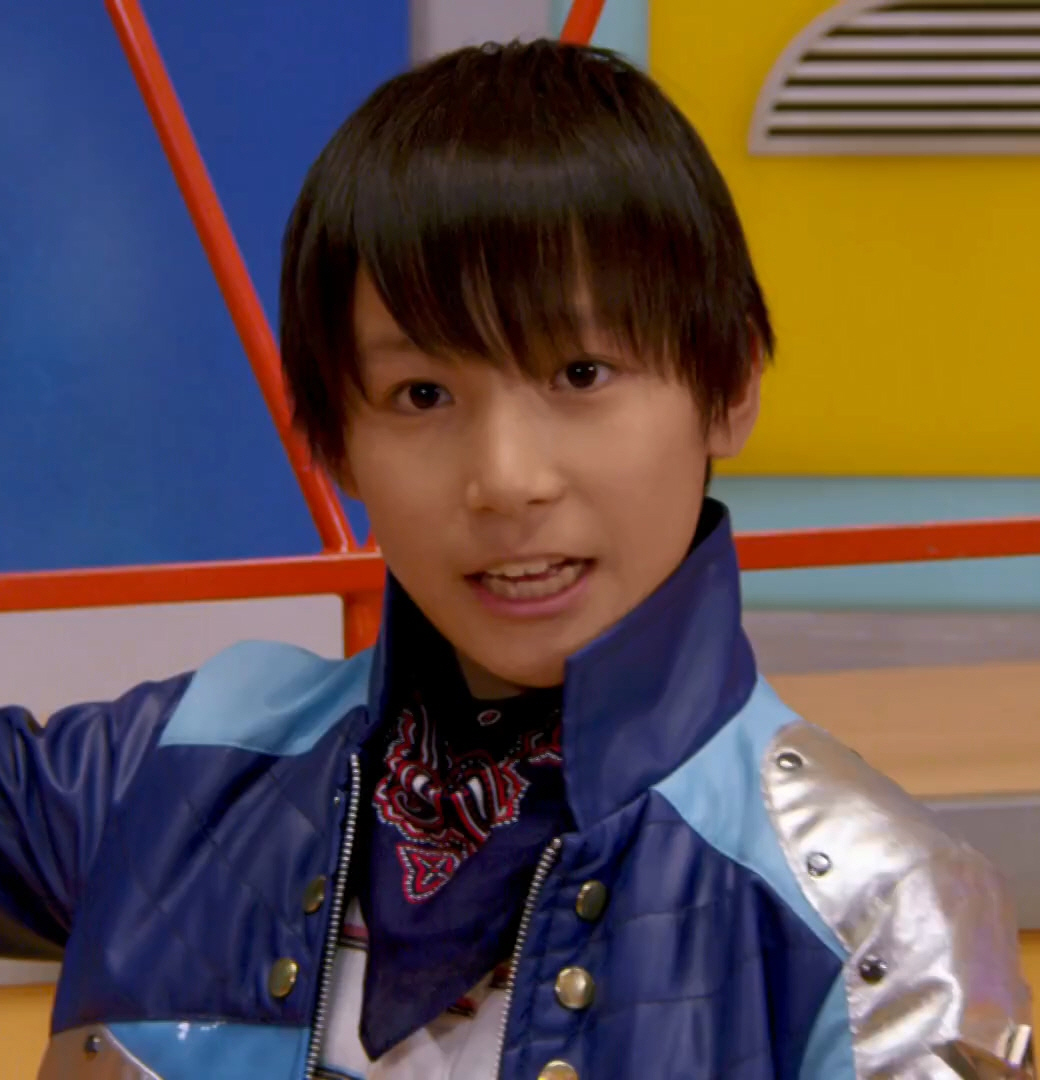
- 2017
- Born: 16 June 2004 (age 22); Saitama Prefecture, Japan
- Occupation: Actor
- Years active: 2009–present
- Height: 177 cm (5 ft 10 in)

Shota Taguchi (田口 翔大, Taguchi Shōta; born 16 June 2004) is a Japanese actor.

== Biography ==
Taguchi was born in Saitama Prefecture. His mother was a big fan of Masaharu Fukuyama. When Taguchi was four years old, while he was not aware, his mother applied and recruited for Amuse's Amuse Kids (a child department) in which the agency belonged to Fukuyama and became affiliated.

His first main role on TV is Kotaro Sakuma/Koguma Sky Blue on Uchu Sentai Kyuranger in 2017.

On March 31, 2020, due to the Taguchi's contract expiration, he left the agency.

== Personal life ==
Because he was closely watching Kamen Rider Den-O, Taguchi liked Takeru Satoh and belonged to Amuse.

Director Yukihiko Tsutsumi commented that "when I said 'Do it like this,' I will do as it is, so I thought 'perhaps it is over 30 years old.'"

In Uchuu Sentai Kyuuranger, he doesn't know that he got the hero role because he ignored the audition requirements, and thought he was just a guest on his first appearance. The staff cast of this work also highly appreciate Taguchi's acting skills and attitude towards work.

== Filmography ==
=== Films ===
Year	Title	Role
2015	The Big Bee	Takahiko Yuhara
2016	Desperate Sunflowers	Kōichi Kumada
2016	L	Oves (young)
2017	Uchu Sentai Kyuranger the Movie: Geth Indaver Strikes Back	Kotaro Sakuma/Koguma Sky Blue (voice)
2018	The Travelling Cat Chronicles	Satoru Miyawaki (young)

=== Television dramas ===
Date	Title	Role	Network	Notes	Ref.
2012	GTO	Kunio Murai (young)	KTV	Episode 3	
2012	Keigo Higashino Mysteries: Reiko and Reiko		Fuji TV		
2013	Doyō Wide Gekijō: Onsen Waka-okami no Satsujin Suiri 26	Haruto Yagi	TV Asahi		
2015	Hana Moyu	Einoshin	NHK		
2016	Medical Team: Lady da Vinci no Shindan	Shōta	Fuji TV	Episode 8	
2017	Uchu Sentai Kyuranger	Kotaro Sakuma/Koguma Sky Blue (voice)	TV Asahi		
2019	Keiji Zero	Haruto Nakao	TV Asahi	Episode 6	
2019	Strawberry Night Saga	Noriyuki Hayama (young)	Fuji TV	Episode 6	

=== Internet dramas ===
Year	Title	Role	Website
2017	Kamen Rider Amazons Season 2	Chihiro (young)	Amazon Prime Video
2017	Gin Tama: Mitsuba-hen	Sougo Okita (young)	dTV
2017	From Episode of Stinger: Uchu Sentai Kyuranger: High School Wars	Kotaro Sakuma/Koguma Sky Blue (voice)	Toei Tokusatsu Fan Club

=== Audio dramas ===
Date	Title	Role
2017	Uchu Sentai Kyuranger: Make Him Cry! The Tamakyu Troupe Hot Match!	Kotaro Sakuma/Koguma Sky Blue

=== Music videos ===
Artist	Title
Tiara	"Tadaima to Ieru made"

=== Advertisements ===
Brand	Product	Title
2010	Hagoromo Foods	Spaghetti Gratin
2010	Kao Corporation	Humming Neo
2011	Bandai	CharaDeco: Kamen Rider
2013	Panasonic	Digital Video Camera: Aijō Size
2013	McDonald's	Happy Set: Doraemon
2019	Bandai	Unlimitiv: Tomodachi no Mesen-hen

=== Magazines ===
Year	Title	Issue
2010	Mebae	
2010	Yōchien	
2012	Shōgaku Ichinensei	August 2012

== Discography ==
"Blue Sky Boy" (2017) was sung by Taguchi under the name of his character Kotaro Sakuma/Koguma Sky Blue.
