= Sakura Miyajima =

Japanese taranto & singer (born 1983)

- 宮島 咲良
- Born: November 9, 1983 (age 42); Edogawa, Tokyo, Japan
- Other name: Sakura Miyamiya (さくら みやみや)
- Education: Kyoritsu Women's University
- Occupations: Tarento, announcer, singer
- Years active: 1999–present
- Agent: Watanabe Entertainment
- Website: www.watanabepro.co.jp/mypage/artist/miyajimasakura.html

Sakura Miyajima (宮島 咲良, Miyajima Sakura; born 9 November 1983) is a Japanese tarento, free announcer, and singer.

Miyajima is represented with Watanabe Entertainment. She graduated from Tokyo Metropolitan Ryōgoku High School and Kyoritsu Women's University.

== Current appearances ==
=== TV series ===
Year	Title	Network	Notes	Ref.
	Momochi Hama Store	TNC	Thursday appearances	
2012	Kira Kawa Joshi-bu	TVQ		
2013	Boxing Legends: Seiki no Issen	Fuji TV Next		
2014	Kids Gekijō Ace	TVK	Song sister	
2020	Mashin Sentai Kiramager	TV Asahi	Aquarium Guide	episode 21

=== Radio ===
Year	Title	Network	Notes
2014	Tegomass no Rajio	MBS Radio	Assistant
2016	J Pop N' Rocks	FM Fuji	

=== Narration ===
Year	Title	Network
2014	Shoko Nakagawa no Anime ga Kōgi da!	NotTV

== Former appearances ==
=== During college ===
Year	Title	Network	Notes
2005	Anatama	TV Asa Channel	Oldest member at the time
2006	Ueda-channel	TV Asa Channel	Guest
2006	Oha Ten	Weathernews	Caster

=== As a KBC announcer ===
TV series

Year	Title	Network	Notes
2007	Asadesu. KBC		Appeared in "Kirari Sports" on Fridays
2008	Kimamani LB		MC
2008	The Omoshiro News Grandprix	TV Asahi	
2009	Duòmo		Reporter
2009	"P" SMA	TV Asahi	

Radio

Year	Title	Network	Notes
2007	Sakura-iro no Ongaku Emaki		
2007	KBS Radio Charity Musicthon		MC
2008	VeroVero Va		Wednesday appearances
2010	YAG Anime Labo	NBS	

=== After affiliating with Watanabe Entertainment ===
TV series

Year	Title	Network	Notes
2010	HachiNavi Plus: Gyugyutto!	TNC	Thursday reporter
2010	Entame Samurai	TVQ	
2010	Geki Push!	TVQ	
	Data Sommelier Masahiko Nishimura	FBS	
2011	Nobinobi! Kamanbēro	TVQ	
2015	Music Nyutto.	NotTV	MC on Mondays and Wednesdays
2016	Morning Charge!		
2016	Chokugeki! Coliseum!! Subatto! TV		

Radio

Year	Title	Network	Notes
2010	Dr. Copa no Golden no Tobira	KBC Radio	
2012	Yoyogi Pirates Tuesday Music Magazine	FM Fuji	
2013	Bibiru 25	Tokyo FM	
2013	Sakura's Invitation	InterFM	Once a month
2013	Event 80 Navi	Tokyo FM	
2014	Slash & Burn	FM Fuji	Wednesday and Thursday appearances

Internet

Year	Title	Website
2014	Sakura, Sakiko no Futari Bocchi Radio	AmebaStudio
2014	Sakura, Sakiko no Kimagure Hōsōkyoku: Radio Fūmi o Soete	AmebaStudio
2014	Sakura Miyajima Tandoku Premium Hōsō	AmebaStudio
2015	Kamen Rider 4: Haishin Zenyasai	Niconico Live
2015	Sakiko Matsui to Sakura Miyajima no: Doyō no Yoru wa Nama Nyutto. with Momo Hashizume	Niconico Live

Stage

Year	Title
2011	The Dead-end

== Discography ==
=== CD ===
Title	Notes	Ref.
"Hello Hello / Shiroi Page"	Kutsudaru. opening and ending themes	
Mini-album Shuriken Sentai Ninninger	Sang "Shinobazu Wasshoi! Shurikenjin"	

=== Original video narration ===
Title
Akebono
Kantō no Kansen o Sasaeru Ressha: Ōmiya, Toyota, Matsumoto
485-kei to Inaho: Tōhoku Hokuriku
Shindai Tokkyū: Hokutosei, Akebono
Shindai Tokkyū: Cassiopeia Twilight Express
Myōkō-gō 183-kei, 189-kei
Tokkyū Ōhyakka: Higashinihon, Kantō
Tokkyū Ōhyakka: Higashinihon, Tōhoku
Tokkyū Ōhyakka: Nishinihon Chūbu
Tokkyū Ōhyakka: Nishinihon Kinki Chūgoku

=== Choruses ===
Title
"Dragon Ball Heroes: Jaaku Ryū Mission Shudaika"

=== Unreleased ===
Title	Notes
"Gu, Mō!"	Kids Gekijō! theme song
