= Taiki Yamazaki =

Japanese actor (born 1995)

- 山崎 大輝
- Born: 3 October 1995 (age 30); Shizuoka, Japan
- Other names: Light (らいとっ, Raito)
- Occupations: Actor; singer; tarento
- Years active: 2011–present
- Agent: Imagene
- Notable work: Nintama Rantarō Dai San-dan –Sanzokutoride ni Sennyū seyo–
- Style: Stage; film; television programmes
- Height: 180 cm (5 ft 11 in)
- Awards: 23rd Junon Super Boy Contest Special Jury Prize
- Website: Official profile

Taiki Yamazaki (山崎 大輝, Yamazaki Taiki; born 3 October 1995, in Shizuoka Prefecture) is a Japanese actor, singer and tarento. He is currently employed by Imagene.

== Biography ==
- In 2010 Yamazaki competed in the 23rd Junon Super Boy Contest. During the final examination performance held in November he sang L'Arc-en-Ciel's "Caress of Venus", and won the Special Jury Prize.
- In March 2011 Yamazaki announced that he is affiliated with Itoh Company.
- In May 2012 he formed the cheering squad Tower Boys at Tokyo Tower along with Yuta Higuchi and Daisuke Iku, who share the same office as him. Throughout 2012 and 2013 the group performed a variety of events monthly at the tower.
- Yamazaki's first leading role in stage was the Initial Film play Anata ni okuru Kiss 2 (performed from 9 to 13 July 2014 at Roppongi Actor's Theater).
- On 10 June 2015 London Kage Kitan Sherlock Holmes lead actor Yuta Higuchi announced that he stepped down due to his poor physical condition. As a result, it was announced that Yamazaki will become his understudy. There was also a change on the 14 where he had to play the role of Wiggins for two days.

== Filmography ==
| Year | Title | Role | Notes | Ref. |
|---|---|---|---|---|
| 2011 | Junon Boy Geki Otoko | | | |
| 2012 | Nintama Rantarō Dai San-dan –Sanzokutoride ni Sennyū seyo– | Heisuke Kukuchi | | |
| 2012 | Nintama Rantarō Dai San-dan –Sanzokutoride ni Sennyū seyo– Saien | Heisuke Kukuchi | | |
| 2012 | High at Tokyo | Taiki Yamazaki | | |
| 2013 | Nintama Rantarō Dai Shi-dan –Saikyō Keikaku o Abakidase!!– | Heisuke Kukuchi | Guest | |
| 2013 | Furachina Samurai | Yohei | | |
| 2013 | Nintama Rantarō Dai Shi-dan Saien –Saikyō Keikaku o Abakidase!!– | Heisuke Kukuchi | Guest | |
| 2013 | Ogre Slayer | Shichiro Yuki | | |
| 2013 | Not Hero | Shinji Kato | | |
| 2014 | Anata ni okuru Kiss 2 | Shina Sunagawa | | |
| 2014 | Amnesia re:again | Shin | | |
| 2014 | Sei Meiji Suwaru no Saiten: Anmari Kaburu to Okora re chau yo | Ichimatsu (Masanori) | | |
| 2014 | Ru Con: An'a koto, Konna koto atta de Show | Ikkun | | |
| 2015 | Nintama Rantarō Dai 6-dan –Kyōakunaru Genei!— | Heisuke Kukuchi | Guest | |
| 2015 | London Kage Kitan Sherlock Holmes: Ginpatsu no Shisha to Nana-ri no Yōgi-sha | Wiggins | | |
| 2015 | Nintama Rantarō Dai 6-dan Saien –Kyōakunaru Genei!— | Heisuke Kukuchi | Guest | |
| 2015 | A. & C. -Adult Children- | | | |
| 2015 | Diabolik Lovers | Ayato Sakamaki | | |
| 2015 | Nintama Rantarō 200-Kai Kōen Kinen Concert: Ninjutsu Gakuen Gakuen-sai | Heisuke Kukuchi | Guest | |
| 2015 | Nipponshi×Manzai: History's Japan | Dōkyō, Ikkyū Sōjun, Itō Hirofumi | | |
| 2016 | 2.5 Dimension Dance Live "Tsukiuta." Stage | Uduki Arata | | |
| 2016 | 2.5 Dimension Dance Live Tsukiuta Stage Act 2: Yumemigusa | Uduki Arata | | |
| 2016 | 2.5 Dimension Dance Live Tsukiuta TRI! School Revolution | Uduki Arata | | |
| 2018 | Ensemble Stars! Extra Stage ~Memory of Marionette~ | Shu Itsuki | | |
| 2021 | Thrill Me | "Him" (Richard Loeb) | | |
| 2023 | CESARE ~ Creator of Destruction ~ | Angelo da Canossa | | |
| 2023 | The Music Man | Tommy Djilas | | |
| 2023 | Ensemble Stars! The Stage -Party Live- | Shu Itsuki | | |
| 2024 | Sweeney Todd: The Demon Barber of Fleet Street | Anthony Hope | | |

=== TV drama ===
| Year | Title | Role | Network | Notes | Ref. |
|---|---|---|---|---|---|
| 2011 | Tsukahara Bokuden | Yoshitada's custom | NHK-BS | | |
| 2012 | Spec –Shō– Keishichōkōanbu Kōan Daigoka Mishō Jiken Tokubetsu Taisaku-gakari Jiken-bo | Tsutomu Ikeda | TBS | | |
| 2015 | Ramen Daisuki Koizumi-san | | Fuji TV | Episode 2 | |
| 2017 | Uchu Sentai Kyuranger | Naga Ray / Hebitsukai Silver/Dark Naga / Hebitsukai Metal, Echidna, Residents of Hebitsukai System | TV Asahi | Episodes 28, 31 (Echidna) | |

=== TV programmes ===
| Year | Title | Network | Notes | Ref. |
|---|---|---|---|---|
| 2011 | Kyōko-sensei no kūsō hoken-shitsu | NHK-E | | |
| 2011 | Waratte Iitomo! | Fuji TV | "Waga Sha no Uchi Oshi" corner | |
| 2012 | Monomane Grand Prix | NTV | Ikemen All-Stars Gackt "Vanilla" | |
| 2014 | Dai 56-kai Kagayaku! Nihon Record Taishō | TBS | Won the Newcomer Award alongside backdancer Yuki Tokunaga | |
| 2015 | Dō naru? Taiki Yamazaki –Kurayami Seikatsu– | Tokyo MX | | |

=== Films ===
| Year | Title | Role | Notes | Ref. |
|---|---|---|---|---|
| 2012 | Ring of Curse | | | |
| 2015 | Only 4 you | | Short Short Omnibus | |
| 2016 | Q-chan | | Short Short Omnibus | |
| 2017 | Doubutsu Sentai Zyuohger vs. Ninninger the Movie: Super Sentai's Message from the Future | Hebitsukai Silver (voice role) | | |
| 2017 | Kamen Rider × Super Sentai: Ultra Super Hero Taisen | Naga Ray/ Hebitsukai Silver | | |

=== Magazines ===
| Year | Title |
|---|---|
| | Junon |
| 2014 | StagePash! |
| 2015 | newbie! stage_02 |
| 2016 | click clap!! |

=== Radio ===
| Year | Title | Network | Notes | Ref. |
|---|---|---|---|---|
| 2013 | Radio −333 Fri. from Tokyo Tower– | Club 333 | | |
| 2014 | Dollar Radi | | Episode 17; Surprise guest | |

=== Video games ===
| Year | Title |
|---|---|
| 2012 | Junon Boy Collection Mobage |

=== Events ===
| Year | Title | Notes | Ref. |
|---|---|---|---|
| 2012 | Tower Boys Kessei Happyōkai | | |
| 2012 | Zero Mansion Show | | |
| 2012 | Tokyo Tower Amanogawa Illumination Tentō-shiki | As a member of Tower Boys | |
| 2012 | Club 333 "333 Tuesday" –Tré×Tren Tuesday– | | |
| 2012 | Summer Fes in Tokyo Tower | | |
| 2012 | Starlight night-high!!! | Guest | |
| 2012 | Haizai public commemoration event "Menso-re, Tokyo Tower | | |
| 2012 | Nama Otoko ch Kōkai Hōsō: Yā! Ogenkidesuka? | | |
| 2013 | Tower Boys Presents Special Talk & Live | | |
| 2013 | "Foot Bus" -Geinōjin Dansei Futsal Event | | |
| 2014 | Music On Tower | | |
| 2014 | Otoko Emi 2014 at Shinjuku Face | | |
| 2014 | Otoko Emi 2014 at Yokohama Red Brick Warehouse | | |
| 2014 | Zero Mansion Dai San-kai Kōen: Tenmen | After talk MC | |
| 2014 | Mezamashi Live | Back dancer | |
| 2015 | Taiki Yamazaki ga Ryōri Danshi!? | | |
| 2015 | Amnesia re:again DVD release event | | |
| 2015 | Ru no Jōei-kai | Night part guest | |
| 2015 | Only 4 you complete preview | | |
| 2015 | Only 4 you screening event | Guest | |
| 2015 | Sayonara Psychic Orchestra: Sekai no Owari wa, itsumo Natsu. | After talk guest | |
| 2015 | Amyune Fan Meeting 2015.11.1 | | |
| 2015 | Taiki Yamazaki X'mas a'... Birthday party! | | |

=== Others ===
| Year | Title | Website | Notes |
|---|---|---|---|
| 2014 | Yuki Tokunaga "Heisei Dodonpa Ondo" | | Music video |
| 2015 | Final Fantasy XIV Channel No. 7 Shinpei Season 2 Audition | Niconico Live | |
| 2015 | Dai 31-kai Cast Size News | Niconico Live | Guest |
| 2015 | Only 4 you public release live | Amesta | |
| 2015 | History's Japan special performance show | Ameba Fresh! Studio | |
| 2016 | Share!!! Koko, Asia no Tokyo nite | YouTube | As Taro |
