= Tetsuji Sakakibara =

Japanese singer & actor (born 1989)

Tetsuji Sakakibara 榊原 徹士
- Born: 6 December 1989 (age 36); Aichi Prefecture, Japan
- Genres: J-pop
- Occupations: Singer, Actor
- Instrument: Vocals
- Years active: 2009–present
- Labels: Yoshimoto R and C

Tetsuji Sakakibara (榊原 徹士, Sakakibara Tetsuji; born 6 December 1989, in Aichi Prefecture) is a Japanese singer, actor and fashion model. He is represented with Yoshimoto Creative Agency. He graduated from Kyoto University of Foreign Studies. He is nicknamed Tecchan (てっちゃん) and Tetsuji (てつじ). He is a member of the idol group Yoshimotozaka46.

On July 12, 2020, it was announced that Sakakibara had tested positive for COVID-19 and he had recovered from it 6 days later.

== Filmography ==
=== TV drama ===
Year	Title	Role	Network	Notes	References
2010	Peacemaker Kurogane	Yamazaki Susumu	MBS		
2010	Asu no Hikari o Tsukame	Tsubasa Sakuragi	THK		
2011	Mei Tantei Conan Drama Special Shinichi Kudo e no Chōsen-jō: Kaichō Densetsu no Nazo	Ryoji Wakura	NTV		
2015	Itsutsu-boshi Tourist: Saikō no Tabi, go Annai Shimasu!!	Higashida	YTV	Episode 8	
2016	Nekosamurai-dama Nojō: Edo e Iku		Tō-Mei-Han Net 6		
2016	Asa ga Kuru	Ryota Ando	THK		
2017	Uchu Sentai Kyuranger	Spada / Kajiki Yellow	TV Asahi		
2021	Kamen Rider Revice		TV Asahi	Episode 9, 10, & Final	

=== Films ===
Year	Title
2014	Oh! Father

=== Stage ===
Year	Title	Role	Notes	Ref.
2011	Cocansetsu! Saien			
2012	Ningyohime	Deepsea		
2012	Nobunaga			
2012	Koibito-tachi no Shinwa: Ni-maku			
2012	Yami no Kōtaishi	Ryo Tenjin		
2013	Fuyu no Nezumi			
2013	Re-	Minamoto no Yoshitsune		
