= List of Kamen Rider Revice characters =

Kamen Rider Revice (仮面ライダーリバイス, Kamen Raidā Ribaisu) is a Japanese tokusatsu series that serves as the 32nd installment in the Kamen Rider franchise and the third entry in the Reiwa era.

== Main characters ==
=== Kamen Rider Revice ===
Kamen Rider Revice is the eponymous duo of Ikki Igarashi and his inner demon partner Vice whose arsenal revolves around Vistamps (バイスタンプ, Baisutanpu), a series of rubber stamp-like devices reverse-engineered from the Giff Stamp (ギフスタンプ, Gifu Sutanpu) and designed to harness the power of inner demons as well as channel the Vistamps' genetic memory. Utilizing the Rex (レックス, Rekkusu) Vistamp in conjunction with the Revice Driver (リバイスドライバー, Ribaisu Doraibā) belt, Ikki and Vice can transform into Kamen Riders Revi and Vice Rex Genome (レックスゲノム, Rekkusu Genomu) respectively. While transformed, Vice wears the Buddy Buckle (バディバックル, Badi Bakkuru) belt, which connects to Ikki's Revice Driver via the built-in Genome Receiver (ゲノムレシーバー, Genomu Reshībā), to gain a physical form. As Rex Genome, Ikki and Vice gain increased leg and tail strength respectively. They also wield the Ohinbuster 50 (オーインバスター50(フィフティー), Ōinbasutā Fifuti), which can switch between Gun Mode (ガンモード, Gan Mōdo) and Axe Mode (アックスモード, Akkusu Mōdo); the Gundephone 50 (ガンデフォン50(フィフティー), Gandefon Fifuti), which can switch between Phone Mode (フォンモード, Fon Mōdo) and Gun Mode; and the Osutoderuhammer 50 (オストデルハンマー50, Osutoderuhanmā Fifuti), which can combine with the Ohinbuster 50 to form the Revicelasher (リバイスラッシャー, Ribaisurasshā) sword. As Ikki and Vice are separate halves of Revice's forms, they can use the Remix (リミックス, Rimikkusu) ability to fuse into an animal-like state based on their current form. Additionally, the duo possess several other Vistamps, each of which is based on a different animal, and their corresponding Genome (ゲノム, Genomu) forms are modeled after a different past Shōwa, Heisei, or Reiwa Kamen Rider.

- Eagle Genome (イーグルゲノム, Īguru Genomu): A Kamen Rider W-themed auxiliary form accessed from the Eagle (イーグル, Īguru) Vistamp that grants Ikki superhuman senses, Vice flight capabilities, and both aerokinesis.
- Mammoth Genome (マンモスゲノム, Manmosu Genomu): A Kamen Rider Den-O-themed auxiliary form accessed from the Mammoth (マンモス, Manmosu) Vistamp that grants Ikki the use of the twin bladed Mammoth Gasher (マンモスガッシャー, Manmosu Gasshā) boomerangs and equips Vice with the twin forearm-mounted Glacier Shields (グレイシャシールド, Gureisha Shīrudo).
- Ptera Genome (プテラゲノム, Putera Genomu): A Kamen Rider Faiz-themed auxiliary form accessed from the Ptera (プテラ, Putera) Vistamp that grants Ikki superhuman speed and transforms Vice into a hoverbike for the former to ride into battle. Vice's version of this form first appears in the Kamen Rider Revice film of the same name.
- Lion Genome (ライオンゲノム, Raion Genomu): A Kamen Rider Kuuga-themed auxiliary form accessed from the Lion (ライオン, Raion) Vistamp that grants Ikki and Vice proficiency in melee and ranged combat, respectively, and both pyrokinesis.
- Megalodon Genome (メガロドンゲノム, Megarodon Genomu): A Kamen Rider Decade-themed auxiliary form accessed from the Megalodon (メガロドン, Megarodon) Vistamp that equips Ikki with the twin forearm-mounted Divine Fin (ディヴァインフィン, Divain Fin) blades and grants Vice the ability to fire shark tooth-like energy projectiles. This form first appears in the Kamen Rider Revice film of the same name.
- Jackal Genome (ジャッカルゲノム, Jakkaru Genomu): A Kamen Rider Ex-Aid-themed auxiliary form accessed from the Jackal (ジャッカル, Jakkaru) Vistamp that grants Ikki superhuman agility and transforms Vice into a skateboard for the former to ride into battle.
- Kong Genome (コングゲノム, Kongu Genomu): A Kamen Rider Fourze-themed auxiliary form accessed from the Kong (コング, Kongu) Vistamp that equips Ikki and Vice with a pair of self-propelling Kong Revi Puncher (コングリバイパンチャー, Kongu Ribai Panchā) and Kong Geno Bracer (コングゲノブレイサー, Kongu Geno Bureisā) gauntlets respectively.
- Kamakiri Genome (カマキリゲノム, Kamakiri Genomu): A Kamen Rider Gaim-themed auxiliary form accessed from the Kamakiri (カマキリ) Vistamp that grants Ikki the use of the bladed Kamakiric Arrow (カマキリックアロー, Kamakirikku Arō) bow and Vice proficiency in Northern Praying Mantis.
- Brachio Genome (ブラキオゲノム, Burakio Genomu): A Kamen Rider Zi-O-themed auxiliary form accessed from the Brachio (ブラキオ, Burakio) Vistamp that equips Ikki with the extendable Brachio Revi Band (ブラキオリバイバンド, Burakio Ribai Bando) and grants Vice superhuman strength.
- Neo Batta Genome (ネオバッタゲノム, Neo Batta Genomu): A Kamen Rider Zero-One-themed auxiliary form accessed from the Neo Batta (ネオバッタ) Vistamp that grants superhuman jumping. This form first appears in the crossover film Kamen Rider: Beyond Generations.
- Kangaroo Genome (カンガルーゲノム, Kangarū Genomu): A Kamen Rider Build-themed special form accessed from the Kangaroo (カンガルー, Kangarū) Vistamp that equips Ikki with a pair of boxing gloves and transforms Vice into a baby for the former to carry in his pouch-like pocket. This form appears exclusively in the Hyper Battle DVD special Kamen Rider Revice: Koala vs. Kangaroo!! Crying Out Love in the Middle of the Wedding Ceremony!?.
- Gold Spino Genome (ゴールドスピノゲノム, Gōrudo Supino Genomu): A Kamen Rider 2-themed special form accessed from the Gold Spino (ゴールドスピノ, Gōrudo Supino) Vistamp that grants Ikki ergokinesis and transforms Vice into a rice cooker for the former to make tempura capable of increasing his strength. This form appears exclusively in the Hyper Battle DVD special Kamen Rider Revice: Becoming Rider 2♪.

Additionally, Ikki can use unique Vistamps to achieve the following power-up forms:

- Barid Rex Genome (バリッドレックスゲノム, Bariddo Rekkusu Genomu): An upgraded version of Rex Genome accessed from the Barid Rex (バリッドレックス, Bariddo Rekkusu) Vistamp that grants Ikki cryokinesis and the use of the Reborn (リボーン, Ribōn) ability to create up to 10 giant constructs of his and Vice's preexisting Genomes' Remixes for combat assistance. While Vice initially remains in his Rex Genome, he compensates with the Barid Shield (バリッドシールド, Bariddo Shīrudo), a DIY weapon he built from the by-products of Ikki's transformation. Later in the series, George modifies the Barid Rex Vistamp so that Vice can assume his corresponding Genome on his own.
  - Volcano Rex Genome (ボルケーノレックスゲノム, Borukēno Rekkusu Genomu): The evolved form of Barid Rex Genome accessed from the Barid Rex Vistamp combined with the adapter-like Volcano (ボルケーノ, Borukēno) Vistamp that grants Ikki pyrokinesis, Vice a variation of the former's Barid Rex Genome while retaining his Barid Shield, and both the use of the Burst Remix (バーストリミックス, Basuto Rimikkusu) ability to summon a fire/ice hybrid version of their Rex Genome's Remix for combat assistance. However, using the Volcano Vistamp requires Ikki and Vice to be synchronized, as it will cause the former's transformation to burst into flames if they are not.
- Kamen Rider Jack Revice (仮面ライダージャックリバイス, Kamen Raidā Jakku Ribaisu): An imperfect fusion form between Kamen Riders Revi and Vice accessed from the brass knuckles-like Rolling (ローリング, Rōringu) Vistamp, which allows them to create elements for enhanced attacks, that initially swaps the duo's corporeal states before slowly fusing them together. If necessary, they can wield the Rolling Vistamp in battle.
  - Kamen Rider Revice: The eponymous evolved form of Jack Revice accessed from the Thunder Gale (サンダーゲイル, Sandā Geiru) Vistamp, which completes Ikki and Vice's fusion, that grants aero-electrokinesis. While transformed, they wield the Rolling Vistamp. Vice also gains a separate partially corporeal body after cancelling his and Ikki's transformation.
- Kamen Rider Ultimate Revice (仮面ライダーアルティメットリバイス, Kamen Raidā Arutimetto Ribaisu): Revice's final form accessed from the two-in-one Giffard Rex (ギファードレックス, Gifādo Rekkusu) Vistamp, which consists of a maxilla-like Side N (サイドN, Saido Enu) half used by Ikki to transform into Kamen Rider Ultimate Revi (仮面ライダーアルティメットリバイ, Kamen Raidā Arutimetto Ribai) and a mandible-like Side S (サイドS, Saido Esu) half used by Vice in conjunction with his own Revice Driver to transform into Kamen Rider Ultimate Vice (仮面ライダーアルティメットバイス, Kamen Raidā Arutimetto Baisu), that grants magnokinesis, self-duplication capabilities, and the use of the Final Remix (ファイナルリミックス, Fainaru Rimikkusu) ability to transform Vice into a soccer ball-like projectile.
- Kamen Rider Igarashi (仮面ライダー五十嵐, Kamen Raidā Igarashi): A fusion form between Kamen Riders Revi, Live, and Jeanne accessed from the Fifty Gale (フィフティゲイル, Fifuti Geiru) Vistamp that allows the siblings to use all of their powers and weapons at once. This form appears exclusively in the film Kamen Rider Revice the Movie: Battle Familia.
- Kamen Rider Revice Shin (仮面ライダーリバイス・真, Kamen Raidā Ribaisu Shin): A fusion form between Kamen Riders Revi and Vice accessed from the True Rex (トゥルーレックス, Turū Rekkusu) Vistamp. This form appears exclusively in the stage show Kamen Rider Revice: Final Stage.

While participating in the Desire Royale tournament in the crossover film Kamen Rider Geats × Revice: Movie Battle Royale, Ikki and Vice temporarily utilize Desire Drivers in place of their Revice Drivers.

==== Ikki Igarashi ====
Ikki Igarashi (五十嵐 一輝, Igarashi Ikki) is the oldest child of the Igarashi family who can become Kamen Rider Revi (仮面ライダーリバイ, Kamen Raidā Ribai). Originally, he was a promising soccer player who abandoned his career to live a normal life and help with the Igarashi family business out of guilt for accidentally injuring his friend Kōji Ikeyama (池山 浩二, Ikeyama Kōji), nicknamed "Zico", during high school. Additionally, he formed a contract with Vice to protect his family from Vail as a child, but repressed the memory. However, the Deadmans' threat on his family causes him to accept Fenix's offer to join them in their battle against the evil cult. Amidst their battles together, Ikki and Vice end up merging together, causing the former's repressed memories to resurface, and discover Ikki and his siblings are Giff's descendants. Furthermore, Ikki learns the contract he made with Vice as a child is slowly erasing his memories of those he considers family whenever he becomes Revi, though Vice sacrifices himself to prevent this. Ikki loses his memories of Vice as a result, though he rejoins the soccer team and resumes his normal life.

During the events of the crossover film Kamen Rider Geats × Revice: Movie Battle Royale, Ikki participates in the Desire Royale as a Desire Grand Prix (DGP) Kamen Rider, with his primary Form Raise Buckle being Beat.

Ikki Igarashi is portrayed by Kentaro Maeda (前田 拳太郎, Maeda Kentarō). As a child, Ikki is portrayed by Atsuki Morinaga (盛永 晶月, Morinaga Atsuki) in episodes 9-11 and 42 and Yurito Mori (森 優理斗, Mori Yurito) in episodes 25 and 42.

==== Vice ====
Vice (バイス, Baisu) is the benevolent yet mischievous and wisecracking inner demon who embodies Ikki's repressed desires and selfishness. As Ikki is the only person to perceive his presence initially, the latter's transformation allows Vice to become Kamen Rider Vice (仮面ライダーバイス, Kamen Raidā Baisu). Thanks to his contract with Ikki, Vice obtains a corporeal form, which he uses to assist and protect Ikki as their lives are linked and should Ikki die, he will also perish. Moreover, Vice has a habit of breaking the fourth wall. After Ikki acquires the Gundephone 50, Vice can enter its system, which allows him to communicate with people without transforming.

Later in the series, it is revealed that Vice first manifested during Ikki's childhood when Vail destroyed the first version of Shiawaseyu and formed a contract with the boy to protect Ikki's family. Ikki repressed the memory while Vice went dormant until the former acquires the Revice Driver in the present. Furthermore, Vice became a technological genius following his re-awakening, which he primarily uses to maintain Ikki's father's, Genta's, desire to promote Shiawaseyu through online videos. Eventually, after Ikki loses all memory of his family, Vice decides to play the role of a villain and force Ikki to fight him in a suicidal gambit to restore his partner's memory with help from his host's family and their allies, among other people they had helped. Following his successful self-sacrifice, Vice is memorialized by Shiawaseyu painting a rubber duck with Vice's face to serve as the bathhouse's "guardian spirit" and Daiji rebranding the joint Fenix-Weekend organization as Blue Bird.

During the events of the crossover film Kamen Rider Geats × Revice: Movie Battle Royale, Vice is temporarily revived and participates in the Desire Royale as a DGP Kamen Rider, with his primary Form Raise Buckle being Monster.

Vice is voiced by Subaru Kimura (木村 昴, Kimura Subaru), who also portrays a fictionalized version of himself in episodes 30, 31, and 50.

=== Kamen Riders Live and Evil ===
Kamen Riders Live and Evil are the duo of Daiji Igarashi and his inner demon Kagero, respectively, who usually share one body. Utilizing the Bat (バット, Batto) Vistamp in conjunction with the Two SiDriver (ツーサイドライバー, Tsū Saidoraibā) belt and the Two Side Weapon (ツーサイドウェポン, Tsū Saido Uepon), they can transform into their Rider forms.

- Kamen Rider Live (仮面ライダーライブ, Kamen Raidā Raibu): Daiji's Honduran white bat-themed Rider form accessed from the Two Side Weapon's Live Gun (ライブガン, Raibu Gun) mode that grants photokinesis.
- Kamen Rider Evil (仮面ライダーエビル, Kamen Raidā Ebiru): Kagero's brown long-eared bat-themed Rider form accessed from the Two Side Weapon's sword-like Evil Blade (エビルブレード, Ebiru Burēdo) mode that grants umbrakinesis.

Similarly to Revice, Daiji and/or Kagero can use Heisei Kamen Rider-themed Vistamps to assume varying Genomes, with the latter assuming dark Kamen Rider-themed forms.

- Jackal Genome: A Kamen Rider Ex-Aid/Genm-themed auxiliary form accessed from the Jackal Vistamp that grants superhuman speed.

Additionally, Daiji can use unique Vistamps to achieve the following evolutions of his Rider form:

- Kamen Rider Holy Live (仮面ライダーホーリーライブ, Kamen Raidā Hōrī Raibu): Daiji's super form accessed from the bayonet-like Holy Wing (ホーリーウイング, Hōrī Uingu) Vistamp, which is created from the incomplete Crow (クロウ, Kurō) Vistamp, that grants a pair of Innocence Wings (イノセンスウイング, Inosensu Uingu) and the ability to generate force fields.
  - Kamen Rider Evilyty Live (仮面ライダーエビリティライブ, Kamen Raidā Ebiriti Raibu): An evolution of Holy Live and Daiji's final form accessed from the bayonet-like Perfect Wing (パーフェクトウイング, Pāfekuto Uingu) Vistamp, which is created from the Holy Wing Vistamp, that grants a pair of Perfect Wings, pyrokinesis, and the ability to freely switch between the Two Side Weapon's modes and summon a shadow copy of Kamen Rider Evil for combat assistance. If necessary, Kagero can assume control of the form.
- Kamen Rider Live Marvelous (仮面ライダーライブマーベラス, Kamen Raidā Raibu Māberasu): A special form accessed from the Mega Bat (メガバット, Mega Batto) Vistamp in conjunction with the Revice Driver that grants a separate body for Kagero to transform into his final form; Kamen Rider Evil Marvelous (仮面ライダーエビルマーベラス, Kamen Raidā Ebiru Māberasu). While transformed, Daiji and Kagero wield the Ohinbuster 50 and Revicelasher respectively. These forms appear exclusively in the V-Cinema Revice Forward: Kamen Rider Live & Evil & Demons.

Daiji Igarashi and Kagero are portrayed by Wataru Hyuga (日向 亘, Hyūga Wataru).

==== Daiji Igarashi ====
Daiji Igarashi (五十嵐 大二, Igarashi Daiji) is Ikki's athletic younger brother and an honor student who volunteers to work for Fenix as a squad leader and the intended recipient of the Revice Driver before his brother, Ikki, gets ahold of it. Following the latter event and Hiromi Kadota's failed attempt to use the Revice Driver, Daiji is left traumatized. Although Daiji holds no ill intent towards Ikki, the former's desire to stand out stems from a mix of jealousy and an inferiority complex towards the latter, resulting in his own inner demon, Kagero, immediately possessing his body shortly before Daiji receives new Rider equipment from George Karizaki. Kagero attempts to use Daiji to kill Ikki and Vice, but Daiji becomes aware of Kagero's presence and initially struggles to keep the demon from hurting his family until he realizes that they have always looked up to him, allowing him to regain control of his body. Upon discovering he and his siblings are descendants of Giff and being separated from Kagero, Daiji settles his differences with the latter in combat, with Kagero seemingly dying in the process. This absence causes a detrimental effect on Daiji's sense of self as he is slowly corrupted by his own ideals. Following his colleague Akemi Mikoshiba's death, he betrays his family and allies to avenge her. To this end, he kills Akaishi, only to take his role as Giff's protector and attempt to form a pact with the demon, only to be thwarted by Vice. With Hiromi Kadota's help, Daiji realizes the error of his ways and reunites with Kagero. After helping Vice restore Ikki's memories, Daiji leads the merged Fenix-Weekend organization, Blue Bird, in the former's memory.

As a child, Daiji is portrayed by Atsuki Yamada (山田 暖絆, Yamada Atsuki).

==== Kagero ====
Kagero (カゲロウ, Kagerō) is Daiji's malevolent and calculative inner demon who embodies his host's jealousy and inferiority complex towards Ikki and trauma from overusing George Karizaki's Vistamp-based Rider System. At the time of his awakening, Kagero briefly possesses Daiji's body and secretly steals a Vistamp from Fenix. When George notices Kagero's presence within Daiji's body, he allows Daiji to transform into a Kamen Rider for the first time, allowing Kagero to completely possess his host's body. After the demon joins Deadmans, Fenix's executives and Daiji discover what happened and the former bar the latter's family from knowing until Kagero reveals his presence to them. While attempting to eliminate Ikki, Kagero discovers George used him to help Daiji regain control of his body before Kamen Riders Revi and Vice defeat him. Despite this, Kagero is able to retake control when his host becomes incapacitated. Gradually weakening after the Igarashi siblings discover their connection to Giff, Kagero acquires the Crow Vistamp and uses it to separate himself from Daiji so they can settle their differences in a duel. Daiji emerges victorious, with a mortally wounded Kagero giving him the Vistamp before entering it in order to heal. Kagero's absence causes Daiji to become unstable and more reckless and adopt the former's warped outlook on justice until Daiji eventually sees the error of his ways, fully healing Kagero.

During the events of the crossover film Kamen Rider Geats × Revice: Movie Battle Royale, Kagero and Daiji’s encounter with Keiwa foreshadows the DGP player’s downfall at the hands of his inner demon, which ultimately occurs during the early rounds of the “Creation” DGP tournament, much to their fears.

=== Sakura Igarashi ===
Sakura Igarashi (五十嵐 さくら, Igarashi Sakura) is Ikki and Daiji's younger sister, a high school student, and a karate-ka. Following Kagero's awakening and possession of Daiji, she develops a grudge against Deadmans for ruining her family and develops a rivalry with cult member, Aguilera. In pursuit of joining her brothers in combat, Sakura receives her own Rider equipment from a mysterious individual, later revealed to be an agent from the secret organization, Weekend. Following Giff's defeat and Vice's sacrifice, she plans to enter medical school.

Utilizing the Cobra (コブラ, Kobura) Vistamp in conjunction with the Libera Driver (リベラドライバー, Ribera Doraibā) belt, Sakura can transform into Kamen Rider Jeanne (仮面ライダージャンヌ, Kamen Raidā Jan'nu). While transformed, she gains the use of a prehensile ponytail. She can also use Shōwa and Heisei Kamen Rider-themed Vistamps to transform her inner demon Lovekov into varying weapon-like Genomes, which are as follows:

- Kujaku Genome (クジャクゲノム, Kujaku Genomu): A Kamen Rider ZX-themed auxiliary form accessed from the Kujaku (クジャク) Vistamp that transforms Lovekov into a pair of war fans.
- Turtle Genome (タートルゲノム, Tātoru Genomu): A Kamen Rider V3-themed auxiliary form accessed from the Turtle (タートル, Tātoru) Vistamp that transforms Lovekov into a bazooka.
- Hashibiroko Genome (ハシビロコウゲノム, Hashibirokou Genomu): A Kamen Rider Hibiki-themed auxiliary form accessed from the Hashibiroko (ハシビロコウ, Hashibirokō) Vistamp that transforms Lovekov into a scythe, which can extract humans from their Phase 3 Deadman forms.
- Tricera Genome (トリケラゲノム, Torikera Genomu): A Kamen Rider Agito-themed special form accessed from the Tricera (トリケラ, Torikera) Vistamp that transforms Lovekov into a pair of bayonet-like submachine guns. This form first appears in the film Kamen Rider Revice the Movie: Battle Familia.

Following Lovekov's evolution, Sakura gains the use of the King Cobra (キングコブラ, Kingu Kobura) Vistamp to fuse with the former and transform into her final form; Kamen Rider Invincible Jeanne (仮面ライダーインビンシブルジャンヌ, Kamen Raidā Inbinshiburu Jan'nu). While transformed, she is equipped with five bladed extendable Medusa Fringe (メドゥーサフリンジ, Medūsa Furinji) appendages.

Sakura Igarashi is portrayed by Ayaka Imoto (井本 彩花, Imoto Ayaka). As a child, Sakura is portrayed by Ayu Fukumoto (福元 愛悠, Fukumoto Ayu).

==== Lovekov ====
Lovekov (ラブコフ, Rabukofu) is Sakura's benevolent plush toy mascot-like inner demon and partner who possesses limited speech capacity, though she can speak full sentences in Sakura's mind. As a manifestation of the latter's weaknesses and childhood past-self, the former lacks her partner's combat capabilities but can be transformed into weapons for Sakura to use. While normally non-combative compared to Vice and Kagero, Lovekov can lash out at humans while being influenced by Giff's aura. Eventually growing tired of being put on the sidelines, Lovekov tries to evolve so she can fight alongside Sakura. Following her evolution at the same time after defeating Giff together with her siblings and allies, Lovekov can finally speak full sentences outside Sakura's mind.

During the events of the film Kamen Rider Revice the Movie: Battle Familia, Lovekov temporarily gains a teenage female humanoid form.

Lovekov is voiced by Miku Itō (伊藤 美来, Itō Miku), who also portrays a fictionalized version of herself in episode 31.

== Recurring characters ==
=== Shiawaseyu ===
The Shiawaseyu (しあわせ湯; Happy Spa) is a sentō run by the Igarashi family.

==== Yukimi Igarashi ====
Yukimi Igarashi (五十嵐 幸実, Igarashi Yukimi) is Genta's wife and Ikki, Daiji and Sakura's mother. Following Deadmans' first attack during Daiji's promotion ceremony, Yukimi is left temporarily hospitalized. It is later revealed that Yukimi was involved in early Deadmen-related incidents surrounding her husband's tragic life 25 years ago. Seven years later, following Vail's attack on the first Shiawaseyu, Yukimi and one of her husband's friends, Shōzō Irabu and Masumi Karizaki, secretly kept in touch while ensuring her children never learned of the incident until they became Kamen Riders and Vail returned in the present.

During the events of the film Kamen Rider Revice the Movie: Battle Familia, Yukimi's spiritual angel-like inner demon awakens to purify those of her children and create the Fifty Gale Vistamp so they can become Kamen Rider Igarashi.

Yukimi Igarashi is portrayed by Kurara Emi (映美 くらら, Emi Kurara). As a youth, Yukimi is portrayed by Sakurako Okubo (大久保 桜子, Ōkubo Sakurako).

==== Genta Igarashi ====
Genta Igarashi (五十嵐 元太, Igarashi Genta) is Yukimi's husband and Ikki, Daiji, and Sakura's father. He usually skips work to create promotional videos for the sentō. Later in the series, Genta's real name is revealed to be Junpei Shiranami (白波 純平, Shiranami Junpei), a former operative of NOAH who was involved in a near-fatal biking incident and Masumi Karizaki experimented on him to save his life. Following this, Vail emerged and murdered Genta's parents, leading to the latter joining NOAH to find the demon. Amidst his quest, he met and fell in love with Yukimi and received help from Masumi and Shōzō Irabu to leave NOAH, only to learn NOAH and Vail were involved in his parents' murder in the process. After Genta chose to start a family with Yukimi, Vail mounted a failed attempt on their lives before Masumi extracted the demon and sealed him in the Demons Driver. As a result, Genta lost his memories as Shiranami, but became able to survive without a heart as it was extracted alongside Vail. In the present, Hideo Akaishi helps Vail break free of the Demons Driver and re-possess Genta, forcing him into hiding with Irabu to protect his family while he struggles to suppress Vail. Before he does so, Genta entrusts his children to right his past wrongs and protect Yukimi in his stead in the event he sacrifices himself to stop Vail. In response to Giff's invasion, Genta volunteers to undergo a cell transfusion so the Karizakis can create the Giffard Rex Vistamp with the intention of sacrificing himself, though Genta survives the procedure and goes on to settle his rivalry with Vail.

Throughout the series, Genta has assumed the following forms:

- Kamen Rider Vail (仮面ライダーベイル, Kamen Raidā Beiru): Genta's first Rider form accessed from the Kabuto (カブト) Vistamp in conjunction with the Vail Driver (ベイルドライバー, Beiru Doraibā) belt that increases his offensive capabilities at the cost of being under Vail's control.
- Kamen Rider Destream (仮面ライダーデストリーム, Kamen Raidā Desutorīmu): Genta's second Rider form accessed from the Hercules (ヘラクレス, Herakuresu) Vistamp in conjunction with the Destream Driver (デストリームドライバー, Desutorīmu Doraibā) belt, which is upgraded from the Vail Driver by George, that equips him with six back-mounted Herclaw (ヘラクロー, Herakurō) manipulators. Similarly to Demons, he can also use Heisei Kamen Rider-themed Vistamps to assume varying Genomixes.
  - Komodo Dragon Genomix (コモドドラゴンゲノミクス, Komodo Doragon Genomikusu): A Kamen Rider Ryuki-themed auxiliary form accessed from the Komodo Dragon (コモドドラゴン, Komodo Doragon) Vistamp that equips Genta with the left forearm-mounted Komodo Dragonic Heat (コモドドラゴニックヒート, Komodo Doragonikku Hīto) cannon.
  - Crocodile Genomix (クロコダイルゲノミクス, Kurokodairu Genomikusu): A Kamen Rider Wizard-themed auxiliary form accessed from the Crocodile (クロコダイル, Kurokodairu) Vistamp that equips Genta with the right forearm-mounted Croco WizaRolling (クロコウィザーローリング, Kuroko Wizārōringu) drill.
  - Kong Genomix (コングゲノミクス, Kongu Genomikusu): A Kamen Rider Fourze-themed auxiliary form accessed from the Kong Vistamp that equips Genta with a pair of Kong Astro Breaker (コングアストロブレイカー, Kongu Asutoro Bureikā) gauntlets.

Genta Igarashi is portrayed by Shigeyuki Totsugi (戸次 重幸, Totsugi Shigeyuki). As a youth, Genta is portrayed by Masanari Wada (和田 雅成, Wada Masanari).

=== Shōzō Irabu ===
Shōzō Irabu (伊良部 正造, Irabu Shōzō) is a regular customer at Shiawaseyu who provides information on Deadmans to the Igarashis. Later in the series, he is revealed to be a spy working for an anti-NOAH organization who posed as a member of NOAH, through which he met and befriended Genta Igarashi and Masumi Karizaki 25 years prior to the series. Following Vail's attack on the Igarashis 18 years prior to the series, Irabu maintained contact with Weekend and acts as Genta and Yukimi's caretaker while initially concealing his true intentions from their children at their behest until Vail breaks free in the present.

Shōzō Irabu is portrayed by Yutaka Saigoh (西郷 豊, Saigō Yutaka). As a youth, Irabu is portrayed by Yuki Torigoe (鳥越 裕貴, Torigoe Yūki).

=== Fenix ===
The Special Government Agency Fenix (政府特別機関フェニックス, Seifu Tokubetsu Kikan Fenikkusu) is a government organization based in the Fenix Sky Base (フェニックス・スカイベース, Fenikkusu Sukai Bēsu) that Hideo Akaishi established to ostensibly counter the Deadmans' threat while secretly facilitating his goal of reviving Giff. Following his revival, Giff destroys the Sky Base, killing most of Fenix's operatives. The survivors transfer their operations to an urban development site called ARARAT in the hopes of developing inner demon removal stamps, only to create stamps that have the opposite effect and strengthen Giff. Following Akaishi's demise, Giff's proper defeat, and Vice's sacrifice, Daiji takes command of Fenix's remnants and merges them with that of Weekend's to form Blue Bird (ブルーバード, Burū Bādo).

==== Yūjirō Wakabayashi ====
Yūjirō Wakabayashi (若林 優次郎, Wakabayashi Yūjirō) is a stern commander who secretly cares for his subordinates. During Ikki and Vice's first transformation into Kamen Riders, Yūjirō was murdered by the Chameleon Deadman, who later assumes his identity.

Yūjirō Wakabayashi is portrayed by Kazuya Tanabe (田邊 和也, Tanabe Kazuya).

==== Hideo Akaishi ====
"Hideo Akaishi" (赤石 英雄, Akaishi Hideo) is a pseudonym of a millennia-old Aztec king who once led a kingdom in opposition to Giff before his people were wiped out. Akaishi formed a contract with Giff to spare the rest of humanity from the latter's wrath in exchange for serving as his emissary. The pact resulted in Akaishi becoming an immortal with a drastically slow aging process and the ability to become a Giffdemos at the cost of a deformed right hand, which he covers with a glove. He would later go on to become a NOAH researcher and a member of the US government's Department of Defense in order to secretly manipulate them into improving Giff's potential. 25 years prior to the series, he and his NOAH superior, Agariyama, worked with Vail to murder Genta's parents and use him in the organization's experiments until Genta, among others, leave NOAH. Following this and NOAH's destruction, Akaishi found Vail in the Demons Driver and stole Giff's casket to enact a new plan to facilitate Giff's revival. While publicly founding Fenix and becoming its director-general to cover his activities, he also secretly founded Deadmans and entrusted the newly recruited Orteca to serve as the cult's public face and watch over Giff's casket in his stead.

In the present, as Genta's offspring become Kamen Riders, Akaishi grants permission for the Demons Driver's field deployment to manipulate Hiromi Kadota and Orteca into eventually freeing Vail and sacrificing Orteca to revive Giff. Following Kagero's death, Akaishi manipulates Daiji into unknowingly disrupting his spiritual balance and defect to his cause. After making an enemy out of Hikaru Ushijima and being defeated by Kamen Rider Ultimate Revice, Akaishi sacrifices his immortality in exchange for Giff reviving him as a red Gigademos, deeming humanity beyond redemption and resolving to kill everyone. However, he is defeated by Hikaru and killed by a vengeful Daiji.

Hideo Akaishi is portrayed by Jun Hashimoto (橋本 じゅん, Hashimoto Jun).

==== Akemi Mikoshiba ====
Akemi Mikoshiba (御子柴 朱美, Mikoshiba Akemi) is a doctor working for Fenix. After discovering his true intentions, she is captured by Hideo Akaishi, who forces her to offer herself to Giff, transforming into a Giffdemos in the process. Despite this, her will remains partially intact. She is later killed by Akaishi to prevent the Igarashis and their allies from saving her and learning Giff's weaknesses from her, though she inspires Genta Igarashi to allow the Karizakis to give his son Ikki a Giff cell transfusion and create the Giffard Rex Vistamp.

Akemi Mikoshiba is portrayed by Sayaka Fujioka (藤岡 沙也香, Fujioka Sayaka).

==== Other members ====
- Tatsuhiko Tabuchi (田淵 竜彦, Tabuchi Tatsuhiko): A Fenix squad leader who joined the organization alongside Hiromi Kadota and Chigusa Yamagiri as cadets. Upon discovering Akaishi's true nature, Tabuchi evacuates former Deadman contractors from the Sky Base's rehabilitation center before Giff destroys it. Tatsuhiko Tabuchi is portrayed by Kiyotaka Uji (宇治 清高, Uji Kiyotaka).

=== Aguilera ===
Aguilera (アギレラ, Agirera), also known by her pseudonym "Hana Natsuki" (夏木 花, Natsuki Hana), is the Deadmans' acting leader who was groomed from childhood to become Giff's bride. Due to her lonely upbringing, she does not believe in love and views families as a deceptive happiness. While she later learns she is to become a sacrifice for Giff instead, with her body becoming his vessel, she initially accepts her fate until Fenix attacks Deadmans' base. After escaping, she transforms into a Phase 3 Deadman and feigns returning to Deadmans so she can learn Orteca's true motives. She also intends to willingly sacrifice herself to revive Giff, only to discover she inadvertently made herself incompatible due to being a Phase 3 Deadman. Following Orteca's death, Giff's revival, and the latter showing his true colors, a disillusioned Aguilera goes into self-imposed exile. Aguilera would later resurface to force Sakura to kill her, only to be separated from her Deadman form and have her humanity restored by Kamen Rider Jeanne. After realizing she should continue to live, Aguilera, who adopts her pseudonym as her default name, joins Weekend, refines her Vistamp to prevent Vail from stealing it while aiding Sakura and her brothers as Kamen Rider Aguilera, and eventually clears her name. Following Giff's defeat and Vice's sacrifice, Aguilera becomes an agent of the Fenix-Weekend merger, Blue Bird.

Throughout the series, Aguilera has utilized her personal Queen Bee (クイーンビー, Kuīn Bī) Vistamp to assume the following forms:

- Queen Bee Deadman (クイーンビー・デッドマン, Kuīn Bī Deddoman): Aguilera's monster form accessed from the Queen Bee Proto Vistamp.
- Kamen Rider Aguilera (仮面ライダーアギレラ, Kamen Raidā Agirera): Aguilera's Rider form accessed from the refined Queen Bee Vistamp in conjunction with the Week EnDriver (ウィークエンドライバー, Wīku Endoraibā) belt that retains most of her former Deadman form's powers. While transformed, she dual wields the twin Needle Kunai (ニードルクナイ, Nīdoru Kunai). Similarly to Jeanne, she can also use Heisei Kamen Rider-themed Vistamps to transform Devil Hana into varying weapon-like Genomes.
  - Buffalo Genome (バッファローゲノム, Baffarō Genomu): A Kamen Rider OOO-themed special form accessed from the Buffalo (バッファロー, Baffarō) Vistamp that transforms Devil Hana into a pair of wind and fire wheels. This form appears exclusively in the web special Kamen Rider Jeanne & Kamen Rider Aguilera with Girls Remix.

Aguilera/Hana Natsuki is portrayed by Hikari Kabashima (椛島 光, Kabashima Hikari). (Note: Credited under her old stage name, Yui Asakura (浅倉 唯, Asakura Yui), until the V-Cinema Revice Forward: Kamen Rider Live & Evil & Demons.) As a child, Aguilera is portrayed by Risa Kaneko (金子 莉彩, Kaneko Risa).

=== Deadmans ===
The Demon-Worshipping Organization Deadmans (悪魔崇拝組織デッドマンズ, Akuma Sūhai Soshiki Deddomanzu) is a demon cult and splinter faction of the military organization, NOAH, founded by Hideo Akaishi that has been active for 50 years and seek to revive the progenitor of all demons, Giff, by gathering six Gifftex (ギフテクス, Gifutekusu), or Phase 3 (フェーズ3, Fēzu Surī), Deadmen for a ritual sacrifice. To do so, they provide people with Vistamps to form a contract with their inner demon, manifest the latter as a Phase 1 Deadman, merge with it to achieve its Phase 2 form and fully integrate with it to achieve its Phase 3 form. Compared to the other phases, humans that become Gifftex Deadmen run the risk of being killed if they are defeated in combat, though they can be separated by Kamen Riders Revi and Vice's Volcano and Barid Rex Genome's powers. However, if a Deadmans member who was originally chosen to become a sacrifice for Giff's revival but became a Phase 3 Deadman instead, they are deemed incompatible as a sacrifice. Additionally, Deadmans members can also use Giff Junior Vistamps on the weakest of their followers to create Giff Junior (ギフジュニア, Gifu Junia) foot soldiers to aid them in battle. The Deadmans was initially based in the Deadmans Base (デッドマンズベース, Deddomanzu Bēsu), a repurposed airship with a nightclub-like interior, before it was destroyed by Fenix.

==== Giff ====
Giff (ギフ, Gifu) is the mysterious progenitor of all demons who thrives on negative energy and came to Earth several millennia prior to feed off the darkness of humanity, but came to despise them for those who fear him and abuse his abilities for selfish ends. Convinced by Hideo Akashi to spare humanity, Giff made him and Azuma loyal followers to manipulate humanity to ensure his conquest of Earth is unopposed. Giff then entered into a deep sleep within a sarcophagus-like chrysalis called Giff's Sarcophagus (ギフの棺, Gifu no Hitsugi) and arranged for NOAH to recover it 50 years prior to the series. After the organization fell, Akaishi retrieved the casket and entrusted it to a NOAH splinter faction called Deadmans and its leader Orteca, who seek to revive Giff via a ritual involving six Gifftex (ギフテクス, Gifutekusu) Deadmen and a designated sacrifice. While the Igarashi siblings disrupt the ritual and Fenix recovers the sarcophagus in the present, Giff absorbs the remains of the Deadmen and Gifftarians that the Igarashi siblings defeated over the course of their battles against the Deadmans. After bringing Orteca into his private dimension, which is Giff's metaphysical stomach where those sacrificed to him end up, Giff fully revives into his true form.

After Giff pulls Vice into his dimension, he adjusts his plans to exterminate all of humanity save for the Igarashi siblings, who he considers family, before Kamen Riders Ultimate Revice and Evilyty Live temporarily seal him within his dimension. Upon returning, Giff produces parasites from his cocoon and uses them to take over humanity's inner demons, with an enthralled Vice by his side. However, Vice destroys his sarcophagus to remove the demon's invulnerability before the Igarashi family's Kamen Riders destroy Giff, whose eyes end up in George's possession.

Giff is voiced by Kazuhiko Inoue (井上 和彦, Inoue Kazuhiko).

==== Other members ====
- Yasushi Kudō (工藤 康, Kudō Yasushi): A corrupt lawyer who joined Deadmans to improve his status by using the Kangaroo Deadman to help him and an equally corrupt judge rig trials they were involved in and extort anyone who figured out their plans. However, Kamen Riders Revi and Vice destroy the monster and his reputation before Kudō and the judge are arrested by Fenix. Sometime later, the Chameleon Deadman breaks out Kudō due to his high potential for becoming a Gifftex Deadman. After receiving the Saber Tiger Proto Vistamp, Kudō transforms into the Phase 2 Saber Tiger Deadman (サーベルタイガー・デッドマン, Sāberu Taigā Deddoman) in an attempt to get revenge on Ikki. Despite evolving into a Gifftex Deadman, he is defeated by the Igarashi siblings and spirited away into Giff's dimension in a state of suspended animation. Yasushi Kudō is portrayed by Gamon Kaai (河相 我聞, Kaai Gamon).
- Amahiko Haitani (灰谷 天彦, Haitani Amahiko): A corrupt psychology counselor who works with Deadmans by recruiting and blackmailing victims before creating duplicates of his personal Planaria Proto Vistamp to fuse them with weaker versions of his Phase 2 Planaria Deadman (プラナリア・デッドマン, Puranaria Deddoman) form in order to fulfill their contract and expand the cult's ranks. He also seeks to merge with Giff and become part of Aguilera's family as he harbors an unrequited love for her as well as form a rivalry with Sakura Igarashi after fusing her karate instructor, Seiko Ōmori (大森 聖子, Ōmori Seiko), with one of his Planaria Deadmen. While attempting to kidnap one of Sakura's friends and forcibly fuse them with one of his Planaria Deadmen, Julio fuses Haitani with it instead, though the latter survives and evolves into a Gifftex Deadman. Despite this, he is defeated by the Igarashi siblings and spirited away into Giff's dimension in a state of suspended animation. Amahiko Haitani is portrayed by Shuji Kashiwabara (柏原 収史, Kashiwabara Shūji).
- Chameleon Deadman (カメレオン・デッドマン, Kamereon Deddoman): A mysterious figure who used the Chameleon Proto Vistamp to assume a Phase 2 Deadman form with camouflage and shapeshifting abilities. He murdered Yūjirō Wakabayashi and assumed his identity in order to infiltrate Fenix and retrieve the Giff Stamp. After succeeding in his goal and evolving into a Gifftex Deadman, he attempts to ruin the Igarashi family, only to be thwarted by Fenix, defeated by Kamen Rider Revi, and spirited away into Giff's dimension in a state of suspended animation. The Chameleon Deadman is portrayed by Ayumu Kato (加藤 歩, Katō Ayumu) while Kazuya Tanabe portrays his Yūjirō Wakabayashi disguise.
- Kanae Motomura (本村 香苗, Motomura Kanae): An office worker who is loyal to Orteca. She allows him to sacrifice her in order to spawn a Gifftarian, but it is destroyed by Kamen Rider Jack Revice. Kanae Motomura is portrayed by Saki Kiyoi (清井 咲希, Kiyoi Saki).
- Chigusa Yamagiri (山桐 千草, Yamagiri Chigusa): A member of Fenix who was ordered to infiltrate Deadmans, but defected to them and became a double agent. Orteca sacrifices her to spawn a Gifftarian against her will, but it is destroyed by Kamen Rider Demons. Chigusa Yamagiri is portrayed by Kazusa Okuyama (奥山 かずさ, Okuyama Kazusa).

==== Gifftarians ====
Gifftarians (ギフテリアン, Gifuterian) are demons created when a human is exposed to the Giff Stamp that possess the twin forearm-mounted Faregud (フェアグド, Feagudo) blades and are more powerful than Phase 2 Deadmen. Upon exposure to the stamp, a human host will become enveloped in a chrysalis, which their inner demon devours to create a physical body for itself while the host is destroyed in the process.

Later in the series, a revived Giff uses the Giff Stamp to spawn Gifftarians (True) (ギフテリアン (TRUE), Gifuterian (Turū)), pure versions of the Gifftarians which possess the twin forearm-mounted Faregudard (フェアグダード, Feagudādo) blades and power on par with Phase 3 Deadmen. Giff can also merge a number of Gifftarians into a Hell Gifftarian (ヘルギフテリアン, Heru Gifuterian).

==== Giffdemos ====
Giffdemos (ギフデモス, Gifudemosu) are demons created when a human is exposed to Giff's energy. Giff can also create Gigademos (ギガデモス, Gigademosu), stronger versions of the Giffdemos.

==== Deadman combatants ====
Through the use of Vistamps and/or Proto Vistamps (プロトバイスタンプ, Puroto Baisutanpu), Deadmans materialize their human victims' inner demon to bring about their origami-themed monstrous namesakes, or Deadman (デッドマン, Deddoman), the renegade byproducts of NOAH's attempts at replicating Giff's powers for combat purposes. When a Deadman is defeated, their corresponding Proto Vistamp becomes purified and either becomes part of a Kamen Rider's arsenal or transferred to Fenix's custody. Through the making of a higher-class contract, a Vistamp user can merge with their Deadman to assume a Phase 2 (フェーズ2, Fēzu Tsū) form at the cost of their humanity and gradually transform into a Gifftex Deadman. If a Proto Vistamp is used on multiple hosts, the resulting Deadmen can merge into a Super Deadman (スーパーデッドマン, Sūpā Deddoman). Additionally, contract holders can use Proto Vistamps to create duplicates, use them on others, and continue to create duplicate Vistamps by summoning its corresponding Deadman.

- Mammoth Deadman (マンモス・デッドマン, Manmosu Deddoman): A mammoth-themed monster born from convict Tomoyuki Harada (原田 智之, Harada Tomoyuki) and the Mammoth Proto Vistamp. It is destroyed by Kamen Rider Vice. Tomoyuki Harada is portrayed by Minoru Suzuki (鈴木 みのる, Suzuki Minoru).
- Rex Deadman (レックス・デッドマン, Rekkusu Deddoman): A Tyrannosaurus-themed monster born from Hiromi Kadota using the Rex Vistamp during his failed attempt to use the Revice Driver without proper training. It is destroyed by Kamen Rider Revi.
- Kamakiri Deadman (カマキリ・デッドマン, Kamakiri Deddoman): A mantis-themed monster born from caddie Ibata (井端) using the Kamakiri Proto Vistamp that acts on its host's desire to get revenge on his abusive boss Araki for firing him. It is destroyed by Kamen Riders Revi and Vice while Ibata and Araki reconcile. Ibata is portrayed by Akinobu Shinoyama (篠山 輝信, Shinoyama Akinobu).
- Megalodon Deadman (メガロドン・デッドマン, Megarodon Deddoman): A megalodon-themed monster born from professional golfer Araki (荒木) using the Megalodon Proto Vistamp that acts on its host's desire to get revenge on Ibata for trying to kill him. It is destroyed by Kamen Riders Revi and Vice while Araki and Ibata reconcile, and the purified Megalodon Vistamp is transferred to Fenix's custody. Araki is portrayed by Kenji Hayashino (林野 健志, Hayashino Kenji).
- Kong Deadman (コング・デッドマン, Kongu Deddoman): A gorilla-themed monster born from Ikki's childhood friend, Ayaka Oketani (桶谷 彩夏, Oketani Ayaka), and the Kong Proto Vistamp that acts on its host's desire to get revenge on her mother Taeko (妙子) for neglecting her and focusing on her younger sister Miharu (美春). Ayaka hires an accomplice to throw suspicion off of herself before merging with her Deadman so she can kill Miharu and make Taeko suffer. However, Revice separate Ayaka from the Kong Deadman before destroying it and transferring the purified Kong Vistamp to Fenix's custody while Ayaka is hospitalized, with Taeko taking care of her. Ayaka Oketani is portrayed by Seiko Utsumi (内海 誠子, Utsumi Seiko).
- Lion Deadman (ライオン・デッドマン, Raion Deddoman): A lion-themed monster born from online streamer Masao (マサオ) and the Lion Proto Vistamp, which he received from Kagero. Masao has the Lion Deadman assist him in filming viral videos until it is destroyed by Kamen Rider Revi before helping Fenix lure out Kagero. Sometime after Giff's defeat, Masao restarts his online streaming career. Masao is portrayed by Takuma Usa (宇佐 拓真, Usa Takuma).
- Kangaroo Deadman (カンガルー・デッドマン, Kangarū Deddoman): A kangaroo-themed monster born from Yasushi Kudō and the Kangaroo Proto Vistamp. It is destroyed by Kamen Riders Revi and Vice.
- Cheetah Deadman (チーター・デッドマン, Chītā Deddoman): A cheetah-themed monster born from struggling hospital director Kōji Maezono (前園 孝治, Maezono Kōji) and the Cheetah Proto Vistamp. Upon discovering his son Hitoshi (仁志) was suspended from high school for stealing from fellow students to become a thief, Maezono fuses with the Cheetah Deadman to cover for his son. Hitoshi realizes both his suspension and thievery were his fault, but Maezono refuses to let him turn himself in until Kamen Riders Revi and Vice separate Maezono from the Cheetah Deadman and destroy it. Kōji Maezono is portrayed by Jun Hashizume (橋爪 淳, Hashizume Jun).
- Brachio Deadman (ブラキオ・デッドマン, Burakio Deddoman): A trio of Brachiosaurus-themed monsters born from a trio of unnamed scammers and the Brachio Proto Vistamp capable of merging into the Brachio Deadman (Type-Union) (ブラキオ・デッドマン(TYPE-UNION), Burakio Deddoman Taipu Yunion). (Note: The Brachio Deadman (Type-Union) is also called the Super Brachio Deadman (スーパーブラキオ・デッドマン, Sūpā Burakio Deddoman).) The Brachio Deadman (Type-Union) is destroyed by Kamen Rider Live. The unnamed scammers are portrayed by Hiroya Matsumoto (松本 寛也, Matsumoto Hiroya), Mizuki Saiba (西葉 瑞希, Saiba Mizuki), and Tetsuji Sakakibara (榊原 徹士, Sakakibara Tetsuji).
- Kurage Deadman (クラゲ・デッドマン, Kurage Deddoman): A jellyfish-themed monster born from an unidentified person and the Kurage Proto Vistamp.
- Harimogura Deadman (ハリモグラ・デッドマン, Harimogura Deddoman): An echidna-themed monster born from an unidentified person and the Harimogura Proto Vistamp.
- Oumu Deadman (オウム・デッドマン, Ōmu Deddoman): A parrot-themed monster born from an unidentified person and the Oumu Proto Vistamp. It is destroyed by Kamen Riders Revi and Vice.
- Shark Deadman (シャーク・デッドマン, Shāku Deddoman): A shark-themed monster born from entertainment agent Mayu Tominaga (富永 真由, Tominaga Mayu) and the Shark Proto Vistamp. Experiencing mixed feelings over being left behind by her clients and rising comedy group, Kuki Kaidan, and frustration over her staff's mistreatment of the comedians, Mayu spawned the Shark and Elephant Deadmen to help her secure a successful career for her clients, only to inadvertently put them in danger. After Kamen Rider Jack Revice destroy the Shark and Elephant Deadmen, Mayu apologizes to Kuki Kaidan before she is taken into custody. Mayu Tominaga is portrayed by Mako Komaki (小槙 まこ, Komaki Mako).
- Elephant Deadman (エレファント・デッドマン, Erefanto Deddoman): An elephant-themed monster born from Mayu Tominaga and the Elephant Proto Vistamp. It is destroyed by Kamen Rider Jack Revice.
- Rafflesia Deadman (ラフレシア・デッドマン, Rafureshia Deddoman): A Rafflesia-themed monster born from voice actor Subaru Kimura and the Rafflesia Proto Vistamp, which he spawned out of guilt for an incident between his students, Ikki and Kōji "Zico" Ikeyama, during the end of their high school soccer career. After learning that Ikki was losing his memories due to his fights with Deadmans, Kimura uses the Rafflesia Deadman to trap his former students in an illusionary dream world to make them reconcile with each other, which allows Ikki to partially regain his memories. However, Giff's influence causes the monster to betray Kimura and go on a rampage. After Ikki and Zico reconcile and wake up, Kimura willingly turns himself in to Fenix and entrusts Zico with continuing his voice acting work in his stead while Kamen Rider Revice destroys the Rafflesia Deadman. Subaru Kimura portrays a fictionalized version of himself, in addition to voicing Vice.

===== Other Deadman combatants =====
- Spider Deadman (スパイダー・デッドマン, Supaidā Deddoman): A spider-themed monster born from an unnamed office worker and the Spider Proto Vistamp. It is destroyed by Kamen Riders Revi and Vice. This Deadman appears exclusively in the Kamen Rider Revice film of the same name and the manga Kamen Rider Revice: My Brother Is Kamen Rider. The unnamed office worker is portrayed by Yamato Machida (町田 大和, Machida Yamato).
- Batta Deadman (バッタ・デッドマン, Batta Deddoman): A grasshopper-themed monster born from Junpei (純平), a lonely fan of Touma Kamiyama, and the Batta Proto Vistamp. It acts on Junpei's resentment towards his successful friends for abandoning him until it is destroyed by Kamen Riders Saber and Espada while a reformed Junpei willingly gives the Batta Vistamp to Fenix and accepts his friends' decisions to move on. This Deadman appears exclusively in the Kamen Rider Saber epilogue special. Junpei is portrayed by Yuito Kamata (蒲田 優惟人, Kamata Yuito).
- Orangutan Deadman (オラウータン・デッドマン, Oraūtan Deddoman): An orangutan-themed monster. Unlike other Deadmen, Tarō Gondawara uses a Monster Stamp to transform instead of a Vistamp. This Deadman appears exclusively in the special Kamen Rider Revice: The Mystery.
- Koala Deadman (コアラ・デッドマン, Koara Deddoman): A diminutive koala-themed monster born from an unnamed comedian and the Koala Proto Vistamp capable of creating human-sized Koala Deadmen. It is destroyed by Kamen Rider Vice. This Deadman appears exclusively in the Hyper Battle DVD special Kamen Rider Revice: Koala vs. Kangaroo!! Crying Out Love in the Middle of the Wedding Ceremony!?.
- Mandrill Deadman (マンドリル・デッドマン, Mandoriru Deddoman): A mandrill-themed monster born from Tony and the Mandrill Proto Vistamp. It is destroyed by Kamen Rider Chimera. This Deadman appears exclusively in the film Kamen Rider Revice the Movie: Battle Familia.
- Octopus Deadman (オクトパス・デッドマン, Okutopasu Deddoman): An octopus-themed monster born from one of Yūichirō Wakabayashi's comrades and the Octopus Proto Vistamp. It is destroyed by Kamen Riders Aguilera and Juuga. This Deadman appears exclusively in the stage show Kamen Rider Revice: Final Stage.
- Turtle Deadman (タートル・デッドマン, Tātoru Deddoman): A turtle-themed monster born from one of Yūichirō Wakabayashi's comrades and the Turtle Proto Vistamp. It is destroyed by Kamen Riders Invincible Jeanne and Demons. This Deadman appears exclusively in the stage show Kamen Rider Revice: Final Stage.
- Ookami Deadman (オオカミ・デッドマン, Ōkami Deddoman): A wolf-themed monster from an alternate universe, which resembles the Wolf Deadman Riot. It is destroyed by Kamen Rider Revi. This Deadman appears exclusively in the Hyper Battle DVD special Kamen Rider Revice: Becoming Rider 2♪.

=== Kamen Rider Demons ===
Kamen Rider Demons (仮面ライダーデモンズ, Kamen Raidā Demonzu) is a moniker used by those who utilize the Spider (スパイダー, Supaidā) Vistamp in conjunction with the Demons Driver (デモンズドライバー, Demonzu Doraibā) belt, which contains Vail and Masumi Karizaki originally intended to be reverse-engineered from the Vail Driver using NOAH's resources 25 years prior to the series before Fenix completed it in the present. Due to prolonged usage of the belt, Vail is eventually able to break free, though he maintains his connection to the Demons Driver.

While transformed, the user can generate Demon String (デモンストリング, Demon Sutoringu) for multiple purposes as well as stick to walls and ceilings. Using Shōwa and Heisei Kamen Rider-themed Vistamps, they can assume varying Genomix (ゲノミクス, Genomikusu) forms, which change and enhance part of their body. With incompatible users, the demon will only transform for short periods of time, limit them to one Genomix, and feed on their life force, which physically ages them at an accelerated rate as a side effect and causes them to develop an addiction to the Demons Driver's power. With compatible users, they do not suffer side effects and are able to use multiple Genomixes at once depending on Vail's mood. Additionally, users who already possess an inner demon are immune to Vail's powers, though said demon will be awakened following contact with the Demons Driver.

- Batta Genomix (バッタゲノミクス, Batta Genomikusu): A Kamen Rider 1-themed auxiliary form accessed from the Batta (バッタ) Vistamp that manifests a pair of Demon Bottom Higher (デモンボトムハイアー, Demon Botomu Haiā) legs.
- Mogura Genomix (モグラゲノミクス, Mogura Genomikusu): A Kamen Rider Amazon-themed auxiliary form accessed from the Mogura (モグラ) Vistamp that equips the user with the right forearm-mounted Demon Digzon (デモンディグゾン, Demon Diguzon) drill.
- Condor Genomix (コンドルゲノミクス, Kondoru Genomikusu): A Kamen Rider Joker-themed auxiliary form accessed from the Condor (コンドル, Kondoru) Vistamp that manifests a pair of Demon Rumble Joker (デモンランブルジョーカー, Demon Ranburu Jōkā) bird wings.
- Scorpion Genomix (スコーピオンゲノミクス, Sukōpion Genomikusu): A Kamen Rider X-themed auxiliary form accessed from the Scorpion (スコーピオン, Sukōpion) Vistamp that manifests the Demon Ridol Stinger (デモンライドルスティンガ, Demon Raidoru Sutinga) tail.
- Anomalocaris Genomix (アノマロカリスゲノミクス, Anomarokarisu Genomikusu): A Kamen Rider Black-themed auxiliary form accessed from the Anomalocaris (アノマロカリス, Anomarokarisu) Vistamp that manifests a pair of Demon Bladior (デモンブラディオール, Demon Buradiōru) claws.
- Quad Genomix (クワッドゲノミクス, Kuwaddo Genomikusu): A hybrid auxiliary form accessed from the Batta, Scorpion, and Anomalocaris Vistamps that manifests the Demon Bottom Highers, Demon Ridol Stinger, and Demon Bladiors all at once.

After George upgrades the Demons Driver to counteract Vail's connection to it and make it safer to use by making the user's inner demon power it, a user can utilize the Kuwagata (クワガタ) Vistamp instead of the Spider Vistamp to transform into Kamen Rider Over Demons (仮面ライダーオーバーデモンズ, Kamen Raidā Ōbā Demonzu). While transformed, they can use the right shoulder-mounted O Wingal Shade (Oウインガルシェード, O Uingaru Shēdo) mantle to fly while maintaining their Genomixes, though overuse of these will degrade the user's compatibility and awaken their inner demon over time.

- Mogura Genomix: A Kamen Rider Amazon-themed auxiliary form accessed from the Mogura Vistamp that grants similar capabilities as Demons' version.
- Condor Genomix: A Kamen Rider Joker-themed auxiliary form accessed from the Condor Vistamp that grants similar capabilities as Demons' version.
- Full Genomix (フルゲノミクス, Furu Genomikusu): A hybrid auxiliary form accessed from the Condor, Batta, Scorpion, and Anomalocaris Vistamps that allows the user to manifest the Demon Rumble Jokers, Demon Bottom Highers, Demon Ridol Stinger, and Demon Bladiors all at once.

Following Hikaru's successful transformation into Over Demons, George mass-produces more finalized Demons Drivers along with variants of the Spider and Kuwagata Vistamps to aid Hiromi in forming the Kamen Rider Demons Corps. (仮面ライダーデモンズ軍団, Kamen Raidā Demonzu Gundan), consisting of Kamen Rider Demons Trooper α (仮面ライダーデモンズトルーパーα, Kamen Raidā Demonzu Torūpā Arufa) and Kamen Rider Demons Trooper β (仮面ライダーデモンズトルーパーβ, Kamen Raidā Demonzu Torūpā Bēta) soldiers respectively. While transformed, both soldiers wield the Ohinbuster 50 while Demons Trooper α also wields the Osutoderuhammer 50.

The Demons Driver system is voiced by Kenjiro Tsuda, who also voices Vail.

==== Hiromi Kadota ====
Hiromi Kadota (門田 ヒロミ, Kadota Hiromi) is an impulsive and serious Fenix commander from Miyagi Prefecture who lost his father, Katsuya (克也), and was bullied as a child until he had a dream that inspired him to become a hero. To achieve his dream, he eventually joined Fenix and attempts to use the Revice Driver despite not having the proper training, only to be demoted to squad leader when his inner demon ran amok. After Daiji is possessed by his inner demon Kagero, Hiromi is granted use of the Demons Driver despite not being its intended user. Following the revelation of his superior Wakabayashi being murdered by the Chameleon Deadman, Hiromi succeeds him as the new commander of Fenix. However, Hiromi soon learns the truth behind the Demons Driver and of a conspiracy within Fenix, transforming one final time to aid in Deadmans' leader, Orteca's, capture before resigning from Fenix and revealing what he learned to the Igarashi siblings. Hiromi then learns of director-general Hideo Akaishi's connection to Orteca, only to be seemingly killed by the latter. While Hiromi survived, he feigned amnesia and returned to his mother in their hometown to recover. Upon learning of what seemingly happened, his allies work to recover his memories until he reveals the truth and, with aid from Wakabayashi's spirit, rejoins them to face Giff by forming and taking command of the Kamen Rider Demons Corps and briefly re-assuming the mantle of Kamen Rider Demons to save Daiji from himself. Following Giff's death and Vice's sacrifice, Hiromi joins Fenix's successor organization, Blue Bird.

Sometime after the series finale, during the events of the film Revice Forward: Kamen Rider Live & Evil & Demons, Hiromi regains access to the Demons Driver, which he can now utilize in conjunction with the Giant Spider (ジャイアントスパイダー, Jaianto Supaidā) Vistamp to transform into his final form; Kamen Rider Imperial Demons (仮面ライダーインペリアルデモンズ, Kamen Raidā Inperiaru Demonzu).

In the Beyond Generations side novel, which takes place in a dystopian future in the year 2071, Hiromi retires from being a Fenix officer and became a farmer when Diablo and his army of demons invaded Earth. At some point prior to Ryunosuke's arrival from the past, Hiromi reunited with the elderly George and gave him some of his harvested vegetables as a gift.

Hiromi Kadota is portrayed by Junya Komatsu (小松 準弥, Komatsu Jun'ya). As a child, Hiromi is portrayed by Zenta Umegaki (梅垣 然太, Umegaki Zenta).

==== Orteca ====
Orteca (オルテカ, Oruteka), formerly known by his real name Makoto Hatsushiba (初芝 真, Hatsushiba Makoto), is the co-leader of Deadmans and a former child prodigy who joined the cult due to feeling like an outcast and being abused by his father, from whom Orteca inherited an abusive attitude and superiority complex. Orteca initially manipulates Aguilera into believing she is the cult's leader and Giff's bride while posing as her right hand. When he reveals the truth however, she transforms herself into a Deadman and leaves the cult, forcing Orteca to alter his plans and restructure Deadmans. Despite being defeated and separated from his Deadman form by Kamen Riders Revi and Vice, and Giff subsequently absorbing his Deadman essence, Orteca allows himself to be captured by Fenix so he can trade the Giff Stamp to Akaishi for the Demons Driver, escaping as the new Demons. While Vail exploits Orteca to break free from the Demons Driver, he allows Orteca to continue using his power until they are defeated by Kamen Rider Holy Live, after which Orteca abandons Vail and retrieves the Anomalocaris Proto Vistamp while committing human sacrifices to hasten Giff's revival until he is defeated by Kamen Rider Revice and devoured by Giff. Months later, Orteca is freed by Kamen Riders Ultimate Revice and Evilyty Live and promptly arrested by Weekend.

Orteca utilizes his personal Daiouika Proto Vistamp to transform into his Daiouika Deadman (ダイオウイカ・デッドマン, Daiōika Deddoman) form, who wields the umbrella-like Paranegro (パラネグロ, Paraneguro) sword. After losing the Demons Driver, he uses the Anomalocaris Proto Vistamp and the Giff Stamp to absorb Giff and transform into his Anomalocaris Deadman (アノマロカリス・デッドマン, Anomarokarisu Deddoman) form, which also wields the Paranegro.

During the events of the film Kamen Rider Revice the Movie: Battle Familia, Orteca cooperates with George's plan to use the former and another Chimera Driver to break through the barrier surrounding Area 666 in exchange for a reduced sentence. He later attempts unsuccessfully to steal the belt, only to be re-imprisoned.

During the events of the web special Kamen Rider Juuga vs. Kamen Rider Orteca, Orteca escapes from prison through Shō Takada's help and acquires a mass-produced Demons Driver and the Kraken (クラーケン, Kurāken) Vistamp to transform into Kamen Rider Orteca (仮面ライダーオルテカ, Kamen Raidā Oruteka). While transformed, he can use secondary Kamen Rider-themed Vistamps to assume varying Genomixes that allows him to wield the corresponding Rider's personal weapon. He attempts unsuccessfully to restructure Deadmans, only to be re-imprisoned.

- Chameleon Genomix (カメレオンゲノミクス, Kamereon Genomikusu): A Kamen Rider Mach-themed auxiliary form accessed from the Chameleon (カメレオン, Kamereon) Vistamp that grants the use of the Zenrin Shooter.

Orteca is portrayed by Hayata Seki (関 隼汰, Seki Hayata). As a child, Orteca is portrayed by Takeru Ishida (石田 偉琉, Ishida Takeru).

==== George Karizaki ====
George Karizaki (ジョージ・狩崎, Jōji Karizaki) is an eccentric genius scientist whose father, Masumi, developed the Vistamp Rider System 30 years prior to the series, which can only be used by humans who have tamed their inner demon partners, especially those with Giff cells, and grants the latter a physical form through various different means based on the transformation devices they were given. George is a fan of Kamen Riders, especially those of the Heisei era, and designs Fenix's Rider equipment with them as inspiration. As a child, he unknowingly received Masumi's inner demon, Chic.

After Daiji defeats Orteca and Vail, George retrieves the Demons Driver and uses it to temporarily become the third Kamen Rider Demons, resisting the belt's temptation and unknowingly awakening Masumi's inner demon in the process. Following this, George upgrades the belt to work in conjunction with the Kuwagata Vistamp in order to transform into Kamen Rider Over Demons, stabilize it, and mass-produce the belt, only for Hideo Akaishi to break his arm. In response, George gives the Over Demons equipment to Hikaru Ushijima per the latter's request before successfully mass-producing the Demons Driver and entrusting the copies to Hiromi so he can form the Kamen Rider Demons Corps. Due to the varying crises he and his allies have faced, George moves in with the Igarashi family while his arm heals.

Following Masumi's passing and Giff's defeat, George resolves to create a new Rider System that does not need inner demons to power it due to being unable to reconcile with his father in time and while under Chic's influence. As a result, he creates the Chimera Driver during the events of Birth of Chimera and Kamen Rider Revice the Movie: Battle Familia before a freed Chic steals the belt and modifies it with one of Giff's eyes. George replicates Chic's modifications to create the Juuga Driver (ジュウガドライバー, Jūga Doraibā) belt to use in conjunction with the Juuga (ジュウガ, Jūga) Vistamp he engineered from Revice's Vistamps to become Kamen Rider Juuga (仮面ライダージュウガ, Kamen Raidā Jūga) and attack other demon-based Riders to prove his tech's superiority over them and his father until he learns Masumi did cherish him and used George's childhood drawings as the basis for the Vistamp technology.

In an alternate timeline depicted in the crossover film Kamen Rider: Beyond Generations, an elderly George goes into hiding after Diablo conquered Earth and creates the Cyclotron Driver to alter the past to avert this future from occurring. In addition to gaining Ryunosuke's help to get to the year 2021, George also uses his tablet to turn the time-displaced Vice, Daiji, Sakura, Touma Kamiyama, Rintaro Shindo, and Yuri into Clone Riders (クローンライダー, Kurōn Raidā) to defend Ryunosuke's body from Diablo's army of Devil Riders.

During the events of the web series Kamen Rider Outsiders, George develops the Zein Driver.

George Karizaki is portrayed by Noritaka Hamao (濱尾 ノリタカ, Hamao Noritaka). As a child, George is portrayed by Jin Hiraga (平賀 仁, Hiraga Jin).

==== Hikaru Ushijima ====
Hikaru Ushijima (牛島 光, Ushijima Hikaru) is a young Weekend agent tasked with working undercover as Tasuke and Kimiko's son and a regular patron of Shiawaseyu. As part of his work, he enrolls in Sakura's karate dojo in order to secretly train her to become a Kamen Rider, developing a crush on her and befriending Julio in the process. In response to Giff, Vail, and Hideo Akaishi's escalating attempts to enact a demon apocalypse, Hikaru convinces George Karizaki to let him become Kamen Rider Over Demons to help their allies. After Akaishi kills Kimiko and Tasuke, Hikaru loses his compatibility with the Over Demons system while defeating Akaishi and chooses Julio to succeed him.

Hikaru Ushijima is portrayed by Tomoya Oku (奥 智哉, Oku Tomoya).

==== Julio ====
Gō Tamaki (玉置 豪, Tamaki Gō) is Aguilera's loyal bodyguard and a former trading card otaku who joined Deadmans under the name Julio (フリオ, Furio) after discovering his best friend, Yōsuke Okuda (奥田 陽介, Okuda Yōsuke) was extorted by delinquents into betraying their friendship during their final year in high school. Despite becoming a Gifftex Deadman, Tamaki was not aware of Giff's intention to use Aguilera as a sacrifice instead of his bride and betrays Deadmans to protect her. Tamaki eventually forgives Okuda, only to transform into a Deadman Riot after Orteca sacrificed his friend to create a Gifftarian. However, Kamen Riders Revi and Vice separate Tamaki from his Deadman form, which is absorbed by Giff, and restore Tamaki's humanity in the process. Following this, Tamaki gains a job at Shiawaseyu and joins forces with Revice and their allies to defeat Giff. After receiving the Week EnDriver and the Buffalo Vistamp, he intends to become a Kamen Rider, only to lose the Vistamp to Vail. Nevertheless, in response to the Over Demons system rendering Hikaru Ushijima incompatible with it, Tamaki takes over the Over Demons mantle at the former's behest. Following Giff's defeat and Vice's sacrifice, Tamaki becomes an agent of the newly formed Blue Bird organization.

Tamaki utilizes his personal Wolf Proto Vistamp to transform into his Wolf Deadman (ウルフ・デッドマン, Urufu Deddoman) form, who wields the trumpet-like Rugir (ルヒール, Ruhīru) handgun. After losing control of his anger, he evolves into a berserker form called Wolf Deadman Riot (ウルフ・デッドマン ライオット, Urufu Deddoman Raiotto).

During the events of the crossover film Kamen Rider Geats × Revice: Movie Battle Royale, Tamaki utilizes the Giraffa (ギラファ, Girafa) Vistamp to transform into Kamen Rider Get Over Demons (仮面ライダーゲットオーバーデモンス, Kamen Raidā Getto Ōbā Demons).

Julio/Go Tamaki is portrayed by Kurodo Hachijoin (八条院 蔵人, Hachijōin Kurōdo).

=== Weekend ===
Weekend (ウィークエンド, Wīkuendo) is a mysterious resistance group founded by Masumi Karizaki and based underneath his family home that investigates Fenix and Deadmans' dubious activities through the Igarashi family. As such, they maintain surveillance over the family by finishing George Karizaki's Libera Driver for Sakura's use and creating the Rolling Vistamp for Ikki and Vice. Later in the series, Weekend uses the Libera Driver's blueprints to develop the Week EnDriver and train Julio and Aguilera in using it should anything happen to one of them. Following Giff's revival and the destruction of Fenix, Weekend publicly reveal themselves, provide temporary shelters, and urge the public and surviving Fenix operatives to help them face Giff. Following Giff's defeat and Vice's sacrifice, Weekend merges with Fenix, initially under the latter's banner before eventually renaming themselves to Blue Bird.

==== Masumi Karizaki ====
Masumi Karizaki (狩崎 真澄, Karizaki Masumi) is the leader of Weekend, George Karizaki's father, and a former member of NOAH who found the Giff Stamp and, using his son's drawings as inspiration, reverse-engineered Vistamp technology from it for the sake of world peace. After inadvertently giving rise to Vail and learning his fellow members Agariyama and Hideo Akaishi formed separate plots to use his Vistamps for sinister purposes, Masumi secretly transferred his inner demon Chic to a young George before he saved Genta by sealing Vail in the Demons Driver. However, these acts left Masumi ill and with disfiguring burns, forcing him to wear a mask. Despite this, he was able to fake his death and found Weekend to watch over the Igarashis as atonement for what he did to Genta. In the midst of Giff's invasion and helping the Igarashi family thwart it, Masumi's physical condition worsens until he eventually dies from his illness.

Masumi Karizaki is voiced by Shinshu Fuji (藤 真秀, Fuji Shinshū). As a youth, Masumi is portrayed by Kensuke Takahashi (高橋 健介, Takahashi Kensuke).

==== "Ushijima Family" ====
The "Ushijima (牛島) family" are Weekend agents assigned to work undercover as a family and regular customers at Shiawaseyu.

- Tasuke (太助): A Weekend lieutenant tasked with working undercover as Kimiko's husband, Hikaru's father, and a regular patron of Shiawaseyu who lost his real wife and daughter at the hands of Deadmen. He would later sacrifice himself to save Hikaru, Sakura, and Aguilera from Hideo Akaishi, so the former could join his real family in the afterlife. Tasuke is portrayed by Toshihiro Yashiba (矢柴 俊博, Yashiba Toshihiro).
- Kimiko (公子): A Weekend agent tasked with working undercover as Hikaru's mother and Tasuke's wife. She is later killed by a Hell Gifftarian while protecting civilians. Kimiko is portrayed by Nori (乃緑).

=== Vail ===
Vail (ベイル, Beiru) is Genta Igarashi's sadistic inner demon who represents the latter's bloodlust and displays a desire to destroy everyone and everything around him for his own amusement and to spite Genta, his offspring, and their inner demons. Years prior to the series, Vail came into being after Genta was involved in a near-fatal biking incident and Masumi Karizaki infused Genta with Giff's cells to save his life. Following this, NOAH ordered Vail to murder Genta's parents to manipulate him and ruin his life before using the demon as a test subject until he outlived his usefulness. Shortly after Genta married Yukimi, Vail tried to murder the former's new family, but Masumi extracted the demon and contained him in the Demons Driver. Following NOAH's downfall, former NOAH researcher Hideo Akaishi found a half-dead Vail and spent the intervening years working to free him. After being awakened by Giff in the present, a revitalized Vail manipulates the Demons Driver's users to facilitate his escape in order to re-possess Genta before eventually regaining his corporeal form and joining forces with Akaishi to force the inner demons of Genta's children to join them and betray their hosts. As his body approaches its limit, Vail decides to settle his rivalry with Genta by utilizing a dark copy of the Rolling Vistamp called the Crimson Vail (クリムゾンベイル, Kurimuzon Beiru) Vistamp to transform into a Kamen Rider Jack Revice-esque warrior of the same name, which ultimately ends in him being defeated and absorbed into his host. (Note: While Crimson Vail is not considered a Rider by TV Asahi's official website, the Premium Bandai release for his Vistamp addresses him as Kamen Rider Crimson Vail (仮面ライダークリムゾンベイル, Kamen Raidā Kurimuzon Beiru).)

In battle, Vail is capable of using the Proto Vistamps' power to counter most of the Riders' regular forms. Due to being separated from Genta by Masumi and despite Giff's power restoring his corporeal form, he uses regular Vistamps to prolong his dwindling existence.

Vail is voiced by Kenjiro Tsuda (津田 健次郎, Tsuda Kenjirō).

=== Chic ===
Chic (シック, Shikku) is Masumi Karizaki's inner demon and a mad scientist who the latter transferred to his son George years prior, having influenced George's eccentric behavior. First appearing in the web special Birth of Chimera and the film Kamen Rider Revice the Movie: Battle Familia, George accidentally frees Chic, who steals the Chimera Driver and one of Giff's Eyes (ギフの瞳, Gifu no Hitomi) in the hopes of creating an immortal army with Giff's genes in the forbidden Area 666 (エリア666, Eria Toripuru Shikkusu). Chic assumes a human form after killing and possessing Masato Sotoumi, but is defeated by Kamen Riders Live, Jeanne, and Destream prior to the destruction of Area 666.

Chic is voiced by Shingo Fujimori (藤森 慎吾, Fujimori Shingo) while his human form is portrayed by Norito Yashima (八嶋 智人, Yashima Norito).

== Guest characters ==
- Ace Ukiyo (浮世 英寿, Ukiyo Ēsu): A mysterious young man and undefeated champion of the Desire Grand Prix who can transform into Kamen Rider Geats (仮面ライダーギーツ, Kamen Raidā Gītsu). He appears as a cameo in the final episode of Kamen Rider Revice where he collects a Mission Box holding the Revice Driver Buckle from Ikki's bicycle. Ace Ukiyo is portrayed by Hideyoshi Kan (簡 秀吉, Kan Hideyoshi), ahead of his appearance in Kamen Rider Geats.

== Spin-off characters ==
=== Kamen Rider Century ===
Kamen Rider Century (仮面ライダーセンチュリー, Kamen Raidā Senchurī) is the duo of Hideo Momose and his time-displaced father, Ryunosuke, who utilize a Rider system that was created in a possible post-apocalyptic future in the year 2071, 100 years after the debut of the original Kamen Rider TV series, and 50 years after Fenix failed to prevent Deadmans' invasion. The Momoses appear exclusively in the crossover film Kamen Rider: Beyond Generations.

Utilizing the Cyclotron Driver (サイクロトロンドライバー, Saikurotoron Doraibā) belt, Ryunosuke's spirit merges with Hideo to transform into Kamen Rider Century. However due to the latter's inability to cooperate with his father, Century assumes an incomplete/berserker form called Kamen Rider Century Break (仮面ライダーセンチュリーブレイク, Kamen Raidā Senchurī Bureiku).

==== Ryunosuke Momose ====
Ryunosuke Momose (百瀬 龍之介, Momose Ryūnosuke) is a geneticist who joined Shocker as a researcher after being publicly shunned. While working for the organization, he participated in converting Takeshi Hongo into Kamen Rider 1 before attempting to desert Shocker, only to become a test subject for the Diablo Stamp and end up time-traveling to the year 2071, where he receives the Cyclotron Driver from George Karizaki so he can send his spirit back in time to the year 2021. However, this results in Ryunosuke's spirit being forcibly merged with his elderly son Hideo in order to facilitate his transformation into Kamen Rider Century. After reconciling with his son and defeating Diablo, Ryunosuke encourages Hideo to do the same with Shinichi before disappearing with the dystopian future.

Ryunosuke Momose is portrayed by Akiyoshi Nakao (中尾 明慶, Nakao Akiyoshi).

==== Hideo Momose ====
Hideo Momose (百瀬 秀夫, Momose Hideo) is a Shinkansen mechanic who hates his father, Ryunosuke, for abandoning their family and has a difficult relationship with his son Shinichi (真一, Shin'ichi) due to his job.

Hideo Momose is portrayed by Arata Furuta (古田 新太, Furuta Arata). As a child, Hideo is portrayed by Toshimine Kido (城戸 俊嶺, Kido Toshimine).

=== Shocker executive ===
An unnamed Shocker executive who appears exclusively in the crossover film Kamen Rider: Beyond Generations. After discovering the Diablo Stamp, he led his team to test it on Ryunosuke, but the resulting experiment forced them to lock it away before Fenix recovered it in the present day.

The Shocker executive is portrayed by Fumihiko Tachiki (立木 文彦, Tachiki Fumihiko).

=== Diablo ===
Diablo (ディアブロ, Diaburo) is a powerful demon that appears exclusively in the crossover film Kamen Rider: Beyond Generations. In the present day, Diablo is stopped by Kamen Riders Revi, Vice, Saber, and Century.

In an alternate future in the year 2071, where Deadmans succeeded in their goal of enslaving humanity, Diablo unleashes the Devil Riders (デビルライダー, Debiru Raidā) to attack Ryunosuke's comatose body, forcing George Karizaki to counter their threat through his Clone Riders.

Diablo is voiced by Yoji Ueda (上田 燿司, Ueda Yōji).

=== Crispers ===
The Crispers (クリスパー, Kurisupā) are historical figure-themed demons born from Crisper Stamps (クリスパースタンプ, Kurisupā Sutanpu) that Shocker created to guard five pillars of light to enact a ritual to fully resurrect Diablo, who absorbs the Stamps. They appear exclusively in the crossover film Kamen Rider: Beyond Generations.

- Himiko Crisper (ヒミコ・クリスパー, Himiko Kurisupā): A Himiko-themed monster stationed in Antarctica. She is destroyed by Kamen Riders Jeanne and Kenzan. The Himiko Crisper is voiced by Rica Matsumoto (松本 梨香, Matsumoto Rika).
- Khufu Crisper (クフ・クリスパー, Kufu Kurisupā): A Khufu-themed monster stationed in Egypt. He is destroyed by Kamen Riders Blades and Slash. The Khufu Crisper is voiced by Toshiyuki Morikawa (森川 智之, Morikawa Toshiyuki).
- Edison Crisper (エジソン・クリスパー, Ejison Kurisupā): A Thomas Edison-themed monster stationed in Easter Island. He is destroyed by Kamen Riders Live and Espada. The Edison Crisper is voiced by Ryūsei Nakao (中尾 隆聖, Nakao Ryūsei).
- Leonidas Crisper (レオニダス・クリスパー, Reonidasu Kurisupā): A Leonidas I-themed monster stationed in Siberia. He is destroyed by Kamen Riders Buster and Saikou. The Leonidas Crisper is voiced by Tesshō Genda (玄田 哲章, Genda Tesshō).

=== Nijitenka ===
Nijitenka (虹天花) is a lodge owned by Suzu Saionji that appears exclusively in the web special Kamen Rider Revice: The Mystery.

==== Suzu Saionji ====
Suzu Saionji (西園寺 鈴, Saionji Suzu) is the owner of the Nijitenka and a scientist who, following the death of her fiancé Shōgo Ueshima, became bent on seeking revenge on George Karizaki and his greatest creation, Kamen Rider Revice, as well as continue Ueshima's projects. As part of her revenge plot, she develops and uses Monster Stamps (怪人スタンプ, Kaijin Sutanpu). After luring Naoya Kaido to steal his Orphnoch DNA and complete her Oblivian Stamp, she attempts to kill George and Revice, but is defeated by the latter and arrested while George retrieves the Monster Stamps' data.

Saionji utilizes the Oblivian Stamp to transform into the monster Oblivian (オブリビアン, Oburibian). While transformed, she can mimic the abilities of monsters that past Kamen Riders have previously fought.

Suzu Saionji is portrayed by Rina Aizawa (逢沢 りな, Aizawa Rina).

==== Shinzō Hanawa ====
Shinzō Hanawa (花輪 真蔵, Hanawa Shinzō) is the Saionji household's caretaker and Suzu Saionji's loyal accomplice. After assisting Saionji in kidnapping Naoya Kaido, Hanawa is defeated by Kamen Rider Demons and arrested alongside Saionji.

Hanawa utilizes the Roidmude and Smash Stamps to transform into the Sword Roidmude and Stretch Smash Hazard.

Shinzō Hanawa is portrayed by Kazuhiko Kanayama (金山 一彦, Kanayama Kazuhiko).

==== Tarō Gondawara ====
Tarō Gondawara (権田原 太郎, Gondawara Tarō) is a freelance writer with a fraud-based criminal record and an occupant of Nijitenka. He assists Suzu Saionji in her revenge scheme until he is killed by Shinzō Hanawa due to him making money by selling the mass-produced Monster Stamps behind her back.

Gondawara utilizes the Deadman Stamp to transform into the Orangutan Deadman.

Tarō Gondawara is portrayed by Takashi Kodama (児玉 貴志, Kodama Takashi).

==== Other occupants ====
- Yasuo Samejima (鮫島 康夫, Samejima Yasuo): A restaurant worker with an assault-based criminal record. Yasuo Samejima is portrayed by Takuma Sugawara (菅原 卓磨, Sugawara Takuma).
- Misa Himuro (氷室 美砂, Himuro Misa): The Saionji household's maid. Misa Himuro is portrayed by Ayuna Nitta (新田 あゆな, Nitta Ayuna).

=== Shōgo Ueshima ===
Shōgo Ueshima (植島 正吾, Ueshima Shōgo) was a scientist, rival to George Karizaki, and Suzu Saionji's fiancé who appears exclusively in the web special Kamen Rider Revice: The Mystery. Ueshima developed the Monster Stamps and the Oblivian Stamp for Fenix's use. However, the organization chose George's Vistamps, causing Ueshima to go insane and die from overworking himself. Upon learning what had happened, Saionji vowed revenge against George.

Shōgo Ueshima is portrayed by Touya Morita (森田 桐矢, Morita Tōya).

=== Takako Kadota ===
Takako Kadota (門田 貴子, Kadota Takako) is Hiromi Kadota's mother who appears exclusively in the Blu-ray-exclusive special Dear Gaga. After Hiromi returns to their hometown, she nurses him back to health before dying from disease.

Takako Kadota is portrayed by Rumi Sakakibara (榊原 るみ, Sakakibara Rumi).

=== Yūki ===
Yūki (勇気) is a boy in Takako Kadota's neighborhood who appears exclusively in the Blu-ray-exclusive special Dear Gaga. A bullied child, he receives encouragement from Hiromi Kadota before standing up to his bullies.

Yūki is portrayed by Kanato Shōgaki (正垣 湊都, Shōgaki Kanato).

=== NOAH ===
NOAH (ノア, Noa; Nest Of Anti-Human), was a militaristic organization with government ties that sought to harness and weaponize Giff's power for military applications. Unbeknownst to the organization, researcher Hideo Akaishi manipulated them into unknowingly preparing for Giff's revival and humanity's evolution. Following Junpei Shiranami, Masumi Karizaki, and Shōzō Irabu's desertions and Agariyama's death, Akaishi led some of its operatives in stealing Giff's casket and the Demons Driver before forming Deadmans and Fenix to continue his plans.

==== Agariyama ====
Agariyama (東山) is the director of NOAH who appears exclusively in the web special Revice Legacy: Kamen Rider Vail. He arranged for Vail to kill Junpei Shiranami's parents to control the latter, only to be killed by the former after Vail first acquired a physical form.

Agariyama is portrayed by Mitsu Murata (村田 充, Murata Mitsu).

=== Kenta Katagiri ===
Kenta Katagiri (片桐 健太, Katagiri Kenta) is Ikki's friend and a wedding planner who appears exclusively in the Hyper Battle DVD special Kamen Rider Revice: Koala vs. Kangaroo!! Crying Out Love in the Middle of the Wedding Ceremony!?.

Kenta Katagiri is portrayed by Ren Kondō (近藤 廉, Kondō Ren).

=== Azuma ===
Azuma (アヅマ) is a man who formed a pact with Giff alongside Akaishi and appears exclusively in the film Kamen Rider Revice the Movie: Battle Familia and the web special Birth of Chimera. Eight decades prior, while serving as Giff's judge to determine mankind's worth, he became disappointed by humanity and retired from the world. In the present day, Azuma begins to lose his immortality due to Giff's defeat and joins forces with Chic to obtain Giff's cells and regain his immortality. He also puts the mutated Ryū Mukai out of his misery, but indirectly kills Nozomu Ōtani's parents. Azuma eventually entrusts the future of humanity to Ikki before dying and finding peace in the afterlife.

Azuma utilizes the Tri Chimera (トライキメラ, Torai Kimera) Vistamp in conjunction with the Chimera Driver to transform into the octopus/rhinoceros/centipede-themed Kamen Rider Daimon (仮面ライダーダイモン, Kamen Raidā Daimon).

Azuma is portrayed by Kane Kosugi (ケイン・コスギ, Kein Kosugi).

=== Kamen Rider Chimera ===
Kamen Rider Chimera (仮面ライダーキマイラ, Kamen Raidā Kimaira) is a king crab/crocodile-themed moniker used by those who utilize the Twin Chimera (ツインキメラ, Tsuin Kimera) Vistamp in conjunction with the Chimera Driver (キメラドライバー, Kimera Doraibā) belt and appears exclusively in the film Kamen Rider Revice the Movie: Battle Familia and the web special Birth of Chimera. The belt initially has the side effect of mutating its user into a demon until Chic incorporates one of Giff's eyes into it for Azuma's use

==== Ryū Mukai ====
Ryū Mukai (向井 リュウ, Mukai Ryū) is Nozomu Ōtani's friend and the first Chimera who appears exclusively in the web special Birth of Chimera. He turns into a demon due to the belt's side effects before he is destroyed by Kamen Rider Daimon.

Ryū Mukai is portrayed by Shohei Hashimoto (橋本 祥平, Hashimoto Shōhei).

==== Nozomu Ōtani ====
Nozomu Ōtani (大谷 希望, Ōtani Nozomu) is an aspiring doctor who seeks vengeance on Azuma for his parents' deaths and appears exclusively in the film Kamen Rider Revice the Movie: Battle Familia and the web special Birth of Chimera. He struggles to help Genta and Yukimi save their fellow passengers aboard a hijacked airliner. Though Nozomu manages to take the Chimera Driver and become the new Chimera, Azuma takes it back.

Nozomu Ōtani is portrayed by Issei Mamehara (豆原 一成, Mamehara Issei).

=== Yume Takeda ===
Yume Takeda (竹田 由芽, Takeda Yume) is a pregnant woman who gets involved in an airliner hijacking incident and appears exclusively in the film Kamen Rider Revice the Movie: Battle Familia.

Yume Takeda is portrayed by Haruka Tateishi (立石 晴香, Tateishi Haruka).

=== Tony, Hakim, and Minami ===
Tony (トニー, Tonī), Hakim (ハキム, Hakimu), and Minami (ミナミ) are three of Azuma and Chic's minions who appear exclusively in the film Kamen Rider Revice the Movie: Battle Familia and the web special Birth of Chimera. Hakim and Minami offer themselves to create Gifftarians while Tony spawns the Mandrill Deadman.

Tony, Hakim, and Minami are portrayed by Yoshihiro Minami (南 誉士広, Minami Yoshihiro), Koji Nakamura (中村 浩二, Nakamura Kōji), and Meiku Harukawa (春川 芽生, Harukawa Meiku) respectively.

=== Kōsei and Kazumi Ōtani ===
Kōsei Ōtani (大谷 晃成, Ōtani Kōsei) and his ill wife Kazumi (和美) are Nozomu Ōtani's parents who appear exclusively in the web special Birth of Chimera. They sacrifice themselves to shield their son from the explosion of a mutated Mukai.

Kōsei and Kazumi Ōtani are portrayed by Seiji Takaiwa (高岩 成二, Takaiwa Seiji) and Satomi Hirose (広瀬 仁美, Hirose Satomi) respectively.

=== Masato Sotoumi ===
Masato Sotoumi (外海 雅人, Sotoumi Masato) is a doctor who appears exclusively in the web special Birth of Chimera. He is used by Chic before being killed and possessed by the demon.

Masato Sotoumi is portrayed by Teruaki Ogawa (小川 輝晃, Ogawa Teruaki).

=== Yuriko Kuroe ===
Yuriko Kuroe (黒江 ユリ子, Kuroe Yuriko) is a member of Black Satan and Electro-Wave Human Black Tackle (電波人間ブラックタックル, Denpa Ningen Burakku Takkuru) who claims to be Aguilera's older sister, Yuriko Natsuki (夏木 ユリ子, Natsuki Yuriko), to get close to her and appears exclusively in the web special Kamen Rider Jeanne & Kamen Rider Aguilera with Girls Remix. She is saved by Kamen Rider Aguilera.

Yuriko Kuroe is portrayed by Ayane (文音).

=== Ms. Titan ===
Ms. Titan (ミスタイタン, Misu Taitan), real name Mitsuko Fujimoto (藤本 光子, Fujimoto Mitsuko), is a member of Black Satan who seeks to revive the organization and appears exclusively in the web special Kamen Rider Jeanne & Kamen Rider Aguilera with Girls Remix. She evolves herself into her enhanced form before being defeated by Kamen Riders Jeanne, Aguilera, Sabela, Zero-Two, Tsukuyomi, and Poppy and arrested.

Ms. Titan is voiced by Rica Matsumoto, who also portrays Mitsuko Fujimoto and voices the Himiko Crisper.

=== Devil Hana ===
Devil Hana (悪魔花, Akuma Hana) is Aguilera's inner demon who resembles the latter in dark clothes and appears exclusively in the web special Kamen Rider Jeanne & Kamen Rider Aguilera with Girls Remix.

While possessing her host's body, Devil Hana utilizes the Queen Bee Vistamp in conjunction with the Week EnDriver to transform into Kamen Rider Dark Aguilera (仮面ライダーダークアギレラ, Kamen Raidā Dāku Agirera).

Devil Hana is portrayed by Yui Asakura, who also portrays Aguilera.

=== Yūichirō Wakabayashi ===
Yūichirō Wakabayashi (若林 優一郎, Wakabayashi Yūichirō) is Yūjirō Wakabayashi's older twin brother who appears exclusively in the stage show Kamen Rider Revice: Final Stage. Under the belief that his brother died because of Fenix, Yūichirō awakens his inner demon, Vade (ベイド, Beido), in the hopes of defeating the organization. After being defeated by Kamen Rider Revice Shin, he learns the truth of what happened and is taken into Blue Bird's custody.

Yūichirō utilizes the Crimson Vail Vistamp to merge with Vade and transform into Kamen Rider Blood Vade (仮面ライダーブラッドベイド, Kamen Raidā Buraddo Beido).

Yūichirō Wakabayashi and Vade are portrayed by Kazuya Tanabe, who also portrays Yūjirō Wakabayashi.

=== Koshiro Igarashi ===
Koshiro Igarashi (五十嵐 幸四郎, Igarashi Kōshirō) is the youngest child of the Igarashi family who appears exclusively in the crossover film Kamen Rider Geats × Revice: Movie Battle Royale.

Kōshirō Igarashi is portrayed by Kiku (掬).

==== Koshiro's demon ====
Koshiro's unnamed demon appears exclusively in the crossover film Kamen Rider Geats × Revice: Movie Battle Royale.

Koshiro's demon is voiced by Masanori Hasegawa (長谷川 雅紀, Hasegawa Masanori).

=== Baridero and Izangi ===
Baridero (バリデロ) and Izangi (イザンギ) are aliens whose civilization Giff destroyed years prior and appear exclusively in the crossover film Kamen Rider Geats × Revice: Movie Battle Royale. Following Giff's death, the pair use a dimensional rift created during the event to travel to Earth and join forces with Korath to kidnap Kōshirō Igarashi's inner demon before they are killed by Kamen Rider Ultimate Revice.

Baridero and Izangi are voiced by Ryō Horikawa (堀川 りょう, Horikawa Ryō) and Hiroshi Kamiya (神谷 浩史, Kamiya Hiroshi) respectively. Additionally, the former portrays a fictionalized version of himself and voices Kamen Rider Juuga's system.

=== Kagetaka Ichimura ===
Kagetaka Ichimura (市村 景孝, Ichimura Kagetaka) is a scientist and authority on genetic engineering, the creator of Human Mutants (ヒューマンミュータント, Hyūman Myūtanto), genetically modified human clones that can transform into monstrous Transamsas (トランザムザ, Toranzamuza), and the true leader of the terrorist organization Alicorn (アリコーン, Arikōn) who converted himself into a Human Mutant and appears exclusively in the V-Cinema Revice Forward: Kamen Rider Live & Evil & Demons. He absorbs Rumi and transforms into a Transamsa Level 4. However, he is destroyed by Kamen Riders Live Marvelous, Evil Marvelous, and Imperial Demons, freeing Rumi.

Kagetaka Ichimura is portrayed by Ryosuke Takahashi (高橋 良輔, Takahashi Ryōsuke).

=== Rumi ===
Rumi (留美) is a girl with a unique condition who has been used by Kagetaka Ichimura since childhood and appears exclusively in the V-Cinema Revice Forward: Kamen Rider Live & Evil & Demons.

Rumi is portrayed by Rin Serizawa (芹沢 凜, Serizawa Rin).

=== Shunichirō Somei ===
Shunichirō Somei (染井 俊一郎, Somei Shun'ichirō) is a Human Mutant and a figurehead leader of Alicorn who can transform into a Transamsa Level 3 and appears exclusively in the V-Cinema Revice Forward: Kamen Rider Live & Evil & Demons. He is destroyed by Kamen Riders Live Marvelous and Evil Marvelous.

Shunichirō Somei is portrayed by Yu Imari (伊万里 有, Imari Yū).

=== Yukio and Mariko ===
Yukio (ユキオ) and Mariko (マリコ) are Human Mutants and members of Alicorn who can both transform into Transamsas Level 1 and appear exclusively in the V-Cinema Revice Forward: Kamen Rider Live & Evil & Demons. They are killed by Shunichirō Somei.

Yukio and Mariko are portrayed by Hayate Kajiwara (梶原 颯, Kajiwara Hayate) and Rima Matsuda (松田 リマ, Matsuda Rima) respectively.

=== Muramasa ===
Muramasa (ムラマサ) is a Human Mutant created from the DNA of Hiromi Kadota who can transform into a Transamsa Level 2 and appears exclusively in the V-Cinema Revice Forward: Kamen Rider Live & Evil & Demons. He is destroyed by Kamen Rider Imperial Demons.

Muramasa is portrayed by Junya Komatsu, who also portrays Hiromi Kadota.

=== Shō Takada ===
Shō Takada (高田 唱, Takada Shō) is a researcher and Masumi Karizaki's old acquaintance who absorbs Giff's surviving eye to evolve himself into a Homo Gifftex (ホモ・ギフテクス, Homo Gifutekusu) and appears exclusively in the web special Kamen Rider Juuga vs. Kamen Rider Orteca. He is defeated by Kamen Rider Juuga and taken into Blue Bird's custody.

Shō Takada is portrayed by Yasuhiko Imai (今井 靖彦, Imai Yasuhiko). As a youth, Takada is portrayed by Kazuya Okada (岡田 和也, Okada Kazuya).

=== Isao Saikawa and Michiru Haruyama ===
Isao Saikawa (斉川 勇生, Saikawa Isao) and Michiru Haruyama (春山 ミチル, Haruyama Michiru) are Shō Takada's assistants who appear exclusively in the web special Kamen Rider Juuga vs. Kamen Rider Orteca. They are taken into Blue Bird's custody alongside Shō Takada.

Isao Saikawa and Michiru Haruyama are portrayed by Naoki Kunishima (國島 直希, Kunishima Naoki) and Chisato Akita (秋田 知里, Akita Chisato) respectively.
