= Kōsuke =

- Gender: Male

Origin
- Origin: Japanese
- Meaning: Different meanings depending on the kanji used

Kōsuke, Kosuke or Kousuke (written: 康介, 康裕, 康祐, 浩介, 浩輔, 浩祐, 公介, 公輔, 公祐, 公亮, 幸介, 幸佑, 孝介, 孝亮, 孝輔, 孝助, 康介, 宏介, 紘介, 広祐, 光祐, 光佑, 光将, 耕助, 耕輔, 耕佑, 興輔, 昂輔, 晃佑, 亘右, 航輔,耕輔, 功佑 or こうすけ in hiragana) is a masculine Japanese given name. Notable people with the name include:

- Kousuke Akiyoshi (秋吉 耕佑; born 1975), Japanese motorcycle racer
- Aoiyama Kōsuke (碧山 亘右; born 1986), Bulgarian sumo wrestler
- Kousuke Atari (中 孝介; born 1980), Japanese singer
- Kosuke Endo (遠藤 幸佑; born 1980), Japanese rugby union player
- Kōsuke Fujishima (藤島 康介; born 1964), Japanese manga artist
- Kosuke Fukudome (福留 孝介; born 1977), Japanese baseball player
- Gomi Kosuke (五味 康祐; 1921–1980), pen-name of Gomi Yasusuke, Japanese writer
- Kosuke Hagino (萩野 公介; born 1994), Japanese swimmer
- Kosuke Hori (保利 耕輔; 1934–2023), Japanese politician
- Ijichi Kōsuke (伊地知 幸介; 1854–1917), Japanese general
- Kosuke Inose (猪瀬 康介; born 2000), Japanese footballer
- Kosuke Ito (politician) (伊藤 公介; born 1941), Japanese politician
- Kosuke Kato (加藤 康介; born 1978), Japanese baseball player
- Kosuke Kikuchi (菊地 光将; born 1985), Japanese footballer
- Kosuke Kimura (木村 光佑; born 1984), Japanese footballer
- Kosuke Kinoshita (木下 康介; born 1994), Japanese footballer
- Kosuke Kitajima (北島 康介; born 1982), Japanese swimmer
- Kosuke Kitani (木谷 公亮; born 1978), Japanese footballer
- Kosuke Koyama (小山 晃佑; 1929–2009), Japanese theologian
- Kōsuke Kujirai (鯨井 康介; born 1987), Japanese actor and singer
- Kōsuke Masuda (増田 こうすけ; born 1976), Japanese manga artist
- Kosuke Matsuura (松浦 孝亮; born 1979), Japanese racing driver
- Kosuke Morozumi (両角 公佑; born 1988), Japanese curler
- Kosuke Nakamachi (中町 公祐; born 1985), Japanese footballer
- Kosuke Nakamura (中村 航輔; born 1995), Japanese footballer
- Kōsuke Noda (野田 浩輔; born 1977), Japanese baseball player
- Kōsuke Okano (岡野 浩介; born 1969), Japanese voice actor
- Kosuke Onose (小野瀬 康介; born 1993), Japanese footballer
- Kosuke Ota (太田 宏介; born 1987), Japanese footballer
- Kosuke Ota (born 1982) (太田 康介; born 1982), Japanese footballer
- Kosuke Saito (斉藤 広祐; born 1983), Japanese DJ and composer
- Kosuke Saito (footballer) (齋藤 功佑; born 1997), Japanese footballer
- Kosuke Shirai (白井 康介; born 1994), Japanese footballer
- Kosuke Suda (須田 興輔; born 1980), Japanese footballer
- Kosuke Suzuki (鈴木 浩介; born 1981), Japanese footballer
- Kosuke Takahashi (高橋 浩祐; born 1968), Japanese journalist
- Kousuke Takahashi (高橋 孝助), Japanese historian
- Kosuke Taketomi (武富 孝介; born 1990), Japanese footballer
- Kosuke Takeuchi (竹内 公輔; born 1985), Japanese basketball player
- Kosuke Tamura (田村 康介; born 1976), Japanese shogi player
- Kōsuke Toriumi (鳥海 浩輔; born 1973), Japanese voice actor
- Kosuke Uchida (内田 昂輔; born 1987), Japanese footballer
- Kosuke Yamamoto (山本 康裕; born 1989), Japanese footballer
- Kousuke Yamashita (山下 康介; born 1974), Japanese composer
- Kosuke Yamazaki (山﨑 浩介; born 1995), Japanese footballer
- Kosuke Yatsuda (八田 康介; born 1982), Japanese footballer
- Kousuke Yonehara (米原 幸佑; born 1986), Japanese singer and actor
- Kosuke Yoshii (吉井 孝輔; born 1986), Japanese footballer

== Fictional characters ==
- Kosuke Kindaichi (金田一 耕助), a fictional Japanese detective created by Seishi Yokomizo
- Kosuke Shirai, a character from the manga series Urusei Yatsura
- Kosuke Kamiya, a character from the anime and game series Little Battlers Experience
