= Tagami =

Tagami may refer to:

== Places in Japan ==
- Tagami, Niigata, a town in Niigata prefecture
- Tagami Station, a train station in Gifu city
- Meitetsu Tagami Line, a former railway line in Gifu Prefecture; see Okayama Electric Tramway

== People ==
- Daichi Tagami (田上 大地, born 1993), Japanese footballer
- Kenichi Tagami (田上 健一, born 1987), Japanese baseball player
- Tagami Kikusha (田上 菊舎, 1753–1826), Japanese poet

== See also ==
- Tegami (disambiguation), a similar-sounding word
