= Kosuke Kato =

Japanese baseball player (born 1978)

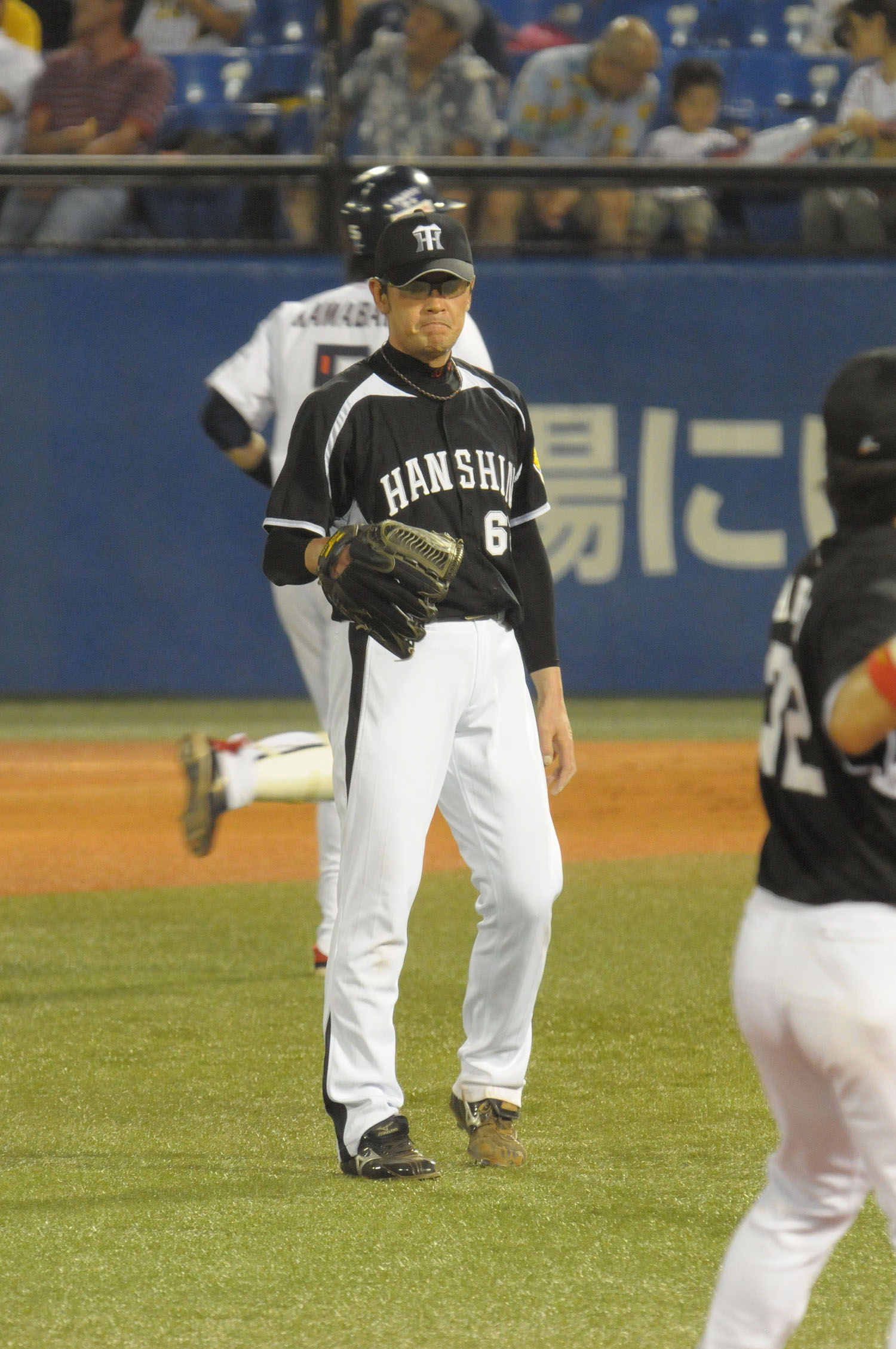
- Kato with the Hanshin Tigers in 2012

Fukushima Hopes – No. 63
- Pitcher
- Born: July 2, 1978 (age 48); Shimizu, Shizuoka, Japan
- Bats: Left Throws: Left

NPB debut
- March 28, 2001, for the Chiba Lotte Marines

NPB statistics (through 2015)
- Win–loss record: 29-43
- ERA: 4.42
- Strikeouts: 509

Teams
- Chiba Lotte Marines (2001–2007); Orix Buffaloes (2007–2008); Yokohama BayStars (2009–2010); Hanshin Tigers (2011–2015)

Kosuke Kato (加藤 康介, Katō Kōsuke; born July 2, 1978) is a former Japanese professional baseball pitcher. He was drafted 2nd in the 2000 Nippon Professional Baseball draft and spent 15 years in the league with the Chiba Lotte Marines, Orix Buffaloes, Yokohama BayStars and Hanshin Tigers. He has signed with the Fukushima Hopes of the Baseball Challenge League as a player/coach for the 2016 season.

== Early life ==
Kato started playing baseball at four years of age, and at the age of five became a left-handed pitcher. When at Shimizu Commercial High School, he was identified along with Takahiro Yamazaki as a leading pitcher within the Shizuoka Prefecture competition. However, at the summer tournament in his third (and final) year of high school, Kato faced Gotenba High School in the first round and gave up 15 hits and 12 runs in a resounding loss. Kato has cited this regrettable performance as his later motivation.

At Nihon University, Kato joined the first team squad from the spring of his second year. At the December intensive camp, he undertook a grueling training schedule of throwing 5000 pitches in his second year and 8000 pitches in his third year. In the first division of the Eastern University league he made a total of 42 appearances for an 8-win, 7-loss record, a 3.15 ERA and 80 strikeouts. Kato joined the Kagoshima camp for the Lotte Marines in preparation for the 2000 Sydney Olympics. He was drafted second by Lotte in the 2000 draft.

== Professional career ==
=== Lotte Marines ===
In 2001 Kato won 9 games as a starting pitcher, however the rookie of the year award was awarded to Masanobu Okubo of the Orix BlueWave. In the autumn of that year Kato was selected to represent Japan at the 34th IBAF World Cup. In 2002 his record was 11 wins and 15 losses, as he was expected to carry the club as a left-handed starter capable of throwing complete games. However, in 2003 he started suffering from atopy and was unable to perform. This problem has recurred in following years. On July 2, 2005 Kato threw a perfect game against the Yakult Swallows in the second-tier Eastern League, which was the third perfect game in league history, following Masayuki Yamazaki in 1962 and Hiroshi Masumoto in 1987. In 2005 had the lowest ERA in the farm league (1.78) and won a special award for his perfect game. During the 2006 season he was used as a relief pitcher, however shoulder pain saw him dropped from the first team roster and his season ended prematurely. At the start of the 2007 season Kato was listed on the first team roster, but was dropped on March 28 and traded to the Orix Buffaloes for cash on March 30.

=== Orix Buffaloes ===
Following the trade, Kato was first tested in the second-team squad. Towards the end of the season he was called up to the first team and pitched well despite not obtaining any wins. On December 19, 2008 Kato changed his registered playing name to his first name Kosuke, similar to some other Japanese players such as Ichiro Suzuki.

2008 was Kato's the first season since his professional debut in which he did not make any appearances in a first-league game. On November 5, 2008 he was given notice of his release by the Buffaloes. Wanting to continue his professional career, he participated in the 12-team joint tryouts. Following that he participated in the Yokohama BayStars' autumn camp, and was officially signed by the BayStars on November 28. He returned to being officially registered under his legal name.

=== Yokohama Baystars ===
In the middle of the 2009 season Kato was called up to the first team roster as a relief pitcher, and made a contribution to the team as a reliever, including recording his first win in more than three years on August 15 in a match against the Hiroshima Carp. In 2010, he was again mainly used as a reliever, but a poor season with an ERA of 7.81 in 49 appearances led to him being released for the second time in his career on October 1. He did not participate in the off-season joint tryouts, but was signed by the Hanshin Tigers on December 3 as they were searching for a reliever.

=== Hanshin Tigers ===
Kato was called up to Hanshin's first team in July 2011, but he struggled for consistency in 4 appearances and was returned to the second team just two weeks later. He finished the 2011 season with 31 second-team appearances and an ERA of 2.83.
In 2012 Kato made 41 relief appearances for the Tigers' first team, in part due to Ken Nishimura's unavailability due to injury. Kato mainly appeared to finish games that Hanshin was either losing or had a large lead, but he showed consistency with an ERA of 0.83.
He started the 2013 season on the first team roster, and was increasingly used in the set-up role from the start of the season due to the team's closer, Yasutomo Kubo being injured. On June 28 in a match against Hiroshima at Koshien Stadium, Kato recorded the first save in his 13-year professional career. Kato attributed his revitalization to concentrating on his pitching at a deeper level, something he learnt from his former Yokohama teammate Kimiyasu Kudoh, who had a 29-year professional career as a pitcher. On August 21, in a match against his previous club Yokohama, he recorded his first first-team win in more than four years.
In a match on August 31 against Hiroshima, Kato entered the game in the 8th inning as Hanshin's third pitcher and struck out three consecutive batters, protecting a 1-run lead and earning a hold point. Hanshin went on to win the game and Kato was selected for a post-match "hero interview" on the ground, his first such selection since joining Hanshin. Asked by the interviewer how the view from the podium was, Kato removed his trademark sunglasses and replied that it was "the greatest". He went on to say "This is my first time (on the podium since joining Hanshin). I feel like crying, but I am truly happy. Shintaro did his best and his 10th win was on the line, so I tried my hardest." Kato was referring to Shintaro Fujinami, who was standing alongside him on the interview podium and was the 5th person in the history of Japanese professional baseball to earn 10 wins in their first season after being drafted out of high school. Kato's emotions got the better of him and he then started crying. During the 2013 season Kato made a career high 61 appearances and had 16 holds, becoming an important part of the Tigers bullpen with Shinobu Fukuhara and Yuya Ando.
The 2014 season saw Kato again start in the first team squad but was dropped to the second team in July. He was recalled to the first team squad twice in August, but dropped again each time just four days later, with lower back pain causing his pitching to be inconsistent. He was left out of the 40-man squad selected for the Japan Series against the SoftBank Hawks Despite being active only in the first half of the season, Kato made 32 appearances and recorded 3 wins, his most since 2002, with an ERA of 4.56, which was close to his career average of 4.39.

In 2015 Kato injured his hip in the spring, with the pain reaching the point that he could not run. However, he recovered and was elevated to the first-team squad in July, but was only able to appear in 6 matches. At the end of the season he was released by the Tigers on 2 October 2015.

=== Baseball Challenge League ===
At 37 years of age, Kato was the oldest player to participate in the off-season tryouts conducted in November 2015. He faced three batters including his former teammate Kenichi Tagami and succeeded in getting all three out in only 8 pitches. However, he did not receive a contract offer from any NPB clubs. In December 2015 he signed as a player/pitching coach with the Fukushima Hopes of the Baseball Challenge League. At the announcement of his signing, he indicated his intention to remain active as a player with the hope of rejoining the NPB the following season or even sooner should any team face pitching staff shortages during the 2016 season.

== Playing style ==
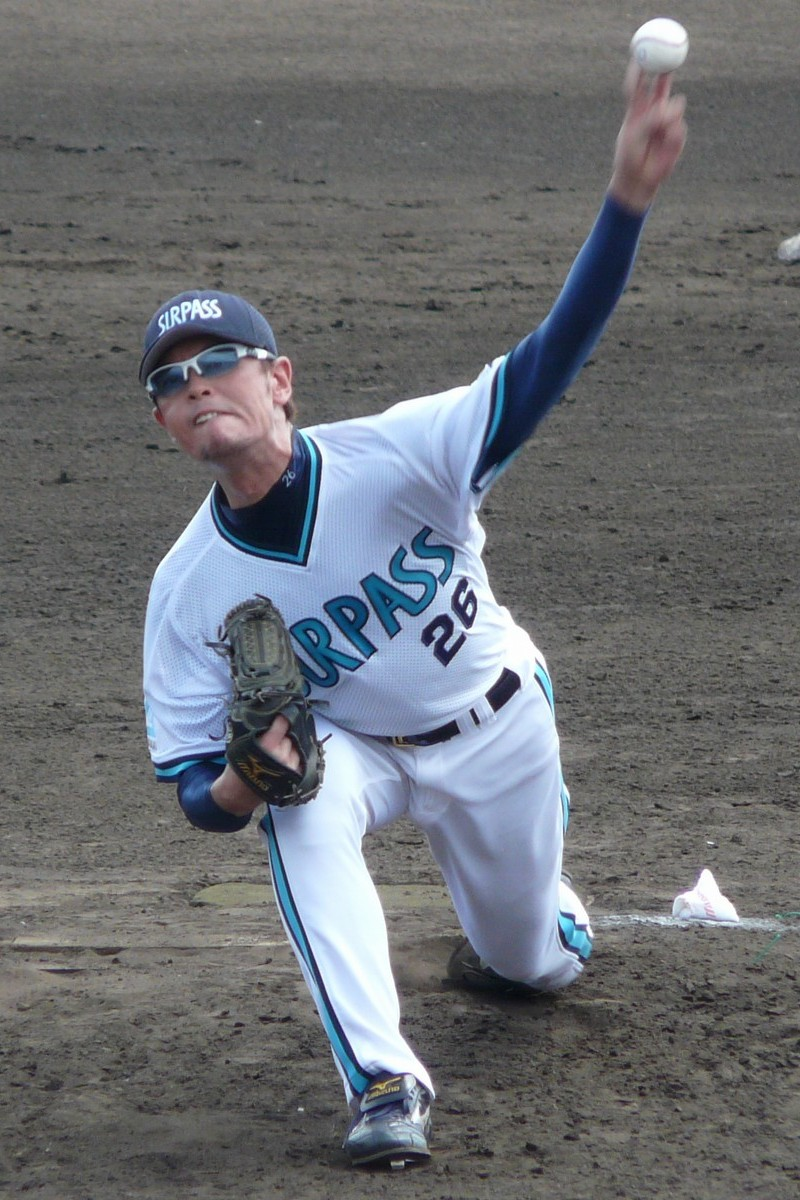
Kato pitching for the Orix Surpass, the former name of the Orix Buffaloes' second team

Kato uses an unorthodox pitching motion featuring a varied repertoire. His primary offerings include a fastball averaging approximately 140 km/h and a breaking curveball, supplemented by a slider and forkball. Since 2012, he has increased the usage of his slider and forkball relative to his curveball. The movement of his pitches contributes to his great strikeout ratio.

Kato recorded double-figure wins in 2002, but even in matches in which he was pitching well, he would suddenly lose his rhythm and allow successive walks and dead balls, so also recorded his career-high of 15 losses in the same year. He was expected to be a starting pitcher capable of pitching complete games. However, even from his third season, illness and injury caused concerns that saw him become a relief pitcher instead.

Whilst being a left-handed pitcher and also using chopsticks with his left hand, Kato writes with his right hand. He is well known for wearing sunglasses whilst pitching. It has been reported that since signing with Hanshin, he catches the train to practice and matches at Koshien Stadium.

== Records and awards ==
=== Records ===
- Professional debut: March 28, 2001 vs Nippon Ham Fighters at Chiba Marine Stadium
- First win: April 3, 2001 vs Kintetsu Buffaloes at Osaka Dome
- First complete game: April 15, 2001 vs Seibu Lions at Chiba Marine Stadium
- First shutout: August 2, 2002 vs Orix BlueWave at Kobe Green Stadium
- First hold: May 28, 2006 vs Yomiuri Giants at Tokyo Dome
- First save: June 28, 2013 vs Hiroshima Carp at Koshien Stadium
- 1-pitch loss: July 16, 2013 vs Yomiuri Giants at Koshien Stadium (26th occasion (25th person) in league history)

=== Uniform number ===
- 28 – 2001–2007 (midseason)
- 26 – 2007–2008
- 57 – 2009–2010
- 63 – 2011 -
