= Tegami =

Tegami is the Japanese word for "letter" (手紙), as well as the Italian pluralised form of the word for "frying pan". Tegami may refer to:

== Music ==
- "Tegami (Haikei Jūgo no Kimi e)" (手紙〜拝啓 十五の君へ〜, Letter: Greetings to a 15 Year Old), a 2008 song by Angela Aki
- "Tegami" (手紙), a 1995 song by The Boom
- "Tegami / One Summer Time" (手紙), a 2008 song by Bright
- "Tegami: Shin'ai Naru Kodomo-tachi" (手紙〜親愛なる子供たちへ〜, Letter: To All the Loved Children), a 2008 song by Ryoichi Higuchi; see 51st Japan Record Awards
- "Tegami" (手紙), a 2004 song by Hiromi Iwasaki
- "Tegami" (手紙), a 2001 song by Ketsumeishi
- "Tegami" (手紙), a 1994 song by Kome Kome Club
- "Tegami" (手紙), a 2008 song by Hanako Oku
- "Tegami" (手紙), a 1970 song by Saori Yuki

== Other ==
- Tegami Bachi (テガミバチ, Tegamibachi, lit. Letter Bee), a shōnen manga series by Hiroyuki Asada
- Tegami (手紙), a 2003 novel by Keigo Higashino
- Tegami (手紙), a 2006 Japanese movie starring Erika Sawajiri and Takayuki Yamada
- Toilet paper, in Chinese

== See also ==
- Tagami (disambiguation), a similar-sounding word
