= Lupinranger VS Patranger VS Kyuranger =

- Kanji: ルパンレンジャーVSパトレンジャーVSキュウレンジャー
- Revised Hepburn: Rupanrenjā Bui Esu Patorenjā Bui Esu Kyūrenjā
- Directed by: Hiroyuki Katō
- Written by: Naruhisa Arakawa
- Produced by: Motoi Sasaki (TV Asahi); Chihiro Inoue (TV Asahi); Ayumi Kanno (TV Asahi); Takaaki Utsunomiya (Toei); Takashi Mochizuki (Toei); Kōichi Yada (Toei Agency); Akihiro Fukada (Toei Agency)
- Starring: Asahi Itou; Shogo Hama; Haruka Kudō; Kousei Yuki; Ryo Yokoyama; Kazusa Okuyama; Seiya Motoki; Takumi Kizu; Yosuke Kishi; Taiki Yamazaki; Sakurako Okubo; Tetsuji Sakakibara; Shota Taguchi; Keisuke Minami; Naoki Kunishima
- Cinematography: Shingo Ōsawa
- Edited by: Kazuko Yanagisawa
- Music by: Hiroshi Takaki; Kousuke Yamashita
- Production companies: Toei Company; TV Asahi; Toei Video; Toei Agency; Bandai
- Distributed by: Toei Company
- Release dates: May 3, 2019; (theatrical release); August 21, 2019 (DVD and Blu-ray)
- Running time: 54 minutes
- Country: Japan
- Language: Japanese

Lupinranger VS Patranger VS Kyuranger (ルパンレンジャーVSパトレンジャーVSキュウレンジャー, Rupanrenjā Bui Esu Patorenjā Bui Esu Kyūrenjā) is a crossover V-Cinema release featuring the casts of Kaitou Sentai Lupinranger VS Keisatsu Sentai Patranger and Uchu Sentai Kyuranger. It was released in Japanese theaters on May 3, 2019, and on DVD and Blu-ray on August 21, 2019.

== Plot ==
The Lupinrangers are approached by alien pop star Hoshi Minato and his manager Jerataro, who demand money from them, when the Patrangers intervene. Suddenly, Lucky of the Kyurangers falls from the sky, allowing Minato and Jerataro to kidnap the Lupinrangers while the Patrangers arrest Lucky. After confirming that their captors are unable to help them in their quest to regain the Lupin Collection, the Lupinrangers break free. However, they overhear Minato and Jerataro saying they are stranded from their universe after they were dragged into a dimensional rift and agree to help them just as the BN Thieves Balance and Naga Ray appear, claiming they want Minato's guitar and join forces to ransom the Lupinrangers for the Patrangers's equipment, the guitar, and money. During the exchange, Gangler member Rirus Lipig appears and steals the guitar, forcing the Lupinrangers to use the Patrangers's gear to transform, but fail to prevent the enemy from escaping due to their unfamiliarity with them.

Meanwhile, Space Federation President Tsurugi Ohtori appears at the Patrangers' headquarters to help Lucky get released and reveal the Kyurangers's true objective is to stop Don Arkage, a Jark Matter remnant who escaped from their universe. Concurrently, Kyuranger members Stinger, Hammie, and Spada search for Lucky, but track Minato's guitar to a warehouse, where the Lupinrangers and BN thieves learn that Lipig is working with Don Arkage, who intends to use the Hyper Planedium in Minato's guitar to become invincible. The Lupinrangers and Kyurangers confront the two and defeat Lipig, but Don Arkage takes the guitar and absorbs its Hyper Planedium. Lucky fights back, but is severely injured by Don Arkage, who vows to return the next day to claim the Earth.

While Lucky is recovering, he reveals he attacked Don Arkage to prevent him from being fully bathed in the Hyper Planedium and create a weak spot. The next day, the Patrangers, Lupinrangers, and Kyurangers join forces to confront Don Arkage. During the battle, they are suddenly and briefly joined by Misao Mondo of the Zyuohgers. Together, the heroes defeat Don Arkage, but the enemy enlarges himself, leading to the Lupinrangers and Patrangers to form the mecha Good Cool Kaiser VSX and use the Kyurangers's powers to destroy him. After the battle, the Lupinrangers and Patrangers bid farewell to the Kyurangers who return to their own universe.

== Cast ==
Lupinranger VS Patranger cast

- Kairi Yano (夜野 魁利, Yano Kairi): Asahi Itou (伊藤 あさひ, Itō Asahi)
- Touma Yoimachi (宵町 透真, Yoimachi Tōma): Shogo Hama (濱 正悟, Hama Shōgo)
- Umika Hayami (早見 初美花, Hayami Umika): Haruka Kudō (工藤 遥, Kudō Haruka)
- Keiichiro Asaka (朝加 圭一郎, Asaka Keiichirō): Kousei Yuki (結木 滉星, Yūki Kōsei)
- Sakuya Hikawa (陽川 咲也, Hikawa Sakuya): Ryo Yokoyama (横山 涼, Yokoyama Ryō)
- Tsukasa Myoujin (明神 つかさ, Myōjin Tsukasa): Kazusa Okuyama (奥山 かずさ, Okuyama Kazusa)
- Noël Takao (高尾 ノエル, Takao Noeru): Seiya Motoki (元木 聖也, Motoki Seiya)
- Director Hilltop (ヒルトップ管理官, Hirutoppu-kanrikan): Ike Nwala (アイクぬわら, Aiku Nuwara)
- Kogure (コグレ): Yoichi Nukumizu (温水 洋一, Nukumizu Yōichi)

Kyuranger cast

- Lucky (ラッキー, Rakkī): Takumi Kizu (岐洲 匠, Kizu Takumi)
- Stinger (スティンガー, Sutingā): Yosuke Kishi (岸 洋佑, Kishi Yōsuke)
- Naga Ray (ナーガ・レイ, Nāga Rei): Taiki Yamazaki (山崎 大輝, Yamazaki Taiki)
- Hammie (ハミィ, Hamyi): Sakurako Okubo (大久保 桜子, Ōkubo Sakurako)
- Spada (スパーダ, Supāda): Tetsuji Sakakibara (榊原 徹士, Sakakibara Tetsuji)
- Kotaro Sakuma (佐久間 小太郎, Sakuma Kotarō): Shota Taguchi (田口 翔大, Taguchi Shōta)
- Tsurugi Ohtori (鳳 ツルギ, Ōtori Tsurugi): Keisuke Minami (南 圭介, Minami Keisuke)
- Hoshi Minato (ホシ★ミナト): Hiroya Matsumoto (松本 寛也, Matsumoto Hiroya)

Zyuohger cast

- Misao Mondo (門藤 操, Mondō Misao): Naoki Kunishima (國島 直希, Kunishima Naoki)

Movie-exclusive cast

- Announcer: Sakura Miyajima (宮島 咲良, Miyajima Sakura)

Voice cast

- Garu (ガル): Kazuya Nakai (中井 和哉, Nakai Kazuya)
- Balance (バランス, Baransu): Yūki Ono (小野 友樹, Ono Yūki)
- Champ (チャンプ, Chanpu): Akio Ōtsuka (大塚 明夫, Ōtsuka Akio)
- Raptor 283 (ラプター283, Raputā Ni Hachi San): M·A·O
- Shou Ronpo (ショウ・ロンポー, Shō Ronpō), Narration: Hiroshi Kamiya (神谷 浩史, Kamiya Hiroshi)
- Good Striker (グッドストライカー, Guddo Sutoraikā): Yūji Mitsuya (三ツ矢 雄二, Mitsuya Yūji)
- Jim Carter (ジム・カーター, Jimu Kātā): Rie Kugimiya (釘宮 理恵, Kugimiya Rie)
- Jerataro (ジェラタロウ, Jeratarō): Takahiro Sakurai (櫻井 孝宏, Sakurai Takahiro)
- Don Arkage (ドン・アルカゲ, Don Arukage): Atsuki Tani (谷 昌樹, Tani Atsuki)
- Rirus Lipig (リルス・リピッグ, Rirusu Ripiggu): Yoshiki Nakajima (中島 ヨシキ, Nakajima Yoshiki)
- VS Changer (VSチェンジャー, Bui Esu Chenjā): Rondo Mimura (三村 ロンド, Mimura Rondo)
- Kyuranger Equipment Voice: Subaru Kimura (木村 昴, Kimura Subaru)
- Zyuohger Equipment Voice: Chō (チョー)

== Theme song ==
- "Kyutama Dancing! Ver. VS" (キュータマダンシング! ver.VS, Kyūtama Danshingu! Bājon Bui Esu)
  - Lyrics: Shou Ronpo, Nozomi Inoue (井上 望, Inoue Nozomi)
  - Composition: Atsushi Hirasawa (平沢 敦士, Hirasawa Atsushi)
  - Arrangement: Satoshi Kawase (川瀬 智, Kawase Satoshi) (Project.R)
  - Artist: Project.R (Tsuyoshi Matsubara (松原 剛志, Matsubara Tsuyoshi), Tatsuhiko Yoshida (吉田 達彦, Yoshida Tatsuhiko), Hitomi Yoshida (吉田 仁美, Yoshida Hitomi))
