= Miyagi University of Education =

Higher education institution in Miyagi Prefecture, Japan

Coordinates: 38°15′32″N 140°49′51″E

- 宮城教育大学
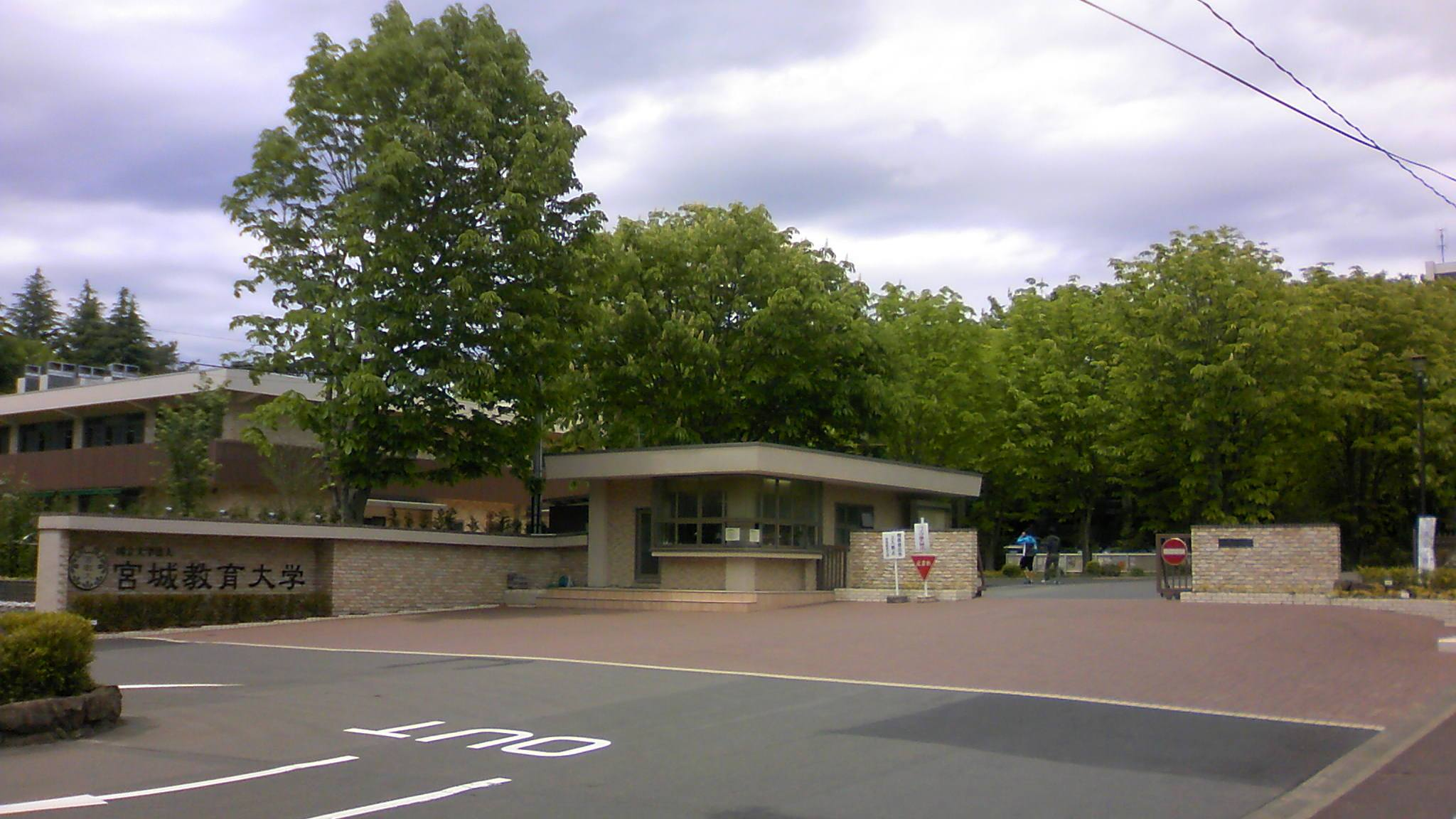
- Main Gate of Aoba Campus of Miyagi University of Education
- Type: Public
- Established: 1873
- President: Takahashi Kousuke
- Faculty: 121
- Administrative staff: 77
- Students: approximately 1,800
- Undergraduates: 1,600
- Postgraduates: 100
- Location: Sendai, Miyagi, Japan
- Website: www.miyakyo-u.ac.jp/en/

Miyagi University of Education, or MUE (宮城教育大学, Miyagi Kyōiku Daigaku), is a national university at Sendai, Miyagi, Japan. The predecessor of the school was founded in 1873, and it was chartered as a university in 1965. It is accredited by the Japanese Ministry of Education (MEXT) as a public co-educational institute and is ranked in Japan's first tier of leading schools.

With four academic divisions, MUE offers degrees in Education and in the disciplines of Language and Social Science, Science, Math and Life, and Art and Physical Education. Their Development and Education division covers Pre-School, Children and Culture, Pedagogy, and Educational Psychology. There are academic tracks for Elementary, Secondary, and Special Needs Education.

Many graduates become principals at schools throughout Japan.

== Notable alumni ==
- Hirohiko Araki, manga artist
- Kazusa Okuyama, actress
