= Kousuke Takahashi =

Japanese historian

Kousuke Takahashi (高橋 孝助, Takahashi Kōsuke) is the President of Miyagi University of Education. His specialty is Chinese Modern/Contemporary History.

== Biography ==
Takahashi was born in Akita Prefecture in 1943. In 1975, he received credits from working towards his PhD in Oriental History from Tokyo University Graduate School. In the same year he left Tokyo University to become assistant professor of Miyagi University of Education (MUE).

- 1988 – Became a professor at MUE
- 1996 – Became the Dean of MUE
- 1999 – Became the President of the Associate Elementary School
- 2003 – Became the Vice President of MUE
- 2006 – Became the President of MUE

== Publications ==
Latest Publication: "Social History of Famine and Relief"
