= Kazusa Okuyama =

Japanese actress and model (born 1994)

- 奥山 かずさ
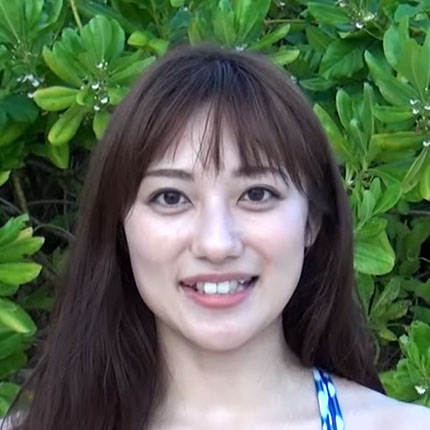
- Okuyama in 2019
- Born: 10 March 1994 (age 31); Misawa, Aomori, Japan
- Occupations: Actress and model
- Years active: 2014–present
- Agents: Oscar Promotion; MOC Planning
- Height: 165 cm (5 ft 5 in)
- Spouse: Mitsuki Takekuma (m. 2023)
- Children: 1

Kazusa Okuyama (奥山 かずさ, Okuyama Kazusa; born March 10, 1994 in Misawa, Aomori) is a Japanese actress and model who is affiliated with Oscar Promotion and MOC Planning. She is a Miyagi University of Education graduate.

== Filmography ==
=== Television ===
- Kaitou Sentai Lupinranger VS Keisatsu Sentai Patranger (TV Asahi, 2018), Tsukasa Myoujin/Patren 3gou
- Da rapper bites and becomes a rapper (TV Asahi, 2019), Rika Suzuki
- Kafka's Tokyo Despair Diary (MBS, 2019), Tsugumi Kuroyanagi
- Sedai Wars (MBS/TBS, 2020), Asami Tamagawa
- Police and Prosecutor (TV Asahi, 2020), Naoko Morioka
- TAT: Tokyo After Talk (WOWOW, 2020)
- K2: Dodgy Badge Brothers (TBS, 2020), Misora Ishidate
- Equation To Erase The Teacher (TV Asahi, 2020), Machiko Yasuda
- Kamen Rider Revice (TV Asashi, 2022), Yamagiri Chigusa (Episode 19-20)

=== Films ===
- Kaitou Sentai Lupinranger VS Keisatsu Sentai Patranger en Film (2018), Tsukasa Myoujin/Patren 3gou
- Lupinranger VS Patranger VS Kyuranger (2019), as Tsukasa Myoujin/Patren 3gou
- Kishiryu Sentai Ryusoulger VS Lupinranger VS Patranger the Movie (2020), as Tsukasa Myoujin/Patren 3gou

== Biography ==
- 2014: Weekly Young Jump "Galcon 2014" Second Prize Grand Prix
- 2015: Sportsland SUGO 2015 SUGO Race Queen
- 2016: Sportsland SUGO 2016 SUGO Race Queen
- 2017: Oscar Promotion "The Most Beautiful Twenties Contest" Semi Grand Prix
