= Sakurako Okubo =

Japanese actress (born 1998)

- 大久保 桜子
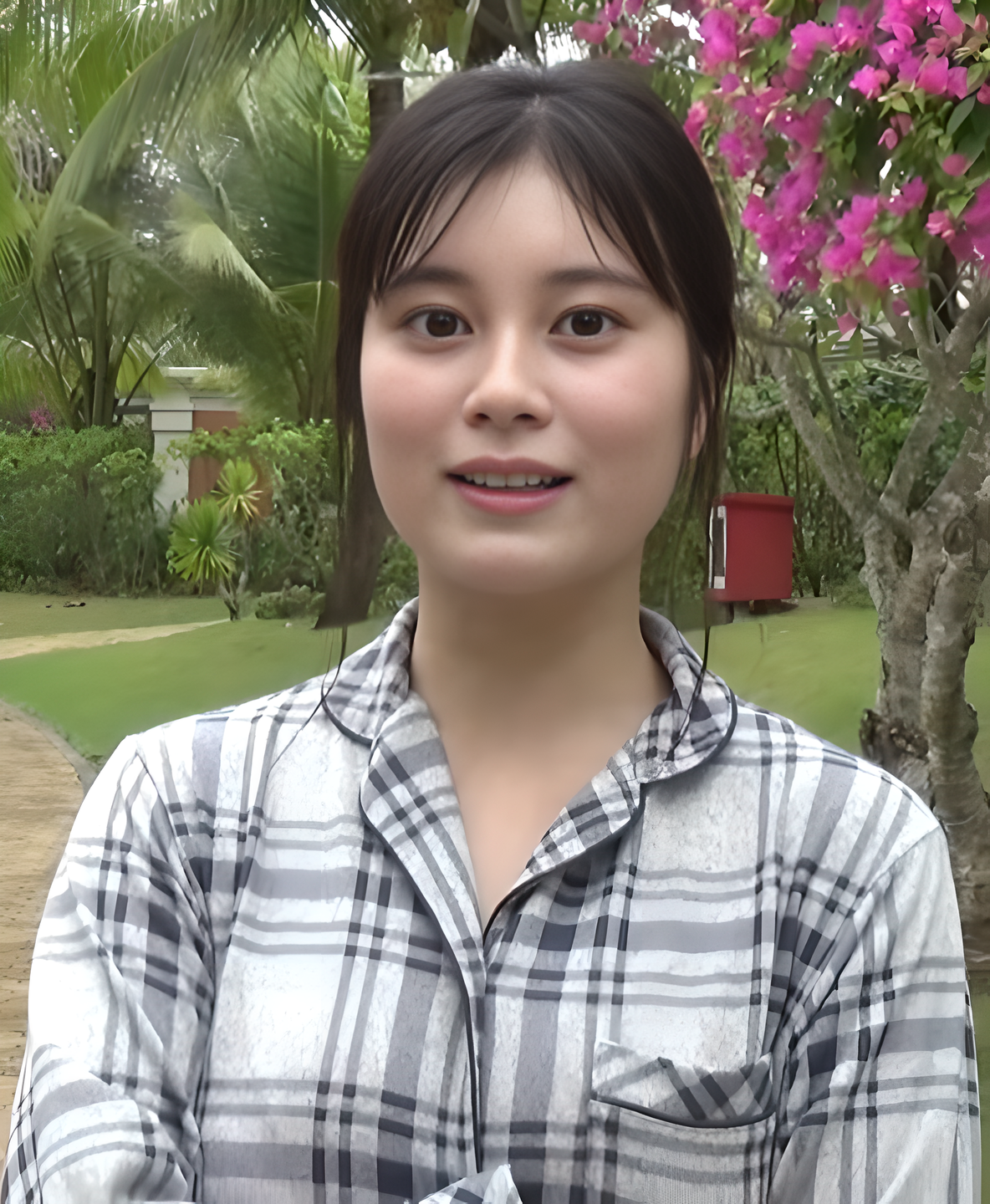
- Okubo in 2020
- Born: 20 July 1998 (age 27); Kanagawa Prefecture, Japan
- Occupations: Actress; Dancer
- Years active: 2016–present
- Agent: Oscar Promotion

Sakurako Okubo (大久保 桜子, Ōkubo Sakurako; born 20 July 1998) is a Japanese actress. She was born in Kanagawa Prefecture.

Starting in January 2017, Okubo was represented by Avex Group Holdings Artists Development Division., however, in December 2018 she switched to Wonderwave as her agency. On 31 December 2020, she announced that she was moving to HI RANK INDUSTRIES. In August 2023, she was moving again to Oscar Promotion.

== Biography ==
Okubo made her debut as the role of Hammie / Chameleon Green in Uchu Sentai Kyuranger.

In 2023, she appeared on the Japanese reality series Is She The Wolf? It was released domestically on Abema and internationally on Netflix.

Okubo speaks fluent English.

== Filmography ==
=== TV dramas ===
Year	Title	Role	Notes	Ref.
2017–18	Uchu Sentai Kyuranger	Hammie / Chameleon Green		

=== Films ===
Year	Title	Role	Notes	Ref.
2017	Doubutsu Sentai Zyuohger vs. Ninninger the Movie: Super Sentai's Message from the Future	Chameleon Green	Voice	
2018	Uchu Sentai Kyuranger vs. Space Squad	Hammie / Chameleon Green		
2019	Lupinranger VS Patranger VS Kyuranger	Hammie / Chameleon Green		
2019	BLACKFOX: Age of the Ninja			
2024	Honeko Akabane's Bodyguards	Azane Kurogumo		

=== Miniseries and special presentations ===
Year	Title	Role	Notes	Ref.
2022	Revice Legacy: Kamen Rider Vail	Yukimi Igarashi (Young)		
