= Kenichi Tagami =

Japanese baseball player (born 1987)

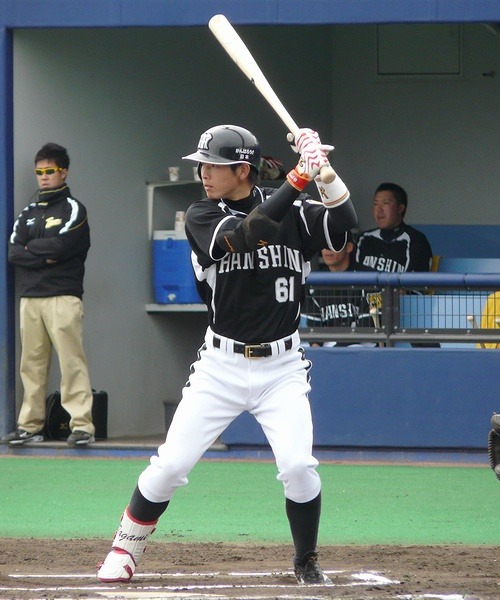
- Tagami with the Hanshin Tigers
- Outfielder
- Born: June 20, 1983 (age 42); Yokohama, Japan
- Bats: Right Throws: Right

NPB debut
- 2010, for the Hanshin Tigers

NPB statistics (through 2015)
- Batting average: .247
- Hits: 19
- RBI: 3
- Stats at Baseball Reference

Teams
- Hanshin Tigers (2010–2015)

Kenichi Tagami (田上 健一, Tagami Kenichi; born December 12, 1987) is a Japanese former professional baseball outfielder in Japan's Nippon Professional Baseball. He played for the Hanshin Tigers from 2010 to 2015.
