= No.1 Sentai Gozyuger =

Japanese television series

- Genre: Tokusatsu; Crossover fiction; Superhero fiction; Action; Dystopian fiction; Battle Royale
- Created by: Saburo Yatsude (original story); Shotaro Ishinomori (special thanks)
- Written by: Akiko Inoue (head); Tatsuto Higuchi; Keita Toume; Keiichi Hasegawa; Naruhisa Arakawa
- Directed by: Ryuta Tasaki; Kyohei Yamaguchi; Katsuya Watanabe; Hiroyuki Katō; Koichi Sakamoto; Kenshin Tanimoto; Shojiro Nakazawa
- Starring: Mio Fuyuno; Hideharu Suzuki; Masakazu Kanda; Jin Matsumoto; Maya Imamori; Kohaku Shida; Kaiki Kimura; Karuma; Daisuke Sambongi; Marupi; Noriko Nakagoshi
- Voices of: Yuki Kaji; Kenn; Yukana; Tomokazu Sugita; Reina Ueda; Mariya Ise
- Opening theme: "Winner! Gozyuger!" by Wienners
- Ending theme: "Biribiri Be-lie-ving" by Miyu Kaneko
- Composer: Kan Sawada
- Country of origin: Japan
- Original language: Japanese
- No. of episodes: 49 (list of episodes)

Production
- Producers: Takehiro Ókawa (TV Asahi); Keisuke Shibataka (TV Asahi); Daigo Matsuura (Toei); Kōichi Yada (Toei Advertising)
- Production location: Tokyo, Japan (Greater Tokyo Area)
- Running time: 24–25 minutes
- Production companies: TV Asahi; Toei Company; Toei Advertising

Original release
- Network: ANN (TV Asahi)
- Release: February 16, 2025 – February 8, 2026

Related
- Bakuage Sentai Boonboomger

No.1 Sentai Gozyuger (ナンバーワン戦隊ゴジュウジャー, Nanbā Wan Sentai Gojūjā; Number One Squadron Gozyuger) is a Japanese Tokusatsu drama, the 49th and recent installment in Toei Company's Super Sentai series. It is the sixth produced in the Reiwa era, and a commemoration of the 50th anniversary of the franchise. This is the only series to combine the motifs of modern, prehistoric, and mythical creatures. It is also the third special anniversary series, following Kaizoku Sentai Gokaiger and Kikai Sentai Zenkaiger.

The series premiered on February 16, 2025 to February 8, 2026, along Kamen Rider Gavv and later, Kamen Rider ZEZTZ in the Super Hero Time lineup on TV Asahi following Bakuage Sentai Boonboomger's finale. Upon concluding, a new Toei tokusatsu franchise called Project R.E.D. and its premiere entry Super Space Sheriff Gavan Infinity will replace Gozyuger in the Super Hero Time block, bringing the Super Sentai franchise to a hiatus.

== Plot ==
The "Universe War" was a large-scale conflict involving 49 Super Sentai and their mecha against a threat known as Cladis. At the brink of defeat, the Sentai offered their powers, creating the "Sentai Rings" to summon the ultimate savior Tega Sword, who destroyed Cladis but also provoked the destruction and recreation of the universe with the rings scattered across the cosmos.

Sometime later, five outcasts from society are given the chance to change their lives when Tega Sword chooses them to transform into the 50th Super Sentai, the Gozyugers, who are tasked with gathering the Sentai Rings (the one who assembles all of them will be granted a wish), which starts a competition not only between the group, but against the No One World Bridan, an elusive organization also searching for the rings and the "Universe Warriors", individuals who come into possession of Sentai Rings that give them the power of past Sentai, also competing to fulfill their own wishes. Things immediately heat up more upon the return of Mashiro Kumade, the first Gozyu Wolf and veteran of the Universe War, who now fights using his own set of allies as Gozyu Polar in the hopes of replacing Tega Sword as a god. In the second half of the series, the remnants of Cladis resurface and resume their plan to defeat Tega Sword while also targeting the Gozyugers and the Bridan.

== Production ==
The No.1 Sentai Gozyuger trademark was registered by Toei Company on October 24, 2024, and published on November 1, 2024.

Gozyuger was officially announced on December 25, 2024. A production announcement conference introducing the main cast and characters and the artists for the show's opening and ending theme songs was held on January 24, 2025 and streamed on Toei Tokusatsu Fan Club and YouTube on January 26, 2025.

According to producer Daigo Matsuura, while Gozyuger does include past Sentai heroes as part of anniversary celebration series, they instead are portrayed as Universe Warriors; fellow rivals to the titular team with different characters behind the suit. This was also done to introduce preceding heroes to children and newcomers alike without the need of bringing back past actors, as Matsuura draws comparison to the Ultra Monster Gomora from Ultraman being popular amongst today's children for its recurring appearances in modern day installments of Ultraman series despite being portrayed by different suit actors.

=== Dropping of Maya Imamori ===
On November 8, 2025, Toei Company announced that they dropped series actress Maya Imamori from the series after an alleged underage drinking incident. Her contract with her talent agency was also terminated, effective immediately. At the time of the controversy, Imamori was 19, while Japan's minimum drinking age is 20. In response, Imamori posted an apology to her Instagram page.

Prior to her dismissal, Imamori had been the subject of several unverified rumors, most of which originated from the Japanese tabloid Bunshun, which has led to accusations that Imamori was being targeted by the tabloid. Starting from episode 37, all references to Imamori and her character were edited out from the series, which led to fans accusing Toei of "erasing" Imamori. On November 15, Kohaku Shida was reported to be portraying Sumino, replacing Imamori.

The episode that was originally intended to air after episode 37, "The Final Request!? A Shining Aura of High Class" (最後の依頼！？輝くオーラはハイクラス, Saigo no Irai!? Kagayaku Ōra wa Hai Kurasu), which featured Sumino as the central character, was pulled from the airing schedule and had its footage repurposed for episodes 38 and 39. However, the preview for the cancelled episode 38 accidentally aired with a re-run of Bakuage Sentai Boonboomger episode 8 on TV Asahi's satellite channel Tele Asa Channel 1 on November 10, 2025 and was posted online by fans before Toei took it down.

According to location filming videos recorded by a fan posted on February 1, 2026, it was revealed that Imamori had originally filmed up until the crossover film, No.1 Sentai Gozyuger vs. Boonboomger, and at least up to episode 47 of the series. Filming was stated to have occurred in late October to early November, right before the announcement of Imamori's termination.

== Episodes ==
No.	Title	Directed by	Written by	Original release date
1	"Savior No.1!"; Transliteration: "Kyūseishu Nanbā Wan!" (Japanese: 救世主ナンバーワン！)	Ryuta Tasaki	Akiko Inoue	February 16, 2025
Hoeru Tono is a young man with no friends or family who gets caught in an attack from Bridan, invaders from outer dimension. In the occasion, he comes across a ring that allows him to transform into Gozyu Wolf, and is tasked to gather all Sentai Rings in order to fulfill his wish of "Becoming the number one".
2	"Catch the Treasure! It's My Prey"; Transliteration: "Bundore Otakara! Ore no Emono da" (Japanese: ブン捕れお宝！俺の獲物だ)	Ryuta Tasaki	Akiko Inoue	February 23, 2025
Hoeru is attacked by Natsume Tsutsumi, an acquaintance of his who possesses one of the Sentai Rings that allow him to transform into Kuwagata Ohger, watched from afar by Rikuo Byakuya and Ryugi Bakugami, two other ring bearers who can transform into Gozyu Leon and Gozyu Tyranno, respectively, but when Hoeru's landlord, Saori Iijima is absorbed by a No One Monster, Hoeru and the others are drawn into a treasure hunt in order to rescue her.
3	"The Boss of Japan! I'm the Prime Minister!"; Transliteration: "Nihon no Don! Watashi ga Sōri!" (Japanese: 日本のドン！私が総理！)	Kyohei Yamaguchi	Akiko Inoue	March 2, 2025
Hoeru discovers that the Prime Minister of Japan, Tokonatsu Atami, is also one of the ring bearers, who can transform into Don Momotaro. While thinking on how to defeat him, he is approached by a mysterious woman called Sumino Ichikawa.
4	"Party Time ☆ Dreaming Old Man"; Transliteration: "Pāryi Taimu ☆ Yumemiru Jijii" (Japanese: パーリィタイム☆夢見るじじい)	Kyohei Yamaguchi	Akiko Inoue	March 9, 2025
After making a pact with Tega Sword, 87-year-old Joji Takehara is given a second chance as a high school-aged "party person" under the name Kinjiro Takehara. Under his new identity, he begins to reconnect with his estranged family, in particular his grandson Futoshi, and gains the ability to transform into Gozyu Eagle.
5	"Recover Your Soul! Don't Let Your Troubles Get in the Way"; Transliteration: "Torimodose Sōru! Sumi ni Okenai Osekkai" (Japanese: 取り戻せ魂(ソウル)！スミにおけないお節介)	Katsuya Watanabe	Akiko Inoue	March 23, 2025
Sumino Ichikawa, the fifth Gozyuger, has made a pact with Tega Sword to find her missing younger sister Oto. However, she is unable to transform into Gozyu Unicorn until she discovers her true wish.
6	"The Final Battle! The Great Adventure of Tokonatsu Castle"; Transliteration: "Kessen! Tokonatsu-jō no Dai Bōken" (Japanese: 決戦！常夏城の大冒険)	Katsuya Watanabe	Akiko Inoue	March 30, 2025
After being ousted from his position as Prime Minister, Tokonatsu Atami teams up with the Bridan and challenges the Gozyugers to physical challenges at "Tokonatsu Castle". The challenge is disrupted by Fire Candle, who fights the remaining Gozyugers while Hoeru wins the challenge to reveal Atami's true wish: to have a best friend. Atami accepts Hoeru as his "Best Friend No.1", enraging Mr. Shining Knife & Ms. Sweet Cake into attacking the Gozyugers, but they are fended off by Daizyuzin.
7	"Get Excited! Come Together, Gozyugers!"; Transliteration: "Kokoro Tokimeke! Kesshū, Gojūjā!" (Japanese: 心ときめけ！結集、ゴジュウジャー！)	Hiroyuki Katō	Akiko Inoue	April 6, 2025
Hoeru, Kinjiro, and Ryugi are challenged by Meguru Osai, a Super Sentai archeologist, to refine their teamwork. Meanwhile, Sumino investigates a series of disappearances caused by a No One Monster, which gets her entangled in a No.1 Battle between the monster and Rikuo. After the monster is defeated, the Gozyugers are ambushed by an unknown assailant who shoots and kidnaps Osai.
8	"Between Right and Wrong, the Ring Hunter"; Transliteration: "Seija Yurameku, Yubiwa no Karyūdo" (Japanese: 正邪ゆらめく、指輪の狩人)	Hiroyuki Katō	Akiko Inoue	April 13, 2025
Hoeru is reunited with his brother Kuon, who, after many years trapped in the No One world, is now running a successful AI company. He soon reveals himself as Ring Hunter Garyudo, a mercenary hired by the Bridan's queen Tega June to steal Sentai Rings, urging Hoeru to unleash his pent-up anger and attack the Gozyugers. Hoeru's rampage makes him realize he has no wishes to grant, causing him to walk out on the Gozyugers.
9	"Unbreakable Wolf"; Transliteration: "Anbureikaburu Urufu" (Japanese: アンブレイカブル・ウルフ)	Ryuta Tasaki	Akiko Inoue	April 20, 2025
Fire Candle rethinks his obsession with fighting Gozyu Wolf, whom he does not know is Hoeru, eventually realizing he just enjoys fighting. At the behest of Tega Sword, Hoeru returns to the Gozyugers and realizes his true wish is to pay his debts.
10	"Go, Go, Go! Shōwa Has Arrived!"; Transliteration: "Ikeike Dondon! Shōwa ga Kita!" (Japanese: イケイケドンドン！昭和が来た！)	Ryuta Tasaki	Akiko Inoue	April 27, 2025
Meguru Osai returns, brainwashed into serving Tega June and piloting a black version of Daizyuzin. Meanwhile, Sumino and Kinjiro face off against a No One Monster who has reverted the city to the Shōwa era.
11	"Unleash the Wild! The Beastmaster Plays His Flute"; Transliteration: "Tokihanate Yasei! Yajū-tsukai ga Fue o Fuku" (Japanese: 解き放て野生！野獣遣いが笛を吹く)	Koichi Sakamoto	Tatsuto Higuchi	May 4, 2025
Rikuo is confronted by two new ring warriors, Vul Eagle and Zyuoh Eagle! In addition, the "wandering beastmaster" Gaia Todoroki arrives in Village of Tega Sword. His true identity is Gao Red, another ring warrior. Meanwhile, Onigokko No One appears in town, and Rikuo and Gaia decide to have a tag-team No.1 Battle. During the game of tag, Hoeru starts acting strangely.
12	"The Demon Roars!!"; Transliteration: "Jaki, Hoeru!!" (Japanese: 邪鬼、吼える！！)	Koichi Sakamoto	Tatsuto Higuchi	May 11, 2025
The "one-horned beast" that Gaia was looking for was a mysterious No One who came out of Onigokko No One. Gaia jumps on the No One, who is possessing his fiancé, Runa, like a beast, but is severely beaten in the process.As Gaia is being treated for his wounds, Rikuo realizes his "true wish" and begins to talk about his secret past. Rikuo decides to cooperate with Gaia, who is once again going up against the No One.
13	"Housekeeper Run! Ryugi's Manners"; Transliteration: "Kaseifu Gekisō! Ryūgi no Manā" (Japanese: 家政婦激走！竜儀の流儀(マナー))	Kenshin Tanimoto	Akiko Inoue	May 18, 2025
A new universe warrior have appear, which is the Red Racer. More shockingly, her identity is Ryugi's maid, who wants to take back Ryugi to his parents' house.
14	"The Sacred Servant and the Legend of Tega Sword!"; Transliteration: "Shinsei Jūsha to, Tega Sōdo Densetsu!" (Japanese: 神聖従者と、テガソード伝説！)	Kenshin Tanimoto	Akiko Inoue	May 25, 2025
Shoko turned into Boso Red Racer after too much worries about Ryugi. However, behind that, there are unforgettable childhood memories between them. In other side, Ryugi try to recall back how he encountered the legendary Tega Sword.
15	"Stop the June Bride"; Transliteration: "Sutoppu Za Jūn Buraido" (Japanese: ストップ・ザ・ジューンブライド)	Ryuta Tasaki	Akiko Inoue	June 1, 2025
It is June, and Bridan has started working on a plan. Mr. Shining Knife & Mrs. Sweet Cake go to Village of Tega Sword by order of Tega June. Fire Candle goes to a haunted house and bumps into the Gozyugers. Bouquet meets idol Rikuo in a flower garden. If Tega June marries Tega Sword, the world will end. What on earth is Bridan up to?
16	"True Savior No.1!"; Transliteration: "Shin Kyūseishu Nanbā Wan!" (Japanese: 真・救世主ナンバーワン！)	Ryuta Tasaki	Akiko Inoue	June 8, 2025
The world should have ended with Tega June's plan, but to everyone's surprise, Mashiro Kumade, also known as Gozyu Polar, has come down to save the world! Who is this "true savior" Mashiro? Meanwhile, the Gozyugers have somehow returned to their daily lives. However, Rikuo is a ronin, Sumino is an organic and ecological girl, Kinjiro is cared for as Joji, and Ryugi and Saori are wearing matching outfits...? Hoeru is surprised to see everyone looking like a different person, and soon meets Mashiro. What happened to everyone and the world!?
17	"Shine Brightly! No.1 Sports Day!"; Transliteration: "Kiratto Kagayake! Nanbā Wan Undōkai!" (Japanese: キラッと輝け！ ナンバーワン運動会！)	Katsuya Watanabe	Akiko Inoue	June 15, 2025
Undoukai No One shows up and suddenly the No.1 Sports Day begins! The Gozyugers decide to compete with the No.1 team in a ball toss, a three-legged race, and a cavalry battle. Aoi also gets involved in the No.1 Sports Day...!? Who will be the No.1 in the all-out Sports Day!? In the middle of all this, Mashiro's shocking past is also revealed...!?
18	"Mystery GP! The Detective Is in the Village"; Transliteration: "Misuteri Guran Puri! Tantei wa Sato ni Iru" (Japanese: ミステリGP(グランプリ)！探偵は里にいる)	Katsuya Watanabe	Akiko Inoue	June 22, 2025
In Tega Sword Village, an unexpected locked-room murder has occurred! Inside the store, a gold Ai was found stabbed to death by someone. Mystery No One appears, and Sumino, as a "high-class detective," decides to challenge him to a battle. However, while Sumino investigates the case, the number of victims increases, regardless of whether they are friends or foes of the Gozyugers and Bridan...!? Can Sumino really solve this difficult case!?
19	"White Burn With Two Hearts!"; Transliteration: "Futatsu no Kokoro de Howaito Bān!" (Japanese: ふたつの心でホワイトバーン！)	Katsuya Watanabe	Akiko Inoue	June 29, 2025
A mysterious woman, Mine Takanashi, suddenly appears in front of Hoeru! Invited by Mine, Hoeru plays badminton with her, eats her homemade lunch box, and is thrilled to be on his first date with her.... Meanwhile, Sumino, the "No.1 Meddler," and the others think that Mine is Hoeru's first love and secretly pursue them...? Just then, Universe Daizyuzin reappears, and Hoeru and Mashiro battle with their new powers of "superhuman god unity"!
20	"Serious About Gyaru! Oto Changed Her Character!?"; Transliteration: "Gyaru ni Shinken! Oto wa Kyara Hen!?" (Japanese: ギャルに真剣！緒乙はキャラ変!?)	Hiroyuki Katō	Akiko Inoue	July 6, 2025
The Gozyugers are in trouble when Gyaru No One suddenly appears and attacks them with an extremely dangerous attack. Then, Sumino's younger sister, Oto, whom Sumino has been looking for for a long time, appears. The grown-up Oto has "changed her character" into a Gyaru, and seems to be a different person from her pure childhood days. She also transformed into Shinken Red...? Soon after, the Gozyugers decide to have Oto give them some exciting Gyaru training in order to win the No.1 Battle against Gyaru No One!
21	"Burning Festival Spirit! Tega Sword Summer!"; Transliteration: "Moeru Omatsuri-damashii! Tega Sōdo Samā!" (Japanese: 燃えるお祭り魂！テガソードSUMMER(サマー)！)	Hiroyuki Katō	Akiko Inoue	July 13, 2025
Worried about Sumino, who is in trouble with Oto, Kinjiro makes plans to go to a summer festival with everyone as a distraction. However, the festival site has been taken over by Omatsuri No One! In order to get the festival back, Kinjiro and the others challenge Omatsuri No One to a No.1 Battle, but they are in big trouble... Then, the "Iyasaka Tega Sword Festival" by Ryugi begins! Then, Fire Candle, who has transformed into Shinken Red, intervenes. The Gozyugers and Bridan each engage in a fiery battle!
22	"Benefit? Annoyance? This Is How to Save Money!"; Transliteration: "Otoku? Meiwaku? Kore ga Setsuyaku!" (Japanese: おトク？迷惑？これが節約！)	Shojiro Nakazawa	Akiko Inoue	July 20, 2025
Hoeru, who is still trying hard to save money due to lack of money, battles with Setsuyaku No One! At the supermarket and in the bathroom, Hoeru demonstrates his special savings techniques that he has learned so far. However, Setsuyaku No One shows them his unbelievable saving techniques.... Meanwhile, Rei Gushima, the "man with the gray eyes," shows up at Rikuo's doorstep...!?
23	"The Lonely Star, Awakened Wolf!"; Transliteration: "Kodoku na Sutā, Kakusei Urufu!" (Japanese: 孤独な超新星(スター)、覚醒ウルフ！)	Shojiro Nakazawa	Akiko Inoue	July 27, 2025
The Gozyugers decide to lure out the runaway Fire Candle and seal the dangerous OrcaBooster. Mashiro seems to have a secret plan...!? Meanwhile, the out-of-control Fire Candle transforms.... And then Rikuo, who betrayed the Gozyugers, joins the fray! Who will be the true user of the OrcaBooster!?
24	"The Thief Causing a Stir at School"; Transliteration: "Gakuen o Sawagasu Kaitō sa" (Japanese: 学園を騒がす快盗さ)	Koichi Sakamoto	Tatsuto Higuchi	August 3, 2025
Sumino receives a request from a student at Keikai Academy to investigate, saying, "Something is wrong with my school." So the five Gozyugers split into two groups to investigate the school. Then, Hoeru, Rikuo, and Ryugi suddenly start enjoying their youth...!? Meanwhile, Sumino & Kinjiro meet Ikki Harewatari, aka Patren 1gou, the ring warrior who protects the school. Harewatari is desperate to catch Lupin Red, a thief who is causing havoc at the school. What is the true identity of Lupin Red, the truth about the inescapable school, and "true youth"? In the warped school, the anger of the youth-loving Kinjiro explodes!
25	"The Gutsy Police Are in the Clear!"; Transliteration: "Dokonjō Keisatsu, Harewataru!" (Japanese: ド根性警察、晴れ渡る！)	Koichi Sakamoto	Tatsuto Higuchi	August 10, 2025
Everyone finally gets to go outside after defeating Seishun No One, but this time, Dokonjo No One turns Keikai Academy into "Gutsiness Jail". The Gozyugers and everyone else are now challenged with the painful ordeal of the gutsiness prison. Then, to their surprise, Kuon appears...!? Meanwhile, Ikki realizes that he had been helping the No One and that Shinya Bando, whom he had looked down on, was fighting alone to protect the school, and he is depressed and unable to move.... Hoeru shouted at Ikki, "What a loser, show me your guts!" Will true peace ever come to the school?
26	"Close to the Secret! Hoeru Tono Is a New Employee"; Transliteration: "Himitsu ni Mitchaku! Tōno Hoeru wa Shin'nyū Shain" (Japanese: 秘密に密着！遠野吠は新入社員)	Kenshin Tanimoto	Keita Toume	August 17, 2025
Hoeru, a part-time worker who has been missing for years, finally succeeds in finding a full-time job! And the place of employment is that of "Toei"! Hoeru, dressed in a crisp suit, is immediately given his first job by Kazu Sekimoto, a producer. To his surprise, it was a close interview of the Gozyugers! The studio was filled with the familiar faces of the Gozyugers, and even the Bridan came to the studio, causing a big commotion...!? Will Toei's new employee, Hoeru, be able to make a number one TV show!?
27	"Win the Battle! Get Rich Quick!"; Transliteration: "Batoru de Kachitore! Ikkakusenkin!" (Japanese: バトルで勝ち取れ！一攫千金！)	Katsuya Watanabe	Keiichi Hasegawa	August 24, 2025
Bouquet has amnesia! Mashiro happens to find the lost Bouquet and decides to stay with her, even though she is his enemy. Then Money No One appears and Mashiro challenges Money No One to a showdown! Meanwhile, Hoeru and the others receive a letter from Kuon inviting them to a tour of Kuon AI Konzern. Thinking that it might be a trap, they headed for Kuon AI Konzern, where they were shown around the company by a man named Setsuna. What did they see there!?
28	"Dancing With Love! This Is the・AI"; Transliteration: "Ai ni Odoru! Kore ga Watashi no Jiai" (Japanese: 愛に踊る！これが私のthe・AI(じあい))	Katsuya Watanabe	Keiichi Hasegawa	August 31, 2025
All the Gozyugers excluding Hoeru are trapped in a dream by Setsuna! In the dream, Rikuo and the other four seem to be happy, and there is no sign of them waking up. When Hoeru tries to save them, an unexpected person appears in front of him...!? Meanwhile, Bouquet, who cannot regain her memory, is manipulated by Setsuna and attacks Fire Candle! Fire Candle desperately calls out, "Remember your love!" But will Bouquet be able to regain her "heart of love"!?
29	"The Ultimate Hospitality! Ryugi Is Serious!"; Transliteration: "Kiwami no Motenashi! Ryūgi wa Maji!" (Japanese: 極みのもてなし！竜儀は本気(マジ)！)	Hiroyuki Katō	Akiko Inoue	September 7, 2025
Ryugi is worried about Tega Sword and is not in the right frame of mind.... Just then, Omotenashi No One appears in town! Hoeru and the others challenge him to a "Serious Battle of Hospitality" without Ryugi, but they soon find themselves in a tight spot.... Then Ryugi appears, having made a serious decision...!? Meanwhile, Rikuo and Mashiro are reunited with Rei, who had disappeared...
30	"Noble and Powerful! The New Tyranno Is a Prince"; Transliteration: "Kōki Kairiki! Arata na Tirano wa Ōji-sama" (Japanese: 高貴怪力！新たなティラノは王子様)	Hiroyuki Katō	Akiko Inoue	September 14, 2025
The second Gozyu Tyranno, who took Ryugi's missing ring in his hand, is Prince Assam, who came from the self-proclaimed "Tea Planet"! The Gozyugers find out and get caught up in all kinds of trouble caused by Assam...!? Meanwhile, Mochitsuki No One has started a hellish mochi-pounding competition! Hoeru tries his best to make the best rice cakes in the No.1 Battle, but Assam...!?
31	"I Am Tyranno! The Will to Save the World"; Transliteration: "Ore ga Tirano da! Yo o Sukū Ishi" (Japanese: 俺がティラノだ！世を救う意志)	Shojiro Nakazawa	Akiko Inoue	September 21, 2025
Hoeru suddenly falls ill and is admitted to the Bakugami Hospital run by Ryugi's father, Ryuto. At the hospital, the Gozyugers run into Ryugi who had disappeared, and Hoeru is happy to see him again. However, Ryugi has followed in his father's footsteps and has become a completely different person.... Meanwhile, Doctor No One appears at the Bakugami Hospital! Doctor No One is about to start a surgery, but the Gozyugers...!? Rei, who has the Gozyu Tyranno ring, also arrives...!?
32	"A Sudden Breakup!? A Big Fight Between Knife and Cake"; Transliteration: "Dengeki Hakyoku!? Naifu to Kēku no Ōgenka" (Japanese: 電撃破局！？ナイフとケークの大喧嘩)	Shojiro Nakazawa	Akiko Inoue	September 28, 2025
Mr. Shining Knife & Mrs. Sweet Cake, who are always in love with each other, have a fight and say they are breaking up! However, Knife & Cake, who are one and the same, can't leave each other even if they want to. Hoeru and the others get caught up in the slapstick commotion of Knife & Cake and find out the dramatic story of their marriage...! Meanwhile, Rikuo's relationship with Rei is discovered by the Gozyugers. Rikuo, who can no longer keep quiet, tells them about his past with Rei, and "The Calamity" awakens in the worst possible way...!?
33	"Choose Your World! The Ultimate Final Sword!"; Transliteration: "Sekai o Erabe! Kyūkyoku Saishū Ken!" (Japanese: 世界を選べ！究極最終剣！)	Koichi Sakamoto	Akiko Inoue	October 5, 2025
The Calamity, Bellum, and Rei have put the Gozyugers in a big pinch...! In response, the petrified "Final Sword" appears in front of Hoeru. As a test of the sword, Hoeru is asked by Tega Sword to choose one of two worlds: the world he lives in now, or the world without Tega Sword, where Hoeru is happy with his brother Hisamitsu, not his parents or "Kuon". Tega Sword tells Hoeru, "If you choose the world without me, the Calamity will disappear." What will Hoeru choose at the crossroads of fate...!?
34	"Scattered Battle Scars, Gray Glow"; Transliteration: "Sanzuru Senka, Haiiro no Kagayaki" (Japanese: 散ずる戦禍、灰色の輝き)	Koichi Sakamoto	Akiko Inoue	October 12, 2025
The Calamity has not only harmed Mr. Shining Knife & Mrs. Sweet Cake, but even Tega June, leaving the Bridan trembling with rage. The Bridan commanders then make a decision...! Meanwhile, Rikuo holds a "Thanks Party" to express his gratitude to everyone before the full-scale battle against the Calamity. He invites Hoeru and the others to his house, where he serves them a huge feast, and they all have a great time together. Eventually, Rikuo decides to go to Rei alone...!?
35	"Transform!! You Too Can Become Younger"; Transliteration: "Tenshin!! Kimi mo Wakagaere" (Japanese: 転身！！君も若返れ)	Katsuya Watanabe	Naruhisa Arakawa	October 19, 2025
One day, Kinjiro encounters a mysterious high school boy. His true identity is Genji Kaku, his childhood friend who has rejuvenated and become the ring warrior RyuRanger! Genji's competitive spirit toward Kinjiro burns as fiercely as ever, and before they can even celebrate their reunion, they agree to a three-match showdown for the ring. Watched over by judges like Hoeru, they clash fiercely in cooking, menko, and baseball. As the rejuvenated grandpas battle in earnest, the Bridan suddenly barges in, plunging the situation into utter chaos...!
36	"Get Ready, Rival! What Is Youth!?"; Transliteration: "Areru ze Raibaru! Wakasatte Nan da!?" (Japanese: 荒れるぜライバル！若さってなんだ！？)	Katsuya Watanabe	Naruhisa Arakawa	October 26, 2025
Ever since his unresolved showdown with Genji, Kinjiro had been constantly pondering the meaning of "youth." Then, Trump No One—who inherited the will of their fallen comrade—challenged Kinjiro and the Gozyugers to a hellish Trump No One Battle! And there, at the battle venue, was Genji himself...!? This card battle is a deadly game where defeat means losing everything. Soon, Kinjiro and Genji revert to their original old man forms mid-battle, plunging them into a major crisis! The once-valiant Genji quickly becomes despondent, muttering, "I can't do anything in this body..." Then, Kinjiro, now in Joji's form, makes an unexpected proposal to Trump No One!
37	"Friendship Cross! Lord Kumade Is a Fashionista"; Transliteration: "Yūjō Kurosu! Fasshonisuta wa Kumade-sama" (Japanese: 友情クロス！ファッショニスタは熊手様)	Hiroyuki Katō	Akiko Inoue	November 9, 2025
Bouquet grows increasingly anxious as the Gozyugers keep getting stronger, and asks Tega June to create a new Bridan. The newly born younger sister, Ribbon, wanders off alone somewhere in search of her beloved "lovely things"...!? Meanwhile, Mashiro has become like a different person after losing his cherished robe he always wears. Amidst this, the Gozyugers face off against Fashion No One in a No.1 Battle. They all show off their special outfits, but...!?
38	"Judgment: Ring Hunter"; Transliteration: "Jajjimento Ringu Hantā" (Japanese: ジャッジメント・リングハンター)	Kenshin Tanimoto	Akiko Inoue	November 16, 2025
Why did Kuon become a Ring Hunter? Before him appeared a man who knew the answer to that mystery: Koyo Iwao. To Kuon, Koyo was a benefactor who looked after him and Hoeru in the No One World when they were children. Koyo, now a Ring Warrior, and Kuon engage in a fierce battle for the ring...! The Gozyugers, who stumbled upon this battle between Kuon and Koyo, are suddenly attacked by Ribbon. Ribbon imprisons not only the Gozyugers and Koyo, but even Kuon himself in a mysterious prison! The Gozyugers and Kuon must now cooperate to escape...!?
39	"Burning Intensity! I'll Show You the Power of the Rings!"; Transliteration: "Moeru Mitchaku! Miseteyarunda Yubiwa no Pawā!" (Japanese: 燃える密着！見せてやるんだ指輪のパワー！)	Kenshin Tanimoto; Hiroyuki Katō	Kenshin Tanimoto; Akiko Inoue	November 23, 2025
Until now, the Gozyugers have encountered various Universe Warriors and fought over the Sentai Rings. Now, Kazu Sekimoto, the passionate Toei producer who once made a documentary series following the Gozyugers, is making a comeback! Producer Sekimoto will once again follow the Gozyugers closely, uncovering the secrets of the Sentai Rings!?
40	"Terrifying! Ribbon Laughs in the Haunted House"; Transliteration: "Kyōfu Bakudai! Obakeyashiki de Ribon wa Warau" (Japanese: 恐怖莫大！お化け屋敷でリボンは笑う)	Kyohei Yamaguchi	Akiko Inoue	November 30, 2025
Because of Obakeyashiki No One, Tega Sword Village has turned into a haunted house! The town is in an uproar with people forced to play ghosts and others terrified. When the Gozyugers storm the House of Terror to restore the town, they find Bouquet and Ribbon there too. Separated from Ribbon, Bouquet trembles in fear of the ghosts, but fatefully reunites with her beloved Rikuo. Their sudden closeness creates a heart-pounding situation...! Then, the Haunted House No.1 Battle begins. Rikuo, who brings smiles to everyone, rises to the challenge!
41	"The Final Key! Bouquet of Destruction and the Creation No One"; Transliteration: "Saigo no Kī! Hakai no Būke to Sōsei Nō Wan" (Japanese: 最後の鍵(キー)！破壊のブーケと創生ノーワン)	Kyohei Yamaguchi	Akiko Inoue	December 7, 2025
Her beloved idol, Rikuo, is the hateful Gozyu Leon who defeated her sister, Ribbon. Burning with rage and sadness, Bouquet decides to abandon her name of "compassion" and avenge Ribbon. Meanwhile, even though Rikuo knows that Bouquet is his enemy, he regrets having hurt her, a fan. Ryugi begins to tell Rikuo about the first time they met... Meanwhile, the "Final No One" appears before Hoeru and the others. Confused by this mysterious No One, completely different from the previous ones, Hoeru and the others challenge him to a No.1 Battle...!?
42	"Forever Live! A Bouquet for a Rikuonist"; Transliteration: "Eien Raibu! Rikuonisuto ni Hanataba o" (Japanese: 永遠LIVE！リクオニストに花束を)	Ryuta Tasaki	Akiko Inoue	December 14, 2025
Goode Burn, abducted by the awakened Tega June, is to be re-educated as the "Prince of Ruin, Tega Nagure"... To save Goode Burn, the Gozyugers also head to the No One World! While each battles the Bridan, Rikuo once again faces Bouquet, consumed by hatred. Though an idol and a fan, they are also enemies bound by a tragic fate that forces them to fight... Still, Rikuo tells Bouquet, "I want you to be happy." Soon, an even more outrageous situation unfolds, and Kuon begins to move...!?
43	"Decisive Battle With Kuon! A Present from an Angel"; Transliteration: "Kessen Kuon! Tenshi kara no Purezento" (Japanese: 決戦クオン！天使からの贈り物(プレゼント))	Ryuta Tasaki	Akiko Inoue	December 21, 2025
In the Christmas-themed Tega Sword Village, the Gozyugers seem to be having fun. But only Hoeru looks gloomy, thinking about Kuon, who absorbed Tega June. The brothers used to write wishes together happily at Christmas, but now they must fight as enemies. Hoeru and Kuon finally face off in their final showdown! Meanwhile, the other Gozyugers engage in fierce battles with the Bridan generals...! At that moment, Goode Burn recalls Tega June's sorrowful expression in the No One World and wonders if there's anything he can do...!?
44	"I Am Red! An Original Sentai Has Arrived!"; Transliteration: "Boku koso Reddo! Orijinaru Sentai, Kenzan!" (Japanese: 僕こそレッド！折リジナル戦隊、見参！)	Koichi Sakamoto	Naruhisa Arakawa	January 4, 2026
Amid the bustling New Year's crowds, a mysterious red warrior—Origa Red—appeared before Hoeru! This megaton-level fighter wielding origami was searching for Hoeru for some reason, and the two ended up battling...! Meanwhile, the other Gozyugers were summoned by the person holding the final Sentai Ring, the Kakuranger Ring. Meanwhile, the members of Bridan each begin walking new paths, but only Fire Candle is dissatisfied with this situation...!?
45	"All Rings Gathered! All the Reds Stand by Their Comrades"; Transliteration: "Sorou Yubiwa! Zenryoku Reddo wa Nakama no Tame ni" (Japanese: 揃う指輪！全カレッドは仲間のために)	Koichi Sakamoto	Naruhisa Arakawa	January 11, 2026
Hoeru and the others find themselves in a major crisis when the Calamity, Vidal, is revived, but they manage to escape the situation. Sasuke, who witnessed the battle up close, challenges the Gozyugers to a "No.1 Yokai Battle," staking the Kakuranger Ring as the prize! Facing Sasuke, who declares, "The one I deem most yokai-like wins," the Gozyuger members each give their all to fully embody a yokai. However, only Hoeru is distracted, preoccupied with Origa Red's words: "You're unfit to be Red, unfit to be leader." Sasuke's words prompt Hoeru to reflect on "the reason I've pushed myself this far"... despite being unfit.
46	"Endless Youth! This Is the True Path of a Party Person!"; Transliteration: "Hate Naki Seishun! Kore ga Shin no Paripi-michi!" (Japanese: 果てなき青春！これが真のパリピ道！)	Kyohei Yamaguchi	Akiko Inoue	January 18, 2026
Finally, all the rings have gathered among the Gozyugers, but only one person can have their wish granted. Therefore, the six decide to hold a Gozyuger Inner Ring Tournament, and the first battle is set between Kinjiro and Sumino! However, just before the fight, Kinjiro starts pondering his own wish: "What does it even mean to become a true party person!?" Mr. Shining Knife & Mrs. Sweet Cake try to resolve his dilemma, but...!? Meanwhile, Fire Candle, having obtained the power of Calamity, makes "a certain resolution" and begins to move...!
47	"Go Fight, Rikuo! When the Hundred Nights End"; Transliteration: "Gō Faito Rikuo! Hyaku no Yoru ga Akeru Toki" (Japanese: GO FIGHT 陸王！百の夜が明けるとき)	Kyohei Yamaguchi	Akiko Inoue	January 25, 2026
The second battle of the Gozyuger Inner Ring Tournament pits Rikuo against Ryugi! But with both fighters evenly matched, the contest ends in a stalemate... So Ryugi makes Rikuo a proposal. If Ryugi can become Rikuo's producer and fulfill his wish to "return to being the number one idol," he gets the ring. Immediately, idol producer Ryugi launches the "Over-the-Top Rikuo Byakuya Production Strategy," a collaboration with Tega Sword. However, Bouquet, the self-proclaimed top Rikuonist, can't stand idly by and watch this strategy unfold. She steps forward to declare her own production plans, sparking a rivalry with Ryugi...!
48	"Resolve to Reform the World! In the Winds of Calamity"; Transliteration: "Kakugo no Yonaoshi! Yakusai no Kaze no Naka de" (Japanese: 覚悟の世直し！厄災の風の中で)	Ryuta Tasaki	Akiko Inoue	February 1, 2026
Before the ring battle with Hoeru, Mashiro is told by Lex, the boss of the Abyssal Calamity Cladis, "Become a god!" Mashiro's wish to "become a god surpassing Tega Sword" is granted, but it leads to humanity's extinction... Naturally rejecting such a proposal, Mashiro confronts Hoeru and Lex, but is completely outmatched. Then, Fire Candle bursts in, plunging the Gozyugers into an absolute crisis... Amidst the heart-wrenching cry of Goode Burn, "Don't go, Kumade!", Mashiro's "world-saving act of resolve" begins...!
49	"We Are No.1 Sentai Gozyuger!"; Transliteration: "Ware-ra, Nanbā Wan Sentai Gojūjā!" (Japanese: 我ら、ナンバーワン戦隊ゴジュウジャー！)	Ryuta Tasaki	Akiko Inoue	February 8, 2026
In an unexpected turn of events, Hoeru becomes the top contender in the ring battle. Before him, Fire Candle reappears. His purpose, of course, was to settle their fated battle. Fighting fiercely like beasts, Hoeru recalled the days spent with the Gozyuger members. What did Rikuo, Ryugi, Kinjiro, Sumino, and Mashiro mean to him, someone who had always lived as an outcast? What did he truly desire beyond the fight? Having found the answer, Hoeru finally confesses his wish to Tega Sword!

== Films and specials ==
=== Theatrical ===
==== Tega Sword of Resurrection ====
No.1 Sentai Gozyuger: Tega Sword of Resurrection (ナンバーワン戦隊ゴジュウジャー 復活のテガソード, Nanbā Wan Sentai Gojūjā Fukkatsu no Tega Sōdo) is a film released in Japanese theaters on July 25, 2025, double-billed with Kamen Rider Gavv: Invaders of the House of Snacks and Gochizo's Summer Vacation. The events of the film take place between episodes 26 and 27 of the series.

=== V-Cinema ===
==== Gozyuger vs. Boonboomger ====
No.1 Sentai Gozyuger vs. Boonboomger (ナンバーワン戦隊ゴジュウジャーVSブンブンジャー, Nanbā Wan Sentai Gojūjā Tai Bunbunjā) is a V-Cinema release that features a crossover between Gozyuger and Bakuage Sentai Boonboomger. The V-Cinema received a limited theatrical release on March 20, 2026, followed by its DVD and Blu-ray release on July 29, 2026. The events of the V-Cinema take place between episodes 45 and 46 of the series. Masaki Nakao, Ryota Ozawa and Mitsuomi Takahashi also reprise their respective roles as Yamato Kazakiri/Zyuoh Eagle from Doubutsu Sentai Zyuohger, Captain Marvelous/Gokai Red from Kaizoku Sentai Gokaiger and Satoru Akashi/Bouken Red from GoGo Sentai Boukenger.

=== Special episodes ===
- Super Sentai Universe War: No.1 Sentai Gozyuger Episode 0 (スーパー戦隊・ユニバース大戦 〜ナンバーワン戦隊ゴジュウジャー Episode 0〜, Sūpā Sentai Yunibāsu Taisen Nanbā Wan Sentai Gojūjā Episōdo Zero): A web-exclusive prequel special released on YouTube on February 2, 2025. The short describes the Universe War and how Tega Sword and the Sentai Rings were created.
- No.1 Sentai Gozyuger: Anniversary Discussion (ナンバーワン戦隊ゴジュウジャー アニバーサリー討論会, Nanbā Wan Sentai Gojūjā Anibāsarī Tōronkai): A web-exclusive crossover special released on YouTube on February 9, 2025. Masahiro Inoue, Ryota Ozawa, Kiita Komagine, and Seiichiro Nagata reprised their respective voice roles as Kamen Rider Decade from Kamen Rider Decade, Gokai Red from Kaizoku Sentai Gokaiger, Zenkaizer from Kikai Sentai Zenkaiger, and Kamen Rider Legend from Kamen Rider Gotchard. The short is a comedic discussion about how Gozyuger was chosen to be an anniversary series to celebrate the 50 years of the Super Sentai despite being the 49th installment.
- Gozyuger Fill-in Plan: No.1 Confessional (ゴジュウジャー補ジュウ計画 ナンバーワン懺悔室, Gojūjā Hojū Keikau Nanbā Wan Zangeshitsu): A web-exclusive series released on Toei Tokusatsu Fan Club on March 16, 2025. Starting from episode 40 of the web-exclusive series, No.1 Confessional was changed to No.1 Meeting Room (ナンバーワン会議室, Nanbā Wan Kaigishitsu).
- No.1 Sentai Gozyuger: Polar Beginning (ナンバーワン戦隊ゴジュウジャー ポーラー・ビギニング, Nanbā Wan Sentai Gojūjā Pōrā Biginingu): A web-exclusive prequel special released on Toei Tokusatsu Fan Club on April 19, 2026. The events of the special take place 20 years before the series.

== Manga ==
No.1 Sentai Gozyuger: The Manga Universe (ナンバーワン戦隊ゴジュウジャー THE MANGA UNIVERSE, Nanbā Wan Sentai Gojūjā Za Manga Yunibāsu) is a web-exclusive manga scheduled to be released on Toei Tokusatsu Fan Club on September 20, 2026.

== Cast ==
- Hoeru Tono (遠野 吠, Tōno Hoeru): Mio Fuyuno (冬野 心央, Fuyuno Mio)
- Rikuo Byakuya (百夜 陸王, Byakuya Rikuo): Hideharu Suzuki (鈴木 秀脩, Suzuki Hideharu)
- Ryugi Bakugami (暴神 竜儀, Bakugami Ryūgi): Masakazu Kanda (神田 聖司, Kanda Masakazu)
- Kinjiro Takehara (猛原 禽次郎, Takehara Kinjirō): Jin Matsumoto (松本 仁, Matsumoto Jin)
  - Joji Takehara (猛原 譲二, Takehara Jōji): Masaki Kobayashi (小林 正樹, Kobayashi Masaki)
- Sumino Ichikawa (一河 角乃, Ichikawa Sumino): Maya Imamori (今森 茉耶, Imamori Maya; 1–36), Kohaku Shida (志田 こはく, Shida Kohaku; 40–49) (Note: Gozyu Unicorn is voiced by Ayaka Maekawa (前川 綾香, Maekawa Ayaka) in episodes 37–39.)
- Mashiro Kumade (熊手 真白, Kumade Mashiro): Kaiki Kimura (木村 魁希, Kimura Kaiki)
- Kuon (クオン), Garyu Decalibur 50 (ガリューデカリバー50(ゴー), Garyū Dekaribā Gō; Voice): Karuma (カルマ)
- Fire Candle (ファイヤキャンドル, Faiya Candoru): Daisuke Sambongi (三本木 大輔, Sanbongi Daisuke)
- Bouquet (ブーケ, Būke): Marupi (まるぴ)
- Aoi Iijima (飯島 碧, Iijima Aoi): Kōki Yuda (湯田 幸希, Yuda Kōki)
- Saori Iijima (飯島 佐織, Iijima Saori): Noriko Nakagoshi (中越 典子, Nakagoshi Noriko)

=== Voice cast ===
- Narrator, Tega Sword (テガソード, Tega Sōdo): Yuki Kaji (梶 裕貴, Kaji Yūki)
- Goode Burn (グーデバーン, Gūde Bān), Bearkuma 50 (ベアックマ50(ゴー), Beakuma Gō): Kenn
- Tega June (テガジューン, Tega Jūn): Yukana (ゆかな)
- Mr. Shining Knife (Mr.シャイニングナイフ, Misutā Shainingu Naifu): Tomokazu Sugita (杉田 智和, Sugita Tomokazu)
- Mrs. Sweet Cake (Mrs.スイートケーク, Misesu Suīto Kēku): Reina Ueda (上田 麗奈, Ueda Reina)
- Ribbon (リボン, Ribon): Mariya Ise (伊瀬 茉莉也, Ise Mariya)
- Battle Voice: Wataru Komada (駒田 航, Komada Wataru)

=== Guest cast ===
- Natsume Tsutsumi (堤 なつめ, Tsutsumi Natsume; 1–2): Haruhi Iuchi (井内 悠陽, Iuchi Haruhi)
- Tokonatsu Atami (熱海 常夏, Atami Tokonatsu; 3–6, 49): Kou Nanase (七瀬 公, Nanase Kō)
- Soma Tono (遠野 蒼真, Tōno Sōma; 4, 6, 33): (Note: Credited in episodes 4 and 6 as Hoeru's father.) Hiroyuki Matsumoto (松本 博之, Matsumoto Hiroyuki)
- Himself (5): Kumamon (くまモン)
- Gaia Todoroki (等々力 凱亜, Todoroki Gaia; 11–12, 49): Yūichi Nakamura (中村 優一, Nakamura Yūichi)
- Kawashima (川島; 11): Catcher Nakazawa (キャッチャー中澤, Kyatchā Nakazawa)
- Iwashita (岩下; 11), Shrine visitor (44): Ryuma Hashido (橋渡 竜馬, Hashido Ryūma)
- Shoko Yamori (家守 召子, Yamori Shōko; 13–14, 49): Rima Matsuda (松田 リマ, Matsuda Rima)
- Old man (13): Akira Sakamoto (坂本 あきら, Sakamoto Akira)
- Rei Gushima (具島 玲, Gushima Rei; 21-23, 28-34, 49): Ryōma Baba (馬場 良馬, Baba Ryōma) (Note: Rei Gushima and Ryōma Baba are credited in episode 21 as Gray-eyed man and ??? respectively.)
- Sho Torikai (鳥飼 翔, Torikai Shō; 22): Hirofumi Suzuki (鈴木 浩文, Suzuki Hirofumi)
- Ikki Harewatari (晴渡 一輝, Harewatari Ikki; 24–25): Raiga Terasaka (寺坂 頼我, Terasaka Raiga)
- Shinya Bando (晩堂 深也, Bandō Shin'ya; 24–25): Seiji Takaiwa (高岩 成二, Takaiwa Seiji)
- History teacher (24): Tadashi Mizuno (水野 直, Mizuno Tadashi)
- Kazu Sekimoto (関本 カズ, Sekimoto Kazu; 26, 39, 49), Hattesa Buro (ハッテサ・ブロウ, Hattesa Burō; Voice; 26): Tomokazu Seki (関 智一, Seki Tomokazu)
- Arata Setsuna (設名 新, Setsuna Arata; 27–28): Atomu Mizuishi (水石 亜飛夢, Mizuishi Atomu)
- Assam (アッサム, Assamu; 30, 34): Hiroki Sasamori (笹森 裕貴, Sasamori Hiroki)
- Shop owner (30): Jubun Fukuzawa (福澤 重文, Fukuzawa Jūbun)
- Ryuto Bakugami (暴神 竜登, Bakugami Ryūto; 31): Kenya Ōsumi (大澄 賢也, Ōsumi Ken'ya)
- Genji Kaku (Old) (嘉挧 源治 (老), Kaku Genji (Rō); 35–36): Shigeru Saiki (斉木 しげる, Saiki Shigeru)
- Koyo Iwao (巌 紅葉, Iwao Kōyō; 38): Ryosei Konishi (小西 遼生, Konishi Ryōsei)
- Sasuke (サスケ; 44–45): Teruaki Ogawa (小川 輝晃, Ogawa Teruaki) (Note: Sasuke and Teruaki Ogawa are credited in episode 44 as Ninja Red and ??? respectively.)
- Origa Red (オリガレッド, Origa Reddo; Voice; 44–45): Shimba Tsuchiya (土屋 神葉, Tsuchiya Shinba)
- People running away (Voice; 44): Satomi Hirose (広瀬 仁美, Hirose Satomi), Shu Kawai (河合 秀, Kawai Shū)

== Songs ==
Opening themes

- "Winner! Gozyuger!" (WINNER！ゴジュウジャー！, Winā! Gojūjā!)
  - Lyrics & Composition: Tamaya 2060% (玉屋2060％, Tamaya Nisen-rokujuppāsento)
  - Arrangement & Artist: Wienners
- "YOU BE ONE WINNER"
  - Lyrics: Mike Sugiyama (マイク スギヤマ, Maiku Sugiyama)
  - Composition: Kan Sawada (沢田 完, Sawada Kan)
  - Arrangement: Koichiro Kameyama (亀山 耕一郎, Kameyama Kōichirō)
  - Artist: Hiroshi Kitadani (きただに ひろし, Kitadani Hiroshi)
  - Episodes: 16

Ending theme

- "Biribiri Be-lie-ving" (ビリビリBe-lie-ving, Biribiri Birībingu)
  - Lyrics: Shoko Fujibayashi (藤林 聖子, Fujibayashi Shōko)
  - Composition & Arrangement: Mio Kimura
  - Artist: Miyu Kaneko (金子 みゆ, Kaneko Miyu)

== Broadcasts and streaming ==
- In its home country, Japan, it is currently airing on ANN's flagship station TV Asahi on Sunday Mornings at 9:30AM JST, starting February 16, 2025. It is also airing on other ANN-affiliated networks. It is also distributed on the Official Super Sentai YouTube channel, which premieres episodes at 10:00AM JST, a half-hour after its television airing.
- Thailand is the first country in the world to have an international airing of this series, outside of Japan. No.1 Sentai Gozyuger premiered on the Cartoon Club's YouTube channel on March 1, 2025, for members in Japanese with Thai subtitles and on March 8, 2025, for general viewership. On Saturdays at 9:00AM starting on March 15, 2025, they began posting a Thai dub of the series for membership and on March 22, 2025 is when they started doing general releases of the Thai dub outside of membership.
- Hong Kong began airing the series on May 15 on ViuTV, broadcasting a Cantonese dub on Sundays at 9:30AM being the first Sentai to air alongside the Japanese broadcast instead of a year after.
- Taiwan began airing the series on June 13th on YoYoTV, broadcasting a Mandarin dub on Fridays at 5:30PM with a rebroadcast airing the next day on Saturdays at 4:30PM. It would later be added to streaming sites on demand uncut starting from June 21 with an episode updating each Saturday. Starting from September 6, YoYoTV's youtube channel would upload the TV cuts of each episode every Saturday. Like Hong Kong, this would be the first Sentai to air alongside the Japanese broadcast.
