= Maya Imamori =

Japanese gravure model and actress (born 2006)

- 今森 茉耶
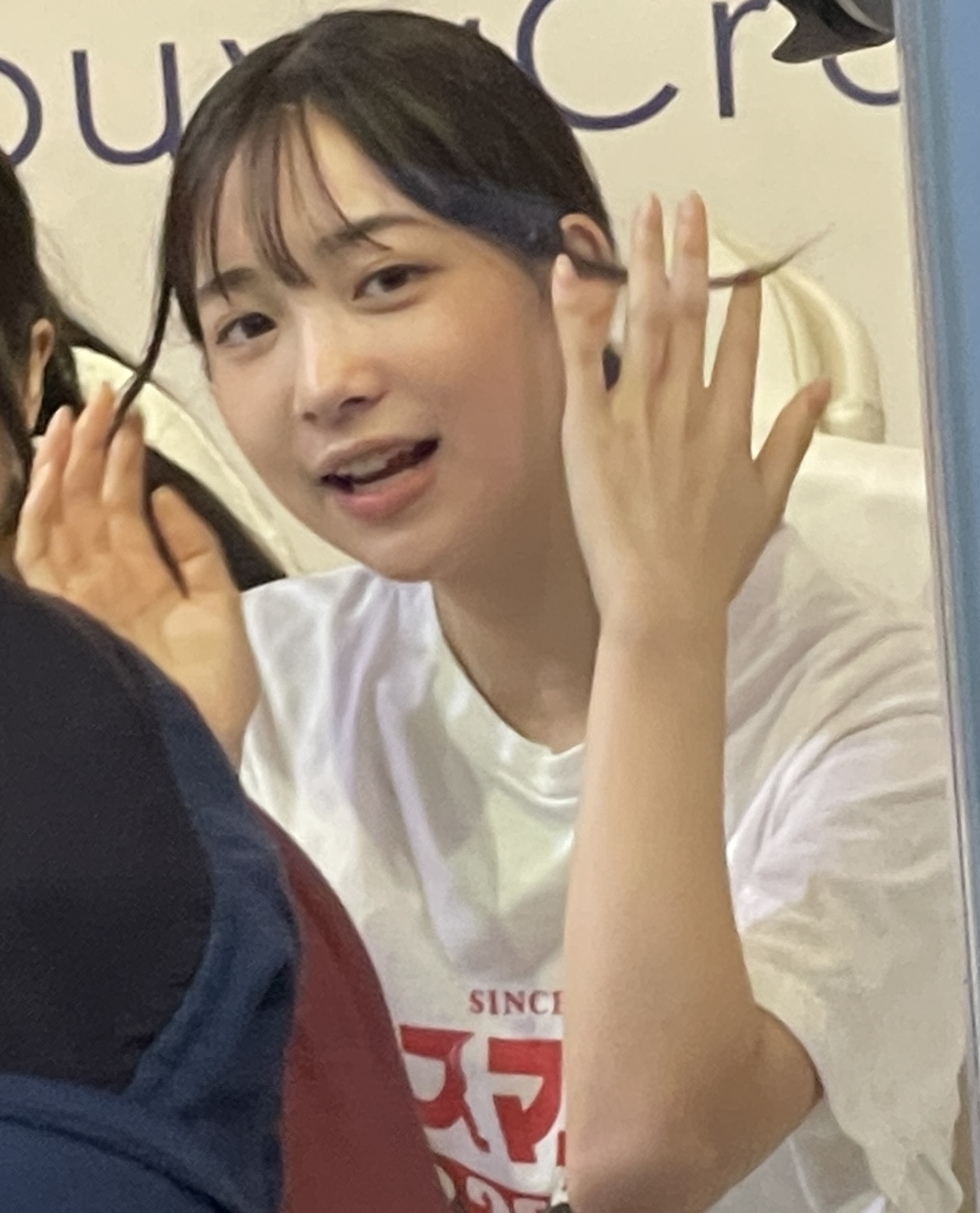
- Imamori in 2024
- Born: March 26, 2006 (age 20); Miyazaki Prefecture, Japan
- Occupations: Gravure model; actress
- Years active: 2022–2025
- Modeling information
- Height: 165 cm (5 ft 5 in)
- Hair color: black
- Eye color: brown

Japanese name
- Kanji: 今森 茉耶
- Hiragana: いまもり まや
Transcriptions
- Romanization: Imamori Maya

Maya Imamori (今森 茉耶, Imamori Maya; born March 26, 2006) is a Japanese former gravure model and actress. Originally a TikToker, she was scouted in 2022 and gained attention through her gravure modelling work, which led to several television drama and film roles. She was caught in a scandal in late 2025 and subsequently retired from the entertainment industry.

== Early life and career ==
Imamori was born in Miyazaki Prefecture on March 26, 2006. She has one older sister and is of mixed Filipino descent.

She began posting videos on TikTok in junior high school, and was scouted in October 2022 and signed with her former agency, Seju. She made her gravure debut in March 27 of the following year, in Shueisha's Weekly Playboy magazine, and gained attention as "Miyazaki's new star".

In May 2023, she made it to the top 16 finalists of Kodansha's "Miss Magazine 2023" contest from a total of 3,204 contestants. On August 29, it was announced that she had been selected as the Grand Prix winner of "Miss Magazine 2023" and appeared on the cover and in the lead photo spread of the September 4 issue of Weekly Young Magazine. Her first photo book, "Love Begins," was released on August 28, 2024.

In the 49th Super Sentai series No.1 Sentai Gozyuger, which aired on February 16, 2025, Imamori portrayed the role of Sumino Ichikawa/Gozyu Unicorn, the first female "Black Ranger". However, she lost both the role and her contract with her agency on November 8, 2025, after she was allegedly caught drinking while underage, since the minimum legal drinking age in Japan is twenty years old. Imamori has posted an apology on her personal Instagram account regarding the report.

Due to the incident, Imamori's character would be heavily edited around for the next few episodes, with the character only appearing in fight scenes and transformed, with actress Ayaka Maekawa dubbing over her lines. Toei later recast the character's live actress beginning with the 40th episode, with Imamori replaced by Kohaku Shida from the 46th Super Sentai series Avataro Sentai Donbrothers. In November 2025, it was reported that Imamori's scenes in The Girl at the End of the Line will be taken out due to the aforementioned incident.

In March 2026, Imamori opened new social media accounts to interact with her fans. She revealed in an interview that she was studying to obtain her real estate license and planned to take the test in October.

== Filmography ==
=== Film ===
Year	Title	Role	Notes	Ref(s)
2024	Kokoro no Futa: Yuki Furu Machi de	Shiina Yayoi		
2024	Sana: Let Me Hear	Mari Kohinata		
2025	No.1 Sentai Gozyuger: TegaSword of Resurrection	Sumino Ichikawa/Gozyu Unicorn		
2025	Yoyogi Johnny	Izumo		
2026	The Girl at the End of the Line	Kiyoko's classmate	Deleted scene	

=== Television ===
Year	Title	Role	Notes	Ref(s)
2024	Mr. Mitsuya's Strategic Feeding	Yupi		
2024	My Diary	High school girl		
2024	The Final Lesson: Only Survivors Graduate	Eri Matsumoto	Web short drama	
2025	No.1 Sentai Gozyuger	Sumino Ichikawa/Gozyu Unicorn	ep 1, 3-36	
2025	Gozyuger Fill-in Plan: No.1 Confessional	Sumino Ichikawa	Web series	

== Bibliography ==
=== Photobooks ===
- "Love Begins" (August 28, 2024, Kodansha) ISBN 978-4065370063
- "Tokyo Back Alley Walk Meets Seju" (April 1, 2025)

=== Digital Photobook ===
Year	Title	Magazine	Publisher	Ref(s)
2023	"Miyazaki Itsuzai"	Weekly Playboy	Shueisha	
2023	"Miss Magazine 2023①"	Weekly Young Magazine	Kodansha	
2023	"Miss Magazine Asobiba! Miss Magazine 2023 Solo Gravure SP!"	Weekly Young Magazine	Kodansha	
2024	"Miss Magazine's Asobiba! What if Miss Magazine was a maid?"	Weekly Young Magazine	Kodansha	
2024	"Miss Magazine's Asobiba! Miss Magazine members take on fitness challenges!"	Weekly Young Magazine	Kodansha	
2024	"Miss Magazine's Asobiba! Retro Gravure"	Weekly Young Magazine	Kodansha	
2024	"Miss Magazine's Asobiba! Spy & Assassin"	Weekly Young Magazine	Kodansha	
2024	"Miss Magazine's Asobiba! How to spend a rainy day"	Weekly Young Magazine	Kodansha	
2024	"Miss Magazine's Asobiba! Summer Vacation!"	Weekly Young Magazine	Kodansha	
2024	"Miss Magazine's Asobiba! 2023 Unreleased Masterpiece Selection SP!"	Weekly Young Magazine	Kodansha	
2024	"I Love You, I Hate You, I Love You, I Hate You, I Love You...:Prologue"	Weekly Palyboy	Shueisha	
2025	"The new heroine is "The Number One Azato Girl"	Weekly Palyboy	Shueisha	
