= List of Kamen Rider Gotchard characters =

The main heroes of Kamen Rider Gotchard. From left to right: Supana Kurogane, Houtaro Ichinose, and Rinne Kudo.

Kamen Rider Gotchard (仮面ライダーガッチャード, Kamen Raidā Gatchādo) is a Japanese tokusatsu series that serves as the 34th installment in the Kamen Rider franchise and the fifth entry in the Reiwa era.

== Main characters ==
=== Houtaro Ichinose ===
Houtaro Ichinose (一ノ瀬 宝太郎, Ichinose Hōtarō) is a second-year freshman at Furasu High School (富良州高校, Furasu Kōkō). He becomes a student at Alchemist Academy after he was entrusted by Fuga Kudo with the GotcharDriver (ガッチャードライバー, Gatchādoraibā) belt and the remaining Chemies during their brief encounter with each other, which ultimately led the former to rediscover his childhood past connections with the Chemies. Following the Dark Kings' return and Glion's resurrection, Houtaro's ideals in coexistence between humans and Chemies were challenged by his increasing rivalry with Supana and the public's distrust against them. Eventually, by the time Glion threatens to cover the entire planet in gold, Houtaro comes to the conclusion of creating a second planet Earth for the Chemies to inhabit and defeats him once and for all. Realizing that the general population has yet to accept the existence of Chemies, Houtaro and the entire Alchemist Academy decide to make recurring visits to the second Earth while working his way to achieve his dream of peaceful coexistence. After graduating high school, he studies to obtain a chef's license.

Utilizing the Hopper1 and Steamliner Ride Chemy Cards (ライドケミーカード, Raido Kemī Kādo) in conjunction with the GotcharDriver, Houtaro can transform into Kamen Rider Gotchard Steamhopper (スチームホッパー, Suchīmuhoppā). While transformed, he gains the use of the Wild Mode (ワイルドモード, Wairudo Mōdo) ability to transform into a non-humanoid state based on his current form. He also wields the Gotcharge Gun (ガッチャージガン, Gatchāji Gan) and the bladed Gotchartornado (ガッチャートルネード, Gatchātorunēdo) bow. Later in the series, he acquires the Exgotchalibur (エクスガッチャリバー, Ekusugatcharibā) sword, which can be reconfigured into an adapter that combines with the GotcharDriver. While certain optimal Ride Chemy Card combinations known as a Gotchanko Chemy (ガッチャンコケミー, Gatchanko Kemī) allow him to assume a variety of forms via other combinations of cards, Houtaro can combine the GotcharDriver with other devices and/or advanced Chemies to achieve the following evolutions of his Rider form:

- Kamen Rider Super Gotchard (仮面ライダースーパーガッチャード, Kamen Raidā Sūpā Gatchādo): An upgrade form accessed by combining the GotcharDriver and Exgotchalibur while using the Hopper1 and Steamliner Ride Chemy Cards in conjunction with the former and any Level Number 10 Ride Chemy Card in conjunction with the latter that can switch between varying Cross (クロス, Kurosu) sub-forms. If necessary, Houtaro can wield the Exgotchalibur in battle.
  - Super Gotchard Cross UFO-X (スーパーガッチャードクロスユーフォーエックス, Sūpā Gatchādo Kurosu Yūfōekkusu): The yellow-colored evolved form of Steamhopper accessed from the Hopper1, Steamliner, and UFO-X Ride Chemy Cards that grants teleportation capabilities and the use of the twin flying saucer-like Cross Recorder (クロスレコーダ, Kurosu Rekōda) drones for combat assistance. In this form, Houtaro is equipped with the chest-mounted levitating Cross Astra (クロスアストラ, Kurosu Asutora) disc.
  - Super Gotchard Cross X-Rex (スーパーガッチャードクロスエックスレックス, Sūpā Gatchādo Kurosu Ekkusurekku): The red-colored evolved form of Steamhopper accessed from the Hopper1, Steamliner, and X-Rex Ride Chemy Cards that grants the use of the expandable X-Rex Tail (エックスレックステール, Ekkusurekku Tēru). In this form, Houtaro is equipped with the chest-mounted sonokinetic Cross Rainium (クロスレイニアム, Kurosu Reiniamu) jaw and a pair of clawed Cross Trample (クロストランプル, Kurosu Toranpuru) sabatons.
  - Super Gotchard Cross X Wizard (スーパーガッチャード クロスクロスウィザード, Sūpā Gatchādo Kurosu Kurosu Wizādo): The purple-colored evolved form of Steamhopper accessed from the Hopper1, Steamliner, and X Wizard Ride Chemy Cards. This form appears exclusively in the sequel novel Novel: Kamen Rider Gotchard University.
  - Super Gotchard Cross Xeggdrasil (スーパーガッチャード クロスゼグドラシル, Sūpā Gatchādo Kurosu Zegudorashiru): The brown-colored evolved form of Steamhopper accessed from the Hopper1, Steamliner, and Xeggdrasil Ride Chemy Cards. This form appears exclusively in the sequel novel Novel: Kamen Rider Gotchard University.
- Kamen Rider Fire Gotchard (仮面ライダーファイヤーガッチャード, Kamen Raidā Faiyā Gatchādo): An upgrade form accessed by combining the GotcharDriver and the Gotcharigniter (ガッチャーイグナイター, Gatchāigunaitā) belt buckle while using any Gotchanko Chemy combination in conjunction with the former that allows Houtaro to assume pyrokinetic versions of his preexisting forms. While transformed, he is equipped with the back-mounted Fire Dokkan (ファイヤードッカーン, Faiyā Dokkān) jet engine, which grants warp speed capabilities. However, the Gotcharigniter must be cooled down after each use, as overusing it will cause Houtaro's transformation to overheat and burn him.
- Kamen Rider Iron Gotchard (仮面ライダーアイアンガッチャード, Kamen Raidā Aian Gatchādo): Houtaro's super form accessed by combining the GotcharDriver and Tenliner while using the latter's eponymous Ride Chemy Card in conjunction with the former that grants superhuman durability. While transformed, he is equipped with a pair of self-propelling Heavy Expressure (ヘビーエクスプレッシャー, Hebī Ekusupuresshā) gauntlets, which can be augmented by using up to two other Ride Chemy Cards at once. However, prolonged use of this form will strain Houtaro's body, rendering him fatigued once he cancels his transformation.
  - Kamen Rider Platina Gotchard (仮面ライダープラチナガッチャード, Kamen Raidā Purachina Gatchādo): The evolved form of Iron Gotchard accessed by combining the GotcharDriver, Tenliner, and Crosshopper while using the latter two's eponymous Ride Chemy Cards in conjunction with the former that grants the use of the Unison (ユニゾン, Yunizon) ability to channel the powers of up to five other Ride Chemy Cards at once for enhanced attacks.
- Kamen Rider Rainbow Gotchard (仮面ライダーレインボーガッチャード, Kamen Raidā Reinbō Gatchādo): Houtaro's final form accessed by combining the GotcharDriver and Nijigon while using the latter's two eponymous Ride Chemy Cards in conjunction with the former that increases his alchemical capabilities to its fullest potential and grants the ability to summon Rainbow Chemies and/or enhanced copies of his preexisting forms known as the Gotcharbrothers (ガッチャーブラザーズ, Gatchāburazāzu) for combat assistance. If necessary, Gotcharbrothers Steamhopper can borrow the Exgotchalibur to transform into an enhanced version of Kamen Rider Super Gotchard. However, the Gotcharbrothers can only be summoned if Houtaro assembles all 101 Chemies into a team, as he will lose access to this ability if an unused Chemy is turned into a Malgam.
- Kamen Rider Star Gotchard (仮面ライダースターガッチャード, Kamen Raidā Sutā Gatchādo): A special form accessed by combining the GotcharDriver and Exgotchalibur while using the Hopper1 and Steamliner Ride Chemy Cards in conjunction with the former and the X Assemble (エックスアッセンブル, Ekkusu Assenburu) Ride Chemy Card in conjunction with the latter that grants the combined powers of BeetlX, Lixion, X Fortress, Xeggdrasil, and Exceedfighter. This form appears exclusively in the crossover film Kamen Rider the Winter Movie: Gotchard & Geats Strongest Chemy ★ Gotcha Great Operation.
- Kamen Rider Miracle Gotchard (仮面ライダーミラクルガッチャード, Kamen Raidā Mirakuru Gatchādo): A special form accessed by combining the GotcharDriver and Nijigon while using the Hopper101 and Gigantliner Ride Chemy Cards in conjunction with the former that grants size-shifting capabilities. This form appears exclusively in the film Kamen Rider Gotchard: The Future Daybreak.

Houtaro Ichinose is portrayed by Junsei Motojima (本島 純政, Motojima Junsei). As a child, Houtaro is portrayed by Ibuki Ōsako (大迫 芽生, Ōsako Ibuki).

==== Future Houtaro ====
Future Houtaro (未来の宝太郎, Mirai no Hōtarō) is the cynical counterpart of Houtaro Ichinose who briefly appeared in the series as his Rider form before his identity was revealed in the film Kamen Rider Gotchard: The Future Daybreak. After Glion successfully opened the Door of Darkness and caused him to lose his friends and right eye in the process, Houtaro fell into despair and his grief evolved his Ride Chemy Cards into Daybreak Chemy Cards (デイブレイクケミーカード, Deibureiku Kemī Kādo), with Gotchard himself becoming the color-inverted Kamen Rider Gotchard Daybreak (仮面ライダーガッチャードデイブレイク, Kamen Raidā Gatchādo Deibureiku). Following the acquisition of his own Gotcharigniter, Future Houtaro went into the past and diverges his timeline into an alternate future by invoking his younger self's Fire Gotchard transformation at an earlier point. Once his mission ended, he returned to his timeline to continue his fight and rescue survivors of Glion's regime.

His actions in creating a diverged timeline however caught the interest of the alternate Glion into spreading his influence to the present day timeline and the Alchemys Union joining Future Houtaro's fight. Having experienced his friends' deaths, Future Houtaro tries to dissuade them from joining him, but the encouragement from his present self and Rinne allows Future Houtaro to regain hope and reestablish contact with his Chemies, in particular his timeline's Rinne. After defeating Kamen Rider Dorado and the Dark King, Kamen Rider Gotchard Shining Daybreak travels through time to stop the monster from terrorizing the past, creating a bootstrap paradox wherein he is the Kamen Rider of Daybreak legend. (Note: The summer festival scene during the credits of the film takes place in a diverged timeline created by Gotchard Shining Daybreak.)

Similarly to his past self, Future Houtaro utilizes the Daybreak Hopper1 and Daybreak Steamliner Daybreak Chemy Cards in conjunction with the GotcharDriver (Daybreak Ver.) (ガッチャードライバー (デイブレイクVer.), Gatchādoraibā (Deibureiku Vājon)) belt to transform into Kamen Rider Gotchard Daybreak Steamhopper. While transformed, he gains the use of Wild Mode to transform into a non-humanoid state based on his current form. He also wields the Gotcharge Gun and Gotchartornado. Additionally, he can assume the following evolutions of his Rider form:

- Kamen Rider Fire Gotchard Daybreak (仮面ライダーファイヤーガッチャードデイブレイク, Kamen Raidā Faiyā Gatchādo Deibureiku): An upgrade form accessed by combining the GotcharDriver (Daybreak Ver.) and Gotcharigniter while using the Daybreak Hopper1 and Daybreak Steamliner Daybreak Chemy Cards in conjunction with the former that grants pyrokinesis.
- Kamen Rider Gotchard Shining Daybreak (仮面ライダーガッチャードシャイニングデイブレイク, Kamen Raidā Gatchādo Shainingu Deibureiku): Future Houtaro's final form accessed from the Level Number EX Shining Hopper1 (シャイニングホッパー1, Shainingu Hoppā Wan) and Shining Steamliner (シャイニングスチームライナー, Shainingu Suchīmurainā) Ride Chemy Cards that grants solarkinesis. This form appears exclusively in the film Kamen Rider Gotchard: The Future Daybreak.

Kamen Rider Gotchard Daybreak/Future Houtaro Ichinose is portrayed by Daigo. The flashback to his younger self is portrayed by Junsei Motojima, who also portrays the present-day Houtaro.

=== Rinne Kudo ===
Rinne Kudo (九堂 りんね, Kudō Rin'ne) is Houtaro's classmate and a student at both Furasu High School and Alchemist Academy. During the events of the crossover film Kamen Rider the Winter Movie: Gotchard & Geats Strongest Chemy ★ Gotcha Great Operation, she reunites with her father Fuga in the dream world where he entrusts her with the AlchemisDriver (アルケミスドライバー, Arukemisudoraibā) belt and the High Alchemist Ring (ハイアルケミストリング, Hai Arukemisuto Ringu), granting her the ability to transform into Kamen Rider Majade (仮面ライダーマジェード, Kamen Raidā Majēdo). However, following her first transformation, Rinne loses access to her Rider powers until she saves Atropos from the Cerberus Malgam. After high school graduation, she studies abroad in the UK.

Utilizing the Unicon and The Sun Ride Chemy Cards in conjunction with the AlchemisDriver and High Alchemist Ring, Rinne can transform into Kamen Rider Majade Sununicorn (サンユニコーン, San'yunikōn). While transformed, she gains anti-magic capabilities. She can also use other Gotchanko Chemy combinations from the Fantastic and Cosmic categories to assume a variety of forms. If necessary, she can borrow one of Houtaro's weapons for her use in battle.

Following Atropos' sacrifice, Rinne acquires the Majesty Driver (マジェスティードライバー, Majesutī Doraibā) belt and the Promise Alchemist Ring (プロミスアルケミストリング, Puromisu Arukemisuto Ringu), which she can use in conjunction with the Twilight Unicon and Twilight The Sun Ride Chemy Cards to transform into her final form; Kamen Rider Twilight Majade (仮面ライダートワイライトマジェード, Kamen Raidā Towairaito Majēdo). While transformed, she gains photo-umbrakinesis.

In the film Kamen Rider Gotchard: The Future Daybreak, Rinne's alternate self was one of the many casualties of Glion's regime, whereupon her death resulted with her spirit merging with Daybreak The Sun. However, as Houtaro became cynical and shut off his communication with his Chemies, Rinne's spirit was unable to reach him until their present selves encouraged him, allowing her spirit to reach Future Houtaro and lend her support to Gotchard Daybreak.

Rinne Kudo is portrayed by Reiyo Matsumoto (松本 麗世, Matsumoto Reiyo). As a child, Rinne is portrayed by Liliana Ōno (大野 りりあな, Ōno Ririana).

=== Supana Kurogane ===
Supana Kurogane (黒鋼 スパナ, Kurogane Supana) is an alchemist, a graduate of Alchemist Academy, and Houtaro's rival who initially viewed the Chemies as tools instead of living beings. His parents, Renchi (レンチ) and Suzu (スズ), were alchemists who were killed by Glion 10 years prior to the series. After accepting his past and managing to avoid becoming an unwitting pawn of Glion's schemes, Supana creates his own Alchemist Ring (アルケミストリング, Arukemisuto Ringu) to honor his parents' sacrifice, though he tends to fight his opponents alone. Realizing the horror of the general populations reaction to the Chemies' existence, Supana attempts to absorb them in a self-destructive charge against the Dark Kings, but was stopped by Houtaro before his plan can be carried out. Despite losing the ValvaraDriver (ヴァルバラドライバー, Varubaradoraibā) belt and realizing how far he had fallen, Supana's renewed resolve to fight alongside the Alchemist Academy allows him to restore his belt into the upgraded ValvaraDriver Kurogane (ヴァルバラドライバー黒鋼, Varubaradoraibā Kurogane).

Throughout the series, Supana has assumed the following forms as he wields the wrench-like Valvarusher (ヴァルバラッシャー, Barubarasshā) pistol sword in battle:

- Valvarad (ヴァルバラド, Varubarado): Supana's Kamen Rider-esque warrior form accessed from the Madwheel Ride Chemy Card in conjunction with the Valvarusher that can use other Ride Chemy Cards from the Vehicle category to assume a variety of Custom (カスタム, Kasutamu) forms, which equip him with a forearm-mounted Berserk (バーサーク, Bāsāku) weapon based on the corresponding card.
- Kamen Rider Valvarad (仮面ライダーヴァルバラド, Kamen Raidā Varubarado): Supana's Rider form accessed from the Machwheel and Daiohni Ride Chemy Cards in conjunction with the ValvaraDriver that can use other Gotchanko Chemy combinations from the Vehicle and Occult categories to assume a variety of Customs, which grant the combined powers of the corresponding cards. He later acquires evolutions of his Rider form.
  - Kamen Rider Valvarad Kurogane (仮面ライダーヴァルバラド黒鋼, Kamen Raidā Varubarado Kurogane): Supana's final form accessed from the Metal Machwheel and Metal Daiohni Ride Chemy Cards in conjunction with the ValvaraDriver Kurogane that clads him in metallic armor powered by artificial intelligence and equipped with a pair of twin palm-mounted lasers. While transformed, he dual wields a pair of Valvarushers, which can combine into a double-bladed sword. As of the V-Cinema Kamen Rider Gotchard: Graduations, Supana loses access to this form due to the ValvaraDriver Kurogane's destruction by Ouroboros. However, Kyoka was able to rebuild it into the original ValvaraDriver and tune up the belt's output to be on par with its upgraded self.
  - Kamen Rider Valvarad GT (仮面ライダーヴァルバラドGT, Kamen Raidā Varubarado Jī Tī): A special form accessed from the Daiohni GT and Gigantliner GT Ride Chemy Cards that equips Supana with a pair of self-propelling GT High Pressure (GTハイプレッシャー, GT Hai Puresshā) gauntlets. This form appears exclusively in Kamen Rider Gotchard: Graduations.

Supana Kurogane is portrayed by Yasunari Fujibayashi (藤林 泰也, Fujibayashi Yasunari). As a teenager, Supana is portrayed by Yumeto Takahashi (髙橋 夢人, Takahashi Yumeto).

== Recurring characters ==
=== Alchemist Academy ===
Alchemist Academy (錬金アカデミー, Renkin Akademī) is a secret school for young alchemists located in the basement of Furasu High School and run by the Alchemys Union (錬金連合, Renkin Rengō). Each student carries a Chemy Riser (ケミーライザー, Kemī Raizā) device, which is used in conjunction with Search Cards (サーチカード, Sāchi Kādo) to locate Chemies and Blank Cards (ブランクカード, Buranku Kādo) to capture them. Following Glion's defeat, with the union freed from his conspiracy, the academy is now under new management.

==== Renge Icho ====
Renge Icho (銀杏 蓮華, Ichō Renge) is a student at the academy who speaks in a Kansai accent and aspires to be an alchemist in hopes of repaying her mother and escaping their impoverished life. After academy graduation, she is assigned to Alchemys Union's Kansai branch.

Renge Icho is portrayed by Oto Abe (安倍 乙, Abe Oto). As a child, Renge is portrayed by Madoka Hara (原 まどか, Hara Madoka).

==== Sabimaru Tsuruhara ====
Sabimaru Tsuruhara (鶴原 錆丸, Tsuruhara Sabimaru) is an introverted student at the academy who relies on his artificial intelligence, Isaac (アイザック, Aizakku), as his means of communication. Despite being Houtaro's senior, the two became fast friends due to their shared interest for Chemies, especially UFO-X who inspired Sabimaru to create his own version of the Chemy Riser, nicknamed the "Sabi Riser" (サビーライザー, Sabī Raizā) by Renge, to summon it. During the rise of Level Number 10 Chemies, Sabimaru briefly becomes the first host of the DreaDriver against his will and had his knowledge of Chemies exploited against his own allies until Super Gotchard saved him from having his life force drained by the belt's power. After academy graduation, he helps his brother Kenichi with his research.

Sabimaru Tsuruhara is portrayed by Rikiya Tomizono (富園 力也, Tomizono Rikiya), who also voices Isaac. As a child, Sabimaru is portrayed by Kotarō Kawada (川田 琥太郎, Kawada Kotarō).

==== Minato ====
Minato (ミナト) is a history teacher at the high school and a teacher at the academy. He was also a student of Glion before witnessing him murder other students, including Minato's best friend Daiki Suzuya (錫屋 大輝, Suzuya Daiki). When Glion finally makes his move and reveals himself as the Three Dark Sisters' master in the present, Minato goes undercover by joining his side while becoming the fourth Kamen Rider Dread, in order to save his current students from neither suffering similar fates nor becoming another one of Glion's pawns behind the scenes. Once he finally overcomes his survivor guilt, Minato leaves Glion and returns to his students' side. He later marries Kyoka.

Minato is portrayed by Rikuto Kumaki (熊木 陸斗, Kumaki Rikuto).

=== Three Dark Sisters ===
The Three Dark Sisters (冥黒の三姉妹, Meikoku no Sanshimai) are a trio of homunculus alchemists who work for Glion. In the film Kamen Rider Gotchard: The Future Daybreak, their alternate selves were dismissed by Glion after he created the Dark Death Masks as enforcers to his regime, forcing Atropos and Clotho to defect to Future Houtaro's side at some point after Lachesis' death.

==== Atropos ====
Atropos (アトロポス, Atoroposu) is the oldest sister who resembles a child and is modeled after Rinne Kudo. She later becomes the fifth Kamen Rider Dread. Initially devoted to Glion due to the circumstances behind her creation, she was discarded by her creator after he achieved his goals, eventually sacrificing herself to protect Rinne from Gaelijah's attack. Despite her death, her spirit was able to intervene by assisting Twilight Majade and countering Gaelijah's prediction, resulting in the female Dark King's death.

Atropos is portrayed by Itono Okita (沖田 絃乃, Okita Itono).

==== Clotho ====
Clotho (クロトー, Kurotō) is the middle sister with enhanced physical strength. While devoted to Glion and the Dark Kings' cause, Clotho came into conflict with her personal interest after Lachesis defected to the Alchemist Academy and Atropos' slow downfall into insanity. Seeing her sisters die by the very superiors she served, Clotho goes into a suicidal charge against Kamen Rider Eld, but fails and dies by her creator's hands.

Clotho initially fights with Malgam forms through captured Chemies, with Glion's brief assistance allowing her to transform into enhanced golden Malgam forms. She later becomes the third Kamen Rider Dread, initially sharing the DreaDriver with Lachesis until she gains full ownership after the latter's defection and Glion's brief demise. After being empowered by Gigist, she gains the ability to transform into the armored Clotho Rebis (クロトーレビス, Kurotō Rebisu), with Gaelijah eventually reverting her to normal when the transformation came at the cost of her sanity.

Clotho is portrayed by Kanon Miyahara (宮原 華音, Miyahara Kanon).

==== Lachesis ====
Lachesis (ラケシス, Rakeshisu) is the youngest sister and the most agile, who is modeled after an aspiring singer named Risa Arisugawa. She later becomes the second Kamen Rider Dread, sharing with Clotho. Following her betrayal of Glion, Lachesis becomes an ally to the Alchemys Union and Kyoka's assistant. She wants to become Supana's lover once she is human, but is killed by Glion.

Similarly to Supana, Lachesis utilizes the Repli Madwheel Replichemy Card in conjunction with a Valvarusher to transform into the second Valvarad.

Lachesis is portrayed by Alisa Sakamaki (坂巻 有紗, Sakamaki Arisa).

=== DreaDriver ===
The DreaDriver (ドレッドライバー, Doreddoraibā) is a malevolent sentient belt which was created by the Three Dark Sisters along with dark copies of the Ride Chemy Cards called Replichemy Cards (レプリケミーカード, Repurikemī Kādo) to counteract the likes of Kamen Rider Gotchard and Valvarad by either possessing its host or having one of the sisters utilize it to transform into Kamen Rider Dread (仮面ライダードレッド, Kamen Raidā Doreddo). However, normal humans who transform with this belt will have their life force drained.

Using Kenichi Saruhara's AI research, Glion modifies the DreaDriver to create the Dreatrooper (ドレットルーパー, Dorettorūpā), an autonomous version of Kamen Rider Dread that allows it to operate without a host. When Glion converts the entire planet Earth into gold, Clotho uses the DreaDriver in a last ditch effort to take down her creator, only to lose her life in the process. Glion summons Dreatrooper Type Army as reinforcements to his campaign, but all of them are converted into raw materials by Kamen Rider Gotchard which he uses to create a copy of planet Earth for the Chemies to inhabit.

In the alternate timeline where he achieved world domination, Glion managed to produce Dreatroopers en-masse, with Type Army serving as grunts while being led by the normal Dreatroopers and the Dark Death Masks to fight Daybreak and the other survivors. Dreatrooper Type Army made their way to the present day timeline to expand Glion's rule, but they were destroyed by the combined efforts of the Alchemist Academy, Kamen Riders Legend and Gavv, and a brief intervention from Tsukasa Kadoya.

A user of the DreaDriver utilizes the Repli Steamliner Replichemy Card in conjunction with the belt itself to transform into Kamen Rider Dread Type Zero (零式, Zeroshiki). While transformed, they can use other Replichemy Cards to grant themselves the use of either an enhanced ability or a Bloody (ブラッディー, Buraddī) weapon based on the corresponding card. Amidst its users, the DreaDriver acquires unique Replichemy Cards that can combine with Repli Steamliner to achieve stronger Types (式, Shiki) forms, which are as follows:

- Type One (壱式, Ichishiki): The silver-colored evolved form of Type Zero accessed from the Repli Steamliner and Unicon Replichemy Cards.
- Type Two (弐式, Nishiki): The crimson-colored evolved form of Type Zero accessed from the Repli Steamliner and Daiohni Replichemy Cards.
- Type Three (参式, Sanshiki): Dread's super form accessed from the Repli Steamliner, Unicon, and Daiohni Replichemy Cards.
- Type Army (軍式, Gunshiki): Mass-produced versions of the Dreatrooper who utilize the DreaDriver (MP) (ドレッドライバー (MP), Doreddoraibā (Emu Pī)) belt. While human-sized in the alternate timeline and act as enforcers to Glion's rule, the original timeline portray them as giants with gold converting powers.
- Type Final (終式, Shūshiki): Dread's final form accessed from the Repli Gigantliner Replichemy Card. This form appears exclusively in the stage show Kamen Rider Gotchard: Final Stage.

The DreaDriver is voiced by Ryōtarō Okiayu (置鮎 龍太郎, Okiayu Ryōtarō).

=== Ryo Kajiki ===
Ryo Kajiki (加治木 涼, Kajiki Ryō) is Houtaro's classmate and closest friend who believes that the supernatural exists. Due to his closeness to Houtaro, Kajiki is usually involved in several incidents related to the Chemies and the Kamen Riders, leading to his memories being frequently overwritten by Minato so that he could forget about them. However, such a procedure eventually puts such a strain on his mind that he recovers all his lost memories at the single sight of a Chemy or a Malgam. After high school graduation, he goes to university.

Ryo Kajiki is portrayed by Amon Kabe (加部 亜門, Kabe Amon).

=== Tamami Ichinose ===
Tamami Ichinose (一ノ瀬 珠美, Ichinose Tamami) is Houtaro's mother who runs the family restaurant Kitchen Ichinose (キッチンいちのせ, Kitchin Ichinose).

Tamami Ichinose is portrayed by Yoko Minamino (南野 陽子, Minamino Yōko).

=== Fuga Kudo ===
Fuga Kudo (九堂 風雅, Kudō Fūga) is Rinne's father and an alchemist who stole the Ride Chemy Cards a decade ago for reasons currently unknown, branded a traitor by the Alchemys Union, after discovering a dark conspiracy within the organization. Fuga remained hidden at the Ouroboros World (ウロボロス界, Uroborosu-kai) filled with alchemy formulas to protect the Chemies and GotcharDriver from falling into the wrong hands before entrusting Houtaro with the GotcharDriver and securing the Chemies as he is defeated by the Three Dark Sisters and creates homunculi in his image to act in his stead. One Fuga homunculus appears to aid the Kamen Riders as Kamen Rider Wind (仮面ライダーウインド, Kamen Raidā Uindo) before being killed by Glion for the Chemies in his possession, a second being killed by Clotho in his hideout, and a third helping Houtaro and Rinne travel to an alternative future timeline before disappearing. Following Glion's defeat, Fuga's name has been cleared, and he is currently reconciling with Rinne, who now vow to surpass his level.

Similarly to Rinne, Fuga utilizes the Gigabaham and Kuroana Ride Chemy Cards in conjunction with an AlchemisDriver and High Alchemist Ring to transform into Kamen Rider Wind Blackbahamut (ブラックバハムート, Burakkubahamūto). While transformed, he gains aero-nihilikinesis.

Fuga Kudo is portrayed by Kanji Ishimaru (石丸 幹二, Ishimaru Kanji).

=== Kyoka Edami ===
Kyoka Edami (枝見 鏡花, Edami Kyōka) is Supana's mentor, adoptive mother, and an alchemist who specializes in inventing its related gears. She was an acquaintance of Supana's parents, who were killed by Glion, and is one of the few Union members who found out the dark alchemist's conspiracy which framed Rinne Kudo's father, Fuga. She later marries Minato.

Kyoka Edami is portrayed by Saki Fukuda (福田 沙紀, Fukuda Saki).

=== Glion ===
Glion (グリオン, Gurion) is the main antagonist of the series who is the Three Dark Sisters' father and a homunculus alchemist the Dark Kings created who framed Fuga Kudo for treason and brainwashed the executives of the Alchemys Union to his will 10 years prior to the series. He was also formerly a professor whom Minato studied under before the latter witnessed him murder other students, including Minato's best friend. His main goal is to open the Door of Darkness (暗黒の扉, Ankoku no Tobira) in order to obtain the power to cover everything in gold. He later becomes the sixth Kamen Rider Dread as he uses the Chemies to form a pact with the Dark Kings, only to be dragged away and absorbed by Germain after being defeated by Kamen Rider Platina Gotchard. However, Glion later returns after Germain's defeat at the hands of Houtaro and his friends. After salvaging all of the Dark Kings' Philosopher Stone pieces, he prepares to transform Earth into gold, only for Gotchard to undo all the damages he made to create a copy of Earth before meeting his end by the young Rider and the rest of the Chemies, while also earning his respect towards the beauty of Houtaro's chemistry.

Utilizing the El Dragon Ride Chemy Card in conjunction with the EldoraDriver (エルドラドライバー, Erudoradoraibā) belt, Glion can transform into Kamen Rider Eld (仮面ライダーエルド, Kamen Raidā Erudo).

In an alternative future timeline, Glion utilizes the Dark Ether (ダークエーテル, Dark Ēteru Kādo) Ride Chemy Card in conjunction with the EldoraDriver to transform into Kamen Rider Dorado (仮面ライダードラド, Kamen Raidā Dorado). While transformed, he wields a scythe.

Glion is portrayed by Kenta Kamakari (鎌苅 健太, Kamakari Kenta).

=== Dark Kings ===
The Dark Kings (冥黒王, Meikokuō) are a trio of evil alchemists from the realm beyond the Door of Darkness whom Glion made a pact with in order to turn the entire world into a golden wasteland.

In the early days of alchemy, they abandoned their humanity using the power of Philosopher's Stone and became an entity known as the Dark King. 120 years prior to the series, the Dark King was sealed away behind the Door of Darkness. In the present, the Dark King understood the current situation and split itself into three entities again.

==== Gigist ====
Gigist (ギギスト, Gigisuto) is the founder and master of theurgy. He is also the demon who invaded the world 120 years ago and created the two original Chemies, Gaiard and Dragonalos. After Glion's initial defeat, Gigist becomes the first of his kin to exit the Door of Darkness, creating improvised Malgam transformations and aiming for the Philosopher's Stone within Houtaro. After forcing Gotchard to kill Hopper1 Malgam out of mercy, his actions lead to Nijigon's emergence and all 101 Chemies retrieved by the Alchemys Union, forcing him to rejoin his comrades out of desperation. He is destroyed by Kamen Rider Valvarad Kurogane.

Gigist is voiced by Ryōtarō Okiayu.

==== Germain ====
Germain (ジェルマン, Jeruman) is the founder and master of alchemy who can create a Golem (ゴーレム, Gōremu) as his reinforcements. Germain initially absorbed Glion into his body upon his defeat by Kamen Rider Platina Gotchard but at some point after exiting the Door of Darkness, Atropos takes advantage of his defeat by the Kamen Riders to restore Glion, doing so at the cost of Germain's existence. His position is taken over by Glion, as well as his ability to generate Golems.

Germain is voiced by Kōhei Amasaki (天﨑 滉平, Amasaki Kōhei).

==== Gaelijah ====
Gaelijah (ガエリヤ, Gaeriya) is the founder and master of astrology, who can transform former Malgam hosts into their monster forms via leftover Chemy Factor (ケミー因子, Kemī Inshi) from their corresponding Chemy and create a Golem as her reinforcements. She is destroyed by Twilight Majade.

Gaelijah is voiced by Ayasa Itō (伊藤 彩沙, Itō Ayasa).

=== Ho-Oh Kaguya Quartz ===
Ho-Oh Kaguya Quartz (鳳桜・カグヤ・クォーツ, Hōō Kaguya Kwōtsu) is a mysterious man from an alternate universe who first appeared in the web special Kamen Rider Gotchard vs. Kamen Rider Legend. Having once been rescued by Kamen Rider Decade as a child, Kaguya follows in his rescuer's footsteps by designing his own Rider System to become Kamen Rider Legend (仮面ライダーレジェンド, Kamen Raidā Rejendo) and summons Houtaro to help improve the latter as a proper Kamen Rider. After defeating Gengetsu, Kaguya returns Houtaro to his world after the two begin to acknowledge each other's strengths.

Utilizing its eponymous Ride Chemy Card in conjunction with the LegenDriver (レジェンドライバー, Rejendoraibā) belt, Kaguya can transform into Kamen Rider Legend. While transformed, he can use Kamen Rider legacy versions of the Ride Chemy Cards called Legend Rider Chemy Cards (レジェンドライダーケミーカード, Rejendo Raidā Kemī Kādo) to assume the form of a past Kamen Rider. He also wields the motorcycle-like Legend Ride Magnum (レジェンドライドマグナム, Rejendo Raido Magunamu) handgun, which allows him to summon copies of past Kamen Riders for combat assistance.

During the invasion of Hundred, Kaguya acquires the belt buckle-like Legend Kamen Riser (レジェンドカメンライザー, Rejendo Kamen Raizā) firearm, which he can combine with the LegenDriver while using the Kamen Rider Legendary Legend (仮面ライダーレジェンダリーレジェンド, Kamen Raidā Rejendarī Rejendo) Ride Chemy Card in conjunction with the former to transform into his eponymous final form. While transformed, he can use variants of the Legend Rider Chemy Cards to assume a past Kamen Rider's final form as well as summon copies of their default and super forms for combat assistance.

During the events of the film Kamen Rider Gotchard: The Future Daybreak, Kaguya loses access to his Kamen Rider Legend card while fighting Dreatroopers. However, after being saved and encouraged by Tsukasa Kadoya, he gains new versions of his Ride Chemy Cards based on Decade's Rider Cards.

Ho-Oh Kaguya Quartz is portrayed by Seiichiro Nagata (永田 聖一朗, Nagata Seiichirō). As a child, Kaguya is portrayed by Tōya Shimizu (志水 透哉, Shimizu Tōya).

=== Chemies/Malgams ===
Chemies (ケミー, Kemī) are 101 monsters that were accidentally created by alchemy, normally serving as familiars of Kamen Riders that are summoned from their respective Ride Chemy Cards. They were stolen away from the Alchemys Union by Fuga, who was forced to release them into the world after entrusting the Chemies' safety to Houtaro. Chemies who end up being exposed to malice-consumed humans are merged with that human to become a single corrupt humanoid monster called a Malgam (マルガム, Marugamu), with Gotchard extracting the Chemy from its host while purifying them. However, a human host with goodwill can merge with a Chemy into a purified version of their Malgam form anytime, even when their eponymous Ride Chemy Card is used by a Kamen Rider. If a Malgam merges with other Chemies, the host evolves their Malgam form into a hybrid Mixtus (ミクスタス, Mikusutasu) form that transforms the absorbed Chemy into a weapon-like state. With the exception of X Wizard, Zukyumpire, and Nijigon, all Chemies are incapable of human speech.

Each Chemy/Malgam is based on one of 11 subspecies categories; Insect (インセクト, Insekuto), Job (ジョブ, Jobu), Vehicle (ビークル, Bīkuru), Animal (アニマル, Animaru), Artifact (アーティファクト, Ātifakuto), Plant (プラント, Puranto), Occult (オカルト, Okaruto), Ancient (エンシェント, Enshento), Cosmic (コズミック, Kozumikku), Fantastic (ファンタスティック, Fantasutikku), and Rainbow (レインボー, Reinbō). They are also ranked by Level Numbers (レベルナンバー, Reberu Nanbā), with Kamen Riders Gotchard, Majade, and Wind using two cards whose numbers collectively equal 10 to assume their forms and Kamen Rider Valvarad using two cards of the same number to assume his forms. Level Number 10 Chemies are regarded as the most powerful of their respective subspecies. Additionally, there is the crossover-exclusive Legend Rider (レジェンドライダー, Rejendo Raidā) subspecies, which are based on past Kamen Riders.

- Hopper1 (ホッパー1, Hoppā Wan): A grasshopper-themed Level Number 1 Insect subspecies. It first met Houtaro during his childhood, prior to having his memory erased, until they reunite in the present where the latter is now a high school student. After receiving the combined powers of the ten Level Number 10 Chemies, Hopper1 gains the ability to transform into its evolved Level Number 10 form; Crosshopper (クロスホッパー, Kurosuhoppā). It is later turned into the Hopper1 Malgam (Dark) (ホッパー1マルガム (冥黒), Hoppā Wan Marugamu (Meikoku)) by Gigist, only to be defeated by Iron Gotchard and reduced to a withered state until it is revived by Kamen Rider Rainbow Gotchard. During the events of the film Kamen Rider Gotchard: The Future Daybreak, Hopper1 transforms into the Level Number EX Hopper101 (ホッパー101, Hoppā Wan Ō Wan). During the final battle with Glion, Hopper1 transforms into Ultima Hopper1 (アルティマホッパー1, Arutima Hoppā Wan). (Ultima) Hopper1 is voiced by Misato Fukuen (福圓 美里, Fukuen Misato).
- Steamliner (スチームライナー, Suchīmurainā): A steam locomotive-themed Level Number 9 Vehicle subspecies. After Houtaro reunites with Fuga who teaches him to use a forbidden alchemical technique, Steamliner gains the ability to transform into its evolved Level Number 10 form; Tenliner (テンライナー, Tenrainā). During the events of the film Kamen Rider Gotchard: The Future Daybreak, Steamliner transforms into the Level Number EX Gigantliner (ギガントライナー, Gigantorainā) through Ninetail, Timelord, and Warptera's combined powers to allow the Alchemist Union to travel to Future Houtaro's dimension. During the final battle with Glion, Steamliner transforms into Ultima Steamliner (アルティマスチームライナー, Arutima Suchīmurainā). During the events of the V-Cinema Kamen Rider Gotchard: Graduations, Supana uses his alchemy to transform Tenliner into Gigantliner GT (ギガントライナーGT, Gigantorainā Jī Tī) as part of Kamen Rider Valvarad GT's form when Houtaro entrusted Steamliner to him. (Ultima) Steamliner is voiced by Nobuyuki Hiyama (檜山 修之, Hiyama Nobuyuki).
- Kamantis (カマンティス, Kamantisu): A mantis-themed Level Number 9 Insect subspecies whose Malgam form is known as Mantis Malgam (マンティスマルガム, Mantisu Marugamu). The Malgam form was used by Clotho when she forcefully absorbed the Chemy prior to her defeats by Kamen Riders Gotchard and Valvarad. Kamantis is voiced by Kazuya Ichijō (一条 和矢, Ichijō Kazuya).
- Odorippa (オドリッパ): A dancer-themed Level Number 1 Job subspecies. Odorippa is voiced by Yuki Kodaira (小平 有希, Kodaira Yūki).
- Skebows (スケボーズ, Sukebōzu): A skateboard-themed Level Number 2 Vehicle subspecies whose Malgam form is known as Skateboard Malgam (スケボーマルガム, Sukebō Marugamu). The Malgam form was used by a greedy robber named Sudō (須藤), only to be arrested following his defeat by Kamen Rider Gotchard. It is later turned into the Skebows Malgam (Dark) (スケボーズマルガム (冥黒), Sukebōzu Marugamu (Meikoku)) by Gigist, only to be defeated by Kamen Rider Platina Gotchard and reduced to a withered state until it is revived by Kamen Rider Rainbow Gotchard. Skebows is voiced by Yuki Kodaira. Sudō is portrayed by Tomokazu Enoki (榎木 智一, Enoki Tomokazu).
- Golddash (ゴルドダッシュ, Gorudodasshu): A motorcycle-themed Level Number 7 Vehicle subspecies. (Daybreak) Golddash is voiced by Kazuya Ichijō.
- Venomdake (ヴェノムダケ, Venomudake): A mushroom-themed Level Number 5 Plant subspecies whose Malgam form is known as Poisonous Mushroom Malgam (ポイゾナスマッシュルームマルガム, Poizonasu Masshurūmu Marugamu). The Malgam form was used by an envious office worker named Takemoto (茸本) and a gangster, only for the former to be defeated by Kamen Rider Gotchard and the latter by Kamen Rider Platina Gotchard. Venomdake is voiced by Taito Ban (坂 泰斗, Ban Taito). Takemoto and the gangster are portrayed by Satoshi Ogasawara (小笠原 覚, Ogasawara Satoshi) and Hiroyuki Matsumoto (松本 博之, Matsumoto Hiroyuki) respectively.
- Dokkirimajin (ドッキリマジーン, Dokkirimajīn): A magician-themed Level Number 2 Job subspecies. Dokkirimajin is voiced by Kaori Takaoka.
- Apparebushido (アッパレブシドー, Apparebushidō): A samurai-themed Level Number 8 Job subspecies. Apparebushido is voiced by Ryōta Ōsaka (逢坂 良太, Ōsaka Ryōta).
- Pilets (パイレッツ, Pairettsu): A pirate-themed Level Number 4 Job subspecies. Pilets is voiced by Ryōta Ōsaka.
- Deepmariner (ディープマリナー, Dīpumarinā): A submarine-themed Level Number 5 Vehicle subspecies whose Malgam form is known as Submarine Malgam (サブマリンマルガム, Sabumarin Marugamu). The Malgam form was used by a stalker named Mamoru Kariya (狩谷 守, Kariya Mamoru), only to be defeated by Valvarad. Kariya is later turned into the Submarine Malgam again by Gaelijah, only to be defeated by Kamen Rider Majade. Mamoru Kariya is portrayed by Hisashi (久獅).
- Madwheel (マッドウィール, Maddowīru): A car-themed Level Number 6 Vehicle subspecies whose Malgam form is known as Wheel Malgam (ウィールマルガム, Wīru Marugamu). The Malgam form was used by Supana, whom Glion attempted to use as a pawn for his schemes, until he came to terms with his parents' sacrifice, thus purifying Madwheel who gains the ability to transform into its race car-themed secondary form; Machwheel (マッハウィール, Mahhawīru). After Supana creates the ValvaraDriver Kurogane, Machwheel gains the ability to transform into its evolved form; Metal Machwheel (メタルマッハウィール, Metaru Mahhawīru). Madwheel/Machwheel is voiced by Taito Ban.
- Gutsshovel (ガッツショべル, Gattsushoberu): An excavator-themed Level Number 8 Vehicle subspecies. Gutsshovel is voiced by Anri Katsu (勝 杏里, Katsu Anri).
- Gekiocopter (ゲキオコプター, Gekiokoputā): An attack helicopter-themed Level Number 4 Vehicle subspecies. Gekiocopter is voiced by Taito Ban.
- Sasukemaru (サスケマル): A ninja-themed Level Number 6 Job subspecies. Sasukemaru is voiced by Kaori Takaoka.
- Energyl (エナジール, Enajīru): An energy drink-themed Level Number 4 Artifact subspecies.
- Antrooper (アントルーパー, Antorūpā): An ant colony-themed Level Number 5 Insect subspecies whose Malgam form is known as Ants Malgam (アンツマルガム, Antsu Marugamu). The Malgam form was used by Lachesis when she forcefully absorbed the Chemy prior to her defeat by Kamen Rider Gotchard. It is later turned into the Antrooper Malgam (Dark) (アントルーパーマルガム (冥黒), Antorūpā Marugamu (Meikoku)) by Gigist, only to be defeated by Kamen Rider Valvarad and reduced to a withered state until it is revived by Kamen Rider Rainbow Gotchard. Antrooper is voiced by Kaori Takaoka (高岡 香, Takaoka Kaori).
- Wrestler G (レスラーG, Resurā Jī): A professional wrestler-themed Level Number 5 Job subspecies who was found under the care of a retired masked wrestler turned wrestling coach named Kōichirō Asahi (旭 光一郎, Asahi Kōichirō) and serves as his familiar on protecting his gym from being torn down by a group of gangsters. It merges with Asahi into his prime time as Asahi G (アサヒG, Asahi Jī) to train Houtaro against Gōriki before being encouraged by its caretaker to help the young alchemist with saving the world from danger and move on without him in his fresh starting business. Wrestler G is voiced by Kenji Nomura (乃村 健次, Nomura Kenji). Kōichirō Asahi is portrayed by Masanori Machida (町田 政則, Machida Masanori), while Asahi G is portrayed by Yasuhiro Takeuchi (竹内 康博, Takeuchi Yasuhiro).
- Gengenchoucho (ゲンゲンチョウチョ, Gengenchōcho): A butterfly-themed Level Number 3 Insect subspecies. Gengenchoucho is voiced by Kaya Okuno (奥野 香耶, Okuno Kaya).
- Bulletbaang (バレットバーン, Barettobān): A gunfighter-themed Level Number 7 Job subspecies. Bulletbaang is voiced by Kaya Okuno.
- Gorillasensei (ゴリラセンセイ, Gorirasensei): A gorilla-themed Level Number 8 Animal subspecies whose Malgam form is known as Gorilla Malgam (ゴリラマルガム, Gorira Marugamu). The Malgam form was used by a disgraced former professional wrestler named Golem Gōriki (ゴーレム剛力, Gōremu Gōriki), only to be defeated by Kamen Rider Gotchard and taken by Minato into the authority's custody. Gōriki is later turned into the Gorilla Malgam again by Gaelijah, only to be defeated by Kamen Rider Platina Gotchard. Gorillasensei is voiced by Seiyū Fujiwara (藤原 聖侑, Fujiwara Seiyū). Gōriki is portrayed by Yukio Naya (納谷 幸男, Naya Yukio).
- Burningnero (バーニングネロ, Bāningunero): A habanero-themed Level Number 2 Plant subspecies. Burningnero is voiced by Kaya Okuno.
- Hawkstar (ホークスター, Hōkusutā): A hawk-themed Level Number 6 Animal subspecies whose Malgam form is known as Hawk Malgam (ホークマルガム, Hōku Marugamu). The Malgam form was used by a disgraced vengeful alchemist named Boruto Namarizaki (鉛崎 ボルト, Namarizaki Boruto), only to be defeated by the combined efforts of Kamen Rider Gotchard and Valvarad before getting expelled from the academy by Minato for his petty grudge against Supana. Hawkstar is voiced by Seiyū Fujiwara. Boruto Namarizaki is portrayed by Shogo Amo (天羽 尚吾, Amō Shōgo).
- Smaphone (スマホーン, Sumahōn): A smartphone-themed Level Number 8 Artifact subspecies. Smaphone is voiced by Katsuyuki Konishi (小西 克幸, Konishi Katsuyuki).
- Mechanichani (メカニッカニ, Mekanikkani): A crab-themed Level Number 3 Animal subspecies. Mechanichani is voiced by Katsuyuki Konishi.
- Pikahotaru (ピカホタル): A firefly-themed Level Number 2 Insect subspecies.
- Saboneedle (サボニードル, Sabonīdoru): A cactus-themed Level Number 4 Plant subspecies who was found safely by Riku Sunayama (砂山 理玖, Sunayama Riku), a friendless heir of a trading company whom it befriends, earning the nickname "Sabosuke" (サボ助). As Riku's abusive father Kenji becomes a Malgam, Riku seeks Alchemist Academy for their aid in redeeming his father and providing Saboneedle a safehaven. After Kenji learns the error of his ways toward his own son, Saboneedle gives Riku a flower as a token of their friendship before Minato erases both father and son's memories of the Chemy's existence. Saboneedle is voiced by Kana Asumi (阿澄 佳奈, Asumi Kana). Riku Sunayama is portrayed by Minato Shogaki (正垣 湊都, Shōgaki Minato).
- Greatonbo (グレイトンボ, Gureitonbo): A dragonfly-themed Level Number 6 Insect subspecies whose Malgam form is known as Dragonfly Malgam (ドラゴンフライマルガム, Doragonfurai Marugamu). The Malgam form was used by an abusive elite head of the Kousei Business trading company named Kenji Sunayama (砂山 堅二, Sunayama Kenji), only to be defeated by Kamen Rider Gotchard and ultimately apologize to his son Riku for the error of his ways towards him. Kenji Sunayama is portrayed by Seiha Naito (内藤 聖羽, Naitō Seiha).
- Ganvhale (ギャンボエール, Gyanboēru): A whale-themed Level Number 9 Animal subspecies.
- Spicle (スパイクル, Supaikuru): A bicycle-themed Level Number 1 Vehicle subspecies.
- Happyclover (ハピクローバー, Hapikurōbā): A four-leaf clover-themed Level Number 1 Plant subspecies whose Malgam form is known as Clover Malgam (クローバーマルガム, Kurōbā Marugamu). The Malgam form was used by Lachesis when she forcefully absorbed the Chemy. Happyclover is voiced by Ayasa Itō.
- Bambamboo (バンバンブー, Banbanbū): A bamboo-themed Level Number 3 Plant subspecies whose Mixtus form is a right forearm-mounted cannon. The Mixtus form was used by Lachesis when she forcefully absorbed the Chemy to evolve her Clover Malgam form into Clover Malgam Bamboo Mixtus (クローバーマルガム バンブーミクスタス, Kurōbā Marugamu Banbū Mikusutasu).
- Junglejan (ジャングルジャン, Jangurujan): A jungle-themed Level Number 9 Plant subspecies whose Malgam form is known as Jungle Malgam (ジャングルマルガム, Janguru Marugamu). The Malgam form was used by an unidentified person 10 years prior and a criminal named Kyōichi Yabuki (矢吹 恭一, Yabuki Kyōichi) in the present day, the latter being defeated by Kamen Rider Gotchard. Yabuki is later turned into the Jungle Malgam again by Gaelijah, only to be defeated by Gotcharbrothers Super Cross UFO-X. Junglejan is voiced by Ayasa Itō. Kyōichi Yabuki is portrayed by Takamitsu Fukuchi (福地 教光, Fukuchi Takamitsu).
- Renkingrobo (レンキングロボ, Renkingurobo): A mecha-themed Level Number 9 Artifact subspecies. Renkingrobo is voiced by Katsuyuki Konishi.
- Yamibat (ヤミバット, Yamibatto): A bat-themed Level Number 1 Animal subspecies. Yamibat is voiced by Shōta Hayama.
- Raidenji (ライデンジ): An alkaline battery-themed Level Number 1 Artifact subspecies whose Malgam form is known as Battery Malgam (バッテリーマルガム, Batterī Marugamu). The Malgam form was used by both a serial arsonist named Tsurugi Himeno (姫野 剣, Himeno Tsurugi) and his younger sister Hijiri Himeno (姫野 聖, Himeno Hijiri), only to be defeated by Kamen Rider Gotchard, with help from Kajiki to calm down the latter by reminding her of their shared love for the supernatural after being consumed with vengeance by her brother's betrayal, allowing the former to return to his original kind-hearted self and willingly turn himself in to the authorities for his actions. Hijiri is later used by Gaelijah. Raidenji is voiced by Shōta Hayama (葉山 翔太, Hayama Shōta). Tsurugi and Hijiri Himeno are portrayed by Ryunosuke Moriyama (守山 龍之介, Moriyama Ryūnosuke) and Ayane Kinoshita (木下 彩音, Kinoshita Ayane) respectively.
- Flayrose (フレイローズ, Fureirōzu): A rose-themed Level Number 7 Plant subspecies. Flayrose is voiced by Ayasa Itō.
- Hiikescue (ヒーケスキュー, Hīkesukyū): A fire engine-themed Level Number 3 Vehicle subspecies. Hiikescue is voiced by Shōta Hayama.
- UFO-X (ユーフォーエックス, Yūfōekkusu): A flying saucer-themed Level Number 10 Occult subspecies who was first spotted at Kyoto by Kajiki. While taken captive by the Three Dark Sisters, they attempt to extract the power hidden within UFO-X, later revealed to be the Exgotchalibur, for their DreaDriver before it manages to escape. After Sabimaru is possessed by the DreaDriver, UFO-X gives the Exgotchalibur to Houtaro so that he can wield the power of Level Number 10 Ride Chemy Cards against the Three Dark Sisters, then fully joins Alchemist Academy to rescue Sabimaru thanks to Kajiki and his obsession with UFOs. UFO-X is voiced by Sōichirō Hoshi (保志 総一朗, Hoshi Sōichirō).
- Televi (テレヴィ, Terevi): A television-themed Level Number 6 Artifact subspecies. Televi is voiced by Rikiya Tomizono, who also portrays Sabimaru.
- Bakuonzemi (バクオンゼミ): A cicada-themed Level Number 4 Insect subspecies.
- Mitemirror (ミテミラー, Mitemirā): A mirror-themed Level Number 3 Artifact subspecies. Mitemirror is voiced by Misato Fukuen.
- Stagvine (スタッグバイン, Sutaggubain): A stag beetle-themed Level Number 7 Insect subspecies. Stagvine is voiced by Ryōta Ōsaka.
- Bussasorry (ブッサソーリー, Bussasōrī): A scorpion-themed Level Number 4 Animal subspecies.
- Doctorkozo (ドクターコゾー, Dokutākozō): A physician-themed Level Number 3 Job subspecies whose Malgam form is known as Doctor Malgam (ドクターマルガム, Dokutā Marugamu). The Malgam form was used by Dupont Dōgami, only to be defeated by Lachesis.
- Tsupparihebi (ツッパリヘビー, Tsupparihebī): A snake-themed Level Number 7 Animal subspecies. Tsupparihebi is voiced by Kana Asumi.
- Bountybunny (バウンティーバニー, Bauntībanī): A rabbit-themed Level Number 5 Animal subspecies. Bountybunny is voiced by Kana Asumi.
- Panpakaparka (パンパカパーカー, Panpakapākā): A parka-themed Level Number 5 Artifact subspecies. Panpakaparka is voiced by Ryōta Ōsaka.
- Catchula (キャッチュラ, Kyatchura): A tarantula-themed Level Number 2 Animal subspecies whose Malgam form is known as Spider Malgam (スパイダーマルガム, Supaidā Marugamu). The Malgam form was used by both an unidentified man, whom Gotchard defeated, and the Three Dark Sisters' spy within the Alchemys Union named Shiori Harima (針馬 汐里, Harima Shiori), who is betrayed and killed by her own benefactors after she served her purpose. Catchula is voiced by Ryōta Ōsaka. Shiori Harima is portrayed by Ayaka Kira (吉良 彩花, Kira Ayaka).
- X-Rex (エックスレックス, Ekkusurekkusu): A Tyrannosaurus-themed Level Number 10 Ancient subspecies. X-Rex is voiced by Kenta Miyake (三宅 健太, Miyake Kenta).
- Buglesia (バグレシア, Bagureshia): A Rafflesia-themed Level Number 8 Plant subspecies whose Mixtus form is a left forearm-mounted shield. The Mixtus form was used by Lachesis when she forcefully absorbed both the Chemy and Bambamboo to evolve her Clover Malgam form into Clover Malgam Bamboo Rafflesia Mixtus (クローバーマルガム バンブーラフレシアミクスタス, Kurōbā Marugamu Banbū Rafureshia Mikusutasu) prior to her defeat by Kamen Rider Super Gotchard. The Mixtus form was used by Clotho when she forcefully absorbed the Chemy to evolve her Gorilla Malgam form into Gorilla Malgam Rafflesia Mixtus (ゴリラマルガム ラフレシアミクスタス, Gorira Marugamu Rafureshia Mikusutasu) prior to her defeat by Kamen Riders Majade and Valvarad. Buglesia is voiced by Alisa Sakamaki, who also portrays Lachesis.
- X Wizard (クロスウィザード, Kurosu Wizādo; Cross Wizard): A wizard-themed Level Number 10 Job subspecies and the secondary antagonist of the crossover film Kamen Rider the Winter Movie: Gotchard & Geats Strongest Chemy ★ Gotcha Great Operation whose Malgam form is known as Wizard Malgam (ウィザードマルガム, Wizādo Marugamu). Unlike the other Chemies, it can assume a human-sized physical form. Originally a Chemy who found enjoyment in playing with children, it was driven into loneliness due to the Alchemys Union seeing their friendship as a threat to their secrecy. Upon accepting Licht Kugimiya's offer to be his accomplice, X Wizard assists him with his plans on luring Ace Ukiyo and transforming his friends into Chemies before accepting Houtaro's offer of friendship. It was absorbed by Kugimiya into the Wizard Malgam, and later on Geats Killer, but following the latter's defeat joins Houtaro and his ensemble of Chemies, earning the nickname "Kurocchi" (クロっち, Kurotchi). X Wizard is voiced by Rie Takahashi (高橋 李依, Takahashi Rie).
- BeetlX (ビートルクス, Bītorukusu): A Japanese rhinoceros beetle-themed Level Number 10 Insect subspecies. BeetlX is voiced by KENN.
- Lixion (リクシオン, Rikushion): A lion-themed Level Number 10 Animal subspecies. Lixion is voiced by Mitsuru Miyamoto (宮本 充, Miyamoto Mitsuru).
- Exceedfighter (エクシードファイター, Ekushīdofaitā): A fighter aircraft-themed Level Number 10 Vehicle subspecies. Exceedfighter is voiced by Kōhei Amasaki.
- X Fortress (テンフォートレス, Ten Fōtoresu; Ten Fortress): A fortification-themed Level Number 10 Artifact subspecies. Despite its original small stature, X Fortress is able to conjure a giant version of itself during combat. X Fortress is voiced by Tomokazu Sugita (杉田 智和, Sugita Tomokazu).
- Xeggdrasil (ゼグドラシル, Zegudorashiru): A Yggdrasil-themed Level Number 10 Plant subspecies. Xeggdrasil is voiced by Yūko Kaida (甲斐田 裕子, Kaida Yūko).
- Utsubocchama (ウツボッチャマ, Utsubotchama): A pitcher plant-themed Level Number 6 Plant subspecies. Utsubocchama is voiced by Kaori Takaoka.
- Unicon (ユニコン, Yunikon): A unicorn-themed Level Number 3 Fantastic subspecies. After Atropos sacrifices herself to save Rinne, Unicon gains the ability to transform into its evolved form; Twilight Unicon (トワライトユニコン, Towaraito Yunikon). Unicon is voiced by Ayasa Itō.
- The Sun (ザ・サン, Za San): A sun-themed Level Number 7 Cosmic subspecies. After Atropos sacrifices herself to save Rinne, The Sun gains the ability to transform into its evolved form; Twilight The Sun (トワライトザ・サン, Towaraito Za San). In the film Kamen Rider Gotchard: The Future Daybreak, Daybreak The Sun houses the spirit of the alternate Rinne after her death. The Sun is voiced by Ryōta Ōsaka. Daybreak the Sun is voiced by Reiyo Matsumoto, who also portrays Rinne.
- Jyamatanoorochi (ジャマタノオロチ, Jamatanoorochi): A Yamata no Orochi-themed Level Number 8 Occult subspecies whose Malgam form is known as Orochi Malgam (オロチマルガム, Orochi Marugamu). The Malgam form was used by Lachesis, who was possessed by Glion at the time, when she forcefully absorbed the Chemy prior to her defeat by Kamen Rider Super Gotchard. Jyamatanoorochi is voiced by Taito Ban.
- Neminemoon (ネミネムーン, Neminemūn): A moon-themed Level Number 4 Cosmic subspecies whose Malgam form is known as Moon Malgam (ムーンマルガム, Mūn Marugamu). The Malgam form was used by a Malice Doll created by Glion, only to be defeated by Kamen Rider Fire Gotchard. Neminemoon and the Moon Malgam are voiced by Taito Ban.
- Timelord (タイムロード, Taimurōdo): A clock-themed Level Number 7 Artifact subspecies. (Daybreak) Timelord is voiced by Tōru Ōkawa (大川 透, Ōkawa Tōru).
- Yoacerberus (ヨアケルベロス, Yoakeruberosu): A Cerberus-themed Level Number 6 Fantastic subspecies whose Malgam form is known as Cerberus Malgam (ケルベロスマルガム, Keruberosu Marugamu). The Malgam form was used by a Malice Doll created by Glion, only to be defeated by Kamen Rider Majade. Yoacerberus and the Cerberus Malgam are voiced by Kazuya Ichijō. The Malice Doll's human form is portrayed by Yōhei Fujita (藤田 洋平, Fujita Yōhei).
- Angelead (エンジェリード, Enjerīdo): An angel-themed Level Number 4 Occult subspecies whose Malgam form is known as Angel Malgam (エンジェルマルガム, Enjeru Marugamu). The Malgam form was used by a Malice Doll created by Glion, only to be defeated by Kamen Rider Valvarad. Angelead and the Angel Malgam are voiced by Misato Fukuen and Anri Katsu respectively.
- Daiohni (ダイオーニ, Daiōni): An oni-themed Level Number 6 Occult subspecies. After Supana creates the ValvaraDriver Kurogane, Daiohni gains the ability to transform into its evolved form; Metal Daiohni (メタルダイオーニ, Metaru Daiōni). During the events of the V-Cinema Kamen Rider Gotchard: Graduations, Supana fuses Machwheel and Daiohni into Daiohni GT (ダイオーニGT, Daiōni Jī Tī) through his alchemy as part of forming Valvarad GT. Daiohni is voiced by Kazuya Ichijō.
- Tricera (トライケラ, Toraikera): A Triceratops-themed Level Number 8 Ancient subspecies. Tricera is voiced by Yū Shimamura (嶋村 侑, Shimamura Yū).
- Zukyumpire (ズキュンパイア, Zukyunpaia): A vampire-themed Level Number 5 Occult subspecies. Unlike the other Chemies, it has a human-like physical form. Zukyumpire is portrayed by Jyutaro Yamanaka (山中 柔太朗, Yamanaka Jūtarō).
- Sabeliger (サーベライガー, Sāberaigā): A Smilodon-themed Level Number 5 Ancient subspecies whose Malgam form is known as Saber Tiger Malgam (サーベルタイガーマルガム, Sāberu Taigā Marugamu) and whose Mixtus form is a right forearm-mounted claw. The Malgam form was used by a Malice Doll created by Glion, only to be defeated by Kamen Rider Valvarad, while the Mixtus form was used by Clotho when she forcefully absorbed the Chemy to evolve her Mantis Malgam form into Mantis Malgam Saber Tiger Mixtus (マンティスマルガム サーベルタイガーミクスタス, Mantisu Marugamu Sāberu Taigā Mikusutasu) prior to her defeat by Kamen Riders Fire Gotchard and Majade. Sabeliger and the Saber Tiger Malgam are voiced by Yū Shimamura.
- Warptera (ワープテラ, Wāputera): A Pteranodon-themed Level Number 6 Ancient subspecies whose Malgam form is known as Pteranodon Malgam (プテラノドンマルガム, Puteranodon Marugamu). The Malgam form was used by a Malice Doll created by Glion, only to be defeated by Iron Gotchard. Warptera and the Pteranodon Malgam are voiced by Reiō Tsuchida (土田 玲央, Tsuchida Reiō).
- Kesuzo (ケスゾー, Kesuzō): An eraser-themed Level Number 2 Artifact subspecies. Kesuzo is voiced by Reiō Tsuchida.
- Dragonalos (ドラゴナロス, Doragonarosu): A dragon-themed Level Number 10 Fantastic subspecies who was one of the first two Chemies created. It was absorbed by one of Glion's homunculi to become Dragon Malgam (ドラゴンマルガム, Doragon Marugamu), only to be freed when the Malgam is defeated by Kamen Rider Wind. Dragonalos and the Dragon Malgam are voiced by Shintarō Asanuma (浅沼 晋太郎, Asanuma Shintarō).
- Gaiard (ガイアード, Gaiādo): An Earth-themed Level Number 10 Cosmic subspecies who was one of the first two Chemies created. Gaiard is voiced by Katsuyuki Konishi.
- Gigabaham (ギガバハム, Gigabahamu): A Bahamut-themed Level Number 1 Fantastic subspecies.
- Kuroana (クロアナ): A black hole-themed Level Number 9 Cosmic subspecies.
- Firemars (ファイヤマルス, Faiyamarusu): A Mars-themed Level Number 5 Cosmic subspecies. Firemars is voiced by Amon Kabe, who also portrays Kajiki.
- Berosol (ベロソル, Berosoru): A kasa-obake-themed Level Number 2 Occult subspecies whose Malgam form is known as Karakasaobake Malgam (カラカサオバケマルガム, Karakasaobake Marugamu). The Malgam form was used by a land shark, only to be defeated by Kamen Rider Platina Gotchard. Berosol is voiced by Kiyotaka Taguchi (田口 清隆, Taguchi Kiyotaka). The land shark is portrayed by Takashi Nishina (仁科 貴, Nishina Takashi).
- Carery (ケアリー, Kearī): A fairy-themed Level Number 1 Occult subspecies whose Malgam form is known as Fairy Malgam (フェアリーマルガム, Fearī Marugamu). The Malgam form was used by a land shark, only to be defeated by Kamen Rider Platina Gotchard. Carery is voiced by Misato Fukuen. The land shark is portrayed by Ryudai Onikura (鬼倉 龍大, Onikura Ryūdai).
- Mercurin (マーキュリン, Mākyurin): A Mercury-themed Level Number 1 Cosmic subspecies. Mercurin is voiced by Reiyo Matsumoto, who also portrays Rinne.
- Jupitta (ジュピッタ): A Jupiter-themed Level Number 8 Cosmic subspecies. Jupitta is voiced by Yasunari Fujibayashi, who also portrays Supana.
- Kinkiravina (キンキラヴィーナ, Kinkiravīna): A Venus-themed Level Number 2 Cosmic subspecies. Kinkiravina is voiced by Oto Abe, who also portrays Renge.
- Grandsaturn (グランドサターン, Gurandosatān): A Saturn-themed Level Number 6 Cosmic subspecies. Grandsaturn is voiced by Takaya Aoyagi (青柳 尊哉, Aoyagi Takaya), who also portrays Starshine Hoshino (スターシャイン星野, Sutāshain Hoshino) in the series.
- Ninetail (ナインテイル, Nainteiru): A nine-tailed fox-themed Level Number 9 Occult subspecies whose Malgam form is known as Kyubi Malgam (キュウビマルガム, Kyūbi Marugamu). The Malgam form was used by a kitsune, only to be defeated by Kamen Rider Platina Gotchard. Ninetail is voiced by Takaya Aoyagi.
- Inphoenix (インフェニックス, Infenikkusu): A phoenix-themed Level Number 5 Fantastic subspecies. Inphoenix is voiced by Rie Takahashi.
- Mackraken (マックラーケン, Makkurāken): A kraken-themed Level Number 7 Occult subspecies whose Malgam form is known as Kraken Malgam (クラーケンマルガム, Kurāken Marugamu). The Malgam form was used by multiple Malice Dolls created by Glion, only to be defeated by Kamen Riders Platina Gotchard and Majade. Mackraken and the Kraken Malgam are voiced by Tsubasa Yonaga (代永 翼, Yonaga Tsubasa).
- Blizzammoth (ブリザンモス, Burizanmosu): A mammoth-themed Level Number 9 Ancient subspecies whose Malgam form is known as Mammoth Malgam (マンモスマルガム, Manmosu Marugamu). The Malgam form was used by four Malice Dolls created by Glion, only to be defeated by Kamen Riders Platina Gotchard and Majade. Blizzammoth and the Mammoth Malgam are voiced by Seiichiro Yamashita (山下 誠一郎, Yamashita Seiichirō).
- Gigalodon (ギガロドン, Gigarodon): A megalodon-themed Level Number 7 Ancient subspecies.
- Nammonite (ナンモナイト, Nanmonaito): An ammonite-themed Level Number 1 Ancient subspecies. Nammonite is voiced by Seiichiro Yamashita.
- Akumanocaris (アクマノカリス, Akumanokarisu): An Anomalocaris-themed Level Number 2 Ancient subspecies whose Malgam form is known as Anomalocaris Malgam (アノマロカリスマルガム, Anomarokarisu Marugamu). The Malgam form was used by a criminal, only to be defeated by Kamen Rider Gotchard. The criminal is later turned into the Anomalocaris Malgam again by Gaelijah, only to be defeated by Kamen Rider Rainbow Gotchard. Akumanocaris is voiced by Tōru Ōkawa. The criminal is portrayed by Hiroyuki Muraoka (村岡 弘之, Muraoka Hiroyuki).
- Karyudos (カリュードス, Karyūdosu): A hunter-themed Level Number 9 Job subspecies.
- Kaiserbee (カイザービー, Kaizābī): A bee-themed Level Number 8 Insect subspecies.
- Sayzombie (セイゾンビ, Seizonbi): A zombie-themed Level Number 3 Occult subspecies. Sayzombie is voiced by Rikuto Kumaki, who also portrays Minato.
- Gokigenmeteon (ゴキゲンメテオン): A meteor-themed Level Number 3 Cosmic subspecies. Gokigenmeteon is voiced by Hisanori Koyatsu (小谷津 央典, Koyatsu Hisanori).
- Macentaurus (マケンタウロス, Makentaurosu): A centaur-themed Level Number 2 Fantastic subspecies. It along with Vanfenrir, Haodin, Gingriffon, and Donposeidon is turned into the Fantastic Malgam 5 Type Mixtus (Dark) (ファンタスティックマルガム 5タイプミクスタス (冥黒), Fantasutikku Marugamu Faibu Taipu Mikusutasu (Meikoku)) by Gigist, only to be defeated by Kamen Rider Rainbow Gotchard. Macentaurus is voiced by Yuki Kodaira.
- Vanfenrir (ヴァンフェンリル, Vanfenriru): A Fenrir-themed Level Number 4 Fantastic subspecies. Vanfenrir is voiced by Kanon Miyahara, who also portrays Clotho.
- Haodin (ハオーディン, Haōdin): An Odin-themed Level Number 7 Fantastic subspecies. Haodin is voiced by Shinpachi Tsuji (辻 親八, Tsuji Shinpachi).
- Gingriffon (ギングリフォン, Gingurifon): A griffin-themed Level Number 8 Fantastic subspecies. Gingriffon is voiced by Ryōta Ōsaka.
- Donposeidon (ドンポセイドン): A Poseidon-themed Level Number 9 Fantastic subspecies. Donposeidon is voiced by Ryōtarō Okiayu, who also voices Gigist and the DreaDriver.
- Pakuraptor (パクラプター, Pakuraputā): A Velociraptor-themed Level Number 3 Ancient subspecies. Pakuraptor is voiced by Kaori Takaoka.
- Ojilacanth (オジーラカンス, Ojīrakansu): A coelacanth-themed Level Number 4 Ancient subspecies. Ojilacanth is voiced by Shinpachi Tsuji.

==== Nijigon ====
Nijigon (ニジゴン) is a kaiju-themed Level Number EX Rainbow subspecies who originally was hidden by Fuga inside the GotcharDriver, having silently watched Houtaro fighting as Gotchard and even sometimes helping him in secret. It first appears encased in an egg, nicknamed "Tamagon" (タマゴン), finally hatching when Houtaro convinces it to fight by his side and see the world together.

Utilizing its Rainbow Breath (レインボーブレス, Reinbō Buresu) ability, Nijigon can heal and temporarily evolve other Chemies into a Rainbow Chemy (レインボーケミー, Reinbō Kemī), which renders them immune to malice. Unlike the other Chemies, it has two Ride Chemy Cards; an Extra (エクストラ, Ekusutora) version based on itself and a Special (スペシャル, Supesharu) version based on its Rainbow Breath.

Nijigon is voiced by Nobuhiko Okamoto (岡本 信彦, Okamoto Nobuhiko).

==== Kamedoon ====
Kamedoon (カメドーン, Kamedōn) is a turtle/tank-themed Level Number 0 subspecies who was the 102nd Chemy created by Sabimaru and his older brother, Kenichi Tsuruhara (鶴原 鍵一, Tsuruhara Ken'ichi), a chief researcher of Kongo Laboratory (金剛ラボラトリー, Kongō Raboratorī). The Malgam form known as Kamedoon Malgam (カメドーンマルガム, Kamedōn Marugamu) was used by both the director of Kongo Laboratory named Mami Kongo (金剛 真実, Kongō Mami) and Kenichi, only to be defeated by Kamen Rider Rainbow Gotchard.

Kamedoon is voiced by Kotarō Kawada, who also portrays young Sabimaru. Mami Kongo and Kenichi Tsuruhara are portrayed by Hinako Saeki (佐伯 日菜子, Saeki Hinako) and Yoshihiro Nakayama (中山 義紘, Nakayama Yoshihiro) respectively. As a teenager, Kenichi is portrayed by Akito Nakamura (中村 朗仁, Nakamura Akito).

==== El Dragon ====
El Dragon (エルドラゴン, Eru Doragon) is a Level Number EX Dark Ether subspecies and copy of Nijigon created by Glion to replace Nijigon as the final piece of the Philosopher's Stone that allows him to control the power of the Dark Kings.

Similarly to Nijigon, El Dragon can utilize its Golden Breath (ゴールデンブレス, Gōruden Buresu) ability to transform humans and/or objects into gold.

==== Replichemies ====
- Repli Steamliner (レプリスチームライナー, Repuri Suchīmurainā): A dark copy of Steamliner that grants superhuman agility. Repli Steamliner is voiced by Nobuyuki Hiyama, who also voices Steamliner.
- Repli Pikahotaru (レプリピカホタル, Repuri Pikahotaru): A dark copy of Pikahotaru that grants photokinesis.
- Repli Bulletbaang (レプリバレットバーン, Repuri Barettobān): A dark copy of Bulletbang that grants the use of the twin Bloody BB (ブラッディーBB, Buraddī Bī Bī) handguns.
- Repli Odorippa (レプリオドリッパ, Repuri Odorippa): A dark copy of Odorippa that grants proficiency in capoeira.
- Repli Skebows (レプリスケボーズ, Repuri Sukebōzu): A dark copy of Skebows that grants superhuman speed.
- Repli Apparebushido (レプリアッパレブシドー, Repuri Apparebushidō): A dark copy of Apparebushido that grants the use of the Bloody AB (ブラッディーAB, Buraddī Ē Bī) katana.
- Repli Wrestler G (レプリレスラーG, Repuri Resurā Jī): A dark copy of Wrestler G that grants superhuman strength.
- Repli Venomdake (レプリヴェノムダケ, Repuri Venomudake): A dark copy of Venomdake that grants toxikinesis.
- Repli Gorillasensei (レプリゴリラセンセイ, Repuri Gorirasensei): A dark copy of Gorillasensei that grants geokinesis.
- Repli Gekiocopter (レプリゲキオコプター, Repuri Gekiokoputā): A dark copy of Gekiocopter that grants the ability to fire energy missiles.
- Repli Flayrose (レプリフレイローズ, Repuri Fureirōzu): A dark copy of Flayrose that grants the ability to generate explosive rose petals.
- Repli Kamantis (レプリカマンティス, Repuri Kamantisu): A dark copy of Kamantis that grants the ability to generate energy blades. A replica of the Mantis Malgam form was used by a Malice Doll (悪意人形, Akui Ningyō) created by Glion, only to be defeated by Kamen Rider Majade.
- Repli Catchula (レプリキャッチュラ, Repuri Kyatchura): A dark copy of Catchula that grants the ability to generate spider silk.
- Repli Antrooper (レプリアントルーパー, Repuri Antorūpā): A dark copy of Antrooper that grants self-duplication capabilities. In The Future Daybreak, Repli Antroopers were used en masse to maintain Dreatrooper's transformation.
- Repli Madwheel (レプリマッドウィール, Repuri Maddowīru): A dark copy of Madwheel that grants the ability to generate a spiked energy wheel.
- Repli Unicon (レプリユニコン, Repuri Yunikon): A dark copy of Unicon that grants the use of the Bloody UC (ブラッディーUC, Buraddī Yū Shī) rapier. Repli Unicon is voiced by Ayasa Itō, who also voices Unicon.
- Repli Daiohni (レプリダイオーニ, Repuri Daiōni): A dark copy of Daiohni that grants the use of the Bloody DO (ブラッディーDO, Buraddī Dī Ō) kanabō.
- Repli Raidenji (レプリライデンジ, Repuri Raidenji): A dark copy of Raidenji. A replica of the Battery Malgam form was used by a Malice Doll created by Glion, only to be defeated by Kamen Rider Valvarad.
- Repli Beetlx (レプリビートルクス, Repuri Bītorukusu): A dark copy of Beetlx.
- Repli X Wizard (レプリクロスウィザード, Repuri Kurosu Wizādo): A dark copy of X Wizard.
- Repli Lixion (レプリリクシオン, Repuri Rikushion): A dark copy of Lixion.
- Repli Exceedfighter (レプリエクシードファイター, Repuri Ekushīdofaitā): A dark copy of Exceedfighter.
- Repli X-Rex (レプリエックスレックス, Repuri Ekkusurekkusu): A dark copy of X-Rex.
- Repli UFO-X (レプリユーフォーエックス, Repuri Yūfōekkusu): A dark copy of UFO-X.
- Repli X Fortress (レプリテンフォートレス, Repuri Ten Fōtoresu; Repli Ten Fortress): A dark copy of X Fortress.
- Repli Xeggdrasil (レプリゼクドラシル, Repuri Zekudorashiru): A dark copy of Xeggdrasil.
- Repli Gaiard (レプリガイアード, Repuri Gaiādo): A dark copy of Gaiard.
- Repli Dragonalos (レプリドラゴナロス, Repuri Doragonarosu): A dark copy of Dragonalos. In The Future Daybreak, it was used by Alzard to transform into a replica of the Dragon Malgam.
- Repli Gigantliner (レプリギガントライナー, Repuri Gigantorainā): A dark copy of Gigantliner that appears exclusively in the stage show Kamen Rider Gotchard: Final Stage.

==== Legend Chemies ====
- Geats Chemy (ギーツケミー, Gītsu Kemī): A kitsune-themed Level Number 5 Legend Rider subspecies who appears exclusively in the crossover film Kamen Rider the Winter Movie: Gotchard & Geats Strongest Chemy ★ Gotcha Great Operation. Its true identity is Ace Ukiyo's late pet dog Constantine (コンスタンティン, Konsutantin), nicknamed "Con" (コン, Kon), who died in a car accident during his time as a high school student where its spirit lingered around Ace and manifested as a Chemy to protect him from X Wizard's spell. After the fight with Geats Killer, it disappears once Ace finally recognized the Chemy as his deceased pet. The Geats Chemy is voiced by VTuber Shirakami Fubuki (白上 フブキ) of Hololive Production.
- Tycoon Chemy (タイクーンケミー, Taikūn Kemī): A tanuki-themed Level Number 2 Legend Rider subspecies who appears exclusively in the crossover film Kamen Rider the Winter Movie: Gotchard & Geats Strongest Chemy ★ Gotcha Great Operation as the transformed state of Keiwa Sakurai via X Wizard's spell. The Tycoon Chemy is voiced by Ryuga Sato (佐藤 瑠雅, Satō Ryūga), who also portrays Keiwa.
- Na-Go Chemy (ナーゴケミー, Nāgo Kemī): A black cat-themed Level Number 3 Legend Rider subspecies who appears exclusively in the crossover film Kamen Rider the Winter Movie: Gotchard & Geats Strongest Chemy ★ Gotcha Great Operation as the transformed state of Neon Kurama via X Wizard's spell. The Na-Go Chemy is voiced by Yuna Hoshino (星乃 夢奈, Hoshino Yuna), who also portrays Neon.
- Buffa Chemy (バッファケミー, Baffa Kemī): A water buffalo-themed Level Number 6 Legend Rider subspecies who appears exclusively in the crossover film Kamen Rider the Winter Movie: Gotchard & Geats Strongest Chemy ★ Gotcha Great Operation as the transformed state of Michinaga Azuma via X Wizard's spell. The Buffa Chemy is voiced by Kazuto Mokudai (杢代 和人, Mokudai Kazuto), who also portrays Michinaga.

== Guest characters ==
- Licht Kugimiya (釘宮 リヒト, Kugimiya Rihito): An inspector from the Alchemys Union and the main antagonist of the crossover film Kamen Rider the Winter Movie: Gotchard & Geats Strongest Chemy ★ Gotcha Great Operation. In reality, he is an ancient man whom Ace Ukiyo defeated in a previous DGP 2000 years ago. Following his humiliating defeat, he studied alchemy to achieve immortality and prepare for his revenge. When Fuga found out the conspiracies within the Alchemys Union, before immediately setting the Chemies free a decade later, Kugimiya found and used X Wizard as a pawn for his scheme. He is ultimately defeated by Kamen Riders Star Gotchard and Geats IX, after which he is taken by Minato into the authority's custody. Kugimiya's initial form is fusing with X Wizard into the Wizard Malgam. After absorbing the Geats Chemy, he assumes a Kamen Rider Geats IX-esque monster form known as Geats Killer (ギーツキラー, Gītsu Kirā). (Note: Tentatively drafted as Another Geats (アナザーギーツ, Anazā Gītsu) during the pre-release film production.) Licht Kugimiya is portrayed by Yasukaze Motomiya (本宮 泰風, Motomiya Yasukaze).
- Butler (バトラー, Batorā): Kaguya's personal butler from an alternate universe who first appeared in the web special Kamen Rider Gotchard vs. Kamen Rider Legend. Butler is portrayed by Amon Kabe, who also portrays Ryo Kajiki.
- Hundred (ハンドレッド, Handoreddo): An evil organization from an alternate universe who first appeared in the web special Kamen Rider Gotchard vs. Kamen Rider Legend. To combat Kamen Rider Legend, the organization utilize copies of past Rider powers they manufactured through their advanced technology.
  - Alpha (アルファ, Arufa): An advance force commander of Hundred from an alternate universe. He is defeated by Kamen Riders Platina Gotchard and Dread (Clotho). Alpha is portrayed by Yu Miyazawa (宮澤 佑, Miyazawa Yū).
  - Saigetsu (サイゲツ): The general of the elite four of Hundred from an alternate universe who transforms into Kamen Riders Dark Kiva, Ark-Zero, and Ark-One. After being killed by the Hundred Superiors for his failures, he is resurrected by Gigist and merges with Nammonite, Gigalodon, Sayzombie, and Gokigenmeteon to become the Ark-One Malgam 4 Type Mixtus (アークワンマルガム 4タイプミクスタス, Āku Wan Marugamu Fō Taipu Mikusutasu), only to be defeated by Kamen Riders Platina Gotchard and Legendary Legend. Saigetsu is portrayed by Katsuya Takagi (高木 勝也, Takagi Katsuya).
  - Mimei (ミメイ): One of the elite four of Hundred from an alternate universe who transforms into Kamen Rider Glare. She is defeated by Zein. Mimei is portrayed by Fumi Taniguchi (谷口 布実, Taniguchi Fumi).
  - Tasogare (タソガレ): One of the elite four of Hundred from an alternate universe who transforms into Kamen Rider Eternal. He is defeated by Kamen Rider Platina Gotchard. Tasogare is portrayed by Ryuma Hashido (橋渡 竜馬, Hashido Ryūma).
  - Hundred Superiors (ハンドレッド上層部, Handoreddo Jōsōbu): The three mysterious leaders of Hundred. The Hundred Superiors are voiced by Taisuke Nakano (中野 泰佑, Nakano Taisuke), Rei Igarashi (五十嵐 麗, Igarashi Rei), and Hisanori Koyatsu.
- Zein (ゼイン): An artificial intelligence from the web series Kamen Rider Outsiders who can transform into Kamen Rider Zein (仮面ライダーゼイン, Kamen Raidā Zein). Tōru Ōkawa reprises his voice role from Kamen Rider Outsiders.
- Shoma (ショウマ, Shōma): A human-Granute hybrid who can transform into Kamen Rider Gavv (仮面ライダーガヴ, Kamen Raidā Gavu). When Houtaro and Kaguya visit his world, Shoma presents them with two packs of gummy candies in return for being presented with the Kuuga Gochizo by the latter before departing to fight Granutes. Shoma is portrayed by Hidekazu Chinen (知念 英和, Chinen Hidekazu), ahead of his appearance in Kamen Rider Gavv.

== Spin-off characters ==
=== Gengetsu ===
Gengetsu (ゲンゲツ) is one of the elite four of Hundred from an alternate universe who appears exclusively in the web special Kamen Rider Gotchard vs. Kamen Rider Legend. Initially ordering his army of Kasshine against Kaguya, Gengetsu transforms into Kamen Rider Barlckxs to personally battle Gotchard and Legend until he was defeated by them, swearing that his general would avenge him in the future.

Gengetsu is portrayed by Robin Furuya (古屋 呂敏, Furuya Robin), who previously portrayed Storious in Kamen Rider Saber.

=== Tetsuo Tajima ===
Tetsuo Tajima (但馬 鉄男, Tajima Tetsuo) is an alchemist in an alternative future timeline who appears exclusively in the film Kamen Rider Gotchard: The Future Daybreak.

Tetsuo Tajima is portrayed by Yoshio Kojima (小島 よしお, Kojima Yoshio).

=== Ichika Sakaki ===
Ichika Sakaki (榊 一香, Sakaki Ichika) is a girl in a refugee camp in an alternative future timeline who appears exclusively in the film Kamen Rider Gotchard: The Future Daybreak.

Ichika Sakaki is portrayed by Ayane Tarumizu (垂水 文音, Tarumizu Ayane).

=== Dark Death Masks ===
The Dark Death Masks (冥黒のデスマスク, Meikoku no Desu Masuku) are a trio of Glion's minions in an alternative future timeline who appear exclusively in the film Kamen Rider Gotchard: The Future Daybreak.

==== Hellcrate ====
Hellcrate (ヘルクレイト, Herukureito) is a doppelganger of Supana who wears a red mask and can transform into the Angel Malgam. He is defeated by Kamen Rider Valvarad.

Hellcrate is portrayed by Yasunari Fujibayashi, who also portrays Supana.

==== Lachineires ====
Lachineires (ラキネイレス, Rakineiresu) is a doppelganger of Lachesis who wears a white mask and can transform into the Orochi Malgam. She is defeated by Kamen Rider Fire Gotchard.

Lachineires is portrayed by Alisa Sakamaki, who also portrays Lachesis.

==== Alzard ====
Alzard (アルザード, Aruzādo) is a doppelganger of Minato who wears a blue mask and can transform into the Dragon Malgam. He is defeated by Kamen Rider Majade.

Alzard is portrayed by Rikuto Kumaki, who also portrays Minato.

=== Dark King ===
The Dark King is an entity who was sealed behind the Door of Darkness and appears exclusively in the film Kamen Rider Gotchard: The Future Daybreak. Absorbed by Glion, the Dark King manipulates him into invading the world until Glion's defeat. Following his defeat by Kamen Riders Miracle Gotchard, Majade, and Gotchard Shining Daybreak, the Dark King runs away to the past, only to be destroyed permanently by the latter.

The Dark King is voiced by Katsuyuki Konishi.

=== Ouroboros ===
Ouroboros (ウロボロス, Uroborosu) is an entity from the Ouroboros World who appears exclusively in the V-Cinema Kamen Rider Gotchard: Graduations. Although Houtaro and his friends seal Ouroboros and the Door of Darkness in the realm behind the door, Ouroboros drags Supana into the realm. Ouroboros is defeated for good by Supana before the latter escapes from the realm.

Ouroboros is voiced by Tomokazu Sugita.

=== Risa Arisugawa ===
Risa Arisugawa (有栖川 リサ, Arisugawa Risa) is an aspiring singer who is Lachesis' human model and appears exclusively in the web special Dark Apocalypse: Lachesis.

Risa Arisugawa is portrayed by Alisa Sakamaki, who also portrays Lachesis.

=== Dupont Dōgami ===
Dupont Dōgami (銅神 デュポン, Dōgami Dupon) is a music producer and alchemist who creates enhanced humans known as Berserkers (バーサーカー, Bāsākā) and appears exclusively in the web special Dark Apocalypse: Lachesis. He is killed by Lachesis.

Dupont Dōgami is portrayed by Tatsuomi Hamada (濱田 龍臣, Hamada Tatsuomi).

=== Nayuta Mikazuki ===
Nayuta Mikazuki (三日月 ナユタ, Mikazuki Nayuta) is a fellow student of Rinne's at the University of West London who appears exclusively in the crossover web specials Kamen Rider Majade with Girls Remix, Girls Remix in Halloween Party, and Kamen Rider Eins with Girls Remix. A modified human of Crowd, she joins Girls Remix after being rescued from the organization by the team. After her defeat of Sumire Kurono, she goes on a training journey to become a full-fledged Kamen Rider.

Utilizing the Wirberwind (ヴィルベルヴィント, Viruberuvinto) belt, Nayuta can transform into Kamen Rider Eins (仮面ライダーアインズ, Kamen Raidā Ainzu).

Nayuta Mikazuki is portrayed by Amane Tensho (天翔 天音, Tenshō Amane).

=== Sumire Kurono ===
Sumire Kurono (黒野 すみれ, Kurono Sumire) is the leader of the criminal organization Crowd (クラウド, Kuraudo) who creates modified humans and appears exclusively in the crossover web specials Kamen Rider Majade with Girls Remix, Girls Remix in Halloween Party, and Kamen Rider Eins with Girls Remix. Her true identity is a former Hundred member named Chronos (クロノス, Kuronosu) who left the organization to create new Kamen Riders. She is defeated by Eins.

Utilizing a Card Deck (カードデッキ, Kādo Dekki) in conjunction with the V-Buckle (Ｖバックル, V Bakkuru) belt, Sumire can transform into Kamen Rider Fatale (仮面ライダーファタル, Kamen Raidā Fataru).

Sumire Kurono is portrayed by Arisa Komiya (小宮 有紗, Komiya Arisa).

=== Carla and Anga ===
Carla (カーラ, Kāra) and Anga (アンガ) are modified humans of Crowd who transform into Kamen Rider Mage and Ride-Players respectively and appear exclusively in the crossover web special Kamen Rider Eins with Girls Remix. They are defeated by Aguilera and Sabela respectively.

Carla and Anga are portrayed by Haruna Enomoto (榎本 遥菜, Enomoto Haruna) and Konomi Naito (内藤 好美, Naitō Konomi) respectively.
