= Bakul (disambiguation) =

Bakul is a 1954 Indian film.

Bakul may also refer to:

== People ==
- Bakul Harshadrai Dholakia (born 1947), former Director of Indian Institute
- Bakul Kayastha (born c. 1400), mathematician from Kamrup
- Bakul Tripathi (1928–2006), Gujarati essayist
- Kabir Bakul (born 1966), Bangladeshi lyricist and journalist
- Shahidul Islam Bakul, Bangladeshi politician
- Rafiqul Islam Bakul, Bangladeshi politician

== Places ==
- Hasan Bakul, Iran
- Oum Bakul, Sudan

== Films ==
- Bakul Priya, 1997 Bengali drama film

== See also ==
- Baku (disambiguation)
