= List of Kamen Rider Gavv characters =

The main characters of Kamen Rider Gavv. From left to right: Sachika Amane, Shoma, and Hanto Karakida.

Kamen Rider Gavv (仮面ライダーガヴ, Kamen Raidā Gavu) is a Japanese tokusatsu series that is the 35th installment in the Kamen Rider franchise and the sixth entry in the Reiwa era.

== Main characters ==
=== Shoma ===
Shoma (ショウマ, Shōma) is a human-Granute hybrid and former member of the Stomach family who turned against them after they killed his human mother Michiru, alongside Hanto's mother Sae, when he discovered the truth behind his family's conspiracy. Upon arriving in the human world, he renames himself Shoma Inoue (井上 生真, Inoue Shōma) to honor the memory of his mother and vows to protect humanity from his former family and the Granutes who worked for them. Over the course of the series, he finds the only two family members who support him; his paternal granduncle Dente and his maternal uncle Masaru. Three months after the deaths of his siblings and Bocca Jaldak, Shoma starts developing Light Treats (光菓子, Hikarigashi) to cure stranded former part-time Stomach employees from the Dark Treats' addictions, making said confection edible to both humans and Granutes alike without any side effects.

Utilizing the Poppingummy Gochizo in conjunction with his modified belt-like Gavv, (Note: In some media and merchandise, the name "Henshin Belt Gavv" (変身ベルトガヴ, Henshin Beruto Gavu; Transformation Belt Gavv) is used for the belt to avoid confusion.) also known as the "Red Gavv" (赤ガヴ, Aka Gavu), attached to his abdomen, Shoma can transform into Kamen Rider Gavv Poppingummy Form (ポッピングミフォーム, Poppingumi Fōmu). While transformed, he is clad in viscoelastic regenerative armor. He also wields the Gavvgablade (ガヴガブレイド, Gavugabureido) sword, which allows him to perform feint attacks by firing Gochizo loaded in the vehicle-like Gochispeeder (ゴチスピーダー, Gochisupīdā) projectile. His personal vehicle is the Vrocan Buggy (ブルキャンバギー, Burukyan Bagī) ATV, which is summoned from the Vrocan Gochizo and can be reconfigured into either an alternate motorcycle mode or the double-barreled Vrocan Gatling (ブルキャンガトリング, Burukyan Gatoringu) cannon. Additionally, he can assume a variety of forms and/or their enhanced Assist (アシスト, Ashisuto) versions using other Gochizo, which are as follows:

- Kickingummy Assist (キッキングミアシスト, Kikkingumi Ashisuto): An enhanced version of Poppingummy Form accessed from the Kickingummy Gochizo that equips Shoma with the Range Kicking (レンジキッキング, Renji Kikkingu) sabaton.
- Zakuzakuchips Form (ザクザクチップスフォーム, Zakuzakuchippusu Fōmu): An auxiliary form accessed from the Zakuzakuchips Gochizo that grants proficiency in sword fighting. In this form, Shoma dual wields the twin regenerative ZakuzakuchipSlasher (ザクザクチップスラッシャー, Zakuzakuchippusurasshā) scimitars.
  - Hirihirichips Assist (ヒリヒリチップスアシスト, Hirihirichippusu Ashisuto): An enhanced version of Zakuzakuchips Form accessed from the Hirihirichips Gochizo that grants pyrokinesis.
- Punchingummy Assist (パンチングミアシスト, Panchingumi Ashisuto): An enhanced version of Poppingummy Form accessed from the Punchingummy Gochizo that equips Shoma with the Shuwa Punching (シュワパンチング, Shuwa Panchingu) gauntlet. This form first appears in the film Kamen Rider Gotchard: The Future Daybreak.
- Fuwamallow Form (ふわマロフォーム, Fuwamaro Fōmu): An auxiliary form accessed from the Fuwamallow Gochizo that grants bouncing capabilities. However, the mitten-like hands make it difficult for Shoma to grab objects and the armor will melt if subjected to high heat.
  - Marumallow Assist (まるマロアシスト, Marumaro Ashisuto): An enhanced version of Fuwamallow Form accessed from the Marumallow Gochizo that grants shapeshifting capabilities.
- Chocodan Form (チョコダンフォーム, Chokodan Fōmu): An auxiliary form accessed from the Chocodan Gochizo that grants proficiency in sharpshooting. In this form, Shoma wields the Chocodan Gun (チョコダンガン, Chokodan Gan). However, the armor will melt if exposed to high temperatures.
  - Chocodon Assist (チョコドンアシスト, Chokodon Ashisuto): An enhanced version of Chocodan Form accessed from the Chocodon Gochizo that grants the use of the Chocodon Gun (チョコドンガン, Chokodon Gan) to dual wield alongside the Chocodan Gun.
- Gurucan Form (グルキャンフォーム, Gurukyan Fōmu): An auxiliary form accessed from the Gurucan Gochizo that clads Shoma in a heatproof exosuit. In this form, he wields the Vrocan Gatling.
  - Bakucan Assist (バクキャンアシスト, Bakukyan Ashisuto): An enhanced version of Gurucan Form accessed from the Bakucan Gochizo that equips Shoma with the twin shoulder-mounted Rock Bakucannons (ロックバクキャノン, Rokku Bakukyanon).
- Bushel Form (ブシュエルフォーム, Bushueru Fōmu): An auxiliary form accessed from the Bushel Gochizo that grants chlorokinesis. In this form, Shoma wields the Xmax (クリスマックス, Kurisumakkusu) battle axe.
- Kickingummy & Punchingummy Assist (キッキングミ&パンチングミアシスト, Kikkingumi Ando Panchingumi Ashisuto): An enhanced version of Poppingummy Form accessed from the Kickingummy and Punchingummy Gochizo that equips Shoma with the Range Kicking and Shuwa Punching.
- Caking Form (ケーキングフォーム, Kēkingu Fōmu): An upgrade form accessed from the Caking Gochizo that grants photokinesis. In this form, Shoma wields the pastry bag-like Gavvwhipir (ガヴホイッピア, Gavuhoippia) lance, which allows him to summon a pair of humanoid Whipped Soldier (ホイップ兵, Hoippu-hei) servants each wielding a Whipped Rod (ホイップロッド, Hoippu Roddo) spear for combat assistance. He can also augment the Whipped Soldiers with the abilities and/or weaponry of his preexisting forms via their corresponding Gochizo. However, prolonged use of this form will consume Shoma's energy, causing him to starve once he cancels his transformation.
- Blizzardsorbet Form (ブリザードソルベフォーム, Burizādosorube Fōmu): Shoma's super form accessed from the Blizzardsorbei Gochizo that grants cryokinesis and the use of varying Atari (アタリ) abilities. In this form, he can wield the Gavvwhipir if the Blizzardsorbei Gochizo was created by consuming ice cream cake, allowing him to summon a pair of enhanced Ice Whipped Soldiers (アイスホイップ兵, Aisu Hoippu-hei) for combat assistance. However, Shoma can only use this form for a certain amount of time before the Blizzardsorbei Gochizo melts and forcefully cancels his transformation.
- Amazingummy Form (アメイジングミフォーム, Ameijingumi Fōmu): An evolution of Poppingummy Form accessed from the Amazingummy Gochizo that grants thermokinesis.
- Shield Snack Form (シールドスナックフォーム, Shīrudo Sunakku Fōmu): A special form accessed from the Kungfu Ramen Gochizo that grants proficiency in Chinese martial arts. In this form, Shoma is equipped with a buckler. This form appears exclusively in the Hyper Battle DVD special Kamen Rider Gavv: Gourmet Snacks and Woo!-mai Wakamen!!.
  - Choco T Assist (チョコTアシスト, Choko Tī Ashisuto): An enhanced version of Shield Snack Form accessed from the Choco Treasure Gochizo that grants the ability to morph Shoma's buckler into a nunchaku. This form appears exclusively in the Hyper Battle DVD special Kamen Rider Gavv: Gourmet Snacks and Woo!-mai Wakamen!!.
- Partea Scone Form (パーTEAスコーンフォーム, Pātī Sukōn Fōmu): A special form accessed from the Partea Scone Gochizo. This form appears exclusively in the stage show Kamen Rider Gavv: Strange Sweets Tea Party.
- Hexenheim (ヘクセンハイム, Hekusenhaimu): A special form accessed from the eponymous Gochizo that grants the combined powers of Shoma's preexisting Gochizo. In this form, he wields the serrated Hexen Blade (ヘクセンブレイド, Hekusen Bureido) sword. This form appears exclusively in the film Kamen Rider Gavv: Invaders of the House of Snacks.
- Kin Choco Form (金チョコフォーム, Kin Choko Fōmu): A special form accessed from the Kin Choco Gochizo. In this form, Shoma dual wields a pair of handguns that resemble the Chocodan Gun. This form appears exclusively in the Ishikawa Prefecture version of the stage show Kamen Rider Gavv: Final Stage.
- Tako Sen Form (たこせんフォーム, Tako Sen Fōmu): A special form accessed from the Tako Sen Gochizo that grants a pair of cephalopod limbs. This form appears exclusively in the Osaka Prefecture version of the stage show Kamen Rider Gavv: Final Stage.
- Men Sen Form (メンセンフォーム, Men Sen Fōmu): A special form accessed from the Men Sen Gochizo. In this form, Shoma wields a kanabō. This form appears exclusively in the Fukuoka Prefecture version of the stage show Kamen Rider Gavv: Final Stage.
- Uirou Form (ういろうフォーム, Uirō Fōmu): A special form accessed from the Uirou Gochizo. In this form, Shoma dual wields a pair of tonfa. This form appears exclusively in the Aichi Prefecture version of the stage show Kamen Rider Gavv: Final Stage.
- Ningyo Form (ニンギョーフォーム, Ningyō Fōmu): A special form accessed from the Ningyo Gochizo. In this form, Shoma wields a katana. This form appears exclusively in the Tokyo version of the stage show Kamen Rider Gavv: Final Stage.

Later in the series, Shoma acquires the jar-like Gochipod (ゴチポッド, Gochipoddo) device, which allows him to assume one of his two final forms. However, it can only function by absorbing 100 Gochizo and must be refilled after each use.

- Over Mode (オーバーモード, Ōbā Mōdo): Shoma's orange-colored final form accessed from the Gochipod's Over Energy (オーバーエナジー, Ōbā Enajī) mode that increases his physical strength to its fullest potential at the cost of running speed and clads him in elasticized armor. In this form, he is equipped with a pair of Punching Over (パンチングオーバー, Panchingu Ōbā) gauntlets.
- Master Mode (マスターモード, Masutā Mōdo): Shoma's purple-colored final form accessed from the Gochipod's Master Taste (マスターテイスト, Masutā Teisuto) mode that increases his running speed to its fullest potential at the cost of physical strength and grants the ability to summon any of his preexisting forms' weapons. In this form, he is equipped with a pair of Kicking Master (キッキングマスター, Kikkingu Masutā) sabatons.

Shoma is portrayed by Hidekazu Chinen (知念 英和, Chinen Hidekazu). As a child, Shoma is portrayed by Haru Takagi (高木 波瑠, Takagi Haru).

=== Hanto Karakida ===
Hanto Karakida (辛木田 絆斗, Karakida Hanto) is a freelance writer investigating Shoma and the Granutes. He was orphaned at a young age, having lost his mother Sae to the hands of Stomach Inc. when he and Shoma were children, and his grandmother died sometime afterwards. In high school, he was taken under Shioya's wing and became his assistant. After being implanted with a Granute organ by Suga, Hanto gains the ability to transform into Kamen Rider Valen (仮面ライダーヴァレン, Kamen Raidā Varen). After the final battle, he begins to publish the existence of Granutes and Dark Treats in response to the surviving former Stomach Inc.'s part-timers and Lizel Jaldak.

In an alternate universe depicted in the film Kamen Rider Gavv: Invaders of the House of Snacks, Hanto works as a food delivery rider.

Utilizing the Chocodon Gochizo in conjunction with the Valen Buster (ヴァレンバスター, Varen Basutā) firearm, Hanto can transform into Kamen Rider Valen Chocodon Form (チョコドンフォーム, Chokodon Fōmu). While transformed, he gains superhuman athleticism. Additionally, he can assume a variety of forms using other Gochizo, which are as follows:

- Doumaru Form (ドーマルフォーム, Dōmaru Fōmu): An auxiliary form accessed from the Doumaru Gochizo that equips Hanto with the twin forearm-mounted expandable Doumaru Grab Rings (ドーマルグラブリング, Dōmaru Gurabu Ringu).
- Bushel Form: An auxiliary form accessed from the Bushel Gochizo that grants similar capabilities as Shoma's version.
- Chocold Form (チョコルドフォーム, Chokorudo Fōmu): An upgraded version of Chocodon Form accessed from the Chocold Gochizo that increases the capabilities of the original form. However, using the Chocold Gochizo to transform is progressively lethal.

Later in the series, Hanto acquires his own Vrastum Gear, which allows him to assume the following forms:

- Frappe Custom (フラッペカスタム, Furappe Kasutamu): Hanto's final form accessed from the Frappeis Gochizo that grants cryokinesis and the use of the Chocodon Gun to dual wield alongside the Valen Buster. However, like Shoma's Blizzardsorbet Form, he can only use this form for a certain amount of time before the Frappeis Gochizo melts and forcefully cancels his transformation.
- Parfait Mode (パルフェモード, Parufe Mōdo): A special form accessed from the Chocorappa Gochizo that grants ergokinesis. This form appears exclusively in the V-Cinema Kamen Rider Gavv: Guilty Parfait.

Hanto Karakida is portrayed by Yusuke Hino (日野 友輔, Hino Yūsuke). As a child, Hanto is portrayed by Yura Kimura (木村 優来, Kimura Yura).

=== Sachika Amane ===
Sachika Amane (甘根 幸果, Amane Sachika) is the CEO of the jack of all trades Hapipare (はぴぱれ) shop where Shoma works and lives. She uses her connections on social media to help Hanto with his work, and later to help the Riders protect humans from Stomach Inc., especially after Shoma tells her the truth about himself.

Sachika Amane is portrayed by Nozomi Miyabe (宮部 のぞみ, Miyabe Nozomi).

=== Rakia Amarga ===
Rakia Amarga (ラキア・アマルガ, Rakia Amaruga), code-named Lage Nine (ラーゲ9, Rāge Nain), is a jellyfish-themed Granute miner who lost his younger brother Comel due to Dark Treats, leading the latter to be murdered by Glotta. Upon being hired by Lango as punishment for attempting to steal Dark Treats from a nearby available stall and secretly planning to destroy them, Rakia uses this opportunity to destroy Stomach Inc. from the inside while regretfully serving as their part-timer for the time being. He possesses the ability to generate energy tentacles that can paralyze his victims into euphoric states, allowing him to capture several humans all at once. When he was briefly promoted by Nyelv from part-timer to enforcer, before his true intention to destroy Stomach Inc. is exposed, Rakia gains the ability to transform into Kamen Rider Vram (仮面ライダーヴラム, Kamen Raidā Vuramu). One month after Suga's defeat, Rakia occupies the scientist's former hideout as his new permanent home. During the final battle, he decides to return to his home world and destroy the interdimensional gates that connect the two worlds while sending his Doppudding and Purujelly Gochizo to live in the human world. After the restoration of one of the interdimensional gates, he decides to watch the gate.

In an alternate universe depicted in the film Kamen Rider Gavv: Invaders of the House of Snacks, Rakia properly works part-time at Stomach Inc.

In a "what-if" alternate timeline separate from the events of the series and depicted in the web special Kamen Rider Vram: Route Stomach, Rakia avenges Comel's death at the cost of his own life.

Utilizing the Doppudding Gochizo in conjunction with the Vrastum Gear (ヴラスタムギア, Vurasutamu Gia) belt, Rakia can transform into Kamen Rider Vram Pudding Custom (プリンカスタム, Purin Kasutamu). While transformed, he wields the Vram Breaker (ヴラムブレイカー, Vuramu Bureikā), which can switch between Bow Mode (弓モード, Yumi Mōdo) and Sickle Mode (鎌モード, Kama Mōdo). He also retains his energy tentacles, which he can use as a weapon. Additionally, he can assume a variety of forms using other Gochizo, which are as follows:

- Jelly Custom (ゼリーカスタム, Zerī Kasutamu): An auxiliary form accessed from the Purujelly Gochizo that grants invisibility. However, using this ability is potentially fatal, as it will cause Rakia's heart to stop beating while in effect.
- A la Mode Mode (アラモードモード, A Ra Mōdo Mōdo): Rakia's final form accessed from the Puddinte Gochizo that clads him in metallic armor and grants ferrokinesis. In this form, he wields the Silver Defenser (シルバディフェンサー, Shiruba Difensā) shield.
- Jelly Custom Noir (ゼリーカスタムノアール, Zerī Kasutamu Noāru): A special form accessed from the Purujelly Noir Gochizo that grants umbrakinesis. This form appears exclusively in the web special Kamen Rider Vram: Route Stomach.

Rakia Amarga is portrayed by Kohei Shoji (庄司 浩平, Shōji Kōhei).

== Recurring characters ==
=== Granutes ===
The Granutes (グラニュート, Guranyūto) are a race of monsters from the Granute World (グラニュート界, Guranyūto-kai) that, like Shoma, have mouth-like Gavv (ガヴ, Gavu) organs on their abdomens, with staple food for their diets being chunks of hard objects, such as rocks or metals. They possess the ability to turn humans into ribboned Human Press (ヒトプレス, Hito Puresu) plates using long tongues from their modified Gavvs. In order to save the trapped victims from having their happiness be used as ingredients for Dark Treats, the Human Press' ribbons must be cut without breaking the victims' plate-like state. Utilizing one of several Mimic Key (ミミックキー, Mimikku Kī) USB flash drives in conjunction with their modified Gavvs, or Mimic Deviser (ミミックデバイザー, Mimikku Debaizā) belts in the case of the Stomach family, the Granutes can assume human forms.

Following the falls of Stomach and Jaldak families, the Granute World's civilization has been reformed under a new president's management.

==== Stomach family ====
The Stomach family (ストマック家, Sutomakku-ke) is an upper-class family who run the Stomach Inc. (ストマック社, Sutomakku-sha) confectionery company in the Granute World, co-founded by the brothers Dente and Zomb, the latter of whom served as acting CEO. Stomach Inc. was originally a legitimate company, until Zomb corrupted it when he and most of his descendants began to manufacture Dark Treats (闇菓子, Yamigashi) illegally as part of their plan to take over the Granute World. As human happiness is an ingredient needed for their Dark Treats, the siblings kidnap happy humans to process them into ingredients. Because of how addictive Dark Treats are for the consumers, it puts the Granute World's civilization into chaos, driving the inhabitants who consumed it once into stealing confectionary from the nearest available stalls.

In an alternate universe depicted in the film Kamen Rider Gavv: Invaders of the House of Snacks, Dark Treats were never invented and Stomach Inc. is researching human snacks to find new product ideas.

===== Lango Stomach =====
Lango Stomach (ランゴ・ストマック, Rango Sutomakku) is the Fáfnir-themed eldest son of the Stomach family and the CEO of Stomach Inc., who secretly murdered his father who he considered a shame on their bloodline for having a child with a human. He extends this hatred towards Shoma, forcing him as a child to watch the execution of Hanto's mother. Following the Jaldak family's takeover of Stomach Inc., Lango loses his position as CEO to Lizel and is put in charge of ingredient procurement until his first defeat by Kamen Rider Gavv, receiving a scar on his face as he fakes his death. Lango temporarily helps the Riders defeat Bocca to regain control of his family's business and take over the late president's agenda of turning the human world into a Human Press farm before challenging Shoma to one last duel where he is ultimately destroyed by him.

In battle, Lango wields a sword.

Lango Stomach is portrayed by Takashi Tsukamoto (塚本 高史, Tsukamoto Takashi).

===== Glotta Stomach =====
Glotta Stomach (グロッタ・ストマック, Gurotta Sutomakku) is the kraken-themed eldest daughter of the Stomach family, who is in charge of product manufacturing. She is also the murderer of Shoma's mother, Rakia's brother, and eventually her great-uncle Dente. Following Lango's disappearance, Glotta is briefly put in charge of ingredient procurement until she succumbs to her injuries at the hands of Kamen Rider Vram, with Kamen Rider Gavv's help, and dies in Lango's arms.

In a "what-if" alternate timeline separate from the events of the series and depicted in the web special Kamen Rider Vram: Route Stomach, Glotta is destroyed by Kamen Rider Vram, but her scythe blown away by her destruction mortally wounds him.

In battle, Glotta wields a scythe.

Glotta Stomach is portrayed by Machi Chitose (千歳 まち, Chitose Machi).

===== Nyelv Stomach =====
Nyelv Stomach (ニエルブ・ストマック, Nierubu Sutomakku) is the Jörmungandr-themed second son of the Stomach family, who is in charge of technology development, and formerly his great-uncle Dente's disciple. Upon learning of Dente's Kamen Rider system surgery through modifying Shoma's Gavv, followed by Suga's own Kamen Rider system compatible surgery on humans proving to be successful, Nyelv becomes interested in gathering combat data on the Riders. He and Suga were directly responsible for Hanto becoming a Kamen Rider, having sent Otake to kill his mentor Shioya and steal the lower half of his Human Press before Hanto found the upper half. Following Suga's defeat, Nyelv keeps his promise to continue the former's work. He later attempts to have Bocca assassinated by forming an alliance with Shoma, only to fail and ultimately die himself.

In a "what-if" alternate timeline separate from the events of the series and depicted in the web special Kamen Rider Vram: Route Stomach, Nyelv kills a dying Rakia when the latter refuses a deal to resume his role in killing Shoma in exchange for medical treatment.

In battle, Nyelv wields a bladed bow that can separate into a pair of swords.

Nyelv Stomach is portrayed by Ryo Takizawa (滝澤 諒, Takizawa Ryō).

===== Siita Stomach =====
Siita Stomach (シータ・ストマック, Shīta Sutomakku) is the Sköll-themed youngest daughter of the Stomach family and the twin sister of Jiip, who is in charge of ingredient procurement, speaks in a masculine tone, and dresses like a boy. She is later fired from the company due to her failures. She ultimately sacrifices herself to save Jiip from being destroyed by Kamen Rider Gavv.

In battle, Siita wields a handgun.

Siita Stomach is portrayed by Honoka Kawasaki (川﨑 帆々花, Kawasaki Honoka).

===== Dente Stomach =====
Dente Stomach (デンテ・ストマック, Dente Sutomakku) is the hafgufa-themed great-uncle of Shoma and the Stomach siblings, and a former researcher for Stomach Inc. When he and his brother Zomb co-founded Stomach Inc., Dente was unaware of his brother's crimes on kidnapping humans for the Dark Treats' ingredients, and his brother's influences affected his descendants, barring Shoma. At the behest of his nephew Bouche, Dente was responsible for Shoma's transformation into a Kamen Rider through surgically modifying his Gavv, and is directly responsible for the Gochizo's existence. After the surgery was a success, he went to live as a recluse in the human world's mountains. As his condition and age were starting to take a toll on him, Dente sacrifices the teeth from his Gavv to create the Gochipod. He is killed by Glotta once she discovers his location.

Dente Stomach is voiced by Yōhei Tadano (多田野 曜平, Tadano Yōhei).

===== Bouche Stomach =====
Bouche Stomach (ブーシュ・ストマック, Būshu Sutomakku) was the father of Shoma and the Stomach siblings, and the former second CEO of Stomach Inc. He fell in love with Michiru and took her to live with him in the Granute World. The reason he pretended to be abusive towards Shoma and Michiru was to protect them from being betrayed by the Stomach siblings at early ages, who have since been corrupted by their father's influence, and ultimately entrusted his uncle Dente to modify Shoma's Gavv so that he may transform him into a Kamen Rider and surpass his former siblings and atone Stomach's name. Following Lango's assassination of Bouche, Shoma's older siblings take over the family business, leading to his wife's death by their hands and Shoma's escape to the human world.

Bouche Stomach is voiced by Ryota Takeuchi (竹内 良太, Takeuchi Ryōta).

===== Zomb Stomach =====
Zomb Stomach (ゾンブ・ストマック, Zonbu Sutomakku) was the paternal grandfather of Shoma and the Stomach siblings, the older brother of Dente, and the founder of Stomach Inc. He was responsible for the corruption of Stomach Inc. into a drug company by kidnapping humans as the secret ingredients for Dark Treats without Dente's notice, leading to Dente getting disillusioned and abandon the family after modifying Shoma's Gavv.

Zomb Stomach is voiced by Bin Shimada (島田 敏, Shimada Bin).

==== Agents ====
The Agents (エージェント, Ējento) are raven-themed humanoid servants of the Stomach family and the in-person link between Stomach Inc. and their part-timers blending in with human society. Each Agent is created by a Stomach family member in a similar fashion to how Shoma creates the Gochizo. They give Dark Treats to the company's part-timers in return for the humans they kidnapped.

The Agents are voiced by Kōki Sakurai (櫻井 皓基, Sakurai Kōki) and Ayu Shōji (東海林 亜祐, Shōji Ayu).

==== Part-timers ====
The part-timers are Granutes addicted to Dark Treats who are hired by Stomach Inc. to kidnap humans for the company in exchange for more of said confection. Each Granute is given a code name while working as a part-timer. After Rakia destroys the interdimensional gates between the Granute World and the human world, most of the part-timers who were once deployed by a now destroyed Stomach Inc. are left stranded on the latter world, with at least one of them reforming like Dente and Lago.

- Hound (ハウンド, Haundo): A hound-themed Granute whose human form is a man with glasses. He is destroyed by Kamen Rider Gavv. His human form is portrayed by Jin Katagiri (片桐 仁, Katagiri Jin).
- Whiple (ウィップル, Wippuru): An octopus-themed Granute whose human form is a jogger. He is destroyed by Kamen Rider Gavv. His human form is portrayed by Yoshiyuki Tsubokura (坪倉 由幸, Tsubokura Yoshiyuki).
- Bon (ボン): A porcupinefish-themed Granute whose human form is a female food truck employee. He is destroyed by Kamen Rider Gavv. Voiced by Akihiko Ishizumi (石住 昭彦, Ishizumi Akihiko) while his human form is portrayed by Kana Takanashi (小鳥遊 可奈, Takanashi Kana).
- Otake (オタケ): A mushroom-themed Granute whose human form is a street illusionist performer. He occasionally uses a "disappearing act" stunt by covering himself and his victims in his robe to avoid his identity being noticed, until Shoma exposes his Gavv to the public. His upper body contains a mucus that allows him to survive Kamen Rider Gavv's Gummy Gochizo-themed finishers. Outside of his false street performances, Otake was hired by Nyelv and Suga to kill Hanto's mentor Shioya and steal his Human Press' lower half for Nyelv before Hanto found the upper half. In retaliation for murdering Shioya, he is destroyed by a vengeful Hanto, who had finished undergoing surgery to become Kamen Rider Valen. His human form is portrayed by Junichiro Nishino (西野 純一郎, Nishino Jun'ichirō).
- Dean (ディーン, Dīn): A sardine-themed Granute whose human forms are a gallery manager named Katsumi Iwashimizu (岩清水 克美, Iwashimizu Katsumi) and an Italian art dealer named Amant Sardina (アマント・サルディーナ, Amanto Sarudīna). He possesses the ability to clone himself. As a result of Sachika's interference, the real Dean is destroyed by both Kamen Riders Gavv and Valen. His human forms of Katsumi Iwashimizu and Amant Sardina are portrayed by Yōhei Kaneshige (金重 陽平, Kaneshige Yōhei) and Kourosh Amini respectively.
- Yard (ヤード, Yādo): A hermit crab-themed Granute whose human form is a cake shop owner. He likes to kidnap children and possesses the ability to merge with a location he took over to assume his full form while housing the victims he kidnapped within his shell. He is destroyed by Kamen Rider Gavv. His human form is portrayed by Ryotaro Akazawa (赤澤 遼太郎, Akazawa Ryōtarō).
- Early (アーリー, Ārī): An alligator-themed Granute whose human form is an elementary school student. He performs a social romance scam to lure female victims under different aliases, such as "Niwa" (ニワ) and "Getaro" (ゲタロウ, Getarō), while framing Hanto in the process. He is destroyed by Kamen Rider Gavv, with Kamen Rider Valen's civilian identity having been cleared. Voiced by Miou Tanaka (田中 美央, Tanaka Miō) while his human form is portrayed by Gaku Katō (加藤 岳, Katō Gaku).
- Rojoe (ロジョー, Rojō): A crab-themed Granute whose human form is a street musician named Kani (可児). He is destroyed by Kamen Riders Gavv and Valen. His human form is portrayed by Yosuke Kishi (岸 洋佑, Kishi Yōsuke).
- Chooul (チョール, Chōru): A bird-themed Granute whose human form is a woman with a red scarf, white outfit, and beige hat. Upon his true identity being exposed, Chooul suffers a breakdown into publicly revealing his true form and kidnapping his victims, leading to his demise at the hands of Kamen Rider Gavv. Voiced by Tomoaki Maeno (前野 智昭, Maeno Tomoaki) while his human form is portrayed by Nanami Kameda (龜田 七海, Kameda Nanami).
- Smeeal (スミール, Sumīru): An octopus-themed Granute whose human form is a yakiniku restaurant owner. He was a close friend of Otake, whom Hanto destroyed in his first time as a Kamen Rider. He exploits a greedy desire of Hanto's old friend Kataro Kentani (拳谷 加太郎, Kentani Katarō) into betraying Hanto, then betrays Kataro as well before attempting to kill Hanto to avenge Otake. However, due to the interference of the Chocold Gochizo who grants Kamen Rider Valen a new power, Smeeal is ultimately destroyed. His human form is portrayed by Pink Machiura (街裏 ぴんく, Machiura Pinku).
- Le Beet (ル・ビート, Ru Bīto): A Japanese rhinoceros beetle-themed Granute who stole the VTube persona account of Koji Minamoto (源 浩二, Minamoto Kōji) to lure his victims and frame Koji, due to losing his Mimic Key. He also possesses information related to the death of Rakia's brother Comel. When Rakia's infiltration of Stomach Inc. is exposed, Le Beet accepts the bounty put on the former's head, only to be destroyed by him, thus clearing Koji's name. Voiced by Yūki Ono (小野 友樹, Ono Yūki).
- Ochiru (オチル): A monkey-themed Granute whose human form is a sentō owner. He targets the winning basketball team he spectated during the matches, and uses his sentō as luring area through offering them free baths. He is destroyed by Kamen Riders Gavv and Valen. His human form is portrayed by Katsuhiro Higo (肥後 克広, Higo Katsuhiro).
- Ripper (リッパー, Rippā): A mantis-themed Granute whose human form is a barber shop owner. He was the second suspect behind the death of Comel when Rakia recognizes a similar slash mark his brother had that caused his death. Before Kamen Rider Vram destroys him, Ripper is revealed to not be Comel's murderer. His human form is portrayed by Tappei Sakaguchi (坂口 辰平, Sakaguchi Tappei).
- Lago (ラゴー, Ragō): A hyena-themed Granute whose human form is a wagashi craftsman named Kenji Saito (斎藤 健二, Saitō Kenji). He was the kidnapper of Hanto's mother Sae, which ultimately led to her death at the hands of Lango. Having regretted doing Stomach Inc.'s dirty work upon learning the truth behind the Dark Treats' secret ingredients, he deserted the company and stayed in the human world for atonement, thanks to the Andou family. Although he is spared by Hanto after proving his regret for causing Sae's death in the first place, Lago ends up being killed by Glotta, shortly after his identity has been exposed. His human form is portrayed by Mutsuo Yoshioka (吉岡 睦雄, Yoshioka Mutsuo).
- Te Sou (テ・ソー, Te Sō): A crab-themed Granute whose human form is a fortune teller. He is destroyed by Kamen Rider Gavv. His human form is portrayed by Tomonori Mizuno (水野 智則, Mizuno Tomonori).

===== Comel Amarga =====
Comel Amarga (コメル・アマルガ, Komeru Amaruga) was Rakia's chipmunk-themed younger brother who became a part-timer after getting addicted to Dark Treats. Although he got cold feet halfway in and tried to run away, Comel was purged by Glotta and died in Rakia's arms while apologizing to him.

Comel Amarga is voiced by Kazutomi Yamamoto (山本 和臣, Yamamoto Kazutomi).

===== Other part-timers =====
- Young (ヤング, Yangu): A wakame-themed Granute whose human form is a sweets influencer named Wakamen (ワカメン). He is destroyed by Kamen Rider Gavv. This Granute appears exclusively in the Hyper Battle DVD special Kamen Rider Gavv: Gourmet Snacks and Woo!-mai Wakamen!!. His human form is portrayed by Masamichi Satonaka (里中 将道, Satonaka Masamichi).

==== Jaldak family ====
The Jaldak family (ジャルダック家, Jarudakku-ke) are the royal family of the Granute World who assume control of Stomach Inc. after learning about its operations.

With the Jaldak and Stomach families having fallen to the hands of Kamen Riders, they are replaced by a new royal family who begin to reform the Granute World under their new management.

===== Bocca Jaldak =====
Bocca Jaldak (ボッカ・ジャルダック, Bokka Jarudakku) is the Cthulhu-themed dictator of the Granute World and the head of his family who takes over Stomach Inc. thanks to Jiip, who married his daughter. His main goal is to turn the human world into a Human Press farm by conquering it and remaining in power by any means necessary. He is destroyed by Kamen Riders Gavv, Valen, and Vram, with Lango's help.

Bocca Jaldak is voiced by Hiroki Yasumoto (安元 洋貴, Yasumoto Hiroki) while his human form is portrayed by Takeru Funaki (舟木 健, Funaki Takeru).

===== Lizel Jaldak =====
Lizel Jaldak (リゼル・ジャルダック, Rizeru Jarudakku) is Bocca's Nyarlathotep-themed daughter, who becomes Jiip's wife. She first met Jiip when she inadvertently saved him from committing suicide. Following the Jaldak family's takeover of Stomach Inc., she replaces Lango as the company's CEO. After losing her father and husband, as well as having the interdimensional gates between the Granute World and the human world destroyed by Rakia, a now widowed Lizel is left stranded on the latter world. After the restoration of one of the interdimensional gates, she returns to her home world.

Lizel Jaldak is portrayed by Elena Kamata (鎌田 英怜奈, Kamata Elena).

==== Butlers ====
The Butlers (バトラー, Batorā) are Deep One-themed humanoid servants of the Jaldak family, similar to the Stomach family's Agents in being created to serve.

The Butlers are voiced by Hiroki Shimowada (下和田 ヒロキ, Shimowada Hiroki).

==== Other Granutes ====
- Izik Perut (イジーク・プルト, Ijīku Puruto): The moose-themed son of the Granute whom Bocca assassinated. After accidentally restoring one of the interdimensional gates between the Granute World and the human world, he targets Lizel to pay off his grudge against Bocca. He is destroyed by Kamen Rider Valen. This Granute appears exclusively in the V-Cinema Kamen Rider Gavv: Guilty Parfait. Voiced by Ryōhei Kimura (木村 良平, Kimura Ryōhei).
- Guguna (ググナ): A bat-themed former part-timer who is left stranded in the human world and is in cahoots with Chotaro Sawamura in his plan to revive Dark Treats. He is destroyed by Kamen Rider Gavv. This Granute appears exclusively in the V-Cinema Kamen Rider Gavv: Guilty Parfait. His human form is portrayed by Rui Tabuchi (田淵 累生, Tabuchi Rui).
- Kawa (カワ): A former part-timer who is left stranded in the human world. This Granute appears exclusively in the V-Cinema Kamen Rider Gavv: Guilty Parfait. His human form is portrayed by Takashi (たかし).
- Kura (クラ): A former part-timer who is left stranded in the human world. This Granute appears exclusively in the V-Cinema Kamen Rider Gavv: Guilty Parfait. His human form is portrayed by Yui Anri (安里 唯, Anri Yui).

=== Gochizo ===
The Gochizo (ゴチゾウ, Gochizō) are tiny snack-themed familiars who are born from Rider Gavvs, such as Shoma's Gavv, the Bitter Gavv, or the Breed Gavv, after they consume human world snacks and grant access to the Riders' powers. Their species' namesake is coined by Sachika. Gochizo normally have limited lifespans, as they will fade away after being used as transformation items. However, there are certain subspecies who can be used more than once, such as the immortal Caking and Puddinte. Nyelv later creates his own cup-shaped artificial Gochizo for Kamen Rider Vram's use, as well as mass-produced mechanical Gochizo to carry out Booca's plans of conquering the human world.

Each Gochizo is based on one of 18 subspecies categories; Gummy (グミ, Gumi), Snack (スナック, Sunakku), Marshmallow (マシュマロ, Mashumaro), Choco (チョコ, Choko), Candy (キャンディ, Kyandi), Doughnut (ドーナツ, Dōnatsu), Cake (ケーキ, Kēki), Pudding (プリン, Purin), Jelly (ゼリー, Zerī), Ice (アイス, Aisu), Cookie (クッキー, Kukkī), Senbei (せんべい), Ramune (ラムネ), Macaron (マカロン, Makaron), Popcorn (ポップコーン, Poppukōn), Caramel (キャラメル, Kyarameru), Special (スペシャル, Supesharu), and Extra (エクストラ, Ekusutora). Additionally, there is the crossover-exclusive Rider (ライダー, Raidā) subspecies, the stage show-exclusive Scone (スコーン, Sukōn) subspecies, and the movie-exclusive Sweets (スイーツ, Suītsu) subspecies.

- Poppingummy (ポッピングミ, Poppingumi): A grape-themed Gummy subspecies. In an alternate universe depicted in the film Kamen Rider Gavv: Invaders of the House of Snacks, there exist peach and honey-themed versions of the Poppingummy Gochizo.
- Kickingummy (キッキングミ, Kikkingumi): An orange-themed Gummy subspecies.
- Vrocan (ブルキャン, Burukyan): A lollipop-themed Candy subspecies.
- Byunbei (ビュンベイ): A Senbei subspecies.
- Cookikkie (クッキッキー, Kukkikkī): A sugar cookie-themed Cookie subspecies.
- Zakuzakuchips (ザクザクチップス, Zakuzakuchippusu): A potato chips-themed Snack subspecies.
- Chocodan (チョコダン, Chokodan): A milk chocolate-themed Choco subspecies.
- Chocodon (チョコドン, Chokodon): A white chocolate-themed Choco subspecies.
- Punchingummy (パンチングミ, Panchingumi): A soda-themed Gummy subspecies.
- Fuwamallow (ふわマロ, Fuwamaro): A vanilla-themed Marshmallow subspecies.
- Marumallow (まるマロ, Marumaro): A strawberry-themed Marshmallow subspecies.
- Hirihirichips (ヒリヒリチップス, Hirihirichippusu): A spicy potato chips-themed Snack subspecies.
- Bubble Ramune (バブルラムネ, Baburu Ramune): A Ramune subspecies.
- Gurucan (グルキャン, Gurukyan): A spiral lollipop-themed Candy subspecies.
- Bakucan (バクキャン, Bakukyan): A drop-themed Candy subspecies.
- Doumaru (ドーマル, Dōmaru): A Doughnut subspecies.
- Bushel (ブシュエル, Bushueru): A Yule log-themed Cake subspecies.
- Caking (ケーキング, Kēkingu): A strawberry cake-themed Cake subspecies.
- Doppudding (どっプリン, Doppurin): A crème caramel-themed Pudding subspecies.
- Purujelly (ぷるゼリー, Puruzerī): A cherry-themed Jelly subspecies.
- Sparkingummy (スパーキングミ, Supākingumi): A cola-themed Gummy subspecies.
- Eleganmacaron (エレガンマカロン, Ereganmakaron): A Macaron subspecies.
- Vrocan Spicy (ブルキャンスパイシー, Burukyan Supaishī): A muscovado lollipop-themed Candy subspecies.
- Chocold (チョコルド, Chokorudo): A dark chocolate-themed Choco subspecies.
- Blizzardsorbei (ブリザードソルベエ, Burizādosorubē): An Ice subspecies. Voiced by Kazuki Kyan (喜屋武 和輝, Kyan Kazuki).
- Breacookie (ブレイクッキー, Bureikukkī): A chocolate chip cookie-themed Cookie subspecies.
- Frappeis (フラッぺいず, Furappeizu): A two-in-one Choco subspecies composed of the chocolate syrup-themed Frappe Ichiro (フラッペ一郎, Furappe Ichirō) and the frappé coffee-themed Frappe Jiro (フラッペ二郎, Furappe Jirō). Voiced by Hiroki Shimowada, who also voices the Jaldak family butlers.
- Popburn (ポップバーン, Poppubān): A Popcorn subspecies.
- Caramelmel (キャラメルメル, Kyaramerumeru): A Caramel subspecies.
- Amondcokikie (アモンドクッキッキー, Amondokukkikkī): An almond-themed Cookie subspecies.
- Hagigoro (はぎごろう, Hagigorō): A botamochi-themed Special subspecies.
- Crepuna (クレプーナ, Kurepūna): A crêpe-themed Special subspecies.
- Mitaramotti (みたらもっち, Mitaramotchi): A mitarashi dango-themed Special subspecies.
- Mogimaru (もぎまる): A kusa mochi-themed Special subspecies.
- Doranosuke (どらのすけ): A dorayaki-themed Special subspecies.
- Bakibakistick (バキバキスティック, Bakibakisutikku): A potato sticks-themed Snack subspecies.
- Puddinte (プリンテ, Purinte): A pudding à la mode-themed Pudding subspecies. Voiced by Kurumi Madoka (円 くるみ, Madoka Kurumi).
- Marble Breacookie (マーブルブレイクッキー, Māburu Bureikukkī): A chocolate marble cookie-themed Cookie subspecies.
- Prujelly (ぷるゼリー, Puruzerī): A melon-themed Jelly subspecies.
- Dummy Gochizo: Ple (ダミーゴチゾウ:PLE, Damī Gochizō Pure; Pleasure): A pink-colored Extra subspecies.
- Dummy Gochizo: Ope (ダミーゴチゾウ:OPE, Damī Gochizō Ope; Operate): A blue-colored Extra subspecies.
- Amazingummy (アメイジングミ, Ameijingumi): A magma-themed Gummy subspecies.
- Mofupachi (もふパチ): A cotton candy-themed Candy subspecies.
- Happymuffi (ハピマフィ, Hapimafi): A muffin-themed Special subspecies.
- Zeztz (ゼッツ, Zettsu): A Kamen Rider Zeztz-themed Rider subspecies.

==== Other Gochizo ====
- Kuuga (クウガ, Kūga): A Kamen Rider Kuuga-themed Rider subspecies who appears exclusively in the final episode of Kamen Rider Gotchard.
- Kungfu Ramen (カンフーラーメン, Kanfū Rāmen): An instant noodles-themed Snack subspecies who appears exclusively in the Hyper Battle DVD special Kamen Rider Gavv: Gourmet Snacks and Woo!-mai Wakamen!!.
- Choco Treasure (チョコトレジャー, Choko Torejā): A namesake-themed Choco subspecies who appears exclusively in the Hyper Battle DVD special Kamen Rider Gavv: Gourmet Snacks and Woo!-mai Wakamen!!.
- Partea Scone (パーTEAスコーン, Pātī Sukōn): A Scone subspecies who appears exclusively in the stage show Kamen Rider Gavv: Strange Sweets Tea Party.
- Terror (テラー, Terā): A tooth decay-themed namesake subspecies born from the artificial human-Granute hybrids' Breed Gavvs when they feel fear who appears exclusively in the film Kamen Rider Gavv: Invaders of the House of Snacks.
- Hexenheim: A Sweets subspecies born from Taorin's Breed Gavv who appears exclusively in the film Kamen Rider Gavv: Invaders of the House of Snacks. Voiced by Kurumi Madoka.
- Uehouse (ウエハウス, Uehausu): A wafer-themed namesake subspecies who appears exclusively in the film Kamen Rider Gavv: Invaders of the House of Snacks. Voiced by Hiroki Shimowada.
- Kin Choco (金チョコ, Kin Choko): A gold leaf chocolate-themed Special subspecies who appears exclusively in the Ishikawa Prefecture version of the stage show Kamen Rider Gavv: Final Stage.
- Tako Sen (たこせん): A takoyaki-themed Special subspecies who appears exclusively in the Osaka Prefecture version of the stage show Kamen Rider Gavv: Final Stage.
- Men Sen (メンセン): A pollock roe-themed Special subspecies who appears exclusively in the Fukuoka Prefecture version of the stage show Kamen Rider Gavv: Final Stage.
- Uirou (ういろう, Uirō): A namesake-themed Special subspecies who appears exclusively in the Aichi Prefecture version of the stage show Kamen Rider Gavv: Final Stage.
- Ningyo (ニンギョー, Ningyō): A ningyōyaki-themed Special subspecies who appears exclusively in the Tokyo version of the stage show Kamen Rider Gavv: Final Stage.
- Chocorappa (チョコらっパ, Chokorappa): A parfait-themed Choco subspecies who appears exclusively in the V-Cinema Kamen Rider Gavv: Guilty Parfait. Voiced by Hiroki Shimowada.
- Purujelly Noir (ぷるゼリーノアール, Puruzerī Noāru): A coffee jelly-themed Jelly subspecies who appears exclusively in the web special Kamen Rider Vram: Route Stomach.

The Gochizo (except Blizzardsorbei, Frappeis, Puddinte, Hexenheim, Uehouse, and Chocorappa) are voiced by Kōki Sakurai and Ayu Shōji, who also voice the Stomach family agents.

=== Soji Shioya ===
Soji Shioya (塩谷 壮士, Shioya Sōji) is a freelance writer, and Hanto's mentor and father figure. He is assassinated by Otake, who was sent by Nyelv to break his Human Press into two halves, with his lower half falling into Nyelv's hands while Hanto secures his upper half.

Soji Shioya is portrayed by Toshimasa Komatsu (小松 利昌, Komatsu Toshimasa).

=== Michiru Inoue ===
Michiru Inoue (井上 みちる, Inoue Michiru) was Shoma's human mother. After discovering the truth behind how the Stomach family makes Dark Treats, she made Shoma promise never to eat their products. Ultimately, her son begun to keep his promise to her when he witnessed how the Dark Treats were created after witnessing the death of Hanto's mother Sae at the hands of Lango. The Stomach family later turned Michiru into a Human Press for their Dark Treats and was killed by Glotta in front of Shoma, causing her son to defect from them and adopt her maiden name. Shoma eventually meets her older brother Masaru, though he is unaware of their relation to each other until after Hanto investigates Michiru's family.

In an alternate universe depicted in the film Kamen Rider Gavv: Invaders of the House of Snacks, Michiru, whose married name is Yasui (安居), has a daughter and runs a pastry shop called Hidamari.

Michiru Inoue is portrayed by Arisa Nakajima (中島 亜梨沙, Nakajima Arisa).

=== Sae Karakida ===
Sae Karakida (辛木田 早恵, Karakida Sae) was Hanto's mother who fell into the hands of Stomach Inc. when her son was still a child. Upon being kidnapped by Lago and taken to Stomach Inc. to be used as ingredients for Dark Treats, she managed to escape and decided to help Shoma find his mother. However, in the midst of finding Michiru and learning the truth behind the company's shady activities with Shoma, Lango captured Sae once again and ultimately turned her into Dark Treats in front of Shoma. As a result, it was her death that made Shoma finally understand why his mother warned him about the Dark Treats.

Sae Karakida is portrayed by Miwako Wagatsuma (我妻 三輪子, Wagatsuma Miwako).

=== Kamen Rider Bitter Gavv ===
Kamen Rider Bitter Gavv (仮面ライダービターガヴ, Kamen Raidā Bitā Gavu) is a moniker of evil Riders who gain similar abilities as Shoma, such as utilizing a Gochizo in conjunction with a belt-like Bitter Gavv (ビターガヴ, Bitā Gavu) (Note: In some media and merchandise, the name "Henshin Belt Bitter Gavv" (変身ベルトビターガヴ, Henshin Beruto Bitā Gavu; Transformation Belt Bitter Gavv) is used for the belt to avoid confusion.) organ, also known as the "Black Gavv" (黒ガヴ, Kuro Gavu), attached to their abdomen to transform. While transformed, they wield the serrated Bitter Gavvgablade (ビターガヴガブレイド, Bitā Gavugabureido) sword, which allows them to absorb up to three Gochizo and harness their abilities at once to perform special attacks. Their personal vehicle is the Vrocan Buggy Spicy (ブルキャンバギースパイシー, Burukyan Bagī Supaishī) ATV, which is summoned from the Vrocan Spicy Gochizo and can be reconfigured into the double-barreled Vrocan Gatling Spicy (ブルキャンガトリングスパイシー, Burukyan Gatoringu Supaishī) cannon. After the Dark Shoma's death and Suga's disappearance, future users of the Bitter Gavv inherit the latter's Bake Magnum as a secondary weapon.

Each Kamen Rider Bitter Gavv utilizes a different Gochizo to assume their Rider form, which are as follows:

- Sparkingummy Form (スパーキングミフォーム, Supākingumi Fōmu): The Dark Shoma's default form accessed from the Sparkingummy Gochizo that grants self-healing capabilities.
- Breacookie Form (ブレイクッキーフォーム, Bureikukkī Fōmu): Magen's default form accessed from the Breacookie Gochizo that grants similar capabilities as Kamen Rider Bake.
  - Marble Breacookie Form (マーブルブレイクッキーフォーム, Māburu Bureikukkī Fōmu): An upgraded version of Breacookie Form and Suga's default form accessed from the Marble Breacookie Gochizo that increases his fighting capabilities to its fullest potential.
- Bakibakistick Form (バキバキスティックフォーム, Bakibakisutikku Fōmu): Jiip's default form accessed from the Bakibakistick Gochizo that grants the ability to generate throwing sticks.

==== Dark Shoma ====
Dark Shoma (ダークショウマ, Dāku Shōma) is a series of evil clones of Shoma who are created by Suga using a sample of his hair and blood. Each clone has a different personality, despite all of them being prone to violence and destruction, and are tasked by their master to become more and more strong in order to transform into what they call "the ultimate life form". They are permanently defeated when Kamen Rider Vram destroys the cloning chamber in Suga's laboratory.

The Dark Shoma are portrayed by Hidekazu Chinen, who also portrays Shoma.

==== Magen ====
Magen (マーゲン, Māgen) is a centipede-themed wealthy merchant and one of Bocca's supporters. After getting addicted to Dark Treats, he receives a transplant from Nyelv to gain his own Bitter Gavv, only to be destroyed by Kamen Rider Gavv.

Magen is voiced by Wataru Takagi (高木 渉, Takagi Wataru) while his human form is portrayed by Shinichi Nihashi (二橋 進一, Nihashi Shin'ichi).

==== Jiip Stomach ====
Jiip Stomach (ジープ・ストマック, Jīpu Sutomakku) is the Hati Hróðvitnisson-themed third son of the Stomach family and the twin brother of Siita, who is in charge of ingredient procurement, speaks in a feminine tone, and dresses like a girl. He is later fired from the company due to his failures. Following Siita's sacrifice, Jiip has a nervous breakdown and cuts his hair to resemble his late sister while swearing vengeance on Shoma. During the period between Rojoe and Suga's deaths, Jiip returns to the Granute World where he contemplates suicide before meeting Lizel, whom he marries and takes her surname, becoming Jiip Jaldak (ジープ・ジャルダック, Jīpu Jarudakku), with a secret aim to make his older siblings suffer for leading Siita to her death at the hands of Shoma. Following the Jaldak family's takeover of Stomach Inc., he becomes the company's vice president. Like Magen, Jiip later receives a transplant from Nyelv to gain his own Bitter Gavv. He ultimately sacrifices himself to save Lizel from being destroyed by Kamen Rider Valen.

In battle, Jiip wields a machete that can separate into a pair of daggers.

Jiip Stomach is portrayed by Ruito Koga (古賀 瑠, Koga Ruito).

==== Kenzo Suga ====
Kenzo Suga (酸賀 研造, Suga Kenzō) is a mysterious Granute researcher who is in cahoots with Nyelv. At some point, he acquired a Granute organ for his Kamen Rider system compatible surgery on humans. He appears to harbor a dark past relating to a baby, who was presumably his son, with the boy's death being the reason he became a nihilistic mad scientist. Following Shoma's appearance as Kamen Rider Gavv, Suga took one of the former's Chocodon Gochizo and used their sample to create the Valen Buster. After Hanto loses his mentor Shioya at the hands of Otake, Suga accepts Hanto's request to transform the latter into a Kamen Rider by surgically implanting the Granute organ into him. In reality, he was involved in orchestrating Shioya's death, having used Hanto as his current test subject for his own end, just like he did to his previous test subjects around 20 years ago. By the time his true intentions have been exposed, Suga gains the ability to transform into Kamen Rider Bake (仮面ライダーベイク, Kamen Raidā Beiku). Following his defeat at the hands of Kamen Rider Valen, a severely injured Suga entrusts Nyelv to continue his work. Suga is kept alive by Nyelv and later used as an experimental subject for the latter's transplant of some parts of a Granute corpse the latter received from Bocca and a Bitter Gavv. As a result of his death during the transplant surgery, he is resurrected as a mindless zombie human-Granute hybrid with his own Bitter Gavv and hypnosis capabilities via the Bake Magnum by Nyelv, only to be put out of his misery by Kamen Rider Vram, who also destroys the Bake Magnum.

Utilizing the Breacookie Gochizo in conjunction with the Bake Magnum (ベイクマグナム, Beiku Magunamu) firearm, Suga can transform into Kamen Rider Bake Breacookie Form. While transformed, he gains similar capabilities as Kamen Rider Valen. However, the side effects of his transformation cause his body to become progressively disoriented.

Kenzo Suga is portrayed by Shintarō Asanuma (浅沼 晋太郎, Asanuma Shintarō).

=== Masaru Inoue ===
Masaru Inoue (井上 優, Inoue Masaru) is Shoma's human uncle and Michiru's older brother who is the owner of a small snacks shop and cafe called Hidamari (ひだまり) that he inherited from its original owner. His parents died from the anxiety and stress of Michiru's disappearance. Sometime after Dente's demise, Masaru ultimately learns of his sister's death from Shoma, but is proud of his nephew's good deeds as a Kamen Rider.

Masaru Inoue is portrayed by Shuhei Handa (半田 周平, Handa Shūhei).

== Guest characters ==
- Baku Yorozu (万津 莫, Yorozu Baku): A lucid dreamer who can transform into Kamen Rider Zeztz (仮面ライダーゼッツ, Kamen Raidā Zettsu). He appears as a cameo in the final episode of Kamen Rider Gavv where he presents Shoma with the Zeztz Gochizo after accidentally bumping into him. Baku Yorozu is portrayed by Ryutaro Imai (今井 竜太郎, Imai Ryūtarō), ahead of his appearance in Kamen Rider ZEZTZ.

== Spin-off characters ==
=== Taorin ===
Taorin (タオリン) is an amnesiac human-Granute hybrid with the DNA of Michiru's alternate self who was created by Qlarp and appears exclusively in the film Kamen Rider Gavv: Invaders of the House of Snacks. After escaping captivity, he was taken in by Sachika's alternate self and works part-time at her shop. Utilizing the Hexenheim Gochizo to evolve his belt-like Breed Gavv (ブリードガヴ, Burīdo Gavu) (Note: In some media and merchandise, the name "Henshin Belt Breed Gavv" (変身ベルト ブリードガヴ, Henshin Beruto Burīdo Gavu; Transformation Belt Breed Gavv) is used for the belt to avoid confusion.) organ attached to his abdomen into the Breed Gavv C3 (ブリードガヴ C3, Burīdo Gavu Shī Surī), Taorin assumes a monster form to fight Kamen Rider Caries, only to be defeated and ultimately die after the latter steals his Breed Gavv C3.

Taorin makes a brief appearance in the series, prior to serving as a major character of the film.

Taorin is portrayed by Sota Nakajima (中島 颯太, Nakajima Sōta).

=== Muter ===
The Muter (ミューター, Mūtā) are a race from another universe that appear exclusively in the film Kamen Rider Gavv: Invaders of the House of Snacks. They have a destructive instinct and have destroyed multiple worlds in various universes.

==== Caries ====
Caries (カリエス, Kariesu) is the Muter king who has the ability to transform into Kamen Rider Caries (仮面ライダーカリエス, Kamen Raidā Kariesu). He is destroyed by Kamen Rider Gavv.

As Kamen Rider Caries, he can assume the following forms:

- C1 (C1(シーワン), Shī Wan): Caries' default form accessed from the Terror Gochizo in conjunction with his belt-like Breed Gavv C1 (ブリードガヴ C1, Burīdo Gavu Shī Wan) organ attached to his abdomen that equips him with a pair of clawed gauntlets, which he can transfer to his shins for increased leg strength.
- C3 (C3(シースリー), Shī Surī): Caries' final form accessed from the Terror Gochizo in conjunction with the Breed Gavv C3, which he stole from Taorin to replace his Breed Gavv C1, that grants the ability to generate black rot.

Caries makes a brief appearance in the series, prior to serving as a major antagonist of the film.

Caries is portrayed by Sekai (世界).

==== Qlarp ====
Qlarp (クラープ, Kurāpu) is a scientist who serves as Caries' right hand. He creates human-Granute hybrids using the DNA of the two species to harvest their Breed Gavvs. He transforms into his monster form Vasshimum (ヴァッシマム, Vasshimamu) to fight the Stomach siblings' alternate selves, only to be destroyed by Lango's alternate self.

Qlarp makes a brief appearance in the series, prior to serving as a secondary antagonist of the film.

Qlarp is portrayed by Keito Kimura (木村 慧人, Kimura Keito).

==== Vasshim Soldiers ====
The Vasshim Soldiers (ヴァッシム兵, Vasshimu-hei) are the Muter's foot soldiers.

=== Mysterious young man ===
The mysterious young man (謎の青年, Nazo no Seinen) is a human-Granute hybrid who was created by Qlarp and appears exclusively in film Kamen Rider Gavv: Invaders of the House of Snacks. After his Breed Gavv is taken by Qlarp, he escapes to the world where Shoma and his allies live, only to end up dying.

The mysterious young man is portrayed by Natsuki Sawamoto (澤本 夏輝, Sawamoto Natsuki).

=== Miyu Yasui ===
Miyu Yasui (安居 未夢, Yasui Miyu) is the daughter of Michiru's alternate self who appears exclusively in the film Kamen Rider Gavv: Invaders of the House of Snacks.

Miyu Yasui is portrayed by Arisa Tsukui (津久井 有咲, Tsukui Arisa).

=== Ayami Kato ===
Ayami Kato (狩藤 綾巳, Katō Ayami) is a doctor who runs a clinic, which accepts people with special circumstances who cannot go to hospitals, and appears exclusively in the V-Cinema Kamen Rider Gavv: Guilty Parfait. He keeps a Granute organ he removed from a Granute who died of disease, for use in research into treatments for Granute diseases. He becomes Hanto's doctor.

Ayami Kato is portrayed by Hirofumi Araki (新木 宏典, Araki Hirofumi).

=== Chotaro Sawamura ===
Chotaro Sawamura (沙和村 超太郎, Sawamura Chōtarō) is a nurse at Kato's clinic who is in cahoots with Guguna in the Granute's plan to revive Dark Treats and appears exclusively in the V-Cinema Kamen Rider Gavv: Guilty Parfait. He sees Granutes as food ingredients and obtains them from Guguna to eat in exchange for helping him with his plan. He dies in the collapse of his hideout.

Chotaro Sawamura is portrayed by Shunya Itabashi (板橋 駿谷, Itabashi Shun'ya).
