= Baku (disambiguation) =

Baku is the capital of Azerbaijan.

Baku may also refer to:

== Places ==
- Baku Governorate, an administrative division of the Russian Empire
- Baku, Ghana, a town in Ghana
- Baku, Nepal, a village development committee

== Ships ==
- Soviet destroyer Baku, a Soviet destroyer leader
- Soviet aircraft carrier Admiral Gorshkov, briefly named Baku

== Arts and entertainment ==
- Baku (manga), by Hakase Mizuki
- Baku, the protagonist of the manga series Jibaku-kun
- Baku Yorozu, the protagonist of the television series Kamen Rider ZEZTZ
- Ba'ku, a fictional planet and race in the Star Trek universe
- Baku, a character from Sanrio.
- Baku Madarame, the protagonist of the manga series Usogui
- Baku Ogata, a character in the video game Shogo: Mobile Armor Division

== Other uses ==
- Baku (mythology), a creature in Japanese mythology said to eat nightmares
- Baku City Circuit, a street circuit in Baku, Azerbaijan
- Makana Baku (born 1998), Congolese-German footballer
- Baku problems, a type of Egyptian mathematical problem from the Moscow Mathematical Papyrus

== See also ==
- Bakul (disambiguation)
