= Kamen Rider Gotchard =

Japanese television drama

- Genre: Tokusatsu; Superhero fiction Science fantasy
- Created by: Shotaro Ishinomori
- Written by: Keiichi Hasegawa; Hiroki Uchida
- Directed by: Ryuta Tasaki
- Starring: Junsei Motojima; Reiyo Matsumoto; Yasunari Fujibayashi; Oto Abe; Rikiya Tomizono; Saki Fukuda; Amon Kabe; Rikuto Kumaki; Itono Okita; Kanon Miyahara; Alisa Sakamaki; Seiichiro Nagata; Kenta Kamakari; Yoko Minamino; Kanji Ishimaru
- Voices of: Misato Fukuen; Nobuyuki Hiyama; Nobuhiko Okamoto; Ryōtarō Okiayu; Kōhei Amasaki; Ayasa Ito
- Narrated by: Katsuyuki Konishi
- Opening theme: "CHEMY×STORY" by Back-On / Back-On×Flow
- Composer: Hiroshi Takaki
- Country of origin: Japan
- Original language: Japanese
- No. of episodes: 50 (list of episodes)

Production
- Producers: Takehiro Ōkawa (TV Asahi); Keisuke Shibataka (TV Asahi); Yōsuke Minato (Toei)
- Running time: 25 minutes
- Production companies: TV Asahi; Toei Company; ADK Emotions

Original release
- Network: ANN (TV Asahi)
- Release: September 3, 2023 – August 25, 2024

Related
- Kamen Rider Geats; Kamen Rider Gavv

Kamen Rider Gotchard (仮面ライダーガッチャード, Kamen Raidā Gatchādo) is a Japanese drama, the 34th entry of Toei Company's Kamen Rider metaseries, and the fifth series to debut during the Reiwa period. The series debuted on September 3, 2023, joining Ohsama Sentai King-Ohger and later, Bakuage Sentai Boonboomger in the Super Hero Time lineup after Kamen Rider Geats's finale. The series concluded on August 25, 2024 and was succeeded by Kamen Rider Gavv. It is the first series to debut an alchemy motif combined with insect, animal, object, and mythical creature motifs.

== Plot ==
Houtaro Ichinose is a student at Furasu High School who one day discovers the Alchemist Academy, a secret school for alchemists, beneath the school. Alchemist Fuga Kudo gives him the GotcharDriver, which gives him the power to transform into Kamen Rider Gotchard, and entrusts him with retrieving the Chemies. These artificial lifeforms were released a decade ago and can fuse with humans to become humanoid monsters called Malgams.

Fuga's daughter Rinne, a student at the Academy who transforms into Kamen Rider Majade, assists him in his task. He is also assisted by Supana Kurogane, a graduate of the Academy who transforms into Kamen Rider Valvarad. He was given the same task, but initially sees the Chemies as tools and serves as a rival to Houtaro, who wants to befriend them. They are opposed by the Three Dark Sisters: Atropos, Clotho, and Lachesis, who intend to use the Chemies for their master, Glion, while creating Kamen Rider Dread systems to counter the Riders. It is later revealed that Fuga's betrayal was due to his discovery of a conspiracy within the Alchemist Union related to Glion's plans. When Glion finally carries out his plan to destroy the world, the Riders are aided by the time-traveling Kamen Rider Gotchard Daybreak, who is revealed to be an alternate version of Houtaro from a future where Glion succeeded in his plan to turn the world into gold. The Riders defeat Glion, who is devoured by the same monster he tried to summon for the sake of his plans.

After Glion's death, the Dark Sisters are joined by Gigist, one of the "Dark Kings" and the creator of the first two Chemies. Ho-Oh Kaguya Quartz briefly reunites with Houtaro from his world to fight Hundred as Kamen Rider Legend when they invade Houtaro's world. To counter Gigist, Houtaro unlocks the true power of the 101st Chemy, Nijigon, which was hidden inside the GotcharDriver to transform into his ultimate form, Rainbow Gotchard. Germain and Gaelijah, two other Dark Kings, also appear and intend to claim a piece of the Philosopher's Stone, the ultimate alchemic artifact, which is contained within Nijigon. The Dark Sisters take advantage of the confrontation between the Dark Kings and the Riders to revive Glion, who was devoured by Germain, by having him emerge from Germain's body and take it over and obtain his powers. Gaelijah and Gigist are destroyed by Rinne and Supana respectively and their powers are also absorbed by Glion, who uses them to transform into Kamen Rider Eldo and to turn the entire world into gold. Houtaro unlocks the true power of his alchemy and uses it to defeat Glion for good and restore the world, while creating a replica of Earth where the Chemies can live in peace.

== Production ==
The Kamen Rider Gotchard trademark was registered by Toei Company on May 15, 2023, and published on May 23, 2023.

Gotchard was officially announced on July 21, 2023. An online production announcement conference introducing the main cast and characters and the artist for the show's theme song was held on August 9, 2023.

The opening theme song "CHEMY×STORY" is performed by rock band Back-On. Starting from episode 17, a new version of the song is performed as a collaboration between Back-On and rock band Flow.

== Episodes ==
No.	Title	Directed by	Written by	Original release date
1	"Gotcha! Hopper1!"; Transliteration: "Gatcha! Hoppā Wan!" (Japanese: ガッチャ！ホッパー1！)	Ryuta Tasaki	Keiichi Hasegawa; Hiroki Uchida	September 3, 2023
2	"Pursuit, Alchemy, Skebows!"; Transliteration: "Tsuiseki, Renkin, Sukebōzu!" (Japanese: 追跡、錬金、スケボーズ！)	Ryuta Tasaki	Keiichi Hasegawa; Hiroki Uchida	September 10, 2023
3	"Bushido, Found."; Transliteration: "Bushidō, Mitsuketari." (Japanese: ブシドー、見つけたり。)	Kyohei Yamaguchi	Keiichi Hasegawa	September 17, 2023
4	"Antrooper Labyrinth"; Transliteration: "Antorūpā Rabirinsu" (Japanese: アントルーパー・ラビリンス)	Kyohei Yamaguchi	Keiichi Hasegawa	September 24, 2023
5	"Burn! Fight! Wrestler G!"; Transliteration: "Moeyo! Tatakae! Resurā Jī!" (Japanese: 燃えよ！斗え！レスラーG！)	Katsuya Watanabe	Keiichi Hasegawa	October 1, 2023
6	"Super A-Class ☆ Twisted Star"; Transliteration: "Chō Ē-kyū ☆ Nejire Sutā" (Japanese: 超A級☆ネジれスター)	Katsuya Watanabe	Keiichi Hasegawa	October 8, 2023
7	"Goodbye Saboneedle"; Transliteration: "Sayonara Sabonīdoru" (Japanese: さよならサボニードル)	Takayuki Shibasaki	Hiroki Uchida	October 15, 2023
8	"Great Bond"; Transliteration: "Gureito na Kizuna" (Japanese: グレイトなきずな)	Takayuki Shibasaki	Hiroki Uchida	October 22, 2023
9	"Dash to Kyoto! School Trip!"; Transliteration: "Dasshu de Kyōto! Shūgaku Ryokō!" (Japanese: ダッシュで京都！修学旅行！)	Ryuta Tasaki	Keiichi Hasegawa	October 29, 2023
10	"Kyoto on Fire! ~Sad Love: Chemy Thunder Incident~"; Transliteration: "Honō no Kyōto! ~Hiren Kemī Raiden Jiken~" (Japanese: 炎の京都！〜悲恋・ケミー雷電事件〜)	Ryuta Tasaki	Keiichi Hasegawa	November 12, 2023
11	"Catch! A Spy!? Rider Disqualified!?"; Transliteration: "Kyatchi! Supai da!? Raidā Shikkaku!?" (Japanese: キャッチ！スパイだ！？ライダー失格！？)	Hirofumi Fukuzawa	Keiichi Hasegawa	November 19, 2023
12	"Runaway Liner! Dark Rider!"; Transliteration: "Bōsō Rainā! Ankoku Raidā!" (Japanese: 暴走ライナー！暗黒ライダー！)	Hirofumi Fukuzawa	Keiichi Hasegawa	November 26, 2023
13	"Take It Back! Friendship × Forever!"; Transliteration: "Torimodose! Yūjō Fōebā!" (Japanese: とりもどせ！ユージョー×フォーエバー！)	Katsuya Watanabe	Keiichi Hasegawa	December 3, 2023
14	"Chomping Rex! Dangerous X"; Transliteration: "Pakutto Rekkusu! Kiken na Ekkusu" (Japanese: パクっとレックス！キケンなエックス)	Katsuya Watanabe	Keiichi Hasegawa	December 10, 2023
15	"Seize the Happy! Shine Bright Gotchalibur!"; Transliteration: "Tsukame Happī! Kagayake Gatcharibā!" (Japanese: 掴めハッピー！輝けガッチャリバー！)	Katsuya Watanabe	Keiichi Hasegawa	December 17, 2023
16	"Crisis Xmas! Orochi Incident"; Transliteration: "Kuraishisu Kurisumasu! Orochi Jihen" (Japanese: クライシスXmas！オロチ事変)	Takayuki Shibasaki	Hiroki Uchida	December 24, 2023
17	"Moonbreak Messenger"; Transliteration: "Mūnbureiku Messenjā" (Japanese: ムーンブレイク・メッセンジャー)	Takayuki Shibasaki	Hiroki Uchida	January 7, 2024
18	"Run Through! Evolutionary Fire Lord!"; Transliteration: "Kakenukero! Shinka no Faiyā Rōdo!" (Japanese: 駆け抜けろ！進化のファイヤーロード！)	Ryuta Tasaki	Hiroki Uchida	January 14, 2024
19	"Rinne's Dawn! Transform Majade!"; Transliteration: "Rin'ne no Yoake! Henshin Majēdo!" (Japanese: りんねの夜明け！変身・マジェード！)	Ryuta Tasaki	Akiko Inoue	January 21, 2024
20	"Smiling Angel, Ridiculous Joke"; Transliteration: "Hohoemu Enjeru, Waraenu Jōku" (Japanese: 微笑む天使(エンジェル), 笑えぬ真実(ジョーク))	Teruaki Sugihara	Keiichi Hasegawa	January 28, 2024
21	"Mad Warrior! The Black Flame Valvarad!"; Transliteration: "Maddo Woriā! Kokuen no Varubarado!" (Japanese: マッドウォリアー！黒炎のヴァルバラド！)	Teruaki Sugihara	Keiichi Hasegawa	February 4, 2024
22	"Love Is a Saber! Suddenly a Chemy Story"; Transliteration: "Ai wa Sāberu! Kemī Sutōrī wa Totsuzen ni" (Japanese: 愛は刃(サーベル)！ケミー・ストーリーは突然に)	Kyohei Yamaguchi	Akiko Inoue	February 11, 2024
23	"Zukkyun Always in My Heart"; Transliteration: "Itsumo Kokoro ni Zukkyun o" (Japanese: いつも心にズッキュンを)	Kyohei Yamaguchi	Akiko Inoue	February 18, 2024
24	"Sudden Turn! Forbidden Steel Rider!"; Transliteration: "Kyūtenchokka! Kindan no Kōtetsu Raidā!" (Japanese: 急転直下！禁断の鋼鉄ライダー！)	Takayuki Shibasaki	Hiroki Uchida	February 25, 2024
25	"A Young Teacher's Mistake"; Transliteration: "Wakaki Sensei no Ayamachi" (Japanese: 若きセンセイの過ち)	Takayuki Shibasaki	Hiroki Uchida	March 3, 2024
26	"Thwart Malice, Jet Black Wind"; Transliteration: "Akui o Habamu, Shikkoku no Uindo" (Japanese: 悪意をハバム、漆黒の風(ウインド))	Ryuta Tasaki	Keiichi Hasegawa	March 10, 2024
27	"Gotcha! Crosshopper!"; Transliteration: "Gatcha! Kurosuhoppā!" (Japanese: ガッチャ！クロスホッパー！)	Ryuta Tasaki	Keiichi Hasegawa	March 17, 2024
28	"Berobero Strange! Renge's Homecoming"; Transliteration: "Berobero Kaiki! Renge no Satogaeri" (Japanese: ベロベロ怪奇！蓮華の里帰り)	Kiyotaka Taguchi	Akiko Inoue	March 24, 2024
29	"The Village Is Crying"; Transliteration: "Kono Mura wa Naiteiru" (Japanese: この村は泣いている)	Kiyotaka Taguchi	Akiko Inoue	March 31, 2024
30	"A Rival Arrives!? Gotcha and Juliet"; Transliteration: "Raibaru Sanjō!? Gatcha to Jurietto" (Japanese: ライバル参上！？ガッチャとジュリエット)	Kyohei Yamaguchi	Keiichi Hasegawa	April 7, 2024
31	"Two People in the Dark, Trusting Each Other."; Transliteration: "Kurayami no Futari, Tagai o Shinjite." (Japanese: 暗闇のふたり、互いを信じて。)	Kyohei Yamaguchi	Keiichi Hasegawa	April 14, 2024
32	"The Great King Appears! The Dolls' Dilemma"; Transliteration: "Arawaru Daiō! Ningyō-tachi no Jirenma" (Japanese: 現る大王！人形たちのジレンマ)	Koichi Sakamoto	Hiroki Uchida	April 21, 2024
33	"Legend Rider? 100 Years Too Early!"; Transliteration: "Rejendo Raidā? Hyaku-nen Hayai na!" (Japanese: 伝説(レジェンド)ライダー？100年早いな！)	Koichi Sakamoto	Hiroki Uchida	April 28, 2024
34	"Only One! All Roads Lead to Gorgeous"; Transliteration: "Onrī Wan! Subete no Michi wa Gōjasu ni Tsūzu" (Japanese: オンリーワン！すべての道はゴージャスに通(ツー)ず)	Takayuki Shibasaki	Hiroki Uchida	May 5, 2024
35	"Gorgeous Time! Legendary Never Ends"; Transliteration: "Gōjasu Taimu! Rejendarī wa Owaranai" (Japanese: ゴージャスタイム！レジェンダリーは終わらない)	Takayuki Shibasaki	Hiroki Uchida	May 12, 2024
36	"The Origin of Chemies! I Understand"; Transliteration: "Kemī no Kigen! Ware wa Rikai Suru" (Japanese: ケミーの起源！我は理解する)	Ryuta Tasaki	Akiko Inoue	May 19, 2024
37	"Hopper1 and the Treasure"; Transliteration: "Hoppāwan to Takaramono" (Japanese: ホッパー1とたからもの)	Ryuta Tasaki	Akiko Inoue	May 26, 2024
38	"Over the Rainbow"; Transliteration: "Niji no Kanata ni" (Japanese: 虹の彼方に)	Kyohei Yamaguchi	Hiroki Uchida	June 2, 2024
39	"Gotcha Complete! Climax 101!"; Transliteration: "Gatcha Kanryō! Kuraimakkusu Wan Ō Wan!" (Japanese: ガッチャ完了！クライマックス101！)	Kyohei Yamaguchi	Hiroki Uchida	June 9, 2024
40	"Evil Descends! The Thrice-Greatest Dark Kings"; Transliteration: "Jaaku Kōrin! San-bai Idai na Meikokuō" (Japanese: 邪悪降臨！三倍偉大な冥黒王)	Koichi Sakamoto	Akiko Inoue	June 16, 2024
41	"Trace of God, Grace of Rainbow!"; Transliteration: "Kami no Torēsu, Niji no Gureisu!" (Japanese: 神の模造品(トレース)、虹の祝福(グレイス)！)	Koichi Sakamoto	Akiko Inoue	June 23, 2024
42	"Let's Search! The 102nd and Brother's Thoughts"; Transliteration: "Rettsu Sōsaku! Hyaku-ni-tai-me to Ani no Omoi" (Japanese: レッツ捜索！102体目と兄の想い)	Kiyotaka Taguchi	Hiroki Uchida	June 30, 2024
43	"Love, Sorrow, and AI? The Power to Erase Hate"; Transliteration: "Ai Ai Ē Ai? Nikushimi o Kesu Chikara" (Japanese: 愛・哀・AI？ 憎しみを消す力)	Kiyotaka Taguchi	Hiroki Uchida	July 7, 2024
44	"When Deep Memories Open Up"; Transliteration: "Dīpu na Kioku ga Hiraku Toki" (Japanese: ディープな記憶が開くとき)	Katsuya Watanabe	Keiichi Hasegawa	July 14, 2024
45	"A Fateful Encounter, a Junction of Love and Hate!"; Transliteration: "Unmei no Deai, Aizō Jankushon!" (Japanese: 運命の出会い、愛憎分岐点(ジャンクション)！)	Katsuya Watanabe	Keiichi Hasegawa	July 21, 2024
46	"Black Astrology, Kurogane's Oath"; Transliteration: "Kuroki Sensei, Kurogane no Sensei" (Japanese: 黒き占星、黒鋼の宣誓)	Kyohei Yamaguchi	Akiko Inoue	July 28, 2024
47	"Big Clash! Houtaro vs. Supana"; Transliteration: "Dai Gekitotsu! Hōtarō Bui Esu Supana" (Japanese: 大激突！宝太郎VSスパナ)	Kyohei Yamaguchi	Akiko Inoue	August 4, 2024
48	"Say Goodbye at Twilight"; Transliteration: "Towairaito ni Sayonara o" (Japanese: 黄昏(トワイライト)にさよならを)	Ryuta Tasaki	Akiko Inoue	August 11, 2024
49	"Metal Warrior! The Silver Valvarad"; Transliteration: "Metaru Woriā! Hakugin no Varubarado" (Japanese: メタルウォリアー！白銀のヴァルバラド)	Ryuta Tasaki	Keiichi Hasegawa	August 18, 2024
50 (Finale)	"This Is My and Your Chemy×Story"; Transliteration: "Kimi to Boku no Kemisutorī" (Japanese: キミと僕のCHEMY×STORY)	Ryuta Tasaki	Hiroki Uchida	August 25, 2024

== Films ==
Kamen Rider Gotchard made his first appearance as a cameo in the film Kamen Rider Geats the Movie: 4 Aces and the Black Fox.

=== Strongest Chemy ★ Gotcha Great Operation ===
Kamen Rider the Winter Movie: Gotchard & Geats Strongest Chemy ★ Gotcha Great Operation (仮面ライダー THE WINTER MOVIE ガッチャード＆ギーツ 最強ケミー★ガッチャ大作戦, Kamen Raidā Za Wintā Mūbī Gatchādo Ando Gītsu Saikyō Kemī Gatcha Dai Sakusen) is a crossover film released on December 22, 2023, starring the casts of Gotchard and Kamen Rider Geats. The film was written by Hiroki Uchida and directed by Kyohei Yamaguchi. The theme song is "All for Love" performed by Blank Paper. The events of the film take place between episode 15 of the series and Kamen Rider Gotchard: What's That!? Houtaro and Rinne Swapped Bodies!!.

=== The Future Daybreak ===
Kamen Rider Gotchard: The Future Daybreak (仮面ライダーガッチャード ザ・フューチャー・デイブレイク, Kamen Raidā Gatchādo Za Fyūchā Deibureiku) is a film released on July 26, 2024, double-billed with Bakuage Sentai Boonboomger: GekijōBoon! Promise the Circuit. Masahiro Inoue reprised his role as Tsukasa Kadoya from Kamen Rider Decade. Additionally, the main character of Kamen Rider Gavv made his first appearance, portrayed by Hidekazu Chinen as Shoma. The film was written by Keiichi Hasegawa and directed by Ryuta Tasaki. The theme song is "THE FUTURE DAYBREAK" performed by Back-On×Flow. The events of the film take place between episodes 43 and 44 of the series.

== Spin-offs ==
- Kamen Rider Gotchard vs. Kamen Rider Legend (仮面ライダーガッチャードVS仮面ライダーレジェンド, Kamen Raidā Gatchādo Bāsasu Kamen Raidā Rejendo): A two-episode web-exclusive special released on Toei Tokusatsu YouTube Official, Toei Tokusatsu Fan Club, TVer, Telasa, Abema, TV Asahi Video, and Amazon Prime Video on November 5, 2023. Masahiro Inoue reprised his voice role as Kamen Rider Decade from Kamen Rider Decade. The events of the specials take place during the early episodes of the series.
- The Three Dark Sisters Present Kamen Rider Gotchard: Unfinished Plan (冥黒の三姉妹プレゼンツ 仮面ライダーガッチャード 未完計画, Meikoku no San Shimai Purezentsu Kamen Raidā Gatchādo Mikan Keikaku): A web-exclusive series released on Toei Tokusatsu Fan Club on December 31, 2023.
- Kamen Rider Gotchard: What's That!? Houtaro and Rinne Swapped Bodies!! (仮面ライダーガッチャード どうする！？宝太郎とりんねがいれかわっちゃった！！, Kamen Raidā Gatchādo Dō Suru!? Hōtarō to Rin'ne ga Irekawatchatta!!): Televi-Kun's "Hyper Battle DVD" (超(ハイパー)バトルDVD, Haipā Batoru Dī Bui Dī). The events of the special take place between Kamen Rider the Winter Movie: Gotchard & Geats Strongest Chemy ★ Gotcha Great Operation and episode 16 of the series.
- We Are Class 3G (我ら3年G(ガッチャ)組, Ware-ra San-nen Gatcha-gumi): A two-episode series included as part of the Blu-ray releases of Kamen Rider Gotchard.
- Gotchard Short Anime GotchAnime: Get Furasu High School's Seven Mysteries! (ガッチャードショートアニメ ガッチャニメ 富良洲高校七不思議をガッチャせよ！, Gatchādo Shōto Anime Gatchanime Furasu Kōkō Nana Fushigi o Gatcha Seyo!): A web-exclusive animated short series released on Toei Tokusatsu Fan Club on April 28, 2024.
- Dark Apocalypse: Lachesis (冥黒の黙示録 ラケシス, Meikoku no Mokushiroku Rakeshisu): A web-exclusive prequel special released on Toei Tokusatsu Fan Club on April 6, 2025. The events of the special take place about ten years before the series. The theme song is "CRY SIS" performed by Three Dark Sisters (Hirono Okita, Kanon Miyahara, and Alisa Sakamaki).
- Kamen Rider Majade with Girls Remix (仮面ライダーマジェード withガールズリミックス, Kamen Raidā Majēdo Wizu Gāruzu Rimikkusu): A web-exclusive crossover special released on Toei Tokusatsu Fan Club on May 11, 2025. Hikaru Yamamoto, Hikari Kabashima, Mei Angela, Rina Chinen, Yukari Taki, Kanon Miyahara, Minami Tsukui, and Nozomi Miyabe reprised their respective roles as Akiko Narumi from Kamen Rider W, Hana Natsuki from Kamen Rider Revice, Reika Shindai and Sophia from Kamen Rider Saber, Sawa Takigawa from Kamen Rider Build, Nozomi Takai from Kamen Rider Amazons, Yoko Minato from Kamen Rider Gaim, and Sachika Amane from Kamen Rider Gavv. The events of the special take place after Kamen Rider Gotchard: Graduations. The theme song is "Go As ONE" performed by Rinne Kudo with Girls Remix (Reiyo Matsumoto, Hikari Kabashima, Mei Angela, and Hikaru Yamamoto).
- Girls Remix in Halloween Party (ガールズリミックス inハロウィンパーティー, Gāruzu Rimikkusu In Harowin Pātī): A web-exclusive crossover special released on Toei Tokusatsu Fan Club on October 26, 2025. Hikaru Yamamoto, Rina Koike, Nene Shida, Hikari Kabashima, Makoto Okunaka, and Machi Chitose reprised their respective roles as Akiko Narumi from W, Shizuka Nomura from Kamen Rider Kiva, Sara Sakurai from Kamen Rider Geats, Hana Natsuki from Revice, Koyomi from Kamen Rider Wizard, and Glotta Stomach from Gavv while Miyuki Sawashiro reprised her voice role as Kiva-la from Kamen Rider Decade. The theme song is "Go As ONE Halloween Ver." performed by Rinne Kudo with Girls Remix (Reiyo Matsumoto, Hikari Kabashima, Mei Angela, and Hikaru Yamamoto).
- Kamen Rider Eins with Girls Remix (仮面ライダーアインズ withガールズリミックス, Kamen Raidā Ainzu Wizu Gāruzu Rimikkusu): A web-exclusive crossover special released on Toei Tokusatsu Fan Club on January 25, 2026. Hikaru Yamamoto, Mei Angela, Hikari Kabashima, Nene Shida, Kanon Miyahara, Yukari Taki, Rumika Fukuda, and Toko Fujita reprised their respective roles as Akiko Narumi from W, Reika Shindai from Saber, Hana Natsuki from Revice, Sara Sakurai from Geats, Nozomi Takai from Amazons, Sawa Takigawa from Build, Rena Kurumi from Kamen Rider 555 20th: Paradise Regained, and Sumiko Ozawa from Kamen Rider Agito while Erina Mano reprised her voice role as Kamen Rider Nadeshiko from Kamen Rider × Kamen Rider Fourze & OOO: Movie War Mega Max. The theme song is "Red Re-born" performed by Do As Infinity.

== V-Cinema ==
Kamen Rider Gotchard: Graduations (仮面ライダーガッチャード GRADUATIONS, Kamen Raidā Gurajuēshonzu) is a V-Cinema release which received a limited theatrical release on February 21, 2025, followed by its DVD and Blu-ray release on June 11, 2025. The events of the V-Cinema take place after the end of the series. The V-Cinema was written by Takahito Oonishi and directed by Kyohei Yamaguchi. The theme song is "GRADUATIONS" performed by Back-On. Alongside the V-Cinema, a short titled Hopper1's Spring Vacation (ホッパー1のはるやすみ, Hoppā Wan no Haruyasumi) was shown as a double bill.

== Novels ==
- X Wizard's Secret Notebook (クロスウィザードの秘密ノート, Kurosu Wizādo no Himitsu Nōto): A short story in the booklet included in the Special Collector's Edition of the Blu-ray release of Kamen Rider the Winter Movie: Gotchard & Geats Strongest Chemy ★ Gotcha Great Operation.
- Novel: Kamen Rider Gotchard: University (小説 仮面ライダーガッチャード University, Shōsetsu Kamen Raidā Gatchādo Yunibāsiti): A novel written by Hiroki Uchida and Yōsuke Minato and released on March 16, 2026. It features episodes 1, 37, 38, 49, and 50 of the 50-episode fictional second season of Gotchard, whose events take place a year after Kamen Rider Gotchard: Graduations.

== Cast ==
- Houtaro Ichinose (一ノ瀬 宝太郎, Ichinose Hōtarō): Junsei Motojima (本島 純政, Motojima Junsei)
- Rinne Kudo (九堂 りんね, Kudō Rin'ne), Mercurin (マーキュリン, Mākyurin; Voice): Reiyo Matsumoto (松本 麗世, Matsumoto Reiyo)
- Supana Kurogane (黒鋼 スパナ, Kurogane Supana), Jupitta (ジュピッタ; Voice): Yasunari Fujibayashi (藤林 泰也, Fujibayashi Yasunari)
- Renge Icho (銀杏 蓮華, Ichō Renge), Kinkiravina (キンキラヴィーナ, Kinkiravīna; Voice): Oto Abe (安倍 乙, Abe Oto)
- Sabimaru Tsuruhara (鶴原 錆丸, Tsuruhara Sabimaru), Isaac (アイザック, Aizakku; Voice), Televi (テレヴィ, Terevi; Voice): Rikiya Tomizono (富園 力也, Tomizono Rikiya)
- Ryo Kajiki (加治木 涼, Kajiki Ryō), Butler (バトラー, Batorā), Firemars (ファイヤマルス, Faiyamarusu; Voice): Amon Kabe (加部 亜門, Kabe Amon)
- Minato (ミナト), Sayzombie (セイゾンビ, Seizonbi; Voice): Rikuto Kumaki (熊木 陸斗, Kumaki Rikuto)
- Atropos (アトロポス, Atoroposu): Itono Okita (沖田 絃乃, Okita Itono)
- Clotho (クロトー, Kurotō), Vanfenrir (ヴァンフェンリル, Vanfenriru; Voice): Kanon Miyahara (宮原 華音, Miyahara Kanon)
- Lachesis (ラケシス, Rakeshisu), Buglesia (バグレシア, Bagureshia; Voice): Alisa Sakamaki (坂巻 有紗, Sakamaki Arisa)
- Ho-Oh Kaguya Quartz (鳳桜・カグヤ・クォーツ, Hōō Kaguya Kwōtsu): Seiichiro Nagata (永田 聖一朗, Nagata Seiichirō)
- Glion (グリオン, Gurion): Kenta Kamakari (鎌苅 健太, Kamakari Kenta)
- Kyoka Edami (枝見 鏡花, Edami Kyōka): Saki Fukuda (福田 沙紀, Fukuda Saki)
- Tamami Ichinose (一ノ瀬 珠美, Ichinose Tamami): Yoko Minamino (南野 陽子, Minamino Yōko)
- Fuga Kudo (九堂 風雅, Kudō Fūga): Kanji Ishimaru (石丸 幹二, Ishimaru Kanji)

=== Voice cast ===
- Hopper1 (ホッパー1, Hoppā Wan)/Crosshopper (クロスホッパー, Kurosuhoppā), Mitemirror (ミテミラー, Mitemirā), Angelead (エンジェリード, Enjerīdo), Carery (ケアリー, Kearī), Customer (50): Misato Fukuen (福圓 美里, Fukuen Misato)
- Steamliner (スチームライナー, Suchīmurainā)/Tenliner (テンライナー, Tenrainā), Repli-Steamliner (レプリスチームライナー, Repuri Suchīmurainā): Nobuyuki Hiyama (檜山 修之, Hiyama Nobuyuki)
- Nijigon (ニジゴン): Nobuhiko Okamoto (岡本 信彦, Okamoto Nobuhiko)
- Gigist (ギギスト, Gigisuto), Donposeidon (ドンポセイドン), DreaDriver (ドレッドライバー, Doreddoraibā): Ryōtarō Okiayu (置鮎 龍太郎, Okiayu Ryōtarō)
- GotcharDriver (ガッチャードライバー, Gatchādoraibā), Smaphone (スマホーン, Sumahōn), Mechanichani (メカニッカニ, Mekanikkani), Renkingrobo (レンキングロボ, Renkingurobo), ValvaraDriver (ヴァルバラドライバー, Varubaradoraibā), Gaiard (ガイアード, Gaiādo), Narrator: Katsuyuki Konishi (小西 克幸, Konishi Katsuyuki)
- AlchemisDriver (アルケミスドライバー, Arukemisudoraibā): Haru Shinonome (東雲 はる, Shinonome Haru)

=== Guest cast ===
- Golem Gōriki (ゴーレム剛力, Gōremu Gōriki; 5, 46): Yukio Naya (納谷 幸男, Naya Yukio)
- Hijiri Himeno (姫野 聖, Himeno Hijiri; 9–10, 44–45): Ayane Kinoshita (木下 彩音, Kinoshita Ayane)
- Licht Kugimiya (釘宮 リヒト, Kugimiya Rihito; 11–12, 15): Yasukaze Motomiya (本宮 泰風, Motomiya Yasukaze)
- Kamen Rider Gotchard Daybreak (仮面ライダーガッチャードデイブレイク, Kamen Raidā Gatchādo Deibureiku; Voice, 16–18): Daigo
- Starshine Hoshino (スターシャイン星野, Sutāshain Hoshino; 28–29), Grandsaturn (グランドサターン, Gurandosatān; Voice, 28–29), Ninetail (ナインテイル, Nainteiru; Voice, 29): Takaya Aoyagi (青柳 尊哉, Aoyagi Takaya)
- Tamiko Misono (美園 民子, Misono Tamiko; 28–29): Toshie Negishi (根岸 季衣, Negishi Toshie)
- Seina Tsukumo (九十九 静奈, Tsukumo Seina; 30–31, 49): Kanon Matsuzawa (松澤 可苑, Matsuzawa Kanon)
- Owarai club members (30): Hirofumi Suzuki (鈴木 浩文, Suzuki Hirofumi), Shinnosuke Takahashi (タカハシ シンノスケ, Takahashi Shin'nosuke)
- Saigetsu (サイゲツ; 32–35): Katsuya Takagi (高木 勝也, Takagi Katsuya)
- Kamen Rider Zein (仮面ライダーゼイン, Kamen Raidā Zein; Voice, 33): Toru Okawa (大川 透, Ōkawa Tōru)
- Hina (ヒナ; 41): Hitomi Isaka (井坂 仁美, Isaka Hitomi; Kamen Rider Girls)
- Koyomi (コヨミ; 41): Chisato Akita (秋田 知里, Akita Chisato; Kamen Rider Girls)
- Mai (マイ; 41): Tomomi Jiena Sumi (鷲見 友美 ジェナ, Sumi Tomomi Jena; Kamen Rider Girls)
- MC (41): Catcher Nakazawa (キャッチャー中澤, Kyatchā Nakazawa)
- Express delivery workers (41): Masaru Yamashita (山下 優, Yamashita Masaru), Kōichi Nakayama (中山 幸一, Nakayama Kōichi)
- Gangster (46, 50): Hiroyuki Matsumoto (松本 博之, Matsumoto Hiroyuki)
- Customers (50): Back-On, Flow, Hiroshi Takaki (高木 洋, Takaki Hiroshi)
- Shoma (ショウマ, Shōma; 50): Hidekazu Chinen (知念 英和, Chinen Hidekazu)

== Theme songs ==
Opening themes

- "CHEMY×STORY"
  - Lyrics: Shoko Fujibayashi (藤林 聖子, Fujibayashi Shōko)
  - Composition & Arrangement: Hi-yunk (Back-On)
  - Artist: Back-On
  - Episodes: 2–16
  Episode 1 does not feature the show's opening sequence, and it is instead used as an insert song in episodes 1, 31, and 39.
- "CHEMY×STORY"
  - Lyrics: Shoko Fujibayashi
  - Composition: Hi-yunk (Back-On)
  - Arrangement: Flow
  - Artist: Back-On×Flow
  - Episodes: 17–50
  Episodes 33, 38, and 50 do not feature the show's opening sequence, and it is instead used as an insert song in episodes 33 and 50.

Insert themes

- "Rising Fighter"
  - Lyrics: Asami Sakata (坂田 麻美, Sakata Asami)
  - Composition: Haruo Yoda (与田 春生, Yoda Haruo), Takatsugu Tsumabuki (妻夫木 崇次, Tsumabuki Takatsugu)
  - Arrangement: Takatsugu Tsumabugi
  - Artist: Beverly
  - Episodes: 2–6, 8, 10–11, 13, 15–16, 50
- "What's your FIRE"
  - Lyrics: Shoko Fujibayashi
  - Composition & Arrangement: tatsuo
  - Artist: Rider Chips
  - Episodes: 18–19, 21–23, 25–28, 31–32, 34–35, 41
- "Kimi ni Zukkyun" (君にズッキュン)
  - Lyrics: Isa Takinoo (瀧尾 沙, Takinoo Isa)
  - Composition & Arrangement: tatsuo
  - Artist: Zukyumpire (ズキュンパイア, Zukyunpaia) (Jyutaro Yamanaka (山中 柔太朗, Yamanaka Jūtarō))
  - Episodes: 22–23
- "Living Legend"
  - Lyrics: Shoko Fujibayashi
  - Composition & Arrangement: Ryo
  - Artist: Ho-Oh Kaguya Quartz (Seiichiro Nagata)
  - Episodes: 33–35
- "THE SKY'S THE LIMIT"
  - Lyrics: Hi-yunk (Back-On), TEEDA
  - Composition & Arrangement: Hi-yunk (Back-On)
  - Artist: Back-On×Beverly
  - Episodes: 38–42, 44, 46, 50
- "Kaze no Shugosha" (風の守護者)
  - Lyrics: Isa Takinoo
  - Composition: Hiroshi Takaki
  - Arrangement: tatsuo
  - Artist: Fuga Kudo (Kanji Ishimaru)
  - Episodes: 50

== International broadcasts ==
- In South Korea, Gotchard began airing since September 7, 2024 on ANIONE and ANIBOX.
