= Bakul =

1954 film directed by Bholanath Mitra

- Directed by: Bholanath Mitra
- Story by: Manoj Basu
- Starring: Rajlakshmi Devi; Uttam Kumar; Arundhati Devi; Tulsi Chakraborty
- Music by: Pranab Dey
- Production company: New Theatres
- Release date: 1954
- Country: India
- Language: Bengali

Bakul was a Bengali drama film directed by Bholanath Mitra. This movie was released in 1954 under the banner of New Theatres. The music direction was done by Pranab Dey. This movie stars Uttam Kumar, Arundhati Devi, Rajlakshmi Devi, Tulsi Chakraborty and Sobha Sen in the lead roles.

== Cast ==
- Arundhati Devi
- Uttam Kumar
- Rajlakshmi Devi
- Tulsi Chakraborty
- Sobha Sen
- Bibhu
- Rekha Chattopadhyay
- Asalata Devi
- Hari Basu
- Sudipta Ray
- Chabi Ghosal
