= Manoj Basu =

Bengali writer (1901-1987)

- মনোজ বসু
- Born: 25 July 1901; Dongaghat, Jessore, British India
- Died: 26 December 1987 (Age 86); Calcutta, West Bengal, India
- Education: Asutosh College
- Relatives: Ramlal Basu (father)
- Awards: Sahitya Akademi Award (1966)

Manoj Basu (Bengali: মনোজ বসু; 25 July 1901 – 27 December 1987) was an Indian writer, dramatist, playwriter and publisher. He is most well known for his novel Nishi-Kutumba. He was awarded Sahitya Akademi Award for the novel in 1966.

== Life ==
Bose was born on 25 July 1901 in a middle-class family in Dongaghat village of Keshabpur police station in Jessore district of British India, present-day Bangladesh. His father, Ramlal Bose, died when Bose was eight, and he could not pass threshold of school. In 1919, he studied at Ripon Collegiate School in Calcutta after passing the entrance examination in the first division. Then, he was admitted to Bagerhat College in Khulna. It was during this time he came in contact with the revolutionary party Jugantar and joined the Swadeshi movement. In 1922, he passed his matriculation and in 1924 he passed his B.A. from South Suburban College in Bhavanipur, Calcutta. Later, he started studying law but could not complete it due to financial reasons.

He started his career as a teacher at South Suburban School and wrote textbooks alongside teaching. Later he established the well known Bengal Publishers Pvt. Ltd. in Calcutta for publishing. Eventually, he devoted himself to Bengali literature and left the teaching profession.

Bose died on 26 December 1987.

== Literary Career ==
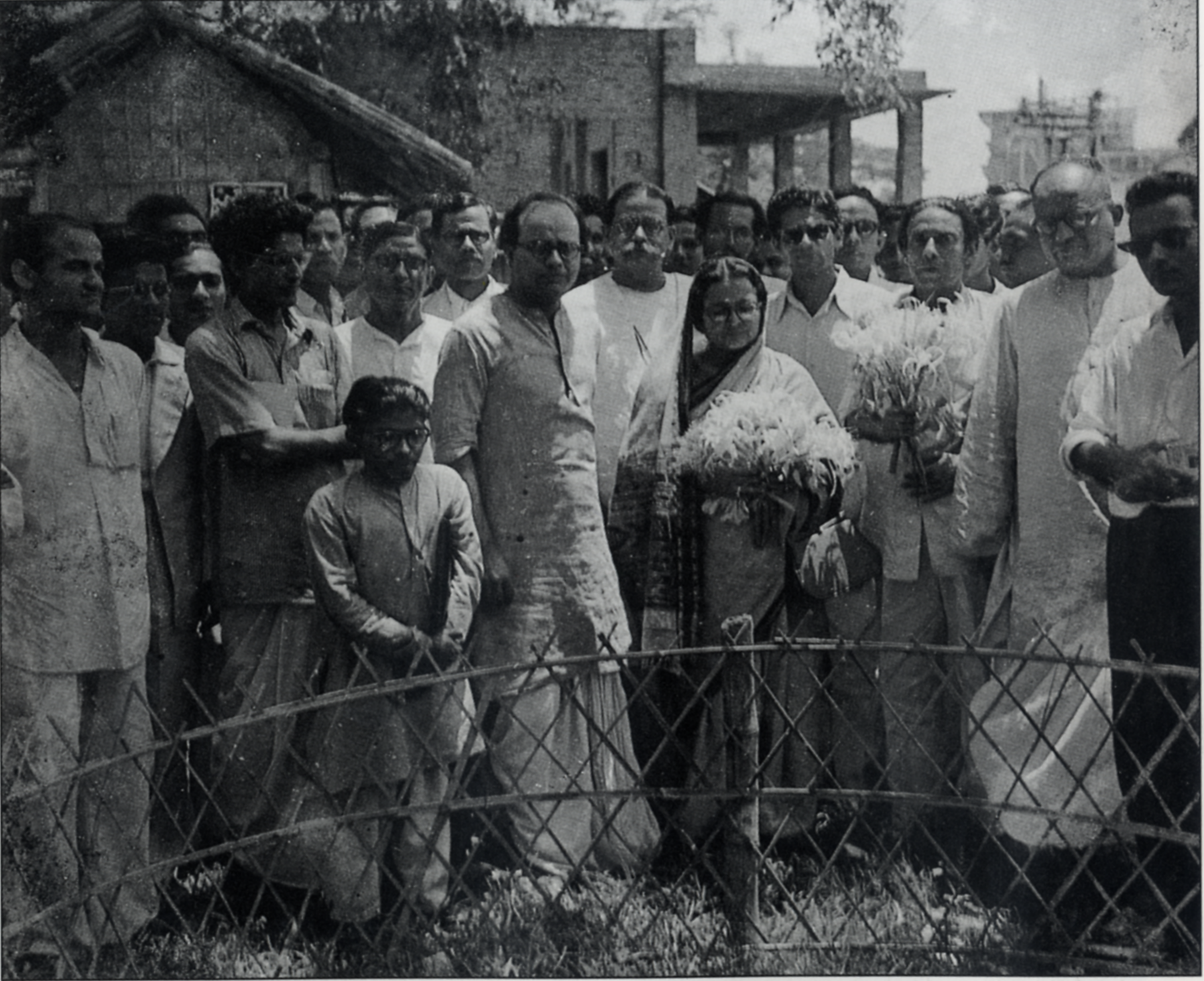
Bose (between the lady and the child) offering flowers to the martyrs' monument of Language Movement during a literature conference in West Bengal, April 1954

He started writing poetry at the age of seven. His first story published in a magazine was Grihahara. Bose published Bratchari Sakha (1933), written by Gurusaday Dutt and edited the monthly magazine Banglar Shakti founded also by Dutt in 1936. Along with publishing and editing work, he started writing novels where he portrayed the daily problems of the country, the individual and the society, the nature of Bengal, and the lifestyle of rural people. Based on the personal lives and political activities of the armed revolutionaries of that time, he wrote his most popular book Bhuli Nai (1943). Several of his books have been translated into Hindi, English, Gujarati, Marathi, Malayalam and several novels have also been made into films. Manoj Bose was one of the members of the presidium of the West Bengal Bangla Academy . He chaired many literary and cultural organizations in India and traveled abroad many times as a representative of the Indian Cultural Team.

== Award and recognition ==
Bose was awarded the prestigious Sahitya Akademi Award for his famous novel Nishi-Kutumba. He was also honoured with the Narasimha Award from the University of Delhi and the Sarat Chandra Medal from the University of Calcutta.

== Major works ==
Novels

- Bhuli Nai (1943)
- Sainik (1946)
- Agast (1946)
- Path Chali (1948)
- Jal Jungle (1951)
- Brishti Brishti (1957)
- Amar Fansi (1959)
- Bon Kete Basat (1961)
- Nishi-Kutumba (1963)
- Rupobati (1969)
- Ami Samrat (1971)
- Sei Gram Sei Sab Manush (1975)
- Bokul
- Ek Bihangee

Storybooks

- Bonomormor (1932)
- Narbadh (1933)
- Debi Kishori (1934)
- Prithibi Kader (1940)
- Basher Kella (1953)
- Angti Chattujjer Vai (Basis of the 1963 film Palatak)
- Khadyot (1976)
- Kacher Akash
- Dukho-Nishar Seshe
- Dilli Onek Dur
- Ulu
- Kumkum

Travelogues

- Chin Dekhe Elam (1953)
- Chabi Ara Chabi (1965)
- Candera Opitha (1966)
- Kalpalata (1966)
- Jhilamila (1968)
- Abar Cheen Dekhe Elam

Plays

- Rakhibandhan (1949)
- Plavon (1954)
- Nutan Prabhat (1951)
- Seshlagna
- Bilashankuj Boarding
- Daak Bangla; play on the basis of Brishti Brishti novel
