= Oum Bakul =

Village in Sudan

- Village
- Country: Sudan
- State: Northern State
- Time zone: UTC+2 (CAT)

Oum Bakul is a village in Northern State, Sudan.

== History ==
On 25 April 2024, the SAF claimed to have repelled three RSF drones doing reconnaissance near Oum Bakul, 70 kilometers south of Merowe.
