= List of Kamen Rider ZEZTZ characters =

Kamen Rider ZEZTZ (仮面ライダーゼッツ, Kamen Raidā Zettsu) is a Japanese tokusatsu series that serves as the 36th installment in the Kamen Rider franchise and the seventh entry in the Reiwa era.

== Main characters ==
=== Baku Yorozu ===
Baku Yorozu (万津 莫, Yorozu Baku) is an unlucky lucid dreamer who becomes an agent of CODE, under the alias Code Number: 7 (コードナンバー：セブン, Kōdo Nanbā: Sebun). Following an incident where he is hit by an unmanned car, Baku has a long precognitive dream that ends with him being killed by Three for insubordination. Afterwards, he wakes up in the real world at the hospital, having retained all of his memories and equipment as he vows to prevent the dark future that befalls him. After the final battle, Baku, unable to return to the real world, creates his own secret organization called Zeztz (ゼッツ, Zettsu) in the dream world to continue protecting people's dreams. He eventually returns to the real world and founded CODE's successor organization to honor his father's heroic legacy against upcoming threats in the epilogue.

Utilizing the Impact (インパクト, Inpakuto) Capsem in conjunction with the sash-like Zeztz Driver (ゼッツドライバー, Zettsu Doraibā) belt, Baku can transform into Kamen Rider Zeztz Physicam Impact (フィジカムインパクト, Fijikamu Inpakuto). While transformed, he gains superhuman strength. He also wields the Breakam Zeztzer (ブレイカムゼッツァー, Bureikamu Zettsā), which can be reconfigured into varying forms, such as Sword Mode (ソードモード, Sōdo Mōdo). Additionally, he can assume a variety of forms and/or their enhanced versions using other Capsems, which are as follows:

- Physicam Transform (フィジカムトランスフォーム, Fijikamu Toransufōmu): An enhanced version of Physicam Impact accessed from the Transform (トランスフォーム, Toransufōmu) Capsem that grants the use of shapeshifting limbs.
- Physicam Wing (フィジカムウイング, Fijikamu Uingu): An enhanced version of Physicam Impact accessed from the Wing (ウイング, Uingu) Capsem that grants a pair of bat wings and the ability to fire blade-like energy projectiles.
- Technolom Stream (テクノロムストリーム, Tekunoromu Sutorīmu): An auxiliary form accessed from the Stream (ストリーム, Sutorīmu) Capsem that grants aero-hydrokinesis. In this form, Baku primarily wields the Breakam Zeztzer in Gun Mode (ガンモード, Gan Mōdo). This form first appears in the film Kamen Rider Gavv: Invaders of the House of Snacks.
  - Technolom Machinery (テクノロムマシーナリー, Tekunoromu Mashīnarī): An enhanced version of Technolom Stream accessed from the Machinery (マシーナリー, Mashīnarī) Capsem that equips Baku with a clawed gauntlet, which can either be expanded or fire a grappling hook.
  - Technolom Projection (テクノロムプロジェクション, Tekunoromu Purojekushon): An enhanced version of Technolom Stream accessed from the Projection (プロジェクション, Purojekushon) Capsem that clads Baku in a photokinetic mantle, which grants self-duplication capabilities.
- Esprim Recovery (エスプリムリカバリー, Esupurimu Rikabarī): An auxiliary form accessed from the Recovery (リカバリー, Rikabarī) Capsem that grants the ability to restore objects and/or heal other organisms. In this form, Baku primarily wields the Breakam Zeztzer in Axe Mode (アックスモード, Akkusu Mōdo).
  - Esprim Barrier (エスプリムバリア, Esupurimu Baria): An enhanced version of Esprim Recovery accessed from the Barrier (バリア, Baria) Capsem that equips Baku with a pair of forearm-mounted shields, which can combine to generate a force field.
- Paradigm Wonder (パラダイムワンダー, Paradaimu Wandā): An auxiliary form accessed from the Wonder (ワンダー, Wandā) Capsem that grants size-shifting capabilities. In this form, Baku primarily wields the Breakam Zeztzer in Scythe Mode (サイズモード, Saizu Mōdo).
  - Paradigm Gravity (パラダイムグラヴィティ, Paradaimu Guraviti): An enhanced version of Paradigm Wonder accessed from the Gravity (グラヴィティ, Guraviti) Capsem that equips Baku with a pair of gyrokinetic gauntlets.
- Inazuma Plasma (イナズマプラズマ, Inazuma Purazuma): An upgrade form accessed from the Plasma (プラズマ, Purazuma) Capsem that grants electrokinesis and superhuman speed. In this form, Baku wields the Inazuma Blaster (イナズマブラスター, Inazuma Burasutā), which can switch between its bow-like Arrow Mode (アローモード, Arō Mōdo) and its double-bladed Sword Mode. He can also combine the Inazuma Blaster and the Breakam Zeztzer's Breakam Blade (ブレイカムブレード, Bureikamu Burēdo) to access the former's Great Sword Mode (グレートソードモード, Gurēto Sōdo Mōdo). However, prolonged use of this form puts Baku at risk of electrical overload.
  - Plasma Booster (プラズマブースター, Purazuma Būsutā): The evolved form of Inazuma Plasma accessed from the Booster (ブースター, Būsutā) Capsem that increases the electrokinetic abilities of the original form and grants warp speed capabilities.
- Impact Zeroider (インパクトゼロイダー, Inpakuto Zeroidā): An enhanced version of Physicam Impact accessed from the Zeztz & CODE Zeroider (ゼッツ&コードゼロイダー, Zettsu Ando Kōdo Zeroidā) Capsem that fuses Baku with the CODE Zeroider to grant pyrokinesis and superhuman speed. This form appears exclusively in the Hyper Battle DVD special Kamen Rider ZEZTZ: Send 'Em Flying! Giant Robot CODE Zeroider!!.
- Visions (ヴィジョンズ, Vijonzu): A special form accessed from an unnamed Capsem that grants the ability to generate spectral colors. This form appears exclusively in the stage show Kamen Rider ZEZTZ: Into the Dream.
- Physicam Advance (フィジカムアドバンス, Fijikamu Adobansu): A special form accessed from the Advance (アドバンス, Adobansu) Capsem that grants pyrokinesis. This form appears exclusively in the stage show Kamen Rider ZEZTZ: Final Stage.

Following his encounter with the Catastrophe Gore Nightmare, Baku acquires the UCAV-like Dualmare (デュアルメア, Dyuarumea) Capsem, which allows him to assume one of his two super forms. In these forms, he wields the Triple Zeztzer (トリプルゼッツァー, Toripuru Zettsā) Gatling gun.

- Catastrom (カタストロム, Katasutoromu): Baku's vermilion-colored super form accessed from the Dualmare Capsem's Catastrom Mode (カタストロムモード, Katasutoromu Mōdo) that grants chaokinesis and the ability to channel any of his preexisting forms' powers. However, if he is hesitant about defeating his opponents for even a moment, the Dualmare Capsem will strain his body and forcefully cancel his transformation.
- Orderm (オルデルム, Oruderumu): Baku's gray-colored super form accessed from the Dualmare Capsem's Orderm Mode (オルデルムモード, Oruderumu Mōdo) that grants ordokinesis and the ability to separate Nightmares from their human hosts.

Later in the series, Baku acquires an upgraded version of the Zeztz Driver called the Zeztz Exdream Driver (ゼッツエクスドリームドライバー, Zettsu Ekusudorīmu Doraibā), which allows him to assume the following power-up forms:

- Kamen Rider Zeztz Exdream (仮面ライダーゼッツエクスドリーム, Kamen Raidā Zettsu Ekusudorīmu): Baku's final form accessed from the UFO-like Exdreamrise (エクスドリームライズ, Ekusudorīmuraizu) Capsem that increases his oneirokinesis to its fullest potential, but overusing this ability will cause his body and mind to strain, and grants the combined powers of his preexisting Capsems, excluding Dualmare.
  - Kamen Rider Zeztz Agendream (仮面ライダーゼッツエージェンドリーム, Kamen Raidā Zettsu Ējendorīmu): The evolved form of Zeztz Exdream accessed from the Agent (エージェント, Ējento) Capsem in conjunction with an upgraded version of the Zeztz Exdream Driver called the Zeztz Agendream Driver (ゼッツエージェンドリームドライバー, Zettsu Ējendorīmu Doraibā) that grants the combined powers of Code Numbers: 0-7. This form appears exclusively in the film Kamen Rider ZEZTZ: Farewell Mission.
- Heart of Impact (ハートオブインパクト, Hāto Obu Inpakuto): An enhanced version of Physicam Impact accessed from the eponymous Capsem that increases the capabilities of the original form. While assuming this form, the Zeztz Exdream Driver becomes the Zeztz Agendream Driver.

Baku Yorozu is portrayed by Ryutaro Imai (今井 竜太郎, Imai Ryūtarō). As a child, Baku is portrayed by Towa Watanabe (渡邉 斗翔, Watanabe Towa).

=== Nem ===
Nem (ねむ, Nemu) is a nationally popular celebrity and the queen of commercials. Once someone sees her, they will definitely have dreams of the young celebrity. She was brought into existence by the Phantom Gore Nightmare before her mother The Lady put her up for adoption to keep CODE from taking her away. As a child, Nem lived in several children's care facilities until Masumi Bijogi (美女木 真澄, Bijogi Masumi), the CEO of her talent agency, adopted her. Four years prior to the series, she was involved in a car accident that put her into a comatose state before The Lady kidnapped her. In Baku's premonition, she is awakened from her comatose state by the young agent before CODE captures her for experimentation. She eventually awakens from her comatose state as Baku takes her into his custody. In an effort to destroy the Oblivion Gore Nightmare, Nem erases herself from existence, only to be rescued by her friends. After the final battle, she resumes her celebrity career in the real world while spending quality time with a dream entity of her mother in the dream world.

Nem is portrayed by Maho Horiguchi (堀口 真帆, Horiguchi Maho). As a child, Nem is portrayed by Yuuka (有香, Yūka).

=== Nox ===
Nox (ノクス, Nokusu) is a mysterious man who was an agent of CODE, under the alias Code Number: 4 (コードナンバー：フォー, Kōdo Nanbā: Fō). His true identity is Kensei Odaka (小鷹 賢政, Odaka Kensei), a detective of the Tokyo Metropolitan Police Department and a member of its Mysterious Case Division before resigning and disappearing a year prior to the series, discarding his original name and identity in the process. In Baku's premonition, he is the leading force behind the Nightmare attacks until Kamen Rider Zeztz kills him. He was temporarily brainwashed by Three into serving CODE once again until Kamen Rider Zeztz uses the Shock Capsem to undo the mind control. When Zero is killed by the Catastrophe Gore Nightmare, Nox ultimately carries out the former's last mission to destroy CODE and expose information regarding the organization's conspiracy and the Nightmares' involvement since ancient times. After the final battle, he returns to the Mysterious Case Division.

Throughout the series, Nox has assumed the following forms as he wields the Breakam Buster (ブレイカムバスター, Bureikamu Basutā), which can switch between its longsword-like Calibur Mode (カリバーモード, Karibā Mōdo) and its rifle-like Launcher Mode (ランチャーモード, Ranchā Mōdo), in battle:

- Nox Knight (ノクスナイト, Nokusu Naito): Nox's Kamen Rider-esque warrior form accessed from the Erase (イレイス, Ireisu) Capsem in conjunction with the sash-like Knight Invoker (ナイトインヴォーカー, Naito Invōkā) belt that grants nihilikinesis.
- Kamen Rider Nox (仮面ライダーノクス, Kamen Raidā Nokusu): Nox's Rider form accessed from the Shadow (シャドウ, Shadō) Capsem in conjunction with the sash-like NOX Driver (ノクスドライバー, Nokusu Doraibā) belt that grants umbrakinesis. Additionally, he can assume a variety of forms known as Shadows using other Capsems.
  - Gun Shadow (ガンシャドウ, Gan Shadō): An auxiliary form accessed from the Gun (ガン, Gan) Capsem that equips Nox with a right forearm-mounted cannon.
  - Wolf Shadow (ウルフシャドウ, Urufu Shadō): An auxiliary form accessed from the Wolf (ウルフ, Urufu) Capsem that equips Nox with a right forearm-mounted blade.
  - Midnight Shadow (ミッドナイトシャドウ, Middonaito Shadō): Nox's final form accessed from the eponymous two-in-one Capsem, which is created from the Shadow Capsem, that grants photo-umbrakinesis and the ability to cast illusions.
  - Extra Shadow (エクストラシャドウ, Ekusutora Shadou): A special form accessed from the Extra Capsem that equips Nox with a right forearm-mounted shield. This form appears exclusively in the stage show Kamen Rider ZEZTZ: Final Stage.

Nox is portrayed by Yuki Furukawa (古川 雄輝, Furukawa Yūki).

=== Sieg ===
Sieg (ジーク, Jīku) is a terrorist from a criminal family who was sentenced to 1000 years in prison for assassinating people in their dreams, including his father Karl (カール, Kāru), and an agent of CODE, under the alias Code Number: 1 (コードナンバー：ワン, Kōdo Nanbā: Wan), before meeting and absorbing the Punish Gore Nightmare. He is ultimately defeated by Kamen Rider Zeztz Exdream, though he can reappear as a dream entity if dreamers think about him. After the Code: Somnia Capsem is stolen, he is initially accused of said theft by Baku, who uses the Dualmare Capsem to separate him and the Punish Gore Nightmare. With Nem's encouragement, Sieg destroys the Punish Gore Nightmare to atone for his past crimes. After the final battle, he spends all his time waiting for his allies in the real world to remember him in their dreams.

Utilizing the Punish (パニッシュ, Panisshu) Capsem in conjunction with the Breakam Dawn (ブレイカムドォーン, Bureikamu Dwōn) sword, which can switch between its one-piece Great Sword Mode (大剣モード, Taiken Mōdo) and its two-piece Twin Sword Mode (双剣モード, Sōken Mōdo), Sieg can transform into Kamen Rider Dawn (仮面ライダードォーン, Kamen Raidā Dwōn). While transformed, he can gain either hemokinesis when fused with the Punish Gore Nightmare or pyrokinesis when separated from the latter.

During the events of the stage show Kamen Rider ZEZTZ: Final Stage, Sieg uses the Chaos Capsem to transform into his final form; Kamen Rider Chaos Dawn (仮面ライダーカオスドォーン, Kamen Raidā Kaosu Dwōn). While transformed, he gains the ability to cast illusions and the use of a familiar based on himself known as Phantom Sieg (ファントムジーク, Fantomu Jīku) for combat assistance.

Sieg is portrayed by Kousei Amano (天野 浩成, Amano Kōsei). As a child, Sieg is portrayed by Maru Fujimoto (藤元 萬瑠, Fujimoto Maru).

== Recurring characters ==
=== Tetsuya Fujimi ===
Tetsuya Fujimi (富士見 鉄也, Fujimi Tetsuya) is a detective of the Tokyo Metropolitan Police Department, with the rank of Police Inspector, and the chief of its Mysterious Case Division (怪事課, Kaijika) which investigates mysterious unsolved cases known as Black Cases (ブラックケース, Burakku Kēsu).

Tetsuya Fujimi is portrayed by Kenta Mishima (三嶋 健太, Mishima Kenta).

=== Nasuka Nagumo ===
Nasuka Nagumo (南雲 なすか, Nagumo Nasuka) is an elite rookie detective of the Tokyo Metropolitan Police Department, with the rank of Police Inspector, and a member of its Mysterious Case Division.

Nasuka Nagumo is portrayed by Rina Onuki (小貫 莉奈, Onuki Rina).

=== Minami Yorozu ===
Minami Yorozu (万津 美浪, Yorozu Minami) is Baku's adoptive younger sister and a talent manager who lives with him. Her true identity is an agent of CODE, under the alias Code Number: 17 (コードナンバー：セブンティーン, Kōdo Nanbā: Sebuntīn), assigned to work undercover as Baku's sister. After defeating Lord Thirteen, she starts the Agent Minami Inc. (株式会社エージェント美浪, Kabushikigaisha Ējento Minami) entertainment agency that Nem is affiliated with.

During the events of the web series Kamen Rider ZEZTZ: Series of Sister's Substory: Agent Minami, Minami transforms into the following Kamen Rider-esque warriors:

- Knight Seventeen (ナイトセブンティーン, Naito Sebuntīn): A special form accessed from the CODE Capsem in conjunction with the Knight Invoker that grants similar capabilities as Nox Knight. While transformed, Minami wields the Breakam Buster.
- Lord Seventeen (ロードセブンティーン, Rōdo Sebuntīn): A special form accessed from the CODE Capsem in conjunction with the Lord Invoker that grants similar capabilities as the other Lords. While transformed, Minami primarily wields the Breakam Breaker in Shoot Mode.

Minami Yorozu is portrayed by Miki Yagi (八木 美樹, Yagi Miki).

=== CODE ===
The Confidential Organized Defensive Establishment (極秘防衛機関, Gokuhi Bōei Kikan), abbreviated as CODE (コード, Kōdo), is a clandestine organization who fights against the Nightmares. Each member has an assigned Code Number (コードナンバー, Kōdo Nanbā) alias. The cram school Baku and Kureha attended as children served as a front for CODE's agent training center, and the students in said school's special class which Nox was in charge of in the past were unknowingly trained to be agents through the Dream Learning (ドリームラーニング, Dorīmu Rāningu) process.

Similarly to Baku, certain CODE members utilize spherical Capsem (カプセム, Kapusemu) devices in conjunction with the sash-like Lord Invoker (ロードインヴォーカー, Rōdo Invōkā) belt to transform into Kamen Rider-esque warriors known as Lords (ロード, Rōdo). While transformed, they each carry a Breakam Breaker (ブレイカムブレイカー, Bureikamu Bureikā), which like the Breakam Zeztzer can be reconfigured into varying forms.

==== Zero ====
Code Number: 0 (コードナンバー：ゼロ, Kōdo Nanbā: Zero) is the mysterious commander of CODE who uses the CODE Zeroider (コードゼロイダー, Kōdo Zeroidā) drone, which can switch between its humanoid Robot Mode (ロボットモード, Robotto Mōdo) and its motorcycle-like Vehicle Mode (ビークルモード, Bīkuru Mōdo), as his avatar. He frequently speaks in English and freely switches between it and Japanese when conversing with others. In Baku's premonition, he acts as a mentor to the young agent until Kamen Rider Nox defeats him and steals the CODE Zeroider's memory unit. When Baku eventually awakens from his premonition, the young agent becomes distrustful of Zero for his treatment of CODE's agents. Baku later learns that Zero is his real father.

It is later revealed that when creating the Zeztz Driver, Zero also created the Code: Somnia (コード：ソムニア, Kōdo: Somunia) system and its namesake Capsem as a direct byproduct of heavily studying Sieg's advanced lucid dreaming, and the systemic overarching weapon was intended to merge all human minds into a single controllable dreamscape. However, Code: Somnia was deemed too dangerous to be used in controlling people's dreams against their free will, as it has the potential to consume their existence when malice dreamers briefly transformed into Nightmares. While shutting down CODE and learning that the Nightmares are responsible for the extinction of the dinosaurs and ancient civilizations, Zero plans to reveal CODE and the Nightmares' existence and their unethical activities to the government, as well as coordinate plans with them against the latter faction, only to be killed by the Catastrophe Gore Nightmare.

In battle, Zero wields the Breakam Zeztzer. He also possesses the Booster Capsem, which he can use as either himself to gain superhuman speed or the CODE Zeroider to gain pyrokinesis.

During the events of the film Kamen Rider ZEZTZ: Farewell Mission, a dream entity of Zero utilizes the Break CODE Down (ブレイクコードダウン, Bureiku Kōdo Daun) Capsem in conjunction with the Lord Invoker to transform into Lord Zero (ロードゼロ, Rōdo Zero).

Zero is portrayed by Jay Kabira (川平 慈英, Kabira Jiei).

==== Three ====
Code Number: 3 (コードナンバー：スリー, Kōdo Nanbā: Surī) is the cold-hearted and ruthless executive of CODE. In Baku's premonition, he becomes the young agent's handler following Zero's defeat at the hands of Kamen Rider Nox. Three later overthrows Zero to seize control of Code: Somnia. He is ultimately defeated by Kamen Rider Nox, who uses the Midnight Shadow Capsem to turn his body into several documents containing evidence of CODE's conspiracy.

Utilizing the Extra (エクストラ, Ekusutora) Capsem in conjunction with the Lord Invoker, Three can transform into Lord Three (ロードスリー, Rōdo Surī). While transformed, he primarily wields the Breakam Breaker in its swordbreaker-like Blade Mode (ブレードモード, Burēdo Mōdo). He also possesses the Clear (クリア, Kuria) Capsem, which grants invisibility. During the events of the film Kamen Rider ZEZTZ: Farewell Mission, a dream entity of Three utilizes the Break CODE Down Capsem to transform.

After absorbing Nox's rebellious spirit, the Extra Capsem evolves into the Lord Booster (ロードブースター, Rōdo Būsutā) Capsem, which allows Three to transform into Lord Three Booster (ロードスリーブースター, Rōdo Surī Būsutā). While transformed, he gains the use of several bladed tendrils.

Three is portrayed by Yuki Tamaki (玉城 裕規, Tamaki Yūki).

==== Five ====
Code Number: 5 (コードナンバー：ファイブ, Kōdo Nanbā: Faibu) is an arrogant, brash, and extremely loyal agent of CODE, particularly Zero who raised him like a son after the death of his father. In Baku's premonition, he along with Kureha is killed by Nox. Upon resigning from his post when Three's actions go too far, Five is killed by him for insubordination through setting up an explosive in his car.

Utilizing the Shock (ショック, Shokku) Capsem in conjunction with the Lord Invoker, Five can transform into Lord Five (ロードファイブ, Rōdo Faibu). While transformed, he primarily wields the Breakam Breaker in Knuckle Mode (ナックルモード, Nakkuru Mōdo). During the events of the film Kamen Rider ZEZTZ: Farewell Mission, a dream entity of Five utilizes the Break CODE Down Capsem to transform where he is equipped with a pair of gauntlets.

Five is portrayed by Shin Koyanagi (小柳 心, Koyanagi Shin).

==== Kureha Miyamoto ====
Kureha Miyamoto (宮本 紅覇, Miyamoto Kureha) is a calm and composed agent of CODE, under the alias Code Number: 6 (コードナンバー：シックス, Kōdo Nanbā: Shikkusu), who was a high school classmate of Nasuka. After Three erased her memories of CODE, Kureha worked as a journalist until she regains her memories of being an agent and returns to the organization. In Baku's premonition, she along with Five is killed by Nox. Upon leaking Code: Somnia to Baku, Kureha is killed by Three for insubordination through using the Extra Capsem.

Utilizing the Panic (パニック, Panikku) Capsem in conjunction with the Lord Invoker, Kureha can transform into Lord Six (ロードシックス, Rōdo Shikkusu). While transformed, she primarily wields the Breakam Breaker in its handgun-like Shoot Mode (シュートモード, Shūto Mōdo). During the events of the film Kamen Rider ZEZTZ: Farewell Mission, a dream entity of Kureha utilizes the Break CODE Down Capsem to transform.

Kureha Miyamoto is portrayed by Yuzuki Hirakawa (平川 結月, Hirakawa Yuzuki). As a child, Kureha is portrayed by Aki Kawada (川田 秋妃, Kawada Aki).

==== Eight ====
Code Number: 8 (コードナンバー：エイト, Kōdo Nanbā: Eito) is a remnant of CODE who first appears in the film Kamen Rider ZEZTZ: Farewell Mission. She is recruited by Baku to join his organization ZEZTZ.

Eight is portrayed by Himeno Aoyama (青山 姫乃, Aoyama Himeno).

=== Nightmares ===
The Nightmares (ナイトメア, Naitomea) are monsters that appear in humans' dreams to give them night terrors and turn their fears into reality. When certain Nightmares are destroyed, The Lady can seal them within clamshell designed Capsems for Kamen Rider Nox to use their powers.

- Gun Nightmare (ガンナイトメア, Gan Naitomea): A hoplophobia-based monster born from Baku's subconscious. He is destroyed by Kamen Rider Zeztz and sealed into the Gun Capsem by The Lady. Voiced by Satoshi Tsuruoka (鶴岡 聡, Tsuruoka Satoshi).
- Bomb Nightmare (ボムナイトメア, Bomu Naitomea): An ekrixiphobia-based monster born from Fujimi's subconscious. He is destroyed by Kamen Rider Zeztz. Voiced by Kōsuke Echigoya (越後屋 コースケ, Echigoya Kōsuke).
- Crow Nightmare (クロウナイトメア, Kurō Naitomea): An ornithophobia-based monster born from the subconscious of Miyuki Asamiya (麻宮 みゆき, Asamiya Miyuki), daughter of the Minister of Foreign Affairs. He is destroyed by Kamen Rider Zeztz. Voiced by Masato Sugiyama (杉山 優斗, Sugiyama Masato).
- Prison Nightmare (プリズンナイトメア, Purizun Naitomea): A carcerophobia-based monster born from Bijogi's subconscious. It is destroyed by Kamen Rider Zeztz.
  - Saw Evil (ソウイビル, Sō Ibiru): The Prison Nightmare's robotic foot soldiers.
- Poison Nightmare (ポイズンナイトメア, Poizun Naitomea): A toxiphobia-based monster born from the subconscious of Rentaro Sannoh (山王 廉太郎, San'nō Rentarō), the owner-chef of the Royale Shirogane (ROYALE城金, Roiyaru Shirogane) restaurant. She is destroyed by Kamen Rider Zeztz. Voiced by Ayaka Maekawa (前川 綾香, Maekawa Ayaka).
- Mold Nightmare (モウルドナイトメア, Mōrudo Naitomea): A mysophobia-based monster born from the subconscious of Taro Atsumi (渥美 太郎, Atsumi Tarō), an art forger. He is destroyed by Kamen Rider Zeztz. Voiced by Yasuhiko Kawazu (川津 泰彦, Kawazu Yasuhiko).
- Meteor Nightmare (メテオナイトメア, Meteo Naitomea): A meteorophobia-based monster born from the subconscious of Seiya Ishii (石井 星也, Ishii Seiya), an elementary school student. It is destroyed by Kamen Rider Zeztz. Voiced by Kyohei Yamaguchi (山口 恭平, Yamaguchi Kyōhei).
- Shadow Nightmare (シャドウナイトメア, Shadō Naitomea): A sciophobia-based monster born from Nox's subconscious. He is destroyed by Kamen Rider Zeztz and sealed into the Shadow Capsem by The Lady. Voiced by Kensuke Satō (佐藤 健輔, Satō Kensuke).
  - Midnight Shadow Nightmare (ミッドナイトシャドウナイトメア, Middonaito Shadō Naitomea): An evolution of the Shadow Nightmare born from Nox's subconscious. He is absorbed into the Midnight Shadow Capsem by Nox.
- Wolf Nightmare (ウルフナイトメア, Urufu Naitomea): A lupophobia-based monster born from the subconscious of Haru Kitazato (北里 春, Kitazato Haru), a nurse. His personal vehicle is the Red Flagger (レッドフラッガー, Reddo Furaggā) motorcycle. He is destroyed by Kamen Rider Nox. Voiced by Kōsuke Takaguchi (高口 公介, Takaguchi Kōsuke).
  - Gang Wolf Nightmare (ギャングウルフナイトメア, Gyangu Urufu Naitomea): A scelerophobia-based variant of the Wolf Nightmare born from Nox's subconscious. He is destroyed by Kamen Rider Zeztz and sealed into the Wolf Capsem by The Lady.
- Death Game Nightmare (デスゲームナイトメア, Desu Gēmu Naitomea): A ludophobia-based monster born from Kureha's subconscious. He is destroyed by Kamen Rider Zeztz. Voiced by Setsuji Satō (佐藤 せつじ, Satō Setsuji).
- Baby Nightmare (ベビーナイトメア, Babī Naitomea): A pediophobia-based immature form of the Nightmares. Voiced by Kaori Takaoka (高岡 香, Takaoka Kaori).
- Disaster Nightmare (ディザスターナイトメア, Dizasutā Naitomea): A catastrophobia-based monster born from the collective subconscious of children, including Sōta Watari (渡利 蒼大, Watari Sōta) and Tomoko Taira (平 朋子, Taira Tomoko), who refer to him as the "Demon King" (魔王, Maō). He is destroyed by Kamen Rider Zeztz. Voiced by Akio Kaneda (金田 明夫, Kaneda Akio).
- Cat Nightmare (キャットナイトメア, Kyatto Naitomea): An ailurophobia-based monster born from Minami's subconscious. She is destroyed by Kamen Rider Zeztz. This Nightmare first appears in the web series Kamen Rider ZEZTZ: Series of Sister's Substory: Agent Minami. Voiced by Miki Yagi, who also portrays Minami Yorozu.
- Zeztz Darkness Nightmare (ゼッツダークネスナイトメア, Zettsu Dākunesu Naitomea): A nyctophobia-based monster born from Zero's subconscious who is the source of Baku's constant misfortunes that he experienced throughout his life. He possesses the Darkness (ダークネス, Dākunesu) Capsem, which grants umbrakinesis. He is destroyed by Kamen Rider Zeztz. Voiced by Koichi Yamadera (山寺 宏一, Yamadera Kōichi).

==== Other Nightmares ====
- Gigados Nightmare (ギガドスナイトメア, Gigadosu Naitomea): A robophobia-based monster born from the subconscious of Daisuke Fujitani (藤谷 大輔, Fujitani Daisuke), a professional baseball player. He is destroyed by Kamen Rider Zeztz. This Nightmare appears exclusively in the Hyper Battle DVD special Kamen Rider ZEZTZ: Send 'Em Flying! Giant Robot CODE Zeroider!!.
  - Robot Kaiju Gigados (ロボット怪獣 ギガドス, Robotto Kaijū Gigadosu): The Gigados Nightmare's giant robot.
- Labyrinth Nightmare (ラビリンスナイトメア, Rabirinsu Naitomea): A mazeophobia-based monster born from the subconscious of an unidentified person. He is destroyed by Kamen Rider Zeztz. This Nightmare appears exclusively in the stage show Kamen Rider ZEZTZ: Into the Dream.

==== The Lady ====
The Lady (ザ・レディ, Za Redi) is the mysterious leader of the Nightmares, Nox's handler, and Nem's mother who was an agent of CODE, under the alias Code Number: 2 (コードナンバー：ツー, Kōdo Nanbā: Tsū). After putting her daughter up for adoption, The Lady kept herself awake for 20 years to prevent CODE from invading her dreams and learn of Nem's whereabouts. In Baku's premonition, she uses the CODE Zeroider's memory unit given to her by Nox to locate CODE's Japan branch where she initiates her assault on the organization, only to be killed by Three. When Sieg uses Nem to invade the real world, The Lady enters the dream world to save her using the Phantom Gore Nightmare's power at the cost of being tormented by the latter's hallucinations. She eventually succumbs to her declining mental health as she allows the Phantom Gore Nightmare to absorb her. Upon being mortally wounded by the Phantom Gore Nightmare, The Lady uses their fusion to blind them both and destroy the former before dying in Nem's arms.

In battle, The Lady wields the Lady Gauntlet (レディガントレット, Redi Gantoretto), which she can use in conjunction with either the Chaos (カオス, Kaosu) Capsem to summon Nightmares to fight for her or the Phantom (ファントム, Fantomu) Capsem to generate apparitions.

During the events of the film Kamen Rider ZEZTZ: Farewell Mission, a dream entity of The Lady utilizes the Break CODE Down Capsem in conjunction with the Lord Invoker to transform into Lord Two (ロードツー, Rōdo Tsū). While transformed, she primarily wields the Breakam Breaker in Knuckle Mode.

The Lady is portrayed by Rie Mimura (美村 里江, Mimura Rie).

=== Gore Nightmares ===
The Gore Nightmares (ゴアナイトメア, Goa Naitomea), also known as the Four Gore Nightmare Lords (ゴアナイトメア四天王, Goa Naitomea Shitennō), are a group of monsters who lead the Nightmares to attack humankind.

- Catastrophe Gore Nightmare (カタストロフゴアナイトメア, Katasutorofu Goa Naitomea): An apocalyptophobia-based monster born from Baku's deep subconscious. His power is used by Baku to create the Dualmare Capsem. After he and his fellow Gore Nightmares are awakened, Catastrophe destroys every CODE branch around the world and kills Zero. He is destroyed by Kamen Rider Zeztz Exdream. Voiced by Hiroaki Hirata (平田 広明, Hirata Hiroaki).
- Phantom Gore Nightmare (ファントムゴアナイトメア, Fantomu Goa Naitomea): A phasmophobia-based monster born from The Lady's deep subconscious. She uses her power to create the Phantom Capsem for The Lady before ultimately absorbing her. Following Three's death, Phantom steals the Code: Somnia Capsem to awaken her fellow Gore Nightmare Oblivion. She is destroyed by The Lady. Voiced by Saori Hayami (早見 沙織, Hayami Saori).
- Punish Gore Nightmare (パニッシュゴアナイトメア, Panisshu Goa Naitomea): A mastigophobia-based monster born from Sieg's deep subconscious. He was absorbed into Sieg, who used his power to create the Punish Capsem. Upon being separated from Sieg, Punish abandons him in favor of his fellow Gore Nightmares. He is destroyed by Kamen Rider Dawn. Voiced by Jun Fukuyama (福山 潤, Fukuyama Jun).
  - Death Evil (デスイビル, Desu Ibiru): The Punish Gore Nightmare's robotic foot soldier.
- Oblivion Gore Nightmare (オブリビオンゴアナイトメア, Oburibion Goa Naitomea): An apeirophobia-based monster born from Nem's deep subconscious. He is awakened when a Baby Nightmare consumes the Code: Somnia Capsem. After his fellow Gore Nightmares Catastrophe and Punish are destroyed, Oblivion enacts his plan of erasing the dream world to make Nem suffer. He is destroyed by Kamen Rider Zeztz. Voiced by Junko Takeuchi (竹内 順子, Takeuchi Junko).

==== Other Gore Nightmares ====
- Daydream Gore Nightmare (デイドリームゴアナイトメア, Deidorīmu Goa Naitomea): An oneiropolimaphobia-based monster born from Shuma Kumon's deep subconscious. He is destroyed by Kamen Rider Dawn. This Gore Nightmare appears exclusively in the film Kamen Rider ZEZTZ: Farewell Mission. Voiced by Takayuki Sugō (菅生 隆之, Sugō Takayuki).
- Endless Gore Nightmare (エンドレスゴアナイトメア, Endoresu Goa Naitomea): An apeirophobia-based monster born from people's deep subconscious. He is destroyed by Kamen Rider Zeztz Exdream. This Gore Nightmare appears exclusively in the stage show Kamen Rider ZEZTZ: Final Stage. Voiced by Hiroshi Kamiya (神谷 浩史, Kamiya Hiroshi).

== Guest characters ==
- Ruriko Aoi (葵 るり子, Aoi Ruriko): A member of the Tokyo Metropolitan Police Department's G Unit who is an operator of the Kamen Rider G6 (仮面ライダーG6(ジーシックス), Kamen Raidā Jī Shikkusu) suit. She appears as a cameo in episode 32 of Kamen Rider ZEZTZ where she briefly encounters the CODE Zeroider while helping the elderly. Ruriko Aoi is portrayed by Yuchami (ゆうちゃみ, Yūchami), ahead of her appearance in the film Agito: Psychic War.
- Sora Otosumi (音澄 宙, Otosumi Sora): A young butler who can transform into Kamen Rider My-Th (仮面ライダーマイス, Kamen Raidā Maisu). He appears as a cameo in the final episode of Kamen Rider ZEZTZ where he presents Baku with the Zeztz Ride X-Eggs while visiting the dream world. Sora Otosumi is portrayed by Ikuho Akiya (秋谷 郁甫, Akiya Ikuho), ahead of his appearance in Kamen Rider MY-TH.

== Spin-off characters ==
=== Thirteen ===
Code Number: 13 (コードナンバー：サーティーン, Kōdo Nanbā: Sātīn) is a remnant of CODE who appears exclusively in the web series Kamen Rider ZEZTZ: Series of Sister's Substory: Agent Minami. Following his defeat by Lord Seventeen, the Clear Capsem on his broken Lord Invoker causes him to dissolve into nothingness.

Utilizing the Clear Capsem in conjunction with the Lord Invoker, Thirteen can transform into Lord Thirteen (ロードサーティーン, Rōdo Sātīn). While transformed, he primarily wields the Breakam Breaker in Blade Mode.

Thirteen is portrayed by Takaya Aoyagi (青柳 尊哉, Aoyagi Takaya).

=== Shuma Kumon ===
Shuma Kumon (玖門 宗馬, Kumon Shūma) is the young chairperson of the National Public Safety Commission and Nox's cousin who appears exclusively in the film Kamen Rider ZEZTZ: Farewell Mission. He is arrested following his defeat by Kamen Riders Zeztz Agendream and Nox.

Utilizing the Daydream (デイドリーム, Deidorīmu) Capsem in conjunction with the sash-like Mugen Driver (夢現ドライバー, Mugen Doraibā) belt, Kumon can transform into Kamen Rider Mugen (仮面ライダー夢現, Kamen Raidā Mugen). While transformed, he gains reality warping capabilities. He also wields a katana.

Shuma Kumon is portrayed by Shunta Sono (曽野 舜太, Sono Shunta).
