= List of Super Space Sheriff Gavan Infinity characters =

Super Space Sheriff Gavan Infinity (超宇宙刑事ギャバン インフィニティ, Chō Uchū Keiji Gyaban Infiniti) is a Japanese tokusatsu series that is the first installment in the Project R.E.D. franchise, taking elements from the Metal Hero Series, most notably the first one, Space Sheriff Gavan.

== Main characters ==
=== Space Sheriff Gavans ===
Space Sheriff Gavan (宇宙刑事ギャバン, Uchū Keiji Gyaban) is a title used by individuals from alternate universes in the multiverse known as the Cosmo Layers (コスモレイヤー, Kosumo Reiyā) who transform by utilizing Emorgears in conjunction with the Gavarion Trigger (ギャバリオントリガー, Gyabarion Torigā) firearm. While transformed, they are clad in armored Combat Suits (コンバットスーツ, Konbatto Sūtsu). They also each carry a Gavarion Blade (ギャバリオンブレード, Gyabarion Burēdo) sword.

==== Reiji Doki ====
Reiji Doki (弩城 怜慈, Doki Reiji) is an investigator from the Galaxy Federal Police (銀河連邦警察, Ginga Renpō Keisatsu) Earth Branch Records Division of his universe, which serves as a cover for a top-secret multiverse investigative unit. After an accidental exposure to Yamimakuru (ヤミマクール, Yamimakūru) Emorgy in a past case, he gains the ability to travel between dimensions.

Utilizing the Gekido Emorgear in conjunction with the Gavarion Trigger, Reiji can transform into the red-colored Space Sheriff Gavan Infinity (宇宙刑事ギャバン・インフィニティ, Uchū Keiji Gyaban Infiniti). While transformed, he gains pyrokinesis. Additionally, he can assume the following forms:

- Gavan Infinity R.E.D. (ギャバン・インフィニティ・R.E.D., Gyaban Infiniti Reddo): Reiji's power-up form accessed from a R.E.D. version of the Gekido Emorgear that grants the ability to generate energy weapons, such as the R.E.D. Blade (R.E.D.ブレード, Reddo Burēdo) sword.
- Gavan Infinity Apollon (ギャバン・インフィニティ・アポロン, Gyaban Infiniti Aporon): A special form accessed from an Apollon version of the Gekido Emorgear. This form appears exclusively in the film Super Space Sheriff Gavan Infinity: The Day the Sun Cried.

Reiji Doki is portrayed by Kohei Nagata (長田 光平, Nagata Kōhei). As a child, Reiji is portrayed by Reo Okazaki (岡崎 琉旺, Okazaki Reo).

==== Setsuna Aikokuin ====
Setsuna Aikokuin (哀哭院 刹那, Aikokuin Setsuna) is the captain of the Galaxy Federal Police Public Security Headquarters Special Forces Unit of his universe. He is also an artificial human originally created on Planet Boremos (惑星ボレモス, Wakusei Boremosu) as an expendable soldier for war under the serial number 942 (ナインフォーツー, Nain Fō Tsū), can instantaneously heal, and has lived for thousands of years.

Utilizing the Hisor Emorgear in conjunction with the Gavarion Trigger, Setsuna can transform into the silver-colored Space Sheriff Gavan Bushido (宇宙刑事ギャバン・ブシドー, Gyaban Bushidō). While transformed, he gains cryokinesis. He can also produce a second Gavarion Blade for dual wielding.

Setsuna Aikokuin is portrayed by Ryuga Akahane (赤羽 流河, Akahane Ryūga).

==== Kiki Iwai ====
Kiki Iwai (祝 喜輝, Iwai Kiki) is a forensic investigator from the Galaxy Federal Police Forensics Division of her universe.

Utilizing the Kanky Emorgear in conjunction with the Gavarion Trigger, Kiki can transform into the gold-colored Space Sheriff Gavan Luminous (宇宙刑事ギャバン・ルミナス, Uchū Keiji Gyaban Ruminasu). While transformed, she gains photokinesis.

Kiki Iwai is portrayed by Kokona Sumi (角 心菜, Sumi Kokona).

==== Kunai Kazanami ====
Kunai Kazanami (風波 駆無, Kazanami Kunai) is a member of the Galaxy Federal Police Interstellar Intelligence Division and a Kazanami-Style ninjutsu user. Similarly to Reiji, he can travel between dimensions by using ninjutsu.

Utilizing the Keeg Emorgear in conjunction with the Gavarion Trigger, Kunai can transform into the purple-colored Space Sheriff Gavan Raiya (宇宙刑事ギャバン・ライヤ, Uchū Keiji Gyaban Raiya). While transformed, he gains aerokinesis.

Kunai Kazanami is portrayed by Kentaro Yasui (安井 謙太郎, Yasui Kentarō).

=== Emorgears ===
The Emorgears (エモルギア, Emorugia) are numbered battery-like items that contain special energy life forms known as Emorgies (エモルギー, Emorugī) who react strongly to emotions.

- 01. Gekido (ゲキドー, Gekidō): Reiji's personal anger-based Emorgear that allows him to transform into Space Sheriff Gavan Infinity. It can also assume the form of either Gekido Emorgy R.E.D. Ver. (ゲキドーエモルギー R.E.D. ver., Gekidō Emorugī Reddo Bājon) or Gekido Emorgy Apollon (ゲキドーエモルギー・アポロン, Gekidō Emorugī Aporon).
- 02. Hisor (ヒソオ, Hisoo): Setsuna's personal sorrow-based Emorgear that allows him to transform into Space Sheriff Gavan Bushido.
- 03. Kanky (カンキー, Kankī): Kiki's personal joy-based Emorgear that allows them to transform into Space Sheriff Gavan Luminous. It is temporarily passed on to Kotobuki when she becomes Gavan Luminous in Kiki's place.
- 04. Keeg (キーグ, Kīgu): Kunai's personal fear-based Emorgear that allows him to transform into Space Sheriff Gavan Raiya.
- 05. Tokimeki (トキメッキ, Tokimekki): An infatuation-based auxiliary Emorgear that allows the user to produce a love potion.
- 06. Yada (ヤーダ, Yāda): A disgust-based auxiliary Emorgear that allows the user to create an energy barrier.
- 07. Hazooi (ハズーイ, Hazūi): A shyness-based auxiliary Emorgear that allows the user to remove any camouflage or disguise.
- 08. Darooi (ダルーイ, Darūi): A laziness-based auxiliary Emorgear that allows the user to slow down anyone.
- 10. Lonelyne (ロンリーヌ, Ronrīnu): A loneliness-based auxiliary Emorgear that allows the user to produce cold wind.
- 11. Scutt (スカット, Sukatto): A refreshment-based auxiliary Emorgear that allows the user to heal any abnormal status effects.
- 12. Shinpader (シンペーダー, Shinpēdā): A worry-based auxiliary Emorgear that allows the user to disarm anyone.
- 13. Maikka (マーイッカ, Māikka): Arimoto's personal optimism-based Emorgear that allows him to transform into Space Sheriff Gavan Ameise. As an auxiliary Emorgear, it allows the user to produce a flash of light.
- 14. Moikka (モーイッカ, Mōikka): A defeatism-based auxiliary Emorgear that allows the user to produce darkness.
- 15. Kittoyeene (キットイーネ, Kittoīne): An anticipation-based auxiliary Emorgear that allows the user to extend anything.
- 17. Doushiyon (ドーシヨン, Dōshiyon): An agitation-based auxiliary Emorgear that allows the user to confuse anyone.
- 18. Kofunger (コウフンガー, Kōfungā): An excitement-based auxiliary Emorgear that allows the user to enlarge any body part.
- 19. Tsumanna (ツマンナ, Tsuman'na): A boredom-based auxiliary Emorgear that allows the user to put anyone to sleep.
- 23. Zaiark (ザイアーク, Zaiāku): A guilt-based auxiliary Emorgear that allows the user to produce a small gravitational field.
- 24. Yoriso (ヨリソー, Yorisō): A kindness-based auxiliary Emorgear that allows the user to stick anyone or anything together.
- 26. Yuckamin (ヤッカミン, Yakkamin): Mikage's personal jealousy-based Emorgear that allows him to transform into Space Sheriff Gavan Destiny. As a Nega Emorgear, it allows him to transform into Death Gavan.
- 27. Yukaida (ユカイダー, Yukaidā): Gato's personal pleasure-based Emorgear.

Emorgears is voiced by Ayako Kawasumi (川澄 綾子, Kawasumi Ayako)

=== Cosmo Gavarion ===
The Cosmo Gavarion (コスモギャバリオン, Kosumo Gyabarion) is a spaceship that can travel through the Cosmo Layers via Reiji's powers and transform into a giant robot known as Cosmo Gavarion GC-R (コスモギャバリオン GC-R, Kosumo Gyabarion Jī Shī Āru) when combined with the G-Mangader GC-R (ジマンゲーダー GC-R, Jimangēdā Jī Shī Āru) spaceship, which requires authorization from eight department heads, including Karel and the Supreme Chancellor. It can also combine with the Gavarion Units to form various Type (タイプ, Taipu) combinations, which are as follows:

- Cosmo Gavarion Type Saber (コスモギャバリオン タイプセイバー, Kosumo Gyabarion Taipu Seibā): A combination of the Cosmo Gavarion and Gavarion Saber that can transform into Cosmo Gavarion 10Q (コスモギャバリオン 10Q, Kosumo Gyabarion Ten Kyū).
- Cosmo Gavarion Type Drill (コスモギャバリオン タイプドリル, Kosumo Gyabarion Taipu Doriru): A combination of the Cosmo Gavarion and Gavarion Drill that can transform into Cosmo Gavarion WK-2 (コスモギャバリオン WK-2, Kosumo Gyabarion Wāku Tsū).
- Cosmo Gavarion Type Crane (コスモギャバリオン タイプクレーン, Kosumo Gyabarion Taipu Kurēn): A combination of the Cosmo Gavarion and Gavarion Crane that can transform into Cosmo Gavarion &C (コスモギャバリオン &C, Kosumo Gyabarion Ando Shī).
- Cosmo Gavarion Type Laser (コスモギャバリオン タイプレーザー, Kosumo Gyabarion Taipu Rēzā): A combination of the Cosmo Gavarion and Gavarion Laser that can transform into Cosmo Gavarion G.I. (コスモギャバリオン G.I., Kosumo Gyabarion Jī Ai).
- Cosmo Gavarion Type Dornado (コスモギャバリオン タイプドルネード, Kosumo Gyabarion Taipu Dorunēdo): A combination of the Cosmo Gavarion and Gavarion Dornado that can transform into Cosmo Gavarion K.I. (コスモギャバリオン K.I., Kosumo Gyabarion Kē Ai).
- Cosmo Gavarion EX (コスモギャバリオン EX, Kosumo Gyabarion Ī Ekkusu): A combination of the Cosmo Gavarion and Express Gavarion that can transform into Cosmo Gavarion Ace-Go (コスモギャバリオン ACE-GO, Kosumo Gyabarion Ēsu Gō).

Cosmo Gavarion is voiced by Toshihiko Seki (関 俊彦, Seki Toshihiko)

==== Gavarion Units ====
The Gavarion Units (ギャバリオンユニット, Gyabarion Yunitto) are a series of auxiliary spaceships that can combine with the Cosmo Gavarion. They share the same names as the Space Sheriff Gavans' weapons that resemble them.

- Gavarion Saber (ギャバリオンセイバー, Gyabarion Seibā): A fighter jet-themed spaceship combined with the Onnikill 10Q (オンニキール 10Q, On'nikīru Ten Kyū) spaceship.
- Gavarion Drill (ギャバリオンドリル, Gyabarion Doriru): A tank-themed spaceship combined with the Shiritainder WK-2 (シリタインダー WK-2, Shiritaindā Wāku Tsū) spaceship.
- Gavarion Crane (ギャバリオンクレーン, Gyabarion Kurēn): A crane vessel-themed spaceship combined with the Dejobdan &C (デージョブダン &C, Dējobudan Ando Shī) spaceship.
- Gavarion Laser (ギャバリオンレーザー, Gyabarion Rēzā): A satellite-themed spaceship combined with the Itosha G.I. (イトオーシャ G.I., Itoōsha Jī Ai) spaceship.
- Gavarion Dornado (ギャバリオンドルネード, Gyabarion Dorunēdo): A dragon-themed spaceship combined with the Respectron K.I. (リスペクトロン K.I., Risupekutoron Kē Ai) spaceship. In Kakusei Hunter Omegahorn, this Gavarion Unit is mistaken for a Kakuzyu and given the name Nazokaku (謎角).
- Express Gavarion (エクスプレスギャバリオン, Ekusupuresu Gyabarion): A steam locomotive-themed spaceship combined with the Biccringer Ace-Go (ビックリンガー ACE-GO, Bikkuringā Ēsu Gō) spaceship. The miniature version of this Gavarion Unit can combine with a Gavarion Trigger to form the Gavarion Trigger EX (ギャバリオントリガー EX, Gyabarion Torigā Ī Ekkusu).

== Recurring characters ==
=== Multi-Earth Alpha 0073 ===
Multi-Earth Alpha 0073 (多元地球Α0073, Tagen Chikyū Arufa Maru Maru Nana San) is Earth of Reiji's universe. Reiji, Daisuke, Rikiya, and Patlan are contemporaries at the police academy.

==== Daisuke Date ====
Daisuke Date (伊達 大佐, Date Daisuke), nicknamed "Taisa" by Reiji, (Note: The kanji for his first name can be read as "taisa" (たいさ), which means colonel.) is a Cosmo Layers researcher and the chief of the Galaxy Federal Police Earth Branch Records Division.

Daisuke Date is portrayed by Arihiro Matsunaga (松永 有紘, Matsunaga Arihiro).

==== AGI ====
AGI (アギ, Agi; Artificial General Intelligence) is an autonomous artificial intelligence and all-purpose assistant created by Daisuke. While possessing a physical form like a human, she can transform her body into particles through the Laser Conversion (レーザーコンバージョン, Rēzā Konbājon) process.

AGI is portrayed by Kohana Arisaka (有坂 心花, Arisaka Kohana).

==== Rikiya Wanibuchi ====
Rikiya Wanibuchi (和仁淵 力哉, Wanibuchi Rikiya) is an elite investigator from the Galaxy Federal Police Earth Branch First Investigation Division.

Rikiya Wanibuchi is portrayed by Hiroto Yasuda (安田 啓人, Yasuda Hiroto).

==== Patlan ====
Patlan (パトラン, Patoran) is an alien from Planet Hyakuto (ヒャクトー星, Hyakutō-sei), an elite investigator from the Galaxy Federal Police Earth Branch First Investigation Division, and Rikiya's investigation partner.

Patlan is voiced by Takehito Koyasu (子安 武人, Koyasu Takehito).

==== Karel Qom Vigiles ====
Karel Qom Vigiles (カレル・コム・ウィギレス, Kareru Komu Wigiresu) is a being from the higher dimension who serves as the director of the Galaxy Federal Police Earth Branch Security Bureau who was involved in the establishment of the Records Division.

Karel Qom Vigiles is portrayed by Yūta Hiraoka (平岡 祐太, Hiraoka Yūta).

==== Taito Gato ====
Taito Gato (我藤 泰斗, Gatō Taito) is an investigator from the Galaxy Federal Police, Reiji's senior coworker, and Mikage's predecessor as Gavan who was murdered by Mikage three years before the series.

Taito Gato is portrayed by Takahiro Fujimoto (藤本 隆宏, Fujimoto Takahiro).

==== Supreme Chancellor ====
The Supreme Chancellor of the Galaxy Federal Police Supreme Council is a being from the higher dimension who serves as a top-ranking officer of the Galaxy Federal Police.

Supreme Chancellor is portrayed by Toshihiko Seki (関 俊彦, Seki Toshihiko).

==== Tesshin Mikage ====
Tesshin Mikage (御蔭 哲真, Mikage Tesshin) is a former Galaxy Federal Police investigator and Reiji's predecessor as Gavan who deserted and now serves an entity called Aza Zorth to cause destruction across the multiverse.

Similarly to the Space Sheriff Gavans, Mikage utilizes the Yuckamin Nega Emorgear in conjunction with a modified version of the Gavarion Trigger called the Gavarion Rifle (ギャバリオンライフル, Gyabarion Raifuru) to transform into the black-colored Death Gavan (デス・ギャバン, Desu Gyaban), formerly known as Space Sheriff Gavan Destiny (宇宙刑事ギャバン・デスティニー, Uchū Keiji Gyaban Desutinī). While transformed, he gains umbrakinesis. He also wields the Gavarion Blade (Dark Ver.) (ギャバリオンブレード (ダークver.), Gyabarion Burēdo (Dāku Bājon)) sword.

Tesshin Mikage is portrayed by Ray Fujita (藤田 玲, Fujita Rei).

===== Ark Gavarion =====
The Ark Gavarion (アークギャバリオン, Āku Gyabarion) is Death Gavan's spaceship that can travel through the Cosmo Layers and transform into a giant robot known as Ark Gavarion GC-R (アークギャバリオン GC-R, Āku Gyabarion Jī Shī Āru) when combined with the G-Mangader GC-R (Dark Ver.) (ジマンゲーダー GC-R (ダークver.), Jimangēdā Jī Shī Āru (Dāku Bājon)) spaceship. The Ark Gavarion can also combine with the Gavarion Units to form various Type combinations, which are as follows:

- Ark Gavarion Type Saber (アークギャバリオン タイプセイバー, Āku Gyabarion Taipu Seibā): A combination of the Ark Gavarion and Gavarion Saber (Dark Ver.) that can transform into Ark Gavarion 10Q (アークギャバリオン 10Q, Āku Gyabarion Ten Kyū).
- Ark Gavarion Type Drill (アークギャバリオン タイプドリル, Āku Gyabarion Taipu Doriru): A combination of the Ark Gavarion and Gavarion Drill (Dark Ver.) that can transform into Ark Gavarion WK-2 (アークギャバリオン WK-2, Āku Gyabarion Wāku Tsū).

====== Gavarion Units (Dark Ver.) ======
Death Gavan's personal versions of the Gavarion Units are a series of auxiliary spaceships that can combine with the Ark Gavarion.

- Gavarion Saber (Dark Ver.) (ギャバリオンセイバー (ダークver.), Gyabarion Seibā (Dāku Bājon)): A fighter jet-themed spaceship combined with the Onnikill 10Q (Dark Ver.) (オンニキール 10Q (ダークver.), On'nikīru Ten Kyū (Dāku Bājon)) spaceship.
- Gavarion Drill (Dark Ver.) (ギャバリオンドリル (ダークver.), Gyabarion Doriru (Dāku Bājon)): A tank-themed spaceship combined with the Shiritainder WK-2 (Dark Ver.) (シリタインダー WK-2 (ダークver.), Shiritaindā Wāku Tsū (Dāku Bājon)) spaceship.
- Gavarion Crane (Dark Ver.) (ギャバリオンクレーン (ダークver.), Gyabarion Kurēn (Dāku Bājon)): A crane vessel-themed spaceship combined with the Dejobdan &C (Dark Ver.) (デージョブダン &C (ダークver.), Dējobudan Ando Shī (Dāku Bājon)) spaceship.
- Gavarion Laser (Dark Ver.) (ギャバリオンレーザー (ダークver.), Gyabarion Rēzā (Dāku Bājon)): A satellite-themed spaceship combined with the Itosha G.I. (Dark Ver.) (イトオーシャ G.I. (ダークver.), Itoōsha Jī Ai (Dāku Bājon)) spaceship.

=== Multi-Earth Lambda 8018 ===
Multi-Earth Lambda 8018 (多元地球Λ8018, Tagen Chikyū Ramuda Hachi Maru Hito Hachi) is Earth of Setsuna's universe.

==== Rui Amo ====
Rui Amo (天羽 琉唯, Amō Rui) is the chief of the Galaxy Federal Police Public Security Headquarters Special Forces Unit and Setsuna's superior. She resembles the female alien Seoritsu (瀬織津) who gave Setsuna his name long ago.

Rui Amo is portrayed by Anna Iriyama (入山 杏奈, Iriyama An'na).

=== Multi-Earth Iota 5109 ===
Multi-Earth Iota 5109 (多元地球Ι5109, Tagen Chikyū Iota Go Hito Maru Kyū) is Earth of Kiki's universe.

==== Kotobuki Takanari ====
Kotobuki Takanari (高鳴 寿, Takanari Kotobuki), also known as "Koto" (コト), is a forensic investigator from the Galaxy Federal Police Forensics Division and Kiki's investigation partner. She and Kiki have been best friends since their high school days. When Kiki is injured by a criminal, Kotobuki accepts the responsibility of transforming into Space Sheriff Gavan Luminous in her place to save her, unaware that doing so causes Kiki to lose all her memories as a Space Sheriff Gavan while forgetting about her in the process until Reiji uses his Yamimakuru to restore Kiki's memories.

Kotobuki Takanari is portrayed by Lana Tanida (谷田 ラナ, Tanida Rana).

==== Yu Nusumi ====
Yu Nusumi (淳澄 幽, Nusumi Yū) is a self-proclaimed phantom thief, under the alias Phantom Thief Fade (怪盗フェイド, Kaitō Feido), who, despite his criminal endeavors, occasionally collaborates with Kiki and Kotobuki to solve Emorgear crimes. He also lives a simple life with his dementia-ridden grandmother Kyoko (郷子, Kyōko).

In battle, Yu wields the Emorgear Defroster (エモルギア解凍器, Emorugia Kaitōki) device, which allows him to amplify the power of Emorgears without the need for a Gavarion Trigger.

Yu Nusumi ia portrayed by Toru Isono (磯野 亨, Isono Tōru).

=== Multi-Earth Sigma 3302 ===
Multi-Earth Sigma 3302 (多元地球Σ3302, Tagen Chikyū Shiguma San San Maru Futa) is Earth of Arimoto's universe where insects can communicate with mankind and are part of society.

==== Mikuro Arimoto ====
Mikuro Arimoto (有本 未空朗, Arimoto Mikurō) is an intelligent ant and an investigator from the Galaxy Federal Police.

Due to his ant body, Arimoto's human investigation partner Shoko Hanemura utilizes the Maikka Emorgear in conjunction with the Gavarion Trigger to transform him into the brown-colored Space Sheriff Gavan Ameise (宇宙刑事ギャバン・アーマイゼ, Uchū Keiji Gyaban Āmaize). While transformed, he gains superhuman strength. He can also produce four miniature Gavarion Blades to use as a set of insect wings.

Mikuro Arimoto is voiced by Fumihiko Tachiki (立木 文彦, Tachiki Fumihiko).

==== Shoko Hanemura ====
Shoko Hanemura (羽村 翔子, Hanemura Shōko) is an investigator from the Galaxy Federal Police and Arimoto's investigation partner.

Shoko Hanemura is portrayed by Yui Watanabe (渡邉 結衣, Watanabe Yui).

=== Multi-Earth Zeta 2066 ===
Multi-Earth Zeta 2066 (多元地球Ζ2066, Tagen Chikyū Zēta Futa Maru Roku Roku) is Earth of Kunai's universe.

==== Derleth ====
Derleth (ダーレス, Dāresu) is the alien commander of the Galaxy Federal Police Interstellar Intelligence Division and Kunai's superior.

Derleth is portrayed by Ikki (イッキ).

==== Hatsune Kazanami ====
Hatsune Kazanami (風波 初音, Kazanami Hatsune) is an engineer and Kunai's younger sister. She researches the power of Yamimakuru and develops ninjutsu that allows anyone to travel between dimensions.

Hatsune Kazanami is portrayed by Maikichi (まいきち).

=== Multi-Earth Phi 5791 ===
Multi-Earth Phi 5791 (多元地球Φ5791, Tagen Chikū Fai Go Nana Kyū Hito) is Earth of Biccringer's universe where all of mankind discarded their physical bodies and uploaded their minds in a network server managed by robots, traveling across the solar system on space railways for amusement.

==== Biccringer ====
Biccringer (ビックリンガー, Bikkuringā) is an Emorgear-type robot conductor and inspector from the Space Railway (宇宙鉄道, Uchū Tetsudō).

Utilizing himself in conjunction with the Gavarion Trigger, Biccringer can transform into the humanoid Space Railway Sheriff Gavan Diagram (宇宙鉄道刑事ギャバン・ダイヤグラム, Uchū Tetsudō Keiji Gyaban Daiyaguramu). While transformed, he gains the ability to generate train tracks.

Biccringer is voiced by Junya Enoki (榎木 淳弥, Enoki Jun'ya).

=== Gavan Amigo ===
Gavan Amigo (ギャバン・アミーゴ, Gyaban Amīgo) is a robotic Space Sheriff Gavan from Multi-Earth Koppa 7207 (多元地球Ϙ7207, Tagen Chikū Koppa Nana Futa Maru Nana) who first appears in the web-exclusive series Super Space Sheriff Gavan Infinity: Supplementary Investigation: Off-Duty Gavan.

Gavan Amigo is voiced by Ayako Kawasumi, who also voices the Emorgears.

=== Aza Zoth ===
Aza Zoth (アザ・ゾルス, Aza Zorusu) is the ancient and mysterious entity behind Mikage's corruption and the main antagonist of the series, being the one behind the Emorgear criminals' rampage across parallel Earths. He is also the source of Reiji's ability to travel between dimensions.

=== Emorgear criminals ===
The Emorgear criminals use dark copies of the Emorgears called Nega Emorgears (ネガエモルギア, Nega Emorugia), which can open a portal to a different dimension known as the Makuu Space (魔空空間, Makū Kūkan), to carry out their crimes. The Nega Emorgears not only protect their users from the harmful effects of the Makuu Space, but also makes them stronger while fighting there.

- Goto (ゴート, Gōto): An alien from Planet Bodoro (惑星ボドロ, Wakusei Bodoro) and an armed robber from Multi-Earth Alpha 0073 who possesses the Mitchitari (ミッチターリ, Mitchitāri) Nega Emorgear. Portrayed by Danki Sakae (榮 男樹, Sakae Danki).
- Hitoshi Kuzumi (葛見 仁志, Kuzumi Hitoshi): A terrorist from Multi-Earth Lambda 8018 who possesses the Hazooi (ハズーイ, Hazūi) Nega Emorgear. Portrayed by Shodai Fukuyama (福山 翔大, Fukuyama Shōdai).
- Karasumaro (鴉麿): The boss of a criminal organization from Multi-Earth Lambda 8018 who possesses the Shinpader (シンペーダー, Shinpēdā) Nega Emorgear. Portrayed by Yuya Miyashita (宮下 雄也, Miyashita Yūya).
- Densu (デンス): An alien murderer from Multi-Earth Iota 5109 who possesses the Yoriso (ヨリソー, Yorisō) Nega Emorgear. Portrayed by Rei Saito (齋藤 礼, Saitō Rei).
- Shinji Daichi (大地 深治, Daichi Shinji): The leader of an armed group from Multi-Earth Sigma 3302 who possesses the Moikka Nega Emorgear. Portrayed by Suzuyuki Kaneko (金子 鈴幸, Kaneko Suzuyuki).
- Medel de Kattana (メデル・デ・カッターナ, Mederu De Kattāna): An alien from Planet Venke (惑星ヴェンケー, Wakusei Venkē) and an antique weapons dealer from Multi-Earth Lambda 8018 who possesses the Tokimeki Nega Emorgear. Portrayed by Takashi Kitadai (北代 高士, Kitadai Takashi).
- Dorimar (ドリマー, Dorimā): An alien from Planet Gibu (惑星ギブ, Wakusei Gibu) and a random attacker from Multi-Earth Alpha 0073 who possesses the Lonelyne Nega Emorgear. Portrayed by Ryotaro Ito (伊藤 凌太郎, Itō Ryōtarō).
- 999 (トリプルナイン, Toripuru Nain; Triple Nine): An artificial human of the same type as Setsuna and a sniper from Multi-Earth Lambda 8018 who possesses the Doushiyon Nega Emorgear. Portrayed by Kouta Shiomi (潮見 洸太, Shiomi Kōta).
- Rurugie (ルルギエ): The leader of the Galactic Association By Akbee (銀河結社バイ・アクベ, Ginga Kessha Bai Akube) from Multi-Earth Zeta 2066 who possesses the Kofunger Nega Emorgear. Portrayed by Riona Tatemichi (立道 梨緒奈, Tatemichi Riona).
- Goran (ゴーラン, Gōran): An alien from Planet Murumu (惑星ムルム, Wakusei Murumu) and a captor from Multi-Earth Lambda 8018 who possesses the Lonelyne Nega Emorgear. Portrayed by Jouji Shibue (渋江 譲二, Shibue Jōji).
- Reko (レーコ, Rēko): An alien from Planet Reiou (霊王星, Reiōsei) and a kidnapper from Multi-Earth Iota 5109 who possesses the Agar (アガール, Agāru) Nega Emorgear. Portrayed by Karin Tsuji (つじ かりん, Tsuji Karin).
- Hell Bomber (ヘルボマー, Heru Bomā): An alien bomber from Multi-Earth Alpha 0073 who possesses the Tsumanna Nega Emorgear. Portrayed by Takumi Nakatsugawa (中津川 巧, Nakatsugawa Takumi).
- 25 (25号, Nijū-go-gō): An artificial intelligence for controlling the Express Gavarion 25 and a train hijacker from Multi-Earth Phi 5791 who possesses the Scutt Nega Emorgear. Voiced by Kaori Takaoka (高岡 香, Takaoka Kaori).
- Yowaki (弱木): A mail-order customer from Multi-Earth Iota 5109 who possesses the Zaiark Nega Emorgear. Portrayed by Nao Nakanishi (中西 南央, Nakanishi Nao).
- Marian Toine (マリアン・トワネ): A marriage swindler from Multi-Earth Lambda 8018 who possesses the Happyque (ハッピーク, Happīku) Nega Emorgear. Portrayed by Bambi Naka (仲 万美, Naka Banbi).
- Versa Ille (ベルサ・イユ, Berusa Iyu): One of Marian's victims from Multi-Earth Lambda 8018 who possesses the Tokimeki Nega Emorgear. Portrayed by Amane Ito (伊藤 雨音, Itō Amane).
- Miya Sakaura (坂浦 美弥, Sakaura Miya): Kiki and Kotobuki's former teacher from Multi-Earth Iota 5109 who possesses the Moikka Nega Emorgear. Portrayed by Himena Tsukimiya (山田 姫奈, Tsukimiya Himena).

==== Other Emorgear criminals ====
- Renaldo (レナルド, Renarudo) and Judah (ジュダー, Judā): Two alien bus hijackers from Multi-Earth Alpha 0073. These Emorgear criminals appear exclusively in the film Super Space Sheriff Gavan Infinity: The Day the Sun Cried. Portrayed by Junpei Goto (後藤 淳平, Gotō Junpei) and Shusuke Fukutoku (福徳 秀介, Fukutoku Shūsuke) respectively.

=== Emons ===
The Emons (エモンズ, Emonzu) are monsters created when a Nega Emorgear is exposed to negative emotions.

- Pound (パウンド, Paundo): The first was created from the negative emotions of Hitoshi Kuzumi and destroyed by Space Sheriff Gavan Infinity, a second was created from the negative emotions of Karasumaro and destroyed by Space Sheriff Gavan Bushido, and a third was created from the negative emotions of an alien girl named Emu (エム) via the Yada Nega Emorgear and destroyed by Gavan Infinity.
- Tamashi (タマシー, Tamashī): Created from the negative emotions of Densu and destroyed by Space Sheriff Gavan Luminous.
- Grapple (グラップル, Gurappuru): The first was created from the negative emotions of Shinji Daichi and destroyed by Space Sheriff Gavan Ameise, a second was created from the negative emotions of 999 and destroyed by him, a third was created from the negative emotions of people and it along with its clones were thrown into the Makuu Space by Space Sheriff Gavan Luminous, a fourth was created from the negative emotions of Yowaki and destroyed by Space Sheriff Gavan Infinity, and a fifth was created from the negative emotions of Marian Towane and destroyed by Space Sheriff Gavan Bushido.
- Choke (チョーク, Chōku): The first was created from the negative emotions of Medel de Kattana and destroyed by Space Sheriff Gavan Infinity, a second was destroyed by Space Sheriff Gavan Bushido, and a third was created from the negative emotions of Goran and destroyed by Gavan Bushido.
- Ghost (ゴースト, Gōsuto): Created from the negative emotions of Reko and destroyed by Cosmo Gavarion Type Dornado.
- Grapple Pound (グラップルパウンド, Gurappuru Paundo): Created from the negative emotions of Hell Bomber and destroyed by Space Sheriff Gavan Infinity.
- Choke Grapple (チョークグラップル, Chōku Gurappuru): Created from the negative emotions of an unnamed Emorgear criminal and destroyed by Space Sheriff Gavan Infinity.
- Pound Choke (パウンドチョーク, Paundo Chōku): Created from the negative emotions of 25 and destroyed by Space Sheriff Gavan Infinity.
- Grapple Choke (グラップルチョーク, Gurappuru Chōku): Created from the negative emotions of Versa Ille and destroyed by Space Sheriff Gavan Infinity.
- Pound Grapple (パウンドグラップル, Paundo Gurappuru): Created from the negative emotions of Miya Sakaura and destroyed by Space Sheriff Gavan Luminous.

== Spin-off characters ==
- Makoto Hase (長谷 誠, Hase Makoto): A former Galaxy Federal Police investigator from Multi-Earth Alpha 0073 and Gato's former investigation partner who appears exclusively in the film Super Space Sheriff Gavan Infinity: The Day the Sun Cried. He can transform into Gavan Killer (ギャバンキラー, Gyaban Kirā). Portrayed by Tsutomu Takahashi (高橋 努, Takahashi Tsutomu).
