= Fukuzawa =

Fukuzawa (written: 福澤 or 福沢) is a Japanese surname. Notable people with the surname include:

- Hirofumi Fukuzawa (福沢 博文, born 1970), Japanese actor
- Fukuzawa Yukichi (福澤 諭吉, 1835–1901), Japanese writer, translator and journalist
- Momosuke Fukuzawa (福澤 桃介, 1868–1938), Japanese businessman
- Tatsuya Fukuzawa (福澤 達哉, born 1986), Japanese volleyball player
- Yoshimitsu Fukuzawa (福沢 義光, born 1963), Japanese golfer
