= List of Kamen Rider Geats episodes =

This is a list of episodes for Kamen Rider Geats, a Japanese tokusatsu television drama. It is the fourth series in the franchise released in Japan's Reiwa Era and the 33rd entry of Toei's long-running Kamen Rider series produced by TV Asahi.

The episodes are divided into arcs that correspond to an individual Desire Grand Prix (DGP) tournament.

All of the episodes were written by Yuya Takahashi.

== Episodes ==
| No. | Title | Directed by | Original release date |
|---|---|---|---|
| 1 | "Daybreak F: Inviting You to Be a Rider"; Transliteration: "Reimei Efu: Raidā e no Shōtaijō" (Japanese: 黎明F：ライダーへの招待状) | Shojiro Nakazawa | September 4, 2022 |
Mysterious monsters attack the city as individuals chosen as Kamen Riders are assembled to fight them in a competition known as the Desire Grand Prix (DGP), where the winner gets their wish granted. Two of them are Ace Ukiyo, who can transform into the foxlike Kamen Rider Geats, and Michinaga Azuma, who can transform into the buffalo-like Kamen Rider Buffa. Job-hunting university student Keiwa Sakurai and rich social influencer Neon Kurama are caught in the competition's battle but survive the event. The winner of the game is Ace.
| 2 | "Encounter I: Treasure Hunts and Bandits"; Transliteration: "Kaikō Wan: Takara Sagashi to Tōzoku" (Japanese: 邂逅I：宝さがしと盗賊) | Shojiro Nakazawa | September 11, 2022 |
Keiwa, Neon, and many others are chosen to participate in the new DGP. Among the participants are Takahito Taira, the director of an IT company who interviewed Keiwa during his failed job-hunting, and Ace and Michinaga. These returning veterans saved Keiwa and Neon from the previous competition. As the first round of the DGP starts, Taira is killed by a Jyamato and dies in Keiwa's arms, but Ace fulfills his wish to save his sickly son.
| 3 | "Encounter II: Zombie Hunt"; Transliteration: "Kaikō Tsū: Zonbi Gari" (Japanese: 邂逅II：ゾンビ狩り) | Teruaki Sugihara | September 18, 2022 |
Following Taira's death, Keiwa's trauma further increases during the first round of the new competition. Concurrently, while trying to escape her strict mother, Neon meets Ace and asks him to guest star on her livestream. However, as Neon's show is interrupted, the second bout of the "Encounter" DGP suddenly begins. Elsewhere, Michinaga and Kanato Sumida form an unlikely alliance before the latter attempts to turn Neon into a zombie by having a Zombie Jyamato attack her. His plan succeeds, but he is also bitten as a result.
| 4 | "Encounter III: Victory Conditions"; Transliteration: "Kaikō Surī: Shōri Jōken" (Japanese: 邂逅III：勝利条件) | Teruaki Sugihara | September 25, 2022 |
With Neon infected by the Zombie Jyamato amidst a Zombie Survival-themed round of the DGP, her mother deletes her videos. Meanwhile, Kanato uses his immunity to the Zombie Jyamato to freely attack his competitors, but this results in him being attacked by them before he is disqualified for breaking the rules.
| 5 | "Encounter IV: Doubles Concentration"; Transliteration: "Kaikō Fō: Duo Shinkeisuijaku" (Japanese: 邂逅IV：デュオ神経衰弱) | Takayuki Shibasaki | October 2, 2022 |
Keiwa helps cure Neon and help her live a more normal life. Meanwhile, in response to Kanato's disqualification, the mysterious and silent Kamen Rider PunkJack replaces him to accompany Morio Koganeya for the teamwork round at the DGP admins' behest. However, Morio abandons Punk Jack in favor of Michinaga, whose past, reasoning for his rivalry with Ace, distrust towards Kamen Riders, and participation in the DGP are revealed.
| 6 | "Encounter V: The Boost Counterattack"; Transliteration: "Kaikō Faibu: Gyakuten no Būsuto" (Japanese: 邂逅V：逆転のブースト) | Takayuki Shibasaki | October 9, 2022 |
As Morio believes his odds of winning the teamwork round have improved with Michinaga as his partner and gradually reveals his true duplicitous nature, Keiwa trains with PunkJunk. Ultimately, Ace and Neon take first place while Michinaga abandons Morio for Keiwa, his original partner, to take second place. Due to getting the lowest score, Morio and PunkJack are eliminated.
| 7 | "Encounter VI: A Last Boss and Kick the Can"; Transliteration: "Kaikō Shikkusu: Rasubosu to Kankeri" (Japanese: 邂逅VI：ラスボスと缶けり) | Kazuya Kamihoriuchi | October 16, 2022 |
Only Ace, Keiwa, Neon, and Michinaga remain as the DGP's final round commences, with the fate of the world resting on a variation of "kick the can" that includes the most powerful Jyamato they have ever faced yet as the final boss. Along the way, Ace reveals tidbits of his origins and allows Keiwa to get hurt so he can acquire stronger Rider powers.
| 8 | "Encounter VII: The Secret Weapon Ninja"; Transliteration: "Kaikō Sebun: Kirifuda Ninja" (Japanese: 邂逅VII：切り札ニンジャ) | Kazuya Kamihoriuchi | October 23, 2022 |
Keiwa's older sister, Sara, has been kidnapped by a Knight Jyamato. Despite his injuries, Keiwa is motivated by Ace to not give up on saving Sara while Ace apologizes to Keiwa for using him. After finding Sara, the four surviving Riders transform in front of her. While Keiwa protects Sara, her hand accidentally touches her brother's ID Core, revealing to them that their parents were killed during a previous DGP.
| 9 | "Encounter F: Wake Up! Monster"; Transliteration: "Kaikō Efu: Weiku Appu! Monsutā" (Japanese: 邂逅F：Wake up！モンスター) | Shojiro Nakazawa | October 30, 2022 |
Keiwa narrowly wins "kick the can", but is ultimately eliminated due to his injuries. With Ace, Neon, and Michinaga left, they learn their final challenge is hatching eggs. Ace's desire to win and continue fighting slowly grows as the competition gets underway, having been inspired to carry Keiwa's wish to protect world peace.
| 10 | "Conspiracy I: Beat of the New World"; Transliteration: "Bōryaku Wan: Shin Sekai no Bīto" (Japanese: 謀略I：新世界のビート) | Shojiro Nakazawa | November 13, 2022 |
Ace’s wish of having Girori and Tsumuri as his family is granted, which Tsumuri finds "unacceptable". He and Michinaga return for the new DGP tournament with Neon after she unexpectedly receives permission from her father Kōsei. The three soon learn that they have been joined by a mysterious guitarist named Win Hareruya, who reveals himself as the true identity of PunkJack. Concurrently, Girori is secretly revealed to be the DGP's masked Game Master as he privately entrusts Win with important tasks.
| 11 | "Conspiracy II: The Jyamato Labyrinth"; Transliteration: "Bōryaku Tsū: Jamato no Meikyū" (Japanese: 謀略II：ジャマトの迷宮) | Teruaki Sugihara | November 20, 2022 |
The next round of the "Conspiracy" DGP sees the players helping four collared vine-covered civilians, including Keiwa, escape a Jyamato labyrinth and fighting Jyamato which have obtained the means to transform into a stronger Kamen Rider-esque form. Amid competition, the players soon learn that the monsters can strangle their captives with the vines if they get too close. Concurrently, the DGP's organizers secretly plot to eliminate Ace in retaliation for his winning streak. At the same time, a mysterious gardener named Archimedel cultivates more Jyamato from his hidden garden and feeds them dead DGP players' ID Cores.
| 12 | "Conspiracy III: Slot★Fever"; Transliteration: "Bōryaku Surī: Surotto Fībā" (Japanese: 謀略III：スロット★フィーバー) | Teruaki Sugihara | November 27, 2022 |
As the players struggle to decipher a code that will let them escape a mansion and save the captured civilians from the Jyamato Riders, Win tries to give Michinaga tips on how to outwit Ace while finding their escape. Meanwhile, knowing Keiwa will not survive the Jyamato Riders without his memories from the previous tournament, Ace asks him to touch the former's Desire Driver to restore them, leading to Keiwa eventually finding his own Desire Driver and returning to the DGP.
| 13 | "Conspiracy IV: Retrieve the Drivers!"; Transliteration: "Bōryaku Fō: Doraibā o Dakkan Seyo!" (Japanese: 謀略IV：ドライバーを奪還せよ！) | Koichi Sakamoto | December 4, 2022 |
Keiwa rejoins the DGP after new player Ittetsu Tanba voluntarily gives up his place in the tournament to him and becomes motivated to revive those who have died in previous DGPs. However, he and the remaining players discover a mysterious woman in a white dress and red hat has stolen their Desire Drivers and given them to the Jyamato, forcing them to regain them quickly lest they risk getting disqualified.
| 14 | "Conspiracy V: A Furious Glare"; Transliteration: "Bōryaku Faibu: Ikari no Gurea" (Japanese: 謀略V：怒りのグレア) | Koichi Sakamoto | December 11, 2022 |
Ace and Win compete to reclaim their Drivers back from a Jyamato Rider, with a pleased Girori confident that Ace will finally lose. Michinaga fights to claim his form of victory over Ace, while Neon discovers her family's company has been sponsoring the DGP for generations and her bodyguards are former DGP players. Meanwhile, the mysterious woman reveals herself as a disguised Jyamato, whom Keiwa eventually kills. When Win fails him, Giroli breaks the rules to become Kamen Rider Glare, brainwashing Win to personally eliminate Ace from the DGP.
| 15 | "Conspiracy VI: The Right to Be a Kamen Rider"; Transliteration: "Bōryaku Shikkusu: Kamen Raidā no Shikaku" (Japanese: 謀略VI：仮面ライダーの資格) | Koichi Sakamoto | December 18, 2022 |
Following Ace's disqualification, Keiwa, Neon, and Michinaga struggle to win the "Conspiracy" tournament and potentially become the new Dezashin. As Michinaga is fatally injured in the ensuing chaos, Ace manages to return to the battlefield with the help of notes he had left around his room in case he lost his memories. A dying Michinaga gives Ace his Desire Driver so he can regain his memories, single-handedly defeat the Jyamato, win the final round, expose Girori, and reveal the DGP's connections to the Jyamato and Neon's family. Nevertheless, Girori refuses to accept this and rigs the tournament by adding a new final round.
| 16 | "Conspiracy IR: The Fox Hunt"; Transliteration: "Bōryaku Ai Āru: Kitsune Gari" (Japanese: 謀略IR：キツネ狩り) | Shojiro Nakazawa | December 25, 2022 |
Refusing to allow Ace to be declared the winner of the "Conspiracy" tournament, Girori sets up a new playoff round where either Keiwa or Neon could win if one of them kills Ace. While both are reluctant, Girori uses their desires to blackmail them into obeying him. Despite Girori's best efforts and turning Win into a suicide bomber, Keiwa and Neon play along until they can expose Girori's illegal actions during a broadcast, allowing the DGP's producer, Niramu, to officially fire him. Meanwhile, Michinaga's body ends up in Archimedel's greenhouse.
| 17 | "Divergence I: Welcome to the New Season!"; Transliteration: "Kairi Wan: Yōkoso! Shin Shīzun e!" (Japanese: 乖離I：ようこそ！新シーズンへ！) | Shojiro Nakazawa | January 8, 2023 |
As a new DGP gets underway under the direction of a new Game Master, Chirami, to replace the disgraced Girori, Ace, Keiwa, and Neon are joined by two new participants, Daichi Isuzu and Sae Ganaha. Ace intends to use the wish he will win in this tournament to become the new Game Master, but new rules tailored to limit his power become known, such as viewers voting to determine the winner of a round and the players having to identify and eliminate a player designated as the "Dezastar" before they automatically win the tournament. Meanwhile, Michinaga awakens in Archimedel's garden, having been resurrected by his constant use of the Zombie Buckle. Concurrently, the Jyamato have evolved, gaining the ability to mimic fallen players' appearances.
| 18 | "Divergence II: Bravo! Jyamar Ball Battle!"; Transliteration: "Kairi Tsū: Burabō! Jamā Bōru Taiketsu!" (Japanese: 乖離II：ブラボー！ジャマーボール対決！) | Teruaki Sugihara | January 15, 2023 |
The five competing Riders must team up against a Jyamato team in the tournament's ball-themed second round, "Jyamar Ball". In the middle of the match, however, Keiwa is suddenly accused of being a traitor and the Dezastar, resulting in his Ninja Buckle being confiscated. Nevertheless, he completes a Secret Mission and receives the Command Twin Buckle as a reward, though he can only use it for short periods. Privately, Keiwa struggles to believe that the Jyamato are fallen players. Meanwhile, Michinaga escapes Archimedel, and a group of Jyamato is sent to find him before he can reveal their hive. In the process, he steals a Jyamato Buckle and uses it to defend himself, only to learn that it has a detrimental effect on him.
| 19 | "Divergence III: Time to Vote! Who's the Dezastar?!"; Transliteration: "Kairi Surī: Tōhyō! Dezasutā wa Dare da!" (Japanese: 乖離III：投票！デザスターは誰だ！) | Teruaki Sugihara | January 22, 2023 |
While on the run from his Jyamato pursuers, Michinaga is unable to tell Ace where the monsters come from, but uses his Jyamato Buckle to hint at their source. Meanwhile, despite being the most unpopular player in the DGP, Keiwa tries to save a group of children who got caught in the middle of the Jyamar Ball match and win the round.
| 20 | "Divergence IV: Jyamato Deliveries!"; Transliteration: "Kairi Fō: Jamato kara no Takuhaibin!" (Japanese: 乖離IV：ジャマトからの宅配便！) | Kyohei Yamaguchi | January 29, 2023 |
Following Daichi's elimination from the tournament and confirmation that he is not the Dezastar, the remaining players must find fruit-shaped time bombs hidden by the Jyamato and identify the Dezastar in the next round. However, Keiwa's anxiety worsens while Michinaga's use of his Jyamato Buckle gradually takes his humanity. Meanwhile, Keiwa's older sister Sara gets caught in the crossfire of the DGP after unknowingly being sent a pineapple-shaped bomb from a Bomber Jyamato, though she is saved from it. After Sae learns the Sakurais lost their parents, she is reminded of her father's passing and reaffirms her desire to support her remaining family. Concurrently, Ace Ukiyo fan and sponsor Ziin is unexpectedly visited by Beroba, a Jyamato sponsor who has chosen to sponsor Michinaga.
| 21 | "Divergence V: Gazer's Judgment!"; Transliteration: "Kairi Faibu: Geizā no Tettsui!" (Japanese: 乖離V：ゲイザーの鉄槌！) | Kyohei Yamaguchi | February 5, 2023 |
Sae is revealed as the Dezastar and must secretly kill her competitors. She proves reluctant until she learns her family has been taken hostage. She and her fellow players attempt to rescue them, but Michinaga goes berserk once again and reveals his reasoning for joining the Jyamato, taking the Zombie Buckle back from her with help from Beroba, who also seeks to obliterate all of the DGP's Riders with help from Daichi, who has secretly allied with her to get back into the tournament. Ace tells Niramu what has happened, leading to the latter transforming into Kamen Rider Gazer to ensure the official competitors can complete their missions unimpeded. However, Michinaga's Zombie Buckle allows him to temporarily escape death. After Neon saves her family and in light of everything that has happened, Sae privately confides in her that she knows Neon is the real Dezastar, but allowed herself to become a scapegoat, before resigning from the DGP to focus on supporting her family.
| 22 | "Divergence VI: Pursuit! Time to Catch Chirami!"; Transliteration: "Kairi Shikkusu: Tsuiseki! Chirami-oni o Tsukamaero!" (Japanese: 乖離VI：追跡！チラミ鬼をつかまえろ！) | Shojiro Nakazawa | February 12, 2023 |
Due to the Jyamato not appearing in the latest round, the DGP's producers fear their ratings will decline and make the Riders compete in a modified form of tag wherein they must capture Chirami, who reveals he was forced to become the Game Master before running away. by Beroba, Daichi, Archimedel, and Michinaga gather at the Jyamar Garden to formulate a new plan. Unbeknownst to them, Ziin discovers the Jyamato's true plan and decides to take action. Neon fears her status as the Dezastar will involve sacrificing her desire, but Ace, Keiwa, and a mysterious man learn of her troubles, with the stranger warning her of the danger of being the Dezastar.
| 23 | "Divergence T: Now, for the Sake of My Favorite!"; Transliteration: "Kairi Tī: Iza! Oshi no Tame nara" (Japanese: 乖離T：いざ！推しのためなら) | Shojiro Nakazawa | February 19, 2023 |
The Jyamato force Chirami to become a boss in the tournament instead of one of their own so they can steal his Vision Driver and use it to seek out the Creation Goddess for their ends. However, they learn from Niramu that the goddess only grants the tournament winner's wish with permission from a high-ranking DGP member. Meanwhile, the DGP gets canceled, saving Neon from being officially revealed as the Dezastar, while Chirami is punished for his incompetence and allowing the incident to happen. As Neon meets the stranger, Kyuun, the DGP players, and Ziin gain Niramu's help in invading the Jyamar Garden to retrieve Chirami's Vision Driver and reinstate the DGP. Throughout the fight, both sides learn the DGP can be watched across time and space, the Supporter Riders are from a distant future, and parts of the Jyamar Garden were areas from previous seasons that past players failed to protect. Shortly after, Beroba destroys the Jyamar Garden, to Archimedel's dismay, while Niramu calmly prepares for the series finale.
| 24 | "Divergence SP: Emergency Special! Behind the DGP!"; Transliteration: "Kairi Esu Pī: Kinkyū Tokuban! Dezagura no Subete!" (Japanese: 乖離SP：緊急特番！デザグラのすべて！) | Shojiro Nakazawa | February 26, 2023 |
Despite losing the Jyamar Garden, the Jyamato escapes to find a new hideout. Meanwhile, due to technical difficulties, the DGP's producers hastily create a "special episode" for the viewers in which they will seemingly reveal the tournament's secrets, such as the history of past seasons, including Ace's presumed first time participating. However, Beroba hijacks the broadcast to announce the creation of the "Jyamato Grand Prix" (JGP) and a Jyamato invasion. As the players fight to save civilians once more, the supporters set their sights on Beroba herself.
| 25 | "Lamentation I: The Jyamato Grand Prix"; Transliteration: "Dōkoku Wan: Jamato Guran Puri♡" (Japanese: 慟哭I：ジャマトグランプリ♡) | Takayuki Shibasaki | March 5, 2023 |
When Michinaga enters the JGP, his best friend, Tōru Imai, who was killed during a previous season, seemingly appears before him and asks to work together to make his dream come true. However, he is later revealed to be a Jyamato mimicking Tōru. Shortly afterward, the JGP's first round, the "Lightning Jyamato Festival" begins. Despite not being able to become the Dezashin even if they win, Ace, Keiwa, and Neon cannot overlook the Jyamato attacking people and take the fight to them and Michinaga. Meanwhile, in response to the JGP's creation, the Kurama Group deploys officers to protect civilians from the Jyamato and reveal the monsters' existence to the world. Amidst an argument between them, Kōsei reveals Neon did not exist until he wished it so after receiving a wish from the DGP in exchange for sponsoring them.
| 26 | "Lamentation II: The Crimson Boost!"; Transliteration: "Dōkoku Tsū: Shinku no Būsuto!" (Japanese: 慟哭II：真紅のブースト！) | Takayuki Shibasaki | March 12, 2023 |
As the Jyamato attempt to construct a lightning generator powerful enough to level a town, Keiwa and Neon are severely injured by Michinaga. Ace is left standing but is overwhelmed by Michinaga and the Jyamato until he unexpectedly receives four more Boost Raise Buckles from the Creation Goddess, which he uses to create the Boost Buckle Mark II and kill the Cactus Knight Jyamato who mimicked Tōru. Having learned the truth, Michinaga leaves the Jyamato to die and withdraws from the second round. At the end of the first round, Niramu reviews four of Ace’s previous wishes, all of which ask for the power to save the world in one of his future lives.
| 27 | "Lamentation III: Fun with the Sengoku Game"; Transliteration: "Dōkoku Surī: Tanoshii Sengoku Gēmu♡" (Japanese: 慟哭III：たのしい戦国ゲーム♡) | Koichi Sakamoto | March 19, 2023 |
The next round of the JGP takes place in the Sengoku period, where the DGP players must protect the Vision Driver from the Jyamato once more. Meanwhile, Ziin and Niramu discuss the Creation Goddess's connections to Ace's reincarnations and why she gave him the Boost Mark II Buckle.
| 28 | "Lamentation IV: A Laser-Boosted Relationship!"; Transliteration: "Dōkoku Fō: Kizuna no Rēzā Būsuto!" (Japanese: 慟哭IV：絆のレーザーブースト！) | Koichi Sakamoto | March 26, 2023 |
Ace finds himself in trouble due to the Boost Mark II Buckle's side effects, but narrowly survives with Keiwa and Neon's help. Having witnessed what happened, Ziin becomes hurt before Ace tells him about his life. Meanwhile, Niramu participates directly in the current tournament, with Ace and the others as bodyguards. The round soon culminates in Beroba using the Vision Driver to become Kamen Rider Glare2 and facing Ace in single combat. With help from Ziin, Ace uses the former's Laser Raise Riser to access another new form, stabilize the Boost Mark II Buckle's power, and defeat Beroba. However, Michinaga retrieves the Vision Driver to enact his endgame.
| 29 | "Lamentation V: Surprise! The Bullfighting Game"; Transliteration: "Dōkoku Faibu: Sapuraizu! Tōgyū Gēmu♡" (Japanese: 慟哭V：サプライズ！闘牛ゲーム♡) | Teruaki Sugihara | April 2, 2023 |
In flashbacks, Kōsei and Irumi's young daughter, Akari, was kidnapped and murdered in a failed attempt at ransoming them. After agreeing to sponsor the DGP and receiving a wish in return, a grieving, guilt-ridden Kōsei used it to create Neon in Akari's likeness. In the present, on Neon's birthday, Michinaga uses the Vision Driver he stole to establish a one-on-one fight with Ace in the JGP's next round. However, Beroba has her plans for the round, which involves revealing the truth behind Neon's existence.
| 30 | "Lamentation VI: The Prince from the Letters"; Transliteration: "Dōkoku Shikkusu: Tegami no Naka no Ōjisama" (Japanese: 慟哭VI：手紙の中の王子様) | Teruaki Sugihara | April 9, 2023 |
As Neon becomes devastated by the truth behind her existence, Ace acquires assistance from her supporter, Kyuun, to help her overcome it and move forward. Meanwhile, despite the round ending in a draw, the Jyamato looked into the Vision Driver's archives. In the process, they discover Ace's lost mother, Mitsume, was chosen to become the Creation Goddess.
| 31 | "Lamentation VII: The Heaven and Hell Game"; Transliteration: "Dōkoku Sebun: Tengoku to Jigoku Gēmu♡" (Japanese: 慟哭VII：天国と地獄ゲーム♡) | Ryuta Tasaki | April 16, 2023 |
Neon goes on hiatus from the JGP, leaving Ace and Keiwa. The final round of the JGP begins as a section of the city gets separated and floats into the air, with trapped innocents being corralled by the Jyamato into colored circles, some of which will send them plummeting to the ground if they choose incorrectly. Incensed by this and the JGP's rules, Ace and Keiwa confront Beroba, who claims that this is the "epitome of the world". Meanwhile, Ace's search for Mitsume leads him to the truth behind what happened to her.
| 32 | "Lamentation F: Final Judgment"; Transliteration: "Dōkoku Efu: Saigo no Shinpan" (Japanese: 慟哭F：最後の審判) | Ryuta Tasaki | April 23, 2023 |
With Keiwa eliminated, Ace is the only DGP Rider left as he engages Michinaga in a duel for the Vision Driver to end the JGP and reunite with his mother. Ziin then returns to remind Ace of how the DGP originally operated and reveals that Mitsume opposed the DGP's reformat into its current incarnation and was turned into the Creation Goddess by the organization's leader Suel when she refused to participate willingly. A vengeful Ace attacks Niramu in response before they fall into a trap set by Beroba, leaving Michinaga the winner of the JGP as he uses his wish to revive dead Jyamato while giving them and himself the power to destroy the Kamen Riders.
| 33 | "Longing I: The Invincible Buffa!"; Transliteration: "Bojō Wan: Baffa Musō!" (Japanese: 慕情I：バッファ無双！) | Shojiro Nakazawa | April 30, 2023 |
As the winner of the JGP, Michinaga resets the world and Neon lives her days in peace with no memory of her days as a Kamen Rider while Ace, Keiwa, and Niramu have gone missing. Michinaga starts a new game where he hunts down Kamen Riders, with Neon regaining her memory while her bodyguards briefly regain their Kamen Rider status before Michinaga breaks their ID Cores and eliminates them permanently. Chirami and Ziin decide to challenge Michinaga to bring Ace and the others back. Michinaga overpowers the two before Ace is revived when Tsumuri awakens a power similar to Mitsume's while praying for Ace's return. Ace declares war on the DGP while Suel observes as the events unfold.
| 34 | "Longing II: The Wrath of Geats"; Transliteration: "Bojō Tsū: Gītsu no Hokosaki" (Japanese: 慕情II：ギーツの矛先) | Shojiro Nakazawa | May 7, 2023 Following his revival, Ace decides to strike back at the DGP for taking away his mother and weakens Chirami enough for Michinaga to kill him. Suel responds by inviting the two men to his new competition, a second season of the Desire Royale where they can fight each other and the other Kamen Riders. Suel claims that the winner will decide the fate of the DGP, but adds a rule that those who get eliminated can never become Kamen Riders again. Concurrently, Keiwa's supporter, Kekera, approaches Beroba with a deal to revive Keiwa and then convinces Keiwa’s sister Sara to become Kamen Rider Hakubi to lure Keiwa back into the tournament. |
| 35 | "Longing III: A Sister's Wish, a Brother's Wish"; Transliteration: "Bojō Surī: Ane no Negai, Otōto no Negai" (Japanese: 慕情III：姉の願い、弟の願い) | Hirofumi Fukuzawa | May 14, 2023 |
Suel sets up a new round where whoever collects the most lost ID Cores from Jyamato is granted elimination privileges. Meanwhile, Keiwa is displeased by Kekera's scheme of involving Sara in the tournament. Neon, concerned over Ace and Michinaga trying to destroy the DGP despite their ongoing feud, proposes an alliance with Sara to stop them. Daichi exploits the girls' alliance to use them as sacrificial pawns in distracting Michinaga, who learns of his scheme and eliminates him while Ace warns Neon and Sara not to interfere in their war with the DGP. However, the Dunkleosteus Jyamato "Archimedel" grabs Daichi's broken ID Core before Michinaga can destroy it. Tsumuri is then approached by Niramu and a resurrected Win Hareruya, the former revealing his intent to retake the DGP and quickly move it to another period rather than taking part in their superior's grand scheme.
| 36 | "Longing IV: A Fleeting Alliance"; Transliteration: "Bojō Fō: Karisome no Kyōtō" (Japanese: 慕情IV：かりそめの共闘) | Hirofumi Fukuzawa | May 21, 2023 |
With the returning Jyamato taking advantage of Michinaga's wish to overpower him, Ace approaches Michinaga with an offer of an alliance to deal with the Jyamato "Archimedel". Meanwhile, the DGP staff starts to make their move into reclaiming control of the world. Despite revealing to have survived Girori's previous attempt, a fully recovered Win remains to help Ace behind the scenes alongside Tsumuri.
| 37 | "Longing V: Pure White Oblivion"; Transliteration: "Bojō Faibu: Junpaku no Hakai" (Japanese: 慕情V：純白の破壊) | Teruaki Sugihara | May 28, 2023 |
Although Archimedel's legacy has ended, the Desire Royale goes into overtime as Michinaga confronts Neon and the Sakurai siblings before attacking Keiwa after Sara and Neon are eliminated. Ace learns the Desire Royale is a distraction the DGP are using to escape into another period to start anew, and uses the Vision Driver he got from Ziin to confront Suel with Niramu standing in his way. Win and Tsumuri uncover the circumstances behind Ace's birth by researching documents dating back to before the Common Era, revealing his birth father was a Dezashin whose identity was erased from all DGP records for falling in love with Mitsume. Though Ace's rage initially places him at a disadvantage against Niramu, it allows him to awaken a new power as he manifests the ability to become Geats Boost Form Mark III.
| 38 | "Longing F: The Nine-Tailed White Fox!"; Transliteration: "Bojō Efu: Kyūbi no Shirogitsune!" (Japanese: 慕情F：九尾の白狐！) | Teruaki Sugihara | June 4, 2023 |
Despite obtaining his new power and form, Ace fails to reach his mother and finds himself in a strange dimension where he is approached by a mysterious man in a fox mask who resembles himself. Meanwhile, the Desire Royale's finale continues as the supporters say their goodbyes while Kekera and Beroba cash in on their wishes to remain in the present without fear of dying. Keiwa attempts to stop the DGP from leaving as Suel has Niramu executed by Samasu for defying his intention of abandoning Mitsume and making Tsumuri her replacement as the next Creation Goddess. Suel uses the Vision Driver to become a variant of Gazer and commence the Grand End, intentionally erasing everything rather than just traces of DGP from the present era. A dying Mitsume uses her last will to unlock Ace's full potential, granting him the power of Kamen Rider Geats IX. Ace defeats Suel's Gazer and restores all lost memories of the DGP, making its existence public knowledge.
| 39 | "Creation I: My DGP"; Transliteration: "Sōsei Wan: Ore no Dezagura" (Japanese: 創世I：俺のデザグラ) | Takayuki Shibasaki | June 11, 2023 |
With surviving Jyamato hiding themselves as miniature parasites that can infect civilians and infiltrate society to cause chaos, along with Kekera and Beroba remaining to oversee their wards, Ace, Win, and Tsumuri recruit Keiwa and Michinaga for a friendly contest Ace has created to deal with the troublemakers. It is revealed that Daichi has abandoned his humanity to become a Jyamato himself and has taken over Archimedel's legacy of further evolving the Jyamato so their existence does not go against the laws Ace created for the world. Furthermore, Suel sends a new Game Master, Zitt, to the present era to retrieve Tsumuri. As a consequence of the DGP being public knowledge, Kōsei is arrested for bribery and conspiracy involving the DGP. Neon is able to find an apartment with Sara’s help before the former got caught up in the scandal.
| 40 | "Creation II: Tycoon Unleashed"; Transliteration: "Sōsei Tsū: Taikūn Kakusei" (Japanese: 創世II：タイクーン覚醒) | Takayuki Shibasaki | June 18, 2023 |
With help from Kekera and Beroba, Keiwa and Michinaga return to their Rider duties to join Ace in stopping the parasite Jyamato's widespread infections on civilians caused by Daichi. After Kōsei's arrest, Neon reconciles with her mother. Kekera and Beroba remain up to something sinister after being given by Zitt their respective black Raise Riser Cards, the King and Queen Jyamato Cards. Kekera and Beroba have Daichi kidnap Sara when she uncovers his parasite Jyamato, and make her the host of a next-stage variant that cannot be removed. Michinaga ends up killing Sara by mistake during the resulting fight and Keiwa falls into despair as his new form, Bujin Sword appears right side before him.
| 41 | "Creation III: The Jet-Black Shogun"; Transliteration: "Sōsei Surī: Shikkoku no Shōgun" (Japanese: 創世III：漆黒の将軍) | Koichi Sakamoto | June 25, 2023 |
Daichi, Kekera, and Beroba exploit Sara's supposed death to play Keiwa and Michinaga into killing each other. Feeling responsible for being unable to prevent Sara's death, Ace informs Neon about what happened, shortly before Daichi announces an invasion of a newly formed Jyamato cult. Unbeknownst to the five main players and Tsumuri, those who were infected by “wave two” parasite Jyamato, including Sara, will have their bodies transported to Daichi's Jyamar Garden and entrapped them inside a tree that absorbs their life force. Ace and Win have their hands full protecting Tsumuri from Zitt and trust her safety to Keiwa, who is compelled by his hate-filled thoughts to have Tsumuri create him a new Raise Buckle to use on Michinaga.
| 42 | "Creation IV: A Goddess Perfected and the Blade of the Darkness"; Transliteration: "Sōsei Fō: Megami Kasei Yami no Yaiba" (Japanese: 創世IV：女神完成 闇の刃) | Koichi Sakamoto | July 2, 2023 |
Keiwa's sanity has begun to slip since Sara's presumed death and acquiring the Bujin Sword Raise Buckle, becoming a DGP pawn in kidnapping Tsumuri. After Keiwa ultimately decides to spare him from his wrath, Michinaga discovers that Kekera and Beroba are helping Daichi behind the recent parasite Jyamato incident. While leading his Jyamato cult, Daichi is attacked by Keiwa for his role in causing the events that led to Sara's presumed death at Michinaga's hands. Overpowered and fearing death, Daichi is abandoned by Kekera to be killed by Keiwa in cold blood. A concerned Ace stops Keiwa before he goes too far. Although Zitt transformed her into a Creation Goddess, Tsumuri's transformation is incomplete because of her desire to stay with Ace and help him. In the end, Ace watches Keiwa's granted wish from afar but realizes there is something wrong with it.
| 43 | "Creation V: His Name Is Gya-Go!"; Transliteration: "Sōsei Faibu: Sono Na wa Gyāgo!" (Japanese: 創世V：その名はギャーゴ！) | Teruaki Sugihara | July 9, 2023 |
Keiwa's wish to revive those who died in the previous DGPs and bring back the people trapped in the Tree of Knowledge is granted, but this leads to revived villainous Kamen Riders rampaging across the city, with Keiwa’s sister and parents getting caught in the crossfire. Beroba and Kekera exploit Keiwa’s anguish to establish a Post-Apocalypse Game, a Purge-like game between heroic and villainous Riders, to entertain themselves in the resulting chaos. Keiwa kills his family's murderer, Kirito Asari, and takes over his gang as a consequence while Michinaga interrogates a hospitalized Daichi, who reveals that Sara could have been revived before Keiwa’s wish changed the world. Despite being powerless, Neon helps Kōsei escape when they are attacked by Kazuo Numabukuro, the criminal who murdered Akari and has been recruited by Beroba as Kamen Rider Brali. Amid the struggle to escape from their pursuers, Kōsei regains his drive to protect his family with Ace giving him a Fantasy Raise Buckle to transform into Kamen Rider Gya-Go Fantasy Form. However, Gya-Go is overpowered thanks to Beroba's interference, while Ace stops Kekera from sneakily killing Kōsei.
| 44 | "Creation VI: Shining Neon"; Transliteration: "Sōsei Shikkusu: Neon, Kagayaku" (Japanese: 創世VI：ネオン、かがやく) | Teruaki Sugihara | July 16, 2023 |
Michinaga and Ace attempt to save Keiwa from himself, but he refuses to listen while consumed in darkness over the wish he made to get his family back indirectly killing them. Michinaga confronts Keiwa to make him believe in Ace's plan of a world where everyone can be happy, but loses. Meanwhile, Kōsei is hospitalized after having closure over Akari's death from defeating Numabukuro, giving Neon his ID Core and the Fantasy Raise Buckle. Having reconciled with her parents, their wishes allow Ace to restore Neon's ID Core as she finally confronts Beroba for the suffering she brought to her family.
| 45 | "Creation VII: What Becomes of Wishes"; Transliteration: "Sōsei Sebun: Negai no Yukue" (Japanese: 創世VII：願いのゆくえ) | Takayuki Shibasaki | July 23, 2023 |
Beroba recruits Kanato Sumida, formerly Kamen Rider Da·Paan, to help her get revenge on Neon, for making her feel despair. Meanwhile, Keiwa resolves to defeat Ace and turn Tsumuri into the Creation Goddess. At nighttime, Win rescues Tsumuri from Zitt's clutches. Furious, Zitt fights and knocks Win out.
| 46 | "Creation VIII: Goodbye, Micchy"; Transliteration: "Sōsei Eito: Sayonara, Mitchī" (Japanese: 創世VIII：さよなら、ミッチー) | Takayuki Shibasaki | July 30, 2023 |
After deploying Win to rescue Tsumuri, Ace sacrifices his freedom by absorbing Tsumuri's power to prevent the DGP from misusing it and frees Keiwa from being manipulated by both Kekera and Beroba and the organization. Despite his failure, Zitt uses a tear he took from Tsumuri to create her evil doppelgänger. Michinaga risks his life in disposing of his and Keiwa's former supporters. Daichi is preserved by Neon, Win and a recovered Tsumuri from being assassinated to create a serum to revive and free innocent victims who were killed in the Post-Apocalypse Game and trapped inside the Tree of Knowledge, starting from Sara. However, as a result of Ace's sacrifice, it also temporarily grants Michinaga a part of the Jyamashin's power to defeat Beroba. Michinaga tells her that someday she will find hope before she fades.
| 47 | "Creation IX: A Real Kamen Rider"; Transliteration: "Sōsei Nain: Honmono no Kamen Raidā" (Japanese: 創世IX：ホンモノの仮面ライダー) | Takayuki Shibasaki | August 13, 2023 |
As Ace's life force as a God of Creation starts to run out before he gets petrified, his friends must stop Zitt and Kekera from destroying the Earth, while a redeemed Keiwa must confront his former supporter alone out of atonement with his Bujin Sword Raise Buckle purified. Suddenly, Kekera's previous wish activates and turns active participants into inanimate objects, except for Keiwa. Kekera then forces Keiwa to become his envisioned hero by taking the people from the Labyrinth round of the "Conspiracy" DGP hostage, but Daichi rescues them in time as Keiwa battles his former Supporter to undo his wish. Despite his former Supporter having long manipulated him, Keiwa thanks Kekera before the latter fades away. Afterward, Ace finally breaks free from becoming the statue of the God of Creation and defeats Zitt, despite his acquired God of Destruction power as Kamen Rider Regad. Nevertheless, Zitt reveals himself as Suel's puppet and lets himself be absorbed by Suel, who transforms into an Omega variant of Regad while declaring a final DGP.
| 48 | "Creation X: Tsumuri's Requiem"; Transliteration: "Sōsei Ten: Tsumuri no Rekuiemu" (Japanese: 創世X：ツムリの鎮魂歌(レクイエム)) | Shojiro Nakazawa | August 20, 2023 |
Suel's plan for the DGP's series finale turns Earth into an apocalyptic war, where everyone is being forced to kill each other for a chance at happiness as "The End Riders"; or be killed by Game Masters on sight, whether the opposing participants make peace with each other or decline the invitations. In response to countermeasure the extinction level of the DGP finale, Daichi creates Helianthus Annuus Jyamato to protect and serve humanity, while Neon and Kōsei evacuate the VIPs from being forced to participate. When Suel manages to render Ace powerless, Tsumuri, who is later revealed to be possessed by her evil counterpart, suddenly confronts Ace and shoots him dead at point-blank range.
| 49 (Finale) | "Daybreak I: This Is for the Highlights!"; Transliteration: "Reimei Wan: Koko kara ga Hairaito da!" (Japanese: 黎明I：ここからがハイライトだ！) | Shojiro Nakazawa | August 27, 2023 |
With Ace believed to be rendered powerless and assassinated, at the same time both Ziin and Kyuun return, Keiwa, Neon, and Michinaga are the only ones who carry Ace's last will to destroy Suel and end the DGP in what first appeared to be a futile struggle. But Ace revealed that he feigned losing his power so he could be killed and discard the last of his mortality, restoring his friends’ powers and letting them overpower Suel. Ace then finishes Suel off and proceeds to undo the DGP's damages before erasing the organization from existence, Girori accepting his fate while Tsumuri, Ziin, and Kyuun are spared. With peace properly restored, Neon, Keiwa, Michinaga, and Win retain their Kamen Rider powers and are among the survivors whose wishes are granted as they move on to honor the casualties they could not bring back. The survivors also lose all memory of Ace, with Tsumuri and Ziin the exception while the latter seeks to recreate the DGP without Suel's influence. Somewhere, as an unseen spirit, Ace passes by a young high school boy with a flying sentient hopper card and knows that the boy is a Kamen Rider whose story is about to begin.
