= Kamen Rider Geats =

Japanese television drama

- Genre: Tokusatsu; Superhero fiction Science fiction Action; Battle royale Sports (eSports)
- Created by: Shotaro Ishinomori
- Screenplay by: Yuya Takahashi
- Directed by: Shojiro Nakazawa
- Starring: Hideyoshi Kan; Ryuga Sato; Yuna Hoshino; Kazuto Mokudai; Kokoro Aoshima; Tsubasa Sakiyama; Dai Goto; Nene Shida; Fuku Suzuki; Ryo Kitamura; Shugo Oshinari; Shihou Harumi; Ayaka Namiki; Mitsutoshi Shundo; Seia Yasuda; Ryuji Sato; Kenta Mizue
- Voices of: Yoshitsugu Matsuoka; Yuka Terasaki
- Narrated by: Junji Shiono; Sayumi Watabe
- Opening theme: "Trust・Last" by Koda Kumi feat. Shōnan no Kaze
- Composer: Toshihiko Sahashi
- Country of origin: Japan
- Original language: Japanese
- No. of episodes: 49 (list of episodes)

Production
- Producers: Chihiro Inoue (TV Asahi); Naomi Takebe (Toei)
- Running time: 25 minutes
- Production companies: TV Asahi; Toei Company; ADK Emotions

Original release
- Network: ANN (TV Asahi)
- Release: September 4, 2022 – August 27, 2023

Related
- Kamen Rider Revice; Kamen Rider Gotchard

Kamen Rider Geats (仮面ライダーギーツ, Kamen Raidā Gītsu) is a Japanese tokusatsu series and the 33rd entry of Toei Company's Kamen Rider metaseries and the fourth series in the Reiwa period. The series premiered on September 4, 2022, joining Avataro Sentai Donbrothers and later, Ohsama Sentai King-Ohger in the Super Hero Time lineup following Kamen Rider Revice's finale before concluding on August 27, 2023. Kamen Rider Gotchard would later air in its place the following week.

It is the second time in the franchise to feature a battle royale motif after Kamen Rider Ryuki, following the success of Netflix's drama series/thriller Squid Game, as well as the manga Kaiji and the media franchise The Hunger Games, and first with an eSports motif, inspired by Fortnite, Overwatch, and Apex Legends.

== Summary ==
The Desire Grand Prix (DGP) is a survival eSports game overseen by an organisation of the same name, where players must protect the city from a mysterious athletic enemy called Jyamato. Each participant is bound by the game's rules to continue playing until they die or are eliminated. The winner is rewarded with "the right to bring an ideal world to life", and so only true heroes who win the competition can realise their desired reality.

Among the participants are Ace Ukiyo, a mysterious man and the DGP's undefeated champion who competes as Kamen Rider Geats, his rival Michinaga Azuma, a construction worker who competes as Kamen Rider Buffa, graduate student Keiwa Sakurai who competes as Kamen Rider Tycoon, and social media influencer Neon Kurama who competes as Kamen Rider Na-Go. As the group fight the Jyamato to survive and the monsters grow stronger, the truth about the DGP and its creators is revealed.

With the exception of Daybreak (黎明, Reimei; 1, 49), which serves as both the prologue and epilogue of the series, the series is divided into six arcs, each covering a different season of the DGP:

- Daybreak-Prologue: It introduces the main characters and ends with Ace winning and attaining his wish of "becoming a celebrity".
- Encounter Arc (邂逅編, Kaikō-hen; 2–9): Keiwa and Neon join the DGP as Kamen Riders while Ace and Michinaga return from the previous season. Ace wins again and uses his wish of "Having Girori and Tsumuri (two members of the DGP staff) as part of his family", to investigate further on the DGP. He wants to discover why he cannot make his real wish come true, which is to reunite with his long-lost mother Mitsume.
- Conspiracy Arc (謀略編, Bōryaku-hen; 10–16): Fearing that Ace could be a liability for the organization, Girori, who is revealed to be the DGP's game master, brings DGP agent Win Hallelujah to the game to remove him permanently from the competition. Meanwhile, some of the Jyamato gain the ability to transform into Jyamato Riders. However, he ends up removed from his position for abusing his authority and indirectly causing Michinaga's death along with sacrificing Win in an attempt to kill Ace. It is revealed that the DGP is an interdimensional reality eSports game show, and the season ends with no winners.
- Divergence Arc (乖離, Kairi-hen; 17–24): Chirami assumes the role of the DGP's new eSports game master, and Ace finds the format has changed to a popularity context to place him at a disadvantage. He also learns he and the other Kamen Riders have supporters who aid them. Meanwhile, Michinaga's prolonged usage of the Zombie Buckle resurrects him, and he learns the Jyamato are evolving because a mysterious gardener named Archimedel is cultivating and nourishing them using fallen players' ID Cores. Over time, Michinaga gradually becomes a human-Jyamato hybrid as he and a disqualified DGP player named Daichi Isuzu are recruited by Archimedel and the Jyamatos' supporter Beroba. They seek to throw a wrench into the DGP and seize the "Goddess of Creation", which is the source of the DGP's power. Ace also discovers that the DGP supporters and staff are time-travelers from the future, who choose different locations from the past as venues for their games. The season ends without a winner due to Beroba seizing control.
- Lamentation Arc (慟哭編, Dōkoku-hen; 25–32): Beroba, seeking full access to the Goddess of Creation, creates a new competition called the Jyamato Grand Prix (JGP) with the roles reversed: The Jyamato, joined by Michinaga and the Dunkleosteus Jyamato, fight the Riders, with the last one standing creating their ideal world as a Jyamashin. Ace is revealed to have been continuously reincarnated and participating in the DGP since 1 AD, while Neon learns her father created her to replace his deceased daughter Akari. During the final round, Ace learns that Mitsume was transformed into the Goddess of Creation by the DGP's owner Suel, with the power to grant wishes coming from her absorbing the lives and happiness of the games' casualties. The game ends with Michinaga's victory as he attains his longtime wish to have "The power to destroy all Kamen Riders".
- Longing Arc (慕情編, Bojō-hen; 33–38): Jyamashin Michinaga proceeds to hunt down the Kamen Riders, including those from the DGP staff, until Tsumuri revives Ace by awakening a similar power to Mitsume. But when Ace turns against the DGP for what they did to his mother and Michinaga disposes of Chirami, Suel offers them his version of the Desire Royale. This version is an elimination game founded by Colus where Kamen Riders fight each other, with the winner allowed to decide the DGP's fate. Ace and Michinaga are joined by Neon and Daichi, with Keiwa also participating after Kekera tricks his sister Sara into joining the game as part of his deal with Beroba to revive his ward. Daichi is eliminated while Archimedel, whose mind was absorbed into the Dunkleosteus Jyamato, is destroyed. But the game is revealed to be a cover for Suel to have Niramu move DGP broadcasting to a different time period. Win, who is revealed to have survived being Girori's sacrificial puppet, joins Tsumuri in secretly helping Ace. The two learn about his first incarnation's birth and that his reincarnation ability is a result of Mitsume's forbidden marriage with the previous Dezashin. Samas kills Niramu for opposing Suel's intention to erase everything and make Tsumuri a replacement Goddess of Creationm while a dying Mitsume uses her remaining power to unlock her son's full potential. Ace uses this power to defeat Suel and restore everything from memory, with the DGP's existence now public knowledge.
- Creation Arc (創世編, Sōsei-hen; 39–48): Despite the laws he established to remove them from the world, Ace learns the Jyamato have evolved into small parasites that bypass his rules by possessing human hosts, and forms a task force with Win, Michinaga, and Keiwa to stop them. These Jyamoto are creations of Daichi, who used Archimedel's research to turn himself into a human-Jyamato hybrid in a plan to become a Jyamashin. Kekera and Beroba, who used Mitsume to remain in the present to observe their wards, manipulated Daichi before forming an alliance with a new Game Master named Zitt, who was sent by the DGP to capture Tsumuri. The three convince Keiwa to work for when Sara is killed, having him use Tsumuri's power to grant his wish of bringing back everyone killed in the DPG games. However, his wish also revives criminals, with his revived family killed again as Zitt, a game master that crafts unhappy endings, establishes an Apocalypse Game. Neon makes peace with her parents when her father Kōsei protects her as a Kamen Rider before giving his gear and entry to her, allowing her to become Na-Go once more. Ace gets Keiwa to realize he was being manipulated while having Win rescue Tsumuri shortly before absorbing her powers to thwart Zitt. This momentarily immobilizes Ace while Keiwa and Michinaga defeat their evil former supporters. However, Zitt uses a tear extracted from Tsumuri's Goddess of Creation state to create her evil counterpart in order to create a Zillion Driver and transforms into Kamen Rider Regad. This allows Suel to absorb him and most of their audience's cameras to enact the latter's final plan.
- Daybreak-Epilogue: Tsumuri is possessed by her counterpart to kill Ace on Suel's command, unaware that was part of Ace's secret plan to use his Boost Mark III Buckle's hidden power to revive himself as a deity. With his new powers, Ace help the other Riders defeat Suel as Regad Omega for good while erasing the DGP's staff and Game Masters. The series ends with the other characters moving on with their lives and pursuing their own dreams, with Tsumuri among the few to remember Ace as he watches over them as their new deity.

== Production ==
The Kamen Rider Geats trademark was registered by Toei on May 23, 2022, and published on May 31, 2022.

Geats was officially announced on July 22, 2022. An online production announcement conference introducing the main cast and characters and the artist for the show's theme song was held on August 7, 2022.

Geats was influenced by battle royale-related media such as Fortnite, Apex Legends, The Hunger Games, and Squid Game as well as past Kamen Rider entry Kamen Rider Ryuki to appeal to their target audience.

The main writer for Geats is Yuya Takahashi, who previously served as the main writer for Kamen Rider Ex-Aid and Kamen Rider Zero-One.

The opening theme song "Trust・Last" is performed by Kumi Koda and Shonan no Kaze.

== Episodes ==
All of the episodes were written by Yuya Takahashi.

No.	Title	Directed by	Original release date
1	"Daybreak F: Inviting You to Be a Rider"; Transliteration: "Reimei Efu: Raidā e no Shōtaijō" (Japanese: 黎明F：ライダーへの招待状)	Shojiro Nakazawa	September 4, 2022
2	"Encounter I: Treasure Hunts and Bandits"; Transliteration: "Kaikō Wan: Takara Sagashi to Tōzoku" (Japanese: 邂逅I：宝さがしと盗賊)	Shojiro Nakazawa	September 11, 2022
3	"Encounter II: Zombie Hunt"; Transliteration: "Kaikō Tsū: Zonbi Gari" (Japanese: 邂逅II：ゾンビ狩り)	Teruaki Sugihara	September 18, 2022
4	"Encounter III: Victory Conditions"; Transliteration: "Kaikō Surī: Shōri Jōken" (Japanese: 邂逅III：勝利条件)	Teruaki Sugihara	September 25, 2022
5	"Encounter IV: Doubles Concentration"; Transliteration: "Kaikō Fō: Duo Shinkeisuijaku" (Japanese: 邂逅IV：デュオ神経衰弱)	Takayuki Shibasaki	October 2, 2022
6	"Encounter V: The Boost Counterattack"; Transliteration: "Kaikō Faibu: Gyakuten no Būsuto" (Japanese: 邂逅V：逆転のブースト)	Takayuki Shibasaki	October 9, 2022
7	"Encounter VI: A Last Boss and Kick the Can"; Transliteration: "Kaikō Shikkusu: Rasubosu to Kankeri" (Japanese: 邂逅VI：ラスボスと缶けり)	Kazuya Kamihoriuchi	October 16, 2022
8	"Encounter VII: The Secret Weapon Ninja"; Transliteration: "Kaikō Sebun: Kirifuda Ninja" (Japanese: 邂逅VII：切り札ニンジャ)	Kazuya Kamihoriuchi	October 23, 2022
9	"Encounter F: Wake Up! Monster"; Transliteration: "Kaikō Efu: Weiku Appu! Monsutā" (Japanese: 邂逅F：Wake up！モンスター)	Shojiro Nakazawa	October 30, 2022
10	"Conspiracy I: Beat of the New World"; Transliteration: "Bōryaku Wan: Shin Sekai no Bīto" (Japanese: 謀略I：新世界のビート)	Shojiro Nakazawa	November 13, 2022
11	"Conspiracy II: The Jyamato Labyrinth"; Transliteration: "Bōryaku Tsū: Jamato no Meikyū" (Japanese: 謀略II：ジャマトの迷宮)	Teruaki Sugihara	November 20, 2022
12	"Conspiracy III: Slot★Fever"; Transliteration: "Bōryaku Surī: Surotto Fībā" (Japanese: 謀略III：スロット★フィーバー)	Teruaki Sugihara	November 27, 2022
13	"Conspiracy IV: Retrieve the Drivers!"; Transliteration: "Bōryaku Fō: Doraibā o Dakkan Seyo!" (Japanese: 謀略IV：ドライバーを奪還せよ！)	Koichi Sakamoto	December 4, 2022
14	"Conspiracy V: A Furious Glare"; Transliteration: "Bōryaku Faibu: Ikari no Gurea" (Japanese: 謀略V：怒りのグレア)	Koichi Sakamoto	December 11, 2022
15	"Conspiracy VI: The Right to Be a Kamen Rider"; Transliteration: "Bōryaku Shikkusu: Kamen Raidā no Shikaku" (Japanese: 謀略VI：仮面ライダーの資格)	Koichi Sakamoto	December 18, 2022
16	"Conspiracy IR: The Fox Hunt"; Transliteration: "Bōryaku Ai Āru: Kitsune Gari" (Japanese: 謀略IR：キツネ狩り)	Shojiro Nakazawa	December 25, 2022
17	"Divergence I: Welcome to the New Season!"; Transliteration: "Kairi Wan: Yōkoso! Shin Shīzun e!" (Japanese: 乖離I：ようこそ！新シーズンへ！)	Shojiro Nakazawa	January 8, 2023
18	"Divergence II: Bravo! Jyamar Ball Battle!"; Transliteration: "Kairi Tsū: Burabō! Jamā Bōru Taiketsu!" (Japanese: 乖離II：ブラボー！ジャマーボール対決！)	Teruaki Sugihara	January 15, 2023
19	"Divergence III: Time to Vote! Who's the Dezastar?!"; Transliteration: "Kairi Surī: Tōhyō! Dezasutā wa Dare da!" (Japanese: 乖離III：投票！デザスターは誰だ！)	Teruaki Sugihara	January 22, 2023
20	"Divergence IV: Jyamato Deliveries!"; Transliteration: "Kairi Fō: Jamato kara no Takuhaibin!" (Japanese: 乖離IV：ジャマトからの宅配便！)	Kyohei Yamaguchi	January 29, 2023
21	"Divergence V: Gazer's Judgment!"; Transliteration: "Kairi Faibu: Geizā no Tettsui!" (Japanese: 乖離V：ゲイザーの鉄槌！)	Kyohei Yamaguchi	February 5, 2023
22	"Divergence VI: Pursuit! Time to Catch Chirami!"; Transliteration: "Kairi Shikkusu: Tsuiseki! Chirami-oni o Tsukamaero!" (Japanese: 乖離VI：追跡！チラミ鬼をつかまえろ！)	Shojiro Nakazawa	February 12, 2023
23	"Divergence T: Now, for the Sake of My Favorite!"; Transliteration: "Kairi Tī: Iza! Oshi no Tame nara" (Japanese: 乖離T：いざ！推しのためなら)	Shojiro Nakazawa	February 19, 2023
24	"Divergence SP: Emergency Special! Behind the DGP!"; Transliteration: "Kairi Esu Pī: Kinkyū Tokuban! Dezagura no Subete!" (Japanese: 乖離SP：緊急特番！デザグラのすべて！)	Shojiro Nakazawa	February 26, 2023
25	"Lamentation I: The Jyamato Grand Prix"; Transliteration: "Dōkoku Wan: Jamato Guran Puri♡" (Japanese: 慟哭I：ジャマトグランプリ♡)	Takayuki Shibasaki	March 5, 2023
26	"Lamentation II: The Crimson Boost!"; Transliteration: "Dōkoku Tsū: Shinku no Būsuto!" (Japanese: 慟哭II：真紅のブースト！)	Takayuki Shibasaki	March 12, 2023
27	"Lamentation III: Fun with the Sengoku Game"; Transliteration: "Dōkoku Surī: Tanoshii Sengoku Gēmu♡" (Japanese: 慟哭III：たのしい戦国ゲーム♡)	Koichi Sakamoto	March 19, 2023
28	"Lamentation IV: A Laser-Boosted Relationship!"; Transliteration: "Dōkoku Fō: Kizuna no Rēzā Būsuto!" (Japanese: 慟哭IV：絆のレーザーブースト！)	Koichi Sakamoto	March 26, 2023
29	"Lamentation V: Surprise! The Bullfighting Game"; Transliteration: "Dōkoku Faibu: Sapuraizu! Tōgyū Gēmu♡" (Japanese: 慟哭V：サプライズ！闘牛ゲーム♡)	Teruaki Sugihara	April 2, 2023
30	"Lamentation VI: The Prince from the Letters"; Transliteration: "Dōkoku Shikkusu: Tegami no Naka no Ōjisama" (Japanese: 慟哭VI：手紙の中の王子様)	Teruaki Sugihara	April 9, 2023
31	"Lamentation VII: The Heaven and Hell Game"; Transliteration: "Dōkoku Sebun: Tengoku to Jigoku Gēmu♡" (Japanese: 慟哭VII：天国と地獄ゲーム♡)	Ryuta Tasaki	April 16, 2023
32	"Lamentation F: Final Judgment"; Transliteration: "Dōkoku Efu: Saigo no Shinpan" (Japanese: 慟哭F：最後の審判)	Ryuta Tasaki	April 23, 2023
33	"Longing I: The Invincible Buffa!"; Transliteration: "Bojō Wan: Baffa Musō!" (Japanese: 慕情I：バッファ無双！)	Shojiro Nakazawa	April 30, 2023
34	"Longing II: The Wrath of Geats"; Transliteration: "Bojō Tsū: Gītsu no Hokosaki" (Japanese: 慕情II：ギーツの矛先)	Shojiro Nakazawa	May 7, 2023
35	"Longing III: A Sister's Wish, a Brother's Wish"; Transliteration: "Bojō Surī: Ane no Negai, Otōto no Negai" (Japanese: 慕情III：姉の願い、弟の願い)	Hirofumi Fukuzawa	May 14, 2023
36	"Longing IV: A Fleeting Alliance"; Transliteration: "Bojō Fō: Karisome no Kyōtō" (Japanese: 慕情IV：かりそめの共闘)	Hirofumi Fukuzawa	May 21, 2023
37	"Longing V: Pure White Oblivion"; Transliteration: "Bojō Faibu: Junpaku no Hakai" (Japanese: 慕情V：純白の破壊)	Teruaki Sugihara	May 28, 2023
38	"Longing F: The Nine-Tailed White Fox!"; Transliteration: "Bojō Efu: Kyūbi no Shirogitsune!" (Japanese: 慕情F：九尾の白狐！)	Teruaki Sugihara	June 4, 2023
39	"Creation I: My DGP"; Transliteration: "Sōsei Wan: Ore no Dezagura" (Japanese: 創世I：俺のデザグラ)	Takayuki Shibasaki	June 11, 2023
40	"Creation II: Tycoon Unleashed"; Transliteration: "Sōsei Tsū: Taikūn Kakusei" (Japanese: 創世II：タイクーン覚醒)	Takayuki Shibasaki	June 18, 2023
41	"Creation III: The Jet-Black Shogun"; Transliteration: "Sōsei Surī: Shikkoku no Shōgun" (Japanese: 創世III：漆黒の将軍)	Koichi Sakamoto	June 25, 2023
42	"Creation IV: A Goddess Perfected and the Blade of the Darkness"; Transliteration: "Sōsei Fō: Megami Kasei Yami no Yaiba" (Japanese: 創世IV：女神完成 闇の刃)	Koichi Sakamoto	July 2, 2023
43	"Creation V: His Name Is Gya-Go!"; Transliteration: "Sōsei Faibu: Sono Na wa Gyāgo!" (Japanese: 創世V：その名はギャーゴ！)	Teruaki Sugihara	July 9, 2023
44	"Creation VI: Shining Neon"; Transliteration: "Sōsei Shikkusu: Neon, Kagayaku" (Japanese: 創世VI：ネオン、かがやく)	Teruaki Sugihara	July 16, 2023
45	"Creation VII: What Becomes of Wishes"; Transliteration: "Sōsei Sebun: Negai no Yukue" (Japanese: 創世VII：願いのゆくえ)	Takayuki Shibasaki	July 23, 2023
46	"Creation VIII: Goodbye, Micchy"; Transliteration: "Sōsei Eito: Sayonara, Mitchī" (Japanese: 創世VIII：さよなら、ミッチー)	Takayuki Shibasaki	July 30, 2023
47	"Creation IX: A Real Kamen Rider"; Transliteration: "Sōsei Nain: Honmono no Kamen Raidā" (Japanese: 創世IX：ホンモノの仮面ライダー)	Takayuki Shibasaki	August 13, 2023
48	"Creation X: Tsumuri's Requiem"; Transliteration: "Sōsei Ten: Tsumuri no Rekuiemu" (Japanese: 創世X：ツムリの鎮魂歌(レクイエム))	Shojiro Nakazawa	August 20, 2023
49 (Finale)	"Daybreak I: This Is for the Highlights!"; Transliteration: "Reimei Wan: Koko kara ga Hairaito da!" (Japanese: 黎明I：ここからがハイライトだ！)	Shojiro Nakazawa	August 27, 2023

== Films ==
Kamen Rider Geats made his first appearance as a cameo in the film Kamen Rider Revice the Movie: Battle Familia.

=== Movie Battle Royale ===
Kamen Rider Geats × Revice: Movie Battle Royale (仮面ライダーギーツ×リバイス MOVIEバトルロワイヤル, Kamen Raidā Gītsu Ribaisu Mūbī Batoru Rowaiyaru) is a crossover film released on December 23, 2022, starring the casts of Geats and Kamen Rider Revice as well as four returning Riders from Kamen Rider Ryuki as supporting cast members to commemorate their series' 20th anniversary. Takamasa Suga, Satoshi Matsuda, and Takashi Hagino reprised their respective roles as Shinji Kido, Ren Akiyama, and Takeshi Asakura from Ryuki. The film was written by Yuya Takahashi and Hanta Kinoshita, and directed by Takayuki Shibasaki. The theme song is "Change my future" performed by Koda Kumi. The events of the film take place between episodes 15 and 16 of the series.

=== 4 Aces and the Black Fox ===
Kamen Rider Geats the Movie: 4 Aces and the Black Fox (映画 仮面ライダーギーツ 4人のエースと黒狐, Eiga Kamen Raidā Gītsu Yo-nin no Ēsu to Kurogitsune) is a film released on July 28, 2023, double-billed with Ohsama Sentai King-Ohger the Movie: Adventure Heaven. Additionally, the main character of Kamen Rider Gotchard made his first appearance. The film was written by Yuya Takahashi and directed by Shojiro Nakazawa. The theme song is "Desire" performed by Shōnan no Kaze. This is the first film in Japan to be certified by Eiteki, a newly established system to promote appropriate and fair film production. The events of the film take place after the final episode of the series.

=== Strongest Chemy ★ Gotcha Great Operation ===
Kamen Rider the Winter Movie: Gotchard & Geats Strongest Chemy ★ Gotcha Great Operation (仮面ライダー THE WINTER MOVIE ガッチャード&ギーツ 最強ケミー★ガッチャ大作戦, Kamen Raidā Za Wintā Mūbī Gatchādo Ando Gītsu Saikyō Kemī Gatcha Dai Sakusen) is a crossover film released on December 22, 2023, starring the casts of Geats and Kamen Rider Gotchard. The film was written by Hiroki Uchida and directed by Kyohei Yamaguchi. The theme song is "All for Love" performed by Blank Paper.

== Spin-offs ==
- Kamen Rider Geats: How Is It!? Desire Grand Prix Filled With Men, I Am Ouja!! (仮面ライダーギーツ どやさ!? 男だらけのデザイアグランプリ 王蛇はオレだー!!, Kamen Raidā Gītsu Doyasa!? Otoko-darake no Dezaia Guranpuri Ōja wa Ore dā!!): Televi-Kun's "Hyper Battle DVD" (超(ハイパー)バトルDVD, Haipā Batoru Dī Bui Dī).
- Geats Extra (ギーツエクストラ, Gītsu Ekusutora): A web-exclusive series of Toei Tokusatsu Fan Club.
  - Kamen Rider PunkJack (仮面ライダーパンクジャック, Kamen Raidā Panku Jakku): A prequel and midquel special released on May 21, 2023, that focuses Win Hareruya. The theme song is "ROLLIN' ROLLIN' PUNK KING" performed by Weather Hearts.
  - Kamen Rider Tycoon Meets Kamen Rider Shinobi (仮面ライダータイクーンmeets仮面ライダーシノビ, Kamen Raidā Taikūn Mītsu Kamen Raidā Shinobi): A crossover special between Geats and Kamen Rider Zi-O's spin-off, Rider Time: Kamen Rider Shinobi released on June 18, 2023, which features episode 46 of Shinobi and ninja-themed Kamen Riders. Hideya Tawada, Asuka Hanamura, Takuma Zaiki, and Shun Sugata reprised their respective roles as Rentarō Kagura, Iroha Kagura, and Isamichi Konjō from Shinobi and Ryo Murasame from Birth of the 10th! Kamen Riders All Together!! while Nobuo Kyo and Eiji Togashi reprised their respective voice roles as Master Gamano from Shinobi and Kamen Rider Kenzan from Kamen Rider Saber. The theme song is "IZANAGI" performed by Sakuramen feat. Hideya Tawada.
  - Geats Anime: Another Grand Prix (ギーツあにめ あなざーぐらんぷり, Gītsu Anime Anazā Guran Puri): An animated short series released on August 6, 2023.
  - Emergency Special: Taken Out of Storage! Desire Grand Prix Special (緊急特番 蔵出し！デザグラスペシャル, Kinkyū Tokuban Kuradashi! Dezagura Supesharu): A special released on October 8, 2023, that features deleted scenes from Geats.
  - Kamen Rider Gazer (仮面ライダーゲイザー, Kamen Raidā Geizā): A prequel special released on April 7, 2024, that focuses Niramu. The theme song is "Non-fiction" performed by Niramu (Ryo Kitamura).
- Jack-of-All-Trades!? Boss Micchy's Day (よろずや!?ミッチー親方の一日, Yorozuya!? Mitchī-oyakata no Ichi'nichi): A special included as part of the third Blu-ray release of Geats and focuses Michinaga Azuma.

== V-Cinema ==
Kamen Rider Geats: Jyamato Awaking (仮面ライダーギーツ ジャマト・アウェイキング, Kamen Raidā Gītsu Jamato Aweikingu) is a V-Cinema release which received a limited theatrical release on March 8, 2024, followed by its DVD and Blu-ray release on July 24, 2024. The events of the V-Cinema take place after Kamen Rider Geats the Movie: The 4 Aces and the Black Fox. The V-Cinema was written by Yuya Takahashi and directed by Koichi Sakamoto. The theme song is "Dangerously" performed by Koda Kumi.

== Novel ==
Who Is Melo?, stylized as Who is MELO?, is a short story in the booklet included in the Collector's Edition of the Blu-ray release of Kamen Rider Geats the Movie: The 4 Aces and the Black Fox. It was written by Yūsuke Naitō.

== Cast ==
- Ace Ukiyo (浮世 英寿, Ukiyo Ēsu): Hideyoshi Kan (簡 秀吉, Kan Hideyoshi)
- Keiwa Sakurai (桜井 景和, Sakurai Keiwa): Ryuga Sato (佐藤 瑠雅, Satō Ryūga)
- Neon Kurama (鞍馬 祢音, Kurama Neon): Yuna Hoshino (星乃 夢奈, Hoshino Yuna)
- Michinaga Azuma (吾妻 道長, Azuma Michinaga): Kazuto Mokudai (杢代 和人, Mokudai Kazuto)
- Tsumuri (ツムリ), Black Tsumuri (黒いツムリ, Kuroi Tsumuri): Kokoro Aoshima (青島 心, Aoshima Kokoro)
- Kyuun (キューン, Kyūn): Kenta Mizue (水江 建太, Mizue Kenta)
- Win Hareruya (晴家 ウィン, Hareruya Win): Tsubasa Sakiyama (崎山 つばさ, Sakiyama Tsubasa)
- Daichi Isuzu (五十鈴 大智, Isuzu Daichi): Dai Goto (後藤 大, Gotō Dai)
- Sara Sakurai (桜井 沙羅, Sakurai Sara): Nene Shida (志田 音々, Shida Nene)
- Irumi Kurama (鞍馬 伊瑠美, Kurama Irumi): Ryoko Yuui (遊井 亮子, Yūi Ryōko)
- Kōsei Kurama (鞍馬 光聖, Kurama Kōsei): Shinji Kasahara (笠原 紳司, Kasahara Shinji)
- Niramu (ニラム): Ryo Kitamura (北村 諒, Kitamura Ryō)
- Samas (サマス, Samasu): Seia Yasuda (安田 聖愛, Yasuda Seia)
- Kekera (ケケラ): Mitsutoshi Shundo (俊藤 光利, Shundō Mitsutoshi)
- Beroba (ベロバ): Ayaka Namiki (並木 彩華, Namiki Ayaka)
- Zitt (ジット, Jitto): Ryuji Sato (佐藤 流司, Satō Ryūji)
- Ben (ベン): Michael Kinder (マイケル・K, Maikeru Kē)
- John (ジョン, Jon): Tom Constantine (トム・コンスタンタイン, Tomu Konsutantain)
- Archimedel (アルキメデル, Arukimederu): Shihou Harumi (春海 四方, Harumi Shihō)
- Ziin (ジーン, Jīn): Fuku Suzuki (鈴木 福, Suzuki Fuku)
- Chirami (チラミ): Shigenori Yamazaki (山崎 樹範, Yamazaki Shigenori)
- Girori (ギロリ): Shugo Oshinari (忍成 修吾, Oshinari Shūgo)

=== Voice cast ===
- Suel (スエル, Sueru), Vision Driver (ヴィジョンドライバー, Vijon Doraibā), Laser Raise Riser (レーザーレイズライザー, Rēzā Reizu Raizā): Yoshitsugu Matsuoka (松岡 禎丞, Matsuoka Yoshitsugu)
- Mitsume (ミツメ): Yuka Terasaki (寺崎 裕香, Terasaki Yuka)
- Narrator: Junji Shiono (塩野 潤二, Shiono Junji)
- Jyamato Grand Prix (ジャマトグランプリ, Jamato Guran Puri) Narration: Sayumi Watabe (渡部 紗弓, Watabe Sayumi)

=== Guest cast ===
- Takeshi Goutokuji (豪徳寺 武, Gōtokuji Takeshi; 1, 17–19): Yamato Kinjo (金城 大和, Kinjō Yamato)
- Morio Koganeya (小金屋 森魚, Koganeya Morio; 2–6): Koji Abe (あべ こうじ, Abe Kōji)
- Fukuo Fukuoka (福岡 福男, Fukuoka Fukuo; 1, 7, 13, 48–49): Mr. Chin (ミスターちん, Misutā Chin)
- Jirō Ogata (尾形 次郎, Ogata Jirō; 11–12): Kouichi Sudou (須藤 公一, Sudō Kōichi)
- Skateboarder (39): Hayate Ataka (安宅 波颯, Ataka Hayate)
- Evil Goddess (邪神, Jashin; Voice; 31–32): Misa Watanabe (渡辺 美佐, Watanabe Misa)
- Ōnishi (大西; 41): Tadashi Mizuno (水野 直, Mizuno Tadashi)
- Melo (メロ, Mero; 45): Haruka Kudō (工藤 遥, Kudō Haruka)
- Kamen Rider X Geats (仮面ライダーX(クロス)ギーツ, Kamen Raidā Kurosu Gītsu; Voice; 45): Shouhei Osada (長田 庄平, Osada Shōhei)
- Houtaro Ichinose (一ノ瀬 宝太郎, Ichinose Hōtarō; 49): Junsei Motojima (本島 純政, Motojima Junsei)
- Hopper1 (ホッパー1, Hoppāwan; Voice; 49): Misato Fukuen (福圓 美里, Fukuen Misato)

== Theme songs ==
Opening theme

- "Trust・Last"
  - Lyrics: Shoko Fujibayashi
  - Composition & Arrangement: Hi-yunk (Back-On)
  - Artist: Kumi Koda × Shonan no Kaze
  Episodes 1, 16, 33, 38, and 49 do not feature the show's opening sequence. This song is used as the ending theme in episodes 1, 16, and 33 as well as an insert song in episodes 13, 15, 28, 38, and 49.

Insert themes

- "Nichiyobi no Noraneko" (日曜日のノラネコ, "Stray Cat on Sunday")
  - Lyrics: Shio Watanabe
  - Composition: Go Sakabe
  - Artist: Hime Hashimura
- "Live for the moment"
  - Lyrics: Shoko Fujibayashi
  - Composition: tatsuo
  - Artist: Ace Ukiyo & Ziin (Hideyoshi Kan & Fuku Suzuki)
  - Episodes: 28
- "Negai" (願い; "Wish")
  - Lyrics: Saori Codama
  - Composition: Go Sakabe
  - Artist: Yuka Terasaki
  - Episodes: 40, 42
- "Chair"
  - Lyrics: KENJI03, TEEDA
  - Composition & Arrangement: KENJI03
  - Artist: Back-On
  - Episodes: 42
  Also used in Kamen Rider Geats: Jyamato Awaking.

Movie themes

- "Change my future"
  - Lyrics: Koda Kumi
  - Composition & Arrangement: Hi-yunk (Back-On), Alan Shirahama, SLAY
  - Artist: Koda Kumi
  - The theme song for Kamen Rider Geats × Revice: Movie Battle Royale.
  Also used as an ending theme in episode 49.
- "Desire"
  - Lyrics & Artist: Shonan no Kaze
  - The ending theme for Kamen Rider Geats the Movie: 4 Aces and the Black Fox.
- "CREATORs"
  - Lyrics: Shoko Fujibayashi
  - Composition: Go Sakabe
  - Artist: Hideyoshi Kan, Ryuga Sato, Yuna Hoshino, Kazuto Mokudai and Kokoro Aoshima
  - The theme song for Kamen Rider Geats: Jyamato Awaking.
- "Dangerously"
  - Lyrics: Shoko Fujibayashi
  - Composition: Hi-yunk (Back-On)
  - Artist: Koda Kumi
  - The ending theme for Kamen Rider Geats: Jyamato Awaking.

== International broadcasts, home media, and video streaming ==
- On Valentine's Day 2024, Shout! Studios announced that Kamen Rider Geats would be receiving a Region 1 release on Blu-ray in Japanese with English Subtitles. The complete series was released in an eight disc box set on April 23, 2024. This is the fifth Kamen Rider series to be released on home media in North America following Kamen Rider V3, Kamen Rider Zero-One, Kamen Rider Ryuki, and Kamen Rider Kuuga. Also announced on the same day as the upcoming Blu-ray release, Geats was made available to stream in the United States and Canada via both Tubi and Pluto TV.
- Geats aired on RTV in Indonesia from July to December 2024 with an Indonesian dub.
- In the Philippines, the show was aired on GMA Network's Fantaseries weekday morning block dubbed as Filipino from August 17 to October 23, 2026. All 49 episodes were covered.
