= Super Space Sheriff Gavan Infinity =

Japanese television series

- Genre: Tokusatsu; Superhero fiction Action; Drama; Space western
- Created by: Saburo Yatsude
- Written by: Atsuhiro Tomioka (head)
- Directed by: Hirofumi Fukuzawa
- Starring: Kohei Nagata; Ryuga Akahane; Kokona Sumi; Kentaro Yasui; Arihiro Matsunaga; Kohana Arisaka; Hiroto Yasuda; Lana Tanida; Anna Iriyama; Ray Fujita; Toshihiko Seki; Yūta Hiraoka
- Voices of: Takehito Koyasu; Ayako Kawasumi
- Narrated by: Ayako Kawasumi
- Music by: Kentaro Sonoda; Yuki Nara
- Ending theme: "LOVE IS THE STRONGEST" by May'n
- Country of origin: Japan
- Original language: Japanese
- No. of episodes: 23

Production
- Producers: Takehiro Ōkawa (TV Asahi); Keisuke Shibataka (TV Asahi); Yoshito Kuji (Toei); Ryōhei Takahashi (Toei); Takuto Watanabe (Toei); Jōji Nagahashi (Toei Advertising); Kanna Ogasawara (Toei Advertising)
- Production locations: Greater Tokyo Area, Japan
- Running time: 25 minutes
- Production companies: TV Asahi; Toei Company; Toei Advertising

Original release
- Network: ANN (TV Asahi)
- Release: February 15 – July 19, 2026

Related
- Kakusei Hunter Omegahorn

Super Space Sheriff Gavan Infinity (超宇宙刑事ギャバン インフィニティ, Chō Uchū Keiji Gyaban Infiniti) is a Japanese tokusatsu television series produced by Toei Company and TV Asahi. It is the first installment in Toei's Project R.E.D. series, taking heavy inspiration from the 1982 Metal Hero Series, Space Sheriff Gavan. Hirofumi Fukuzawa directed the series with Atsuhiro Tomioka as the head writer.

The series premiered on February 15, 2026, joining Kamen Rider ZEZTZ in the Super Hero Time lineup on TV Asahi following No.1 Sentai Gozyuger's finale, which is the last installment of the Super Sentai franchise to date. After its finale, Kakusei Hunter Omegahorn would take over the slot and continue its story of the sequel.

== Plot ==
There are mysterious lifeforms known as "Emorgies" that can amplify people's emotions and give them special powers. Reiji Doki, a member of the Galaxy Federal Police who can transform into Space Sheriff Gavan Infinity, travels across the multiverse, solving incidents regarding criminals misusing the power of the Emorgears accompanied by the researcher Daisuke Date and the autonomous artificial intelligence "AGI". The team have the occasional assistance of other officers who also bear the title of Space Sheriff Gavan in their respective universes, such as Setsuna Aikokuin/Space Sheriff Gavan Bushido, an artificially created human and former soldier, Kiki Iwai/Space Sheriff Gavan Luminous, a forensic researcher, and Kunai Kazanami/Space Sheriff Gavan Raiya, a ninja who also can travel between dimensions. Later, Reiji discovers that Tesshin Mikage, a former member of the Galaxy Federal Police and his predecessor who turned rogue and now calls himself Death Gavan, is responsible for spreading the Emorgears across the multiverse for the awakening of an ancient evil called Aza Zoth.

== Production ==
The Super Space Sheriff Gavan Infinity trademark was registered by Toei Company on November 11, 2025, and published on November 19, 2025.

Gavan Infinity was officially announced on November 24, 2025. Toei describes Gavan Infinity as "a completely new series built from the ground up using cutting-edge visual expression and production techniques", while retaining the original series' "innovative qualities, such as its unique hero visuals and space-based sci-fi elements". An online production announcement conference introducing the main cast and characters and the artist for the show's theme song was held on January 18, 2026.

== Episodes ==
No.	Title	Director	Writer	Original airdate
1	"Red Gavan"; Transliteration: "Akai Gyaban" (Japanese: 赤いギャバン)	Hirofumi Fukuzawa	Atsuhiro Tomioka	February 15, 2026
Reiji Doki is a member of the Galaxy Federal Police who travels across the multiverse to stop criminals using the power of the Emorgears, accompanied by his partners, researcher Daisuke Date and the autonomous artificial intelligence "AGI". At Multi-Earth Lambda 8018, he faces one of these incidents, transforming into Space Sheriff Gavan Infinity to protect the multiverse.
2	"Twin Blades"; Transliteration: "Futatsu no Yaiba" (Japanese: 二つの刃)	Hirofumi Fukuzawa	Atsuhiro Tomioka	February 22, 2026
Reiji comes across Setsuna Aikokuin, who can transform into Space Sheriff Gavan Bushido. Confused at first because the title of Space Sheriff Gavan is exclusive to only one individual in the entire universe, Setsuna attacks Reiji at first, but they eventually join forces to stop the criminal spreading Emorgears across Setsuna's universe.
3	"Kiki and Koto"; Transliteration: "Kiki to Koto" (Japanese: キキとコト)	Hiroyuki Katō	Atsuhiro Tomioka	March 1, 2026
Reiji and his team's next stop is Multi-Earth Iota 5109 where they assist Kiki Iwai, who can transform into Space Sheriff Gavan Luminous, and her partner Kotobuki "Koto" Takanari to arrest an Emorgear criminal intending to take revenge on a mob ruler.
4	"Underground Fortress"; Transliteration: "Chitei no Yōsai" (Japanese: 地底の要塞)	Hiroyuki Katō	Hiroshi Yamaguchi	March 8, 2026
At Multi-Earth Sigma 3302, Reiji meets the investigator Shoko Hanemura and her partner Mikuro Arimoto, an ant who can transform into Space Sheriff Gavan Ameise, as they join forces to stop an Emorgear criminal who is sinking buildings with an underground machine.
5	"Sword and Bullet"; Transliteration: "Katana to Jūdan" (Japanese: 刀と銃弾)	Kyohei Yamaguchi	Tatsuto Higuchi	March 15, 2026
Reiji returns to Setsuna's universe and learns that his superior officer, Rui Amo, was kidnapped by an Emorgear criminal who uses her as leverage against him, and they join forces again to rescue her.
6	"Phantom Thief Fade Enters"; Transliteration: "Kaitō Feido Tōjō" (Japanese: 怪盗フェイド登場)	Kyohei Yamaguchi	Natsumi Morichi	March 22, 2026
Reiji and co. assist Kiki and Koto's chase of a child and her mother who used the power of an Emorgear to escape her abusive father, who sent the Phantom Thief Fade after them.
7	"Black Gavan"; Transliteration: "Kuroi Gyaban" (Japanese: 黒いギャバン)	Shun Miyazaki	Atsuhiro Tomioka	March 29, 2026
Back to their original universe, Multi-Earth Alpha 0073, Reiji and Daisuke are attacked by Death Gavan, Reiji's predecessor who once was known as Space Sheriff Gavan Destiny before he turned traitor. Daisuke is injured and Reiji chases after Death Gavan, challenging him to a duel, which ends once a mysterious explosion of Emorgy ends the fight and Death Gavan flees.
8	"The Shooter with Magic Bullets"; Transliteration: "Madan no Shashu" (Japanese: 魔弾の射手)	Shun Miyazaki	Hiroshi Yamaguchi	April 5, 2026
Setsuna realizes that an Emorgear criminal in his universe is an old acquaintance of his and Reiji steps in to help him.
9	"Crisis in the Forensics Division"; Transliteration: "Kanshiki-ka no Kiki" (Japanese: 鑑識課の危機)	Hirofumi Fukuzawa	Atsuhiro Tomioka	April 12, 2026
Reiji returns to Kiki and Koto's universe, seeking their help to analyze a missing Emorgear who reappeared and finds the two investigators having a quarrel when a troublesome Emons capable of multiplying itself appears.
10	"Ninja Gavan"; Transliteration: "Shinobi no Gyaban" (Japanese: 忍びのギャバン)	Hirofumi Fukuzawa	Atsuhiro Tomioka	April 19, 2026
Reiji and co. are testing a new equipment for the Cosmo Gavarion when Kunai Kazanami, a ninja who just like Reiji, can travel between dimensions, transforms into Space Sheriff Gavan Raiya and attacks them.
11	"Dimensional Ninja Scroll"; Transliteration: "Jigen Ninpōchō" (Japanese: 次元忍法帖)	Hiroyuki Katō	Atsuhiro Tomioka	April 26, 2026
Reiji accompanies Kunai back to his universe, Multi-Earth Zeta 2066, where Reiji learns that Kunai's sister Hatsune is held hostage by a powerful criminal organization and used as leverage against him, so they team up to rescue her.
12	"Samurai and Ninja"; Transliteration: "Bushi to Ninja" (Japanese: 武士と忍者)	Hiroyuki Katō	Natsumi Morichi	May 3, 2026
Having learned about an impending crisis threatening the entire multiverse, Kunai starts traveling to the other universes to seek the help of the other Space Sheriff Gavans. His first stop is in Setsuna's universe, where Setsuna is distraught with the fact that he can't cry like the other normal beings. He meets Reiji and Kunai and together they face another Emorgear criminal.
13	"The Gavan Kidnapping Case"; Transliteration: "Gyaban Yūkai Jiken" (Japanese: ギャバン誘拐事件)	Hiroyuki Katō	Tatsuto Higuchi	May 10, 2026
Kiki is possessed by an alien ghost who seeks to reunite with her beloved and Koto looks for her with Kunai's help.
14	"The Truth of the Universe"; Transliteration: "Uchū no Shinri" (Japanese: 宇宙の真理)	Katsuya Watanabe	Atsuhiro Tomioka	May 17, 2026
Tesshin Mikage, also known as Death Gavan, reappears and invites Reiji to Makuu Space where he reveals his true intentions.
15	"Patlan's Decision"; Transliteration: "Patoran no Ketsudan" (Japanese: パトランの決断)	Katsuya Watanabe	Hiroshi Yamaguchi	May 24, 2026
Determined to become a Space Sheriff Gavan and prove himself, Patlan investigates a series of bombing incidents and puts himself in harm's way to protect the city.
16	"Runaway Space Express"; Transliteration: "Uchū Tokkyū Dai Bōsō" (Japanese: 宇宙特急大暴走)	Kyohei Yamaguchi	Tatsuto Higuchi	May 31, 2026
Reiji and his team arrive at Multi-Earth Phi 5791 where all mankind had uploaded their minds into the cyberspace and travels the solar system on space railroads, and team up with the Biccringer, a robot who can transform into Space Railway Sheriff Gavan Diagram to stop a rogue AI who threatens all humanity. Meanwhile, Kunai is informed by his superior that he is forbidden from investigating any further on Death Gavan.
17	"For the Sake of Smiles"; Transliteration: "Egao no Tame ni" (Japanese: 笑顔のために)	Kyohei Yamaguchi	Natsumi Morichi	June 7, 2026
Kiki and Koto finally capture Phantom Thief Fade, but as they interrogate him, they and Reiji must deal with a huge meteor en route towards their Earth.
18	"Someone Special"; Transliteration: "Taisetsu na Hito" (Japanese: 大切な人)	Katsuya Watanabe	Chinatsu Hojo	June 14, 2026
Reiji, Rui and Setsuna infiltrate a suspicious matchmaking party to investigate. In the occasion, Setsuna reminisces about a special person from his past.
19	"Koto and Kiki"; Transliteration: "Koto to Kiki" (Japanese: コトとキキ)	Katsuya Watanabe	Tatsuto Higuchi	June 21, 2026
Kiki is severely injured in action and Koto herself transforms into Space Sheriff Gavan Luminous to fight in her place. Meanwhile, Reiji attempts to get to their universe to help but is trapped in Makuu Space instead where he meets Mikage again.
20	"Because of Love"; Transliteration: "Ai ga Yue ni" (Japanese: 愛が故に)	Kyohei Yamaguchi	Atsuhiro Tomioka	June 28, 2026
Koto is devastated that Kiki lost her memories as the price she paid to become Gavan in her place. Meanwhile, Mikage and his culprits begin the final stage of their plan to bring forth Aza Zoth.
21	"Gavan Assemble"; Transliteration: "Gyaban Shūketsu" (Japanese: ギャバン集結)	Kyohei Yamaguchi	Atsuhiro Tomioka	July 5, 2026
Aza Zoth's cult spreads negative pools of energy across the multiverse. In response, Reiji and the other Space Sheriff Gavans join forces to stop them.
22	"Jo-Chaku"; Transliteration: "Jōchaku" (Japanese: 蒸着)	Hirofumi Fukuzawa	Atsuhiro Tomioka	July 12, 2026
While the other Space Sheriff Gavans fight Aza Zoth's cult across the multiverse despite being forbidden from accessing their powers, Reiji confronts the supreme chancellor of the Gavan System.
23	"Infinity"; Transliteration: "Infiniti" (Japanese: インフィニティ)	Hirofumi Fukuzawa	Atsuhiro Tomioka	July 19, 2026
Having earned the trust and approval of the Supreme Chancellor, the Space Sheriff Gavans regain their powers and defeat the cult members, while Reiji confronts Mikage in a decisive battle and destroys him for good. Peace apparently returns to the multiverse, but there are hints that the cult is still active and conspiring in the shadows. Sometime later, Daisuke and AGI find Reiji's ship and weapon adrift in space, but no sign of him.

== Films ==
=== The Day the Sun Cried ===
Super Space Sheriff Gavan Infinity: The Day the Sun Cried (超宇宙刑事ギャバン インフィニティ 太陽が泣いた日, Chō Uchū Keiji Gyaban Infiniti Taiyō ga Naita Hi) is a film released in Japanese theaters on July 24, 2026, double-billed with Kamen Rider ZEZTZ: Farewell Mission. Additionally, the main character of Kakusei Hunter Omegahorn made his first appearance. The film was written by Atsuhiro Tomioka and directed by Hirofumi Fukuzawa. The events of the film take place between episodes 21 and 22 of the series.

== V-Cinema ==
==== Gavan Infinity vs. Raiya ====
Super Space Sheriff Gavan Infinity vs. Raiya (超宇宙刑事ギャバン インフィニティVSライヤ, Chō Uchū Keiji Gyaban Infiniti Bāsasu Raiya) is a V-Cinema release scheduled for a limited theatrical release on December 11, 2026, followed by its DVD and Blu-ray release on June 9, 2027. The events of the V-Cinema take place after the end of the series. The V-Cinema was written by Atsuhiro Tomioka and directed by Hirofumi Fukuzawa. The theme song is "Feeling your Dream" performed by 7ORDER.

== Special episodes ==
- Super Space Sheriff Gavan Infinity: Supplementary Investigation: Off-Duty Gavan (超宇宙刑事ギャバン インフィニティ 補完捜査 ギャバンの非番, Chō Uchū Keiji Gyaban Infiniti Hokan Sōsa Gyaban no Hiban): A web-exclusive series released on Toei Tokusatsu Fan Club on March 8, 2026.
- Kakusei Hunter Omegahorn: The Hunters' Secret Records with Gavan (角醒ハンターオメガホーン ハンターたちの黙秘録 withギャバン, Kakusei Hantā Omegahōn Hantā-tachi no Mokuhiroku Wizu Gyaban): A web-exclusive crossover series between Gavan Infinity and Kakusei Hunter Omegahorn released on Toei Tokusatsu Fan Club on July 26, 2026.
- Super Space Sheriff Gavan Infinity Side Story (超宇宙刑事ギャバン インフィニティ 外伝, Chō Uchū Keiji Gyaban Infiniti Gaiden): A web-exclusive sequel series released on Toei Tokusatsu Fan Club and YouTube on August 2, 2026.
- Yoroshiku Amigo (よろしくアミーゴ, Yoroshiku amīgo): A web-exclusive series released on Toei Tokusatsu Fan Club on November 22, 2026.

== Cast ==
- Reiji Doki (弩城 怜慈, Doki Reiji): Kohei Nagata (長田 光平, Nagata Kōhei)
- Setsuna Aikokuin (哀哭院 刹那, Aikokuin Setsuna): Ryuga Akahane (赤羽 流河, Akahane Ryūga)
- Kiki Iwai (祝 喜輝, Iwai Kiki): Kokona Sumi (角 心菜, Sumi Kokona)
- Kunai Kazanami (風波 駆無, Kazanami Kunai): Kentaro Yasui (安井 謙太郎, Yasui Kentarō)
- Daisuke Date (伊達 大佐, Date Daisuke): Arihiro Matsunaga (松永 有紘, Matsunaga Arihiro)
- AGI (アギ, Agi): Kohana Arisaka (有坂 心花, Arisaka Kohana)
- Rikiya Wanibuchi (和仁淵 力哉, Wanibuchi Rikiya): Hiroto Yasuda (安田 啓人, Yasuda Hiroto)
- Rui Amo (天羽 琉唯, Amō Rui), Seoritsu (瀬織津): Anna Iriyama (入山 杏奈, Iriyama An'na)
- Kotobuki Takanari (高鳴 寿, Takanari Kotobuki): Lana Tanida (谷田 ラナ, Tanida Rana)
- Tesshin Mikage (御蔭 哲真, Mikage Tesshin): Ray Fujita (藤田 玲, Fujita Rei)
- Supreme Chancellor (最高議長, Saikō Gichō): Toshihiko Seki (関 俊彦, Seki Toshihiko)
- Taito Gato (我藤 泰斗, Gatō Taito): Takahiro Fujimoto (藤本 隆宏, Fujimoto Takahiro)
- Karel Qom Vigiles (カレル・コム・ウィギレス, Kareru Komu Wigiresu): Yūta Hiraoka (平岡 祐太, Hiraoka Yūta)

=== Voice cast ===
- Patlan (パトラン, Patoran): Takehito Koyasu (子安 武人, Koyasu Takehito)
- Cosmo Gavarion (コスモギャバリオン, Kosumo Gyabarion), Gavarion Trigger (ギャバリオントリガー, Gyabarion Torigā): Toshihiko Seki
- Emorgears (エモルギア, Emorugia), Gavan Amigo (ギャバン・アミーゴ, Gyaban Amīgo), Narrator: Ayako Kawasumi (川澄 綾子, Kawasumi Ayako)

=== Guest cast ===
- Karasumaro (鴉麿; 2–3, 20–23): Yuya Miyashita (宮下 雄也, Miyashita Yūya)
- Goran (ゴーラン, Gōran; 12): Jouji Shibue (渋江 譲二, Shibue Jōji)
- Miya Sakaura (坂浦 美弥, Sakaura Miya; 19-23): Himena Yamada (山田 姫奈, Yamada Himena)
- Ashton Hesla Warren (アシュトン・ヘスラ・ウォーラン, Ashuton Hesura Wōran; 20–23): Kenji Matsuda (松田 賢二, Matsuda Kenji)

== Theme song ==
- "LOVE IS THE STRONGEST"
  - Lyrics: Mike Sugiyama (マイク スギヤマ, Maiku Sugiyama)
  - Composition: Hitomi Sano (佐野 仁美, Sano Hitomi)
  - Arrangement: Misato Tsuchiya (つちや みさと, Tsuchiya Misato)
  - Artist: May'n

== Broadcasts and streaming ==
- In Japan, it is currently airing on ANN's flagship station TV Asahi on Sunday Mornings at 9:30AM JST, starting February 15, 2026.
- Outside Japan, the series was licensed by Medialink who also handles the streaming rights for Kamen Rider ZEZTZ and began streaming it on the Ani-One YouTube Channel in the Philippines on May 5, 2026.
- In Indonesia, the series aired on RTV with an Indonesian dub on Saturday and Sunday Mornings at 7:30AM Western Indonesia Time (WIB), starting June 20, 2026.
- In Thailand, the series streamed on Hero Cartoon Club YouTube channel with a Thai dub.
