= Hirofumi Fukuzawa =

Japanese actor (born 1970)

- Born: 27 February 1970 (age 56); Nagano Prefecture, Japan
- Occupation: Actor
- Spouse: Naoko Kamio

Hirofumi Fukuzawa (福沢 博文, Fukuzawa Hirofumi) (born February 7, 1970, in Nagano Prefecture) is a Japanese actor and television Director. He is an affiliate of Red Action Club and a former affiliate of Japan Action Enterprise. He is most known for his work in the Super Sentai and Power Rangers series as a suit actor. He is the husband of fellow suit actress Naoko Kamio. He has also worked as the action director of the Super Sentai series and Kamen Rider series, having taken up the role starting with Tokumei Sentai Go-Busters. Outside Super Sentai acting, he portrayed Gamera in Gamera 3: Revenge of Iris.

== Stunt/Suit Actor Roles ==
=== Super Sentai Series ===
- Choujuu Sentai Liveman (1988–1989) - Jimmers
- Kousoku Sentai Turboranger (1989–1990) - Wular Soldiers
- Chikyu Sentai Fiveman (1990–1991) - Batzler Soldiers
- Kyoryu Sentai Zyuranger (1992–1993) - Tyranno Ranger (Sub)
- Gosei Sentai Dairanger (1993–1994) - Ryuuseioh (Sub)
- Chōriki Sentai Ohranger (1995–1996) - Machine Beasts, OhRed (Sub)
- Gekisou Sentai Carranger (1996–1997) - Zelmoda, RedRacer (Sub), Emperor Exhaus
- Denji Sentai Megaranger (1997-1998) - MegaRed (Sub)
- Seijuu Sentai Gingaman (1998–1999) - Budoh, GingaRed (Sub), Biznella
- Kyuukyuu Sentai GoGoFive (1999–2000) - Cobolda, GoRed (Sub)
- Mirai Sentai Timeranger (2000-2001) - TimeRed (Sub), TimeFire (Sub), Arms Smuggler Hammer
- Hyakujuu Sentai Gaoranger (2001–2002) - GaoRed, Gao Muscle, Gao Hunter
- Ninpuu Sentai Hurricaneger (2002–2003) - HurricaneRed, Gouraijin
- Bakuryuu Sentai Abaranger (2003–2004) - AbaRed, Killer-Oh
- Tokusou Sentai Dekaranger (2004–2005) - DekaRed, DekaBaseRobo, Gyoku Rou
- Mahou Sentai Magiranger (2005–2006) MagiGreen, Magitaurus, Lunagel, MagiKing, MagiLegend, Hades God Titan (main)
- GoGo Sentai Boukenger (2006–2007) - BoukenRed, Daitanken
- Juken Sentai Gekiranger (2007–2008) - GekiRed, GekiTohja, Geki Fire
- Engine Sentai Go-onger (2008–2009) - Go-on Red, Engine-Oh
- Samurai Sentai Shinkenger (2009–2010) - Shinken Red, Shinkenoh
- Tensou Sentai Goseiger (2010–2011) - Gosei Blue, Gosei Ultimate
- Kaizoku Sentai Gokaiger (2011–2012) - Gokai Red
- Tokumei Sentai Go-Busters (2012-2013) - Red Buster (Sub)
- Doubutsu Sentai Zyuohger (2016-2017) - Gokai Red (Episodes 28 & 29)
- Uchu Sentai Kyuranger (2017-2018) - DekaRed (Episode 18)
- Avataro Sentai Donbrothers (2022-2023) - Trainer (Episode 36)
- Bakuage Sentai Boonboomger (2024-2025) - Go-on Red (Episode 12)
- No.1 Sentai Gozyuger (2025-2026) - Shinken Red (Episode 33), DekaRed (Episode 38)

=== Kamen Rider Series ===
- Kamen Rider Kuuga (2000–2001) - Gurongi
- Kamen Rider 555 (2003–2004) - Kamen Rider Faiz (sub)
- Kamen Rider Kabuto (2006–2007) - ZECTroopers
- Kamen Rider Kiva (2008–2009) - Fangire
- Kamen Rider Decade (2009) - Shinken Red, Kamen Rider Faiz, Kamen Rider Kabuto, Taurus Ballista
- Kamen Rider × Kamen Rider × Kamen Rider The Movie: Cho-Den-O Trilogy: Episode Yellow: Treasure de End Pirates (2010) - Kamen Rider Kabuki
- Kamen Rider W Returns: Kamen Rider Accel (2011) - Kamen Rider Accel

=== Metal Hero Series ===
- B-Robo Kabutack (1997–1998) - Spidon (Super Mode)

=== Ultra Series ===
- Ultraman Gaia (1998–1999) - Ultraman Gaia (sub)
- Ultraman Max (2005–2006) - Ultraman Max (sub)
- Superior Ultraman 8 Brothers (2008) - Ultraman Gaia

=== Other Roles ===
- Gamera 3: Revenge of Iris (1999) - Gamera

== Director/Action Director Credits ==
=== Super Sentai Series ===
- Tokumei Sentai Go-Busters - Action director
- Zyuden Sentai Kyoryuger - Action director
- Ressha Sentai ToQger - Action director
- Shuriken Sentai Ninninger - Action director
- Doubutsu Sentai Zyuohger - Action director
- Uchu Sentai Kyuranger - Action director
- Kaitou Sentai Lupinranger VS Keisatsu Sentai Patranger - Action director
- Kishiryu Sentai Ryusoulger - Action director
- Mashin Sentai Kiramager - Action director
- Kikai Sentai Zenkaiger - Action director
- Avataro Sentai Donbrothers - Action director
- No.1 Sentai Gozyuger - Action director

=== Kamen Rider Series ===
- Kamen Rider Geats - Director
- Kamen Rider Gotchard - Action director / Director

=== Project R.E.D. Series ===
- Super Space Sheriff Gavan Infinity - Director
