= Project R.E.D. =

2026 Japanese media franchise

Project R.E.D. Series
- Created by: Saburo Yatsude
- Original work: Super Space Sheriff Gavan Infinity
- Owner: Toei Company
- Years: 2026–present

Films and television
- Television series: See below

The Project R.E.D. Series (プロジェクトレッドシリーズ, Purojekuto Reddo Shirīzu) is a Japanese media franchise created by the Toei Company to succeed the long-running Super Sentai Series in its timeslot after No.1 Sentai Gozyuger's finale.

The full title of the series is Project Records of Extraordinary Dimensions, and will focus on interconnected stories about red-suited heroes. The first entry of the franchise is Super Space Sheriff Gavan Infinity, a reimagining of 1982's Space Sheriff Gavan with the latest technology. The series aims to be a "third pillar" of Toei Tokusatsu production alongside the Super Sentai Series and the Kamen Rider Series.

== Series overview ==
Project R.E.D. takes its name from the initials “Records of Extraordinary Dimensions,” representing a saga of multidimensional heroism. True to the acronym "R.E.D.", the new initiative will center on “red heroes,” while expanding more on the large-scale, multi-title multiverse where several works intersect and grow into a cohesive world.

The idea of Project R.E.D. is that it will create a interconnected, crossover-ready world view similar to the Marvel Cinematic Universe, but with traditional Tokusatsu suit action akin to the Super Sentai and Metal Heroes franchises. Unlike the Kamen Rider and Super Sentai Series which usually air for an entire year, the series in Project R.E.D. air for a half-year instead.

The second show in the franchise, Kakusei Hunter Omegahorn started broadcast on July 26, 2026. Despite having its own story, the series continues the plot from Gavan Infinity, including appearances from most of its characters.

== Production ==
=== Main series ===
No.	Title	No. of Episodes	Originally aired	
No.	Title	No. of Episodes	First aired	Last aired
1	Super Space Sheriff Gavan Infinity	23	February 15, 2026	July 19, 2026
2	Kakusei Hunter Omegahorn	TBA	July 26, 2026	2027
3	TBA	TBA	2027	TBA

=== Theatrical releases ===
- 2026: Super Space Sheriff Gavan Infinity: The Day the Sun Cried

=== V-Cinext releases ===
- 2026: Super Space Sheriff Gavan Infinity vs. Raiya
