= List of Kamen Rider Gavv episodes =

This is a list of episodes for Kamen Rider Gavv, a Japanese tokusatsu television drama. It is the sixth series in the franchise released in Japan's Reiwa Era and the 35th entry of Toei's long-running Kamen Rider series produced by TV Asahi.

== Episodes ==
No.	Title	Directed by	Written by	Original release date
1	"A Snack Kamen Rider!?"; Transliteration: "Okashi na Kamen Raidā!?" (Japanese: おカシな仮面ライダー!?)	Teruaki Sugihara	Junko Kōmura	September 1, 2024
Shoma, a human-Granute hybrid from the Granute World gets stranded on Earth, the home world of his mother. When he learns that other humans are being abducted by the Granutes to be transformed into Dark Treats, Shoma decides to make use of the power of his new companions, the Gochizo to protect them as Kamen Rider Gavv.
2	"Happy Zakuzakuchips"; Transliteration: "Shiawase Zakuzakuchippusu" (Japanese: 幸せザクザクチップス)	Teruaki Sugihara	Junko Kōmura	September 8, 2024
Hungry and homeless, Shoma is taken in by Sachika Amane, who runs an anything and everything general store. Meanwhile, the Stomach Family, who are the responsible for the abductions and the death of Shoma's mother, send another agent to kidnap a client of hers.
3	"Soda Punch Is a Guilty Pleasure"; Transliteration: "Sōda Panchi wa Tsumi na Aji" (Japanese: ソーダパンチは罪な味)	Takayuki Shibasaki	Junko Kōmura	September 15, 2024
Shoma befriends a man called Yahiko Sujimoto. When Sujimoto is attacked by the Granute, Shoma transforms into Gavv to protect him, watched from afar by freelance journalist Hanto Karakida.
4	"More Marshmallows Please!"; Transliteration: "Mashumaro Okawari!" (Japanese: マシュマロおかわり！)	Takayuki Shibasaki	Junko Kōmura	September 22, 2024
Shoma gets acquainted with an old couple until he is attacked by the Granutes. Among them are Siita and Jiip Stomach, members of the Stomach Family and Shoma's siblings. In the occasion, it is revealed that his mother was a human and wife of the Stomach Family patriarch, who was killed in front of Shoma after his father's passing. Meanwhile, Hanto visits Kenzo Suga, a researcher who also reveals to him the true nature of the Granutes and their objective.
5	"The Memories Are Painful"; Transliteration: "Omoide ga Hirihiri" (Japanese: 思い出がヒリヒリ)	Satoshi Morota	Junko Kōmura	September 29, 2024
Shoma meets his great-uncle Dente Stomach, a Granute who took refuge in the human world and the one who performed the operation that gave him his powers. When Shoma fights the agents to protect the people, humans mistake him for a monster but Hanto steps in to defend him and Suga begins making a weapon to fight the Granute using some of Shoma's Gochizo, particularly Chocodon that he captured. At night, Hanto's mentor and adoptive father, Soji Shioya is assassinated by Granute during his investigation.
6	"Transformation Is Bitter Chocolate"; Transliteration: "Henshin wa Bitā Choko" (Japanese: 変身はビターチョコ)	Satoshi Morota	Junko Kōmura	October 6, 2024
Shoma starts living with Sachika, the latter of whom is responsible for giving the Gochizo their species' namesake. Although Sachika is still not aware that Gochizo are alive. Meanwhile, Hanto volunteers to undergo Suga's Kamen Rider system compatibility surgery to test his new invention, the Valenbuster, which he uses to transform into Kamen Rider Valen in order to avenge Shioya's death. Meanwhile, having becoming astonished by a prove of his previous mentor and great-uncle Dente's Kamen Rider system surgery on Shoma to be successful, Nyelv, one of Shoma's older brothers, decides to gather the Kamen Riders' combat data. Nyelv is also directly responsible for Hanto's path into a Kamen Rider, as he was the one who sent a Granute to kill Shioya, and steals Shioya's lower half of his Human Press state to him before Hanto finds Shioya's upper half.
7	"What Flavor Lies Underneath the Mask?"; Transliteration: "Kamen no Shita wa Don'na Aji" (Japanese: 仮面の下はどんな味)	Teruaki Sugihara	Junko Kōmura	October 13, 2024
Kamen Riders Gavv and Valen cooperate together to protect the citizens from the Granutes while keeping their identities a secret from each other. Meanwhile, Sachika and Shoma are asked to do housework at her grandaunt Masako Takarayashiki's mansion, and Hanto investigates another disappearance, where he is approached by Glotta, one of Shoma's older sisters.
8	"Dual Chocolate"; Transliteration: "Dyuaru Chokoreito" (Japanese: デュアル チョコレイト)	Teruaki Sugihara	Junko Kōmura	October 20, 2024
After rescuing the kidnapped girl, Shoma and Hanto are suspicious that the Granutes are still targeting the artists in Masako's mansion and keep watching over them. Even without transforming into a Granute form, Glotta can still defeat Valen single handledly during their first encounter, while also recalling how she knew Hanto lost his mother to a canine Granute. Meanwhile, the rest of the Stomach Family take heed of the Kamen Riders' interference and decide to come with measures against them. When Shoma manage to expose a Granute wno is sent to kidnap the artists, to his friends and clients, Sachika helps the Kamen Riders to counteract the Granute's newfound self-cloning ability.
9	"Trick or Dance!"; Transliteration: "Torikku Oa Dansu!" (Japanese: トリック オア ダンス！)	Takayuki Shibasaki	Kaori Kaneko	October 27, 2024
It's Halloween and Shoma is delighted by experimenting some sweets he never tasted before, which also gives birth to a new type of Gochizo. Meanwhile, Siita and Jiip decide to deal with Shoma personally after being fired by Lango, the eldest son in the Stomach Family.
10	"Extra Large! Candy Cannon!"; Transliteration: "Tokumori! Kyandi-hō!" (Japanese: 特盛り！キャンディ砲！)	Takayuki Shibasaki	Kaori Kaneko	November 10, 2024
Shoma once again gave birth to another new Gochizo. Shortly after, both Shoma and Hanto discovered the true identity of a Granute who kidnapped children to be a cake shop owner, who has the ability to turn a building complex he took over into a shell to assume full hermit crab-like form while carrying said hostages. After rescuing the children, Valen only reveals Gavv a little detail on how he became a Rider without slipping his secret identity to him, and also apologize for his creator's cause on kidnapping one of the Chocodon Gochizo to create his Rider power. Nevertheless, Gavv gives Valen several Chocodon Gochizo, believing that Valen is a Granute who did not have an ability to produce Gochizo like he was. Meanwhile, Suga recorded all of the Kamen Riders' combat data on his flash drive.
11	"Beware of Sweet Words!"; Transliteration: "Amai Kotoba ni Goyōjin!" (Japanese: あまい言葉にご用心！)	Kazuya Kamihoriuchi	Junko Kōmura	November 17, 2024
Hanto is suddenly being suspected for a romance scam, and decides to seek both Sachika and Shoma. As the scammer uses Hanto's profile picture on an online dating platform, Hanto pretends to go on a date with the woman who became the latest victim of the scam in order to find the culprit who framed him, with the help from the victim's younger sister. It is later revealed that a Granute disguised as a young boy was responsible behind the romance scam and framed Hanto. Meanwhile, Lango officially fires Siita and Jiip and decides to briefly visit Shoma. In the midst of the attack, Shoma comes to learn of Hanto's secret identity as Valen, when a Granute forced to detransform him.
12	"A Bond Connected by Doughnuts"; Transliteration: "Dōnatsu ga Tsunagu Kizuna" (Japanese: ドーナツがつなぐ絆)	Kazuya Kamihoriuchi	Junko Kōmura	November 24, 2024
Hanto is rescued by Shoma and in the occasion, his secret as Kamen Rider Valen has been revealed. Shoma decides to come clean by revealing his secret identity as Kamen Rider Gavv. After sharing each other's tragedies of losing their respective mothers at the hands of the Stomach Family and their Granute servants, they decide to keep working together against the Granutes. While arranging marriages for Siita and Jiip, both Lango and Glotta also captures a fugitive Granute into working for them. To replace the lost part timers, Lango instructs Glotta to hire new ones among those who are addicted to the Dark Treats and thus willing to do anything to get more of them.
13	"Promised Homemade Cake"; Transliteration: "Yakusoku no Tezukuri Kēki" (Japanese: 約束の手作りケーキ)	Teruaki Sugihara	Junko Kōmura	December 1, 2024
Having lost their jobs and forced to take part in arranged marriages by Lango, Siita and Jiip decide to take revenge on Shoma by fighting him personally.
14	"Miraculous Awakening! Caking"; Transliteration: "Kiseki no Kakusei! Kēkingu" (Japanese: 奇跡の覚醒！ケーキング)	Teruaki Sugihara	Junko Kōmura	December 8, 2024
Shoma survives Siita and Jiip's violent attacks but is badly wounded. The twins then begin threatening humans in order to draw him out and Shoma decides to face his siblings again, this time with a new type of Gochizo that gives him an enhanced, more powerful form, that he uses to defeat them, but Siita sacrifices herself to protect her twin brother from the final blow, leaving him devastated. Meanwhile, Suga meets an associate of his who happens to be Nyelv.
15	"Escaped Granute!"; Transliteration: "Dassō Guranyūto!" (Japanese: 脱走グラニュート！)	Satoshi Morota	Nobuniro Mouri (Note: Plot supervision by Junko Kōmura.)	December 15, 2024
Shoma meets a Granute who affirms that he is done associating himself with the Stomach Family and wants to be protected with them. Shoma is willing to help but Hanto insists that he is still an enemy to be destroyed, with the latter's suspicion of the Granute's plan to lure and capture both Kamen Riders is confirmed. Meanwhile, Jiip is devastated with his twin sister's death, and both Suga and Nyelv move on with their plans. Elsewhere, a recently hired Lage Nine begin his mission for Stomach Inc., having demonstrated his ability to capture multiple victims at once and earn him a higher rank within the company.
16	"The Gift of Noël"; Transliteration: "Noeru no Okurimono" (Japanese: ノエルのおくりもの)	Satoshi Morota	Nobuhiro Mouri	December 22, 2024
Having learnt his lesson not to be gullible, Shoma must rescue Hanto from being imprisoned to the Granute World. Although Lage Nine is made an employee of the month for his ability, he began to question his actions, and revealed his disinterest of eating Dark Treats. Shortly, Nyelv successfully created Vrastum Gear belt, then chose Lage Nine to become Kamen Rider Vram and promote him to be Stomach Inc.'s henchman.
17	"Caramel Tentacles Taste Like Happiness"; Transliteration: "Karameru Shokushu wa Kōfuku Aji" (Japanese: カラメる触手は幸福味)	Takayuki Shibasaki	Kaori Kaneko; Junko Kōmura	January 5, 2025
The Stomach Inc.'s next targets are "kind and gentle" people, and Sachika is believed to be in danger. While in a middle of hunting the Granute, Shoma and Hanto and are interrupted by Lage Nine, now Stomach Inc.'s own Kamen Rider.
18	"Extremely Strong! The Pudding Bodyguard"; Transliteration: "Gekitsuyo! Purin na Yōjinbō" (Japanese: 激強！プリンな用心棒)	Takayuki Shibasaki	Kaori Kaneko; Junko Kōmura	January 12, 2025
As both sides retreat, Shoma reveals to Hanto about the former's siblings. Despite Hanto's drawing saving most people from a disguised Granute, the Granute himself starts to have a breakdown into revealing his true form. While having too late to rescue one of the civilians both Shoma and Hanto prioritize; Lage Nine reveals his true intention why he let himself be recruited to Stomach Inc., defeating Hanto out of anger for being mistaken to be loyal to the company.
19	"The Secret Bittersweet Flavor of Pudding"; Transliteration: "Purin no Horoniga Kakushiaji" (Japanese: プリンのほろ苦隠し味)	Teruaki Sugihara	Junko Kōmura	January 19, 2025
It turns out that the Dark Treats took away the life of Lage Nine's younger brother Comel, the latter having developed an addiction for said confection. Lage Nine let himself be captured and forced to work for the company, in order to destroy it from inside and avenge his brother's death. However, upon realizing Lage Nine's true intention, Lango starts to regret recruiting him. Whilist Hanto is critically injured and being brought to Suga's lab, Shoma must confront Lage Nine by himself. Once everything settles down after revealing each other's tragic past for losing someone closest to them at the hands of Stomach Inc., Lage Nine reveals his true name, Rakia Amarga. Unbeknownst to Shoma, Suga took a sample of his hair without him noticing.
20	"Break In! To the Dark Treats Factory!"; Transliteration: "Totsunyū! Yamigashi Kōjō e!" (Japanese: 突入！闇菓子工場へ！)	Teruaki Sugihara	Junko Kōmura	January 26, 2025
Shoma convinces Rakia to help him infiltrate Stomach Inc. to rescue the captured civilians. Once there, they are confronted by Glotta who attacks them. Shoma and Rakia take the captives back to the human world where they are pursued by Glotta. In the occasion, Hanto recovers and rushes to help him, but hears from Glotta that Shoma is a member of the Stomach Family before she flees. An angry Hanto lashes at Shoma as he considers all Granute as enemies, including Shoma himself.
21	"Too Bitter Gavv"; Transliteration: "Bitā Sugiru Gavu" (Japanese: ビターすぎるガヴ)	Ryuta Tasaki	Junko Kōmura	February 2, 2025
After confronting Shoma, Hanto spots another individual resembling him who starts attacking humans, capable of transforming into Kamen Rider Bitter Gavv. Meanwhile, a now homeless Shoma is rescued by Dente after gradually lost his stamina. Additionally, Rakia, whose intention has been exposed is currently on the run, while remain keeping an eye on the Stomach Inc.'s activity on Earth.
22	"The Truth Is Sweet and Bitter"; Transliteration: "Shinjitsu wa Amaku Nigai" (Japanese: 真実は甘く苦い)	Ryuta Tasaki	Junko Kōmura	February 9, 2025
Hanto discovers that Shoma is not the one attacking humans, but rather a clone posing as him, who calls himself "Bitter Gavv". In the occasion, Shoma and Hanto reconcile and join forces against Bitter Gavv, while Rakia confronts Suga, certain that he is somehow involved.
23	"Broken Sweets"; Transliteration: "Burōkun Suītsu" (Japanese: ブロークンスイーツ)	Satoshi Morota	Junko Kōmura	February 16, 2025
After destroying Bitter Gavv, Shoma regains the memory of his encounter with Hanto's mother, Sae, and tells him all the truth he knows about how she died after the Stomach Inc. captured her. As Shoma had no strength to stop Lango from killing Sae, and her death in front of him is the reason he begin to understand what his mother, Michiru warned him about the Dark Treats, a similarly despaired Hanto tells Shoma not to blame himself for what happened to her. While Hanto retreats to Suga where he gains four new Gochizo, Shoma introduces Rakia to Dente, who then reveal the latter two how he co-founded Stomach Inc. with his brother, Zomb, and how the Dark Treats were first created. Dente admit that he was unaware of his brother's criminal activity on using humans as secret ingredients for the Dark Treats, and his evil influence affects his descendants, barring Shoma. Shortly, Shoma gets surprised when Bitter Gavv reappears, declaring himself immortal. As it turns out, Suga created more than one Bitter Gavv clones.
24	"A Spoonful of Revival Ice Cream"; Transliteration: "Fukkatsu no Aisu Hitosaji" (Japanese: 復活のアイスひとさじ)	Satoshi Morota	Junko Kōmura	February 23, 2025
Shoma fails to stop the second Bitter Gavv clone's rampage. While Shoma recovers, Dente is spared by Rakia, out of guilt for his unwittingly involvement of the Dark Treats' creations that led to Comel's death, and gave him a Gavvphone like the one used by Shoma. In midst of Bitter Gavv's next attack, Sachika gives Shoma some ice cream which unlocks a new Gochizo that gives him another powerful form to fight back. Meanwhile, Hanto begin to use a new Gochizo he received from Suga while fighting a difficult Granute, who wants to avenge his fallen friend whom Hanto killed during his first time as a Kamen Rider.
25	"Virtual Happiness, the Taste of Nectar"; Transliteration: "Kyozō no Shiawase Mitsu no Aji" (Japanese: 虚像の幸せ 蜜の味)	Takayuki Shibasaki	Nobuhiro Mouri	March 2, 2025
Rakia begins working for Hapipare by Shoma and Sachika's recommendation and suspects that a Granute must be targeting children and Rakia himself, revealing not only he steals someone's VTuber account for a crime the young human boy never committed, but has an information regarding Comel's demise at the hands of Stomach Inc. Meanwhile, Hanto notices that his body is becoming strange since he began using the new Gochizo provided by Suga.
26	"Angry Pudding"; Transliteration: "Ikari no Puttsun Purin" (Japanese: 怒りのぷっつんプリン)	Takayuki Shibasaki	Nobuhiro Mouri	March 9, 2025
Koji Minamoto, who reveals himself to be the original Kabutodanshi (Helmet Boy), wants to get his VTube persona account back from a Granute who stole it, and asks Rakia to accompany him again, but he refuses, saying that humans are no match for him. Koji gets angry and runs off on his own, triggering Rakia to change his mind after seeing the late Comel in the former, and successfully helped him retrieve his Kabutodanshi account from a Granute who stole it. Elsewhere, Hanto, whose body becomes weaker by the side effect of a black Gochizo finds out Suga's true intentions, upon seeing him interacting with one of the Bitter Gavvs.
27	"Sour and Sweet to the Point of Burning"; Transliteration: "Sui mo Amai mo Kogasu Hodo" (Japanese: 酸いも甘いも焦がす程)	Teruaki Sugihara	Junko Kōmura	March 23, 2025
As Hanto's condition becomes critical, Shoma and Sachika escort him to Dente, in hopes to find a cure to negate the side effects of Suga's dark Gochizo in him. Realizing whom Suga is, and the side effect of a transformation device created by him to humans, despite using Gochizo created from Shoma's Gavv being semi-safe, Dente warns Hanto not to transform into a Rider for the time being. In response, Dente borrows Rakia's Vrastum Gear which Nyelv created, to find a way to reverse engineer the transformation side effects for both human and Granute users, while also create a second gear for Hanto's safe use. As Suga's true intentions have been exposed, he builds his own transformation device to transform himself into Kamen Rider Bake, challenges Shoma to a fight, and attempts to take Hanto back. To make matters worse, Suga was involved in Shioya's death, and have since experimented on humans before Hanto around twenty years ago. As Shoma and a recently heartbroken Hanto retreat, Suga begins to experience a side effect of his own Rider transformation while lamenting his actual age.
28	"Chocolate Frappe of Bonds!"; Transliteration: "Kizuna no Choko Furappe!" (Japanese: 絆のチョコフラッペ！)	Teruaki Sugihara	Junko Kōmura	March 30, 2025
In hopes to break Hanto free from his regret of unknowingly leading Shioya to his death, Shoma treats him to a chocolate frappe as the means to comfort him. With their bond re-strengthened, a new Gochizo is created for Hanto's safe use against Suga, with Rakia beginning his assault on Suga's laboratory to prevent Bitter Gavv from being mass produced. As Suga's cloning lab is destroyed, it appears that Suga harbored a dark past relating to a baby boy he raised before the child passed away, driving him to become a mad scientist. As Suga is dying after being defeated by a newly upgraded Valen, and his Rider power took a toll on his body, he entrusts his mourning comrade, Nyelv, to continue his work in his stead.
29	"Jiip's Surprise Wedding!"; Transliteration: "Jīpu no Dengeki Kekkon!" (Japanese: ジープの電撃結婚！)	Satoshi Morota	Junko Kōmura	April 6, 2025
One month after Suga's defeat and death, Jiip returns and introduces his fiancée named Lizel Jaldak, the daughter of Bocca, the president of the Granute World. Jiip reveals that Lizel was the one who saved his life, preventing him from committing suicide due to his grief over Siita's death, along with Lizel getting her Mimic Key from Nyelv at her behest. In truth, Jiip secretly uses this opportunity to make all his siblings suffer for leading Siita to her death at Shoma's hand. At the same time, Rakia uses the late Suga's former hideout as his new permanent home. Shortly, Shoma and Rakia become temporary basketball players while searching for their affiliated team's missing players. Upon learning that Shoma has human grandparents from his mother's side, and believing they might still be around on Earth, Hanto pursues them at Shoma's stead.
30	"The Most Terrible Presidential Daughter"; Transliteration: "Saikyō no Daitōryō Reijō" (Japanese: 最凶の大統領令嬢)	Satoshi Morota	Junko Kōmura	April 13, 2025
After the Kamen Riders are being introduced to Lizel by Jiip, they continue to find the Granute who poses as a bathhouse owner, a culprit who lures a winning basketball team into his trap. Shortly, thanks to his connection to the Jaldaks, Jiip becomes a new vice president of Stomach Inc., with Lizel as its new CEO. However, to Lango's dismay, he is demoted to Jiip and Siita's former positions as the company's ingredient procurement.
31	"A Marriage of Spicy and Bitter"; Transliteration: "Kara Niga Mariāju" (Japanese: 辛苦マリアージュ)	Kazuya Kamihoriuchi	Hiroki Uchida	April 20, 2025
During a hunt for a Granute who is under new Stomach Inc.'s parole, while searching for the location where Shoma's late mother formerly live, the targeted Granute who disguised as a barber shop trapped Hanto and Rakia's hands with his ability. To break their arms free, both Hanto and Rakia must settle their differences and work together to defeat the targeted Granute. Though both Hanto and Rakia find the way to use one of the targeted Granute's abilities to free themselves, but unable to catch him, Rakia recognizes a slash mark which the targeted Granute left behind as the same mark that inflicted Comel when he died. Meanwhile, Shoma finds another Granute who dressed as an elegant butler and assault humans. However, the butler who reveals to be belonged to Lizel overwhelms Shoma before Lizel herself appears again and invite Shoma for a brief talk, elsewhere.
32	"Cup on the True Feelings!"; Transliteration: "Hon'ne o Kappu On!" (Japanese: 本音をカップオン！)	Kazuya Kamihoriuchi	Hiroki Uchida	April 27, 2025
Rakia realized that the Granute he recently encountered appears to be involved with Comel's death, and decides to hunt him down, personally, with Hanto's help. Despite having defeated the Granute, both Rakia and Hanto learn that said Granute did not kill Comel. At the same time, Shoma is invited by Lizel for a brief talk where the former learn of Jaldak's take over of the Stomach Inc. Dente is confronted by his nephew and former disciple, Nyelv, who offers him to come and work alongside him, only for Dente to reject his offer. Shortly, Magen, a wealthy Granute who is succumbed to the Dark Treats' addiction offers his aid to Jaldak-Stomach family in exchange for the confectionery, but requires special treatment from Nyelv.
33	"One-Hit Kill!! Over Gavv!"; Transliteration: "Ichigekihissatsu!! Ōbā Gavu!" (Japanese: 一撃必殺！！オーバーガヴ！)	Takayuki Shibasaki	Junko Kōmura	May 4, 2025
Magen has been chosen to become a first known Kamen Rider Bitter Gavv who is not a Shoma clone, and adopts the Kamen Rider Bake form. Magen tests his newfound Rider power on the heroic Kamen Riders. In a critical situation, Dente begins to create a new powerful Gochizo for Shoma. Sachika gives the new Gochizo to Shoma while he faces off against Magen, who had attacked Hanto and faced off against Rakia, prior to Shoma's arrival at the scene. Shoma uses the Gochizo created by Dente and defeats Magen with one punch.
34	"The Great 100 Gochizo Operation!"; Transliteration: "Hyappiki Gochizō Dai Sakusen!" (Japanese: 100匹ゴチゾウ大作戦！)	Takayuki Shibasaki	Junko Kōmura	May 11, 2025
To transform into Over Gavv again, Shoma must fill the Gochipod with 100 Gochizo. Shoma concentrates on eating sweets, while Hanto and Rakia face Magen. Meanwhile, Glotta clashes with Lizel at Stomach Inc. A confrontation ensues, but Jiip pleads with Glotta, "I need Lizel!", Shoma is trying his best to eat sweets, but he is unable to produce any Gochizo. It turns out, Dente took out one of his teeth from his Gavv to create Shoma's Gochipod. Hanto and Rakia eventually defeat Magen.
35	"Zero Sweetness! Ironclad Lango"; Transliteration: "Amasa Zero! Teppeki no Rango" (Japanese: 甘さゼロ！鉄壁のランゴ)	Teruaki Sugihara	Junko Kōmura	May 18, 2025
A series of mass disappearances have occurred again. Shoma, who had been busy with Ritsu's request, is suddenly joined by Hanto and Rakia. Rakia, who was involved in the previous mass disappearance, suspects Lango's presence in this case as well, After receiving a report from the Gochizo, Shoma discovers Agents attacking people on a plane. He transforms into Gavv, but then Lango appears and delivers a powerful blow to him, knocking him out of his transformation. Hanto and Rakia, who rush to the scene, also transform into Riders and boldly confront Lango, but cost Rakia's Rider equipment to be rendered useless upon being defeated.
36	"Turnaround! Awakening! Master Gavv"; Transliteration: "Gyakuten! Kakusei! Masutā Gavu" (Japanese: 逆転！覚醒！マスターガヴ)	Teruaki Sugihara	Junko Kōmura	May 25, 2025
Realizing that Lango's true target is a live concert which Ritsu looked forward to, Shoma must confront his oldest brother by himself. Greatly determined to protect humanity who accepted him, the Gochipod begins to glow in dazzle, granting Kamen Rider Gavv a new powerful form and help him in his fight against Lango, who he eventually defeats.
37	"I Have Never Forgotten"; Transliteration: "Wasureta Koto wa Nai" (Japanese: 忘れたことはない)	Satoshi Morota	Nobuhiro Mouri	June 1, 2025
A family-owned wagashi shop owner's son whom Shoma recently met, Hiroto Ando, asks Hapipare for assistance to revitalize his shop, while Hanto learns a bit about him and his late father from a wagashi craftsman named Kenji Saito. While Jiip uses Lango's defeat as an excuse to avenge Siita by assaulting Shoma, Hanto happens to encounter the same Granute who took away his mother, Sae, and learn that the Granute he sought is actually Kenji all along.
38	"The Other Side of Hatred"; Transliteration: "Nikushimi no Mukōgawa" (Japanese: 憎しみの向こう側)	Satoshi Morota	Nobuhiro Mouri	June 8, 2025
Kenji is revealed to be the Granute who kidnapped Hanto's mother, but has somehow reformed since learning about the incident that led to her death at the hands of Lango and ultimately the truth behind the Dark Treats' secret ingredients. Realizing the fate between him and Hanto has come, Kenji crafts a final confectionery for Hiroto before confronting Hanto one last time. Jiip reluctantly accepts Nyelv's suggestion to become the third Kamen Rider Bitter Gavv to go on par with Shoma and the other Rider-powered individuals. During the fight between Kenji and Hanto, the latter spares Kenji, as he felt by killing him, Hiroto will end up all alone. However Kenji ends up being executed by Glotta on sight.
39	"Even Though I Was Looking for You"; Transliteration: "Sagashimotometeita no ni" (Japanese: 探し求めていたのに)	Shojiro Nakazawa	Junko Kōmura	June 15, 2025
While his friends are making a pudding a la mode for Shoma to grant Rakia a new power up per Dente's request, Rakia soon finds out that Glotta was the one who murdered Comel, and Dente becomes her latest victim.
40	"The Reminiscent À la Mode"; Transliteration: "Tsuioku no A Ra Mōdo" (Japanese: 追憶のアラモード)	Shojiro Nakazawa	Junko Kōmura	June 22, 2025
Worried about Rakia's well-being after Glotta is revealed to have killed Comel and recently Dente, Shoma must help him to defeat her. In the midst of struggle, a pudding a la mode Shoma ate has finally created a new Gochizo for Rakia to use against Glotta, who Rakia ends up defeating. After succumbing to her injuries, Glotta finds out that Lango had been faking his death the entire time before dying in his arms.
41	"Glasses Creeping Closer"; Transliteration: "Nijiriyoru Megane" (にじり寄る眼鏡)	Takayuki Shibasaki	Junko Kōmura	June 29, 2025
Several days after Glotta's demise, Nyelv is summoned by Bocca to an important meeting, revealing that the Jaldak has retrieved a corpse of someone who is close to Nyelv and planning to resurrect him. Shortly Hanto goes to a candy shop which Shoma frequently visits, and the owner reveals to be Shoma's long-lost uncle, Masaru. Suddenly, people are starting to act strange and hypnotized by an unknown assailant. Nyelv then later reveals himself alongside a hooded assailant. The said assailant is revealed to be a resurrected Kenzo Suga, who is now a half-Granute and a Bitter Gavv. Nyelv explained he kept Suga alive in a stasis. Until Bocca killed his competitor and bring his corpse to Nyelv, and later inheriting the power and body parts of Bocca's competitor during the process of becoming a Bitter Gavv.
42	"At the End of Broken Feelings"; Transliteration: "Wareta Omoi no Hate ni" (Japanese: 割れた思いの果てに)	Takayuki Shibasaki	Junko Kōmura	July 6, 2025
Hanto is brainwashed by a resurrected Suga's new power up, and both Shoma and Rakia must stop Nyelv and Suga's next plans and free Hanto. They soon find out that the source of the brainwashing comes from the Bake Magnum and must destroy it to free everyone including Masaru. Without having any other choice, Rakia uses his Granute form to negate Bake Magnum's effects at once before catching up with Shoma, while Hanto breaks free from the brainwashed state. Knowing that Suga must be put out of his misery, the Kamen Riders finish him, and destroy the Bake Magnum to free the civilians. Nyelv, however, escapes. Following the incident, Masaru begins to research Kamen Riders and Granutes, the latter of whom are responsible for the disappearance of his sister, Michiru, while Hanto reveals to Shoma that Masaru is Shoma's uncle after Masaru sends him a photo of Michiru.
43	"What Does the Human World Taste Like?"; Transliteration: "Ningen-kai wa Don'na Aji" (Japanese: 人間界はどんな味？)	Satoshi Morota	Nobuhiro Mouri	July 13, 2025
When Masaru visits Hapipare, Shoma becomes hesitant to reveal his identity to him, with Hanto also hesitant to help Shoma confirm his relation to his human uncle. While Jiip trains his Rider power under Nyelv's supervision, Bocca ultimately confronts the Kamen Riders in person, and challenges them to a fight.
44	"A Dazzling Moment That Will Never Come Back"; Transliteration: "Mabushikute Modoranai Shunkan" (Japanese: まぶしくて戻らない瞬間)	Teruaki Sugihara	Saburo Yatsude	July 20, 2025
Shoma unexpectedly meets Hajime Hiroi, the boy who first found him stranded in the human world and helped him adjust to the human world. Before starting to hunt for humans, a new part-timer Granute begins to watch Nyelv's part-timer tutorial. Hanto visits Rakia for information about Bocca and his illegal activities, having been warned that the election will be held soon; Rakia reveals that Bocca has been known to kill his past associates. Before going to assault a new part-timer Granute who is at a brink of redemption, Nyelv investigates the possibilities of alternate dimensions through the Door Space that was created before Stomach Inc. was found, with one world similar to the primary Kamen Rider Gavv world. Hanto arrives in time to save a recently redeemed part-timer Granute, but is unable to defeat Nyelv. It is also revealed that Lango killed Bouche, leading to Shoma's escape to Earth following Michiru's death. Nyelv then found one of Shoma's Gochizo, threatening to eat it in order to use the trail of its tears to find Shoma. The final scene then goes to an alternate world similar to Gavv's that would lead to the events of Invaders of the House of Snacks, where both humans and Granutes coexist peacefully, Dark Treats never existed, the Stomach Family are heroes, Hanto and Rakia have different jobs, and a counterpart of Shoma named Taorin works for Hapipare. Lastly, the scene cuts back to a hideout of Caries, where he is plotting his next evil plan like he did to other worlds.
45	"I Won't Let Anyone Take Them Away Anymore"; Transliteration: "Mō Dare ni mo Ubawasenai" (Japanese: もう誰にも奪わせない)	Teruaki Sugihara	Junko Kōmura	July 27, 2025
Concerned from witnessing Rakia's true Granute form after saving civilians from zombie Suga's mind control, Sachika decides to see him in person while he is at his true form with Hanto's help. As the Granute presidential election is approaching, Nyelv finds Shoma while presenting the offer of defeating Bocca and destroying the Dark Treats' production from the inside, under the condition that Shoma must return to the Granute World.
46	"Shoma's Determination"; Transliteration: "Ketsui no Shōma" (Japanese: 決意のショウマ)	Teruaki Sugihara	Junko Kōmura	August 3, 2025
Shoma accepts Nyelv's proposal and infiltrates the Granute World. In order to defeat Bocca, he follows a plan laid out by Nyelv and heads for the president's office alone. Meanwhile, in the human world, Hanto, Rakia, and Sachika are scrambling to bring Shoma back. Lango, then confronts Shoma's friends and forms temporary truce against Bocca, just like Nyelv did. Nyelv also recalled the worst thing his grandfather, Zomb did to him and his family from his mother's side. Although Shoma attempts to fire back Bocca with another mind control infused Bake Magnum, it did not work on the latter. However, Hanto and Rakia arrive on time to grab Shoma and retreat.
47	"Happy Dystopia"; Transliteration: "Shiawase no Disutopia" (Japanese: 幸せのディストピア)	Shojiro Nakazawa	Junko Kōmura	August 10, 2025
Shoma's friends scold him for recklessly facing Bocca alone, telling him that he is not alone anymore. With no time to waste, the Kamen Riders must stop the Jaldak's operations, and somehow found Nyelv injured after his coup was exposed. The Riders learn that not only Nyelv took samples from Bocca's rival, but also Rakia's Granute power, which are used to mass produce mind control Dummy Gochizo per Bocca's order. Rakia secures Sachika and Masaru by turning them into Human Presses earlier to prevent the Dummy Gochizo's mind control, then faces Jiip. At the same time, Shoma and Hanto are forced to watch Bocca reverse Nyelv's bomb set up, killing the latter.
48	"Burning Amazingummy"; Transliteration: "Moero Ameijingumi" (Japanese: 燃えろアメイジングミ)	Shojiro Nakazawa	Junko Kōmura	August 17, 2025
Lango decides to step in to temporarily help the Kamen Riders against Bocca. In the midst of a struggling battle, Kamen Rider Gavv recalls the natural Granute diet he learned from Rakia, allowing to use his Rider power by consuming both pebbles and gummy at once and gain a new power to defeat Bocca.
49	"I Believe in Snacks"; Transliteration: "Ore wa Okashi o Shinjiteru" (Japanese: 俺はお菓子を信じてる)	Satoshi Morota	Junko Kōmura	August 24, 2025
After Bocca's defeat, Lango continues his original agenda and takes over the late Granute president's current operations through the use of the new Bake Magnum. Before the Kamen Riders head over to Stomach Inc. to save the captured civilians, Shoma must face Lango by himself again, while Rakia takes on the agents, and Hanto is chased by Jiip and Lizel at the Door Space, then on Earth. Along the way, Shoma and Masaru reveal each others' true identities while creating batches of Gochizo to cure brainwashed victims before they are turned into Human Presses.
50 (Finale)	"Aim for It! A Delicious Future!"; Transliteration: "Mezase! Oishii Mirai!" (Japanese: 目指せ！おいしい未来！)	Satoshi Morota	Junko Kōmura	August 31, 2025
With the final battle for the fates of both the human and Granute worlds entering its climax, the Kamen Riders must defeat their enemies in their desperate struggles, once and for all. Shoma becomes the last surviving Stomach bloodline after he and Hanto killed Lango and Jiip respectively. However, Rakia and his Puddinte Gochizo decide to remain in the Granute world after destroying the gates, and then sends his two personal gelatin Gochizo to Earth where Shoma's human family are before the gates are destroyed, causing a now widowed Lizel and the surviving former part-time Granute agents to be stranded on earth. After defeating Lango, Shoma leaves a bag of gummy candy on the location where his half-brother was slain. As peace has been restored in both worlds, Rakia returns his usual rock mining occupation where his home world will have a new Granute president, Shoma is embraced by Masaru, while Hanto writes a journal about the Dark Treats and the Granutes, which ultimately leads to the creation of Light Treats in response. While doing his delivery job, Shoma passes by a man who happens to be the next Kamen Rider, after he gave him his associated Rider Gochizo.
