= 10 Things I Want to Do Before I Turn 40 =

Japanese manga series

- Cover of vol. 1 of the Japanese version, first released on February 9, 2023
- Genre: Boys' love
- Manga
- Written by: Mamita
- Published by: Libre
- English publisher: NA: Seven Seas Entertainment
- Imprint: BBC Deluxe
- Magazine: Magazine Be × Boy
- Original run: June 7, 2022 – present
- Volumes: 2
- Television drama
- Directed by: Chihiro Ikeda; Noriyoshi Kosuge
- Produced by: Rina Sobue
- Written by: Yō Saitō
- Music by: Erina Koyama
- Studio: Stardust Pictures
- Licensed by: GagaOOLala
- Original network: TV Tokyo
- Original run: July 5, 2025 – September 20, 2025
- Episodes: 12
- icon

10 Things I Want to Do Before I Turn 40 (Japanese: 40までにしたい10のこと, Hepburn: Yonjū Made ni Shitai Jū no Koto) is a Japanese manga series by Mamita. It was serialized in the monthly boys' love manga magazine Magazine Be × Boy since June 7, 2022.

A live-action television drama adaptation was broadcast on TV Tokyo from July 5, 2025, to September 20, 2025, as part of their Drama 24 programming block.

== Plot ==
In three months, salaryman Suzume Tōjō will turn 40 years old. Having a midlife crisis, Suzume creates a list of 10 things he wants to do before he reaches that age, as follows:

1. Have a takoyaki party
2. Sample all the cakes from the department store food markets
3. Find a personal style
4. Go to Harajuku
5. Try Hyappikiya's parfait
6. Get a custom-made luxury pillow
7. Make a special customization of a menu item
8. Find a lover
9. Share a kiss
10. Spend my birthday with a lover

Suzume's list is discovered by Keishi Tanaka, his subordinate and a popular employee at his company. Keishi confesses to Suzume that he, like Suzume, is gay, and that he will help him complete the list as his boyfriend. As Suzume completes each task with Keishi, each experience has him discover a new side to him, and eventually he develops a romantic attraction to him.

== Characters ==
Suzume Tōjō (十条 雀, Tōjō Suzume)
Voiced by: Atsushi Abe (drama CD)
Portrayed by: Shunsuke Kazama (TV drama)
Suzume is a 39-year-old salaryman approaching his 40s. He has not had a girlfriend in 10 years. As his name means "sparrow" in Japanese, Suzume collects sparrow plushies. Mamita described him as a "goofball" who "makes lists based on what he sees on television."
Keishi Tanaka (田中 慶司, Tanaka Keishi)
Voiced by: Takuya Eguchi (drama CD)
Portrayed by: Kohei Shoji (TV drama)
Keishi is Suzume's subordinate at work and also 10 years younger than him. While he pretends to be a playboy around women, he is in love with Suzume. He has a carefree personality. Keishi has two older sisters who taught him how to cook.
Suzuko (すず子)
Suzuko is a cushion designed as a sparrow. Suzume often has imaginary conversations with her.

== Media ==
=== Manga ===
10 Things I Want to Do Before I Turn 40 was written and illustrated by Mamita. It was serialized in the monthly boys' love manga magazine Magazine Be × Boy since the July 2022 issue released on June 7, 2022. The chapters were later released in two bound volumes by Libre under the BBC Deluxe imprint. The volume release featured several illustration revisions and included three new short stories.

In October 2024, Seven Seas Entertainment announced that they had licensed the series for North American distribution in English.

In 2023, Mamita stated through an interview with Chil Chil that they focused on showing how creating a list could change a mundane daily routine. The cover illustration of the first volume shows Suzume fulfilling a task on his list that did not appear in the manga. In April 2025, Mamita stated during a fan event that they had wanted to create a story depicting an older man, but they later felt that the story would not work well if the main character was 39 or 40 years old, so they instead made him a 37-year-old man who worked with his subordinate to accomplish things before he became 40 years old. Initially, Mamita had wanted to create a subgenre called "older man succubus" (おじキュバス) and the story was originally conceived as a science fiction story that featured a Western-looking older man succubus descending to Earth.

No.	Original release date	Original ISBN	English release date	English ISBN
1	February 9, 2023	9784799761328	May 6, 2025	9798893732894
2	February 19, 2025	9784799770689	September 1, 2026	9798898634001

=== Audio drama ===
An audio drama adapting the manga was released onto CD by Libre under the Cue Egg Label. The first volume was released on April 12, 2025, with its limited edition featuring a manga booklet.

=== Television drama ===
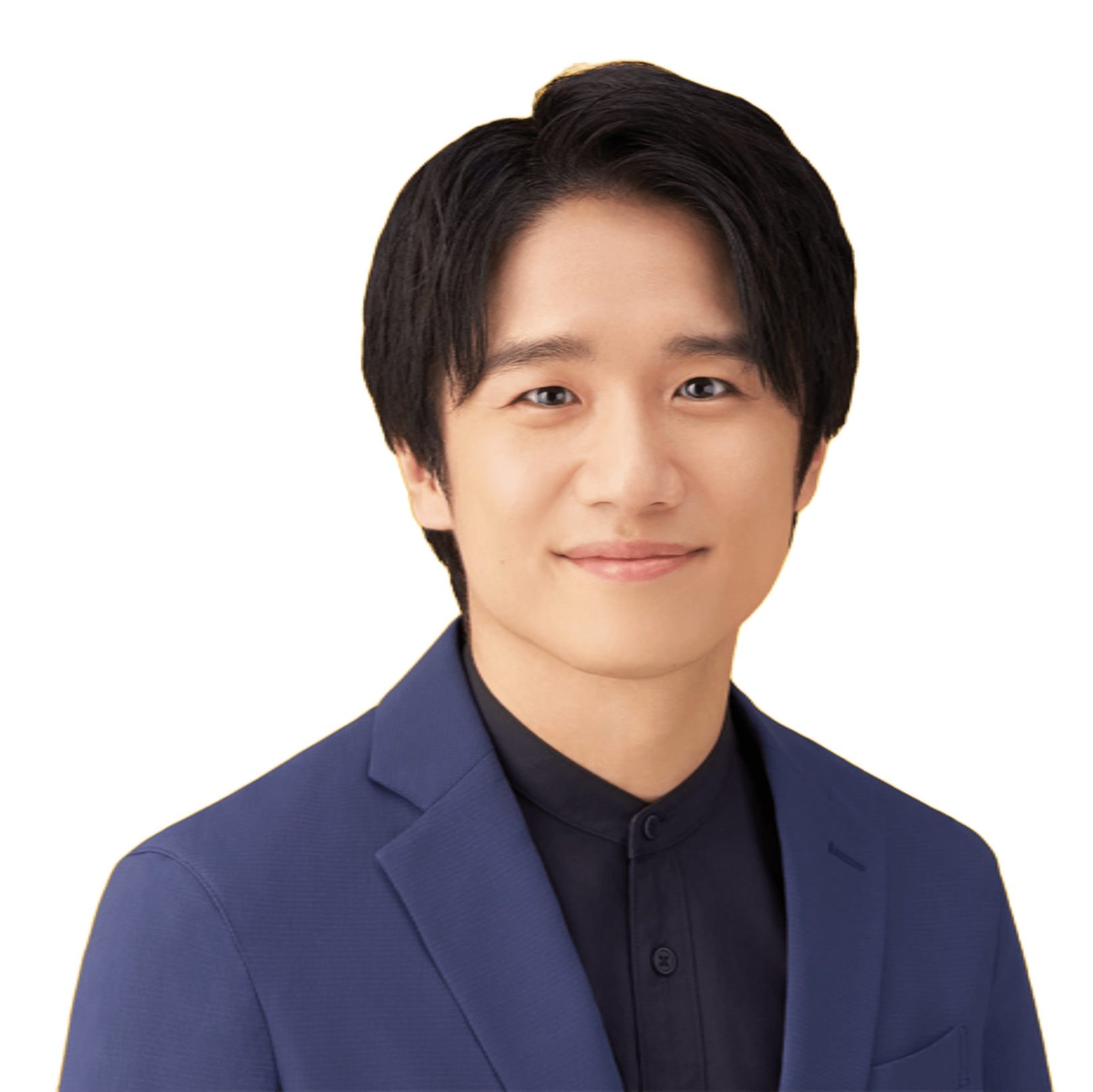
Shunsuke Kazama (pictured in 2024) portrayed Suzume in the live-action drama adaptation.

A live-action television drama adaptation of 10 Things I Want to Do Before I Turn 40 was announced on May 28, 2025. It was broadcast on TV Tokyo as part of their Drama 24 programming block from July 5, 2025, (Note: TV Tokyo lists the broadcast date as July 4, 2025, at 24:12, which is July 5, 2025, at 12:12 AM.) to September 20, 2025, with a total of 12 episodes. Additional broadcasts include TV Osaka, Television Saitama, TV Aichi, TV Setouchi, Television Hokkaido, and TV Kyushu. The series is directed by Chihiro Ikeda and Noriyoshi Kosuge, with Yō Saitō in charge of the script and Erina Koyama in charge of music. The opening theme song is "Sumire" by Chevon and the ending theme is "Maboroshi" by The Shes Gone. It was streamed internationally outside of Japan, Taiwan, South Korea, and Thailand through GagaOOLala.

Producer Rina Sobue stated that in an interview with The Television that a live-action television drama adaptation of 10 Things I Want to Do Before I Turn 40 had been heavily requested, and the manga's publisher Libre had given the rights to TV Tokyo, having been impressed with their late-night television dramas. Several office scenes depicted in the show were created for the drama adaptation, and episode 8 featured original screenplay.

The series stars Shunsuke Kazama as Suzume and Kohei Shoji as Keishi. Sobue stated that Kazama was the top choice for Suzume though internal staff discussions, due to his age and because the director, Ikeda, had previously worked with him in the live-action television drama adaptation of the manga Hatsukoi, Zarari. The staff chose Shōji for the role of Keishi, describing his audition as "relaxed, yet sincere."

Additional cast members include Amon Hirai as Kaede Tanaka, Riko Takayama as Akane Utagawa, and Keisuke Watanabe as Shō Yoshizawa. Sobue stated that their roles had expanded from the original manga, and that Takayama had also been cast at the insistence of Ikeda, who had also worked with her in Hatsukoi, Zarari. Yūki Hirako from the comedy duo Alco & Peace was cast as Keisuke Kuroki, an original character created for the drama adaptation. Sobue had created the character while imagining Hirako working at an advertising agency and had personally asked him to play the role. Voice actress Kotono Mitsuishi provides the voice of Suzuko. Sobue asked Mitsuishi to play the role, likening her to her roles as Misato Katsuragi from Neon Genesis Evangelion and Usagi Tsukino from Sailor Moon, and that she had cast Mitsuishi as Suzuko because Suzuko "watched over" Suzume just as Misato had watched over Shinji Ikari and how Sailor Moon had "been by [her] side since childhood."

==== Episodes ====
No.	Title	Directed by	Written by	Original release date
1	"Between a Boss and His Subordinate... a Sudden Office Love!"; Transliteration: "Joshi to Buka... Totsuzen no Ofisu Rabu!" (Japanese: 上司と部下...突然のオフィスラブ!)	Chihiro Ikeda	Yō Saitō	July 5, 2025
2	"The Finger that Wiped Sauce From My Face"; Transliteration: ""Sōsu, Tsuiteru" Fureru Yubisaki" (Japanese: 「ソース、ついてる」触れる指先)	Chihiro Ikeda	Yō Saitō	July 12, 2025
3	"A Sudden Rainfall, With Wet Hair and Lips"; Transliteration: "Totsuzen no Ame, Nureru Kami to Kuchibiru" (Japanese: 突然の雨、濡れる髪と唇)	Chihiro Ikeda	Yō Saitō	July 19, 2025
4	"A Man I Know From My Past Appears"; Transliteration: "Kako o Shiru Otoko, Tōjō" (Japanese: 過去を知る男、登場)	Noriyoshi Kosuge	Chihiro Ikeda, Yō Saitō	July 26, 2025
5	"Since When Has He Been in Love With Me...?"; Transliteration: "Aitsu, Itsu Kara Ore no Koto o...?" (Japanese: あいつ、いつから俺のことを...?)	Chihiro Ikeda	Yō Saitō	August 2, 2025
6	"Did You Only Plan on Eating Cake?"; Transliteration: "Kēki Taberu Dake no Tsumori Datta?" (Japanese: ケーキ食べるだけのつもりだった?)	Noriyoshi Kosuge	Yō Saitō	August 9, 2025
7	"A Custom-made Luxury Pillow"; Transliteration: "Ōdā Meido no Yabai Makura" (Japanese: オーダーメイドのヤバい枕)	Chihiro Ikeda	Yō Saitō	August 16, 2025
8	"Things I Realized While We Can't See Each Other"; Transliteration: "Aenai Jikan de Kizuita Koto" (Japanese: 会えない時間で気付いたこと)	Noriyoshi Kosuge	Chihiro Ikeda, Yō Saitō	August 23, 2025
9	"An Unlikely Meeting"; Transliteration: "Masaka no, Hachiawase" (Japanese: まさかの、鉢合わせ)	Chihiro Ikeda	Yō Saitō	August 30, 2025
10	"Barbeque at Home!"; Transliteration: "O-uchi de Bābekyū!" (Japanese: おうちでバーベキュー!)	Noriyoshi Kosuge	Yō Saitō	September 6, 2025
11	"I Don't Want to Regret This Anymore"; Transliteration: "Mou Kōkai wa Shitakunai no ni" (Japanese: もう後悔はしたくないのに)	Chihiro Ikeda	Yō Saitō	September 13, 2025
12	"Spending My Birthday With My Lover"; Transliteration: "Tanjōbi o Koibito to Sugosu" (Japanese: 誕生日を恋人と過ごす)	Chihiro Ikeda	Yō Saitō	September 20, 2025

== Reception ==
10 Things I Want to Do Before I Turn 40 sold over 750,000 physical copies in 2025. It won the 2024 Digital Comic Award by Comic CMoa in the BL category and Best Comic at the 2024 Chil Chil BL Award.
