= Kohei Shoji =

Japanese actor

- 庄司 浩平
- Born: October 28, 1999 (age 26); Tokyo, Japan
- Occupations: Actor, Model
- Years active: 2019–present
- Agent: Oscar Promotion
- Website: https://shojikohei.com/

Kohei Shoji (庄司 浩平, Shōji Kōhei, born October 28, 1999) is a Japanese actor and model. He is known for his roles in the tokusatsu series Mashin Sentai Kiramager, Kamen Rider Gavv and the drama series 10 Things I Want to Do Before I Turn 40.

== Early life ==
Shoji was born in Tokyo, Japan, on October 28, 1999. He has an older brother, two years his senior.

He was scouted by a talent agency while riding a train, which prompted the start of his entertainment career.

== Career ==
Shoji began auditioning for acting roles in the late 2010s and gradually expanded his presence in television and film. He was selected through an audition to appear in Mashin Sentai Kiramager (2021), marking one of his earliest notable roles.

Despite this early break, Shoji faced considerable challenges and stated that he “was rejected countless times,” often feeling unseen even while acknowledging his own lack of experience. At one point, he came close to giving up acting entirely and considered pursuing professional qualifications as an alternative path. His situation changed when he passed the public audition for the drama Kimi to Yukite Saku: Shinsengumi Seishunroku, in which he was cast as Hajime Saitō.

Following this role, Shoji gained further recognition when he was selected through another audition to portray Rakia Amarga / Kamen Rider Vrum in Kamen Rider Gavv, which significantly raised his public profile. He was subsequently chosen from more than 150 applicants to play Keishi Tanaka in the series 10 Things I Want to Do Before I Turn 40, securing the part through a competitive audition process.

Shoji also explored opportunities in fashion modeling and traveled independently to Milan and Paris to audition for their respective fashion weeks, though these attempts did not lead to major outcomes.

== Personal life ==
Shoji started playing basketball in the third grade of elementary school and continued to play throughout his schooling His deep passion for the sport remains, as he is an avid NBA fan and supports the Miami Heat. He also supports Japan's domestic competition, the B.League, where he has worked as a commentator for broadcasts and served as a special reporter creating content for the league's social media.

He is also a devoted fan of Marvel movies and characters. His interest extends to a long-term career goal: he has stated that he seriously hopes to one day be a part of the Avengers, noting that many heroes shine brightest in their 40s.

In addition to acting and modeling, his hobbies and skills include English conversation, cooking, writing, reading, and listening to Showa-era pop songs (Kayōkyoku).

== Filmography ==
=== Television ===
- Mashin Sentai Kiramager (2020–2021), Takamichi Crystalia / Kiramei Silver
- The Mockumentaries: Camera ga Toraeta Kaku Sekai (2021), Akira Saimyoji (Episode 8)
- JK kara Yarinaosu Silver Plan (2021), Nishida (Episode 4)
- Zettai BL ni Naru Sekai vs Zettai BL ni Naritakunai Otoko Season 2 (2022), Aoyagi (Episode 1)
- Izu Hakone no 13-nin (2022), Shuzenji
- Sawako: Sore wa, Hatenaki Fukushū (2022), Shinji Ōtsu
- Kimi to Yukite Saku: Shinsengumi Seishunroku (2024), Hajime Saitō
- Ai no Kakezan (2024), Takao – Main role
- Kasōken no Onna Season 24 (2024), Takumi Hasebe (Episode 8)
- Kamen Rider Gavv (2024–2025), Rakia Amarga / Granute Lage Nine / Kamen Rider Vram
- 10 Things I Want to Do Before I Turn 40 (2025), Keishi Tanaka

=== Films ===
- Mashin Sentai Kiramager the Movie: Be-Bop Dream (2021), Crystalia Takamichi
- Osomatsu-san (2022), Host (Cameo)
- Kamen Rider Gavv: Invaders of the House of Snacks (2025), Rakia Amarga / Kamen Rider Vram
- 10 Things I Want to Do Before I Turn 40: The Movie (2027), Keishi Tanaka

=== Original Videos ===
- Mashin Sentai Kiramager vs. Ryusoulger (2021), Takamichi Crystalia
- Ten Gokaiger (2022), Takamichi Crystalia
- Kikai Sentai Zenkaiger vs. Kiramager vs. Senpaiger (2022), Takamichi Crystalia
- Kamen Rider Gavv: Guilty Parfait (2026), Rakia Amarga / Kamen Rider Vram

=== Stage ===
- Enka Musical: Ashita ni Utaeba – Kiyoki Ikkyoku Onegai Shimasu (2022), Iga
- Rōdokugeki: Gokuraku Rōyashiki (Yotsuya Kaidan by Hanta Kinoshita) (2023)
- Kamen Rider Gavv Final Stage (2025), Rakia Amarga / Kamen Rider Vram – National Tour

== Publications ==
Photo Books

- 知らず知らずのうちにここにいて、 (*Shirazushirazu no Uchi ni Koko ni Ite*, 2021), Tokyo News Tsushinsha. ISBN 978-4-86701-247-5.
- だから、ぼくは (*Dakara, Boku wa*, 2025), KADOKAWA. ISBN 978-4-04902-615-3.

Web Fiction

- なつのさくら (*Natsu no Sakura*, 2025), HB
