= List of Kamen Rider ZEZTZ episodes =

This is a list of episodes for Kamen Rider ZEZTZ, a Japanese tokusatsu television drama. It is the seventh series in the franchise released in Japan's Reiwa Era and the 36th entry of Toei's long-running Kamen Rider series produced by TV Asahi.

== Episodes ==
No.	Title	Directed by	Written by	Original release date
1	"Start"; Transliteration: "Hajimaru" (Japanese: 始まる)	Kazuya Kamihoriuchi	Yuya Takahashi	September 7, 2025
In his dreams, Baku Yorozu is a secret agent for the organization CODE, as Code Number: 7, using his skills and wits to save the great pop-idol Nem from terrorists who take her hostage. In the real world, Baku is a recent college graduate struggling to find a job, while a combination of bad luck and constant need to be a hero thwart his attempts. One such attempt at finding a missing girl lands him in the hospital after he is hit by a car with no driver. While lying unconscious, Baku is chased by the Gun Nightmare, and returns to his previous dream of saving Nem, but with the terrorists replaced by this new creature. After Baku realizes he is in his dreamworld, he is pulled into a separate room by a robotic figure calling itself Code Number: 0, who gifts him the Zeztz Driver, allowing Baku to fight back and eventually destroy the Nightmare.
2	"Explode"; Transliteration: "Hazeru" (Japanese: 爆ぜる)	Kazuya Kamihoriuchi	Yuya Takahashi	September 14, 2025
As Tokyo MPD Police Inspector Nasuka Nagumo finds herself assigned to the maligned and marginalized "Mysterious Case Division" under veteran cop Tetsuya Fujimi, Baku recovers from his last incident, while Fujimi thinks Baku's dreams might be a link to inexplicable "Black Cases" happening in the real world. As Baku gains new capsules for Zeztz, he finds himself back in the dreamworld, trying to stop the Bomb Nightmare. But Baku soon finds out that this time it's not as simple as defeating the Nightmare, as this one is somehow linked to Fujimi's subconscious dream.
3	"Erode"; Transliteration: "Mushibamu" (Japanese: 蝕む)	Kazuya Kamihoriuchi	Yuya Takahashi	September 21, 2025
Baku is unable to stop the Bomb Nightmare from exploding part of the Omi Police Station, as he recognizes with horror that the Nightmare's actions resulted in the same police station being attacked in the real world with no apparent attacker. Meanwhile, Tsukasa Tōdō, the Director of the Public Security Bureau, tells Fujimi that his Mysterious Case Division is being shut down, believing it to be a waste of time and resources. A devastated Fujimi subconsciously wishes for the Tokyo MPD HQ to be destroyed. Baku enters Fujimi's dreamworld to stop him, but is unable to stop the Bomb Nightmare from absorbing Fujimi's body, and then blowing up the lobby of the building. Baku returns with a new capsule for Zeztz, using his new power to disarm the bomb and eliminate the Nightmare without harming Fujimi.
4	"Rob"; Transliteration: "Ubau" (Japanese: 奪う)	Hiroki Kashiwagi	Yuya Takahashi	September 28, 2025
Baku's latest case involves protecting a VIP bride, Miyuki Asamiya, from what appears to be a jealous ex-boyfriend named Ippei Doi. As the Crow Nightmare attacks the chapel, Zeztz uses the new Wing Capsem to challenge the Nightmare in an aerial dogfight, but soon discovers that Ippei might not be the Dreamer in this case. Meanwhile, Tōdō tasks Fujimi and Nasuka with investigating "Black Cases" in an unofficial capacity, as they follow the trail of crow feathers that mysteriously appeared in a chapel.
5	"Crash"; Transliteration: "Ochiru" (Japanese: 堕ちる)	Hiroki Kashiwagi	Yuya Takahashi	October 5, 2025
Baku wakes up to find that Fujimi and Nasuka have broken into his room and found the secret base Zeztz Room hidden in his closet, but Code Number: 0 allows them to stay and provide assistance. As they begin turning the base into the new home of the Mysterious Case Division, they help Baku reach the conclusion that Miyuki is the Dreamer, and from there, the true target of the Crow Nightmare. Later, the mysterious man behind the Nightmares appears to know something about Nem.
6	"Imprison"; Transliteration: "Fūjiru" (Japanese: 封じる)	Kyohei Yamaguchi	Yuya Takahashi	October 12, 2025
CODE's latest case has Baku going undercover in a dream prison to rescue Nem and her family from their incarceration. The case takes a sudden turn when Baku finds out that Nem was actually adopted, and her father is Masumi Bijogi, the president of the talent agency who began her rise to stardom. Zeztz easily destroys a chainsaw robot with his new Capsem powers, and comes face to face with the mysterious man seeding Nightmares throughout the world, only to discover that the Nightmare threatening Nem's family isn't the robot, but the prison itself.
7	"Punish"; Transliteration: "Bassuru" (Japanese: 罰する)	Kyohei Yamaguchi	Yuya Takahashi	October 19, 2025
Baku finds out a shocking secret about Nem while trying to find the cause behind Bijogi's Nightmare, that she was involved in a near-fatal bus crash while Bijogi survived. Bijogi left Nem in a private hospital to recover, but then she disappeared without a trace, and he felt guilt over the incident ever since. The Nem that Baku has been meeting repeatedly in the dream world can't find where her real body is, or if she's even still alive. Baku swears to find the real Nem, and then transforms into Zeztz, using his new Projection Capsem to dodge the Nightmare's defenses and strike at the "brain" of the prison itself. Afterwards, the mysterious man talks to a sleeping woman who appears to be Nem, telling her to keep giving everyone bad dreams.
8	"Serve"; Transliteration: "Motenasu" (Japanese: 饗す)	Kazuya Kamihoriuchi	Yuya Takahashi	October 26, 2025
Multiple cooks at the restaurant Royale Shirogane have been poisoned by an unknown substance. Fujimi suspects another Black Case behind it and tries to stop a planned conference between Japan's Foreign Affairs Minister and the President of Eldovia, but cannot convince the former to change plans. Baku gets coupons from Code 0 to visit the real world restaurant with his sister, and discovers that the poison is in the green "Royale Sauce" before she tastes it. Baku returns to the dreamworld and confronts the Poison Nightmare, but gets poisoned himself along with Chef-Owner Sannoh while protecting Nem. Nem gives Zeztz a new Recovery Capsem to cure himself and Sannoh, but the Poison Nightmare continues attacking and seemingly kills both Zeztz and Sannoh.
9	"Poison"; Transliteration: "Okasu" (Japanese: 侵す)	Kazuya Kamihoriuchi	Yuya Takahashi	November 9, 2025
In desperation, Nem shoves the Recovery Capsem into the Breakem Breaker and shoots Zeztz with it, saving Baku from death. The following day, Baku escapes his hospital bed to find that Sannoh was not poisoned, but did have surgery scheduled the day of the conference. The Poison Nightmare was a twisted form of his tough love for his apprentices to carry on his work. With Fujimi unable to stop the sous chefs from cooking at the conference, Baku again enters Sannoh's dreamworld, and defeats the Nightmare with the Recovery Capsem before the Eldovian President and the Japanese Foreign Minister die from the sauce. However, the mysterious man reappears and directly attacks Zeztz, stealing his Recovery Capsem to restore something in the real world. Meanwhile, Nasuka tells Fujimi that she was looking into the case of his vanished partner, Kensei Odaka.
10	"Vanish"; Transliteration: "Kieru" (Japanese: 消える)	Takayuki Shibasaki	Yuya Takahashi	November 16, 2025
Multiple paintings with an anemone flower in them are linked to a "national secret." In the real world, the paintings appear to be floating away on their own, and the Dreamer, Taro Atsumi, seems adamant on collecting them. Fujimi and Nasuka find out the one who donated these paintings is Kensei Odaka, Fujimi's former partner, and Baku recognizes as the mysterious man who's been using the Nightmares against him. Baku goes back into Atsumi's dreamworld as Zeztz and uses his new Barrier Capsem to defend Nem and the paintings from the Mold Nightmare. Upon calling out Odaka's name, the mysterious man says "that man no longer exists," and calls himself Nox instead.
11	"Rot"; Transliteration: "Kusaru" (Japanese: 腐る)	Takayuki Shibasaki	Yuya Takahashi	November 23, 2025
Baku is unable to continue as Fujimi wakes up Atsumi in the real world to interrogate him, but with little success. Nasuka calls in Baku, who introduces himself to Atsumi as the housekeeper from his dream. Atsumi breaks down and tells the group that he was a starving artist who turned to counterfeiting when he was paid to copy three paintings by Odaka, but he won't say what the secret is. After hours of interrogation, Atsumi falls asleep, but the Mold Nightmare is beginning to rot him in the real world too. Baku rushes back into the dreamworld to save him, even as Code 0 insists he focus on Nox and the stolen paintings. Baku transforms into Zeztz and uses the Wonder Capsem to defeat the Nightmare and save Atsumi. However, Nox has taken a suitcase and used the stolen Recovery Capsem to turn its contents into another Zeztz Driver and Capsem.
12	"Impact"; Transliteration: "Tsuku" (Japanese: 衝く)	Kyohei Yamaguchi	Yuya Takahashi	November 30, 2025
Baku's latest assignment is to infiltrate the dreams of a space-loving boy named Seiya to stop a meteor from destroying Earth in two days, as one meteorite in the dream leaves a giant crater in the real world with no apparent cause. However, Baku is stymied in this task by Nox, and his own subconscious feelings preventing him from getting new Capsems. During his second attempt, Nox reveals the Driver and Capsem he got from earlier, and transforms into the Nox Knight with the Erase Capsem. While fighting with Zeztz, Nox shoots the Barrier Capsem out of his hand, unleashing a Nightmare-like ghost that fights them both, until Nox destroys it, saying that the Nightmares are the true source of the Capsems' power. Meanwhile, Baku's sister Minami discovers CODE's secret base in his closet, and Fujimi blames himself for letting Odaka disappear and turn into Nox.
13	"Extinguish"; Transliteration: "Horobosu" (Japanese: 滅ぼす)	Kyohei Yamaguchi	Yuya Takahashi	December 7, 2025
Nox uses his Erase Capsem to rip out all of Zeztz's Capsems, leaving Baku powerless to stop a second meteorite shower from destroying the space center in both the dream and real worlds. Baku's despair causes both Fujimi and Code 0 to give up on him. However, Seiya calls to thank Baku in person for encouraging his dream of visiting space, and shows off his family's closed restaurant. Baku then realizes the Nightmare twisted his love for his parents to give up on his space-faring dreams, and that Seiya's Nightmare is actually the meteor itself. With under 24 hours to stop the Meteor Nightmare from destroying humanity, Baku returns to CODE's HQ in the dream world and draws the Gravity Capsem. Fighting through Nox, Baku uses his new Gravity powers to create a black hole that stops the meteor, but it sucks Zeztz in too. Back on the ground, Code 0 reveals that Nox was formerly Code Number: 4. When Minami fails to wake up Baku in the real world, she begs Code 0 for help.
14	"Thunder"; Transliteration: "Kaminaru" (Japanese: 神鳴る)	Kazuya Kamihoriuchi	Yuya Takahashi	December 14, 2025
Baku regains consciousness in the dream world as Code 7 when Code 0 gives him a new mission: Eliminate Nox. Code 7 asks for more info about Nox but Code 0 rebuffs him and tells him to carry out the mission. Code 7, with Nem, peers into his own nightmare as a boy walking to school. In the school, Baku was in a "special class" where he doesn't quite remember the lessons, but he soon finds that a younger Odaka was his teacher. Despite Nox's ominous warning about the Capsems, Baku uses his own nightmare to create the Plasma Capsem, and returns to the scene of the previous dream. In the real world, Baku still sleeps, Fujimi and Nasuka are unable to turn up any more leads about Odaka and see the sky abruptly shift from day to night, and Minami gets mad at Code 0's new mission for Baku. Meanwhile, Nox is battling his own nightmare, who taunts him that his fear is keeping him from returning to the real world, as the real Odaka is lying comatose in a hospital bed somewhere. Baku transforms back into Zeztz, and using the Plasma Capsem, is able to defeat the Nox Knight, but his own power overloads and disappeears afterward. Baku demands Nox tell him what he erased from Baku's own memories, and Nox says "CODE" before disappearing.
15	"Lighten"; Transliteration: "Terasu" (Japanese: 照らす)	Kazuya Kamihoriuchi	Yuya Takahashi	December 21, 2025
16	"Escape"; Transliteration: "Hashiru" (Japanese: 奔る)	Koichiro Hayama	Yuya Takahashi	January 4, 2026
17	"Pursue"; Transliteration: "Ou" (Japanese: 逐う)	Koichiro Hayama	Yuya Takahashi	January 11, 2026
18	"Shoot"; Transliteration: "Utsu" (Japanese: 撃つ)	Hiroki Kashiwagi	Yuya Takahashi	January 18, 2026
19	"Decide"; Transliteration: "Erabu" (Japanese: 択ぶ)	Hiroki Kashiwagi	Yuya Takahashi	January 25, 2026
20	"Presage"; Transliteration: "Kizasu" (Japanese: 兆す)	Kyohei Yamaguchi	Yuya Takahashi	February 1, 2026
21	"Burst"; Transliteration: "Afureru" (Japanese: 溢れる)	Kyohei Yamaguchi	Yuya Takahashi	February 8, 2026
22	"Revenge"; Transliteration: "Mukuiru" (Japanese: 讐いる)	Takayuki Shibasaki	Yuya Takahashi	February 15, 2026
23	"Destroy"; Transliteration: "Kowasu" (Japanese: 壊す)	Takayuki Shibasaki	Yuya Takahashi	February 22, 2026
24	"Break"; Transliteration: "Kowareru" (Japanese: 壊れる)	Kazuya Kamihoriuchi	Yuya Takahashi	March 1, 2026
25	"Get Started"; Transliteration: "Hajimeru" (Japanese: 始める)	Kazuya Kamihoriuchi	Yuya Takahashi	March 8, 2026
26	"Gather"; Transliteration: "Sorou" (Japanese: 揃う)	Koichiro Hayama	Yuya Takahashi	March 15, 2026
27	"Play"; Transliteration: "Zareru" (Japanese: 戯れる)	Teruaki Sugihara	Yuya Takahashi	March 22, 2026
28	"Rage"; Transliteration: "Areru" (Japanese: 荒れる)	Teruaki Sugihara	Yuya Takahashi	March 29, 2026
29	"Trick"; Transliteration: "Azamuku" (Japanese: 欺く)	Takayuki Shibasaki	Yuya Takahashi	April 5, 2026
30	"Order"; Transliteration: "Shosuru" (Japanese: 処する)	Takayuki Shibasaki	Yuya Takahashi	April 12, 2026
31	"Afflict"; Transliteration: "Sainamu" (Japanese: 苛む)	Kazuya Kamihoriuchi	Yuya Takahashi	April 19, 2026
32	"Overcome"; Transliteration: "Koeru" (Japanese: 超える)	Kazuya Kamihoriuchi	Yuya Takahashi	April 26, 2026
33	"Realize"; Transliteration: "Arawaru" (Japanese: 現る)	Teruaki Sugihara	Yuya Takahashi	May 3, 2026
34	"Infiltrate"; Transliteration: "Moguru" (Japanese: 潜る)	Teruaki Sugihara	Yuya Takahashi	May 10, 2026
35	"Connect"; Transliteration: "Tsunagaru" (Japanese: 繋がる)	Koichiro Hayama	Yuya Takahashi	May 17, 2026
36	"Unite"; Transliteration: "Suberu" (Japanese: 統べる)	Koichiro Hayama	Yuya Takahashi	May 24, 2026
37	"Manipulate"; Transliteration: "Aratameru" (Japanese: 竄める)	Takayuki Shibasaki	Yuya Takahashi	May 31, 2026
38	"Reform"; Transliteration: "Tameru" (Japanese: 矯める)	Takayuki Shibasaki	Yuya Takahashi	June 7, 2026
39	"Judge"; Transliteration: "Sabaku" (Japanese: 裁く)	Satoshi Morota	Yuya Takahashi	June 14, 2026
40	"Generate"; Transliteration: "Tsukuru" (Japanese: 創る)	Satoshi Morota	Yuya Takahashi	June 21, 2026
41	"Arise"; Transliteration: "Mezameru" (Japanese: 目覚める)	Kazuya Kamihoriuchi	Yuya Takahashi	June 28, 2026
42	"Devour"; Transliteration: "Kuu" (Japanese: 喰う)	Kazuya Kamihoriuchi	Yuya Takahashi	July 5, 2026
43	"Split"; Transliteration: "Wakareru" (Japanese: 訣れる)	Teruaki Sugihara	Yuya Takahashi	July 12, 2026
44	"Efface"; Transliteration: "Hōmuru" (Japanese: 葬る)	Teruaki Sugihara	Yuya Takahashi	July 19, 2026
45	"Hallucinate"; Transliteration: "Madowasu" (Japanese: 惑わす)	Jun Watanabe	Yuya Takahashi	July 26, 2026
46	"Resurrect"; Transliteration: "Yomigaeru" (Japanese: 甦る)	Jun Watanabe	Yuya Takahashi	August 2, 2026
47	"Save"; Transliteration: "Sukuu" (Japanese: 救う)	Takayuki Shibasaki	Yuya Takahashi	August 9, 2026
48	"Rest"; Transliteration: "Hakanakunaru" (Japanese: 儚くなる)	Takayuki Shibasaki	Yuya Takahashi	August 16, 2026
49	"Remember"; Transliteration: "Omou" (Japanese: 憶う)	Kazuya Kamihoriuchi	Yuya Takahashi	August 23, 2026
50 (Finale)	"Imagine"; Transliteration: "Omou" (Japanese: 想う)	Kazuya Kamihoriuchi	Yuya Takahashi	August 30, 2026
