= Kamen Rider Gavv =

Japanese television drama

- Genre: Tokusatsu; Superhero fiction Fantasy; Comedy; Horror
- Created by: Shotaro Ishinomori
- Written by: Junko Kōmura
- Directed by: Teruaki Sugihara
- Starring: Hidekazu Chinen; Yusuke Hino; Nozomi Miyabe; Kohei Shoji; Shintarō Asanuma; Machi Chitose; Ryo Takizawa; Honoka Kawasaki; Ruito Koga; Elena Kamata; Arisa Nakajima; Shuhei Handa; Toshimasa Komatsu; Takashi Tsukamoto
- Voices of: Yōhei Tadano; Hiroki Yasumoto
- Opening theme: "Got Boost?" by Fantastics from Exile Tribe
- Composer: Go Sakabe
- Country of origin: Japan
- Original language: Japanese
- No. of episodes: 50 (list of episodes)

Production
- Producers: Takehiro Ōkawa (TV Asahi); Keisuke Shibataka (TV Asahi); Naomi Takebe (Toei); Minami Takijima (Toei)
- Running time: 25 minutes
- Production companies: TV Asahi; Toei Company; ADK Emotions

Original release
- Network: ANN (TV Asahi)
- Release: September 1, 2024 – August 31, 2025

Related
- Kamen Rider Gotchard; Kamen Rider ZEZTZ

Kamen Rider Gavv (仮面ライダーガヴ, Kamen Raidā Gavu) is a Japanese drama, the 35th entry of Toei Company's Kamen Rider metaseries, and the sixth series to debut during the Reiwa period. The series debuted on September 1, 2024, joining Bakuage Sentai Boonboomger and later, No.1 Sentai Gozyuger in the Super Hero Time lineup after Kamen Rider Gotchard's finale. The series concluded on August 31, 2025 and was succeeded by Kamen Rider ZEZTZ. It also marks the debut of a snack motif including gummy candies, potato chips, marshmallows, chocolates, and lollipops.

== Plot ==
Shoma is a human-Granute hybrid and the youngest child of the Stomach Family, a powerful family in the Granute World that made a profit in the black market with their addictive Dark Treats and utilizing their addicted clientele to gather the secret ingredient of their product: humans. After their father Bouche died and his oldest brother Lango takes over the company, Shoma escapes to Earth after his mother was murdered by his half-siblings. There, Shoma learns of the modifications his father commissioned on his body allow him to produce Gochizo, using them to become Kamen Rider Gavv. Adopting his mother’s surname, Shoma’s struggle as Gavv to keep humans from being kidnapped and processed into Dark Treats puts him as odds with his half-siblings with his sister Siita the first to fall.

Shoma is aided by Sachika Amane, CEO of the jack-of-all-trades shop Hapipare, who takes him in, his granduncle Dente Stomach who have since defected his family before Shoma did, and Hanto Karakida, a freelance writer whose investigation of the Granutes led to him becoming Kamen Rider Valen via a modification surgery by researcher Kenzo Suga, an accomplice of Nyelv Stomach. The two riders are later joined by Rakia Amarga, a Granute who joined Stomach Inc. under false pretenses to be made into Kamen Rider Vram to destroy the company for causing the death of his younger brother. Suga eventually reveals his true colors when he creates clones of Shoma that transform into Kamen Rider Bitter Gavv, before he create his own Rider power to transform into Kamen Rider Bake. Though killed by Hanto, Suga entrusted Nyelv to continue their work.

One month later, through the actions of Siita’s twin brother Jiip, the Stomach siblings are powerless to a corporate take over by the Granute World’s ruling family, the Jaldaks, with Nyelv making batches of new Bitter Gavvs that include Jiip and the reanimated Suga. After avenging Dente's death by his sister Glotta, Shoma learns from Hanto that the candy shop owner he met, Masaru is a brother of his late mother. As Bocca Jaldak and the remaining Stomach siblings are killed, Shoma stopping Lango from a mass farming of humans, Hanto and Rakia devastate Stomach Inc. with the former saving the human while latter stays behind to destroy the interdimensional gates between Granute World and Earth with Lizel Jaldak and some part-time Stomach Inc. employees stranded on the human world.

Three months later, the Granute World is being rebuilt under a new administration, and Shoma is devising Light Treats for the still addicted part-timers.

== Production ==
The Kamen Rider Gavv trademark was registered by Toei Company on April 27, 2024, and published on May 10, 2024.

Gavv was officially announced on July 1, 2024.

The opening theme song "Got Boost?" is performed by dance and vocal group Fantastics from Exile Tribe.

== Episodes ==
No.	Title	Directed by	Written by	Original release date
1	"A Snack Kamen Rider!?"; Transliteration: "Okashi na Kamen Raidā!?" (Japanese: おカシな仮面ライダー!?)	Teruaki Sugihara	Junko Kōmura	September 1, 2024
2	"Happy Zakuzakuchips"; Transliteration: "Shiawase Zakuzakuchippusu" (Japanese: 幸せザクザクチップス)	Teruaki Sugihara	Junko Kōmura	September 8, 2024
3	"Soda Punch Is a Guilty Pleasure"; Transliteration: "Sōda Panchi wa Tsumi na Aji" (Japanese: ソーダパンチは罪な味)	Takayuki Shibasaki	Junko Kōmura	September 15, 2024
4	"More Marshmallows Please!"; Transliteration: "Mashumaro Okawari!" (Japanese: マシュマロおかわり！)	Takayuki Shibasaki	Junko Kōmura	September 22, 2024
5	"The Memories Are Painful"; Transliteration: "Omoide ga Hirihiri" (Japanese: 思い出がヒリヒリ)	Satoshi Morota	Junko Kōmura	September 29, 2024
6	"Transformation Is Bitter Chocolate"; Transliteration: "Henshin wa Bitā Choko" (Japanese: 変身はビターチョコ)	Satoshi Morota	Junko Kōmura	October 6, 2024
7	"What Flavor Lies Underneath the Mask?"; Transliteration: "Kamen no Shita wa Don'na Aji" (Japanese: 仮面の下はどんな味)	Teruaki Sugihara	Junko Kōmura	October 13, 2024
8	"Dual Chocolate"; Transliteration: "Dyuaru Chokoreito" (Japanese: デュアル チョコレイト)	Teruaki Sugihara	Junko Kōmura	October 20, 2024
9	"Trick or Dance!"; Transliteration: "Torikku Oa Dansu!" (Japanese: トリック オア ダンス！)	Takayuki Shibasaki	Kaori Kaneko	October 27, 2024
10	"Extra Large! Candy Cannon!"; Transliteration: "Tokumori! Kyandi-hō!" (Japanese: 特盛り！キャンディ砲！)	Takayuki Shibasaki	Kaori Kaneko	November 10, 2024
11	"Beware of Sweet Words!"; Transliteration: "Amai Kotoba ni Goyōjin!" (Japanese: あまい言葉にご用心！)	Kazuya Kamihoriuchi	Junko Kōmura	November 17, 2024
12	"A Bond Connected by Doughnuts"; Transliteration: "Dōnatsu ga Tsunagu Kizuna" (Japanese: ドーナツがつなぐ絆)	Kazuya Kamihoriuchi	Junko Kōmura	November 24, 2024
13	"Promised Homemade Cake"; Transliteration: "Yakusoku no Tezukuri Kēki" (Japanese: 約束の手作りケーキ)	Teruaki Sugihara	Junko Kōmura	December 1, 2024
14	"Miraculous Awakening! Caking"; Transliteration: "Kiseki no Kakusei! Kēkingu" (Japanese: 奇跡の覚醒！ケーキング)	Teruaki Sugihara	Junko Kōmura	December 8, 2024
15	"Escaped Granute!"; Transliteration: "Dassō Guranyūto!" (Japanese: 脱走グラニュート！)	Satoshi Morota	Nobuniro Mouri (Note: Plot supervision by Junko Kōmura.)	December 15, 2024
16	"The Gift of Noël"; Transliteration: "Noeru no Okurimono" (Japanese: ノエルのおくりもの)	Satoshi Morota	Nobuhiro Mouri	December 22, 2024
17	"Caramel Tentacles Taste Like Happiness"; Transliteration: "Karameru Shokushu wa Kōfuku Aji" (Japanese: カラメる触手は幸福味)	Takayuki Shibasaki	Kaori Kaneko; Junko Kōmura	January 5, 2025
18	"Extremely Strong! The Pudding Bodyguard"; Transliteration: "Gekitsuyo! Purin na Yōjinbō" (Japanese: 激強！プリンな用心棒)	Takayuki Shibasaki	Kaori Kaneko; Junko Kōmura	January 12, 2025
19	"The Secret Bittersweet Flavor of Pudding"; Transliteration: "Purin no Horoniga Kakushiaji" (Japanese: プリンのほろ苦隠し味)	Teruaki Sugihara	Junko Kōmura	January 19, 2025
20	"Break In! To the Dark Treats Factory!"; Transliteration: "Totsunyū! Yamigashi Kōjō e!" (Japanese: 突入！闇菓子工場へ！)	Teruaki Sugihara	Junko Kōmura	January 26, 2025
21	"Too Bitter Gavv"; Transliteration: "Bitā Sugiru Gavu" (Japanese: ビターすぎるガヴ)	Ryuta Tasaki	Junko Kōmura	February 2, 2025
22	"The Truth Is Sweet and Bitter"; Transliteration: "Shinjitsu wa Amaku Nigai" (Japanese: 真実は甘く苦い)	Ryuta Tasaki	Junko Kōmura	February 9, 2025
23	"Broken Sweets"; Transliteration: "Burōkun Suītsu" (Japanese: ブロークンスイーツ)	Satoshi Morota	Junko Kōmura	February 16, 2025
24	"A Spoonful of Revival Ice Cream"; Transliteration: "Fukkatsu no Aisu Hitosaji" (Japanese: 復活のアイスひとさじ)	Satoshi Morota	Junko Kōmura	February 23, 2025
25	"Virtual Happiness, the Taste of Nectar"; Transliteration: "Kyozō no Shiawase Mitsu no Aji" (Japanese: 虚像の幸せ 蜜の味)	Takayuki Shibasaki	Nobuhiro Mouri	March 2, 2025
26	"Angry Pudding"; Transliteration: "Ikari no Puttsun Purin" (Japanese: 怒りのぷっつんプリン)	Takayuki Shibasaki	Nobuhiro Mouri	March 9, 2025
27	"Sour and Sweet to the Point of Burning"; Transliteration: "Sui mo Amai mo Kogasu Hodo" (Japanese: 酸いも甘いも焦がす程)	Teruaki Sugihara	Junko Kōmura	March 23, 2025
28	"Chocolate Frappe of Bonds!"; Transliteration: "Kizuna no Choko Furappe!" (Japanese: 絆のチョコフラッペ！)	Teruaki Sugihara	Junko Kōmura	March 30, 2025
29	"Jiip's Surprise Wedding!"; Transliteration: "Jīpu no Dengeki Kekkon!" (Japanese: ジープの電撃結婚！)	Satoshi Morota	Junko Kōmura	April 6, 2025
30	"The Most Terrible Presidential Daughter"; Transliteration: "Saikyō no Daitōryō Reijō" (Japanese: 最凶の大統領令嬢)	Satoshi Morota	Junko Kōmura	April 13, 2025
31	"A Marriage of Spicy and Bitter"; Transliteration: "Kara Niga Mariāju" (Japanese: 辛苦マリアージュ)	Kazuya Kamihoriuchi	Hiroki Uchida	April 20, 2025
32	"Cup on the True Feelings!"; Transliteration: "Hon'ne o Kappu On!" (Japanese: 本音をカップオン！)	Kazuya Kamihoriuchi	Hiroki Uchida	April 27, 2025
33	"One-Hit Kill!! Over Gavv!"; Transliteration: "Ichigekihissatsu!! Ōbā Gavu!" (Japanese: 一撃必殺！！オーバーガヴ！)	Takayuki Shibasaki	Junko Kōmura	May 4, 2025
34	"The Great 100 Gochizo Operation!"; Transliteration: "Hyappiki Gochizō Dai Sakusen!" (Japanese: 100匹ゴチゾウ大作戦！)	Takayuki Shibasaki	Junko Kōmura	May 11, 2025
35	"Zero Sweetness! Ironclad Lango"; Transliteration: "Amasa Zero! Teppeki no Rango" (Japanese: 甘さゼロ！鉄壁のランゴ)	Teruaki Sugihara	Junko Kōmura	May 18, 2025
36	"Turnaround! Awakening! Master Gavv"; Transliteration: "Gyakuten! Kakusei! Masutā Gavu" (Japanese: 逆転！覚醒！マスターガヴ)	Teruaki Sugihara	Junko Kōmura	May 25, 2025
37	"I Have Never Forgotten"; Transliteration: "Wasureta Koto wa Nai" (Japanese: 忘れたことはない)	Satoshi Morota	Nobuhiro Mouri	June 1, 2025
38	"The Other Side of Hatred"; Transliteration: "Nikushimi no Mukōgawa" (Japanese: 憎しみの向こう側)	Satoshi Morota	Nobuhiro Mouri	June 8, 2025
39	"Even Though I Was Looking for You"; Transliteration: "Sagashimotometeita no ni" (Japanese: 探し求めていたのに)	Shojiro Nakazawa	Junko Kōmura	June 15, 2025
40	"The Reminiscent À la Mode"; Transliteration: "Tsuioku no A Ra Mōdo" (Japanese: 追憶のアラモード)	Shojiro Nakazawa	Junko Kōmura	June 22, 2025
41	"Glasses Creeping Closer"; Transliteration: "Nijiriyoru Megane" (にじり寄る眼鏡)	Takayuki Shibasaki	Junko Kōmura	June 29, 2025
42	"At the End of Broken Feelings"; Transliteration: "Wareta Omoi no Hate ni" (Japanese: 割れた思いの果てに)	Takayuki Shibasaki	Junko Kōmura	July 6, 2025
43	"What Does the Human World Taste Like?"; Transliteration: "Ningen-kai wa Don'na Aji" (Japanese: 人間界はどんな味？)	Satoshi Morota	Nobuhiro Mouri	July 13, 2025
44	"A Dazzling Moment That Will Never Come Back"; Transliteration: "Mabushikute Modoranai Shunkan" (Japanese: まぶしくて戻らない瞬間)	Teruaki Sugihara	Saburo Yatsude	July 20, 2025
45	"I Won't Let Anyone Take Them Away Anymore"; Transliteration: "Mō Dare ni mo Ubawasenai" (Japanese: もう誰にも奪わせない)	Teruaki Sugihara	Junko Kōmura	July 27, 2025
46	"Shoma's Determination"; Transliteration: "Ketsui no Shōma" (Japanese: 決意のショウマ)	Teruaki Sugihara	Junko Kōmura	August 3, 2025
47	"Happy Dystopia"; Transliteration: "Shiawase no Disutopia" (Japanese: 幸せのディストピア)	Shojiro Nakazawa	Junko Kōmura	August 10, 2025
48	"Burning Amazingummy"; Transliteration: "Moero Ameijingumi" (Japanese: 燃えろアメイジングミ)	Shojiro Nakazawa	Junko Kōmura	August 17, 2025
49	"I Believe in Snacks"; Transliteration: "Ore wa Okashi o Shinjiteru" (Japanese: 俺はお菓子を信じてる)	Satoshi Morota	Junko Kōmura	August 24, 2025
50 (Finale)	"Aim for It! A Delicious Future!"; Transliteration: "Mezase! Oishii Mirai!" (Japanese: 目指せ！おいしい未来！)	Satoshi Morota	Junko Kōmura	August 31, 2025

== Films ==
Kamen Rider Gavv made his first appearance as a cameo in the film Kamen Rider Gotchard: The Future Daybreak.

=== Invaders of the House of Snacks ===
Kamen Rider Gavv: Invaders of the House of Snacks (仮面ライダーガヴ お菓子の家の侵略者, Kamen Raidā Gavu Okashi no Ie no Shinryakusha) is a film released on July 25, 2025, double-billed with No.1 Sentai Gozyuger: Tega Sword of Resurrection. Additionally, the main character of Kamen Rider ZEZTZ made his first appearance, portrayed by Ryutaro Imai as Baku Yorozu. The film was written by Junko Kōmura and directed by Teruaki Sugihara. The theme song is "Candy Blaze" performed by Fantastics from Exile Tribe. Alongside the film, a short titled Gochizo's Summer Vacation (ゴチゾウのなつやすみ, Gochizō no Natsu Yasumi) was shown. Although the events of the film appear to take place after episode 44 of the series, they are not set to take place between certain episodes and are loosely connected to the series.

== Spin-offs ==
- Glotta's Valentine: A web-exclusive short audio drama series of Toei Tokusatsu Fan Club.
  - Glotta's Valentine (グロッタのバレンタイン, Gurotta no Barentain): The titular first entry of the series released on February 16, 2025.
  - Glotta's Valentine 2: White Day Return Gift Strategy (グロッタのバレンタイン2 ホワイトデーお返し大作戦, Gurotta no Barentain Tsū Howaito Dē Okaeshi Dai Sakusen): A sequel to the titular first entry of the series released on March 9, 2025.
- Gavv Anime! Sweety Days: Strange Everyday Life (ガヴっとアニメ！ Sweety Days ～おかしな日常～, Gavutto Anime! Suwīti Deizu Okashi na Nichijō): A web-exclusive animated short series released on Toei Tokusatsu Fan Club on March 2, 2025.
- Kamen Rider Gavv: Graduations: Strange School Days (仮面ライダーガヴ GRADUATIONS おかしなスクールデイズ, Kamen Raidā Gavu Gurajuēshonzu Okashi na Sukūru Deizu): A web-exclusive short series released on Toei Tokusatsu Fan Club and Toei Tokusatsu YouTube Official (only the first episode) on March 16, 2025.
- Kamen Rider Gavv: Gourmet Snacks and Woo!-mai Wakamen!! (仮面ライダーガヴ お菓子なグルメで Woo(ウー)! マイ ワカメーン!!, Kamen Raidā Gavu Okashi na Gurume de Ū! Mai Wakamēn!!): Televi-Kun's "Hyper Battle DVD" (超(ハイパー)バトルDVD, Haipā Batoru Dī Bui Dī).
- Sweet Nightmare Game: Strange Game Tournament (SWEET NIGHTMARE GAME ～おかしなゲーム大会～, Suwīto Naitomea Gēmu ~Okashi na Gēmu Taikai~): A special included as part of the Blu-ray releases of Kamen Rider Gavv.<
- Gochizo Party (ゴチゾウパーティー, Gochizō Pātī): A web-exclusive short series released on Bandai's YouTube channel on August 31, 2025.
- Suga Kenzo Audio Drama CD: If Coffee Is a Poison. It Is a Slow Poison. (酸賀研造オーディオドラマCD ～If coffee is a poison. It is a slow poison.～, Suga Kenzō Ōdio Dorama Shī Dī ~Ifu Kōhī Izu A Poizun. Itto Izu A Surō Poizun.~): A CD audio drama.
- Kamen Rider Vram: Route Stomach (仮面ライダーヴラム ルートストマック, Kamen Raidā Vuramu Rūto Sutomakku): A web-exclusive special released on Toei Tokusatsu Fan Club on December 21, 2025. The events of the special take place in a "what-if" alternate timeline separate from the events of the series. The theme song is "A ray of light" by Rakia Amarga (Kohei Shoji).

== V-Cinema ==
Kamen Rider Gavv: Guilty Parfait (仮面ライダーガヴ ギルティ・パルフェ, Kamen Raidā Gavu Giruti Parufe) is a V-Cinema release which received a limited theatrical release on November 28, 2025, followed by its DVD and Blu-ray release on June 10, 2026. The events of the V-Cinema take place after the end of the series. The V-Cinema was written by Junko Kōmura and directed by Takayuki Shibasaki. The theme song is "Super Delicious" performed by Gateau Trois (Hidekazu Chinen, Yusuke Hino, and Kohei Shoji). Alongside the V-Cinema, a short titled Gochizo Morning Assembly (ゴチゾウちょうれい, Gochizō Chōrei) was shown.

== Cast ==
- Shoma (ショウマ, Shōma), Dark Shoma (ダークショウマ, Dāku Shōma): Hidekazu Chinen (知念 英和, Chinen Hidekazu)
- Hanto Karakida (辛木田 絆斗, Karakida Hanto): Yusuke Hino (日野 友輔, Hino Yūsuke)
- Sachika Amane (甘根 幸果, Amane Sachika): Nozomi Miyabe (宮部 のぞみ, Miyabe Nozomi)
- Lango Stomach (ランゴ・ストマック, Rango Sutomakku): Takashi Tsukamoto (塚本 高史, Tsukamoto Takashi)
- Glotta Stomach (グロッタ・ストマック, Gurotta Sutomakku): Machi Chitose (千歳 まち, Chitose Machi)
- Nyelv Stomach (ニエルブ・ストマック, Nierubu Sutomakku): Ryo Takizawa (滝澤 諒, Takizawa Ryō)
- Siita Stomach (シータ・ストマック, Shīta Sutomakku): Honoka Kawasaki (川﨑 帆々花, Kawasaki Honoka)
- Jiip Stomach (ジープ・ストマック, Jīpu Sutomakku): (Note: Credited under the name Jiip Jaldak (ジープ・ジャルダック, Jīpu Jarudakku) starting from episode 30.) Ruito Koga (古賀 瑠, Koga Ruito)
- Michiru Inoue (井上 みちる, Inoue Michiru): Arisa Nakajima (中島 亜梨沙, Nakajima Arisa)
- Soji Shioya (塩谷 壮士, Shioya Sōji): Toshimasa Komatsu (小松 利昌, Komatsu Toshimasa)
- Kenzo Suga (酸賀 研造, Suga Kenzō): Shintarō Asanuma (浅沼 晋太郎, Asanuma Shintarō)
- Rakia Amarga (ラキア・アマルガ, Rakia Amaruga): Kohei Shoji (庄司 浩平, Shōji Kōhei)
- Lizel Jaldak (リゼル・ジャルダック, Rizeru Jarudakku): Elena Kamata (鎌田 英怜奈, Kamata Erena)
- Masaru Inoue (井上 優, Inoue Masaru): Shuhei Handa (半田 周平, Handa Shūhei)

=== Voice cast ===
- Agents (エージェント, Ējento), Gochizo (ゴチゾウ, Gochizō): Kōki Sakurai (櫻井 皓基, Sakurai Kōki), Ayu Shōji (東海林 亜祐, Shōji Ayu)
- Dente Stomach (デンテ・ストマック, Dente Sutomakku): Yōhei Tadano (多田野 曜平, Tadano Yōhei)
- Bocca Jaldak (ボッカ・ジャルダック, Bokka Jarudakku): Hiroki Yasumoto (安元 洋貴, Yasumoto Hiroki)

=== Guest cast ===
- Man (1): Jin Katagiri (片桐 仁, Katagiri Jin)
- Jogger (2): Yoshiyuki Tsubokura (坪倉 由幸, Tsubokura Yoshiyuki)
- Masako Takarayashiki (宝屋敷 雅子, Takarayashiki Masako; 7–8): Karin Yamaguchi (山口 果林, Yamaguchi Karin)
- Kani (可児; 13–16): Yosuke Kishi (岸 洋佑, Kishi Yōsuke)
- Movie actor (16–17): Atomu Mizuishi (水石 亜飛夢, Mizuishi Atomu)
- Spectator (29–30): Katsuhiro Higo (肥後 克広, Higo Katsuhiro)
- Antique Store Employee (31): Kenta Mishima (三嶋 健太, Mishima Kenta)
- U・M・A (35–36): Crab Kani Club (Crab 蟹 Club, Kurabu Kani Kurabu)
- Taorin (タオリン; 44): Sota Nakajima (中島 颯太, Nakajima Sōta)
- Caries (カリエス, Kariesu; 44): Sekai (世界)
- Qlarp (クラープ, Kurāpu; 44): Keito Kimura (木村 慧人, Kimura Keito)
- Baku Yorozu (万津 莫, Yorozu Baku; 50): Ryutaro Imai (今井 竜太郎, Imai Ryūtarō)

== Theme songs ==
Opening theme

- "Got Boost?"
  - Lyrics: Shoko Fujibayashi (藤林 聖子, Fujibayashi Shōko)
  - Composition: SKY BEATZ, FAST LANE
  - Artist: Fantastics from Exile Tribe
  Episodes 1, 28, and 50 do not feature the show's opening sequence, and it is instead used as an insert song in episodes 1, 28, and 50.

Insert themes

- "Aishite" (愛して)
  - Lyrics: Yosuke Kishi
  - Composition & Arrangement: Yosuke Kishi, Ryunosuke Yamagishi (山岸 竜之介, Yamagishi Ryūnosuke)
  - Artist: Kani (Yosuke Kishi)
  - Episodes: 13
- "Shake it off"
  - Lyrics: Shoko Fujibayashi
  - Composition & Arrangement: SKY BEATZ
  - Artist: Fantastics from Exile Tribe
  - Episodes: 40, 46
- "HAPPY NOTE"
  - Lyrics: Shoko Fujibayashi
  - Composition: Go Sakabe (坂部 剛, Sakabe Gō)
  - Arrangement: tatsuo
  - Artist: Shoma (Hidekazu Chinen)
  - Episodes: 44
