= Kamen Rider ZEZTZ =

- Genre: Tokusatsu; Superhero fiction Action; Supernatural; Spy-fi; Crime fiction Drama
- Created by: Shotaro Ishinomori
- Screenplay by: Yuya Takahashi
- Directed by: Kazuya Kamihoriuchi
- Starring: Ryutaro Imai; Maho Horiguchi; Kenta Mishima; Rina Onuki; Miki Yagi; Yuki Tamaki; Shin Koyanagi; Yuzuki Hirakawa; Jay Kabira; Kousei Amano; Yuki Furukawa; Rie Mimura
- Voices of: Saori Hayami; Hiroaki Hirata; Jun Fukuyama; Junko Takeuchi; Koichi Yamadera; Hiro Shimono
- Narrated by: Jay Kabira
- Music by: Hiroshi Takaki; Go Sakabe
- Opening theme: "VISIONS" by Naqt Vane "PLAY BACK" by Yuta
- Country of origin: Japan
- Original language: Japanese
- No. of episodes: 50 (list of episodes)

Production
- Producers: Takehiro Ōkawa (TV Asahi); Keisuke Shibataka (TV Asahi); Toshinari Yanaka (Toei); Yōsuke Minato (Toei); Sōta Takasaki (Toei)
- Running time: 25 minutes
- Production companies: TV Asahi; Toei Company; ADK Emotions

Original release
- Network: ANN (TV Asahi)
- Release: September 7, 2025 – August 30, 2026

Related
- Kamen Rider Gavv; Kamen Rider MY-TH

Kamen Rider ZEZTZ (仮面ライダーゼッツ, Kamen Raidā Zettsu) is a Japanese tokusatsu television series, the 36th entry of Toei Company's Kamen Rider metaseries, and the seventh series to debut during the Reiwa period. The series debuted on September 7, 2025, joining No.1 Sentai Gozyuger, followed by Super Space Sheriff Gavan Infinity and later, Kakusei Hunter Omegahorn in the Super Hero Time lineup after Kamen Rider Gavv's finale. The series concluded on August 30, 2026 and was succeeded by Kamen Rider MY-TH.

The overall themes of the series are dreams and spy technology. It is both the first Kamen Rider series to have a global simulcast alongside its domestic Japanese release and, to date, the final series to air alongside a Super Sentai series for the time being.

The second half of the series coincides with the 55th anniversary of the entire Kamen Rider franchise.

== Plot ==
Baku Yorozu is a young man plagued with terrible luck who dreams of becoming a secret agent. He spends his nights dreaming of serving the special organization CODE as Code Number: Seven. When a stroke of misfortune pulls Baku into an encounter with the monsters known as Nightmares, he is enlisted by the mysterious commander Zero to become an actual CODE agent. Now equipped with the Zeztz Driver, a transformation belt using specially powered capsules known as "Capsems", Baku transforms into Kamen Rider Zeztz to stop the Nightmares in both the dream world and the real world. As he goes on more and more missions, however, Baku is quick to discover that there is a great deal that he doesn't know, and he has to learn before things spiral out of control.

In his battles in the dream world and the real one, Baku finds he has several allies. In reality, he is assisted by Tetsuya Fujimi, a police detective of the Mysterious Case Division, and his initially unwilling assistant Nasuka Nagumo. In dreams, he is assisted by Nem, a highly beloved celebrity who has not been seen publicly for years; only appearing in people's dreams. As Baku and Nem's relationship evolves, they come to realize she was injured and rendered comatose in an accident, and Baku makes it his ultimate mission to find Nem in the real world and help her wake up.

Working against Baku is a mysterious man known as Nox, who, like Nem, only exists in dreams where he tries to create Nightmares and bring ruin to the world. Nox's identity is revealed to be Kensei Odaka, a police officer, Fujimi's former assistant in the Mysterious Case Division, and also formerly Code Number: Four until his disappearance a year before the show's start. Zero assists Baku in both realms, only appearing as a shadowy hologram or remotely controlling an android which transforms into a motorcycle: CODE Zeroider.

As Baku continues to fight Nightmares and discovers the hidden depths and motivations behind the enemies and his own allies, more CODE agents are activated and brought into the fray. During an attack on CODE Japan, Baku is betrayed by Code Number: Three for choosing to protect Nem and is killed, only to wake up in a hospital bed immediately following his accident in episode 1. Baku realises his experience was not merely an elaborate dream but a premonition of a dangerous future and, discovering he still possesses the Zeztz Driver and all his knowledge from his dream, brings his allies together to aid him in his mission.

Soon after, all sides are disturbed by the return of Sieg, a former Code Number: One who fused with a Nightmare and was imprisoned for 1000 years for mass murdering people in dreams. With the odds ever changing, Baku must uncover what truths have been kept from him and decide who he really wants to be to complete his mission, which gets more and more complicated as the group faces an entirely new threat - the Gore Nightmares.

== Production ==
The Kamen Rider ZEZTZ trademark was registered by Toei Company on March 11, 2025, and published on March 19, 2025.

ZEZTZ was officially announced on July 6, 2025. A production announcement conference introducing the main cast and characters and the artist for the show's theme song was held on August 7, 2025.

This is the first Kamen Rider series to be broadcast internationally via a simultaneous release with North America, the UK and Australia and New Zealand receiving the show via Shout! Studios on its platforms.

The opening theme song is titled "VISIONS", performed by NAQT VANE, Hiroyuki Sawano's vocal project. The second opening theme song is titled "PLAY BACK", performed by Yuta.

== Episodes ==
The story is split into two arcs:

- First arc (Episodes 1–24) - Baku discovers that he really is a secret agent and using his skill of lucid dreaming begins to fight in the real world and the dream world, helping defeat Nightmares and saving people. His enemy Nox manages to repair the Knight Invoker to become Nox Knight and battles Zeztz. As the story develops, Baku discovers that CODE had influenced his childhood, training him from a young age along with other children into becoming operatives capable of lucid dreaming. He also learns the truth about Nem's origins and why she appears only in dreams before The Lady leads an attack on CODE Japan, and Baku is forced to decide which side he is on.
- Second arc (Episodes 25–50) - Discovering that everything that happened until now was a dream, Baku rediscovers his command post in his closet and begins defeating Nightmares swiftly. He gathers his allies from reality and dreams and explains to both that he had a premonition of a future, and uses that knowledge to convince them to help him. A new enemy named Sieg appears and intends destruction by making Nightmares powerful beyond their own control, whilst Code Number: Three lays the groundwork to overthrow Zero and ensure the true goal of CODE comes about. Although Three has been eliminated, someone manages to steal the Code: Somnia Capsem and misuses it to commit "Black Cases" that cause dreamers with malice intents to progressively become Nightmares and have their existence be consumed a few seconds later. Additionally, a powerful Gore Nightmare Oblivion rises.

| No. | Title | Directed by | Written by | Original release date |
|---|---|---|---|---|
| 1 | "Start"; Transliteration: "Hajimaru" (Japanese: 始まる) | Kazuya Kamihoriuchi | Yuya Takahashi | September 7, 2025 |
| 2 | "Explode"; Transliteration: "Hazeru" (Japanese: 爆ぜる) | Kazuya Kamihoriuchi | Yuya Takahashi | September 14, 2025 |
| 3 | "Erode"; Transliteration: "Mushibamu" (Japanese: 蝕む) | Kazuya Kamihoriuchi | Yuya Takahashi | September 21, 2025 |
| 4 | "Rob"; Transliteration: "Ubau" (Japanese: 奪う) | Hiroki Kashiwagi | Yuya Takahashi | September 28, 2025 |
| 5 | "Crash"; Transliteration: "Ochiru" (Japanese: 堕ちる) | Hiroki Kashiwagi | Yuya Takahashi | October 5, 2025 |
| 6 | "Imprison"; Transliteration: "Fūjiru" (Japanese: 封じる) | Kyohei Yamaguchi | Yuya Takahashi | October 12, 2025 |
| 7 | "Punish"; Transliteration: "Bassuru" (Japanese: 罰する) | Kyohei Yamaguchi | Yuya Takahashi | October 19, 2025 |
| 8 | "Serve"; Transliteration: "Motenasu" (Japanese: 饗す) | Kazuya Kamihoriuchi | Yuya Takahashi | October 26, 2025 |
| 9 | "Poison"; Transliteration: "Okasu" (Japanese: 侵す) | Kazuya Kamihoriuchi | Yuya Takahashi | November 9, 2025 |
| 10 | "Vanish"; Transliteration: "Kieru" (Japanese: 消える) | Takayuki Shibasaki | Yuya Takahashi | November 16, 2025 |
| 11 | "Rot"; Transliteration: "Kusaru" (Japanese: 腐る) | Takayuki Shibasaki | Yuya Takahashi | November 23, 2025 |
| 12 | "Impact"; Transliteration: "Tsuku" (Japanese: 衝く) | Kyohei Yamaguchi | Yuya Takahashi | November 30, 2025 |
| 13 | "Extinguish"; Transliteration: "Horobosu" (Japanese: 滅ぼす) | Kyohei Yamaguchi | Yuya Takahashi | December 7, 2025 |
| 14 | "Thunder"; Transliteration: "Kaminaru" (Japanese: 神鳴る) | Kazuya Kamihoriuchi | Yuya Takahashi | December 14, 2025 |
| 15 | "Lighten"; Transliteration: "Terasu" (Japanese: 照らす) | Kazuya Kamihoriuchi | Yuya Takahashi | December 21, 2025 |
| 16 | "Escape"; Transliteration: "Hashiru" (Japanese: 奔る) | Koichiro Hayama | Yuya Takahashi | January 4, 2026 |
| 17 | "Pursue"; Transliteration: "Ou" (Japanese: 逐う) | Koichiro Hayama | Yuya Takahashi | January 11, 2026 |
| 18 | "Shoot"; Transliteration: "Utsu" (Japanese: 撃つ) | Hiroki Kashiwagi | Yuya Takahashi | January 18, 2026 |
| 19 | "Decide"; Transliteration: "Erabu" (Japanese: 択ぶ) | Hiroki Kashiwagi | Yuya Takahashi | January 25, 2026 |
| 20 | "Presage"; Transliteration: "Kizasu" (Japanese: 兆す) | Kyohei Yamaguchi | Yuya Takahashi | February 1, 2026 |
| 21 | "Burst"; Transliteration: "Afureru" (Japanese: 溢れる) | Kyohei Yamaguchi | Yuya Takahashi | February 8, 2026 |
| 22 | "Revenge"; Transliteration: "Mukuiru" (Japanese: 讐いる) | Takayuki Shibasaki | Yuya Takahashi | February 15, 2026 |
| 23 | "Destroy"; Transliteration: "Kowasu" (Japanese: 壊す) | Takayuki Shibasaki | Yuya Takahashi | February 22, 2026 |
| 24 | "Break"; Transliteration: "Kowareru" (Japanese: 壊れる) | Kazuya Kamihoriuchi | Yuya Takahashi | March 1, 2026 |
| 25 | "Get Started"; Transliteration: "Hajimeru" (Japanese: 始める) | Kazuya Kamihoriuchi | Yuya Takahashi | March 8, 2026 |
| 26 | "Gather"; Transliteration: "Sorou" (Japanese: 揃う) | Koichiro Hayama | Yuya Takahashi | March 15, 2026 |
| 27 | "Play"; Transliteration: "Zareru" (Japanese: 戯れる) | Teruaki Sugihara | Yuya Takahashi | March 22, 2026 |
| 28 | "Rage"; Transliteration: "Areru" (Japanese: 荒れる) | Teruaki Sugihara | Yuya Takahashi | March 29, 2026 |
| 29 | "Trick"; Transliteration: "Azamuku" (Japanese: 欺く) | Takayuki Shibasaki | Yuya Takahashi | April 5, 2026 |
| 30 | "Order"; Transliteration: "Shosuru" (Japanese: 処する) | Takayuki Shibasaki | Yuya Takahashi | April 12, 2026 |
| 31 | "Afflict"; Transliteration: "Sainamu" (Japanese: 苛む) | Kazuya Kamihoriuchi | Yuya Takahashi | April 19, 2026 |
| 32 | "Overcome"; Transliteration: "Koeru" (Japanese: 超える) | Kazuya Kamihoriuchi | Yuya Takahashi | April 26, 2026 |
| 33 | "Realize"; Transliteration: "Arawaru" (Japanese: 現る) | Teruaki Sugihara | Yuya Takahashi | May 3, 2026 |
| 34 | "Infiltrate"; Transliteration: "Moguru" (Japanese: 潜る) | Teruaki Sugihara | Yuya Takahashi | May 10, 2026 |
| 35 | "Connect"; Transliteration: "Tsunagaru" (Japanese: 繋がる) | Koichiro Hayama | Yuya Takahashi | May 17, 2026 |
| 36 | "Unite"; Transliteration: "Suberu" (Japanese: 統べる) | Koichiro Hayama | Yuya Takahashi | May 24, 2026 |
| 37 | "Manipulate"; Transliteration: "Aratameru" (Japanese: 竄める) | Takayuki Shibasaki | Yuya Takahashi | May 31, 2026 |
| 38 | "Reform"; Transliteration: "Tameru" (Japanese: 矯める) | Takayuki Shibasaki | Yuya Takahashi | June 7, 2026 |
| 39 | "Judge"; Transliteration: "Sabaku" (Japanese: 裁く) | Satoshi Morota | Yuya Takahashi | June 14, 2026 |
| 40 | "Generate"; Transliteration: "Tsukuru" (Japanese: 創る) | Satoshi Morota | Yuya Takahashi | June 21, 2026 |
| 41 | "Arise"; Transliteration: "Mezameru" (Japanese: 目覚める) | Kazuya Kamihoriuchi | Yuya Takahashi | June 28, 2026 |
| 42 | "Devour"; Transliteration: "Kuu" (Japanese: 喰う) | Kazuya Kamihoriuchi | Yuya Takahashi | July 5, 2026 |
| 43 | "Split"; Transliteration: "Wakareru" (Japanese: 訣れる) | Teruaki Sugihara | Yuya Takahashi | July 12, 2026 |
| 44 | "Efface"; Transliteration: "Hōmuru" (Japanese: 葬る) | Teruaki Sugihara | Yuya Takahashi | July 19, 2026 |
| 45 | "Hallucinate"; Transliteration: "Madowasu" (Japanese: 惑わす) | Jun Watanabe | Yuya Takahashi | July 26, 2026 |
| 46 | "Resurrect"; Transliteration: "Yomigaeru" (Japanese: 甦る) | Jun Watanabe | Yuya Takahashi | August 2, 2026 |
| 47 | "Save"; Transliteration: "Sukuu" (Japanese: 救う) | Takayuki Shibasaki | Yuya Takahashi | August 9, 2026 |
| 48 | "Rest"; Transliteration: "Hakanakunaru" (Japanese: 儚くなる) | Takayuki Shibasaki | Yuya Takahashi | August 16, 2026 |
| 49 | "Remember"; Transliteration: "Omou" (Japanese: 憶う) | Kazuya Kamihoriuchi | Yuya Takahashi | August 23, 2026 |
| 50 (Finale) | "Imagine"; Transliteration: "Omou" (Japanese: 想う) | Kazuya Kamihoriuchi | Yuya Takahashi | August 30, 2026 |

== Films ==
Kamen Rider Zeztz made his first appearance as a cameo in the film Kamen Rider Gavv: Invaders of the House of Snacks.

=== Farewell Mission ===
Kamen Rider ZEZTZ: Farewell Mission (仮面ライダーゼッツ さよならのミッション, Kamen Raidā Zettsu Sayonara no Misshon) is a film released on July 24, 2026, double-billed with Super Space Sheriff Gavan Infinity: The Day the Sun Cried. Additionally, the main characters of Kamen Rider MY-TH made their first appearance, portrayed by Ikuho Akiya as Sora Otosumi and Riko Horikawa as Yuna Mizuki. The film was written by Yuya Takahashi and directed by Kazuya Kamihoriuchi. The theme song is "Dreams Never Sleep" performed by Yuta. The events of the film take place before the post-credits scene of the final episode of the series.

== Spin-offs ==
- Kamen Rider ZEZTZ: Series of Sister's Substory: Agent Minami (仮面ライダーゼッツ SERIES OF SISTER'S SUBSTORY エージェント美浪, Kamen Raidā Zettsu Shirīzu Obu Shisutāzu Sabusutōrī Ējento Minami): A web-exclusive series released on Toei Tokusatsu Fan Club on September 7, 2025. As inferred by the title, this series focuses less on Baku/Zeztz and instead follows his younger sister, Minami, in her own adventures as a talent agent.
- ZEZTZ Anime: Dream Part-Timer Baku (ゼッツあにめ ドリームアルバイターばく, Zettsu Anime Dorīmu Arubaitā Baku): A web-exclusive animated short series released on Toei Tokusatsu Fan Club on December 28, 2025.
- Kamen Rider ZEZTZ: Send 'Em Flying! Giant Robot CODE Zeroider!! (仮面ライダーゼッツ かっとばせ！巨大ロボット コードゼロイダー！！, Kamen Raidā Zettsu Kattobase! Kyodai Robotto Kōdo Zeroidā!!): Televi-Kun's "Hyper Battle DVD" (超(ハイパー)バトルDVD, Haipā Batoru Dī Bui Dī).
- Kamen Rider ZEZTZ × MY-TH: A New Chapter Begins (「仮面ライダーマイス」スペシャルバトンタッチ, Kamen Raidā Maisu Supesharu Baton Tatchi): A web-exclusive special short released on YouTube on August 30, 2026.

== Cast ==
- Baku Yorozu (万津 莫, Yorozu Baku): Ryutaro Imai (今井 竜太郎, Imai Ryūtarō)
- Nem (ねむ, Nemu): Maho Horiguchi (堀口 真帆, Horiguchi Maho)
- Tetsuya Fujimi (富士見 鉄也, Fujimi Tetsuya): Kenta Mishima (三嶋 健太, Mishima Kenta)
- Nasuka Nagumo (南雲 なすか, Nagumo Nasuka): Rina Onuki (小貫 莉奈, Onuki Rina)
- Minami Yorozu (万津 美浪, Yorozu Minami): Miki Yagi (八木 美樹, Yagi Miki)
- Code Number: Three (コードナンバー：スリー, Kōdo Nanbā Surī): Yuki Tamaki (玉城 裕規, Tamaki Yūki)
- Code Number: Five (コードナンバー：ファイブ, Kōdo Nanbā Faibu): Shin Koyanagi (小柳 心, Koyanagi Shin)
- Kureha Miyamoto (宮本 紅覇, Miyamoto Kureha): Yuzuki Hirakawa (平川 結月, Hirakawa Yuzuki)
- Code Number: Zero (コードナンバー：ゼロ, Kōdo Nanbā Zero): Jay Kabira (川平 慈英, Kabira Jiei)
- Nox (ノクス, Nokusu), Kensei Odaka (小鷹 賢政, Odaka Kensei): Yuki Furukawa (古川 雄輝, Furukawa Yūki)
- The Lady (ザ・レディ, Za Redi): Rie Mimura (美村 里江, Mimura Rie)
- Sieg (ジーク, Jīku): Kousei Amano (天野 浩成, Amano Kōsei)

=== Voice cast ===
- Catastrophe Gore Nightmare (カタストロフゴアナイトメア, Katasutorofu Goa Naitomea): Hiroaki Hirata (平田 広明, Hirata Hiroaki)
- Phantom Gore Nightmare (ファントムゴアナイトメア, Fantomu Goa Naitomea): Saori Hayami (早見 沙織, Hayami Saori)
- Punish Gore Nightmare (パニッシュゴアナイトメア, Panisshu Goa Naitomea): Jun Fukuyama (福山 潤, Fukuyama Jun)
- Oblivion Gore Nightmare (オブリビオンゴアナイトメア, Oburibion Goa Naitomea): Junko Takeuchi (竹内 順子, Takeuchi Junko)
- Zeztz Driver (ゼッツドライバー, Zettsu Doraibā): Koichi Yamadera (山寺 宏一, Yamadera Kōichi)
- Nox Driver (ノクスドライバー, Nokusu Doraibā): Hiro Shimono (下野 紘, Shimono Hiro)

=== Guest cast ===
- Tsukasa Tōdō (東堂 司, Tōdō Tsukasa; 3–4, 8–9, 39): Ichirota Miyagawa (宮川 一朗太, Miyagawa Ichirōta)
- Miyuki Asamiya (麻宮 みゆき, Asamiya Miyuki; 4–5): Mari Iriki (入来 茉里, Iriki Mari)
- Danboru Senpai (ダンボール先輩, Danbōru Senpai; 6, 16–17): (Note: Voice only in episodes 16 and 17.) Manabu Takeuchi (竹内 まなぶ, Takeuchi Manabu)
- Haruka Suzuki (鈴木 遥, Suzuki Haruka; 6): Nao Yumiki (弓木 奈於, Yumiki Nao)
- Rentaro Sannoh (山王 廉太郎, San'nō Rentarō; 8–9): Ikuji Nakamura (中村 育二, Nakamura Ikuji)
- Ryoji Shiomi (塩見 亮二, Shiomi Ryōji; 8–9): Tomoya Maeno (前野 朋哉, Maeno Tomoya)
- Shusuke Satoh (佐藤 修介, Satō Shūsuke; 8–9): On Nakano (仲野 温, Nakano On)
- Taro Atsumi (渥美 太郎, Atsumi Tarō; 10–11): Yasufumi Hayashi (林 泰文, Hayashi Yasufumi)
- Ruriko Aoi (葵 るり子, Aoi Ruriko; 32): Yuchami (ゆうちゃみ, Yūchami)
- Karl (カール, Kāru; 34): Don Fale (ドン・ファレ, Don Fare)
- Kinnosuke Shiranami (白浪 金之助, Shiranami Kin'nosuke; 39–40): Taro Suwa (諏訪 太朗, Suwa Tarō)
- Eight (エイト, Eito; 50): Himeno Aoyama (青山 姫乃, Aoyama Himeno)
- Sora Otosumi (音澄 宙, Otosumi Sora; 50): Ikuho Akiya (秋谷 郁甫, Akiya Ikuho)

== Theme songs ==
Opening themes

- "VISIONS"
  - Lyrics: Benjamin + cAnON.
  - Composition & Arrangement: Hiroyuki Sawano
  - Artist: NAQT VANE
  - Episodes: 4–24
  Episodes 1–3 do not feature the show's opening sequence, and it is instead used as an ending song in episodes 1–3 and as an insert song in episodes 5, 7, 23, and 50.
- "PLAY BACK"
  - Lyrics: Shoko Fujibayashi (藤林 聖子, Fujibayashi Shōko)
  - Composition & Arrangement: Hi-yunk (Back-On)
  - Artist: Yuta
  - Episodes: 26–49
  Episodes 25 and 50 do not feature the show's second opening sequence, and it is instead used as an ending song in episodes 25 and 50 and as an insert song in episode 49.

Insert themes

- "MOVE! TAKE IT!"
  - Composition & Arrangement: Go Sakabe (坂部 剛, Sakabe Gō)
  - Lyrics & Artist: TEEDA (Back-On)
  - Episodes: 2–4, 6–8, 18, 22
- "NemNemNEMOTION" (ねむねむNEMOTION, Nemu Nemu Nemōshon)
  - Lyrics: Isa Takinoo (瀧尾 沙, Takinoo Isa)
  - Composition & Arrangement: Shuhei Naruse (鳴瀬 シュウヘイ, Naruse Shūhei)
  - Artist: Nem (Maho Horiguchi)
  - Episodes: 16
- "Kickstart"
  - Lyrics: Hi-yunk (Back-On), TEEDA
  - Composition & Arrangement: Hi-yunk (Back-On)
  - Artist: Back-On
  - Episodes: 34
- "NoxoN" (NoxoN -ノクスオン-, Nokusuon)
  - Lyrics: Isa Takinoo
  - Composition & Arrangement: tatsuo
  - Artist: Subaru (昴) (from Royz)
  - Episodes: 38
